= Michael Freiter =

English footballer

Personal information
- Date of birth: 15 January 1996 (age 30)
- Position: Midfielder

Team information
- Current team: Great Wakering Rovers (on loan from Canvey Island)

Youth career
- –2012: Gillingham

Senior career*
Years	Team	Apps	(Gls)
2012–2016	Gillingham	1	(0)
2014–2015	→ Staines Town (loan)	8	(1)
2016–2017	East Thurrock United	29	(2)
2017–2018	Cray Wanderers	33	(8)
2018	Lordswood	9	(1)
2018–2019	Herne Bay	5	(0)
2019	Faversham Town	19	(3)
2019–2020	Alfreton Town	5	(0)
2020–2021	Sittingbourne	0	(0)
2021	Hemel Hempstead Town	1	(0)
2021	Sheppey United	2	(0)
2024–	Canvey Island	0	(0)
2024–	→ Great Wakering Rovers (loan)	0	(0)
- * Club domestic league appearances and goals as of 18:18, 15 August 2024 (UTC)

Michael Freiter (born 15 January 1996) is an English footballer who plays as a midfielder for Great Wakering Rovers on loan from Canvey Island.

== Club career ==
He made his first and only appearance in the English Football League, coming off as a substitute for Gillingham during a 3–1 win against Notts County on 3 May 2015 during the 2014–15 season. He was released after the 2015–16 season.

In August 2024, following an almost three-year break from playing, Freiter joined Canvey Island, joining Great Wakering Rovers on loan to gain match fitness.

== Career statistics ==
As of match played 21 August 2021

Appearances and goals by club, season and competition
Club	Season	League			FA Cup		League Cup		Other		Total	
Club	Season	Division	Apps	Goals	Apps	Goals	Apps	Goals	Apps	Goals	Apps	Goals
Gillingham	2012–13	League Two	0	0	0	0	0	0	0	0	0	0
Gillingham	2013–14	League One	0	0	0	0	0	0	0	0	0	0
Gillingham	2014–15	League One	1	0	0	0	0	0	0	0	1	0
Gillingham	2015–16	League One	0	0	0	0	0	0	0	0	0	0
Gillingham	Total		1	0	0	0	0	0	0	0	1	0
Staines Town (loan)	2014–15	Conference South	8	1	—		—		—		8	1
East Thurrock United	2016–17	National League South	29	2	0	0	—		3 (Note: Appearances in the FA Trophy)	0	32	2
Cray Wanderers	2017–18	Isthmian League South Division	33	8	1	0	—		7 (Note: Six appearances and one goal in the FA Trophy, one appearance in the Isthmian League South Division play-offs)	1	41	9
Lordswood	2018–19	Southern Counties East League Premier Division	9	1	1	0	—		2 (Note: Appearances in the FA Vase)	2	12	3
Herne Bay	2018–19	Isthmian League South East Division	5	0	—		—		—		5	0
Faversham Town	2018–19	Isthmian League South East Division	8	2	—		—		—		8	2
Faversham Town	2019–20	Isthmian League South East Division	11	1	1	0	—		5 (Note: Four appearances and one goal in the Alan Turvey Trophy, one in the FA Trophy)	1	17	2
Faversham Town	Total		19	3	1	0	—		5	1	25	4
Alfreton Town	2019–20	National League North	5	0	—		—		—		5	0
Sittingbourne	2020–21	Isthmian League South East Division	0	0	1	0	—		0	0	1	0
Hemel Hempstead Town	2021–22	National League South	1	0	0	0	—		0	0	1	0
Career total			110	15	4	0	0	0	15	4	139	19
