= Aaron Morris (footballer) =

Welsh footballer (born 1989)

Personal information
- Full name: Aaron John Morris
- Date of birth: 30 December 1989 (age 36)
- Place of birth: Rumney, Cardiff, Wales
- Height: 6 ft 0 in (1.83 m)
- Positions: Defender; midfielder

Youth career
- –2008: Cardiff City

Senior career*
Years	Team	Apps	(Gls)
2008–2010	Cardiff City	1	(0)
2009–2010	→ Newport County (loan)	5	(0)
2010–2013	Aldershot Town	98	(2)
2014	AFC Wimbledon	17	(0)
2014–2018	Gillingham	58	(0)

International career
2009–2010	Wales U21	8	(0)
- * Club domestic league appearances and goals as of 20:23, 3 June 2017 (UTC)

Aaron John Morris (born 30 December 1989) is a Welsh professional footballer who last played as a midfielder for League One club Gillingham. He can also play as a defender and has represented the Wales national under-21 team.

== Club career ==
=== Cardiff City ===
Morris was born in Rumney, Cardiff.

Joining Cardiff City as a youth player, he made his first-team debut in a 1–0 victory over Welshpool Town on 23 January 2007 in the FAW Premier Cup and went on to play in the semi-final penalty shoot-out defeat to Newport County three weeks later. The FAW Premier Cup matches would be the only matches he played for the first team during the 2007–08 season.

The start of the 2008–09 season saw Morris handed a full first-team squad number for the first time. In August 2008 Morris was set to join Bournemouth on loan, along with fellow Cardiff player Jonathan Brown. The move fell through later after both clubs overlooked the fact that Morris was still only an academy scholar at Cardiff and was ineligible to be loaned out. On 26 August 2008, Morris came on as a substitute during Cardiff's 2–1 League Cup victory over Milton Keynes Dons after Darcy Blake suffered a hamstring injury.

In December 2009, Morris joined Conference South leaders Newport County initially on a one-month loan arrangement, making his debut in a 3–0 win over Dorchester Town on 28 December. His loan period at Newport concluded 29 February 2010. After returning to Cardiff, Morris made his league debut for the club in the final league game of the 2009–10 season as a substitute in place of Solomon Taiwo during a 2–0 defeat to Derby County. At the end of the 2009–10 season Morris was released by Cardiff, having played 4 games for the club.

=== Aldershot Town ===
Following his release, Morris spent time on trial with Brighton & Hove Albion and Exeter City before joining League Two side Aldershot Town on 30 July. In his first start, Morris was named sponsors Man of the Match following a 0–0 draw with Wycombe Wanderers on 18 September 2010. In his first season at Aldershot, Morris made 25 appearances in all competitions. The following season, he was a regular face in the first team squad, playing 45 games in all competitions and scoring his first career goal in a 1–0 victory at Macclesfield Town on 18 February 2012. He scored his second career goal less than a month later on 13 March 2012, scoring after 4 minutes to give Aldershot a 1–0 lead at Crawley Town in a game that ended 2–2. Morris's third season at Aldershot was also his final season with the club, he was everpresent in the side, making 44 appearances, before suffering cruciate ligament damage in the 18th minute of a 3–2 victory over Oxford United that ended his season. He was released at the end of the season as his contract with Aldershot expired and the club was relegated from The Football League.

=== AFC Wimbledon ===
Morris once again linked up with Neal Ardley, who brought him through the ranks at Cardiff City, by signing for AFC Wimbledon on 10 January 2014. On the transfer, Ardley stated "I would have signed Aaron in the summer if he was not injured, Aaron can play in a number of positions, but he can be a very good centre-back in my eyes". Morris later tweeted "Been a tough road back but delighted to be back on track and to have signed at AFC Wimbledon, good things to come I'm sure".

=== Gillingham ===
Following the 2013–14 season, he signed for Gillingham on a two-year deal. Morris was rewarded with another two-year contract at the conclusion of the 2015–16 season. He was released in summer 2018.

== International career ==
In June 2008, Morris was named as a stand-by player for the U19 squad for the Milk Cup tournament held in Northern Ireland. He received his first call-up to the Wales U21 side in February 2009, but the scheduled match against Northern Ireland U21s was called off due to adverse weather. Morris received his second call-up a month later for the qualifying matches against Luxembourg, being handed his first cap in the second meeting of the two sides when he played a full 90 minutes in a 5–1 win.

== Career statistics ==
As of match played 30 April 2017

Appearances and goals by club, season and competition
Club	Season	League			FA Cup		League Cup		Other		Total	
Club	Season	Division	Apps	Goals	Apps	Goals	Apps	Goals	Apps	Goals	Apps	Goals
Cardiff City	2008–09	Championship	0	0	0	0	1	0	—		1	0
Cardiff City	2009–10	Championship	1	0	0	0	0	0	—		1	0
Cardiff City	Total		1	0	0	0	1	0	—		2	0
Newport County (loan)	2009–10	Conference South	5	0	—		—		2 (Note: Appearance in FA Trophy)	0	7	0
Aldershot Town	2010–11	League Two	22	0	2	0	0	0	1 (Note: Appearance(s) in Football League Trophy)	0	25	0
Aldershot Town	2011–12	League Two	39	2	2	0	4	0	0	0	45	2
Aldershot Town	2012–13	League Two	37	0	4	0	1	0	2	0	44	0
Aldershot Town	Total		98	2	8	0	5	0	3	0	114	2
AFC Wimbledon	2013–14	League Two	17	0	—		—		—		17	0
Gillingham	2014–15	League One	23	0	0	0	2	1	0	0	25	1
Gillingham	2015–16	League One	35	0	1	0	0	0	1	0	37	0
Gillingham	2016–17	League One	0	0	0	0	0	0	0	0	0	0
Gillingham	Total		58	0	1	0	2	1	1	0	62	1
Career total			179	2	9	0	8	1	6	0	202	3
