= 2016–17 Gillingham F.C. season =

English football club season

Gillingham F.C.
2016–17 season
- Chairman: Paul Scally
- Head Coach: Justin Edinburgh (until 3 January); Adrian Pennock (from 4 January)
- Stadium: Priestfield Stadium
- League One: 20th
- FA Cup: First round
- League Cup: Third round
- EFL Trophy: Group stage
- Top goalscorer: League: Josh Wright (13); All: Josh Wright (14)
- Highest home attendance: 8,760 vs Fleetwood Town, League One, 22 April 2017
- Lowest home attendance: 2,128 vs Luton Town, EFL Trophy, 30 August 2016
- Average home league attendance: 6,129
Home colours	Away colours	Third colours

The 2016–17 season was Gillingham's 124th season in their existence and fourth consecutive season in League One. Along with League One, the club participated in the FA Cup, League Cup and Football League Trophy.

The season covers the period from 1 July 2016 to 30 June 2017.

== Transfers ==
=== Transfers in ===
Date from	Position	Nationality	Name	From	Fee	Ref.
1 July 2016	CM	(Republic of Ireland)	Mark Byrne	Newport County	Free transfer	
1 July 2016	LM	(England)	Billy Knott	Bradford City	Free transfer	
6 July 2016	CAM	(England)	Lee Martin	Millwall	Free transfer	
7 July 2016	RM	(England)	Scott Wagstaff	Bristol City	Free transfer	
21 July 2016	LB	(England)	Paul Konchesky	Leicester City	Free transfer	
12 August 2016	CM	(England)	Jamie O'Hara	Fulham	Free transfer	
3 October 2016	DM	(Australia)	Chris Herd	Perth Glory	Free transfer	
3 October 2016	CF	(England)	Frank Nouble	Free agent	Free transfer	
20 January 2017	GK	(Czech Republic)	Tomáš Holý	Sparta Prague	Free transfer	
28 January 2017	RW	(Antigua and Barbuda)	Josh Parker	Wealdstone	Free transfer	
2 February 2017	CB	(England)	Bondz N'Gala	Eastleigh	Free transfer	
21 February 2017	CM	(England)	Ollie Muldoon	Charlton Athletic	Free transfer	
23 February 2017	CB	(Pakistan)	Zesh Rehman	Pahang FA	Free transfer	

=== Transfers out ===
Date from	Position	Nationality	Name	To	Fee	Ref.
1 July 2016	LB	(England)	Ben Dickenson	Colchester United (Note: Following Dickenson's release, he signed for Colchester United.)	Released	
1 July 2016	CB	(Republic of Ireland)	John Egan	Brentford	Compensation	
1 July 2016	CM	(England)	Doug Loft	Colchester United (Note: Following Loft's release, he signed for Colchester United.)	Released	
1 July 2016	RM	(England)	Jermaine McGlashan	Southend United (Note: Following McGlashan's release, he signed for Southend United.)	Released	
1 July 2016	GK	(England)	Glenn Morris	Crawley Town (Note: Following Morris' release, he signed for Crawley Town.)	Released	
8 July 2016	DM	(England)	Josh Hare	Eastbourne Borough	Free transfer	
29 July 2016	MF	(England)	Michael Freiter	East Thurrock United	Free transfer	
6 August 2016	CF	(England)	Luke Norris	Swindon Town	Undisclosed	
18 January 2017	CF	(England)	Frank Nouble	Southend United	Free transfer	

=== Loans in ===
Date from	Position	Nationality	Name	From	Date until	Ref.
6 July 2016	CB	(England)	Deji Oshilaja	Cardiff City	End of Season	
7 July 2016	CF	(England)	Joe Quigley	AFC Bournemouth	31 January 2017	
5 August 2016	CF	(England)	Jay Emmanuel-Thomas	Queens Park Rangers	End of Season	
8 August 2016	CB	(England)	Josh Pask	West Ham United	End of Season	
26 August 2016	GK	(England)	Jonathan Bond	Reading	7 January 2017	
31 August 2016	CB	(England)	Baily Cargill	AFC Bournemouth	3 January 2017	
31 January 2017	RW	(England)	Harry Cornick	AFC Bournemouth	End of Season	
31 January 2017	CF	(England)	Joe Quigley	AFC Bournemouth	End of Season	

=== Loans out ===
Date from	Position	Nationality	Name	To	Date until	Ref.
29 July 2016	GK	(England)	Henry Newcombe	Chatham Town	1 January 2017	
31 August 2016	CF	(England)	Greg Cundle	Billericay Town	28 October 2016	
24 December 2016	CF	(England)	Greg Cundle	Bishop's Stortford	End of Season	
1 January 2017	GK	(England)	Henry Newcombe	VCD Athletic	End of Season	
12 January 2017	MF	(England)	Bradley Stevenson	Hastings United	9 February 2017	
16 January 2017	RW	(England)	Sam Lawford	Ramsgate	Work Experience	
2 February 2017	CM	(England)	Billy Knott	Lincoln City	End of Season	

== Competitions ==
=== Pre-season friendlies ===
15 July 2016	AS Étaples	0–2	Gillingham	Étaples, France
19:00		Report	Martin; Byrne

19 July 2016	Concord Rangers	1–2	Gillingham	Canvey Island
19:45	King 18'	Report	Norris 52'; Knott 90'	Stadium: Thames Road

20 July 2016	Billericay Town	1–1	Gillingham	Billericay
19:45 BST	Oyinsan 78'	Report	Dack 76'	Stadium: New Lodge

23 July 2016	Barnet	2-0	Gillingham	Edgware
15:00	Akinde 56'; Nicholls 67'	Report		Stadium: The Hive Stadium; Referee: Dean Whitestone

26 July 2016	Dartford	1-2	Gillingham	Dartford
19:45	Hayes 14'		Osadebe 51'; Quigley 67'	Stadium: Princes Park; Attendance: 801; Referee: Constantine Hatzakis

30 July 2016	Leyton Orient	2–0	Gillingham	Leyton
15:00	Massey 26'; Simpson 43' (pen.)	Report		Stadium: Brisbane Road; Attendance: 706 (147 away); Referee: Craig Hicks

=== League One ===
==== League table ====
Pos	Team	Pld	W	D	L	GF	GA	GD	Pts	Promotion, qualification or relegation
18	Shrewsbury Town	46	13	12	21	46	63	−17	51	
19	Bury	46	13	11	22	61	73	−12	50	
20	Gillingham	46	12	14	20	59	79	−20	50	
21	Port Vale (R)	46	12	13	21	45	70	−25	49	Relegation to EFL League Two
22	Swindon Town (R)	46	11	11	24	44	66	−22	44	Relegation to EFL League Two

Source: BBC Sport
Rules for classification: 1) Points; 2) Goal difference; 3) Number of goals scored
(R) Relegated

==== Matches ====
6 August 2016 1	Southend United	1–3	Gillingham	Southend-on-Sea
15:00 BST	McLaughlin 23'	Report	Emmanuel-Thomas 38'; Ehmer 47'; Wright (yellow card) 61'; Nelson (yellow card) 77'; Osadebe 79'	Stadium: Roots Hall; Attendance: 8,141 (1,769 away); Referee: Dean Whitestone

13 August 2016 2	Gillingham	2–1	Bury	Gillingham
15:00 BST	Jackson 6'; Kay 57' (o.g.); Hessenthaler (yellow card) 84'; Donnelly (yellow card) 90+3'	Report	Hope (yellow card) 32'; Pope 66'; Mayor (yellow card) 85'	Stadium: Priestfield; Attendance: 5,324 (189 away); Referee: Brendan Malone

16 August 2016 3	Gillingham	1–1	Swindon Town	Gillingham
19:45 BST	Ehmer (yellow card) 25'; Konchesky (yellow card) 54'; Wright (yellow card) 65'; Jackson (yellow card) 70'; Donnelly 71'	Report	Rodgers (yellow card) 31'; Doughty 55' (pen.); Barry (yellow card) 76'; Vigouroux (yellow card) 81'; Ormonde-Ottewill (yellow card) 90' (yellow-red card) 90+3'	Stadium: Priestfield Stadium; Attendance: 5,512 (190); Referee: Keith Stroud

20 August 2016 4	Scunthorpe United	5–0	Gillingham	Scunthorpe
15:00 BST	van Veen 5'; Morris 20' (pen.), 59'; Clarke 45+2'; Hopper 82'	Report	Emmanuel-Thomas (yellow card) 64'	Stadium: Glanford Park; Attendance: 3,718; Referee: David Webb

27 August 2016 5	Shrewsbury Town	2–3	Gillingham	Shrewsbury
15:00 BST	Dodds 17', 30'; Deegan (yellow card) 24'	Report	Emmanuel-Thomas 59', 73'; Ehmer (yellow card) 85' (goal) 90+3'	Stadium: New Meadow; Attendance: 4,611 (221 away); Referee: Darren Deadman

4 September 2016 6	Gillingham	1–2	Sheffield United	Gillingham
14:15 BST	Dack 34'; Oshilaja (yellow card) 46'; Pask (yellow card) 90'	Report	Done (yellow card) 14'; Lafferty (yellow card) 32'; Freeman 65'; Sharp 90+1' (pen.)	Stadium: Priestfield Stadium; Attendance: 5,598 (408); Referee: Darren Handley

10 September 2016 7	Gillingham	1–1	Bradford City	Gillingham
15:00 BST	McDonald 12'; Jackson (yellow card) 38'; Oshilaja (yellow card) 44'	Report	Hiwula 29'; Meredith (yellow card) 54'	Stadium: MEMS Priestfield Stadium; Attendance: 5,079 (377); Referee: Graham Scott

17 September 2016 8	Port Vale	2–1	Gillingham	Burslem
15:00 BST	Streete 76'; Jones 84'	Report	Osadebe (yellow card) 22'; Wright 25'; Oshilaja (yellow card) 36'; Wagstaff (yellow card) 58'; Ehmer (yellow card) 75'	Stadium: Vale Park; Attendance: 4,719 (Inc. 197 visiting supporters); Referee: Carl Boyeson

24 September 2016 9	Gillingham	2–1	Coventry City	Gillingham
15:00 BST	Ehmer 26'; Knott 72'	Report	Reid 21'; Dion Kelly-Evans (yellow card) 29'; Bigirimana (yellow card) 58'	Stadium: MEMS Priestfield Stadium; Attendance: 7,664 (380); Referee: Brett Huxtable

27 September 2016 10	Chesterfield	3–3	Gillingham	Chesterfield
19:45 BST	Wilkinson 2', 72' (yellow card) 43'; Dennis 52' (pen.) (yellow card) 90+3'; Anderson (yellow card) 64'	Report	Knott (yellow card) 49'; Emmanuel-Thomas 65' (pen.), 76' (pen.); Oldaker (yellow card) 90+5'; Wagstaff 90+6'	Stadium: Proact Stadium; Attendance: 4,714; Referee: Trevor Kettle

1 October 2016 11	AFC Wimbledon	2–0	Gillingham	Kingston upon Thames
15:00 BST	Poleon 20'; Parrett 45+1' (pen.) (yellow card) 61'	Report	Osadebe (yellow card) 27'; Konchesky (yellow card) 72'; Donnelly (red card) 89'	Stadium: Kingsmeadow Stadium; Attendance: 4,653; Referee: Darren England

8 October 2016 12	Gillingham	1–2	Oldham Athletic	Gillingham
15:00 BST	McDonald 10'; Wagstaff (yellow card) 19'; Dack (yellow card) 38'; Herd (yellow card) 62'; Nouble (yellow card) 68'; Nelson (yellow card) 90'	Report	Ladapo 65' (yellow card) 65'; Flynn 89'	Stadium: MEMS Priestfield Stadium; Attendance: 6,435; Referee: Kevin Johnson

15 October 2016 13	Bristol Rovers	2–1	Gillingham	Bristol
15:00 BST	Taylor (yellow card) 35'; Lines (yellow card) 42' (goal) 82'; Harrison 90'	Report	Hessenthaler (yellow card) 29'; Herd (yellow card) 31'; Dack (yellow card) 55'; Wright 62' (yellow card) 64'; Nouble (yellow card) 88'; Bond (yellow card) 89'; Konchesky (yellow card) 90+2'	Stadium: Memorial Stadium; Attendance: 9,489; Referee: John Brooks

18 October 2016 14	Gillingham	1–1	Walsall	Gillingham
19:45 BST	McDonald 25'; Wright (yellow card) 45'; Oshilaja (yellow card) 82'; Knott (yellow card) 89'	Report	Moussa 59'; O'Connor (yellow card) 80'	Stadium: MEMS Priestfield Stadium; Attendance: 5,542; Referee: Charles Breakspear

22 October 2016 15	Gillingham	1–1	Charlton Athletic	Gillingham
15:00 BST	Dack 41' (yellow card) 66'; Jackson (yellow card) 59'; Nouble (yellow card) 89'; Nelson (yellow card) 90'	Report	Magennis (yellow card) 16'; Holmes (penalty missed) 60'; Ajose 90+1' (pen.); Solly (yellow card) 90+5'; Konsa (yellow card) 90+7'	Stadium: MEMS Priestfield Stadium; Attendance: 8,670; Referee: Mark Heywood

29 October 2016 16	Fleetwood Town	2–1	Gillingham	Fleetwood
15:00 BST	Ball 19'; Bolger (yellow card) 77'; Hunter 82'	Report	Knott (yellow card) 41'; Herd (yellow card) 45+2'; Hessenthaler 52'	Stadium: Highbury Stadium; Attendance: 2,600; Referee: Richard Clark

12 November 2016 17	Gillingham	2–1	Northampton Town	Gillingham
15:00 GMT	Ehmer 48'; Emmanuel-Thomas 90+2'	Report	O'Toole 36'	Stadium: MEMS Priestfield Stadium; Attendance: 5,790; Referee: Lee Probert

19 November 2016 18	Walsall	1–2	Gillingham	Walsall
15:00 GMT	McCarthy 9'	Report	McDonald 2'; Ehmer (yellow card) 72'; Emmanuel-Thomas 84'	Stadium: The Banks's Stadium; Attendance: 5,420; Referee: John Busby

22 November 2016 19	Oxford United	1–0	Gillingham	Oxford
19:45 GMT	Johnson 32'; Hemmings (yellow card) 45+2'	Report	Dack (yellow card) 90+1'	Stadium: The Kassam Stadium; Attendance: 6,848; Referee: Andrew Madley

26 November 2016 20	Gillingham	3–0	Rochdale	Gillingham
15:00 GMT	Nouble 53' (yellow card) 70'; Emmanuel-Thomas 89'; Byrne 90+1' (yellow card) 90+5'	Report	Rafferty (yellow card) 59'	Stadium: MEMS Priestfield Stadium; Attendance: 5,409; Referee: Trevor Kettle

12 December 2016 21	Bolton Wanderers	4–0	Gillingham	Bolton
20:00 GMT	Madine 15', 65'; Vela 28'; Ameobi 80'	Report	Wright (yellow card) 64'	Stadium: Macron Stadium; Attendance: 13,861; Referee: Scott Duncan

17 December 2016 22	Gillingham	1–0	Milton Keynes Dons	Gillingham
15:00 GMT	Wagstaff (yellow card) 25'; McDonald (yellow card) 37' (goal) 72'; Konchesky (yellow card) 41'	Report	Bowditch (penalty missed) 45+1'; Carruthers (yellow card) 56'; Potter (yellow card) 69'; Lewington (yellow card) 90+3'	Stadium: MEMS Priestfield Stadium; Attendance: 5,681; Referee: Brett Huxtable

26 December 2016 23	Peterborough United	1–1	Gillingham	Peterborough
15:00 GMT	Angol 78'	Report	Cargill 90+2'	Stadium: ABAX Stadium; Attendance: 6,239; Referee: Graham Horwood

30 December 2016 24	Millwall	2–1	Gillingham	Bermondsey, London
19:45 GMT	Gregory 13' (yellow card) 90'; Thompson (yellow card) 28'; Onyedinma 63'	Report	Konchesky (yellow card) 58' (yellow-red card) 66'; Wright (yellow card) 70'; Dack (yellow card) 73' (goal) 75'	Stadium: The Den; Attendance: 10,821; Referee: Tim Robinson

2 January 2017 25	Gillingham	0–1	Oxford United	Gillingham
15:00 GMT	Oshilaja (yellow card) 48' (yellow-red card) 76'; Wagstaff (yellow card) 52'; Ehmer (yellow card) 90+1'	Report	MacDonald (yellow card) 11'; Hall (yellow card) 54'; Dunkley 66'; Roberts (yellow card) 90+4'	Stadium: MEMS Priestfield Stadium; Attendance: 6,414; Referee: Lee Swabey

14 January 2017 26	Oldham Athletic	1–0	Gillingham	Oldham
15:00 GMT	Law 39'; Wilson (yellow card) 70'	Report	Konchesky (yellow card) 38'; McDonald (yellow card) 82'; Dack (yellow card) 89'	Stadium: Boundary Park; Attendance: 3,475; Referee: Dean Whitestone

21 January 2017 27	Sheffield United	2–2	Gillingham	Sheffield
15:00 GMT	Sharp 32'; Freeman 61'; Duffy (yellow card) 81'	Report	Wright 51', 58' (yellow card) 55'; Oshilaja (yellow card) 59'	Stadium: Bramall Lane; Attendance: 20,649; Referee: Ben Toner

28 January 2017 28	Gillingham	1–1	Shrewsbury Town	Gillingham
15:00 GMT	Oshilaja 45'	Report	Brown (yellow card) 14'; Rodman 63'; Whalley (yellow card) 67'	Stadium: Priestield Stadium; Attendance: 5,316; Referee: Trevor Kettle

4 February 2017 29	Bradford City	2–2	Gillingham	Bradford
15:00 GMT	Wyke 15'; McMahon 38'	Report	Wright 14'; Dack (yellow card) 36'; Oshilaja 49'; Garmston (yellow card) 73'; Ehmer (yellow card) 87'	Stadium: Valley Parade; Attendance: 18,840; Referee: Richard Clark

11 February 2017 30	Gillingham	1–1	Port Vale	Gillingham
15:00 GMT	Herd (yellow card) 22'; Oshilaja (yellow card) 58'; Donnelly (yellow card) 63'; Parker 90+5'	Report	Streete 49' (yellow card) 77'; Knops (yellow card) 64'	Stadium: MEMS Priestfield Stadium; Attendance: 4,942; Referee: Nick Kinseley

14 February 2017 31	Gillingham	1–1	Chesterfield	Gillingham
19:45 GMT	Dack (yellow card) 45+1'; Ehmer 67'; Donnelly (yellow card) 87'; Nelson (yellow card) 90+5'	Report	Anderson (yellow card) 90+4' (goal) 90+4'	Stadium: MEMS Priestfield Stadium; Attendance: 4,595; Referee: Graham Horwood

18 February 2017 32	Coventry City	2–1	Gillingham	Coventry
15:00 GMT	K. Thomas 16'; G. Thomas 21'	Report	Oshilaja (yellow card) 19'; Byrne (yellow card) 51'; Herd (yellow card) 53'; Ehmer 55'; Garmston (yellow card) 88'	Stadium: Ricoh Arena; Attendance: 8,718; Referee: Michael Salisbury

21 February 2017 33	Gillingham	2–2	AFC Wimbledon	Gillingham
19:45 GMT	Dack 19'; Wright 36'	Report	Taylor 17'; Shea (yellow card) 37'; Barcham 69'	Stadium: MEMS Priestfield Stadium; Attendance: 4,956; Referee: Darren Deadman

25 February 2017 34	Gillingham	2–1	Southend United	Gillingham
15:00 GMT	Wright 41' (pen.), 45+3'	Report	Inniss (yellow card) 27' (yellow-red card) 45+7'; Timlin (yellow card) 75'; Ranger 83'; Cox (yellow card) 90+2'	Stadium: Priestfield Stadium; Attendance: 6,542; Referee: Dean Whitestone

28 February 2017 35	Swindon Town	3–1	Gillingham	Swindon
19:45 GMT	Ince 56'; Obika 61'; Branco 75'	Report	McDonald 10'; Wagstaff (yellow card) 90+4'	Stadium: County Ground; Attendance: 6,133; Referee: Roger East

4 March 2017 36	Bury	1–2	Gillingham	Bury
15:00 GMT	Vaughan 75'	Report	Dack 14'; Quigley (yellow card) 43'; McDonald 47'; Nelson (yellow card) 69'; Parker (yellow card) 81'; Byrne (yellow card) 90+1'	Stadium: Gigg Lane; Attendance: 3,203; Referee: Darren Drysdale

11 March 2017 37	Gillingham	3–2	Scunthorpe United	Gillingham
15:00 GMT	Ehmer (yellow card) 26'; Herd (yellow card) 34'; Wright 77' (pen.), 82' (pen.), 86' (pen.) (yellow card) 86'; Byrne (yellow card) 90+3'	Report	Madden 4' (yellow card) 50' van Veen (yellow card) 70'; Toffolo 73' (yellow card) 85'; Clarke (yellow card) 88'; Toney (yellow card) 89'	Stadium: Priestfield Stadium; Attendance: 6,851; Referee: Robert Lewis

14 March 2017 38	Gillingham	0–4	Bolton Wanderers	Gillingham
19:45 GMT	Muldoon (yellow card) 64'; Byrne (yellow card) 78'	Report	Wheater 3'; Le Fondre 15'; Beevers 45+2'; Vela 49'; Madine (yellow card) 74'	Stadium: Priestfield Stadium; Attendance: 5,199; Referee: Tim Robinson

18 March 2017 39	Rochdale	4–1	Gillingham	Rochdale
15:00 GMT	Mendez-Laing 10' (yellow card) 81'; Henderson 33'; Camps 49'; Rathbone (yellow card) 83'; Vincenti 90'	Report	Parker 17'; Rehman (yellow card) 51' (yellow-red card) 59'; Ehmer (yellow card) 74'	Stadium: Spotland Stadium; Attendance: 2,582; Referee: Andy Haines

25 March 2017 40	Gillingham	0–1	Peterborough United	Gillingham
15:00 GMT	Dack (yellow card) 81'	Report	Grant (yellow card) 36'; Morias 90'	Stadium: Priestfield Stadium; Attendance: 7,561; Referee: Brendan Malone

1 April 2017 41	Milton Keynes Dons	3–2	Gillingham	Milton Keynes
15:00 GMT	Muirhead 5'; Barnes 10'; Williams (yellow card) 69' (yellow-red card) 89'; Baldock (yellow card) 85'; Lewington 90+1'; Bowditch (yellow card) 90+5'	Report	Ehmer (yellow card) 37'; McDonald 56'; Dack (yellow card) 79' (yellow-red card) 90+3'; Oshilaja (yellow card) 86'; Wright 90'	Stadium: Stadium:mk; Attendance: 8,807; Referee: Carl Boyeson

8 April 2017 42	Gillingham	1–1	Millwall	Gillingham
15:00 BST	Martin (yellow card) 22'; Byrne (yellow card) 61'; Quigley 67'; Wright (yellow card) 90'	Report	King (yellow card) 66'; Morison 72'	Stadium: Priestfield Stadium; Attendance: 7,221; Referee: Charles Breakspear

14 April 2017 43	Gillingham	3–1	Bristol Rovers	Gillingham
15:00 BST	Quigley (yellow card) 22'; Wright 64'; Oshilaja (yellow card) 73'; McDonald 90', 90+6'	Report	Harrison (yellow card) 38'; Mansell (yellow card) 48'; Bodin 73' (pen.)	Stadium: Priestfield Stadium; Attendance: 5,916; Referee: Mark Heywood

17 April 2017 44	Chartlon Athletic	3–0	Gillingham	Charlton, London
15:00 BST	Pearce 20'; Holmes 31'; Magennis 54' (yellow card) 60'; Byrne (yellow card) 85'	Report	McDonald (yellow card) 28'; Ehmer (yellow card) 30'; Martin (yellow card) 41'	Stadium: The Valley; Attendance: 12,449; Referee: Brett Huxtable

22 April 2017 45	Gillingham	2–3	Fleetwood Town	Gillingham
15:00 BST	Cairns 38' (o.g.); Donnelly (yellow card) 63' (goal) 65'	Report	Pond (yellow card) 39'; Hunter 54'; Ball 80'; Dempsey 90+2'	Stadium: Priestfield Stadium; Attendance: 8,760; Referee: Chris Sarginson

30 April 2017 46	Northampton Town	0–0	Gillingham	Northampton
12:00 BST	Taylor (yellow card) 42'; Moloney (yellow card) 75'	Report		Stadium: Sixfields Stadium; Attendance: 7,034; Referee: Darren England

=== FA Cup ===
5 November 2016 First round	Gillingham	2–2	Brackley Town	Gillingham
15:00 GMT	Nouble 28', 45'; Hessenthaler (yellow card) 62'; Oshilaja (yellow card) 84'	Report	Gudger 13'; Armson 27' (yellow card) 72'; Myles (yellow card) 61'	Stadium: MEMS Priestfield Stadium; Attendance: 2,410; Referee: Brendan Malone

16 November 2016 First round replay	Brackley Town	4–3 (a.e.t.)	Gillingham	Brackley
19:45 GMT	Armson 17', 26', 105' (yellow card) 115'; Myles (yellow card) 86'; Gudger (yellow card) 92'; Nelson 96' (o.g.)	Report	Hessenthaler 36'; Wagstaff 67' (yellow card) 110'; McDonald 113'; Wright (yellow card) 115'	Stadium: St. James' Park; Attendance: 1,654; Referee: Robert Jones

=== EFL Cup ===
On 22 June 2016, the first round draw was made, Gillingham were drawn away against Southend United.

9 August 2016 First round	Southend United	1-3	Gillingham	Southend
19:45 BST	McLaughlin		McDonald Emannuel-Thomas (2)	Stadium: Roots Hall

23 August 2016 Second round	Watford	1–2 (a.e.t.)	Gillingham	Watford
19:45 BST	Ighalo 57'	Report	Byrne 82' (yellow card) 118'; Dack 102'	Stadium: Vicarage Road; Attendance: 7,004 (849); Referee: James Linington

21 September 2016 Third Round	Tottenham Hotspur	5–0	Gillingham	Tottenham, London
20:00 BST	Eriksen 31', 48'; Onomah (yellow card) 43' (goal) 65'; Janssen 51' (pen.); Lamela 68'	Report		Stadium: White Hart Lane; Attendance: 26,244

=== EFL Trophy ===
Pos	Div	Team	Pld	W	PW	PL	L	GF	GA	GD	Pts	Qualification
1	L1	Millwall	3	3	0	0	0	7	2	+5	9	Advance to Round 2
2	L2	Luton Town	3	2	0	0	1	5	4	+1	6	Advance to Round 2
3	L1	Gillingham	3	1	0	0	2	4	4	0	3	
4	ACA	West Bromwich Albion U21	3	0	0	0	3	0	6	−6	0	

Source: Sky Sports

30 August 2016 Group stage 1	Gillingham	1–2	Luton Town	Gillingham
19:30 BST	List (yellow card) 10'; Oldaker 90'	Report	Musonda 10'; Banton (yellow card) 13'; McQuoid (yellow card) 18'; Smith 24'	Stadium: Priestfield Stadium; Attendance: 2,128; Referee: John Busby

4 October 2016 Group stage 2	Millwall	2–1	Gillingham	Bermondsey, London
19:45 BST	Butcher (yellow card) 14'; Gregory (yellow card) 34'; Chesmain (yellow card) 40'; Williams (yellow card) 45'; Onyedinma 45+4'; Morison (yellow card) 70' (goal) 88'	Report	Wright 17' (yellow card) 89'; Jackson (yellow card) 34'; List (yellow card) 82'	Stadium: The Den; Attendance: 2,104; Referee: Chris Sarginson

8 November 2016 Group stage 3	West Bromwich Albion U23	0–2	Gillingham	West Bromwich
19:45 GMT		Report	Oldaker 45'; Emmanuel-Thomas 55' (pen.); Donnelly (yellow card) 80'	Stadium: The Hawthorns; Attendance: 274; Referee: Nigel Miller
