= 2015–16 Gillingham F.C. season =

English football club season

Gillingham
2015–16 season
- Chairman: Paul Scally
- Manager: Justin Edinburgh
- Stadium: Priestfield Stadium
- League One: 9th
- FA Cup: First round (eliminated by Stevenage)
- League Cup: Second round (eliminated by Birmingham City)
- Football League Trophy: Southern Quarter-final (knocked out by Yeovil Town)
- Kent Senior Cup: Second round (knocked out by Dartford)
- Top goalscorer: League: Bradley Dack (13); All: Bradley Dack (15)
- Highest home attendance: 9,375 vs Millwall (8 May 2016); League One
- Lowest home attendance: 1,832 vs Yeovil Town (10 November 2015); EFL Trophy
- Average home league attendance: 6,316
Home colours	Away colours	Third colours

The 2015–16 season was Gillingham's 123rd season in their existence and third consecutive season in League One. Along with League One, the club competed in the FA Cup, League Cup, Football League Trophy and the regional Kent Senior Cup. The season covers the period from 1 July 2015 to 30 June 2016.

== Transfers ==
=== Transfers in ===
Date from	Position	Nationality	Name	From	Fee	Ref.
1 July 2015	CF	NIR	Rory Donnelly	Swansea City	Free transfer	
1 July 2015	LB	IRL	Bradley Garmston	West Bromwich Albion	Free transfer	
1 July 2015	RB	ENG	Ryan Jackson	Newport County	Free transfer	
1 July 2015	RW	ENG	Elliott List	Crystal Palace	Free transfer	
1 July 2015	CF	ENG	Ben Williamson	Port Vale	Free transfer	
2 July 2015	CB	GER	Max Ehmer	Queens Park Rangers	Free transfer	
7 August 2015	CM	ENG	Josh Wright	Leyton Orient	Free transfer	

=== Transfers out ===
Date from	Position	Nationality	Name	To	Fee	Ref.
1 July 2015	LW	SCO	Danny Galbraith	Free agent	Released	
1 July 2015	RB	TRI	Gavin Hoyte	Barnet (Note: Following Hoyte's release he joined Barnet.)	Free transfer	
1 July 2015	CB	ENG	Leon Legge	Cambridge United (Note: Following Legge's release he joined Cambridge United.)	Free transfer	
1 July 2015	LB	ENG	Joe Martin	Millwall (Note: Following Martin's release he joined Millwall.)	Free transfer	
1 July 2015	RB	ATG	Mahlon Romeo	Millwall	Free transfer	
2 September 2015	CM	WAL	Josh Pritchard	Free agent	Mutual consent	
15 January 2016	FW	ENG	Ben Williamson	Cambridge United	Undisclosed	

=== Loans in ===
Date from	Position	Nationality	Name	From	Date until	Ref.
20 July 2015	DM	ENG	Jordan Houghton	Chelsea	3 January 2016	
24 July 2015	CB	ENG	Adedeji Oshilaja	Cardiff City	3 January 2016	
2 October 2015	CB	ENG	Harry Lennon	Charlton Athletic	20 November 2015	
13 November 2015	FW	ENG	Dominic Samuel	Reading	8 May 2016	
27 January 2016	LB	ENG	Adam Chicksen	Brighton & Hove Albion	17 March 2016	
12 February 2016	FW	WAL	George Williams	Fulham	8 May 2016	
26 February 2016	CB	EGY	Adam El-Abd	Bristol City	8 May 2016	
19 March 2016	MF	WAL	Andrew Crofts	Brighton & Hove Albion	8 May 2016	

=== Loans out ===
Date from	Position	Nationality	Name	To	Date until	Ref.
15 August 2015	CB	ENG	Callum Davies	Bromley	15 September 2015	
22 September 2015	CB	ENG	Callum Davies	Eastleigh	24 October 2015	
1 October 2015	CF	ENG	Greg Cundle	East Grinstead Town	9 November 2015	
10 February 2016	CF	ENG	Greg Cundle	Tilbury	4 March 2016	
4 March 2016	CF	ENG	Greg Cundle	Margate	4 April 2016	
30 March 2016	CB	ENG	Mitchell Dickenson	Hastings United	3 April 2016	

== Competitions ==
=== Pre-season friendlies ===
7 July 2015 Friendly	Folkestone Invicta	0–3	Gillingham	Folkestone
19:45 BST		Report	Donnelly 26'; McDonald 48'; Dack 63'	Stadium: Fullicks Stadium; Attendance: 534; Referee: N. Dunn

11 July 2015 Friendly	Tonbridge Angels	1–2	Gillingham	Tonbridge
15:00 BST	Pearson 68'	Report	Norris 45'; Egan 87'	Stadium: Longmead Stadium; Referee: Jeff Lengthorn

21 July 2015 Friendly	Bromley	1–2	Gillingham	Bromley
19:45 BST	Goldberg 80'	Report	Williamson 15'; Dack 30'	Stadium: Fortress Stadium

25 July 2015 Friendly	Dover Athletic	1–1	Gillingham	River
15:00 BST	Miller 17'	Report	Dickenson 2'	Stadium: Crabble Athletic Ground; Referee: Nigel Lugg

27 July 2015 Friendly	Chatham Town	1–1	Gillingham XI	Chatham
19:30 BST	Dalehouse 35'	Report	Stevenson 61'	Stadium: The Sports Ground

29 July 2015 Friendly	Gillingham	1–2	Brighton & Hove Albion	Gillingham
19:45 BST	Dack 47'	Report	Stephens 56'; Kandi 66'	Stadium: Priestfield Stadium; Referee: Gavin Ward

1 August 2015 Friendly	Gillingham	0–0	Portsmouth	Gillingham
15:00 BST		Report		Stadium: Priestfield Stadium; Referee: Fred Graham

4 August 2015 Friendly	Faversham Town	1–0	Gillingham XI	Faversham
19:45 BST	Wilson 53'	Report		Stadium: Shepherd Neame Stadium

=== League One ===
==== League table ====
Pos	Team	Pld	W	D	L	GF	GA	GD	Pts
7	Scunthorpe United	46	21	11	14	60	47	+13	74
8	Coventry City	46	19	12	15	67	49	+18	69
9	Gillingham	46	19	12	15	71	56	+15	69
10	Rochdale	46	19	12	15	68	61	+7	69
11	Sheffield United	46	18	12	16	64	59	+5	66

Updated to match(es) played on 1 July 2016. Source: BBC Sport
Rules for classification: 1) Points; 2) Goal difference; 3) Number of goals scored

==== Matches ====
On 17 June 2015, the fixtures for the season were announced.

8 August 2015 1	Gillingham	4–0	Sheffield United	Gillingham
15:00 BST	Norris 8'; Oshilaja 43'; Egan 82'; Dack 90'	Report	Freeman (yellow card) 90+3'	Stadium: Priestfield Stadium; Attendance: 7,511; Referee: Lee Collins

15 August 2015 2	Port Vale	1–1	Gillingham	Burslem
15:00 BST	Purkiss (yellow card) 29'; Dodds 35'	Report	Dack 17'; Oshilaja (yellow card) 25'; Jackson (yellow card) 28'; Garmston (yellow card) 31'; Houghton (yellow card) 54'; Dack (yellow card) 67'; Egan (yellow card) 75'	Stadium: Vale Park; Attendance: 5,067; Referee: Fred Graham

18 August 2015 3	Bradford City	1–2	Gillingham	Bradford
19:45 BST	Hanson 7'	Report	Norris 51'; Hanson 71'	Stadium: Valley Parade; Attendance: 17,496; Referee: Darren Handley

22 August 2015 4	Gillingham	2–0	Wigan Athletic	Gillingham
15:00 BST	Dack 37', 82' (pen.)	Report		Stadium: Priestfield Stadium; Attendance: 5,692; Referee: Iain Williamson

29 August 2015 5	Peterborough United	1–1	Gillingham	Peterborough
15:00 BST	Taylor 90'	Report	Oshilaja 85'	Stadium: London Road; Attendance: 5,083; Referee: Keith Stroud

5 September 2015 6	Gillingham	1–0	Doncaster Rovers	Gillingham
15:00 BST	Hessenthaler 66'	Report		Stadium: Priestfield Stadium; Attendance: 5,685; Referee: Chris Sarginson

12 September 2015 7	Gillingham	2–1	Blackpool	Gillingham
15:00 BST	Loft 17'; Dack 81'	Report	Jackson 51' (o.g.)	Stadium: Priestfield Stadium; Attendance: 6,231; Referee: Gary Sutton

19 September 2015 8	Colchester United	2–1	Gillingham	Colchester
15:00 BST	Massey 4'; Harriott 29'	Report	Norris 7'	Stadium: Colchester Community Stadium; Attendance: 4,694; Referee: Charles Breakspear

26 September 2015 9	Barnsley	2–0	Gillingham	Barnsley
15:00 BST	Pearson 18'; Winnall 45'	Report		Stadium: Oakwell; Attendance: 8,354; Referee: Darren Deadman

29 September 2015 10	Gillingham	5–1	Fleetwood Town	Gillingham
19:45 BST	Donnelly 18', 34'; Houghton 28'; Egan 31'; McDonald 87'	Report	Grant 12'; Jónsson (red card) 81'	Stadium: Priestfield Stadium; Attendance: 5,231; Referee: Tim Robinson

3 October 2015 11	Gillingham	3–3	Oldham Athletic	Gillingham
15:00 BST	Donnelly 8' 33'; Hessenthaler 57'	Report	Dickenson 28' (o.g.); Poleon 36'; Higdon 55'	Stadium: Priestfield Stadium; Attendance: 6,157; Referee: James Adcock

10 October 2015 12	Chesterfield	1–3	Gillingham	Chesterfield
15:00 BST	Simons 35'	Report	Egan 26'; Donnelly 54'; Lennon 72'	Stadium: Proact Stadium; Attendance: 6,026; Referee: Nick Kinseley

17 October 2015 13	Crewe Alexandra	0–1	Gillingham	Crewe
15:00 BST		Report	Donnelly 90+2'	Stadium: Alexandra Stadium; Attendance: 3,924; Referee: David Webb

20 October 2015 14	Gillingham	2–1	Scunthorpe United	Gillingham
19:45 BST	Dickenson 59'; Wright (red card) 81'; Lennon 90+2'	Report	Laird 53'	Stadium: Priestfield Stadium; Attendance: 4,823; Referee: Lee Swabey

24 October 2015 15	Gillingham	1–1	Southend United	Gillingham
15:00 BST	Loft 89'	Report	McLaughlin 11'	Stadium: Priestfield Stadium; Attendance: 6,981; Referee: Ben Toner

31 October 2015 16	Walsall	3–2	Gillingham	Walsall
15:00 GMT	Morris 37'; Lalkovič 38'; Demetriou 90+1'	Report	McDonald 12'; Dack 32' (pen.)	Stadium: Banks's Stadium; Attendance: 6,663; Referee: Darren Drysdale

14 November 2015 17	Gillingham	3–1	Bury	Gillingham
15:00 GMT	Samuel 6'; Egan 10'; Osadebe 87'	Report	Clarke 4'	Stadium: Priestfield Stadium; Attendance: 6,063; Referee: Keith Stroud

21 November 2015 18	Coventry City	4–1	Gillingham	Coventry
15:00 GMT	Murphy 34' 41' 44'; Tuner 37'	Report	Dack 63'	Stadium: Ricoh Arena; Attendance: 15,604; Referee: Mark Brown

24 November 2015 19	Gillingham	2–0	Rochdale	Gillingham
19:45 GMT	Dack 7'; Oshilaja 80'	Report		Stadium: Priestfield Stadium; Attendance: 5,088; Referee: Stuart Attwell

28 November 2015 20	Shrewsbury Town	2–2	Gillingham	Shrewsbury
15:00 GMT	Oshilaja 31' (o.g.); Collins 70'	Report	McDonald 37'; Jackson 59'	Stadium: New Meadow; Attendance: 4,959; Referee: Kevin Wright

12 December 2015 21	Gillingham	0–3	Burton Albion	Gillingham
15:00 GMT		Report	McCrory 59'; Akins 90'; O'Connor 90+6'	Stadium: Priestfield Stadium; Attendance: 6,230; Referee: Andy Woolmer

19 December 2015 22	Millwall	0–3	Gillingham	Bermondsey
15:00 GMT	Archer (red card) 25'	Report	Samuel 20', 89'; Dack 63' (pen.)	Stadium: New Den; Attendance: 12,032; Referee: Darren Handley

26 December 2015 23	Swindon Town	1–3	Gillingham	Swindon
15:00 GMT	Obika 25'; Branco (yellow card) 44' (red card) 84'; Kasim (yellow card) 90'; Barry (yellow card) 90+'	Report	Hessenthaler (yellow card) 16', (goal) 35'; Dack 19', (yellow card) 65'; Oshilaja (yellow card) 64'; Jackson (yellow card) 65', (goal) 69'	Stadium: County Ground (Swindon); Attendance: 9,228; Referee: Fred Graham

28 December 2015 24	Gillingham	1–0	Colchester United	Gillingham
15:00 GMT	Samuel 70'; Garmston (yellow card) 79'	Report	Massey (yellow card) 57'; Briggs (yellow card) 90+3'	Stadium: Priestfield Stadium; Attendance: 7,109; Referee: Iain Williamson

2 January 2016 25	Gillingham	3–0	Bradford City	Gillingham
15:00 GMT	Dack 4'; Donnelly 11'; Loft 89'	Report	Clarke (red card) 90+6'	Stadium: Priestfield Stadium; Attendance: 6,446; Referee: (England) Paul Gibbs

7 January 2016 26	Wigan Athletic	3–2	Gillingham	Wigan
19:45 GMT	Jacobs (yellow card) 60'; Grigg 64'; Power 67', (yellow card) 90+1'; Morgan 90+6'	Report	Samuel 24'; Donnelly 53'; McGlashan (yellow card) 90+3'	Stadium: DW Stadium; Attendance: 7,923; Referee: (England) Scott Duncan

16 January 2016 27	Doncaster Rovers	2–2	Gillingham	Doncaster
15:00 GMT	Stewart 75'; Williams 88'	Report	Donnelly 9', 47'; Samuel (yellow card) 72'	Stadium: Keepmoat Stadium; Attendance: 6,077; Referee: (England) Nigel Miller

23 January 2016 28	Gillingham	2–1	Peterborough United	Gillingham
15:00 GMT	Egan (yellow card) 24'; Norris 49', (yellow card) 84'; Dack 65'	Report	Smith (yellow card) 22'; Oztumer 25'	Stadium: Priestfield Stadium; Attendance: 6,449; Referee: (England) James Adcock

30 January 2016 29	Blackpool	1–0	Gillingham	Blackpool
15:00 GMT	Redshaw 45' (pen.); Cullen (yellow card) 66'; Norris (yellow card) 75'	Report	Morris (yellow card) 44'; Ehmer (yellow card) 53'	Stadium: Bloomfield Road; Attendance: 6,828; Referee: (England) Andy Madley

6 February 2016 30	Gillingham	0–0	Swindon Town	Gillingham
15:00 GMT		Report	Kasim (yellow card) 68'	Stadium: Priestfield Stadium; Attendance: 6,398; Referee: (England) Andy Woolmer

13 February 2016 31	Gillingham	2–1	Barnsley	Gillingham
15:00 GMT	Samuel 25'; Donnelly (yellow card) 44'; Dack 63'	Report	Hourihane 62'	Stadium: Priestfield Stadium; Attendance: 5,887; Referee: (England) Darren Bond

20 February 2016 32	Oldham Athletic	2–1	Gillingham	Oldham
15:00 GMT	Dieng 57'; Kelly (yellow card) 61'; Palmer (yellow card) 61'; Forte 73'	Report	Loft 16', (yellow card) 59'	Stadium: SportsDirect.com Park; Attendance: 3,874; Referee: David Coote

27 February 2016 33	Gillingham	1–2	Chesterfield	Gillingham
15:00 GMT	Ehmer (yellow card) 13'; Jackson (yellow card) 26'; Osadebe 80'	Report	Dimaio (yellow card) 36'; Ebanks-Blake 36'; Novak 45+3'; O'Shea (yellow card) 90+3'	Stadium: Priestfield Stadium; Attendance: 6,012; Referee: Kevin Johnson

March 1, 2016 34	Fleetwood Town	2–1	Gillingham	Fleetwood
19:45 GMT	Burns 3'; Ameobi 9'; Hunter (yellow card) 70'	Report	Norris 36'; List (yellow card) 90'	Stadium: Highbury Stadium; Attendance: 2,133; Referee: Jeremy Simpson

5 March 2016 35	Scunthorpe United	0–0	Gillingham	Scunthorpe
15:00 GMT	O'Brien (yellow card) 59'; Ness (yellow card) 90+2'	Report	Morris (yellow card) 40'; Hessenthaler (yellow card) 87'	Stadium: Glanford Park; Attendance: 3,355; Referee: Darren Deadman

December 03 36	Gillingham	3–0	Crewe Alexandra	Gillingham
15:00 GMT	Samuel 12'; El-Abd (yellow card) 38'; Guthrie 61' (o.g.); Wright 90+2'	Report	Nugent (yellow card) 67'	Stadium: Priestfield Stadium; Attendance: 5,656; Referee: Keith Hill

19 March 2016 37	Southend United	1–1	Gillingham	Southend-on-Sea
15:00 GMT	Wordsworth 21'; Coker (yellow card) 33'	Report	Crofts (yellow card) 31'; Oshilaja (yellow card) 45'; Norris 53'; McGlashan (yellow card) 77'; Ehmer (yellow card) 87'	Stadium: Roots Hall; Attendance: 9,135; Referee: Dean Whitestone

28 March 2016 38	Bury	0–1	Gillingham	Bury
15:00 BST	Clarke (yellow card) 81'	Report	Norris 27', (yellow card) 57'; Oshilaja (yellow card) 79'; Wright (yellow card) 90+4'; El-Abd (yellow card) 90+9'	Stadium: Gigg Lane; Attendance: 2,907; Referee: Oliver Langford

2 April 2016 39	Gillingham	0–0	Coventry City	Gillingham
15:00 BST	Nelson (yellow card) 90+1'	Report	Bigirimana (yellow card) 90'	Stadium: Priestfield Stadium; Attendance: 7,200; Referee: Chris Sarginson

9 April 2016 40	Sheffield United	0–0	Gillingham	Sheffield
15:00 BST	Edgar (yellow card) 26'; Sharp (yellow card) 80'	Report	Ehmer (yellow card) 19'; Wright (yellow card) 45+1'; Dickenson (yellow card) 52'; Oshilaja (yellow card) 81'; Norris (yellow card) 88'	Stadium: Bramall Lane; Attendance: 18,152; Referee: Rob Lewis

12 April 2016 41	Gillingham	1–2	Walsall	Gillingham
19:45 BST	Norris 90+5'; Dickenson (yellow card) 90+7'	Report	Chambers (yellow card) 47'; Lalkovič 68'; Hiwula 77'; Demetriou (yellow card) 90+6'	Stadium: Priestfield Stadium; Attendance: 6,246; Referee: Stuart Attwell

16 April 2016 42	Gillingham	0–2	Port Vale	Gillingham
15:00 BST	Jackson (yellow card) 45+3'; Donnelly (yellow card) 58'; Dack (yellow card) 62'; Ehmer (yellow card) 82'; Morris (yellow card) 90+7'	Report	Leitch-Smith 19'; Dickinson 21'; O'Connor (yellow card) 45+1'; Alnwick (yellow card) 75'; Grant (yellow card) 90+5'	Stadium: Priestfield Stadium; Attendance: 5,887; Referee: Ross Joyce

19 April 2016 43	Rochdale	1–1	Gillingham	Rochdale
19:45 BST	Camps 45'; Rose (yellow card) 56'	Report	Egan 77'; Hessenthaler (yellow card) 80'	Stadium: Spotland Stadium; Attendance: 2,385; Referee: Kevin Wright

23 April 2016 44	Gillingham	2–3	Shrewsbury Town	Gillingham
15:00 BST	Morris (yellow card) 35'; McDonald 45+3'; Hessenthaler 61'	Report	Kaikai 16'; Whitbread (yellow card) 33'; Wesolowski (yellow card) 44'; Mangan 56'; Akpa Akro 81', (yellow card) 90+4'; Hendry (yellow card) 90'	Stadium: Priestfield Stadium; Attendance: 6,906; Referee: Lee Swabey

30 April 2016 45	Burton Albion	2–1	Gillingham	Burton upon Trent
15:00 BST	Akins 44'; Beavon (yellow card) 68'; Naylor 90+2'	Report	McDonald 49'; Ehmer (yellow card) 75'; Loft (yellow card) 82'	Stadium: Pirelli Stadium; Attendance: 5,388; Referee: Tony Harrington

8 May 2016 46	Gillingham	1–2	Millwall	Gillingham
12:30 BST	Dack (yellow card) 79'; Egan 90+2'	Report	O'Brien 55'; Romeo (red card) 86'; Archer (yellow card) 90+2'; Taylor (yellow card) 90+5'; Gregory 90+8' (pen.)	Stadium: Priestfield Stadium; Attendance: 9,375; Referee: Paul Tierney

=== League Cup ===
11 August 2015 First round	Plymouth Argyle	1–2	Gillingham	Plymouth
19:45 BST	Tanner 78'	Report	Dack 85'; Hessenthaler 87'	Stadium: Home Park; Attendance: 5,120; Referee: Kevin Johnson

25 August 2015 Second round	Birmingham City	2–0	Gillingham	Birmingham
19:45 BST	Thomas 35', 72'	Report		Stadium: St Andrew's

=== Football League Trophy ===
6 October 2015 Second round	Gillingham	2–1	Luton Town	Gillingham
19:45 BST	Ehmer 65'; Dack 83'	Summary	McGeehan 41'	Stadium: Priestfield Stadium; Attendance: 3,428

10 November 2015 Southern QF	Gillingham	1–1 (4–5 p)	Yeovil Town	Gillingham
19:15 BST	Garmston 43'	Summary	Cornick 13'	Stadium: Priestfield Stadium; Attendance: 1,832

=== FA Cup ===
7 November 2015 1st Round	Stevenage	3–0	Gillingham	Stevenage
15:00	Schumacher 13'; Whelpdale 29'; Gnanduillet 90+2'	Report		Stadium: The Lamex Stadium; Attendance: 1,619
