= Stuart Nelson =

English footballer (born 1981)

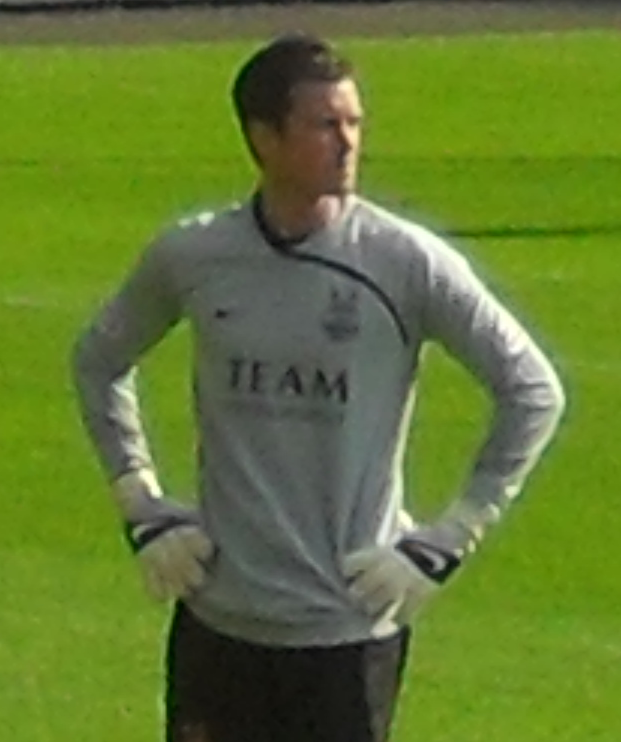
- Nelson playing for Aberdeen in 2009

Personal information
- Full name: Stuart James Nelson
- Date of birth: 17 September 1981 (age 45)
- Place of birth: Stroud, England
- Height: 6 ft 1 in (1.85 m)
- Position: Goalkeeper

Youth career
- FC Battledown
- Cirencester College Football Academy

Senior career*
Years	Team	Apps	(Gls)
1998–2000	Cirencester Town		
2000–2002	Millwall	0	(0)
2002–2003	Doncaster Rovers	2	(0)
2003–2004	Hucknall Town	20	(0)
2004–2007	Brentford	116	(0)
2007–2008	Leyton Orient	30	(0)
2008–2009	Norwich City	0	(0)
2009–2010	Aberdeen	3	(0)
2010–2012	Notts County	79	(0)
2012–2018	Gillingham	195	(0)
2018–2020	Yeovil Town	40	(0)
2020–2021	Crawley Town	1	(0)
2021	Dorking Wanderers	7	(0)
2022	Sutton United	2	(0)
2022–2023	Dover Athletic	41	(0)
2023–2024	Cirencester Town	36	(0)
2023	→ Folkestone Invicta (loan)	1	(0)
- * Club domestic league appearances and goals as of 19:56, 31 December 2024 (UTC)

Stuart James Nelson (born 17 September 1981) is an English professional footballer who plays as a goalkeeper most recently for Cirencester Town.

== Career ==
Born in Stroud, Gloucestershire, Nelson started his career at Cheltenham youth club FC Battledown. He also played for the Cirencester College Football Academy team, Millwall and Cirencester Town. County Cup success led to him being spotted by Northern Premier League side Hucknall Town after a spell with Doncaster Rovers.

=== Brentford ===
Nelson joined Brentford from Hucknall in February 2004 for a fee of £10,000. He was sent off on his debut against Brighton & Hove Albion. He completed his first full season with Brentford in 2004–05, maintaining 21 clean sheets and helping the team into the promotion play-offs. He signed a new two-year contract in August 2005.

Nelson was appointed club captain for the 2006–07 season and scored the decisive penalty in a League Cup first round shootout win over Swindon Town. However, a ligament injury picked up in October meant that he was unable to play again until 2007. He returned and played 6 games towards the end of the season. He was released by Brentford on 16 May 2007.

=== Leyton Orient ===
Nelson signed for Leyton Orient in summer 2007, but left less than a year later by mutual consent due to relocating issues. On 1 August 2008, Norwich City confirmed the signing of Nelson after he impressed Glenn Roeder while on trial at Carrow Road. He was released at the end of his one-year contract the following summer having made no first team appearances.

=== Aberdeen ===
On 27 July 2009, Nelson signed a one-year contract with Scottish Premier League team Aberdeen. In May 2010 Nelson turned down an offer of a new contract.

=== Notts County ===
On 23 June 2010, Nelson signed a two-year contract with League One team Notts County. Upon his signing for Notts County, he became the first choice goalkeeper; a position he retained in the 2011–12 season. However, on 9 May 2012, he was released by Notts County along with 12 of his teammates.

=== Gillingham ===
On 20 July 2012, Nelson signed for Football League Two side Gillingham on a free transfer, on a two-year deal. He made his debut for Gillingham on 18 August 2012 against Bradford City. In his first season with the club Nelson won the League Two title and was runner up at the Player of the Season awards.

He received the club's player of the year award for the 2013–14 season. In May 2014, Nelson signed a new two-year contract, and in June 2016 signed a further two-year contract with the club. He was named Vice-Captain for the 2016–17 season. He made his 200th start for the team in December 2016. On 5 December 2017, Nelson made his 223rd competitive appearance for Gillingham which took him to 3rd on all time appearances for a goalkeeper for the club. Only Ron Hillyard (1st) and John Simpson (2nd) have played more times in goal for the club. The following month, however, Nelson left Gillingham having agreed the termination of his contract.

=== Yeovil Town ===
On 20 February 2018, Nelson signed for League Two side Yeovil Town until the end of the season. He signed a new contract with Yeovil at the end of the 2017–18 season. He was released at the end of the 2019–20 season as a result of budget cuts.

=== Crawley Town ===
On 7 November 2020, Nelson signed for League Two side Crawley Town on a three-month deal. On 12 January 2021, Nelson signed a contract extension to remain at the club until the end of the 2020-21 season.

=== Dorking Wanderers ===
On 8 October 2021, Nelson signed for National League South side Dorking Wanderers. On 8 December 2021, it was confirmed that Nelson had left the club.

=== Sutton United ===
On 15 January 2022, Nelson signed for League Two side Sutton United. Nelson was released at the end of the season having made two appearances for the club.

=== Dover Athletic ===
On 18 June 2022, Nelson agreed to join recently relegated National League South club Dover Athletic.

== Personal life ==
Nelson played rugby as a youngster and represented Gloucestershire.

== Career statistics ==
As of match played 7 May 2022

Appearances and goals by club, season and competition
Club	Season	League			National Cup		League Cup		Other		Total	
Club	Season	Division	Apps	Goals	Apps	Goals	Apps	Goals	Apps	Goals	Apps	Goals
Doncaster Rovers	2002–03	Football Conference	2	0	0	0	—		0	0	2	0
Hucknall Town	2003–04	Northern Premier League	20	0	No appearance data available							
Brentford	2003–04	League Two	9	0	0	0	0	0	0	0	9	0
Brentford	2004–05	League One	43	0	9	0	1	0	2 (Note: Appearances in the League One play-offs)	0	55	0
Brentford	2005–06	League One	45	0	6	0	1	0	2	0	54	0
Brentford	2006–07	League One	19	0	0	0	2	0	0	0	21	0
Brentford	Total		136	0	15	0	4	0	4	0	159	0
Leyton Orient	2007–08	League One	30	0	1	0	2	0	0	0	33	0
Norwich City	2008–09	Championship	0	0	0	0	0	0	—		0	0
Aberdeen	2009–10	Scottish Premier League	3	0	0	0	0	0	0	0	3	0
Notts County	2010–11	League One	33	0	3	0	2	0	0	0	38	0
Notts County	2011–12	League One	46	0	4	0	1	0	1 (Note: Appearances in the Football League Trophy)	0	52	0
Notts County	Total		79	0	7	0	3	0	1	0	90	0
Gillingham	2012–13	League Two	45	0	1	0	2	0	0	0	48	0
Gillingham	2013–14	League One	46	0	2	0	1	0	1	0	50	0
Gillingham	2014–15	League One	24	0	1	0	0	0	5	0	30	0
Gillingham	2015–16	League One	46	0	1	0	2	0	2	0	51	0
Gillingham	2016–17	League One	34	0	2	0	3	0	3	0	42	0
Gillingham	2017–18	League One	0	0	0	0	0	0	2	0	2	0
Gillingham	Total		195	0	7	0	8	0	13	0	223	0
Yeovil Town	2017–18	League Two	5	0	—		—		—		5	0
Yeovil Town	2018–19	League Two	12	0	0	0	0	0	1	0	13	0
Yeovil Town	2019–20	National League	23	0	2	0	—		2 (Note: One appearance in the FA Trophy, one appearance in National League play-offs)	0	27	0
Yeovil Town	Total		40	0	2	0	0	0	3	0	45	0
Crawley Town	2020–21	League Two	1	0	1	0	0	0	1	0	3	0
Dorking Wanderers	2021–22	National League South	7	0	2	0	—		1 (Note: Appearances in the FA Trophy)	0	10	0
Sutton United	2021–22	League Two	2	0	—		—		0	0	2	0
Dover Athletic	2022–23	National League South	41	0	1	0	—		1	0	43	0
Cirencester Town	2023–24	Southern League; Division One Central	36	0	0	0	—		1	0	38	0
Folkestone Invicta (loan)	2023–24	Isthmian League Premier Division	1	0	—		—		—		1	0
Career total			573	0	36	0	17	0	25	0	651	0

== Honours ==
Gillingham

- Football League Two: 2012–13

Sutton United

- EFL Trophy runner-up: 2021–22

Individual

- PFA Team of the Year: 2012–13 League Two
- Gillingham Player of the Season: 2013–14
