= Max Ehmer =

German footballer

- Ehmer in 2023

Personal information
- Full name: Maximilian Andreas Ehmer
- Date of birth: 3 February 1992 (age 34)
- Place of birth: Frankfurt, Germany
- Height: 6 ft 2 in (1.88 m)
- Position: Defender

Team information
- Current team: Farnborough
- Number: 6

Youth career
- Ascot United
- 2003–2009: Queens Park Rangers

Senior career*
Years	Team	Apps	(Gls)
2009–2015	Queens Park Rangers	1	(0)
2011	→ Yeovil Town (loan)	27	(0)
2011–2012	→ Yeovil Town (loan)	24	(0)
2012	→ Preston North End (loan)	9	(0)
2013	→ Stevenage (loan)	6	(1)
2013–2014	→ Carlisle United (loan)	9	(0)
2014–2015	→ Gillingham (loan)	27	(1)
2015–2020	Gillingham	192	(11)
2020–2021	Bristol Rovers	28	(1)
2021–2025	Gillingham	164	(1)
2025–2026	Ebbsfleet United	17	(0)
2026–	Farnborough	11	(0)
- * Club domestic league appearances and goals as of 21:47, 22 October 2026 (UTC)

Maximilian Andreas Ehmer (born 3 February 1992) is a German professional footballer who plays as a defender for National League South club Farnborough.

A product of Queens Park Rangers' youth academy, Ehmer signed his first professional contract at the age of 17 in 2009. Two years later, in January 2011, he joined League One team Yeovil Town on loan on a deal that would ultimately run for the remainder of the 2010–11 season. He returned to Yeovil on a six-month loan deal for the following season, and ended the campaign on loan at another League One club in the form of Preston North End. In August 2012, Ehmer signed a new three-year deal at QPR. In March 2013, he was loaned out, this time joining Stevenage on loan until the end of the 2012–13 season.

On 28 September 2013, Ehmer made his QPR debut after four years at the club, coming on as a 78th-minute substitute for the injured Clint Hill, in a 2–0 league win against Middlesbrough at Loftus Road.

== Career ==
=== Queens Park Rangers ===
Ehmer joined Queens Park Rangers at the age of eleven and progressed through the youth ranks, captaining his age group at various stages. He had previously played for Ascot United at the age of eight, as well as competing at varsity level during his time at ACS Egham School. During his time playing for the Warfield Predator youth side, aged eleven, he attracted the interest of QPR, who took him into their academy set-up in 2003. He signed his first professional contract with the club in the summer of 2009, aged 17. Ehmer made his league debut for QPR coming on as a substitute for Rangers captain Clint Hill in the 2–0 win over Middlesbrough on 28 September 2013.

==== Loan spells ====
Ehmer experienced his first taste of first-team football when he signed for League One side Yeovil Town on a month-long loan on 31 December 2010, with the deal to be officially completed the next day. He made his debut against Plymouth Argyle on 1 January 2011, playing the whole match in a 0–0 draw at Home Park. After impressing in the first two weeks of the loan spell, with Yeovil having secured two victories and one draw without conceding a goal, it was announced that Ehmer would remain at the club for the remainder of the 2010–11 season. He went on to make 27 appearances during the second half of the campaign, with a good end of season run ensuring Yeovil finished in a comfortable mid-table position. The final game of his loan spell was a 2–0 away victory at Carlisle United on 7 May 2011, in which Ehmer was used a half-time substitute.

He returned to QPR following the end of his loan agreement, and subsequently signed a new one-year contract extension with the club in June 2011, keeping him contracted to the club until 2013. QPR manager Neil Warnock stated – "Max has made great progress over the last few months. He had a very productive spell at Yeovil and the feedback we received was very promising. The experience he gained there will stand him in good stead to really push on over the next 12 months or so". Shortly before the start of the 2011–12 campaign, on 21 July 2011, Ehmer returned to Yeovil on loan, this time on a six-month deal. He played in the club's first game of the new season, playing the first 56 minutes in a 2–0 away loss to Brentford. Ehmer scored his first professional goal in a Football League Trophy tie against Bournemouth on 5 October 2011, netting a late consolation strike from close range in a match Yeovil lost 3–2 at Dean Court. In December the same year, his loan deal was extended until the end of the season. However, having made 28 appearances in all competitions during his second loan spell, Ehmer returned to QPR on 19 January 2012, with his loan deal being terminated by mutual consent following a change in management at both Yeovil and his parent club.

After a brief spell back at QPR, without making any first-team appearances, Ehmer was loaned out, this time joining League One side Preston North End on 16 March 2012, on loan until 5 May. He made his debut in the Preston's 2–1 away victory at Exeter City a day after joining the club, coming on as an 89th-minute substitute. Ehmer went on to make nine appearances during his time at the club, before returning to QPR at the end of the 2011–12 season. In August 2012, Ehmer signed a new three-year contract at QPR, keeping him at the club until 2016. In March 2013, Ehmer joined League One side Stevenage on loan for the remainder of the 2012–13 season. He made his debut for the club a day after signing, on 29 March, playing the whole in a 1–1 draw away to Crawley Town. In the club's next match just three days later, Ehmer scored the only goal of the game as Stevenage secured a 1–0 home win over Hartlepool United. Playing at left back, he scored with a first-time finish after Filipe Morais' initial shot had been blocked, scoring with just fifteen minutes remaining. Ehmer made six appearances during the brief loan spell, scoring once, as he returned to his parent club following Stevenage's final game of the season.

On 4 November 2013, Ehmer joined League One side Carlisle United on loan for a month up to and including 1 December 2013. On 3 December 2013, two days after his original loan expired it was announced that Carlisle had extended Ehmer's loan at the club until 2 January 2014. In November of the same year he was loaned out, this time to League One side Gillingham.

=== Gillingham ===
On 2 July 2015, Ehmer joined League One side Gillingham on a three-year deal.

In January 2017 he was named as Gillingham's captain, with the recently appointed head coach Adrian Pennock commenting that "I like his attitude and I like the centre-half to be the captain". He would later lose the captaincy to Gabriel Zakuani but regained it when he suffered an injury and was named captain permanently when Steve Evans became Gillingham manager before the 2019–20 season.

In March 2018 he agreed a contract extension until the end of the 2019–20 season.

Ehmer made his 200th appearance for the club in a 1–0 victory over Oxford United on 9 March 2019.

=== Bristol Rovers ===
On 21 July 2020, Ehmer signed a two-year contract with Bristol Rovers following the expiration of his Gillingham contract. Ehmer was announced as Rovers captain on 4 September 2020 and made his debut the following day in a 3–0 EFL Cup defeat to Ipswich Town. He scored his first goal of the season in the FA Cup third round 3–2 defeat to Premier League side Sheffield United.

When Rovers' third manager of the season Joey Barton came in, Ehmer was stripped of his captaincy which was given to Luke Leahy. On 22 March 2021, Ehmer was publicly slated by his manager who claimed that Ehmer was the wrong choice for captain and would have a lot of work to do to force his way back into the side. Following this, Barton announced that Ehmer would have to have surgery on his shoulder injury that would see him miss the remainder of the season. On 15 June 2021, Ehmer's contract with the club was terminated.

=== Gillingham return ===
Having had his contract in Bristol terminated, Ehmer returned to Gillingham that same day on a two-year contract.

On 14 May 2023, Gillingham confirmed that Ehmer had signed a new contract with the Kent side, but did not disclose the length of the deal. On 27 April 2024, Ehmer made his 400th appearance for the club in a 2–2 draw with Doncaster Rovers. On 25 April 2025, the club confirmed that Ehmer would be leaving at the end of his contract after playing a total of 439 times for the Gills, leaving him as one of the highest appearance makers in the club's history.

=== Ebbsfleet United ===
On 27 June 2025, Ehmer agreed to join National League South side Ebbsfleet United.

=== Farnborough ===
On 22 June 2026, Ehmer agreed to join fellow National League South side, Farnborough.

== Personal life ==
Ehmer was born in Frankfurt.

== Career statistics ==
As of match played 17 October 2026

Appearances and goals by club, season and competition
Club	Season	League			FA Cup		League Cup		Other		Total	
Club	Season	Division	Apps	Goals	Apps	Goals	Apps	Goals	Apps	Goals	Apps	Goals
Queens Park Rangers	2009–10	Championship	0	0	0	0	0	0	—		0	0
Queens Park Rangers	2010–11	Championship	0	0	0	0	0	0	—		0	0
Queens Park Rangers	2011–12	Premier League	0	0	0	0	0	0	—		0	0
Queens Park Rangers	2012–13	Premier League	0	0	0	0	0	0	—		0	0
Queens Park Rangers	2013–14	Championship	1	0	0	0	0	0	—		1	0
Queens Park Rangers	Total		1	0	0	0	0	0	—		1	0
Yeovil Town (loan)	2010–11	League One	27	0	0	0	0	0	0	0	27	0
Yeovil Town (loan)	2011–12	League One	24	0	3	0	0	0	1 (Note: Appearance(s) in the Football League Trophy)	1	28	1
Yeovil Town (loan)	Total		51	0	3	0	0	0	1	1	55	1
Preston North End (loan)	2011–12	League One	9	0	—		—		—		9	0
Stevenage (loan)	2012–13	League One	6	1	0	0	0	0	0	0	6	1
Carlisle United (loan)	2013–14	League One	12	1	1	0	0	0	1	0	14	1
Gillingham (loan)	2014–15	League One	27	1	0	0	0	0	2	0	29	1
Gillingham	2015–16	League One	30	0	1	0	1	0	1	1	33	1
Gillingham	2016–17	League One	45	7	2	0	3	0	2 (Note: Appearance(s) in the EFL Trophy)	0	52	7
Gillingham	2017–18	League One	42	2	3	0	1	0	4	1	50	3
Gillingham	2018–19	League One	40	1	4	1	1	0	1	0	46	2
Gillingham	2019–20	League One	35	1	4	0	1	0	0	0	40	1
Gillingham	Total		192	11	14	1	7	0	8	2	221	14
Bristol Rovers	2020–21	League One	28	1	3	1	1	0	1	0	33	2
Gillingham	2021–22	League One	45	0	2	0	2	0	2	0	51	0
Gillingham	2022–23	League Two	45	1	5	1	3	0	1	0	54	2
Gillingham	2023–24	League Two	39	0	2	0	2	0	2	0	45	0
Gillingham	2024–25	League Two	35	0	1	0	1	0	2	0	39	0
Gillingham	Total		164	1	10	1	8	0	7	0	189	2
Ebbsfleet United	2025–26	National League South	17	0	1	0	—		3 (Note: Two appearances in FA Trophy, one appearance in Kent Senior Cup)	0	21	0
Farnborough	2026–27	National League South	11	0	2	0	—		0	0	13	0
Career total			518	16	34	3	16	0	23	3	591	22
