= 2014–15 Gillingham F.C. season =

English football club season

Gillingham
2014–15 season
- Chairman: Paul Scally
- Manager: Peter Taylor (until 31 December); Justin Edinburgh (from 7 February)
- Stadium: Priestfield Stadium
- League One: 12th
- FA Cup: First round
- League Cup: Second round
- Football League Trophy: Southern Section Area Final
- Top goalscorer: League: Cody McDonald (16); All: Cody McDonald (18)
- Highest home attendance: 10,204 (vs. Newcastle United, 26 August)
- Lowest home attendance: 2,368 (vs. Bristol City, 6 January)
Home colours	Away colours	Third colours

The 2014–15 season is Gillingham's 122nd season in existence.

== Transfers ==
Players transferred in
Date	Pos.	Name	Previous club	Fee	Ref.
29 May 2014	DF	(Wales) Aaron Morris	(England) AFC Wimbledon	Free	
29 May 2014	GK	(England) Glenn Morris	(England) Aldershot Town	Free	
3 June 2014	MF	(England) Jermaine McGlashan	(England) Cheltenham Town	Free	
10 June 2014	MF	(England) Doug Loft	(England) Port Vale	Free	
17 June 2014	MF	(Wales) Josh Pritchard	(England) Fulham	Free	
30 June 2014	FW	(England) Ben Dickenson	(England) Brighton & Hove Albion	Undisclosed	
3 July 2014	DF	(Republic of Ireland) John Egan	(England) Sunderland	Free	
3 July 2014	FW	(England) Luke Norris	(England) Brentford	Undisclosed	
19 August 2014	DF	(Trinidad and Tobago) Gavin Hoyte	(England) Dagenham & Redbridge	Free	
11 December 2014	MF	(Scotland) Danny Galbraith	(Republic of Ireland) Limerick	Free	
Players transferred out
Date	Pos.	Name	To	Fee	Ref.
16 May 2014	GK	(England) Sam Baxter	(England) Bishop's Stortford	Free	
16 May 2014	FW	(Wales) Adam Birchall	(England) Bromley	Free	
16 May 2014	DF	(England) Gary Borrowdale	Released	Free	
16 May 2014	DF	(England) Stephen Butcher	(England) Maidstone United	Free	
16 May 2014	DF	(England) Joe Carter	Released	Free	
16 May 2014	FW	(England) Craig Fagan	Released	Free	
16 May 2014	MF	(England) Steven Gregory	Released	Free	
16 May 2014	GK	(England) George Howard	Released	Free	
16 May 2014	MF	(England) Charlie Lee	(England) Stevenage	Free	
16 May 2014	DF	(England) Sam Muggleton	(England) Barnet	Free	
16 May 2014	MF	(England) Myles Weston	(England) Southend United	Free	
20 May 2014	FW	(England) Adebayo Akinfenwa	(England) AFC Wimbledon	Free	
30 June 2014	MF	(England) Chris Whelpdale	(England) Stevenage	Free	
6 January 2015	FW	(England) Danny Kedwell	(England) Ebbsfleet United	Free	
15 January 2015	DF	(England) Adam Barrett	(England) Southend United	Free	
10 March 2015	MF	(Republic of the Congo) Amine Linganzi	Released	Free	
Players loaned in
Date from	Pos.	Name	From	Date to	Ref.
28 July 2014	DF	(England) Kortney Hause	(England) Wolverhampton Wanderers	4 January 2015	
15 August 2014	GK	(England) Stephen Bywater	(England) Millwall	3 January 2015	
24 October 2014	MF	(Wales) Michael Doughty	(England) Queens Park Rangers	24 January 2015	
14 November 2014	DF	(England) Adam Chicksen	(England) Brighton & Hove Albion	13 December 2014	
26 November 2014	DF	(Germany) Max Ehmer	(England) Queens Park Rangers	30 June 2015	
27 November 2014	DF	(England) Harry Lennon	(England) Charlton Athletic	2 January 2015	
8 January 2015	FW	(England) John Marquis	(England) Millwall	30 June 2015	
16 January 2015	DF	(Republic of Ireland) Bradley Garmston	(England) West Bromwich Albion	15 March 2015	
11 March 2015	MF	(England) Oliver Muldoon	(England) Charlton Athletic	30 June 2015	
20 March 2015	DF	(England) Amari'i Bell	(England) Birmingham City	30 June 2015	
Players loaned out
Date from	Pos.	Name	To	Date to	Ref.
7 August 2014	DF	(England) Adam Barrett	(England) AFC Wimbledon	4 January 2015	
30 October 2014	GK	(England) Tom Hadler	(England) Tonbridge Angels	29 November 2014	
21 November 2014	DF	(England) Matt Fish	(England) Portsmouth	3 January 2015	

== Match details ==
=== Pre-season ===
15 July 2014	Bromley	0–2	Gillingham	Bromley
19:30 BST		Report	Kedwell 70' (pen.); Dickenson 71'	Stadium: Hayes Lane

19 July 2014	Welling United	1–1	Gillingham	Welling
15:00 BST	Healy 60'	Report	German 9'	Stadium: Park View Road

22 July 2014	Dartford	0–4	Gillingham	Dartford
19:30 BST		Report	Linganzi 2'; Norris 14'; German 60'; Dickenson 90+1'	Stadium: Princes Park; Attendance: 924; Referee: Fred Graham

26 July 2014	Gillingham	0–2	Ipswich Town	Gillingham
15:00 BST		Report	Henshall 3'; Hyam 62'	Stadium: Priestfield Stadium; Attendance: 1,812; Referee: Andy D'Urso

29 July 2014	Dover Athletic	1–0	Gillingham	River
19:30 BST	Raggett 65'	Report		Stadium: Crabble Athletic Ground

2 August 2014	Ebbsfleet United	1–0	Gillingham	Northfleet
15:00 BST	Sheringham 85'	Report		Stadium: Stonebridge Road; Attendance: 1,007

=== League One ===
==== League table ====
Pos	Team	Pld	W	D	L	GF	GA	GD	Pts
10	Fleetwood Town	46	17	12	17	49	52	−3	63
11	Barnsley	46	17	11	18	62	61	+1	62
12	Gillingham	46	16	14	16	65	66	−1	62
13	Doncaster Rovers	46	16	13	17	58	62	−4	61
14	Walsall	46	14	17	15	50	54	−4	59

Updated to match(es) played on 3 May 2015. Source: BBC Sport
Rules for classification: 1) Points; 2) Goal difference; 3) Number of goals scored

==== Matches ====
The fixtures for the 2014–15 season were announced on 18 June 2014 at 9am.

9 August 2014 1	Milton Keynes Dons	4–2	Gillingham	Milton Keynes
15:00	Martin (yellow card) 29'; Kay (yellow card) 32'; Hause 44' (o.g.); Grigg 68'; McFadzean 70'; Legge 73' (o.g.)	Report	McDonald 7'; Kedwell 29' (pen.) (yellow card) 79'	Stadium: Stadium mk Attendance: 7,595 (1,048 Gills); Referee: Tim Robinson

16 August 2014 2	Gillingham	2–0	Yeovil Town	Gillingham
15:00	Martin 35'; Kedwell 55'	Report		Stadium: Priestfield Stadium; Attendance: 5,173; Referee: Lee Collins

19 August 2014 3	Gillingham	2–2	Swindon Town	Gillingham
19:45	Kedwell 9' (yellow card) 79'; Hause 51' (yellow card) 52'	Report	Williams 43'; Kasim (yellow card) 87'; Bywater 90' (o.g.)	Stadium: Priestfield Stadium; Attendance: 5,264; Referee: Charles Breakspear

23 August 2014 4	Barnsley	4–1	Gillingham	Barnsley
15:00	Hourihane 22'; Winnall 30'; Cole 68'; Jennings 76'; Cranie (yellow card) 78'	Report	Legge (yellow card) 66'; Kedwell 74'	Stadium: Oakwell; Attendance: 9,163 (288 Gills); Referee: Carl Berry

30 August 2014 5	Gillingham	2–0	Crewe Alexandra	Gillingham
15:00	Dack 18'; McDonald 45+1'	Report	Ray (yellow card) 72'	Stadium: Priestfield Stadium; Attendance: 4,998; Referee: Andrew Madley

5 September 2014 6	Coventry City	1–0	Gillingham	Coventry
20:00	Nouble 10'; Clarke (yellow card) 36'; Fleck (yellow card) 83'; Thomas (yellow card) 87'	Report	Martin (yellow card) 36'	Stadium: Ricoh Arena; Attendance: 27,306 (495 Gills); Referee: Keith Stroud

13 September 2014 7	Oldham Athletic	0–0	Gillingham	Oldham
15:00		Report		Stadium: Boundary Park; Attendance: 3,785; Referee: David Webb

16 September 2014 8	Gillingham	2–1	Peterborough United	Gillingham
19:45	McDonald 26', 86' (pen.); Hessenthaler (yellow card) 69'	Report	Payne (yellow card) 24'; Taylor 44'; Smith (yellow card) 75'; Ricardo Santos (yellow card) 76'; Burgess (yellow card) 85'	Stadium: Priestfield Stadium; Attendance: 4,819 (282 Posh); Referee: Mark Heywood

20 September 2014 9	Gillingham	0–0	Walsall	Gillingham
15:00		Report	Butler (yellow card) 66'	Stadium: Priestfield Stadium; Attendance: 5,344 (130 Walsall); Referee: James Adcock

27 September 2014 10	Sheffield United	2–1	Gillingham	Sheffield
15:00	Higdon 87'; Murphy 90+7'	Report	Linganzi (yellow card) 29'; Bywater (yellow card) 82'; Norris 83'; Loft (yellow card) 90+1'	Stadium: Bramall Lane; Attendance: 18,487 (340 Gills); Referee: Kevin Wright

4 October 2014 11	Notts County	1–0	Gillingham	Nottingham
15:00	Noble (yellow card) 32'; Harrad 35'; Carroll (yellow card) 81'	Report	Hessenthaler (yellow card) 32'; Dickenson (yellow card) 56'	Stadium: Meadow Lane; Attendance: 4,800; Referee: Graham Scott

11 October 2014 12	Gillingham	0–3	Scunthorpe United	Gillingham
15:00	Loft (red card) 34'; Norris (yellow card) 60'	Report	Madden 41'; Brisley (yellow card) 50'; Myrie-Williams (yellow card) 60'; Bishop 72'; Boyce (yellow card) 82'; McSheffrey 90+4'	Stadium: Priestfield Stadium; Attendance: 7,042 (162 Scunthorpe); Referee: Peter Bankes

18 October 2014 13	Rochdale	1–1	Gillingham	Rochdale
15:00	Vincenti 25'; Dawson (yellow card) 82'	Report	Dack (yellow card) 44'; McDonald 83'	Stadium: Spotland Stadium; Attendance: 2,574; Referee: Eddie Ilderton

21 October 2014 14	Gillingham	0–1	Preston North End	Gillingham
19:45	Egan (yellow card) 90'	Report	Gallagher 59'; Buchanan (yellow card) 71'	Stadium: Priestfield Stadium; Attendance: 4,632; Referee: James Linington

25 October 2014 15	Gillingham	1–1	Crawley Town	Gillingham
15:00	Martin (yellow card) 17'; Legge 44'	Report	Keane (yellow card) 24'; Edwards 29'	Stadium: Priestfield Stadium; Attendance: 4,850; Referee: Chris Kavanagh

1 November 2014 16	Fleetwood Town	1–0	Gillingham	Fleetwood
15:00	Hitchcock 3'	Report		Stadium: Highbury Stadium; Attendance: 2,951 (252 Gills); Referee: Tony Harrington

15 November 2014 17	Gillingham	3–2	Leyton Orient	Gillingham
15:00	Doughty (yellow card) 29' (yellow-red card) 76'; Legge 55', 74'; Loft (yellow card) 81'; McDonald 90+8' (yellow card) 90+8'	Report	Plasmati 48' (pen.); Pritchard (yellow card) 54'; Dagnall 90+4'	Stadium: Priestfield Stadium; Attendance: 5,891; Referee: Darren Deadman

22 November 2014 18	Bradford City	1–1	Gillingham	Bradford
15:00	Legge 56' (o.g.)	Report	Hessenthaler (yellow card) 22'; German 90+3'	Stadium: Valley Parade; Attendance: 12,434; Referee: Scott Duncan

29 November 2014 19	Gillingham	2–2	Port Vale	Gillingham
15:00	Egan 29', 55'; Loft (yellow card) 40'	Report	N'Guessan 18'; O'Connor (yellow card) 83'; Dickinson (yellow card) 87'; Brown 90+4'	Stadium: Priestfield Stadium; Attendance: 4,799; Referee: Brendan Malone

13 December 2014 20	Doncaster Rovers	1–2	Gillingham	Doncaster
15:00 GMT	Wabara (yellow card) 41'; Main 90+4' (pen.)	Report	Norris 51', 77'; Egan (yellow card) 69'; Dack (yellow card) 72'; Nelson (yellow card) 90+4'	Stadium: Keepmoat Stadium; Attendance: 5,542; Referee: Graham Salisbury

20 December 2014 21	Gillingham	2–3	Chesterfield	Gillingham
15:00 GMT	McDonald 59'; Egan 61'; Ehmer (yellow card) 70'	Report	Clucas 22'; Legge 54' (o.g.); Ryan 69'	Stadium: Priestfield Stadium; Attendance: 6,841; Referee: Chris Sarginson

26 December 2014 22	Colchester United	1–2	Gillingham	Colchester
15:00 GMT	Szmodics 51'	Report	Martin 25' (yellow card) 53'; Dack 34'; Norris (yellow card) 56'; Egan (yellow card) 89'	Stadium: Colchester Community Stadium; Attendance: 4,544; Referee: Graham Horwood

28 December 2014 23	Gillingham	1–3	Bristol City	Gillingham
15:00 GMT	McDonald 47'; Dickenson (yellow card) 58'; Doughty (yellow card) 79'; Martin (yellow card) 90'	Report	Smith 34', 44'; Cunningham (yellow card) 38'; Wagstaff 55'; Bryan (yellow card) 90+2'	Stadium: Priestfield Stadium; Attendance: 6,216; Referee: Lee Collins

3 January 2015 24	Port Vale	2–1	Gillingham	Burslem
15:00 GMT	Williamson 11'; Brown (yellow card) 62'; Daniel 90+3'	Report	McDonald 31'	Stadium: Vale Park; Attendance: 4,783; Referee: Fred Graham

10 January 2015 25	Crewe Alexandra	3–1	Gillingham	Crewe
15:00	Ajose 27' (pen.); Davis 32'; Ikpeazu 84'	Report	Legge (yellow card) 30'; Ehmer (yellow card) 34'; Dack 55'; McDonald (yellow card) 85'	Stadium: Gresty Road; Attendance: 4,436; Referee: Mark Brown

17 January 2015 26	Gillingham	3–1	Coventry City	Gillingham
15:00	Egan (yellow card) 40'; Ehmer (yellow card) 73'; Marquis 82'; McDonald 88' (pen.); McGlashan 90+4'	Report	Madine 35' (pen.); Haynes (yellow card) 87'	Stadium: Priestfield Stadium; Attendance: 5,141; Referee: James Linington

24 January 2015 27	Gillingham	3–2	Oldham Athletic	Gillingham
15:00	Marquis 7', 14'; Nelson (yellow card) 19'; Dack (yellow card) 45+2' (goal) 70'; Hessenthaler (yellow card) 58'	Report	Kelly 20'; Morgan-Smith (yellow card) 22'; Poleon 23'; Wilson (yellow card) 45+1'; Brown (yellow card) 90+4'	Stadium: Priestfield Stadium; Attendance: 4,959; Referee: Andy Woolmer

1 February 2015 28	Walsall	1–1	Gillingham	Walsall
18:00	Chambers (yellow card) 17'; Grimes 74'	Report	Hoyte (yellow card) 10'; Pritchard (yellow card) 41'; Dack 69'; McDonald (yellow card) 71'; Loft (yellow card) 74'; Ehmer (yellow card) 86'	Stadium: Bescot Stadium; Attendance: 3,951; Referee: Carl Berry

7 February 2015 29	Gillingham	2–0	Sheffield United	Gillingham
15:00	Marquis (yellow card) 34'; McGlashan 86'; McDonald 90+4'	Report		Stadium: Priestfield Stadium; Attendance: 5,704; Referee: Iain Williamson

10 February 2015 30	Peterborough United	1–2	Gillingham	Peterborough
19:45	Bostwick (yellow card) 36'; Payne 55'	Report	Egan (yellow card) 9'; Dack 30'; Marquis 79'	Stadium: London Road Stadium; Attendance: 4,449; Referee: James Adcock

14 February 2015 31	Gillingham	4–2	Milton Keynes Dons	Gillingham
15:00	McDonald 9' (yellow card) 84'; Marquis (yellow card) 33' (goal) 81'; Dack 38'; Loft (yellow card) 43'; Garmston 75'; Hessenthaler (yellow card) 87'	Report	Potter (yellow card) 17'; Cole 36'; Carruthers (yellow card) 52'; Reeves 67' (pen.); Kay (yellow card) 84'	Stadium: Priestfield Stadium; Attendance: 5,107; Referee: Keith Stroud

21 February 2015 32	Yeovil Town	2–2	Gillingham	Yeovil
15:00 GMT	Smith (yellow card) 9'; Ugwu 21'; Webster (yellow card) 83'; Morgan 90+4' (pen.) (yellow card) 90+4'	Report	Dack (yellow card) 23'; Marquis (yellow card) 45+1' (goal) 49'; Norris 87'; Nelson (yellow card) 90+3'	Stadium: Huish Park; Attendance: 4,293; Referee: Simon Hooper

28 February 2015 33	Gillingham	0–1	Barnsley	Gillingham
15:00 GMT	Loft (yellow card) 16'	Report	Pearson (yellow card) 45+1'; Waring 56'	Stadium: Priestfield Stadium; Attendance: 5,905; Referee: Kevin Johnson

3 March 2015 34	Swindon Town	0–3	Gillingham	Swindon
19:45	Turnbull (yellow card) 36'; Branco (yellow card) 59'; Foderingham (yellow card) 64'	Report	McDonald 29', 88'; Loft (yellow card) 41'; Hessenthaler 46'; Pritchard (yellow card) 48'; Egan (yellow card) 61'; Dack (yellow card) 64'	Stadium: County Ground; Attendance: 7,025; Referee: Tim Robinson

7 March 2015 35	Gillingham	1–1	Doncaster Rovers	Gillingham
15:00	Marquis 44'; Martin (yellow card) 66'; Norris (yellow card) 84'	Report	Forrester 40'	Stadium: Priestfield Stadium; Attendance: 5,909; Referee: Keith Hill

14 March 2015 36	Bristol City	0–0	Gillingham	Bristol
15:00	Freeman (yellow card) 90+2'	Report	Martin (yellow card) 90+2'	Stadium: Ashton Gate; Attendance: 11,601; Referee: David Webb

17 March 2015 37	Chesterfield	3–0	Gillingham	Chesterfield
19:45	Clucas 3', 88'; O'Shea 12'; Darikwa (yellow card) 52'	Report	Dack (yellow card) 39'; Hessenthaler (yellow card) 60'	Stadium: Proact Stadium; Attendance: 4,804; Referee: Gary Sutton

21 March 2015 38	Gillingham	2–2	Colchester United	Gillingham
15:00	Ehmer 82'; Loft 90+6'	Report	Gilbey (yellow card) 49'; Moncur 62'; Briggs (yellow card) 81' (yellow-red card) 90+4'; Porter 87'; Massey (yellow card) 90'	Stadium: Priestfield Stadium; Attendance: 5,319; Referee: Darren Sheldrake

28 March 2015 39	Crawley Town	1–2	Gillingham	Crawley
15:00	Wordsworth (yellow card) 61'; McLeod 63' (yellow card) 68'	Report	Dack 40' (yellow card) 68'; Morris (yellow card) 68'; McGlashan 81'	Stadium: Broadfield Stadium; Attendance: 3,570; Referee: Trevor Kettle

3 April 2015 40	Gillingham	0–1	Fleetwood Town	Gillingham
15:00		Report	Evans 18'; Roberts (yellow card) 63'; Murdoch (yellow card) 85'	Stadium: Priestfield Stadium; Attendance: 7,961; Referee: Brendan Malone

6 April 2015 41	Leyton Orient	3–3	Gillingham	Leyton
15:00	James 31' (pen.); Baudry (yellow card) 65'; Henderson 67'; Wright 85'	Report	McGlashan (yellow card) 34' (goal) 35'; McDonald 43', 56' (pen.)	Stadium: Brisbane Road; Attendance: 6,634; Referee: Mark Haywood

11 April 2015 42	Gillingham	1–0	Bradford City	Gillingham
15:00	Legge (yellow card) 19'; Marquis 72'	Report	Hanson (yellow card) 23'	Stadium: Priestfield Stadium; Attendance: 5,221; Referee: Paul Tierney

14 April 2015 43	Preston North End	2–2	Gillingham	Preston
19:45	Welsh (yellow card) 36'; Beckford 36'; Robinson 45+2'; Garner (yellow card) 84'	Report	McGlashan 58'; Ehmer (yellow card) 84'; Dickenson (yellow card) 88'; Legge 90+1'	Stadium: Deepdale; Attendance: 9,417; Referee: David Coote

18 April 2015 44	Gillingham	1–0	Rochdale	Gillingham
15:00	Dack 14'; McDonald (yellow card) 38'; Loft (yellow card) 53'; McGlashan (yellow card) 67'	Report	Jones (red card) 63'; Lund (red card) 70'	Stadium: Priestfield Stadium; Attendance: 5,430; Referee: Andy D'Urso

25 April 2015 45	Scunthorpe United	2–1	Gillingham	Scunthorpe
15:00	Abelakun 11'; McSheffrey 19'; Canavan (yellow card) 75'; Clarke (yellow card) 83'	Report	Norris 2'; Dack (yellow card) 74'; Loft (yellow card) 87'	Stadium: Glanford Park; Attendance: 3,763; Referee: Andy Haines

3 May 2015 46	Gillingham	3–1	Notts County	Gillingham
12:15	Egan 88' (yellow card) 89'; Dickenson 90+3'; Norris 90+5'	Report	Adams (yellow card) 50'; Burke 61' (yellow card) 61'; McCourt (yellow card) 90+2'	Stadium: Priestfield Stadium; Attendance: 8,443; Referee: Stuart Attwell

=== FA Cup ===
The draw for the first round of the FA Cup was made on 27 October 2014.

8 November 2014 First round	Gillingham	1–2	Bristol City	Gillingham
15:00	Kedwell 81' (pen.)	Report	Cunningham 40'; Emmanuel-Thomas 77'	Stadium: Priestfield Stadium; Attendance: 2,654; Referee: Pat Miller

=== League Cup ===
The draw for the first round was made on 17 June 2014 at 10am. Gillingham were drawn away to Yeovil Town.

12 August 2014 Round One	Yeovil Town	1–2	Gillingham	Yeovil
19:45	Gillett 56'; Ofori-Twumasi (red card) 62'	Report	Dickenson 23'; Morris 59'	Stadium: Huish Park; Attendance: 2,283; Referee: Darren Sheldrake

26 August 2014 Round Two	Gillingham	0–1	Newcastle United	Gillingham
19:45		Report	Egan 25' (o.g.)	Stadium: Priestfield Stadium; Attendance: 10,204; Referee: Oliver Langford

=== Football League Trophy ===
2 September 2014 Round One	Stevenage	0–1	Gillingham	Stevenage
19:45	Day (yellow card); Henry (yellow card)	Report	Norris 17' (pen.); Hoyte (red card) 64'; Dack (yellow card)	Stadium: Broadhall Way; Attendance: 1,613; Referee: Darren Deadman

7 October 2014 Round Two	Colchester United	3–3 (2–4 p)	Gillingham	Colchester
19:45	Wright 17'; Watt 38' (pen.) (yellow card) 45'; Eastmond (yellow card) 73'; Sears 87'	Report	Dickenson 24'; Dack 55'; German 74'	Stadium: Colchester Community Stadium; Attendance: 1,401; Referee: Michael Bull
	Penalties
	Sears (penalty scored); Moncur (penalty missed); Eastman (penalty missed); Clohessy (penalty scored)		Dack (penalty scored); Fish (penalty scored); Hess (penalty scored); Nelson (penalty scored)

11 November 2014 Q-Final	Crawley Town	1–2	Gillingham	Crawley
19:45	McLeod 21' (pen.) (yellow card) 65'; Edwards (yellow card) 29'; Walsh (yellow card) 51'; Tomlin (yellow card) 58'	Report	Martin (red card) 64'; McGlashan 68'; Dickenson (yellow card) 78'; Loft 87'	Stadium: Broadfield Stadium; Attendance: 1,305; Referee: Darren Sheldrake

6 December 2014 S-Final	Gillingham	1–0	Leyton Orient	Gillingham
15:00	Legge (yellow card) 19'; Egan 79'	Report	Lowry (yellow card) 74'; McAnuff (yellow card) 77'; Batt (yellow card) 88'	Stadium: Priestfield Stadium; Attendance: 3,103; Referee: Trevor Kettle

6 January 2015 Area Final L1	Gillingham	2–4	Bristol City	Gillingham
19:45	McDonald 6', 70'; Hessenthaler (yellow card) 29'; Martin (yellow card) 34'; Hoyte (yellow card) 87'	Report	Smith 18', 27', 50', 77'	Stadium: Priestfield Stadium; Attendance: 2,368; Referee: Andy D'Urso

29 January 2015 Area Final L2	Bristol City	1–1 (5–3 agg.)	Gillingham	Bristol
19:45	M. Smith 17'; Freeman (yellow card) 43'; Ayling (yellow card) 53'	Report	McGlashan 31'; Hoyte (yellow card) 69'; Egan (yellow card) 79'	Stadium: Ashton Gate; Attendance: 8,469; Referee: Graham Scott
