= 2013–14 Gillingham F.C. season =

English football club season

Gillingham
2013–14 season
- Chairman: Paul Scally
- Manager: Martin Allen
- Stadium: Priestfield Stadium
- Football League One: 17th
- FA Cup: First round
- League Cup: First round
- Football League Trophy: First round
- Top goalscorer: League: Cody McDonald (17); All: Cody McDonald (17)
Home colours	Away colours	Third colours

The 2013–14 season was Gillingham's 121st season in their existence. Along with League One, the club competed in the FA Cup, League Cup, Football League Trophy and the regional Kent Senior Cup. The season covers the period from 1 July 2013 to 30 June 2015.

== Transfers ==
=== Transfers in ===
Date	Pos.	Player	Transferred from†	Fee	Ref.
10 June 2013	MF	Amine Linganzi	(Accrington Stanley)	Free transfer	
27 June 2013	FW	Antonio German	Brentford	Undisclosed	
2 July 2013	FW	Adebayo Akinfenwa	(Northampton Town)	Free transfer	
12 November 2013	FW	Craig Fagan		Free transfer	
30 January 2014	DF	Gary Borrowdale		Free transfer	

† Brackets around club names denote the player's contract with that club had expired before he joined Gillingham.

=== Loans in ===
Date from	Pos.	Player	Loaned from	Duration	Ref.
5 August 2013	DF	Michael Harriman	Queens Park Rangers	Until end of season	
29 August 2013	MF	Danny Hollands	Charlton Athletic	Three months	
7 November 2013	MF	John Mousinho	Preston North End	Two months	
13 November 2013	DF	Elliott Hewitt	Ipswich Town	Until 2 December 2013	
26 November 2013	DF	Donervon Daniels	West Bromwich Albion	Until 3 January 2014	
3 January 2014	FW	Jack Marriott	Ipswich Town	Until end of season	
3 January 2014	DF	Elliott Hewitt	Ipswich Town	One month	
8 January 2014	MF	Connor Smith	Watford	Until end of season	
30 January 2014	FW	Joe Pigott	Charlton Athletic	One month	

=== Transfers out ===
Date	Pos.	Player	Transferred to†	Fee	Ref.
30 June 2013	MF	Jack Payne	Peterborough United	Undisclosed	
14 February 2014	MF	Charlie Allen		Contract terminated	

† Brackets around club names denote the player joined that club after his Gillingham contract expired.

=== Loans out ===
Date from	Pos.	Player	Loaned to	Duration	Ref.
30 July 2013	FW	Adam Birchall	Dartford		
31 October 2013	MF	Charlie Allen	Tamworth		
2 January 2014	FW	Antonio German	Northampton Town	One month	

== Pre-season and friendlies ==
29 June 2013	Faversham Town	2–4	Gillingham	Faversham
13:00 BST	Wilson 11'; Rowland 74'	Report	Millbank 15'; Dack 23'; Birchall 66', 76'	Stadium: Shepherd Neame Stadium; Attendance: 650

29 June 2013	Ashford United	1–2	Gillingham	Kingsnorth, Ashford
15:00 BST	Whiting 30'	Report	Blanchard 3'; Legge 40'	Stadium: Homelands Stadium; Attendance: 433

6 July 2013	Bromley	0–3	Gillingham	Bromley
15:00 BST		Report	Dack 28'; Barrett 35'; Kedwell 39' (pen.)	Stadium: Hayes Lane

16 July 2013	Gillingham	1–2	Ipswich Town	Gillingham
19:30 BST	McDonald 46'	Report	McGoldrick 22'; October 90'	Stadium: Priestfield Stadium

20 July 2013	Gillingham	1–3	Millwall	Gillingham
12:30 BST	Akinfenwa 77'	Report	Morison 7', 18'; Keogh 28'	Stadium: Priestfield Stadium; Referee: Mike Bull

23 July 2013	Gillingham	0–3	Crystal Palace	Gillingham
19:30 BST		Report	Moxey 21'; Dobbie 68'; Owusu-Abeyie 73'	Stadium: Priestfield Stadium; Referee: Gavin Ward

25 July 2013	A.F.C. Sudbury	3–2	Gillingham	Sudbury
19:45 BST				Stadium: King's Marsh Stadium

26 July 2013	Gillingham	1–1	New York Cosmos	Gillingham
	Birchall 90'	Report	Dimitrov 20'	Stadium: Priestfield Stadium

27 July 2013	Woking	3–0	Gillingham	Gillingham
15:00 BST	McCallum 35'; Williams 50' (pen.); McNamee 90'	Report		Stadium: Priestfield Stadium; Attendance: 654

30 July 2013	Maidenhead United	4–2	Gillingham	Maidenhead
19:30 BST	Pacquette; Pritchard; Ruby; Hippolyte	Report	McKain; Haysman	Stadium: York Road

== Competitions ==
=== Overall ===
Competition	Started round	Final position / round	First match	Last match
Football League One	—	17th	10 August 2013	3 May 2014
League Cup	1st round	1st round	6 August 2013	6 August 2013
FA Cup	1st round	1st round	9 November 2013	9 November 2013

Source: Competitions

==== League table ====
Pos	Team	Pld	W	D	L	GF	GA	GD	Pts
15	Oldham Athletic	46	14	14	18	50	59	−9	56
16	Colchester United	46	13	14	19	53	61	−8	53
17	Gillingham	46	15	8	23	60	79	−19	53
18	Coventry City	46	16	13	17	74	77	−3	51 (Note: On 2 August Coventry City were deducted 10 points for exiting administration without a CVA.)
19	Crewe Alexandra	46	13	12	21	54	80	−26	51

Updated to match(es) played on 3 May 2014. Source: BBC Sport
Rules for classification: 1) Points; 2) Goal difference; 3) Number of goals scored

==== Results ====
3 August 2013 1	Gillingham	0–1	Colchester United	Gillingham
15:00 BST		Report	Bond 89'	Stadium: Priestfield Stadium; Attendance: 6,792; Referee: Keith Hill

10 August 2013 2	Wolverhampton Wanderers	4–0	Gillingham	Wolverhampton
15:00 BST	Griffiths 5', 68' (pen.); Evans 26'; Sako 31'	Report		Stadium: Molineux; Attendance: 19,102; Referee: Stuart Attwell

17 August 2013 3	Gillingham	1–1	Brentford	Gillingham
15:00 BST	Akinfenwa 40'	Report	El Alagui 90+4'	Stadium: Priestfield Stadium; Attendance: 6,225; Referee: Gavin Ward

24 August 2013 4	Swindon Town	2–2	Gillingham	Swindon
15:00 BST	Byrne 12'; N. Thompson 68'	Report	Kedwell 18'; McDonald 85'	Stadium: County Ground; Attendance: 7,520; Referee: Iain Williamson

31 August 2013 5	Gillingham	1–1	Bristol City	Gillingham
15:00 BST	Akinfenwa 22'	Report	Elliott 45'	Stadium: Priestfield Stadium; Attendance: 5,616; Referee: Mike Russell

7 September 2013 6	Crawley Town	3–2	Gillingham	Crawley
15:00 BST	McFadzean 55'; Clarke 66', 81'	Report	Kedwell 47' (pen.); Legge 69'	Stadium: Broadfield Stadium; Attendance: 3,984; Referee: Steven Rushton

15 September 2013 7	Coventry City	2–1	Gillingham	Northampton
15:00 BST	L. Clarke 2'; Moussa 83'; Adams (yellow card) 51'	Report	McDonald 10'; Nelson (yellow card) 74'; Barrett (yellow card) 90'	Stadium: Sixfields Stadium; Attendance: 2,046; Referee: Trevor Kettle

21 September 2013 8	Gillingham	0–1	Bradford City	Gillingham
15:00 BST		Report	Jones 9'	Stadium: Priestfield Stadium; Attendance: 4,965; Referee: Lee Collins

28 September 2013 9	Crewe Alexandra	0–3	Gillingham	Crewe
15:00 BST		Report	McDonald 39'; Martin 50'; Barrett 70'	Stadium: Gresty Road; Attendance: 4,254; Referee: Oliver Langford

5 October 2013 10	Gillingham	3–2	Milton Keynes Dons	Gillingham
15:00 BST	Kedwell 11' (pen.), 13' (pen.); Hollands 59'	Report	Bamford 26', 30'	Stadium: Priestfield Stadium; Attendance: 5,410; Referee: James Linington

12 October 2013 11	Shrewsbury Town	2–0	Gillingham	Shrewsbury
15:00 BST	Jacobson 17'; McAlinden 81'	Report		Stadium: New Meadow; Attendance: 5,129; Referee: Graham Salisbury

19 October 2013 12	Gillingham	1–2	Preston North End	Gillingham
15:00 BST	Kedwell 76'	Report	47' Keane; 53' Brownhill	Stadium: Priestfield Stadium; Attendance: 7,054; Referee: Graham Horwood

22 October 2013 13	Gillingham	2–1	Notts County	Gillingham
19:45 BST	Whelpdale 24'; Kedwell 29'	Report	79' McGregor	Stadium: Priestfield Stadium; Attendance: 5,161; Referee: David Phillips

26 October 2013 14	Port Vale	2–1	Gillingham	Burslem, Stoke-on-Trent
15:00 BST	Robertson 47'; Pope 63'	Report	Kedwell 13'	Stadium: Vale Park; Attendance: 5,690; Referee: Darren Bond

2 November 2013 15	Gillingham	1–0	Carlisle United	Gillingham
15:00 GMT	Kedwell 63' (pen.)	Report		Stadium: Priestfield Stadium; Attendance: 5,697; Referee: Charles Breakspear

16 November 2013 16	Sheffield United	1–2	Gillingham	Sheffield
15:00 GMT	Porter 19'	Report	Kedwell 7'; McDonald 47'	Stadium: Bramall Lane; Attendance: 16,560; Referee: Geoff Eltringham

23 November 2013 17	Gillingham	0–1	Oldham Athletic	Gillingham
15:00 GMT		Report	Petrasso 57'	Stadium: Priestfield Stadium; Attendance: 6,025; Referee: Graham Scott

26 November 2013 18	Gillingham	3–2	Stevenage	Gillingham
19:45 GMT	Kedwell 47' (pen.); Daniels 52'; Mousinho 79'	Report	Heslop 37'; Zoko 59'	Stadium: Priestfield Stadium; Attendance: 4,951; Referee: Brendan Malone

30 November 2013 19	Rotherham United	4–1	Gillingham	Rotherham
15:00 GMT	Dicko 9'; Agard 23'; Pringle 35'; Tavernier 76'	Report	McDonald 66'	Stadium: New York Stadium; Attendance: 7,152

7 December 2013 20	Notts County	3–1	Gillingham	Nottingham
15:00 GMT	McGregor 40', 53'; Grealish 87'	Report	47' Dack	Stadium: Meadow Lane; Attendance: 3,607; Referee: Jeremy Simpson

14 December 2013 21	Gillingham	2–2	Peterborough United	Gillingham
15:00 GMT	Martin 51'; McDonald 70'	Report	12', 90+7' Assombalonga	Stadium: Priestfield Stadium; Attendance: 6,949; Referee: Tim Robinson

20 December 2013 22	Tranmere Rovers	1–2	Gillingham	Birkenhead
19:45 GMT	McNulty (red card) 56'; Lowe 77'; Robinson (yellow card) 81'	Report	Dack (yellow card) 34'; Akinfenwa 45', 69'; Nelson (yellow card) 77'	Stadium: Prenton Park; Attendance: 6,251; Referee: Robert Lewis

26 December 2013 23	Gillingham	1–2	Leyton Orient	Gillingham
13:30 GMT	Akinfenwa 4'	Report	Bartley 70'; Lasimant 90'	Stadium: Priestfield Stadium; Attendance: 8,613; Referee: Fred Graham

29 December 2013 24	Gillingham	2–2	Walsall	Gillingham
15:00 GMT	McDonald 46', 90+2'	Report	Sawyers 62'; Gray 90'	Stadium: Priestfield Stadium; Attendance: 5,394; Referee: Trevor Kettle

3 January 2014 25	Gillingham	1–0	Wolverhampton Wanderers	Gillingham
19:45 GMT	McDonald 90+2'	Report		Stadium: Priestfield Stadium; Attendance: 7,758; Referee: Mark Brown

11 January 2014 26	Colchester United	3–0	Gillingham	Colchester
15:00 GMT	Watt 50'; Morrison 87'; Sears 90+5'	Report		Stadium: Colchester Community Stadium; Attendance: 3,819; Referee: Darren Drysdale

18 January 2014 27	Gillingham	2–0	Swindon Town	Gillingham
15:00 GMT	Legge 18'; Harriman 83'	Report		Stadium: Priestfield Stadium; Attendance: 6,134; Referee: Andrew Madley

24 January 2014 28	Brentford	2–1	Gillingham	Brentford, London
15:00 GMT	Douglas 22'; Trotta 70' (pen.)	Report	McDonald 73'	Stadium: Griffin Park; Attendance: 7,713; Referee: Keith Stroud

1 February 2014 29	Gillingham	3–2	Port Vale	Gillingham
15:00 GMT	Akinfenwa 42', 61'; McDonald 64'	Report	Robertson 81'; Hugill 87'	Stadium: Priestfield Stadium; Attendance: 6,356; Referee: Darren Deadman

4 February 2014 30	Stevenage	3–1	Gillingham	Stevenage
19:45 GMT	Zoko 22' (pen.); Charles 30', 59'	Report	Hewitt (red card) 22'; McDonald 56'	Stadium: Broadhall Way; Attendance: 2,399; Referee: Stuart Attwell

8 February 2014 31	Carlisle United	1–2	Gillingham	Carlisle
15:00 GMT	Legge 90' (o.g.)	Report	Pigott 44'; McDonald 88'	Stadium: Brunton Park; Attendance: 3,584; Referee: Mark Heywood

19 February 2014 32	Gillingham	0–1	Sheffield United	Gillingham
19:45 GMT		Report	Coady 41'	Stadium: Priestfield Stadium; Attendance: 5,766; Referee: Carl Berry

22 February 2014 33	Oldham Athletic	1–0	Gillingham	Oldham
15:00 GMT	Harkins 33'	Report		Stadium: Boundary Park; Attendance: 3,714; Referee: Mike Russell

1 March 2014 34	Bristol City	2–1	Gillingham	Bristol
15:00 GMT	Baldock 27'; Gillett 83'	Report	Lee 65'	Stadium: Ashton Gate Stadium; Attendance: 11,422; Referee: Gary Sutton

8 March 2014 35	Gillingham	1–0	Crawley Town	Gillingham
15:00 GMT	Lee 88'	Report		Stadium: Priestfield Stadium; Attendance: 5,961; Referee: Dean Whitestone

11 March 2014 36	Gillingham	4–2	Coventry City	Gillingham
19:45 GMT	Akinfenwa 25' (pen.), 75' (pen.), (yellow card) 9'; Weston 56'; Hessenthaler 90'; Legge (yellow card) 83'; Fagan (yellow card) 89'	report	Wilson 50' (pen.), (yellow card) 73'; Baker 83' (pen.); Seaborne (red card) 24'; Adams (yellow card) 32'; Moussa (yellow card) 59'; Webster (yellow card) 90+2'	Stadium: Priestfield Stadium; Attendance: 5,447; Referee: Darren Sheldrake

15 March 2014 37	Bradford City	1–1	Gillingham	Bradford
15:00 GMT	McLean 10'	Report	McDonald 56'	Stadium: Valley Parade; Attendance: 13,089; Referee: Michael Bull

22 March 2014 38	Gillingham	1–3	Crewe Alexandra	Gillingham
15:00 GMT	Linganzi 30'	Report	Aneke 5', 53'; Pogba 83'; Grant (yellow card) 88' (yellow-red card) 90'	Stadium: Priestfield Stadium; Attendance: 5,767; Referee: Steve Bratt

25 March 2014 39	Milton Keynes Dons	0–1	Gillingham	Milton Keynes
19:45 GMT		Report	Fagan 50'	Stadium: Stadium MK; Attendance: 6,760; Referee: Carl Berry

5 April 2014 40	Gillingham	3–4	Rotherham United	Gillingham
15:00 BST	Akinfenwa 30'; Weston 57'; Dack 84'	Report	Agard 2'; Hitchcock 69', 86', 90+3'	Stadium: Priestfield Stadium; Attendance: 6,027; Referee: Steven Rushton

8 April 2014 41	Peterborough United	2–0	Gillingham	Peterborough
19:45 BST	Assombalonga 42'; Rowe 58'	Report		Stadium: London Road; Attendance: 6,543; Referee: Chris Sarginson

12 April 2014 42	Leyton Orient	5–1	Gillingham	Leyton, London
15:07 BST	Mooney 5', 35'; Cox 9' lisbie 35'; Dagnall 78'	Report	Fagan 82'	Stadium: Brisbane Road; Attendance: 5,128; Referee: Carl Boyeson

18 April 2014 43	Gillingham	2–0	Tranmere Rovers	Gillingham
15:00 BST	Dack 78'; McDonald 90+3'	Report		Stadium: Priestfield Stadium; Attendance: 7,343; Referee: Michael Naylor

21 April 2014 44	Walsall	1–1	Gillingham	Walsall
15:00 BST	Brandy 55'	Report	McDonald 84'	Stadium: Bescot Stadium; Attendance: 3,890; Referee: Darren Sheldrake

26 April 2014 45	Preston North End	3–1	Gillingham	Preston
15:00 BST	Welsh 8'; Gallagher 57'; Kilkenny 63'	Report	45' McDonald	Stadium: Deepdale; Attendance: 11,591; Referee: Charles Breakspear

3 May 2014 46	Gillingham	1–1	Shrewsbury Town	Gillingham
15:00 BST	Barrett 72'	Report	Miller 86'	Stadium: Priestfield Stadium; Attendance: 7,634; Referee: Darren Drysdale

=== FA Cup ===
9 November 2013 First round	Gillingham	1–1	Brackley Town	Gillingham
15:00 GMT	Dack 90+7'	Report	Martin 69' (o.g.)	Stadium: Priestfield Stadium; Attendance: 3,004; Referee: Lee Collins

18 November 2013 First round Replay	Brackley Town	1–0	Gillingham	Brackley
19:45 GMT	Walker 21'	Report		Stadium: St James Park; Attendance: 1,772; Referee: Lee Collins

=== Football League Cup ===
6 August 2013 First round	Gillingham	0–2	Bristol City	Gillingham
19:45 BST		Report	Baldock 21'; Wynter 66'	Stadium: Priestfield Stadium; Attendance: 2,585; Referee: Darren Deadman

=== Football League Trophy ===
3 September 2013 First round	Gillingham	1–3	Leyton Orient	Gillingham
19:00 BST	Dack 68'	Report	Batt 26' (pen.), 45', 59'	Stadium: Priestfield Stadium; Attendance: 1,630; Referee: Michael Bull
