= Devante McKain =

English footballer

Personal information
- Full name: Devante McKain
- Date of birth: 26 June 1994 (age 32)
- Place of birth: Hammersmith, England
- Height: 1.86 m (6 ft 1 in)
- Position: Defender

Team information
- Current team: Rayleigh F.C.
- Number: 22

Youth career
- 2001–2008: Fulham
- 2008–2011: Maidenhead United

Senior career*
Years	Team	Apps	(Gls)
2011–2012	Maidenhead United	21	(5)
2012–2015	Gillingham	2	(0)
2013	→ Maidenhead United (loan)	10	(1)
2013–2014	→ Maidenhead United (loan)	9	(0)
2014	→ Bromley (loan)	6	(0)
2015–2016	Hayes & Yeading United	25	(2)
2016–	Bedford Town	15	(0)
- * Club domestic league appearances and goals

Devante McKain (born 26 June 1994) is an English footballer who plays for Bedford Town as a defender.

== Club career ==
McKain began his youth career at Fulham before eventually moving to Maidenhead United. In November 2012, McKain signed with Gillingham for an undisclosed fee. At the time, then Gillingham boss Martin Allen said, "Devante was recommended to me by Maidenhead United manager Johnson Hippolyte, the same man that recommended DJ Campbell to me." Allen also said of McKain "He is big. He is strong. He is quick. He heads it. He needs to improve technically but he has got priceless attributes for a young centre-back." Also at the time, Maidenhead United manager Johnson Hippolyte said of McKain, "from day one we were all adamant he would play professional football. It was a no brainer, that's how much ability he has."

McKain made his Football League One debut for Gillingham on 27 April 2013 at Burton Albion. On 7 September 2013, he made his second Gillingham appearance against Crawley Town.

In October 2013, Martin Allen said, "Devante was close to playing in our team a couple of weeks ago. He has been fantastic in training."

In May 2014, McKain signed a new one-year deal to stay at Gillingham.

In March 2015, Devante was released by Gillingham along with several others
