= Joe Healy =

English footballer

Personal information
- Date of birth: 26 December 1986 (age 39)
- Place of birth: Sidcup, England
- Position: Midfielder

Youth career
- Millwall

Senior career*
Years	Team	Apps	(Gls)
2003–2006	Millwall	3	(0)
2004–2005	→ Crawley Town (loan)	4	(0)
2005–2006	→ Walton & Hersham (loan)	5	(2)
2006	Fisher Athletic		
2007	Yeading	9	(3)
2007	Beckenham Town		
2008	Welling United	11	(1)
2008	Beckenham Town		
2008–2009	Margate	48	(5)
2009–2015	Welling United	171	(29)
2015–2016	Maidstone United	40	(9)
2016–2017	Dover Athletic	19	(4)
2017–2018	Welling United	38	(9)
2018	Beckenham Town		
2019	Dartford	4	(0)
2019	Tonbridge Angels	0	(0)
- * Club domestic league appearances and goals

Joseph Healy (born 26 December 1986) is an English former footballer who played as a midfielder. He has previously played in the Football League for Millwall.
