= Gavin Hoyte =

Trinidad and Tobago footballer

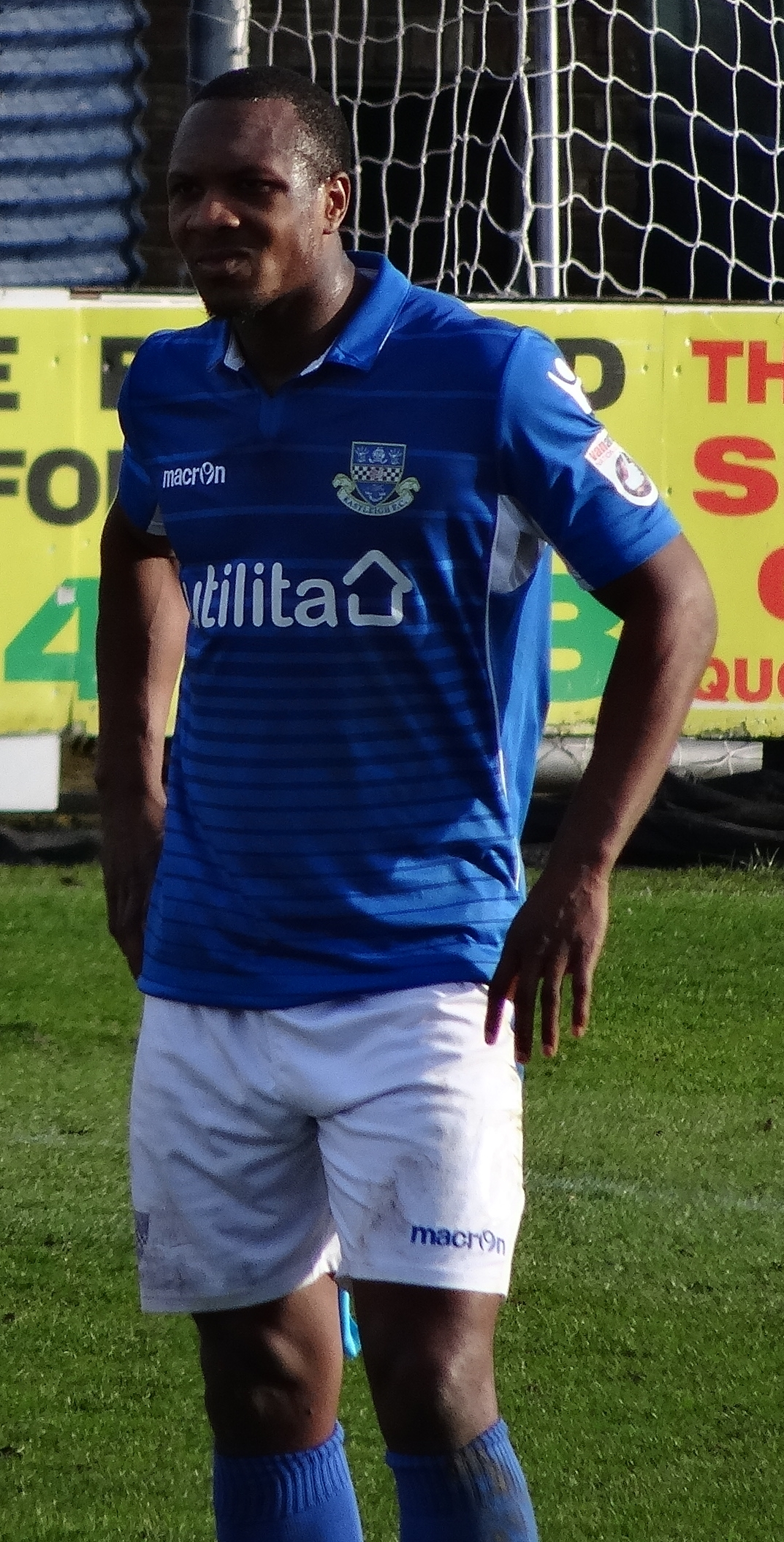
- Hoyte playing for Eastleigh in 2017

Personal information
- Full name: Gavin Andrew Hoyte
- Date of birth: 6 June 1990 (age 36)
- Place of birth: Leytonstone, England
- Height: 1.80 m (5 ft 11 in)
- Position: Defender

Team information
- Current team: Sittingbourne

Youth career
- 1999–2007: Arsenal

Senior career*
Years	Team	Apps	(Gls)
2007–2012	Arsenal	1	(0)
2008–2009	→ Watford (loan)	7	(0)
2009–2010	→ Brighton & Hove Albion (loan)	18	(0)
2010–2011	→ Lincoln City (loan)	12	(0)
2012	→ AFC Wimbledon (loan)	3	(0)
2012–2014	Dagenham & Redbridge	68	(0)
2014–2015	Gillingham	30	(0)
2015–2016	Barnet	21	(1)
2016–2018	Eastleigh	45	(1)
2018–2019	Dagenham & Redbridge	15	(0)
2019–2024	Maidstone United	124	(3)
2024–2025	Folkestone Invicta	42	(0)
2025–	Sittingbourne	0	(0)

International career^{‡}
2007	England U17	2	(0)
2007–2008	England U18	2	(0)
2008–2009	England U19	12	(0)
2009	England U20	1	(0)
2014–2015	Trinidad and Tobago	3	(0)
- * Club domestic league appearances and goals as of 19:30, 4 May 2025 (UTC) ‡ National team caps and goals as of 11:39, 25 March 2016 (UTC)

Gavin Andrew Hoyte (born 6 June 1990) is a professional footballer who plays as a defender for Isthmian League South East Division club Sittingbourne. Born in England, he has represented the Trinidad and Tobago national team.

== Career ==
=== Arsenal ===
==== Early career ====
Born in Leytonstone, London, Hoyte signed with Arsenal when he was nine. He featured regularly for Arsenal's U18 and Reserve teams, and was captain of Arsenal's U18 team during 2006–07. He signed as a professional with the club on 10 September 2007.

From 2007 onwards, Hoyte featured for Arsenal on the bench as an unused substitute several times; the first in an FA Cup fifth round replay against Blackburn Rovers on 28 February 2007. He then featured in four of Arsenal's five games in the 2007–08 League Cup campaign, against Newcastle United, but was always an unused substitute.

==== 2008–09 season ====
Hoyte played two first-team matches in Arsenal's 2008 pre-season friendly campaign, and was named captain of the Arsenal Reserves side for the 2008–09 season. He made his first-team competitive debut for Arsenal in a League Cup tie against Sheffield United on 23 September 2008, playing at right back for the full 90 minutes, in a match that Arsenal won 6–0. He started in subsequent rounds in the competition against Wigan Athletic and Burnley and also made his Premier League debut against Manchester City on 22 November 2008, in which he was substituted for Aaron Ramsey after 60 minutes.

In December 2008 Hoyte signed a new long-term contract with Arsenal. On 31 December 2008 Hoyte joined Championship side Watford on loan for the rest of the 2008–09 season.

==== 2009–10 season ====
In October 2009, Hoyte signed on a one-month loan for Brighton & Hove Albion as cover for the injured Andy Whing. Hoyte's loan spell at Brighton was extended until January 2010, and again on 12 January until the end of the 2009–10 season.

==== 2011–12 season ====
In late January 2012, Hoyte signed for League Two club AFC Wimbledon on a one-month loan deal.

In April 2012, Hoyte appeared as a trialist for League One club Stevenage, playing for their reserve team in a 6–1 loss to Southend United. On 22 May 2012 it was announced he would become a free agent on 1 July, and he would be released by Arsenal.

=== Dagenham & Redbridge ===
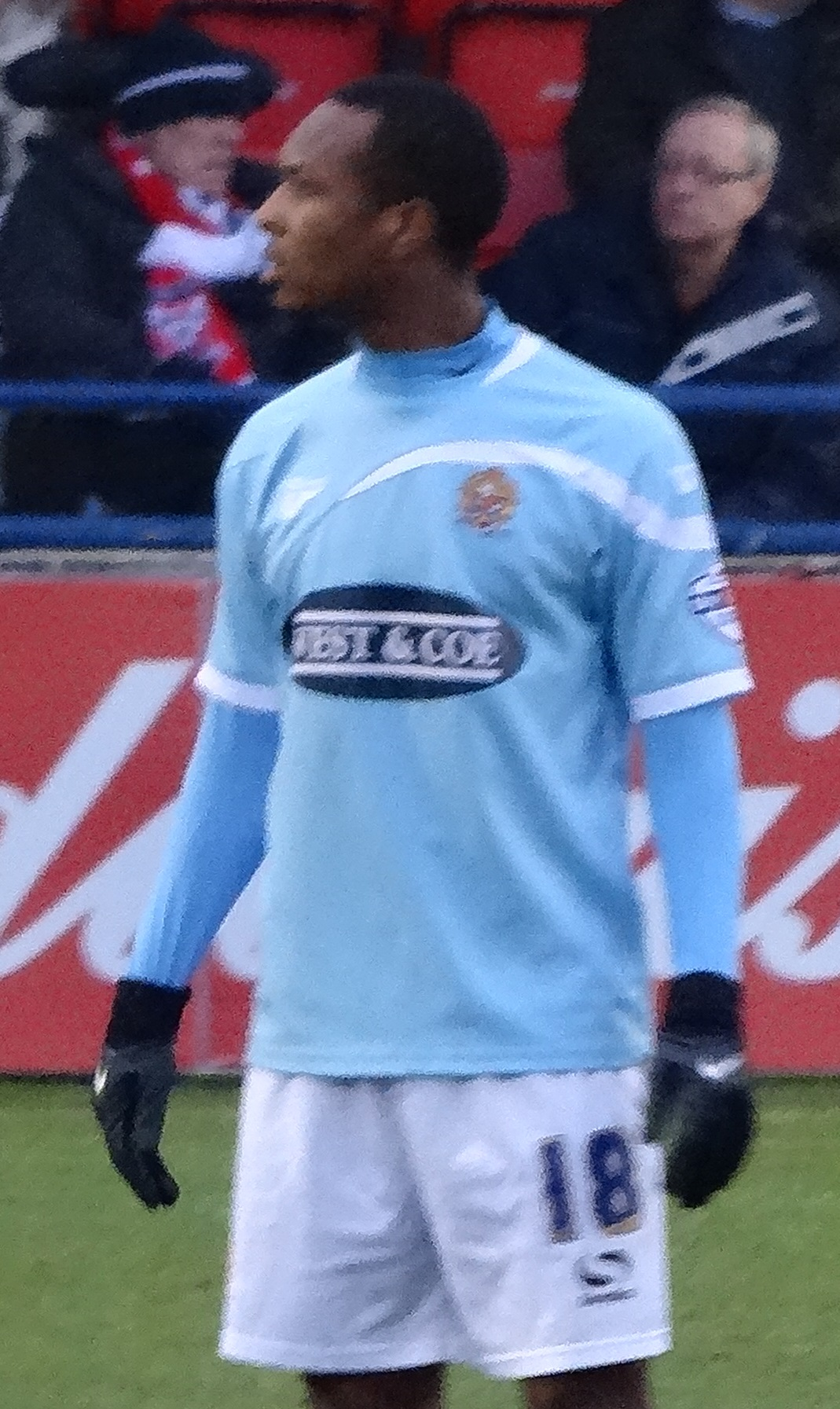
Hoyte playing for Dagenham & Redbridge in 2014

Following his release from Arsenal, Hoyte signed a two-year contract with Dagenham & Redbridge on 10 July 2012, becoming their first signing of the new season. He made his debut on 14 August 2012 against Coventry City in a 1–0 defeat, playing the full 90 minutes. In June 2014, he was released by Dagenham after failing to agree a new contract with the club despite being offered improved terms.

=== Gillingham ===
Following his release from Dagenham & Redbridge, Hoyte signed for Gillingham on a short-term contract. He remained with the Kent-based club until the end of the 2014–15 season.

=== Barnet ===
Hoyte signed for Barnet on a two-year deal in June 2015. He scored his first league goal in a 1–0 win over Bristol Rovers on 9 January 2016. Hoyte missed most of the 2016 calendar year after rupturing his cruciate knee ligament.

=== Eastleigh ===
Hoyte joined Eastleigh on an 18-month contract on 15 December 2016. He was released in May 2018.

=== Return to Dagenham ===
On 28 June 2018 he re-signed for National League side Dagenham & Redbridge on a one-year contract having previously spent two years at the club. He also linked up again with manager Peter Taylor whom he had played under for Gillingham. In May 2019, it was announced that he would be released following the expiration of his contract at the end of the 2018–19 campaign.

=== Maidstone United ===
Hoyte signed a one-year deal with Maidstone United in June 2019. In 2020 he was named vice-captain by manager Hakan Heyrettin. Hoyte went on to make over 150 appearances for the club before leaving at the expiration of his contract at the end of the 2023-24 season.

=== Folkestone Invicta ===
On 17 June 2024, Hoyte joined Isthmian League Premier Division club Folkestone Invicta. He departed the club upon the expiration of his contract at the end of the 2024–25 season.

=== Sittingbourne ===
In June 2025, Hoyte joined Isthmian League South East Division side Sittingbourne.

== International career ==
Hoyte has played for the England national under-17 football team and was a member of the England squad at the 2007 FIFA U-17 World Cup. He played in all five of England's matches in the tournament, coming on as a sub three times and starting the games against Brazil and Germany.

In May 2014, he was called up by Trinidad & Tobago to play on their South American tour which involved fixtures against Argentina in Buenos Aires and Iran in São Paulo, Brazil.

== Personal life ==
He is the son of British sprinters Wendy Hoyte and Les Hoyte (who was born in Trinidad and Tobago), and is the younger brother of Justin Hoyte, who also played for Arsenal. His uncle, Trevor Hoyte, reached the 200m final at the 1978 Commonwealth Games and his cousin, Chris Clarke, is also an elite sprinter.

== Career statistics ==
=== Club ===
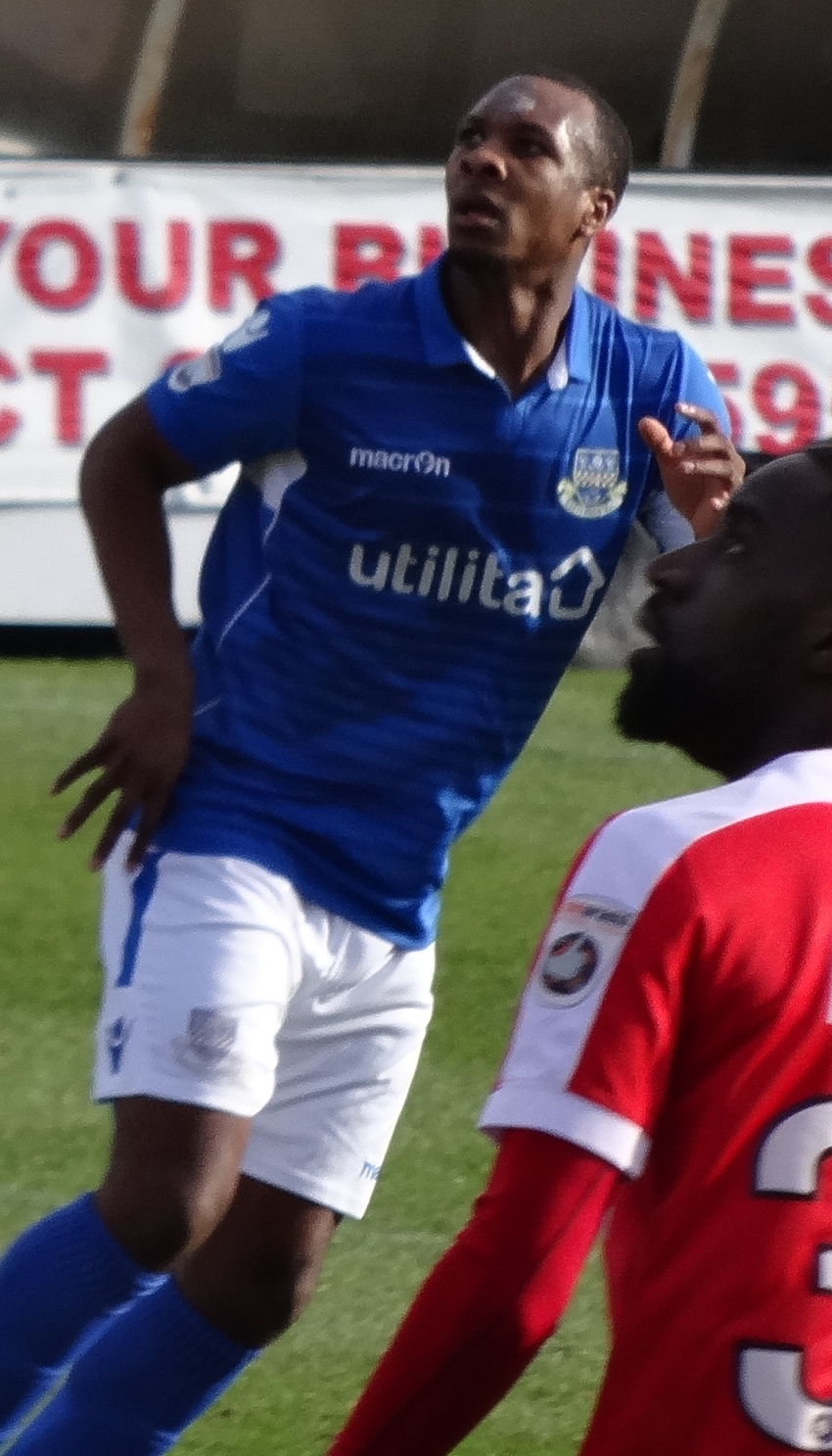
Hoyte playing for Eastleigh in 2017

As of match played 6 February 2021

Appearances and goals by club, season and competition
Club	Season	League			FA Cup		League Cup		Other		Total	
Club	Season	Division	Apps	Goals	Apps	Goals	Apps	Goals	Apps	Goals	Apps	Goals
Arsenal	2008–09	Premier League	1	0	—		3	0	0	0	4	0
Arsenal	2009–10	Premier League	0	0	—		0	0	0	0	0	0
Arsenal	2010–11	Premier League	0	0	—		0	0	0	0	0	0
Arsenal	2011–12	Premier League	0	0	0	0	0	0	0	0	0	0
Arsenal	Total		1	0	0	0	3	0	0	0	4	0
Watford (loan)	2008–09	Championship	7	0	3	0	—		—		10	0
Brighton & Hove Albion (loan)	2009–10	League One	18	0	3	0	—		—		21	0
Lincoln City (loan)	2010–11	League Two	12	0	3	0	—		—		15	0
AFC Wimbledon (loan)	2011–12	League Two	3	0	—		—		—		3	0
Dagenham & Redbridge	2012–13	League Two	26	0	1	0	1	0	2 (Note: Appearances in Football League Trophy)	0	30	0
Dagenham & Redbridge	2013–14	League Two	42	0	1	0	1	0	3	0	47	0
Dagenham & Redbridge	Total		68	0	2	0	2	0	5	0	77	0
Gillingham	2014–15	League One	30	0	1	0	0	0	4	0	35	0
Barnet	2015–16	League Two	19	1	1	0	1	0	1	0	22	1
Barnet	2016–17	League Two	2	0	—		0	0	0	0	2	0
Barnet	Total		21	1	1	0	1	0	1	0	24	1
Eastleigh	2016–17	National League	14	0	1	0	—		—		15	0
Eastleigh	2017–18	National League	31	1	1	0	—		1 (Note: Appearances in FA Trophy)	0	33	1
Eastleigh	Total		45	1	2	0	—		1	0	48	1
Dagenham & Redbridge	2018–19	National League	15	0	0	0	—		2	0	17	0
Maidstone United	2019–20	National League South	33	2	4	0	—		3	0	40	2
Maidstone United	2020–21	National League South	13	0	2	0	—		3	1	18	1
Maidstone United	Total		46	2	6	0	—		6	1	58	3
Career totals			266	4	21	0	6	0	19	1	312	5

=== International ===
As of match played 8 October 2015.

Appearances and goals by national team and year
National team	Year	Apps	Goals
Trinidad and Tobago	2014	2	0
Trinidad and Tobago	2015	1	0
Total		3	0

== Honours ==
England U17

- UEFA European Under-17 Championship runner-up: 2007

England U19

- UEFA European Under-19 Championship runner-up: 2009
