= 2018–19 Gillingham F.C. season =

English football club season

Gillingham
2018–19 season
- Chairman: Paul Scally
- Head Coach: Steve Lovell (until 26 April)
- Stadium: Priestfield Stadium
- League One: 13th
- FA Cup: Fourth round
- EFL Cup: First round
- EFL Trophy: Group stage
- Top goalscorer: League: Tom Eaves (21); All: Tom Eaves (22)
- Highest home attendance: 8,438 vs. Sunderland A.F.C., (21 August 2018)
- Lowest home attendance: 308 vs. Tottenham Hotspur U21, (9 October 2018, EFL Trophy)
- Average home league attendance: 5,050
- Biggest win: 4–0 vs. Bradford City, (27 October 2018)
- Biggest defeat: 0–3 vs. Rochdale, (15 September 2018)
Home colours	Away colours	Third colours

The 2018–19 season was Gillingham's 126th season in their existence and sixth consecutive season in League One. Along with League One, the club also participated in the FA Cup, EFL Cup and EFL Trophy.

The season covers the period from 1 July 2018 to 30 June 2019.

== Transfers ==
=== Transfers in ===
Date from	Position	Nationality	Name	From	Fee	Ref.
1 July 2018	CM	(England)	Regan Charles-Cook	Charlton Athletic	Free transfer	
1 July 2018	CM	(England)	Dean Parrett	AFC Wimbledon	Free transfer	
1 July 2018	CM	(England)	Josh Rees	Bromley	Undisclosed	
2 July 2018	RB	(England)	Barry Fuller	AFC Wimbledon	Free transfer	
2 July 2018	CF	(England)	Brandon Hanlan	Charlton Athletic	Free transfer	
3 July 2018	CM	(Republic of Ireland)	Callum Reilly	Bury	Undisclosed	

=== Transfers out ===
Date from	Position	Nationality	Name	To	Fee	Ref.
1 July 2018	CF	(England)	Greg Cundle	Kingstonian	Released	
1 July 2018	CM	(England)	Jake Hessenthaler	Grimsby Town	Released	
1 July 2018	AM	(England)	Lee Martin	Exeter City	Released	
1 July 2018	AM	(Belgium)	Franck Moussa	Free agent	Released	
1 July 2018	DM	(Wales)	Aaron Morris	Free agent	Released	
1 July 2018	CF	(Republic of Ireland)	Rhys Murphy	Chelmsford City	Released	
1 July 2018	CB	(England)	Ben Nugent	Stevenage	Rejected contract	
1 July 2018	RM	(England)	Scott Wagstaff	AFC Wimbledon	Released	
12 October 2018	CB	(England)	Finn O'Mara	Folkestone Invicta	Free transfer	
17 January 2019	CF	(Republic of Ireland)	Conor Wilkinson	Dagenham & Redbridge	Mutual consent	
31 January 2019	LW	(Iran)	Navid Nasseri	Free agent	Mutual consent	
31 January 2019	CF	(Antigua and Barbuda)	Josh Parker	Charlton Athletic	Undisclosed	
1 February 2019	FW	(England)	Leroy Hlabi	Free agent	Released	
12 February 2019	CF	(England)	Liam Nash	(Republic of Ireland) Cork City	Free transfer	
28 February 2019	RW	(England)	Noel Mbo	(Sweden) Helsingborg	Mutual consent	

=== Loans in ===
Start date	Position	Nationality	Name	From	End date	Ref.
31 August 2018	DF	(England)	Connor Ogilvie	Gillingham	31 May 2019	
30 January 2019	LM	(Scotland)	Billy King	(Scotland) Dundee United	30 May 2019	
31 January 2019	SS	(Republic of Ireland)	Graham Burke	Preston North End	4 May 2019	
31 January 2019	CF	(England)	Tahvon Campbell	Forest Green Rovers	31 May 2019	
31 January 2019	LW	(England)	Ricky Holmes	Sheffield United	4 May 2019	
31 January 2019	CM	(Portugal)	Leonardo Lopes	Wigan Athletic	31 May 2019	

=== Loans out ===
Start date	Position	Nationality	Name	To	End date	Ref.
17 August 2018	GK	(England)	Louie Catherall	Herne Bay	September 2018	
7 September 2018	CF	(England)	Liam Nash	Dulwich Hamlet	12 October 2018	
22 October 2018	CF	(England)	Liam Nash	Concord Rangers	November 2018	
1 November 2018	DF	(England)	Ryan Huckle	Dover Athletic	1 December 2018	
1 November 2018	CF	(Republic of Ireland)	Conor Wilkinson	Dagenham & Redbridge	7 January 2019	
23 November 2018	CM	(England)	Ben Chapman	Faversham Town	December 2018	
30 November 2018	DF	(England)	Danny Divine	Sittingbourne	31 December 2018	
30 November 2018	DF	(England)	Jack Tucker	Hastings United	31 December 2018	
30 November 2018	MF	(England)	Henry Woods	Sittingbourne	31 December 2018	
7 December 2018	GK	(England)	Louie Catherall	Faversham Town	5 January 2019	
7 December 2018	CF	(England)	Leroy Hlabi	Canterbury City	January 2019	
7 December 2018	CB	(England)	Ryan Huckle	Faversham Town	5 January 2019	
18 January 2019	DM	(England)	Bradley Stevenson	Margate	17 February 2019	
22 March 2019	DM	(England)	Bradley Stevenson	Hastings United	4 May 2019	
22 March 2019	DF	(England)	Jack Tucker	Hastings United	4 May 2019	

== Competitions ==
=== Friendlies ===
In May 2018, friendlies with Folkestone Invicta, Faversham Town, Margate, Tonbridge Angels and Eastleigh were announced.

6 July 2018 Friendly	Folkestone Invicta	1–1	Gillingham	Folkestone
19:30 BST	Yussuf 45+2'	Report	Wilkinson 76'	Stadium: Cheriton Road

7 July 2018 Friendly	Sheppey United	1–7	Gillingham	Isle of Sheppey
15:00 BST	Bradshaw	Report	Stevenson; Moussa; Oldaker; Woods (x3); Noyelle	Stadium: The Havill Stadium – Holm Park; Attendance: 529

9 July 2018 Friendly	Deal Town	2–2	Gillingham	Deal
19:30 BST	Coyle 67'; Howard 81' (pen.)	Report	Laing 4'; Trialist 74'	Stadium: Charles Sports Ground

10 July 2018 Friendly	Faversham Town	0–2	Gillingham	Faversham
19:00 BST		Report	Moussa (x2)	Stadium: Salters Lane

10 July 2018 Friendly	Bromley	1–5	Gillingham	Bromley
19:45 BST	Porter	Report	Reilly; Hanlan; Parker; List; Charles-Cook	Stadium: Hayes Lane; Referee: Will Finnie

14 July 2018 Friendly	Margate	3–3	Gillingham	Margate
15:00 BST	Taylor 61' (pen.), 90'; Boateng 87'	Report	Nash 35', 56'; Wilkinson 45'	Stadium: Hartsdown Park

14 July 2018 Friendly	Tonbridge Angels	1–5	Gillingham	Tonbridge
15:00 BST	Read 70'		Hanlan 18'; Wilkinson 52'; Nash 60'; Mbo 77'; Moussa 78'	Stadium: Longmead Stadium

17 July 2018 Friendly	Whitstable Town	0–1	Gillingham	Whitstable
19:45 BST		Report	Derbyshire	Stadium: The Belmont Ground; Attendance: 180

21 July 2018 Friendly	Dover Athletic	0–3	Gillingham	River
15:00 BST		Report	Nasseri (x2); Nash	Stadium: Crabble Athletic Ground

21 July 2018 Friendly	Ebbsfleet United	2–0	Gillingham	Northfleet
15:00 BST	Shields; Adams	Report		Stadium: Stonebridge Road; Attendance: 1,004

24 July 2018 Friendly	Eastleigh	0–4	Gillingham	Eastleigh
19:30 BST		Report	Parrett 24'; List 64'; Nash 77'; Hanlan 80'	Stadium: Silverlake Stadium; Attendance: 491

24 July 2018 Friendly	Chatham Town	1–1	Gillingham	Chatham
19:45 BST	Parsons 12'	Report	Oldaker 77' (pen.)	Stadium: The CJ Doors Stadium

28 July 2018 Friendly	Colchester United	5–1	Gillingham	Colchester
15:00 BST	Szmodics; Collins; Mandron (x2); Eastman	Report	Parrett	Stadium: Colchester Community Stadium; Referee: Mr C Brook

31 July 2018 Friendly	Worthing	3–2	Gillingham	Worthing
19:45 BST	Kealy; Aguiar; Adjiboye	Report	Stevenson; Tucker	Stadium: Woodside Road; Attendance: 252

=== League One ===
==== League table ====
Pos	Team	Pld	W	D	L	GF	GA	GD	Pts
11	Fleetwood Town	46	16	13	17	58	52	+6	61
12	Oxford United	46	15	15	16	58	64	−6	60
13	Gillingham	46	15	10	21	61	72	−11	55
14	Accrington Stanley	46	14	13	19	51	67	−16	55
15	Bristol Rovers	46	13	15	18	47	50	−3	54

Source: EFL Official Website
Rules for classification: 1) Points; 2) Goal difference; 3) Number of goals scored; 4) Head-to-head results

==== Results summary ====
Overall								Home						Away					
Pld	W	D	L	GF	GA	GD	Pts	W	D	L	GF	GA	GD	W	D	L	GF	GA	GD
46	15	10	21	61	71	−10	55	7	4	12	27	36	−9	8	6	9	34	35	−1

Last updated: 4 May 2019.
Source: BBC

==== Matches ====
On 21 June 2018, the League One fixtures for the season were announced.

4 August 2018 1	Accrington Stanley	0–2	Gillingham	Accrington
15:00 BST		Report	Hanlan 23'; Parker 43'	Stadium: Crown Ground; Attendance: 2,201; Referee: Anthony Backhouse

11 August 2018 2	Gillingham	3–1	Burton Albion	Gillingham
15:00 BST	Eaves 35'; O'Neill 51'; Eaves 77'; Parker (yellow card) 90+3'; O'Neill (yellow card) 90+6'	Report	Boyce 26'; McFadzean (yellow card) 79'	Stadium: Priestfield Stadium; Attendance: 5016; Referee: Lee Probert

18 August 2018 3	Walsall	2–1	Gillingham	Walsall
15:00 BST	Ferrier 12'; Osbourne 42'	Report	Eaves 90+3'	Stadium: Bescot Stadium; Attendance: 4,361; Referee: Trevor Kettle

21 August 2018 4	Gillingham	1–4	Sunderland	Gillingham
19:45 BST	Eaves 3'	Report	Maguire 4'; Honeyman 18'; Power 20'; Maja 59'	Stadium: Priestfield Stadium; Attendance: 8,438; Referee: Anthony Coggins

25 August 2018 5	Gillingham	1–1	Coventry City	Gillingham
15:00 BST	List 70'	Report	Clarke-Harris 46'	Stadium: Priestfield Stadium; Attendance: 4,880; Referee: Michael Salisbury

1 September 2018 6	Barnsley	2–1	Gillingham	Barnsley
15:00 BST	Moore 13', 34' (pen.)	Report	Parker 61'	Stadium: Oakwell; Attendance: 11,434; Referee: John Busby

8 September 2018 7	Gillingham	0–1	AFC Wimbledon	Gillingham
15:00 BST		Report	Pigott 53'	Stadium: Priestfield Stadium; Attendance: 5,246; Referee: Nick Kinseley

15 September 2018 8	Rochdale	3–0	Gillingham	Rochdale
15:00 BST	Henderson 9', 18', 64'	Report		Stadium: Spotland Stadium; Attendance: 2,925; Referee: Martin Coy

22 September 2018 9	Gillingham	2–4	Peterborough United	Gillingham
15:00 BST	Reilly 50'; Byrne 53'	Report	Walker 24'; Dembélé 59'; Toney 64'; Cooke 87'	Stadium: Priestfield Stadium; Attendance: 4,407; Referee: Lee Swabey

29 September 2018 10	Shrewsbury Town	2–2	Gillingham	Shrewsbury
15:00 BST	Angol 59'; Norburn 88'	Report	Hanlan 18'; Eaves 90'	Stadium: New Meadow; Attendance: 5,695; Referee: Ross Joyce

6 October 2018 11	Portsmouth	0–2	Gillingham	Milton
15:00 BST		Report	Eaves 26'; Lacey 45+2'	Stadium: Fratton Park; Attendance: 18,158; Referee: Chris Sarginson

13 October 2018 12	Gillingham	0–2	Southend United	Gillingham
15:00 BST		Report	Cox 51', 53'	Stadium: Priestfield Stadium; Attendance: 5,584; Referee: John Busby

20 October 2018 13	Doncaster Rovers	3–3	Gillingham	Doncaster
15:00 BST	Marquis 51'; Wilks 67'; Whiteman (yellow card) 74'; Taylor 90+1'	Report	Fuller 7'; Eaves 25', (yellow card) 71'; Zakuani (yellow card) 26'; Stevenson (yellow card) 28'; Reilly (yellow card) 65'; Ehmer 88'	Stadium: Keepmoat Stadium; Attendance: 6,891; Referee: Graham Salisbury

23 October 2018 14	Plymouth Argyle	3–1	Gillingham	Plymouth
19:45 BST	Ladapo 22', 34'; Lameiras 73'	Report	O'Neill 76'	Stadium: Home Park; Attendance: 8,754; Referee: Darren England

27 October 2018 15	Gillingham	4–0	Bradford City	Gillingham
15:00 BST	Charles-Cook 48'; Eaves 65', 90+1'; List 69'	Report	O'Brien (yellow card) 24'; Wright (yellow card) 61'	Stadium: Priestfield Stadium; Attendance: 4,399; Referee: Lee Collins

3 November 2018 16	Gillingham	3–0	Fleetwood Town	Gillingham
15:00 GMT	Hanlan 11'; Eaves 18', 55', (yellow card) 88'; Byrne (yellow card) 30'	Report	Coyle (yellow card) 76'	Stadium: Priestfield Stadium; Attendance: 3,916; Referee: Charles Breakspear

6 November 2018 17	Gillingham	0–1	Blackpool	Gillingham
19:45 GMT		Report	Delfouneso 49'	Stadium: Priesfield Stadium; Attendance: 4,055; Referee: Craig Hicks

17 November 2018 18	Oxford United	1–0	Gillingham	Oxford
15:00 GMT	Brannagan (yellow card) 40'; Henry 59' (pen.); Browne (yellow card) 83'; Bradbury (yellow card) 89'	Report	Zakuani (yellow card) 73'	Stadium: Kassam Stadium; Attendance: 6,628; Referee: Neil Hair

24 November 2018 19	Gillingham	1–3	Luton Town	Gillingham
15:00 GMT	Eaves 72'	Report	Shinnie 25'; Lee 55', 68'	Stadium: Priesfield Stadium; Attendance: 5,671; Referee: Kevin Johnson

27 November 2018 20	Bristol Rovers	1–2	Gillingham	Horfield
19:45 GMT	Sercombe 87'	Report	List 8'; Reilly 59' (red card) 70'	Stadium: Memorial Stadium; Referee: Ollie Yates

8 December 2018 21	Scunthorpe United	0–2	Gillingham	Scunthorpe
15:00 GMT		Report	Eaves 54'; Parrett 56'	Stadium: Glanford Park; Attendance: 3,054; Referee: Graham Salisbury

15 December 2018 22	Gillingham	2–2	Wycombe Wanderers	Gillingham
15:00 GMT	Eaves 56'; Parker 76'	Report	El-Abd 12'; Tyson 17'	Stadium: Priesfield Stadium; Attendance: 4,687; Referee: Dean Whitestone

22 December 2018 23	Charlton Athletic	2–0	Gillingham	Charlton
15:00 GMT	Reeves 6'; Fosu 39'; Bielik (yellow card) 56'	Report		Stadium: The Valley; Attendance: 12,836; Referee: Charles Breakspear

26 December 2018 24	Gillingham	2–0	Portsmouth	Gillingham
13:00 GMT	Byrne (yellow card) 20'; Parker 45'; Fuller (yellow card) 60'; Reilly 90+1' (pen.)	Report	Whatmough (yellow card) 90+1'	Stadium: Priestfield Stadium; Attendance: 6,940; Referee: Nick Kinseley

29 December 2018 25	Gillingham	1–3	Doncaster Rovers	Gillingham
15:00 GMT	Byrne (yellow card) 39'; Reilly 88'	Report	Marquis 28'; Rowe (yellow card) 53'; Wilks 54'; Andrew 61'	Stadium: Priestfield Stadium; Attendance: 4,791; Referee: Neil Hair

1 January 2019 26	Southend United	2–0	Gillingham	Southend-on-Sea
15:00 GMT	Mantom 40'; Bwomono (yellow card) 74'; Robinson (yellow card) 90' (yellow-red card) 90+3'; Moore 90+5'	Report	Bingham (yellow card) 39'; Lacey (yellow card) 90+5'	Stadium: Roots Hall; Attendance: 7,903; Referee: Keith Stroud

12 January 2019 27	Burton Albion	2–3	Gillingham	Burton upon Trent
15:00 GMT	Turner (yellow card) 45+2'; Fraser 52', 60'	Report	List 24'; Reilly 45+3' (pen.); Charles-Cook (yellow card) 76'; Rees 90+1'	Stadium: Pirelli Stadium; Attendance: 2,634; Referee: Peter Wright

19 January 2019 28	Gillingham	0–3	Walsall	Gillingham
		Report	Cook 9', 19', 47'	Stadium: Priestfield Stadium; Attendance: 3,975; Referee: Darren Drysdale

29 January 2019 29	Gillingham	0–0	Accrington Stanley	Gillingham
19:45 GMT	Ehmer (yellow card) 56'	Report	Smyth (yellow card) 85'	Stadium: Priestfield Stadium; Attendance: 3,423; Referee: Craig Hicks

2 February 2019 30	Coventry City	1–1	Gillingham	Coventry
15:00 GMT	Enobakhare 68'; Burge (yellow card) 89'	Report	Byrne (yellow card) 57'; Eaves 90+2' (pen.)	Stadium: Ricoh Arena; Attendance: 26,741; Referee: Kevin Johnson

9 February 2019 31	Gillingham	1–4	Barnsley	Gillingham
15:00 GMT	List 81'; Zakuani (yellow card) 90'; Fuller (yellow card) 90'; Ehmer (yellow card) 90+11'	Report	Moore 1'; Woodrow 45', 71'; McGeehan (yellow card) 63'; Cavaré (yellow card) 81'; Brown 90+11'	Stadium: Priestfield Stadium; Attendance: 4,791; Referee: Trevor Kettle

16 February 2019 32	Gillingham	1–0	Scunthorpe United	Gillingham
15:00 GMT	Byrne 30'; Reilly (yellow card) 90+2'	Report	van Veen (yellow card) 50'	Stadium: Priestfield Stadium; Attendance: 4,170; Referee: Lee Swabey

19 February 2019 33	Sunderland	4–2	Gillingham	Sunderland
19:45 GMT	Cattermole 4'; Flanagan 10'; Honeyman (yellow card) 54'; Grigg 66' (pen.); Dunne (yellow card) 68'; McGeady 77' (pen.)	Report	Eaves 6'; Burke (yellow card) 34'; Hanlan 40'; Byrne (yellow card) 59'; Lopes (yellow card) 65'	Stadium: Stadium of Light; Attendance: 28,364; Referee: Matthew Donohue

23 February 2019 34	Wycombe Wanderers	0–1	Gillingham	High Wycombe
15:00 GMT		Report	Burke (yellow card) 66'; Charles-Cook 83'	Stadium: Adams Park; Attendance: 4,879; Referee: Carl Boyeson

2 March 2019 35	Fleetwood Town	1–1	Gillingham	Fleetwood
15:00 GMT	Evans (yellow card) 45+2'; Husband 90+1'; Coyle (yellow card) 90+3'	Report	Parrett (yellow card) 45+2'; Lopes (yellow card) 52'; Eaves 83'	Stadium: Highbury Stadium; Attendance: 3,019; Referee: Neil Hair

9 March 2019 36	Gillingham	1–0	Oxford United	Gillingham
15:00 GMT	Eaves (penalty missed) 52'; Fuller (yellow card) 87'; Hanlan 89'; O'Neill (yellow card) 90+2'	Report	Dickie (yellow card) 50'	Stadium: Priestfield Stadium; Attendance: 4,991; Referee: Oliver Yates

12 March 2019 37	Gillingham	0–1	Bristol Rovers	Gillingham
19:45 GMT	Fuller (yellow card) 90+4'	Report	Clarke-Harris 57'	Stadium: Priestfield Stadium; Attendance: 3,938; Referee: Christopher Sarginson

16 March 2019 38	Luton Town	2–2	Gillingham	Luton
15:00 GMT	Hylton 45'; Stacey 67'	Report	Eaves 53'; O'Neill 79'; Hanlan (yellow card) 90+2'	Stadium: Kenilworth Road; Attendance: 9,963; Referee: Andy Haines

23 March 2019 39	AFC Wimbledon	2–4	Gillingham	London
15:00 GMT	Folivi 22'; Pigott (yellow card) 34'; Seddon (yellow card) 52'; Hanson 90+7'	Report	Byrne (yellow card) 32'; Hanlan 40'; Burke 42'; Ehmer (yellow card) 48'; Lopes 50'; Eaves 83'	Stadium: Kingsmeadow; Attendance: 4,847; Referee: Lee Collins

30 March 2019 40	Gillingham	1–1	Rochdale	Gillingham
15:00 GMT	Byrne 45+2'; Hanlan (yellow card) 59'; Fuller (yellow card) 90+6'	Report	Henderson (yellow card) 22' (goal) 37'; Ebanks-Landell (yellow card) 52'; Wilbraham (yellow card) 62'; Andrew (yellow card) 65'; Bunney (yellow card) 80'	Stadium: Priestfield Stadium; Attendance: 4,686; Referee: Alan Young

6 April 2019 41	Peterborough United	2–0	Gillingham	Peterborough
15:00 BST	Maddison 57' (pen.) (yellow card) 69'; Toney (yellow card) 62'; Godden 85'	Report	O'Neill (yellow card) 28'; Parrett (yellow card) 82'	Stadium: London Road Stadium; Attendance: 8,331; Referee: Robert Jones

13 April 2019 42	Gillingham	0–2	Shrewsbury Town	Gillingham
15:00 BST	Byrne (yellow card) 87'	Report	Bolton 50'; Campbell 61'; Docherty (yellow card) 66'	Stadium: Priestfield Stadium; Attendance: 4,109; Referee: Thomas Bramall

19 April 2019 43	Gillingham	3–1	Plymouth Argyle	Gillingham
15:00 BST	Byrne (yellow card) 28' (goal) 58'; Charles-Cook 56'; Hanlan 90+1'	Report	Ladapo 25'; Sarcevic (yellow card) 32'; Smith-Brown (yellow card) 71'	Stadium: Priestfield Stadium; Attendance: 5,987; Referee: Antony Coggins

22 April 2019 44	Bradford City	1–1	Gillingham	Bradford
15:00 BST	Mellor 10'; Clarke (yellow card) 61'; Doyle (yellow card) 88'	Report	Hanlan 53'	Stadium: Valley Parade; Attendance: 15,686; Referee: Eddie Ilderton

27 April 2019 45	Gillingham	0–2	Charlton Athletic	Gillingham
15:00 BST	O'Neill (yellow card) 18'; Byrne (yellow card) 65'; Ogilvie (yellow card) 83'	Report	Aribo 24'; Cullen 42' (yellow card) 81'; Pratley (yellow card) 45+1'	Stadium: Priestfield Stadium; Attendance: 8,047; Referee: Lee Swabey

4 May 2019 46	Blackpool	0–3	Gillingham	Blackpool
17:30 BST	Tilt (yellow card) 86'; Mafoumbi (yellow card) 86'	Report	Hanlan 7'; Eaves 30', 39' (yellow card) 86'; Garmston (yellow card) 51'; Lopes (yellow card) 60'	Stadium: Bloomfield Road; Attendance: 9,571; Referee: Oliver Yates

=== FA Cup ===
The first round draw was made live on BBC by Dennis Wise and Dion Dublin on 22 October. The draw for the second round was made live on BBC and BT by Mark Schwarzer and Glenn Murray on 12 November. The third round draw was made live on BBC by Ruud Gullit and Paul Ince from Stamford Bridge on 3 December 2018. The fourth round draw was made live on BBC by Robbie Keane and Carl Ikeme from Wolverhampton on 7 January 2019.

10 November 2018 First round	Gillingham	0–0	Hartlepool United	Gillingham
15:00 GMT		Report		Stadium: Priestfield Stadium; Attendance: 2,224; Referee: Brett Huxtable

21 November 2018 First round replay	Hartlepool United	3–4 (a.e.t.)	Gillingham	Hartlepool
19:45 GMT	Magnay 21'; McLaughlin 32'; O'Neill 114'	Report	Ehmer 50'; Eaves 90+6' (pen.); O'Neill 102'; List 107'	Stadium: Victoria Park; Attendance: 1,873; Referee: Scott Oldham

2 December 2018 Second round	Slough Town	0–1	Gillingham	Slough
14:00 GMT		Report	Oldaker 48'	Stadium: Arbour Park; Referee: Christopher Sarginson

5 January 2019 Third round	Gillingham	1–0	Cardiff City	Gillingham
15:00 GMT	Zakuani (yellow card) 49'; List 81'; Parker (yellow card) 90+3'	Report		Stadium: Priestfield Stadium; Attendance: 7,090; Referee: Tim Robinson

26 January 2019 Fourth round	Swansea City	4–1	Gillingham	Swansea
15:00 GMT	McBurnie 10', 32'; Carter-Vickers (yellow card) 14'; Celina 73'; McKay 84'	Report	Rees 51'	Stadium: Liberty Stadium; Attendance: 15,080; Referee: Darren England

=== EFL Cup ===
On 15 June 2018, the draw for the first round was made in Vietnam.

14 August 2018 First round	Millwall	0–0 (3–1 p)	Gillingham	Bermondsey
19:45 BST		Report		Stadium: The Den; Attendance: 4,401; Referee: Charles Breakspear
	Penalties
	Wallace (penalty missed); Elliott (penalty scored); Webster (penalty scored); Ferguson (penalty scored)		Byrne (penalty missed); O'Neill (penalty scored); Parker (penalty missed); Hanlan (penalty missed)

=== EFL Trophy ===
On 13 July 2018, the initial group stage draw bar the U21 invited clubs was announced.

Pos	Lge	Team	Pld	W	PW	PL	L	GF	GA	GD	Pts	Qualification
1	L1	Portsmouth	3	3	0	0	0	8	2	+6	9	Round 2
2	ACA	Tottenham Hotspur U21	3	1	0	1	1	7	4	+3	4	Round 2
3	L1	Gillingham	3	1	0	0	2	2	9	−7	3	
4	L2	Crawley Town	3	0	1	0	2	2	4	−2	2	

Source: EFL.com

4 September 2018 Group stages	Portsmouth	4–0	Gillingham	Milton
19:45 BST	Clarke 41'; Close 43'; Pitman 55' (pen.); Wheeler 90+1'	Report		Stadium: Fratton Park; Attendance: 2,011; Referee: Alan Young

9 October 2018 Group stages	Gillingham	0–4	Tottenham Hotspur U21	Charlton
19:45 BST		Report	Roles 44'; Maghoma 57'; Brown 83'; Duncan 90+3' (pen.)	Stadium: The Valley; Attendance: 308

13 November 2018 Group stages	Gillingham	2–1	Crawley Town	Gillingham
19:45 GMT	List 59'; Stevenson 88'	Report	Poleon 18'	Stadium: Priestfield Stadium; Attendance: 473
