= 2017–18 Gillingham F.C. season =

English football club season

Gillingham
2017–18 season
- Chairman: Paul Scally
- Head Coach: Adrian Pennock (until 25 September); Steve Lovell (from 16 November)
- Stadium: Priestfield Stadium
- League One: 17th
- FA Cup: Second round
- EFL Cup: First round
- EFL Trophy: Second round
- Top goalscorer: League: Tom Eaves (17); All: Tom Eaves (18)
- Highest home attendance: 8,163 vs Portsmouth (8 October 2017); League One
- Lowest home attendance: 1,224 vs Oxford United (5 December 2017); EFL Trophy
- Average home league attendance: 5,370
Home colours	Away colours	Third colours

The 2017–18 season was Gillingham's 125th season in their existence and fifth consecutive season in League One. Along with League One, the club participated in the FA Cup, EFL Cup and EFL Trophy. The season covered the period from 1 July 2017 to 30 June 2018.

== Transfers ==
=== Transfers in ===
Date from	Position	Nationality	Name	From	Fee	Ref.
1 July 2017	CF	(England)	Tom Eaves	Yeovil Town	Free	
1 July 2017	CB	(England)	Alex Lacey	Yeovil Town	Free	
1 July 2017	RB	(England)	Luke O'Neill	Southend United	Free	
1 July 2017	CF	(Republic of Ireland)	Conor Wilkinson	Bolton Wanderers	Free	
1 July 2017	CB	(Democratic Republic of the Congo)	Gabriel Zakuani	Northampton Town	Free	
18 July 2017	CM	(England)	Billy Bingham	Crewe Alexandra	Free	
21 July 2017	ST	(England)	Liam Nash	Maldon & Tiptree	Free	
15 August 2017	CB	(England)	Ben Nugent	Crewe Alexandra	Free	
17 August 2017	GK	(England)	Steve Arnold	Dover Athletic	Free	
15 September 2017	′CM	(England)	Jesse Starkey	Swindon Town	Free	

=== Transfers out ===
Date from	Position	Nationality	Name	To	Fee	Ref.
1 July 2017	CM	(England)	Bradley Dack	Blackburn Rovers	£750,000	
1 July 2017	CB	(England)	Mitchell Dickenson	Hythe Town	Released	
1 July 2017	CF	(Northern Ireland)	Rory Donnelly	Cliftonville	Released	(Note: Rory Donnelly joined Cliftonville following his release.)
1 July 2017	CB	(Australia)	Chris Herd	Western Sydney Wanderers	Released	
1 July 2017	RB	(England)	Ryan Jackson	Colchester United	Released	(Note: Ryan Jackson joined Colchester United following his release.)
1 July 2017	CM	(England)	Billy Knott	Lincoln City	Free	
1 July 2017	RW	(England)	Sam Lawford	Faversham Town	Released	(Note: Sam Lawford joined Faversham Town following his release.)
1 July 2017	CF	(England)	Cody McDonald	AFC Wimbledon	Free	
1 July 2017	CM	(England)	Ollie Muldoon	Free agent	Released	
1 July 2017	GK	(England)	Henry Newcombe	Free agent	Released	
1 July 2017	CM	(Republic of Ireland)	Emmanuel Osadebe	Cambridge United	Released	(Note: Emmanuel Osadebe joined Cambridge United following his release.)
1 July 2017	CB	(Pakistan)	Zesh Rehman	Southern District	Released	(Note: Zesh Rehman joined Southern District following his release.)
1 July 2017	GK	(England)	Will Sykes	Free agent	Released	
31 August 2017	CM	(England)	Josh Wright	Southend United	Mutual consent	(Note: Josh Wright joined Southend United following his departure.)

=== Loans in ===
Start date	Position	Nationality	Name	From	End date	Ref.
7 July 2017	LB	(England)	Connor Ogilvie	Tottenham Hotspur	February 2018	
31 August 2017	RM	(England)	Sean Clare	Sheffield Wednesday	3 January 2018	

=== Loans out ===
Start date	Position	Nationality	Name	To	End date	Ref.
18 August 2017	GK	(England)	Tom Hadler	Gloucester City	1 January 2018	
25 August 2017	FW	(England)	Noel Mbo	Hampton & Richmond Borough	22 September 2017	
25 August 2017	DF	(England)	Finn O'Mara	Folkestone Invicta	21 October 2017	(Note: On 26 September 2017, Finn O'Mara agreed to extend his loan with Folkestone Invicta.)
25 August 2017	MF	(England)	Bradley Stevenson	Cray Wanderers	10 December 2017	(Note: On 8 September 2017, Bradley Stevenson agreed to extend his loan with Cray Wanderers.)
26 September 2017	FW	(England)	Noel Mbo	Kingstonian	24 October 2017	
8 November 2017	FW	(England)	Liam Nash	Leatherhead	9 December 2017	
9 November 2017	MF	(England)	Bradley Stevenson	Tonbridge Angels	9 December 2017	
24 November 2017	CM	(England)	Jesse Starkey	Worthing	23 December 2017	
1 December 2017	CB	(England)	Finn O'Mara	Folkestone Invicta	6 January 2018	

== Competitions ==
=== Friendlies ===
As of 27 June 2017, Gillingham have announced nine pre-season friendlies against Faversham Town, Dartford, Dover Athletic, Chatham Town, Ipswich Town, Patro Eisden, Colchester United and Canvey Island

7 July 2017	Faversham Town	0–1	Gillingham	Faversham
19:30 BST		Report	Eaves 22'	Stadium: Salters Lane; Attendance: 1,214; Referee: Jack Packman

11 July 2017	Dartford	1–2	Gillingham	Dartford
19:30 BST	Murphy 74'	Report	Zakuani 5'; Parker 31'	Stadium: Princes Park; Attendance: 710; Referee: Charles Breakspear

15 July 2017	Dover Athletic	2–2	Gillingham	River
15:00 BST	Bird 7'; Gallifuoco 61'	Report	Wilkinson 30'; O'Neill 60'	Stadium: Crabble Athletic Ground; Attendance: 1,084; Referee: Garry Maskell

18 July 2017	Chatham Town	0–12	Gillingham	Chatham
19:30 BST		Report	Oldaker 10'; Wilkinson 35', 38'; Wright 40', 86' pen Garmston 44'; Eaves 48'; Mbo 60'; Nash (Trialist) 72', 83' pen Hessenthaler 80'; List 82'	Stadium: The Sports Ground; Attendance: 1,120; Referee: Mr I Searle

22 July 2017	Gillingham	2–1	Ipswich Town	Gillingham
15:00 BST	Eaves 52' (pen.); Wagstaff 78'	Report	Rowe 80'	Stadium: Priestfield; Referee: Craig Hicks

25 July 2017	Gillingham	4–1	Patro Eisden (Belgium)	Gillingham
19:30 BST	Oldaker; Wright (?); Ogilvie; Mbo (?)	Report	Tsirlidis (?)	Stadium: Priestfield; Referee: James Linington

28 July 2017	Colchester United	1-2	Gillingham	Colchester
19:30 BST	Jackson 75'	Report	Martin 30'; Parker 52'	Stadium: Weston Homes Community Stadium; Referee: Gavin Ward

29 July 2017	Canvey Island	0-1	Gillingham XI	Canvey Island
15:00 BST			Hessenthaler 86'	Stadium: Park Lane

=== League One ===
==== League table ====
Pos	Team	Pld	W	D	L	GF	GA	GD	Pts
15	Doncaster Rovers	46	13	17	16	52	52	0	56
16	Oxford United	46	15	11	20	61	66	−5	56
17	Gillingham	46	13	17	16	50	55	−5	56
18	AFC Wimbledon	46	13	14	19	47	58	−11	53
19	Walsall	46	13	13	20	53	66	−13	52

Source: BBC Sport
Rules for classification: 1) Points; 2) Goal difference; 3) Number of goals scored

==== Results summary ====
Overall								Home						Away					
Pld	W	D	L	GF	GA	GD	Pts	W	D	L	GF	GA	GD	W	D	L	GF	GA	GD
27	8	10	9	29	30	−1	34	3	7	4	17	16	+1	5	3	5	12	14	−2

Last updated: 13 January 2018.

==== Matches ====
On 21 June 2017, the league fixtures were announced.

5 August 2017 1	Doncaster Rovers	0–0	Gillingham	Doncaster
15:00 BST		Report	Eaves (yellow card) 61'	Stadium: Keepmoat Stadium; Attendance: 7,512; Referee: Dean Whitestone

12 August 2017 2	Gillingham	0–1	Bradford City	Gillingham
15:00 BST	Lacey (yellow card) 31'; Byrne (yellow card) 55'; Wilkinson (red card) 75'	Report	Poleon 19'; Reeves (yellow card) 22'; Patrick (yellow card) 29'; McMahon (yellow card) 62'	Stadium: Priestfield Stadium; Attendance: 5,267; Referee: John Busby

19 August 2017 3	Milton Keynes Dons	1–0	Gillingham	Denbigh
15:00 BST	Tshibola (yellow card) 36'; Sow 47'	Report	Byrne (yellow card) 39'; Ehmer (yellow card) 76'	Stadium: Stadium mk Attendance: 7,901; Referee: Trevor Kettle

26 August 2017 4	Gillingham	3–3	Southend United	Gillingham
15:00 BST	Byrne (yellow card) 51'; Eaves 56', 63', 80' (yellow card) 90+3'; Ogilvie (yellow card) 89'	Report	Timlin (yellow card) 11'; Leonard 20'; Demetriou (yellow card) 58'; Kightly 65'; Cox 73'; Hendrie (yellow card) 87'	Stadium: Priestfield Stadium; Attendance: 5,339; Referee: Charles Breakspear

2 September 2017 5	Gillingham	1–2	Shrewsbury Town	Gillingham
15:00 BST	Eaves (yellow card) 74'; Parker 76'	Report	Morris 30'; Rodman 37'; Brown (yellow card) 68'	Stadium: Priestfield Stadium; Referee: Kevin Johnson

9 September 2017 6	Oxford United	3–0	Gillingham	Oxford
15:00 BST	Payne 48'; Rothwell 54'; Hall 56'	Report		Stadium: Kassam Stadium; Attendance: 6,730; Referee: Michael Salisbury

12 September 2017 7	AFC Wimbledon	1–1	Gillingham	Norbiton
19:45 BST	Barcham 35'; Oshilaja (yellow card) 42'; Taylor (yellow card) 45+3'; Nightingale (yellow card) 65'	Report	Martin (red card) 45+3'; Wagstaff (yellow card) 45+3'; Clare 45+4'; Eaves (yellow card) 81'; Byrne (yellow card) 82'	Stadium: Kingsmeadow; Attendance: 3,819; Referee: Nick Kinseley

16 September 2017 8	Gillingham	1–0	Charlton Athletic	Gillingham
15:00 BST	Ehmer (yellow card) 13'; O'Neill (yellow card) 26'; Eaves 54'; Nugent (yellow card) 65'	Report	Kashi (yellow card) 45+1'; Solly (yellow card) 84'; Holmes (yellow card) 90+3'	Stadium: Priestfield Stadium; Attendance: 7,216; Referee: Graham Salisbury

23 September 2017 9	Rochdale	3–0	Gillingham	Spotland
15:00 BST	Henderson 24'; Rafferty 26'; Davies (yellow card) 36'; Williams (yellow card) 57'; Done 90+1'	Report	Eaves (yellow card) 30' (yellow-red card) 44'; Zakuani (yellow card) 48'	Stadium: Spotland Stadium; Attendance: 2,793; Referee: Eddie Ilderton

26 September 2017 10	Gillingham	0–0	Scunthorpe United	Gillingham
19:45 BST		Report		Stadium: Priestfield Stadium; Attendance: 4,002; Referee: Antony Coggins

30 September 2017 11	Blackburn Rovers	1–0	Gillingham	Blackburn
15:00 BST	Samuel 31'; Chapman (yellow card) 63'	Report	Byrne (yellow card) 11'; Clare (yellow card) 23'	Stadium: Ewood Park; Attendance: 10,844; Referee: Robert Jones

8 October 2017 12	Gillingham	0–1	Portsmouth	Gillingham
14:30 BST	Ehmer (yellow card) 85'	Report	Clarke (yellow card) 45+1'; Kennedy 46'; Thompson (yellow card) 74'	Stadium: Priestfield Stadium; Attendance: 8,163; Referee: Chris Sarginson

14 October 2017 13	Peterborough United	0–1	Gillingham	Peterborough
15:00 BST	Baldwin (yellow card) 20'	Report	Martin 35'; Hessenthaler (yellow card) 58'; Wagstaff (yellow card) 77'; Wilkinson (yellow card) 83'	Stadium: London Road Stadium; Attendance: 5,257; Referee: Dean Whitestone

17 October 2017 14	Gillingham	1–1	Wigan Athletic	Gillingham
19:45 BST	Eaves 55'	Report	Morsy 82' (yellow card) 84'	Stadium: Priestfield Stadium; Attendance: 4,705; Referee: Brett Huxtable

21 October 2017 15	Gillingham	1–2	Northampton Town	Gillingham
15:00 BST	Martin 62'; Zakuani (yellow card) 89'	Report	Buchanan (yellow card) 9'; Powell 45'; McWilliams (yellow card) 70'; Grimes 73' (yellow card) 86'	Stadium: Priestfield Stadium; Attendance: 4,640; Referee: Ross Joyce

28 October 2017 16	Rotherham United	1–3	Gillingham	Rotherham
15:00 BST	Moore 56'; Wood (yellow card) 82'; Mattock (yellow card) 85' (yellow-red card) 85'	Report	Parker 2', 86'; Eaves 47'; Ogilvie (yellow card) 90+6'	Stadium: New York Stadium; Attendance: 7,865; Referee: Carl Boyeson

11 November 2017 17	Gillingham	1–1	Bury	Gillingham
15:00 GMT	Ehmer (yellow card) 6'; O'Neill (yellow card) 59'; Parker 85'	Report	Ince (yellow card) 25'; Danns 39'; Edwards (yellow card) 69'; Williams (yellow card) 78'	Stadium: Priestfield Stadium; Attendance: 4,364; Referee: Charles Breakspear

18 November 2017 18	Walsall	0–1	Gillingham	Bescot
15:00 GMT		Report	Wilkinson 44'; Ehmer (yellow card) 45+1' (yellow-red card) 72'; Eaves (yellow card) 55'; Martin (yellow card) 69'	Stadium: Bescot Stadium; Attendance: 4,917; Referee: Andy Haines

21 November 2017 19	Blackpool	1–1	Gillingham	Blackpool
19:45 GMT	Vassell 41'	Report	Hessenthaler (yellow card) 70'; Eaves 90'	Stadium: Bloomfield Road; Attendance: 2,650; Referee: Darren Drysdale

25 November 2017 20	Gillingham	0–0	Oldham Athletic	Gillingham
15:00 GMT	Byrne (yellow card) 33'	Report	Gardner (yellow card) 40'; Gerrard (yellow card) 68'; Bryan (yellow card) 90'	Stadium: Priestfield Stadium; Attendance: 4,364; Referee: Graham Horwood

9 December 2017 21	Plymouth Argyle	2–1	Gillingham	Plymouth
15:00 GMT	Grant 55'; Diagouraga 90'	Report	Wagstaff (yellow card) 36'; Nugent (yellow card) 57'; Eaves 84'; Byrne (yellow card) 87'	Stadium: Home Park; Attendance: 11,155; Referee: Darren Handley

16 December 2018 22	Gillingham	4–1	Bristol Rovers	Gillingham
15:00 GMT	Byrne 28' 53'; Lacey 37'; Parker 47'; Martin (yellow card) 67'; Ehmer (yellow card) 90+4'	Report	Smith (yellow card) 65'; Sercombe 90+1'	Stadium: Priestfield Stadium; Attendance: 4,227; Referee: (England) Anthony Coggins

22 December 2017 23	Fleetwood Town	0–2	Gillingham	Fleetwood
19:00 GMT	Cargill (yellow card) 26'	Report	Parker 2'; O'Neill 15'	Stadium: Highbury Stadium; Attendance: 2,088; Referee: (England) David Webb

26 December 2017 24	Gillingham	1–1	Oxford United	Gillingham
13:00 GMT	Wilkinson 87'; Hessenthaler (yellow card) 90+3'	Report	Ricardinho 52' (yellow card) 90'; Ledson (yellow card) 68'; Payne (yellow card) 72'; Carroll (yellow card) 90+3'	Stadium: Priestfield Stadium; Attendance: 5,555; Referee: (England) Nick Kinseley

30 December 2017 25	Gillingham	2–2	AFC Wimbledon	Gillingham
15:00 GMT	Francomb 62' (o.g.); Ehmer 69' (yellow card) 83'	Report	Taylor 67' (pen.); Abdou (yellow card) 72'; Forrester 84'	Stadium: Priestfield Stadium; Attendance: 6,419; Referee: (England) Rob Lewis

1 January 2018 26	Charlton Athletic	1–2	Gillingham	London
15:00 GMT	Forster-Caskey (yellow card) 29'; Aribo 83'; Kashi (yellow card) 90+1'; Lennon (yellow card) 90+3'	Report	Parker 11' (yellow card) 53'; Eaves 32'; O'Neill (yellow card) 45+2'; Clare (yellow card) 90+4'	Stadium: The Valley; Attendance: 11,979; Referee: (England) Oliver Langford

13 January 2018 27	Gillingham	2–1	Rochdale	Gillingham
15:00 GMT	Garmston 41'; Martin 63'; Eaves (yellow card) 77'	Report	Cannon 27' (yellow card) 87'; Ntlhe (yellow card) 7'; Camps (yellow card) 75'	Stadium: Priestfield Stadium; Attendance: 4,352; Referee: (England) Lee Swabey

20 January 2018 28	Scunthorpe United	1–3	Gillingham	Scunthorpe
15:00 GMT	van Veen (yellow card) 38'; Morris 52'	Report	Martin 25'; Reilly (yellow card) 41'; Eaves (yellow card) 43' (goal) 73'; Parker 68'; Ogilvie (yellow card) 90'	Stadium: Glanford Park; Attendance: 4,905; Referee: Carl Boyeson

27 January 2018 29	Gillingham	2-1	Fleetwood Town	Gillingham
15:00 GMT	Hessenthaler (yellow card) 40'; Eaves 53', 90+1' (pen.); Martin (yellow card) 67'	Report	Madden 13' (yellow card) 90+1'; Diagouraga (yellow card) 48'; Neal (yellow card) 85'; Bolger (yellow card) 87'	Stadium: MEMS Priestfield Stadium; Attendance: 6,332; Referee: Brett Huxtable

3 February 2018 30	Wigan Athletic	2-0	Gillingham	Wigan
	Grigg 10'; Powell 34'	Report	Garmston (yellow card) 17'; Ehmer (yellow card) 21'; Eaves (yellow card) 71'	Stadium: DW Stadium; Attendance: 8,384; Referee: Nick Kinseley

10 February 2018 31	Gillingham	1–1	Peterborough United	Gillingham
15:00 GMT	Ehmer 90+3'	www.bbc.co.uk/sport/football/42927422	Lloyd 67'	Stadium: Priestfield Stadium; Attendance: 7,154; Referee: Andy Davies

13 February 2018 32	Northampton Town	1–2	Gillingham	Northampton
19:45 GMT	Taylor 56'	Report	Parker 6'; Eaves 18'	Stadium: Sixfields Stadium; Attendance: 5,123; Referee: Charles Breakspear

17 February 2018 33	Gillingham	0–0	Walsall	Gillingham
15:00 GMT	Wilkinson (yellow card) 86'	Report	Dobson (yellow card) 86'	Stadium: Priestfield Stadium; Attendance: 4,682; Referee: Kevin Johnson

20 February 2018 34	Shrewsbury Town	1–1	Gillingham	Shrewsbury
19:45 GMT	Ogogo 14'; Thomas (yellow card) 49'	Report	Nugent (yellow card) 36'; Byrne 82'	Stadium: New Meadow; Attendance: 4,839; Referee: Craig Hicks

24 February 2018 35	Bury	2–1	Gillingham	Bury
15:00 GMT	Danns 12'; Bunn 25'	Report	Ogilvie 69'	Stadium: Gigg Lane; Attendance: 3,004; Referee: Darren Drysdale

10 March 2018 36	Portsmouth	1–3	Gillingham	Portsmouth
15:00 GMT	Lowe 19'; Burgess (yellow card) 28'	Report	Wilkinson 48'; Martin 66', 80'	Stadium: Fratton Park; Attendance: 18,247; Referee: Carl Boyeson

24 March 2018 37	Bradford City	1–0	Gillingham	Bradford
	Warnock (yellow card) 43'; Poleon 48'; Devine (yellow card) 90+1'; Bruner (yellow card) 90+5'	Report	Zakuani (yellow card) 62'	Stadium: Valley Parade; Attendance: 19,654; Referee: Ross Joyce

29 March 2018 38	Gillingham	1–2	Milton Keynes Dons	Gillingham
19:45 BST	Nasseri 41' Wagstaff (yellow card) 99'; Ehmer (yellow card) 80'; O'Neill (yellow card) 90+4'	Report	Aneke 34', (yellow card) 90+1'; Pawlett (yellow card) 45+1'; Brittain (yellow card) 65'; Williams 85'; Lewington (yellow card) 87'	Stadium: Priestfield Stadium; Attendance: 5,540; Referee: John Busby

2 April 2018 39	Southend United	4–0	Gillingham	Southend-on-Sea
15:00 BST	Turner 8'; Robinson 11'; Kightly 18'; McLaughlin 39'	Report	Hessenthaler (yellow card) 15'; Martin (red card) 45+3'; Nugent (yellow card) 57'; Wagstaff (yellow card) 62'; Byrne (yellow card) 65'	Stadium: Roots Hall; Attendance: 8,466; Referee: Graham Salisbury

7 April 2018 40	Gillingham	0–0	Doncaster Rovers	Gillingham
15:00 BST	Wilkinson (yellow card) 13'	Report	McCullough (yellow card) 77'	Stadium: Priestfield Stadium; Attendance: 4,870; Referee: John Brooks

10 April 2018 41	Gillingham	0–0	Blackburn Rovers	Gillingham
19:45 BST		Report	Lenihan (yellow card) 90+3'	Stadium: Priestfield Stadium; Attendance: 6,361; Referee: Andy Woolmer

14 April 2018 42	Oldham Athletic	1–1	Gillingham	Oldham
15:00 BST	Fané (yellow card) 26'; Nazon 45'; Byrne (yellow card) 70'; Edmundson (yellow card) 79'; Hunt (yellow card) 89'; Moimbé (red card) 90'	Report	Eaves 90+2' (pen.)	Stadium: Boundary Park; Attendance: 3,850; Referee: Michael Salisbury

17 April 2018 43	Gillingham	0–1	Rotherham United	Gillingham
19:45 BST		Report	Vaulks 20', (yellow card) 87'; Smith (yellow card) 45'; Towell (yellow card) 64'	Stadium: Priestfield Stadium; Attendance: 4,029; Referee: Dean Whitestone

21 April 2018 44	Gillingham	0–3	Blackpool	Gillingham
15:00 BST		Report	Vassell 28'; Delfouneso 33' (yellow card) 67'; Spearing (penalty missed) 48'; Lumley (yellow card) 78'; Turton (yellow card) 80'; Mellor 83'	Stadium: Priestfield Stadium; Attendance: 5,580; Referee: Craig Hicks

28 April 2018 45	Bristol Rovers	1–1	Gillingham	Bristol
15:00	Harrison (yellow card) 45+1'; Bennett (yellow card) 52'; Telford 86'	Report	Byrne (yellow card) 35'; List 90+4'	Stadium: Memorial Stadium; Attendance: 9,715; Referee: Oliver Yates

5 May 2018 46	Gillingham	5–2	Plymouth Argyle	Gillingham
17:30 GMT	Parker 7'; Eaves 30', 36', 51'; Zakuani (yellow card) 45+2'; Wilkinson (yellow card) 85'; List 90+1'	Report	Grant 23'; Carey 77'; Songo'o (yellow card) 85'	Stadium: Priestfield Stadium; Attendance: 6,269; Referee: Brendan Malone

=== FA Cup ===
On 16 October 2017, Gillingham were drawn at home against Dagenham & Redbridge or Leyton Orient in the first round. Another home fixture was confirmed for the second round with Carlisle United the visitors.

4 November 2017 First round	Gillingham	2–1	Leyton Orient	Gillingham
15:00 GMT	Parker 20'; Eaves 75'; Clare (yellow card) 78'; Wilkinson (yellow card) 81'	Report	Grainger (yellow card) 35'; Lawless (yellow card) 76'; Dayton 79' (yellow card) 81'; Harrold (yellow card) 82'; Widdowson (yellow card) 87' (yellow-red card) 90+2'	Stadium: Priestfield Stadium; Attendance: 3,659; Referee: John Brooks

2 December 2017 Second round	Gillingham	1–1	Carlisle United	Gillingham
14:00 GMT	O'Neill 5'; Clare (yellow card) 40'	Report	Grainger 18' (pen.)	Stadium: Priestfield Stadium; Attendance: 3,178; Referee: Andy Woolmer

12 December 2017 Second round replay	Carlisle United	v	Gillingham	Carlisle
19:45 GMT				Stadium: Brunton Park
Note: On 12 December, the second round replay tie was postponed due to a frozen pitch.

19 December 2017 Second round replay	Carlisle United	3-1	Gillingham	Carlisle
19:45 GMT	Hope 7' 37'; Liddle (yellow card) 73'; Lambe (yellow card) 86'; Miller (yellow card) 90+2'; Miller 90+3'	Report	Clare (yellow card) 25'; Wagstaff 47'; Byrne (yellow card) 57'; Parker (yellow card) 66'; Ehmer (yellow card) 77'; O'Neill (yellow card) 90+1'	Stadium: Brunton Park; Attendance: 2,357; Referee: (England) Mark Heywood

=== EFL Cup ===
On 16 June 2017, Gillingham were drawn away to Reading in the first round.

8 August 2017 First round	Reading	2–0	Gillingham	Reading
20:00 BST	Kelly 71', 86'	Report	Cundle (yellow card) 39'	Stadium: Madejski Stadium; Attendance: 5,936; Referee: Brett Huxtable

=== EFL Trophy ===
Pos	Lge	Team	Pld	W	PW	PL	L	GF	GA	GD	Pts	Qualification
1	L1	Gillingham (Q)	3	3	0	0	0	10	6	+4	9	Round 2
2	L1	Southend United (Q)	3	2	0	0	1	4	2	+2	6	Round 2
3	L2	Colchester United (E)	3	0	1	0	2	2	5	−3	2	
4	ACA	Reading U21 (E)	3	0	0	1	2	7	10	−3	1	

Updated to match(es) played on 7 November 2017. Source: EFL.com
(E) Eliminated; (Q) Qualified to the phase indicated

29 August 2017	Gillingham	2–1	Southend United	Gillingham
19:45 BST	Parker 8' (yellow card) 33'; Ferdinand 57' (o.g.); Ogilvie (yellow card) 63'; Wilkinson (yellow card) 90+12'	Report	McLaughlin 31'; White (yellow card) 55'; Ba (yellow card) 66'; McGlashan (yellow card) 73'; Oxley (yellow card) 90+12'	Stadium: Priestfield Stadium; Attendance: 1,549

3 October 2017	Colchester United	0–1	Gillingham	Colchester
19:45 BST	Kent (yellow card) 34'	Report	Hessenthaler (yellow card) 45+1'; Ehmer (yellow card) 58' (goal) 90+1'; Bingham (yellow card) 90+3'	Stadium: Colchester Community Stadium; Attendance: 684; Referee: John Brooks

7 November 2017	Gillingham	7–5	Reading U21s	Gillingham
19:45 GMT	Cundle 1'; Wilkinson 12'; Wagstaff 29' (yellow card) 53'; O'Neill 39'; Mbo (yellow card) 65' (goal) 80'; Oldaker 82', 90'	Report	Rollinson 38'; Popa 49', 83'; Holmes (yellow card) 52'; Medford-Smith 57'; Sheppard 68'	Stadium: Priestfield Stadium; Attendance: 1,039; Referee: Craig Hicks

5 December 2017 Second round	Gillingham	1–2	Oxford United	Gillingham
19:00 GMT	Byrne 9' (pen.); Nugent (yellow card) 48'	Report	Payne 31'; Carroll (yellow card) 77'; Ricardinho (yellow card) 86'; Mowatt 90+2'; Mousinho (yellow card) 90+4'	Stadium: Priestfield Stadium; Attendance: 1,224; Referee: Charles Breakspear

== Squad statistics ==
Numbers in parentheses denote appearances as substitute.
Players with squad numbers struck through and marked † left the club during the playing season.
Players with names in italics and marked * were on loan from another club for the whole of their season with Gillingham.
Players listed with no appearances have been in the matchday squad but only as unused substitutes.
Key to positions: GK – Goalkeeper; DF – Defender; MF – Midfielder; FW – Forward

No.	Pos.	Nat.	Name	Apps	Goals	Apps	Goals	Apps	Goals	Apps	Goals	Apps	Goals	Yellow card	Red card
No.	Pos.	Nat.	Name	League		FA Cup		League Cup		FL Trophy		Total		Discipline	
1	GK	ENG	Stuart Nelson	0	0	0	0	0	0	2	0	2	0	0	0
2	DF	ENG	Luke O'Neill	21 (1)	1	2 (1)	1	1	0	2	1	26 (2)	3	5	0
3	DF	IRL	Bradley Garmston	5 (3)	1	0 (1)	0	0	0	0	0	5 (4)	1	0	0
4	DF	ENG	Alex Lacey	10	1	1	0	0	0	1	0	12	1	1	0
5	DF	GER	Max Ehmer	23 (1)	1	3	0	1	0	4	1	31 (1)	2	9	1
6	DF	COD	Gabriel Zakuani	23	0	2	0	0	0	0	0	25	0	2	0
7	MF	ENG	Scott Wagstaff	9 (7)	0	2 (1)	1	1	0	3	1	15 (8)	2	4	0
8	MF	ENG	Jake Hessenthaler	17 (3)	0	2	0	1	0	2	0	22 (3)	0	4	0
9	FW	ENG	Tom Eaves	22 (2)	10	3	1	1	0	1 (1)	0	27 (3)	11	8	1
10	FW	IRL	Conor Wilkinson	11 (8)	2	1 (2)	0	0 (1)	0	3	1	14 (12)	3	3	1
11	MF	ENG	Lee Martin	24	4	2 (1)	0	0	0	1	0	27 (1)	4	2	1
12	DF	ENG	Connor Ogilvie *	20 (6)	0	2	0	1	0	2	0	25 (6)	0	4	0
13	GK	CZE	Tomáš Holý	28	0	3	0	1	0	0	0	32	0	1	0
14	FW	ATG	Josh Parker	21 (7)	8	2 (1)	1	1	0	3	1	27 (8)	10	3	0
16	MF	ENG	Billy Bingham	9	0	0	0	0	0	0 (1)	0	9 (1)	0	1	0
17	FW	ENG	Noel Mbo	0	0	0	0	0	0	0 (1)	1	0 (1)	1	1	0
18	MF	ENG	Bradley Stevenson	0	0	0	0	0	0	0 (1)	0	0 (1)	0	0	0
19	DF	ENG	Ben Nugent	9 (3)	0	1	0	0	0	3	0	13 (3)	0	3	0
20	MF	ENG	Darren Oldaker	0 (3)	0	0	0	1	0	3 (1)	2	4 (4)	2	0	0
21	MF	ENG	Elliott List	6 (7)	0	1 (1)	0	0	0	2 (1)	0	9 (9)	0	0	0
22	MF	ENG	Ben Chapman	0	0	0	0	0 (1)	0	1 (1)	0	1 (2)	0	0	0
23	DF	ENG	Aaron Simpson	0	0	0	0	0	0	2 (1)	0	2 (1)	0	0	0
24	FW	ENG	Greg Cundle	1 (5)	0	0	0	1	0	2 (1)	1	4 (6)	1	1	0
25	DF	IRL	Finn O'Mara	1 (1)	0	0	0	0	0	2	0	3 (1)	0	0	0
~~26~~ †	GK	ENG	Steve Arnold	0	0	0	0	0	0	2	0	2	0	0	0
26	MF	IRL	Callum Reilly *	1	0	0	0	0	0	0	0	1	0	1	0
27	FW	ENG	Liam Nash	2 (7)	0	0	0	0 (1)	0	0 (1)	0	2 (9)	0	0	0
~~28~~ †	MF	ENG	Sean Clare *	20 (1)	1	3	0	0	0	2	0	25 (1)	1	5	0
~~29~~ †	MF	ENG	Jesse Starkey	0 (1)	0	0	0	0	0	0	0	0 (1)	0	0	0
30	GK	ENG	Tom Hadler	0	0	0	0	0	0	0	0	0	0	0	0
31	DF	ENG	Jack Tucker	0 (1)	0	0	0	0	0	0 (1)	0	0 (2)	0	0	0
32	MF	ENG	Miquel Scarlett	0	0	0	0	0	0	0	0	0	0	0	0
33	MF	IRL	Mark Byrne	23 (1)	2	3	0	0	0	1 (1)	1	27 (2)	3	8	0
~~44~~ †	MF	ENG	Josh Wright	2 (1)	0	0	0	1	0	0	0	3 (1)	0	0	0

Players not included in matchday squads
No.	Pos.	Nat.	Name
15	MF	WAL	Aaron Morris
28	MF	BEL	Franck Moussa
