= Bradley Stevenson =

English footballer (born 1998)

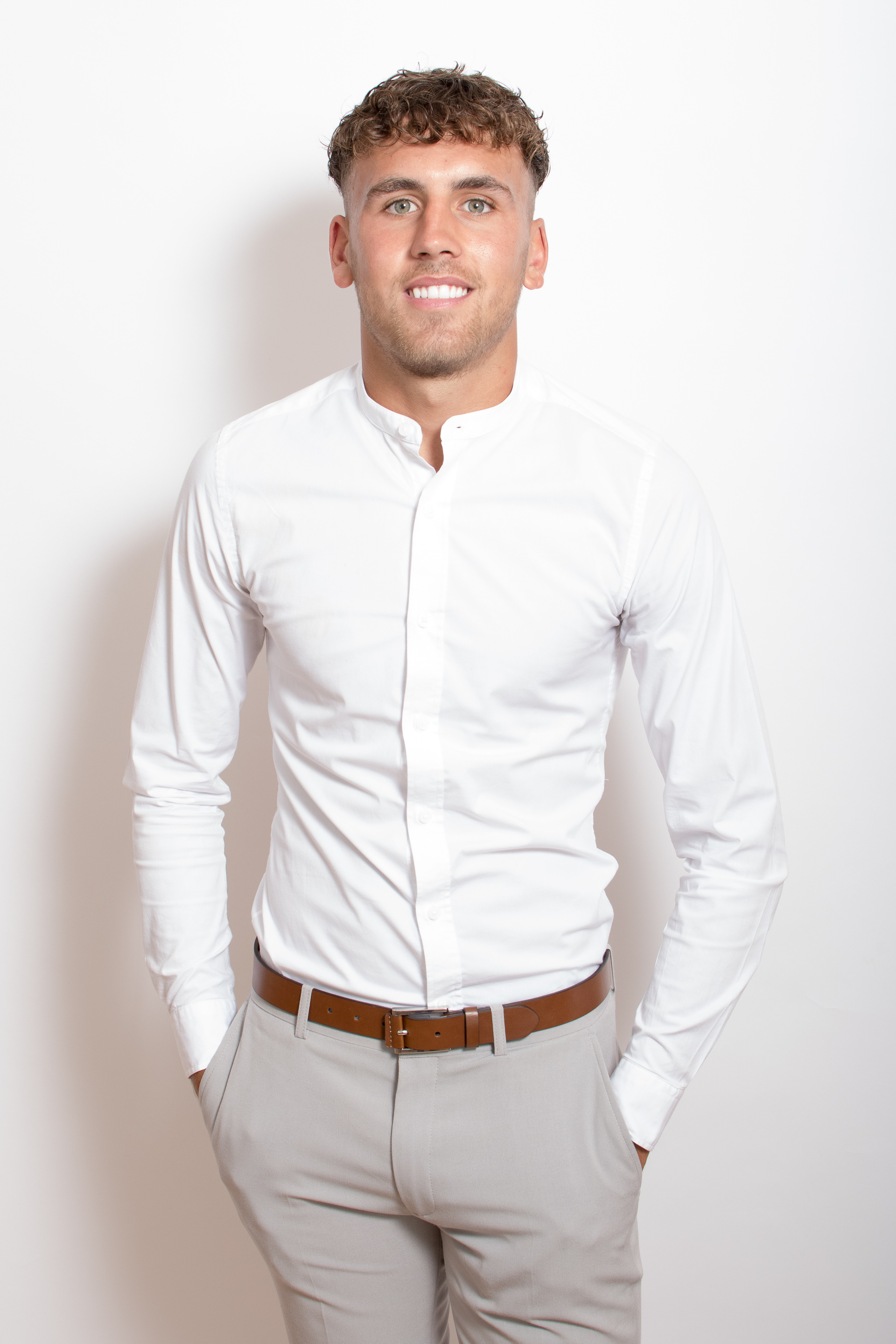

Personal information
- Date of birth: 12 September 1998 (age 28)
- Place of birth: Canterbury, Kent, England
- Position: Midfielder

Team information
- Current team: Chatham Town

Youth career
- Tyler Hill Youth
- 2006–2016: Gillingham

Senior career*
Years	Team	Apps	(Gls)
2016–2019	Gillingham	3	(0)
2017	→ Hastings United (loan)	6	(2)
2017	→ Cray Wanderers (loan)	6	(3)
2017	→ Tonbridge Angels (loan)	6	(0)
2019	→ Margate (loan)	6	(0)
2019	→ Hastings United (loan)		
2019	Herne Bay	4	(2)
2019–2020	Chelmsford City	5	(0)
2020–2021	Herne Bay	7	(0)
2021–2022	Welling United	38	(3)
2022–2024	Billericay Town	83	(36)
2024–2026	Solihull Moors	74	(9)
2026–	Chatham Town	0	(0)
- * Club domestic league appearances and goals as of 17:39, 2 July 2026 (UTC)

Bradley Stevenson (born 12 September 1998) is an English professional footballer who plays as a midfielder for Isthmian League Premier Division club Chatham Town.

== Club career ==
On 30 August 2016, Stevenson made his Gillingham debut in their EFL Trophy tie against Luton Town, in which he replaced Mitchell Dickenson in the 60th minute during the 2–1 defeat.

Following his return from a successful loan stint with Cray Wanderers, Stevenson appeared for Gillingham in an EFL Trophy tie against Reading under-21's, which finished 7–5 to Gillingham at the end of 90 minutes. On 9 November 2017, Stevenson signed for Tonbridge Angels on a month-long loan.

In January 2019, Stevenson joined Margate on a month-long loan. On 22 March 2019, he was loaned out to Hastings United for the rest of the season together with his teammate Jack Tucker.

He was offered a new contract by Gillingham at the end of the 2018–19 season. In August 2019, Stevenson was released by Gillingham, joining Herne Bay a month later. On 29 November 2019, after five goals in ten games in all competitions for Herne Bay, Stevenson signed for Chelmsford City. On 23 January 2020, Chelmsford confirmed the departure of Stevenson from the club.

In the summer of 2021, Stevenson joined Welling United after a second spell with Herne Bay, linking up with Steve Lovell, the manager that gave him his Football League debut.

In June 2022, Stevenson joined Billericay Town following their relegation to the Isthmian League Premier Division.

On 9 July 2024, Stevenson joined National League side Solihull Moors.

On 2 July 2026, Stevenson joined Isthmian League Premier Division club Chatham Town.

== Career statistics ==
As of end of 2023–24 season.

Club	Season	League			FA Cup		League Cup		Other		Total	
Club	Season	Division	Apps	Goals	Apps	Goals	Apps	Goals	Apps	Goals	Apps	Goals
Gillingham	2016–17	League One	0	0	0	0	0	0	1 (Note: Appearance(s) in EFL Trophy)	0	1	0
Gillingham	2017–18	League One	0	0	0	0	0	0	1	0	1	0
Gillingham	2018–19	League One	3	0	0	0	1	0	2	1	6	1
Gillingham	Total		3	0	0	0	1	0	4	1	8	1
Herne Bay	2019–20	Isthmian League South East Division	4	2	—		—		6 (Note: Four appearances and three goals in Alan Turvey Trophy, one appearance in FA Trophy, one appearance in Kent Senior Cup)	3	10	5
Chelmsford City	2019–20	National League South	5	0	—		—		0	0	5	0
Herne Bay	2019–20	Isthmian League South East Division	1	0	—		—		0	0	1	0
Herne Bay	2020–21	Isthmian League South East Division	6	0	1	0	—		2 (Note: Appearance(s) in FA Trophy)	0	9	0
Herne Bay	Total		7	0	1	0	0	0	2	0	10	0
Welling United	2021–22	National League South	38	3	1	0	—		1	0	40	3
Billericay Town	2022–23	Isthmian League Premier Division	41	18	4	2	—		4 (Note: Two appearances in FA Trophy, one appearance and one goal in Alan Turvey Trophy, one appearance in Essex Senior Cup)	1	49	21
Billericay Town	2023–24	Isthmian League Premier Division	42	18	5	4	—		5 (Note: Three appearances and four goals in FA Trophy, two appearances in Alan Turvey Trophy)	4	52	26
Billericay Town	Total		83	36	9	6	0	0	9	5	101	47
Career total			140	41	11	6	1	0	22	9	174	56
