= Bradley Garmston =

Footballer (born 1994)

Personal information
- Full name: Bradley Jordan Garmston
- Date of birth: 18 January 1994 (age 32)
- Place of birth: Chorley, Staffordshire, England
- Height: 1.77 m (5 ft 10 in)
- Position: Defender

Senior career*
| Years | Team | Apps | (Gls) |
| –2012 | Sutton Coldfield Town | | |
| 2012–2015 | West Bromwich Albion | 0 | (0) |
| 2013 | → Colchester United (loan) | 13 | (0) |
| 2015 | → Gillingham (loan) | 8 | (1) |
| 2015–2020 | Gillingham | 76 | (1) |
| 2020 | Grimsby Town | 5 | (1) |
| Total | | 102 | (3) |

International career
| | Republic of Ireland U17 | 5 | (2) |
| 2011–2013 | Republic of Ireland U19 | 11 | (0) |
| 2014 | Republic of Ireland U21 | 4 | (0) |
- * Club domestic league appearances and goals

Bradley Jordan Garmston (born 18 January 1994) is an English former professional footballer who played as a defender.

Having come through the academy at non-league side Sutton Coldfield Town he went on to join West Bromwich Albion where he spent time on loan with both Colchester United and Gillingham. He joined the Gills permanently in 2015, going to make 76 league appearances over five years before joining Grimsby Town. He was released by Grimsby in the summer of 2020 and has remained without a club. Born in England, he was capped for the Republic of Ireland U17 as well as U19 and U21 level.

== Club career ==
=== West Bromwich Albion ===
Born in Chorley, Staffordshire, Garmston started his football career at the West Bromwich Albion academy after he was spotted by the club whilst playing for non-League side Sutton Coldfield Town. Garmston progressed through West Bromwich Albion's academy and making a number of appearances for the club's development squad.

Garmston signed an initial one-year contract with West Bromwich Albion on 10 July 2013. The club, once again, opted to take up their option of a contract extension on the player to stay for another season. He made his West Bromwich Albion debut in the pre-season friendly against Port Vale on 5 August 2014. Garmston was given number thirty-three for the 2014–15 season. At the end of the 2014–15 season, he was released by the club.

==== Loan spells ====
On 14 February 2013, Garmston joined Colchester United on a one-month youth loan. He made his Football League debut for the club, starting the whole game, in Colchester United's 3–0 away defeat to Sheffield United on 16 February 2013. Garmston helped the club keep three consecutive clean sheets between 26 February 2013 and 5 March 2013. His loan spell at Colchester United was later extended to the end of the 2012–13 season. He made his 13th and final appearance for Colchester on the final day of the season, coming on as a substitute for George Porter in a 2–0 win at Carlisle United, helping the club avoid relegation. At the end of the 2012–13 season, Garmston went on to make thirteen appearances in all competitions and returned to his parent club.

After Manager Alan Irvine told four youngsters, including Garmston, he was loaned out to Gillingham on 16 January 2015 for a one-month loan. Garmston made his Gillingham debut on 17 January 2015, starting the whole game, in a 3–1 win over Coventry City. Three weeks later on 10 February 2015, he provided an assist for Bradley Dack to help the club beat Peterborough United 2–1 on 10 February 2015. This was followed up by scoring his first goal for Gillingham, in a 4–2 win over Milton Keynes Dons on 14 February 2015. Two days later, Garmston extended his loan spell with the "Gills" until 15 March 2015. However, he suffered a hamstring and was substituted in the 57th minute, in the club's loss against Barnsley on 27 February 2015. As a result, Garmston returned to his parent club, as he made nine appearances and scoring once in all competitions.

=== Gillingham ===
After being released by West Bromwich Albion, Garmston re-joined Gillingham on a three-year contract. He made his Gillingham debut since joining them in a pre-season friendly, in a 3–0 win over Folkestone Invicta on 7 July 2015.

However at the start of the 2015–16 season, Garmston found his playing time, mostly coming from the substitute bench. By mid–October, he became a first team regular for the club, playing in the left–back position. Garmston then scored his first goal for Gillingham against Yeovil Town in the last 16 of the EFL Trophy on 10 November 2015, as the club lost 5–4 on penalties following a 1–1 draw through penalties. However, he suffered a hamstring injury that saw him miss two matches. Garmston made his return to the first team from injury against Barnsley on 13 February 2016 and played 64 minutes before being substituted, as Gillingham won 2–1. Following this, he found himself in and out of the starting line–up, due to a competition from Adam Chicksen and Brennan Dickenson for the rest of the 2015–16 season. At the end of the 2015–16 season, Garmston went on to make thirty–eight appearances and scoring once in all competitions.

Ahead of the 2016–17 season, Garmston dislocated his knee in the Gillingham's pre–season tour during a match against AS Étaples on 18 July 2016 and was sidelined for six weeks. However, he was later sidelined for a month. Garmston made his first appearance of the season, coming against his former club, West Bromwich Albion U23 in the EFL Trophy and set up the club's first goal of the game, in a 2–0 win. After the match, he said it was good to make his comeback and spoke about his injuries on Kent Online. However, his return was short–lived when Garmston suffered a hamstring injury during a FA Cup match against Brackley Town on 16 November 2016 and was substituted in the 67th minute, as Gillingham lost 4–3. After the match, he was sidelined for the rest of the year with a hamstring injury. Garmston made his return to the starting line–up against Shrewsbury Town on 28 January 2017, coming on as a 72nd-minute substitute, as Gillingham drew 1–1. He then appeared in the club's next four out of the five matches, mostly coming from the substitute bench. However, Garmston suffered a hamstring injury during a match against AFC Wimbledon on 21 February 2017 and was sidelined for the rest of the 2016–17 season. At the end of the 2016–17 season, he went on to make seven appearances in all competitions.

Ahead of the 2017–18 season, Garmston made a recovery and was featured in Gillingham's pre–season friendly matches. However, he suffered a calf injury that saw him miss the start of the 2017–18 season. By October, Garmston made a recovery and was featured in a friendly match against Phoenix Sports, where he played 45 minutes, as the club won 6–5 on penalties following a 2–2 draw. Garmston made his first appearance of the season against Peterborough United on 14 October 2017, starting a match before being substituted at half time, as Gillingham won 1–0. But he was plagued with injuries on two separate occasions that affected the remaining months of 2017. Garmston made his return to the first team, coming on as an 82nd-minute substitute, in a 2–2 draw against AFC Wimbledon on 30 December 2017. Two weeks later on 13 January 2018, he scored the equalising goal for the club, in a 2–1 win against Rochdale. After the match, Garmston said on Kent Online that he was happy to score. This was followed up by setting up Gillingham's third goal of the game, in a 3–1 win against Scunthorpe United. Following this, Garmston began rotating in playing either in the left–back position and left–midfield position for the next three months. At times, he was placed on the substitute bench, due to competitions, as well as, his own injury concerns. At the end of the 2017–18 season, Garmston went on to make twenty appearances and scoring once in all competitions. Following this, he was offered a new contract by the club on 18 May 2018. On 31 May 2018, Garmston signed a contract extension with Gillingham, keeping him until 2020.

At the start of the 2018–19 season, Garmston started in the first nine league matches of the season, playing in the left–back position. He also competed with Connor Ogilvie over the left–back position and found his playing time, mostly coming from the substitute bench as a result. Despite this, Garmston contributed to a match against Crawley Town in the EFL Trophy match and set up the winning goal for Bradley Stevenson, in a 2–1 win. From 1 January 2019 and 26 January 2019, he started five times for Gillingham, playing in the left–midfield position. Following this, Garmston, once again, returned to the substitute bench for the next three months. On 22 April 2019, he made his first appearance in three months, coming on as a 40th-minute substitute, in a 1–1 draw against Bradford City. In the last game of the season against Blackpool, Garmston made his first starts in four months and set up the third goal of the game, in a 3–0 win. At the end of the 2018–19 season, he went on to make twenty–six appearances in all competitions.

Ahead of the 2019–20 season, new manager Steve Evans said he's willing to give Garmston more playing time, but was reminded of the competitions. However, he failed to make a first team breakthrough under Evans. Despite this, Garmston made only two starts for Gillingham, both coming from the EFL Trophy against Ipswich Town and Tottenham Hotspur U21. In the January transfer window, he was linked a move to Ebbsfleet United but the club rejected the bid. It was announced on 31 January 2020 that Gillingham released Garmston.

=== Grimsby Town ===
Following his release from Gillingham, Garmston joined League Two side Grimsby Town for the rest of the 2019–20 season.

He made his debut for the club, starting a match and played 59 minutes before being substituted, in a 3–2 win against his former club, Colchester United on 11 February 2020. Two weeks later on 25 February 2020, Garmston scored his first goal for Grimsby Town, in a 4–2 win against Newport County. However, the 2019–20 season came to a premature end, due to the COVID-19 pandemic and the club finished fifteenth place. Having made five appearances for Grimsby Town, he was released by the club at the conclusion of the 2019–20 season.

== International career ==
Garmston represented Republic of Ireland at under-17, under-19 and Republic of Ireland U21 levels.

In September 2010, Garmston was called up to the Republic of Ireland under-17 for the first time. He made his debut for the U17 national team, coming on as a 67th-minute substitute, in a 3–1 win against Malta U17 on 25 September 2010. Garmston then scored his first goals for the Republic of Ireland under-17, in a 4–1 win against Latvia U17 on 28 March 2011. Garmston made seven appearances and scoring two times for the U17 national team.

In August 2011, Garmston was called up by Republic of Ireland under-19 squad for the first time and made his debut for the U19 national team, coming on as a 64th-minute substitute, in a 3–0 loss against Serbia U19. The next two years saw the player make ten more appearances for the Republic of Ireland under-19.

In May 2014, Garmston was called up by the Republic of Ireland U21 squad. He made his debut for U21 national team, playing 45 minutes and set up a goal, in a 1–1 draw against Qatar U21 on 27 May 2014. Garmston made his second appearance for Republic of Ireland U21, playing 25 minutes, in a 2–0 loss against Germany U21 on 5 September 2014, in what turned out to be his last appearance for the U21 national football team.

== Personal life ==
Garmston was educated at The Cathedral School, Lichfield, and King Edward's School, Birmingham. In 2008, he was ranked as one of the top sprinters for his age in the UK and finished 2nd in the 200m at the English Schools Championships. Growing up, Garmston said he idolised Mark Kinsella.

Garmston's father, Michael, was Head Physiotherapist to the British Olympic athletics teams in 1992 Barcelona, 1996 and 2000. Garmston's mother, Sonia Lannaman, won a bronze medal in the 4 x 100 metres relay at the 1980 Summer Olympics in Moscow, Russia. She also won gold in the 1978 Commonwealth Games individual 100m. Garmston talked about his parents' opinion on him becoming a footballer, saying: "I had a go at it, I was happy with that, but for me it's always been football, from a very young age. Athletics was just something that I wanted to try out and then go straight back into football. My mum didn't push me towards athletics at all. My mum and dad are always backing me, in whatever I do. But it was always going to be difficult to combine the two sports, and I am 100% focused on the football."

== Career statistics ==
As of match played 12 September 2017

Appearances and goals by club, season and competition
| Club | Season | League | | | FA Cup | | League Cup | | Other | | Total | |
| Club | Season | Division | Apps | Goals | Apps | Goals | Apps | Goals | Apps | Goals | Apps | Goals |
|---|---|---|---|---|---|---|---|---|---|---|---|---|
| West Bromwich Albion | 2012–13 | Premier League | 0 | 0 | 0 | 0 | 0 | 0 | 0 | 0 | 0 | 0 |
| Colchester United (loan) | 2012–13 | League One | 13 | 0 | 0 | 0 | 0 | 0 | 0 | 0 | 13 | 0 |
| Gillingham (loan) | 2014–15 | League One | 8 | 1 | 0 | 0 | 0 | 0 | 1 (Note: Appearances in the Football League Trophy) | 0 | 9 | 1 |
| Gillingham | 2015–16 | League One | 33 | 0 | 1 | 0 | 2 | 0 | 2 | 1 | 38 | 1 |
| Gillingham | 2016–17 | League One | 5 | 0 | 1 | 0 | 0 | 0 | 1 (Note: Appearance in the EFL Trophy) | 0 | 7 | 0 |
| Gillingham | 2017–18 | League One | 0 | 0 | 0 | 0 | 0 | 0 | 0 | 0 | 0 | 0 |
| Gillingham | Total | | 46 | 1 | 2 | 0 | 2 | 0 | 4 | 1 | 52 | 2 |
| Career total | | | 59 | 1 | 2 | 0 | 2 | 0 | 4 | 1 | 65 | 2 |
