= Noel Mbo =

Congolese footballer

Personal information
- Date of birth: 14 March 1999 (age 27)
- Place of birth: DR Congo
- Height: 1.85 m (6 ft 1 in)
- Position: Forward

Team information
- Current team: Guangxi Hengchen

Youth career
- Charlton Athletic
- 2015–2017: Gillingham

Senior career*
Years	Team	Apps	(Gls)
2017–2019	Gillingham	1	(0)
2017	→ Hampton & Richmond Borough (loan)	3	(0)
2017	→ Kingstonian (loan)	7	(1)
2018	→ Kingstonian (loan)	6	(1)
2019–2021	Helsingborg	18	(0)
2019	→ Eskilsminne (loan)	10	(4)
2022	Džiugas	16	(2)
2023–2024	Panevėžys	56	(10)
2024–2025	Hong Linh Ha Tinh	22	(4)
2025	Cong An Ho Chi Minh City	2	(0)
2025–2026	Kelantan TRW		
2026–	Guangxi Hengchen	0	(0)
- * Club domestic league appearances and goals as of 08:30, 4 September 2025 (UTC)

Noel Mbo (born 14 March 1999) is a Congolese professional footballer who plays as a striker for China League One club Guangxi Hengchen.

== Early and personal life ==
Mbo was born in the Democratic Republic of the Congo and moved to England as a child.

== Career ==
Mbo began his career with Charlton Athletic, before signing with Gillingham in October 2015. He turned professional for the 2017–18 season, spending time on loan at non-league clubs Hampton & Richmond Borough and Kingstonian.

He made his senior debut for Gillingham on 7 November 2017, in the Football League Trophy against Reading U21s, and he scored as Gillingham won 7–5.

He signed a new one-year contract with Gillingham in May 2018. In July 2018 he said he was looking forward to the 2018–19 season. He made his League debut on 26 December 2018.

In February 2019 Mbo went on trial with Swedish club Helsingborg. Later that month his contract with Gillingham was terminated by mutual consent. On 5 March 2019, Mbo signed a three-year deal with Helsingborg. He made his competitive debut for the club as a 67th-minute substitute in a 3-0 league loss to Östersund on 29 April 2019.

On 9 August 2019, Mbo joined Division 1 side Eskilsminne on loan for the rest of the season. Three days later, he scored on his debut after coming on as a substitute in a 3–1 win over Kristianstad.

On 16 December 2021 Helsingborg announced that Mbo was being released by the club upon the expiry of his contract.

He signed for Džiugas in July 2022. In January 2023, Mbo remained in Lithuania, joining Panevėžys on a two-year deal. On 25 August 2024, Mbo left the club by mutual agreement. Three days later, he joined V.League 1 club Hong Linh Ha Tinh on a two-year deal.

In August 2025, Mbo signed for V.League 1 fellow Cong An Ho Chi Minh City. In 2025 he signed for Kelantan The Real Warriors.

On 5 March 2026, Mbo joined China League One club Guangxi Hengchen.

== Career statistics ==
As of 4 July 2020

Appearances and goals by club, season and competition
Club	Season	League			FA Cup		League Cup		Other		Total	
Club	Season	Division	Apps	Goals	Apps	Goals	Apps	Goals	Apps	Goals	Apps	Goals
Gillingham	2017–18	League One	0	0	0	0	0	0	1	1	1	1
Gillingham	2018–19	League One	1	0	0	0	0	0	1	0	2	0
Gillingham	Total		1	0	0	0	0	0	2	1	3	1
Hampton & Richmond Borough (loan)	2017–18	National League South	3	0	0	0	0	0	0	0	3	0
Kingstonian (loan)	2017–18	Isthmian Premier	13	2	0	0	0	0	1	2	14	4
Helsingborg	2019	Allsvenskan	1	0	0	0	0	0	0	0	1	0
Helsingborg	2020	Allsvenskan	8	0	0	0	0	0	0	0	8	0
Helsingborg	Total		9	0	0	0	0	0	0	0	9	0
Eskilsminne (loan)	2019	Division 1	10	4	1	0	0	0	0	0	11	4
Career total			36	6	1	0	0	0	3	3	40	9
