= Conor Wilkinson =

Irish footballer (born 1995)

Personal information
- Full name: Conor Dominic Geoffrey Wilkinson
- Date of birth: 23 January 1995 (age 31)
- Place of birth: Croydon, England
- Height: 1.91 m (6 ft 3 in)
- Position: Striker

Team information
- Current team: Boreham Wood (on loan from Solihull Moors)
- Number: 14

Youth career
- 2010–2013: Millwall

Senior career*
Years	Team	Apps	(Gls)
2013–2017	Bolton Wanderers	13	(0)
2013	→ Chester (loan)	4	(1)
2014	→ Torquay United (loan)	3	(0)
2014	→ Oldham Athletic (loan)	6	(1)
2015	→ Oldham Athletic (loan)	11	(2)
2015–2016	→ Barnsley (loan)	8	(1)
2016	→ Newport County (loan)	12	(1)
2016	→ Portsmouth (loan)	1	(0)
2016–2017	→ Chesterfield (loan)	12	(4)
2017–2019	Gillingham	41	(3)
2018–2019	→ Dagenham & Redbridge (loan)	10	(6)
2019	Dagenham & Redbridge	13	(6)
2019–2021	Leyton Orient	68	(17)
2021–2023	Walsall	55	(13)
2023–2024	Motherwell	14	(3)
2024	Colchester United	8	(0)
2024–	Solihull Moors	56	(22)
2026–	→ Boreham Wood (loan)	1	(0)

International career
2011–2012	Republic of Ireland U17	6	(0)
2012	Republic of Ireland U19	2	(0)
2014–2016	Republic of Ireland U21	13	(2)
- * Club domestic league appearances and goals as of 14:49, 25 September 2026 (UTC)

Conor Dominic Geoffrey Wilkinson (born 23 January 1995) is a footballer plays as a striker for Boreham Wood, on loan from National League club Solihull Moors. Born in England, he has represented Ireland at youth level.

== Club career ==
=== Millwall ===
Wilkinson began his career at Millwall in 2010 and progressed through the ranks during his three-year stint at the club.

=== Bolton Wanderers ===
He left the club in the summer of 2013 to join fellow Championship side Bolton Wanderers on a three-year contract. He initially joined the reserve side and was in good scoring form. In October 2013 Wilkinson along with teammate Chris Lester joined new Conference side Chester on a month's long loan. He made his debut and scored against Aldershot Town, he also played the full 90 minutes. His second appearance for the non-league side against strugglers Hyde where he received first yellow card of his career and he was substituted as Chester won 2–1. He returned to Bolton after making a total of four league appearances and scoring one goal. He returned to the reserve side and his scoring form continued until February when he was loaned to League Two side Torquay United on an emergency one-month loan deal. He was named among the substitutes and made his professional debut a day later against high flying Chesterfield coming on as a 75th minute replacing Jayden Stockley.

Returning to Bolton, he scored three goals in Bolton's pre season for the 2014–15 season and made his competitive debut for Wanderers in their 3–2 League Cup victory over neighbours Bury on 12 August 2014, starting the game before being substituted for Craig Davies in the second half. He joined Oldham Athletic on loan for a month in September 2014, scoring once during his loan spell, in a 2–1 win for Oldham against Walsall.

In December 2014 Wilkinson signed a contract extension with Bolton until 2018. Later on that month he made his first league appearance for Bolton when coming on as a substitute for Craig Davies in a goalless draw at Reading. On 2 February 2015 he moved to Oldham, again on loan, for the duration of the season. His first-team debut came at the Macron Stadium in a 0–0 draw against Ipswich Town.

He joined Barnsley on loan in July 2015 for six months. He scored on his debut in a 3–1 defeat at Chesterfield on 8 August 2015.

On 21 January 2016 Wilkinson joined Newport County on an initial one-month loan which was subsequently extended a further month. He made his Newport debut in the starting line up versus Dagenham & Redbridge on 23 January 2016, scoring the second goal in the 2–2 draw.

On 23 March 2016, Wilkinson joined Portsmouth on loan until the end of the season.

On 31 August 2016, Wilkinson joined Chesterfield on loan until January.

=== Gillingham ===
On 29 June 2017, Wilkinson joined Gillingham on a two-year deal for an undisclosed fee.

=== Leyton Orient ===
On 17 June 2019, after scoring 12 league goals in 23 games for Dagenham & Redbridge in the previous season, Wilkinson joined newly promoted League Two side Leyton Orient for an undisclosed fee. Wilkinson was offered a new deal due to his contract expiring but chose to leave the club.

=== Walsall ===
Wilkinson joined EFL League Two side Walsall on a two-year deal on 1 July 2021.

=== Motherwell ===
On 4 July 2023, Motherwell announced the signing of Wilkinson to a two-year contract after his Walsall contract had ended the previous season.

=== Colchester United ===
On 3 January 2024, Wilkinson signed for Colchester United for an undisclosed fee.

On 15 August 2024, Colchester announced that Wilkinson had left the club after having his contract terminated by mutual consent.

=== Solihull Moors ===
On 16 August 2024, Wilkinson joined National League club Solihull Moors.

On 16 September 2026, he joined fellow National League club Boreham Wood on a three-month loan deal.

== International career ==
Wilkinson has been capped at Republic of Ireland U19 and U21 level.

== Career statistics ==
As of end of 2025–26 season

Appearances and goals by club, season and competition
Club	Season	League			National Cup		League Cup		Other		Total	
Club	Season	Division	Apps	Goals	Apps	Goals	Apps	Goals	Apps	Goals	Apps	Goals
Bolton Wanderers	2013–14	Championship	0	0	0	0	0	0	—		0	0
Bolton Wanderers	2014–15	Championship	4	0	1	0	2	0	—		7	0
Bolton Wanderers	2015–16	Championship	0	0	—		—		—		0	0
Bolton Wanderers	2016–17	League One	9	0	0	0	0	0	1 (Note: Appearances in the EFL Trophy)	0	10	0
Bolton Wanderers	Total		13	0	1	0	2	0	1	0	17	0
Chester (loan)	2013–14	Conference National	4	1	—		—		—		4	1
Torquay United (loan)	2013–14	League Two	3	0	—		—		—		3	0
Oldham Athletic (loan)	2014–15	League One	17	3	—		—		1 (Note: Appearances in the Football League Trophy)	0	18	3
Barnsley (loan)	2015–16	League One	8	1	1	0	2	0	1	0	12	1
Newport County (loan)	2015–16	League Two	12	1	—		—		—		12	1
Portsmouth (loan)	2015–16	League Two	1	0	—		—		—		1	0
Chesterfield (loan)	2016–17	League One	12	4	—		—		—		12	4
Gillingham	2017–18	League One	34	3	3	0	1	0	3	1	41	4
Gillingham	2018–19	League One	7	0	0	0	1	0	1	0	9	0
Gillingham	Total		98	13	4	0	4	0	6	1	112	14
Dagenham & Redbridge	2018–19	National League	23	12	—		—		1 (Note: Appearances in the FA Trophy)	0	24	12
Leyton Orient	2019–20	League Two	26	5	0	0	1	0	1	0	28	5
Leyton Orient	2020–21	League Two	42	12	1	0	1	1	2	2	46	15
Leyton Orient	Total		91	29	1	0	2	1	4	2	98	32
Walsall	2021–22	League Two	33	7	1	0	1	0	1	0	36	7
Walsall	2022–23	League Two	22	3	1	0	0	0	0	0	23	3
Walsall	Total		55	10	2	0	1	0	1	0	59	10
Motherwell	2023–24	SPL	14	3	5	1	-	-	0	0	19	4
Motherwell	Total		14	3	5	1	0	0	0	0	19	4
Colchester United	2023–24	League Two	8	0	0	0	0	0	0	0	8	0
	Total		8	0	0	0	0	0	0	0	8	0
Solihull Moors	2024–25	National league	30	13	4	2	—		1	0	35	15
Solihull Moors	2025–26	National League	25	9	0	0	—		2 (Note: Appearance(s) in National League Cup)	0	27	9
Solihull Moors	Total		55	22	4	2	0	0	3	0	62	24
Career total			334	77	17	3	9	1	15	3	375	84

== Honours ==
Bolton Wanderers

- EFL League One runner-up (promoted): 2016–17

Individual

- National League Player of the Month: December 2024
