= Tom Eaves =

English footballer (born 1992)

- Eaves with Gillingham in 2018

Personal information
- Full name: Thomas James Eaves
- Date of birth: 14 January 1992 (age 34)
- Place of birth: Liverpool, England
- Height: 6 ft 3 in (1.91 m)
- Position: Striker

Team information
- Current team: Gillingham
- Number: 39

Youth career
- –2007: Crewe Alexandra
- 2007–2009: Oldham Athletic

Senior career*
Years	Team	Apps	(Gls)
2009–2010	Oldham Athletic	15	(0)
2010–2016	Bolton Wanderers	4	(0)
2012–2013	→ Bristol Rovers (loan)	16	(7)
2013	→ Shrewsbury Town (loan)	10	(6)
2013	→ Rotherham United (loan)	8	(0)
2013–2014	→ Shrewsbury Town (loan)	25	(2)
2014–2015	→ Yeovil Town (loan)	5	(0)
2015	→ Bury (loan)	9	(1)
2016–2017	Yeovil Town	40	(4)
2017–2019	Gillingham	84	(38)
2019–2022	Hull City	97	(14)
2022–2024	Rotherham United	53	(6)
2024–2026	Northampton Town	54	(13)
2026–	Gillingham	4	(1)
- * Club domestic league appearances and goals as of 09:34, 21 October 2026 (UTC)

Thomas James Eaves (born 14 January 1992) is an English professional footballer who plays as a striker for Gillingham.

== Career ==
=== Oldham Athletic ===
Eaves was born in Liverpool, Merseyside. He joined Oldham Athletic's Centre of Excellence as a youth player at Under-15 age group having previously been at Crewe Alexandra.

He made his Football League debut on 23 January 2010 as a substitute during a 1–0 defeat to Millwall. He made 15 appearances in the 2009/10 season for Oldham, all of them as a substitute. Eaves' breakthrough in the first team soon earned him his first professional contract on a two-year contract. However, Manager Dave Penney claimed that Eaves rejected a new contract and dropped him from the first team unless he resolved his own future.

He scored a hat-trick in a pre-season friendly against Bolton Wanderers on 28 July 2010. Shortly after, Eaves' performance soon attracted from many clubs were keen to sign him. Manager Paul Dickov later confirmed that there were offers from clubs to sign Eaves.

=== Bolton Wanderers ===
He joined Bolton Wanderers on a three-year contract for an undisclosed fee on 12 August 2010.

Eaves joined the Bolton team on their pre-season tour of America preceding the 2011–12 season, but was injured. He didn't return from the injury until the following summer, although he made an appearance for the reserves in December 2011.

Eaves signed a new three-year contract with Bolton in January 2013. Having been sent on loan to Shrewsbury Town earlier in the season, he was recalled on 15 April 2013 and made his debut for the club a day later, coming on as a substitute for David Ngog in a 3–2 defeat against Leicester City.

At the end of the 2015–16 season, the club confirmed that he would be leaving when his contract expired at the end of June.

=== Loan spells ===
==== Bristol Rovers ====
On 27 September 2012, Eaves joined League Two Bristol Rovers on a three-month loan deal. After failing to score against Exeter City and Cheltenham Town, he scored his first league goal on 6 October as his loan side beat Northampton Town On 20 October 2012, Bristol Rovers beat local rivals Torquay United 3–2 at the Memorial Stadium, he scored 2 goals in this match. He added another goal to his tally in an away match against AFC Wimbledon on 23 October 2012, which Rovers lost 3–1. On 10 November 2012, he scored the match winner after having set up the two other goals against Chesterfield at the Memorial Stadium in a 3–2 victory. Eaves went on to make seventeen appearances and scoring seven times in all competitions before returning on 28 December 2012.

==== Shrewsbury Town ====
On 21 February 2013, Eaves joined Shrewsbury Town on an initial one-month loan deal. He made his debut against Stevenage on 23 February, and scored his first goal for the club in the following game on 26 February in a 2–1 loss at home to Doncaster Rovers. On 12 March 2013, he then later scored two against Milton Keynes Dons in a 3–2 win. Weeks later on 22 March 2013, Eaves' loan spell with the club was extended until the end of April. On 1 April, he scored his first senior hat-trick in a 3–0 win against Crawley Town. Weeks after scoring a hat-trick, Eaves was recalled by the club on 15 April 2013.

==== Rotherham United ====
On 21 September 2013, Eaves joined League One side Rotherham United on a three-month loan deal. He made his debut on the same day for The Millers in a 1–1 draw away at Walsall, coming on as a 72nd-minute substitute for Kieran Agard. He was recalled by his parent club on 25 November 2013 after making eight appearances for Rotherham United.

==== Shrewsbury Town ====
On 28 November 2013, Eaves returned on an emergency loan for Shrewsbury Town initially until 5 January 2014. He scored a goal on his second debut, in a 3–1 victory away at Stevenage two days later. His loan was later extended to the end of the 2013/14 season. Eaves then scored his second Shrewsbury Town goal on a late minutes, in a 1–1 draw against Brentford on 1 February 2014.

==== Yeovil Town ====
On 27 November 2014, Eaves joined League One side Yeovil Town on loan until 5 January 2015. Eaves made his Yeovil Town debut two days later, making his first start and playing 90 minutes, in a 2–0 loss against Preston North End. Eaves played seven matches for Yeovil without scoring a goal before returning to Bolton at the end of his loan spell.

==== Bury ====
Eaves joined League Two side Bury on loan until the end of the season. The same day, Eaves made his Bury debut, in a 1–0 loss against Mansfield Town. Eaves then scored his first Bury goal, in a 2–1 loss against Morecambe on 6 April 2015. After making nine appearances for the club, Eaves made his return to his parent club.

=== Yeovil Town ===
After his release from Bolton, on 1 July 2016, Eaves signed for League Two side Yeovil Town on a one-year deal. He scored his first goal for Yeovil in a 1–1 draw with Luton Town on 13 August 2016. At the end of the 2016–17 season, Eaves was released by Yeovil along with five other players.

=== Gillingham ===
Following his release from Yeovil, on 22 June 2017, Eaves signed for League One club Gillingham on a two-year deal. He made his debut for the club on the first day of the 2017–18 season in a 0–0 draw away to Doncaster Rovers. His first goals for the club came on 26 August 2017 when he scored a second half hat-trick in a 3–3 draw against Southend United. Eaves would end the 2017–18 season as the club's top goalscorer with 18 goals in all competitions.

Eaves repeated the feat in the following season, with a tally of 22 goals in all competitions. He received the club's Players' Player of the Year award and the Goal of the Season award for his effort away at Portsmouth in October 2018. The same goal was later voted by Gillingham fans as their 'goal of the decade'.

=== Hull City ===
Eaves was offered a new contract by Gillingham at the end of the 2018–19 season, but refused it and decided to leave upon the expiration of his contract, thus becoming a free agent. On 10 July 2019, he signed for Championship club Hull City on a free transfer, signing a three-year contract. Eaves made his first appearance for the club in the first match of the 2019–20 season in the 2–1 away defeat to Swansea City, when he came off the bench to replace Nouha Dicko. He scored his first goal for the club on 1 October 2019, the only goal, in the home match against Sheffield Wednesday, after coming on as a substitute for Josh Magennis. Eaves was released at the end of the 2021–22 season.

=== Rotherham United (second spell) ===
Following his departure from Hull, Eaves rejoined former club Rotherham.

=== Northampton Town ===
On 12 July 2024, Eaves joined League One side Northampton Town on an initial two-year deal. He made his debut for the Cobblers in a 4-2 home loss against one of his former sides, Bolton Wanderers, coming on in the 62nd minute. He went on to score his first goal for Northampton that same evening, scoring in the 90th minute to make the score 4-1.

In his second season at the club, Eaves finished top scorer for the Cobblers, scoring 10 goals in all competitions. Northampton were relegated to League Two at the end of the season, and Eaves was released from the club following the end of his contract.

=== Gillingham (second spell) ===
In September 2026, Eaves re-joined Gillingham on a one-year contract. Eaves' first appearance back in a Gillingham shirt came 4 days after his announcement, as he came on as a substitute in a 0-0 home draw with Newport County. He scored his first goal back for Gillingham a week later, as he converted an 89th minute penalty to put the Gills 4-1 up away at one of his former teams Rotherham United.

== Career statistics ==
As of 21 October 2026

Club statistics
Club	Season	League			FA Cup		League Cup		Other		Total	
Club	Season	Division	Apps	Goals	Apps	Goals	Apps	Goals	Apps	Goals	Apps	Goals
Oldham Athletic	2009–10	League One	15	0	0	0	0	0	0	0	15	0
Bolton Wanderers	2010–11	Premier League	0	0	0	0	0	0	—		0	0
Bolton Wanderers	2011–12	Premier League	0	0	0	0	0	0	—		0	0
Bolton Wanderers	2012–13	Championship	3	0	0	0	0	0	—		3	0
Bolton Wanderers	2013–14	Championship	0	0	0	0	1	0	—		1	0
Bolton Wanderers	2014–15	Championship	1	0	0	0	0	0	—		1	0
Bolton Wanderers	2015–16	Championship	0	0	0	0	0	0	—		0	0
Bolton Wanderers	Total		4	0	0	0	1	0	—		5	0
Bristol Rovers (loan)	2012–13	League Two	16	7	1	0	—		—		17	7
Shrewsbury Town (loan)	2012–13	League One	10	6	—		—		—		10	6
Shrewsbury Town (loan)	2013–14	League One	25	2	—		—		—		25	2
Shrewsbury Town (loan)	Total		35	8	0	0	0	0	0	0	35	8
Rotherham United (loan)	2013–14	League One	8	0	0	0	0	0	1 (Note: Appearance in Football League Trophy)	1	9	1
Yeovil Town (loan)	2014–15	League One	5	0	2	0	—		—		7	0
Bury (loan)	2014–15	League Two	9	1	—		—		—		9	1
Yeovil Town	2016–17	League Two	40	4	2	0	2	0	4 (Note: Appearance(s) in EFL Trophy)	3	48	7
Gillingham	2017–18	League One	41	17	3	1	1	0	2	0	47	18
Gillingham	2018–19	League One	43	21	5	1	1	0	1	0	50	22
Gillingham	Total		84	38	8	2	2	0	3	0	97	40
Hull City	2019–20	Championship	40	5	2	3	2	0	0	0	44	8
Hull City	2020–21	League One	26	4	1	1	1	0	3	0	31	5
Hull City	2021–22	Championship	31	5	1	0	1	0	0	0	33	5
Hull City	Total		97	14	4	4	4	0	3	0	108	18
Rotherham United	2022–23	Championship	20	0	0	0	1	0	—		21	0
Rotherham United	2023–24	Championship	33	6	1	0	1	0	—		35	6
Rotherham United	Total		53	6	1	0	2	0	—		56	6
Northampton Town	2024–25	League One	23	5	0	0	0	0	1	0	24	5
Northampton Town	2025–26	League One	33	8	1	0	0	0	4	2	38	10
Northampton Town	Total		47	13	1	0	0	0	5	2	52	15
Gillingham	2026–27	League Two	4	1	0	0	—		1	1	5	2
Career total			422	92	19	6	11	0	17	7	469	105

== Honours ==
Hull City

- EFL League One: 2020–21
