= Darren Oldaker =

English footballer (born 1999)

Personal information
- Full name: Darren Joseph Norman Oldaker
- Date of birth: 4 January 1999 (age 27)
- Place of birth: Guildford, England
- Height: 1.79 m (5 ft 10 in)
- Position: Defensive midfielder

Team information
- Current team: Southend United
- Number: 8

Youth career
- –2015: Queens Park Rangers
- 2015–2016: Gillingham

Senior career*
Years	Team	Apps	(Gls)
2016–2019	Gillingham	21	(0)
2018	→ Hythe Town (loan)	14	(5)
2019	Billericay Town	2	(0)
2019	Westfield	2	(0)
2020–2021	Hythe Town	13	(1)
2021	Welling United	3	(0)
2021	Hythe Town	11	(0)
2021–2022	Dorking Wanderers	24	(4)
2022–2025	Chesterfield	96	(7)
2025–2026	Swindon Town	39	(1)
2026–	Southend United	9	(1)
- * Club domestic league appearances and goals as of 24 September 2026 (UTC)

Darren Joseph Norman Oldaker (born 4 January 1999) is an English professional footballer who plays as a defensive midfielder for National League club Southend United.

== Career ==
Oldaker began his career in the Queens Park Rangers youth team, but was ready to quit the game when Dennis Wise recommended him to Gillingham. He had a trial at the club and was soon signed onto scholarship forms. He signed professional forms in May 2016. He made his League One debut on 20 August 2016, coming on as a 75th-minute substitute for Emmanuel Osadebe in a 5–0 defeat to Scunthorpe United at Glanford Park. He scored on his first start for the "Gills" ten days later, in a 2–1 defeat to Luton Town in an EFL Trophy match at Priestfield Stadium.

In February 2017 he signed on loan for Isthmian League South Division team Hythe Town, making his debut for the side in a 2–1 victory over Herne Bay on 6 February 2017.

On 21 August 2019, it was announced that Oldaker had left Gillingham after the club, along with the player, decided to terminate his contract by mutual consent.

The following month, Oldaker signed on non-contract terms for National League South side Billericay Town. After just three appearances for Billericay and two for Westfield, he signed for former club Hythe Town on 24 January 2020.

On 5 February 2021, Oldaker signed for National League South side Welling United. He made three appearances for The Wings before the COVID-19 pandemic curtailed the remainder of the campaign. On 28 May 2021, he subsequently agreed to return to Hythe Town, despite signing on for another campaign with Welling prior to the announcement.

On 23 November 2021, after featuring heavily for Hythe, Oldaker made his return to the National League South to join Surrey-based Dorking Wanderers.

Having achieved promotion through the National League South play-offs, Oldaker signed for fellow National League club Chesterfield.

On 23 May 2025, Oldaker agreed to join League Two side Swindon Town on a two-year contract from 1 July.

On 18 June 2026, Oldaker returned to the National League, signing for Southend United on a two-year deal for an undisclosed fee.

== Career statistics ==
As of 20 January 2026

Club	Season	League			FA Cup		League Cup		Other		Total	
Club	Season	Division	Apps	Goals	Apps	Goals	Apps	Goals	Apps	Goals	Apps	Goals
Gillingham	2015–16	League One	0	0	0	0	0	0	0	0	0	0
Gillingham	2016–17	League One	5	0	0	0	1	0	2 (Note: Appearances in the EFL Trophy)	2	8	2
Gillingham	2017–18	League One	3	0	0	0	1	0	4	2	8	2
Gillingham	2018–19	League One	13	0	3	1	0	0	1	0	17	1
Gillingham	2019–20	League One	0	0	0	0	0	0	0	0	0	0
Gillingham	Total		21	0	3	1	2	0	7	4	33	4
Hythe Town (loan)	2017–18	Isthmian League Division One South	14	5	—		—		—		14	5
Billericay Town	2019–20	National League South	2	0	1	0	—		0	0	3	0
Westfield	2019–20	Isthmian League South Central Division	2	0	—		—		—		2	0
Hythe Town	2019–20	Isthmian League South East Division	7	0	—		—		—		7	0
Hythe Town	2020–21	Isthmian League South East Division	6	1	1	0	—		3 (Note: Appearances in the FA Trophy)	0	10	1
Hythe Town	Total		13	1	1	0	—		3	0	17	1
Welling United	2020–21	National League South	3	0	—		—		—		3	0
Hythe Town	2021–22	Isthmian League South East Division	11	0	4	0	—		1	0	16	0
Dorking Wanderers	2021–22	National League South	24	4	—		—		1 (Note: Appearance in the National League South play-offs)	0	25	4
Chesterfield	2022–23	National League	39	3	5	0	—		2 (Note: Appearance(s) in National League play-offs)	1	46	4
Chesterfield	2023–24	National League	25	1	4	1	—		0	0	29	2
Chesterfield	2024–25	League Two	32	3	2	0	1	0	5	1	40	4
Chesterfield	Total		96	7	11	1	1	0	7	2	115	10
Swindon Town	2025–26	League Two	25	1	2	1	1	0	3	0	31	2
Career total			201	18	22	3	4	0	22	6	259	27

== Honours ==
Chesterfield

- National League: 2023–24
