= Josh Parker =

English footballer (born 1990)

Personal information
- Full name: Joshua Kevin Stanley Parker
- Date of birth: 1 December 1990 (age 35)
- Place of birth: Slough, England
- Height: 5 ft 11 in (1.80 m)
- Position: Striker

Team information
- Current team: Farnborough
- Number: 23

Youth career
- Queens Park Rangers

Senior career*
Years	Team	Apps	(Gls)
2009–2011	Queens Park Rangers	5	(0)
2010	→ AFC Wimbledon (loan)	2	(0)
2010	→ Northampton Town (loan)	3	(0)
2010	→ Wycombe Wanderers (loan)	1	(0)
2011–2012	Oldham Athletic	13	(0)
2012	→ Dagenham & Redbridge (loan)	8	(0)
2012–2013	Oxford United	15	(0)
2013–2015	Domžale	42	(14)
2015–2016	Red Star Belgrade	12	(4)
2015	→ Aberdeen (loan)	7	(0)
2017	Wealdstone	0	(0)
2017–2019	Gillingham	79	(16)
2019	Charlton Athletic	10	(0)
2019–2021	Wycombe Wanderers	16	(0)
2021	Burton Albion	6	(0)
2022	Risborough Rangers	0	(0)
2022–2026	Oxford City	153	(42)
2026–	Farnborough	1	(0)

International career^{‡}
2010–	Antigua and Barbuda	44	(6)
- * Club domestic league appearances and goals as of 21:57, 22 October 2026 (UTC) ‡ National team caps and goals as of 17:10, 17 June 2026 (UTC)

Joshua Kevin Stanley Parker (born 1 December 1990) is a professional footballer who plays as a striker for National League South club Farnborough and the Antigua and Barbuda national team. Besides England, he has played in Scotland, Slovenia, and Serbia.

== Club career ==
=== Queens Park Rangers ===
Parker started his career at Queens Park Rangers (QPR). In January 2010 he joined Conference National club AFC Wimbledon on loan. He made just two substitute appearances for the club. On 10 April 2010 he made his Championship debut, replacing Adel Taarabt as a last-minute substitute, in a 2–0 win over Crystal Palace at Selhurst Park. He got his first start two weeks later in a 1–0 win at Barnsley. At the end of the season, manager Neil Warnock offered the youngster a new one-year deal. In October 2010, he joined League Two club Northampton Town on a month-long loan. He made only three appearances for the club and returned to QPR a week before the end of his contract. Parker then joined Wycombe Wanderers on 23 November 2010 on a three-month loan deal and made his debut on the same night against Torquay United, coming on as a second-half substitute. His loan spell was cut short when he suffered a stress fracture in his left foot while on international duty with Antigua and Barbuda. He returned to QPR but failed to make another appearance and was released at the end of the season following their promotion to the Premier League.

=== Oldham Athletic ===
Parker signed a one-year contract at Oldham Athletic on 5 August 2011 following a successful trial period and made his competitive club debut on the first day of the 2011–12 season, as a substitute in the Football League match against Sheffield United. On 8 March 2012, Parker joined League Two side Dagenham & Redbridge on loan.

He was released by Oldham at the end of the 2011–12 season, along with eight other players.

=== Oxford United ===
In December 2012 he signed on non-contract terms for Oxford United. He was released by the club in May 2013 after 15 league appearances without a goal.

=== Domžale and Red Star Belgrade ===
He signed with Slovenian side Domžale in June 2013. After a year and a half in the Slovenian First League, he moved to Serbian SuperLiga side Red Star Belgrade. On 8 January 2015 he signed a two-year contract with Red Star.

On 20 August 2015, he signed a short-term loan deal with Aberdeen until January 2016.

=== Gillingham ===
In January 2017 he joined Wealdstone of the National League South, but just two weeks later signed for League One side Gillingham until the end of the 2016–17 season. He scored in his first appearance for the side in a friendly against Belgian side Patro Eisden Maasmechelen and again on his full debut against Port Vale in the league, coming on as a substitute to score a 95th-minute equaliser. At the end of the season his initial short-term contract was extended for a further two years.

=== Charlton Athletic ===
Josh Parker joined Charlton Athletic as a late deadline day transfer, on a six-month contract.

He was released by Charlton at the end of the 2018–19 season.

=== Wycombe Wanderers ===
Parker signed for Wycombe Wanderers on 1 August 2019. He scored his first goal for Wycombe when he scored in an EFL Trophy tie against Milton Keynes Dons on 12 November 2019.

=== Burton Albion ===
On 15 January 2021, Parker joined Burton Albion on a one-and-a-half-year deal.

On 31 August 2021, it was announced that Parker had left Burton Albion by mutual consent.

=== Oxford City ===
After appearing for Risborough Rangers on a non-contract basis, Parker signed for National League South side Oxford City on 12 September 2022, making his debut on the same day in a 1–0 league defeat to Chelmsford City. Having scored five goals across the month, Parker won the league's Player of the Month award for January 2023.

=== Farnborough ===
On 7 July 2026, Parker agreed to join Farnborough following his departure from Oxford City.

== International career ==
Parker is eligible to represent Antigua and Barbuda. In November 2010, he received a call-up and accepted an invitation along with his former QPR teammate Mikele Leigertwood to play for the national team in the Caribbean Championship qualifiers being hosted in St. John's, Antigua and Barbuda on 10–14 November. Parker won his first cap in a 2–1 victory over Suriname on 10 November 2010, playing the full 90 minutes. He was part of Antigua and Barbuda team at the 2010 and 2014 Caribbean Cup. He was made captain of the side in 2015.

== Personal life ==
In March 2016, he was a contestant on Channel 4's Couples Come Dine with Me (Season 3, Episode 33) which was filmed in Aberdeen during his time on loan.

== Career statistics ==
=== Club ===
As of match played 17 October 2026

Appearances and goals by club, season and competition
Club	Season	League			National cup		League cup		Other		Total	
Club	Season	Division	Apps	Goals	Apps	Goals	Apps	Goals	Apps	Goals	Apps	Goals
Queens Park Rangers	2009–10	Championship	4	0	0	0	0	0	—		4	0
Queens Park Rangers	2010–11	Championship	1	0	0	0	1	0	—		2	0
Queens Park Rangers	Total		5	0	0	0	1	0	—		6	0
AFC Wimbledon (loan)	2009–10	Conference Premier	2	0	0	0	—		1 (Note: Appearance in FA Trophy)	0	3	0
Northampton Town (loan)	2010–11	League Two	3	0	0	0	—		0	0	3	0
Wycombe Wanderers (loan)	2010–11	League Two	1	0	0	0	—		0	0	1	0
Oldham Athletic	2011–12	League One	13	0	2	0	1	0	2 (Note: Appearances in Football League Trophy)	0	18	0
Dagenham & Redbridge (loan)	2011–12	League Two	8	0	—		—		—		8	0
Oxford United	2012–13	League Two	15	0	0	0	0	0	1	0	16	0
Domžale	2013–14	Slovenian PrvaLiga	25	11	3	1	—		2 (Note: Appearances in Europa League)	0	30	12
Domžale	2014–15	Slovenian PrvaLiga	17	3	3	2	—		—		20	5
Domžale	Total		42	14	6	3	—		2	0	50	17
Red Star Belgrade	2014–15	Serbian SuperLiga	9	2	0	0	—		—		9	2
Red Star Belgrade	2015–16	Serbian SuperLiga	3	2	0	0	—		2	0	5	2
Red Star Belgrade	Total		12	4	0	0	—		2	0	14	4
Aberdeen (loan)	2015–16	Scottish Premiership	7	0	0	0	1	0	0	0	8	0
Wealdstone	2016–17	National League South	0	0	0	0	—		0	0	0	0
Gillingham	2016–17	League One	16	2	0	0	0	0	0	0	16	2
Gillingham	2017–18	League One	42	10	3	1	1	0	3 (Note: Appearances in EFL Trophy)	1	49	12
Gillingham	2018–19	League One	21	4	2	0	1	0	0	0	24	4
Gillingham	Total		79	16	5	1	2	0	3	1	89	18
Charlton Athletic	2018–19	League One	10	0	—		—		3 (Note: Three appearances in the League One play-offs)	0	13	0
Wycombe Wanderers	2019–20	League One	13	0	1	0	1	0	3	1	18	1
Wycombe Wanderers	2020–21	Championship	3	0	0	0	1	0	—		4	0
Wycombe Wanderers	Total		16	0	1	0	2	0	3	1	22	1
Burton Albion	2020–21	League One	6	0	—		—		—		6	0
Risborough Rangers	2021–22	Spartan South Midlands League Premier Division	0	0	—		—		1 (Note: One appearances in the Spartan South Midlands League Premier Division Cup)	0	1	0
Oxford City	2022–23	National League South	35	18	2	2	—		2 (Note: Two appearances in the National League South play-offs)	1	39	21
Oxford City	2023–24	National League	39	14	0	0	—		1 (Note: One appearance in the FA Trophy)	0	40	14
Oxford City	2024–25	National League North	39	5	0	0	—		5 (Note: Five appearances in the FA Trophy)	3	44	8
Oxford City	2025–26	National League North	40	5	0	0	—		1 (Note: One appearance in the FA Trophy)	0	41	5
Oxford City	Total		153	42	2	2	—		9	4	164	48
Farnborough	2026–27	National League South	1	0	0	0	—		0	0	1	0
Career total			373	76	16	6	7	0	27	6	423	88

=== International ===
Scores and results list Antigua and Barbuda's goal tally first.

No.	Date	Venue	Opponent	Score	Result	Competition
1	8 October 2014	Ato Boldon Stadium, Couva	Saint Lucia	2–1	2–1	2014 Caribbean Cup qualification
2	14 June 2015	Sir Vivian Richards Stadium, North Sound	Saint Lucia	1–0	4–1	2018 FIFA World Cup qualification
3	14 June 2015	Sir Vivian Richards Stadium, North Sound	Saint Lucia	3–1	4–1	2018 FIFA World Cup qualification
4	23 March 2016	Sir Vivian Richards Stadium, North Sound	Aruba	1–0	2–1	2017 Caribbean Cup qualification
5	21 March 2018	Sir Vivian Richards Stadium, North Sound	Bermuda	2–1	3–2	Friendly
6	17 October 2023	ABFA Technical Center, Piggots	Bahamas	1–1	2–2	2023–24 CONCACAF Nations League B

== Honours ==
Charlton Athletic

- EFL League One play-offs: 2019

Wycombe Wanderers

- EFL League One play-offs: 2020

Oxford City

- National League South play-offs: 2023

Individual

- National League South Player of the Month: January 2023
