= Billy Bingham (footballer, born 1990) =

English footballer

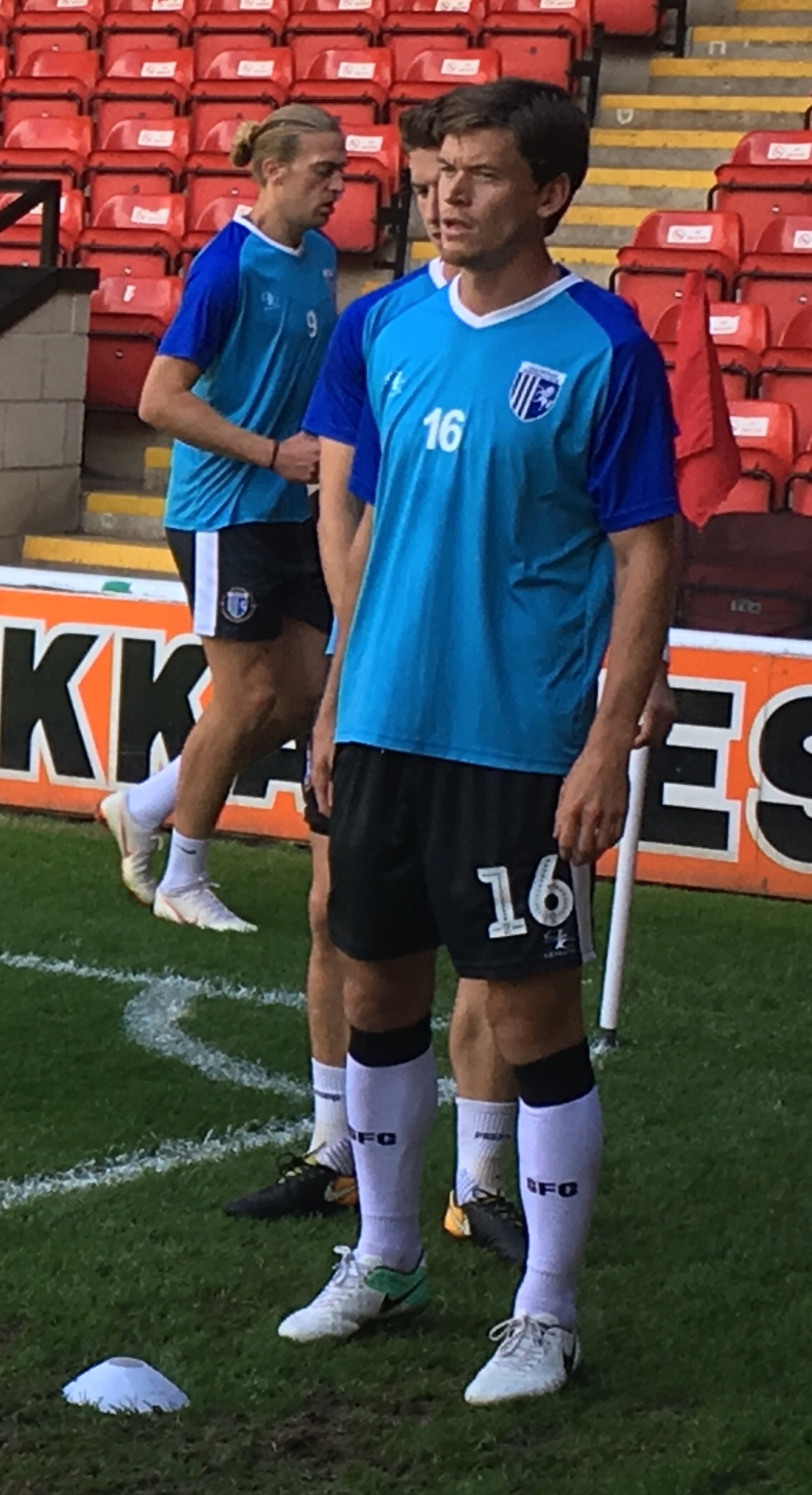

Personal information
- Full name: Billy Christopher Bingham
- Date of birth: 15 July 1990 (age 36)
- Place of birth: Welling, England
- Height: 6 ft 1 in (1.85 m)
- Position: Midfielder

Youth career
- 2006–2008: Crystal Palace

Senior career*
Years	Team	Apps	(Gls)
2008–2009	Crystal Palace	0	(0)
2009–2015	Dagenham & Redbridge	117	(8)
2009	→ Sutton United (loan)	1	(0)
2009	→ Grays Athletic (loan)	5	(0)
2015–2017	Crewe Alexandra	51	(0)
2017–2019	Gillingham	30	(0)
2019–2023	Bromley	129	(6)
2023–2024	Faversham Town	32	(1)
Total		364	(15)
- * Club domestic league appearances and goals as of 22:10, 3 May 2025 (UTC)

Billy Christopher Bingham (born 15 July 1990) is an English former professional footballer who played as a midfielder. He made his first senior appearance playing for Dagenham & Redbridge.

== Career ==
Bingham started his career as a youth player at Crystal Palace, starting a two-year scholarship in the summer of 2006. Upon its completion in April 2009, he signed a six-month deal on a non-contractual basis.

=== Dagenham & Redbridge ===
In January 2009 when his contract expired, Bingham joined Football League Two side Dagenham & Redbridge on trial. He was immediately loaned out to Isthmian League Premier Division side Sutton United along with Jacob Erskine, making his debut in a 0–0 draw with Canvey Island. His only other appearance for the club came in a 3–2 defeat to Horsham in the Isthmian League Cup.

In February 2009, he signed an eighteen-month contract by Dagenham after impressing on trial. He made his professional debut for the Daggers in August 2009, coming on as a last minute substitute for Jon Nurse in a 3–0 home win over Lincoln City.

At the start of November 2009 after impressing in his first two appearances for the club, he signed a new two-year contract extension until 2012. Later in the month he signed for Conference Premier side Grays Athletic on a one-month loan. He returned to Dagenham in December having made six appearances in all competitions.

The Daggers were promoted at the end of the campaign beating Rotherham United in the 2010 Football League Two play-off final, however, he failed to make any more appearances. In the 2010–11 season Bingham again failed to make an impact after suffering a medial ligament injury, only making six appearances as the Daggers were relegated in their maiden season in Football League One.

He scored his first senior goal in Dagenham's 2–1 victory over Gillingham in December 2011, scoring an equalising volley. Bingham established himself at the club during the 2011–12 season making 32 appearances despite having a few injury setbacks.

His thirty-yard strike in the 1–1 draw with Crawley Town in April 2012 was voted the club's goal of the season and also secured the club's place in League Two. He was rewarded in July 2012 with a new three-year contract. He started the 2012–13 season as a regular. In October, he was brought back into the starting line-up and scored upon his return in a 3–0 win over Wycombe Wanderers.

In November 2013, he suffered a medial knee ligament injury in a 1–1 draw with AFC Wimbledon, similar to the injury he picked up on his left knee in 2010. He made his return in February against Rochdale after two months on the sidelines.

=== Crewe Alexandra ===
On 6 July 2015 Bingham joined Crewe Alexandra after rejecting offers of a new contract with Dagenham. He scored his first and only goal for Crewe in a 4–3 EFL Cup loss against Blackburn Rovers on 23 August 2016. On 9 May 2017, Crewe announced that Bingham had been released by the club. Crewe manager David Artell noted that he had wanted Bingham to remain at the club but that he "wanted to move closer to home".

=== Gillingham ===
On 18 July 2017 he signed for League One side Gillingham on a two-year deal. He was released by Gillingham at the end of the 2018–19 season.

=== Bromley ===
In May 2019, Bingham signed for National League club Bromley.

=== Faversham Town ===
In September 2023, Bingham signed for SCEFL Premier Division club Faversham Town. Following defeat in the play-offs, he departed the club at the end of the 2023–24 season.

== Coaching career ==
On 3 May 2025, Bingham was appointed assistant manager of recently relegated Isthmian League Premier Division side Welling United. He departed the club in August 2025, prior to the commencement of the 2025–26 season.

== Career statistics ==
As of end of 2022–23 season

Appearances and goals by club, season and competition
Club	Season	League			FA Cup		League Cup		Other		Total	
Club	Season	Division	Apps	Goals	Apps	Goals	Apps	Goals	Apps	Goals	Apps	Goals
Crystal Palace	2008–09	Championship	0	0	0	0	0	0	—		0	0
Dagenham & Redbridge	2008–09	League Two	0	0	—		—		—		0	0
Dagenham & Redbridge	2009–10	League Two	2	0	0	0	0	0	0	0	2	0
Dagenham & Redbridge	2010–11	League One	6	0	0	0	0	0	0	0	6	0
Dagenham & Redbridge	2011–12	League Two	27	2	3	0	0	0	2 (Note: Appearances in Football League Trophy)	0	32	2
Dagenham & Redbridge	2012–13	League Two	18	2	0	0	1	0	1	0	20	2
Dagenham & Redbridge	2013–14	League Two	30	0	1	0	0	0	3	0	34	0
Dagenham & Redbridge	2014–15	League Two	34	4	2	0	0	0	1	0	37	4
Dagenham & Redbridge	Total		117	8	6	0	1	0	7	0	131	8
Sutton United (loan)	2008–09	IL Premier Division	1	0	—		—		1 (Note: Appearance in Isthmian League Cup)	0	2	0
Grays Athletic (loan)	2009–10	Conference Premier	5	0	—		—		1 (Note: Appearance in FA Trophy)	0	6	0
Crewe Alexandra	2015–16	League One	21	0	0	0	1	0	0	0	22	0
Crewe Alexandra	2016–17	League Two	30	0	0	0	2	1	1 (Note: Appearance in the EFL Trophy)	0	33	1
Crewe Alexandra	Total		51	0	0	0	3	1	1	0	55	1
Gillingham	2017–18	League One	9	0	0	0	0	0	1	0	10	0
Gillingham	2018–19	League One	21	0	2	0	0	0	1	0	24	0
Gillingham	Total		30	0	2	0	0	0	2	0	34	0
Bromley	2019–20	National League	31	3	2	0	—		1	0	34	3
Bromley	2020–21	National League	28	0	1	0	—		3 (Note: Two appearances in the FA Trophy, one in National League play-offs)	0	32	0
Bromley	2021–22	National League	38	2	1	0	—		4	0	43	2
Bromley	2022–23	National League	28	1	1	0	—		1 (Note: Appearance(s) in National League play-offs)	0	30	1
Bromley	2023–24	National League	4	0	0	0	—		0	0	4	0
Bromley	Total		129	6	5	0	—		9	0	143	6
Career total			332	14	13	0	4	1	21	0	370	15

== Honours ==
Dagenham & Redbridge

- Football League Two play-offs: 2010

Bromley

- FA Trophy: 2021–22
