= Greg Cundle =

English footballer (born 1997)

Personal information
- Full name: Gregory Vincent Cundle
- Date of birth: 20 March 1997 (age 29)
- Place of birth: Bromley, England
- Height: 1.82 m (5 ft 11 1/2 in)
- Position: Forward

Team information
- Current team: Ramsgate

Youth career
- –2015: Gillingham

Senior career*
Years	Team	Apps	(Gls)
2015–2018	Gillingham	8	(0)
2015–2016	→ East Grinstead Town (loan)	20	(11)
2016	→ Tilbury (loan)	7	(2)
2016	→ Margate (loan)	5	(1)
2016	→ Billericay Town (loan)	9	(4)
2016–2017	→ Bishop's Stortford (loan)	9	(3)
2018	→ Kingstonian (loan)	14	(2)
2018	Kingstonian	11	(1)
2018–2019	East Grinstead Town	25	(20)
2019	Concord Rangers	0	(0)
2020	Horsham	11	(3)
2020–2025	Ebbsfleet United	94	(16)
2024	→ Maidstone United	3	(0)
2025–2026	Welling United	13	(3)
2026–	Ramsgate	13	(3)
- * Club domestic league appearances and goals as of 06:35, 20 March 2026 (UTC)

Gregory Vincent Cundle (born 20 March 1997) is an English footballer who plays as a forward for Isthmian League Premier Division club Ramsgate.

Previously of Gillingham, he has spent time at non-league clubs East Grinstead Town, Tilbury, Margate, Billericay Town, Bishop's Stortford, Kingstonian, Horsham, Ebbsfleet United and Maidstone United.

== Club career ==
A graduate of Gillingham's youth setup, Cundle signed a one-year professional contract with the club in the summer of 2015. In the 2015–16 season, he had spells on loan at East Grinstead Town of the Isthmian League South Division, for whom he scored 11 goals in all competitions, 8 in the league; at Tilbury, for whom he scored twice in seven Isthmian League North Division matches in February 2016; and at Margate, for whom he scored once in five National League South matches in March. The goal came on his first appearance, in a 3–1 defeat against Maidenhead United.

After a loan deal with Billericay Town from 31 August to 28 October 2016 during which he scored four times, he joined Bishop's Stortford, again on loan, on 22 December. He was recalled by Gillingham in early March 2017, and made his English Football League debut on 18 March in a 4–1 defeat away to Rochdale in League One.

In May 2017, he accepted Gillingham's offer of a one-year contract extension. On 7 November 2017 he scored his first goal for Gillingham in the Football League Trophy against Reading U21s.

Following his release from Gillingham, he enjoyed spells with Kingstonian and East Grinstead Town before a move to National League South side, Concord Rangers in May 2019.

On 2 January 2020, Cundle moved to Horsham.

On 7 September 2020, Cundle moved to National League South side Ebbsfleet United.

In November 2024, Cundle joined National League South side Maidstone United on an initial one-month loan deal. He departed Ebbsfleet United at the end of the 2024–25 season.

On 5 July 2025, Cundle joined Isthmian League Premier Division side Welling United. On 1 January 2026, he departed the club to allow him to join Ramsgate, reuniting with former teammate Lee Martin.

== Career statistics ==
As of match played 20 March 2026

Appearances and goals by club, season and competition
Club	Season	League			FA Cup		League Cup		Other		Total	
Club	Season	Division	Apps	Goals	Apps	Goals	Apps	Goals	Apps	Goals	Apps	Goals
Gillingham	2015–16	League One	0	0	0	0	0	0	0	0	0	0
Gillingham	2016–17	League One	2	0	0	0	0	0	1 (Note: Appearance(s) in EFL Trophy)	0	3	0
Gillingham	2017–18	League One	6	0	0	0	1	0	3	1	10	1
Gillingham	Total		8	0	0	0	1	0	4	1	13	1
Tilbury (loan)	2015–16	Isthmian League Division One North	7	2	—		—		—		7	2
Margate (loan)	2015–16	National League South	5	1	—		—		—		5	1
Bishop's Stortford (loan)	2016–17	National League South	7	2	—		—		—		7	2
Kingstonian (loan)	2017–18	Isthmian League Premier Division	14	2	—		—		—		14	2
Kingstonian	2018–19	Isthmian League Premier Division	11	1	1	0	—		3 (Note: One appearance in Alan Turvey Trophy, one in FA Trophy)	0	15	1
East Grinstead Town	2018–19	Isthmian League South East Division	25	20	—		—		—		25	20
Concord Rangers	2019–20	National League South	0	0	0	0	—		0	0	0	0
Horsham	2019–20	Isthmian League Premier Division	11	3	0	0	—		2 (Note: Appearance(s) in Alan Turvey Trophy)	0	13	3
Ebbsfleet United	2020–21	National League South	2	0	1	0	—		1 (Note: Appearance(s) in FA Trophy)	0	4	0
Ebbsfleet United	2021–22	National League South	21	3	4	0	—		0	0	25	3
Ebbsfleet United	2022–23	National League South	41	11	4	1	—		0	0	45	12
Ebbsfleet United	2023–24	National League	20	2	0	0	—		1	1	21	3
Ebbsfleet United	2024–25	National League	10	0	0	0	—		2 (Note: Appearance(s) in National League Cup)	0	12	0
Ebbsfleet United	Total		94	16	9	1	0	0	4	1	107	18
Maidstone United (loan)	2024–25	National League South	3	0	0	0	—		0	0	3	0
Welling United	2025–26	Isthmian League Premier Division	13	3	0	0	—		0	0	13	3
Ramsgate	2025–26	Isthmian League Premier Division	13	3	0	0	0	0	2 (Note: Two appearances and two goals in the Velocity Cup)	2	15	5
Career total			211	53	10	1	1	0	13	2	237	58

== Honours ==
Ebbsfleet United

- National League South: 2022–23
