= Navid Nasseri =

Iranian-English footballer

Personal information
- Full name: Navid Nasseri
- Date of birth: 26 July 1996 (age 30)
- Place of birth: Manchester, England
- Height: 1.74 m (5 ft 9 in)
- Positions: Midfielder; left winger

Youth career
- 2008–2012: Manchester United
- 2012: Crewe Alexandra
- 2012: Blackburn Rovers
- 2013–2014: Bury
- 2014–2016: Birmingham City

Senior career*
Years	Team	Apps	(Gls)
2016–2017	Macclesfield Town	0	(0)
2017	Syrianska	25	(2)
2018–2019	Gillingham	8	(1)
2019–2020	Glentoran	20	(6)
2020–2021	Linfield	26	(2)
2021–2022	Larne	27	(4)
2023	Macclesfield	0	(0)
2024–2025	Stalybridge Celtic	16	(0)

International career
- Iran U20
- * Club domestic league appearances and goals as of 1 February 2025

Navid Nasseri (Persian: نوید ناصری; born 26 July 1996) is a professional footballer. Born in England, he has represented Iran at youth level.

== Club career ==
Nasseri played for the Manchester United Academy until the age of 16. He subsequently had stints with the academies of Crewe Alexandra, Blackburn Rovers and Bury.

Nasseri joined Birmingham City on a one-year deal in July 2014 and was assigned to the development squad. After making eight appearances for the side, his contract was terminated by mutual consent.

On 28 October 2016, Nasseri signed for Macclesfield Town. In the winter of 2017, he trialled with Swedish clubs AIK and GIF Sundsvall. In March 2017, he joined Syrianska in the same country.

On 26 January 2018, Nasseri signed with League One club Gillingham for the remainder of the season. He made his professional debut on 10 March, coming on as a late substitute in a 3–1 away win against Portsmouth. He scored a goal in his first start for the club on 29 March 2018 against MK Dons. He signed a one-year deal with the club in May 2018, but he made just four further league appearances for the club before his contract was cancelled by mutual consent in January 2019.

After an unsuccessful trial with Dutch side RKC Waalwijk, Nasseri signed for NIFL Premiership side Glentoran in October 2019. He scored on his debut on 9 October 2019 as the club fell to a 2–1 defeat to Coleraine in the Northern Ireland Football League Cup, before making his full league debut three days later in a 3–1 win over Carrick Rangers. On 31 July 2020, Nasseri and Glentoran won the 2019–20 Irish Cup.

The day after winning the Irish Cup it was announced that Nasseri had signed for Linfield. Nasseri made his Linfield debut in a UEFA Champions League Preliminary round game against Tre Fiori. On 16 August 2021 it was announced Nasseri had signed for Larne, as part of a player exchange deal involving Martin Donnelly.

Nasseri left Larne in the summer of 2022, and was without a club until joining Macclesfield in February 2023. After a single appearance, in which he scored a consolation penalty in a 2–1 Cheshire Senior Cup defeat to Runcorn Linnets, Nasseri was released at the conclusion of the 2022–23 season.

In October 2024, Nasseri joined Northern Premier League Division One West club Stalybridge Celtic.

== Indoor football career ==
In 2025, Nasseri joined Ian Wright and Chloe Kelly's Wembley Rangers AFC in the inaugural season of Baller League UK.

== Career statistics ==
=== Club ===
As of 1 August 2020

Club	Division	Season	League		Cup		League cup		Other		Total	
Club	Division	Season	Apps	Goals	Apps	Goals	Apps	Goals	Apps	Goals	Apps	Goals
Macclesfield Town	National League	2016-17	0	0	0	0	0	0	0	0	0	0
Syrianska	Superettan	2017	25	2	1	0	–		–		26	2
Gillingham	League One	2017-18	4	1	0	0	0	0	0	0	4	1
Gillingham	League One	2018-19	4	0	0	0	0	0	3	0	7	0
Glentoran	NIFL Premiership	2019–20	20	6	4	0	1	1	–		25	7
Linfield	NIFL Premiership	2020–21	0	0	0	0	0	0	0	0	0	0
Sweden total			25	2	1	0	0	0	0	0	26	2
England total			8	1	0	0	0	0	3	0	11	1
Northern Ireland total			20	6	4	0	1	1	0	0	25	7
Career total			53	9	5	0	1	1	3	0	62	10

== Honours ==
Glentoran

- Irish Cup: 2019–20

Linfield

- NIFL Premiership: 2020-21
- Irish Cup: 2020-21

Larne

- County Antrim Shield: 2021-22
