= Finn O'Mara =

English footballer (born 1999)

Personal information
- Full name: Finn George O'Mara
- Date of birth: 3 February 1999 (age 27)
- Place of birth: Southwark, England
- Position: Defender

Team information
- Current team: Margate

Youth career
- Dartford
- –2016: Gillingham

Senior career*
Years	Team	Apps	(Gls)
2016–2018	Gillingham	2	(0)
2017–2018	→ Folkestone Invicta (loan)	15	(0)
2018–2022	Folkestone Invicta	49	(3)
2021	→ Welling United (loan)	2	(0)
2021–2022	→ Hastings United (loan)	6	(1)
2022–2023	Hastings United	11	(2)
2022	→ Cray Valley Paper Mills (loan)	3	(0)
2023	→ Herne Bay (loan)	16	(1)
2023	Erith & Belvedere	10	(0)
2023–2024	Faversham Town	16	(0)
2024	Whitstable Town	10	(1)
2024–2025	Hastings United	12	(0)
2025	→ Whitstable Town (dual-registration)	14	(2)
2025–2026	Whitstable Town	34	(6)
2026–	Margate	0	(0)
- * Club domestic league appearances and goals as of 21:20, 24 May 2026 (UTC)

Finn George O'Mara (born 3 February 1999) is an English footballer who plays for Isthmian League South East Division club Margate. He can operate as either centre-back or right-back.

== Career ==
=== Youth ===
O'Mara was born in the London Borough of Southwark and grew up in Wilmington, Kent. He attended St Columba's Catholic Boys' School in Bexleyheath, London. Before joining the Gillingham youth system, O'Mara was playing for Dartford, getting a trial from a family friend who happened to be a youth coach there and making it into the under-14s on account of one of the players getting tonsillitis. Having four weeks to get into the team, he managed to do it and they won the league that season, catching the attention of Gillingham where he then moved.

Despite being a defender, O'Mara started out as a central midfielder in his youth.

=== Gillingham ===
Promoted to the Gillingham squad from the academy in 2017, 2017-18 would be the defender's first full season as a professional. He made his League One debut against Blackburn Rovers on 30 September 2017 as substitute for the injured Mark Byrne.

=== Non-League ===
On 12 October 2018, O'Mara signed an 18-month contract with Isthmian League Premier Division side Folkestone Invicta, having previously had a spell on loan with the club during the previous season.

In January 2021, he joined National League South side Welling United on a month-long loan deal due to the Isthmian League being suspended due to Covid.

On 19 November 2021, he dropped down a division to join Isthmian League South East Division side Hastings United on a one-month loan deal, going straight into the squad for the clash with Sussex rivals Three Bridges. He signed for the club on a permanent basis in January 2022.

In January 2023, he joined Herne Bay on loan having spent time at Cray Valley Paper Mills earlier in the season.

In July 2023, O'Mara signed for newly promoted Isthmian League South East Division club Erith & Belvedere. In November 2023, he joined SCEFL Premier Division club Faversham Town.

In May 2024, O'Mara joined fellow SCEFL Premier Division side Whitstable Town. In October 2024, he returned to Hastings United. He returned to Whitstable Town on dual-registration in February 2025. He won the 2024–25 FA Vase with Whistable Town.

In May 2026, O'Mara followed manager Jamie Coyle from Whitstable Town to Isthmian League South East Division club Margate.

== Honours ==
Whitstable Town

- FA Vase: 2024–25
- SCEFL Premier Division: 2025–26
