= Mitchell Dickenson =

English footballer

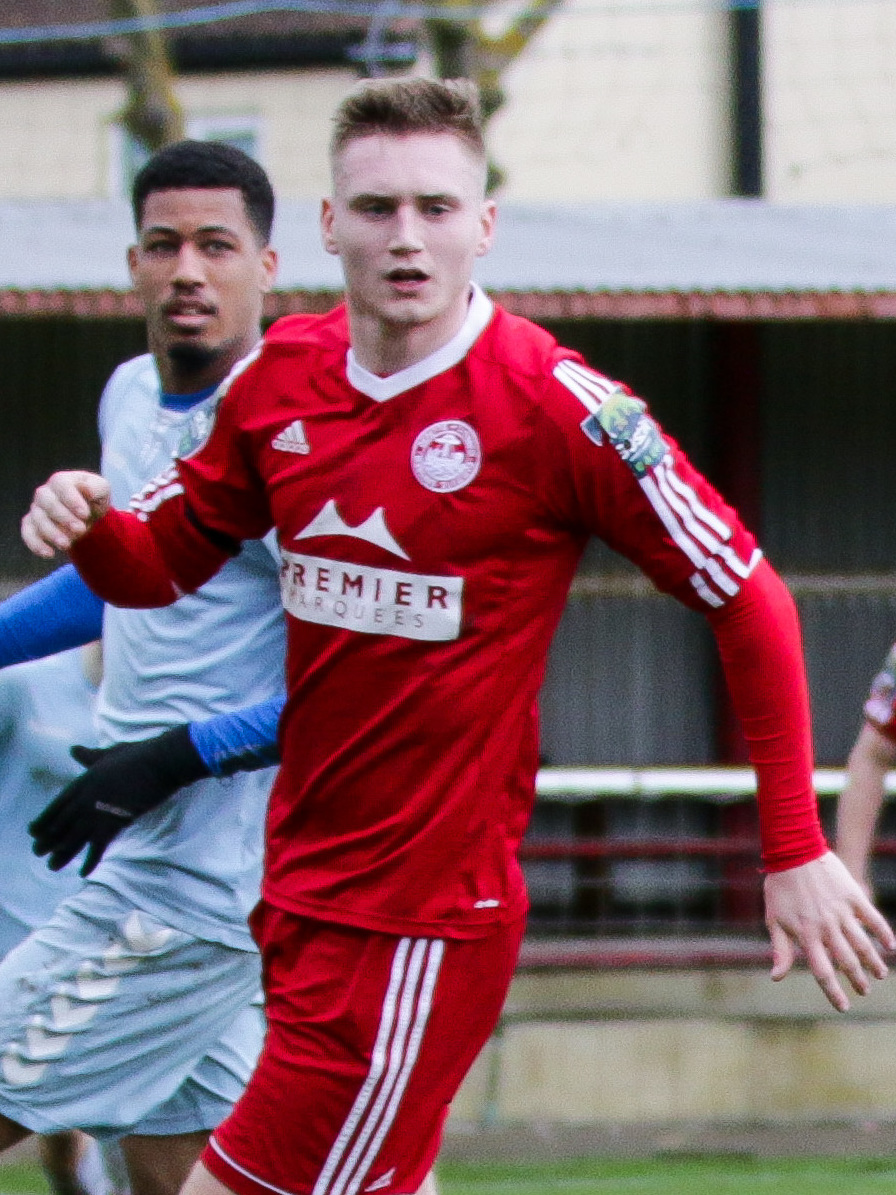
- Dickenson with Hythe Town in March 2018

Personal information
- Full name: Mitchell Jack Dickenson
- Date of birth: 14 September 1996 (age 30)
- Place of birth: Maidstone, Kent, England
- Position: Defender

Team information
- Current team: Welling United

Youth career
- 2010–2015: Gillingham

Senior career*
Years	Team	Apps	(Gls)
2015–2017	Gillingham	2	(0)
2016	→ Hastings United (loan)	2	(0)
2016–2017	→ Hastings United (loan)	9	(1)
2017–2019	Hythe Town	76	(2)
2019–2020	Hemel Hempstead Town	24	(0)
2019	→ Hornchurch (loan)	5	(0)
2020–2023	Eastbourne Borough	86	(4)
2023–	Welling United	0	(0)

International career
2019–	England C	1	(0)
- * Club domestic league appearances and goals as of 17:43, 22 April 2023 (UTC)

Mitchell Dickenson (born 14 September 1996) is an English professional footballer who most recently played as a defender for Welling United and the England C team.

== Club career ==
Dickenson came through the youth ranks at Gillingham, and signed professional terms in March 2015. In March 2016 he signed for a month on loan with Isthmian League Division One South side Hastings United.

He made his senior debut on 30 August 2016, in a 2–1 defeat to Luton Town in an EFL Trophy match at Priestfield Stadium. Dickenson made his English Football League debut away at Bury on 4 March 2017, coming on as a first half substitute for the injured Ryan Jackson. On 20 May 2017, Gillingham announced that Dickenson had been released at the end of his contract.

On 29 July 2017, he signed for Isthmian League South Division side Hythe Town. He joined Hemel Hempstead Town in the summer of 2019. In August 2019, Dickenson signed for Hornchurch, before returning to Hemel in September.

In July 2023, Dickenson signed for Welling United following three seasons with National League South rivals Eastbourne Borough, joining the club as captain.

== Career statistics ==
As of 29 April 2023.

Club	Season	League			FA Cup		League Cup		Other		Total	
Club	Season	Division	Apps	Goals	Apps	Goals	Apps	Goals	Apps	Goals	Apps	Goals
Gillingham	2015–16	League One	0	0	0	0	0	0	0	0	0	0
Gillingham	2016–17	League One	2	0	0	0	0	0	3 (Note: Appearance(s) in EFL Trophy)	0	5	0
Gillingham	Total		2	0	0	0	0	0	3	0	5	0
Hastings United (loan)	2015–16	Isthmian League; Division One South	2	0	—		—		—		2	0
Hastings United (loan)	2016–17	Isthmian League; Division One South	9	1	—		—		—		9	1
Hastings United (loan)	Total		11	1	—		—		—		11	1
Hythe Town	2017–18	Isthmian League; Division One South	40	2	2	0	—		4 (Note: Two appearances in Alan Turvey Trophy, two appearances in FA Trophy)	0	46	2
Hythe Town	2018–19	Isthmian League; Division One South East	36	0	2	0	—		7 (Note: Three appearances in Alan Turvey Trophy, two appearances in FA Trophy, two appearances in Kent Senior Cup)	0	45	0
Hythe Town	Total		76	2	4	0	—		11	0	91	2
Hemel Hempstead	2019–20	National League South	24	0	1	0	—		1 (Note: Appearance(s) in FA Trophy)	0	26	0
Hornchurch (loan)	2019–20	Isthmian League; Division One South East	5	0	0	0	—		0	0	5	0
Eastbourne Borough	2020–21	National League South	19	0	4	0	—		1	0	24	0
Eastbourne Borough	2021–22	National League South	28	1	3	0	—		2 (Note: One appearance in Sussex Senior Challenge Cup, one appearance in National League South play-offs)	0	33	1
Eastbourne Borough	2022–23	National League South	39	3	3	0	—		2	0	44	3
Eastbourne Borough	Total		86	4	10	0	—		5	0	101	4
Career total			204	7	15	0	0	0	20	0	239	7
