= 2019–20 Gillingham F.C. season =

English football club season

Gillingham
2019–20 season
- Chairman: Paul Scally
- Manager: Steve Evans
- Stadium: Priestfield Stadium
- League One: 10th
- FA Cup: Third round
- EFL Cup: First round
- EFL Trophy: Group stage
- Top goalscorer: League: Alex Jakubiak (6); All: Alex Jakubiak (7)
- Highest home attendance: 10,913 vs West Ham United (5 January 2020); FA Cup
- Lowest home attendance: 1,055 vs Colchester United (3 September 2019); EFL Trophy
- Average home league attendance: 5,148
Home colours	Away colours

The 2019–20 season was Gillingham's 127th in their existence and seventh consecutive season in League One. Along with League One, the club are also participated in the FA Cup, EFL Cup and EFL Trophy. The season covered the period from 1 July 2019 to 30 June 2020.

== Transfers ==
=== Transfers in ===
Date	Position	Nationality	Name	From	Fee	Ref.
23 May 2019	DF	(England)	Connor Ogilvie	(England) Tottenham Hotspur	Free transfer	
1 July 2019	GK	(Republic of Ireland)	Jack Bonham	(England) Brentford	Free transfer	
1 July 2019	DM	(Mali)	Ousseynou Cissé	(England) Milton Keynes Dons	Free transfer	
1 July 2019	RB	(Northern Ireland)	Lee Hodson	(Scotland) Rangers	Free transfer	
1 July 2019	CM	(England)	Stuart O'Keefe	(Wales) Cardiff City	Free transfer	
1 July 2019	CM	(England)	Matty Willock	(England) Manchester United	Free transfer	
25 July 2019	LW	(Jamaica)	Mark Marshall	(England) Charlton Athletic	Free transfer	
25 July 2019	CF	(France)	Mikael Mandron	(England) Colchester United	Free transfer	
4 September 2019	LM	(England)	Ben Pringle	(England) Preston North End	Free transfer	
24 January 2020	CF	(England)	John Akinde	(England) Lincoln City	Undisclosed	

=== Loans in ===
Date from	Position	Nationality	Name	From	Date until	Ref.
1 July 2019	CF	(England)	Mikael Ndjoli	(England) Bournemouth	8 January 2020	
1 July 2019	LW	(England)	Nathan Thomas	(England) Sheffield United	24 July 2019	
2 July 2019	CB	(England)	Alfie Jones	(England) Southampton	30 June 2020	
26 July 2019	CF	(Scotland)	Alex Jakubiak	(England) Watford	31 January 2020	
29 August 2019	DM	(Republic of Ireland)	Thomas O'Connor	(England) Southampton	30 June 2020	
29 August 2019	CM	(England)	Olly Lee	(Scotland) Heart of Midlothian	30 June 2020	
9 January 2020	LM	(England)	Jordan Roberts	(England) Ipswich Town	30 June 2020	
31 January 2020	LW	(England)	Jordan Graham	(England) Wolverhampton Wanderers	30 June 2020	

=== Loans out ===
Date from	Position	Nationality	Name	To	Date until	Ref.
August 2019	FW	(England)	Roman Campbell	(England) Sittingbourne	September 2019	
5 October 2019	FW	(England)	Roman Campbell	(England) Enfield Town	November 2019	
9 October 2019	MF	(England)	Henry Woods	(England) Concord Rangers	November 2019	
4 December 2019	MF	(England)	Henry Woods	(England) Concord Rangers	January 2020	
6 December 2019	FW	(England)	Roman Campbell	(England) Ramsgate	January 2020	
23 December 2019	RB	(England)	Jimmy Witt	(England) Sittingbourne	February 2020	
23 December 2019	MF	(England)	Jay Hards	(England) Sittingbourne	February 2020	
1 January 2020	FW	(England)	Roman Campbell	(England) Margate	February 2020	
17 January 2020	DM	(Mali)	Ousseynou Cissé	(England) Leyton Orient	30 June 2020	
30 January 2020	RB	(Northern Ireland)	Lee Hodson	(Scotland) St Mirren	30 June 2020	
22 February 2020	DM	(Antigua and Barbuda)	TJ Bramble	(England) Sittingbourne	March 2020	

=== Transfers out ===
Date	Position	Nationality	Name	To	Fee	Ref.
1 July 2019	MF	(England)	Jude Arthurs	Free agent	Released	
1 July 2019	CM	(England)	Billy Bingham	(England) Bromley	Free transfer	
1 July 2019	GK	(England)	Louie Catherall	Free agent	Released	
1 July 2019	CM	(England)	Ben Chapman	(England) Dulwich Hamlet	Free transfer	
1 July 2019	GK	(England)	Tom Hadler	(England) Eastbourne Borough	Free transfer	
1 July 2019	GK	(Czech Republic)	Tomáš Holý	(England) Ipswich Town	Free transfer	
1 July 2019	CB	(England)	Ryan Huckle	(England) Faversham Town	Free transfer	
1 July 2019	CB	(England)	Alex Lacey	(England) Notts County	Released	
1 July 2019	MF	(England)	Charles Noyelle	(United States) Tulsa Golden Hurricane	Free transfer	
1 July 2019	RB	(England)	Luke O'Neill	(England) AFC Wimbledon	Free transfer	
1 July 2019	CB	(England)	George Sheminant	(England) Chatham Town	Free transfer	
10 July 2019	CF	(England)	Tom Eaves	(England) Hull City	Free transfer	
15 July 2019	CM	(England)	Dean Parrett	(England) Stevenage	Free transfer	
26 July 2019	CM	(Republic of Ireland)	Callum Reilly	(England) AFC Wimbledon	Mutual consent	
16 August 2019	CM	(England)	Josh Rees	(England) Bromley	Mutual consent	
21 August 2019	CM	(England)	Darren Oldaker	(England) Billericay Town	Mutual consent	
31 August 2019	CF	(England)	Elliott List	(England) Stevenage	Undisclosed	
2 September 2019	CB	(Democratic Republic of the Congo)	Gabriel Zakuani	(England) Swindon Town	Mutual consent	
2 September 2019	MF	(England)	Bradley Stevenson	(England) Herne Bay	Mutual consent	
2 September 2019	MF	(England)	Miquel Scarlett	Free agent	Mutual consent	
23 January 2020	RW	(Jamaica)	Mark Marshall	(England) Northampton Town	Released	
30 January 2020	CF	(England)	Roman Campbell	(England) Sittingbourne	Free transfer	
31 January 2020	LB	(Republic of Ireland)	Bradley Garmston	(England) Grimsby Town	Mutual consent	

== Pre-season ==
The Gills announced their pre-season programme on 18 June 2019.

6 July 2019 Friendly	Faversham Town	1–9	Gillingham	Faversham
14:00 BST	Huckle 61'	Report	Ogilvie 3'; Ndjoli 16', 21'; Reilly 22'; Willock 55'; Thomas 72', 83'; Tucker 77'; Charles-Cook 82'	Stadium: Salters Lane; Attendance: 830

13 July 2019 Friendly	Folkestone Invicta	0–4	Gillingham	Folkestone
15:00 BST		Report	Thomas 1'; Ndjoli 39'; Hanlan 60' (pen.); Trialist 82'	Stadium: The Fullicks Stadium; Attendance: 681

16 July 2019 Friendly	Dartford	1–2	Gillingham	Dartford
19:45 BST	Trialist 33'	Report	List 10'; Byrne 35'	Stadium: Princes Park; Attendance: 815; Referee: Charles Breakspear

20 July 2019 Friendly	Gillingham	3–1	Charlton Athletic	Gillingham
14:00 BST	O'Keefe 13'; Ndjoli 48'; List 89'	Report	Aneke 43'	Stadium: MEMS Priestfield Stadium; Referee: Chris Pollard

21 July 2019 Friendly	Gillingham	1–2	Millwall	Gillingham
13:00 BST	Trialist 54' (pen.)	Report	Skalák 16'; Mahoney 56'	Stadium: MEMS Priestfield Stadium; Referee: Gavin Ward

23 July 2019 Friendly	Dover Athletic	2–2	Gillingham	River
19:45 BST	Effiong 4'; Pavey 64'	Report	List 50'; Hanlan 52'	Stadium: Crabble Athletic Ground; Attendance: 888; Referee: Isaac Searle

26 July 2019 Friendly	Gillingham	1–1	Southend United	Gillingham
19:00 BST	Mandron 40'	Report	Hutchinson 23'	Stadium: MEMS Priestfield Stadium; Referee: John Brooks

27 July 2019 Friendly	Stevenage	Cancelled	Gillingham	Stevenage
15:00 BST		Report		Stadium: Lamex Stadium

29 July 2019 Friendly	Welling United	5–0	Gillingham	Welling
19:30 BST	Oyinsan 16'; Coombes 18'; Cosgrave 55', 85'; Cook 83'	Report		Stadium: Park View Road; Referee: Alan Dale

== Competitions ==
=== League One ===
==== League table ====
Pos	Team	Pld	W	D	L	GF	GA	GD	Pts	PPG	Promotion, qualification or relegation
6	Fleetwood Town	35	16	12	7	51	38	+13	60	1.71	Qualification for League One play-offs (Note: Four teams play for one spot and promotion to the EFL Championship.)
7	Peterborough United	35	17	8	10	68	40	+28	59	1.69	
8	Sunderland	36	16	11	9	48	32	+16	59	1.64	
9	Doncaster Rovers	34	15	9	10	51	33	+18	54	1.59	
10	Gillingham	35	12	15	8	42	34	+8	51	1.46	
11	Ipswich Town	36	14	10	12	46	36	+10	52	1.44	
12	Burton Albion	35	12	12	11	50	50	0	48	1.37	
13	Blackpool	35	11	12	12	44	43	+1	45	1.29	
14	Bristol Rovers	35	12	9	14	38	49	−11	45	1.29	

Source: EFL Official Website
Rules for classification: 1) Points per game; 2) Goal difference; 3) Number of goals scored; 4) Head-to-head results; 5) Wins; 6) Away goals; 7) Penalty points (sec 9.5); 8) 12-point sending-off offences

==== Results summary ====
Overall								Home						Away					
Pld	W	D	L	GF	GA	GD	Pts	W	D	L	GF	GA	GD	W	D	L	GF	GA	GD
35	12	15	8	42	34	+8	51	9	3	5	27	17	+10	3	12	3	15	17	−2

Last updated: 7 March 2020.
Source: BBC

==== Matches ====
On Thursday, 20 June 2019, the EFL League One fixtures were revealed.

3 August 2019 1	Doncaster Rovers	1–1	Gillingham	Doncaster
15:00 BST	Sadlier 45+2'	Report	Jakubiak 30'; Fuller (yellow card) 79'	Stadium: Keepmoat Stadium; Attendance: 7,939; Referee: John Busby

10 August 2019 2	Gillingham	1–2	Burton Albion	Gillingham
15:00 BST	Cissé 7'	Report	O'Toole (yellow card) 10'; Akins (penalty missed) 32'; Broadhead 42', 45'; Brayford (yellow card) 90+1'	Stadium: Priestfield Stadium; Attendance: 4,682; Referee: James Linington

20 August 2019 3	Gillingham	2–2	Blackpool	Gillingham
19:45 BST	Jakubiak 9', 37'	Report	Kaikai 41'; Gnanduillet 45+3'; Bushiri (yellow card) 59'	Stadium: Priestfield Stadium; Attendance: 4,390; Referee: Neil Hair

24 August 2019 4	Coventry City	1–0	Gillingham	Bordesley
15:00 BST	Hyam 26'	Report	Fuller (yellow card) 28'; Byrne (yellow card) 35'	Stadium: St Andrew's Trillion Trophy Stadium; Attendance: 5,624; Referee: Martin Coy

31 August 2019 5	Gillingham	5–0	Bolton Wanderers	Gillingham
15:00 BST	Ogilvie 27'; Lee 39', 57'; Willock (yellow card) 45+2'; Hanlan 54'; Boon 76' (o.g.)	Report	Lowe (yellow card) 21'	Stadium: Priestfield Stadium; Attendance: 5,065; Referee: Robert Lewis

7 September 2019 6	Tranmere Rovers	2–2	Gillingham	Birkenhead
15:00 BST	Payne (yellow card) 38'; Mullin (penalty missed) 66' 70'; Jennings 67'	Report	Byrne (yellow card) 14'; Jakubiak 16'; Jones 36'	Stadium: Prenton Park; Attendance: 6,687; Referee: Michael Salisbury

14 September 2019 7	Gillingham	2–0	Wycombe Wanderers	Gillingham
15:00 BST	Ndjoli 59', 73' (pen.)	Report		Stadium: Priestfield Stadium; Attendance: 4,814; Referee: James Adcock

17 September 2019 8	Bristol Rovers	1–1	Gillingham	Horfield
19:45 BST	Smith 38'; Sercombe (yellow card) 90+5'	Report	O'Connor 83'	Stadium: Memorial Stadium; Attendance: 6,370; Referee: Kevin Johnson

21 September 2019 9	Gillingham	0–1	Ipswich Town	Gillingham
15:00 BST	Byrne (yellow card) 43'	Report	Vincent-Young 32'; Wilson (yellow card) 87'; Judge (yellow card) 90'	Stadium: Priestfield Stadium; Attendance: 7,214; Referee: Chris Sarginson

28 September 2019 10	Oxford United	3–0	Gillingham	Oxford
15:00 BST	Henry 10', 34'; Taylor 30'; Brannagan (yellow card) 86'	Report	Fuller (yellow card) 57'; Ehmer (yellow card) 82'	Stadium: The Kassam Stadium; Attendance: 6,553; Referee: Andy Woolmer

5 October 2019 11	Gillingham	3–1	Southend United	Gillingham
15:00 BST	Jones 43'; O'Keefe 46'; Fuller (yellow card) 57'; Ndjoli (penalty missed) 72' (penalty missed) 74'; Hanlan 87'	Report	Cox 58'; Acquah (yellow card) 63' (yellow-red card) 66'; Lennon (yellow card) 71'; Bwomono (yellow card) 71'; Kiernan (yellow card) 81'	Stadium: Priestfield Stadium; Attendance: 5,091; Referee: Leigh Doughty

12 October 2019 12	Portsmouth	0–0	Gillingham	Milton
15:00 BST	Brown (yellow card) 32'	Report	Ehmer (yellow card) 36'; O'Keefe (yellow card) 45'; Byrne (yellow card) 58'; Jones (yellow card) 74'; Tucker (yellow card) 85'	Stadium: Fratton Park; Attendance: 18,036; Referee: Graham Salisbury

19 October 2019 13	Gillingham	1–2	Peterborough United	Gillingham
15:00 BST	Ehmer (yellow card) 46'; Byrne (yellow card) 51'; Mandron 80'; Ogilvie (yellow card) 88'	Report	Ward 40'; Eisa 51' (pen.); Knight (yellow card) 66'	Stadium: Priestfield Stadium; Attendance: 6,269; Referee: Charles Breakspear

22 October 2019 14	Shrewsbury Town	1–1	Gillingham	Shrewsbury
19:45 BST	Beckles (yellow card) 42' (goal) 64'; Pierre (yellow card) 45+1'; Giles (yellow card) 58'; Goss (yellow card) 68'; Okenabirhie (yellow card) 88'	Report	Jones (yellow card) 19'; O'Keefe (yellow card) 30' (goal) 43' (pen.)	Stadium: Montgomery Waters Meadow; Attendance: 5,076; Referee: Will Finnie

26 October 2019 15	Accrington Stanley	0–1	Gillingham	Accrington
12:00 BST	McConville (yellow card) 24'; Clark (yellow card) 90+4'	Report	Charles-Cook 59'; Jones (yellow card) 85'	Stadium: Wham Stadium; Attendance: 2,102; Referee: John Busby

2 November 2019 16	Gillingham	0–3	Rotherham United	Gillingham
15:00 GMT		Report	Smith (penalty missed) 18' 19'; Lindsay (yellow card) 28'; Crooks 43', 88'	Stadium: Priestfield Stadium; Attendance: 4,893; Referee: Lee Swabey

16 November 2019 17	Gillingham	1–0	Lincoln City	Gillingham
15:00 GMT	Mandron 24'	Report		Stadium: Priestfield Stadium; Attendance: 5,567; Referee: Christopher Pollard

23 November 2019 18	AFC Wimbledon	1–0	Gillingham	Norbiton
15:00 GMT	Pinnock (yellow card) 7'; Wagstaff 19'; Pigott (yellow card) 45'; Delaney (yellow card) 83'; Appiah (yellow card) 90+4'	Report	Ogilvie (yellow card) 3'; Byrne (yellow card) 85'; Pringle (red card) 90+3'	Stadium: The Cherry Red Records Stadium; Attendance: 4,554; Referee: Kevin Johnson

7 December 2019 19	Gillingham	1–0	Sunderland	Gillingham
15:00 GMT	Tucker (yellow card) 66'; Ogilvie 89'	Report	Flanagan (yellow card) 88'; Ozturk (yellow card) 90+2'	Stadium: Priestfield Stadium; Attendance: 5,401; Referee: Andy Woolmer

14 December 2019 20	Fleetwood Town	1–1	Gillingham	Fleetwood
15:00 GMT	Madden (yellow card) 36' (goal) 56'	Report	Fuller (yellow card) 10'; Hanlan (yellow card) 47'; Jones (yellow card) 63'; Ehmer (yellow card) 75'; Jakubiak 82'; Pringle (yellow card) 90+1'	Stadium: Highbury Stadium; Attendance: 2,468; Referee: Graham Salisbury

21 December 2019 21	Gillingham	3–1	Milton Keynes Dons	Gillingham
13:00 GMT	Mandron 31'; Hanlan 33'; Ehmer 57'; Lee (yellow card) 62'	Report	Gilbey (yellow card) 29', (goal) 52'	Stadium: Priestfield Stadium; Referee: Nick Kinseley

26 December 2019 22	Ipswich Town	0–0	Gillingham	Ipswich
15:00 GMT	Norwood (yellow card) 27'; Nsiala (yellow card) 45+2'; Judge (yellow card) 90+1'; Edwards (yellow card) 90+2'	Report	Tucker (yellow card) 90+3'	Stadium: Portman Road; Referee: Craig Hicks

29 December 2019 23	Gillingham	1–0	Rochdale	Gillingham
13:00 GMT	Lee (yellow card) 81'; Ogilvie 86' (yellow card) 90+6'; O'Keefe (yellow card) 90+7'	Report	Keohane (yellow card) 28'; O'Connell (yellow card) 57'; Camps (yellow card) 67'; Baah (yellow card) 69'; Sánchez (yellow card) 79'; Williams (yellow card) 90+6' (yellow-red card) 90+6'	Stadium: Priestfield Stadium; Attendance: 4,761; Referee: David Rock

1 January 2020 24	Gillingham	1–1	Portsmouth	Gillingham
15:00 GMT	Fuller (yellow card) 63'; Jakubiak 80'	Report	Evans 36' (yellow card) 38'; Naylor (yellow card) 65'; Raggett (yellow card) 90+6'	Stadium: Priestfield Stadium; Attendance: 5,724; Referee: Alan Young

4 January 2020	Southend United	v	Gillingham	Southend-on-Sea
15:00 GMT		Report		Stadium: Roots Hall
Note: The match was postponed on 2 December, due to the club's progression in the FA Cup.

11 January 2020 25	Peterborough United	0–0	Gillingham	Peterborough
15:00 GMT	Beevers (yellow card) 52' (yellow-red card) 87'	Report	Jones (yellow card) 73'; O'Connor (yellow card) 80'	Stadium: Weston Homes Stadium; Attendance: 6,696; Referee: Kevin Johnson

18 January 2020 26	Gillingham	1–1	Oxford United	Gillingham
15:00 GMT	Lee (yellow card) 45+1' (goal) 61' (pen.)	Report	Fosu 16'; Mackie (yellow card) 37'; Baptiste (yellow card) 75'; Browne (yellow card) 86'	Stadium: Priestfield Stadium; Attendance: 5,051; Referee: Neil Hair

25 January 2020 27	Rochdale	2–2	Gillingham	Spotland
15:00 GMT	Henderson 28' (pen.); Ryan (yellow card) 45+3'; Dooley 68'	Report	Roberts 32', 59' (yellow card) 76'	Stadium: Crown Oil Arena; Attendance: 3,084; Referee: Paul Marsden

29 January 2020 28	Gillingham	2–0	Shrewsbury Town	Gillingham
19:45 GMT	O'Keefe 26'; Lee 40' (pen.); Akinde (yellow card) 62'	Report	Hart (yellow card) 77'; Walker (yellow card) 89'; Pierre (yellow card) 90+4'	Stadium: Priestfield Stadium; Attendance: 4,212; Referee: Geoff Eltringham

8 February 2020 29	Burton Albion	0–0	Gillingham	Burton upon Trent
15:00 GMT	Sarkic (yellow card) 42' (yellow-red card) 67'; O'Toole (yellow card) 76'; Nartey (yellow card) 90+2'	Report	Fuller (yellow card) 21'; Roberts (yellow card) 88'	Stadium: Pirelli Stadium; Attendance: 2,750; Referee: Alan Young

11 February 2020 30	Blackpool	2–3	Gillingham	Blackpool
19:45 GMT	Gnanduillet 7'; Ronan (yellow card) 24'; Delfouneso 90+1'	Report	O'Keefe (yellow card) 59'; Akinde 73'; Charles-Cook 76'; Hanlan 90+4'	Stadium: Bloomfield Road; Attendance: 6,816; Referee: Darren Handley

15 February 2020 31	Gillingham	2–1	Doncaster Rovers	Gillingham
15:00 GMT	O'Connor (yellow card) 41'; John 44' (o.g.) 67' (o.g.); Fuller (yellow card) 83'	Report	Sheaf 13' (yellow card) 85'; John (yellow card) 23'; Okenabirhie (red card) 38'; Wright (yellow card) 76'; Halliday (yellow card) 90'	Stadium: Priestfield Stadium; Attendance: 4,754; Referee: Josh Smith

18 February 2020 32	Southend United	0–1	Gillingham	Southend-on-Sea
19:45 GMT	Mitchell-Nelson (yellow card) 74'; Kelman (yellow card) 90+3'	Report	Tucker (yellow card) 30'; Ogilvie 67'; Ehmer (yellow card) 72'	Stadium: Roots Hall; Referee: Trevor Kettle

22 February 2020 33	Lincoln City	0–0	Gillingham	Lincoln
15:00 GMT	Hesketh (yellow card) 13'; Edun (yellow card) 58' (yellow-red card) 90'; Bridcutt (yellow card) 69'; Bostwick (yellow card) 90+3'	Report	Fuller (yellow card) 68'; Hanlan (yellow card) 90'	Stadium: Sincil Bank; Attendance: 8,950; Referee: Tom Nield

29 February 2020 34	Gillingham	1–2	AFC Wimbledon	Gillingham
15:00 GMT	Charles-Cook 87'	Report	Pigott 49'; Roscrow (yellow card) 78'; O'Neill (yellow card) 82'; Reilly 90+1'	Stadium: Priesfield Stadium; Attendance: 4,893; Referee: John Busby

7 March 2020 35	Sunderland	2–2	Gillingham	Sunderland
15:00 GMT	Öztürk (yellow card) 42'; Lafferty 64', 83'	Report	Graham (yellow card) 42'; Roberts (yellow card) 43'; O'Keefe (yellow card) 44'; Mandron 74', 90+6'	Stadium: Stadium of Light; Attendance: 29,872; Referee: Antony Coggins

14 March 2020	Gillingham	v	Fleetwood Town	Gillingham
15:00 GMT				Stadium: Priestfield Stadium
Note: Season was suspended until 3 April 2020, due to the COVID-19 pandemic.

21 March 2020	Milton Keynes Dons	v	Gillingham	Denbigh
15:00 GMT				Stadium: Stadium mk
Note: Season was suspended until 3 April 2020, due to the COVID-19 pandemic.

29 March 2020	Rotherham United	v	Gillingham	Rotherham
13:00 GMT				Stadium: AESSEAL New York Stadium
Note: Season was suspended until 3 April 2020, due to the COVID-19 pandemic.

4 April 2020	Gillingham	v	Accrington Stanley	Gillingham
15:00 GMT				Stadium: Priestfield Stadium
Note: On 3 April, the English Football League decided to postpone all football until safe to do so due to the COVID-19 pandemic.

10 April 2020	Gillingham	v	Coventry City	Gillingham
15:00 BST				Stadium: Priestfield Stadium
Note: On 3 April, the English Football League decided to postpone all football until safe to do so due to the COVID-19 pandemic.

14 April 2020	Bolton Wanderers	v	Gillingham	Horwich
20:00 BST				Stadium: University of Bolton Stadium
Note: On 3 April, the English Football League decided to postpone all football until safe to do so due to the COVID-19 pandemic.

18 April 2020	Gillingham	v	Tranmere Rovers	Gillingham
15:00 BST				Stadium: Priestfield Stadium
Note: On 3 April, the English Football League decided to postpone all football until safe to do so due to the COVID-19 pandemic.

25 April 2020	Wycombe Wanderers	v	Gillingham	High Wycombe
15:00 BST				Stadium: Adams Park
Note: On 3 April, the English Football League decided to postpone all football until safe to do so due to the COVID-19 pandemic.

3 May 2020	Gillingham	v	Bristol Rovers	Gillingham
15:00 BST				Stadium: Priestfield Stadium
Note: On 3 April, the English Football League decided to postpone all football until safe to do so due to the COVID-19 pandemic.

=== FA Cup ===
The first round draw was made on 21 October 2019. The second round draw was made live on 11 November from Chichester City's stadium, Oaklands Park. The third round draw was made live on BBC Two from Etihad Stadium, Micah Richards and Tony Adams conducted the draw.

9 November 2019 First round	Sunderland	1–1	Gillingham	Sunderland
13:00 GMT	McGeady 15'; Willis (yellow card) 42'; O'Nien (yellow card) 90+2'	Report	Hanlan (yellow card) 29'; Lee 46'	Stadium: Stadium of Light; Attendance: 7,892; Referee: Michael Salisbury

19 November 2019 First round replay	Gillingham	1–0 (a.e.t.)	Sunderland	Gillingham
19:45 GMT	Ehmer (yellow card) 45+1'; Hanlan 105'	Report	De Bock (yellow card) 55'; O'Nien (yellow card) 85'; Connelly (yellow card) 117'	Stadium: Priestfield Stadium; Attendance: 3,561; Referee: Alan Young

1 December 2019 Second round	Gillingham	3–0	Doncaster Rovers	Gillingham
14:00 GMT	Byrne 11'; Lee 15'; Hanlan 68'	Report	Halliday (yellow card) 64'; Wright (yellow card) 70'; Bingham (yellow card) 82'	Stadium: Priestfield Stadium; Attendance: 3,216; Referee: Darren Handley

5 January 2020 Third round	Gillingham	0–2	West Ham United	Gillingham
18:15 GMT	Jones (yellow card) 65'	Report	Zabaleta 74', (yellow card) 79'; Fornals 90+4'	Stadium: Priestfield Stadium; Attendance: 10,913; Referee: Andrew Madley

=== EFL Cup ===
The first round draw was made on 20 June.

13 August 2019 First round	Gillingham	2–2 (1–4 p)	Newport County	Gillingham
19:45 BST	Hanlan 26' (pen.); Ndjoli (yellow card) 58' (yellow-red card) 90+3' (goal) 90' (pen.)	Report	Abrahams 84'; Howkins (yellow card) 89'; Amond 90+4'	Stadium: MEMS Priestfield Stadium; Referee: Trevor Kettle
	Penalties
	Jones (penalty missed); Mandron (penalty scored); Marshall (penalty missed)		Sheehan (penalty scored); Amond (penalty scored); Demetriou (penalty scored); Abrahams (penalty scored)

=== EFL Trophy ===
On 9 July 2019, the pre-determined group stage draw was announced with Invited clubs to be drawn on 12 July 2019.

Pos	Div	Team	Pld	W	PW	PL	L	GF	GA	GD	Pts	Qualification
1	L2	Colchester United	3	2	0	1	0	5	3	+2	7	Advance to Round 2
2	L1	Ipswich Town	3	2	0	0	1	6	2	+4	6	Advance to Round 2
3	L1	Gillingham	3	1	0	0	2	4	7	−3	3	
4	ACA	Tottenham Hotspur U21	3	0	1	0	2	2	5	−3	2	

Source: EFL.com

3 September 2019 Group stage	Gillingham	2–3	Colchester United	Gillingham
19:45 BST	O'Keefe 23'; Mandron 78'	Report	Cowan-Hall 8', 63'; Robinson 55'; Sarpong-Wiredu (yellow card) 75'	Stadium: Priestfield Stadium; Referee: David Rock

8 October 2019 Group stage	Ipswich Town	4–0	Gillingham	Ipswich
19:45 BST	Huws 8' (yellow card) 67'; Roberts 21'; Mandron 61' (o.g.); Keane 87'	Report	Mandron (yellow card) 21'; Woods (yellow card) 26'	Stadium: Portman Road; Referee: Tom Nield

12 November 2019 Group stage	Gillingham	2–0	Tottenham Hotspur U21	Gillingham
19:00 GMT	Jakubiak 25' (yellow card) 63'; Tucker 79'	Report	White (yellow card) 90+1'	Stadium: Priestfield Stadium; Referee: Craig Hicks
