= 2020–21 Gillingham F.C. season =

English football club season

Gillingham
2020–21 season
- Chairman: Paul Scally
- Manager: Steve Evans
- Stadium: Priestfield Stadium
- League One: 10th
- FA Cup: Second round
- EFL Cup: Third round
- EFL Trophy: Second round
- Top goalscorer: League: Vadaine Oliver (17); All: Vadaine Oliver (20)
Home colours	Away colours

The 2020–21 season was Gillingham's 128th season in their history and the eighth consecutive season in EFL League One. Along with League One, the club participated in the 2020–21 FA Cup, 2020–21 EFL Cup and 2020–21 EFL Trophy.

The season covered the period from 1 July 2020 to 30 June 2021.

== Transfers ==
=== Transfers in ===
Date	Pos.	Nat.	Name	From	Fee	Ref.
31 July 2020	RB	(England)	Ryan Jackson	(England) Colchester United	Free transfer	
5 August 2020	CF	(England)	Vadaine Oliver	(England) Northampton Town	Free transfer	
10 August 2020	CM	(England)	Jacob Mellis	(England) Bolton Wanderers	Free transfer	
12 August 2020	LW	(England)	Jordan Graham	(England) Wolverhampton Wanderers	Free transfer	
14 August 2020	RM	(Scotland)	Alex MacDonald	(England) Mansfield Town	Free transfer	
17 August 2020	CM	(England)	Kyle Dempsey	(England) Fleetwood Town	Free transfer	
21 August 2020	CB	(England)	Robbie McKenzie	(England) Hull City	Free transfer	
26 August 2020	CB	(Democratic Republic of the Congo)	Christian Maghoma	Free agent	—N/a	
21 September 2020	CF	(England)	Dominic Samuel	(England) Blackburn Rovers	Free transfer	
20 January 2021	LW	(England)	Tyreke Johnson	(England) Southampton	Undisclosed	
29 January 2021	GK	(France)	Sacha Bastien	(England) Stevenage	Free transfer	

=== Loans in ===
Date from	Pos.	Nat.	Name	From	Date until	Ref.
10 August 2020	CB	(England)	Zech Medley	(England) Arsenal	End of season	
13 August 2020	AM	(England)	Trae Coyle	(England) Arsenal	End of season	
10 September 2020	DM	(Scotland)	Scott Robertson	(Scotland) Celtic	30 January 2021	
17 September 2020	DM	(England)	Josh Eccles	(England) Coventry City	6 January 2021	
28 September 2020	CB	(England)	Declan Drysdale	(England) Coventry City	12 January 2021	
29 September 2020	DM	(Republic of Ireland)	Thomas O'Connor	(England) Southampton	End of season	
30 October 2020	GK	(England)	Joe Lumley	(England) Queens Park Rangers	6 November 2020	
8 January 2021	LW	(England)	Tyreke Johnson	(England) Southampton	20 January 2021	
14 January 2021	CM	(England)	Callum Slattery	(England) Southampton	End of season	
15 January 2021	CM	(England)	Olly Lee	(Scotland) Heart of Midlothian	End of season	
25 January 2021	CB	(England)	Robbie Cundy	(England) Bristol City	End of season	
1 February 2021	DM	(England)	James Morton	(England) Bristol City	End of season	

=== Loans out ===
Date from	Pos.	Nat.	Name	To	Date until	Ref.
10 August 2020	RB	(Northern Ireland)	Lee Hodson	(Scotland) Hamilton Academical	30 June 2021	
15 September 2020	MF	(England)	Toby Bancroft	(England) Margate		

=== Transfers out ===
Date	Pos.	Nat.	Name	To	Fee	Ref.
1 July 2020	AM	(England)	Ben Allen	(England) Bromley	Released	
1 July 2020	DM	(Antigua and Barbuda)	TJ Bramble	(England) Dover Athletic	Released	
1 July 2020	CM	(Republic of Ireland)	Mark Byrne	(Republic of Ireland) Shelbourne	Released	
1 July 2020	RM	(England)	Regan Charles-Cook	(Scotland) Ross County	Free transfer	
1 July 2020	DM	(Mali)	Ousseynou Cissé	(England) Leyton Orient	Released	
1 July 2020	FW	(England)	Jay Hards	(England) Whitstable Town	Released	
1 July 2020	MF	(England)	Tommy Lamb	(United States) Eckerd Tritons	Released	
1 July 2020	MF	(England)	Harry Laing	(United States) Eckerd Tritons	Released	
1 July 2020	LM	(England)	Ben Pringle	(England) Morecambe	Released	
21 July 2020	CB	(Germany)	Max Ehmer	(England) Bristol Rovers	Free transfer	
1 August 2020	CF	(France)	Mikael Mandron	(England) Crewe Alexandra	Free transfer	
6 August 2020	RB	(England)	Barry Fuller	(England) Dorking Wanderers	Mutual consent	
10 September 2020	CF	(England)	Brandon Hanlan	(England) Bristol Rovers	Free transfer	
28 January 2021	GK	(England)	Joe Walsh	(England) Queens Park Rangers	Undisclosed	
1 February 2021	CM	(England)	Jacob Mellis	(England) Southend United	Undisclosed	

== Pre-season ==
15 August 2020 Friendly	Colchester United	0–2	Gillingham	Colchester
13:30 BST		Report	O'Keefe 21'; Ogilvie 52'	Stadium: Colchester Community Stadium; Attendance: 0

18 August 2020 Friendly	Watford XI	1–3	Gillingham	St Albans
14:00 BST	14'	Report	Graham 2'; Willock 34'; Akinde 44'	Stadium: Watford Training Ground; Attendance: 0

22 August 2020 Friendly	Reading	2–1	Gillingham	Reading
13:30 BST	João 22'; Rinomhota 23'	Report	Akinde 25' (pen.)	Stadium: Madejski Stadium; Attendance: 0

25 August 2020 Friendly	Gillingham	0–0	Cambridge United	Gillingham
13:00 BST		Report		Stadium: Priestfield Stadium; Attendance: 0

29 August 2020 Friendly	Leyton Orient	1–0	Gillingham	Leyton
13:00 BST	Johnson 89'	Report		Stadium: Breyer Group Stadium; Attendance: 0

== Competitions ==
=== EFL League One ===
==== League table ====
Pos	Team	Pld	W	D	L	GF	GA	GD	Pts	Promotion, qualification or relegation
6	Oxford United	46	22	8	16	77	56	+21	74	Qualification for League One play-offs
7	Charlton Athletic	46	20	14	12	70	56	+14	74	
8	Portsmouth	46	21	9	16	65	51	+14	72	
9	Ipswich Town	46	19	12	15	46	46	0	69	
10	Gillingham	46	19	10	17	63	60	+3	67	
11	Accrington Stanley	46	18	13	15	63	68	−5	67	
12	Crewe Alexandra	46	18	12	16	56	61	−5	66	
13	Milton Keynes Dons	46	18	11	17	64	62	+2	65	
14	Doncaster Rovers	46	19	7	20	63	67	−4	64	

Source: EFL Official Website
Rules for classification: 1) Points; 2) Goal difference; 3) Number of goals scored; 4) Head-to-head results; 5) Wins; 6) Away goals; 7) Penalty points (sec 9.5); 8) 12-point sending off offences

==== Results summary ====
Overall								Home						Away					
Pld	W	D	L	GF	GA	GD	Pts	W	D	L	GF	GA	GD	W	D	L	GF	GA	GD
46	19	10	17	63	60	+3	67	10	5	8	31	30	+1	9	5	9	32	30	+2

Last updated: 9 May 2021.
Source: BBC

==== Matches ====
Win Draw Loss Postponed

The 2020–21 season fixtures were released on 21 August.

12 September 2020 1	Gillingham	0–2	Hull City	Gillingham
15:00 BST	Robertson (yellow card) 73'; O'Keefe (yellow card) 73'; Ogilvie (yellow card) 82'	Report	Lewis-Potter 3'; Honeyman (yellow card) 73'; Magennis 82'	Stadium: Priestfield Stadium; Attendance: 0 Referee: Andy Woolmer

19 September 2020 2	Wigan Athletic	2–3	Gillingham	Wigan
15:00 BST	Fox (yellow card) 13'; Garner 21'; Naismith 64'; Cameron (yellow card) 89'	Report	Graham 22', 30'; Eccles (yellow card) 34'; Coyle 62'	Stadium: DW Stadium; Attendance: 0 Referee: Tom Nield

26 September 2020 3	Gillingham	2–0	Blackpool	Gillingham
15:00 BST	Samuel 4', 49'	Report	Kaikai (yellow card) 75'; Robson (yellow card) 81'; Ekpiteta (yellow card) 84'	Stadium: Priestfield Stadium; Attendance: 0 Referee: Lee Swabey

3 October 2020 4	Shrewsbury Town	1–1	Gillingham	Shrewsbury
15:00 BST	Walker 12'; Pierre (yellow card) 56'; Norburn (yellow card) 75'	Report	Drysdale (yellow card) 73'; Graham 90+4'	Stadium: Montgomery Waters Meadow; Attendance: 0 Referee: James Adcock

10 October 2020 5	Gillingham	3–1	Oxford United	Gillingham
13:00 BST	Oliver 18'; Mellis 22'; Drysdale (yellow card) 24'; Graham (yellow card) 63' (goal) 70'	Report	Agyei 48'	Stadium: Priestfield Stadium; Attendance: 0 Referee: Thomas Bramall

17 October 2020 6	Milton Keynes Dons	2–0	Gillingham	Denbigh
13:00 BST	Jerome 19'; Thompson (yellow card) 33'; Morris 47'; Williams (yellow card) 56'; Kasumu (yellow card) 84'	Report	Robertson (yellow card) 56'	Stadium: Stadium MK; Attendance: 0 Referee: Neil Hair

20 October 2020 7	Gillingham	0–2	Portsmouth	Gillingham
18:30 BST	Maghoma (yellow card) 90+1'	Report	Marquis 15' (yellow card) 90+1'; Jacobs 17'; Johnson (yellow card) 29'	Stadium: Priestfield Stadium; Attendance: 0 Referee: David Rock

24 October 2020 8	Gillingham	0–2	Fleetwood Town	Gillingham
13:00 BST	Ogilvie (yellow card) 17' (yellow-red card) 83'; Akinde (yellow card) 41'; Samuel (yellow card) 70'; Graham (yellow card) 90+4'	Report	Madden 66'; Matete (yellow card) 87'; Evans 90+3'	Stadium: Priestfield Stadium; Attendance: 0 Referee: John Busby

27 October 2020 9	Ipswich Town	1–0	Gillingham	Ipswich
19:00 GMT	Dozzell (yellow card) 57'; Bishop 86' (yellow card) 88'	Report	MacDonald (yellow card) 27'	Stadium: Portman Road; Attendance: 0 Referee: Antony Coggins

31 October 2020 10	Gillingham	0–2	Sunderland	Gillingham
13:00 GMT	Jackson (yellow card) 40'; Graham (penalty missed) 59'; MacDonald (red card) 61'	Report	Gooch (yellow card) 23' (goal) 90+4'; Maguire 84' (pen.)	Stadium: Priestfield Stadium; Attendance: 0 Referee: Sam Purkiss

3 November 2020 11	Crewe Alexandra	0–1	Gillingham	Crewe
19:00 GMT	Offord (yellow card) 12'; Ng (yellow card) 76'; Mandron (yellow card) 83'	Report	Akinde 58'	Stadium: Alexandra Stadium; Attendance: 0 Referee: Kevin Johnson

21 November 2020 12	Gillingham	1–1	Charlton Athletic	Gillingham
13:00 GMT	Oliver (yellow card) 66'; Graham 73'; Dempsey (yellow card) 84'; Samuel (yellow card) 85'; McKenzie (yellow card) 90+4'	Report	Maddison (yellow card) 30'; Washington (penalty missed) 39'; Gilbey (yellow card) 81'; Aneke 82'; Maatsen (yellow card) 90+1'	Stadium: Priestfield Stadium; Attendance: 0 Referee: Robert Lewis

24 November 2020 13	Gillingham	2–1	AFC Wimbledon	Gillingham
18:00 GMT	Dempsey 3'; Samuel 57'	Report	Heneghan 28'	Stadium: Priestfield Stadium; Attendance: 0 Referee: Brett Huxtable

2 December 2020 14	Bristol Rovers	0–2	Gillingham	Horfield
19:00 GMT		Report	Oliver 26', 74'	Stadium: Memorial Stadium; Attendance: 0 Referee: Scott Oldham

5 December 2020 15	Gillingham	2–0	Swindon Town	Gillinham
13:00 GMT	Robertson (yellow card) 12'; Oliver 17'; McKenzie (yellow card) 63'; Coyle 80'	Report	Payne (yellow card) 25'; Odimayo (yellow card) 42'; Conroy (yellow card) 53'	Stadium: Priestfield Stadium; Attendance: 0 Referee: Neil Hair

12 December 2020 16	Doncaster Rovers	2–1	Gillingham	Doncaster
15:00 GMT	James 29'; Halliday 53'; Smith (yellow card) 86'	Report	Dempsey 51'	Stadium: Keepmoat Stadium; Attendance: 0 Referee: Trevor Kettle

15 December 2020 17	Gillingham	0–2	Accrington Stanley	Gillingham
17:30 GMT	O'Connor (yellow card) 73'	Report	Bishop 44'; Charles 64'; Butcher (yellow card) 90'	Stadium: Priestfield Stadium; Attendance: 0 Referee: Andy Woolmer

19 December 2020 18	Rochdale	1–4	Gillingham	Rochdale
13:00 GMT	O'Connell 90+2' (yellow card) 90+4'	Report	McKenzie 9'; Akinde 21', 47' (pen.); Ogilvie 45+1'	Stadium: Spotland; Attendance: 0 Referee: Ollie Yates

29 December 2020 19	Northampton Town	3–1	Gillingham	Northampton
19:45 GMT	Hoskins 31' (pen.); Rose 35'; Sheehan 47'; McWilliams (yellow card) 82'; Ashley-Seal (yellow card) 84'	Report	Dempsey 45'	Stadium: PTS Academy Stadium; Attendance: 0 Referee: Carl Boyeson

2 January 2021 20	Plymouth Argyle	1–0	Gillingham	Plymouth
15:00 GMT	Jephcott 33'; Nouble (yellow card) 86'	Report	Jackson (yellow card) 68'; Drysdale (yellow card) 88'	Stadium: Home Park; Attendance: 0 Referee: Sam Allison

9 January 2021 21	Gillingham	0–1	Burton Albion	Gillingham
14:00 GMT		Report	Carter 33'	Stadium: Priestfield Stadium; Attendance: 0 Referee: Brett Huxtable

16 January 2021 22	Accrington Stanley	0–1	Gillingham	Accrington
15:00 GMT	Sykes (yellow card) 45'; Nottingham (yellow card) 62'	Report	Dempsey 45+1'; Jackson (yellow card) 80'	Stadium: Wham Stadium; Attendance: 0 Referee: Darren Drysdale

23 January 2021 23	Gilligham	2–2	Rochdale	Gillingham
15:00 GMT	Oliver 43', (yellow card) 64'; Akinde 90+2'	Report	Lund (yellow card) 11'; Keohane 69', 75'; Baah (yellow card) 85'	Stadium: Priestfield Stadium; Attendance: 0 Referee: Christopher Pollard

26 January 2021 24	Gillingham	4–1	Crewe Alexandra	Gillingham
18:00 GMT	Graham 11' (pen.); Lee 38', 62'; Dempsey 45'; Oliver (yellow card) 46'; Cundy (yellow card) 67'; Akinde (yellow card) 90+3'	Report	Porter 80'; Johnson (yellow card) 90+4'	Stadium: Priestfield Stadium; Attendance: 0 Referee: Alan Young

30 January 2021 25	Sunderland	2–2	Gillingham	Sunderland
13:00 GMT	McGeady 6'; Leadbitter (penalty missed) 43' 43'	Report	MacDonald 28'; Slattery (yellow card) 87'; Graham 90'	Stadium: Stadium of Light; Attendance: 0 Referee: Oliver Langford

5 February 2021 26	Gillingham	0–3	Lincoln City	Gillingham
18:00 GMT	Slattery (yellow card) 40'; Oliver (yellow card) 41'; Akinde (yellow card) 78'; Ogilvie (yellow card) 90+9'	Report	McGrandles 14', 64'; Grant (yellow card) 43', (goal) 59' (pen.); Bridcutt (yellow card) 76'	Stadium: Priestfield Stadium; Attendance: 0 Referee: Sam Barrott

13 February 2021 27	Charlton Athletic	2–3	Gillingham	Charlton
15:00 GMT	Aneke 15', (yellow card) 68' (yellow-red card) 70'; Stockley 52'; Oshilaja (yellow card) 81'; Pearce (yellow card) 90+3' Lee Bowyer (yellow card)	Report	Lee 1'; Ogilvie 37'; Tucker (yellow card) 79'; McKenzie (yellow card) 80'; Dempsey 86'	Stadium: The Valley; Attendance: 0 Referee: Kevin Johnson

16 February 2021 28	Gillingham	1–3	Peterborough United	Gillingham
18:00 GMT	Akinde 32' (pen.), (yellow card) 65'; Slattery (yellow card) 48'; McKenzie (yellow card) 79'	Report	Kent (yellow card) 44'; Clarke-Harris 47', (yellow card) 64', (goal) 67'; Dembélé 52'; Butler (yellow card) 77'	Stadium: Priestfield Stadium; Attendance: 0 Referee: Charles Breakspear

20 February 2021 29	Gillingham	2–0	Bristol Rovers	Gillingham
13:00 GMT	Akinde 67', (penalty missed) 73', 90+1'	Report	Hanlan (yellow card) 52'; Ayunga (yellow card) 70'; McCormick (yellow card) 84'; Baldwin (yellow card) 89'	Stadium: Priestfield Stadium; Attendance: 0 Referee: James Oldham

23 February 2021 30	AFC Wimbledon	1–0	Gillingham	Wimbledon
18:30 GMT	Rudoni 89'	Report	O'Keefe (yellow card) 90+1'	Stadium: Plough Lane; Attendance: 0 Referee: Paul Howard

27 February 2021 31	Portsmouth	1–1	Gillingham	Milton
15:00 GMT	Raggett 32'; Mnoga (yellow card) 82'	Report	Oliver 40'; O'Keefe (yellow card) 76'	Stadium: Fratton Park; Attendance: 0 Referee: Tim Robinson

2 March 2021 32	Gillingham	3–2	Milton Keynes Dons	Gillingham
18:00 GMT	Graham 28' (pen.); O'Keefe (yellow card) 38'; Oliver 44'; Ogilvie 74'	Report	Grigg 4'; O'Hora 45+6'	Stadium: Priestfield Stadium; Attendance: 0 Referee: Sam Purkiss

6 March 2021 33	Gillingham	3–1	Ipswich Town	Gillingham
13:00 GMT	Tucker 7'; Oliver 73', 80'	Report	Chambers 65'; Norwood (yellow card) 82'	Stadium: Priestfield Stadium; Attendance: 0 Referee: Graham Salisbury

9 March 2021 34	Fleetwood Town	1–0	Gillingham	Fleetwood
19:45 GMT	Vassell 2' (pen.), (yellow card) 90+3'	Report	O'Keefe (yellow card) 90+3'; Oliver (yellow card) 90+5'	Stadium: Highbury Stadium; Attendance: 0 Referee: Marc Edwards

13 March 2021 35	Swindon Town	1–3	Gillingham	Swindon
13:00 GMT	Pitman 41'; Twine (yellow card) 76'	Report	Ogilvie (yellow card) 47'; Oliver 59', 63'; Dempsey 68'; O'Keefe (yellow card) 76'	Stadium: The County Ground; Attendance: 0 Referee: James Bell

16 March 2021 36	Lincoln City	0–3	Gillingham	Lincoln
19:00 GMT	Johnson (yellow card) 69'; Edun (yellow card) 72'	Report	Oliver 10'; Dempsey 20'; O'Keefe (yellow card) 49'; Tucker (yellow card) 63'; Akinde (yellow card) 76'; Graham 87' (pen.)	Stadium: LNER Stadium; Attendance: 0 Referee: Ross Joyce

20 March 2021 37	Gillingham	2–2	Doncaster Rovers	Gillingham
15:00 GMT	Graham 2'; Oliver 4'	Report	Anderson 19'; Coppinger 23'; Okenabirhie (yellow card) 74'	Stadium: Priestfield Stadium; Referee: Will Finnie

27 March 2021 38	Hull City	1–1	Gillingham	Kingston upon Hull
15:00 GMT	Eaves 9'; Greaves (yellow card) 37'	Report	O'Keefe (yellow card) 64'; Lee 67'; MacDonald (yellow card) 71'; O'Connor (yellow card) 90+7'	Stadium: KCOM Stadium; Attendance: 0 Referee: Martin Coy

31 March 2021 39	Gillingham	1–0	Wigan Athletic	Gillingham
17:30 GMT	O'Keefe (yellow card) 49'; Dempsey (yellow card) 73'; Oliver 76'; Samuel (yellow card) 85'	Report	Proctor (yellow card) 51'; Robinson (yellow card) 90+3'; Tilt (yellow card) 90+6'	Stadium: Priestfield Stadium; Attendance: 0 Referee: Chris Sarginson

5 April 2021 40	Blackpool	4–1	Gillingham	Blackpool
15:00 BST	Yates 5', 20'; Kaikai 30'; Embleton (yellow card) 39', (goal) 61'	Report	Graham 14'; O'Keefe (yellow card) 34'	Stadium: Bloomfield Road; Attendance: 0 Referee: Darren Drysdale

10 April 2021 41	Gillingham	0–0	Shrewsbury Town	Gillingham
15:00 BST	O'Keefe (yellow card) 22'; Jackson (yellow card) 68'; Tucker (yellow card) 77'	Report	Love (yellow card) 79'	Stadium: Priestfield Stadium; Attendance: 0 Referee: Trevor Kettle

17 April 2021 42	Oxford United	3–2	Gillingham	Oxford
17:30 BST	Winnall 74'; Long 84', 90+3'; Taylor (yellow card) 90+6'	Report	Oliver 40'; Jackson (yellow card) 66'; Cundy 72'	Stadium: The Kassam Stadium; Attendance: 0 Referee: Robert Lewis

20 April 2021 43	Peterborough United	0–1	Gillingham	Peterborough
19:45 BST	Thompson (yellow card) 18'; Szmodics (yellow card) 21'; Dembélé (yellow card) 51'	Report	Ogilvie 15'; MacDonald (yellow card) 23'; Dempsey (yellow card) 85'	Stadium: Weston Homes Stadium; Attendance: 0 Referee: Sam Allison

24 April 2021 44	Gillingham	2–2	Northampton Town	Gillingham
15:00 BST	Oliver 11'; O'Keefe (yellow card) 32'; Cundy (yellow card) 42'; Lee 68'; Samuel (yellow card) 71'	Report	Watson (yellow card) 14'; Mills (yellow card) 40'; Morris (yellow card) 55'; Edmondson 79'; Horsfall 83'	Stadium: Priestfield Stadium; Attendance: 0 Referee: Carl Brook

1 May 2021 45	Burton Albion	1–1	Gillingham	Gillingham
15:00 BST	Graham 37'; MacDonald (yellow card) 39'	Report	Taylor (yellow card) 13'; Hemmings (yellow card) 45+1'; Earl (yellow card) 85'; Broom 90' (yellow card) 90+1'; Fondop-Talom (yellow card) 90+1'	Stadium: Pirelli Stadium; Attendance: 0 Referee: Ben Toner

9 May 2021 46	Gillingham	1–0	Plymouth Argyle	Gillingham
12:00 BST	Oliver 28'; O'Keefe (yellow card) 56'; Dempsey (yellow card) 70'	Report	Reeves (yellow card) 55'	Stadium: Priestfield Stadium; Attendance: 0 Referee: Alan Young

=== FA Cup ===
The draw for the first round was made on Monday 26, October. The second round draw was revealed on Monday, 9 November by Danny Cowley.

Win Draw Loss

7 November 2020 First round	Gillingham	3–2	Woking	Gillingham
15:00 GMT	Graham (yellow card) 9'; Samuel 59', 68'; Oliver 79'	Report	Kretzschmar 23' (yellow card) 70'; Davison (yellow card) 53' (goal) 56'	Stadium: Priestfield Stadium; Attendance: 0 Referee: Chris Sarginson

28 November 2020 Second round	Gillingham	2–3	Exeter City	Gillingham
13:00 GMT	Oliver 21'; Samuel 80'	Report	Law 29'; Atangana (yellow card) 33'; Randall 35', 40'; Sparkes (yellow card) 76'	Stadium: Priestfield Stadium; Attendance: 0 Referee: Alan Young

=== EFL Cup ===
Win Draw Loss

The first round draw was made on 18 August, live on Sky Sports, by Paul Merson. The draw for both the second and third round were confirmed on September 6, live on Sky Sports by Phil Babb.

5 September 2020 First round	Gillingham	1–0	Southend United	Gillingham
13:00 BST	Ogilvie 27'; Jackson (yellow card) 40' (yellow-red card) 58'; O'Keefe (yellow card) 60'	Report	Hobson (yellow card) 25'; White (yellow card) 47'; Hutchinson (yellow card) 56'	Stadium: Priestfield Stadium; Attendance: 0 Referee: Christopher Pollard

15 September 2020 Second round	Gillingham	1–1 (5–4 p)	Coventry City	Gillingham
18:00 BST	Robertson (yellow card) 47'; Graham 90+4' (pen.)	Report	Bapaga (yellow card) 22'; Bakayoko (yellow card) 42'; Biamou 61'; Mason (yellow card) 81'	Stadium: Priestfield Stadium; Attendance: 0 Referee: Craig Hicks
	Penalties
	Ogilvie (penalty scored); Graham (penalty scored); Robertson (penalty scored); Mellis (penalty scored); Coyle (penalty scored)		Walker (penalty scored); Biamou (penalty scored); Sheaf (penalty scored); Rose (penalty missed); Eccles (penalty scored)

23 September 2020 Third round	Stoke City	1–0	Gillingham	Stoke-on-Trent
19:00 BST	Campbell 37'; McClean (yellow card) 90'	Report	Maghoma (yellow card) 90'; Jackson (yellow card) 90'	Stadium: Bet365 Stadium; Attendance: 0 Referee: David Webb

=== EFL Trophy ===
Win Draw Loss

The regional group stage draw was confirmed on 18 August. The second round draw was made by Matt Murray on 20 November, at St Andrew's.

Pos	Div	Team	Pld	W	PW	PL	L	GF	GA	GD	Pts	Qualification
1	ACA	Arsenal U21	3	2	1	0	0	5	3	+2	8	Advance to Round 2
2	L1	Gillingham	3	1	0	1	1	3	4	−1	4	Advance to Round 2
3	L2	Crawley Town	3	1	0	0	2	4	4	0	3	
4	L1	Ipswich Town	3	1	0	0	2	3	4	−1	3	

Source: EFL.com

8 September 2020 Group stage	Gillingham	2–1	Crawley Town	Gillingham
17:30 BST	Coyle 40'; Oliver 50'; Woods (yellow card) 66'	Report	McNerney (yellow card) 75'; Ferguson 78'	Stadium: Priestfield Stadium; Attendance: 0 Referee: Paul Howard

6 October 2020 Group stage	Ipswich Town	2–0	Gillingham	Ipswich
19:00 BST	Dobra 57'; Folami (yellow card) 68', (goal) 75'; Gibbs (yellow card) 83'	Report	Maghoma (yellow card) 53'; Akinde (yellow card) 56'; Eccles (yellow card) 89'	Stadium: Portman Road; Attendance: 0 Referee: Charles Breakspear

10 November 2020 Group stage	Gillingham	1–1 (2–4 p)	Arsenal U21	Gillingham
19:00 GMT	Eccles (yellow card) 36'; Coyle 56'	Report	Cîrjan 6'; López (yellow card) 43'; Saliba (yellow card) 75'	Stadium: Priestfield Stadium; Attendance: 0 Referee: Will Finnie
	Penalties
	Coyle (penalty scored); Samuel (penalty missed); McKenzie (penalty missed); Eccles (penalty scored)		Balogun (penalty scored); Moller (penalty scored); Cottrell (penalty scored); Cîrjan (penalty scored)

8 December 2020 Second round	Cambridge United	2–0	Gillingham	Cambridge
19:45 GMT	Mullin 67' (pen.); Hannant 79'	Report	Woods (yellow card) 37'	Stadium: Abbey Stadium; Attendance: 724; Referee: David Rock
