= Henry Woods (footballer) =

English footballer

Personal information
- Full name: Henry Woods
- Date of birth: 7 September 1999 (age 27)
- Position: Midfielder

Youth career
- Southampton
- Gillingham

Senior career*
Years	Team	Apps	(Gls)
2018–2022	Gillingham	4	(0)
2018–2019	→ Sittingbourne (loan)	20	(2)
2019	→ Concord Rangers (loan)	8	(0)
2019–2020	→ Concord Rangers (loan)	4	(0)
2021–2022	→ Dover Athletic (loan)	39	(1)
2022–2023	Maidstone United	4	(0)
2024–2025	Dubai City		
- * Club domestic league appearances and goals as of 17:00, 4 May 2023 (UTC)

Henry Woods (born 7 September 1999) is an English professional footballer who plays as a midfielder.

== Career ==
Woods joined Southampton's academy aged 6, and remained there until the under-16s. He then joined Gillingham's youth setup, before turning professional with the Kent side in January 2018, at the same time as Jack Tucker and Ryan Huckle. He made his debut on 13 November 2018 in the EFL Trophy.

On 5 December 2018, Woods joined Sittingbourne on a one-month loan deal alongside his teammate from Gillingham, Danny Divine. On 10 January 2019, Sittingbourne announced that they had extended both players' loan deals for the rest of the season.

He was offered a new contract by Gillingham at the end of the 2018–19 season. He moved on loan to Concord Rangers in October 2019. The loan ended a month later, but he returned to the club for a second loan spell in December 2019.

Woods was to be released by Gillingham at the end of the 2019–20 season, but then signed a contract on 4 September 2020 to stay at the club for another year. Woods made his league debut for the club on 10 October 2020 as a 90th minute substitute in a 3–1 win over Oxford United.

On 27 July 2021, Woods signed a new contract with the club and joined National League side Dover Athletic on loan until 10 January 2022. In November 2021, Woods scored a first career goal as he equalised for a second time in a match where Dover were defeated 3–2 by Wealdstone. In January 2022, Woods' loan deal was extended until the end of the season.

On 27 June 2022, Woods joined newly promoted National League club Maidstone United on a free transfer. Following their relegation at the end of the 2022–23 season, he was announced to be leaving the club upon the expiration of his contract.

Following his release from Maidstone, Woods joined Dubai City of the UAE First Division League, as a player-coach.

== Career statistics ==
As of end of 2021–22 season

Appearances and goals by club, season and competition
Club	Season	League			FA Cup		League Cup		Other		Total	
Club	Season	Division	Apps	Goals	Apps	Goals	Apps	Goals	Apps	Goals	Apps	Goals
Gillingham	2018–19	League One	0	0	0	0	0	0	1 (Note: Appearance(s) in EFL Trophy)	0	1	0
Gillingham	2019–20	League One	0	0	0	0	1	0	2	0	3	0
Gillingham	2020–21	League One	4	0	0	0	1	0	4	0	9	0
Gillingham	2021–22	League One	0	0	0	0	0	0	0	0	0	0
Gillingham	Total		4	0	0	0	2	0	7	0	13	0
Sittingbourne (loan)	2018–19	Isthmian League South East Division	20	2	—		—		—		20	2
Concord Rangers (loan)	2019–20	National League South	12	0	0	0	—		1 (Note: Appearance(s) in FA Trophy)	0	13	0
Dover Athletic (loan)	2021–22	National League	39	1	0	0	—		0	0	39	1
Career Total			75	3	0	0	2	0	8	0	85	3
