= Maghoma =

Maghoma is a surname. Notable people with the surname include:

- Christian Maghoma (born 1997), Congolese footballer
- Jacques Maghoma (born 1987), Congolese footballer
- Paris Maghoma (born 2001), English footballer
