= Vadaine Oliver =

English footballer (born 1991)

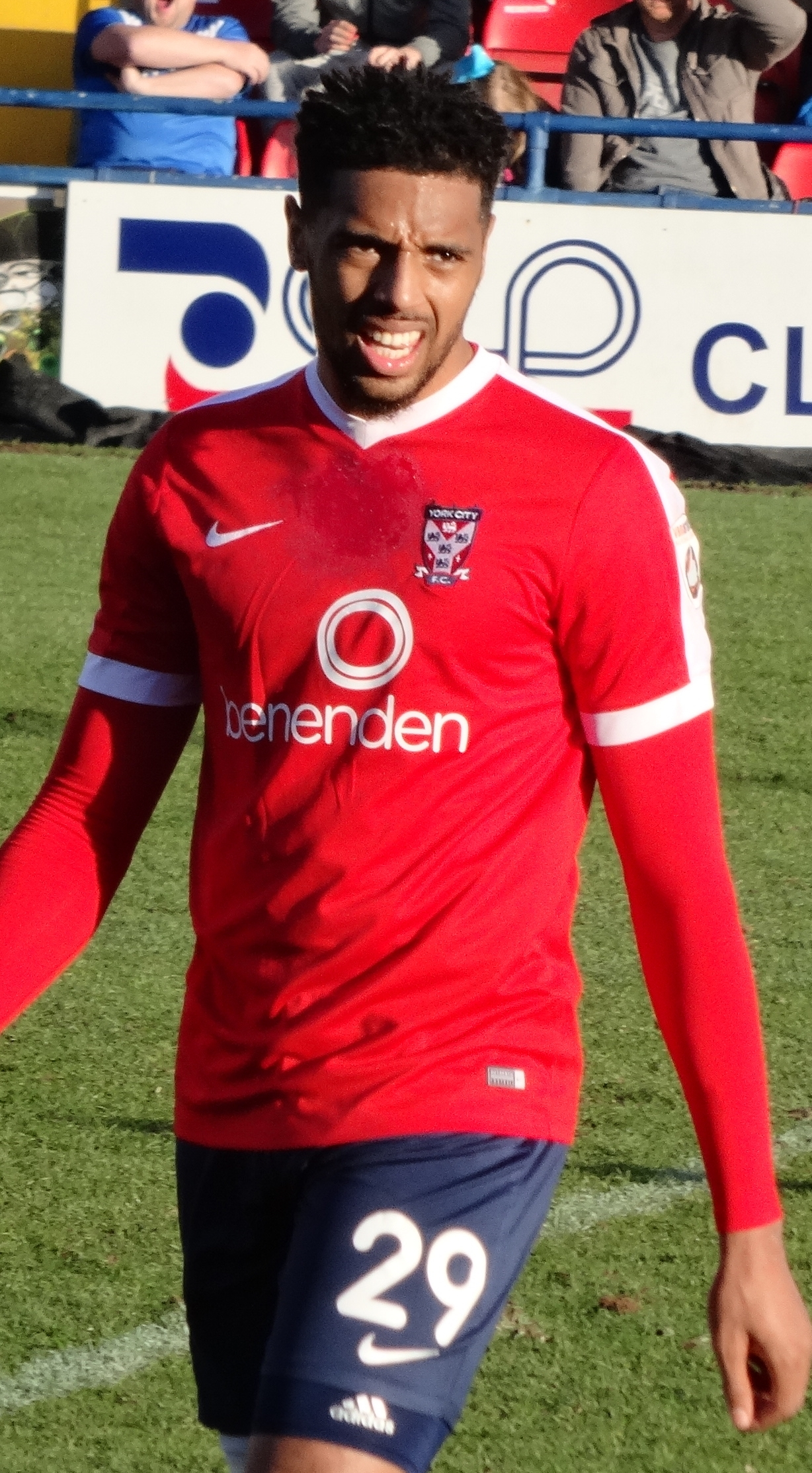
- Oliver playing for York City in 2017

Personal information
- Full name: Vadaine Aston James Oliver
- Date of birth: 21 October 1991 (age 35)
- Place of birth: Sheffield, England
- Height: 6 ft 2 in (1.88 m)
- Position: Striker

Youth career
- –2010: Sheffield Wednesday

Senior career*
Years	Team	Apps	(Gls)
2010–2012	Sheffield Wednesday	0	(0)
2012–2013	Lincoln City	37	(11)
2013–2015	Crewe Alexandra	34	(3)
2014–2015	→ Mansfield Town (loan)	30	(7)
2015–2017	York City	55	(14)
2016–2017	→ Notts County (loan)	19	(1)
2017–2019	Morecambe	64	(7)
2019–2020	Northampton Town	30	(4)
2020–2022	Gillingham	82	(27)
2022–2025	Bradford City	48	(3)
2024	→ Stevenage (loan)	14	(0)
2025	→ Shrewsbury Town (loan)	13	(2)
2025–2026	Hartlepool United	21	(4)
- * Club domestic league appearances and goals as of 23:08, 25 April 2026 (UTC)

Vadaine Aston James Oliver (born 21 October 1991) is an English professional footballer who last played as a striker for Hartlepool United.

He has played in the English Football League for Crewe Alexandra, Mansfield Town, York City, Notts County, Morecambe, Northampton Town and Gillingham.

== Career ==
=== Early life and career ===
Oliver was born in Sheffield, South Yorkshire. He began his career with Sheffield Wednesday's youth system, and signed a professional contract in 2010. He was released by the club in May 2012, before joining Conference Premier club Lincoln City on 4 August 2012 on a one-year contract. He scored 13 goals for Lincoln in the 2012–13 season, 11 of which came in the league.

He attracted interest from Football League clubs and signed for League One club Crewe Alexandra on 10 June 2013 on a two-year contract for an undisclosed fee. He made his debut as an 89th-minute substitute in a 3–3 draw with Rotherham United on 3 August 2013. Oliver scored his first Crewe goal after sliding in from a Brad Inman cross in the 15th minute of a 2–2 draw at home to Peterborough United on 7 September 2013.

=== York City ===
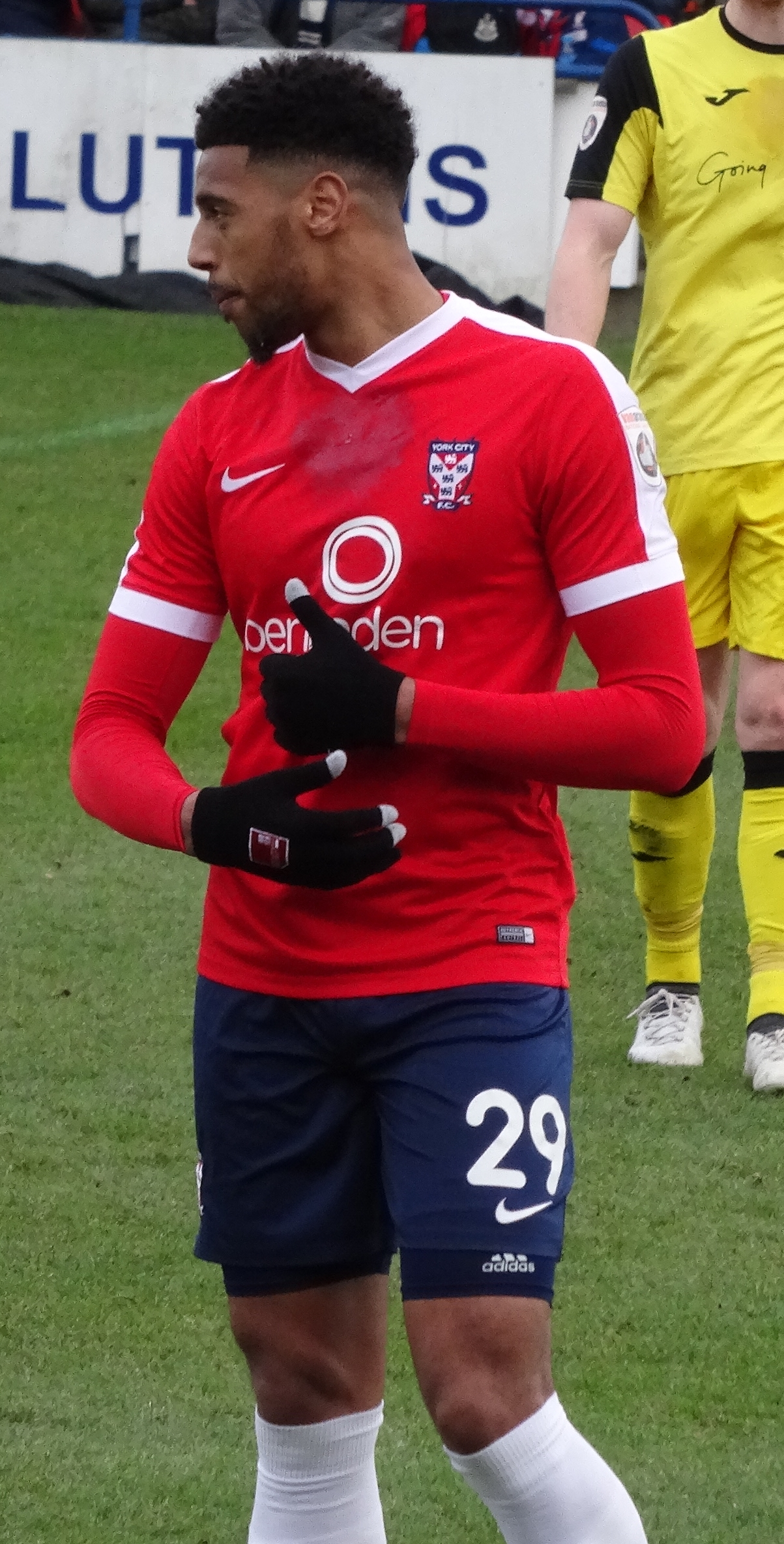
Oliver playing for York City in 2017

Oliver signed for League Two club York City on 20 May 2015 on a three-year contract. He made his debut when starting York's 3–0 away defeat by Wycombe Wanderers on 8 August 2015, the opening match of 2015–16. His first goal for the club came in the 59th minute of a 3–0 away win over Newport County on 5 September 2015, with a close-range shot after James Berrett's shot was saved. Early in the season, Oliver showed a desire to flick on aerial balls, but once that desire seemingly disappeared he "cut a lethargic figure up front", according to Dave Flett of The Press. He finished the season as York's top scorer with 10 goals from 42 appearances, although he only scored once in his last 19 appearances. Following York's relegation to the National League after finishing 24th in League Two, Oliver was transfer listed by the club.

On 2 August 2016, Oliver joined League Two club Notts County on loan until 7 January 2017. He debuted four days later as a 56th-minute substitute for Jon Stead in a 2–0 defeat away to Yeovil Town. He scored his first goal for the club in a 2–1 loss against Morecambe on 11 October 2016.

On 21 May 2017, Oliver started as York beat Macclesfield Town 3–2 at Wembley Stadium in the 2017 FA Trophy final, scoring in the 22nd minute with a three-yard shot from Sean Newton's low cross. He finished 2016–17 with 10 goals from 23 appearances for York as the club was relegated to the National League North after finishing in 21st place in the National League. He was transfer listed at the end of the season at his own request.

=== Morecambe and Northampton Town ===
Oliver signed for League Two club Morecambe on 30 June 2017 for an undisclosed fee, on a contract of undisclosed length. He scored his first goal for Morecambe in a 4–3 EFL Cup defeat away to Barnsley on 8 August 2017. He was released by Morecambe at the end of the 2018–19 season.

Oliver signed for League Two club Northampton Town on 3 July 2019 on a one-year contract.

=== Gillingham ===
Oliver signed for League One club Gillingham on 5 August 2020. He scored his first goal for Gillingham in a 2–1 home win over Crawley Town on 8 September in the EFL Trophy with a 52nd-minute header. After scoring eight goals in eight games, on 9 April 2021, Oliver was awarded the League One Player of the Month award for March 2021. He finished the 2020–21 season as the Kent side's top goal scorer, with 20 goals in all competitions.

Oliver was also top scorer the following season with 11 goals in all competitions, but could not prevent Gillingham's relegation to League Two. Oliver announced on his Twitter account that he would be leaving the Kent side at the end of his contract.

=== Bradford City ===
On 10 July 2022, Oliver signed for League Two club Bradford City on a three-year deal.

On 17 January 2024, he joined League One club Stevenage on loan for the remainder of the 2023–24 season.

Oliver joined League One club Shrewsbury Town in January on a loan for the remainder of the season. He scored twice and assisted once in 13 appearances as the club were relegated. He was released by Bradford City at the end of the 2024–25 season.

=== Hartlepool United ===
On 11 September 2025, Oliver signed for National League club Hartlepool United. He scored four times in his eight appearances before suffering a serious knee injury in late October 2025. He returned to the side on 25 February as a stoppage time substitute in a 3–1 win against Carlisle United. On 6 May 2026 the club announced he was being released.

== Career statistics ==
As of match played 25 April 2026

Appearances and goals by club, season and competition
Club	Season	League			FA Cup		League Cup		Other		Total	
Club	Season	Division	Apps	Goals	Apps	Goals	Apps	Goals	Apps	Goals	Apps	Goals
Lincoln City	2012–13	Conference Premier	37	11	4	2	—		1 (Note: Appearance(s) in FA Trophy)	0	42	13
Crewe Alexandra	2013–14	League One	25	2	2	0	1	0	2 (Note: Appearance(s) in Football League Trophy)	0	30	2
Crewe Alexandra	2014–15	League One	9	1	—		2	0	1	0	12	1
Crewe Alexandra	Total		34	3	2	0	3	0	3	0	42	3
Mansfield Town (loan)	2014–15	League Two	30	7	2	0	—		—		32	7
York City	2015–16	League Two	37	7	1	1	2	0	2	2	42	10
York City	2016–17	National League	18	7	—		—		5	3	23	10
York City	Total		55	14	1	1	2	0	7	5	65	20
Notts County (loan)	2016–17	League Two	19	1	3	0	1	0	2 (Note: Appearance(s) in EFL Trophy)	0	25	1
Morecambe	2017–18	League Two	34	3	2	0	1	1	1	0	38	4
Morecambe	2018–19	League Two	30	4	2	0	0	0	1	1	33	5
Morecambe	Total		64	7	4	0	1	1	2	1	71	9
Northampton Town	2019–20	League Two	30	4	5	3	0	0	5 (Note: Two appearances in EFL Trophy, three appearances and one goal in League Two play-offs)	1	40	8
Gillingham	2020–21	League One	43	17	2	2	3	0	2	1	50	20
Gillingham	2021–22	League One	39	10	1	0	2	1	1	0	43	11
Gillingham	Total		82	27	3	2	5	1	3	1	93	31
Bradford City	2022–23	League Two	30	3	1	0	2	0	4	1	37	4
Bradford City	2023–24	League Two	6	0	0	0	0	0	3	1	9	1
Bradford City	2024–25	League Two	12	0	2	1	1	0	3	1	18	2
Bradford City	Total		48	3	3	1	3	0	10	3	64	7
Stevenage (loan)	2023–24	League One	14	0	0	0	0	0	0	0	14	0
Shrewsbury Town (loan)	2024–25	League One	13	2	0	0	0	0	0	0	13	2
Hartlepool United	2025–26	National League	21	4	2	0	0	0	0	0	23	4
Career total			447	83	29	9	15	2	33	11	524	105

== Honours ==
York City

- FA Trophy: 2016–17

Northampton Town

- EFL League Two play-offs: 2020

Individual

- EFL League One Player of the Month: March 2021
- Gillingham Players' Player of the Season: 2020–21
