= Matty Willock =

Association football player

Personal information
- Full name: Matthew Anthony Willock
- Date of birth: 20 August 1996 (age 30)
- Place of birth: Waltham Forest, England
- Height: 5 ft 8 in (1.72 m)
- Position: Central midfielder

Youth career
- Arsenal
- 2012–2017: Manchester United

Senior career*
Years	Team	Apps	(Gls)
2017–2019	Manchester United	0	(0)
2017–2018	→ FC Utrecht (loan)	3	(0)
2017–2018	→ Jong FC Utrecht (loan)	6	(0)
2018	→ St Johnstone (loan)	11	(1)
2018	→ St Mirren (loan)	12	(0)
2019	→ Crawley Town (loan)	11	(0)
2019–2021	Gillingham	18	(0)
2021–2022	Salford City	12	(2)

International career
2021	Montserrat	2	(0)
- * Club domestic league appearances and goals

Matthew Anthony Willock (born 20 August 1996) is a former professional footballer who played as a central midfielder. Born in England, he represents the Montserrat national team.

Willock began his football career with Arsenal before moving to Manchester United, where he spent seven years. He went on loan to Dutch team FC Utrecht in 2017, and Scottish clubs St Johnstone and St Mirren the following year. In 2019, he went on loan to Crawley Town before being released by United, subsequently being signed by Gillingham, where he spent two years, then Salford City, where he remained for only one season. He retired after the end of the 2021–22 season.

== Club career ==
=== Early career ===
Willock had a spell with the Arsenal youth ranks up until 2011, when he was released at the age of 15. He subsequently had trials with Championship team Reading and Premier League team Sunderland prior to joining Manchester United in 2012.

=== Manchester United ===
He first featured for the academy at the 2012 Northern Ireland Youth Soccer Tournament before playing for the Under-18s domestically, the Under-19s in the UEFA Youth League and then the Under-23s. He appeared on the senior squad's bench twice during the 2016–17 season, being an unused substitute in home matches against West Bromwich Albion and Crystal Palace. He signed a new two-year contract in August 2017, prior to leaving on loan. On 7 June 2019, it was announced that, on 30 June, Willock would leave the club following the expiration of his contract.

==== FC Utrecht loan ====
On 31 August 2017, Willock was loaned out to Eredivisie side FC Utrecht for the season. He was assigned the number 26 shirt. However, his first match in Utrecht colours came for the reserve team in the Eerste Divisie, making his professional debut in a 4–1 loss at home to De Graafschap. On 20 September, Willock made his first start for the senior squad in a KNVB Cup first round tie against Ajax Amateurs at the Amsterdam Arena, he scored the fifth goal in a 6–0 victory. His Eredivisie debut came on 1 October in an away draw versus Vitesse. After five first-team appearances and one goal for FC Utrecht in all competitions, Willock's loan was terminated on 31 January 2018.

==== St Johnstone loan ====
On 31 January 2018, Willock completed a loan move to Scottish Premiership team St Johnstone until June. He made his debut for St Johnstone in a 1–0 defeat to Heart of Midlothian on 3 February. His first goal for St Johnstone – and his first professional goal in British football – arrived on 31 March during a loss away against Aberdeen.

==== St Mirren loan ====
In July 2018, Willock moved on loan to Scottish Premiership club St Mirren. After featuring fourteen times in league and cup for St Mirren, Willock had his loan terminated on 21 December.

==== Crawley Town loan ====
On 31 January 2019, Willock joined EFL League Two side Crawley Town on loan for the remainder of the 2018–19 season. Having appeared in eleven matches for Crawley as they finished nineteenth, he returned to his parent club on 8 May.

=== Gillingham ===
Willock completed a move to Gillingham of EFL League One on 13 June 2019. He scored on his unofficial debut for the club, netting in a nine-goal pre-season victory away to Faversham Town on 6 July. After suffering a hamstring injury soon after, Willock made his Gillingham debut on 31 August during a 5–0 victory over Bolton Wanderers. At the end of the 2020–21 season, it was announced that the Kent club would not be renewing Willock's contract and he would therefore be departing after two seasons.

=== Salford City ===
After spending two weeks on trial, he signed for League Two club Salford City on 4 August. Starting in central midfield on his début on 7 August, he scored Salford's equaliser in their opening game of the season in a 1–1 draw against Leyton Orient, described by Sky Sports as a "30-yard thunderbolt". He was released by Salford at the end of the 2021–22 season.

== International career ==
Willock was called up to the Montserrat squad for 2022 FIFA World Cup qualification in June 2021. He debuted with Montserrat in a 4–0 2022 FIFA World Cup qualification win over the US Virgin Islands on 2 June 2021.

== Personal life ==
He has two brothers, Chris and Joe, who are also professional footballers. All three brothers shared a pitch when Manchester United played a reserve game against Arsenal in May 2017. Paul Scholes, Patrick Vieira and Kaká were his heroes growing up.

== Career statistics ==
=== Club ===
As of end of 2020–21 season.

Appearances and goals by club, season and competition
Club	Season	League			Cup		League Cup		Continental		Other		Total	
Club	Season	Division	Apps	Goals	Apps	Goals	Apps	Goals	Apps	Goals	Apps	Goals	Apps	Goals
Manchester United	2016–17	Premier League	0	0	0	0	0	0	0	0	0	0	0	0
Manchester United	2017–18	Premier League	0	0	0	0	0	0	0	0	0	0	0	0
Manchester United	2018–19	Premier League	0	0	0	0	0	0	0	0	0	0	0	0
Manchester United	Total		0	0	0	0	0	0	0	0	0	0	0	0
FC Utrecht (loan)	2017–18	Eredivisie	3	0	2	1	—		—		0	0	5	1
Jong FC Utrecht (loan)	2017–18	Eerste Divisie	6	0	—		—		—		0	0	6	0
St Johnstone (loan)	2017–18	Premiership	11	1	1	0	—		—		0	0	12	1
St Mirren (loan)	2018–19	Premiership	12	0	0	0	2	0	0	0	0	0	14	0
Crawley Town (loan)	2018–19	League Two	11	0	—		—		—		—		11	0
Gillingham	2019–20	League One	7	0	1	0	0	0	—		—		8	0
Gillingham	2020–21	League One	11	0	0	0	3	0	–		4 (Note: Appearances in the EFL Trophy)	0	18	0
Gillingham	Total		18	0	1	0	3	0	0	0	4	0	26	0
Career total			61	1	4	1	5	0	0	0	4	0	74	2

=== International ===
As of match played 8 June 2021

Appearances and goals by national team and year
National team	Year	Apps	Goals
Montserrat
Montserrat	2021	2	0
Total		2	0
