= Thomas O'Connor (footballer) =

Irish association footballer (born 1999)

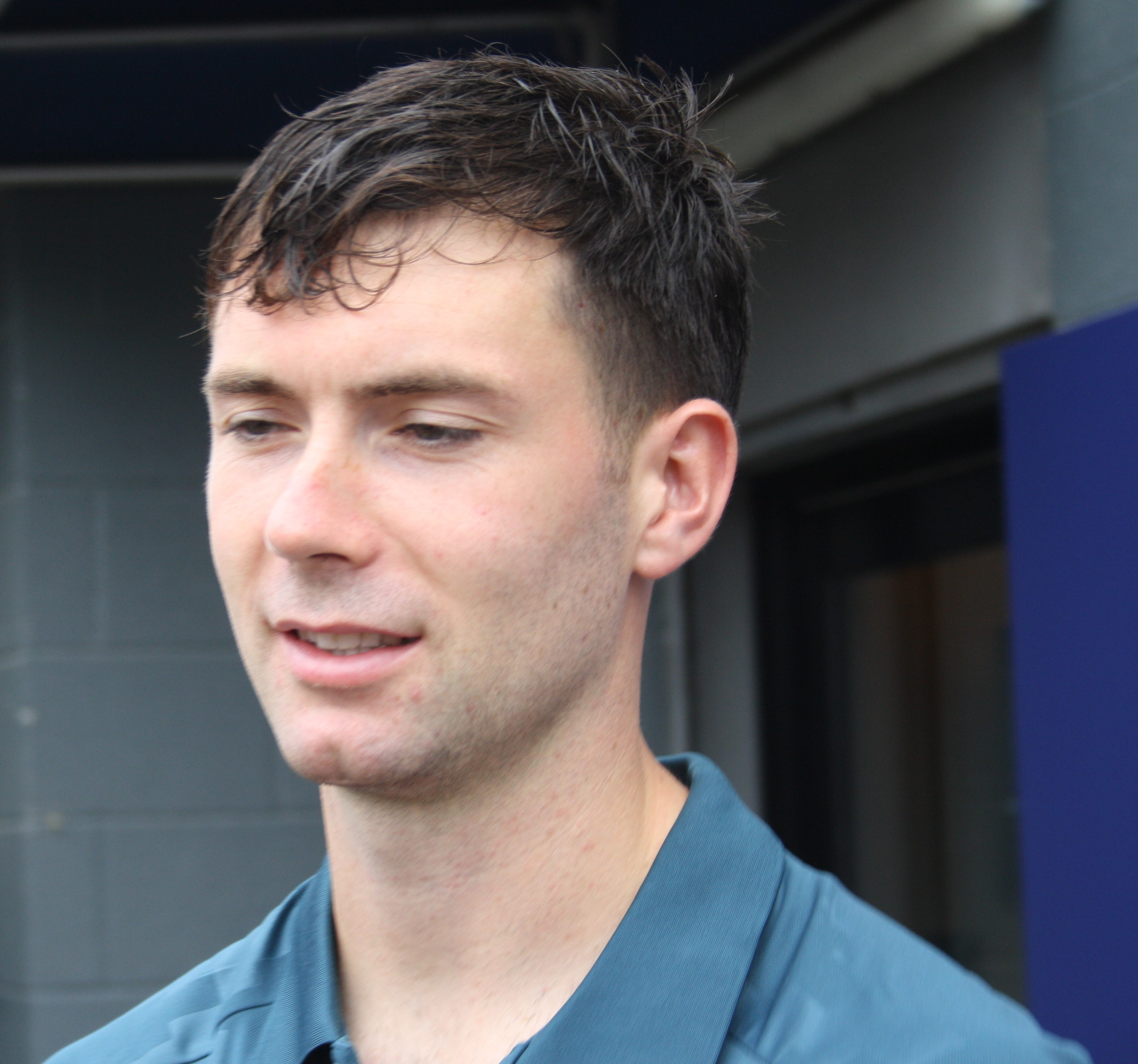
- O'Connor in 2025.

Personal information
- Full name: Thomas James O'Connor
- Date of birth: 21 April 1999 (age 27)
- Place of birth: Kilkenny, Ireland
- Height: 1.86 m (6 ft 1 in)
- Positions: Defender; midfielder

Team information
- Current team: Peterborough United
- Number: 6

Youth career
- 2015–2019: Southampton

Senior career*
| Years | Team | Apps | (Gls) |
| 2019–2021 | Southampton | 0 | (0) |
| 2019–2020 | → Gillingham (loan) | 28 | (1) |
| 2020–2021 | → Gillingham (loan) | 34 | (0) |
| 2021–2022 | Burton Albion | 18 | (5) |
| 2022–2026 | Wrexham | 96 | (4) |
| 2025–2026 | → Peterborough United (loan) | 16 | (0) |
| 2026– | Peterborough United | 5 | (0) |

International career
| 2017–2018 | Republic of Ireland U19 | | |
| 2019–2020 | Republic of Ireland U21 | | |
- * Club domestic league appearances and goals as of 21:38, 17 November 2026 (UTC)

Thomas James O'Connor (born 21 April 1999) is an Irish professional footballer who plays as a defender and midfielder for EFL League One club Peterborough United

== Club career ==
=== Southampton ===
Born in Kilkenny, O'Connor first joined the Southampton academy in 2015. He was contracted to the club until June 2021 having signed a two-year contract extension in January 2019.

On 29 August 2019 O'Connor signed for League One side Gillingham on loan until January 2020. He made his debut for the club two days later in a 5–0 league win over Bolton Wanderers. His first league goal for the club was an 83rd-minute equaliser against Bristol Rovers on 17 September 2019.

On 31 December 2019 his loan with the club was extended until the end of the 2019–20 season. He returned to Southampton at the conclusion of the 2019–20 season, having made 32 appearances for the Kent side in all competitions. On 29 September 2020 he re-signed for Gillingham on loan for the 2020–21 season.

=== Burton Albion ===
On 23 June 2021 it was announced that he would sign a two-year deal for League One side Burton Albion following the expiry of his Southampton contract.

=== Wrexham ===
He moved to Wrexham of the National League for an undisclosed fee in January 2022, making his debut for the Welsh side in a 1–0 away league defeat to Torquay United.

On 9 July 2024, he signed a three-year extension until 2027.

=== Peterborough United ===
On 1 September 2025, O'Connor signed for EFL League One side Peterborough United on loan until the end of the season. The loan was terminated on 2 February 2026 due to injury.

On 30 June 2026, O'Connor re-signed for Peterborough United on a permanent deal for a free transfer on a three-year deal.

== International career ==
O'Connor was called up to the Republic of Ireland U19 squad in February 2017. He made his debut as a substitute in a 1–0 win over Portugal.

He was called up to the Republic of Ireland U21 squad in November 2019, making his debut in a 1–0 win over Armenia in a 2021 UEFA European Under-21 Championship qualifier.

== Personal life ==
In January 2026, O'Connor was fined £4,200 by the Football Association for breaching its betting rules, after placing 16 bets on matches – including those in competitions that his own club was involved in – between April 2017 and May 2021.

== Career statistics ==
As of match played 17 November 2026

Appearances and goals by club, season and competition
| Club | Season | League | | | FA Cup | | League Cup | | Other | | Total | |
| Club | Season | Division | Apps | Goals | Apps | Goals | Apps | Goals | Apps | Goals | Apps | Goals |
|---|---|---|---|---|---|---|---|---|---|---|---|---|
| Southampton U21s | 2016–17 EFL Trophy | | — | | — | | — | | 3 (Note: Appearance(s) in EFL Trophy) | 0 | 3 | 0 |
| Southampton U21s | 2017–18 EFL Trophy | | — | | — | | — | | 0 | 0 | 0 | 0 |
| Southampton U21s | 2018–19 EFL Trophy | | — | | — | | — | | 3 | 0 | 3 | 0 |
| Southampton U21s | 2019–20 EFL Trophy | | — | | — | | — | | 0 | 0 | 0 | 0 |
| Southampton U21s | 2020–21 EFL Trophy | | — | | — | | — | | 1 | 0 | 1 | 0 |
| Southampton U21s | Total | | — | | — | | — | | 7 | 0 | 7 | 0 |
| Southampton | 2019–20 | Premier League | 0 | 0 | 0 | 0 | 0 | 0 | 0 | 0 | 0 | 0 |
| Southampton | 2020–21 | Premier League | 0 | 0 | 0 | 0 | 0 | 0 | 0 | 0 | 0 | 0 |
| Southampton | Total | | 0 | 0 | 0 | 0 | 0 | 0 | 0 | 0 | 0 | 0 |
| Gillingham (loan) | 2019–20 | League One | 28 | 1 | 3 | 0 | 0 | 0 | 1 | 0 | 32 | 1 |
| Gillingham (loan) | 2020–21 | League One | 34 | 0 | 1 | 0 | 0 | 0 | 0 | 0 | 35 | 0 |
| Burton Albion | 2021–22 | League One | 18 | 5 | 1 | 0 | 1 | 0 | 1 | 0 | 21 | 5 |
| Wrexham | 2021–22 | National League | 7 | 0 | 0 | 0 | 0 | 0 | 2 | 0 | 9 | 0 |
| Wrexham | 2022–23 | National League | 24 | 4 | 5 | 2 | 0 | 0 | 1 | 0 | 30 | 4 |
| Wrexham | 2023–24 | League Two | 34 | 0 | 3 | 1 | 1 | 0 | 1 | 0 | 39 | 1 |
| Wrexham | 2024–25 | League One | 31 | 0 | 1 | 0 | 0 | 0 | 3 | 0 | 35 | 0 |
| Wrexham | 2025–26 | Championship | 0 | 0 | 0 | 0 | 0 | 0 | 0 | 0 | 0 | 0 |
| Wrexham | Total | | 96 | 4 | 9 | 3 | 1 | 0 | 7 | 0 | 113 | 5 |
| Peterborough United (loan) | 2025–26 | League One | 16 | 0 | 0 | 0 | 0 | 0 | 2 | 0 | 18 | 0 |
| Peterborough United | 2026–27 | League One | 5 | 0 | 1 | 0 | 1 | 0 | 1 | 0 | 9 | 0 |
| Career total | | | 197 | 10 | 15 | 3 | 3 | 0 | 19 | 0 | 223 | 13 |

== Honours ==
Wrexham

- EFL League Two runner-up: 2023–24
- EFL League One runner-up: 2024–25
- National League: 2022–23
- FA Trophy runner-up: 2021–22
