= Tyreke Johnson =

English association football player (born 1998)

Personal information
- Full name: Tyreke Martin Johnson
- Date of birth: 3 November 1998 (age 28)
- Place of birth: Trowbridge, England
- Height: 5 ft 8 in (1.73 m)
- Position: Midfielder

Youth career
- 2006–2010: Watford
- 2010–2014: Swindon Town
- 2014–2016: Southampton

Senior career*
Years	Team	Apps	(Gls)
2018–2021	Southampton	1	(0)
2019	→ Woking (loan)	12	(2)
2020	→ Hartford Athletic (loan)	15	(2)
2021	→ Gillingham (loan)	1	(0)
2021	Gillingham	6	(0)
2021–2023	Woking	45	(3)
2022	→ Dagenham & Redbridge (loan)	4	(0)
2023	→ Chelmsford City (loan)	13	(2)
2023–2025	Chippenham Town	75	(5)
2025	Eastern Lions		
- * Club domestic league appearances and goals as of 19:34, 19 March 2025 (UTC)

Tyreke Martin Johnson (born 3 November 1998) is an English professional footballer who plays as a midfielder.

== Career ==
On 3 November 2015, Johnson signed his first professional contract with Southampton. Johnson made his professional debut with Southampton as a late substitute in a 3–2 Premier League win over Arsenal on 16 December 2018.

On 2 August 2019, Johnson joined Woking on loan in the National League for six months. He scored his first goal for the club in a league game against Barrow. Unfortunately his time at the club was cut short after dislocating his shoulder in a match against Chorley.

On 24 February 2020, Johnson moved on a season-long loan to USL Championship side Hartford Athletic. He made his debut in Hartford's opening match against New York Red Bulls II on 17 July, and scored his first goal for the club in a 3–1 victory over Loudoun United on 20 July.

Johnson signed for League One side Gillingham on loan on 8 January 2021, for the remainder of the season. Twelve days later the move was made permanent. On 14 May 2021, it was announced that Johnson would leave the Gills at the end of his contract in June.

On 24 May 2021, Johnson agreed a deal to return to National League side Woking ahead of the 2021–22 campaign. He made his return in a Woking shirt, replacing Tahvon Campbell in the 75th minute during their 3–2 home defeat to FC Halifax Town on 28 August 2021. On 21 October 2022, Johnson signed for fellow National League side Dagenham & Redbridge on a one-month loan deal. On 24 February 2023, Johnson signed for Chelmsford City on loan until the end of the season. On 15 May 2023, it was announced that Johnson would leave the club following the conclusion of his contract.

On 23 May 2023, Johnson agreed to join National League South side, Chippenham Town. In June 2025, it was announced he was leaving the club to sign for a team in Australia. He later scored on his debut for Victorian Premier League side Eastern Lions.

== Career statistics ==
As of match played 15 March 2025

Appearances and goals by club, season and competition
Club	Season	League			National Cup (Note: Includes FA Cup)		League Cup (Note: Includes EFL Cup)		Other		Total	
Club	Season	Division	Apps	Goals	Apps	Goals	Apps	Goals	Apps	Goals	Apps	Goals
Southampton U21/U23	2016–17	—			—		—		4 (Note: Appearances in the EFL Trophy)	0	4	0
Southampton U21/U23	2017–18	—			—		—		3	1	3	1
Southampton U21/U23	2018–19	—			—		—		3	0	3	0
Southampton U21/U23	2020–21	—			—		—		1	0	1	0
Southampton U21/U23	Total		—		—		—		11	1	11	1
Southampton	2018–19	Premier League	1	0	2	0	0	0	—		3	0
Southampton	2019–20	Premier League	0	0	0	0	0	0	—		0	0
Southampton	2020–21	Premier League	0	0	0	0	0	0	—		0	0
Southampton	Total		1	0	2	0	0	0	—		3	0
Woking (loan)	2019–20	National League	12	2	0	0	—		0	0	12	2
Hartford Athletic (loan)	2020	USL Championship	15	2	0	0	—		—		15	2
Gillingham (loan)	2020–21	League One	1	0	—		—		—		1	0
Gillingham	2020–21	League One	6	0	—		—		—		6	0
Woking	2021–22	National League	36	1	1	0	—		1 (Note: Appearance in the FA Trophy)	0	38	1
Woking	2022–23	National League	9	2	0	0	—		1	0	10	2
Woking	Total		45	3	1	0	—		2	0	48	3
Dagenham & Redbridge (loan)	2022–23	National League	4	0	—		—		—		4	0
Chelmsford City (loan)	2022–23	National League South	13	2	—		—		1 (Note: Appearance in the National League South play-offs)	0	14	2
Chippenham Town	2023–24	National League South	34	4	1	0	—		1	0	36	4
Chippenham Town	2024–25	National League South	34	1	2	1	—		1	0	37	2
Chippenham Town	Total		68	5	3	1	—		2	0	73	6
Career total			165	14	6	1	0	0	16	1	187	16
