= Connor Ogilvie =

English footballer (born 1996)

Personal information
- Full name: Connor Stuart Ogilvie
- Date of birth: 14 February 1996 (age 30)
- Place of birth: Waltham Abbey, England
- Height: 1.84 m (6 ft 0 in)
- Positions: Left back; centre back

Team information
- Current team: Portsmouth
- Number: 3

Youth career
- 2012–2014: Tottenham Hotspur

Senior career*
| Years | Team | Apps | (Gls) |
| 2014–2019 | Tottenham Hotspur | 0 | (0) |
| 2015–2016 | → Stevenage (loan) | 21 | (1) |
| 2017 | → Stevenage (loan) | 18 | (0) |
| 2017–2018 | → Gillingham (loan) | 37 | (1) |
| 2018–2019 | → Gillingham (loan) | 31 | (0) |
| 2019–2021 | Gillingham | 78 | (8) |
| 2021– | Portsmouth | 176 | (13) |

International career^{‡}
| 2011–2012 | England U16 | 2 | (0) |
| 2012–2013 | England U17 | 13 | (1) |
- * Club domestic league appearances and goals as of 22:45, 21 April 2026 (UTC) ‡ National team caps and goals as of 25 June 2016

Connor Stuart Ogilvie (born 14 February 1996) is an English professional footballer who plays as a left back or centre back for EFL Championship club Portsmouth.

== Club career ==
=== Tottenham Hotspur ===
Ogilvie started his career in Tottenham Hotspur's academy since July 2012. After progressing throughout the ranks of the academy and the development squad, Ogilvie was included in the squad for the first team in the UEFA Europa League match as unused substitute in a 2–2 draw against Benfica on 20 March 2014.

Whilst on loan, Ogilvie signed a two-year contract with the club, keeping him until 2017. Then ahead of the 2017–18 season, Ogilvie signed a two-year contract with the club.

==== Loan spells ====
On 14 August 2015, Ogilvie joined League Two club Stevenage on a one-month loan. He made his debut in a 2–0 win against Hartlepool United on 22 August 2015, and scored his first professional goal in a 2–1 win against Plymouth Argyle on 5 September 2015, then assisted a goal against York City in a 2–2 draw in his next match. His loan was extended until January after his impressive performances. On 14 November, his free kick assisted a late equaliser against Yeovil Town. Later, his loan was extended every month until the end of the season. Despite being sidelined out of the first team on four occasions.

On 24 January 2017, Ogilvie was loaned back to Stevenage until the end of the season. Ogilvie's first appearance back at Stevenage in his second loan spell came on 28 January 2017, in a 2–0 win over Grimsby Town. Since re-joining Stevenage, Ogilvie re-established himself in the first team, making 18 appearances for the side.

On 7 July 2017, Ogilvie signed a new two-year contract and was loaned to League One club Gillingham until January 2018. He made his Gillingham debut in the opening game of the season, in a 0–0 draw against Doncaster Rovers. Initially playing in the left-midfield position, he played in the left-back position. Gillingham re-signed Ogilvie on loan for the first half of 2018–19 season, later extending this until the end of the season.

=== Gillingham ===
After two loan spells at the club Ogilvie joined Gillingham on a permanent deal in May 2019 signing a two-year contract. He was named as the Kent side's Player of the Season at the conclusion of the 2019–20 season. Ogilvie rejected the offer of a new contract by the club at the end of the 2020–21 season.

=== Portsmouth ===
On 2 August 2021, Ogilvie joined Gillingham's League One rivals Portsmouth on a free transfer, signing a two-year contract with the potential for a third. He scored his first goal for the club on 11 December 2021 in a 2–0 win against Morecambe.

== International career ==
Ogilvie represented England, both for England U16 and England U17.

== Career statistics ==
As of match played 21 April 2026

Appearances and goals by club, season and competition
| Club | Season | League | | | FA Cup | | League Cup | | Other | | Total | |
| Club | Season | Division | Apps | Goals | Apps | Goals | Apps | Goals | Apps | Goals | Apps | Goals |
|---|---|---|---|---|---|---|---|---|---|---|---|---|
| Stevenage (loan) | 2015–16 | League Two | 21 | 1 | 2 | 0 | 0 | 0 | 1 (Note: Appearances in Football League Trophy) | 0 | 24 | 1 |
| Stevenage (loan) | 2016–17 | League Two | 18 | 0 | 0 | 0 | 0 | 0 | 0 | 0 | 18 | 0 |
| Stevenage (loan) | Total | | 39 | 1 | 2 | 0 | 0 | 0 | 1 | 0 | 42 | 1 |
| Gillingham (loan) | 2017–18 | League One | 37 | 1 | 2 | 0 | 1 | 0 | 2 (Note: Appearances in EFL Trophy) | 0 | 42 | 1 |
| Gillingham (loan) | 2018–19 | League One | 31 | 0 | 4 | 0 | 0 | 0 | 2 | 0 | 37 | 0 |
| Gillingham | 2019–20 | League One | 33 | 4 | 4 | 0 | 1 | 0 | 3 | 0 | 41 | 4 |
| Gillingham | 2020–21 | League One | 45 | 4 | 2 | 0 | 3 | 1 | 1 | 0 | 51 | 5 |
| Gillingham | Total | | 146 | 9 | 12 | 0 | 5 | 1 | 8 | 0 | 171 | 10 |
| Portsmouth | 2021–22 | League One | 34 | 1 | 2 | 0 | 1 | 0 | 4 | 0 | 41 | 1 |
| Portsmouth | 2022–23 | League One | 43 | 5 | 3 | 0 | 1 | 0 | 4 | 0 | 51 | 5 |
| Portsmouth | 2023–24 | League One | 24 | 2 | 0 | 0 | 1 | 0 | 0 | 0 | 25 | 2 |
| Portsmouth | 2024–25 | Championship | 45 | 4 | 0 | 0 | 1 | 0 | 0 | 0 | 46 | 6 |
| Portsmouth | 2025–26 | Championship | 30 | 1 | 1 | 0 | 0 | 0 | 0 | 0 | 31 | 1 |
| Portsmouth | Total | | 176 | 13 | 6 | 0 | 4 | 0 | 8 | 0 | 194 | 13 |
| Career total | | | 361 | 23 | 20 | 0 | 9 | 1 | 17 | 0 | 407 | 24 |

== Honours ==
Portsmouth

- EFL League One: 2023–24

Individual

- Gillingham Player of the Season: 2019–20
