= Jordan Graham =

English footballer (born 1995)

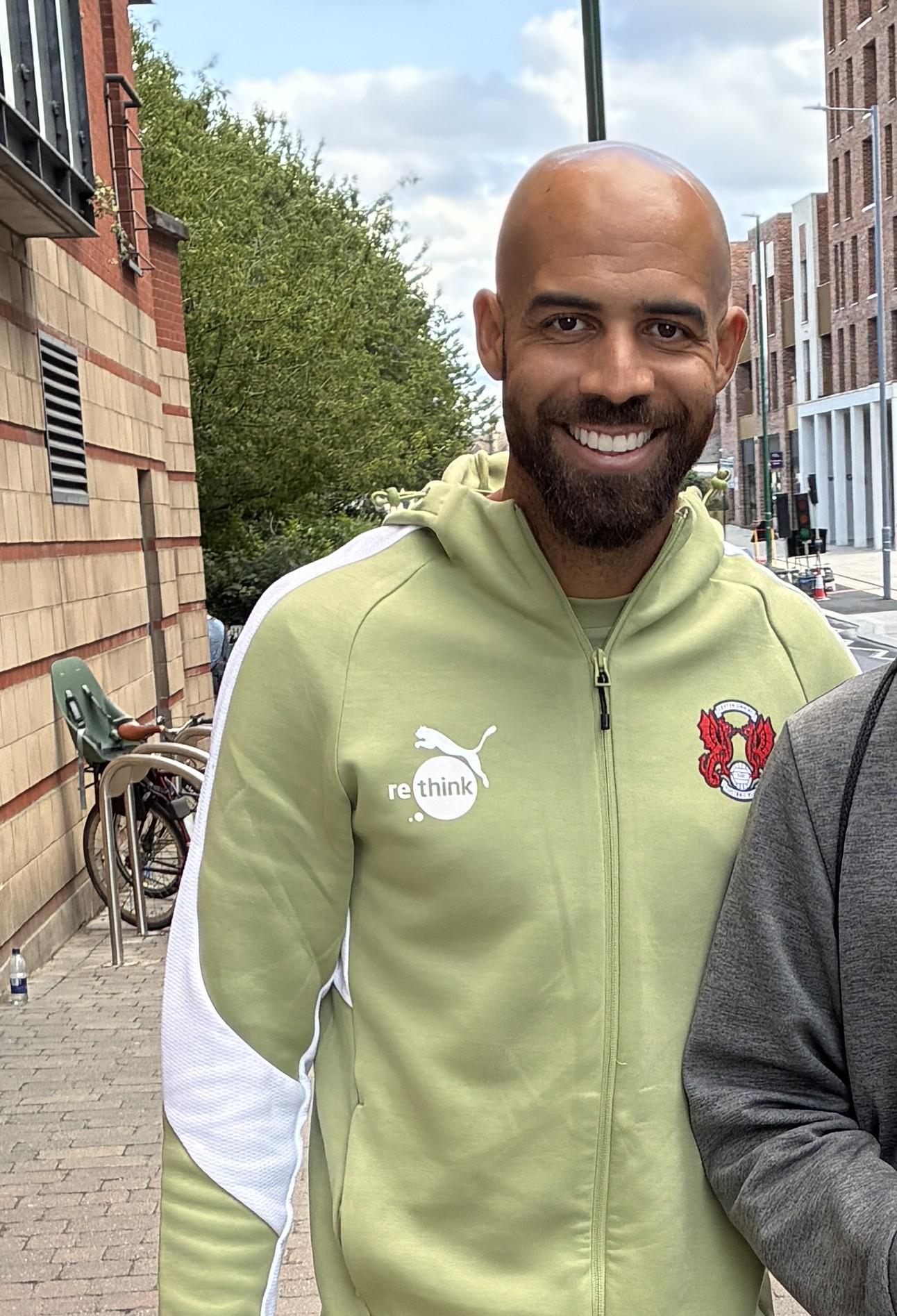
- Graham with Leyton Orient in 2025

Personal information
- Full name: Jordan Tyler Graham
- Date of birth: 5 March 1995 (age 31)
- Place of birth: Coventry, England
- Height: 6 ft 0 in (1.82 m)
- Position: Right winger

Youth career
- 2002–2013: Aston Villa

Senior career*
Years	Team	Apps	(Gls)
2013–2015	Aston Villa	0	(0)
2013	→ Ipswich Town (loan)	2	(0)
2014	→ Bradford City (loan)	1	(0)
2014–2015	→ Wolverhampton Wanderers (loan)	0	(0)
2015–2020	Wolverhampton Wanderers	14	(1)
2015	→ Oxford United (loan)	5	(0)
2017–2018	→ Fulham (loan)	3	(0)
2018–2019	→ Ipswich Town (loan)	4	(0)
2019	→ Oxford United (loan)	16	(1)
2020	→ Gillingham (loan)	7	(0)
2020–2021	Gillingham	39	(12)
2021–2023	Birmingham City	49	(0)
2023–2025	Leyton Orient	24	(0)

International career
2010	Republic of Ireland U15	2	(2)
2010–2011	England U16	5	(0)
2011–2012	England U17	11	(0)
- * Club domestic league appearances and goals as of 22:49, 26 November 2024 (UTC)

Jordan Tyler Graham (born 5 March 1995) is a professional footballer who plays on the right wing. He represented both England and the Republic of Ireland at youth international level.

A product of Aston Villa's academy, where he spent 12 years without making a first-team appearance, he instead spent time on loan at Ipswich Town, Bradford City, and Wolverhampton Wanderers (Wolves). He was sold to Wolves in January 2015, where he would spend the next five years. He spent time on loan at Oxford United (across two spells), Fulham, Ipswich Town, and Gillingham. He signed for Gillingham permanently in August 2020. He joined Birmingham City for a two-year spell in June 2021, then moved on to Leyton Orient in August 2023, where he spent another two years before leaving the club in July 2025.

== Club career ==
=== Aston Villa ===
Graham is a product of Aston Villa's youth academy, joining at the age of eight. He signed a two-year professional contract with Aston Villa in March 2012. He was a member of their NextGen Series-winning side in the 2012–13 season. However, he later said that manager Paul Lambert was not interested in youth products.

On 28 November 2013, Graham joined Championship club Ipswich Town on a youth loan until 4 January. Manager Mick McCarthy gave him his senior debut on 7 December in a 2–1 win over Huddersfield Town at Portman Road. He also made a brief appearance in the victory over Doncaster Rovers before returning to Villa Park at the end of December.

On 10 January 2014, he signed for League One club Bradford City on a one-month loan. He was used as backup cover on the bench at Valley Parade by manager Phil Parkinson. He played only once, against his future club Wolverhampton Wanderers on 1 February.

=== Wolverhampton Wanderers ===
Graham joined Wolverhampton Wanderers, now returned to the Championship, in November 2014 on loan until the January transfer window. Injury prevented him from making any first-team appearances during this loan period, but on 5 January 2015 he signed a permanent 18-month deal with the club for an undisclosed fee. After failing to make a first-team appearance for Wolves, he joined Oxford United of League Two on 28 September 2015. Following a successful initial month, his loan was extended by two months, but a few days later he was recalled because of an injury crisis at his parent club. Oxford defender George Baldock praised him for his performances, whilst manager Michael Appleton was disappointed to lose him, comparing him with Kemar Roofe.

Graham made his Wolves debut on 21 November in the starting eleven for the visit to Ipswich Town, and scored his first senior goal on 28 December 2015 in the 52nd minute of a Championship game against Charlton Athletic at The Valley, which Wolves won 2–0. Manager Kenny Jackett said that the loan spell at Oxford had improved him, allowing him the chance to replace the departed Bakary Sako on the left wing. However, he suffered torn knee ligaments during a game against Cardiff City on 16 January 2016. Despite this, Graham extended his contract with Wolves until the end of the 2017–18 season, with the club having the option of two additional years. He was initially expected to be out of action for between nine and twelve months, but after suffering several setbacks during his recovery, he did not return to first-team football until 15 months later, on 25 April 2017, in a 1–0 defeat against Huddersfield at Molineux. He and Kortney Hause were disciplined by new manager Paul Lambert for a breach of club discipline in January 2017. He reconciled with Lambert, but then left the first-team picture under his replacement Nuno Espírito Santo. Espírito Santo wanted him to play as a wing-back, which Gordon was reluctant to do.

On 31 August 2017, he joined Championship rivals Fulham on loan until the end of the season. However, he was one of a number of players at Craven Cottage not favoured by manager Slaviša Jokanović. He returned to his parent club in mid-January 2018 having made just three substitute appearances.

On 28 August 2018, Graham returned to Ipswich Town on a season-long loan, who were bottom of the Championship. After Paul Lambert replaced Paul Hurst as Ipswich manager, Graham began training with Oxford United, with a view to return to the Kassam Stadium on loan in January, which was confirmed in December 2018. Manager Karl Robinson had initially tried to sign him in the summer. He scored his first Oxford goal, and the second League goal of his career, with a well-taken free kick in a surprise away victory over Blackpool on 23 February 2019.

A loan was agreed for Graham and Wolves team-mate Sylvain Deslandes at Bulgarian club Lokomotiv Plovdiv for the 2019–20 season, but it fell through due to an issue with FIFA clearance. Graham made an appearance for Wolves U21 in the EFL Trophy game against Blackpool, which ended in a 1–0 defeat.

=== Gillingham ===
On 31 January 2020, Graham signed for League One club Gillingham on a six-month loan. Manager Steve Evans said he had an "outstanding" debut, but needed to work harder. He made seven league appearances before the league was suspended and subsequently ended early because of the COVID-19 pandemic. He returned to Wolves, who confirmed on 18 May 2020 that he had left the club. He signed for Gillingham permanently on 12 August 2020. He enjoyed the best season of his career in 2020–21, scoring 13 goals and providing nine assists in 44 games in all competitions, choosing to leave Priestfield for a higher division when his contract ended. Charlton Athletic and other clubs had tried to sign him in the January transfer window, but were rebuffed.

=== Birmingham City ===
On 24 June 2021, Graham signed a two-year contract with a one-year option with Championship club Birmingham City, to begin on 1 July when his Gillingham contract expired. He made his debut in the starting eleven for Birmingham's 1–0 win against Colchester United in the EFL Cup first round. Manager Lee Bowyer initially had him playing for the under-23 team, before calling him up to the first-team to play out of position at wing-back following an injury crisis. He spent much of the 2021–22 season playing in a makeshift defence, and spent some time sidelined with a hamstring injury. He continued to play at wing-back in the 2022–23 season after John Eustace replaced Lee Bowyer as manager. During two seasons with the club, Graham made 54 appearances in all competitions. His option was not taken up, and he was one of six senior professionals released from St Andrew's in June 2023.

=== Leyton Orient ===
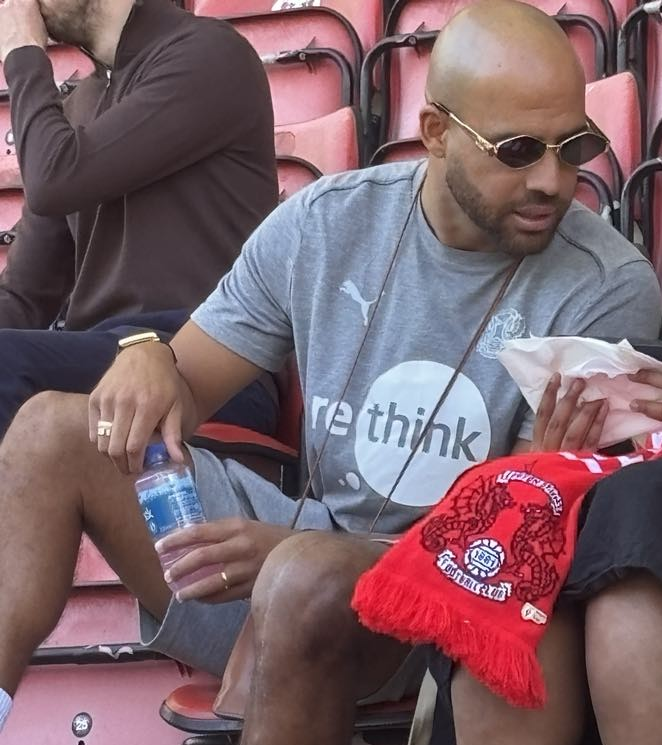
Graham with Leyton Orient in 2025.

On 2 August 2023, Graham signed for League One club Leyton Orient on a two-year deal. He enjoyed playing as a winger again at Brisbane Road, though was ruled out until the end of the 2023–24 season after suffering an ACL injury in October. Manager Richie Wellens said that he struggled with hamstring injuries after regaining stability in the knee. He suffered another serious knee injury in November 2024, rupturing his patella tendon, bringing his 2024–25 season to a premature end. He left the club upon the expiry of his contract in June 2025.

== International career ==
Graham represented England at under-16 and under-17 levels. He was a member of the England U16 squad that retained the 2010–11 Victory Shield. He also represented England U17, playing in and winning the 2012 Algarve Tournament. Graham also played for the Republic of Ireland at under-15 level in the 2010 Tri-Nations tournament, scoring twice against Northern Ireland U15s.

== Style of play ==
Graham is a winger who was highly rated in his youth due to his pace, trickery, long-distance shooting and crossing. His career was disrupted by a serious knee injury, after which he said he spent four years where football 'just felt like a job', before his career prospects improved in 2020.

== Personal life ==
It was announced on 21 September 2026 that Graham was hospitalised and receiving "specialist care" after a road traffic incident earlier that month.

== Career statistics ==
As of match played 26 November 2024

Appearances and goals by club, season and competition
Club	Season	League			FA Cup		EFL Cup		Other		Total	
Club	Season	Division	Apps	Goals	Apps	Goals	Apps	Goals	Apps	Goals	Apps	Goals
Aston Villa	2013–14	Premier League	0	0	0	0	0	0	—		0	0
Aston Villa	2014–15	Premier League	0	0	0	0	0	0	—		0	0
Aston Villa	Total		0	0	0	0	0	0	0	0	0	0
Ipswich Town (loan)	2013–14	Championship	2	0	0	0	0	0	—		2	0
Bradford City (loan)	2013–14	League One	1	0	—		—		—		1	0
Wolverhampton Wanderers	2014–15	Championship	0	0	0	0	—		—		0	0
Wolverhampton Wanderers	2015–16	Championship	11	1	1	0	0	0	—		12	1
Wolverhampton Wanderers	2016–17	Championship	2	0	0	0	0	0	—		2	0
Wolverhampton Wanderers	2017–18	Championship	1	0	0	0	2	0	—		3	0
Wolverhampton Wanderers	Total		14	1	1	0	2	0	0	0	17	1
Oxford United (loan)	2015–16	League Two	5	0	0	0	—		1 (Note: Appearance(s) in EFL Trophy)	0	6	0
Fulham (loan)	2017–18	Championship	3	0	0	0	—		0	0	3	0
Fulham U21 (loan)	2017–18	—			—		—		1	2	1	2
Ipswich Town (loan)	2018–19	Championship	4	0	0	0	—		—		4	0
Oxford United (loan)	2018–19	League One	16	1	1	0	—		2	0	19	1
Wolverhampton Wanderers U21	2019–20	—			—		—		2	0	2	0
Gillingham (loan)	2019–20	League One	7	0	—		—		—		7	0
Gillingham	2020–21	League One	39	12	2	0	2	1	1	0	44	13
Gillingham	Total		46	12	2	0	2	1	1	0	51	13
Birmingham City	2021–22	Championship	24	0	0	0	2	0	—		26	0
Birmingham City	2022–23	Championship	25	0	2	0	1	0	—		28	0
Birmingham City	Total		49	0	2	0	3	0	0	0	54	0
Leyton Orient	2023–24	League One	16	0	0	0	1	0	1	0	18	0
Leyton Orient	2024–25	League One	8	0	0	0	0	0	2	0	10	0
Leyton Orient	Total		24	0	0	0	1	0	3	0	28	0
Career total			164	14	6	0	8	1	10	2	188	17

== Honours ==
Aston Villa U19

- NextGen Series: 2012–13
