= Olly Lee =

English footballer (born 1991)

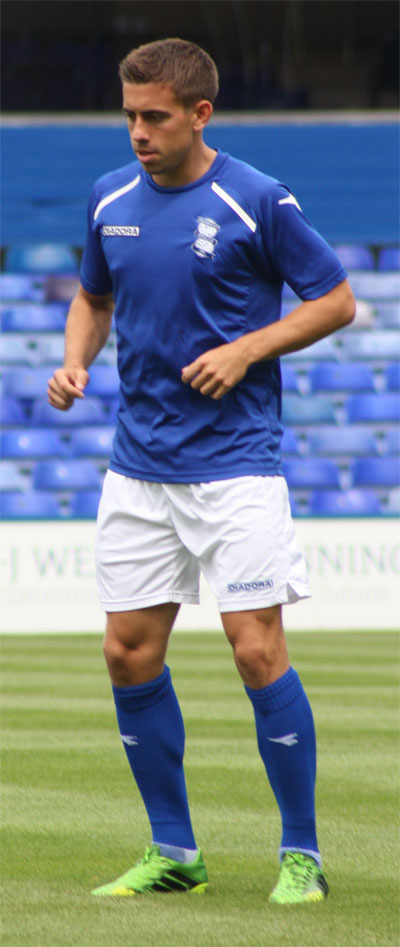
- Lee with Birmingham City in 2013 pre-season

Personal information
- Full name: Oliver Robert Lee
- Date of birth: 11 July 1991 (age 35)
- Place of birth: Hornchurch, England
- Height: 5 ft 11 in (1.81 m)
- Position: Midfielder

Team information
- Current team: Norwich City (Under 21's Coach)

Youth career
- –2009: West Ham United

Senior career*
Years	Team	Apps	(Gls)
2009–2012	West Ham United	0	(0)
2011	→ Dagenham & Redbridge (loan)	5	(0)
2011	→ Dagenham & Redbridge (loan)	16	(3)
2012	→ Gillingham (loan)	8	(0)
2012–2013	Barnet	11	(0)
2013	→ Birmingham City (loan)	0	(0)
2013–2015	Birmingham City	16	(1)
2015	→ Plymouth Argyle (loan)	15	(2)
2015–2018	Luton Town	105	(10)
2018–2021	Heart of Midlothian	41	(4)
2019–2020	→ Gillingham (loan)	28	(4)
2021	→ Gillingham (loan)	25	(5)
2021–2023	Gillingham	38	(1)
Total		307	(30)
- * Club domestic league appearances and goals

Oliver Robert Lee (born 11 July 1991) is an English former professional footballer and coach who played as a midfielder. He is Under 21's Coach at Norwich City.

Lee started his career as a youth player with West Ham United, with whom he turned professional in 2009. He made his debut in the Football League during the first of two loan spells at Dagenham & Redbridge in 2011, and also played on loan to League Two club Gillingham in 2012. He never made a senior appearance for West Ham, and moved on to Barnet in July 2012. After nine months and thirteen appearances, he signed for Championship club Birmingham City on loan. Despite not having played first-team football for Birmingham, the loan was converted to a permanent transfer in May 2013. He played 20 matches in 2013–14 but none the following season, and after a spell on loan at League Two Plymouth Argyle in 2015, he was released. In August 2015, Lee signed for League Two club Luton Town on a short-term contract, which was later extended until the end of 2016–17.

== Playing career ==
=== West Ham United ===
Lee began his football career as a youth team player with West Ham United, for whom he signed professionally in 2009.

==== Dagenham & Redbridge (first loan) ====
He captained the under-18 team, played reserve team football, and was an unused substitute for a League Cup match with West Ham before signing on loan for League One club Dagenham & Redbridge in March 2011. He made his debut in their 2–1 away defeat to Exeter City on 2 April. His loan was extended until the end of the season, during which time he played in five league matches, all defeats, as the club failed to avoid relegation to League Two.

==== Dagenham & Redbridge (second loan) ====
In August 2011, Lee returned to Dagenham on a one-month loan to cover for injuries. The loan was later extended for a further two months. He made sixteen appearances in League Two and one in the Football League Trophy, and scored three goals, all in the league. His first senior goal, in the 73rd minute of a 2–1 defeat at home to Morecambe on 17 September, was a 25-yard (23 m) free kick into the top corner of the net, which manager John Still described as "a bit of a fluke".

==== Gillingham (first loan) ====
After a two-week trial in February 2012, Lee joined League Two club Gillingham on loan for a month. He made his debut on 21 February in a goalless draw at home to Rotherham United, and played eight matches in all during his loan spell, which was extended for a second month.

West Ham released Lee when his contract expired at the end of 2011–12.

=== Barnet ===
Mark Robson signed Lee for League Two club Barnet on 3 July 2012. He played regularly at the start of the season, but increasingly infrequently after the arrival of Edgar Davids as joint head coach, and not at all after Robson left the club.

==== Birmingham City (loan) ====
Lee joined up with Championship club Birmingham City on trial in February 2013, and signed on loan on 21 March. He made no first-team appearances during his loan spell, but he was an unused substitute on the final day of the season, and captained the under-21 development team.

=== Birmingham City ===
Lee signed a permanent one-year contract with Birmingham City in May 2013, with the option of a further year, and no transfer fee was involved.

He took part in pre-season friendlies with the first team, scoring against Alfreton Town, and made his competitive debut as a late substitute in the League Cup on 6 August, just seconds before Plymouth Argyle's equaliser took the match into extra time. With Tom Adeyemi unavailable and Callum Reilly unfit to start, both because of illness, Lee made his first appearance in the Championship at Leeds United on 20 October and played the full 90 minutes as Birmingham lost 4–0. He and Peter Løvenkrands entered the League Cup fourth-round match against Stoke City as 79th-minute substitutes with Birmingham 3–1 down. Lee's 85th-minute free kick led to Løvenkrands pulling a goal back, and after the same player's equaliser took the match into extra time, Lee himself scored his first competitive goal for Birmingham, from outside the penalty area in the 118th minute to make the score 4–4, and converted his penalty in the shootout, which Birmingham lost. He scored his first league goal for Birmingham, with a volleyed finish after Nikola Žigić headed the ball down, on 15 February 2014 in a 2–1 defeat at home to Huddersfield Town, and finished the season with 20 appearances, of which 16 were in Championship matches.

==== Plymouth Argyle (loan) ====
Having failed to set foot on the field for the first team in 2014–15, Lee joined League Two club Plymouth Argyle in January 2015 on a month's loan. He went straight into the starting eleven, and came close to scoring an equaliser from a free kick as Plymouth lost 1–0 at home to Luton Town. He played seven matches during the month, scored once, a stoppage-time header with Argyle already 3–1 down at Hartlepool United, and was sent off in the last of the seven for a foul on Exeter City's Tom Nichols. Despite the consequent three-match suspension, Lee's loan was extended to the end of the season. He made a further eight appearances for Argyle, but was forced to miss the end of the regular season, when Argyle qualified for the play-offs, because of a groin injury.

Birmingham confirmed he would be released when his contract expired at the end of the season.

=== Luton Town ===
Lee signed for League Two club Luton Town on a short-term contract on 21 August 2015 which included performance-based options to lengthen his stay. He signed an extended contract until June 2017 on 22 September 2015. Lee helped Luton win promotion to League One in 2017–18. On 18 November 2017 he scored a goal from his own half during a 7–0 victory over Cambridge United; the 65-yard strike was voted the Mitre Goal of the Season at the 2018 EFL Awards.

=== Heart of Midlothian ===
Lee signed a pre-contract agreement with Scottish Premiership club Heart of Midlothian in May 2018, and joined the club on a three-year contract upon the expiry of his contract with Luton. He scored in the 11th minute of his debut in a 2–1 away victory over Cove Rangers in the Scottish League Cup on 18 July 2018.

==== Gillingham (second loan) ====
On 29 August 2019, Lee rejoined Gillingham, now in League One, on loan until 27 January 2020. The loan was extended until the end of the season on 9 January 2020.

Lee returned to Hearts on 3 May 2020, and played regularly for them during the first part of the 2020–21 season. Lee scored in the penalty shoot-out as Hearts were defeated by Celtic in the 2020 Scottish Cup Final.

==== Gillingham (third loan) ====
Lee rejoined Gillingham for a third loan spell in January 2021.

Lee was in the Hearts team which won the Scottish Championship in the 2020–21 season.

=== Gillingham ===
In June 2021, Lee signed a permanent contract with Gillingham.

He retired from professional football in February 2023 due to struggles with psoriatic arthritis and Raynaud syndrome.

== Coaching career ==
Lee was appointed Under 21's Coach at Norwich City after a short spell as U-18's coach at Ipswich Town.

== Personal life ==
Lee was born in Hornchurch, London, the son of former Newcastle and England midfielder Rob Lee. His younger brother, Elliot, also became a professional footballer. Lee attended Brentwood School in Brentwood, Essex, and played for the Independent Schools Football Association (ISFA) under-16 representative team.

== Career statistics ==
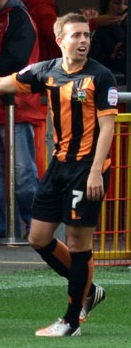
Lee playing for Barnet in 2012

As of 22 February 2023

Appearances and goals by club, season and competition
Club	Season	League			National Cup (Note: Includes FA Cup, Scottish Cup)		League Cup (Note: Includes Football League Cup, EFL Cup, Scottish League Cup)		Other		Total	
Club	Season	Division	Apps	Goals	Apps	Goals	Apps	Goals	Apps	Goals	Apps	Goals
West Ham United	2009–10	Premier League	0	0	0	0	0	0	—		0	0
West Ham United	2010–11	Premier League	0	0	0	0	0	0	—		0	0
West Ham United	2011–12	Championship	0	0	0	0	0	0	0	0	0	0
West Ham United	Total		0	0	0	0	0	0	0	0	0	0
Dagenham & Redbridge (loan)	2010–11	League One	5	0	—		—		—		5	0
Dagenham & Redbridge (loan)	2011–12	League Two	15	3	—		0	0	1 (Note: Appearance(s) in Football League Trophy)	0	16	3
Dagenham & Redbridge (loan)	Total		20	3	—		0	0	1	0	21	3
Gillingham (loan)	2011–12	League Two	8	0	—		—		—		8	0
Barnet	2012–13	League Two	11	0	1	0	1	0	0	0	13	0
Birmingham City (loan)	2012–13	Championship	0	0	—		—		—		0	0
Birmingham City	2013–14	Championship	16	1	2	0	2	1	—		20	2
Birmingham City	2014–15	Championship	0	0	0	0	0	0	—		0	0
Birmingham City	Total		16	1	2	0	2	1	—		20	2
Plymouth Argyle (loan)	2014–15	League Two	15	2	—		—		—		15	2
Luton Town	2015–16	League Two	34	3	2	0	1	0	2	0	39	3
Luton Town	2016–17	League Two	33	1	2	0	2	0	4 (Note: Two appearances in EFL Trophy, two in League Two play-offs)	0	41	1
Luton Town	2017–18	League Two	38	6	3	1	1	0	1 (Note: Appearance(s) in EFL Trophy)	0	43	7
Luton Town	Total		105	10	7	1	4	0	7	0	123	11
Heart of Midlothian	2018–19	Scottish Premiership	31	3	4	0	6	3	—		41	6
Heart of Midlothian	2019–20	Scottish Premiership	0	0	2 (Note: Later rounds of the 2019–20 Scottish Cup were delayed until the 2020–21 season as a result of the COVID-19 pandemic in Scotland)	0	0	0	—		2	0
Heart of Midlothian	2020–21	Scottish Championship	10	1	0	0	5	2	—		15	3
Heart of Midlothian	Total		41	4	6	0	11	5	—		58	9
Gillingham (loan)	2019–20	League One	28	4	4	2	—		2	0	34	6
Gillingham (loan)	2020–21	League One	25	5	0	0	—		0	0	25	5
Gillingham	2021–22	League One	32	1	0	0	2	0	2	0	36	1
Gillingham	2022–23	League Two	6	0	0	0	3	0	1	0	10	0
Gillingham	Total		91	10	4	2	5	0	5	0	105	12
Career total			307	30	20	3	23	6	13	0	363	39

== Honours ==
Heart of Midlothian

- Scottish Cup: runner-up: 2018–19, 2019–20
- Scottish Championship: 2020–21

Luton Town

- EFL League Two runner-up: 2017–18
