= Jack Tucker =

English footballer (born 1999)

Personal information
- Full name: Jack Robert Tucker
- Date of birth: 13 November 1999 (age 27)
- Place of birth: Whitstable, Kent, England
- Position: Defender

Team information
- Current team: Colchester United
- Number: 5

Youth career
- –2007: Whitstable Town
- 2007–2018: Gillingham

Senior career*
Years	Team	Apps	(Gls)
2017–2022	Gillingham	116	(3)
2018	→ Greenwich Borough (loan)	2	(1)
2018–2019	→ Hastings United (loan)	7	(0)
2022–2025	Milton Keynes Dons	63	(1)
2025	→ Colchester United (loan)	10	(0)
2025–	Colchester United	61	(2)
- * Club domestic league appearances and goals as of 14:29, 22 November 2026 (UTC)

Jack Robert Tucker (born 13 November 1999) is an English professional footballer who plays as a defender for Colchester United.

== Club career ==
=== Gillingham ===
Tucker joined the academy of Gillingham as a seven-year old from his hometown club Whitstable Town.

Having progressed through the academy system, he made his league debut for the club on 8 October 2017 as a 45th-minute substitute in a 1–0 defeat to Portsmouth, and soon after signed professional terms in January 2018. During his first two seasons as a professional, Tucker had short loan spells with Isthmian League clubs Greenwich Borough and Hastings United, and featured twice in the EFL Trophy for Gillingham. Following impressive performances, he was rewarded with a contract extension at the end of the 2018–19 season.

On 12 November 2019, Tucker scored his first professional goal in a 2–0 home EFL Trophy win over Tottenham Hotspur U21s. Having broken into the first team, a month later he was the subject of a transfer bid in December 2019 from an unnamed Championship club, which was rejected by Gillingham chairman Paul Scally and the same day Tucker signed a further contract extension with the club. He was named as the Kent side's young Player of the Season at the conclusion of the 2019–20 season.

On 6 March 2021, he scored his first league goal for Gillingham in a 3–1 victory over Ipswich Town.

Following the club's relegation to League Two at the end of the 2021–22 season, Tucker rejected the offer of a new deal in favour of a move elsewhere, bringing an end to his fifteen-year association with Gillingham. At the club's end of season awards he was named Young Player of the Season, winning the award for the third successive year and the fourth time overall.

=== Milton Keynes Dons ===
On 17 June 2022, Tucker signed for League One club Milton Keynes Dons on a long-term contract, with compensation owed to Gillingham due to his age. He made his debut on 30 July 2022 in a 1–0 defeat away to Cambridge United.

On 23 January 2025, Tucker joined League Two side Colchester United on loan for the remainder of the season.

On 16 May 2025, Milton Keynes Dons announced Tucker was one of three first team players to be released by the club.

=== Colchester United ===
On 1 July 2025, Tucker returned to Colchester United on a permanent deal following the expiry of his MK Dons contract.

== Career statistics ==
As of match played 21 November 2026

Appearances and goals by club, season and competition
Club	Season	League			FA Cup		League Cup		Other		Total	
Club	Season	Division	Apps	Goals	Apps	Goals	Apps	Goals	Apps	Goals	Apps	Goals
Gillingham	2017–18	League One	1	0	0	0	0	0	1 (Note: Appearance(s) in the EFL Trophy)	0	2	0
Gillingham	2018–19	League One	0	0	0	0	0	0	1	0	1	0
Gillingham	2019–20	League One	28	0	3	0	0	0	3	1	34	1
Gillingham	2020–21	League One	43	1	2	0	2	0	3	0	50	1
Gillingham	2021–22	League One	44	2	2	0	1	0	3	0	50	2
Gillingham	Total		116	3	7	0	3	0	11	1	137	4
Greenwich Borough (loan)	2017–18	Isthmian South	2	1	—		—		—		2	1
Hastings United (loan)	2018–19	Isthmian South East	7	0	—		—		—		7	0
Milton Keynes Dons	2022–23	League One	38	1	2	0	4	0	4	0	48	1
Milton Keynes Dons	2023–24	League Two	16	0	1	0	1	0	3 (Note: One appearance in the EFL Trophy, two appearances in the 2023–24 EFL League Two play-offs)	0	21	0
Milton Keynes Dons	2024–25	League Two	9	0	0	0	1	0	2	0	12	0
Milton Keynes Dons	Total		63	1	3	0	6	0	9	0	81	1
Colchester United (loan)	2024–25	League Two	10	0	0	0	0	0	0	0	10	0
Colchester United	2025–26	League Two	46	2	1	0	1	0	4	2	52	4
Colchester United	2026–27	League Two	15	0	1	0	1	0	3	0	20	0
Colchester United	Total		61	2	2	0	2	0	7	2	72	4
Career total			259	7	12	0	11	0	27	3	309	10

== Honours ==
Individual

- Gillingham Young Player of the Season: 2017–18, 2019–20, 2020–21, 2021–22
