= Trae Coyle =

English footballer

Personal information
- Full name: Trae Bailey Coyle
- Date of birth: 11 January 2001 (age 25)
- Place of birth: Camden, England
- Height: 1.80 m (5 ft 11 in)
- Position: Winger

Youth career
- 2009–2020: Arsenal

Senior career*
| Years | Team | Apps | (Gls) |
| 2020–2021 | Arsenal | 0 | (0) |
| 2020–2021 | → Gillingham (loan) | 13 | (2) |
| 2021–2025 | Lausanne-Sport | 61 | (6) |
| 2025–2026 | Waterford | 33 | (0) |

International career
- England U17
- * Club domestic league appearances and goals as of 17:52, 9 November 2026 (UTC)

Trae Bailey Coyle (born 11 January 2001) is an English professional footballer who plays as a winger.

== Club career ==
Born in Camden, Coyle began his career at Arsenal, joining the club in 2009. He signed on loan for Gillingham in August 2020. He scored his first goal for Gillingham in an EFL Trophy tie against Crawley Town on 8 September 2020. He was recalled by Arsenal in January 2021.

On 21 June 2021 he moved to Swiss club Lausanne-Sport.

On 2 January 2025, Coyle signed for League of Ireland Premier Division club Waterford on a multi-year contract. On 11 November 2026, it was announced that Coyle had been released following the end of his contract.

== International career ==
He has represented England at under-17 level.
