= Tom Hadler =

English footballer

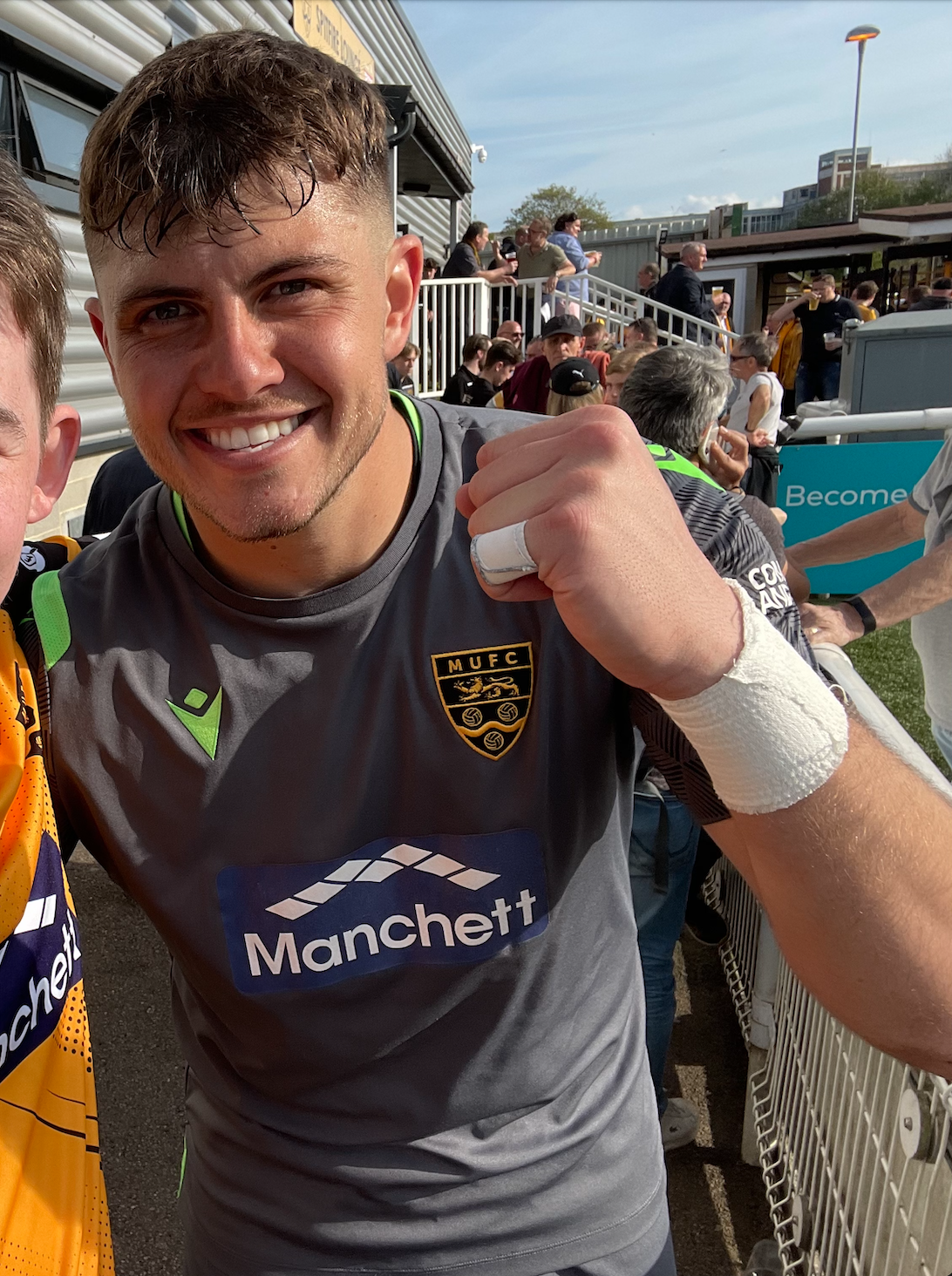
- Hadler with Maidstone United.

Personal information
- Date of birth: 30 July 1996 (age 30)
- Place of birth: Canterbury, England
- Height: 1.87 m (6 ft 2 in)
- Position: Goalkeeper

Team information
- Current team: Faversham Town

Youth career
- –2011: Gillingham
- 2012–2015: Gillingham

Senior career*
Years	Team	Apps	(Gls)
2014–2019	Gillingham	1	(0)
2014	→ Folkestone Invicta (loan)		
2015	→ Tonbridge Angels (loan)	13	(0)
2015	→ Gloucester City (loan)	1	(0)
2016	→ Grays Athletic (loan)	5	(0)
2017–2018	→ Gloucester City (loan)	20	(0)
2019–2020	Eastbourne Borough	22	(0)
2020–2021	Ebbsfleet United	3	(0)
2021–2023	Maidstone United	37	(0)
2023–2026	Ramsgate	73	(0)
2026–	Faversham Town	0	(0)
- * Club domestic league appearances and goals as of 13:05, 20 May 2026 (UTC)

Tom Hadler (born 30 July 1996) is an English professional footballer who plays as a goalkeeper for Isthmian League South East Division club Faversham Town.

== Early and personal life ==
Born in Canterbury, Hadler attended the Simon Langton Grammar School for Boys in the city.

== Career ==
=== Gillingham ===
Hadler joined the Gillingham youth set up before leaving at the age of 15 "to concentrate on his studies". He re-joined the club on a part-time basis during the 2012–13 season, and turned professional in 2015. He spent loan spells at non-league clubs Folkestone Invicta, Tonbridge Angels, Grays Athletic and Gloucester City, He became the club's second-choice goalkeeper in February 2018, before making his senior debut for Gillingham on 21 April 2018 in a 3–0 home defeat in the league against Blackpool. Despite the result, he was praised by manager Steve Lovell.

He was released by Gillingham at the end of the 2018–19 season, having made only three further appearances for the side, all in the EFL Trophy.

=== Eastbourne Borough ===
On 25 June 2019, Hadler signed for Eastbourne Borough who play in the National League South. He made his debut for the side on the opening day of the 2019–20 season in a 1–0 away loss to Billericay Town.

=== Ebsfleet United ===
On 16 July 2020 he signed for National League South side Ebbsfleet United.

=== Maidstone United ===
In June 2021, Hadler joined Maidstone United of the National League South, winning the league title that year. Following their relegation at the end of the 2022–23 season, he was released by the club.

=== Ramsgate ===
On 16 May 2023, Hadler was announced to have agreed to sign for Isthmian League South East Division club Ramsgate.

He was part of the Ramsgate squad that was promoted as champions in the 2024–25 season, although he suffered a torn ACL injury on the day that the title was secured.

=== Faversham Town ===
In May 2026, Hadler returned to the Isthmian League South East Division, joining Faversham Town.

== Honours ==
Maidstone United

- National League South: 2021–22

Ramsgate

- Isthmian League South East Division: 2024–25
