= Christian Maghoma =

Democratic Republic of the Congo footballer

Personal information
- Full name: Christian Maghoma
- Date of birth: 8 November 1997 (age 29)
- Place of birth: Lubumbashi, DR Congo
- Height: 1.85 m (6 ft 1 in)
- Position: Centre-back

Team information
- Current team: Havant & Waterlooville

Youth career
- 2014–2015: Tottenham Hotspur

Senior career*
Years	Team	Apps	(Gls)
2015–2018	Tottenham Hotspur	0	(0)
2015–2016	→ Yeovil Town (loan)	0	(0)
2018–2020	Arka Gdynia	35	(0)
2020–2022	Gillingham	4	(0)
2021–2022	→ Eastleigh (loan)	17	(1)
2022–2023	Eastleigh	25	(1)
2023–2025	Aldershot Town	25	(0)
2025–2026	Dagenham and Redbridge	32	(0)
2026–	Havant & Waterlooville	7	(0)

International career
2012	England U16	1	(0)
2017	DR Congo	1	(0)
- * Club domestic league appearances and goals as of 17:32, 9 October 2026 (UTC)

Christian Maghoma (born 8 November 1997) is a Congolese professional footballer who plays as a centre back for Southern League Premier Division South club Havant & Waterlooville.

== Club career ==
Maghoma signed for Tottenham Hotspur in July 2014. He went on loan in 2015 to Yeovil Town of EFL League Two but did not make any competitive appearances. He was released from his contract at the end of the 2017–18 season.

On 18 June 2018 Maghoma was signed by Polish club Arka Gdynia on a three-year deal. Maghoma made his debut for the club coming in the 60th minute in the 2018 Polish Super Cup where Arka Gdynia beat Legia Warsaw 3–2.

On 26 August 2020, Maghoma signed for Gillingham on a permanent contract. On 20 August 2021, Maghoma joined National League side Eastleigh on loan until January 2022. Following relegation to League Two, Maghoma was released at the end of the 2021–22 season.

On 16 June 2022, Maghoma was announced to be returning to Eastleigh on a permanent basis upon the expiration of his contract with Gillingham.

On 21 July 2023, Maghoma agreed to join fellow National League club, Aldershot Town. The following day from his signing, Maghoma sustained a ruptured achilles in a pre-season friendly against Wycombe Wanderers. Despite being subsequently limited to just six minutes of league action, he signed a new contract at the end of the 2023–24 season. On 19 May 2025, it was announced that Maghoma would leave the club at the end of his contract in June.

On 15 July 2025, Maghoma signed for National League South club, Dagenham and Redbridge on a one-year deal.

In July 2026, Maghoma joined Southern League Premier Division South club Havant & Waterlooville.

== International career ==
Maghoma made one appearance for the England national under-16 football team in a victory over Northern Ireland U16s for the 2012 Victory Shield on 27 September 2012.

Maghoma was called up to the DR Congo national football team in May 2017. Maghoma made his debut for DR Congo in a 2–0 friendly win over Botswana on 5 June 2017.

== Personal life ==
Maghoma was born in Lubumbashi, DR Congo and brought up in London, where he attended Finchley Catholic High School in North Finchley. Christian is the younger brother of the footballer Jacques Maghoma who came through the ranks of Tottenham Hotspur academy, and is the older brother of Paris Maghoma who plays for Norwich City.

== Career statistics ==
As of match played 6 April 2026

Appearances and goals by club, season and competition
Club	Season	League			National cup (Note: Includes Polish Cup, FA Cup)		League cup (Note: Includes EFL Cup)		Other		Total	
Club	Season	Division	Apps	Goals	Apps	Goals	Apps	Goals	Apps	Goals	Apps	Goals
Yeovil Town (loan)	2015–16	League Two	0	0	0	0	—		0	0	0	0
Tottenham Hotspur U23	2017–18	—			—		—		3 (Note: Appearances in EFL Trophy)	0	3	0
Arka Gdynia	2018–19	Ekstraklasa	15	0	2	0	—		1 (Note: Appearance in Polish Super Cup)	0	18	0
Arka Gdynia	2019–20	Ekstraklasa	20	0	1	0	—		—		21	0
Arka Gdynia	Total		35	0	3	0	—		1	0	39	0
Gillingham	2020–21	League One	4	0	1	0	3	0	3	0	11	0
Gillingham	2021–22	League One	0	0	—		1	0	—		1	0
Gillingham	Total		4	0	1	0	4	0	3	0	12	0
Eastleigh (loan)	2021–22	National League	17	1	3	1	—		2 (Note: Appearances in FA Trophy)	0	22	2
Eastleigh	2022–23	National League	25	1	0	0	—		3	0	28	1
Eastleigh	Total		42	2	3	1	—		5	0	50	3
Aldershot Town	2023–24	National League	2	0	0	0	—		0	0	2	0
Aldershot Town	2024–25	National League	23	0	2	0	—		5 (Note: two appearances and one goal in FA Trophy, three appearances and one goal in National League Cup)	2	30	2
Aldershot Town	Total		25	0	2	0	—		5	2	32	2
Dagenham & Redbridge	2025–26	National League South	32	0	2	0	—		3	1	37	1
Career total			138	2	11	1	4	0	20	3	173	6

== Honours ==
Arka Gdynia

- Polish Super Cup: 2018
