= Ryan Lloyd =

English footballer (born 1994)

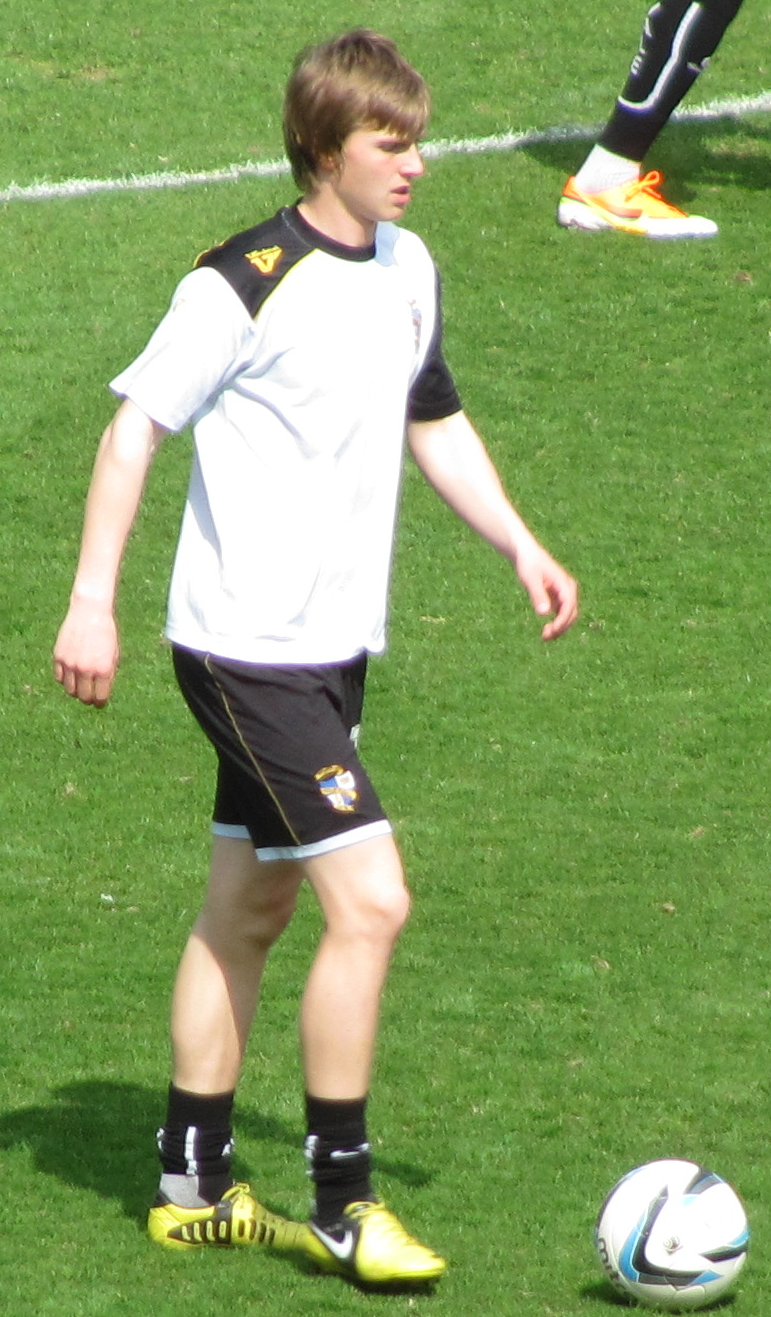
- Lloyd warming up for Port Vale before a match against Northampton Town on 20 April 2013.

Personal information
- Full name: Ryan Anthony Lloyd
- Date of birth: 1 February 1994 (age 32)
- Place of birth: Newcastle-under-Lyme, England
- Height: 5 ft 10 in (1.78 m)
- Positions: Left winger; central midfielder

Youth career
- 2002–2011: Port Vale

Senior career*
Years	Team	Apps	(Gls)
2011–2017	Port Vale	17	(0)
2013	→ Tamworth (loan)	6	(0)
2015–2016	→ Chester (loan)	22	(0)
2016–2017	→ Chester (loan)	41	(3)
2017–2019	Macclesfield Town	40	(4)
2019–2020	Port Vale	6	(0)
2020–2023	Hereford	79	(4)
Total		211	(11)
- * Club domestic league appearances and goals

Ryan Anthony Lloyd (born 1 February 1994) is an English former professional footballer who played as a midfielder

Lloyd began his career at Port Vale and helped the club to secure promotion out of League Two in 2012–13, and then played on loan at Tamworth in September 2013 and Chester in the 2015–16 and 2016–17 campaigns. He signed with Macclesfield Town in June 2017 on a two-year deal and helped the club to win promotion to the English Football League as champions of the National League in 2017–18. He rejoined Port Vale for one year in June 2019 and signed with Hereford in October 2020. He played for Hereford in the 2021 FA Trophy final.

== Career ==
=== Port Vale ===
Born in Newcastle-under-Lyme, Lloyd started his career in the youth team ranks at Port Vale, starting in the club's under-nine side. His debut came on 30 April 2011, as he came off the bench at Vale Park to replace Rob Taylor seventy minutes into a 7–2 win over Morecambe; Joe Davis also made his debut at the same time. This came days before a week-long trial at Premier League side Fulham. He was identified as a technically gifted player. Still a youth team player in 2011–12, he made his second senior appearance in a 2–0 defeat at Whaddon Road on 19 November, replacing Doug Loft after Cheltenham Town had already made the game safe. He agreed a new two-year deal with the club in June 2012. He started the 2012–13 season on the bench, and assistant manager Mark Grew said his performances as a substitute "proved he's good enough" for a first-team place, though he would only start a game due to suspensions or injuries to the highly impressive wing duo Ashley Vincent and Jennison Myrie-Williams. Vale were promoted at the end of the season, with Lloyd largely restricted to reserve team football.

He joined Conference Premier club Tamworth on a one-month loan on 31 August 2013, and made his "Lambs" debut later that day in a 3–0 defeat to Cambridge United at Abbey Stadium. In total he made five starts and one substitute appearance during his spell at The Lamb Ground. At the end of the 2013–14 season he featured in Vale's Staffordshire Senior Cup final defeat to Rushall Olympic. He signed a new one-year contract in June 2014. He failed to make an appearance under new manager Rob Page in the 2014–15 season, but signed a new one-year contract in June 2015.

He was tipped for a breakthrough season ahead of the 2015–16 campaign by youth team coach Mick Ede. He joined National League club Chester on a one-month loan beginning on 24 November. He found it difficult to adapt to the pace and physicality of the division, but impressed enough for Chester manager Steve Burr to extend his loan spell into until the end of the season. Lloyd returned for a second loan spell at Chester in August 2016. He scored his first goal in senior football on 27 August, in a 4–0 victory over Sutton United at the Deva Stadium. Just two days later he scored again in a 3–1 defeat to Woking at Kingfield Stadium. His performance in a 2–0 victory over Aldershot Town on 17 December was good enough to win him a place in the non-League Team of the Week. Chester manager Jon McCarthy intended to keep Lloyd beyond the expiry of his loan spell in January 2017, but admitted that other clubs had also expressed an interest in the player. Divisional rivals Southport had a bid of £10,000 accepted by Port Vale chairman Norman Smurthwaite. However, Lloyd rejected the move and was allowed to rejoin Chester on loan for the remainder of the 2016–17 campaign. He was released by new Port Vale manager Michael Brown in May 2017. Lloyd said it was "frustrating being overlooked" and that "I feel like they always looked at me like I was still a young kid, I never got given an opportunity in the first team".

=== Macclesfield Town ===
Lloyd signed a two-year contract with National League club Macclesfield Town in June 2017. On 25 November, he scored from within his own half in a 1–1 draw at Maidenhead United. He scored four goals in 29 appearances in 2017–18 as John Askey's "Silkmen" won promotion back to the English Football League as champions of the National League. However, he featured just 14 times in the 2018–19 season and was not retained by manager Sol Campbell. He was a linked with a return to former club Port Vale, now managed by John Askey, who said "He has a feeling for the club, he lives locally, he has a good attitude and good ability. He'd be somebody I would be interested in." Lloyd went on to become one of six players – the others being Shamir Mullings, Elliott Durrell, Rhys Taylor, Jamie Grimes and Keith Lowe – to issue the club with a winding-up petition over unpaid wages.

=== Return to Port Vale ===
On 26 June 2019, following weeks of speculation, Lloyd rejoined Port Vale on a one-year deal. His signing was criticised by Vale some fans as the club showing a lack of ambition. Port Vale released him at the end of the 2019–20 season after making six league and six cup appearances.

=== Hereford ===
On 2 October 2020, Lloyd joined National League North club Hereford and was described as a "big signing" by manager Josh Gowling. He featured 19 times before the 2020–21 season was curtailed due to the ongoing COVID-19 pandemic in England. The FA Trophy continued however, and Hereford made it to the final against Hornchurch at Wembley Stadium, where they would lose 3–1. Speaking in July 2021, he said that "I'd love to chip in with a few goals... I think that I will get a bit more of a licence to go forward a bit more this season now we've got the likes of James Vincent". Speaking in February 2022, Gowling said that "Lloyd is one of those players whose work goes unnoticed" as he picked up a rare injury. Lloyd featured 34 times in the 2021–22 campaign and was offered a new contract in the summer. He was released by new manager Paul Caddis at the end of the 2022–23 season.

== Style of play ==
Port Vale manager Rob Page described Lloyd as energetic and athletic, with good vision and timing; Lloyd can play in central midfield despite being a natural left-winger. The Macclesfield Town website described him as "an exciting and tenacious midfielder, who has a clear natural talent and a fabulous eye for goal".

== Personal life ==
Lloyd is a keen angler and was featured in the Angling Times after catching a 44 pounds (20 kg) mirror carp named "Kev's Linear" from Oxfordshire's Linch Hill complex in 2014.

== Career statistics ==
Appearances and goals by club, season and competition
Club	Season	League			FA Cup		EFL Cup		Other		Total	
Club	Season	Division	Apps	Goals	Apps	Goals	Apps	Goals	Apps	Goals	Apps	Goals
Port Vale	2010–11	League Two	1	0	0	0	0	0	0	0	1	0
Port Vale	2011–12	League Two	2	0	0	0	0	0	0	0	2	0
Port Vale	2012–13	League Two	6	0	0	0	0	0	1 (Note: Appearance(s) in Football League Trophy)	0	7	0
Port Vale	2013–14	League One	3	0	0	0	0	0	0	0	3	0
Port Vale	2014–15	League One	0	0	0	0	0	0	0	0	0	0
Port Vale	2015–16	League One	5	0	0	0	0	0	0	0	5	0
Port Vale	2016–17	EFL League One	0	0	0	0	0	0	0	0	0	0
Port Vale	Total		17	0	0	0	0	0	1	0	18	0
Tamworth (loan)	2013–14	Conference Premier	6	0	0	0	—		0	0	6	0
Chester (loan)	2015–16	National League	22	0	0	0	—		4 (Note: Three appearances in FA Trophy and one appearance in Cheshire Senior Cup)	0	26	0
Chester (loan)	2016–17	National League	41	3	1	0	—		3 (Note: Appearance(s) in FA Trophy)	0	45	3
Chester (loan)	Total		63	3	1	0	0	0	7	0	71	3
Macclesfield Town	2017–18	National League	27	4	2	0	—		0	0	29	4
Macclesfield Town	2018–19	EFL League Two	13	0	1	0	0	0	0	0	14	0
Macclesfield Town	Total		40	4	3	0	0	0	0	0	43	4
Port Vale	2019–20	League Two	6	0	0	0	1	0	5 (Note: Appearance(s) in EFL Trophy)	0	12	0
Hereford	2020–21	National League North	13	0	0	0	—		7 (Note: Appearance(s) in FA Trophy)	0	20	0
Hereford	2021–22	National League North	32	2	1	0	—		1 (Note: Appearance(s) in FA Trophy)	0	34	2
Hereford	2022–23	National League North	34	2	0	0	—		0	0	34	2
Hereford	Total		79	4	1	0	0	0	8	0	88	4
Career total			211	11	5	0	1	0	21	0	238	11

== Honours ==
Port Vale

- Football League Two third-place promotion: 2012–13

Macclesfield Town

- National League: 2017–18

Hereford

- FA Trophy runner-up: 2020–21
