= 2021 FA Trophy final =

2021 FA Trophy Final
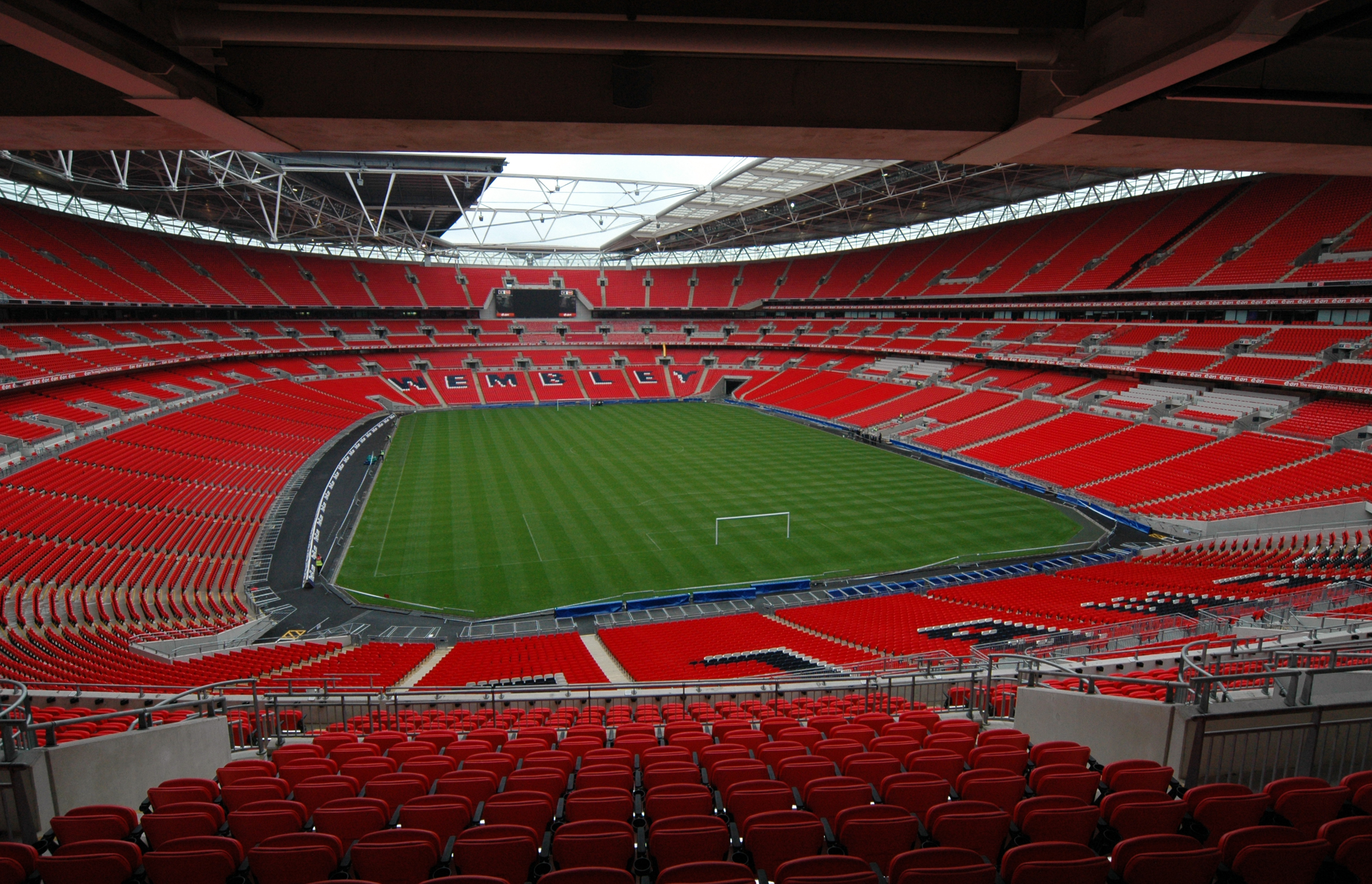
- Wembley Stadium hosted the final
- Event: 2020–21 FA Trophy
Hereford	Hornchurch
1	3
- Date: 22 May 2021
- Venue: Wembley Stadium, London
- Man of the Match: Liam Nash
- Referee: Tony Harrington

The 2021 FA Trophy final was an association football match played between Hereford and Hornchurch at Wembley Stadium, London, England on 22 May 2021. It was the final match of the 2020–21 FA Trophy, the 52nd season of the FA Trophy. Hornchurch won the match 3–1, securing their maiden FA Trophy.

Hornchurch's season in the Isthmian League Premier Division was suspended in November 2020 due to the COVID-19 pandemic and they were unable to play any league football. During this time they were financially supported by West Ham United chairman, David Sullivan who once lived in Hornchurch. Likewise Hereford's season in the National League North had been declared null and void on 18 February 2021, having played their last league fixture of the season two days prior.

== Route to the Final ==
=== Hereford ===
15 December 2020 Second Round	Hereford	3–0	St Neots Town	Hereford
19:45 GMT	Grimes 17'; Finn 25'; John-Lewis 66'			Stadium: Edgar Street; Attendance: 285

19 December 2020 Third Round	Nantwich Town	0–1	Hereford	Nantwich
15:00 GMT			John-Lewis	Stadium: Weaver Stadium; Attendance: 433

19 January 2021 Fourth Round	Stamford	0–2	Hereford	Stamford
19:45 GMT			Owen-Evans 10', 75'	Stadium: Zeeco Stadium; Attendance: 0

6 February 2021 Fifth Round	Hereford	1–0	Leamington	Hereford
15:00 GMT	Camwell 4'			Stadium: Edgar Street; Attendance: 0

27 February 2021 Quarter-Final	Aldershot Town	1–1 (3–5 p)	Hereford	Aldershot
15:00 GMT	Rees 90+3'		Bakare 6'	Stadium: EBB Stadium; Attendance: 0
	Penalties
	Whittingham (penalty scored); Miller (penalty scored); Rees (penalty scored); Bettamer (penalty missed)		Owen-Evans (penalty scored); Bakare (penalty scored); Grimes (penalty scored); Lloyd (penalty scored); Haines (penalty scored)

27 March 2021 Semi-Final	Hereford	1–0	Woking	Hereford
15:00 GMT	Butlin 21'			Stadium: Edgar Street; Attendance: 0

=== Hornchurch ===
31 October 2020 Third Qualifying Round	Bowers & Pitsea	1–3	Hornchurch	Pitsea
15:00 GMT	Albon 15' (pen.)		Osborn 66'; Brown 68'; Ruff 90+3'	Stadium: Gun Meadow Stadium; Attendance: 260

8 December 2020 First Round	Hornchurch	4–1	Wingate & Finchley	Upminster
19:45 GMT	Muldoon 13'; Ruff 37'; Higgins 56'; Nash 88'		Tejan-Sie 16'	Stadium: Hornchurch Stadium; Attendance: 208

15 December 2020 Second Round	Tonbridge Angels	0–1	Hornchurch	Tonbridge
19:45 GMT			Christou 90'	Stadium: Longmead Stadium; Attendance: 0

19 December 2020 Third Round	Dulwich Hamlet	1–2	Hornchurch	East Dulwich
15:00 GMT	Ming 16' (pen.)		Higgins 26' (pen.); Ruff 86'	Stadium: Champion Hill; Attendance: 0

16 January 2021 Fourth Round	Hornchurch	1–1 (3–0 p)	King's Lynn Town	Upminster
15:00 GMT	Nash 52'		Mitchell 18'	Stadium: Hornchurch Stadium; Attendance: 0
	Penalties
	Clark (penalty scored); Brown (penalty scored); Higgins (penalty scored)		Marriott (penalty missed); Gash (penalty missed); King (penalty missed)

6 February 2021 Fifth Round	Hornchurch	5–4	Maidstone United	Upminster
15:00 GMT	Higgins 13', 58'; Winn 41'; Ellul 65' (o.g.); Nash 90+7'		Christou 16' (o.g.); Porter 29', 59'; Rendell 71'	Stadium: Hornchurch Stadium; Attendance: 0

27 February 2021 Quarter Final	Darlington	1–2	Hornchurch	Darlington
15:00 GMT	Sousa 45+2'		Nash 26'; Higgins 54' (pen.)	Stadium: Blackwell Meadows; Attendance: 0

27 March 2021 Semi-Final	Notts County (5)	3–3 (4–5 p)	Hornchurch (7)	Nottingham
15:00	Wootton 10'; Rodrigues 42'; Sam 78'		Spence 38'; Nash 45+3', 90+1'	Stadium: Meadow Lane; Attendance: 0
	Penalties
	Wootton (penalty scored); O'Brien (penalty scored); Reeves (penalty missed); Knowles (penalty scored); Sam (penalty scored)		Clark (penalty scored); Nash (penalty scored); Muldoon (penalty scored); Hayles (penalty scored); Dickson (penalty scored)

== Match ==
=== Details ===
22 May 2021
16:15 BST

Hereford	1–3	Hornchurch
Owen-Evans 13'	Report	Hayles (yellow card) 40'; Ruff 75'; Nash 86', (yellow card) 87'; Brown 90+5'; Parcell (yellow card) 90+5'

Wembley Stadium, London
Attendance: 6,000
Referee: Tony Harrington

Hereford	Hornchurch

GK	20	(England) Brandon Hall
RB	2	(England) Jared Hodgkiss (c)
CB	6	(England) Jamie Grimes
CB	3	(England) Luke Haines
LB	33	(England) Lewis Butroid
RM	11	(Republic of Ireland) Kyle Finn	(substituted off) 88'
CM	10	(England) Tom Owen-Evans
CM	17	(England) Ryan Lloyd
LM	7	(England) Chris Camwell	(substituted off) 74'
CF	8	(England) Joey Butlin
CF	25	(England) Michael Bakare	(substituted off) 90'
Substitutes:
GK	1	(Republic of Ireland) Paul White
DF	4	(England) Ben Pollock
DF	12	(England) Kennedy Digie
DF	24	(Wales) Dylan Jones
MF	16	(Northern Ireland) James McQuilkin	(substituted on) 74'
MF	18	(England) Yan Klukowski	(substituted on) 90'
MF	34	(Afghanistan) Maziar Kouhyar	(substituted on) 88'
Manager:
(England) Josh Gowling

GK	24	(England) Joe Wright
DF	2	(England) Mickey Parcell	(yellow card) 90+5'
DF	3	(England) Remi Sutton
DF	5	(England) Rickie Hayles	(yellow card) 40'
DF	6	(England) Ollie Muldoon
MF	4	(England) Jordan Clark
MF	7	(England) Joe Christou
MF	8	(England) Lewwis Spence (c)		(substituted off) 59'
MF	11	(England) Ellis Brown
FW	9	(England) Sam Higgins		(substituted off) 60'
FW	10	(England) Liam Nash	(yellow card) 87'	(substituted off) 90+1'
Substitutes:
GK	3	(England) Finley Thackway
DF	20	(England) Nathan Cooper
MF	16	(England) Charlie Ruff		(substituted on) 59'
MF	17	(Somalia) Sak Hassan
FW	12	(England) Charlie Stimson		(substituted on) 90+1'
FW	14	(England) Ronnie Winn
FW	19	(Ghana) Chris Dickson		(substituted on) 60'
Manager:
(England) Mark Stimson
