= List of Chester F.C. seasons =

Chester Football Club is an association football club based in Chester. They are currently members of the National League North, the sixth tier of English football, and play at the Deva Stadium.

The club was founded in 2010 following the liquidation of Chester City. In its inaugural season it competed in Division One North of the Northern Premier League, following a successful appeal to the Football Association against its initial placement in the North West Counties League. After winning this division, they then won the Northern League Premier Division in 2011–12 and the Conference North in 2012–13. Chester returned to the National League North following relegation in 2017–18.

== Seasons ==
Year	League														Cup competitions							Manager
Year	Division	Lvl	Pld	W	D	L	GF	GA	GD	Pts	Position	Leading league scorer		Average attendance	FA Cup		FA Trophy		Other competitions			Manager
Year	Division	Lvl	Pld	W	D	L	GF	GA	GD	Pts	Position	Name	Goals	Average attendance	Res	Rec	Res	Rec	Competition	Res	Rec	Manager
Club formed after Chester City was expelled from the Football Conference and subsequently wound up in March 2010.
2010–11	Northern Premier League; Division One North	8	44	29	10	5	107	36	+71	97	1st of 23	Michael Wilde	36	2,382	– (Note: Ineligible for competition as a new club.)		– (Note: Ineligible for competition as a new club.)		Cheshire Cup; League Cup; Presidents Cup	R2; R2; SF	0–0–1; 1–0–1; 4–0–1	Neil Young
2011–12	Northern Premier League; Premier Division	7	42	31	7	4	102	29	+73	100	1st of 22	Chris Simm	15	2,789	– (Note: Ineligible for competition as a new club.)		R2	3–0–1	Cheshire Cup; League Cup	R2; R3	0–0–1; 0–0–1	Neil Young
2012–13	Conference North	6	42	34	5	3	103	32	+69	107	1st of 22	Nathan Jarman	14	2,582	QR3	1–2–1	QR3	0–1–1	Cheshire Cup	W	5–0–0	Neil Young
2013–14	Conference Premier	5	46	12	15	19	49	70	-21	51	21st of 24	Gareth Seddon	7	2,366	QR4	0–0–1	R1	0–0–1	Cheshire Cup	R2	1–0–1	Neil Young; Gary Jones; Steve Burr
2014–15	Conference Premier	5	46	19	6	21	64	76	-12	63	12th of 24	John Rooney	11	2,189	R2	2–1–1	R1	0–2–0	Cheshire Cup	R1	0–0–1	Steve Burr
Fifth and sixth tier divisions renamed.
2015–16	National; League	5	46	14	12	20	67	71	-4	54	17th of 24	Ross Hannah	23	2,199	QR4	0–0–1	R3	2–0–1	Cheshire Cup	SF	3–0–1	Steve Burr; Jon McCarthy
2016–17	National; League	5	46	14	10	22	63	71	-8	52	19th of 24	James Alabi	17	2,031	QR4	0–0–1	R2	1–0–1	Cheshire Cup	R1	0–1–0	Jon McCarthy
2017–18	National; League	5	46	8	13	25	42	79	-37	37	23rd of 24	James Akintunde; Ross Hannah	8	1,827	QR4	0–0–1	R2	0–1–1	Cheshire Cup	PR	0–1–0	Jon McCarthy; Tom Shaw; Marcus Bignot; Calum McIntyre
2018–19	National; League; North	6	42	16	14	12	60	62	-2	62	9th of 22	Anthony Dudley	11	1,839	QR3	1–0–1	QR3	0–1–1	Cheshire Cup	QF	2–0–1	Anthony Johnson & Bernard Morley
2019–20	National; League; North	6	32	15	9	8	58	38	+20	54	6th of 22	Akwasi Asante	18	2,019	QR2	0–1–1	R2	2–1–1	Cheshire Cup	QF (Note: Due to COVID-19 semifinals were never played.)	3–0–0	Anthony Johnson & Bernard Morley
2019–20	National; League; North	6	The regular season was cut short due to COVID-19, final league positions decided by points-per-game Lost in the play-off quarter-final.												QR2	0–1–1	R2	2–1–1	Cheshire Cup	QF	3–0–0	Anthony Johnson & Bernard Morley
2020–21	National; League; North	6	17	8	4	5	32	24	+8	28	3rd of 22	Danny Elliott	7	403 (Note: Most of the games were played behind the closed doors.)	QR4	1–1–1	R3	1–0–1	–			Anthony Johnson & Bernard Morley
2020–21	National; League; North	6	The season was declared null and void due to COVID-19												QR4	1–1–1	R3	1–0–1	–			Anthony Johnson & Bernard Morley
2021–22	National; League; North	6	42	12	11	19	70	71	-1	47	16th of 22	Marcus Dackers; Declan Weeks	9	1,620	QR3	1–2–1	R2	0–0–1	Cheshire Cup	R1	0–0–1	Anthony Johnson & Bernard Morley; Danny Livesey; Steve Watson
2022–23	National; League; North	6	46	22	18	6	72	41	+31	84	3rd of 24	Kurt Willoughby	20	2,231	QR4	2–3–0	R3	1–1–0	Cheshire Cup	R1	0–1–0	Calum McIntyre
2022–23	National; League; North	6	Lost in the play-off semi-final.												QR4	2–3–0	R3	1–1–0	Cheshire Cup	R1	0–1–0	Calum McIntyre
2023–24	National; League; North	6	46	18	15	13	58	37	+21	69	10th of 24	George Glendon	12	2,198	R1	3–1–1	R2	0–1–0	Cheshire Cup	R1	0–0–1	Calum McIntyre
2024–25	National; League; North	6	46	25	12	9	73	45	+28	87	4th of 24	Tom Peers	19	2,294	QR4	2–1–1	R2	0–0–1	Cheshire Cup	R2	0–1–1	Calum McIntyre
2024–25	National; League; North	6	Lost in the play-off final.												QR4	2–1–1	R2	0–0–1	Cheshire Cup	R2	0–1–1	Calum McIntyre
2025-26	National; League; North	6	46	20	13	13	66	64	+2	73	7th of 24	Dylan Mottley-Henry	13	2,285	R1	3-1-1	R2	0-0-1	Cheshire Cup	R2	1-0-1	Calum McIntyre Connell Rawlinson
2025-26	National; League; North	6	Lost in the play-off quarter-final												R1	3-1-1	R2	0-0-1	Cheshire Cup	R2	1-0-1	Calum McIntyre Connell Rawlinson
2026-27 (Note: Season is still in progress)	National; League; North	6	15	8	2	5	18	14	+4	26	8th of 24	Billy Waters	6	2,463	QR3	1-0-1	R2	-	Cheshire Cup	R2	1-0-1	Phil Parkinson
