= Liam Nash =

English footballer

Personal information
- Full name: Liam Alexander Nash
- Date of birth: 19 January 1996 (age 30)
- Place of birth: Southend-on-Sea, England
- Height: 1.76 m (5 ft 9 in)
- Position: Striker

Team information
- Current team: Eastbourne Borough
- Number: 10

Senior career*
Years	Team	Apps	(Gls)
2013–2014	Hullbridge Sports		
2014–2015	Billericay Town		
2014	→ Great Wakering Rovers (loan)		
2014	→ Aveley (loan)		
2015	→ Aveley (loan)		
2015–2016	Aveley		
2016	Great Wakering Rovers		
2016–2017	Maldon & Tiptree	41	(33)
2017–2019	Gillingham	12	(0)
2017	→ Leatherhead (loan)		
2018	→ Dulwich Hamlet (loan)	2	(0)
2018–2019	→ Concord Rangers (loan)	12	(5)
2019	Cork City	5	(0)
2019–2020	Hemel Hempstead Town	17	(8)
2020	Dartford	8	(2)
2020	Boca Gibraltar		
2020–2025	Hornchurch	137	(71)
2023	→ Bruno's Magpies (loan)	0	(0)
2025	Worthing	18	(7)
2025–2026	Billericay Town	22	(4)
2026	→ Ramsgate (loan)	5	(0)
2026	Aveley	11	(5)
2026–	Eastbourne Borough	11	(5)
- * Club domestic league appearances and goals as of 23:34, 21 November 2026 2026 (UTC)

Liam Nash (born 19 January 1996) is an English semi-professional footballer who plays as a striker for Isthmian League Premier Division club Eastbourne Borough.

== Club career ==
Nash began his career at local side Hullbridge Sports, before joining Isthmian League Premier Division side Billericay Town after impressing at a young age. Following his arrival, Nash began to struggle at Billericay and instead had loan spells at Great Wakering Rovers and Aveley.

Following permanent spells at Great Wakering Rovers and Aveley, Nash joined Maldon & Tiptree, where he netted 36 goals in 47 appearances in all competitions in the 2016–17 campaign. He turned professional in July 2017 with Gillingham. After making ten appearances for them, he signed on loan for Leatherhead in November 2017. On 22 October 2018, Nash joined Concord Rangers on loan.

In January 2019 he went on trial with Irish club Cork City. In February 2019 he signed for the club. His contract with the club was mutually terminated in April 2019.

On 15 May 2019 Nash joined National League South side Hemel Hempstead Town. In January 2020 he moved to Dartford.

On 29 June 2020, Nash joined Boca Gibraltar of the Gibraltar National League.

In October 2020, he returned to England to join Isthmian League side Hornchurch. On 22 May 2021, Nash scored as the Urchins defeated Hereford 3–1 to win the 2021 FA Trophy Final.

In February 2025, he joined National League South side Worthing.

In May 2025, he signed for Isthmian League Premier Division side Billericay Town. In January 2026, he joined Ramsgate on a one-month loan. In February 2026, he returned to former club Aveley on a permanent basis.

In May 2026, he joined Eastbourne Borough following their relegation to the Isthmian League Premier Division.

== Career statistics ==
As of 21 November 2026

Appearances and goals by club, season and competition
Club	Season	League			National Cup		League Cup		Other		Total	
Club	Season	Division	Apps	Goals	Apps	Goals	Apps	Goals	Apps	Goals	Apps	Goals
Maldon & Tiptree	2016–17	Isthmian League; Division One North	41	33	0	0	—		5	3	46	36
Gillingham	2017–18	League One	12	0	0	0	1	0	1	0	14	0
Gillingham	2018–19	League One	0	0	0	0	0	0	1	0	1	0
Gillingham	Total		12	0	0	0	1	0	2	0	15	0
Dulwich Hamlet (loan)	2018–19	National League South	2	0	0	0	—		0	0	2	0
Concord Rangers (loan)	2018–19	National League South	12	5	0	0	—		0	0	12	5
Cork City	2019	League of Ireland	5	0	1	1	0	0	0	0	6	1
Hemel Hempstead Town	2019–20	National League South	17	8	0	0	—		0	0	17	8
Dartford	2019–20	National League South	8	2	0	0	—		3 (Note: Appearance(s) in Kent Senior Cup)	3	11	5
Hornchurch	2020–21	Isthmian Premier Division	0	0	0	0	—		8 (Note: Appearance(s) in FA Trophy)	6	8	6
Hornchurch	2021–22	Isthmian Premier Division	37	21	0	0	—		6	6	43	27
Hornchurch	2022–23	Isthmian Premier Division	37	21	0	0	—		7	6	44	27
Hornchurch	2023–24	Isthmian Premier Division	37	22	0	0	—		1	1	38	23
Hornchurch	2024–25	National League South	26	7	2	1	—		1	0	29	8
Hornchurch	Total		137	71	2	1	0	0	15	13	154	85
Bruno's Magpies (loan)	2023–24	Gibraltar Football League	0	0	0	0	—		2	0	2	0
Worthing	2024–25	National League South	18	7	0	0	—		1 (Note: Appearance(s) in National League South play-offs)	0	19	7
Billericay Town	2025–26	Isthmian Premier Division	22	4	5	0	—		1 (Note: Appearance(s) in Alan Turvey Trophy)	0	28	4
Ramsgate (loan)	2025–26	Isthmian Premier Division	5	0	—		—		0	0	5	0
Aveley	2025–26	Isthmian Premier Division	11	5	—		—		1 (Note: Appearance(s) in Isthmian League Premier Division play-offs)	0	12	5
Eastbourne Borough	2026–27	Isthmian Premier Division	11	5	1	1	—		2 (Note: One appearance in FA Trophy, one appearanceand one goal in Sussex Senior Cup)	1	14	7
Career total			301	140	9	3	1	0	40	26	351	164

== Honours ==
Hornchurch

- FA Trophy: 2020–21
