= Lewis Spence (disambiguation) =

Lewis Spence may refer to:

- Lewis Spence (1874–1955), Scottish journalist, poet, author, folklorist and occult scholar
- Lewis Spence (footballer) (born 1996), Scottish footballer for Scunthorpe United

== See also ==
- Lewwis Spence (born 1987), English footballer
