= Jamie Grimes =

English footballer (born 1990)

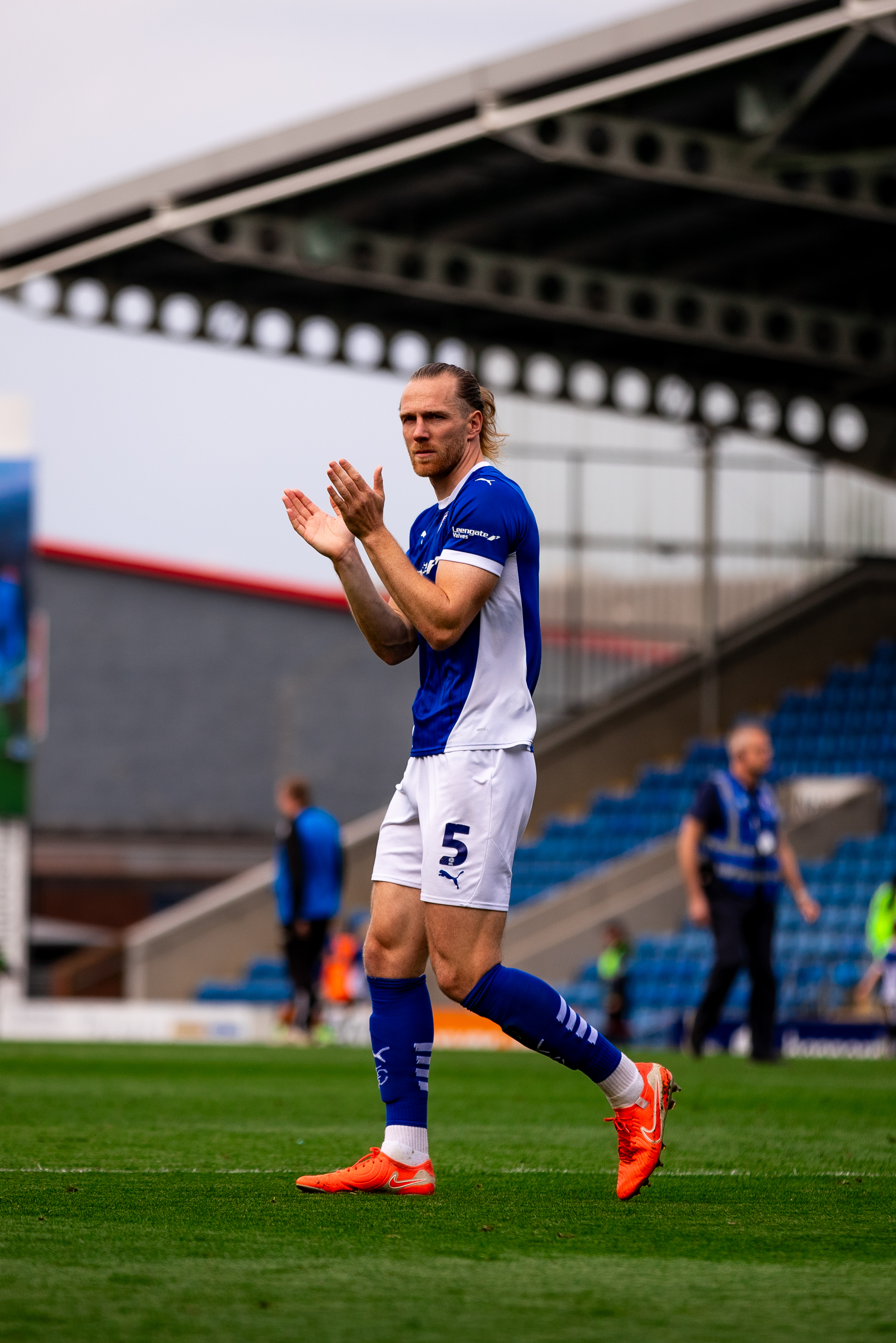
- Grimes applauding Chesterfield fans at the end of the 24/25 Sky Bet League Two campaign.

Personal information
- Full name: Jamie Neil Grimes
- Date of birth: 22 December 1990 (age 35)
- Place of birth: Nottingham, England
- Position: Centre-back

Team information
- Current team: Boston United (on loan from Chesterfield)

Youth career
- –2007: Leicester City
- 2007–2011: Swansea City

Senior career*
Years	Team	Apps	(Gls)
2009–2011	Swansea City	0	(0)
2009–2010	→ Haverfordwest County (loan)	30	(1)
2010	→ Forest Green Rovers (loan)	5	(0)
2011–2012	Redditch United		
2011	→ Brackley Town (loan)		
2012–2013	Bedford Town	28	(2)
2013–2015	Kidderminster Harriers	61	(0)
2014	→ Worcester City (loan)	6	(0)
2015–2017	Dover Athletic	77	(5)
2017–2018	Cheltenham Town	43	(3)
2018–2019	Macclesfield Town	11	(2)
2019–2020	Ebbsfleet United	33	(0)
2020–2021	Hereford	13	(0)
2021–2026	Chesterfield	166	(11)
2026	→ Boston United (loan)	16	(1)
2026–	Boston United	0	(0)
- * Club domestic league appearances and goals as of 14:27, 24 November 2024 (UTC)

Jamie Neil Grimes (born 22 December 1990) is an English professional footballer who plays as a centre-back for Boston United on loan from EFL League Two club Chesterfield.

== Club career ==
In July 2017, Grimes signed for League Two club Cheltenham Town from Dover Athletic on a free transfer. Grimes made his EFL debut for Cheltenham against Morecambe, on 5 August 2017. On 10 May 2018, it was announced that Grimes would leave Cheltenham at the end of his current deal in June 2018.

Following his release from Cheltenham, Grimes joined fellow League Two side Macclesfield Town, signing a one-year deal. Whilst at the club, Grimes was subject of unpaid wages from the club, leading to a winding up order set for September 2019. Grimes left the club after just one season and returned to Kent to play for Ebbsfleet United. Grimes departed the club after one season with the club having been relegated in the early curtailed season, finding themselves in the relegation zone after the season was determined on a points-per-game basis.

On 4 August 2020, Grimes joined National League North side Hereford on a one-year deal. Following the early curtailment of the season due to the ongoing COVID-19 pandemic, Grimes appeared at Wembley in the FA Trophy Final as Hereford lost a one-goal lead to lose 3–1 to Hornchurch. Grimes was offered a new deal with the club at the end of the season however he turned down this contract offer.

=== Chesterfield ===
On 15 June 2021, Grimes agreed a deal to join Chesterfield. He was made club captain prior to the start of the 2022-23 season.

On 8 January 2022, Grimes came off the bench to play against UEFA Champions League holders Chelsea at Stamford Bridge, as Chesterfield lost 5-1.

On 23 March 2024, Grimes scored a brace against Boreham Wood in order to secure the Spireite's promotion as champions back to the Football League.

On 5 February, Grimes joined National League side Boston United on loan for the rest of the season.

On 22 May 2026, Chesterfield announced the player was being released.

On 23 July 2026, Jamie Grimes rejoined Boston United after being on loan their the season prior.

== Honours ==
Chesterfield

- National League: 2023–24

Individual

- National League Team of the Season: 2023–24
