= Luke Haines (footballer) =

English footballer (born 2000)

Personal information
- Full name: Luke Ryan Haines
- Date of birth: 15 October 2000 (age 26)
- Place of birth: Swindon, England
- Position: Defender

Team information
- Current team: Chippenham Town
- Number: 6

Youth career
- 2007–2019: Swindon Town

Senior career*
Years	Team	Apps	(Gls)
2019–2021	Swindon Town	0	(0)
2019–2020	→ Chippenham Town (loan)	20	(1)
2020	→ Chippenham Town (loan)	5	(1)
2020	→ Hereford (loan)	3	(0)
2020–2021	→ Hereford (loan)	4	(0)
2021–2023	Hereford	60	(7)
2023–	Chippenham Town	111	(9)
- * Club domestic league appearances and goals as of 18:08, 19 April 2025 (UTC)

Luke Ryan Haines (born 15 October 2000) is an English professional footballer who plays as a midfielder for Chippenham Town.

== Early and personal life ==
Haines was born in Swindon and grew up in Highworth, Wiltshire. He supported Swindon Town as a child.

== Career ==
He first joined Swindon Town's academy at the age of 6 in 2007 and signed his first contract aged 8, before signing his first professional contract with the club in May 2019. He joined National League South side Chippenham Town on loan in July 2019, and made his debut for the club in a 0–0 draw away to St Albans City on 3 August 2019, their opening game of the season. He won Chippenham Town's man of the match award for his performance. Haines scored his first goal for the club on 28 September 2020 with the opening goal of a 2–2 draw at home to Dulwich Hamlet. He returned to Swindon Town in December 2019, having made 20 league appearances, scoring once, for Chippenham.

He rejoined Chippenham Town on loan until the end of the season in February 2020. His first appearance back at Chippenham came on 8 February 2020 in a 1–0 victory away to Hemel Hempstead Town, before scoring his second goal for Chippenham in their following match with the only goal of a 1–0 victory at home to Maidstone United. He made 5 appearances over this spell, scoring once, prior to the early suspension of the season in March 2020 due to the COVID-19 pandemic.

He joined Hereford on loan on 2 October 2020 on a three-month loan. He appeared three times in the National League North before being recalled later that month. Haines made his debut for Swindon Town on 10 November 2020 in a 1–0 EFL Trophy victory away to Forest Green Rovers. On 26 December 2020, Haines rejoined Hereford on a three-month loan deal.

Haines was subsequently signed on a permanent basis by Hereford on 17 May 2021. He was released by the club at the end of the 2022-23 season. In May 2023, he returned to Chippenham Town having had two previous loan spells with the club.

== Career statistics ==
As of match played 9 November 2024

Appearances and goals by club, season and competition
Club	Season	League			FA Cup		EFL Cup		Other		Total	
Club	Season	Division	Apps	Goals	Apps	Goals	Apps	Goals	Apps	Goals	Apps	Goals
Swindon Town	2019–20	League Two	0	0	0	0	0	0	0	0	0	0
Swindon Town	2020–21	League One	0	0	0	0	0	0	1 (Note: Appearance(s) in EFL Trophy)	0	1	0
Swindon Town	Total		0	0	0	0	0	0	1	0	1	0
Chippenham Town (loan)	2019–20	National League South	20	1	6	2	—		2 (Note: Appearance(s) in FA Trophy)	0	28	3
Chippenham Town (loan)	2019–20	National League South	5	1	0	0	—		0	0	5	1
Hereford (loan)	2020–21	National League North	4	0	2	0	—		4	0	8	0
Hereford	2021–22	National League North	31	4	0	0	—		1	0	32	4
Hereford	2022–23	National League North	29	3	2	0	—		1	0	32	3
Hereford	Total		60	7	2	0	—		2	0	64	7
Chippenham Town	2023–24	National League South	30	1	1	0	—		3	1	34	2
Chippenham Town	2024–25	National League South	37	3	3	0	—		1	0	41	3
Chippenham Town	Total		67	4	4	0	—		4	1	75	5
Career total			156	13	14	2	0	0	13	1	181	16
