= Tom Owen-Evans =

English association football player (born 1997)

Personal information
- Full name: Thomas George Owen-Evans
- Date of birth: 18 March 1997 (age 29)
- Place of birth: Bristol, England
- Height: 1.80 m (5 ft 11 in)
- Position: Midfielder

Team information
- Current team: Gloucester City

Youth career
- –2014: Newport County

Senior career*
Years	Team	Apps	(Gls)
2014–2018	Newport County	52	(1)
2016	→ Gloucester City (loan)	3	(1)
2018	→ Truro City (loan)	4	(2)
2018	Falkirk	2	(0)
2018–2022	Hereford	104	(31)
2019–2020	→ Chippenham Town (loan)	8	(2)
2022–2023	Kidderminster Harriers	24	(1)
2023–2026	Chippenham Town	86	(12)
2026–	Gloucester City	0	(0)
- * Club domestic league appearances and goals as of 12:39, 29 May 2026 (UTC)

Thomas George Owen-Evans (born 18 March 1997) is an English footballer who plays as a midfielder for Southern League Premier Division South club Gloucester City.

== Early life ==
Born in Bristol, Owen-Evans was raised in the Forest of Dean. He is childhood friends with fellow Newport academy graduate Kieran Parselle having attended the same school, Gordano School in Bristol.

== Career ==
=== Newport County ===
Owen-Evans is a product of the Newport County Academy. In the 2014–15 season he was an unused substitute in a number of League Two matches under managers Justin Edinburgh and Jimmy Dack. He made his Football League debut for Newport County under Dack aged 18 on 25 April 2015 as a second-half substitute in a League Two match versus York City. Newport won the match 2–0. He signed his first senior contract with Newport a month later in May 2015.

Owen-Evans started the 2015–16 season by coming off the bench in County's 3–0 away loss to Cambridge United.

On 23 September 2016, Owen-Evans joined Gloucester City on loan until 1 January 2017, as cover for injured midfielder Chris Knowles. A clerical error during his signing almost resulted in him missing his first match, having signed incorrect contract papers forcing him to return to Newport to complete the move. Despite this, he made his debut for the club during a 3–1 defeat to Harrogate Town. He was recalled by Newport on 7 November 2016. He scored his first goal for Newport on 10 December 2016 in a League Two match against Morecambe but the match was abandoned at half-time due to a waterlogged pitch with Newport leading 1–0 so the goal was struck from the records. Owen-Evans scored his first recorded goal in a 1–0 League Two win against Exeter City on 8 April 2017. Owen-Evans was part of the Newport squad that completed the 'Great Escape' with a 2–1 victory at home to Notts County on the final day of the 2016–17 season, which ensured Newport's survival in League Two. On 11 May 2017 Owen-Evans signed a new two-year contract with Newport County.

On 28 February 2018 Owen-Evans joined Truro City on loan until the end of the 2017–18 season.

Owen-Evans moved to Scottish Championship club Falkirk in June 2018. He agreed mutual termination of his contract on 24 October 2018.

=== Hereford ===
On 26 October 2018, Owen-Evans signed for National League North club Hereford. He signed an 18-month contract with Hereford in January 2019. On 10 December 2019, he joined National League South club Chippenham Town on an initial one-month loan, which was extended until the end of the season although Hereford recalled him in January 2020.

Owen-Evans featured in the 2021 FA Trophy final at Wembley Stadium against Hornchurch, scoring the opening goal of the match in the 13th minute before Hereford went on to lose 3–1. He extended his stay at Hereford for a further season on 28 May 2021.

Whilst with Hereford, Owen-Evans was the club's top goalscorer across all competitions in the 2018–19 and 2021–22 seasons with 11 and 15 goals respectively, whilst also picking up the Player of the Season award for 2018–19.

=== Kidderminster Harriers ===
On 27 May 2022, Owen-Evans signed for National League North club Kidderminster Harriers on a one-year deal. It was announced on 18 May 2023, after Harriers had won the play-offs and promotion to the National League, that Owen-Evans was to be released after one season with the club.

=== Chippenham Town ===
On 23 May 2023, it was announced that Owen-Evans had joined National League South club Chippenham Town, a club he previously played for on loan whilst with Hereford. Owen-Evans himself announced on Twitter on 27 September, that he had fractured his fibula. He made his second debut for the club on 18 November, in an FA Trophy fixture at home against Basingstoke Town, where he played the first half before being substituted at half-time.

=== Gloucester City ===
In May 2026, Owen-Evans returned to Southern League Premier Division South club Gloucester City.

== Career statistics ==
As of match played 1 January 2025

Appearances and goals by club, season and competition
Club	Season	League			National cup (Note: Includes FA Cup, Scottish Cup)		League cup (Note: Includes EFL Cup, Scottish League Cup)		Other		Total	
Club	Season	Division	Apps	Goals	Apps	Goals	Apps	Goals	Apps	Goals	Apps	Goals
Newport County	2014–15	League Two	1	0	0	0	0	0	0	0	1	0
Newport County	2015–16	League Two	15	0	2	0	1	0	1 (Note: Appearance(s) in EFL Trophy)	0	19	0
Newport County	2016–17	League Two	24	1	0	0	0	0	2	0	26	1
Newport County	2017–18	League Two	8	0	0	0	1	0	2	0	11	0
Newport County	Total		48	1	2	0	2	0	5	0	57	1
Gloucester City (loan)	2016–17	National League South	3	1	0	0	—		0	0	3	1
Truro City (loan)	2017–18	National League South	13	3	0	0	—		0	0	13	3
Falkirk	2018–19	Scottish Championship	2	0	0	0	4	0	1 (Note: Appearance(s) in Scottish Challenge Cup)	0	7	0
Hereford	2018–19	National League North	29	10	0	0	—		3 (Note: Appearance(s) in FA Trophy)	1	32	11
Hereford	2019–20	National League North	23	4	3	0	—		2	0	28	4
Hereford	2020–21	National League North	12	4	2	2	—		7	3	21	9
Hereford	2021–22	National League North	40	13	4	2	—		1	0	45	15
Hereford	Total		104	31	9	4	—		13	4	126	39
Chippenham Town (loan)	2019–20	National League South	8	2	0	0	—		0	0	8	2
Kidderminster Harriers	2022–23	National League North	24	1	0	0	—		3	0	27	1
Chippenham Town	2023–24	National League South	19	3	0	0	—		4 (Note: Three appearances, one goal in FA Trophy; one appearance in Wiltshire Premier Shield)	1	23	4
Chippenham Town	2024–25	National League South	21	4	3	0	—		1	0	25	4
Chippenham Town	Total		40	7	3	0	—		5	1	48	8
Total			242	46	14	4	6	0	27	5	289	55
