= Elisha Sam =

Belgian footballer

Personal information
- Full name: Elisha Bruce Sam
- Date of birth: 31 March 1997 (age 29)
- Place of birth: Antwerp, Belgium
- Height: 1.95 m (6 ft 5 in)
- Position: Forward

Team information
- Current team: Becamex Ho Chi Minh City
- Number: 19

Youth career
- 2003–2007: Vlug Vooruit
- 2007–2014: Lierse
- 2014–2019: Standard Liège

Senior career*
Years	Team	Apps	(Gls)
2017–2018	Hapoel Acre	7	(0)
2018	→ Hapoel Nazareth Illit (loan)	15	(1)
2018–2019	FC Eindhoven	33	(8)
2019–2020	Arda Kardzhali	16	(3)
2020–2022	Notts County	49	(9)
2022–2024	Patro Eisden	47	(17)
2024–2026	Enosis Neon Paralimni	15	(2)
2026	Becamex Ho Chi Minh City	7	(0)
- * Club domestic league appearances and goals as of 25 June 2025

Elisha Bruce Sam (born 31 March 1997) is a Belgian professional footballer who plays as a forward for Vietnamese club Becamex Ho Chi Minh City.

== Career ==
Elisha made his Israeli Premier League debut for Hapoel Acre on 20 August 2017 in a game against Bnei Sakhnin as a 71st-minute substitute for Fejsal Mulić.

On 31 August 2018, he moved to the Netherlands, signing a one-year contract with FC Eindhoven, with the club holding a one-year extension option.

On 26 June 2019, he signed a contract with the newly promoted to the Bulgarian First League team Arda Kardzhali. On 27 July, he scored two goals in a 3–1 home victory over Beroe, contributing to the historic first win for the team from Kardzhali in the top division of Bulgarian football.

On 31 August 2020, he signed for English National League side Notts County. Sam scored his first goal for the club in a 1–1 draw at FC Halifax Town on 17 November 2020, before scoring again against Wealdstone in a 3–0 win 10 days later. On 27 February 2021, Sam scored a stunning back-heel volley in the club's FA Trophy quarter-final win over Oxford City, with many pundits already calling it the Puskás Award winner for the year. Sam was awarded the National League Player of the Month award for February 2022, scoring four goals across the month. On 1 June 2022, Sam had his contract terminated by mutual consent.

On 23 June, Elisha signed a contract with the Belgian team Patro Eisden Maasmechelen, which plays in the Belgian National Division 1.

== Personal life ==
His two-year younger brother Ephraim Sam played in the youth of K.A.A. Gent, Merksemse Vlug Vooruit and Lierse S.K., as well as senior by Olympic Pirates Deurne Borgerhout and KVC Oostmalle Sport. Their father hails from Ghana, while their mother is from Belgium.

== Career statistics ==
As of match played 12 December 2022

Appearances and goals by club, season and competition
Club	Season	League			National Cup (Note: Includes appearances in Bulgarian Cup, FA Cup)		League Cup (Note: Includes appearances in Toto Cup)		Other		Total	
Club	Season	Division	Apps	Goals	Apps	Goals	Apps	Goals	Apps	Goals	Apps	Goals
Hapoel Acre	2017–18	Israeli Premier League	7	0	0	0	5	1	—		12	1
Hapoel Nof HaGalil (loan)	2017–18	Liga Leumit	15	1	—		—		—		15	1
FC Eindhoven	2018–19	Eerste Divisie	33	8	0	0	—		—		33	8
Arda Kardzhali	2019–20	Bulgarian First League	18	3	1	0	—		—		19	3
Notts County	2020–21	National League	26	3	0	0	—		6 (Note: Five appearances in 2020–21 FA Trophy, one appearance in 2019–20 FA Trophy)	4	32	7
Notts County	2021–22	National League	23	6	2	0	—		2 (Note: Appearances in FA Trophy)	2	27	8
Notts County	Total		49	9	2	0	—		8	6	59	15
Patro Eisden Maasmechelen	2022–23	Belgian National Division 1	16	9	2	2	—		—		18	11
Career total			138	30	5	2	5	1	8	6	156	39
