= Ollie Muldoon =

English footballer (born 1994)

Personal information
- Full name: Oliver James Muldoon
- Date of birth: 3 September 1994 (age 32)
- Place of birth: Hornchurch, England
- Height: 6 ft 0 in (1.83 m)
- Position: Central midfielder

Team information
- Current team: Aveley (dual-registration from Hornchurch)

Youth career
- –2013: Charlton Athletic

Senior career*
Years	Team	Apps	(Gls)
2013–2017	Charlton Athletic	0	(0)
2015	→ Gillingham (loan)	3	(0)
2016	→ Dagenham & Redbridge (loan)	18	(0)
2016	→ Braintree Town (loan)	10	(2)
2017	Gillingham	4	(0)
2017–2019	Maidstone United	36	(0)
2019–2020	Chelmsford City	19	(1)
2020–	Hornchurch	122	(8)
2025–	→ Aveley (dual-registration)	0	(0)
- * Club domestic league appearances and goals as of 13:03, 30 September 2025 (UTC)

Oliver James Muldoon (born 3 September 1994) is an English professional footballer who plays as a central midfielder for Aveley on dual-registration from Hornchurch.

== Early life ==
Muldoon was born in Hornchurch, Havering.

== Club career ==
A Charlton Athletic youth graduate, Muldoon signed a new contract with the club on 6 December 2013, running until the end of the 2013–14 season. He was an unused substitute for the matches against Blackburn Rovers and Brighton & Hove Albion in January 2015.

On 11 March 2015, Muldoon agreed a new contract with Charlton, signing until 2017 and being immediately loaned to Gillingham until the end of the season. He made his first-team debut three days later, starting in a 0–0 away draw against Bristol City in League One.

In January 2016, he signed for League Two club Dagenham & Redbridge on loan until the end of the season.

Muldoon was released by Charlton on 1 February 2017. He rejoined Gillingham on 21 February for the remainder of the 2016–17 season, but was released by the club at the end of the season after just four appearances.

On 29 September 2017, Muldoon joined Maidstone United on a contract until the end of the 2017–18 season.

On 18 June 2019, Muldoon signed for Chelmsford City.

On 23 October 2020, Muldoon signed for hometown club Hornchurch.

In September 2025, Muldoon joined Isthmian League Premier Division club Aveley on dual-registration.

== Career statistics ==
As of end of 2024–25 season

Appearances and goals by club, season and competition
Club	Season	League			FA Cup		League Cup		Other		Total	
Club	Season	Division	Apps	Goals	Apps	Goals	Apps	Goals	Apps	Goals	Apps	Goals
Charlton Athletic	2014–15	Championship	0	0	0	0	0	0	—		0	0
Charlton Athletic	2015–16	Championship	0	0	—		1	0	—		1	0
Charlton Athletic	2016–17	League One	0	0	—		0	0	0	0	0	0
Charlton Athletic	Charlton Athletic total		0	0	0	0	1	0	0	0	1	0
Gillingham (loan)	2014–15	League One	3	0	—		—		—		3	0
Dagenham & Redbridge (loan)	2015–16	League Two	18	0	1	0	—		—		19	0
Braintree Town (loan)	2016–17	National League	10	2	1	1	—		—		11	3
Gillingham	2016–17	League One	4	0	—		—		—		4	0
Maidstone United	2017–18	National League	5	0	2	0	—		0	0	7	0
Maidstone United	2018–19	National League	31	0	2	0	—		2 (Note: Appearances in FA Trophy)	0	35	0
Maidstone United	Maidstone United total		36	0	4	0	—		2	0	42	0
Chelmsford City	2019–20	National League South	18	1	0	0	—		2 (Note: One appearance in FA Trophy and one appearance Essex Senior Cup)	0	20	1
Chelmsford City	2020–21	National League South	1	0	0	0	—		0	0	1	0
Chelmsford City	Chelmsford City total		19	1	0	0	—		2	0	21	1
Hornchurch	2020–21	Isthmian League Premier Division	2	0	0	0	—		8 (Note: Appearance(s) in FA Trophy)	1	10	1
Hornchurch	2021–22	Isthmian League Premier Division	36	3	5	1	—		4 (Note: One appearance in Pitching In Super Cup, one appearance in FA Trophy, two appearances in Isthmian League Premier Division play-offs)	0	45	4
Hornchurch	2022–23	Isthmian League Premier Division	26	0	3	0	—		3 (Note: One appearance and one goal in FA Trophy, two appearances in Essex Senior Cup)	1	32	1
Hornchurch	2023–24	Isthmian League Premier Division	33	5	1	0	—		1	0	35	5
Hornchurch	2024–25	National League South	23	0	0	0	—		2 (Note: Appearance(s) in Essex Senior Cup)	0	25	0
Hornchurch	Total		120	8	9	1	0	0	18	2	147	11
Career total			200	11	15	2	1	0	22	2	258	15

== Honours ==
Hornchurch

- Isthmian League Premier Division: 2023–24
- FA Trophy: 2020–21
