= Lewwis Spence =

English footballer (born 1987)

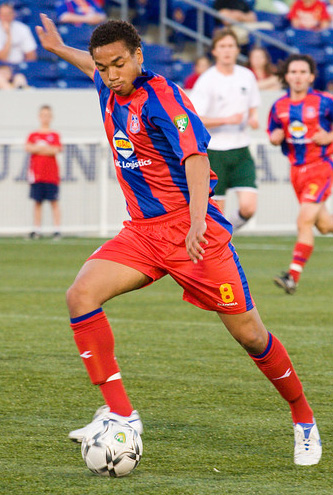

Personal information
- Full name: Lewwis Gavin Spence
- Date of birth: 29 October 1987 (age 38)
- Place of birth: Lambeth, London, England
- Position: Midfielder

Team information
- Current team: Waltham Abbey

Youth career
- 2004–2006: Crystal Palace

Senior career*
| Years | Team | Apps | (Gls) |
| 2006–2008 | Crystal Palace | 2 | (0) |
| 2007 | → Crystal Palace Baltimore (loan) | 3 | (0) |
| 2008–2010 | Wycombe Wanderers | 30 | (2) |
| 2009 | → Forest Green Rovers (loan) | 7 | (0) |
| 2010–2012 | Rushden & Diamonds | 15 | (0) |
| 2011 | → Dover Athletic (loan) | | |
| 2011 | Dover Athletic | 21 | (3) |
| 2012–2013 | Bishops Stortford | | |
| 2013–2016 | Thurrock | | |
| 2016–2017 | Greenwich Borough | | |
| 2017–2018 | Thurrock | | |
| 2018–2024 | Hornchurch | 158 | (27) |
| 2024– | Waltham Abbey | 9 | (5) |

Managerial career
- 2024: Hornchurch (interim)
- * Club domestic league appearances and goals as of 09:27, 2 March 2025 (UTC)

Lewwis Gavin Spence (born 29 October 1987) is an English footballer who plays for Waltham Abbey.

== Career ==
Spence was a regular for both Crystal Palace's Reserve and under-18 teams, and made his debut for the first team in a Football League Cup match against Notts County in August 2006. His progression continued as he made his league debut at Elland Road against Leeds United, on 11 February 2007, and then made his first start for the club on 3 March, against Burnley at Turf Moor.

On 18 April, Spence flew out to America with fellow youngster Charlie Sheringham to join Crystal Palace's feeder club Crystal Palace Baltimore on loan for four months, though this spell was cut short by injury.

On 16 June 2008, he joined Wycombe Wanderers on a two-year deal from Palace, linking up with Peter Taylor again, after the latter's departure from Selhurst Park eight months before. He scored on his debut in a 1–1 draw with Morecambe.

In the summer of 2009, Spence suffered a foot injury that kept him out of action for pre season. To regain match fitness he was loaned to Conference National outfit Forest Green Rovers in September 2009, on a month-long deal. He was released from Wycombe at the end of the 2009–10 season, and joined Rushden & Diamonds.

Spence left Rushden and Diamonds in March 2011 after a loan spell at Dover Athletic. After a further brief spell at Dover and time at Bishop's Stortford, he joined Thurrock in February 2013.

Before the start of the 2016–17 season, Spence signed for south London side Greenwich Borough, before returning to Thurrock for 2017–18. Spence scored the last Thurrock goal at Ship Lane on 21 April 2018 and finished their final ever season as top scorer with 12 goals and captain.

In June 2018, Spence joined newly promoted Isthmian League Premier side AFC Hornchurch, making his debut away at Brightlingsea Regent in August. Spence captained the Hornchurch side that won the 2021 FA Trophy final, subsequently being named as interim manager at the beginning of 2024, following the departure of Steve Morison to Sutton United.

In December 2025, Spence signed for Isthmian League North Division side Waltham Abbey.

== Personal life ==
His sister Drew plays as a midfielder for Tottenham Hotspur and the Jamaican national team.

== Honours ==
Hornchurch

- FA Trophy: 2020–21
