= Steve Burr =

Scottish footballer (born 1963)

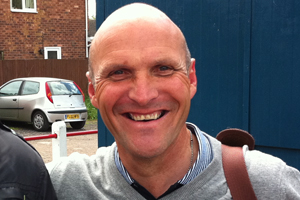
- Burr in 2011

Personal information
- Date of birth: 12 January 1960 (age 66)
- Position: Striker

Team information
- Current team: 1874 Northwich (assistant manager)

Senior career*
Years	Team	Apps	(Gls)
1981–1984	Stafford Rangers	114	(37)
1984–1991	Macclesfield Town	248	(134)
1991–1993	Hednesford Town		
1993	Stafford Rangers		
1993–1994	Halifax Town	8	(0)
1994–1995	Hednesford Town		
1995–1996	Macclesfield Town	3	(2)
1996	Winsford United		
1996–1998	Nuneaton Borough	6	(2)

Managerial career
- 2000–2003: Nuneaton Borough
- 2003–2004: Hucknall Town
- 2004–2007: Northwich Victoria
- 2005–: England C (assistant)
- 2007–2010: Stalybridge Celtic
- 2010–2014: Kidderminster Harriers
- 2014–2016: Chester
- 2016–2017: Southport
- 2017–2018: Stalybridge Celtic
- 2018: Stafford Rangers
- 2020–2022: Hereford (assistant)
- 2022: Hednesford Town
- 2024–: 1874 Northwich (assistant)
- * Club domestic league appearances and goals

Steve Burr (born 12 January 1960) is a Scottish football manager and former player who is the assistant manager at 1874 Northwich who play in the Northern Premier League Division One West

== Playing career ==
Steve Burr began his football career as a player with Stafford Rangers but it was with a summer 1984 move to Macclesfield Town that he really started to make a name for himself. He was the Silkmen's leading goal scorer as they finished runners-up to Rangers in the Northern Premier League Premier Division, and also scored their first ever goal in the Football Conference after helping them to promotion up to non-league's top tier.

Burr is still highly thought of at Macclesfield, where he was part of one of their most successful periods as a club. His spell went on to include two FA Trophy Final appearances. In 1990 Alex Ferguson, brought a Manchester United team to Moss Rose to celebrate Burr's testimonial year.

== Managerial career ==
=== Nuneaton Borough and Hucknall Town ===
Burr began his managerial career at Nuneaton Borough, where he was originally assistant to Brendan Phillips before taking over as manager when Phillips was sacked in 2000. He left Nuneaton after their relegation from the Football Conference at the end of the 2002–03 season, and moved on to become manager of Hucknall Town. He achieved virtually instant success, cruising to the Northern Premier League Premier Division title in his sole season at the club in 2003–04.

=== Northwich Victoria ===
The lure of management higher up the pyramid took Burr into the Conference with Northwich Victoria at that stage, and once again he made a serious impact - although this time on a different scale. Almost immediately, he was dealt a huge blow with a ten-point deduction, which threatened the Vics' survival. Against all odds, the side achieved what was considered the impossible by battling to survival on the pitch - only for 'non football' issues to heartbreakingly see them relegated once again.

That would have been enough of a hammer blow to anyone's managerial career and progress, but Burr hardly let the demotion affect him, as he swiftly led Northwich straight back to the Conference by winning the Conference North Championship. Along the way, he took his side to the Third Round of the FA Cup and a dream date with Premier League side Sunderland A.F.C, and was voted Manager of the Season. The season had begun well with Alex Ferguson yet again playing a part in Burr's career by bringing a Manchester United side to Northwich to celebrate the opening of their new ground, the Victoria Stadium.

As Northwich found themselves submerged with off-field problems, Burr still managed to work wonders with Northwich in the Conference in 2006/07 - leading them to a safe, mid-table position as well as leading them to the FA Trophy semi-final - a run that was ended by Kidderminster Harriers who went on to the final, the first to be played at the newly refurbished Wembley Stadium.

=== England C ===
In November 2005, Burr was appointed assistant manager to Paul Fairclough as part of the England C managerial team. His first game resulted in a 2–0 victory over Belgium. From 2006, under Fairclough's and Burr's guidance, England C recorded 19 wins, 7 draws and suffered 4 defeats.

=== Stalybridge Celtic ===
Burr finally left troubled Vics that summer and became manager of Stalybridge Celtic.

Burr took his new side all the way to the Conference North play-off Final in 2008, only to be beaten by a single goal as Barrow went on to claim promotion to the Conference National.

=== Kidderminster Harriers ===
His appointment as Kidderminster Harriers manager on a 2 1/2-year contract in January 2010 saw him once again have the opportunity to have a crack at management in the Conference National. He had a magnificent start at Aggborough with a 4-1 thrashing of Grays Athletic on his home début. This was the first game of an 8-game unbeaten streak as his side made an unlikely bid for the play-offs and progressed to the semi-finals of the FA Trophy. This earned him the division's Manager of the Month title for February 2010 but this was to be the last accolade of the season for Burr and the Harriers as they went out of the FA Trophy to eventual finalists and Conference champions, Stevenage Borough, and a drop in form saw them finish 13th in the league.

In March 2011 Kidderminster refused fellow Conference side Grimsby Town permission to talk to Burr about the possibility of him becoming the next Mariners manager. Burr followed this up by stating that he was happy to stay at Kidderminster. This was clarified when Burr and assistant Gary Whild both signed contract extensions to the end of the 2013–14 season. The Harriers went on to finish sixth in the Conference, one place outside the play-offs, after slipping to defeats late in the season at home to Darlington and away to Rushden & Diamonds and suffering a points deduction after financial problems off the field.

In 2013, Burr received the Conference Premier Manager of the Month award for February after steering his side to five straight wins in five matches. Kidderminster conceded just three goals in the month and found the net no less than 12 times. The award was Burr's second of the season having previously been named the Manager of the Month for December 2012. February's award was the culmination of a run 15 wins in 17 league games.

After a thrilling last day of the season that saw Kiddy miss out on automatic promotion by two points the club failed to get past Wrexham in the Play-offs. Despite this Burr was named the Conference Premier Manager of the Season after recording a better away record than title-winning manager Mansfield's Paul Cox.

On 1 November 2013, it was announced that Steve had been given permission to speak with Forest Green Rovers in relation to the vacant managerial role at that club. He turned down the offer, and elected to stay at the Harriers.

On 7 January 2014, it became public knowledge that Steve Burr had been removed from his post as manager of Kidderminster Harriers. Just two days later the club announced he was to be replaced by Andy Thorn formerly manager of Coventry City.

=== Chester ===
On 18 January 2014, Chester F.C. announced Burr as their new full-time manager until the end of the season with an option to extend the deal into the following season.

Burr was sacked by Chester F.C. on 7 April 2016.

=== Southport ===
Burr was announced as the new manager of Southport on 8 September 2016. A club statement on 30 January 2017 stated that Burr had been relieved of his duties.

=== Stalybridge Celtic and Stafford Rangers ===
In February 2017, Burr took over at Stalybridge Celtic before moving on to Stafford Rangers 15 months later. He resigned from the post in December 2018.

=== At Fleetwood Town as a scout ===
In July, 2019, Burr was appointed as Fleetwood's Senior Club Scout. At the time he said: "I have followed the non-league scene for a very long time now and for me, this was the right moment for me to step into this new role. I have come up against Fleetwood Town before, and it's unbelievable where they have come from in such a short space of time.

"After speaking to Chairman Andy Pilley, CEO Steve Curwood, and a number of other staff, it helped me make my mind up. This is a fantastic club and I am looking forward to getting started.

He added: "Everybody is looking for that next Jamie Vardy after that success story."

=== Hereford ===
On 24 January 2020, Burr was announced as the interim assistant manager of National League North team Hereford following the appointment of Josh Gowling. Gowling played under Burr at Kidderminster Harriers.

On 12 June 2020, Burr was confirmed as Hereford's permanent assistant manager under Gowling.

=== Hednesford Town ===
On 12 September 2022, Burr left Hereford to return to first-team management with Hednesford Town. After just three months in charge, and with the club level on points at the bottom of the Southern League Premier Central, he was sacked by the Pitmen on 12 December 2022.

=== 1874 Northwich ===
On 25 May 2024, Burr was appointed assistant manager at 1874 Northwich reuniting with Chris Herbert who he had worked with at Chester F.C. previously.

== Managerial statistics ==
As of match played 8 January 2024

Managerial record by team and tenure
Team	From	To	Record					Ref
Team	From	To	P	W	D	L	Win %	Ref
Stalybridge Celtic	30 May 2007	21 January 2010	125	64	21	40	51.2	
Kidderminster Harriers	21 January 2010	7 January 2014	205	96	51	58	46.8	
Chester	18 January 2014	7 April 2016	125	45	26	54	36.0	
Southport	8 September 2016	30 January 2017	28	10	6	12	35.7	
Stalybridge Celtic	8 February 2017	1 May 2018	73	24	9	40	32.9	
Stafford Rangers	3 May 2018	28 December 2018	31	9	8	14	29.0	
Hednesford Town	12 September 2022	12 December 2022	16	3	5	8	18.8	
Total			603	251	126	226	41.6	
