= 2020–21 FA Trophy =

Football Association Trophy

Tournament details
- Country: England; Wales
- Dates: Qualifying rounds: 26 September 2020 – 31 October 2020; Competition Proper: 14 November 2020 – 22 May 2021
- Teams: Qualifying: 226; Competition proper: 67 + (74 from Qualifying); Total teams: 293

Final positions
- Champions: Hornchurch (1st title)
- Runners-up: Hereford

Tournament statistics
- Top goal scorer: Liam Nash (5 goals)

The 2020–21 FA Trophy (known for sponsorship reasons as the Buildbase FA Trophy) was the 52nd season of the FA Trophy, an annual football competition for teams at levels 5-8 of the English National League System. In a change in format from previous years, the competition consisted of three qualifying rounds, and seven proper rounds. Teams from level 8 entered into the first and second qualifying rounds, level 7 into the third qualifying round, level 6 (the National League North and National League South) into round 2, and level 5 (the National League) into round 3.

All matches were in a single-match knockout format, with the winner decided by penalties if the match was drawn after 90 minutes, apart from the Final where the winner was decided by extra-time and penalties if the match was drawn. This was a change from previous seasons where replays were used and where the semi-finals were scheduled as two-legged; the changes reflected the late start of the season due to the COVID-19 pandemic in the United Kingdom. The final was a single-match held at Wembley Stadium.

== Calendar ==
The calendar for the 2020-21 Buildbase FA Trophy, as announced by The Football Association.

Round	Main Date	Number of Fixtures	Clubs Remaining	New Entries This Round	Losing Club	Winning Club
First round qualifying	26 September 2020	17	293 → 276	34	£450	£1,500
Second round qualifying	17 October 2020	61	276 → 215	105	£575	£2,250
Third round qualifying	31 October 2020	74	215 → 141	87	£625	£2,450
First round proper	8 December 2020	37	141 → 104	0	£775	£3,000
Second round proper	15 December 2020	40	104 → 64	43	£1,000	£3,750
Third round proper	19 December 2020	32	64 → 32	24	£1,250	£4,500
Fourth round proper	16 January 2021	16	32 → 16	0	£1,500	£5,250
Fifth round proper	6 February 2021	8	16 → 8	0	£1,750	£6,000
Quarter-finals	27 February 2021	4	8 → 4	0	£2,000	£7,500
Semi-finals	27 March 2021	2	4 → 2	0	£5,000	£15,000
Final	8 May 2021	1	2 → 1	0	£30,000	£60,000

== First round qualifying ==
The draw was made on 18 August 2020. All results taken from The Football Association website.

Tie	Home team (tier)	Score	Away team (tier)	Att.
Saturday 26 September 2020
1	Tadcaster Albion (8)	1–3	Marine (8)	221
2	Ossett United (8)	0–2	Ramsbottom United (8)	346
3	Market Drayton Town (8)	0–1	Bury Town (8)	78
4	Cambridge City (8)	2–3	Kidsgrove Athletic (8)	212
5	Soham Town Rangers (8)	0–3	Corby Town (8)	131
6	Evesham United (8)	2–1	Biggleswade (8)	271
7	South Park (8)	0–1	Three Bridges (8)	111
8	Waltham Abbey (8)	3–2	Staines Town (8)	100

Tie	Home team (tier)	Score	Away team (tier)	Att.
9	Hullbridge Sports (8)	0–1	Ashford Town (8)	
10	Hythe Town (8)	3–0	Chalfont St Peter (8)	178
11	AFC Sudbury (8)	1–2	Barking (8)	178
12	Felixstowe & Walton United (8)	2–1	Great Wakering Rovers (8)	202
13	Northwood (8)	1–1 (4–3 p)	Basildon United (8)	111
14	AFC Dunstable (8)	1–2	Tooting & Mitcham United (8)	97
15	Witham Town (8)	0–2	Hanwell Town (8)	104
16	Melksham Town (8)	3–3 (4–5 p)	North Leigh (8)	259
17	Cirencester Town (8)	1–1 (5–4 p)	Paulton Rovers (8)	100

== Second round qualifying ==
The draw was made on 18 August 2020.

Tie	Home team (tier)	Score	Away team (tier)	Att.
Saturday 17 October 2020
1	Pontefract Collieries (8)	1–4	Workington (8)	191
2	Prescot Cables (8)	W/O	Frickley Athletic (8)	
Frickley Athletic awarded a walkover due to a Prescot Cables player testing positive for COVID-19, forcing them to forfeit.
3	Worksop Town (8)	4–4 (5–4 p)	Ramsbottom United (8)	298
4	Pickering Town (8)	1–0	Trafford (8)	124
5	Kendal Town (8)	1–0	Brighouse Town (8)	210
Kendal Town removed from competition for fielding two ineligible players.
6	Marine (8)	5–0	Mossley (8)	260
7	Widnes (8)	3–4	Colne (8)	0
8	Sheffield (8)	2–3	Runcorn Linnets (8)	281
9	Dunston (8)	0–1	Clitheroe (8)	212
10	Stocksbridge Park Steels (8)	0–4	Marske United (8)	230
11	City of Liverpool (8)	W/O	Cleethorpes Town (8)	
City of Liverpool awarded a walkover due to Cleethorpes Town refusing to travel to a Tier 3 area.
12	Droylsden (8)	W/O	Glossop North End (8)	
Glossop North End awarded a walkover due to Droylsden withdrawing from competition.
13	Sutton Coldfield Town (8)	2–3	Dereham Town (8)	283
14	Newcastle Town (8)	2–2 (5–4 p)	Belper Town (8)	214
15	Yaxley (8)	W/O	Chasetown (8)	
Yaxley awarded a walkover due to a Chasetown player testing positive for COVID-19, forcing them to forfeit.
16	Corby Town (8)	1–0	Halesowen Town (8)	400
17	Daventry Town (8)	0–2	Kidsgrove Athletic (8)	95
18	Ilkeston Town (8)	2–1	Kempston Rovers (8)	370
19	Evesham United (8)	2–0	Carlton Town (8)	269
20	Histon (8)	1–2	Leek Town (8)	226
21	Loughborough Dynamo (8)	1–0	Bury Town (8)	120
22	Spalding United (8)	0–1	Bedford Town (8)	224
23	Wisbech Town (8)	1–2	Coleshill Town (8)	164
24	Stamford (8)	2–1	Lincoln United (8)	288
25	Bedworth United (8)	1–4	St Neots Town (8)	154
26	Hastings United (8)	3–0	FC Romania (8)	377
27	Northwood (8)	3–3 (4–5 p)	Heybridge Swifts (8)	151
28	Sittingbourne (8)	1–0	East Grinstead Town (8)	175

Tie	Home team (tier)	Score	Away team (tier)	Att.
29	Felixstowe & Walton United (8)	5–0	Westfield (8)	266
30	Phoenix Sports (8)	0–2	Marlow (8)	63
31	Ashford Town (8)	1–0	Whitstable Town (8)	163
32	VCD Athletic (8)	1–2	Herne Bay (8)	128
33	Faversham Town (8)	4–1	Hertford Town (8)	212
34	Barking (8)	1–0	Harlow Town (8)	107
35	Tooting & Mitcham United (8)	2–0	Romford (8)	400
36	Chertsey Town (8)	1–2	Berkhamsted (8)	340
37	Whitehawk (8)	2–1	Barton Rovers (8)	400
38	Ramsgate (8)	W/O	Canvey Island (8)	
Ramsgate awarded a walkover due to Canvey Island players experiencing COVID-19 symptoms, forcing them to forfeit.
39	Bedfont Sports (8)	0–0 (5–6 p)	Coggeshall Town (8)	92
40	Whyteleafe (8)	0–0 (3–2 p)	Cray Valley PM (8)	227
41	Maldon & Tiptree (8)	4–1	Grays Athletic (8)	319
42	Brentwood Town (8)	3–2	Chicester City (8)	301
43	Chipstead (8)	1–2	Three Bridges (8)	132
44	Uxbridge (8)	2–1	Waltham Abbey (8)	137
45	Aylesbury United (8)	2–2 (4–2 p)	Tilbury (8)	197
46	Bracknell Town (8)	2–0	Sevenoaks Town (8)	204
47	Hythe Town (8)	2–2 (7–6 p)	Ashford United (8)	388
48	Burgess Hill Town (8)	2–0	Ware (8)	250
49	Haywards Heath Town (8)	1–4	Welwyn Garden City (8)	163
50	Hanwell Town (8)	1–1 (7–8 p)	Aveley (8)	201
51	Thame United (8)	4–1	Cirencester Town (8)	160
52	Thatcham Town (8)	2–4	North Leigh (8)	186
53	A.F.C. Totton (8)	2–2 (5–6 p)	Frome Town (8)	252
54	Sholing (8)	0–2	Wantage Town (8)	174
55	Bideford (8)	3–2	Slimbridge (8)	200
56	Moneyfields (8)	2–1	Basingstoke Town (8)	198
57	Highworth Town (8)	2–1	Winchester City (8)	124
58	Larkhall Athletic (8)	5–0	Barnstaple Town (8)	120
59	Kidlington (8)	2–1	Didcot Town (8)	170
60	Willand Rovers (8)	2–1	Bristol Manor Farm (8)	157
61	Mangotsfield United (8)	1–2	Cinderford Town (8)	154

== Third round qualifying ==
The draw was made on 19 October 2020. Due to the withdrawal of Merthyr Town from the competition, there was an odd number of teams competing in this round. As a result, Willand Rovers were drawn to receive a bye to the first round proper.

Tie	Home team (tier)	Score	Away team (tier)	Att.
Friday 30 October 2020
69	Wantage Town (8)	1–4	North Leigh (8)	398
Saturday 31 October 2020
1	FC United of Manchester (7)	2–3	Marske United (8)	600
2	Atherton Collieries (7)	P–P	City of Liverpool (8)	
3	Hyde United (7)	2–1	Frickley Athletic (8)	273
4	Warrington Town (7)	1–1 (4–3 p)	Lancaster City (7)	406
5	Brighouse Town (8)	0–2	Buxton (7)	276
6	Ashton United (7)	1–0	Clitheroe (8)	253
7	Radcliffe (7)	1–2	Bamber Bridge (7)	447
8	Scarborough Athletic (7)	W/O	Witton Albion (7)	
Witton Albion awarded a walkover due to two Scarborough Athletic players testing positive for COVID-19, forcing them to forfeit.
9	Pickering Town (8)	1–4	Runcorn Linnets (8)	166
10	Marine (8)	3–2	Stalybridge Celtic (7)	400
11	Glossop North End (8)	0–1	Workington (8)	313
12	South Shields (7)	1–0	Colne (8)	300
13	Morpeth Town (7)	3–1	Whitby Town (7)	300
14	Newcastle Town (8)	0–2	Nuneaton Borough (7)	301
15	Evesham United (8)	3–2	Leek Town (8)	271
16	Redditch United (7)	2–3	Nantwich Town (7)	341
17	Tamworth (7)	2–1	Banbury United (7)	355
18	Bromsgrove Sporting (7)	0–1	Coleshill Town (8)	482
19	AFC Rushden & Diamonds (7)	W/O	Ilkeston Town (8)	
AFC Rushden & Diamonds awarded a walkover due to Ilkeston Town refusing to participate in the fixture, forcing them to forfeit.
20	Yaxley (8)	0–2	Grantham Town (7)	119
21	Loughborough Dynamo (8)	1–3	Bedford Town (8)	169
22	Rushall Olympic (7)	4–1	Barwell (7)	308
23	Mickleover Sports (7)	5–0	Dereham Town (8)	203
24	Coalville Town (7)	P–P	Matlock Town (7)	
25	Peterborough Sports (7)	4–2	Gainsborough Trinity (7)	213
26	Stourbridge (7)	0–3	Stamford (8)	572
27	Basford United (7)	2–1	Alvechurch (7)	191
28	Corby Town (8)	1–2	Hednesford Town (7)	391
29	St Neots Town (8)	6–1	Worksop Town (8)	371
30	St Ives Town (7)	1–1 (4–1 p)	Stafford Rangers (7)	156
31	Stratford Town (7)	1–3	Kidsgrove Athletic (8)	198
32	Maldon & Tiptree (8)	3–2	Kingstonian (7)	256
33	Hastings United (8)	1–1 (4–2 p)	Ashford Town (8)	400
34	Leiston (7)	4–4 (4–2 p)	Worthing (7)	160
35	Burgess Hill Town (8)	4–1	Harrow Borough (7)	190
36	Marlow (8)	P–P	Berkhamsted (8)	
37	Needham Market (7)	4–1	Three Bridges (8)	189
38	Bowers & Pitsea (7)	1–3	Hornchurch (7)	260
39	Royston Town (7)	2–0	Hythe Town (8)	290
40	East Thurrock United (7)	3–4	Cheshunt (7)	
41	Faversham Town (8)	1–2	Haringey Borough (7)	228

Tie	Home team (tier)	Score	Away team (tier)	Att.
42	Walton Casuals (7)	2–1	Folkestone Invicta (7)	203
43	Merstham (7)	P–P	Carshalton Athletic (7)	
44	Coggeshall Town (8)	1–1 (0–3 p)	Wingate & Finchley (7)	134
45	Kings Langley (7)	4–1	Brightlingsea Regent (7)	236
46	Lowestoft Town (7)	3–1	Lewes (7)	236
47	Biggleswade Town (7)	1–0	Heybridge Swifts (8)	133
48	Aveley (8)	3–0	Beaconsfield Town (7)	164
49	Uxbridge (8)	P–P	Hayes & Yeading United (7)	
50	Enfield Town (7)	8–1	Ramsgate (8)	415
51	Barking (8)	1–1 (4–3 p)	Sittingbourne (8)	158
52	Bishop's Stortford (7)	P–P	Brentwood Town (8)	
53	Hitchin Town (7)	3–1	Herne Bay (8)	443
54	Bognor Regis Town (7)	2–0	Tooting & Mitcham United (8)	486
55	Whitehawk (8)	0–3	Cray Wanderers (7)	390
57	Leatherhead (7)	3–1	Potters Bar Town (7)	258
58	Chesham United (7)	2–2 (3–2 p)	Whyteleafe (8)	315
59	Horsham (7)	1–1 (3–5 p)	Welwyn Garden City (8)	473
60	Felixstowe & Walton United (8)	3–1	Metropolitan Police (7)	322
61	Corinthian-Casuals (7)	5–4	Hendon (7)	407
62	Frome Town (8)	3–0	Farnborough (7)	253
63	Taunton Town (7)	P–P	Truro City (7)	
64	Bracknell Town (8)	W/O	Cinderford Town (8)	
Bracknell Town awarded a walkover due to Cinderford Town withdrawing due to players having in contact with a person who has tested positive for COVID-19, and with two players experiencing symptoms.
65	Dorchester Town (7)	2–1	Gosport Borough (7)	247
66	Moneyfields (8)	3–2	Kidlington (8)	128
67	Thame United (8)	W/O	Wimborne Town (7)	
Thame United awarded a walkover due to a Wimborne Town player testing positive for COVID-19, forcing them to forfeit.
68	Salisbury (7)	6–0	Tiverton Town (7)	519
70	Hartley Wintney (7)	1–4	Poole Town (7)	255
71	Weston-super-Mare (7)	2–1	Larkhall Athletic (8)	
72	Highworth Town (8)	2–3	Swindon Supermarine (7)	302
73	Yate Town (7)	W/O	Bideford (8)	
Bideford awarded a walkover due to a Yate Town player testing positive for COVID-19, forcing them to forfeit.
	Willand Rovers (8)	Bye		
Sunday 1 November 2020
56	Aylesbury United (8)	2–4	Margate (7)	243
Tuesday 3 November 2020
24	Coalville Town (7)	3–3 (2–4 p)	Matlock Town (7)	362
36	Marlow (8)	2–1	Berkhamsted (8)	230
49	Uxbridge (8)	2–1	Hayes & Yeading United (7)	251
63	Taunton Town (7)	2–4	Truro City (7)	427
Wednesday 4 November 2020
2	Atherton Collieries (7)	0–3	City of Liverpool (8)	294
43	Merstham (7)	1–3	Carshalton Athletic (7)	166
52	Bishop's Stortford (7)	3–2	Brentwood Town (8)	406

== First round proper ==
The draw was made on 2 November 2020. Originally scheduled for 14 November 2020, the first round proper ties were postponed due to the COVID-19 pandemic.

Tie	Home team (tier)	Score	Away team (tier)	Att.
Saturday 5 December 2020
32	Moneyfields (8)	1–5	Truro City (7)	237
34	Evesham United (8)	1–1 (5–4 p)	Bideford (8)	309
35	Swindon Supermarine (7)	3–2	Dorchester Town (7)	289
36	Poole Town (7)	P–P	Willand Rovers (8)	
Tuesday 8 December 2020
1	Ashton United (7)	2–1	South Shields (7)	0
2	Runcorn Linnets (8)	2–2 (2–3 p)	Morpeth Town (7)	270
3	Witton Albion (7)	P–P	Bamber Bridge (7)	
4	Marske United (8)	3–1	Warrington Town (7)	0
5	Nantwich Town (7)	3–1	Workington (8)	272
6	Marine (8)	P–P	Hyde United (7)	
7	Buxton (7)	1–2	City of Liverpool (8)	0
8	Royston Town (7)	3–1	Tamworth (7)	179
9	Grantham Town (7)	P–P	St Ives Town (7)	
10	Coleshill Town (8)	5–2	Matlock Town (7)	0
11	St Neots Town (8)	3–1	Kings Langley (7)	270
12	Hitchin Town (7)	3–0	Mickleover Sports (7)	203
13	Marlow (8)	1–4	Nuneaton Borough (7)	135
14	Biggleswade Town (7)	0–0 (3–5 p)	Bedford Town (8)	201
15	AFC Rushden & Diamonds (7)	1–5	Peterborough Sports (7)	252
16	Kidsgrove Athletic (8)	P–P	Stamford (8)	
17	Basford United (7)	5–0	Rushall Olympic (7)	0
18	Welwyn Garden City (8)	3–1	Hednesford Town (7)	119
19	Aveley (8)	1–0	Hastings United (8)	139

Tie	Home team (tier)	Score	Away team (tier)	Att.
20	Carshalton Athletic (7)	3–0	Barking (8)	396
21	Lowestoft Town (7)	0–3	Cheshunt (7)	200
22	Haringey Borough (7)	2–1	Bishop's Stortford (7)	192
23	Needham Market (7)	P–P	Leiston (7)	
24	Margate (7)	W/O	Burgess Hill Town (8)	
Burgess Hill Town awarded a walkover due to Margate withdrawing from the competition.
25	Corinthian-Casuals (7)	W/O	Walton Casuals (7)	
Corinthian-Casuals awarded a walkover due to Walton Casuals withdrawing from the competition.
26	Hornchurch (7)	4–1	Wingate & Finchley (7)	208
27	Uxbridge (8)	1–3	Cray Wanderers (7)	102
28	Leatherhead (7)	0–1	Felixstowe & Walton United (8)	223
30	Salisbury (7)	0–1	Bracknell Town (8)	402
31	North Leigh (8)	0–1	Frome Town (8)	105
33	Thame United (8)	2–5	Bognor Regis Town (7)	161
36	Poole Town (7)	3–1	Willand Rovers (8)	257
37	Weston-super-Mare (7)	1–3	Chesham United (7)	0
Wednesday 9 December 2020
29	Enfield Town (7)	2–2 (3–4 p)	Maldon & Tiptree (8)	335
Thursday 10 December 2020
9	Grantham Town (7)	3–4	St Ives Town (7)	0
Saturday 12 December 2020
3	Witton Albion (7)	2–0	Bamber Bridge (7)	300
6	Marine (8)	1–0	Hyde United (7)	400
16	Kidsgrove Athletic (8)	0–2	Stamford (8)	198
23	Needham Market (7)	2–1	Leiston (7)	230

== Second round proper ==
The draw was made on 9 December 2020.

Tie	Home team (tier)	Score	Away team (tier)	Att.
Saturday 12 December 2020
19	Hitchin Town (7)	0–4	Peterborough Sports (7)	385
20	Basford United (7)	3–0	Felixstowe & Walton United (8)	247
39	Swindon Supermarine (7)	0–0 (5–4 p)	Carshalton Athletic (7)	221
Monday 14 December 2020
13	Evesham United (8)	0–3	Boston United (6)	370
Tuesday 15 December 2020
1	Spennymoor Town (6)	6–2	Marske United (8)	0
2	Witton Albion (7)	2–5	Nantwich Town (7)	351
3	Chester (6)	3–1	Bradford (Park Avenue) (6)	552
4	Guiseley (6)	2–0	Chorley (6)	0
5	Gateshead (6)	2–3	Farsley Celtic (6)	0
6	Ashton United (7)	3–3 (4–2 p)	York City (6)	0
7	Curzon Ashton (6)	1–4	AFC Fylde (6)	0
9	Marine (8)	0–1	Southport (6)	400
10	Blyth Spartans (6)	W/O	Morpeth Town (7)	
Morpeth Town awarded a walkover due to Blyth Spartans withdrawing after a positive test for COVID-19 within their camp.
11	Stamford (8)	1–0	Kidderminster Harriers (6)	0
12	Brackley Town (6)	3–2	Royston Town (7)	159
14	Coleshill Town (8)	1–10	AFC Telford United (6)	0
15	Leamington (6)	5–0	St Ives Town (7)	0
16	Alfreton Town (6)	W/O	Bedford Town (8)	
Alfreton Town awarded a walkover due to several Bedford Town players testing positive for COVID-19, forcing them to forfeit.
17	Hereford (6)	3–0	St Neots Town (8)	285
18	Kettering Town (6)	5–1	Nuneaton Borough (7)	177
21	Gloucester City (6)	4–2	Needham Market (7)	808

Tie	Home team (tier)	Score	Away team (tier)	Att.
22	Slough Town (6)	2–2 (5–6 p)	Dartford (6)	0
23	Dulwich Hamlet (6)	3–1	Cheshunt (7)	0
24	Welling United (6)	0–2	Oxford City (6)	231
25	Bracknell Town (8)	2–3	Havant & Waterlooville (6)	324
26	Billericay Town (6)	1–1 (2–4 p)	Braintree Town (6)	302
27	Dorking Wanderers (6)	2–0	Hungerford Town (6)	
28	Maidstone United (6)	P–P	Poole Town (7)	
29	Concord Rangers (6)	P–P	Truro City (7)	
30	Aveley (8)	1–3	Chesham United (7)	121
31	Corinthian-Casuals (7)	P–P	Hemel Hempstead Town (6)	
32	Ebbsfleet United (6)	1–1 (4–2 p)	Chippenham Town (6)	0
33	Bath City (6)	3–2	Chelmsford City (6)	0
34	Maldon & Tiptree (8)	2–1	Bognor Regis Town (7)	184
35	St Albans City (6)	3–0	Cray Wanderers (7)	174
36	Welwyn Garden City (8)	2–1	Burgess Hill Town (8)	216
37	Tonbridge Angels (6)	0–1	Hornchurch (7)	0
38	Haringey Borough (7)	3–1	Eastbourne Borough (6)	199
40	Frome Town (8)	W/O	Hampton & Richmond Borough (6)	
Frome Town awarded a walkover due to Hampton & Richmond Borough withdrawing after a staff member tested positive for COVID-19.
Wednesday 16 December 2020
8	Darlington (6)	2–0	City of Liverpool (8)	0
Saturday 19 December 2020
28	Maidstone United (6)	2–0	Poole Town (7)	0
29	Concord Rangers (6)	1–2	Truro City (7)	0
31	Corinthian-Casuals (7)	0–0 (2–4 p)	Hemel Hempstead Town (6)	0

== Third round proper ==
The draw was made on 9 December with ties scheduled to be played on 19 December. Stamford were awarded a bye due to the withdrawal of Macclesfield Town.

Tie	Home team (tier)	Score	Away team (tier)	Att.
Saturday 19 December 2020
1	Darlington (6)	2–2 (5–3 p)	AFC Telford United (6)	0
2	Peterborough Sports (7)	3–2	Basford United (7)	0
3	FC Halifax Town (5)	3–3 (4–2 p)	Hartlepool United (5)	0
4	Alfreton Town (6)	P–P	King's Lynn Town (5)	
5	Solihull Moors (5)	4–0	Farsley Celtic (6)	0
6	Wrexham (5)	0–0 (5–6 p)	Leamington (6)	0
7	Altrincham (5)	2–1	Chester (6)	0
Match played at Chester.
8	Stockport County (5)	3–1	Guiseley (6)	0
9	Ashton United (7)	1–2	Kettering Town (6)	0
10	Spennymoor Town (6)	2–2 (4–5 p)	Southport (6)	0
11	Morpeth Town (7)	0–3	Notts County (5)	0
12	Nantwich Town (7)	0–1	Hereford (6)	433
13	Chesterfield (5)	0–0 (4–3 p)	Brackley Town (6)	0
14	Boston United (6)	1–1 (4–2 p)	AFC Fylde (6)	0
15	Dorking Wanderers (6)	3–1	Barnet (5)	0
16	Weymouth (5)	3–2	Maidenhead United (5)	306
18	Chesham United (7)	0–1	Torquay United (5)	0
19	Dagenham & Redbridge (5)	5–2	Ebbsfleet United (6)	0

Tie	Home team (tier)	Score	Away team (tier)	Att.
20	St Albans City (6)	0–2	Sutton United (5)	0
21	Dulwich Hamlet (6)	1–2	Hornchurch (7)	0
22	Welwyn Garden City (8)	1–5	Aldershot Town (5)	0
23	Havant & Waterlooville (6)	1–0	Braintree Town (6)	0
24	Bath City (6)	4–0	Swindon Supermarine (7)	0
25	Dartford (6)	0–1	Haringey Borough (7)	0
28	Woking (5)	2–1	Dover Athletic (5)	0
29	Maldon & Tiptree (8)	P–P	Gloucester City (6)	
31	Wealdstone (5)	4–3	Eastleigh (5)	0
	Stamford (8)	Bye		
Tuesday 22 December 2020
4	Alfreton Town (6)	1–3	King's Lynn Town (5)	
26	Bromley (5)	2–0	Hemel Hempstead Town (6)	
Wednesday 23 December 2020
17	Oxford City (6)	W/O	Truro City (7)	
Oxford City awarded a walkover due to a Truro City player testing positive for COVID-19, forcing them to forfeit.
30	Maidstone United (6)	W/O	Frome Town (8)	
Maidstone United awarded a walkover due to Frome Town withdrawing.
27	Boreham Wood (5)	W/O	Yeovil Town (5)	
Boreham Wood awarded a walkover due to Yeovil Town players showing symptoms for COVID-19, forcing them to forfeit.
29	Maldon & Tiptree (8)	1–7	Gloucester City (6)	

== Fourth round proper ==
The draw was made on 21 December, with ties initially scheduled to be played on 16 January.

Tie	Home team (tier)	Score	Away team (tier)	Att.
Saturday 16 January 2021
1	Kettering Town (6)	P–P	Leamington (6)	
2	FC Halifax Town (5)	P–P	Southport (6)	
3	Aldershot Town (5)	P–P	Solihull Moors (5)	
4	Weymouth (5)	0–1	Darlington (6)	0
5	Sutton United (5)	3–1	Dagenham & Redbridge (5)	0
6	Stockport County (5)	1–2	Notts County (5)	0
7	Maidstone United (6)	2–1	Dorking Wanderers (6)	0
8	Wealdstone (5)	P–P	Gloucester City (6)	
9	Boreham Wood (5)	P–P	Torquay United (5)	
10	Havant & Waterlooville (6)	W/O	Altrincham (5)	
Havant & Waterlooville awarded a walkover due to an Altrincham player testing positive for COVID-19, forcing them to forfeit.
11	Boston United (6)	P–P	Chesterfield (5)	
12	Stamford (8)	P–P	Hereford (6)	
13	Bath City (6)	0–1	Peterborough Sports (7)	0

Tie	Home team (tier)	Score	Away team (tier)	Att.
14	Hornchurch (7)	1–1 (3–0 p)	King's Lynn Town (5)	0
15	Bromley (5)	P–P	Woking (5)	
16	Oxford City (6)	4–2	Haringey Borough (7)	0
Monday 18 January 2021
8	Wealdstone (5)	3–1	Gloucester City (6)	0
Tuesday 19 January 2021
1	Kettering Town (6)	0–3	Leamington (6)	
2	FC Halifax Town (5)	1–2	Southport (6)	
3	Aldershot Town (5)	3–2	Solihull Moors (5)	
9	Boreham Wood (5)	0–4	Torquay United (5)	
12	Stamford (8)	0–2	Hereford (6)	
15	Bromley (5)	1–1 (6–7 p)	Woking (5)	
Wednesday 20 January 2021
11	Boston United (6)	1–1 (1–4 p)	Chesterfield (5)	

== Fifth round proper ==
The draw was made on 18 January, with ties initially scheduled to be played on 6 February.

Tie	Home team (tier)	Score	Away team (tier)	Att.
Saturday 6 February 2021
1	Sutton United (5)	0–1	Woking (5)	0
2	Aldershot Town (5)	W/O	Chesterfield (5)	
Aldershot Town awarded a walkover due to a Chesterfield player testing positive for COVID-19, forcing them to forfeit.
3	Darlington (6)	4–1	Wealdstone (5)	0
4	Hereford (6)	1–0	Leamington (6)	0
5	Havant & Waterlooville (6)	2–2 (2–4 p)	Notts County (5)	0
6	Southport (6)	0–2	Torquay United (5)	0
7	Oxford City (6)	2–0	Peterborough Sports (7)	0
8	Hornchurch (7)	5–4	Maidstone United (6)	0

== Quarter-finals ==
The draw was made on 8 February 2021, with ties scheduled to be played on 27 February.

Tie	Home team (tier)	Score	Away team (tier)	Att.
Saturday 27 February 2021
1	Notts County (5)	3–1	Oxford City (6)	0
2	Darlington (6)	1–2	Hornchurch (7)	0
3	Aldershot Town (5)	1–1 (3–5 p)	Hereford (6)	0
4	Woking (5)	1–0	Torquay United (5)	0

== Semi-finals ==
The draw was made on 1 March 2021, with ties scheduled to be played on 27 March.

27 March 2021
15:00

Notts County (5)	3–3	Hornchurch (7)
Wootton 10'; Rodrigues 42'; Sam 78'		Spence 38'; Nash 45+3', 90+1'
Penalties
Wootton (penalty scored); O'Brien (penalty scored); Reeves (penalty missed); Knowles (penalty scored); Sam (penalty scored)	4–5	Clark (penalty scored); Nash (penalty scored); Muldoon (penalty scored); Hayles (penalty scored); Dickson (penalty scored)

Meadow Lane, Nottingham
Attendance: 0

27 March 2021
15:00

Hereford (6)	1–0	Woking (5)
Butlin 21'

Edgar Street, Hereford
Attendance: 0

== Final ==
The final was held on Saturday 22 May 2021.

22 May 2021
16:15 BST

Hereford	1–3	Hornchurch
Owen-Evans 13'	Report	Hayles (yellow card) 40'; Ruff 75'; Nash 86', (yellow card) 87'; Brown 90+5'; Parcell (yellow card) 90+5'

Wembley Stadium, London
Attendance: 6,000
Referee: Tony Harrington
