= Hereford F.C. =

Association football club in Herefordshire, England

Hereford
- Full name: Hereford Football Club
- Nickname: The Bulls
- Founded: 22 December 2014; 11 years ago
- Ground: Edgar Street
- Capacity: 5,250
- Coordinates: 52.0607°N 2.7175°W
- Chairman: Chris Ammonds
- Manager: Aaron Downes
- League: National League North
- 2025–26: National League North, 20th of 24
- Website: herefordfc.co.uk
Home colours	Away colours

Hereford Football Club is an English association football club from the city of Hereford. They were founded in 2014 as a phoenix club for Hereford United, and inherited their Edgar Street stadium. They are nicknamed 'The Whites' after their predominantly white kit, or 'The Bulls' after the Hereford cattle breed, and their motto is 'Our greatest glory lies not in never having fallen, but in rising when we fall'. The club is affiliated to the Herefordshire County Football Association.

As of the 2024–25 season, the club plays in the National League North, at the sixth tier of the English football league system. They entered the football pyramid before the 2015–16 season and won three league titles in their first three campaigns—the Midland League Premier Division followed by the Southern League Division One South & West and the Southern League Premier Division.

== History ==
=== Foundation ===
Following the winding up of Hereford United on 19 December 2014, the Hereford United Supporters Trust (HUST) vowed to start a new phoenix club. Three days later, local businessman Jon Hale, who had earlier been chairman of HUST, registered the name Hereford Football Club with the Herefordshire County Football Association, in conjunction with the trust and a group of local businessmen. A press release followed on 24 December, outlining plans to let HUST members decide on the club's kits and crest. It also addressed the issue of the ownership structure, with the Hereford United Supporters Trust being given the opportunity to become the largest single shareholder, with individuals and corporate benefactors being barred from owning more than 49% of the new club. The press release stated that HUST's stake would be 'much more' than this.

Chart of Hereford United / Hereford FC yearly table positions since election into the Football League.

The club's official website went live on 29 December. Hale gave an interview with Trevor Owens on BBC Hereford and Worcester on 3 January 2015, citing Hereford United's untenable debts as the reason for the business group's reluctance to engage with the former club. The appointment of Hale as Hereford F.C. chairman was released in an FAQ on 13 January. An open meeting two days later confirmed several appointments, including HUST chairman Chris Williams as vice chairman, Hugh Brooks as finance director, George Webb as commercial director and Phil Eynon as governance director (the latter three being part of the Hale-led group of local businessmen).

On 20 and 21 January, HUST members voted in favour of the proposal from the Hale group, with 96.71% voting to accept the plans. The Hereford F.C. bid had been the only approach submitted to HUST. Two weeks later, Herefordshire Council confirmed that the club had secured a five-year lease for the city's Edgar Street stadium.

The club opened applications for the position of club manager on 27 February and, following 42 applications, Peter Beadle was announced as the successful candidate by the board on 17 April 2015. Beadle, the final caretaker manager of the predecessor club, was joined by assistant manager Matt Bishop, who had served as a national coach developer with The Football Association.

=== 2015–16 season ===
On 14 May 2015, the FA confirmed that Hereford would compete in the Midland Football League Premier Division (9th tier) for the club's first season. As a consequence, this meant that the club were entered into the FA Vase and the Midland League Cup.

The first game, a pre-season friendly, took place away at Malvern Town on 7 July 2015, a 3–2 victory for Hereford in which the winning goal was scored by Dale Hodge, in front of a record crowd for the hosts. Four days later, Hereford hosted their first match, a friendly against FC United of Manchester at Edgar Street, with Nathan Hughes scoring the only goal in a victory watched by around 4,250 spectators. They won 4–1 against Dunkirk in their first league match on 8 August, in front of a crowd of 4,062; this broke the league record attendance of 1,280, and was higher than four attendances that day in Football League One.

On 10 December 2015, while in first place in the league, the club announced that they had applied for promotion to the Southern Football League for the 2016–17 season. The league campaign had started with a shaky start, but they managed to put together a long winning run, which eventually came to an end after 27 consecutive wins, in a 1–1 draw at home to Alvechurch on 23 January 2016, and the unbeaten run of 34 games came to an end on 23 February, following a 2–0 loss at home to Highgate United.

Hereford broke their attendance record again in the FA Vase semi-final first leg against Salisbury on 12 March. Hereford won 1–0 in front of a record crowd of 4,683. On 25 April, Hereford clinched the league title following a 4–0 away win at Coventry Sphinx and were subsequently promoted to the Southern League South and West Division. A week later, the club picked up their second trophy, the Herefordshire County Cup, following a 5–1 win over Westfields. Hereford secured their third trophy of the season, the Midland Football League Cup, on 10 May, following a 3–1 win over Walsall Wood at Solihull Moors' Damson Park. On 22 May, Hereford lost 4–1 in the FA Vase Final to Morpeth Town at Wembley Stadium.

=== 2016–17 season ===
On 12 May 2016, it was confirmed that Hereford would compete in the Southern League Division One South & West, following their promotion from the Midland League Premier Division. The season saw the club make their first appearance in both the FA Cup and the FA Trophy. It was announced on 24 May, that assistant manager Matt Bishop would be leaving the club, and he was replaced by Steve Jenkins on 30 May. The club decided to withdraw from the Southern League Cup in an attempt to focus on the league. The club went out of the FA Cup at the third qualifying round at Tonbridge Angels and exited the FA Trophy in the preliminary round at Salisbury. On 12 October, the club announced that manager Peter Beadle had signed his first contract with the club, on a rolling 12-month deal. On 19 October, it was announced that Chairman John Hale had stepped down and was to be replaced in the interim by Chris Williams, who was replaced by Ken Kinnersley on 3 January 2017.

On 4 March 2017, their away match against Didcot Town was abandoned due to crowd disturbances after a few Hereford fans went on to the pitch in celebration of the team taking the lead in the dying minutes of the game. Two men from Hereford were later arrested. After reviewing reports and video footage of the incidents, the FA decided to take no further action against either club, rather highlighting how sensationalised and ill-informed some of the news reporting, at the time, had been. Disciplinary action, however, was taken against three Hereford supporters, one of the Didcot players and the Didcot team coach. The Southern League also ordered the game to be replayed—which was subsequently played behind closed doors on 11 April 2017, with Hereford winning 2–1.

=== 2017–18 season ===
Following their promotion in the previous season, it was announced Hereford would play in the Southern League Premier Division. It was also announced that captain Joel Edwards was to be released after two seasons with the club, with Jimmy Oates taking over his role.

Hereford notably had runs in the FA Cup and FA Trophy. In the FA Cup, Hereford after beating Godalming Town, Kempston Rovers and A.F.C. Hornchurch, Hereford were drawn a game away to Eastleigh where goals from Mike McGrath and Garyn Preen (who was unable to finish the match) took Hereford into the first round for the first time in their history. In the first round, a John Mills goal progressed the Bulls past AFC Telford United and into the second round, where they were drawn against Fleetwood Town. Hereford earned themselves a replay at Edgar Street. The Bulls lost 2–0 in front of an attendance of 4,235 and the BT Sport Cameras. In the FA Trophy, Hereford beat Weymouth, Potters Bar Town and Oxford City to reach the first round. A 3–2 win over National League side Dagenham & Redbridge set up a tie against Wealdstone. A moment of controversy marked a turning point in the Second Round match, when defender Dara O'Shea seemed to bring down a player which resulted in him getting sent off. Footage later on showed O'Shea should not have been given a red card so the FA reversed the decision. Hereford ended up losing that game 1–0.

On the domestic side, in January, Hereford came back from 2–0 down in injury time to salvage a 2–2 draw with promotion chasing Slough Town after goals from Jimmy Oates and Keyon Reffell, the latter coming 6 minutes into additional time. Hereford's away unbeaten run in the league came to an end in January 2018 due to defeat at the hands of King's Lynn. This unbeaten run stretched back to August 2015. In February 2018, Hereford fans were punished after multiple flares were thrown onto the pitch at Farnborough. Farnborough player Lewis Ferrell then retaliated and threw the flare back at Hereford fans, which resulted in him being shown a straight red card. On Tuesday 17 April, Hereford travelled to Biggleswade Town where a 1–0 away victory saw them become league champions for a third consecutive season. They lifted the Southern Football League shield following a 4–1 win against Kettering Town and finished the season with a 6–0 home win over Hereford Lads Club to win the Herefordshire County Cup for a third successive time.

=== 2018–19 season ===
On 13 September 2018, after three consecutive league titles, Peter Beadle was sacked as manager of Hereford, a month into the new season with Hereford in 12th place in the National League North. Assistant manager Steve Jenkins also departed, leaving Ryan Green as interim player-manager. On 19 September 2018, Tim Harris was appointed Head of Football, with his son-in-law Marc Richards subsequently taking the Head Coach role on 3 October 2018. They finished the season in 17th after poor performances against teams in positions low-down in the table, including 0 wins from 6 against the three relegated sides.

=== 2019–20 season ===
Three games into the campaign, and with four points from a possible nine, Marc Richards was sacked as head coach on 12 August, with his assistant Will Morford also leaving. The club announced that Head of Football Tim Harris would take interim charge of the side while searching for a new head coach. On 29 August, Russell Slade was announced as the club's new Manager. Andy Whing joined as his assistant on 13 September.

Hereford invested in a new digital scoreboard to improve commercial advertising opportunities in September 2019. Its first game in use on 8 October 2019 coincided with the club crashing out of the FA Cup at the 3rd Qualifying Round stage in a replay against Tamworth, losing 3–1 on penalties having drawn both 90-minute games 0–0. This result was Russell Slade's first home defeat.

Tim Harris resigned as Head of Football on 27 November 2019, with the position of 'Head of Football' subsequently being dissolved.

On 14 January, Assistant Coach Andy Whing left the club with no reason being given for his departure. Just 6 days later on 20 January, Manager Russell Slade left the club after a run of just one win in 18 games. Josh Gowling was named the club's interim manager on 21 January, he appointed Steve Burr as his assistant three days later.

The season was eventually abandoned with seven games still to go due to the COVID-19 pandemic, with Hereford finishing in 16th place.

=== 2020–21 season ===
Due to the COVID-19 pandemic, the majority of the 2020–21 season was cancelled or played behind closed doors. However, the club enjoyed a relatively successful season, finishing in 12th position in the National League North. In cup competitions, they were knocked out of the FA Cup to Stafford in only their third competitive match. In the FA Trophy, however, they managed to progress all the way to the 2021 Final, beating higher-tier teams Aldershot in the quarter-final, and Woking in the semi-final. They eventually lost the match at Wembley Stadium to Hornchurch, despite going ahead through Tom Owen-Evans early in the match.

=== 2021–22 season ===
The club announced on 8 May 2021 that Manager Josh Gowling and assistant Steve Burr had agreed new deals with the club, lasting for two years. A 2–1 friendly loss to historically bitter rivals Shrewsbury Town marked the first Edgar Street match without social distancing regulations in place. Hereford started the 2021–22 season badly, finding themselves bottom of the table and winless after 6 games in all competitions. They picked up their first three points in a 1–0 win away at York City, in a match that included both a goal by Tom Owen-Evans and a penalty save from goalkeeper Brandon Hall. On 16 October, the club crashed out of the FA Cup, losing 0–1 to Solihull Moors at Edgar Street. Things were brighter for the Bulls in November, going unbeaten (excluding penalty kicks) in all competitions. A final day loss to champions Gateshead meant Hereford finished the season in 12th place, collecting 55 points across 15 wins and 10 draws.

=== 2022–23 season ===
After one point from their first two games, Hereford picked up their first win of the season on 16 August, thanks to a late Luke Haines goal as the Bulls defeated Chester 1–0. Wins over Bromsgrove Sporting, Three Bridges and Bromley progressed the Bulls into the FA Cup First Round, where they drew League One Portsmouth at home. It was later announced that the match would be live on BBC Two, making it only the fourth televised match since the club reformed. Despite taking a 1–0 lead in the first half, Hereford went on to lose the game 3–1 and were knocked out of the FA Cup. On 19 November 2022, Hereford were knocked out in the second round of the FA Trophy by Heybridge Swifts, a team two steps below them, losing 3–0 at the Aspen Waite Arena.

Manager Josh Gowling left by mutual consent on 5 February 2023 following a run of three straight defeats, the last of which being a 1–0 away defeat to Farsley Celtic. Player/Assistant Manager Yan Klukowski took temporary charge until the end of the season.

Hereford briefly flirted with the play-offs early in 2023 but ultimately a poor run of form led them to be sucked into a relegation scrap and only ensured their safety with two matches remaining. A 5–0 away defeat to Blyth Spartans on the final day of the season, a result which secured safety from relegation for Blyth, ensured Hereford finished in 16th with 55 points, the same number of points as the previous season but four places lower.

=== 2023–24 season ===
Before the end of the previous season, Hereford announced Paul Caddis as their new manager, who took the reins from interim manager Yan Klukowski from 1 May 2023. As of 24 June, only one player remained from the previous season's playing squad; young defender Mark Derricott, who had only made eight substitute appearances and spent time out on loan at a lower level the season before, signed a one-year contract extension. In mid-June, Irish forward Adam Rooney was brought in as Player-Assistant Manager to Caddis.

The season started positively, picking up seven points from a possible nine from the first three league fixtures. However, four straight defeats followed, including a 4–0 defeat at newly promoted Tamworth, leaving them 18th after seven fixtures. They were dealt a double injury blow early in the season, with forwards Andy Williams and Jason Cowley both suffering long-term injuries. Following wins over Anstey Nomads, Cambridge City and Rochdale, Hereford progressed to the FA Cup first round for the second year running, being drawn against League Two Gillingham at home in which they were beaten 2–0.

A run of four consecutive wins over the Christmas period saw Hereford rise as high as 4th, but indifferent form in the second half of the season saw them drop as low as 11th. The final play-off position (7th) was still possible to achieve going into the final day of the season but would have required an 11–0 win over Boston United and two other teams to lose in order to reach it, with the Bulls ultimately losing 2–0 to the Pilgrims which secured a play-off spot for themselves. Hereford finished in 11th on 69 points, their highest ever position and points total in the National League North to date.

=== 2024–25 season ===
Hereford improved slightly on the previous season's highest ever finish and points tally in the National League North, this time finishing 10th on 76 points but once again missing out on a play-off spot on the final day. They spent the majority of the season in the play-offs and were 5th with two matches of the season remaining, but a heavy 5–1 defeat at local rivals Kidderminster Harriers and a 1–0 home defeat to Scunthorpe United saw them lose out.

In the FA Cup, Hereford advanced just one round, being knocked out in the third qualifying round by lower-graded Bishop's Stortford, after needing a replay to defeat Ilkeston Town in the previous round. In the FA Trophy, they were knocked out at the first hurdle, losing 1–0 at home to Isthmian League North Division club Brentwood Town, two steps below Hereford in the Non-League pyramid.

=== 2025–26 season ===
Hereford endured a difficult season, on and off the pitch, and was marred by two separate racism incidents and significant issues with the Edgar Street playing surface. The latter resulted in a large number of postponements and having to play three home fixtures at alternate venues, with two held at Worcester's Sixways Stadium and Redditch's Valley Stadium. They club had only played half their league fixtures by early February and faced a fixture backlog of 21 matches in 68 days.

In February, manager Paul Caddis was sacked, with assistant Adam Rooney taking charge for the following game, a 5–1 defeat away to Southport. Aaron Downes was swiftly appointed, with former Hereford United player Harry Pell joining as his assistant. After the Southport match, Hereford found themselves 11 points from safety, but with seven games in hand over Peterborough Sports in 20th.

Hereford avoided relegation on the final day of the season, after a 2–2 with already relegated Peterborough Sports coupled with a draw between Curzon Ashton and Alfreton Town that sent both clubs down. Hereford finished 20th, one place above relegation, finishing ahead of Curzon Ashton on goal difference. Before the final match, it was announced that management duo Downes and Pell had signed new deals to remain with the club for the following season.

=== Season-by-season ===
Season	League											FA Cup	FA Trophy	Other		Manager
Season	Division	Level (Step)	Pld	W	D	L	GF	GA	GD	Pts	Pos	FA Cup	FA Trophy	Other		Manager
2015–16	Midland League Premier Division	9 (5)	42	35	3	4	138	33	+105	108	1st ↑	—		FA Vase	RU	Peter Beadle
2015–16	Midland League Premier Division	9 (5)	42	35	3	4	138	33	+105	108	1st ↑	—		Midland League Cup	W	Peter Beadle
2015–16	Midland League Premier Division	9 (5)	42	35	3	4	138	33	+105	108	1st ↑	—		HFA County Challenge Cup	W	Peter Beadle
2016–17	Southern League Division One South & West	8 (4)	42	33	8	1	108	32	+76	107	1st ↑	3Q	PR	HFA County Challenge Cup	W	Peter Beadle
2017–18	Southern League Premier Division	7 (3)	46	36	5	5	111	33	+78	113	1st ↑	2R	2R	HFA County Challenge Cup	W	Peter Beadle
2018–19	National League North	6 (2)	42	11	16	15	47	58	−11	49	17th	3Q	2R	HFA County Challenge Cup	1R	Peter Beadle/Marc Richards
2019–20†	National League North	6 (2)	35	9	12	14	39	56	−17	39	16th (Note: Hereford finished 16th on a points-per-game basis)	3Q	3Q	HFA County Challenge Cup	QF (Note: Competition was abandoned due to the COVID-19 pandemic)	Marc Richards/Russell Slade/Josh Gowling
2020–21†	National League North	6 (2)	13	5	5	3	20	16	+4	20	12th	3Q	RU	HFA County Challenge Cup	– (Note: Club forfeited participation in this season's competition)	Josh Gowling
2021–22	National League North	6 (2)	42	15	10	17	51	52	−1	55	12th	4Q	2R	HFA County Challenge Cup	RU	Josh Gowling
2022–23	National League North	6 (2)	46	15	10	21	47	56	–9	55	16th	1R	2R	HFA County Challenge Cup	QF	Josh Gowling/Yan Klukowski
2023–24	National League North	6 (2)	46	20	9	17	62	66	–4	69	11th	1R	5R	HFA County Challenge Cup	RU	Paul Caddis
2024–25	National League North	6 (2)	46	22	10	14	68	51	+17	76	10th	3Q	2R	HFA County Challenge Cup	QF	Paul Caddis
2025–26	National League North	6 (2)	46	14	10	22	64	79	−15	52	20th	3Q	4R	HFA County Challenge Cup	QF	Paul Caddis/Aaron Downes
Source: FCHD

† League season was terminated before previsioned date, because of impact of the COVID-19 pandemic

Key

Champions	Runners-up	Promoted	Relegated

- ↑ = Promoted
- ↓ = Relegated
- EP = Extra preliminary round
- PR = Preliminary round
- 1Q = First qualifying round
- 2Q = Second qualifying round
- 3Q = Third qualifying round
- 4Q = Fourth qualifying round
- 1R = First round proper
- 2R = Second round proper
- 3R = Third round proper
- 4R = Fourth round proper
- 5R = Fifth round proper
- QF = Quarter-finals
- SF = Semi-finals
- RU = Runners-up
- W = Winners

== Stadium ==
Since reformation as the phoenix club, Hereford, like their predecessor, have played all of their home matches at Edgar Street. The name of the stadium directly derives from the street where it is located, which is also the A49. The club agreed a lease with the council in February 2015, and won their first match at the ground 1–0 against FC United of Manchester, in front of a crowd of 4,257.

The ground itself, which has changed little since the mid-1970s, is largely outdated and in need of redevelopment, with the Blackfriars End failing a safety inspection in July 2009. The terraced end had fallen into a state of disrepair which steadily reduced the stadium capacity from nearly 9,000 to 7,700 by November 2007. Improvements were made in the later years of the predecessor, to ensure the ground met Football League standards, including new floodlights, dressing rooms and barriers on the terraces.

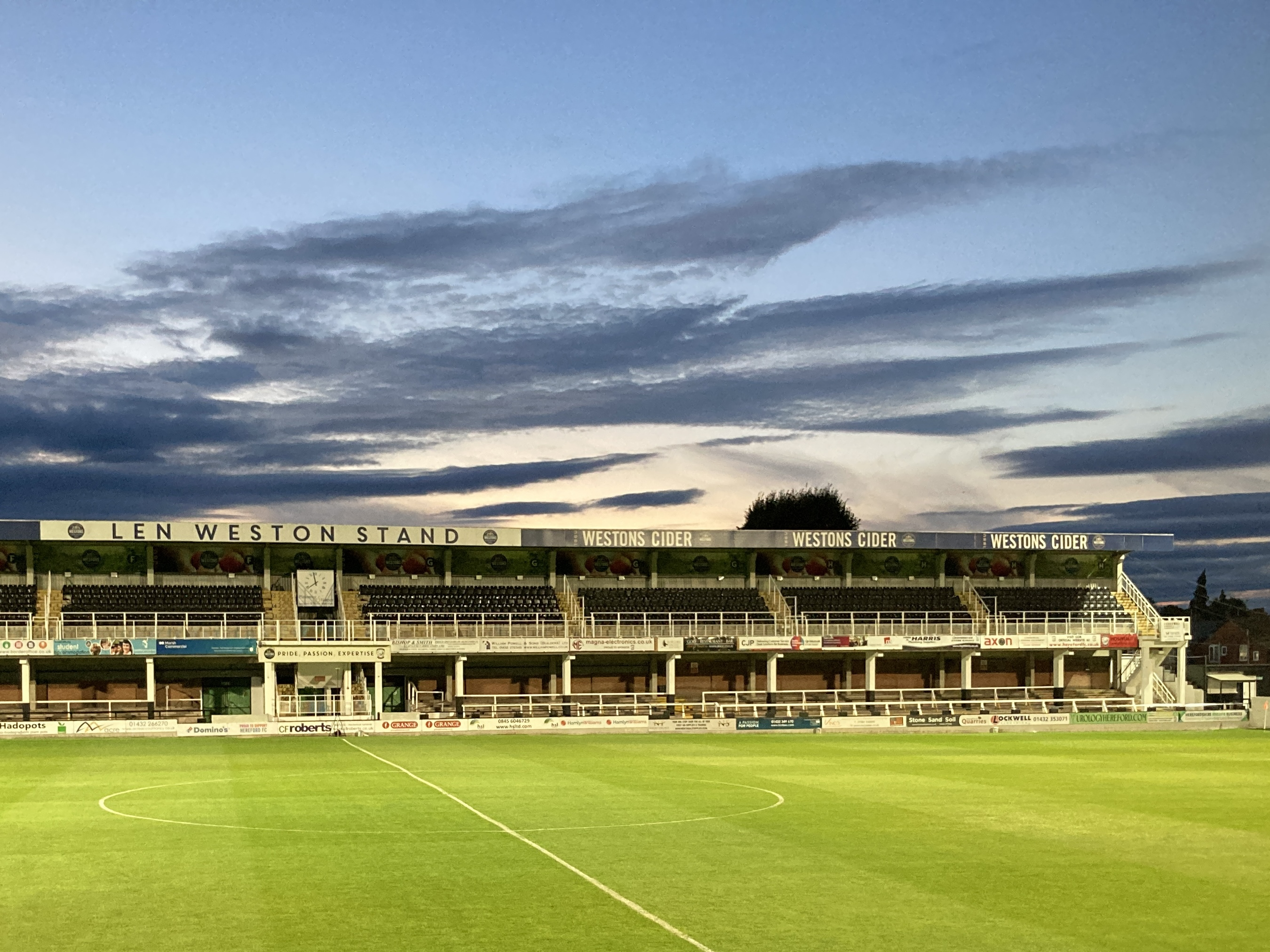
Edgar Street in 2022

Hereford FC's record attendance for a home game at Edgar Street is 4,683, for a 1–0 win in the FA Vase semi-finals against Salisbury on 13 March 2016. It hosted televised FA Cup matches twice: a Second-Round Proper Replay against Fleetwood Town in December 2017, and a First-Round Proper match against Portsmouth in November 2022. The 2020–21 FA Trophy Semi-Final between Hereford FC and Woking was also played here, although it took place behind closed doors due to the COVID-19 pandemic. Hereford came out 1–0 winners, but failed to beat Hornchurch in the Final.

== Crest and colours ==
=== Crest ===
It was announced on 1 March 2015, that 89% of the 900-plus HUST members that voted, chose a badge designed by Huw Marriott and his sons Max and Louis.

=== Colours ===
On 5 May 2015, it was announced that the club had signed a two-year kit deal with Italian manufacturer Macron. A vote was cast for the away colours, with a red and black striped kit being chosen by HUST members. On 25 March 2016, Hereford announced that their deal with Macron had been extended by two years, with a new home kit in 2016–17 alternating seasonally with the away kit. Prior to the 2020–21 Season, the club announced a new three-year deal with Adidas. On 9 July 2022, an initial three-year kit deal with Kappa was announced.

=== Sponsors ===
Season	Kit Manufacturer	Shirt Sponsor		Sleeve Sponsor	Shorts Sponsor
Season	Kit Manufacturer	Front	Rear	Sleeve Sponsor	Shorts Sponsor
2015–16	Macron	Jewson	Furniture Importers	–	South Hereford Volkswagen (FA Vase final)
2016–17	Macron	Jewson	Furniture Importers	–	–
2017–18	Macron	Jewson	Furniture Importers	–	RRA Architects
2018–19	Macron	Central Roofing	Montgomery Waters	Magna Electronics	RRA Architects (home); Your Herefordshire (away)
2019–20	Macron	Dawleys	Montgomery Waters	Magna Electronics	Shack Events (home); The Beefy Boys (away, third)
2020–21	Adidas	Dawleys	Montgomery Waters	Magna Electronics	The Beefy Boys (home); Vinco (third)
2021–22	Adidas	Dawleys	Montgomery Waters	Magna Electronics	The Beefy Boys (home)
2022–23	Kappa	Dawleys	Montgomery Waters	Magna Electronics	The Beefy Boys (home)
2023–24	Kappa	Dawleys	Montgomery Waters	Magna Electronics	Able Locksmiths (home)
2024–25	Kappa	Dawleys	Montgomery Waters	Magna Electronics	Able Locksmiths (home, away)
2025–26	MandM	Dawleys	Montgomery Waters	Magna Electronics	Able Locksmiths (home)
2026–27	MandM	Autopack			

== Support ==
Hereford's fanzine is called Talking Bull.

During Hereford's inaugural season they averaged a league attendance of 2,836, a figure higher than six Football League Two sides.

=== Rivals ===
Hereford maintain a strong rivalry with Shrewsbury Town, originating with the former Hereford United. It is known as the A49 derby, after the road separating the two and was listed nineteenth in The Daily Telegraph's twenty fiercest rivalries in English football. However, since Hereford's resurrection the two sides have never met in a competitive fixture.

== Players and staff ==
=== First-team squad ===
As of 18 November 2026

Note: Flags indicate national team as defined under FIFA eligibility rules; some limited exceptions apply. Players may hold more than one non-FIFA nationality.

No.	Pos.	Nation	Player
1	GK	ENG	Theo Richardson
2	DF	ENG	Aaron Skinner
3	DF	ENG	Lewis Hudson (captain)
4	DF	ENG	Kam Kandola (vice-captain)
5	DF	ENG	Will Merrett (on loan from Forest Green Rovers)
6	MF	ENG	Joe Willis
7	MF	BER	Keziah Martin
9	FW	ENG	Cawley Cox
10	FW	ENG	Danny Waldron
11	MF	ENG	Fin Holmes

No.	Pos.	Nation	Player
14	MF	ENG	Luke Spokes
15	FW	ENG	Jordan Williamson
17	DF	ENG	Joseph James
19	FW	ENG	Harrison Iwunze (on loan from Notts County)
20	MF	ENG	Preston Bitemo
21	GK	ENG	Oliver Lewis
23	MF	ENG	Billy Phillips
25	DF	ENG	Harry Jones
28	DF	ENG	Kyle Howkins
30	MF	ENG	Kameron Muir (on loan from Notts County)

==== Out on loan ====
Note: Flags indicate national team as defined under FIFA eligibility rules; some limited exceptions apply. Players may hold more than one non-FIFA nationality.

No. / Pos. / Nation / Player; 24 / MF / ENG / Jack Tolley (at Hereford Pegasus)	No. / Pos. / Nation / Player; — / DF / ENG / Callum Witts (at Coleshill Town)

=== Current management and staff ===
Name	Role
(Australia) Aaron Downes	Manager
(England) Harry Pell	Assistant Manager
(England) Daniel Brayson	Head Physio
(England) Shaun Edwards	Head Goalkeeping Coach
(England) Dan Pace	Kitman
(England) Ben Bowen	Groundsman

== Managers ==
Name	From	Until	Duration	Record (Note: Does not include matches played in the HFA County Challenge Cup)						
Name	From	Until	Duration	Pld	W	D	L	GF	GA	Win %
(England) Peter Beadle	17 April 2015	13 September 2018	3y 4m 28d	174	135	21	18	453	140	77.59%
(Wales) Ryan Green (interim)	13 September 2018	2 October 2018	20d	5	1	1	3	4	11	20.00%
(England) Marc Richards	2 October 2018	12 August 2019	10m 11d	38	11	15	12	50	55	28.95%
(England) Tim Harris (interim)	12 August 2019	29 August 2019	18d	4	2	1	1	4	5	50.00%
(England) Russell Slade	29 August 2019	20 January 2020	4m 23d	24	5	9	10	24	36	20.83%
(England) Josh Gowling (Note: Initially appointed as interim manager but was appointed as permanent manager on 12 June 2020)	21 January 2020	5 February 2023	3y 16d	112	43	27	42	146	137	38.39%
(England) Yan Klukowski (Note: Initially appointed as interim manager but was appointed as manager until the end of the season on 28 February 2023)	5 February 2023	1 May 2023	2m 27d	17	5	5	7	13	21	29.41%
(Scotland) Paul Caddis	1 May 2023	11 February 2026	2y 9m 11d	134	56	30	48	187	178	41.79%
(Republic of Ireland) Adam Rooney (interim)	11 February 2026	16 February 2026	6d	1	0	0	1	1	5	0.00%
(Australia) Aaron Downes	16 February 2026	—	9m 3d	21	9	3	9	36	33	42.86%

== Records ==
- Best FA Cup performance: Second round, 2017–18 (replay)
- Best FA Trophy performance: Runners-up, 2021–22,
- Best FA Vase performance: Runners-up, 2016–17

== Honours ==
- Southern League Premier
  - Champions: 2017–18
- Southern League Division One
  - Winners: 2016–17
  - Southern Football League, Champions of Champions Trophy 2016/17
- Midland League Premier
  - Winners: 2015–16
- Herefordshire County Cup
  - Winners (3): 2015–16, 2016–17, 2017–18
- Midland Football League Cup
  - Winners: 2015–16
- FA Trophy
  - Runners-up: 2020–21
- FA Vase
  - Runners-up: 2015–16

== Notable players ==
A number of full internationals have played for Hereford during the club's history and have either been capped before, during or after their career with the club.

- (Sierra Leone) Mustapha Bundu
- (Bermuda) Dale Eve
- (Wales) Ryan Green
- (Saint Kitts and Nevis) Raheem Hanley
- (Bermuda) Jahquil Hill
- (Afghanistan) Maziar Kouhyar
- (Saint Kitts and Nevis) Rowan Liburd
- (Pakistan) Samir Nabi
- (Republic of Ireland) Dara O'Shea
- (Barbados) Krystian Pearce
- (Gibraltar) Reece Styche
- (Saint Kitts and Nevis) Theo Wharton

A number of players have played for both Hereford United and Hereford. Players in bold currently play for Hereford.

Player	Pos.	Hereford United	Hereford
(Wales) Tony James	DF	1998–2006; 2010 (loan)	2015
(England) Rob Purdie	MF	2002–2007; 2010 (loan); 2011–2012; 2013–2014	2015–2018
(Wales) Ryan Green	DF	2003–2006; 2009–2012	2015–2019
(England) Andy Williams	FW	2004–2007; 2008–2009 (loan)	2023–2026
(England) Sam Gwynne	MF	2005–2011; 2013–2014	2015
(England) Josh Gowling	DF	2008–2009 (loan)	2018–2020
(Northern Ireland) James McQuilkin	MF	2009–2013	2020–2021
(England) Marlon Jackson	FW	2009 (loan); 2012–2013	2018
(England) Tristan Plummer	MF	2009 (loan); 2012	2016–2017
(England) Jennison Myrie-Williams	MF	2009 (loan)	2018
(England) Dan Preston	DF	2010–2011 (loan)	2017–2018
(England) Paul Downing	DF	2010 (loan)	2023–2024
(England) Joel Edwards	DF	2013–2014	2015–2017
(England) Billy Murphy	MF	2013–2014	2017–2019
(England) Jamie Edge	MF	2013–2014	2016–2017
(England) Daniel Lloyd-Weston	GK	2013–2014	2015
