= List of Gillingham F.C. players =

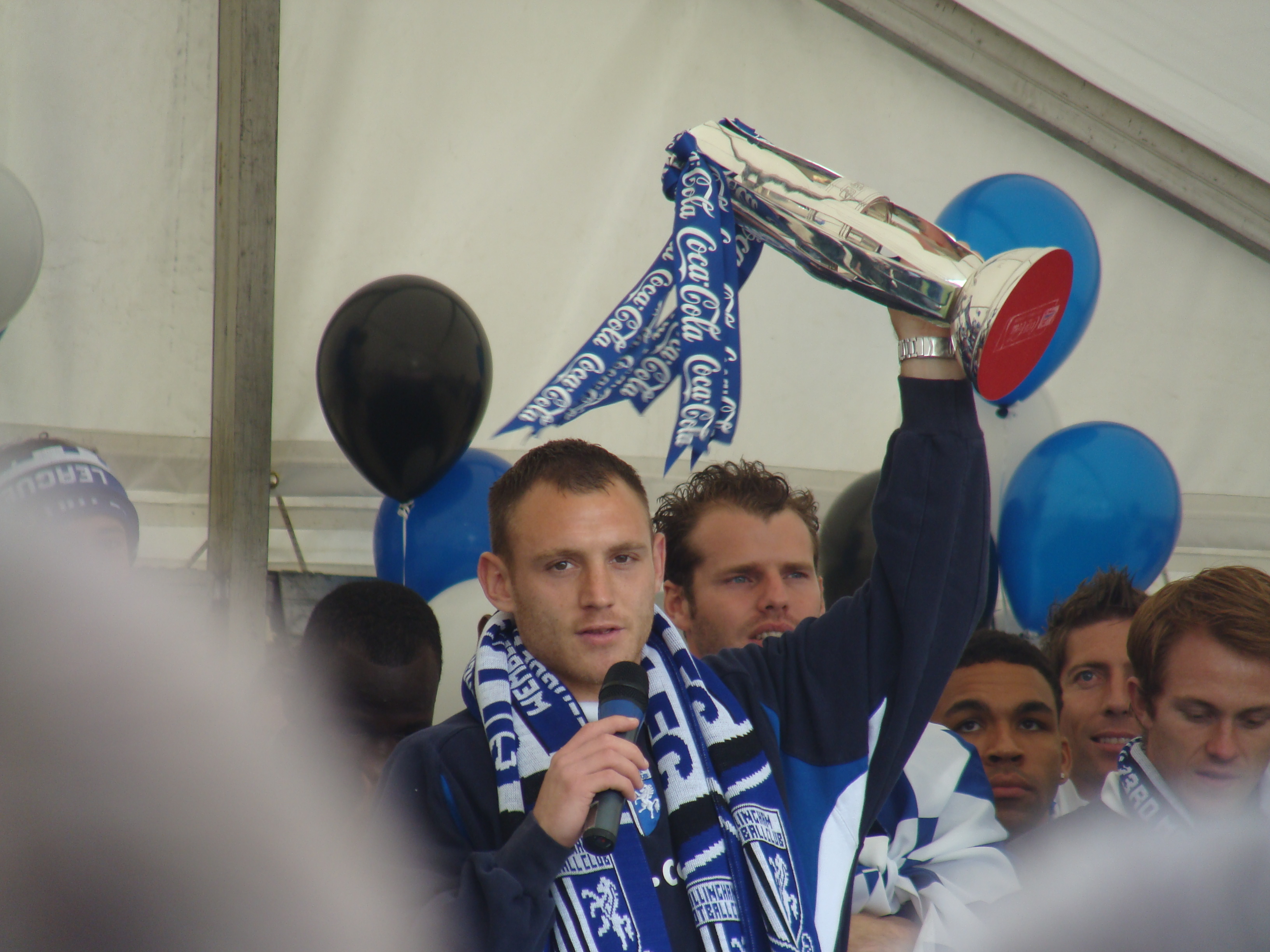
Barry Fuller captained Gillingham to victory in the 2009 Football League Two play-off final and made his hundredth appearance for the club in 2010. Partially visible second from right is Nicky Southall, one of the longest-serving players in the club's history.

Gillingham Football Club is an English professional association football club based in Gillingham, Kent, playing in EFL League Two, the fourth level of the English football league system, as of the 2025–26 season. The club was formed in 1893 as New Brompton F.C., a name which was retained until 1912, and has played home matches at Priestfield Stadium throughout its history. The club joined The Football League (now called the English Football League) in 1920, was voted out of the league in favour of Ipswich Town at the end of the 1937–38 season, but returned to the league 12 years later after it was expanded from 88 to 92 clubs. Between 2000 and 2005, Gillingham played in the second tier of the English football league system for the only time in the club's history, achieving a highest league finish of eleventh place in 2002–03. The club's first team have competed in numerous nationally and regionally organised competitions, and all players who have played 50 or more such matches, either as a member of the starting eleven or as a substitute, are listed below.

Jock Robertson, the team's captain when Gillingham first entered the League in 1920, made a total of 388 appearances, a club record which stood for over ten years until overtaken by Charlie Marks, although Marks' total of 434 appearances includes those made while the club played outside the Football League. Goalkeeper John Simpson was the first Gillingham player to make over 600 appearances. Another goalkeeper, Ron Hillyard, set a new record of 655 appearances in the early 1990s, although Simpson still holds the record for appearances solely in the Football League. The club's all-time top goalscorer, with 149 career goals, is Brian Yeo, who also shares the record for the most League goals scored in a season with Ernie Morgan.

== Key ==
- The list is ordered first by number of appearances, and then date of debut.
- Appearances as a substitute are included. This feature of the game was introduced in the Football League at the start of the 1965–66 season.
- Statistics are correct up to the end of the 2025–26 season.

Positions key
Pre-1960s		1960s–	
GK	Goalkeeper		
FB	Full back	DF	Defender
HB	Half back	MF	Midfielder
FW	Forward		

Nationality
Unless otherwise noted, the nationality of a player is determined by the country/countries for which he has played international football, or if the player has not played international football, his country of birth.
Position
Playing positions are listed according to the tactical formations that were employed at the time. Thus the change in the names of defensive and midfield positions reflects the tactical evolution that occurred from the 1960s onwards.
Club career
Club career is defined as the first and last calendar years in which the player appeared for the club in any of the competitions listed below.
Total appearances and Total goals
Total appearances and goals comprise all first team games in the English Football League, FA Cup, EFL Cup, EFL Trophy, Football League Third Division South Cup, Southern League, Southern League Cup, Kent League and Kent League Cup. Matches in wartime competitions are excluded, as are supplementary matches played in the Kent League and Thames & Medway Combination between 1895 and 1903, when the club's primary competition was the Southern League.

== Players ==
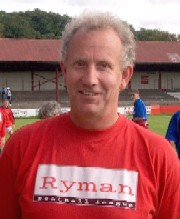
Ron Hillyard, Gillingham's appearance record holder, played a total of 655 games in a 17-year career with the club.

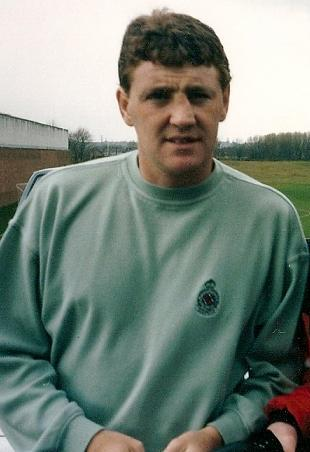
Steve Bruce played over 200 times for Gillingham and later went on to captain Manchester United.

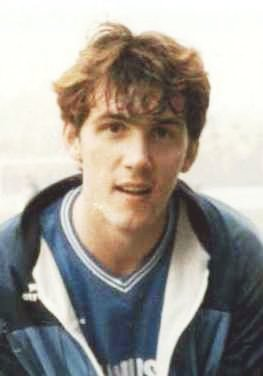
Tony Cascarino scored over 100 goals for Gillingham and later went on to play in the top divisions of English and French football.

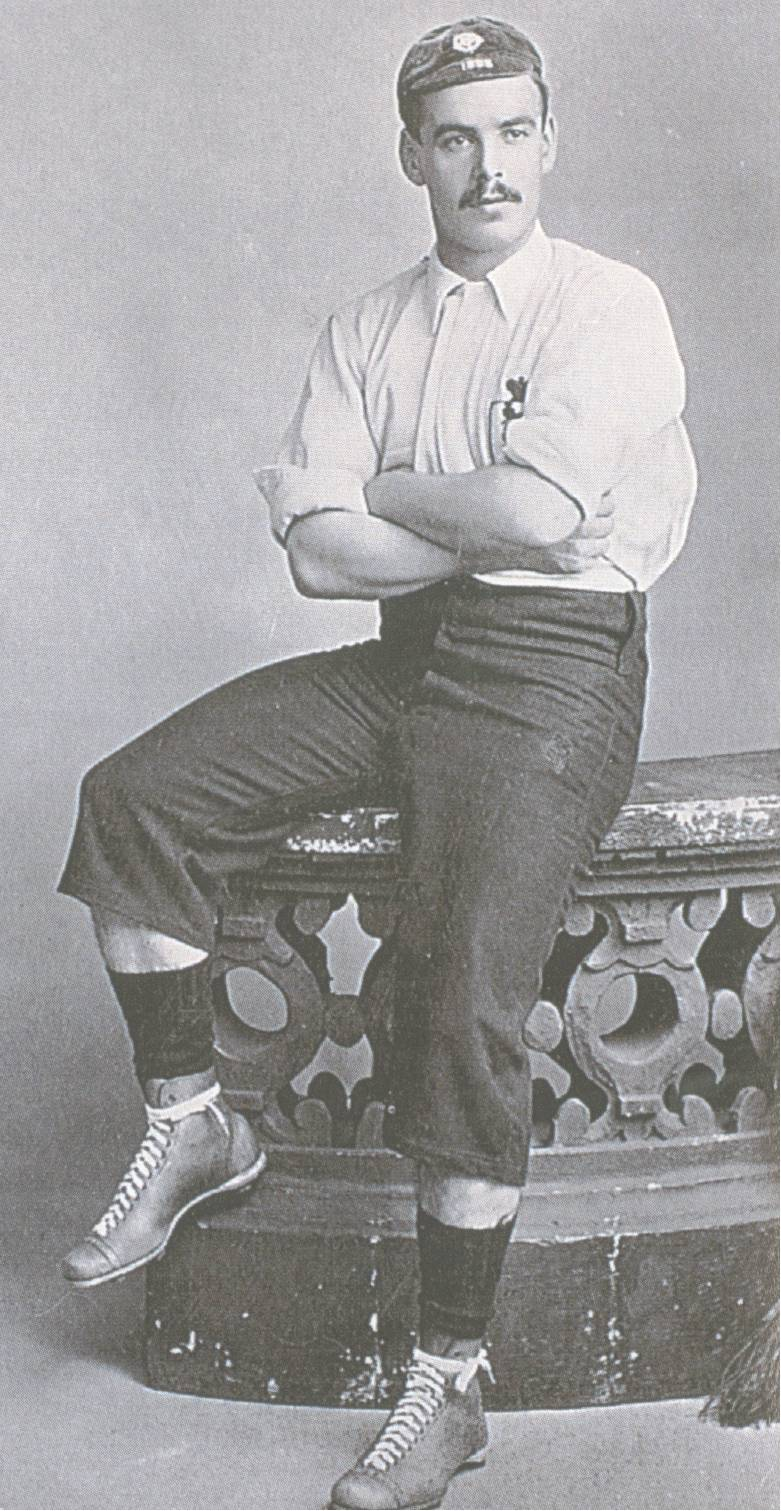
Former England international player Steve Smith played for the club at the end of his career.

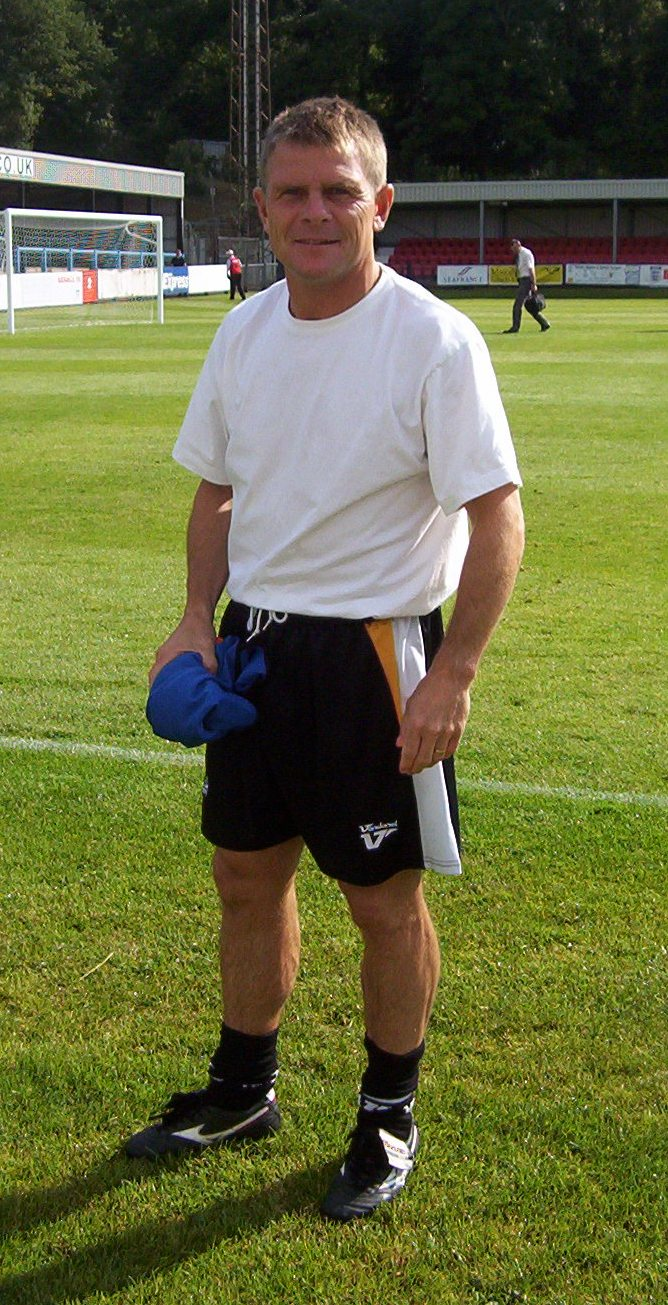
Andy Hessenthaler served as the club's player-manager for five seasons

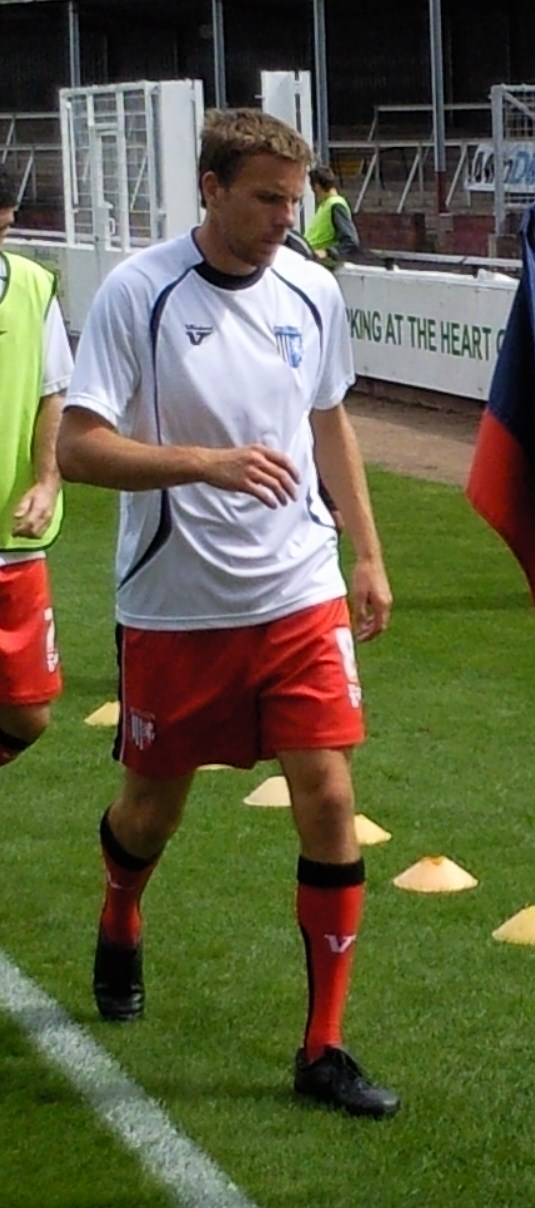
Mark Bentley joined the club in 2006

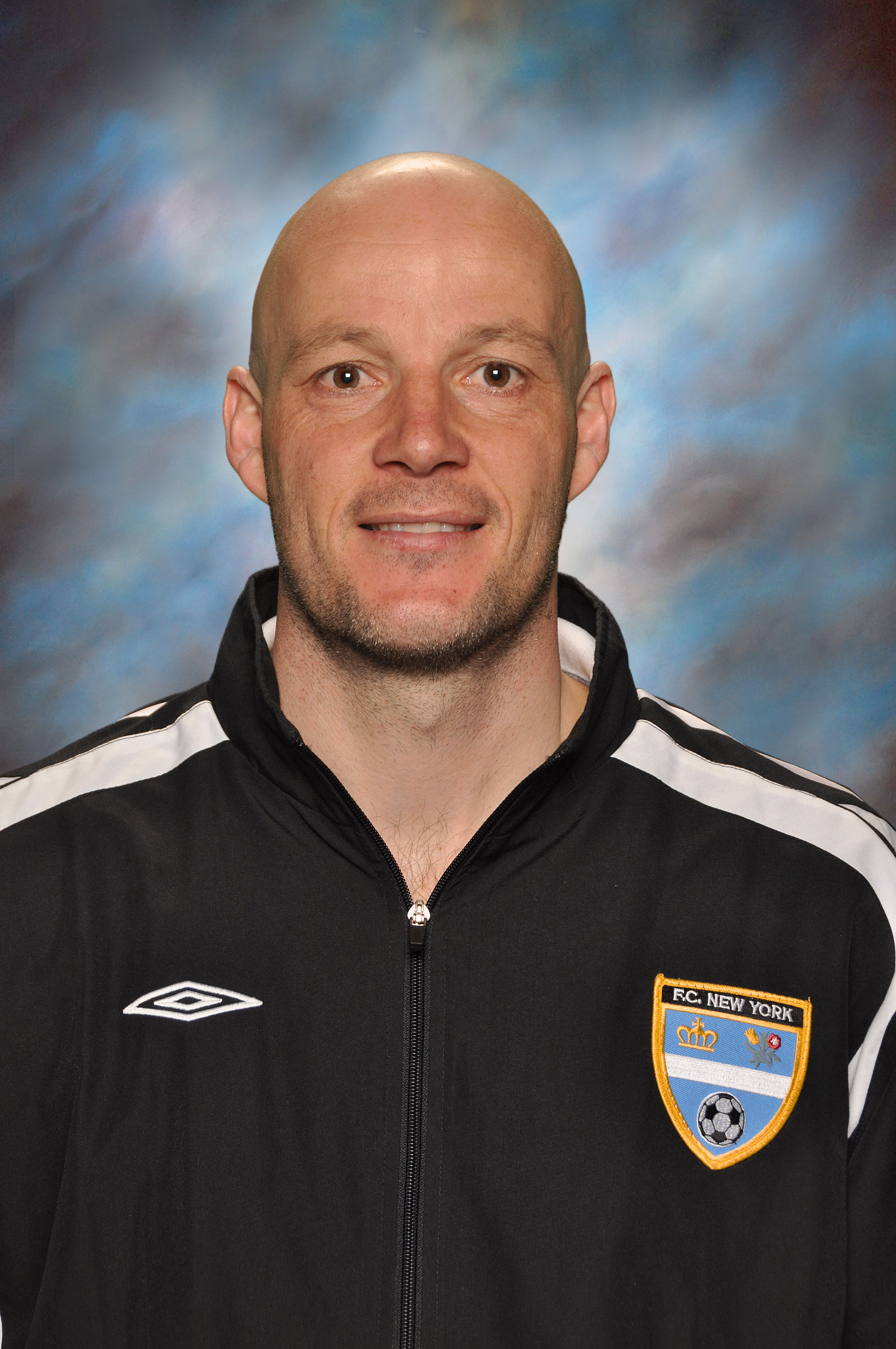
Paul Shaw joined the club following the Gills' promotion in 2000 and spent four years at Priestfield

Name	Nationality	Position	Gillingham career	Appearances	Goals	Notes
Ron Hillyard	England	GK	1974–1991	655	0	
John Simpson	England	GK	1957–1972	616	0	
Mark Weatherly	England	FW/DF	1974–1989	543	55	
Jimmy Boswell	England	MF	1946–1958	523	13	
Max Ehmer	Germany	DF	2014–2015, 2015–2020, 2021–2025	439	17	
Charlie Marks	England	DF	1943–1957	434	10	
Dick Tydeman	England	MF	1969–1977, 1981–1984	419	18	
Paul Smith	England	MF	1997–2005, 2005–2006	396	26	
Jock Robertson	England	DF	1919–1933	395	1	
Brian Yeo	England	FW	1963–1975	387	149	
Nicky Southall	England	DF/MF	1997–2001, 2002–2005, 2007–2009, 2010–2012	379	30	
Andy Hessenthaler	England	MF	1996–2006	363	36	
Damien Richardson	Republic of Ireland	FW	1972–1981	357	102	
Dennis Hunt	England	DF	1958–1968	355	6	
Barry Ashby	England	DF	1997–2005	319	10	
Ken Price	England	FW	1976–1983	294	89	
Brian Gibbs	England	FW	1962–1969	284	110	
Dave Galvin	England	DF	1969–1977	276	20	
Steve Lovell	Wales	FW	1986–1993	275	104	
Graham Knight	England	DF	1970–1979	274	10	
Jack Mahon	England	MF	1909–1920	271	5	
Tony Cascarino	Republic of Ireland	FW	1981–1987	269	110	
Chris Hope	England	DF	2000–2006	264	15	
Dave Quirke	Republic of Ireland	DF	1967–1974	254	3	
Neil Smith	England	MF	1991–1997	253	15	
Tug Wilson	England	FW	1936–1949	253	113	
Richard Green	England	DF	1991–1998	251	17	
John Meredith	England	FW	1963–1969	251	7	
Bradley Dack	England	MF	2012–2017, 2024–	247	47	
Danny Westwood	England	FW	1975–1982	238	77	
Steve Bruce	England	DF	1979–1984	237	37	
Robbie McKenzie	England	DF	2020–	233	19	
John Sharpe	England	DF	1978–1985	232	2	
Barry Fuller	England	DF	2008–2012, 2018–2020	230	1	
Stuart Nelson	England	GK	2012–2018	223	0	
Cody McDonald	England	FW	2010–2011, 2013, 2013–2017	223	81	
Vince Bartram	England	GK	1997–2004	222	0	
Gordon Pulley	England	FW	1958–1966	222	51	
Harry Hughes	England	DF	1958–1963	221	16	
George Forrester	England	MF	1947–1955	221	36	
Alec Farrall	England	MF	1960–1965	220	21	
Bill Parry	Wales	DF	1955–1961	220	4	
Fred Lester	England	DF	1931–1937	211	0	
Hughie Russell	England	FW	1946–1952	209	120	
Tommy Hall	England	FW	1920–1926	207	55	
Mark Saunders	England	MF	1998–2006	206	18	
John Overton	England	DF	1976–1981	205	11	
David Peach	England	DF	1969–1974	205	31	
Terry Nicholl	England	MF	1976–1981	204	12	
John Arnott	England	MF	1962–1968	204	3	
Ron Lewin	England	DF	1950–1955	204	1	
John Crabbe	England	MF	1976–1981	203	14	
Tommy Rigg	England	GK	1951–1956	201	0	
Nyron Nosworthy	England	DF/FW	1998–2005	199	6	
Adrian Pennock	England	DF	1996–2003	199	4	
Andrew Crofts	Wales	MF	2001–2009, 2016	197	19	
Karl Elsey	Wales	MF/DF	1985–1988, 1991–1992	196	19	
Mark Bentley	England	MF	2006–2011	195	15	
Paul Haylock	England	DF	1986–1990	194	1	
Guy Butters	England	DF	1996–2002	193	17	
Tommy Kingsnorth	England	DF	1946–1951	192	11	
Mark O'Connor	England	MF	1989–1993, 1995–1997	188	10	
Bill Williams	England	DF	1967–1972	188	8	
Danny Spiller	England	MF	2001–2007, 2010–2012	187	10	
Les Riggs	England	MF	1953–1958, 1964–1966	182	6	
Jake Hessenthaler	England	MF	2013–2018	181	9	
Ray Bailey	England	MF	1966–1971	180	10	
Jack Frettingham	England	FW	1896–1903	180	76	
Joe Martin	England	DF	2010–2015	179	8	
Tony Butler	England	DF	1990–1996	179	7	
Tony Weston	England	DF	1964–1970	179	3	
Danny Jackman	England	DF	2005–2007, 2009–2013	178	9	
Jackie Briggs	England	FW	1946–1953	178	62	
Albert Collins	England	DF	1929–1934	178	4	
Andrew Mosley	England	DF	1910–1915	178	0	
Mel Machin	England	MF	1966–1971	177	12	
George Jacks	England	MF	1972–1976	174	21	
Roy Bethell	England	FW	1929–1935	173	34	
Iffy Onuora	Scotland	FW	1996–1998, 1999–2002	172	55	
Connor Ogilvie	England	DF	2017–2021	171	10	
Peter Shaw	England	DF	1981–1986	171	5	
Alan Wilks	England	FW	1971–1976	171	34	
Alan Walker	England	DF	1987–1992	170	16	
Ryan Jackson	England	DF	2015–2017, 2020–2022	168	5	
Curtis Weston	England	MF	2008–2012	167	19	
Ian Cox	Trinidad and Tobago	DF	2003–2008	167	6	
Wally Battiste	England	FW	1920–1924, 1930–1931	165	8	
Abel Lee	England	MF	1911–1920	165	16	
Vic Niblett	England	DF	1951–1956	164	0	
Ernie Morgan	England	FW	1953–1957	163	77	
Dave Shipperley	England	DF	1974–1978	160	11	
Mel Sage	England	DF	1981–1986	159	7	
Mark Byrne	Republic of Ireland	MF	2016–2020	157	11	
John Nutter	England	DF	2007–2011	157	3	
Tom Leslie	Scotland	FW	1919–1920	156	9	
Dave Mehmet	England	MF	1982–1986	155	43	
Dave Whitelaw	England	GK	1935–1939	154	0	
Roy Proverbs	England	DF	1957–1962	153	2	
Paul Shaw	England	FW	2000–2004	151	29	
George Lloyd	England	MF	1903–1908	148	0	
Dennis Oli	England	FW	2007–2012	147	15	
Mark Patterson	England	DF	1997–2003	147	2	
Mike Green	England	DF	1968–1971	147	28	
Joe Elliott	unknown	MF	1902–1907	146	2	
Jimmy Scarth	England	FW	1951–1955	145	25	
Lee Palmer	England	DF	1987–1995	143	5	
Harry Ayres	England	MF	1950–1955	143	2	
George Piper	England	MF	1946–1951	142	7	
A.V. Bailey	unknown	GK	1909–1915	142	0	
Arthur Johnson	England	MF	1909–1915	142	5	
Richard Carpenter	England	MF	1990–1997	141	5	
Paddy Sowden	England	FW	1952–1956	140	28	
George Dorling	England	DF	1947–1951	140	3	
Ronnie Bacon	England	FW	1958–1961	139	15	
James Atherton	unknown	MF	1898–1904	139	3	
Steve Butler	England	FW	1995–1999, 1999–2000	138	25	
Kenny Hill	England	DF	1971–1977	138	8	
Jack Tucker	England	DF	2017–2022	137	4	
Jason Brown	Wales	GK	2001–2006	137	0	
Billy Hughes	England	MF	1975–1981	137	8	
Jock Taylor	Scotland	FW	1909–1913	137	45	
Glenn Morris	England	GK	2014–2016, 2022–2023, 2023–2026	136	0	
Danny Kedwell	England	FW	2011–2015	136	45	
Dean White	England	MF	1978–1983	135	28	
Jack Hannaway	England	MF	1957–1960	135	5	
Joe Dunne	Republic of Ireland	DF	1990–1996	134	1	
Johnny Warsap	England	FW	1945–1953	134	45	
Stuart O'Keefe	England	MF	2019–2023	131	5	
Dave Smith	England	FW	1986–1989	131	14	
Terry Cochrane	Northern Ireland	MF	1983–1986	131	21	
George Needham	England	MF	1920–1924	131	15	
Jim Stannard	England	GK	1995–1999	128	0	
Joe Hinnigan	England	DF	1984–1987	127	9	
Fred Maven	England	MF	1905–1909	127	3	
Tom Holland	England	GK	1932–1936	126	0	
Roland Edge	England	DF	1998–2003	125	1	
Tim O'Shea	Republic of Ireland	DF	1988–1992	125	2	
John Sitton	England	DF	1981–1985	125	5	
Gordon Riddick	England	MF	1966–1970	125	27	
Conor Masterson	Republic of Ireland	DF	2022, 2023, 2023–2026	124	11	
Simon Ratcliffe	England	MF	1995–1998	124	13	
George Kidd	Scotland	FW	1932–1935	124	2	
Chris Whelpdale	England	MF	2010, 2011–2014	122	23	
Garry Richards	England	DF	2008–2012	122	6	
Matt Jarvis	England	MF	2003–2007	122	16	
Matt Bryant	England	DF	1996–2000	122	0	
Martin Robinson	England	FW	1984–1987	121	31	
A.H. Nobbs	unknown	DF	1908–1912	121	0	
Gary Mulligan	Republic of Ireland	FW	2005–2009	120	17	
Billy Manuel	England	MF	1988–1991, 1995–1997	120	4	
Mike Burgess	Canada	DF	1962–1966	120	2	
Jimmy Watson	England	FW	1935–1938	120	45	
Dave Shearer	Scotland	FW	1984–1988	119	50	
Pat Terry	England	FW	1958–1961	119	66	
Harry Randle	England	MF	1934–1937	119	2	
Freddie Fox	England	GK	1922–1925	119	0	
Max Clark	England	DF/MF	2023–2026	117	7	
Ethan Coleman	England	MF	2023–	117	1	
Andy Barcham	England	FW	2008–2011	116	23	
Marlon King	Jamaica	FW	2000–2004	116	47	
Bill Brown	England	FW	1965–1968	116	34	
Remeao Hutton	England	DF	2024–2026	115	1	
Simeon Jackson	Canada	FW	2008–2010	115	42	
Mamady Sidibe	Mali	FW	2002–2005	114	13	
Derek Woodley	England	FW	1967–1971	114	9	
Frank Marshall	Scotland	FW	1924–1927	114	21	
Jack Payne	England	DF	2008–2013	113	6	
Gary Micklewhite	England	MF/DF	1993–1996	113	4	
Howard Pritchard	Wales	MF	1986–1988	113	23	
Ralph Miller	England	DF	1965–1968	113	4	
Johnny Burke	Republic of Ireland	GK	1947–1951	113	0	
Jack Beacham	England	MF	1929–1932	113	1	
Fred Ellis	England	MF	1925–1931	113	1	
Bill Armstrong	England	DF	1936–1946	113	0	
Simon King	England	DF	2007–2012	112	3	
Albert Court	unknown	FW	1908–1914	112	36	
Charlie Lee	England	MF	2010, 2011–2014	111	11	
Paul Clark	England	DF	1991–1994	111	2	
Norman Jones	England	MF	1923–1927	111	3	
Simon Royce	England	GK	2007–2010	109	0	
Alex MacDonald	Scotland	MF	2020–2023	108	4	
Leon Johnson	England	DF	2002–2007	108	2	
Fred Brown	England	FW	1923–1927	108	30	
Jack Reynolds	England	FW	1908–1911	108	16	
Tomáš Holý	Czech Republic	GK	2017–2019	107	0	
Jeff Johnson	Wales	MF	1982–1985	107	6	
Jonny Williams	Wales	MF	2023–2026	106	3	
Trevor Quow	England	MF	1986–1989	106	5	
Keith Oakes	England	DF	1984–1987	106	8	
Olly Lee	England	MF	2012, 2019–2020, 2021–2023	105	12	
Michael Flynn	Wales	MF	2004–2007	105	21	
Harvey Lim	England	GK	1989–1993	105	0	
Micky Adams	England	DF	1979–1983	104	4	
Charlie Rackstraw	England	FW	1964–1967	104	27	
Josh Wright	England	MF	2009, 2015–2017	103	15	
Dennis Bailey	England	FW	1995–1998	103	13	
John Martin	unknown	DF/GK	1905–1908	103	1	
Bradley Garmston	Republic of Ireland	DF	2015, 2015–2020	102	3	
Elliott List	England	MF	2015–2019	98	10	
Gary Armstrong	England	DF	1975–1980, 1983–1984	102	2	
Ian Docker	England	MF	1987–1991	101	3	
Colin Duncan	England	MF	1979–1984	101	5	
Andy Smillie	England	FW	1968–1971	101	9	
Ron Newman	England	FW	1963–1966	101	22	
Cyril Poole	England	DF	1945–1949	101	12	
David Crown	England	FW	1990–1993	100	46	
Ted West	England	DF	1954–1957	100	0	
Dave Thomas	England	FW	1945–1946, 1950–1953	100	61	
Dave Hutcheson	unknown	FW	1894–1900	100	41	
Shadrach Ogie	Republic of Ireland	DF	2023–2026	99	1	
Bill Floyd	England	DF	1905–1908	99	0	
David Perpetuini	England	MF	2001–2005	98	5	
George Bishop	Wales	MF	1929–1932	98	0	
Jimmy Nichol	Scotland	MF	1925–1927, 1937	98	2	
Tom Eaves	England	FW	2017–2019	97	40	
Adam Miller	Northern Ireland	MF	2007–2010	97	13	
Billy Millar	Scotland	FW	1953–1956	97	38	
Arthur Pickett	England	FW	1908–1911	96	20	
Adam Barrett	England	DF	2012–2015	95	3	
Guy Ipoua	Cameroon	FW	2000–2003	94	15	
Andy Arnott	England	FW	1991–1996	94	13	
Tom Hopkins	England	MF	1933–1937	94	2	
Vadaine Oliver	England	FW	2020–2022	93	31	
George Ley	England	DF	1974–1976	93	3	
John Egan	Republic of Ireland	DF	2014–2016	92	11	
Leon Legge	England	DF	2013–2015	92	8	
Marcus Browning	Wales	MF	1998–2002	92	3	
Billy Evans	England	FW	1953–1955	92	12	
George Barrie	Scotland	DF	1934–1937	92	1	
Bob Innes	Scotland	MF	1898–1901	92	8	
Tony Eeles	England	MF	1988–1993	91	5	
Luke O'Neill	England	DF	2017–2019	90	7	
Carl Asaba	England	FW	1998–2001	90	40	
Phil Kite	England	GK	1986–1989	90	0	
Tom Strang	unknown	MF	1909–1912	90	1	
Jack Bonham	Ireland	GK	2019–2021	89	0	
Josh Parker	Antigua and Barbuda	FW	2017–2019	89	18	
Geoff Hudson	England	DF	1963–1965	89	1	
Sim Raleigh	England	FW	1932–1934	89	34	
Jack Rutherford	England	DF	1924–1927	89	2	
Davie Laing	Scotland	MF	1957–1959	88	5	
Edwin Scott	England	FW	1935–1939	88	10	
Fred Liddle	England	FW	1932–1934	88	19	
Charlie Freeman	England	FW	1921–1923	88	24	
Jake Turner	England	GK	2022–2026	87	0	
Mick Galloway	England	MF	1996–1997	87	5	
Graham Pearce	England	DF	1986–1988	87	0	
Bill Berry	England	FW	1923–1926	87	11	
Jack Branfield	England	GK	1920–1922	87	0	
Mike Gibson	England	GK	1972–1974	86	0	
James Graham	unknown	MF	1897–1901	86	1	
Matt Fish	England	DF	2012–2015	85	4	
Mike Trusson	England	MF	1989–1992	85	7	
Teddy Bateup	England	GK	1908–1910	85	0	
Brandon Hanlan	England	FW	2018–2020	84	16	
Arthur Wood	England	FW	1919–1922	84	23	
Adebayo Akinfenwa	England	FW	2010–2011, 2013–2014	83	21	
Ken Pound	England	FW	1969–1971	83	12	
Syd Hartley	England	DF	1936–1938	83	2	
Bill Marriott	unknown	FW	1905–1908	83	17	
Charlie Butler	England	DF	1923–1925	82	0	
Myles Weston	England	MF	2012–2014	82	10	
Jock Henderson	Scotland	DF	1922–1924	82	9	
Martin Higgins	unknown	MF	1909–1911	82	2	
Jayden Clarke	England	MF	2023–2025	81	9	
John Akinde	England	FW	2020–2022	81	9	
Robert Taylor	England	FW	1998–2000, 2001–2002	81	39	
Gavin Peacock	England	MF	1987–1989	81	12	
John Leslie	England	FW	1983–1985	81	17	
Syd Tyler	England	DF	1927–1929	81	0	
Alan Julian	Northern Ireland	GK	2008–2011	80	0	
Mark Harris	England	DF	1995–1997	80	3	
Colin Greenall	England	DF	1986–1988	80	9	
Errol Crossan	Canada	FW	1955–1957	80	17	
Jackie Carr	Scotland	FW	1948–1951	80	30	
Dick Goffin	unknown	FW	1911–1914	80	13	
George Lapslie	England	FW	2023–2025	79	8	
Luke Norris	England	FW	2014–2016	79	15	
Paul Watson	England	DF	1992–1996	79	2	
Russell Musker	England	MF	1983–1986	79	8	
Bob Ridley	England	FW	1961–1967	79	9	
Tom Sisson	England	DF	1920–1923	79	0	
Stephen Smith	England	FW	1906–1908	79	5	
Ben Dickenson	England	FW	2014–2016	78	4	
Junior Lewis	England	FW	1999–2001	78	8	
Peter Johnson	England	DF	1989–1991	78	2	
Nicky Forster	England	FW	1992–1994	78	26	
Andy Ford	England	DF	1980–1982	78	5	
Dick Hendrie	Scotland	DF	1923–1925	78	0	
Cheye Alexander	Saint Lucia	DF	2022–2024	76	4	
Gabriel Zakuani	DR Congo	DF	2017–2019	76	0	
Kevin Maher	Republic of Ireland	DF	2008, 2009–2011	76	0	
Peter Beadle	England	FW	1988–1992	76	15	
Joe Jacques	England	MF	1972–1975	76	1	
Alex Forbes	Scotland	MF	1932–1935	76	1	
Tom Thompson	England	DF	1920–1924	76	2	
Rory Donnelly	Northern Ireland	FW	2015–2017	75	12	
Leo Fortune-West	England	FW	1995–1998	75	22	
Keith Lindsey	England	DF	1972–1975	75	5	
George Hebden	England	GK	1927–1929	75	0	
Oliver Hawkins	England	FW/DF	2023–2025	74	8	
Thomas O'Connor	Republic of Ireland	DF	2019–2021	74	1	
Matt Lawrence	England	DF	2010–2012	73	0	
Colin Powell	England	FW	1981–1983	73	2	
Gordon Brown	Scotland	FW	1959–1961	73	13	
Alex Ferguson	Scotland	GK	1925–1927	73	0	
James Robertson	unknown	DF/GK	1899–1901	73	0	
Timothee Dieng	France	DF	2023–2025	72	11	
Dick Doncaster	Wales	FW	1934–1936	72	19	
George Nicol	Scotland	FW	1932–1934	72	42	
Ernest Harvey	England	DF	1906–1908	72	1	
Armani Little	England	MF	2024–	71	7	
Dom Jefferies	Wales	MF	2022–2024	71	2	
Darren Byfield	England	FW	2004–2006	71	20	
Ronnie Waldock	England	FW	1961–1964	71	15	
Peter Godfrey	England	FW	1961–1965	71	10	
Doug Loft	England	MF	2014–2016	70	6	
Eliot Martin	England	DF	1991–1995	70	1	
Mickey Barker	England	DF	1978–1980	70	3	
Trevor Long	England	FW	1952–1955	70	16	
Richard Jackson	England	DF	1932–1934	70	0	
Jimmy White	England	DF	1963–1966	70	1	
John McGregor	England	DF	1930–1932	70	2	
John White	unknown	DF	1903–1905	70	3	
Ty Gooden	England	MF	1999–2002	69	7	
Paul Baker	England	FW	1992–1995	69	16	
Dave Wiltshire	England	DF	1973–1976	69	2	
Sam Gilligan	Scotland	FW	1913–1915	69	16	
Ade Akinbiyi	England	FW	1996–1998	68	29	
Larry Baxter	England	FW	1955–1957	68	7	
Sammy Meston	England	FW	1926–1928	68	9	
John MacDonald	unknown	FW	1898–1901	68	20	
Alf Meager	unknown	MF	1894–1898	68	1	
Sam Gale	England	DF	2021–2026	67	1	
Jermaine McGlashan	England	MF	2014–2016	67	7	
Arthur Read	England	DF	1922–1924	67	3	
Ernie Pinkney	Scotland	FW	1913–1915	67	13	
Joe Walton	England	DF	1904–1906	67	0	
Kyle Dempsey	England	MF	2020–2022	66	9	
Scott Wagstaff	England	MF	2016–2018	66	4	
Andy Frampton	England	DF	2011–2013	66	0	
Alan Pouton	England	MF	2003–2007	66	3	
Robbie Reinelt	England	FW	1993–1995	66	8	
Peter Heritage	England	FW	1989–1991	66	11	
Gary West	England	DF	1987–1989	66	3	
Bill Baldwin	England	FW	1934–1936	66	27	
David Tutonda	DR Congo	DF	2021–2023	65	0	
Deji Oshilaja	England	DF	2015–2016, 2016, 2016–2017	65	1	
Andy Thomson	Scotland	FW	1999–2001	65	22	
John Hodge	England	FW	1998–1900	65	2	
Scott Barrett	England	GK	1992–1995	65	0	
Bill White	Scotland	FW	1930–1932	65	18	
John Watson	Scotland	DF	1896–1899	65	2	
Shaun Williams	Republic of Ireland	MF	2022–2024	64	4	
Richard Rose	England	DF	2000–2006	64	0	
Ivan Haines	England	DF	1987–1991	64	0	
Bill Cockburn	England	DF	1960–1962	64	1	
Bill Burtenshaw	England	FW	1949–1952	64	21	
John Waugh	Scotland	DF	1920–1922	64	4	
Josh Andrews	England	FW	2024–2026	62	6	
Aaron Morris	Wales	DF	2014–2016	62	1	
Mark McCammon	Barbados	FW	2008–2011	62	5	
Bill Raisbeck	Scotland	MF	1902–1904	62	3	
Elliott Nevitt	England	FW	2024–2026	61	8	
Mikael Mandron	France	FW	2019–2021, 2022–2023	61	10	
Lewis Montrose	England	MF	2011–2013	61	6	
Luke Rooney	England	MF	2008–2012	61	6	
Gary Breen	Republic of Ireland	DF	1992–1994	61	0	
Charlie Crickmore	England	FW	1966–1968	61	17	
Charlie Burtenshaw	England	FW	1949–1952	61	10	
Charlie Gellatly	England	DF	1931–1934	61	0	
David Rogers	England	MF	1926–1928	61	0	
P. Glen	Scotland	FW	1912–1915	61	17	
Alf Milward	England	FW	1901–1903	61	19	
Stuart Lewis	England	MF	2008–2010	60	1	
Neil Smillie	England	FW	1993–1995	60	3	
Mark Dempsey	Republic of Ireland	FW	1990–1993	60	2	
Mark Cooper	England	FW	1987–1989	60	11	
Nigel Williams	England	DF	1976–1979	60	1	
Lew Collins	unknown	GK	1945–1948	60	0	
John Smith	unknown	MF	1937–1939	60	0	
Jonah Wilcox	England	FW	1927–1929	60	30	
Steven Gregory	England	MF	2013–2014	59	0	
John Shepherd	England	FW	1959–1961	59	26	
Bill Arblaster	England	FW	1926–1928	59	24	
Joe Gbodé	England	FW	2021–2025	58	4	
Josh Gowling	England	DF	2009–2011	58	4	
David Fry	England	GK	1983–1985	58	0	
George Francis	England	FW	1962–1964	58	21	
Bill McCurdy	Scotland	DF	1902–1904	58	0	
John Hills	England	DF	2003–2005	57	3	
Paul Collins	England	MF	1984–1987	57	4	
Frank McKee	Scotland	MF	1952–1955	57	0	
Fred Cheesmur	England	FW	1929–1930	57	21	
Arthur Dominy	England	FW	1928–1929	57	17	
Leonard Dowell	Scotland	FW	1927–1931	57	7	
Charlie Hafekost	England	FW	1912–1914	57	15	
Joe Satterthwaite	England	FW	1909–1911	57	19	
Lee Martin	England	DF	2016–2018	56	6	
Tommy Johnson	England	FW	2002–2005	56	9	
William Duncan	Scotland	FW	1935–1937	56	8	
Tommy Caldwell	unknown	FW	1912–1914	56	5	
Tom Nichols	England	FW	2023–2024	55	9	
Tommy Watson	Scotland	FW	1970–1972	55	9	
Trevor Lee	England	FW	1980–1983	54	14	
Joe Durrell	England	FW	1975–1977	54	9	
Terry Parmenter	England	FW	1971–1973	54	0	
Reginald Neal	England	FW	1937–1938	54	4	
Fred Griffiths	Wales	GK	1904–1906	54	0	
John Bradbury	England	FW	1902–1904	54	2	
George Seeley	England	FW	1899–1901	54	8	
Kevin James	England	FW	2000–2004	53	4	
Dave Puttnam	England	FW	1995–1997	53	3	
George Burley	Scotland	DF	1988–1989	53	2	
Ron Saunders	England	FW	1957–1959	53	26	
George Purcell	England	FW	1932–1934	53	20	
Regan Charles-Cook	England	MF	2018–2020	52	6	
Emmanuel Osadebe	Republic of Ireland	MF	2015–2017	52	3	
Brian Clarke	England	DF	1988–1992	52	0	
Pat Gavin	England	FW	1988–1989	52	8	
Pat Walker	Republic of Ireland	FW	1977–1981	52	3	
Bill Collins	Northern Ireland	MF	1949–1951	52	1	
Bert Williams	Wales	FW	1931–1932, 1933–1935	52	7	
John Tatton	unknown	FW	1913–1915	52	2	
Jordan Graham	England	MF	2020, 2020–2021	51	13	
Dominic Samuel	England	FW	2015–2016, 2020–2021	51	13	
Liburd Henry	Dominica	FW	1992–1994	51	5	
Garry Kimble	England	FW	1989–1991	51	0	
Jimmy McVeigh	England	DF	1970–1972	51	1	
Derek Lewis	England	FW	1950–1952	51	32	
Jim McAlpine	Scotland	MF	1921–1923	51	0	
Albert Sutherland	England	DF	1909–1911	51	0	
Andy Smith	England	DF	2025–	50	1	
Bill Patrick	Scotland	FW	1958–1960	50	15	
Brent Sancho	Trinidad and Tobago	DF	2005–2007	50	2	
Bill Patrick	Scotland	FW	1958–1960	50	15	
Freddie Kingshott	England	GK	1955–1957	50	0	
Wally Akers	unknown	FW	1946–1948	50	23	
C.W. Johns	unknown	FW	1910–1920	50	6	
C.H. Arthurs	unknown	MF	1908–1911	50	5	
Dan Pellatt	unknown	MF	1894–1897	50	4	

== See also ==
- List of Gillingham F.C. players (25–49 appearances)
- List of Gillingham F.C. players (1–24 appearances)
