= 1934–35 Gillingham F.C. season =

English football club season

Gillingham
1934–35 season
- Chairman: Jack Knight
- Manager: Fred Mavin
- Third Division South: 20th
- FA Cup: First round
- Third Division South Cup: First round
- Top goalscorer: League: Bill Baldwin (13); All: Bill Baldwin (13)
- Highest home attendance: 9,233 vs Coventry City (26 December 1934)
- Lowest home attendance: 1,000 vs Luton Town (26 September 1934)
Home colours

During the 1934–35 English football season, Gillingham F.C. competed in the Football League Third Division South, the third tier of the English football league system. It was the 15th season in which Gillingham competed in the Football League. Gillingham won two of their first four games of the season but then won only once in the next eleven league games; they were in 18th place out of 22 teams in the league table at the end of November. During a match on 1 December, Gillingham's Sim Raleigh suffered a head injury and died later that day. The team ended 1934 with five consecutive defeats during which they conceded 24 goals. After only winning 4 out of 22 games between August and December, Gillingham performed better in the second half of the campaign, with 7 victories in 20 games between January and May. An unbeaten run of seven games during March and April helped ensure that they finished the season in 20th place, avoiding by one place the need to apply for re-election to the league for the following season.

Gillingham competed in two knock-out competitions but were eliminated in the first round of both the FA Cup and the Third Division South Cup. The team played 44 competitive matches, winning 11, drawing 13 and losing 20. Bill Baldwin was the club's top goalscorer with 13 goals, all scored in the league. Fred Lester made the most appearances, playing in all 44 games. The highest attendance recorded at the club's home ground, Priestfield Road, during the season was 9,233 for a league match against Coventry City on 26 December 1934.

== Background and pre-season ==
Fred Mavin (pictured in 1912, during his playing days) was the team's manager.

The 1934–35 season was Gillingham's 15th season playing in the third and lowest level of the Football League. The club had been among the founder members of the Football League Third Division in 1920, which featured only southern teams and was renamed the Third Division South a year later when a parallel Third Division North was created. In Gillingham's 14 seasons in this division, the team had consistently struggled, only finishing in the top half of the league table twice. They had finished in the bottom two places on four occasions, requiring them each time to apply for re-election to the League, most recently in the 1931–32 season. In the 1933–34 season they had finished in 17th place out of 22 teams.

Fred Mavin was the team's manager, a post he had held since 1932. Alan Ure served as team trainer. There was some turnover in the club's playing squad; Arthur Mills and Allan Scott, two of Gillingham's highest goalscorers during the previous season, both moved on, as did another forward, Fred Liddle. In their place, the club signed four new forwards: Wilf Crompton from Burnley, Bill Baldwin from Southport, Albert Orr from Torquay United, and Dick Doncaster from Reading. Joe Wiggins, a full-back, joined the club from Leicester City, and Harry Randle, a half-back, arrived from Southend United.

The team's first-choice kit was Gillingham's usual blue shirts and white shorts. Pre-season matches between Football League members were not permitted at the time, and clubs instead generally prepared for the season with a public trial match between two teams chosen from within their own squad of players. Gillingham staged such a match in August and Doncaster and Orr were among the scorers as the "Blues" beat the "Reds".

== Third Division South ==
=== August–December ===
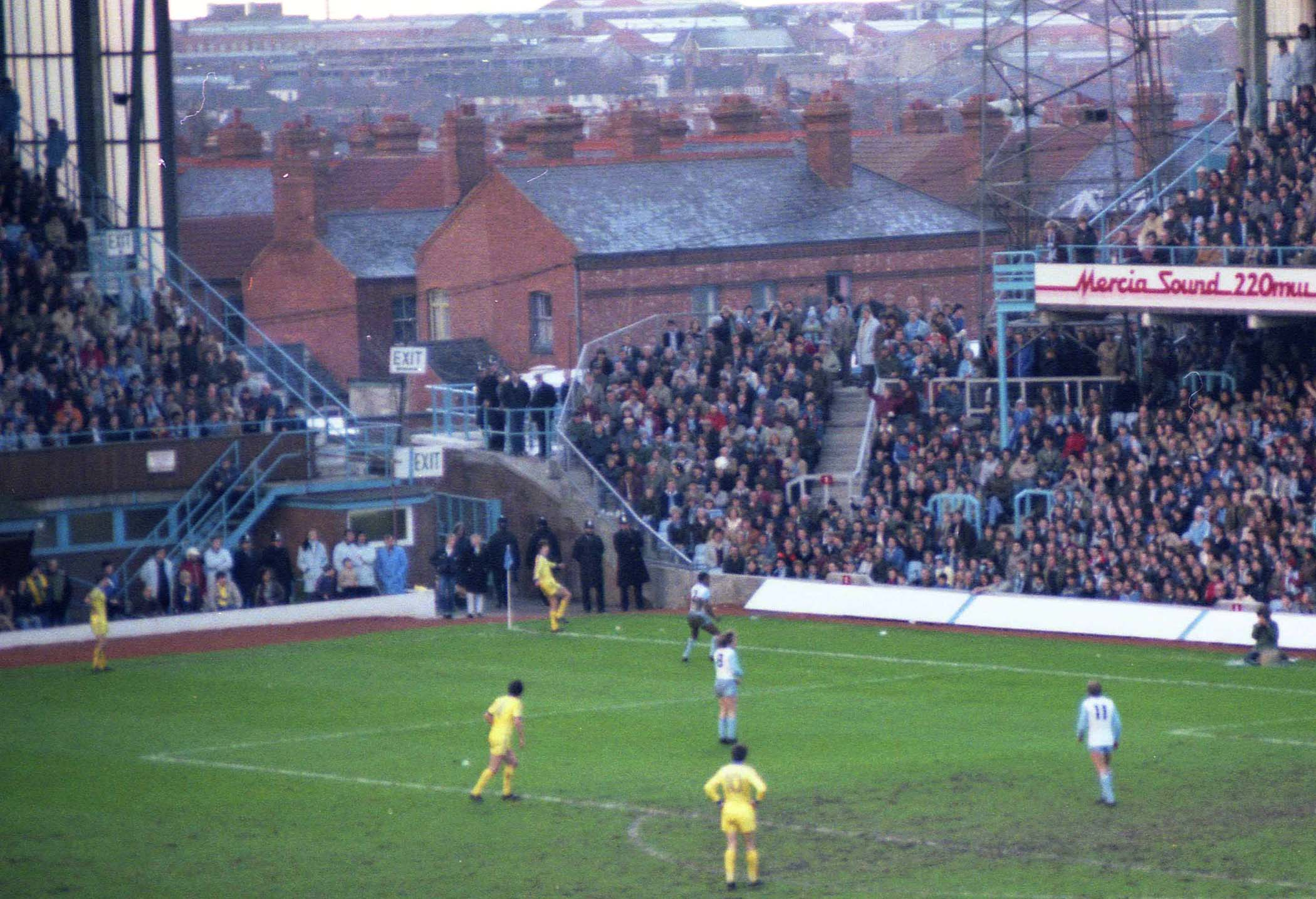
Gillingham lost on Christmas Day at Coventry City's Highfield Road ground (pictured in 1982).

Gillingham's first match of the season was at their own ground, Priestfield Road, against Torquay United; Wiggins, Crompton, Baldwin, Orr, and Doncaster all made their debuts for Gillingham. Sim Raleigh, Gillingham's highest goalscorer during the previous season, scored all the goals in a 3–0 victory; it was the only hat-trick scored by a Gillingham player during the season. Four days later, Randle made his debut against Millwall; Gillingham were hindered by playing into the wind and sun in the first half, and the glare contributed to George Barrie scoring an own goal as Millwall took a 2–0 lead before half-time and went on to win 3–1. Gillingham's first away game of the season resulted in a second consecutive defeat as they were beaten 3–0 by Reading. On 8 September, Crompton scored two goals as Gillingham beat Northampton Town 3–1 at Priestfield Road; it was the start of a run of seven games in which he scored a total of six goals. A week after the victory over Northampton, he scored to secure a 1–1 draw after Gillingham had fallen behind to Bournemouth & Boscombe Athletic, and he was on the scoresheet again on 17 September when Gillingham lost 3–2 away to Millwall. Despite creating the majority of the scoring chances, Gillingham lost 2–1 at home to Watford on 22 September; in the closing minutes Gillingham could have been awarded a penalty kick when one of Watford's full-backs cleared the ball from the goal line with his hand, but the referee failed to notice the infringement. A 2–2 draw with Newport County on 29 September, in which Crompton scored again, meant that Gillingham were in 16th place out of 22 teams in the Third Division South league table at the end of the month.

Gillingham ended a four-game winless run by beating Exeter City on 6 October; Barrie scored the first goal and provided the final pass for Raleigh to score the other. A week later, Crompton gave his team the lead over Bristol City in the first minute, but Gillingham conceded three goals in the second half and lost the game. Following a goalless draw at home to Queens Park Rangers in what the Daily Herald described as a "game of missed chances", Gillingham lost 2–0 away to Crystal Palace. In the team's first game of November, a goal from Raleigh secured a 1–1 draw at home to Aldershot. On 10 November, Gillingham lost 3–0 away to Swindon Town, meaning that they had scored only one goal in their last four matches. The match was the final Gillingham appearance for Crompton, the team's joint top scorer for the season up to this point; later in the month he was transferred to Luton Town after just 14 appearances for Gillingham. Doncaster, who had not played since September, replaced him for the next game, against Southend United, and scored his team's first goal in a 2–2 draw; Fred Cheesmur, a former Gillingham player, scored both of Southend's goals. At the end of the month, Gillingham were in 19th place in the league table.

On 1 December, Gillingham played at home to Brighton & Hove Albion in a match which finished 0–0. Early in the game, Raleigh and a Brighton player clashed heads while both jumping for the ball. Raleigh played on but collapsed during the second half; he was taken to a nearby hospital but died during the evening. An inquest took place shortly afterwards which attributed the death to a haemorrhage and recorded a verdict of accidental death. A week after Raleigh's death, Gillingham beat Cardiff City 2–0 to achieve their first victory for more than two months, but they then ended 1934 with five consecutive defeats, in which they conceded a total of 24 goals. The run began on 15 December with a 6–3 defeat at home to Charlton Athletic, who were top of the league table going into the game; it was the first time Gillingham had conceded as many goals in a match since the previous December. Against Bristol Rovers on 22 December, Gillingham fell 3–1 behind but scoring twice to bring the scores level; they conceded a fourth goal and lost the game. Gillingham played Coventry City on both 25 and 26 December; at the time it was traditional for teams in the Football League to play home and away matches against the same opponents on the two days. On Christmas Day, Gillingham were beaten 4–0 at Coventry's Highfield Road ground; the Birmingham Gazette reported that Gillingham had James Harvey, their goalkeeper, to thank for the fact that they were not defeated by a wider margin. The teams met again at Priestfield Road on Boxing Day and Coventry scored three early goals and eventually won 5–2. Gillingham's final match of 1934 ended in a 5–0 defeat to Torquay United; the result meant that at the end of the calendar year Gillingham were in 20th place in the league table.

=== January–May ===
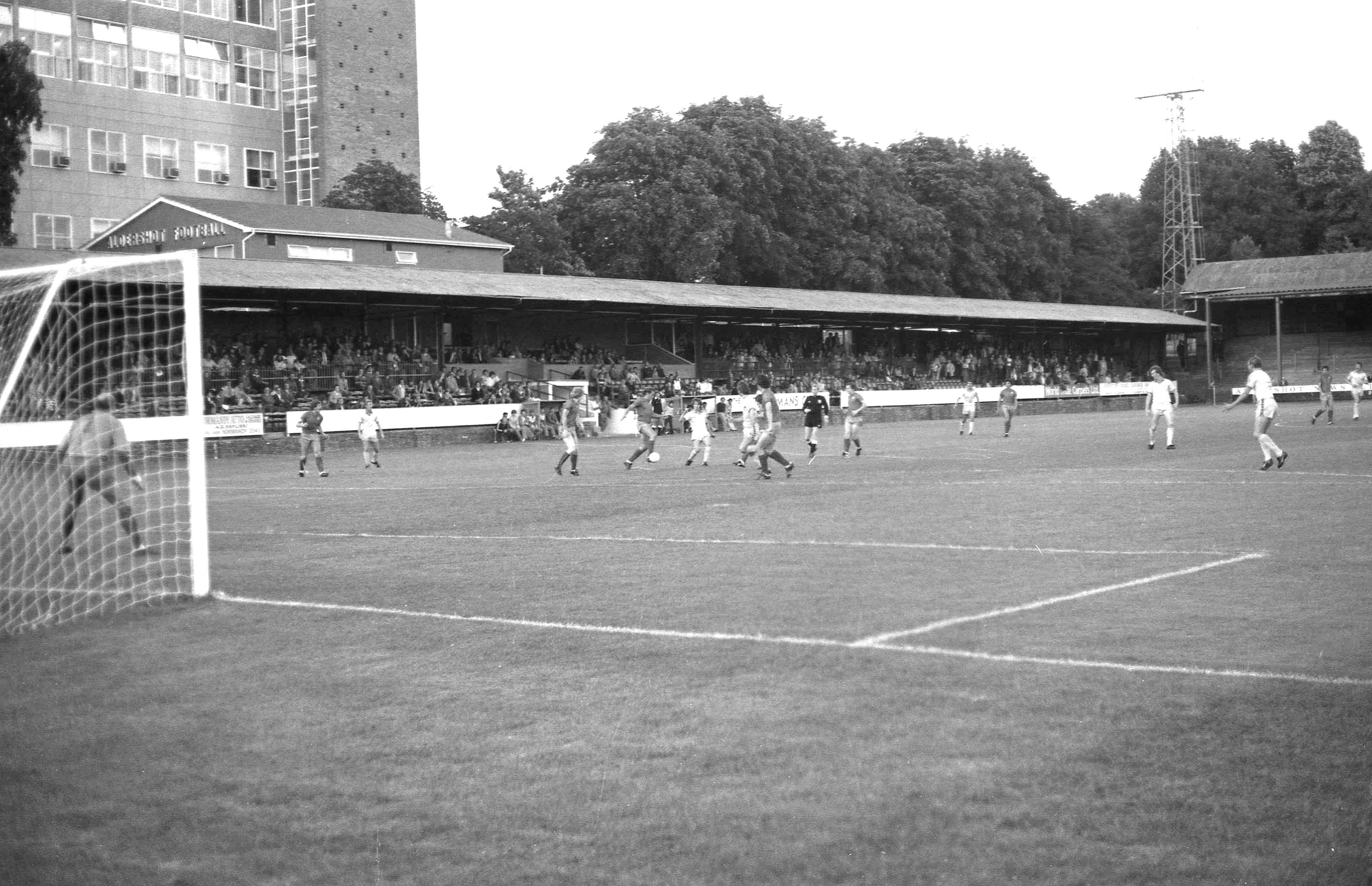
Gillingham lost heavily in March at the Recreation Ground (pictured in 1982), the home of Aldershot.

Gillingham ended their run of defeats in their first game of 1935 with a 1–1 draw at home to Reading, but followed this with a 2–1 defeat away to Northampton Town two weeks later. The match was the first of a run in which Gillingham alternated between away defeats and home victories over ten games. In their final game of January, Gillingham won a match at Priestfield Road for the first time in nearly four months, beating Bournemouth & Boscombe Athletic 3–1. Hugh Vallance, who had left the club in 1932, scored the opening goal in his first appearance after re-joining Gillingham days earlier. Roy Bethell and Doncaster added to Gillingham's lead before their opponents scored a late consolation goal. In their first match of February, Gillingham lost 3–1 away to Watford, a result which took Watford up to 2nd place in the league table but meant that Gillingham were now in the bottom two places. Gillingham rebounded in their next game, achieving their highest-scoring victory of the season when they beat fellow strugglers Newport County 5–0 at Priestfield Road. The game was goalless at half-time but, in what the Western Mail called an "extraordinary reversal", Gillingham's forwards dominated the game in the second period, scoring twice within five minutes of the restart and adding three further goals before the end of the match. Doncaster scored one goal and set up three more. A week later, Gillingham lost 2–0 away to Exeter City, but they ended February with a 1–0 home victory over Bristol City.

The team's contrasting performances at home and away continued in early March. In the first match of the month, they lost 2–0 away to Queens Park Rangers, but a week later they beat Crystal Palace by the same score at Priestfield Road; Doncaster scored a goal direct from a corner kick, assisted by a strong wind, and Baldwin added a second late in the game to complete the victory. On 16 March, Gillingham suffered their heaviest defeat since December as they lost 4–1 away to Aldershot. After the home team took the lead, Doncaster scored an equaliser almost immediately, but Aldershot scored twice more before half-time. The Daily Herald reported that Gillingham "showed great dash" in the second period, but their opponents' defence was too strong for them and Aldershot added a fourth goal late in the game. Having previously failed to go more than three consecutive games without defeat at any point since the start of the season, Gillingham began an unbeaten run of seven games with a 2–0 victory at home to Swindon Town on 23 March, which they followed with four consecutive draws. In their final match of March, they held Southend United to a goalless draw, the first time since before Christmas that they had played an away game and not been defeated.

Gillingham began April with a home game against Luton Town, who were in third place in the league table going into the match. Baldwin gave his team the lead but Luton equalised and the game finished 1–1. It was the final Gillingham appearance for George Kidd, who was transferred to Luton days later. A week later, Gillingham drew 1–1 away to Brighton & Hove Albion, the first time all season that they had played two consecutive away games without defeat. On 19 April, Gillingham achieved their fourth consecutive draw, the game with Clapton Orient finishing 2–2. They extended their unbeaten run to seven matches with consecutive 1–0 victories over Cardiff City, and Clapton Orient. The unbeaten run had lifted Gillingham to 18th place in the league table, but they slipped back to 20th place after a 2–0 defeat away to Charlton Athletic on 27 April, a result which clinched the championship of the division for Charlton. Gillingham's penultimate game of the season was away to Luton Town; Bethell and Baldwin gave Gillingham a 2–0 lead but they then conceded two goals and the game ended in a draw, meaning that Gillingham ended the season having won only once in 21 league games away from home. Three days later, they ended the season with a 1–1 draw at home to Bristol Rovers. The away team took an early lead but Harry Anstiss scored an equaliser. Gillingham were subsequently awarded two penalty kicks, one of which had to be retaken because of an infringement, but they missed the target with all three kicks. The result meant that they finished the season 20th in the league table, avoiding the need to apply for re-election by one place.

=== Match details ===
Key

- In result column, Gillingham's score shown first
- H = Home match
- A = Away match
- pen. = Penalty kick
- o.g. = Own goal

Results

Date	Opponents	Result	Goalscorers	Attendance
25 August 1934	Torquay United (H)	3–0	Raleigh (3)	8,128
29 August 1934	Millwall (H)	1–3	Forsyth (o.g.)	8,669
1 September 1934	Reading (A)	0–3		9,681
8 September 1934	Northampton Town (H)	3–1	Raleigh, Crompton (2)	6,938
15 September 1934	Bournemouth & Boscombe Athletic (A)	1–1	Crompton	6,208
17 September 1934	Millwall (A)	2–3	Crompton, Anstiss	8,877
22 September 1934	Watford (H)	1–2	Doncaster (pen.)	4,404
29 September 1934	Newport County (A)	2–2	Crompton, Williams	5,460
6 October 1934	Exeter City (H)	2–1	Barrie, Raleigh	6,064
13 October 1934	Bristol City (A)	1–3	Crompton	9,862
20 October 1934	Queens Park Rangers (H)	0–0		5,898
27 October 1934	Crystal Palace (A)	0–2		12,942
3 November 1934	Aldershot (H)	1–1	Raleigh	4,863
10 November 1934	Swindon Town (A)	0–3		5,289
17 November 1934	Southend United (H)	2–2	Doncaster, Baldwin	4,168
1 December 1934	Brighton & Hove Albion (H)	0–0		4,115
8 December 1934	Cardiff City (A)	2–0	Varty, Syred	8,463
15 December 1934	Charlton Athletic (H)	3–6	Varty, Randle (pen.), Baldwin	5,101
22 December 1934	Bristol Rovers (A)	3–4	Baldwin (2), Randle (pen.)	7,270
25 December 1934	Coventry City (A)	0–4		24,226
26 December 1934	Coventry City (H)	2–5	Bethell (2)	9,233
29 December 1934	Torquay United (A)	0–5		3,408
5 January 1935	Reading (H)	1–1	Baldwin	5,094
19 January 1935	Northampton Town (A)	1–2	Anstiss	3,783
26 January 1935	Bournemouth & Boscombe Athletic (H)	3–1	Vallance, Bethell, Doncaster	2,672
2 February 1935	Watford (A)	1–3	Baldwin	9,622
9 February 1935	Newport County (H)	5–0	Doncaster, Baldwin (2), Vallance, Anstiss	3,689
16 February 1935	Exeter City (A)	0–2		4,220
23 February 1935	Bristol City (H)	1–0	Anstiss	4,713
2 March 1935	Queens Park Rangers (A)	0–2		8,157
9 March 1935	Crystal Palace (H)	2–0	Doncaster, Baldwin	2,712
16 March 1935	Aldershot (A)	1–4	Doncaster^{[b]}	3,515
23 March 1935	Swindon Town (H)	2–0	Baldwin, Vallance	3,796
30 March 1935	Southend United (A)	0–0		5,936
6 April 1935	Luton Town (H)	1–1	Baldwin	4,139
13 April 1935	Brighton & Hove Albion (A)	1–1	Doncaster	5,227
19 April 1935	Clapton Orient (A)	2–2	Doncaster, Baldwin	8,131
20 April 1935	Cardiff City (H)	1–0	Anstiss	5,820
22 April 1935	Clapton Orient (H)	1–0	Doncaster	7,034
27 April 1935	Charlton Athletic (A)	0–2		13,782
1 May 1935	Luton Town (A)	2–2	Bethell, Baldwin	3,996
4 May 1935	Bristol Rovers (H)	1–1	Anstiss	3,815

=== Partial league table ===
Football League Third Division South final table, bottom positions
Pos	Team	Pld	W	D	L	GF	GA	GAv	Pts	
19	Cardiff City	42	13	9	20	62	82	0.756	35	
20	Gillingham	42	11	13	18	55	757	0.073	35	
21	Southend United	42	11	9	22	65	78	0.833	31	Required to apply for re-election
22	Newport County	42	10	5	27	54	112	0.482	25	Required to apply for re-election

== Cup matches ==
=== FA Cup ===
As a Third Division South club, Gillingham entered the 1934–35 FA Cup in the first round; they were paired with fellow Third Division South team Bristol City. After a goalless first half, Gillingham fell 1–0 behind early in the second period; they had a chance to equalise when they were awarded a penalty kick but Fred Lester missed. Bristol City then scored a second goal and Gillingham lost the match 2–0 and were eliminated from the competition at the earliest stage.

==== Match details ====
Key

- In result column, Gillingham's score shown first
- H = Home match
- A = Away match
- pen. = Penalty kick
- o.g. = Own goal

Results

Date	Round	Opponents	Result	Goalscorers	Attendance
24 November 1934	First	Bristol City (A)	0–2		10,055

=== Third Division South Cup ===
Gillingham entered the 1934–35 Third Division South Cup, a knock-out tournament exclusively for the teams in that division, in the first round; their opponents were Luton Town. The match drew an attendance reported at 1,000, by far the smallest crowd of the season at Priestfield Road. Gillingham took the lead in the first half but had to play the entire second period with only ten men after Harry Marsden was injured.^{[a]} Luton scored three times in the second half to win and eliminate Gillingham from the competition.

==== Match details ====
Key

- In result column, Gillingham's score shown first
- H = Home match
- A = Away match
- pen. = Penalty kick
- o.g. = Own goal

Results

Date	Round	Opponents	Result	Goalscorers	Attendance
26 September 1934	First	Luton Town (H)	1–3	Williams	1,000

== Players ==
Harry Anstiss made 34 appearances.

During the season, 24 players made at least one appearance for Gillingham. Lester made the most, playing in every one of the team's 44 matches; no other player made more than 37 appearances. Two players took part in fewer than five matches. Baldwin was the team's top goalscorer with 13 goals, all recorded in league matches; no other player scored more than nine times.

Player statistics
Player	Position	Third Division South		FA Cup		Third Division South Cup		Total	
Player	Position	Apps	Goals	Apps	Goals	Apps	Goals	Apps	Goals
Harry Anstiss	FW	33	6	1	0	0	0	34	6
Leslie Balcombe	FW	12	0	0	0	0	0	12	0
Bill Baldwin	FW	32	13	1	0	1	0	34	13
George Barrie	HB	31	1	0	0	1	0	32	1
Roy Bethell	FW	26	4	1	0	0	0	27	4
Wilf Crompton	FW	14	6	0	0	1	0	15	6
Dick Doncaster	FW	32	9	0	0	0	0	32	9
Alex Forbes	HB	4	0	0	0	0	0	4	0
James Harvey	GK	15	0	1	0	1	0	17	0
Tom Holland	GK	27	0	0	0	0	0	27	0
Tom Hopkins	HB	12	0	0	0	0	0	12	0
George Kidd	FW	35	0	1	0	1	0	37	0
Fred Lester	FW	42	0	1	0	1	0	44	0
Harry Marsden	FB	31	0	1	0	1	0	33	0
George Nicol	FW	3	0	0	0	0	0	3	0
Albert Orr	FW	12	0	0	0	0	0	12	0
Sim Raleigh	FW	15	6	1	0	1	0	17	6
Harry Randle	HB	32	2	1	0	1	0	34	2
Charlie Robinson	HB	11	0	1	0	0	0	12	0
Thomas Syred	FW	8	1	0	0	1	0	9	1
Hugh Vallance	FW	5	3	0	0	0	0	5	3
William Varty	FW	10	2	1	0	0	0	11	2
Joe Wiggins	FB	12	0	0	0	0	0	12	0
Bert Williams	FW	8	1	0	0	1	1	9	2

FW = Forward, HB = Half-back, GK = Goalkeeper, FB = Full-back

== Aftermath ==
Following the season, there was again some turnover in the club's playing squad, especially the forwards, as Anstiss, Bethell, and Crompton all moved on. In their place, Gillingham signed George Tadman, who would go on to be the team's leading goalscorer in the 1935–36 season, Jimmy Watson, and William Duncan. Gillingham's performances improved over the subsequent two seasons; the team finished the 1935–36 season in 16th place and a year later they ended the season in the top half of the table, finishing 11th. Mavin resigned from his position as manager at the conclusion of the 1936–37 season; Ure took his place, but under his management Gillingham finished the 1937–38 season in last place in the table and were therefore again required to apply for re-election. They received fewer votes in the ballot than Ipswich Town, who had applied to join the Third Division South from the Southern League, and thus lost their place in the Football League. After playing non-League football either side of the Second World War, Gillingham were elected back into the Football League in 1950 when the two Third Divisions were expanded from 22 to 24 clubs each.

== Footnotes ==
a. The concept of substitutes was not introduced to English football until the 1960s; previously, an injured player had to play on or else the team had to continue with a reduced number of players.
b. The Definitive Gillingham F.C.: A Complete Record by Tony Brown lists Baldwin as the scorer of this goal, but multiple contemporary newspaper reports credit Doncaster.
