= Fred Lester =

Fred Lester may refer to:

- Fred Lester (Australian footballer) (1902–1959), Australian rules footballer
- Fred Lester (footballer, born 1911) (1911–1974), English footballer
- Fred Faulkner Lester (1926–1945), United States Navy hospital corpsman and Medal of Honor recipient
