= Gellatly =

Gellatly is a surname. Notable people with the surname include:

- Charlie Gellatly (1910–1973), British footballer
- Jessie Gellatly (1882–1935), British medical doctor
- Jim Gellatly (born 1968), Scottish radio presenter and DJ
- John Gellatly (1853–1931), American art collector and patron
- John Arthur Gellatly (1869–1963), American politician
- Stephen Gellatly (born 1980), New Zealand cricketer
