= Herbert Randle =

Herbert Randle may refer to:

- Harry Randle (Herbert Clarence Randle), English footballer
- Herbert Niel Randle, professor of philosophy and writer on Indian philosophy
