= David Wiltshire =

David Wiltshire may refer to:

- David L Wiltshire, professor of theoretical physics
- Dave Wiltshire (born 1954), English footballer

== See also ==
- David Wilshire (1943–2023), British politician
