= Tony Weston =

Tony Weston may refer to two English footballers:

- Tony Weston (footballer, born 1946), former Gillingham F.C. player
- Tony Weston (footballer, born 2003), current Derby County player
