= Arthur Read (disambiguation) =

Arthur Read is a character in the animated television series Arthur.

Arthur Read may also refer to:

- Arthur Read (footballer, born 1894) (1894–?), English footballer
- Arthur Read (footballer, born 1999), English footballer
- Arthur Read (rugby league), see 1946 New Zealand rugby league season

== See also ==
- Arthur Reade (1902–1971), British labour movement activist
- Arthur Reed (disambiguation)
- Arthur Reid (disambiguation)
