= Arblaster =

Arblaster is a surname. Notable people with the surname include:

- Bill Arblaster (1892–1959), English footballer
- David Arblaster (1929–2006), Australian politician
- Julie Arblaster, Australian meteorologist and climatologist
- Ollie Arblaster (born 2004), English footballer
- Robert Arblaster (born 1948), New Zealand cricketer
