= Graham Knight =

Graham Knight may refer to:

- Graham Knight (footballer, born 1952), English former professional footballer
- Graham Knight (broadcaster) (1949–2009), British broadcaster, journalist and author
- Graham Knight (Australian footballer) (1931–2026), Australian rules football player for Fitzroy
- Graham Knight (musician) (born 1943), British musician, member of Marmalade
