= Trevor Long =

Trevor Long may refer to:

- Trevor Long (footballer)
- Trevor Long (actor)
