= 1923–24 Plunket Shield season =

Cricket tournament in New Zealand

1923–24 Plunket Shield
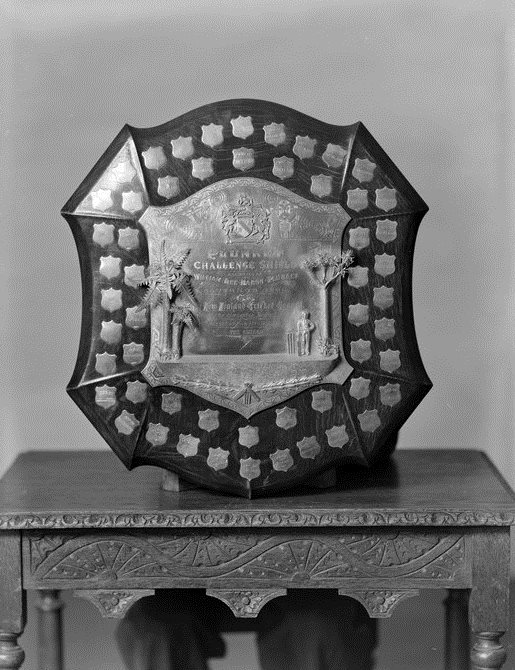
- The Plunket Shield trophy
- Cricket format: First-class
- Tournament format(s): Round-robin
- Champions: Wellington (1st title)
- Participants: 4
- Matches: 6

The 1923–24 Plunket Shield season was a tournament of the Plunket Shield, the domestic first-class cricket competition of New Zealand.

Wellington won the championship, finishing at the top of the points table at the end of the round-robin tournament between four first-class sides, Auckland, Canterbury, Otago and Wellington.

== Table ==
Below are the Plunket Shield standings for the 1923–24 season:

Team	Played	Won	Lost	Drawn	NetRpW
Wellington	3	3	0	0	10.844
Auckland	3	2	1	0	2.551
Otago	3	1	2	0	-1.433
Canterbury	3	0	3	0	-10.986
