= 1972–73 Plunket Shield season =

Cricket tournament in New Zealand

1972–73 Plunket Shield
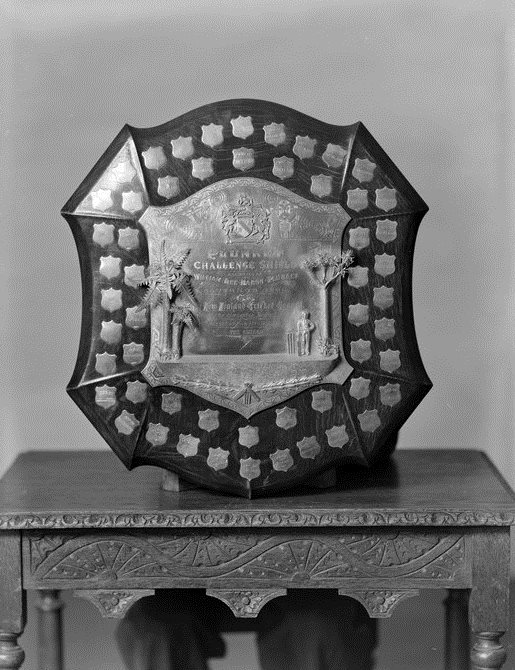
- The Plunket Shield trophy
- Cricket format: First-class
- Tournament format(s): Round-robin
- Champions: Wellington (13th title)
- Participants: 6
- Matches: 15

The 1972–73 Plunket Shield season was a tournament of the Plunket Shield, the domestic first-class cricket competition of New Zealand.

Wellington won the championship, finishing at the top of the points table at the end of the round-robin tournament between the six first-class sides, Auckland, Canterbury, Central Districts, Northern Districts, Otago and Wellington. Ten points were awarded for a win with one bonus point for every 25 runs over 150 and for every 2 wickets taken (in the first 65 overs only).

== Table ==
Below are the Plunket Shield standings for the season:

Team	Played	Won	Lost	Drawn	Bonus points		Points	Net RpW
Team	Played	Won	Lost	Drawn	Batting	Bowling	Points	Net RpW
Wellington	5	3	0	2	16	18	64	6.769
Auckland	5	3	1	1	13	20	63	4.439
Canterbury	5	2	2	1	18	23	61	6.899
Otago	5	2	2	1	15	12	47	-4.615
Central Districts	5	1	2	2	10	17	37	-3.737
Northern Districts	5	0	4	1	7	17	24	-11.219
