= 1949–50 Plunket Shield season =

Cricket tournament in New Zealand

1949–50 Plunket Shield
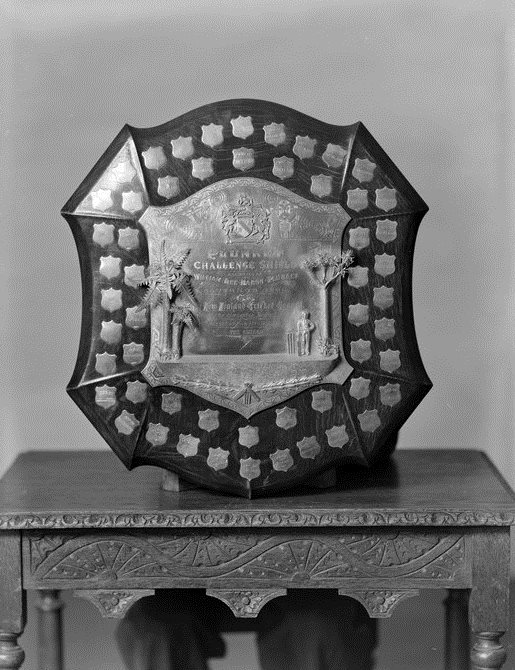
- The Plunket Shield trophy
- Cricket format: First-class
- Tournament format(s): Round-robin
- Champions: Wellington (7th title)
- Participants: 4
- Matches: 6

The 1949–50 Plunket Shield season was a tournament of the Plunket Shield, the domestic first-class cricket competition of New Zealand.

Wellington won the championship, finishing at the top of the points table at the end of the round-robin tournament between the four first-class sides, Auckland, Canterbury, Otago and Wellington. Eight points were awarded for a win, four points for having a first innings lead in a draw and two points for a first innings deficit in a draw.

== Table ==
Below are the Plunket Shield standings for the season:

Team	Played	Won	Lost	Drawn	Points	NetRpW
Wellington	3	2	1	0	16	4.394
Canterbury	3	1	1	1	10	-3.440
Auckland	3	1	1	1	10	-6.558
Otago	3	0	1	2	8	2.643
