= 1965–66 Plunket Shield season =

Cricket tournament in New Zealand

1965–66 Plunket Shield
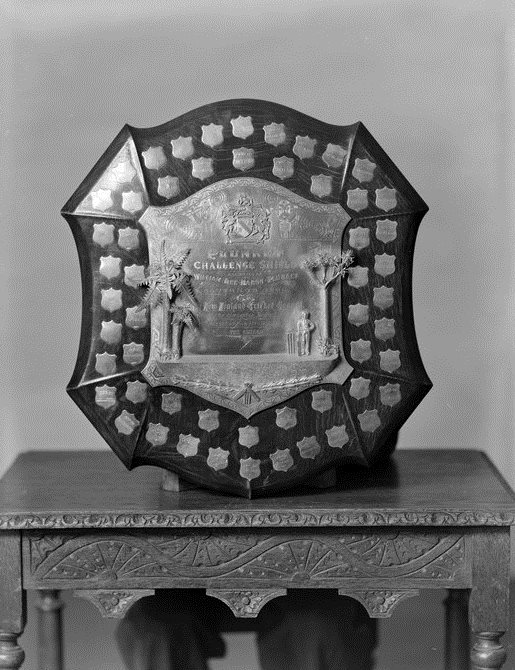
- The Plunket Shield trophy
- Cricket format: First-class
- Tournament format(s): Round-robin
- Champions: Wellington (12th title)
- Participants: 6
- Matches: 15

The 1965–66 Plunket Shield season was a tournament of the Plunket Shield, the domestic first-class cricket competition of New Zealand.

Wellington won the championship, finishing at the top of the points table at the end of the round-robin tournament between the six first-class sides, Auckland, Canterbury, Central Districts, Northern Districts, Otago and Wellington. Ten points were awarded for a win, five points for having a first innings lead in a draw, three points for having a first innings lead in a loss and one point for a first innings deficit in a draw.

== Table ==
Below are the Plunket Shield standings for the season:

Team	Played	Won	Lost	Drawn	Points	Net RpW
Wellington	5	3	0	2	40	8.516
Canterbury	5	2	0	3	31	1.831
Auckland	5	1	2	2	22	−1.019
Otago	5	1	1	3	21	−1.629
Central Districts	5	0	2	3	7	−4.909
Northern Districts	5	0	2	3	6	−2.399
