= Harry Anstiss =

English footballer

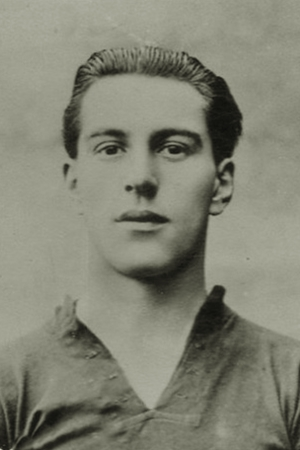
- Anstiss with Millwall in 1922.

Personal information
- Full name: Henry Augustus Anstiss
- Date of birth: 22 August 1899
- Place of birth: Hampstead, London
- Date of death: 9 March 1964 (aged 64)
- Place of death: Isleworth, London
- Height: 5 ft 9 1/2 in (1.77 m)
- Position: Inside forward

Youth career
- 1919–1920: Hammersmith Athletic

Senior career*
Years	Team	Apps	(Gls)
1920–1922	Brentford	42	(19)
1922–1923	Millwall	19	(3)
1923–1924	Watford	18	(5)
1924–1925	Rochdale	72	(39)
1926–1927	The Wednesday	12	(5)
1927–1931	Port Vale	109	(36)
1931–1932	Swansea Town	28	(6)
1932–1934	Crewe Alexandra	30	(7)
1934–1935	Gillingham	33	(6)
1935–1936	Tunbridge Wells Rangers		
1936–1937	Cray Wanderers		
Total		363+	(126+)
- * Club domestic league appearances and goals

Henry Augustus Anstiss (22 August 1899 – 9 March 1964) was a much-travelled English footballer who played as an inside-forward for Hammersmith Athletic, Brentford, Millwall, Watford, Rochdale, Sheffield Wednesday, Port Vale, Swansea Town, Crewe Alexandra, Gillingham, Tunbridge Wells Rangers and Cray Wanderers in the 1920s and 1930s. His most significant spell was with Port Vale, with whom he won the Third Division North title in 1929–30.

== Career ==
Anstiss played for Hammersmith Athletic, before joining Brentford, Millwall, Watford, Rochdale and The Wednesday, before joining Port Vale in February 1927, along with 'a substantial financial consideration' in exchange for Alfred Strange. Strange went on to become an England international. Anstiss did not head in the same direction. He had a great start to his Vale career, though, scoring on his debut at the Old Recreation Ground in a 6–2 win over Notts County on 26 February. He went on to score a hat-trick in a 7–1 home win over Fulham on 2 April and claimed 11 goals in 15 Second Division games in the 1926–27 campaign. This was the end of his purple patch, as he scored five goals in 32 games in the 1927–28 season. Injury brought him down in November 1928 and limited him to three goals in 17 matches in the 1928–29 relegation season. He scored 15 goals in 37 appearances in the 1929–30 season, as the "Valiants" were crowned champions of the Third Division North. He fell from favour in October 1930 and was limited to six goals in 17 games in the 1930–31 season. He was transferred to Swansea Town in May 1931. Later he played for Crewe Alexandra, Gillingham, Tunbridge Wells Rangers and Cray Wanderers.

== Personal life ==
Anstiss served as a Boy 1st Class in the Royal Navy during the First World War. Aged just 16, he saw action at the Battle of Jutland in 1916 and served on HMS Royal Oak. He joined the crew of HMS Powerful the following year.

== Career statistics ==
Appearances and goals by club, season and competition
Club	Season	Division	League		FA Cup		N/S Cup		Total	
Club	Season	Division	Apps	Goals	Apps	Goals	Apps	Goals	Apps	Goals
Brentford	1920–21	Third Division	19	4	0	0	—		19	4
Brentford	1921–22	Third Division South	23	15	2	0	—		25	15
Brentford	Total		42	19	2	0	0	0	44	19
Millwall	1922–23	Third Division South	19	3	0	0	0	0	19	3
Watford	1923–24	Third Division South	18	5	4	0	—		22	5
Rochdale	1924–25	Third Division North	42	23	2	0	—		45	23
Rochdale	1925–26	Third Division North	30	16	0	0	—		30	16
Rochdale	Total		72	39	2	0	0	0	74	39
The Wednesday	1926–27	First Division	12	5	0	0	—		12	5
Port Vale	1926–27	Second Division	15	11	0	0	—		15	11
Port Vale	1927–28	Second Division	29	3	3	2	—		32	5
Port Vale	1928–29	Second Division	17	3	0	0	—		17	3
Port Vale	1929–30	Third Division North	33	13	3	2	—		36	15
Port Vale	1930–31	Second Division	15	6	2	0	—		17	6
Port Vale	Total		109	36	8	4	0	0	117	40
Swansea Town	1931–32	Second Division	22	6	1	0	—		23	6
Swansea Town	1932–33	Second Division	6	0	0	0	—		6	0
Swansea Town	Total		28	6	1	0	0	0	29	6
Crewe Alexandra	1933–34	Third Division North	30	7	0	0	1	0	31	7
Gillingham	1934–35	Third Division South	33	6	1	0	0	0	34	6
Career total			363	126	18	4	1	0	382	130

== Honours ==
Port Vale

- Football League Third Division North: 1929–30
