= 1961–62 Plunket Shield season =

Cricket tournament in New Zealand

1961–62 Plunket Shield
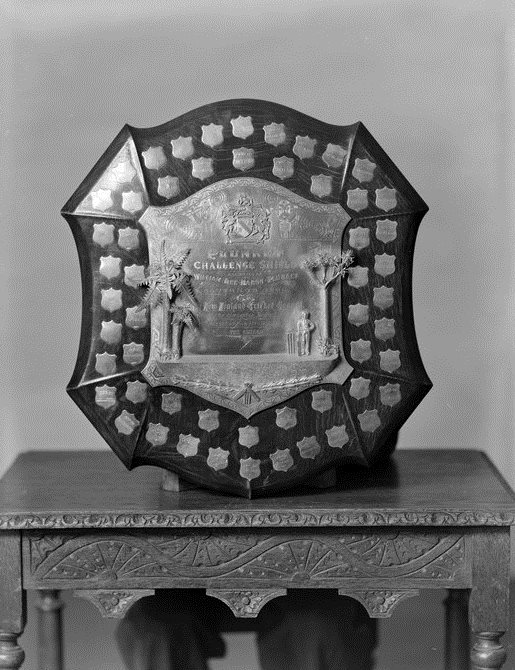
- The Plunket Shield trophy
- Cricket format: First-class
- Tournament format(s): Round-robin
- Champions: Wellington (11th title)
- Participants: 6
- Matches: 15

The 1961–62 Plunket Shield season was a tournament of the Plunket Shield, the domestic first-class cricket competition of New Zealand.

Wellington won the championship, finishing at the top of the points table at the end of the round-robin tournament between the six first-class sides, Auckland, Canterbury, Central Districts, Northern Districts, Otago and Wellington. Ten points were awarded for a win, five points for having a first-innings lead in a draw, three points for having a first-innings lead in a loss and one point for a first-innings deficit in a draw.

== Table ==
Below are the Plunket Shield standings for the season:

Team	Played	Won	Lost	Drawn	Points	Net RpW
Wellington	5	4	1	0	40	11.025
Auckland	5	3	1	1	35	3.321
Northern Districts	5	3	2	0	30	0.037
Central Districts	5	2	2	1	21	−4.974
Canterbury	5	1	3	1	18	−2.860
Otago	5	0	4	1	4	−9.593
