= Wellington cricket team =

New Zealand domestic cricket team

Wellington
- One Day name: Wellington Firebirds

Personnel
- Captain: Nick Kelly
- Coach: Shane Jurgensen

Team information
- Colors: KKR
- Founded: 1873
- Home ground: Basin Reserve
- Capacity: 11,600

History
- First-class debut: Auckland in 1873 at Wellington
- Plunket Shield wins: 22
- The Ford Trophy wins: 8
- Men's Super Smash wins: 4
- Official website: www.cricketwellington.co.nz

The Wellington Firebirds are one of six New Zealand men's first-class cricket teams that make up New Zealand Cricket. It is based in Wellington. It competes in the Plunket Shield first class (4-day) competition, The Ford Trophy domestic one day competition and the Men's Super Smash Twenty20 competition.

The Wellington Cricket Association was formed in 1875. It is New Zealand's oldest cricket association.

== Honours ==
- Plunket Shield (22):

1923–24, 1925–26, 1927–28, 1929–30, 1931–32, 1935–36, 1949–50, 1954–55, 1956–57, 1960–61, 1961–62, 1965–66, 1972–73, 1973–74, 1981–82, 1982–83, 1983–84, 1989–90, 2000–01, 2003–04, 2019–20, 2023–24.

- The Ford Trophy (8):

1973–74, 1974–75, 1981–82, 1988–89, 1990–91, 2001–02, 2013–14, 2018–19.

- Men's Super Smash (4):

2014–15, 2016–17, 2019–20, 2020–21.

== Grounds ==
Home games are usually played at the Basin Reserve ground in Wellington, which is also used by the Old Boys University rugby club during the winter. Wellington also occasionally use Wellington Regional Stadium for day/night matches, and play first-class games at Karori Park when the Basin Reserve is unavailable.

== Current squad ==
Based on squad for the 2023/24 season. Players in bold have international caps.

The Wellington Firebirds mascot looking out of the Don Neely Scoreboard at the Basin Reserve.

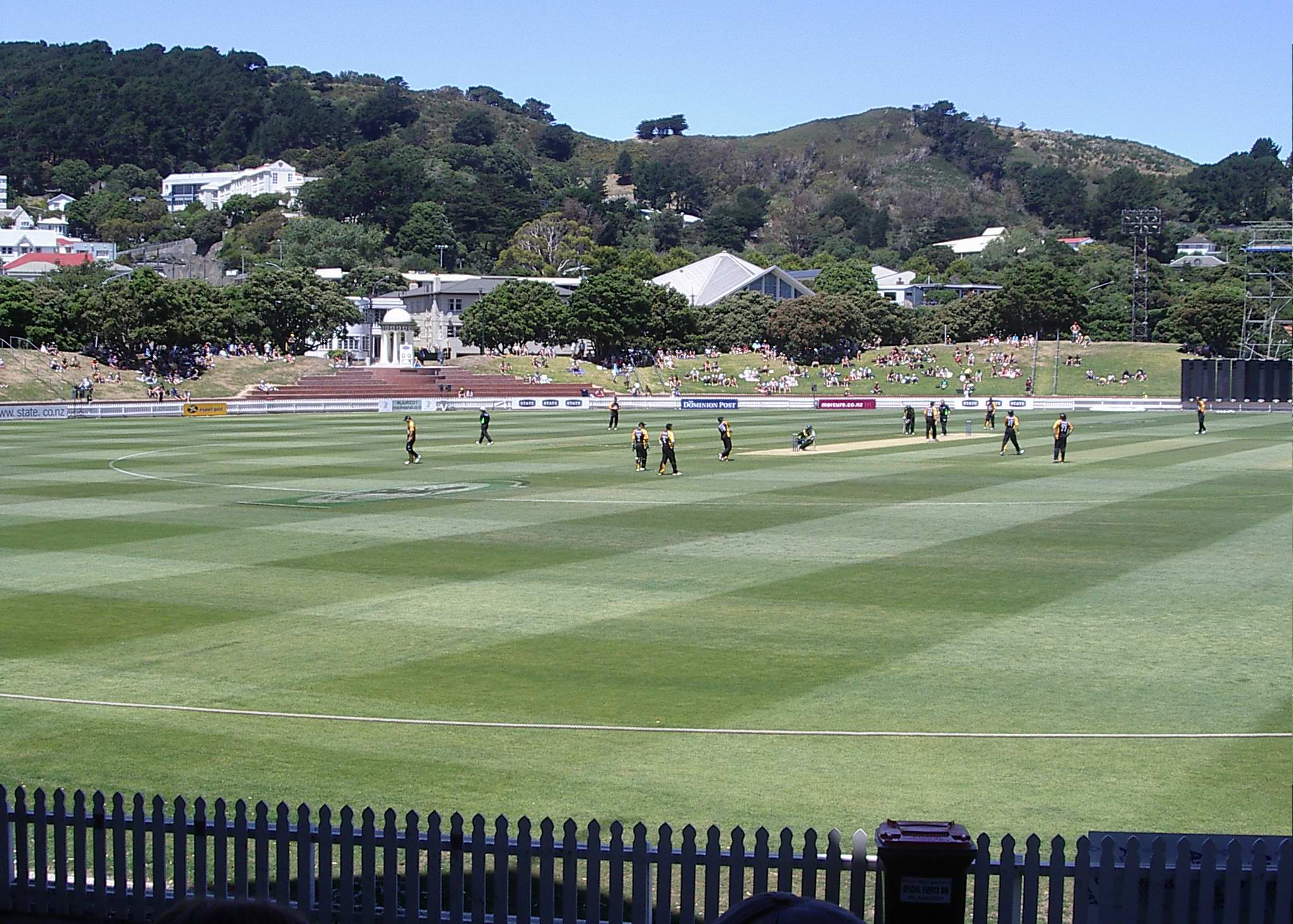
Match between the Firebirds and the Central Stags in 2008.

No.	Name	Nationality	Birth date	Batting style	Bowling style	Notes
Batters
2	Troy Johnson	New Zealand	1 October 1997 (age 29)	Right-handed	Right-arm off break	
4	**Muhammad Abbas**	New Zealand	29 November 2003 (age 22)	Right-handed	Left-arm medium-fast	
7	Tim Robinson	New Zealand	28 February 2002 (age 24)	Right-handed	Right-arm medium	
21	**Nick Greenwood**	Jersey	14 April 1999 (age 27)	Right-handed	Right-arm off break	
37	Gareth Severin	New Zealand	6 January 2000 (age 26)	Right-handed	Right-arm medium	
55	**Nick Kelly**	New Zealand	25 July 1993 (age 33)	Left-handed	Left-arm orthodox	
All-rounders
6	**Michael Bracewell**	New Zealand	14 February 1991 (age 35)	Left-handed	Right-arm off break	
9	**Rachin Ravindra**	New Zealand	18 November 1999 (age 26)	Left-handed	Left-arm off break	
17	Peter Younghusband	New Zealand	17 February 1990 (age 36)	Right-handed	Right arm leg break	
20	**Nathan Smith**	New Zealand	15 July 1998 (age 28)	Right-handed	Right arm medium-fast	
27	**Logan van Beek**	Netherlands	7 September 1990 (age 36)	Right-handed	Right-arm medium-fast	
41	Jesse Tashkoff	New Zealand	7 November 2000 (age 25)	Right-handed	Left-arm orthodox	
Wicket-keepers
36	**Tom Blundell**	New Zealand	1 September 1990 (age 36)	Right-handed	Right-arm off break	
57	Callum McLachlan	New Zealand	17 May 1999 (age 27)	Right-handed	—	
88	**Devon Conway**	New Zealand	8 July 1991 (age 35)	Left-handed	Right-arm medium	
Bowlers
11	**Adam Milne**	New Zealand	13 April 1992 (age 34)	Right-handed	Right arm fast	
13	Iain McPeake	New Zealand	24 May 1991 (age 35)	Right-handed	Right arm medium-fast	
14	**Ben Sears**	New Zealand	11 February 1998 (age 28)	Right-handed	Right-arm medium-fast	
83	Michael Snedden	New Zealand	20 September 1992 (age 34)	Right-handed	Right-arm medium-fast	
	James Hartshorn	New Zealand	28 September 1997 (age 29)	Right-handed	Right-arm medium-fast	

== Notable players ==
New Zealand

- Matthew Bell
- Bob Blair
- Graeme Wheeler (Reserve Bank Governor)
- Don Beard
- Ewen Chatfield
- Richard Collinge
- Jeremy Coney
- Martin Crowe
- Simon Doull
- Bruce Edgar
- Grant Elliott
- Stephen Fleming
- James Franklin
- Stephen Gellatly
- Evan Gray
- Paul Hitchcock
- Andrew Jones
- Richard Jones
- Gavin Larsen
- Ervin McSweeney
- Andrew Fletcher
- Lawrie Miller
- Bruce Murray
- Chris Nevin
- John Richard Reid
- Jesse Ryder
- Barry Sinclair
- Bruce Taylor
- Eric Tindill
- Roger Twose
- Robert Vance

England

- Paul Allott
- Charlie Shreck
- Graham Napier
- Scott Borthwick
- Jade Dernbach

Australia

- Clarrie Grimmett
- Bob Holland
- Travis Birt
- Brad Hodge

India

- Lakshmipathy Balaji
- Dhawal Kulkarni

Bangladesh

- Tamim Iqbal

Canada

- Ian Billcliff

Sri Lanka

- Muttiah Muralitharan

Zimbabwe

- Brendan Taylor

== Records ==
See List of New Zealand first-class cricket records.
