= Arthur Reid =

Arthur Reid may refer to:

- Arthur "Duke" Reid (1915–1975), Jamaican DJ
- Arthur Reid (figure skater), in 1997 U.S. Figure Skating Championships
- Arthur Reid (publisher) ([fl. 1890s–1910s), partner of James MacCallum Smith
- Arthur Reid (golfer) (1882–1959), professional golfer
- Arthur Reid (bowls) (fl. 1930s), Canadian lawn bowls international
- Sir Arthur Reid (judge), barrister and judge in British India

== See also ==
- Arthur Reed (disambiguation)
- Arthur Read (disambiguation)
- Arthur Reade, British labour movement activist
