= Arthur Reed =

Arthur Reed may refer to:

- Arthur Reed (footballer, born 1894) (1894–?), English footballer
- Arthur Reed, namesake of the Cromer Lifeboat Ruby and Arthur Reed II ON 1097
- Arthur Reed (politician) (1881–1961), British Member of Parliament for Exeter, 1931–1945
- Arthur Reed (1860–1984), American longevity claimant, died aged 123 years, 292 days; see longevity claims
- Arthur Reed (RAF officer) (1898–?), World War I flying ace
- Arthur Reed (Australian footballer) (1883–1951), Australian rules footballer
- Arthur Reed (cinematographer) for The Corpse Vanishes

== See also ==
- Arthur Reid (disambiguation)
- Arthur Read (disambiguation)
- Arthur Reade, British labour movement activist
