= 1956–57 Plunket Shield season =

Cricket tournament in New Zealand

1956–57 Plunket Shield
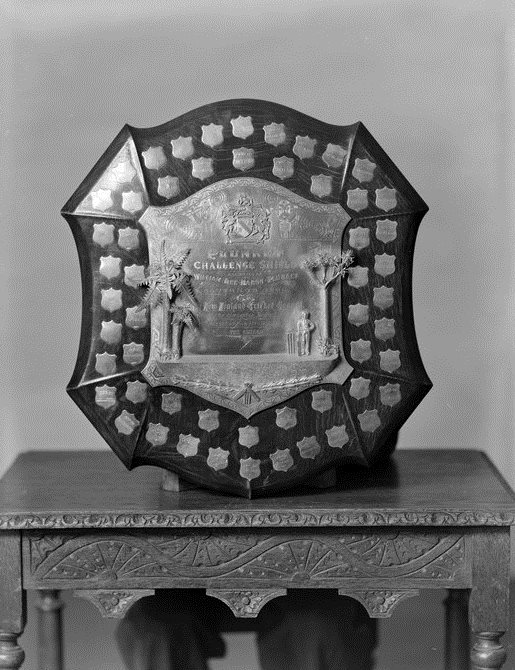
- The Plunket Shield trophy
- Cricket format: First-class
- Tournament format(s): Round-robin
- Champions: Wellington (9th title)
- Participants: 6
- Matches: 15

The 1956–57 Plunket Shield season was a tournament of the Plunket Shield, the domestic first-class cricket competition of New Zealand. It was the first season featuring the Northern Districts team.

Wellington won the championship, finishing at the top of the points table at the end of the round-robin tournament between the six first-class sides, Auckland, Canterbury, Central Districts, Northern Districts, Otago and Wellington. Eight points were awarded for a win, four points for having a first innings lead in a draw and two points for a first innings deficit in a draw.

== Table ==
Below are the Plunket Shield standings for the season:

Team	Played	Won	Lost	Drawn	Points	NetRpW
Wellington	5	4	0	1	34	13.871
Otago	5	3	1	1	28	2.766
Central Districts	5	1	1	3	18	4.686
Canterbury	5	1	1	3	14	-0.333
Auckland	5	0	2	3	10	-6.603
Northern Districts	5	0	4	1	4	-15.374
