= 1935–36 Plunket Shield season =

Cricket tournament in New Zealand

1935–36 Plunket Shield
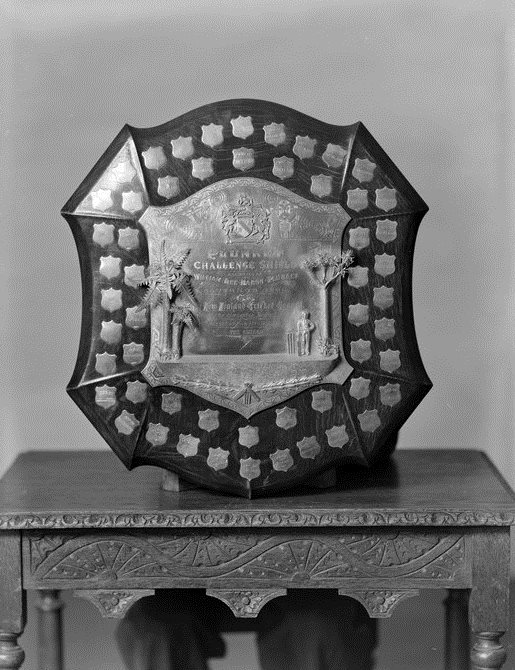
- The Plunket Shield trophy
- Cricket format: First-class
- Tournament format(s): Round-robin
- Champions: Wellington (6th title)
- Participants: 4
- Matches: 6

The 1935–36 Plunket Shield season was a tournament of the Plunket Shield, the domestic first-class cricket competition of New Zealand.

Wellington won the championship, finishing at the top of the points table at the end of the round-robin tournament between the four first-class sides, Auckland, Canterbury, Otago and Wellington.

== Table ==
Below are the Plunket Shield standings for the season:

Team	Played	Won	Lost	Drawn	Points	NetRpW
Wellington	3	2	0	1	18	3.858
Auckland	3	1	0	2	16	7.536
Otago	3	1	2	0	8	-5.594
Canterbury	3	0	2	1	2	-2.650
