= Stephen Gellatly =

New Zealand cricketer (born 1980)

Stephen James Gellatly (born 25 March 1980) is a New Zealand cricketer. He plays first-class cricket for the Wellington Firebirds. Gellatly made his State Shield debut on 3 January 2008 against the Otago Volts at Molyneux Park, Alexandra, and his State Championship debut on 6 March 2008, scoring 67* as Wellington beat Auckland by an innings.
