= Leslie Balcombe =

English footballer

Leslie Balcombe (1914 – 19 December 1938) was an English footballer of the 1930s. Born in Lambeth, he joined Gillingham from Tunbridge Wells Rangers in 1934 and went on to make 14 appearances for the club in The Football League, scoring one goal. He left to join Ashford Town (Kent) in 1937.

Balcombe joined the Royal Engineers and rose to the rank of Lance Sergeant. He died in the Royal Victoria Hospital, Folkestone after an accident in Chatham, Kent, where his motorcycle collided with a pedestrian. An inquest blamed the accident on poor lighting.
