= Bill Parry (footballer, born 1933) =

Welsh footballer

William Parry (18 February 1933 in Blaenau Ffestiniog – 20 May 2009) was a Welsh footballer, who played most of his professional career with Gillingham. He was spotted by scouts for Tottenham Hotspur while on trial for a Welsh amateur international selection, and joined them in 1950. He moved to Gillingham after 5 years, in the hope of gaining more first team experience, and went on to play 220 matches for the Kent side from 1955 to 1961, including 200 in the Football League. He finished his career with non-league sides Margate where he was captain of the side that won the Southern Football League, and Sittingbourne, retiring from the game in 1966.

He settled in Rochester, Kent after his playing days, and his son David continued the family ties to Gillingham, becoming a matchday announcer.
