= Jimmy McVeigh =

English footballer

James McVeigh (born 2 July 1949) is an English former professional footballer. He played for Wolverhampton Wanderers and Gillingham between 1968 and 1972.
