= Nigel Williams (footballer) =

English footballer

Personal information
- Full name: Nigel John Williams
- Date of birth: 29 July 1954 (age 72)
- Place of birth: Canterbury, England
- Positions: Right-back; midfielder

Senior career*
| Years | Team | Apps | (Gls) |
| 1972–1976 | Wolverhampton Wanderers | 11 | (0) |
| 1976–1979 | Gillingham | 53 | (1) |
| Total | | 64 | (1) |
- * Club domestic league appearances and goals

Nigel John Williams (born 29 July 1954) is an English former professional footballer who played as a right-back or midfielder. He played for Wolverhampton Wanderers and Gillingham between 1974 and 1979.
