= Syd Tyler =

English footballer

Personal information
- Full name: Sidney Tyler
- Date of birth: 7 December 1904
- Place of birth: Wolverhampton, England
- Date of death: 25 January 1971 (aged 66)
- Place of death: Walsall, England
- Height: 5 ft 10 in (1.78 m)
- Position: Full-back

Youth career
- Stourbridge

Senior career*
Years	Team	Apps	(Gls)
1922–1924	Manchester United	1	(0)
1924–1927	Wolverhampton Wanderers	18	(0)
1927–1929	Gillingham	76	(0)
1929–1931	Millwall	29	(0)
1931–1933	Colwyn Bay United		
- Chamberlain & Hookham
Total		124	(0)
- * Club domestic league appearances and goals

Sidney Tyler (7 December 1904 – 25 January 1971) was an English footballer who played as a full-back.

Born in Wolverhampton, Tyler began his career with nearby Stourbridge. As a 17-year-old, he joined Manchester United in May 1922, but he only played one match for them in the 1923–24 season, a 3–0 home win over Leicester City on 10 November 1923. In May 1924, he returned to his hometown club, Wolverhampton Wanderers, who had just been promoted back to the Second Division. However, Tyler struggled to hold down a first team spot at Wolves and only made 18 league appearances in three seasons there.

He signed for Third Division South side Gillingham in August 1927, where he made a far bigger impression. In two seasons with the Kent club, Tyler made 76 league appearances, but he left in 1929, first on trial with Norwich City, before joining Millwall on a permanent basis. After 29 games in two seasons with Millwall, Tyler moved to Colwyn Bay United in 1931, before returning to the West Midlands in 1933 to play for Chamberlain & Hookham.
