= Fred Lester (Australian footballer) =

Australian rules footballer

Personal information
- Full name: Frederick William David Lester
- Born: 26 February 1902; Fitzroy North, Victoria
- Died: 30 June 1959 (aged 57); Macleod, Victoria
- Original team: Woodend / Scotch College

Playing career^{1}
Years	Club	Games (Goals)
1928	Hawthorn	1 (0)
- ^{1} Playing statistics correct to the end of 1928.

Frederick William David Lester (26 February 1902 – 30 June 1959) was an Australian rules footballer who played with Hawthorn in the Victorian Football League (VFL).
