= Freddie Kingshott =

English footballer

Frederick John Kingshott (20 June 1929 - 6 April 2009) was an English professional footballer. He played for Doncaster Rovers and Gillingham between 1955 and 1960.
