= Tommy Rigg =

English footballer

Personal information
- Full name: Thomas Rigg
- Date of birth: 20 February 1920
- Place of birth: Bedlington, England
- Date of death: May 1995 (aged 74–75)
- Position: Goalkeeper

Youth career
- Ashington

Senior career*
Years	Team	Apps	(Gls)
1939	Middlesbrough	0	(0)
- Guested for Arsenal, Southampton and Bournemouth during World War II
1946–1949	Watford	80	(0)
1949–1951	Consett		
1951–1956	Gillingham	192	(0)
- * Club domestic league appearances and goals as of 21:57, 14 December 2007 (UTC)

Thomas Rigg (20 February 1920 – May 1995) was an English professional footballer, who played as a goalkeeper. His clubs included Watford and Gillingham, where he made nearly 200 Football League appearances. He was related to Jimmy Kelly, who also played for Watford.
