= Tommy Caldwell (footballer) =

English footballer

- Caldwell at West Ham United

Personal information
- Full name: Thomas Caldwell
- Date of birth: 10 June 1885
- Place of birth: West Ham, Essex, England
- Date of death: 31 December 1967 (aged 82)
- Place of death: Wickford, Essex, England
- Position: Outside left

Senior career*
Years	Team	Apps	(Gls)
- Ilford Alliance
- West Ham St Paul's
1907–1908	Clapton Orient	7	(0)
1908–1909	Southend United		
1909–1912	West Ham United	84	(12)
1912–1914	New Brompton		
- Reading
- * Club domestic league appearances and goals

Thomas Caldwell (10 June 1885 – 31 December 1967) was an English footballer who played as an outside-left. He played in the Football League for Clapton Orient, and also played for Southend United, West Ham United, New Brompton and Reading.

Caldwell played League football with Clapton Orient, making seven appearances during the 1907–08 season. He moved to Southern League club Southend United for a season, then to West Ham United in the summer of 1909. He made his Irons debut on the opening day of the season, alongside fellow debutants Robert Fairman, Robert Whiteman and Vincent Haynes, and totalled 40 league and cup appearances and 8 goals in 1909–10. This included a run of 32 consecutive games before he was sidelined through injury, as well as his only hat-trick for the club, scored in a 5–0 win over Bristol Rovers on 4 October 1909.

His partnership with Danny Shea produced a number of goals for Shea and Caldwell was an ever-present during his second season at Upton Park. His three seasons at West Ham saw him make 96 appearances, scoring 13 goals.
