= William Varty =

English footballer

William Varty (25 June 1906 – 1965) was an English footballer of the 1930s. He played professionally for Blackpool, Gillingham, Gateshead and Carlisle United. He made 33 Football League appearances.
