= Bill Patrick (footballer) =

Scottish footballer

William Cecil Gibson Patrick (12 March 1932 in Lochgelly – 18 April 2003) was a Scottish footballer. He played professionally for Coventry City and Gillingham between 1954 and 1960.
