= Harry Marsden =

English footballer

Henry Marsden (born 1902, date of death unknown) was an English footballer active in the 1920s and 1930s. He made a total of 209 appearances in The Football League for Nottingham Forest, Brighton & Hove Albion and Gillingham.
