= Thomas Syred =

English footballer

Personal information
- Full name: Thomas George Syred
- Place of birth: Gillingham - then in Kent, England
- Position: Winger

Senior career*
| Years | Team | Apps | (Gls) |
| 1933–1935 | Gillingham | 9 | (1) |
| 1935–1936 | Burnley | 0 | (0) |
| Total | | 9 | (1) |
- * Club domestic league appearances and goals

Thomas George Syred was an English professional footballer who played as a winger. He played a total of nine matches in the Football League and scored one goal.
