= George Nicol (footballer) =

Scottish footballer

Personal information
- Full name: George Nicol
- Date of birth: 14 December 1903
- Place of birth: Saltcoats, Scotland
- Date of death: 18 December 1968 (aged 65)
- Place of death: Ardrossan, Scotland
- Height: 5 ft 9 in (1.75 m)
- Position: Centre forward

Senior career*
| Years | Team | Apps | (Gls) |
- Ardrossan Winton Rovers
- Kilwinning Rangers
| 1927–1928 | Saltcoats Victoria | | |
| 1928–1929 | Manchester United | 6 | (2) |
| 1929–1932 | Brighton & Hove Albion | 31 | (23) |
| 1932 | Glenavon | | |
| 1932–1935 | Gillingham | 66 | (38) |
| 1935–1937 | RC Roubaix | | |
- * Club domestic league appearances and goals

George Nicol (14 December 1903 – 18 December 1968), also known as Geordie Nicol, was a Scottish professional footballer who scored 63 goals from 103 appearances in the English Football League playing for Manchester United, Brighton & Hove Albion and Gillingham. He played as a centre forward.

Nicol was born in Saltcoats, Scotland, and played in Scottish Junior football before joining Manchester United in January 1928. He moved on to Brighton in May 1929, and was their leading scorer in the 1930–31 season with 31 goals in all competitions. He had a season in the Irish League with Glenavon before returning to England to play for Gillingham and then for French club RC Roubaix. He died in Ardrossan at the age of 65.
