= Graham Knight (footballer, born 1952) =

English footballer

Personal information
- Full name: Graham John Knight
- Date of birth: 15 January 1952 (age 74)
- Place of birth: Chatham, England
- Position: Defender

Youth career
- 1968–1970: Gillingham

Senior career*
| Years | Team | Apps | (Gls) |
| 1970–1979 | Gillingham | 245 | (10) |
| 1974 | → Dartford (loan) | | |
| 1979–1980 | Maidstone United | | |
| 1980–1989 | Canterbury City | | |
| 1989 | Sittingbourne | | |

Managerial career
- 1987–1989: Canterbury City
- * Club domestic league appearances and goals

Graham John Knight (born 5 January 1952) is an English former professional footballer. He spent his entire professional career with Gillingham, where he made 245 Football League appearances and scored 10 goals. He had a testimonial match for Gillingham against Tottenham Hotspur on 11 May 1979.
