= Tom Hopkins (footballer) =

English footballer

Thomas Edward Hopkins (born 1911) was an English professional footballer. He played for Gillingham between 1933 and 1937. He stood 5 ft 8 1/2 in (1.74 m) tall.
