= Roy Bethell =

English footballer (1906–1976)

Personal information
- Date of birth: 9 August 1906
- Place of birth: Watford, England
- Date of death: 5 November 1976
- Place of death: Watford, England
- Position: Inside forward

Senior career*
Years	Team	Apps	(Gls)
1925–1928	St Albans City	58	(63)
1927–1929	Charlton Athletic	3	(0)
1929–1935	Gillingham	170	(32)
- * Club domestic league appearances and goals as of 17 September 2007

Roy Bethell (9 August 1906 – 5 November 1976) was an English footballer who played professionally for clubs including Charlton Athletic and Gillingham. He made 170 Football League appearances for the latter club.

After retiring from football he opened a greengrocers in the north of the town. He was married with one son.
