= Fred Liddle =

English footballer

James Frederick Liddle (born 29 November 1910) was an English professional footballer. He played for Queens Park Rangers, Huddersfield Town, Rotherham United, Newcastle United, Gillingham, Coventry City and Exeter City between 1927 and 1939. He was 5 ft 7 1/2 in (1.71 m) tall.
