= Tony Weston (footballer, born 1946) =

English footballer

Personal information
- Full name: Anthony Douglas Weston
- Date of birth: 3 April 1946 (age 80)
- Place of birth: Yalding, England
- Position: Defender

Youth career
- 1960–1963: Maidstone United
- 1963: Bromley

Senior career*
Years	Team	Apps	(Gls)
1963–1970	Gillingham	162	(3)
1970–1971	Ashford Town		
1971–1973	Folkestone		
1973	Berea Park		
1973–1973	Tonbridge		
1973–1976	Gravesend & Northfleet		
1976	Folkestone & Shepway		
- * Club domestic league appearances and goals

Anthony Douglas Weston (born 3 April 1946) is an English former professional footballer. He spent his entire professional career with Gillingham, where he made 162 Football League appearances.

== Career ==
In 1960 he played for the Maidstone Boys team and was later associated with the Maidstone United club. He played on more than one occasion whilst aged only 16 for Maidstone in their 1962–63 Isthmian League campaign but left the club at the end of that season.

In 1963 he joined Gillingham and made his first team debut in the Football League Third Division in November 1964 and by January 1965 had established himself as a first-choice player. From October 1965 he started a sequence of what would have been 106 consecutive competitive games for the club had he not missed one match (in March 1967) owing to family reasons. His appearances in the team were curtailed when he suffered a broken ankle in late October 1967; he recovered to play the last two matches of the season during May 1968. In his final season with Gillingham, 1969–70, he played in only a third of their league matches, but did play in all of the last five matches as the club successfully avoided relegation. In addition to the 162 league games in which he played for Gillingham, he appeared in seven FA Cup and ten League Cup matches. He scored three league goals, two of which were against Brentford; all his goals were match-winning strikes: two were the only goals in 1–0 wins; and the other the first in a 2–0 victory.

In the summer of 1970 he signed with Southern League Premier Division club Ashford Town. He was with the club only for the 1970–71 season, after which they were relegated. He played in all the 68 competitive matches (42 league and 26 in various cup competitions) that the club contested that season.

He switched clubs in May 1971 to Southern League Premier Division Folkestone. He played the 1971–72 season with them but during the following campaign, in February 1973, he left the club to play for Berea Park in South Africa. He could not settle overseas and returned within two months and in March 1973 and was signed by Tonbridge for the final stage of their successful promotion push from that season's Southern League Division One South.

He did not remain with Tonbridge: between 1973 and 1975 he played with Gravesend & Northfleet in the Southern League Division One South, he then returned to Folkestone, now known as Folkestone & Shepway, playing in the same league. In December 1976 playing with the latter club he had the misfortune to suffer a broken leg.

He returned to playing and in 1978 was with the amateur Oakwood Hospital club playing in the Tonbridge League.
