= Alex S. Forbes =

Scottish footballer

Alexander S. Forbes was a Scottish professional footballer. He played for Luton Town, Bournemouth and Gillingham between 1928 and 1935, making over 100 appearances in the Football League.
