= Trevor Long (footballer) =

English footballer (1931–2006)

Personal information
- Full name: Trevor George Long
- Date of birth: 1 July 1931
- Place of birth: Smethwick, England
- Date of death: 15 November 2006 (aged 75)
- Place of death: Bideford, England
- Position: Winger

Youth career
- Smethwick Schoolboys
- Birmingham County Schoolboys

Senior career*
Years	Team	Apps	(Gls)
- Mitchells & Butlers
1950–1952	Wolverhampton Wanderers	0	(0)
1952–1955	Gillingham	67	(15)
1955–1956	Reading	13	(5)
1956	Yeovil Town	52	(16)

International career
- England Junior International
- * Club domestic league appearances and goals

Trevor George Long (1 July 1931 – 15 November 2006) was an English professional footballer. His clubs included Wolverhampton Wanderers, Reading and Gillingham. He made 79 Football League appearances, and later played for Yeovil Town in the Southern Football League as a semi-professional.

== Playing career ==
Long attended Waterloo Road Primary School and won a scholarship to Smethwick Technical School where he gained notoriety scoring 60 goals in one season. His first employment was for Mitchells and Butlers in the Birmingham Works Football League where he played on the right wing. He also played for the works league representative team. During this time he also played in the Birmingham County Junior team. In 1947 they reached the last eight of the FA County Youth Cup competition having lost to Liverpool County 4-3 at The Hawthorns with Trevor scoring all 3 of Birmingham County's goals. After this match Long was formally approached by West Bromwich Albion manager Fred Everiss but Wolverhampton Wanderers manager Stan Cullis intervened and signed him on an amateur contract. At 16 years old he won a junior international cap by representing England in a match against Ireland in Dublin. When he turned 18 years old he completed his National Service with the RAF at RAF Stafford and signed a part-time professional contract with Wolves at the same time. He went on to win the Command Cup Final with the RAF in a 6-1 victory and he later played for the RAF Representative XI in a match versus an All Star XI at Headington. When he was demobbed, he signed a full-time contract with Wolves. In the 1951-52 season he featured 28 times for Wolves in the Central League and was part of the team that won the 1951-52 title. In all, he represented Wolves youth teams and reserves teams from 1948 to 1952.

In July, 1952, he transferred to Gillingham of the Football League Third Division South, who, earlier in 1950, were voted into the Football League when it expanded from 88 teams to 92. During his first season at Priestfield he was joint top scorer contributing 10 goals in 34 appearances and scored 1 goal in 3 FA Cup appearances. This made him the club's joint leading league goal scorer with Ken Lambert. In 1953-54 he made 26 league appearances scoring 4 goals and in 1954-55 he represented Gillingham 7 times.
