= Sim Raleigh =

English footballer

Personal information
- Full name: Simeon Raleigh
- Date of birth: 24 March 1909
- Place of birth: Brinsworth, Rotherham, England
- Date of death: 1 December 1934 (aged 25)
- Place of death: Rochester, England
- Position: Inside forward

Senior career*
Years	Team	Apps	(Gls)
1929–1930	Huddersfield Town	0	(0)
1930–1932	Hull City	31	(22)
1932–1934	Gillingham	83	(34)
Total		114	(56)
- * Club domestic league appearances and goals as of 15 August 2007

Simeon Raleigh (24 March 1909 – 1 December 1934) was an English professional footballer.

Raleigh's clubs included Huddersfield Town, Hull City and Gillingham. While playing for Gillingham in a match against Brighton & Hove Albion on 1 December 1934, he was injured in a clash of heads with an opponent, and continued to play but collapsed later in the game and died in hospital that night. The club raised over £250 (equivalent to £20,000 in 2025) for his widow and young son.
