= Bill Baldwin (footballer) =

English footballer

Personal information
- Full name: William Baldwin
- Date of birth: 31 January 1907
- Place of birth: Leigh, Lancashire, England
- Date of death: 1982 (aged 74–75)
- Height: 5 ft 10 in (1.78 m)
- Position: Centre forward

Senior career*
Years	Team	Apps	(Gls)
- Abram Wanderers
- Scunthorpe & Lindsey United
1930–1931	Chesterfield	4	(3)
1931–1932	Barrow	6	(1)
1932–1933	Oldham Athletic	1	(0)
1933–1934	Southport	23	(13)
1934–1936	Gillingham	60	(22)
1936–?	Crewe Alexandra	1	(0)
- * Club domestic league appearances and goals

William Baldwin (31 January 1907 – 1982) was an English professional footballer. His clubs included Chesterfield, Oldham Athletic and Gillingham. He made 95 Football League appearances.
