= Tom Holland (footballer, born 1902) =

English footballer (1902–1987)

Personal information
- Full name: Thomas Holland
- Date of birth: 16 July 1902
- Place of birth: Sheffield, England
- Date of death: July 1987
- Place of death: Weymouth, England
- Position: Goalkeeper

Senior career*
Years	Team	Apps	(Gls)
?–1925	Rotherham Town		
1925–1926	Doncaster Rovers	2	(0)
1926–1927	Weymouth		
1927–1932	Exeter City	59	(0)
1932–1936	Watford	62	(0)
1936–?	Gillingham	119	(0)
- Aylesford Paper Mills
- Weymouth
- * Club domestic league appearances and goals

Thomas Holland (16 July 1902 – July 1987) was an English professional footballer who played for clubs including Watford and Gillingham. He made nearly 120 Football League appearances for Gillingham.
