= Dick Doncaster =

Welsh footballer

Arthur Richard Doncaster (born 13 May 1908 in Barry) was a Welsh professional footballer. He played for Bolton Wanderers, Exeter City, Crystal Palace (1932–1933; 15 appearances, 4 goals) Reading and Gillingham between 1927 and 1936.
