= Dave Wiltshire =

English footballer

Personal information
- Full name: David Wiltshire
- Date of birth: 8 July 1954 (age 72)
- Place of birth: Folkestone, England
- Position: Right-back

Senior career*
| Years | Team | Apps | (Gls) |
| 1974–1976 | Gillingham | 62 | (2) |
| 1976 | Aldershot | 5 | (0) |
| Total | | 67 | (2) |
- * Club domestic league appearances and goals

David Wiltshire (born 8 July 1954) is an English former professional footballer who played as a right-back for Gillingham between 1973 and 1977, making 67 appearances in the Football League.
