= George Barrie (footballer) =

Scottish footballer

George Barrie (born 17 July 1904) was a Scottish professional footballer, who played as a defender for Crystal Palace and Gillingham between 1929 and 1937. He stood 5 ft 11 in (1.80 m) tall.

== Career ==
Barrie signed for Crystal Palace from Kettering Town in June 1929. In March 1934, he moved to Gillingham having made 79 league appearances (83 in total) without scoring.
