= Charlie Gellatly =

English footballer

Personal information
- Full name: Charles Thelluson Gellatly
- Date of birth: 18 April 1910
- Place of birth: Brodsworth, England
- Date of death: 10 November 1973 (aged 63)
- Position: Left-back

Senior career*
Years	Team	Apps	(Gls)
- Norwood Rangers
- Shirebrook
1928–1929	Halifax Town	0	(0)
- Shirebrook
1930–1931	Leicester City	0	(0)
1931–1934	Gillingham	56	(0)
- Darenth Training Colliery
- * Club domestic league appearances and goals

Charles Thelluson Gellatly (18 April 1910 – 10 November 1973) was an English professional footballer who played as a left-back.

Gellatly was born in Brodsworth. He played for Halifax Town, Leicester City and Gillingham between 1928 and 1934.
