= Arthur Read (footballer, born 1894) =

English footballer

Arthur Henry Read (born in 1894) was an English professional footballer. He played for Aberdare Athletic, Gillingham and Lincoln City between 1921 and 1925, making over 100 appearances in the Football League.
