= Bert Williams (footballer, born 1905) =

Welsh footballer (1905–1974)

Personal information
- Full name: Albert Leslie Williams
- Date of birth: 1 May 1905
- Place of birth: Newtown, Powys, Wales
- Date of death: 14 May 1974 (aged 69)
- Place of death: Maidstone, Kent, England
- Height: 5 ft 8 in (1.73 m)
- Position: Outside forward

Senior career*
Years	Team	Apps	(Gls)
- Chester
1929–1931	Wrexham	24	(3)
1931–1932	Gillingham	39	(5)
1932–1933	York City	7	(0)
1933–1934	Gillingham	11	(1)
- Burton Town
Total		81	(9)

International career
1930	Wales	1	(0)
- * Club domestic league appearances and goals

Albert Leslie Williams (1 May 1905 – 14 May 1974) was a Welsh professional footballer who played as an outside forward in the Football League for Wrexham, Gillingham and York City, and in non-League football for Chester and Burton Town. He earned one cap for the Wales national team, in a match against England on 22 November 1930.
