= William Duncan (footballer) =

Scottish footballer

William McKiddie Duncan (20 July 1913 – 1975) was a Scottish professional footballer. He played for Blackburn Rovers, Carlisle United and Gillingham between 1933 and 1938. He stood 5 ft 7 in (1.70 m) tall.
