= George Kidd (footballer) =

Scottish footballer

Personal information
- Full name: George Imlay Kidd
- Date of birth: 25 May 1909
- Place of birth: Dundee, Scotland
- Date of death: 21 January 1988
- Place of death: Tonbridge, England
- Position: Centre-forward

Senior career*
| Years | Team | Apps | (Gls) |
- Dundee North End
| 1931–1932 | Charlton Athletic | 6 | (1) |
| 1932–1935 | Gillingham | 119 | (2) |
| 1935–1936 | Luton Town | 9 | (0) |
- * Club domestic league appearances and goals

George Imlay Kidd (25 May 1909 – 21 January 1988) was a Scottish football player who played professionally for Charlton Athletic, Luton Town, and Gillingham, for whom he made over 100 Football League appearances.
