= Bill Arblaster =

English footballer

Personal information
- Full name: John William Arblaster
- Date of birth: 10 October 1892
- Place of birth: Darlaston, England
- Date of death: 8 November 1959 (aged 67)
- Place of death: Walsall, Staffordshire, England
- Position: Inside forward

Senior career*
Years	Team	Apps	(Gls)
- Darlaston
1923–1926	Merthyr Town	92	(29)
1926–1928	Gillingham	54	(24)
1928–?	Darlaston		
- Leamington Town
- Darlaston
- * Club domestic league appearances and goals

John William Arblaster (10 October 1892 – 8 November 1959) was an English professional footballer. His clubs included Merthyr Town and Gillingham. He made nearly 150 Football League appearances.
