= Fred Lester (footballer, born 1911) =

English footballer

Personal information
- Full name: Frederick Charles Lester
- Date of birth: 20 February 1911
- Place of birth: Rochester, England
- Date of death: 28 July 1974 (aged 63)
- Place of death: Chatham, England
- Height: 5 ft 10 in (1.78 m)
- Position: Left back

Senior career*
Years	Team	Apps	(Gls)
?–1931	Chatham Town		
1931–1937	Gillingham	201	(0)
1937–1939	Sheffield Wednesday	17	(0)
- * Club domestic league appearances and goals

Frederick Charles Lester (20 February 1911 – 28 July 1974) was an English footballer who played professionally for Gillingham and Sheffield Wednesday. He made over 200 Football League appearances for the former club.
