= Harry Randle =

English footballer

Personal information
- Full name: Herbert Clarence Randle
- Date of birth: 31 July 1906
- Place of birth: Stonebroom, England
- Date of death: 7 August 1976 (aged 70)
- Place of death: Chesterfield, England
- Height: 5 ft 8 1/2 in (1.74 m)
- Position: Half back

Senior career*
Years	Team	Apps	(Gls)
–	Stonebroom United		
–	Mansfield Town		
–	Shirebrook		
1930–193?	Birmingham	0	(0)
1932–1934	Southend United	40	(0)
1934–1937	Gillingham	110	(2)
1937–1939	Accrington Stanley	74	(1)
1939	Barrow	0	(0)
- * Club domestic league appearances and goals

Herbert Clarence Randle (31 July 1906 – 7 August 1976), known as Harry Randle, was an English footballer who played professionally for clubs including Southend United, Accrington Stanley and Gillingham, for whom he made 110 Football League appearances. Randle was born in Stonebroom and died in Chesterfield.
