= 1950–51 Gillingham F.C. season =

English football club season

Gillingham
1950–51 season
- Chairman: Charles Cox
- Manager: Archie Clark
- Third Division South: 22nd
- FA Cup: Second round
- Top goalscorer: League: Dave Thomas (19); All: Dave Thomas (21)
- Highest home attendance: 20,128 vs Millwall (2 September 1950)
- Lowest home attendance: 4,601 vs Exeter City (17 January 1951)
Home colours

During the 1950–51 English football season, Gillingham F.C. competed in the Football League Third Division South, the third tier of the English football league system. It was the first season of Gillingham's second spell in the Football League; prior to this season the club was elected back into the competition having lost its place in 1938. Gillingham's results in the first half of the season were poor, including a 9–2 defeat to Nottingham Forest, the highest number of goals the team had conceded for more than 20 years; at the end of 1950 they were second bottom of the Third Division South league table. In January and early February Gillingham climbed to 19th in the 24-team division after winning five times in six games, including a 9–4 victory over Exeter City, a new record for the club's highest Football League score which would stand for more than 30 years. After this they won only once in ten matches; the team finished the season 22nd in the division.

Gillingham also competed in the FA Cup, reaching the second round. The team played 50 competitive matches, winning 14, drawing 11, and losing 25. Dave Thomas, who joined the club in October, finished the season as the team's top goalscorer; he scored 19 times in the Football League and twice in the FA Cup. Jimmy Boswell made the most appearances, playing 46 times. The highest attendance recorded at the club's home ground, Priestfield Stadium, was 20,128 for a league game against Millwall on 2 September.

== Background and pre-season ==
Gillingham had been among the founder members of the Football League Third Division in 1920, which was renamed the Third Division South when a parallel Third Division North was created a year later. In 18 seasons between 1920 and 1938, the team consistently struggled, only finishing in the top half of the league table three times. They finished in the bottom two on five occasions, requiring them to apply each time for re-election to the League. The club's fifth application was unsuccessful; Ipswich Town of the regional Southern League received more votes than Gillingham from the Football League's other member clubs in the ballot following the 1937–38 season and thus secured election to the Third Division South. Gillingham initially took Ipswich's place in the Southern League; when competitive football resumed after the Second World War, Gillingham played in the more localised Kent League for one season before returning to the Southern League and winning the championship twice in three seasons. In 1950, the Football League opted to increase the membership of each of the two Third Divisions from 22 to 24 clubs; Gillingham applied for one of the new places in the Third Division South and received the highest number of votes among the applicants, thereby returning to the Football League after 12 years. Chairman Charles Cox told the press "It has been an uphill struggle to get back. Thank God we've done it. We must never find ourselves in that position again."

Archie Clark was the team's manager, a post he had held since 1939. Danny O'Donnell was newly appointed to the role of trainer and Dick Edmed, who had played for Gillingham in the 1920s, was assistant trainer. So as to be able to attract new players for the higher level of football, the club was granted special dispensation to pay wages higher than those normally permitted by Football League rules, and signed several players who had previously performed well for the reserve team of a Football League club but failed to gain a regular first team place. Larry Gage, a goalkeeper, Randolph Jenkins, an inside forward, Harry Ayres, a half-back, and Ron Lewin, a full-back, all joined from Fulham for a combined transfer fee of £14,000 (equivalent to £605,900 in 2023). Half-back Mike Skivington arrived from Leyton Orient, and Bobby Veck, an outside forward, moved from Southampton. The team wore Gillingham's usual kit of blue shirts and white shorts. Pre-season matches between Football League members were not permitted at the time, and clubs instead generally prepared for the season with a public trial match between two teams chosen from within their own squad of players; Gillingham staged such a match one week before the start of the Football League season between teams designated the "Reds" and the "Blues". Ahead of the new season additional terracing was erected at the club's home ground, Priestfield Stadium, to increase the stadium's capacity to 30,000.

== Third Division South ==
=== August–December ===
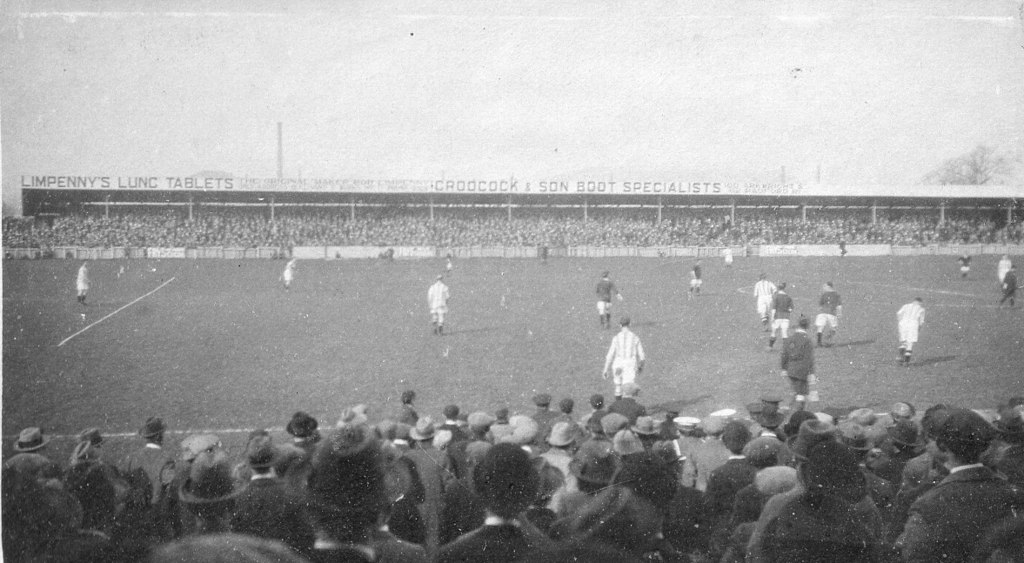
In November, Gillingham conceded nine goals against Nottingham Forest at the City Ground (pictured in the 1920s).

Gillingham's first match of the season was at home to the other newly elected club in the division, Colchester United; new signings Gage, Lewin, Ayres and Veck all made their debuts. The game drew an attendance of 19,542, the largest crowd recorded at Priestfield since January 1948. Colchester's Harry Bearryman twice cleared shots by Gillingham players off the goal-line after they had eluded his goalkeeper and another shot from the home team hit the cross-bar of the goal; the final score was 0–0. Four days later, Veck scored Gillingham's first goal of the season to give his team the lead away to Bournemouth & Boscombe Athletic, but the home team scored three times to win the game. A defeat away to Bristol City and a draw at home to Bournemouth meant that at the end of August Gillingham had yet to win a game. Jenkins made his debut in the home game against Bournemouth but did not play again for nearly three months.

On 2 September, Gillingham won 4–3 at home to Millwall; the attendance of 20,128 was the largest of the season at Priestfield. Following this first victory of the season, Gillingham lost away games against Bristol Rovers and Watford, both without scoring a goal. A correspondent for the Western Daily Press complimented Gage on his goalkeeping against Bristol Rovers, writing that Gillingham's opponents should have scored at least six goals as opposed to the three which they did. After the two defeats, Gillingham were 22nd out of 24 teams in the division. On 13 September, Veck scored Gillingham's first goal for three games with a penalty kick which gave his team a 1–0 win over Bristol Rovers; three days later Derek Lewis scored Gillingham's first hat-trick of the season in only his second professional match, a 4–1 win at home to Walsall. Having won two consecutive games for the first time during the season, Gillingham then began a run of nine consecutive league games without a victory. They ended September with defeats against Leyton Orient and Ipswich Town, both without scoring a goal, and then began October by losing away to Crystal Palace. A week later, Dave Thomas, a centre-forward newly signed from Watford, made his debut in a 1–1 draw with Brighton & Hove Albion. He scored his first goal for Gillingham in the final game of October, a 2–2 draw at home to Norwich City.

Gillingham began November with a 4–1 defeat away to Northampton Town, after which they were 21st in the Third Division South table, one point above the three teams tied for last place. On 18 November, Gillingham played away to Nottingham Forest, who were top of the table. The league leaders scored six goals in the first half and ultimately won the game 9–2; it was the first time that Gillingham had conceded nine goals in a game since 1927. Gillingham began December with a 4–2 victory away to Aldershot, their first league win since October; it was their tenth away match of the league season but the first to end in anything other than a defeat. Thomas scored Gillingham's second hat-trick of the season in the win. Following the victory, the team played five games in the final sixteen days of the calendar year but achieved only one draw and four defeats. Gillingham's final match of 1950 was away to Millwall on 30 December; Gillingham lost 4–3 and ended the year 23rd in the Third Division South, above bottom-placed Crystal Palace on goal average. Despite having only joined the club in October, Thomas was the team's leading Football League scorer, with eight goals in twelve games.

=== January–May ===
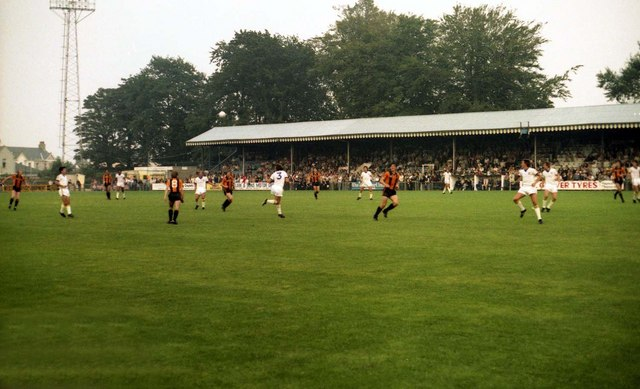
In April, Gillingham won their first away league game for two months at Torquay United's Plainmoor ground (pictured in the early 1980s).

Gillingham's first match of 1951 was at home to Watford on 13 January; the away team took an early lead but Gillingham came back to win the game 3–1. Four days later, Gillingham played at home to Exeter City; the attendance of 4,601 was the lowest of the season at Priestfield Stadium, due in large part to the game, which had been postponed earlier in the season, being rescheduled for a Wednesday afternoon. Gillingham took a 5–2 lead in the first half and added four more goals in the second half as the game finished 9–4. A report in the Birmingham Gazette noted that both teams' defences had been "over-run by fast-moving forwards". It was the highest number of goals Gillingham had scored in a Football League match, surpassing the previous record of six, and remained the club's highest league score until 1987. The team were 23rd in the table at the end of the month.

A goal from Veck gave Gillingham a 1–0 win at home to Leyton Orient in the first game of February, and the team followed this up with wins away to Exeter and at home to Torquay United; it was the first time Gillingham had won three consecutive games during the season and took the team up to 19th in the table. Following this run, they achieved only one victory in their next ten games. On 17 February, they lost 5–1 away to Ipswich Town; a week later they drew 0–0 with Crystal Palace but forward Charlie Burtenshaw suffered a broken leg which kept him out of the team for over a year. Thomas scored twice as Gillingham drew with Brighton & Hove Albion on 3 March, but the team failed to score any goals in their next three games, after which they were 21st in the table. On 24 March, they beat Northampton Town, their first victory for six weeks, but then lost away to both Southend United and Port Vale. Forward Billy Hales made his Football League debut in the game against Port Vale and scored Gillingham's fourth hat-trick of the season; as of 2023 he remained the only player to score three goals on his Football League debut for the club.

Gillingham began April with a third consecutive defeat, losing 4–1 at home to Nottingham Forest, for whom Wally Ardron scored a hat-trick before half-time. Veteran goalkeeper Johnny Burke, a regular starter for Gillingham in the Southern League, replaced Gage for the next game, a 2–1 victory away to Torquay United. Aged 39, it was his first Football League appearance since the 1946–47 season. He played in five of the last six games of the season and set a record for the oldest player to represent the club in the Football League which stood for over 50 years; Jack Day, another goalkeeper who had been with the club in the Southern League but had been kept out of the team by Gage, played against Aldershot on 21 April. Gillingham alternated victory and defeat in their final six games of the season; Hales scored twice in a 2–1 win over Swindon Town in the penultimate match to take his record to six goals in seven games. Gillingham ended the season with a 2–1 defeat at home to Plymouth Argyle, leaving them 22nd in the Third Division South, six points above the bottom two teams, who were required to apply for re-election to the Football League.

=== League match details ===
Key

- In result column, Gillingham's score shown first
- H = Home match
- A = Away match
- pen. = Penalty kick
- o.g. = Own goal

Results
Date	Opponents	Result	Goalscorers	Attendance
19 August 1950	Colchester United (H)	0–0		19,542
23 August 1950	Bournemouth & Boscombe Athletic (A)	1–3	Veck	16,070
26 August 1950	Bristol City (A)	0–2		19,725
30 August 1950	Bournemouth & Boscombe Athletic (H)	2–2	Veck (pen.), Russell	15,397
2 September 1950	Millwall (H)	4–3	Russell, Veck, Briggs, C. Burtenshaw	20,128
4 September 1950	Bristol Rovers (A)	0–3		14,519
9 September 1950	Watford (A)	0–5		10,213
13 September 1950	Bristol Rovers (H)	1–0	Veck (pen.)	12,293
16 September 1950	Walsall (H)	4–1	Lewis (3), Campbell	14,628
23 September 1950	Leyton Orient (A)	0–4		16,005
30 September 1950	Ipswich Town (H)	0–1		12,853
7 October 1950	Crystal Palace (A)	3–4	Veck, Briggs (o.g.), Marks	18,954
14 October 1950	Brighton & Hove Albion (H)	1–1	Forrester	15,060
21 October 1950	Newport County (A)	0–1		9,828
28 October 1950	Norwich City (H)	2–2	Thomas, Veck (pen.)	14,348
4 November 1950	Northampton Town (A)	1–4	Carr	10,785
11 November 1950	Port Vale (H)	1–1	Thomas	12,103
18 November 1950	Nottingham Forest (A)	2–9	Veck, Thomas	20,551
2 December 1950	Aldershot (A)	4–2	Thomas (3), Carr	7,253
16 December 1950	Colchester United (A)	2–4	Briggs, Thomas	6,941
23 December 1950	Bristol City (H)	1–2	B. Burtenshaw	8,575
25 December 1950	Reading (H)	0–3		9,539
26 December 1950	Reading (A)	1–1	B. Burtenshaw	17,401
30 December 1950	Millwall (A)	3–4	Thomas, C. Burtenshaw, Lewis	20,530
13 January 1951	Watford (H)	3–1	Thomas, Eggleston (o.g.), Veck	10,038
17 January 1951	Exeter City (H)	9–4	Lewis (3), Thomas (2), McGuire (2), Veck, Doyle (o.g.)	4,601
20 January 1951	Walsall (A)	1–2	Lewis	8,817
3 February 1951	Leyton Orient (H)	1–0	Veck	8,358
7 February 1951	Exeter City (A)	2–1	Campbell, Thomas	5,140
10 February 1951	Torquay United (H)	2–0	Veck (pen.), C. Burtenshaw	12,995
17 February 1951	Ipswich Town (A)	1–5	C. Burtenshaw	9,676
24 February 1951	Crystal Palace (H)	0–0		11,478
3 March 1951	Brighton & Hove Albion (A)	2–2	Thomas (2)	10,588
10 March 1951	Newport County (H)	0–1		9,050
17 March 1951	Norwich City (A)	0–2		18,943
23 March 1951	Southend United (H)	0–0		15,356
24 March 1951	Northampton Town (H)	3–1	Veck, Lewis, Thomas	10,657
26 March 1951	Southend United (A)	0–4		14,500
31 March 1951	Port Vale (A)	3–4	Hales (3)	5,400
7 April 1951	Nottingham Forest (H)	1–4	Thomas	13,845
14 April 1951	Torquay United (A)	2–1	Thomas (2)	6,605
18 April 1951	Plymouth Argyle (A)	0–2		11,313
21 April 1951	Aldershot (H)	3–0	B. Burtenshaw, Hales, Thomas	10,492
28 April 1951	Swindon Town (A)	0–2		3,915
2 May 1951	Swindon Town (H)	2–1	Hales (2, 1 pen.)	8,285
5 May 1951	Plymouth Argyle (H)	1–2	B. Burtenshaw	12,096

=== Partial league table ===
Football League Third Division South final table, bottom positions
Pos	Team	Pld	W	D	L	GF	GA	GAv	Pts	
21	Northampton Town	46	10	16	20	55	67	0.821	36	
22	Gillingham	46	13	9	24	69	101	0.683	35	
23	Watford	46	9	11	26	54	88	0.614	29	Required to apply for re-election
24	Crystal Palace	46	8	11	27	33	84	0.393	27	Required to apply for re-election

== Cup matches ==
=== FA Cup ===
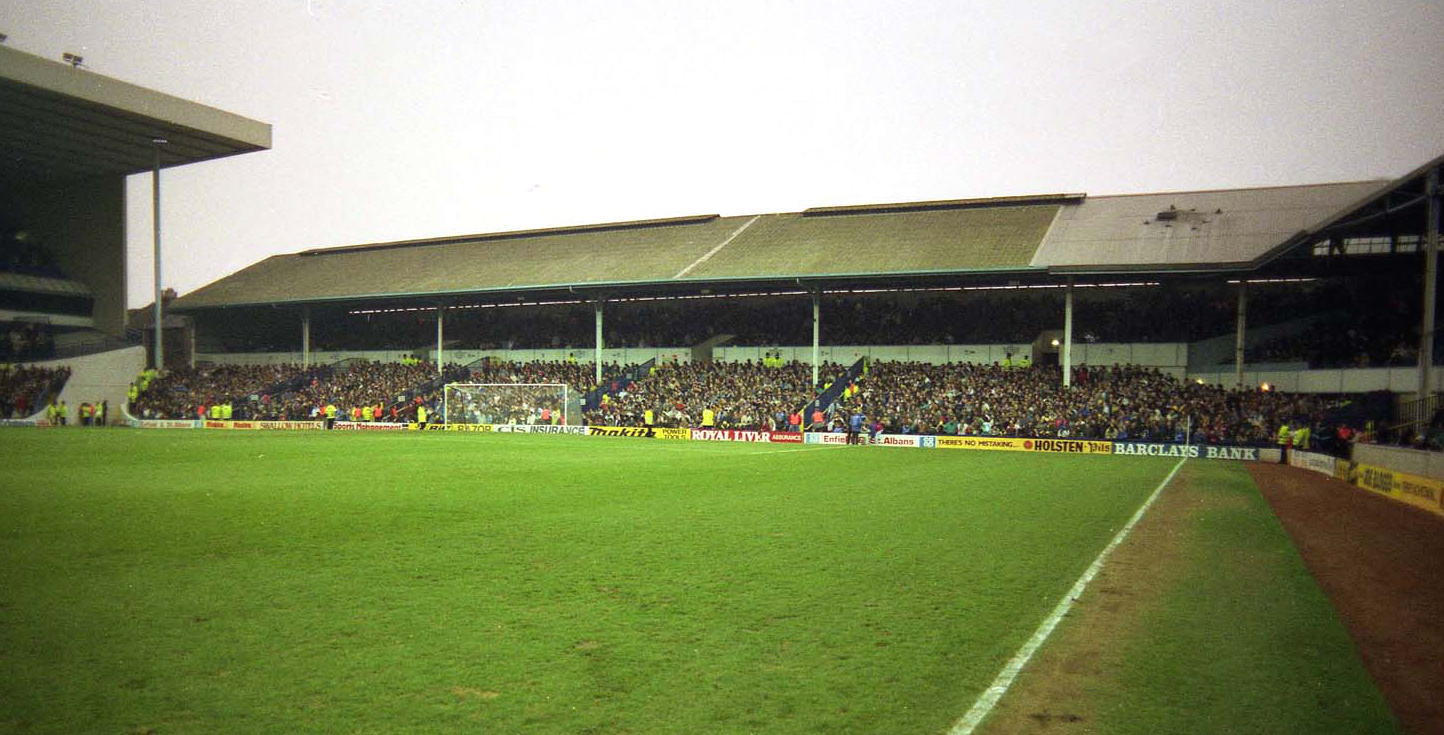
Gillingham were eliminated from the FA Cup at Tottenham Hotspur's White Hart Lane ground (pictured in 1991).

As a Third Division South club, Gillingham entered the 1950–51 FA Cup in the first round; their opponents were Linby Colliery of the Central Alliance, a semi-professional team including several players employed at the eponymous mining facility. Linby had won through six qualifying rounds to reach this stage of the competition, the only team to do so. Gillingham took a four-goal lead in the first half and, although they conceded a goal in the second half, held on for a 4–1 victory.

In the second round, Gillingham played away to fellow Third Division South club Bristol Rovers. Thomas gave Gillingham the lead before Rovers scored twice; a late goal from Jackie Carr meant that the game ended in a draw and a replay was required. Four days later at Priestfield, Rovers took the lead but Carr scored to ensure another draw. Under the rules of the competition the second replay took place at a neutral venue. At Tottenham Hotspur's White Hart Lane ground, Gillingham took the lead with a goal from Lewis but Rovers scored twice to win the game and eliminate Gillingham from the competition.

==== FA Cup match details ====
Key

- In result column, Gillingham's score shown first
- H = Home match
- A = Away match
- N = Match played at a neutral venue

Results
Date	Round	Opponents	Result	Goalscorers	Attendance
25 November 1950	First	Linby Colliery (A)	4–1	Thomas, C.Burtenshaw, B.Burtenshaw, Jenkins	4,635
9 December 1950	Second	Bristol Rovers (A)	2–2	Thomas, Carr	15,479
13 December 1950	Second (replay)	Bristol Rovers (H)	1–1 (a.e.t.)	Carr	10,642
18 December 1950	Second (second replay)	Bristol Rovers (N)	1–2	Lewis	3,927

== Players ==
During the season, 27 players made at least one appearance for Gillingham. Jimmy Boswell made the most, playing in 42 league games and all four FA Cup matches. Charlie Marks made more league appearances, playing 44 times, but did not feature in any of the FA Cup games. Day made the fewest appearances, playing only once. The game proved to be the only Football League appearance of his career. Thomas was the team's leading scorer with 21 goals in total; Veck and Lewis both also reached double figures.

Player statistics
Player	Position	Third Division South		FA Cup		Total	
Player	Position	Apps	Goals	Apps	Goals	Apps	Goals
Harry Ayres	HB	34	0	4	0	38	0
Jimmy Boswell	HB	42	0	4	0	46	0
Jackie Briggs	FW	14	2	0	0	14	2
Johnny Burke	GK	5	0	0	0	5	0
Bill Burtenshaw	FW	24	4	4	1	28	5
Charlie Burtenshaw	FW	26	4	4	1	30	5
Joe Campbell	FW	12	2	0	0	12	2
Jackie Carr	FW	11	2	3	2	14	4
Bill Collins	HB	13	0	0	0	13	0
Jack Day	GK	1	0	0	0	1	0
George Dorling	FB	10	0	4	0	14	0
George Forrester	FW	18	1	0	0	18	1
Larry Gage	GK	40	0	4	0	44	0
Billy Hales	FW	8	6	0	0	8	6
Len Henson	HB	6	0	0	0	6	0
Randolph Jenkins	FW	2	0	3	1	5	1
Tommy Kingsnorth	HB	28	0	0	0	28	0
Ron Lewin	FB	38	0	4	0	42	0
Derek Lewis	FW	20	9	1	1	21	10
Charlie Marks	FB	44	1	0	0	44	1
Les McGuire	FW	5	2	0	0	5	2
George Piper	HB	4	0	0	0	4	0
Hughie Russell	FW	21	2	0	0	21	2
Mike Skivington	HB	8	0	4	0	12	0
Dave Thomas	FW	34	19	4	2	38	21
Bobby Veck	FW	36	12	1	0	37	12
Johnny Warsap	FW	2	0	0	0	2	0

FW = Forward, HB = Half-back, GK = Goalkeeper, FB = Full-back

== Aftermath ==
Gillingham's first season back in the Football League was not a success in financial terms; transfer fees and increased wages meant that the club registered a loss of £12,483 (equivalent to £495,300 in 2023). There was once again significant turnover of the club's playing staff at the end of the season. Veteran goalkeeper Burke opted to retire from football. Veck, the team's second-highest goalscorer, was offered a new contract with the club but rejected it and signed for Chelmsford City of the Southern League. Gage, Carr, George Piper and Joe Campbell also left to join Southern League clubs. Skivington was signed by Brentford of the Football League Second Division but did not play a game for them before moving on. Gillingham continued to struggle in the Third Division South, finishing in the bottom four in both of the following two seasons.
