= 1949–50 Gillingham F.C. season =

English football club season

Gillingham
1949–50 season
- Chairman: Charles Cox
- Manager: Archie Clark
- Southern League Division One: 5th
- FA Cup: Second Round
- Southern League Cup: Second Round
- Top goalscorer: League: Harry Williams (18); All: Harry Williams (18)
- Highest home attendance: TBC
- Lowest home attendance: TBC
Home colours

During the 1949–50 English football season, Gillingham F.C. played in the Southern League Division One. It was the fourth season of the club's third spell in the league.

Gillingham also competed in the FA Cup, reaching the second round.

== Background and pre-season ==
Gillingham had been among the founder members of the Football League Third Division in 1920, which was renamed the Third Division South when a parallel Third Division North was created a year later. In 18 seasons between 1920 and 1938, the team consistently struggled, only finishing in the top half of the league table three times. They finished in the bottom two on five occasions, requiring them to apply each time for re-election to the League. The club's fifth application was unsuccessful; Ipswich Town of the regional Southern League received more votes than Gillingham from the Football League's other member clubs in the ballot following the 1937–38 season and thus secured election to the Third Division South. Gillingham initially took Ipswich's place in the Southern League; when competitive football resumed after the Second World War, Gillingham played in the more localised Kent League for one season before returning to the Southern League in the 1946–47 season and winning the championship twice in three seasons.

Archie Clark was the team's manager, a post he had held since 1939. The club signed several new players, including Harry Williams and Billy Bates, both forwards, from Tottenham Hotspur and Watford respectively. Williams was signed after he scored a hat-trick in a pre-season trial match. Joe Millbank, a half-back, was signed from Queens Park Rangers; he had been made available for transfer by his former club and valued at £5,000, but because Gillingham played outside the Football League they were not required to pay any fee to sign him. Jack Day, a goalkeeper who had played for Gillingham between 1946 and 1948, rejoined the club after short and unsuccessful spells with Football League clubs Fulham and Brighton & Hove Albion. The team wore Gillingham's usual kit of blue shirts and white shorts.

== Southern League Division One ==
=== August–December ===
Gillingham began the season with a 3–0 defeat away to Gravesend & Northfleet on 20 August. Williams and Bates made their debuts for the club, as did Fred Collier, a full-back, and Victor Cook, a goalkeeper; it would prove to be the only match Collier played for Gillingham. Four days later, the team played their first game of the season at their home ground, Priestfield Stadium, against Hastings United. Day replaced Cook in goal. In an extremely one-sided game, Gillingham won 8–0; Williams scored six goals, the most scored by a Gillingham player in a single game since Hughie Russell scored nine times in a 12–1 victory over Gloucester City in November 1946.

Gillingham's final three games of 1949 took place within four days.

=== January–May ===
Gillingham's first game of 1950 was at home to the Welsh team Lovell's Athletic.

Gillingham finished in fifth place in the Southern League Division One, 16 points behind champions Merthyr Tydfil.

=== League match details ===
Key

- In result column, Gillingham's score shown first
- H = Home match
- A = Away match
- pen. = Penalty kick
- o.g. = Own goal

Results
| Date | Opponents | Result | Goalscorers | Attendance |
|---|---|---|---|---|
| 20 August 1949 | Gravesend & Northfleet (A) | 0–3 | | 4,915 |
| 24 August 1949 | Hastings United (H) | 8–0 | Williams (6), Carr, Forrester | 7,568 |
| 27 August 1949 | Gloucester City (H) | 6–1 | Williams (2), Warsap (2), Carr, Russell (pen.) | 9,164 |
| 3 September 1949 | Hereford United (A) | 1–1 | Carr | 5,548 |
| 7 September 1949 | Hastings United (A) | 1–2 | Carr | 1,995 |
| 14 September 1949 | Chelmsford City (H) | 2–2 | Carr, Briggs | 7,772 |
| 17 September 1949 | Cheltenham Town (H) | 3–1 | Briggs (2), Kingsnorth (pen.) | 8,580 |
| 21 September 1949 | Chelmsford City (A) | 1–1 | Warsap | 6,500 |
| 24 September 1949 | Colchester United (A) | 1–2 | Williams | 10,918 |
| 1 October 1949 | Cheltenham Town (A) | 2–1 | Carr, Russell | 3,213 |
| 8 October 1949 | Torquay United Reserves (H) | 1–1 | Williams | 9,312 |
| 15 October 1949 | Worcester City (A) | 1–2 | B. Burtenshaw | 4,464 |
| 29 October 1949 | Dartford (A) | 1–2 | Forrester | 5,883 |
| 5 November 1949 | Kidderminster Harriers (H) | 4–2 | B. Burtenshaw (2), Forrester, Russell | 5,937 |
| 19 November 1949 | Worcester City (H) | 2–0 | Russell (2) | 9,479 |
| 3 December 1949 | Bedford Town (H) | 1–0 | Potter (o.g.) | 7,945 |
| 24 December 1949 | Gloucester City (A) | 1–3 | Williams | 3,253 |
| 26 December 1949 | Tonbridge (H) | 3–0 | C. Burtenshaw, Russell, Briggs | 10,381 |
| 27 December 1949 | Tonbridge (A) | 1–2 | Briggs | 6,756 |
| 31 December 1949 | Yeovil Town (H) | 0–1 | | 11,577 |
| 7 January 1950 | Lovell's Athletic (H) | 2–0 | Carr, B. Burtenshaw | 7,571 |
| 14 January 1950 | Bedford Town (A) | 1–1 | B. Burtenshaw | 3,954 |
| 28 January 1950 | Torquay United Reserves (A) | 2–1 | Williams (2) | 1,962 |
| 4 February 1950 | Gravesend & Northfleet (H) | 4–2 | Williams, Russell, B. Burtenshaw, Forrester | 11,158 |
| 11 February 1950 | Exeter City Reserves (H) | 4–1 | Russell, B. Burtenshaw, Carr, Williams | 7,609 |
| 25 February 1950 | Lovell's Athletic (A) | 2–2 | B. Burtenshaw, Williams | 500 |
| 4 March 1950 | Barry Town (A) | 3–0 | B. Burtenshaw (2), Williams | 171 |
| 9 March 1950 | Chingford (A) | 2–1 | B. Burtenshaw, Russell | 307 |
| 11 March 1950 | Bath City (H) | 1–1 | Carr | 7,749 |
| 15 March 1950 | Hereford United (H) | 4–0 | McGuire, Carr, C. Burtenshaw (pen.), Williams | 6,000 |
| 25 March 1950 | Yeovil Town (A) | 1–2 | Russell | not recorded |
| 1 April 1950 | Guildford City (H) | 0–0 | | 7,973 |
| 5 April 1950 | Headington United (H) | 2–0 | Forrester (2) | 4,086 |
| 7 April 1950 | Weymouth (H) | 1–1 | Briggs | 9,233 |
| 8 April 1950 | Chingford (H) | 4–1 | Hales (2), Kingsnorth, Warsap | 6,277 |
| 12 April 1950 | Kidderminster Harriers (A) | 2–0 | Hales, C. Burtenshaw | not recorded |
| 15 April 1950 | Exeter City Reserves (A) | 1–5 | Briggs | not recorded |
| 17 April 1950 | Merthyr Tydfil (A) | 0–4 | | not recorded |
| 22 April 1950 | Headington United (A) | 3–1 | Briggs (2), Forrester | 5,500 |
| 24 April 1950 | Weymouth (A) | 0–2 | | not recorded |
| 26 April 1950 | Dartford (H) | 2–0 | Russell, Kingsnorth (pen.) | 4,000 |
| 28 April 1950 | Barry Town (H) | 1–0 | Carr | 3,423 |
| 29 April 1950 | Colchester United (H) | 6–1 | Hales (3), Warsap, Russell, Briggs | 4,875 |
| 1 May 1950 | Bath City (A) | 1–3 | B. Burtenshaw | not recorded |
| 3 May 1950 | Merthyr Tydfil (H) | 3–1 | Russell, Warsap, Carr | 8,126 |
| 6 May 1950 | Guildford City (A) | 1–4 | Piper | not recorded |

== Partial league table ==
Southern League Division One, leading positions
| Pos | Team | Pld | W | D | L | GF | GA | GAv | Pts | |
|---|---|---|---|---|---|---|---|---|---|---|
| 1 | Merthyr Tydfil | 46 | 34 | 3 | 9 | 143 | 62 | 2.306 | 71 | |
| 2 | Colchester United | 46 | 31 | 9 | 6 | 109 | 51 | 2.137 | 71 | Elected to the Football League Third Division South |
| 3 | Yeovil Town | 46 | 29 | 7 | 10 | 104 | 45 | 2.311 | 65 | |
| 4 | Chelmsford City | 46 | 26 | 9 | 11 | 121 | 64 | 1.891 | 61 | |
| 5 | Gillingham | 46 | 23 | 9 | 14 | 92 | 61 | 1.508 | 55 | Elected to the Football League Third Division South |
| 6 | Dartford | 46 | 20 | 9 | 17 | 70 | 65 | 1.077 | 49 | |
| 7 | Worcester City | 46 | 21 | 7 | 18 | 85 | 80 | 1.063 | 49 | |

== FA Cup ==
Gillingham entered the 1949–50 FA Cup at the fourth and final qualifying round stage; their opponents were another Southern League Division One team, Guildford City.

=== FA Cup match details ===
Key

- In result column, Gillingham's score shown first
- H = Home match
- A = Away match

Results
| Date | Round | Opponents | Result | Goalscorers | Attendance |
|---|---|---|---|---|---|
| 12 November 1949 | Fourth qualifying | Guildford City (A) | 3–2 | C. Burtenshaw, Russell, Briggs | 7,227 |
| 26 November 1949 | First | Hastings United (A) | 3–1 | Collins (pen.), Russell, C. Burtenshaw | 9,150 |
| 10 December 1949 | Second | Yeovil Town (A) | 1–3 | Russell (pen.) | 12,041 |

== Southern League Cup ==
Gillingham lost to Colchester United in the second round of the 1949–50 Southern League Cup. The veteran forward Tug Wilson made his only appearance of the season in the second round match; it was the final game he played for Gillingham, a club he had joined as a teenager in 1936.

=== Southern League Cup match details ===
Key

- In result column, Gillingham's score shown first
- H = Home match
- A = Away match

Results
| Date | Round | Opponents | Result | Goalscorers | Attendance |
|---|---|---|---|---|---|
| 10 September 1949 | First | Barry Town (H) | 3–1 | Forrester, Briggs, Carr | 7,690 |
| 12 October 1949 | Second | Colchester United (H) | 0–1 (a.e.t.) | | 6,639 |

== Players ==
Charlie Marks made the most appearances, playing 49 times. Harry Williams was the team's top goalscorer, scoring 18 times in just 20 games.

Player statistics
| Player | Position | Southern League Division One | | FA Cup | | Southern League Cup | | Total | |
| Player | Position | Apps | Goals | Apps | Goals | Apps | Goals | Apps | Goals |
|---|---|---|---|---|---|---|---|---|---|
| George Armstrong | FB | 9 | 0 | 0 | 0 | 0 | 0 | 9 | 0 |
| Billy Bates | FW | 6 | 0 | 0 | 0 | 2 | 0 | 8 | 0 |
| Jimmy Boswell | HB | 30 | 0 | 3 | 0 | 2 | 0 | 35 | 0 |
| Jackie Briggs | FW | 25 | 10 | 3 | 1 | 1 | 1 | 29 | 12 |
| Johnny Burke | GK | 28 | 0 | 2 | 0 | 1 | 0 | 31 | 0 |
| Bill Burtenshaw | FW | 18 | 12 | 3 | 0 | 0 | 0 | 21 | 12 |
| Charlie Burtenshaw | FW | 26 | 3 | 3 | 2 | 0 | 0 | 29 | 5 |
| Jackie Carr | FW | 36 | 12 | 0 | 0 | 1 | 1 | 37 | 13 |
| Fred Collier | FB | 1 | 0 | 0 | 0 | 0 | 0 | 1 | 0 |
| Bill Collins | HB | 35 | 0 | 3 | 1 | 0 | 0 | 38 | 1 |
| Victor Cook | GK | 2 | 0 | 0 | 0 | 0 | 0 | 2 | 0 |
| Jack Day | GK | 16 | 0 | 1 | 0 | 1 | 0 | 18 | 0 |
| George Dorling | FB | 37 | 0 | 3 | 0 | 2 | 0 | 42 | 0 |
| George Forrester | FW | 35 | 7 | 3 | 0 | 2 | 1 | 40 | 8 |
| Billy Hales | FW | 9 | 6 | 0 | 0 | 0 | 0 | 9 | 6 |
| J. Kay | FW | 0 | 0 | 0 | 0 | 1 | 0 | 1 | 0 |
| Tommy Kingsnorth | HB | 42 | 3 | 3 | 0 | 2 | 0 | 47 | 3 |
| Charlie Marks | FB | 44 | 0 | 3 | 0 | 2 | 0 | 49 | 0 |
| Les McGuire | FW | 4 | 1 | 0 | 0 | 0 | 0 | 4 | 1 |
| Joe Millbank | HB | 3 | 0 | 0 | 0 | 0 | 0 | 3 | 0 |
| George Piper | HB | 23 | 1 | 0 | 0 | 0 | 0 | 23 | 1 |
| George Poulton | FW | 1 | 0 | 0 | 0 | 0 | 0 | 1 | 0 |
| Hughie Russell | FW | 32 | 13 | 3 | 3 | 2 | 0 | 37 | 16 |
| Stan Trumper | FW | 4 | 0 | 0 | 0 | 1 | 0 | 5 | 0 |
| Johnny Warsap | FW | 21 | 6 | 0 | 0 | 0 | 0 | 21 | 6 |
| Harry Williams | FW | 19 | 18 | 0 | 0 | 1 | 0 | 20 | 18 |
| Tug Wilson | FW | 0 | 0 | 0 | 0 | 1 | 0 | 1 | 0 |

FW = Forward, HB = Half-back, GK = Goalkeeper, FB = Full-back

== Aftermath ==
The Football League opted to increase the membership of each of the two Third Divisions from 22 to 24 clubs with effect from the 1950–51 season; Gillingham applied for one of the new places in the Third Division South and received the highest number of votes among the applicants, thereby returning to the Football League after 12 years. Charles Cox, the club's chairman, told the press "It has been an uphill struggle to get back. Thank God we've done it. We must never find ourselves in that position again."
