= List of Gillingham F.C. seasons =

The Gillingham team line up before a match in the club's first season in the Football League, along with club officials and the local mayor

Gillingham Football Club is an English association football club originally formed in 1893 under the name New Brompton F.C. The club adopted its present name in 1912, and played in the Southern League until 1920, when that league's top division was absorbed into the Football League as its new Division Three. The "Gills" were voted out of the league in favour of Ipswich Town at the end of the 1937–38 season, but returned 12 years later, when that league was expanded from 88 to 92 clubs.

Twice in the late 1980s Gillingham came close to winning promotion to the second tier of English football, but a decline then set in and in 1993 the club narrowly avoided relegation to the Football Conference. In 2000, Gillingham reached the second tier of the English league for the first time in the club's history. They went on to spend five seasons at this level, achieving a club record highest league finish of eleventh place in the 2002–03 season before being relegated twice to return to the league's bottom division, known since 2004 as Football League Two. The club has won honours at a professional level namely the Football League Fourth Division championship in the 1963–64 season as well as the Football League Two championship in the 2012–13 season.

== Seasons ==
Season	League									FA Cup	EFL Cup (Note: The Football League Cup competition did not start until the 1960–61 season.)	EFL Trophy (Note: The EFL Trophy did not start until the 1983–84 season.)	Other		Top scorer(s) (Note: Other than where stated, includes all senior competitive first-team matches.)		Ref
Season	Division	P	W	D	L	GF	GA	Pts	Pos	FA Cup	EFL Cup	EFL Trophy	Other		Top scorer(s)		Ref
1893–94	New Brompton did not play league football									QR1			FA Amateur Cup	R3Q (Note: New Brompton's only entry to the FA Amateur Cup. In 1894 the club turned professional and ceased to be eligible to enter.)	Albert Jenner	2 (Note: FA Cup goals only. The scorers of New Brompton's goals in the FA Amateur Cup are not known.)	
1894–95	SL Div 2	12	11	0	1	57	10	22	1st (Note: New Brompton, as champions of Division Two, played the bottom team in Division One, Swindon Town, in a two-legged test match and won 5–1, thus gaining promotion.)	QR3					Arthur Rule	22	
1895–96	SL Div 1	18	7	4	7	30	37	18	6th	QR2					Dave Hutcheson	8 (Note: Southern League and FA Cup goals only. Details of the club's goalscorers in the Kent League in this season are not recorded.)	
1895–96	KL Div 1	22	9	3	10	36	42	21	7th	QR2					Dave Hutcheson	8	
1896–97	SL Div 1	20	7	2	11	32	42	16	8th	QR4					Jack Frettingham	10 (Note: Southern League and FA Cup goals only. Details of the club's goalscorers in the Thames and Medway Combination in this season are not recorded.)	
1896–97	TMC	10	2	0	8	21	32	4	5th	QR4					Jack Frettingham	10	
1897–98	SL Div 1	22	9	4	9	37	37	22	6th	QR5					Jack Frettingham	13	
1897–98	TMC	14	9	2	3	33	15	20	3rd	QR5					Jack Frettingham	13	
1898–99	SL Div 1	24	10	5	9	38	30	25	6th	R1					Jack Frettingham	14	
1898–99	TMC	16	12	2	2	48	15	26	1st	R1					Jack Frettingham	14	
1899–1900	SL Div 1	28	9	6	13	39	49	24	11th	QR4					Jack Frettingham	11	
1899–1900	TMC	10	8	1	1	20	6	17	1st	QR4					Jack Frettingham	11	
1900–01	SL Div 1	28	7	5	16	34	51	19	12th	QR5					Jack Frettingham	14	
1900–01	TMC	6	4	1	1	15	7	9	2nd	QR5					Jack Frettingham	14	
1901–02	SL Div 1	30	10	7	13	39	38	27	10th	RInt					Alf Milward	12 (Note: Scorer of one FA Cup goal in this season not recorded.)	
1901–02	TMC	12	10	1	1	52	7	21	1st	RInt					Alf Milward	12	
1902–03	SL Div 1	30	11	11	8	37	35	33	6th	RInt					Charlie Satterthwaite	14	
1902–03	TMC	12	5	1	6	33	42	11	4th	RInt					Charlie Satterthwaite	14	
1903–04	SL Div 1	34	6	13	15	26	43	25	16th	RInt					Jim Stevenson	7	
1904–05	SL Div 1	34	11	11	12	40	41	33	9th	R1					Walter Leigh	11	
1905–06	SL Div 1	34	7	8	19	20	62	22	17th	R2					Bill Marriott	5	
1906–07	SL Div 1	38	12	9	17	47	59	33	16th	R2					Dan Cunliffe	15	
1907–08	SL Div 1	38	9	7	22	44	75	25	20th (Note: Despite finishing last, New Brompton avoided relegation due to the expansion of the league.)	R2					Charlie McGibbon	22	
1908–09	SL Div 1	40	17	7	16	48	59	41	7th	QR5					Arthur Pickett	9	
1909–10	SL Div 1	42	19	5	18	76	74	43	12th	R1					Albert Court	25	
1910–11	SL Div 1	38	11	8	19	34	65	30	18th	R1					Jock Taylor	15	
1911–12	SL Div 1	38	11	9	18	35	72	31	18th	QR4					Fred Corbett; Abel Lee; Jock Taylor	6	
1912–13	SL Div 1	38	12	10	16	36	53	34	15th	R1					Arthur Wolstenholme	7	
1913–14	SL Div 1	38	13	9	16	48	49	35	13th	R2					Charlie Hafekost	10	
1914–15	SL Div 1	38	6	8	24	43	82	20	20th	R1					Sam Gilligan; Peter Glen	8	
No competitive football was played between 1915 and 1919 due to the First World War.
1919–20	SL Div 1	42	10	7	25	34	74	27	22nd	R1					Arthur Wood	14	
1920–21	Div 3 (Note: Under a restructuring of the leagues, all members of the Southern League Division One were elevated to form the new Third Division of the expanded Football League. Gillingham thus avoided relegation despite having finished the previous season in last position.)	42	8	12	22	34	74	28	22nd (Note: There was no automatic relegation from the Football League until 1987. Gillingham thus avoided relegation despite finishing last.)	QR6					Tommy Hall	11	
1921–22	Div 3S (Note: The Football League Third Division North was formed in 1921, with the existing Third Division being re-designated the Third Division South.)	42	14	8	20	47	60	36	18th	R1					Charlie Freeman	14	
1922–23	Div 3S	42	15	7	20	51	57	37	16th	QR6					Tommy Hall; Horace Williams	11	
1923–24	Div 3S	42	12	13	17	43	58	37	15th	R1					Joe North	17	
1924–25	Div 3S	42	13	14	15	35	44	40	13th	QR6					Frank Marshall	11	
1925–26	Div 3S	42	17	8	17	53	49	42	10th	R2					Fred Brown	16	
1926–27	Div 3S	42	11	10	21	54	72	32	20th	R2					Bill Arblaster	18	
1927–28	Div 3S	42	13	11	18	62	81	37	16th	R3					Jonah Wilcox	28	
1928–29	Div 3S	42	10	9	23	43	83	29	22nd	R1					Arthur Dominy	14	
1929–30	Div 3S	42	11	8	23	51	80	30	21st	R1					Fred Cheesmur	18	
1930–31	Div 3S	42	14	10	18	61	76	38	16th	R2					Harry Loasby	22	
1931–32	Div 3S	42	10	8	24	40	82	28	21st	R1					Bill White	9	
1932–33	Div 3S	42	18	8	16	72	61	44	7th	R2					George Nicol	28	
1933–34	Div 3S	42	11	11	20	75	96	33	17th	R2			Third Division South Cup	R1	Sim Raleigh	18	
1934–35	Div 3S	42	11	13	18	55	75	35	20th	R1			Third Division South Cup	R1	Bill Baldwin	13	
1935–36	Div 3S	42	14	9	19	66	77	37	16th	R2			Third Division South Cup	R1	George Tadman	18	
1936–37	Div 3S	42	18	8	16	72	61	44	11th	R2			Third Division South Cup	R2	Jimmy Watson	21	
1937–38	Div 3S ↓	42	10	6	26	36	77	26	22nd (Note: Gillingham failed to be re-elected having finished in last position, and Ipswich Town were chosen to replace them in the Football League. Gillingham returned to the Southern League.)	R1			Third Division South Cup	R2	Jimmy Watson	13	
1938–39	SL	44	29	6	9	104	57	64	3rd	QR4			Southern League Cup	R2	Harry Rowley	41	
1939–40	SL	3	2	0	1	6	4	4	n/a (Note: The Southern League season was abandoned after three matches due to the outbreak of war in September. Beginning in November, Gillingham played in the Kent Regional League East, which like other wartime competitions is regarded as unofficial.)				Southern League Cup	R1	Harry Rowley	4	
No further competitive football was played between 1939 and 1945 due to the Second World War.
1945–46	KL	20	18	1	1	111	33	37	1st	QR4			Kent League Cup	W	Vic Hole	29	
1946–47	SL	31	20	6	5	103	45	47 (Note: Gillingham were awarded one point for an away fixture against Millwall that never took place.)	1st	R3			Southern League Cup	W	Hughie Russell	42	
1947–48	SL	34	21	5	8	81	43	47	2nd	R3			Southern League Cup	GS	Hughie Russell	23	
1948–49	SL	42	26	10	6	104	48	62	1st	QR4			Southern League Cup	SF	Hughie Russell	36	
1949–50	SL ↑	46	23	9	14	92	61	55	5th (Note: Gillingham were elected into the Football League as part of the expansion of the Third Division South from 22 teams to 24.)	R2			Southern League Cup	R2	Harold Williams	18	
1950–51	Div 3S	46	13	9	24	69	101	35	22nd	R2					Dave Thomas	21	
1951–52	Div 3S	46	11	13	22	71	81	35	22nd	R2					Derek Lewis; Dave Thomas	22	
1952–53	Div 3S	46	12	15	19	39	70	40	21st	R2					Trevor Long	11	
1953–54	Div 3S	46	19	10	17	61	66	48	10th	R1					Ernie Morgan	21	
1954–55	Div 3S	46	20	15	11	77	66	55	4th	R2					Ernie Morgan	33	
1955–56	Div 3S	46	19	10	17	61	66	48	10th	R1					Ernie Morgan	16	
1956–57	Div 3S	46	12	13	21	54	85	37	22nd	R2					Jim Taylor	16	
1957–58	Div 3S	46	13	9	24	52	81	35	22nd	R3					Ron Saunders	19	
1958–59	Div 4 (Note: Having finished in the lower half of the table, Gillingham were placed in the new Football League Fourth Division following the amalgamation of the Third Division South and Third Division North.)	46	20	9	17	82	77	49	11th	R1					Johnny Edgar	24	
1959–60	Div 4	46	21	10	15	74	69	52	7th	R3					Pat Terry	22	
1960–61	Div 4	46	15	13	18	64	66	43	15th	R3	R2				Pat Terry	22	
1961–62	Div 4	44	13	11	20	73	94	37	20th	R1	R1				Charlie Livesey	15	
1962–63	Div 4	46	22	13	11	71	49	57	5th (Note: Gillingham finished level on points with Mansfield Town, but missed out on promotion on goal average.)	R3	R1				George Francis	13	
1963–64	Div 4 ↑	46	23	14	9	59	30	60	1st (Note: Gillingham won the division on goal average.)	R1	R4				Brian Gibbs	18	
1964–65	Div 3	46	23	9	14	70	50	55	7th	R2	R1				Brian Gibbs	23	
1965–66	Div 3	46	22	8	16	62	54	52	6th	R1	R2				Brian Gibbs	24	
1966–67	Div 3	46	15	16	15	58	62	46	11th	R2	R2				Brian Gibbs	17	
1967–68	Div 3	46	18	12	16	59	63	48	11th	R1	R2				Brian Gibbs	16	
1968–69	Div 3	46	13	15	18	54	63	41	20th	R2	R1				Brian Yeo	18	
1969–70	Div 3	46	13	13	20	52	64	39	20th (Note: Gillingham finished with the same number of points as Bournemouth & Boscombe Athletic, but finished above them on goal average and thus escaped relegation.)	R5	R2				Mike Green	16	
1970–71	Div 3 ↓	46	10	13	23	42	67	33	24th	R1	R1				Mike Green	12	
1971–72	Div 4	46	16	13	17	61	67	45	13th	R3	R3				Brian Yeo	24	
1972–73	Div 4	46	19	11	16	63	58	49	9th	R1	R2				Damien Richardson	14	
1973–74	Div 4 ↑	46	25	12	9	90	49	62	2nd	R1	R2				Brian Yeo	32	
1974–75	Div 3	46	17	14	15	65	60	48	10th	R1	R1				Damien Richardson	21	
1975–76	Div 3	46	12	19	15	58	68	43	15th	R2	R2				Damien Richardson; Danny Westwood	12	
1976–77	Div 3	46	16	12	18	55	64	44	12th	R1	R2				Damien Richardson	18	
1977–78	Div 3	46	15	20	11	67	60	50	7th	R2	R1				Ken Price	20	
1978–79	Div 3	46	21	17	8	65	42	59	4th	R1	R1				Danny Westwood	19	
1979–80	Div 3	46	14	14	18	49	51	42	16th	R1	R2				Ken Price	17	
1980–81	Div 3	46	12	18	16	48	58	42	15th	R2	R2				Ken Price	13	
1981–82	Div 3	46	20	11	15	64	56	71 (Note: From the 1981–82 season, points were allocated on the basis of 3 for a win and 1 for a draw; previously only two points had been given for a win.)	6th	R4	R1		Football League Group Cup	GS	Ken Price; Dean White	14	
1982–83	Div 3	46	16	13	17	58	59	61	13th	R2	R3				Tony Cascarino	19	
1983–84	Div 3	46	20	10	16	74	69	70	8th	R4	R1	R1(S)			Dave Mehmet	17	
1984–85	Div 3	46	25	8	13	80	62	83	4th	R4	R2	R1(S)			Tony Cascarino	20	
1985–86	Div 3	46	22	13	11	81	54	79	5th	R3	R2	SF(S)			Tony Cascarino	21	
1986–87	Div 3	46	23	9	14	65	48	78	5th (Note: Gillingham qualified for the play-offs in the first year that these were staged, defeating Sunderland in the semi-final on away goals after a 6–6 aggregate score, and losing the final 2–0 to Swindon Town in a replay at Selhurst Park after a 2–2 aggregate over two legs.)	R3	R2	SF(S)	League play-offs	RU	Tony Cascarino	30	
1987–88	Div 3	46	14	17	15	77	61	59	13th	R3	R2	GS			Steve Lovell	27	
1988–89	Div 3 ↓	46	12	4	30	47	81	40	23rd	R1	R2	R1(S)			Steve Lovell	17	
1989–90	Div 4	46	17	11	18	46	48	62	14th	R1	R1	R1(S)			Steve Lovell	18	
1990–91	Div 4	46	12	11	16	57	60	54	15th	R1	R1	R1(S)			Steve Lovell	21	
1991–92	Div 4	42	15	12	15	63	53	57	11th	R1	R1	R1(S)			David Crown	24 (Note: Crown also scored one goal in a match against Aldershot which was declared void when that team resigned from the league before the end of the season.)	
1992–93	Div 3 (Note: On the formation of the FA Premier League, the Fourth Division was re-designated as the Third Division.)	42	9	13	20	48	64	40	21st	R3	R2	GS			David Crown	9	
1993–94	Div 3	42	12	15	15	44	51	51	16th	R2	R1	GS			Nicky Forster	18	
1994–95	Div 3	42	10	11	21	46	64	41	19th	R3	R1	R2(S)			Chris Pike	18	
1995–96	Div 3 ↑	46	22	17	7	49	20 (Note: Twenty goals remains a record for the lowest number of goals conceded in a 46 match Football League season.)	83	2nd	R3	R1	GS			Leo Fortune-West	15	
1996–97	Div 2	46	19	10	17	60	59	67	11th	R3	R4	R1(S)			Iffy Onuora	23	
1997–98	Div 2	46	19	13	14	52	47	70	8th (Note: Gillingham missed out on a place in the play-offs on goals scored, which took precedence over goal difference at that time.)	R1	R1	R1(S)			Ade Akinbiyi	22	
1998–99	Div 2	46	22	14	10	75	44	80	4th (Note: Having qualified for the play-offs, Gillingham defeated Preston North End 2–1 on aggregate in the semi-final, and in their first appearance at Wembley Stadium were beaten 3–1 on penalties by Manchester City, after a 2–2 draw.)	R1	R1	SF(S) (Note: Gillingham were defeated 1–0 by Millwall on the Golden goal rule, the only time this method of resolving a match was applied to a Gillingham match.)	League play-offs	RU	Carl Asaba	22	
1999–2000	Div 2 ↑	46	25	10	11	79	48	85	3rd (Note: Qualifying again for the play-offs, Gillingham defeated Stoke City 5–3 on aggregate in the semi-final, and beat Wigan Athletic 3–2 after extra time in the final to gain promotion to the second level of English football for the first time in their history.)	QF (Note: This achievement in reaching the quarter-finals represents the furthest progress Gillingham have ever made in the FA Cup.)	R2	R1(S)	League play-offs	W	Robert Taylor	18	
2000–01	Div 1	46	13	16	17	47	61	66	13th	R4	R2	—			Marlon King	15	
2001–02	Div 1	46	18	10	18	64	67	64	12th	R5	R3	—			Marlon King	20	
2002–03	Div 1	46	16	14	16	56	65	62	11th (Note: This position, equivalent to 31st place in the English football league system, represents Gillingham's highest ever league finish.)	R4	R3	—			Paul Shaw	13	
2003–04	Div 1	46	14	9	23	48	67	51	21st (Note: Gillingham finished with the same number of points as Walsall, but avoided relegation due to a superior goal difference.)	R4	R3	—			Patrick Agyemang; Paul Shaw; Mamady Sidibe; Danny Spiller	6	
2004–05	Champ (Note: The First Division was renamed the Football League Championship as part of a new sponsorship deal in the 2004–05 season.) ↓	46	12	14	20	45	66	50	22nd (Note: Gillingham finished on the same number of points as Crewe Alexandra, but were relegated on account of an inferior goal difference to the recently renamed third tier, Football League One.)	R3	R1	—			Darius Henderson	9	
2005–06	Lge 1	46	16	12	18	50	64	60	14th	R1	R3	R2(S)			Darren Byfield	14	
2006–07	Lge 1	46	17	8	21	56	77	59	16th	R2	R1	R1(SE)			Michael Flynn	12	
2007–08	Lge 1 ↓	46	11	13	22	44	73	46	22nd	R1	R1	SF(S)			Chris Dickson	11	
2008–09	Lge 2 ↑	46	21	12	13	58	55	75	5th (Note: By finishing 5th, Gillingham reached the play-offs, then defeated Rochdale 2–1 on aggregate in the semi-final, and beat Shrewsbury Town 1–0 in the final to gain promotion.)	R3	R1	R2(S)	League play-offs	W	Simeon Jackson	21	
2009–10	Lge 1 ↓	46	12	14	20	48	64	50	21st	R3	R2	R2(S)			Simeon Jackson	17	
2010–11	Lge 2	46	17	17	12	67	57	68	8th	R1	R1	R1(S)			Cody McDonald	25	
2011–12	Lge 2	46	20	10	16	79	62	70	8th	R3	R1	R2(SE)			Danny Kedwell	14	
2012–13	Lge 2 ↑	46	23	14	9	66	39	83	1st	R2	R2	R1(SE)			Danny Kedwell	16	
2013–14	Lge 1	46	15	8	23	60	79	53	17th	R1	R1	R1(SE)			Cody McDonald	17	
2014–15	Lge 1	46	16	14	16	65	66	62	12th	R1	R2	F(S)			Cody McDonald	18	
2015–16	Lge 1	46	19	12	15	71	56	69	9th	R1	R2	QF(S)			Bradley Dack	15	
2016–17	Lge 1	46	12	14	20	59	79	50	20th	R1	R3	GS			Josh Wright	13	
2017–18	Lge 1	46	13	17	16	50	55	56	17th	R2	R1	R2S			Tom Eaves	18	
2018–19	Lge 1	46	15	10	21	61	72	55	13th	R4	R1	GS			Tom Eaves	22	
2019–20	Lge 1	35	12	15	8	42	34	51	10th (Note: The 2019–20 season was curtailed due to the COVID-19 pandemic, with league positions decided on a points-per-game basis. Gillingham averaged 1.46 points from 35 games.)	R3	R1	GS			Alex Jakubiak; Brandon Hanlan	7	
2020–21	Lge 1	46	19	10	17	63	60	67	10th	R2	R3	R2			Vadaine Oliver	20	
2021–22	Lge 1 ↓	46	8	16	22	35	69	40	21st	R1	R2	GS			Vadaine Oliver	11	
2022–23	Lge 2	46	14	13	19	36	49	55	17th	R3	R4	GS			Tom Nichols	6	
2023–24	Lge 2	46	18	10	18	46	57	64	12th	R3	R2	GS			Connor Mahoney	7	
2024–25	Lge 2	46	14	16	16	41	46	58	17th	R1	R1	GS			Jayden Clarke	7	
2025–26	Lge 2	46	13	14	19	53	72	53	17th	R1	R1	GS			Bradley Dack	7	

== Key ==
Winners	Runners up	Promoted	Relegated

Division shown in bold when it changes due to promotion, relegation or league reorganisation. Top scorer shown in bold when he set or equalled a club record.

Key to league record:
P – Games played
W – Games won
D – Games drawn
L – Games lost
GF – Goals for
GA – Goals against
Pts – Points
Pos – Final position

Key to rounds:
QR1 – First qualifying round
QR2 – Second qualifying round, etc.
RInt – Intermediate round
R1 – First round
R2 – Second round, etc.
QF – Quarter-final
SF – Semi-final
Grp – Group stage
GrpS – Group stage (Southern section)
R1S – First round (Southern section)
R2S – Second round (Southern section), etc.
R1SE – First round (South Eastern section)
SQF – Quarter-final (Southern section)
n/a – Not applicable

Key to divisions:
Champ – EFL Championship
Lge 1 – EFL League One
Lge 2 – EFL League Two
Div 1 – Football League First Division
Div 2 – Football League Second Division
Div 3 – Football League Third Division
Div 3S – Football League Third Division South
Div 4 – Football League Fourth Division
SL – Southern League
KL – Kent League
TMC – Thames and Medway Combination
