= List of Gillingham F.C. records and statistics =

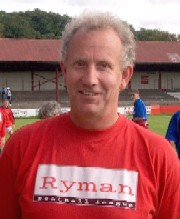
Ron Hillyard, Gillingham's appearance record holder, played a total of 655 games in a 17-year career with the club.

Gillingham Football Club is an English professional association football club based in Gillingham, Kent, playing in EFL League Two, the fourth level of the English football league system, as of the 2024–25 season. The club was formed in 1893 as New Brompton F.C., a name which was retained until 1913, and has played home matches at Priestfield Stadium throughout its history. The club joined the Football League in 1920, was voted out of the league in favour of Ipswich Town at the end of the 1937–38 season, but returned to the league 12 years later after it was expanded from 88 to 92 clubs. Between 2000 and 2005, Gillingham played in the second tier of the English league for the only time in the club's history, achieving a highest league finish of eleventh place in 2002–03.

The record for most games played for the club is held by Ron Hillyard, who made 655 appearances between 1974 and 1991. Brian Yeo is the club's record goalscorer, scoring 149 goals during his Gillingham career. Andrew Crofts holds the record for the most international caps gained as a Gillingham player, having made 12 appearances for Wales. The highest transfer fee ever paid by the club is the £600,000 paid to Reading for Carl Asaba in 1998, and the highest fee received is the £1,500,000 paid by Manchester City for Robert Taylor in 1999. The highest attendance recorded at Priestfield was 23,002 for the visit of Queens Park Rangers in 1948.

All figures are correct as of April 2025.

== Honours and achievements ==
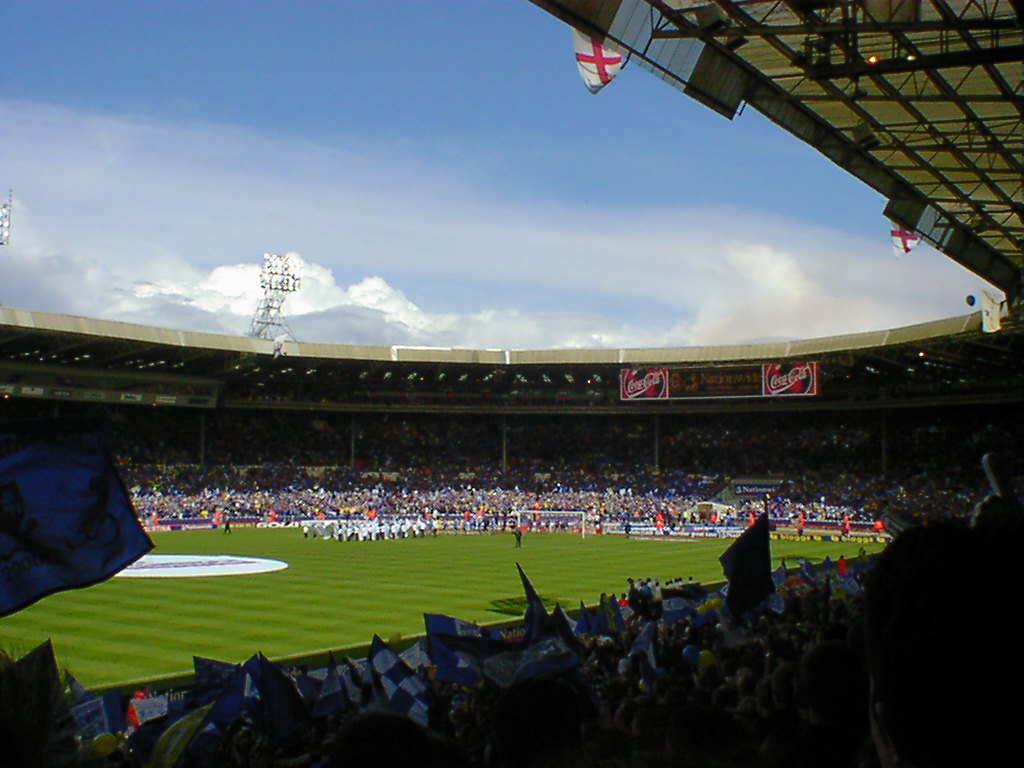
Gillingham fans at the 2000 play-off final

Gillingham have won two major honours in English football; first the Football League Fourth Division title in the 1963–64 season and then the Football League Two title in the 2012–13 season. The club has also achieved promotion on four other occasions, most recently in the 2008–09 season, when a 1–0 victory over Shrewsbury Town in the 2009 Football League Two play-off final at Wembley Stadium secured a return to League One following relegation the previous season.

Gillingham's only previous victory at Wembley (at the original Wembley Stadium) came in the 1999–2000 season, when a 3–2 victory over Wigan Athletic in the Second Division play-off final clinched promotion to the second tier of English football for the first time in Gillingham's history. Between 1938 and 1950, when the club played outside the Football League, Gillingham won the Southern Football League championship on two occasions and the Kent League once.

=== The Football League ===
- Second Division (level 3):
  - Promotion (1): 1999–2000^{[A]}
- Third Division / Fourth Division / Football League Two (level 4):
  - Winners (2): 1963–64, 2012–13
  - Promotion (3): 1973–74^{[B]}, 1995–96^{[B]}, 2008–09^{[C]}

=== Other honours ===
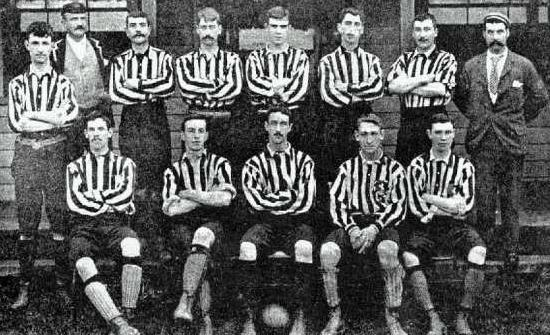
The New Brompton team which won the Southern League Division Two championship in the 1894–95 season

- Southern League:
  - Division One champions (2): 1946–47, 1948–49
  - Division Two champions (1): 1894–95
  - Southern League Cup winners (1): 1946–47
- Kent League:
  - Champions (1): 1945–46
  - Kent League Cup winners (1): 1945–46

=== National cup competitions ===
- FA Cup:
  - Quarter finalists: 1999–2000
- League Cup:
  - Fourth round (round of 16): 1963–64, 1996–97 and 2022-23

== Player records ==
=== Age ===
- Youngest first team player: Luke Freeman, 15 years 233 days (against Barnet, 10 November 2007).
- Oldest first team player: Glenn Morris, 42 years 134 days (against Shrewsbury Town, 3 May 2026).

=== Appearances ===
All competitive peacetime first team matches are included. Statistics correct as of 5 April 2025. Appearances as substitute are in brackets. Players who played for the club prior to 1920 or between 1938 and 1950, when the club played in the Southern League and Kent League rather than the Football League, have appearances in those competitions included in their totals.

#	Name	Years	League^{a}	FA Cup	League Cup^{b}	Other	Total
1	Ron Hillyard	1974–1991	563 (0)	34 (0)	44 (0)	14 (0)	655 (0)
2	John Simpson	1957–1972	571 (0)	26 (0)	19 (0)	0 (0)	616 (0)
3	Mark Weatherly	1974–1989	458 (49)	33 (5)	38 (3)	14 (1)	543 (58)
4	Jimmy Boswell	1946–1958	470 (0)	36 (0)	17 (0)	0 (0)	523 (0)
5	Charlie Marks	1943–1957	392 (0)	20 (0)	22 (0)	0 (0)	434 (0)
6	Max Ehmer	2014–2020; 2021–2025	375 (8)	23 (1)	15 (0)	15 (2)	428 (11)
7	Dick Tydeman	1969–1977; 1981–1984	371 (3)	22 (0)	23 (1)	3 (0)	419 (4)
8	Paul Smith	1997–2005; 2005–2006	345 (4)	21 (0)	18 (0)	12 (2)	396 (6)
9	Jock Robertson	1919–1933	365 (0)	30 (0)	0 (0)	0 (0)	395 (0)
10	Brian Yeo	1963–1975	356 (11)	16 (0)	15 (0)	0 (0)	387 (11)

a. Includes Football League, Southern League and Kent League
b. Includes Football League Cup, Southern League Cup and Kent League Cup

=== Goalscorers ===
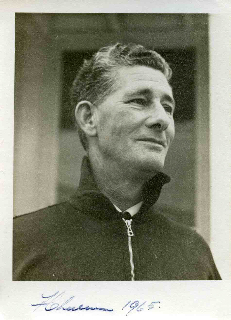
Fred Cheesmur scored six goals in a match in 1930, a club record haul for a match in The Football League.

- Most goals in a season: Hughie Russell, 42 goals (including 33 Southern League goals) in the 1946–47 season.
- Most goals in a season during Football League membership: Brian Yeo, 32 goals (including 31 League goals) in the 1973–74 season.
- Most Football League goals in a season:
  - Brian Yeo, 31 goals in Division Four in the 1973–74 season.
  - Ernie Morgan, 31 goals in Division Three South in the 1954–55 season.
- Most goals in a Football League match: 6, Fred Cheesmur (against Merthyr Town, 26 April 1930).
- Most goals in any match: 9, Hughie Russell (against Gloucester City, Southern League, 9 November 1946).
- Fastest hat-trick: Jimmy Scarth, three goals in two minutes and 30 seconds (against Leyton Orient, 1 November 1952). At the time this was the fastest hat-trick in Football League history, a record which lasted until 2004.

==== Top goalscorers ====
All competitive first team matches are included. Appearances, including those as substitute, are in brackets. Players who played for the club prior to 1920 or between 1938 and 1950, when the club played in the Southern League and Kent League rather than the Football League, have goals in those competitions included in their totals.

#	Name	Years	League^{a}	FA Cup	League Cup^{b}	Other	Total
1	Brian Yeo	1963–1975	136 (356)	4 (16)	9 (15)	0 (0)	149 (387)
2	Hughie Russell	1946–1952	106 (186)	12 (23)	2 (0)	0 (0)	120 (209)
3	Tug Wilson	1936–1949	91 (211)	5 (16)	17 (25)	0 (1)	113 (253)
4	Tony Cascarino^{[D]}	1981–1987	78 (219)	11 (17)	9 (18)	12 (15)	110 (269)
5	Brian Gibbs	1962–1969	101 (259)	3 (9)	6 (16)	0 (0)	110 (284)
6	Steve Lovell	1986–1993	94 (233)	5 (10)	2 (17)	3 (15)	104 (275)
7	Damien Richardson	1972–1991	94 (323)	5 (14)	3 (20)	0 (0)	102 (357)
8	Ken Price	1976–1983	78 (255)	7 (21)	4 (18)	0 (0)	89 (294)
9	Cody McDonald	2010–2011; 2013–2017	77 (198)	1 (7)	1 (6)	2 (9)	81 (220)
10	Ernie Morgan^{[D]}	1953–1957	73 (155)	4 (8)	0 (0)	0 (0)	77 (163)
11	Danny Westwood	1975–1982	74 (211)	1 (12)	2 (12)	0 (3)	77 (238)

a. Includes Football League, Southern League and Kent League
b. Includes Football League Cup, Southern League Cup and Kent League Cup

=== International caps ===
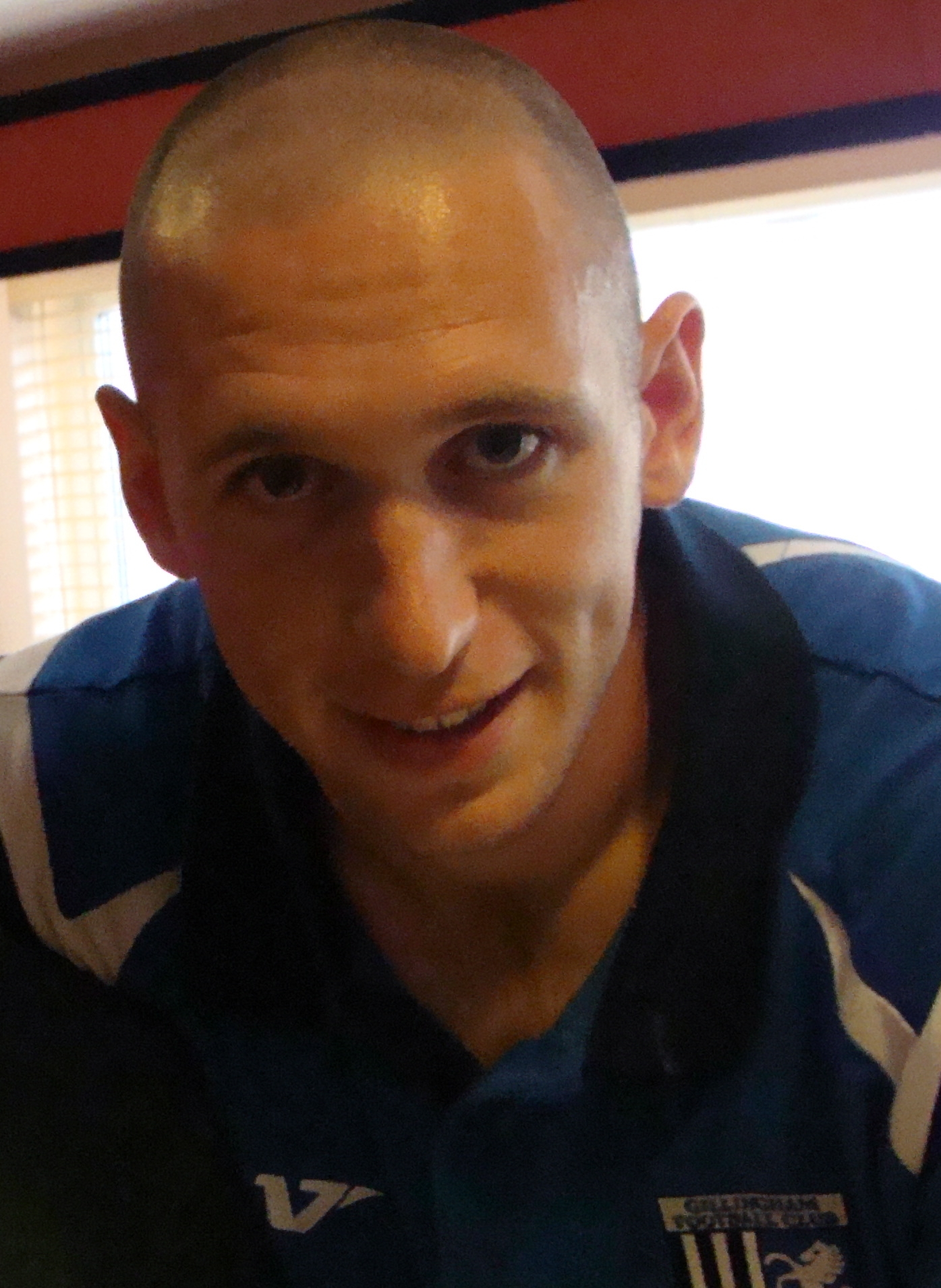
Andrew Crofts, the club's international caps record holder

- First capped player: Damien Richardson for Republic of Ireland on 6 June 1973^{[E]}
- Most international caps while a Gillingham player: Andrew Crofts, 12 for Wales
- First Gillingham player to appear in the World Cup finals: Brent Sancho, for Trinidad and Tobago against Sweden on 10 June 2006

=== Transfer fees ===
==== Record transfer fees paid ====
#	Name	Fee	Paid to	Date	Notes
1	Carl Asaba	£600,000	Reading	29 August 1998	
2	Robert Taylor	£500,000	Brentford	1 August 1998	
3	Paul Shaw	£450,000	Millwall	4 July 2000	
4=	Marlon King	£250,000	Barnet	28 June 2000	
4=	Ade Akinbiyi	£250,000	Norwich City	6 January 1997	
4=	Chris Hope	£250,000	Scunthorpe United	4 July 2000	

==== Record transfer fees received ====
#	Name	Fee	Received from	Date	Notes
1	Robert Taylor	£1,500,000	Manchester City	29 November 1999	
2	Ade Akinbiyi	£1,200,000	Bristol City	1 June 1998	
3	Marlon King	£950,000	Nottingham Forest	27 November 2003	
4	Bradley Dack	£750,000	Blackburn Rovers	27 June 2017	
5	Jimmy Corbett	£525,000	Blackburn Rovers	21 May 1998	

Some media sources claimed that the transfer fee paid by Southampton for Paulo Gazzaniga in 2012 was higher than that paid for Taylor, but the fee was not officially disclosed by either club.

== Managerial records ==
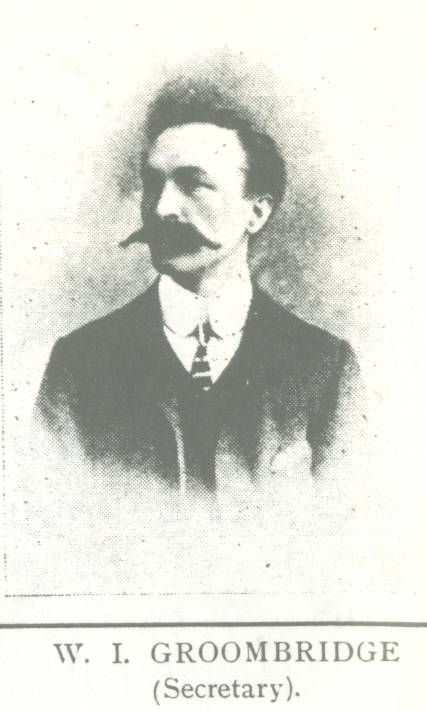
William Ironside Groombridge, the club's first manager

- First manager: William Ironside Groombridge (appointed secretary-manager in 1896)
- Longest serving manager: Archie Clark, managed the club from 1939 until 1957

== Club records ==
=== Goals ===
- Most Football League goals scored in a season: 90 in 46 matches, Division Four, 1973–74.
- Fewest Football League goals scored in a season: 34 in 42 matches, Division Three, 1920–21.
- Most Football League goals conceded in a season: 101 in 46 matches, Division Three South, 1950–51.
- Fewest Football League goals conceded in a season: 20 in 46 matches, Division Three, 1995–96, a league record for a 46-game season.
- Most league goals scored in a season at any level: 111 in 20 matches, Kent League, 1945–46.
- Fewest league goals scored in a season at any level: 20 in 34 matches, Southern League Division One, 1905–06.

=== Points ===
- Most points in a Football League season:
  - Two points for a win: 62 in 46 games, Division Four, 1973–74.
  - Three points for a win: 85 in 46 games, Division Two, 1999–2000.
- Fewest points in a Football League season:
  - Two points for a win: 26 in 44 games, Division Three South, 1937–38.
  - Three points for a win: 40 in 42 games, Division Three, 1992–93, and 40 in 46 games, Division Three, 1988–89.
- Most points in a season at any level:
  - Two points for a win: 64 in 44 games, Southern League, 1938–39.
- Fewest points in a season at any level:
  - Two points for a win: 19 in 28 games, Southern League Division One, 1900–01.

=== Matches ===
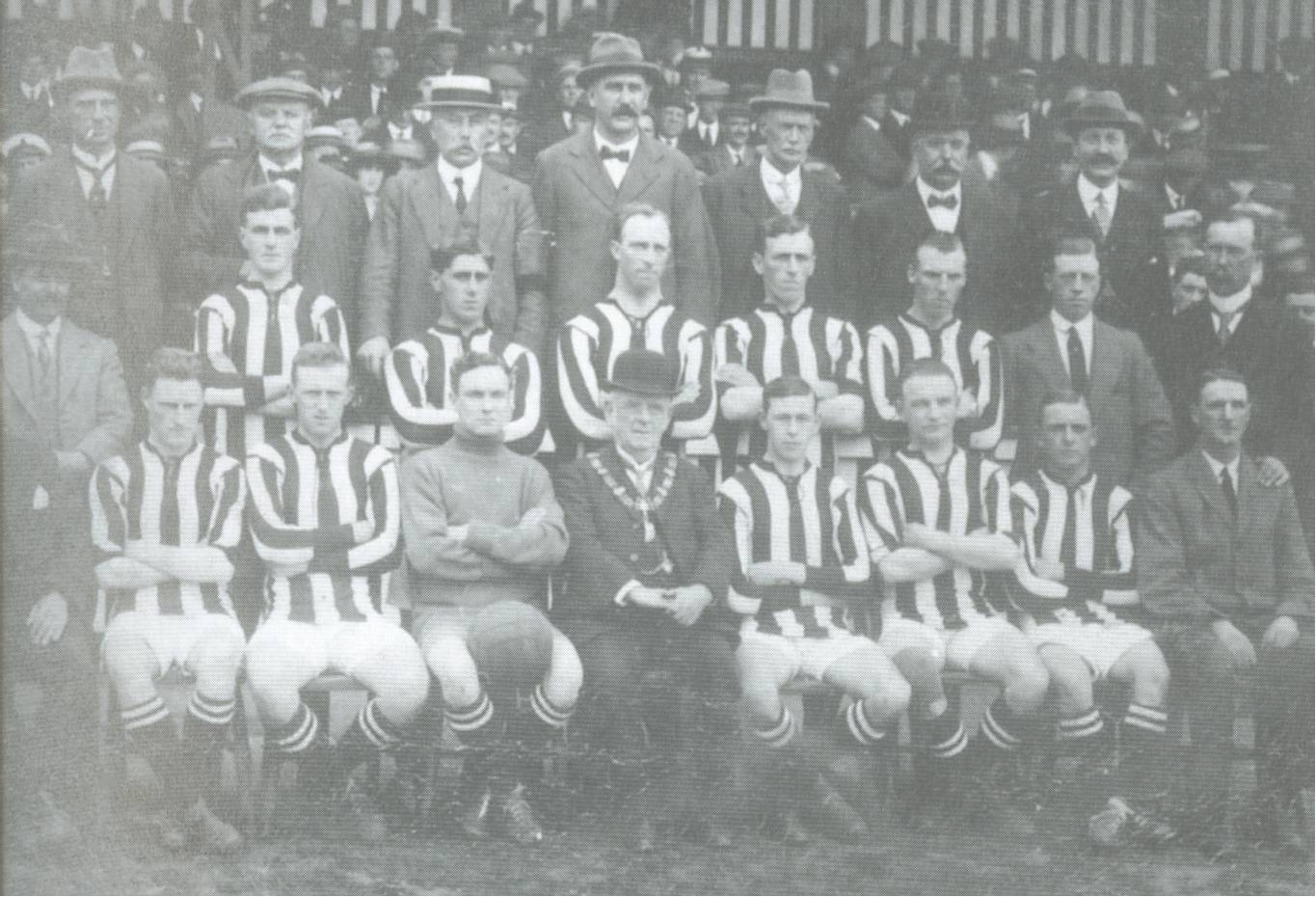
The Gillingham team and officials pictured before the club's first ever Football League match in 1920

==== Firsts ====
- First match: New Brompton 1–5 Woolwich Arsenal reserves, friendly, 2 September 1893^{[F]}
- First FA Cup match: Ilford 6–3 New Brompton, first qualifying round, 14 October 1893
- First Southern League match: Sheppey United 0–6 New Brompton, Division Two, 15 September 1894
- First Football League match: Gillingham 1–1 Southampton, Division Three South, 28 August 1920
- First Football League Cup match: Gillingham 1–1 Preston North End, second round, 19 October 1960

==== Record wins ====
- Record Football League win: 10–0 against Chesterfield in Division Three, 5 September 1987.
- Record FA Cup win: 10–1 against Gorleston, first round, 16 November 1957.
- Record win in any competitive match: 12–1 against Gloucester City in the Southern League, 9 November 1946.

==== Record defeat ====
- Record Football League defeat: 0–8 against Luton Town in Division Three South, 13 April 1929
- Record FA Cup defeat: 3–9 against Sutton United, fourth qualifying round, 3 November 1945.

=== Attendances ===
- Highest home attendance: 23,002 against Queens Park Rangers, FA Cup third round, 10 January 1948.
- Highest Football League attendance: 20,128 against Millwall, Division Three South, 2 September 1950.

== Notes ==
A. Promoted via the play-off system after finishing in third place

B. Promoted automatically by finishing in second place on both occasions

C. Promoted via the play-off system after finishing in fifth place

D. Cascarino is placed higher than Gibbs, and Morgan higher than Westwood, as they reached their goals totals in fewer matches.

E. The club has in the past claimed that goalkeeper Freddie Fox made his one appearance for England in May 1925 while on Gillingham's books. Although he was still with Gillingham when the team selection was announced, he was transferred to Millwall days later, roughly four weeks before the match actually took place.

F. This was the first match for the club's first team, but it was preceded by the first match for the club's reserve team, which occurred earlier on the same day.
