= Dorling =

Dorling is a surname. Notable people with the surname include:

- Christopher Dorling (retired 1987), co-founder of Dorling Kindersley publishers
- Danny Dorling (born 1968), British geographer
- George Dorling (1918 – 1987), English footballer
- Henry Dorling (died 1873), first clerk of Epsom racecourse, and stepfather of Mrs Beeton
- H. Taprell Dorling (1883 – 1968), British sailor, author and journalist
- Lionel Dorling (1860 - 1925), British Army officer
- Philip Dorling (active 2008 - ), Australian writer
- T.J. Dorling, designer of Scorpion (dinghy)

== See also ==
- Dorling Kindersley, UK-founded international publishing company
- Durling, another surname
