= Burtenshaw =

Burtenshaw is a surname. Notable people with the surname include:

- Bill Burtenshaw (1925–2010), English footballer
- Charlie Burtenshaw (1922–2013), English footballer
- Norman Burtenshaw (1926–2023), English football referee
- Ronan Burtenshaw, Tribune magazine editor
- Steve Burtenshaw (1935–2022), English footballer and manager
- Van Burtenshaw (born 1957/1958), American politician
