= 1939–40 Gillingham F.C. season =

English football club season

Gillingham
1939–40 season
- Chairman: Jack Knight
- Manager: Archie Clark
- Southern League Division One: Season abandoned
Home colours

At the start of the 1939–40 English football season, Gillingham F.C. competed in the Southern League Division One. It was the second season of the team's second spell in the league; the club had lost its place in the national Football League in 1938 after eighteen seasons. Prior to the season, the club appointed Archie Clark as player-manager. After Gillingham had played three matches, the Southern League season was abandoned due to the outbreak of the Second World War; following two months of inactivity, Gillingham joined the Kent Regional League, competing against mostly minor local teams. This competition was also abandoned without being completed and Gillingham did not play another competitive match for four years.

== Background and pre-season ==
After playing in the Southern League since 1894, Gillingham were among the founder members of the Football League Third Division in 1920, which was renamed the Third Division South when a parallel Third Division North was created a year later. After finishing in the bottom two places in the 1937–38 season, requiring them to apply for re-election to the League, Gillingham were voted out of the competition. The club returned to the Southern League and finished third in its First Division in the 1938–39 season. Gillingham applied to re-join the Football League at the first opportunity, but the application was rejected.

In August, Gillingham appointed former Everton and Tranmere Rovers player Archie Clark as player-manager, replacing Bill Harvey in the managerial role.

== Southern League Division One ==
Gillingham's first game of the season was away to Tunbridge Wells Rangers and resulted in a 2–0 victory.

On 2 September, Gillingham lost 1–0 away to Worcester City. The following day, Britain entered the Second World War and the Southern League season was quickly abandoned.

=== Southern League match details ===
Key

- In the result column, Gillingham's score is shown first
- H = Home match
- A = Away match
- pen. = Penalty kick
- o.g. = Own goal

Results

Date	Opponents	Result	Goalscorers	Attendance
25 August 1939	Tunbridge Wells Rangers (A)	2–0	Wilson, Rowley	not recorded
30 August 1939	Newport County reserves (H)	4–3	Rowley (3), Scott	not recorded
2 September 1939	Worcester City (A)	0–1		not recorded

== Kent Regional League (Eastern Group) ==
After the suspension of major competitions, a number of temporary leagues were formed; due to government-imposed travel restrictions, these competitions were organised on a localised basis. Gillingham joined the Kent Regional League (Eastern Group) with other teams from the eastern part of the county of Kent; Tunbridge Wells Rangers were the only other Southern League team to join, but they subsequently withdrew. The other clubs had all begun the season in the lower-level Kent League with the exception of Shorts Sports, who were a works team from Rochester. Teams often fielded guest players and statistics from the competition are regarded as unofficial and not part of players' career records.

Gillingham's first match for two months took place on 4 November away to Margate and resulted in a 1–1 draw.

Gillingham's final match of the season was a 7–0 victory away to Maidstone United; the away match with Ramsgate Grenville was one of a number of scheduled games which were never played.

=== Kent Regional League match details ===
Key

- In the result column, Gillingham's score is shown first
- H = Home match
- A = Away match
- pen. = Penalty kick
- o.g. = Own goal

Results

Date	Opponents	Result	Goalscorers	Attendance
4 November 1939	Margate (A)	1–1	Hickson	not recorded
18 November 1939	Lloyds Paper Mills (H)	4–0	Day (2), Campbell, Herbert	not recorded
25 November 1939	Canterbury Waverley (A)	7–4	Scott (2), Walsh (2), Hickson, Lee, Piper	not recorded
2 December 1939	Dover (H)	5–2	Walsh (3), Fowler, Lee	not recorded
9 December 1939	Sittingbourne (A)	5–1	Hickson (2), Walsh (2), Herbert	not recorded
16 December 1939	Margate (H)	10–0	Hickson (5), Herbert (2), Campbell, Lee, Walsh (pen.)	not recorded
26 December 1939	Maidstone United (H)	5–1	Herbert (2), Lee (2), Golding	not recorded
6 January 1940	Canterbury Waverley (H)	3–0	Wilson (pen.), Lee, Hickson	not recorded
17 February 1940	Shorts Sports (H)	4–3	Jackson (2), Lee, Hickson	not recorded
24 February 1940	Aylesford Paper Mills (H)	7–2	Lee (3), Keenan (2), Wilson, Herbert (pen.)	not recorded
9 March 1940	Dover (A)	5–3	Wilson (2), Herbert, Hickson, Lee	not recorded
16 March 1940	Ramsgate Grenville (H)	3–3	Herbert (2), Lee	not recorded
22 March 1940	Ashford Town (A)	3–4	Hickson (2), Herbert	not recorded
23 March 1940	Ashford Town (H)	6–3	Herbert (3, 2 pens.), Lee, Golding, Hickson	not recorded
6 April 1940	Aylesford Paper Mills (A)	3–1	Hickson (2), Lee	not recorded
10 April 1940	Shorts Sports (A)	0–2		not recorded
20 April 1940	Lloyds Paper Mills (A)	7–2	Hickson (4), Batchelor (2), Herbert	not recorded
27 April 1940	Sittingbourne (H)	6–0	Wilson (3), Bryant (2), Batchelor	not recorded
1 May 1940	Maidstone United (A)	7–0	Hickson (3), Lee (3), Wood	not recorded

== Aftermath ==
The Kent Regional League season was abandoned with a number of games unplayed. Gillingham effectively ceased operations and did not play another competitive match until 1944.
