= Jimmy Boswell =

English footballer and manager

Personal information
- Full name: James Boswell
- Date of birth: 13 March 1922
- Place of birth: Chester, England
- Date of death: 25 May 2010 (aged 88)
- Place of death: Stafford, England
- Position: Wing half

Senior career*
Years	Team	Apps	(Gls)
	Chester	0	(0)
- Sheffield Wednesday (wartime guest)
1946–1958	Gillingham	470	(6)
1958–1959	Gravesend & Northfleet		
1959–1961	Tonbridge		
1961–?	Canterbury City		

Managerial career
- 1966: Gillingham (caretaker)
- Chatham Town
- * Club domestic league appearances and goals as of 4/10/2008

James Boswell (13 March 1922 – 25 May 2010) was an English professional footballer. He played for Gillingham from 1946 until 1958, making 342 appearances in the English Football League, and appeared in more FA Cup matches than any other player in the club's history.

== Career ==
Born in Chester, Boswell joined local football club Chester F.C. upon leaving school, initially as an amateur. He remained with the club until the outbreak of the Second World War, but never made it to the club's first team. During the war he served with the Royal Engineers and also made appearances as a guest player for Sheffield Wednesday during unofficial wartime competitions. He was later posted to Barton Stacey in Hampshire, where he helped his unit's football team win a major Army Football Association trophy. Upon leaving the army in 1946 he joined Gillingham, who at the time were playing in the Kent League. Gillingham manager Archie Clark also signed four other players who had served with Boswell at Barton Stacey and played alongside him in the unit football team, namely Jackie Briggs, George Forrester, Hughie Russell and Vic Hole.

Boswell missed only two matches during the 1946–47 season as Gillingham won the Kent League championship by a margin of one point. The following season the club played in the Southern Football League and Boswell was again a regular as the team finished in second place. In the 1948–49 season Gillingham won the Southern League championship. By the time the club was elected back into the English Football League in 1950 Boswell had played over 100 times, and had become the team's captain. He remained one of the club's most consistent players until 1958, playing over 40 times in each season to take his total number of appearances to more than 500. He also played 36 times in the FA Cup, a club record.

At the end of the 1957–58 season Boswell, now aged 36, left Gillingham to play for non-league team Gravesend & Northfleet. He later played for Tonbridge and Canterbury City before retiring. In 1964 he returned to Gillingham as team trainer, a position he held for five years. In January 1966 he took over as caretaker manager after the resignation of Freddie Cox, and guided the team to two victories before stepping down upon the arrival of new manager Basil Hayward. He also had a spell as manager of non-league Chatham Town, and coached the football team of the Kent Police. In later life he lived in the Lordswood area of Chatham, before moving to Stafford to be nearer relatives, where he died in 2010.
