= Archie Clark =

Archie Clark or Archibald Clark may refer to:

- Archibald Clark (politician) (1805–1875), New Zealand MP
- Archie Clark (basketball) (born 1941), American retired basketball player
- Archie Clark (footballer) (1904–1967), English football player and manager

== See also ==
- Archibald S. Clarke (1788–1821), U.S. Representative from New York
