= George Briggs =

George Briggs may refer to:

- George Briggs (sealer) (fl. 1816), English convict and sealer in Van Diemen's Land
- George N. Briggs (1796–1861), seven-term Governor of Massachusetts
- George Briggs (New York politician) (1805–1869), United States Representative from New York
- G. W. Briggs (George Wallace Briggs, 1875–1959), English hymn writer and Anglican clergyman
- George Edward Briggs (1893–1985), British botanist
- George Briggs (footballer) (1903–1972), English footballer
- George Briggs (bishop) (1910–2004), Anglican bishop
- Harry Briggs (footballer, born 1923) (George H. Briggs, 1923–2005), English footballer
- George Briggs (army) (1808–1875), major-general in the Madras Artillery
- George Briggs (Oregon politician), member of the Oregon Territorial Legislature, 1855
