= 1894–95 New Brompton F.C. season =

English football club season

New Brompton
1894–95 season
- Chairman: Horace Croneen
- Southern League Division Two: 1st
- FA Cup: Third qualifying round
- Top goalscorer: League: Arthur Rule (18); All: Arthur Rule (22)
- Highest home attendance: c. 8,000 vs Chatham (3 November 1894)
- Lowest home attendance: c. 300 vs Old St Stephen's (1 December 1894)
Home colours

During the 1894–95 English football season, New Brompton F.C. (since 1912 called Gillingham F.C.) competed in the Southern Football League Division Two. It was the first season in which the team took part in a league competition. The club had been formed a year earlier but in its inaugural season played only friendly matches and games in the qualifying rounds of the FA Cup and FA Amateur Cup. In 1894, New Brompton turned professional and joined the newly-formed Southern League. The team dominated Division Two of the new league, winning all but one of their matches, and gained promotion to Division One by winning an end-of-season "test match" against Swindon Town, who had finished bottom of the higher division.

New Brompton also entered the FA Cup, reaching the third qualifying round. The team played 15 competitive matches, winning 13, drawing none, and losing two. Arthur Rule was the team's top goalscorer; he scored 18 goals in the regular league season and 4 in the test match. Harry Buckland and Alf Meager made the most appearances, playing in every match. The highest attendance recorded at the club's home, the Athletic Ground, was approximately 8,000 for the visit of near-neighbours Chatham in the FA Cup.

== Background and pre-season ==
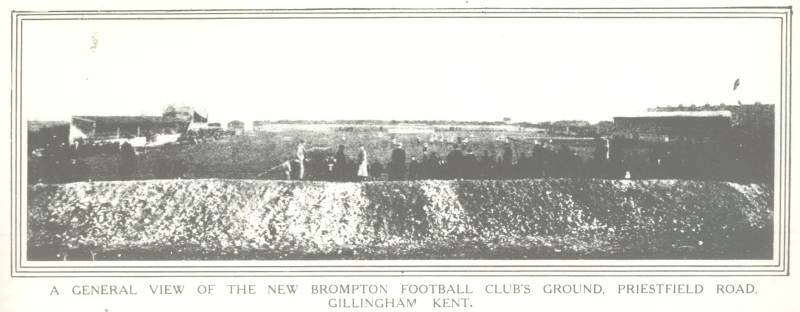
A view of the club's home ground in 1906. In 1894, only the spectator accommodation on the left in this photograph had been built.

The New Brompton club was formed in May 1893 by local businessmen keen to organise an association football club which could compete in national, rather than simply local, competitions. During the 1893–94 season, New Brompton entered the FA Cup and FA Amateur Cup, being eliminated in the qualifying rounds of both competitions, and played many friendly matches.

The Southern League was formed in 1894 by many leading clubs in the south of England, at a time when the ostensibly national Football League included only one club outside of the midlands and north. Keen to secure a regular schedule of high-quality matches, the New Brompton committee, led by chairman H.G. Croneen, applied to join the new league. The club was invited to join and allocated a place in Division Two, the lower of the league's two divisions, because near-neighbours Chatham had already been placed in Division One. Days earlier, New Brompton had switched from amateur to professional status, with the players to be paid 12 shillings per match (equivalent to £73 in 2021).

Many players from the previous season agreed to professional terms and remained. The club also signed Joe Dickenson, a player born in Chatham, who had last played for Bolton Wanderers of the Football League First Division and been in the Bolton team which lost to Notts County in the 1894 FA Cup final. The concept of a manager did not yet exist; significant team decisions were made by the committee or by David Hutcheson, the team captain, and the club employed a trainer called Murray. The players wore black and white striped shirts and black shorts. Ahead of the new season, New Brompton played a friendly against Barking Swifts and won 17–0; more than a century later this remained the highest score ever achieved in any match by the club. New Brompton were seen as strong contenders for the championship of the division: a writer for the Middlesex and Buckinghamshire Advertiser stated that "according to some who profess to speak with authority, the Bromptonians are likely to be at the head of the Leagueists."

== Southern League ==
The New Brompton team pictured before the first match of the season. Back row, left to right: Ashdown, Carr (referee), Jenner, Pellatt, James, Meager, Auld, Murray (trainer). Front row: Manning, Buckland, Hutcheson, Rule, Dickenson

New Brompton's first Southern League game was away to Sheppey United on 15 September 1894. In front of approximately 3,000 spectators, New Brompton were forced to begin with only ten players as goalkeeper A. Russell failed to arrive. The team played with no goalkeeper for around ten minutes until the forward Alf Jenner assumed the position and a reserve player took to the field. New Brompton emerged victorious by a score of 6–0, Hutcheson scoring a hat-trick. The first game at New Brompton's home, the Athletic Ground, took place a week later and resulted in a 4–0 victory over Uxbridge, who played the whole game with only ten men.

League play did not resume until 1 December, when New Brompton played Old St Stephen's; Fred Manning and Arthur Rule each scored twice in a 5–2 win described by the Chesham Examiner as "easy". In the team's final game of the calendar year, they won 7–2 away to Chesham. A. Webb made his only competitive appearance for the team and scored a hat-trick. On 19 January, half-back L. Watson made his debut in the game at home to Maidenhead, having been signed by the club after he impressed them with his performance in an inter-county match between teams representing Kent and Sussex. W. Thomas also made his debut and scored one of the goals. A week later, New Brompton defeated Sheppey 3–1 at home to maintain their record of having won every league game. The Athletic News reported that Sheppey had their goalkeeper to thank for keeping the margin of the defeat down. The writer noted that Russell, New Brompton's goalkeeper, was "almost a spectator".

New Brompton's run of victories continued with wins away to Maidenhead and Uxbridge, both without conceding a goal. The team scored two goals in the latter game, the fewest they had yet achieved in a Southern League match, and an Uxbridge newspaper reporter wrote that he had heard that the New Brompton players "admitted that it was the toughest fight they have had in the League tournament". New Brompton's only league defeat of the season came on 9 March when they lost 3–1 at home to Bromley. Athletic News columnist "Grasshopper" attributed the defeat to "the deplorable state of the ground". Dickenson was absent from the team for the only time during the season. Two weeks later the teams met again at Bromley's ground and New Brompton won 3–2 in what the East Kent Gazette described as a "keen struggle".

The team's final two games of the regular league season took place on consecutive days. On 12 April, they beat Old St Stephen's 6–0 away from home; Rule scored three of the goals, the team's third Southern League hat-trick of the season. The following day New Brompton played Chesham at home and won 9–0; Lloyd's Weekly Newspaper reported that the team "simply made rings round their opposition". Rule scored five goals to take his total for the league season to 18. New Brompton finished the season with 11 wins in 12 games; their total of 57 goals was more than twice that achieved by any other team in the division. Rule alone scored more goals than the entire team of fourth-placed Uxbridge.

=== League match details ===
Key

- In result column, New Brompton's score shown first
- H = Home match
- A = Away match
- o.g. = Own goal

Results
| Date | Opponents | Result | Goalscorers | Attendance |
|---|---|---|---|---|
| 15 September 1894 | Sheppey United (A) | 6–0 | Hutcheson (3), Manning, Rule, Button (o.g.) | 3,000 |
| 22 September 1894 | Uxbridge (H) | 4–0 | Hutcheson, Rule, Manning, Buckland | not recorded |
| 1 December 1894 | Old St Stephen's (H) | 5–2 | Manning (2), Rule (2), Jenner | 300 |
| 29 December 1894 | Chesham (A) | 7–2 | Webb (3), Hutcheson, Manning, Dickenson, Spratley (o.g.) | 300 |
| 19 January 1895 | Maidenhead (H) | 6–0 | Rule (2), Thomas, Buckland, Hutcheson, Dickenson | 2,000 |
| 26 January 1895 | Sheppey United (H) | 3–1 | Rule (2), Hutcheson | 3,000 |
| 23 February 1895 | Maidenhead (A) | 5–0 | Hutcheson (2), Buckland, Rule, Dickenson | not recorded |
| 2 March 1895 | Uxbridge (A) | 2–0 | Jenner (2) | 400 |
| 9 March 1895 | Bromley (H) | 1–3 | Hutcheson | not recorded |
| 23 March 1895 | Bromley (A) | 3–2 | Buckland (2), Rule | 2,000 |
| 12 April 1895 | Old St Stephen's (A) | 6–0 | Rule (3), Hutcheson (2), Pellatt | 2,500 |
| 13 April 1895 | Chesham (H) | 9–0 | Rule (5), Dickenson (2), Hutcheson, Gladwell | not recorded |

=== Partial league table ===
Southern League Division Two final table, top positions
| Pos | Team | Pld | W | D | L | GF | GA | GAv | Pts | |
|---|---|---|---|---|---|---|---|---|---|---|
| 1 | New Brompton | 12 | 11 | 0 | 1 | 57 | 10 | 5.700 | 22 | Qualified for "test matches" for possible promotion |
| 2 | Sheppey United | 12 | 6 | 1 | 5 | 25 | 23 | 1.087 | 13 | Qualified for "test matches" for possible promotion |
| 3 | Old St Stephen's | 12 | 6 | 0 | 6 | 26 | 26 | 1.000 | 12 | Qualified for "test matches" for possible promotion |
| 4 | Uxbridge | 12 | 4 | 3 | 5 | 14 | 20 | 0.700 | 11 | |

=== Test match ===
Although New Brompton finished top of Division Two, this did not guarantee promotion to Division One. Instead, the team were required to play a "test match" against Swindon Town, who had finished bottom of Division One, the winners of which would play in the higher division in the subsequent season. The match was played at a neutral venue in Caversham, near Reading, two weeks after the regular season's final game. Rule scored four times as New Brompton won 5–1 to gain promotion. The Southern League ultimately expanded Division One from nine teams to ten for the subsequent season, so Swindon retained their place despite losing the match.

==== Test match details ====
Key

- In result column, New Brompton's score shown first
- N = Match played at neutral venue

Results
| Date | Opponents | Result | Goalscorers | Attendance |
|---|---|---|---|---|
| 27 April 1895 | Swindon Town (N) | 5–1 | Rule (4), Buckland | 1,000 |

== FA Cup ==
Having received a bye in the first qualifying round, New Brompton entered the 1894–95 FA Cup at the second qualifying round stage and were paired with Chatham of the Southern League Division One. The match drew approximately 8,000 fans, the largest recorded attendance to date at the Athletic Ground. Dickenson scored a hat-trick in a 3–0 win for the home team; as New Brompton had been eliminated at the earliest stage in the previous season's FA Cup, this was the club's first victory in the competition. In the third qualifying round, New Brompton faced another Southern League Division One team, Millwall Athletic. Although New Brompton had beaten Millwall in a friendly earlier in the year, they lost the cup game 2–0 and were eliminated from the competition.

=== FA Cup match details ===
Key

- In result column, New Brompton's score shown first
- H = Home match

Results
| Date | Round | Opponents | Result | Goalscorers | Attendance |
|---|---|---|---|---|---|
| 3 November 1894 | 2nd qualifying | Chatham (H) | 3–0 | Dickenson (3) | 8,000 |
| 24 November 1894 | 3rd qualifying | Millwall Athletic (H) | 0–2 | | 4,000 |

== Players ==
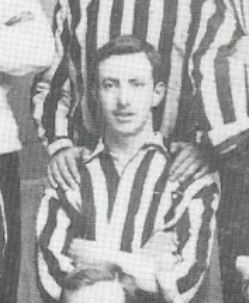
Harry Buckland played in all 15 of the team's Southern League and FA Cup matches.

During the season, 18 players made at least one competitive appearance for New Brompton. Harry Buckland and Alf Meager made the most, playing in all 15 games. Dickenson, Hutcheson, Dan Pellatt and A. Ashdown each missed one game. Webb and R. Read made the fewest appearances; each played his only match for New Brompton's first team during the season. Rule's 22 goals made him the team's top scorer; Hutcheson had the second highest total, with 13.

Player statistics
| Player | Position | Southern League | | Test match | | FA Cup | | Total | |
| Player | Position | Apps | Goals | Apps | Goals | Apps | Goals | Apps | Goals |
|---|---|---|---|---|---|---|---|---|---|
| A. Ashdown | FB | 11 | 0 | 1 | 0 | 2 | 0 | 14 | 0 |
| H. Auld | FB | 10 | 0 | 0 | 0 | 2 | 0 | 12 | 0 |
| Harry Buckland | FW | 12 | 5 | 1 | 1 | 2 | 0 | 15 | 6 |
| Joe Dickenson | FW | 11 | 5 | 1 | 0 | 2 | 3 | 14 | 8 |
| A. Gladwell | FW | 2 | 1 | 0 | 0 | 0 | 0 | 2 | 1 |
| David Hutcheson | FW | 11 | 13 | 1 | 0 | 2 | 0 | 14 | 13 |
| A. James | HB | 4 | 0 | 0 | 0 | 2 | 0 | 6 | 0 |
| Alf Jenner | GK/FW | 4 | 3 | 0 | 0 | 0 | 0 | 4 | 3 |
| D. Keefe | FB | 2 | 0 | 1 | 0 | 0 | 0 | 3 | 0 |
| Fred Manning | HB | 7 | 5 | 0 | 0 | 2 | 0 | 9 | 5 |
| Alf Meager | HB | 12 | 0 | 1 | 0 | 2 | 0 | 15 | 0 |
| Dan Pellatt | HB | 11 | 1 | 1 | 0 | 2 | 0 | 14 | 1 |
| R. Read | FW | 1 | 0 | 0 | 0 | 0 | 0 | 1 | 0 |
| Arthur Rule | FW | 9 | 18 | 1 | 4 | 2 | 0 | 12 | 22 |
| A. Russell | GK | 11 | 0 | 1 | 0 | 2 | 0 | 14 | 0 |
| W. Thomas | FW | 6 | 1 | 1 | 0 | 0 | 0 | 7 | 1 |
| L. Watson | HB | 7 | 0 | 1 | 0 | 0 | 0 | 8 | 0 |
| A. Webb | FW | 1 | 3 | 0 | 0 | 0 | 0 | 1 | 3 |

FW = Forward, HB = Half-back, GK = Goalkeeper, FB = Full-back

== Aftermath ==
Leading goalscorer Rule did not play for New Brompton again after the 1894–95 season; Dickenson also left, although he would briefly return in 1903. In their first season in Division One, the team finished 6th out of 10 clubs. The club, which changed its name to Gillingham in 1912, remained in this division until 1920, when the Southern League Division One was incorporated in its entirety into the Football League to form its new Third Division.
