= Durling =

Durling is a surname. Notable people with the surname include:

- E. V. Durling (1893–1957), American journalist
- Robert M. Durling (1929–2015), American scholar and translator
- Stewart E. Durling (1875–1936), Canadian politician

== See also ==
- Dorling, another surname
