= Jack Day =

English footballer (born 1924)

Personal information
- Full name: Jackie Norman Day
- Date of birth: 21 January 1924
- Place of birth: Northfleet, England
- Date of death: 22 September 2015 (aged 91)
- Place of death: Kent, England
- Position: Goalkeeper

Senior career*
Years	Team	Apps	(Gls)
1941–1946	Erith & Belvedere		
1946–1948	Gillingham	2	(0)
1948	Walthamstow Avenue		
1948	Shrewsbury Town		
1948–1949	Fulham	0	(0)
1949	Brighton & Hove Albion	0	(0)
1949–?	Gillingham	17	(0)
- * Club domestic league appearances and goals

Jackie Norman "Jack" Day (21 January 1924 – 22 September 2015) was an English professional footballer. He played as a goalkeeper

== Career ==
Born in Northfleet, Day played for the local youth club before joining amateur club Erith & Belvedere in 1941. After the Second World War he joined Gillingham of the Kent League, but made only two first team appearances, the second against his hometown club Gravesend & Northfleet in December 1947, after the club had moved up to the Southern League. He had a short spell with Walthamstow Avenue of the Isthmian League before joining Shrewsbury Town of the Midland League. He later had short spells with Football League clubs Fulham and Brighton & Hove Albion but failed to make it out of the reserve team. In July 1949 he rejoined Gillingham and made 16 Southern League appearances deputising for regular goalkeeper Johnny Burke in the 1949–50 season, at the end of which the Gills were elected into The Football League. Day, however, broke his arm in a reserve team match at the end of the season and this, combined with the signing of new goalkeeper Larry Gage, limited his first team chances during the 1950–51 season. He made his Football League debut against Aldershot in April 1951, but it was to be his only league appearance.
