= Lionel Dorling =

British Army officer

- Born: 7 August 1860; Epsom, England
- Died: 11 July 1925 (aged 64); Hampstead, London, England
- Military career
- Allegiance: United Kingdom
- Branch: British Army
- Rank: Colonel
- Units: King's Own Yorkshire Light Infantry; Army Pay Department
- Conflicts: Second Boer War; First World War
- Awards: Companion of the Order of the Bath; Companion of the Order of St Michael and St George; Distinguished Service Order; Mention in Despatches

Colonel Lionel Dorling CB, CMG, DSO (7 August 1860 – 11 July 1925) was a British Army officer.

== Early years ==
Dorling was born on 7 August 1860 the son of Henry and Elizabeth Dorling of Epsom. He was educated at Charterhouse School between 1873 and 1878, and commissioned as a second lieutenant in the 105th Regiment of Foot on 13 August 1879.

== Military career ==
Dorling was promoted to lieutenant in the 5th (Militia) Battalion of the Yorkshire Regiment on 15 November 1879, and transferred to the King's Own Yorkshire Light Infantry (KOYLI) when he received a commission in the regular army. He served as adjutant of the militia battalion from 30 May 1882 to 20 November 1887, when he relinquished this assignment, during which he was promoted to captain in his actual regiment on 28 May 1884.

In 1893 he was seconded from the KOYLI for service in the Army Pay Department.

== War Service ==
Dorling served in South Africa throughout the Second Boer War from 1899 to 1902. He was Field Paymaster to the Natal Field Force, which took part in the effort to Relieve Ladysmith, and he was thus present at the battles of Colenso (December 1899) and the Tugela Heights (February 1900). Promoted to major on 27 March 1900, he stayed in South Africa until after the war ended in June 1902, leaving for England on the SS Dunvegan Castle in October that year. For his service he was Mentioned in Despatches (London Gazette 29/07/1902), received the Queen’s Medal with 5 clasps and the King’s Medal with 2 clasps, and was awarded the Distinguished Service Order (DSO) in the October 1902 South Africa Honours list (the award was dated 22 August 1902).

He was promoted to lieutenant-colonel on 3 July 1906.

From 1 May 1905, he was employed with the Army Accounts Department.

- Accountant 01/05/1905
- Staff Paymaster 03/07/1901 to 1/01/1911
- Accountant Army Pay Dept. 01/05/1905 to 31/12/1909
- Chief Paymaster, Army Pay Dept. 12/01/1911
- Command Paymaster
  - London District 01/03/1911 to 20/04/1912
  - Malta 29/04/1912 to 03/08/1912
  - South Africa 30/09/1912 to 1914
  - Eastern Command 17/12/1916

== Family ==
In December 1888 Dorling married Constance Price, daughter of William Henry and Ada Price in Karachi. They had one son Lionel Henry Godfrey Dorling, born in Lichfield, Staffordshire in September 1889.

Dorling died on 11 July 1925 at Littlehampton, Sussex.

== Honours and awards ==
- 31 October 1902 - Companion of the Distinguished Service Order Major Lionel Dorling, Army Pay Department. In recognition of services during the operations in South Africa.
- 3 June 1916 - Companion of the Order of the Bath (CB) Col, Lionel Dorling, D.S.O., for services rendered in connection with military operations in the field
- 1 January 1919 - Companion of the Order of St Michael and St George (CMG) Col. Lionel Dorling, C.B., D.S.O., A.P. Dept. for services rendered in connection with the War.
