= Joe Dickenson =

English footballer

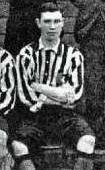

Personal information
- Full name: Joseph Dickenson
- Date of birth: 1873
- Place of birth: Chatham, England
- Date of death: Unknown
- Position: Winger

Senior career*
Years	Team	Apps	(Gls)
1892–1894	Bolton Wanderers	42	(11)
1894–1895	New Brompton	11	(5)
1895–?	Chatham		
- Grays United
1903	New Brompton	2	(0)
- * Club domestic league appearances and goals

Joseph Dickenson was an English footballer. He made his Football League debut in 1892 for Bolton Wanderers and went on to make 42 league appearances for the club, scoring 11 goals. He also appeared for the club in the 1894 FA Cup Final. In 1894 he moved to New Brompton and made 11 appearances in the club's first season in the Southern Football League. After spells playing for Chatham and Grays United he returned to New Brompton in 1903 and made a further two appearances.

== Personal life ==
Dickenson married Kate in 1894 in Kent and they had five children. By 1911 they resided in Caversham, Oxfordshire. Three occupations are listed for Joseph in census, ship's joiner, warehouseman and fruit dealer.
