= Randolph Jenkins =

Irish footballer (1925–1978)

Personal information
- Full name: Randolph Joseph Jenkins
- Date of birth: 5 September 1925
- Place of birth: Sligo, Irish Free State
- Date of death: July 1978 (aged 52)
- Place of death: Studio City, Los Angeles, USA
- Position: Forward

Senior career*
Years	Team	Apps	(Gls)
1945–1946	Walsall	0	(0)
1946–1948	Northampton Town	18	(6)
1948–1950	Fulham	0	(0)
1950–?	Gillingham	2	(0)
Total		20	(6)
- * Club domestic league appearances and goals

Randolph Joseph Jenkins (5 September 1925 – July 1978) was an Irish professional footballer. An inside forward, he made 20 appearances in the Football League for Gillingham and Northampton Town.
