= Billy Bates (footballer) =

English footballer

Personal information
- Full name: William Henry Bates
- Date of birth: 13 January 1922
- Place of birth: Eaton Bray, England
- Date of death: August 1997 (aged 75)
- Place of death: Luton, England
- Height: 5 ft 7 in (1.70 m)
- Position: Winger

Senior career*
Years	Team	Apps	(Gls)
- Eaton Bray
- Waterlows
1941–1948	Luton Town	1	(0)
1947–1948	Chelmsford City	9	(3)
1948–1949	Watford	13	(1)
1949–1950	Gillingham	6	(0)
- Dunstable Town
- * Club domestic league appearances and goals

William Henry Bates (13 January 1922 — August 1997) was an English footballer who played as a winger.

== Career ==
Bates began his career playing for local clubs Eaton Bray and Waterlows, before signing for Luton Town. Bates made one first team appearance for Luton, playing in a 2–0 defeat against Millwall on 7 October 1946. After a spell at Chelmsford City, Bates joined Watford in time for the 1948–49 Football League season, making 13 league appearances, scoring once. Following his departure from Watford, Bates played for Gillingham and Dunstable Town.
