= Joe Campbell (footballer, born 1925) =

Scottish footballer

Joseph Campbell (28 March 1925 – 7 September 1980) was a Scottish professional association football player of the 1940s and 1950s. After failing to break into the first team with Celtic, he went on to play for Leyton Orient and Gillingham and made 17 appearances in the English Football League.
