= 1893–94 New Brompton F.C. season =

English football club season

New Brompton
1893–94 season
- Chairman: H.G. Croneen
- FA Cup: First qualifying round
- FA Amateur Cup: Third round
Home colours

The 1893–94 English football season was the first in which New Brompton F.C. (since 1912 called Gillingham F.C.) competed. The club did not play in a league, but played a large number of friendlies and matches in local cup competitions as well as taking part in the qualifying rounds of the FA Cup and FA Amateur Cup.

== Friendlies ==
New Brompton's first ever match was at home to the reserves of Woolwich Arsenal on 2 September 1893, a match which the away team won 5–1.

== National cup competitions ==
=== FA Cup ===
New Brompton entered at the first qualifying round stage, but lost 6–3 away to Ilford. A.Jenner scored two goals and D.Hutcheson the third.

=== FA Amateur Cup ===
New Brompton beat Maidstone United and Royal Scots Fusiliers before losing 2–1 to Royal Ordnance.

== Regional cup competitions ==
=== Kent Senior Cup ===
New Brompton were eliminated by Dartford.

=== Chatham Charity Cup ===
New Brompton won this minor local competition, beating Sheppey United 3–1 in the final on 14 April.
