= George Piper (footballer) =

English footballer

Personal information
- Full name: Gilbert Harold Piper
- Date of birth: 21 June 1921
- Place of birth: Northfleet, England
- Date of death: July 1987 (aged 66)
- Place of death: Gravesend, England
- Position: Half-back

Senior career*
Years	Team	Apps	(Gls)
- Northfleet
1940–1946	Tottenham Hotspur	0	(0)
1946–1951	Gillingham	120	(4)
1951–?	Dartford		
- * Club domestic league appearances and goals

Gilbert Henry "George" Piper (21 June 1921 – July 1987) was an English footballer active in the years immediately after the Second World War.

A half-back, Piper began his career with Northfleet, a club which at the time acted as a nursery club for Tottenham Hotspur. He signed for Tottenham as a professional in January 1940, but with competitive football suspended due to the Second World War, he was restricted to playing in unofficial wartime competitions. Before The Football League resumed, he was released by Spurs and joined Gillingham of the Southern League. For the next four seasons he played regularly as Gillingham dominated the competition, making 116 Southern League appearances in all. In 1950, however, Gillingham were elected back into The Football League and signed Harry Ayres from Fulham to play in the half-back position. After making only four appearances during the 1950–51 season, Piper left to join Dartford.
