= Jack Frettingham =

English footballer

John Henry Abel Frettingham (1871–1904) was an English footballer. Born in Nottingham, he played 56 times in The Football League for Lincoln City between 1894 and 1896, and later had a lengthy stint with New Brompton of the Southern League, where he was the club's top scorer for five consecutive seasons.
