= Wilf Walsh =

Welsh footballer

Personal information
- Full name: Wilfred Walsh
- Date of birth: 29 July 1917
- Place of birth: Pontlottyn, Wales
- Date of death: 1977 (aged 59–60)
- Positions: Outside right; inside forward

Senior career*
Years	Team	Apps	(Gls)
1935–1939	Arsenal	3	(0)
1936–1938	→ Margate (loan)		
1938–1947	Derby County	1	(0)
1947–1948	Walsall	33	(4)

Managerial career
- Redditch United
- Hednesford Town
- * Club domestic league appearances and goals

Wilfred Walsh (29 July 1917, in Pontlottyn – 1977) was a Welsh footballer who played at outside right and inside forward.

== Career ==
He started his career at Arsenal in 1935, turning professional in 1936. However he spent two years on loan at Arsenal's nursery club Margate before returning to the Gunners and making his league debut against Preston North End on 22 October 1938, a match that Arsenal won 1–0. Walsh made a total of three first-class appearances for Arsenal, all of them in the First Division, before being transferred to Derby County in June 1939.

Walsh played for Derby during World War II and made a single League appearance in 1946–47. He moved to Walsall in March 1947 and made 33 appearances for them before his retirement from League football in 1948, making a total of 37 Football League appearances in a career interrupted by the Second World War. Walsh later managed non-league sides Redditch United and Hednesford Town.
