= Ron Lewin =

English footballer and manager

Personal information
- Full name: Denis Ronald Lewin
- Date of birth: 21 June 1920
- Place of birth: Edmonton, England
- Date of death: 24 September 1985 (aged 65)
- Place of death: Cockermouth, England
- Position: Defender

Youth career
- 1936–1939: Enfield

Senior career*
Years	Team	Apps	(Gls)
- Guested for Bradford City and Stockport County during World War II
1946–1950	Fulham	41	(0)
1950–1955	Gillingham	191	(1)
1955–?	Chatham Town		

Managerial career
- 1956–1957: Norway
- 1962–1963: Cheltenham Town
- 1963: Wellington Town
- 1968–1969: Walsall
- 1970–1972: Qadsia SC
- 1976: Knattspyrnufélag Reykjavíkur
- 1978–1979: Qadsia SC
- 1980: Knattspyrnufélagið Þróttur
- * Club domestic league appearances and goals

Denis Ronald Lewin (21 June 1920 – 24 September 1985) was an English professional footballer who played as a defender. His clubs included Fulham and Gillingham, where he made 191 Football League appearances. He would coach the Norway national football team and Cheltenham Town before coaching Everton, Newcastle United, Knattspyrnufélagið Þróttur and also in the Netherlands, Egypt and Kuwait.
