= Johnny Warsap =

English footballer

Personal information
- Full name: John William Benjamin Warsap
- Date of birth: 18 May 1921
- Place of birth: Leytonstone, England
- Date of death: 7 May 1992 (aged 70)
- Place of death: Rochester, England
- Position: Outside right

Senior career*
Years	Team	Apps	(Gls)
1945–1958	Gillingham	107	(37)
- * Club domestic league appearances and goals

John William Benjamin Warsap (18 May 1921 – 7 May 1992) was an English professional association football player, who spent his entire career with Gillingham.

== Career ==
Born in Leytonstone, Warsap served with the Royal Berkshire Regiment during the Second World War. In 1945 he played for the regimental football team in a friendly against Gillingham, and his skills as an outside right caught the eye of Gillingham manager Archie Clark, who persuaded him to sign for the club as a professional later that year. He made 9 appearances and scored 8 goals as the club won the Kent League championship in the 1945–46 season. He was a semi-regular player in the Gills' team after the club re-joined the Southern Football League in 1946, making around 20 appearances each season over the following four seasons, and helping the club win the championship on two occasions. After the club gained re-election to the Football League at the end of the 1949–50 season, he found opportunities limited and only played nine times at the higher level over the course of three seasons. He scored his only Football League goal in a 2–1 defeat to Bournemouth in April 1953. Although he did not play for the first team again after the 1953–54 season, he remained with the club until 1958, and was rewarded for his long service with a benefit match, jointly with Vic Niblett, against a British Army team in that year. After his retirement from professional football, he continued to play in local amateur leagues well into his fifties, while working in the gas industry. He died in Rochester in 1992, shortly before his 71st birthday.

== Personal life ==
He had a son named Barry, who also played amateur football to a high standard in Kent.
