= George Poulton =

English footballer

George Henry Poulton (23 April 1929 – 3 December 2010) was an English professional footballer of the 1950s. He played for Gillingham and Leyton Orient and in total made 66 appearances in The Football League, scoring 25 goals.
