= Dave Thomas (footballer, born 1917) =

English footballer and manager

Personal information
- Full name: David Watkin John Thomas
- Date of birth: 6 July 1917
- Place of birth: Stepney, England
- Date of death: 30 March 1991 (aged 73)
- Place of death: Dovercourt, England
- Position: Centre forward

Senior career*
Years	Team	Apps	(Gls)
–1938	Romford		
1938–1948	Plymouth Argyle	74	(29)
1948–1950	Watford	105	(41)
1950–1953	Gillingham	80	(42)
1953	Sittingbourne		

Managerial career
- –1955: Chatham Town
- * Club domestic league appearances and goals

David Watkin John Thomas (6 July 1917 – 30 March 1991) was an English footballer who played as a centre forward. He played in the Football League for Plymouth Argyle, Watford and Gillingham, scoring 112 goals in 259 appearances. He also played non-league football for Romford and Sittingbourne. His brother, Bob, played in the Football League for several clubs as an inside forward.

== Life and career ==
Born in Stepney, Thomas began his career in non-league football with Romford. He joined Football League club Plymouth Argyle in 1938, as manager Jack Tresadern's first signing, and established himself as the club's first choice centre forward after Bill Hullett was transferred to Manchester United. He made 23 appearances in the Second Division before the Second World War put an end to competitive football in September 1939. He continued to play for Argyle in the South West Regional League until December, scoring five goals in six matches, before guesting for Brentford, Clapton Orient, Fulham, Gillingham, Grimsby Town and West Ham United during the course of the war. Thomas returned to Plymouth Argyle after the war had finished to take part in the 1945–46 Football League South. Towards the end of the campaign, his brother Bob joined the club from Brentford and the pair scored 36 goals between them in the 1946–47 season.

Thomas lost his place in the team to Maurice Tadman at the beginning of the 1947–48 campaign. He made his final appearance for Argyle in January 1948 before being transferred to Third Division South club Watford. Thomas spent three seasons with Watford and was the club's leading goalscorer twice. He scored 41 league goals in 105 appearances before joining Gillingham in 1950, where he continued to score regularly. He was Gillingham's leading goalscorer in his first season with the club and was tied with Derek Lewis in the 1951–52 campaign. He left the club in 1953 and finished his career back in non-league football with Sittingbourne. He later managed Chatham Town and acted as trainer for Gravesend & Northfleet. Thomas died in Dovercourt on 30 March 1991 at the age of 73.
