= Arthur Rule =

British footballer

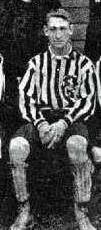
- Rule during his time with New Brompton

Personal information
- Full name: Arthur George Rule
- Date of birth: 10 December 1873
- Height: 5 ft 9 in (1.75 m)
- Position: Forward

Senior career*
Years	Team	Apps	(Gls)
- Sheppey United
1894–1895	New Brompton	9	(18)
- Sheppey United
1899–1901	Tottenham Hotspur	7	(2)
1902–1905	Portsmouth		
1905	Ryde		
1905	Brighton & Hove Albion		
- * Club domestic league appearances and goals

Arthur George Rule was a centre forward footballer who played for Sheppey United, New Brompton, Tottenham Hotspur, Portsmouth.

== Career ==
Rule began his footballing career with Sheppey United. He also worked as an Admiralty clerk in Whitehall, London. In 1894, he joined New Brompton and in his sole season with the team scored 22 goals in 12 matches as the team won the Southern League Division Two championship, including tallies of three, five and four in the final three matches of the season.

Rule was top scorer for Sheppey two consecutive seasons and had interest from Woolwich Arsenal and Millwall but chose to join Tottenham Hotspur. His debut for Spurs occurred on 11 March 1899 away to Woolwich Arsenal in the United League, which Tottenham lost 2–1. Rule's footballing career was restricted due to his commitment to the Admiralty but he did play for Portsmouth, Ryde and Brighton & Hove Albion.

== Playing statistics ==
Appearances and goals by club, season and competition
Club	Season	League			FA Cup		Other		Total	
Club	Season	Division	Apps	Goals	Apps	Goals	Apps	Goals	Apps	Goals
New Brompton	Southern League Division Two	1894–95	9	18	2	0	1	4	12	22
