= Joe Millbank =

English footballer

Personal information
- Full name: Joseph Henry Millbank
- Date of birth: 30 September 1919 (age 107)
- Place of birth: Edmonton, England
- Height: 6 ft 1 in (1.85 m)
- Position: Full back

Youth career
- Wolverhampton

Senior career*
Years	Team	Apps	(Gls)
1939	Tranmere Rovers		
1939–1948	Crystal Palace	41	(1)
1948-49	Queens Park Rangers	4	(1)
1949-50	Gillingham	3	(0)
- * Club domestic league appearances and goals

Joseph Henry Millbank (30 September 1919 – February 2002) was an English footballer active in the 1930s and 1940s. He made a total of 48 appearances in the Football League for Queens Park Rangers, Crystal Palace and Gillingham.
