= Len Henson =

English footballer

Leonard Henson (6 August 1921 – 8 May 2008) was an English professional footballer.

Born in Kingston upon Hull, he joined Gillingham at the conclusion of the Second World War, and was a regular in the team which won the Kent League in the 1945–46 season. After the club moved up to the Southern League in 1946 his first team chances were limited, but he did manage 12 appearances in the 1948–49 season when the team won the Southern League championship. He remained on the books at Priestfield Stadium even after Gillingham gained election to The Football League in 1950, but played only eight League matches in three seasons before moving to non-league Whitstable Town as player-manager. He eventually gave up playing in 1956. In 1967, he was appointed manager of another Kent-based non-league club, Maidstone United, but his spell in charge was short.
