= Johnny Burke (footballer) =

Irish footballer (1911–1987)

John Joseph Burke (28 June 1911 – November 1987) was an Irish professional footballer. A goalkeeper, he played for Chester and Millwall before the Second World War, making over 100 appearances in the Football League. He also appeared as a guest player for West Ham United during the war. In 1947 he joined Gillingham, at the time playing in the Southern League, and helped the club win the championship in 1948. In 1950 the club gained election to the Football League and signed new goalkeeper Larry Gage, but kept Burke on the books. Despite being nearly 40 years old he played five times in the 1950–51 season before retiring. He stood 5 ft 11 in (1.80 m) tall.
