= Jackie Carr (Scottish footballer) =

Scottish footballer (1924–1990)

Personal information
- Full name: John Carr
- Date of birth: 12 January 1924
- Place of birth: Bishopbriggs, Scotland
- Date of death: 18 December 1990 (aged 66)
- Place of death: Glasgow, Scotland
- Position: Winger

Senior career*
Years	Team	Apps	(Gls)
- Kirkintilloch Rob Roy
- St Roch's
- Clyde
1946–1947	Alloa Athletic		
1948–1951	Gillingham	73	(26)
1951–1952	Chelmsford City	17	(1)
- * Club domestic league appearances and goals

John Carr (12 January 1924 – 18 December 1990) was a Scottish footballer who played as a winger.

== Career ==
Prior to playing senior football, Carr played at junior level at Kirkintilloch Rob Roy and St Roch's.

Carr played senior football for Clyde (during World War II) and Alloa Athletic in Scotland, before signing for Gillingham in June 1948. On 1 September 1948, Carr made his debut for Gillingham in a 5–0 away win against Dartford. Carr scored 12 goals in each of his Southern League seasons with Gillingham, remaining with the club as they won re-election to the Football League in 1950. In his final season at the club, Carr scored two goals in 11 Football League appearances, before signing for Chelmsford City in August 1951.
