= Tommy Kingsnorth =

English footballer (1917–1992)

Thomas Henry Kingsnorth (16 April 1917 – 2 February 1992) was an English footballer. He played professionally for Gillingham between 1946 and 1951, and in total made 28 appearances in the Football League.
