= Ernie Morgan =

English footballer (1927–2013)

Personal information
- Full name: Ernest Morgan
- Date of birth: 13 January 1927
- Place of birth: Royston, England
- Date of death: 3 October 2013 (aged 86)
- Place of death: Rainham, Kent, England
- Position: Striker

Youth career
- 1943–?: Royston Youth Club

Senior career*
Years	Team	Apps	(Gls)
?–1949	Royston Colliery		
1949–1953	Lincoln City	3	(0)
1953–1957	Gillingham	155	(73)

Managerial career
- 1962–1966: Chatham Town
- 1966–1972: Dartford
- 1972–1973: Maidstone United
- 1973–1975: Dartford
- 1978–1980: Tonbridge
- 1982–1983: Dartford
- * Club domestic league appearances and goals

Ernest Morgan (13 January 1927 – 3 October 2013) was an English professional football player and manager. He spent the bulk of his career with Gillingham, where he set a record for the highest number of goals scored in a single season which still stands.

== Playing career ==
Born in Royston, Morgan worked as a miner from the age of 14 and played for his colliery football team, leading them to a Sheffield Senior Cup win shortly after World War II, the first time a works team had won the cup.

Morgan initially turned down the chance to turn professional, despite being offered a contract by Barnsley, but eventually signed for Lincoln City, albeit on a part-time basis. He only managed three Football League appearances for the "Red Imps" and was allowed to move on to Gillingham in 1953 for a fee of £3,000.

Finally turning fully professional with the Kent club, he scored 21 goals in his debut season and then topped this by scoring 31 in 1954–55, a new club record. This record was equalled by Brian Yeo during the 1970s but Morgan remains the joint holder of the record to this day.

He was selected to play for the Third Division South team against the North in 1955–56.

Morgan's playing career came to an end due to injury in 1957.

== Managerial career ==
In 1962 Morgan was appointed manager of Chatham Town, having previously served as coach. He went on to manage a number of other Kent non-league clubs, with his greatest success coming at Dartford, whom he led to the Southern League championship and an appearance in the FA Trophy final at Wembley Stadium.

Morgan died, aged 86, in Rainham, Kent on 3 October 2013.
