= Harry Ayres (footballer) =

English footballer

Personal information
- Full name: Harold Ayres
- Date of birth: 10 March 1920
- Place of birth: Redcar, England
- Date of death: 5 March 2002 (aged 81)
- Place of death: Grays, Essex

Senior career*
Years	Team	Apps	(Gls)
- Fulham
- Gillingham
- * Club domestic league appearances and goals

Harold Ayres (10 March 1920 – 5 March 2002) was an English professional footballer. His clubs included Fulham, and Gillingham, for whom he made over 130 Football League appearances.
