= Harry Briggs (footballer, born 1923) =

English footballer

Personal information
- Full name: George Harry Briggs
- Date of birth: 27 February 1923
- Place of birth: Easington, County Durham, England
- Date of death: 2005 (aged 81–82)
- Place of death: Peterlee, County Durham, England
- Position: Centre half

Senior career*
Years	Team	Apps	(Gls)
–1947	Shotton Colliery Welfare		
1947–1955	Crystal Palace	146	(4)
- * Club domestic league appearances and goals

George H. "Harry" Briggs (27 February 1923 – 2005) was a professional footballer who played as a centre half. He was born in Easington. He began his career in local football with Shotton Colliery's team and in November 1947 signed for Crystal Palace. He made 146 appearances (four goals) between then and 1955 when he retired as a player. Briggs died in 2005 aged 81 or 82.
