= Brian Yeo =

English footballer and manager

Personal information
- Full name: Brian George Yeo
- Date of birth: 12 April 1944 (age 82)
- Place of birth: Worthing, England
- Position: Striker

Youth career
- 1959–1961: Portsmouth

Senior career*
| Years | Team | Apps | (Gls) |
| 1961–1963 | Portsmouth | 0 | (0) |
| 1963–1975 | Gillingham | 356 | (136) |

Managerial career
- 1975–1978: Folkestone
- 1979–1984: Canterbury City
- * Club domestic league appearances and goals

Brian George Yeo (12 April 1944) is an English former football striker. He spent almost his entire career playing for Gillingham, for whom he holds the all-time record for the most goals scored in the Football League.

== Career ==
Yeo came through the junior ranks at Portsmouth but never made a Football League appearance before Freddie Cox signed him for Gillingham in 1963. He scored on his debut for the club and went on to become only the second player ever to score 100 Football League goals for the Kent club, finishing his career with 136 league goals and 149 in all competitions, both club records which stand to this day. He was the recipient of the club's first ever Player of the Year award in 1969. In the 1973–74 season, he also equalled Ernie Morgan's club record of 31 goals in a season. Yeo was named in the 1973–74 Football League Fourth Division PFA Team of the Year.

In 1975, Yeo retired from professional football to concentrate on running a newsagent's in the town, but also had spells managing Folkestone and Canterbury City, the latter role, his last involvement in football, finishing in 1984.
