= Billy Hales =

English footballer

William Henry Hales (6 January 1920 – 1 October 1984) was an English footballer active in the 1950s. He made 15 appearances in The Football League for Gillingham.
