= Derek Lewis (footballer) =

English footballer

Personal information
- Full name: Derek Ivor Edwin Lewis
- Date of birth: 10 June 1929
- Place of birth: Edmonton, London, England
- Date of death: 13 July 1953 (aged 24)
- Place of death: St Albans, England
- Position: Striker

Senior career*
Years	Team	Apps	(Gls)
- Erith & Belvedere
	Fulham	0	(0)
- Bury Town
1950–1952	Gillingham	48	(31)
1952–1953	Preston North End	37	(14)
- * Club domestic league appearances and goals as of 16:11, 10 December 2007 (UTC)

Derek Ivor Edwin Lewis (10 June 1929 – 13 July 1953) was an English professional football player for Gillingham and Preston North End. He made 85 Football League appearances and was tipped as a future England international but died suddenly of a brain haemorrhage at the age of 24.
