= Charlie Burtenshaw =

English footballer

Personal information
- Full name: Charles Edward Burtenshaw
- Date of birth: 16 October 1922
- Place of birth: Portslade, England
- Date of death: 22 May 2013 (aged 90)
- Place of death: Medway, England
- Position: Right winger

Senior career*
Years	Team	Apps	(Gls)
–1948	Southwick		
1948–1949	Luton Town	11	(1)
1949–1953	Gillingham	28	(4)
1953–	Snowdown Colliery Welfare		
- Canterbury City
Total		39+	(5+)
- * Club domestic league appearances and goals

Charles Edward Burtenshaw (16 October 1922 – 22 May 2013) was an English professional footballer. He played professionally for Luton Town and Gillingham between 1948 and 1953, and made 39 appearances in the Football League, scoring 5 goals.

== Personal life ==
He was the brother of fellow professional footballer Bill Burtenshaw, whom he played alongside at both Luton Town and Gillingham.
