= Larry Gage =

English footballer (1922–1996)

Personal information
- Full name: Laurence Albert Gage
- Date of birth: 10 September 1922
- Place of birth: Walthamstow, England
- Date of death: May 1996 (aged 73)
- Place of death: Norwich, England
- Height: 6 ft 0 in (1.83 m)
- Position: Goalkeeper

Senior career*
Years	Team	Apps	(Gls)
–1939	Walthamstow Avenue		
1939–1946	Fulham	0	(0)
1946	→ Hereford United guest)	0	(0)
1946–1947	Aldershot	3	(0)
1948	Toronto Ulster United		
1948–1950	Fulham	3	(0)
1950–1951	Gillingham	40	(0)
1951–1953	Bedford Town		
- * Club domestic league appearances and goals

Laurence Albert Gage (10 September 1922 – May 1996) was an English professional footballer who played in the Football League for Gillingham, Fulham and Aldershot as a goalkeeper. He also played in Canada for Toronto Ulster United.

== Personal life ==
Gage served for six years as a paratrooper with the Royal Air Force during the Second World War. After he retired from football, he became a publican in Colchester.

== Career statistics ==
Appearances and goals by club, season and competition
Club	Season	League			National Cup		Other		Total	
Club	Season	Division	Apps	Goals	Apps	Goals	Apps	Goals	Apps	Goals
Hereford United (guest)	1945–46	Southern League	0	0	―		1 (Note: Appearance in Southern League Cup)	0	1	0
Fulham	1948–49	Second Division	3	0	0	0	―		3	0
Gillingham	1950–51	Third Division South	40	0	4	0	―		44	0
Career total			43	0	4	0	1	0	48	0
