= George Dorling =

English footballer

Personal information
- Full name: George John Dorling
- Date of birth: 27 July 1918
- Place of birth: Edmonton, England
- Date of death: October 1987 (aged 69)
- Place of death: Enfield, England
- Position: Full back

Youth career
- Tottenham Hotspur

Senior career*
Years	Team	Apps	(Gls)
- Northfleet United
1937–1947	Tottenham Hotspur		
1947–1951	Gillingham	116	(3)
1951–?	Snowdown Colliery Welfare		
- * Club domestic league appearances and goals

George John Dorling (27 July 1918 – October 1987) was an English professional footballer who played as a full back.

== Career ==
Born in Edmonton, London, Wilson played professionally for Tottenham Hotspur and Gillingham. He made over 100 appearances for the "Gills".
