= Charlie Marks =

English footballer

Personal information
- Full name: Charles William Alfred Marks
- Date of birth: 21 December 1919
- Place of birth: Eccles, Kent, England
- Date of death: 19 January 2005 (aged 85)
- Position: Right back

Senior career*
Years	Team	Apps	(Gls)
- Maidstone United
- Lloyds
- Tooting & Mitcham United
1943–1958	Gillingham	392	(8)
- Tonbridge
- * Club domestic league appearances and goals

Charles William Alfred Marks (21 December 1919 – 19 January 2005) was an English professional footballer. He played for Gillingham for fifteen years, making him one of the longest-serving players in the Kent club's history. He was born in Eccles, near Aylesford, Kent.

== Career ==
As well as playing for various youth and works teams, Marks had spells with Maidstone United and Tooting & Mitcham United before joining Gillingham in 1943. He played 187 matches for the team during their spell in non-league football and, after the team's return to the Football League in 1950, made 265 further league appearances. In 1958, aged nearly 40, he left to join non-league Tonbridge, his final club.

Marks was famous for his fierce shot and once broke the net with a penalty kick. After leaving football Marks worked as a stock controller in a paper mill. In later life, he lived in Larkfield, near Maidstone. He died in January 2005 and was survived by his wife Gladys.
