= Jackie Briggs =

English footballer (1924–1992)

John Briggs (27 October 1924 – October 1992) was an English professional footballer who played as a left winger for Gillingham between 1946 and 1953.
