= Bill Burtenshaw =

English footballer

Personal information
- Full name: William Frederick Burtenshaw
- Date of birth: 13 December 1925
- Place of birth: Portslade, England
- Date of death: 23 February 2010 (aged 84)

Senior career*
Years	Team	Apps	(Gls)
- Southwick
- Luton Town
- Gillingham
- Snowdown Colliery
- * Club domestic league appearances and goals

William Frederick Burtenshaw (13 December 1925 – 23 February 2010) was an English professional footballer.

Born in Portslade, he played amateur football in Sussex, including for Southwick, and then went on to play professionally for Luton Town and Gillingham between 1948 and 1952, and in total made 40 appearances in the Football League, scoring eight goals. He played alongside his brother, Charlie Burtenshaw, at both Luton and Gillingham, and they played together for Kentish non-league clubs Snowdown Colliery and Canterbury City.

Burtenshaw died on 23 February 2010.
