= George Forrester (footballer, born 1927) =

English footballer

Personal information
- Full name: George Larmouth Forrester
- Date of birth: 8 June 1927
- Place of birth: Hednesford, England
- Date of death: 25 September 1981 (aged 54)
- Place of death: Reading, England
- Position: Wing half

Senior career*
Years	Team	Apps	(Gls)
1946–1947	West Bromwich Albion	0	(0)
1947–55	Gillingham	100	(3)
1955–1956	Reading	6	(2)
1956–1957	Headington United		
1957–1958	Ashford Town	28	(6)
- * Club domestic league appearances and goals

George Larmouth Forrester (8 June 1927 – 25 September 1981) was an English professional footballer. His clubs included Reading and Gillingham, where he made 100 Football League appearances.
