= Hughie Russell =

English footballer

Personal information
- Full name: William Hugh Russell
- Date of birth: 10 March 1921
- Place of birth: Redcar, England
- Date of death: 10 December 1991 (aged 70)
- Place of death: Taunton, England
- Position: Centre forward

Senior career*
Years	Team	Apps	(Gls)
- South Bank
- Bishop Auckland
- Royal Engineers (Barton Stacey)
1946–1952	Gillingham	187	(106)
- * Club domestic league appearances and goals

William Hugh "Hughie" Russell (10 March 1921 – 10 December 1991) was an English professional footballer.

Shortly after World War II Russell joined Gillingham, then a non-league team. He scored 98 goals in just 126 games for the Kent side prior to their return to the Football League in 1950, including a haul of nine goals in a match against Gloucester City in the 1946–47 season, a club record for a single match which stands to this day. Contemporary newspaper reports state that he hit the post late on with a shot which could have given him double figures.

Russell remained at the club after its re-election to the Football League, but could not repeat his non-league scoring feats, registering just 8 goals in over 60 matches. He was forced to retire through injury in 1952 and later served as the club's trainer before leaving football entirely to work as a hotelier. He died in Taunton in 1991.
