= Archie Clark (footballer) =

English footballer and manager

Personal information
- Full name: Archibald William Clark
- Date of birth: 2 April 1902
- Place of birth: Shoreham, Kent
- Date of death: 31 January 1967 (aged 64)
- Height: 5 ft 10 in (1.78 m)
- Position: Midfielder

Senior career*
Years	Team	Apps	(Gls)
- Grays Thurrock
1927	Brentford	1	
1927–1928	Arsenal	2	
1928–1931	Luton Town		
1931–1936	Everton		
1936–1939	Tranmere Rovers		

Managerial career
- 1939–1958: Gillingham
- 1958–1959: Sheffield United
- * Club domestic league appearances and goals

Archibald William Clark (4 April 1902 – January 1967) was an English football player and manager.

== Playing career ==
Born in Shoreham, Kent, Clark started out at Grays Thurrock before turning professional and joining Brentford in March 1927. He only played one League game for the Bees, before moving to Arsenal in May the same year. Mainly used as a wing half at Arsenal, he was mostly a reserve, only playing one first-team game, in a 4–1 defeat to Blackburn Rovers at Ewood Park on 5 November 1927.

He moved to Luton Town in November 1928 and spent three seasons there before joining Everton in 1931. He was a near ever-present as they won the 1931–32 First Division title. However, he was forced out of the side by Cliff Britton and Joe Mercer and between 1932 and 1936 only played two League games. In 1936 he moved to Tranmere Rovers and won the 1937–38 Third Division North title.

== Managerial career ==
He managed Gillingham for nineteen years, from 1939 to 1958. He also had a brief spell as acting manager of Sheffield United. He finished his career as a scout at Sheffield United. He died aged 64 in January 1967.
