= List of Gillingham F.C. players (25–49 appearances) =

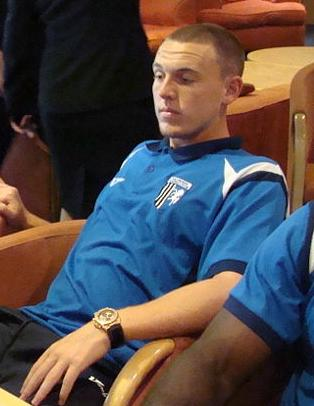
Defender Sean Clohessy played 46 times for Gillingham.

Gillingham Football Club is an English professional association football club based in Gillingham, Kent, playing in EFL League Two, the fourth level of the English football league system, as of the 2025–26 season. The club was formed in 1893 as New Brompton F.C., a name which was retained until 1912, and has played home matches at Priestfield Stadium throughout its history. The club joined The Football League (now called the English Football League) in 1920, was voted out of the league in favour of Ipswich Town at the end of the 1937–38 season, but returned to the league 12 years later after it was expanded from 88 to 92 clubs. Between 2000 and 2005, Gillingham played in the second tier of the English football league system for the only time in the club's history, achieving a highest league finish of eleventh place in 2002–03. The club's first team have competed in numerous nationally and regionally organised competitions, and all players who have played between 25 and 49 such matches, either as a member of the starting eleven or as a substitute, are listed below.

Each player's details include the duration of his Gillingham career, his typical playing position while with the club, and the number of games played and goals scored in all senior competitive matches. Several players have contributed significantly to the history of the club, despite only playing between 24 and 49 games. (Note: For the majority of the club's existence, Gillingham's first team have competed in leagues in which each team plays 46 games each season, thus players on this list have at most played approximately the equivalent of one full season for the team.) Deon Burton only spent one season at the club, but scored 13 goals, the second highest of any player that season, to help the club win the championship of Football League Two in the 2012–13 season. Dave Martin captained the Gills to promotion from the Football League Third Division in the 1995–96 season. Charlie McGibbon scored a hat-trick when New Brompton knocked Sunderland of the Football League First Division out of the FA Cup in the 1907–08 season, the club's first "giant-killing". Darius Henderson, Charlie Satterthwaite and Dick Edmed went on to play at the highest level of football in England following their time at Gillingham.

== Key ==
- The list is ordered first by number of appearances, and then date of debut.
- Appearances as a substitute are included. This feature of the game was introduced in the Football League at the start of the 1965–66 season.
- Statistics are correct up to the end of the 2025–26 season.

Positions key
Pre-1960s		1960s–	
GK	Goalkeeper		
FB	Full back	DF	Defender
HB	Half back	MF	Midfielder
FW	Forward		

Nationality
Unless otherwise noted, the nationality of a player is determined by the country/countries for which he has played international football, or if the player has not played international football, his country of birth.
Position
Playing positions are listed according to the tactical formations that were employed at the time. Thus the change in the names of defensive and midfield positions reflects the tactical evolution that occurred from the 1960s onwards.
Club career
Club career is defined as the first and last calendar years in which the player appeared for the club in any of the competitions listed below.
Total appearances and Total goals
Total appearances and goals comprise all first team games in the English Football League, FA Cup, Football League Cup, Football League Trophy, Football League Third Division South Cup, Southern League, Southern League Cup, Kent League and Kent League Cup. Matches in wartime competitions are excluded, as are supplementary matches played in the Kent League and Thames & Medway Combination between 1895 and 1903, when the club's primary competition was the Southern League.

== Players ==
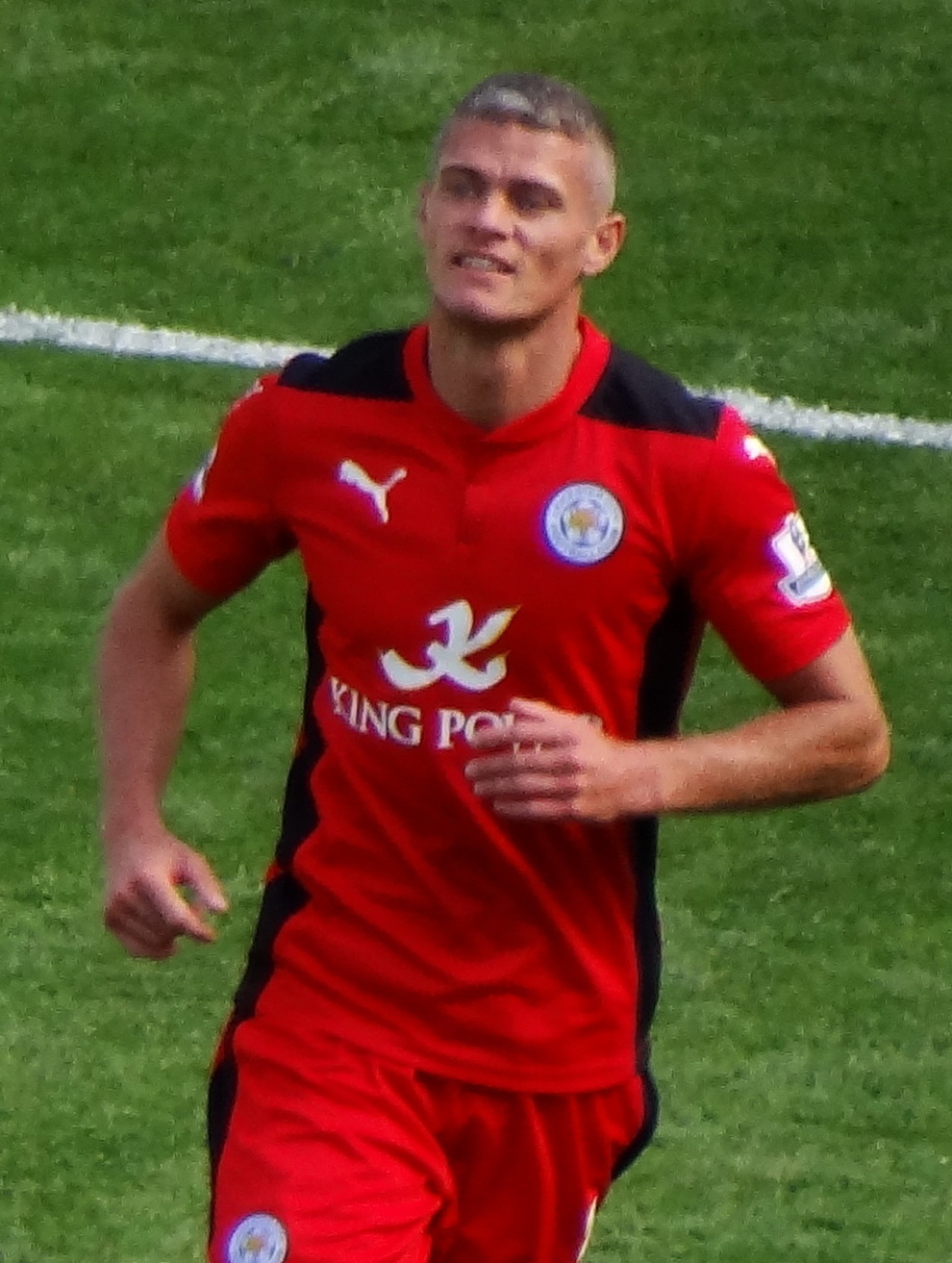
Former England international Paul Konchesky played for Gillingham late in his career.

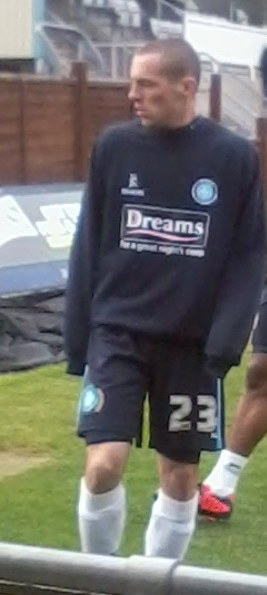
Michael Harriman spent the 2013–14 season on loan to Gillingham from Queens Park Rangers.

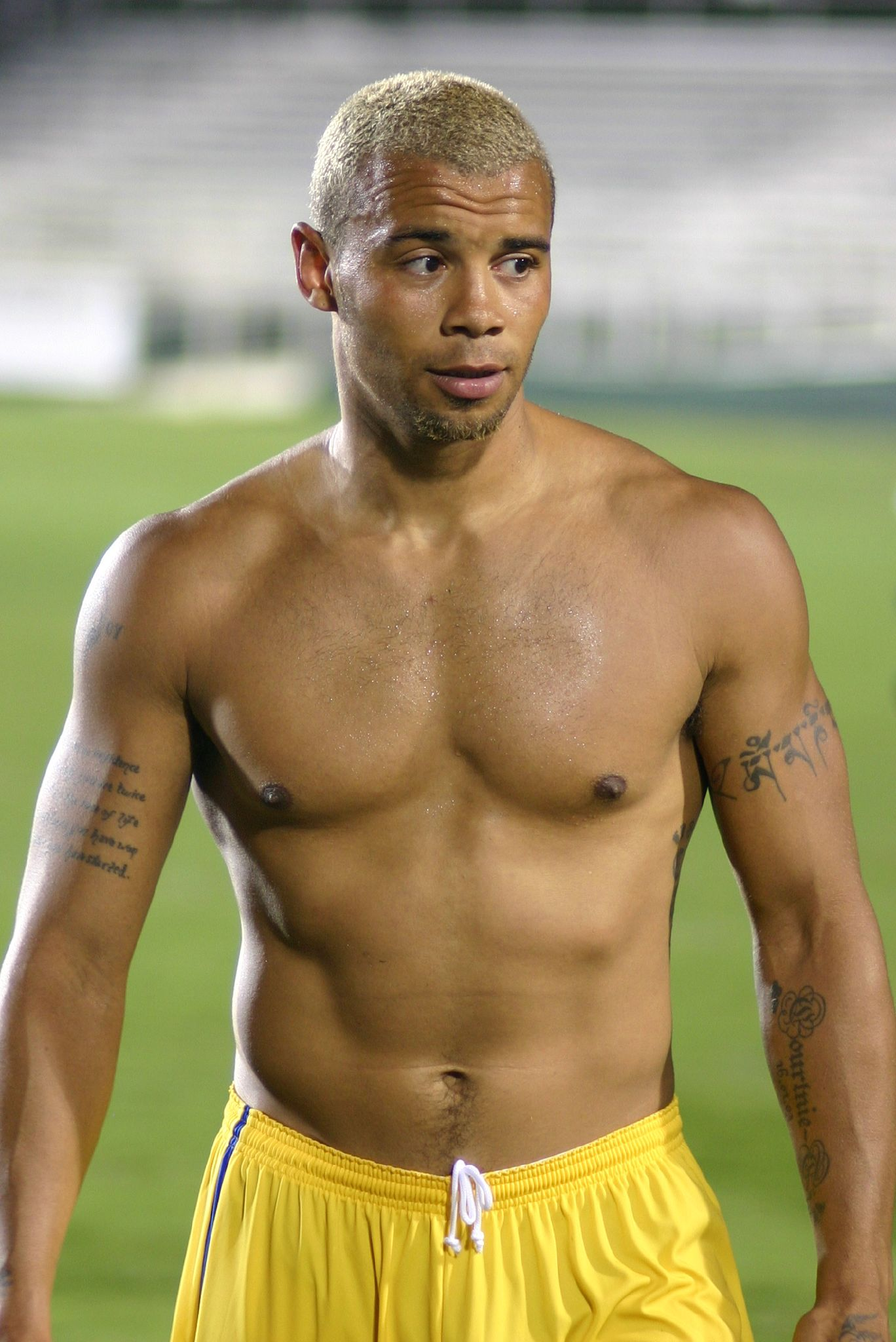
Deon Burton spent the 2012–13 season with the Gills and helped the team win the League Two championship.

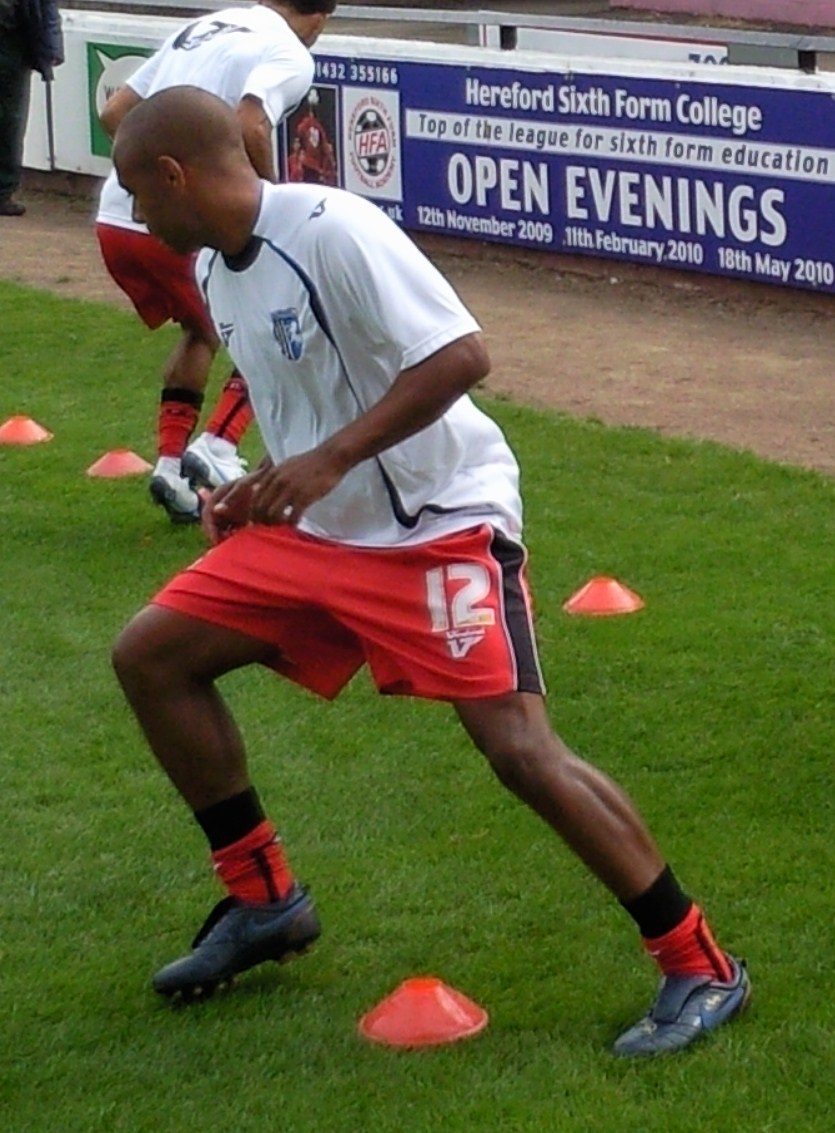
Chris Palmer played for the club from 2009 until 2011.

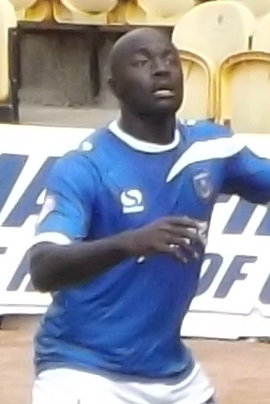
Patrick Agyemang scored 8 goals in 34 games for the Gills.

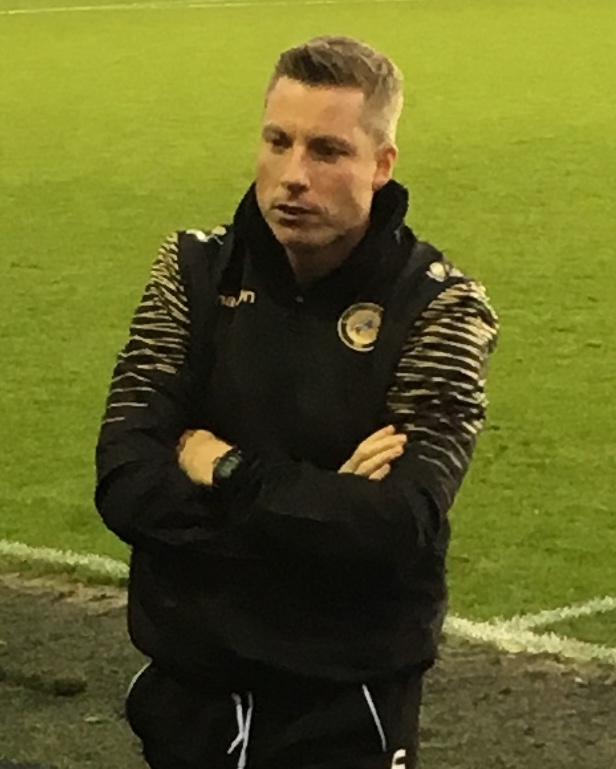
Neil Harris made 39 appearances for Gillingham and returned as manager in 2022.

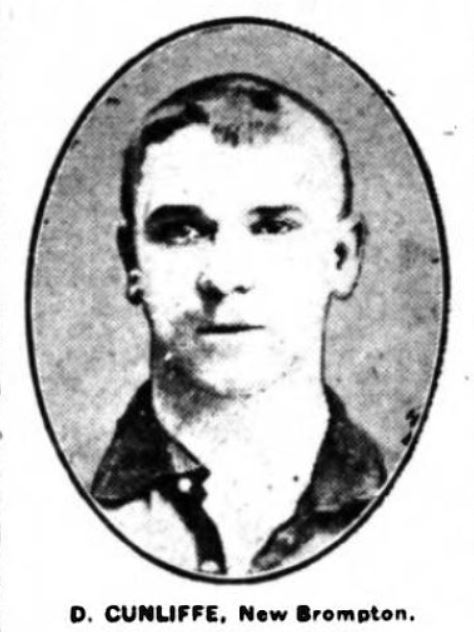
Dan Cunliffe scored 15 goals in his only season with the club.

Percy Barnfather played for New Brompton in the Southern League in the early twentieth century.

List of Gillingham F.C. players with between 25 and 49 appearances
Name	Nationality	Position	Gillingham career	Apps.	Goals	Notes
Simon Osborn	England	MF	2001–2003	49	5	
Adrian Foster	England	FW	1994–1996	49	11	
Bobby Folds	England	DF	1968–1971	49	2	
George Ballsom	Wales	FB	1935–1938	49	0	
Bill Pickering	England	FB	1926–1927	49	0	
Scott Malone	England	DF	2023–2024	48	4	
Ben Reeves	England	MF	2021–2023	48	2	
Charlie Livesey	England	FW	1961–1963	48	17	
James McKee	Scotland	FW	1904–1906	48	8	
E.S. King	England	FB	1897–1899	48	0	
Chris Palmer	England	DF	2009–2011	47	6	
David Stocks	England	DF	1965–1966	47	0	
Johnny Edgar	England	FW	1958–1959	47	24	
Paul Lucas	England	FW	1956–1958	47	7	
William Jones	England	HB	1929–1932	47	2	
George Chance	England	FW	1924–1925	47	4	
Hugh Goldie	Scotland	HB	1902–1904	47	3	
Will Wright	England	DF	2022–2023	46	2	
Sean Clohessy	England	DF	2005–2009	46	1	
Derek Hales	England	FW	1984–1986	46	11	
Jack Rutherford	England	GK	1927–1931	46	0	
A.P. Gladwell	unknown	FW	1894–1901	46	12	
Allan Gauden	England	FW	1974–1976	45	3	
Peter Shearing	England	GK	1971–1973	45	0	
John Ballagher	England	FW	1962–1964	45	12	
Jimmy Reid	Scotland	FW	1908–1910	45	17	
Larry Gage	England	GK	1950–1951	44	0	
Harry Rowley	England	FW	1938–1939	44	41	
George Tadman	England	FW	1935–1936	44	19	
Jimmy Poxton	England	FW	1928–1929	44	9	
Callum Reilly	Republic of Ireland	MF	2018, 2018–2019	43	5	
Deon Burton	Jamaica	FW	2012–2013	43	13	
Peter Feely	England	FW	1974–1976	43	22	
Derek Bellotti	England	GK	1966–1970	43	0	
Peter Smith	England	HB	1958–1960	43	2	
Len Henson	England	HB	1946–1951	43	0	
George Crawford	England	FB	1927–1929	43	1	
Joe North	England	FW	1923–1924	43	17	
Percy Barnfather	England	FW	1904–1906	43	4	
Albert Dunkley	England	FW	1901–1903	43	8	
Tommy Leigh	England	FW	1901–1903	43	19	
Aaron Rowe	England	MF	2024–2026	48	2	
Connor Mahoney	England	FW	2023–2024	42	7	
Charlie Allen	England	MF	2012–2014	42	2	
Bill Albury	England	HB	1959–1960	42	15	
Tom Nekrews	England	FB	1953–1958	42	0	
Billy Hales	England	FW	1950–1952	42	16	
Owen Marshall	England	FB	1921–1923	42	0	
Syd Gore	England	FW	1918–1921, 1929–1930	42	0	
Alf Whyman	England	FW	1908–1909	42	8	
Terry Simpson	England	MF	1968–1969	41	4	
T. Holmes	unknown	GK	1910–1911	41	0	
P. Boyle	Scotland	FB	1908–1909	41	0	
P. Travers	unknown	FW	1904–1906	41	3	
Walter Leigh	England	FW	1903–1905	41	16	
Irvin Gernon	England	DF	1986–1988	40	1	
Neil Grewcock	England	FW	1981–1983	40	4	
Bob Wilson	Scotland	HB	1960–1961	40	0	
Brian Payne	England	FW	1957–1960	40	5	
W. Johnson	England	FW	1938–1939	40	14	
George Tweed	England	FB	1937–1939	40	0	
Tommy Millington	Wales	FW	1928–1929	40	2	
Reg McKee	England	FW	1925–1927	40	15	
Dan Cunliffe	England	FW	1906–1907	40	15	
Rod Wallace	England	FW	2002–2004	40	12	
Callum Davies	England	DF	2010–2015	39	0	
Neil Harris	England	FW	2005–2006	39	6	
Les Berry	England	DF	1986–1988	39	0	
Robert Costello	Scotland	FB	1938–1939	39	0	
Tommy Robinson	England	FW	1936–1937	39	13	
George Scott	England	FW	1930–1932	39	7	
Jim Thomson	Scotland	GK	1921–1923	39	0	
Tom Boucher	England	FW	1903–1905	39	7	
Darius Henderson	England	FW	2003–2005	39	10	
Jason Lillis	England	FW	1987–1989	38	7	
Tony Funnell	England	FW	1978–1980	38	10	
Dave Coxhill	Scotland	MF	1973–1975	38	1	
Mike Bickle	England	FW	1971–1973	38	7	
Peter Stringfellow	England	FW	1962–1964	38	4	
Wendell Morgan	Wales	FW	1957–1958	38	4	
Joe Hutton	Scotland	FW	1957–1958	38	7	
H. Chapman	unknown	HB	1945–1948	38	0	
Patrick Bradley	Scotland	FW	1926–1928	38	3	
Bill Palmer	England	FW	1922–1923	38	5	
Michael Harriman	Republic of Ireland	DF	2013–2014	37	1	
Stefan Payne	England	FW	2010–2012	37	2	
Dominic Naylor	England	DF	1995–1996	37	2	
Dave Martin	England	DF	1995–1996	37	2	
Mel Eves	England	FW	1986–1988	37	9	
Rodney Green	England	FW	1964–1965	37	17	
Ken Lambert	England	FW	1952–1953	37	10	
Bobby Veck	England	FW	1950–1951	37	12	
S. Trumper	England	FW	1945–1950	37	22	
T. Bradbury	unknown	FW	1938–1939	37	0	
Harry Loasby	England	FW	1930–1931	37	22	
A. Bull	England	HB	1904–1906	37	0	
W. Harris	unknown	GK	1901–1903	37	0	
Jim Gascoigne	unknown	GK	1895–1897	37	0	
Jack Nolan	England	FW	2024–2025	36	1	
Scott Kashket	England	FW	2022–2023	36	3	
Guylain Ndumbu-Nsungu	DR Congo	FW	2006–2007	36	5	
Darren Carr	England	DF	1998–1999	36	2	
George Shipley	England	MF	1987–1989	36	3	
Phil Handford	England	MF	1982–1984	36	2	
Dave Chadwick	England	FW	1974–1975	36	3	
Tommy Johnston	Scotland	FW	1961–1962	36	10	
Arthur Mills	England	FW	1933–1934	36	13	
Jim Forsyth	Scotland	HB	1928–1929	36	0	
Harry Wright	England	FW	1920–1921	36	0	
Charlie McGibbon	England	FW	1907–1908	36	22	
J. Fullerton	unknown	HB	1907–1908	36	0	
Jimmy Hartley	Scotland	FW	1906–1908	36	15	
S.R. Neame	unknown	HB	1900–1903	36	0	
Clint Easton	England	MF	2006–2007	36	1	
Seb Palmer-Houlden	England	FW	2025–2026	35	5	
Sam Vokes	Wales	FW	2025–2026	35	3	
Alfie Jones	Canada	DF/MF	2019–2020	35	2	
Jay Emmanuel-Thomas	England	FW	2016–2017	35	10	
Gavin Hoyte	Trinidad and Tobago	DF	2014–2015	35	0	
Antonio German	England	FW	2013–2015	35	3	
Delroy Facey	England	FW	2007–2008	35	3	
Vic Hole	England	FW	1945–1948	35	36	
Charlie Robinson	England	HB	1933–1935	35	0	
Stanley Amos	England	FW	1926–1928	35	12	
Jack Morris	England	FW	1904–1905	35	9	
Henry Clutterbuck	England	GK	1903–1904	35	0	
Ashley Nadesan	England	FW	2023–2025	34	3	
Danny Lloyd	England	MF	2021–2022	34	5	
Billy Bingham	England	MF	2017–2019	34	0	
Alex Lacey	England	DF	2017–2019	34	2	
Duncan Jupp	Scotland	DF	2006–2007	34	0	
Patrick Agyemang	Ghana	FW	2003–2005	34	8	
Charlie Young	England	DF	1977–1982	34	2	
Ronnie Clark	Scotland	FW	1956–1958	34	8	
John Durkin	Scotland	FW	1953–1955	34	6	
Harry Anstiss	England	FW	1934–1935	34	6	
Stuart McMillan	England	FW	1921–1922	34	2	
H.J. Salter	unknown	FW	1907–1908	34	8	
Charlie Satterthwaite	England	FW	1902–1903	34	14	
George Smith	England	FW	1902–1903	34	11	
Andrew Swan	Scotland	FW	1899–1900	34	7	
Harry Buckland	unknown	FW	1894–1896	34	10	
Darren Oldaker	England	MF	2015–2019	33	5	
Ian Chapman	England	DF	1996–1997	33	1	
Don Campbell	England	DF	1962–1964	33	0	
Sam Moore	England	FW	1958–1960	33	9	
Jim Taylor	England	FW	1956–1958	33	16	
R. Price	unknown	HB	1945–1947	33	2	
T. McGee	unknown	FW	1938–1939	33	11	
Harry Marsden	England	FB	1934–1935	33	0	
Harry Robotham	England	HB	1907–1908	33	0	
Harry Singleton	England	FW	1903–1904	33	1	
C. Evans	unknown	FW	1901–1906	33	0	
Ted Killean	England	FB	1901–1903	33	0	
James Blair	unknown	HB	1901–1902	33	1	
W. Humphrey	unknown	FB	1900–1902	33	0	
Hugh Gallacher	Scotland	FW	1897–1899	33	3	
Alec Gentle	unknown	HB	1896–1898	33	0	
Nelson Khumbeni	Malawi	MF	2025–	32	0	
Chris Pike	Wales	FW	1994–1995	32	18	
Richie Bowman	England	MF	1981–1983	32	7	
Joe Wilson	England	FB	1928–1930	32	10	
Albert Legge	England	FW	1928–1929	32	5	
Harry Bruce	England	FB	1928–1929	32	0	
Mark Bell	Scotland	HB	1912–1913	32	0	
James Lockie	England	FB	1899–1900	32	0	
Macauley Bonne	Zimbabwe	FW	2023–2024	31	5	
Hakeeb Adelakun	England	FW	2022–2023	31	1	
Dean Parrett	England	MF	2018–2019	31	1	
Ross Flitney	England	GK	2011–2013	31	0	
Jo Kuffour	Ghana	FW	2010–2012	31	9	
Kevin Rattray	England	MF	1995–1996	31	3	
Bill Fogarty	England	MF	1975–1977	31	0	
Bob Taylor	England	HB	1956–1959	31	5	
Arthur Fowler	England	FW	1935–1938	31	3	
Frank Taylor	England	FW	1928–1929	31	8	
A.J. Lissenden	unknown	FB	1912–1920	31	2	
George Walker	unknown	HB	1906–1907	31	0	
Ernie Watts	England	HB	1904–1905	31	0	
Joe Turner	England	FW	1904–1905	31	10	
James Carter	England	GK	1899–1900	31	0	
John Glover	England	FB	1899–1900	31	0	
Alex Jakubiak	England	FW	2019–2020	30	7	
Dean McDonald	England	FW	2006–2007	30	6	
Glen Thomas	England	DF	1995–1998	30	0	
David Byrne	England	FW	1985–1986	30	3	
Carl Gilbert	England	FW	1967–1970	30	11	
Leon Vaessen	England	MF	1961–1963	30	0	
Billy Armfield	England	FW	1932–1933	30	7	
George Buckle	England	GK	1931–1932	30	0	
Charlie Reddock	Scotland	HB	1925–1926	30	0	
George Massey	unknown	FW	1909–1912	30	2	
Jim Stevenson	unknown	FW	1903–1904	30	7	
W.E. Thomas	unknown	FW	1894–1897	30	3	
Lewis Walker	England	FW	2023–2024	29	4	
Elkan Baggott	Indonesia	DF	2022–2023	29	3	
Paul Konchesky	England	DF	2016–2017	29	0	
Craig Armstrong	England	DF	1996, 2007–2008	29	1	
Billy Death	England	FW	1930–1931	29	9	
J.M. Hawkes	unknown	FB	1909–1912	29	0	
Bill Henderson	Scotland	HB	1908–1909	29	0	
Arthur Archer	England	FB	1902–1903	29	0	
Teddy Daw	England	GK	1902–1903	29	0	
Charlie Bunyan	England	GK	1898–1899	29	0	
David Skea	Scotland	FW	1897–1898	29	12	
Amine Linganzi	Congo	MF	2013–2015	28	1	
Josh Pritchard	England	MF	2014–2015	28	0	
Peter Hunt	England	MF	1977–1978	28	0	
Pat Hilton	England	FW	1975–1977	28	1	
Neil O'Donnell	Scotland	MF	1974–1976	28	0	
Allan Scott	England	FW	1933–1934	28	12	
Horace Williams	Wales	FW	1922–1923	28	11	
Alex Steel	Scotland	HB	1919–1920	28	1	
Arthur Wolstenholme	England	FW	1912–1913	28	7	
Garath McCleary	Jamaica	FW	2025–	27	4	
Marcus Wyllie	England	FW	2024–2026	27	3	
Daniel Phillips	Trinidad and Tobago	MF	2021–2022	27	1	
Ben Nugent	England	DF	2017–2018	27	0	
Frank Nouble	England	FW	2011, 2016–2017	27	8	
Ben Chorley	England	MF	2006–2007	27	1	
Jimmy Fletcher	England	FW	1957–1958	27	13	
Dave Smith	Scotland	GK	1929–1931	27	0	
Albert Hook	England	HB	1924–1925	27	0	
Dick Edmed	England	FW	1923–1926	27	7	
David Fullarton	Scotland	HB	1908–1910	27	0	
Tom Pangbourne	England	FW	1899–1900	27	8	
Bill Ford	Scotland	FW	1897–1898	27	10	
F. Manning	unknown	HB	1894–1896	27	5	
Jordan Green	England	FW	2022–2023	26	1	
Mustapha Carayol	Gambia	FW	2021–2022	26	1	
Charlie Kelman	United States	FW	2021, 2022	26	2	
Matty Willock	Montserrat	MF	1997–1998	26	0	
Sean Clare	England	FW	2017–2018	26	1	
Brian Statham	England	DF	1997–1998	26	0	
Lenny Piper	England	MF	1996–1998	26	2	
Trevor Lewis	Wales	FW	1952–1955	26	2	
Jimmy Dodds	Ireland	FW	1936–1937	26	6	
Stan Hillier	England	FW	1926–1928	26	4	
H. Kelly	unknown	FW	1919–1920	26	1	
F. Cannon	England	FW	1910–1911	26	6	
Adam Haywood	England	FW	1900–1901	26	1	
Aaron Chapman	England	GK	2021–2022	26	2	
Glenn Aitken	England	DF	1972–1975	25	0	
Cliff Payton	England	FW	1958–1960	25	5	
Jim Bartley	England	FB	1926–1930	25	0	
Albert Richards	England	FW	1925–1926	25	4	
Harry Lee	England	FW	1919–1920	25	4	
Bill Hooper	England	FW	1914–1915	25	1	
Bert Powell	England	FW	1908–1909	25	3	
J. Cockrill	unknown	FB	1895–1897	25	1	

== See also ==
- List of Gillingham F.C. players, for those players with 50 or more appearances for the club
- List of Gillingham F.C. players (1–24 appearances)
