= 1929–30 Gillingham F.C. season =

English football club season

Gillingham
1929–30 season
- Chairman: Jack Knight
- Manager: Dick Hendrie
- Third Division South: 21st
- FA Cup: First round
- Top goalscorer: League: Fred Cheesmur (18); All: Fred Cheesmur (18)
- Highest home attendance: 8,160 vs Walsall (31 August 1929)
- Lowest home attendance: 1,889 vs Clapton Orient (16 November 1929)
Home colours

During the 1929–30 English football season, Gillingham F.C. competed in the Football League Third Division South, the third tier of the English football league system. It was the 10th season in which the club competed in the Football League. The team's results in the first half of the season were poor, with a run of 17 games during which they won only once; at the end of 1929 they were in 21st place out of 22 teams in the Third Division South league table. Results failed to improve until close to the end of the season, when Gillingham won four of their final six games, including a victory over Merthyr Town in which Fred Cheesmur scored six goals, a new club record haul for a single match. Despite this late improvement, Gillingham finished the season in 21st place; the club was required to apply for re-election to the League for the following season but retained its place.

Gillingham also competed in the FA Cup but lost in the first round to Margate of the Kent League in what was seen as a major upset. They played 43 competitive matches, winning 11, drawing 8, and losing 24. Cheesmur was the team's top goalscorer with 18 goals. He and George Bishop made the most appearances, both playing in 41 games. The highest recorded attendance at the club's home ground, Priestfield Road, was 8,160 for the opening game of the season against Walsall.

== Background and pre-season ==
Dick Hendrie took over as the club's new manager.

The 1929–30 season was Gillingham's 10th season playing in the Football League. The club had been one of the founder members of the Third Division in 1920. A year later, the division was re-branded the Third Division South when a parallel Third Division North was created. Gillingham had consistently struggled in the Third Division South, finishing in the top half of the league table only once. In the 1928–29 season, they had finished in last place (22nd), and been required to apply for re-election to the Football League for the following season. Shortly afterwards, Dick Hendrie, a former Gillingham player who had most recently served as player-assistant manager at Brentford, was appointed as Gillingham's new manager, replacing Albert Hoskins, who had resigned in late March.

Hendrie signed nearly an entire team of new players, including Jack Beacham, a half-back, and Thomas Brennan, a teenaged forward, from his former club Brentford. Additional forwards joining the club included Fred Castle from Chesterfield and Fred Cheesmur from Charlton Athletic, as well as two Scottish players, Jim McCafferty from Shieldmuir Celtic and Campbell Whyte from Third Lanark. Other players joining from clubs in Hendrie's native Scotland included the goalkeeper Dave Smith from Hamilton Academical and the full back John Geddes from Celtic. Albert Collins and George Bishop, both half-backs, were signed from Millwall and Merthyr Town respectively, the former for a transfer fee of £250, a new record for the highest fee paid by Gillingham to sign a player. The team wore Gillingham's usual kit of black and white striped shorts with white shorts and black socks.

== Third Division South ==
=== August–December ===
Jack Beacham was one of a number of players who made their Gillingham debuts in the first game of the season.

Gillingham's first match of the season took place at their home ground, Priestfield Road, against Walsall on 31 August. Smith, Beacham, Collins, Bishop, McCafferty, Cheesmur and Castle all made their debuts; Castle and Cheesmur scored the goals in a 2–1 victory for Gillingham. The Sunday Mercury wrote that Gillingham were "decidedly stronger than last season". The attendance of 8,160 would prove to be the largest crowd of the season at the stadium. Gillingham played six matches in September, of which they lost five. Their first away game of the season ended in a 3–0 defeat to Exeter City on 4 September; the Western Morning News wrote that "for Gillingham's defence the match was one long test, both of brains and stamina". After a 2–1 defeat away to Queens Park Rangers, Gillingham beat Exeter City 2–0 with goals from Cheesmur and Castle, but then lost three consecutive games without scoring a goal, losing 1–0 at home to Fulham and 2–0 away to both Luton Town and Norwich City. The losing run ended with a 1–1 draw with Crystal Palace in the final game of September; Gillingham were hampered by an early injury to Whyte, who "limped about at outside right for eighty minutes"^{[a]} according to the Sunday Dispatch. The same newspaper reported that Gillingham were "superior in midfield" but "woefully lacking in marksmanship".

Gillingham's first match of October was away to Plymouth Argyle, who were top of the Third Division South league table having won six of their first eight games. Plymouth took the lead in the first minute and went on to win 3–0. Gillingham lost again a week later; 19-year-old George Pateman scored a goal on his Football League debut, but Northampton Town had already scored three times and went on to win 3–1. In their next match, Gillingham drew 0–0 with Swindon Town despite having only ten players for more than half the match after Bishop suffered a head injury;^{[a]} the player subsequently received six stitches in the wound. A 2–0 defeat to Brighton & Hove Albion, in which Collins was sent off, left Gillingham in 22nd and last place in the Third Division South league table at the end of October. They began November with a 3–3 draw against Bristol Rovers; having been 3–1 down during the second half, Gillingham scored two goals to secure a draw and could have won but for a last-minute save by Bristol Rovers' goalkeeper. In their next game, away to Brentford, Cheesmur gave Gillingham the lead, but Brentford scored two goals, the second four minutes from the end of the game, to win 2–1. The Daily Herald said that Brentford "scarcely deserved both points".

On 16 November, Gillingham won for the first time in eleven matches when two goals from Cheesmur gave them a 2–0 victory at home to Clapton Orient, which took them up to 19th in the table. The attendance of 1,889 was the lowest of the season at Priestfield Road. Following their first victory for more than two months, Gillingham lost four of their next five matches, conceding five goals in three of them. On 23 November, they lost 5–0 to Coventry City; the Birmingham Gazette criticised Gillingham's forwards and said that their ineffectiveness served to increase the pressure on the team's defence. In their next league game, Gillingham again conceded five goals, losing 5–1 to Newport County; the Daily Herald reported that, had it not been for the skill of Gillingham's defenders, the defeat would have been even heavier. After a 2–0 defeat to Torquay United, Gillingham drew 1–1 with Merthyr Town, the only team below them in the league table. On Christmas Day, Gillingham played Bournemouth & Boscombe Athletic at Priestfield Road and lost 5–1. The result meant that they had not won for over a month and had been victorious only twice in their first 20 league matches of the season, but they then won their next two games, beginning with a victory over the same opponents on Boxing Day. Andy Durnion scored twice in a 2–1 Gillingham victory, the first time their opponents had been defeated at home during the season. Jack Beby replaced Smith in goal for the Boxing Day game and remained the team's regular goalkeeper for the rest of the season. Two days later, Durnion scored again as Gillingham won 2–1 away to Walsall; the Sunday Dispatch wrote that Gillingham adapted their style of play better to suit the muddy conditions. Despite the two victories, Gillingham remained in 21st place in the league table at the end of 1929.

=== January–May ===
Andy Durnion scored four goals in a match in February.

Gillingham's first match of 1930 was at home to Queens Park Rangers. Durnion scored his fourth goal in three games as Gillingham secured a third consecutive victory, winning 3–1. The result meant that they moved out of the bottom two places in the league table, rising to 20th; finishing the season any lower would result in another application for re-election. Following three wins in ten days, Gillingham lost their next four games. The losing run began with a 2–1 defeat at home to Watford on 11 January in a match played in heavy rain and bad light. On 18 January, Gillingham lost 2–1 away to Fulham, and a week later Norwich City won by the same score at Priestfield Road. February began with a 5–1 defeat away to Crystal Palace, the fourth time Gillingham had conceded five goals in a match since late November. The Sunday Dispatch wrote that Gillingham's players spent almost all of the second half defending, only occasionally making it out of their own half of the pitch. The run of defeats ended with a goalless draw with Plymouth Argyle, who were second in the league table going into the game. The Sunday Dispatch reported that Plymouth needed to improve their form if they wished to maintain their challenge for promotion and that Gillingham would have won the game had it not been for their "ineffective finishing".

On 15 February, Gillingham beat Northampton Town 5–2 at Priestfield Road. Durnion scored four goals, the first time a Gillingham player had scored more than three times in a Football League match. It would prove to be the team's last victory for nearly two months, however. Gillingham's final match of February ended in a 3–0 defeat to Swindon Town. In the first match of March, Gillingham took a 2–0 lead over Brighton & Hove Albion but then conceded two goals and had to settle for a draw. The Daily Herald wrote that Gillingham's forwards wasted many goalscoring chances and "fumbled and crowded each other out at the goalmouth". Gillingham's next five matches all ended in defeat, beginning with a 3–0 loss to Bristol Rovers on 8 March. A week later, Gillingham took an early lead against Brentford at Priestfield Road through Leonard Dowell but then conceded three goals and lost 3–1. The next game resulted in a 2–0 defeat to Clapton Orient. Cheesmur and Durnion both returned to the team for the game against Coventry City on 29 March, having been absent for the previous match, but neither scored and Gillingham lost 3–0. In their first match of April, Gillingham took a first-half lead over Watford through Brennan's first goal for the club, but then conceded four times and lost 4–1. The Sunday Dispatch described their play as "feeble" and said they resembled "a side without hope".

Having lost six of the preceding seven games, Gillingham's form changed dramatically as they ended the season with an unbeaten run of six matches, comprising four wins and two draws. On 12 April, they beat Newport County 5–0 at Priestfield Road. Fred Ellis, playing his first match for more than two months, scored the first goal and set up the second, and William Jones, who had returned to the team a week earlier having not played since January, scored the fifth. Cheesmur scored twice to take his goal tally for the season to 11. Gillingham next played three games in four days over the Easter weekend. On 18 April, Jones scored for the second consecutive game to secure a 1–0 victory over Southend United, and the following day Gillingham drew 1–1 with Torquay United. They continued their unbeaten run with a 0–0 draw against Southend United. In the penultimate game of the season, Gillingham played Merthyr Town, who were in 22nd place in the league table, having won only five games during the season and conceded 128 goals, nearly 40 more than any other team in the division. Gillingham won the match 6–0, Cheesmur scoring all the goals. It was the first time a Gillingham player had scored as many goals in a single game in any competition. The final match of the season was at home to Luton Town; Cheesmur and John Speed scored in a 2–0 win. Despite the late run of good results, Gillingham finished the season in 21st place in the league table, level on points with 20th-placed Bristol Rovers but with an inferior goal average.

=== League match details ===
Key

- In the result column, Gillingham's score is shown first
- H = Home match
- A = Away match
- pen. = Penalty kick
- o.g. = Own goal

Results

| Date | Opponents | Result | Goalscorers | Attendance |
|---|---|---|---|---|
| 31 August 1929 | Walsall (H) | 2–1 | Castle, Cheesmur | 8,160 |
| 4 September 1929 | Exeter City (A) | 0–3 | | 5,297 |
| 7 September 1929 | Queens Park Rangers (A) | 1–2 | Cheesmur | 11,875 |
| 11 September 1929 | Exeter City (H) | 2–0 | Cheesmur, Castle | 4,574 |
| 14 September 1929 | Fulham (H) | 0–1 | | 7,901 |
| 16 September 1929 | Luton Town (A) | 0–2 | | 7,168 |
| 21 September 1929 | Norwich City (A) | 0–2 | | 9,981 |
| 28 September 1929 | Crystal Palace (H) | 1–1 | Dowell | 6,818 |
| 5 October 1929 | Plymouth Argyle (A) | 0–3 | | 5,777 |
| 12 October 1929 | Northampton Town (A) | 1–3 | Pateman | 10,663 |
| 19 October 1929 | Swindon Town (H) | 0–0 | | 5,597 |
| 26 October 1929 | Brighton & Hove Albion (A) | 0–2 | | 7,504 |
| 2 November 1929 | Bristol Rovers (H) | 3–3 | Cheesmur, Collins, Pateman | 4,794 |
| 9 November 1929 | Brentford (A) | 1–2 | Cheesmur | 9,603 |
| 16 November 1929 | Clapton Orient (H) | 2–0 | Cheesmur (2) | 1,889 |
| 23 November 1929 | Coventry City (A) | 0–5 | | 8,755 |
| 7 December 1929 | Newport County (A) | 1–5 | Geddes | 1,991 |
| 14 December 1929 | Torquay United (H) | 0–2 | | 3,310 |
| 21 December 1929 | Merthyr Town (A) | 1–1 | Dowell | 1,352 |
| 25 December 1929 | Bournemouth & Boscombe Athletic (H) | 1–5 | Castle | 3,954 |
| 26 December 1929 | Bournemouth & Boscombe Athletic (A) | 2–1 | Durnion (2) | 11,481 |
| 28 December 1929 | Walsall (A) | 2–1 | Durnion, Dowell | 3,568 |
| 4 January 1930 | Queens Park Rangers (H) | 3–1 | Durnion, Whyte, Cheesmur | 5,961 |
| 11 January 1930 | Watford (H) | 1–2 | Whyte | 5,562 |
| 18 January 1930 | Fulham (A) | 1–2 | Dowell | 15,196 |
| 25 January 1930 | Norwich City (H) | 1–2 | Dowell | 3,249 |
| 1 February 1930 | Crystal Palace (A) | 1–5 | Whyte | 8,783 |
| 8 February 1930 | Plymouth Argyle (H) | 0–0 | | 4,905 |
| 15 February 1930 | Northampton Town (H) | 5–2 | Durnion (4), Cheesmur | 4,665 |
| 22 February 1930 | Swindon Town (A) | 0–3 | | 3,070 |
| 1 March 1930 | Brighton & Hove Albion (H) | 2–2 | Durnion, Dowell | 5,035 |
| 8 March 1930 | Bristol Rovers (A) | 0–3 | | 5,011 |
| 15 March 1930 | Brentford (H) | 1–3 | Dowell | 6,749 |
| 22 March 1930 | Clapton Orient (A) | 0–2 | | 9,348 |
| 29 March 1930 | Coventry City (H) | 0–3 | | 3,865 |
| 5 April 1930 | Watford (A) | 1–4 | Brennan | 4,787 |
| 12 April 1930 | Newport County (H) | 5–0 | Ellis, Bethell, Cheesmur (2), Jones | 2,743 |
| 18 April 1930 | Southend United (H) | 1–0 | Jones | 7,964 |
| 19 April 1930 | Torquay United (A) | 1–1 | Bethell | 3,472 |
| 21 April 1930 | Southend United (A) | 0–0 | | 9,036 |
| 26 April 1930 | Merthyr Town (H) | 6–0 | Cheesmur (6) | 3,513 |
| 3 May 1930 | Luton Town (H) | 2–0 | Cheesmur, Speed | 4,831 |

=== Partial league table ===
Football League Third Division South final table, bottom positions
| Pos | Team | Pld | W | D | L | GF | GA | GAv | Pts | |
|---|---|---|---|---|---|---|---|---|---|---|
| 19 | Torquay United | 42 | 10 | 11 | 21 | 64 | 94 | 0.681 | 31 | |
| 20 | Bristol Rovers | 42 | 11 | 8 | 23 | 67 | 93 | 0.720 | 30 | |
| 21 | Gillingham | 42 | 11 | 8 | 23 | 51 | 80 | 0.638 | 30 | Required to apply for re-election |
| 22 | Merthyr Town | 42 | 6 | 9 | 27 | 60 | 135 | 0.444 | 21 | Required to apply for re-election |

== FA Cup ==
Gillingham entered the 1929–30 FA Cup in the first round, and were paired with Margate of the Kent League, who had progressed from the qualifying rounds for the first time. Earlier in the season, Gillingham's reserve team had beaten Margate 4–0 in a Kent League match. In what was seen as a significant upset, Gillingham lost 2–0 to their lower-level opponents and were eliminated from the competition. Gillingham were awarded two penalty kicks during the match but Margate's goalkeeper saved both of them.

=== Cup match details ===
Key

- In result column, Gillingham's score shown first
- H = Home match
- A = Away match
- pen. = Penalty kick
- o.g. = Own goal

Results

| Date | Round | Opponents | Result | Goalscorers | Attendance |
|---|---|---|---|---|---|
| 30 November 1929 | First | Margate (H) | 0–2 | | 4,150 |

== Players ==
Jock Robertson made 30 appearances.

Twenty-seven players made at least one appearance for Gillingham during the season. Bishop and Cheesmur made the most, each playing in 41 of the team's 43 competitive matches; four other players each played more than 30 times. Ronald Baird was the only player to make just one appearance; he played against Coventry City in March, but it would prove to be the only Football League game of his career.

Thirteen players scored at least one goal for Gillingham during the season. Cheesmur was the top goalscorer with 18 goals, followed by Durnion with 9 goals, all scored within 10 appearances between 26 December and 1 March.

Player statistics
| Player | Position | Third Division South | | FA Cup | | Total | |
| Player | Position | Apps | Goals | Apps | Goals | Apps | Goals |
|---|---|---|---|---|---|---|---|
| Ronald Baird | FB | 1 | 0 | 0 | 0 | 1 | 0 |
| Jim Bartley | FB | 9 | 0 | 0 | 0 | 9 | 0 |
| Jack Beacham | HB | 35 | 0 | 1 | 0 | 36 | 0 |
| Jack Beby | GK | 20 | 0 | 0 | 0 | 20 | 0 |
| Roy Bethell | FW | 12 | 2 | 0 | 0 | 12 | 2 |
| George Bishop | HB | 40 | 0 | 1 | 0 | 41 | 0 |
| Thomas Brennan | FW | 7 | 1 | 0 | 0 | 7 | 1 |
| Fred Castle | FW | 16 | 3 | 0 | 0 | 16 | 3 |
| Fred Cheesmur | FW | 40 | 18 | 1 | 0 | 41 | 18 |
| Albert Collins | HB | 36 | 1 | 0 | 0 | 36 | 1 |
| Leonard Dowell | FW | 22 | 7 | 0 | 0 | 22 | 7 |
| Andy Durnion | FW | 19 | 9 | 1 | 0 | 20 | 9 |
| Fred Ellis | HB | 20 | 1 | 0 | 0 | 20 | 1 |
| John Geddes | FB | 11 | 1 | 1 | 0 | 12 | 1 |
| Syd Gore | FW | 32 | 0 | 1 | 0 | 33 | 0 |
| William Jones | HB | 12 | 2 | 0 | 0 | 12 | 2 |
| Sydney Martin | FW | 2 | 0 | 1 | 0 | 3 | 0 |
| Jim McCafferty | FW | 14 | 0 | 1 | 0 | 15 | 0 |
| George Pateman | FW | 7 | 2 | 0 | 0 | 7 | 2 |
| Jock Robertson | FB | 30 | 0 | 1 | 0 | 31 | 0 |
| Robert Robinson | HB | 2 | 0 | 0 | 0 | 2 | 0 |
| Jack Rutherford | GK | 2 | 0 | 0 | 0 | 2 | 0 |
| Dave Smith | GK | 20 | 0 | 1 | 0 | 21 | 0 |
| John Speed | FW | 6 | 1 | 0 | 0 | 6 | 1 |
| Campbell Whyte | FW | 24 | 3 | 0 | 0 | 24 | 3 |
| Joe Wilson | FB | 21 | 0 | 1 | 0 | 22 | 0 |
| Lewis Woolven | FW | 2 | 0 | 0 | 0 | 2 | 0 |

FW = Forward, HB = Half-back, GK = Goalkeeper, FB = Full-back

== Aftermath ==
As a result of finishing 21st, the club was required to apply for re-election for the second consecutive season; Gillingham secured the most votes out of the two clubs seeking re-election and four applicants from outside the league and therefore remained in the Third Division South for the following season. Over the next eight seasons, Gillingham finished in the lower half of the league table a further six times. At the conclusion of the 1937–38 season, Gillingham applied for re-election for the fifth time since 1920; on this occasion the club was voted out of the Football League. After playing in non-League football until and immediately after the Second World War, Gillingham returned to the Football League in 1950 when both Third Divisions were increased in size.

== Footnotes ==
a. The concept of substitutes was not introduced to English football until the 1960s; previously, an injured player had to play on or else the team had to continue with a reduced number of players.
