= 1937–38 Gillingham F.C. season =

English football club season

Gillingham
1937–38 season
- Chairman: Jack Knight
- Manager: Alan Ure
- Third Division South: 22nd
- FA Cup: First Round
- Third Division South Cup: Second Round
- Top goalscorer: League: Jimmy Watson (8); All: Jimmy Watson (13)
- Highest home attendance: 9,831 vs Millwall (9 October 1937)
- Lowest home attendance: 1,789 vs Clapton Orient (23 February 1938)
Home colours

During the 1937–38 English football season, Gillingham F.C. competed in the Football League Third Division South, the third tier of the English football league system. It was the 18th season in which Gillingham competed in the Football League. The team won only three times in nineteen Football League matches between August and December; in November and December they played six league games and lost every one without scoring a goal, leaving them bottom of the division at the end of 1937. Although Gillingham's performances improved in the second half of the season, with seven wins between January and May, they remained in last place at the end of the season, meaning that the club was required to apply for re-election to the League. The application was rejected, and as a result the club lost its place in the Football League and joined the regional Southern League.

Gillingham also competed in two knock-out competitions. The team were eliminated in the first round of the FA Cup but reached the second round of the Third Division South Cup. The team played 45 competitive matches, winning 11, drawing 6 and losing 28. Jimmy Watson was the club's top goalscorer with 8 goals in Third Division South matches and 13 in all competitions. Dave Whitelaw and Tug Wilson made the most appearances; both played 42 games. The highest attendance recorded at the club's home ground, Priestfield Road, during the season was 9,831 for a game against Millwall on 9 October 1937.

== Background and pre-season ==
The 1937–38 season was Gillingham's 18th season playing in the third and lowest level of the Football League. The club had been among the founder members of the Football League Third Division in 1920, which was renamed the Third Division South when a parallel Third Division North was created a year later. In Gillingham's 17 seasons in this division, the team had consistently struggled, only finishing in the top half of the league table three times. They had finished in the bottom two on four occasions, requiring them to apply each time for re-election to the League, most recently in the 1931–32 season.

Alan Ure was the club's manager; he had been appointed at the conclusion of the previous season following the resignation of Fred Maven. Jack Oxberry assisted him in the role of trainer. The club signed several players ahead of the new season, including half-back Jimmy Nichol, who arrived from Portsmouth. Nichol had spent three seasons with Gillingham in the 1920s and returned for a second spell with the club at the age of 34; he was appointed team captain. Other new signings included Bryan Dalton from Reading, Fred Smith from Exeter City, Albert Taylor from Lincoln City, Cyril Walker from Watford and Archie Young from Leicester City. The team wore Gillingham's usual kit of blue shirts and white shorts. Pre-season matches between Football League members were not permitted at the time, and clubs instead generally prepared for the season with a public trial match between two teams chosen from within their own squad of players. Gillingham staged such a match in August but it had to be abandoned at half-time due to torrential rain.

== Third Division South ==
=== August–December ===
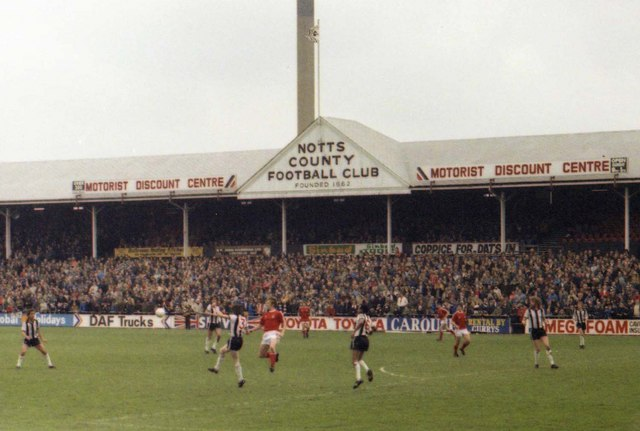
Gillingham's final match of 1937 took place at Meadow Lane, home of Notts County (pictured in 1981).

The club's first match of the season, on 28 August, was away to Bristol City; Nichol, Young, Smith, Walker, Taylor and Dalton all made their debuts and Taylor scored Gillingham's first goal of the season. Gillingham lost the match 3–1; the correspondent for the Sunday Dispatch wrote that they "did not impress". Four days later, Gillingham played the first game of the season at their home ground, Priestfield Road; a goal from Walker gave them a 1–0 win over Newport County. The Daily Herald's reporter praised Gillingham's full-backs and forwards but identified the poor quality of their half-backs as a "serious problem". After a draw against Watford, Gillingham lost three consecutive games. The run of defeats ended with a 5–3 victory away to Exeter City on 18 September, the most goals the team would score in a match during the season. Both Smith and Walker scored twice. Gillingham ended September 18th out of 22 teams in the Third Division South league table.

Gillingham's first four matches of October all resulted in defeat, beginning when they lost 2–0 away to Aldershot. A week later the team lost to Millwall; having been three goals down at half-time, Gillingham scored twice in the second half but lost 3–2. It was the last game that both Walker, who had only joined the club at the start of the season, and long-serving full-back Fred Lester played for the club; both were transferred to Sheffield Wednesday of the Second Division hours before Gillingham's next match. After two further defeats, Gillingham were bottom of the Third Division South table. Full-back George Tweed, a new signing from Bristol Rovers, made his debut on 23 October and would play in every game for the remainder of the season. The team ended their winless run by defeating Walsall in the final match of October and as a result moved above their opponents on goal average, ending the month in 21st place in the table.

During November and December Gillingham played six Third Division South games and lost every one without scoring a goal. The sequence began on 6 November with a 4–0 defeat away to Cardiff City. it continued with a 2–0 defeat at home to Bournemouth & Boscombe Athletic, after which Gillingham were bottom of the table. Gillingham next lost 1–0 away to Brighton & Hove Albion; the Sunday Pictorial's correspondent praised Gillingham's goalkeeper Dave Whitelaw and full-back Bill Armstrong for restricting the victors to one goal. After further defeats away to Southend United and Torquay United, Gillingham's last game of 1937 was a 1–0 defeat away to Notts County; the attendance of 23,337 at Meadow Lane was the largest in front of which Gillingham played during the season. The result meant that they finished the calendar year bottom of the Third Division South with 8 points from 19 games, 7 points below 21st-placed Aldershot.

=== January–May ===
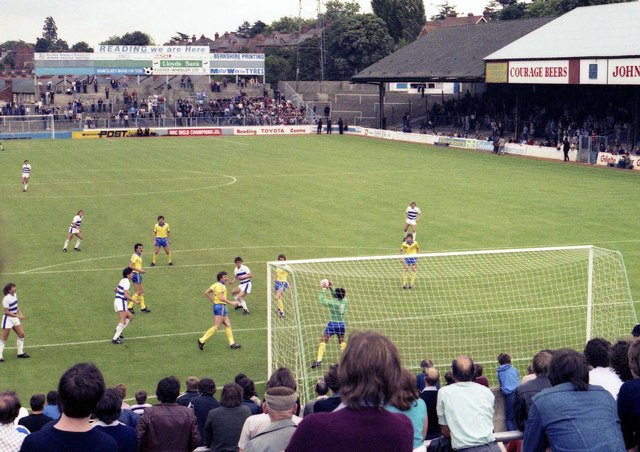
Gillingham's final match of the season took place at Elm Park, home of Reading (pictured in 1981).

Gillingham's first game of 1938 was at home to Bristol City; Albert Brallisford scored Gillingham's first league goal since October to give his team a 1–0 win. A week later, Gillingham lost again, being defeated 5–1 at home by Queens Park Rangers, the first time they had conceded as many goals during the season. The team remained unbeaten for the remainder of the month with two draws and a victory over Exeter City but stayed bottom of the table. Two young players, 20-year-old Charlie Campbell and 18-year-old Fred Herbert, made their Football League debuts against Exeter, and Herbert scored Gillingham's second goal. Herbert would remain a regular in the team for the rest of the season, missing only two matches. Gillingham lost four of their five games in February, the second a 5–0 defeat away to Millwall which was the team's heaviest defeat of the entire season; all the goals came in the second half. Gillingham finished the game with ten men after Frank Donoghue, making his Football League debut, was carried off injured. The game following the defeat to Millwall, a 2–1 defeat at home to Clapton Orient, drew an attendance of 1,789, the lowest of the season for any Gillingham game, either home or away.

In their first game of March, Gillingham defeated Northampton Town at Priestfield Road; Herbert scored twice to take his league tally to five goals in six games. After losing 3–1 away to Walsall, Gillingham won home games against Notts County on 16 March and Cardiff City three days later, the first time the team had won two consecutive games during the season. The reporter for the Daily Herald wrote that George Ballsom and Reginald Neal were "outstanding" against Cardiff but that overall the quality of the game was "rarely worthy of League class"; the victory lifted Gillingham off the bottom of the league table, putting them one point above Walsall. Gillingham lost 2–0 away to Bournemouth on 26 March but remained 21st in the table at the end of March.

Gillingham's first two matches of April resulted in a draw and a defeat, but they remained 21st in the table, one point above Walsall. In a nine-day period beginning on 15 April, Gillingham played four matches and lost three of them. The sequence began with a 3–0 defeat away to Crystal Palace; Norman Brickenden, a 23-year old goalkeeper, made his debut and was praised for his performance by the correspondent for The Daily News, but the same writer criticised Gillingham's forwards as "unbalanced" and "too individualistic" in their play. After beating Southend United the next day Gillingham lost again to Crystal Palace, taking a 2–0 lead in the first half before conceding four goals after the interval. The result left them once again bottom of the table. Gillingham lost two of their final three games, finishing with a 2–0 defeat away to Reading, the team's 26th league defeat of the season. Gillingham finished bottom of the division with 26 points from 42 games; the points total was the lowest and the number of defeats the highest recorded by the team in 18 seasons in the Football League.

=== Match details ===
Key

- In result column, Gillingham's score shown first
- H = Home match
- A = Away match
- pen. = Penalty kick
- o.g. = Own goal

Results

Date	Opponents	Result	Goalscorers	Attendance
28 August 1937	Bristol City (A)	1–3	Taylor	14,134
1 September 1937	Newport County (H)	1–0	Walker	6,295
4 September 1937	Watford (H)	0–0		8,408
9 September 1937	Newport County (A)	0–2		5,662
11 September 1937	Mansfield Town (A)	1–3	Watson	7,291
15 September 1937	Reading (H)	1–2	Watson	4,160
18 September 1937	Exeter City (A)	5–3	Wilson, F. Smith (2), Walker (2)	5,846
25 September 1937	Swindon Town (H)	0–0		5,792
2 October 1937	Aldershot (A)	0–2		5,238
9 October 1937	Millwall (H)	2–3	Watson, Wilson	9,831
16 October 1937	Bristol Rovers (H)	0–1		6,628
23 October 1937	Northampton Town (A)	1–4	Taylor	7,618
30 October 1937	Walsall (H)	3–0	Watson (2), Scott	4,328
6 November 1937	Cardiff City (A)	0–4		14,818
13 November 1937	Bournemouth & Boscombe Athletic (H)	0–2		4,648
20 November 1937	Brighton & Hove Albion (A)	0–1		7,701
4 December 1937	Southend United (A)	0–2		6,700
18 December 1937	Torquay United (A)	0–1		2,317
27 December 1937	Notts County (A)	0–1		23,337
1 January 1938	Bristol City (H)	1–0	Brallisford	5,126
8 January 1938	Queens Park Rangers (H)	1–5	Fowler	7,699
15 January 1938	Watford (A)	1–1	Watson	7,843
22 January 1938	Mansfield Town (H)	0–0		5,590
29 January 1938	Exeter City (H)	2–1	Fishlock, Herbert	3,844
5 February 1938	Swindon Town (A)	0–3		8,543
12 February 1938	Aldershot (H)	2–0	Herbert, Watson	3,138
19 February 1938	Millwall (A)	0–5		17,358
23 February 1938	Clapton Orient (H)	1–2	Herbert	1,789
26 February 1938	Bristol Rovers (A)	1–2	Taylor	4,289
5 March 1938	Northampton Town (H)	2–1	Herbert (2)	4,582
12 March 1938	Walsall (A)	1–3	Neal	3,665
16 March 1938	Notts County (H)	2–1	Watson, Hartley	3,949
19 March 1938	Cardiff City (H)	1–0	Herbert	6,710
26 March 1938	Bournemouth & Boscombe Athletic (A)	0–2		6,559
2 April 1938	Brighton & Hove Albion (H)	1–1	Wilson	6,450
9 April 1938	Queens Park Rangers (A)	0–2		10,356
15 April 1938	Crystal Palace (A)	0–3		15,390
16 April 1938	Southend United (H)	2–1	Brallisford, Neal	6,822
18 April 1938	Crystal Palace (H)	2–4	Herbert, Brallisford (pen.)	6,602
23 April 1938	Clapton Orient (A)	0–3		5,970
30 April 1938	Torquay United (H)	1–1	Fishlock	2,364
7 May 1938	Reading (A)	0–2		3,958

=== Partial league table ===
Football League Third Division South final table, bottom positions
Pos	Team	Pld	W	D	L	GF	GA	GAv	Pts	
19	Clapton Orient	42	13	7	22	42	61	0.689	33	
20	Torquay United	42	9	12	21	38	73	0.521	30	
21	Walsall	42	11	7	24	52	88	0.591	29	Required to apply for re-election
22	Gillingham	42	10	6	26	36	77	0.468	26	Required to apply for re-election

== Cup matches ==
=== FA Cup ===
As a Third Division South club, Gillingham entered the 1937–38 FA Cup in the first round, where they were paired with fellow Third Division South club Swindon Town. Jimmy Watson scored Gillingham's only hat-trick of the season, including two goals from penalty kicks, but Gillingham lost 4–3 and were eliminated from the competition.

==== Match details ====
Key

- In result column, Gillingham's score shown first
- H = Home match
- A = Away match
- pen. = Penalty kick
- o.g. = Own goal

Results

Date	Round	Opponents	Result	Goalscorers	Attendance
27 November 1937	First	Swindon Town (H)	3–4	Watson (3, 2 pen.)	5,000

=== Third Division South Cup ===
Gillingham entered the 1937–38 Third Division South Cup in the first round, where they played Brighton & Hove Albion. In front of an attendance of 2,000, one of the lowest of the season at Priestfield Road, Watson scored twice in a 3–1 win for Gillingham. In the second round, Gillingham played Millwall. Several fringe players were brought into the team in place of regular starters, and Gillingham lost 4–0, ending their participation in the competition.

==== Match details ====
Key

- In result column, Gillingham's score shown first
- H = Home match
- A = Away match
- pen. = Penalty kick
- o.g. = Own goal

Results

Date	Round	Opponents	Result	Goalscorers	Attendance
28 September 1937	First	Brighton & Hove Albion (H)	3–1	Watson (2), Walker	2,000
8 November 1937	Second	Millwall (A)	0–4		2,000

== Players ==
During the season, 32 players made at least one appearance for Gillingham. Whitelaw and forward Tug Wilson made the most; both played in 42 of the team's 45 competitive matches. Full-back Syd Hartley was the only other player to take part in 40 or more matches. Four players made only one appearance each, including Richard Maudsley, who played in one Third Division South Cup game but never made an appearance in the Football League for Gillingham or any other club. Bill Williams also played his only game for the club during the season; Leslie Williams made his sole Football League appearance for Gillingham during the season but remained with the club and played non-League football the following season, as did Donoghue, whose one Football League game for Gillingham during the season was the only appearance he made in the competition during his career. Watson was the team's top goalscorer, with eight goals in the Third Division South and five in the cup competitions. He was the only player to reach double figures; Herbert had the second-highest total, despite playing in fewer than half the team's games, with seven goals.

Player statistics
Player	Position	Third Division South		FA Cup		Third Division South Cup		Total	
Player	Position	Apps	Goals	Apps	Goals	Apps	Goals	Apps	Goals
Bill Armstrong	FB	27	0	1	0	2	0	30	0
George Ballsom	FB	20	0	1	0	0	0	21	0
Albert Brallisford	FW	14	3	1	0	0	0	15	3
Norman Brickenden	GK	3	0	0	0	0	0	3	0
Charlie Campbell	HB	7	0	0	0	1	0	8	0
Bryan Dalton	FW	6	0	0	0	1	0	7	0
Frank Donoghue	HB	1	0	0	0	0	0	1	0
William Duncan	FW	2	0	0	0	0	0	2	0
George Emmerson	FW	10	0	0	0	0	0	10	0
Laurie Fishlock	FW	20	2	0	0	0	0	20	2
Arthur Fowler	FW	8	1	0	0	1	0	9	1
Syd Hartley	FB	38	1	0	0	2	0	40	1
Fred Herbert	FW	17	7	0	0	1	0	18	7
George Holland	HB	10	0	1	0	0	0	11	0
John Jones	HB	5	0	0	0	0	0	5	0
Fred Lester	FB	10	0	0	0	1	0	11	0
Richard Maudsley	FW	0	0	0	0	1	0	1	0
Reginald Neal	FW	14	2	0	0	0	0	14	2
Jimmy Nichol	HB	8	0	0	0	1	0	9	0
James O'Neill	HB	8	0	0	0	0	0	8	0
Edwin Scott	FW	18	1	1	0	1	0	20	1
Fred Smith	FW	15	2	1	0	1	0	17	2
John Smith	HB	14	0	0	0	0	0	14	0
Albert Taylor	FW	9	3	0	0	1	0	10	3
George Tweed	FB	31	0	1	0	1	0	33	0
Cyril Walker	FW	10	3	0	0	1	1	11	4
Jimmy Watson	FW	35	8	1	3	2	2	38	13
Dave Whitelaw	GK	39	0	1	0	2	0	42	0
Bill Williams	HB	1	0	0	0	0	0	1	0
Leslie Williams	HB	1	0	0	0	0	0	1	0
Tug Wilson	FW	40	3	1	0	1	0	42	3
Archie Young	HB	21	0	1	0	1	0	23	0

FW = Forward, HB = Half-back, GK = Goalkeeper, FB = Full-back

== Aftermath ==
As a result of finishing last, Gillingham were again required to apply for re-election. The only non-League club to apply to join the Third Division South was Ipswich Town, who had finished third in the Southern League. They joined the two bottom teams in the division, Walsall and Gillingham, in a ballot among the League's member clubs for two places in the division for the subsequent season. Ipswich received 36 votes, Walsall 34, and Gillingham 28, meaning that Ipswich were elected to the Football League and Gillingham lost their place. After initial rumours that the club would fold completely, Gillingham returned to the Southern League and finished third in that league's First Division in the 1938–39 season. The club applied to rejoin the Football League at the first opportunity, but the application was rejected. Gillingham would be elected back into the Football League when the two Third Divisions were expanded from 22 to 24 clubs each in 1950.
