= Jimmy Dodd =

Jimmy Dodd may refer to:

- Jimmie Dodd (1910–1964), MC of the 1950s Walt Disney television series The Mickey Mouse Club
- Jimmy Dodd (footballer) (born 1933), footballer for Tranmere Rovers
- Jimmy Dodd (rugby union), English rugby union footballer

== See also ==
- James Dodd (disambiguation)
- Jimmy Dodds (1914–1942), footballer
