= Vaessen =

Vaessen is a Dutch patronymic surname. Vaes, modern spelling Vaas of Faas, was a short form of the given name Servaas (after Saint Servais). Variant forms are Faassen, Faessen, Vaassen, Vaes, and Vaesen. Notable people with the surname include:

- Elly Coenen-Vaessen (1932–2020), Dutch VVD politician and mayor of Nuth (1986–1997)
- Etienne Vaessen (born 1995), Dutch football goalkeeper
- Ilse Vaessen (born 1986), Dutch badminton player
- Jos Vaessen (born 1944), Belgian businessman
- Leon Vaessen (born 1940), English footballer
- Marie-Louise Vaessen (1928–1993), Dutch swimmer
- Paul Vaessen (1961–2001), English footballer, son of Leon
- Step Vaessen (born 1965), Dutch broadcast journalist

Vaesen

- Daan Vaesen (born 1981), Belgian football defender
- Nico Vaesen (born 1969), Belgian football goalkeeper
- William Vaesen (born 1974), Belgian singer and radio presenter known as Niels William

Vaes

- Stefaan Vaes (born 1976), Belgian mathematician
- Wouter Vaes, Dutch darts player

Faassen

- Rosier Faassen (1833–1907), Dutch stage actor and playwright
