= Patrick Bradley =

Patrick Bradley may refer to:

- Pat Bradley (boxer) (1884–1976), Irish born American champion welterweight boxer
- Patrick Bradley (footballer) (1902–?), Scottish footballer
- Patrick Bradley (rower), English rower
- Patrick Bradley, architect and former presenter of Home of the Year
- Pat Bradley (footballer, born 1972), Australian footballer, see 1994–95 NSL Cup
- Pat Bradley (basketball) (born 1976), (male), American basketball player and coach
- Paddy Bradley (born 1981), Irish Gaelic footballer

== See also ==
- Pat Bradley (golfer)
