= James Dodd =

James Dodd may refer to:

- James Dodd (artist), Australian artist
- James Dodd (footballer), English footballer
- James C. Dodd (1923–1999), African American architect, and founder of NOMA
- James Jonas Dodd (1863–1925), English political activist
- James William Dodd (1740–1796), English actor
- James Munro Dodd (1915–1986), marine biologist
- Jimmy Dodd (footballer) (born 1933), English footballer
- Jimmie Dodd (James William Dodd, 1910–1964), American actor, singer and songwriter

== See also ==
- James Dodds (disambiguation)
- Jimmy Dodd (disambiguation)
