= 1928–29 Brentford F.C. season =

English football team season

Brentford F.C.
1928–29 season
- Chairman: Louis P. Simon
- Manager: Harry Curtis
- Stadium: Griffin Park
- Third Division South: 13th
- FA Cup: Second round
- Top goalscorer: League: Watkins (14); All: Watkins (14)
- Highest home attendance: 20,783
- Lowest home attendance: 3,366
- Average home league attendance: 8,159
Home colours

During the 1928–29 English football season, Brentford competed in the Football League Third Division South. An unbeaten start to the season was cancelled out by a run of 11 defeats in 12 games which left the Bees bottom of the Football League, but the team recovered to finish in mid-table.

== Season summary ==
Brentford's 1928–29 team photograph.

Still in search of a winning formula after two mid-table finishes, Brentford manager Harry Curtis elected to add to rather than remodel of his squad during the 1928 off-season. In came goalkeeper Freddie Fox, full back Baden Herod for a £1,500 club record fee, half back Reginald Davies and a number of young forwards. He also brought in his former Gillingham trainer Bob Kane. Youngster Joe Wiggins broke Brentford's outgoing transfer record in May 1928, with Leicester City paying £1,400 for a centre forward who had made just four senior appearances and scored two goals.

Good goalscoring form from Jack Lane and Jack Phillips at the start of the season saw Brentford go seven matches unbeaten and rise to the top of the table. Phillips was then sold to Bristol Rovers and a run of 12 league matches without a win (including a club record-equalling 9 league defeats in a row) plummeted the club to the bottom of the Football League. Manager Curtis was offered the manager's job of an unnamed Second Division club in mid-October, but elected to stay at Griffin Park.

In November 1928, Manager Harry Curtis pulled off a crucial £500 signing of Jimmy Bain from Manchester Central and the centre half galvanised the team. Just three defeats in 18 matches between Boxing Day 1928 and April Fools' Day 1929 averted any fears of having to campaign for re-election. Manager Curtis decided to cash in on club record signing Baden Herod, who was sold for a then-club record outgoing fee of £4,000 to Tottenham Hotspur in February 1929. Just one draw from the final five matches of the season dropped Brentford to a final placing of 13th. A minor competition, the London Charity Fund, was won in November 1928 and gold medals were presented to the players involved.

== League table ==
Pos	Team	Pld	W	D	L	GF	GA	GAv	Pts
11	Coventry City	42	14	14	14	62	57	1.088	42
12	Southend United	42	15	11	16	80	75	1.067	41
13	Brentford	42	14	10	18	56	60	0.933	38
14	Walsall	42	13	12	17	73	79	0.924	38
15	Brighton & Hove Albion	42	16	6	20	58	76	0.763	38

== Results ==
Brentford's goal tally listed first.

=== Legend ===
Win	Draw	Loss

=== Football League Third Division South ===
No.	Date	Opponent	Venue	Result	Attendance	Scorer(s)
1	25 August 1928	Exeter City	H	4–2	11,158	Phillips (2), Drinnan, Berry
2	1 September 1928	Southend United	A	1–1	8,082	McKinley
3	3 September 1928	Charlton Athletic	H	1–0	6,850	Lane
4	8 September 1928	Merthyr Town	H	2–1	9,153	Lane, Phillips
5	10 September 1928	Swindon Town	H	2–0	7,231	Lane, Phillips
6	15 September 1928	Bournemouth & Boscombe Athletic	A	1–1	7,573	Watkins
7	22 September 1928	Queens Park Rangers	H	1–1	20,783	Lane
8	29 September 1928	Luton Town	H	0–1	13,758	
9	6 October 1928	Coventry City	A	0–1	16,993	
10	13 October 1928	Northampton Town	H	2–2	9,260	Watkins (2)
11	20 October 1928	Bristol Rovers	A	0–2	9,316	
12	27 October 1928	Watford	H	0–1	8,301	
13	3 November 1928	Walsall	A	0–2	7,937	
14	10 November 1928	Newport County	H	1–3	5,395	Lane
15	17 November 1928	Crystal Palace	A	0–1	11,323	
16	1 December 1928	Torquay United	A	1–4	4,614	Berry
17	15 December 1928	Plymouth Argyle	A	0–4	10,940	
18	22 December 1928	Fulham	H	1–2	8,876	Watkins
19	25 December 1928	Brighton & Hove Albion	A	2–3	8,600	Douglas, Durnion
20	26 December 1928	Brighton & Hove Albion	H	5–1	5,117	Lane (4), Sherlaw
21	29 December 1928	Exeter City	A	3–2	6,124	Drinnan, Watkins, Sherlaw
22	5 January 1929	Southend United	H	1–0	4,588	Drinnan
23	12 January 1929	Gillingham	H	4–1	5,042	Douglas (2), Watkins, Sherlaw
24	19 January 1929	Merthyr Town	A	2–2	2,500	Drinnan, Sherlaw
25	26 January 1929	Gillingham	A	2–1	3,756	Watkins, Douglas
26	2 February 1929	Queens Park Rangers	A	2–2	10,590	Sherlaw (2)
27	9 February 1929	Luton Town	A	1–2	8,148	Lawson
28	16 February 1929	Coventry City	H	1–0	3,950	Watkins
29	23 February 1929	Northampton Town	A	1–1	8,555	Watkins
30	2 March 1929	Bristol Rovers	H	2–0	6,991	Sherlaw, Drinnan
31	9 March 1929	Watford	A	0–2	10,453	
32	13 March 1929	Bournemouth & Boscombe Athletic	H	0–0	3,366	
33	16 March 1929	Walsall	H	1–0	7,111	Douglas
34	23 March 1929	Newport County	A	1–1	3,090	Douglas
35	29 March 1929	Norwich City	H	4–0	10,049	Stone (2), Watkins (2)
36	30 March 1929	Crystal Palace	H	2–4	13,314	Watkins, Berry
37	1 April 1929	Norwich City	A	4–2	9,713	Berry (2), Watkins (2)
38	6 April 1929	Swindon Town	A	1–3	3,107	Gamble
39	13 April 1929	Torquay United	H	0–0	4,507	
40	22 April 1929	Charlton Athletic	A	0–1	8,017	
41	27 April 1929	Plymouth Argyle	H	0–2	6,532	
42	4 May 1929	Fulham	A	0–1	16,524	

=== FA Cup ===
Round	Date	Opponent	Venue	Result	Attendance	Scorer(s)
1R	24 November 1928	Brighton & Hove Albion	H	4–1	10,000	Drinnan, Lane (2), Sherlaw
2R	8 December 1928	Plymouth Argyle	H	0–1	10,681	

- Sources: Statto, 11v11, 100 Years of Brentford

== Playing squad ==
Players' ages are as of the opening day of the 1928–29 season.

Pos.	Name	Nat.	Date of birth (age)	Signed from	Signed in	Notes
Goalkeepers
GK	Henry Bailey	(England)	2 December 1897 (aged 30)	Exeter City	1927	
GK	Freddie Fox	(England)	22 November 1898 (aged 29)	Halifax Town	1928	
Defenders
DF	George Dumbrell	(England)	23 September 1906 (aged 21)	Dartford	1928	
DF	Alexander Stevenson	(Scotland)	24 October 1903 (aged 24)	Armadale	1927	
DF	Ted Winship	(England)	1900 (aged 27–28)	Kidderminster Harriers	1926	
Midfielders
HB	Jimmy Bain	(Scotland)	6 February 1899 (aged 29)	Manchester Central	1928	
HB	Jack Beacham	(England)	15 August 1902 (aged 26)	Weymouth	1925	
HB	Reginald Davies (c)	(England)	30 September 1897 (aged 30)	Portsmouth	1928	
HB	Stephen Dearn	(England)	March 1901 (aged 27)	Portsmouth	1926	
HB	William Hodge	(Scotland)	31 August 1904 (aged 23)	Rangers	1927	
HB	Charlie Reddock	(Scotland)	1902 (aged 25–26)	Gillingham	1926	
HB	Teddy Ware	(England)	17 September 1906 (aged 21)	Chatham Town	1928	
HB	Martin Woosnam	(Wales)	1903 (aged 24–25)	Ealing Association	1928	Amateur
Forwards
FW	Bill Berry	(England)	18 August 1904 (aged 24)	Gillingham	1926	
FW	Alfred Douglas	(England)	26 March 1899 (aged 29)	Washington Colliery	1925	
FW	Jimmy Drinnan	(Scotland)	28 May 1906 (aged 22)	Newport County	1927	
FW	Andy Durnion	(Scotland)	18 February 1907 (aged 21)	St Joseph's	1928	
FW	Frederick Gamble	(England)	29 May 1905 (aged 23)	Southall	1928	
FW	Jack Lane	(England)	29 May 1898 (aged 30)	Chesterfield	1925	
FW	Herbert Lawson	(England)	12 April 1905 (aged 23)	Arsenal	1927	
FW	Charles McKinley	(England)	13 September 1902 (aged 25)	Leyton	1928	
FW	Albert Richards	(England)	18 July 1903 (aged 25)	Chatham Town	1928	
FW	David Sherlaw	(Scotland)	17 September 1901 (aged 26)	Charlton Athletic	1928	
FW	Norman Stone	(England)	1904 (aged 23–24)	Corinthian	1928	Amateur
FW	Ernie Watkins	(England)	3 April 1898 (aged 30)	Southend United	1926	
FW	Alexander Wood	(Scotland)	1906 (aged 21–22)	Airdrieonians	1928	
Players who left the club mid-season
DF	Baden Herod	(England)	16 May 1900 (aged 28)	Charlton Athletic	1928	Transferred to Tottenham Hotspur
HB	Andrew Heeps	(Scotland)	15 December 1899 (aged 28)	Airdrieonians	1928	Transferred to Camelon Juniors
HB	Albert Purdy	(England)	15 March 1899 (aged 29)	Southend United	1928	Transferred to Dartford
FW	Jack Phillips	(Wales)	28 May 1903 (aged 25)	Merthyr Town	1927	Transferred to Bristol Rovers

- Sources: Timeless Bees, Football League Players' Records 1888 to 1939, 100 Years Of Brentford

== Coaching staff ==
Name	Role
(England) Harry Curtis	Manager
(Scotland) Dick Hendrie	Assistant manager
(England) Bob Kane	Trainer
(England) Jack Cartmell	Assistant trainer

== Statistics ==
=== Appearances and goals ===

Brentford's highest appearance-makers in each position during the Football League season.

Pos	Nat	Name	League		FA Cup		Total	
Pos	Nat	Name	Apps	Goals	Apps	Goals	Apps	Goals
GK	(England)	Henry Bailey	29	0	1	0	30	0
GK	(England)	Freddie Fox	13	0	1	0	14	0
DF	(England)	George Dumbrell	3	0	0	0	3	0
DF	(England)	Baden Herod	28	0	2	0	30	0
DF	(Scotland)	Alexander Stevenson	21	0	0	0	21	0
DF	(England)	Ted Winship	34	0	2	0	36	0
HB	(Scotland)	Jimmy Bain	25	0	1	0	26	0
HB	(England)	Jack Beacham	15	0	0	0	15	0
HB	(England)	Reginald Davies	36	0	2	0	38	0
HB	(England)	Stephen Dearn	12	0	0	0	12	0
HB	(Scotland)	Andrew Heeps	2	0	0	0	2	0
HB	(Scotland)	William Hodge	3	0	2	0	5	0
HB	(England)	Albert Purdy	1	0	0	0	1	0
HB	(Scotland)	Charlie Reddock	3	0	0	0	3	0
HB	(England)	Teddy Ware	25	0	0	0	25	0
HB	(Wales)	Martin Woosnam	1	0	0	0	1	0
FW	(England)	Bill Berry	23	5	1	0	24	5
FW	(England)	Alfred Douglas	24	6	1	0	25	6
FW	(Scotland)	Jimmy Drinnan	25	5	2	1	27	6
FW	(Scotland)	Andy Durnion	2	1	0	0	2	1
FW	(England)	Frederick Gamble	7	1	—		7	1
FW	(England)	Jack Lane	32	9	1	2	33	11
FW	(England)	Herbert Lawson	8	1	1	0	9	1
FW	(England)	Charles McKinley	14	1	1	0	15	1
FW	(Wales)	Jack Phillips	6	4	—		6	4
FW	(England)	Albert Richards	2	0	0	0	2	0
FW	(Scotland)	David Sherlaw	27	7	2	1	29	8
FW	(England)	Norman Stone	4	2	0	0	4	2
FW	(England)	Ernie Watkins	36	14	2	0	38	14
FW	(Scotland)	Alexander Wood	1	0	0	0	1	0

- Players listed in italics left the club mid-season.
- Source: 100 Years of Brentford

=== Goalscorers ===
Pos.	Nat	Player	FL3	FAC	Total
FW	(England)	Ernie Watkins	14	0	14
FW	(England)	Jack Lane	9	2	11
FW	(Scotland)	David Sherlaw	7	1	8
FW	(England)	Alfred Douglas	6	0	6
FW	(Scotland)	Jimmy Drinnan	5	1	6
FW	(England)	Bill Berry	5	0	5
FW	(Wales)	Jack Phillips	4	—	4
FW	(England)	Norman Stone	2	0	2
FW	(England)	Frederick Gamble	1	—	1
FW	(Scotland)	Andy Durnion	1	0	1
FW	(England)	Herbert Lawson	1	0	1
FW	(England)	Charles McKinley	1	0	1
Total			56	4	60

- Players listed in italics left the club mid-season.
- Source: 100 Years of Brentford

=== Amateur international caps ===
Pos.	Nat	Player	Caps	Goals	Ref
HB	(Wales)	Martin Woosnam	1	0	

=== Management ===
Name	Nat	From	To	Record All Comps					Record League				
Name	Nat	From	To	P	W	D	L	W %	P	W	D	L	W %
Harry Curtis	(England)	25 August 1928	4 May 1929	44	15	10	19	34.09|	42	14	10	18	33.33

=== Summary ===
Games played	44 (42 Third Division South, 2 FA Cup)
Games won	15 (14 Third Division South, 1 FA Cup)
Games drawn	10 (10 Third Division South, 0 FA Cup)
Games lost	19 (18 Third Division South, 1 FA Cup)
Goals scored	60 (56 Third Division South, 4 FA Cup)
Goals conceded	62 (60 Third Division South, 2 FA Cup)
Clean sheets	9 (9 Third Division South, 0 FA Cup)
Biggest league win	4–0 versus Norwich City, 29 March 1929; 5–1 versus Brighton & Hove Albion, 26 December 1928
Worst league defeat	4–0 versus Plymouth Argyle, 15 December 1928
Most appearances	38, Reginald Davies, Ernie Watkins (36 Third Division South, 2 FA Cup)
Top scorer (league)	14, Ernie Watkins
Top scorer (all competitions)	14, Ernie Watkins

== Transfers & loans ==
Cricketers are not included in this list.

Players transferred in
Date	Pos.	Name	Previous club	Fee	Ref.
May 1928	HB	(Scotland) Andrew Heeps	(Scotland) Airdrieonians	Free	
May 1928	FW	(England) Charles McKinley	(England) Leyton	Free	
17 June 1928	DF	(England) Baden Herod	(England) Charlton Athletic	£1,500	
June 1928	HB	(England) Reginald Davies	(England) Portsmouth	£250	
June 1928	HB	(England) Albert Purdy	(England) Southend United	Free	
September 1928	FW	(Scotland) David Sherlaw	(England) Charlton Athletic	n/a	
November 1928	HB	(Scotland) Jimmy Bain	(England) Manchester Central	£500	
November 1928	FW	(England) Norman Stone	(England) Corinthian	Amateur	
1928	DF	(England) George Dumbrell	(England) Dartford	Free	
1928	FW	(England) Frederick Gamble	(England) Southall	Free	
1928	FW	(England) Albert Richards	(England) Chatham Town	Free	
1928	FW	(Scotland) Alexander Wood	(Scotland) Airdrieonians	Free	
1928	HB	(Wales) Martin Woosnam	(England) Ealing Association	Amateur	
Players transferred out
Date	Pos.	Name	Subsequent club	Fee	Ref.
May 1928	FW	(England) Joe Wiggins	(England) Leicester City	£1,400	
26 September 1928	FW	(Wales) Jack Phillips	(England) Bristol Rovers	n/a	
December 1928	HB	(England) Albert Purdy	(England) Dartford	n/a	
27 February 1929	DF	(England) Baden Herod	(England) Tottenham Hotspur	£4,000	
Players released
Date	Pos.	Name	Subsequent club	Join date	Ref.
14 July 1928	HB	(Scotland) Frank Marshall	Died of tuberculosis		
February 1929	HB	(Scotland) Andrew Heeps	(Scotland) Camelon Juniors	n/a	
May 1929	GK	(England) Henry Bailey	(England) Thames	1929	
May 1929	HB	(England) Jack Beacham	(England) Gillingham	1929	
May 1929	FW	(Scotland) Thomas Brennan	(England) Gillingham	August 1929	
May 1929	FW	(England) Stephen Dearn	Retired		
May 1929	FW	(Scotland) Jimmy Drinnan	(England) Luton Town	1929	
May 1929	FW	(Scotland) Dick Hendrie	Retired		
May 1929	FW	(Scotland) Jim McCafferty	(Scotland) Shieldmuir Celtic	1929	
May 1929	FW	(England) Charles McKinley	Retired		
May 1929	FW	(England) Len Ramsell	Retired		
May 1929	FW	(England) Albert Richards	(England) Dartford	1929	
May 1929	FW	(England) Norman Stone	Retired		
May 1929	FW	(Scotland) Alexander Wood	(England) Charlton Athletic	1929	
