= Jim Bartley =

Jim Bartley may refer to:

- Jim Bartley (footballer) (c. 1902–1939), English footballer
- Jim Bartley (actor) (born 1945), Irish actor
