= Martin Woosnam =

English footballer

Personal information
- Full name: Martin Herbert Woosnam
- Date of birth: 1903
- Place of birth: Clun, England
- Date of death: 1962 (aged 58–59)
- Position: Centre half

Senior career*
Years	Team	Apps	(Gls)
- Ealing Association
1928–1931	Brentford	1	(0)
1931–1932	Thames	21	
c. 1932	Club Français		

International career
1929	Wales Amateurs	1	(0)
- * Club domestic league appearances and goals

Martin Woosnam (1903–1962) was an amateur footballer who played as a centre half in the Football League for Thames and Brentford. Born in England, he represented Wales at amateur international level.

== Career statistics ==
Appearances and goals by club, season and competition
Club	Season	League			FA Cup		Total	
Club	Season	Division	Apps	Goals	Apps	Goals	Apps	Goals
Brentford	1928–29	Third Division South	1	0	0	0	1	0
Career total			1	0	0	0	1	0
