= Norman Stone (footballer) =

English footballer

Personal information
- Full name: Norman Willoughby B. Stone
- Date of birth: 1904
- Place of birth: Brentford, England
- Date of death: 1957 (aged 52–53)
- Position: Centre forward

Senior career*
Years	Team	Apps	(Gls)
- Bank of England
- Corinthian
1928–1929	Brentford	4	(2)
- * Club domestic league appearances and goals

Norman Willoughby B. Stone (1904–1957) was an English amateur footballer who played as a centre forward in the Football League for Brentford.

== Honours ==
Brentford

- London Charity Fund: 1928

== Career statistics ==
Appearances and goals by club, season and competition
Club	Season	League			FA Cup		Total	
Club	Season	Division	Apps	Goals	Apps	Goals	Apps	Goals
Brentford	1928–29	Third Division South	4	2	0	0	4	2
Career total			4	2	0	0	4	2
