= Alexander Wood (footballer) =

Scottish footballer

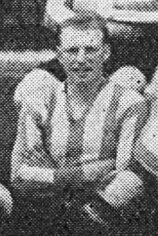
- Wood while with Brentford in 1928.

Personal information
- Full name: Alexander Wood
- Date of birth: 1906
- Place of birth: Glasgow, Scotland
- Position: Inside forward

Youth career
- Greenock Overton

Senior career*
Years	Team	Apps	(Gls)
1924–1928	Airdrieonians	18	(4)
- → Albion Rovers (loan)
1928–1929	Brentford	1	(0)
1929	Charlton Athletic	1	(0)
1930	Fulham	0	(0)
- * Club domestic league appearances and goals

Alexander Wood was a Scottish professional footballer who played as an inside forward in the Scottish League for Airdrieonians.

== Career ==
An inside forward, Wood began his career with high-flying Scottish League First Division club Airdrieonians and spent four years with the club. Wood moved to England to sign for Third Division South club Brentford prior to the beginning of the 1928–29 season. He had to wait until 23 February 1929 for his only appearance, filling in for the injured Jack Lane in a 1–1 draw with Northampton Town. He departed the Bees at the end of the season and had abortive spells at Second Division club Charlton Athletic and Third Division South club Fulham.

== Career statistics ==
Appearances and goals by club, season and competition
Club	Season	League			National Cup		Total	
Club	Season	Division	Apps	Goals	Apps	Goals	Apps	Goals
Airdrieonians	1926–27	Scottish First Division	7	2	0	0	7	2
Airdrieonians	1927–28	Scottish First Division	11	2	0	0	11	2
Airdrieonians	Total		18	4	0	0	18	4
Brentford	1928–29	Third Division South	1	0	0	0	1	0
Career total			19	4	0	0	19	4
