= George Dumbrell =

English footballer

Personal information
- Full name: George Dumbrell
- Date of birth: 23 September 1906
- Place of birth: Catford, England
- Date of death: 1990 (aged 83–84)
- Place of death: Gravesend, England
- Height: 6 ft 0 in (1.83 m)
- Positions: Full back; centre forward

Senior career*
Years	Team	Apps	(Gls)
1923–1924	Botwell Mission		
1924–1925	Nunhead		
1925–1926	Catford Southend		
1926–1927	Cray Wanderers		
1927–1928	Dartford		
1928–1931	Brentford	12	(0)
1931–1933	Leicester City	37	(0)
1933–1935	Bournemouth & Boscombe Athletic	13	(2)
1935–1938	Brentford	5	(0)
- * Club domestic league appearances and goals

George Dumbrell (23 September 1906 – 1990) was an English professional footballer who played as a full back and centre forward in the Football League for Leicester City, Brentford and Bournemouth & Boscombe Athletic.

== Career statistics ==
Appearances and goals by club, season and competition
Club	Season	League			FA Cup		Total	
Club	Season	Division	Apps	Goals	Apps	Goals	Apps	Goals
Brentford	1928–29	Third Division South	3	0	0	0	3	0
Brentford	1929–30	Third Division South	9	0	0	0	9	0
Brentford	Total		12	0	0	0	12	0
Leicester City	1930–31	First Division	4	0	0	0	4	0
Leicester City	1931–32	First Division	18	0	2	0	20	0
Leicester City	1932–33	First Division	14	0	0	0	14	0
Leicester City	1933–34	First Division	1	0	0	0	1	0
Leicester City	Total		37	0	2	0	39	0
Brentford	1935–36	First Division	1	0	0	0	1	0
Brentford	1936–37	First Division	4	0	0	0	4	0
Brentford	Total		17	0	0	0	17	0
Career total			54	0	2	0	56	0
