= James Dodds =

James Dodds may refer to:

- James Dodds (artist) (born 1957), English artist
- James Dodds (diplomat) (1891–1975), British diplomat

== See also ==
- James Dodd (disambiguation)
