= Charles McKinley =

English footballer

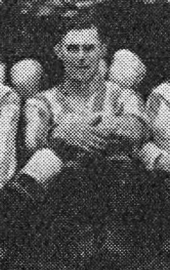
- McKinley while with Brentford in 1928.

Personal information
- Full name: Charles Albert McKinley
- Date of birth: 13 September 1902
- Place of birth: Poplar, England
- Date of death: 20 March 1983 (aged 80)
- Place of death: Plaistow, England
- Position: Outside forward

Senior career*
Years	Team	Apps	(Gls)
- Leyton
- Southall
1927–1928	Charlton Athletic	23	(3)
1928	Leyton		
1928–1929	Brentford	14	(1)
- * Club domestic league appearances and goals

Charles Albert McKinley (13 September 1902 – 20 March 1983) was an English professional footballer who played as an outside forward in the Football League for Charlton Athletic and Brentford. He remained an amateur prior to joining Brentford.

== Career statistics ==
Appearances and goals by club, season and competition
Club	Season	League			FA Cup		Total	
Club	Season	Division	Apps	Goals	Apps	Goals	Apps	Goals
Charlton Athletic	1927–28	Third Division South	23	3	4	0	27	3
Brentford	1928–29	Third Division South	14	1	1	0	15	1
Career total			37	4	5	0	42	4

== Honours ==
Leyton

- FA Amateur Cup: 1927–28
