= David Sherlaw =

Scottish footballer

Personal information
- Full name: David Drummond Sherlaw
- Date of birth: 17 September 1901
- Place of birth: Penicuik, Scotland
- Position: Forward

Youth career
- –1924: Dalkeith Thistle

Senior career*
Years	Team	Apps	(Gls)
1924–1925	Bathgate	25	(3)
1925	St Bernard's	2	(0)
1925–1926	Bristol City	21	(6)
1926–1928	Charlton Athletic	86	(33)
1928–1932	Brentford	34	(10)
1932	St Johnstone	8	(4)
1932–1933	Montrose	17	(8)
1933	Leith Athletic	1	(0)
- * Club domestic league appearances and goals

David Drummond Sherlaw was a Scottish professional footballer who played as a forward in the Football League for Charlton Athletic, Brentford and Bristol City. He also played in the Scottish League for Bathgate, Montrose, St Johnstone, St Bernard's and Leith Athletic.

== Career ==
A forward, Sherlaw began his career at Scottish League Second Division club Bathgate, before moving to England to sign for Third Division South high-flyers Bristol City in May 1925. Six goals and 21 appearances later, he moved to struggling divisional rivals Charlton Athletic in January 1926. Sherlaw again moved within the Third Division South to join Brentford in 1928 and scored 8 goals in 29 appearances during the 1928–29 season. He fell out of first team contention and returned to Scotland to sign for Second Division club St Johnstone in 1932, before finishing his career with Montrose and Leith Athletic.

== Personal life ==
Sherlaw's great-grandson, Andrew Montgomery, won the Crieff Soccer Centre Player of the Year award in 2008, aged seven.

== Career statistics ==
Appearances and goals by club, season and competition
Club	Season	League			National Cup		Total	
Club	Season	Division	Apps	Goals	Apps	Goals	Apps	Goals
Bathgate	1924–25	Scottish Second Division	25	3	1	0	26	3
St Bernard's	1924–25	Scottish Second Division	2	0	—		2	0
Bristol City	1925–26	Third Division South	21	6	0	0	21	6
Brentford	1928–29	Third Division South	27	7	2	1	29	8
Brentford	1930–31	Third Division South	1	1	0	0	1	1
Brentford	1931–32	Third Division South	6	2	0	0	6	2
Brentford	Total		34	10	2	1	36	11
St Johnstone	1932–33	Scottish First Division	8	4	—		8	4
Montrose	1932–33	Scottish Second Division	17	8	2	1	19	9
Leith Athletic	1933–34	Scottish Second Division	1	0	0	0	1	0
Career Total			108	31	5	2	113	33

== Honours ==
Brentford

- London Charity Fund: 1928
