= Albert Purdy =

English footballer

Personal information
- Full name: Albert Purdy
- Date of birth: 15 March 1899
- Place of birth: Edmonton, England
- Date of death: June 1991 (aged 92)
- Place of death: Wandsworth, England
- Position: Wing half

Senior career*
Years	Team	Apps	(Gls)
1920–1921	Tottenham Hotspur	0	(0)
1921–1925	Charlton Athletic	99	(0)
1925–1928	Southend United	43	(1)
1928–1929	Brentford	1	(0)
- Dartford
- * Club domestic league appearances and goals

Albert Purdy (15 March 1899 – June 1991) was an English professional footballer who played as a wing half in the Football League for Charlton Athletic, Southend United and Brentford. While a player with Charlton Athletic, he doubled as the club's groundsman. After his retirement as a player, Purdy became the head groundsman at Fulham and lived in the Craven Cottage.

== Personal life ==
Purdy served as a private in the 1st Surrey Rifles during the First World War and saw action at High Wood on the Somme.

== Career statistics ==
Appearances and goals by club, season and competition
Club	Season	League			FA Cup		Total	
Club	Season	Division	Apps	Goals	Apps	Goals	Apps	Goals
Charlton Athletic	1921–22	Third Division South	18	0	0	0	18	0
Charlton Athletic	1922–23	Third Division South	24	0	0	0	24	0
Charlton Athletic	1923–24	Third Division South	28	0	0	0	28	0
Charlton Athletic	1924–25	Third Division South	30	0	0	0	30	0
Charlton Athletic	Total		99	0	11	0	110	0
Southend United	Total		43	1	3	0	46	1
Brentford	1928–29	Third Division South	1	0	0	0	1	0
Career total			44	1	3	0	47	1
