= James Lockie =

English footballer

James Lockie (4 January 1874 – 1955) was an English footballer active at the turn of the 20th century. He made a total of 7 appearances in The Football League for Newcastle United and Grimsby Town.
