= Brian Payne =

English footballer

Brian Payne (4 November 1937 – 19 August 2013) was an English footballer active in the 1950s. He made 36 appearances in The Football League for Gillingham.
