= Edwin Scott =

English footballer (1917–2007)

Edwin John Scott (21 May 1917 – February 2007) was an English professional footballer. He was born in Portsmouth. He played for Gillingham between 1935 and 1938, making 50 appearances in the Football League. At the time of his death, aged 89, he was the Kent club's oldest living former player. He stood 5 ft 6 in (1.68 m) tall.
