= Paul Vaessen =

English footballer (1961–2001)

Personal information
- Full name: Paul Leon Vaessen
- Date of birth: 16 October 1961
- Place of birth: Gillingham, England
- Date of death: 8 August 2001 (aged 39)
- Place of death: Bristol, England
- Position: Striker

Senior career*
Years	Team	Apps	(Gls)
1978–1982	Arsenal	32	(6)
1983–1984	Fisher Athletic		
- * Club domestic league appearances and goals

Paul Leon Vaessen (16 October 1961 – 8 August 2001) was an English footballer who played as a striker.

== Career ==
Vaessen was born in Gillingham to a footballing family – his father Leon had played for Millwall and Gillingham. A centre-forward, he joined Arsenal in 1977 as an apprentice, and made his debut aged 16 against Lokomotive Leipzig in the UEFA Cup on 27 September 1978. He made his league debut the following year, against Chelsea on 14 May 1979. He turned professional in July the same year, scoring five goals in 13 appearances in 1979–80.

The most famous of these goals was the one Vaessen scored against Juventus at the Stadio Comunale, in the second leg of a 1980 Cup Winners Cup Semi Final on 23 April 1980. Arsenal had drawn the first leg 1–1 and thus, trailing on the away goals rule, needed to score to stand any chance of getting to the final. Arsenal manager Terry Neill sent Vaessen on as a substitute after 75 minutes and he headed home a late goal from a Graham Rix cross in the 88th minute to make the score 2–1 to Arsenal, which put them into the final. It was the first time Juventus had lost to a British team on home soil. Vaessen did not play in the final, which Arsenal lost on penalties to Valencia at Heysel Stadium.

Vaessen's career was blighted by injury; he was unable to play regularly over the next two seasons. He ruptured ligaments in his knee and had to have three operations. He was forced to retire from football in the summer of 1982, before he was 21. In all, he scored 9 goals in 39 matches for Arsenal.

== Later life ==
After leaving Arsenal, Vaessen performed a variety of jobs, such as postman and also worked on a construction site. In 1985, Vaessen almost died from stab wounds suffered when a drug deal went wrong and dealers knifed him in a side street off the Old Kent Road in South East London. Vaessen was stabbed six times, from his armpit to his waist. He lost 4 pints of blood and his heart stopped twice on the operating table.

In 1998, Vaessen was charged with assaulting a policeman after stealing women's tights from a supermarket in Farnborough, Hampshire. His solicitor told magistrates: "This is a very tragic case. Twenty years ago, my client was on top of the world with everything to look forward to. But, at 21, he was told by doctors he would be crippled if he played professional football again. His whole life was turned upside down and he was totally desperate."

== Death ==
In August 2001, Vaessen was found dead in the bathroom of his Bristol flat, aged 39. A post mortem found he had a high level of drugs in his bloodstream and the coroner recorded a verdict of accidental death. It was later revealed that Vaessen had been a heroin addict for several years and had several convictions for crimes including robberies and muggings.
