= John Smith (1930s Gillingham footballer) =

English footballer

John Smith was a professional footballer. He began his career with Exeter City in 1935 but failed to break into the club's first team and moved to non-league club Maidstone United. In May 1937 he joined another Kent-based club, Gillingham, and played 14 times in the Football League during the 1937–38 season. Gillingham left the Football League at the end of his first season with the club, but Smith remained with the club for a further season, playing in the Southern League until the outbreak of the Second World War.
