= Albert Richards (footballer) =

English footballer

Personal information
- Full name: Albert Charles Richards
- Date of birth: 18 July 1903
- Place of birth: Chatham, England
- Date of death: 1973 (aged 69–70)
- Positions: Centre forward; outside right

Senior career*
Years	Team	Apps	(Gls)
- Chatham Town
1923–1924	Charlton Athletic	20	(3)
1924	Luton Town	2	(0)
- Chatham Town
1925–1926	Gillingham	25	(4)
1926–1928	Chatham Town		
1928–1929	Brentford	2	(0)
- Dartford
- * Club domestic league appearances and goals

Albert Charles Richards (18 July 1903 – 1973) was an English professional footballer who played as a centre forward and outside right in the Football League for Gillingham and Brentford. He had a particular affiliation with hometown Kent League club Chatham Town, whom he served in three spells.

== Career statistics ==
Appearances and goals by club, season and competition
Club	Season	League			FA Cup		Total	
Club	Season	Division	Apps	Goals	Apps	Goals	Apps	Goals
Luton Town	1924–25	Third Division South	2	0	0	0	2	0
Gillingham	1925–26	Third Division South	25	4	0	0	25	4
Brentford	1928–29	Third Division South	2	0	0	0	2	0
Career total			29	4	0	0	29	4
