= Fred Ellis (footballer) =

English footballer

Personal information
- Full name: Frederick Charles Ellis
- Date of birth: 7 October 1900
- Place of birth: Sheppey, England
- Date of death: unknown date, 1970
- Place of death: Sheppey, England
- Position: Half-back

Senior career*
Years	Team	Apps	(Gls)
?–1925	Sheppey United		
1925–1931	Gillingham	108	(1)
1931–1932	Watford	32	(1)
1932–1933	Clapton Orient	27	(1)
1933–?	Ashford Town (Kent)		
- * Club domestic league appearances and goals

Frederick Charles Ellis (7 October 1900, – 1970) was an English footballer.

He was born in Sheppey, and played professionally for clubs including Watford and Gillingham, for whom he made over 100 Football League appearances. He subsequently played for Clapton Orient from where he moved on to Kent League club Ashford Town.
