= George Pateman =

English footballer

Personal information
- Full name: George Edward Pateman
- Date of birth: 8 May 1910
- Place of birth: Chatham, England
- Date of death: 1973 (aged 62–63)
- Position: Centre forward

Senior career*
Years	Team	Apps	(Gls)
- Aveling & Porters
- Canterbury Waverley
	Gillingham	17	(5)
1931	Portsmouth	2	(0)
	Oldham Athletic	7	(4)
1934–1935	Bradford City	1	(0)
	Clapton Orient	9	(1)
	Reading	0	(0)
	Accrington Stanley	21	(8)
1937	Southport	13	(4)
	Barrow	17	(1)
- Shorts Sports
- * Club domestic league appearances and goals

George Edward Pateman (8 May 1910 – 1973) was an English professional footballer who played as a centre forward. He made 87 appearances in the Football League spread over eight clubs.

== Career ==
Born in Chatham, Pateman spent his early career with Aveling & Porters, Canterbury Waverley, Gillingham, Portsmouth and Oldham Athletic. At Portsmouth he made two league appearances in October 1931. He moved from Oldham to Bradford City in June 1934, making one league appearance for the club, before moving to Clapton Orient in July 1935. He later played for Reading, Accrington Stanley, Southport, Barrow and Shorts Sports. At Southport he scored four goals in thirteen league appearances between February and April 1937.

== Sources ==
- Frost, Terry (1988). Bradford City A Complete Record 1903–1988. Breedon Books Sport. ISBN 0-907969-38-0.
