= Fred Cheesmur =

English footballer (1908–1987)

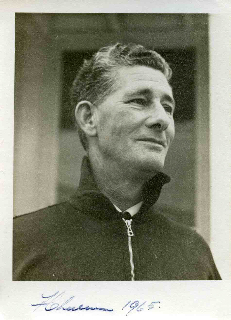
- Cheesmur in 1965

Personal information
- Full name: Frederick Harold Cheesmur
- Date of birth: 16 January 1908
- Place of birth: Wandsworth, England
- Date of death: 13 August 1987 (aged 79)
- Place of death: Folkestone, England
- Position: Inside forward

Senior career*
Years	Team	Apps	(Gls)
?–1927	Dartford		
1927–1928	Arsenal	0	(0)
1928–1929	Charlton Athletic	0	(0)
1929–1930	Gillingham	55	(19)
1930–1934	Sheffield United	17	(2)
1934–1936	Southend United	31	(8)
1936–?	Folkestone		
- * Club domestic league appearances and goals as of 15 August 2007

Frederick Harold Cheesmur (born Wandsworth, 16 January 1908, died Folkestone, 13 August 1987) was an English professional footballer.

Cheesmur's clubs included Charlton Athletic, Gillingham and Sheffield United. While playing for Gillingham in a match against Merthyr Town on 26 April 1930, he scored six goals, a club record haul for a single match at a professional level which stands to this day.
