= Stanley Amos =

English footballer

Stanley Thomas Amos (18 September 1907 – 1991) was an English professional footballer of the 1920s. Born in Cradley Heath, Staffordshire, he joined Gillingham from Cradley Heath St Luke's in 1926 and went on to make 31 appearances for the club in The Football League, scoring 13 goals. He left to return to his former club in 1928.

He died in Wolverhampton in 1991.
