= Reg McKee =

English footballer

Reginald McKee (born 1900, date of death unknown) was an English footballer active in the 1920s. He made a total of 40 appearances in The Football League for Gillingham and Charlton Athletic.
