= Syd Hartley =

English footballer

Sydney Hartley (22 January 1914 – May 1987) was an English professional footballer. He joined Huddersfield Town in 1932 before moving to Grimsby Town the next season. He went on to play for Tunbridge Wells Rangers, Burnley and Clapton Orient before returning to Tunbridge Wells Rangers in 1936. He then played for Gillingham and Bristol Rovers between 1936 and 1939, ending his career with non-league Barrow.

After retiring from football he trained as a butcher in Barrow, became a post master in Pudsey and later became the licensee of the Horse & Jockey public house in Birstall (1969 to 1979).

He stood 5 ft 9 in (1.75 m) tall.
