= Peter Smith (English footballer, born 1935) =

English footballer (1935–2019)

Peter John Smith (27 May 1935 – October 2019) was an English professional footballer. He played professionally for Gillingham between 1958 and 1960, and in total made 39 appearances in the English Football League, scoring two goals. Smith died in Surrey in October 2019, at the age of 84.
