= Frederick Smith (footballer) =

English footballer

Fred Smith
Personal information
- Full name: Frederick Smith
- Place of birth: Oldham, England
- Height: 5 ft 8 in (1.73 m)
- Position: Outside right

Youth career
- Chadderton

Senior career*
Years	Team	Apps	(Gls)
1930–1931	Hurst	45	(25)
1931–1932	Stockport County	17	(1)
1932–1933	Ashton National		
1933–1935	Hurst	46	(16)
1935–1936	Darlington	27	(8)
1936–1937	Exeter City	24	(4)
1937–1938	Gillingham	15	(2)
- * Club domestic league appearances and goals

Frederick Smith was an English footballer.

He was born in Oldham, Lancashire, and played League football for Stockport County, Darlington, Exeter City and Gillingham.
