= Cyril Walker (footballer) =

English footballer and manager

Personal information
- Full name: Cyril John Walker
- Date of birth: 24 February 1914
- Place of birth: Newport Pagnell, England
- Date of death: July 2002 (aged 88)
- Place of death: Chatham, England
- Height: 5 ft 10 1/2 in (1.79 m)
- Position: Inside forward

Senior career*
Years	Team	Apps	(Gls)
- Hitchin Town
- Leavesden Mental Hospital
1935–1937	Watford	0	(0)
1937	Gillingham	10	(3)
1937–1938	Sheffield Wednesday	4	(0)
- Chelmsford City
- Shorts Sports
1946–1947	Norwich City	3	(2)
- Snowdown Colliery Welfare
1951–1952	Margate		
- Dartford
- Chatham Town

Managerial career
- Beckenham Town
- Ware
- * Club domestic league appearances and goals

Cyril John Walker (24 February 1914 – July 2002) was an English professional football player and manager.

== Career ==
Born in Newport Pagnell, Walker started his football career as a striker in Hertfordshire, with Hitchin Town and Leavesden Mental Hospital. He joined Watford as a professional in 1935, but after failing to play a competitive game, joined Gillingham at the end of the 1936–37 season. His time at Gillingham was brief; after scoring 4 goals in 11 competitive games, he moved clubs again in October 1937, this time to Sheffield Wednesday. He spent most of the rest of his career in English wartime or non-league football, but had a brief spell at Norwich City in 1946–47, before finishing his playing days at Snowdown Colliery Welfare, Dartford, Chatham Town and Margate. Following his playing career, Walker served as manager for Beckenham and in 1955/6 for Ware.
