= Jimmy Dodd (rugby union) =

English rugby union player

- Full name: James Dodd
- Born: Kirkby Lonsdale, England

Rugby union career
- Position: Centre
Senior career
Years	Team	Apps	(Points)
1876-93	Halifax	327	
	Yorkshire	31	

James Dodd was an English rugby union footballer who played in the 1870s, 1880s and 1890s. He played at representative level for Yorkshire, and at club level for Halifax, as a centre. Prior to Tuesday 27 August 1895, Halifax was a rugby union club.

== Background ==
Jimmy Dodd was born in Kirkby Lonsdale, Westmorland, England.

== Playing career ==
Dodd won caps for Yorkshire while at Halifax. He made his début for Halifax on Saturday 7 October 1876, and he played his last match for Halifax on Saturday 22 April 1893.

== Honoured at Halifax RLFC ==
Jimmy Dodd is a Halifax RLFC Hall of Fame inductee.
