= Alan Ure =

English football manager (1892–1970)

Personal information
- Full name: Allan Richard Ure
- Date of birth: 12 January 1892
- Date of death: 1970 (aged 77–78)

Managerial career
- Years: Team
- 1937–1938: Gillingham

Allan Richard Ure (12 January 1892 – 1970) was an English football manager. He managed Gillingham for the 1937–38 season, which saw the club finish bottom of the Football League Third Division South and fail to gain re-election. This was his only known managerial appointment, and there is no record of his having played football at a professional level.

== Career ==
Ure was trainer at Blackpool and Leeds United before becoming trainer at Gillingham. After leaving Gillingham, he became the trainer at Millwall. By 1956, he was trainer at Halifax Town. He still held the post in January 1962 when he was reportedly the oldest club trainer in the Football League.

== Personal life ==
Ure was the son-in-law of manager Bill Norman.
