= Fred Castle (footballer) =

Welsh footballer

Personal information
- Full name: Frederick Richard Castle
- Date of birth: 10 April 1902
- Place of birth: Penygraig, Wales
- Position: Forward

Senior career*
Years	Team	Apps	(Gls)
- Mid Rhondda
1926–1928	Cardiff City	3	(0)
1928–1929	Chesterfield		
1929–1930	Gillingham		
- Mid Rhondda
- Derry City
- Doncaster Rovers
- * Club domestic league appearances and goals

Frederick Richard Castle (10 April 1902 – after 1930) was a Welsh professional footballer who played as a forward.

== Career ==
After playing for local Welsh sides and Mid Rhondda, Castle made his professional debut for Cardiff City on Christmas Day 1926 in a 5–0 defeat to Newcastle United. He later played for Chesterfield and Gillingham before moving back into non-league football.
