= Albert Collins (footballer) =

English footballer

Personal information
- Date of birth: 16 January 1899
- Place of birth: Sheerness, England
- Date of death: 1 December 1969 (aged 70)
- Place of death: Gillingham, England
- Position: Centre half

Senior career*
Years	Team	Apps	(Gls)
1923–1929	Millwall	24	(3)
1929–1934	Gillingham	170	(4)
1934–1935	Tunbridge Wells Rangers		
–	Canterbury Waverley		
- * Club domestic league appearances and goals

Albert John Collins (16 January 1899 – 1 December 1969) was an English footballer who played professionally for clubs including Millwall and Gillingham. He made 170 Football League appearances for the latter club. On leaving Gillingham he went into non-League football, first with Tunbridge Wells Rangers and finally with Canterbury Waverley.
