= Tug Wilson (footballer) =

English footballer

Thomas Harold "Tug" Wilson (23 November 1917 – 1959) was an English professional footballer. He played for Gillingham between 1936 and 1949.
