= George Bishop (footballer) =

Welsh football player

Personal information
- Full name: George Arthur Bishop
- Date of birth: 1901
- Place of birth: Tredegar, Wales
- Position: Half back

Senior career*
Years	Team	Apps	(Gls)
1925–1926	Rochdale	0	(0)
1926–1929	Merthyr Town	109	(3)
1929–1932	Gillingham	94	(0)
1932–1933	Southampton	0	(0)
1933–19??	Ebbw Vale		
- * Club domestic league appearances and goals

George Arthur Bishop (born 1901) was a Welsh footballer. He played professionally for Gillingham and Merthyr Town between 1926 and 1932.
