= Jimmy Watson (footballer, born 1914) =

English footballer

Personal information
- Full name: William James Boyd Watson
- Date of birth: 1 January 1914
- Place of birth: Durham, England
- Date of death: 1979 (aged 64–65)
- Place of death: Bristol, England
- Position: Inside forward

Senior career*
Years	Team	Apps	(Gls)
–	St Anthony's		
1932–1933	Tunbridge Wells Rangers		
1933–1934	Bristol Rovers	14	(2)
1934–1935	Northampton Town	7	(3)
1935–1938	Gillingham	110	(38)
1938–1939	Notts County	17	(4)
1939	Bristol Rovers	0	(0)
1945–1946	Brighton & Hove Albion	0	(0)
- * Club domestic league appearances and goals

William James Boyd Watson (1 January 1914 – 1979) (Note: Joyce (2012, p. 303) records Watson's birth date as 14 April 1910 and Litster (2012, chpt. W) records 14 August 1910. Both have the birthplace as Govan, Scotland, and his death as 1978. Litster records his death as being in Tunbridge Wells.) was an English footballer who played professionally for clubs including Northampton Town, Notts County and Gillingham, for whom he made over 100 Football League appearances.
