= Tom Nekrews =

English footballer (1933–2019)

Personal information
- Full name: Thomas John Nekrews
- Date of birth: 20 March 1933
- Place of birth: Chatham, England
- Date of death: 30 October 2019 (aged 86)
- Place of death: Perth, Australia
- Position: Centre-half

Senior career*
Years	Team	Apps	(Gls)
–1953	Chelsea	0	(0)
1953–1958	Gillingham	42	(0)
1958–????	Watford	0	(0)
- * Club domestic league appearances and goals

Thomas John Nekrews (20 March 1933 - 30 October 2019) was an English professional footballer who played as a centre-half. After an unsuccessful spell with Chelsea he went on to play professionally for Gillingham between 1953 and 1958, and in total made 42 appearances in the Football League. He joined Watford in July 1958, but made no League appearances.
