= Campbell Whyte =

Scottish footballer

Campbell Whyte was a Scottish footballer of the 1920s and 1930s. He played in Scotland for Cowdenbeath and Third Lanark and in England for Gillingham, Northampton Town and Rochdale. He made 29 Football League appearances.
