= Robert Robinson (footballer) =

English footballer (1906–1990)

Robert John C. Robinson (9 November 1906 – 1990) was an English professional footballer. He played for Gillingham in the 1929–30 season.
