= Dave Whitelaw =

Scottish footballer

Personal information
- Full name: David Logan Whitelaw
- Date of birth: 9 August 1909
- Place of birth: Glasgow, Scotland
- Date of death: 27 February 1979 (aged 69)
- Place of death: Oxford, England
- Height: 6 ft 0 in (1.83 m)
- Position: Goalkeeper

Senior career*
Years	Team	Apps	(Gls)
1931	Bristol City	12	(0)
1931–1935	Southend United	92	(0)
1935–1938	Gillingham	114	(0)
1945	Wrexham	0	(0)
- * Club domestic league appearances and goals

David Logan Whitelaw (9 August 1909 – 27 February 1979) was a Scottish footballer who played professionally for clubs including Southend United and Gillingham, for whom he made over 100 Football League appearances.

Whitelaw guested for clubs including Bournemouth & Boscombe Athletic, Chester and Wrexham during World War II.
