= Albert Brallisford =

English footballer

Personal information
- Date of birth: 9 October 1911
- Place of birth: Belle Vue, County Durham, England
- Date of death: 1991 (aged 79–80)
- Height: 5 ft 8 in (1.73 m)
- Position: Centre forward

Senior career*
Years	Team	Apps	(Gls)
- West Hartlepool Perseverance
- Trimdon Grange Colliery
1932	Southport	1	(1)
1933–1935	Blackpool	17	(8)
1936–1937	Darlington	39	(26)
1937	Gillingham	14	(3)
- Glentoran
- Blackhall Colliery Welfare
- * Club domestic league appearances and goals

Albert Brallisford (9 October 1911 – 1991) was an English professional footballer. A centre forward, he played for several Football League clubs in the 1930s.

== Career ==
After beginning in local football with West Hartlepool Perseverance and Trimdon Grange Colliery, Brallisford joined Southport in 1932. After one League game, in which he scored for the Sandgrounders, he moved up the coast and joined Blackpool. He played seventeen League games for the Bloomfield Road club, finding the net on eight occasions.

In 1936 he signed for Darlington, for whom he scored 26 goals in 39 League outings. After one season, however, he left to join Gillingham in 1937. He made fourteen League appearances for the "Gills", scoring three goals.

He spent a brief spell in Northern Ireland with Glentoran, before retiring with Blackhall Colliery Welfare.
