= Bobby Folds =

English footballer (born 1949)

Personal information
- Full name: Robert James Folds
- Date of birth: 18 April 1949 (age 77)
- Place of birth: Bedford, England
- Position: Left-back

Youth career
- Bedford Town

Senior career*
Years	Team	Apps	(Gls)
1968–1971	Gillingham	44	(1)
1968	→ Hastings United (loan)		
1971–1972	Northampton Town	29	(0)
1972	Telford United		
1972–1980	Bedford Town		
- Hitchin Town
- Buckingham Town
- Kempston Rovers

Managerial career
- 1986–1990: Kempston Rovers
- * Club domestic league appearances and goals

Robert James Folds (born 18 April 1949) is an English former footballer, who had a short and injury-affected professional career but played at a semi-professional level for nearly twenty years.

== Career ==
Born in Bedford, he joined local club Bedford Town of the Southern Football League while still at school. Bedford manager Basil Hayward took over as manager of Gillingham of the Football League Third Division in 1966 and recruited a number of players from his former club, including Folds, who joined the "Gills" as the club's first ever apprentice-professional.

In March 1967, shortly before he became a full-time professional, Folds broke his leg playing for Gillingham's reserve team against Chelsea and missed eight months of action. In January 1968 he was loaned to Hastings United in a bid to regain match fitness. He eventually made his first team debut in a match away to Barnsley at the start of the 1968–69 season, but played irregularly for the first team, amassing only 44 Football League appearances in four seasons. His only goal for the "Gills" came against Brighton & Hove Albion in September 1969. Nonetheless, his ability to operate in many different positions on the field of play was considered important to the squad. In August 1971 he was released from his contract at Priestfield Stadium and joined Northampton Town of the Fourth Division. After just one season with the club, however, he dropped back into non-league football with Telford United. He rejoined Bedford Town in October 1972 and played for the club for eight years. His later clubs included Hitchin Town and Buckingham Town. In 1985, he joined Kempston Rovers, where he remained well into the 1990s, going on to serve as the club's assistant manager and manager, holding the latter position between 1986 and 1990.
