= Leonard Dowell =

Scottish footballer

Len Dowell
Personal information
- Date of birth: 13 June 1902
- Place of birth: Edinburgh, Scotland
- Date of death: 15 June 1966 (aged 64)
- Place of death: Edinburgh, Scotland
- Height: 5 ft 8 in (1.73 m)
- Position: Inside forward

Senior career*
Years	Team	Apps	(Gls)
1921–1923	Newtongrange Star		
1923–1924	Portobello Thistle		
1924–1925	Partick Thistle	1	(0)
1925–1927	Sittingbourne		
1927–1931	Gillingham	55	(7)
1931–1932	Ashford		
1932–1933	LLoyds		
- * Club domestic league appearances and goals

Leonard Dowell (13 June 1902 – 15 June 1966) was a Scottish professional footballer who played as an Inside forward. He played in the Scottish Football League for Partick Thistle and in the English Football League for Gillingham.

== Career ==
Between 1921 and 1924 Dowell played for two Scottish Junior teams: Newtongrange Star for two seasons in both of which they were league champions – firstly of the Midlothian Junior League and then its replacement the East of Scotland Junior League – followed by a season in the latter league with Portobello Thistle.

In August 1924 he signed with senior level Scottish First Division club Partick Thistle. During the following 1924–1925 season he appeared in only one league game for 'The Jags' and at the end of the season he was not retained and moved to England joining Sittingbourne of the Kent League.

Dowell remained at Sittingbourne for two season before in 1927 signing for Football League Third Division South club Gillingham. During his four seasons, 1927–28 to 1930–31, with 'The Gills' he played in 55 games scoring seven goals – all his goals were scored over 22 appearances in the 1929–30 season.

On leaving Gillingham Dowell reverted to playing Kent League football: firstly in the 1931–32 campaign with that season's league runners-up Ashford and then, after relinquishing his professional status, for the following season as an amateur player with LLoyds.

In August 1937 he played in a pre-season trial match at Berwick Rangers.
