= Paul Lucas (footballer) =

English footballer (1936–1992)

Paul Lucas (27 April 1936 – July 1992) was an English professional footballer. After an unsuccessful spell with Aston Villa he went on to play professionally for Gillingham between 1956 and 1958, and in total made 44 appearances in the Football League, scoring seven goals.
