= Reginald Neal (footballer) =

English footballer

Reginald George Neal (1914 – unknown) was an English professional footballer. After being on the books of hometown club Blackpool, he went on to play for Liverpool and Southport, all without making a first-team appearance. He finally made his Football League debut with Bristol City in the 1936–37 season. The following season he joined Gillingham and made a further fourteen League appearances, scoring two goals. There is no record of him playing after the Second World War. He was 5 ft 10 in (1.78 m) tall.
