= Andy Durnion =

Scottish footballer

- Durnion while with Brentford in 1928.

Personal information
- Full name: Andrew John Durnion
- Date of birth: 18 February 1907
- Place of birth: Hamilton, Scotland
- Date of death: 1985 (aged 77–78)
- Position: Forward

Youth career
- St Vincent's
- Glenboig

Senior career*
Years	Team	Apps	(Gls)
- St Joseph's
1928–1929	Brentford	2	(1)
1929–1930	Gillingham	19	(9)
	Thames	2	
- * Club domestic league appearances and goals

Andrew John Durnion (18 February 1907 – 1985) was a Scottish professional football forward who played in the Football League for Gillingham, Brentford and Thames.

== Career statistics ==
Club	Season	League			FA Cup		Total	
Club	Season	Division	Apps	Goals	Apps	Goals	Apps	Goals
Brentford	1928–29	Third Division South	2	1	0	0	2	1
Gillingham	1929–30	Third Division South	19	9	1	0	20	9
Career total			21	10	1	0	22	10
