= Thomas Brennan (footballer) =

Scottish footballer

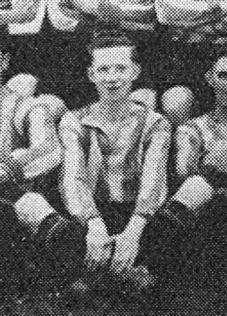
- Brennan while with Brentford in 1928.

Personal information
- Full name: Thomas James Brennan
- Date of birth: 7 February 1911
- Place of birth: Calderbank, Scotland
- Height: 5 ft 7 in (1.70 m)
- Position: Inside forward

Senior career*
Years	Team	Apps	(Gls)
–1928	Longriggend Rob Roy		
1928–1929	Brentford	0	(0)
1929–1930	Gillingham	16	(2)
1930–1931	Crystal Palace	2	(0)
1932	East Stirlingshire	3	(0)
1932	Leith Athletic		
1932–1933	Tunbridge Wells Rangers		
1933–1934	Blackburn Rovers	13	(1)
1935–1936	Stockport County	10	(2)
- * Club domestic league appearances and goals

Thomas James Brennan was a Scottish professional footballer who played in the Football League for Gillingham, Blackburn Rovers, Stockport County and Crystal Palace as an inside forward. He also played in the Scottish League for East Stirlingshire.

== Career statistics ==
Appearances and goals by club, season and competition
Club	Season	League			National cup (Note: Includes Scottish Cup, FA Cup)		Total	
Club	Season	Division	Apps	Goals	Apps	Goals	Apps	Goals
Gillingham	1929–30	Third Division South	7	1	0	0	7	1
Gillingham	1930–31	Third Division South	9	1	0	0	9	1
Gillingham	Total		16	2	0	0	16	2
Crystal Palace	1930–31	Third Division South	2	0	0	0	2	0
East Stirlingshire	1931–32	Scottish Second Division	3	0	―		3	0
Blackburn Rovers	1933–34	First Division	8	1	0	0	8	1
Blackburn Rovers	1934–35	First Division	5	0	0	0	5	0
Blackburn Rovers	Total		13	1	0	0	13	1
Stockport County	1935–36	Third Division North	10	2	0	0	10	2
Career total			44	5	0	0	44	5
