= George Ballsom =

Welsh footballer

Personal information
- Full name: William George Ballsom
- Date of birth: 30 October 1912
- Place of birth: Trealaw, Wales
- Date of death: 1983 (aged 70–71)
- Place of death: England
- Height: 6 ft 1 in (1.85 m)
- Position: Right back

Senior career*
Years	Team	Apps	(Gls)
1934–1935	Tunbridge Wells Rangers		
1935–1938	Gillingham	45	(0)
1938–1939	Cardiff City	34	(0)
- * Club domestic league appearances and goals

William George Ballsom (1912 – 1983) was a Welsh professional footballer of the 1930s. He made 79 appearances in The Football League during spells with Gillingham and Cardiff City.

== Career ==
Born on 30 October 1912 in Trealaw, Ballsom joined Gillingham in 1935 from Tunbridge Wells Rangers and went on to make 45 appearances for the club in the English Football League. When the club was voted out of the league in 1938, however, he returned to his native Wales and signed for Cardiff City. Replacing Arthur Granville, Ballsom played in 34 league games for the club during the 1938–39 season and was retained for the following year but the outbreak of World War II meant he did not feature for the club again.
