= Leon Vaessen =

English footballer

Personal information
- Full name: Leon Henry Vaessen
- Date of birth: 8 November 1940 (age 85)
- Place of birth: New Cross, England
- Position: Half-back

Youth career
- ?–1958: Chelsea

Senior career*
Years	Team	Apps	(Gls)
1958–1961	Millwall	26	(2)
1961–1963	Gillingham	29	(0)
1963–1965	Dover		
1965–?	Crawley Town		
- * Club domestic league appearances and goals

Leon Henry Vaessen (born 8 November 1940) was an English professional footballer of the 1950s and 1960s. He made over 50 appearances in The Football League.

== Playing career ==
Born in New Cross, he joined Chelsea as a youngster, but was not offered a professional contract. In January 1958 he signed for Millwall and went on to make 26 Football League appearances for the "Lions", but never established himself as a regular starter. At the end of the 1960–61 season, he was transferred to Gillingham. He was initially a regular in the team, but fell out of favour, playing just once in the 1962–63 season, before being sold to Dover for a fee of £500. His last known club was Crawley Town.

== Family ==
His mother was English and his father was Dutch. His son Paul played for Arsenal but was forced to retire due to injury and fell into a life of crime and drug addiction before dying at the age of 39 in 2001.
