= William Jones (English footballer, fl. 1930s) =

English footballer

William George Jones was an English professional footballer of the 1930s. He played in either wing half position, or at outside right.

Born in Chatham, Kent, Jones joined Gillingham in 1929 from hometown club Chatham Town and went on to make 46 appearances for the club in The Football League. He left in 1932 and joined Sittingbourne.
