= Jimmy Dodds =

Northern Irish footballer

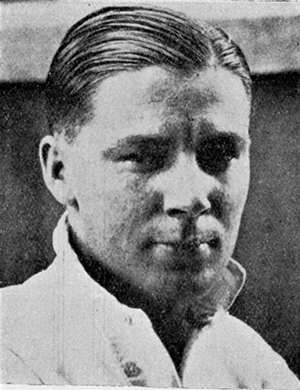

Personal information
- Full name: James Angus Dodds
- Date of birth: 7 September 1914
- Place of birth: Belfast, Ireland
- Date of death: 26 January 1942 (aged 27)
- Place of death: Singapore
- Height: 5 ft 8 1/2 in (1.74 m)
- Position: Winger

Senior career*
Years	Team	Apps	(Gls)
1933	Model		
1934	Linfield		
1935–1936	Fulham	1	(0)
1936–1937	Gillingham	26	(7)
1937	Glentoran		
1938	Worcester City		
1939	Kidderminster Harriers		
- * Club domestic league appearances and goals

James Angus Dodds (7 September 1914 – 26 January 1942) was a Northern Irish professional footballer who played as a winger in the Football League for Fulham and Gillingham.

== Personal life ==
Dodds served as a flight sergeant in the Royal Air Force Volunteer Reserve during the Second World War. He was mentioned in despatches twice during his service. Dodds was killed on 26 January 1942 aboard Lockheed Hudson AE602 when it was shot down by Japanese Ki-27 fighters during the Battle of Singapore. The bomber had been returning to base after conducting a raid on Japanese ships landing at Endau. Dodds is commemorated on the Kranji War Memorial.

== Career statistics ==
Appearances and goals by club, season and competition
Club	Season	Division	League		Other		Total	
Club	Season	Division	Apps	Goals	Apps	Goals	Apps	Goals
Fulham	1935–36	Second Division	1	0	0	0	1	0
Gillingham	1936–37	Third Division North	25	6	1	1	26	7
Career total			50	2	1	0	51	2
