= Patrick Bradley (footballer) =

Scottish footballer (born 1901)

Personal information
- Full name: Patrick John Bradley
- Date of birth: 23 April 1902
- Place of birth: Coatbridge, Scotland
- Position: Outside forward

Senior career*
Years	Team	Apps	(Gls)
1924–1926	Wolverhampton Wanderers	5	(0)
1926–1927	Gillingham	33	(3)
1927–?	Walsall Wood		
- Brownhills Albion
- * Club domestic league appearances and goals

Patrick John Bradley (born 23 April 1902) was a Scottish professional football player of the 1920s. Born in Coatbridge, his earliest known club was Wolverhampton Wanderers. He made only five appearances for the club in the Football League Second Division before moving to Gillingham of the Third Division South in November 1926. He was a regular in the Gills' first team for the remainder of the 1926–27 season, playing 24 games and scoring three goals, including two in a 4–4 draw with Swindon Town.

The following season, however, he lost his place to new signing Enos Bromage and, despite, returning for a run of nine consecutive first team games in October and November, he never made another Football League appearance for Gillingham and moved on to non-league club Walsall Wood. He later played for another minor club in the same area, Brownhills Albion.
