= Jimmy Dodd (footballer) =

English footballer

Personal information
- Full name: James Edward Dodd
- Date of birth: 12 December 1933
- Place of birth: Wallasey, England
- Date of death: December 2017 (aged 83–84)
- Place of death: Cheshire, England
- Position: Forward

Senior career*
Years	Team	Apps	(Gls)
1956–1960	Tranmere Rovers	63	(22)
- * Club domestic league appearances and goals

James Edward Dodd (12 December 1933 – December 2017) was an English footballer, who played as a forward in the Football League for Tranmere Rovers.
