= Joe Wilson (1920s and 1930s footballer) =

English footballer

Joseph Wilson was an English professional footballer. Born in Spennymoor, he joined Gillingham in 1928 and went on to make 19 appearances for the club in The Football League. He left in 1930 to join Walsall.
