= Arthur Fowler (footballer) =

English footballer

Arthur Joseph Fowler (20 November 1911 - 2001) was an English footballer active in the 1930s. He made 28 appearances in The Football League for Gillingham. He stood 5 ft 8 in (1.73 m) tall.
