= Jack Rutherford (footballer, born 1908) =

English footballer

John Rutherford (born 6 November 1908) was an English professional footballer of the 1920s and 1930s. Born in Nenthead, he joined Gillingham in 1927 and went on to make 44 appearances for the club in The Football League. He left to join Watford in 1931.
