= Jim Bartley (footballer) =

English footballer

James William Edward Bartley (baptised 28 May 1902 – 21 September 1939) was an English professional footballer of the 1920s.

Bartley was born in Coseley, Staffordshire, the son of George and Eliza Bartley. In 1916, during the First World War, his father died in Mesopotamia of wounds received while serving with the North Staffordshire (Prince of Wales's) Regiment. Bartley joined Gillingham from Bilston United in 1926. He made his debut for the club in September of the same year against Aberdare Athletic and played in the next three matches, but was then out of the team for six months. He returned to the team in April 1927 against Exeter City and played five more times that season, but played only once in 1927–28 and twice in 1928–29.

Bartley had a further run of eight games in the Gillingham team in September and October 1929, but after two further games later that season, he left to join Canterbury Waverley.

Bartley later ran a pub, the Good Intent, in Gillingham. In September 1939, "after a period of indifferent health", he died unexpectedly at age 37, the same age at which his father died. He was survived by a widow and two children.
