= 1920–21 Gillingham F.C. season =

English football club season

Gillingham
1920–21 season
- Chairman: E. N. Crawley
- Manager: John McMillan
- Third Division: 22nd
- FA Cup: Sixth qualifying round
- Top goalscorer: League: Tommy Hall (9); All: Tommy Hall (11)
- Highest home attendance: Approx. 12,000 vs Southampton (28 August 1920) and vs Millwall (30 October 1920)
- Lowest home attendance: Approx. 5,000 vs Portsmouth (15 September 1920)
Home colours

During the 1920–21 English football season, Gillingham F.C. competed in the Football League for the first time. The team had previously played in Division One of the Southern League, but in 1920 the Football League added the Third Division to its existing set-up by absorbing the entire Southern League Division One. The club appointed Robert Brown as manager, but the arrangement turned out to be only a casual one and he accepted another job before the season started. Under his replacement, John McMillan, Gillingham's results were poor, including a spell of over three months without a league victory, and at the end of the season they finished bottom of the league table.

Gillingham also competed in the FA Cup, being eliminated in the sixth qualifying round. The team played 45 competitive matches, winning 10, drawing 12 and losing 23. Tommy Hall was the team's top goalscorer; he scored nine goals in league matches and two in the FA Cup. He was one of three players who tied for the most appearances made during the season: Hall, Jack Branfield and Jock Robertson each missed only one game. The highest attendance recorded at the club's home ground, Priestfield Road, was approximately 12,000 for league games against Southampton on 28 August and Millwall on 30 October.

== Background and pre-season ==
Gillingham, founded in 1893, had played in the Southern League since the competition's formation in 1894, apart from when the league was suspended due to the First World War, but had achieved minimal success and had finished bottom of Division One in the 1919–20 season. At the annual general meeting (AGM) of the national Football League on 31 May 1920, the clubs in the existing two divisions voted to admit those in the Southern League's top division en masse to form the new Third Division. Initially it was unclear if Gillingham, by virtue of their last-place finish, would be relegated to the Southern League Division Two before this took effect and thus miss out on a place in the Football League; at the club's own AGM on 3 June angry supporters demanded to know what the club's status would be for the coming season but the board of directors was unable to give an answer. Shortly afterwards it was confirmed that Gillingham would indeed be entering the Football League.

On 12 May, the club appointed Robert Brown as the club's new manager, replacing George Collins. At the time, the impression was given that Brown had been appointed on a permanent basis, but at the AGM the directors admitted that he was only working on a temporary basis, although they hoped to persuade him to stay. Less than a week later, he resigned to take the manager's position at Sheffield Wednesday, leaving Gillingham without ever taking charge of a match. He was replaced by John McMillan, who was paid a wage of £7 (equivalent to £355 in 2023) per week, and who was assisted by Jim Kennedy as trainer.

In preparation for the new season the club signed Wally Battiste from Grimsby Town, Tommy Hall from Newcastle United, Tom Thompson from Sunderland, Tom Gilbey from Darlington, Tom Baxter from Chelsea, Tom Sisson from Hucknall Byron, Clive Wigmore from Aston Villa, George Needham from Derby County, Andy Holt from Chesterfield Municipal and Archie Roe from Birmingham. Hall was signed for a transfer fee of over £1,000 (equivalent to £50,700 in 2023), the first time that Gillingham had paid a four-figure sum to sign a player. Only 6 out of the 39 players who had represented the club in the final Southern League season went on to make appearances in the Football League: Jock Robertson, Jack Branfield, Syd Gore, Joseph Griffiths, Donald McCormick and Arthur Wood, and of these only Robertson, Branfield and Wood remained regular starters. The team wore their usual black and white-striped shirts with white shorts and black socks.

== Third Division ==
=== August–December ===
A cartoon printed in the Chatham Observer newspaper after the team's first game of the season

The club's first Football League match was against Southampton at Gillingham's home ground, Priestfield Road; Sisson, Battiste, Baxter, Wigmore, Holt, Hall, Gilbey and Roe all made their debuts. In front of a crowd of approximately 12,000 fans, Gilbey scored the club's first Third Division goal, but the game ended in a 1–1 draw. Gilbey scored again four days later as Gillingham beat Reading 2–1 away from home to register their first victory. Gillingham lost 3–0 away to Southampton on 4 September, a game in which the correspondent for the Daily Herald described them as "hopelessly outclassed", but then again beat Reading, after which they were 7th out of 22 teams in the league table, only one point behind leaders Portsmouth. The team drew their next two games but were then heavily defeated away to Merthyr Town, losing 6–1. The Daily Telegraph's reporter stated that the size of the defeat was more down to Gillingham's poor defence than the quality of their opponents' attack. Needham made his debut in the defeat and would play in every game for the remainder of the season.

Gillingham played Plymouth Argyle in both the last match of September and first of October and lost both games. Wood, Gillingham's top goalscorer in the previous season, played his first game of the season in the second of the two matches. He failed to score as Gillingham lost 1–0 to a goal in the last few minutes which the Weekly Dispatch's reporter described as "unexpected". Wood scored his first Football League goal for Gillingham a week later against Exeter City but his team lost for the fourth consecutive game, after which they had slipped to 19th in the table. Gillingham beat Exeter 2–1 at Priestfield Road on 16 October, but it would prove to be their last Third Division win for more than three months. They lost 4–0 away to Millwall on 23 October, after which the Dispatch's reporter noted that Millwall were considerably better than Gillingham, and ended the month with a goalless draw against the same opponents. The crowd for the latter game was reported as 12,000, tying with the game against Southampton in August for the largest recorded attendance of the season at Priestfield Road.

For the third consecutive match, Gillingham failed to score a goal when they lost 1–0 away to Newport County in the first match of November. A 4–1 defeat at home to the same opponents a week later left Gillingham bottom of the table. Hall was absent from the team for the only time during the season on 27 November; his replacement Thomas Robinson scored Gillingham's second goal as they came back from two goals down to draw 2–2 against Portsmouth, but it would prove to be the last of his three appearances for the team. Gillingham drew 1–1 away to Swindon Town on 11 December but then began a run of five consecutive league defeats. A week after losing to Northampton Town in the FA Cup, Gillingham were defeated by the same opponents in the league, losing 5–2 at home on Christmas Day. They then lost away to Northampton two days later. Gillingham's final match of 1920 resulted in another heavy defeat as the team lost 5–0 away to Luton Town; the correspondent for the Daily Telegraph stated that, had it not been for the performance of goalkeeper Branfield, "Gillingham would have suffered a more severe reverse". At the end of December Gillingham remained bottom of the Third Division.

=== January–April ===
Arthur Wood scored five goals in the second half of the season.

Gillingham's first match of 1921 was away to Watford on 1 January and resulted in a fourth consecutive league defeat. Roe, brought into the team for the first time since November, gave his team the lead but Watford scored three times to secure what the Dispatch's correspondent described as an easy victory. Two weeks later, the team lost by the same score at home to Brentford; both Branfield and Robertson were missing from the team, the only time that either was absent during the season. The losing run came to an end with a 3–3 draw against Brentford on 22 January; Needham scored two goals and Wood one. Seven days later the team won their first Third Division match for more than three months when a goal from Needham gave them a 1–0 win at home to Bristol Rovers. Despite the victory, Gillingham remained bottom of the division at the end of January.

In February, Gillingham played four matches, which resulted in a draw and three defeats; the team only scored one goal in the four games. A week after beating Bristol Rovers at home, they lost 2–0 away to the same opponents, and then drew 0–0 at home to Norwich City. Gillingham played Norwich again on 19 February and lost 2–1, and ended the month with a 1–0 defeat at home to league leaders Crystal Palace. In a tactical change, Needham, who had played several games as a forward, moved back to a half-back position against Crystal Palace; Baxter, normally a half-back, was included in the team for the first time in over a month and played as centre-forward. After three games in which he did not score any goals he was dropped once more. Gillingham again played Crystal Palace in the first game of March; the score was 1–1 with approximately ten minutes remaining but the league leaders then scored three times to win the game. After three consecutive defeats, Gillingham beat Brighton & Hove Albion 1–0 on 12 March, but then failed to win any of the next five games. Over the Easter period the team played three games in four days, which resulted in a draw and two defeats.

Gillingham began April with a 2–1 victory at home to Grimsby Town and followed it up with a 1–0 victory away to Queens Park Rangers a week later; it was the first time during the season that they had won two consecutive league games. Wood scored a goal in both games and did so again as the team drew 1–1 at home to Swindon Town on 13 April. The run of three league games without defeat was the longest the team had managed since the previous September, but they then lost consecutive matches to Queens Park Rangers and Swansea Town. Gillingham ended April with a 2–1 win at home to Swansea Town, Wood scoring the winning goal, his fourth in six games. The team's final match of the season was at home to Luton Town and resulted in a goalless draw. Gillingham finished the season bottom of the Third Division, two points below 21st-placed Brentford. Having finished bottom of the Southern League Division One in the seasons immediately before and after the First World War, the team had now finished last in their division for three consecutive seasons.

=== Match details ===
Key

- In result column, Gillingham's score shown first
- H = Home match
- A = Away match
- pen. = Penalty kick
- o.g. = Own goal

Results

Date	Opponents	Result	Goalscorers	Attendance
28 August 1920	Southampton (H)	1–1	Gilbey	12,000
1 September 1920	Reading (A)	2–1	Roe, Gilbey	7,000
4 September 1920	Southampton (A)	0–3		14,000
8 September 1920	Reading (H)	1–0	Gilbey	7,000
11 September 1920	Merthyr Town (H)	0–0		9,500
15 September 1920	Portsmouth (H)	1–1	Battiste	5,000
18 September 1920	Merthyr Town (A)	1–6	Thompson	14,000
25 September 1920	Plymouth Argyle (A)	1–3	Hall	16,000
2 October 1920	Plymouth Argyle (H)	0–1		10,000
9 October 1920	Exeter City (A)	1–2	Wood	10,000
16 October 1920	Exeter City (H)	2–1	Battiste (2, 1 pen.)	10,000
23 October 1920	Millwall (A)	0–4		20,000
30 October 1920	Millwall (H)	0–0		12,000
6 November 1920	Newport County (A)	0–1		8,000
13 November 1920	Newport County (H)	1–4	Needham	8,000
27 November 1920	Portsmouth (A)	2–2	Gilbey, Robinson	15,000
11 December 1920	Swindon Town (A)	1–1	Gilbey	9,000
25 December 1920	Northampton Town (H)	2–5	Gilbey, Hall	8,000
27 December 1920	Northampton Town (A)	0–2		10,000
28 December 1920	Luton Town (A)	0–5		11,000
1 January 1921	Watford (A)	1–3	Roe	6,000
15 January 1921	Brentford (H)	1–3	Hall	8,000
22 January 1921	Brentford (A)	3–3	Needham (2), Wood (pen.)	9,000
29 January 1921	Bristol Rovers (H)	1–0	Needham	8,000
5 February 1921	Bristol Rovers (A)	0–2		9,000
12 February 1921	Norwich City (H)	0–0		7,000
19 February 1921	Norwich City (A)	1–2	Hall	8,000
26 February 1921	Crystal Palace (H)	0–1		8,000
5 March 1921	Crystal Palace (A)	1–4	Hall	10,000
12 March 1921	Brighton & Hove Albion (H)	1–0	Waugh	7,000
16 March 1921	Watford (H)	1–1	Hall	6,000
19 March 1921	Brighton & Hove Albion (A)	0–1		9,000
25 March 1921	Southend United (H)	1–1	Hall	11,000
26 March 1921	Grimsby Town (A)	0–2		11,000
28 March 1921	Southend United (A)	0–1		10,000
2 April 1921	Grimsby Town (H)	2–1	Waugh (pen.), Wood	7,000
9 April 1921	Queens Park Rangers (A)	1–0	Wood	10,000
13 April 1921	Swindon Town (H)	1–1	Wood	8,000
16 April 1921	Queens Park Rangers (H)	1–2	Hall	8,000
23 April 1921	Swansea Town (A)	0–2		13,000
30 April 1921	Swansea Town (H)	2–1	Hall, Wood	8,000
7 May 1921	Luton Town (H)	0–0		6,000

=== Partial league table ===
Football League Third Division final table, bottom positions
Pos	Team	Pld	W	D	L	GF	GA	GAv	Pts	
19	Exeter City	42	10	15	17	39	54	0.722	35	
20	Reading	42	12	7	23	42	59	0.712	31	
21	Brentford	42	9	12	21	42	67	0.627	30	Required to apply for re-election
22	Gillingham	42	8	12	22	34	74	0.459	28	Required to apply for re-election

== FA Cup ==
Gillingham entered the 1920–21 FA Cup at the fourth qualifying round stage, where they were drawn to play near-neighbours Maidstone United of the Kent League. Maidstone's goalkeeper saved two penalty kicks by Battiste but a goal from Gilbey meant that Gillingham beat their non-League opponents 1–0. In the fifth qualifying round, Gillingham played another non-League team, Dulwich Hamlet of the Isthmian League, and won 2–1. In the sixth and final qualifying round, Gillingham's opponents were fellow Third Division team Northampton Town, who won 3–1 to eliminate Gillingham from the competition.

=== Match details ===
Key

- In result column, Gillingham's score shown first
- H = Home match
- A = Away match
- pen. = Penalty kick
- o.g. = Own goal

Results

Date	Round	Opponents	Result	Goalscorers	Attendance
20 November 1920	Fourth qualifying	Maidstone United (H)	1–0	Gilbey	6,725
4 December 1920	Fifth qualifying	Dulwich Hamlet (H)	2–1	Hall, Gilbey	8,000
18 December 1920	Sixth qualifying	Northampton Town (A)	1–3	Hall	10,000

== Players ==
Tommy Hall was the leading goalscorer for the season.

During the season, 26 players made at least one appearance for Gillingham. Robertson, Branfield and Hall made the most; each missed only one match. Three players made only one appearance each: McCormick, Alfred Milton and Ernest Ollerenshaw. It was each player's only appearance for Gillingham at Football League level, and in the case of Milton and Ollerenshaw the only game each played during their entire time with the club.

Hall finished the season as the team's top scorer, with nine goals in the Third Division and two in the FA Cup; despite playing in fewer than a third of the team's games, Gilbey was the second highest-scoring player with eight goals in total.

Player statistics
Player	Position	Third Division		FA Cup		Total	
Player	Position	Apps	Goals	Apps	Goals	Apps	Goals
Wally Battiste	FW	33	3	3	0	36	3
Tom Baxter	HB	21	0	2	0	23	0
Jack Branfield	GK	41	0	3	0	44	0
Albert Carter	FW	2	0	0	0	2	0
Tom Gilbey	FW	11	6	3	2	14	8
Syd Gore	FW	8	0	0	0	8	0
Joseph Griffiths	HB	5	0	0	0	5	0
Tommy Hall	FW	41	9	3	2	44	11
Andy Holt	FW	6	0	0	0	6	0
Fred Howard	FW	7	0	0	0	7	0
Donald McCormick	FW	1	0	0	0	1	0
Stuart McMillan	FW	11	0	0	0	11	0
Alfred Milton	FB	1	0	0	0	1	0
George Needham	HB	36	4	3	0	39	4
Ernest Ollerenshaw	GK	1	0	0	0	1	0
Jock Robertson	FB	41	0	3	0	44	0
Thomas Robinson	FW	2	1	1	0	3	1
Archie Roe	FW	16	2	1	0	17	2
George Russell	FW	3	0	0	0	3	0
George Shaw	FB	3	0	0	0	3	0
Tom Sisson	FB	40	0	3	0	43	0
Tom Thompson	HB	37	1	3	0	40	1
John Waugh	HB	24	2	0	0	24	2
Clive Wigmore	HB	9	0	0	0	9	0
Arthur Wood	FW	30	6	3	0	33	6
Harry Wright	FW	32	0	2	0	34	0

FW = Forward, HB = Half-back, GK = Goalkeeper, FB = Full-back

== Aftermath ==
As a result of finishing bottom of the Third Division, Gillingham were required to apply for re-election to the Football League, but retained their place. They remained one of the strugglers in the division, which was renamed the Third Division South when a parallel Third Division North was introduced for the 1921–22 season, and it was not until the 1925–26 season that they managed to finish in the top half of the table. In 1938, Gillingham finished in the bottom two for the fifth time; on this occasion their application for re-election was unsuccessful and they were voted out of the league, returning to the Southern League.
