= 1919–20 Gillingham F.C. season =

English football club season

Gillingham
1919–20 season
- Chairman: Edward Crawley
- Manager: George Collins
- Southern League Division One: 22nd
- FA Cup: First round
- Top goalscorer: League: Arthur Wood (12); All: Arthur Wood (14)
- Highest home attendance: Approx. 10,000 vs Swansea Town (20 December 1919), Swindon Town (14 February 1920), and Brighton & Hove Albion (28 February 1920)
- Lowest home attendance: Approx. 2,000 vs Swansea Town (19 April 1920)
Home colours

During the 1919–20 English football season, Gillingham F.C. played in the Southern League Division One. It was the 22nd season in which the club competed in the Southern League, and the 21st in Division One; prior to the season, the club had been inactive for over four years due to the First World War. George Collins was appointed as the club's new manager, and most of the players were new; the club struggled to find a settled team during the season, fielding nearly 40 players, including six goalkeepers. The team's results included a run of 14 league games, from October to February, without a win. Gillingham finished bottom of the league table but nonetheless gained entry to the national Football League when it absorbed the entirety of the Southern League Division One.

Gillingham also competed in the FA Cup, requiring three replays to progress from the sixth qualifying round before losing in the first round proper. The team played 47 competitive matches, winning 11, drawing 10, and losing 26. Arthur Wood was the team's top goalscorer, with 12 goals in the league and 14 in total. Tom Leslie made the most appearances, playing 40 times. The highest attendance recorded at the club's home ground, Priestfield Road, was approximately 10,000 for league games against Swindon Town and Brighton & Hove Albion and an FA Cup match against Swansea Town.

== Background and pre-season ==
Gillingham, founded in 1893 and known as New Brompton until 1912, had played in the Southern League since the competition's formation in 1894. The team had been promoted from Division Two in 1895 and remained in Division One ever since but with minimal success, rarely finishing in the top half of the league table. The 1919–20 season was the first time the Southern League operated after the First World War; Gillingham had not played a competitive match since the 1914–15 season, when they had finished bottom of the table. Earlier in the year, the Southern League had proposed an amalgamation with the national Football League, but it was rejected.

In July, George Collins was appointed as Gillingham's new manager in place of Sam Gilligan, who did not return to the club after the war. As was the norm at the time, Collins had responsibility for team tactics and training, but other tasks associated with a modern manager, such as the signing of new players, were the responsibility of the club's secretary, William Ironside Groombridge. Most of the Gillingham players from the final season before the war did not return, and the club signed a host of new players to take their place. The new signings included Arthur Wood, a forward who had last played for Fulham of the Football League Second Division; he was able to resume his career despite having suffered an injury while fighting in the war which necessitated the insertion of a metal plate into his forehead and limited his ability to head the ball. Other new players to join Gillingham included Bobby Beale, a goalkeeper born in nearby Maidstone who had previously played over a hundred Football League games for Manchester United, and David Chalmers, a Scottish forward who had also seen active service during the war. The team reverted to wearing a kit of black-and-white striped shirts, white shorts, and black socks, which had been the club's colours from its formation until shortly before the war when a blue and red kit was adopted.

== Southern League Division One ==
=== August–December ===
Arthur Wood scored both goals in Gillingham's first home win of the season.

Gillingham's first match of the season was at their own home ground, Priestfield Road, against Watford, the Southern League champions in the final season before the war. Tom Leslie and Jack Mahon were the only players in the Gillingham team who had represented the club before the hostilities. The match ended in a 0–0 draw; the correspondent for The Daily Telegraph noted that Gillingham's forwards played well and that Watford had their full-backs to thank for the fact that Gillingham could not manage to score a goal. Gillingham lost two days later away to Luton Town, but then gained their first win of the season, beating Swansea Town with a goal from W. Savage; Abel Lee, another pre-war Gillingham player, made his return in the victory. The team followed this with a home win against Luton on 10 September; Wood scored both goals. Following this game, Gillingham failed to score in their remaining four matches in September, which resulted in one draw and three defeats. The run included a 5–0 loss away to Cardiff City, in which the Cardiff-based Western Mail contended that Gillingham's defence, prior to this game one of the best in the league, had experienced a "sensational collapse" and that the home team's goalkeeper was "practically a spectator".

The team's run of consecutive defeats continued in October, with a 5–2 defeat away to Swindon Town and a 2–0 loss at home to Plymouth Argyle. Full-back Bill Cartwright made his debut against Swindon. Gillingham ended their losing run with a 2–0 victory at home to Millwall on 11 October; Wood again scored twice. The Daily Herald's reporter praised Millwall's goalkeeper and said that the team were fortunate to concede only two goals. Beale played his last game for the club in a 3–1 defeat away to Newport County on 25 October; over the next seven games, the team used four different goalkeepers, none of whom played more than twice. Changes continued to be made to the team; forward Alex Redpath made his debut against Newport and half-back A. Harris and forwards Harry Dawson and C. Denny all played for the first time against Northampton Town on 8 November. Denny never made another appearance and Dawson and Harris both played only once more.

Gillingham ended November with two more defeats, losing 4–1 to Crystal Palace and 5–0 to Norwich City; the Sunday Mercury said that in the former game Crystal Palace were "easily superior" and that in the latter Norwich "toyed with their opponents". Another new forward, H. Kelly, debuted against Norwich, as did half-backs Alex Steel and Jimmy Kennedy, signed from Southend United and Watford respectively. The team began December with two further defeats, losing 2–0 at home to Brentford and 4–0 away to Merthyr Town; Steel's brother Bobby, a new signing from Tottenham Hotspur, made his debut in the latter game as the team's latest new forward. Gillingham's final three league games of 1919 took place on consecutive days beginning on Christmas Day when they lost 2–1 at home to Reading. Against the same opponents the following day, goalkeeper Jack Branfield, who had played twice for Gillingham in 1915, made his return as his team lost 3–0; he would remain first-choice goalkeeper for the remainder of the season, missing only one match. The team's last league game of the year took place on 27 December and resulted in a 1–1 draw away to Bristol Rovers, meaning that Gillingham had gone 11 league games without a victory.

=== January–May ===
A cartoon printed in the Chatham Observer newspaper criticised Portsmouth's aggressive style of play in their goalless draw with Gillingham in March.

Gillingham played only two league games in January and their winless run continued as they lost away to Watford and Exeter City. Following a goalless draw with Queens Park Rangers, Gillingham beat Swindon Town on 14 February to end a run of 14 league games without a victory stretching back to October; Harry Lee scored twice in the victory. The team lost their next two games, away to Millwall and at home to Brighton & Hove Albion, and ended February bottom of the league table, five points below 21st-placed Northampton. Gillingham's total of 18 goals scored in 28 games was by far the lowest in the division; no other team had scored fewer than 30.

The team began March with a third consecutive defeat, losing 4–0 away to Newport County, but then achieved a goalless draw at home to Portsmouth, who were top of the table; Branfield saved a Portsmouth penalty kick. The Chatham Observer praised Abel Lee and the Steel brothers for keeping the Portsmouth forwards in check, and criticised the league leaders for their aggressive style of play. The Weekly Dispatch described it as a "rough game" and said that at one point players came to blows. Gillingham next played another team challenging for the league championship, Cardiff City, and after taking the lead after just two minutes went on to win 3–0, only the second time during the season that they had scored three goals in a league game. After two more defeats, Gillingham ended March with a 2–0 win over Southampton. Full-back Jock Robertson made his debut in a 1–0 victory over Southend United on 3 April. He would go on to play for the club until 1933 and make over 350 appearances in the Football League after Gillingham joined that competition in 1920, setting a club record which would stand for over 30 years.

Gillingham beat Norwich City and Brentford on 10 and 17 April respectively, the first time the team had won two consecutive games since the previous September. Both Steel brothers, who had been regulars in the team since joining Gillingham, were absent from the team for the next game against Swansea Town; despite having to play the whole of the second half with only ten men after one of their players was injured, Swansea won 1–0. There were further changes to the team for the next game at home to Merthyr Town: half-back Joseph Griffiths made his debut and Len Ramsell played for the first time since January in place of Wood. Gillingham fell behind to a goal in the first half but scored three times to record their third victory in four games; the Western Mail stated that Merthyr were "very easily beaten". The team's final match of the season was a 2–2 draw at home to Bristol Rovers. Gillingham finished the season bottom of the league table; although they did not have the worst defence in the division, they had scored only 34 goals during the season, more than 10 fewer than any other team. Such had been the turnover of players during the season that only Leslie and Mahon were in the team for both the first and last matches of the campaign.

=== League match details ===
Key

- In the result column, Gillingham's score is shown first
- H = Home match
- A = Away match
- pen. = Penalty kick
- o.g. = Own goal

Results

Date	Opponents	Result	Goalscorers	Attendance
30 August 1919	Watford (H)	0–0		7,000
1 September 1919	Luton Town (A)	0–2		4,000
6 September 1919	Swansea Town (A)	1–0	Savage	2,304
10 September 1919	Luton Town (H)	2–0	Wood (2, 1 pen.)	not recorded
13 September 1919	Exeter City (H)	0–0		7,808
17 September 1919	Southend United (H)	0–1		6,000
20 September 1919	Cardiff City (A)	0–5		10,000
27 September 1919	Queens Park Rangers (H)	0–1		7,432
4 October 1919	Swindon Town (A)	2–5	Chalmers, Wood (pen.)	5,000
6 October 1919	Plymouth Argyle (H)	0–2		2,500
11 October 1919	Millwall (H)	2–0	Wood (2)	7,000
18 October 1919	Brighton & Hove Albion (A)	0–3		8,000
25 October 1919	Newport County (H)	1–3	John	8,000
1 November 1919	Portsmouth (A)	0–4		10,000
8 November 1919	Northampton Town (H)	0–0		7,000
15 November 1919	Crystal Palace (A)	1–4	Redpath	not recorded
29 November 1919	Norwich City (A)	0–5		6,000
6 December 1919	Brentford (H)	0–2		7,000
13 December 1919	Merthyr Town (A)	0–4		not recorded
25 December 1919	Reading (H)	1–2	B. Read	8,000
26 December 1919	Reading (A)	0–3		10,000
27 December 1919	Bristol Rovers (A)	1–1	B. Steel	14,000
3 January 1920	Watford (A)	1–2	McCormick	4,000
24 January 1920	Exeter City (A)	1–2	Savage	6,000
7 February 1920	Queens Park Rangers (A)	0–0		10,000
14 February 1920	Swindon Town (H)	3–1	H. Lee (2), B. Steel	10,000
21 February 1920	Millwall (A)	0–1		12,000
28 February 1920	Brighton & Hove Albion (H)	2–3	Wood (2)	10,000
6 March 1920	Newport County (A)	0–4		not recorded
13 March 1920	Portsmouth (H)	0–0		7,783
17 March 1920	Cardiff City (H)	3–0	H. Lee, B. Read, Savage	6,000
20 March 1920	Northampton Town (A)	0–1		7,000
27 March 1920	Crystal Palace (H)	2–4	B. Read, Wood (pen.)	7,000
2 April 1920	Southampton (H)	2–0	Wood, Kelly	8,794
3 April 1920	Southend United (A)	1–0	Wood	7,000
5 April 1920	Southampton (A)	0–2		12,000
10 April 1920	Norwich City (H)	1–0	Wood	6,000
17 April 1920	Brentford (A)	2–1	H. Lee, Wood	8,000
19 April 1920	Swansea Town (H)	0–1		2,000
24 April 1920	Merthyr Town (H)	3–1	B. Steel, A. Lee (pen.), Griffiths	7,000
26 April 1920	Plymouth Argyle (A)	0–2		9,000
1 May 1920	Bristol Rovers (H)	2–2	B. Read, Mahon (pen.)	6,000

=== Partial league table ===
Southern League Division One final table, bottom positions
Pos	Team	Pld	W	D	L	GF	GA	GAv	Pts
19	Northampton Town	42	12	9	21	64	103	0.621	33
20	Luton Town	42	10	10	22	51	76	0.671	30
21	Merthyr Town	42	9	11	22	47	78	0.603	29
22	Gillingham	42	10	7	25	34	74	0.459	27

== FA Cup ==
Gillingham entered the 1919–20 FA Cup at the sixth and final qualifying round stage, where they were paired with fellow Southern League Division One team Swansea Town. The initial match took place at Priestfield Road and drew an attendance of 10,000, matching those recorded for league games against Brighton and Swindon for the season's largest crowd at the ground. Leslie scored with a penalty kick in a game that finished in a 1–1 draw, necessitating a replay. Gillingham made four team changes for the second game, including bringing in Ramsell, who scored in another 1–1 draw. The second replay took place at a neutral venue, Ninian Park in Cardiff, and ended goalless. The third replay was held at Chelsea's Stamford Bridge stadium; Gillingham took a 2–0 lead in the first half through Bobby Steel and Wood, and finally progressed to the next round, winning the game 3–1; The Daily Telegraph wrote that Gillingham were "the superior side" and that "to beat so decisively the team standing seventh in [the Southern League Division One] was a praiseworthy performance".

In the first round proper, Gillingham played away to West Stanley of the North Eastern League; unlike Gillingham, West Stanley had never previously progressed beyond the qualifying rounds of the competition. After conceding a goal early on, Gillingham drew level before half time. In the second half, however, they played poorly and West Stanley scored twice more to win the match and eliminate Gillingham from the competition. West Stanley's local newspaper called the result a "sensation" and said it would go down in the history of the mining village.

=== Cup match details ===
- In the result column, Gillingham's score is shown first
- H = Home match
- A = Away match
- N = Match played at neutral venue
- pen. = Penalty kick
- o.g. = Own goal

Results

Date	Round	Opponents	Result	Goalscorers	Attendance
20 December 1919	Sixth qualifying	Swansea Town (H)	1–1	Leslie (pen.)	10,000
24 December 1919	Sixth qualifying (replay)	Swansea Town (A)	1–1 (a.e.t.)	Ramsell	10,000
29 December 1919	Sixth qualifying (second replay)	Swansea Town (N)	0–0 (a.e.t.)		6,000
5 January 1920	Sixth qualifying (third replay)	Swansea Town (N)	3–1	Wood (2), Steel	15,000
17 January 1920	First	West Stanley (A)	1–3	B. Read	6,000

== Players ==
Jack Branfield was one of six goalkeepers used by Gillingham during the season.

Jock Robertson began his lengthy career with Gillingham during the season.

Abel Lee made 35 appearances.

During the season, 39 players made at least one appearance for Gillingham. Leslie made the most, playing 40 times; Mahon, Wood, and Abel Lee all made more than 30 appearances. The instability of the team during the season resulted in 12 players each making fewer than five appearances. Three of these, C. Denny, W. Hunter, and T. Turner, each played only once and never made another appearance for the Gillingham first team.

Fifteen players scored at least one goal during the season. Wood was the team's top scorer, with 12 goals in the league and two in the FA Cup; no other player scored more than five times.

Player statistics
Player	Position	Southern League Division One		FA Cup		Total	
Player	Position	Apps	Goals	Apps	Goals	Apps	Goals
Bobby Beale	GK	12	0	0	0	12	0
Alf Bluer	HB	3	0	0	0	3	0
Billy Bower	GK	3	0	2	0	5	0
Jack Branfield	GK	21	0	3	0	24	0
Robert Buchanan	FB	19	0	5	0	24	0
Bill Cartwright	FB	21	0	0	0	21	0
R. Cavanna	HB	5	0	0	0	5	0
David Chalmers	FW	12	1	1	0	13	1
Harry Dawson	FW	2	0	0	0	2	0
C. Denny	FW	1	0	0	0	1	0
C. Elliott	HB	4	0	1	0	5	0
W. Frost	FB	10	0	0	0	10	0
Syd Gore	FW	1	0	0	0	1	0
Joseph Griffiths	HB	3	1	0	0	3	1
A. Harris	HB	2	0	0	0	2	0
W. Hibden	HB	15	0	2	0	17	0
W. Hunter	FB	1	0	0	0	1	0
Cornelius John	FW	7	1	0	0	7	1
John Joyce	GK	2	0	0	0	2	0
H. Kelly	FW	21	1	5	0	26	1
Jimmy Kennedy	HB	9	0	0	0	9	0
Abel Lee	HB	30	1	5	0	35	1
Harry Lee	FW	22	4	3	0	25	4
Tom Leslie	FB	35	0	5	1	40	1
Jack Mahon	HB	34	1	2	0	36	1
Donald McCormick	FW	4	1	0	0	4	1
J. Meath	GK	2	0	0	0	2	0
Bert Nash	FW	13	0	0	0	13	0
John Neil	FW	9	0	0	0	9	0
Len Ramsell	FW	9	0	4	1	13	1
B. Read	FW	17	4	5	1	22	5
Trevett Read	GK	2	0	0	0	2	0
Alex Redpath	FW	12	1	0	0	12	1
Jock Robertson	FB	7	0	0	0	7	0
W. Savage	FW	18	3	0	0	18	3
Alex Steel	HB	23	0	5	0	28	0
Bobby Steel	FW	19	3	4	1	23	4
T. Turner	FW	1	0	0	0	1	0
Arthur Wood	FW	31	12	3	2	34	14

FW = Forward, HB = Half-back, GK = Goalkeeper, FB = Full-back

== Aftermath ==
Collins left his position as Gillingham manager at the end of the season and was replaced by Robert Brown. At the annual general meeting (AGM) of the Football League on 31 May 1920, the clubs in the existing two divisions voted to admit those in the Southern League's top division en masse to form the new Third Division. Initially it was unclear if Gillingham, by virtue of their last-place finish, would be relegated to the Southern League Division Two before this took effect and thus miss out on a place in the Football League; at the club's own AGM on 3 June, angry supporters demanded to know what the club's status would be for the coming season, but the board of directors was unable to give an answer. Shortly afterwards, it was confirmed that Gillingham would indeed be entering the Football League. In their first season in the Third Division, the team again finished bottom of the league table.
