= Harry Dawson =

Harry Dawson may refer to:

- Harry Dawson (association footballer) (1886–?), English footballer
- Harry Dawson (Gaelic footballer) (born 1992), Gaelic football player
- Harry Dawson (priest), Dean of Niagara
- Harry Dawson, cinematographer for the film Corwin

== See also ==
- Henry Dawson (disambiguation)
- Harold Dawson (disambiguation)
