= Alfred Carter =

Alfred Carter may refer to:

- Alfred Carter (cricketer) (1869–1920), Australian cricketer and Australian Rules footballer
- Alfred Carter (footballer) (1877–1960), English footballer
- Howard Carter (Pentecostal pioneer) (Alfred Howard Carter, 1891–1971), American Pentecostal
- Alfred Wellington Carter (1867–1949), former Parker Ranch manager
- Alfred Williams Carter (1894–1986), Canadian World War I ace pilot

== See also ==
- Al Carter (disambiguation)
