= Albert Carter =

Albert Carter may refer to:

- Albert E. Carter (1881–1964), American politician
- Albert Desbrisay Carter (1892–1919), Canadian World War I ace pilot
- Albert Carter (footballer) (1898–?), English association football player of the 1920s
- Al Carter (born 1952), American reporter and sports columnist

== See also ==
- Al Carter (disambiguation)
