= Harold Dawson (disambiguation) =

Harold Dawson cricketer.

Harold Dawson may also refer to:

- Harry Dawson (association footballer), Harold Dawson, footballer
- Harold Dawson, see RAM press
- Harold Dawson, fictional character in A Few Good Men

== See also ==
- Harry Dawson (disambiguation)
