= Tom Gilbey =

Tom Gilbey may refer to:

- Tom Gilbey (footballer) (1898–1962), English footballer
- Tom Gilbey (designer) (1938–2017), British fashion designer
