= Ted Harper =

English footballer

Personal information
- Full name: Edward Cashfield Harper
- Date of birth: August 22, 1901
- Place of birth: Sheerness, England
- Date of death: July 22, 1959 (aged 57)
- Position: Centre-forward

Senior career*
Years	Team	Apps	(Gls)
- Whitstable Town F.C.
- Sheppey United F.C.
1923–1927	Blackburn Rovers F.C.		
1927–1929	Sheffield Wednesday F.C.		
1929–1931	Tottenham Hotspur F.C.		
1931–1933	Preston North End F.C.		
1933–1934	Blackburn Rovers F.C.		

International career
1926	England	1	(0)
- * Club domestic league appearances and goals

Edward Cashfield Harper (22 August 1901 – 22 July 1959) was an English footballer, who played at centre-forward scoring a then record high of 43 league goals in a season in 1925–26 for Blackburn Rovers. He also holds the record for Preston North End scoring 37 goals in Division Two in the 1932–33 season.

Born in Sheerness, Ted played in Kent junior football and for Whitstable Town and Sheppey United before joining Blackburn in 1923.

During his career he played for Blackburn Rovers (1923–1927 and 1933–1934), Sheffield Wednesday (1927–1929); Tottenham Hotspur (1929–1931) and Preston North End (1931–1933) in the Football League.

In 1925-26 he scored 43 league goals for Blackburn Rovers which was a top flight record until Dixie Dean scored 60 for Everton 2 seasons later. His 43 league goals for Blackburn that season is still a single season club record.

He was signed for Spurs from Sheffield Wednesday in March 1929 for a fee of £5,500, breaking the club record which had been created only a few weeks earlier when Baden Herod was signed for £4,000 from Brentford. He scored on his Tottenham debut in a 3–2 victory over Clapton Orient at Clapton Stadium in March 1929 in the old Second Division. That match saw Orient set their record attendance at the Clapton Stadium, with 37,615 in attendance. Harper went on to set a then club record by scoring 36 goals for the 'Lilywhites' in 1930–31 season. That record stood until Bobby Smith in the 1957–58 season.

He moved North and scored 37 goals for Preston North End in Division Two in the 1932–33 season, which still stands as the club goal scoring record.

Harper took on a coaching role at Blackburn following his retirement at 33, and was employed at English Electric until his death aged 57.

Harper won one cap for England against Scotland in a Home International on 17 April 1926.
