= Little Lever F.C. =

Defunct association football club

Little Lever
- Full name: Little Lever Football Club
- Nickname: the Leveritess
- Founded: 1889
- Dissolved: 1901?
- Ground: Queen Anne Hotel
- Secretary: 1891: Walter Ashurst; 1898: J. W. Sunderland
Home colours

Little Lever F.C. was an association football club from Little Lever, Lancashire, active in the 19th century.

== History ==
The club was founded out of the Little Lever Cricket Club, one of whose members - Matthew Fletcher, a director of a colliery and chairman of Little Lever District Council - was "determined to make the Little Lever Football Club a success". Another of the club's founders, John Hayward, was an original shareholder in the Bolton Wanderers limited company.

The Leverites joined the Lancashire Alliance in 1890, generally finishing in the lower mid-table; in the 1890–91 season, the club's secretary, Walter Ashurst, undertook refereeing duties for a top of the table clash between Leigh Association and Hindley, but after disallowing two Hindley goals for offside, was attached by 400 of the visiting supporters, having to escape to a private house.

In 1894–95, the club rose to 5th place, and indeed was in the running for second place before a late run of defeats. This prompted the club to apply to join the Lancashire Combination from the 1895–96 season, and the club was accepted as a member, alongside (among others) the former Football League side Accrington. The club finished its first season in a respectable 10th out of 14 clubs, Accrington resigning during the season.

However, Matthew Fletcher had died in early 1896, and the spark went out of the club; the club was also not helped by having to change its ground in November 1896, the resulting lack of facilities dropping its paid crowds to 300. It pulled out of the Comnbination in February 1897 while lying 14th in the 16 team table, with 6 wins in 19 matches, and was reported as being defunct, but the club was promptly revived in the Central Lancashire League for the 1897–98 season. The club found success at this lower level, winning the Dr Parks Senior Cup in 1897–98 and 1898–99 by beating Black Lane Temperance and Blackrod in successive finals.

The Central Lancashire League however disbanded after the 1900–01 season, after only four clubs (Little Lever, Heywood United, Black Lane, and Bolton St Luke's) attended the annual general meeting, to find merger talks with a Bolton league had failed. The club appears to have disbanded, with replacement clubs Little Lever Rovers and Little Lever St Matthews taking over the association berth in the town.

== Colours ==
The club's colours were blue and white.

== Ground ==
The club originally played at the cricket ground behind the Queen Anne Hotel, near Bradley Fold railway station, but in August 1894 moved to a "splendid" and "much superior" field at Lord Street. However the club was only able to use it for a couple of seasons, being forced to go back to the old ground in November 1896, despite its non-use for two years.

== Notable players ==
One Leverite went on to play for the England national football team; inside-right Dan Cunliffe, for whom Little Lever was his first club, playing for the Leverites in the 1892–93 season. In 1900 he became the first Portsmouth F.C. player to gain England honours.

Bethell Robinson played for the club in the 1890–91 season.
