= Henry Dawson =

Henry Dawson may refer to:

- Henry Dawson (cricketer) (1791–1889), amateur English cricketer
- Henry Dawson (artist) (1811–1878), English landscape painter
- Henry B. Dawson (1821–1889), English-born American historian
- Henry Gordon Dawson (1862–1918), Irish mathematician
- Henry Dawson (priest) (1792–1840), Church of Ireland priest and antiquarian
- Henry Hardwick Dawson (1900–1962), English architect based in Nottingham
- Henry Ward Dawson (1890–1963), American tennis player
- Henry Dawson (Australian politician) (1849–1919), New South Wales colonial politician
- Henry Dawson (MP), member of parliament for Cumberland
- Henry Dawson (wool merchant), founded H. Dawson & Co. of Bradford

== See also ==
- Harry Dawson (disambiguation)
- Henry Dawson-Damer, 3rd Earl of Portarlington (1822–1889), Irish peer
