= Skerries Harps GAA =

Gaelic games club in County Dublin, Ireland

Skerries Harps
- Cláirseacha na Sceirí
- Founded: 1908
- County: Dublin
- Nickname: The Harps
- Colours: Blue and white
- Grounds: Harps Main Pitch; Townparks; Ballast Pit; Skerries Mills Pitch
- Coordinates: 53°34′40.97″N 6°06′48.10″W

Playing kits
Standard colours

Skerries Harps is a Gaelic Athletic Association club based in Skerries, County Dublin, Ireland, playing Gaelic football, hurling and camogie. The club is located on the Dublin Road in Skerries with a main pitch and club house at this location. The club has just under 40 teams competing at all levels in football, hurling, camogie and ladies football. The club plays at senior level in football and camogie, intermediate level in ladies football and junior hurling.

== Notable players ==
=== Senior inter-county footballers ===
Dublin

- Bobby Beggs
- Bryan Cullen
- Harry Dawson

Westmeath

- Jack Smith

=== Senior inter-county ladies' footballers ===
Dublin

- Lyndsey Davey

== Honours ==
- 1942 Dublin Junior Football Championship
- 1947 Fingal League
- 1950 Jubilee Cup
- 1949/51 Rowan, Fingal, Feis McArdle Priests Cup
- Feis Fingal Cup - McArdle Cup
- 1953 Dublin Junior Football Championship
- 1954 Dublin Intermediate Football Championship
- 1955 McArdle & Feis Fingal Cups
- 1963 Semi-Finalists, Dublin Senior Football Championship
- Donaghmore Junior Tournament
- 1964 Donaghmore Junior Tournament
- 1980/1 Dublin Intermediate Football League
- 1984 Fingal Intermediate Football League
- 1985 Junior Fingal Football League
- 1986 Junior Cup (Kennedy Cup)
- 1993 Nugent Cup
- 1998 Murphy Cup
- 1989 Dublin Minor A Football Championship Winners
- 2003 Dublin Minor B Football Championship: Winners
- 2003 Dublin Under 21 B Football Championship: Winners
- 2007 Dublin Junior E Hurling Championship Champions.
- 2008 Dublin Intermediate Football Play-Off Winners
- 2009 Junior Cup (Parson Cup)
- 2009 Dublin AFL Div. 7 Winner
- 2009 Dublin Minor D Football Championship: Winners
- 2009 Dublin Camogie Senior B Championship Winners
- 2011 Dublin Intermediate Football Championship Winners
- 2014 Dublin Under 21 B Football Championship: Winners
- 2015 Dublin Minor C Camogie Championship Champions
- 2015 Dublin Minor Camogie Division 3 League Winners
- 2016 Dublin AFL Division 2: Winners
- 2016 Dublin AFL Div. 10 Winner
