= Bolton St Luke's F.C. =

Bolton St Luke's
- Full name: Bolton St Luke's Football Club
- Nickname: the Saints
- Founded: 1896
- Dissolved: 1905
- Ground: Church Road
- Secretary: J. Fairhurst
Home colours

Bolton St Luke's Football Club was an association football club from the Victory District area of Bolton, Greater Manchester.

== History ==
The first reference to a Bolton St Luke's football club is under the name Bolton St Luke's Temperance, from 1891. A St Luke's club is first recorded in the 1896–97 season, playing at amateur level in Bolton, and the club won the Bolton & District League in 1899–1900 and the Bolton Cup in 1900–01; it also played in the Central Lancashire League in 1900–01. The league collapsed at the end of the season, with St Luke's being one of only four clubs (the others being Little Lever, Heywood United, and Black Lane Temperance) turning up to the annual general meeting.

The club took a considerable step forward in 1903–04, joining the Lancashire Combination, in the new second division, finishing 8th out of 18 in its first season. It also reached the 1903–04 Lancashire Junior Cup final, although losing 3–1 to Earlestown, having taken an early lead.

However, in 1904–05, the club dropped to bottom but one in the Combination table. The club succeeded with its re-election application by getting 26 votes, the second most of the seven applicants, cleared its debts (mostly for its new ground) with a friendly against Bolton Wanderers in the off-season, and was active in signing new players. However, owing to a mysterious "understanding" in relation to its new ground, the Saints disbanded on 1 August 1905, and the Combination refused to return the club's seasonal deposit.

== Colours ==
The club wore red jerseys.

== Ground ==
The club originally played at New Barn, moving to Lower Pools, close to Chorley Old Road tram terminus, in 1901; the Saints enclosed it completely in 1903 for its first Combination season.

However, the ground was considered too far from the town centre, so in 1904 it took a ten-year lease a new ground, at Captain's Clough, off Church Road, two minutes from New Barn tram station.

The club's highest recorded crowd was its final match - 3,000 for a friendly with Bolton Wanderers in April 1905.

== Notable players ==
Two future England players started out with the Saints; Ephraim Longworth, who started his career with St Luke's before becoming a legend at Liverpool, and Albert Shepherd, placed with St Luke's in 1903 by Bolton Wanderers for training, part of which included him scoring 6 goals against Clitheroe in a Junior Cup tie.

Other notable players include:

- Percy Hartley, half-back who went on to Preston North End and Exeter City
- James Nightingale, full-back
- Harry Dawson, outside-left, who later played for Everton and West Ham United
