= Percy Hartley =

English footballer (1885–?)

Personal information
- Full name: Percy Wilding Hartley
- Date of birth: 1885
- Place of birth: Bolton, England
- Position: Half back

Senior career*
Years	Team	Apps	(Gls)
- Halliwell St Paul's
- Bolton St Luke's
- Astley Bridge St Paul's
- Atherton Church House
1906–1907	Preston North End	3	(0)
- Atherton
- Huddersfield Town
- Chorley
1909–1910	Exeter City	34	(4)
- Rochdale
- Rossendale United
Total		37+	(4+)

Managerial career
- 1913–1914: Verviers
- 1919–1924: Verviers
- 1924: Royal FC
- 1924–1930: Standard Liège
- Charleroi
- Amay Sportif
- 1932–1935: Standard Liège
- * Club domestic league appearances and goals

Percy Wilding Hartley (born 1885) was an English professional football player and manager.

== Early and personal life ==
Born in Bolton in 1885, Hartley was baptised on 27 September 1895 in Halliwell. He married a woman named Jessie Archer on 18 March 1919.

== Playing career ==
Hartley played for Halliwell St Paul's, Bolton St Luke's, Astley Bridge St Paul's, Atherton Church House, Preston North End, Atherton, Huddersfield Town, Chorley, Exeter City, and Rochdale. He finished his career at Rossendale United.

== Coaching career ==
Hartley became a coach at Belgian club Verviers. He spent World War One in a German prisoner-of-war camp, before returning to Verviers, later moving to Royal FC.

Hartley managed Belgian side Standard Liège in the 1920s and 1930s. He also worked at Charleroi and Amay Sportif in between his spells at Standard. He was also a prissier during World War Two, before being released and returning to Bolton, where he worked in a factory.
