= Sheppey United F.C. =

Association football club in England

Coordinates: 51.4220°N 0.7696°E

Sheppey United
- Full name: Sheppey United Football Club
- Nickname: The Ites
- Founded: 1890
- Ground: Holm Park, Sheppey
- Capacity: 1,530
- Owner(s): E. Batten, Ms E. Batten
- Chairman: Lee Allen & Kevin Long
- Manager: George Batten & Ian Batten
- League: Isthmian League South East Division
- 2025–26: Isthmian League South East Division, 18th of 22
Home colours	Away colours

Sheppey United F.C. is a football club based on the Isle of Sheppey in Kent. The club are members of the Isthmian League South East Division and play at the Sharrocks-The Insurance People Stadium, formerly known as Holm Park. The club is affiliated to the Football Association and is an FA Charter Standard club.

== History ==
=== Origin of football on the Isle of Sheppey ===
As in most parts of the UK, football began to make an appearance on the Isle of Sheppey in the middle of the 19th Century with local records showing teams active on the island from the 1860s onwards. Three clubs rose to prominence in this time – Sheppey Rovers, Invicta and Victoria. By the 1880s Sheppey Rovers had ceased playing with their players joining either Invicta or Victoria. In time for the 1888 Kent Merit Badge competition (the immediate precursor to today's Kent Senior Cup) the Invicta and Victoria made the decision to enter a joint side named "Sheerness" in order to challenge the two pre-eminent sides in the competition, Woolwich Arsenal and Chatham Town. In both the 1889 Kent Merit Badge and 1890 Kent Senior Cup competitions Sheerness were drawn with Chatham in the first round and lost both times. Given that Chatham were a crack side at this time Sheerness' performances were considered admirable.

=== Formation of Sheppey United ===
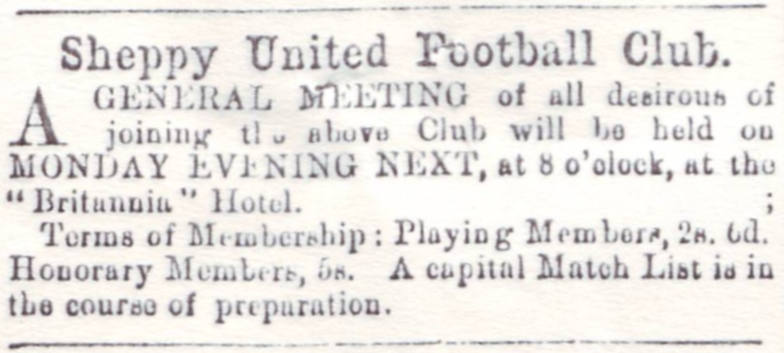
The announcement in the Sheerness Times about the formation of Sheppey United

After the performance of the 'United' Sheerness team both Invicta and Victoria saw the benefits of forming a joint side and a meeting was called for 25 August 1890 at the Britannia Hotel, Sheerness to introduce the new "Sheppey United Football Club". The club would play at the Botany Road ground of Sheppey United Cricket Club and play in blue and white shirts.

At this meeting a number of friendlies were announced with Sheppey's first game, aptly, against nearest team and rivals Sittingbourne. The game was played on 20 September 1890 at Sittingbourne's Gore Court Ground and saw Sheppey emerge victorious 3–1 despite starting the game with 10 men. The local press referred to Sheppey United as the "Sheppey-ites" in their report for this match and, subsequently, the club's nickname became The Ites and is the nickname that the club and its supporters still refer to themselves by. A familiar rallying cry for the club was "Up The Ites!" and is used in the club program to this day.

Further friendlies that season included games against Rochester, Chatham, Faversham, and Gravesend. In the 19th century, as there were very few leagues formed, clubs tended to arrange both a home and away friendly against each opponent they faced in order to fill a club's fixture list for the season.

=== Rise to prominence and founding members of the Southern League ===
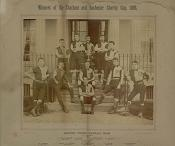
Sheppey United team from 1893 with the club's first ever trophy - the Chatham And Rochester Charity Cup

In Sheppey's first years the club was able to organise itself so well that it became one of the top sides in the south of England. In January 1892 the club drew 3–3 away at Football League club Bolton Wanderers and in the next season won 4–0 away at the region's only professional club, Arsenal, at their Manor Road ground in Plumstead with star forward Art Rule scoring 2 of the goals. That same year another professional Football League club, Accrington, were beaten 3–2 at Botany Road and Chatham Town were finally defeated in an FA Cup tie 1–0. The previous season had seen the club make their debut in the FA Cup when they played Crouch End, winning 3–1. Ashford were then beaten 2–1 before Sheppey lost 4–3 to Clapton.The same year that Chatham had finally beaten also saw the club make its debut in the FA Amateur Cup. Dover, Royal Engineers and Folkestone were all beaten before Sheppey lost 3–1 in the First Round Proper to two-time FA Cup Winners Old Etonians. This was Sheppey's last appearance in the FA Amateur Cup until 1951 as the club turned professional at the end of the 1893–94 season.

By 1888 the Football League had been formed although this was mainly limited to northern and midlands clubs (Arsenal were southern England's sole representative having joined Division 2 in 1893). In 1894 Millwall (then known as Millwall Athletic) started an initiative to form a 'Southern League'. Sheppey United were one of the attendees at the meeting where the league was formed and joined fellow Kent clubs Bromley, Chatham Town and Gillingham in being founder members, joining Division 2 with Bromley and Gillingham. The club were also founder members of the Kent League in the same year. The club were also founder members of the Thames & Medway Combination, a league that was set up when the Kent League would not let Southern League clubs enter their reserve teams in the same way that Arsenal were. Uniquely, this league was played on weekdays in a time when floodlights were not available.

In their first season in the new Southern League they finished as runners-up in Division 2, before losing the promotion/relegation test match against Clapton 5–1. The following season they finished second again, and this time won the test match, defeating Royal Ordnance Factories 4–2 to earn promotion to Division One. At the end of the season they left the Kent League. One notable performance in the FA Cup was beating West Ham United (then known as Thames Ironworks) 8–0 in a First Qualifying Round tie on 10 October 1897 at Botany Road. Sheppey's first ever game in Division 1 of the Southern League was against Tottenham Hotspur which also happened to be the first ever league game that Tottenham played.

In their first season in Division One they finished second bottom of the table, but avoided relegation by defeating RETB Chatham 2–1 in the test matches. The following season the club finished a creditable 7th out of 12 clubs in the league, including finishing above future football league clubs Swindon Town and Millwall F.C. In 1898–99 they again finished second bottom of the table but retained their Division One status after drawing the test match against Thames Ironworks 1–1. However, the following season they finished bottom of the table and lost the test match against Watford 2–1, resulting in relegation back to Division Two.

=== Departure from the Southern League ===
The club rejoined the Kent League prior to the start of the 1900–01 season, as well as remaining in the Southern League. However, after a single season back in Division Two, the club withdrew from the Southern League. The financial burden of travelling to all parts of the south of England were deemed too much with the club not in the top division of the Southern League. As a small club with a reduced population base to call on for support than most of the other sides in the league finances were always tight. In 1897 only an injection of £100 from the club's members had staved off insolvency. During Sheppey's time in the Southern League they played league games against Tottenham Hotspur, Southampton, Portsmouth, Watford, Fulham, West Ham United, Queens Park Rangers, Brentford, Bristol City, Bristol Rovers, Millwall, Reading, Wycombe Wanderers, Swindon Town and Gillingham - all professional Football League clubs today.

In 1903–04 and 1904–05 the club finished runner up in the Kent League to Chatham but in 1905–06 they finally won the Kent League winning the Chatham and Rochester Charity Cup in the same year and then won the Kent League again in the following season. In the years leading up to 1914, however, results and league positions declined and the club found itself finishing in the bottom half of the table more often than not.

=== Improved performances after World War I and return to the Southern League ===
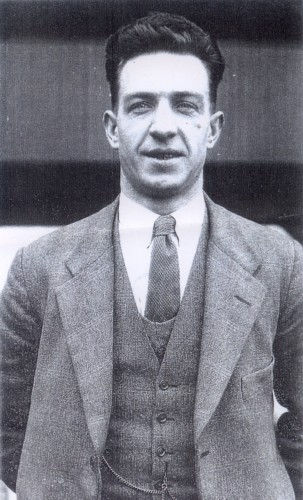
Ted Harper - Sheppey's star player of the 1920s.

Immediately following the First World War an improvement was seen in the club's performances with the club generally finishing in the top half of the Kent League and sometimes challenging for the title itself. The years after the war also saw Sheppey United reach the final of the Kent Senior Cup for the only times in its history (1922, 1927, 1929 and 1932) although all four finals were lost to Maidstone United, Northfleet United, Sittingbourne (in a replay) and Dartford respectively. In 1920 Sheppey also had their best run in the FA Cup progressing through 6 rounds of competition until reaching the 6th, and last, Qualifying Round before losing to the works side, Thorneycrofts, of Southampton 4–0. Prior to the 2023–24 season this is the nearest the club has got to reaching the First Round Proper. During this time Sheppey's side was initially built around the goalscoring talents of Ted Harper before he signed for Blackburn Rovers and, later on in the decade, former England international Danny Shea.

A third Kent League title was won in 1927–28 but this by the reserve team as the first team had rejoined the Southern League for that season and were placed in the English Section. Initially Sheppey coped well in the league twice finishing 7th to match the achievement of 1898. Unfortunately, Sheppey's return to the Southern League coincided with the Great Depression. Large numbers of clubs left the league and Sheppey started finishing lower and lower in the league. After finishing bottom of the league in both 1930–31 and 1931–32 they resigned, and returned to the Kent League in Division One. The club also decided at the end of the 1933–34 season to become an amateur club after 40 years as a professional football club.

=== Life as an amateur club ===
As an amateur club in a league that still had numerous professional clubs in it, the club struggled throughout the period leading up to the Second World War. At the end of the 1938–39 season Sheppey finished bottom of the league and should have been relegated but the league was suspended due to the Second World War. After the war Sheppey were placed back in the top division of the Kent league for the 1945–46 season. The club then remained in Division one until the 1958–59 season when the Kent league stopped. During this time the club won the Kent Amateur Cup in 1946 and 1952. On occasion Sheppey were even able to challenge for the league title and in 1951–52 the club finished 3rd. This was the high point of Sheppey's time in the old Kent League as a bottom placed finish in 1954-55 marked Sheppey's struggles at the bottom of the league.

In 1959 they were founder members of the Aetolian League, which they played in until it merged with the London League to form the Greater London League in 1964. In Sheppey's only season in this league, 1964–65, they won the 'B' Section of the league. They played the winners of the 'A' section, Eton Manor, in the Championship Final. The game finished 2–2 and the title was shared between both sides.

After winning this title the club joined the Metropolitan League and played in this league from 1966 until 1971. They had a single season in the Metropolitan–London League in 1971–72 after it was formed by a merger of the Metropolitan League and the Greater London League. To show how far Sheppey had to travel for league games in this period this league, after various mergers, is now the Spartan South Midlands Football League.

During this time Sheppey turned professional again and, apart from the club's time in the Kent County League, have been a semi-professional club ever since. Floodlights were also installed at Botany Road in 1962 and a gradual improvement in the club's fortunes was seen.

=== Kent League glory days and the Southern League revisited ===
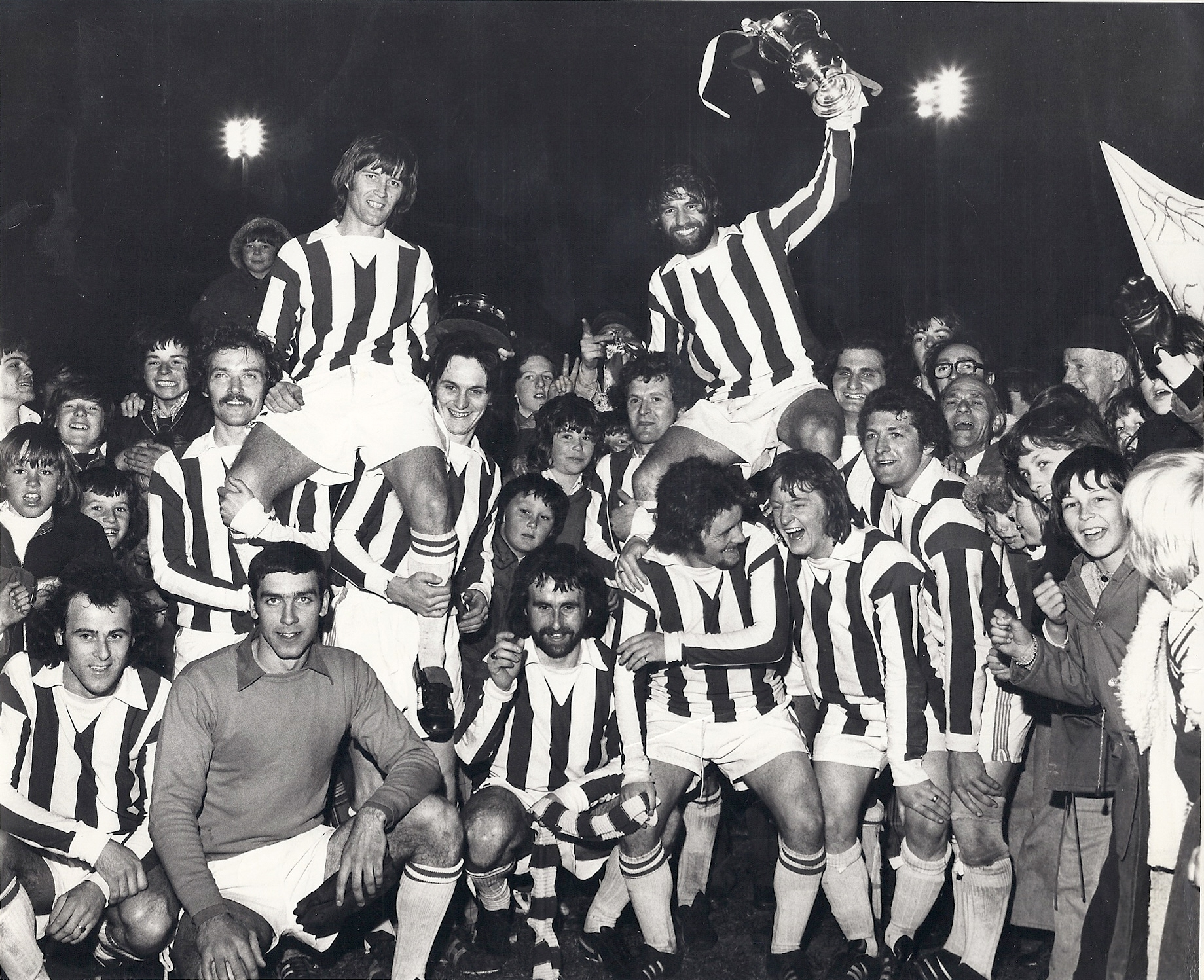
Sheppey with the Kent League Trophy after winning the title in 1975

In 1966 the Kent FA had formed a new league, the Kent Premier League (and soon to be renamed the Kent League but with no connection to the original competition of the same name). After a failed attempt to rejoin the Southern League Sheppey joined this new league in 1972. They won the title in their first season back in the league suffering only 2 defeats, scoring 127 league goals and winning the title by a massive 9 points (1972–73 Kent League). They were league champions again in 1974–75 and 1978–79 only suffering 1 league defeat in the 1979 season, as well as winning the League Cup in 1975–76 and 1978–79 and the Kent Senior Shield in 1978. Sheppey came agonisingly close to winning a 'treble' in 1978 as they were runners up in the Kent League that year and also lost the Kent League Cup Final to Tunbridge Wells. The 1970s is still Sheppey's most successful period of their history.

During the 1970s Sheppey had made numerous applications to join the Southern League but were turned down each time. After finishing second in the league again in 1983–84 as well as runners up in the Kent League Cup, the club rejoined the Southern League for a third spell as league champions Sittingbourne declined the opportunity to join the league. In Sheppey's first season back, despite being bottom of the league after 12 games and losing 8 of those games the club finished 7th and had been as high as 4th with only 3 league games to play. During their spell in the league the club also had its best run in the FA Trophy beating Met Police (Hayes), local rivals Sittingbourne and higher league clubs Gravesend and Northfleet and Billericay Town to reach the First Round where the club lost 3–0 to Dagenham. 7th was the highest that Sheppey finished and the club invariably struggled in the lower reaches of the table. It looked like the club would be relegated back to the Kent League in the 1988–89 season as the club did not win a game until a 2–0 away win against Buckingham Town on 21 December 1988. By the start of March this was the only victory secured by the club but a remarkable upturn in form saw the club climb the table by winning 9 of its last 16 games including the last 4 to finish 4th from bottom and avoid relegation. This, however, only delayed relegation by a year and after finishing bottom of Division One South in 1989–90 they were relegated to the Kent League.

=== Back to the Kent League and the nomadic years ===
Sheppey finished bottom of the table in their first season back, but a gradual improvement saw them win the league for the seventh and last time in 1994–95. In a stellar season for the club 29 out of 40 league games were won and only 2 games were lost while the team scored a mammoth 118 goals, second only to the 1973 championship winning season total of 127. The club were also finalists in the Kent League Cup in the two seasons after winning the league title (1996 and 1997). During this time financial issues had seen the club leave Botany Road at the end of the 1991–92 season after calling the ground home for 102 years. The last game played at the ground was a 2–1 Kent League victory over Kent Police on 28 March 1992.

As attempts to build/share a ground on the island repeatedly failed the club had to ground share with various Kent clubs and this saw both money and support dwindle. In March 2001 the club were forced to resign from the Kent League and their record was expunged. While the club didn't fold the senior team was disbanded until being reformed in 2003 with the club running youth teams only in the meantime. When the players coming through the youth system were old enough the senior side was reformed and they joined Division Two East of the Kent County League. They finished second in their first season behind Borden Village and were promoted to Division One East and won the Kent County League Junior Cup East in the same season. Further cup success was achieved in 2005-06 when the club won the Les Leckie Cup. The club was renamed AFC Sheppey in 2007, but was disbanded and reformed under their original name prior to the 2010–11 season. In 2012–13 Sheppey were unable to field a side for several games due to a lack of players and pulled out of the Kent County League before the season finished. Prior to the following season, the club merged with Sheerness East FC, taking Sheerness East's place in the Kent County League Premier Division and played for one season under the name Sheppey And Sheerness United FC before returning, once more, to the club's original name.

=== A new home, a new beginning ===
In April 2013 the club moved into its new ground, Holm Park. Since then promotion has been achieved from the Kent County League Premier Division to the Kent Invicta League (now the SCEFL First Division) in 2014 and, 2 years later, to the Southern Counties East Football League Premier Division. The club has also had significant success in cup competitions during this time. 4 finals in 5 years have been reached with 2 of them won (the Kent Intermediate Shield in 2013–14 and the Kent Senior Trophy in 2015–16). The club also matched its best performance in the FA Vase in 2017–18 reaching the Second Round. This period also saw a return to the FA Cup after 16 years in 2016–17 with the club losing 1–0 to Badshot Lea at Holm Park. On 3 November 2018 Sheppey won 2–1 away to Spelthorne Sports to progress to the 3rd Round of the FA Vase for the first time in the club's history.

Significant work has been made to Holm Park in the last 5 years in order to bring it up to standard for step 4 and the ground is close to achieving the ground grading necessary for further promotion.

Sheppey United have the motto "Built From The Community For The Community" and work has also been made on developing the youth section as well as an additional needs section. A number of youth team players including Alfie Bates and Ryan Freeman have progressed to the first team and the club is now an FA Charter Standard club. The club currently run an Under 18, Under 15 and Under 14 side with all three sides playing in the Kent Youth League. The stated aim of the club is to keep expanding this until the youth section covers the age groups Under 9 to Under 23.

As part of the club's Built From The Community For The Community ethos and as part of its charitable work the club announced in the Summer of 2018 the creation of The Ites Foundation. The aim of the Foundation is to raise money to invest in the youth of the Isle Of Sheppey through numerous projects.

On 1 February 2022, Sheppey defeated Corinthian 3–1 to lift the 2019–20 Kent Senior Trophy in the delayed final. The 2021–22 season continued to bring success for Sheppey after this delayed cup success and following victory at Crowborough Athletic, the Ites were guaranteed promotion to the Isthmian League on a both a points and points-per-game basis. The following week they lifted the Kent Senior Trophy for a second time in the season when a 2–1 victory over Hollands & Blair won them the 2021–22 instalment of the competition. A 3–0 win over already relegated Tower Hamlets on the final day of the season saw Sheppey reach 102 points and beat Chatham Town to the title. On 2 May 2022, the club won their fourth trophy of the season when a 5–2 final victory over Crowborough Athletic saw the side life the Southern Counties East Football League Challenge Cup.

In the 2023–24 season, the club reached the FA Cup First Round for the first time in their history. In the fourth qualifying round, they beat Billericay Town 5–4 on penalties in a replay. This secured a home tie against League Two Walsall, in which they lost 4–1.

On 15 March 2025, the club announced the death of manager Ernie Batten.

== Colours ==
The club only used its initial blue and white stripes kit until 1893, when it changed to red and white striped shirts, black shorts and black socks. Apart from playing with white shirts and socks in the 1960s and 1970s and playing in red shorts and socks while known as AFC Sheppey, the club has retained these kit colours to this day.

== Grounds ==
=== Botany Road ===
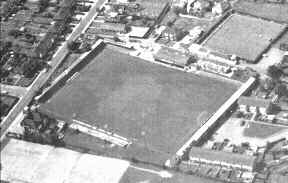
Botany Road

Sheppey's first ground was Botany Road which was the home of Sheppey United Cricket Club. The name 'Botany Road' came from the fact that the road the ground was situated on was called Botany Road before it was renamed St Georges Avenue. The club's first home game, however, was played at the army barracks at Welmarsh as Botany Road needed work before the club could move in. Upon the club's entry to the Southern League in 1895 the ground capacity was 2,000 but this was increased to 4,000 during the club's time in the league.

The ground saw regular improvements made to it until the 1970s and there were covered stands on all 4 sides of the ground although the clubhouse was extended in the 1980s. The barrel roof of the stand opposite the main stand was damaged in the great storm of 1987 and had to be removed. The club's financial issues of the late 80s and early 90s meant that ground maintenance suffered and the 2 stands at either end of the pitch became unsafe during this time and could not be used any more. The club played at this ground for 102 years before debts forced the sale of the ground for redevelopment in 1992. A housing estate has since been built on the site of the ground and is named Botany Close. No evidence of the ground exists today.

The club hoped to move into a new ground at Bartons Point in Sheerness and had council approval as well as plans in place for the new ground but this never materialised. Various other attempts to secure a ground on the island including a ground share with Sheppey RFC, ground share with Sheerness Steel FC as well as using the pitches at Minster Technical College and Seager Road plus purchasing land next to Sheppey RFC all fell through due to difficulty in obtaining planning permission or financial constraints. Consequently, Sheppey began a nomadic existence as tenants of a number of fellow Kent clubs.

=== Salters Lane ===
The first ground that Sheppey played at after leaving Botany Road was Faversham Town's ground, Salters Lane. It was here that the club won its first league title since the halcyon days of the 1970s. The ground had 2 large stands - one down one side of the ground, one at the car park end. It also had a clubhouse and small pavilion with seating and containing the changing rooms. The ground also had floodlights.

=== Kingsmead Stadium ===
When Sheppey left Salters Lane they moved into Canterbury City's Kingsmead Stadium as tenants of that club. The ground was a multi-sports arena with a greyhound/speedway track between the pitch and the main stand. The ground, like most at this level, had floodlights. There was hard standing on 3 sides of the ground when Sheppey played there but no cover apart from the main stand. The distance from the Isle Of Sheppey to Canterbury saw support dwindle and a return was sought to the Borough of Swale.

=== Central Park ===
Sheppey's final home ground before withdrawing from the Kent League in March 2001 and ceasing playing senior football for the first time in the club's history was at nearest neighbours Sittingbourne's Central Park stadium. Like Kingsmead, Central Park was a multi sports arena also hosting greyhound racing and speedway. The ground was a relatively new stadium as Sittingbourne had had it built after selling their Bull Ground home to a national supermarket chain. As well as the Main Stand there was open terracing at both ends of the ground.

=== Holm Place ===
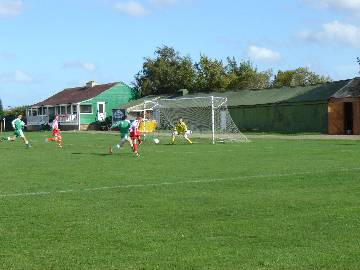
Holm Place showing the pavilion the club had access to.

When the Senior team were revived prior to the 2003–04 season the club made its home at Holm Place (this ground is opposite the current ground Holm Park and had been used by the youth teams the club had run since 2001). While the club had access to a modern clubhouse and parking at the ground the pitch itself, being a Sunday League pitch, was very basic with shared use of a pavilion, 2 dugouts and a rope fence around the pitch being all the development that it had. Despite there being no admission fee at Holm Place attendances rarely passed 20–30 at this time. The club did run a tea bar and also supplied a match program. Use of the separate clubhouse during and after games was available.

The ground had two pitches with Sheppey using the one closest to the entrance of the facility. On occasion, local Saturday League and re-arranged Sunday League games were played on the far pitch giving supporters the opportunity to watch two games at once if they so wished. Initially, the pitch wasn't roped off but, on promotion to Divisions One East of the KCL, this was added.

Little prospect of being promoted was likely as the pitch would have required permanent fencing around it, the ability to charge admission and hard standing on all 4 sides of the pitch. Floodlights would have also been required at some point with the prospect unlikely. The pavilion also needed major renovation and, as the club did not charge admission, the funding for this would have been difficult.

=== Oasis Academy ===
Sheppey did have an agreement to play home games at the Oasis Academy which has a floodlit 3G pitch until it was discovered that the pitch was smaller than the permitted size for the Kent County League and so Holm Place was retained as the club's home ground.

=== Holm Park ===
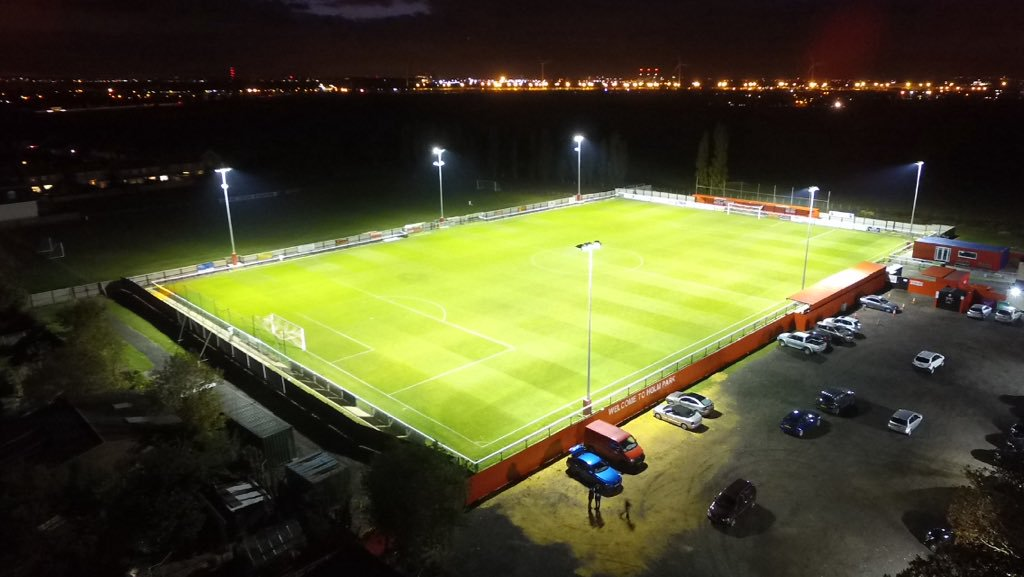
The Total Power Stadium – Holm Park

Sheppey's current ground is The Total Power Stadium – Holm Park which it moved into in April 2013. The ground is sited close to the Queenborough Road at Halfway on the Isle of Sheppey with the access road to the ground being opposite St Peter's Church. It had previously been the home of a number of Sheppey Sunday League sides including Canning Town and Sheerness Steel. By 2010 the ground had not been played on for a number of years and needed significant renovation. The directors of the club had secured a lease on the site – and subsequently ownership – prior to the club's withdrawal from the Kent County League in 2012–13. The pitch was brought up to Kent County League standard and major work was begun on the stadium facilities as well.

The original dugouts were replaced with new, modern dugouts. Hard standing was laid on all 4 sides of the pitch. New pitchside fencing was installed that meets the ground grading criteria for higher leagues. The clubhouse was completely renovated with 2 player changing rooms built, a match officials room and a physio room also being added to the ground floor. A club shop was also added. The top floor of the clubhouse contains a gallery bar added which, as of the start of the 2018–19 season, is now air-conditioned.

A player tunnel was installed before the 2017–18 season to meet ground grading requirements for Step 4 and above. A supporters bar – The Ites Bar – and a tea bar are also part of the ground now to improve the supporter experience.

Floodlights were installed at the ground in January 2015 and the pitch has been leveled and re-laid. With effect from the 2016/17 season, the seated capacity at Holm Park is 190, with undercover standing for a further 600 spectators. Season by season improvements now mean that there is cover on 3 sides of the ground and the pitch has been recognised as one of the best at its level in the country when Head Groundsman Roger Pullen was awarded a "Highly Commended" award by the Football Association in August 2018. Work done on the pitch includes initial levelling as the pitch was slightly sloped, laser levelling of the pitch and a drainage system and sprinklers being installed before the pitch was laid. The pitch is worked on every Summer in order to maintain the standard of it.

The stadium is one of the best-attended grounds at its level of football, with the club routinely placing in the top 10 attended clubs at step 5 for the whole of England. Popular sections of the ground for supporters are the Botany Road End and The Paddock. The all-seater main stand is named the Jim Grey Stand in memory of a longtime supporter of the club.

A toilet block at the Queenborough Road end of the ground has now been built and means the ground is now suitable for Step 4 football.

There are 3 more pitches at Holm Park including a 5-, 7- and 9-a-side pitches for the club's numerous youth teams.

As the club make their debut at Step 4 for the first time, the car park at the ground has been fully tarmacked and an additional tea bar by the Queenborough Road stand has been built.

== Support ==
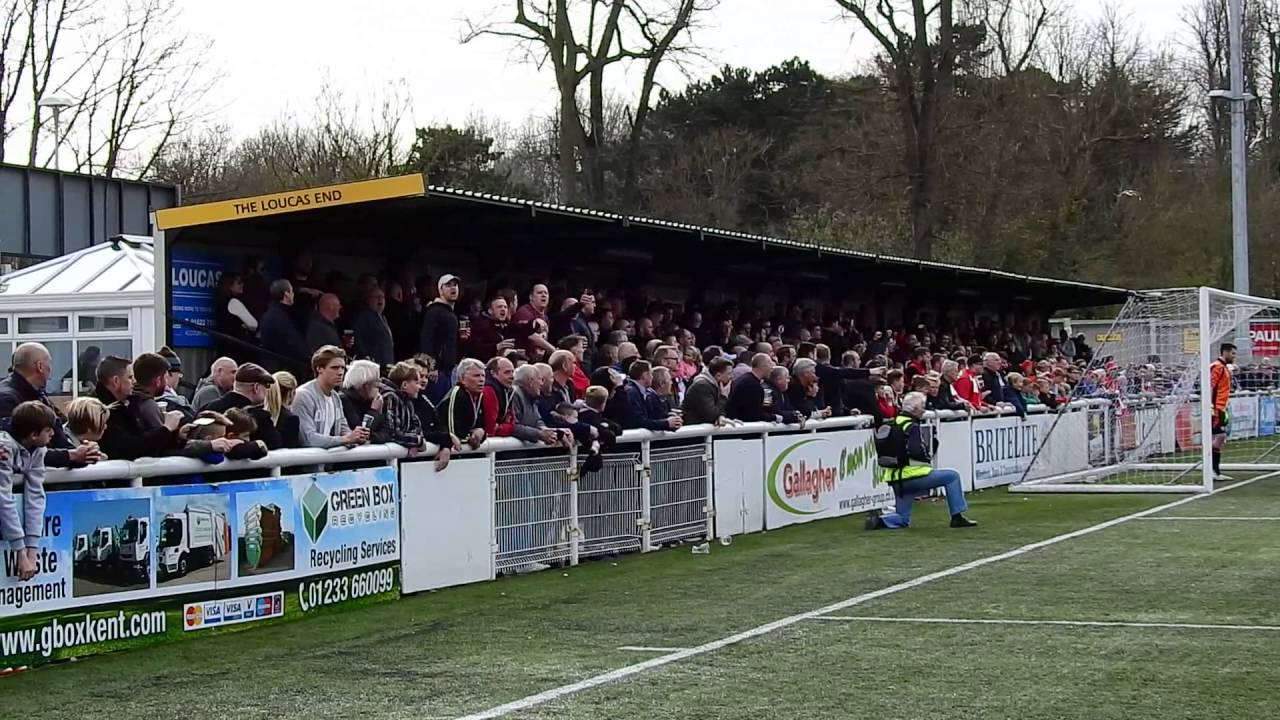
Sheppey United supporters at the 2016 Kent Senior Trophy Final

Since being reformed in 2010, Sheppey United have attracted their best support since the 1970s. Crowds of 250–300 are typical with attendances of 500+ not unheard of. The club set an attendance record for the Kent Invicta League of 718 for a game against Glebe. Sheppey supporters also follow their club away from home in increasing numbers and most of Sheppey's league rivals have their highest home attendance of the season when they host Sheppey. Such is the nature of Sheppey's away support that, on numerous occasions, the team hosting Sheppey have gone on their official social media accounts to praise it.

A growing rivalry with Sittingbourne has once again developed as Sheppey have progressed through the non-league pyramid to stand only 1 division below their oldest rivals as of the current season. As well as a revival of the Sittingbourne rivalry Sheppey United have developed good ties with the supporters of Ashford United, Fisher and Tunbridge Wells with supporters of each club often watching one of the other 3 clubs when their side is not playing.

The club's support is also known for the variety of its songs with songs about the club, current players, Sittingbourne and self-mocking songs appropriating insults that have been aimed at the residents of the Isle Of Sheppey by 'mainlanders' over the years among the fan's repertoire.

The club now have an independent supporter's association whose aim is to increase the number of people attending Sheppey games and working with the club to support its "Built from the community for the community" ethos.

== IteTV ==
The club announced in the Summer of 2018 that it would video all home matches from the 2018–19 season onward and then upload match highlights to the club's YouTube channel, IteTV. Interviews with the playing staff, management staff and promotional videos are also to be produced and uploaded to the channel too.

In preparation for the 2020/21 season, the club announced a partnership with Raise Your Game Sports Films to film the club's matches and to provide a highlights package to supporters as well as to live stream games if the club's games have to be played behind closed doors because of the COVID-19 pandemic.

== Staff ==
- Manager: Ian & George Batten
- Head Coach: Steve Aldridge
- Coach: Jamie Willis
- Goalkeeper Coach: Adam Wicketts
- General Manager: Lee Allen
- Kit: Lee Allen
- Analysis Assistant: Tyler Ross
- Physio: Sam Stone

== Players ==
=== Current squad ===
Correct as of 5 January 2024

Note: Flags indicate national team as defined under FIFA eligibility rules; some limited exceptions apply. Players may hold more than one non-FIFA nationality.

No.	Pos.	Nation	Player
1	GK		Aiden Prall
4	DF		Lekan Majoyegbe
7	MF		Danny Leonard

No.	Pos.	Nation	Player
9	FW		Dan Bradshaw
12	MF		Jacob Lambert
14	DF		Mamadou Diallo

== Honours ==
=== League honours ===
- Southern Football League Division Two
  - Runners-up (2): 1894–95, 1895–96
- Kent League
  - Champions (7): 1905–06, 1906–07, 1927–28^{+}, 1972–73, 1974–75, 1978–79, 1994–95
  - Runners-up (4): 1903–04, 1904–05, 1977–78, 1983–84
- Southern Counties East Football League Premier Division
  - Champions (1): 2021–22
- Greater London League Section B
  - Champions (1): 1964–65
- Kent Invicta League
  - Runners-up (1): 2015–16
- Kent County League Premier Division
  - Runners-up (1): 2013–14
- Kent County League Division One East
  - Runners-up (2): 2007–08, 2008–09
- Kent County League Division Two East
  - Runners-up (1): 2003–04

=== Cup honours ===
- Kent Senior Cup
  - Runners-up (3): 1926–27, 1928–29, 1931–32
- Kent Senior Trophy
  - Winners (3): 2015–16, 2019–20, 2021–22
  - Runners-up (1): 2017–18
- Kent League Cup
  - Winners (2): 1975–76, 1978–79
  - Runners-up (6): 1924–25, 1929–30, 1977–78, 1983–84, 1995–96, 1996–97
- Kent Senior Shield
  - Winners (1): 1977–78
- Kent Intermediate Shield
  - Winners (1): 2013–14
- SCEFL Challenge Cup
  - Winners (1): 2021–22
  - Runners-up (1): 2016–17
- Les Leckie Cup
  - Winners (1): 2005–06
  - Runners-up (1): 2007–08
- Kent League Junior Cup East
  - Winners (1): 2003–04
- Kent Amateur Cup
  - Winners (2): 1945–46, 1951–52
  - Runners-up (2): 1935–36, 1938–39
- Chatham and Rochester Charity Cup
  - Winners (2): 1892–93, 1905–06
- Sevenoaks Charity Cup Winners
  - Winners (1): 1895–96

^{+} Won by Reserves

== Records ==
- Highest League Position: 7th in 1897–98 Southern Football League (equivalent to 39th in the English league system)
- Best FA Cup performance: First round, 2023–24
- Best FA Amateur Cup performance: Third round, 1953–54
- Best FA Trophy performance: First round, 1985–86
- Best FA Vase performance: Third Round, 2018–19, 2021–22

== Notable former players ==
1. Players that have played/managed in the Football League or any foreign equivalent to this level (i.e. fully professional league).
2. Players with full international caps.
3. Players with notable achievements for the club.
- (England) Chris Wattis most clashes 3285
- (England) Matthew Benge all time top scorer 570 league goals
- (England) Ted Harper
- (England) Donald McCormick
- (England) Joseph Griffiths
- (England) Danny Shea
- (England) Jack Peters
- (England) Jim Mackey
- (England) Charlie Handley
- (England) Arthur Leonard
- (England) Mike Kelly
- (England) Herbert Chapman
- (England) Charles Cotton
- (Wales) Harry Trainer
- (England) Tommy Cain
- (England) Brian Diggins
- (England) Joe Craddock
- (England) Charles McGuigan
- (Morocco) Abdou El Kholti
- (Italy) Alessandro Zarrelli

== In popular culture ==
In 2014 Kelvin Hughes released a novel called "The Forgotten Footballer" in which the protagonist returns to Sheppey United, his first club, as manager after winning 3 league titles with Arsenal and playing for England 50 times shortly after completing a prison sentence.
