= Black Lane Temperance F.C. =

Defunct association football team

- Full name: Black Lane Temperance Football Club
- Nicknames: the Laners, the Teetotallers
- Founded: 1891
- Dissolved: 1906
- Ground: Cemetery Road
Home colours

Black Lane Temperance F.C. was an association football club from Radcliffe, near Bury, Lancashire.

== History ==
1910 Ordnance Survey map (Lancashire LXXXVII.16) showing Black Lane and the location of Temperance's ground

The club was founded in 1891 as an athletic sideline to the Temperance Movement, but the club soon distanced itself from the principle, although kept the name. It was a founder member of the Central Lancashire League in 1896, taking over fellow founder-member St Andrew's before the season's start.. The club won promotion from the second division after its first season, and took the title in 1897–98. That season it also reached the final of the Dr Parks Senior Cup, losing to Little Lever, an outcome repeated the following season.

The Laners took a second League title in 1900–01, but it was bittersweet, as the League collapsed before the next season, with the Laners being one of only four clubs (the others being Little Lever, Heywood United, and Bolton St Luke's) turning up to the annual general meeting. The club therefore joined the Bolton & District League as a stopgap, and in 1902 added to that membership of a much more senior league, the Lancashire Combination, in time for the 1902–03 season.

The club only lasted two seasons at this more senior level; it finished 10th (out of 18) in 1902–03, but the costs of this higher league however were crippling and, early in 1903, the club pushed hard for the revival of the Central Lancashire League, but eventually decided to eschew the competition to remain with the Combination. This also allowed the club to enter the Lancashire Senior Cup in 1903–04, but its first match - at St Helens Recs - was abandoned with the Laners 4–1 down, and the score was allowed to stand; Black Lane had turned up late, and with only 9 men.

The decision to stay in the Combination proved disastrous. Temperance finished bottom of the table, the total gate receipts for 1903–04 only amounted to £80, and, with such minimal local support, the club's committee did not want to risk going into significant debt, so the club withdrew.

The Laners therefore were accepted into the revived Central League in June 1904; and even then it resigned after a week, to play in the much lower-key Heaton Park League. By this time the club had already been accepted as a Senior Cup entrant, and, after walking over Glossop in the first qualifying round (after Glossop had a clash with a Football League fixture), it lost 10–3 at Nelson in the second.

The club at least finished the 1904–05 as champion of the Heaton League, and runner-up in the Parks Cup, but the last records for the club are of its participation in the Manchester Junior Cup in 1905–06.

=== FA Cup ===
The club played in the FA Cup qualifying rounds from 1901–02 to 1905–06, but lost every one of its ties. In 1901–02, after a first round bye, it was drawn at home to Rochdale Town, but sold home advantage; Marsden gave the Laners an early lead, but by half-time they were 2–1 down, and ultimately lost 7–2. It enjoyed two byes in 1903–04 to début in the competition in the third qualifying round the equivalent of the first round today; at that stage it went down 7–1 at Darwen, having held the home side to 1–1 at the break.

== Colours ==
The club originally wore blue. By 1902 it had adopted red and white shirts.

== Ground ==
The club's ground was off Cemetery Road, although it never seems to have had a formal name.

== Notable players ==
- Notable players ( 3 )
- Herbert Foster, goalkeeper in the early 1900s, later joined Leeds City.
- Robert Taylor, whom the club recruited from the junior side Willow Dale in 1899, and who moved to Everton in 1900; Taylor went on to play for the England national football team.
