= Alex Carter =

Alex Carter may refer to:

- Alex Carter (British actor) (born 1982), British actor
- Alex Carter (Canadian actor) (born 1963), Canadian television and film actor
- Alex Carter (cornerback) (born 1994), American football cornerback
- Alex Carter (defensive end) (born 1963), American football defensive end
- Alexander Carter (1909–2002), Canadian bishop
- Alex Carter (Neighbours), fictional character on Australian soap opera Neighbours

== See also ==
- Alexandra Carter (born 1987), Canadian voice actress
- Alexandra Carter (politician), English politician
- Al Carter (disambiguation)
