= Al Carter (disambiguation) =

Al Carter (born 1952) is a journalist.

Al Carter may also refer to:

- Al "Earthquake" Carter (1958–2021), boxer
- Al Carter (racing driver) in 2012 Pirelli World Challenge season

== See also ==
- Albert Carter (disambiguation)
- Alan Carter (disambiguation)
- Alfred Carter (disambiguation)
- Alex Carter (disambiguation)
