= Bob Taylor (footballer, born 1876) =

English footballer

Personal information
- Full name: Robert Taylor
- Date of birth: 1876
- Place of birth: Bolton, England
- Date of death: 1919 (aged 42–43)
- Position: Winger

Senior career*
Years	Team	Apps	(Gls)
1898–1899	Willow Dale		
1899–1900	Black Lane Temperance		
1900–1901	Everton	0	(0)
1901–1907	Bolton Wanderers	104	(18)
1907–1908	Atherton		
1908–1909	Bacup		
1909	Oswaldtwistle Rovers		
Total		104	(18)
- * Club domestic league appearances and goals

Robert Taylor (1876–1919) was an English footballer who played in the Football League for Bolton Wanderers with whom he played in the 1904 FA Cup Final.
