= Alan Carter =

Alan Carter may refer to:

- Alan Carter (civil servant) (1929−2016), British and Hong Kong immigration official
- Alan Carter (dancer) (1920−2009), English ballet dancer, choreographer and ballet master
- Alan Carter (director) (born 1959), an American television director, writer, producer, and editor
- Alan Carter (motorcyclist) (born 1964), English Grand Prix motorcycle racer
- Alan Carter (philosopher) (born 1952), professor of philosophy at the University of Glasgow
- General Alan Carter, fictional character in the 1966 film Fantastic Voyage
- Alan Carter (Space: 1999), fictional character in the TV series Space: 1999
- Rags Carter (1928–1993), American racing driver

== See also ==
- Al Carter (disambiguation)
