= James Nightingale (Scottish footballer) =

Scottish footballer

Personal information
- Date of birth: 1881
- Place of birth: Edinburgh, Scotland
- Position: Defender

Senior career*
Years	Team	Apps	(Gls)
- Bolton St Luke's
- Bolton Wanderers
- Rochdale Town
- Southport Central
1904-1906	Rossendale United	48	(0)
1905–1906	Bradford City	10	(0)
Total		58+	(0+)
- * Club domestic league appearances and goals

James Nightingale (born 1881) was a Scottish professional footballer who played as a back.

== Career ==
Born in Edinburgh, Nightingale spent his early career with Bolton St Luke's, Bolton Wanderers, Rochdale Town, Southport Central and Rossendale United. He joined Bradford City November 1905, making 10 league appearances, before being released in 1906.

== Sources ==
- Frost, Terry (1988). Bradford City A Complete Record 1903-1988. Breedon Books Sport. ISBN 0-907969-38-0.
- Rogan, David (2021). Rossendale United Football Club 1898-2011 A season by season History. Grosvenor Sport. ISBN 978-1-83975-708-2.
