= Bill Cartwright (footballer, born 1884) =

English footballer

Personal information
- Full name: William Cartwright
- Date of birth: 24 June 1884
- Place of birth: Burton upon Trent, England
- Date of death: Unknown
- Position: Full back

Senior career*
Years	Team	Apps	(Gls)
1906–1907	Gainsborough Trinity	59	(4)
1908–1912	Chelsea	44	(0)
1913	Tottenham Hotspur	17	(0)
	Swansea Town	?	(?)
	Gillingham	?	(?)
- * Club domestic league appearances and goals

William Cartwright (24 June 1884 in Burton upon Trent – ?) was a professional footballer who played for Gainsborough Trinity, Chelsea, Tottenham Hotspur, Swansea Town and Gillingham.

== Football career ==
Cartwright began his career at Gainsborough Trinity. He featured in 59 matches and scored four goals between 1906 and 1907, before joining Chelsea. The full back played 44 matches between 1908 and 1912 for the Stamford Bridge club. In 1913 he signed for Tottenham Hotspur and made his debut against Newcastle United on 15 November 1913 and featured in 19 matches in all competitions for the Lilywhites. After leaving White Hart Lane he played for Swansea Town and finally Gillingham.
