= Alfred Carter (cricketer) =

Australian cricketer

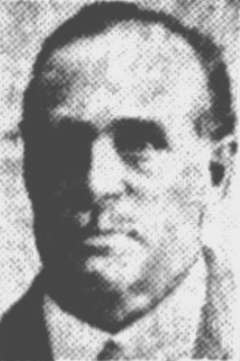

Personal information
- Full name: Alfred Snowden Carter
- Born: 1 March 1869; Boroondara, Victoria, Australia
- Died: 7 June 1920 (aged 51); Camberwell, Victoria, Australia

Domestic team information
- Years: Team
- 1899-1900: Victoria
- Source: Cricinfo, 27 July 2015

Alf Carter

Personal information
- Full name: Alfred Snowden Carter
- Born: 1 March 1869; Boroondara, Victoria, Australia
- Died: 7 June 1920 (aged 51); Camberwell, Victoria, Australia

Playing career^{1}
Years	Club	Games (Goals)
1888–1892	Essendon (VFA)	
- ^{1} Playing statistics correct to the end of 1892.

Alfred Snowden Carter (1 March 1869 – 7 June 1920) was an Australian rules footballer who played for the Essendon Football Club in the Victorian Football Association (VFA) from 1888 to 1892, and an Australian cricketer, who played two first-class cricket matches for Victoria between 1899 and 1900.

He also played cricket for the East Melbourne Cricket Club, scoring more than 9,800 runs for the team.

== Early life ==
The youngest son of the Melbourne surgeon-dentist, Ernest Carter (1829-1889), and Harriet Elizabeth Carter (1828-1914), née Gilks, Alfred Snowden Carter and his twin sister, Ethel, were born at Booroondara, Victoria on 1 March 1869. He was educated at Kew High School.

== Football ==
=== Essendon (VFA) ===
Carter began his sporting career playing Australian Rules Football for the Essendon Football Club in 1887. He was the team's leading goal-kicker in 1888 and 1889.

=== "Driver" ===
His father refused to grant him permission to play, and, as a consequence, he assumed the surname "Driver" while representing the Essendon club over the first four seasons he played for them.

In his fifth and last season with Essendon, he was listed as "Carter".

== Cricket ==
A left-handed bat, he began playing district cricket in the 1880's initially playing for University before moving to East Melbourne in 1890 and he was selected to represent Victoria twice in matches against Tasmania. He was also a baseballer and in 1897 he was selected to represent Australia on a baseball tour of America.

== Other sports ==
In 1897 he toured America as a member of the Australian baseball team.

Later in life Carter was successful in golf, winning the Eaglemont golf championship in 1910, skittles, becoming the Victorian amateur skittle champion in 1916, and bowls taking the sport up in 1918.

== Death ==
He died, at a private hospital in Camberwell, Victoria, on 7 June 1920.

== See also ==
- List of Victoria first-class cricketers
