= Robert Buchanan (footballer, born 1887) =

Scottish footballer

Personal information
- Date of birth: 1887
- Place of birth: Bellshill, Scotland
- Position: Full back

Senior career*
Years	Team	Apps	(Gls)
- Bellshill Athletic
1911–1913	Chelsea	3	(0)
1913–?	Southend United		
1919–1920	Gillingham	19	(0)
- * Club domestic league appearances and goals

Robert Buchanan (born 1887) was a Scottish professional footballer active either side of the First World War. Prior to the war, he played for Chelsea, where he made three Football League appearances. He later played for Southend United and Gillingham, where he was a regular during the 1919–20 season.
