= Alfred Carter (footballer) =

English footballer

Personal information
- Full name: Alfred Burton Carter
- Date of birth: 20 October 1877
- Place of birth: Basford, England
- Date of death: 1960 (aged 82–83)
- Position: Inside forward

Senior career*
Years	Team	Apps	(Gls)
1895–1896	Newstead Byron		
1896–1899	Notts County	20	(5)
1899–1900	Kettering		
1900	Newstead Byron		
Total		20	(5)
- * Club domestic league appearances and goals

Alfred Burton Carter (20 October 1877 – 1960) was an English footballer who played in the Football League for Notts County.
