= Archie Roe =

English association football player

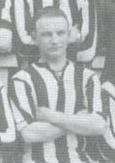

Personal information
- Full name: Archibald Roe
- Date of birth: 9 December 1893
- Place of birth: Hull, England
- Date of death: 17 October 1947 (aged 53)
- Place of death: Wigan, England
- Height: 5 ft 8 in (1.73 m)
- Position: Centre forward

Senior career*
Years	Team	Apps	(Gls)
1914–1918	The Wednesday	0	(0)
1918–1919	South Shields	2	(1)
1919–1920	Birmingham	3	(0)
1920–1921	Gillingham	16	(2)
1921–1922	Castleford Town		
1922–1923	Arsenal	4	(1)
1923–1924	Lincoln City	27	(12)
1924–1925	Rotherham County	7	(3)
- * Club domestic league appearances and goals

Archibald Roe (9 December 1893 – 17 October 1947) was an English professional footballer who scored 19 goals in 59 appearances in the Football League playing for South Shields, Birmingham, Gillingham, Arsenal, Lincoln City and Rotherham County. He played as a centre forward.

== Career ==
Roe was born in Hull, in the East Riding of Yorkshire. He began his football career with The Wednesday before the First World War, but never appeared for the first team. When competitive football resumed after the war, Roe joined South Shields, newly elected to the Second Division. He scored their first goal in the Football League, the only goal of the home game against Birmingham on 1 September 1919. Roe must have impressed his opponents, because he signed for them a few weeks later having played only twice in the league for South Shields. The Sports Argus' report of his Birmingham debut describes him as "about the most prominent member of the home front line ... in evidence in every attack carried out by Birmingham." Nevertheless, he played only three first-team games in his only season at the club.

Roe spent the next season in the Third Division with Gillingham, where he found more playing time but few goals, scoring twice from 16 league appearances. In 1921 he dropped into non-League football with Midland League side Castleford Town. His performances with Castleford earned him a move a year later back to the Football League with Arsenal. Though he only played four First Division games for the club, he scored freely for their reserve team.

In November 1923 Roe completed his tour of the Football League divisions when he signed for Lincoln City of the Third Division North. Although he joined well after the start of the season, he still became their leading scorer for 1923–24; described as "hard as nails despite only being of moderate height", he scored 12 goals from 30 games in all competitions in the year he spent with the club. His last move was to Rotherham County, where the "fearless" Roe's three goals from seven games – one on his debut and two more in his next three games – failed to prevent the club finishing bottom of the Third Division North.

After retiring from the game, Roe became a publican in Sheffield. He died while visiting family in Wigan, Lancashire, in 1947 at the age of 53.
