= Len Ramsell =

English footballer

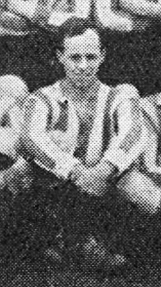
- Ramsell with Brentford in 1928.

Personal information
- Full name: Leonard Thomas Ramsell
- Date of birth: 20 August 1897
- Place of birth: Gillingham, England
- Date of death: 24 December 1975 (aged 78)
- Place of death: Sunninghill, England
- Position: Inside left

Senior career*
| Years | Team | Apps | (Gls) |
- Royal Garrison Artillery
| 1919–1920 | Gillingham | 9 | (1) |
| –1924 | Chatham Town | | |
| 1924–1925 | Gillingham | 10 | (2) |
| 1925– | Chatham Town | | |
| 1928–1929 | Brentford | 0 | (0) |
- * Club domestic league appearances and goals

Leonard Thomas Ramsell (20 August 1897 – 24 December 1975) was an English footballer who played in the Football League for Gillingham as an inside left.

== Personal life ==
In July 1930, Richmond took over the license of the Ye Olde Anchor pub in Twickenham.

== Career statistics ==
Appearances and goals by club, season and competition
| Club | Season | League | | | FA Cup | | Total | |
| Club | Season | Division | Apps | Goals | Apps | Goals | Apps | Goals |
|---|---|---|---|---|---|---|---|---|
| Gillingham | 1919–20 | Southern League First Division | 9 | 0 | 4 | 1 | 13 | 1 |
| Gillingham | 1924–25 | Third Division South | 10 | 2 | 1 | 0 | 11 | 2 |
| Gillingham | Total | | 19 | 2 | 5 | 1 | 24 | 3 |
| Career total | | | 19 | 2 | 5 | 1 | 24 | 3 |
