= Ernest Ollerenshaw =

English footballer

Ernest Ollerenshaw (11 April 1893 – 2 November 1963) was an English professional footballer of the 1920s. Born in Hollingworth, Hyde, Cheshire, he joined Gillingham from Manchester City in 1920, but only made one appearance for the club in The Football League.
