= Bobby Beale (footballer) =

English footballer

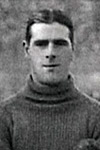

Personal information
- Full name: Robert Hughes Beale
- Date of birth: 8 January 1884
- Place of birth: Maidstone, Kent, England
- Date of death: 5 October 1950 (aged 66)
- Place of death: Dymchurch, Kent, England
- Height: 5 ft 11 in (1.80 m)
- Position: Goalkeeper

Senior career*
Years	Team	Apps	(Gls)
?–1905	Maidstone United		
1905–1908	Brighton & Hove Albion	10	(0)
1908–1912	Norwich City		
1912–1919	Manchester United	105	(0)
1915–1916	→ Arsenal (guest)		
1919–1920	Gillingham	12	(0)
1920–1921	Maidstone United		
1921	Manchester United	0	(0)
- * Club domestic league appearances and goals

Robert Hughes Beale (8 January 1884 – 5 October 1950) was an English footballer who played as a goalkeeper. Born in Maidstone, Kent, he played in the Southern League for Brighton & Hove Albion and Norwich City before joining Football League side Manchester United in 1912. After the First World War, he returned to the Southern League with Gillingham.

== Career ==
Born in Maidstone, Kent, Beale began his career with his hometown club, Maidstone United, in the early 20th century. In 1905, he signed for Brighton & Hove Albion, before moving to Norwich City three years later. In May 1912, he was signed by Manchester United for £275. He made 105 appearances for the club in The Football League, and played once for the Football League XI in an inter-league representative match, but his career in The Football League was ended by the First World War.

When competitive football resumed, he joined Gillingham of the Southern Football League. He began the 1919–20 season as the club's first-choice goalkeeper, but lost his place after 12 games and eventually returned to his first club, Maidstone United. Beale's son, Walter, also had a career as a footballer and signed for his father's former club, Manchester United, in May 1938, however he never played for the first team.
