= Clive Wigmore =

English footballer

Cuthbert "Clive" Wigmore (1892 – 24 February 1969) was an English professional association footballer of the 1920s. Born in Worksop, he joined Gillingham from Aston Villa in 1920 and went on to make nine appearances for the club in The Football League.
