= Andy Holt (1910s and 1920s footballer) =

English footballer

Arnold Andrew Holt was an English professional footballer in the 1920s.

Born in Sheffield, he joined Gillingham from Chesterfield Municipal in August 1920 and went on to make six appearances for the club in The Football League. He left to join Mansfield Town in November 1920.
