= Billy Bower =

English footballer

Personal information
- Full name: William Bower
- Date of birth: 18 September 1887
- Place of birth: Dalston, England
- Date of death: February 1954 (aged 66)
- Height: 6 ft 0 in (1.83 m)
- Position: Goalkeeper

Senior career*
Years	Team	Apps	(Gls)
- Peel Institute
1905–1914	Clapton Orient	171	(0)
- Gillingham
- * Club domestic league appearances and goals

William Bower (18 September 1887 – February 1954) was an English footballer. He started his career with Peel Institute where he played football and cricket. He later played in the Football League for Clapton Orient, and later with New Brompton. He became their trainer / manager in 1921, and in 1947, their groundsman.
