= Tom Sisson =

English footballer

Thomas Sisson (19 October 1894 – 1976) was an English professional footballer. He briefly played for Notts County before the First World War and went on to play for Gillingham and Lincoln City between 1919 and 1926.
