= Trevett Read =

English footballer

Trevett William Read (9 February 1893 – 1976) was an English professional footballer. He joined Gillingham in 1919 as a goalkeeper after serving in the Royal Navy and made two appearances in the Southern League in the 1919–20 season. After the club was elected to The Football League in 1920, he did not play again until he made a solitary appearance in 1924. He conceded five goals in a defeat to Millwall and never played for the club's first team again.
