= Tommy Hall (footballer, born 1891) =

English footballer

Personal information
- Full name: Thomas Hall
- Date of birth: 4 September 1891
- Place of birth: Newburn, Northumberland, England
- Position: Inside forward

Senior career*
Years	Team	Apps	(Gls)
1909–1913	Sunderland	29	(10)
1913–1920	Newcastle United	54	(15)
1920–1926	Gillingham	190	(47)
- * Club domestic league appearances and goals

Thomas Hall (4 September 1891 – after 1926) was an English footballer who played professionally as an inside forward for Sunderland, Newcastle United and Gillingham, for whom he made 190 Football League appearances. He retired in 1926 to become the Kent club's trainer.
