= John Waugh (footballer, born 1892) =

Scottish footballer

John Waugh (born 10 May 1892) was a Scottish professional footballer. Born in Slamannan, Waugh began his professional career with one match for Sunderland in the 1913–14 season. After the First World War he joined Dundee Hibernian before returning to England in 1920 to play for Gillingham. He made 60 appearances in the English Football League for the Kent club before joining Darlington, but he made no appearances for the latter club and appears to have subsequently left the professional game.
