= Tom Thompson (footballer, born 1894) =

English footballer

Thomas Norman Thompson (born 1894) was an English professional footballer. He played for Sunderland and Gillingham between 1919 and 1924, making over 70 appearances in the Football League.
