= George Russell (footballer, born 1893) =

English footballer

Personal information
- Full name: George Thomas Russell
- Date of birth: 7 July 1893
- Place of birth: Chatham, Kent
- Position: Outside right

Senior career*
Years	Team	Apps	(Gls)
1920–1921	Gillingham	3	(0)
- * Club domestic league appearances and goals

George Thomas Russell (7 July 1893, in Chatham, Kent – ?) was an English football player of the 1920s who played professionally for Gillingham. He made three Football League appearances.
