= Tom Baxter (footballer, born 1893) =

English footballer

Tom Baxter pictured in 1920

Thomas James C. Baxter (born 1893) was an English professional footballer of the 1920s. Born in Wandsworth, he joined Gillingham from Chelsea in 1920 and went on to make 19 appearances for the club in The Football League.
