= George Needham (footballer) =

English footballer

Personal information
- Full name: George Wright Needham
- Date of birth: 28 April 1894
- Place of birth: Staveley, England
- Date of death: 30 March 1967 (aged 72)
- Place of death: Banbury, England
- Position: Half-back

Senior career*
Years	Team	Apps	(Gls)
?	Sherwood Foresters		
?–1919	Staveley		
1919–1920	Derby County	5	(0)
1920–1924	Gillingham	122	(13)
1924–1925	Northampton Town	35	(1)
1925–?	Worksop Town		
- * Club domestic league appearances and goals

George Wright Needham (28 April 1894 – 30 March 1967) was an English professional footballer who played for clubs including Derby County, Northampton Town, and Gillingham, for whom he made over 120 Football League appearances.
