= Wally Battiste =

English footballer

Personal information
- Full name: Walter Battiste
- Date of birth: 11 June 1892
- Place of birth: Worksop, England
- Date of death: 25 December 1965
- Place of death: Windermere, England
- Position: Outside right

Senior career*
Years	Team	Apps	(Gls)
- Worksop Town
- Shirebrook
1919–1920	Grimsby Town	31	(0)
1920–1924	Gillingham	149	(8)
1924–1928	Millwall	43	(5)
1930–1931	Gillingham	3	(0)
1931–?	Sittingbourne		
- Aylesford Paper Mills
- * Club domestic league appearances and goals as of 15 August 2007

Walter Battiste (born Worksop, 11 June 1892, died Windermere, 25 December 1965) was an English footballer who played professionally for Grimsby Town, Millwall and most notably for Gillingham, where he made over 150 Football League appearances.
