= Thomas Robinson (footballer) =

English footballer

Thomas James Douglas Robinson (14 September 1893 – 27 May 1951) was an English professional footballer of the 1920s. Born in Liverpool, he joined Gillingham from Everton in 1920 and went on to make two appearances for the club in The Football League, scoring one goal.
