= Harry Dawson (Gaelic footballer) =

Irish Gaelic footballer

Personal information
- Native name: Anraí Ó Dawsúin (Irish)
- Born: 28 March 1992 (age 34) Dublin, Ireland
- Height: 6 ft 1 in (185 cm)

Sport
- Sport: Gaelic football
- Position: Corner forward
Club
- Years: Club
- Skerries Harps GAA
Inter-county
- Years: County
- 2012-: Dublin
Inter-county titles
- Leinster titles: 1
- All-Irelands: 0
- All Stars: 0

Harry Dawson (born 28 March 1992) is a Gaelic football player who plays inter-county football with Dublin and club football for Skerries Harps GAA. Harry attended Skerries Community College and is currently studying Retail Management at Dublin Institute of Technology.

== Minor/U21 ==
Harry was part of the Dublin Minor Football team in 2009 and 2010. He was used mainly as a sub in 2009 but in 2010 he formed part of a formidable Dublin attack with Ciarán Kilkenny. The team faced Kildare at the Leinster quarter finals stage. In this game Dawson scored 1-7 however the game was drawn and Kildare eventually won after 2 replays.

Dawson was part of the Dublin U-21 panel which were knocked out of the 2011 All-Ireland Under 21 Football Championship at the first round stage.

In 2012 Dawson was used as an impact substitution in the 2012 All-Ireland Under 21 Football Championship. Dublin won this Championship with a 2–12 to 0–11 win over Roscommon with Dawson performing well from the bench,

== Dublin Senior Team ==
Dawson has been included by new Dublin manager Jim Gavin in his first few provisional squads for the 2013 season.

== College ==
Dawson has been part of the DIT Senior Football team for their 2011, 2012 and 2013 O'Byrne Cup Campaigns.

== Club ==
Dawson is an integral member of the Skerries Harps GAA Senior Football team. In 2009 he was the star player of the minor team which won the clubs first Dublin Minor Championship (D) in 20 years. In 2011 he was part of the team which won the Dublin Intermediate Football Championship. In a tight match against Cuala GAA. In this game Dawson scored a last minute free to give Skerries a 1–11 to 1–10 win.
