= Harry Lee (footballer, born 1887) =

English footballer

Personal information
- Full name: Henry Lee
- Date of birth: 1887
- Place of birth: Preston, England
- Height: 5 ft 8 in (1.73 m)
- Positions: Centre forward; outside right

Senior career*
Years	Team	Apps	(Gls)
–1905	Moor Parts		
1905–1906	Leyland		
1906–1907	St Helens Recreation		
1907–1908	Fulham	7	(2)
1909–1912	Reading		
1912–1919	Fulham	58	(30)
1919–1920	Gillingham	22	(4)
- Chorley
- * Club domestic league appearances and goals

Henry Lee was an English professional footballer who played as a forward in the Football League for Fulham.

== Personal life ==
Lee worked at Dick, Kerr & Co. in Preston during the First World War.

== Career statistics ==
Appearances and goals by club, season and competition
Club	Season	League			FA Cup		Total	
Club	Season	Division	Apps	Goals	Apps	Goals	Apps	Goals
Fulham	1914–15	Second Division	25	16	0	0	25	16
Gillingham	1919–20	Southern League First Division	22	4	3	0	25	4
Career total			47	20	3	0	50	20
