= Joseph Griffiths =

English footballer

Joseph A. Griffiths was an English professional footballer of the 1920s. He joined Gillingham in 1920 and played for the club in the Southern League. After the club was elected to The Football League in 1920, however, he played only five more games before leaving to join Sheppey United in 1921, where he linked up with another player who had failed to make the transition to the higher level, Donald McCormick.
