= Tom Gilbey (footballer) =

English footballer

- Gilbey in Gillingham colours in 1920

Personal information
- Full name: Thomas Edmund Gilbey
- Date of birth: 20 January 1898
- Place of birth: Bishop Auckland, England
- Date of death: 1962 (aged 63–64)
- Place of death: Bishop Auckland, England
- Position: Striker

Senior career*
Years	Team	Apps	(Gls)
?–1920	Darlington		
1920–?	Gillingham	11	(6)
- * Club domestic league appearances and goals

Thomas Edmund Gilbey (20 January 1898 – 1962) was an English footballer who played professionally for Gillingham. Although he only made 11 Football League appearances for the Kent-based club, he was notable for scoring the Gills' first ever league goal, against Southampton in August 1920.
