= Jock Robertson =

English footballer

- Robertson pictured on a cigarette card

Personal information
- Full name: James Walter Robertson
- Date of birth: 21 February 1898
- Place of birth: Chatham, England
- Date of death: 29 December 1970 (aged 72)
- Place of death: Rochester, England
- Position: Defender

Senior career*
Years	Team	Apps	(Gls)
19??–1919	Chatham Centrals		
1919–1933	Gillingham	365	(1)
1933–19??	Canterbury Waverley		
- * Club domestic league appearances and goals

James Walter "Jock" Robertson (21 February 1898 – 29 December 1970) was an English association footballer who played professionally for Gillingham. He joined the club while it was still playing non-league football and went on to set a club record for the most matches played in the Football League, making over 350 appearances.

== Career ==
Robertson was born in Chatham and shortly after the First World War played for local team Chatham Centrals. Upon his demobilisation from the Army in November 1919 he signed for professional club Gillingham, at the time playing in the Southern League, but had to wait until the following April to make his debut for the team, which came in an away match against Southend United. He played in seven of the team's final eight matches of the season.

At the end of the 1919–20 season, the Southern League Division One was absorbed into the Football League to form the new Third Division, and Robertson played in the club's first ever Football League match against Southampton on 28 August 1920. Over the next thirteen seasons he made over 350 Football League appearances, a club record which stood for over 30 years. At the end of the 1932–33 season he left Priestfield Road to join non-league club Canterbury Waverley. Details of his career beyond that point are unknown. He died in Rochester in 1970.

== Career statistics ==
Appearances and goals by club, season and competition
Club	Season	League			FA Cup		Total	
Club	Season	Division	Apps	Goals	Apps	Goals	Apps	Goals
Gillingham	1919–20	Southern League Division One	7	0	0	0	7	0
Gillingham	1920–21	Football League Third Division	41	0	3	0	44	0
Gillingham	1921–22	Football League Third Division South	27	0	2	0	29	0
Gillingham	1922–23	Football League Third Division South	35	0	2	0	37	0
Gillingham	1923–24	Football League Third Division South	28	0	4	0	32	0
Gillingham	1924–25	Football League Third Division South	38	0	7	0	45	0
Gillingham	1925–26	Football League Third Division South	42	0	2	0	44	0
Gillingham	1926–27	Football League Third Division South	36	0	4	0	40	0
Gillingham	1927–28	Football League Third Division South	30	1	3	0	33	1
Gillingham	1928–29	Football League Third Division South	32	0	2	0	34	0
Gillingham	1929–30	Football League Third Division South	30	0	1	0	31	0
Gillingham	1930–31	Football League Third Division South	16	0	0	0	16	0
Gillingham	1931–32	Football League Third Division South	2	0	0	0	2	0
Gillingham	1932–33	Football League Third Division South	1	0	0	0	1	0
Career totals			365	1	30	0	395	1
