= Donald McCormick (footballer) =

English footballer

Donald McCormick was an English professional footballer of the 1920s. He joined Gillingham in 1919 and played for the club in the Southern League. After the club was elected to The Football League in 1920, however, he only played once more before leaving to join Sheppey United in 1921, where he linked up with another player who had failed to make the transition to the higher level, Joseph Griffiths.
