= George Collins (footballer) =

English football manager

Personal information
- Place of birth: England

Managerial career
- Years: Team
- 1919–1920: Gillingham
- 1933–1936: Darlington

George Collins was an English football manager. He managed Gillingham from 1919 to 1920, and Darlington from 1933 to 1936. There is no record of him having played football at a professional level.

== Honours ==
Darlington

- Third Division (North) Cup: 1933–34
- Third Division (North) Cup runner-up: 1935–36

== Managerial stats ==
Team	Nat	From	To	Record				
Team	Nat	From	To	G	W	L	D	Win %
Gillingham	(England)	August 1919	May 1920	47	11	10	26	23.40
Darlington	(England)	August 1933	October 1936	139	55	57	27	39.6
