= Syd Gore =

English footballer

Gore pictured in 1920

Sydney Percy Gore (born 23 September 1900, date of death unknown) was an English professional football player of the interwar years. Born in Faversham, he joined Gillingham from Faversham Rangers in 1918 and made eight appearances for the club in the Football League before leaving to join Sittingbourne. He joined Millwall in 1923 and made over 100 appearances over three seasons. After a spell with Chatham Town he rejoined Gillingham in 1929 and made a further 32 appearances. His last known club was Ashford Town.
