= Albert Carter (footballer) =

English footballer

Albert James Carter (1898–?) was an English professional association football player of the 1920s. He joined Gillingham from a minor club called Zion in 1920 and went on to make two appearances for the club in The Football League.
