= Arthur Wood (footballer, born 1890) =

English footballer

- Wood pictured in Gillingham colours

Personal information
- Full name: Arthur Basil Wood
- Date of birth: 8 May 1890
- Place of birth: Southampton
- Date of death: 17 January 1977 (aged 86)
- Place of death: Merton
- Height: 5 ft 8 in (1.73 m)
- Position: Forward

Senior career*
Years	Team	Apps	(Gls)
- Fulham
1919–1922	Gillingham	80	(23)
- Hamilton Academical
- Newport County
	Queens Park Rangers	20	
- * Club domestic league appearances and goals

Arthur Basil Wood (8 May 1890 – 17 January 1977) was an English footballer. He played professionally for clubs including Gillingham, Fulham and Queens Park Rangers between 1911 and 1925, and made over 100 appearances in The Football League. He also fought in the First World War.

== Career ==
Born in Southampton, Wood began his career with local clubs St Mary's Athletic and Eastleigh Athletic before joining Fulham in 1911. He made over twenty first team appearances for the club over the next three years, playing as either an inside forward or centre forward, but only scored one goal. His playing career was interrupted by the First World War, in which he saw active service. During the war he suffered an injury which necessitated the insertion of a metal plate into his forehead. This meant that, although he was able to resume his football career after the war, he was never again able to head the ball.

In August 1919 Wood resumed his playing career when he signed for Gillingham, then of the Southern Football League. In his first season with the club, he was top scorer with fourteen goals. At the end of the 1919–20 season, the club was elected into the Football League Third Division, and Wood went on to make 49 appearances for the "Gills" at this level. He left Gillingham in 1922 and had a short spell with Scottish club Hamilton Academical before returning to The Football League with Newport County, for whom he played 12 times. His final professional club was Queens Park Rangers, for whom he made twenty appearances but without scoring a goal. After retiring from professional football he worked at the Regent Palace Hotel and played for the hotel's staff football team. He died in Merton in 1977, aged 86.
