= Harry Dawson (association footballer) =

English footballer

Personal information
- Full name: Harold Dawson
- Date of birth: Q1 1886
- Place of birth: Bolton, Lancashire, England
- Position: Outside left

Youth career
- Bolton St Luke's
- 1905–1906: Atherton Church House

Senior career*
Years	Team	Apps	(Gls)
1906–1908	Rossendale United	74	(14)
1908–1909	Everton	4	(0)
1909–1911	Blackpool	26	(4)
1911	West Ham United	10	(1)
1911–1912	Croydon Common	17	(4)
1912–1913	West Ham United	22	(3)
1913–1916	Croydon Common	10	(0)
1920	Gillingham	2	(0)
- * Club domestic league appearances and goals

Harold Dawson (born 1886) was an English professional footballer. An outside left, he played in the Football League for Everton and Blackpool.

== Career ==
After a spell at Croydon Common, Dawson played his first Southern League First Division game for West Ham United on 16 March 1912, against Luton Town. He scored on his home debut a week later, against Bristol Rovers. He scored his second goal for West Ham in the first game of the 1912–13 season, against Exeter City, and his third and final goal for the club also came against West Country opposition when he scored against Plymouth Argyle on 5 October 1912. The last of his 22 appearances came against Merthyr Town on 18 January 1913. He returned to Croydon Common thereafter.
