= List of Gillingham F.C. players (1–24 appearances) =

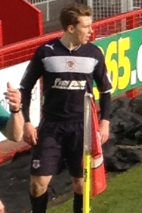
Luke Freeman set multiple records when he played for Gillingham at the age of 15.

Gillingham Football Club is an English professional association football club based in Gillingham, Kent, playing in EFL League Two, the fourth level of the English football league system, as of the 2025–26 season. The club was formed in 1893 as New Brompton F.C., changing its name to Gillingham in 1912. The club joined The Football League in 1920, was voted out of the league in favour of Ipswich Town at the end of the 1937–38 season, but returned to the league 12 years later after it was expanded from 88 to 92 clubs. Between 2000 and 2005, Gillingham played in the second tier of English football for the only time in the club's history, achieving a highest league finish of eleventh place in 2002–03. The club's first team have competed in numerous nationally and regionally organised competitions, and all players who have played between 1 and 24 such matches, either as a member of the starting eleven or as a substitute, are listed below.

Several players have contributed significantly to the history of the club, despite playing relatively few games. Tom Gilbey scored the club's first goal in The Football League on the opening day of the 1920–21 season. In 2007, Luke Freeman set records as both the youngest player ever to represent the club and the youngest player ever to play for any club in the rounds proper (i.e. excluding the qualifying rounds) of the FA Cup, aged 15. Glenn Roeder made seven appearances during a one-season spell as player-manager in the 1992–93 season, in which the "Gills" narrowly avoided finishing bottom of The Football League and being relegated into non-League football. Tony Pulis, who played 17 times for the club in the 1989–90 season, would return as manager in 1995 and lead the club to promotion from the Football League Third Division. Players who made few appearances for Gillingham but achieved greater success outside football include Les Ames and Laurie Fishlock, both of whom played Test cricket for England, and Billy Ivison, who played rugby league for Great Britain.

All players who have played between 1 and 24 first-team matches for the club, either as a member of the starting eleven or as a substitute, are listed below. Each player's details include the duration of his career with Gillingham, his typical playing position while with the club, and the number of matches played and goals scored in all senior competitive matches.

== Key ==
- The list is ordered first by number of appearances, and then date of debut.
- Appearances as a substitute are included. This feature of the game was introduced in The Football League at the start of the 1965–66 season.
- Statistics are correct up to the end of the 2025–26 season.

Positions key
Pre-1960s		1960s–	
GK	Goalkeeper		
FB	Full back	DF	Defender
HB	Half back	MF	Midfielder
FW	Forward		

Nationality
Unless otherwise noted, the nationality of a player is determined by the country/countries for which he has played international football, or if the player has not played international football, his country of birth.
Position
Playing positions are listed according to the tactical formations that were employed at the time. Thus the change in the names of defensive and midfield positions reflects the tactical evolution that occurred from the 1960s onwards.
Club career
Club career is defined as the first and last calendar years in which the player appeared for the club in any of the competitions listed below.
Total appearances and Total goals
Total appearances and goals comprise all first team games in the Football League, FA Cup, Football League Cup, Football League Trophy, Football League Third Division South Cup, Southern League, Southern League Cup, Kent League and Kent League Cup. Matches in wartime competitions are excluded, as are supplementary matches played in the Kent League and Thames & Medway Combination between 1895 and 1903, when the club's primary competition was the Southern League.

== Players ==
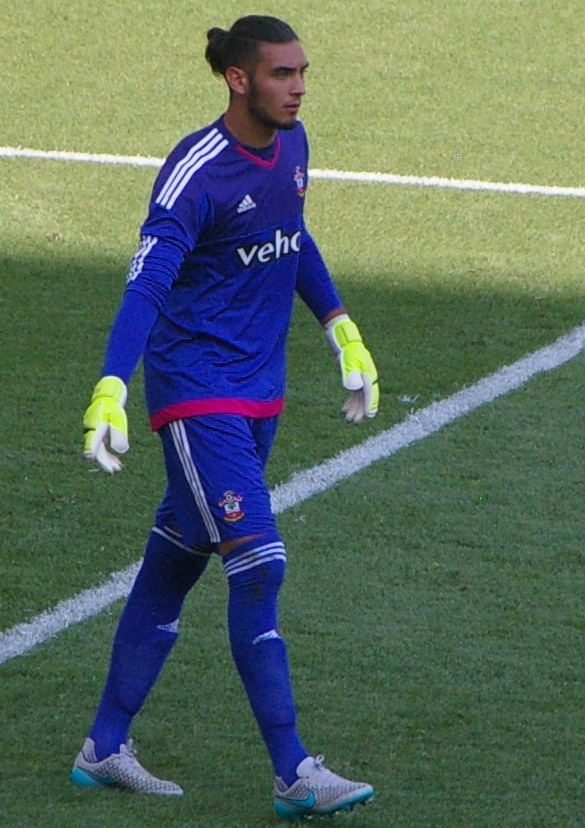
Future Argentina international Paulo Gazzaniga played for Gillingham early in his career

Tom Gilbey only played 14 times for Gillingham but was notable for scoring the club's first ever goal in The Football League

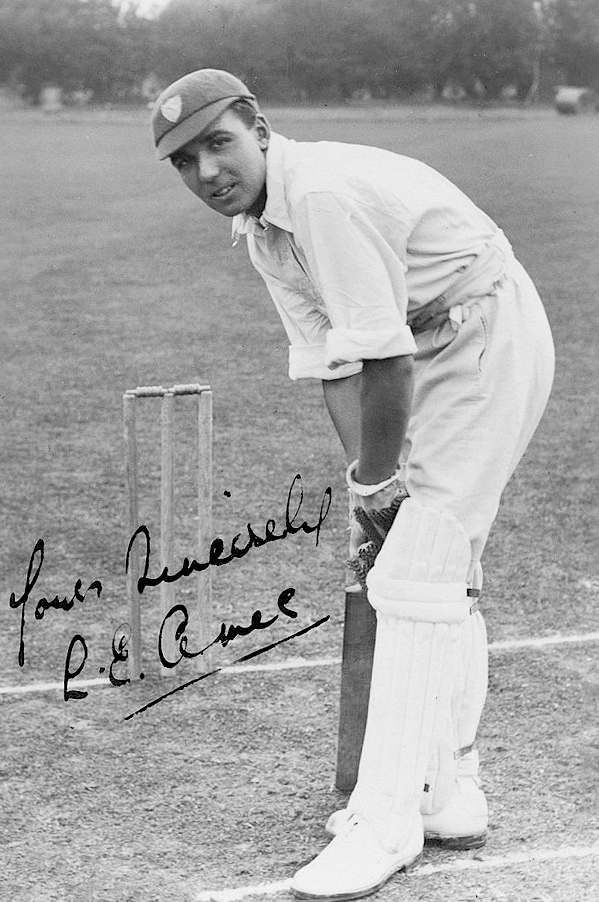
Les Ames was best known as a cricketer, but also played football for Gillingham

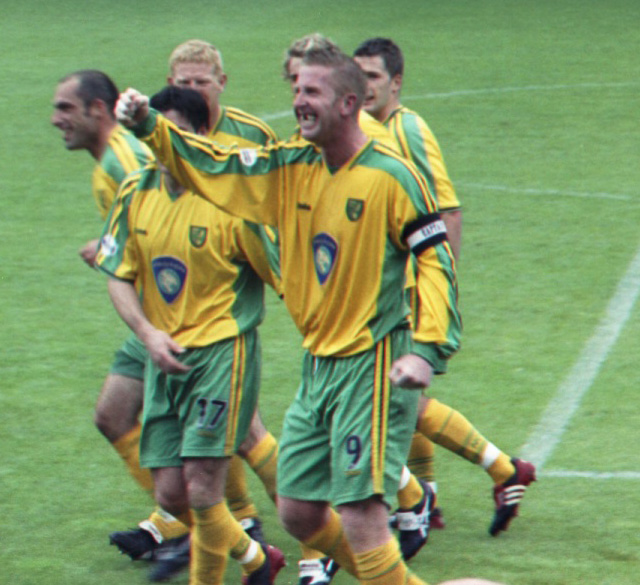
Former Welsh international striker Iwan Roberts (arm raised) played for the club at the end of his career

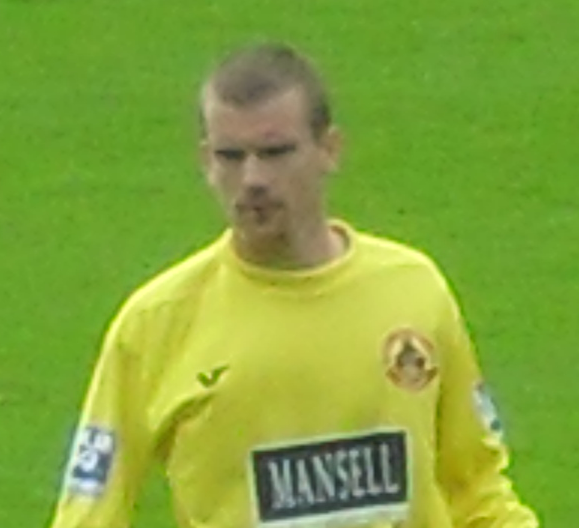
Barry Cogan played for Gillingham during the 2007–08 season

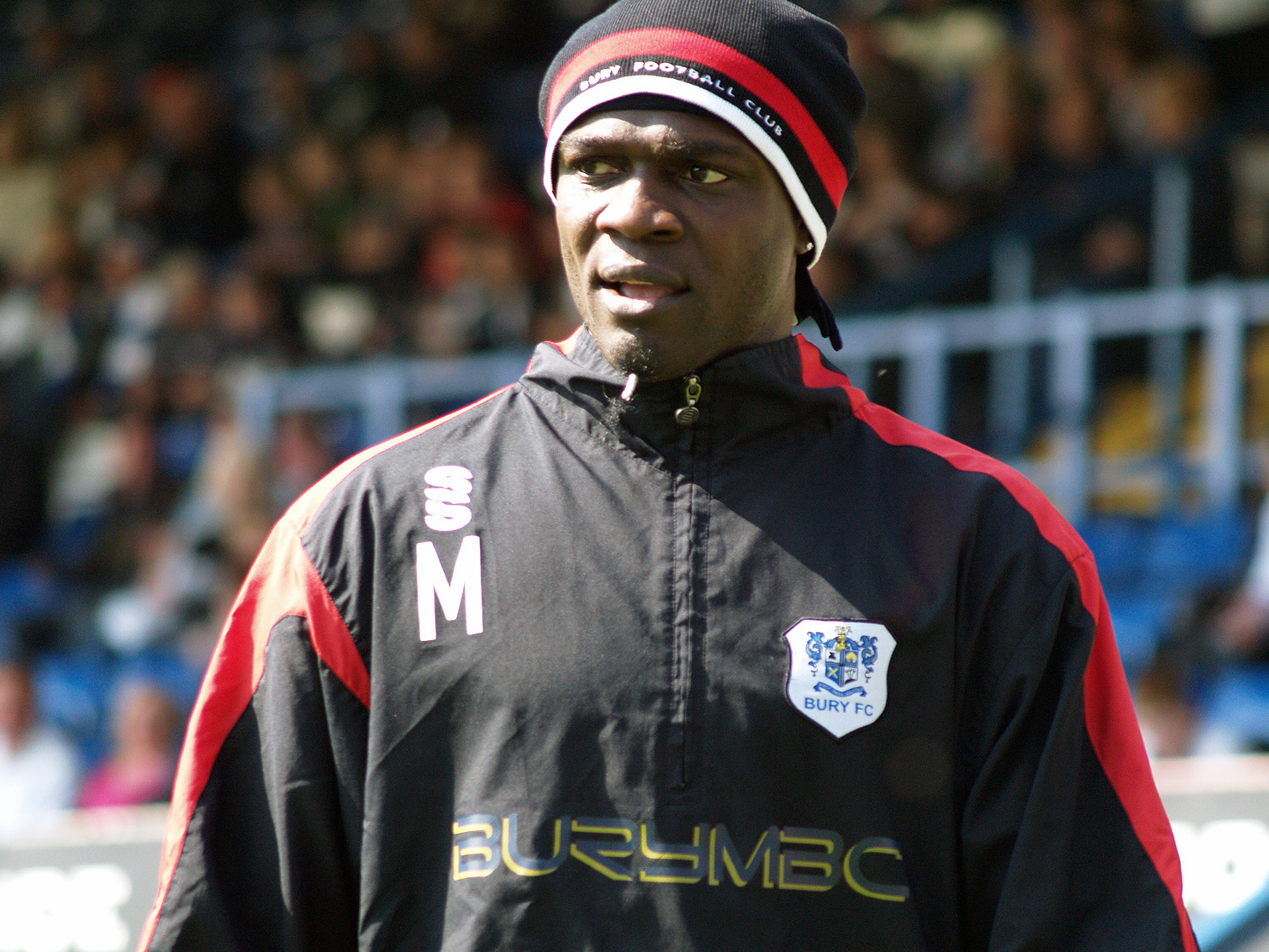
Nigerian international defender Efe Sodje spent one season with Gillingham

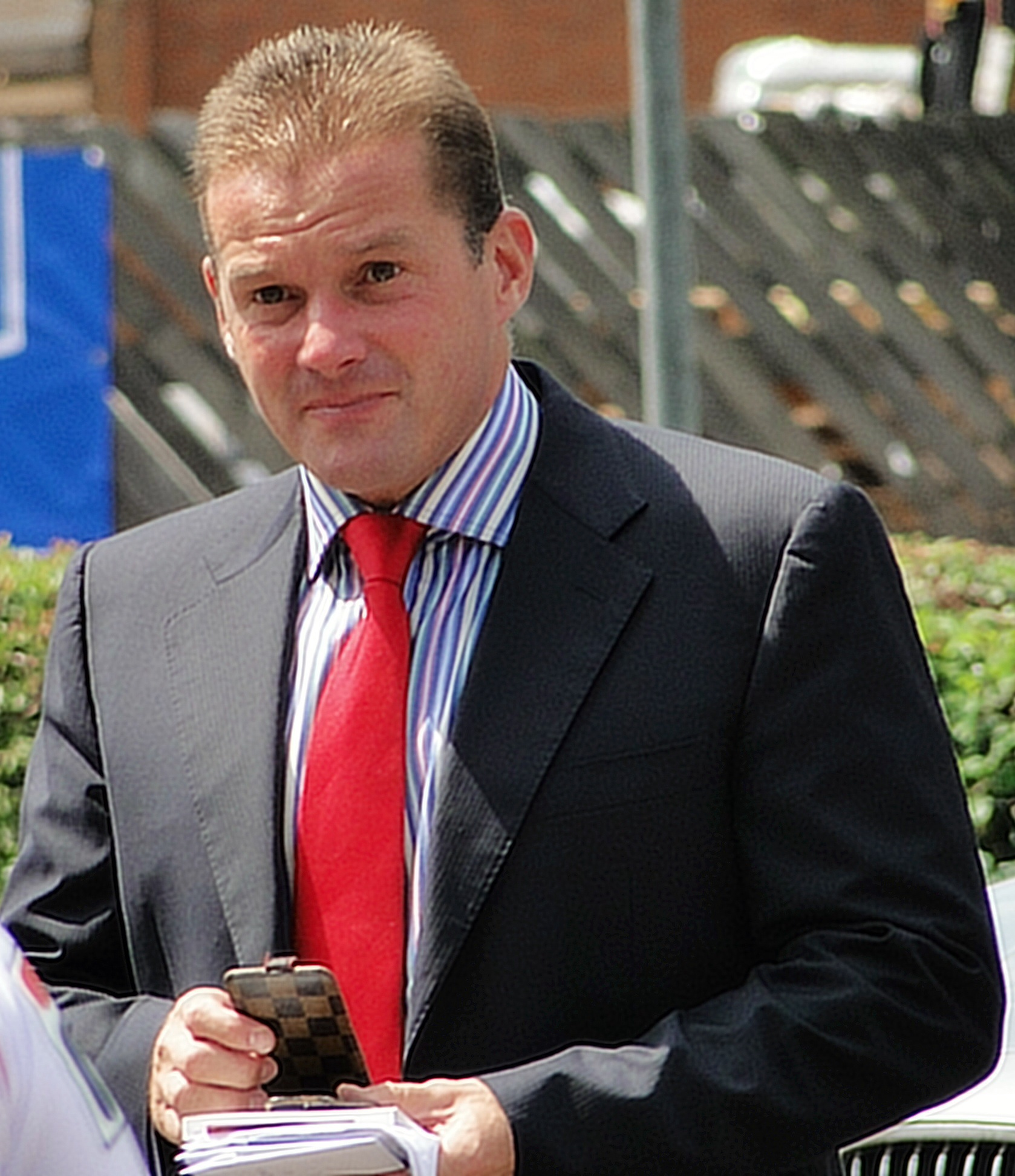
Graham Westley began his career as a Gillingham player, and later had a lengthy career as a manager.

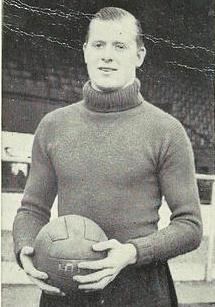
Jock Brown, who had represented Scotland before the Second World War, played for Gillingham in the first season after hostilities ended

List of Gillingham F.C. players with between 1 and 24 appearances
Name	Nationality	Position	Gillingham career	Apps.	Goals	Notes
Ryan Law	England	DF	2022–2023	24	0	
Billy Knott	England	MF	2016–2017	24	1	
Rodney Rowe	England	FW	1999–2000	24	4	
Bill Brindley	England	DF	1976–1977	24	1	
Bob Moffat	England	MF	1965–1968	24	1	
Campbell Whyte	Scotland	FW	1929–1930	24	3	
Robert Buchanan	Scotland	DF	1919–1920	24	0	
John Pickering	England	FW	1907–1908	24	7	
Enoch Lunn	England	FW	1906–1907	24	0	
Billy Lee	England	FW	1906–1907	24	4	
Arthur Beadsworth	England	FW	1905–1906	24	4	
Louis Campbell	unknown	FW	1898–1899	24	4	
Rhys Bennett	England	DF	2021–2022	23	0	
Mark Marshall	Jamaica	FW	2019–2020	23	0	
Josh Rees	England	MF	2018–2019	23	2	
Tony Sinclair	England	DF	2010–2011	23	0	
Chris Dickson	Ghana	FW	2007, 2010	23	12	
Brian McGlinchey	Northern Ireland	DF	1999–2001	23	2	
Archie Young	Scotland	HB	1937–1938	23	0	
Fred Herbert	England	FW	1937–1938	23	8	
Tom Baxter	England	HB	1920–1921	23	0	
Bobby Steel	Scotland	FW	1919–1920	23	3	
Don Weightman	unknown	FW	1914–1915	23	7	
T. Hulmes	unknown	FB	1900–1901	23	1	
Jamie Cumming	England	GK	2021–2022	23	0	
Gerald Sithole	England	MF	2021–2022	22	2	
Paulo Gazzaniga	Argentina	GK	2011–2012	22	0	
Leroy Griffiths	England	FW	2007–2008	22	2	
Iwan Roberts	Wales	FW	2004–2005	22	3	
Terry Jolley	England	FW	1976–1980	22	5	
Eddie Spearritt	England	DF	1976–1977	22	1	
Mick Darrell	England	MF	1970–1971	22	1	
Chic Brodie	Scotland	GK	1957–1958	22	0	
Jack Day	England	GK	1950–1951	22	0	
Bud Rossiter	England	FB	1935–1936	22	0	
Enos Bromage	England	FW	1927–1928	22	6	
Jabez Foster	England	FW	1926–1927	22	4	
B. Read	unknown	FW	1919–1920	22	5	
F. Corbett	unknown	FW	1911–1912	22	6	
J. Hopkins	unknown	FW	1907–1908	22	3	
Jack Peters	unknown	FW	1896–1897	22	6	
Trae Coyle	England	FW	2020–2021	21	4	
John Marquis	England	FW	2015	21	8	
Adam Birchall	Wales	FW	2011–2014	21	1	
Albert Jarrett	Sierra Leone	MF	2008–2009	21	0	
Barry Cogan	Republic of Ireland	MF	2007–2008	21	1	
Mervyn Cawston	England	GK	1976–1977	21	0	
Dave Taylor	England	FW	1957–1959	21	3	
George King	England	FW	1952–1953	21	5	
Dennis Hillman	England	FW	1951–1952	21	0	
Albert Brallisford	England	FW	1937–1939	21	4	
Bill Cartwright	England	FB	1919–1920	21	0	
Malcolm Lennox	unknown	FW	1898–1899	21	6	
Tom Grieve	Scotland	FW	1898–1899	21	8	
Jim Roadley	unknown	GK/FB	1896–1898	21	0	
Ronan Hale	Northern Ireland	FW	2026–	20	5	
Elliott Hewitt	England	DF	2013–2014	20	0	
Craig Stone	England	MF	2005–2008	20	1	
Jon Wallis	England	MF	2005–2006	20	0	
Francis Joseph	England	FW	1988–1990	20	1	
Tommy Taylor	England	FW	1965–1966	20	0	
Tom Crombie	Scotland	FB	1955–1957	20	0	
Harry Williams	unknown	FW	1949–1950	20	18	
George Strong	England	GK	1938–1939	20	0	
Laurie Fishlock	England	FW	1938	20	2	
Jim French	Scotland	FW	1930–1931	20	1	
Andy Durnion	England	FW	1929–1930	20	9	
Jack Beby	England	GK	1929–1930	20	0	
Bill Boswell	England	FW	1927–1928	20	5	
Fred Howard	England	FW	1920–1922	20	5	
John Boden	England	FW	1912–1913	20	5	
Jimmy Robertson	unknown	FW	1903–1904	20	4	
J. Walker	unknown	FW	1895–1897	20	5	
Jacob Wakeling	England	FW	2024–2025	19	1	
Daniel Adshead	England	MF	2021	19	0	
Scott Robinson	Scotland	DF	2020–2021	19	0	
Darren Dennehy	Republic of Ireland	DF	2010	19	0	
David Graham	Scotland	FW	2007–2008	19	4	
Paul Shields	Scotland	FW	2005–2006	19	1	
Howard Moore	England	FW	1967–1968	19	0	
Cyril Simpson	England	HB	1959–1962	19	0	
Arthur Cropper	England	FW	1932–1933	19	3	
Alf Young	England	HB	1928–1929	19	0	
Sam Mason	Scotland	HB	1926–1927	19	1	
Walter Bettridge	England	FB	1922	19	0	
Tommy Waterall	England	FW	1921–1922	19	1	
Eddie Whiteside	unknown	FW	1911–1912	19	4	
Billy Morgan	England	HB	1906–1907	19	0	
Frank Scott	England	FW	1901–1902	19	3	
Robbie Cundy	England	DF	2020–2021	18	1	
Mikael Ndjoli	England	FW	2019–2020	18	3	
Craig Fagan	England	FW	2013–2014	18	2	
Connor Essam	England	DF	2010–2013	18	0	
Rene Howe	England	FW	2010	18	2	
Tom Williams	Cyprus	MF	2005–2006	18	0	
Mark Stimson	England	DF	1988–1989	18	0	
Alan Reeves	England	DF	1988–1989	18	0	
John Furie	England	DF	1967–1968	18	0	
Terry Stacey	England	DF	1963–1965	18	0	
Fred Fisher	England	FW	1935–1936	18	6	
Thomas Shipley	England	FB	1931–1933	18	1	
Hugh Vallance	England	FW	1931	18	10	
Harold Jamieson	England	FW	1930–1932	18	1	
W. Savage	unknown	FW	1919–1920	18	3	
Bill Thomas	unknown	FW	1914–1915	18	3	
J. Hobson	unknown	FW	1909–1910	18	2	
Walter Eames	England	FW	1908–1909	18	5	
John Campbell	unknown	FW	1905–1906	18	3	
F. Lagar	unknown	FB	1903–1905	18	0	
A.E. Crane	unknown	GK	1900–1902	18	0	
A.H. Ashdown	unknown	HB	1894–1896	18	0	
Ben Thompson	England	MF	2022	18	0	
Travis Akomeah	England	DF	2025–2026, 2026	17	0	
Euan Williams	Northern Ireland	MF	2024–2026	17	0	
Kortney Hause	England	DF	2014	17	8	
Danny Hollands	England	MF	2013	17	1	
Tommy Black	Scotland	MF	2005–2006	17	5	
Jimmy Corbett	England	MF	1997–1998	17	2	
Steve Crane	England	FW	1992–1994	17	1	
Tony Pulis	Wales	DF	1989–1990	17	0	
Gary Sutton	England	GK	1980–1982	17	0	
Dennis Housden	England	FW	1971–1973	17	1	
Jimmy Greenhalgh	England	HB	1956–1957	17	1	
Eric Phoenix	England	FW	1954–1956	17	2	
James Harvey	England	GK	1934–1935	17	0	
George Pateman	England	FW	1929–1931	17	5	
Joe Hodnett	England	HB	1927–1928	17	1	
William Cosgrove	England	FW	1923	17	3	
Archie Reay	England	FB	1922–1923	17	0	
Archie Roe	England	FW	1920–1921	17	2	
W.J. Hibden	unknown	HB	1919–1920	17	0	
S.D. Weaver	unknown	FW	1911–1912	17	2	
Harry Phillips	unknown	FW	1905–1906	17	1	
Joe French	England	HB	1901–1902	17	0	
J.T. Janes	unknown	HB	1897–1898	17	0	
Lenni Cirino	Montserrat	MF	2025–2026	16	1	
Jimmy-Jay Morgan	England	MF	2025	16	2	
Josh Walker	England	FW	2024	16	1	
Efe Sodje	Nigeria	DF	2007–2008	16	0	
Adam Bygrave	England	DF	2007–2008	16	0	
Derek Stillie	Scotland	GK	2007–2008	16	0	
James Pinnock	England	FW	1996–2000	16	0	
Trevor Aylott	England	FW	1992–1993	16	4	
Jerry Williams	England	DF	1988–1989	16	0	
Roy Moss	England	FW	1962–1964	16	3	
Fred Smith	England	FW	1937	16	2	
Charlie Campbell	England	HB	1937	16	0	
Fred Castle	Wales	FW	1929–1930	16	3	
Thomas Brennan	Scotland	FW	1929–1930	16	2	
Harold Sly	England	FW	1927–1929	16	1	
John Kelly	Scotland	GK	1926–1927	16	0	
Tommy Williams	England	FW	1924	16	6	
Joe Craddock	England	FW	1920–1926	16	3	
George Gray	England	HB	1914–1915	16	0	
Harry Crane	unknown	GK	1912–1913	16	0	
A.G. Church	unknown	FW	1911–1913	16	2	
Tom Kelly	England	HB	1911–1912	16	0	
William Hales	England	FB	1908–1909	16	1	
T. Gray	unknown	FW	1899–1900	16	2	
D. Bruce	unknown	HB	1895–1897	16	0	
Joe Dickenson	England	FW	1894–1895, 1903–1904	16	8	
Declan Drysdale	England	DF	2020–2021	15	0	
Liam Nash	England	FW	2017–2019	15	0	
Josh Pask	England	DF	2016–2017	15	0	
Jordan Houghton	England	MF	2015–2016	15	1	
Ben Strevens	England	FW	2012–2013	15	2	
Tom Flanagan	Northern Ireland	DF	2012–2013	15	1	
Aaron Brown	England	DF	2007–2008	15	2	
Luis Cumbers	England	FW	2007–2010	15	1	
Bas Savage	England	FW	2006–2007	15	1	
Andy Perry	England	MF	1988–1989	15	0	
Les Gore	England	FW	1948–1949	15	2	
Wilf Crompton	England	FW	1934	15	6	
Len Darling	England	HB	1932–1933	15	0	
Jim McCafferty	Scotland	FW	1929	15	0	
E. Westwood	unknown	FW	1910–1912	15	1	
Joe Warrington	England	FW	1906–1907	15	1	
Charlie Ambler	unknown	GK	1900–1901	15	0	
Sam Jones	Wales	GK	1897–1898	15	0	
Aiden O'Brien	Republic of Ireland	FW	2023	14	2	
Josh Eccles	England	MF	2020	14	0	
Leonardo Lopes	Portugal	MF	2019	14	1	
Chris Herd	Australia	DF/MF	2016–2017	14	0	
Ben Williamson	England	FW	2015–2016	14	0	
Stephen Bywater	England	GK	2014–2015	14	0	
Anton Robinson	England	MF	2013	14	0	
Romain Larrieu	France	GK	2006–2007	14	0	
Darren Freeman	England	FW	1994–1996	14	1	
Paul Stephenson	England	FW	1992–1993	14	2	
Dean Horrix	England	FW	1982–1983	14	0	
Peter Chiswick	England	GK	1956–1957	14	0	
David Hawkins	England	FW	1955–1956	14	8	
Arthur Evans	England	GK	1953–1955	14	0	
R. Day	unknown	FW	1938–1939	14	3	
Leslie Balcombe	England	FW	1934–1937	14	1	
Tom Gilbey	England	FW	1920–1921	14	8	
T.H. Lagan	unknown	FB	1912–1913	14	0	
A.E. Russell	unknown	GK	1894–1895	14	0	
Henry Woods	England	MF	2018–2022	13	0	
Greg Cundle	England	FW	2015–2018	13	1	
Michael Doughty	England	MF	2014–2015	13	0	
Matt Fry	England	DF	2009	13	0	
John Humphrey	England	DF	1996–1997	13	0	
Andy Ramage	England	MF	1994–1995	13	1	
Paul Hague	England	DF	1990–1994	13	0	
Ken Rogers	England	FW	1972–1974	13	1	
Roy Woolcott	England	FW	1971–1972	13	5	
Rod Taylor	England	MF	1963–1966	13	1	
Alf Bentley	England	GK	1958–1962	13	0	
Stan High	England	HB	1932–1933	13	0	
George Smith	England	FW	1923–1924	13	1	
Arthur Sinning	England	FW	1923	13	2	
Willie Oswald	Scotland	FW	1922–1923	13	3	
Bert Nash	England	FW	1919–1920	13	0	
David Chalmers	Scotland	FW	1919–1920	13	1	
Len Ramsell	England	FW	1919–1920	13	1	
W.G. Frost	England	FB	1913–1920	13	0	
Tristan Abrahams	England	FW	2023	12	0	
Bailey Akehurst	England	DF	2021–2023	12	0	
Christian Maghoma	DR Congo	DF	2020–2021	12	0	
Lee Hodson	Northern Ireland	DF	2019–2021	12	0	
Graham Burke	Republic of Ireland	FW	2019	12	1	
Stuart Thurgood	England	MF	2007–2009	12	0	
Francis Collin	England	FW	2005–2007	12	2	
Paul Williams	England	DF	1998–1999	12	0	
Neil Masters	England	DF	1997–1998	12	0	
Scott Lindsey	England	MF	1994–1995	12	0	
Paul Ritchie	Scotland	FW	1992–1993	12	4	
David McDonald	Republic of Ireland	DF	1990–1991	12	0	
Steve Jacobs	England	DF	1986–1987	12	0	
Dave Rushbury	England	DF	1984–1985	12	0	
Peter Henderson	England	FW	1980–1981	12	3	
Dave Huddart	England	GK	1962–1965	12	0	
Terry Matthews	England	FW	1962–1963	12	1	
Roger Challis	England	FB	1960–1963	12	0	
Jim Watts	England	FW	1956–1957	12	1	
Mike Skivington	Scotland	FB	1950–1951	12	0	
Joe Campbell	Scotland	FW	1950–1951	12	2	
Jeffrey Turton	England	FB	1935–1936	12	0	
Joe Wiggins	England	FB	1934–1935	12	0	
Albert Orr	England	FW	1934	12	0	
John Geddes	Scotland	FB	1929–1930	12	1	
Alex Redpath	unknown	FW	1919–1920	12	1	
Bobby Beale	England	GK	1919–1920	12	0	
Charlie Frost	England	FW	1911–1914	12	2	
H.C. Shepherd	unknown	FW	1908–1909	12	2	
H. Auld	unknown	FB	1894–1895	12	0	
Arthur Rule	unknown	FW	1894–1895	12	22	
Harry Waldock	England	MF	2024–	11	0	
Tom Dickson-Peters	Scotland	FW	2022	11	0	
Harvey Lintott	England	ENG	2021–2022	11	0	
Ben Pringle	England	MF	2019–2020	11	0	
Navid Nasseri	Iran	MF	2018–2019	11	1	
Joe Quigley	England	FW	2016, 2017	11	1	
Romain Vincelot	France	MF	2012	11	1	
Danny Cullip	England	DF	2008	11	0	
Kelvin Jack	Trinidad and Tobago	GK	2006–2008	11	0	
Steve Hislop	Scotland	FW	2005–2006	11	0	
Emmanuel Omoyinmi	Nigeria	MF	1999–2000	11	3	
David Kemp	England	FW	1981–1982	11	2	
Tony Bottiglieri	England	MF	1979–1982	11	0	
Michael Kent	England	MF	1970–1971	11	0	
Pat McIntyre	England	FB	1960–1963	11	0	
Fred Morris	England	FW	1960–1961	11	1	
Stewart Pollock	Scotland	FW	1956–1957	11	1	
Cyril Walker	England	FW	1937	11	4	
William Varty	England	FW	1934–1935	11	2	
William Hanney	England	FW	1928–1929	11	4	
George Holland	England	HB	1927–1928	11	0	
Albert Fairclough	England	FW	1927	11	3	
Leonard Ramsell	England	FW	1924–1925	11	2	
George Wakefield	England	HB	1921	11	0	
H. Wood	England	FW	1908–1909	11	2	
A.J. Burns	unknown	FW	1905–1906	11	3	
Jonny Smith	England	MF	2025–2026	10	1	
Jacob Mellis	England	MF	2020–2021	10	1	
Jordan Roberts	England	MF	2020	10	2	
Baily Cargill	England	DF	2016	10	1	
Zesh Rehman	Pakistan	DF	2017	10	0	
George Williams	Wales	FW	2016	10	0	
Adam Chicksen	England	DF	2014, 2016	10	0	
Harry Lennon	England	DF	2014–2015, 2015	10	2	
Connor Smith	Republic of Ireland	MF	2014	10	0	
Gavin Tomlin	England	FW	2012	10	6	
Scott Flinders	England	GK	2006	10	0	
Gavin Grant	England	FW	2005–2006	10	1	
Tony Bullock	England	GK	2005–2006	10	0	
Jonathan Douglas	Republic of Ireland	MF	2004–2005	10	0	
Jay McEveley	Scotland	DF	2004–2005	10	1	
Neil Moss	England	GK	1997–1998	10	0	
Alex Watson	England	DF	1995–1996	10	1	
Robin Trott	England	DF	1993–1995	10	1	
Adrian Owers	England	MF	1990–1991	10	0	
Ricky Pearson	England	DF	1988–1990	10	0	
Dale Tempest	England	FW	1985–1986	10	4	
Jim McDonagh	Republic of Ireland	GK	1984–1985	10	0	
Phil Cavener	England	FW	1983–1984	10	1	
Mark Miller	England	FW	1981–1983	10	1	
Rex Cherry	England	FW	1952–1954	10	4	
Tony Blake	England	FB	1952–1953	10	1	
Les McGuire	England	FW	1950–1952	10	3	
I. Wilson	unknown	FW	1945–1946	10	3	
John Ross	unknown	FW	1938–1939	10	3	
George Emmerson	England	FW	1938	10	0	
Albert Taylor	England	FW	1937–1938	10	3	
Alf Wheeler	England	FW	1936	10	5	
Joe McAleer	Scotland	FW	1936–1937	10	3	
Thomas Syred	England	FW	1933–1935	10	1	
James Shaw	England	FW	1931	10	0	
George Travers	England	FW	1921–1922	10	1	
William Henderson	Scotland	FB	1908–1909	10	0	
Nobbs	unknown	FW	1899–1900	10	0	
Jim Strachan	unknown	FW	1895–1896	10	7	
Francis McNamee	unknown	FW	1895–1896	10	1	
Omar Beckles	Grenada	DF	2026–	9	0	
Rowan Vine	England	FW	2012	9	1	
Jordan Obita	England	MF	2012	9	0	
Tom Wynter	England	DF	2010	9	0	
Febian Brandy	England	FW	2009–2010	9	2	
Rashid Yussuff	England	MF	2009–2010	9	0	
Steve Lomas	Northern Ireland	MF	2007–2008	9	0	
Andy Pugh	England	FW	2007–2010	9	0	
Adam Nowland	England	MF	2004, 2007	9	1	
Jon Ford	England	DF	1996–1997	9	0	
John Gayle	England	FW	1995–1996	9	3	
Steve Brown	England	FW	1994–1996	9	2	
Frank Ovard	England	FW	1981–1982	9	0	
Peter Hall	England	FW	1967–1968	9	1	
Tony Thear	England	FW	1966–1969	9	1	
Irvine Gray	England	FW	1956–1957	9	0	
Billy Hall	England	FW	1952–1953	9	0	
Billy Bates	England	FW	1949–1950	9	0	
George Armstrong	unknown	FB	1949–1950	9	0	
Don Vigor	England	HB	1948–1949	9	0	
J. Nobbs	unknown	FB	1945–1949	9	2	
George Bond	England	FW	1935–1936	9	2	
Harold Pearce	England	FW	1928–1929	9	2	
Jack Williams	England	HB	1928	9	0	
Albert Picken	England	FW	1928	9	1	
Horace Rowden	England	HB	1920–1924	9	0	
Clive Wigmore	England	HB	1920	9	0	
Jimmy Kennedy	Scotland	HB	1919–1920	9	0	
John Neill	unknown	FW	1919–1920	9	0	
Jock Wilson	Scotland	FB	1895–1896	9	0	
J.T. Watsona	unknown	FB	1894–1896	9	0	
Josh Chambers	England	MF	2022–2024	8	0	
Joe Walsh	England	GK	2019–2021	8	0	
Matty Willock	England	MF	2019–2021	8	0	
Bradley Stevenson	England	MF	2016–2019	8	1	
Jonathan Bond	England	GK	2016–2017	8	0	
Adam El-Abd	Egypt	DF	2016	8	0	
Lance Cronin	England	GK	2010–2011	8	0	
Leigh Mills	England	DF	2008–2009	8	1	
Dean Brill	England	GK	2006–2007	8	0	
Bertrand Bossu	France	GK	2003–2005	8	0	
Akwasi Fobi-Edusei	England	FW	2002–2006	8	0	
Jlloyd Samuel	England	DF	2001–2002	8	0	
Mark Morris	England	DF	1996–1997	8	0	
Rod Thomas	England	FW	1991–1992	8	1	
Brendan Place	Republic of Ireland	DF	1989–1990	8	0	
Ian Macowat	England	DF	1984–1986	8	0	
Paul Shinners	England	FW	1984–1985	8	1	
Brian Sparrow	England	DF	1983–1984	8	2	
Colin Clarke	Northern Ireland	FW	1983–1984	8	1	
Ken Ronaldson	Scotland	FW	1969–1971	8	1	
Bob Ryder	England	FB	1964–1968	8	0	
Jim Towers	England	FW	1963	8	6	
Bobby Smith	England	HB	1962–1963	8	0	
John McCorkindale	Scotland	FW	1957–1958	8	0	
George Simpson	England	FW	1956–1957	8	1	
Harry Kirman	England	FB	1953–1954	8	0	
Maurice Moorcroft	England	GK	1952–1953	8	0	
George Skinner	England	FW	1947–1948	8	1	
C. Berwick	unknown	GK	1945–1947	8	0	
Jock Brown	Scotland	GK	1945–1946	8	0	
A. Langmaid	unknown	FB	1938–1939	8	0	
James O'Neill	Scotland	HB	1937–1938	8	0	
Reg Dann	England	HB	1935–1936	8	0	
Sidney Brown	England	GK	1927	8	0	
George Cook	England	HB	1924	8	0	
Henry Allen	England	FW	1923–1924	8	0	
Sammy Simms	England	HB	1921	8	1	
Joseph Griffiths	unknown	HB	1920–1921	8	1	
E. Diddams	unknown	HB	1911–1914	8	0	
Bob Walker	England	FW	1907–1908	8	0	
Jimmy Pass	unknown	FW	1907–1908	8	1	
F. Spriggs	unknown	FW	1907–1908	8	2	
John Orr	unknown	FB	1905–1906	8	0	
Jimmy Sheridan	Ireland	FW	1905–1906	8	1	
H.S. Metherell	unknown	GK	1903–1908	8	0	
Martin Neyland	England	FW	1900–1901	8	4	
Callum Slattery	England	MF	2021	7	0	
Tyreke Johnson	England	MF	2020–2021	7	0	
Amari'i Bell	England	DF	2015	7	0	
Danny Galbraith	Scotland	MF	2014–2015	7	0	
Joe Pigott	England	FW	2014	7	1	
David Wright	England	DF	2012	7	0	
Robbie Findley	United States	FW	2012	7	0	
Jack Evans	England	DF	2011–2013	7	0	
Barry Miller	England	DF	1999–2000	7	0	
Jon Bass	England	DF	1999–2000	7	0	
Kevin Lisbie	Jamaica	FW	1998–1999	7	4	
Andy Marshall	England	GK	1996–1997	7	0	
Mick Bodley	England	DF	1994–1995	7	0	
Glenn Roeder	England	DF	1992–1993	7	0	
Russell Norris	England	DF	1989–1990	7	0	
Mike Buttress	England	DF	1977–1979	7	0	
Bob Tooze	England	GK	1971–1972	7	0	
John Evans	Wales	HB	1957–1958	7	0	
Arthur Adey	Scotland	FW	1954–1955	7	1	
Trevor Granville	Wales	HB	1948–1949	7	0	
W. Cleaves	unknown	FB	1945–1946	7	0	
Eddie Chapman	England	FW	1945–1946	7	11	
E. Foreman	unknown	FW	1938–1946	7	0	
Frank Donoghue	England	HB	1938–1945	7	0	
John Jones	unknown	HB	1938	7	0	
Bryan Dalton	England	FW	1937	7	0	
George Pybus	England	FW	1935–1936	7	1	
Norman Burnett	Scotland	GK	1931	7	0	
Harold Crockford	England	FW	1925	7	1	
Charles Davis	England	HB	1924–1927	7	0	
Arthur Sykes	England	GK	1924–1925	7	0	
Syd Smith	England	FW	1924	7	1	
Henry Martin	England	FW	1921–1922	7	2	
W.J. Otty	unknown	FW	1901–1902	7	0	
D. Keefe	unknown	FB	1895–1896	7	0	
Asher Agbinone	England	MF	2025	6	0	
Dominic Corness	England	MF	2025	6	0	
Pontus Dahlberg	Sweden	GK	2022	6	0	
Tahvon Campbell	England	FW	2019	6	0	
Ben Chapman	England	MF	2016–2019	6	0	
Harry Cornick	England	FW	2017	6	0	
John Mousinho	England	MF	2013–2014	6	1	
Bruce Inkango	France	FW	2010	6	0	
Jacob Erskine	England	FW	2009–2010	6	0	
Tyrone Berry	England	MF	2008	6	0	
Marvin Hamilton	England	DF	2007–2008	6	0	
Gary Wales	Scotland	FW	2003–2004	6	1	
Mike Pollitt	England	GK	1997–1998	6	0	
Steve Castle	England	MF	1995–1996	6	1	
Lawrence Osborne	England	MF	1991–1993	6	1	
Austin Berkley	England	FW	1991–1992	6	0	
Billy Lansdowne	England	FW	1982–1983	6	2	
Keith Wilson	England	FW	1961–1962	6	2	
Peter Smith	England	FW	1954–1957	6	0	
J.E. Ling	England	FW	1945–1946	6	1	
H. Bryant	unknown	FW	1938–1939	6	0	
William Wilson	England	HB	1936–1937	6	0	
John Clark	Scotland	FB	1933	6	0	
Dan Lewis	Wales	GK	1931–1932	6	0	
John Speed	unknown	FW	1930	6	1	
Lewis Woolven	England	FW	1929–1930	6	0	
James McWhirr	Scotland	FW	1925–1926	6	0	
Bert Goodman	England	HB	1925–1926	6	0	
Andy Holt	England	FW	1920	6	0	
W.J. Wimsett	unknown	FW	1914–1915	6	0	
Thomas Bryan	unknown	FW	1895–1896	6	1	
A. Jenner	unknown	GK/FW	1894–1897	6	3	
A. James	unknown	HB	1894	6	0	
Mitchell Dickenson	England	DF	2015–2017	6	0	
Cameron Antwi	England	FW	2026–	5	0	
Harry Webster	England	DF	2024–	5	0	
Haji Mnoga	Tanzania	DF	2022	5	0	
Ousseynou Cisse	Mali	MF	2019–2020	5	1	
Aaron Simpson	England	MF	2017–2018	5	0	
Ashley Miller	England	FW	2010–2014	5	1	
James Walker	England	FW	2010	5	0	
Rene Steer	England	DF	2009	5	0	
Charlie Daniels	England	FW	2008	5	1	
Felix Bastians	Germany	MF	2006–2007	5	1	
Justin Cochrane	England	MF	2005–2006	5	1	
Nico Vaesen	Belgium	GK	2003–2004	5	0	
Lee Matthews	England	FW	1999–2000	5	0	
Christian Lee	England	FW	1999–2000	5	0	
Kenny Brown	England	DF	1998–1999	5	0	
Stuart Elliott	England	DF	1998–1999	5	0	
Ian Hutchinson	England	DF	1994–1995	5	0	
Gareth Knott	Wales	MF	1994–1995	5	0	
Steve Walford	England	DF	1988–1989	5	0	
David Tong	England	MF	1985–1986	5	0	
Paul Garner	England	DF	1983–1984	5	0	
Ray Daniel	England	DF	1983–1984	5	0	
Peter Foley	England	FW	1982–1983	5	0	
Nigel Donn	England	MF	1980–1982	5	0	
Phil Burrows	England	DF	1977–1978	5	0	
Ian Thorpe	England	GK	1973–1974	5	0	
Derek Grace	England	FW	1965–1966	5	0	
Gordon Brasted	England	FW	1956–1957	5	4	
Arthur Hughes	Scotland	FW	1955–1956	5	1	
George Poulton	England	FW	1951–1952	5	1	
Dick Hales	England	FB	1951–1952	5	0	
Randolph Jenkins	Republic of Ireland	FW	1950–1951	5	0	
D. Walker	unknown	FW	1945–1948	5	2	
A. Martin	unknown	HB	1945–1946	5	2	
James Renwick	Scotland	FW	1931	5	3	
Les Ames	England	FW	1931	5	1	
Wally Rivers	England	FW	1927–1929	5	1	
Thomas Wilkinson	Scotland	FW	1924	5	0	
Alf Vango	England	HB	1923–1929	5	0	
John Cartmell	England	FW	1923–1924	5	0	
Leo Cassell	England	FW	1922	5	1	
Donald McCormick	unknown	FW	1920–1921	5	1	
R. Cavanna	unknown	HB	1919–1920	5	0	
Billy Bower	England	GK	1919–1920	5	0	
C.J. Elliott	unknown	HB	1919–1920	5	0	
Bill Godley	unknown	FW	1907–1908	5	1	
George Lissenden	unknown	HB	1906–1907	5	0	
R. Wright	unknown	FW	1901–1903	5	0	
Albert Lister	unknown	FW	1895–1896	5	3	
P. Cochrane	unknown	FW	1895–1896	5	0	
Louie Dayal	England	MF	2025–	4	0	
Cruz Beszant	England	MF	2025–	4	1	
Stan Sargent	England	FW	2024–	4	1	
Luca Ashby-Hammond	England	GK	2024–2025	4	0	
Alex Giles	England	DF	2022–2025	4	0	
Callum Harriott	Guyana	FW	2022–2023	4	0	
Finn O'Mara	Republic of Ireland	DF	2016–2018	4	0	
Tom Hadler	England	GK	2017–2019	4	0	
Ollie Muldoon	England	MF	2015, 2017	4	0	
Tommy Forecast	England	GK	2012–2013	4	0	
Georges Ba	Ivory Coast	FW	2008	4	0	
Darren Randolph	Republic of Ireland	GK	2006–2007	4	0	
Mark Corneille	England	DF	2005–2006	4	0	
Moses Ashikodi	Antigua and Barbuda	MF	2005–2006	4	0	
John Robinson	Wales	MF	2004–2005	4	0	
Trevor Benjamin	England	FW	2003–2004	4	1	
Wayne Brown	England	DF	2003–2004	4	1	
Jones Awuah	England	FW	2002–2003	4	0	
Tony Williams	Wales	GK	1999–2000	4	0	
George Ndah	England	FW	1997–1998	4	0	
Paul Wilson	England	FW	1994–1995	4	0	
Grant Watts	England	FW	1994–1995	4	0	
Andy Polston	England	DF	1991–1992	4	0	
Steve Thompson	England	DF	1989–1990	4	0	
Colin Gordon	England	FW	1986–1987	4	2	
Andy Woodhead	England	MF	1983–1984	4	0	
Martin Hodge	England	GK	1982–1983	4	0	
Steve Wheatley	England	GK	1976–1978	4	0	
John Emanuel	Wales	MF	1975–1976	4	0	
John Davis	Wales	DF	1975–1976	4	0	
Henry Hill	England	MF	1971–1972	4	0	
George Wright	England	FB	1962–1963	4	0	
John Murray	England	FB	1951–1952	4	0	
T. Hopper	unknown	FW	1946–1947	4	2	
Pat Ravenscroft	England	FW	1945–1946	4	1	
Charles Smethurst	England	HB	1936	4	0	
Hugh Mooney	Northern Ireland	FW	1933	4	0	
Stan Griffiths	England	FW	1933–1934	4	0	
Ernie Watkins	England	FW	1931	4	0	
Albert Rotherham	England	HB	1931	4	0	
Amos Dee	Wales	HB	1928	4	0	
Eddy Donaghy	England	HB	1927–1928	4	0	
Jimmy Keegan	England	FW	1924	4	0	
William Savage	England	FW	1923	4	0	
G.F. Burgess	unknown	FB	1914–1915	4	0	
C.D. Fotheringham	unknown	FW	1913–1915	4	1	
Barker	unknown	FW	1907–1908	4	0	
George Snelgrove	unknown	FW	1905–1906	4	0	
Joe Connor	Ireland	FW	1903–1904	4	0	
Albert Gosnell	England	FW	1901–1902	4	1	
Cooper	unknown	FW	1898–1899	4	0	
John Hodgkinson	England	HB	1897–1898	4	0	
Logan Dobbs	England	DF	2025–	3	1	
Taite Holtam	England	GK	2022–	3	0	
Matty MacArthur	Australia	MF	2023	3	0	
Ike Orji	England	DF	2023–2024	3	0	
Jorge Cabezas Hurtado	Colombia	FW	2024	3	0	
Lewis Page	England	DF	2023	3	0	
Noel Mbo	England	FW	2017–2019	3	1	
Billy King	Scotland	MF	2019	3	0	
Jamie O'Hara	England	MF	2016	3	0	
Ryan Inniss	England	DF	2014	3	0	
Devante McKain	England	DF	2013–2015	3	0	
Donervon Daniels	Montserrat	DF	2013–2014	3	1	
Stephen Butcher	England	DF	2013–2014	3	1	
Josh Hare	England	MF	2012–2016	3	0	
Callum Kennedy	England	DF	2010	3	0	
Jaime Peters	Canada	MF	2009	3	0	
Donovan Simmonds	England	FW	2008	3	0	
Charlie Howard	England	MF	2007–2009	3	0	
Luke Freeman	England	FW	2007–2008	3	0	
Dale Tonge	England	DF	2006–2007	3	0	
Dean Marney	England	DF	2004–2005	3	0	
Paul Gallacher	Scotland	GK	2004–2005	3	0	
Matt Bodkin	England	FW	2004–2005	3	0	
Jonathan Gould	Scotland	GK	1996–1997	3	0	
Scott Houghton	England	FW	1992–1993	3	0	
Mike Harle	England	DF	1990–1991	3	0	
Peter Gleasure	England	GK	1990–1991	3	0	
Malcolm Smith	England	MF	1987–1988	3	0	
Mark Beeney	England	GK	1986–1987	3	0	
Graham Westley	England	FW	1985–1987	3	0	
Allen Scotting	England	DF	1983–1984	3	0	
Wayne Stokes	England	DF	1982–1984	3	0	
Eddie McManus	England	FW	1960–1961	3	0	
Barry Judges	England	HB	1957–1959	3	0	
Roger Darvell	England	FB	1957–1958	3	0	
Ron Bean	England	GK	1951–1952	3	0	
Jim Kelly	England	FW	1951–1952	3	0	
Joe Millbank	England	HB	1949–1950	3	0	
E. Dimmock	unknown	HB	1947–1948	3	0	
C. Burgess	unknown	FW	1947–1948	3	0	
Harry Lillis	unknown	HB	1945–1946	3	2	
Norman Brickenden	England	GK	1936–1938	3	0	
Robert Boylen	England	FW	1930–1931	3	0	
Arthur Smeaton	England	HB	1930	3	0	
Sydney Martin	South Africa	FW	1929	3	0	
Charles Record	England	FW	1926	3	1	
Francis Gear	England	HB	1925–1926	3	0	
Wally Barnard	England	FB	1923–1926	3	0	
James Batchelor	England	FW	1922–1923	3	0	
Raymond Ramsay	unknown	FW	1922	3	0	
George Russell	England	FW	1921	3	0	
Thomas Robinson	England	FW	1920	3	1	
Trevett Read	unknown	GK	1920–1924	3	0	
George Shaw	England	FB	1920–1922	3	0	
Alf Bluer	unknown	HB	1919–1920	3	0	
J. McArthur	unknown	FB	1909–1910	3	0	
Peter Beale	England	FW	1909–1910	3	0	
McKinnell	unknown	FB	1906–1908	3	0	
Lawrence Smith	unknown	FW	1903–1904	3	0	
Alex Davidson	Scotland	FW	1903–1904	3	0	
G. May	unknown	FW	1900–1901	3	0	
Ernest Gray	unknown	FB	1899–1900	3	0	
Bill White	Scotland	FW	1898–1899	3	0	
Bailey	unknown	GK	1897–1898	3	0	
Ferguson	unknown	FW	1897–1898	3	1	
Remnant	unknown	FW	1897–1898	3	1	
Jim Stuart	unknown	FW	1897–1898	3	1	
Bill Fairclough	unknown	GK	1897–1898	3	0	
W. Shaves	unknown	HB	1896–1897	3	0	
Harrison	unknown	GK	1896–1897	3	0	
W.H. Drew	unknown	HB	1895–1896	3	0	
J. Guthrie	unknown	HB	1895–1896	3	0	
Stanley Skipper	England	MF	2023–2026	2	0	
Ronald Sithole	England	FW	2023	2	0	
Joe Lumley	England	GK	2020	2	0	
Franck Moussa	Belgium	MF	2018	2	0	
Steve Arnold	England	GK	2017–2018	2	0	
Aaron Millbank	England	FW	2014–2016	2	0	
Sam Muggleton	England	DF	2013	2	0	
Danny East	England	DF	2013	2	0	
Michael Richardson	England	MF	2013	2	0	
Andy White	England	FW	2010–2011	2	0	
Tristan Plummer	England	FW	2010	2	0	
Craig Rocastle	Grenada	DF	2008	2	0	
Luke Howell	England	DF	2006	2	0	
Steve Claridge	England	FW	2005	2	0	
Dean Beckwith	England	DF	2005	2	0	
Lars Hirschfeld	Canada	GK	2004	2	0	
Tony Dobson	England	DF	1998	2	0	
Andy Ansah	England	FW	1996	2	0	
Andy Kennedy	Scotland	FW	1994	2	0	
Lee Harrison	England	GK	1992	2	0	
Dave Jordan	England	FW	1991	2	0	
Gary Smith	England	MF	1989	2	0	
Lindon Guscott	England	FW	1989	2	0	
Tony Parks	England	GK	1987	2	0	
John Gorman	Scotland	DF	1986	2	0	
Paul Edwards	England	MF	1984	2	0	
Tarki Micallef	Wales	MF	1984	2	0	
Phil Walker	England	MF	1982	2	0	
Kevin Lloyd	England	FW	1980	2	0	
Phil Owers	England	GK	1976	2	0	
Brian Gregory	Northern Ireland	FW	1974	2	0	
Ken Osborn	England	FW	1968–1969	2	0	
Micky Williamson	England	FW	1965	2	0	
Peter Sanders	Wales	FW	1962	2	0	
Evan Griffiths	England	HB	1961	2	0	
Terry Friday	England	GK	1961	2	0	
Keith Dibden	England	FW	1958	2	0	
Cliff Hazel	England	FW	1958	2	0	
Mike Acland	England	FW	1957	2	0	
Eric Cousans	England	FW	1956	2	0	
Johnny Maher	England	FW	1955	2	1	
V. Cook	unknown	GK	1949	2	0	
B. Diggins	unknown	FW	1948	2	1	
D. Sylvester	unknown	GK	1946–1947	2	0	
K. Wells	unknown	FW	1945	2	0	
T. Wright	unknown	HB	1945	2	0	
F. Daniels	unknown	HB	1945	2	0	
C. Clark	unknown	FW	1945	2	2	
C. Timmins	unknown	FB	1945	2	0	
L. Williams	unknown	HB	1945	2	0	
Tom McAdam	unknown	FW	1938	2	0	
A. Smith	England	HB	1938–1939	2	0	
Leslie Williams	England	HB	1937–1939	2	0	
Leo Loftus	England	FW	1935	2	0	
Albert Woods	England	HB	1931	2	0	
John Graham	England	HB	1931	2	0	
William Cronin	Scotland	FW	1931	2	0	
Albert Smith	England	FW	1931	2	1	
Jimmy Harbot	England	FW	1931	2	1	
Robert Robinson	England	HB	1929	2	0	
John Brown	England	FW	1927	2	0	
John Ward	England	GK	1926	2	0	
Joseph Tredwell	England	FW	1924	2	0	
William Arnold	England	FW	1922	2	1	
Albert Carter	England	FW	1920	2	0	
Harry Dawson	England	FW	1919	2	0	
J.H. Meath	England	GK	1919–1920	2	0	
A.R. Harris	unknown	HB	1919	2	0	
John Joyce	England	GK	1919–1920	2	0	
M. Lovett	unknown	FW	1914–1915	2	0	
A. Bell	unknown	GK	1912	2	0	
J.T. Luff	unknown	GK	1910	2	0	
Daws	unknown	HB	1907	2	1	
Albert Webb	unknown	FB	1905–1907	2	0	
F.J. Felton	unknown	FW	1904	2	0	
W.W. Youngs	unknown	FW	1902	2	0	
H. Harvey	unknown	FW	1900	2	0	
Archibald Pinnell	unknown	GK	1899	2	0	
W. Robertson	unknown	FW	1899	2	0	
E. Garside	unknown	HB	1896	2	0	
J. Spooner	unknown	FW	1895	2	0	
Sullivan Booth	England	FW	2026–	1	1	
Michael Luxton	England	FW	2026–	1	0	
Harry Bridle	England	FW	2025–2026	1	0	
James Morton	England	MF	2021	1	0	
Jesse Starkey	England	MF	2017	1	0	
Rhys Murphy	Republic of Ireland	FW	2018	1	0	
Miquel Scarlett	England	MF	2018	1	0	
Michael Freiter	England	MF	2015	1	0	
Jack Marriott	England	FW	2014	1	0	
Harry Grant	England	MF	2013	1	0	
Kane Haysman	England	MF	2013	1	0	
Nathan Nyafli	England	FW	2013	1	1	
Mahlon Romeo	England	DF	2013	1	0	
Alex Brown	England	MF	2012	1	0	
Dean Rance	England	MF	2011	1	0	
Stanley Aborah	Ghana	MF	2010	1	0	
Scott Vernon	England	FW	2009	1	0	
Tom Murphy	England	FW	2008	1	0	
Paul Crichton	England	GK	2005	1	0	
Mark Lovell	England	FW	2001	1	0	
Michael Phillips	England	MF	2001	1	0	
Steve Mautone	Australia	GK	2000	1	0	
Charlie Mitten	England	GK	1999	1	0	
Franck Rolling	France	DF	1998	1	0	
Mark Walton	Wales	GK	1998	1	0	
Andrew Sambrook	England	DF	1997	1	0	
Kevin Bremner	Scotland	FW	1995	1	0	
Alan Nicholls	England	GK	1995	1	0	
Jon Hooker	England	FW	1994	1	0	
Abdul Kamara	England	MF	1994	1	0	
Kevin Hunt	England	MF	1992	1	0	
Matt Joseph	England	DF	1992	1	0	
Richard Dalton	Republic of Ireland	GK	1991	1	0	
Keith Branagan	England	GK	1991	1	0	
Eamonn Collins	Republic of Ireland	MF	1988	1	0	
Neil Luff	England	MF	1987	1	0	
Ian Young	unknown	FW	1984	1	0	
Colin Ford	England	DF	1980	1	0	
Mark Swaine	England	FW	1974	1	0	
Kevin Johnson	England	MF	1974	1	0	
Bobby Harrison	England	FW	1967	1	0	
Billy Jervis	England	FW	1961	1	0	
Hughie Stinson	England	HB	1959	1	0	
Ed Tudor	England	FW	1958	1	0	
Don Rossiter	England	FW	1957	1	0	
Bert Carberry	Scotland	HB	1956	1	0	
Jim McDonald	Scotland	FW	1956	1	0	
Bill Grant	England	HB	1956	1	0	
George Sperring	England	FW	1955	1	0	
David Jones	England	FW	1955	1	0	
George Baldwin	England	HB	1951	1	0	
F. Collier	unknown	FB	1949	1	0	
J. Kay	unknown	FW	1949	1	0	
Cyril O'Sullivan	England	GK	1948	1	0	
R. Morris	unknown	FW	1948	1	0	
G. Milton	unknown	FW	1947	1	0	
F. Edwards	unknown	GK	1947	1	0	
T. Cudahay	unknown	FW	1946	1	0	
G. Lukehurst	unknown	FB	1946	1	0	
D. Morris	unknown	FW	1946	1	0	
T. Parker	unknown	FW	1946	1	1	
L. Harris	unknown	HB	1946	1	0	
K. Allbut	unknown	FW	1946	1	0	
J. Wrigglesworth	unknown	FW	1946	1	0	
Kain	unknown	GK	1946	1	0	
Donaldson	unknown	HB	1946	1	0	
J. Parker	unknown	FW	1946	1	0	
T. Hilton	unknown	FW	1945	1	0	
Allerton	unknown	HB	1945	1	0	
L. Oliver	unknown	FW	1945	1	0	
Wheller	unknown	HB	1945	1	0	
J. Weight	unknown	HB	1945	1	0	
W. Harrison	unknown	FW	1945	1	3	
Temlett	unknown	FW	1945	1	0	
Jackson	unknown	FB	1945	1	0	
Billy Ivison	England	FW	1945	1	0	
Bill Williams	Wales	HB	1937	1	0	
Richard Maudsley	unknown	FW	1937	1	0	
George Stanbury	England	GK	1934	1	0	
Frank Torr	England	FW	1933	1	0	
William Parker	unknown	FW	1932	1	0	
Ronald Baird	England	FB	1930	1	0	
Thomas Taylor	England	FW	1926	1	0	
Charles Orford	England	HB	1925	1	0	
Ernest Ollerenshaw	England	GK	1921	1	0	
Alfred Milton	England	FB	1920	1	0	
T.F. Turner	unknown	FW	1919	1	0	
C. Denny	unknown	FW	1919	1	0	
W. Hunter	unknown	FB	1919	1	0	
F.J. Hall	unknown	GK	1914	1	0	
Sam Hulses	unknown	HB	1913	1	0	
Bill Pepper	unknown	GK	1913	1	0	
T. Whiteside	unknown	HB	1913	1	0	
C.W. Gudgeon	unknown	FW	1911	1	0	
J. Brown	unknown	HB	1909	1	0	
McLachlan	unknown	HB	1907	1	0	
J. Brisley	unknown	FB	1907	1	0	
Page	unknown	FW	1906	1	0	
Taylorson	unknown	FW	1905	1	0	
A.E. Sears	unknown	FW	1904	1	0	
Knowlden	unknown	FB	1901	1	0	
T. Bailey	unknown	FB	1900	1	0	
J. Shinner	unknown	FW	1899	1	0	
Miller	unknown	FW	1899	1	0	
Jones	unknown	HB	1899	1	0	
Patrick Leonard	unknown	FW	1898	1	0	
Whittingham	unknown	GK	1898	1	0	
Docherty	unknown	FW	1897	1	0	
Wynn	unknown	HB	1896	1	0	
Lawrie	unknown	FW	1896	1	0	
Colling	unknown	FB	1896	1	0	
C.E. Hibbard	unknown	FW	1896	1	0	
C. Welch	unknown	GK	1896	1	0	
W. Barlow	unknown	FW	1895	1	0	
P. Scott	unknown	HB	1895	1	0	
Slade	unknown	FB	1895	1	0	
R. Read	unknown	FW	1894	1	0	
A. Webb	unknown	FW	1894	1	3	

== See also ==
- List of Gillingham F.C. players, for those players with 50 or more appearances for the club
- List of Gillingham F.C. players (25–49 appearances)
