= Brindley (disambiguation) =

Brindley is a village in Cheshire, England.

Brindley may also refer to:

== Places ==
- Brindley Heath, Staffordshire, England
- Brindley Mountain, Alabama, United States

== People ==
=== Surname ===
- Anne Neu Brindley, American politician
- Aud Brindley (1923–1957), American basketball player
- Bill Brindley (footballer) (1947–2007), English footballer
- Brian Brindley (1931–2001), Anglican priest
- Charles Brindley (born 1955), American artist
- Chris Brindley (born 1969), English footballer
- David Brindley (born 1953), Church of England priest
- Doug Brindley (born 1949), Canadian ice hockey player
- Gavin Brindley (born 2004), American ice hockey player
- George W. Brindley (1905–1983), British-American crystallographer and mineralogist
- Giles Brindley (born 1926), British physiologist and musicologist
- Harry Samuel Bickerton Brindley (1867–1920), British engineer
- Horace Brindley (1885–1971), English footballer
- James Brindley (1716–1772), English engineer
- John Brindley (1850–1926), American jurist and legislator
- Lewis Brindley (born 1983), British YouTube gamer and Yogscast co-founder
- Dame Lynne Brindley (born 1950), British librarian
- Madge Brindley (1901–1968), British film actress
- Maud Doria Brindley (1889–1941), English ornithologist and explorer
- Maud Mary Brindley (1866–1939), English artist and suffragette
- Neil Brindley (born 1967), Australian rules footballer
- Oscar Brindley (1885–1918), American aviator
- Paul Brindley (musician), English bassist of The Sundays
- Paul Brindley (biologist) (born 1954), Australian parasitologist
- Richard Brindley (born 1993), English footballer
- Roy Brindley (born 1969), British professional poker player
- Thomas Brindley (1841–1911), English cricketer
- Tomas Brindley (born 2001), Scottish footballer
- Tracey Brindley (born 1972), British runner
- William Brindley (1896–1958), English police officer and cricketer
- William Brindley (1832–1919), British architectural sculptor of Farmer & Brindley

=== Given name ===
- Brindley Benn (1923–2009), Guyanese politician
- Brindley Charles (born 1948), Dominican cricketer

== Other uses ==
- Brindley Farm, Wilmington, Delaware
- The Brindley, a theatre in Runcorn, Cheshire, England
- Brindley Water Mill, Leek, Staffordshire, England
