= 1983–84 Gillingham F.C. season =

English football club season

Gillingham F.C.
1983–84 season
- Chairman: Clifford Grossmark (until 12 November); Charles Cox (from no later than early December)
- Manager: Keith Peacock
- Third Division: 8th
- FA Cup: Fourth round
- League Cup: First round
- Associate Members' Cup: First round
- Top goalscorer: League: Dave Mehmet (16); All: Dave Mehmet (17)
- Highest home attendance: 17,817 vs Everton (6 February 1984)
- Lowest home attendance: 3,019 vs Hull City (3 September 1983)
Home colours	Away colours

During the 1983–84 English football season, Gillingham F.C. competed in the Football League Third Division, the third tier of the English football league system. It was the 52nd season in which Gillingham competed in the Football League and the 34th since the club was voted back into the league in 1950. The team started the season poorly and were near the bottom of the league table after six games, but won five times in October to move into the top half, where they remained at the end of 1983. After only playing one league match in January, Gillingham were 10th in the 24-team table at the end of February but were in the advantageous position of having up to four games more to play than the teams above them. During March and April, however, they played 15 games and only won three times to fall out of contention for promotion to the Second Division. After winning three out of four games in May, the team finished the season 8th in the table, missing out on promotion by five places.

Gillingham also competed in three knock-out competitions. They lost in the first round of both the Football League Cup and the Associate Members' Cup but reached the fourth round of the FA Cup, at which stage they held Everton of the First Division, the highest level of English football, to two goalless draws before losing a second replay. The team played 55 competitive matches, winning 23, drawing 12, and losing 20. Dave Mehmet was the club's leading goalscorer, with 17 goals in all competitions. John Leslie made the most appearances, missing only one game. The highest attendance recorded at the club's home ground, Priestfield Stadium, was 17,817 for the second of the two replays against Everton.

== Background and pre-season ==
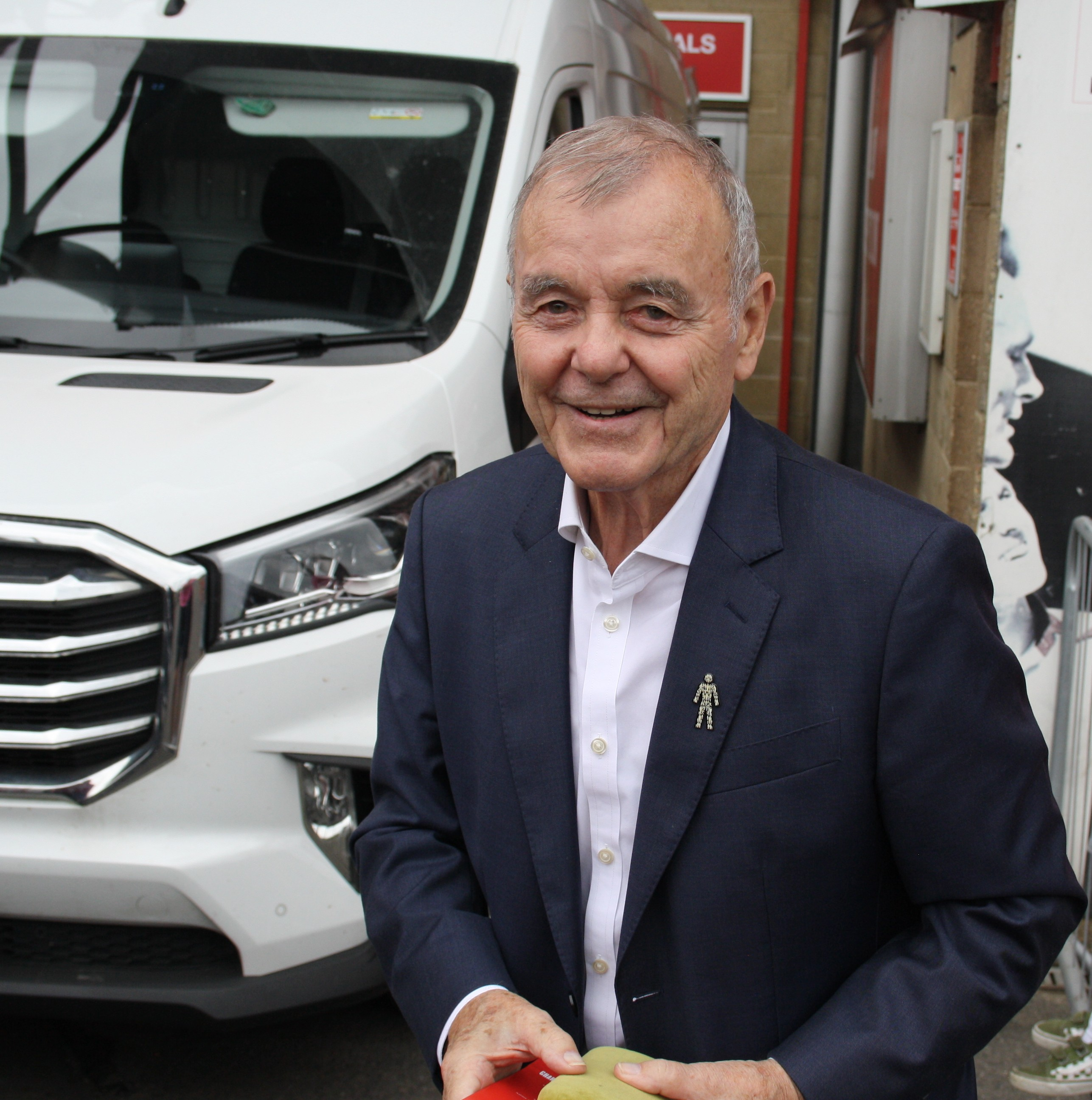
Keith Peacock (pictured in 2025) was the club's manager.

The 1983–84 season was Gillingham's 52nd season playing in the Football League and the 34th since the club was elected back into the League in 1950 after being voted out in 1938. It was the club's 10th consecutive season in the Football League Third Division, the third tier of the English football league system, since the team gained promotion from the Fourth Division in 1974. In the nine seasons since then, the team had achieved a best finish of fourth place, one position away from promotion to the Second Division, in the 1978–79 season. The club had never reached the second level of English football in its history.

Keith Peacock was the club's manager for a third season, having been appointed in July 1981. Paul Taylor served as assistant manager and Bill Collins, who had been with the club in a variety of roles since the early 1960s, held the posts of first-team trainer and manager of the youth team. Before the new season, Gillingham signed two new players: John Leslie, a forward, arrived from Wimbledon, and David Fry, a goalkeeper, joined the club from Crystal Palace, both on free transfers. Peacock also attempted to sign another forward, Mike Barrett, but although his club, Bristol Rovers, accepted Gillingham's proposed transfer fee, the player chose to reject the move. Players leaving Gillingham included Micky Adams, who was transferred to Coventry City of the First Division for a fee of £85,000, a new record for the highest transfer fee received by the club.

The team's kit for the season consisted of Gillingham's usual blue shirts, white shorts and white socks. The away kit, to be worn in the event of a clash of colours with the home team, comprised red shirts, black shorts and black socks. The players prepared for the new season with several friendlies, mostly against other Football League teams but including a match against the national team of Japan, a game attended by the Japanese ambassador as well as by Sir Stanley Rous, a former president of FIFA, the sport's global governing body.

== Third Division ==
=== August–December ===
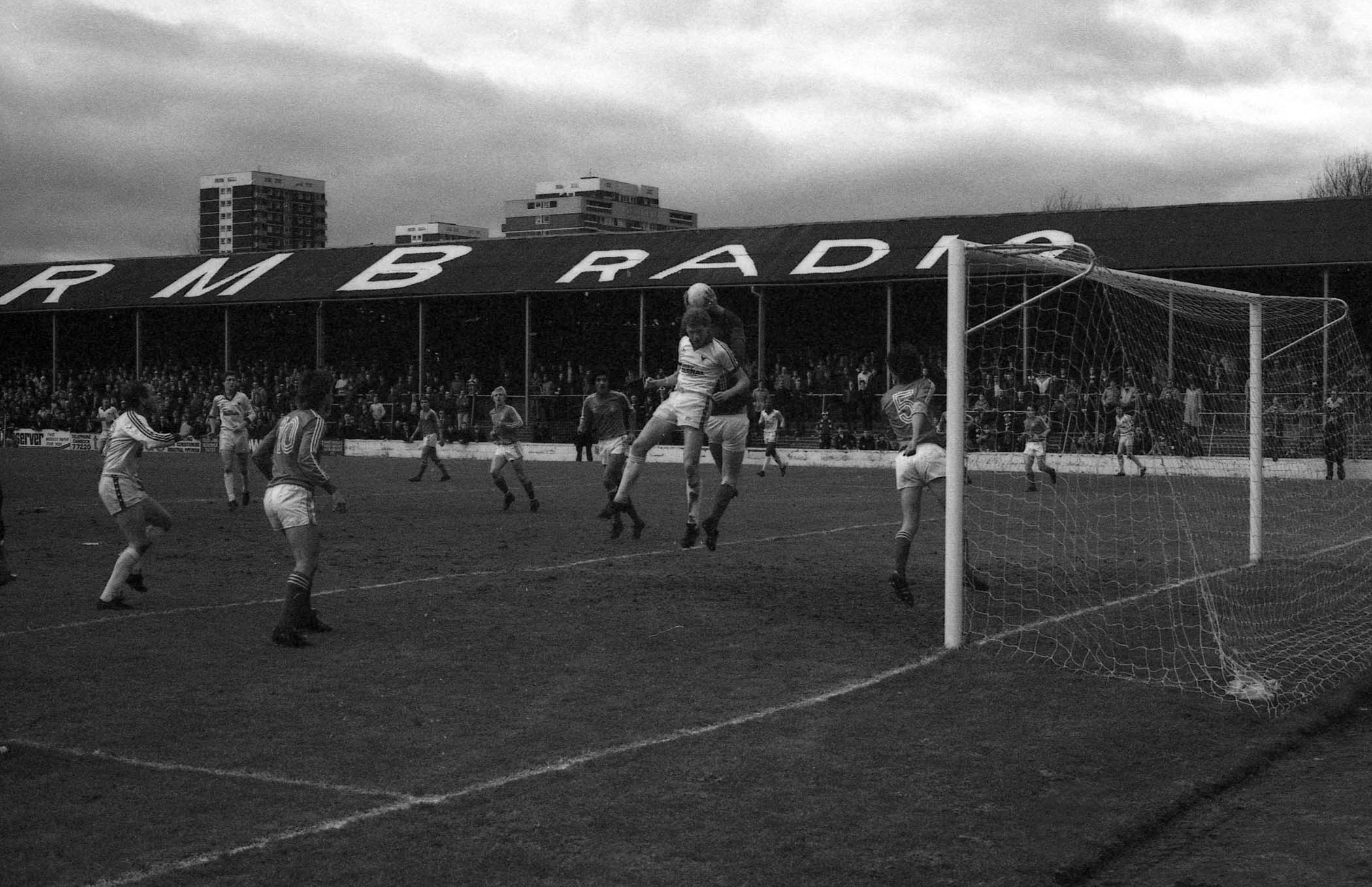
A lengthy unbeaten league run came to an end with defeat at Fellows Park, home of Walsall.

Gillingham's first match of the season was away to Sheffield United on 27 August; Leslie made his Gillingham debut, as did Andy Woodhead, a 17-year old defender from the club's youth team. Keith Edwards gave the home team the lead in the first half and then scored three more times in the second half to complete a 4–0 victory. The first league game of the season at Gillingham's ground, Priestfield Stadium, took place a week later against Hull City. Ray Daniel, a teenaged midfielder signed on loan from Luton Town, made his debut. Gillingham conceded a goal in the first half and, although Leslie equalised with his first goal for the club shortly after the interval, ultimately lost 2–1. Another loan player, Paul Garner, made his first appearance against Bolton Wanderers on 6 September in defence; Forward Tony Cascarino, the team's leading goalscorer in the previous season, made his first appearance of the campaign as a substitute for Garner. Goals from Dave Mehmet and Mark Weatherly gave Gillingham their first win of the season. Gillingham drew 1–1 with Plymouth Argyle on 10 September but then lost to both Oxford United and AFC Bournemouth. Fry made his debut against Bournemouth, replacing Ron Hillyard, who had been the team's first-choice goalkeeper since 1974. Steve Bruce, a defender who was only 22 years old but had already played nearly 200 games for Gillingham, returned to the team for the same game after missing the start of the season due to a broken leg. At the end of September, Gillingham were 22nd out of 24 teams in the Third Division league table.

Having lost their last two league games of September, Gillingham won their first five matches of October. They began the run by defeating Brentford 4–2 at Priestfield on 1 October with two goals from each of Leslie and Mehmet. A week later, Terry Cochrane, a winger newly signed on loan from Middlesbrough, made his debut and scored the first goal in a 2–0 victory at home to Preston North End. His move to Gillingham would be made permanent later in the month. Cochrane scored again in the next game away to Burnley; after taking a 2–0 lead, Gillingham conceded two goals, but Mehmet scored in the final five minutes to secure a 3–2 victory. Against Exeter City on 18 October, Gillingham scored twice in the first eight minutes and went on to win 3–1. A 2–1 victory away to Wigan Athletic four days later, in which Cochrane scored his third goal in his first four games for the team, meant that for the third consecutive season Gillingham had followed a slow start to the season by winning at least four league games in October. Draws away to Orient and at home to Millwall meant that at the end of the month Gillingham were 10th in the table.

Gillingham won 2–0 at home to Lincoln City on 5 November with goals from Jeff Johnson and Mehmet. A week later, their unbeaten run ended at eight games as they lost 3–1 away to Walsall; while travelling to the game, Clifford Grossmark, who had served as chairman of the club's board of directors for more than 20 years, suffered a heart attack and died, a fact which was not revealed to the players until after the match. In the next game, against Rotherham United, Gillingham took a 2–0 lead through goals from Weatherly and Mehmet but were reduced to ten men shortly before the end of the first half when Johnson was sent off. Although Rotherham scored twice after the interval, both Weatherly and Mehmet scored again and Gillingham won 4–2. Russell Musker, a midfielder signed from Bristol City, made his debut in the game. Gillingham began December with a 1–0 win away to Port Vale, Cochrane scoring the only goal of the game less than a minute from the start. Hillyard played his first game since September in a 2–0 defeat away to Scunthorpe United on 17 December. On Boxing Day, Gillingham achieved their biggest win of the season with a 5–1 victory at home to Southend United. It was the first time the team had scored more than four goals in a game since February 1982 and left them 9th in the league table. Gillingham ended 1983 with two defeats, losing 3–0 away to Bristol Rovers and 1–0 at home to Wimbledon on 31 December, the first time they had lost at Priestfield since mid-September. John Sharpe, a defender who had been a regular in the team since 1978, was injured against Bristol Rovers and would not play again for nearly a year. Cascarino, who had been out injured, returned to the side against Wimbledon. The result left Gillingham 11th in the table at the end of the calendar year.

=== January–May ===
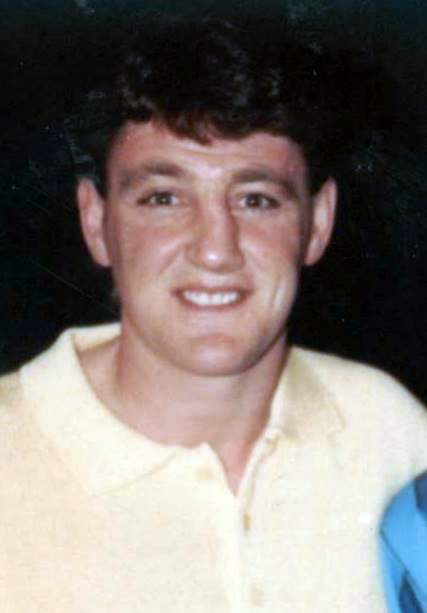
Steve Bruce scored twice in Gillingham's first league game of 1984.

Four of Gillingham's five league games originally scheduled for January were postponed, two of them because of the team's continuing involvement in the FA Cup, with the result that the team played only one Third Division match in the month, at home to Sheffield United. Bruce scored twice and Weatherly and Cochrane added a goal each as Gillingham took a 4–0 lead, but their team-mates John Sitton and Peter Shaw then both scored own goals; the game finished 4–2 to Gillingham. At the end of the month, Gillingham were 12th in the league table but had the advantage that they had between two and five more games still to play than every team above them. They secured a 3–2 win away to Brentford on 4 February and, despite conceding a goal inside the first minute, continued their unbeaten run a week later by beating AFC Bournemouth 2–1. The team's next two matches both ended in draws, 0–0 at home to Bradford City and 2–2 at home to Millwall, and they remained unbeaten in the Third Division in 1984 when two goals from Mehmet and one from Cascarino gave them a 3–0 victory at home to Wigan Athletic on 25 February. At the end of the month, Gillingham were 10th in the table, seven points below the top three places which would result in promotion, but still with the advantage of having played up to four fewer games than all the teams above them.^{[a]}

Gillingham began March with a match against Exeter City, who were 24th in the league table, but were held to a 0–0 draw, and their undefeated league run then came to an end as they were beaten 4–0 by Lincoln City. Gillingham fell further out of contention for the promotion places after losing 3–1 to Walsall on 10 March, a result which left them 13 points below third place. Four days later, Gillingham played away to Oxford United, who were top of the table. Phil Cavener, making his first appearance in the starting line-up, scored a goal inside the first minute and Gillingham won 1–0. It was the first time during the season that Oxford had failed to score in a home league game. Against Preston North End on 17 March, Gillingham scored two goals in the first half through Musker and Brian Sparrow, a defender making the final appearance of a loan spell from Arsenal, but conceded twice in the second half. The team's next two games both ended in 1–0 defeats, at home to Burnley and away to Newport County, meaning that they had won only once in the last seven games. Colin Clarke, a forward signed on loan from Peterborough United, made his debut against Burnley. In the last game of March, goals from Leslie and Mehmet, neither of whom had scored for over a month, and Cascarino secured a 3–1 win over Orient; despite the victory, Gillingham were again 13 points below third place.

A goal from Cascarino gave Gillingham a second consecutive win as they beat Bolton Wanderers 1–0 on 7 April, but it would prove to be the only victory they achieved in eight matches during the month. Four days later they lost 3–2 away to Bradford City after having been 2–1 up at half-time; Clarke scored the only goal of his eight-game loan spell. Weatherly, who had not played since sustaining a knee ligament injury in January, made his return as a substitute. Leslie scored a late equaliser to secure a draw against Port Vale on 14 April, and the next game against Hull City also ended in a draw. Gillingham's winless run continued on 20 April as they played 23rd-placed Southend United and lost 3–1. Against Bristol Rovers on 23 April, Musker scored an equaliser inside the final ten minutes after Gillingham had conceded a goal, but Bristol Rovers then scored again to win the game. Gillingham fell to a third consecutive defeat against Rotherham United and finished the game with ten men after Cochrane was sent off. Having gone six games without a victory, Gillingham won their first three games of May, beginning with a 2–1 defeat of Plymouth Argyle. In the next game, at home to Newport County on 5 May, Musker scored inside the first minute and Cascarino added two more goals before ten minutes of the match had elapsed; Gillingham went on to win 4–1. Two days later, Gillingham conceded a goal against second-placed Wimbledon just ten seconds after the start of the match, but came back to win 3–1. Gillingham's final game of the season was at home to Scunthorpe United on 12 May. Mehmet scored his 16th league goal of the season in a 1–1 draw which meant that Gillingham finished the season 8th in the league table, 13 points below the promotion places.

=== League match results ===
Key

- In result column, Gillingham's score shown first
- H = Home match
- A = Away match
- pen. = Penalty kick

Results
Date	Opponents	Result	Goalscorers	Attendance
27 August 1983	Sheffield United (A)	0–4		10,405
3 September 1983	Hull City (H)	1–2	Leslie	3,019
6 September 1983	Bolton Wanderers (H)	2–0	Mehmet, Weatherly	3,087
10 September 1983	Plymouth Argyle (A)	1–1	Sitton	3,192
17 September 1983	Oxford United (H)	2–3	Johnson, Sitton	3,370
24 September 1983	AFC Bournemouth (A)	0–2		3,045
1 October 1983	Brentford (H)	4–2	Leslie (2), Mehmet (2)	3,268
8 October 1983	Preston North End (H)	2–0	Cochrane, Weatherly	3,725
15 October 1983	Burnley (A)	3–2	Cochrane, Cascarino, Mehmet	5,462
18 October 1983	Exeter City (H)	3–1	Bruce, Weatherly (2)	3,943
22 October 1983	Wigan Athletic (A)	2–1	Cochrane, Weatherly	4,189
24 October 1983	Orient (A)	1–1	Cascarino	4,013
29 October 1983	Millwall (H)	3–3	Leslie, Sage, Mehmet	6,226
5 November 1983	Lincoln City (H)	2–0	Johnson, Mehmet (pen.)	4,428
12 November 1983	Walsall (A)	1–3	Cascarino	4,639
26 November 1983	Rotherham United (H)	4–2	Weatherly (2), Mehmet (2)	4,052
3 December 1983	Port Vale (A)	1–0	Cochrane	3,086
17 December 1983	Scunthorpe United (A)	0–2		2,127
26 December 1983	Southend United (H)	5–1	Weatherly, Musker, Mehmet (2), Bruce	5,511
27 December 1983	Bristol Rovers (A)	0–3		5,996
31 December 1983	Wimbledon (H)	0–1		5,054
14 January 1984	Sheffield United (H)	4–2	Bruce (2), Weatherly, Cochrane	5,408
4 February 1984	Brentford (A)	3–2	Musker, Cascarino, Leslie	4,317
11 February 1984	AFC Bournemouth (H)	2–1	Mehmet, Leslie	4,891
14 February 1984	Bradford City (H)	0–0		4,390
19 February 1984	Millwall (A)	2–2	Cascarino, Cochrane	6,344
25 February 1984	Wigan Athletic (H)	3–0	Mehmet (2), Cascarino	4,013
3 March 1984	Exeter City (A)	0–0		2,801
7 March 1984	Lincoln City (A)	0–4		1,575
10 March 1984	Walsall (H)	1–3	Cascarino	4,544
14 March 1984	Oxford United (A)	1–0	Cavener	7,433
17 March 1984	Preston North End (A)	2–2	Musker, Sparrow	3,874
24 March 1984	Burnley (H)	0–1		4,319
27 March 1984	Newport County (A)	0–1		1,849
31 March 1984	Orient (H)	3–1	Leslie, Cascarino, Mehmet	3,090
7 April 1984	Bolton Wanderers (A)	1–0	Cascarino	4,815
11 April 1984	Bradford City (A)	2–3	Mehmet, Clarke	3,523
14 April 1984	Port Vale (H)	1–1	Leslie	3,323
17 April 1984	Hull City (A)	0–0		9,179
20 April 1984	Southend United (A)	1–3	Sage	3,218
23 April 1984	Bristol Rovers (H)	1–2	Musker	3,400
28 April 1984	Rotherham United (A)	0–3		3,198
1 May 1984	Plymouth Argyle (H)	2–1	Leslie, Shaw	3,103
5 May 1984	Newport County (H)	4–1	Musker, Cascarino (2), Bruce (pen.)	3,073
7 May 1984	Wimbledon (A)	3–1	Bruce, Cascarino, Sitton	6,009
12 May 1984	Scunthorpe United (H)	1–1	Mehmet	3,513

=== Partial league table ===
Football League Third Division final table, leading positions
Pos	Team	Pld	W	D	L	GF	GA	GD	Pts	Promotion or relegation
1	Oxford United	46	28	11	7	91	50	+41	95	Division Champions, promoted
2	Wimbledon	46	26	9	11	97	76	+21	87	Promoted
3	Sheffield United	46	24	11	11	86	53	+33	83	Promoted
4	Hull City	46	23	14	9	71	38	+33	83	
5	Bristol Rovers	46	22	13	11	68	54	+14	79	
6	Walsall	46	22	9	15	68	61	+7	75	
7	Bradford City	46	20	11	15	73	65	+8	71	
8	Gillingham	46	20	10	16	74	69	+5	70	

== FA Cup ==
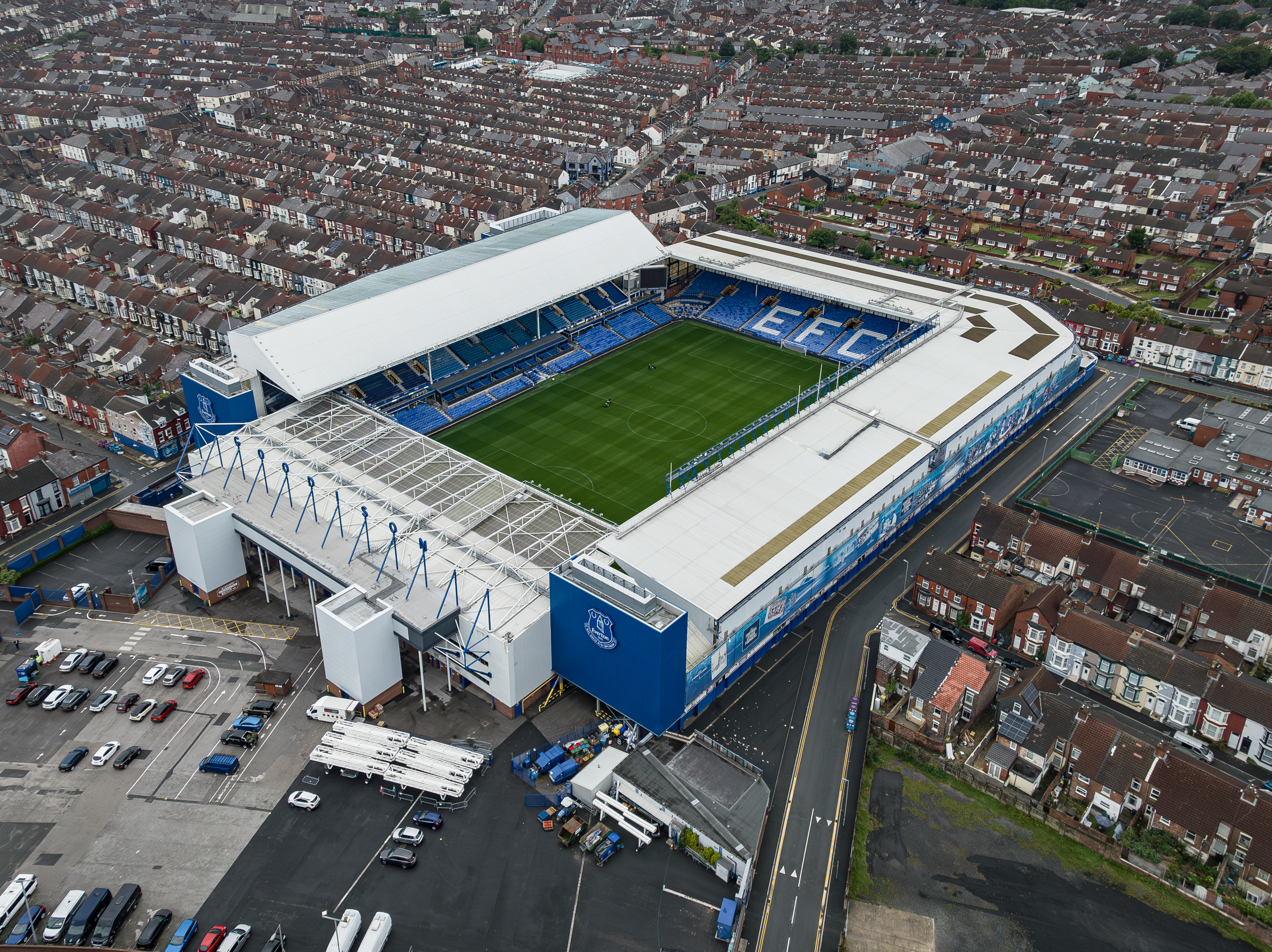
Gillingham achieved a goalless draw at Goodison Park (pictured in 2023), home of Everton of the First Division.

As a Third Division team, Gillingham entered the 1983–84 FA Cup at the first round stage; their opponents were AP Leamington of the Southern League, who had progressed through four qualifying rounds to reach this stage of the competition. A goal from Phil Handford gave Gillingham a 1–0 victory at Leamington's Windmill Gound and took them into the second round, where they faced another Southern League team, Chelmsford City, at Priestfield. Although Gillingham were held to a 1–0 lead at half-time, they scored five times after the interval and won 6–1. Gillingham's third round opponents were fellow Third Division team Brentford; with less than 15 minutes of the match at Priestfield remaining, Brentford were winning 3–1 and seemed set for victory, but Gillingham scored four goals in the final 11 minutes to secure a 5–3 win and reach the fourth round (last 32) of the competition for only the third time in the club's history.

Gillingham's opponents in the fourth round were Everton of the First Division, the highest tier of English football. The match took place at Everton's ground, Goodison Park, and Gillingham held their higher-level opponents to a goalless draw, meaning that a replay at Priestfield was required. The second match was also goalless at the end of the regulation 90 minutes and went into extra time. Shortly before the end of the additional period, a long clearance out of the Gillingham defence reached Cascarino, who found himself in the clear with only Everton's goalkeeper Neville Southall to beat, but the Gillingham forward hit a weak shot which was blocked by Southall and the final score was again 0–0. In a review of Cascarino's autobiography, published sixteen years later, Dave Hill of the magazine When Saturday Comes described the moment as "one of the great misses [of all time]"; in the book Cascarino himself attributed it to a sudden attack of self-doubt at the crucial moment, writing "Panic was clouding my brain like a fog. [Southall] narrowed the angle and stood his ground. Impulsively I reached for the trigger and kicked an awful shot that almost dribbled into his hands". As Gillingham won a coin toss to decide the venue of the second replay, it also took place at Priestfield. The match resulted in a 3–0 victory for Everton, ending Gillingham's participation in the FA Cup for the season. The reporter for The Daily Telegraph wrote that Gillingham's decision after winning the coin toss for the choice of ends to play with a strong wind behind them in the first half backfired as it led to them relying too much on long-range shots which lacked accuracy. The gate receipts of £35,070 (equivalent to £110,000 in 2025) for the second replay were a new club record.

=== FA Cup match results ===
Key

- In result column, Gillingham's score shown first
- H = Home match
- A = Away match

Results
Date	Round	Opponents	Result	Goalscorers	Attendance
19 November 1983	First	AP Leamington (A)	1–0	Handford	2,223
10 December 1983	Second	Chelmsford City (H)	6–1	Shaw, Bruce, Sage, Weatherly, Mehmet, Leslie	4,812
7 January 1984	Third	Brentford (H)	5–3	Cochrane, Musker, Weatherly, Leslie, Cascarino	6,509
28 January 1984	Fourth	Everton (A)	0–0		22,380
31 January 1984	Fourth (replay)	Everton (H)	0–0 (a.e.t.)		15,339
6 February 1984	Fourth (second replay)	Everton (H)	0–3		17,817

== Football League Cup ==
As a Third Division team, Gillingham entered the 1983–84 Football League Cup at the first round stage and were drawn to play Chelsea of the Second Division. The first leg of the two-legged tie took place at Priestfield on 30 August; Shaw scored for Gillingham in the first half and the score was 1–1 at half time, but Chelsea scored a second goal after the interval. The second leg took place two weeks later at Stamford Bridge and resulted in a 4–0 victory for Chelsea, making the aggregate score 6–1 and eliminating Gillingham from the competition. Kerry Dixon scored all the goals in the second leg, making him the second player inside three weeks to score four times in a game against Gillingham.

=== Football League Cup match results ===
Key

- In result column, Gillingham's score shown first
- H = Home match
- A = Away match

Results
Date	Round	Opponents	Result	Goalscorers	Attendance
30 August 2023	First (first leg)	Chelsea (H)	1–2	Shaw	8,633
13 September 2023	First (second leg)	Chelsea (A)	0–4		9,704

== Associate Members' Cup ==
Gillingham entered the 1983–84 Associate Members' Cup, a new competition exclusively for Third and Fourth Division clubs, at the first round stage and were paired with fellow Third Division side Millwall; the match took place nine days after the teams had drawn 2–2 in the league. Both teams scored two goals in the first half and a third after half-time; with the scores level after 90 minutes the match went into extra time. With three minutes of the additional period remaining, 17-year old Teddy Sheringham scored to give Millwall a 4–3 win, meaning that Gillingham were eliminated from the tournament.

=== Associate Members' Cup match results ===
Key

- In result column, Gillingham's score shown first
- H = Home match
- A = Away match

Results
Date	Round	Opponents	Result	Goalscorers	Attendance
28 February 1984	First	Millwall (A)	3–4 (a.e.t.)	Cascarino (2), Sparrow	2,364

== Player details ==
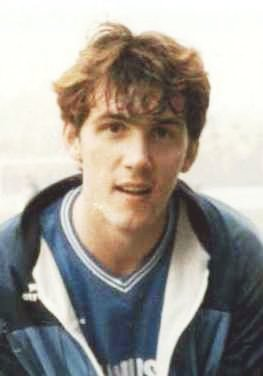
Tony Cascarino was the team's second-highest goalscorer.

During the season, 28 players made at least one appearance for Gillingham. Leslie made the most, playing in 54 of the team's 55 competitive matches. Mehmet and Sitton also played 50 or more times, and another six players made 40 or more appearances. Seven players made fewer than five appearances, four of whom played only once. Mehmet was the team's top goalscorer, scoring 16 times in the league and once in the FA Cup. Cascarino scored 15 goals and Weatherly and Leslie also reached double figures.

Player statistics
Player	Position	Third Division		FA Cup		Football League Cup		Associate Members' Cup		Total	
Player	Position	Apps	Goals	Apps	Goals	Apps	Goals	Apps	Goals	Apps	Goals
Gary Armstrong	DF	8	0	2	0	0	0	0	0	10	0
Richie Bowman	MF	0	0	0	0	1	0	0	0	1	0
Steve Bruce	DF	40	6	6	1	0	0	0	0	46	7
Tony Cascarino	FW	37	12	5	1	1	0	1	2	44	15
Phil Cavener	MF	10	1	0	0	0	0	1	0	11	1
Colin Clarke	FW	8	1	0	0	0	0	0	0	8	1
Terry Cochrane	MF	34	6	6	1	0	0	0	0	40	7
Paul Collins	MF	0	0	0	0	0	0	1	0	1	0
Ray Daniel	DF	5	0	0	0	0	0	0	0	5	0
Colin Duncan	MF	1	0	0	0	0	0	0	0	1	0
David Fry	GK	38	0	6	0	0	0	0	0	44	0
Paul Garner	DF	5	0	0	0	0	0	0	0	5	0
Phil Handford	MF	20	0	1	1	2	0	1	0	24	1
Ron Hillyard	GK	8	0	0	0	2	0	1	0	11	0
Jeff Johnson	MF	32	2	5	0	1	0	0	0	38	2
John Leslie	FW	45	9	6	2	2	0	1	0	54	11
Dave Mehmet	MF	43	16	6	1	2	0	0	0	51	17
Russell Musker	MF	27	5	5	1	0	0	1	0	33	6
Mel Sage	DF	40	2	4	1	2	0	1	0	47	3
Allen Scotting	DF	2	0	0	0	0	0	1	0	3	0
John Sharpe	DF	16	0	1	0	2	0	1	0	20	0
Peter Shaw	DF	33	1	5	1	2	1	0	0	40	3
John Sitton	DF	42	3	5	0	2	0	1	0	50	3
Brian Sparrow	DF	5	1	2	0	0	0	1	1	8	2
Wayne Stokes	DF	1	0	0	0	0	0	0	0	1	0
Dick Tydeman	MF	2	0	0	0	2	0	0	0	4	0
Mark Weatherly	DF	32	9	4	2	2	0	0	0	38	11
Andy Woodhead	DF	2	0	0	0	1	0	1	0	4	0

FW = Forward, MF = Midfielder, GK = Goalkeeper, DF = Defender

== Aftermath ==
For the second consecutive season, Bruce was voted into the Professional Footballers' Association Team of the Year for the Third Division by his fellow professionals. Having attracted the attention of several First Division clubs with his performances, the defender left Gillingham at the end of the season to join Norwich City for a fee of £135,000. Shaw won the club's own Player of the Season award. Writing in the matchday programme for the final game of the season, Peacock contended that injuries restricting the players available for selection had been the primary reason for the decline in the team's performances in the final months of the season and their inability to remain in contention for promotion. He added that the club was "close to developing a side with genuine promotion potential". The following season, Gillingham matched their best performance since returning to the Third Division, finishing fourth and missing out on promotion by one place. It would not be until 2000 that the club reached the second level of English football for the first time.

== Footnotes ==
a. As three points were awarded for winning a match, Gillingham's four games in hand represented a potential advantage of up to 12 points over teams above them.
