= Peter Sanders =

Peter Sanders may refer to:

- Peter Sanders (cyclist) (born 1961), British Olympic cyclist
- Peter Sanders (sportsman) (born 1942), Welsh former association football and rugby union player
- Peter Sanders (Indian Army officer) (1911–2003)
- Peter Sanders (computer scientist) (born 1967), German professor
- Peter Sanders (photographer), British photographer
- Peter Sanders (filmmaker), American filmmaker
