= Musker =

Musker is a surname. Notable people with the surname include:

- Frank Musker (born 1951), American songwriter and composer
- John Musker (born 1953), American animation director, screenwriter, and producer
- Russell Musker (born 1962), English footballer
