= Sly =

Sly or SLY may refer to:

== People ==
- Sly (surname)
- Sly Bailey (born 1962), British businesswoman
- Sly Dunbar (1952–2026), Jamaican drummer
- Sylvain Grenier (born 1977), Canadian wrestler
- Sylvester Igboun (born 1990), Nigerian footballer, nicknamed "Sly"
- Sylvester Stallone (born 1946), American actor
- Sly Stone (1943–2025), American musician in Sly and the Family Stone

== Music ==
- Sly (opera), by Ermanno Wolf-Ferrari
- "Sly" (The Cat Empire song)
- "Sly" (Massive Attack song)
- Sly (band), a Japanese heavy metal band

== Gaming ==
- The Sly Cooper series, including:
  - Sly Cooper and the Thievius Raccoonus
  - Sly 2: Band of Thieves
  - Sly 3: Honor Among Thieves
  - Sly Cooper: Thieves in Time

== Other ==
- sly, ISO 639-3 code for the Selayar language, Indonesia
- Sly syndrome, a genetic disease
- Sly (film), a 2023 documentary film about Sylvester Stallone
