= Pybus =

Pybus is a surname. Notable people with this name include:

- Cassandra Pybus (born 1947), Australian historian and author
- Charles Small Pybus (1766–1810), English barrister and politician
- Dan Pybus (born 1997), English footballer
- Dave Pybus (born 1970), English musician
- Frederick Charles Pybus (1883–1975), English surgeon
- George Pybus (1911–2001), English footballer
- John Pybus (1880–1935), British politician
- Oliver Pybus (born 1974), British biologist
- Richard Pybus (born 1964), English-born cricket coach
- Sean A. Pybus (born 1957), American Navy officer
- W. R. Pybus (1848–1917), South Australian organist
