= Neyland (surname) =

Neyland is a surname. Notable people with the surname include:

- Martin Neyland (1877–1947), English footballer
- Robert Neyland (1892–1962), American football coach
- Tara Neyland (born 1994), Australian para-cyclist
