= Sinning =

Sinning may refer to:

- Sin, a transgression against divine law
- Sinning, a community in the municipality of Oberhausen, Bavaria, Germany
- Arthur Sinning (1902–1985), English footballer
- "Sinning", a 1979 song by Grace Jones from Muse
