= Brian Gregory (disambiguation) =

Brian Gregory (born 1966) is an American basketball executive and former coach.

Brian or Bryan Gregory may also refer to:

- Brian Gregory (footballer) (born 1955), Irish footballer
- Brian Gregory (rugby league) (c. 1949–2002), rugby league player
- Bryan Gregory (1951–2001), American rock musician
