= Kane Haysman =

English footballer

Personal information
- Full name: Kane Cruz Haysman
- Date of birth: 29 December 1994 (age 31)
- Place of birth: Stepney, London, England
- Position: Midfielder

Team information
- Current team: Margate

Youth career
- ?–2013: Gillingham

Senior career*
Years	Team	Apps	(Gls)
2013–2014	Gillingham	1	(0)
2013	→ Sutton United (loan)	20	(2)
2014	Sutton United	12	(1)
2014–2016	Eastbourne Borough	52	(6)
2016	Staines Town	15	(2)
2016–2017	Chelmsford City	13	(3)
2017	→ Kingstonian (dual-registration)	10	(6)
2017–	Margate	19	(7)
- * Club domestic league appearances and goals as of 00:00, 9 February 2017 (UTC)

Kane Cruz Haysman (born 14 September 1995) is an English footballer who plays for Margate.

== Career ==
Haysman began his career with Gillingham and made his professional debut on 27 April 2013 in a 3–2 defeat against Burton Albion in Football League Two, replacing Nathan Nyafli as a substitute. Twice during the 2013–14 season he was loaned to Sutton United of the Conference South, scoring three times in five matches during his first spell before being recalled to his parent club as a result of Martin Allen's departure. In November 2013, Haysman was sent on loan to Sutton United again.

Haysman was released by Sutton on 27 November 2014 and subsequently joined league rivals Eastbourne Borough. Haysman made his debut for Borough in a 2–1 loss to Havant & Waterlooville on 6 December 2014.

Haysman joined Staines Town of the Isthmian League Premier Division in June 2016.

He joined Chelmsford City of the National League South in December 2016. On 1 September 2017, Haysman joined Isthmian Premier Division side Kingstonian on dual-registration. Haysman scored the opener eight minutes into his Kingstonian debut, on the same day as signing, in a 3–2 FA Cup win against Shoreham.
