= Sly (surname) =

Sly or Slye is the surname of:

People:

- Allan Sly (born 1951), sculptor
- Allan Sly (mathematician), probability theorist and MacArthur Fellow
- Darryl Sly (1939–2007), Canadian National Hockey League player
- Damon Slye (born 1962), computer game designer, director and programmer
- Harold Sly (1904–1996), English professional association football player
- James Calvin Sly (1807–1864), Mormon pioneer, scout, settler and missionary
- Leonard Slye, birth name of Roy Rogers (1911–1998), America singer and actor
- Maud Slye (1879–1954), American pathologist
- Philippe Sly, Canadian singer
- Richard Meares Sly (1849–1929), Australian judge
- Tony Sly (1970–2012), American singer, songwriter and guitarist, best known as the frontman of the punk rock band No Use for a Name
- William Sly (died 1608), Elizabethan actor and colleague of William Shakespeare
- William S. Sly (1932–2025), American physician and scientist

Fictional characters:

- Christopher Sly, in Shakespeare's play The Taming of the Shrew
