= William Wilson (footballer, born November 1915) =

English footballer

Personal information
- Date of birth: November 1915
- Place of birth: Rotherham, England
- Height: 5 ft 9 in (1.75 m)
- Position: Wing half

Senior career*
| Years | Team | Apps | (Gls) |
- Scarborough
- Scunthorpe & Lindsey United
- Frickley Colliery
| 1933–1934 | Rotherham United | 11 | (0) |
| 1934–1936 | Bristol Rovers | 6 | (0) |
| 1936–1937 | Gillingham | 5 | (0) |
- * Club domestic league appearances and goals

William Wilson (November 1915 – after 1936) was an English professional footballer who played as a wing half.

== Career ==
Born in Rotherham, Wilson played for Scarborough, Scunthorpe & Lindsey United, Frickley Colliery, hometown club Rotherham United, Bristol Rovers and Gillingham. In total he made 22 appearances in The Football League.
