= Jeffrey Turton =

English footballer

Personal information
- Date of birth: 21 April 1912
- Place of birth: Wortley, England
- Date of death: 17 March 1981 (aged 68)
- Height: 5 ft 10 in (1.78 m)
- Position: Full back

Senior career*
Years	Team	Apps	(Gls)
1933–1934	Chapeltown		
1934–1935	West Bromwich Albion	0	(0)
1935–1936	Gillingham	11	(0)
1936–1938	Crystal Palace	12	(0)
1938–1939	Folkestone		
1939–1940	Chelmsford City	1	(0)
- * Club domestic league appearances and goals

Jeffrey Turton (21 April 1912 — 17 March 1981) was an English professional footballer who played as a full back.

== Career ==
Turton began his career at Chapeltown in 1933, signing for West Bromwich Albion the following year. In 1935, after failing to make any appearances for West Brom, Turton signed for Gillingham. Turton made 11 Football League appearances at Gillingham, signing for Crystal Palace in February 1936. At Crystal Palace, Turton made 12 league appearances over the course of two seasons, before signing for non-league side Folkestone in 1938. In 1939, Turton signed for Chelmsford City.
