= James McWhirr =

Scottish footballer

James S. McWhirr (13 January 1905 – 1976) was a Scottish professional footballer of the 1920s who played as an outside right. Born in Partick, he joined Gillingham from Glasgow-based club Ashfield in 1925 and went on to make six appearances for the club in the English Football League. He left to join Norwich City in 1926.
