= George Wakefield =

English footballer

George Edward Wakefield was an English professional footballer. After an unsuccessful spell with Bradford City, where he failed to make the first team, he moved to Gillingham and made ten Football League appearances in the 1921–22 season before apparently dropping out of the professional game.
