= Peter Sanders (Indian Army officer) =

Lt Colonel Peter Sanders, DSO (23 October 1911 – 19 September 2003), who lost an arm policing the Indian-Afghan frontier in 1939 before winning a DSO at the Battle of Imphal in 1944 while commanding Gurkha infantry in several hard-fought battles.

== Early life ==
Geoffrey Peter Vere Sanders was born at Abbottabad, in North-West Frontier Province. The son and grandson of Gurkha officers, he was educated at Blundell's School in Tiverton and at RMC Sandhurst, and was commissioned in January 1932 into the 1st Battalion 5th Royal Gurkha Rifles (Frontier Force), the regiment in which his father, who had won a DSO in the First World War, and grandfather had served.

Sanders remained with his battalion until 1937, when he was seconded to the Tochi scouts – a corps of Pathan irregulars commanded by British officers, and assigned to patrol and police the troubled Indian-Afghan frontier. The young officers who commanded such units assumed much greater responsibility than they would have had with their parent units, and Sanders first saw action here against Waziri tribesmen. In 1939, while clearing a booby-trap, he lost his right arm. Some time later he was invited to a tikala (lunch) by the Pathan who had laid the trap; an apology was offered and accepted, in the tradition of border warfare.

== Battle of Imphal ==
Sanders' obituary records his actions at the Battle of Imphal and his later wartime career:

The breaking of the Japanese offensive against Imphal – an offensive which might have led to a full-scale invasion of India – was the turning point of the Burma campaign. In February 1944 Sanders, then a Major in the 3rd/5th Gurkhas, had been appointed to command the 1st/7th Gurkhas and had had little time to get to know his men. The battalion was under orders to assault a Japanese position known as "Bare Patch". This position (also known to the Gurkhas as "Nango") was a strongly held network of trenches and bunkers on high ground east of the Tiddim-Fort White road.

On the night of 6/7 February, Sanders led his men down a difficult winding path for 1,500 ft, before beginning a 1,200 ft climb up to the objective. There was no path, and it was so steep that both hands had to be used – a considerable challenge for Sanders, who had lost an arm in action on the North-West Frontier five years earlier; all stores had to be carried by the men.

When the assault began at 8.30 pm, there was fierce resistance. Repeated efforts to find a way into or around the enemy's elaborate defences were unsuccessful, and Sanders decided to dig in on the rocky ground just 20 yards from the Japanese trenches and to hold on till dawn. A thick morning mist gave his men the chance to consolidate their positions and do some wiring but, as the day progressed, casualties mounted from enemy light machine-gun and mortar fire, and from sniping and grenade attacks.

Under Sanders's leadership the Gurkhas held their ground throughout the day and night, while aggressive patrolling around the Japanese flanks succeeded in locating their water point. By 9 February, the 1/7th's position was completely wired; Japanese grenade dischargers during that day had no effect, and the Gurkhas were replying with 2 in mortars.

The battalion had begun moving round the enemy's right flank, and by 2.20 pm on 10 February the Japanese – now denied water and almost completely surrounded – began pulling out. Just over an hour later, the position was clear of the enemy. "Throughout this very hazardous operation," his brigade commander reported, "Major Sanders set such a magnificent personal example of courage and grim tenacity of purpose that he inspired the whole force."

A month later, now back with his own battalion as second-in-command, Sanders led a counter-attack at mile 100, on the Tiddim road. Taking charge of a company whose commander had been wounded, he drove the enemy off ground they had only just captured, close to his battalion's main position. In the course of this action Sanders was severely wounded. For this and numerous other actions over the previous two years, he was awarded the DSO, which was presented in person by Mountbatten.

After a period as an instructor at the Frontier Warfare School, in 1942 Sanders became involved in the formation of a third battalion of his regiment, with which – apart from his period in command of 1st/7th Gurkhas – he remained for the rest of his military service.

Moving with the 3rd/5th to Imphal in 1942, he was almost continually in action against the Japanese until the end of the war. After the action at "Bare Patch" he went on to command the 3rd/5th, notably at the capture of "Rajput" or "Lone Tree" Hill in the Shenam area. After the Japanese surrender in August 1945, Sanders took his battalion to Malaya to oversee the surrender of several thousand Japanese troops. From there he went to Java, where he met and married, in November 1946, Cornelia "Corrie" Ronteltap, who had been a prisoner in various Japanese camps.

The situation in the Dutch East Indies was very unstable, with armed bodies of Indonesian nationalists determined to prevent a return to Dutch rule. In some places the disarming of the Japanese was postponed as they assisted the Indian Army in maintaining law and order, and Sanders had to carry out air reconnaissance in a Japanese plane with a Japanese pilot.

== Post war ==
In 1947 Sanders left the Army and sailed to England with his wife and their first daughter. After a brief experiment with fruit farming, he joined the Suffolk-based Greene King Brewery, and in 1953 became brewery manager at Cambridge.

Sanders was President of the 5th Royal Gurkha Rifles Association from 1992 to 1995, and of the Cambridge Branch of BLESMA (the British Limbless Ex-Servicemen's Association) from 1964 to 1999.

== Sources ==
- Extracted from the obituary of Lieutenant Colonel Peter Sanders, The Daily Telegraph, 21 October, 2003
- Obituary of Lieutenant-Colonel G. P. V. Sanders, The Times, 4 November, 2003
