= Harry Samuel Bickerton Brindley =

British engineer

Sir Harry Samuel Bickerton Brindley KBE (1867–1920) was a British engineer, armaments businessman and manufacturer.

== Life ==
Brindley was born in September 1867 in Handsworth, near Birmingham. His father, G. S. Brindley, was an engineer and mechanics instructor at the Imperial College of Engineering in Japan, where the young Brindley was raised and educated. He graduated from Tokyo University with an engineering degree in 1883.

== Career ==
While living in Tokyo, he received a United States patent in 1902 for a hydraulic or other fluid controlling valve.

In 1915, Brindley assumed management of the Ponders End Shell Works, devoted to World War I production. After the war, Winston Churchill wrote that Brindley's work at Ponders end "proved of the highest value to the Ministry of Munitions, and he has succeeded in a remarkable degree in enlisting the enthusiasm of the workers in the manufacture of shells."

Following the war, Brindley sought to share the methods of industrial efficiency that he had developed at Ponder's end. In 1919 he was a co-initiator of the British Institute of Industrial Administration.

== Freemasonry ==
After the war, Ponders End employees petitioned the Freemasons for a lodge to be named after Brindley. The request was successful, after it was supported by Winston Churchill. Brindley was chosen to be the first Master.

== Death and knighthood ==
Brindley died on 28 March 1920. Three days after his death, Brindley was posthumously gazetted as a Knight Commander of the British Empire.
