= Brindley Farm =

Historic house in Delaware, US

- U.S. National Register of Historic Places
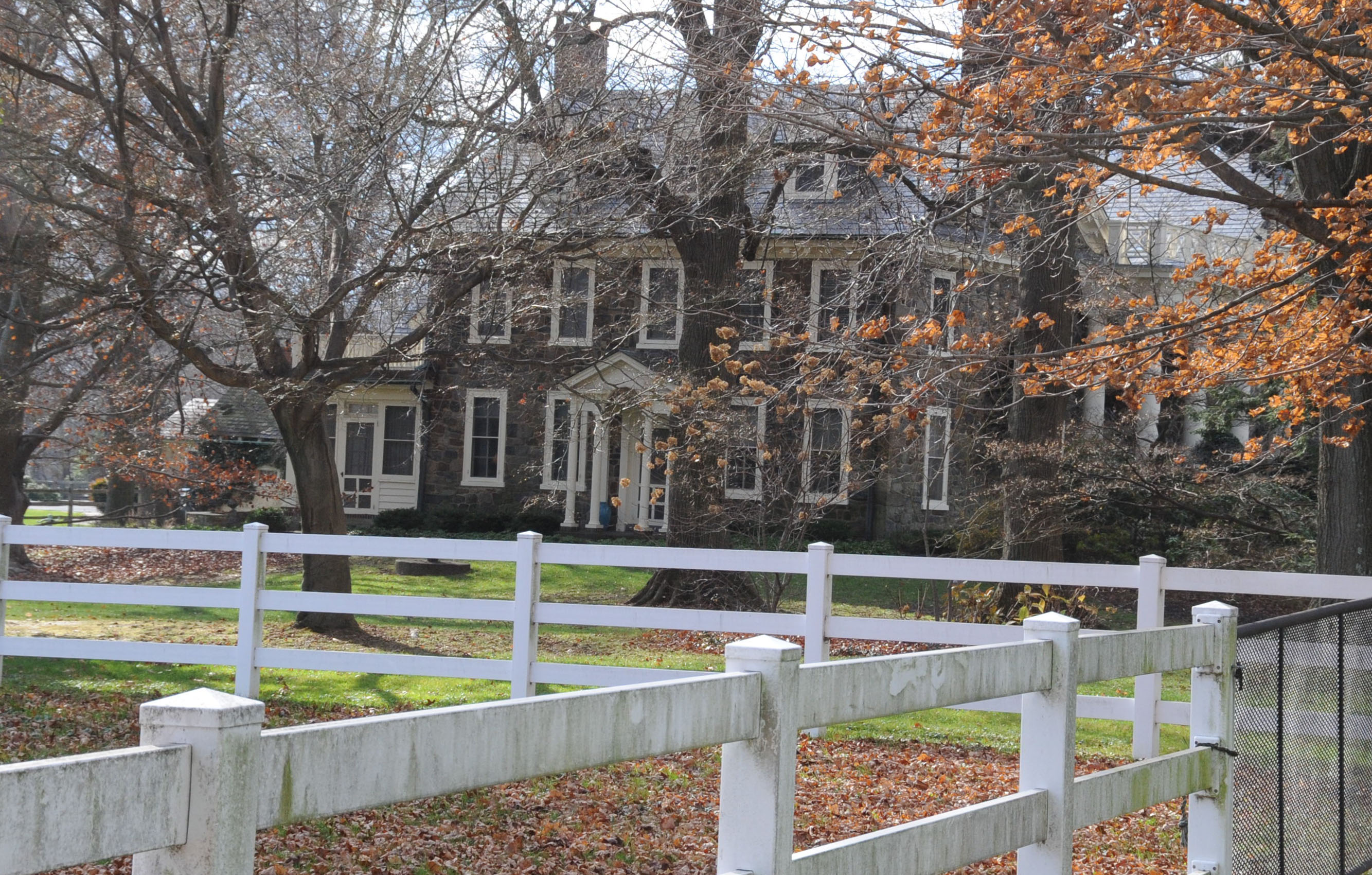

- Location within Delaware Location within the United States
- Location: 3510 Kennett Pike, near Wilmington, Delaware
- Coordinates: 39°46′13″N 75°35′35″W
- Area: 28.3 acres (11.5 ha)
- Built: c. 1750, 1807
- NRHP reference No.: 76000575
- Added to NRHP: September 28, 1976

Brindley Farm is a historic home and farm located near Wilmington in New Castle County, Delaware, United States. The house, known as Crooked Billet, was built about 1750, and is a 2 1/2-story, five-bay, stone structure, with later rear wings and a modern side porch. Also on the property are a contributing frame barn and carriage house, dated to 1807. The property has been owned by only two families since 1750, and the house once operated as an inn or tavern. The Du Pont family has owned the property since 1864.

It was added to the National Register of Historic Places in 1976.
