= Aaron Millbank =

English footballer (born 1995)

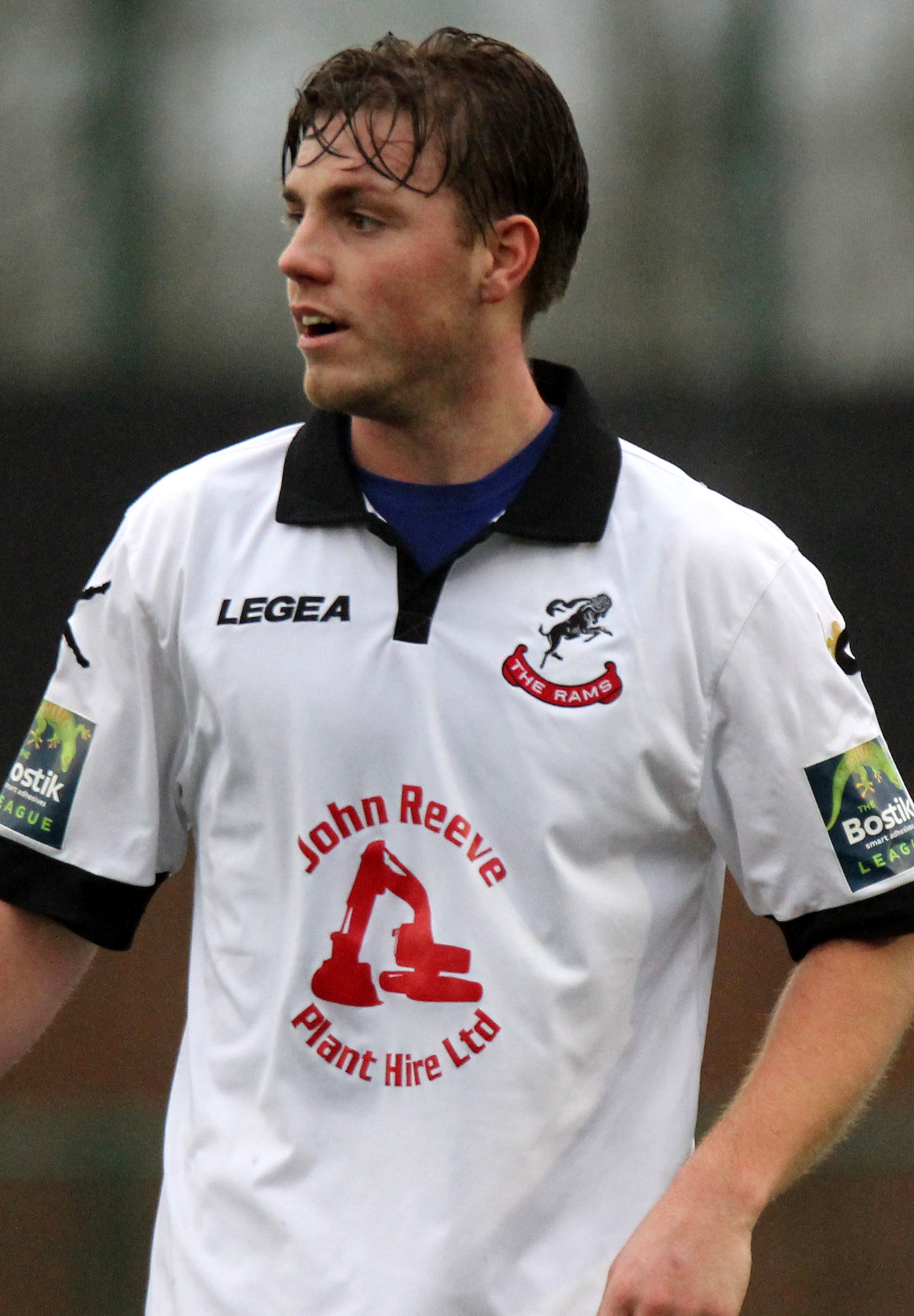
- Millbank in action for Ramsgate in January 2018

Personal information
- Full name: Aaron Craig Millbank
- Date of birth: 4 February 1995 (age 31)
- Place of birth: Ramsgate, Kent, England
- Position: Forward

Youth career
- 2006–2012: Gillingham

Senior career*
Years	Team	Apps	(Gls)
2012–2016	Gillingham	1	(0)
2012–2013	→ Herne Bay (loan)	3	(0)
2013–2014	→ Ramsgate (loan)	22	(8)
2016–2019	Ramsgate		
2019–2021	Whitstable Town	39	(15)
2021–2022	Herne Bay	31	(4)
2022–2026	Deal Town	70	(35)
Total		166+	(62+)
- * Club domestic league appearances and goals as of 17:19, 31 May 2024 (UTC)

Aaron Craig Millbank (born 4 February 1995) is an English former footballer who played as a forward.

== Career ==
Millbank started his career in the youth system of Gillingham and signed a two-and-a-half-year scholarship in 2011, after spending five years with the youth team. In December 2012, Millbank joined Isthmian League Division One South side Herne Bay on a one-month loan. Millbank returned to the "Gills" in January 2012 having made three appearances. In October 2013, Millbank joined Isthmian League Division One South side Ramsgate on work experience. He impressed during his spell with his hometown club, scoring eight goals in 26 appearances. In February 2014, Millbank was recalled by Gillingham for inclusion in the first team squad. Millbank made his professional debut for Gillingham in May 2014, replacing Cody McDonald in a 1–1 draw with Shrewsbury Town. He then went on to sign his first professional contract in the month, on a one-year deal.

In September 2021, he signed for Whitstable Town's rivals Herne Bay, turning down higher wages from elsewhere to sign for the Oystermen and he went straight into the side that beat Corinthian 1–0. On 30 April 2022, Millbank scored as Herne Bay defeated Ashford United in the play-off final to earn promotion to the Isthmian League Premier Division.

On 8 August 2022, Millbank signed for Southern Counties East League Premier Division club Deal Town.

Millbank announced his retirement at the end of the 2025–26 season due to injury.

== Personal life ==
Millbank was born in Ramsgate, Kent, and attended St Georges C of E Foundation School in Broadstairs. He is a supporter of West Ham United.

== Career statistics ==
As of match played 3 May 2014.

Club statistics
Club	Season	League			FA Cup		League Cup		Other		Total	
Club	Season	Division	Apps	Goals	Apps	Goals	Apps	Goals	Apps	Goals	Apps	Goals
Gillingham	2012–13	League Two	0	0	0	0	0	0	0	0	0	0
Gillingham	2013–14	League One	1	0	0	0	0	0	0	0	1	0
Gillingham	Total		1	0	0	0	0	0	0	0	1	0
Herne Bay (loan)	2012–13	Isthmian League Division One South	3	0	0	0	—		0	0	3	0
Ramsgate (loan)	2013–14	Isthmian League Division One South	22	8	0	0	—		4 (Note: 3 appearances in FA Trophy, 1 appearance in Isthmian League Cup)	0	26	8
Career total			26	8	0	0	0	0	4	0	30	8
