= William Arnold (footballer) =

English footballer

William John Arnold (1 March 1900 – 1977) was an English professional footballer of the 1920s. Born in Bromley, he joined Gillingham in 1922 and scored a goal on his debut against Swansea Town on 30 September of that year. He played again in the club's next match a week later but then never appeared for the first team again.
