= Dave Huddart =

English footballer

David Joseph Huddart (born 18 November 1937) is an English former professional footballer of the 1960s. He played professionally for Aldershot and Gillingham and made a total of 10 appearances in the Football League.
