= Tommy Williams (footballer, born 1899) =

English footballer

Personal information
- Full name: Thomas Hutchinson Williams
- Date of birth: 23 May 1899
- Place of birth: Ryhope, England
- Date of death: 1960 (aged 60–61)
- Position: Inside forward

Senior career*
Years	Team	Apps	(Gls)
1919–1920	Ryhope Colliery		
1920–1921	Huddersfield Town	0	(0)
1921–1923	Clapton Orient	26	(6)
1923–1924	Charlton Athletic	5	(2)
1924	Gillingham	16	(6)
1924–1925	Ashington	10	(4)
1925	Mid Rhondda United		
1925–1929	Bristol Rovers	75	(28)
1928–1929	Bristol City	8	(4)
1929–1930	Merthyr Town	46	(19)
1930–1932	Norwich City	27	(13)
1933	Easington Colliery		
1934	Frost's Athletic		
Total		213	(83)
- * Club domestic league appearances and goals

Thomas Hutchinson Williams (23 May 1899 – 1960) was an English footballer who played in the Football League for Ashington, Bristol City, Bristol Rovers, Charlton Athletic, Clapton Orient, Gillingham, Merthyr Town and Norwich City.
