= Bud Rossiter =

English footballer

Ambrose "Bud" Rossiter (24 November 1907 – September 1993) was an English professional footballer. Born in Ashford, Kent, he joined Gillingham from Crystal Palace in 1935 and went on to make 19 appearances for the club in The Football League. He left to join Clapton Orient in 1936. He was 5 ft 10 1/2 in (1.79 m) tall.
