= Stephen Butcher (footballer) =

English footballer

Personal information
- Full name: Stephen James Butcher
- Date of birth: 19 November 1994 (age 31)
- Place of birth: Dover, England
- Position: Right-back

Team information
- Current team: Ramsgate

Youth career
- ?–2013: Gillingham

Senior career*
Years	Team	Apps	(Gls)
2013–2014	Gillingham	1	(0)
2014	→ Maidstone United	5	(0)
2014–	Maidstone United	0	(0)
- * Club domestic league appearances and goals as of 00:00, 18 August 2013 (UTC)

Stephen James Butcher (born 19 November 1994) is an English semi-professional footballer who plays at right-back for Ramsgate.

== Playing career ==
Butcher made his debut for Gillingham on 3 August 2013, replacing Matt Fish five minutes into a 1–0 defeat to Colchester United at Priestfield Stadium. In March 2014 Butcher joined Maidstone United on loan until the end of the season, and following his release from Gillingham he joined the Stones on a permanent deal in June 2014.

== Statistics ==
Season	Club	Division	League		FA Cup		League Cup		Other		Total	
Season	Club	Division	Apps	Goals	Apps	Goals	Apps	Goals	Apps	Goals	Apps	Goals
2013–14	Gillingham	League One	1	0	1	0	0	0	0	0	2	0
2013-14	Maidstone United (on loan)	Isthmian Premier	5	0	0	0	0	0	1	0	6	0
Total			6	0	1	0	0	0	1	0	8	0
Career total			6	0	1	0	0	0	1	0	8	0
