= Thomas Shipley =

English footballer

Personal information
- Place of birth: Durham, England
- Position: Full-back

Senior career*
Years	Team	Apps	(Gls)
1930–1931	Portsmouth	0	(0)
1931–1933	Gillingham	16	(1)
- * Club domestic league appearances and goals

Thomas Shipley (born Durham) was an English professional footballer who played for Portsmouth and Gillingham between 1930 and 1933. He played in both full-back positions.
