= Eric Phoenix =

English footballer

William Eric Phoenix (20 January 1932 – 8 December 2000) was an English professional footballer of the 1950s. He played in the Football League for Gillingham and Exeter City, making 22 appearances.
