= Cyril Simpson (footballer) =

English footballer

Personal information
- Date of birth: 18 August 1942
- Place of birth: Aylesham, England
- Date of death: January 2015 (aged 72)
- Position: Forward

Senior career*
Years	Team	Apps	(Gls)
1960–1962	Gillingham	18	(0)
- * Club domestic league appearances and goals

Cyril Simpson (18 August 1942 – January 2015) was an English professional footballer of the 1960s. He played as a forward in the Football League for Gillingham, making 18 appearances. Simpson was born in August 1942 in Aylesham, Kent, and died in Kent in January 2015 at the age of 72.
