= Raymond Ramsay =

English footballer

Raymond Ramsay was an English professional association football player of the 1920s. He joined Gillingham from Walsall in 1922 and went on to make three appearances for the club in The Football League.
