= Cyril O'Sullivan =

English footballer

Cyril J. O'Sullivan (22 February 1920 – March 2003) was an English professional association footballer of the 1940s. Born in Lewisham, he joined Reading in September 1946 and made 36 appearances in The Football League. He later joined Gillingham of the Southern League, as understudy to regular goalkeeper Johnny Burke. He made only one appearance for the Gills' first team.
