= David Fry (footballer) =

English footballer (born 1960)

Personal information
- Full name: David Paul Fry
- Date of birth: 5 January 1960 (age 66)
- Place of birth: Bournemouth, England
- Position: Goalkeeper

Senior career*
Years	Team	Apps	(Gls)
1974-1976	Weymouth	12	(0)
1977–1983	Crystal Palace	40	(0)
1983–1985	Gillingham	49	(0)
1985–1986	Torquay United	30	(0)
- Fisher Athletic
1992	Salisbury City		
- * Club domestic league appearances and goals

David Paul Fry (born 5 January 1960) is an English former professional football goalkeeper. Born in Bournemouth, he began his career at Weymouth as an amateur and in January 1977 signed for Crystal Palace. Fry was initially understudy to firstly, John Burridge and then Paul Barron but in the second half of the 1982–83 season, became first-choice goalkeeper after Barron left the club. In July 1983, however, he was transferred to Gillingham and later went on to play for Torquay United.

After that, he moved into non-league football, playing for Cheltenham Town, Fisher Athletic and Yeovil Town in the Football Conference. In April 1991, he scored with a wind assisted drop kick for Yeovil in a 7–2 win in a league game against Slough Town.. He joined Salisbury City in the summer of 1992.
