= Thomas Brindley =

English cricketer and British Army officer

Personal information
- Full name: Thomas Brindley
- Born: 3 June 1841; Chester, Cheshire, England
- Died: 1 March 1911 (aged 69); West Cliff, Hampshire, England
- Batting: Right-handed
- Bowling: Unknown-arm underarm slow

Domestic team information
- Years: Team
- 1867: Marylebone Cricket Club

Career statistics
Competition	First-class
Matches	2
Runs scored	31
Batting average	10.33
100s/50s	–/–
Top score	13*
Catches/stumpings	–/–
- Source: Cricinfo, 25 October 2021

Thomas Brindley (3 June 1841 – 1 March 1911) was an English first-class cricketer and British Army officer.

Brindley was born at Chester in June 1841 and was privately educated during his childhood. He was commissioned into the 13th Staffordshire Rifle Volunteer Corps as an ensign in February 1860, with promotion to lieutenant following in June 1867. Brindley learnt to play cricket as an adult from James Lillywhite when he was resident in Cheltenham. He played two first-class cricket matches for the Marylebone Cricket Club in June 1867, against Lancashire and Surrey. Described by Scores and Biographies as "a free and good hitter", he scored 31 runs in these two matches, with a highest score of 13 not out. Besides playing first-class cricket, Brindley also played minor matches for Warwickshire and Staffordshire, in addition to playing club cricket for Cheltenham Town, for whom he scored a double-century in 1862.

By May 1869, he had tranfrerred to the 7th Royal Lancashire Militia and was promoted to captain in November 1870. He was later promoted to major in June 1882, before being made an honorary lieutenant colonel in the 3rd Royal Lancashire Militia in June 1889, with him gaining the rank in full in April 1891 and the honorary rank of colonel the following month. He became commandant of the 3rd and 4th Royal Lancashire Militia's in July 1892. Brindley resigned his commission in November 1895, retaining the rank of colonel. He died at the Bournemouth suburb of West Cliff in March 1911.
