= Tom Crombie =

Scottish footballer (1930–2018)

Personal information
- Full name: Thomas Ronald Crombie
- Date of birth: 3 June 1930
- Date of death: 28 February 2018 (aged 87)

Senior career*
Years	Team	Apps	(Gls)
1951–1955	Blackpool	0	(0)
1955–1957	Gillingham	17	(0)
- * Club domestic league appearances and goals

Thomas Ronald Crombie (3 June 1930 – February 2018) was a Scottish professional footballer of the 1950s. He played in the Football League for Gillingham, making 17 appearances.
