= Maud Mary Brindley =

English artist and suffragette (1866–1939)

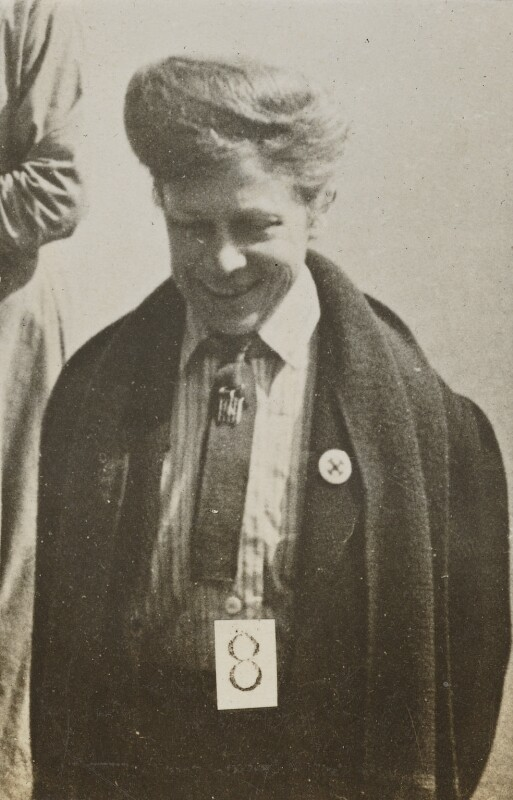
- Brindley in 1914
- Born: Mary Maud Eadon; Carlisle, England
- Died: 28 November 1939 (aged 73); West Malling, Kent, England
- Occupation: Artist
- Spouse: John Angell James Brindley

Maud Mary Brindley (1866 – 28 November 1939) was an English artist and suffragette and a member of the Women's Social and Political Union.

== Early life ==
Brindley was born in Carlisle in 1866 the daughter of Major Eadon.

== Activist ==
She was arrested for "incitement to rush the House of Commons" following a rally at Trafalgar Square in October 1908 which led to a three-month term in Holloway. She was remanded to allow her to get legal representation.

In 1913 Brindley was arrested and sentenced for breaking shop windows in Oxford Street; she served a five-month sentence at Holloway.

== Family life ==
Brindley married fellow artist and landscape painter John Angell James Brindley in 1899. She died on 28 November 1939 at West Malling, in Kent.
