= Roger Challis =

English footballer

Roger Leonard Alfred Challis (born 3 August 1943) is an English former professional footballer of the 1960s. He played professionally for Gillingham and Crewe Alexandra and made a total of 13 appearances in the Football League.
