= Michael Kent (footballer) =

English footballer

Michael John Kent (born 12 January 1951) was an English professional footballer of the early 1970s. Born in Dinnington, South Yorkshire, Kent played professionally for Wolverhampton Wanderers, Gillingham and Sheffield Wednesday and made a total of 15 appearances in the Football League.

Kent died at the age of 70 in March 2021.
