= Tom McAdam (English footballer) =

English footballer

Personal information
- Date of birth: 6 March 1917
- Place of birth: Shadwell, England
- Date of death: 1955 (aged 37–38)
- Position: Winger

Youth career
- Arsenal

Senior career*
Years	Team	Apps	(Gls)
- Tufnell Park
1937–1938	Southend United	2	(1)
1938	Gillingham		
1939	Chelmsford City	15	(3)
- * Club domestic league appearances and goals

Tom McAdam (6 March 1917 — 1955) was an English professional footballer who played as a winger.

== Career ==
McAdam began his career in the youth ranks at Arsenal. In senior football, McAdam played for Tufnell Park, before joining Southend United in 1937, where he made two Football League appearances, scoring once. In 1938, McAdam signed for Gillingham. In March 1939, McAdam signed for Southern League side Chelmsford City.
