= Brian Sparrow =

English footballer (1962–2019)

Personal information
- Full name: Brian Edward Sparrow
- Date of birth: 24 June 1962
- Place of birth: Bethnal Green, England
- Date of death: 6 December 2019 (aged 57)
- Height: 5 ft 7 in (1.70 m)
- Position: Full back

Youth career
- 1977–1982: Arsenal

Senior career*
Years	Team	Apps	(Gls)
1982–1984	Arsenal	2	(0)
1982	→ Wimbledon (loan)	17	(1)
1983	→ Millwall (loan)	5	(2)
1984	→ Gillingham (loan)	5	(1)
1984–1987	Crystal Palace	63	(2)
19??–1990	Enfield		
1990–1992	Crawley Town		
Total		92	(6)

Managerial career
- 1991–1992: Crawley Town (player-manager)
- 1996: Crawley Town (caretaker)
- 2012: Shenzhen Main Sports
- * Club domestic league appearances and goals

Brian Edward Sparrow (24 June 1962 – 6 December 2019) was an English professional footballer who played as a full back.

== Career ==
Born in Bethnal Green, Sparrow began his career at Arsenal, from where he spent loan spells at Wimbledon, Millwall and Gillingham. After spending three seasons with Crystal Palace, Sparrow dropped down to non-league football with Enfield and then Crawley Town, where he was player-manager from 1991 to 1992,

After retiring as a player, Sparrow worked as reserve-team manager of Wimbledon, made a brief return to Crawley as caretaker manager, and coached at Brentford and Crystal Palace. On 26 February 2012, Sparrow was appointed as the manager of China League Two side Shenzhen Main Sports, the same day the club was founded. He left China after club boss Sammy Yu resigned in July 2012.

He died on 6 December 2019, at the age of 57.

== Honours ==
Wimbledon

- Football League Fourth Division: 1982–83
