= Russell Musker =

English footballer and manager

Russell Musker (born 10 July 1962) is an English former footballer who played for Bristol City, Exeter City, Gillingham, Torquay United and Walsall between 1980 and 1992, making over 180 appearances in the Football League, before embarking on a career in the non-league game with Gloucester City, Saltash United and Taunton Town.

He later spent nearly ten years as manager of Taunton Town, leading them to victory in the final of the FA Vase in 2001.
