= Harold Sly =

English footballer

Personal information
- Date of birth: 26 February 1904
- Place of birth: Appley Bridge, England
- Date of death: 1996 (aged 91–92)
- Place of death: Hove, England
- Positions: Full back; half back; inside forward

Senior career*
Years	Team	Apps	(Gls)
19??–1922	Rover Motor Company		
1922–192?	Birmingham	0	(0)
192?–1927	Tamworth Castle		
1927–1929	Gillingham	15	(1)
1929–1933	Brighton & Hove Albion	22	(0)
1933–19??	FC Sète		
- * Club domestic league appearances and goals

Harold Sly (26 February 1904 – 1996) was an English professional footballer of the 1920s and 1930s.

Born in Appley Bridge, he played football for the Rover Company's team before joining Birmingham, however he never started a match for the club in the English Football League, and dropped back into the amateur game with Tamworth Castle. In 1927 he joined Gillingham of the Football League Third Division South, where he spent two seasons but never secured a regular place in the club's first team. He then moved to Brighton & Hove Albion, before joining French club FC Sète.
