= George Pybus =

English footballer

George Pybus (22 July 1911 – February 2001) was an English professional footballer of the 1930s.

Born in Brandon, County Durham, Pybus joined Gillingham from Chelsea in 1935. Playing as an inside right, he went on to make six appearances for the club in The Football League, scoring one goal. He left to join Folkestone Town in 1936.
