= Allen Scotting =

English footballer

Personal information
- Date of birth: 22 April 1966 (age 60)
- Place of birth: Dartford, England
- Positions: Left back; midfielder

Youth career
- Arsenal
- Charlton Athletic
- 1983–1984: Gillingham

Senior career*
Years	Team	Apps	(Gls)
1984	Gillingham	2	(0)
1984–1988	Bromley		
1988–1989	Maidstone United		
1989–1990	Bromley		
1989	→ Fisher Athletic (loan)		
1990	Margate		
1990–1991	Bromley		
1991–1992	Erith & Belvedere		
1992–1996	Phoenix Sports		
1996–1997	Erith & Belvedere		
- * Club domestic league appearances and goals

Allen Scotting (born 22 April 1966) is an English former professional footballer who played as a left back and midfielder.

== Career ==
Born in Dartford, Scotting played youth football with Arsenal and Charlton Athletic. He signed for Gillingham in April 1983 and turned professional in February 1984. He made his senior debut later that month, in the Associate Members' Cup. He made his league debut in April 1984. He made a total of two Football League appearances for Gillingham in 1984, and three appearances for the club in all competitions. He later played non-league football for Bromley (three spells), Maidstone United, Fisher Athletic, Margate, Erith & Belvedere (two spells) and Phoenix Sports.
