= Arthur Sinning =

English footballer

Arthur Edward Sinning (1902–1985) was an English professional footballer of the 1920s. Born in Tottenham, he joined Gillingham from Tottenham Hotspur in 1923 and went on to make 12 appearances for the club in The Football League, scoring two goals.
