= Bill Brindley =

English footballer

John Charles Brindley (29 January 1947 – 6 April 2007) was an English footballer active in the 1960s and 1970s. A full-back, he made a total of 247 appearances in the Football League for Nottingham Forest, Notts County and Gillingham. He played non-league football for Grantham, Burton Albion and Alfreton Town. He later managed Boston, Meadows Albion, Heanor Town, Ilkeston Town and Arnold Town.
