= Brian Gregory (footballer) =

Northern Irish footballer

Brian Gregory (born 11 January 1955) was a Northern Irish footballer who played as a forward. He made one Football League appearance for Gillingham and was also briefly on the books of Luton Town but spent most of his career playing non-league football.
