= Peter Sanders (sportsman) =

Welsh footballer and rugby union player

Personal information
- Full name: Peter Charles William Sanders
- Date of birth: 7 September 1942 (age 84)
- Place of birth: Newport, Wales
- Position: Centre forward

Youth career
- 1958–1959: Newport County

Senior career*
Years	Team	Apps	(Gls)
1959–1961	Newport County	3	(0)
1961–1962	Gillingham	2	(0)
1962–?	Prescot Cables		
- * Club domestic league appearances and goals

Peter Charles William Sanders (born 7 September 1942) is a Welsh former association football and rugby union player. He played professional association football for Newport County and Gillingham before switching to rugby union and playing for Newport and Cross Keys.

== Sporting career ==
=== Association football ===
Sanders was born in Newport and began his career playing association football as a centre forward for local team Newport County, one of the four Welsh clubs then playing in England's Football League. After a year as an amateur, he turned professional with the club in October 1959, soon after his 17th birthday. He went on to make three appearances for the "Ironsides" in the Football League Third Division, and was also selected for the Wales national youth team.

In July 1961 he left Newport to join Gillingham of the Fourth Division. He spent one season with the Kent-based club but was only selected to play for the first team twice. In July 1962 he dropped out of professional football and joined Prescot Cables of the Lancashire Combination.

=== Rugby union ===
Sanders later returned to his native Wales and played rugby union for his hometown club, Newport, as well as for Cross Keys.

=== Baseball ===
After retiring from playing sport, Sanders became involved with promoting sport in the Pillgwenlly area of Newport. For 40 years he has run the local baseball club, St Michael's, serving variously as chairman, secretary and coach, and in 2007 won a "Services to Sport" award from the South Wales Argus for his work with the club.

== Personal life ==
Sanders' son, Alan Sanders, also became a professional footballer, playing for Cardiff City in the early 1980s.
