= Martin Neyland =

English footballer

Personal information
- Full name: Martin Neyland
- Date of birth: 29 September 1877
- Place of birth: Bolton, England
- Date of death: 1947 (aged 69–70)
- Position: Forward

Senior career*
Years	Team	Apps	(Gls)
- Chatham Town
1900–1901	New Brompton	8	(4)
1901	Bolton Wanderers	2	(0)
1902–1903	Swindon Town	15	(2)
- Nelson
- * Club domestic league appearances and goals

Martin Neyland (29 September 1877 – 1947), sometimes known as Martin Nalan, was an English professional footballer who played as a forward in the Football League for Bolton Wanderers.

== Personal life ==
Neyland served in the Territorial Force with the Lancashire Fusiliers prior to the First World War. Shortly after the outbreak of the war in August 1914, he enlisted in the Loyal North Lancashire Regiment. Neyland transferred to the Royal Engineers in February 1917 and held the rank of pioneer.

== Career statistics ==
Appearances and goals by club, season and competition
Club	Season	League			FA Cup		Total	
Club	Season	Division	Apps	Goals	Apps	Goals	Apps	Goals
New Brompton	1900–01	Southern League First Division	8	4	0	0	8	4
Bolton Wanderers	1901–02	First Division	2	0	0	0	2	0
Swindon Town	1902–03	Southern League First Division	15	2	4	3	19	5
Career total			25	6	4	3	29	9
