= 1991–92 Gillingham F.C. season =

English football club season

Gillingham
1991–92 season
- Chairman: Bernard Baker
- Manager: Damien Richardson
- Fourth Division: 11th
- FA Cup: First round
- League Cup: First round
- Associate Members' Cup: First round
- Top goalscorer: League: David Crown (22); All: David Crown (24)
- Highest home attendance: 7,328 vs Brentford (29 November 1991)
- Lowest home attendance: 2,300 vs Maidstone United (10 December 1991)
Home colours	Away colours

During the 1991–92 English football season, Gillingham F.C. competed in the Football League Fourth Division, the fourth tier of the English football league system. It was the 60th season in which Gillingham competed in the Football League, and the 42nd since the club was voted back into the league in 1950. The team began the season with a 4–0 victory over Scunthorpe United but their form was inconsistent; not until February did they manage to win two consecutive league games. After a season spent largely in the middle of the league table, Gillingham finished 11th out of 22 teams in the Fourth Division.

Gillingham also competed in three knock-out competitions. The team were eliminated in the first round of both the FA Cup and Football League Cup. Gillingham progressed from the initial group stage of the Associate Members' Cup but lost in the first round proper. The team played a total of 51 competitive matches, winning 17, drawing 14 and losing 20, although a win and a draw were expunged when Aldershot were expelled from the Football League in March. David Crown was the team's top goalscorer, with 22 in the Fourth Division and 24 in all competitions, not including an expunged goal. Paul Clark and Steve Lovell made the most appearances, playing in every game. The highest attendance recorded at the club's home ground, Priestfield Stadium, was 7,328, for a game against Brentford in the FA Cup.

== Background and pre-season ==
The 1991–92 season was Gillingham's 60th season playing in the Football League and the 42nd since the club was elected back into the League in 1950 after being voted out in 1938. It was the club's third consecutive season in the Football League Fourth Division, the fourth tier of the English football league system. In the previous two seasons since being relegated from the Third Division, Gillingham had finished 14th and 15th out of 24 teams. In the 1991–92 season, the Fourth Division unusually had an odd number of teams due to league expansion and re-organisation, beginning the season with 23 members.

At the start of the season, Damien Richardson was the club's manager, a post he had held since April 1989. His assistant manager was fellow former Gillingham player Ron Hillyard, and Alan Walker was the team captain. Richardson signed two veteran players, both aged 32, prior to the start of the season. Karl Elsey, a midfielder who had played for Gillingham between 1985 and 1988, returned to the club on a free transfer from fellow Fourth Division team Maidstone United. Paul Clark, a defender who had played nearly 400 Football League matches, also arrived without a transfer fee, having been released by Southend United of the Second Division.

The club adopted a new kit design in its traditional colours of blue and white; the shirts were plain blue, replacing the previous season's unusual design featuring diagonal white stripes, and were worn with white shorts and socks. The away kit, to be worn in the event of a clash of colours with the home team, featured black and white stripes, the first-choice colours worn when the club was formed in 1893. The team prepared for the new season with a number of friendly matches, including a 4–1 victory over a West Ham United team which included a mix of the First Division team's regular starters and reserves. Three days later, Steve Russell, goalkeeper for Gillingham's youth team, found himself in the unusual position of playing two complete games in one day; having played for the youth team in the morning, he was selected for the first team against Dover Athletic in the afternoon after Harvey Lim failed a last-minute fitness test.

== Fourth Division ==
=== August–December ===
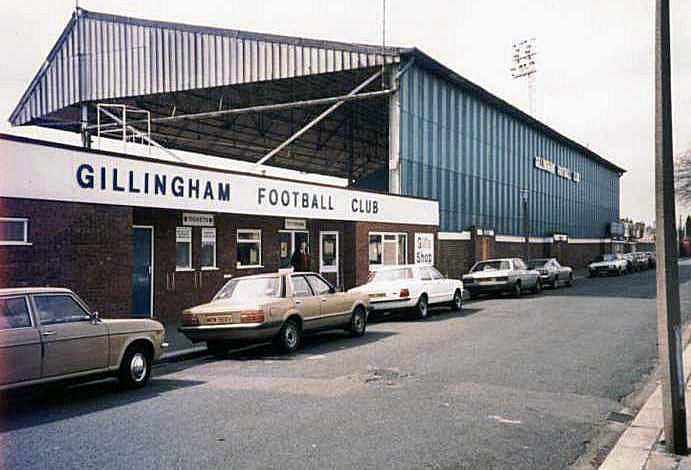
Gillingham's first game of the season was a home win at Priestfield Stadium against Scunthorpe United.

Gillingham's first match of the season was at their home ground, Priestfield Stadium, against Scunthorpe United; Elsey and Clark both made their debut and Elsey scored the opening goal in a 4–0 victory. After a draw away to York City and a weekend with no scheduled game due to the uneven number of teams in the division, Gillingham lost for the first time in the league with a 2–0 defeat away to Hereford United on 4 September, finishing the game with ten men after Lee Palmer was sent off. Gillingham defeated Scarborough 2–0 on 7 September with two goals in the last six minutes of the game, after which they were 10th in the league table, but then gained only one point from the next five games to slip to 19th. The run included defeats to Wrexham, Blackpool, Crewe Alexandra and Chesterfield, although they were able to hold second-placed Barnet to a 3–3 draw. The performances of Lim in particular were questioned, so Richardson signed goalkeeper Keith Branagan on loan from Millwall, but Branagan was injured in a reserve team game and only played one match for the first team before returning to his parent club.

Gillingham ended their winless league run on 12 October, beating Halifax Town 3–0; David Crown scored twice. Two weeks later Crown scored the team's first hat-trick of the season as they beat Northampton Town 3–1 at Priestfield; midfielder Neil Smith, recently signed on loan from Tottenham Hotspur, made his debut. After impressing with his performances during the loan spell, he joined the club on a permanent basis for a transfer fee of £40,000 (equivalent to £110,000 in 2023), which was reported to have been financed by the payment which the club received from Sky Sports after one of Gillingham's games was broadcast live.

Gillingham extended their unbeaten league run to six games with draws against Carlisle United, Cardiff City and Maidstone United, after which they were 13th in the table. The game against Maidstone, Gillingham's local rivals, drew an attendance of 6,716, Gillingham's largest home crowd of the season for a Fourth Division match. The team's unbeaten run came to an end with a 4–3 defeat away to Mansfield Town on 23 November. Gillingham defeated Aldershot 3–1 on 30 November, ending a run of seven games without a win in all competitions, and then drew twice more, against Rotherham United and York City. Crown scored in all three matches to take his total of league goals for the season so far to 13, nearly half the total scored by the entire team. The team's final match of 1991 was on 26 December against the same opponents they had faced in the first game of the season, Scunthorpe United; Gillingham lost 2–0, which left them 15th in the league table.

=== January–May ===
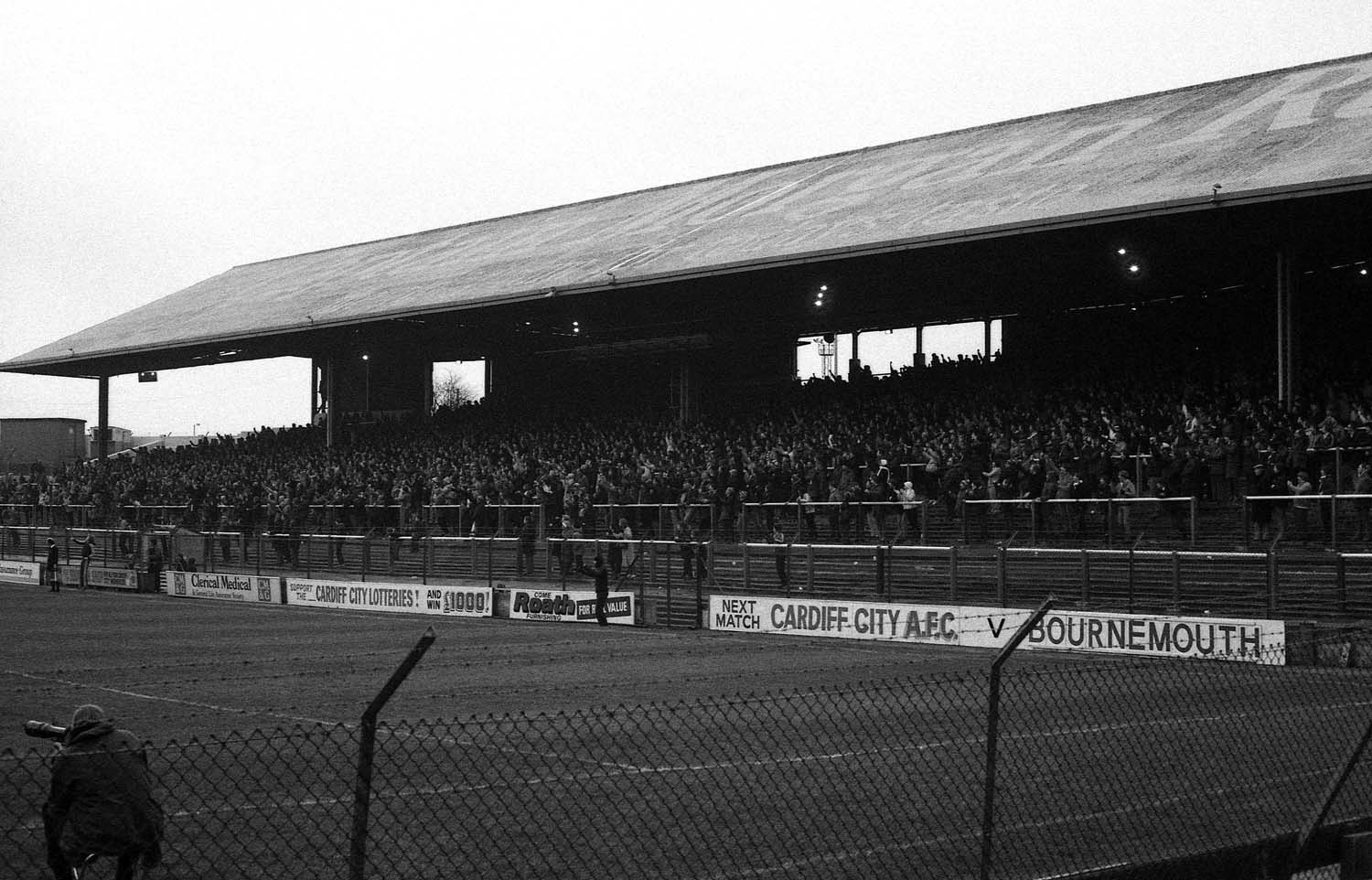
Gillingham's victory at Cardiff's Ninian Park in March would prove to be the team's last league win away from home for more than 18 months.

Gillingham began the new year with a 2–1 victory at home to Hereford United on 1 January. The team beat Walsall 4–0 on 11 January, Crown scoring his second hat-trick of the season, but then conceded four in a defeat to promotion-chasing Burnley. A win over Doncaster Rovers on 1 February left Gillingham 13th in the table. On 15 February, the team followed two consecutive goalless draws by beating Rotherham United, who were fifth in the table, 5–1 at Priestfield; Steve Lovell scored the team's third hat-trick of the season. It was the first time that Gillingham had scored five goals in a game since September 1989. A week later, Gillingham won 1–0 away to Walsall, the first time during the season that the team had won two consecutive league matches, however their unbeaten league run ended with a 3–1 defeat at home to Lincoln City on 29 February.

On 3 March, Gillingham achieved a 3–0 victory over Burnley, who had not lost for seven games and would go on to win the Fourth Division championship; Crown scored the first goal, the first of four consecutive league games in which he scored. A week later, defender Richard Green, recently signed on loan from Swindon Town, scored twice on his Gillingham debut as the team defeated Cardiff City 3–2 at Ninian Park. It would prove to be Gillingham's final league win away from home until October 1993, a run of 30 consecutive away league games without a victory. The team failed to win in the next three games but ended the month with consecutive home victories over Mansfield Town and Wrexham, which took them up to 10th in the league table. Another loan signing, Watford's Rod Thomas, made his debut against Mansfield. Three days before that game, Aldershot were expelled from the Football League after the club went into liquidation; all their results up to that point in the season were expunged from the league table, meaning that Gillingham lost the four points they had acquired from a win and a draw against Aldershot.

On 11 April, Gillingham defeated Blackpool 3–2 at Priestfield despite finishing the game with nine players. Both Crown and Lim were sent off, leading to defender Joe Dunne taking over in goal; Dunne was selected because he had played Gaelic football as a youth in his native Ireland, which Richardson felt would help with his ability to catch and handle the ball. It was the team's only win in five matches played in April, during which they lost away to Scarborough and Barnet and at home to Crewe Alexandra. Gillingham's final match of the season was at home to Halifax Town. Lovell, who had scored only four league goals before Christmas, scored twice in a 2–0 victory, giving him seven in the last nine games of the season and a total of sixteen for the season. His second goal against Halifax was his 100th for the club. Gillingham finished 11th out of 22 remaining teams in the Fourth Division, 12 points below the promotion play-off places; a review of the season published in the Rothmans Football Yearbook stated that "Gillingham's consistency was simply one of being an average team in the middle of the table".

=== Match details ===
Key

- In result column, Gillingham's score shown first
- H = Home match
- A = Away match
- pen. = Penalty kick
- o.g. = Own goal

Results

Date	Opponents	Result	Goalscorers	Attendance
17 August 1991	Scunthorpe United (H)	4–0	Elsey, Crown, O'Connor, Beadle	3,480
24 August 1991	York City (A)	1–1	Crown	2,324
4 September 1991	Hereford United (A)	0–2		2,544
7 September 1991	Scarborough (H)	2–0	Arnott, Lovell	3,375
14 September 1991	Wrexham (A)	1–2	Elsey	1,602
17 September 1991	Blackpool (A)	0–2		3,035
21 September 1991	Barnet (H)	3–3	Eeles, Crown (2)	4,864
28 September 1991	Crewe Alexandra (A)	1–2	Trusson (pen.)	3,126
5 October 1991	Chesterfield (H)	0–1		2,835
12 October 1991	Halifax Town (A)	3–0	Crown (2), Beadle	1,435
19 October 1991	Doncaster Rovers (A)	1–1	Lovell	1,468
26 October 1991	Northampton Town (H)	3–1	Crown (3)	2,544
2 November 1991	Carlisle United (A)	0–0		1,672
5 November 1991	Cardiff City (H)	0–0		2,641
9 November 1991	Maidstone United (H)	1–1	O'Connor	6,716
23 November 1991	Mansfield Town (A)	3–4	Lovell, Crown, Arnott	3,287
30 November 1991	Aldershot (H)	3–1^{[a]}	Crown, Arnott, Smith	2,566
14 December 1991	Rotherham United (A)	1–1	Crown	3,137
21 December 1991	York City (H)	1–1	Crown	2,711
26 December 1991	Scunthorpe United (A)	0–2		3,883
1 January 1992	Hereford United (H)	2–1	Lovell, Smith	3,392
4 January 1992	Lincoln City (A)	0–1		2,169
11 January 1992	Walsall (H)	4–0	Crown (3), Elsey	2,715
18 January 1992	Burnley (A)	1–4	Walker	8,908
1 February 1992	Doncaster Rovers (H)	2–1	Smith, O'Connor	2,366
8 February 1992	Northampton Town (A)	0–0		3,007
11 February 1992	Aldershot (A)	0–0^{[a]}		2,986
15 February 1992	Rotherham United (H)	5–1	Lovell (3), Dempsey, Crown	2,486
22 February 1992	Walsall (A)	1–0	Dempsey	2,987
29 February 1992	Lincoln City (H)	1–3	Lovell	3,160
3 March 1992	Burnley (H)	3–0	Crown, Beadle, Lovell	3,729
7 March 1992	Rochdale (A)	1–2	Crown	1,941
10 March 1992	Cardiff City (A)	3–2	Green (2), Crown	8,521
14 March 1992	Carlisle United (H)	1–2	Crown	2,789
17 March 1992	Rochdale (H)	0–0		2,322
21 March 1992	Maidstone United (A)	1–1	Lovell	3,264
28 March 1992	Mansfield Town (H)	2–0	Lovell, Beadle	2,682
31 March 1992	Wrexham (H)	2–1	Lovell (pen.), Green	3,078
4 April 1992	Scarborough (A)	1–2	Crown	1,174
11 April 1992	Blackpool (H)	3–2	Lovell, Crown, Beadle	3,684
18 April 1992	Barnet (A)	0–2		4,049
20 April 1992	Crewe Alexandra (H)	0–1		2,928
25 April 1992	Chesterfield (A)	3–3	Thomas, Lovell, Green	2,109
2 May 1992	Halifax Town (H)	2–0	Lovell (2, 1 pen.)	2,413

a. Result expunged following Aldershot's expulsion from the Football League

=== Partial league table ===
Football League Fourth Division final table, positions 8–13
Pos	Team	Pld	W	D	L	GF	GA	GD	Pts
8	Rochdale	42	18	13	11	57	53	+4	67
9	Cardiff City	42	17	15	10	66	53	+13	66
10	Lincoln City	42	17	11	14	50	44	+6	62
11	Gillingham	42	15	12	15	63	53	+10	57
12	Scarborough	42	15	12	15	64	68	−4	57
13	Chesterfield	42	14	11	17	49	61	−12	53

== Cup matches ==
=== FA Cup ===
As a Fourth Division team, Gillingham entered the 1991–92 FA Cup in the first round and were paired with Brentford, who were top of the Third Division. The match at Brentford's Griffin Park stadium ended in a 3–3 draw after Gillingham had trailed 3–1 with less than 20 minutes remaining, necessitating a replay at Priestfield. The second match drew an attendance of 7,328, the largest recorded at Priestfield during the season. Captain Walker scored a goal, following on from two he had scored in the initial match, but Gillingham lost 3–1 and were eliminated from the competition.

==== Match details ====
Key

- In result column, Gillingham's score shown first
- H = Home match
- A = Away match
- pen. = Penalty kick
- o.g. = Own goal

Results

Date	Round	Opponents	Result	Goalscorers	Attendance
18 November 1991	First	Brentford (A)	3–3	Walker (2), Smith	5,838
26 November 1991	First (replay)	Brentford (H)	1–3	Walker	7,328

=== Football League Cup ===
Gillingham entered the 1991–92 Football League Cup in the first round and their opponents were Portsmouth of the Second Division. The tie was played over two legs, with the first at Portsmouth's Fratton Park ground and the second at Priestfield. Teenaged forward Peter Beadle came on as a substitute and scored for Gillingham in the first leg but his team lost 2–1. Seven days later, Portsmouth won the second leg 4–3 and thus won the tie by an aggregate score of 6–4, ending Gillingham's participation in the League Cup.

==== Match details ====
Key

- In result column, Gillingham's score shown first
- H = Home match
- A = Away match
- pen. = Penalty kick
- o.g. = Own goal

Results

Date	Round	Opponents	Result	Goalscorers	Attendance
20 August 1991	First (first leg)	Portsmouth (A)	1–2	Beadle	4,801
27 August 1991	First (second leg)	Portsmouth (H)	3–4	Crown, Walker, Beadle	5,114

=== Associate Members' Cup ===
The 1991–92 Associate Members' Cup, a tournament exclusively for Third and Fourth Division teams, began with a preliminary round in which the teams were drawn into groups of three, contested on a round-robin basis. Gillingham's group also contained their local rivals Maidstone United as well as Fulham of the Third Division. Gillingham's first match resulted in a 2–0 defeat away to Fulham; as the Third Division side had already beaten Maidstone they were now guaranteed to top the group and qualify for the first round proper, leaving the game between the two Kent-based teams to determine the second qualifier. Gillingham defeated Maidstone 4–2 in front of a crowd of 2,300, the lowest attendance at Priestfield during the season, to reach the first round. The random draw for the first round paired Gillingham with Fulham again. The game again took place at Fulham's Craven Cottage ground and the result was identical to the earlier meeting between the two sides, Fulham winning 2–0 to eliminate Gillingham from the competition.

==== Match details ====
Key

- In result column, Gillingham's score shown first
- H = Home match
- A = Away match
- pen. = Penalty kick
- o.g. = Own goal

Results

Date	Round	Opponents	Result	Goalscorers	Attendance
29 November 1991	Group	Fulham (A)	0–2		1,108
10 December 1991	Group	Maidstone United (H)	4–2	Smith (2), Crown, Haylock (o.g.)	2,300
14 January 1992	First	Fulham (A)	0–2		1,483

== Players ==
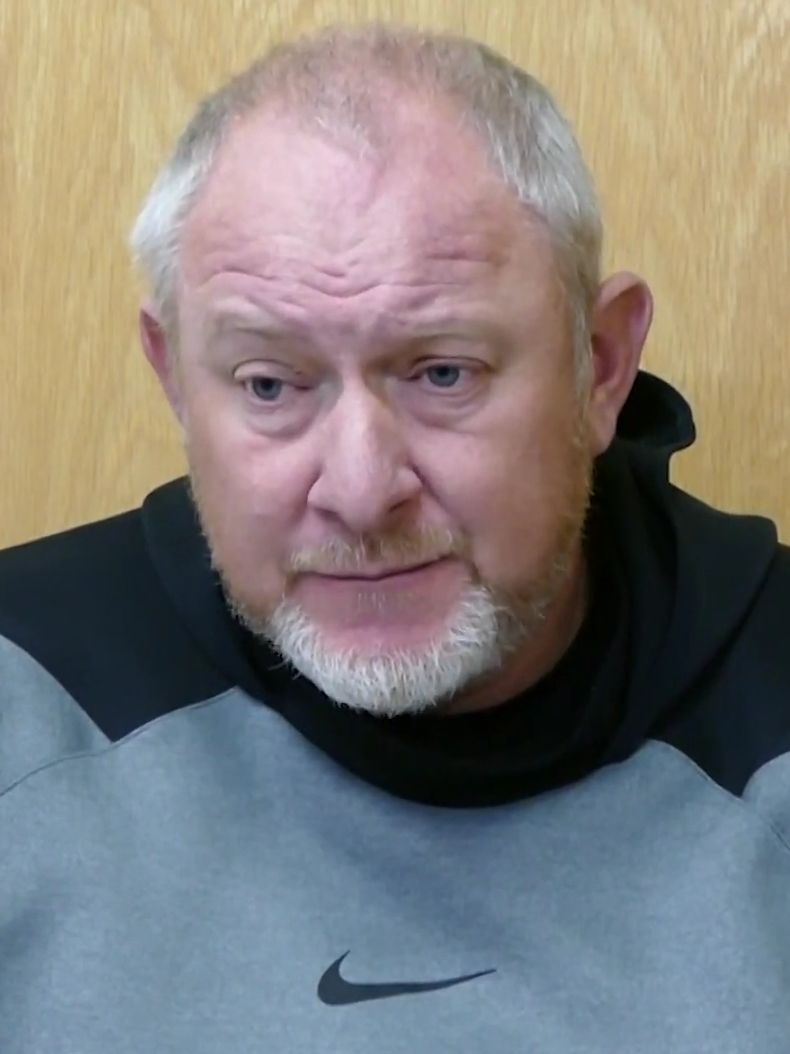
Peter Beadle (pictured in 2020) scored seven goals during the season.

Twenty-eight players made at least one appearance for Gillingham during the season. Clark and Lovell made the most; both players were ever-present during the season, playing in all 51 games, including the two which were expunged following Aldershot's expulsion from the Football League in March. Lim, O'Connor, Walker, and Crown all made more than 40 appearances. Two players, both goalkeepers, played only once during the season. Branagan made one league appearance in October and Tim Dalton played in one Associate Members' Cup game. Both left the club without making any further appearances.

Thirteen players scored at least one goal for Gillingham during the season. Crown was the top goalscorer, with 22 goals in Football League matches and a total of 24 in all competitions; these figures do not include a goal which he scored against Aldershot. Lovell, the team's top scorer for the previous four seasons, scored 16; no other player scored more than 7.

Player statistics
Player	Position	Fourth Division		FA Cup		League Cup		Associate Members' Cup		Total	
Player	Position	Apps	Goals	Apps	Goals	Apps	Goals	Apps	Goals	Apps	Goals
Andy Arnott	MF	19^{+2}	2^{+1}	2	0	0	0	2	0	23^{+2}	2^{+1}
Peter Beadle	FW	33^{+2}	5	2	0	2	2	0	0	37^{+2}	7
Austin Berkley	MF	3	0	0	0	0	0	3	0	6	0
Keith Branagan	GK	1	0	0	0	0	0	0	0	1	0
Tony Butler	DF	5	0	0	0	2	0	1	0	8	0
Richard Carpenter	MF	3	0	0	0	0	0	1	0	4	0
Paul Clark	DF	42^{+2}	0	2	0	2	0	3	0	49^{+2}	0
Brian Clarke	DF	11	0	0	0	0	0	2	0	13	0
David Crown	FW	36^{+1}	22^{+1}	2	0	2	1	2	1	42^{+1}	24^{+1}
Tim Dalton	GK	0	0	0	0	0	0	1	0	1	0
Mark Dempsey	DF	30^{+2}	2	2	0	0	0	3	0	35^{+2}	2
Joe Dunne	DF	11	0	0	0	0	0	0	0	11	0
Tony Eeles	MF	14^{+1}	1	2	0	2	0	2	0	20^{+1}	1
Karl Elsey	MF	27^{+1}	3	2	0	2	0	1	0	32^{+1}	3
Richard Green	DF	12	4	0	0	0	0	0	0	12	4
Lee Harrison	GK	2	0	0	0	0	0	0	0	2	0
Harvey Lim	GK	39^{+2}	0	2	0	2	0	2	0	45^{+2}	0
Steve Lovell	FW	42^{+2}	16	2	0	2	0	3	0	49^{+2}	16
Eliot Martin	DF	22^{+1}	0	0	0	1	0	2	0	25^{+1}	0
Mark O'Connor	MF	39^{+2}	3	2	0	2	0	2	0	45^{+2}	3
Tim O'Shea	DF	30^{+2}	0	2	0	2	0	2	0	36^{+2}	0
Lawrence Osborne	MF	5	0	0	0	0	0	0	0	5	0
Lee Palmer	DF	11^{+1}	0	0	0	1	0	0	0	12^{+1}	0
Andy Polston	DF	2^{+1}	0	0	0	0	0	2	0	4^{+1}	0
Neil Smith	MF	26^{+2}	2^{+1}	2	1	0	0	3	2	31^{+2}	5^{+1}
Rod Thomas	MF	8	1	0	0	0	0	0	0	8	1
Mike Trusson	MF	10	1	0	0	2	0	0	0	12	1
Alan Walker	DF	40^{+2}	1	2	3	2	1	1	0	45^{+2}	5

FW = Forward, MF = Midfielder, GK = Goalkeeper, DF = Defender
Superscript figures represent appearances and goals in the two games against Aldershot which were expunged when the team was expelled from the Football League.

== Aftermath ==
Walker was voted into the Professional Footballers' Association Team of the Year for the Fourth Division by his fellow professionals, the first Gillingham player to be honoured in five years. He did not receive the club's player of the year award, however, which went to Clark. Several players left the club at the conclusion of the season, including Beadle, who joined Tottenham Hotspur of the Premier League for a transfer fee of £300,000 (equivalent to £780,000 in 2023), a new record for the highest fee received by Gillingham for a player. The teams in the Football League First Division, the highest level of the sport in England, broke away at the conclusion of the season to form the new FA Premier League; as a result, the Football League was reduced from four divisions to three, placing Gillingham in the new Third Division. After a mid-table finish in the 1991–92 season, Gillingham struggled the following season and, by October, the team were close to the bottom of the Third Division; Richardson was dismissed from his job as the club's manager. Glenn Roeder was appointed as his replacement in a player-manager capacity. The team's performances remained poor and, with two games remaining, Gillingham still faced the possibility of finishing bottom of the division and being relegated out of the Football League. Victory over Halifax Town in the penultimate match of the season, however, ensured that Gillingham would stay in the Third Division, and the team remained there until they gained promotion to the Second Division in 1996.
