= 1992–93 Gillingham F.C. season =

English football club season

Gillingham
1992–93 season
- Chairman: Bernard Baker
- Manager: Damien Richardson (until 8 October 1992); Paul Clark (caretaker, 8 – 26 October 1992); Glenn Roeder (from 26 October 1992)
- Third Division: 21st
- FA Cup: Third round
- League Cup: Second round
- League Trophy: First round
- Top goalscorer: League: Andy Arnott; Paul Baker; Nicky Forster (6 each); All: David Crown (9)
- Highest home attendance: 7,488 vs Southampton (23 September 1992)
- Lowest home attendance: 1,085 vs Fulham (8 December 1992)
Home colours	Away colours

During the 1992–93 English football season, Gillingham F.C. competed in the Football League Third Division, the fourth tier of the English football league system. It was the 61st season in which Gillingham competed in the Football League, and the 43rd since the club was voted back into the league in 1950. By October, the team were close to the bottom of the Third Division and Damien Richardson was dismissed from his job as the club's manager. Glenn Roeder was appointed as his replacement in a player-manager capacity. The team's performances remained poor and, with two games remaining, Gillingham still faced the possibility of finishing bottom of the league table and being relegated out of the Football League. Victory over Halifax Town in the penultimate match of the season, however, ensured that Gillingham would compete in the Third Division again in the following season. Roeder resigned as manager following the conclusion of the season after less than nine months in charge.

Gillingham also competed in three knock-out competitions. The team reached the third round of the FA Cup and the second round of the Football League Cup but failed to progress beyond the initial group stage of the Football League Trophy. The team played a total of 53 competitive matches, winning 13, drawing 17, and losing 23. David Crown was the team's top goalscorer, with five goals in the Football League and a total of nine in all competitions, the lowest figure with which a player had finished a season as Gillingham's top scorer since the 1930s. Tony Butler made the most appearances, playing in 50 of the team's 53 competitive matches. The highest attendance recorded at the club's home ground, Priestfield Stadium, was 7,488, for a game against Southampton of the FA Premier League in the second round of the Football League Cup.

== Background and pre-season ==
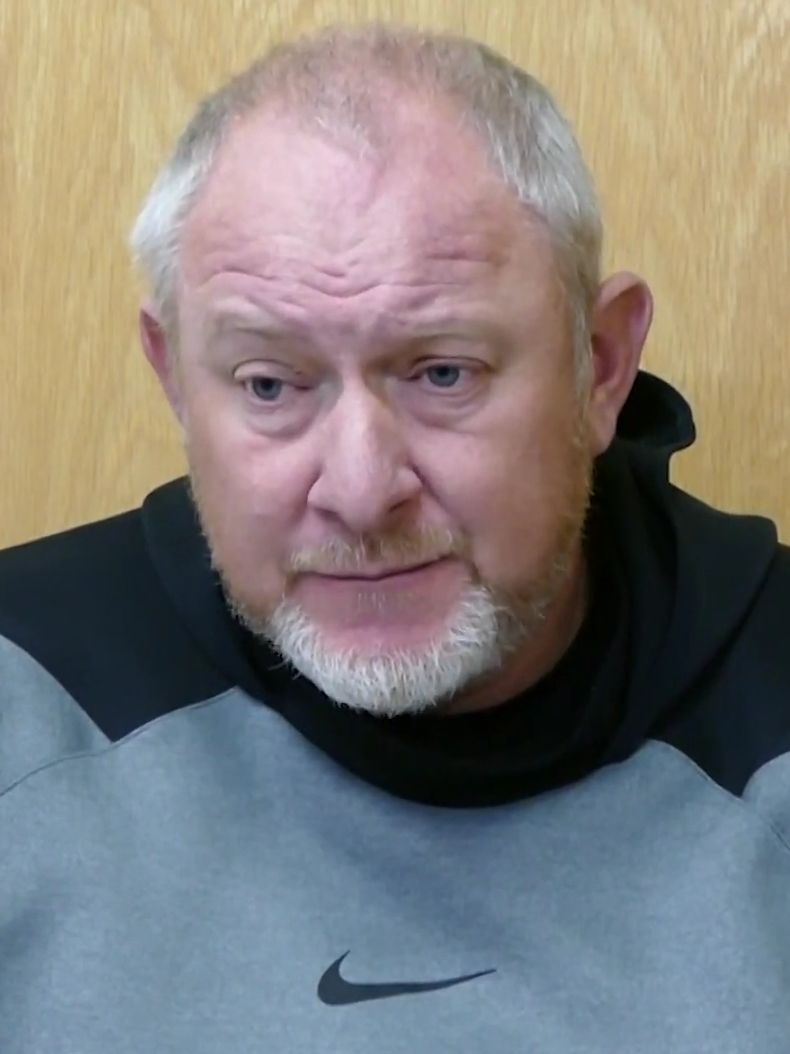
Peter Beadle (pictured in 2020) left the club before the start of the new season for a record transfer fee.

The 1992–93 season was Gillingham's 61st season playing in the Football League and the 43rd since the club was elected back into the League in 1950 after being voted out in 1938. It was the club's fourth consecutive season in the fourth tier of the English football league system. Following the 1991–92 season, the teams in the Football League First Division, the highest level of the sport in England, broke away to form the new FA Premier League. As a result, the Football League was reduced from four divisions to three, placing Gillingham in the new Third Division rather than the old Fourth Division. Gillingham had finished 11th in the 22-team division in the 1991–92 season.

At the start of the season, Damien Richardson was the club's manager, a post he had held since April 1989. His assistant manager was Ron Hillyard, a fellow former Gillingham player. Paul Clark served as the team's captain. The management team signed five new players prior to the first game of the season. Gary Breen, a teenaged defender, and Liburd Henry, a forward, joined from Gillingham's Kent rivals, Maidstone United, also of the Third Division. Maidstone were experiencing severe financial difficulties and almost all their players left after the 1991–92 season; after being unable to fulfil their first game of the new season, they resigned from the Football League. Veteran forward Trevor Aylott joined Gillingham from Birmingham City and Scott Barrett, a goalkeeper, arrived from Colchester United. Richard Green, who had spent part of the previous season on loan to Gillingham from Swindon Town, re-joined the club on a permanent contract. Several players left the club, including previous captain Alan Walker. Forward Peter Beadle joined Tottenham Hotspur of the Premier League for a transfer fee of £300,000 (equivalent to £780,000 in 2023), a new record for the highest fee received by Gillingham for a player.

The team prepared for the new season with a number of friendly matches, one of which was a testimonial match for Bill "Buster" Collins, who had been with the club in a variety of roles since the early 1960s, including a long spell as youth team manager. Manchester United player Steve Bruce, who had started his professional career at Gillingham and credited Collins as a major influence, brought a team from his club to play against Gillingham in a match which drew a crowd of over 8,000 spectators. The club adopted a new kit design, adding white shoulder panels to the usual blue shirts; the away kit, to be worn in the event of a clash of colours with the home team, featured black and white stripes, the first-choice colours worn when the club was formed in 1893. Previewing the division, Keith Blackmore of The Times wrote that Gillingham were not among the bookmakers' favourites for promotion but nonetheless had a good chance, noting in particular the new signings from Maidstone and the fact that "no team containing [David] Crown and [Steve] Lovell is likely to go short of goals".

== Third Division ==
=== August–December ===
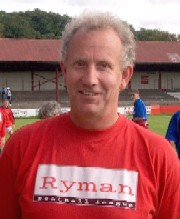
Ron Hillyard (pictured in 2001), who had been with the club since 1974 as a player and subsequently assistant manager, was dismissed in October along with manager Damien Richardson.

Gillingham's first match of the season was at their home ground, Priestfield Stadium, against Northampton Town; Lawrence Osborne gave Gillingham the lead in his only appearance of the season and indeed his final appearance for the club, but they ultimately lost 3–2. The team also lost the next game, away to Bury; goalkeeper Barrett was sent off, the first of three occasions during the season when he would be dismissed. Gillingham recorded their first league win of the season at the fourth attempt, beating Wrexham 4–1 on 1 September. Lovell scored the team's only hat-trick of the season in the win, which would prove to be Gillingham's only victory in the first thirteen Third Division games of the season. The team drew their next three games, leaving them 14th in the 22-team league table, but then lost six consecutive league matches.

Defeat at home to Crewe Alexandra on 3 October left Gillingham 21st in the table, one place off the bottom of the entire Football League. Five days later, both Richardson and Hillyard were dismissed from their jobs by the club's board of directors. It meant the end of an 18-year association with the club for Hillyard, who had joined Gillingham as a player in 1974 before becoming assistant manager in 1989. Richardson attributed the team's poor performance to a combination of players' inexperience and the tactics he had employed, saying "I've lost my job on a matter of principle – teaching kids to play attractive football [...] I had to sell all the best players to get money in as the board wanted the kids to be pushed". Paul Clark, the captain, served as caretaker manager until 26 October, when Glenn Roeder was appointed as the club's new player-manager. The former Queens Park Rangers and Newcastle United defender had left third-tier Leyton Orient earlier in the year and was playing non-League football for Purfleet at the time of his appointment. His first game in charge resulted in a defeat at home to Torquay United. That game was the final Gillingham appearance for veteran forward Lovell, who had been with the club since 1987; as he did not feature in Roeder's plans he was sent out on loan to AFC Bournemouth for a short spell before leaving Gillingham altogether in December.

Gillingham won a league game for the first time in more than two months on 3 November, defeating Hereford United, and two games later beat Darlington by the same score, but had by then fallen to the bottom of the table. The team's first two Third Division matches of December resulted in defeats to Shrewsbury Town and Colchester United; the latter game took place only two days after Gillingham had defeated the same opponents in the FA Cup. Gillingham had originally been scheduled to play Maidstone on Boxing Day, but due to the latter team's withdrawal from the League, Gillingham instead re-arranged a game against Bury which had previously been scheduled for late January. Gillingham lost 4–1 in a match in which their opponents wore Gillingham's second-choice kit in the second half after the referee decided that the two teams' colours were too similar. The team's final game of 1992 was away to Scunthorpe United and ended in a 2–2 draw; Roeder selected himself in the starting line-up for the first time and, having turned 37 two weeks earlier, became the oldest player to make his debut for Gillingham. The year ended with Gillingham bottom of the Third Division.

=== January–May ===
Gillingham's first league game of 1993 was at home to Rochdale and resulted in a 4–2 victory for the home team, lifting them off the bottom of the table. Forward Paul Baker, signed from Motherwell days earlier, scored on his debut; he would start every game for the remainder of the season. After that victory, however, Gillingham won only one of the next ten league games. Scottish forward Paul Ritchie, signed on loan from Dundee, made his debut on 6 February against Northampton and scored Gillingham's first goal in a 2–2 draw; seven days later he scored twice as the team defeated Scarborough, only their second victory of 1993. Fellow forward Crown, who had played intermittently in the first half of the season but not made any appearances since mid-December, came on as a substitute against Doncaster Rovers in the last game of February and scored an equalising goal in the final minute. Gillingham ended the month one point off the bottom of the league table.

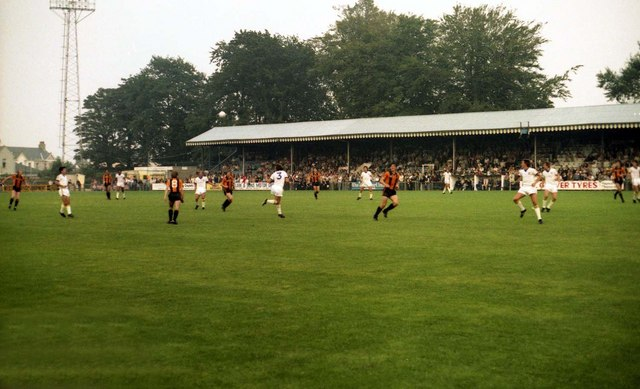
Gillingham lost the last game of the season at Plainmoor (pictured in 1981), home of Torquay United, to complete an entire league season without an away victory.

Gillingham began March with two defeats, including a 2–0 loss away to Barnet in which both goals were own goals scored by Gillingham players. Gillingham defeated Carlisle United on 13 March, their first win for seven games; the victory took them up to 19th in the table. Two games later, the team achieved another victory, beating Lincoln City; Nicky Forster scored twice in a 3–1 win. Having not started a match since before Christmas, Forster had returned to the team in the win over Carlisle and would remain Baker's forward partner for the rest of the season. The first game of April resulted in a 4–1 defeat at home to York City, only the second time the team had conceded four goals in a game during the season, but Gillingham then beat Shrewsbury Town, who were sixth in the table and challenging for a place in the play-offs for promotion.

A 3–0 defeat to Colchester on 16 April meant that with two games remaining, Gillingham were 20th in the Third Division and could still finish bottom, which would result in them being relegated out of the Football League. The remaining games were against Halifax Town and Torquay, the two teams below Gillingham in the table. On 1 May, Gillingham defeated Halifax 2–0 at Priestfield with goals from Tony Eeles and Baker; the result meant that Gillingham could no longer finish below their opponents and were therefore safe from relegation. The game drew a crowd of 7,151, the largest attendance of the season for a league match at Priestfield by a margin of more than 3,000. After the match, Roeder commented to the press that it had been the most important game in Gillingham's history, saying "All the emotion you can imagine. It was a Cup tie, wasn't it?" Gillingham lost to Torquay in the final match of the season and finished 21st, one place above Halifax, who lost their place in the Football League. The defeat meant that, for the first time in the club's history, Gillingham had gone through an entire season without winning a league game away from home. Reviewing the season for the magazine When Saturday Comes ten years later, Chris Lynham characterised the team as poor in all areas, picking out Aylott's unsatisfactory performance as a replacement for Beadle up front and the regularity with which the defence conceded goals in injury time. Contrary to Blackmore's prediction prior to the season, only four teams in the Third Division scored fewer goals than Gillingham.

=== Match details ===
Key

- In result column, Gillingham's score shown first
- H = Home match
- A = Away match
- pen. = Penalty kick
- o.g. = Own goal

Results

Date	Opponents	Result	Goalscorers	Attendance
15 August 1992	Northampton Town (H)	2–3	Osborne, O'Connor	3,863
22 August 1992	Bury (A)	0–1		1,806
29 August 1992	Barnet (H)	1–1	Crown	3,874
1 September 1992	Wrexham (H)	4–1	Lovell (3, 1 pen.), Aylott	2,503
5 September 1992	Scarborough (A)	1–1	Aylott	1,412
12 September 1992	Chesterfield (H)	0–0		2,853
15 September 1992	Rochdale (A)	1–1	Henry	1,879
19 September 1992	Cardiff City (A)	1–3	Forster	6,356
26 September 1992	Walsall (H)	0–1		2,821
3 October 1992	Crewe Alexandra (H)	1–2	Clark	2,420
10 October 1992	Doncaster Rovers (A)	0–1		2,477
24 October 1992	Halifax Town (A)	0–2		1,216
31 October 1992	Torquay United (H)	0–2		3,067
3 November 1992	Hereford United (H)	3–1	Forster (2), Arnott	2,143
7 November 1992	Carlisle United (A)	0–1		3,213
21 November 1992	Darlington (H)	3–1	Crown, Parkin (o.g.), Forster	2,563
28 November 1992	Lincoln City (A)	1–1	Arnott	3,175
12 December 1992	Shrewsbury Town (A)	1–2	Arnott	2,442
18 December 1992	Colchester United (H)	0–1		2,331
26 December 1992	Bury (H)	1–4	Smith	3,632
28 December 1992	Scunthorpe United (A)	2–2	Arnott, Stephenson	2,835
8 January 1993	Rochdale (H)	4–2	Arnott (2), Green, Baker	3,052
16 January 1993	Walsall (A)	1–1	Smith	3,253
23 January 1993	Cardiff City (H)	0–1		4,069
6 February 1993	Northampton Town (A)	2–2	Baker, Ritchie	3,812
13 February 1993	Scarborough (H)	3–1	Ritchie (2), Stephenson	3,022
16 February 1993	Chesterfield (A)	1–1	Green	2,721
20 February 1993	Wrexham (A)	0–2		4,415
27 February 1993	Doncaster Rovers (H)	1–1	Crown	2,975
2 March 1993	Barnet (A)	0–2		3,446
6 March 1993	Crewe Alexandra (A)	1–3	Martin	3,215
9 March 1993	York City (A)	1–1	Eeles	3,327
13 March 1993	Carlisle United (H)	1–0	Smith	3,307
20 March 1993	Hereford United (A)	1–3	Crown	2,188
23 March 1993	Lincoln City (H)	3–1	Green, Forster (2)	2,906
27 March 1993	Darlington (A)	1–1	Crane	2,404
2 April 1993	York City (H)	1–4	Baker	3,912
6 April 1993	Shrewsbury Town (H)	1–0	Crown	3,086
12 April 1993	Scunthorpe United (H)	1–1	Baker	3,854
16 April 1993	Colchester United (A)	0–3		4,695
1 May 1993	Halifax Town (H)	2–0	Eeles, Baker	7,151
8 May 1993	Torquay United (A)	1–2	Baker	4,645

=== Partial league table ===
Football League Third Division final table, bottom positions
Pos	Team	Pld	W	D	L	GF	GA	GD	Pts	Promotion or relegation
17	Hereford United	42	10	15	17	47	60	−13	45	
18	Carlisle United	42	11	11	20	51	65	−14	44	
19	Torquay United	42	12	7	23	45	67	−22	43	
20	Northampton Town	42	11	8	23	48	74	−26	41	
21	Gillingham	42	9	13	20	48	64	−16	40	
22	Halifax Town	42	9	9	24	45	68	−23	36	Relegated to Football Conference

== Cup matches ==
=== FA Cup ===
As a Third Division team, Gillingham entered the 1992–93 FA Cup in the first round and were paired with Kettering Town of the Football Conference, the fifth tier of English football, who had entered the competition in the fourth and final qualifying round. Kettering took the lead in the first half before Gillingham scored twice. Despite being forced to substitute their goalkeeper due to an injury before half-time, with former Gillingham midfielder Ian Docker taking over in goal, the Conference team levelled the scores in the second half and nearly held on for a draw. Forster scored a winner in the 85th minute, however, meaning that Gillingham progressed past the first round of the FA Cup for the first time in five seasons. In the second round their opponents were fellow Third Division team Colchester United. The initial match, at Priestfield, resulted in a 1–1 draw, necessitating a replay at Layer Road in Colchester. Gillingham won the replay 3–2 with goals from Forster, Andy Arnott and Henry. The Premier League and First Division teams entered the competition in the third round, but Gillingham were paired with Huddersfield Town of the Second Division. The initial match at Priestfield ended in a goalless draw, meaning another replay. Gillingham lost 2–1 in the replay at Leeds Road and were eliminated from the competition.

==== Match details ====
Key

- In result column, Gillingham's score shown first
- H = Home match
- A = Away match
- pen. = Penalty kick
- o.g. = Own goal

Results

Date	Round	Opponents	Result	Goalscorers	Attendance
14 November 1992	First	Kettering Town (H)	3–2	Clark, Crown, Forster	3,962
5 December 1992	Second	Colchester United (H)	1–1	Crown	5,319
16 December 1992	Second (replay)	Colchester United (A)	3–2	Forster, Arnott, Henry	4,440
2 January 1993	Third	Huddersfield Town (H)	0–0		5,413
13 January 1993	Third (replay)	Huddersfield Town (A)	1–2	Green (pen.)	5,144

=== Football League Cup ===
As a Third Division team, Gillingham entered the 1992–93 Football League Cup in the first round and were paired with Northampton Town; the first leg of the two-legged tie took place only three days after Gillingham had played Northampton in the first league match of the season. Gillingham won both legs, 2–0 at home and 2–1 away, and thus won the tie 4–1 on aggregate. In the second round, they played Southampton of the Premier League. The first leg took place at Priestfield and drew a crowd of 7,488, the largest attendance recorded at the stadium during the season. Despite playing a team from three levels higher, Gillingham achieved a 0–0 draw. In the second leg at The Dell, however, the Premier League team won 3–0 to eliminate Gillingham from the competition.

==== Match details ====
Key

- In result column, Gillingham's score shown first
- H = Home match
- A = Away match
- pen. = Penalty kick
- o.g. = Own goal

Results

Date	Round	Opponents	Result	Goalscorers	Attendance
18 August 1992	First (first leg)	Northampton Town (H)	2–1	Crown, Lovell	2,245
18 August 1992	First (second leg)	Northampton Town (A)	2–0	Crown, Aylott	2,390
23 September 1992	Second (first leg)	Southampton (H)	0–0		7,488
7 October 1992	Second (second leg)	Southampton (A)	0–3		6,764

=== Football League Trophy ===
The 1992–93 Football League Trophy, a tournament exclusively for Second and Third Division teams, began with a first round in which the teams were drawn into groups of three, contested on a round-robin basis. Gillingham were grouped with Leyton Orient and Fulham, both of the Second Division. The first group game took place on 1 December and resulted in Orient defeating Gillingham 4–1. A week later, Gillingham played at home to Fulham and drew 3–3 in front of a crowd of 1,085, the lowest of the season at Priestfield. Fulham and Orient drew 2–2 in the final group game on 15 December, meaning that Gillingham finished bottom of the three-team group and were eliminated from the competition.

==== Match details ====
Key

- In result column, Gillingham's score shown first
- H = Home match
- A = Away match
- pen. = Penalty kick
- o.g. = Own goal

Results

Date	Round	Opponents	Result	Goalscorers	Attendance
1 December 1992	First	Leyton Orient (A)	1–4	Aylott	1,667
8 December 1992	First	Fulham (H)	3–3	Henry (2), O'Connor	1,085

== Players ==
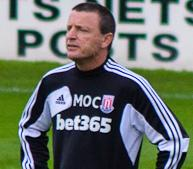
Mark O'Connor (pictured in 2013) made 32 appearances.

Thirty-one players made at least one appearance for Gillingham during the season. Tony Butler made the most, playing in 50 of the team's 53 competitive matches. Four other players played over 40 times: Neil Smith (49), Green (48), Clark (44) and Barrett (42). Three players made only one appearance each: Kevin Hunt, Matt Joseph, and Osborne. Player-manager Roeder only included himself in the starting line-up on seven occasions out of a possible thirty-five, mainly due to injury.

Seventeen players scored at least one goal for the team. Crown was the highest scorer, with 5 goals in the Football League, 2 in the FA Cup, and 2 in the League Cup. His total of 9 goals was the lowest with which a player had finished a season as Gillingham's top scorer since the 1930s. Baker, Arnott and Forster were joint top scorers in Football League matches alone, each scoring 6 Third Division goals.

Player statistics
Player	Position	Third Division		FA Cup		League Cup		League Trophy		Total	
Player	Position	Apps	Goals	Apps	Goals	Apps	Goals	Apps	Goals	Apps	Goals
Andy Arnott	MF	15	6	5	1	2	0	0	0	22	7
Trevor Aylott	FW	10	2	1	0	2	1	2	1	15	4
Paul Baker	FW	21	6	0	0	0	0	0	0	21	6
Scott Barrett	GK	34	0	4	0	3	0	1	0	42	0
Gary Breen	DF	29	0	4	0	4	0	0	0	37	0
Tony Butler	DF	41	0	5	0	4	0	0	0	50	0
Richard Carpenter	MF	28	0	3	0	2	0	0	0	33	0
Paul Clark	DF	35	1	5	1	4	0	0	0	44	2
Steve Crane	FW	7	1	0	0	0	0	0	0	7	1
David Crown	FW	20	5	2	2	2	2	0	0	24	9
Mark Dempsey	MF	16	0	3	0	1	0	2	0	22	0
Joe Dunne	DF	4	0	0	0	1	0	0	0	5	0
Tony Eeles	MF	14	2	2	0	1	0	0	0	17	2
Nicky Forster	FW	23	6	3	2	3	0	0	0	29	8
Richard Green	DF	39	3	4	1	3	0	2	0	48	4
Paul Hague	DF	1	0	0	0	0	0	2	0	3	0
Liburd Henry	FW	28	1	3	1	4	0	2	2	37	4
Scott Houghton	MF	3	0	0	0	0	0	0	0	3	0
Kevin Hunt	MF	0	0	0	0	0	0	1	0	1	0
Matt Joseph	DF	0	0	0	0	0	0	1	0	1	0
Harvey Lim	GK	8	0	1	0	1	0	1	0	11	0
Steve Lovell	FW	13	3	0	0	4	1	0	0	17	4
Eliot Martin	DF	22	1	3	0	0	0	0	0	25	1
Mark O'Connor	MF	21	1	5	0	4	0	2	1	32	2
Lawrence Osborne	MF	1	1	0	0	0	0	0	0	1	1
Lee Palmer	DF	10	0	3	0	1	0	2	0	16	0
Paul Ritchie	FW	6	3	0	0	0	0	0	0	6	3
Glenn Roeder	DF	6	0	0	0	0	0	1	0	7	0
Neil Smith	MF	39	3	4	0	4	0	2	0	49	3
Paul Stephenson	MF	12	2	0	0	0	0	2	0	14	2
Paul Watson	DF	1	0	0	0	0	0	2	0	3	0

FW = Forward, MF = Midfielder, GK = Goalkeeper, DF = Defender

== Aftermath ==
Top goalscorer Crown left the club at the end of the season and joined Dagenham & Redbridge of the Conference. Aylott, who had played only one game since Christmas, also moved on, as did midfielder Mark O'Connor. In July, Roeder resigned as manager to take the equivalent role at Watford of the First Division, one of the clubs for which he had played. Watford were later fined £10,000 (equivalent to £30,000 in 2023) by the Football Association, the governing body of the sport in England, for making an illegal approach to Roeder. Mike Flanagan was promoted from reserves and youth coach to become Gillingham's new manager. In the 1993–94 season, he led Gillingham to a 16th-place finish in the Third Division.
