= 1993–94 Gillingham F.C. season =

English football club season

Gillingham
1993–94 season
- Chairman: Bernard Baker
- Manager: Mike Flanagan
- Third Division: 16th
- FA Cup: Second round
- League Cup: First round
- League Trophy: First round
- Top goalscorer: League: Nicky Forster (18); All: Nicky Forster (18)
- Highest home attendance: 4,573 vs Northampton Town (27 December 1993)
- Lowest home attendance: 1,091 vs Colchester United (28 September 1993)
Home colours	Away colours

During the 1993–94 English football season, Gillingham F.C. competed in the Football League Third Division, the fourth tier of the English football league system. It was the 62nd season in which Gillingham competed in the Football League, and the 44th since the club was voted back into the league in 1950. Prior to the season, Glenn Roeder resigned as the club's manager and was replaced by Mike Flanagan. The team struggled in August and September and did not win a Third Division match until the eighth league game of the season. A week later, Gillingham won away from home in the Football League for the first time in 18 months. Gillingham's form remained inconsistent and, although they climbed to 10th in the 22-team league table in October, the team spent most of the season in the bottom half and finished 16th.

Gillingham also competed in three knock-out competitions. The team reached the second round of the FA Cup but failed to progress beyond the earliest stage of the Football League Cup or Football League Trophy. The team played a total of 49 competitive matches, winning 14, drawing 17, and losing 18. Nicky Forster was the team's top goalscorer, with 18 goals, all scored in the Football League. He also made the most appearances, playing in 46 of the team's 49 competitive matches. The highest attendance recorded at the club's home ground, Priestfield Stadium, was 4,573, for a game against Northampton Town.

== Background and pre-season ==
The 1993–94 season was Gillingham's 62nd season playing in the Football League and the 44th since the club was elected back into the League in 1950 after being voted out in 1938. It was the club's fifth consecutive season in the English football league system's fourth tier, which had been renamed from the Football League Fourth Division to the Third Division after the teams in the top division broke away from the Football League to form the new FA Premier League in 1992. Gillingham had finished 21st in the 22-team division in the 1992–93 season, narrowly avoiding relegation into non-League football.

Gillingham's manager, Glenn Roeder, resigned in July to manage Watford of the First Division, one of the clubs he had played for. Watford were later fined £10,000 (equivalent to £20,000 in 2025) by the Football Association, the governing body of the sport in England, for making an illegal approach to Roeder. Mike Flanagan was promoted from reserves and youth coach to become Gillingham's new manager. One of his first moves as manager was to sign veteran Neil Smillie from Brentford and appoint him to a player-coach role. Gary Micklewhite, another highly experienced player, joined Gillingham from Derby County.

A new kit was introduced designed to mark the club's centenary, adding panels of black and white stripes to the usual blue shirts, which were worn with white shorts and socks; the club's original shirts when it was founded in 1893 had featured black and white stripes. The away kit, to be worn in the event of a clash of colours with the home team, was all red with similar black and white panels on the shirts. The team prepared for the new season with a number of friendly matches, including one against Charlton Athletic of the First Division. Alan Gough, a goalkeeper who had recently left Fulham, played on a trial basis against Charlton but Gillingham opted not to sign him to a contract.

== Third Division ==
=== August–December ===
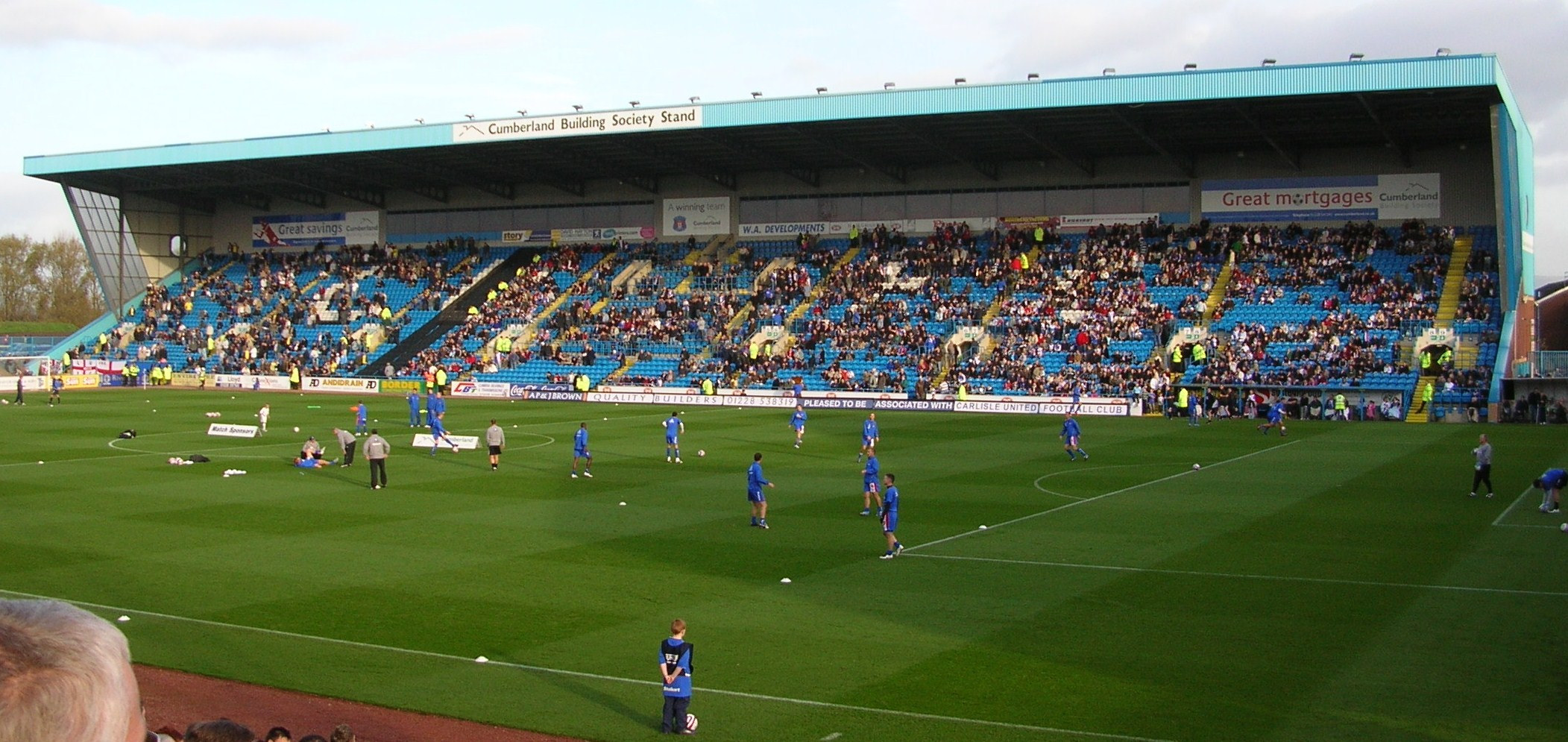
Gillingham's win at Carlisle United's Brunton Park (pictured in 2007) was the club's first league victory away from home for more than 18 months.

Gillingham's first match of the season was at their home ground, Priestfield Stadium, against Chesterfield. Both Smillie and Micklewhite made their debuts in a game which finished 2–0 to Gillingham's opponents; a week later the team again lost without scoring a goal, losing 3–0 away to Rochdale. Gillingham's next five league games all ended in draws; Paul Baker scored the team's first league goal in the first of these games, a 2–2 draw at home to Scarborough. Steve Banks, a 21-year old goalkeeper who had joined the club five months earlier, made his debut in the following game at home to Doncaster Rovers, replacing the previous season's regular goalkeeper, Scott Barrett. After a late goal from Nicky Forster gave the team a third consecutive league draw against Wycombe Wanderers, Flanagan told the press that "the sign of a good side is that they can roll their sleeves up and battle back."

Following their run of five consecutive league draws, which set a new club record, Gillingham were 18th in the 22-team league table. The team won their first league game of the season at the eighth attempt, defeating Scunthorpe United 1–0 on 25 September with a goal from Smillie. One week later, Gillingham gained their second league win of the season, defeating Carlisle United 2–1 with two goals from Forster despite Baker being sent off after less than 15 minutes; it was the first time the team had won away from home in the Football League since March 1992. The team's run of seven league games without defeat ended when they lost 1–0 away to Walsall on 9 October; Barrett was recalled to the team for the next game, in which Gillingham beat Darlington 2–1 at Priestfield with goals from Andy Arnott and Neil Smith to rise to 14th in the table. Gillingham's next game, away to Crewe Alexandra, resulted in a 1–0 defeat, but the team then won two consecutive home games, defeating Colchester United 3–0 and Hereford United 2–0. The two victories took the team up to 10th place in the table. Forster scored in both games, taking his total of league goals for the season to 7, more than any Gillingham player had achieved in the whole of the previous season.

Banks resumed the position of goalkeeper in early November and would remain in the starting line-up until April. Following the win over Hereford on 2 November, Gillingham lost four of the next five games and slipped to 17th in the division. The run included consecutive defeats in the first three matches of December against Lincoln City, Rochdale, and Chesterfield; against Rochdale Baker was sent off again. Forster scored Gillingham's second goal against Chesterfield, meaning that he had scored in six of the last seven league games. Gillingham ended their losing run in the final game of 1993 on 27 December, beating Northampton Town 1–0 at home with an own goal from Steve Terry; the attendance of 4,573 was the largest recorded at Priestfield during the season. The start of the match was delayed by 40 minutes as an electricity board worker had to be called out to disengage a timer switch which prevented the floodlights being turned on on weekday afternoons. Gillingham ended the year 17th in the table.

=== January–May ===
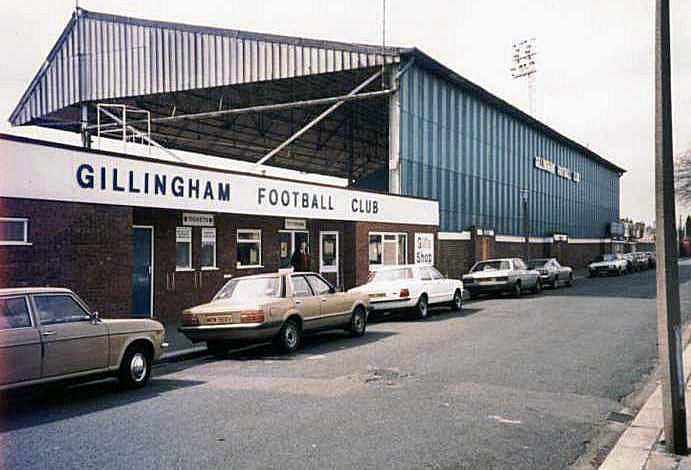
Gillingham's first game of 1994 was a home win at Priestfield Stadium (pictured c. 1987) against Bury.

Gillingham began 1994 with a second consecutive 1–0 win at Priestfield, defeating Bury with a goal from Smillie on 1 January; the result took the team back up to 14th in the table. Two days later, Banks kept a third consecutive clean sheet as Gillingham drew 0–0 away to Doncaster; it was the first league game since October in which Gillingham failed to score a goal. Having failed to score in four consecutive games, Forster was relegated to the substitutes' bench for the game at home to Walsall on 22 January and was replaced in the starting line-up by Baker, who made his first appearance since before Christmas and scored in a 1–1 draw. Seven days later, Forster came off the bench to score the winning goal away to Colchester in the final minute of the game.

Forster once again came on as a substitute and scored in Gillingham's first match of February, a 3–1 defeat at home to Crewe. It was the first in a run of five league games in which Gillingham achieved no wins and scored only two goals. Forster returned to the starting line-up for the game away to Preston North End on 12 February but failed to score and the game finished goalless. The last game of February and the first of March both resulted in 1–0 defeats, at home to Wycombe and away to Chester City. Gillingham ended their winless run with a 1–0 win away to Torquay United on 5 March, but lost again seven days later away to Shrewsbury Town. The team had now not won at home in more than two months and had slipped to 15th in the table. In the final game of March, Forster scored for the first time in eight games as Gillingham defeated Carlisle 2–0 at Priestfield.

Gillingham began the month of April with a second consecutive victory, winning 2–1 away to Northampton, and followed this with two consecutive 2–2 draws at Priestfield, against Chester and Preston. Forster scored both goals against Preston, the second time that he had scored twice in a game; no other Gillingham player scored more than a single goal in a game during the season. Gillingham failed to score in the next two games; in the first of these games Gillingham's Tony Butler was sent off and Chris Pike scored two penalty kicks to give Hereford a 2–0 victory. Gillingham ended their winless run of four games when Forster scored the only goal of the game against Mansfield Town on 23 April. The final match of the season was a 1–1 draw at home to Lincoln; Richard Carpenter's goal was one of only two scored by Gillingham in the final five games of the season. Veteran former club captain Paul Clark was recalled to the team for the first time since January, and made what turned out to be his final appearance for the club. The result left Gillingham 16th in the final league table with 51 points, 13 points below the play-offs for potential promotion to the Second Division and 13 points above 22nd-placed Northampton, who were relegated from the Football League. Gillingham had the 12th best home record in the division but their overall position suffered from the fact that only two Third Division teams had a worse season away from home.

=== Match details ===
Key

- In result column, Gillingham's score shown first
- H = Home match
- A = Away match
- pen. = Penalty kick
- o.g. = Own goal

Results
Date	Opponents	Result	Goalscorers	Attendance
14 August 1993	Chesterfield (H)	0–2		3,485
21 August 1993	Rochdale (A)	0–3		2,092
28 August 1993	Scarborough (H)	2–2	Baker, Forster	2,526
31 August 1993	Doncaster Rovers (H)	0–0		2,923
4 September 1993	Wycombe Wanderers (A)	1–1	Forster	6,226
11 September 1993	Torquay United (H)	2–2	Forster, Green (pen.)	2,927
18 September 1993	Shrewsbury Town (A)	2–2	Baker, Green (pen.)	2,811
25 September 1993	Scunthorpe United (H)	1–0	Smillie	2,872
2 October 1993	Carlisle United (A)	2–1	Forster (2)	6,449
9 October 1993	Walsall (A)	0–1		4,639
16 October 1993	Darlington (H)	2–1	Arnott, Smith	3,063
23 October 1993	Crewe Alexandra (A)	0–1		3,611
30 October 1993	Colchester United (H)	3–0	Green, Forster, Reinelt	3,964
2 November 1993	Hereford United (H)	2–0	Arnott, Forster	3,168
6 November 1993	Mansfield Town (A)	1–2	Forster	2,421
20 November 1993	Wigan Athletic (H)	2–2	Forster, Baker	2,751
27 November 1993	Lincoln City (A)	1–3	Baker	2,979
11 December 1993	Rochdale (H)	1–2	Forster	2,493
18 December 1993	Chesterfield (A)	2–3	Micklewhite, Forster	2,348
27 December 1993	Northampton Town (H)	1–0	Terry (o.g.)	4,573
1 January 1994	Bury (H)	1–0	Smillie	3,576
3 January 1994	Doncaster Rovers (A)	0–0		1,830
15 January 1994	Darlington (A)	1–2	Henry	2,111
22 January 1994	Walsall (H)	1–1	Baker	3,211
29 January 1994	Colchester United (A)	2–1	Smith, Forster	3,273
5 February 1994	Crewe Alexandra (H)	1–3	Forster	3,713
12 February 1994	Preston North End (A)	0–0		6,167
19 February 1994	Scarborough (A)	1–1	Baker	1,527
26 February 1994	Wycombe Wanderers (H)	0–1		4,302
1 March 1994	Chester City (A)	0–1		3,128
5 March 1994	Torquay United (A)	1–0	Green	3,353
12 March 1994	Shrewsbury Town (H)	0–2		3,095
19 March 1994	Scunthorpe United (A)	1–1	Baker	2,386
26 March 1994	Carlisle United (H)	2–0	Carpenter (pen.), Forster	2,627
2 April 1994	Northampton Town (A)	2–1	Carpenter, Forster	4,628
4 April 1994	Chester City (H)	2–2	Baker, Butler	3,165
12 April 1994	Preston North End (H)	2–2	Forster (2)	2,453
16 April 1994	Hereford United (A)	0–2		1,964
19 April 1994	Bury (A)	0–0		1,687
23 April 1994	Mansfield Town (H)	1–0	Forster	2,464
30 April 1994	Wigan Athletic (A)	0–2		1,346
7 May 1994	Lincoln City (H)	1–1	Carpenter (pen.)	2,759

=== Partial league table ===
Football League Third Division final table, positions 13 to 18
Pos	Team	Pld	W	D	L	GF	GA	GD	Pts
13	Bury	42	14	11	17	55	56	−1	53
14	Scarborough	42	15	8	19	55	61	−6	53
15	Doncaster Rovers	42	14	10	18	44	57	−13	52
16	Gillingham	42	12	15	15	44	51	−7	51
17	Colchester United	42	13	10	19	56	71	−15	49
18	Lincoln City	42	12	11	19	52	63	−11	47

== Cup matches ==
=== FA Cup ===
As a Third Division team, Gillingham entered the 1993–94 FA Cup in the first round and were drawn to play away to Yeading of the Isthmian League Premier Division, two levels lower in the English football league system, who had progressed through four qualifying rounds to reach this stage of the competition for the first time. The game was played at Church Road, home of Yeading's local rivals Hayes, as the police deemed the crowd segregation facilities at Yeading's ground, The Warren, to be inadequate. Gillingham were held to a 0–0 draw by their semi-professional opponents, necessitating a replay at Priestfield. In the second match, Gillingham scored three goals in the first half and ultimately won 3–1. In the second round, Gillingham played away to Plymouth Argyle of the Second Division; Richard Green missed a penalty for Gillingham, who lost 2–0.

==== Match details ====
Key

- In result column, Gillingham's score shown first
- H = Home match
- A = Away match
- pen. = Penalty kick
- o.g. = Own goal

Results
Date	Round	Opponents	Result	Goalscorers	Attendance
13 November 1993	First	Yeading (A)^{[a]}	0–0		2,285
30 November 1993	First (replay)	Yeading (H)	3–1	Smith, Micklewhite, Baker	2,285
4 December 1993	Second	Plymouth Argyle (A)	0–2		6,051

a. The match was played at Hayes's Church Road ground, but remained officially a home game for Yeading rather than being considered to have taken place at a neutral venue.

=== Football League Cup ===
As a Third Division team, Gillingham entered the 1993–94 Football League Cup in the first round and were paired with Brighton & Hove Albion of the Second Division. The first leg of the two-legged tie took place at Priestfield and Gillingham defeated their higher-level opponents 1–0 with a goal from Robbie Reinelt. Eight days later, however, Brighton won the second leg at the Goldstone Ground 2–0 and eliminated Gillingham from the competition by an aggregate score of 2–1.

==== Match details ====
Key

- In result column, Gillingham's score shown first
- H = Home match
- A = Away match
- pen. = Penalty kick
- o.g. = Own goal

Results
Date	Round	Opponents	Result	Goalscorers	Attendance
17 August 1993	First (first leg)	Brighton & Hove Albion (H)	1–0	Reinelt	3,330
25 August 1993	First (second leg)	Brighton & Hove Albion (A)	0–2		4,410

=== Football League Trophy ===
The 1993–94 Football League Trophy, a tournament exclusively for Second and Third Division teams, began with a round in which the teams were drawn into groups of three, contested on a round-robin basis. Gillingham were grouped with fellow Third Division team Colchester United and Cambridge United of the Second Division. Gillingham's first group match was at home to Colchester in late September and resulted in a 0–0 draw; the attendance of 1,091 was the lowest recorded at Priestfield during the season. Five weeks later, Gillingham played their second group game away to Cambridge and lost 2–0. With only one point from the two games, Gillingham finished third in the group and failed to qualify for the second round, ending their participation in the competition.

==== Match details ====
Key

- In result column, Gillingham's score shown first
- H = Home match
- A = Away match
- pen. = Penalty kick
- o.g. = Own goal

Results
Date	Round	Opponents	Result	Goalscorers	Attendance
28 September 1993	First (group)	Colchester United (H)	0–0		1,091
9 November 1993	First (group)	Cambridge United (A)	0–2		1,463

== Player details ==
During the course of the season, 24 players played for Gillingham in competitive matches. Forster made the most appearances, playing in 46 of the team's 49 games; he missed only one Third Division match and both of the team's two League Trophy games. Mark Dempsey made the fewest appearances, playing only one game.

Eleven players scored at least one goal for the team. Forster was the highest scorer with 18 goals, all scored in Third Division matches. No other player reached double figures; Baker came closest with 9 goals but no other player scored more than 4.

Player statistics
Player	Position	Third Division		FA Cup		League Cup		League Trophy		Total	
Player	Position	Apps	Goals	Apps	Goals	Apps	Goals	Apps	Goals	Apps	Goals
Andy Arnott	FW	10	2	1	0	1	0	0	0	12	2
Paul Baker	FW	33	8	3	1	0	0	2	0	38	9
Steve Banks	GK	29	0	3	0	0	0	1	0	33	0
Scott Barrett	GK	13	0	0	0	2	0	1	0	16	0
Gary Breen	DF	22	0	1	0	0	0	1	0	24	0
Tony Butler	DF	27	1	3	0	2	0	1	0	33	1
Richard Carpenter	MF	40	3	2	0	1	0	1	0	44	3
Paul Clark	DF	13	0	2	0	1	0	2	0	18	0
Steve Crane	FW	6	0	0	0	2	0	2	0	10	0
Mark Dempsey	MF	0	0	0	0	0	0	1	0	1	0
Joe Dunne	DF	37	0	3	0	1	0	0	0	41	0
Tony Eeles	MF	0	0	0	0	2	0	1	0	3	0
Nicky Forster	FW	41	18	3	0	2	0	0	0	46	18
Richard Green	DF	39	4	2	0	2	0	1	0	44	4
Paul Hague	DF	1	0	0	0	0	0	2	0	3	0
Liburd Henry	FW	14	1	0	0	0	0	0	0	14	1
Eliot Martin	DF	9	0	1	0	1	0	2	0	13	0
Gary Micklewhite	MF	29	1	2	1	2	0	0	0	33	2
Lee Palmer	DF	28	0	3	0	0	0	1	0	32	0
Robbie Reinelt	DF	25	1	3	0	1	1	2	0	31	2
Neil Smillie	MF	38	2	1	0	2	0	0	0	41	2
Neil Smith	MF	35	2	3	1	1	0	1	0	40	3
Robin Trott	DF	1	0	0	0	0	0	1	0	2	0
Paul Watson	DF	14	0	0	0	2	0	1	0	17	0

FW = Forward, MF = Midfielder, GK = Goalkeeper, DF = Defender

== Aftermath ==
Eight days after the last game of the season, the club staged a gala centenary match at Priestfield featuring two teams of past and present Gillingham players managed by former Gillingham player Ernie Morgan and former manager Keith Peacock. Gillingham offered top scorer Forster a new contract, but he turned it down and instead signed for Brentford of the Second Division. Flanagan remained as manager for the next season, during which the team again struggled. In January 1995, after several seasons spent near the bottom of the Football League coupled with nearly a decade of financial difficulties, the club was declared insolvent and placed in receivership. Flanagan was made redundant by the administrators and replaced by Smillie for the remainder of the season. Gillingham finished the season 19th in the Third Division, but the club's continued existence remained in doubt. In June 1995, however, the club was saved from going out of business when it was purchased by businessman Paul Scally.
