= Chris Dorrian =

English footballer (born 1982)

Personal information
- Full name: Christopher Stewart Dorrian
- Date of birth: 3 April 1982 (age 44)
- Place of birth: Harlow, England
- Height: 1.75 m (5 ft 9 in)
- Position: Defender

Youth career
- Leyton Orient

Senior career*
Years	Team	Apps	(Gls)
2000–2002	Leyton Orient	5	(0)
2001	→ Dover Athletic (loan)	14	(0)
2002	Chelmsford City	4	(0)
- Harlow Town
- Bishop's Stortford
- Thurrock
- Sawbridgeworth Town
- Takeley
- * Club domestic league appearances and goals

Christopher Stewart Dorrian (born 3 April 1982) is an English former footballer who played as a defender.

== Career ==
Dorrian began his career in the academy at Leyton Orient, making his debut for the club in a 1–0 win against Plymouth Argyle in the Third Division on 12 August 2000, deputising in place for the injured Matt Joseph. In August 2001, Dorrian was sent out on loan to Dover Athletic. At Dover, Dorrian made 14 league appearances in a four-month loan spell. After a further seven appearances in all competitions for Leyton Orient, Dorrian was released by the club in March 2002. At the end of the 2001–02 season, following his release from Orient, Dorrian made four appearances for Chelmsford City.

In 2002, Dorrian signed for hometown club Harlow Town. Following his time at Harlow, Dorrian played for Bishop's Stortford, Thurrock, Sawbridgeworth Town and Takeley.
