= Stephen Crane (disambiguation) =

Stephen Crane (1871–1900), was an American author.

Stephen, Steven or Steve Crane may also refer to:

- Joseph Stephen Crane (1916–1985), actor and restaurateur
- Stephen Crane (Continental Congress) (1709–1780), U.S. Continental Congress delegate for New Jersey
- Steve Crane (b. 1972), footballer
- Steven Crane (DC Comics)
