= Tony Butler (footballer) =

English footballer

Personal information
- Full name: Philip Anthony Butler
- Date of birth: 28 September 1972 (age 54)
- Place of birth: Stockport, England
- Height: 6 ft 2 in (1.88 m)
- Position: Defender

Youth career
- Gillingham

Senior career*
Years	Team	Apps	(Gls)
1991–1996	Gillingham	148	(5)
1996–1999	Blackpool	99	(0)
1999–2000	Port Vale	19	(0)
2000–2002	West Bromwich Albion	70	(1)
2002	→ Bristol City (loan)	11	(1)
2002–2005	Bristol City	87	(3)
2005–2006	Blackpool	32	(1)
2006–2007	Forest Green Rovers	9	(2)
2006–2007	→ Newport County (loan)		
2007	Hinckley United		
2007	Alfreton Town		
Total		475	(13)
- * Club domestic league appearances and goals

Philip Anthony Butler (born 28 September 1972) is an English former footballer. A defender, he made 468 league appearances in a 15-year career in the English Football League.

He began his career at Gillingham in 1991, helping the club to win promotion out of the Third Division in 1995–96. He was sold to Blackpool in August 1996 for £225,000 before he was moved on to Port Vale for a £115,000 fee in March 1999. He then joined West Bromwich Albion in March 2000 for £140,000, and helped the "Baggies" to promotion out of the First Division in 2001–02. Following this, he was allowed to sign with Bristol City, and he helped his new side to the Football League Trophy in 2003. He returned to Blackpool in February 2005, before he signed with Conference club Forest Green Rovers in July 2006. He was loaned out to Newport County before he joined Hinckley United in February 2007. He switched to Alfreton Town in November 2007.

== Career ==
=== Gillingham ===
As a child, Butler moved to Redcar with his family – his father was a bank manager – and attended Ryehills School. He started his professional career at Gillingham in 1991–92, who were then a Fourth Division under the management of Damien Richardson. They finished second-from-bottom in the English Football League in 1992–93 under Glenn Roeder, avoiding relegation because they finished just four points ahead of Halifax Town. They finished 16th in 1993–94 under Mike Flanagan, before dropping to 19th in 1994–95. Butler played 42 games in 1995–96, as new boss Tony Pulis led the Priestfield Stadium club to promotion out of the Third Division (fourth tier) in second place. He made 179 appearances for the "Gills" in league and cup competitions, scoring seven goals.

=== Blackpool ===
Butler was sold to Blackpool in August 1996 for £225,000. He played 46 games in 1996–97 under Gary Megson, as the Bloomfield Road club finished one place and four points behind Crewe Alexandra in the Second Division play-off zone. New boss Nigel Worthington played him 43 times in 1997–98, as the "Seasiders" slipped to 12th. He made 23 appearances in 1998–99, with Blackpool on the way to another mid-table finish.

=== Port Vale and West Brom ===
He signed for Port Vale for a £115,000 fee in March 1999. He played just four games, as Brian Horton's "Valiants" managed to retain their First Division status despite a poor start to 1998–99. He featured 15 times in 1999–2000, before he left Vale Park for league rivals West Bromwich Albion in March 2000 for a £140,000 fee, as one of four deadline-day signings made by manager Gary Megson. Butler featured seven times for the "Baggies" in 1999–2000, as Megson steered the club away from the relegation zone – whilst Port Vale went down. He made 51 appearances in 2000–01, as Albion reached the play-offs, only to be defeated by Bolton Wanderers at the semi-final stage. It was in this season that he scored his only goal for the club, in a 2–1 loss to Birmingham City. He featured 23 times as the club won promotion as runners-up in 2001–02, finishing ten points behind champions Manchester City. He featured in the "Battle of Bramall Lane" on 16 March 2002, replacing Lárus Sigurðsson (the only "Baggies" player to have been booked) 14 minutes before the match was abandoned. With the club now in the Premier League, he found himself surplus to requirements at The Hawthorns and was loaned out to Bristol City, for whom he subsequently signed permanently.

=== Bristol City and return to Blackpool ===
He played for City in the final of the Football League Trophy at the Millennium Stadium, as the "Robins" beat Carlisle United 2–0. They also reached the play-offs in 2002–03, but were beaten by Cardiff City at the semi-final stage; Butler played 51 games throughout the campaign. He played 46 games in 2003–04, including the play-off final at the Millennium Stadium, where Danny Wilson's men were beaten 1–0 by Brighton & Hove Albion. He played 27 games under new boss Brian Tinnion in 2004–05, before leaving Ashton Gate for former club Blackpool on a free transfer in February 2005. They finished the season 16th in League One under Colin Hendry. Butler played 26 games in 2005–06, as Blackpool avoided relegation by just two places and three points, and was released by manager Simon Grayson. He scored once for Blackpool, his goal coming in a 4–2 win over Doncaster Rovers.

=== Later career ===
Butler joined Gary Owers' Forest Green Rovers in July 2006. During the 2006–07 season he was loaned out to Conference South side Newport County. In February 2007, Butler joined Hinckley United of the Conference North. He was released by Hinckley in November 2007, and subsequently signed for league rivals Alfreton Town.

== Career statistics ==
Appearances and goals by club, season and competition
Club	Season	League			FA Cup		Other		Total	
Club	Season	Division	Apps	Goals	Apps	Goals	Apps	Goals	Apps	Goals
Gillingham	1990–91	Fourth Division	6	0	0	0	0	0	6	0
Gillingham	1991–92	Fourth Division	5	0	0	0	3	0	8	0
Gillingham	1992–93	Third Division	41	0	5	0	4	0	50	0
Gillingham	1993–94	Third Division	27	1	3	0	3	0	33	1
Gillingham	1994–95	Third Division	33	2	3	0	4	0	40	2
Gillingham	1995–96	Third Division	36	2	2	0	4	1	42	3
Gillingham	Total		148	5	13	0	18	1	179	6
Blackpool	1996–97	Second Division	42	0	1	0	5	1	48	1
Blackpool	1997–98	Second Division	37	0	2	0	4	0	43	0
Blackpool	1998–99	Second Division	20	0	0	0	0	0	20	0
Blackpool	Total		99	0	3	0	9	1	111	1
Port Vale	1998–99	First Division	4	0	0	0	0	0	4	0
Port Vale	1998–99	First Division	15	0	0	0	0	0	15	0
Port Vale	1999–2000	First Division	0	0	0	0	0	0	0	0
Port Vale	Total		19	0	0	0	0	0	19	0
West Bromwich Albion	1999–2000	First Division	7	0	0	0	0	0	7	0
West Bromwich Albion	2000–01	First Division	44	1	1	0	6	0	51	1
West Bromwich Albion	2001–02	First Division	19	0	1	0	3	0	23	0
West Bromwich Albion	Total		70	1	2	0	9	0	81	1
Bristol City	2002–03	Second Division	38	1	3	0	10	0	51	1
Bristol City	2003–04	Second Division	38	1	1	0	7	0	46	1
Bristol City	2004–05	League One	22	2	2	0	3	0	27	2
Bristol City	Total		98	4	6	0	20	0	124	4
Blackpool	2004–05	League One	8	0	0	0	0	0	8	0
Blackpool	2005–06	League One	24	1	0	0	2	0	26	1
Blackpool	Total		32	1	0	0	2	0	34	1
Forest Green Rovers	2006–07	Conference Premier	9	2	0	0	0	0	9	2
Career total			475	13	24	0	58	2	557	15

== Honours ==
Gillingham

- Football League Third Division second-place promotion: 1995–96

West Bromwich Albion

- Football League First Division second-place promotion: 2001–02

Bristol City

- Football League Trophy: 2002–03
