= Nicky Forster =

English footballer (born 1973)

Personal information
- Full name: Nicholas Michael Forster
- Date of birth: 8 September 1973 (age 53)
- Place of birth: Caterham, England
- Height: 5 ft 10 in (1.78 m)
- Position: Striker

Senior career*
Years	Team	Apps	(Gls)
1991	Horley Town		
1992–1994	Gillingham	67	(24)
1992	→ Margate (loan)	1	(1)
1992	→ Hythe Town (loan)		
1994–1997	Brentford	109	(39)
1997–1999	Birmingham City	68	(11)
1999–2005	Reading	187	(59)
2005–2006	Ipswich Town	24	(8)
2006–2007	Hull City	35	(5)
2007–2010	Brighton & Hove Albion	98	(40)
2010	→ Charlton Athletic (loan)	8	(2)
2010–2011	Brentford	18	(1)
2011	Lingfield	4	(6)
2012–2013	Dover Athletic	6	(0)
Total		625	(196)

International career
1995	England U21	4	(1)

Managerial career
- 2011: Brentford
- 2011–2013: Dover Athletic
- 2015–2016: Staines Town
- * Club domestic league appearances and goals

Nicholas Michael Forster (born 8 September 1973) is an English former professional footballer who was most recently the manager of Staines Town. Forster has also been player-manager at Brentford and manager of Dover Athletic.

== Career ==
=== Early years ===
Forster, who was born in Caterham, Surrey, was spotted playing for non-league Horley Town and invited for trials by Gillingham in December 1991. After impressing with the youth and reserve teams he signed a professional contract in May 1992, making his debut the following September. He starred for the club during the otherwise disappointing 1993–94 season, scoring 18 goals, but at the end of the season he turned down a new contract and instead joined Brentford for £320,000, a move which provoked bad feeling from Gillingham fans which persisted for many years.

=== Brentford and Birmingham City ===
While at Brentford, Forster formed prolific partnerships with Carl Asaba and Robert Taylor, both of whom would later join his former club Gillingham. He made 109 league appearances for Brentford and scored 39 goals during his time at Griffin Park. He was later capped by England at under-21 level soon afterwards. In January 1997, Forster moved to Birmingham City for a fee of £700,000. He made 67 league appearances and scored eleven league goals for the club.

=== Reading ===
Two years later he was on the move again, this time to Reading, where he spent six years at the club at a cost of £650,000 between 1999 and 2005. Forster receives part of the credit for salvaging Reading's 1999–2000 season, during which the club rose from Division Two's relegation zone at Christmas to a finish in the top ten under caretaker manager Alan Pardew. However, an injured Forster was unable to contribute to the club's good fortune the following season. However, he did return in time for the 2000–01 Division Two play-off semi final against Wigan Athletic. In the second leg with Wigan leading 1–0 on aggregate, Forster came on as a late substitute. He set up Martin Butler for the equaliser before winning a penalty; after Jamie Cureton's effort was saved, Forster scored from the rebound. Reading were to lose the final 3–2 after extra time to Walsall. He then scored 18 goals the following season as Reading were promoted to Division One.

Forster regards Reading's 2002–03 campaign as his best period of form during his career, when he notched 17 goals, including hattricks against Ipswich Town and Preston North End as Reading finished in fourth place. He scored the opening goal in the play-off semi final against Wolverhampton Wanderers, but went off injured and Reading lost 3–1 on aggregate.

Forster considers the club as "home".

=== Ipswich Town ===
Despite being a popular player at Reading, he was allowed to join Ipswich Town on a free transfer in 2005. Unable to replicate for Ipswich the form he showed with Reading due to several injury setbacks over the 2005–06 season, Forster signed a two-year contract with Hull City on 31 August 2006 for a £250,000 transfer fee. He had been a teammate of Hull City's manager, Phil Parkinson, while at Reading.

=== Hull City ===
During his time at Hull City, Forster made 37 appearances and scored six goals for the club; these totals include one goal in two FA Cup appearances. His form helped propel him to second place in the club's Player of the Year awards for the 2006–07 season.

=== Brighton & Hove Albion ===
In January 2007, Brighton & Hove Albion made an unsuccessful £100,000 bid for Forster. However, at the end of the 2006–07 season, Forster stated his wish to move back to the south of England for family reasons, and eventually signed a three-year contract with Brighton in late June 2007 for a £75,000 fee. He attributed his decision to drop down to Football League One from the Championship to the ambition shown by Brighton manager Dean Wilkins and chairman Dick Knight.

Forster was appointed club captain after the departure of Dean Hammond during January 2008, and confirmed in the role by new manager Micky Adams for the 2008–09 season. He won the League One Player of The Month award for September 2009 after scoring five goals in four League games. Having lost his first-team place after a contract dispute with manager Gus Poyet, Forster left Brighton for Charlton Athletic on 25 March 2010 on loan until the end of the season. At the conclusion of the season, Forster's contract at Brighton expired and he left the club.

=== Brentford (second spell) ===
On 16 June 2010, Forster re-signed for Brentford on a two-year deal. He scored his first goal in his second spell at the club in a 1–1 draw with Exeter City on 14 January 2011. Forster was appointed as temporary manager following the departure of Andy Scott on 3 February 2011, with Mark Warburton as his assistant. On 1 March, it was confirmed Forster would remain first team manager on a permanent basis until the end of the current season. On 19 May 2011, Forster announced his retirement from football to concentrate on management. Earlier that week, it was announced that he had failed to land the Brentford manager's job.

=== Lingfield ===
In 2011, Forster signed for Lingfield of the Sussex County League. He scored twice on his debut in an FA Cup match against Hailsham Town. His first league goals came in his next game for the club in a 3–0 win against AFC Uckfield.

=== Dover Athletic ===
On 27 September 2011, he was appointed player-manager of Dover Athletic after the departure of Martin Hayes. He appeared on the substitutes' bench in the first league match of the season, a 2–2 home draw with Farnborough on 18 August 2012. Forster made his Dover debut as a 46th-minute substitute for Calum Willock in a 1–0 home loss to Chelmsford City on 4 September.

In January 2013, with Dover still third in the table despite five consecutive losses, Forster was placed on gardening leave; the club appointed Chris Kinnear the following day.

=== Staines Town ===
Forster was appointed as the replacement for Marcus Gayle as manager of Staines Town on 8 January 2015, with the task of keeping them in the Conference South. However, Staines Town were relegated to the Isthmian League Premier Division at the end of the 2014–15 season.

== Personal life ==
As of 2020, Forster ran The Spot Wellness Centre in Godstone. His stepson, Jake Forster-Caskey, is also a footballer. Outside of football, Forster has also advised Surrey-based long-distance runner Jack Kavanagh.

== Career statistics ==
=== Club ===
Appearances and goals by club, season and competition
Club	Season	League			FA Cup		League Cup		Other		Total	
Club	Season	Division	Apps	Goals	Apps	Goals	Apps	Goals	Apps	Goals	Apps	Goals
Gillingham	1992–93	Third Division	26	6	3	2	3	0	0	0	32	8
Gillingham	1993–94	Third Division	41	18	3	0	2	0	0	0	46	18
Gillingham	Total		67	24	6	2	5	0	0	0	78	26
Margate (loan)	1992–93	Southern League Southern Div.	1	1	—		—		—		1	1
Brentford	1994–95	Second Division	46	24	2	0	4	0	5 (Note: Three appearances and one goal in Football League Trophy, two appearances and one goal in Second Division play-offs)	2	57	26
Brentford	1995–96	Second Division	38	5	3	0	4	2	2 (Note: Appearance(s) in Football League Trophy)	1	47	8
Brentford	1996–97	Second Division	25	10	3	1	3	1	1	1	32	13
Brentford	Total		109	39	8	1	11	3	8	4	136	47
Birmingham City	1996–97	First Division	7	3	—		—		—		7	3
Birmingham City	1997–98	First Division	28	3	3	0	0	0	0	0	31	3
Birmingham City	1998–99	First Division	33	5	1	0	4	1	0	0	38	6
Birmingham City	Total		68	11	4	0	4	1	0	0	76	12
Reading	1999–2000	Second Division	36	10	2	0	3	0	3	0	44	10
Reading	2000–01	Second Division	9	1	0	0	0	0	3 (Note: Appearances in Second Division play-offs)	1	12	2
Reading	2001–02	Second Division	42	18	1	0	2	0	2	0	48	18
Reading	2002–03	First Division	40	16	2	0	1	0	1 (Note: Appearance in First Division play-offs)	1	48	18
Reading	2003–04	First Division	30	7	0	0	4	4	—		34	11
Reading	2004–05	Championship	30	7	3	2	1	0	—		34	9
Reading	Total		187	59	8	2	11	4	9	2	215	67
Ipswich Town	2005–06	Championship	20	7	0	0	0	0	—		20	7
Ipswich Town	2006–07	Championship	4	1	—		1	0	—		5	1
Ipswich Town	Total		24	8	0	0	1	0	—		25	8
Hull City	2006–07	Championship	35	5	2	1	—		—		37	6
Brighton & Hove Albion	2007–08	League One	41	15	4	2	1	0	2	2	48	19
Brighton & Hove Albion	2008–09	League One	30	12	2	1	1	1	5	2	38	16
Brighton & Hove Albion	2009–10	League One	27	13	5	3	1	0	0	0	33	16
Brighton & Hove Albion	Total		98	40	11	6	3	1	7	4	119	51
Charlton Athletic (loan)	2009–10	League One	8	2	—		—		2 (Note: Appearances in League One play-offs)	0	10	2
Brentford	2010–11	League One	18	1	2	0	2	0	4	0	26	1
Career total			615	190	41	12	37	9	30	10	723	221

== Managerial statistics ==
As of 19 May 2011

Managerial record by team and tenure
Team	From	To	Record					Ref
Team	From	To	P	W	D	L	Win %	Ref
Brentford (caretaker)	3 February 2011	19 May 2011	21	9	5	7	42.9	
Total			21	9	5	7	42.9	—

== Honours ==
=== As a player ===
Brentford

- Football League Second Division runner-up: 1994–95

Reading

- Football League Second Division runner-up: 2001–02

Individual

- PFA Team of the Year: 1994–95 Second Division, 2001–02 Second Division
- Football League One Player of the Month: September 2009

=== As a manager ===
Brentford

- Football League Trophy runner-up: 2010–11
