= Joe Dunne =

Irish footballer & manager (born 1973)

Personal information
- Full name: Joseph John Dunne
- Date of birth: 25 May 1973 (age 53)
- Place of birth: Dublin, Ireland
- Height: 5 ft 8 in (1.73 m)
- Position: Defender

Team information
- Current team: Colchester United (youth team manager)

Youth career
- 1989–1990: Gillingham

Senior career*
Years	Team	Apps	(Gls)
1990–1996	Gillingham	115	(1)
1996–1999	Colchester United	98	(3)
1999	Dover Athletic	11	(2)
1999–2003	Colchester United	62	(3)
Total		286	(9)

International career
1992	Republic of Ireland U21	1	(0)

Managerial career
- 2009: Colchester United (caretaker)
- 2012–2014: Colchester United
- 2018: Cambridge United
- 2019: Bristol Rovers (caretaker)
- * Club domestic league appearances and goals

Joseph John Dunne (born 25 May 1973) is an Irish football manager and former footballer. He is youth team manager at Colchester United.

Dunne played as a defender in the Football League for Gillingham and Colchester United, and briefly played in the Conference for Dover Athletic. He once represented Republic of Ireland at under-21 level. His playing career was ended prematurely after suffering a series of injuries. He began coaching at Colchester United, earning his coaching badges and working his way up from youth level. He became the club's assistant manager when John Ward was appointed manager in 2010, before replacing Ward at the helm in September 2012 having previously acted as caretaker manager for four games in 2009. After guiding the club to League One safety in the 2012–13 and 2013–14 seasons, Dunne left his role on 1 September 2014. He then joined Cambridge United as an assistant manager on 11 May 2015.

== Playing career ==
=== Early life ===
Dunne was born in Dublin and grew up in the city's Inchicore suburb, where he lived with his mother and father. His father died when Dunne was 13, leaving him to be the "man of the house". Determined to make a career for himself in football, Dunne left Ireland for England at the age of 15 at the same time as his friend Mark Kinsella, who had been playing for Home Farm. He went on a week-long trial at Gillingham, but stayed for two weeks and signed for the club without telling his mother.

=== Gillingham ===
Gillingham manager Keith Burkinshaw signed Dunne, but Irishman Damien Richardson had replaced Burkinshaw at the helm by the time Dunne arrived. Dunne signed for the Gills on a professional contract in August 1990 and went on to make 115 league appearances for the club, scoring once.

=== Colchester United ===
Colchester United boss Steve Wignall signed Dunne from Gillingham in March 1996 on a free transfer. Dunne made his debut for the U's on 30 March 1996 at Hartlepool United's Victoria Park, coming on as a substitute for Paul Gibbs. He scored his first goal for the club in the penultimate game of the 1995–96 season, which proved crucial as it was a 90th-minute winner against Mansfield Town to help Colchester into the play-off positions. Dunne missed the play-off matches as the U's lost out to Plymouth Argyle, but Dunne would get his chance to play at Wembley the following season.

Dunne was a member of the Colchester squad that lost the 1997 Football League Trophy Final to Carlisle United in a penalty shoot-out following a 0–0 draw. However, he tasted success the following year as Colchester defeated Torquay United 1–0 at Wembley to win the 1998 Football League Third Division play-off final and promotion to Division Two. However, in the summer of 1999, Dunne was released by new Colchester manager Mick Wadsworth alongside nine other players. Despite his release, his popularity with the fans was proven as Colchester's Evening Gazette newspaper awarded Dunne their 'Player of the Year' award, as voted for by readers and fans. Upon hearing this news, Dunne said that it was "a great honour" and he "couldn't thank the fans enough".

=== Dover Athletic ===
Eleven weeks following his release, Dunne struggled to find a Football League club willing to accommodate him, and Dunne considered quitting football and taking a job outside of the game to support his family after initial interest from Isthmian League club Aldershot Town came to nothing. However, Dunne signed for Football Conference side Dover Athletic in August 1999. He made his debut for the club in their 3–1 home defeat to Doncaster Rovers on 11 September and went on to score two goals in eleven Conference appearances.

=== Return to Colchester United ===
Steve Whitton had replaced Mick Wadsworth in the hot seat at Colchester United, and Whitton made it his job to bring fans' favourite Dunne back to the club. He was captain at Dover and playing well, but Whitton stated that he would go straight into the U's starting line-up for their next fixture, knowing Dunne had previously stated that he would "leap at the chance to come back". He re-signed for a nominal fee on 14 December 1999 on a deal that would see him tied to the club until at least 2001.

Dunne made his second debut for the club in an important 3–0 win at Layer Road against Luton Town on 17 December as the U's looked to turn their season around and pull away from the relegation zone. In an away game against Luton one year later, Dunne was taken off after 31 minutes after clashing with Hatters midfielder Matthew Taylor. He suffered a five-inch vertical gash on his face while making tackle and was subsequently taken to hospital for treatment. He spent three-and-a-half hours in hospital before being released and was able to take the team coach back home following the U's 3–0 victory. He returned to action before the new year.

Dunne managed to make 62 further league appearances in his second spell with Colchester but played his final game on 24 November 2001 when he was stretchered off after 79 minutes with a serious knee injury. During his time out injured, Dunne forfeited his monthly wages in a bid to save his career at the club, having been signed to a rolling-monthly contract. Dunne's recovery process suffered setbacks, and required major reconstruction surgery on cartilage and cruciate ligament injuries. In January 2003, Dunne said that he hoped to be back in action by the end of the 2002–03 season. In April 2003, Dunne finally announced his retirement from League football aged 29.

== International career ==
Dunne represented Republic of Ireland at under-21 level once in 1992, but never received a call-up to the full national squad.

== Managerial career ==
=== Colchester United ===
Colchester United decided to retain Dunne's services immediately after his retirement from the game by appointing him as a youth team coach, working under Micky Cook. Dunne had previously done some scouting work for Colchester manager Phil Parkinson towards the end of the 2002–03 season during his recuperation from his injuries. Dunne replaced Cook as senior youth team coach in August 2003.

Dunne took charge of the U's youth team on their 2004 FA Youth Cup run where they defeated Premiership club Chelsea 2–1 in the third round at Layer Road in December. The young U's side then proceeded to the fifth round of the cup for the first time in the club's history after beating Cardiff City 3–2 in the fourth round. Dunne's team booked their place in the quarter-finals of the competition with a 2–1 away win at Crewe Alexandra in February 2005. A record youth fixture attendance at Layer Road saw 2,900 fans turn out for the quarter-final against rivals Ipswich Town, but the weary Colchester players were thrashed 5–0 by Town on 16 March 2005. Dunne led his youth team to the Youth Alliance Cup final in May 2006, where they took on Preston North End in front of a crowd of 545 at Layer Road. The U's fought back from 2–0 down to take the tie to extra time, where they eventually fell to a 5–2 defeat.

When Colchester United assistant manager Mick Harford departed the club for a similar role with Queens Park Rangers, Dunne was keen to once again stand in as assistant manager to Geraint Williams having done so previously prior to Harford's arrival.

In August 2007, following his good work with the Colchester United youth team, Dunne was promoted within the club to position of reserve team manager having managed the youth team for four seasons. With new assistant manager Micky Adams leaving Colchester by mutual consent to concentrate on a return to full management, Dunne returned as stand-in assistant manager once again in January 2008 while remaining reserve team manager. With Geraint Williams dismissal as Colchester manager in September 2008, Dunne was once again drafted in as assistant manager while former-assistant manager Kit Symons took up caretaker duties until a new manager was found.

Paul Lambert replaced Williams as Colchester manager. In the summer of 2009, Lambert brought in Gary Holt as player-coach, assisting the youth team and Joe Dunne, meaning Dunne could step up to first-team coach duties. but a little under one year later, Lambert walked out on the U's for League One rivals Norwich City. Dunne stepped in to take temporary charge of the first team as caretaker manager. Dunne's first game in charge was against his former club Gillingham on 18 August 2009, as the club put the loss of Lambert behind them to claim a 2–1 victory and remain top of League One. MK Dons ended Colchester's 100% start to the 2009–10 season with a 2–1 victory on 22 August. Dunne ruled himself out of the running for the managers position at the club, stating that he was not one of the 12 possible candidates being interviewed for the job.

Dunne suffered his second successive defeat as U's boss when Leeds United visited the Colchester Community Stadium on 29 August, Aidy Boothroyd was announced as Lambert's successor, as Dunne took charge of Colchester for his final game as caretaker manager. The U's once again faced Gillingham, this time in the Football League Trophy as they bowed out on penalties after the game finished 1–1 in normal time. Dunne said of the experience as caretaker that he "enjoyed the pressure and he enjoyed the challenge" and that "it made him better and made him want to get better", whetting his appetite for more.

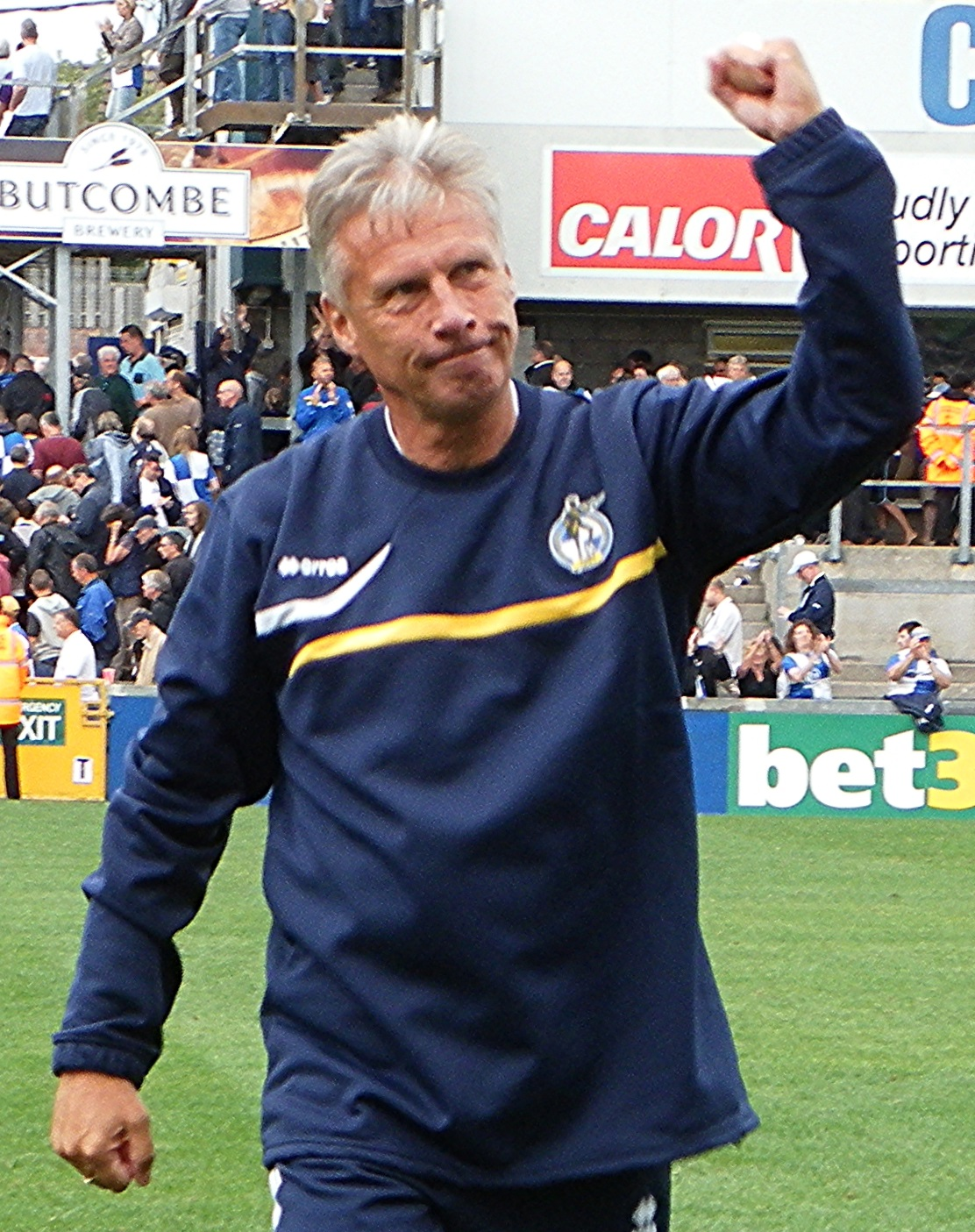
John Ward, whom Dunne succeeded as Colchester United manager

Boothroyd left the U's in May 2010 for Coventry City, as Colchester chairman Robbie Cowling announced that both Boothroyd's former assistant John Ward and Dunne were both in the running for the managerial position. On 31 May, Ward was confirmed as the club's new manager, and Dunne was promoted once again to the position of assistant manager.

Following Ward's dismissal as Colchester manager on 24 September 2012, Dunne was once again made caretaker manager as Cowling began his search for a new manager. However, three days later on 27 September 2012, without managing a game as caretaker, Dunne was appointed full-time manager of Colchester United on a one-year rolling contract. He named former Colchester United midfielder and friend Mark Kinsella as his assistant.

Dunne immediately signed three players on loan; forward Jabo Ibehre from MK Dons and Arsenal duo Craig Eastmond and Sanchez Watt, All three players went straight into the first team squad for Dunne's first match as Colchester manager against Hartlepool United. After falling behind in the sixth minute, Colchester hit back with goals from Gavin Massey and two from new signing Ibehre to win 3–1. After winning four of his first seven games, ending the club's eight-game winless start to the 2012–13 season, Dunne considered quitting the club in January 2013 following a record ninth consecutive loss for Colchester, with the club struggling at the lower end of League One. However, he stayed on to help the U's narrowly avoid relegation to League Two with a final-day 2–0 win at Carlisle United, the club finished 20th in the league table.

With Cowling's and Dunne's emphasis on producing quality players raised through the Colchester United Academy and blooding them for first team action, Dunne said he was "fine" with the U's relegation tag as they headed into the 2013–14 season. During the first half of the season, Dunne gave first-team debuts to Conor Hubble, Sammie Szmodics and Macauley Bonne having already brought Alex Gilbey, Freddie Ladapo and Tosin Olufemi into the first-team picture during the 2012–13 season. Chairman Cowling was pleased that his investments in the youth team had begun producing players that were able to break into the first-team.

Dunne was nominated for the Football League One Manager of the Month award for the month of January 2014 after steering his side into the top-half of the League One table with two high-scoring wins and a solid draw at MK Dons. It was the second time Dunne had been nominated, after being shortlisted in November 2012 but pipped to the prize by Sheffield United manager Danny Wilson. Once again however, Dunne was beaten to the accolade, this time by Leyton Orient boss Russell Slade.

Following a string of four successive defeats and a winless start to the 2014–15 season, Dunne left Colchester United by mutual consent on 1 September 2014, ending his 18-year association with the club. Colchester United chairman Robbie Cowling stated Dunne decided to go as he felt he took things as far as he could.

=== Cambridge United ===
In 2015, Dunne joined Cambridge United as assistant to Shaun Derry. Following Derry's departure in February 2018, Dunne was appointed as interim manager of the club until the end of the season before being officially appointed as manager on a three-year deal in May 2018. However, he was sacked on 1 December 2018 due to poor results leaving the club 21st in the league table.

=== Bristol Rovers ===
On 22 February 2019, Dunne joined Graham Coughlan's coaching staff at Bristol Rovers on a voluntary basis until the end of the season. He was appointed as assistant manager in June 2019. Dunne was caretaker manager of Rovers for the FA Cup second round replay against Plymouth Argyle where he oversaw a 1-0 win.

=== Mansfield Town ===
Following Coughlan's departure to Mansfield Town in December 2019, Dunne joined him at the Nottinghamshire club as assistant manager. Dunne was sacked from the post on 28 October 2020.

=== Stevenage ===
Dunne joined League Two club Stevenage on 1 December 2020, taking on the role of assistant manager to Alex Revell. After a week in his new position, Dunne left his role at the club for personal reasons.

=== Colchester United ===
In March 2021, Dunne returned to Colchester United to assist interim manager Wayne Brown.

In January 2022, following the return of Wayne Brown as interim manager, Dunne again returned to the club as interim assistant coach. On 17 May 2022, Brown and Dunne were given the job on a permanent basis. On 18 September 2022, Brown and Dunne were sacked by Colchester.

=== Newport County ===
On 21 October 2022 Dunne was again appointed assistant manager to Graham Coughlan at League Two Newport County. On 20 June 2024, Coughlan and Dunne departed the club by mutual consent.

=== Gillingham ===
On 15 November 2024, Dunne returned to League Two club Gillingham, the club where he had started his career, in the role of Youth Team Manager.

=== Colchester United ===
On 24 February 2026, Dunne was appointed Lead Under 18s Coach at his former club Colchester United.

== Career statistics ==
=== As a player ===
Club	Season	League			FA Cup		League Cup		Other		Total	
Club	Season	Division	Apps	Goals	Apps	Goals	Apps	Goals	Apps	Goals	Apps	Goals
Gillingham	1990–91	Fourth Division	26	0	1	0	2	0	3 (Note: Appearances in Football League Trophy)	0	32	0
Gillingham	1991–92	Fourth Division	11	0	0	0	0	0	0	0	11	0
Gillingham	1992–93	Third Division	4	0	0	0	1	0	0	0	5	0
Gillingham	1993–94	Third Division	37	0	3	0	1	0	0	0	41	0
Gillingham	1994–95	Third Division	35	1	1	0	2	0	1	0	39	1
Gillingham	1995–96	Third Division	2	0	1	0	1	0	2	0	6	0
Gillingham	Total		115	1	6	0	7	0	6	0	134	1
Colchester United	1995–96	Third Division	5	1	0	0	0	0	0	0	5	1
Colchester United	1996–97	Third Division	32	0	0	0	3	1	0	0	35	1
Colchester United	1997–98	Third Division	25	2	4	0	0	0	4 (Note: Appearances in Football League play-offs)	0	33	2
Colchester United	1998–99	Second Division	36	0	1	0	1	0	1	0	39	0
Colchester United	Total		98	3	5	0	4	1	5	0	112	4
Dover Athletic	1999–2000	Conference	12	2	0	0	–		0	0	12	2
Colchester United	1999–2000	Second Division	20	0	0	0	0	0	0	0	20	0
Colchester United	2000–01	Second Division	34	1	1	0	3	0	1	0	39	1
Colchester United	2001–02	Second Division	8	2	1	0	1	0	0	0	10	2
Colchester United	Total		62	3	2	0	4	0	1	0	69	3
Career total			287	9	13	0	15	1	12	0	327	10

=== As a manager ===
As of 27 November 2018

Managerial record by team and tenure
Team	From	To	Record				
Team	From	To	P	W	D	L	Win %
Colchester United (caretaker)	18 August 2009	1 September 2009	4	1	1	2	25.0
Colchester United	27 September 2012	1 September 2014	95	27	20	48	28.4
Cambridge United (caretaker)	9 February 2018	2 May 2018	14	6	4	4	42.9
Cambridge United	2 May 2018	1 December 2018	26	8	4	14	30.8
Total			139	42	29	68	30.2

== Honours ==
=== As a player ===
Colchester United

- Football League Third Division play-offs: 1998
- Football League Trophy runner-up: 1996–97

=== As a manager ===
Colchester United Youth

- Youth Alliance Cup runner-up: 2006

All honours referenced by:

== Personal life ==
Dunne's son Louis was a member of the Colchester United Academy programme. He rapidly progressed through the age groups at the club, playing at higher levels. He was called up by Republic of Ireland under-15s in April 2013 and featured in Ireland's 3–0 defeat to Finland on 18 April 2013.
