= Tim Dalton =

Irish footballer

Tim Dalton (born 14 October 1965) is an Irish former footballer.

== Career ==
During his career he played for Coventry City, Bournemouth, Notts County and later moved to Boston United, Bradford City, Tranmere Rovers, Cork City and Derry City FC of the League of Ireland, where he won an Irish domestic treble in 1989, Airdrie United and Gillingham FC, and also with Institute.

After retiring from playing he began a coaching career as a goalkeeper coach. He has worked with numerous League of Ireland teams: St Patrick's Athletic (2003–04; 2011–12), Dublin City (2005–06), Drogheda United (2006–08) and Cork City (2009), and Shamrock Rovers (2009–11).

He represented his country at the 1984 UEFA European Under-19 Football Championships, the League of Ireland once in 1990 and the Irish League once in 1995. Retired from coaching Shamrock Rovers, and the Irish Schoolboys U15s in 2015.

== Honours ==
- League of Ireland:
  - Derry City 1988/89
- FAI Cup:
  - Derry City 1989
- League of Ireland Cup: 2
  - Derry City 1988/89, 1990/91
- Irish League:
  - Portadown 1995/96
