= Tim O'Shea (footballer) =

Footballer (born 1966)

Personal information
- Full name: Timothy James O'Shea
- Date of birth: 12 November 1966 (age 59)
- Place of birth: Pimlico, England
- Height: 5 ft 11 in (1.80 m)
- Position: Defender

Team information
- Current team: Cray Wanderers (manager)

Youth career
- 1981–1983: Arsenal
- 1983–1984: Tottenham Hotspur

Senior career*
Years	Team	Apps	(Gls)
1983–1988	Tottenham Hotspur	3	(0)
1986	→ Newport County (loan)	10	(0)
1988–1989	Leyton Orient	9	(1)
1989–1992	Gillingham	112	(2)
1992	Brentford	0	(0)
1992	Hong Kong Rangers		
1992–1995	Eastern AA		
1995–1999	Instant-Dict		
1999–2003	Farnborough Town	87	(1)
2003–2004	Welling United	32	(0)

International career
1987	Republic of Ireland U21	2	(0)

Managerial career
- 2008: Grays Athletic
- 2008–2010: Croydon Athletic
- 2010–2011: Lewes
- 2025–: Cray Wanderers
- * Club domestic league appearances and goals

Timothy James O'Shea (born 12 November 1966 in Pimlico) is a former professional footballer who played as a defender. He is the manager of Cray Wanderers. He represented the Republic of Ireland at the 1985 FIFA World Youth Championship. His clubs included Tottenham Hotspur, Leyton Orient and Gillingham, where he made over 100 Football League appearances.

== Career ==
While playing for Instant-Dict in the Hong Kong league, he played three matches for the Hong Kong League team in the Dynasty Cup. As the Hong Kong team consisted of top players in the local league, including foreigners such as O'Shea, it was not an official match of the Hong Kong FA.

On 21 February 2008, Grays Athletic appointed O'Shea as a senior coach to assist Micky Woodward and Gary Phillips with fitness and tactics. On 15 September 2008, he was appointed as manager after chairman Micky Woodward stepped down, but held the post only until the arrival of Wayne Burnett as manager two weeks later.

He moved from Grays to take the position at Croydon Athletic. Under O'Shea, the Rams were promoted to the Isthmian League Premier Division. O'Shea resigned from Croydon on 4 September 2010, after the team's owner Mazhar Majeed was alleged to have been involved in spot fixing in Pakistan cricket matches, resulting in HM Revenue and Customs officials investigating the club. On 25 October 2010, O'Shea was appointed first-team manager of Lewes. He left at the end of the 2010–11 season after Lewes were relegated.

When Neil Smith was appointed as manager of Cray Wanderers in March 2022, he confirmed that O'Shea would be his assistant. In March 2025, O'Shea was promoted to the role of caretaker manager following Smith's departure to Crawley Town. On 17 April 2025, he was given the manager's job permanently for the 2025–26 season.
