= Lawrence Osborne (footballer) =

English footballer

Personal information
- Full name: Lawrence William Osborne
- Date of birth: 20 October 1967 (age 59)
- Place of birth: West Ham, England
- Height: 5 ft 10 in (1.78 m)
- Position: Midfielder

Senior career*
Years	Team	Apps	(Gls)
1985–1987	Arsenal	0	(0)
1987–1988	Newport County	15	(0)
1988–1989	Wycombe Wanderers		
1989–1990	Redbridge Forest		
1990–1991	Maidstone United	53	(8)
1991–1993	Gillingham	6	(1)
- * Club domestic league appearances and goals

Lawrence William Osborne (born 20 October 1967) is an English former professional footballer who played in the Football League for Maidstone United, Newport County and Gillingham.
