= Paul Clark (footballer) =

English footballer and manager

Personal information
- Full name: Paul Peterson Clark
- Date of birth: 14 September 1958 (age 68)
- Place of birth: Benfleet, England
- Height: 5 ft 10 in (1.78 m)
- Position: Defender

Senior career*
Years	Team	Apps	(Gls)
1976–1977	Southend United	33	(1)
1977–1982	Brighton & Hove Albion	79	(9)
1981	→ Reading (loan)	2	(0)
1982–1991	Southend United	278	(3)
1991–1994	Gillingham	90	(1)
1994–1995	Chelmsford City		
1995–1996	Cambridge United	2	(0)
1996–????	Leyton Orient	0	(0)
- Billericay Town

International career
1974	England Schoolboys	7	(0)
1977	England Youth	6	(0)

Managerial career
- 1987–1988: Southend United
- 1992: Gillingham (caretaker)
- * Club domestic league appearances and goals

Paul Peterson Clark (born 14 September 1958) is an English former professional footballer. His clubs included Southend United, Brighton & Hove Albion and Gillingham.

== Career ==
While at Southend United, he was made player-manager during the 1986–87 season. When Paul Lambert left Colchester United three games into the 2009–10 season, Clark was brought in by caretaker manager Joe Dunne as assistant manager until Aidy Boothroyd's appointment as manager.
