= Liburd Henry =

Dominican footballer (born 1967)

Personal information
- Full name: Liburd Algernon Henry
- Date of birth: 29 August 1967 (age 59)
- Place of birth: Roseau, Dominica
- Height: 5 ft 11 in (1.80 m)
- Position: Forward

Senior career*
| Years | Team | Apps | (Gls) |
| 1984–1985 | Colchester United | 0 | (0) |
| 1985–1986 | Rainham Town | | |
| 1986–1987 | Millwall | 0 | (0) |
| 1987 | Leytonstone/Ilford | | |
| 1987–1990 | Watford | 10 | (1) |
| 1988 | → Halifax Town (loan) | 5 | (0) |
| 1990–1992 | Maidstone United | 67 | (9) |
| 1992–1994 | Gillingham | 42 | (2) |
| 1994–1995 | Peterborough United | 1 | (0) |
| 1995 | Eastern AA | 1 | (0) |
| 1995 | Woking | 3 | (0) |
| 1995–1996 | Welling United | 16 | (4) |
| 1996 | Dagenham & Redbridge | | |
| 1996–1997 | Collier Row & Romford | | |
| 1997–1999 | Dover Athletic | 45 | (6) |
| 1999–2000 | Bromley | | |
| 2000 | Tooting & Mitcham United | 11 | (0) |
- * Club domestic league appearances and goals

Liburd Algernon Henry (born 29 August 1967) is a Dominican former professional footballer who played as a forward for Halifax Town, Watford, Maidstone United, Gillingham, Dover Athletic and Peterborough United between 1988 and 1995.
