= Mark Dempsey (Irish footballer) =

Irish footballer

Mark Anthony Peter Dempsey (born 10 December 1972) is an Irish former association football player during the 1990s and 2000s. He was a defender or midfielder who appeared for Gillingham, Leyton Orient, Shrewsbury Town, Barry Town, Bohemians (2 spells), Shelbourne and Drogheda United during his career.

== Career ==
He played his schoolboy football at Cherry Orchard and his promise was noted by then-Football League Cup holders Oxford United, who brought him over for a trial. He impressed them enough to be taken on as a trainee for 18 months. He was a regular for the reserve team but never made the breakthrough to the first team so when his contract expired, he moved to Gillingham under the management of Damien Richardson.

He spent close to five years at Gillingham before moving on to Leyton Orient. He then spent three seasons at Shrewsbury Town under the management of Fred Davis and then Jake King. He had a falling out with King and moved on to Barry Town, where he won the domestic treble.

He returned to Ireland in the summer of 1999 and was made captain of Bohemians. He got injured during the second half of that season but returned in time to play in the FAI Cup Final as Bohs lost to Shelbourne in a replay. In just the third league game of the following season, he broke his ankle and was to miss the rest of the season as Bohs went on to win both the League of Ireland and FAI Cup.

His contract was up so he left to join Shelbourne, however he struggled to get regular first team football and within months had returned to Bohemians where he stayed until the end of the season when he moved north to Drogheda United.

He was capped five times for the Irish under-21 team, scoring one goal.

He was assistant manager at Shamrock Rovers during the 2006 and 2007 seasons.
