= Harvey Lim =

English footballer (born 1967)

Personal information
- Full name: Harvey Choun Lim
- Date of birth: 30 August 1967 (age 59)
- Place of birth: Halesworth, England
- Height: 6 ft 0 in (1.83 m)
- Position: Goalkeeper

Senior career*
Years	Team	Apps	(Gls)
1985–1988	Norwich City	0	(0)
1986	→ Plymouth Argyle (loan)	0	(0)
1988–1989	Kettering Town	9	(0)
1989	Friska Viljor		
1989–1993	Gillingham	90	(0)
1993	→ Kettering Town (loan)	6	(0)
1993–1995	Sing Tao		
- * Club domestic league appearances and goals

Harvey Choun Lim (born 30 August 1967) is an English former professional footballer.

== Playing career ==
A goalkeeper, he was a youth player with Norwich City, but never played for the first team. After spells at Plymouth Argyle (on loan), Kettering Town and Friska Viljor in Sweden, Lim signed for Gillingham in November 1989 as cover for Ron Hillyard. He would go on to be named Player of the Year for 1990–91 and make over 100 first team appearances for the Kent side. After a loan spell at his old side Kettering Town in the Conference, Gillingham released Lim in May 1993.

Lim then signed for Sing Tao of the Hong Kong First Division, in a move facilitated by Mike Trusson, who had made the move from Gillingham to Sing Tao in 1991. A serious neck injury sustained while playing in Hong Kong forced Lim to retire from football at just 27 years old.

Lim held aspirations to play international football for China on the basis of his Fujian-born father, but was informed that he was not eligible upon moving to Hong Kong.

== Personal life ==
He subsequently moved to Whistler, British Columbia and opened an art gallery and picture framing studio.
