= Paul Hague =

English footballer

Personal information
- Full name: Paul Hague
- Date of birth: 16 September 1972 (age 54)
- Place of birth: Shotley Bridge, England
- Position: Central defender

Senior career*
Years	Team	Apps	(Gls)
1991–1994	Gillingham	9	(0)
1993	→ Cork City (loan)	5	(0)
1994–1995	Leyton Orient	18	(1)
1995–1996	Dagenham & Redbridge	6	(0)
1996–1997	Gateshead	19	(0)
Total		57	(1)
- * Club domestic league appearances and goals

Paul Hague (born 16 September 1972) is an English former professional footballer who played in the Football League as a central defender.
