= Matt Joseph =

Barbadian footballer

Matthew Joseph
Personal information
- Full name: Matthew Nathaniel Joseph
- Date of birth: 30 September 1972 (age 54)
- Place of birth: Bethnal Green, England
- Height: 1.68 m (5 ft 6 in)
- Position: Defender

Youth career
- 1985–1990: Arsenal

Senior career*
Years	Team	Apps	(Gls)
1990–1992	Arsenal	0	(0)
1992–1993	Gillingham	1	(0)
1993–1998	Cambridge United	159	(6)
1998–2004	Leyton Orient	249	(3)
2004–2005	Canvey Island	14	(0)
2005	→ Histon (loan)	11	(0)
2005	Histon	2	(0)
2006–2007	Braintree Town	40	(0)
Total		456	(9)

International career
2000	Barbados	2	(0)
- * Club domestic league appearances and goals

Matthew Nathaniel Joseph (born 30 September 1972) is a former professional footballer who played as a defender. He has been a member of the Barbados national team.

== Career ==
Joseph was born in the Bethnal Green area of London to West Indian parents. He played as a midfielder for Arsenal in his youth career and both midfielder and defender at the senior level featured for the club Cambridge United with 159 caps. As well he subsequently left Cambridge in 1998 to join up with Leyton Orient for £10,000. The Barbadian won the Player of the Year award three times while at Orient. Joseph in all appeared a total of 230 times both at and away from Brisbane Road.

Joseph won 16 youth caps while featuring for England. Joseph was also capped twice for Barbados, with both caps coming at home against Guatemala and the United States in 2000.

Joseph is currently a Youth Coach Developer at Arsenal Football Club, Hale End Academy

== Honours ==
- Leyton Orient Player of the Year: 2000, 2001
