= Lee Palmer =

English footballer

Personal information
- Full name: Lee James Palmer
- Date of birth: 19 September 1970 (age 56)
- Place of birth: Croydon, England
- Position: Defender

Youth career
- 1987–1988: Gillingham

Senior career*
Years	Team	Apps	(Gls)
1988–1995	Gillingham	120	(5)
1995	→ Sittingbourne (loan)		
1995–1999	Cambridge United	31	(1)
1996	→ Woking (loan)		
1997	→ Dover Athletic (loan)		
- Folkestone Invicta
- * Club domestic league appearances and goals

Lee James Palmer (born 19 September 1970) is an English former professional footballer. His clubs included Gillingham, where he made 120 Football League appearances, Cambridge United, Woking, Dover Athletic and Folkestone Invicta.
