= Steve Crane =

English footballer (born 1972)

Personal information
- Full name: Steven John Crane
- Date of birth: 3 June 1972 (age 54)
- Place of birth: Grays, England
- Position: Striker

Youth career
- 1988–1990: Charlton Athletic

College career
Years	Team	Apps	(Gls)
1991–1992	Tusculum Pioneers		(99)

Senior career*
Years	Team	Apps	(Gls)
1990–1991	Charlton Athletic	0	(0)
1990	→ Margate (loan)	6	(2)
1991	Margate	8	(0)
1993–1994	Aveley		
1994–1995	Gillingham	13	(1)
1995	Hornchurch		
1995–1996	Chelmsford City	11	(1)
1996	Tilbury		
1996	East Thurrock United		
1996–1997	Papatoetoe		
1997	Torquay United		
1997–1998	Hastings Town	2	(0)
1998–	Billericay Town	2	(?)
1999–c. 2008	Essex Police		
1999	Great Wakering Rovers	2	(0)
- * Club domestic league appearances and goals

Steven John Crane (born 3 June 1972) is an English former professional footballer.

Crane started his professional career with Charlton Athletic in July 1990 as a trainee. In November 1990 he played for Margate on loan, but was recalled by Charlton only a month later. He did not qualify as a member of the Charlton first team and left them in February 1991 without having played in any game. He finally made his first professional appearances on the field when he rejoined Margate in 1991, playing with them for two pre-season games. He left shortly thereafter when he garnered a football scholarship to Tusculum College in the United States, where he studied foreign languages. While at Tusculum he had an impressive playing career, scoring 99 goals in just two seasons. He returned to the UK in December 1992 to join Aveley.
