= Richard Green (footballer) =

English footballer (1967–2026)

Personal information
- Full name: Richard Edward Green
- Date of birth: 22 November 1967
- Place of birth: Wolverhampton, England
- Date of death: 22 October 2026 (aged 58)
- Height: 6 ft 0 in (1.83 m)
- Position: Defender

Youth career
- 1983–1986: Shrewsbury Town

Senior career*
Years	Team	Apps	(Gls)
1986–1991	Shrewsbury Town	125	(5)
1991–1992	Swindon Town	0	(0)
1992–1998	Gillingham	206	(10)
1998–2000	Walsall	30	(1)
1999	→ Rochdale (loan)	6	(0)
2000–2001	Northampton Town	59	(2)
2001–2002	Rochdale	0	(0)
Total		426	(18)
- * Club domestic league appearances and goals

Richard Edward Green (22 November 1967 – 22 October 2026) was an English professional footballer. A defender, he played for Shrewsbury Town, Swindon Town, Gillingham, Walsall, Rochdale and Northampton Town. In total he made 436 Football League appearances in a 16-year professional career, scoring 18 goals.

== Honours ==
Walsall

- Football League Third Division runner-up: 1998–99

Northampton Town

- Football League Third Division third-place promotion: 1999–2000

Individual

- Gillingham Player of the Season: 1992–93, 1993–94
