= Eliot Martin =

English footballer

Personal information
- Full name: Eliot James Martin
- Date of birth: 27 September 1972 (age 54)
- Place of birth: Plumstead, England
- Position: Defender

Youth career
- Gillingham

Senior career*
Years	Team	Apps	(Gls)
1991–1995	Gillingham	60	(1)
1994–1995	→ Chelmsford City (loan)		
1995–2001	Margate		
2001–2002	Gravesend & Northfleet	19	(2)
- * Club domestic league appearances and goals as of 05:23, 16 February 2016 (UTC)

Eliot James Martin (born 27 September 1972) is an English former professional footballer. He played for Gillingham between 1991 and 1995, making 60 appearances in the Football League.
