= Neil Smith (footballer) =

English footballer and manager

Personal information
- Full name: Neil James Smith
- Date of birth: 30 September 1971 (age 55)
- Place of birth: Lambeth, England
- Position: Midfielder

Youth career
- 1990–1991: Tottenham Hotspur

Senior career*
Years	Team	Apps	(Gls)
1991–1997	Gillingham	213	(10)
1997–1999	Fulham	75	(1)
1999–2002	Reading	64	(3)
2002	Stevenage	8	(0)
2002–2007	Woking	142	(5)
2007–2008	Welling United	?	(?)
2008	Bromley	?	(?)
2008	Maidstone United		

Managerial career
- 2007: Woking (interim)
- 2007–2008: Welling United
- 2011–2016: Bromley (assistant)
- 2016: Bromley (interim)
- 2016–2021: Bromley
- 2022–2025: Cray Wanderers
- * Club domestic league appearances and goals

Neil Smith (born Lambeth, 30 September 1971) is an English former professional football player and manager.

== Playing career ==
Smith started his career at Tottenham Hotspur as an apprentice but after a year had failed to break through to the team. He went on loan to Gillingham and then signed for them permanently in 1991, going on to make over 200 appearances. During his time at the Gills in 1995, Smith was on the verge of a move to then Division Two club Brentford. However, when the fee was set at £50,000 by a tribunal, then Brentford manager David Webb felt he could find better value elsewhere, hence the deal fell through and Smith remained at Gillingham for two more seasons.

He moved to Fulham in 1997 for two seasons, making 75 appearances and scoring two goals. He scored once against Colchester in the league and also scored against former club Tottenham Hotspur in the FA Cup, before joining Reading, where he made some 65 appearances in a three-year spell. He was part of promotion-winning sides at Gillingham, Fulham and Reading.

Smith briefly joined Stevenage Borough in 2002 before Glenn Cockerill bought him to Woking where he played a vital part in the escape from relegation that season. He made 180 appearances for Woking and had a short spell as caretaker manager before being released in 2007. He signed for Bromley in 2008 before calling time on his playing career. On 19 July 2008, Kingfield hosted a benefit game for Smith to celebrate the six years he spent at Woking.

Smith joined Isthmian League Premier Division club Maidstone United as a player on 18 October 2008 following his release from the coaching staff at financially troubled Grays Athletic. He made his debut in the FA Trophy 1st qualifying round tie against AFC Hornchurch.

== Managerial career ==
Smith was appointed joint caretaker manager of Woking in March 2007 with Graham Baker following the departure of Glenn Cockerill, helping the club to stay in the Conference National.

On 4 May 2007, after failing to get the job full-time, Smith was released by Woking following the appointment of Frank Gray as manager. Two weeks later Smith was appointed as the new manager of Conference South team Welling United following the departure of Adrian Pennock to Stoke City. He held the job until 7 January 2008, when he was sacked. Shortly after this he signed for Bromley as a player.

Smith joined Grays Athletic as part of their coaching staff on 21 February 2008. He then joined Tim O'Shea, with whom he worked with at Grays, at Croydon Athletic as a coach and again followed O'Shea to Lewes as his assistant. Following Lewes's relegation he re-joined Bromley at the start of 2011–12 as part of the coaching staff. Following the departure of Mark Goldberg in February 2016, Smith took over the role on an interim basis. On 4 April, after a successful run of games, Smith signed a two-year contract to become the club's new first team manager.

Smith was appointed as manager of Cray Wanderers on 22 March 2022.

On 21 March 2025, Smith was appointed assistant manager of League One side Crawley Town following the re-appointment of Scott Lindsey.

== Honours ==
=== As a player ===
Fulham

- Football League Second Division: 1998–99

=== As a manager ===
Bromley

- FA Trophy runner-up: 2017–18
