= Tony Eeles =

English footballer

Personal information
- Date of birth: 15 November 1970 (age 55)
- Place of birth: Chatham, England
- Position: Midfielder

Youth career
- Gillingham

Senior career*
Years	Team	Apps	(Gls)
1988–1994	Gillingham	73	(5)
1993	→ Cork City (loan)		
1994	Dover Athletic		
1996	Sittingbourne		
1997–2001	Ashford Town (Kent)	122	(15)
2001	Welling United		
2001	Ashford Town (Kent)	17	(2)
2004	Ashford Town (Kent)	3	(0)
- * Club domestic league appearances and goals

Anthony George Eeles (born 15 November 1970) is an English former professional footballer who played as a midfielder.

Born in Chatham, Eeles played for Gillingham between 1989 and 1994, scoring 5 goals in 73 appearances. While with the club, he spent time on loan to Cork City. He is credited as the scorer of one of Gillingham's most important goals, which maintained the Gills' Football League status, when he opened the scoring in a 2–0 home victory in 1993 over fellow relegation candidates Halifax Town.

After leaving Gillingham, Eeles played non-league football for Dover Athletic, Sittingbourne, Ashford Town (Kent). and Welling United.

In 2008, whilst working as a plasterer, he was taken seriously ill with dermatomyositis.
