= Damien Richardson (footballer) =

Irish football manager and former player

Personal information
- Full name: Damien John Richardson
- Date of birth: 2 August 1947 (age 79)
- Place of birth: Dublin, Ireland
- Position: Striker

Senior career*
Years	Team	Apps	(Gls)
1963–1972	Shamrock Rovers	110	(41)
1972–1981	Gillingham	323	(94)
1981–1982	Gravesend & Northfleet		
1982–1984	Folkestone Invicta		
1984–1985	Canterbury City		
1985–?	Chatham Town		
- Faversham Town

International career
1971–1979	Republic of Ireland	3	(0)
1968	League of Ireland XI	1	(0)

Managerial career
- 1989–1992: Gillingham
- 1993–1995: Cork City
- 1995: Cobh Ramblers
- 1995–1998: Shelbourne
- 1999–2002: Shamrock Rovers
- 2005–2007: Cork City
- 2010–2011: League of Ireland XI
- 2014: Drogheda United
- * Club domestic league appearances and goals

Damien John Richardson (born 2 August 1947) is an Irish football manager and former player. His most recent job was as manager of Drogheda United. Richardson formerly managed Gillingham in England and Cobh Ramblers, Shelbourne and Shamrock Rovers in Ireland. He is also known for his media work, including Monday Night Soccer.

== Player ==
As a player Richardson's career was divided between Shamrock Rovers and Gillingham. He made his Rovers debut in a 2–1 friendly win over Sunderland at Roker Park on 10 August 1963. His competitive debut came eight days later as Rovers beat Shelbourne 3–0 at Tolka Park in a Dublin City Cup clash. While at Rovers he twice won the FAI Cup in 1968 and 1969 (scoring in the final replay) as well as getting an Inter League cap and represented the club 5 times in the UEFA Cup Winners Cup. He received the first of three international caps for the Irish national team while at Shamrock Rovers, making his debut against Austria in Linz in October 1971. He scored in his final appearance for Rovers on 22 October 1972 at Milltown.

He moved to the English Fourth Division side Gillingham at the age of 25. He played for the Priestfield Stadium side for the next nine years before being released in 1981. During his time there he scored 100 goals and was named Player of the Season for 1974–75.

He subsequently played for a number of Kent-based non-League clubs: Gravesend & Northfleet, Folkestone Invicta, Canterbury City, Chatham Town, and Faversham Town.

== Manager ==
Richardson's managerial career began in April 1989 when he was appointed manager of Gillingham, having served as the club's youth team manager since the previous summer. He was dismissed from the role in 1992, and he returned to Ireland in 1993 to manage Cork City. He proved an instant success bringing the club within striking distance of retaining the league title. However, after 18 months he left the club after a dispute with then chairman Pat O'Donovan.

Following Cork City, he moved on another Cork side Cobh Ramblers before taking up the management position at Shelbourne. His time at Shelbourne saw two Cup successes (1995–96 and 1996–97), one League of Ireland Cup (1995–96) and a runner up position in the League (1997–98) in three seasons. His failure to win the league ultimately cost him his job.

He moved to his old club Shamrock Rovers, where his tenure for three seasons failed to result in a trophy. Ultimately, Richardson and club chairman Joe Colwell disagreed on the direction of the club, and parted ways in April 2002. Colwell wanted to focus on building a new stadium for the club, while Richardson wanted to focus on a full-time panel of players.

In 2005 Richardson returned to League of Ireland management when Cork City's manager Pat Dolan was dramatically sacked before the start of pre-season friendlies. Cork City chairman Brian Lennox signed the 57-year-old Richardson to a two-year contract at Turners Cross 15 days before the first competitive match of the season. Richardson commented that the Cork City job was the only one that could have brought him back to League of Ireland management. Despite being hospitalised in September in his first season in charge Cork City were crowned League of Ireland champions for the second time in the club's history. Cork City also reached the final of the FAI Cup but were defeated by Drogheda United. The 2006 and 2007 seasons saw 4th-place positions for his club in both years. In 2007 Richardson led Cork City to FAI Cup victory, but left shortly afterwards following some controversy, and a financial settlement agreement.

In 2010 Damien was selected by the FAI to manage a League of Ireland XI to play a full-strength Manchester United side in the opening match of the Aviva Stadium in Dublin. Again in 2011 he was selected by the FAI to manage a League of Ireland XI to play in the Dublin Super Cup at the Aviva Stadium.

Richardson was named as the manager of Drogheda United on 26 July 2014 for the remainder of their league campaign.

== Media work ==
In 2002, Richardson left football management to become a TV soccer pundit with TV3 in Ireland, before returning to the game in 2005. He is now a regular pundit on Monday Night Soccer on Raidió Teilifís Éireann, and is also a regular contributor to RTÉ Radio's coverage of Republic of Ireland international matches. He contributed to RTÉ Sport's coverage of the 2010 FIFA World Cup.

Richardson writes a regular blog for the RTÉ / MNS website, and continues to write a weekly column for a Cork newspaper since his time as manager of Cork City.

Richardson has also supported Red FM's national award-winning "Break the Cycle" anti-speeding campaign. In addition to his media work, he occasionally teaches football team management seminars. Richardson also once played the bodhran on an album (A Kentish Garland) by Tundra, a folk music group from Kent.

== Career statistics ==
Appearances and goals by club, season and competition
Club	Season	League			FA Cup		League Cup		Total	
Club	Season	Division	Apps	Goals	Apps	Goals	Apps	Goals	Apps	Goals
Gillingham	1972-73	Division Four	29	14	1	0	0	0	30	14
Gillingham	1973-74	Division Four	43	16	1	1	2	1	46	18
Gillingham	1974-75	Division Three	44	20	1	0	3	1	48	21
Gillingham	1975-76	Division Three	44	9	2	2	3	1	49	12
Gillingham	1976-77	Division Three	37	16	1	0	3	2	41	18
Gillingham	1977-78	Division Three	43	12	4	0	2	0	49	12
Gillingham	1978-79	Division Three	28	4	2	0	2	0	32	4
Gillingham	1979-80	Division Three	42	1	2	0	4	0	48	1
Gillingham	1980-81	Division Three	13	2	0	0	1	0	14	2
Total			323	94	14	3	20	5	357	102

== Honours ==
=== As a player ===
Shamrock Rovers

- FAI Cup: 1968, 1969
- Top Four Cup: 1966
- Dublin City Cup:1966–67
- Blaxnit Cup: 1967–68
- Leinster Senior Cup: 1968–69

Individual

- Gillingham Player of the Season: 1974–75

=== As a manager ===
Shelbourne

- FAI Cup: 1996, 1997
- League of Ireland Cup: 1995–96

Cork City

- League of Ireland Premier Division: 2005
- FAI Cup: 2007

=== Individual ===
- SWAI Personality of the Year: 2005

== Family ==
Richardson's father George also played and managed in the League of Ireland. He played for Bray Unknowns F.C. and Brideville F.C. and managed St Patrick's Athletic in the 1970s.

== Bibliography ==
- The Hoops by Paul Doolan and Robert Goggins (ISBN 0-7171-2121-6)
