= 1988–89 Gillingham F.C. season =

English football club season

Gillingham
1988–89 season
- Chairman: Roy Wood (until February 1989); Martin Lukehurst (thereafter)
- Manager: Paul Taylor (until 26 October); Bill Collins and Damien Richardson (caretakers, 26 October – 31 October); Keith Burkinshaw (31 October – 11 April); Keith Blunt (caretaker, 11 April –18 April); Damien Richardson (caretaker 18 April – 5 May, permanent thereafter)
- Third Division: 23rd
- FA Cup: First round
- League Cup: Second round
- Associate Members' Cup: First round
- Top goalscorer: League: Steve Lovell (14); All: Steve Lovell (17)
- Highest home attendance: 5,871 vs Fulham (26 December 1988)
- Lowest home attendance: 1,970 vs Fulham (10 December 1988)
Home colours	Away colours

During the 1988–89 English football season, Gillingham F.C. competed in the Football League Third Division, the third tier of the English football league system. It was the 57th season in which Gillingham competed in the Football League, and the 39th since the club was voted back into the league in 1950. Gillingham began the season well, with two wins in the first three Third Division games, but then lost ten consecutive league games to slip close to the bottom of the league table. In late October, after the eighth of these defeats, Paul Taylor was dismissed as the club's manager and replaced by Keith Burkinshaw. The new manager could not significantly improve the team's performances, resigning in April with Gillingham bottom of the table. Former Gillingham player Damien Richardson ended the season as the club's manager. Gillingham finished the season 23rd out of 24 teams in the division and were relegated to the Fourth Division.

Gillingham also competed in three knock-out competitions. The team were eliminated in the first round of the FA Cup and the second round of the Football League Cup. Gillingham progressed from the initial group stage of the Associate Members' Cup but lost in the first round proper. The team played a total of 55 competitive matches, winning 15, drawing 5 and losing 35. Steve Lovell was the team's top goalscorer for the second consecutive season; he scored 14 goals in Third Division matches and a total of 17 in all competitions. George Burley, in his only season with the club, made the most appearances; he was absent for only one game. The highest attendance recorded at the club's home ground, Priestfield Stadium, was 5,871 for a league game against Fulham on 26 December 1988.

== Background and pre-season ==
The 1988–89 season was Gillingham's 57th season playing in the Football League and the 39th since the club was elected back into the League in 1950 after being voted out in 1938. It was the club's 15th consecutive season in the Football League Third Division, the third tier of the English football league system, since the team had gained promotion from the Fourth Division as runners-up in 1974. In the 1987–88 season, Gillingham had finished 13th in the Third Division; Keith Peacock was dismissed from his position as the club's manager midway through that season and replaced by his assistant Paul Taylor, who remained in the role at the start of the 1988–89 season. Taylor's management team consisted of John Gorman as assistant manager and former Gillingham player Damien Richardson as youth team coach.

Gillingham's kit for the season added a pattern of thin white lines to the team's traditional blue shirts, which were worn with white shorts and socks. The away kit, to be worn in the event of a clash of colours with the home team, was all-red. Taylor signed one new player ahead of the new season: George Burley, a 32-year-old defender who had played nearly 450 games in the Football League, joined the club from Sunderland. Mel Eves, Les Berry and Graham Pearce all moved on after their playing contracts were not renewed. The team prepared for the new season with a number of friendly matches, including a short tour of France where they played teams including Racing Club de Paris.

== Third Division ==
=== August–December ===
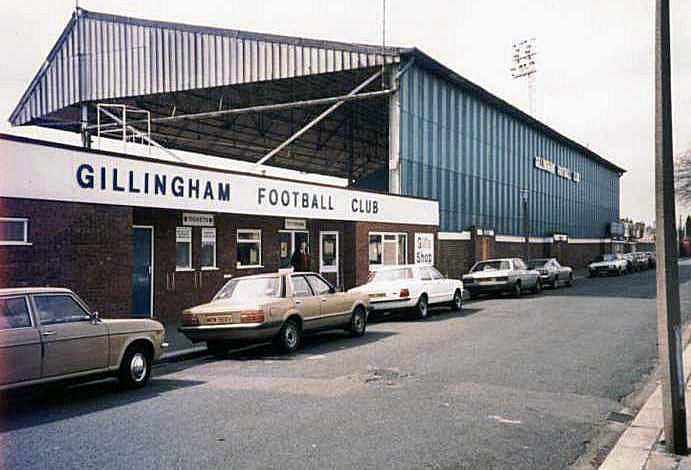
Gillingham's home ground, Priestfield Stadium (pictured c. 1987)

Gillingham's first game of the season took place at their home ground, Priestfield Stadium, on 27 August against Swansea City, who won 3–2; Burley made his debut, as did Brian Clarke, a teenaged defender from the youth team. Gillingham won the next two games, away to Aldershot and at home to Sheffield United; Jerry Williams, a midfielder newly signed from Reading, made his debut in the latter game. Gillingham extended their unbeaten league run to three games with a 1–1 draw against Huddersfield Town on 17 September, in which Steve Lovell scored a goal for the fourth consecutive game. The result left Gillingham sixth in the league table after four games, but the team then began a run of consecutive league defeats which would last for nearly two months. The sequence began with a 2–1 defeat away to Mansfield Town on 20 September and continued with four games in which Gillingham failed to score any goals, losing to Reading, Brentford, Bristol City and Chesterfield, after which the team had fallen to 20th in the table, only one position above the four relegation places.

On 25 October, Gillingham lost 5–0 away to Preston North End, the team's eighth consecutive league defeat; the following day Taylor was dismissed from his role as manager by the club's board of directors. Youth team coach Richardson and Bill Collins, who had retired at the end of the previous season after more than 20 years with the club as youth team coach and later first team trainer, took temporary charge of the team for the game at home to Wolverhampton Wanderers on 29 October, which resulted in another defeat. Two days later, Keith Burkinshaw was confirmed as the club's new manager; the appointment was seen as a coup for Gillingham as Burkinshaw had previously managed at the highest level with Tottenham Hotspur, winning the FA Cup twice and the UEFA Cup once. In his first game in charge, away to Cardiff City, Gillingham lost 1–0, the team's 10th consecutive Third Division defeat. The result left the team in 22nd place, six points below 20th position and off the bottom of the table only on goal difference. The run of consecutive defeats finally came to an end on 8 November when a goal from Burley gave Gillingham a 1–0 win at home to Blackpool.

Gillingham's league results alternated between victory and defeat for the remainder of 1988. Lovell scored twice in a 2–1 win away to Northampton Town on 18 December to take his total league goals for the season to 10; no other Gillingham player had scored more than twice in Third Division games. It was Gillingham's second consecutive away victory following a run of seven away games without a win dating back to early September. On 26 December the team lost 1–0 at home to Fulham in front of a crowd of 5,871, the largest attendance of the season at Priestfield. Gillingham's final match of 1988 resulted in a 1–0 win over Port Vale, who had been second in the league table going into the game; Gillingham finished the year still 22nd in the Third Division, although their position had improved as they were now below 20th place only on goal difference.

=== January–May ===
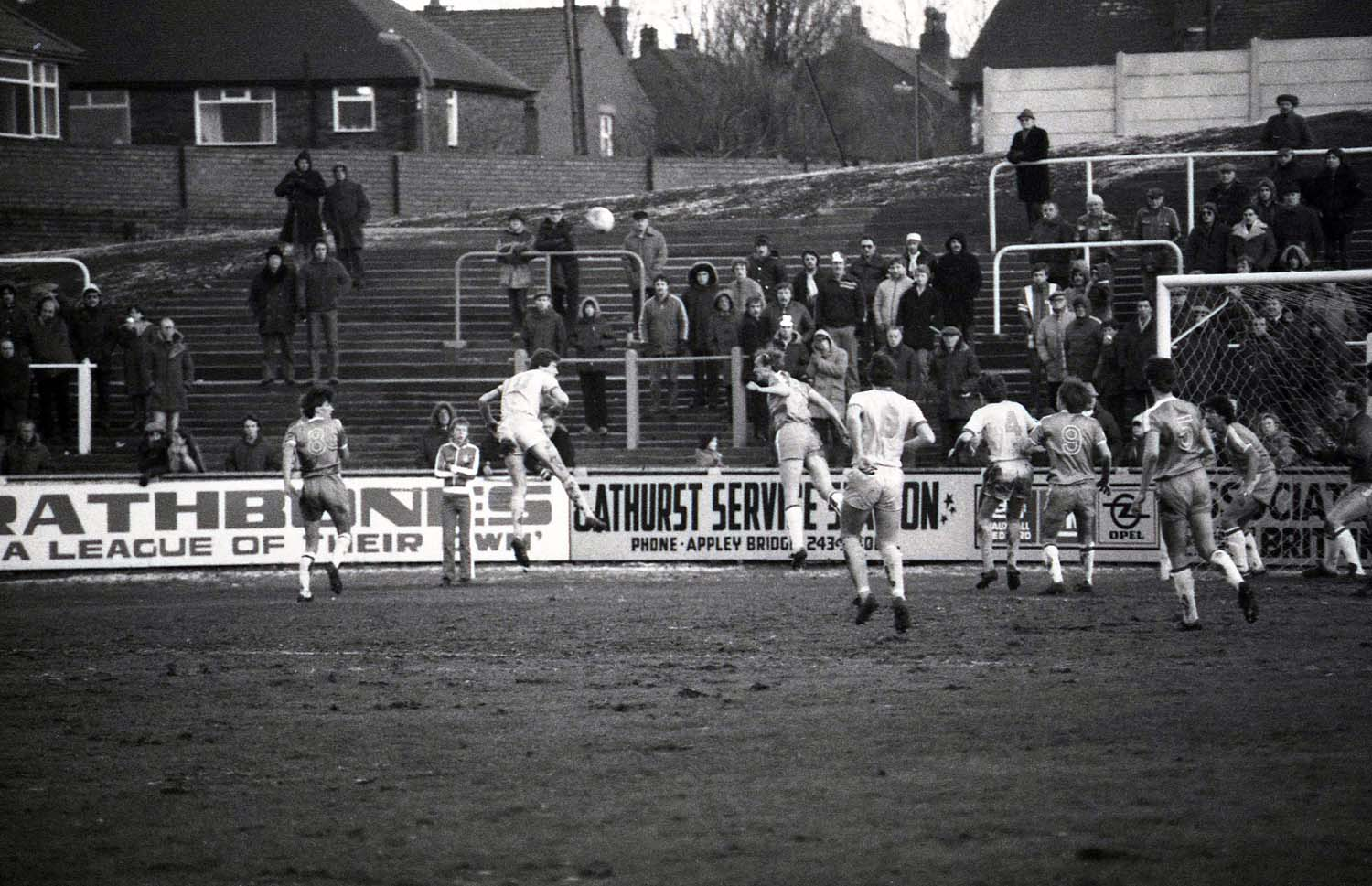
Gillingham's first game of 1989 took place at Springfield Park (pictured in 1982), home of Wigan Athletic.

Gillingham began the new year with a 3–0 defeat away to Wigan Athletic and four days later lost 2–1 away to Bolton Wanderers, although other teams' results meant that Gillingham did not drop any lower in the table, remaining 22nd. They drew 1–1 at home to Aldershot and ended the month with defeats away to Sheffield United and at home to Huddersfield Town. Mark Stimson, a young defender signed on loan from Burkinshaw's former club Tottenham Hotspur of the First Division, made his debut against Sheffield United. At the end of January, Gillingham were 23rd in the table, ahead of bottom-placed Aldershot only on goal difference. Days later, club chairman Roy Wood stepped down after three years and was replaced by Martin Lukehurst. Gillingham's winless run continued throughout February, during which they drew twice and lost three times. After a goalless draw at home to Brentford on 4 February, Gillingham were bottom of the Third Division and remained there at the end of the month.

Burkinshaw continued to sign new players; Tim O'Shea, a defender who had joined from Leyton Orient, played for the first time against Brentford. Two new players debuted on 11 February against Bristol City: another new arrival from Tottenham, midfielder Billy Manuel, and Alan Reeves, a defender signed on loan from Norwich City. Francis Joseph, a forward signed from Sheffield United, debuted against Preston North End on 28 February. Gillingham lost their first two games of March and remained bottom of the table. Pat Gavin, a forward signed on a trial basis from Hanwell Town of the semi-professional Spartan League, made his debut on 14 March against Wolverhampton Wanderers and scored Gillingham's only goal in a 6–1 defeat; it was the first time Gillingham had conceded six goals in a game since December 1987. Gavin also scored in both of the next two games, including a 2–1 win at home to Wigan Athletic on 24 March which gave Gillingham their first victory of 1989. Three days later the team won away to Fulham by the same score, the first occasion on which they had won two consecutive Third Division games since the previous September.

On 11 April, with the team bottom of the Third Division, Burkinshaw resigned as manager. His assistant Keith Blunt was appointed as caretaker manager and the team won their next match against Mansfield Town, but Blunt was himself dismissed after one week in charge and Richardson again put in temporary charge. Barry Bright, the club's chief executive, said that he had received around twenty applications for the managerial position and anticipated drawing up a shortlist of around five, of which Richardson would be one. Richardson's first game in charge ended in the team's second consecutive victory, a 2–1 win away to Reading, but Gillingham lost their next two games. Defeat at Blackpool on 1 May meant that Gillingham could no longer overtake the team then in 20th place, confirming that the club would be relegated to the Fourth Division at the end of the season. Four days later, with two games of the season remaining, Richardson was appointed manager on a permanent basis. The following day, the team lost their third consecutive game, being defeated 2–0 by Chester City. Gillingham's last game of the season resulted in a 2–1 victory at home to Notts County with goals from Gavin and Manuel; Gavin took his total to 7 goals in 13 games but was sent off later in the match. Gillingham finished 23rd in the league table, 14 points below 20th-placed Northampton Town, and were thus relegated to the Fourth Division, ending a spell of 15 years at the third tier of English football.

=== Match details ===
Key

- In result column, Gillingham's score shown first
- H = Home match
- A = Away match
- pen. = Penalty kick
- o.g. = Own goal

Results

Date	Opponents	Result	Goalscorers	Attendance
27 August 1988	Swansea City (H)	2–3	Peacock, Lovell	4,437
3 September 1988	Aldershot (A)	2–0	Shipley, Lovell	2,477
10 September 1988	Sheffield United (H)	2–1	Lovell, Lillis	5,041
17 September 1988	Huddersfield Town (A)	1–1	Lovell	4,688
20 September 1988	Mansfield Town (A)	1–2	Lovell	3,153
24 September 1988	Reading (H)	0–1		4,469
1 October 1988	Brentford (A)	0–1		4,839
4 October 1988	Bristol City (H)	0–1		3,102
8 October 1988	Chesterfield (H)	0–1		2,901
15 October 1988	Southend United (A)	1–2	Lovell	3,200
22 October 1988	Bury (H)	3–4	Lillis, Lovell (pen.), Cooper	2,850
25 October 1988	Preston North End (A)	0–5		6,390
29 October 1988	Wolverhampton Wanderers (H)	1–3	Lovell	5,288
5 November 1988	Cardiff City (A)	0–1		3,658
8 November 1988	Blackpool (H)	1–0	Burley	3,541
12 November 1988	Bristol Rovers (A)	0–2		4,826
26 November 1988	Notts County (A)	2–1	Quow, Smith	4,611
3 December 1988	Chester City (H)	0–2		3,329
18 December 1988	Northampton Town (A)	2–1	Lovell (2, 1 pen.)	3,829
26 December 1988	Fulham (H)	0–1		5,871
30 December 1988	Port Vale (H)	1–0	Cooper	4,706
2 January 1989	Wigan Athletic (A)	0–3		3,090
6 January 1989	Bolton Wanderers (A)	1–2	Peacock	4,187
14 January 1989	Aldershot (H)	1–1	Peacock	3,781
21 January 1989	Sheffield United (A)	2–4	West, Cooper	9,336
28 January 1989	Huddersfield Town (H)	1–2	Peacock (pen.)	3,530
4 February 1989	Brentford (H)	0–0		4,002
11 February 1989	Bristol City (A)	0–1		7,319
18 February 1989	Chesterfield (A)	1–3	Lovell	3,432
25 February 1989	Southend United (H)	1–1	Walker	3,574
28 February 1989	Preston North End (H)	1–3	Burley	3,031
4 March 1989	Bury (A)	0–1		4,313
11 March 1989	Cardiff City (H)	1–2	Boyle (o.g.)	2,927
14 March 1989	Wolverhampton Wanderers (A)	1–6	Gavin	12,574
19 March 1989	Swansea City (A)	2–3	Gavin, Lillis	4,252
24 March 1989	Wigan Athletic (H)	2–1	Gavin, Peacock	3,244
27 March 1989	Fulham (A)	2–1	Peacock (2)	6,476
1 April 1989	Northampton Town (H)	1–0	Gavin	3,466
4 April 1989	Bolton Wanderers (H)	0–1		3,096
8 April 1989	Port Vale (A)	1–2	Lovell	5,358
15 April 1989	Mansfield Town (H)	3–0	Gavin, Peacock, Joseph	2,594
22 April 1989	Reading (A)	2–1	Lovell, Gavin	3,511
28 April 1989	Bristol Rovers (H)	2–3	Lovell (pen.), Smith	4,044
1 May 1989	Blackpool (A)	1–4	Peacock	2,152
6 May 1989	Chester City (A)	0–2		2,106
13 May 1989	Notts County (H)	2–1	Gavin, Manuel	2,877

=== Partial league table ===
Football League Third Division final table, bottom positions
Pos	Team	Pld	W	D	L	GF	GA	GD	Pts	Promotion or relegation
19	Blackpool	46	14	13	19	56	59	−3	55	
20	Northampton Town	46	16	6	24	66	76	−10	54	
21	Southend United	46	13	15	18	56	75	−19	54	Relegated
22	Chesterfield	46	14	7	25	51	86	−35	49	Relegated
23	Gillingham	46	12	4	30	47	81	−34	40	Relegated
24	Aldershot	46	8	13	25	48	78	−30	37	Relegated

== Cup matches ==
=== FA Cup ===
As a Third Division team, Gillingham entered the 1988–89 FA Cup in the first round and were paired with Peterborough United of the Fourth Division. Peterborough took a 2–0 lead but Gillingham then scored three times. Peterborough scored again three minutes from the end of the game, however, and the match ended in a 3–3 draw, necessitating a replay at Peterborough's London Road Stadium. The score in the second match was 0–0 at the end of the regulation 90 minutes, but the rules of the competition meant that, unlike in the first match, 30 minutes of extra time were played. Gillingham's Ivan Haines scored an own goal during the extra period and Gillingham lost 1–0 and were eliminated from the FA Cup.

==== Match details ====
Key

- In result column, Gillingham's score shown first
- H = Home match
- A = Away match
- pen. = Penalty kick
- o.g. = Own goal

Results

Date	Round	Opponents	Result	Goalscorers	Attendance
19 November 1988	First	Peterborough United (H)	3–3	Lovell, Quow, Smith	4,509
23 November 1988	First (replay)	Peterborough United (A)	0–1		4,494

=== Football League Cup ===
As a Third Division team, Gillingham entered the 1988–89 Football League Cup in the first round; their opponents were Cambridge United of the Fourth Division. Gillingham won the first leg of the two-legged tie 2–1 and the second 3–1 to win 5–2 on aggregate. In the second round they were drawn to play Millwall of the First Division, the highest level of English football. Millwall won the first leg 3–0 and the second 3–1 to eliminate Gillingham from the competition.

==== Match details ====
Key

- In result column, Gillingham's score shown first
- H = Home match
- A = Away match
- pen. = Penalty kick
- o.g. = Own goal

Results

Date	Round	Opponents	Result	Goalscorers	Attendance
30 August 1988	First (first leg)	Cambridge United (A)	2–1	Walker, Lovell	1,909
6 September 1988	First (second leg)	Cambridge United (H)	3–1	Lovell, Lillis (2)	3,066
27 September 1988	Second (first leg)	Millwall (A)	0–3		6,590
11 October 1988	Second (second leg)	Millwall (H)	1–3	Quow	5,729

=== Associate Members' Cup ===
The 1988–89 Associate Members' Cup, a tournament exclusively for Third and Fourth Division teams, began with a preliminary round in which the teams were drawn into groups of three, contested on a round-robin basis. Gillingham's group also included fellow Third Division teams Brentford and Fulham. Gillingham first played Brentford and lost 2–0; Brentford had already defeated Fulham and with maximum points from their two games were guaranteed to top the group, meaning that the result of the match between Gillingham and Fulham would determine which team joined them in the first round proper. The match took place at Priestfield and drew a crowd of 1,970, the lowest recorded at the stadium during the season. Gillingham won 2–1 and moved on to the first round, where they were drawn to play Torquay United of the Fourth Division; despite playing a team from the lower division, Gillingham lost the game 3–0 and their participation in the competition came to an end.

==== Match details ====
Key

- In result column, Gillingham's score shown first
- H = Home match
- A = Away match
- pen. = Penalty kick
- o.g. = Own goal

Results

Date	Round	Opponents	Result	Goalscorers	Attendance
29 November 1988	Group stage	Brentford (A)	0–2		3,713
10 December 1988	Group stage	Fulham (H)	2–1	Lillis, Peacock	1,970
17 January 1989	First	Torquay United (A)	0–3		1,844

== Players ==
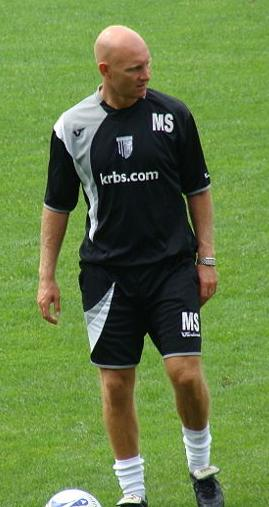
Mark Stimson (pictured in 2008) made 18 appearances during his spell with the club.

Thirty-two players made at least one appearance for Gillingham during the season. Burley made the most; he played in 54 of the team's 55 competitive matches, missing only the second leg of the first round of the League Cup. Gavin Peacock had the second highest number of appearances, with 52, and four other players played between 40 and 50 times: Dave Smith, Lovell, Ian Docker and Paul Haylock. Two players made only one appearance: Eamonn Collins, who had a brief loan spell at Gillingham, and Irvin Gernon, who was transferred to Reading early in the season.

Lovell was the team's top goalscorer, with 14 goals in Third Division matches and a total of 17 in all competitions. It was the second consecutive season in which he was Gillingham's top scorer. Peacock was second highest scorer with 10 goals and Gavin had the third highest total with 7, despite joining the club with only two months of the season remaining.

Player statistics
Player	Position	Third Division		FA Cup		League Cup		Associate Members' Cup		Total	
Player	Position	Apps	Goals	Apps	Goals	Apps	Goals	Apps	Goals	Apps	Goals
Peter Beadle	FW	2	0	0	0	0	0	0	0	2	0
George Burley	DF	46	2	2	0	3	0	3	0	54	2
Brian Clarke	DF	10	0	0	0	2	0	0	0	12	0
Eamonn Collins	MF	0	0	0	0	0	0	1	0	1	0
Mark Cooper	FW	18	3	2	0	3	0	2	0	25	3
Ian Docker	MF	35	0	2	0	2	0	2	0	41	0
Tony Eeles	MF	3	0	0	0	0	0	0	0	3	0
Pat Gavin	FW	13	7	0	0	0	0	0	0	13	7
Irvin Gernon	DF	0	0	0	0	1	0	0	0	1	0
Lindon Guscott	FW	2	0	0	0	0	0	0	0	2	0
Ivan Haines	DF	12	0	2	0	1	0	3	0	18	0
Paul Haylock	DF	31	0	2	0	4	0	3	0	40	0
Ron Hillyard	GK	19	0	0	0	3	0	1	0	23	0
Francis Joseph	FW	15	1	0	0	0	0	0	0	15	1
Phil Kite	GK	27	0	2	0	1	0	2	0	32	0
Jason Lillis	FW	22	3	1	0	3	2	2	1	28	6
Steve Lovell	FW	39	14	2	1	3	2	2	0	46	17
Billy Manuel	MF	17	1	0	0	0	0	0	0	17	1
Tim O'Shea	DF	17	0	0	0	0	0	0	0	17	0
Gavin Peacock	MF	44	9	1	0	4	0	3	1	52	10
Ricky Pearson	DF	3	0	0	0	0	0	0	0	3	0
Andy Perry	FW	13	0	0	0	2	0	0	0	15	0
Trevor Quow	MF	20	1	2	1	4	1	1	0	27	3
Alan Reeves	DF	18	0	0	0	0	0	0	0	18	0
George Shipley	MF	14	1	1	0	2	0	2	0	19	1
Dave Smith	FW	42	2	2	1	2	0	3	0	49	3
Mark Stimson	DF	18	0	0	0	0	0	0	0	18	0
Steve Walford	DF	4	0	0	0	0	0	1	0	5	0
Alan Walker	DF	22	1	2	0	4	1	1	0	29	2
Mark Weatherly	DF	17	0	0	0	3	0	0	0	20	0
Gary West	DF	10	1	0	0	2	0	1	0	13	1
Jerry Williams	MF	13	0	1	0	0	0	2	0	16	0

FW = Forward, MF = Midfielder, GK = Goalkeeper, DF = Defender

== Aftermath ==
Peacock was voted the club's player of the year, but following the team's relegation he was signed by AFC Bournemouth of the Second Division, as was Phil Kite. Smith and Burley also left the club. After he impressed during his trial period with the club, Gillingham signed Gavin to a three-year contract at the end of the season, but it was not registered with the Football League, and Leicester City of the Second Division signed the player, which they were able to do without having to pay any transfer fee as he was not technically under contract at Gillingham. After a Football League inquiry, Gavin's move to Leicester was ruled valid, but it was agreed that he should be loaned back to Gillingham for the 1989–90 season. He could not recapture his previous form, however, and scored only once in 39 games.

Richardson remained as manager for the 1989–90 season, and veteran player Ron Hillyard was appointed to be his assistant. For much of the season, Gillingham were in contention for promotion back to the Third Division at the first attempt, but the team slipped down the table after losing six consecutive games in the latter stages of the season and finished 14th in the Fourth Division. The club ultimately spent seven seasons at the fourth level of English football before achieving promotion in 1996.
