= 2008 FAW Premier Cup final =

2008 Football Association of Wales Premier Cup final
- Event: 2007–08 FAW Premier Cup
| Newport County | Llanelli |
| 1 | 0 |
- Date: 11 March 2008
- Venue: Newport Stadium, Newport
- Attendance: 1,889

The 2008 FAW Premier Cup final was the final of the 11th season of the FAW Premier Cup. The final was played at Newport Stadium in Newport on 11 March 2008 and marked the second time the final has been staged at the stadium. The match was contested by Newport County and Llanelli.

== Route to the final ==
=== Newport County ===
Newport County scores are shown first in every match

| Round | Opposition | Score | Venue | Notes |
|---|---|---|---|---|
| 2 | Bangor City | 1–0 | Newport Stadium | |
| QF | Swansea City | 1–0 | Newport Stadium | |
| SF | Cardiff City | 1–1 | Ninian Park | Newport County won 5–4 on penalties |

=== Llanelli ===
Llanelli scores are shown first in every match

| Round | Opposition | Score | Venue |
|---|---|---|---|
| 2 | Rhyl | 4–1 | Stebonheath Park |
| QF | Wrexham | 4–2 | Stebonheath Park |
| SF | Carmarthen Town | 1–0 | Stebonheath Park |

== Match ==
11 March 2008
19:00

| Newport County | 1–0 | Llanelli |
|---|---|---|
| Hughes 82' | Report |

Newport Stadium, Newport
Attendance: 1,889
Referee: Lee Evans

| Newport County | Llanelli |

NEWPORT COUNTY:
| GK | 1 | (England) Scott James |
| DF | 2 | (Wales) Steve Jenkins (c) |
| DF | 3 | (Wales) Lee Jarman |
| DF | 4 | (England) Paul Cochlin |
| DF | 5 | (Wales) Damon Searle |
| MF | 6 | (Wales) Jason Bowen |
| MF | 7 | (England) Andy Gurney |
| MF | 8 | (Wales) Nathan Davies |
| MF | 9 | (Wales) Richard Evans | (substituted off) 80' |
| FW | 10 | (Wales) Craig Hughes |
| FW | 11 | (England) Charlie Griffin | (substituted off) 75' |
Substitutes:
| FW | 12 | (England) Jermaine Clarke | | (substituted on) 75' |
| MF | 14 | (Wales) Lee Fowler | | (substituted on) 80' |
Manager:
(England) Peter Beadle

LLANELLI:
| GK | 1 | (Wales) Ryan Harrison |
| DF | 2 | (Wales) Stuart Jones |
| DF | 3 | (Wales) Lee Phillips (c) |
| DF | 4 | (Wales) Andrew Mumford |
| DF | 5 | (Wales) Gary Lloyd |
| MF | 6 | (Wales) Craig Jones |
| MF | 7 | (Wales) Chris Holloway |
| MF | 8 | (England) Antonio Corbisiero |
| MF | 9 | (Wales) Andy Legg |
| FW | 10 | (Wales) Mark Pritchard |
| FW | 11 | (Wales) Rhys Griffiths |
Manager:
(Wales) Peter Nicholas

MATCH RULES

- 90 minutes.
- 30 minutes of extra-time if necessary.
- Penalty shoot-out if scores still level.
- Three named substitutes.
- Maximum of three substitutions.
