= 2007 FAW Premier Cup final =

2007 Football Association of Wales Premier Cup final
- Event: 2006–07 FAW Premier Cup
Newport County	The New Saints
0	1
- Date: 21 March 2007
- Venue: Newport Stadium, Newport
- Attendance: 1,809

The 2007 FAW Premier Cup final was the final of the 10th season of the FAW Premier Cup. The final was played at Newport Stadium in Newport on 21 March 2007 and marked the first time the final has been staged at the stadium. The match was contested by Newport County and The New Saints.

== Route to the final ==
=== Newport County ===
Newport County scores are shown first in every match

Round	Opposition	Score	Venue
2	Cefn Druids	2–1	Plaskynaston Lane
QF	Wrexham	2–1	Newport Stadium
SF	Port Talbot Town	2–1	Newport Stadium

=== The New Saints ===
The New Saints scores are shown first in every match

Round	Opposition	Score	Venue
QF	Porthmadog	3–1	The Beach
SF	Cardiff City	1–0	Ninian Park

== Match ==
21 March 2007
19:00

Newport County	0–1	The New Saints
	Report	Beck 6'

Newport Stadium, Newport
Attendance: 1,809
Referee: Lee Evans

Newport County	The New Saints

NEWPORT COUNTY:
GK	1	(England) Mark Ovendale
DF	2	(Wales) Steve Jenkins
DF	3	(Wales) Damon Searle
DF	4	(Wales) Nathan Davies
DF	5	(England) John Brough (c)
MF	6	(Wales) Ian Hillier
MF	7	(Wales) Jason Bowen
MF	8	(Wales) Kris Leek
MF	9	(England) Dean Holdsworth
FW	10	(Wales) Craig Hughes
FW	11	(Wales) Richard Evans
Substitutes:
FW	12	(England) Charlie Griffin
MF	14	(Wales) Stewart Edwards
FW	15	(Wales) Sam O'Sullivan
FW	16	(Wales) Matthew Prosser
DF	17	(Wales) Martyn Giles
Manager:
(England) Peter Beadle

THE NEW SAINTS:
GK	1	(Northern Ireland) Gerard Doherty (c)
DF	2	(England) Phil Baker
DF	3	(England) Duane Courtney
DF	4	(England) Michael Jackson
DF	5	(England) Tommy Holmes
MF	6	(England) John Leah
MF	7	(England) Mike Wilde
FW	8	(Canada) John Toner
MF	9	(England) Steve Beck
MF	10	(Cayman Islands) Jamie Wood
FW	11	(England) Scott Ruscoe
Substitutes:
FW	12	(England) Rob Williams
FW	14	(England) Barry Hogan
FW	15	(England) Greg Stones
FW	16	(Spain) Oscar Gonzalez
GK	17	(England) Lee Williams
Manager:
(England) Ken McKenna

MATCH RULES

- 90 minutes.
- 30 minutes of extra-time if necessary.
- Penalty shoot-out if scores still level.
- Five named substitutes.
- Maximum of three substitutions.
