= 1987–88 Gillingham F.C. season =

English football club season

Gillingham
1987–88 season
- Chairman: Roy Wood
- Manager: Keith Peacock (until 29 December 1987); Paul Taylor (from 29 December 1987)
- Third Division: 13th
- FA Cup: Third round
- League Cup: Second round
- Associate Members' Cup: Group stage
- Top goalscorer: League: Steve Lovell (25); All: Steve Lovell (27)
- Highest home attendance: 9,267 vs Birmingham City (9 January 1988)
- Lowest home attendance: 2,558 vs Leyton Orient (27 October 1987)
Home colours	Away colours

During the 1987–88 English football season, Gillingham F.C. competed in the Football League Third Division. It was the 56th season in which the club competed in the Football League, and the 38th since the club was voted back into the league in 1950. In the previous season, Gillingham had qualified for the final of the play-offs for promotion to the Football League Second Division but had been defeated. The team began the new season strongly, including winning matches 8–1 and 10–0 on consecutive Saturdays, but their performances quickly declined and by December the team had slipped down the league table. After a heavy loss to Aldershot in the last game of 1987, manager Keith Peacock was dismissed from his job and replaced by his former assistant Paul Taylor, a decision which was extremely unpopular with the club's supporters. Although the team's performances improved in the second half of the season, briefly bringing them close to a potential play-off place, their form declined once again and they finished the season 13th in the 24-team division, the same position as when Peacock lost his job.

During the season, Gillingham also reached the third round of the FA Cup and the second round of the Football League Cup, but were eliminated from the Associate Members' Cup at the earliest stage. The team played 55 competitive matches, winning 17, drawing 17, and losing 21. Steve Lovell was the club's leading goalscorer, with 27 goals in all competitions, three times as many as any other player. He also made the most appearances, playing in all of the team's 55 matches; two other players each appeared over 50 times. The highest attendance recorded at the club's home ground, Priestfield Stadium, was 9,267 for an FA Cup match against Birmingham City.

== Background and pre-season ==
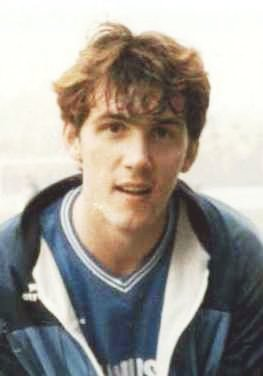
The previous season's top goalscorer, Tony Cascarino (pictured c. 1987), left the club during the summer.

The 1987–88 season was Gillingham's 56th season playing in the Football League and the 38th since the club was elected back into the League in 1950 after being voted out in 1938. It was the club's 14th consecutive season in the Football League Third Division, the third tier of the English football league system, since the team gained promotion from the Fourth Division as runners-up in 1974. In the 13 seasons since then, the team had achieved a best finish of fourth place, one position away from promotion to the Second Division, a feat achieved in both the 1978–79 and 1984–85 seasons. In the 1986–87 season, Gillingham had finished fifth, qualifying for the newly introduced play-offs for the third promotion place, but lost to Swindon Town in the final. The two teams drew 2–2 on aggregate, necessitating a replay at a neutral venue, which Swindon won 2–0 to ensure that Gillingham would again be playing in the Third Division the following season.

Keith Peacock was the club's manager for a seventh season, having been appointed in July 1981. Paul Taylor continued in the role of assistant manager, having been appointed at the same time as Peacock. Bill Collins, who had been with the club in a variety of roles since the early 1960s, held the post of first-team trainer, and John Gorman managed the youth team. Mark Weatherly was club captain, but for much of the early part of the season he was unable to play following an operation and subsequent injuries, so Colin Greenall served as captain on the field of play in his absence.

Following Gillingham's failure to win promotion, Tony Cascarino, the previous season's top goalscorer, joined Millwall of the Second Division for a transfer fee of £225,000. This was at the time the highest fee which Gillingham had ever received for a player. Despite having lost the highest-scoring player of the previous season, the club did not immediately sign any new forwards; the only two players to join the club ahead of the new season were George Shipley, a midfielder signed from Charlton Athletic for £40,000, and Gary West, a defender who arrived from Lincoln City for £50,000. The Gillingham team prepared for the new season with several friendly matches and the club also staged an open day, when supporters could attend autograph sessions with players and watch them training. The club's first-choice kit featured shirts in the club's traditional blue with a white zigzag band across the chest; the away shirts, to be worn in the event of a clash of colours with the home team, were the reverse of this. At the start of the season, Gillingham were anticipating playing at Wembley Stadium, England's national stadium, for the first time in the club's history, as all 92 League teams were originally set to play there in April 1988 in the Football League Centenary Tournament. The format of the tournament was later significantly changed, however, such that only 16 teams would compete. Gillingham failed to qualify for the revised tournament and did not make their first appearance at Wembley until 1999.

== Third Division ==
=== August–December ===
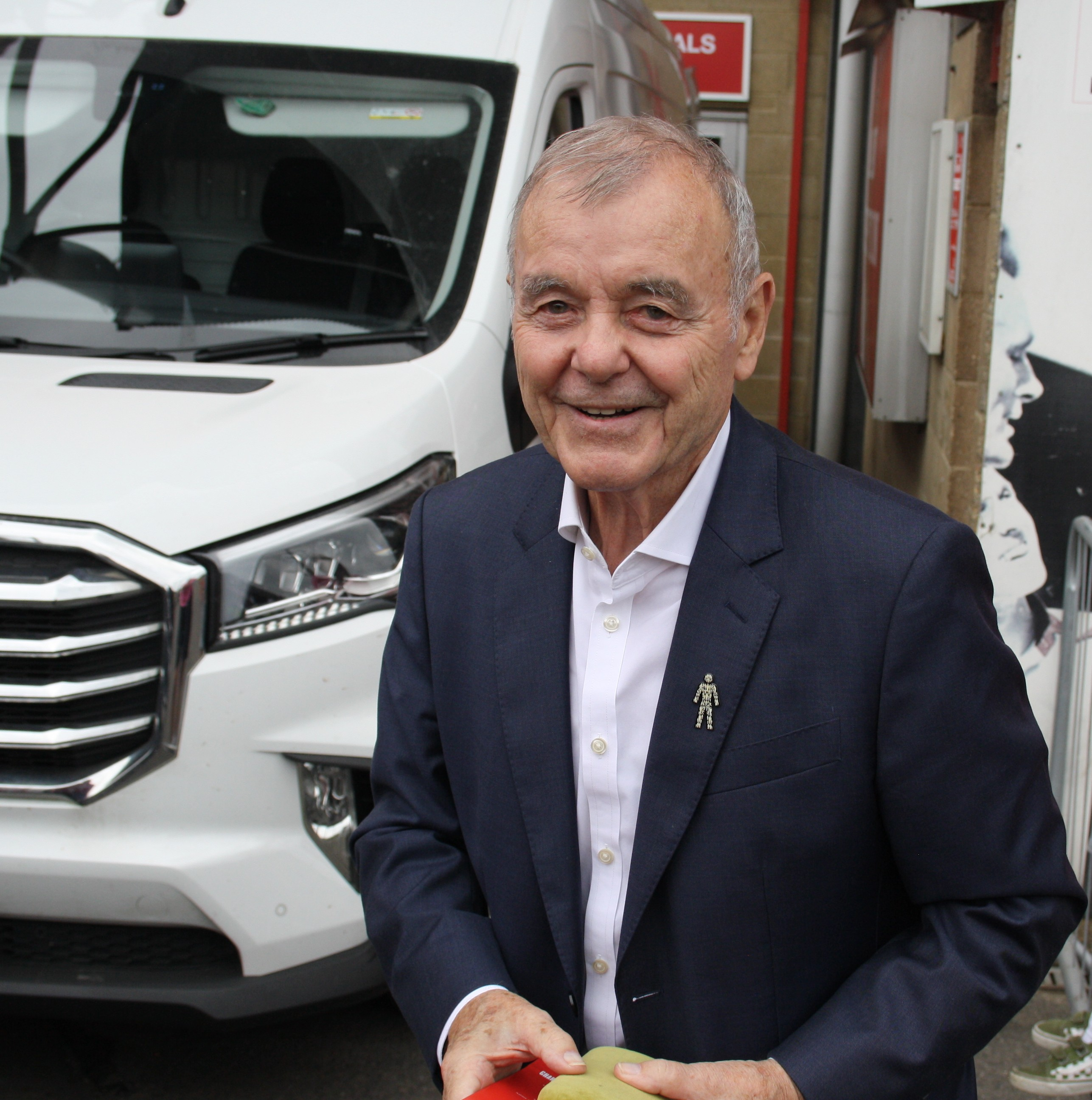
Keith Peacock (pictured in 2025) was dismissed from his role as the club's manager in December.

Gillingham's first match of the season was at home to Blackpool and resulted in a 0–0 draw. After a second consecutive league match in which the team failed to score a goal, a 2–0 defeat away to Grimsby Town, Gillingham defeated Southend United 8–1 on 29 August, the most goals scored by Gillingham in a single match in the Football League since a 9–4 victory over Exeter City in 1951. Forward Steve Lovell scored four times, the first time a Gillingham player had scored as many goals in a league game since 1958. Seven days later, Gillingham played Chesterfield, who were joint top of the league table going into the game and had the best defensive record in the division, having not conceded any goals in the first four matches of the season. Gillingham won the game 10–0, setting a new record for the club's biggest win in the Football League; four players each scored two goals but on this occasion Lovell did not score at all. The win was the largest by any team in the Football League since 1964; it was the 61st game in Football League history in which a team scored double figures, but the first such game in which no player scored more than twice.

Victory over York City on 19 September left Gillingham second in the table, but one draw and two defeats in the next three games meant that the team dropped to twelfth. New signing Shipley was seriously injured against York and did not play again for nearly six months. In early October, the club signed forward Mark Cooper from Tottenham Hotspur for a fee of £102,500, setting a new record for the highest fee Gillingham had paid to sign a player. He went straight into the starting line-up for the home game against Bristol Rovers on 10 October and scored his first goal two games later in a 1–1 draw with Preston North End. Gavin Peacock, son of the manager, also made his debut against Bristol Rovers, having joined the club on a one-month loan from Queens Park Rangers. An unbeaten run of five games pushed Gillingham back up among the teams contending for a play-off place; the team ended the month of October in seventh position, two places behind the lowest position which would qualify for the play-offs.

The team's unbeaten run ended with a 1–0 defeat at home to Brentford on 3 November and the rest of the month's matches resulted in two draws and another defeat, after which Gillingham had once again fallen to 12th place in the league table. During November, the club signed Bobby Hutchinson from Walsall on loan, but he suffered an injury less than 10 minutes into his first training session and the loan was curtailed. In early December, Gavin Peacock rejoined the club, this time on a permanent basis for a fee of £40,000. The team defeated Rotherham United 2–1 on 12 December, but then lost to Walsall. Gillingham's last match of 1987 was away to Aldershot and resulted in a 6–0 defeat, the most goals conceded by Gillingham in a match for more than three years. The team had now won only one of the last eight games and had slipped into the bottom half of the league table. The following day, manager Peacock was dismissed from his job by the club's board of directors. Assistant manager Taylor was appointed to the manager's role for the remainder of the season.

=== January–May ===
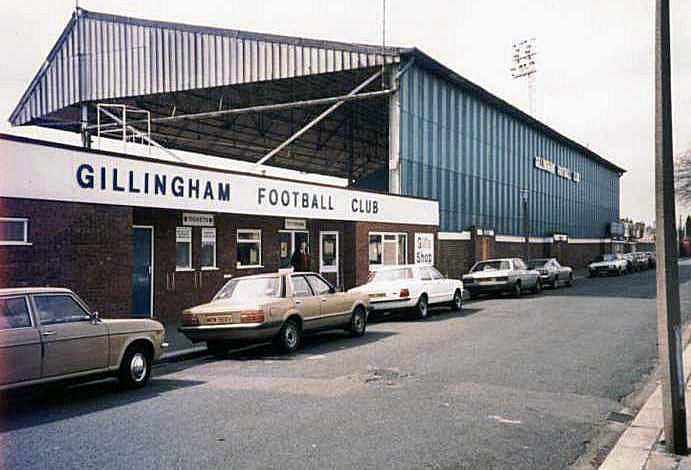
Gillingham's home ground, Priestfield Stadium (pictured c. 1987)

The team's first match under new manager Taylor was away to Southend United on 1 January 1988 and resulted in a 3–1 win for Gillingham; veteran goalkeeper Ron Hillyard, who was in his 14th season with the club but had been kept out of the team by Phil Kite before Christmas, was recalled to the team. The first home game since the change of manager took place the following day and ended in a 2–2 draw with Fulham. The home fans staged a protest against the dismissal of Peacock, who was in attendance at the game; after the match some supporters caught up with the former manager in the car park and carried him on their shoulders down the road outside the stadium. Afterwards Peacock told the press "There was no way I could have stopped the fans doing what they did. Everything was very orderly and non-violent and I considered it merely the supporters' way of saying thank you for what I have done at Gillingham." The team ended the month of January with consecutive defeats to Wigan Athletic and Sunderland.

Gillingham were unbeaten in five matches played in February, winning three and drawing two, which took the team back up to eighth in the table. During this run, Greenall was transferred to Oxford United for a new club-record fee of £285,000. Lovell scored a total of eight goals in the five matches, including his second hat-trick of the season in a 4–1 win over Chesterfield. Gillingham scored only a single goal in the next four games, which resulted in two draws and two defeats. Shipley made his return to the team in the defeat away to Chester City, having not played since the previous September. On 26 March, Gillingham ended their run of winless games by defeating league leaders Notts County away from home. Defender Alan Walker, a new signing from Millwall, made his debut in that match, after which Gillingham were ninth in the table.

Over the Easter weekend, Gillingham lost to both promotion-chasing Brighton & Hove Albion and Northampton Town. In the next game away to Brentford, Gillingham took the lead eight minutes from the end of the game but then conceded a late equaliser; the draw left them 11th in the table. The team next defeated Preston 4–0, their biggest victory since September, but the attendance of 2,721 was the lowest of the season for a league game at Priestfield. Gillingham then lost consecutive matches to Bury and Rotherham. The final match of the season was away to third-placed Walsall, and finished as a 0–0 draw; the team had only won two of the last twelve games of the season and finished in 13th place in the Third Division, the same position as when Keith Peacock was dismissed in December.

=== Match details ===
Key

- In result column, Gillingham's score shown first
- H = Home match
- A = Away match
- pen. = Penalty kick
- o.g. = Own goal

Results

Date	Opponents	Result	Goalscorers	Attendance
15 August 1987	Blackpool (H)	0–0		4,430
22 August 1987	Grimsby Town (A)	0–2		2,901
29 August 1987	Southend United (H)	8–1	Lovell (4), Shearer, Smith (2), Pritchard	4,154
31 August 1987	Wigan Athletic (A)	1–1	Shearer	3,412
5 September 1987	Chesterfield (H)	10–0	Pritchard (2), Shearer (2), Shipley (2), Elsey (2), Smith, Greenall	4,099
12 September 1987	Fulham (A)	2–0	Lovell, Shearer	7,404
15 September 1987	Sunderland (H)	0–0		9,184
19 September 1987	York City (H)	3–1	Elsey (2), West	5,507
26 September 1987	Bristol City (A)	3–3	Lovell, Smith, Elsey	10,070
29 September 1987	Chester City (H)	0–1		5,193
3 October 1987	Doncaster Rovers (A)	2–4	Lovell, Eves	1,647
10 October 1987	Bristol Rovers (H)	3–0	Smith, Lovell, Pritchard	4,399
17 October 1987	Mansfield Town (A)	2–2	Lovell, Quow (pen.)	2,957
20 October 1987	Preston North End (A)	1–1	Cooper	5,676
24 October 1987	Notts County (H)	3–1	Lovell (2), Cooper	5,551
31 October 1987	Port Vale (A)	0–0		3,495
3 November 1987	Brentford (H)	0–1		4,529
7 November 1987	Brighton & Hove Albion (H)	1–1	Greenall (pen.)	6,437
21 November 1987	Northampton Town (A)	1–2	Lovell	5,151
28 November 1987	Bury (H)	3–3	West, Eves (2)	3,984
12 December 1987	Rotherham United (A)	2–1	Pritchard, Eves	2,557
18 December 1987	Walsall (H)	0–1		4,020
26 December 1987	Bristol City (H)	1–1	Smith	6,457
28 December 1987	Aldershot (A)	0–6		4,734
1 January 1988	Southend United (A)	3–1	Peacock, Cooper, Lovell	5,254
2 January 1988	Fulham (H)	2–2	Cooper (2)	6,001
16 January 1988	York City (A)	2–0	Lovell, Pritchard	2,129
23 January 1988	Wigan Athletic (H)	0–1		4,256
30 January 1988	Sunderland (A)	1–2	Cooper	16,195
2 February 1988	Grimsby Town (H)	1–1	Cooper	2,995
6 February 1988	Chesterfield (A)	4–1	Hunter (o.g.), Lovell (3)	2,141
13 February 1988	Aldershot (H)	2–1	Lovell (pen.), Gernon	4,001
20 February 1988	Blackpool (A)	3–3	Lovell (2), Elsey	3,405
27 February 1988	Doncaster Rovers (H)	3–1	Lovell (2, 1 pen.), Cooper	4,041
2 March 1988	Chester City (A)	1–3	Pritchard	1,638
5 March 1988	Mansfield Town (H)	0–0		3,720
12 March 1988	Bristol Rovers (A)	0–2		3,846
19 March 1988	Port Vale (H)	0–0		3,459
26 March 1988	Notts County (A)	1–0	Lovell	6,473
2 April 1988	Brighton & Hove Albion (A)	0–2		9,256
4 April 1988	Northampton Town (H)	1–2	Lovell	4,126
9 April 1988	Brentford (A)	2–2	Peacock, Eves	3,875
23 April 1988	Preston North End (H)	4–0	Lovell, Eves (2), Smith	2,721
30 April 1988	Bury (A)	1–2	Pritchard	1,433
2 May 1988	Rotherham United (H)	0–2		3,015
7 May 1988	Walsall (A)	0–0		8,850

=== Partial league table ===
Football League Third Division final table, positions 10–16
Pos	Team	Pld	W	D	L	GF	GA	GD	Pts
10	Blackpool	46	17	14	15	71	62	+9	65
11	Port Vale	46	18	11	17	58	56	+2	65
12	Brentford	46	16	14	16	53	59	−6	62
13	Gillingham	46	14	17	15	77	61	+16	59
14	Bury	46	15	14	17	58	57	+1	59
15	Chester City	46	14	16	16	51	62	−11	58
16	Preston North End	46	15	13	18	48	59	−11	58

== Cup matches ==
=== FA Cup ===
As a Third Division team, Gillingham entered the 1987–88 FA Cup in the first round and were drawn to play fellow Third Division team Fulham; Gillingham won 1–0 with a goal from Greenall. In the second round they played another Third Division team, Walsall, whom they defeated 2–1. The First and Second Division teams entered the competition in the third round and Gillingham were drawn to play Birmingham City of the Second Division. Greenall scored an own goal after three minutes and Birmingham added two more goals to win 3–0 and end Gillingham's participation in the FA Cup. Further protests against Peacock's dismissal occurred at the Birmingham game.

==== Match details ====
Key

- In result column, Gillingham's score shown first
- H = Home match
- A = Away match
- pen. = Penalty kick
- o.g. = Own goal

Results

Date	Round	Opponents	Result	Goalscorers	Attendance
14 November 1987	First	Fulham (H)	1–0	Greenall	6,444
5 December 1987	Second	Walsall (H)	2–1	Lovell, Elsey	4,916
9 January 1988	Third	Birmingham City (H)	0–3		9,267

=== Football League Cup ===
As a Third Division team, Gillingham entered the 1987–88 Football League Cup in the first round and were drawn to play fellow Third Division team Brighton. In the first match of the two-legged tie, Gillingham won 1–0 with a goal from Greenall. In the second leg, Chris Hutchings scored for Brighton midway through the first half to level the aggregate score. Shortly afterwards, Gillingham goalkeeper Kite was sent off for fouling an opposition player, reducing his team to ten men. As no substitute goalkeeper was available, defender Paul Haylock volunteered to take over in goal. With his team-mates adopting a defensive strategy, Haylock conceded no goals during the remainder of the game; with the scores still level, a penalty shoot-out was required. Both teams scored with their first four penalties; Gillingham scored their fifth and then Haylock saved Brighton's fifth kick to give Gillingham the victory. In the second round, Gillingham played Stoke City of the Second Division, who won the first leg 2–0 and the second 1–0 to eliminate Gillingham from the competition.

==== Match details ====
Key

- In result column, Gillingham's score shown first
- H = Home match
- A = Away match
- pen. = Penalty kick
- o.g. = Own goal

Results

Date	Round	Opponents	Result	Goalscorers	Attendance
18 August 1987	First (first leg)	Brighton & Hove Albion (H)	1–0	Greenall	4,162
26 August 1987	First (second leg)	Brighton & Hove Albion (A)	0–1		5,479
22 September 1987	Second (first leg)	Stoke City (A)	0–2		7,198
6 October 1987	Second (second leg)	Stoke City (H)	0–1		5,039

=== Associate Members' Cup ===
The 1987–88 Associate Members' Cup, a tournament exclusively for Third and Fourth Division teams, began with a preliminary round in which the teams were drawn into groups of three, contested on a round-robin basis. Gillingham's group also contained Aldershot of the Third Division and Leyton Orient of the Fourth. Gillingham lost 3–1 to Aldershot in their first match and drew 2–2 with Leyton Orient in the second and finished bottom of the group, which meant that they failed to qualify for the next round.

==== Match details ====
Key

- In result column, Gillingham's score shown first
- H = Home match
- A = Away match
- pen. = Penalty kick
- o.g. = Own goal

Results

Date	Round	Opponents	Result	Goalscorers	Attendance
13 October 1987	Preliminary (southern section)	Aldershot	1–3	Lovell	1,810
27 October 1987	Preliminary (southern section)	Leyton Orient	2–2	Greenall (2, 1 pen.)	2,558

== Players ==
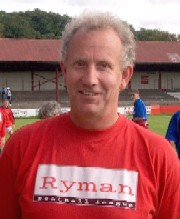
Veteran Ron Hillyard (pictured in 2001) was one of three goalkeepers who played for the team during the season.

Lovell made the highest number of appearances during the season; he was in the starting line-up for every one of the club's 55 matches. Pritchard and West also made over 50 appearances, each playing 51 times. Both players played in every game in the FA Cup, League Cup, and Associate Members' Cup, but each missed four Third Division matches. Four other players made more than 40 appearances. Four players, all members of the club's youth team, played only one game each. Of these, Ian Docker, Ivan Haines and Lee Palmer would all go on to become regulars in the first team, but Neil Luff's single appearance as a substitute would prove to be the only game of his professional career.

Lovell was also the team's top goalscorer, with 25 goals in the Third Division and a total of 27 in all competitions, three times as many as any other player. It was the first of four consecutive seasons in which he would be Gillingham's top scorer. He was the season's overall top scorer in Third Division matches; Southend's David Crown finished the season with 26 league goals, but this included 9 scored in the Fourth Division for Cambridge United before he was transferred in November.

Player statistics
Player	Position	Third Division		FA Cup		League Cup		Associate Members' Cup		Total	
Player	Position	Apps	Goals	Apps	Goals	Apps	Goals	Apps	Goals	Apps	Goals
Les Berry	DF	20	0	0	0	1	0	2	0	23	0
Mark Cooper	FW	31	8	2	0	0	0	2	0	35	8
Ian Docker	MF	1	0	0	0	0	0	0	0	1	0
Karl Elsey	MF	39	6	3	1	4	0	1	0	47	7
Mel Eves	FW	15	7	2	0	3	0	0	0	20	7
Irvin Gernon	DF	21	1	1	0	2	0	0	0	24	1
Colin Greenall	DF	25	2	3	0	3	1	1	2	32	5
Ivan Haines	DF	1	0	0	0	0	0	0	0	1	0
Paul Haylock	DF	32	0	3	0	4	0	2	0	41	0
Ron Hillyard	GK	18	0	1	0	0	0	0	0	19	0
Phil Kite	GK	26	0	2	0	4	0	2	0	34	0
Jason Lillis	FW	7	0	1	1	1	0	2	0	11	1
Steve Lovell	FW	46	25	3	1	4	0	2	1	55	27
Neil Luff	MF	1	0	0	0	0	0	0	0	1	0
Lee Palmer	DF	1	0	0	0	0	0	0	0	1	0
Tony Parks	GK	2	0	0	0	0	0	0	0	2	0
Gavin Peacock	MF	26	2	1	0	0	0	2	0	29	2
Graham Pearce	DF	32	0	2	0	2	0	2	0	38	0
Howard Pritchard	FW	42	8	3	1	4	0	2	0	51	9
Trevor Quow	MF	40	1	2	0	3	0	1	0	46	1
Dave Shearer	FW	11	5	0	0	4	0	0	0	15	5
George Shipley	MF	15	2	0	0	2	0	0	0	17	2
Dave Smith	FW	35	7	1	0	4	0	2	0	42	7
Malcolm Smith	MF	2	1	1	0	0	0	0	0	3	1
Alan Walker	DF	7	0	0	0	0	0	0	0	7	0
Mark Weatherly	DF	17	0	2	0	0	0	0	0	19	0
Gary West	DF	42	2	3	0	4	0	2	0	51	2

FW = Forward, MF = Midfielder, GK = Goalkeeper, DF = Defender

== Aftermath ==
Taylor remained manager of Gillingham for the start of the 1988–89 season, but was dismissed in October 1988, after only ten months in the job, following a run of poor results. Gillingham finished 23rd in the Third Division and were relegated to the fourth tier of English football, where they would remain for seven seasons. Peacock returned to management in the summer of 1989 when he was appointed by Maidstone United after they were promoted into the Fourth Division to become Kent's second Football League club. He remained a popular figure with Gillingham supporters, referred to as "Sir Keith". Speaking in 2004, he attributed his dismissal in part to the inexperience of the club's directors, saying "A new board had taken over and they were a little bit green. They got carried away by the play-off final and 18 goals in two weekends, thinking we would steamroller the league. I'm proud of my time with the club, though."
