= Peter Beadle =

English footballer and manager

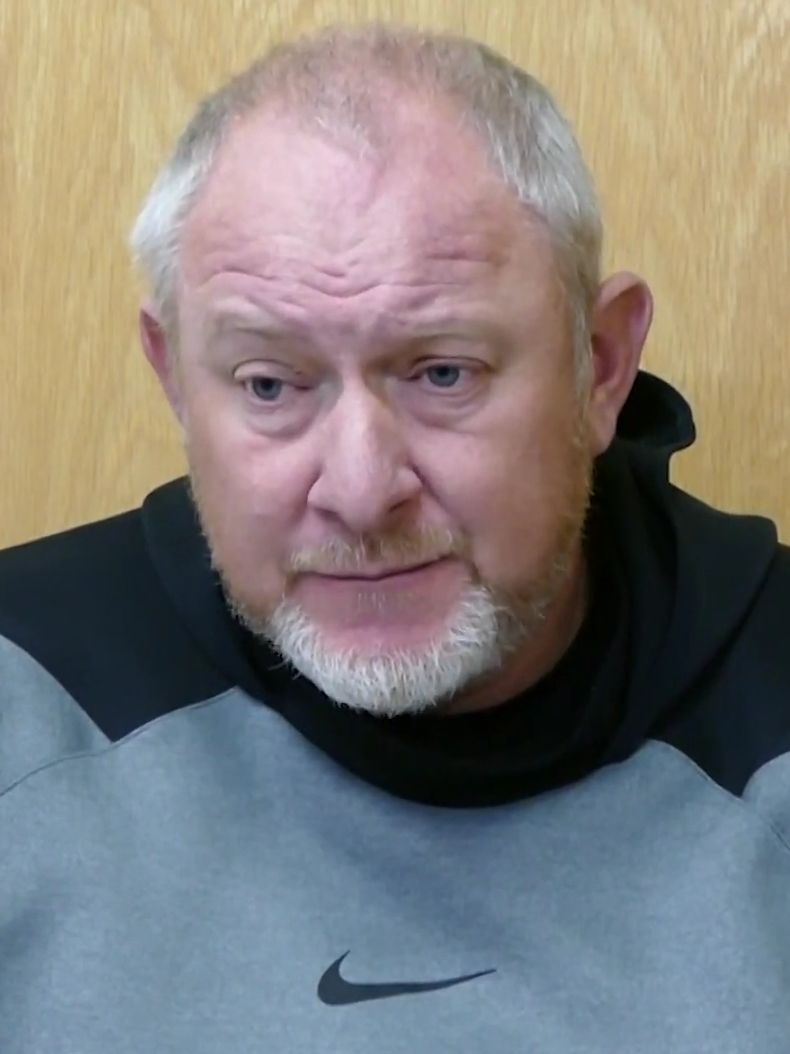
- Beadle in 2020

Personal information
- Full name: Peter Clifford William James Beadle
- Date of birth: 13 May 1972 (age 54)
- Place of birth: Lambeth, England
- Height: 6 ft 1 in (1.85 m)
- Position: Forward

Youth career
- 1986–1989: Gillingham

Senior career*
Years	Team	Apps	(Gls)
1989–1992	Gillingham	67	(14)
1990	→ Margate (loan)	1	(0)
1992–1994	Tottenham Hotspur	0	(0)
1993	→ AFC Bournemouth (loan)	9	(2)
1994	→ Southend United (loan)	8	(1)
1994–1995	Watford	23	(1)
1995–1998	Bristol Rovers	109	(39)
1998–1999	Port Vale	23	(6)
1999	Notts County	22	(3)
1999–2003	Bristol City	82	(14)
2003	Brentford	1	(0)
2003	Barnet	13	(3)
2003–2004	Team Bath		
2004–2005	Clevedon Town		
Total		358	(83)

Managerial career
- 2005: Taunton Town
- 2005–2008: Newport County
- 2010: Clevedon Town
- 2014: Hereford United (caretaker)
- 2015–2018: Hereford
- 2020: Barnet
- 2022: Yate Town
- 2025–2026: Shortwood United
- * Club domestic league appearances and goals

Peter Clifford William James Beadle (born 13 May 1972) is an English football manager and former player.

A former player, Beadle played as a forward, and he scored some 83 goals in 355 league games, mostly for the two Bristol clubs. He started his career at Gillingham in 1989 and won a £300,000 move to Tottenham Hotspur two years later; he never made a first-team appearance for Spurs, however, and was loaned out to AFC Bournemouth and Southend United, before he was transferred to Watford in September 1994. He moved on to Bristol Rovers a year later and, after 39 goals in 109 league games with the club, he was signed by Port Vale for £300,000 in August 1998. He was sold to Notts County in February 1999 for £250,000 before moving to Bristol City for £200,000 seven months later. He spent four years with the club, as City reached the Football League Trophy final twice, losing in 2000 and winning in 2003. He retired after brief spells with Brentford, Barnet, Team Bath and Clevedon Town.

He entered management with Newport County in October 2005. He kept the club in the Conference South and led the club to the FAW Premier Cup final in 2007 and 2008, losing in 2007 and 2008; however, he was sacked in April 2008, after his team narrowly missed out on the play-offs for a second successive season. He then spent a brief spell in charge at Clevedon Town in 2010, and since then specialised in training roles with younger players and was appointed director of youth football at Hereford United in April 2013. He was named caretaker manager at Hereford in March 2014 following the departure of Martin Foyle as first-team boss. In April 2015, he was named the first manager of new club Hereford. He led the club to the Midland Football League title in 2015–16, as well as the Midland Football League Cup and Herefordshire County Cup, and the FA Vase final. He then led Hereford to successive Southern League Division One South & West and Premier Division titles in the 2016–17 and 2017–18 seasons, before being sacked in September 2018. He returned to management at Barnet in August 2020, though he left the club four months later. He returned to management with Yate Town for a brief spell from May to October 2022. He took charge at Shortwood United in September 2025.

== Playing career ==
=== Gillingham ===
A striker, he made his debut at Fourth Division club Gillingham at the age of 16, against Cardiff City at Priestfield Stadium on 11 March 1989. He joined Southern League Southern Division side Margate on loan and made his debut for the "Gate" on 31 March 1990, in a 2–1 defeat to Dunstable at Hartsdown Park. The loan was expected to last until the end of the 1989–90 season, however, he was recalled to Gillingham in early April and turned professional at the club the following month. He made 76 appearances in all competitions for Gillingham, scoring 15 goals, as Damien Richardson's "Gills" struggled in mid-table in 1990–91 and 1991–92.

=== Spurs to Watford ===
His promise earned him a move to Premier League side Tottenham Hotspur in June 1992, who spent £300,000 to secure his services, a club record for Gillingham. He had supported the club as a boy. He was loaned out to Tony Pulis' Second Division side AFC Bournemouth at the end of the 1992–93 season, where he scored twice in nine games. At the end of 1993–94, he joined First Division club Southend United on loan, scoring once in eight appearances for Peter Taylor's side. He never made it onto the pitch for a competitive game at White Hart Lane. In September 1994, he was allowed to join Glenn Roeder's Watford for £5,000 plus a 20% sell-on fee. This move was not a success, as proven by his record of just one goal in 24 league and cup appearances. After missing out on the First Division play-offs in 1994–95, Watford were relegated at the end of 1995–96.

=== Bristol Rovers ===
Beadle escaped Watford before the club were relegated, having signed for Bristol Rovers in November 1995, manager John Ward paying a £30,000 fee. Rovers missed out on the play-offs by just three points in 1995–96. Rovers struggled in 1996–97 under rookie manager Ian Holloway. Beadle was the club's top scorer with 12 goals in 43 games, hitting a hat-trick past Bury at the Memorial Stadium. He hit 15 league goals in 1997–98, and his new strike partner Barry Hayles was the division's leading scorer with 23 strikes. Thanks to Beadle and Hayles, Rovers outscored the rest of the clubs in the division. However, a leaky defence cost them an automatic promotion place and an aggregate 4–3 defeat to Northampton Town at the play-off semi-final stage lost them the chance of second-tier football. He scored two hat-tricks throughout the campaign, the first coming in a 5–3 thriller at home to former club Bournemouth and the second coming in a 5–0 demolition of Wigan Athletic.

=== Port Vale to Notts County ===
Beadle joined John Rudge's First Division Port Vale for £300,000 in August 1998. He scored six goals in 26 games, but new manager Brian Horton sold him on to Sam Allardyce's Second Division Notts County for £250,000 in February 1999. In total he scored nine goals in forty games in 1998–99 for both clubs. After ten appearances in 1999–2000, he was sold to league rivals Bristol City for £200,000 in September 1999.

=== Bristol City ===
The move to Bristol City reunited him with former boss Tony Pulis. Beadle scored ten goals in 34 games for City in 1999–2000, helping the club to reach the Football League Trophy final at Wembley by scoring in both legs of the semi-final against Exeter City. However, the "Robins" lost 2–1 to Stoke City in the final. He finished the 2000–01 season with just five goals in forty games, as the "Reds" finished a disappointing ninth. In September 2001, Luton Town manager Joe Kinnear was rumoured to be considering a move for the striker, who was on the sidelines recovering from a knee injury. However, Beadle underwent an operation on his knee the next month, following advice from his surgeon. The injury kept him out of action for the entirety of the 2001–02 campaign.

In September 2002, Beadle was told he could leave the club on loan. Colchester United manager Steve Whitton confirmed he was interested in signing the striker, but no deal was made. City reached Football League Trophy for a second time in three years at the end of the season. They tasted victory at the Millennium Stadium, beating Carlisle United 2–0 with goals from Peacock and Rosenior; Beadle was an unused substitute. He posted 32 appearances in 2002–03, scoring four goals. Beadle was released by the club in July 2003, with the manager Danny Wilson looking to cut his wage bill to make new signings. He then went on trial at Cheltenham Town, but was not offered a contract.

=== Later career ===
Beadle signed a one-month contract with Wally Downes' Brentford in September 2003, only to be sent off twelve minutes into his debut against Tranmere Rovers. Due to his subsequent suspension and an ankle injury he never played for the club again and instead switched to Barnet of the Conference. He scored on his "Bees" debut in a win at Stevenage, he played for free and impressed enough to win a short-term contract out of manager Martin Allen. He scored five goals in 15 games in 2003–04, before joining non-League side Team Bath as a player-coach in December 2003. In June 2004 he moved from Bath to become player-commercial manager at Clevedon Town.

== Management career ==
=== Taunton Town ===
He worked as manager at Taunton Town from June 2005 to October 2005.

=== Newport County ===
In October 2005, Beadle replaced John Cornforth as manager of Conference South side Newport County. His new club were on a run of seven successive defeats in the league, and following defeats in his first three games in charge, Beadle managed to turn the club around slowly. One of his first signings as manager was controversial striker Craig Hughes who had previously served a prison sentence for football hooliganism whilst on Cardiff City's books. By the end of the 2005–06 campaign his team went on a run of six wins in eight games, and avoided relegation by a four-point margin.

In the 2006–07 season, Newport progressed through the FA Cup qualifying rounds to face Swansea City in the FA Cup first round. 15 minutes into the match Beadle was sent off by referee Anthony Bates after Beadle disputed a free kick awarded to Swansea. As he left the field, Beadle confronted the fourth official, and a member of the crowd wounded the official by throwing a coin. In a post-match interview Beadle claimed not to have witnessed the attack and defended his 'passionate' approach to the game, claiming he did not deserve to be sent from the field for his outburst. Newport were subsequently fined a total of £3,000 after being found guilty of failing to control both their manager and their crowd. Beadle received a seven-match touchline ban after accepting misconduct charges, and was fined £1,500, half of which was suspended subject to good behaviour. He also apologised, saying, "I let not only myself and my family but my football club down."

County went on to finish 2006–07 in sixth place, missing out on the play-offs following a final day defeat at home to Cambridge City – had they won the game they would have qualified for the play-offs. They did though the reach the final of the FAW Premier Cup, where they lost 1–0 to The New Saints. During the campaign Beadle signed three veteran players: Dean Holdsworth (who would later replace him as manager), Darren Garner, and Nathan Blake. The 2007–08 season saw the last instalment of the FAW Premier Cup, and Beadle led his club to the final with shock wins over the two Welsh giants: Swansea City and Cardiff City. A 1–0 win over Llanelli in the final meant that Newport got to keep the trophy and the £100,000 prize money. However, Newport finished ninth in the league in 2007–08, once again a final day defeat at Newport Stadium cost them a place in the play-offs. Had they beaten Fisher Athletic then they would have finished fifth, and would have guaranteed themselves a play-off spot. This disappointment cost Beadle his job, as the day after the defeat, 27 April, he was sacked . He was succeeded by Dean Holdsworth in May 2008.

=== Clevedon Town ===
In March 2010 Beadle was appointed manager of Clevedon Town. He vacated the position in the summer after failing to prevent their relegation from the Southern League Premier Division. He later worked at West Bromwich Albion's development centre, before he was recruited into Cheltenham Town's Centre of Excellence by John Brough.

=== Hereford ===
In April 2013, Beadle was appointed director of youth football at Hereford United. On 20 March 2014 Beadle was named caretaker manager following the departure of Martin Foyle. The "Bulls" ended the 2013–14 season in 20th place, finishing above the relegation zone on goal difference after beating Aldershot Town 2–1 at the Recreation Ground on the final day of the season. After this success he was invited to apply for the position permanently, but was never interviewed. In May 2014, Beadle was appointed head coach at Sutton United by manager Paul Doswell.

In April 2015, he was appointed as the first ever manager of Hereford, the successor club to Hereford United. He won a treble in his first season as manager, 2015–16, as Hereford won the Midland League, Midland League Cup, and Herefordshire County Cup. He also took Hereford to the 2016 FA Vase final at Wembley Stadium, where they lost 4–1 to Morpeth Town. He achieved a second-successive promotion in 2016–17 after leading Hereford to the Southern League Division One South & West title with six games to spare. After winning 36 of their 46 Southern League Premier Division games during the 2017–18 season, Hereford again won promotion with a third consecutive promotion. He was sacked on 13 September 2018, with the club lying 12th in National League North after eight games.

=== Barnet ===
On 22 August 2020, he was appointed as manager of Barnet, who had ended the 2019–20 campaign seventh in the National League. Chairman Anthony Kleanthous said that he selected Beadle over more than 100 other candidates and that he would have to work with a "leaner" squad. Beadle left the post on 13 December 2020, the day after a 6–0 defeat by Chesterfield left the "Bees" winless in nine games and just one point above the relegation zone.

=== Yate Town ===
On 8 May 2022, Beadle was appointed manager of Yate Town, who had finished seventh in the Southern League Premier Division. On 23 October 2022, Beadle resigned despite receiving a vote of confidence from the board of directors after completely rebuilding the playing squad in the summer.

=== Shortwood United ===
On 30 September 2025, Beadle was appointed as manager of Hellenic League club Shortwood United, who had won just one of their opening nine games of the 2025–26 season. On 22 July 2026, Beadle was sacked as manager after a "mass exodus of players" despite having guided the team to a mid-table finish.

== Personal life ==
He married Clare. In 2017, he was married to Maz. He has five children: Matt, Connor, Josh, Joe, and Poppy. Matt had a career in non-League football.

== Career statistics ==
=== Playing statistics ===
Appearances and goals by club, season and competition
Club	Season	League			FA Cup		Other		Total	
Club	Season	Division	Apps	Goals	Apps	Goals	Apps	Goals	Apps	Goals
Gillingham	1988–89	Third Division	2	0	0	0	0	0	2	0
Gillingham	1989–90	Fourth Division	10	2	0	0	2	0	12	2
Gillingham	1990–91	Fourth Division	22	7	0	0	3	0	25	7
Gillingham	1991–92	Fourth Division	33	5	2	0	4	2	39	7
Gillingham	Total		67	14	2	0	9	2	78	16
Margate (loan)	1989–90	Southern League; Southern Division	1	0	0	0	0	0	1	0
Tottenham Hotspur	1992–93	Premier League	0	0	0	0	0	0	0	0
Tottenham Hotspur	1993–94	Premier League	0	0	0	0	0	0	0	0
Tottenham Hotspur	Total		0	0	0	0	0	0	0	0
AFC Bournemouth (loan)	1992–93	Second Division	9	2	0	0	0	0	9	2
Southend United (loan)	1993–94	First Division	8	1	0	0	0	0	8	1
Watford	1994–95	First Division	20	1	0	0	0	0	20	1
Watford	1995–96	First Division	3	0	0	0	1	0	4	0
Watford	Total		23	1	0	0	1	0	24	1
Bristol Rovers	1995–96	Second Division	27	12	0	0	3	0	30	12
Bristol Rovers	1996–97	Second Division	42	12	1	0	1	0	44	12
Bristol Rovers	1997–98	Second Division	40	15	4	2	7	1	51	18
Bristol Rovers	Total		109	39	5	2	11	1	125	42
Port Vale	1998–99	First Division	23	6	1	0	2	0	26	6
Notts County	1998–99	Second Division	14	3	0	0	0	0	14	3
Notts County	1999–2000	Second Division	8	0	0	0	4	0	12	0
Notts County	Total		22	3	0	0	4	0	26	3
Bristol City	1999–2000	Second Division	25	6	3	0	6	4	34	10
Bristol City	2000–01	Second Division	33	4	5	1	2	0	40	5
Bristol City	2001–02	Second Division	24	4	2	0	6	0	32	4
Bristol City	Total		82	14	10	1	14	4	106	19
Brentford	2003–04	Second Division	1	0	0	0	0	0	1	0
Barnet	2003–04	Conference National	13	3	2	2	0	0	15	5
Career total			358	83	20	5	41	7	419	95

=== Managerial statistics ===
As of match played 12 December 2020

Managerial record by team and tenure
Team	From	To	Record					Ref
Team	From	To	P	W	D	L	Win %	Ref
Hereford United (caretaker); Hereford	20 March 2014; 17 April 2015	23 May 2014; 13 September 2018	146	110	18	18	75.3	
Barnet	22 August 2020	13 December 2020	16	4	3	9	25.0	

== Honours ==
=== As a player ===
Bristol City

- Football League Trophy: 2002–03; runner-up: 1999–2000

=== As a manager ===
Newport County

- FAW Premier Cup: 2007–08; runner-up: 2006–07

Hereford

- Southern League Division One South & West Premier Division: 2017–18
- Southern League Division One South & West Division One South & West: 2016–17
- Midland League: 2015–16
- Midland League Cup: 2016
- Herefordshire County Cup: 2016
- FA Vase runner-up: 2015–16
