= 2007–08 FAW Premier Cup =

Tournament details
- Country: England; Wales
- Teams: 16

Final positions
- Champions: Newport County
- Runners-up: Llanelli

Tournament statistics
- Matches played: 15
- Goals scored: 45 (3 per match)

The 2007–08 FAW Premier Cup was the 11th season of the tournament since its founding in 1997. Newport County were the eventual winners, beating Llanelli 1–0 in the final to win the competition for the first time in the club's history.

To date, the season remains the last time the tournament was played after the BBC withdrew sponsorship in 2008.

== Calendar ==
Round	Main date	Number of fixtures	Clubs	Prize money
First	2 October 2007	4	8	£5,000
Second	6 November 2007	4	8	£7,500
Quarter-finals	8 January 2008; 9 January 2008	4	8	£15,000
Semi-finals	19 February 2008; 26 February 2008	2	4	£25,000
Final	11 March 2008	1	2	Winners: £100,000; Losers: £50,000

== First round ==
2 October 2007
19:00

Connah's Quay Nomads	1–1 (a.e.t.)	Carmarthen Town
White 69'		Palmer 59'
Penalties
	2–3

Deeside Stadium, Connah's Quay
Attendance: 127
Referee: Kevin Parry

2 October 2007
19:00

Porthmadog	2–7	Port Talbot Town
Owen 84'; Roberts 86'		McCreesh 7'; Rose 19', 39'; Morgan 64', 73', 89'; Bond 76'

Y Traeth, Porthmadog
Attendance: 136
Referee: Ceri Richards

2 October 2007
19:00

Haverfordwest County	3–1	Airbus UK Broughton
Woodrow 35', 73'; Christopher 43'		Wright 87'

Bridge Meadow Stadium, Haverfordwest
Referee: Phil Southall

2 October 2007
19:00

Bangor City	3–0	Aberystwyth Town
Edwards 16'; Stott 63'; Davies 82'

Farrar Road Stadium, Bangor
Referee: Huw Jones

== Second round ==
5 November 2007
19:00

Haverfordwest County	0–2	Welshpool Town
		Rogers 4', 53'

Bridge Meadow Stadium, Haverfordwest
Referee: Dean John

6 November 2007
19:00

Newport County	1–0	Bangor City
Griffin 90'

Newport Stadium, Newport
Attendance: 403
Referee: Ceri Richards

6 November 2007
19:00

Llanelli	4–1	Rhyl
Jones 1'; Williams 55'; Griffiths 82'; Holloway 84'		Moran 83' (pen.)

Stebonheath Park, Llanelli
Attendance: 432
Referee: Mark Whitby

6 November 2007
19:00

Carmarthen Town	2–1 (a.e.t.)	Port Talbot Town
Easter 90'; Cotterrall 102'		Rose 33'

Richmond Park, Carmarthen
Attendance: 214
Referee: Steve Hames

== Quarter-finals ==
All three Welsh sides competing in the Football League, Cardiff City, Swansea City and Wrexham, entered in the quarter-finals along with reigning holders The New Saints. Due to heavy rain, several of the quarter-final ties were postponed on more than one occasion resulting in the round lasting more than one month.

19 December 2007
19:30

Newport County	1–0	Swansea City
Griffin 90'	Report

Newport Stadium, Newport
Attendance: 816
Referee: Steve Hames

9 January 2008
19:00

Llanelli	4–2 (a.e.t.)	Wrexham
Griffiths 24', 89'; Holloway 94', 96'	Report	Llewellyn 12', 23'

Stebonheath Park, Llanelli
Attendance: 427
Referee: Mark Whitby

22 January 2008
19:00

Welshpool Town	0–1	Cardiff City
	Report	Brown 85'

Maes y Dre Recreation Ground, Welshpool
Attendance: 700
Referee: Lee Evans

29 January 2008
19:00

Carmarthen Town	3–1 (a.e.t.)	The New Saints
Hicks 41', 96', 116'	Report	Toner 36'

Richmond Park, Carmarthen
Referee: Dean John

== Semi-finals ==
19 February 2008
19:00

Cardiff City	1–1 (a.e.t.)	Newport County
Thompson 115'	Report	Bowen 113'
Penalties
Sinclair (penalty scored); Blake (penalty scored); Loovens (penalty scored); Wade (penalty scored); Thompson (penalty missed); Carlile (penalty missed)	4–5	Bowen (penalty scored); Alsop (penalty scored); Evans (penalty scored); Fowler (penalty scored); Searle (penalty missed); Jarman (penalty scored)

Ninian Park, Cardiff
Attendance: 1,960
Referee: Lee Evans

26 February 2008
19:00

Llanelli	1–0	Carmarthen Town
Pritchard 22'	Report

Stebonheath Park, Llanelli
Referee: Mark Whitby

== Final ==
11 March 2008
19:00

Newport County	1–0	Llanelli
Hughes 82'	Report

Newport Stadium, Newport
Attendance: 1,889
Referee: Lee Evans

== Top scorers ==
Rank	Scorer	Club	Goals
1.	(Wales) Rhys Griffiths	Llanelli	3
1.	(Wales) Tim Hicks	Carmarthen Town	3
1.	(Wales) Chris Holloway	Llanelli	3
1.	(Wales) Kerry Morgan	Port Talbot Town	3
1.	(England) Martin Rose	Port Talbot Town	3
2.	(England) Charlie Griffin	Newport County	2
2.	(Wales) Chris Llewellyn	Wrexham	2
2.	(England) Steve Rogers	Welshpool Town	2
2.	(Wales) Nick Woodrow	Haverfordwest County	2
