= List of Maidstone United F.C. managers =

The following is a list of managers of Maidstone United Football Club and their honours from the reformation of the club in 1992 to the present day.

== History ==
Maidstone's first managers since reformation were Bill Tucker and Jack Whiteley, who were appointed in a joint role. Maidstone joined the Kent County League Division Four for the 1993–94 season and won the league at the first attempt. Tucker and Whiteley's team also won the West Kent Challenge Shield and the Tunbridge Wells Charity Cup. In their second season they won the Kent County League Division Two title (Maidstone moved from Division Four to Division Two thanks to restructuring) and the Kent Junior Cup, and also reached the final of the West Kent Challenge Shield. However, Tucker and Whiteley could not get Maidstone promoted to the County League Premier Division, and Maidstone went through a succession of managers before finally winning promotion in 1999. Graham Martin was appointed in the wake of Tucker and Whiteley in 1996, but lasted less than a year before being replaced by Mickey Chatwin and Chad Andrews, with Maidstone again opting to employ joint managers. However Chatwin and Andrews did not last the season and were replaced by Nicky Chappell, before Mark Irvine took over for the 1997–98 season. Irvine was not the man to bring success to the Stones either, and he was succeeded by Jason Lillis. Lillis won the Kent County League First Division and got Maidstone promoted to the Premier Division.

In the 1999 close season Lillis was replaced by Matt Toms. Toms led his side to a 3rd-place finish and the team also picked up the Weald of Kent Charity Cup. In the 2000–01 season Toms saw his side finish first and win the Weald of Kent Charity Cup, but more importantly his side gained senior status and were elevated to the Kent League Premier Division. Jim Ward took over from Toms in the 2001 close season and led Maidstone to the Kent League title, his side also picking up the Kent League Premier Division Cup. However, Maidstone could not be promoted due to lease problems at their 'home' ground in Sittingbourne. In the 2002–03 season Maidstone won the Kent League Charity Shield and the Kent Senior Trophy, and finished 2nd in the league. Mal Walkins took over from Ward in December 2003, but a disappointing finish of 4th saw him replaced by Lloyd Hume in 2004. Hume won the Kent League and the Kent League Premier Division Cup in his second season in charge, and his side were promoted to the Isthmian League Division One South in April 2006. In the pre season of that year Alan Walker was promoted from Hume's assistant to joint manager, and together they won the 2006–07 Isthmian One South title, gaining promotion to the Isthmian League Premier Division. Hume and Alan Walker registered two lower table finishes before resigning in early 2010. Reserve team manager Peter Nott took over and kept Maidstone from relegation, but was sacked in October 2010 after a poor start to the 2010–11 season. Nott was replaced by Andy Ford, who lasted under six months before resigning with Maidstone rooted to the bottom of the Isthmian Premier Division. Club captain Jay Saunders was appointed as caretaker manager and masterminded an astounding upturn in the team's fortunes, winning 5 of his nine games in charge. However, it was not enough to save the club from relegation. Saunders was subsequently appointed the club's permanent manager in May 2011.

== Statistics ==
Information correct as of match played 4 May 2013. Only competitive matches are counted.

- (n/a) = Information not available

=== 1993–2004 ===
Information from 1993–2004 is scarce due a to the obscure nature of the leagues played in.

Name	Nationality	From	To	Honours
Bill Tucker and Jack Whiteley	England	1993	1996	Kent County League Division Four champions (1994); Tunbridge Wells Charity Cup winners (1994); West Kent Challenge Shield winners (1994); Kent County League Division Two champions (1995); Kent Junior Cup winners (1995)
Graham Martin	England	1996	1996	
Mickey Chatwin and Chad Andrews	England	1997	1997	
Nicky Chappell	England	1997	1997	
Mark Irvine	England	1997	1998	
Jason Lillis	England	1998	1999	Kent County League Division One champions (1999); West Kent Challenge Shield winners (1999)
Matt Toms	England	1999	2001	2 Weald of Kent Charity Cup winners (1999, 2000)
Jim Ward	Scotland	2001	15 December 2003	Kent League Premier Division champions (2002); Kent League Premier Division Cup winners (2002); 2 Kent League Charity/Challenge Shield winners (2002, 2003); Kent Senior Trophy winners (2003)
Mal Watkins^{(c+)}	England	15 December 2003	17 May 2004	

=== 2004–present ===
Name	Nationality	From	To	P	W	D	L	GF	GA	Win%	Honours
Lloyd Hume ^{(p)}	England	17 May 2004	22 May 2006	91	59	14	18	223	99	64.84%	Kent League Premier Division champions (2006); Kent League Premier Division Cup winners (2006)
Lloyd Hume ^{(p+)} and Alan Walker	England	22 May 2006	8 February 2010	191	77	39	75	257	255	40.31%	Isthmian League Division One South winners (2007)
Peter Nott	England	8 February 2010	18 October 2010	34	7	8	19	29	54	20.59%	
Andy Ford	England	19 October 2010	15 March 2011	25	4	6	15	18	43	16.00%	
Jay Saunders ^{(c+)(p+)}	England	17 March 2011	28 August 2018	?	?	?	?	?	?	?	Isthmian League Division One South playoff winners (2013); Isthmian League Cup winners (2014); Isthmian League Premier Division champions (2015); National League South playoff winners (2016)
Steve Watt^{(c)}	England	28 August 2018	11 September 2018	3	0	0	3	0	3	0.00%	
Harry Wheeler	England	11 September 2018	28 December 2018	?	?	?	?	?	?	?	

Key
^{(c)} Served as caretaker manager.
^{(c+)} Served as caretaker manager before being appointed permanently.
^{(p)} Served as player manager.
^{(p+)} Served as player manager before becoming regular manager.
