= Pat Gavin =

English footballer

Personal information
- Full name: Patrick John Gavin
- Date of birth: 5 June 1967 (age 59)
- Place of birth: Hammersmith, London, England
- Position: Striker

Senior career*
Years	Team	Apps	(Gls)
–1989	Hanwell Town		
1988–1989	Gillingham	13	(7)
1989–1991	Leicester City	3	(0)
1989–1990	→ Gillingham (loan)	34	(1)
1991–1993	Peterborough United	23	(5)
1993–1993	Northampton Town	14	(4)
1993–1995	Wigan Athletic	42	(8)
1995–1997	Farnborough Town		
1997–2003	Harrow Borough		
2003	Chelmsford City		
2003–2004	Hendon	22	(1)
2005–2007	Hanwell Town		
- * Club domestic league appearances and goals

Patrick John Gavin (born 5 June 1967) is an English retired footballer. He played as a striker for several clubs, with probably his most successful spell coming at Gillingham.

== Career ==
Gavin started out playing for non-league Hanwell Town whilst working as a postman (earning him the nickname "Postman Pat") before he was signed on a short-term contract by Gillingham of the Football League Third Division towards the end of the 1988-89 season. This was the first transfer deal for which Hanwell had ever received a fee. He scored seven goals in just thirteen games, although this was not enough to save the Gills from relegation. Impressed with his ability, Gillingham moved quickly to sign him to a permanent contract, however due to an oversight the contract was not correctly registered with the Football League. As this left Gavin technically out of contract, First Division club Leicester City were able to sign him up. After protracted wrangling, Leicester agreed to allow him to return to Gillingham on loan for the 1989-90 season but the controversy affected his form and he scored just one goal in over thirty matches.

Upon his return to Leicester he was unable to secure a first-team place and moved on to Peterborough United for a fee of £15,000. Gavin broke a club record by scoring in his first five consecutive matches, helping the Posh to promotion that season.

He later played for Northampton Town and Wigan Athletic before drifting into non-league football, starting with two seasons at Farnborough Town. During his time with Northampton Town, he scored two goals against Shrewsbury Town on the last day of the 1992-93 season which left Northampton as 3-2 winners, thus preserving their league status.

In 2005 Gavin returned to the club where he had started his career, Hanwell Town, initially as player-coach. In January 2006 he stepped up to the role of joint manager, but his tenure ended in February 2007.

== Sources ==
- Roger Triggs (2001). The Men Who Made Gillingham Football Club. Tempus Publishing Ltd. ISBN 0-7524-2243-X.
- Pat Gavin at Soccerbase
- Pat Gavin career stats
