= Lindon Guscott =

English footballer

Lindon Guscott (born 29 March 1972) is an English former footballer. He made 2 appearances in The Football League for Gillingham.
