= Andy Perry (footballer) =

English footballer

Andrew Perry (born 28 December 1962 in Dulwich) is an English former professional footballer. He made a total of 17 appearances in The Football League for Portsmouth and Gillingham.
