= Keith Blunt =

English football manager (1939–2016)

Keith Blunt (c. 1939 – 12 August 2016) was an English football coach. He was first team coach at Plymouth Argyle before leaving to manage Sutton United from the late seventies until moving onto Malmö and then Viking in 1984. In 1987, he was coach of Tottenham Hotspur's youth team, before leaving to join Gillingham. In 1997, Blunt was head coach at the Centre of Excellence in Lilleshall in England. From 1998, he worked as a football coach at various teams in China, including the national women's team, the men's U-23 and U-19.

He spent time with Loughborough College.
