= Malcolm Smith (footballer, born 1970) =

English footballer

Personal information
- Full name: Malcolm Alan Smith
- Date of birth: 3 August 1970 (age 56)
- Place of birth: Maidstone, Kent, England
- Position: Midfielder

Youth career
- –1988: Gillingham

Senior career*
Years	Team	Apps	(Gls)
1988–	Gillingham	2	(0)
- Hythe Town
Total		2	(0)
- * Club domestic league appearances and goals

Malcolm Alan Smith (born 3 August 1970) is an English former professional footballer who played as a midfielder in the Football League for Gillingham and in non-League football for Hythe Town.
