= Brian Clarke (footballer, born 1968) =

English footballer

Personal information
- Full name: Brian Roy Clarke
- Date of birth: 10 October 1968 (age 58)
- Place of birth: Eastbourne, England
- Position: Defender

Youth career
- Eastbourne Town
- 1983–1988: Gillingham

Senior career*
Years	Team	Apps	(Gls)
1988–1992	Gillingham	44	(0)
1992–?	Sittingbourne	?	(?)
- * Club domestic league appearances and goals

Brian Roy Clarke (born 10 October 1968) is an English former professional footballer. Born in Eastbourne, he played for Gillingham between 1988 and 1992, making 52 appearances, 44 were in the Football League until he sustained a knee injury. He later played for Sittingbourne
