= Chris Holloway =

Welsh footballer

Personal information
- Full name: Christopher Holloway
- Date of birth: 5 February 1980 (age 46)
- Place of birth: Swansea, Wales
- Height: 5 ft 10 in (1.78 m)
- Position: Midfielder

Youth career
- –1997: Exeter City

Senior career*
| Years | Team | Apps | (Gls) |
| 1997–2001 | Exeter City | 68 | (2) |
| 2001–2002 | Rotherham United | 0 | (0) |
| 2002 | Newport County | 2 | (0) |
| 2002–2004 | Tiverton Town | 59 | (1) |
| 2004–2005 | Merthyr Tydfil | 27 | (5) |
| 2005–2006 | Tiverton Town | 32 | (4) |
| 2006–2007 | Merthyr Tydfil | 27 | (7) |
| 2007–2012 | Llanelli | 70 | (8) |
| 2012– | Haverfordwest County | 5 | (1) |

International career
| | Wales U21 | 2 | (?) |
| | Wales Semi-Pro | 7 | (?) |
- * Club domestic league appearances and goals as of 09:32, 13 March 2011 (UTC)

Christopher Holloway (born 5 February 1980) is a Welsh footballer. He was born in Swansea.

== Career ==
A Welsh former under-21 and current Welsh semi-professional international, Holloway started his career at Exeter City where he made over 60 appearances before joining Rotherham United in 2001. He has also played for Newport County, Tiverton Town and Merthyr Tydfil, where he was voted 2005 player of the year, leaving to join Llanelli in May 2007. He left the club in June 2012 after being released. In July 2012, Holloway signed for Haverfordwest County.
