= Ivan Haines =

English footballer

Personal information
- Full name: Ivan Gerald Haines
- Date of birth: 14 September 1968 (age 58)
- Place of birth: Chatham, England
- Position: Defender

Senior career*
Years	Team	Apps	(Gls)
1987–1991	Gillingham	51	(0)
- * Club domestic league appearances and goals

Ivan Gerald Haines (born 14 September 1968) is an English former professional footballer who played as a central defender.

Born in Chatham, Haines played for Gillingham between 1987 and 1991, making 51 appearances in the Football League.
