= George Shipley (footballer) =

English footballer

Personal information
- Full name: George Michael Shipley
- Date of birth: 7 March 1959 (age 67)
- Place of birth: Newcastle, England
- Position: Midfielder

Youth career
- 1975–1977: Southampton

Senior career*
Years	Team	Apps	(Gls)
1977–1980	Southampton	3	(0)
1979	→ Reading (loan)	12	(1)
1979	→ Blackpool (loan)	0	(0)
1980–1985	Lincoln City	230	(42)
1985–1987	Charlton Athletic	61	(6)
1987–1989	Gillingham	29	(3)
1989	Lincoln City	0	(0)
- * Club domestic league appearances and goals

George Michael Shipley (born 7 March 1959 in Newcastle) is an English former professional footballer. He played for six clubs but spent the majority of his career with Lincoln City.

== Playing career ==
Shipley was one of several players discovered by Southampton's scouting network in the North East and was brought to The Dell as a trainee in August 1975. After regular appearances for the reserves, he signed professional papers on his 18th birthday in March 1977. For the next two seasons he was a regular fixture in the reserves and, after a loan spell with Reading at the end of the 1978–79 season, he eventually made his first team appearance as a substitute in a First Division match at Crystal Palace on 21 August 1979. He started the next two games but despite an "assist" for the winning goal in a home victory over Liverpool he never played for the Saints again.

After a loan spell with Blackpool in October 1979, he joined Lincoln City in January 1980 for a then club record £45,000. A tenacious midfielder, he remained with Lincoln City for the next 5 years, making a total of 274 appearances and 52 goals. He was recently voted number 24 in the top 100 league legends at Lincoln. In his last game for Lincoln he was to witness a nightmare when 56 spectators were killed in a horrendous stand fire while playing Bradford City.

He joined Charlton Athletic in July 1985 and was a regular member of the side who came runners-up in Division 2 in 1985–86, thus gaining promotion to the First Division. In 1986–87, Shipley managed to hang on to his place in the team who struggled to avoid relegation. He then joined Gillingham for the next two seasons, before returning to Lincoln City on a non-contract basis for a short period at the end of 1989.

== Training career ==
After a period scouting for Maidstone United, he returned to Gillingham as youth team manager in July 1991 before quickly moving on to fill a similar position at Middlesbrough. In June 1994, he became assistant manager at Bradford City. He later became the Football in the Community Personnel Manager with Newcastle United.

== Honours ==
Lincoln City

- Football League Group Cup runner-up: 1982–83

Charlton Athletic

- Full Members' Cup runner-up: 1986–87
