= Charlie Griffin (footballer) =

English association football player (born 1979)

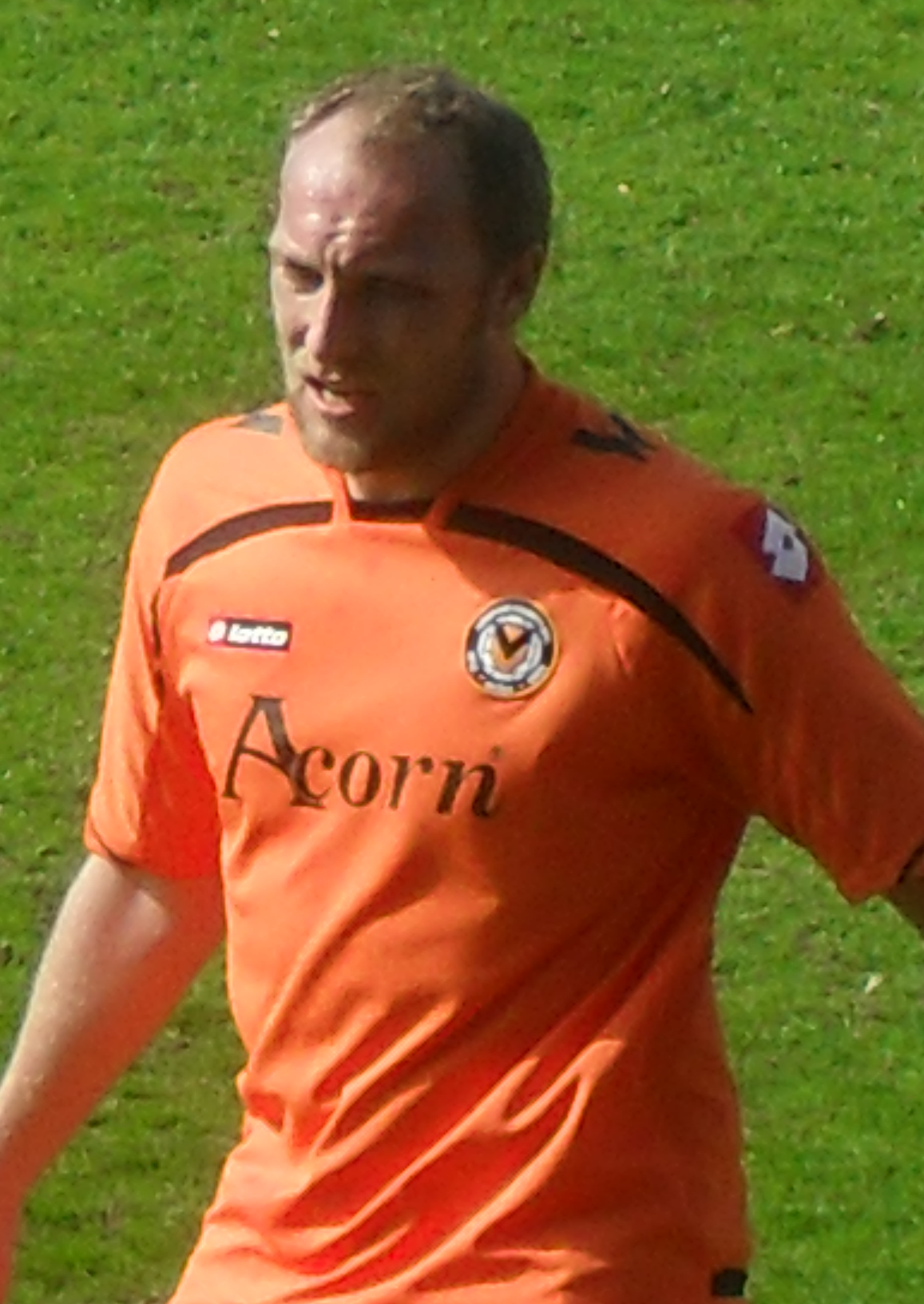
- Griffin playing for Newport County in 2011

Personal information
- Full name: Charles John Griffin
- Date of birth: 25 June 1979 (age 47)
- Place of birth: Bath, England
- Height: 6 ft 0 in (1.83 m)
- Position: Striker

Youth career
- 1996–1998: Bristol Rovers

Senior career*
Years	Team	Apps	(Gls)
1998–1999	Chippenham Town	30	(21)
1999–2000	Swindon Town	28	(2)
1999	→ Yeovil Town (loan)	3	(1)
2000	→ Woking (loan)	3	(2)
2001–2003	Woking	55	(23)
2001–2002	→ Havant & Waterlooville (loan)	5	(1)
2003–2004	Chippenham Town	32	(23)
2004–2005	Forest Green Rovers	38	(16)
2005–2007	Wycombe Wanderers	21	(3)
2006–2007	→ Forest Green Rovers (loan)	12	(1)
2007–2008	Newport County	49	(26)
2008–2009	Salisbury City	45	(21)
2009–2011	Stevenage	41	(16)
2011	→ Newport County (loan)	15	(3)
2011–2012	Forest Green Rovers	28	(7)
2012	→ Salisbury City (loan)	14	(3)
2012–2013	Bath City	35	(15)
2013–2014	Brackley Town	16	(5)
2014–2015	Gloucester City	41	(17)
2015	Chippenham Town	10	(6)
2015–2016	Cirencester Town	46	(22)
Total		567	(234)

Managerial career
- 2016–2019: Cirencester Town
- * Club domestic league appearances and goals

Charles John Griffin (born 25 June 1979) is an English former professional footballer.

Griffin started his career with Bristol Rovers, spending two years at the club and progressing through the club's youth system. He was released at the age of 18 and played part-time football with Chippenham Town for a season. He attracted the attention of Swindon Town in February 1999, signing for the club for a transfer fee of £10,000. He made the majority of his appearances for the club off the bench, and was loaned out to both Yeovil Town and Woking respectively the following season. He joined Woking permanently in 2001, and spent one and a half years with the club – although he had a short loan spell at Havant & Waterlooville in December 2001.

He was released by Woking in 2003, and re-joined Chippenham Town ahead of the 2003–04 season. He impressed during his second tenure at the club, and earned a move back into the highest tier of non-league football in the summer of 2004; signing for Forest Green Rovers. His impressive form for a struggling side earned him a move back into the Football League; this time with Wycombe Wanderers, although he was loaned back out to Forest Green in July 2006 on a season long loan. His loan spell was cut short, and he signed for Newport County in February 2007; spending a season and a half with the Welsh side. He rejected a contract offer from the club in July 2008, and instead joined Salisbury City after a successful trial period with the Wiltshire outfit. His successful spell at Salisbury during the club's 2008–09 campaign earned him a move to Stevenage on a free transfer in May 2009. Griffin helped the club earn promotion to the Football League for the first time in the club's history in his first season at the club. As of June 2021, Griffin had joined the Melksham Town veterans' squad.

== Career ==
Griffin began his league career with Swindon Town in February 1999, having signed from non-league neighbours Chippenham Town for £10,000. After only starting eight games for the Robins though he stepped down to the Conference with Woking having enjoyed a fruitful loan spell there whilst still at the County Ground. He then joined Chippenham Town on loan before making the move permanent in 2002.

In the summer of 2004 Griffin moved to Forest Green Rovers. Since then an impressive scoring record has seen his name touted around various league clubs but it was not until his 20 league and cup goals for Forest Green Rovers during the 2004–05 season that a serious move was made for the talisman. Griffin was given another shot at League football with Wycombe Wanderers when he became John Gorman's first summer signing for the 2005–06 season.

In early July 2006, Griffin turned down Woking to re-join Forest Green Rovers on a season-long loan with an option for recall to Wycombe in the January transfer window. This did not materialise and he signed for Newport County on 14 February 2007. During his time at Newport they twice narrowly missed out on the promotion play-offs and twice appeared in the FAW Premier Cup final, winning the 2008 final. Griffin was top scorer for Newport County in the 2007–08 season but in July 2008 he left Newport after turning down the offer of a new contract.

In the same month he joined Salisbury City on trial but was let go after not being needed. However, Nick Holmes soon went back on his decision and signed him just in time to be in the squad for Salisbury's first game of the season. He made his debut for Salisbury in a game against his former employers, Forest Green Rovers, which ended 2–1 to Salisbury. In the following game, Griffin scored his first goals for the club; scoring a brace in a 4–1 victory against Lewes. In total, he scored 23 goals in 48 appearances throughout the 2008–09 season.

In May 2009, Griffin signed for Stevenage on a free transfer. He made his Stevenage debut in a 1–1 draw against Tamworth in the first game of the 2009–10 season. Following a brief spell out of the first team, Griffin scored his first goal for the Hertfordshire side in a 3–2 victory away at Mansfield Town; slamming the ball into the back of the net to score Stevenage's third, a goal that ultimately ended Mansfield's nine-month unbeaten home record. Griffin followed the goal up with a hat-trick against Hayes & Yeading, and goals against Salisbury City, Chelmsford City, and Port Vale, the latter two coming in the FA Cup. The following week, he scored his second hat-trick of the season against Gateshead at Broadhall Way. Griffin scored a vital goal for Stevenage in a 1–0 victory against Altrincham in April 2010, coming on a substitute in the 78th minute and scoring the only goal of the game five minutes later. He scored yet another important goal just three days later, scoring the first goal in a 2–0 win against Kidderminster Harriers in a game that witnessed Stevenage secure promotion to the Football League for the first time in their history. Griffin played a total of 32 times in his debut season with the Hertfordshire side, scoring an instrumental 15 times.

Ahead of the 2010–11 season, Griffin scored in pre-season friendlies against both Chelmsford City and Hitchin Town respectively. He subsequently started in the club's first ever Football League fixture against Macclesfield Town, assisting Peter Vincenti's goal before scoring the equalising goal for Stevenage in the 89th minute. In Stevenage's next home league fixture, Griffin scored twice as Stevenage secured their first three points of the season after beating Stockport County 3–1. In September 2010, Griffin signed an extended contract with the club that keeps him at Stevenage until 2012. In January 2011, Griffin signed for Conference National side Newport County on loan until the end of the 2010–11 season.

After being released by Stevenage at the end of the season, Griffin re-joined former club, Forest Green Rovers. Griffin made his third 'debut' for Forest Green on 12 August 2011 in a 1–1 draw with Stockport County in a match that was televised live on Premier Sports. Four days later, he scored his first goal of the 2011–12 season in a 1–1 draw at Kenilworth Road against Luton Town, giving Forest Green the lead just after half-time.

On 20 February 2012, Griffin re-joined Salisbury City on loan from Forest Green until the end of the season. On his return to Forest Green at the end of the season Griffin was released by the club and in July 2012 it was announced that he had signed for Bath City.

Griffin made a promising start for Bath City, with 9 goals in 14 games for the Conference South side and would go on to finish the season as the club's top goal scorer. Despite this he was released by the club in May 2013.

Following his release from Bath, Griffin joined Conference North side Brackley Town in June 2013. Griffin then joined Conference North club Gloucester City until the end of the 2013/2014 season.

On Thursday 26 February 2015, it was announced that Griffin had signed for Chippenham Town. He joined fellow Southern Football League Premier Division members Cirencester Town during the summer of 2015. He became manager of the club in September the following year, remaining in post until November 2019.

== Honours ==
Newport County

- FAW Premier Cup (1): 2007–08

Stevenage

- Conference National (1): 2009–10

== Career statistics ==
As of 21 August 2016

Appearances and goals by club, season and competition
Club	Season	League^{[A]}		FA Cup		League Cup		Other^{[B]}		Total	
Club	Season	Apps	Goals	Apps	Goals	Apps	Goals	Apps	Goals	Apps	Goals
Chippenham Town	1998–99	30	21	2	1	0	0	0	0	32	22
Chippenham Town	Total	30	21	2	1	0	0	0	0	32	22
Swindon Town	1998–99	5	1	0	0	0	0	0	0	5	1
Swindon Town	1999–2000	21	1	1	0	1	0	0	0	23	1
Swindon Town	2000–01	2	0	0	0	0	0	0	0	2	0
Swindon Town	Total	28	2	1	0	1	0	0	0	30	2
Yeovil Town (loan)	1999–2000	3	1	0	0	0	0	0	0	3	1
Yeovil Town (loan)	Total	3	1	0	0	0	0	0	0	3	1
Woking	2000–01	28	13	2	0	0	0	0	0	30	13
Woking	2001–02	30	10	1	0	0	0	0	0	31	10
Woking	2002–03	0	0	0	0	0	0	0	0	0	0
Woking	Total	58	23	3	0	0	0	0	0	61	23
Havant & Waterlooville (loan)	2001–02	5	1	0	0	0	0	0	0	5	1
Havant & Waterlooville (loan)	Total	5	1	0	0	0	0	0	0	5	1
Chippenham Town	2003–04	32	23	2	2	0	0	0	0	34	25
Chippenham Town	Total	32	23	2	2	0	0	0	0	34	25
Forest Green Rovers	2004–05	38	17	2	0	0	0	3	3	43	20
Forest Green Rovers	Total	38	17	2	0	0	0	3	3	43	20
Wycombe Wanderers	2005–06	21	3	1	0	0	0	4	4	26	7
Wycombe Wanderers	Total	21	3	1	0	0	0	4	4	26	7
Forest Green Rovers (loan)	2006–07	12	1	0	0	0	0	0	0	12	1
Forest Green Rovers (loan)	Total	12	1	0	0	0	0	0	0	12	1
Newport County	2006–07	14	8	0	0	0	0	0	0	14	8
Newport County	2007–08	35	18	0	0	0	0	2	1	37	19
Newport County	Total	49	26	0	0	0	0	2	1	51	27
Salisbury City	2008–09	45	21	1	0	0	0	2	2	48	23
Salisbury City	Total	45	21	1	0	0	0	2	2	48	23
Stevenage	2009–10	26	13	3	2	0	0	3	0	32	15
Stevenage	2010–11	15	3	1	0	1	0	0	0	17	3
Stevenage	Total	41	16	4	2	1	0	3	0	49	18
Newport County (loan)	2010–11	15	3	0	0	0	0	0	0	15	3
Newport County (loan)	Total	15	3	0	0	0	0	0	0	15	3
Forest Green Rovers	2011–12	28	7	1	0	0	0	0	0	29	7
Forest Green Rovers	Total	28	7	1	0	0	0	0	0	29	7
Salisbury City (loan)	2011–12	14	3	0	0	0	0	0	0	14	3
Salisbury City (loan)	Total	14	3	0	0	0	0	0	0	14	3
Bath City	2012–13	33	15	2	1	0	0	3	1	38	17
Bath City	Total	33	15	2	1	0	0	3	1	38	17
Gloucester City	2013–14	14	8	0	0	0	0	1	1	15	9
Gloucester City	2014–15	27	9	4	1	0	0	2	0	34	10
Gloucester City	Total	41	17	4	1	0	0	3	1	49	19
Cirencester Town	2015–16	42	21	0	0	7	5	0	0	49	26
Cirencester Town	2016–17	4	1	0	0	0	0	0	0	4	1
Cirencester Town	Total	46	22	0	0	7	5	0	0	53	27
Career totals		539	222	23	7	9	5	20	12	592	246

A. The "League" column constitutes appearances and goals (including those as a substitute) in the Football League, Football Conference and Southern Football League.
B. The "Other" column constitutes appearances and goals (including those as a substitute) in the FA Trophy and Football League Trophy.
