= Damon Searle =

Welsh footballer and coach

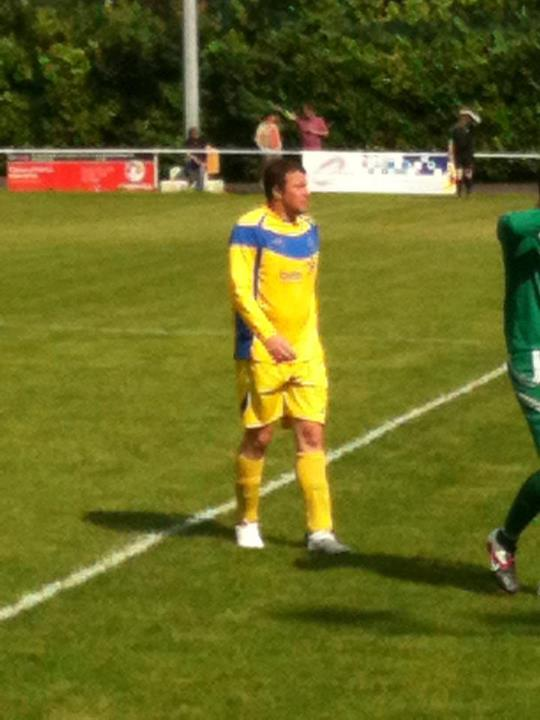

Personal information
- Full name: Damon Peter Searle
- Date of birth: 26 October 1971 (age 54)
- Place of birth: Cardiff, Wales
- Positions: Defender; midfielder

Youth career
- Cardiff City

Senior career*
Years	Team	Apps	(Gls)
1990–1996	Cardiff City	234	(3)
1996–1998	Stockport County	41	(0)
1998–2000	Carlisle United	66	(3)
1999	→ Rochdale (loan)	14	(0)
2000–2003	Southend United	133	(3)
2003	Chesterfield	5	(0)
2003–2004	Forest Green Rovers	31	(4)
2004	Hornchurch	13	(0)
2004–2006	Forest Green Rovers	63	(2)
2006–2008	Newport County	72	(3)
2008–2009	Carmarthen Town	3	(0)
2009	Barry Town	0	(0)
2009–2010	Haverfordwest County	15	(0)
2011–2018	Barry Town United	65	(2)

International career
- Wales U21
- * Club domestic league appearances and goals

Damon Peter Searle (born 26 October 1971) is a Welsh former professional footballer.

== Career ==
Searle began his career as a trainee at his home town club Cardiff City. It was here that he spent the major part of his career before leaving on a free transfer to sign for Stockport County. In the following years he left Stockport and played for Carlisle United, during which time he had a short loan spell at Rochdale, before moving to Southend United as a replacement for, the previous seasons player of the year, Nathan Jones. He appeared in the famous Jimmy Glass game against Plymouth Argyle, in which the goalkeeper scored in the 94th minute to keep Carlisle United in the Football League. He was released by Southend in the summer of 2003 and was signed on a month by month deal by Chesterfield as short term cover for several of their injured players but he was soon released by the club.

He spent the rest of his career in the lower leagues with Forest Green Rovers before moving back to his home country by signing for Newport County and captained the side on several occasions. During his time at Newport they twice narrowly missed out on the promotion play-offs and twice appeared in the FAW Premier Cup final, winning the 2008 final. Searle was released by Newport at the end of the 2007–08 season and went on to sign for Carmarthen Town.

In February 2009 Searle left Carmarthen and signed for his home town club Barry Town. However, he left the club at the end of the season and joined Haverfordwest County where he remained until January 2010.

Searle is also currently on the coaching staff of local Barry Team Cadoxton Imps. He also works with the Cardiff City Premier Club and Commercial Departments. Later on he would return to Barry Town alongside manager and friend Gavin Chesterfield as an assistant manager.

== International career ==
Searle is a former Wales under-21 international.

== Honours ==
Cardiff City

- Football League Third Division: 1992–93
- Welsh Cup: 1991–92, 1992–93; runner up: 1993–94, 1994–95

Individual

- PFA Team of the Year: 1992–93 Third Division
