= Jason Lillis =

English footballer (born 1969)

Personal information
- Full name: Jason Warren Lillis
- Date of birth: 1 October 1969 (age 57)
- Place of birth: Chatham, Kent, England
- Position: Striker

Youth career
- Gillingham

Senior career*
Years	Team	Apps	(Gls)
1987–1989	Gillingham	29	(3)
1989	FF Jaro	6	(3)
1989	Queens Park Rangers	0	(0)
1989–1992	Maidstone United	75	(18)
1991	→ Carlisle United (loan)	4	(1)
1992–1993	Sittingbourne	28	(21)
1993–1994	Walsall	25	(6)
1994–1995	Cambridge United	19	(4)
1995	→ Dover Athletic (loan)		
1995	Sittingbourne	7	(3)
1995	Lordswood		
1995–1996	Chatham Town		
1996–1997	Ashford Town	3	(0)
1997	Lordswood		
1998–1999	Palmerston		

Managerial career
- 1998–1999: Maidstone United
- Herne Bay
- Lordswood
- * Club domestic league appearances and goals

Jason Warren Lillis (born 1 October 1969) is an English former professional footballer who played as a striker. He made a total of 151 appearances, scoring 22 goals in the Football League playing for Gillingham, Maidstone United, Carlisle United, Walsall and Cambridge United.

== Career ==
Lillis progressed from the Gillingham junior ranks and made his league debut aged 18 in a Third Division match on 29 August 1987 against Southend United. His first goal for the club, scored on 14 November 1987, was Gillingham's first in a 2–1 FA Cup victory over Fulham. After making a total of 29 league appearances, scoring three goals, Lillis was released by Gillingham in the spring of 1989, and via a spell with FF Jaro in Finland and a short period with Queens Park Rangers (where he played a few reserve team games), his next matches in the Football League were for newcomers Maidstone United in the Fourth Division. He signed for the club, managed by his former Gillingham manager Keith Peacock, in the summer of 1989 and spent three seasons with the club, appearing in 75 league games and scoring 18 goals, which included a hat-trick on 10 March 1990 against Colchester United. During his time with Maidstone United in February 1991, Lillis had a short loan spell with Carlisle United, playing in four league matches and scoring one goal.

On leaving Maidstone United in June 1992, Lillis joined Sittingbourne. The club was newly promoted to the Southern League, and they won the 1992–93 Southern Division when he was with the club. In October 1993, Lillis returned to the Football League when he was signed by Third Division club Walsall. He played in 24 league matches, scoring six goals for the club in the 1993–94 season, but after a single substitute appearance at the start of the next season, he left the club and was signed on a non-contract basis by Second Division club Cambridge United. After scoring four league goals in 19 appearances for Cambridge, Lillis moved to non-league football: in March 1994, he was loaned to Dover Athletic and, although briefly recalled by Cambridge United, in April 1994, Lillis signed for former club Sittingbourne. Thereafter, he played with Ashford Town of the Southern League, Kent League clubs Chatham Town, and twice with Lordswood, before, in 1998, turning out for Palmerston of the Medway Sunday league.

In 1998, Lillis was the manager at the new Maidstone United in the Kent County League and was then assistant manager of Whitstable Town. Lillis also had spells as manager of Lordswood, and as a coach at Folkestone Invicta, and in 2018, Lillis was Head of Academy Education at Gillingham.
