= Richard Evans (footballer, born 1983) =

Welsh footballer

Personal information
- Date of birth: 19 June 1983 (age 43)
- Place of birth: Cardiff, Wales
- Position: Midfielder

Team information
- Current team: Chippenham Town

Senior career*
Years	Team	Apps	(Gls)
2002–2003	Birmingham City	0	(0)
2003–2006	Sheffield Wednesday	10	(1)
2006	Shrewsbury Town	6	(0)
2006–2008	Newport County	67	(5)
2008–2010	Bath City	30	(3)
2010–2011	Haverfordwest County		
2011	Port Talbot Town		
2011–2012	Aberaman Athletic		
2012–	Chippenham Town		

International career
- Wales U-21
- * Club domestic league appearances and goals as of 00:18 10 May 2010

Richard Evans (born 19 June 1983) is a Welsh professional footballer. He has been capped by Wales U21s and plays for Chippenham Town.

== Career ==
Evans began his career as a trainee with Birmingham City, but left having never made the first team. An injury-hit three-year spell at Sheffield Wednesday followed, in which he made just 10 appearances for the Yorkshire club, scoring a solitary goal against Burnley in the 47th minute of a 7–2 victory in the penultimate game of the 2002–03 season on 26 April 2003 at Turf Moor.

Evans made his Shrewsbury Town debut shortly after signing on a free transfer in the January 2006 transfer window, in a 2–1 Football League Two defeat to Notts County on 21 January 2006. A hamstring injury reduced his 2005–06 season to just six appearances.

Evans was released by Shrewsbury on 9 May 2006, having failed to prove his value to manager Gary Peters.

Evans was signed by Newport County three months later. He seemed to overcome his injury problems in his first season as he played 42 times, scoring three goals. Evans contract with Newport was cancelled in October 2008 by mutual consent. After his release, he signed with Bath City where he spent two seasons before moving to Haverfordwest County.

He is the younger brother of Mark Evans who played for Newport County in the 1990s.

In the summer of 2011 he joined Port Talbot Town but although he played in pre-season matches, he left on 31 August 2011 without playing a competitive game, deciding to join Aberaman Athletic.

In February 2012 he joined Chippenham Town.

== Honours ==
Bath City

- Conference South play-off winner: 2009–10
