= Newport Stadium =

Sports venue in Newport, Wales

- Spytty Park
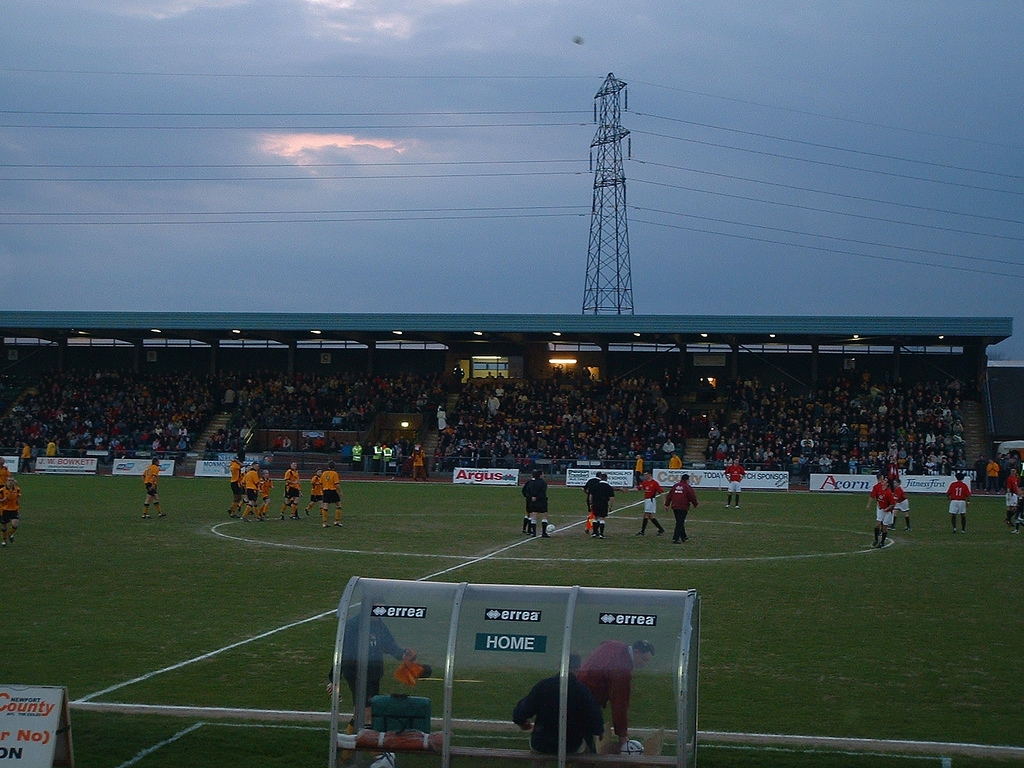
- View of the grandstand from the Shed (Newport County vs a Manchester United XI, 31 Mar 2004)
- Interactive map of Newport Stadium
- Location: Lliswerry, Newport NP19 4PT
- Coordinates: 51°34′26″N 2°57′34″W
- Owner: Newport City Council
- Operator: Newport City Council
- Capacity: 5,058 (3,246 seated)
- Surface: Grass
- Record attendance: 4,616

Construction
- Opened: 1994
- Expanded: 2004
- Cost: £7 million

Tenants
- Newport City FC; Newport RFC; Newport Harriers Athletic Club; Newport County A.F.C. (1994–2012)

Newport Stadium, also known as Spytty Park, is an association football, rugby and athletics stadium in Newport, South Wales. It is the home of Newport City Football Club, Newport RFC and Newport Harriers Athletic Club. It was previously also used for home matches by Newport County and Albion Rovers (Note: Not to be confused with the football club of the same name in Coatbridge, Scotland.) football clubs. Newport County continue to use the stadium as a base for youth teams and senior squad training. It is part of the Newport International Sports Village, a major sports complex managed by Newport City Council.

== Facilities ==
The stadium is owned and managed by Newport City Council and is part of the Newport International Sports Village, which includes the Wales National Velodrome.

It was upgraded to Conference National standard for football and had a capacity of 5,058 prior to Newport County relocating to Rodney Parade in 2012.

The stadium can accommodate international-standard track and field athletic events and is of Class 1 standard. The stadium floodlighting can achieve up to an average of 500 Lux.

In October 2021, Newport RFC relocated their home matches from Rodney Parade to Newport Stadium whilst agreeing with the WRU to play two matches per season at Rodney Parade.

== Layout ==
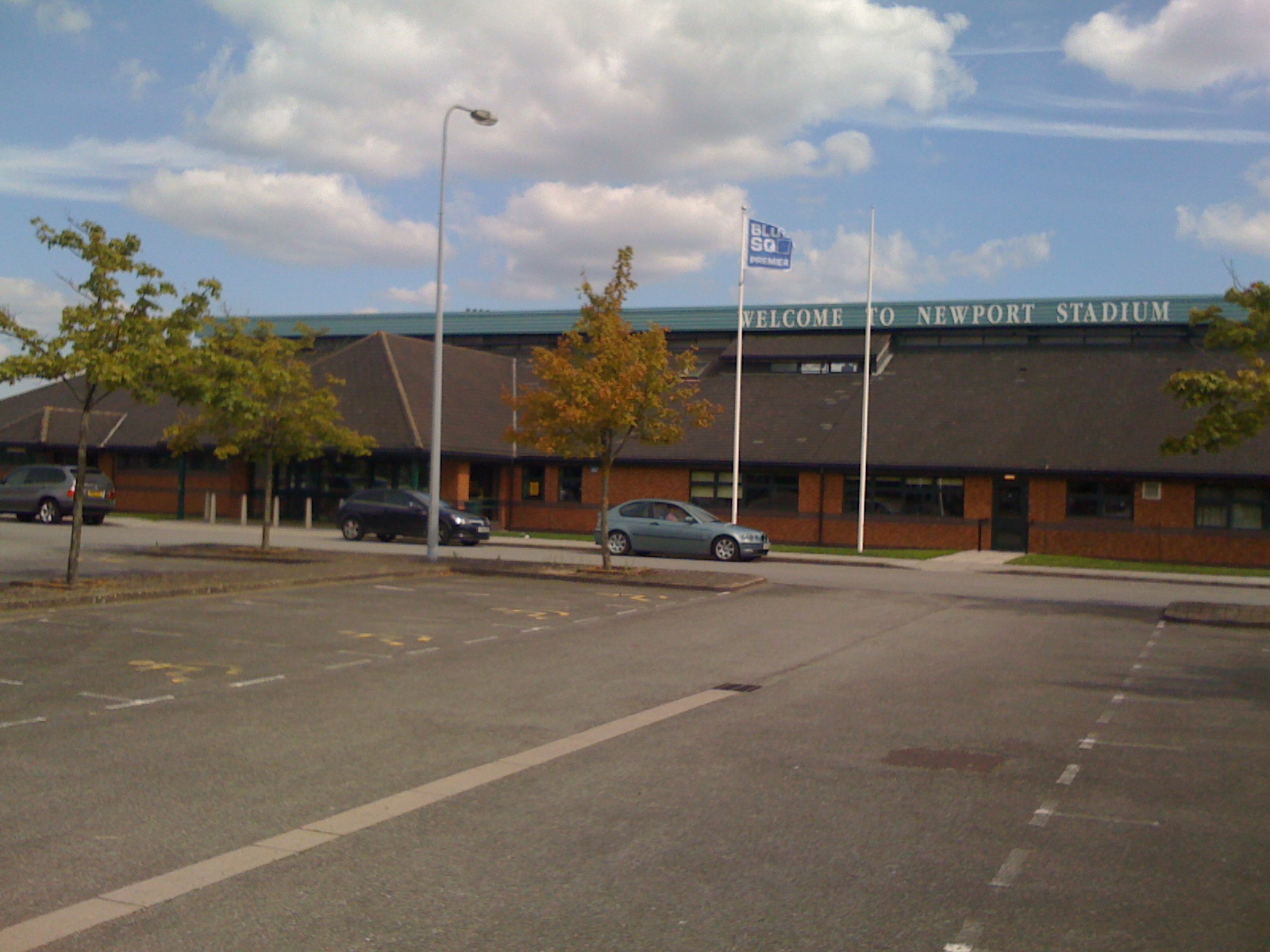
Newport Stadium grandstand entrance

The stadium has two covered stands along the touchlines of the pitch. The west stand is all-seated with a capacity of 1,100 spectators. The east stand is a 1,600-capacity covered standing terrace, commonly referred to as The Shed. An uncovered standing terrace also exists at the north end.

The stadium is approached from Spytty Road and has a large spectator car park.

=== Temporary and demountable stands ===
When Newport County played Blackpool in the 2001–02 FA Cup, a temporary all-seated stand was erected behind the goal at the north end in front of the terrace – at that time there was only the west stand and a very small north terrace. When Newport County played Swansea City in the 2006–07 FA Cup, a temporary stand was erected behind the goal at the south end.

In 2011 further all-seated uncovered demountable stands were erected behind each goal: A 949-seater stand at the south end and a 1,197-seater stand in front of the north terrace. This took the total capacity of the stadium to 5,058 with 3,246 seated.

== Football attendance records ==
The record attendance at the ground without temporary stands is 4,300 (a capacity crowd at the time) for Newport County against Manchester United in the 2003–04 season. With the addition of a temporary stand, the record attendance stands at 4,616, set for a Newport County FA Cup match against Swansea City on 11 November 2006.

== See also ==
- List of stadiums in Wales by capacity
