= 1989–90 Gillingham F.C. season =

English football club season

Gillingham
1989–90 season
- Chairman: M.G. Lukehurst
- Manager: Damien Richardson
- Fourth Division: 14th
- FA Cup: First round
- League Cup: First round
- Associate Members' Cup: First round
- Top goalscorer: League: Steve Lovell (16); All: Steve Lovell (18)
- Highest home attendance: 10,412 vs Maidstone United (26 December 1989)
- Lowest home attendance: 1,004 vs Cambridge United (28 November 1989)
Home colours	Away colours

During the 1989–90 English football season, Gillingham F.C. competed in the Football League Fourth Division, the fourth tier of the English football league system. It was the 58th season in which Gillingham competed in the Football League and the 40th since the club was voted back into the league in 1950. In the previous season, the team had been relegated from the Third Division, after which a number of players left the club, resulting in several teenagers playing in the opening games of the new season. Gillingham began their league campaign in poor form but a run of five consecutive wins in October and November took them into the top six. In December, the team lost to Maidstone United in the first Football League match between two Kent-based teams. Gillingham remained in contention for promotion until early March, but then lost six consecutive games; the team finished the season 14th in the Fourth Division.

Gillingham also competed in three knock-out competitions. The team were eliminated in the first round of both the FA Cup and Football League Cup. Gillingham progressed from the initial group stage of the Associate Members' Cup but lost in the first round proper. The team played a total of 53 competitive matches, winning 18, drawing 12 and losing 23. Steve Lovell was the team's top goalscorer, with 16 goals in the Fourth Division and a total of 18 in all competitions. Peter Johnson and Paul Haylock made the most appearances; each played 51 times in all competitions. The highest attendance recorded at the club's home ground, Priestfield Stadium, was 10,412, for the match against Maidstone.

== Background and pre-season ==
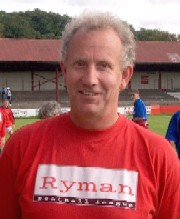
Veteran player Ron Hillyard (pictured in 2001) was appointed to the position of assistant manager.

The 1989–90 season was Gillingham's 58th season playing in the Football League and the 40th since the club was elected back into the League in 1950 after being voted out in 1938. At the end of the previous season, the club had been relegated from the Football League Third Division to the Fourth Division after finishing 23rd out of 24 teams, ending a spell of 15 seasons in the third tier of the English football league system.

At the start of the 1989–90 season, Damien Richardson was the club's manager, a post he had held since April 1989. Before the new season, Ron Hillyard, the club's long-serving goalkeeper, was appointed to the position of assistant manager. The management team signed two veteran defenders ahead of the first match of the new season: Tony Pulis from AFC Bournemouth for a transfer fee of £10,000 (equivalent to £30,000 in 2023), and Peter Johnson from Southend United on a free transfer. Many of the previous season's regular starting players left the club following relegation, including goalkeeper Phil Kite, defender George Burley, and midfielders Dave Smith and Gavin Peacock. During the break between seasons, the club was involved in controversy surrounding the status of Pat Gavin, a young forward who had joined Gillingham on a trial basis in the latter stages of the previous season. After he impressed with his performances, scoring 7 goals in 13 games, Gillingham signed him to a three-year contract at the end of the season. The contract was not registered with the Football League, however, and Leicester City of the Second Division signed the player, which they were able to do without having to pay any transfer fee as he was not technically under contract at Gillingham. Gillingham chief executive Barry Bright offered to resign over the error but the club's board of directors did not accept his resignation. In July, the club was taking legal advice over the situation.

The club retained the previous season's kit design, which added a pattern of thin white lines to the team's traditional blue shirts. The away kit, to be worn in the event of a clash of colours with the home team, was all-red. The team prepared for the new season with a number of friendly matches, including one against Wimbledon of the First Division; goalkeeper Jeremy Roberts played as a trialist in that game. Although he was included in the official team photograph for the season, he never played a competitive game for Gillingham and there is no record of him ever signing a contract with the club.

== Fourth Division ==
=== August–December ===
Gillingham's first game in the Fourth Division since 1974 took place at their home ground, Priestfield Stadium, on 19 August against Aldershot. Johnson made his debut, but Pulis was absent after being injured in a friendly. With injuries also ruling out Alan Walker, Tim O'Shea, and Brian Clarke, and further new signings not yet completed, Richardson was forced to select teenagers Ricky Pearson, Peter Beadle, Ivan Haines, Russell Norris, and Steve Thompson, the last two of whom were playing their first professional matches. The match finished in a goalless draw, as did the next league game away to Doncaster Rovers. Following a Football League inquiry, it was ruled that Gavin was now a Leicester player but that as a form of compensation he should return to Gillingham on loan for the duration of the 1989–90 season; he played for the first time since this ruling in the home game against Scunthorpe United, Gillingham's third league game of the season. Mike Trusson, a midfielder signed from Brighton & Hove Albion, made his debut in the same game. Gillingham lost the match 3–0, meaning that after three league games they were yet to score a goal in the Fourth Division. Peter Heritage, a forward signed from Hythe Town of the Southern League for a transfer fee of £30,000 (equivalent to £90,000 in 2023), made his debut against Scunthorpe; it was his first professional match at the age of nearly 29. The team's goalless run ended with a 2–1 win away to Hartlepool United on 9 September, Heritage scoring the winning goal, but the team then drew 0–0 with Burnley and lost 3–0 to Carlisle United. After six games, Gillingham were 18th of 24 teams in the league table.

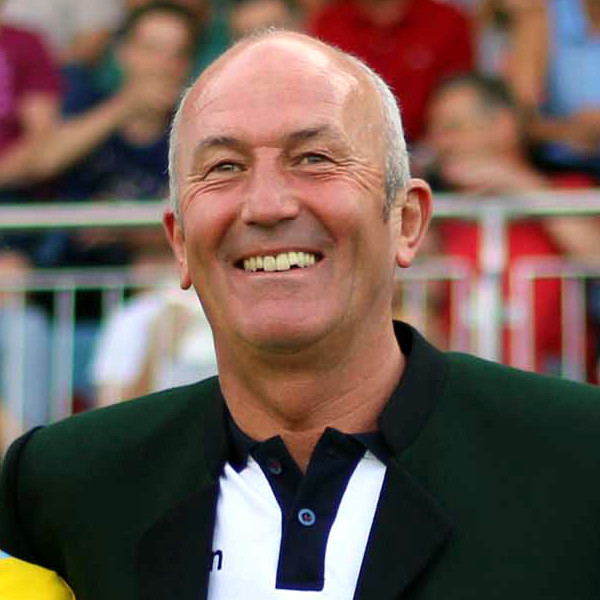
Tony Pulis (pictured in 2014) joined the club at the start of the season but did not make his debut until the final game of 1989.

Gillingham next played Southend United, who were top of the table and unbeaten. Having scored only two goals in the previous six league games, Gillingham won 5–0, the team's biggest win for two years. The next two games resulted in a 1–1 draw away to Peterborough United and a 1–0 win away to Halifax Town, Steve Lovell scoring both times, which took Gillingham up to 9th place. The team slipped back to 15th, however, after losing both their next two games without scoring a goal; captain Walker was absent for both games after being injured again. He returned to the team for a 3–0 win over Chesterfield on 21 October; Hillyard made his 618th appearance for Gillingham in that game, a new club record. It was the first of five consecutive league victories for the team; Gillingham ended October with a 1–0 win at home to Rochdale and won their first four league games of November, defeating Scarborough, Lincoln City, and Torquay United. The results took Gillingham up to 6th in the table, putting them in the promotion play-off places. The winning run came to an end with a 3–3 draw at home to Colchester United on 24 November, and Gillingham then lost in the Fourth Division for the first time in nearly two months when they were defeated 1–0 by York City on 9 December.

A week later, Mark O'Connor, a midfielder signed from AFC Bournemouth for £70,000 (equivalent to £220,000 in 2023), made his debut away to Exeter City; the game resulted in a second consecutive defeat. Ten days later, Gillingham played their first Football League match against near-neighbours Maidstone United, who had gained promotion from the Football Conference at the end of the previous season. Maidstone had competed in non-League football throughout their history, and such was the interest in the first Football League match between two teams from the county of Kent that the game drew an attendance of 10,412. It was Gillingham's largest home crowd for more than two years, and the start of the match had to be delayed to allow all the spectators into the stadium. Maidstone manager Keith Peacock had held the same post at Gillingham for six years until he was dismissed in 1987, a decision which led to public demonstrations by angry supporters, and he included five former Gillingham players in his team for the game. Maidstone took a two-goal lead in the second half and Mark Beeney, one of their former Gillingham players, saved a penalty kick from Lovell. Walker scored for Gillingham with two minutes remaining, colliding with the goalpost and knocking himself unconscious in the process, but Maidstone retained their lead and won the match. Pulis made his long-delayed debut in the team's final game of 1989, a 1–0 victory over Wrexham which took Gillingham up from 11th to 8th in the table, two points below the play-off places.

=== January–May ===
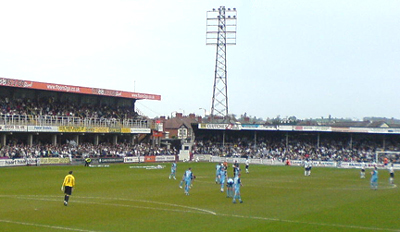
Gillingham's first game of 1990 was at Hereford United's Edgar Street stadium (pictured in 2008).

Gillingham began the new year with an away game against Hereford United on 1 January; having scored his first goal for the club two days earlier, Johnson scored his second in a 2–1 victory. They would prove to be the only two goals he scored in nearly 80 games with the club. The team achieved a second consecutive victory with a 3–1 win over Doncaster Rovers, after which they were once again in the play-off places. The last two league games of January resulted in a defeat to Aldershot and a draw with Hartlepool United, in both of which the team failed to score any goals; Lovell, the team's leading goalscorer, had scored only once in his last six league games. His first goal of 1990 gave Gillingham a 2–1 win over Burnley on 13 February to keep Gillingham 8th in the table; Pulis was substituted after being injured again and would miss the next four games.

Following the victory over Burnley, Gillingham failed to score in a further three matches, which resulted in two more goalless draws and a defeat away to Colchester United. The goalless run ended when Gillingham won 2–1 on 27 February against Carlisle United, who were top of the table going into the game. The result took Gillingham back up to 6th place, and they remained there after they began March with a 1–0 win at home to Cambridge United. Gavin, who had been restored to the starting line-up two games earlier after several games as a substitute, scored the only goal of the game in the first half; it would prove to be the only goal he scored in 39 matches during his loan spell. Following the victory, Gillingham were only two points below the three automatic promotion places and, although they once again failed to score in the next game against Peterborough United, another goalless draw reduced the gap to a single point. On 16 March, Gillingham beat Halifax Town 3–1 in a Friday evening game to climb to 3rd place, although after the next day's games they had fallen back to 6th. Following that victory, however, the team lost their next six games, a run during which they scored only a single goal in over nine hours of football. Beadle returned to the team as a substitute in the 2–0 defeat to Torquay United on 7 April; the teenaged forward had not played for the first team since the signing of Heritage, but was recalled from a loan spell at Margate following an injury to Trusson which would keep the midfielder out for the rest of the season. By the time Gillingham lost 1–0 to Hereford United on 14 April, their sixth consecutive defeat and fourth without scoring a goal, they had fallen to 14th in the table.

On 16 April, Gillingham played their away match with Maidstone, who were 4th in the table and challenging for promotion; the crowd of 5,003 was Maidstone's largest to date for a home league game. A goal from Heritage early in the first half gave Gillingham a victory over their rivals, which took Gillingham back up to 12th place. In the next game, Beadle's first professional goal secured a 1–1 draw against Exeter City, but this was followed by a defeat to Wrexham. In the last game of April, at home to Lincoln City, Gillingham were winning until the last minute of the game but then conceded an equalising goal. This left Gillingham nine points off 7th place and therefore, with two games remaining and a maximum of six points available, unable to finish in the play-off positions. Gillingham's last game of the season was away to Scarborough; Lovell scored the only goal of the match in the last 10 minutes to give his team victory, the third consecutive game in which he had scored. The result meant that Gillingham finished the season 14th in the Fourth Division, nine points below the play-off places.

=== Match details ===
Key

- In result column, Gillingham's score shown first
- H = Home match
- A = Away match
- pen. = Penalty kick
- o.g. = Own goal

Results

Date	Opponents	Result	Goalscorers	Attendance
19 August 1989	Aldershot (H)	0–0		3,670
26 August 1989	Doncaster Rovers (A)	0–0		1,887
2 September 1989	Scunthorpe United (H)	0–3		3,467
9 September 1989	Hartlepool United (A)	2–1	Palmer, Heritage	1,600
16 September 1989	Burnley (H)	0–0		3,853
23 September 1989	Carlisle United (A)	0–3		3,185
26 September 1989	Southend United (H)	5–0	Trusson, Lovell (2, 1 pen.), Eeles, Manuel	3,842
30 September 1989	Peterborough United (A)	1–1	Lovell	4,199
6 October 1989	Halifax Town (A)	1–0	Lovell	1,776
14 October 1989	Stockport County (H)	0–3		3,887
17 October 1989	Grimsby Town (A)	0–2		3,447
21 October 1989	Chesterfield (H)	3–0	Palmer, Lovell (2, 2 pens.)	2,878
31 October 1989	Rochdale (H)	1–0	Lovell	3,187
4 November 1989	Scarborough (H)	2–0	Haylock, Manuel	3,436
11 November 1989	Lincoln City (A)	3–1	Trusson, Heritage, Lovell	3,612
14 November 1989	Torquay United (A)	2–0	Heritage, Palmer	2,318
24 November 1989	Colchester United (H)	3–3	Heritage, Lovell (pen.), O'Shea	3,816
9 December 1989	York City (A)	0–1		2,134
16 December 1989	Exeter City (A)	1–3	Lovell (pen.)	3,818
26 December 1989	Maidstone United (H)	1–2	Walker	10,412
30 December 1989	Wrexham (H)	1–0	Johnson	3,733
1 January 1990	Hereford United (A)	2–1	Heritage, Johnson	2,759
13 January 1990	Doncaster Rovers (H)	3–1	Heritage, Brevett (o.g.), O'Connor	3,820
20 January 1990	Aldershot (A)	0–1		2,592
27 January 1990	Hartlepool United (H)	0–0		3,676
10 February 1990	Burnley (A)	2–1	Eeles, Lovell (pen.)	7,274
13 February 1990	Scunthorpe United (A)	0–0		2,226
17 February 1990	York City (H)	0–0		3,653
23 February 1990	Colchester United (A)	0–2		4,456
27 February 1990	Carlisle United (H)	2–1	Manuel, Heritage	3,177
3 March 1990	Cambridge United (H)	1–0	Gavin	4,210
6 March 1990	Peterborough United (H)	0–0		4,301
9 March 1990	Southend United (A)	0–2		4,460
16 March 1990	Halifax Town (H)	3–1	Lovell (pen.), O'Shea, Heritage	3,825
19 March 1990	Stockport County (A)	0–1		3,378
24 March 1990	Grimsby Town (H)	1–2	Lovell	4,150
31 March 1990	Chesterfield (A)	0–2		4,282
7 April 1990	Torquay United (H)	0–2		2,869
10 April 1990	Rochdale (A)	0–1		1,334
14 April 1990	Hereford United (H)	0–1		2,365
16 April 1990	Maidstone United (A)	1–0	Heritage	5,003
21 April 1990	Exeter City (H)	1–1	Beadle	3,374
24 April 1990	Wrexham (A)	1–2	Walker	3,498
28 April 1990	Lincoln City (H)	1–1	Lovell (pen.)	2,654
1 May 1990	Cambridge United (A)	1–2	Lovell	4,963
5 May 1990	Scarborough (A)	1–0	Lovell	1,807

=== Partial league table ===
Football League Fourth Division final table, positions 11 to 16
Pos	Team	Pld	W	D	L	GF	GA	GD	Pts
11	Scunthorpe United	46	17	15	14	69	54	+15	66
12	Rochdale	46	20	6	20	52	55	−3	66
13	York City	46	16	16	14	55	53	+2	64
14	Gillingham	46	17	11	18	46	48	−2	62
15	Torquay United	46	15	12	19	53	66	−13	57
16	Burnley	46	14	14	18	45	55	−10	56

== Cup matches ==
=== FA Cup ===
As a Fourth Division team, Gillingham entered the 1989–90 FA Cup in the first round, where they were drawn to play Welling United of the Football Conference. The initial match at Priestfield ended in a goalless draw, necessitating a replay four days later at Welling's Park View Road ground. A goal from Welling's Mark Hone in the first half was enough to give the semi-professional team victory and eliminate Gillingham from the FA Cup. It was the first time that Welling had beaten Football League opposition in the FA Cup in their history; Paul Newman of The Times described Gillingham's play in the second match as "ragged" and Welling manager Nicky Bridgen told the press "I wouldn't want to put Gillingham down but, to be honest, getting a draw on Saturday was no more difficult than drawing at somewhere like Telford in the Conference. We got what we deserved."

==== Match details ====
Key

- In result column, Gillingham's score shown first
- H = Home match
- A = Away match

Results

Date	Round	Opponents	Result	Goalscorers	Attendance
18 November 1989	First	Welling United (H)	0–0		5,598
22 November 1989	First	Welling United (A)	0–1		4,020

=== Football League Cup ===
As a Fourth Division team, Gillingham entered the 1989–90 Football League Cup in the first round and were paired with Leyton Orient of the Third Division. Gillingham lost the first leg of the two-legged tie 4–1 at Priestfield and the second 3–0 at Orient's Brisbane Road ground and were eliminated from the competition by an aggregate score of 7–1.

==== Match details ====
Key

- In result column, Gillingham's score shown first
- H = Home match
- A = Away match

Results

Date	Round	Opponents	Result	Goalscorers	Attendance
22 August 1989	First	Leyton Orient (H)	1–4	Lovell	3,258
29 August 1989	First	Leyton Orient (A)	0–3		2,818

=== Associate Members' Cup ===
The 1989–90 Associate Members' Cup, a tournament exclusively for Third and Fourth Division teams, began with a preliminary round in which the teams were drawn into groups of three, contested on a round-robin basis. Gillingham's group also included fellow Fourth Division teams Southend United and Cambridge United. In the first match of the group, Southend defeated Gillingham 1–0. Three weeks later, Gillingham beat Cambridge 2–0 at Priestfield; goalkeeper Harvey Lim, who had recently joined the club as back-up to Hillyard after a spell playing in Sweden, made his debut. The match drew an attendance of 1,044, the lowest of the season at Priestfield. The final match of the group resulted in a draw between Southend and Cambridge, meaning that Gillingham finished second in the group and progressed to the first round proper. Their opponents were Bristol Rovers of the Third Division, who won 1–0 to end Gillingham's participation in the competition.

==== Match details ====
Key

- In result column, Gillingham's score shown first
- H = Home match
- A = Away match

Results

Date	Round	Opponents	Result	Goalscorers	Attendance
7 November 1989	Group stage	Southend United (A)	0–1		1,650
28 November 1989	Group stage	Cambridge United (H)	2–0	Lovell, Walker	1,044
24 January 1990	First	Bristol Rovers (A)	0–1		2,724

== Players ==
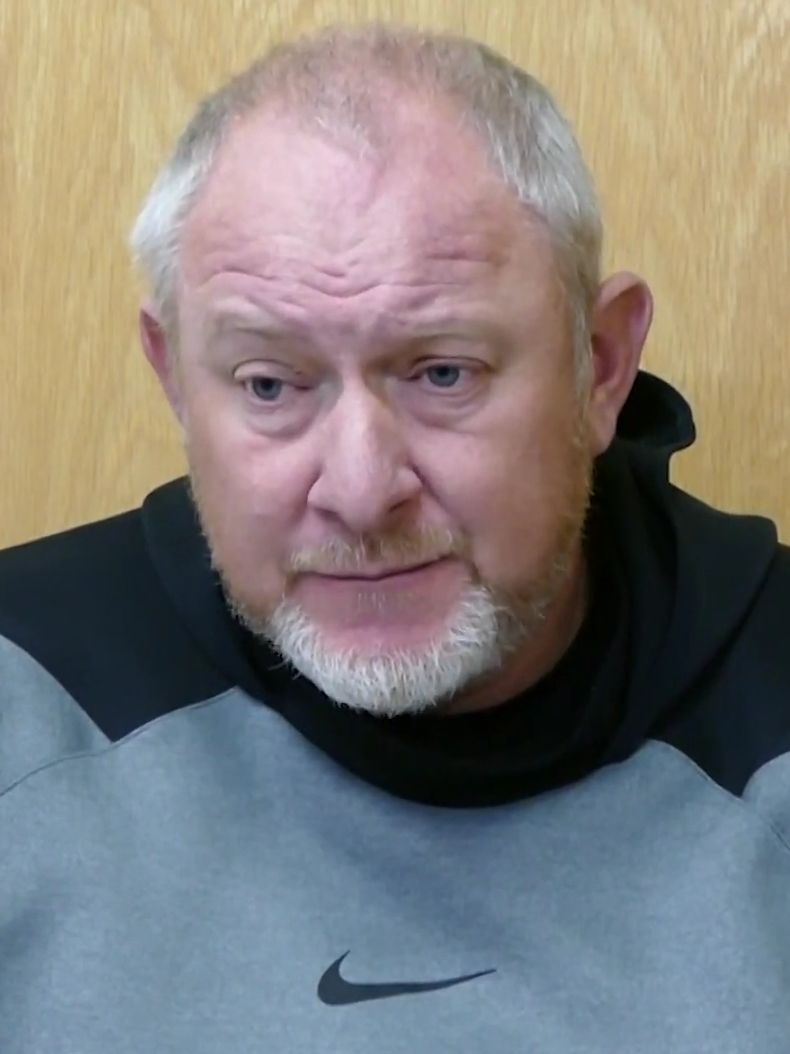
Peter Beadle (pictured in 2020) made 10 appearances.

Twenty-six players made at least one appearance for Gillingham during the season. Johnson and Paul Haylock made the most; each made a total of 51 appearances in all competitions. Haylock missed only two league games, whereas Johnson was absent for only one Fourth Division game and one in the Associate Members' Cup. Six other players made 40 or more appearances: Heritage, Hillyard, Lovell, O'Shea, Lee Palmer, and Walker. Gary Smith made the fewest appearances, playing only twice, both times as a substitute. The two games would prove to be the entirety of his professional career.

Thirteen players scored at least one goal during the season. Lovell was the team's top scorer for the third consecutive season; he scored 16 goals in Fourth Division matches and a total of 18 in all competitions. Heritage was the second highest-scoring player, with a total of 9 goals; no other player scored more than three times.

Player statistics
Player	Position	Fourth Division		FA Cup		League Cup		Associate Members' Cup		Total	
Player	Position	Apps	Goals	Apps	Goals	Apps	Goals	Apps	Goals	Apps	Goals
Peter Beadle	FW	10	1	0	0	2	0	0	0	12	1
Brian Clarke	DF	3	0	0	0	0	0	0	0	3	0
Ian Docker	MF	20	0	1	0	0	0	2	0	23	0
Tony Eeles	MF	33	2	1	0	2	0	2	0	38	2
Pat Gavin	FW	34	1	2	0	0	0	3	0	39	1
Ivan Haines	DF	26	0	2	0	2	0	1	0	31	0
Paul Haylock	DF	44	1	2	0	2	0	3	0	51	1
Peter Heritage	FW	42	9	2	0	0	0	3	0	47	9
Ron Hillyard	GK	42	0	2	0	2	0	1	0	47	0
Peter Johnson	DF	45	2	2	0	2	0	2	0	51	2
Francis Joseph	FW	3	0	0	0	2	0	0	0	5	0
Garry Kimble	DF	14	0	0	0	0	0	0	0	14	0
Harvey Lim	GK	4	0	0	0	0	0	2	0	6	0
Steve Lovell	FW	41	16	2	0	2	1	3	1	48	18
Billy Manuel	MF	32	3	2	0	1	0	3	0	38	3
Russell Norris	DF	5	0	0	0	2	0	0	0	7	0
Mark O'Connor	MF	15	1	0	0	0	0	1	0	16	1
Tim O'Shea	DF	36	2	1	0	0	0	3	0	40	2
Lee Palmer	DF	39	3	2	0	2	0	3	0	46	3
Ricky Pearson	DF	6	0	0	0	2	0	0	0	8	0
Brendan Place	DF	4	0	2	0	0	0	2	0	8	0
Tony Pulis	DF	16	0	0	0	0	0	1	0	17	0
Gary Smith	MF	1	0	0	0	1	0	0	0	2	0
Steve Thompson	DF	2	0	0	0	2	0	0	0	4	0
Mike Trusson	DF	25	2	2	0	0	0	1	0	28	2
Alan Walker	DF	38	2	0	0	0	0	2	1	40	3

== Aftermath ==
In his final programme notes of the season, Richardson wrote that in his opinion the team would have been promoted had it not been for the number of injuries suffered by key players; he stated that injuries impacted his team selection for around 70 per cent of the season's matches and said that on some occasions he had as few as 13 players available for team selection. In the 1990–91 season, Gillingham's form was again inconsistent; following a lengthy unbeaten run in the first half of the season the team were in contention for the play-offs but ultimately finished 15th in the Fourth Division after failing to win in 10 consecutive games in the last two months of the season. Gillingham eventually achieved promotion back to the third tier of English football in 1996, ending a spell of seven seasons at the lower level.
