= 1990–91 Gillingham F.C. season =

English football club season

Gillingham
1990–91 season
- Chairman: M.G. Lukehurst
- Manager: Damien Richardson
- Fourth Division: 15th
- FA Cup: First round
- League Cup: First round
- Associate Members' Cup: First round
- Top goalscorer: League: Steve Lovell (19); All: Steve Lovell (21)
- Highest home attendance: 8,004 vs Maidstone United (22 September 1990)
- Lowest home attendance: 1,455 vs Hereford United (8 January 1991)
Home colours	Away colours

During the 1990–91 English football season, Gillingham F.C. competed in the Football League Fourth Division, the fourth tier of the English football league system. It was the 59th season in which Gillingham competed in the Football League, and the 41st since the club was voted back into the league in 1950. Early in the season, Ron Hillyard, the club's long-serving goalkeeper, ended his playing career with a club record number of appearances. Gillingham's form was inconsistent in the first half of the season; after falling to 17th in the league table, the team began a lengthy unbeaten run and were 10th at the end of 1990. Around the end of March, Peter Beadle and David Crown, two of the team's regular starting forwards, were injured and both missed most of the remainder of the season. The team went 10 consecutive games without winning between the last game of March and the first of May and finished the season 15th in the Fourth Division.

Gillingham also competed in three knock-out competitions. The team were eliminated in the first round of both the FA Cup and Football League Cup. Gillingham progressed from the initial group stage of the Associate Members' Cup but lost in the first round proper. The team played a total of 52 competitive matches, winning 14, drawing 19 and losing 19. Steve Lovell was the team's top goalscorer, with 19 in the Fourth Division and 21 in all competitions. He also made the most appearances, playing in every match. The highest attendance recorded at the club's home ground, Priestfield Stadium, was 8,004, for a game against local rivals Maidstone United.

== Background and pre-season ==
The 1990–91 season was Gillingham's 59th season playing in the Football League and the 41st since the club was elected back into the League in 1950 after being voted out in 1938. It was the club's second consecutive season in the Football League Fourth Division, the fourth tier of the English football league system. In the previous season, the first since being relegated from the Third Division, Gillingham had finished 14th out of 24 teams.

At the start of the season, Damien Richardson was the club's manager, a post he had held since April 1989. His assistant manager was Ron Hillyard, who was also the club's first-choice starting goalkeeper at the start of the season. Alan Walker was the team captain. Richardson signed only one new player ahead of the new season: David Crown, a 32-year old forward who had played nearly 400 Football League games and scored over 120 goals, joined from Southend United for a transfer fee of £50,000 (equivalent to £140,000 in 2023). Veteran defender Paul Haylock was among several players released by the club; after playing nearly 200 games for Gillingham he joined their local rivals Maidstone United.

The club adopted a new kit design, adding a pattern of white diagonal stripes of varying thicknesses and vertical shadow stripes to the team's traditional blue shirts. As the shirts were cut from large bolts of fabric, the exact pattern of stripes varied from shirt to shirt, something which also occurred with some other unusually-patterned kits of the era. The away kit, to be worn in the event of a clash of colours with the home team, was all red. The team prepared for the new season with a number of friendly matches, including a 1–0 defeat at home to Ipswich Town and a 4–1 defeat at home to West Ham United, both of the Second Division, as well as a goalless draw with the Australian Olympic team, who were undertaking a tour of Europe.

== Fourth Division ==
=== August–December ===
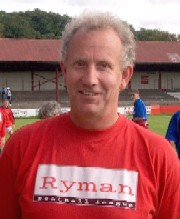
Ron Hillyard (pictured in 2001) played his final game for Gillingham in September, ending his career with a record number of appearances for the club.

Gillingham's first match of the season was at their home ground, Priestfield Stadium, against Darlington. Crown did not make his debut as he had been injured in a friendly; Peter Heritage and Steve Lovell were the starting forwards. Lovell scored the only goal from a penalty kick in a 1–0 victory, during which Gillingham's Billy Manuel was sent off for violent conduct. Lovell also scored in the next three league games, including twice in a 3–0 win at home to Hartlepool United on 8 September, giving him a total of five league goals in the first four games. On 15 September, Hillyard made his final appearance for Gillingham in a 2–1 defeat away to Scarborough, injuries bringing an end to a playing career with the club which had begun in 1974. His total of 563 Football League games for Gillingham fell short of fellow goalkeeper John Simpson's record of 571 but Hillyard ended his career with a club record total of 655 games for the club across all competitions. Harvey Lim, who had served as back-up to Hillyard during the previous season, replaced him in goal for the next game against Hereford United, and played every game during the remainder of the season apart from a three-match spell in March when he was suspended after being sent off.

Crown made his debut in the sixth league game of the season when he came on as a substitute in a home game against Maidstone United on 22 September; the game between the two Kent-based clubs drew an attendance of 8,004, Gillingham's largest home crowd of the season. Maidstone, who had only gained promotion from non-League football in 1989, won 2–0, meaning that they had beaten Gillingham at Priestfield in both seasons since they had entered the Football League. Three days later, David McDonald, a teenaged defender signed on loan from Tottenham Hotspur of the Football League First Division after an injury to Joe Dunne, made his debut in a 1–1 draw against York City; Ian Docker scored his first goal for Gillingham after more than 50 games for the team. Gillingham ended the month 14th in the league table. Lovell scored twice in both of the team's first two games in October, a 2–1 win over Carlisle United and a 2–2 draw with Rochdale, taking his league goals total to nine in nine games; after the game manager Richardson told the press that Lovell "personifies everything that is good about the game. People talk about his goals but his play has been superb this season. He has taken the role of leader and I think he has reached his peak." In the next eight matches, however, Lovell scored only twice. Crown made his first appearance in the starting line-up on 20 October against Blackpool. That game resulted in the second of three defeats for the team in the final four games of October, leaving them 17th in the table.

On 9 November Gillingham won for the first time in five weeks with a 2–1 victory over Halifax Town; Crown scored the opening goal, his first for the club. The team followed this up with a 4–0 win over Cardiff City, their biggest victory of the season so far, and the first time Gillingham had scored four or more goals in a game since September 1989. On 15 December, Gillingham extended their unbeaten league run to five games by beating Burnley 3–2 with three goals from Crown in the first 27 minutes of the game; it was the first time a Gillingham player had scored a hat-trick in the first half of a game since 1973. The team's final game of 1990 was a goalless draw at home to Northampton Town; Gillingham ended the year 10th in the Fourth Division, three points below the promotion play-off places.

=== January–May ===
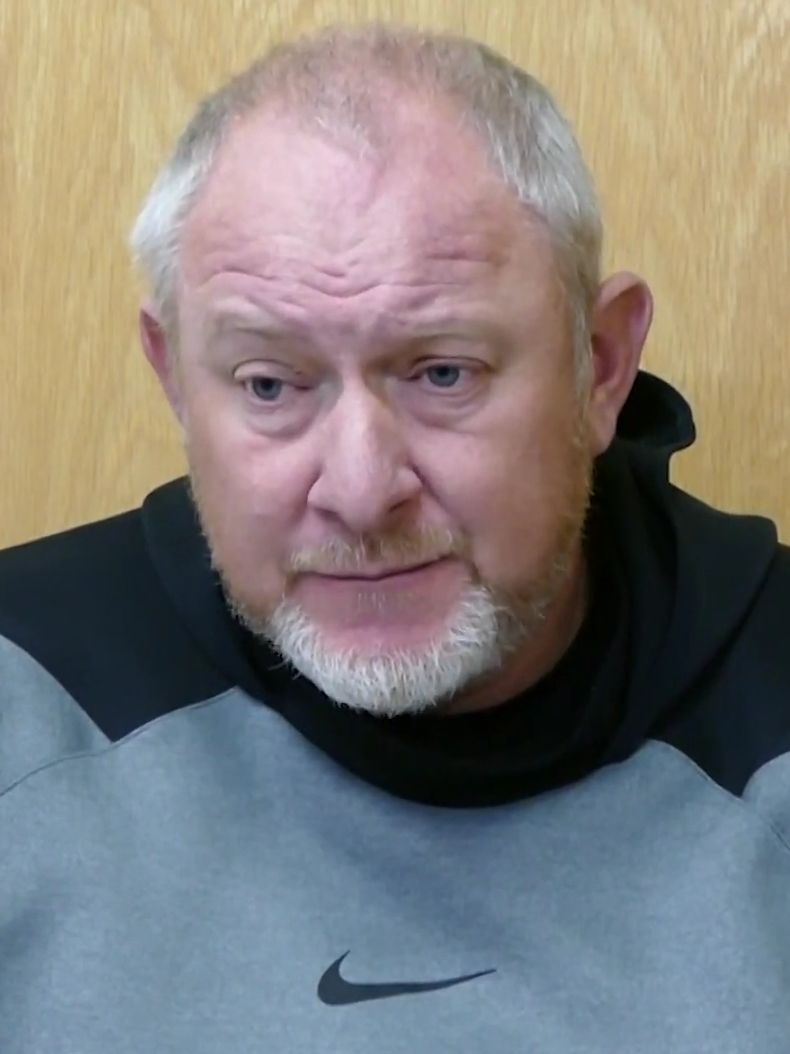
Peter Beadle (pictured in 2020) became a first-team regular in the second half of the season.

Gillingham's first match of the new year ended in a 1–1 draw away to Stockport County on 1 January with a goal from 18-year-old forward Peter Beadle, who had played intermittently in the first half of the season, mainly as a substitute. The team played three further league matches in January and drew them all, extending their unbeaten run to twelve games. They only won four of the twelve matches, however, and by the end of January had dropped to 12th in the league table. The last of the four consecutive draws was away to Darlington on 29 January, a game in which Darlington had two players sent off and the referee was hit in the face by an apple thrown from the crowd. Four days later, Gillingham achieved their first Fourth Division win of 1991, a 2–1 victory over Hereford United. The next game resulted in a 2–0 defeat to Cardiff City on 15 February, ending an unbeaten league run stretching back to October; Lim was sent off during the defeat, leading to midfielder Docker taking over in goal. As this resulted in Lim serving a three-match suspension, Richardson signed goalkeeper Peter Gleasure on loan from Northampton Town to cover his absence.

Following the defeat to Cardiff, Gillingham beat Halifax Town 1–0, but then lost the next two games, falling to 14th in the table. Paul Hague, a teenaged defender, made his debut away to Carlisle United on 12 March, a game which Gillingham won 4–0, the team's biggest away win since 1968. Beadle scored twice; Crown and Lovell scored the other goals. Lovell was by now playing in a midfield role with Beadle and Crown starting in the forward positions. Gillingham drew their next two games but then beat Rochdale 3–1, Beadle again scoring twice. Both of Gillingham's first-choice forwards were missing from the team for most of the latter stages of the season due to injury. Beadle played his last game of the season against Walsall on 30 March; two days later Crown was substituted against Lincoln City and would not play again until the penultimate match of the season more than a month later. Crown's replacement against Lincoln was Adrian Owers, a midfielder newly signed on loan from Brighton & Hove Albion for the remainder of the season. With two of his key forwards missing, Richardson moved Mike Trusson, usually a midfielder, into an attacking role. When questioned as to why he did not move Lovell, still the team's leading goalscorer, back into a forward position, Richardson told the press "he is not a centre-forward but would have been expected to fulfill the centre-forward's role [...] In my opinion he is best left where he is at the moment."

Gillingham played eight matches in April and failed to win any, achieving only two draws and losing the other six; by the end of the month they were 16th in the table. Tony Butler, another teenaged defender, made his debut in a 2–2 draw against Blackpool on 20 April and retained his place in the team for the remainder of the season; he went on to play 180 games for the club. He was one of three defenders aged 18 or under in the team for the game against Blackpool, along with Hague, who returned to the starting line-up having been absent for a month, and Richard Carpenter. Four days later Gillingham were defeated again by Maidstone, losing 3–1 at Watling Street. Gillingham's winless run extended to ten games with three defeats in which they failed to score any goals, culminating on 4 May with a 3–0 loss away to Wrexham, who were bottom of the division. The run finally ended in the last match of the season at home to Doncaster Rovers when goals from Mark O'Connor and Lovell gave Gillingham a 2–0 victory. The team finished the season in 15th place in the Fourth Division with 54 points, 18 points below the promotion play-off places and 14 above 24th-placed Wrexham.

=== Match details ===
Key

- In result column, Gillingham's score shown first
- H = Home match
- A = Away match
- pen. = Penalty kick
- o.g. = Own goal

Results

Date	Opponents	Result	Goalscorers	Attendance
25 August 1990	Darlington (H)	1–0	Lovell (pen.)	3,730
31 August 1990	Torquay United (A)	1–3	Lovell (pen.)	3,072
8 September 1990	Hartlepool United (H)	3–0	Lovell (2), Heritage	3,155
15 September 1990	Scarborough (A)	1–2	Lovell	1,499
19 September 1990	Hereford United (A)	1–1	Heritage	2,632
22 September 1990	Maidstone United (H)	0–2		8,004
29 September 1990	York City (A)	1–1	Docker	2,259
2 October 1990	Carlisle United (H)	2–1	Lovell (2, 1 pen.)	3,022
6 October 1990	Rochdale (H)	2–2	Lovell (2)	3,316
13 October 1990	Scunthorpe United (A)	0–1		2,357
20 October 1990	Blackpool (A)	0–2		3,041
23 October 1990	Aldershot (H)	1–1	Walker	3,140
27 October 1990	Wrexham (H)	2–3	Docker, Carpenter	3,077
3 November 1990	Doncaster Rovers (A)	1–1	Lovell	2,502
9 November 1990	Halifax Town (A)	2–1	Crown, Trusson	1,708
24 November 1990	Cardiff City (H)	4–0	O'Connor, Crown, Walker, Docker	2,793
1 December 1990	Chesterfield (A)	1–1	Lovell	3,468
15 December 1990	Burnley (H)	3–2	Crown (3)	3,687
22 December 1990	Lincoln City (A)	1–1	Lovell	2,685
26 December 1990	Walsall (H)	1–0	Lovell	3,695
29 December 1990	Northampton Town (H)	0–0		4,934
1 January 1991	Stockport County (A)	1–1	Beadle	2,859
11 January 1991	Torquay United (H)	2–2	Crown, Uzzell (o.g.)	4,329
25 January 1991	Scarborough (H)	1–1	Beadle	3,756
29 January 1991	Darlington (A)	1–1	Crown	2,882
2 February 1991	Hereford United (H)	2–1	Walker, O'Connor	3,223
15 February 1991	Cardiff City (A)	0–2		2,170
22 February 1991	Halifax Town (H)	1–0	Crown	2,829
26 February 1991	Peterborough United (H)	2–3	Trusson, Beadle	3,088
2 March 1991	Chesterfield (H)	0–1		3,095
9 March 1991	Burnley (A)	2–2	Lovell, Crown	6,459
12 March 1991	Carlisle United (A)	4–0	Beadle (2), Lovell, Crown	2,633
16 March 1991	York City (H)	0–0		3,056
19 March 1991	Scunthorpe United (H)	1–1	Trusson (pen.)	2,324
23 March 1991	Rochdale (A)	3–1	Beadle (2), Crown	1,654
30 March 1991	Walsall (A)	0–0		3,074
1 April 1991	Lincoln City (H)	2–2	Crown, Walker	3,765
6 April 1991	Northampton Town (A)	1–2	Trusson (pen.)	2,993
13 April 1991	Stockport County (H)	1–3	Lovell	3,001
16 April 1991	Peterborough United (A)	0–2		5,831
20 April 1991	Blackpool (H)	2–2	Palmer, Lovell	3,025
24 April 1991	Maidstone United (A)	1–3	Lovell	2,935
27 April 1991	Aldershot (A)	0–1		2,089
30 April 1991	Hartlepool United (A)	0–1		3,782
4 May 1991	Wrexham (A)	0–3		1,231
11 May 1991	Doncaster Rovers (H)	2–0	O'Connor, Lovell	2,653

=== Partial league table ===
Football League Fourth Division final table, positions 13 to 17
Pos	Team	Pld	W	D	L	GF	GA	GD	Pts
13	Cardiff City	46	15	15	16	43	54	−11	60
14	Lincoln City	46	14	17	15	50	61	−11	59
15	Gillingham	45	12	18	15	57	60	−3	54
16	Walsall	46	12	17	17	48	51	−3	53
17	Hereford United	46	13	14	19	53	58	−5	53

== Cup matches ==
=== FA Cup ===
As a Fourth Division team, Gillingham entered the 1990–91 FA Cup in the first round and were paired with AFC Bournemouth of the Third Division; the match took place 11 days after the teams had met in the Associate Members' Cup. Gillingham lost 2–1 and were eliminated from the competition.

==== Match details ====
Key

- In result column, Gillingham's score shown first
- H = Home match
- A = Away match
- pen. = Penalty kick
- o.g. = Own goal

Results

Date	Round	Opponents	Result	Goalscorers	Attendance
17 November 1990	First	AFC Bournemouth (A)	1–2	Crown	6,113

=== Football League Cup ===
Gillingham entered the 1990–91 Football League Cup in the first round and their opponents were Shrewsbury Town of the Third Division. It was a two-legged tie, with the first leg at Priestfield where Lovell scored the only goal as Gillingham defeated their higher-level opponents. A week later, however, Shrewsbury won the second leg 2–0 at their Gay Meadow ground and thus won the tie by an aggregate score of 2–1, ending Gillingham's participation in the League Cup.

==== Match details ====
Key

- In result column, Gillingham's score shown first
- H = Home match
- A = Away match
- pen. = Penalty kick
- o.g. = Own goal

Results

Date	Round	Opponents	Result	Goalscorers	Attendance
28 August 1990	First (first leg)	Shrewsbury Town (H)	1–0	Lovell	2,613
4 September 1990	First (second leg)	Shrewsbury Town (A)	0–2		2,193

=== Associate Members' Cup ===
The 1990–91 Associate Members' Cup, a tournament exclusively for Third and Fourth Division teams, began with a preliminary round in which the teams were drawn into groups of three, contested on a round-robin basis; Gillingham's group included AFC Bournemouth and Maidstone United. Gillingham's first game was away to Bournemouth and resulted in a 0–0 draw. Three weeks later Gillingham defeated Maidstone 4–1 at home; the result meant that they finished second in the group and qualified for the first round proper, in which their opponents were fellow Fourth Division team Hereford United. In front of a crowd of 1,455, the lowest of the season at Priestfield, Gillingham lost the match 1–0 and were eliminated from the competition.

==== Match details ====
Key

- In result column, Gillingham's score shown first
- H = Home match
- A = Away match
- pen. = Penalty kick
- o.g. = Own goal

Results

Date	Round	Opponents	Result	Goalscorers	Attendance
6 November 1990	Group stage	AFC Bournemouth (A)	0–0		2,784
27 November 1990	Group stage	Maidstone United (H)	4–1	Walker (2), Crown, Lovell	3,852
8 January 1991	First	Hereford United (H)	0–1		1,455

== Players ==
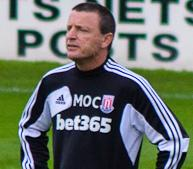
Mark O'Connor (pictured in 2013) was one of six players to make over 40 appearances during the season.

Twenty-eight players made at least one appearance for Gillingham during the season; Lovell made the most, playing in all 52 games. Walker, O'Connor, Trusson, Lim and Manuel all played more than 40 times. Lim was named the club's player of the year. Gary West, who had a brief loan spell with the club, and teenagers Dave Jordan and Mark Dempsey, who both made their professional debut during the season, tied for the fewest games played, each making only 2 appearances. Dempsey went on to make over 50 appearances for the club, but Jordan left without playing again and dropped into non-League football.

Ten players scored at least one goal for the team. Lovell was the leading goalscorer, with 19 goals in the Fourth Division, 1 in the League Cup and 1 in the Associate Members' Cup for a total of 21 in all competitions. It was the fourth consecutive season in which he was the team's top scorer. Crown was the only other player to reach double figures, scoring 12 times in the league and 14 times in all competitions.

Player statistics
Player	Position	Fourth Division		FA Cup		League Cup		Associate Members' Cup		Total	
Player	Position	Apps	Goals	Apps	Goals	Apps	Goals	Apps	Goals	Apps	Goals
Peter Beadle	FW	22	7	0	0	2	0	1	0	25	7
Tony Butler	DF	6	0	0	0	0	0	0	0	6	0
Richard Carpenter	DF	9	1	0	0	0	0	0	0	9	1
Brian Clarke	DF	20	0	1	0	0	0	3	0	24	0
David Crown	FW	30	12	1	1	0	0	3	1	34	14
Mark Dempsey	MF	2	0	0	0	0	0	0	0	2	0
Ian Docker	MF	31	3	1	0	1	0	3	0	36	3
Joe Dunne	DF	26	0	1	0	2	0	3	0	32	0
Tony Eeles	MF	6	0	0	0	0	0	1	0	7	0
Peter Gleasure	GK	3	0	0	0	0	0	0	0	3	0
Paul Hague	DF	7	0	0	0	0	0	0	0	7	0
Ivan Haines	DF	12	0	0	0	2	0	0	0	14	0
Mike Harle	DF	2	0	0	0	0	0	1	0	3	0
Peter Heritage	FW	15	2	1	0	2	0	1	0	19	2
Ron Hillyard	GK	4	0	0	0	2	0	0	0	6	0
Peter Johnson	DF	24	0	0	0	2	0	1	0	27	0
Dave Jordan	FW	2	0	0	0	0	0	0	0	2	0
Garry Kimble	MF	34	0	1	0	1	0	1	0	37	0
Harvey Lim	GK	39	0	1	0	0	0	3	0	43	0
Steve Lovell	FW	46	19	1	0	2	1	3	1	52	21
Billy Manuel	MF	38	0	1	0	1	0	2	0	42	0
David McDonald	DF	10	0	0	0	0	0	2	0	12	0
Mark O'Connor	MF	41	3	1	0	2	0	2	0	46	3
Tim O'Shea	DF	29	0	0	0	1	0	2	0	32	0
Adrian Owers	MF	10	0	0	0	0	0	0	0	10	0
Lee Palmer	DF	21	1	0	0	2	0	0	0	23	1
Mike Trusson	MF	39	4	1	0	2	0	3	0	45	4
Alan Walker	DF	44	4	1	0	2	0	2	2	49	6
Gary West	DF	1	0	0	0	0	0	1	0	2	0

FW = Forward, MF = Midfielder, GK = Goalkeeper, DF = Defender

== Aftermath ==
Writing in the programme for the final match of the season, the club's chief executive, Barry Bright, expressed "abject disappointment" at the team's failure to achieve promotion, blaming injuries to key players and the fact that too many games resulted in draws. Most of the team's regular starters remained at the club for the following season, although Manuel moved to Brentford for £60,000 (equivalent to £170,000 in 2023). In the 1991–92 season, Gillingham again spent most of the season in mid-table, finishing 11th. The team would eventually achieve promotion back to the third tier of English football in 1996, ending a spell of seven seasons at the lower level.
