= Maidstone United F.C. =

Football club in Kent, England

Coordinates: 51°16′48″N 0°30′57″E

Maidstone United
- Full name: Maidstone United Football Club
- Nickname: The Stones
- Founded: 1992; 34 years ago as Maidstone Invicta
- Ground: Gallagher Stadium
- Capacity: 4,200 (792 seated)
- Owners: TBD
- Chief Executive: Bill Williams
- Manager: Craig Fagan
- League: National League South
- 2025–26: National League South, 8th of 24
- Website: maidstoneunited.co.uk
Home colours	Away colours

Maidstone United Football Club is a professional football club based in Maidstone, Kent, England. The team competes in the National League South, the sixth level of the English football league system. The club's nickname is "The Stones" and they play in black and amber.

Maidstone United was a member of The Football League between 1989 and 1992. That club was forced out of the league following bankruptcy, but the nucleus of a new club was built around the youth squad, Maidstone Invicta, which made the step up to adult football in 1992 after being elected to the Kent County League Fourth Division in 1993 and subsequently progressed through the non-League pyramid. They changed their name to Maidstone United in 1995. They played in the Isthmian League Premier Division from 2013, having been promoted from the Isthmian League Division One South, and won the league in the 2014–15 season to gain promotion to the National League South (formerly the Conference South) for the 2015–16 season.

Maidstone gained a second successive promotion to the National League in 2016, bringing fifth-tier football back to the town for the first time since the old club was promoted to the Football League in 1989. Maidstone were relegated in 2019, before winning the National League South title in 2022 and promotion back to the National League. However, they could not consolidate this position and were relegated the following season. In 2023–24, Maidstone reached the fifth round of the FA Cup for the first time, becoming the first team outside of the top five divisions to reach this stage since 1977–78. Maidstone were without a stadium of their own from their creation until 2012 when the Gallagher Stadium near Maidstone town centre opened at the start of the 2012–13 season.

== History ==
Chart of Maidstone United league performance.

=== 1992–2001: The new club and Kent County League years ===
Maidstone Invicta were originally a youth club and were "taken over" within days of the Football League side folding. However, the lack of a suitable ground meant the club was effectively relegated seven divisions to the basement of the footballing pyramid and joined the Fourth Division of the Kent County League for the 1993–94 season. The club's home games took place on the reserve and training pitch of the original Maidstone, next to the original London Road Stadium. Initially, Jim Thompson ran the club, but was banned from football for his part in the demise of Maidstone and Dartford, and Paul Bowden-Brown took over as Chairman – a position he retained until 2010.

The newly created Kent County League side was formed with the nucleus of the original club's youth team, They had been formed too late to join a league for the 1992–93 season, but, in the 1993–94 season, comfortably won the Fourth Division of the County League under the stewardship of Jack Whitely and Bill Tucker. They also managed to win the West Kent Challenge Shield and the Tunbridge Wells Charity Cup. During the close season of 1994 the club managed to gain promotion to Division 2 of the league after restructuring. The club went on to win Division 2, picking up the Kent Junior Cup on the way. However, the Stones, who had adopted their original name of Maidstone United in 1997, took four years and six managers before finally winning promotion to the Kent County League Premier Division with former Stones player turned manager Jason Lillis leading the club to the Division One title. The 1999–2000 season saw Maidstone's début season in the Premier Division, with the team finishing in a respectable third place. The next season saw the club, which was now managed by another former Maidstonian in Matt Toms, successfully apply to become a senior club and finish second in the league. These factors now left the door open to seek elevation to the Kent League (with the County League being a step-7 league and the Kent League being a step-5 league, direct promotion was not possible).

=== 2001–2006: The Kent League years ===
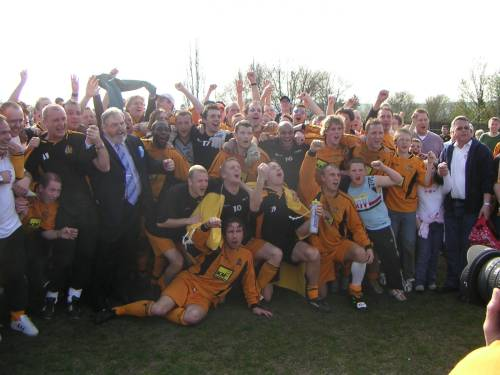
Maidstone win the Kent League title for the second time

The club's application was accepted and the Stones started the 2001–2002 season in the Kent League. However, the club's ground in Maidstone was nowhere near Kent League standards so the Stones agreed to share Sittingbourne's Central Park stadium while trying to overcome various legal obstacles in the way of a move to a new ground in the town at James Whatman Way. In its first Kent League season since reformation, Maidstone won the Kent League and Cup double under the management of Jim Ward. However, the club could not gain promotion to the Southern League Eastern Division because of problems with the lease on Central Park. The lease problems were not solved and during the 2002 close season both Sittingbourne and Maidstone moved out of Central Park to a new ground, named Bourne Park, which was built on the same complex using the old training pitch.

The 2002–03 season saw Maidstone enter the FA Cup for the first time since reformation, and the club was featured on BBC Sport's 'Road to Cardiff'. The club reached the 2nd qualifying round of the cup, with the highlight of the run coming in the form of a 3–2 win against old foes Tonbridge Angels, with Steve Butler bagging a hat-trick against the Southern League East outfit. In the league, the Stones looked destined to win a second successive title but after a poor run-in, coupled with the withdrawal from the league of Faversham Town, the club bizarrely lost the championship by 0.14 of a point (the League Management Committee decreed that the title would be awarded to the club with the highest earned points per match average, so with Maidstone and Thamesmead Town achieving 63 points from 30 games, the unusual situation arose that the championship was won by Cray Wanderers with 62 points from 29 games). The Stones did pick up some silverware that season, winning both the Kent Senior Trophy and the Kent Charity Cup, but this was overshadowed by continuing lease problems, which meant another attempt to gain promotion to the Southern League was knocked back.

The years 2003 till 2005 contained two indifferent seasons for the Stones, on the pitch at least. Both campaigns saw the club finish 4th in the league, although this disappointment was offset somewhat by reaching the third qualifying round of the FA Cup in successive years. Off the pitch, the club took a huge step forward when in November 2004 it successfully applied for planning permission to build a new stadium at James Whatman Way. However, construction of the stadium could not begin until a lease for the site was agreed with its owners, the Ministry of Defence. The 2005–06 season saw Maidstone, now managed by Lloyd Hume after a spell in charge from Mal Watkins, win the Kent League title. They spent the season toe-to-toe with Beckenham Town before securing the championship on the final day of the season. The title win meant the club finally gained promotion to Step 4 of the non league pyramid, joining the Isthmian League Division One South. However perhaps more importantly, the club's bid to return to Maidstone was another step closer when a 99-year lease was signed for the land at James Whatman Way, meaning the club was now free to start building on it.

=== 2006–2015: The Isthmian League years ===
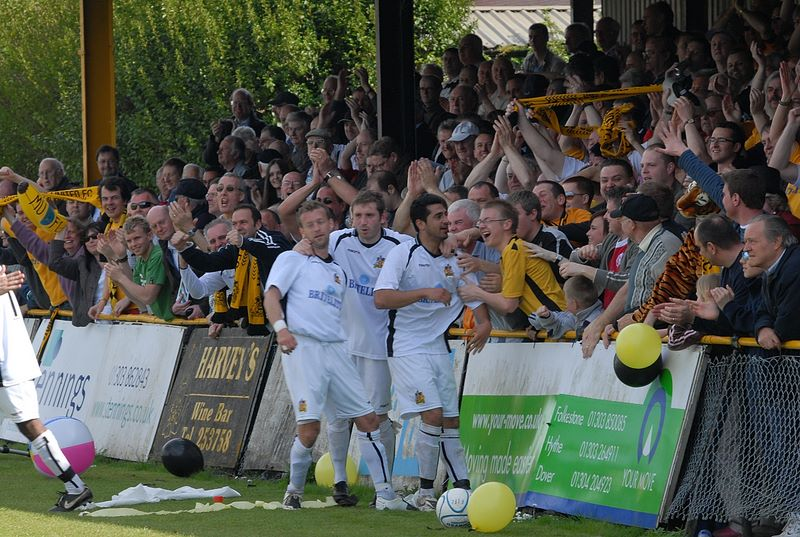
Mo Takaloo celebrates his goal which saves Maidstone from relegation at Folkestone Invicta

Maidstone, who were now managed by Lloyd Hume and Alan Walker in a joint capacity, surprisingly managed to win the league at the first time of asking, gaining promotion to the Isthmian League Premier Division. However the overwhelming success on the pitch was overshadowed by little visible progress being made in the building of the stadium at James Whatman Way. Before the 2007–08 season had even begun Alan Walker was involved in a freak accident at a coaching course in Belfast which left him temporarily paralysed. Walker made a valiant recovery however, and was back walking and in management by the start of the league season. Maidstone struggled in the new surroundings of the Isthmian League Premier Division and spent the majority of the season near the foot of the table, despite having the services of Chris Smalling at their disposal, however they avoided relegation after beating Folkestone Invicta 1–0 on the last day of the season, a result that relegated Invicta in Maidstone's place. In other news 25% of the club was sold to businessman Oliver Ash in February 2008.

The 2008–09 was another tough season for Maidstone. The squad who came so close to relegation the year before was largely dismantled with a whole raft of new players replacing them. During the close season it had become increasingly apparent the club could not afford to field a competitive Isthmian Premier team and fund the building of a new stadium, so with what limited funds the club had seemingly tied up in paying new players it was decided to try and fund the construction at James Whatman Way by bidding for a £1.2million grant from the Football Foundation. The bid was turned down in October 2008 and the club was subsequently put up for sale by chairman Paul Bowden-Brown. However no takeover was forthcoming and as a result of this the club had no choice but to halve their wage bill from £6000 to £3000 per week. The majority of the players took pay cuts and led Maidstone to their best league finish since reforming, finishing a comfortable 15th in the Isthmian Premier table and reaching the 4th qualifying round of the FA Cup.

During the 2009 close season Maidstone moved from their temporary Bourne Park home in Sittingbourne to Ashford Town's stadium, The Homelands, citing lower rent and a deal to receive a percentage of refreshment takings as the reason for the move. However the move only increased Maidstone's financial woes due to a sharp drop in attendances, and in December 2009 it was revealed two months of staff pay was to be deferred to the end of the season, a move that led to Alan Walker and Lloyd Hume resigning as managers of the club. Reserve team boss Pete Nott stepped up to the first team managers role and led Maidstone to an 18th-place finish, avoiding relegation with a game to spare.

In October 2010 the club was taken over by shareholder Oliver Ash and Terry Casey with Paul Bowden-Brown stepping down as chairman. In November 2010 the club's new directors sacked first team boss Peter Nott and his backroom staff with the team bottom of the table and out of the FA Cup. Former Gravesend & Northfleet manager Andy Ford was swiftly appointed manager, but he could not improve the club's fortunes and resigned in March 2011 with the club bottom of the league and 8 points adrift from safety. Club captain Jay Saunders was appointed caretaker manager until the end of the season, and although he oversaw the team to 5 wins from nine games he could not save Maidstone from relegation. Saunders was subsequently given the permanent managers job.

In the 2011 close season the club returned to groundshare at Sittingbourne's Bourne Park after their two-year spell at Ashford's Homelands Stadium, and soon after construction finally began on the club's new ground The Gallagher Stadium. The club finished the season in sixth place, just outside the play-offs. The 2012 close season saw Maidstone finally come home, moving into the Gallagher Stadium in July 2012. The club opened the £2.6 million stadium with a showpiece friendly against Brighton & Hove Albion in front of a sell-out crowd. After a two-horse race for the Isthmian League Division One South title with Dulwich Hamlet, and regularly playing in front of crowds of 1,500+, Maidstone eventually won promotion to the Isthmian League Premier Division after beating Faversham Town 3–0 in the Isthmian League Division One South play-off final.

During the 2014–15 season, Maidstone United qualified for the first round proper of the FA Cup for the first time in their history. Maidstone played a goalless draw away to Stevenage of League Two and in the replay at home in front of a capacity crowd went through to the second round proper, winning 2–1. In the second round Maidstone lost 3–1 at Wrexham of the Conference Premier. Maidstone United went on to win the Isthmian Premier title following a season-long battle with Margate, then Dulwich Hamlet and finally Hendon. The title was effectively won at Champion Hill, home of Dulwich Hamlet, on 18 April 2015 with Maidstone United drawing 0–0 and Hendon drawing 0–0 away at Grays Athletic. The near-1,000 travelling Stones fans celebrated on the pitch with the Dulwich Hamlet fans, their best position since reforming. The title was officially won on home soil on 25 April 2015 with a 3–2 win over East Thurrock United.

=== 2015–present: The National League and FA Cup run ===
After winning the Isthmian League Premier Division, Maidstone United were promoted to the National League South (formerly the Conference South). In the 2015–16 season the team again qualified for the first round proper of the FA Cup where they narrowly lost 1–0 at home to League Two side Yeovil Town in front of a record-breaking crowd of 2,811. On 14 May 2016, Maidstone United were promoted to the National League after defeating Ebbsfleet United in the National League South promotion final at Stonebridge Road. The match finished 2–2 after extra time, and Maidstone won 4–3 in the resulting penalty shoot-out.

Maidstone were relegated back to the National League South after three seasons in the National League by finishing in 24th place in 2018–19. In the 2021–22 season, Maidstone won the National League South title. They were unable to consolidate this position and were relegated back to the sixth tier, with five matches remaining. In the 2023–24 season, Maidstone reached the FA Cup fifth round for the first time, and in doing so became the first team outside of the top five divisions to reach the fifth round since Blyth Spartans in 1977–78. Having defeated Football League sides including Barrow and Stevenage, the Stones subsequently won 2–1 away to Ipswich Town in the fourth round. In the fifth round, Maidstone lost 5–0 away to Coventry City backed by 4,800 away supporters. In the following season, Maidstone reached the 2025 National League South play-off final but lost 1–0 to Boreham Wood.

== Shirts, colours and badge ==
Since reformation Maidstone's home shirts have been amber with black trim. All white was the template used for away shirts, but from 2009 to 2013 the club wore sky blue. They returned to a white away kit in the summer of 2013. In 2017, the away kit was changed to purple shirt, shorts and socks, with a white trim around the sleeves.

=== Shirt manufacturers and sponsors ===
Period	Kit Supplier	Shirt sponsor (chest)	Shirt sponsor (sleeve)
2000–01	—	Maidstone Adscene	—
2001–02	—	MI Pankhurst	—
2002–03	—	Jobec	—
2003–05	Score	KF Concept	—
2005–06	Score	KM Group	—
2006–08	Macron	Britelite	—
2008–09	Macron	Icom	—
2009–10 (Note: The Icom sponsor for the 2009–10 season was only used for the home kit)	Macron	Icom	Knapp
2010–11	Macron	—	Knapp
2011	Macron	Kent Messenger	Knapp
2011–13	Macron	Britelite	Knapp
2013–14	Macron	Britelite	Laguna Motorcycles
2014–21	Macron	Britelite	Churchill Security Systems
2022–	Macron	Manchett	Synecore

== Stadiums ==
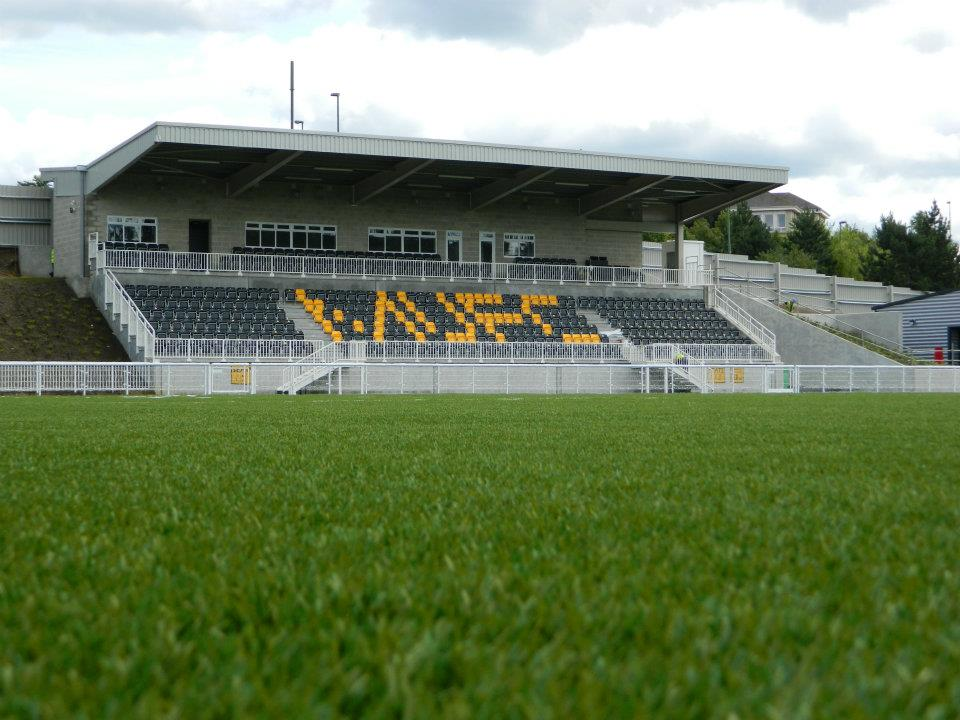
The Gallagher Stadium in 2012

Maidstone United play their home games at The Gallagher Stadium, James Whatman Way, Maidstone, Kent, ME14 1LQ. After the original club folded, the new Maidstone United played their games on a pitch behind a Mormon meeting house, which had originally been the MUFC reserves and training pitch – just metres from where the old ground had been. Promotion to the Kent League in 2001 meant the club had to move away yet again as the current ground was nowhere near up to standard.

The club had earmarked James Whatman Way as the site of a new ground in Maidstone, but until this was built they would have to groundshare outside the town. Maidstone played for a year at Sittingbourne's old Central Park stadium before relocating, along with the "Brickies", to Bourne Park, a converted training pitch behind the main Central Park complex. Unable to generate the funds to build at Whatman Way, The Stones stayed at Bourne Park until 2009, before moving to groundshare with Ashford Town, citing favourable rent and a cut of food and bar takings as the reason for the move. The move to Ashford caused a sharp dip in attendances and the club returned to ground share at Bourne Park for the 2011–12 season; however the club finally moved into James Whatman Way, known as the Gallagher Stadium, at the start of the 2012–13 season.

Years	Ground
1993–2001	London Road, Maidstone
2001–2002	Central Park (Groundshare with Sittingbourne)
2002–2009	Bourne Park (Groundshare with Sittingbourne)
2009–2011	The Homelands (Groundshare with Ashford Town 2009–10, Sole tenants 2010–11)
2011–2012	Bourne Park (Groundshare with Sittingbourne)
2012–	Gallagher Stadium, Maidstone

== Support ==
Maidstone returned to their home town and home crowds surged by 350% to average 1,698 in the league during the 2012–13 season at the club's new Gallagher Stadium. The table below gives a summary of the attendance figures in all of Maidstone United's league games since the club's final season in the Kent County League in the 2000–01 season.

Season	League	Ground	Lowest	Highest	Average	% ±
2000–01	Kent County League Premier Division	London Road, Maidstone	(n/a)	(n/a)	198	-
2001–02	Kent League Premier Division	Central Park, Sittingbourne	(n/a)	(n/a)	298	+50.5%
2002–03	Kent League Premier Division	Bourne Park, Sittingbourne	(n/a)	(n/a)	352	+18.1%
2003–04	Kent League Premier Division	Bourne Park, Sittingbourne	208	329	255	-27.6%
2004–05	Kent League Premier Division	Bourne Park, Sittingbourne	174	346	246	-3.5%
2005–06	Kent League Premier Division	Bourne Park, Sittingbourne	232	573	336	+36.6%
2006–07	Isthmian League Division One South	Bourne Park, Sittingbourne	222	814	432	+28.4%
2007–08	Isthmian League Premier Division	Bourne Park, Sittingbourne	238	1,224	444	+2.8%
2008–09	Isthmian League Premier Division	Bourne Park, Sittingbourne	218	689	388	-12.6%
2009–10	Isthmian League Premier Division	The Homelands, Ashford	128	447	255	-34.3%
2010–11	Isthmian League Premier Division	The Homelands, Ashford	171	488	311	+22.0%
2011–12	Isthmian League Division One South	Bourne Park, Sittingbourne	255	705	377	+21.2%
2012–13	Isthmian League Division One South	Gallagher Stadium, Maidstone	1,005	2,305	1,698	+350.5%
2013–14	Isthmian League Premier Division	Gallagher Stadium, Maidstone	1,292	2,296	1,821	+7.2%
2014–15	Isthmian League Premier Division	Gallagher Stadium, Maidstone	1,094	2,296	1,846	+1.4%
2015–16	National League South	Gallagher Stadium, Maidstone	1,731	3,030	2,208	+19.6%
2016–17	National League	Gallagher Stadium, Maidstone	1,714	3,409	2,386	+8.1%
2017–18	National League	Gallagher Stadium, Maidstone	1,945	3,225	2,412	+1.1%
2018–19	National League	Gallagher Stadium, Maidstone	1,570	3,087	2,179	-9.7%
2019–20	National League South	Gallagher Stadium, Maidstone	1,337	2,520	1,831	-16.0%
2021–22	National League South	Gallagher Stadium, Maidstone	1,805	4,175	2,453	+34.0%
2022–23	National League	Gallagher Stadium, Maidstone	1,463	3,341	2,142	-12.7%
2023–24	National League South	Gallagher Stadium, Maidstone	1,450	3,119	2,131	-0.9%
2024-25	National League South	Gallagher Stadium, Maidstone	1,773	3,670	2,374	+11.4%

No attendances were recorded for Season 2020–21, due to COVID-19 restrictions.

=== Rivalries ===
Maidstone fans have traditionally had a strong rivalry with Gillingham. The old Maidstone are the only traditional Kent club to ever join Gillingham in the Football League, and contested a total of 11 games with Gillingham in the old Division 4 and FA Cup in the 1980s and early 1990s. There have been only three matches since the Stones reformed, the first being a mid-season friendly in 2002 at Central Park, the second being a Kent Senior Cup quarter final tie in 2018, where Maidstone won 2–1, and the third once again in the Kent Senior Cup second round in 2023, where Maidstone won 2–0.

A rivalry also remains with Tonbridge Angels. Back in the 1970s, the old Maidstone United and the 'Angels' regularly met in the Southern League before Maidstone moved on to become founder members of the National League (then known as the Alliance Premier League). The two clubs were reconciled after Maidstone's reformation, meeting in the 2002–03 FA Cup – with the Stones winning 3–2. The clubs then met regularly in the Isthmian League Premier Division between 2007 and 2011 and again in the 2014–15 season. In January 2015, there was a "confrontation" between Tonbridge Angels coach Barry Moore and a Maidstone supporter after a game between the sides. Moore was banned by the FA for four months following the incident. Old Southern League foes Ebbsfleet United (then Gravesend & Northfleet) have perhaps become the club's biggest current-day rivals, with the clubs' recent time together in the National League and National League South punctuated by ill-will both at boardroom level and on the terraces.

=== Fan culture ===
Stones Live! is a radio station run since 2008, offering commentary from most matches plus other club-related content. It was voted Sports Station of the Year at the 2010–11 Internet Radio Awards. A fanzine site “Plastic Passion” was launched in February 2014, in part to celebrate one of the most successful eras in the club's history. Plastic Passion spawned a spin off book, believed to be the first ever Maidstone United e-book, “When I was Just A Little Boy” in 2016. A second book, this time available in physical form, "Exodus" was published in December 2016, detailing the period between 1988 and 2012 and the struggle to find a permanent home.

The Football League era saw the birth of four fanzines, "Show Me The Way To Go Home", "Spirit of London Road (aka S.O.L.D)", "Yellow Fever", later renamed "Golden Days", and "The Foundation Stone" which ran for just a couple of issues. In 2000, with the club languishing in the Kent County League, a fanzine known as “SHAFTED!” ran for five issues. By the time the club returned to the Kent League in 2001 the team behind Show Me The Way To Go Home decided to revive it after almost ten years. It ran for several seasons and was highly acclaimed. In 2005 it was named as one of the best 11 fanzines in the country by the Independent, although it had ceased publication before the club returned to Maidstone in 2012. The void was eventually filled by "It's All Gone Amber", which was first published in 2015. It was named after the line uttered by commentator Derek Rae when Frannie Collin scored the winner for Maidstone against Stevenage in an FA Cup first round replay in 2014.

== First team ==
As of 16 August 2026

Note: Flags indicate national team as defined under FIFA eligibility rules; some limited exceptions apply. Players may hold more than one non-FIFA nationality.

No.	Pos.	Nation	Player
2	DF	ENG	Dermi Lusala
3	DF	ENG	Leo Hamblin
4	DF	ENG	Taylor Foran (Leadership Group)
5	DF	ENG	George Fowler (captain)
6	MF	WAL	Alfie Tuck
7	MF	ENG	Jayden Davis
9	FW	ENG	Ken Charles (Leadership Group)
10	MF	ENG	Riley Court
11	FW	ENG	Tom Leahy
12	DF	ENG	Frankie Hvid
13	GK	ENG	Lenny Holden
14	FW	ENG	Mark Boruk

No.	Pos.	Nation	Player
17	FW	ENG	Nana Boateng
20	GK	ENG	Lucas Brookman
21	FW	POR	Leone Gravata
22	DF	ENG	Tariq Uwakwe
25	MF	ENG	Ryan Hanson (vice captain)
26	DF	ENG	Farron Chime
27	DF	ENG	Timi Olagbemi
28	MF	ENG	Juan Sanchez
29	FW	ENG	Rowan Gravenell
30	MF	ENG	Rocco Iandolo
—	MF	ENG	Alex Stepien-Iwumene (on loan from Bromley)

=== On loan ===
Note: Flags indicate national team as defined under FIFA eligibility rules; some limited exceptions apply. Players may hold more than one non-FIFA nationality.

No.	Pos.	Nation	Player

== Reserves, youth and community ==
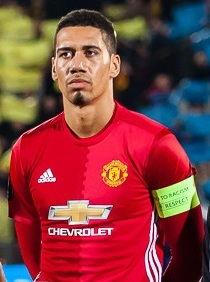
Chris Smalling

Maidstone's youth and community sides are currently members of the Isthmian Youth League and Kent Youth League as well as being members of various local, women's/girls', deaf and disability leagues.

The club also runs an academy, giving over fifty 16 to 18-year-old players the chance to study, train and play at the Gallagher Stadium. Players study for a BTEC Level 3 in Sport and a range of vocational football-related qualifications, and also play in the Conference Youth Alliance.

Maidstone's youth teams have provided many players to the first team in recent years. The most successful and high-profile product of the club's youth system is England international Chris Smalling, who spent three years at the club before moving to Fulham and subsequently to Manchester United and AS Roma. Smalling made a total of 16 appearances for Maidstone, and whilst playing for the club he also played for England Schoolboys' Under 18 side.

The club has a strong emphasis on football for the community and most of its teams train at the Gallagher Stadium. As well as boys and girls teams at most ages, there are PAN disability and deaf teams. United are a Charter Standard Community Club and were one of the first clubs in the country to sign up to the Deaf Friendly Football Clubs pledge.

== Club staff and officials ==
Position	Name
Manager	Craig Fagan
Assistant manager	Rob Tuvey
Goalkeeper coach	Zach Foster-Crouch
Fitness and conditioning	Jak Nye
Sports and rehab physiotherapist	Alyssa Rose
Owners	TBD
Chief Executive	Bill Williams

== Notable players ==
This list comprises former or current players who have made over 100 appearances in a fully professional league or have senior international experience.

- (England) Dean Beckwith
- (England) Steve Butler
- (England) Jermaine Darlington
- (England) Roland Edge
- (England) Paul Haylock
- (England) Jon Harley
- (England) Peter Hawkins
- (England) Zavon Hines
- (England) Garry Kimble
- (England) Stuart Lewis
- (England) Karl Murray
- (England) Magnus Okuonghae
- (England) Joe Pigott
- (England) Alan Pouton
- (England) Jake Robinson
- (England) Bradley Sandeman
- (England) Mark Saunders
- (England) Ian Selley
- (England) Chris Smalling
- (England) Neil Smith
- (England) Alan Walker
- (England) Simon Walton
- (England) Lawrie Wilson
- (Jamaica) Jamar Loza
- (Lebanon) Hady Ghandour
- (New Zealand) Adrian Webster
- (Nigeria) Yemi Odubade
- (Trinidad and Tobago) Andre Boucaud
- (Trinidad and Tobago) Ian Cox
- (Trinidad and Tobago) Kelvin Jack
- (Wales) Jake Cassidy

== Managerial history ==
Years	Name
1993–1996	(England) Bill Tucker & Jack Whiteley
1996	(England) Graham Martin
1997	(England) Mickey Chatwin & Chad Andrews
1997	(England) Nicky Chappell
1997–1998	(England) Mark Irvine
1998–1999	(England) Jason Lillis
1999–2000	(England) Matt Toms
2000–2003	(Scotland) Jim Ward
2003–2004	(England) Mal Watkins
2004–2006	(England) Lloyd Hume
2006–2010	(England) Alan Walker & Lloyd Hume
2010	(England) Peter Nott
2010–2011	(England) Andy Ford
2011–2018	(England) Jay Saunders
2018	(England) Harry Wheeler
2019–2020	(England) John Still & Hakan Hayrettin
2020–2023	(England) Hakan Hayrettin
2023–present	(Cameroon) George Elokobi

== League history ==
- 1993–1994: Kent County League Division Four
- 1994–1995: Kent County League Division Two
- 1995–1999: Kent County League Division One
- 1999–2001: Kent County League Premier Division
- 2001–2006: Kent League Premier Division
- 2006–2007: Isthmian League Division One South
- 2007–2011: Isthmian League Premier Division
- 2011–2013: Isthmian League Division One South
- 2013–2015: Isthmian League Premier Division
- 2015–2016: National League South
- 2016–2019: National League
- 2019–2022: National League South
- 2022–2023: National League
- 2023–present: National League South

== Honours ==
League

- National League South (level 6)
  - Champions: 2021–22
  - Play-off winners: 2016
- Isthmian League (level 7)
  - Champions: 2014–15
- Isthmian League Division One (level 8)
  - Champions: 2006–07
  - Play-off winners: 2013
- Kent League Premier (level 9)
  - Champions: 2001–02, 2005–06
- Kent County League Premier
  - Champions: 2000–01
- Kent County League Division One
  - Champions: 1998–99
- Kent County League Division Two
  - Champions: 1994–95
- Kent County League Division Four
  - Champions: 1993–94

Cup

- Isthmian League Cup
  - Winners: 2013–14
- Isthmian Charity Shield
  - Winners: 2015–16
- Premier Division Cup
  - Winners: 2001–02, 2005–06
- Challenge/Charity Shield
  - Winners: 2002–03, 2003–04
- Kent Senior Cup
  - Winners: 2017–18, 2018–19, 2023–24, 2025–26
- Kent Senior Trophy
  - Winners: 2002–03
- Weald of Kent Charity Cup
  - Winners: 1999–2000, 2000–01
- Kent County League Barry Bundock West Kent Challenge Shield
  - Winners: 1993–94, 1998–99
- Tunbridge Wells Charity Cup
  - Winners: 1993–94

== Records and statistics ==
Maidstone's best ever league finish came in the 2016–17 season when they came 14th in the National League. Maidstone's highest ever victory came in their first season since reforming, beating Aylesford 12–1 in the Kent County League Division Four. The club's record attendance came at the Gallagher Stadium, when a capacity 4,175 spectators saw Maidstone play Hampton and Richmond on 4 May 2022 in the final game of the 2021–22 season to see the Stones lift the National League South trophy, the previous highest attendance was 4,105 on 15 July 2017 in a pre-season match to celebrate the fifth anniversary of the Gallagher Stadium. The club's appearance record is held by Tom Mills.
