= Gallagher Stadium =

Football stadium in Kent, England

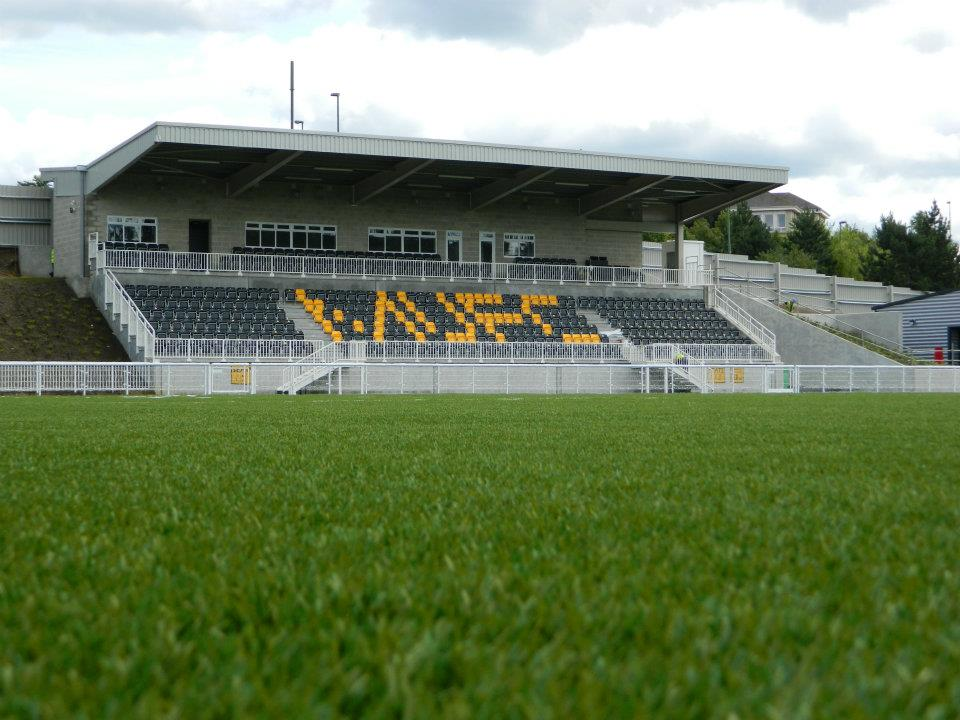
- Interactive map of Gallagher Stadium
- Full name: Gallagher Stadium
- Former names: James Whatman Way
- Location: James Whatman Way; Maidstone ME14 1LQ; Kent; England
- Coordinates: 51°16′48″N 0°30′57″E
- Owner: Maidstone United F.C.
- Operator: Maidstone United F.C.
- Capacity: 4,200 (792 seated)
- Executive suites: 3 (two executive boxes and one directors/vice presidents lounge)
- Surface: 3G Artificial Turf
- Record attendance: 4,175, Maidstone United vs Hampton & Richmond, 7 May 2022

Construction
- Groundbreaking: January 2007
- Built: July 2012
- Opened: 14 July 2012
- Cost: £2.8 million
- Architect: Prime Group
- Project manager: Prime Group
- General contractor: Gallagher Group

Gallagher Stadium is a football stadium in Maidstone, Kent, England, which has been the home of Maidstone United Football Club since its opening in 2012, when the club hosted Brighton & Hove Albion in a friendly. The stadium has a capacity of 4,200, of which 792 are seated.

== The stadium ==
=== 3G artificial pitch ===
Rather than the traditional choice of grass, Maidstone were the first English team to build a stadium with third generation artificial turf. The reasons for going with the synthetic turf were threefold, the first being to eliminate match postponements caused by waterlogging and freezing conditions, the second so that the pitch can be hired out, bringing in vital funds (around £120,000 to £150,000 profit per year), and thirdly so that the stadium can be a hub for all the club’s fans. The pitch currently hosts the home matches of the club's first team, academy (under 18s), under 16s-13s and under 7s-8s. It is also used for training among a large number of the club's teams, and in addition is hired out to other organisations for wider community use.

A downside of the 3G pitch is that so far the club has only gained permission to use the pitch in the Football Conference (Conference National / North and South) downwards. As a result of this, promotion to The Football League will not be possible until permission is granted from the league or the 3G turf is replaced with grass. In a bid to overcome these hurdles, Maidstone United lead a group of professional clubs looking to promote the merits of 3G surfaces called '3G4US'. However, as of the 2014–2015 competition, the FA allowed the use of 3G artificial pitches in every round of the FA Cup.

The introduction of 3G pitches in the FA Cup meant that Maidstone were able to host Stevenage FC in a First Round FA Cup Replay in front of the BT Sport cameras, a game which they went on to win 2-1 and progress to the second round.

In the summer of 2016, the club relaid the pitch ahead of the inaugural campaign in non-league's top flight, the National League.

==== Reaction ====
Upon seeing his side play on the surface, former Brighton & Hove Albion manager Gus Poyet described the pitch as "magnificent" and "perfection". After taking part in a Charity match at the stadium, West Ham United legend Tony Cottee described the 3G facility as a "great idea", citing that the surface's ability to deal with adverse weather conditions meant it could be the way forward for non-league clubs.

=== Stands ===
There are stands on the north, east and south sides of the pitch. The west side of the stadium remains undeveloped for spectators apart from flat hard standing.

Main Stand: The main stand is situated on the eastern side of the ground. It includes 750 spectator seats, a press area, media room and two executive lounges. There is a further temporary media/press area attached, but separate, to this stand.

North Stand: The north stand provides a covered long and steep terrace with safe standing for up to 1768 supporters.

South Stand: The south stand provides a covered long and shallow covered terrace for up to 500 supporters.

=== Other ===
The southeastern part of the stadium houses the main building which holds the club's office/reception, the Spitfire Lounge (clubhouse), classrooms for the club's academy side, the boardroom, changing rooms, a physio room and storage rooms. It also houses a small seated spectators area for players' guests.

Turnstiles are situated at the north and south ends of the stadium.

The stadium's floodlights are erected upon four pylons at each corner of the stadium.

== Name ==
It was announced on 2 January 2012 that the Gallagher Group, a building, civil engineering, quarrying and property business who were the main contractors in the building of the stadium, had signed a five-year deal for the naming rights of the stadium, worth £150,000.

Prior to the club selling its naming rights, the stadium was known as James Whatman Way (often shortened to Whatman Way), the name of the road the stadium is on.

== History ==
=== Pre-construction ===
After reforming in 1992 (the original Maidstone United sold their stadium in 1988 and moved into Dartford's ground, a move that eventually saw the club go out of business), Maidstone played in the Kent County League Division 4, with their home games taking place where the original club's old training pitch had been situated, at London Road near Allington. The club worked their way through the Kent County League and were promoted to the Kent League Premier Division in 2001; however the current ground was nowhere near Kent League standards – so the club elected to ground share with Sittingbourne (where they remained until 2009 when they opted to ground share with Ashford before, season) while they tried to engineer a move to their preferred site for a new stadium in Maidstone at James Whatman Way. Numerous legal disputes and even a colony of Great Crested Newts on the site delayed the club's attempts to get permission to build a ground there; however in 2004 the club finally made its first steps towards returning to their home town when an application for planning permission to build a stadium at James Whatman Way was unanimously accepted.

However, no real work could begin until the lease to acquire the ground from its owners the Ministry of Defence was signed. After yet more red tape was surpassed the lease was finally signed in March 2006. Despite Maidstone now having the green light to start construction, there were questions over the clubs ability to finance the stadium and almost a year passed before some preliminary work took place in January 2007. No significant inroads were made however, and soon the site became overgrown and disused. By the summer of 2008, with no movement at Whatman Way since the initial work and Maidstone suffering financial problems, it was decided the club were unable to fund the ground themselves and a bid was placed for a £1.2 million grant from the Football Foundation to build the stadium. However the bid was turned down, and after this the new stadium took a back seat as all funds were focussed on keeping the club afloat.

A change of club ownership in October 2010 saw a renewed attempt to move to the stadium. A new company, named Maidstone United Ground Ltd, was formed to deal solely with stadium matters, and by the summer of 2011 £1 million had been raised towards building the ground, and the land's freehold had been purchased outright from the Ministry of Defence. At this time it was decided to go ahead with the construction of the stadium.

=== Construction ===
After some preliminary work taking place throughout August 2011, full construction of the stadium began on 26 September 2011. The stadium's floodlights were fully installed by late January 2012, and at the start of February the club was informed it had secured a £150,000 grant from the Football Foundation through the Football Stadia Improvement Fund to help finance the build. The terracing at the north and south ends of the ground was installed on 12 and 13 April 2012. The laying of the stadium's artificial 3G pitch began on 30 April 2012 and was completed by 2 May 2012. Within a matter of weeks the club's youth and community teams began training on the pitch whilst construction of the stadium continued. The installation of the seats in the main stand began on 29 May 2012. The stadium was fully completed on 13 July 2012.

=== Changes and capacity increases ===
After the finishing of the initial build in 2012, the club continued to increase the capacity with the extension of the modular terraces at both the north and south ends of the ground.

In late March 2014 the owners of the stadium revealed that they were preparing to apply for planning permission to construct a brand new stand behind the goal at the north end of the ground. However, in July 2014 it was confirmed that these plans were to be put to one side for the time being and instead replaced with a project to extend the existing main stand. This £500,000 scheme saw the addition of around 300 seats (from 442 to 750), 50 Vice President seats and new gates/turnstiles which increased capacity to over 3,030. Work began in late May 2015 and the expansion of the Main Stand was completed on 11 August 2015 just in time for the first home league match of the season, against Ebbsfleet United.

Following promotion to non-league's top tier in 2016, the club relaid its 3G pitch, and once again had to look to increase the capacity of the stadium, this time to at least 4,000. In June 2016 the club announced plans for a permanent stand at the north end of the stadium, capable of housing up to 1,768 standing spectators, with the structure also being built with future conversion to seating in mind. Planning permission was granted at the start of October 2016, and work began in November 2016 with the removal of the old modular terracing.

=== Milestones ===
- The first game at the stadium was a friendly against Brighton & Hove Albion on 14 July 2012, which Brighton won 5–0. The first goal at the stadium was scored by Craig Mackail Smith.
- The first goal at the stadium for Maidstone United was scored by Shaun Welford in a 1–0 win against Dagenham & Redbridge on 17 July 2012.
- The first competitive match at the stadium was an Isthmian League Division One South match against Walton & Hersham on 18 August 2012, a game which Walton & Hersham won 5–4. The first competitive goal at the stadium was scored by Phil Williams of Walton, while the first Maidstone scorer was Paul Booth.
- The first FA Cup match at the stadium was between Maidstone United and Colliers Wood United, a match that Maidstone won 4–1. The first FA Cup goal was scored by Mario Embalo of Colliers Wood, while the first Maidstone goal was scored by Ade Olorunda. The game was also Maidstone's first competitive victory at the stadium.
- The first FA Trophy match at the stadium was between Maidstone United and Whitehawk. Maidstone won the game 3–2, with the first goal being scored by Tim Olorunda.
- The club's stadium's record attendance was set when a crowd of 4,175 saw Maidstone United play against Hampton & Richmond on 7 May 2022 in a National League South match.

== Location ==
The stadium is situated on a former Royal Engineers drilling site next to the River Medway, off the A229 that links Maidstone town centre to the M20. It is a ten-minute walk from Maidstone East railway station (Maidstone East Line), and the town centre.
