= Alan Kimble =

English footballer (born 1966)

Personal information
- Full name: Alan Frank Kimble
- Date of birth: 6 August 1966 (age 60)
- Place of birth: Poole, England
- Height: 5 ft 9 in (1.75 m)
- Position: Defender

Youth career
- ?–1984: Charlton Athletic

Senior career*
Years	Team	Apps	(Gls)
1984–1986	Charlton Athletic	6	(0)
1985	→ Exeter City (loan)	1	(0)
1986–1993	Cambridge United	299	(24)
1993–2002	Wimbledon	215	(0)
2002	→ Peterborough United (loan)	3	(0)
2002–2003	Luton Town	12	(0)
2003–2004	Dagenham & Redbridge	22	(0)
2004–2005	Heybridge Swifts	22	(0)
Total		580	(24)

Managerial career
- 2010: Aveley
- 2011–2012: Hemel Hempstead Town (assistant)
- 2012–2013: Eastbourne Borough (assistant)
- 2014–2015: Maldon & Tiptree
- * Club domestic league appearances and goals

Alan Frank Kimble (born 6 August 1966) is an English football manager and former professional footballer.

As a player, he was a defender who notably played in the Premier League for Wimbledon. He also played in the Football League for Charlton Athletic, Exeter City, Cambridge United, Peterborough United and Luton Town before finishing his career with non-league sides Dagenham & Redbridge and Heybridge Swifts.

Following retirement, Kimble has worked as a manager and assistant manager within the non-league game for Ebbsfleet United, Aveley, Hemel Hempstead Town, Eastbourne Borough and Maldon & Tiptree.

== Playing career ==
=== Charlton Athletic ===
Left back Kimble started his career at Charlton Athletic alongside his twin brother, Garry Kimble. They both progressed through the youth ranks to make brief appearances in the Charlton first team before the pair of them joined Exeter City on loan and then Cambridge United on free transfers in July 1986.

=== Cambridge United ===
Alan Kimble went on to play 299 games for United, scoring 24 goals, most of which came from the penalty spot. He played a pivotal part in the club's amazing success in climbing the lower leagues in the early 1990s but left following relegation from (old) Division Two in 1993 after seven years with the club.

=== Wimbledon ===
Kimble moved to Premier League side Wimbledon for a fee of £175,000 and stayed there for nine years, and was a regular first team player, making 215 league appearances. While in the Wimbledon side, Kimble was known to get to the byline and lump the ball upfield to the strikers. He failed to score a league goal for the club but did net once for them against Huddersfield Town in one of his 25 League Cup games for the club. Wimbledon finished in the top ten of the Premier League three times, and were League Cup semi finalists twice and FA Cup semi finalists once while Kimble played for them, but went down from the Premier League in 2000. He finally left at the end of the 2001-02 season, around the same time that the club's controversial move to Milton Keynes – which eventually resulted in its rebranding as Milton Keynes Dons – was announced.

=== Luton Town and non-League ===
After playing at the highest level he left Wimbledon at the end of the 2001–02 season following a brief loan spell at Peterborough United and joined ex-Wimbledon manager Joe Kinnear at Luton Town. He managed only 12 games for Luton before dropping into the Conference National to play for Dagenham & Redbridge where he played a further 22 games to leave him with a total of more than 550 games in his top class career. He later had a brief spell with Heybridge Swifts.

== Managerial career ==
He invited by ex-Cambridge teammate Liam Daish to become assistant manager of Gravesend & Northfleet in March 2005.

In the close season of 2009, due to financial difficulties at the club, Kimble was released from the club now known as Ebbsfleet United.

After leaving Ebbsfleet, Kimble became manager of Isthmian League Premier Division club Aveley in May 2010, with his twin brother Garry as his assistant. After five months in the job, he left Aveley in November for personal reasons before being replaced by Carl Griffiths. Kimble was assistant manager at Hemel Hempstead Town, before moving on to Eastbourne Borough to take on the same role in February 2012.

In 2014, he became manager of Maldon & Tiptree. He left the club at the end of the 2014–15 season.

== Honours ==
Cambridge United

- Football League Third Division: 1990–91
- Football League Fourth Division play-offs: 1990
