= Steve Thompson (footballer, born 1972) =

English footballer (born 1972)

Steven Anthony Thompson (born 17 February 1972) is an English former footballer. He made two appearances in The Football League for Gillingham.
