= Adrian Owers =

English footballer (born 1965)

Personal information
- Full name: Adrian Richard Owers
- Date of birth: 26 February 1965 (age 61)
- Place of birth: Chelmsford, England
- Position: Midfielder

Senior career*
Years	Team	Apps	(Gls)
1982–1985	Southend United	27	(0)
1985–1987	Chelmsford City		
1987–1991	Brighton & Hove Albion	40	(4)
1990–1991	→ Gillingham (loan)	10	(0)
1991–1992	Maidstone United	1	(0)
–	Dagenham & Redbridge		
- * Club domestic league appearances and goals

Adrian Richard Owers (born 26 February 1965 in Chelmsford, England) is a former professional footballer who played in The Football League for Southend United, Brighton & Hove Albion, Gillingham and Maidstone United.

In 2009, he was called upon to play for England in FIFA's Senior World Cup.
