= Dave Jordan (footballer) =

English footballer

David Charles Jordan (born 26 October 1971) is an English former professional footballer.

== Career ==
Born in Gillingham, Kent, Jordan was spotted by local professional club Gillingham while playing for the local schools representative team and signed as a trainee in February 1989. After impressing with his performances for the club's youth team, he was signed to a professional contract in June 1990, at the age of 18. During the 1990–91 season, he was sent out on loan to five different non-League clubs, but also made his debut for Gillingham on 13 April 1991 against Stockport County. He made one further appearance in the Football League but was released from his contract in the summer of 1992, after which he played for a number of non-League teams in Kent.
