= Brendan Place =

Irish footballer and manager

Personal information
- Full name: Brendan Anthony Place
- Date of birth: 13 December 1965 (age 60)
- Place of birth: Dublin, Republic of Ireland
- Position: Centre back

Youth career
- Home Farm Everton

Senior career*
Years	Team	Apps	(Gls)
1983–1984	Home Farm Everton	12	(0)
1985–1986	Longford Town	22	(4)
1986–1989	Athlone Town	70	(8)
1989–1990	Gillingham	8	(0)
1996–1998	Home Farm Everton	28	(5)
1998–1999	Bohemians	6	(1)
1998	→ Monaghan United (loan)	18	(3)
	Shelbourne	?	(?)
1999–2000	Home Farm Everton	16	(0)
2000–2001	Malahide United	?	(?)
2001–2002	Monaghan United	22	(2)

Managerial career
- 2009–2010: Athlone Town
- * Club domestic league appearances and goals

Brendan Place (born 13 December 1965) is an Irish former professional football player and manager.

== Playing career ==
A central defender like his father, Brendan Place Sr., who himself was played in the League of Ireland, Brendan Jr. began his football career with the Dublin youth club Home Farm.

In 1983, he graduated to Home Farm's senior team, which was playing at the top level of domestic football in Ireland at the time. He made his debut against Derry City at the Brandywell, in Derry's first game in the League of Ireland.

After drawing the attention of cross-channel scouts with his subsequent displays for Longford Town and Athlone Town, Place was signed by Damien Richardson for Gillingham on 21 October 1989. He made his debut two days later against Chesterfield. However, his career with the English third division club was cut short when he suffered a serious neck injury, keeping him out of the game for six years. He eventually fully recovered and returned to his roots to play for Home Farm, playing at the time as Home Farm Everton. In his first season back, he was awarded the club's Player of the Season. In the 2000s, after spells with Bohemians, Shelbourne, Home Farm Fingal and as player manager for Malahide United, he concluded his playing career.

Place later returned to the top tier of Irish domestic football at 37 years of age with Monaghan United.

== Managing career ==
Place started as a development coach with the LOI/ FAI Soccer Academy in Dublin between 1999 and 2002. As a part of that time, he coached the Republic of Ireland U17 team that finished third in Japan in August 2004 and went on to work with the Republic of Ireland U19 team that qualified for the elite stage of the UEFA championship in Cyprus later that year. He also spent three years as high performance coach with the Elite Irish women's squad and had a spell as player-coach with Bohemians reserve squad.

Having brought non-League Malahide United to promotion as player manager, Place was appointed development youth coach for Home Farm Schoolboys before becoming player coach at Loughshinny Utd in 2005, bringing his team to the final of the Gilligan Cup.

In 2008, he took over as manager at Athlone Town. One of his first signings was his brother Stephen Place.

Brendan Place left Athlone in 2010 to concentrate on completing his UEFA pro licence. He already held a UEFA A licence and completed a sports psychology diploma. Place coached Crumlin United schoolboys and after a treble winning season at U16 level, he returned to Home Farm as head coach of U17s team for the 2012–13 season.

In 2013, Place was appointed head coach for Bohemians FC under-19s Eircom League.

A return to Eircom league followed for Place in 2015–16, with Tommy Dunne and newly promoted Galway United as opposition / match analysis scout.

In July 2016 Place was appointed U19s head coach at Hibernians FC.

== Honours ==
- League of Ireland First Division: 1
  - Athlone Town; 1987–88
- Leinster Senior Cup: 1
  - Athlone Town; 1988
- League of Ireland First Division: 1
  - Home Farm Everton; 1997–98
