= Ricky Pearson =

English footballer

Personal information
- Full name: Richard Pearson
- Date of birth: 18 October 1970 (age 56)
- Place of birth: Ulcombe, England
- Position: Defender

Senior career*
Years	Team	Apps	(Gls)
1988–1990	Gillingham	9	(0)
1990–1991	Ashford Town	21	(1)
1993–1994	Ashford Town	58	(1)
- * Club domestic league appearances and goals

Richard Pearson (born 18 October 1970) is an English former professional footballer. He made 9 appearances in The Football League for Gillingham. In 1990 he left Gillingham and joined Southern League club Ashford Town and played there over two spells.
