= Peter Johnson (footballer, born 1958) =

English footballer (born 1958)

Personal information
- Date of birth: 5 October 1958 (age 68)
- Place of birth: Harrogate, England
- Height: 5 ft 9 in (1.75 m)
- Position: Defender

Youth career
- Middlesbrough

Senior career*
Years	Team	Apps	(Gls)
1977–1980	Middlesbrough	43	(0)
1980–1982	Newcastle United	16	(0)
1982–1983	→ Bristol City (loan)	20	(0)
1982–1983	Doncaster Rovers	12	(0)
1983–1985	Darlington	89	(2)
1985	Crewe Alexandra	8	(0)
1985–1986	Exeter City	5	(0)
1986–1989	Southend United	126	(3)
1989–1991	Gillingham	69	(2)
1991–1992	Peterborough United	11	(0)
1992–?	Wycombe Wanderers	?	(?)
- * Club domestic league appearances and goals

Peter Edward Johnson (born 5 October 1958, in Harrogate) is an English former professional footballer who played as a defender. He currently is a part-time coach of York City under 16s. He made 399 appearances in the Football League for, Middlesbrough, Newcastle United, Bristol City, Doncaster Rovers, Darlington, Crewe Alexandra, Exeter City, Southend United, Gillingham and Peterborough United. At Southend United, he made over 120 appearances. In 1992, he moved to Wycombe Wanderers, at that time, still a non-league club.
