= Mike Trusson =

English footballer

Personal information
- Full name: Michael Sydney Trusson
- Date of birth: 26 May 1959 (age 67)
- Place of birth: Northolt, England
- Height: 5 ft 10 in (1.78 m)
- Position: Midfielder

Senior career*
Years	Team	Apps	(Gls)
1976–1980	Plymouth Argyle	73	(15)
1980–1983	Sheffield United	126	(31)
1983–1987	Rotherham United	124	(19)
1987–1989	Brighton & Hove Albion	37	(2)
1989–1991	Gillingham	74	(7)
1991–1992	Sing Tao		
1992	Bournemouth	0	(0)
1994–1996	STAMCO		
- * Club domestic league appearances and goals

Michael Sydney Trusson (born 26 May 1959) is an English former professional footballer. He made over 400 appearances in a fifteen-year professional career, and later worked in sports marketing and as a scout.

== Football career ==
Born in Northolt London, Trusson had trials with Chelsea as a schoolboy but was not signed by the club. After relocating to Somerset, he was spotted playing local amateur football by Plymouth Argyle, then of the Football League Second Division, and began his professional career for the club in the 1976–77 season. In his first season with the club, Argyle were relegated to the Third Division, but he remained with the club until 1980, making over 80 appearances in total. In 1980, he was transferred to another Third Division club, Sheffield United, but again saw his team relegated in his first season, as the "Blades" dropped into the Fourth Division. In the 1981–82 season Trusson missed only two of United's 46 league games and scored 11 goals to help the club gain promotion back to the Third Division at the first attempt. He was also the Sheffield United player of the year in seasons 1981–82 and 1982–83. In December 1983 he joined near-neighbours Rotherham United, where he spent four years and made nearly 150 appearances. In 1987, he moved to yet another Third Division club, Brighton & Hove Albion, and once again helped the team gain promotion. In 1989, he stepped down to the Fourth Division to join Gillingham, and rounded off his league career with three injury-blighted seasons at the Kent-based club before moving to Hong Kong to play for Sing Tao. On his return to England he signed for AFC Bournemouth, where former Gillingham teammate Tony Pulis was manager, but never played a match for the club. He did, however, spend two years serving as the club's youth team coach, and later had a brief spell as first team coach. After leaving Dean Court, he finished his football career playing non-league football in Sussex firstly as a player for Stamco in the Sussex League and then as player coach as Stamco got promoted through the English football league system to the Southern League.

== Post-football career ==
After retiring as a player, Trusson worked as marketing manager for Football Football, a football-themed restaurant in London. He also worked for the Professional Footballers' Association in a marketing role, and was described as a prominent figure in the marketing of the sport. He also worked as sponsorship manager for the World Snooker Association. In 2000, he was appointed as chief scout for Premier League club Portsmouth.

On 20 November 2020, he was appointed the assistant manager at Sheffield Wednesday to assist new manager Tony Pulis. His spell would last just over a month, he left the club when Pulis was dismissed on 28 December 2020.

== Honours ==
Sheffield United

- Football League Fourth Division: 1981–82
