= Peter Heritage =

English footballer

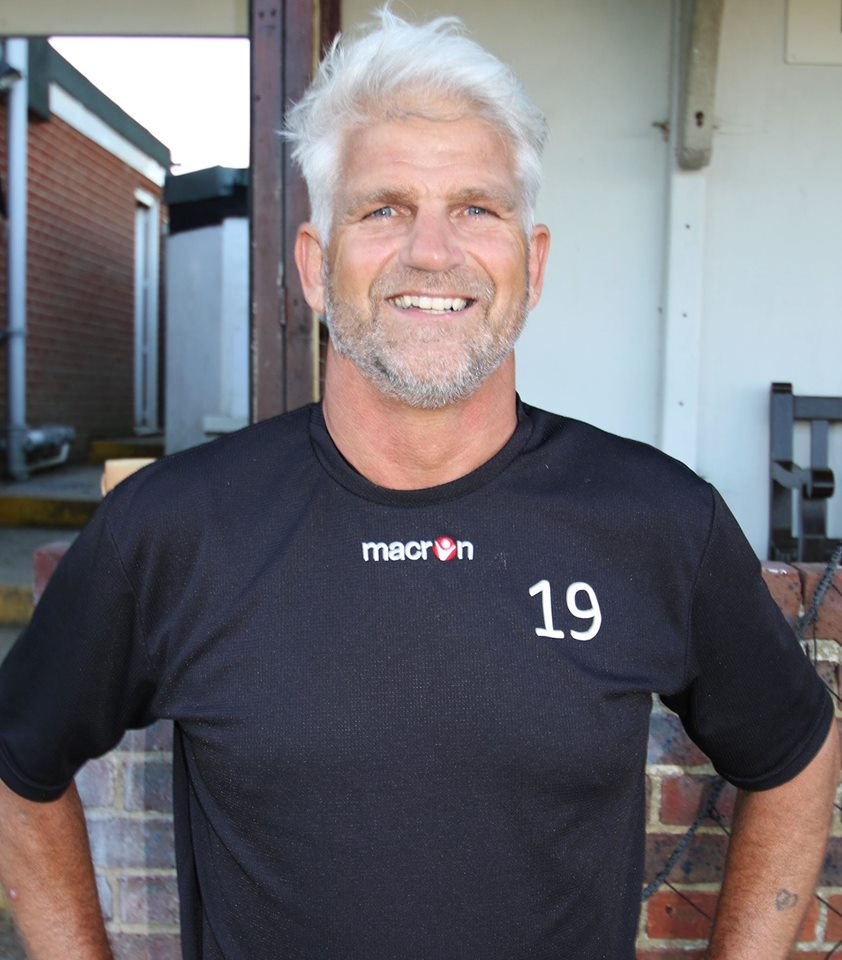
- Heritage in 2017

Personal information
- Full name: Peter Mark Heritage
- Date of birth: 8 November 1960 (age 65)
- Place of birth: Bexhill-on-Sea, England
- Position: Centre forward

Senior career*
Years	Team	Apps	(Gls)
- Albion United
- Bexhill Town
1979–1980	Hastings United		
1980	Tonbridge Angels		
1980–1983	Bexhill Town		
1983–1989	Hastings Town		
1989	Hythe Town	19	(12)
1989–1991	Gillingham	57	(11)
1991–1992	Hereford United	65	(10)
1992–1993	Doncaster Rovers	31	(2)
1993	→ Hastings Town (loan)		
1993	Woking	3	(0)
1993–1994	Hastings Town		
1994–1995	St Leonards		
1995–1996	Margate	19	(4)
1996–2005	Sidley United		
2007–2009	Bexhill United		

Managerial career
- 2001–2005: Sidley United (Assistant manager)
- 2009–2010: Bexhill United (Assistant manager)
- * Club domestic league appearances and goals

Peter Mark Heritage (born 8 November 1960) is an English former professional footballer. Born in Bexhill-on-Sea, he played for Hastings Town, Gillingham, Hereford United and Doncaster Rovers between 1989 and 1993.

== Club career ==
=== Early career ===
Heritage started his career as a centre back at Albion United (now Little Common) in the Sussex County League before moving to Bexhill Town and later in 1979 to Hastings Town. At the start of the 1980–81 season he joined Tonbridge Angels before rejoining Bexhill later in the season. He became a striker in the 1981–82 season, scoring 10 goals and was top scorer in the 1982–83 season with 32 goals, then moving back to Hastings Town staying until 1989 when Hythe Town paid £4,000 for him and his teammate, Terry White.

=== Professional career ===
In August 1989, Gillingham paid Hythe Town around £30,000 for Heritage and he became a Football League player for the first time just before his 29th birthday. He was nicknamed Hagar by the Gills supporters after The Sun newspaper strip, Hägar the Horrible. Scoring 11 goals in 66 appearances, he was loaned to Hereford United in January 1991 and a permanent transfer was made in March 1991 for £20,000

Heritage made 68 first team appearances for Hereford and scored 10 goals and in July 1992 was signed by Doncaster Rovers. Scoring twice in 36 games he was loaned to Hastings Town in January 1993 before being released from Doncaster, the last he played in the Football League.

=== Non-League ===
Heritage briefly joined Woking in August 1993 but after 3 appearances returned to Hastings Town for the rest of the season, moving next door to St Leonards for the 1994–95 season. In December 1995 Heritage was signed for £1,500 to Margate where he played 19 games scoring 4 goals but was released in the summer or 1996 and rejoining Sidley United. Heritage helped Sidley, who were playing in Division Two of the Sussex County Football League, gain promotion in 1999 to Division One and two seasons later as champions of Division One. Heritage stayed at Sidley as a player until 2005, although he was dual-registered with St Leonards during the 2001–02 season and had a brief stint in the Southern Football League. Heritage left the club during the 2004–05 season. He made a return to football in the 2007–08 season with Bexhill United where his son Aaron was also a goalkeeper, playing in Division Three of the Sussex County Football League he helped secure Bexhill's promotion to Division Two and helped win the Division Three Challenge Cup.

== Management and coaching ==
Whilst at Sidley United, Heritage became joint manager in 2001 after their double winning season, a role he held until 2005 when he left. Whilst at Bexhill United, a few years later, he became player-manager for the last two games of the 2008–09 season before being made assistant manager to Glyn White for the 2009–10 season. In January 2014, Heritage became a coach at Eastbourne Town, who were playing in the Premier Division of the Southern Combination Football League. In 2019 he moved to Hastings United to help with the coaching there.
