= Alan Walker (footballer) =

English footballer

Personal information
- Date of birth: 17 December 1959 (age 66)
- Place of birth: Mossley, England
- Height: 6 ft 1 in (1.85 m)
- Position: Defender

Team information
- Current team: Ashford United (Director of Football)

Youth career
- Mossley
- 1978: Stockport County

Senior career*
Years	Team	Apps	(Gls)
1978–1980	Bangor City		
1980–1983	Telford United		
1983–1985	Lincoln City	75	(4)
1985–1988	Millwall	92	(8)
1988–1992	Gillingham	151	(7)
1992	Plymouth Argyle	2	(1)
1992–1993	Mansfield Town	22	(1)
1993–1995	Barnet	59	(2)
1995–1999	Sittingbourne		
1999	St. Leonards		
2000	St. Leonards		
2000–200?	Maidstone United		

Managerial career
- 1996–1999: Sittingbourne
- 1999–2000: Fisher Athletic
- 2002–2003: Tonbridge Angels
- 2004–2006: Maidstone United (assistant)
- 2006–2010: Maidstone United
- 2024–: Ashford United
- * Club domestic league appearances and goals

Alan Walker (born 17 December 1959) is an English former professional footballer who is Director of Football at Ashford United. His clubs included Lincoln City, Millwall, and Plymouth Argyle. Walker's most notable time in the professional game was at Gillingham, where he made over 150 Football League appearances, was named Player of the Season in 1989–90, and was named in the PFA Division Four Team of the Year for 1991–92.

He has managed several non-league sides including Sittingbourne as player/manager, Tonbridge Angels, Fisher Athletic and Maidstone United. He is currently head of coaching at the Kent County Football Association.

== Honours ==
Individual

- PFA Team of the Year: 1991–92 Fourth Division
