= Ian Docker =

English footballer

Ian Docker (born 12 September 1969) is an English former professional footballer. He made over 100 appearances for Gillingham between 1987 and 1991, scoring three goals.
