= Garry Kimble =

English footballer

Personal information
- Date of birth: 6 August 1966 (age 60)
- Place of birth: Poole, England
- Positions: Forward; defender

Senior career*
Years	Team	Apps	(Gls)
1984–1986	Charlton Athletic	9	(1)
1985–1986	→ Exeter City (loan)	1	(0)
1986–1987	Cambridge United	41	(2)
1987–1989	Doncaster Rovers	65	(1)
1989	Fulham	3	(0)
1989–1991	Gillingham	48	(1)
1991–1992	Peterborough United	30	(4)
1992–1993	Dagenham & Redbridge	25	(2)
1999–2000	Ashford Town	13	(0)

Managerial career
- 2004: Tilbury
- 2008–2010: Burnham Ramblers
- 2011–2016: Witham Town
- 2018–2019: Great Wakering Rovers
- 2023–2025: Witham Town
- 2025–2026: Canvey Island
- * Club domestic league appearances and goals

Garry Kimble (born 6 August 1966) is an English former professional footballer and manager.

== Career ==
Kimble, along with his twin brother Alan, started his career as a trainee at Charlton Athletic where he made his league debut, going on to play nine times, scoring once. Both he and his brother then had brief loan spells with Exeter City before the pair of them joined Cambridge United on free transfers in July 1986.

Whilst brother Alan went on to spend seven years at The Abbey Stadium, Garry spent just over a year with the club, making 41 appearances, mainly from the left wing, and scoring twice. He was sold to Doncaster Rovers for £7,500 and went on to be a regular in their team, making 65 appearances with a solitary goal.

After a brief spell with Fulham he signed for Gillingham where he played 48 games, scoring once before moving to Peterborough United. It was while there that Kimble had his finest moment as he scored the winning goal for Posh in a 1–0 Football League Cup win over Liverpool in December 1991 to catapult him into the national sports headlines.

Following his spell with Peterborough, Kimble dropped into the non-League game and played for a number of clubs.

== Management ==
Kimble's first step into management came in February 2004, when he was appointed Tilbury manager on a caretaker basis until the end of the 2003–04 season.

Kimble left Burnham and was appointed assistant manager of Isthmian League Premier Division club Aveley in May 2010, where his twin brother, Alan was appointed as manager. In April 2011 he became manager of Witham Town. Under Kimble's stewardship Witham Town enjoyed two promotions in three years to take the club from the Essex Senior League to the Isthmian League Premier Division, although they were relegated back to Division One North of the Isthmian League at the end of the 2014–15 season. On 28 February 2016 he left the club after winning just two games out of their last 18 in the Isthmian League Division One North. In July 2018 he was appointed manager of Great Wakering Rovers. He left the club in January 2019.

In October 2025, Kimble was appointed manager of Isthmian League Premier Division club Canvey Island.

In September 2026, Kimble departed the club.
