= 1933–34 Cardiff City F.C. season =

Welsh football club season

Cardiff City
1933–34 season
- Chairman: Walter Parker
- Manager: Bartley Wilson; Ben Watts-Jones (from March 1934)
- Division Three South: 22nd
- FA Cup: 1st round
- Welsh Cup: Quarter Finals
- Third Division South Cup: 1st round
- Top goalscorer: League: Eli Postin (13); All: Eli Postin; Jim Henderson (13)
- Highest home attendance: 16,175 (v Newport County, 28 October 1933)
- Lowest home attendance: 2,660 (v Aldershot, 25 April 1934)
- Average home league attendance: 7,959
Home colours

The 1933–34 season was Cardiff City F.C.'s 15th season in the Football League. They competed in the 22-team Division Three South, then the third tier of English football, finishing bottom of the division and having to seek re-election.

== Season review ==
=== Football League Third Division South ===
==== Partial league table ====
| Pos | Team | Pld | W | D | L | GF | GA | GAv | Pts | Promotion |
|---|---|---|---|---|---|---|---|---|---|---|
| 18 | Newport County | 42 | 8 | 17 | 17 | 49 | 70 | 0.700 | 33 | |
| 19 | Bristol City | 42 | 10 | 13 | 19 | 58 | 85 | 0.682 | 33 | |
| 20 | Torquay United | 42 | 13 | 7 | 22 | 53 | 93 | 0.570 | 33 | |
| 21 | Bournemouth & Boscombe Athletic | 42 | 9 | 9 | 24 | 60 | 102 | 0.588 | 27 | Re-elected |
| 22 | Cardiff City | 42 | 9 | 6 | 27 | 57 | 105 | 0.543 | 24 | Re-elected |

=== Results by round ===
| Round | 1 | 2 | 3 | 4 | 5 | 6 | 7 | 8 | 9 | 10 | 11 | 12 | 13 | 14 | 15 | 16 | 17 | 18 | 19 | 20 | 21 | 22 | 23 | 24 | 25 | 26 | 27 | 28 | 29 | 30 | 31 | 32 | 33 | 34 | 35 | 36 | 37 | 38 | 39 | 40 | 41 | 42 |
|---|---|---|---|---|---|---|---|---|---|---|---|---|---|---|---|---|---|---|---|---|---|---|---|---|---|---|---|---|---|---|---|---|---|---|---|---|---|---|---|---|---|---|
| Ground | A | H | H | A | A | H | H | A | H | A | A | H | A | H | A | A | A | H | A | H | H | A | H | H | A | A | H | A | H | H | A | H | A | H | H | A | A | H | A | H | H | A |
| Result | W | W | D | L | W | L | W | L | W | L | L | D | L | L | L | L | L | L | L | D | W | L | L | W | L | L | L | L | L | W | D | L | L | D | L | D | L | L | W | L | L | L |
| Position | ~ | ~ | 4 | 11 | 5 | 9 | 7 | 10 | 7 | 10 | 15 | 13 | 15 | 15 | 17 | 19 | 21 | 21 | 22 | 22 | 21 | 22 | 22 | 21 | 21 | 22 | 22 | 22 | 22 | 22 | 22 | 22 | 22 | 22 | 22 | 22 | 22 | 22 | 22 | 22 | 22 | 22 |
| Points | 2 | 4 | 5 | 5 | 7 | 7 | 9 | 9 | 11 | 11 | 11 | 12 | 12 | 12 | 12 | 12 | 12 | 12 | 12 | 13 | 15 | 15 | 15 | 17 | 17 | 17 | 17 | 17 | 17 | 19 | 20 | 20 | 20 | 21 | 21 | 22 | 22 | 22 | 24 | 24 | 24 | 24 |

A = Away; H = Home; W = Win; D = Draw; L = Loss

== Players ==
First team squad. Note: Flags indicate national team as defined under FIFA eligibility rules; some limited exceptions apply. Players may hold more than one non-FIFA nationality.

| No. | Pos. | Nation | Player |
|---|---|---|---|
| -- | GK | ENG | Bob Adams |
| -- | GK | EIR | Tom Farquharson |
| -- | DF | SCO | Bob Calder |
| -- | DF | SCO | Jack Durkan |
| -- | DF | SCO | Jack Galbraith |
| -- | DF | WAL | Enoch Mort |
| -- | DF | ENG | George Russell |
| -- | MF | ENG | Leslie Adlam |
| -- | MF | SCO | John Duthie |
| -- | MF | WAL | Harold Friend |
| -- | MF | WAL | Eddie Jenkins |
| -- | MF | WAL | Ernest Lewis |
| -- | MF | SCO | Bill Marshalsey |
| -- | MF | ENG | Peter Molloy |

| No. | Pos. | Nation | Player |
|---|---|---|---|
| -- | FW | WAL | Ernie Curtis |
| -- | FW | SCO | Jim Henderson |
| -- | FW | SCO | Alex Hutchinson |
| -- | FW | WAL | Freddie Hill |
| -- | FW | SCO | Les Jones |
| -- | FW | ENG | Reg Keating |
| -- | FW | ENG | Tom Maidment |
| -- | FW | ENG | Ted Marcroft |
| -- | FW | WAL | Tommy Paget |
| -- | FW | WAL | Harry Perks |
| -- | FW | ENG | Eli Postin |
| -- | FW | WAL | Thomas Rogers |
| -- | FW | ENG | Joe West |

== Fixtures and results ==
=== Third Division South ===
| 26 August 1933 1 | Watford | 1–2 | Cardiff City | Watford |
| | Goal | | Alex Hutchinson; Alex Hutchinson | Stadium: Vicarage Road; Attendance: 11,561 |

| 28 August 1933 2 | Cardiff City | 2–0 | Reading | Cardiff |
| | Jim Henderson; Jim Henderson (pen.) | | | Stadium: Ninian Park; Attendance: 13,824 |

| 2 September 1933 3 | Cardiff City | 1–1 | Charlton Athletic | Cardiff |
| | Eli Postin | | Goal | Stadium: Ninian Park; Attendance: 15,513 |

| 6 September 1933 4 | Reading | 3–1 | Cardiff City | Reading |
| | Goal | | Tom Maidment | Stadium: Elm Park; Attendance: 9,198 |

| 9 September 1933 5 | Bournemouth | 1–3 | Cardiff City | Bournemouth |
| | Goal | | Jim Henderson; Jim Henderson; Eli Postin | Stadium: Dean Court; Attendance: 9,315 |

| 16 September 1933 6 | Cardiff City | 0–1 | Torquay United | Cardiff |
| | | | Goal | Stadium: Ninian Park; Attendance: 13,666 |

| 23 September 1933 7 | Cardiff City | 2–1 | Exeter City | Cardiff |
| | Ted Marcroft; Alex Hutchinson | | Goal | Stadium: Ninian Park; Attendance: 10,241 |

| 30 September 1933 8 | Gillingham | 6–2 | Cardiff City | Gillingham |
| | Goal | | Jim Henderson; Alex Hutchinson | Stadium: Priestfield Stadium; Attendance: 8,907 |

| 7 October 1933 9 | Cardiff City | 4–0 | Crystal Palace | Cardiff |
| | Eli Postin; Eli Postin; Les Jones; Jim Henderson | | | Stadium: Ninian Park; Attendance: 9,022 |

| 14 October 1933 10 | Bristol Rovers | 3–1 | Cardiff City | Bristol |
| | Goal | | Ted Marcroft | Stadium: Eastville; Attendance: 11,860 |

| 21 October 1933 11 | Queens Park Rangers | 4–0 | Cardiff City | London |
| | Goal | | | Stadium: Loftus Road; Attendance: 12,169 |

| 28 October 1933 12 | Cardiff City | 1–1 | Newport County | Cardiff |
| | Les Jones | | Emlyn John | Stadium: Ninian Park; Attendance: 16,175 |

| 4 November 1933 13 | Norwich City | 2–0 | Cardiff City | Norwich |
| | Goal | | | Stadium: Carrow Road; Attendance: 10,698 |

| 11 November 1933 14 | Cardiff City | 1–5 | Bristol City | Cardiff |
| | Jack Galbraith | | Syd Homer; Leo Loftus; Jimmy Heale; Gordon Reed; Gordon Reed | Stadium: Ninian Park; Attendance: 9,090 |

| 18 November 1933 15 | Clapton Orient | 4–2 | Cardiff City | London |
| | Goal | | Jim Henderson; Freddie Hill | Stadium: Brisbane Road; Attendance: 8,402 |

| 2 December 1933 16 | Brighton & Hove Albion | 4–0 | Cardiff City | Brighton |
| | Goal | | | Stadium: Goldstone Ground; Attendance: 5,612 |

| 16 December 1933 17 | Luton Town | 3–1 | Cardiff City | Luton |
| | Andy Rennie; George Martin; Hugh McGinnigle (pen.) | Luton report | Joe West | Stadium: Kenilworth Road; Attendance: 5,984; Referee: ER Westwood (Walsall) |

| 23 December 1933 18 | Cardiff City | 1–3 | Northampton Town | Cardiff |
| | Ernie Curtis (pen.) | | Goal | Stadium: Ninian Park; Attendance: 6,168 |

| 25 December 1933 19 | Coventry City | 4–1 | Cardiff City | Coventry |
| | Goal | | Tom Maidment | Stadium: Highfield Road; Attendance: 27,589 |

| 26 December 1933 20 | Cardiff City | 3–3 | Coventry City | Cardiff |
| | Eli Postin; Ernie Curtis; Charlie Bisby (o.g.) | | Goal | Stadium: Ninian Park; Attendance: 10,729 |

| 30 December 1933 21 | Cardiff City | 4–1 | Watford | Cardiff |
| | Thomas Rogers; Les Jones; Ernie Curtis; Eli Postin | | Goal | Stadium: Ninian Park; Attendance: 6,010 |

| 6 January 1934 22 | Charlton Athletic | 2–0 | Cardiff City | London |
| | Goal | | | Stadium: The Valley; Attendance: 11,020 |

| 17 January 1934 23 | Cardiff City | 0–1 | Swindon Town | Cardiff |
| | | | Frank Peters | Stadium: Ninian Park; Attendance: 2,859 |

| 20 January 1934 24 | Cardiff City | 4–2 | Bournemouth | Cardiff |
| | Jim Henderson; Jim Henderson; Joe West; Ernie Curtis | | Goal | Stadium: Ninian Park; Attendance: 4,261 |

| 27 January 1934 25 | Torquay United | 3–1 | Cardiff City | Torquay |
| | Goal | | Bill Marshalsey | Stadium: Plainmoor; Attendance: 3,091 |

| 3 February 1934 26 | Exeter City | 4–0 | Cardiff City | Exeter |
| | Goal | | | Stadium: St James Park; Attendance: 6,091 |

| 10 February 1934 27 | Cardiff City | 1–3 | Gillingham | Cardiff |
| | Eli Postin | | Goal | Stadium: Ninian Park; Attendance: 5,194 |

| 17 February 1934 28 | Crystal Palace | 3–2 | Cardiff City | London |
| | Goal | | Jim Henderson; Ernie Curtis | Stadium: Selhurst Park; Attendance: 6,290 |

| 24 February 1934 29 | Cardiff City | 1–5 | Bristol Rovers | Cardiff |
| | Eli Postin | | Goal | Stadium: Ninian Park; Attendance: 6,591 |

| 3 March 1934 30 | Cardiff City | 3–1 | Queens Park Rangers | Cardiff |
| | Jim Henderson; Jim Henderson; Ernie Curtis | | Goal | Stadium: Ninian Park; Attendance: 6,140 |

| 10 March 1934 31 | Newport County | 2–2 | Cardiff City | Newport |
| | Wally Reynolds; Billy Burgess | | Eli Postin; Eli Postin | Stadium: Somerton Park; Attendance: 10,438 |

| 17 March 1934 32 | Cardiff City | 0–2 | Norwich City | Cardiff |
| | | | Goal | Stadium: Ninian Park; Attendance: 8,630 |

| 24 March 1934 33 | Bristol City | 3–0 | Cardiff City | Bristol |
| | Joe Riley; Joe Riley; Tommy Foy | | | Stadium: Ashton Gate; Attendance: 7,186 |

| 30 March 1934 34 | Cardiff City | 1–1 | Southend United | Cardiff |
| | Eli Postin | | Goal | Stadium: Ninian Park; Attendance: 7,890 |

| 31 March 1934 35 | Cardiff City | 1–2 | Clapton Orient | Cardiff |
| | Eli Postin | | Goal | Stadium: Ninian Park; Attendance: 5,154 |

| 2 April 1934 36 | Southend United | 1–1 | Cardiff City | Southend |
| | Goal | | Eli Postin | Stadium: Roots Hall; Attendance: 9,303 |

| 7 April 1934 37 | Swindon Town | 6–3 | Cardiff City | Swindon |
| | Tommy Armstrong 3'; Tommy Armstrong 7'; Fred Fisher 30'; Fred Fisher 35'; Fred Fisher 75'; Cecil Blakemore 60' | | 15' Reg Keating; 20' Reg Keating; 85' Ernest Lewis | Stadium: County Ground; Attendance: 7,163; Referee: JM Wiltshire (Dorset) |

| 14 April 1934 38 | Cardiff City | 1–4 | Brighton & Hove Albion | Cardiff |
| | Reg Keating | | Goal | Stadium: Ninian Park; Attendance: 4,237 |

| 21 April 1934 39 | Aldershot | 1–3 | Cardiff City | Aldershot |
| | Goal | | Reg Keating; Reg Keating; Reg Keating | Stadium: Recreation Ground; Attendance: 2,484 |

| 25 April 1934 40 | Cardiff City | 1–2 | Aldershot | Cardiff |
| | Harry Perks | | Goal | Stadium: Ninian Park; Attendance: 2,660 |

| 28 April 1934 41 | Cardiff City | 0–4 | Luton Town | Cardiff |
| | | Luton report | (??) Davie Hutchison; George Martin; Buster Brown | Stadium: Ninian Park; Attendance: 3,080; Referee: ER Westwood (Walsall) |

| 5 May 1934 42 | Northampton Town | 2–0 | Cardiff City | Northampton |
| | Goal | | | Stadium: County Ground; Attendance: 2,992 |

=== FA Cup ===
| 25 November 1933 Round 1 | Cardiff City | 0–0 | Aldershot | Cardiff |
| | | | | Stadium: Ninian Park; Attendance: 12,000 |

| 29 November 1933 Round 1 (Replay) | Aldershot | 3–1 | Cardiff City | Aldershot |
| | Goal | | Freddie Hill | Stadium: Recreation Ground; Attendance: 6,000 |

=== Third Division South Cup ===
| 1 January 1934 Round 1 | Cardiff City | 0–1 | Aldershot | Cardiff |
| | | | Goal | Stadium: Ninian Park; Attendance: 3,000 |

=== Welsh Cup ===
| 14 February 1934 Round 6 | Cardiff City | 2–2 | Bristol City | Cardiff |
| | Jim Henderson; Ernie Curtis | | Goal | Stadium: Ninian Park; Attendance: 1,500 |

| 26 February 1934 Round 6 (Replay) | Bristol City | 1–0 | Cardiff City | Bristol |
| | Goal | | | Stadium: Ashton Gate; Attendance: 900 |
