= List of Cardiff City F.C. players (1–24 appearances) =

This is a list of players of Cardiff City Football Club who have made between 1 and 25 appearances for the club. The club was founded in 1899 as Riverside A.F.C. by members of a local cricket club, before changing to Cardiff City in 1907. They made their debut in the FA Cup in 1912 and were elected into the Football League eight years later in 1920, moving into their new stadium Ninian Park.

== Key ==
GK	Goalkeeper	MF	Midfielder	FW	Forward
FB	Full back	WH	Wing half	OF	Outside forward
CD	Central defender	WG	Winger	IF	Inside forward

- Players with name in italics were on loan from another club for the duration of their Cardiff career.
- Club career is defined as the first and last calendar years in which the player appeared in competitive first-team football for the club.
- Total appearances and goals comprise those in the Football Alliance, Premier League, Football League games, FA Cup, Football League Cup, FAW Cup, Play-offs, European Cup Winners' Cup, friendlies and war-time games are excluded.
- Substitute appearances are included.
- Statistics are correct as of 2 May 2026.

== List ==
Players who represented their country while at the club.

Name	Nationality	Position	Years	Appearances	Goals	Notes	Refs
Laurence Abrams	England	MF	1920	1	0		
Bob Adams	England	GK	1932–1933	11	0		
Ebou Adams	Gambia	DF	2023–2024	12	0		
Tom Adeyemi	England	MF	2014–2017	23	1		
Leslie Adlam	England	FB	1933	4	0		
Albert Adomah	Ghana	FW	2020	9	0	(Note: Nottingham Forest)	
Gareth Ainsworth	England	WG	2003	9	0		
Fergie Aitken	Scotland	WG	1922	2	0		
Sandy Allan	Scotland	FW	1967–1969	12	4		
Chris Allen	England	MF	1998	4	0		
Will Alves	England	FW	2025	15	1	(Note: Leicester City)	
Ben Amos	England	GK	2016–2017	16	0	(Note: Bolton Wanderers)	
Ernie Anderson	Scotland	WH	1921	1	0		
Reg Anderson	England	IF	1938	2	1		
Byron Anthony	Wales	CD	2001–2006	4	2		
Cameron Antwi	England	MF	2024	1	0		
Roger Ashton	England	GK	1947	1	0		
Len Attley	Wales	IF	1934–1935	12	2		
Jim Baillie	Scotland	WH	1926–1927	5	0		
Ian Baird	England	FW	1983–1984	12	6	(Note: So←uthampton)	
Paul Bannon	Republic of Ireland	FW	1984	4	0	(Note: Bristol Rovers)	
Keith Barber	England	GK	1978	2	0	(Note: Swansea City)	
Leon Barnett	England	DF	2013	8	0	(Note: Norwich City)	
Jazzi Barnum-Bobb	England	FB	2014–2016	1	0		
John Bartlett	Wales	FB	1933	1	0		
Josh Beecher	England	DF	2024	1	0		
Gary Bellamy	England	CD	1992	9	0	(Note: Wolverhampton Wanderer)	
Xavier Benjamin	England	DF	2023	2	0		
Filip Benković	Croatia	DF	2020	1	0		
Mickey Bennett	England	WG	1996–1997	17	1		
Jo Inge Berget	Norway	SS	2014–2015	2	0		
Don Bird	England	OF	1929–1931	13	4		
Ralph Blakemore	Wales	FB	1930	1	0		
Harry Bland	England	DF	1934–1935	8	0		
Ernie Blenkinsop	England	FB	1937–1939	10	0		
Omar Bogle	England	FW	2017–2019	24	4		
Mirko Bolesan	Italy	MF	1995	1	0		
Michael Boulding	England	FW	2005	4	0	(Note: Barnsley)	
Sam Bowen	Wales	MF	2021	4	0		
Alastair Brack	Scotland	FB	1962–1963	2	0		
Kevin Brock	England	MF	1994	14	2	(Note: Newcastle United)	
Andy Brown	Scotland	FW	1936–1938	3	0		
Ciaron Brown	Northern Ireland	DF	2019–2022	19	0		
Jim Brown	Scotland	GK	1982–1983	3	0		
Jonathan Brown	Wales	WG	2007–2009	4	1		
Tommy Brown	England	FW	1921	2	0		
Craig Bryson	Scotland	MF	2017–2018	22	2	(Note: Derby County)	
Guido Burgstaller	Austria	MF	2014–2015	5	1		
Marshall Burke	Scotland	MF	1984	3	0	(Note: Lincoln City)	
Micky Burns	England	FW	1978–1979	6	0		
Deon Burton	Jamaica	FW	1996–1997	4	2	(Note: Portsmouth)	
Gerry Byrne	Scotland	MF	1977–1978	18	0		
Jason Byrne	Republic of Ireland	FW	2007–2008	11	1		
Stephen Bywater	England	GK	2002, 2011	10	0	(Note: West Ham United)	
Nathan Cadette	Wales	MF	1997–1998	6	0		
Juan Cala	Spain	CD	2014	11	2		
Dennis Callan	Wales	WH	1955	1	0		
Hugh Campbell	Scotland	OF	1936	1	0		
Kevin Campbell	England	FW	2006–2007	21	1		
Ernie Carless	Wales	IF	1932	1	0		
Willie Carlin	England	MF	1973–1974	22	1		
John Carver	England	MF	1985–1986	13	0		
Fred Castle	Wales	FW	1926–1927	3	0		
Marouane Chamakh	Morocco	CF	2016	2	0		
James Chambers	England	FB	2006	7	0	(Note: Watford)	
Derrick Christie	England	WG	1985–1986	21	2		
Stacy Coldicott	England	MF	1996	6	0	(Note: West Bromwich Albion)	
Elvet Collins	Wales	WG	1923–1926	12	0		
Jack Collins	England	OF	1932–1933	7	0		
Raheem Conte	England	MF	2024	5	0		
David Corner	England	DF	1985–1986	6	0		
John Cornforth	England	MF	1999	13	1		
Andreas Cornelius	Denmark	FW	2013–2014	11	0		
John Cornwell	England	DF	1993	5	2		
Alan Couch	Wales	MF	1971–1972	12	0		
Luke Coulson	England	FB	2012–2014	1	0		
Jack Court	Wales	IF	1938–1939	1	0		
Cameron Coxe	Wales	DF	2017–2020	4	0		
Andy Crawford	England	FW	1983–1984	9	3		
Glen Crowe	Republic of Ireland	FW	1997	8	1		
Greg Cunningham	Ireland	DF	2018–2021	14	0		
Tavio Kouakou D'Almeida	Ivory Coast	MF	2021	1	0		
Jesper Daland	Norway	DF	2024–	23	0		
Vontae Daley-Campbell	England	FB	2022	2	0		
Ray Daniel	Wales	DF	1957–1958	6	0		
Jermaine Darlington	England	FB	2005–2006	10	0		
Bryn Davies	Wales	IF	1935–1937	10	0		
Gareth M Davies	England	CD	1997	6	2	(Note: Crystal Palace)	
Gareth R Davies	Wales	FW	1986–1987	3	0		
Jim Davies	Wales	OF	1938	1	0		
John Davies	Wales	GK	1978–1979	9	0		
Lyn Davies	Wales	GK	1965–1968	16	0		
Paul Davies	England	FW	1978–1980	2	0		
Stan Davies	Wales	IF/OF	1928–1929	14	2		
Tom Davies	Wales	DF	2021–2025	2	0		
Joe Day	England	GK	2019	2	0		
Jack Deighton	England	GK	1935–1936	19	0		
Ken DeMange	Republic of Ireland	MF	1990–1991	15	0	(Note: Hull City)	
Oliver Denham	Wales	DF	2021–2022	8	0		
Jack Diamond	England	FW	1935–1936	20	10		
Famara Diédhiou	Senegal	FW	2024	16	2	(Note: Granada)	
Cecil Dixon	England	OF	1954–1957	21	1		
Gerald Dobbs	England	MF	1995	3	0	(Note: Wimbledon)	
Axel Donczew	Wales	FW	2025–	2	0		
Alfie Doughty	England	MF	2022	9	1	(Note: Stoke City)	
Keith Downing	England	MF	1995	4	0		
Eoin Doyle	Republic of Ireland	FW	2015–2016	18	5		
Tommy Doyle	England	MF	2022	20	2	(Note: Manchester City)	
Cody Drameh	England	DF	2022	22	0	(Note: Leeds United)	
Danny Drinkwater	England	MF	2010–2011	12	0	(Note: Manchester United)	
Frank Dudley	England	CF	1953	5	1		
Jack Durkan	Scotland	FB	1933–1934	6	0		
Joe Durrell	England	OF	1975	2	0	(Note: Bristol City)	
John Duthie	Scotland	WH	1933–1934	15	0		
Brian Edgley	England	IF	1960–1961	10	1		
Harry Egan	England	FW	1938–1939	18	9		
Mark Elliott	Wales	MF	1979–1980	8	0		
Jay Emmanuel-Thomas	England	MF	2011	16	2	(Note: Arsenal)	
Scott Endersby	England	GK	1987–1988	4	0		
Jack Eslor	Scotland	FB	1936	3	0		
Kelvin Etuhu	Nigeria	WG/FW	2009–2010	20	0		
Albert Evans	Wales	WH	1931–1933	22	1		
Alex Evans	Wales	CD	2011–2012	1	0		
Andy Evans	Wales	FW	1993–1995	15	0		
Kieron Evans	Wales	MF	2021–2024	11	0		
Len Evans	Wales	GK	1930–1933	8	0		
Les Evans	Wales	OF	1950–1951	3	1		
Paul Evans	Wales	FW	1983	3	1		
Rollo Evans	Wales	WH	1932	1	0		
Sidney Evans	England	OF	1920–1923	9	1		
Terry Evans	Wales	FB	1993–1995	14	0		
Trevor Evans	Wales	OF	1937	1	0		
Malachi Fagan-Walcott	England	DF	2024	3	0		
Fan Zhiyi	China	CD	2002–2003	6	0		
Ibrahim Farah	Wales	MF	2011–2012	1	0		
Liam Feeney	England	MF	2017–2018	16	0	(Note: Blackburn Rovers)	
Warren Feeney	Northern Ireland	FW	2007–2010	22	0		
David Felgate	Wales	GK	1984	4	0		
Andrea Ferretti	Italy	FW	2005–2007	11	0		
Jim Finlay	Scotland	OF	1937	1	0		
Steve Finnieston	Scotland	FW	1974	9	2	(Note: Chelsea)	
Nicky Fish	Wales	MF	2001–2006	3	0		
Steve Flack	England	FW	1995–1996	11	1		
Stuart Fleetwood	Wales	FW	2003–2006	15	1		
Will Foley	England	FW	1985–1986	12	1		
Francis Ford	Wales	DF	1984	2	0		
David Forde	Republic of Ireland	GK	2007–2008	8	0		
Robbie Fowler	England	FW	2007–2008	16	6		
Gerry Francis	England	MF	1984	7	0		
Peter Francombe	Wales	DF	1981	3	0		
Gordon Fraser	Scotland	FW	1962–1963	4	0		
Kerim Frei	Turkey	WG/MF	2012	3	0	(Note: Fulham)	
Harold Friend	Wales	WH	1933	3	0		
Syd Fursland	Wales	FW	1934	2	0		
Colin Gale	Wales	DF	1950–1956	12	0		
Adeteye Gbadehan	England	DF	2024	1	0		
Ernie Gault	England	FW	1920	2	0		
Alex Gilchrist	Scotland	OF	1948	1	0		
Luey Giles	Wales	FB	2024–	14	1		
Martyn Giles	Wales	FB	2000–2003	7	1		
Ryan Giles	England	MF	2022	21	0		
Gary Gill	England	MF	1991–1992	6	1		
Luigi Glombard	France	FW	2006–2007	7	0		
Don Godwin	Wales	OF	1956	2	0		
Martin Goldsmith	Wales	MF	1983–1984	9	2		
Dean Gordon	England	FB	2001	7	1	(Note: Middlesbrough)	
Ted Gorin	Wales	FW	1948–1950	6	2		
Andy Gorman	Wales	DF	1991–1992	14	1		
Frédéric Gounongbe	Benin	CF	2016–2018	15	0		
Ben Graham	Wales	CD	1993	1	0		
Alick Gray	Scotland	FB	1958	2	0		
Julian Gray	England	MF	2003	9	0		
Matt Green	England	FW/WG	2007–2008	7	0		
Ryan Green	Wales	DF	2002	1	0	(Note: Millwall)	
Chris Greenacre	England	FW	1997	11	2		
David Greene	England	DF	2000–2001	11	0		
Phil Griffiths	England	MF	1934–1935	12	1		
Stan Griffiths	Wales	IF	1934	2	2		
Wyn Griffiths	Wales	GK	1947	1	0		
Marko Grujić	Serbia	MF	2018	14	1	(Note: Liverpool)	
Javi Guerra	Spain	FW	2014–2015	5	0		
Alfie Hagan	England	FW	1923–1925	9	2		
Richard Haig	Wales	ST	1988–1990	5	0		
Tommy Halliday	Scotland	FW	1963–1964	17	2		
David Hamilton	England	MF	1985	10	0		
Tommy Hampson	England	GK	1927–1929	8	0		
Alan Harper	England	FB	1995	6	0	(Note: Burnley)	
James Harper	England	MF	2000–2001	3	0		
Gary Harris	England	MF	1978–1979	4	0		
Gordon Harris	Scotland	FB	1964	5	0		
Neil Harris	England	FW	2004–2005	3	1		
Gerry Harrison	England	MF	1992	10	1		
James Harrison	England	IF	1937	1	0		
George Hazlett	Scotland	OF	1952–1953	7	1		
Rhys Healey	England	CF	2013–2019	16	1		
Hugh Hearty	Scotland	FB	1935–1936	18	0		
Phil Heath	England	WG	1990–1991	11	1		
Mick Henderson	England	DF	1982	11	0		
Charlie Hill	Wales	IF	1938–1947	20	3		
Joe Hillier	Wales	GK	1927–1929	9	0		
Joe Hills	England	GK	1924–1925	17	0		
Graham Hogg	Wales	FW	1948	2	0		
Matt Holmes	England	MF	1989	1	0	(Note: Bournemouth)	
Stan Holt	England	CD	1931	2	0		
Chris Honor	England	CD	1995	10	0		
Dean Horrix	England	FW	1987	9	3	(Note: Reading)	
Ralph Horton	Wales	IF	1932	1	0		
David Houston	Scotland	WH	1965–1966	21	0		
Mark Howard	England	GK	2006–2007	2	0		
Roger Hoy	England	CD	1971–1973	17	0		
Kirk Huggins	Wales	DF	2004–2005	1	0		
David Hughes	Wales	DF	2001–2003	19	0		
Jamie Hughes	England	ST	1999–2000	5	2		
Mike Hughes	Wales	MF	1958	1	0		
Jordan Hugill	England	FW	2022	19	4		
Ritchie Humphreys	England	FB	1999–2000	10	2	(Note: Sheffield Wednesday)	
Steve Humphries	England	GK	1982	1	0		
Emyr Huws	Wales	DM	2016–2017	4	0		
Uche Ikpeazu	Uganda	FW	2022	13	3		
Junichi Inamoto	Japan	MF	2005	16	0		
Chris Ingram	Wales	MF	1995–1996	11	1		
Godfrey Ingram	England	ST	1982–1983	11	2		
Billy Jackson	England	MF	1934	13	0		
Joe Jacobson	Wales	FB	2005–2007	3	0		
Billy James	Wales	FW	1946–1947	7	4		
Tom James	Wales	FB	2014–2016	1	0		
Nathaniel Jarvis	Wales	FW	2011–2013	3	2		
Leon Jeanne	Wales	MF	2001–2002	2	0		
Isaac Jefferies	England	FW	2024	1	0		
Eddie Jenkins	Wales	FB	1921–1923	13	0		
Steve Jenkins	Wales	DF	2003	4	0		
Emlyn John	Wales	CD	1928–1931	15	0		
Martin John	England	FB	2010–2011	1	0		
Glenn Johnson	Australia	FW	1995–1996	5	0		
Alan Jones	Wales	GK	1957	1	0		
Bernard Jones	England	IF	1955–1956	9	0		
Bryn Jones	Wales	MF	1966–1969	3	0		
Charlie Jones	Wales	WG	1920–1921	1	0		
David Jones	Wales	OF	1934–1935	10	0		
Gethin Jones	Wales	DF	2001–2003	5	0		
Glyn Jones	Wales	IF	1934–1935	1	0		
Ian Jones	Wales	FB	1993–1995	3	0		
Jimmy Jones	Wales	FW	1923–1924	12	2		
Ken Jones	England	FB	1971–1972	10	0		
Vaughan Jones	Wales	DF	1984–1985	11	0		
Vince Jones	Wales	WH	1922	1	0		
Andy Jordan	England	DF	2000–2003	6	0		
Alan Judge	England	GK	1987	8	0	(Note: Oxford United)	
Sory Kaba	Guinea	FW	2023	17	8	(Note: Midtjylland)	
Malvin Kamara	England	MF	2006–2007	16	1		
Wilfried Kanga	Ivory Coast	FW	2024	16	0	(Note: Hertha BSC)	
George Kelly	Scotland	IF	1958–1959	8	4		
Nyrere Kelly	England	FW	1992–1993	5	1		
Seamus Kelly	Republic of Ireland	GK	1998–2000	13	0		
Matthew Kennedy	Scotland	WG	2015–2018	22	0		
Andy Keogh	Republic of Ireland	FW	2010–2011	18	2		
Steve Ketteridge	England	MF	1988–1989	6	2		
Dave Kevan	Scotland	MF	1989	7	0	(Note: Notts County)	
Eli King	Wales	MF	2021–2024	8	0		
Gerry King	Wales	MF	1964	6	0		
Jack Kingdon	Scotland	DF	2025	3	0		
Alan Knill	England	CD	1993	4	0	(Note: Bury)	
Harry Knowles	England	OF	1958–1959	8	0		
Dimitrios Konstantopoulos	Greece	GK	2009	6	0	(Note: Coventry City)	
Toni Koskela	Finland	MF	2005–2006	4	0		
Rickie Lambert	England	CF	2016–2017	19	4		
Bob Lamie	England	IF	1949–1950	6	1		
Simon Lappin	Scotland	WG	2012–2014	2	0	^{P}	
George Latham	Wales	DF	1921	1	0		
Liam Lawrence	Republic of Ireland	MF	2012–	15	1		
Tom Lawrence	Wales	WG	2016	14	0		
Trevor Lee	England	FW	1983–1984	21	5		
Arran Lee-Barrett	England	GK	2003–2005	3	0		
Carleton Leonard	England	FB	1985	6	0		
Billy Lewis	Wales	OF	1946–1947	10	0		
David Lewis	Wales	IF	1934	2	0		
Ernest Lewis	Wales	IF	1933–1934	14	1		
Jack Lewis	Wales	DF	1924–1925	1	0		
Joe Lewis	England	GK	2012–2016	5	0		
Terry Lewis	Wales	WH	1968–1969	4	0		
Wilfred Lievesley	England	FW	1929–1930	3	0		
Kyle Lightbourne	Bermuda	FW	2001	3	0		
Clive Lloyd	Wales	IF	1964	3	0		
Kevin Lloyd	England	FW	1979	1	0		
Ian Love	Wales	FW	1958	2	0		
Rohan Luthra	England	GK	2023	1	0		
Ken MacDonald	Wales	FW	1921–1922	12	7		
Kevin MacDonald	Scotland	MF	1990–1991	8	0		
Ian MacLean	Scotland	DF	1994	4	0	^1	
Steve MacLean	Scotland	FW	2007–2008	18	1		
Dakarai Mafico	Wales	MF	2025–	4	0		
Josh Magennis	Northern Ireland	FW	2007–2010	10	1		
Alan Mahon	Republic of Ireland	MF	2003	15	2		
Bill Main	England	WH	1936–1938	8	0		
Dick Mallory	Bermuda	MF	1963	3	0		
Sivert Mannsverk	Norway	MF	2025	15	0	(Note: Ajax)	
Marwood Marchant	Wales	FW	1950–1951	12	3		
Paul Marriott	England	FW	1991	1	0		
Ernie Marshall	England	WH	1946	1	0		
Bill Marshalsey	Scotland	WH	1933–1934	8	1		
Mick Martin	Republic of Ireland	MF	1984–1985	7	0		
Fred Mason	England	FB	1922	1	0		
Wayne Matthews	Wales	MF	1983–1984	17	0		
Harry May	Scotland	FB	1949	1	0		
Alfred Mayo	Wales	FW	1930	1	0		
Conor McAleny	England	FW	2015	9	2	(Note: Everton)	
Bob McAuley	Scotland	FB	1936–1937	4	0		
Seamus McBennett	Ireland	MF	1947–1948	4	2		
Danny McCarthy	Wales	MF	1960	9	0		
John McClelland	Northern Ireland	DF	1974	4	1		
Charles McDonagh	England	WH	1935	2	0		
Curtis McDonald	Wales	MF	2006–2007	4	2		
Brian McGorry	England	MF	1996	7	0	(Note: Wycombe Wanderers)	
Allan McGregor	Scotland	GK	2017	19	0		
George McGuckin	Scotland	MF	1957	4	0		
Paddy McIlvenny	Ireland	FW	1924	5	2		
Jimmy McInch	Scotland	FW	1972–1975	13	0		
Jack McJennett	Wales	FB	1929–1931	7	0		
Nick McKoy	England	MF	2006–2007	1	0		
Bobby McLaren	Scotland	IF	1949	1	0		
John McMillan	Scotland	OF	1957–1958	2	0		
Owen McNally	Scotland	FW	1931	6	0		
Ray McStay	Scotland	MF	1996	1	0		
Ibrahim Meite	England	CF	2017	2	0		
Eugene Melaniphy	Ireland	FW	1936–1938	20	8		
James Melville	Scotland	FB	1921	1	0		
Ross Menzies	Scotland	FB	1957	1	0		
Bill Merry	Wales	IF	1930–1931	8	0		
James Michael	Wales	MF	1996	1	0		
Albert Miles	Wales	FW	1927–1929	17	8		
Idris Miles	Wales	OF	1930	3	0		
Don Mills	England	IF	1950	1	0		
Paul Milsom	England	FW	1994	3	0		
Jimmy Mitchell	Wales	OF	1937–1938	4	0		
Steve Mokone	South Africa	ST	1959	3	1		
Beriah Moore	Wales	FW	1947–1948	7	4		
Billy Moore	Wales	WH	1934–1935	12	0		
Paddy Moore	Ireland	CD	1929	1	0		
Shamar Moore	England	FW	2019	1	0		
Simon Moore	England	GK	2013–2016	24	0		
Paul Moreno	Wales	MF	2026–	1	0		
Peter Morgan	Wales	FB	1972–1973	17	0		
Aaron Morris	Wales	CD	2007–2010	4	0		
Eric Morris	Wales	FB	1931–1932	18	0		
Ted Morris	Wales	GK	1948–1950	8	0		
Ravel Morrison	England	MF	2014	7	0		
Frank Moss	England	WH	1928–1929	9	0		
Pat Mountain	Wales	GK	1996–1998	6	0		
Carl Muggleton	England	GK	2001	6	0		
Phil Mulryne	Northern Ireland	MF	2005–2006	5	0		
Jim Munro	Scotland	FW	1928–1929	16	3		
Brian Murphy	Republic of Ireland	GK	2016–2020	10	0		
Jerry Murphy	Wales	IF	1927	1	0		
Pat Murphy	Wales	WH	1965	1	0		
Gerry Nardiello	Wales	FW	1985–1986	7	4		
Guylain Ndumbu-Nsungu	DR Congo	MF	2006	12	0		
Billy Newton	England	WH	1920–1921	6	0		
Eddie Newton	England	MF	1992	18	4		
Frank Newton	England	CF	1911–1914	4	0		
Oumar Niasse	Senegal	FW	2019	13	0		
Joe Nibloe	Scotland	FB	1948	1	0		
Jack Nicholls	Wales	IF	1924–1925	2	0		
Johnny Nicholls	England	FW	1957	8	2		
Ryan Nicholls	Wales	WG	1995	12	2		
Niels Nkounkou	France	FB	2023	18	0		
Jack Nock	England	IF	1921–1922	3	0		
Kurt Nogan	Wales	ST	2000–2001	20	1		
Griff Norman	Wales	FB	1951	1	0		
Ben Nugent	England	CB	2012–2015	14	1		
Gordon Nutt	England	WG	1954–1955	17	4		
Tanatswa Nyakuhwa	Wales	DF	2025–	9	0		
Michael Oakes	England	GK	2007–2008	15	0		
Ken Oakley	Wales	FW	1950–1953	7	1		
Tim O'Connor	Wales	MF	1985	2	0		
Peter Odemwingie	Nigeria	FW	2013–2014	17	2		
Keith O'Halloran	Republic of Ireland	MF	1996–1997	8	0		
Neil O'Halloran	Wales	FW	1955–1956	10	4		
Gary O'Neil	England	MF	2004	9	1		
Harry O'Neill	England	FB	1931–1932	11	4		
Jordi Osei-Tutu	England	DF	2020–2021	9	0		
Adedeji Oshilaja	England	FB	2012–2017	3	0		
Gabriel Osho	Nigeria	DF	2025–	22	0		
Russell Osman	England	CD	1996	15	0		
Tommy O'Sullivan	Wales	MF	2012–2017	3	0		
Davie Ovenstone	England	OF	1936–1937	22	4		
Quincy Owusu-Abeyie	Ghana	WG	2009	4	0	(Note: Spartak Moscow)	
Rob Page	Wales	CD	2004–2005	9	0		
Tommy Paget	Wales	FW	1932–1933	6	0		
Jonathan Panzo	England	DF	2023–2024	5	0		
Harry Parfitt	Wales	FB	1953	1	0		
Reg Parker	Wales	CF	1947–1948	2	0		
Jon Parkin	England	FW	2011	15	2		
Michael Parkins	Wales	MF	2004–2005	1	0		
Daniel Parslow	Wales	CD	2005–2006	1	0		
Frank Parsons	England	GK	1970–1972	20	0		
John Parsons	Wales	FW	1968–1973	15	6		
Scott Paterson	Scotland	DF	1997	5	0		
Luke Pearce	Ireland	FW	2025	3	0		
John Pearson	England	FW	1995	12	0		
Gordon Pembery	Wales	WH	1949–1950	1	0		
Harry Perks	Wales	OF	1933	9	1		
Troy Perrett	Wales	MF	2025–	4	1		
Joe Phillips	Wales	FB	1946	2	0		
Lee Phillips	Wales	FB	1996–2000	20	0		
Nat Phillips	England	DF	2024	18	1		
Tony Pickrell	Wales	OF	1960–1961	21	4		
Albert Pinxton	Wales	IF	1936–1937	23	3		
Tom Pirie	Scotland	WH	1926–1927	5	0		
Jim Platt	Northern Ireland	GK	1978–1979	4	0		
Andy Polycarpou	England	MF	1981	7	0		
Cliff Powell	England	FB	1989	1	0		
Allen Price	Wales	FB	1985	2	0		
Cecil Price	Wales	OF	1948	1	0		
Johnny Rainford	England	IF	1953	3	1		
Iwan Redan	Netherlands	FW	2007	3	0	(Note: Willem II)	
Doug Redwood	Wales	OF	1935–1936	13	0		
Ebor Reed	England	CD	1925	6	0		
George Reid	Ireland	CF	1922–1923	7	4		
Michael Reindorf	England	FW	2024	4	0		
Arthur Rhodes	England	IF	1938	5	0		
Len Richards	Wales	FB	1932	1	0		
Percy Richards	Wales	OF	1926	4	0		
Kieran Richardson	England	WG	2016	6	0		
Michael Ricketts	England	FW	2005–2006	17	5		
Chris Riggott	England	CD	2010–2011	2	0		
Joe Roberts	England	OF	1935–1936	23	5		
Jon Roberts	Wales	GK	1987–1989	12	0		
Matt Robinson	England	FW	1928–1930	20	2		
Keith Robson	England	MF	1977–1978	21	5		
Chris Rodon	Wales	ST	1983	4	0	(Note: Brighton & Hove Albion)	
Tom Rogers	Wales	OF	1933	2	1		
Jimmy Rollo	England	DF	1996–1998	20	1		
Bernard Ross	Wales	OF	1946–1947	8	2		
Wayne Routledge	England	WG	2008–2009	9	2	(Note: Aston Villa)	
Alf Rowland	England	CD	1948–1949	3	0		
Rúnar Alex Rúnarsson	Iceland	GK	2023	8	0		
Kevin Russell	England	FW	1991	3	0		
Derek Ryder	England	FB	1966	4	0		
Kevin Sainte-Luce	Guadeloupe	WG	2012–2013	1	0		
Jlloyd Samuel	Trinidad and Tobago	FB	2011	7	0		
Chris Sander	Wales	GK	1985–1986	14	0		
Alan Sanders	Wales	MF	1981	2	0		
Dion Sanderson	England	DF	2020	10	0		
Tom Sang	England	MF	2020–2022	16	0		
Dean Saunders	Wales	ST	1985	4	0		
Calum Scanlon	England	DF	2026	8	0		
Kasper Schmeichel	Denmark	GK	2007	14	0		
Jörn Schwinkendorf	Germany	DF	1999–2000	5	0		
Andy Scott	England	FB	1994–1996	18	1		
Bill Scott	Ireland	FB	1936–1937	20	0		
Bob Scott	Scotland	WH	1957	3	0		
Morrys Scott	Wales	FW	1989–1990	9	0		
Tony Scully	Republic of Ireland	WG	1996	14	0		
John Seasman	England	MF	1984–1985	16	2		
Robin Semark	England	FW	1991	7	0		
Jai Semenyo	Ghana	DF	2022	1	0		
Richard Sendall	England	FW	1989	4	0		
Frank Sharp	Scotland	WG	1969–1970	14	1		
Paul Shaw	England	AM	1995	6	0		
William Shaw	England	FW	1928	2	0		
Steve Sherlock	England	FB	1986–1987	18	0		
Tony Simmons	England	FW	1986	5	1		
James Simmonds	Republic of Ireland	MF	2007	1	0		
Michael Simpkins	England	FB	2001–2002	20	0		
Jack Simpson	England	DF	2022–2023	23	0		
Brad Smith	Australia	DF	2020	3	0		
Cecil Smith	Wales	CF	1936–1937	16	8		
James Smith	England	CD	1936–1937	13	0		
Matt Smith	England	CD	2007–2008	2	0		
Ritchie Smith	Scotland	OF	1938	16	2		
Sam Smith	England	IF	1925–1927	4	0		
Will Spiers	Wales	DF	2025	2	1		
Andy Spring	England	FB	1985	1	0		
Alf Steel	England	GK	1949	10	0		
Eric Steele	England	GK	1982	7	0		
Lee Stephens	Wales	FW	1990	4	0		
Albert Stitfall	Wales	DF	1948–1952	7	1		
Paul Sugrue	England	FW	1981–1982	5	0		
Kevin Summerfield	England	MF	1984	12	1		
David Summerhayes	Wales	MF	1965–1967	15	0		
Chris Summers	Wales	FW	1990	3	0		
Maurice Swan	Republic of Ireland	GK	1960–1962	19	0		
Bobby Taggart	Scotland	IF	1949	2	0		
Solomon Taiwo	Nigeria	MF	2009–2012	11	0		
Gabriel Tamas	Romania	CD	2015	1	0		
Rob Tanciewicz	Wales	MF	2025–	2	0		
Billy Taylor	England	MF	1922–1924	6	0		
Mark Taylor	England	ST	1992	6	3	(Note: Blackpool)	
Peter Taylor	England	MF	1990	6	3		
Sid Taylor	Wales	OF	1934	1	0		
Stuart Taylor	England	GK	2009	8	0		
Jim Tennant	Scotland	MF	1932	2	0		
Danny Thomas	Wales	FW	2004–2005	2	0		
Martin Thomas	Wales	GK	1982	15	0		
Peter Thomas	Wales	MF	1953–1954	5	1		
Walter Thomas	England	OF	1952–1953	9	4		
Andy Thompson	England	FB	2000–2002	11	0		
Chris Thompson	England	MF	1990	2	0		
Bobby Tobin	Wales	IF	1947	2	0		
Cameron Toshack	Wales	FW	1991–1992	5	0		
Chris Townsend	Wales	FW	1983–1984	7	0		
Armand Traoré	Senegal	DF	2018	3	1		
Ken Tucker	Wales	MF	1956–1957	13	0		
Steve Tupling	England	MF	1988–1989	5	0		
Billy Turnbull	England	FW	1922	1	0		
Ross Turnbull	England	GK	2008	8	0		
Charles Turner	Wales	FB	1936	2	0		
Matthew Turner	Wales	GK	2025–	8	0		
Cody Twose	Wales	MF	2025–	2	0		
Harry Tyrer	England	GK	2026–	2	0		
Frank Tysoe	England	MF	1926	2	0		
Iké Ugbo	Canada	FW	2023	22	4	(Note: Troyes)	
Jamie Unsworth	England	FB	1990–1991	5	0		
Jim Upton	Scotland	FB	1963	7	0		
Albert Valentine	England	ST	1920–1930	16	3		
Isaac Vassell	England	FW	2019	3	1		
Tommy Vaughan	Wales	IF	1934–1935	14	4		
Tony Vaughan	England	DF	1999	14	0		
Etien Velikonja	Slovenia	ST	2012–2016	5	0		
Leigh Vick	Wales	MF	1994–1995	4	0		
Haris Vučkić	Slovenia	MF	2012	5	1		
James Waite	Wales	MF	2019	1	0		
Lee Walker	Wales	MF	1993	1	0		
Phil Walker	England	FW	1983–1984	2	0		
Alan Walsh	England	ST	1992	1	0		
Ian Walsh	Wales	FW	1987–1989	17	4		
Simon Walton	England	MF	2007	7	0	(Note: Charlton Athletic)	
Tony Watt	Scotland	CF	2015	9	2		
Jamie Ward	Northern Ireland	WG	2018	4	0		
Paul Ware	England	MF	1996–1997	5	0		
Tom Ware	Wales	FB	1930–1931	14	0		
Marley Watkins	Wales	FW	2021	1	2		
Phil Watkins	Wales	WH	1963	1	0		
Bill Watson	Wales	FB	1947	1	0		
Max Watters	England	FW	2021–2022	22	1		
Bobby Weale	Wales	OF	1930–1931	5	0		
Arthur Welsby	Wales	OF	1936–1937	3	0		
Joe West	England	FW	1933–1934	6	2		
Theo Wharton	Wales	MF	2012–2017	2	0		
Jack Whitham	England	FW	1974–1975	14	3		
Fred Whitlow	England	FW	1934	8	1		
Connor Wickham	England	FW	2023	12	1		
Aaron Wildig	England	MF	2009–2012	21	1		
Yanic Wildschut	Netherlands	WG	2018	8	0		
Chris Williams	Wales	FW	1977	3	0		
Danny Williams	Wales	FW	1935–1936	20	10		
Darren Williams	England	MF	2004–2005	20	0	(Note: Sunderland)^{[P]}	
John Williams	England	DF	1991–1993	6	0		
Jonny Williams	Wales	MF	2021	9	0		
Noah Williams	Wales	FW	2026–	2	0		
Tom Williams	Wales	CD	1937–1938	6	0		
Ben Wilson	England	GK	2014–2018	4	0		
Tom Wilson	England	FB	1930	1	0		
Josh Wilson-Esbrand	England	DF	2024	11	0		
Jack Winspear	England	OF	1966	1	0		
Magnus Wolff Eikrem	Norway	CM	2014	9	0		
Terry Wood	Wales	WH	1946	6	0		
Jon Woods	Wales	FW	1984	1	0		
Billy Woof	England	FW	1982	1	1		
Lee Worgan	Wales	GK	2005–2006	1	0		
Alan Wright	England	CD	2006–2007	7	0		
Eddie Youds	England	DF	1989	1	0		
Wilfried Zaha	England	WG	2014	13	0		
Chanka Zimba	England	FW	2021	1	0		
Peter Zoïs	Australia	GK	1998	1	0		

== Footnotes ==
Player statistics include games played while on loan from:

- ^{P} – Players have been loaned to Cardiff before moving permanently.
- ^2 Ian MacLean joined twice on loan in the same season from Bristol Rovers.
