= List of Cardiff City F.C. players (25–99 appearances) =

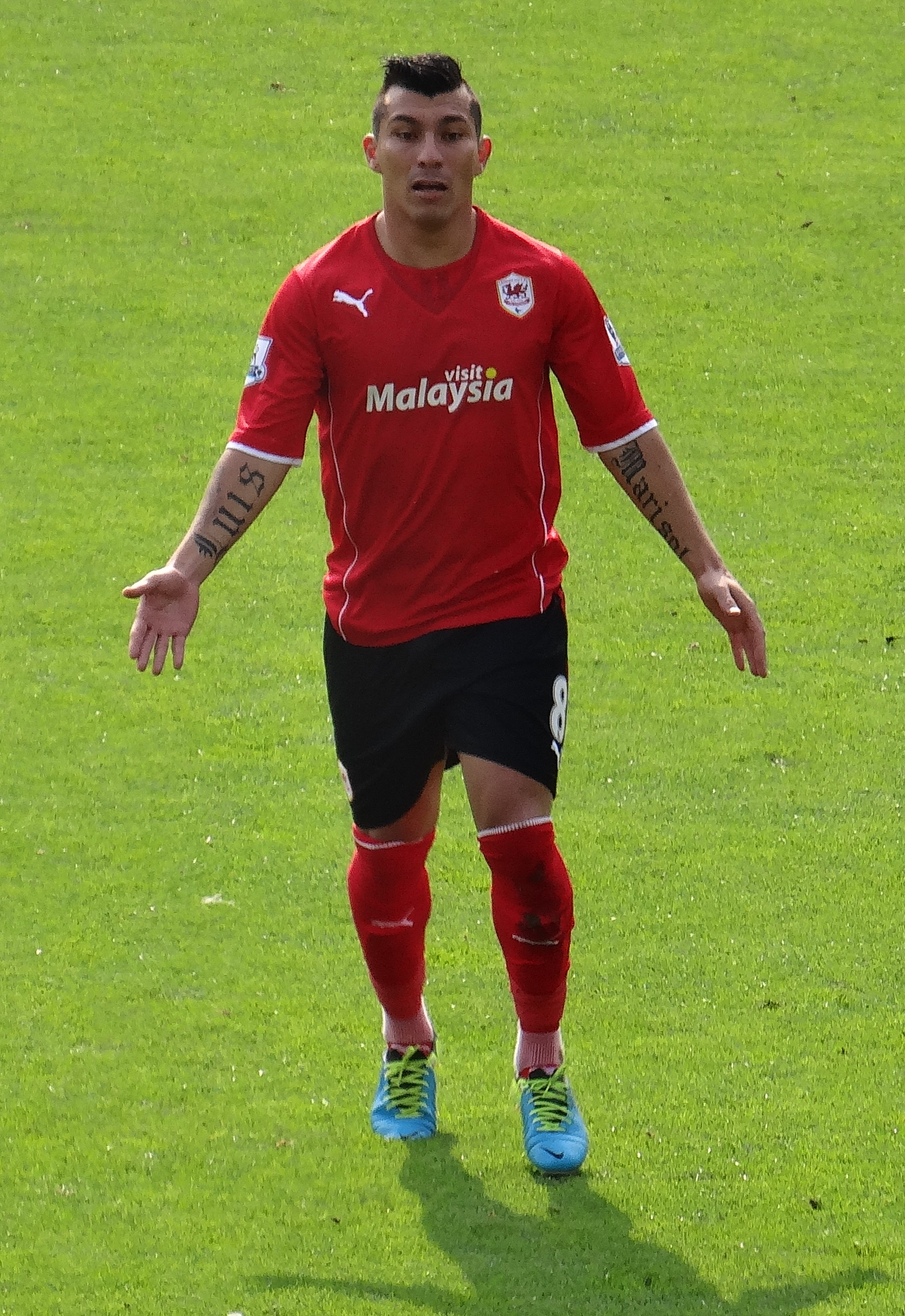
Cardiff set club transfer fee records when buying Gary Medel in 2013 and selling him a year later.

Cardiff City Football Club is a professional association football club based in Cardiff, Wales. The club was founded in 1899 as Riverside A.F.C., by members of a local cricket club, joining the Cardiff & District League the following year. In 1907, the side joined the South Wales Amateur League and changed its name to Cardiff City, later entering the English football league system by joining the Southern Football League in 1910, before being elected into the Football League in 1920. As of the end of the 2017–18 season, the club has won three division titles in the Football League, won promotion on 12 occasions and been relegated 12 times. The club has also achieved some success in domestic cup competitions, winning the FA Cup in 1927, reaching the final on two other occasions, reaching the 2012 League Cup final and winning the Welsh Cup on 22 occasions.

All players who have played between 25 and 99 first-team matches for the club, either as members of the starting eleven or as substitutes, are listed below. Each player's details include the duration of his career with Cardiff, his typical playing position while with the club, and the number of matches played and goals scored in all senior competitive matches.

No player has finished his Cardiff career on 99 appearances, Patrick Cassidy and Tom Sloan both reached 98 appearances before leaving the club. Sloan is one of three players who played between 25 and 99 games who appeared in the club's 1927 FA Cup Final winning team, the others being Ernie Curtis and Sam Irving. Two players, Davy McDougall and Richie Morgan, went on to manage the team. McDougall was appointed as the club's first manager in 1910 and remained in the role until the following year. Morgan managed the side between 1978 and 1981 before moving into another role at the club. Despite only appearing in 25 matches for Cardiff, Robin Friday is regarded as one of the most notable cult heroes in the club's history due to his performances and his personality. Stan Richards set a club record for the most league goals in a single season with 30 in 1946–47 as the team won promotion from the Third Division South, which stood for 56 years until it was beaten by Robert Earnshaw.

In more recent years, notable players with between 25 and 99 appearances for the club include Andy Campbell, who scored the winning goal in the 2003 Football League Second Division play-off final, and Chilean midfielder Gary Medel, who set club transfer fee records on both his arrival in 2013 and his departure the following year. Aaron Ramsey, who spent three spells with the club, remains the youngest player ever to play for the club after making his debut at the age of 16 years and 123 days.

As of May 2026, 13 players listed here are still with the club, so have the opportunity to add to their totals.

== Key ==
- Players are arranged by alphabetical order of surname.
- Appearances as a substitute are included. This feature of the game was introduced in the Football League at the start of the 1965–66 season.
- Statistics are correct as of the match played on 2 May 2026.

Positions key (Note: For more information, see Formation.)
Pre-1960s		1960s–	
GK	Goalkeeper		
FB	Full back	DF	Defender
HB	Half back	MF	Midfielder
FW	Forward		

Nationality
Unless otherwise noted, the nationality of a player is determined by the country/countries which he has played for, or if said person has not played international football, his country of birth.
Position
Playing positions are listed according to the tactical formations that were employed at the time. Thus, the change in the names of defence and midfield positions reflects the tactical evolution that occurred from the 1960s onwards.
Club career
Club career is defined as the first and last calendar years in which the player appeared for the club in any of the competitions listed below.
Total appearances and Total goals
Total appearances and goals comprise those in the Southern Football League, Football League, Premier League, FA Cup, Football League Cup, Welsh Cup, Football League Trophy, Football League Third Division South Cup and FA Charity Shield as well as European matches in the European Cup Winners Cup. Wartime fixtures are not included. Due to the unavailability of complete statistics, seasons prior to 1910 in the amateur Welsh leagues are not included.

Key
Symbol	Meaning
‡	Player still at the club
*	Player represented his country at international level during his time at the club

== List ==
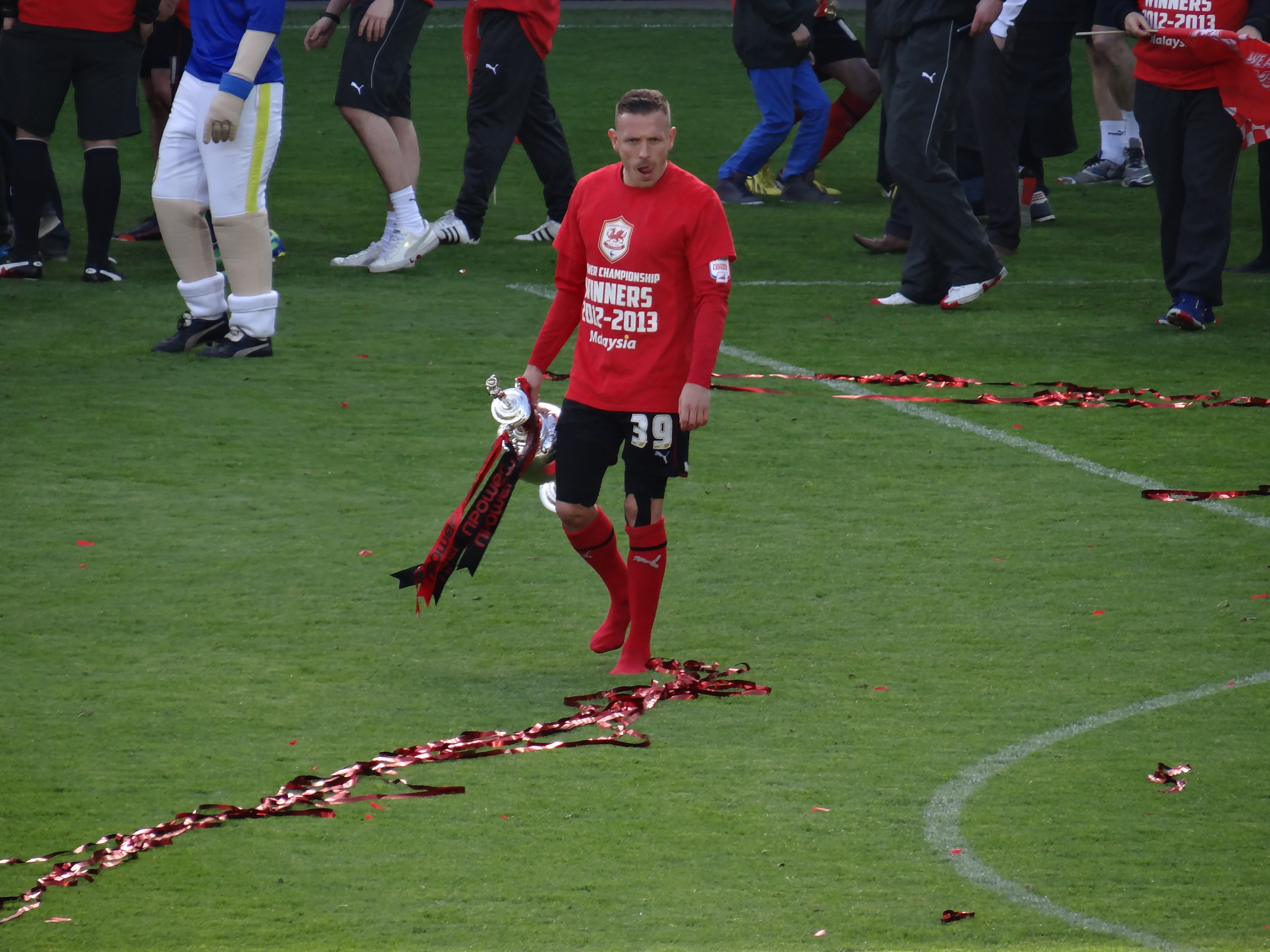
Craig Bellamy celebrating after helping Cardiff win the 2012–13 Championship

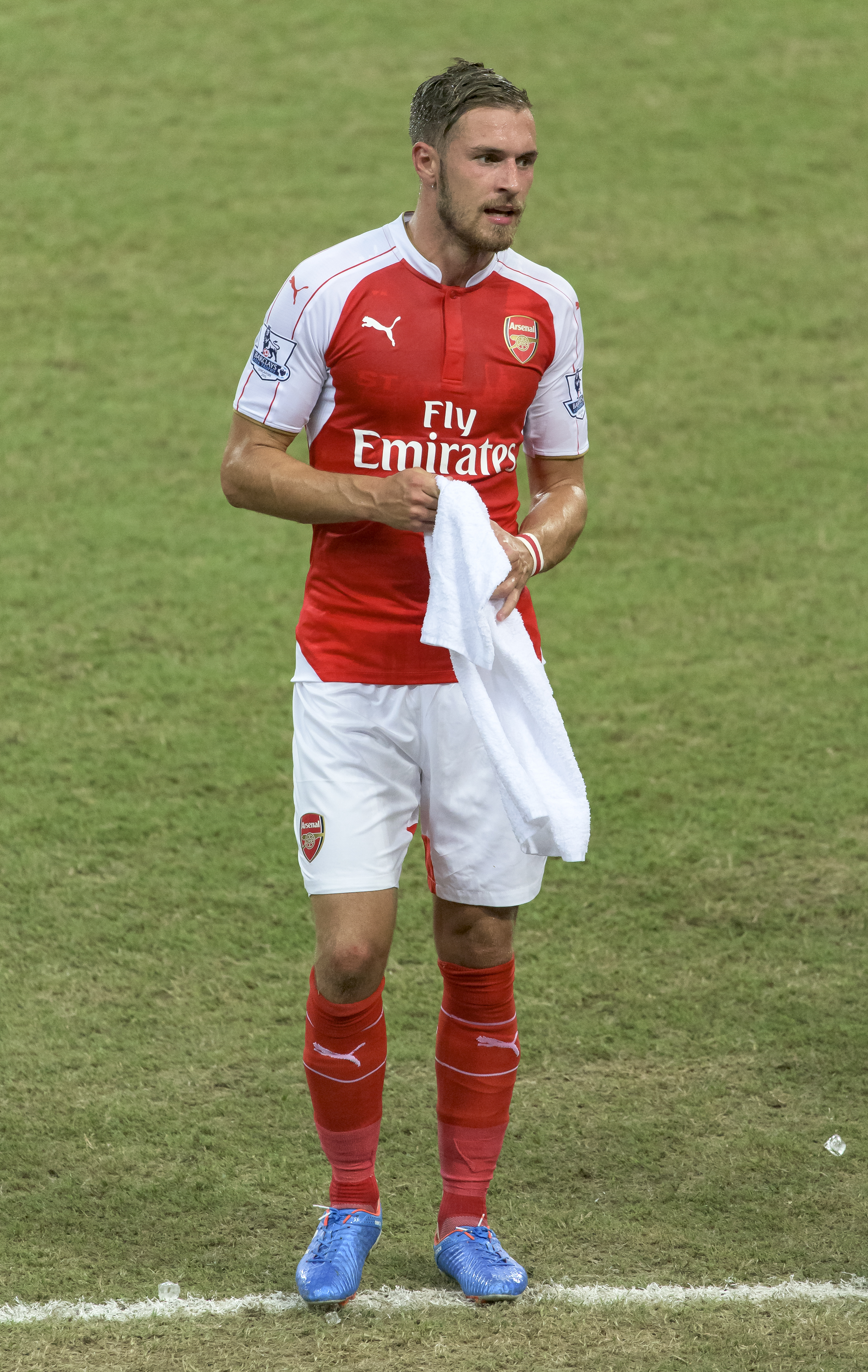
Aaron Ramsey spent three spells with the club and remains the youngest player in the club's history.

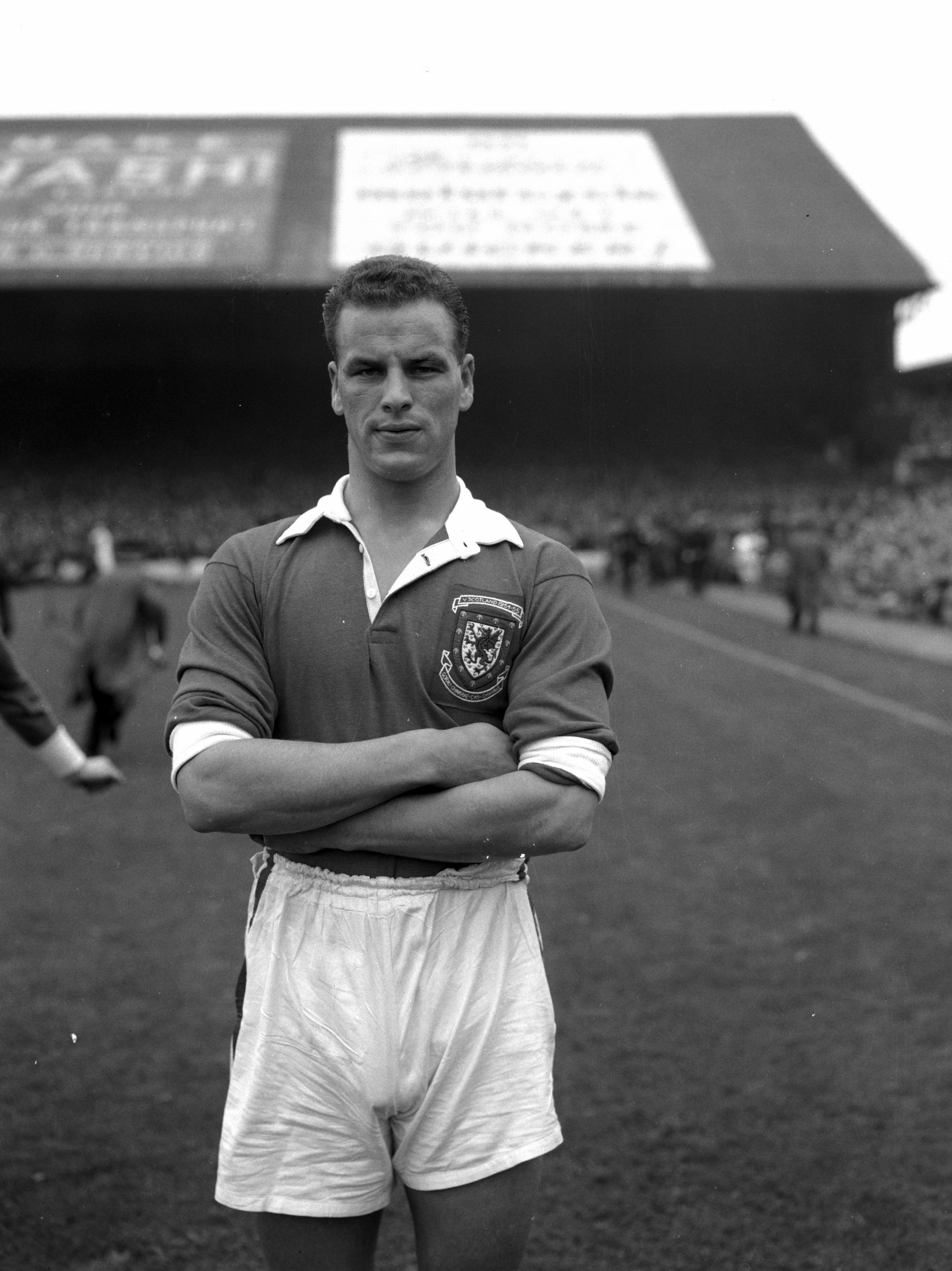
John Charles, considered one of Wales' greatest ever players, made 89 appearances for Cardiff.

Player	Nationality	Position	Club career	Appearances (Note: Statistics are sourced from the general references listed below to the date of publication. Players featuring after those dates are sourced from their Soccerbase profile listed in the notes column.)	Goals	Notes
Tom Abley	England	HB	1910–1913	51	11	
Darren Adams	England	FW	1994–1996	47	7	
Mark Aizlewood	Wales*	DF	1994–1995	57	3	
Kevin Aherne-Evans	Wales	MF	2000–2002	35	5	
Bryn Allen	Wales	FW	1945–1947 & 1948–1949	66	23	
Ryan Allsop	England	GK	2022–2023	44	0	
Jak Alnwick	England	GK	2022–2025	63	0	
Adrian Alston	Australia	FW	1975–1976	65	24	
Sammy Ameobi	England	MF	2015–2016	38	1	
George Andrews	England	FW	1965–1967	50	26	
Neal Ardley	England	MF	2005–2006	41	1	
Harry Arter	Republic of Ireland*	MF	2018–2019	25	0	
Cian Ashford‡	Wales	FW	2023–	84	9	
George Ballsom	Wales	FB	1938–1939	47	0	
Leigh Barnard	England	MF	1989–1991	83	11	
Albert Barnett	England	FB	1914–1924	66	7	
Phil Bater	Wales	DF	1987–1989	97	0	
Harry Beadles	Wales*	FW	1924–1925	40	16	
Chris Beech	England	FB	1997–1998	53	1	
Craig Bellamy	Wales*	FW	2010–2011 & 2012–2014	91	18	
Dave Bennett	England	MF	1981–1983	91	20	
Tommy Best	Wales	FW	1948–1949	30	12	
Paul Bodin	Wales	FB	1982–1985	94	4	
Joe Bonson	England	FW	1957–1960	85	43	
Josh Bowler	England	FW	2023–2024	39	5	
John Brayford	England	FB	2013–2015	30	0	
Paul Brayson	England	FW	2000–2002	94	20	
Matt Brazier	England	MF	1998–2002	79	7	
Phil Brignull	England	DF	1985–1987	57	0	
Bobby Brown	England	FW	1966–1968	64	30	
Lee Bullock	England	MF	2004–2005	37	8	
George Burton	England	FW	1910–1914	53	22	
John Burton	England	FW	1911–1914	86	31	
Bob Calder	Scotland	FB	1933–1934	42	0	
Víctor Camarasa	Spain	MF	2018–2019	33	5	
Andy Campbell	England	FW	2002–2006	96	19	
Fraizer Campbell	England	FW	2013–2014	52	16	
Danny Canning	Wales	GK	1945–1949	83	0	
Tony Capaldi	Northern Ireland*	FB	2007–2010	77	0	
Richard Carpenter	England	MF	1998–2000	89	2	
Tony Carss	England	MF	1997–1998	50	1	
Arthur Cashmore	England	FW	1919–1921	55	26	
Joe Cassidy	Scotland	FW	1925–1926	28	7	
Patrick Cassidy	England	DF	1912–1920	98	13	
Steven Caulker	England	DF	2013–2014	39	5	
Calum Chambers‡	England	DF	2024–	73	5	
Jeff Chandler	England	MF	1989–1990	34	1	
Clive Charles	England	DF	1974–1977	85	5	
John Charles	Wales*	DF/FW	1963–1966	89	18	
Mel Charles	Wales*	HB	1962–1965	95	32	
Ken Chisholm	Scotland	FW	1952–1953	66	35	
Joe Clark	England	FW	1919–1921	31	9	
Malcolm Clarke	Scotland	MF	1967–1969	62	5	
Roy Clarke	Wales	MF	1942–1947	43	11	
James Collins	Wales*	DF	2000–2005	86	6	
James Collins	Republic of Ireland*	FW	2021–2022	30	3	
Jamilu Collins	Nigeria*	FB	2022–2024	43	1	
Jimmy Collins	England	FW	1937–1939	94	49	
Joel Colwill‡	Wales	MF	2023–	50	6	
Miguel Comminges	Guadeloupe*	FB	2008–2011	35	0	
Craig Conway	Scotland*	MF	2011–2014	67	6	
Kevin Cooper	England	MF	2005–2008	45	2	
Bill Corkhill	England	MF	1938–1939	31	0	
Don Cowie	Scotland*	MF	2011–2014	97	9	
Neil Cox	England	DF	2005–2006	29	2	
William Cox	England	FW	1919–1920	27	5	
Stan Cribb	England	FW	1932–1933	31	11	
Gary Croft	England	FB	2002–2005	87	3	
Ernie Curtis	Wales	FW	1926–1927 & 1933–1935	76	17	
Wayne Curtis	Wales	FB	1985–1986	35	2	
Mats Møller Dæhli	Norway*	MF	2014–2015	26	1	
Loïc Damour	France	MF	2017–2019	33	0	
Ray Daniel	England	MF	1989–1990	72	1	
Ben Davies	England	GK	1920–1923	95	0	
Isaak Davies‡	Wales	FW	2021–	88	12	
Ron Davies	Wales	FB	1952–1958	36	3	
Willie Davies	Wales*	FW	1924–1928	90	17	
Norman Dean	England	FW	1967–1968	30	8	
Mark Delaney	Wales	FB	1998–1999	36	0	
Steve Derrett	Wales*	DF	1967–1972	85	1	
William Devlin	England	FW	1912–1920	59	30	
Andy Dibble	Wales	GK	1982–1984	72	0	
Tom Doncaster	England	DF	1912–1915	69	1	
Peter Donnelly	England	FW	1960–1961	36	11	
Jack Duffy	England	DF	1910–1912	51	1	
Alan Durban	Wales	MF	1959–1963	60	13	
Jim Eadie	Scotland	GK	1969–1973	60	0	
Trevor Edwards	Wales	FB	1960–1964	85	4	
Anwar El Ghazi	Netherlands	FW	2024–2025	27	3	
Tony Elliott	England	GK	1996–1997	44	0	
Keith Ellis	England	FW	1964–1965	27	10	
Karl Elsey	Wales	MF	1983–1985	70	6	
Peter Enckelman	Finland*	GK	2008–2010	42	0	
Mike England	Wales	DF	1975–1976	48	1	
Kion Etete‡	England	FW	2022–	62	9	
Elfed Evans	Wales	FW	1949–1952	54	21	
Jack Everest	Ireland	FB	1933–1935	77	5	
Fábio	Brazil	FB	2014–2016	68	1	
Winston Faerber	Suriname	FB	1999–2000	43	1	
John Farrington	England	MF	1973–1974	30	7	
Mark Farrington	England	FW	1985–1986	36	4	
Harry Featherstone	England	FW	1911–1913	41	22	
Wayne Fereday	England	MF	1994–1995	46	2	
Bill Fielding	England	GK	1936–1939	65	0	
Will Fish‡	England	DF	2024–	69	2	
Haydn Fleming	England	FB	1995–1997	35	0	
Aden Flint	England	DF	2019–2022	93	12	
Willo Flood	Republic of Ireland	MF	2006–2009	30	1	
Brian Flynn	Wales	MF	1984–1985	37	2	
Alan Foggon	England	MF	1971–1973	27	4	
Louis Ford	Wales	FB	1936–1938	41	0	
Robin Friday	England	FW	1976–1977	25	7	
John Frowen	Wales	DF	1952–1958	39	0	
Chris Fry	Wales	MF	1988–1991	65	1	
Steve Gammon	Wales	MF	1958–1965	77	1	
Jimmy Gardner	Scotland	MF	1995–1996	72	5	
Anthony Gerrard	England	DF	2009–2012	73	4	
Rudy Gestede	Benin*	FW	2011–2014	64	9	
Colin Gibson	England	FW	1946–1948	75	16	
Kerrea Gilbert	England	FB	2006–2007	27	0	
Tim Gilbert	England	FB	1980–1982	36	1	
Paul Giles	Wales	MF	1980–1983	29	1	
Robert Glatzel	Germany	FW	2019–2021	58	11	
Arthur Goddard	England	FW	1914–1915	32	8	
Gavin Gordon	England	MF	2000–2004	56	13	
Dimitrios Goutas	Greece	DF	2023–2025	81	5	
David Grant	England	FB	1983–1984	29	1	
Karlan Grant	England	FW	2023–2024	40	6	
Mark Grew	England	GK	1992–1993	35	0	
Peter Grotier	England	GK	1973 & 1979–1981	45	0	
Jason Gummer	Wales	MF	1985–1989	44	5	
Chris Gunter	Wales*	FB	2006–2008	35	0	
Gábor Gyepes	Hungary*	DF	2008–2012	74	5	
Greg Halford	England	FB	2017–2018	33	1	
Des Hamilton	England	MF	2001–2003	35	1	
Paul Harding	England	GK	1995–1997	43	0	
Terry Harkin	Northern Ireland	FW	1965–1966	33	13	
Kadeem Harris	England	MF	2012–2019	79	7	
Mark Harris	England	MF	1997–1998	45	1	
Mark Harris	Wales*	FW	2017–2023	95	10	
Jimmy Floyd Hasselbaink	Netherlands	FW	2007–2008	44	9	
Bob Hatton	England	FW	1982–1983	30	9	
Simon Haworth	Wales*	FW	1995–1997	46	10	
Pat Heard	England	DF	1990–1992	56	4	
Tom Heaton	England	GK	2008–2009 & 2010–2012	64	0	
Heiðar Helguson	Iceland	FW	2012–2013	39	9	
Thomas Helsby	England	HB	1928–1931	52	3	
Jeff Hemmerman	England	FW	1982–1983	63	26	
Jim Henderson	Scotland	FW	1932–1933	50	29	
Ron Hewitt	Wales*	FW	1957–1959	73	32	
Danny Hill	England	MF	1998–2001	76	7	
Freddie Hill	Wales	FW	1932–1935	77	16	
Derek Hogg	England	FW	1960–1963	49	9	
Peter Hooper	England	FW	1962–1963	45	24	
Len Hopkins	England	FW	1913–1920	40	14	
Ethan Horvath	United States*	GK	2024–2025	36	0	
Colin Hudson	Wales	HB	1957–1960	73	12	
Iorwerth Hughes	Wales	GK	1951–1952	27	0	
Wayne Hughes	Wales	MF	1979–1981	55	2	
Bill Hullett	England	FW	1947–1948	27	15	
Thomas Husbands	England	GK	1910–1912	49	0	
Alexander Hutchinson	Scotland	MF	1933–1934	26	4	
John Impey	England	FB	1972–1974	29	2	
Lex Immers	Netherlands	MF	2016–2017	28	5	
Sam Irving	Ireland*	FW	1926–1928	62	5	
Robbie James	Wales	MF	1992–1993	68	3	
Brian Jenkins	Wales	HB	1956–1960	35	10	
Eddie Jenkins	Wales	HB	1930–1933	81	0	
Wally Jennings	England	HB	1933–1935	35	0	
Cameron Jerome	England	FW	2004–2006	79	27	
Declan John	Wales*	FB	2012–2017	47	0	
Eddie Johnson	United States*	FW	2008–2009	33	2	
George Johnston	Scotland	FW	1964–1967	81	34	
Bob Jones	England	GK	1937–1939	66	0	
Islwyn Jones	Wales	HB	1954–1955	29	0	
Ken Jones	Wales	GK	1957–1958	29	0	
Kenwyne Jones	Trinidad and Tobago*	FW	2014–2016	67	19	
Mark Jones	England	MF	1990–1991	50	6	
Albert Keating	England	FW	1931–1932	50	26	
Reg Keating	England	FW	1934–1936	75	36	
Dekel Keinan	Israel*	DF	2011–2012	25	2	
Billy Kellock	Scotland	MF	1971–1973	49	5	
Omari Kellyman	England	FW	2025–2026	42	11	
Jim Kelso	Scotland	DF	1938–1939	55	0	
Mark Kennedy	Republic of Ireland	FB	2008–2010	76	0	
Andy Kerr	England	DF	1986–1987	42	1	
Kim Bo-Kyung	South Korea*	MF	2012–2015	64	3	
Jake King	England	FB	1985–1986	32	0	
Johnny King	England	FW	1961–1962	35	7	
Cédric Kipré	Ivory Coast	DF	2022–2023	43	3	
Harry Kirtley	England	FW	1955–1957	45	4	
Filip Kiss	Slovakia	MF	2011–2016	36	1	
Peter Kitchen	England	FW	1980–1982	77	28	
Phil Kite	England	GK	1993–1994	25	0	
Jason Koumas	Wales*	MF	2005–2006 & 2010–2011	74	15	
Ronan Kpakio‡	Wales	DF	2024–	44	2	
Edward Lane	England	FB	1934–1935	34	0	
Richard Langley	Jamaica*	MF	2003–2005	73	8	
Dylan Lawlor‡	Wales	DF	2024–	39	2	
Richard Lawrie	England	DF	1910–1912	57	1	
Denis Lawson	Scotland	MF	1923–1926	81	2	
Edward Layton	England	DF	1914–1921	70	0	
Richard Leah	England	DF	1911–1914	63	0	
Jock Leckie	Scotland	GK	1934–1935	53	0	
Alan Lee	Republic of Ireland*	FW	2003–2006	97	13	
Adam Le Fondre	England	FW	2014–2016	25	3	
Allan Lewis	Wales	DF	1988–1991	64	0	
Wilf Lewis	Wales	FW	1934–1935	40	8	
Kevin Lloyd	Wales	FB	1996–1998	40	1	
Josh Low	England	MF	1999–2002	86	6	
Steve Lynex	England	MF	1988–1990	82	4	
Paul Maddy	Wales	MF	1980–1983 & 1989	48	4	
Gary Madine	England	FW	2018–2020	28	0	
Tom Maidment	England	FW	1933–1936	46	8	
Scott Malone	England	FB	2015–2016	56	2	
Jack Mansell	England	DF	1952–1953	29	0	
Ted Marcroft	England	HB	1933–1934	31	2	
Steve Mardenborough	England	MF	1987–1988	39	1	
Martyn Margetson	Wales*	GK	2002–2007	43	0	
Chris Marustik	Wales	MF	1985–1987	61	6	
Frank Matson	Wales	FW	1926–1930	29	3	
Adam Matthews	Wales*	FB	2009–2011	48	1	
Neil Matthews	Northern Ireland	FB	1990–1992	85	2	
Nicky Maynard	England	FW	2012–2015	26	3	
Leyton Maxwell	Wales	FW	2001–2004	46	1	
Jobi McAnuff	Jamaica	MF	2004–2005	48	3	
Cecil McCaughey	England	HB	1937–1939	82	6	
Ross McCormack	Scotland*	FW	2008–2010	88	30	
Andrew McCulloch	England	FW	1972–1974	74	33	
Scott McCulloch	Scotland	DF	2000–2002	27	1	
Brian McDermott	England	MF	1987–1988	68	11	
John McDonald	England	DF	1910–1911	26	2	
Davy McDougall	Scotland	HB	1910–1911	26	0	(Note: Includes spell as player-manager.)
Jimmy McGrath	England	MF	1928–1932	40	0	
Mark McGuinness	Republic of Ireland	DF	2021–2024	86	6	
John McKenzie	England	DF	1910–1911	26	0	
Bobby McLaughlin	Northern Ireland	HB	1950–1953	56	3	
Paul McLoughlin	England	MF	1984–1986	58	4	
John McSeveney	Scotland	MF	1955–1957	86	23	
Kevin Meacock	England	FW	1984–1985	29	3	
Gary Medel	Chile*	MF	2013–2014	35	0	
Yakou Méïté	Ivory Coast	FW	2023–2025	71	5	
Jack Mellor	England	FB	1937–1939	31	0	
Nathaniel Mendez-Laing	England	MF	2017–2020	92	14	
Kenny Miller	Scotland*	FW	2011–2012	50	11	
Graham Mitchell	England	DF	1998–1999	54	0	
Peter Molloy	England	HB	1934–1935	25	0	
Kieffer Moore	Wales*	FW	2020–2022	66	25	
Ronnie Moore	England	FW	1979–1980	61	6	
Jon Morgan	Wales	MF	1988–1990	74	3	
Richie Morgan	Wales	DF	1966–1977	89	0	
Enoch Mort	Wales	DF	1933–1937	48	0	
Graham Moseley	England	GK	1986–1988	49	0	
Josh Murphy	England	MF	2018–2021	98	14	
Jordon Mutch	England	MF	2012–2014	60	7	
Harry Nash	England	FW	1920–1922	33	8	
Lee Naylor	England	FB	2010–2012	37	2	
Ron Nicholls	England	GK	1958–1960	58	0	
Joe Nicholson	England	HB	1924–1926	57	14	
Tommy Northcott	England	FW	1952–1955	85	19	
Charlie Oatway	England	MF	1994–1995	40	1	
Sheyi Ojo	England	MF	2020–2021; 2022–2024	83	7	
Callum O'Dowda	Republic of Ireland*	FW	2022–2025	94	6	
Stuart O'Keefe	England	MF	2015–2019	45	2	
Seyi Olofinjana	Nigeria	MF	2010–2011	42	6	
Gordon Owen	England	MF	1983–1984	47	18	
Jack Page	England	FB	1920–1926	86	0	
Fred Pagnam	England	FW	1920–1921	27	8	
Scott Partridge	England	FW	1997–1998	42	4	
Trevor Peck	Wales	FB	1958–1964	53	0	
Dave Penney	England	MF	1997–1998	44	5	
Russell Perrett	England	DF	1999–2001	35	2	
Dillon Phillips	England	GK	2020–2023	36	0	
Tony Philliskirk	England	FW	1995–1998	67	5	
Jaden Philogene	England	FW	2022–2023	39	5	
Gary Plumley	England	GK	1983–1985	29	0	
George Poland	Wales	GK	1935–1936 & 1946	29	0	
Bob Pollard	England	FB	1932–1933	35	0	
Eli Postin	England	FW	1933–1934	38	13	
David Powell	Wales	DF	1972–1974	46	1	
James Prescott	England	MF	1936–1938	37	10	
Spencer Prior	England	DF	2001–2004	96	5	
Paul Quinn	Scotland	FB	2009–2012	61	1	
Aaron Ramsey	Wales*	MF	2006–2008; 2011; 2023–2025	51	6	
Frank Rankmore	Wales	DF	1957–1963	77	0	
Kevin Ratcliffe	Wales*	DF	1992–1993	31	1	
Mel Rees	Wales	GK	1984–1987	38	0	
Nigel Rees	Wales	MF	1970–1972	38	2	
Bobby Reid	England	FW	2018–2019	30	5	
Alex Revell	England	FW	2015–2016	30	3	
Brayley Reynolds	Wales	FW	1956–1959	60	16	
Jazz Richards	Wales*	FB	2016–2020	57	0	
Stan Richards	Wales*	FW	1946–1948	59	39	
Tex Rickards	England	FW	1938–1939	26	8	
Harold Riley	England	FW	1934–1936	68	15	
Andy Rinomhota	Zimbabwe*	MF	2022–2025	82	0	
Walter Robbins	Wales*	FW	1928–1931	96	42	
Christian Roberts	Wales	FW	1997–1999	32	3	
Dave Roberts	Wales	DF	1978–1981	46	2	
Alex Robertson‡	Australia	MF	2024–	76	10	
John Robinson	Wales	MF	2003–2005	43	3	
Alan Rogers	England	MF	1986–1987	35	1	
Mahlon Romeo	Antigua and Barbuda*	DF	2022–2024	51	0	
Peter Ronan	Scotland	HB	1931–1932	38	1	
Harry Roper	England	FW	1935–1936	33	2	
George Russell	England	FB	1932–1933	65	1	
Yousef Salech‡	Denmark	FW	2025–	63	24	
Paul Sanderson	England	MF	1987–1988	28	2	
Tom Sang	England	MF	2020–2023	27	0	
Andy Saville	Wales	FW	1997–1999	42	15	
Romaine Sawyers	Saint Kitts and Nevis*	MF	2022–2024	45	3	
Riccardo Scimeca	England	MF	2006–2010	77	6	
Dick Scott	England	MF	1963–1965	44	5	
Trevor Sinclair	England	MF	2007–2008	27	2	
Manolis Siopis	Greece*	MF	2023–2025	64	0	
Tom Sloan	Ireland*	MF	1924–1929	98	1	
Lee Smelt	England	GK	1984–1985	52	0	
Colin Smith	England	DF	1983–1985	59	3	
George Smith	England	MF	1973–1975	54	1	
Harold Smith	England	HB	1935–1937	55	3	
John Smith	Scotland	FB	1930–1932	67	0	
Potter Smith	England	FW	1925–1929	50	10	
Tommy Smith	England	MF	2012–2014	26	1	
Ernie Stevenson	England	FW	1948–1950	56	17	
Ron Stockin	England	FW	1954–1957	64	20	
Gareth Stoker	England	MF	1997–1999	46	4	
Colin Sullivan	England	DF	1979–1981	70	1	
Kévin Théophile-Catherine	France	FB	2013–2015	30	0	
Dai Thomas	Wales	FW	1998–2000	36	5	
Garry Thompson	England	FW	1993–1995	65	9	
Lee Tomlin	England	MF	2017–2021	56	11	
Harry Tracey	England	FW	1911–1914	72	17	
Nathan Trott‡	England	GK	2025–	46	0	
David Turnbull‡	Scotland	MF	2024–	84	4	
Burt Turner	England	FW	1937–1938	49	22	
Robbie Turner	England	FW	1985–1986	48	10	
Tony Vidmar	Australia*	FB	2003–2005	82	2	
Tony Villars	Wales*	MF	1971–1976	94	5	
Johnny Vincent	England	MF	1972–1975	84	14	
Mark Walton	Wales	GK	2000–2003	48	0	
Alan Warboys	England	FW	1970–1972	79	29	
Dai Ward	Wales*	FW	1954 & 1961–1962	41	20	
Danny Ward	England	FW	2017–2020	68	12	
Gavin Ward	England	GK	1989–1993	75	0	
George Wardle	England	FW	1946–1948	42	12	
Tony Warner	England	GK	2004–2006	30	0	
Fred Warren	Wales*	FW	1927–1930	39	8	
Johnny Watkins	England	FW	1959–1961	73	18	
Paul Went	England	DF	1976–1978	91	11	
Gareth Whalley	England	MF	2002–2004	47	2	
Steve White	England	FW	1996–1998	77	19	
Jeff Whitley	Northern Ireland	MF	2005–2008	38	1	
Gavin Whyte	Northern Ireland*	MF	2019–2023	53	2	
Nathan Wigg	Wales	MF	1993–1995	72	1	
David Williams	England	GK	1994–1996	82	0	
John Williams	England	FW	1998–1999	51	16	
Ralph Williams	Wales	FW	1929–1930	32	17	
Steve Williams	Wales	GK	1993–1997	45	0	
Chris Willock‡	England	MF	2024–	82	10	
Harry Wilson	Wales*	MF	2020–2021	38	7	
Graham Withey	England	FW	1984–1986	31	8	
George Wood	Scotland	GK	1987–1990	92	0	
