= Hugh Campbell (disambiguation) =

Hugh Campbell (born 1941) is a former American football and Canadian football player, coach, and executive.

Hugh Campbell may also refer to:

- Sir Hugh Campbell (1615–1686), Scottish baronet of Cessnock in Ayrshire
- Sir Hugh Campbell of Calder (died 1716), member of the Parliament of Scotland for Nairnshire
- Hugh Campbell, 3rd Earl of Loudoun (1675–1731), Scottish landowner, peer, and statesman
- Hugh Campbell (baseball) (1846–1881), Irish-American baseball player
- Hugh Hume-Campbell, 3rd Earl of Marchmont (1708–1794), Scottish politician
- Hugh Campbell (Australian politician) (c. 1854–1921), Australian politician
- Hugh Campbell (New Zealand politician) (1875–1951), New Zealand politician
- Hugh Lester Campbell (1908–1987), Canadian air marshal and politician
- Hugh Campbell, 4th Earl Cawdor (1870–1914), Scottish nobleman
- Hugh John Vaughan Campbell, 6th Earl Cawdor (1932–1993), Scottish peer and landowner
- Bonny Campbell (Hugh Campbell, 1898–1987), Australian footballer
- Hugh Campbell (rugby union), Scottish rugby coach
- Hugh M. Campbell (1914–2002), Australian philatelist
- Hugh Campbell (footballer) (1911–?), Scottish footballer
- Hugh Hamilton Campbell, architect in Warwick, Queensland, Australia
- Hugh Brown Campbell Jr. (1937–2015), American judge and politician in North Carolina
- Hugh E. Campbell, politician from Arizona
- Hughie Campbell, the main protagonist of the comic book series The Boys
