= Polycarpou =

Polycarpou is a surname. Notable people with the surname include:

- Andy Polycarpou (born 1958), English footballer
- Eve Polycarpou, British actress and comedienne, member of Martha and Eve
- Peter Polycarpou (born 1957), English-Cypriot actor
