= John William Logan =

John William Logan may refer to:

- John Logan (footballer, born 1912) (John William Logan, 1912–1980), English footballer
- Paddy Logan (politician) (John William Logan, 1845–1925), British politician

== See also ==
- William John Logan (1891–1977), American football player
