= Bryn Davies =

Bryn Davies may refer to:

- Bryn Davies, Baron Davies of Brixton, British trade unionist, actuary and politician
- Bryn Davies (footballer), Welsh footballer
- Bryn Davies (musician), American bassist, cellist, and pianist
