= Ernest Lewis =

Ernest Lewis may refer to:

- Ernest Lewis (tennis) (1867–1930), British amateur lawn tennis player
- Ernest Lewis (footballer), Welsh footballer
- Ernest Gordon Lewis (1918–2006), New Zealand-born British colonial administrator and diplomat
- Ernest W. Lewis (1875–1919), American jurist
- Ernie Lewis (1924–1995), American football fullback
