= Gordon Reed =

English footballer, crooner and bandleader

Personal information
- Full name: Gordon Isbister Reed
- Date of birth: 6 May 1913
- Place of birth: Spennymoor, England
- Date of death: 1978 (aged 64)
- Place of death: Wisbech, England
- Height: 5 ft 10 in (1.78 m)
- Position: Centre forward

Senior career*
Years	Team	Apps	(Gls)
- Medomsley Edge
- Consett Technical Institute
1929–1930	Consett		
1930	Huddersfield Town	0	(0)
1930–1931	Spen Black and White		
1931	Spennymoor United		
1931–1932	Everton	0	(0)
1932–1934	Bristol City	12	(4)
1933–1934	Newport County	16	(11)
1934–1935	Queens Park Rangers	9	(4)
1935–1936	Darlington	18	(7)
1936–1937	Gateshead	23	(2)
- * Club domestic league appearances and goals

Gordon Isbister Reed (6 May 1913 – 1978) was an English footballer who played as a centre forward in the Football League for Bristol City, Newport County, Queens Park Rangers, Darlington and Gateshead. He was on the books of Huddersfield Town and Everton without appearing for the first-team of either, and also played non-league football for Medomsley Edge, Consett Technical Institute, Consett, Spen Black and White and Spennymoor United. Reed retired from football in his mid-twenties to take up a musical career, initially as guitarist, singer and bandleader, and later in the music publishing industry.

== Life and career ==
Reed was born in Spennymoor, County Durham, in May 1913. He played football for Medomsley Edge, Consett Technical Institute and Consett, from where he attracted the attention of Football League First Division club Huddersfield Town. He spent time on their books in 1930 before returning to County Durham, where he played as a centre forward and "prolific goal scorer" for Spen Black and White and moved on to Spennymoor United in May 1931. He was watched more than once by Everton, who eventually authorised a director to watch him again on "Wed. next, with powers to sign him on up to a fee of £250." On Wednesday next, 23 September 1931, he scored a hat-trick against Darlington's reserve team in the North-Eastern League. The transfer took place at a fee of £250, reported as a Spennymoor club record, Reed received a signing-on bonus of £5 and wages of £4 10s a week, and he went straight into Everton's reserve team for their next match. He played and scored regularly for the reserves, with 18 goals from 16 games in the Central League, but was given a free transfer at the end of the season.

He moved on to Bristol City – a Second Division club, but one whose relegation was already confirmed – in time to make his Football League debut in the last home match of that season, against Manchester United on 28 April 1932. He played only rarely for Bristol City's first team. In mid-November 1933, with the club thirteen matches into the season and still without a win, Reed came into the side for the visit to Cardiff City in place of the captain, Ted Bowen, who was rested. He scored twice, "proved an inspiring leader, and the whole team rose to the occasion in such brilliant style that the Ashton Gate men won in a common canter." He kept his place as Bristol City won their next four matches and drew the fifth, but Bowen returned to the side thereafter. Reed was unable to force himself back into the team ahead of either Bowen or Joe Riley, and he moved on to another Third Division South club, Newport County, in February 1934. He scored eleven goals in what remained of the campaign, and then signed for Queens Park Rangers, also of the Southern Section. After four goals in the first five matches of the season, Reed lost his place through injury. He came back in for four appearances without scoring in October and November, but those were his last for the club's first team.

Reed returned to the north-east of England and signed for Darlington of the Third Division North. He was a regular at centre forward during the first half of the 1935–36 season, but lost his place to John Logan, up till then a wing half, at the turn of the year. Although the experiment failed, Reed appeared only infrequently thereafter, but his scoring rate improved – four goals from his last six appearances, as against three from his first twelve. He was given a free transfer, and moved on to another Northern Section club, Gateshead.

While pursuing his football career in the winter, Reed spent his summers playing guitar and crooning at an increasingly professional level. In 1936 and 1937, he worked with Alan Green's Band, and in March 1938 – after 23 League appearances for Gateshead that produced just two goals – he decided to quit football and concentrate on a musical career. He signed what the Daily Mirror described as a long contract to front Oscar Rabin's Romany Band at the Hammersmith Palais. By February 1940, he was leading his own band playing at the Ritz Hotel. After the war, he worked in music publishing, for companies including Chappell, Boosey & Hawkes, and Syd Dale's Amphonic.

Reed died in early 1978 in the Wisbech area of Cambridgeshire at the age of 64. He was buried in Blackhill Cemetery, in Consett, County Durham.
