= Jim Henderson (footballer) =

Scottish footballer

Personal information
- Full name: William James Henderson
- Place of birth: Kilbirnie, Scotland
- Position: Forward

Youth career
- Penicuik Athletic

Senior career*
Years	Team	Apps	(Gls)
1932–1934	Cardiff City	43	(25)
- * Club domestic league appearances and goals

William James Henderson is a Scottish former professional footballer. After playing for local amateur side Penicuik Athletic, Henderson attended a trial with Newcastle United. Although unsuccessful, he was instead recommended to Third Division South side Cardiff City by Jimmy Nelson, a Newcastle player who had previously been with Cardiff. He scored on his debut during a 2–1 victory over Aldershot on 4 February 1933. Despite the club's struggles, Henderson finished the season with twelve league goals from sixteen matches, including five during a 6–0 victory over Northampton Town. He remained with the Bluebirds the following season but, despite finishing the season as the club's joint top goalscorer with Eli Postin, he was one of a number of players released by manager Ben Watts-Jones after the club finished bottom of the Football League.
