= Eddie Jenkins (footballer, born 1909) =

Welsh footballer

Personal information
- Full name: Edwin Jonathan Jenkins
- Date of birth: 16 July 1909
- Place of birth: Cardiff, Wales
- Date of death: 5 August 2005 (aged 96)
- Place of death: Cardiff, Wales
- Position: Wing half

Senior career*
Years	Team	Apps	(Gls)
1930–1934	Cardiff City	77	(0)
1934–1935	Bristol City		
1935–????	Newport County		
- * Club domestic league appearances and goals

Edwin Jonathan Jenkins (16 July 1909 – 5 August 2005) was a Welsh professional footballer. He began his professional career with Cardiff City, making his debut for the club in February 1930. After two seasons as a reserve, he featured regularly for the club in the Third Division South between 1932 and 1934, making 87 appearances in all competitions before being released. He later played for Bristol City and Newport County before retiring.

== Early life ==
Jenkins was born in Cardiff, where his father worked as a blacksmith in a local steelworks before setting up his own milk business. Jenkins attended Howard Gardens School but left school at the age of 14 to work for his father.

== Career ==
Jenkins worked as a milkman while playing local amateur football for Splott Labour Amateurs and Cardiff East when he was spotted by coaches at Cardiff City. He was invited to a trial and joined the club in 1930, making his professional debut on 4 February 1930 in a 2–1 defeat to Bradford City in the Second Division. He made seven further league appearances for the club at the end of the 1930–31 season in place of club captain Fred Keenor, who would leave the club soon after to join Crewe Alexandra, as Cardiff suffered relegation to the Third Division South. After a second season as a reserve player, serving as backup to the more experienced Jack Galbraith and making just five appearances, he eventually established himself in the first team at the start of the 1932–33 season after displacing William Roberts.

The club struggled in the Third Division South, finishing 19th in 1933 followed by a bottom-placed finish in 1934, and Jenkins was one of several players released by new manager Ben Watts-Jones in an attempt to reverse the club's fortunes. Following his release, Jenkins was offered a contract with Tottenham Hotspur but rejected the move as he felt "there were better prospects in the milk business." However, Jenkins returned to professional football the following season, joining Bristol City where he spent one season. He later moved to Newport County where he finished his professional career.

== Later life ==
Following the outbreak of World War II, Jenkins served in the Far East and North Africa with the Royal Navy, where he was awarded the Africa Star. On his return to Britain after the war, he joined his father's milk company and became a Freemason. He also became a qualified referee. He later wrote a book on Splott in Cardiff, the area of the city that he grew up, entitled The Splott I Remember. He died on 5 August 2005 at the age of 96 in Cardiff. At the time of his death, he was the oldest surviving former Cardiff City player.
