= Tom Doncaster =

English footballer

Personal information
- Full name: Thomas Doncaster
- Date of birth: 1888
- Positions: Left back; left half

Senior career*
Years	Team	Apps	(Gls)
1912	Barnsley	4	(0)
1912–1915	Cardiff City	60	(1)
- * Club domestic league appearances and goals

Tom Doncaster was an English professional footballer who played for Barnsley and Cardiff City.

== Honours ==
Cardiff City

- Southern Football League Second Division winner: 1912–13
