= Charlie Bisby =

English footballer

Personal information
- Full name: Clarence Charles Bisby
- Date of birth: 10 September 1904
- Place of birth: Mexborough, England
- Date of death: 1977 (aged 72–73)
- Position: Full back

Senior career*
Years	Team	Apps	(Gls)
1925	Denaby United		
1926–1932	Notts County	206	(1)
1932–1935	Coventry City	100	(0)
1935–1936	Mansfield Town	9	(0)
1936	Peterborough United		
Total		315	(1)
- * Club domestic league appearances and goals

Clarence Charles Bisby (10 September 1904 – 1977) was an English professional footballer who played in the Football League for Coventry City, Mansfield Town and Notts County.
