= Ian MacLean =

Scottish footballer

Ian McLean
Personal information
- Full name: Ian McLean
- Date of birth: August 13, 1966 (age 60)
- Place of birth: Paisley, Scotland
- Height: 6 ft 2 in (1.88 m)
- Position: Defender

Senior career*
Years	Team	Apps	(Gls)
1989	Seattle Storm	1	(1)
1990	Portland Timbers		
1992–1993	Metro Ford		
1993–1996	Bristol Rovers	35	(2)
1994	→ Cardiff City (loan)	3	(0)
1994	→ Cardiff City (loan)	1	(0)
1995–1996	→ Rotherham United (loan)	9	(0)
	Total	49	(3)

International career^{‡}
1995	Canada	3	(0)
- * Club domestic league appearances and goals as of 11 November 2009 ‡ National team caps and goals as of 11 November 2009

Ian McLean (born August 13, 1966, in Paisley, Scotland) is a former footballer.

== Club career ==
McLean played for Seattle Storm, Portland Timbers, Bristol Rovers, Cardiff City and Rotherham United.

== International career ==
Although born in Scotland, McLean has represented Canada three times. His international debut was against Portugal in a SkyDome Cup match in Toronto on January 26, 1995, in a 1–1 draw, playing for 45 minutes. On June 4, 1995, he played for 30 minutes in a friendly which Turkey won 3–1. On August 3, 1995, McLean made his third and final appearance for the national side in a 3–1 win over Trinidad and Tobago in a Caribana Cup match, also in Toronto.
