= Jerry Murphy (footballer, born 1907) =

Welsh footballer

Personal information
- Full name: Jeremiah Murphy
- Date of birth: 16 March 1907
- Place of birth: Dowlais, Wales
- Date of death: December 20, 1981
- Position: Inside forward

Senior career*
Years	Team	Apps	(Gls)
1925–1927	Merthyr Town	18	(4)
1927–1929	Cardiff City	1	(0)
1929–1931	Fulham	13	(2)
1931–1932	Crystal Palace	8	(2)
- Merthyr Town
- Troedyrhiw
- Dolphin
1934–1936	Barry	25	(2)
- * Club domestic league appearances and goals

Jeremiah Murphy (16 March 1907 – 1992) was a Welsh professional footballer who played as an inside forward. He played in the Football League for Merthyr Town, Cardiff City, Fulham and Crystal Palace.

As a schoolboy Jerry Murphy won the Welsh Schoolboys Challenge Shield on 28 May 1923 with Merthyr Schoolboys. They beat Aberdare Schoolboys 3-0 after a 1-1 draw. Murphy attended Dowlais RC School.

The blue cap is for his two Wales Schoolboys matches. On 21 April 1923 Wales lost 7-2 to England Schoolboys at Filbert Street, Leicester. Murphy scored both Wales goals. In his second match against Scotland on 12 May 1923 Wales won 4-1.

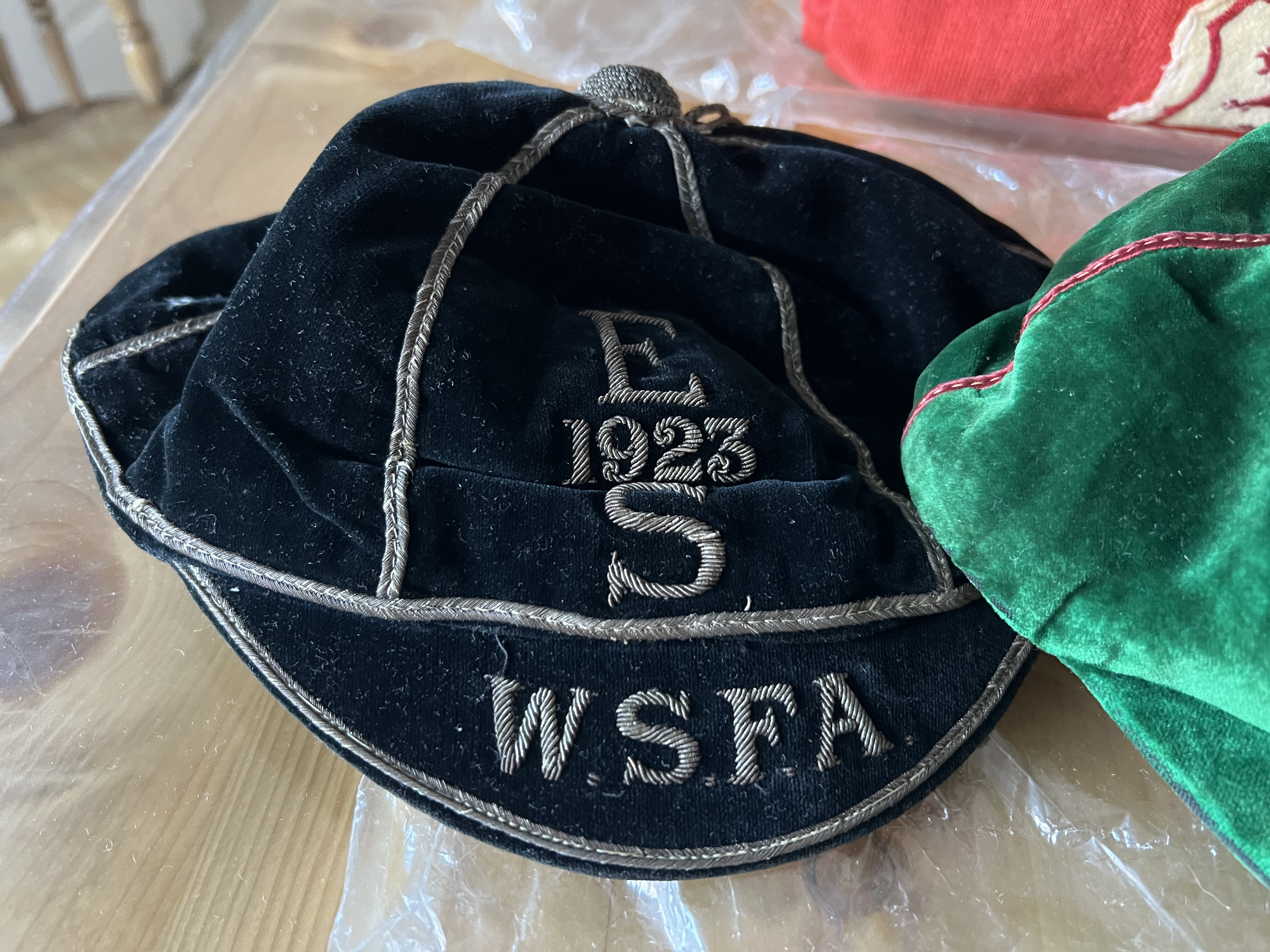
1923 Wales Schoolboy International Football Cap

The two green caps were awarded by the FAW for junior internationals. The first (1927-28) was for Wales v Ireland at Farrar Road, Bangor. It was a 2-2 draw with both Wales goals from Murphy. The second cap (1928-29) is for Wales v Ireland at Celtic Park, Belfast on 3 April 1929 which ended 3-0 for Ireland.

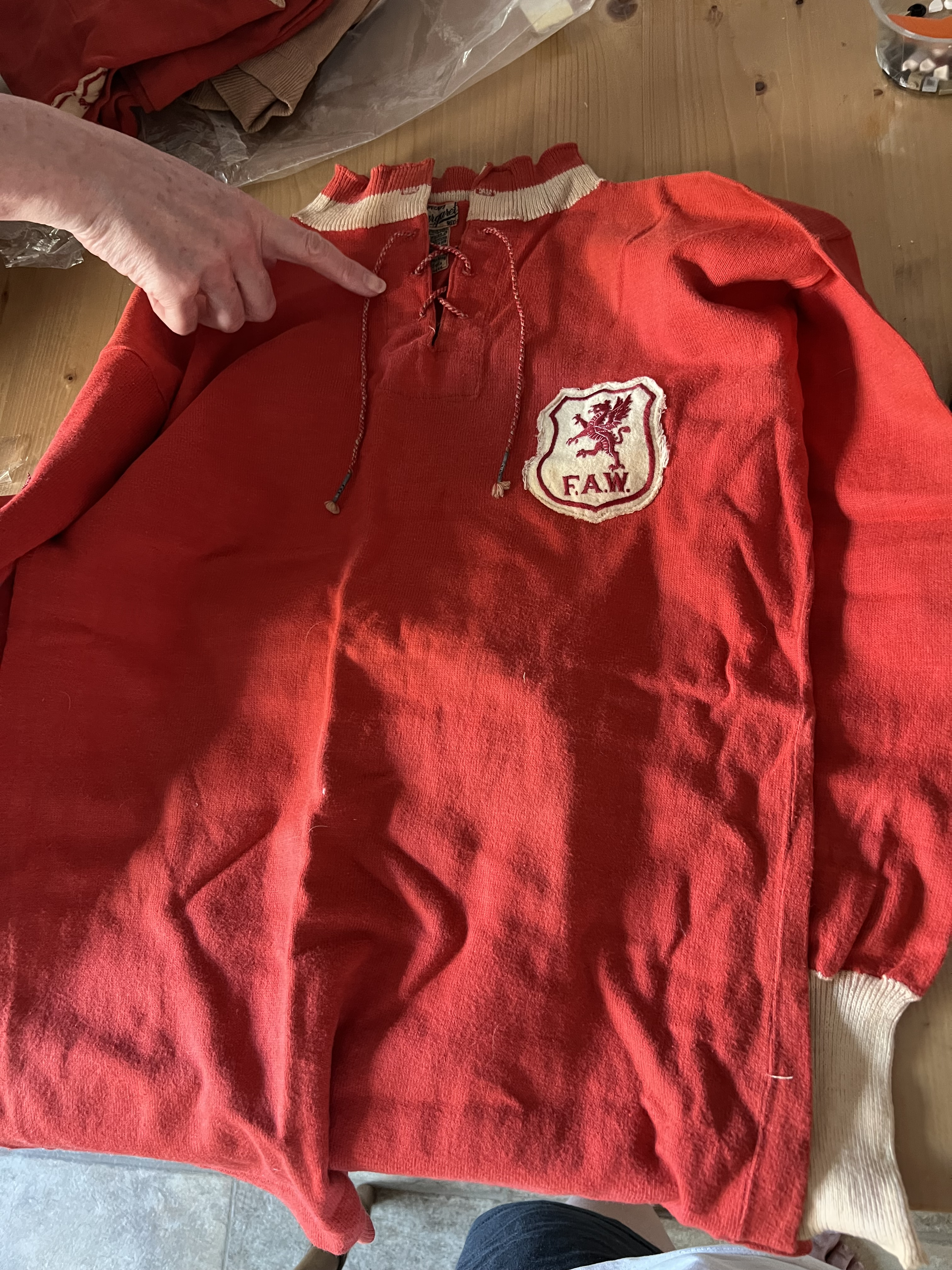
1920s Wales Junior Football Shirt

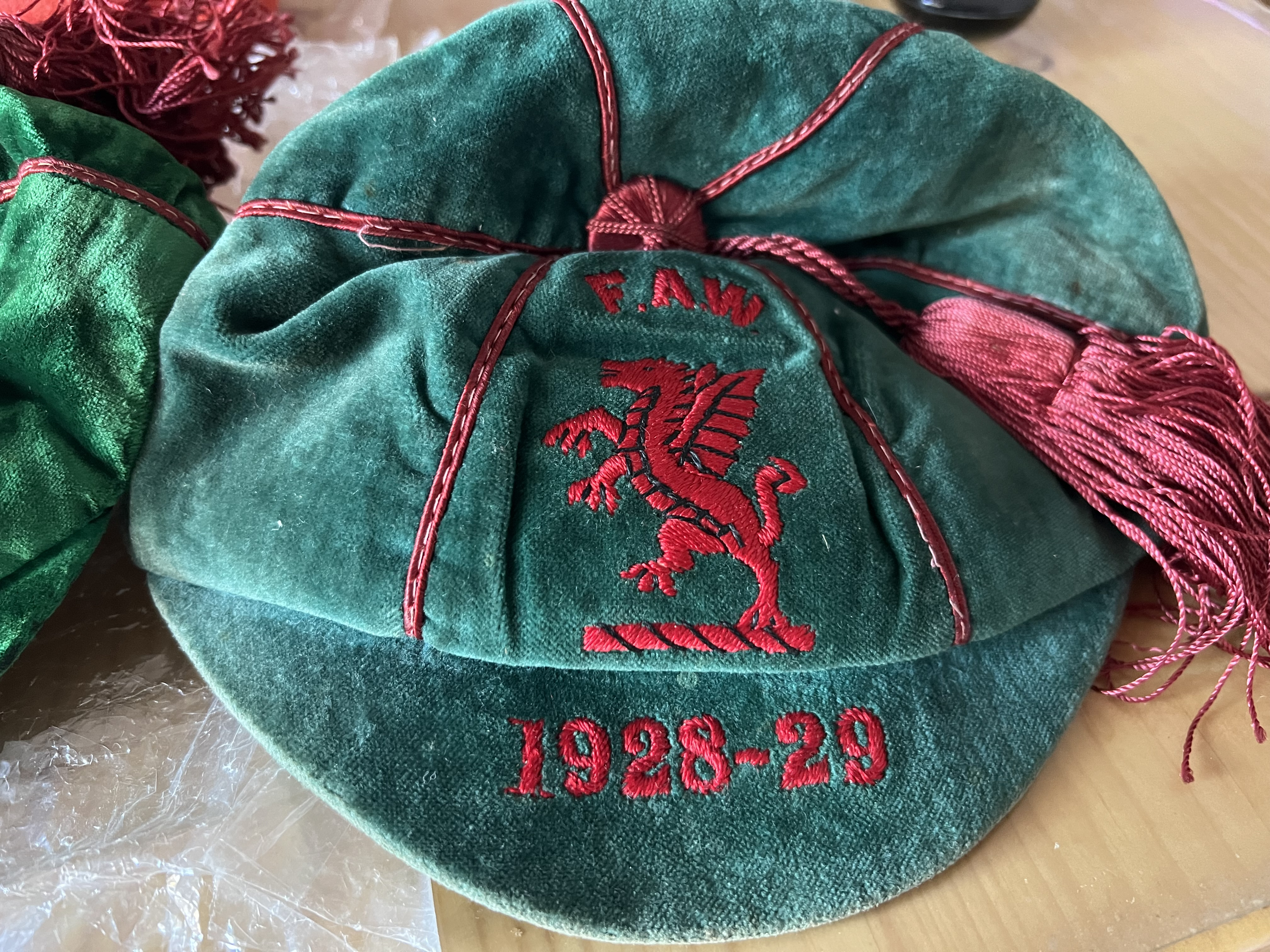
1928-29 Junior Wales Football Cap

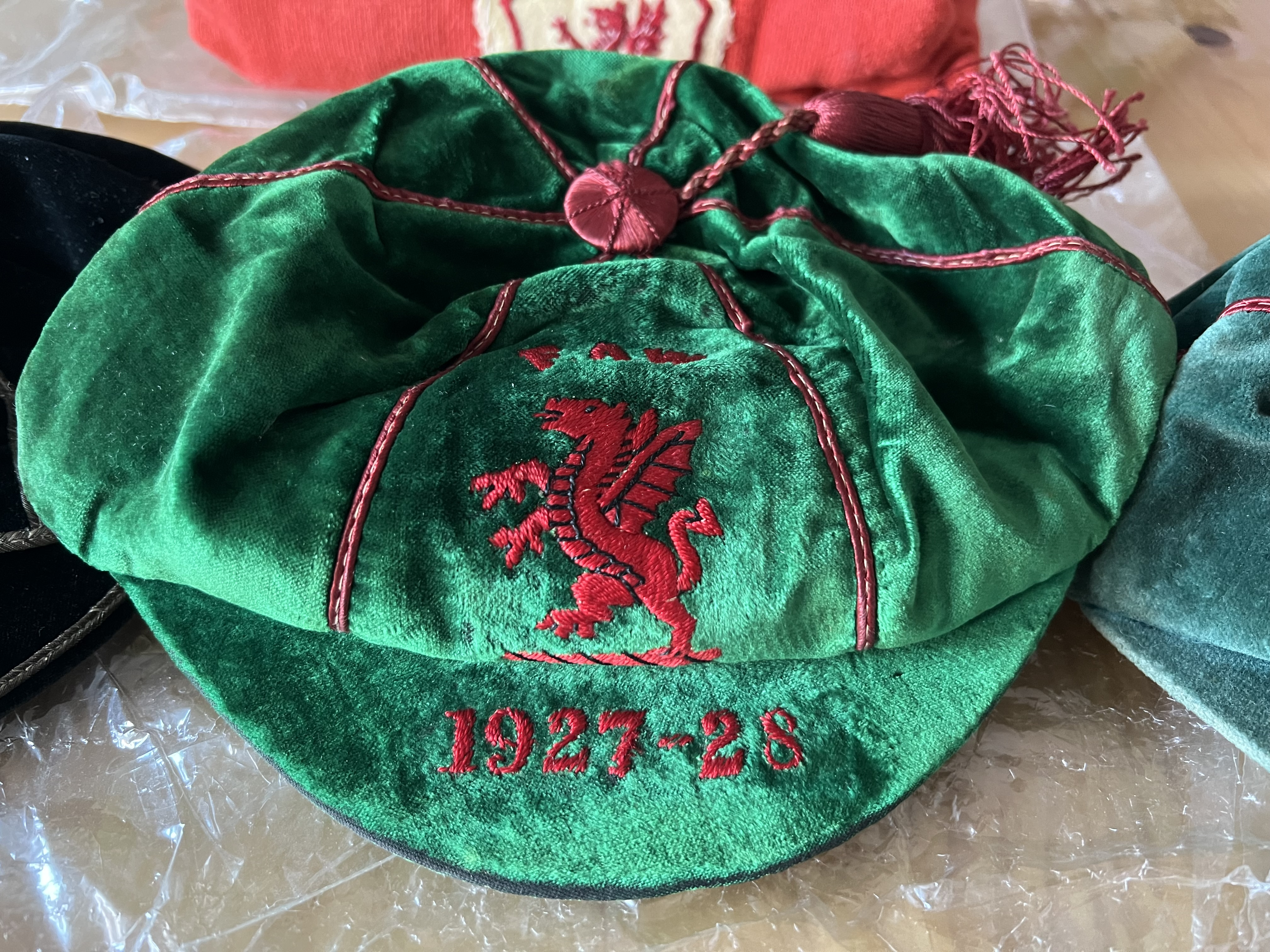
1927-28 Junior Wales Football Cap
