= Hugh M. Campbell =

Australian philatelist

Hugh Maitland Campbell (1914 – 10 July 2002) was an Australian philatelist who was added to the Roll of Distinguished Philatelists in 1969.

Campbell was a specialist in the stamps and postal history of the Australian states.
