= Leslie Adlam =

English footballer

Personal information
- Full name: Leslie William Adlam
- Date of birth: 24 June 1897
- Place of birth: Guildford, England
- Date of death: 1975 (aged 77–78)
- Height: 5 ft 10 1/2 in (1.79 m)
- Position: Right half

Senior career*
Years	Team	Apps	(Gls)
- Farnham United Breweries
1922–1923	Guildford United	25	(17)
1923–1931	Oldham Athletic	279	(9)
1931–1932	Queens Park Rangers	56	(0)
1933–1934	Cardiff City	4	(0)
- Guildford Post Office
- * Club domestic league appearances and goals

Leslie William Adlam (24 June 1897 – 1975) was an English professional footballer who played in the Football League for Cardiff City, Oldham Athletic and Queens Park Rangers. He began his career with non-League side Guildford United as a centre-forward before converting to a wing-half with Oldham where played more than 250 times.

== Club career ==
Adlam was playing for non-league side Guildford United, Adlam as a centre-forward when he attracted the attention of Oldham Athletic who signed him for a club record fee of £300 in March 1923, beating off competition from Bristol Rovers. He soon converted to a right-hand and in eight seasons with Oldham, he made over 250 appearances in all competitions. He was granted a benefit match in April 1930 against Bristol City, guaranteeing him at least £500 from the fixture. He left the club in 1931, spending two years with Queens Park Rangers where he captained the side. He left Rangers in 1933 after failing to agree a new deal. He joined Third Division South side Cardiff City in December 1933. After sitting out the club's first match due to his fitness levels, he made his debut in a 3–1 defeat to Northampton Town on 23 December in place of John Duthie. He remained in the side for the three following matches, back-to-back games against Coventry City and a victory over Watford. However, the club's directors decided to release Adlam in the first week of January 1934.

== Personal life ==
Born in Guildford, Adlam's father Robert worked as a railway guard. Before turning professional as a footballer, Adlam worked as a railway clerk. He married May Baines, a shop assistant, on 19 February 1924 in Glodwick, Lancashire.
