= Gerry King =

Welsh footballer

Personal information
- Full name: Gerald Henry King
- Date of birth: 7 April 1947 (age 79)
- Place of birth: Radnor, Wales
- Position: Winger

Senior career*
| Years | Team | Apps | (Gls) |
| 1964–1965 | Cardiff City | 6 | (0) |
| 1965–1966 | Torquay United | 18 | (2) |
| 1966–1967 | Luton Town | 22 | (4) |
| 1967–1969 | Newport County | 52 | (9) |
- * Club domestic league appearances and goals

Gerald Henry King (born 7 April 1947) is a Welsh former professional footballer who played as a winger. He made 98 appearances in the Football League during spells with Cardiff City, Torquay United, Luton Town and Newport County.

== Career ==
Having represented Wales at schoolboy level, King made his professional debut for Cardiff City during the 1964–65 season. After making six league appearances, he lost his place in the side to Bernie Lewis and was allowed to leave for Torquay United. He later played for Luton Town and Newport County.
