= Frank Peters (footballer) =

English footballer

Personal information
- Full name: Frank Reginald Peters
- Date of birth: 26 February 1910
- Place of birth: Birmingham, England
- Date of death: 1990 (aged 79-80)
- Height: 5 ft 8 in (1.73 m)
- Position: Outside right

Youth career
- Old Mills

Senior career*
Years	Team	Apps	(Gls)
19??–1928	Coventry City	0	(0)
- Wellington St George's
1930–1931	Charlton Athletic	29	(7)
1931–1932	Fulham	1	(1)
1933–1936	Swindon Town	100	(45)
1936–1939	Bristol City	113	(22)
Total		243	(75)
- * Club domestic league appearances and goals

Frank Reginald Peters (26 February 1910 – 1990) was an English footballer who played as an outside right. He was born in Birmingham. He made over 240 Football League appearances in the years before the Second World War.

== Career ==
Peters played locally for Wellington St George's. He initially joined Coventry City but failed to make a first team appearance. Peters moved to Charlton Athletic in July 1930. He had a short spell with Fulham. Peters joined Swindon Town in July 1933. Bob Hewison signed Peters in May 1936 from Swindon Town for Bristol City. Like so many other players Peters ended his football career on the outbreak of the Second World War.

== Honours ==
with Bristol City

- Football League Third Division South runners up: 1937–38
