= Bob Calder =

Scottish footballer

Personal information
- Full name: Robert Calder
- Date of birth: 2 January 1907
- Place of birth: Glasgow, Scotland
- Date of death: 1973
- Place of death: Daventry, England
- Height: 5 ft 10 1/2 in (1.79 m)
- Position: Defender

Senior career*
Years	Team	Apps	(Gls)
- Bell Telephone
- Montréal Carsteel FC
1932–1933	Rangers	0	(0)
1933–1934	Cardiff City	37	(0)
1934–1935	Bradford City		
1935–1936	Newport County		
1936–?	Barrow		
- * Club domestic league appearances and goals

Robert Calder (born 2 January 1907) was a Scottish professional footballer.

Calder played in Canada during the early stages of his career for Bell Telephone, Toronto Scottish, and Montréal Carsteel FC in the Canadian National Soccer League and played for a Toronto All-Stars side in 2 matches against a Scottish FA XI in 1927. He returned to his native Scotland in 1933 to join Rangers, making one appearance in a 3–1 victory over Queen's Park in the Scottish Cup. Calder joined Football League Third Division South side Cardiff City at the start of the 1933–34 season and established himself in the first-team, playing 37 times in the league for the club, but the club finished bottom of the Football League and Calder was one of a number of players released at the end of the season by manager Ben Watts-Jones. He later played for Bradford City, Newport County and Barrow.
