= Jack Galbraith =

Scottish footballer

Personal information
- Full name: John McDonald Galbraith
- Date of birth: 4 April 1898
- Place of birth: Renton, Scotland
- Height: 5 ft 10 in (1.78 m)
- Position: Full back

Youth career
- –: Vale of Leven
- –: Shawfield

Senior career*
Years	Team	Apps	(Gls)
1921–1931	Clapton Orient	277	(9)
1931–1935	Cardiff City	143	(2)

Managerial career
- 1936–1938: Lens
- 1939: Lens
- * Club domestic league appearances and goals

John McDonald Galbraith (4 April 1898 – ?) was a Scottish professional footballer. He was born in Renton, West Dunbartonshire.

Galbraith began his career playing junior football at Vale of Leven and Shawfield before signing for Clapton Orient in 1921. He went on to spend a decade at the club, making 277 league appearances, before joining Cardiff City in February 1931. He was signed as a replacement for the club's FA Cup-winning captain Fred Keenor, but was unable to stop the club's slide as they fell into the Third Division South. He left the club in 1935 to manage Milford United, before later returning to Clapton Orient as a coach. Between 1936 and 1938, and for a short spell in 1939, Galbraith managed French side RC Lens.

== Honours ==
RC Lens

- Ligue 2: 1936–37
