= Alexander Hutchinson (footballer) =

Scottish footballer

Personal information
- Full name: Alexander Hutchinson
- Date of birth: 4 October 1908
- Place of birth: Musselburgh, Scotland
- Position: Outside left

Youth career
- Portobello Thistle

Senior career*
| Years | Team | Apps | (Gls) |
| 1928–1929 | Bo'ness | 45 | (19) |
| 1929–1930 | Burnley | 5 | (2) |
| 1930–1931 | Blackpool | 6 | (2) |
| 1931–1932 | Bo'ness | 11 | (2) |
| 1932 | Leith Athletic | 5 | (2) |
| 1932 | Hibernian | 3 | (3) |
| 1932–1933 | King's Park | 15 | (3) |
| 1933–1934 | Cardiff City | 23 | (4) |
- * Club domestic league appearances and goals

Alexander Hutchinson (born 4 October 1908, date of death unknown) was a Scottish professional footballer who played as an outside left (winger).

After starting his career in Scotland with Bo'ness, Hutchinson moved to England to join Burnley in October 1929. After five league games and two goals, he joined the Clarets' Lancashire neighbours Blackpool the following season, 1930–31. He made his debut for the Tangerines on 1 November 1930, in a 3–0 defeat at Chelsea. He appeared in the following five league games, scoring twice. His first goal came in a 2–2 draw against Aston Villa at Bloomfield Road on 22 November; the second a fortnight later, a 3–1 reversal at West Ham on 6 December.

Blackpool did not retain his services at the end of the campaign, at which point he left and returned to Bo'ness, then had short spells with Leith Athletic, Hibernian and King's Park.

He finished his career with Cardiff City in 1934, making 23 league appearances and scoring four goals for the Bluebirds.
