= Enoch Mort =

Welsh footballer

Personal information
- Full name: Enoch Francis Mort
- Date of birth: 5 March 1912
- Place of birth: Ogmore Vale, Wales
- Date of death: 1999 (aged 86–87)
- Height: 5 ft 10 1/2 in (1.79 m)
- Position: Defender

Senior career*
Years	Team	Apps	(Gls)
1934–1938	Cardiff City	43	(0)
1938–1939	Carlisle United	17	(0)
- * Club domestic league appearances and goals

Enoch Francis Mort (5 March 1912 – 1999) was a Welsh professional footballer who played in the Football League as a centre-half for Cardiff City and Carlisle United.

== Career ==
Born in Ogmore Vale, Mort played amateur football for Gilfach Goch before joining Cardiff City in February 1934. He made his first-team debut on 3 March 1934 in a 3–1 victory over Queens Park Rangers and remained in the side for the final twelve matches of the season. However, at the end of the season, Cardiff signed Billy Bassett who became first choice. Mort remained with Cardiff until 1938, making sporadic appearances, before joining Carlisle United.

He was a cousin of Aston Villa defender Tommy Mort.
