= George Russell (footballer, born 1902) =

English footballer

Personal information
- Full name: George Henry Russell
- Date of birth: 11 August 1902
- Place of birth: Atherstone, England
- Position: Full back

Senior career*
Years	Team	Apps	(Gls)
1925–1926	Portsmouth	0	(0)
1926–1927	Watford		
1927–1930	Northampton Town		
1930–1932	Bristol Rovers		
1932–1933	Cardiff City	56	(1)
1933–1934	Sheffield United		
1934–1935	Newport County		
1935–????	Stafford Rangers		
- Bangor City
- * Club domestic league appearances and goals

George Henry Russell (11 August 1902 — after 1935) was an English professional footballer who played as a full back.
