= Peter Molloy (footballer, born 1909) =

English footballer and manager

Personal information
- Date of birth: 20 April 1909
- Place of birth: Rossendale, England
- Date of death: 16 February 1993 (aged 83)
- Place of death: St Albans, England
- Height: 5 ft 9 in (1.75 m)
- Position: Wing half

Senior career*
Years	Team	Apps	(Gls)
1930–1931	Accrington Stanley	0	(0)
1931–1933	Fulham	4	(0)
1933–1934	Bristol Rovers	6	(0)
1934–1935	Cardiff City	23	(0)
1935–1936	Queens Park Rangers	3	(0)
1936–1937	Stockport County	10	(0)
1937–1938	Carlisle United	33	(0)
1938–1939	Bradford City	25	(0)
1943	Watford (war guest)	1	(0)
Total		105	(0)

Managerial career
- 1947–1949: Galatasaray
- 1948–1949: Turkey
- 1949–1951: Fenerbahçe
- 1950: Turkey
- * Club domestic league appearances and goals

Peter Molloy, also known as Pat Molloy (20 April 1909 – 16 February 1993) was an English professional football player, manager and referee.

== Club career ==
Born in Rossendale, Molloy played as a wing half in the Football League for Bristol Rovers during the 1933–34 season, making six appearances.

He also played for Fulham, Cardiff City, Queens Park Rangers, Stockport County, Carlisle United and Bradford City.

Molloy also made one guest appearance as a player for Watford during a wartime game against Aldershot on 2 January 1943.

== Coaching and management ==
Molloy managed Turkish club side Galatasaray between 1947 and 1949. He later managed the Turkey national team in two spells, before moving onto Fenerbahçe. He returned to England in 1951, working as a trainer at Watford between 1951 and 1976. During this time, he had a benefit match against rivals Luton in 1968 and a testimonial against Wolves in 1973.

== Refereeing ==
Molloy was also a noted referee in Turkey.

== Personal life ==
Molloy served in the British Army during the Second World War.
