= Harry Perks =

Welsh footballer

Personal information
- Full name: Henry Perks
- Date of birth: 1912
- Place of birth: Cardiff, Wales
- Position: Outside forward

Senior career*
Years	Team	Apps	(Gls)
1933–1934	Cardiff City	9	(1)
1934–1935	Newport County		
1935–1936	Barry	13	(9)
1936–?	Milford United		
- * Club domestic league appearances and goals

Henry Perks (1912 – after 1936) was a Welsh professional footballer who played as an outside forward. He played in the Football League for Cardiff City and Newport County and later played for non-league sides Barry and Milford United.
