= Joe West (footballer) =

English footballer (1910–1965)

Personal information
- Full name: Joseph West
- Date of birth: 1910
- Place of birth: Walker, England
- Date of death: 1965 (aged 55)
- Place of death: Newcastle upon Tyne, England
- Height: 5 ft 8 1/2 in (1.74 m)
- Position: Forward

Senior career*
Years	Team	Apps	(Gls)
19??–1932	Walker Park		
1932–1933	Newcastle United	0	(0)
1933–1934	Cardiff City	6	(2)
1934	Walker Celtic	1	(4)
1934–1935	Darlington	2	(1)
1935–1936	Walker Celtic		
1936–1937	Ashford		
1937–1938	Jarrow		
1938	Walker Celtic		
1938–1939	South Shields		
1939	Alnwick Town		
- * Club domestic league appearances and goals

Joseph West (1910–1965) was an English footballer who played as a forward in the Football League for Cardiff City and Darlington.

== Life and career ==
West was born in 1910 in Walker, Northumberland, the sixth child of Joseph West, a colliery deputy, and his wife Alice. (Note: Westgarth's birth was registered in the first quarter of 1910 in the Tynemouth registration district of Northumberland, which includes Walker, and the 1911 UK Census gives his birthplace and that of his siblings specifically as Walker.)

He played football as a centre forward for Walker Park, from where he signed for Newcastle United in May 1932 after scoring all five Newcastle goals in a trial appearance in a friendly match. He spent 18 months with the club, never appeared for the first team, and, described as a speedy inside forward, moved on to Cardiff City in November 1933. He made six appearances in the Third Division South and scored twice, in a 3–1 defeat to Luton Town in December and a 4–2 victory over Bournemouth in January 1934, and was released on a free transfer at the end of the season.

West joined North Eastern League club Walker Celtic, scored four goals against North Shields on his debut, and two days later moved back into the Football League with Darlington. In January 1935, he scored 10 goals for Darlington Reserves as they beat West Stanley 12–2 in the North Eastern League, and was the top scorer for the reserve side, but could not dislodge the prolific Jerry Best from the first team. He played only twice in the Third Division North, when Best was unavailable, and scored once: Darlington's fourth goal in a 4–1 defeat of Lincoln City in March. By November, he was back with Walker Celtic who became the 1935–36 North Eastern League runners-up.

For the 1936–1937 season West moved southwards and played for Ashford of the Kent League. In April 1937 he scored seven goals in Ashford's record 15–0 league victory over Erith & Belvedere.

Thereafter West returned to North Eastern League football: he began the 1937-1938 season with Jarrow; in February 1938 he returned to Walker Celtic; in August 1938 he signed on for South Shields but was unable to command a first team place; and in April 1939 was with Northern Football Alliance club Alnwick Town.

West died in Newcastle upon Tyne in 1965 at the age of 55. (Note: West's death at the age of 55 was registered in the third quarter of 1965 in the Newcastle upon Tyne registration district.)
