= Andy Polycarpou =

English footballer

Personal information
- Full name: Andrew Polycarpou
- Date of birth: 12 August 1958 (age 68)
- Place of birth: Islington, England
- Position: Midfielder

Senior career*
| Years | Team | Apps | (Gls) |
| 1976–1981 | Southend United | 61 | (10) |
| 1981–1982 | Cambridge United | 5 | (0) |
| 1982 | Cardiff City | 7 | (0) |
- * Club domestic league appearances and goals

Andrew Polycarpou (born 15 August 1958) is an English former professional footballer who played as a midfielder. He began his career with Southend United, making over 60 appearances in all competitions and winning promotion on two occasions with the club. He joined Cambridge United in 1981 but persistent injury problems led to him moving to Cardiff City in April 1982. He made seven appearances as the club suffered relegation and he was released at the end of the season.
