= Harold Friend =

Welsh footballer

Personal information
- Date of birth: 1909
- Place of birth: Cardiff, Wales
- Position: Wing half

Senior career*
Years	Team	Apps	(Gls)
1933–1934	Cardiff City	3	(0)
- * Club domestic league appearances and goals

Harold Friend (1909 – after 1934) was a Welsh professional footballer who played as a wing half. He made three appearances in the Football League for Cardiff City.
