= Bill Marshalsey =

Scottish footballer

Personal information
- Full name: William Henry Gray Marshalsey
- Date of birth: 18 April 1910
- Place of birth: Fife, Scotland
- Date of death: 1977 (aged 66–67)
- Position: Wing half

Youth career
- Denbeath Star

Senior career*
Years	Team	Apps	(Gls)
- St Bernard's
1930–1933	Heart of Midlothian	1	(0)
1933–1934	Cardiff City	7	(1)
- * Club domestic league appearances and goals

William Henry Gray Marshalsey (18 April 1910 – 1977) was a Scottish professional footballer who played as a wing half. He made one appearance for Heart of Midlothian and later played in the Football League for Cardiff City.

== Career ==
After playing junior football for Denbeath Star, Marshalsey joined St Bernard's and was eventually offered a contract with Heart of Midlothian in 1930. He made his professional debut for the club in a 4–2 victory over Falkirk on 18 February 1932. However, he struggled to break into the first team and made no further appearances for the side.

He was placed on the transfer list, with Hearts initially valuing him at £600. However, a lack of interest led the club to reduce their asking price to £300 before eventually allowing him to join Cardiff City on a free transfer in 1933. He made seven league appearances during the 1933–34 season, scoring once against Torquay United, but was one of several players released at the end of the season after the club finished bottom of the Third Division South.
