= Tommy Paget =

Welsh footballer

Personal information
- Full name: William Sidney Thomas Paget
- Date of birth: 4 March 1909
- Place of birth: Cardiff, Wales
- Date of death: 1960 (aged 50–51)
- Place of death: Cardiff, Wales
- Position: Forward

Senior career*
Years	Team	Apps	(Gls)
1932–1934	Cardiff City	6	(0)
1934–1935	Newport County		
1935–1936	Clapton Orient	0	(0)
1936–1938	Barry	63	(24)
- * Club domestic league appearances and goals

William Sidney Thomas Paget (4 March 1909 – 1960) was a Welsh professional footballer who played as a forward. He played in the Football League for Cardiff City and Newport County and later played for non-league side Barry.
