= Hugh Campbell (footballer) =

Scottish footballer

Personal information
- Full name: Hugh Campbell
- Date of birth: 20 January 1911
- Place of birth: Glasgow, Scotland
- Position: Winger

Senior career*
Years	Team	Apps	(Gls)
	Rangers	0	(0)
1935–1936	Clapton Orient		
1936–1937	Cardiff City	1	(0)
1937	Ballymena United		
1937–1939	Halifax Town		
- * Club domestic league appearances and goals

Hugh Campbell (20 January 1911 — after 1939) was a Scottish professional footballer who played as a winger.

== Career ==
Born in Glasgow, Campbell began his career with Rangers but did not make an appearance for the first team. After a spell with Clapton Orient, he joined Cardiff City where he made one appearance in a 2–1 defeat to Bristol City. He later spent time with Ballymena United before finishing his professional career with Halifax Town.
