= Jack Durkan =

Scottish footballer (1915–1990)

Personal information
- Full name: James Durkan
- Date of birth: 14 July 1915
- Place of birth: Bannockburn, Scotland
- Date of death: 1990 (aged 74)
- Place of death: Glasgow, Scotland
- Position: Full back

Senior career*
Years	Team	Apps	(Gls)
- King's Park
1933–1934	Cardiff City	6	(0)
1934–1935	Bristol Rovers		
- * Club domestic league appearances and goals

James Durkan (14 July 1915 – 1990) was a Scottish professional footballer who played as a defender.

== Career ==
Durkan began his career with King's Park in his native Scotland before joining Cardiff City in 1933. He made six league appearances for the club before being released at the end of the season, finishing his professional career with Bristol Rovers.
