= John Logan (footballer, born 1912) =

English footballer

Personal information
- Full name: John William Logan
- Date of birth: 16 August 1912
- Place of birth: Horden, England
- Date of death: 8 October 1980 aged 68
- Place of death: Barnsley, England
- Height: 5 ft 7 1/2 in (1.71 m)
- Position: Wing half

Senior career*
Years	Team	Apps	(Gls)
–	Horden Colliery Welfare		
1934–1935	Charlton Athletic	0	(0)
1935–1937	Darlington	65	(5)
1937–1947	Barnsley	102	(5)
1947	Sheffield Wednesday	4	(0)
- * Club domestic league appearances and goals

John William Logan (16 August 1912 – 8 October 1980) was an English professional footballer born in Horden, near Peterlee, County Durham who played in the Football League for Darlington, Barnsley and Sheffield Wednesday. He played as a wing half.
