= Bryn Davies (footballer) =

Welsh footballer

Personal information
- Full name: Albert Brynley Davies
- Date of birth: 17 December 1913
- Place of birth: Cardiff, Wales
- Date of death: 1990 (aged 72–73)
- Height: 5 ft 8 in (1.73 m)
- Position: Inside forward

Senior career*
Years	Team	Apps	(Gls)
1935–1938	Cardiff City	9	(0)
1938–1939	Ipswich Town		
- * Club domestic league appearances and goals

Albert Brynley Davies (17 December 1913 – 1990) was a Welsh professional footballer who played as an inside forward. He began his career with Cardiff City, where he made his professional debut, before joining Ipswich Town in 1938. However, he sustained injuries in battle during World War II that meant he was unable to play professionally after the war ended.

== Career ==
Born in Cardiff, Davies joined his hometown club Cardiff City after completing his Army service. He initially signed for the club as an amateur before making his professional debut in a 0–0 draw with Newport County on 14 September 1935 in the Third Division South. He was forced to wait until April 1936 before making another appearance, playing in the final five matches of the 1935–36 season.

However, he made only four further appearances over the following two seasons, spending the majority of his time playing in the club's reserve side. He moved to Ipswich Town, newly elected to the Football League, in 1938 and scored in the club's first match in the Third Division South. He remained with the club until the end of the 1938–39 season before his professional career was ended following the outbreak of World War II.

== Later life ==
As a former soldier, Davies was one of the first professional footballers to enlist in the army during World War II. He sustained injuries in battle that meant he was unable to return to professional football at the end of the war.

He later worked as a scout for his former side Cardiff City and Bristol City before working in local government in Cardiff.
