= Bob Adams (footballer) =

English footballer (1917–1970)

Personal information
- Full name: Robert James Adams
- Date of birth: 28 February 1917
- Place of birth: Coleford, Gloucestershire, England
- Date of death: 1 September 1970 (aged 53)
- Place of death: Blakeney, Norfolk, England
- Height: 5 ft 11 in (1.80 m)
- Position: Goalkeeper

Senior career*
| Years | Team | Apps | (Gls) |
| ?-? | Coleford | ? | (?) |
| ?-? | Chepstow | ? | (?) |
| 1932–1934 | Cardiff City | 11 | (0) |
| 1934–1935 | Bristol Rovers | 2 | (0) |
| 1935–1936 | Millwall | 6 | (0) |
| 1936–1937 | Bristol City | 0 | (0) |
- * Club domestic league appearances and goals

Robert James Adams (28 February 1917 – 1 September 1970) was an English professional footballer who played in The Football League for Cardiff City, Bristol Rovers and Millwall.

== Career ==
Born in Coleford, Gloucestershire, Adams joined Cardiff City at the age of 16 in 1932, keeping a clean sheet on his Football League debut soon after in February 1933 during a 2–0 win over Southend United in Division Three South. He spent two years at Ninian Park, largely as cover for Tom Farquharson, making eleven league appearances before leaving the club at the end of the 1933–34 season, joining Bristol Rovers.

He joined Millwall in 1935, making six league appearances, before finishing his professional career with Bristol City without breaking into the first team.
