= Ernest Lewis (footballer) =

Welsh footballer

Personal information
- Full name: Ernest G. Lewis
- Place of birth: Cardiff, Wales
- Position: Inside forward

Senior career*
Years	Team	Apps	(Gls)
1933–1934	Cardiff City	14	(1)
- * Club domestic league appearances and goals

Ernest G. Lewis was a Welsh professional footballer who played as an inside forward. He made fourteen appearances in the Football League for Cardiff City.
