= Eli Postin =

English footballer

Eli Postin (3 June 1908 – 1991) was an English professional footballer who played as an outside right or inside right.

Postin started playing football for Cradley Heath, Staffordshire (now in the West Midlands), where he was spotted by West Bromwich Albion scouts in 1931 and was signed and played that season in the second team. He was transferred then to Cardiff City and then on to Bristol Rovers. While at Cardiff City he was the club's joint top scorer in the 1933–34 season. He later played for Wrexham where he changed from professional to semi-professional and signed for Brierley Hill Alliance. He still played as an amateur at the age of 50. The supporters always yelled out "Nod 'em in, Eli" as he went up for a header in the box.

Postin earned a 'Junior International Cap' he was awarded for representing the Birmingham County FA against Scotland Juniors at Villa Park in 1931. The B.C.F.A beat Scotland 5–2 with Eli scoring two of the goals.
