= John Duthie (footballer, born 1903) =

Scottish footballer (1903–1969)

Personal information
- Full name: John Flett Duthie
- Date of birth: 7 January 1903
- Place of birth: Fraserburgh, Scotland
- Date of death: 1969 (aged 65–66)
- Position: Wing half

Senior career*
Years	Team	Apps	(Gls)
- Fraserburgh Town
1922–1923	Hartlepool United	0	(0)
1923	Clydebank		
1923–1924	Hartlepool United	3	(0)
1924–1927	Norwich City		
1927–1928	Queens Park Rangers	11	
1928–1929	York City		
1929–1930	Crystal Palace		
1930–1931	York City		
1931–1932	Crewe Alexandra		
1932	Aberdeen		
1932–1933	Workingtin		
1933–1934	Cardiff City	13	(0)
1934–1935	Caerau		
1935–1936	Peterborough United	43	(2)
- * Club domestic league appearances and goals

John Flett Duthie (7 January 1903 — 1969) was a Scottish professional footballer who played as a wing half.

== Career ==
Born in Fraserburgh, Duthie began his career with his local side Fraserburgh Town before joining Football League side Hartlepool United in 1922. He was unable to break into the first team, making no appearances, and returned to Scotland to play for Clydebank. He rejoined Hartlepool the following season and made his debut on 10 November 1923 in a 0–0 draw with New Brighton. He made three further appearances, scoring once in a 10–1 victory over St Peter's Albion in the FA Cup, before leaving the club at the end of the season.

He joined Cardiff City in 1933 but the club endured a difficult season, finishing bottom of the Third Division South, and he was released. He later played for Welsh league side Caerau and Midland Football League side Peterborough United.
