= Ben Watts-Jones =

Welsh football manager (1885–1949)

Personal information
- Full name: Benjamin Watts Jones
- Date of birth: 7 January 1885
- Place of birth: Swansea, Wales
- Date of death: 3 July 1949 (aged 64)
- Place of death: Swansea, Wales

Managerial career
- Years: Team
- 1934–1937: Cardiff City

Benjamin Watts-Jones (7 January 1885 – 3 July 1949) was a Welsh football manager and chairman.

Jones originated from Swansea and was the eldest son of Swansea mayor Ben Jones. For many years he worked as a draper.

He was founder, director and chairman of Swansea Town, helping them gain admission to The Football League in 1921, as well as serving on the selection committee of the Football Association of Wales when he was appointed manager of Cardiff City in February 1934, taking charge as the club was in its lowest position since entering the Football League in 1920 after finishing bottom of Division Three South.

At the start of the 1934–35 season, Jones released all but five of the clubs professional players and brought in 17 new players in their place but had little cash to spend and struggled to turn the side around. In 1936 he appointed former Wales international Bill Jennings as a coach and would eventually step down as manager in order for Jennings to take over in 1937. He instead took a place on the board which he held until the outbreak of World War II.

He died suddenly of a heart attack at his home in Swansea.

== Managerial statistics ==
Team	Country	From	To	Record				
Team	Country	From	To	G	W	D	L	Win %
Cardiff City	(Wales)	3 March 1934	April 1937	141	41	29	71	29.08
Total				141	41	29	71	29.08
