= 1938–39 Cardiff City F.C. season =

Welsh football club season

Cardiff City
1938–39 season
- Chairman: Chris Page (To September 1938); William Forbes (To April 1939) (Wales) Sir Herbert Merrett
- Manager: (Wales) Bill Jennings (To April 1939) (England) Cyril Spiers
- Division Three South: 13th
- FA Cup: 4th round
- Welsh Cup: Runners Up
- Third Division South Cup: 1st round
- Top goalscorer: League: Jimmy Collins (18); All: Jimmy Collins (21)
- Highest home attendance: 40,187 (v Newport County, 31 December 1938)
- Lowest home attendance: 5,070 (v Notts County, 17 April 1939)
- Average home league attendance: 14,107
Home colours

The 1938–39 season was Cardiff City F.C.'s 19th season in the Football League. They competed in the 22-team Division Three South, then the third tier of English football, finishing 13th.

== Season review ==
=== Football League Third Division South ===
==== Partial league table ====
Pos	Team	Pld	W	D	L	GF	GA	GAv	Pts
11	Notts County	42	17	9	16	59	54	1.093	43
12	Southend United	42	16	9	17	61	64	0.953	41
13	Cardiff City	42	15	11	16	61	65	0.938	41
14	Exeter City	42	13	14	15	65	82	0.793	40
15	Bournemouth & Boscombe Athletic	42	13	13	16	52	58	0.897	39

=== Results by round ===
Round	1	2	3	4	5	6	7	8	9	10	11	12	13	14	15	16	17	18	19	20	21	22	23	24	25	26	27	28	29	30	31	32	33	34	35	36	37	38	39	40	41	42
Ground	H	A	A	H	A	H	A	H	A	H	A	H	A	H	A	A	A	A	H	A	H	H	H	H	A	A	H	A	H	A	H	A	H	A	A	H	H	A	H	H	H	A
Result	L	D	L	W	W	L	D	W	D	L	L	W	D	W	L	D	W	D	W	L	L	W	W	L	D	W	W	D	W	L	L	L	L	D	L	L	W	D	W	W	D	L
Position	~	~	17	15	13	16	15	13	12	14	18	15	14	10	12	15	12	11	11	12	12	12	11	12	12	11	9	12	7	10	10	12	12	12	12	15	13	13	11	11	12	13
Points	0	1	1	3	5	5	6	8	9	9	9	11	12	14	14	15	17	18	20	20	20	22	24	24	25	27	29	30	32	32	32	32	32	33	33	33	35	36	38	40	41	41

A = Away; H = Home; W = Win; D = Draw; L = Loss

== Players ==
First team squad. Note: Flags indicate national team as defined under FIFA eligibility rules; some limited exceptions apply. Players may hold more than one non-FIFA nationality.

No.	Pos.	Nation	Player
--	GK	ENG	Bob Jones
--	GK	ENG	Bill Fielding
--	DF	WAL	George Ballsom
--	DF	NIR	Bill Corkhill
--	DF	WAL	Louis Ford
--	DF	WAL	Arthur Granville
--	DF	SCO	Jim Kelso
--	DF	WAL	Thomas Williams
--	MF	WAL	Billy Baker
--	MF	ENG	Cecil McCaughey
--	MF	ENG	Bill Main
--	MF	ENG	George Nicholson
--	MF	ENG	Arthur Rhodes
--	MF	WAL	Terry Wood

No.	Pos.	Nation	Player
--	FW	ENG	Reg Anderson
--	FW	ENG	Billy Bassett
--	FW	ENG	Jimmy Collins
--	FW	WAL	Jack Court
--	FW	ENG	Harry Egan
--	FW	WAL	Charles Hill
--	FW	WAL	James McKenzie
--	FW	ENG	Jack Prescott
--	FW	WAL	Reg Pugh
--	FW	ENG	Tex Rickards
--	FW	SCO	Ritchie Smith
--	FW	ENG	Les Talbot
--	FW	ENG	Bert Turner
--	FW	ENG	George Walton

== Fixtures and results ==
=== Third Division South ===
27 August 1938 1	Cardiff City	1–2	Exeter City	Cardiff
	Bert Turner		Goal	Stadium: Ninian Park; Attendance: 24,645

31 August 1938 2	Mansfield Town	2–2	Cardiff City	Mansfield
	Tommy Dutton; Tommy Dutton		Jimmy Collins; Jimmy Collins	Stadium: Field Mill; Attendance: 6,959

3 September 1938 3	Newport County	3–0	Cardiff City	Newport
	Arthur Hydes; Arthur Hydes; Lance Carr			Stadium: Somerton Park; Attendance: 18,837

5 September 1938 4	Cardiff City	2–1	Walsall	Cardiff
	Jimmy Collins; Jimmy Collins		Goal	Stadium: Ninian Park; Attendance: 15,697

10 September 1938 5	Ipswich Town	1–2	Cardiff City	Ipswich
	Gilbert Alsop		Tex Rickards; Jack Prescott	Stadium: Portman Road; Attendance: 16,179

17 September 1938 6	Cardiff City	0–1	Reading	Cardiff
			Goal	Stadium: Ninian Park; Attendance: 15,843

24 September 1938 7	Bristol Rovers	1–1	Cardiff City	Bristol
	Goal		Les Talbot	Stadium: Eastville; Attendance: 10,046

1 October 1938 8	Cardiff City	4–1	Brighton & Hove Albion	Cardiff
	Jack Prescott; Jimmy Collins; Jimmy Collins; Tex Rickards		Goal	Stadium: Ninian Park; Attendance: 17,393

8 October 1938 9	Bournemouth	0–0	Cardiff City	Bournemouth
				Stadium: Dean Court; Attendance: 7,211

15 October 1938 10	Cardiff City	1–2	Clapton Orient	Cardiff
	Les Talbot		Goal	Stadium: Ninian Park; Attendance: 16,317

22 October 1938 11	Northampton Town	2–1	Cardiff City	Northampton
	Goal		Jack Prescott	Stadium: County Ground; Attendance: 10,262

29 October 1938 12	Cardiff City	2–1	Swindon Town	Cardiff
15:15	Tex Rickards 20'; Jimmy Collins 80'		10' Ben Morton	Stadium: Ninian Park; Attendance: 12,000; Referee: GS Blackhall

5 November 1938 13	Port Vale	1–1	Cardiff City	Stoke
	Tom Nolan		Jimmy Collins	Stadium: Vale Park; Attendance: 12,500

12 November 1938 14	Cardiff City	5–3	Watford	Cardiff
	Jimmy Collins; Jimmy Collins; Jimmy Collins; Cecil McCaughey; Charles Hill		Goal	Stadium: Ninian Park; Attendance: 11,646

19 November 1938 15	Crystal Palace	2–0	Cardiff City	London
	Goal			Stadium: Selhurst Park; Attendance: 17,898

3 December 1938 16	Aldershot	1–1	Cardiff City	Aldershot
	Goal		Jimmy Collins	Stadium: Recreation Ground; Attendance: 5,699

17 December 1938 17	Torquay United	1–3	Cardiff City	Torquay
	Goal		Les Talbot; Les Talbot; Jimmy Collins	Stadium: Plainmoor; Attendance: 2,257

24 December 1938 18	Exeter City	1–1	Cardiff City	Exeter
	Goal		Harry Egan	Stadium: St James Park; Attendance: 4,242

26 December 1938 19	Cardiff City	1–0	Queens Park Rangers	Cardiff
	Jimmy Collins			Stadium: Ninian Park; Attendance: 26,744

27 December 1938 20	Queens Park Rangers	5–0	Cardiff City	London
	Jack Cape; Tommy Cheetham; Tommy Cheetham; John Devine; Len McCarthy			Stadium: Loftus Road; Attendance: 14,799

31 December 1938 21	Cardiff City	1–2	Newport County	Cardiff
	Ritchie Smith		Arthur Hydes; Lance Carr	Stadium: Ninian Park; Attendance: 40,187

11 January 1939 22	Cardiff City	2–1	Bristol City	Cardiff
	Ritchie Smith; George Walton		Goal	Stadium: Ninian Park; Attendance: 8,645

14 January 1939 23	Cardiff City	2–1	Ipswich Town	Cardiff
	Ossie Parry (o.g.); Jimmy Collins		Charlie Fletcher	Stadium: Ninian Park; Attendance: 15,312

28 January 1939 24	Cardiff City	0–2	Bristol Rovers	Cardiff
			Goal	Stadium: Ninian Park; Attendance: 12,659

1 February 1939 25	Reading	0–0	Cardiff City	Reading
				Stadium: Elm Park; Attendance: 3,623

4 February 1939 26	Brighton & Hove Albion	1–2	Cardiff City	Brighton
	Goal		Harry Egan; Jimmy Collins	Stadium: Goldstone Ground; Attendance: 9,770

11 February 1939 27	Cardiff City	5–0	Bournemouth	Cardiff
	Harry Egan; Harry Egan; Tex Rickards; George Walton; James McKenzie			Stadium: Ninian Park; Attendance: 12,309

18 February 1939 28	Clapton Orient	1–1	Cardiff City	London
	Goal		Harry Egan	Stadium: Brisbane Road; Attendance: 9,035

25 February 1939 29	Cardiff City	2–0	Northampton Town	Cardiff
	Tex Rickards; Cecil McCaughey			Stadium: Ninian Park; Attendance: 10,282

4 March 1939 30	Swindon Town	4–1	Cardiff City	Swindon
	Ben Morton 4'; Ben Morton 84'; Cliff Francis 15'; Arthur Barraclough 89'		43' Harry Egan	Stadium: County Ground; Attendance: 8,861; Referee: GS Blackhall

11 March 1939 31	Cardiff City	2–4	Port Vale	Cardiff
	Harry Egan; Les Talbot		Leonard Smart; Leonard Smart; Tommy Ward; Tom Nolan	Stadium: Ninian Park; Attendance: 9,145

18 March 1939 32	Watford	1–0	Cardiff City	Watford
	Goal			Stadium: Vicarage Road; Attendance: 6,714

25 March 1939 33	Cardiff City	0–1	Crystal Palace	Cardiff
			Goal	Stadium: Ninian Park; Attendance: 11,910

1 April 1939 34	Bristol City	1–1	Cardiff City	Bristol
	Goal		Harry Egan	Stadium: Ashton Gate; Attendance: 10,003

7 April 1939 35	Southend United	2–0	Cardiff City	Southend
	Goal			Stadium: Roots Hall; Attendance: 9,299

8 April 1939 36	Cardiff City	2–4	Aldershot	Cardiff
	Jack Prescott; Harry Egan		George Raynor; George Raynor; Cecil Ray; Cecil Ray	Stadium: Ninian Park; Attendance: 9,060

10 April 1939 37	Cardiff City	1–0	Southend United	Cardiff
	Reg Pugh			Stadium: Ninian Park; Attendance: 8,220

15 April 1939 38	Notts County	1–1	Cardiff City	Nottingham
	Goal		James McKenzie	Stadium: Meadow Lane; Attendance: 7,640

17 April 1939 39	Cardiff City	4–1	Notts County	Cardiff
	Les Talbot; Les Talbot; Reginald Anderson; Reg Pugh		Goal	Stadium: Ninian Park; Attendance: 5,070

22 April 1939 40	Cardiff City	3–1	Torquay United	Cardiff
15:15	Jimmy Collins; Les Talbot; Charles Hill		Goal	Stadium: Ninian Park; Attendance: 7,277; Referee: GH Hann (Shrewsbury)

29 April 1939 41	Cardiff City	0–0	Mansfield Town	Cardiff
				Stadium: Ninian Park; Attendance: 5,886

6 May 1939 42	Walsall	6–3	Cardiff City	Walsall
	George Beeson; Gilbert Alsop; Joe Bambrick; Charlie Bulger; Johnny Hancocks; Johnny Hancocks		Jimmy Collins; Les Talbot; Charles Hill	Stadium: Fellows Park; Attendance: 6,246

=== FA Cup ===
26 November 1938 Round 1	Cheltenham Town	1–1	Cardiff City	Cheltenham
14:45	Stan Prior		Jack Prescott	Stadium: Whaddon Road; Attendance: 5,600; Referee: Mr. G. W. Hann

30 November 1938 Round 1 (Replay)	Cardiff City	1–0	Cheltenham Town	Cardiff
14:00	Jack Prescott			Stadium: Ninian Park; Attendance: 8,940; Referee: Mr. G. W. Hann

10 December 1938 Round 2	Cardiff City	1–0	Crewe Alexandra	Cardiff
	Les Talbot			Stadium: Ninian Park; Attendance: 19,000

7 January 1939 Round 3	Cardiff City	1–0	Charlton Athletic	Cardiff
	George Walton			Stadium: Ninian Park; Attendance: 22,780

21 January 1939 Round 4	Cardiff City	0–0	Newcastle United	Cardiff
				Stadium: Ninian Park; Attendance: 42,060

25 January 1939 Round 4 (Replay)	Newcastle United	4–1	Cardiff City	Newcastle
	Harry Clifton; Jimmy Gordon; Tom Mooney; John Park		Reg Pugh	Stadium: St James's Park; Attendance: 44,649

=== Welsh Cup ===
8 February 1939 Round 5	Cardiff City	2–2	Swansea Town	Cardiff
	James McKenzie; Cecil McCaughey		Tommy Olsen; Tommy Bamford	Stadium: Ninian Park; Attendance: 4,000

23 February 1939 Round 5 (Replay)	Swansea Town	1–4	Cardiff City	Swansea
	Willie Imrie		Harry Egan; Harry Egan; Tex Rickards; Tex Rickards	Stadium: Vetch Field; Attendance: 1,500

8 March 1939 Round 6	Cardiff City	5–1	Newport County	Cardiff
	Harry Egan; Harry Egan; Harry Egan; Tex Rickards; James McKenzie		Andrew Higgins	Stadium: Ninian Park; Attendance: 6,000

30 March 1939 Semi Final	Oswestry	1–1	Cardiff City	Shrewsbury
	Goal		(pen.) Arthur Granville	Stadium: Gay Meadow; Attendance: 3,000

13 April 1939 Semi Final (Replay)	Oswestry	2–2	Cardiff City	Shrewsbury
	Goal		Les Talbot; Jimmy Collins	Stadium: Gay Meadow; Attendance: 3,000

26 April 1939 Semi Final (Second replay)	Oswestry	1–2	Cardiff City	Shrewsbury
	Goal		Les Talbot; Jimmy Collins	Stadium: Gay Meadow; Attendance: 5,000

4 May 1939 Final	South Liverpool	2–1	Cardiff City	Wrexham
	G Jones; G Jones		Jimmy Collins	Stadium: The Racecourse; Attendance: 5,000; Referee: F McCarthy (Wrexham)

=== Third Division South Cup ===
16 November 1938 Round 1	Bristol City	6–0	Cardiff City	Bristol
	Harry Mardon; Harry Mardon; Frank Gallacher; Monty Morgan; Monty Morgan; Cliff Morgan			Stadium: Ashton Gate; Attendance: 670
