= 1936–37 Cardiff City F.C. season =

Welsh football club season

Cardiff City
1936–37 season
- Chairman: Dr James Wade
- Manager: (Wales) Ben Watts-Jones (Wales) Bill Jennings (from April)
- Division Three South: 18th
- FA Cup: 3rd round
- Welsh Cup: 8th round
- Third Division South Cup: 2nd round
- Top goalscorer: League: George Walton; Reg Pugh; Cecil Smith; Les Talbot (7); All: George Walton (9)
- Highest home attendance: 31,954 (v Walsall, 26 December 1936)
- Lowest home attendance: 5,940 (v Aldershot, 19 April 1937)
- Average home league attendance: 15,661
Home colours

The 1936–37 season was Cardiff City F.C.'s 17th season in the Football League. They competed in the 22-team Division Three South, then the third tier of English football, finishing 18th. The team played in the FA Cup, Welsh Cup, and the Third Division South Cup, being eliminated in the 3rd round, 8th round, and 2nd round, respectively.

== Season review ==
=== Football League Third Division South ===
==== Partial league table ====
Pos	Team	Pld	W	D	L	GF	GA	GAv	Pts
16	Bristol City	42	15	6	21	58	70	0.829	36
17	Walsall	42	13	10	19	63	85	0.741	36
18	Cardiff City	42	14	7	21	54	87	0.621	35
19	Newport County	42	12	10	20	67	98	0.684	34
20	Torquay United	42	11	10	21	57	80	0.713	32

Rules for classification: 1) Points; 2) Goal average; 3) Goals scored

=== Results by round ===
Round	1	2	3	4	5	6	7	8	9	10	11	12	13	14	15	16	17	18	19	20	21	22	23	24	25	26	27	28	29	30	31	32	33	34	35	36	37	38	39	40	41	42
Ground	A	H	H	A	A	H	A	H	H	A	H	A	H	A	H	A	A	A	A	H	H	A	H	H	A	H	A	A	H	A	H	A	A	H	H	A	H	H	A	H	H	A
Result	L	W	W	W	W	W	D	W	D	L	W	L	L	W	W	L	L	D	L	D	L	L	L	D	L	D	L	L	D	L	W	L	L	W	L	L	L	L	W	W	W	L
Points	0	2	4	6	8	10	11	13	14	14	16	16	16	18	20	20	20	21	21	22	22	22	22	23	23	24	24	24	25	25	27	27	27	29	29	29	29	29	31	33	35	35
Position	~	~	6	2	4	1	1	1	1	1	1	3	3	2	2	3	7	9	13	13	13	14	14	14	17	16	18	18	18	18	18	18	18	17	18	19	20	20	20	17	16	18

A = Away; H = Home; W = Win; D = Draw; L = Loss

== Players ==
First team squad. Note: Flags indicate national team as defined under FIFA eligibility rules; some limited exceptions apply. Players may hold more than one non-FIFA nationality.

No.	Pos.	Nation	Player
--	GK	ENG	Bill Fielding
--	GK	WAL	George Poland
--	DF	SCO	Jack Eslor
--	DF	WAL	Louis Ford
--	DF	ENG	Cliff Godfrey
--	DF	WAL	Arthur Granville
--	DF	SCO	Bob McAuley
--	DF	ENG	Jack Mellor
--	DF	SCO	Bill Main
--	MF	ENG	George Nicholson
--	FW	ENG	Billy Bassett
--	FW	WAL	James McKenzie
--	FW	EIR	Ted Melaniphy

No.	Pos.	Nation	Player
--	FW	SCO	Davie Ovenstone
--	FW	ENG	Albert Pinxton
--	FW	ENG	Jack Prescott
--	FW	WAL	Reg Pugh
--	FW	WAL	Doug Redwood
--	FW	ENG	Harry Roper
--	FW	WAL	Cecil Smith
--	FW	ENG	Harold Smith
--	FW	ENG	James A Smith
--	FW	ENG	Les Talbot
--	FW	ENG	George Walton
--	FW	ENG	Arthur Welsby
--	FW	WAL	Daniel Williams

== Fixtures and results ==
=== Third Division South ===
29 August 1936 1	Walsall	1–0	Cardiff City	Walsall
	Goal			Stadium: Fellows Park; Attendance: 10,268

31 August 1936 2	Cardiff City	2–1	Clapton Orient	Cardiff
	Reg Pugh; Cecil Smith		Goal	Stadium: Ninian Park; Attendance: 16,698; Referee: JM Wiltshire (Sherborne)

5 September 1936 3	Cardiff City	3–0	Luton Town	Cardiff
	Cecil Smith 17'; Cecil Smith; Reg Pugh	Luton report		Stadium: Ninian Park; Attendance: 17,915; Referee: E Gamson (Kidderminster)

10 September 1936 4	Clapton Orient	0–1	Cardiff City	London
			Reg Pugh	Stadium: Brisbane Road; Attendance: 5,471

12 September 1936 5	Newport County	2–3	Cardiff City	Newport
	Bill Owen; Bill Owen		Davie Ovenstone; Les Talbot; Cecil Smith	Stadium: Somerton Park; Attendance: 16,732

14 September 1936 6	Cardiff City	3–1	Bristol City	Cardiff
	Reg Pugh; Albert Pinxton; Les Talbot		Goal	Stadium: Ninian Park; Attendance: 24,936

19 September 1936 7	Crystal Palace	2–2	Cardiff City	London
	Goal		Cecil Smith; Reg Pugh	Stadium: Selhurst Park; Attendance: 18,348

26 September 1936 8	Cardiff City	3–1	Exeter City	Cardiff
	Davie Ovenstone; Les Talbot; Cecil Smith		Goal	Stadium: Ninian Park; Attendance: 21,749

28 September 1936 9	Cardiff City	1–1	Southend United	Cardiff
	Albert Pinxton		Goal	Stadium: Ninian Park; Attendance: 26,094

3 October 1936 10	Reading	3–0	Cardiff City	Reading
	Goal			Stadium: Elm Park; Attendance: 13,209

10 October 1936 11	Cardiff City	2–0	Queens Park Rangers	Cardiff
	Les Talbot; Daniel Williams			Stadium: Ninian Park; Attendance: 21,897

24 October 1936 12	Watford	2–0	Cardiff City	Watford
	Goal			Stadium: Vicarage Road; Attendance: 13,209

31 October 1936 13	Cardiff City	1–2	Brighton & Hove Albion	Cardiff
	Arthur Granville (pen.)		Goal	Stadium: Ninian Park; Attendance: 17,805

7 November 1936 14	Bournemouth	0–2	Cardiff City	Bournemouth
			Les Talbot; George Walton	Stadium: Dean Court; Attendance: 9,231

14 November 1936 15	Cardiff City	2–1	Northampton Town	Cardiff
	Reg Pugh; George Walton		Goal	Stadium: Ninian Park; Attendance: 18,200

21 November 1936 16	Bristol Rovers	5–1	Cardiff City	Bristol
	Goal		Les Talbot	Stadium: Eastville; Attendance: 17,171

5 December 1936 17	Swindon Town	4–2	Cardiff City	Swindon
	Jimmy Cookson 10', 15'; Eddie Jones 26', 35'		25' Jack Prescott; 60' Cecil Smith	Stadium: County Ground; Attendance: 10,532

19 December 1936 18	Gillingham	0–0	Cardiff City	Gillingham
				Stadium: Priestfield Stadium; Attendance: 8,361

25 December 1936 19	Torquay United	1–0	Cardiff City	Torquay
	Goal			Stadium: Plainmoor; Attendance: 4,582

26 December 1936 20	Cardiff City	2–2	Walsall	Cardiff
	George Walton; Ted Melaniphy		Goal	Stadium: Ninian Park; Attendance: 31,954

28 December 1936 21	Cardiff City	0–2	Torquay United	Cardiff
			Goal	Stadium: Ninian Park; Attendance: 12,048

2 January 1937 22	Luton Town	8–1	Cardiff City	Luton
14:30	Joe Payne 20' (??); George Stephenson (??); Bert Dawes	Luton report	Jack Prescott	Stadium: Kenilworth Road; Attendance: 12,368; Referee: E Gamson (Kidderminster)

9 January 1937 23	Cardiff City	0–1	Newport County	Cardiff
			Harry Duggan	Stadium: Ninian Park; Attendance: 24,681

23 January 1937 24	Cardiff City	1–1	Crystal Palace	Cardiff
	Les Talbot		Goal	Stadium: Ninian Park; Attendance: 9,415

3 February 1937 25	Exeter City	3–1	Cardiff City	Exeter
	Goal		Albert Pinxton	Stadium: St James Park; Attendance: 2,298

6 February 1937 26	Cardiff City	1–1	Reading	Cardiff
	George Walton		Goal	Stadium: Ninian Park; Attendance: 10,569

13 February 1937 27	Queens Park Rangers	6–0	Cardiff City	London
	Goal			Stadium: Loftus Road; Attendance: 11,408

20 February 1937 28	Southend United	8–1	Cardiff City	Southend
	Goal		Cecil Smith	Stadium: Roots Hall; Attendance: 7,100

27 February 1937 29	Cardiff City	2–2	Watford	Cardiff
	Arthur Granville (pen.); George Walton		Goal	Stadium: Ninian Park; Attendance: 6,283

6 March 1937 30	Brighton & Hove Albion	7–2	Cardiff City	Brighton
	Goal		James McKenzie (pen.) Arthur Granville	Stadium: Goldstone Ground; Attendance: 10,632

13 March 1937 31	Cardiff City	2–1	Bournemouth	Cardiff
	James McKenzie; James McKenzie		Goal	Stadium: Ninian Park; Attendance: 8,582

20 March 1937 32	Northampton Town	2–0	Cardiff City	Northampton
	Goal			Stadium: County Ground; Attendance: 7,334

26 March 1937 33	Notts County	4–0	Cardiff City	Nottingham
	Goal			Stadium: Meadow Lane; Attendance: 17,664

27 March 1937 34	Cardiff City	3–1	Bristol Rovers	Cardiff
	James McKenzie; Reg Pugh; Arthur Granville (pen.)		Goal	Stadium: Ninian Park; Attendance: 9,666

29 March 1937 35	Cardiff City	0–2	Notts County	Cardiff
			Goal	Stadium: Ninian Park; Attendance: 20,245

3 April 1937 36	Millwall	3–1	Cardiff City	London
	Goal		(pen.) Arthur Granville	Stadium: The Den; Attendance: 19,489

10 April 1937 37	Cardiff City	1–2	Swindon Town	Cardiff
	George Walton 25'		37' Jimmy Cookson; 82' Joe Musgrave	Stadium: Ninian Park; Attendance: 9,066

12 April 1937 38	Cardiff City	0–1	Millwall	Cardiff
			Goal	Stadium: Ninian Park; Attendance: 6,775

17 April 1937 39	Aldershot	0–1	Cardiff City	Aldershot
			Ted Melaniphy	Stadium: Recreation Ground; Attendance: 3,084

19 April 1937 40	Cardiff City	4–1	Aldershot	Cardiff
	George Walton; Ted Melaniphy; Ted Melaniphy; Davie Ovenstone		Goal	Stadium: Ninian Park; Attendance: 5,940

24 April 1937 41	Cardiff City	2–0	Gillingham	Cardiff
	Ted Melaniphy; Davie Ovenstone			Stadium: Ninian Park; Attendance: 8,358

1 May 1937 42	Bristol City	2–1	Cardiff City	Bristol
	Goal		(o.g.) Jack Hick	Stadium: Ashton Gate; Attendance: 4,360

=== FA Cup ===
28 November 1936 Round 1	Cardiff City	3–1	Southall	Cardiff
	George Walton; Les Talbot; Reg Pugh		Goal	Stadium: Ninian Park; Attendance: 14,000

12 December 1936 Round 2	Cardiff City	2–1	Swindon Town	Cardiff
	Arthur Granville 69' (pen.); Jack Prescott 87'		8' Jimmy Cookson	Stadium: Ninian Park; Attendance: 18,833; Referee: E Vokes

16 January 1937 Round 3	Cardiff City	1–3	Grimsby Town	Cardiff
	Ted Melaniphy		Goal	Stadium: Ninian Park; Attendance: 36,245

=== Welsh Cup ===
10 March 1937 Round 6	Barry Town	3–1	Cardiff City	Barry
	Goal		George Walton	Stadium: Jenner Park; Attendance: 5,000

=== Third Division South Cup ===
28 October 1936 Round 1	Cardiff City	0–1	Exeter City	Cardiff
			Goal	Stadium: Ninian Park; Attendance: 3,000
