= 1937–38 Cardiff City F.C. season =

Welsh football club season

Cardiff City
1937–38 season
- Chairman: Chris Page
- Manager: (Wales) Bill Jennings
- Division Three South: 10th
- FA Cup: 3rd round
- Welsh Cup: 6th round
- Third Division South Cup: 2nd round
- Top goalscorer: League: Jimmy Collins (23); All: Jimmy Collins (28)
- Highest home attendance: 37,726 (v Mansfield Town, 27 December 1937)
- Lowest home attendance: 7,610 (v Aldershot, 9 April 1938)
- Average home league attendance: 20,009
Home colours

The 1937–38 season was Cardiff City F.C.'s 18th season in the Football League. They competed in the 22-team Division Three South, then the third tier of English football, finishing 10th.

== Season review ==
=== Football League Third Division South ===
==== Partial league table ====
Pos	Team	Pld	W	D	L	GF	GA	GAv	Pts
8	Swindon Town	42	17	10	15	49	49	1.000	44
9	Northampton Town	42	17	9	16	51	57	0.895	43
10	Cardiff City	42	15	12	15	67	54	1.241	42
11	Notts County	42	16	9	17	50	50	1.000	41
12	Southend United	42	15	10	17	70	68	1.029	40

=== Results by round ===
Round	1	2	3	4	5	6	7	8	9	10	11	12	13	14	15	16	17	18	19	20	21	22	23	24	25	26	27	28	29	30	31	32	33	34	35	36	37	38	39	40	41	42
Ground	A	H	H	A	A	H	H	A	H	H	A	H	A	H	A	H	H	H	A	H	H	A	A	H	A	H	A	A	H	A	H	A	H	A	H	H	A	A	H	A	A	A
Result	D	W	W	W	L	W	W	L	D	W	D	D	L	W	L	D	W	W	L	W	W	D	L	D	L	W	L	L	W	W	D	L	D	L	L	D	L	L	W	L	D	D
Position	~	~	3	1	3	1	1	3	3	2	2	2	4	2	4	4	4	4	4	3	4	2	4	4	4	3	5	7	5	4	5	8	7	10	11	11	11	11	10	11	10	10
Points	1	3	5	7	7	9	11	11	12	14	15	16	16	18	18	19	21	23	23	25	27	28	28	29	29	31	31	31	33	35	36	36	37	37	37	38	38	38	40	40	41	42

A = Away; H = Home; W = Win; D = Draw; L = Loss

== Players ==
First team squad. Note: Flags indicate national team as defined under FIFA eligibility rules; some limited exceptions apply. Players may hold more than one non-FIFA nationality.

No.	Pos.	Nation	Player
--	GK	ENG	Bob Jones
--	DF	ENG	Ernie Blenkinsop
--	DF	WAL	Louis Ford
--	DF	ENG	Cliff Godfrey
--	DF	WAL	Arthur Granville
--	DF	ENG	Jack Mellor
--	DF	WAL	Enoch Mort
--	DF	WAL	Thomas Williams
--	MF	ENG	Cecil McCaughey
--	MF	ENG	George Nicholson

No.	Pos.	Nation	Player
--	FW	ENG	Billy Bassett
--	FW	ENG	Jimmy Collins
--	FW	WAL	James McKenzie
--	FW	EIR	Ted Melaniphy
--	FW	ENG	Jack Prescott
--	FW	WAL	Reg Pugh
--	FW	ENG	Les Talbot
--	FW	ENG	Bert Turner
--	FW	ENG	George Walton

== Fixtures and results ==
=== Third Division South ===
28 August 1937 1	Clapton Orient	1–1	Cardiff City	London
	Goal		Jimmy Collins	Stadium: Brisbane Road; Attendance: 14,598

30 August 1937 2	Cardiff City	5–2	Torquay United	Cardiff
	Jimmy Collins; Jimmy Collins; Jimmy Collins; George Walton; Bert Turner		Goal	Stadium: Ninian Park; Attendance: 20,796

4 September 1937 3	Cardiff City	5–0	Southend United	Cardiff
	Les Talbot; Les Talbot; George Walton; Arthur Granville (pen.); Bert Turner			Stadium: Ninian Park; Attendance: 22,912

8 September 1937 4	Torquay United	0–1	Cardiff City	Torquay
			Jimmy Collins	Stadium: Plainmoor; Attendance: 5,970

11 September 1937 5	Queens Park Rangers	2–1	Cardiff City	London
	Goal		Bert Turner	Stadium: Loftus Road; Attendance: 15,300

13 September 1937 6	Cardiff City	4–1	Northampton Town	Cardiff
	Cliff Godfrey; Jimmy Collins; Jimmy Collins; Bert Turner		Goal	Stadium: Ninian Park; Attendance: 20,693

18 September 1937 7	Cardiff City	4–1	Brighton & Hove Albion	Cardiff
	George Walton; Jimmy Collins; Jimmy Collins; Bert Turner		Goal	Stadium: Ninian Park; Attendance: 28,034

25 September 1937 8	Bournemouth	3–0	Cardiff City	Bournemouth
	Goal			Stadium: Dean Court; Attendance: 10,320

2 October 1937 9	Cardiff City	2–2	Notts County	Cardiff
	Bert Turner; Bert Turner		Goal	Stadium: Ninian Park; Attendance: 35,468

9 October 1937 10	Cardiff City	3–1	Walsall	Cardiff
	Jimmy Collins; Reg Pugh; Bert Turner		Goal	Stadium: Ninian Park; Attendance: 19,086

16 October 1937 11	Newport County	1–1	Cardiff City	Newport
	Goal		Les Talbot	Stadium: Somerton Park; Attendance: 24,268

23 October 1937 12	Cardiff City	0–0	Bristol City	Cardiff
				Stadium: Ninian Park; Attendance: 17,858

30 October 1937 13	Watford	4–0	Cardiff City	Watford
	Goal			Stadium: Vicarage Road; Attendance: 11,183

6 November 1937 14	Cardiff City	4–0	Gillingham	Cardiff
	Bert Turner; Jimmy Collins; George Walton; Les Talbot			Stadium: Ninian Park; Attendance: 14,818

13 November 1937 15	Exeter City	2–1	Cardiff City	Exeter
	Goal		Jimmy Collins	Stadium: St James Park; Attendance: 9,541

20 November 1937 16	Cardiff City	2–2	Swindon Town	Cardiff
	Jimmy Collins 22'; Cecil McCaughey 70'		50' Jack Bradley; 57' Jack Bradley	Stadium: Ninian Park; Attendance: 15,404; Referee: FJ Lowe

4 December 1937 17	Cardiff City	3–2	Millwall	Cardiff
	Reg Pugh; Cecil McCaughey; George Walton		Goal	Stadium: Ninian Park; Attendance: 16,160

18 December 1937 18	Cardiff City	4–2	Crystal Palace	Cardiff
	Bert Turner; Bert Turner (pen.); Jimmy Collins; Les Talbot		Goal	Stadium: Ninian Park; Attendance: 18,374

25 December 1937 19	Mansfield Town	3–0	Cardiff City	Mansfield
	Maxey Holmes; Maxey Holmes; Harold Crawshaw			Stadium: Field Mill; Attendance: 12,114

27 December 1937 20	Cardiff City	4–1	Mansfield Town	Cardiff
	Reg Pugh; Jimmy Collins; Bert Turner; Bert Turner (pen.)		Charlie Johnston	Stadium: Ninian Park; Attendance: 37,726

1 January 1938 21	Cardiff City	2–0	Clapton Orient	Cardiff
	Ted Melaniphy; Ted Melaniphy			Stadium: Ninian Park; Attendance: 19,580

12 January 1938 22	Aldershot	1–1	Cardiff City	Aldershot
	Goal		Jimmy Collins	Stadium: Recreation Ground; Attendance: 2,711

15 January 1938 23	Southend United	3–1	Cardiff City	Southend
	Goal		Bert Turner	Stadium: Roots Hall; Attendance: 6,061

22 January 1938 24	Cardiff City	2–2	Queens Park Rangers	Cardiff
	George Walton; Bert Turner		Goal	Stadium: Ninian Park; Attendance: 26,268

29 January 1938 25	Brighton & Hove Albion	2–1	Cardiff City	Brighton
	Goal		Jimmy Collins	Stadium: Goldstone Ground; Attendance: 9,802

5 February 1938 26	Cardiff City	3–0	Bournemouth	Cardiff
	George Walton; Ted Melaniphy; Jimmy Collins			Stadium: Ninian Park; Attendance: 17,563

12 February 1938 27	Notts County	2–0	Cardiff City	Nottingham
	Goal			Stadium: Meadow Lane; Attendance: 13,278

19 February 1938 28	Walsall	1–0	Cardiff City	Walsall
	Goal			Stadium: Fellows Park; Attendance: 4,638

26 February 1938 29	Cardiff City	3–1	Newport County	Cardiff
	Bert Turner; Bert Turner (pen.); Reg Pugh		Tommy Wood	Stadium: Ninian Park; Attendance: 25,608

5 March 1938 30	Bristol City	0–1	Cardiff City	Bristol
			Jimmy Collins	Stadium: Ashton Gate; Attendance: 38,953

12 March 1938 31	Cardiff City	1–1	Watford	Cardiff
	Cecil McCaughey		Goal	Stadium: Ninian Park; Attendance: 25,349

19 March 1938 32	Gillingham	1–0	Cardiff City	Gillingham
	Goal			Stadium: Priestfield Stadium; Attendance: 6,710

26 March 1938 33	Cardiff City	1–1	Exeter City	Cardiff
	Jimmy Collins		Goal	Stadium: Ninian Park; Attendance: 12,065

2 April 1938 34	Swindon Town	2–0	Cardiff City	Swindon
	Ben Morton 62'; Billy Lucas 81'			Stadium: County Ground; Attendance: 8,797; Referee: FJ Lowe

9 April 1938 35	Cardiff City	0–1	Aldershot	Cardiff
			Goal	Stadium: Ninian Park; Attendance: 7,761

15 April 1938 36	Cardiff City	1–1	Bristol Rovers	Cardiff
	Jimmy Collins		Goal	Stadium: Ninian Park; Attendance: 10,384

16 April 1938 37	Millwall	1–0	Cardiff City	London
	Goal			Stadium: The Den; Attendance: 25,647

18 April 1938 38	Bristol Rovers	2–1	Cardiff City	Bristol
	Goal		Jack Prescott	Stadium: Eastville; Attendance: 9,851

23 April 1938 39	Cardiff City	4–1	Reading	Cardiff
	Bert Turner; Bert Turner; Jimmy Collins; Jimmy Collins		Goal	Stadium: Ninian Park; Attendance: 8,281

30 April 1938 40	Crystal Palace	1–0	Cardiff City	London
	Goal			Stadium: Selhurst Park; Attendance: 9,018

4 May 1938 41	Reading	0–0	Cardiff City	Reading
				Stadium: Elm Park; Attendance: 4,597

7 May 1938 42	Northampton Town	0–0	Cardiff City	Northampton
				Stadium: County Ground; Attendance: 6,410

=== FA Cup ===
27 November 1937 Round 1	Northampton Town	1–2	Cardiff City	Northampton
	Danny Tolland		Jimmy Collins; Jimmy Collins	Stadium: County Ground; Attendance: 14,000

11 December 1937 Round 2	Cardiff City	1–1	Bristol City	Cardiff
	Bert Turner		(pen.) Joe Brain	Stadium: Ninian Park; Attendance: 25,472

15 December 1937 Round 2 (replay)	Bristol City	0–2	Cardiff City	Bristol
			Jimmy Collins; Jimmy Collins	Stadium: Ashton Gate; Attendance: 23,050

8 January 1938 Round 3	Charlton Athletic	5–0	Cardiff City	London
	George Robinson; Billy Bassett (o.g.); Les Boulter; Les Owens; Les Owens			Stadium: The Valley; Attendance: 34,637

=== Welsh Cup ===
16 February 1938 Round 6	Cardiff City	0–1	Cheltenham Town	Cardiff
			Goal	Stadium: Ninian Park; Attendance: 5,000

=== Third Division South Cup ===
27 September 1937 Round 1	Northampton Town	0–1	Cardiff City	Northampton
			Bert Turner	Stadium: County Ground; Attendance: 3,869

10 November 1937 Round 2	Bristol City	2–1	Cardiff City	Bristol
	Goal		Jimmy Collins	Stadium: Ashton Gate; Attendance: 2,130
