= Barraclough =

Barraclough /ˈbærəklʌf/ is an English surname. It is derived from the place name Barrowclough, near Halifax in Yorkshire.

== People with this surname ==
- Alfred "Alf" Barraclough, English rugby union and rugby league footballer who played in the 1890s
- Arthur Barraclough (1916–2005), English footballer
- Eleanor Rosamund Barraclough, lecturer in medieval history and literature at Durham University
- Elizabeth Barraclough, American musician
- Eric Barraclough (1923–1999), English cricketer
- Ernest Barraclough, rugby league footballer who played in the 1920s and 1930s
- Fabio Barraclough (1923–2019), Anglo-Spanish academic
- Geoffrey Barraclough (1908–1984), British historian
- Sir Henry Barraclough (1874–1958), Australian mechanical engineer
- Jim Barraclough (1926–1995), English rugby league footballer who played in the 1940s and 1950s
- Jenny Barraclough (born 1937), British film and TV producer
- John Barraclough (1926–2005), Australian politician
- Sir John Barraclough (RAF officer) (1918–2008), British Air Chief Marshal
- Kyle Barraclough (born 1990), American baseball player
- Nick Barraclough (born 1951), British radio producer, presenter, musician, and writer
- Roy Barraclough (1935–2017), English comic actor
- William "Bill" Barraclough (1909–1969) English footballer
- Mr. Barraclough: George Smiley's cover name in Tinker Tailor Soldier Spy

== See also ==
- Barrowclough
- Barraclough Shield, Australian trophy for interstate rugby matches
