= James Prescott =

James Prescott may refer to:

- Jimmy Prescott (1930–2011), English footballer
- James Arthur Prescott (1890–1987), Anglo-Australian agricultural scientist
- James H. Prescott (born 1934), American politician
- James W. Prescott (born 1934), United States developmental psychologist
- James Prescott (footballer) (born 1914), English footballer
- Jim Prescott, character in 24
