= Lance Carr =

Lance Carr may refer to:

- Lance Carr (actor) (born 2000)
- Lance Carr (soccer) (1910–1983)
