= Ovenstone =

Ovenstone is a surname. Notable people with the surname include:

- Davie Ovenstone (1913–1983), Scottish footballer
- Douglas Ovenstone (1921–2011), South African cricketer
- Irene Ovenstone (fl. 1970s), inventor of the Ovenstone criteria
