= Barrowclough =

Barrowclough is an English surname. Notable people with the surname include:

- Anthony Barrowclough (1924–2003), English lawyer
- Carl Barrowclough (born 1981), English footballer
- Harold Barrowclough (1894–1972), New Zealand general, lawyer and judge
- Stewart Barrowclough (born 1951), English footballer

== See also ==
- Barraclough
