= William Egan (footballer) =

Welsh footballer

Personal information
- Full name: Thomas William Egan
- Date of birth: 1872
- Place of birth: Chirk, Wales
- Date of death: 1946 (aged 73 or 74)
- Place of death: Tibshelf, England
- Position: Inside forward

Youth career
- 1889–1892: Chirk

Senior career*
Years	Team	Apps	(Gls)
1891–1892	Chirk		
1892–1893	Fairfield		
1893–1894	Ardwick	7	(0)
1894–1895	Burnley	10	(1)
1895	Ashton North End		
1895–1896	Sheffield United	15	(4)
1896–1897	Lincoln City	16	(0)
1897–1898	Birdwell		
1898–1899	Altofts		
1899–1900	Darwen		
1901	Royston United		
1901	Stockport County	0	(0)

International career
1892	Wales	1	(0)
- * Club domestic league appearances and goals

Thomas William Egan (1872–1946) was a Welsh professional association footballer who played as an inside forward. Egan played in the Football League for Ardwick, Burnley, Sheffield United and Lincoln City. He was awarded one cap for the Wales national football team for the match against Scotland on 26 March 1892.

He started his career with his local side, Chirk F.C. as a teenager and graduated to the first team in 1891. Shortly afterwards, he moved to Manchester to join Fairfield. In the summer of 1893, he joined Ardwick before moving on to Burnley. After a month with Ashton North End in May 1895, he joined Sheffield United in November, where he replaced his former Chirk team-mate, Joe Davies. Described as a "tricky player" who had a "fine shot at goal", Egan could play in any of the forward positions.

After a season in Sheffield, in which he scored four goals from 15 league appearances, Egan moved on to Lincoln City before dropping into non-League football in 1897. After a further four years, in which he played for five clubs, he retired to return to his home town.

He later moved to Derbyshire where he worked as a miner, dying in Tibshelf in 1946. Two of his sons, Harry and Doug became professional footballers, the former with Brighton, Southend United, Aldershot and Cardiff City and the latter with Derby County and Aldershot.
