= Tex Rickards =

English footballer

Personal information
- Full name: Thomas Charles Rickards
- Date of birth: 19 February 1915
- Place of birth: Giltbrook, England
- Date of death: 1980 (aged 64–65)
- Place of death: Peterborough, England
- Height: 5 ft 8 in (1.73 m)
- Position: Outside forward

Senior career*
Years	Team	Apps	(Gls)
1932–1938	Notts County	112	(22)
1938–1939	Cardiff City	20	(5)
1948–1949	Peterborough United	133	(19)
- * Club domestic league appearances and goals

Thomas Charles Rickards (19 February 1915 — 1980), commonly known as Tex Rickards, was an English professional footballer who played as an outside forward.

== Early life ==
Rickards was born in Giltbrook, Nottinghamshire.

== Career ==
Rickards began his career with Notts County, making over 100 appearances in all competitions for the club. He joined Cardiff City in 1938 as competition for Reg Pugh and played one season at Ninian Park before the put of World War II brought an end to his professional playing career.

After the war, he joined Peterborough United in the Midland Football League. Rickards scored 13 goals in 117 appearances for the club.
