= John Devine (Scottish footballer) =

Scottish footballer

Personal information
- Full name: John Stephen Devine
- Place of birth: Glasgow, Scotland
- Height: 5 ft 8 1/2 in (1.74 m)
- Position: Inside right

Senior career*
Years	Team	Apps	(Gls)
–1935	St Roch's		
1935–1938	Aberdeen	2	(0)
1938–1940	Queens Park Rangers	7	(3)
- * Club domestic league appearances and goals

John Stephen Devine was a Scottish professional footballer who played in the Football League for Queens Park Rangers and in the Scottish League for Aberdeen as an inside right.

== Honours ==
Aberdeen

- Dewar Shield: 1935–36

== Career statistics ==
Appearances and goals by club, season and competition
Club	Season	League			National Cup		Other		Total	
Club	Season	Division	Apps	Goals	Apps	Goals	Apps	Goals	Apps	Goals
Aberdeen	1935–36	Scottish First Division	1	0	0	0	2 (Note: Appearances in Dewar Shield)	0	3	0
Aberdeen	1936–37	Scottish First Division	2	0	0	0	0	0	2	0
Aberdeen	1937–38	Scottish First Division	11	3	0	0	0	0	11	3
Aberdeen	Total		14	3	0	0	2	0	16	3
Queens Park Rangers	1938–39	Third Division South	7	0	0	0	2 (Note: 1 appearance in Third Division South Cup, 1 appearance in London Challenge Cup)	0	8	0
Career total			21	3	0	0	4	0	25	3
