= Andy Gorman =

Welsh footballer

Personal information
- Full name: Andrew David Gorman
- Date of birth: 13 September 1974 (age 52)
- Place of birth: Cardiff, Wales
- Position: Defender

Senior career*
Years	Team	Apps	(Gls)
1991–1993	Cardiff City	12	(1)
1993–1994	Yeovil Town	3	(0)
1994–1995	Barry Town	7	(0)
- * Club domestic league appearances and goals

Andrew David Gorman (born 13 September 1974) is a Welsh former professional footballer who played as a defender.

== Career ==
Gorman began his career with his hometown club Cardiff City, where his grandfather Arthur Granville had been club captain during the 1930s. After progressing through the club's youth system, he made twelve league appearances between 1991 and 1993, scoring once in a 3–3 draw with York City. However, he was released after the club won promotion to the Second Division. He later played for Yeovil Town, Barry Town and Merthyr Tydfil.

In January 2006, Gorman was appointed assistant manager at Welsh Premier League side Cardiff Grange Harlequins.

== Later life ==
Gorman went on to work as an account manager for drinks firm Stella Artois.
