= Cliff Morgan (footballer) =

English footballer

Personal information
- Full name: Clifford Ivor Morgan
- Date of birth: 26 September 1913
- Place of birth: Bristol, England
- Date of death: 31 July 1975 (aged 61)
- Place of death: Bristol, England
- Position: Right half

Youth career
- 19??–1930: St George School

Senior career*
Years	Team	Apps	(Gls)
1930–1949	Bristol City	248	(11)
1940–1945	Bristol City	203	(15)

Managerial career
- 1948–1950: Bristol City player coach
- 1950–1975: Bristol City chief scout
- * Club domestic league appearances and goals

Clifford Ivor Morgan (26 September 1913 – 31 July 1975) was an English footballer who played as a right half. He made over 240 Football League appearances in the years before and after the Second World War.

== Biography ==
Morgan was born in Bristol, where he later died at the age of 61.

== Career ==
Cliff Morgan played locally for St. George's school and in the Boys Brigade league. Morgan joined Bristol City in September 1930 as an amateur inside forward. He made his debut at inside right for Bristol City in a 1–2 defeat at Tottenham Hotspur on 12 March 1932. Morgan made 7 appearances scoring 2 goals in 1931–32 the season when Bristol City finished 22nd and were relegated from the Second Division. The following season in the Third Division South Arthur Sharp newly signed from Carlisle United was the regular inside right restricting Morgan to just 3 appearances scoring 1 goal.

In the summer of 1933, Sharp left to join Aldershot, but City signed Joe Riley from Bristol Rovers as their new regular inside right; Morgan returned to the team at right half, making 14 appearances. In 1934–35 Morgan started as the right half making 29 appearances scoring 1 goal and played in the FA Cup run to the 5th round when City's biggest ever home crowd to date of 43,335 packed into Ashton Gate to watch a 0–0 draw with Preston North End. Morgan was a regular in the half back line of Morgan, Jim Pearce and Ernie Brinton making 35 appearances without scoring in 1935–36. The same regular half-back line played in the next season, 1936–37, with Morgan making 32 appearances, scoring 1 goal. Morgan, an expert dead-ball kicker, made 41 appearances, scoring 2 goals, as Bristol City finished runners-up in Third Division South in 1937–38 being pipped for promotion by one point by Millwall. Morgan earned a first benefit match, jointly with Cyril Bridge, on 16 April 1938 when City beat Torquay United 2–0 in the League. Morgan made 19 appearances in 1938–39 sharing the right half duties with Bob Caldwell. Morgan made a further 3 appearances in the truncated 1939–40 season. In war time competitions Cliff Morgan made 203 appearances scoring 15 goals for Bristol City. When league football restarted after the Second World War Morgan resumed his career with 32 appearances scoring 2 goals as Bristol City finished in 3rd place in the Third Division South. Cliff Morgan was awarded a second benefit match on 12 October 1946 v Bournemouth when Morgan himself scored the only goal of the game. In 1947–48 Morgan made 19 appearances and was appointed player-coach in April 1948. He made 15 appearances scoring 2 goals in his final season 1948–49.

After retiring as a player Cliff Morgan became chief scout at Ashton Gate and was the recipient of a third benefit match on 5 May 1975 when Bristol City lost 2–4 to Leicester City in a friendly match. By this time Morgan was very ill and died two months later at Frenchay Hospital, Bristol aged 61. In all Morgan played in 537 first team matches scoring 36 goals for Bristol City including war time games, cup ties and friendlies. Cliff Morgan holds the record as the longest serving player with 45 years service in various capacities at the club.

== Honours ==
with Bristol City

- Football League Third Division South runners up: 1937–38
