= Harry Egan =

English footballer

Personal information
- Full name: Henry Egan
- Date of birth: 23 February 1912
- Place of birth: Tibshelf, England
- Date of death: 1979 (aged 66–67)
- Height: 5 ft 9 in (1.75 m)
- Position: Forward

Senior career*
Years	Team	Apps	(Gls)
- Sutton Town
1933–1936	Brighton & Hove Albion		
1936–1937	Southend United		
1937–1938	Aldershot		
1938–1939	Cardiff City	17	(9)
- * Club domestic league appearances and goals

Henry Egan (23 February 1912 — 1979) was an English professional footballer who played as a forward.

== Career ==
Egan began his career with Sutton Town before joining Football League side Brighton & Hove Albion. Unable to establish himself in the first team, he moved on to Southend United for a brief spell. He joined Aldershot in 1937, finishing as the club's top scorer for the 1937–38 season.

The following season, he played against Cardiff City where his performance prompted Cardiff manager Billy Jennings to sign him for a fee of £1,500. He scored on his debut for the club, during a 1–1 draw with Exeter City, and scored a further eight league goals before his professional career was brought to an end by the outbreak of World War II.

== Personal life ==
Egan's father William Egan was also a professional footballer and won a single cap for Wales in 1892. His brother Doug also played in the Football League for Derby County and Aldershot.
