= Jack Hick =

English footballer

Personal information
- Date of birth: 1912
- Place of birth: Birmingham, England
- Height: 5 ft 11 in (1.80 m)
- Positions: Full back; left half

Senior career*
Years	Team	Apps	(Gls)
19??–1934	Birmingham	0	(0)
1934–1939	Bristol City	84	(0)
1939	Ipswich Town	2	(0)
- * Club domestic league appearances and goals

John B. Hick (1912 – after 1938) was an English footballer who played as a full back and left half. He made over 80 Football League appearances in the years before the Second World War.

== Career ==
Hick was signed by Bristol City from Birmingham in August 1934, and made 84 League appearances for the club over five seasons. Hick moved to Ipswich Town in the summer of 1939, and played twice before the 1939–40 Football League season was abandoned on the outbreak of war.
