= Arthur Rhodes (footballer) =

English footballer

Personal information
- Full name: Arthur Rhodes
- Place of birth: Devon, England
- Position: Forward

Senior career*
Years	Team	Apps	(Gls)
1936–1937	Stockport County	0	(0)
1937–1938	Bournemouth and Boscombe Athletic	8	(3)
1938	Torquay United		
1938–1939	Cardiff City	5	(0)
- * Club domestic league appearances and goals

Arthur Rhodes was an English professional footballer who played as a forward. He played in the Football League for Bournemouth and Boscombe Athletic, Torquay United and Cardiff City. He appeared as a guest player for Leeds United during World War II.
