= Charlie Hill (footballer) =

Welsh footballer

Personal information
- Full name: Charles John Hill
- Date of birth: 6 September 1918
- Place of birth: Cardiff, Wales
- Date of death: 22 December 1998 (aged 80)
- Place of death: Cardiff, Wales
- Position: Inside forward

Senior career*
Years	Team	Apps	(Gls)
1938–1947	Cardiff City	19	(3)
1947–1949	Torquay United	63	(15)
1949–1950	Queens Park Rangers	21	(1)
1950–1951	Swindon Town	4	(0)
1951–1952	Barry Town	14	(2)
- * Club domestic league appearances and goals

Charles John Hill (6 September 1918 — 22 December 1998), also known as Midge Hill, was a Welsh professional footballer who played as an inside forward.

== Career ==
Born in Cardiff, Hill began his career with his hometown club Cardiff City in 1938 after playing amateur level for his local club Bridgend Street of Splott Cardiff . However, the outbreak of World War II interrupted his early career but he returned to play for Cardiff after the war. He struggled to maintain a place in the first team as the side won promotion from the Third Division South and was allowed to join Torquay United in 1947.

He went on to make 63 league appearances for Torquay before joining Queens Park Rangers in 1950. He later had spells with Swindon Town and Barry Town.
