= James H. Prescott =

American politician

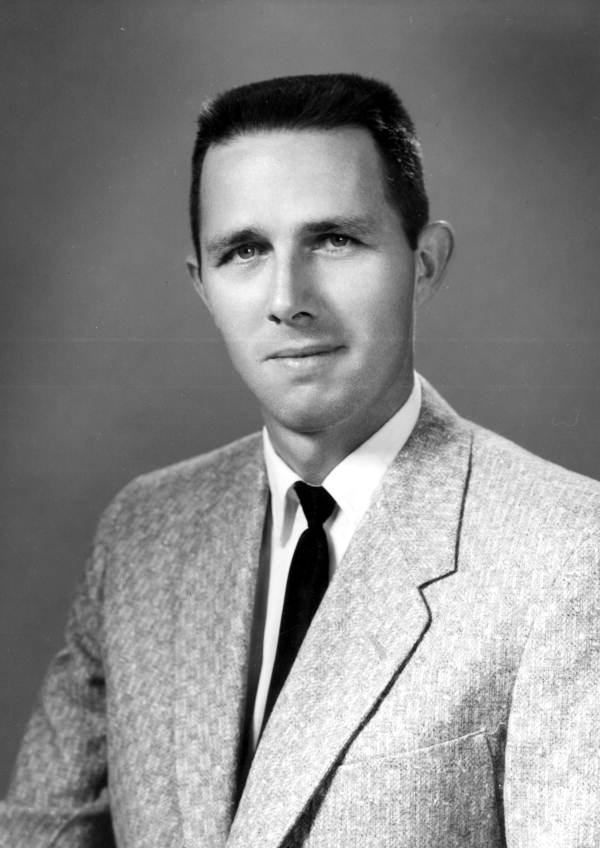
- Prescott in 1963

Member of the Florida House of Representatives from Walton County
- In office 1962–1964

Personal details
- Born: October 19, 1934 DeFuniak Springs, Florida, U.S.
- Died: December 28, 2005 (aged 71)
- Party: Democratic
- Spouse: Barbara Prescott
- Children: 3
- Education: Florida State University

James H. Prescott (October 19, 1934 – December 28, 2005) was an American politician. He served as a Democratic member of the Florida House of Representatives.

== Life and career ==
Prescott was born in DeFuniak Springs, Florida, the son of Lola and Henry Lee Prescott. He attended Florida State University, graduating in 1960.

In 1962, Prescott was elected to the Florida House of Representatives and served until 1964.

He was also a member of the Florida National Guard.

Prescott died December 28, 2005, at his home while sleeping, at the age of 71, after a long illness. He was survived by his wife Mary Sue Cawthon Prescott and three children.
