= Eric Barraclough =

English cricketer (1923–1999)

Eric Scott Barraclough (30 March 1923 – 21 May 1999) was an English first-class cricketer, who played two matches for Yorkshire from 1949 to 1950. He was a right-handed batsman and right arm fast-medium bowler, who scored 43 runs at 21.50, and took four wickets at 34, with a best of 2 for 39. Barraclough was born in Great Horton, Bradford, Yorkshire, England, and played for the Yorkshire Second IX in the Minor Counties championship from 1946 to 1950.

He made his debut for the senior Yorkshire team against the Minor Counties at Lord's in June 1949, scoring three and a career best 24 not out batting at number seven in the order, and opened the bowling with a young Fred Trueman, taking 1 for 18 in his first bowl in first-class cricket, in a match Yorkshire won by 136 runs. His only County Championship appearance came the following year against Northamptonshire, where he took three wickets in a drawn game. Despite having performed creditably in the second team in 37 matches over five years, he was not given a further opportunity to impress in first-class cricket.

He died aged 76, in May 1999, in Bradford.
