= Harry Clifton (footballer, born 1914) =

English footballer

Personal information
- Full name: Henry Clifton
- Date of birth: 28 May 1914
- Place of birth: Marley Hill, England
- Date of death: 1998 (aged 83–84)
- Height: 5 ft 7 1/2 in (1.71 m)
- Position: Inside forward

Senior career*
Years	Team	Apps	(Gls)
1931–1932	Lintz Colliery		
1932	West Bromwich Albion	0	(0)
1932	Annfield Plain		
1932–1933	Scotswood		
1933–1938	Chesterfield	121	(67)
1938–1946	Newcastle United	29	(15)
1946–1949	Grimsby Town	69	(23)
1949–1951	Goole Town		
1951–195?	Sutton Town		
- * Club domestic league appearances and goals

Henry Clifton (28 May 1914 – 1998) was an English professional footballer who played as an inside forward.
