= Arthur Barraclough =

English footballer

Personal information
- Full name: Arthur Barraclough
- Date of birth: 7 November 1916
- Place of birth: Moorthorpe, England
- Date of death: 2005 (aged 88–89)
- Place of death: Pontefract, England
- Height: 5 ft 6 1/2 in (1.69 m)
- Position: Outside left

Senior career*
Years	Team	Apps	(Gls)
–1936	Peterborough United	25	(5)
1936	Chelsea	0	(0)
1938–1939	Swindon Town	21	(6)
1939–1940	Clapton Orient		
1940	Notts County		
1940–1943	Doncaster Rovers		
- * Club domestic league appearances and goals

Arthur Barraclough (7 November 1916 – 2005) was an English professional footballer who played in the Football League for Swindon Town as an outside left.

== Career statistics ==
Appearances and goals by club, season and competition
Club	Season	League			FA Cup		Other		Total	
Club	Season	Division	Apps	Goals	Apps	Goals	Apps	Goals	Apps	Goals
Peterborough United	1934–35	Midland League	1	0	―		―		1	0
Peterborough United	1935–36	Midland League	24	5	1	0	1 (Note: Appearance in Northamptonshire Senior Cup)	1	26	6
Peterborough United	Total		25	5	1	0	1	1	27	6
Swindon Town	1938–39	Third Division South	21	6	1	0	―		22	6
Career total			46	11	1	0	1	1	48	12
