= Jimmy Collins (footballer, born 1911) =

English footballer

Personal information
- Full name: James Henry Collins
- Date of birth: 13 January 1911
- Place of birth: Bermondsey, England
- Date of death: 1983 (aged 71–72)
- Position: Forward

Senior career*
Years	Team	Apps	(Gls)
1929–1931	Tooting		
1931–1933	Queens Park Rangers	22	(4)
1933	Tunbridge Wells Rangers		
1933–1934	Rochdale		
1934–1935	Stockport County	6	(1)
1935–1936	Walsall		
1936–1937	Liverpool	7	(0)
1937–1939	Cardiff City	76	(41)
- * Club domestic league appearances and goals

James Henry Collins (30 January 1911 – 1983) was an English footballer who played as a striker for a number of Football League clubs. His most successful spell was with Cardiff City, finishing as the club's top scorer for two consecutive seasons.

== Career ==
Collins began his career playing non-league football for Tooting and impressed enough for Queens Park Rangers to sign him in 1931. However, he struggled to make an impact in the Football League and returned to non-league football with Tunbridge Wells Rangers. His goalscoring exploits for Tunbridge saw him offered a second chance at professional football by Rochdale in 1933, later playing for Stockport County and Walsall.

In January 1936, having scored 14 league goals during the first half of the season for Walsall, Collins was signed by Liverpool. He made his debut for the Reds in a 6–1 defeat to West Bromwich Albion and appeared in a further five matches in the following month. However, the following season, Collins found himself out of favour and was forced to wait a year for his next, and final appearance, for the club, playing in a 1–1 draw with Preston North End on 13 March 1937 in place of Fred Howe. He was allowed to leave the club soon after, in May 1937, joining Football League Third Division South side Cardiff City for a fee of £1,500, scoring the Bluebirds goal in a 1–1 draw with Clapton Orient on his debut and a hat-trick in his home debut in the following match, a 5–2 victory over Torquay United.

His prolific form saw him finish as the club's top scorer in two consecutive seasons, between 1937 and 1939, forming an effective partnership with Bert Turner in his first season, and he continued in the same form during the abandoned 1939–40 season, scoring four goals in the three league matches that were completed prior to the suspension of the Football League following the outbreak of the Second World War. During the war, Collins appeared as a guest player for Swindon Town and Aberaman Athletic.
