= Ossie Parry =

Welsh footballer

Personal information
- Full name: Oswald Parry
- Date of birth: 16 August 1908
- Place of birth: Dowlais, Wales
- Date of death: 1991 (aged 82–83)
- Position: Defender

Senior career*
Years	Team	Apps	(Gls)
1930–1931	Wimbledon		
1931–1936	Crystal Palace	142	(0)
1936–1950	Ipswich Town	104	(0)
- → Chelmsford City (guest)
- * Club domestic league appearances and goals

Oswald Parry (16 August 1908 – 1991) was a Welsh professional footballer. During his career he made over 100 appearances for Ipswich Town and 150 appearances (142 league matches) for Crystal Palace.
