= Jimmy Cookson =

English footballer

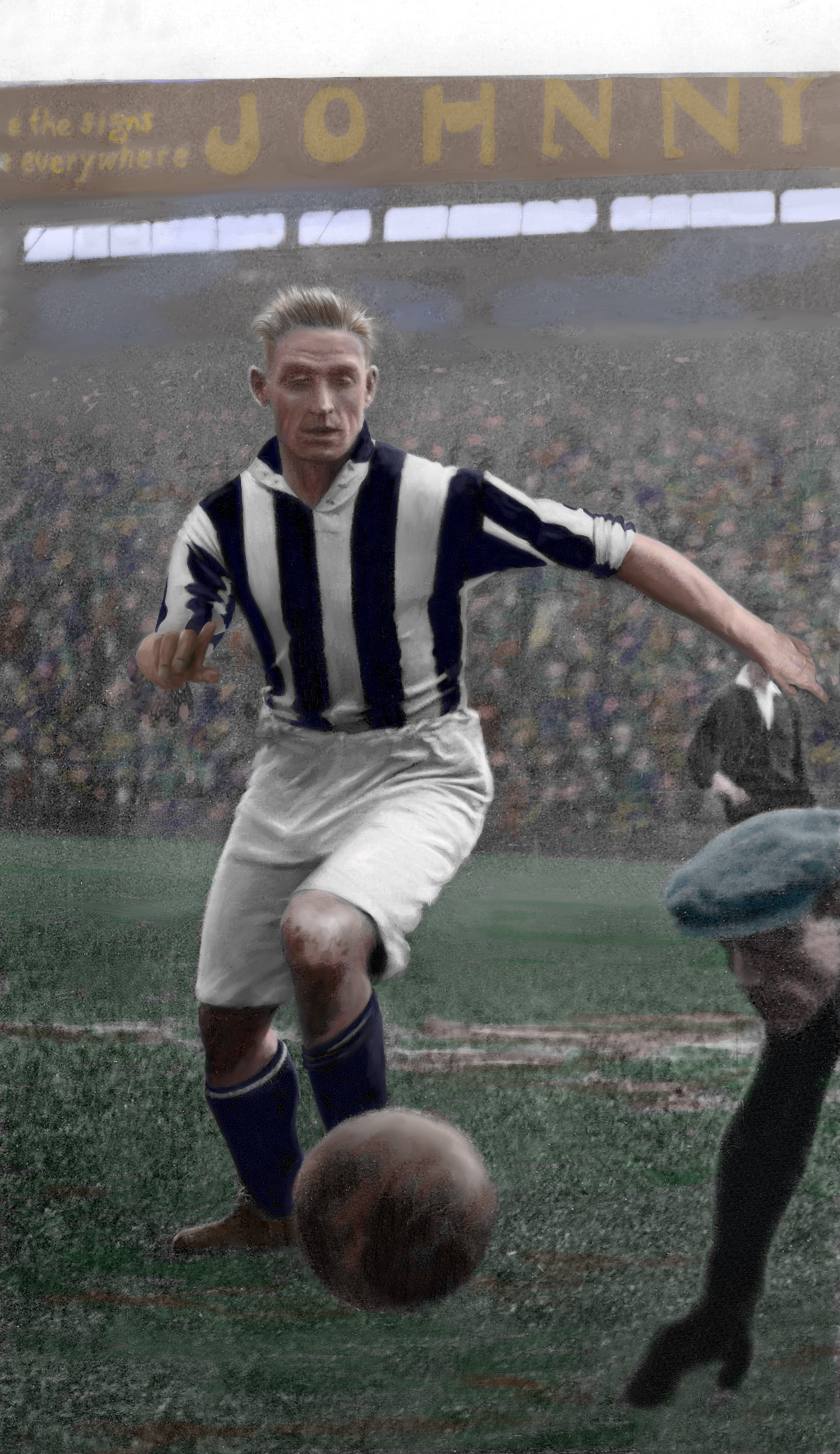

Personal information
- Full name: James Cookson
- Date of birth: 6 December 1904
- Place of birth: Manchester, England
- Date of death: 14 December 1970 (aged 66)
- Place of death: Warminster, England
- Height: 5 ft 9 1/2 in (1.77 m)
- Position: Centre forward

Senior career*
| Years | Team | Apps | (Gls) |
| 1923–1925 | Manchester City | 0 | (0) |
| 1925–1927 | Chesterfield | 74 | (85) |
| 1927–1933 | West Bromwich Albion | 122 | (103) |
| 1933–1936 | Plymouth Argyle | 46 | (37) |
| 1936–1938 | Swindon Town | 50 | (31) |
| Total | | 292 | (256) |
- * Club domestic league appearances and goals

James Cookson (6 December 1904 – 14 December 1970) was an English footballer who played as a centre forward in the Football League for Manchester City, Chesterfield, West Bromwich Albion, Plymouth Argyle and Swindon Town.

== Life and career ==
Cookson was born in Manchester. He began his career as a wing half with South Salford Lad's Club and then played for Clayton and Manchester North End. He turned professional with Manchester City in August 1923, but was unable to break into the first team and was sent to Southport on loan for a trial period in 1924. He was transferred to Chesterfield in April 1925, and converted to a centre forward. He was the leading goalscorer in the Third Division North for the 1925–26 season with 44 goals, and scored 85 overall in 74 league appearances. In August 1927, he joined West Bromwich Albion for a £2,500 fee. He continued to score goals at his new club and was a member of the 1930–31 squad that won the FA Cup and promotion to the First Division. Later in 1931, Cookson was selected for the Football Association tour of Canada.

He scored 103 league goals in 122 matches for Albion, including six in a Second Division game against Blackpool in 1927. Cookson was also the leading goalscorer in the Second Division for the 1927–28 season with 38 goals. Cookson maintained his high goalscoring ratio after joining Second Division club Plymouth Argyle in 1933. He scored 28 goals in his first season with Argyle, including 27 in 29 league appearances, but injuries restricted his playing time over the next two campaigns. Cookson managed a further 10 goals in 17 matches to bring his overall tally to 38 goals in 48 games. He moved to Swindon Town in 1936, where he played on for two more seasons, and scored 31 goals in 50 league appearances. Cookson retired from the game in May 1938 to become a publican.

Cookson's Football League record of 256 goals scored in 292 appearances is one of the best in the League's history. His great quality was a willingness to shoot, and shoot early, whenever a chance presented itself. Cookson died in Warminster on 14 December 1970.
