= Jack Eslor =

Scottish footballer

Personal information
- Full name: John Eslor
- Date of birth: Edinburgh, Scotland
- Position: Full back

Senior career*
| Years | Team | Apps | (Gls) |
| 1935–1936 | Hearts | 0 | (0) |
| 1936–1937 | Cardiff City | 3 | (0) |
| 1937–1939 | Workington | | |
- * Club domestic league appearances and goals

John Eslor was a Scottish professional footballer who played as a defender.

== Career ==
Born in Edinburgh, Eslor began his career with Hearts. After appearing in several friendlies, he made his competitive debut for the club in the semi-final of the East of Scotland Shield against Leith Athletic. He kept his place in the side for the final, helping Hearts to a 3–1 victory over St Bernard's.

His performances attracted the attention of Cardiff City and he joined the club the following season. He made his debut in a 0–0 draw with Gillingham, but struggled to establish himself in the first team and made just two further league appearances. He was released at the end of the season and finished his professional career with Workington.

== Honours ==
Hearts

- East of Scotland Shield winner: 1936
