= Tom Mooney (footballer) =

Scottish footballer

Personal information
- Date of birth: 31 October 1910
- Place of birth: Glasgow, Scotland
- Date of death: 15 December 1981 (aged 71)
- Position: Outside left

Senior career*
Years	Team	Apps	(Gls)
–	Royal Albert Athletic		
1932–1936	Airdrieonians	154	(44)
1936–1944	Newcastle United	75	(17)
1944–?	Greenock Morton		

International career
1933–1935	Scottish League XI	2	(0)
- * Club domestic league appearances and goals

Thomas Mooney (31 October 1910 – 15 December 1981) was a Scottish footballer, who played for Airdrieonians, Newcastle United and Greenock Morton. He also represented the Scottish League.
