= Fabio Barraclough =

Eduardo Joel Fabio Barraclough Valls (1923 – 6 January 2019) was a Spanish-born academic noted for his connection to police in apartheid South Africa.

== Career ==
Barraclough was born in Madrid in 1923, to a Spanish mother and Yorkshire father who founded Madrid's Chamber of Commerce. He moved to London with his family in the 1930s as a refugee from Francoist Spain. He taught fine art and sculpture at Rugby School, where colleagues considered him "highly entertaining, a most unorthodox and highly gifted" teacher. He established himself during the 1960s and early 1970s as an authority on sculpture, publishing in academic journals and becoming a member of the Royal British Society of Sculptors. In 1974, Barraclough was appointed to a three-year contract as professor of fine arts at the University of the Witwatersrand. some colleagues there did not think well of his work, and he was transferred to a job at an associated gallery.

In 2000, it was revealed that Barraclough, while outwardly living the life of anti-apartheid activist since the 1970s, had been a paid informant of the South African state security police. The media was used to promote his image as a "brilliant, liberal artist with apparently impeccable credentials" in order to gain public trust, while he was funneling money from anti-apartheid groups to the police. He died on 6 January 2019.
