= Jim Barraclough =

England international rugby league footballer (1923 –2002)

Personal information
- Full name: James Barraclough
- Born: 26 November 1923 Featherstone, England
- Died: 25 November 2002 (aged 79) Hull, England

Playing information
- Height: 5 ft 10 in (1.78 m)
- Position: Second-row
Club
Years	Team	Pld	T	G	FG	P
≤1950–≥50	Hull Kingston Rovers	160	31	0	0	93
1954–56/57	Featherstone Rovers	53	4	0	0	12
	Total	213	35	0	0	105
Representative
Years	Team	Pld	T	G	FG	P
1950	England	1	0	0	0	0

James Barraclough (26 November 1923 – 25 November 2002) was an English professional rugby league footballer who played in the 1940s and 1950s. He represented England at the international level and played at club level for Hull Kingston Rovers and Featherstone Rovers, primarily as a second-row.

== Background ==
Jim Barraclough was born in Featherstone, West Riding of Yorkshire, England, and he died at the age of 79 in Hull, East Riding of Yorkshire, England.

== Playing career ==
=== Club career ===
Barraclough made his début for Featherstone Rovers on Saturday 4 December 1954.

=== International honours ===
Barraclough won a cap for England while at Hull Kingston Rovers in 1950 against Wales.
