= Henry Barraclough =

Australian mechanical engineer (1871–1958)

Sir Henry Barraclough KBE VD
- Barraclough in 1935
- Born: Samuel Henry Egerton Barraclough; 25 October 1871
- Died: 30 August 1958 (aged 86)
- Occupation: Mechanical engineer

Sir Samuel Henry Egerton Barraclough KBE VD (25 October 1871 – 30 August 1958) was an Australian mechanical engineer.

He was appointed CBE (military division) in 1919 having served in the Great War, and a year later was appointed to the civil division as a KBE. He was Professor of Mechanical Engineering at the University of Sydney, 1915–1942 and President of the Australian Institution of Engineers (1935–36).
