= Arthur Sharp =

English footballer

Personal information
- Full name: Arthur Allan Sharp
- Date of birth: 9 July 1905
- Place of birth: Nottingham, England
- Date of death: 1991
- Position: Inside forward

Senior career*
Years	Team	Apps	(Gls)
- Nottingham St Mark's
–	Loughborough Corinthians		
–	Mansfield Town		
1927–19??	Blackpool	0	(0)
1928	Reading	0	(0)
1928–19??	West Ham United	0	(0)
–	Newark Town		
1930–1932	Carlisle United	69	(15)
1932–1933	Bristol City	28	(9)
1933–1934	Aldershot	34	(3)
1934–193?	Oldham Athletic	1	(0)
193?–1936	Shrewsbury Town		
1936–1937	Darlington	8	(0)
–	Shrewsbury Town		
–	Scarborough		
- * Club domestic league appearances and goals

Arthur Allan Sharp (9 July 1905 – 1991) was an English footballer who played as an inside forward in the Football League for Carlisle United, Bristol City, Aldershot, Oldham Athletic and Darlington. He was also on the books of Blackpool, Reading and West Ham United without representing them in the League, and played non-league football for Nottingham St Mark's, Loughborough Corinthians, Mansfield Town, Newark Town, Shrewsbury Town and Scarborough.
