= Bill Owen (footballer) =

Welsh footballer

Billy Owen
Personal information
- Full name: William E. Owen
- Date of birth: 17 September 1906
- Place of birth: Northwich, Cheshire
- Date of death: 1981
- Height: 5 ft 11 in (1.80 m)
- Position: Outside left

Senior career*
Years	Team	Apps	(Gls)
- Northwich Victoria
1932–1934	Macclesfield	52	(15)
1934–1936	Manchester city	17	(1)
1936	Reading	23	(2)
1936–1937	Exeter City	24	(6)
1937–1947	Newport County	39	(2)
1941–1944	→ Mansfield Town (wartime)	7	(5)
- * Club domestic league appearances and goals

William Owen (30 June 1914 – 26 March 1976) was a Welsh footballer who played as an outside left.

He began his career with non-league sides Northwich Victoria and Macclesfield before making the step up to the Football League with Manchester United in May 1934. He made his debut on 22 September 1934, starting at outside left in place of Tom Manley; Owen scored the opening goal in a 5–0 win, beginning a run of six consecutive appearances, all of which United won by an aggregate score of 18–3. He made nine more appearances that season, as well as another two at the start of the 1935–36 season, but never scored again for the club before leaving for Reading in January 1936. He lasted less than a calendar year at Reading, but made 23 appearances for the Third Division South side before joining Exeter City in December 1936.

Exeter went on a long run in the 1936–37 FA Cup; by the time Owen joined, they had already beaten Folkestone and Walthamstow Avenue to reach the third round, before beating Third Division North side Oldham Athletic and Second Division Leicester City. In the fifth round, they came up against First Division side Preston North End; Owen scored Exeter's first and third goals as they took a 3–2 lead into the final 20 minutes, but Preston scored three times to win 5–3, and went on to lose to Sunderland in the final. At the end of the season, Owen moved to Newport County, where he spent the remainder of his career; he made appearances for the club both before and after the Second World War, during which he also guested for Mansfield Town between 1941 and 1944. At the end of the 1946–47 season, he was appointed as Newport County's trainer, a position he held until the end of the 1948–49 season. He died in Newport on 26 March 1981.
