= Eddie Jones (footballer, born 1914) =

Welsh footballer

Personal information
- Full name: Edwin Morris Jones
- Date of birth: 20 April 1914
- Place of birth: Abercynon, Wales
- Date of death: 1984 (aged 69–70)
- Height: 5 ft 7 in (1.70 m)
- Position: Winger

Senior career*
Years	Team	Apps	(Gls)
- Abercynon
1933	Bolton Wanderers	1	(1)
1936–1946	Swindon Town	126	(17)
–	Chippenham Town		

International career
- Wales Schools
- * Club domestic league appearances and goals

Edwin Morris Jones (born 20 April 1914 in Abercynon, Wales) was a footballer who played in the English Football League for Bolton Wanderers and Swindon Town. He also played for Chippenham Town.
