= Bill Main (footballer) =

Scottish footballer (1915–1969)

Personal information
- Full name: William Gay Main
- Date of birth: 30 November 1915
- Place of birth: St Monans, Scotland
- Date of death: 18 May 1969 (aged 53)
- Place of death: Dunfermline, Scotland
- Height: 5 ft 11 in (1.80 m)
- Position: Wing half

Youth career
- 1934–1935: St Monans Juniors

Senior career*
Years	Team	Apps	(Gls)
1935–1936	Raith Rovers		
1936–1939	Cardiff City	6	(0)
1939	Colchester United	0	(0)
- * Club domestic league appearances and goals

William Gay Main (30 November 1915 – 18 May 1969) was a Scottish professional footballer who played as a wing half. He made six appearances in the Football League for Cardiff City.

== Career ==
Main began his senior career with Raith Rovers. In December 1936, he joined Football League Third Division South side Cardiff City and made his debut on Christmas Day of the same year in a defeat to Torquay United. He struggled to establish himself in the first team, making five further league appearances in the following two seasons. He left Cardiff to join Colchester United in 1939 and played in the club's opening three fixtures of the 1939–40 season before the league was suspended following the outbreak of World War II.
