= Davie Ovenstone =

Scottish footballer

Personal information
- Full name: David Guthrie Ovenstone
- Date of birth: 17 June 1913
- Place of birth: St Monans, Scotland
- Date of death: 1983 (aged 69–70)
- Height: 5 ft 8 1/2 in (1.74 m)
- Position: Outside forward

Youth career
- St Monans Swifts
- Rosslyn Juniors

Senior career*
Years	Team	Apps	(Gls)
1932–1935	Raith Rovers	86	(14)
1935	Bristol Rovers	0	(0)
1935–1936	Queens Park Rangers	15	(3)
1936–1937	Cardiff City	21	(4)
1937	Watford		
1937–1938	Southport	8	(3)
1938–1939	Barry Town	38	(0)
- * Club domestic league appearances and goals

David Guthrie Ovenstone (17 June 1913 — 1983) was a Scottish professional footballer who played as an outside forward. He played for several clubs in the Football League during his career.
