= George Walton (footballer) =

English footballer

Personal information
- Date of birth: 1911
- Place of birth: Burnley, England
- Height: 5 ft 7 in (1.70 m)
- Position: Forward

Senior career*
Years	Team	Apps	(Gls)
1929–1932	Accrington Stanley	79	(21)
1932–1936	Bolton Wanderers	26	(1)
1936–1939	Cardiff City	84	(16)
1939	Walsall	0	(0)
- * Club domestic league appearances and goals

George Walton (born 1911; date of death unknown) was an English professional footballer. During his career, he made over 150 appearances in the English Football League during spells with Accrington Stanley, Bolton Wanderers and Cardiff City.

== Career ==
Born in Burnley, Walton began his professional career with Accrington Stanley in the Third Division North in 1929. During the 1932–33 season, he joined First Division side Bolton Wanderers for a fee of £300 but struggled to establish himself in the first-team at Burnden Park, despite being a consistent scorer for the club's reserve side in the Central League. Having made just 26 league appearances in nearly four seasons with the club, he was allowed to join Third Division South side Cardiff City, following former Bolton teammate George Nicholson who had made the same move one month before. The Bluebirds struggled in the bottom half of the table for the majority of his time there and, despite arriving three months into the season, he finished as the club's top scorer during his first season at Ninian Park. He left the club in 1939 to join Walsall, making three appearances at the start of the 1939–40 season before the Football League was suspended following the outbreak of World War II.
