= Les Talbot =

English football player and manager (1910–1983)

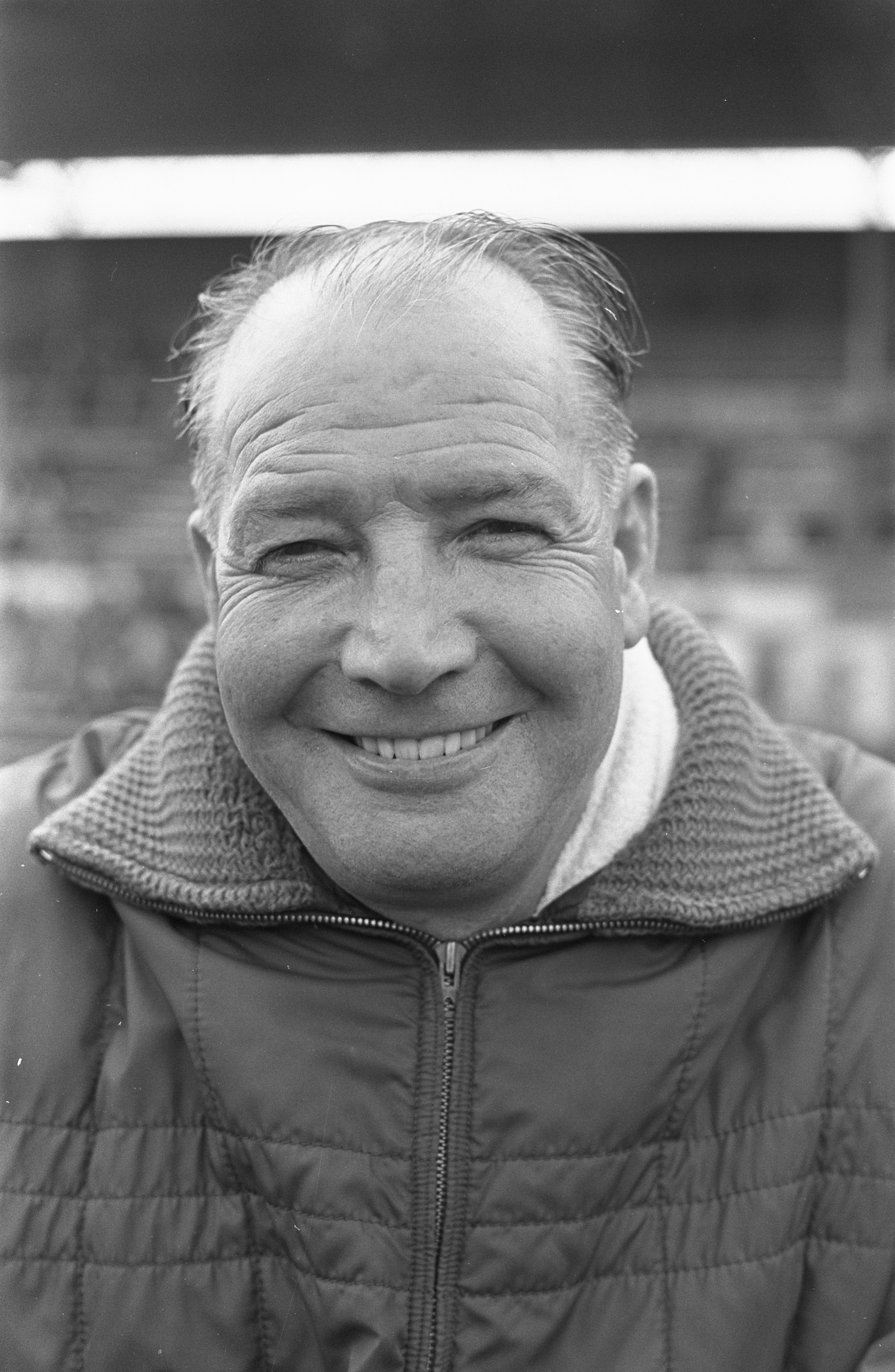
- Talbot in 1968

Personal information
- Full name: Frank Leslie Talbot
- Date of birth: 3 August 1910
- Place of birth: Hednesford, England
- Date of death: 5 December 1983 (aged 73)
- Place of death: Alkmaar, Netherlands
- Height: 5 ft 11 in (1.80 m)
- Position: Inside forward

Senior career*
Years	Team	Apps	(Gls)
?–1930	Hednesford Town		
1930–1936	Blackburn Rovers	90	(20)
1936–1939	Cardiff City	94	(21)
1939–1947	Walsall	18	(4)

Managerial career
- 1947–1960: RC Heemstede
- 1960–1961: Zandvoortmeeuwen
- 1961–1962: Be Quick 1887
- 1962–1966: DWS
- 1966–1967: Heracles Almelo
- 1967–1968: AZ Alkmaar
- 1968–1969: DWS
- 1970: RC Heemstede (interim)
- 1970–1972: EVV Eindhoven
- * Club domestic league appearances and goals

Frank Leslie Talbot (3 August 1910 – 5 December 1983) was an English professional football player and manager who played as an Inside forward.

== Career ==
Born in Hednesford, Staffordshire, Talbot began his career playing non-league football for his hometown side Hednesford Town before signing for Blackburn Rovers in 1930. Several years later he secured a first team place in the side, but was sold to Cardiff City in 1936 as part of a two player deal which saw Albert Pinxton also travel to Ninian Park. At the time of his signing the club had been in decline over the five previous seasons, but Talbot was part of the side that managed to improve the club's fortunes. In 1939 he was sold to Walsall, but the outbreak of World War II meant he only played one season for the club, the 1946–47 season, before retiring. During the war he also guested for Bath City. Following his retirement he remained active in football as a coach, including working in the Netherlands from 1947 to the early 1970s. In 1953 and 1964 he became with respectively Racing Club Heemstede (RCH) and DWS champion of the Netherlands.

== Death ==
Talbot died in December 1983 at a hospital in Alkmaar, Netherlands.
