= Bob Jones (footballer, born 1902) =

English footballer

Personal information
- Full name: Robert H. Jones
- Date of birth: 9 January 1902
- Place of birth: Everton, England
- Date of death: January 1989 (aged 86–87)
- Position: Goalkeeper

Senior career*
| Years | Team | Apps | (Gls) |
| 1924–1926 | Everton | 3 | (0) |
| 1926–1929 | Southport | 16 | (0) |
| 1929–1937 | Bolton Wanderers | | |
| 1937–1939 | Cardiff City | 58 | (0) |
| 1939–1950 | Southport | 0 | (0) |
- * Club domestic league appearances and goals

Robert H. Jones (9 January 1902 – 1989) was an English professional footballer who played as a goalkeeper. He began his career with Everton, where he made his professional debut, and Southport but was unable to establish himself in either side.

He joined Bolton Wanderers in 1929, replacing Dick Pym as first choice goalkeeper before going on to make over 200 appearances in all competitions for the club. He joined Cardiff City in 1937 where he finished his playing career before working as a trainer with Southport.

== Career ==
Born in Everton, Jones began his career as an apprentice with his hometown club, becoming close friends with Dixie Dean. He had written to the club to request a trial while playing as a left half but, when the goalkeeper for the session failed to arrive, he was put in goal and impressed enough to be given a contract. He made his professional debut on 8 November 1924 in a 2–2 draw with Manchester City. However, he was unable to establish himself in the first team, making two further appearances, before leaving to join Third Division North side Southport in 1926. He made his debut for Southport on 13 September 1926 in a 5–1 defeat to Chesterfield but made just two further appearances during the 1926–27 season. Over the following three seasons, he remained a backup goalkeeper, making 13 appearances before leaving the club in 1929.

He joined Bolton Wanderers soon after, being signed as cover for long serving goalkeeper Dick Pym. With Pym approaching the end of his career, Jones replaced him in the side for the majority of the 1930–31 season and established himself as the club's first choice goalkeeper. He went on to make over 200 appearances in all competitions for the club before he was replaced by Stan Hanson.

In July 1937, he joined Third Division South side Cardiff City on a free transfer. In his first season, he was ever present for the club, appearing in all 49 competitive matches Cardiff played. However, the following season, he was displaced by Bill Fielding and left the club at the end of the season to rejoin Southport. He returned to Southport in 1939 after being persuaded by a club official to keep playing; Jones was planning on buying a pub to manage. However, the outbreak of World War II brought an end to his professional playing career and, after representing the club in wartime fixtures, he was appointed as a trainer in 1947.

He continued to feature for Southport's reserve side until 1950, becoming the oldest player to represent the club at any level at the age of 48. He retired after eleven years as the club's trainer.

== Personal life ==
His son Bobby Jones later progressed through the youth system at Southport under his father's guidance to become a professional footballer. After retiring, Jones went to live with his son before his death in 1989 from pneumonia.
