= Ben Morton (footballer) =

English footballer

Personal information
- Full name: Benjamin W. Morton
- Date of birth: 28 August 1910
- Place of birth: Sheffield, England
- Date of death: November 1962 (aged 52)
- Height: 5 ft 10 in (1.78 m)
- Position: Forward

Senior career*
Years	Team	Apps	(Gls)
- Stourbridge
1933–193?	Wolverhampton Wanderers		
193?–1935	Stourbridge		
1935–1936	Manchester United	1	(0)
1936–1937	Torquay United		
1937–1945	Swindon Town		
- Stourbridge
- * Club domestic league appearances and goals

Benjamin W. Morton (28 August 1910 – November 1962) was an English professional footballer who played as a forward.

Born in Sheffield, Morton began his career with Stourbridge before joining Wolverhampton Wanderers in February 1933. He then joined Manchester United via a short spell back at Stourbridge in May 1935. His only game for United came against West Ham United on 16 November 1935, and he left to join Torquay United in May 1936.

In October 1937, he was transferred to Swindon Town for a then-club record fee of £1,000, and during the following season (1938–39) he was the top scorer of the Third Division South with 28 goals.

He was a regular in the Swindon side until the outbreak of war and remained with the club. He played once during the 1945–46 season before leaving in 1945 to rejoin Stourbridge.
