= Albert Pinxton =

English footballer

Personal information
- Full name: Albert Edward Pinxton
- Date of birth: 24 May 1912
- Place of birth: Hanley, Staffordshire, England
- Date of death: 1992 (aged 79–80)
- Height: 5 ft 9 1/2 in (1.77 m)
- Position: Inside forward

Senior career*
Years	Team	Apps	(Gls)
1931–1932	Stoke City	0	(0)
1932	Stoke St Peter's		
1932–1935	Nantwich Town		(20)
1935–1936	Blackburn Rovers	3	(0)
1936–1937	Cardiff City	20	(3)
1937–1938	Torquay United	4	(0)
Total		27	(3)
- * Club domestic league appearances and goals

Albert Edward Pinxton (24 May 1912 – 1992) was a footballer who played in the Football League for Blackburn Rovers, Cardiff City and Torquay United.

== Career statistics ==
Club	Season	League			FA Cup		Other		Total	
Club	Season	Division	Apps	Goals	Apps	Goals	Apps	Goals	Apps	Goals
Stoke City	1931–32	First Division	0	0	0	0	0	0	0	0
Blackburn Rovers	1935–36	First Division	3	0	1	0	0	0	4	0
Cardiff City	1936–37	Third Division South	20	3	2	0	1	0	23	3
Torquay United	1937–38	Third Division South	4	0	0	0	0	0	4	0
Career total			27	3	3	0	1	0	31	3
