= Eugene Melaniphy =

Irish footballer

Personal information
- Date of birth: 5 February 1912
- Place of birth: Westport, Ireland
- Date of death: 3 June 1991 (aged 79)
- Height: 6 ft 0 in (1.83 m)
- Position: Forward

Senior career*
Years	Team	Apps	(Gls)
- Redhill
- Finchley
1931?–1936?	Plymouth Argyle	68	(33)
1936?–1938?	Cardiff City	20	(8)
- Worcester City
1939	Northampton Town	3	(1)
- * Club domestic league appearances and goals

Eugene "Ted" Michael Joseph Patrick Melaniphy (5 February 1912 – 3 June 1991) played as a footballer in the Football League in the 1930s. He was born in Westport, Ireland.

== Career ==
He made his debut for Plymouth Argyle in the 1931-32 season, and played his last game for them in 1935-36, playing a total of 68 Football League Second Division games for them, scoring 33 times. He scored a hat-trick for them on 7 October 1933.

He joined Cardiff City for the 1936-37 season and played 20 league matches for them, scoring 8 goals. After a short spell with Worcester City he joined Northampton Town for the 1939-40 season, but the season was abandoned due to the war after only a few games.
