= Lance Carr (soccer) =

South African soccer player

Personal information
- Full name: Lance Lanyon Carr
- Date of birth: 18 February 1910
- Place of birth: Johannesburg, South Africa
- Date of death: 1983
- Place of death: Greenwich, England
- Position: Outside left

Senior career*
Years	Team	Apps	(Gls)
- Johannesburg Calies
- Boksburg
1933–1936	Liverpool	31	(8)
1936	Newport County	25	(5)
- South Liverpool
1938–1945	Newport County	39	(9)
1946	Bristol Rovers	42	(8)
- Merthyr Tydfil
- Gloucester City
- * Club domestic league appearances and goals

Lance Lanyon Carr (18 February 1910 – 1983) was a South African former professional football player. He was born in Johannesburg. He played for Liverpool from September 1933 to October 1936 making a total of 31 appearances scoring eight times.

He also played for Aldershot, Newport County, Swindon Town, Bristol City, Bristol Rovers, Gloucester City and Merthyr Tydfil.

Whilst in Liverpool he played baseball in the summer in the nascent NBA leagues, playing for Avalons (1934) in the Liverpool League and then Hurst Hawks (1935) Blackpool Seagulls (1936) and Liverpool Giants (1937) in the North of England League.
