= Cliff Godfrey =

English footballer

Personal information
- Full name: Clifford Godfrey
- Date of birth: 17 February 1909
- Place of birth: Baildon, England
- Date of death: 1986 (aged 76–77)
- Height: 5 ft 11 1/2 in (1.82 m)
- Position: Defender

Senior career*
Years	Team	Apps	(Gls)
–1928	Guiseley		
1928–1935	Bradford Park Avenue	55	(1)
1935–1938	Cardiff City	104	(1)
1938–1939	Walsall	27	(1)
- * Club domestic league appearances and goals

Clifford Godfrey (17 February 1909 – 1986) was an English professional footballer. He was born in Baildon, Yorkshire.

Godfrey began his career at Guiseley while also working as a miner. In 1928 he signed for Bradford Park Avenue and, despite spending six seasons at the club, never fully managed to hold down a first team place. He was allowed to join Cardiff City in 1935 where he did manage to establish himself in the side, being ever present during the 1936–37 season, as well as captaining the side on numerous occasions. At the start of the 1937–38 season he scored his only goal for the club in a 4–1 win over Northampton Town. In 1938 he moved to Walsall where he played in the last season before the outbreak of World War II. He continued to play for the club during the war but retired before the return of the Football League in 1946.
