= Cecil McCaughey =

English footballer

Personal information
- Full name: Cecil McCaughey
- Date of birth: 1909
- Place of birth: Bootle, England
- Height: 5 ft 10 in (1.78 m)
- Position: Right half

Senior career*
Years	Team	Apps	(Gls)
1933	Liverpool	0	(0)
1933	Burscough Rangers		
1933–1935	Blackburn Rovers	0	(0)
1935–1937	Coventry City	35	(0)
1937–1939	Cardiff City	66	(5)
1939	Southport	0	(0)
- * Club domestic league appearances and goals

Cecil McCaughey (1909 – after 1939) was an English professional footballer who played as a right half. During his career, he made over 100 appearances in the Football League during spells with Coventry City and Cardiff City.

== Career ==
Born in Bootle, McCaughey began his career playing local amateur football in the Lancashire League and was briefly signed to Liverpool without appearing for their first team. After a spell with Burscough Rangers, he returned to the Football League by joined Blackburn Rovers, originally playing as a central defender. However, he again made no professional appearances, playing only for the club's reserve side in The Central League.

In May 1935, he joined Coventry City after over two years with Blackburn making his professional debut in a 2–0 victory over Watford on 5 October 1935. In his first season with the club, he helped them win promotion after finishing as champions of the Third Division South.

He left Coventry in 1937 to join Cardiff City, making his debut on the opening day of the 1937–38 season in a 1–1 draw with Clapton Orient. In his first season, he missed only one league match for the side but fell out of favour in his second following the arrival of Bill Corkhill. He moved to Southport in 1939, however the outbreak of World War II brought an end to his playing career.

== Honours ==
Coventry City

- Football League Third Division South winner: 1935–36
