= Arthur Granville =

Welsh footballer

Personal information
- Full name: Arthur David Granville
- Date of birth: 8 May 1911
- Place of birth: Llwynypia, Wales
- Date of death: 1987 (aged 75–76)
- Height: 5 ft 9 1/2 in (1.77 m)
- Position: Defender

Senior career*
Years	Team	Apps	(Gls)
1929–1934	Porth United	?	(?)
1934–1938	Cardiff City	98	(6)
- * Club domestic league appearances and goals

Arthur David Granville (8 May 1911 – 1987) was a Welsh professional footballer. He made 98 appearances in the Football League for Cardiff City and captained the side.

Granville was born in Llwynypia. He joined Cardiff City in 1934 from the amateur side Porth United and, after a slow start, managed to establish himself in the side and was later appointed club captain. He scored six league goals during his time at the club, all of which came from the penalty spot. Following the outbreak of World War II he stayed at Ninian Park to help coach the numerous youngsters, whilst serving in the Royal Air Force, and at the end of the war in 1946 he decided not to return to playing football and subsequently retired, instead becoming involved in assessing prospective players and also coaching local amateurs.

His grandson Andy Gorman also later played for Cardiff City.
