= Bert Turner (footballer, born 1907) =

English footballer

Albert Turner
Personal information
- Date of birth: 3 September 1907
- Place of birth: Sheffield, England
- Date of death: 1959 (aged 51–52)
- Height: 5 ft 11 in (1.80 m)
- Position: Outside left

Senior career*
| Years | Team | Apps | (Gls) |
| 1928–1931 | Hull City | 19 | (2) |
| 1931–1933 | Walsall | 56 | (21) |
| 1933–1937 | Doncaster Rovers | 119 | (51) |
| 1937–1938 | Cardiff City | 42 | (20) |
| 1938–1939 | Bristol Rovers | 21 | (4) |
| Total | | 257 | (98) |
- * Club domestic league appearances and goals

Albert Turner (3 September 1907 – 1959) was an English footballer who played outside left in the 1930s for Hull City, Walsall, Doncaster Rovers, Cardiff City and Bristol Rovers.

== Playing career ==
=== Doncaster Rovers ===
Turner began his career at Hull City, then moved to Walsall for one and a bit seasons. He was then being brought to 3rd Division North side Doncaster, by manager David Menzies, midway through the 1933–34 season. Scoring on his debut on 16 December in a 4–2 home victory against Gateshead, that season he netted 14 goals over 22 games as Rovers finished the season in 5th position.

The following season, he was the leading scorer at the club with 26, including 1 cup goal, an impressive achievement for a winger. On 16 February 1935, Turner scored 5 in a 7–1 win against visitors New Brighton. He also scored in five consecutive matches and then six consecutive matches during this 1934–35 season, a season where Doncaster finished as League Champions.

In 1935–36, the newly promoted club finished in 18th place out of 22 in the 2nd Division, but Turner still scored 10 times including a cup goal, ending up as 3rd top scorer behind Reg Baines and Dizzie Burton.

On 21 October 1936, Turner played in Rovers first match abroad. He had a goal controversially disallowed in a 7–2 defeat by the Dutch National XI in Rotterdam. During this season he played in 18 out of the 42 league games, with C. Johnston playing outside left in most of the others. Following Rovers finishing bottom of the league and being relegated, manager Fred Emery decided to have a clear out resulting in Turner moving to Cardiff City.

=== Cardiff City ===
Turner scored 20 times playing on the left wing in the 1937–38 season at Cardiff in the 3rd Division South.

=== Bristol Rovers ===
After only one season with Cardiff, Turner moved to fellow 3rd Division South side Bristol Rovers where he played until the outbreak of the war.

== Honours ==
Doncaster Rovers

- Third Division North

Champions 1934–35
