= 1938–39 Football League =

47th season of the Football League

The Football League
- Season: 1938–39
- Champions: Everton
- New Team in League: Ipswich Town

The 1938–39 season was the 47th season of the Football League.

== Final league tables ==
The tables below are reproduced here in the exact form that they can be found at The Rec.Sport.Soccer Statistics Foundation website and in Rothmans Book of Football League Records 1888–89 to 1978–79, with home and away statistics separated.

Match results are drawn from The Rec.Sport.Soccer Statistics Foundation website and Rothmans for the First Division and from Rothmans for the Second Division and for the two Third Divisions.

Beginning with the season 1894–95, clubs finishing level on points were separated according to goal average (goals scored divided by goals conceded), or more properly put, goal ratio. In case one or more teams had the same goal difference, this system favoured those teams who had scored fewer goals, if the teams had a positive goal difference. The goal average system was eventually scrapped beginning with the 1976–77 season.

From the 1922–23 season, the bottom two teams of both Third Division North and Third Division South were required to apply for re-election.

== First Division ==
First Division
- Season: 1938–39
- Champions: Everton; 5th English title
- Relegated: Birmingham; Leicester City
- Matches: 462
- Goals: 1,418 (3.07 per match)
- Top goalscorer: Tommy Lawton (35 goals)
- Biggest home win: Middlesbrough 9–2 Blackpool (10 December 1938); Wolverhampton Wanderers 7–0 Everton (22 February 1939)
- Biggest away win: Leicester City 1–5 Charlton Athletic (9 February 1939); Charlton Athletic 0–4 Wolverhampton Wanderers (10 December 1938); Sunderland 1–5 Aston Villa (26 December 1938)
- Highest scoring: Middlesbrough 9–2 Blackpool (10 December 1938)

Pos	Team	Pld	W	D	L	GF	GA	GAv	Pts	Relegation
1	Everton (C)	42	27	5	10	88	52	1.692	59	
2	Wolverhampton Wanderers	42	22	11	9	88	39	2.256	55	
3	Charlton Athletic	42	22	6	14	75	59	1.271	50	
4	Middlesbrough	42	20	9	13	93	74	1.257	49	
5	Arsenal	42	19	9	14	55	41	1.341	47	
6	Derby County	42	19	8	15	66	55	1.200	46	
7	Stoke City	42	17	12	13	71	68	1.044	46	
8	Bolton Wanderers	42	15	15	12	67	58	1.155	45	
9	Preston North End	42	16	12	14	63	59	1.068	44	
10	Grimsby Town	42	16	11	15	61	69	0.884	43	
11	Liverpool	42	14	14	14	62	63	0.984	42	
12	Aston Villa	42	16	9	17	71	60	1.183	41	
13	Leeds United	42	16	9	17	59	67	0.881	41	
14	Manchester United	42	11	16	15	57	65	0.877	38	
15	Blackpool	42	12	14	16	56	68	0.824	38	
16	Sunderland	42	13	12	17	54	67	0.806	38	
17	Portsmouth	42	12	13	17	47	70	0.671	37	
18	Brentford	42	14	8	20	53	74	0.716	36	
19	Huddersfield Town	42	12	11	19	58	64	0.906	35	
20	Chelsea	42	12	9	21	64	80	0.800	33	
21	Birmingham (R)	42	12	8	22	62	84	0.738	32	Relegation to the Second Division
22	Leicester City (R)	42	9	11	22	48	82	0.585	29	Relegation to the Second Division

Source: World Football
Rules for classification: 1) Points; 2) Goal average; 3) Goals scored
(C) Champions; (R) Relegated

=== Results ===
Home \ Away	ARS	AST	BIR	BLP	BOL	BRE	CHA	CHE	DER	EVE	GRI	HUD	LEE	LEI	LIV	MUN	MID	POR	PNE	STK	SUN	WOL
Arsenal		0–0	3–1	2–1	3–1	2–0	2–0	1–0	1–2	1–2	2–0	1–0	2–3	0–0	2–0	2–1	1–2	2–0	1–0	4–1	2–0	0–0
Aston Villa	1–3		5–1	3–1	1–3	5–0	2–0	6–2	0–1	0–3	0–2	4–0	2–1	1–2	2–0	0–2	1–1	2–0	3–0	3–0	1–1	2–2
Birmingham	1–2	3–0		2–1	0–2	5–1	3–4	1–1	3–0	1–0	1–1	1–1	4–0	2–1	0–0	3–3	2–1	2–0	1–3	1–2	1–2	3–2
Blackpool	1–0	2–4	2–1		0–0	4–1	0–0	5–1	2–2	0–2	3–1	1–1	1–2	1–1	1–1	3–5	4–0	2–1	2–1	1–1	1–1	1–0
Bolton Wanderers	1–1	1–2	3–0	0–1		1–1	2–1	0–2	2–1	4–2	1–1	3–2	2–2	4–0	3–1	0–0	4–1	5–1	0–2	1–3	2–1	0–0
Brentford	1–0	2–4	0–1	1–1	2–2		1–0	1–0	1–3	2–0	1–2	2–1	0–1	2–0	2–1	2–5	2–1	2–0	3–1	1–0	2–3	0–1
Charlton Athletic	1–0	1–0	4–4	3–1	2–1	1–1		2–0	1–0	2–1	3–1	2–1	2–0	1–0	1–3	7–1	3–0	3–3	3–1	4–2	3–0	0–4
Chelsea	4–2	2–1	2–2	1–1	1–1	1–3	1–3		0–2	0–2	5–1	3–0	2–2	3–0	4–1	0–1	4–2	1–0	3–1	1–1	4–0	1–3
Derby County	1–2	2–1	0–1	2–1	3–0	1–2	3–1	0–1		2–1	4–1	1–0	1–0	1–1	2–2	5–1	1–4	0–1	2–0	5–0	1–0	2–2
Everton	2–0	3–0	4–2	4–0	2–1	2–1	1–4	4–1	2–2		3–0	3–2	4–0	4–0	2–1	3–0	4–0	5–1	0–0	1–1	6–2	1–0
Grimsby Town	2–1	1–2	1–0	2–0	1–1	0–0	1–1	2–1	1–1	3–0		3–3	3–2	6–1	2–1	1–0	0–2	2–1	1–1	3–1	1–3	2–4
Huddersfield Town	1–1	1–1	3–1	3–0	2–1	1–2	4–0	3–1	3–0	3–0	2–0		0–1	2–0	1–1	1–1	0–1	3–0	3–0	1–4	0–1	1–2
Leeds United	4–2	2–0	2–0	1–0	1–2	3–2	2–1	1–1	1–4	1–2	0–1	2–1		8–2	1–1	3–1	0–1	2–2	2–1	0–0	3–3	1–0
Leicester City	0–2	1–1	2–1	3–4	0–0	1–1	1–5	3–2	2–3	3–0	0–2	0–1	2–0		2–2	1–1	5–3	5–0	2–1	2–2	0–2	0–2
Liverpool	2–2	3–0	4–0	1–0	1–2	1–0	1–0	2–1	2–1	0–3	2–2	3–3	3–0	1–1		1–0	3–1	4–4	4–1	1–0	1–1	0–2
Manchester United	1–0	1–1	4–1	0–0	2–2	3–0	0–2	5–1	1–1	0–2	3–1	1–1	0–0	3–0	2–0		1–1	1–1	1–1	0–1	0–1	1–3
Middlesbrough	1–1	1–1	2–2	9–2	1–2	3–1	4–0	1–1	2–0	4–4	3–2	4–1	1–2	3–2	3–0	3–1		8–2	2–2	5–1	3–0	1–0
Portsmouth	0–0	0–0	2–0	1–0	2–1	2–2	0–2	2–1	1–3	0–1	2–1	4–0	2–0	0–1	1–1	0–0	1–1		0–0	2–0	2–1	1–0
Preston North End	2–1	3–2	5–0	1–1	2–2	2–0	2–0	1–1	4–1	0–1	1–1	3–0	2–0	2–1	1–0	1–1	3–1	2–2		1–1	2–1	4–2
Stoke City	1–0	3–1	6–3	1–1	4–1	3–2	1–0	6–1	3–0	0–0	1–2	2–2	1–1	1–0	3–1	1–1	1–3	1–1	3–1		3–1	5–3
Sunderland	0–0	1–5	1–0	1–2	2–2	1–1	1–1	3–2	1–0	1–2	1–1	0–0	2–1	2–0	2–3	5–2	1–2	0–2	1–2	3–0		1–1
Wolverhampton Wanderers	0–1	2–1	2–1	1–1	1–1	5–2	3–1	2–0	0–0	7–0	5–0	3–0	4–1	0–0	2–2	3–0	6–1	3–0	3–0	3–0	0–0	

Updated to match(es) played on unknown. Source:
Legend: Blue = home team win; Yellow = draw; Red = away team win.

=== Maps ===
Locations of the Football League First Division London teams
Locations of the Football League First Division teams

== Second Division ==
Second Division
- Season: 1938–39
- Champions: Blackburn Rovers
- Promoted: Blackburn Rovers; Sheffield United
- Relegated: Norwich City; Tranmere Rovers
- Matches: 462
- Goals: 1,441 (3.12 per match)
- Top goalscorer: Hugh Billington (28 goals)
- Biggest home win: Sheffield Wednesday 7–0 Norwich City (19 November 1938)
- Biggest away win: Tranmere Rovers 3–9 Manchester City (26 December 1938)
- Highest scoring: Tranmere Rovers 3–9 Manchester City (26 December 1938)

Pos	Team	Pld	W	D	L	GF	GA	GAv	Pts	Promotion or relegation
1	Blackburn Rovers (C, P)	42	25	5	12	94	60	1.567	55	Promotion to the First Division
2	Sheffield United (P)	42	20	14	8	69	41	1.683	54	Promotion to the First Division
3	Sheffield Wednesday	42	21	11	10	88	59	1.492	53	
4	Coventry City	42	21	8	13	62	45	1.378	50	
5	Manchester City	42	21	7	14	96	72	1.333	49	
6	Chesterfield	42	20	9	13	69	52	1.327	49	
7	Luton Town	42	22	5	15	82	66	1.242	49	
8	Tottenham Hotspur	42	19	9	14	67	62	1.081	47	
9	Newcastle United	42	18	10	14	61	48	1.271	46	
10	West Bromwich Albion	42	18	9	15	89	72	1.236	45	
11	West Ham United	42	17	10	15	70	52	1.346	44	
12	Fulham	42	17	10	15	61	55	1.109	44	
13	Millwall	42	14	14	14	64	53	1.208	42	
14	Burnley	42	15	9	18	50	56	0.893	39	
15	Plymouth Argyle	42	15	8	19	49	55	0.891	38	
16	Bury	42	12	13	17	65	74	0.878	37	
17	Bradford (Park Avenue)	42	12	11	19	61	82	0.744	35	
18	Southampton	42	13	9	20	56	82	0.683	35	
19	Swansea Town	42	11	12	19	50	83	0.602	34	
20	Nottingham Forest	42	10	11	21	49	82	0.598	31	
21	Norwich City (R)	42	13	5	24	50	91	0.549	31	Relegation to the Third Division South
22	Tranmere Rovers (R)	42	6	5	31	39	99	0.394	17	Relegation to the Third Division North

Rules for classification: 1) Points; 2) Goal average; 3) Goals scored
(C) Champions; (P) Promoted; (R) Relegated

=== Results ===
Home \ Away	BLB	BPA	BUR	BRY	CHF	COV	FUL	LUT	MCI	MIL	NEW	NWC	NOT	PLY	SHU	SHW	SOU	SWA	TOT	TRA	WBA	WHU
Blackburn Rovers		6–4	1–0	1–0	3–0	0–2	2–1	2–0	3–3	3–1	3–0	6–0	3–2	4–0	1–2	2–4	3–0	4–0	3–1	3–2	3–0	3–1
Bradford Park Avenue	0–4		2–2	3–2	0–0	0–2	1–5	2–1	4–2	1–0	0–1	3–0	1–2	2–2	0–3	3–1	2–1	1–1	0–0	3–0	4–4	1–2
Burnley	3–2	0–0		0–1	1–2	1–0	2–0	3–2	1–1	2–0	2–0	3–0	2–1	1–0	2–3	1–2	2–1	1–1	1–0	3–1	0–3	1–0
Bury	2–4	0–1	1–0		3–1	5–0	0–2	2–5	1–5	1–1	1–1	2–3	2–1	3–0	2–2	2–3	5–2	4–0	3–1	5–0	3–3	1–1
Chesterfield	0–2	2–2	3–2	2–1		3–0	0–1	1–2	0–3	3–0	2–0	2–0	7–1	3–1	1–0	3–1	6–1	6–1	3–1	3–0	3–1	1–0
Coventry City	0–1	3–1	1–1	0–0	2–0		3–1	1–0	0–1	2–1	1–0	2–0	5–1	1–2	0–3	1–0	3–0	3–0	4–0	2–0	1–1	0–0
Fulham	2–3	4–0	0–0	1–2	2–0	1–0		2–1	2–1	2–1	1–1	2–0	2–2	1–2	1–2	2–2	1–1	1–0	1–0	1–0	3–0	3–2
Luton Town	1–1	2–2	1–0	2–1	5–0	1–3	2–1		3–0	0–0	2–1	2–1	1–0	3–4	2–0	1–5	6–2	6–3	0–0	3–0	3–1	1–2
Manchester City	3–2	5–1	2–0	0–0	3–1	3–0	3–5	1–2		1–6	4–1	4–1	3–0	1–3	3–2	1–1	2–1	5–0	2–0	5–2	3–3	2–4
Millwall	4–1	3–1	1–1	0–0	3–1	0–0	1–1	2–1	3–1		1–1	6–0	5–0	3–0	4–0	2–0	0–1	1–1	2–0	2–1	1–5	0–2
Newcastle United	2–2	1–0	3–2	6–0	0–1	0–4	2–1	2–0	0–2	2–2		4–0	4–0	2–1	0–0	2–1	1–0	1–2	0–1	5–1	5–1	2–0
Norwich City	4–0	1–3	4–0	3–1	2–0	1–1	3–3	2–1	0–0	0–2	1–1		1–0	2–1	1–2	2–2	2–1	3–0	1–2	2–0	2–3	2–6
Nottingham Forest	1–3	2–0	2–2	1–1	0–1	3–0	1–1	2–4	3–4	3–0	2–0	1–0		2–1	0–2	3–3	0–2	1–2	2–1	2–2	2–0	0–0
Plymouth Argyle	1–0	4–1	1–0	0–1	0–0	0–2	0–0	4–1	0–0	2–2	0–1	1–0	3–0		0–1	1–1	2–0	0–0	0–1	3–1	2–1	0–0
Sheffield United	0–0	3–1	1–1	1–1	1–1	0–0	2–0	2–2	1–0	2–1	0–0	4–0	0–1	0–1		0–0	5–1	1–2	6–1	2–0	1–1	3–1
Sheffield Wednesday	3–0	2–0	4–1	2–0	0–0	2–2	5–1	4–1	3–1	3–1	0–2	7–0	1–1	1–2	1–0		2–0	1–1	1–0	2–0	2–1	1–4
Southampton	1–3	3–2	2–1	0–0	2–2	0–2	2–1	0–4	1–2	1–1	0–0	3–1	2–2	2–1	2–2	4–3		4–1	1–2	3–1	2–1	0–2
Swansea Town	2–1	2–2	4–0	3–3	1–1	2–4	1–1	2–3	2–0	1–1	0–1	0–1	1–0	2–1	1–2	0–1	1–3		1–1	1–0	3–2	3–2
Tottenham Hotspur	4–3	2–2	1–0	4–3	2–2	2–1	1–0	0–1	2–3	4–0	1–0	4–1	4–1	1–0	2–2	3–3	1–1	3–0		3–1	2–2	2–1
Tranmere Rovers	1–1	2–1	0–3	3–0	0–1	1–2	0–1	2–3	3–9	2–0	0–3	0–1	1–1	2–0	0–2	1–4	1–1	2–0	0–2		3–1	2–2
West Bromwich Albion	2–0	0–2	1–2	6–0	1–0	3–1	3–0	3–0	3–1	0–0	5–2	4–2	0–0	4–2	3–4	5–1	2–0	0–0	4–3	2–0		3–2
West Ham United	1–2	0–2	1–0	0–0	1–1	4–1	1–0	0–1	2–1	0–0	1–1	2–0	5–0	2–1	0–0	2–3	1–2	5–2	0–2	6–1	2–1	

Updated to match(es) played on unknown. Source: Ian Laschke: Rothmans Book of Football League Records 1888–89 to 1978–79. Macdonald and Jane’s, London & Sydney, 1980.
Legend: Blue = home team win; Yellow = draw; Red = away team win.

=== Maps ===
Locations of the Football League Second Division London teams
Locations of the Football League Second Division teams

== Third Division North ==
Football League Third Division North
- Season: 1938–1939
- Champions: Barnsley (2nd title)
- Failed re-election: None
- Matches: 462
- Goals: 1,609 (3.48 per match)
- Top goalscorer: Wally Hunt (Carlisle United), 32

Pos	Team	Pld	W	D	L	GF	GA	GAv	Pts	Promotion or relegation
1	Barnsley (C, P)	42	30	7	5	94	34	2.765	67	Promotion to the Second Division
2	Doncaster Rovers	42	21	14	7	87	47	1.851	56	
3	Bradford City	42	22	8	12	89	56	1.589	52	
4	Southport	42	20	10	12	75	54	1.389	50	
5	Oldham Athletic	42	22	5	15	76	59	1.288	49	
6	Chester	42	20	9	13	88	70	1.257	49	
7	Hull City	42	18	10	14	83	74	1.122	46	
8	Crewe Alexandra	42	19	6	17	82	70	1.171	44	
9	Stockport County	42	17	9	16	91	77	1.182	43	
10	Gateshead	42	14	14	14	74	67	1.104	42	
11	Rotherham United	42	17	8	17	64	64	1.000	42	
12	Halifax Town	42	13	16	13	52	54	0.963	42	
13	Barrow	42	16	9	17	66	65	1.015	41	
14	Wrexham	42	17	7	18	66	79	0.835	41	
15	Rochdale	42	15	9	18	92	82	1.122	39	
16	New Brighton	42	15	9	18	68	73	0.932	39	
17	Lincoln City	42	12	9	21	66	92	0.717	33	
18	Darlington	42	13	7	22	62	92	0.674	33	
19	Carlisle United	42	13	7	22	66	111	0.595	33	
20	York City	42	12	8	22	64	92	0.696	32	
21	Hartlepools United	42	12	7	23	55	94	0.585	31	Re-elected
22	Accrington Stanley	42	7	6	29	49	103	0.476	20	Re-elected

Source: rsssf.com
(C) Champions; (P) Promoted

=== Results ===
Home \ Away	ACC	BAR	BRW	BRA	CRL	CHE	CRE	DAR	DON	GAT	HAL	HAR	HUL	LIN	NWB	OLD	ROC	ROT	SOU	STP	WRE	YOR
Accrington Stanley		0–2	0–2	2–3	1–1	2–3	2–1	3–0	0–0	1–1	1–2	0–0	1–1	3–4	1–2	1–3	0–5	2–1	1–4	3–2	3–1	3–1
Barnsley	4–1		4–0	5–2	3–0	3–0	5–2	7–1	1–1	2–0	1–0	2–0	5–1	4–0	1–1	3–0	2–0	2–0	3–1	0–1	2–1	1–0
Barrow	2–3	1–2		2–1	5–0	0–1	1–2	2–0	4–4	1–1	0–0	1–1	3–1	2–2	3–0	2–0	3–1	4–1	4–0	0–2	4–0	2–0
Bradford City	2–1	0–2	3–0		2–0	1–0	4–1	6–2	2–1	1–1	1–0	0–1	6–2	3–0	3–3	1–4	3–0	5–2	2–1	4–0	4–0	6–0
Carlisle United	6–4	3–1	3–0	0–2		1–3	1–0	1–1	2–3	2–2	1–2	2–0	1–2	4–3	1–1	2–0	5–1	3–1	1–1	3–2	1–1	1–3
Chester	1–0	2–1	1–2	3–2	6–1		4–0	0–0	0–4	2–2	5–1	8–2	1–1	0–0	1–3	4–2	0–0	1–4	2–0	4–3	4–2	5–1
Crewe Alexandra	2–1	0–0	1–1	0–0	7–1	0–2		2–0	1–2	3–2	2–2	3–2	0–1	6–0	7–1	1–2	4–1	0–0	4–2	2–1	1–0	8–2
Darlington	3–0	0–1	3–1	0–4	2–1	3–3	1–0		1–2	5–2	1–0	3–0	0–1	3–1	3–0	3–3	1–2	3–1	0–2	4–3	3–1	1–2
Doncaster Rovers	7–1	1–3	1–1	1–2	1–0	4–1	1–2	4–1		2–3	0–0	3–1	1–0	4–1	4–1	3–2	5–0	1–1	0–0	3–1	0–0	1–0
Gateshead	4–1	1–1	2–1	0–0	1–1	3–0	0–5	0–2	2–0		2–0	2–0	2–2	4–0	0–3	2–0	2–2	7–1	0–0	4–1	5–1	2–3
Halifax Town	2–0	1–4	1–0	2–2	5–1	1–1	0–0	1–1	0–0	3–3		2–0	1–0	2–0	3–1	0–0	2–1	1–1	1–1	3–3	0–2	2–1
Hartlepool	2–1	0–1	1–2	1–3	2–1	2–5	0–1	3–0	1–3	3–1	1–0		3–3	2–1	3–2	0–0	4–2	1–1	0–2	4–2	0–0	3–2
Hull City	6–1	0–1	4–0	3–2	11–1	3–0	2–1	3–2	0–0	1–0	1–1	4–1		4–2	3–0	0–2	3–3	0–2	2–1	4–4	1–1	2–0
Lincoln City	3–0	2–4	1–1	4–0	2–1	0–3	3–2	3–0	2–5	1–0	0–0	2–2	0–3		0–0	1–0	2–2	0–1	0–1	3–2	8–3	3–3
New Brighton	4–1	1–2	2–0	2–1	2–3	1–3	1–2	3–0	3–6	0–1	1–0	5–2	6–1	3–2		0–1	3–1	3–0	1–1	0–0	2–3	3–2
Oldham Athletic	2–0	4–2	1–0	2–1	6–0	1–3	3–0	2–0	0–0	1–3	1–0	4–2	4–1	1–0	1–0		1–2	2–0	2–4	3–1	4–2	6–0
Rochdale	4–1	2–1	2–2	1–1	2–3	5–2	5–0	6–1	1–1	5–2	4–5	3–4	4–0	4–0	2–0	1–2		0–1	5–0	0–1	0–0	2–2
Rotherham United	2–1	0–1	1–2	2–0	4–0	2–0	4–1	3–3	0–0	2–2	0–1	5–1	0–2	1–3	0–0	3–1	7–1		1–0	3–2	3–0	2–0
Southport	1–0	0–0	4–1	2–2	7–1	2–0	1–2	4–1	0–4	2–0	1–0	2–0	4–0	4–1	1–1	0–0	4–1	1–0		3–0	3–1	1–1
Stockport County	3–0	1–1	3–1	2–0	3–0	0–0	5–1	5–2	1–2	3–2	3–3	5–0	2–2	3–3	1–1	3–1	1–2	5–0	3–1		2–1	3–1
Wrexham	2–0	1–1	3–0	1–1	2–5	3–2	0–4	3–1	3–0	2–0	3–2	3–0	4–2	1–0	1–2	4–1	1–0	2–0	4–3	2–1		1–3
York City	2–2	2–3	2–3	0–1	4–1	2–2	4–1	1–1	2–2	1–1	3–0	2–0	1–0	1–3	2–0	4–1	0–7	0–1	2–3	1–2	1–0	

Updated to match(es) played on unknown. Source: Ian Laschke: Rothmans Book of Football League Records 1888–89 to 1978–79. Macdonald and Jane’s, London & Sydney, 1980.
Legend: Blue = home team win; Yellow = draw; Red = away team win.

=== Maps ===
Locations of the Football League Third Division North teams

== Third Division South ==
Football League Third Division South
- Season: 1938–1939
- Champions: Newport County (1st title)
- Failed re-election: None
- Matches: 462
- Goals: 1,319 (2.85 per match)
- Top goalscorer: Ben Morton (Swindon Town), 28

Pos	Team	Pld	W	D	L	GF	GA	GAv	Pts	Promotion or relegation
1	Newport County (C, P)	42	22	11	9	58	45	1.289	55	Promotion to the Second Division
2	Crystal Palace	42	20	12	10	71	52	1.365	52	
3	Brighton & Hove Albion	42	19	11	12	68	49	1.388	49	
4	Watford	42	17	12	13	62	51	1.216	46	
5	Reading	42	16	14	12	69	59	1.169	46	
6	Queens Park Rangers	42	15	14	13	68	49	1.388	44	
7	Ipswich Town	42	16	12	14	62	52	1.192	44	
8	Bristol City	42	16	12	14	61	63	0.968	44	
9	Swindon Town	42	18	8	16	72	77	0.935	44	
10	Aldershot	42	16	12	14	53	66	0.803	44	
11	Notts County	42	17	9	16	59	54	1.093	43	
12	Southend United	42	16	9	17	61	64	0.953	41	
13	Cardiff City	42	15	11	16	61	65	0.938	41	
14	Exeter City	42	13	14	15	65	82	0.793	40	
15	Bournemouth & Boscombe Athletic	42	13	13	16	52	58	0.897	39	
16	Mansfield Town	42	12	15	15	44	62	0.710	39	
17	Northampton Town	42	15	8	19	51	58	0.879	38	
18	Port Vale	42	14	9	19	52	58	0.897	37	
19	Torquay United	42	14	9	19	54	70	0.771	37	
20	Clapton Orient	42	11	13	18	53	55	0.964	35	
21	Walsall	42	11	11	20	68	69	0.986	33	Re-elected
22	Bristol Rovers	42	10	13	19	55	61	0.902	33	Re-elected

(C) Champions; (P) Promoted

=== Results ===
Home \ Away	ALD	B&BA	B&HA	BRI	BRR	CAR	CLA	CRY	EXE	IPS	MAN	NPC	NOR	NTC	PTV	QPR	REA	STD	SWI	TOR	WAL	WAT
Aldershot		2–1	1–1	0–1	1–0	1–1	1–0	2–1	2–0	3–1	3–0	1–0	3–0	0–3	1–0	2–0	1–1	1–0	1–0	1–1	3–3	1–1
Bournemouth & Boscombe Athletic	4–0		2–0	4–0	5–2	0–0	0–0	1–1	2–0	0–0	1–1	0–1	3–1	3–2	1–1	4–2	0–0	0–4	2–0	2–5	3–1	1–1
Brighton & Hove Albion	0–3	1–1		1–0	6–3	1–2	2–0	0–0	6–1	2–0	3–0	0–0	1–0	2–0	1–0	3–1	2–2	3–0	4–0	2–0	3–1	0–0
Bristol City	1–0	2–0	2–0		2–1	1–1	3–1	1–1	4–1	3–2	2–0	0–2	0–0	2–1	5–1	2–2	5–1	1–0	1–1	1–3	2–1	2–0
Bristol Rovers	0–0	1–0	0–1	1–1		1–1	1–0	1–2	4–1	3–3	3–0	0–0	1–0	0–0	0–1	0–0	2–4	4–1	5–0	0–1	2–0	1–1
Cardiff City	2–4	5–0	4–1	2–1	0–2		1–2	0–1	1–2	2–1	0–0	1–2	2–0	4–1	2–4	1–0	0–1	1–0	2–1	3–1	2–1	5–3
Clapton Orient	2–0	1–1	2–0	1–1	2–1	1–1		4–0	3–3	1–1	0–0	1–3	3–0	1–1	1–0	2–1	1–2	5–0	5–0	3–0	1–1	0–0
Crystal Palace	3–0	3–0	1–0	3–2	0–0	2–0	4–2		3–2	3–0	6–2	1–1	2–0	5–1	1–0	0–1	0–0	4–3	1–1	1–3	4–0	2–0
Exeter City	3–3	0–0	2–2	1–1	2–1	1–1	2–1	4–4		3–0	2–0	3–1	3–2	1–0	1–3	1–1	3–2	3–3	0–0	1–2	3–2	1–3
Ipswich Town	7–2	0–2	0–0	4–0	0–0	1–2	3–0	2–1	2–2		5–1	1–4	2–0	0–2	2–0	1–0	2–1	4–2	3–1	1–0	1–0	5–1
Mansfield Town	1–0	2–0	4–2	3–2	1–3	2–2	1–0	0–0	4–2	0–1		0–2	1–1	2–0	2–0	2–2	0–0	3–1	1–1	4–0	0–0	0–0
Newport County	1–0	2–2	2–0	0–2	2–0	3–0	2–1	2–0	0–0	3–2	0–0		1–1	2–1	0–2	2–0	2–0	3–0	6–4	1–0	2–1	1–0
Northampton Town	5–0	2–0	1–4	2–2	2–1	2–1	3–0	0–0	0–0	2–0	3–4	1–0		2–1	2–0	1–0	1–1	2–2	0–2	4–1	4–1	2–0
Notts County	1–1	0–1	4–3	0–0	3–1	1–1	1–0	0–1	3–1	2–1	1–1	2–0	1–0		4–0	0–0	2–0	4–1	2–0	5–1	0–0	0–3
Port Vale	1–3	2–0	1–1	4–0	2–1	1–1	1–1	2–0	3–2	0–0	3–0	2–1	0–2	3–1		1–2	0–2	2–2	2–0	0–1	5–1	1–2
Queens Park Rangers	7–0	2–0	1–2	3–1	1–1	5–0	1–1	1–2	5–0	0–0	3–0	0–0	3–0	0–1	2–2		2–2	1–1	2–1	1–1	3–0	1–0
Reading	5–0	1–0	3–0	2–2	2–0	0–0	2–2	3–1	1–1	2–1	0–0	0–1	5–1	3–1	2–1	2–4		3–0	3–0	3–5	1–1	3–2
Southend	2–1	2–2	1–1	2–0	3–2	2–0	1–0	3–1	0–1	0–0	2–0	5–0	2–0	1–0	0–0	2–1	2–0		2–3	1–1	2–0	3–0
Swindon Town	2–1	4–2	3–2	1–0	2–1	4–1	2–0	2–2	2–1	1–1	1–2	8–0	1–0	4–1	1–1	2–2	4–2	2–1		3–1	1–4	3–0
Torquay United	1–1	2–0	0–2	3–1	2–2	1–3	2–1	1–2	0–1	1–1	3–0	1–1	1–2	0–2	1–0	2–3	1–1	2–0	1–3		0–1	2–1
Walsall	2–2	1–2	0–2	5–0	2–2	6–3	5–1	1–1	1–2	0–1	0–0	1–1	1–0	3–3	4–0	0–1	3–0	0–2	5–0	5–0		2–0
Watford	1–1	1–0	1–1	2–2	4–1	1–0	1–0	4–1	4–2	0–0	2–0	1–1	2–0	0–1	2–0	4–1	3–1	3–0	4–1	0–0	4–2	

Updated to match(es) played on unknown. Source: Ian Laschke: Rothmans Book of Football League Records 1888–89 to 1978–79. Macdonald and Jane’s, London & Sydney, 1980.
Legend: Blue = home team win; Yellow = draw; Red = away team win.

=== Maps ===
Locations of the Football League Third Division South London teams
Locations of the Football League Third Division South teams

== Attendances ==
=== First Division ===
#	Football club	Home games	Average attendance
1	Aston Villa	21	39,932
2	Arsenal FC	21	39,102
3	Everton FC	21	35,040
4	Liverpool FC	21	31,422
5	Chelsea FC	21	30,999
6	Manchester United	21	30,365
7	Wolverhampton Wanderers	21	29,328
8	Birmingham FC	21	25,528
9	Charlton Athletic	21	25,141
10	Portsmouth FC	21	23,154
11	Bolton Wanderers	21	23,073
12	Stoke City	21	22,392
13	Brentford FC	21	22,069
14	Sunderland AFC	21	21,740
15	Preston North End	21	21,534
16	Middlesbrough FC	21	21,184
17	Leeds United	21	19,309
18	Blackpool FC	21	19,178
19	Derby County	21	19,101
20	Huddersfield Town	21	16,490
21	Leicester City	21	16,225
22	Grimsby Town	21	12,064

=== Second Division ===
#	Football club	Home games	Average attendance
1	Newcastle United	21	32,693
2	Manchester City	21	31,291
3	Tottenham Hotspur	21	29,397
4	Millwall FC	21	27,387
5	Sheffield Wednesday	21	27,147
6	Sheffield United	21	26,022
7	West Ham United	21	20,135
8	Coventry City	21	19,506
9	Fulham FC	21	18,679
10	West Bromwich Albion	21	18,400
11	Blackburn Rovers	21	18,262
12	Plymouth Argyle	21	16,735
13	Luton Town	21	15,327
14	Southampton FC	21	14,596
15	Norwich City	21	14,242
16	Burnley FC	21	13,731
17	Chesterfield FC	21	13,272
18	Nottingham Forest	21	13,033
19	Swansea Town	21	10,843
20	Bury FC	21	10,175
21	Bradford Park Avenue	21	10,005
22	Tranmere Rovers	21	9,938

== See also ==
- 1938-39 in English football
- 1938 in association football
- 1939 in association football
