= James Prescott (footballer) =

English footballer

John Robert Prescott
Personal information
- Date of birth: 1914
- Place of birth: Waterloo, England
- Date of death: 1989 (aged 74–75)
- Place of death: Cardiff, Wales
- Height: 5 ft 10 in (1.78 m)
- Position: Winger

Senior career*
Years	Team	Apps	(Gls)
1932–1933	Everton	0	(0)
1933–1934	Southport	0	(0)
1934–1935	Marine		
1935–1936	Liverpool	0	(0)
1936–1939	Cardiff City	31	(7)
1939	Hull City	0	(0)
1945–1946	Plymouth Argyle	0	(0)
- * Club domestic league appearances and goals

John Robert Prescott (1914–1989) was an English professional footballer who played as a winger. He was signed by several Football League clubs but only appeared for one, playing 31 times for Cardiff City.
