= Reg Pugh =

Welsh footballer (1914–1981)

Personal information
- Full name: Reginald Pugh
- Date of birth: 12 July 1914
- Place of birth: Aberaman, Wales
- Date of death: 21 October 1981 (aged 67)
- Place of death: Folkestone, Kent, England
- Height: 5 ft 5 in (1.65 m)
- Position: Outside right

Senior career*
Years	Team	Apps	(Gls)
–1934	Aberaman Athletic		
1934–1945	Cardiff City	166	(25)
1942	→ Brentford (guest)	1	(0)
- * Club domestic league appearances and goals

Reginald Pugh (12 July 1914 – 21 October 1981) was a Welsh professional footballer.

== Career ==
Born in Aberaman, near Aberdare, Mid Glamorgan in July 1914, Pugh began his career at his hometown club Aberaman Athletic before joining Cardiff City shortly after. He made his debut in October 1934 in a 3–1 win over Watford, becoming one of the club's youngest ever debutants at the age of 17. The following season, he was ever present in a side that struggled to avoid relegation. Following the outbreak of World War II, he played several times for the club in wartime fixtures before serving in Burma with the South Wales Borderers. At the end of the hostilities, he did not return to professional football. Pugh died in Folkestone, Kent in October 1981 at the age of 67.
