= George Nicholson (footballer) =

English footballer

Personal information
- Date of birth: 12 May 1905
- Place of birth: Pelaw, Gateshead, England
- Height: 5 ft 8 in (1.73 m)
- Position: Midfielder

Senior career*
Years	Team	Apps	(Gls)
1931–1936	Bolton Wanderers	67	(1)
1936–1939	Cardiff City	98	(0)
1939	Oldham Athletic	0	(0)
Total		165	(1)

Managerial career
- 1946–1947: Enschede
- * Club domestic league appearances and goals

George Nicholson (born 12 May 1905, date of death unknown) was an English professional footballer. He was born in Pelaw, Gateshead, County Durham.

== Career ==
Nicholson did not begin his professional football career until the relatively late age of twenty-five. He had been working as a miner while playing amateur football but in 1931 he was spotted by a scout from Bolton Wanderers. The scout had originally travelled to the match to watch another player but quickly moved to sign up Nicholson. He made his debut in a 2–2 draw with Liverpool in September 1931 and was a regular for the club until he was displaced by Harry Goslin. He spent time in the clubs reserves and jumped at the chance to play first team football again when he signed for Cardiff City in 1936. He was one of seven new signings made by the club in an attempt to steady the club which had been in decline for several years. He remained with the club for three years before signing for Oldham Athletic in 1939, however the outbreak of World War II soon after meant he never made an appearance for the club.

In 1946 he went to Enschede to coach Sportclub Enschede.
