= 1932–33 Cardiff City F.C. season =

Welsh football club season

Cardiff City
1932–33 season
- Chairman: Dr William Nicholson
- Manager: Fred Stewart
- Division Three South: 19th
- FA Cup: 1st round
- Welsh Cup: Semifinals
- Top goalscorer: League: Jimmy McCambridge (17); All: Jimmy McCambridge (18)
- Highest home attendance: 11,178 (v Gillingham, 26 December 1932)
- Lowest home attendance: 4,185 (v Brighton, 21 January 1933)
- Average home league attendance: 7,008
Home colours

The 1932–33 season was Cardiff City F.C.'s 14th season in the Football League. They competed in the 22-team Division Three South, then the third tier of English football, finishing 19th.

== Season review ==
=== Football League Third Division South ===
==== Partial league table ====
Pos	Team	Pld	W	D	L	GF	GA	GAv	Pts	Promotion
17	Aldershot	42	13	10	19	61	72	0.847	36	
18	Bournemouth & Boscombe Athletic	42	12	12	18	60	81	0.741	36	
19	Cardiff City	42	12	7	23	69	99	0.697	31	
20	Clapton Orient	42	8	13	21	59	93	0.634	29	
21	Newport County	42	11	7	24	61	105	0.581	29	Re-elected

=== Results by round ===
Round	1	2	3	4	5	6	7	8	9	10	11	12	13	14	15	16	17	18	19	20	21	22	23	24	25	26	27	28	29	30	31	32	33	34	35	36	37	38	39	40	41	42
Ground	A	H	H	A	A	H	A	H	A	H	H	A	H	A	H	H	H	A	H	A	H	A	A	H	A	H	A	H	A	A	H	A	H	A	H	A	H	A	A	H	A	H
Result	L	W	W	L	L	W	L	L	D	D	L	L	L	L	W	D	W	L	W	D	L	L	L	L	D	W	L	W	L	L	W	L	W	L	D	L	D	L	L	W	L	W
Position	~	~	7	8	16	8	15	19	19	17	19	20	20	21	21	20	20	21	19	19	21	20	21	21	21	20	20	20	20	20	20	20	19	19	19	19	19	19	21	19	19	19
Points	0	2	4	4	4	6	6	6	7	8	8	8	8	8	10	11	13	13	15	16	16	16	16	16	17	19	19	21	21	21	23	23	25	25	26	26	27	27	27	29	29	31

A = Away; H = Home; W = Win; D = Draw; L = Loss

== Players ==
First team squad. Note: Flags indicate national team as defined under FIFA eligibility rules; some limited exceptions apply. Players may hold more than one non-FIFA nationality.

No.	Pos.	Nation	Player
--	GK	ENG	Bob Adams
--	GK	WAL	Len Evans
--	GK	EIR	Tom Farquharson
--	DF	SCO	Jack Galbraith
--	DF	WAL	Eric Morris
--	DF	ENG	Bob Pollard
--	DF	WAL	Len Richards
--	DF	ENG	Bill Roberts
--	DF	ENG	George Russell
--	MF	WAL	Ernie Carless
--	MF	ENG	Frank Harris

No.	Pos.	Nation	Player
--	MF	WAL	Eddie Jenkins
--	MF	SCO	Peter Ronan
--	FW	ENG	Stan Cribb
--	FW	ENG	George Emmerson
--	FW	SCO	Jim Henderson
--	FW	WAL	Freddie Hill
--	FW	SCO	Les Jones
--	FW	ENG	Albert Keating
--	FW	ENG	Tom Maidment
--	FW	WAL	Tommy Paget
--	FW	SCO	Jim Tennant

== Fixtures and results ==
=== Third Division South ===
27 August 1932 1	Reading	4–2	Cardiff City	Reading
	Goal		Jimmy McCambridge; Stan Cribb	Stadium: Elm Park; Attendance: 13,867

29 August 1932 2	Cardiff City	3–0	Bournemouth	Cardiff
	Reg Keating; Stan Cribb; Les Jones			Stadium: Ninian Park; Attendance: 8,351

3 September 1932 3	Cardiff City	4–2	Norwich City	Cardiff
	Jimmy McCambridge; Jimmy McCambridge; George Emmerson; Stan Cribb		Goal	Stadium: Ninian Park; Attendance: 9,767

7 September 1932 4	Bournemouth	3–2	Cardiff City	Bournemouth
	Goal		Jimmy McCambridge; Jimmy McCambridge	Stadium: Dean Court; Attendance: 6,264

10 September 1932 5	Brighton & Hove Albion	1–0	Cardiff City	Brighton
	Goal			Stadium: Goldstone Ground; Attendance: 7,790

17 September 1932 6	Cardiff City	4–3	Bristol Rovers	Cardiff
	Jimmy McCambridge; Jimmy McCambridge; Stan Cribb; Reg Keating		Goal	Stadium: Ninian Park; Attendance: 9,104

24 September 1932 7	Aldershot	1–0	Cardiff City	Aldershot
	Goal			Stadium: Recreation Ground; Attendance: 7,172

1 October 1932 8	Cardiff City	2–5	Queens Park Rangers	Cardiff
	Les Jones; Les Jones		Ted Marcroft; Ted Marcroft; Ted Marcroft; Ted Goodier; Jack Blackman	Stadium: Ninian Park; Attendance: 7,842

8 October 1932 9	Southend United	2–2	Cardiff City	Southend
	Goal		Reg Keating; Jimmy McCambridge	Stadium: Roots Hall; Attendance: 3,590

15 October 1932 10	Cardiff City	1–1	Crystal Palace	Cardiff
	Jimmy McCambridge		Goal	Stadium: Ninian Park; Attendance: 7,144

22 October 1932 11	Cardiff City	1–3	Newport County	Cardiff
	Jimmy McCambridge		Billy Bagley; Billy Thomas; Frank Peed	Stadium: Ninian Park; Attendance: 10,163

29 October 1932 12	Luton Town	8–1	Cardiff City	Luton
	Tommy Tait (??); Davie Hutchison 45'; Arthur Mills (??); Arthur Nelson; Charlie Fraser	Luton report	Jimmy McCambridge	Stadium: Kenilworth Road; Attendance: 6,002; Referee: F Ratcliffe (Crouch End)

5 November 1932 13	Cardiff City	1–3	Exeter City	Cardiff
	George Emmerson		Goal	Stadium: Ninian Park; Attendance: 4,881

12 November 1932 14	Torquay United	4–1	Cardiff City	Torquay
	Don Bird; Fred Flavell; Fred Flavell; Ralph Birkett		Stan Cribb	Stadium: Plainmoor; Attendance: 3,911

19 November 1932 15	Cardiff City	2–1	Brentford	Cardiff
	Les Jones; Stan Cribb		Billy Scott	Stadium: Ninian Park; Attendance: 5,274

3 December 1932 16	Cardiff City	1–1	Bristol City	Cardiff
	Les Jones		Albert Keating	Stadium: Ninian Park; Attendance: 6,115

17 December 1932 17	Cardiff City	6–1	Clapton Orient	Cardiff
	Jimmy McCambridge; Jimmy McCambridge; Freddie Hill; Frank Harris; Les Jones; Stan Cribb		Goal	Stadium: Ninian Park; Attendance: 4,433

24 December 1932 18	Swindon Town	6–2	Cardiff City	Swindon
	Eddie Munnings; Eddie Munnings 50'; Eddie Munnings 65'; Ted Braithwaite 55'; Ted Dransfield 70' (pen.); Syd Brookes 85'		15' Jimmy McCambridge; 62' Jimmy McCambridge	Stadium: County Ground; Attendance: 6,145; Referee: AJ Brown

26 December 1932 19	Cardiff City	1–0	Gillingham	Cardiff
	Les Jones			Stadium: Ninian Park; Attendance: 11,178

27 December 1932 20	Gillingham	1–1	Cardiff City	Gillingham
	Goal		Les Jones	Stadium: Priestfield Stadium; Attendance: 10,449

31 December 1932 21	Cardiff City	0–1	Reading	Cardiff
			Goal	Stadium: Ninian Park; Attendance: 6,773

7 January 1933 22	Norwich City	3–1	Cardiff City	Norwich
	Goal		(pen.) Les Jones	Stadium: Carrow Road; Attendance: 9,486

14 January 1933 23	Coventry City	5–0	Cardiff City	Coventry
	Goal			Stadium: Highfield Road; Attendance: 9,752

21 January 1933 24	Cardiff City	1–2	Brighton & Hove Albion	Cardiff
	Jimmy McCambridge		Goal	Stadium: Ninian Park; Attendance: 4,185

28 January 1933 25	Bristol Rovers	0–0	Cardiff City	Bristol
				Stadium: Eastville; Attendance: 6,249

4 February 1933 26	Cardiff City	2–1	Aldershot	Cardiff
	Tom Maidment; Jim Henderson		Goal	Stadium: Ninian Park; Attendance: 4,287

11 February 1933 27	Queens Park Rangers	5–1	Cardiff City	London
	George Rounce; George Rounce; George Goddard; George Goddard; Jimmy Collins		Tom Maidment	Stadium: White City Stadium; Attendance: 5,347

18 February 1933 28	Cardiff City	2–0	Southend United	Cardiff
	Les Jones; Les Jones			Stadium: Ninian Park; Attendance: 5,275

25 February 1933 29	Crystal Palace	4–1	Cardiff City	London
	Goal		Tom Maidment	Stadium: Selhurst Park; Attendance: 5,805

4 March 1933 30	Newport County	4–2	Cardiff City	Newport
	Jimmy Gardner; Jimmy Gardner; Billy Bagley; Tommy Green		George Emmerson; Tom Maidment	Stadium: Somerton Park; Attendance: 7,933

11 March 1933 31	Cardiff City	3–2	Luton Town	Cardiff
	Les Jones 14'; Stan Cribb (pen.); Tom Maidment	Luton report	13' Arthur Mills; 35' Tommy Tait	Stadium: Ninian Park; Attendance: 5,919; Referee: AJ Brown (Bristol)

18 March 1933 32	Exeter City	1–0	Cardiff City	Exeter
	Goal			Stadium: St James Park; Attendance: 8,146

25 March 1933 33	Cardiff City	2–1	Torquay United	Cardiff
	Jim Henderson; Jim Henderson		Albert Hutchinson	Stadium: Ninian Park; Attendance: 6,630

1 April 1933 34	Brentford	7–3	Cardiff City	London
	Ernest Muttitt; Jack Holliday; Jack Holliday; Jack Holliday; Jack Holliday (pen.); Arthur Crompton; Arthur Crompton		Jim Henderson; Jim Henderson; Jim Henderson	Stadium: Griffin Park; Attendance: 10,831

8 April 1933 35	Cardiff City	2–2	Coventry City	Cardiff
	Jimmy McCambridge; Jim Henderson		Goal	Stadium: Ninian Park; Attendance: 5,902

10 April 1933 36	Northampton Town	2–0	Cardiff City	Northampton
	Goal			Stadium: County Ground; Attendance: 2,302

14 April 1933 37	Cardiff City	1–1	Watford	Cardiff
	Tom Maidment		Goal	Stadium: Ninian Park; Attendance: 9,451

15 April 1933 38	Bristol City	3–1	Cardiff City	Bristol
	Ted Bowen; Ted Bowen; Ted Bowen		George Russell	Stadium: Ashton Gate; Attendance: 7,176

17 April 1933 39	Watford	2–1	Cardiff City	Watford
	Goal		Les Jones	Stadium: Vicarage Road; Attendance: 7,713

22 April 1933 40	Cardiff City	6–0	Northampton Town	Cardiff
	Jim Henderson; Jim Henderson; Jim Henderson; Jim Henderson; Jim Henderson; Stan Cribb			Stadium: Ninian Park; Attendance: 6,631

29 April 1933 41	Clapton Orient	3–0	Cardiff City	London
	Goal			Stadium: Brisbane Road; Attendance: 3,739

6 May 1933 42	Cardiff City	3–0	Swindon Town	Cardiff
	Stan Cribb; Stan Cribb; Tom Maidment 24'			Stadium: Ninian Park; Attendance: 7,871; Referee: AJ Brown

=== FA Cup ===
26 November 1932 Round 1	Cardiff City	1–1	Bristol Rovers	Cardiff
	Frank Harris		Goal	Stadium: Ninian Park; Attendance: 11,000

30 November 1932 Round 1 (Replay)	Bristol Rovers	4–1	Cardiff City	Bristol
	Goal		Jimmy McCambridge	Stadium: Eastville; Attendance: 9,000

=== Welsh Cup ===
22 February 1933 Round 7	Cardiff City	4–2	Tranmere Rovers	Cardiff
	Les Jones; Les Jones; Jim Henderson; Jim Henderson		Goal	Stadium: Ninian Park; Attendance: 4,000

9 March 1933 Round 8	Swansea Town	1–1	Cardiff City	Swansea
	Hugh Blair		30' Tom Maidment	Stadium: Vetch Field; Attendance: 3,000

15 March 1933 Round 8 (Replay)	Cardiff City	2–1 (a.e.t.)	Swansea Town	Cardiff
	Tom Maidment 11'; Les Jones 95'		Ted Martin	Stadium: Ninian Park; Attendance: 5,000

5 April 1933 Semifinal	Chester City	2–1	Cardiff City	Chester
	Goal		Jim Henderson	Stadium: Sealand Road; Attendance: 10,000
