= 1931–32 Cardiff City F.C. season =

Welsh football club season

Cardiff City
1931–32 season
- Chairman: Walter Riden
- Manager: Fred Stewart
- Division Three South: 9th
- FA Cup: Third round
- Welsh Cup: Sixth round
- Top goalscorer: League: Jimmy McCambridge (26); All: Jimmy McCambridge (28)
- Highest home attendance: 13,515 (v Luton Town, 26 December 1931)
- Lowest home attendance: 3,491 (v QPR, 14 November 1931)
- Average home league attendance: 7,684
Home colours

The 1931–32 season was the 31st season of competitive football played by Cardiff City F.C. It was the team's first season in the Third Division South of the Football League since being relegated from the Second Division during the previous season.

== Background ==
Cardiff City played the 1931–32 season in the Third Division South of the Football League. It was the team's first season in the bottom tier of the Football League since they had joined the organisation for the 1920–21 season. The side had suffered relegation from the Second Division during the 1930–31 season after finishing bottom of the league.

Following a second relegation in three years, the club released a number of players. The most prominent of these were long-serving trio Fred Keenor, Len Davies and Harry Wake. Albert Keating was also due to be released following a doctor's report on a knee injury he had sustained, but was eventually retained for the campaign. Stewart made several new signings for the season, with Peter Ronan, Stan Holt, Owen McNally and Harry O'Neill all arriving ahead of the new campaign.

== Third Division South ==
Cardiff began the season with a 1–0 defeat to Northampton Town on 29 August 1932 with Stewart handing debuts to four players. One of the debutants, O'Neill scored Cardiff's first goal of the campaign in the following match, a 1–1 draw against Brighton & Hove Albion two days later. Walter Robbins, the previous season's top goalscorer, netted his first goals of the campaign with a hat-trick during a 5–1 victory over Reading to open September; Jimmy McCambridge and Leslie Jones were also on the scoresheet as Cardiff recorded their first win.

=== Partial league table ===
Pos	Team	Pld	W	D	L	GF	GA	GAv	Pts
7	Exeter City	42	20	7	15	77	62	1.242	47
8	Brighton & Hove Albion	42	17	12	13	73	58	1.259	46
9	Cardiff City	42	19	8	15	87	73	1.192	46
10	Norwich City	42	17	12	13	76	67	1.134	46
11	Watford	42	19	8	15	81	79	1.025	46

=== Results by round ===
Round	1	2	3	4	5	6	7	8	9	10	11	12	13	14	15	16	17	18	19	20	21	22	23	24	25	26	27	28	29	30	31	32	33	34	35	36	37	38	39	40	41	42
Ground	A	H	H	A	A	H	H	A	H	A	H	A	H	A	H	A	A	A	A	H	H	H	A	H	A	H	A	H	A	H	A	H	A	A	H	H	A	H	H	A	H	A
Result	L	D	W	L	D	W	L	W	W	L	W	L	L	L	L	D	D	L	L	W	W	W	L	L	L	W	W	W	W	W	L	D	D	W	W	W	D	W	W	W	L	D
Position	~	~	8	12	13	6	11	8	8	12	10	12	13	13	14	14	15	18	18	17	16	14	15	16	19	16	15	13	13	13	13	13	13	12	12	11	11	10	8	8	10	9
Points	0	1	3	3	4	6	6	8	10	10	12	12	12	12	12	13	14	14	14	16	18	20	20	20	20	22	24	26	28	30	30	31	32	34	36	38	39	41	43	45	45	46

A = Away; H = Home; W = Win; D = Draw; L = Loss

== Fixtures and results ==
=== Third Division South ===
29 August 1931 1	Northampton Town	1–0	Cardiff City	Northampton
	Goal			Stadium: County Ground; Attendance: 13,448

31 August 1931 2	Cardiff City	1–1	Brighton & Hove Albion	Cardiff
	Harry O'Neill		Goal	Stadium: Ninian Park; Attendance: 10,435

5 September 1931 3	Cardiff City	5–1	Reading	Cardiff
	Les Jones; Walter Robbins; Walter Robbins; Walter Robbins; Jimmy McCambridge		Goal	Stadium: Ninian Park; Attendance: 9,562

7 September 1931 4	Coventry City	2–1	Cardiff City	Coventry
	Goal		Jimmy McCambridge	Stadium: Highfield Road; Attendance: 11,648

12 September 1931 5	Southend United	1–1	Cardiff City	Southend
	Goal		(o.g.) Jack French	Stadium: Roots Hall; Attendance: 7,494

14 September 1931 6	Cardiff City	6–1	Coventry City	Cardiff
	Albert Keating; Albert Keating; Walter Robbins; Walter Robbins; Les Jones; Jimmy McCambridge		Goal	Stadium: Ninian Park; Attendance: 7,105

19 September 1931 7	Cardiff City	0–3	Fulham	Cardiff
			Goal	Stadium: Ninian Park; Attendance: 13,233

26 September 1931 8	Thames	1–2	Cardiff City	London
	Goal		Albert Keating; Jimmy McCambridge	Stadium: West Ham Stadium; Attendance: 3,538

3 October 1931 9	Cardiff City	3–2	Brentford	Cardiff
	George Emmerson; Albert Keating; Walter Robbins		Jackie Burns; Billy Lane	Stadium: Ninian Park; Attendance: 9,521

10 October 1931 10	Exeter City	3–1	Cardiff City	Exeter
	Goal		George Emmerson	Stadium: St James Park; Attendance: 8,160

17 October 1931 11	Cardiff City	2–0	Mansfield Town	Cardiff
	George Emmerson; Walter Robbins			Stadium: Ninian Park; Attendance: 7,688

24 October 1931 12	Watford	3–0	Cardiff City	Watford
	Goal			Stadium: Vicarage Road; Attendance: 11,526

31 October 1931 13	Cardiff City	1–3	Crystal Palace	Cardiff
	George Emmerson		Goal	Stadium: Ninian Park; Attendance: 6,757

7 November 1931 14	Bournemouth	3–0	Cardiff City	Bournemouth
	Goal			Stadium: Dean Court; Attendance: 6,562

14 November 1931 15	Cardiff City	0–4	Queens Park Rangers	Cardiff
			Goal	Stadium: Ninian Park; Attendance: 3,491

21 November 1931 16	Bristol Rovers	2–2	Cardiff City	Bristol
	Goal		Harry O'Neill (pen.) Peter Ronan	Stadium: Eastville; Attendance: 9,047

5 December 1931 17	Clapton Orient	1–1	Cardiff City	London
	Goal		Albert Keating	Stadium: Brisbane Road; Attendance: 6,524

19 December 1931 18	Norwich City	2–0	Cardiff City	Norwich
	Goal			Stadium: Carrow Road; Attendance: 7,904

25 December 1931 19	Luton Town	2–1	Cardiff City	Luton
	Tommy Tait (??), 40'	Luton report	Albert Keating	Stadium: Kenilworth Road; Attendance: 11,609; Referee: WE Russell (Swindon)

26 December 1931 20	Cardiff City	4–1	Luton Town	Cardiff
14:30	Walter Robbins (??); Albert Keating 47'; Jimmy McCambridge	Luton report	Jimmy Yardley	Stadium: Ninian Park; Attendance: 13,515; Referee: WE Russell (Swindon)

2 January 1932 21	Cardiff City	5–0	Northampton Town	Cardiff
14:30	Jimmy McCambridge; Jimmy McCambridge; Frank Harris; Walter Robbins; George Emmerson			Stadium: Ninian Park; Attendance: 3,917

13 January 1932 22	Cardiff City	5–2	Torquay United	Cardiff
	George Emmerson; George Emmerson; Jimmy McCambridge; Albert Keating; Walter Robbins		Jack Fowler; Cyril Hemingway	Stadium: Ninian Park; Attendance: 3,890

16 January 1932 23	Reading	5–1	Cardiff City	Reading
	Goal		Jimmy McCambridge	Stadium: Elm Park; Attendance: 7,065

23 January 1932 24	Cardiff City	2–3	Southend United	Cardiff
	Walter Robbins; Jack French (o.g.)		Goal	Stadium: Ninian Park; Attendance: 6,831

30 January 1932 25	Fulham	4–0	Cardiff City	London
	Goal			Stadium: Craven Cottage; Attendance: 14,690

6 February 1932 26	Cardiff City	9–2	Thames	Cardiff
	Walter Robbins; Walter Robbins; Walter Robbins; Walter Robbins; Walter Robbins; Jimmy McCambridge; Les Jones; Albert Keating; George Emmerson		Goal	Stadium: Ninian Park; Attendance: 6,698

13 February 1932 27	Brentford	2–3	Cardiff City	London
	Arthur Crompton; Vivian Gibbins		Jimmy McCambridge; Albert Keating; Walter Robbins	Stadium: Griffin Park; Attendance: 16,239

20 February 1932 28	Cardiff City	5–3	Exeter City	Cardiff
	Walter Robbins; Walter Robbins; George Emmerson; Jimmy McCambridge; Les Jones		Goal	Stadium: Ninian Park; Attendance: 8,817

27 February 1932 29	Mansfield Town	1–2	Cardiff City	Mansfield
	Harry Johnson		Jimmy McCambridge; Jimmy McCambridge	Stadium: Field Mill; Attendance: 8,316

5 March 1932 30	Cardiff City	2–1	Watford	Cardiff
	Walter Robbins; Les Jones		Goal	Stadium: Ninian Park; Attendance: 10,019

12 March 1932 31	Crystal Palace	5–0	Cardiff City	London
	Goal			Stadium: Selhurst Park; Attendance: 13,206

19 March 1932 32	Cardiff City	0–0	Bournemouth	Cardiff
				Stadium: Ninian Park; Attendance: 6,863

25 March 1932 33	Gillingham	1–1	Cardiff City	Gillingham
	Goal		Albert Keating	Stadium: Priestfield Stadium; Attendance: 8,015

26 March 1932 34	Queens Park Rangers	2–3	Cardiff City	London
	Goal		Jimmy McCambridge; Jimmy McCambridge; Jimmy McCambridge	Stadium: Loftus Road; Attendance: 8,324

28 March 1932 35	Cardiff City	1–0	Gillingham	Cardiff
	Jimmy McCambridge			Stadium: Ninian Park; Attendance: 10,455

2 April 1932 36	Cardiff City	3–1	Bristol Rovers	Cardiff
	Jimmy McCambridge; Albert Keating; Albert Keating		Goal	Stadium: Ninian Park; Attendance: 6,773

9 April 1932 37	Torquay United	2–2	Cardiff City	Torquay
	Billy Clayson; Billy Clayson		Jimmy McCambridge; Jimmy McCambridge	Stadium: Plainmoor; Attendance: 3,437

13 April 1932 38	Cardiff City	3–0	Swindon Town	Cardiff
	Albert Keating; Albert Keating; George Emmerson			Stadium: Ninian Park; Attendance: 4,018

16 April 1932 39	Cardiff City	5–0	Clapton Orient	Cardiff
	Jimmy McCambridge; Jimmy McCambridge; Jimmy McCambridge; Albert Keating; Albert Keating			Stadium: Ninian Park; Attendance: 5,290

23 April 1932 40	Swindon Town	1–4	Cardiff City	Swindon
	Harry Morris 35'		12' Albert Keating; 18' Albert Keating; 42' Jimmy McCambridge; 75' Jimmy McCambridge	Stadium: County Ground; Attendance: 3,728; Referee: T Botham

30 April 1932 41	Cardiff City	0–2	Norwich City	Cardiff
			Goal	Stadium: Ninian Park; Attendance: 6,487

7 May 1932 42	Brighton & Hove Albion	0–0	Cardiff City	Brighton
				Stadium: Goldstone Ground; Attendance: 5,447

=== FA Cup ===
28 November 1931 Round 1	Cardiff City	8–0	Enfield	Cardiff
	Reg Keating; Reg Keating; Reg Keating; Harry O'Neill; Harry O'Neill; George Emmerson; George Emmerson; Frank Harris			Stadium: Ninian Park; Attendance: 6,321

12 December 1931 Round 2	Cardiff City	4–0	Clapton Orient	Cardiff
	Jimmy McCambridge; Reg Keating; George Emmerson; Billy Broadbent (o.g.)			Stadium: Ninian Park; Attendance: 10,500

9 January 1932 Round 3	Bradford (Park Avenue)	3–0	Cardiff City	Bradford
	Goal			Stadium: Park Avenue (stadium); Attendance: 18,343

=== Welsh Cup ===
8 February 1932 Round 5	Llanelli	3–5	Cardiff City	Llanelli
	Goal		Walter Robbins; Walter Robbins; Walter Robbins; Jimmy McCambridge; Jimmy McCambridge	Stadium: Stebonheath Park; Attendance: 5,000

2 March 1932 Round 6	Chester City	2–1	Cardiff City	Chester
	Goal		George Emmerson	Stadium: Sealand Road; Attendance: 5,000
