= 1932–33 Queens Park Rangers F.C. season =

English football club season

Queens Park Rangers
1932–33 season
- Chairman: Charles W Fielding
- Manager: Archie Mitchell
- Stadium: White City Stadium
- Football League Third Division South: 16th
- FA Cup: 3rd Round
- Top goalscorer: League: Dick Brown 13; All: George Goddard, George Rounce 14
- Highest home attendance: 24,381 (Sat 27 August 1932) Vs Brentford
- Lowest home attendance: 2,837 (Sat 22 April 1933) Vs Luton Town
- Average home league attendance: 7,602
- Biggest win: 6–1 (Sat 3 December 1932) Vs Newport County, (Sat 7 January 1933) Vs Southend United
- Biggest defeat: 0–7 (Sat 4 March 1933) Vs Coventry City
Home colours	Away colours

The 1932–33 Queens Park Rangers season was the club's 42nd season of existence and their 13th season in the Football League Third Division. QPR finished 16th in the league, and were eliminated in the third round of the FA Cup. This was the club's second and final season at White City Stadium.

== League standings ==
Pos	Team	Pld	W	D	L	GF	GA	GAv	Pts
14	Luton Town	42	13	13	16	78	78	1.000	39
15	Bristol City	42	12	13	17	83	90	0.922	37
16	Queens Park Rangers	42	13	11	18	72	87	0.828	37
17	Aldershot	42	13	10	19	61	72	0.847	36
18	Bournemouth & Boscombe Athletic	42	12	12	18	60	81	0.741	36

=== Results ===
QPR scores given first

Win Draw Loss

=== Third Division South ===
Date	Venue	Opponent	Result	Score F–A	Scorers	Attendance	Position
Sat 27 August 1932	H	Brentford	L	2–3	Goddard, Brown	24,381	14
Thu 1 September 1932	H	Aldershot	D	2–2	Goddard, Rounce	5,998	18
Sat 3 September 1932	A	Southend United	W	1–0	Rounce	7,408	11
Wed 7 September 1932	A	Aldershot	L	0–2		4,924	17
Sat 10 September 1932	H	Crystal Palace	W	2–1	Wiles, Blackman	15,955	13
Sat 17 September 1932	A	Gillingham	L	1–5	Brown	7,375	16
Sat 24 September 1932	H	Watford	W	2–1	Brown, Marcroft	10,653	14
Sat 1 October 1932	A	Cardiff City	W	5–2	Marcroft 3, Goodier, Blackman	7,842	9
Sat 8 October 1932	H	Reading	L	0–3		11,250	11
Sat 15 October 1932	A	Norwich City	L	2–3	Marcroft, Goddard	9,457	14
Sat 22 October 1932	H	Coventry City	D	3–3	Gofton, Collins, Brown	7,612	15
Sat 29 October 1932	A	Bristol City	W	3–2	Gofton. Brown 2	7,126	13
Sat 5 November 1932	H	Northampton Town	D	1–1	Gofton	8,895	12
Sat 12 November 1932	A	Leyton Orient	D	2–2	Howe, Gofton	6,110	12
Sat 19 November 1932	H	Swindon Town	W	4–1	Goddard 2, Gofton 2	5,802	7
Sat 3 December 1932	H	Newport County	W	6–1	Gofton 2, Brown 2, Marcroft, Rounce	6,514	7
10 December 1932	A	Luton Town		PP			
Sat 17 December 1932	H	Exeter City	L	1–3	Rounce	7,485	10
Sat 24 December 1932	A	Torquay United	L	1–3	Goddard	2,825	10
Mon 26 December 1932	H	Brighton and Hove Albion	L	0–1		9,177	14
Tue 27 December 1932	A	Brighton and Hove Albion	L	1–4	Brown	14,544	17
Sat 31 December 1932	A	Brentford	L	0–2		14,981	17
Sat 7 January 1933	H	Southend United	W	6–1	Goddard 2, Brown 2, Blackman, OG	5,588	17
14 January 1933	A	Bournemouth & Boscombe		pp			
Wed 18 January 1933	A	Bournemouth and Boscombe Athletic	L	0–3		2,645	17
Sat 21 January 1933	A	Crystal Palace	W	1–0	Rounce	8,157	14
Sat 28 January 1933	H	Gillingham	D	1–1	Wiles	4,169	14
Sat 4 February 1933	A	Watford	D	2–2	Howe, Rounce	6,055	14
Sat 11 February 1933	H	Cardiff City	W	5–1	Goddard 2, Rounce 2, Collins	5,347	11
Sat 18 February 1933	A	Reading	L	1–3	Goddard	7,606	13
Sat 25 February 1933	H	Norwich City	D	2–2	Goodier, Howe	4,586	13
Sat 4 March 1933	A	Coventry City	L	0–7		12,312	15
Sat 11 March 1933	H	Bristol City	D	1–1	Blackman	6,342	15
Sat 18 March 1933	A	Northampton Town	L	1–3	Brown	5,293	16
Sat 25 March 1933	H	Leyton Orient	W	2–1	Howe, Blackman	5,320	14
Sat 1 April 1933	A	Swindon Town	D	0–0		3,848	16
Sat 8 April 1933	H	Bournemouth and Boscombe Athletic	W	3–1	Hill, Blackman, Jones	4,176	14
Fri 14 April 1933	H	Bristol Rovers	D	1–1	Blackman	6,683	14
Sat 15 April 1933	A	Newport County	L	1–5	Marcroft	4,120	14
Mon 17 April 1933	A	Bristol Rovers	L	1–4	Brown	7,550	15
Tue 18 April 1933	A	Luton Town	L	1–3	Blackman	2,402	15
Sat 22 April 1933	H	Luton Town	W	3–1	Blackman 2, Marcroft	2,837	15
Sat 29 April 1933	A	Exeter City	L	0–2		3,358	16
Sat 6 May 1933	H	Torquay United	D	1–1	Blackman	3,079	16

=== FA Cup ===
Round	Date	Venue	Opponent	Result	Score F–A	Scorers	Attendance
First round	26 November 1932	A	Merthyr Town (Southern League)	D	1–1	Rounce	6,500
First round replay	Thu 1 December 1932	H	Merthyr Town (Southern League)	W	5–1	Goddard 3, Marcroft, Rounce	6,000
Second round	Sat 10 December 1932	A	Torquay United (Third Division South)	D	1–1	Rounce	5,000
Second round replay	Thu 15 December 1932	H	Torquay United (Third Division South)	W	3–1	Rounce 3	7,100
Third round	Sat 14 January 1933	A	Darlington (Third Division North)	L	0–2		7,639

=== London Challenge Cup ===
Round	Date	Venue	Opponent	Result	Score F–A	Scorers
First round	10 October 1932	H	Chelsea	W	2–1	Griffiths (og), Brown
Second round	24 October 1932	A	Fulham	W	3–2	Blackman 2, Jones
Semi-final	14 November 1932	H	Arsenal	W	1–0	unknown
Final	8 May 1933	N	West Ham	W	3–0	Jones, Blackman, March

=== Friendlies ===
13 August 1932	Hoops v Reds (H)	H	
20 August 1932	Possibles v Probables (H)	H	
30 January 1933	First Vienna	h	Friendly

== Squad ==
Position	Nationality	Name	Third Division South		FA Cup		Total	
Position	Nationality	Name	Apps	Goals	Apps	Goals	Apps	Goals
GK	ENG	Ernie Beecham	42		5		47	
DF	ENG	Don Ashman	15				15	
DF	ENG	Leslie Adlam	28		4		32	
DF	ENG	Jimmy Armstrong	31		5		36	
DF	ENG	Ernie Hall	26		5		31	
DF	ENG	Joseph Hill	15	1	1		16	1
DF	ENG	John Jobson	4				4	
DF	ENG	Tom Nixon	5				5	
DF	ENG	Sidney Russell	8				8	
DF	SCO	Walter Barrie	36		5		41	
DF	ENG	Ted Goodier	41	2	4		45	2
MF	ENG	Dicky March	9		1		10	
MF	ENG	Ted Marcroft	29	8	4	1	33	9
MF	ENG	Harry Wiles	9	2	1		10	2
FW	ENG	Jack Blackman	23	11	1		24	11
FW	ENG	George Goddard	30	11	5	3	35	14
FW	ENG	Dick Brown	36	13	5		41	13
FW	WAL	Charlie Jones	13	1			13	1
FW	ENG	George Rounce	24	8	5	6	29	14
FW	ENG	James Collins	11	2			11	2
FW	ENG	George Gofton	7	8	4		11	8
FW	ENG	Harold Howe	20	4			20	4

== Transfers in ==
Name	from	Date	Fee
Ernie Beecham	Fulham	1932	
Tommy Dutton	Leicester City	1932	
Dick Brown	Blythe Spartans	1932	
Charlie Jones	North End	1932	
Edward Marcroft	Middlesbrough	1932	
Dilling, A		1932	
Brown, Dick	Blyth Spartans	2 July 1932	
Hill, Joe	Barnsley	19 July 1932	
Gerry Keizer	Charlton	26 July 1932	
O'Connor, Peter *	Coleraine	3 October 1932	
Bartlett, Fred	Maidenhead U	7 October 1932	
McCrorie, Tom	Pawtucket Rangers (USA)	22 November 1932	
Russell, Sid	Tunbridge Wells	8 December 1932	£150
Bailey, John	Dartford	24 December 1932	
Joe Devine	Sunderland	25 May 1933	£2,500
George Emmerson	Cardiff City	12 June 1933	Ted Marcroft

== Transfers out ==
Name	from	Date	Fee	Date	To	Fee
Halton, R *		1931		32		
Stephenson, Bert	Walthamstow Avenue	14 March 1929		32		
Jim Lewis	Walthamstow Avenue	30 September 1929		32	Walthamstow Avenue	
Brunning, Arthur *		11 September 1930		32		
Norman Smith	Sheffield W	15 August 1930	£300	July 32	Kreuzlingen (Swi)	£300
Billy Coward	Windsor & Eton	28 January 1928		July 32	Walsall	
Lewis, Dudley *	Bath City	1 June 1929		July 32	Bristol R	
Wally Tutt	Canterbury Waverley	8 September 1930		July 32	Canterbury Waverley	
Stan Cribb	West Ham	8 June 1931		July 32	Cardiff	£250
Bernard Harris	Luton	22 June 1929		July 32	Llanelly	
Bob Pollard	Exeter	23 August 1929		July 32	Cardiff	
Arthur Sales	Chelsea	9 May 1930		Aug 32	Bournemouth	
Carwin, W		1931		Aug 32	Jarrow	
Morton, William	Craghead U	13 July 1931		Aug 32	Ashington	
George Wiles	Sittingbourne	30 April 1929		Sep 32	Bristol C	
O'Connor, Peter *	Coleraine	3 October 1932		Dec 32	Coleraine	
James Collins	Tooting & Mitcham United	1931		1933	Tunbridge Wells Rangers	
George Gofton	Newcastle	1932		1933		
Ernie Hall	Bedworth town	1931		1933	Chester	
Joseph Hill	Barnsley	1932		1933	Stockport	
Harold Howe	Watford	1929		1933	Crystal Palace	
John Jobson	Stockport	1932		1933	Gateshead	
Harry Wiles	SittingBourne	1929		1933	Walsall	
Gerry Keizer	Charlton	26 July 1932		1933	Ajax (Hol)	
Dilling, A		1932		1933	Sutton United	
McCrorie, Tom	Pawtucket Rangers (USA)	22 November 1932		Jan 33	Coleraine	
Whatmore, Ernie	Bristol R	9 June 1928		Feb 33	Shepherd's Bush	
George Rounce	Grays	7 February 1928		1 March 1933	Fulham	£500
Jimmy Armstrong	Clapton Orient	1928		May 1933	Watford	Free
Howe, Harold	Watford	6 September 1929		May 1933	Crystal P	
Ted Marcroft	Middlesbrough	May 1932		12 June 1933	Cardiff City	George Emmerson
