= Jobson =

Jobson is a surname. Notable people with the surname include:

- Alexander Jobson (1875–1933), Australian Army Brigadier General
- Eddie Jobson (born 1955), English musician
- Edward Jobson (cricketer) (1855–1909), English cricketer
- Edward Jobson (actor)
- Francis Jobson, MP for Colchester
- Frederick James Jobson (1812–1881), painter, architect and Wesleyan Methodist minister
- Gary Jobson, Australian sailor
- Georgia May Jobson, American temperance reformer
- Glen Jobson (1930–2024), Australian field hockey player
- Isabella Jobson (1878–1943), Australian nurse who served in World War I
- Jack Jobson (footballer) (1900–1983), English footballer
- Jasmine Jobson (born 1995), English actress
- Jobson Kleison da Silva Costa (born 1974), Brazilian footballer
- Jóbson Leandro Pereira de Oliveira (born 1988), Brazilian footballer
- Jobson Sousa Santos (born 1995), Brazilian footballer
- Liesl Jobson, South African poet and musician
- Marci Jobson (born 1975), American soccer player
- Matt Jobson (born 1980), Australian rugby league player
- Nancy Jobson (1880–1964), Australian teacher and headmistress
- Richard Jobson (explorer), seventeenth-century English explorer
- Richard Jobson (footballer) (born 1963), English
- Richard Jobson (television presenter) (born 1960), Scottish singer-songwriter and film-maker, best known as a TV presenter
- Robert Jobson, British journalist, author and broadcaster
- Walter Jobson, MP
- Wayne Jobson (born 1954), Jamaican record producer
