= Maidment =

Maidment is an English-language surname. Notable people with the name include:

- Ben Maidment (born 1988), English rugby union player
- Charlie Maidment (1844–1926), British jockey
- Colin Hyde Maidment (1908–1955), Irish badminton player and official
- Cyril Maidment (1929–2004), British speedway rider
- Dai Maidment, Welsh rugby league player
- Harold Maidment (1906–1977), British sprint canoer
- James Maidment (1793–1879), British antiquary and collector
- Jane Maidment, New Zealand professor of social work
- Jimmy Maidment (1901–1977), English footballer
- Susannah Maidment, British palaeontologist
- Tom Maidment (1905–1971), English footballer
