= William Bagley =

William Bagley may refer to:

- William Bagley (educator) (1874–1946), American educator and editor
- William Bagley (footballer) (1909–?), English footballer
- William Henry Bagley (1833–1886), American military officer, politician, and newspaperman
