= Percy Richards =

Percy Richards may refer to:

- Percy Richards (English footballer)
- Percy Richards (Welsh footballer)
