= Edward Braithwaite =

Edward Braithwaite may refer to:

- Edward Braithwaite (footballer) (1902–1990), English professional footballer
- Edward R. Braithwaite (1912–2016), Guyanese novelist
