= Marcroft =

Marcroft is a surname. Notable people with the surname include:

- Jenny Marcroft (born 1963), New Zealand politician
- Ted Marcroft (1910–1975), English footballer
