= Edward Jobson =

Edward Jobson may refer to:

- Edward Jobson (cricketer)
- Edward Jobson (actor)
