= Keith Graydon =

Irish footballer

Personal information
- Full name: Keith Graydon
- Date of birth: 10 February 1983 (age 43)
- Place of birth: Dublin, Ireland
- Height: 5 ft 11 in (1.80 m)
- Positions: Midfielder; striker

Team information
- Current team: Morpeth Town

Youth career
- ?–2000: Home Farm
- 2000–2003: Sunderland

Senior career*
Years	Team	Apps	(Gls)
2003	Sunderland	0	(0)
2003	→ York City (loan)	7	(1)
2003–2004	Scarborough	1	(0)
2004	Blyth Spartans		
2004–2005	Spennymoor United		
2005	Washington Nissan		
2005	Dunston Federation		
2005–2006	Gateshead	21	(1)
2006–2008	Durham City		
2008	Sunderland RCA		
2008	Jarrow Roofing		
2008–2009	Newcastle Blue Star		
2009	Durham City		
2009–2014	Spennymoor Town		
2014–2019	Morpeth Town	116	(16)
2019-	Newcastle Blue Star		

International career^{‡}
	Republic of Ireland U16	?	(?)
	Republic of Ireland U18	?	(?)
	Republic of Ireland U20	?	(?)
- * Club domestic league appearances and goals as of 22:14, 25 January 2018 (UTC) ‡ National team caps and goals as of 02:17, 12 November 2012 (UTC)

Keith Graydon (born 10 February 1983) is an Irish footballer who plays for Morpeth Town as a midfielder and a striker.

== Club career ==
Born in Dublin, County Dublin, Graydon was a member of the Home Farm youth system before joining English club Sunderland on a professional contract on 28 February 2000. He joined Third Division side York City on a one-month loan on 27 March 2003. His debut came on 29 March 2003 after starting York's 2–0 defeat at home to Southend United. In the following game, a 2–2 home draw with Rochdale on 12 April 2003, Graydon scored his first and only goal for York with a 35th minute penalty kick. Graydon finished the loan spell at York with one goal in seven appearances, and in May 2003 he was released from his Sunderland contract.

Graydon went on trial with Football Conference side Scarborough before signing on non-contract terms on 25 September 2003. He signed a contract for the rest of the 2003–04 season the following month and made his debut for the club as an 82nd-minute substitute in a 2–1 home win over Port Vale in the Football League Trophy on 14 October 2003. Having made four appearances for Scarborough, Graydon signed for Northern Premier League Premier Division outfit Blyth Spartans on 29 March 2004. He left for league rivals Spennymoor United in September 2004.

Having joined Washington Nissan in April 2005, Graydon signed for Dunston Federation in July. He signed for Northern Premier League Premier Division club Gateshead in October 2005, making his debut on 22 October in a 3–2 home win over Ashton United. He finished the 2005–06 season with 24 appearances before leaving Gateshead for Durham City in the summer of 2006. He scored seven Northern League Division One goals in the 2007–08 season before joining Sunderland RCA in the summer of 2008, where he was made captain.

Graydon signed for Sunderland RCA's Northern League rivals Jarrow Roofing in October 2008. However, during the following month he signed for Northern Premier League Division One North outfit Newcastle Blue Star. Graydon re-signed for Durham in March 2009, with manager Lee Collings praising his impact at the club, saying "We've hopefully come out of a little blip and re-signing Keith Graydon has made a big difference. He ran the show against Radcliffe". He left for Spennymoor Town in the summer of 2009 and scored 12 goals in the Northern League Division One in the 2009–10 season. Graydon scored the winning goal for Spennymoor in the 2013 FA Vase Final at Wembley Stadium on 4 May 2013 with a powerful shot from eight yards 10 minutes from full-time, as the side beat Tunbridge Wells 2–1. In November 2014 he signed for Morpeth Town, who he captained to another FA Vase win in 2015–16.

== International career ==
Graydon was capped by the Republic of Ireland under-16s and under-18s before playing for the under-20s during the 2002–03 season.

== Style of play ==
Graydon plays as a midfielder and a striker.

== Career statistics ==
As of 25 January 2018

Club	Season	League			FA Cup		League Cup		Other		Total	
Club	Season	Division	Apps	Goals	Apps	Goals	Apps	Goals	Apps	Goals	Apps	Goals
Sunderland	2002–03	FA Premier League	0	0	0	0	0	0	—		0	0
York City (loan)	2002–03	Third Division	7	1	0	0	0	0	0	0	7	1
Scarborough	2003–04	Football Conference	1	0	1	0	—		2 (Note: 1 appearance in Football League Trophy, 1 in FA Trophy)	0	4	0
Gateshead	2005–06	NPL Premier Division	21	1	0	0	—		3 (Note: 1 appearance in FA Trophy, 2 in Northern Premier League Challenge Cup)	0	24	1
Morpeth Town	2014–15	Northern League Division One	20	1	0	0	2	0	4	0	26	1
Morpeth Town	2015–16	Northern League Division One	37	5	2	0	1	0	11	1	51	6
Morpeth Town	2016–17	Northern League Division One	37	9	4	0	0	0	6	2	47	10
Morpeth Town	2017–18	Northern League Division One	22	1	0	0	1	0	3	1	26	2
Career totals												

== Honours ==
Spennymoor Town

- FA Vase: 2012–13

Morpeth Town

- FA Vase: 2015–16
