= 2013 FA Vase final =

- Event: 2012–13 FA Vase
Spennymoor Town	Tunbridge Wells
2	1
- Date: 4 May 2013
- Venue: Wembley Stadium, London

The 2013 FA Vase final was the 39th final of the Football Association's cup competition for teams below level 8 of the English football league system. It was the 30th FA Vase Final. It was contested by Northern Football League team Spennymoor Town and Kent League team Tunbridge Wells. The match was played at Wembley Stadium in London on 4 May 2013.

== Route to the final ==
Spennymoor Town started in the first round against Bridlington Town, winning 5–1. In the second round, they were drawn at home to Newcastle Benfield and winning 5–1. In the third round Spennymoor played fellow Northern Football League team, Billingham Synthonia winning 2–0. They were then drawn against Lordswood in the fourth round, winning 3–1. In the fifth round, they played Bemerton Heath Harlequins winning 4–2. In the quarter-finals, Spennymoor drew Gornal Athletic where they won 3–1. In the semi-finals, Spennymoor were drawn against Guernsey. They won 3–1 in the first leg at Footes Lane in Guernsey and won 1–0 in the second leg for a 4–1 win on aggregate.

Tunbridge Wells started in the second round after receiving a bye in the first round, due to having reached the fifth round the previous year, by defeating Hellenic League Premier Division team Wantage Town 2–0 at their Culverden Stadium. In the third round, they were drawn away to Binfield, where they won 2–1 after extra time. In the fourth round, Tunbridge Wells were drawn against the FA Vase holders, Dunston UTS. After the match was postponed four times, Tunbridge Wells won 1–0 at the Culverden Stadium. In the fifth round, they were drawn away to Larkhall Athletic, where they won 4–3 aet In the quarter-finals, they played Hadleigh United. In front of a record home crowd, Tunbridge Wells won 2–0. In the semi-finals, Tunbridge Wells defeated Shildon 4–3 on aggregate after a 2–0 win at the Culverden Stadium in the first leg and a 3–2 aet loss in the second leg. This made Tunbridge Wells the second Kent League team to reach the FA Vase final in its history.

== Build up ==
After a meeting at Wembley Stadium the week after the semi-finals, where both teams met with The Football Association to decide the choice of dressing rooms and the kit selections, tickets for the final were released on sale on 2 April 2013, with Tunbridge Wells selling over 2,600 tickets within the first 24 hours comparing with an average home crowd of 138.

Both teams set up shops in their respective towns. On 12 April 2013, Spennymoor Town opened a shop under Spennymoor Town Hall after the space was loaned to them by the Mayor of Spennymoor. On 16 April, Tunbridge Wells opened a temporary shop in the offices of the Kent and Sussex Courier newspaper in Royal Tunbridge Wells. On 27 April 2013, Tunbridge Wells opened a second temporary shop in the Royal Victoria Place shopping centre.

== Match details ==
4 May 2013
15:00 BST

Spennymoor Town	2–1	Tunbridge Wells
Cogdon 18'; Graydon 81'	Report	Stanford 78'

Wembley Stadium, London
Attendance: 16,751
Referee: Michael Naylor (Sheffield & Hallamshire FA)

Line-up:
1	(England) Robert Dean
2	(England) Kallum Griffiths
3	(England) Chris Mason
4	(England) Lewis Dodds	(yellow card) 83'
5	(England) Leon Ryan
6	(Republic of Ireland) Stephen Capper
7	(England) Joe Walten		(substituted off) 73'
8	(Republic of Ireland) Keith Graydon
9	(England) Mark Davison		(substituted off) 75'
10	(England) Gavin Cogdon
11	(England) Wayne Phillips		(substituted off) 65'
Substitutes:
12	(England) Michael Rae		(substituted on) 75'
14	(England) Andrew Stephenson		(substituted on) 73'
15	(England) Anthony Peacock		(substituted on) 65'
16	(England) Steven Richardson
17	(England) David Knight
Manager:
(England) Jason Ainsley

Line-up:
1	(England) Chris Oladogba
2	(England) Jason Bourne (c)
3	(England) Lewis Mingle
4	(England) Joe Fuller		(substituted off) 57'
5	(England) Scott Wibley
6	(England) Perry Sprackman	(yellow card) 65'
7	(England) Jon Pilbeam		(substituted off) 85'
8	(Northern Ireland) Andy McMath
9	(England) Andy Irvine
10	(England) Carl Cornell		(substituted off) 57'
11	(England) Josh Stanford
Substitutes:
12	(England) Jack Harris		(substituted on) 57'
13	(England) Andy Boyle
14	(England) Tom Davey		(substituted on) 57'
15	(England) Richard Sinden		(substituted on) 85'
16	(Slovakia) Michal Czanner
Manager:
(England) Martin Larkin

Match officials

- Assistant referees:
  - Ian Hussin (Liverpool FA)
  - Dan Robathan (Bedfordshire FA)
- Fourth official: Stephen Martin (Staffordshire FA)

Match rules

- 90 minutes.
- 30 minutes of extra-time if necessary.
- Penalty shoot-out if scores still level.
- Five named substitutes.
- Maximum of three substitutions.
