= Albert Iles =

English footballer

Personal information
- Full name: Albert Kitchener Iles
- Date of birth: 9 October 1914
- Place of birth: Tunbridge Wells, England
- Date of death: 30 November 1979 (aged 65)
- Place of death: Cambridge, England
- Position: Centre forward

Senior career*
Years	Team	Apps	(Gls)
- Tunbridge Wells Rangers
1937–1939	Bristol Rovers	46	(19)
- Street
- * Club domestic league appearances and goals

Albert Kitchener Iles (9 October 1914 – 30 November 1979) was a professional footballer who played in The Football League for Bristol Rovers prior to the outbreak of World War II.

== Football career ==
Iles began his footballing career playing in the Southern League for Tunbridge Wells Rangers. His prolific scoring record at that level earned him a professional contract with Bristol Rovers, signed on 24 September 1937. He immediately adjusted to the standard of football in Division 3 (South) of The Football League, and ended the 1937–38 season as The Pirates' top goalscorer with 14 goals from 31 games.

The following season, he scored a further five goals in fifteen League appearances, as well as featuring regularly for the reserve team. He played once in the aborted 1939–40 Football League season, and scored 16 goals in 29 wartime guest appearances for Rovers. He also made two guest appearances for Bristol City. After the war he played for Street, and was later trainer at Bristol St. George.

== Non-footballing life ==
In 1939 Iles was working as a fitter at the Bristol Aeroplane Company, and he later spent many years working at SWEB in Bristol.
