= Jimmy Archibald =

Scottish footballer

Personal information
- Full name: James Mitchell Archibald
- Date of birth: 18 September 1892
- Place of birth: Falkirk, Scotland
- Date of death: 25 January 1975 (aged 82)
- Place of death: Waltham Forest, London
- Height: 5 ft 8 1/2 in (1.74 m)
- Position: Wing half

Youth career
- –1912: Motherwell Hearts

Senior career*
| Years | Team | Apps | (Gls) |
| 1912–1914 | Camberslang Rangers | | |
| 1914 | Bellshill Athletic | | |
| 1914–1919 | Motherwell | 52 | (19) |
| 1919–1922 | Tottenham Hotspur | 24 | (1) |
| 1922–1923 | Aberdare Athletic | 30 | (2) |
| 1923–1926 | Clapton Orient | 49 | (1) |
| 1926–1927 | Southend United | 0 | (0) |
| 1927–1928 | Margate Town | | |
| 1928 | Chatham | | |
| 1929–1930 | Tunbridge Wells Rangers | 36 | (2) |
| 1930–1931 | Ashford | | |
- * Club domestic league appearances and goals

James Mitchell Archibald (18 September 1892 – 25 January 1975) was a Scottish professional footballer.

Falkirk-born Archibald initially played as a centre-forward. He was a Lanarkshire Juvenile League and Scottish Juvenile Cup winner in 1912 playing with Motherwell Hearts and played for the Scottish Juvenile Association representative team. The following season he moved on to Glasgow Junior Football League club Camberslang Rangers where he played for two seasons. In July 1914 he joined Bellshill Athletic but within a few months, in October 1914, he signed with senior level Scottish Football League First Division club Motherwell. He scored on his debut later that month in a 1–1 draw at St Mirren. He played with Motherwell for five seasons which coincided with World War I and during this period converted to playing as a wing-half.

Archibald moved to Tottenham Hotspur in the summer of 1919, making his debut in the 1919–20 season in which Spurs were Champions of the Football League Second Division. Over three seasons he played 24 league games, scoring once, before in the summer of 1922 moving to Aberdare Athletic of the Football League Third Division South. Thirty league games and two goals over the 1922–23 season resulted in a move to Clapton Orient. He played 52 times for Orient, 49 games in the Football League Second Division scoring once, and three games in the FA Cup. He was made available for transfer by Orient in May 1926 and subsequently in the following September joined Southend United.

He left Southend without playing in their first team and in December 1927 joined non-league Margate Town who, with Archibald playing in their team, were the 1927–28 Kent League runners-up. In September 1928 he was on a month's trial with Chatham and for the 1929–30 season he was with Tunbridge Wells Rangers. He played regularly in the first half of the following season with Kent League newcomers Ashford.

Archibald died on 25 January 1975 in Waltham Forest, London.
