= George Bratley =

English footballer

Personal information
- Date of birth: 17 January 1909
- Place of birth: Rotherham, England
- Date of death: 1978 (aged 69)
- Height: 5 ft 11 1/2 in (1.82 m)
- Position: Centre half

Senior career*
Years	Team	Apps	(Gls)
- Rotherham YMCA
1929–1933	Rotherham United	85	(11)
1933–1934	Sheffield Wednesday		
1934	Rotherham United		
1934–1935	Gainsborough Trinity		
1935–1936	Bath City		
1936–1938	Barrow		
1938–1939	Swindon Town		
1939	Tunbridge Wells Rangers		
- * Club domestic league appearances and goals

George Bratley (17 January 1909 – March 1978) was an English footballer.

Bratley was a central defender who signed for Rotherham United in 1929, before briefly moving to Sheffield Wednesday before returning to Rotherham in 1934. He had a spell in non-League football with Gainsborough Trinity from 1934 to 1935 and Bath City from 1935 to 1936 before moving back to the Football League in 1936 with Barrow. He moved in 1938 to Swindon Town, before returning to non-League in 1939 with Tunbridge Wells Rangers.
