= George Howes (footballer) =

English footballer

Personal information
- Full name: George Albert Howes
- Date of birth: 5 January 1906
- Place of birth: Jarrow, England
- Date of death: 31 July 1993 (aged 87)
- Place of death: Gosforth, England
- Height: 5 ft 10 1/2 in (1.79 m)
- Position: Right-half

Senior career*
| Years | Team | Apps | (Gls) |
| 19xx–1928 | Jarrow | ? | (?) |
| 1928–1930 | Barnsley | 0 | (0) |
| 1930–1931 | Nelson | 35 | (0) |
| 1931–19xx | Tunbridge Wells Rangers | ? | (?) |
- * Club domestic league appearances and goals

George Albert Howes (5 January 1906 – 31 July 1993) was an English professional footballer who played as a right-half. Born in Jarrow, County Durham, he began his footballing career with his hometown club before joining Football League Second Division side Barnsley in the summer of 1928. He spent two seasons with the Yorkshire-based club but did not make a senior appearance for them.

In May 1930, Howes moved to Third Division North outfit Nelson on a free transfer. He made his professional debut on 30 August 1930 in the 4–5 defeat to Rochdale at Spotland Stadium. He appeared in three of the first five matches of the 1930–31 season, but then spent five weeks out of the team. Howes returned to Nelson's starting line-up for the 2–4 loss away at Crewe Alexandra on 18 October 1930. He retained his place in the side for the remainder of the season, as Nelson finished bottom of the division and failed in their application for re-election to the Football League. Howes played his 35th and final match for the club in the 0–4 defeat to Hull City on 2 May 1931, Nelson's last League fixture.

Howes subsequently signed for Tunbridge Wells Rangers, his last senior club. He died in Gosforth on 31 July 1993, at the age of 87.
