= Stan Morgan =

Welsh footballer

Personal information
- Full name: Alfred Stanley Morgan
- Date of birth: 10 October 1920
- Place of birth: Abergwynfi, Wales
- Date of death: 1971 (aged 50–51)
- Place of death: London, England
- Position: Inside forward

Youth career
- Gwynfi Welfare
- 1938–1946: Gwynfi Welfare

Senior career*
Years	Team	Apps	(Gls)
1946–1948	Arsenal	2	(0)
1948–1949	Walsall	10	(1)
1949–1953	Millwall	156	(21)
1953–1956	Leyton Orient	96	(24)
- Tunbridge Wells
Total		314	(135)
- * Club domestic league appearances and goals

Alfred Stanley Morgan (10 October 1920 – 1971) was a Welsh professional footballer who played as an inside forward. Morgan featured in his career for clubs Arsenal, Walsall, Millwall and Leyton Orient.

== Career ==
Born in Abergwynfi, Morgan started his career with Arsenal in 1938. After making 3 senior appearances for the side his career was interrupted by World War II. At the war's end Morgan returned to Arsenal where he won the 1948 league title with the club. After his spell at Highbury he went on to feature for clubs Walsall, Millwall, Leyton Orient and Tunbridge Wells.

== Personal life ==
Morgan was one of the supporting troops for the Bruneval Raid in 1942, whilst serving in the Royal Fusiliers. He went on to serve in the Parachute Regiment during World War II. He qualified as a military parachutist on course 51 which ran at RAF Ringway from 15 to 27 February 1943 and was subsequently posted to the 6th Parachute Battalion serving with No 7 Platoon in A Company. While with the Battalion he served on operations in Italy, the south of France, Greece and Palestine.
