= Herman Conway =

English footballer

Personal information
- Date of birth: 11 October 1908
- Place of birth: Gainsborough England
- Date of death: 1 April 1983 (aged 74)
- Height: 6 ft 0 in (1.83 m)
- Position: Goalkeeper

Senior career*
Years	Team	Apps	(Gls)
1930–1934	Burnley	81	(0)
1934–1939	West Ham United	122	(0)
1939–1940	Tunbridge Wells Rangers		
1945–1946	Southend United	0	(0)
- * Club domestic league appearances and goals

Herman Conway (11 October 1908 – 1983) was an English professional association footballer who played as a goalkeeper.

He began his career with his local Midland League club, Gainsborough Trinity, establishing himself as their regular first-team goalkeeper from mid-March 1929 onwards. In February 1930 he was transferred to Burnley, having been scouted for them by former Burnley goalkeeper Jerry Dawson.

Conway played over 200 matches in the Football League with Burnley and West Ham United. During the first half of season 1939-40 he played for Tunbridge Wells Rangers before his career was interrupted by the Second World War. In August 1945 he signed for Southend United, where he remained until his retirement as a player in May 1946.
