= Bill Pavitt =

English footballer

William Ernest Pavitt (30 June 1920 – 1989) was a professional footballer who played as a defender for Fulham 1949-1952 and made 79 appearances for Southend United1953-1954. He then moved into Non-League football signing for Tunbridge Wells United in 1955-1956 staying for three seasons before moving on to Ely City.
