= Leah Rosenthal =

Australian nurse

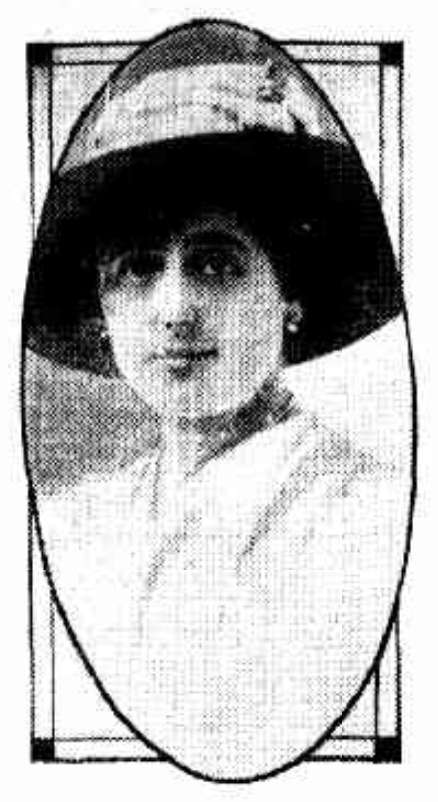
- Rosenthal in c. 1910s
- Born: 23 April 1879; Melbourne, Victoria
- Died: 4 October 1930 (aged 51); Melbourne, Victoria
- Military career
- Allegiance: United Kingdom
- Branch: Queen Alexandra's Imperial Military Nursing Service
- Service years: 1916–1919
- Rank: Sister
- Conflicts: First World War
- Awards: Military Medal; Associate Royal Red Cross

Leah Rosenthal, MM, ARRC (23 April 1879 – 4 October 1930) was a decorated Australian nurse who served in the First World War.

== Early life ==
Rosenthal was born in Melbourne, Victoria, on 23 April 1879, the daughter of Joseph Rosenthal and Martha Avinsky. She trained as a nurse at the Alfred Hospital in Melbourne, where she met and became friends with Isabella Jobson. In late 1910, the two women took over the running of Windarra Private Hospital in Toorak. They left the hospital, and Australia, together in December 1915 and travelled to England to serve in the First World War.

== Career ==
In England, Rosenthal and Jobson joined Queen Alexandra's Imperial Military Nursing Service (QAIMNS), and in February 1916 they were assigned to Baythorpe Military Hospital in Nottingham. In April of that year, they embarked for duty in France. Rosenthal was assigned to various stationary hospitals and casualty clearing stations and served until April 1919, when she resigned her position.

Rosenthal returned to Melbourne in May, and she and Jobson again bought a private hospital to run together. The hospital had previously been named St Luke’s Private Hospital, however Jobson and Rosenthal re-named it Vimy House, perhaps after the site of the Battle of Vimy Ridge, one of the battlegrounds where the pair had nursed in France during the war.

In 1931, Jobson inaugurated an annual prize in Rosenthal's name for nurses at the Alfred Hospital, the Leah Rosenthal prize for best theatre nurse of the year.

== Awards ==
Rosenthal was awarded the Military Medal and the Associate Royal Red Cross for her service in France.

== Death ==
Rosenthal died on 4 October 1930.
