= Jim Taylor (footballer, born 1917) =

English footballer

Personal information
- Full name: James Guy Taylor
- Date of birth: 5 November 1917
- Place of birth: Hillingdon, England
- Date of death: 6 March 2001 (aged 83)
- Position: Defender

Senior career*
Years	Team	Apps	(Gls)
1938–1953	Fulham	229	(5)
1953–1954	Queens Park Rangers	41	(0)
1954–1958	Tunbridge Wells United		
1958–1959	Yiewsley		

International career
1950–1951	England	2	(0)

Managerial career
- 1954–1958: Tunbridge Wells United
- 1958–1959: Yiewsley
- * Club domestic league appearances and goals

James Guy Taylor (5 November 1917 – 6 March 2001) was an England international footballer born in Hillingdon, Middlesex. He played at centre half.

During his career, he played for Fulham in 261 league matches between 1938 and 1953 and spent two seasons at Queens Park Rangers, for whom he appeared on 41 occasions. He then moved into non-league football as player–manager of Tunbridge Wells United from 1954 to 1958 before moving to Yiewsley until March 1959. He also played twice for the England national football team, and was part of England's team for the 1950 FIFA World Cup, although he did not play in the tournament.
