= Alf Noakes =

English footballer

Personal information
- Full name: Alfred George Noakes
- Date of birth: 14 August 1933
- Place of birth: Stratford, Greater London
- Date of death: 2005 (aged 71–72)
- Position: Left back

Youth career
- ?–1950: West Ham United

Senior career*
Years	Team	Apps	(Gls)
1950–1955	West Ham United	0	(0)
1953–1955	→ Sittingbourne (loan)	?	(?)
1955–1962	Crystal Palace	195	(14)
1962–1964	Portsmouth	13	(0)
1964–?	Tunbridge Wells	?	(?)
- * Club domestic league appearances and goals

Alfred George Noakes (14 August 1933 – 2005) was an English professional footballer who played mainly as a left back. He made a total of 208 appearances in the Football League for Crystal Palace and Portsmouth although he began his career with West Ham United.

== Playing career ==
=== Early career ===
Noakes began his youth career at West Ham United and although he subsequently signed professional terms, did not make a senior appearance for the club. He was allowed to join Sittingbourne on loan, from whom he was signed by Crystal Palace.

=== Crystal Palace ===
In June 1955, Noakes signed for Crystal Palace, then playing in the old Third Division South, and made his debut early the next season as a forward. After the Football League reorganisation in 1958, Palace competed in the Fourth Division, but in 1961, were promoted back to Division Three and Noakes missed only six games that season (40 appearances) scoring one goal. However, Noakes made only 2 appearances the next season and in July 1962 he was signed for Portsmouth by former Palace manager, George Smith. He had made a total of 195 league appearances for Palace scoring 14 times.

=== Portsmouth and later career ===
Noakes joined Portsmouth in July 1962 but after making only 13 appearances in two seasons he was allowed to leave on a free transfer and joined Tunbridge Wells.

Alf Noakes died in 2005 aged 71 or 72.
