= Owen McNally =

Scottish footballer

Personal information
- Full name: Owen McNally
- Date of birth: 20 June 1906
- Place of birth: Denny, Scotland
- Date of death: 1973 (aged 66–67)
- Place of death: Denny, Scotland
- Height: 5 ft 7 in (1.70 m)
- Position: Forward

Senior career*
Years	Team	Apps	(Gls)
- Denny Hibernian
1926–1930	Celtic	11	(3)
1927–1928	→ Arthurlie (loan)	33	(32)
1929	→ Hamilton Academical (loan)	10	(7)
1930–1931	Bray Unknowns		(21)
1931–1932	Cardiff City	6	(0)
1932–1933	Bray Unknowns		(2)
1933	Norwich City	0	(0)
1933–1934	Lausanne		
1934–1935	Stenhousemuir		
1935	Sligo Rovers		
1935–1936	Lisburn Distillery		
1936–1937	Leicester City	16	(7)
1937–1938	Calais		
1938–1939	Shamrock Rovers		(14)
- * Club domestic league appearances and goals

Owen McNally (20 June 1906 – 1973) was a Scottish professional footballer who played as a forward. He began his senior career with Celtic but his first team opportunities were restricted by Jimmy McGrory. After loans spells with Arthurlie and Hamilton Academical, he left the club and embarked on a nomadic playing career that included spells in Ireland, Switzerland and the English Football League.

== Career ==
After playing for junior side Denny Hibernian, McNally joined Celtic and made his professional debut on 9 April 1927 in a 3–3 draw with Dundee United. At the start of the following season, he was loaned to Scottish Second Division side Arthurlie. On 1 October 1927, he scored eight goals in a single match during a 10–0 victory over Armadale, the joint record for the most goals scored by a single player in a Scottish Football League match. After a prolific season with Arthurlie, he returned to Celtic for the 1927–28 season. He scored his first goal for the club against Hamilton Academical but made only two appearances during the season as he struggled to displace Jimmy McGrory from the first team. After a further season behind McGrory and a loan spell with Hamilton, he decided to move on, signing for Irish side Bray Unknowns. In the 1930–31 season, he finished as the club's top goalscorer with 21 league goals as they finished eighth.

In 1931, he signed for Cardiff City; however, after playing in five consecutive matches without scoring at the start of the 1930–31 season, he was replaced by Albert Keating. He made one further appearance before returning to Bray Unknowns soon after. He returned to the Football League in 1933 for a brief spell with Norwich City but was unable to break into the first team. He later played for Swiss side Lausanne, Stenhousemuir, Sligo Rovers and Lisburn Distillery.

In January 1936, he joined Football League Second Division side Leicester City for a fee of £1000. He made his debut for the club on 30 January 1936 in a 1–1 draw with Nottingham Forest and went on to score seven goals in sixteen league appearances. He eventually lost his place in the side to Jack Bowers and left to join French side Calais before finishing his career with Shamrock Rovers. He finished the 1939–40 season as Rovers' top goalscorer with fourteen league goals as they finished as winners of the League of Ireland.

== Honours ==
Shamrock Rovers

- League of Ireland winner: 1939–40
