= Isabella Jobson =

Australian nurse

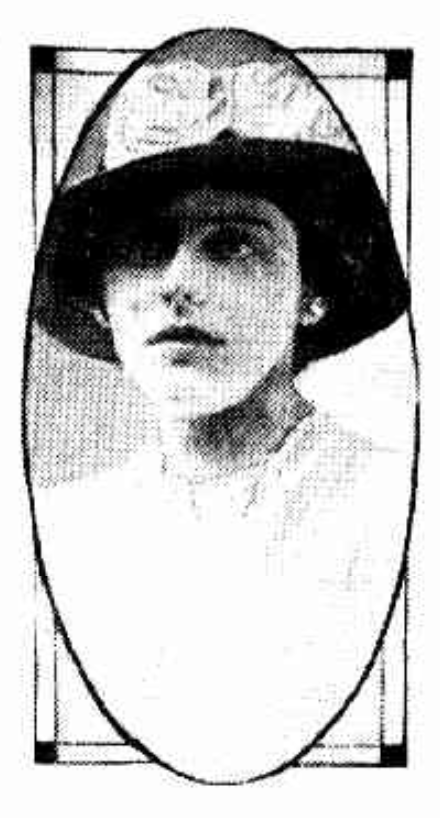
- Jobson in c. 1910s
- Born: 1878; Clunes, Victoria
- Died: 6 July 1943 (aged 64–65); Melbourne, Victoria
- Relatives: Brigadier General Alexander Jobson (brother)
- Military career
- Allegiance: United Kingdom
- Branch: Queen Alexandra's Imperial Military Nursing Service
- Service years: 1916–1919
- Rank: Sister
- Conflicts: First World War
- Awards: Associate Royal Red Cross

Isabella Kate Jobson, ARRC (1878 – 6 July 1943) was a decorated Australian nurse who served in the First World War.

== Early life and career ==
Jobson was born in Clunes, Victoria, in 1878 to Christopher Jobson, a merchant from Northumberland, England, and his second wife Elizabeth Cameron (née McColl), from Scotland. She was the younger sister of Alexander Jobson. She was educated at South Melbourne College and, in 1893, passed the University of Melbourne's matriculation examinations in algebra, geometry, arithmetic and geography, and gained honours in French. She trained as a nurse at the Alfred Hospital in Melbourne, where she met and became friends with Leah Rosenthal; in late 1910 the two women took over the running of Windarra Private Hospital in Toorak. They left the hospital, and Australia, together in December 1915 and travelled to England to serve in the First World War.

== Nursing career ==
In England, Jobson and Rosenthal joined Queen Alexandra's Imperial Military Nursing Service (QAIMNS) and in February 1916 they were assigned to Baythorpe Military Hospital in Nottingham. In April of that year, they embarked for duty in France. Jobson was assigned to stationary hospitals and casualty clearing stations and served until January 1919, when she resigned her appointment. She returned to Melbourne in May 1919, where she and Rosenthal again bought a private hospital to run together. The hospital had previously been named St Luke’s Private Hospital, however Jobson and Rosenthal re-named it Vimy House, perhaps after the site of the Battle of Vimy Ridge, one of the battlegrounds where the pair had nursed in France during the war. Following Rosenthal's death in 1930, Jobson ran the hospital alone.

Jobson was awarded the Associate Royal Red Cross for her service in France. She died at Vimy House on 6 July 1943 after a long illness. A private funeral was held and Jobson was buried at Melbourne Cemetery, Carlton.
