= Alf Bentley (footballer, born 1931) =

English footballer

Personal information
- Full name: Alfred Bentley
- Date of birth: 28 October 1931
- Date of death: 15 October 1996 (aged 64)
- Position: Goalkeeper

Senior career*
Years	Team	Apps	(Gls)
- Snowdown Colliery Welfare
1955–1958	Coventry City		
1958	Margate		
1958–1962	Gillingham		
1962–1963	Tunbridge Wells		
1963–1966	Hastings United		
1966–1967	Snowdown Colliery Welfare		

Managerial career
- 1970–1975: Canterbury City
- 1975–1976: Ramsgate
- 1976–1980: Dover
- 1980–1984: Folkestone
- 1983–1985: Canterbury City
- 1987–1988: Canterbury City (caretaker)
- 1990: Folkestone
- 1991–1992: Canterbury City
- 1992–1993: Snowdown Colliery Welfare
- * Club domestic league appearances and goals

Alfred Bentley (28 October 1931 – 15 October 1996) was an English professional association football goalkeeper.

== Playing career ==
He started his career with Snowdown Colliery Welfare before moving into the Football League with Coventry City in 1955–56. After a spell with Margate he returned to league football in 1958 with Gillingham, making 42 appearances in the Football League. In 1962 he joined Tunbridge Wells United before going on to Hastings United, finishing his playing career back at Snowdown in the 1966–67 season.

== Management career ==
After retiring from playing Bentley had managerial spells with Canterbury City (1970–1975), Ramsgate (1975–76), Dover (1976–1980) and Folkestone (1980–1984). Bentley then returned to Canterbury City as manager-director towards the end of the 1983–84 season, he remained there until the end of the 1984–85 season before being replaced by Carl Gilbert.

During the 1987–88 season he had another spell at Canterbury City as caretaker manager. He then went back to Folkestone as manager in the summer of 1990, before resigning at the end of September 1990.

Bentley returned to Canterbury City for the start of the 1991–92 season, although he was sacked in January 1992.

He returned to his old club, Snowdown Colliery Welfare, for the start of the 1992–93 season. He was part of a three-man management team, working with Roy Hare and Alan Jones. He would become Snowdown Colliery Welfare's chairman for the 1993–94 season.

== Personal life ==
Bentley ran the Red Lion public house in Dover from 1982 to 1987 and again during 1992. He died in 1996, shortly before his 65th birthday.
