= Roy Proverbs =

English footballer

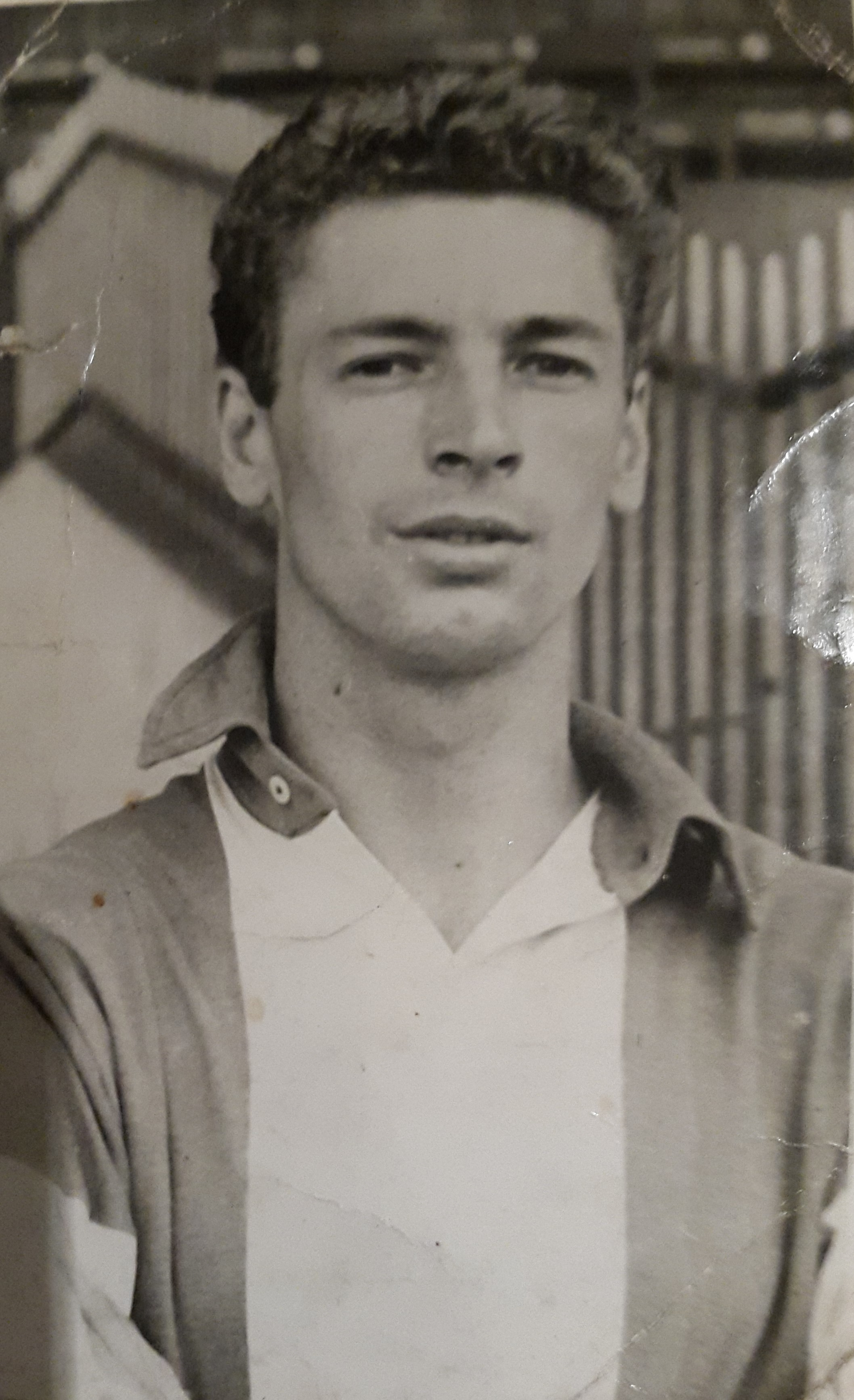

Personal information
- Full name: Roy John Proverbs
- Date of birth: 8 July 1932
- Place of birth: Wednesbury, England
- Date of death: 15 February 2017 (aged 84)
- Position: Defender

Senior career*
Years	Team	Apps	(Gls)
1955–1956	Stratford Town	19	(1)
1956–1957	Coventry City	10	(0)
1957–1958	Bournemouth & Boscombe Athletic	0	(0)
1958–1962	Gillingham	143	(2)
1962	Canterbury City	5	(0)
1962	Tunbridge Wells United	5	(0)
1962–1965	King's Lynn	113	(0)
1965–1966	Banbury United	58	(0)
- * Club domestic league appearances and goals

Roy John Proverbs (8 July 1932 – 15 February 2017) was an English professional footballer. His clubs included Coventry City, Bournemouth & Boscombe Athletic and Gillingham, where he made over 140 Football League appearances. He played primarily at right full back throughout his career. During his time at Gillingham, he was given the nickname "Chopper" Proverbs due to his no-nonsense style of defending.
