= Arthur Nelson (footballer) =

English footballer

Personal information
- Full name: Arthur Nelson
- Date of birth: 15 May 1909
- Place of birth: Darnall, England
- Date of death: 1977 (aged 67–68)
- Position: Inside forward

Senior career*
Years	Team	Apps	(Gls)
19??–1927	Sheffield Woodhouse	?	(?)
1927–1928	Hull City	21	(8)
	Scarborough	?	(?)
1930	Notts County	0	(0)
1931–1932	Stockport County	19	(6)
1932–1933	Luton Town	21	(5)
	Nuneaton Town	?	(?)
	Wellington Town	?	(?)
	Burton Town	?	(?)
Total		61	(19)
- * Club domestic league appearances and goals

Arthur Nelson (15 May 1909 – 1977) was an English footballer who played for Hull City, Stockport County and Luton Town in the Football League.
