= Jimmy Maidment =

English footballer (1901–1977)

Personal information
- Full name: James Henry Charlton Maidment
- Date of birth: 28 September 1901
- Place of birth: Southwick, England
- Date of death: 12 February 1977 (aged 75)
- Place of death: Rushcliffe, England
- Position: Goalkeeper

Senior career*
| Years | Team | Apps | (Gls) |
- Robert Thompson's
| 1923–1924 | Southend United | 13 | (0) |
| 1924–1930 | Newport County | 220 | (3) |
| 1930–1931 | Lincoln City | 41 | (0) |
| 1931–1933 | Notts County | 44 | (0) |
| 1933–1934 | Accrington Stanley | 37 | (0) |
| Total | | 355 | (3) |
- * Club domestic league appearances and goals

James Henry Charlton Maidment (28 September 1901 – 12 February 1977) was an English footballer who made 355 appearances in the Football League playing for Southend United, Newport County, Lincoln City, Notts County and Accrington Stanley. He played as a goalkeeper.

== Life and career ==
Maidment was born in 1901 in Southwick, County Durham, the eldest son of Charles Kirtley Maidment, a labourer in a glassworks, and his wife, Amelia née Charlton. At the time of the 1911 Census, Maidment had two younger brothers living; the younger of the two, Tom, also became a professional footballer. His father died in a mining accident while working at Hylton Colliery during the First World War.

Maidment began his football career with Robert Thompson's works team before moving south to join Football League Third Division South club Southend United in 1923. After one season, during which he played infrequently, he moved on to Newport County, on the recommendation of his uncle, Billy Charlton, who was already on the club's books. Over the next six years, he played 220 League matches, missing only two league matches over his first three seasons and, unusually for a goalkeeper, scored three goals, all from the penalty spot. He then spent the 1930–31 season with Lincoln City as their regular goalkeeper, playing alongside his younger brother Tom as Lincoln finished as runners-up in the Third Division North. He spent two seasons in the Second Division with Notts County before finishing his career back in the third tier with Accrington Stanley.

He married Georgina Upton in 1924. The 1939 Register finds him living in West Bridgford, Nottinghamshire, and working as a dairyman. He died in Rushcliffe, Nottinghamshire, in 1977 at the age of 75.
