= Billy Thomas (footballer, born 1903) =

Welsh footballer (1903–1991)

Personal information
- Date of birth: 20 August 1903
- Place of birth: Port Talbot
- Date of death: 30 November 1991 (aged 88)
- Position: Winger

Youth career
- Port Talbot Steelworks

Senior career*
Years	Team	Apps	(Gls)
1922-26	Bridgend Town		
1926-27	Lovell's Athletic		
1927-36	Newport County	305	(57)
1936	Barry Town		
1937-39	Aberdare Athletic		
1922-26	Port Talbot Steelworks		

International career
1923	Welsh League XI	1	(0)
1930	Wales	2	(0)
- * Club domestic league appearances and goals

William Rees Thomas (20 August 1903 – 30 November 1991) was a Welsh footballer.

While a playing for Bridgend Town Thomas was selected to represent the Welsh League against the Irish League at Solitude in Belfast. The game ended 2-2.

Thomas won his first Wales national football team cap in 1930 against Scotland as part of 'The Unknowns', a team composed of players playing in Wales or amateurs in England because English clubs refused to release their Welsh players. In an effort to try and force international games to be moved to midweek rather than on weekends - which the international teams opposed as they didn't attract big gates - the Football League clubs took steps to stop clubs from releasing players to play internationals if they were held on the same day as a full programme of league games.

Nine of the starting XI, including Thomas, were making their international debut. Only Len Evans and captain Fred Keenor had represented their country before. Remarkably, the Welsh team held Scotland to a 1-1 draw.

Thomas kept his place for the next game against England but Wales could not repeat the effort and lost 4-0.

Thomas played much of his club football for Newport County, but also represented Bridgend Town, Barry Town, Aberdare Athletic and the Steelworks team in his home town of Port Talbot.

In the early 1990s just before his death, Thomas was the oldest living Wales international.
