= Eric Morris (1930s footballer) =

Welsh footballer

Personal information
- Full name: Eric Lewis Morris
- Place of birth: Cardiff, Wales
- Position: Full back

Senior career*
Years	Team	Apps	(Gls)
1931–1932	Cardiff City	16	(0)
- * Club domestic league appearances and goals

Eric Lewis Morris was a Welsh professional footballer who played as a defender.

== Career ==
After being spotted playing local amateur football, Morris was signed by Cardiff City in 1931. He made his debut in a 5–0 victory over Northampton Town in January 1932. In his third appearance, he played in a 9–2 victory over Thames, the club's record victory. He made sixteen league appearances but was released at the end of the season, returning to non-league football.
