= Harry O'Neill (footballer, born 1908) =

English footballer

Personal information
- Full name: Henry O'Neill
- Date of birth: 1908
- Place of birth: Liverpool, England
- Date of death: 1939 (aged 30–31)
- Place of death: Highgate, London, England
- Position: Forward

Senior career*
Years	Team	Apps	(Gls)
1926–1927	Everton	0	(0)
- Earle
- Runcorn
1931–1932	Cardiff City	9	(2)
- Bern
- Red Star Olympique
- Hurst
1937–1938	Stockport County	0	(0)
1938–1939	Wigan Athletic	2	(1)
- * Club domestic league appearances and goals

Henry O'Neill (1908–1939) was an English professional footballer who played as a forward.

Born in Liverpool, O'Neill started his career at Everton, but did not make a first team appearance for the club. After spells at Earle and Runcorn, he returned to the Football League with Cardiff City in 1931, where he made nine league appearances, scoring two goals. In February 1932, he moved to Switzerland to join FC Bern, and later played for Red Star Olympique in France.

When he returned to England, O'Neill also played for Hurst, Stockport County and Wigan Athletic.

In 1939, O'Neill died of cancer at Archway Hospital, Highgate while on a business trip in London.
