= Culverden Stadium =

Football stadium in Kent, England

Coordinates: 51.14432°N 0.25087°E

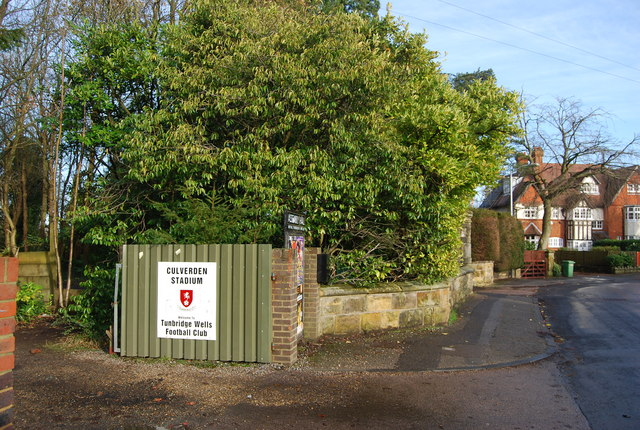
- Culverden Stadium
- Interactive map of Culverden Stadium
- Location: Culverden Stadium, Culverden Park Road, Royal Tunbridge Wells
- Owner: Tunbridge Wells F.C
- Operator: Tunbridge Wells F.C
- Capacity: 3,750 (250 seated)

Culverden Stadium is an association football stadium in Royal Tunbridge Wells, Kent, England. It is the home ground of Tunbridge Wells F.C. It has a capacity of 3,750, with 250 seats. It is located in Culverden Park Road, Tunbridge Wells.

== History ==
The Culverden Stadium was opened in 1962 as a permanent home for Tunbridge Wells. The occasion was commemorated with a charity football match between Tunbridge Wells and a TV All Stars team which included Jess Conrad and Bernard Bresslaw. On 31 August 2005, during an FA Cup Preliminary Round Replay, the Culverden Stadium was the location of a record set for the most penalty kicks taken in a penalty shoot-out. The match was won by Tunbridge Wells against Littlehampton Town 16-15 after 40 penalty kicks. This was recognised as an FA and European record. In September 2006, the Culverden Stadium was subject to a series of vandalism attacks. The clubhouse was broken into and equipment was stolen. A later attempt was thwarted after Tunbridge Wells officials boarded the windows of the clubhouse. The record crowd at the Culverden Stadium was 1,810 set in March 2013 for an FA Vase quarter final between Tunbridge Wells and Hadleigh United.

In January 2023, the clubhouse was damaged by a fire.

=== Pitch ===
The Culverden Stadium was recognised in non-league football for having a poor surface. It also has a sloped pitch. To address this in 2012, Tunbridge Wells set up a pitch fund to gain funds to improve it.

== Usage ==
The Culverden Stadium hosts the annual Courier Cup in August. The Culverden is also used for non-football purposes with it being used as a location for bingo.
