= Percy Richards (English footballer) =

English footballer

Personal information
- Place of birth: Manchester, England
- Date of death: 26 December 1967
- Position: Centre forward

Senior career*
| Years | Team | Apps | (Gls) |
| 1922 | Macclesfield | 3 | (2) |
- New Mills
| 1925–1927 | Burnley | 9 | (8) |
| 1927–1930 | Plymouth Argyle | 29 | (15) |
| 1930–1932 | Tunbridge Wells Rangers | | |
| 1932–19?? | Folkestone Town | | |
- * Club domestic league appearances and goals

Percy Richards was an English professional footballer who played as a centre forward. After leaving Plymouth Argyle he signed for Tunbridge Wells Rangers in 1930.
