= Jimmy Armstrong (footballer, born 1904) =

English footballer

Personal information
- Full name: James Harris Armstrong
- Date of birth: 8 March 1904
- Place of birth: Lemington, Newcastle-upon-Tyne, England
- Date of death: 13 April 1971 (aged 67)
- Place of death: Watford, Hertfordshire, England
- Height: 6 ft 0 in (1.83 m)
- Position: Centre half

Senior career*
Years	Team	Apps	(Gls)
- Easington Colliery
1926–1928	Clapton Orient	2	(0)
1928–1933	Queens Park Rangers	122	(5)
1933–1940	Watford	187	(2)
- * Club domestic league appearances and goals

James Harris Armstrong (8 March 1904 – 13 April 1971) was an English footballer who played as a centre half.

Born in Lemington, Newcastle-upon-Tyne, Armstrong played as an amateur at Easington Colliery, before turning professional in November 1926 with Clapton Orient. At the end of the 1927–28 season he transferred to Queens Park Rangers, before joining Watford on a free transfer in May 1933. Armstrong made over 200 appearances for Watford in all competitions, scoring twice. He was part of the team that won the 1937 Third Division South Cup under the player-management of Neil McBain. He left the club in 1940, following the suspension of competitive football due to the Second World War.

Following his retirement from professional football, Armstrong worked for Universal Asbestos, and remained in their employment until shortly before his death. He died on 13 April 1971 in Watford, Hertfordshire.
