= Cyril Hemingway =

English footballer

Personal information
- Full name: Francis Cecil Hemingway
- Date of birth: 18 November 1903
- Place of birth: Hoyland, Yorkshire, England
- Date of death: 9 October 1978 (aged 74)
- Place of death: London, England
- Position: Inside forward

Senior career*
| Years | Team | Apps | (Gls) |
| 1925–1928 | Rotherham United | 67 | (22) |
| 1928–1929 | Torquay United | 38 | (11) |
| 1929–1930 | Exeter City | 39 | (19) |
| 1930–1931 | Wolverhampton Wanderers | 4 | (0) |
| 1931–1932 | Torquay United | 23 | (4) |
| 1932 | Dartmouth United | | |
| Total | | 171 | (56) |
- * Club domestic league appearances and goals

Francis Cecil Hemingway (18 November 1903 – 9 October 1978), known as Cyril Hemingway, was an English footballer who played in the Football League for Exeter City, Rotherham United, Torquay United and Wolverhampton Wanderers.

In 1931, Hemingway married Linda Hicks in Torquay, where her father was the owner of a hotel. Hemingway became proprietor of a pub in Dartmouth, where he played for Dartmouth A.F.C.
