= Jane Maidment =

New Zealand social work academic

Jane M. Maidment.
- Education: University of Canterbury
- Scientific career
- Fields: Social work
- Workplaces: University of Canterbury
- Thesis: Social work field education in New Zealand (2000)

Jane M. Maidment is a New Zealand social work academic, and as of 2019 is a full professor at the University of Canterbury.

== Academic career ==
After a PhD titled 'Social work field education in New Zealand' at the University of Canterbury, Maidment joined the staff, rising to full professor.

Much of Maidments' research involves social work teaching.

== Selected works ==
- Maidment, Jane. "Problems experienced by students on field placement: Using research findings to inform curriculum design and content." Australian Social Work 56, no. 1 (2003): 50–60.
- Maidment, Jane, and Ronnie Egan. Practice skills in social work and welfare: More than just common sense. No. 2nd ed. Allen and Unwin, 2009.
- Connolly, Marie, Louise Harms, and Jane Maidment, eds. Social work: Contexts and practice. Oxford University Press Australia & New Zealand, 2009.
- Maidment, Jane. "The quiet remedy: A dialogue on reshaping professional relationships." Families in Society 87, no. 1 (2006): 115–121.
- Maidment, Jane. "Teaching social work online: Dilemmas and debates." Social Work Education 24, no. 2 (2005): 185–195.
- Maidment, Jane. "Using on-line delivery to support students during practicum placements." Australian social work 59, no. 1 (2006): 47–55.
