= Charles Fraser (footballer) =

English footballer

Personal information
- Full name: Charles Roderick Fraser
- Date of birth: 1907
- Place of birth: Plaistow, Newham, England
- Position: Defender

Youth career
- Fairbairn House

Senior career*
| Years | Team | Apps | (Gls) |
| 1926–1935 | Luton Town | 246 | (4) |
- * Club domestic league appearances and goals

Charles Roderick Fraser (born 1907, date of death unknown) was an English professional footballer, who spent his entire career with Luton Town.

== Career ==
After playing youth football for his local club Fairbairn House, Fraser signed for Luton Town in 1926. Making 270 appearances in nine years with the club, Fraser left the club in 1935.
