= Arthur Mills (footballer, born 1906) =

English professional footballer

Arthur Sidney Mills (born 1906, date of death unknown) was an English professional footballer of the 1930s. Born in Karachi (then in India) in 1906, he joined Gillingham from Luton Town in 1933 and went on to make 33 appearances for the club in The Football League, scoring 12 goals. He left to join Burton Town in 1934.
