= Reg Keating =

English footballer (1904–1961)

Personal information
- Date of birth: 14 May 1904
- Place of birth: Halton, Leeds, England
- Date of death: 13 October 1961 (aged 57)
- Place of death: Northumberland, England
- Height: 5 ft 9 in (1.75 m)
- Position: Forward

Senior career*
Years	Team	Apps	(Gls)
1925–1926	Annfield Plain		
1926	Scotswood United		
1926–1927	Newcastle United	0	(0)
1927–1928	Lincoln City	2	(0)
1928–1929	Gainsborough Trinity		
1929–1930	Scarborough		
1930–1931	Stockport County	5	(0)
1931–1932	Birmingham	5	(1)
1932–1933	Norwich City	2	(0)
1933	North Shields		
1933–1934	Bath City		
1934–1936	Cardiff City	70	(35)
1936	Doncaster Rovers	3	(0)
1936–1937	Bournemouth & Boscombe Athletic	11	(5)
1937–1939	Carlisle United	5	(1)
- * Club domestic league appearances and goals

Reginald Keating (14 May 1904 – 13 October 1961) was an English professional footballer who scored 42 goals in 103 appearances in the Football League.

== Life and career ==
Keating was born in Halton, Leeds. He began his playing career in local football in the Newcastle upon Tyne area before joining Newcastle United, his first professional club, in October 1926. He was released in 1927 without playing for the first team, and embarked on a tour of league and non-league clubs: Lincoln City, where he made his debut in the Football League, Gainsborough Trinity, Scarborough, Stockport County, Birmingham, where he scored his first Football League goal, Norwich City, where he was one of five new forwards signed in the 1932 close season to add to the six already on the club's books, North Shields, and Bath City, eventually, at the age of 30, settling at Cardiff City.

In two and a half seasons at Ninian Park, Keating, a pacy right-sided or centre forward, scored 35 league goals at a rate of one every other game, and was their leading goalscorer in each of his full seasons with the club. He went on to play for Doncaster Rovers, Bournemouth & Boscombe Athletic and Carlisle United, and retired in 1939.

He later acted as a scout for Preston North End, in which role he was instrumental in Howard Kendall joining the club.

Keating, the younger brother of Bristol City and Cardiff City (among others) forward Albert Keating, died in Northumberland in 1961 at the age of 57.
