= Tunbridge Wells F.C. =

Association football club in England

Coordinates: 51°08′39.65″N 0°15′03.21″E

Tunbridge Wells
- Full name: Tunbridge Wells Football Club
- Nicknames: The Wells, The Royals
- Founded: 1886
- Ground: Culverden Stadium, Royal Tunbridge Wells
- Capacity: 3,750 (250 seated)
- Chairman: Scott Bartlett / Michael Boyle
- Manager: Vacant
- League: Southern Counties East League Premier Division
- 2025–26: Southern Counties East League Premier Division, 10th of 19
- Website: http://www.tunbridgewellsfc.com/
| Home colours | Away colours |

Tunbridge Wells Football Club is a football club based in Royal Tunbridge Wells, Kent, England. They are currently members of the Southern Counties East League Premier Division. They play their home games at Culverden Stadium. The club is affiliated to the Kent County Football Association.

== History ==
Tunbridge Wells FC was originally formed in 1886, and played as an amateur side until the First World War when they folded. After many seasons of playing friendlies, they joined the South Eastern League in 1905 followed by the Southern Amateur, Isthmian and Spartan Leagues. Tunbridge Wells Rangers were a separate club founded as a professional team in 1903 when they joined the Kent League. They stayed there for three seasons before joining the Southern Football League in Division Two for the start of the 1906–07 season. However, after two seasons they rejoined the Kent League and the South Eastern League. They were to stay in the Kent League until they rejoined the Southern League as members of the Eastern Section for the 1931–32 season, after winning the Kent League the season before. Two seasons after joining the Eastern section the club started playing in the Central section as well. In the 1936–37 season the club then played in the Southern section but also competed in the Southern League Midweek Section, becoming champions of this competition in the 1938–39 season. During their time in the Southern league the club managed to get to the second round of the FA Cup twice.

In the 1930s Tunbridge Wells Rangers were a significant force in non-league football. This is evident in an article published in The FA News in November 2006, in which they looked at all clubs that had played more than 100 FA Cup matches. The FA News then produced a list of each club's percentage success rate. In terms of winning FA Cup ties, Tunbridge Wells Rangers were the most successful club in the country. Their results were played 105, won 62. The record shows that the percentage of pre-war cup ties won was 59.05%.

After the Second World War, the Wells briefly returned to the amateur leagues as Tunbridge Wells before re-joining the Kent League for the 1950-51 campaign as Tunbridge Wells United and then the Southern League for the 1959–60 season. During this period the club once again progressed to the first round proper of the FA Cup but endured a 5–0 defeat at the hands of Brighton & Hove Albion. In 1961 they fared slightly better, edged out 3–1 by Aldershot – their last appearance to date in the Cup proper.

In the early 1960s Rangers – a name to which they reverted in 1963 – began to struggle in the Southern League and in 1967 the club folded. The supporters formed a new club, once again called simply Tunbridge Wells FC, and re-joined the Kent League. The Wells won the Kent League championship in 1985 and have also won the Kent League Cup on four occasions since the reformation of the club as well as reaching the last 32 of the FA Vase on no less than five occasions.

On 31 August 2005, Tunbridge Wells made football history by winning the longest penalty shoot-out ever in a senior cup match. No less than 40 spot kicks were needed before Wells emerged as the victors, 16–15 over Littlehampton Town in the FA Cup preliminary round. After a poor start to the 2007–08 season, Mike Robbins, previously of Rye United, was installed as manager. After a promising start, Wells drifted from the top three to tenth after many players left to play at a higher level. Robbins stepped down from his post at the conclusion of the 2008–09 season, to be replaced in his position of manager by his assistant, Martin Larkin.

This appointment turned out to be a masterstroke as Martin Larkin coached Tunbridge Wells to the Final of the FA Vase, and they played Spennymoor Town of the Northern Premier League on 4 May 2013 at Wembley. Tunbridge Wells lost 2–1 in the Final, despite a Josh Stanford goal 12 minutes from the end. Spennymoor Town took an early lead in the match, scoring after 18 minutes. Stanford briefly equalised before the County Durham team sealed their victory with the winning goal just 90 seconds later.

In 2011 the club formed a partnership with Junior Club Tunbridge Wells Ridgewaye FC who changed their name to Tunbridge Wells Youth Football Club and they became the only official Junior football club for Tunbridge Wells FC. With the united goal of developing the young players of the Town.

In the 2013–14 season the Kent League became the Southern Counties East League and Tunbridge Wells transferred to the new Premier Division where they have remained ever since.

Martin Larkin resigned in 2015. During the period he was manager Tunbridge Wells had won silverware for the first time in 25 years, and were runners up in three further cup finals. In terms of where Tunbridge Wells finished in the leagues between 2009 and 2015, the club showed year on year improvement under Larkin.

== Colours ==
The club's colours are all red. Before the Second World War, they were blue and gold stripes, with white shorts. The club had adopted red and white by 1979.

== Ground ==
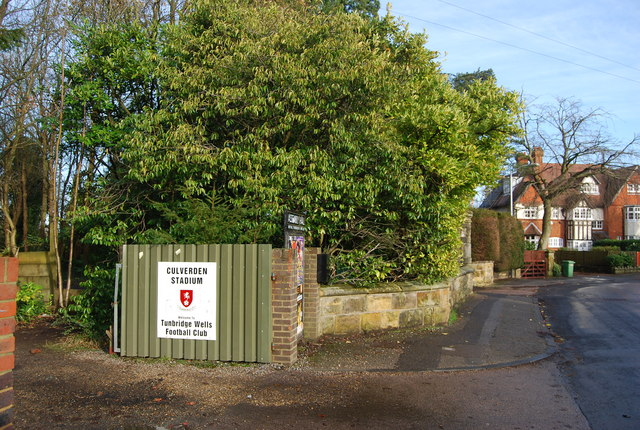
Culverden Stadium entrance

Tunbridge Wells play their home games at the Culverden Stadium in Tunbridge Wells. The ground's capacity is 3,750, of which 250 is seated. The ground is floodlit and has a slightly sloped pitch. The ground also hosts the annual Courier Cup in August.

The Culverden Stadium was opened in 1962 as a permanent home for the club. The occasion was commemorated with a charity football match between Tunbridge Wells and a TV All Stars team which included Jess Conrad and Bernard Bresslaw. On 31 August 2005, during an FA Cup Preliminary Round Replay, the Culverden Stadium was the location of a record set for the most penalty kicks taken in a penalty shoot-out. The match was won by Tunbridge Wells against Littlehampton Town 16–15 after 40 penalty kicks. This was recognized as an FA and European record. In September 2006, the Culverden Stadium was subject to a series of vandalism attacks. The clubhouse was broken into and equipment was stolen. A later attempt was thwarted after Tunbridge Wells officials boarded the windows of the clubhouse. A fire on 12 January 2023, started by an electrical fault, heavily damaged the clubhouse and made the venue unusable for the foreseeable future.

== Honours ==
The club has gained the following honours in line with whichever suffix name was being used at the time i.e. Rangers, United, FC.

=== League honours ===
- Southern Football League Midweek Section
  - Champions (1): 1938–39
- Kent League
  - League Champions(2): 1930–31, 1984–85
  - Runners-up (2): 1956–57, 1968–69
- Southern Amateur Football League Section B Champions
  - Champions (1): 1909–10

=== Cup honours ===
- Kent Senior Cup
  - Winners (3): 1907–08 1938–39 1954–55
- Kent Senior Trophy
  - Winners (1): 2012–13
  - Runners-up (4): 1985–86; 1991–92; 2005–06; 2010–11
- Kent Senior Shield
  - Winners (2): 1931–32, 1954–55
- Kent League Cup
  - Winners (7) 1932–33, 1933–34, 1954–55, 1974–75, 1977–78, 1985–86, 1987–88.
- FA Vase
  - Runners-up (1): 2013

== Records ==
=== Club records ===
Highest league position

- 8th in Southern League, 1938–39

FA Cup best performance:

- Second round, 1930–31, 1936–37

FA Vase best performance:

- Runners-up, 2013

Highest home attendances:

- 5,788 v Margate 1930 (FA Cup) at Down Farm (as Tunbridge Wells Rangers)
- 3,057 v Maidstone United 1962 (FA Cup)
- 1,754 v Shildon (FA Vase semi final) 23 March 2013

Largest crowds to watch Tunbridge Wells away:

- 4 May 2013 FA Vase Final v Spennymore Town – 16,751 (at Wembley Stadium)
- 1954 FA Cup v Brighton and Hove Albion – 16,000
- 1936 Southern League v Ipswich Town – 14,211
- 1939 Kent Senior Cup Final v Gillingham – 13,500
- 1930 FA Cup v Carlisle United – 11,500

Record win:

- 10–0 v Deal Town, 1985–86

=== Player records ===
Record appearances:

- 412 – Jason Bourne

Record goal scorer:

- 151 – John Wingate

== Notable former players ==
1. Players who have played/managed more than 20 times in the football league or any foreign equivalent to this level (i.e. fully professional league)
2. Players with full international caps
- (England) Samuel Abel
- (England) Harold Andrews
- (England) Harry Anstiss
- (Scotland) Jimmy Archibald
- (England) Fred Avey
- (Wales) George Ballsom
- (England) George Beel
- (England) Alf Bentley
- (England) George Bratley
- (England) Frank Brett
- (England) Ronnie Burke
- (Republic of Ireland) Kevin Clarke
- (England) Tim Coleman
- (England) Albert Collins
- (England) Herman Conway
- (England) Jimmy Dimmock
- (England) George Douglas
- (Republic of Ireland) Jimmy Dunne
- (England) George Emmerson
- (England) Harry Ford
- (Scotland) David Galloway
- (England) Ben Garfield
- (Scotland) Stan Gullan
- (England) Ernest Hart
- (England) Syd Hartley
- (England) Harold George Howe
- (England) George Howes
- (Scotland) Willie Hurrell
- (England) Gordon Hurst
- (England) Albert Iles
- (Wales) Fred Keenor
- (England) Bobby Laverick
- (Scotland) Johnny McNichol
- (Wales) Jackie Mittell
- (Wales) Stan Morgan
- (England) Alf Noakes
- (England) Henry O'Grady
- (England) Bill Pavitt
- (England) Walter Pollard
- (England) Roy Proverbs
- (England) Percy Richards
- (England) Alf Ridyard
- (England) Ernie Robinson
- (England) Tommy Robinson
- (England) Harry Rowbotham
- (England) Jock Rutherford
- (Scotland) John Ryden
- (Scotland) Bob Shankly
- (Scotland) Wilf Sharp
- (England) John Shepherd
- (England) Bill Sheppard
- (Scotland) Jimmy Smith
- (England) Charlie Spencer
- (England) Billy Sperrin
- (England) John Summers
- (England) Jim Taylor
- (England) Billy Thirlaway
- (England) James Thompson
- (England) Hugh Vallance
- (England) Jimmy Watson
- (Wales) Horace Williams

For a list of all the other players with a Wikipedia profile and have played for Tunbridge Wells:

== Former coaches ==
1. Managers/Coaches who have played/managed in the football league or any foreign equivalent to this level (i.e. fully professional league)
2. Managers/Coaches with full international caps
- (England) Jim Taylor
