= Jimmy McCambridge =

Irish footballer

Personal information
- Full name: James McCambridge
- Date of birth: 23 September 1905
- Place of birth: Larne, Ireland
- Date of death: 1988 (aged 82–83)
- Height: 5 ft 10 in (1.78 m)
- Position: Striker

Senior career*
Years	Team	Apps	(Gls)
1928–1930	Ballymena	48	(30)
1930	Everton	0	(0)
1930–1933	Cardiff City	95	(51)
1933–1935	Bristol Rovers	58	(23)
1935–1936	Exeter City	23	(14)
1936–1937	Sheffield Wednesday	2	(0)
1937–1938	Hartlepools United	16	(4)
1938–1939	Cheltenham Town		

International career
1929–1930	Irish League XI	2	(3)
1930–1931	Ireland	4	(0)
- * Club domestic league appearances and goals

James McCambridge (23 September 1905 – 1988) was an Irish professional footballer. He was capped 4 times by Ireland during his career.

== Career ==
McCambridge began his football career with his hometown club Larne and reached the Irish Cup final in 1928, in which Larne were defeated by Willowfield after a replay.

In June 1928, McCambridge became one of the first signings for the newly formed Ballymena team and was a goalscoring revelation at the Ballymena Showgrounds - scoring 32 goals including one in the Irish Cup final as the Braidmen shocked Belfast Celtic to win the cup in their first season of senior football. The second season continued with similar success and on 1 February 1930 he became the first Ballymena player to be capped at international level when he played in a 7–0 win over Wales. He retained his place for the next International three weeks later, as Ireland lost to Scotland at Parkhead.

=== Professional career ===
Shortly after the Scotland game, McCambridge secured a £1,750 transfer to Everton. However, he spent just three months at Goodison Park, making one appearance in place of Dixie Dean in a 3–0 win over Bradford City in the FA Cup.

He left the club in December to sign for Cardiff City, scoring twice on his debut the following month in January 1931 during a 3–2 defeat to West Bromwich Albion. He finished the season with 9 goals, including a hat-trick against Stoke City. His first full season at the club the next year yielded a total of 28 goals in all competitions and, with 26 of the goals scored in the league, he broke the club record of league goals scored in a single season set by Hughie Ferguson four years earlier by one. His record stood for 15 years until it was broken by Stan Richards in the 1946–47 season.

The following season, McCambridge was unable to match his goalscoring feat of the previous year but still finished as the club's top scorer with 18 goals in all competitions. Despite finishing as Cardiff's top scorer in his two full seasons at Ninian Park, as well as winning the final two Ireland caps of his career in matches against Wales and England, he was allowed to leave in 1933 to join Bristol Rovers. He moved around several times in the following years, playing at Exeter City, Sheffield Wednesday, Hartlepool United before finishing his career at Cheltenham Town in the Southern League.
