= William Bagley (footballer) =

English footballer (born 1909)

Personal information
- Date of birth: 8 July 1909
- Place of birth: Wolverhampton, England
- Position: Inside left

Senior career*
Years	Team	Apps	(Gls)
1929–1933	Newport County	95	(18)
1933–1941	Portsmouth	129	(12)
- * Club domestic league appearances and goals

William Bagley (born 8 July 1909, date of death unknown) was an English professional footballer, born in Wolverhampton, who played as an inside left for Newport County and Portsmouth.
