= Jack Jobson (footballer) =

English footballer

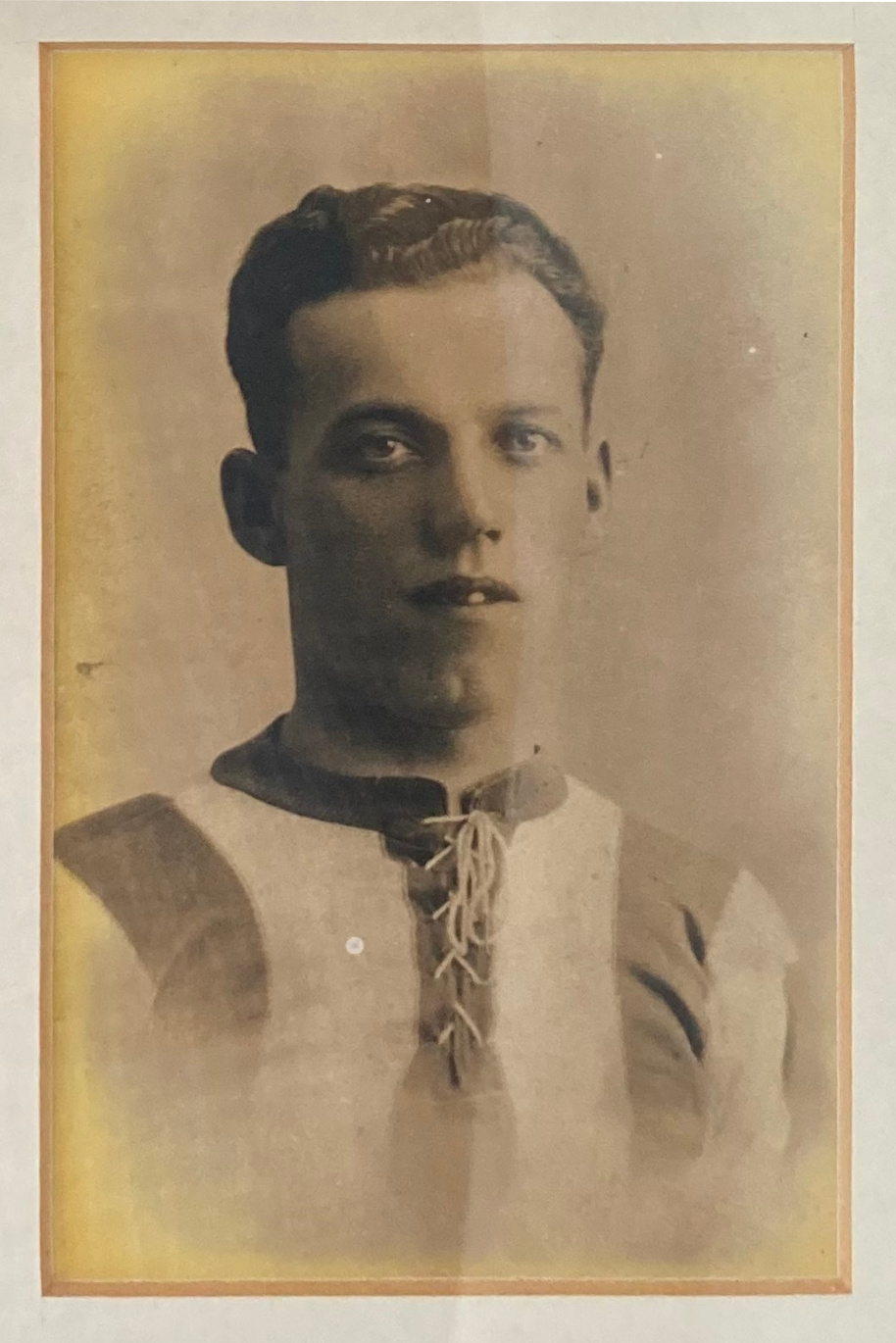

Personal information
- Full name: John Thomas Jobson
- Date of birth: 8 August 1900
- Place of birth: Hebburn, England
- Date of death: 1983 (aged 82–83)
- Position: Central defender

Senior career*
Years	Team	Apps	(Gls)
1921–1922	Washington Colliery		
1922–1923	Plymouth Argyle	1	(0)
1924–1927	Hartlepools United	103	(2)
1927–1932	Stockport County	171	(7)
1932–1933	Queens Park Rangers	4	(0)
1933–1934	Gateshead	8	(0)
Total		287	(9)
- * Club domestic league appearances and goals

John Thomas Jobson (8 August 1900 – 1983) was an English footballer who played in the Football League for Gateshead, Hartlepools United, Plymouth Argyle, Queens Park Rangers and Stockport County.
