= Alexander Jobson =

Australian Army officer

- Born: 2 April 1875; Clunes, Victoria
- Died: 7 November 1933 (aged 58); Sydney
- Military career
- Allegiance: Australia
- Branch: Australian Army
- Service years: 1898–1921
- Rank: Brigadier General
- Commands: 2nd Battalion, 53rd Infantry Regiment (1918–1921); 9th Infantry Brigade (1916–1917); 35th Infantry Regiment (1915–1916); 34th Infantry Regiment (1913–1915)
- Conflicts: First World War; Western Front; Battle of Messines
- Awards: Distinguished Service Order; Colonial Auxiliary Forces Officers' Decoration; Mention in Despatches (2)
- Other work: Director of AMP

Brigadier General Alexander Jobson, DSO, VD (2 April 1875 – 7 November 1933) was a senior Australian Army officer during the First World War.

== Early life and career ==
Alexander Jobson was born on 2 April 1875 in Clunes, Victoria. He was educated in the public system and at the age of 14 he started working as a junior clerk with the Australian Mutual Provident Society (AMP) in Melbourne. He studied accountancy and qualified as an Associate of the Institute of Actuaries and a Fellow of the Australian Corporation of Public Accountants. Jobson moved to Sydney in 1902 and became actuary for an American firm. He established his own business as an accountant and actuary in 1906. From 1910 to 1916, he also wrote a financial column in the Sydney Sun.

Jobson enlisted in the Scottish Rifles in August 1898 and was commissioned as a full lieutenant on 2 December 1899. He was promoted to captain on 29 August 1902. After moving to Sydney he joined the New South Wales Scottish Rifles with the rank of lieutenant on 1 January 1903 and was promoted to captain again on 1 July. He was promoted major on 13 September 1909. He transferred to the 25th Infantry on 1 July 1912 and on 1 July 1913 he was promoted to lieutenant colonel; and appointed to command the 34th Infantry Regiment.

== First World War ==
Jobson joined the Australian Imperial Force on 10 February 1916 with the rank of colonel and was given command of the 9th Infantry Brigade. He was promoted to temporary brigadier general on 1 May 1916, shortly before departing Sydney. He arrived in London via South Africa and Dakar on 11 July. The brigade trained on Salisbury Plain before moving to France in November. The brigade entered the area of the line known as "Nursery Sector" at Armentières on 26 November.

Twice, during the absence of Major General John Monash in 1917, Jobson became acting commander of the 3rd Division. His brigade was involved in a number of raids and Jobson was mentioned in dispatches for his part. At the Battle of Messines in June 1917, Jobson's planning and performance was excellent, but afterwards Jobson seemed badly affected by the stress of the situation. At a conference on 24 July, Jobson appeared to be in an agitated state and Monash felt that his friend was becoming unstable.

Jobson relinquished command on 25 August 1917 and returned to Australia where his appointment with the AIF was terminated on 9 December. Monash arranged for him to be again mentioned in despatches and awarded the Distinguished Service Order in the 1918 New Year Honours.

== Post war ==
In October 1918, Jobson was appointed to command the 2nd Battalion, 53rd Infantry Regiment with the rank of lieutenant colonel and honorary brigadier general. Failure in the field was apparently considered no bar to promotion and he was promoted to colonel in December 1919 and transferred to the Reserve of Officers in 1921.

After the war, Jobson held a number of company directorates, most notably director of AMP in 1925 and vice-chairman in 1932.

Jobson collapsed and died from a coronary occlusion in King Street, Sydney on 7 November 1933 and was cremated.

== See also ==
- List of Australian generals
