= Peter Ronan =

Scottish footballer

Personal information
- Full name: Peter Ronan
- Date of birth: 1911
- Place of birth: Dysart, Scotland
- Position: Wing half

Senior career*
Years	Team	Apps	(Gls)
1930–1931	Cardiff City	30	(1)
- East Fife
- * Club domestic league appearances and goals

Peter Ronan (1911 – after 1932) was a Scottish professional footballer. He joined Cardiff City in 1931 as a replacement for Billy Hardy but was released after one season. He instead returned to Scotland where he later played for East Fife.
