= Edward Jobson (cricketer) =

English cricketer

Personal information
- Full name: Edward Russell Jobson
- Batting: Right-handed
- Bowling: Right-arm medium

Career statistics
Competition	First-class
Matches	8
Runs scored	208
Batting average	14.85
100s/50s	0/0
Top score	43
Balls bowled	6
Wickets	0
Bowling average	–
5 wickets in innings	–
10 wickets in match	–
Best bowling	–
Catches/stumpings	1/–
- Source: Cricinfo, 8 November 2022

Edward Russell Jobson (20 March 1855 – 20 April 1909) was an English first-class cricketer who played on a few occasions for Worcestershire between 1900 and 1903. He had previously played for the county in the late 19th century, before its elevation to the County Championship, as well as making one first-class appearance for Marylebone Cricket Club (MCC).

Jobson played a 12-a-side game for Stourbridge Cricket Club against Gentlemen of Canada in 1880, a match in which James Gillean took five wickets in successive balls for the Canadians. Jobson played minor cricket for Worcestershire through the 1880s and 1890s, averaging more than 45 in 1886. In August 1891 he made his first-class debut when he was chosen to open the batting for MCC against Somerset at Taunton, top-scoring in the second innings with 43.

Jobson made his Championship debut for Worcestershire against Sussex in May 1900, hitting 4 and 17 at the top of the order. Between then and 1903 he appeared six more times for the county, but never made a substantial score at this level despite having hit centuries for Worcestershire in minor-cricket days.

Jobson was born in Wall Heath, Staffordshire. He died at the age of 54 at Holbeache House, Wall Heath, after undergoing an operation for appendicitis.
