= Tom Maidment =

English footballer

Personal information
- Full name: Thomas Maidment
- Date of birth: 4 November 1905
- Place of birth: Monkwearmouth, England
- Date of death: 14 January 1971 (aged 65)
- Height: 5 ft 11 in (1.80 m)
- Position: Forward

Senior career*
Years	Team	Apps	(Gls)
- St Columba
- Robert Thompson's
192x–1926	Sunderland	0	(0)
1926–1931	Lincoln City	126	(43)
1931–1932	Portsmouth	3	(0)
1932–1933	Workington		
1933–1934	Cardiff City	44	(8)
1934–193x	Blyth Spartans		
193x–19xx	South Shields		
- * Club domestic league appearances and goals

Thomas Maidment (4 November 1905 – 14 January 1971) was an English professional footballer who scored 51 goals from 173 appearances in the Football League playing for Lincoln City, Portsmouth and Cardiff City.

== Life and career ==
Maidment was born in Monkwearmouth, County Durham (now part of Sunderland). He played football for the Durham County Schools XI before beginning his professional career with Sunderland A.F.C., but never made the breakthrough to the club's first team. In January 1926 he signed for Lincoln City, then playing in the Football League Third Division North. Although he went on to score 47 goals from 130 appearances in senior competition for the club, a 1932 book suggested he failed to take full advantage of his strengths and abilities.

He moved on to First Division club Portsmouth in 1931, but played only three times in the top flight before dropping into non-league football with Workington. Portsmouth retained his Football League registration, and Cardiff City had to pay "a big transfer fee" to bring him back to the Third Division in January 1933. He spent 18 months with Cardiff before returning to non-league football in his native north-east of England with Blyth Spartans and then South Shields.

Maidment died in 1971 at the age of 65.

Maidment's older brother, Jimmy, played as a goalkeeper; he made more than 200 Football League appearances for Newport County, and also played for several other clubs.
