= Ted Braithwaite =

English footballer

Personal information
- Full name: Edward Braithwaite
- Date of birth: 12 December 1902
- Place of birth: Salford, England
- Date of death: 1990 (aged 87–88)
- Height: 5 ft 7 1/2 in (1.71 m)
- Positions: Inside forward; wing half

Senior career*
Years	Team	Apps	(Gls)
1921	New Cross		
1921–1924	Bradford City	17	(2)
1924–1929	Reading	133	(22)
1929–1933	Swindon Town	142	(6)
1933–1935	Margate		
1935–1936	Ramsgate		
1936–1937	Canterbury Waverley		
1937	Ashford		
Total		292	(30)
- * Club domestic league appearances and goals

Edward Braithwaite (12 December 1902 – 1990) was an English footballer who made 292 appearances in the Football League for Bradford City, Reading and Swindon Town.

Born in Salford he was signed from New Cross of the Manchester Football League by Bradford City in December 1921. Between 1921 and 1924 he made a total of 17 appearances for Bradford City in the Football League (2 in the Football League First Division and 15 in Football League Second Division) and 1 in the FA Cup. Both goals he scored for 'The Bantams' were in a Division 2 home fixture against Fulham in December 1922.

In the summer of 1924 he signed with Reading then of the Football League Third Division South and was a regular member of the team that were the 1925–1926 champions of that division and promoted to Division Two. After a further three seasons with 'The Biscuitmen' in the summer of 1929 Braithwaite was transferred to Third Division South club Swindon Town for a fee, decided by tribunal, of £100 (Reading had wanted £500). He remained with Swindon Town for four seasons before at the end of the 1932–1933 season (in which the team finished at the foot of the Division Three South table), in a clear-out of players, he was not retained by the club.

During the close season Braithwaite signed for Margate who subsequently were runners-up of the Eastern Division of the 1933–34 Southern Football League. After a second season with Margate, over the following three seasons he appeared for three different Kent League clubs: in 1935–36 for a full season with Ramsgate; then in mid-season 1936–37 with Canterbury Waverley; and finally with Ashford during the early part of the following season.

== Sources ==
- Frost, Terry (1988). Bradford City A Complete Record 1903-1988. Breedon Books Sport. ISBN 0-907969-38-0.
