= Ted Marcroft =

English footballer

Personal information
- Full name: Edward Hollows Marcroft
- Date of birth: 13 April 1910
- Place of birth: Rochdale, England
- Date of death: 1975 (aged 64–65)
- Place of death: Lancashire, England
- Height: 5 ft 8 1/2 in (1.74 m)
- Position: Winger

Senior career*
Years	Team	Apps	(Gls)
1929–1930	Bacup Borough		
1930–1931	Great Harwood		
1931–1932	Middlesbrough	1	(1)
1932–1933	Queens Park Rangers	33	(9)
1933–1934	Cardiff City	28	(2)
1934–1935	Accrington Stanley		
1935–1936	Bacup Borough		
1936–1937	Rochdale		
1937–1939	Macclesfield Town	63	(10)
- * Club domestic league appearances and goals

Edward Hollows Marcroft (13 April 1910 – 1975) was an English professional footballer. During his career he played for several Football League clubs.

== Career ==
Marcroft began his career playing in the Lancashire League for Bacup Borough and Great Harwood where his performances prompted First Division side Middlesbrough to sign him for £200. He made a goalscoring debut in January 1932, earning his side a point in a 1–1 draw with Sheffield Wednesday, but never played another senior game for the club before joining Queens Park Rangers in May 1932.

In 1933, he joined Third Division South side Cardiff City in a swap deal that saw George Emmerson move the other way. He featured heavily for the first team, making 28 league appearances during the 1933–34 season, but was released at the end of the campaign. He returned north, playing for Accrington Stanley, Bacup Borough and Rochdale before joining Macclesfield Town in August 1937. In two seasons, he played over 60 league games for Macclesfield before his career was ended by the outbreak of World War II.
