= George Emmerson =

English footballer (1906–1966)

Personal information
- Full name: George Arthur Heads Emmerson
- Date of birth: 15 May 1906
- Place of birth: Bishop Auckland, England
- Date of death: 6 December 1966 (aged 60)
- Place of death: Melton Mowbray, Leicestershire
- Height: 5 ft 8 in (1.73 m)
- Position: Winger

Senior career*
Years	Team	Apps	(Gls)
–1928	Jarrow		
1928–1930	Middlesbrough		
1930–1933	Cardiff City	120	(16)
1933–1935	Queens Park Rangers	60	(16)
1935–1936	Rochdale		
1936–1937	Tunbridge Wells Rangers		
1937–1938	Gillingham	10	(0)
- * Club domestic league appearances and goals

George Arthur Heads Emmerson (15 May 1906 – 6 December 1966) was an English professional footballer.

== Career ==
While playing for local side Jarrow, Emmerson was spotted by Middlesbrough and was offered the chance to play league football with the club in 1928. He spent two years at the club, making eight appearances including scoring a hat-trick in his second appearance, a 3–0 victory over Millwall.

He moved to Cardiff City in 1930. A regular in the side during his three years at Ninian Park, including being ever-present during the 1931–32 season. In 1933 he was involved in a swap deal with Ted Marcroft which saw him join Queens Park Rangers. He later finished his career after spells at Rochdale, Tunbridge Wells Rangers and Gillingham. After his retirement he returned to his job as a plumber, a trade he was working in before becoming a footballer.
