= Albert Keating =

English footballer

Personal information
- Full name: Albert Edward Keating
- Date of birth: 28 June 1902
- Place of birth: Swillington Common, England
- Date of death: 18 October 1984
- Place of death: Newcastle upon Tyne, England
- Height: 5 ft 9 1/2 in (1.77 m)
- Position: Inside left

Youth career
- Prudhoe Castle

Senior career*
Years	Team	Apps	(Gls)
1922–1925	Newcastle United	12	(3)
1925–1928	Bristol City	79	(47)
1928–1931	Blackburn Rovers	17	(5)
1931–1932	Cardiff City	46	(23)
1932–1933	Bristol City	21	(6)
1933–19??	North Shields		
- Throckley Welfare
- * Club domestic league appearances and goals

Albert Edward Keating (28 June 1902 – 18 October 1984) was an English footballer who played as an inside left. He made 175 Football League appearances in the years after the First World War.

== Career ==
Keating played locally for Prudhoe Castle, then joined Newcastle United for £130 in January 1922. Alex Raisbeck signed Smailes for £650 in November 1925 for Bristol City. Keating joined Blackburn Rovers along with Clarrie Bourton for £4,000 in May 1928. He moved to Cardiff City in February 1931 before rejoining Bristol City in November 1932. In July 1933 Keating returned to his native north-east and joined North Shields. His last club was Throckley Welfare. After retiring from playing Keating became a referee on Tyneside.

Keating's younger brother Reg also played League football.

== Honours ==
with Bristol City

- Football League Third Division South winner: 1926–27
