= 1935–36 Cardiff City F.C. season =

Welsh football club season

Cardiff City
1935–36 season
- Chairman: Tudor Steer
- Manager: (Wales) Ben Watts-Jones
- Division Three South: 20th
- FA Cup: 1st round
- Welsh Cup: Quarter Finals
- Third Division South Cup: 1st round
- Top goalscorer: League: Reg Keating (10); All: Reg Keating (11)
- Highest home attendance: 18,774 (v Bristol Rovers, 2 September 1935)
- Lowest home attendance: 3,765 (v Watford, 15 January 1936)
- Average home league attendance: 9,528
Home colours

The 1935–36 season was Cardiff City F.C.'s 16th season in the Football League. They competed in the 22-team Division Three South, then the third tier of English football, finishing 20th.

== Season review ==
=== Football League Third Division South ===
==== Partial league table ====
Pos	Team	Pld	W	D	L	GF	GA	GAv	Pts	Promotion
18	Southend United	42	13	10	19	61	62	0.984	36	
19	Swindon Town	42	14	8	20	64	73	0.877	36	
20	Cardiff City	42	13	10	19	60	73	0.822	36	
21	Newport County	42	11	9	22	60	111	0.541	31	Re-elected
22	Exeter City	42	8	11	23	59	93	0.634	27	Re-elected

=== Results by round ===
Round	1	2	3	4	5	6	7	8	9	10	11	12	13	14	15	16	17	18	19	20	21	22	23	24	25	26	27	28	29	30	31	32	33	34	35	36	37	38	39	40	41	42
Ground	A	H	H	A	A	H	A	H	A	H	H	A	H	A	H	A	A	A	H	H	A	A	H	H	H	A	H	A	A	H	A	H	H	A	H	A	H	H	A	A	H	A
Result	L	D	L	D	D	W	L	D	D	W	W	L	L	L	W	W	L	L	D	D	L	L	L	W	W	D	L	L	L	W	L	W	W	W	W	L	D	W	L	D	L	L
Position	~	~	19	19	19	12	19	19	19	17	12	16	18	19	17	14	16	20	18	18	19	20	21	17	14	15	18	19	20	20	20	18	15	15	12	15	16	13	13	13	16	20
Points	0	1	1	2	3	5	5	6	7	9	11	11	11	11	13	15	15	15	16	17	17	17	17	19	21	22	22	22	22	24	24	26	28	30	32	32	33	35	35	36	36	36

A = Away; H = Home; W = Win; D = Draw; L = Loss

== Players ==
First team squad. Note: Flags indicate national team as defined under FIFA eligibility rules; some limited exceptions apply. Players may hold more than one non-FIFA nationality.

No.	Pos.	Nation	Player
--	GK	ENG	Jack Deighton
--	GK	SCO	Jock Leckie
--	GK	WAL	George Poland
--	DF	ENG	Billy Bassett
--	DF	EIR	Jack Everest
--	DF	ENG	Cliff Godfrey
--	DF	WAL	Arthur Granville
--	DF	SCO	Hugh Hearty
--	MF	WAL	Len Attley
--	MF	WAL	Bryn Davies
--	MF	ENG	Wally Jennings
--	MF	ENG	Charles McDonagh

No.	Pos.	Nation	Player
--	FW	ENG	Jack Diamond
--	FW	WAL	Freddie Hill
--	FW	WAL	Wilf Lewis
--	FW	WAL	James McKenzie
--	FW	WAL	Enoch Mort
--	FW	WAL	Reg Pugh
--	FW	WAL	Doug Redwood
--	FW	ENG	Harold Riley
--	FW	ENG	Joe Roberts
--	FW	ENG	Harry Roper
--	FW	ENG	Harold Smith
--	FW	WAL	Daniel J Williams

== Fixtures and results ==
=== Third Division South ===
31 August 1935 1	Crystal Palace	3–2	Cardiff City	London
	Goal		Harry Riley; Freddie Hill	Stadium: Selhurst Park; Attendance: 16,694

2 September 1935 2	Cardiff City	0–0	Bristol Rovers	Cardiff
				Stadium: Ninian Park; Attendance: 18,774

7 September 1935 3	Cardiff City	2–3	Reading	Cardiff
	Robert Done (o.g.); Harry Roper		Tommy Tait; Jimmy Liddle; Joe McGough	Stadium: Ninian Park; Attendance: 16,850

11 September 1935 4	Bristol Rovers	1–1	Cardiff City	Bristol
	Goal		Reg Pugh	Stadium: Eastville; Attendance: 11,209

14 September 1935 5	Newport County	0–0	Cardiff City	Newport
				Stadium: Somerton Park; Attendance: 15,858

16 September 1935 6	Cardiff City	4–1	Clapton Orient	Cardiff
	Harry Roper; Harry Riley; Freddie Hill; Freddie Hill		Goal	Stadium: Ninian Park; Attendance: 7,239

21 September 1935 7	Gillingham	3–0	Cardiff City	Gillingham
	Goal			Stadium: Priestfield Stadium; Attendance: 5,663

28 September 1935 8	Cardiff City	1–1	Bournemouth	Cardiff
	Harold Smith		Goal	Stadium: Ninian Park; Attendance: 11,844

5 October 1935 9	Luton Town	2–2	Cardiff City	Luton
15:15	Jack Ball 56'; Jock Finlayson 70'	Luton report	27' Jack Diamond; Jack Diamond	Stadium: Kenilworth Road; Attendance: 12,288; Referee: G Dutton (Warwick)

12 October 1935 10	Cardiff City	3–2	Notts County	Cardiff
	Freddie Hill; Jack Diamond; George Walker (o.g.)		Goal	Stadium: Ninian Park; Attendance: 11,458

19 October 1935 11	Cardiff City	1–0	Coventry City	Cardiff
	Joe Roberts			Stadium: Ninian Park; Attendance: 12,239

26 October 1935 12	Swindon Town	2–1	Cardiff City	Swindon
	Jim Parmley (pen.); Jim Parmley 48'		25' Reg Pugh	Stadium: County Ground; Attendance: 8,224; Referee: EW Vokes

2 November 1935 13	Cardiff City	0–1	Aldershot	Cardiff
			Goal	Stadium: Ninian Park; Attendance: 8,506

9 November 1935 14	Exeter City	2–0	Cardiff City	Exeter
	Goal			Stadium: St James Park; Attendance: 4,590

16 November 1935 15	Cardiff City	3–1	Millwall	Cardiff
	Joe Roberts; Joe Roberts; Jack Diamond		Goal	Stadium: Ninian Park; Attendance: 8,185

23 November 1935 16	Bristol City	0–2	Cardiff City	Bristol
			Jack Diamond; Joe Roberts	Stadium: Ashton Gate; Attendance: 10,350

7 December 1935 17	Queens Park Rangers	5–1	Cardiff City	London
	Goal		Jack Diamond	Stadium: Loftus Road; Attendance: 5,048

25 December 1935 18	Southend United	3–1	Cardiff City	Southend
	Goal		Jack Everest	Stadium: Roots Hall; Attendance: 8,478

26 December 1935 19	Cardiff City	1–1	Southend United	Cardiff
	Jack Diamond		Goal	Stadium: Ninian Park; Attendance: 11,574

28 December 1935 20	Cardiff City	1–1	Crystal Palace	Cardiff
	Jack Diamond		Goal	Stadium: Ninian Park; Attendance: 7,411

4 January 1936 21	Reading	4–1	Cardiff City	Reading
	Goal		Reg Keating	Stadium: Elm Park; Attendance: 8,713

11 January 1936 22	Torquay United	2–1	Cardiff City	Torquay
	Goal		Reg Keating	Stadium: Plainmoor; Attendance: 3,560

15 January 1936 23	Cardiff City	0–2	Watford	Cardiff
			Goal	Stadium: Ninian Park; Attendance: 3,765

18 January 1936 24	Cardiff City	2–0	Newport County	Cardiff
	Harold Smith; Harry Riley			Stadium: Ninian Park; Attendance: 10,981

25 January 1936 25	Cardiff City	4–0	Gillingham	Cardiff
	Daniel J Williams; Daniel J Williams; Harry Riley; Joe Roberts			Stadium: Ninian Park; Attendance: 5,998

1 February 1936 26	Bournemouth	4–4	Cardiff City	Bournemouth
	Goal		Reg Keating; Reg Keating; Daniel J Williams; Reg Pugh	Stadium: Dean Court; Attendance: 7,058

8 February 1936 27	Cardiff City	2–3	Luton Town	Cardiff
	Daniel J Williams; Daniel J Williams	Luton report	3' George Stephenson (??) Bill Boyd	Stadium: Ninian Park; Attendance: 12,142; Referee: G Dutton (Warwick)

15 February 1936 28	Notts County	2–0	Cardiff City	Nottingham
	Goal			Stadium: Meadow Lane; Attendance: 4,639

22 February 1936 29	Coventry City	5–1	Cardiff City	Coventry
	Goal		Jack Everest	Stadium: Highfield Road; Attendance: 11,257

29 February 1936 30	Cardiff City	5–2	Exeter City	Cardiff
	Wilf Lewis; Reg Pugh; Harold Smith; Jack Diamond; Daniel J Williams		Goal	Stadium: Ninian Park; Attendance: 6,390

7 March 1936 31	Brighton & Hove Albion	1–0	Cardiff City	Brighton
	Goal			Stadium: Goldstone Ground; Attendance: 8,198

14 March 1936 32	Cardiff City	2–1	Swindon Town	Cardiff
	Reg Keating 3'; Reg Keating		Syd Lowry	Stadium: Ninian Park; Attendance: 8,637; Referee: WJ Lewington

18 March 1936 33	Cardiff City	1–0	Brighton & Hove Albion	Cardiff
	Daniel J Williams			Stadium: Ninian Park; Attendance: 4,268

21 March 1936 34	Millwall	2–4	Cardiff City	Millwall
	Goal		Reg Keating; Reg Keating; Reg Keating; Daniel J Williams	Stadium: The Den; Attendance: 11,774

28 March 1936 35	Cardiff City	1–0	Bristol City	Cardiff
	Reg Keating			Stadium: Ninian Park; Attendance: 9,755

4 April 1936 36	Watford	4–0	Cardiff City	Watford
	Goal			Stadium: Vicarage Road; Attendance: 5,165

10 April 1936 37	Cardiff City	0–0	Northampton Town	Cardiff
				Stadium: Ninian Park; Attendance: 11,302

11 April 1936 38	Cardiff City	3–2	Queens Park Rangers	Cardiff
	Harry Riley; Harry Riley; Reg Pugh		Goal	Stadium: Ninian Park; Attendance: 8,571

13 April 1936 39	Northampton Town	2–0	Cardiff City	Northampton
	Goal			Stadium: County Ground; Attendance: 7,890

18 April 1936 40	Aldershot	1–1	Cardiff City	Aldershot
	Goal		Daniel J Williams	Stadium: Recreation Ground; Attendance: 4,271

25 April 1936 41	Cardiff City	1–2	Torquay United	Cardiff
	Reg Pugh		Goal	Stadium: Ninian Park; Attendance: 4,206

2 May 1936 42	Clapton Orient	2–1	Cardiff City	London
	Goal		Freddie Hill	Stadium: Brisbane Road; Attendance: 5,460

=== FA Cup ===
30 November 1935 Round 1	Cardiff City	0–3	Dartford	Cardiff
			Goal	Stadium: Ninian Park; Attendance: 9,000

=== Welsh Cup ===
29 January 1936 Round 6	Cardiff City	2–1	Bristol City	Cardiff
	Reg Pugh; Reg Keating		Goal	Stadium: Ninian Park; Attendance: 6,000

12 March 1936 Quarter Final	Rhyl	2–1	Cardiff City	Rhyl
	Goal		Reg Pugh	Stadium: Belle Vue; Attendance: 7,000

=== Third Division South Cup ===
30 September 1935 Round 1	Crystal Palace	2–1	Cardiff City	London
	Goal		Jack Diamond	Stadium: Selhurst Park; Attendance: 8,000
