= 1934–35 Cardiff City F.C. season =

Welsh football club season

Cardiff City
1934–35 season
- Chairman: Dr Alex Brownle; Tudor Steer
- Manager: (Wales) Ben Watts-Jones
- Division Three South: 19th
- FA Cup: 1st round
- Welsh Cup: Quarter Finals
- Third Division South Cup: 1st round
- Top goalscorer: League: Reg Keating (19); All: Reg Keating (19)
- Highest home attendance: 18,608 (v Luton Town, 27 August 1934)
- Lowest home attendance: 5,053 (v Bournemouth, 6 October 1934)
- Average home league attendance: 9,908
Home colours

The 1934–35 season was Cardiff City F.C.'s 15th season in the Football League. They competed in the 22-team Division Three South, then the third tier of English football, finishing 19th.

== Season review ==
=== Football League Third Division South ===
==== Partial league table ====
Pos	Team	Pld	W	D	L	GF	GA	GAv	Pts	Promotion
17	Bournemouth & Boscombe Athletic	42	15	7	20	54	71	0.761	37	
18	Aldershot	42	13	10	19	50	75	0.667	36	
19	Cardiff City	42	13	9	20	62	82	0.756	35	
20	Gillingham	42	11	13	18	55	75	0.733	35	
21	Southend United	42	11	9	22	65	78	0.833	31	Re-elected

=== Results by round ===
Round	1	2	3	4	5	6	7	8	9	10	11	12	13	14	15	16	17	18	19	20	21	22	23	24	25	26	27	28	29	30	31	32	33	34	35	36	37	38	39	40	41	42
Ground	H	H	A	A	H	H	A	H	A	H	H	A	H	A	H	A	A	H	A	H	A	A	H	H	A	H	A	H	A	A	H	A	H	A	H	A	H	H	A	A	H	A
Result	W	W	L	L	W	W	L	L	L	W	D	W	L	D	D	D	W	L	L	D	L	L	W	L	D	D	L	D	L	L	W	L	D	L	W	L	W	W	L	L	W	L
Position	~	~	9	10	8	5	7	11	12	8	9	9	10	11	11	12	9	9	12	11	14	16	15	17	16	16	17	18	18	18	18	18	19	19	19	19	19	17	18	19	18	19
Points	2	4	4	4	6	8	8	8	8	10	11	13	13	14	15	16	18	18	18	19	19	19	21	21	22	23	23	24	24	24	26	26	27	27	29	29	31	33	33	33	35	35

A = Away; H = Home; W = Win; D = Draw; L = Loss

== Players ==
First team squad. Note: Flags indicate national team as defined under FIFA eligibility rules; some limited exceptions apply. Players may hold more than one non-FIFA nationality.

No.	Pos.	Nation	Player
--	GK	EIR	Tom Farquharson
--	GK	SCO	Jock Leckie
--	DF	ENG	Billy Bassett
--	DF	ENG	Harry Bland
--	DF	EIR	Jack Everest
--	DF	SCO	Jack Galbraith
--	DF	WAL	Arthur Granville
--	DF	ENG	Edward Lane
--	DF	WAL	Enoch Mort
--	MF	WAL	Len Attley
--	MF	ENG	Wally Jennings
--	MF	ENG	Peter Molloy
--	MF	WAL	Billy Moore

No.	Pos.	Nation	Player
--	MF	WAL	Tommy Vaughan
--	FW	WAL	Syd Fursland
--	FW	WAL	Phil Griffiths
--	FW	WAL	Stan Griffiths
--	FW	WAL	Freddie Hill
--	FW	ENG	Billy Jackson
--	FW	WAL	Glyn Jones
--	FW	ENG	Reg Keating
--	FW	WAL	Wilf Lewis
--	FW	WAL	Reg Pugh
--	FW	ENG	Harold Riley
--	FW	ENG	Fred Whitlow

== Fixtures and results ==
=== Third Division South ===
25 August 1934 1	Cardiff City	2–1	Charlton Athletic	Cardiff
	Reg Keating; Harold Riley		Goal	Stadium: Ninian Park; Attendance: 17,193

27 August 1934 2	Cardiff City	1–0	Luton Town	Cardiff
	Phil Griffiths 17'	Luton report		Stadium: Ninian Park; Attendance: 18,608; Referee: EC Mills (Warminster)

1 September 1934 3	Crystal Palace	6–1	Cardiff City	London
	Goal		Jack Everest	Stadium: Selhurst Park; Attendance: 17,641

3 September 1934 4	Luton Town	4–0	Cardiff City	Luton
18:30	George Martin (??); Sam Bell; Colin Cook 48'	Luton report		Stadium: Kenilworth Road; Attendance: 9,392; Referee: EC Mills (Warminster)

8 September 1934 5	Cardiff City	2–1	Queens Park Rangers	Cardiff
	Harold Riley; Reg Keating		Goal	Stadium: Ninian Park; Attendance: 12,663

10 September 1934 6	Cardiff City	2–0	Southend United	Cardiff
	Harold Riley; Reg Keating			Stadium: Ninian Park; Attendance: 11,922

15 September 1934 7	Torquay United	5–2	Cardiff City	Torquay
	Goal		Freddie Hill; Wilf Lewis	Stadium: Plainmoor; Attendance: 4,309

22 September 1934 8	Cardiff City	1–3	Swindon Town	Cardiff
	Phil Griffiths 65'		20' Frank Peters; 55' Rollo Jack; 80' Harry Bowl	Stadium: Ninian Park; Attendance: 7,111; Referee: WP Harper

29 September 1934 9	Aldershot	2–0	Cardiff City	Aldershot
	Goal			Stadium: Recreation Ground; Attendance: 4,996

6 October 1934 10	Cardiff City	2–1	Bournemouth	Cardiff
	Harold Riley; Billy Bassett		Goal	Stadium: Ninian Park; Attendance: 5,053

13 October 1934 11	Cardiff City	0–0	Brighton & Hove Albion	Cardiff
				Stadium: Ninian Park; Attendance: 8,957

20 October 1934 12	Watford	1–3	Cardiff City	Watford
	Goal		Freddie Hill; Tommy Vaughan; Tommy Vaughan	Stadium: Vicarage Road; Attendance: 7,844

27 October 1934 13	Cardiff City	3–4	Newport County	Cardiff
	Freddie Hill; Reg Keating; Tommy Vaughan		Charlie Whitehouse; Tommy Green; Billy Burgess; Reg Weaver	Stadium: Ninian Park; Attendance: 16,131

3 November 1934 14	Reading	1–1	Cardiff City	Reading
	Goal		Reg Keating	Stadium: Elm Park; Attendance: 8,272

10 November 1934 15	Cardiff City	2–2	Northampton Town	Cardiff
	Harold Riley; Freddie Hill		Goal	Stadium: Ninian Park; Attendance: 9,378

17 November 1934 16	Millwall	2–2	Cardiff City	London
	Goal		Reg Pugh; Reg Keating	Stadium: The Den; Attendance: 11,047

1 December 1934 17	Clapton Orient	0–1	Cardiff City	London
			Fred Whitlow	Stadium: Brisbane Road; Attendance: 8,145

8 December 1934 18	Cardiff City	0–2	Gillingham	Cardiff
			Goal	Stadium: Ninian Park; Attendance: 8,463

15 December 1934 19	Exeter City	2–1	Cardiff City	Exeter
	Goal		Reg Pugh	Stadium: St James Park; Attendance: 3,439

22 December 1934 20	Cardiff City	3–3	Bristol City	Cardiff
	Harold Riley; Billy Bassett; Reg Keating		Goal	Stadium: Ninian Park; Attendance: 7,043

26 December 1934 21	Southend United	2–1	Cardiff City	Southend
	Goal		Jack Galbraith	Stadium: Roots Hall; Attendance: 9,438

29 December 1934 22	Charlton Athletic	3–1	Cardiff City	London
	Goal		Reg Keating	Stadium: The Valley; Attendance: 12,101

5 January 1935 23	Cardiff City	2–0	Crystal Palace	Cardiff
	Ted Owens (o.g.); Reg Pugh			Stadium: Ninian Park; Attendance: 9,648

16 January 1935 24	Cardiff City	2–4	Coventry City	Cardiff
	Reg Keating; Reg Keating		Goal	Stadium: Ninian Park; Attendance: 7,235

19 January 1935 25	Queens Park Rangers	2–2	Cardiff City	London
	Goal		Freddie Hill; Reg Pugh	Stadium: Loftus Road; Attendance: 5,548

26 January 1935 26	Cardiff City	1–1	Torquay United	Cardiff
	Freddie Hill		Goal	Stadium: Ninian Park; Attendance: 8,034

2 February 1935 27	Swindon Town	2–1	Cardiff City	Swindon
	Alan Fowler 30'; Tommy Armstrong 37' (pen.)		45' (pen.) Jack Everest	Stadium: County Ground; Attendance: 6,043; Referee: WP Harper

9 February 1935 28	Cardiff City	1–1	Aldershot	Cardiff
	Freddie Hill		Goal	Stadium: Ninian Park; Attendance: 6,563

16 February 1935 29	Bournemouth	3–1	Cardiff City	Bournemouth
	Goal		(pen.) Jack Everest	Stadium: Dean Court; Attendance: 4,764

23 February 1935 30	Brighton & Hove Albion	3–1	Cardiff City	Brighton
	Goal		Reg Pugh	Stadium: Goldstone Ground; Attendance: 5,828

2 March 1935 31	Cardiff City	2–1	Watford	Cardiff
	Harold Riley; Wilf Lewis		Goal	Stadium: Ninian Park; Attendance: 9,247

9 March 1935 32	Newport County	4–0	Cardiff City	Newport
	Reg Weaver; Reg Weaver; Alfie Clarke; Alfie Clarke			Stadium: Somerton Park; Attendance: 8,461

16 March 1935 33	Cardiff City	1–1	Reading	Cardiff
	Stan Griffiths		Goal	Stadium: Ninian Park; Attendance: 8,684

23 March 1935 34	Northampton Town	3–0	Cardiff City	Northampton
	Goal			Stadium: County Ground; Attendance: 3,476

30 March 1935 35	Cardiff City	3–1	Millwall	Cardiff
	Wilf Lewis; Wilf Lewis; Len Attley		Goal	Stadium: Ninian Park; Attendance: 7,282

6 April 1935 36	Coventry City	2–0	Cardiff City	Coventry
	Goal			Stadium: Highfield Road; Attendance: 8,176

13 April 1935 37	Cardiff City	3–0	Clapton Orient	Cardiff
	Reg Keating; Wilf Lewis; Len Attley			Stadium: Ninian Park; Attendance: 7,453

19 April 1935 38	Cardiff City	4–1	Bristol Rovers	Cardiff
	Reg Keating; Reg Keating; Reg Pugh; Freddie Hill		Goal	Stadium: Ninian Park; Attendance: 14,392

20 April 1935 39	Gillingham	1–0	Cardiff City	Gillingham
	Goal			Stadium: Priestfield Stadium; Attendance: 5,820

22 April 1935 40	Bristol Rovers	3–2	Cardiff City	Bristol
	Goal		Reg Keating; Reg Keating	Stadium: Eastville; Attendance: 10,222

27 April 1935 41	Cardiff City	5–0	Exeter City	Cardiff
	Reg Keating; Reg Keating; Reg Keating; Reg Keating; Harry Webb (o.g.)			Stadium: Ninian Park; Attendance: 7,016

4 May 1935 42	Bristol City	4–0	Cardiff City	Bristol
	Albert Banfield; Ernie Brinton; Ted Harston; Leo Loftus			Stadium: Ashton Gate; Attendance: 5,558

=== FA Cup ===
24 November 1934 Round 1	Cardiff City	1–2	Reading	Cardiff
	Wilf Lewis		Goal	Stadium: Ninian Park; Attendance: 16,733

=== Welsh Cup ===
13 February 1935 Round 6	Cardiff City	3–2	Newport County	Cardiff
	Harold Riley; Harold Riley; Wilf Lewis		Tony Bird; Wally Reynolds	Stadium: Ninian Park; Attendance: 2,000

27 March 1935 Quarter Final	Cardiff City	2–2	Chester City	Cardiff
	Johnny Burke (o.g.); Jack Everest		Goal	Stadium: Ninian Park; Attendance: 2,000

10 April 1935 Quarter Final (Replay)	Chester City	3–0	Cardiff City	Chester
	Goal			Stadium: Sealand Road; Attendance: 5,000

=== Third Division South Cup ===
17 October 1934 Round 1	Crystal Palace	3–1	Cardiff City	London
	Goal		Tommy Vaughan	Stadium: Selhurst Park
