= Jack Haycox =

English footballer

Personal information
- Full name: Jack Haycox (Note: Some sources list Haycox as "John H" or "John Harold", but BMD records confirm that his only given name was Jack.)
- Date of birth: 7 May 1910
- Place of birth: Cheltenham, England
- Date of death: 21 July 1962 (aged 52)
- Place of death: Eye, Cambridgeshire, England
- Height: 5 ft 11 1/2 in (1.82 m)
- Position: Centre forward

Senior career*
Years	Team	Apps	(Gls)
- All Saints' Old Boys
1932	Evesham Town		
1932–1933	Cheltenham Town		(8)
1933	All Saints' Old Boys		
1934–1936	Newport County	13	(4)
1934	Cheltenham Town		
1936–1937	Bristol City	43	(25)
1937–1938	Torquay United	24	(12)
1938–1939	Northampton Town	17	(6)
1939–194?	Peterborough United		
- * Club domestic league appearances and goals

Jack Haycox (7 May 1910 – 21 July 1962) was an English footballer who scored 47 goals from 97 matches in the Football League playing for Newport County, Bristol City, Torquay United and Northampton Town. Primarily a centre forward, he also played non-league football for All Saints' Old Boys, Evesham Town, Cheltenham Town and Peterborough United.

== Personal life ==
Haycox was born in Cheltenham, Gloucestershire, in 1910, the twelfth child of Charles Haycox, a gardener, and his wife Phoebe, a monthly nurse. He attended Cheltenham Grammar School, which he represented at both football and cricket. He continued to play club cricket in the Cheltenham area for Templars and Marle Hill, and in 1947, appeared twice for Cambridgeshire in the Minor Counties Championship.

Haycox married Elsie Rimes at Fletton Church, Peterborough, in 1937. The couple settled in the Peterborough area; at the time of the 1939 Register, they were living with Elsie's parents in Old Fletton and Haycox was working as a packer for an engineering firm. Elsie died in 1944, and two years later, Haycox remarried, to Joan Burton. He died in Eye, near Peterborough, in 1962 at the age of 52.

== Amateur football career ==
Haycox began his football career with the Cheltenham-based junior club All Saints' Old Boys, and soon earned a reputation as a goalscorer. Against Naunton Park in February 1932, he scored six goals, the last of which was his fiftieth of the season. and despite missing a penalty, he scored to help All Saints' beat Woodchester 2–1 in the final of that year's Gloucestershire Northern Junior Cup. He signed amateur forms with Evesham Town in February 1932 and played for them in the Birmingham Combination, and in September, signed for another Birmingham Combination club, Cheltenham Town.

He continued to play for All Saints' until mid-April 1933, when he made a reportedly unexpected first-team debut for Cheltenham in a 3–2 win at home to Atherstone Town: he scored Cheltenham's second goal, which was also the team's 100th goal of the season. After he impressed in the next home game, Cheltenham's directors selected Haycox for the away match against Birmingham "A" (the third eleven of the Football League club). It was not a straightforward decision: Haycox suffered with travel sickness to the extent that, when playing away with All Saints', he had sometimes been unable to take the field until the second half. The club allowed him to travel to Birmingham by car in the hope it would ease the problem, and he performed well enough to keep his place, scored four in an eleven–nil defeat of Bournville Athletic, and finished the season with eight goals from rather fewer matches.

Again, Haycox returned to All Saints, and continued to score freely in the 1933–34 season, with 41 goals by the end of November. Invited for a trial by Football League Third Division South club Newport County, he scored the third goal and was instrumental in another as Newport's reserves beat Merthyr Town 4–0 in the Southern League. After he followed up with three goals against Ebbw Vale in a Welsh League fixture, Haycox signed for Newport, but chose to retain his amateur status rather than turning professional. He made his Football League debut against Aldershot on 20 January 1934, and on his second appearance, against Swindon Town in the Third Division South Cup, Haycox scored twice and set up three goals for other players. According to the News Chronicle, the "powerfully-built lad from Cheltenham displayed wiles beyond his years, and allied to this were real snappiness and speed and quick shooting." Haycox returned to Cheltenham Town in mid-March, and scored 15 goals from 18 matches in what remained of the season.

== Professional football career ==
In June 1934, he signed for Newport County as a professional. Illness and injury delayed his introduction to the league team until mid-October, and he spent a lengthy period in the reserves, returning to the first eleven to score in a 2–1 win against Queens Park Rangers in April 1935. Haycox was retained for the 1935–36 season, but knee cartilage trouble requiring surgery kept him out of consideration until the new year. It was reported that his absence had disappointed "two prominent clubs, one from the First Division", who had been interested in watching him. He made no more first-team appearances for Newport, but scored 22 goals for the reserves by the end of the season.

In May 1936, Haycox signed for another Third Division South club, Bristol City. He made his first-team debut in the final of the Gloucestershire Senior Cup against Bristol Rovers, in which he scored the only goal. He did well in the reserves, including in an experimental spell at outside right rather than his customary centre-forward position, but was unable to force himself into the league team until January 1937, when several players were out with influenza. He scored City's third goal in a 4–1 win against Bristol Rovers on 2 January, added two goals in the next match, against Torquay United, and scored yet again in a 2–2 draw with Watford a few days later, when he "gave another encouraging display as leader of the attack, infusing plenty of dash into his play, and shooting at every opportunity. Frequently he caught the opposition unawares wandering out of position". He continued in similar vein: by mid-March, he had twelve goals from ten matches, and had failed to score in only one of those ten.

Despite interest from Liverpool, which perhaps prompted his delay in re-signing for City, he stayed with the club, and scored their first goal of the new season, in a 3–1 win against Gillingham. Away to Notts County, Haycox was deprived of a goal when his shot was deemed to have entered the goal moments after the referee whistled for time. Former England international player turned journalist Charles Buchan opined that "no referee can judge the 90 minutes to a fraction of a second" so "it would be fairer all round if the game went on until the ball became dead." At the start of 1938, he lost his place to youngster Alfie Rowles, and on 16 February, he signed for Torquay United. He had scored 31 goals in 49 matches in first-team competition, 25 from 43 in the league.

Haycox scored on his Torquay debut, and played regularly for what remained of the season. He was retained for the 1938–39 season, and in September scored a hat-trick against his former club Bristol City. By mid-October, he was the leading scorer in the Third Division South with ten goals. In November, he signed for Northampton Town; as part of the deal, another forward, Ralph Allen, moved in the other direction, and it was later reported that Northampton also paid a fee of £750. After injury disrupted the start of his Northampton career, Haycox opened his scoring account with a hat-trick against Torquay United on 24 December, but as the season wore on a combination of loss of form and manager Warney Cresswell's decision to bring young players through to the first team meant that by April he was playing in the reserves and listed for transfer at £250.

He returned to non-league football with Peterborough United of the Midland League in August 1939. He scored five goals in the three matches played before the Midland League proper was abandoned on the outbreak of the Second World War, and added another fifteen from eleven appearances in the emergency competition.

== Career statistics ==
Appearances and goals by club, season and competition
Club	Season	League			FA Cup		Third Division South Cup		Total	
Club	Season	Division	Apps	Goals	Apps	Goals	Apps	Goals	Apps	Goals
Newport County	1933–34	Third Division South	2	1	—		2	2	4	3
Newport County	1934–35	Third Division South	11	3	0	0	0	0	11	3
Newport County	1935–36	Third Division South	0	0	0	0	0	0	0	0
Newport County	Total		13	4	0	0	2	2	15	6
Bristol City	1936–37	Third Division South	24	17	0	0	0	0	24	17
Bristol City	1937–38	Third Division South	19	8	3	2	3	2	25	12
Bristol City	Total		43	25	3	2	3	2	49	29
Torquay United	1937–38	Third Division South	12	2	—		—		12	2
Torquay United	1938–39	Third Division South	12	10	—		—		12	10
Torquay United	Total		24	12	0	0	0	0	24	12
Northampton Town	1938–39	Third Division South	17	6	1	0	1	0	19	6
Career totals			97	47	4	2	6	4	107	53
