= Lily Eskelsen García =

American teacher and trade union leader

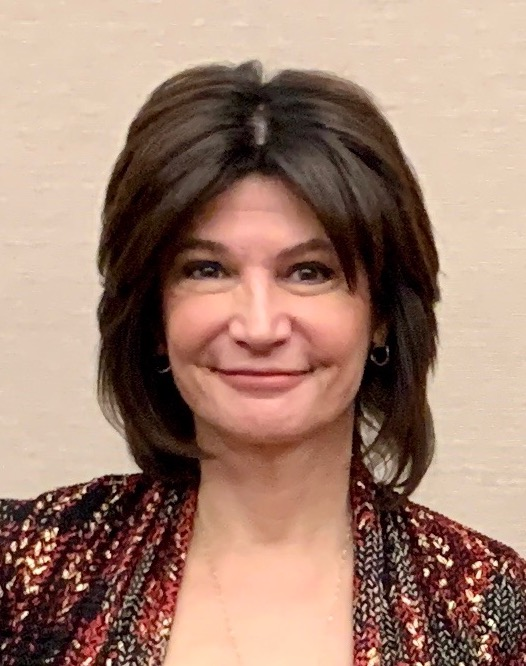

President of the National Education Association
- In office September 1, 2014 – September 1, 2020
- Preceded by: Dennis Van Roekel
- Succeeded by: Rebecca S. Pringle

Personal details
- Born: Lilia Laura Pace; May 1, 1955 (age 71) Fort Hood, Texas, U.S.
- Party: Democratic
- Spouses: Ruel Eskelsen (died 2011) Alberto Garcia (m. 2016)
- Children: 2
- Education: University of Utah (BA, MS)

Lily Eskelsen García (née Pace; born May 1, 1955) is an American teacher and labor union leader. She served as president of the National Education Association from 2014 to 2020, becoming the first Latina to lead the organization. The NEA, with approximately three million members, is the largest labor union in the United States."

== Early life and education ==
Lily Eskelsen García was born Lilia Laura Pace on May 1, 1955, in Fort Hood, Texas. Her father was in the United States Army. Her mother is from Panama. Her family moved between Army posts across the country every two years. In an interview with Colorín Colorado, Eskelsen García said her mother chose not to teach her Spanish as a child because of the discrimination she had faced as a Panamanian immigrant.

Eskelsen García began her career as a cafeteria worker, and then as an aide to a special education teacher. At this teacher's suggestion, she went back to school to pursue a teaching degree. She worked her way through the University of Utah on scholarships, student loans, and as a starving folk singer, graduating magna cum laude in elementary education and later earning her master's degree in instructional technology.

== Teaching ==
In 1980, Eskelsen García went to work teaching fourth, fifth, and sixth grades at Orchard Elementary in the Granite School District in Utah. In 1989, she was named Utah Teacher of the Year. Later, while in union leadership positions, she taught homeless children in a single classroom at Salt Lake City's homeless shelter and the Christmas Box House Children's Shelter, a kindergarten through 6th grade one-room public school serving hard-to-place foster children in Salt Lake City.

== Labor leadership ==
The press coverage she received as a result of the Teacher of the Year award encouraged her to run for office, and in 1990, she won a write-in election as president of the Utah Education Association, an affiliate of the National Education Association (NEA). One of her initiatives as president was to organize the Children at Risk Foundation; she served as its first president. She also served as president of Utah Retirement Systems.

In 1996, she was elected to the NEA executive committee. In 2002, she was elected NEA Secretary-Treasurer with 78 percent of the vote, the first time a four-candidate race was decided on the first ballot. She served two three-year terms as treasurer, under NEA president Reg Weaver. On July 4, 2008, she was elected NEA vice-president, and she was re-elected at the 2011 NEA Representative Assembly with over 90% of the vote. At the 2014 NEA Representative Assembly in Denver, Colorado, she was elected NEA President and served as NEA president until September 1, 2020, when she was succeeded by Becky Pringle.

In September 2008, Eskelsen García addressed the Congressional Hispanic Caucus Institute Public Policy Conference. Her education advice for parents has been published in Time, Working Mother, and Woman's World, and she has been featured on Fox News's Hannity & Colmes and CNN's Lou Dobbs Tonight. She has been the invited keynote speaker for hundreds of education events across the United States and was highlighted by Education World in their "Best Conference Speakers" edition. She writes a blog, "Lily's Blackboard," covering the latest education issues.

Her union leadership has included writing protest songs, such as one about the No Child Left Behind Act. As vice president, she was part of NEA's emphasis on working with the American labor movement; she appeared in Washington, D.C. on December 10, 2009, with labor leaders from the Teamsters and the AFL-CIO to speak out against taxing health-care benefits.

== Politics and controversy ==
In 1998, she was the first Hispanic person to be chosen as the Democratic Party's nominee for a U.S. congressional seat in Utah, raising almost $1 million, and receiving 45% of the vote, ultimately losing to incumbent Merrill Cook in the general election.

In 2000, she served as a member of President Bill Clinton's White House Strategy Session on Improving Hispanic Education, and in 2011, President Obama named her a member of the President's Advisory Commission on Educational Excellence for Hispanics.

In November 2015, Eskelsen Garcia received backlash for comments she made during the Campaign for America's Future Awards Gala. During a speech, she said, "We diversify our curriculum instruction to meet the personal individual needs of all of our students, the blind, the hearing impaired, the physically challenged, the gifted and talented, the chronically tarded and the medically annoying." Several organizations, including the American Association of People with Disabilities and National Down Syndrome Society, called on her to apologize and asked for more open dialogue regarding students with disabilities. Eskelsen Garcia apologized on her blog, saying she had misspoken while trying to be funny; she had meant to say "chronically tardy", and by "medically annoying" she had meant those who use their own problems to purposefully disrupt class, rather than those with medical issues.

In 2016, Eskelsen Garcia campaigned for Hillary Clinton. She spoke at the 2016 Democratic National Convention.

After the inauguration of Donald Trump, she described him and the nominee for Secretary of Education Betsy DeVos as having an agenda to "profitize, privatize and ... throw a middle-class child into the street saying, 'Let them eat for-profit vouchers.'" More than 1 million emails opposing DeVos' nomination were generated through NEA's online form. Eskelsen Garcia continued to oppose the administration's budget priorities in 2018, calling the proposed 13.5% cut in education spending a "wrecking ball" aimed at public schools.

In 2020, Eskelsen Garcia was instrumental in the NEA's endorsement of 2020 presidential candidate Joe Biden in the primary and general elections. However, some union members stated their voices weren't heard, as "the rank and file were not asked who they wanted to support".

In 2020, García was named a candidate for Secretary of Education in the Biden administration, but Connecticut education commissioner Miguel Cardona was chosen instead. She is reported to have a close working relationship with First Lady Jill Biden, fellow NEA member and educator.

== Post-NEA career ==
After stepping down as NEA president in 2020, Eskelsen García continued to represent educators internationally through Education International. She is pursuing a doctorate in Teaching, Learning and Culture. She founded Maestros Para Los Niños, an endowed scholarship program at the University of Utah for bilingual aspiring teachers. She serves on the boards of the Congressional Hispanic Caucus Institute and the Economic Policy Institute.

== Personal life ==
After high school, Lily married Ruel Eskelsen, with whom she had two children before his death on March 18, 2011. She is currently married to graphic artist Alberto García, with whom she co-authored and illustrated Rabble Rousers: Fearless Fighters for Social Justice (2014), a bilingual children's book whose proceeds support scholarships for undocumented Dreamers.
