= 1933–34 Newport County A.F.C. season =

Welsh association football club season

Newport County
1933–34 season
- Manager: Jimmy Hindmarsh
- Stadium: Somerton Park
- Third Division South: 18th
- FA Cup: 2nd round
- Third Division South Cup: 2nd round
- Welsh Cup: 7th round
- Top goalscorer: League: Higgins/Reed (10); All: Higgins (12)
- Highest home attendance: 10,438 vs Cardiff City (10 March 1934)
- Lowest home attendance: 3,522 vs Bristol Rovers (16 December 1933)
- Average home league attendance: 6,066
Home colours	Away colours

The 1933–34 season was Newport County's second consecutive season in the Third Division South and their 13th in the Football League.

== Season review ==
=== Results summary ===
Overall								Home						Away					
Pld	W	D	L	GF	GA	GAv	Pts	W	D	L	GF	GA	Pts	W	D	L	GF	GA	Pts
42	8	17	17	49	70	0.7	33	6	9	6	25	23	21	2	8	11	24	47	12

Source: rsssf.com

=== Results by round ===
Round	1	2	3	4	5	6	7	8	9	10	11	12	13	14	15	16	17	18	19	20	21	22	23	24	25	26	27	28	29	30	31	32	33	34	35	36	37	38	39	40	41	42
Ground	H	A	A	H	H	A	H	A	H	A	H	A	H	A	H	H	H	A	H	A	A	H	A	A	H	A	H	A	H	A	H	A	A	H	H	A	A	H	A	H	A	H
Result	L	L	D	D	L	D	W	W	L	L	W	D	D	L	L	D	W	D	D	D	D	D	L	L	L	L	D	L	W	D	D	W	D	D	D	L	L	L	L	W	L	W
Position	15	18	18	17	21	20	18	16	19	20	20	19	18	18	21	20	18	18	18	17	16	15	17	18	19	20	21	21	20	20	20	17	18	18	17	18	18	20	20	20	19	18

Updated to match(es) played on 5 May 1934. Source: statto.com
A = Away; H = Home; W = Win; D = Draw; L = Loss

== Fixtures and results ==
=== Third Division South ===
Date	Opponents	Venue	Result	Scorers	Attendance
26 Aug 1933	Swindon Town	H	1–2	Burgess	8,871
28 Aug 1933	Clapton Orient	A	0–3		6,675
2 Sep 1933	Brighton & Hove Albion	A	1–1	Smith	6,878
4 Sep 1933	Clapton Orient	H	1–1	Millar	5,894
9 Sep 1933	Aldershot	H	1–2	Barklam	6,760
16 Sep 1933	Luton Town	A	1–1	Higgins	10,072
23 Sep 1933	Northampton Town	H	2–0	Higgins, Taylor	4,842
30 Sep 1933	Torquay United	A	2–1	Higgins, Taylor	3,729
7 Oct 1933	Queens Park Rangers	H	1–2	Taylor	7,463
14 Oct 1933	Gillingham	A	0–1		4,630
21 Oct 1933	Exeter City	H	1–0	Taylor	7,562
28 Oct 1933	Cardiff City	A	1–1	John	16,175
4 Nov 1933	Bournemouth & Boscombe Athletic	H	1–1	Reynolds	7,079
11 Nov 1933	Charlton Athletic	A	1–6	Taylor	9,771
18 Nov 1933	Watford	H	0–3		5,301
2 Dec 1933	Coventry City	H	0–0		3,672
16 Dec 1933	Bristol Rovers	H	1–0	Reynolds	3,522
23 Dec 1933	Crystal Palace	A	1–1	Higgins	10,755
25 Dec 1933	Bristol City	H	2–2	Higgins 2	8,039
26 Dec 1933	Bristol City	A	1–1	OG	16,836
30 Dec 1933	Swindon Town	A	1–1	Burgess	7,809
6 Jan 1934	Brighton & Hove Albion	H	2–2	Higgins, Jones	4,694
17 Jan 1934	Reading	A	0–4		4,608
20 Jan 1934	Aldershot	A	2–3	Higgins 2	4,253
27 Jan 1934	Luton Town	H	1–2	Haycox	5,524
3 Feb 1934	Northampton Town	A	3–5	Thomas 2, Reynolds	5,048
10 Feb 1934	Torquay United	H	0–0		4,680
17 Feb 1934	Queens Park Rangers	A	1–2	Reed	7,278
24 Feb 1934	Gillingham	H	3–1	Reed 2, Burgess	3,589
3 Mar 1934	Exeter City	A	1–1	Reed	4,903
10 Mar 1934	Cardiff City	H	2–2	Reynolds, Burgess	10,438
14 Mar 1934	Southend United	A	5–3	Reed 4, OG	2,580
17 Mar 1934	Bournemouth & Boscombe Athletic	A	0–0		3,402
24 Mar 1934	Charlton Athletic	H	1–1	W.Clarke	5,909
30 Mar 1934	Norwich City	H	0–0		8,965
31 Mar 1934	Watford	A	0–3		5,675
2 Apr 1934	Norwich City	A	1–2	Reed	22,433
7 Apr 1934	Reading	H	1–2	Taylor	5,924
14 Apr 1934	Coventry City	A	2–5	Burgess, Higgins	10,424
21 Apr 1934	Southend United	H	3–0	Green 2, Reed	4,728
28 Apr 1934	Bristol Rovers	A	0–2		4,749
5 May 1934	Crystal Palace	H	1–0	Green	3,930

=== FA Cup ===
Round	Date	Opponents	Venue	Result	Scorers	Attendance
1	25 Nov 1933	Dulwich Hamlet	A	2–2	Burgess, Higgins	11,500
1r	30 Nov 1933	Dulwich Hamlet	H	6–2	Burgess 2, Taylor 2, Reynolds, Thomas	4,500
2	9 Dec 1933	Workington	A	1–3	Thomas	8,000

=== Third Division South Cup ===
Round	Date	Opponents	Venue	Result	Scorers	Attendance
1	25 Jan 1934	Swindon Town	H	7–2		
2	22 Feb 1934	Brighton & Hove Albion	H	0–1		

=== Welsh Cup ===
Round	Date	Opponents	Venue	Result	Scorers	Attendance
5	4 Jan 1934	Lovells Athletic	A	3–1	Bowsher, Green, Haycox	
6	1 Feb 1934	Crewe Alexandra	H	2–2	Higgins, Green	2,000
6r	7 Feb 1934	Crewe Alexandra	A	5–4	Reynolds, Thomas, Green, Haycox, A. Clarke	2,000
7	1 Mar 1934	Tranmere Rovers	H	1–1	Haycox	2,000
7r	8 Mar 1934	Tranmere Rovers	A	2–5	Griffiths, Wolliscroft	

== League table ==
Pos	Team	Pld	W	D	L	F	A	GA	Pts
1	Norwich City	42	25	11	6	88	49	1.796	61
2	Coventry City	42	21	12	9	100	54	1.852	54
3	Reading	42	21	12	9	82	50	1.640	54
4	Queens Park Rangers	42	24	6	12	70	51	1.373	54
5	Charlton Athletic	42	22	8	12	83	56	1.482	52
6	Luton Town	42	21	10	11	83	61	1.361	52
7	Bristol Rovers	42	20	11	11	77	47	1.638	51
8	Swindon Town	42	17	11	14	64	68	0.941	45
9	Exeter City	42	16	11	15	68	57	1.193	43
10	Brighton & Hove Albion	42	15	13	14	68	60	1.133	43
11	Clapton Orient	42	16	10	16	75	69	1.087	42
12	Crystal Palace	42	16	9	17	71	67	1.060	41
13	Northampton Town	42	14	12	16	71	78	0.910	40
14	Aldershot	42	13	12	17	52	71	0.732	38
15	Watford	42	15	7	20	71	63	1.127	37
16	Southend United	42	12	10	20	51	74	0.689	34
17	Gillingham	42	11	11	20	75	96	0.781	33
18	Newport County	42	8	17	17	49	70	0.700	33
19	Bristol City	42	10	13	19	58	85	0.682	33
20	Torquay United	42	13	7	22	53	93	0.570	33
21	Bournemouth & Boscombe Athletic	42	9	9	24	60	102	0.588	27
22	Cardiff City	42	9	6	27	57	105	0.543	24

Key	
	Division Champions
	Re-elected
	Failed re-election
