= 1934–35 Newport County A.F.C. season =

Welsh association football club season

Newport County
1934–35 season
- Manager: Jimmy Hindmarsh
- Stadium: Somerton Park
- Third Division South: 22nd (re-elected)
- FA Cup: 1st round
- Third Division South Cup: 1st round
- Welsh Cup: 6th round
- Top goalscorer: League: Bird (16); All: Bird (17)
- Highest home attendance: 10,978 vs Bristol City (1 September 1934)
- Lowest home attendance: 2,399 vs Reading (28 February 1935)
- Average home league attendance: 5,186
Home colours	Away colours

The 1934–35 season was Newport County's third consecutive season in the Third Division South and their 14th in the Football League. The season started with three straight wins and the club found itself top of the table after the first match. However, with 18 defeats in the last half of the season County were forced into the re-election process for the fourth time, but were comfortably re-elected.

== Season review ==
=== Results summary ===
Overall								Home						Away					
Pld	W	D	L	GF	GA	GAv	Pts	W	D	L	GF	GA	Pts	W	D	L	GF	GA	Pts
42	10	5	27	54	112	0.482	25	7	4	10	36	40	18	3	1	17	18	72	7

Source: rsssf.com

=== Results by round ===
Round	1	2	3	4	5	6	7	8	9	10	11	12	13	14	15	16	17	18	19	20	21	22	23	24	25	26	27	28	29	30	31	32	33	34	35	36	37	38	39	40	41	42
Ground	A	H	H	A	A	H	A	H	A	H	H	A	H	A	H	H	A	H	A	H	A	H	A	A	H	A	H	A	A	H	A	H	A	H	A	H	A	H	H	A	A	H
Result	W	W	W	L	L	W	L	D	L	L	W	W	D	W	L	L	L	W	D	L	L	L	L	L	L	L	D	L	L	D	L	W	L	L	L	W	L	L	L	L	L	L
Position	1	1	2	2	5	5	9	9	12	16	12	9	10	7	11	13	13	11	12	13	15	17	18	18	19	19	19	19	21	21	21	21	21	21	21	21	22	22	22	22	22	22

Updated to match(es) played on 5 May 1935. Source: statto.com
A = Away; H = Home; W = Win; D = Draw; L = Loss

== Fixtures and results ==
=== Third Division South ===
Date	Opponents	Venue	Result	Scorers	Attendance
25 Aug 1934	Exeter City	A	1–0	Bird	8,295
27 Aug 1934	Bournemouth & Boscombe Athletic	H	6–1	Bird 2, Burgess 2, Higgins, Green	7,651
1 Sep 1934	Bristol City	H	2–0	Higgins, Bird	10,978
5 Sep 1934	Bournemouth & Boscombe Athletic	A	1–3	Bird	5,722
8 Sep 1934	Millwall	A	0–2		16,142
15 Sep 1934	Coventry City	H	2–1	Bird, Weaver	10,580
22 Sep 1934	Clapton Orient	A	0–4		4,715
29 Sep 1934	Gillingham	H	2–2	Bird 2	5,460
6 Oct 1934	Reading	A	1–6	Bird	8,074
13 Oct 1934	Northampton Town	H	1–3	Bird	6,365
20 Oct 1934	Brighton & Hove Albion	H	1–0	OG	3,696
27 Oct 1934	Cardiff City	A	4–3	Whitehouse, Green, Burgess, Weaver	16,131
3 Nov 1934	Bristol Rovers	H	1–1	Bird	7,146
10 Nov 1934	Southend United	A	1–0	Bird	5,498
17 Nov 1934	Torquay United	H	1–4	Bird	6,185
1 Dec 1934	Crystal Palace	H	2–3	Thomas, Cook	4,317
8 Dec 1934	Charlton Athletic	A	0–6		10,186
15 Dec 1934	Aldershot	H	2–0	Bird, White	3,155
22 Dec 1934	Swindon Town	A	0–0		6,121
25 Dec 1934	Watford	H	0–1		7,290
26 Dec 1934	Watford	A	0–7		11,695
29 Dec 1934	Exeter City	H	1–3	Bird	4,174
5 Jan 1935	Bristol City	A	1–2	Thomas	8,968
12 Jan 1935	Queens Park Rangers	A	1–4	Burgess	4,511
19 Jan 1935	Millwall	H	1–2	White	2,948
26 Jan 1935	Coventry City	A	0–5		11,525
2 Feb 1935	Clapton Orient	H	3–3	Clarke 2, Bird	2,738
9 Feb 1935	Gillingham	A	0–5		3,689
23 Feb 1935	Northampton Town	A	0–2		2,925
28 Feb 1935	Reading	H	2–2	Weaver 2	2,399
2 Mar 1935	Brighton & Hove Albion	A	1–3	Reynolds	5,687
9 Mar 1935	Cardiff City	H	4–0	Weaver 2, Clarke 2	8,461
16 Mar 1935	Bristol Rovers	A	3–5	Burgess, Perks, Clarke	6,306
23 Mar 1935	Southend United	H	0–5		3,005
30 Mar 1935	Torquay United	A	1–2	White	2,941
6 Apr 1935	Queens Park Rangers	H	2–1	Weaver, Haycox	2,912
13 Apr 1935	Crystal Palace	A	0–6		8,323
19 Apr 1935	Luton Town	H	2–4	Haycox 2	4,052
20 Apr 1935	Charlton Athletic	H	0–2		3,287
22 Apr 1935	Luton Town	A	1–4	Weaver	8,759
27 Apr 1935	Aldershot	A	2–3	Thomas 2	2,810
4 May 1935	Swindon Town	H	1–2	Thomas	2,110

=== FA Cup ===
Round	Date	Opponents	Venue	Result	Scorers	Attendance
1	24 Nov 1934	Swindon Town	A	0–4		12,776

=== Third Division South Cup ===
Round	Date	Opponents	Venue	Result	Scorers	Attendance
1	22 Oct 1934	Northampton Town	A	0–3		2,500

=== Welsh Cup ===
Round	Date	Opponents	Venue	Result	Scorers	Attendance
6	13 Feb 1935	Cardiff City	A	2–3	Bird, Reynolds	2,000

== League table ==
Pos	Team	Pld	W	D	L	F	A	GA	Pts
1	Charlton Athletic	42	27	7	8	103	52	1.981	61
2	Reading	42	21	11	10	89	65	1.369	53
3	Coventry City	42	21	9	12	86	50	1.720	51
4	Luton Town	42	19	12	11	92	60	1.533	50
5	Crystal Palace	42	19	10	13	86	64	1.344	48
6	Watford	42	19	9	14	76	49	1.551	47
7	Northampton Town	42	19	8	15	65	67	0.970	46
8	Bristol Rovers	42	17	10	15	73	77	0.948	44
9	Brighton & Hove Albion	42	17	9	16	69	62	1.113	43
10	Torquay United	42	18	6	18	81	75	1.080	42
11	Exeter City	42	16	9	17	70	75	0.933	41
12	Millwall	42	17	7	18	57	62	0.919	41
13	Queens Park Rangers	42	16	9	17	63	72	0.875	41
14	Clapton Orient	42	15	10	17	65	65	1.000	40
15	Bristol City	42	15	9	18	52	68	0.765	39
16	Swindon Town	42	13	12	17	67	78	0.859	38
17	Bournemouth & Boscombe Athletic	42	15	7	20	54	71	0.761	37
18	Aldershot	42	13	10	19	50	75	0.667	36
19	Cardiff City	42	13	9	20	62	82	0.756	35
20	Gillingham	42	11	13	18	55	75	0.733	35
21	Southend United	42	11	9	22	65	78	0.833	31
22	Newport County	42	10	5	27	54	112	0.482	25

Key	
	Division Champions
	Re-elected
	Failed re-election

=== Election ===
Votes	Club	Fate
48	Southend United	Re-elected to the League
43	Newport County	Re-elected to the League
1	Bath City	Not elected to the League
1	Folkestone	Not elected to the League
