= Dennis Van Roekel =

American labor leader

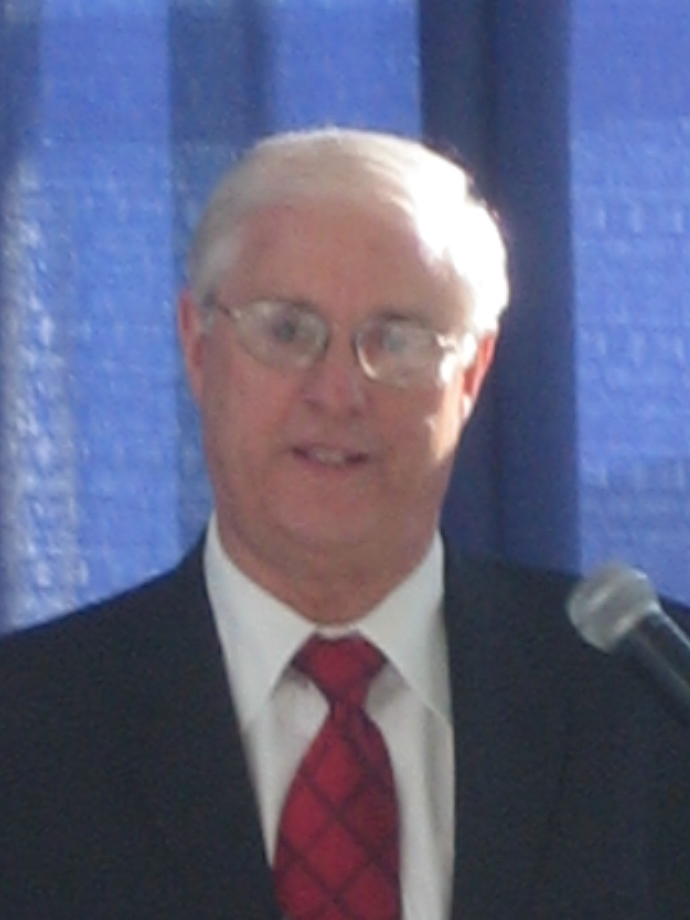
- Roekel in 2008
- Born: Le Mars, Iowa, United States
- Occupations: Trade union leader; Teacher
- Known for: Former President, National Education Association Former president, Arizona Education Association

Dennis Van Roekel is an American labor leader who served as president of the National Education Association, the largest labor union in the United States.

== Background ==
Van Roekel was born in Le Mars, Iowa. He earned a Bachelor of Arts degree from the University of Iowa in Iowa City and a master's degree in math education from Northern Arizona University in Flagstaff. He taught math for more than 20 years at Paradise Valley High School in Phoenix, Arizona. He has held key positions in all levels of the teachers union, including Paradise Valley Education Association President, Arizona Education Association President, and served two terms as NEA Secretary-Treasurer, and NEA Vice President. He was elected NEA President by the 2008 NEA Representative Assembly, succeeding Reg Weaver in that position.

Dennis Van Roekel is a recognized activist on children education who has testified in front of United States Congress on education policy.

== Presidency ==
As NEA President, Van Roekel has been a vocal supporter of the broader union movement. He gave a speech calling for unity at a meeting in January 2009 with the leaders of the AFL-CIO and the breakaway Change to Win; The New York Times called his attendance at that meeting "somewhat surprising" since the NEA has been more independent in the past. He has been outspoken about the neediest schools in the country, and has testified before Congress that union staffing rules would not stand in the way of putting the best teachers in high-needs schools.

He was succeeded on September 1, 2014 by Lily Eskelsen García.
