= Freddie Hill =

Freddie Hill may refer to:

- Fred Hill (footballer, born 1940), English footballer
- Freddie Hill (footballer, born 1914) (1914–?), Welsh footballer
