= Edward Lane =

Edward Lane may refer to:

- Edward Lane (1584–1650), alias for Richard Lane, Chief Baron of the Exchequer
- Edward William Lane (1801–1876), British Orientalist, translator and lexicographer
- Edward Lane (Illinois politician) (1842–1912), American lawyer, judge and U.S. Representative from Illinois
- Edward Lane (footballer) (born 1908), English footballer
- Edward E. Lane (1924–2009), Virginia lawyer and politician
