= PEHP Health & Benefits =

Agency overview
- Formed: 1977
- Headquarters: 560 East 200 South Salt Lake City, Utah
- Employees: 200
- Agency executive: R. Chet Loftis, Managing Director
- Website: www.pehp.org

PEHP Health & Benefits, known as Public Employees Health Program or simply PEHP, is a division of Utah Retirement Systems and administers Utah's public employees medical, dental, life, and long-term disability benefits. PEHP is governed through Title 49 of the Utah Code.

PEHP covers 170,000 members through self-funded arrangements and holds funds in trust for the benefit of covered individuals and groups. The claims risk is largely assumed by the participating employers. When claims are lower than expected, excess reserves are built, then used to benefit the participants. PEHP returned close to $100 million in reserves to participants over the decade ending in 2020.

PEHP provides a variety of health plans with traditional copays, coinsurance, Medicare Supplement, and consumer-driven plans using Health Savings Accounts and Health Reimbursement Accounts across multiple networks in Utah.

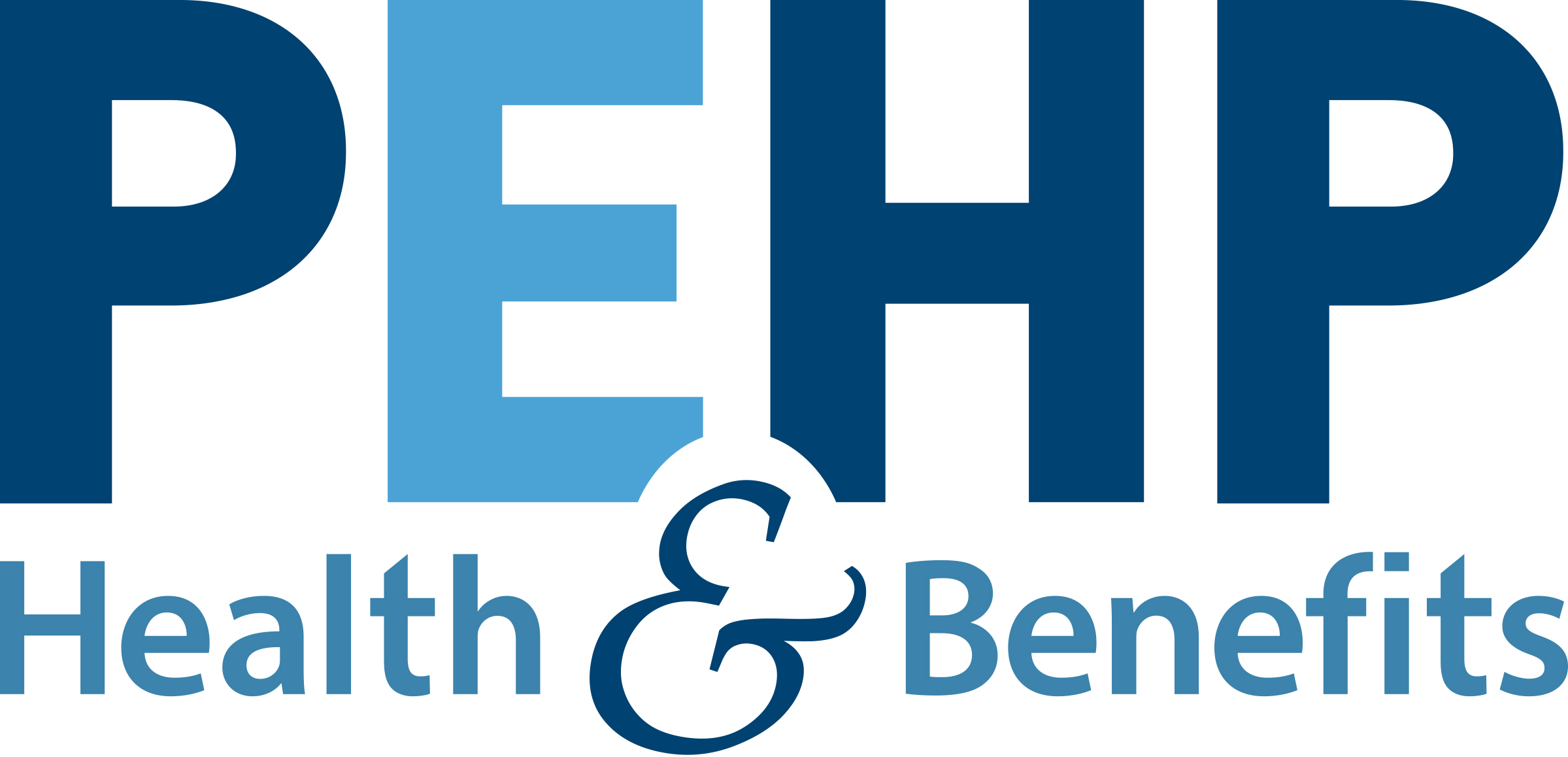
Company identity and logo.

== History ==
In 1965, the State of Utah began administration of the Group Insurance Program for public employees. The administration of the program was overseen by Paul Wiser with the help of 3 employees working out of the Utah State Capitol. The program provided three benefits for employees of the State of Utah and University of Utah: 1. A health plan underwritten by Prudential Insurance 2. A life plan underwritten by Ideal National Life 3. Accidental Death and Dismemberment benefit underwritten by Continental Agency.

In 1976, the Group Insurance office moved from the Utah Capitol Complex to 450 South 900 East in Salt Lake City with Linn J. Baker as the Director of Public Employees Health Program.

The Group Insurance office moved to share space with Utah Retirement Systems in 1977 and the operating structure changed. Governor Scott M. Matheson helped transform the group insurance program to a self-funded trust arrangement. The Utah Legislature unanimously passed SB 172 "Utah State Retirement Office Act Amendments" to establish PEHP with the purpose to "provide its employees group health, medical, disability, and life insurance in the most economical and efficient manner..." Utah was the first state to implement a self-insurance program.

During the 1980s, PEHP evolved and expanded benefit offerings. The Healthy Utah program was created in 1982 through the Governor's Task Force on Cost Containment to address statistics of Utahns general health and fitness discovered by the Utah Department of Health. The Utah Public Employees Disability Act created the long term disability program at PEHP, covering two-thirds of the disabled employee's salary. To address rising costs, a Preferred Provider Organization network was created and provider fees were lowered in exchange for driving volume. With the success of the PPO medical network, a new dental plan was introduced and in 1988 and became one of the first dental PPO networks in the country.

The 1990s saw increase in claims volume and new technologies and solutions. Electronic claims submission helped automate and speed up the Medical Billing process when first introduced at PEHP in 1996. The pharmacy benefits were administered in-house until 1998, when MerkMedco became the Pharmacy Benefit Manager.

Health care costs continue to increase faster than general inflation in the Utah. By 2010, PEHP was collecting over a half billion dollars annually to cover the cost of health care. New tools and payment models were introduced, including new provider payment models, value providers and telemedicine.

By 2013, PEHP became the first Utah company to offer complete health care rate transparency through their Cost & Quality tools. To further encourage use of the cost transparency tools and drive health care costs lower, PEHP implemented a Cash Back Program, where PEHP members share in the savings by getting medical procedures and imaging done at lower costing facilities. In 2019, Cash Back expanded to pharmacy, where participants could travel to Mexico or Canada to get the same drug at a fraction of the cost

In 2020, Utah Representative Norm Thurston ran HB 207 to lower the cost of insulin for Utahns and directed PEHP to create the Insulin Savings Program. This program is available to all Utah residents and helps those who are uninsured or underinsured by providing them access to insulin at PEHP's cost, which is two-thirds lower than retail pricing.
