= Danny Canning =

Welsh footballer

Personal information
- Full name: Leslie Daniel Canning
- Date of birth: 21 February 1926
- Place of birth: Penrhiwceiber, Wales
- Date of death: 30 June 2014 (aged 88)
- Position: Goalkeeper

Senior career*
Years	Team	Apps	(Gls)
1945–1949	Cardiff City	80	(0)
1949–1951	Swansea Town	47	(0)
1951–1952	Nottingham Forest	5	(0)
- * Club domestic league appearances and goals

Leslie Daniel Canning (21 February 1926 – 30 June 2014) was a Welsh professional footballer. A goalkeeper, he made over 100 appearances in The Football League during spells with Cardiff City, Swansea Town and Nottingham Forest and won promotion from the Third Division South twice in three years between 1947 and 1949 for Cardiff and Swansea.

== Career ==
Canning was born in Penrhiwceiber. A goalkeeper, he began his career at local side Abercynon before signing for Cardiff City at the end of World War II. At the start of the 1946–47 season, he began the season as backup goalkeeper before replacing George Poland after just two matches. He went on to keep 22 clean sheets in 38 league appearances during the remainder of the season, helping the club become Division Three South champions. He kept two further clean sheets in cup competitions to total 24 during the season which remains a club record. He continued as first choice goalkeeper the following season in Division Two but was allowed to leave the club in January 1949 to sign for their local rivals Swansea Town for £3,000.

He spent two years at Swansea, competing with Jack Parry to be first choice goalkeeper, winning the Division Three South title for the second time in his career during the 1948–49 season. In July 1951, Canning was sold to Nottingham Forest for £2,000 but struggled to break into the first team, making just five league appearances, and left the club soon after, moving into non-league football.

== Later life ==
Following his retirement from football, Canning began working as an apprentice toolmaker and went on to become an electronics engineer, designing military equipment. He also took up a number of other sports, including golf, snooker and darts.

== Honours ==
Cardiff City

- Football League Division Three South champions: 1946–47

Swansea Town

- Football League Division Three South champions: 1948–49
