= Ted Owens (footballer) =

English footballer

Personal information
- Full name: Edward Owens
- Date of birth: 7 November 1913
- Place of birth: Trimdon Grange, England
- Date of death: 1980 (aged 66–67)
- Height: 5 ft 8 in (1.73 m)
- Position: Defender

Senior career*
Years	Team	Apps	(Gls)
- Trimdon St Mary's
1930–1934	Stockport County	0	(0)
1930–1934	Preston North End	19	(7)
1934–1945	Crystal Palace	164	(0)
1945–50	Bath City	167	(4)
- * Club domestic league appearances and goals

Edward Owens (7 November 1913 – 1980), often known as Tussy Owens, was a footballer who played in the Football League for Preston North End and Crystal Palace as a defender. He also played in non-league football for Bath City.

== Playing career ==
Born in Trimdon Grange, Owens began his career at Trimdon St Mary's. In 1928, he went on trial at Northampton Town, and in 1929 joined Stockport County, but did not make a League appearance.

In 1930, he joined Preston North End, where he scored seven goals in 19 appearances, and in January 1934 signed for Crystal Palace of the Third Division South. Between then and when regular league competition was suspended due to World War II, he made 164 league appearances for Palace without scoring. In all senior competitions, he made 172 appearances for the club, scoring once.

In the 1939–40 season of wartime regional football, Owens continued to appear for Palace, making a total of 42 appearances in all competitions scoring once. He returned to Stockport County and made 11 appearances in the Football League North in 1944–45. In November 1945, he moved on to Bath City.
