= George Poland =

Welsh footballer

Personal information
- Date of birth: 21 September 1913
- Place of birth: Penarth, Wales
- Date of death: 6 October 1988 (aged 75)
- Place of death: Penarth, Wales
- Height: 5 ft 10 in (1.78 m)
- Position: Goalkeeper

Senior career*
| Years | Team | Apps | (Gls) |
| 1934–1935 | Swindon Town | 0 | (0) |
| 1935–1938 | Cardiff City | 24 | (0) |
| 1938–1939 | Wrexham | 39 | (0) |
| 1939 | Liverpool | 0 | (0) |
| 1946–1947 | Cardiff City | 2 | (0) |
| 1947–1948 | Lovell's Athletic | | |

International career
| 1939 | Wales | 2 | (0) |
- * Club domestic league appearances and goals

George Poland (21 September 1913 – 6 October 1988) was a Welsh professional footballer who played as a goalkeeper. During his career, he made over 50 appearances in the Football League during spells with Cardiff City and Wrexham and won two caps for Wales in 1939. His career was interrupted by the outbreak of World War II which began just after he was signed by First Division side Liverpool meaning he never played for the side. During wartime, he also gained four international caps for Wales.

== Career ==
Born in Penarth, Cardiff, Poland began his career playing as a forward with local amateur sides Cogan and Penarth Mission where his performances attracted the attention of Third Division South side Swindon Town who offered him a trial. Converted to playing as a winger by manager Ted Vizard, he impressed enough to sign for the club but failed to break into the first-team and left the club at the end of the 1934–35 season without making an appearance. He instead began playing as a goalkeeper and joined his hometown club Cardiff City, who had previously rejected him as an outfield player prior to his move to Swindon.

Despite having conceded seven goals in a reserve fixture several days before, he was handed his professional debut on 11 January 1936 in a 2–1 defeat to Torquay United after replacing Jack Deighton in the starting line-up, becoming the third goalkeeper used by the club as they struggled at the bottom of the Third Division South.

Following his debut, he played in six consecutive matches but did not return to the first-team until midway through the following season when he replaced Bill Fielding as first choice goalkeeper. In 1938, he joined Third Division North side Wrexham where he spent one season, breaking into the first-team following an injury to Pat McMahon, and impressed enough to earn a call-up to the Wales national football team, playing 2 matches. He played his first match on 15 March 1939 in a 3–1 victory over Ireland and his last match on 21 May 1939 in a 2–1 defeat to France. His form attracted the attention of Liverpool and he joined the club on 28 June 1939 for a fee of around £4,000. However, the Football League was suspended following the outbreak of World War II and he never played for the side.

During the war years, he served in the Welsh Guards and appeared as a guest player in wartime fixtures for Brentford, Cardiff, Crystal Palace, Fulham and Leeds United and also earned four wartime international caps for Wales.

When the Football League resumed at the end of the war, Poland rejoined Cardiff City and played in the opening two matches of the 1946–47 season, defeats to Norwich City and Swindon Town, but lost his place in the side to Danny Canning. He later played for non-league side Lovell's Athletic.
