= Jock Leckie =

Scottish footballer

Personal information
- Full name: John Thompson Leckie
- Date of birth: 3 March 1906
- Place of birth: Alva, Clackmannanshire, Scotland
- Date of death: 1977 (aged 70–71)
- Place of death: Liverpool, England
- Height: 5 ft 9 in (1.75 m)
- Position: Goalkeeper

Youth career
- Alva Albion

Senior career*
Years	Team	Apps	(Gls)
- Alloa Athletic
- St Johnstone
- Raith Rovers
- Bray Unknowns
1932–1933	Port Vale	24	(0)
1933–1934	Stockport County	5	(0)
1934–1935	Cardiff City	46	(0)
	Walsall	26	(0)
	Carlisle United	8	(0)
Total		109	(0)
- * Club domestic league appearances and goals

John Thompson Leckie (3 March 1906 — 1977) was a Scottish footballer who played as a goalkeeper.

== Career ==
Leckie played for Alva Albion, Alloa Athletic, St Johnstone, Raith Rovers and Bray Unknowns before moving down to England to sign with Port Vale in March 1932. He picked up an injury in only his second game in 1931–32 and was sidelined until the start of his second season at the Old Recreation Ground. During that season he had a period from November 1932 to February 1933 as second-choice keeper behind previous favourite Ben Davies, though in March he was injured once more, and Leckie played 22 games. He left on a free transfer by May 1933. He moved on to Stockport County in 1933–34, dropping down to the Third Division North from the Second Division. He was then Cardiff City's first-team goalkeeper in 1934–35, as the Welsh club struggled near the bottom of the Third Division South. He later turned out for Walsall and Carlisle United.

== Career statistics ==
Appearances and goals by club, season and competition
Club	Season	League			FA Cup		Other		Total	
Club	Season	Division	Apps	Goals	Apps	Goals	Apps	Goals	Apps	Goals
Port Vale	1931–32	Second Division	2	0	0	0	0	0	2	0
Port Vale	1932–33	Second Division	22	0	0	0	0	0	22	0
Port Vale	Total		24	0	0	0	0	0	24	0
Stockport County	1933–34	Third Division North	5	0	0	0	0	0	5	0
Cardiff City	1934–35	Third Division South	28	0	1	0	1	0	30	0
Cardiff City	1935–36	Third Division South	18	0	0	0	1	0	19	0
Cardiff City	Total		46	0	1	0	2	0	49	0
Walsall	1936–37	Third Division South	26	0	5	0	1	0	32	0
Carlisle United	1937–38	Third Division North	8	0	0	0	0	0	8	0
