= Rebecca S. Pringle =

American teacher and union leader (born 1955)

Becky Pringle
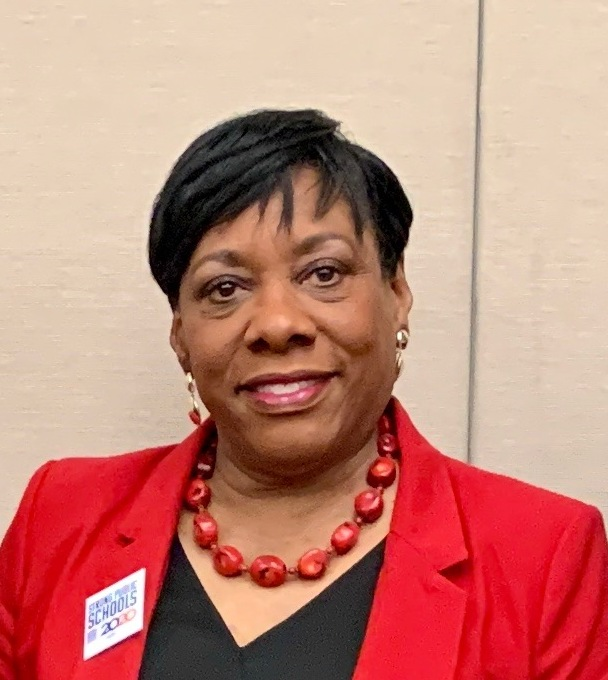
- Pringle in 2019

President of the National Education Association
- In office September 1, 2020 – September 1, 2026
- Preceded by: Lily Eskelsen García
- Succeeded by: Princess R. Moss

Personal details
- Born: 1955 (age 70–71)
- Party: Democratic
- Education: University of Pittsburgh (BS); Pennsylvania State University, University Park (MS)

Rebecca S. "Becky" Pringle (born 1955) is an American teacher and labor union leader. She is the president of the 2.8 million-member National Education Association, the largest professional employee organization and labor union in the United States.

== Early life and education ==
Pringle is a native of Philadelphia, Pennsylvania, and she graduated from the Philadelphia High School for Girls. She received a B.S. from the University of Pittsburgh and a master's degree in education from Pennsylvania State University. She taught in Philadelphia's West Oak Lane section before moving to Harrisburg with her husband, where she worked for 28 years as a middle school physical science teacher in the Susquehanna Township School District.

== Labor leader ==
Before becoming NEA President, Pringle served on the board of directors for the Pennsylvania State Education Association, the NEA Board of Directors, NEA's executive committee, as NEA secretary treasurer, and as NEA vice-president.

She has been vocal in the effort to limit federal testing requirements. She chaired the workgroup that developed the NEA's Policy Statement on Teacher Evaluation and Accountability. President Barack Obama named Pringle a Member of the President's Advisory Commission on Educational Excellence for African Americans. She was elected NEA vice president on July 4, 2014, with 92% of the vote, becoming part of NEA's historic all-minority, all-female leadership team, with Lily Eskelsen García (President), and Princess Moss (Secretary-Treasurer). In July 2020, the NEA Representative Assembly elected Pringle President of the NEA. She took office on September 1, 2020.
