= Jack Deighton =

English footballer

Personal information
- Full name: James Deighton
- Place of birth: West Hartlepool, England
- Height: 5 ft 9 1/2 in (1.77 m)
- Position: Goalkeeper

Senior career*
Years	Team	Apps	(Gls)
1934–1935	Everton		
1935–1936	Cardiff City	18	(0)
- * Club domestic league appearances and goals

James Deighton was an English professional footballer who played as a goalkeeper.

== Career ==
Deighton began his professional career with Everton but was unable to displace Ted Sagar from the first team. He moved to Cardiff City in 1935 and competed with Jock Leckie and George Poland during the 1935–36 season, making 18 league appearances. However, he was released by the club at the end of the season and moved into non-league football.
