= Ralph Allen (footballer) =

English footballer (1906–1981)

Personal information
- Full name: Ralph Slack Littlewood Allen
- Date of birth: 30 June 1906
- Place of birth: Newburn, England
- Date of death: 9 May 1981 (aged 74)
- Height: 5 ft 11 in (1.80 m)
- Position: Forward

Senior career*
Years	Team	Apps	(Gls)
- Walbottle
- Elswick
- Wombwell
- Dipton United
1928–1930	Fulham	16	(8)
1930–1933	Brentford	13	(4)
1934–1936	Charlton Athletic	52	(47)
1936	Reading	10	(7)
1936–1937	Northampton Town	52	(41)
1938–1939	Torquay United	28	(15)
- Annfield Plain
- * Club domestic league appearances and goals

Ralph Slack Littlewood Allen (30 June 1906 – 9 May 1981) was an English professional footballer. He played as a forward and he was born in Newburn, Newcastle-upon-Tyne, Northumberland.

== Career ==
Ralph Allen was playing for Dipton United when signed by Fulham in 1928. After 8 goals in 16 games for the Cottagers, he moved to Brentford in March 1931 for a fee of £275. He failed to make much of an impression on the first team during three seasons with the Bees, but did score heavily in the reserve team's London Combination title wins in 1931–32 and 1932–33, also captaining the team. He left the club to move to Charlton Athletic in October 1934 for £650. At Charlton he averaged almost a goal a game, scoring 47 goals in only 52 league appearances. He still holds the Charlton record for league goals in one season, a feat made more impressive by the fact that he didn't join them until October.

In June 1936, Allen moved on again, this time to Reading for a fee of £820, but moved to Northampton Town in October 1936 after only 10 league games in which he scored seven times. He stayed for just over two years at Northampton, scoring 41 goals in 52 games, before moving to Torquay United in November 1938 in exchange (and as a direct replacement for) Jack Haycox. He scored on his United debut, netting the only goal in a 1–0 win away to Bristol Rovers on 12 November, and remained a regular for the rest of the season. As throughout his career, Allen was scoring regularly (top-scoring with 15 goals in 28 league games) when the Second World War began and drew an early close to a career that started late and saw Allen score a total of 122 goals in 171 league appearances.

== Personal life ==
Allen's brother Jack was also a footballer.
