= Len Attley =

Welsh footballer

Personal information
- Full name: Leonard James Attley
- Date of birth: 21 April 1910
- Place of birth: Cardiff, Wales
- Date of death: 1979 (aged 68–69)
- Place of death: Wales
- Position: Forward

Senior career*
Years	Team	Apps	(Gls)
1934–1936	Cardiff City	12	(2)
1936–?	Yeovil Town		
- * Club domestic league appearances and goals

Leonard James Attley (21 April 1910 – 1979) was a Welsh professional footballer. He made 12 appearances in the Football League for Cardiff City.

== Career ==
Born in Cardiff, Attley joined his hometown club Cardiff City and made his professional debut on 30 March 1934, scoring in a 3–1 victory over Millwall. He appeared in five of the last eight matches in the 1934–35 season but was forced out of the team by Harold Riley during the following year. He was released in 1936 after Cardiff finished bottom of the Third Division South, later joining Yeovil Town.

His nephew, Brian was also a professional footballer.

== Career statistics ==
Club	Season	League			FA Cup		Other		Total	
Club	Season	Division	Apps	Goals	Apps	Goals	Apps	Goals	Apps	Goals
Cardiff City	1934–35	Third Division South	6	2	0	0	0	0	6	2
Cardiff City	1935–36	Third Division South	6	0	0	0	0	0	6	0
Total			12	2	0	0	0	0	12	2
