= Harry Roper =

English footballer

Personal information
- Full name: Harry Roper
- Date of birth: 13 April 1910
- Place of birth: Romiley, England
- Date of death: 16 April 1983 (aged 73)
- Height: 5 ft 10 in (1.78 m)
- Position: Inside forward

Senior career*
Years	Team	Apps	(Gls)
1929–1935	Leeds United	18	(3)
1935–1937	Cardiff City	31	(2)
1937–1938	Stockport County	0	(0)
- * Club domestic league appearances and goals

Harry Roper (13 April 1910 – 16 April 1983) was an English professional footballer. During his career, he made 49 appearances in the Football League in spells with Leeds United and Cardiff City.

== Career ==
Roper had been working in a warehouse as a clark while playing amateur football for New Mills when he was signed by Leeds United in August 1929. He was forced to wait three years before making his professional debut on 29 August 1932 against Blackpool. Despite scoring, Roper did not feature for the club again during the 1932–33 season. The following season, he enjoyed an extended run in the first team before losing his place to Joe Firth.

Unable to regain his place and struggling with a cartilage injury, he left Leeds in May 1935 to join Third Division South side Cardiff City. He made his debut on the opening day of the 1935–36 season in a 3–2 defeat to Crystal Palace, scoring his first goal in his third appearance during a 3–2 defeat to Reading. Having played as an inside forward during the first half of the season, he switched to half back for the remainder and shared playing duties with Harold Smith. He finished the season with 29 appearances in all competitions but was rarely used the following year, making only four appearances in 1936–37, before joining Stockport County in October 1937. However, he was plagued by knee injuries and never appeared for the club's first team.
