= Jack Diamond (footballer, born 1910) =

English footballer

Personal information
- Full name: John James Diamond
- Date of birth: 30 October 1910
- Place of birth: Middlesbrough, England
- Date of death: 8 July 1961 (aged 50)
- Height: 5 ft 9 1/2 in (1.77 m)
- Position: Forward

Senior career*
Years	Team	Apps	(Gls)
1931–1932	Hull City		
1932–1933	Shelbourne		
1933–1934	Southport	48	(28)
1934–1935	Barnsley		
1935–1936	Cardiff City	18	(9)
1936	Bury		
1936–1938	Oldham Athletic		
1938–1939	Hartlepools United		
- * Club domestic league appearances and goals

John James Diamond (30 October 1910 — 8 July 1961) was an English professional footballer who played as a forward.
