= Hugh Hearty =

Scottish footballer

Personal information
- Full name: Hugh Hearty
- Date of birth: 16 June 1912
- Place of birth: Edinburgh, Scotland
- Position: Full back

Senior career*
| Years | Team | Apps | (Gls) |
| 1933–1935 | Heart of Midlothian | 21 | (0) |
| 1935–1936 | Cardiff City | 18 | (0) |
| 1936–1939 | Clapton Orient | | |
- * Club domestic league appearances and goals

Hugh Hearty (16 June 1912 — after 1939) was a Scottish professional footballer who played as a defender.

== Career ==
Born in Edinburgh, Hearty began his career with Heart of Midlothian. He was released by the club in 1935, moving to Cardiff City. He made 18 league appearances during the 1935–36 season but left to join Clapton Orient where he finished his professional career.
