= Utah Education Association =

American teachers' union

Utah Education Association (UEA)
- Utah Education Association
- Founded: 1860
- Headquarters: Murray, Utah
- Location: Utah
- Members: 18,000+ (2026)
- Key people: Renée Pinkney, president
- Affiliations: National Education Association (NEA)

The Utah Education Association (UEA) is the largest public education employees' union in the U.S. state of Utah, representing more than 18,000 public educators. It has local affiliates in 41 school districts, Applied Technology Colleges, and the Utah Schools for the Deaf and the Blind in Ogden. It is the state affiliate of the National Education Association.

== History ==
UEA was organized in 1860 as “The Deseret School Teachers’ Association,” “for the purpose of establishing a society for promoting the educational interests of the community.” In 1910 it was incorporated as the "Utah Educational Association," and by 1924 had adopted the current name.

In May 1963, at the climax of a battle with Utah governor George Dewey Clyde, the UEA led a two-day walkout - the first statewide teacher's strike in the nation. From 1990 to 1996, the president of the UEA was Lily Eskelsen. She also served as president of the NEA. In 2007, UEA, working within a coalition called Utahns for Public Schools, led a successful bid to repeal what would have been the nation's first statewide universal private-school voucher.

== Convention ==
For over 100 years the UEA's annual convention was its largest and most high-profile event, featuring national speakers and workshops on best teaching practices. It also attracted political candidates, and included an awards banquet highlighting excellence in teaching. Most of Utah's school districts take their fall break on or just before the annual deer hunt, and UEA usually scheduled its convention to coincide with this break, so that teachers could attend without taking days off or hiring substitutes. Eventually the schools came to refer to the fall break as "UEA Weekend," until a state law passed in 2007 barred them from doing so, to avoid favoring or endorsing one employee association over another.

In 2018 the UEA ended its annual convention after dwindling attendance, and to give teachers a break from the demands of the classroom.
