= Harry Riley =

English cricketer

Harry Riley (17 August 1875 – 6 November 1922) was an English first-class cricketer, who played four matches for Yorkshire County Cricket Club between 1895 and 1900.

Born in Thackley, Bradford, Yorkshire, England, Riley was a left arm medium bowler, who took one wicket against Worcestershire, at a total cost of 54 runs. He scored 36 runs with a highest score of 25 not out, also against Worcestershire. He took one catch in the field.

Riley also appeared for the Yorkshire Second XI (1900), Yorkshire Colts (1900), Bradford League (1911) and Cheshire (1919).

Riley died in Bradford in November 1922, at the age of 47.
