= Stan Griffiths =

Welsh footballer (1911–2003)

Personal information
- Full name: Stanley Griffiths
- Date of birth: 8 February 1911
- Place of birth: Pentre, Wales
- Date of death: 12 January 2003 (aged 91)
- Place of death: France
- Position: Outside forward

Senior career*
Years	Team	Apps	(Gls)
1931–1932	Cardiff City	0	(0)
1932–1933	Chester	0	(0)
1933–1934	Gillingham	4	(0)
1934–1935	Cardiff City	2	(2)
- Bangor City
- Folkestone
1937–1938	Dundalk	22	(5)
1938–1939	Grantham		
- * Club domestic league appearances and goals

Stanley Griffiths (8 February 1911 – 12 January 2003) was a Welsh professional footballer who played as an outside forward. He played six times in the Football League during spells with Gillingham and Cardiff City.

== Career ==
Born in Pentre, Griffiths began his career with Cardiff City in 1931. Unable to break into the first team, he moved to Chester the following year but again made no appearances. He signed for Gillingham in 1933 and made his professional debut in a 2–1 defeat against Torquay United. He made three further league appearances for the side before returning to Cardiff in 1934. During the 1934–35 season, he made two appearances for Cardiff, scoring in both, but was not retained by the club at the end of the season.

After spells with Bangor and Folkestone, Griffiths joined Irish side Dundalk. He made his debut for the club in their opening match of the season, scoring once in a 3–2 victory over Shelbourne in the Dublin City Cup. He helped the club to win the trophy later in the season, the first time Dundalk had won the competition. Along with fellow winger Jimmy McArdle, he provided numerous assists for forward Joey Donnelly who scored a career high 24 goals during the season and scored ten goals in all competitions himself.

The club also finished the season as runners-up behind Shamrock Rovers in the league and reached the final of the FAI Cup, losing 2–1 to St James's Gate. He returned to England in 1938, joining Grantham where he finished his playing career following the outbreak of World War II.

== Later life ==
Griffiths was called up for service during World War II but was later given a medical discharge owing to cartilage injuries suffered during his playing career. He instead went to work in Chatham Dockyard where he worked until retirement. He also briefly worked as a trainer at his former club Gillingham and as a scout for Sheffield Wednesday. He died in 2003 from neurocysticercosis at his son's home in France. Immediately prior to his death he was believed to be the oldest living former Gillingham player.

== Honours ==
Dundalk

- Dublin City Cup winner: 1938
- FAI Cup finalist: 1938
