= Joe Roberts (footballer) =

English footballer

Personal information
- Full name: Joseph Roberts
- Date of birth: 2 September 1900
- Place of birth: Birkenhead, Cheshire, England
- Date of death: 3 March 1984 (aged 83)
- Place of death: Watford, Hertfordshire, England
- Height: 5 ft 6 in (1.68 m)
- Position: Outside forward

Senior career*
Years	Team	Apps	(Gls)
–1926	Oswestry Town		
1926–1927	Watford	20	(5)
1927–1928	Queens Park Rangers	4	(0)
1928–1929	York City	40	(6)
1929–1930	Halifax Town	22	(1)
1930–1931	Southport	44	(0)
1931–1932	Clapton Orient	2	(0)
1932	Luton Town	17	(2)
1932–1933	Millwall	0	(0)
1933–1934	Barrow	41	(14)
1934–1935	Luton Town	0	(0)
1935–1936	Cardiff City	22	(5)
1936	Dartford		
1936–????	Worcester City		
Total		212	(33)
- * Club domestic league appearances and goals

Joseph Roberts (2 September 1900 – 9 March 1984) was an English professional footballer who played as an outside forward in the Football League for Watford, Queens Park Rangers, Halifax Town, Southport, Clapton Orient, Luton Town, Barrow and Cardiff City, in non-League football for Oswestry Town, York City, Dartford and Worcester City and was on the books of Millwall without making a league appearance.
