= Utah Retirement Systems =

Agency overview
- Formed: 1963
- Headquarters: 560 East 200 South, Salt Lake City, Utah
- Agency executive: Dan Andersen, Executive Director
- Website: http://www.urs.org

Utah Retirement Systems administers pension plans and retirement savings plans for public employees in the U.S. state of Utah. There are eight separate defined-benefit pension plans administered by URS, as well as various retirement savings plans. As of December 31, 2014, the URS was managing over $31 billion in its pension trust funds, for nearly 200,000 members. Besides the pension trust funds, the URS manages a 401(k), 457(b), a traditional IRA and Roth IRA with around $4.5 billion in assets combined at the end of 2014.

== Membership ==
Members of the eight URS pension systems are the employees of over 700 different employers. The two largest systems are the Public Employees Noncontributory Retirement Systems, Tier I and Tier II, with 463 participating employers including all of Utah's school districts, the State of Utah, and its counties and various political subdivisions. The old Contributory system has 159 employers, the Public Safety system has 131, and the Firefighters' system has 59 employers. (Tier 2 Public Safety and Firefighters has 149.) There is a separate retirement system for Judges, and one for Governors and Legislators. 161 employers participate in the URS 457 Savings Plans, and 380 in the 401(k) Plans.

== Governance ==
URS is run by a seven-member board whose members are appointed by the governor. Four of the members represent the investment community, one represents the teachers, and one represents state employees. The state treasurer is an ex-officio member of the retirement board. The board appoints the executive director. In addition to the Retirement Board, there is an advisory Membership Council made up of representatives from the member employee groups.

== History ==
Many public employees in Utah had some kind of pension before the creation of the URS in 1963. As early as 1919, there was a statewide retirement system for firefighters. Many cities had a retirement system for their police in the 1920s. In 1927, prison guards got a retirement system. All of these would eventually be absorbed into URS-administered systems. In 1934, the Utah Education Association drew up a plan for a retirement system for teachers. This became the basis for the Teachers' Retirement System, which went into effect in 1937, covering both teachers and administrators. The "State Officers' and Employees' Retirement System of Utah," later named the Public Employees' Retirement System, was created in 1947. Also, optional state coverage was established for judges and local government employees.

In 1963, joint administration was established for public employees and teachers systems. The School Employees System, Public Employees System, Judges System, Public Safety System (including Highway Patrol), Prison Guards System, former Employee Retirement System, and Firefighters System were placed under a single board. The Public employees and Teachers Employees systems were consolidated into the State Retirement System. This was the creation of the URS. Later, in the 1970s, Utah Firefighters System and Judges System were added. Also, the Utah Legislature established a subcommittee on Retirement.

In the 1980s, custody of the Retirement funds was transferred to the Retirement Board from the State Treasurer, and the Retirement System became an independent agency. The Retirement Board was restructured, altering the board membership and establishing a membership council. A system for judges was added in the 1990s.

In 2010, the Utah legislature created a "Tier II" retirement plan for new employees, with a smaller benefit than the old plan. The motivation was to avoid the pension crises that have affected or threatened to affect many other jurisdictions.

People hired after July 1, 2011, choose either a traditional pension plan or a 401(k)-type plan, with the state contributing 10 percent of an employee's salary (12 percent for uniformed workers) to whichever plan a worker chooses. Employer contributions to the pension plan for new employees are capped at 10% of the employees salary. The 'Tier II' plans require 5 more years of employment for eligibility. The legislature also limited post-retirement re-employment.
