= Albert Banfield =

English footballer

Personal information
- Full name: Albert John Banfield
- Date of birth: 5 May 1912
- Place of birth: Bristol, England
- Date of death: q3 1970 (aged 58)
- Place of death: Bristol, England
- Height: 5 ft 10 in (1.78 m)
- Position: Inside forward

Senior career*
Years	Team	Apps	(Gls)
1932–1935	Bristol City	38	(8)
1935–1936	York City	30	(10)
1936–	Clapton Orient	0	(0)
Total		68	(18)
- * Club domestic league appearances and goals

Albert John Banfield (5 May 1912 – q3 1970) was an English professional footballer who played as an inside forward in the Football League for Bristol City and York City and was on the books of Clapton Orient without making a league appearance.
