= Wally Jennings =

English footballer (1909–1993)

Personal information
- Full name: Walter Henry Jennings
- Date of birth: 1 April 1909
- Place of birth: Bristol, England
- Date of death: 4 November 1993 (aged 84)
- Place of death: Bristol, England
- Position: Right half

Youth career
- 19??–1928: South Bristol Central OB

Senior career*
Years	Team	Apps	(Gls)
1928–1933	Bristol City	122	(1)
1933–1935	Cardiff City	30	(0)
- Bath City
- Cheltenham Town
- * Club domestic league appearances and goals

Walter Henry Jennings (1 April 1909 – 4 November 1993) was an English footballer who played as a right half. He made over 150 Football League appearances in the years before the Second World War.

== Career ==
Wally Jennings played locally for South Bristol Central Old Boys and had trials with Bristol Rovers & Blackburn Rovers. Alex Raisbeck signed Jennings in May 1928 for Bristol City. Jennings moved to Cardiff City in June 1933. Jennings later played for Bath City, Cheltenham Town and Bristol St George. After retiring from playing Wally Jennings was a scout for Everton, Bristol Rovers and Bath City.
