= Edward Lane (footballer) =

English footballer

Personal information
- Full name: Edward Lane
- Date of birth: 1908
- Place of birth: Birmingham, England
- Position: Full-back

Senior career*
Years	Team	Apps	(Gls)
1932–1933	West Bromwich Albion		
1933–1934	Notts County		
1934–1935	Cardiff City	30	(0)
- * Club domestic league appearances and goals

Edward Lane (1908 – after 1935) was an English professional footballer who played as a defender. After short spells with West Bromwich Albion and Notts County, he joined Cardiff City where he made 34 appearances during the 1934–35 season before being released.
