= Harold Riley (footballer) =

English footballer (1909–1982)

Personal information
- Full name: Harold Riley
- Date of birth: 22 November 1909
- Place of birth: Hollinwood, Oldham, England
- Date of death: 8 April 1982 (aged 72)
- Place of death: Lincoln, England
- Height: 5 ft 4 in (1.63 m)
- Position: Inside forward

Senior career*
Years	Team	Apps	(Gls)
1927–1928	Altrincham		
1928–1929	Hurst		
1929	Birmingham	1	(0)
1929–1930	Ashton National	42	(22)
1930–1931	Accrington Stanley	32	(18)
1931–1933	Lincoln City	57	(25)
1933–1934	Notts County	16	(3)
1934–1936	Cardiff City	61	(13)
1936–1938	Northampton Town	22	(4)
1938–1945	Exeter City	28	(11)
1945–1947	Ruston Bucyrus		
- * Club domestic league appearances and goals

Harold Riley (22 November 1909 – 8 April 1982), sometimes known as Harry Riley, was an English professional footballer who scored 74 goals from 217 appearances in the Football League playing for Birmingham, Accrington Stanley, Lincoln City, Notts County, Cardiff City, Northampton Town and Exeter City.

== Career ==
Riley was born in the Hollinwood area of Oldham, Lancashire. He began his football career in the Cheshire County League, first with Altrincham and then with Hurst, for whom he scored both on his debut and on his last appearance, with a total of 11 goals from 22 games in all competitions. After an unsuccessful trial with Manchester United, he played one Football League First Division game for Birmingham, on the last day of the 1928–29 season in a 1–0 win away at Leeds United. Riley returned to the Cheshire League with Ashton National before spending the 1930–31 season with Accrington Stanley of the Third Division North, where he was their joint leading scorer with 18 from 32 games.

Together with Accrington teammate George Whyte, Riley, described as "small and clever", then joined Lincoln City where he played a key role in their 1931–32 Third Division North title. After one season in the Second Division with Lincoln, bringing his contribution up to 27 goals from 59 games in all competitions, he continued his tour with another year in the second tier with Notts County, before finishing off his professional career in the Third Division South. Two years at Cardiff City were followed by another two at Northampton Town and a final spell with Exeter City, where his second season was interrupted by the Second World War. After the war he returned to the Lincoln area where he played for Ruston-Bucyrus' works team, Ruston Bucyrus. In the 1960s he was manager of Lincoln City's reserve team.

Riley also played cricket as a right-handed batsman for Lincolnshire in the 1949 Minor Counties Championship.

Riley died in Lincoln in 1982 at the age of 72.
