= Freddie Hill (footballer, born 1914) =

Welsh footballer

Personal information
- Full name: Fred A. Hill
- Date of birth: 20 June 1914
- Place of birth: Cardiff, Wales
- Position: Forward

Senior career*
Years	Team	Apps	(Gls)
1932–1936	Cardiff City	67	(15)
- * Club domestic league appearances and goals

Fred A. Hill (born 20 June 1914) was a Welsh professional footballer who played his entire professional career at Cardiff City.

Born in Cardiff, Hill joined his hometown club Cardiff City in 1932 after impressing for a local amateur side, making his debut on the opening day of the 1932–33 season in a 4–2 defeat to Reading. He remained with the club for four years, his most prolific season coming in the 1934–35 season when he scored eight goals in all competitions. However, during the following year, he fell out of favour at the club and was released at the end of the season.
