= Reg Weaver =

American labor leader (1939–2026)

Reginald Lee Weaver (August 13, 1939 – March 24, 2026) was an American labor leader who served as president of the National Education Association. He was vice president of Education International.

== Life and career ==
Reginald Lee Weaver was born in Danville, Illinois, on August 13, 1939. A graduate of Danville High School in Illinois, he held degrees from Illinois State University and Roosevelt University. He completed his second term as NEA president on August 31, 2008.

Weaver died on March 24, 2026, at the age of 86.
