= Alfie Clarke (footballer) =

Welsh footballer

Personal information
- Full name: Alfred William Clarke
- Date of birth: 1914
- Place of birth: Newport, Wales
- Date of death: 1953 (aged 38–39)
- Height: 5 ft 6 1/2 in (1.69 m)
- Position: Inside left

Senior career*
Years	Team	Apps	(Gls)
1932	Newport County	0	(0)
- Lovell's Athletic
1934–1936	Newport County	29	(7)
- Lovell's Athletic

International career
- Wales Schoolboys
1935–1938	Wales Amateurs	2	(0)
- * Club domestic league appearances and goals

Alfred William Clarke (1914–1953) was a Welsh amateur footballer who played as an inside left in the Football League for Newport County. He was capped by Wales at amateur level.
