= Football League Third Division South Cup =

- Organiser(s): Football Association
- Founded: 1933; 93 years ago
- Abolished: 1946; 80 years ago
- Region: Southern England; Wales
- Teams: 10
- Last champions: Bournemouth & Boscombe Athletic (1st title)

The Football League Third Division South Cup was a football knockout competition open to teams competing in Football League Third Division South.

The competition was first held in the 1933–34 season and ran until the 1938–39 season. The cup was revived for the 1945–46 season.

== Format ==
The competition was run using a knockout format, with games replayed if level. In the first year the tournament format resulted in 6 first round ties, with the remaining 10 sides joining in the next round to make eight ties. In most seasons there were minor changes to the format, resulting in differing numbers of ties in each round. The tournaments featured all 22 teams from Division Three South. In the first two seasons the final was played at a neutral venue, and for the next three seasons the final was two-legged, whilst the final edition was not completed.

The 1945–46 competition started with two cup competitions, the Third Division South (South) Cup and Third Division South (North) Cup. Each cup consisted of 11 teams played on a league basis, although only 16 games were played by each team. The first two places in each cup then contested the semi-finals of a knockout competition.

== Finals ==
Season	Winners	Result	Runner-up	Venue	Att.	Notes
1933–34	Exeter City	1–0	Torquay United	Home Park	6,198	
1934–35	Bristol Rovers	3–2	Watford	The Den	5,294	
1935–36	Swindon Town	0–2	Coventry City	County Ground	3,610	First Leg
1935–36	Coventry City	3–2	Swindon Town	Highfield Road	2,077	Second Leg
1935–36	Coventry City won 5–2 on aggregate.					
1936–37	Watford	2–2	Millwall	Vicarage Road	2,714	First Leg
1936–37	Millwall	1–1	Watford	The Den	3,368	Second Leg
1936–37	Match drawn 3–3 on aggregate. Trophy shared.					
1937–38	Reading	6–1	Bristol City	Elm Park	1,097	First Leg
1937–38	Bristol City	1–0	Reading	Ashton Gate	718	Second Leg
1937–38	Reading won 6–2 on aggregate.					
1938–39	Semi-final replay between Queens Park Rangers and Port Vale not played. Torquay United were in the final.					
1945–46	Bournemouth & Boscombe Athletic	1–0	Walsall			

=== Venues ===
The 1933–34 final was held at Home Park, Plymouth on 2 May 1934.

The 1945–46 final was held at Stamford Bridge, London.

== See also ==
- Football League Third Division North Cup
- Football League Trophy
