= Football League Third Division South =

- Organising body: The Football League
- Founded: 1921
- Folded: 1958
- Country: England
- Other club from: Wales
- Number of clubs: 22 (1921–1950); 24 (1950–1958)
- Level on pyramid: 3
- Promotion to: Second Division
- Domestic cup: FA Cup
- League cup(s): Third Division South Cup (1933–1939, 1945–1946)
- Last champions: Brighton & Hove Albion (1957–58)
- Most championships: Bristol City (3 titles)

The Third Division South of the Football League was a tier in the English football league system from 1921 to 1958. It ran in parallel with the Third Division North with clubs elected to the League or relegated from Division Two allocated to one or the other according to geographical position. Some clubs in the English Midlands shuttled between the Third Division South and the Third Division North according to the composition of the two leagues in any one season.

This division was created in 1921 from the Third Division, formed one year earlier when the Football League absorbed the leading clubs from the Southern League.

In 1921, a Northern section was also created called the Third Division North. The Third Division South was formed from the original 22 teams in the Third Division, with the exceptions of Crystal Palace, who were promoted to the Second Division, Grimsby Town who were transferred to the Third Division North, and Aberdare Athletic and Charlton Athletic who joined The Football League for the first time. Several Midlands-based teams were included in the Third Division South from time to time, although most were geographically closer to their Northern division rivals; Nottingham Forest and Notts County played in the Southern division although nearby Derby County spent time in the Northern division.

For the 1950–51 season the division was expanded to 24 clubs, with Colchester United and Gillingham joining.

Only one promotion place was available each season from the Third Division South to the Second Division, which made it very difficult to win promotion. Six teams, Brighton & Hove Albion, Exeter City, Northampton Town, Southend United, Swindon Town, and Watford, were ever-present in the division for the 30 years of its existence. Of the teams that played in the Third Division South, Portsmouth, Ipswich Town, and Nottingham Forest were later English football champions.

Its final season was 1957–58, after which the North and South sections were merged to form a single Third Division and a new Fourth Division. The top 12 clubs in Division Three South, except for the Champions Brighton & Hove Albion, went into the new Third Division, and the bottom 12 clubs went into the Fourth Division.

== Tournaments between Third Division South and North ==
From 1934 to the war's outbreak, there was a short-lived knockout competition Football League Third Division South Cup.

From the 1954–55 season until the 1957–58 season, there was a series of games between teams representing the Third Division North and the Third Division South.

== Champions ==
Season	Champions
1921–22	Southampton
1922–23	Bristol City
1923–24	Portsmouth
1924–25	Swansea Town
1925–26	Reading
1926–27	Bristol City
1927–28	Millwall
1928–29	Charlton Athletic
1929–30	Plymouth Argyle
1930–31	Notts County
1931–32	Fulham
1932–33	Brentford
1933–34	Norwich City
1934–35	Charlton Athletic
1935–36	Coventry City
1936–37	Luton Town
1937–38	Millwall
1938–39	Newport County
1939–40	League abandoned due to World War II
1940–46	League suspended due to World War II
1946–47	Cardiff City
1947–48	Queens Park Rangers
1948–49	Swansea Town
1949–50	Notts County
1950–51	Nottingham Forest
1951–52	Plymouth Argyle
1952–53	Bristol Rovers
1953–54	Ipswich Town
1954–55	Bristol City
1955–56	Leyton Orient
1956–57	Ipswich Town
1957–58	Brighton & Hove Albion

Source: Statto
