= 1907–08 New Brompton F.C. season =

English football club season

New Brompton
1907–08 season
- Chairman: James Barnes
- Manager: Steve Smith
- Southern League Division One: 20th
- FA Cup: Second round
- Top goalscorer: League: Charlie McGibbon (14); All: Charlie McGibbon (22)
- Highest home attendance: 12,000 vs Manchester City (5 February 1908)
- Lowest home attendance: 2,000 vs Crystal Palace (15 February 1908) and vs Swindon Town (1 April 1908)
Home colours

During the 1907–08 English football season, New Brompton F.C. (named Gillingham F.C. since 1912) competed in the Southern League Division One. It was the 14th season in which the club competed in the Southern League and the 13th in Division One. The team lost their first game of the season 9–1 to Bristol Rovers, the heaviest defeat in the club's history up to that point. Despite the poor start, the team climbed to 6th place out of 20 teams in the league table in mid-November after a run of three consecutive wins, but by the end of December they had slipped to 12th place, having achieved seven wins and five draws in twenty Southern League games. In the second half of the season, however, the team lost fourteen out of eighteen league games, and New Brompton finished the campaign in 20th place, the first time the team had finished bottom of the table.

New Brompton also competed in the FA Cup; in the first round they played Sunderland, the first time a team from the Football League First Division had played at New Brompton's Priestfield Road ground. New Brompton won 3–1, which was seen as the greatest win the club had yet achieved. In the second round they held another First Division team, Manchester City, to a draw away from home but lost the replay. The team played a total of 42 league and cup matches, winning 11, drawing 8, and losing 23. Charlie McGibbon was the club's top goalscorer with 14 goals in the league and 8 in the FA Cup. John Martin made the most appearances, playing in 40 of the team's 42 competitive games. The FA Cup match against Sunderland set a new attendance record for the Priestfield Road ground of 10,620; the record was broken again for the match against Manchester City, which drew an attendance reported at 12,000.

== Background and pre-season ==
New Brompton, founded in 1893, had played in the Southern League since the competition's formation in 1894. At the time, only a handful of teams from the south of England had been elected into the ostensibly national Football League, with most of the south's leading teams playing in the Southern League. The 1907–08 season was the club's 13th season in Division One, the league's top division, following promotion from Division Two at the first attempt in 1895. In the preceding eight seasons, the team had only finished in the top half of the league table twice. Their lowest point came in the 1905–06 season when New Brompton finished 17th out of 18 teams in the division but were re-elected to Division One after the Southern League opted to increase the number of clubs in the division.

Steve Smith, who had been appointed player-manager midway through the previous season, continued in the role. Three forwards who had joined New Brompton a year earlier, Joe Warrington, Billy Lee, and Dan Cunliffe, all left after a single season; Cunliffe had been the team's top goalscorer in the previous campaign. In their place, the club signed Jack Hopkins, who had last played for Wolverhampton Wanderers, Jack Pickering, who had most recently played for Luton Town, former Tunbridge Wells player Harold Salter, and Charlie McGibbon, who played as an amateur while serving in the army with the Corps of Royal Engineers. McGibbon was chauffeured to each home game from his barracks in London in a car paid for by New Brompton's chairman, James Barnes. G. Wagstaffe Simmons of The Sporting Life wrote that New Brompton "always appear[ed] to be struggling against an adverse fate". He noted that the team's defence had performed well in the previous season and that results should improve with "a more virile forward line". The players wore New Brompton's usual kit of black and white striped shirts, white shorts, and black socks.

== Southern League ==
=== September–December ===
New Brompton were defeated in September at White Hart Lane, home of Tottenham Hotspur.

The team's first game of the season was away to Bristol Rovers on 4 September. McGibbon, Pickering, and Hopkins all made their debuts in the forward line, and two newly-signed half-backs, Harry Robotham and David Fullarton, also made their first appearances. New Brompton were forced to play most of the game with only ten men after Hopkins sustained a knee injury.^{[a]} The match finished 9–1 to the home team, the highest number of goals New Brompton had conceded in a competitive match in the club's history. Three days later Pickering scored twice in a 2–2 draw away to Queens Park Rangers (QPR), and he repeated the feat on 9 September as New Brompton beat Southampton 2–1 in the first game of the season at their own ground, Priestfield Road. The team achieved a second consecutive home win on 14 September, securing a 1–0 victory over Bristol Rovers just ten days after conceding nine goals against the same opponents. A week later, New Brompton lost 2–1 away to Tottenham Hotspur; the reported attendance of 16,000 was the highest for any of New Brompton's league games during the season. Even though his team lost, New Brompton's goalkeeper, John Martin, was praised by a reporter for The Sunday People, who wrote that he "saved in brilliant style several times". In the final match of September, New Brompton took a 2–0 lead over Leyton but conceded two goals and had to settle for a draw.

Against Swindon Town in the first match of October, Fred Mavin, a half-back who had been a regular in the previous two seasons, made his first appearance of the campaign and a forward called Barker made his debut in place of Pickering; the game resulted in a 1–0 win for Swindon. Another defeat against Reading a week later left New Brompton 14th out of 20 teams in the league table. On 19 October, New Brompton took a 1–0 lead away to Crystal Palace but then conceded three goals within four minutes. Bill Marriott, who had scored New Brompton's first goal, then added two more to secure a draw for his team. A reporter for the Athletic News singled out the veteran Smith for praise, saying that he had given spectators "a glimpse of his form of ten years ago" and that "few wing men in the country could have equalled his placing, which led up to all of the visitors' goals". A week after Marriott scored the team's first hat-trick of the season, McGibbon did the same, scoring all his team's goals in a 3–1 victory over Watford. New Brompton's first two games of November both resulted in 2–1 wins, away to Luton Town and at home to Norwich City, after which they were in sixth place in the league table. The three victories were followed, however, by three consecutive defeats. On 16 November, New Brompton lost 3–0 away to Brighton & Hove Albion, and this was followed by a 1–0 defeat at home to Northampton Town. New Brompton ended the month with a 5–2 defeat away to Portsmouth; Harry Metherell played in goal in place of Martin, who was absent from the team for the first time in over a year.

On 14 December, New Brompton played Bradford (Park Avenue), who had been accepted into the Southern League at the start of the season despite being based in Yorkshire, more than 130 miles further north than any other team in the division. In what a writer for The Daily Telegraph called a "remarkable game", seven goals were scored in the first half and Bradford led 5–2 at the interval. In the second half, New Brompton scored three times without reply and the game finished 5–5. A week later, New Brompton lost to Plymouth Argyle, who were in second place in the Division One league table. New Brompton's final three games of 1907 took place within four days. On Christmas Day, they played away to West Ham United. Bill Floyd scored an own goal to give West Ham the lead and New Brompton then missed a penalty kick, but Frank Spriggs and Salter scored to give what a correspondent for The Daily Telegraph described as a "surprising victory". The following day they gained a second consecutive 2–1 victory, defeating Brentford at Priestfield Road. The team's final game of the year resulted in a 0–0 draw with Millwall, after which New Brompton were 12th out of 20 teams in the Division One league table, with seven wins, five draws, and eight defeats in twenty matches.

=== January–April ===
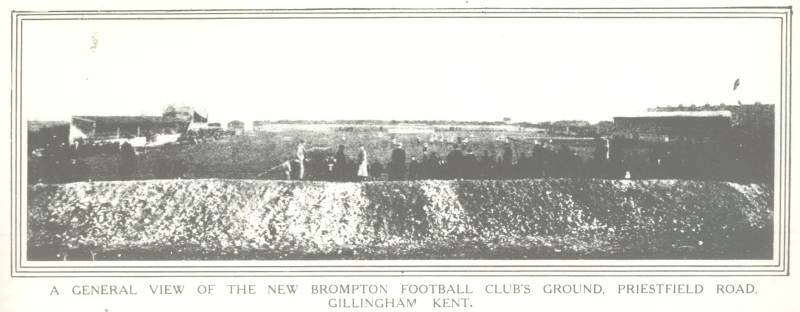
New Brompton began 1908 with a defeat at their home ground, Priestfield Road.

New Brompton's three-game unbeaten run ended in the first game of 1908 at home to QPR, who won 4–0; all the goals were scored in the first half. It was the first in a run of four consecutive league defeats. On 18 January, Smith gave New Brompton a first-half lead against Tottenham Hotspur but Tottenham scored twice to claim victory; due to an injury, Martin was absent from New Brompton's goal for only the second time during the season. The run of league defeats continued a week later as New Brompton lost 1–0 away to Leyton, who were in last place in the league table. In the first league game of February, New Brompton lost 2–0 away to Reading, both goals being scored in the first half. The result left New Brompton 18th in the table. On 15 February, goals from Jimmy Hartley and Spriggs secured a 2–2 draw at home to Crystal Palace, and a week later New Brompton drew 1–1 away to Watford, another team near the foot of the league table. The results took New Brompton back up to 16th place, but they ended February by once again losing to a team below them in the table as Luton Town secured a 1–0 victory at Priestfield Road.

Following a 2–1 defeat to Norwich City on 7 March, New Brompton won their first league game of 1908 at the ninth attempt when they beat Brighton & Hove Albion; after Brighton had taken the lead in the first half, goals from McGibbon and Salter in the second half gave New Brompton a 2–1 victory. After that win, however, the team lost their next five consecutive games. The run began with a 2–0 defeat away to Northampton Town on 21 March. After the game, a spectator threw mud at New Brompton's Ernest Harvey, in response to a clash between him and a Northampton player during the match; Harvey retaliated and had to be removed from the scene by police officers. Robert Walker and Jimmy Pass, two forwards signed from Tottenham, made their debuts in the final game of March but neither scored and New Brompton lost the game against Portsmouth 3–1, a result which left them 19th in the league table. The team's first two games of April resulted in a 1–0 defeat away to Swindon Town and a 2–0 loss at home to Southampton. Smith made what would prove to be his final appearance for New Brompton in the latter game. Marriott scored New Brompton's first goal in three games against Bradford (Park Avenue) on 11 April, but the game ended in a fifth consecutive defeat for his team.

On 17 April, New Brompton won for the first time in over a month, defeating West Ham United. Pass scored his first goal for the team in the first half and Salter and McGibbon added further goals in the second half to secure a 3–0 win. After the victory, the team ended the season with three consecutive defeats in which they scored no goals. One day after beating West Ham, they lost 3–0 at home to Plymouth Argyle, a result which the Western Morning News called an "easy victory" for the visitors. Two days later, they lost 1–0 away to Brentford. The final game of the season took place on 25 April away to Millwall; Cunliffe, who had left New Brompton at the start of the season, scored both goals in a 2–0 victory for the home team. A reporter for The Daily Telegraph praised New Brompton's goalkeeper Martin for keeping the margin of defeat down to two goals. The result meant New Brompton had lost fourteen out of eighteen league games since the start of 1908. They finished in 20th and last place in the league table, the worst finish the club had achieved in thirteen seasons in Division One of the Southern League.

=== League match details ===
Key

- In result column, New Brompton's score shown first
- H = Home match
- A = Away match
- pen. = Penalty kick
- o.g. = Own goal

Results
Date	Opponents	Result	Goalscorers	Attendance
4 September 1907	Bristol Rovers (A)	1–9	McGibbon	4,000
7 September 1907	Queens Park Rangers (A)	2–2	Pickering (2)	7,000
9 September 1907	Southampton (H)	2–1	Pickering (2)	4,000
14 September 1907	Bristol Rovers (H)	1–0	McGibbon	7,000
21 September 1907	Tottenham Hotspur (A)	1–2	Pickering	16,000
28 September 1907	Leyton (H)	2–2	Salter, Harvey (pen.)	6,000
5 October 1907	Swindon Town (A)	0–1		5,000
12 October 1907	Reading (H)	1–2	Salter	5,000
19 October 1907	Crystal Palace (A)	3–3	Marriott (3)	8,000
26 October 1907	Watford (H)	3–1	McGibbon (3)	5,000
2 November 1907	Luton Town (A)	2–1	McGibbon, Pickering	5,000
9 November 1907	Norwich City (H)	2–1	Hartley, McGibbon	7,000
16 November 1907	Brighton & Hove Albion (A)	0–3		5,500
23 November 1907	Northampton Town (H)	0–1		6,000
30 November 1907	Portsmouth (A)	2–5	Hartley (2)	9,000
14 December 1907	Bradford (Park Avenue) (A)	5–5	McGibbon (2), Hopkins, Pickering, Mavin	not recorded
21 December 1907	Plymouth Argyle (A)	0–1		7,500
25 December 1907	West Ham United (A)	2–1	Spriggs, Salter	10,000
26 December 1907	Brentford (H)	2–1	Hopkins, McGibbon	6,000
28 December 1907	Millwall (H)	0–0		4,000
4 January 1908	Queens Park Rangers (H)	0–4		5,000
18 January 1908	Tottenham Hotspur (H)	1–2	Smith	5,000
25 January 1908	Leyton (A)	0–1		2,500
8 February 1908	Reading (A)	0–2		not recorded
15 February 1908	Crystal Palace (H)	2–2	Hartley, Spriggs	2,000
22 February 1908	Watford (A)	1–1	Salter	3,000
29 February 1908	Luton Town (H)	0–1		3,000
7 March 1908	Norwich City (A)	1–2	McGibbon	3,000
14 March 1908	Brighton & Hove Albion (H)	2–1	McGibbon (pen.), Salter	2,500
21 March 1908	Northampton Town (A)	0–2		4,000
28 March 1908	Portsmouth (H)	1–3	McGibbon	4,000
1 April 1908	Swindon Town (H)	0–1		2,000
4 April 1908	Southampton (A)	0–2		3,000
11 April 1908	Bradford (Park Avenue) (H)	2–3	Marriott, Salter	3,000
17 April 1908	West Ham United (H)	3–0	Pass, Salter, McGibbon	5,000
18 April 1908	Plymouth Argyle (H)	0–3		5,000
20 April 1908	Brentford (A)	0–1		5,000
25 April 1908	Millwall (A)	0–2		5,000

=== Partial league table ===
Southern League Division One final table, bottom positions
Pos	Team	Pld	W	D	L	GF	GA	GAv	Pts
15	Norwich City	38	12	9	17	46	49	0.939	33
16	Brentford	38	14	5	19	49	53	0.925	33
17	Brighton & Hove Albion	38	12	8	18	46	59	0.780	32
18	Luton Town	38	12	6	20	33	56	0.589	30
19	Leyton	38	8	11	19	52	74	0.703	27
20	New Brompton	38	9	7	22	44	75	0.587	25

== FA Cup ==
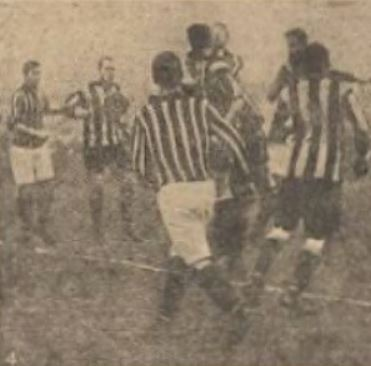
Action from New Brompton's FA Cup match against Sunderland

As a Southern League Division One team, New Brompton entered the 1907–08 FA Cup in the fifth and final qualifying round; their opponents were Shepherd's Bush of the Spartan League. McGibbon scored three times as New Brompton beat their amateur opponents 6–0 at Priestfield Road to reach the first round proper. At this stage of the competition, they were drawn to play Sunderland of the Football League First Division, the top tier of English football. It was the first time New Brompton had played a team from the First Division in a competitive match at Priestfield Road and it drew a record attendance for the ground of 10,620. Previewing the game, an uncredited writer for The Daily Telegraph noted that New Brompton were of "very ordinary ability" and would need to "play far above their normal form to avoid disaster". George Holley gave Sunderland the lead in the first half but McGibbon equalised shortly afterwards. In the second half, McGibbon scored twice more and New Brompton won the match 3–1. The result was considered a significant upset and the greatest victory in New Brompton's history to date, one newspaper reporting that among the home fans "hats and sticks were wildly flung into the air".

In the second round, New Brompton played another First Division team, Manchester City, who had won the competition four years earlier. The match took place at Manchester City's Hyde Road ground and drew a crowd of 16,000. Manchester City's Bob Grieve was injured and forced to leave the game within the first ten minutes, reducing his team to ten men for more than 80 minutes.^{[a]} McGibbon scored to give New Brompton the lead late in the first half. The team defended their lead for much of the second half but Lot Jones scored a late equaliser for Manchester City and the game ended 1–1. The replay at Priestfield Road set another attendance record for the venue, with the crowd reported at 12,000 and the gate receipts at over £450 (equivalent to £60,000 in 2023). New Brompton conceded a goal in the first half but McGibbon equalised shortly after the interval from a penalty kick. They repeatedly attacked the Manchester City goal in the second half but could not score. City scored a second goal late in the game and went on to win 2–1 and eliminate New Brompton from the competition.

=== Cup match details ===
Key

- In result column, New Brompton's score shown first
- H = Home match
- A = Away match
- pen. = Penalty kick
- o.g. = Own goal

Results
Date	Round	Opponents	Result	Goalscorers	Attendance
7 December 1907	Fifth qualifying	Shepherd's Bush (H)	6–0	McGibbon (3), Hopkins, Salter, Marriott	5,000
11 January 1908	First	Sunderland (H)	3–1	McGibbon (3)	10,620
1 February 1908	Second	Manchester City (A)	1–1	McGibbon	16,000
5 February 1908	Second (replay)	Manchester City (H)	1–2	McGibbon (pen.)	12,000

== Players ==
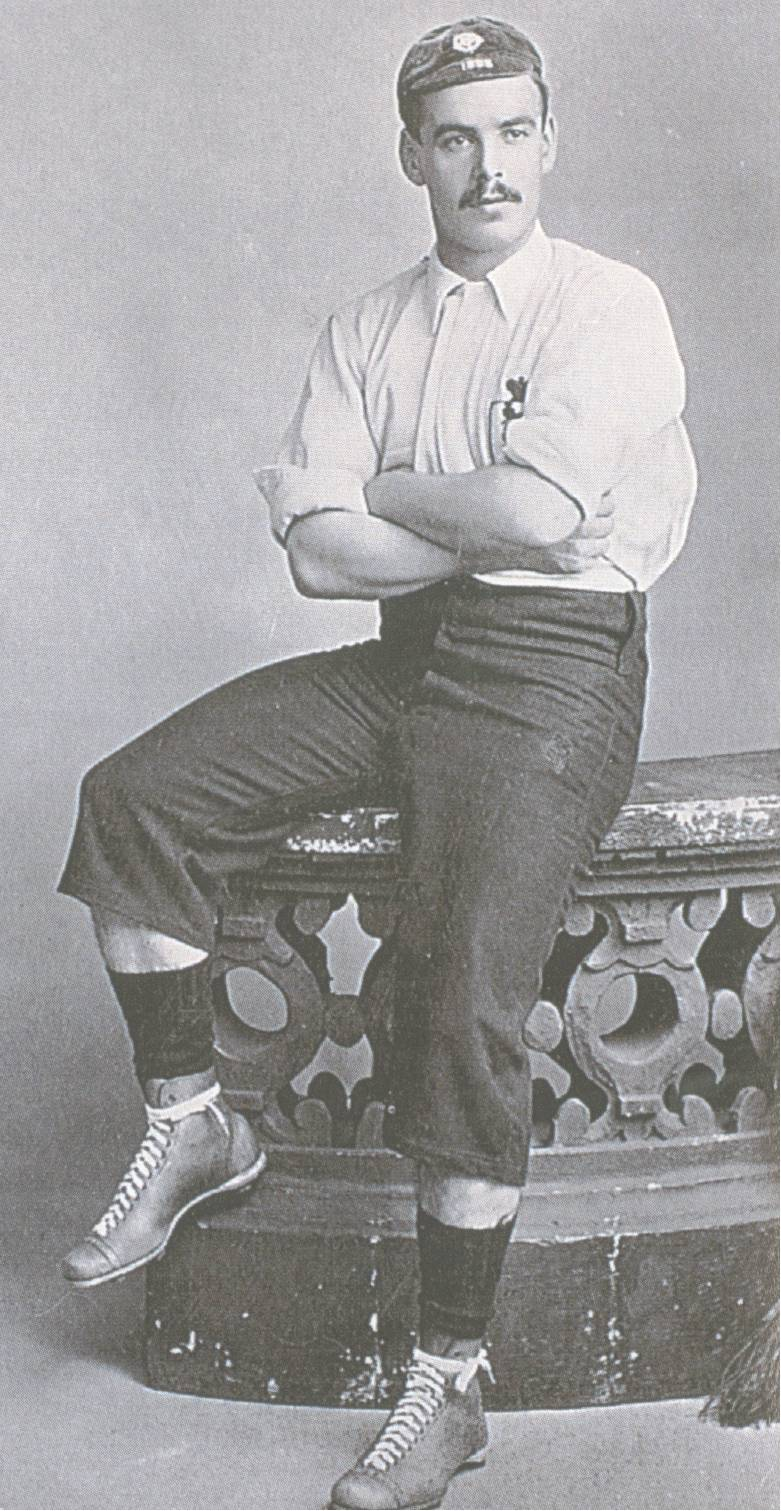
Steve Smith was the team's player-manager and made 37 appearances.

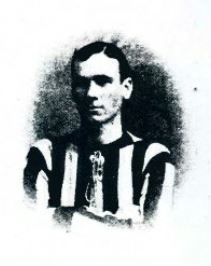
John Martin made 40 appearances in goal for New Brompton. At the time, goalkeepers wore the same colours as their teammates.

During the season, 21 players appeared for New Brompton. Martin made the most appearances, playing in 40 of the team's 42 competitive games. Five other players made more than 35 appearances: Floyd, Fullarton, Smith, George Lloyd, and McGibbon. Four players made fewer than five appearances, of whom two, recorded only as McKinnell and McLachlan, made the fewest, each playing only once. McLachlan's appearance was the only game he played for the New Brompton first team. Eleven players scored for the team. McGibbon was the top scorer, with 22 goals, of which 14 were scored in the league and 8 in the FA Cup. No other player scored more than eight times.

Player statistics
Player	Position	Southern League		FA Cup		Total	
Player	Position	Apps	Goals	Apps	Goals	Apps	Goals
Barker	FW	4	0	0	0	4	0
Bill Floyd	FB	34	0	4	0	38	0
David Fullarton	HB	36	0	1	0	37	0
Jimmy Hartley	FW	14	4	1	0	15	4
Ernest Harvey	FB	29	1	4	0	33	1
Jack Hopkins	FW	11	2	4	1	15	3
George Lloyd	HB	32	0	4	0	36	0
Bill Marriott	FW	21	4	1	1	22	5
John Martin	GK	36	0	4	0	40	0
Fred Mavin	HB	26	1	4	0	30	1
Charlie McGibbon	FW	32	14	4	8	36	22
McKinnell	FB	1	0	0	0	1	0
McLachlan	HB	1	0	0	0	1	0
Harry Metherell	GK	2	0	0	0	2	0
Jimmy Pass	FW	8	1	0	0	8	1
Jack Pickering	FW	22	7	2	0	24	7
Harry Robotham	HB	30	0	3	0	33	0
Harold Salter	FW	30	7	4	1	34	8
Steve Smith	FW	33	1	4	0	37	1
Frank Spriggs	FW	8	2	0	0	8	2
Robert Walker	FW	8	0	0	0	8	0

FW = Forward, HB = Half-back, GK = Goalkeeper, FB = Full-back

== Aftermath ==
Despite finishing 20th in the table, New Brompton were reprieved from relegation to Division Two, which was at the time not automatic. At the league's annual meeting, the chairman of Northampton Town proposed that the bottom two clubs in Division One, Leyton and New Brompton, should be summarily re-elected to the division, but this was rejected. Instead, the two clubs were told that they must "retire" from Division One but would be included on a ballot to fill the two vacant places and three further vacancies created by teams leaving the Southern League altogether. Also on the ballot were two teams from Division Two and two teams applying to join from other leagues. New Brompton gained the third-highest number of votes among the six clubs and thus remained in Division One. At the club's own annual general meeting in June, the chairman reported a deficit on the balance sheet of £1,277 (equivalent to £170,000 in 2023), although this was a significant improvement on the position a year earlier.

Smith left the club, choosing to retire from professional football, and the playing squad was almost completely overhauled, to the extent that Mavin was the only player in the New Brompton team on the opening day of the 1908–09 season who had played for the team during the previous campaign. New Brompton ended the 1908–09 season in seventh place in the Division One league table, the team's best finish for six seasons. The club, which changed its name to Gillingham in 1912, remained in the Southern League Division One until 1920 when all its member clubs were elected into the Football League to form its new Third Division.

== Footnotes ==
a. The concept of substitutes was not introduced to English football until the 1960s. Previously, if a player had to leave a game due to injury, the team had to continue with fewer players.
