= 1906–07 New Brompton F.C. season =

English football club season

New Brompton
1906–07 season
- Chairman: James Barnes
- Manager: Steve Smith (from late November 1906)
- Southern League Division One: 16th
- FA Cup: Second round
- Top goalscorer: League: Dan Cunliffe (15); All: Dan Cunliffe (15)
- Highest home attendance: 7,000 vs Portsmouth (1 April 1907)
- Lowest home attendance: 1,000 vs Leyton (13 February 1907)
Home colours

During the 1906–07 English football season, New Brompton F.C. (named Gillingham F.C. since 1912) competed in the Southern League Division One. It was the 13th season in which the club competed in the Southern League and the 12th in Division One. The team started the season poorly, with only one win in the first four games, but then won three consecutive games to climb to 9th out of 20 teams in the league table. After another poor run between mid-October and the end of November, during which the team lost five out of six games and dropped to 19th, the directors appointed Steve Smith as player-manager. Although the team won their first game following his appointment, their results in the second half of the season remained inconsistent, with another six-game winless run in February and March. In April, however, New Brompton won four out of six games to finish the season 16th in the table.

New Brompton also competed in the FA Cup, reaching the second round. The team played a total of 42 league and cup matches, winning 13, drawing 11 and losing 18. Dan Cunliffe was the club's top goalscorer with 15 goals. Smith and John Martin made the most appearances; both played in all 42 of the team's competitive games. The highest attendance recorded at the club's home ground, Priestfield Road, was 7,000 for a game against Portsmouth on 1 April 1907.

== Background and pre-season ==
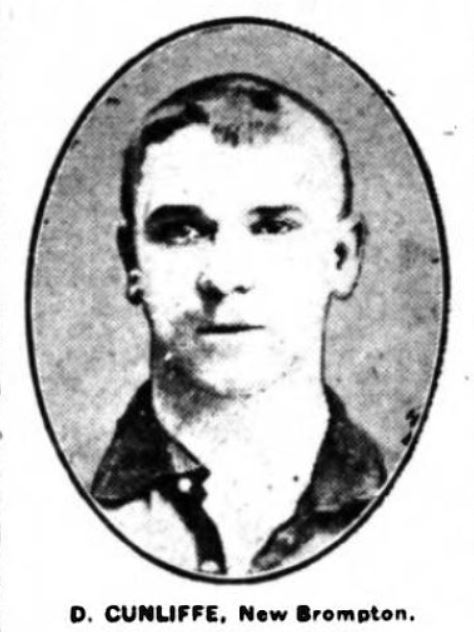
Dan Cunliffe was one of four players to join New Brompton from Portsmouth.

New Brompton, founded in 1893, had played in the Southern League since the competition's formation in 1894. The 1906–07 season was the club's 12th season in Division One, the league's top division, following promotion from Division Two at the first attempt in 1895. In the preceding seven seasons, the team had only finished in the top half of the league table twice, reaching a low point in the 1905–06 season when New Brompton had finished 17th out of 18 teams in the division but were re-elected to Division One after the Southern League opted to increase the number of clubs in the division. At the time, only a handful of teams from the south of England had been elected into the ostensibly national Football League, with most of the south's leading teams playing in the Southern League.

Following a season in which New Brompton had scored only 20 goals in 34 games, by far the lowest in the division, the club signed four players, all forwards, from division rivals Portsmouth: Joe Warrington, Billy Lee, and the former England internationals Dan Cunliffe and Steve Smith. A fifth forward, Jimmy Hartley, arrived from Brentford. Billy Morgan, a half-back who had last played for Leicester Fosse, joined the club, as did former Crystal Palace player George Walker, who was expected to replace Joe Walton, a full-back who had been transferred to Chelsea. The Athletic News reviewed the club's new-look squad and wrote that "with such a list of players, the "Hoppers" should be able to hold their own against most comers". New Brompton did not employ a team manager at the start of the season and all team matters fell within the remit of William Ironside Groombridge, the club's secretary. The team also had a trainer named Craddock. The players wore New Brompton's usual kit of black and white striped shirts, white shorts, and black socks.

== Southern League ==
=== September–December ===
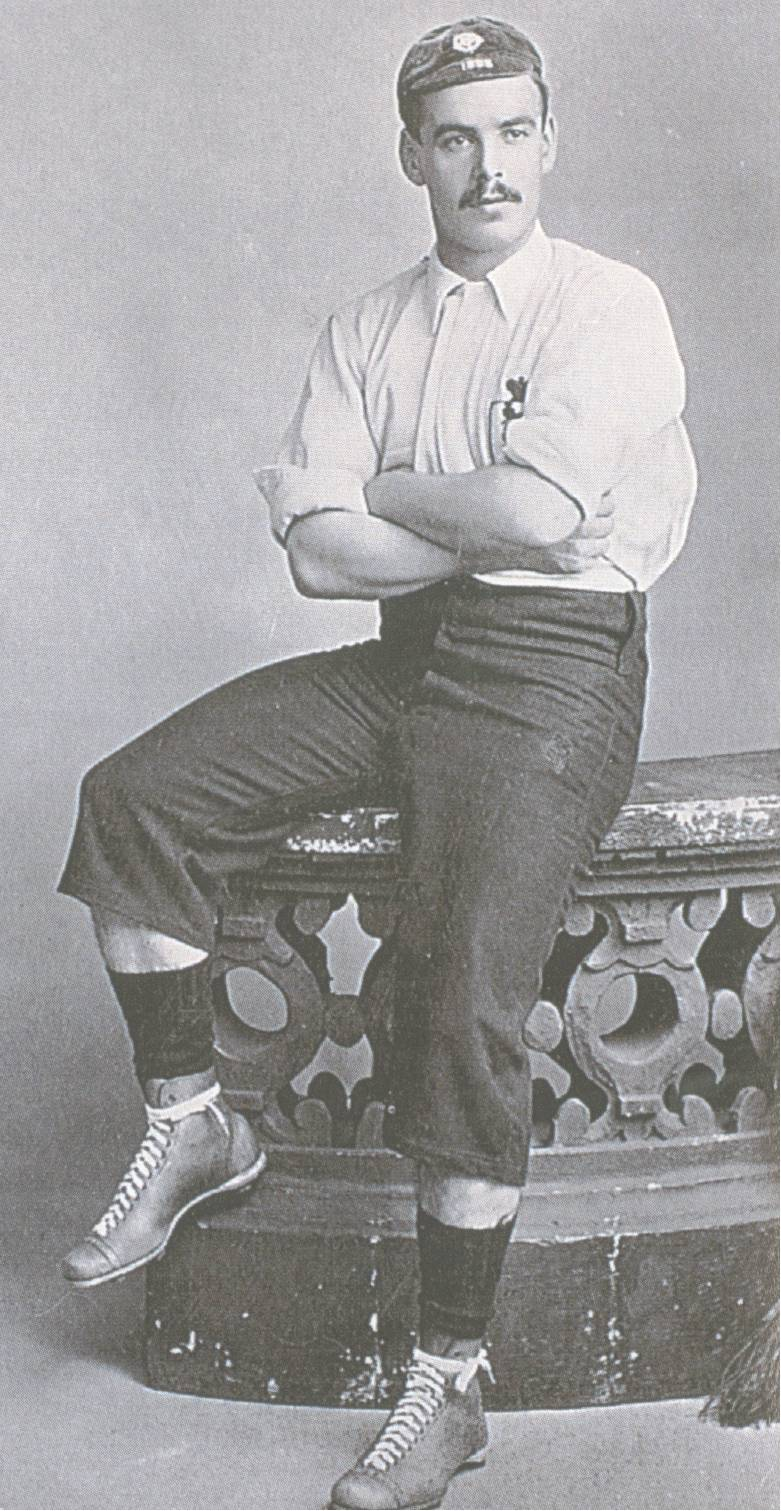
Steve Smith was appointed player-manager in late November.

New Brompton's first game of the season was at their own ground, Priestfield Road, against Bristol Rovers. Cunliffe, Lee, Warrington, Smith, Walker and Morgan all made their debuts in a game which ended in a 1–0 defeat for the home team. A week later, Cunliffe scored the team's first goal of the season in a 2–1 defeat away to Plymouth Argyle. The Athletic News praised John Martin, New Brompton's goalkeeper, for keeping the score down. Cunliffe added two more goals in New Brompton's first victory of the campaign, a 4–3 win at home to Brighton & Hove Albion on 15 September. After New Brompton lost 3–0 to last-placed Reading, Cunliffe took his total to four goals in five games with the first in a 2–0 win over Watford in New Brompton's final match of September. Enoch Lunn, a forward signed from Chesterfield Town, made his debut against Watford in place of Warrington. In both of the first two games of October, away to Northampton Town and at home to Queens Park Rangers (QPR), New Brompton conceded a goal, equalised, and went on to win 2–1 after Cunliffe scored a second goal. The win over QPR moved New Brompton into the top half of the league table.

Following three consecutive wins, the team began a run of six games without victory. On 20 October, New Brompton lost 2–1 away to Fulham, the previous season's Southern League champions. A week later, they lost 2–0 at home to Southampton, having to play for 70 of the 90 minutes with only ten players after Walker was injured.^{[a]} Lunn's first goal for the team secured a 1–1 draw against West Ham United in the final game of November but New Brompton then lost three consecutive games without scoring a goal, being defeated 1–0 at home to Tottenham Hotspur, 2–0 away to Swindon Town, and 1–0 at home to Norwich City. Following this run, New Brompton had slipped to 19th in the league table. In the final week of November, the club's board of directors took the decision to appoint Smith to the position of player-manager; it was the first time the club had appointed someone specifically as team manager, distinct from Groombridge's role as club secretary. New Brompton's first match following Smith's appointment resulted in a 2–0 victory away to Luton Town on 1 December, ending a winless run which stretched back to mid-October.

On 8 December, New Brompton drew 2–2 at home to West Ham despite both Walker and Lunn being missing due to injury and Mavin due to influenza. A week later they lost 3–0 to Brentford; the Athletic News wrote that New Brompton never recovered from the inauspicious start of Bill Floyd scoring an own goal. Cunliffe took his goal tally for the season into double figures when he scored twice in a 2–1 victory at home to Millwall on 22 December, but failed to score against his former team on Christmas Day as New Brompton lost 3–1 away to Portsmouth. The team's final game of 1906 was away to Bristol Rovers on 29 December and resulted in a 4–0 defeat; the game was the last Warrington played for the club. New Brompton finished the calendar year once again in 19th place in the table, ahead only of Northampton.

=== January–April ===
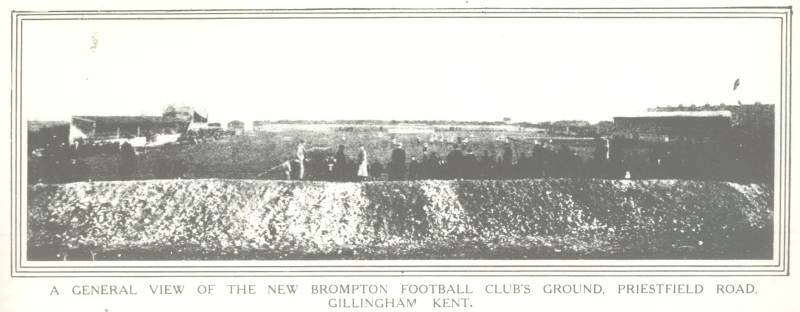
New Brompton began 1907 with a defeat at their home ground, Priestfield Road.

New Brompton began 1907 with a third consecutive defeat and a second in a row without scoring a goal, losing 2–0 to Plymouth at Priestfield Road on 5 January; Morgan missed a penalty kick. A forward named Daws made his debut in the next league game against Brighton and scored a goal, but New Brompton lost 4–1. In the team's final game of January, New Brompton dominated play against Reading but failed to score; both Hartley and Cunliffe had apparent goals disallowed for offside and the game finished 0–0. The team's first league win of 1907 came at the fourth attempt on 9 February as goals from Hartley, Bill Godley and Smith gave them a 3–1 victory over fellow strugglers Northampton. Godley made his debut in the game having joined New Brompton from Reading. Four days after the victory, New Brompton lost 2–1 at home to Leyton. The game, which was originally scheduled to be played on Boxing Day but was postponed due to snow, drew an attendance of only 1,000, the lowest of the season at Priestfield Road.

On 16 February, New Brompton lost 3–0 away to Queens Park Rangers and the team's winless run was extended to four games with 1–1 draws against both Fulham and Southampton. William Marriott scored New Brompton's goal in both games, having not previously scored since September. On 16 March, New Brompton lost 2–0 away to Tottenham. The result made Tottenham the second team of the season to defeat New Brompton both at home and away without conceding a goal. In the next game, against Watford on 20 March, New Brompton took the lead after just three minutes, fell behind to two goals from their opponents, but came away with a draw after Cunliffe scored his first goal since December. The reporter for the Bucks Examiner wrote that "Brompton were good value for a draw" and praised Martin's performance in goal. The team ended their run of games without a victory by defeating Swindon at Priestfield Road on 23 March; after both teams had scored in the first half, a goal late in the game from Smith made the final score 2–1. The final two games of March resulted in draws against Leyton and Norwich.

New Brompton's first game of April was at home to Portsmouth, who were challenging Fulham for the Southern League championship. Hartley gave New Brompton the lead in the first half and Marriott scored after the interval. Despite having to play much of the second half with ten men while Walker was off the pitch receiving treatment for an injury, New Brompton won 2–0. Following a goalless draw with Luton, New Brompton beat Crystal Palace 3–1; Hartley scored all three goals in the victory, the team's only hat-trick of the season. He added two more a week later as the team defeated Brentford 5–0, their biggest victory of the season; the correspondent for the Daily Telegraph wrote that Brentford's defence went "all to pieces" as New Brompton scored three goals in the second half. It was the first time since October that New Brompton had won two consecutive matches. Hartley was absent for the game against Millwall on 27 April with Godley playing in his place. The team's unbeaten run came to an end after seven games with a 2–0 defeat. Two days later, New Brompton played their final game of the season. Hartley was back in the line-up and scored twice in a 4–2 victory at home to Crystal Palace, meaning that he had scored seven goals in his final three appearances of the season after only scoring three times in the previous eighteen. The result meant that New Brompton finished the season in 16th place in the league table.

=== League match details ===
Key

- In result column, New Brompton's score shown first
- H = Home match
- A = Away match
- pen. = Penalty kick
- o.g. = Own goal

Results
Date	Opponents	Result	Goalscorers	Attendance
1 September 1906	Bristol Rovers (H)	0–1		5,000
8 September 1906	Plymouth Argyle (A)	1–2	Cunliffe	8,000
15 September 1906	Brighton & Hove Albion (H)	4–3	Cunliffe (2), Smith, Marriott	5,000
22 September 1906	Reading (A)	0–3		5,000
29 September 1906	Watford (H)	2–0	Cunliffe (pen.), Hitch (o.g.)	5,000
6 October 1906	Northampton Town (A)	2–1	Lee, Cunliffe	4,000
13 October 1906	Queens Park Rangers (H)	2–1	Marriott, Cunliffe	6,000
20 October 1906	Fulham (A)	1–2	Lee	14,000
27 October 1906	Southampton (H)	0–2		6,000
3 November 1906	West Ham United (A)	1–1	Lunn	7,000
10 November 1906	Tottenham Hotspur (H)	0–1		6,500
17 November 1906	Swindon Town (A)	0–2		3,000
24 November 1906	Norwich City (H)	0–1		4,000
1 December 1906	Luton Town (A)	2–0	Cunliffe (2)	3,500
8 December 1906	West Ham United (H)	2–2	Cunliffe, Warrington	4,000
15 December 1906	Brentford (A)	0–3		6,000
22 December 1906	Millwall (H)	2–1	Cunliffe (2)	3,500
25 December 1906	Portsmouth (A)	1–3	Lee	15,000
29 December 1906	Bristol Rovers (A)	0–4		5,000
5 January 1907	Plymouth Argyle (H)	0–2		4,800
19 January 1907	Brighton & Hove Albion (A)	1–4	Daws	5,000
26 January 1907	Reading (H)	0–0		3,000
9 February 1907	Northampton Town (H)	3–1	Hartley, Godley, Smith	3,000
13 February 1907	Leyton (H)	1–2	Mavin (pen.)	1,000
16 February 1907	Queens Park Rangers (A)	0–3		8,000
23 February 1907	Fulham (H)	1–1	Marriott	5,500
2 March 1907	Southampton (A)	1–1	Marriott	4,000
16 March 1907	Tottenham Hotspur (A)	0–2		6,000
20 March 1907	Watford (A)	2–2	Lee, Cunliffe	2,000
23 March 1907	Swindon Town (H)	2–1	Hartley, Smith	5,000
29 March 1907	Leyton (A)	0–0		5,000
30 March 1907	Norwich City (A)	2–2	Cunliffe, Thompson (o.g.)	4,500
1 April 1907	Portsmouth (H)	2–0	Hartley, Marriott	7,000
6 April 1907	Luton Town (H)	0–0		4,000
13 April 1907	Crystal Palace (A)	3–1	Hartley (3)	5,000
20 April 1907	Brentford (H)	5–0	Hartley (2), Marriott (2), Cunliffe	4,000
27 April 1907	Millwall (A)	0–2		4,000
29 April 1907	Crystal Palace (H)	4–2	Hartley (2), Cunliffe, Smith	3,000

=== Partial league table ===
Southern League Division One final table, bottom positions
Pos	Team	Pld	W	D	L	GF	GA	GAv	Pts
15	Plymouth Argyle	38	10	13	15	43	50	0.860	33
16	New Brompton	38	12	9	17	47	59	0.797	33
17	Swindon Town	38	11	11	16	43	54	0.796	33
18	Queens Park Rangers	38	11	10	17	47	55	0.855	32
19	Crystal Palace	38	8	9	21	46	66	0.697	25
20	Northampton Town	38	5	9	24	29	88	0.330	19

== FA Cup ==
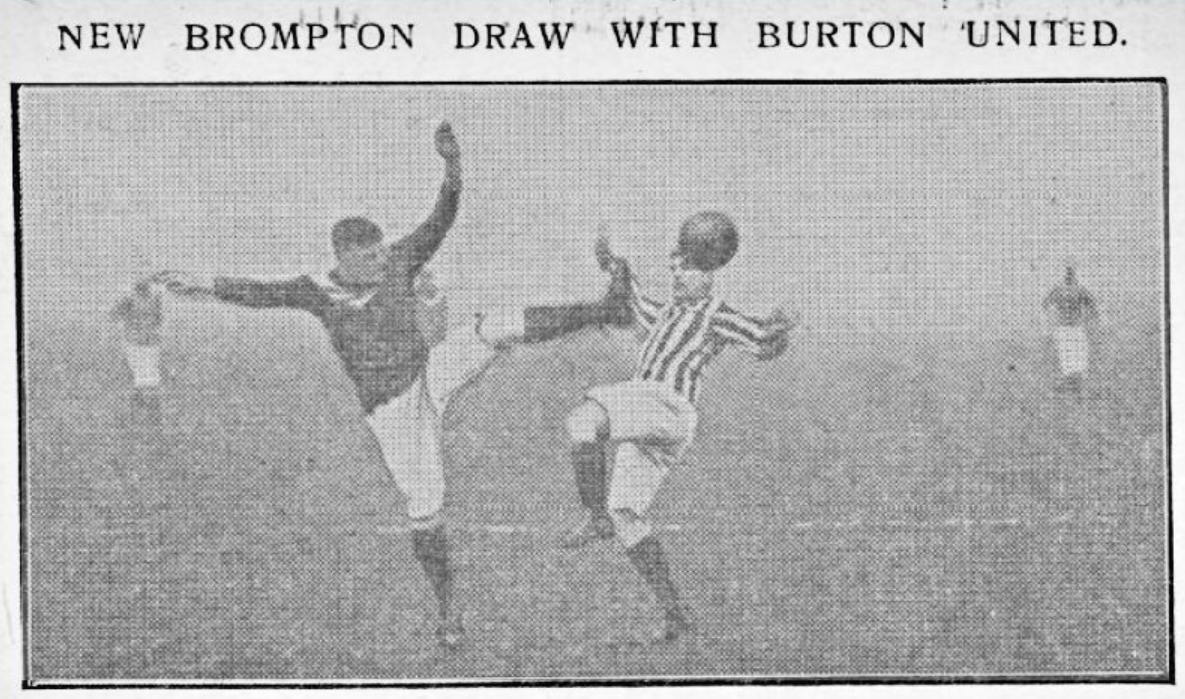
Action from the FA Cup first round replay against Burton United

As a Southern League Division One team, New Brompton were exempt from the qualifying rounds of the 1906–07 FA Cup and entered the competition in the first round proper in January; their opponents were Burton United of the Football League Second Division. The match at Burton's ground, Peel Croft, ended in a 0–0 draw, necessitating a replay at Priestfield Road, which took place four days later. The second match was also goalless at the end of the regulation ninety minutes; New Brompton's Morgan had an apparent goal disallowed for offside. The match went to extra time, but ten minutes into the extra half hour, with the score still 0–0, the referee decided that it was too dark to continue and abandoned the game. The second replay took place at a neutral venue, Fulham's Craven Cottage. After a Burton player scored an own goal, Hartley added a second goal and New Brompton won 2–0.

In the second round, New Brompton played Bury of the Football League First Division, who had won the competition twice in the previous seven seasons. It was the first time New Brompton had played a team from the First Division in a competitive match. Although the correspondent for the Daily Mirror wrote that New Brompton "played cleverer football" and had repeated shots on goal, the match at Bury's Gigg Lane ground remained goalless until the final minute; with what proved to be the last kick of the game, Peter Gildea scored for Bury to secure a 1–0 victory and eliminate New Brompton from the competition.

=== Cup match details ===
Key

- In result column, New Brompton's score shown first
- H = Home match
- A = Away match
- N = Match held at a neutral venue
- pen. = Penalty kick
- o.g. = Own goal

Results

Date	Round	Opponents	Result	Goalscorers	Attendance
12 January 1907	First	Burton United (A)	0–0		3,000
16 January 1907	First (replay)	Burton United (H)	0–0^{[a]}		5,000
21 January 1907	First (second replay)	Burton United (N)	2–0	Wood (o.g.), Hartley	5,000
2 February 1907	Second	Bury (A)	0–1		10,019

a. Match abandoned during extra time

== Players ==
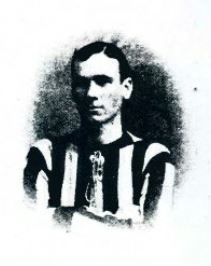
Goalkeeper John Martin was one of two players to appear in every one of New Brompton's games during the season. At the time, goalkeepers wore the same colours as their teammates.

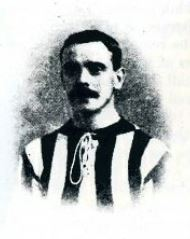
Joe Elliott appeared seven times during the season.

During the season, 21 players made at least one appearance for New Brompton. Smith and Martin made the most, both appearing in all 42 of the team's competitive games. Cunliffe missed only two games and three other players made more than 35 appearances. Two players, Albert Webb and J. Brisley, played only once and four others played in five games or fewer. Ten players scored at least one goal for the team. Cunliffe was the top scorer with 15 goals, all in the league. Hartley also reached double figures, scoring 10 times in the league and once in the FA Cup. No other player scored more than six goals.

Player statistics
Player	Position	Southern League		FA Cup		Total	
Player	Position	Apps	Goals	Apps	Goals	Apps	Goals
J. Brisley	FB	1	0	0	0	1	0
Dan Cunliffe	FW	36	15	4	0	40	15
Daws	FW	2	1	0	0	2	1
Joe Elliott	HB	6	0	1	0	7	0
Bill Floyd	FB	30	0	4	0	34	0
Bill Godley	FW	5	1	0	0	5	1
Jimmy Hartley	FW	19	10	2	1	21	11
Ernest Harvey	FB	34	0	4	0	38	0
Billy Lee	FW	22	4	2	0	24	4
George Lissenden	HB	5	0	0	0	5	0
George Lloyd	HB	33	0	4	0	37	0
Enoch Lunn	FW	23	1	1	0	24	1
William Marriott	FW	29	6	4	0	33	6
John Martin	GK	38	0	4	0	42	0
Fred Mavin	HB	35	1	4	0	39	1
McKinnell	FB	2	0	0	0	2	0
Billy Morgan	HB	16	0	3	0	19	0
Steve Smith	FW	38	4	4	0	42	4
George Walker	HB	28	0	3	0	31	0
Joe Warrington	FW	15	1	0	0	15	1
Albert Webb	FB	1	0	0	0	1	0

FW = Forward, HB = Half-back, GK = Goalkeeper, FB = Full-back

== Aftermath ==
Cunliffe, the team's top goalscorer, left the club after a single season and joined Millwall. In the following season, his replacement Charlie McGibbon scored 22 goals but New Brompton finished in last place in the league table. Despite this, they were again reprieved from relegation to Division Two. The club, which changed its name to Gillingham in 1912, remained in the Southern League Division One until 1920 when the entire division was absorbed into the Football League to form its new Third Division.

== Footnotes ==
a. The concept of substitutes was not introduced to English football until the 1960s. Previously, if a player had to leave a game due to injury, the team had to continue with a reduced number of players.
