= 1905–06 New Brompton F.C. season =

English football club season

New Brompton
1905–06 season
- Chairman: James Barnes
- Secretary: William Ironside Groombridge
- Southern League Division One: 17th
- FA Cup: Second round
- Top goalscorer: League: Bill Marriott (4); All: Bill Marriott (5)
- Highest home attendance: 5,500 vs Portsmouth (27 January 1906)
- Lowest home attendance: 1,500 vs Millwall (10 February 1906)
Home colours

During the 1905–06 English football season, New Brompton F.C. competed in the Southern League Division One. It was the 12th season in which the club competed in the Southern League and the 11th in Division One. The team began the season in poor form; they failed to score any goals in six of their first eight Southern League games. By the midpoint of the season, the team had won only three times and were close to the bottom of the league table. The team's form improved in the new year, with three wins in the first seven Southern League games of 1906, but they ended the season in similar fashion to how they had started it, failing to score in eight of the final nine league games. New Brompton finished the season in 17th place out of 18 teams in the division.

New Brompton also competed in the FA Cup, reaching the second round. The team played a total of 37 league and cup matches, winning 8, drawing 9 and losing 20. Bill Marriott was the club's top goalscorer, with four goals in the Southern League and one in the FA Cup; this figure was the lowest to date with which a player had finished a season as New Brompton's top scorer. Joe Walton made the most appearances, playing in 36 of the team's 37 competitive games. The highest attendance recorded at the club's home ground, Priestfield Road, was 5,500 for a game against Portsmouth on 27 January 1906.

== Background and pre-season ==
New Brompton, founded in 1893, had played in the Southern League since the competition's formation in 1894. The 1905–06 season was the club's 11th season in Division One, the league's top division, following promotion from Division Two at the first attempt in 1895. In the 1904–05 season New Brompton had finished 9th out of 18 teams in the division, only the third time in 11 seasons that they had finished in the top half of the league table. At the time, only a handful of teams from the south of England played in the ostensibly national Football League, with most of the south's leading teams playing in the Southern League.

The club did not employ a manager at the time and secretary William Ironside Groombridge had overall responsibility for the team. He was assisted by a trainer called F. Craddock. James Barnes was chairman of the club's board of directors. The team wore the club's usual black and white striped shirts. Several new players joined the club prior to the season, including Bill Floyd, a full-back from Gainsborough Trinity, and three forwards, Bill Marriott from Northampton Town, Jim Sheridan from Stoke, and Harry Phillips from Grimsby Town. Walter Leigh, the team's top goalscorer of the previous season, moved on, joining Clapton Orient, newly elected to the Football League Second Division.

== Southern League Division One ==
=== September–December ===
New Brompton lost to Queens Park Rangers in the first game of the Southern League season.

The club's first match of the season, on 2 September, was away to Queens Park Rangers; Floyd, Phillips, Sheridan and Marriott all made their Southern League debuts for New Brompton. Queens Park Rangers scored two goals in each half to win 4–0; the correspondent for The Daily News stated that the home team were "the better side at every point" and well deserved their large victory. The first Southern League game of the season at New Brompton's ground, Priestfield Road, a week later against Bristol Rovers, resulted in a 3–0 win for the away team. Phillips scored New Brompton's first Southern League goal of the season on 16 September and the team achieved their first victory, beating Northampton Town 2–0, before losing again in their next game, a 4–0 defeat away to Portsmouth. After a goalless draw with Swindon Town, New Brompton were 15th out of 18 teams in the Division One table at the end of September.

On 7 October, New Brompton lost 5–0 away to Millwall, the first time the team had conceded as many goals in a Southern League match since December 1903. Two weeks later, they failed to score a goal for the sixth time in eight Southern League games and were defeated 6–0 by Tottenham Hotspur, the team's biggest defeat of the season. The correspondent for the Daily Telegraph said that New Brompton had been "completely outplay[ed]". The team ended the month with their second Southern League victory of the season, a 2–1 win over Brentford. The first match of November, however, resulted in another defeat as New Brompton lost 4–1 to Norwich City; the result left New Brompton 16th in the table. Their record of having conceded 28 goals in 10 games was by far the worst in the division; no other team had conceded more than 20 and only one other had conceded more than 16. The team's winless run continued for the rest of the month as they drew with Plymouth Argyle and Southampton and lost to Reading. John Campbell, a former Scottish international forward newly signed from Hibernian, made his debut against Reading.

New Brompton began December with a game away to Watford; they twice took the lead only for Watford to equalise and the game ended in a draw. The team lost their next two games, away to West Ham United and at home to Fulham. On Christmas Day, New Brompton beat Brighton & Hove Albion 1–0; Campbell scored the winner from a penalty kick, his first goal for the club. New Brompton ended 1905 with a 2–0 home defeat to Queens Park Rangers; John Martin, normally a full-back, played as goalkeeper in place of Fred Griffiths. The Athletic News referred to this as a trial arrangement, but Martin retained the position for most of the remainder of the season. The reporter for the Athletic News wrote that on the whole New Brompton played as well as their opponents but that their forwards "proved quite incapable of turning to account the many openings which fell their way".

=== January–April ===
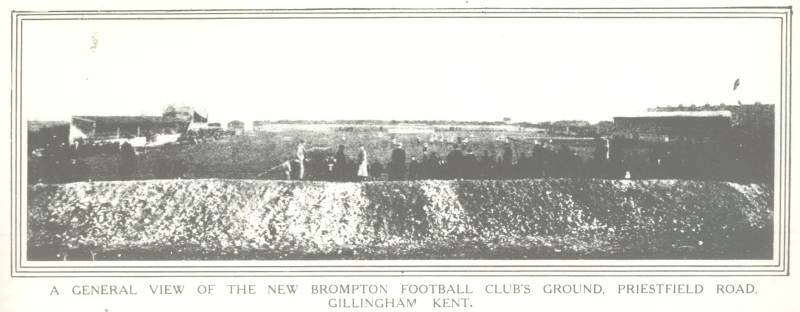
New Brompton won two out of eight league games played at their home ground, Priestfield Road, in the second half of the season.

New Brompton's first Southern League game of 1906 was away to Bristol Rovers, who were reduced to ten men before half-time when their goalkeeper went off injured. For the second time in three games, Campbell scored the winning goal with a penalty kick. The team next beat Northampton Town, the only time during the season that they won two consecutive Southern League games. New Brompton's next game drew an attendance reported at 5,500, the largest of the season at Priestfield Road; the Athletic News attributed the large turnout to "the recent smart performances of the local eleven". The match, however, ended in the first of two consecutive 1–0 defeats for New Brompton.

The team's winless Southern League run extended to four games with defeats away to Luton Town on 17 February and Brentford on 3 March. New Brompton then defeated Tottenham Hotspur, who were second in the league table ahead of the game, at Priestfield Road. Paddy Travers scored the only goal to give his team what the Daily Telegraph's reporter described as their best result of the season; the writer praised the New Brompton defence as "very sound". After this victory, the team played five more games in March and failed to score in any of them. After a goalless draw at home to Norwich City, they lost 5–0 away to Plymouth Argyle. According to the Athletic News, New Brompton were "quite outclassed" by Plymouth and "had [Plymouth] doubled the number of their goals they would have occasioned little surprise". Three further defeats left New Brompton bottom of the table at the end of March. Goalkeeper Harry Metherell, who had played one Southern League game two years earlier but not been included in the team since, was included in the line-up against Reading and retained his place for the rest of the season.

After five games without scoring, New Brompton defeated Watford 2–0 in the first match of April. Their next two games resulted in goalless draws against Brighton & Hove Albion and West Ham United; the Athletic News was again critical of New Brompton's forwards against West Ham, saying that the team's "lack of success was mainly due to the inability of their front line to accept the gifts which the fortune of the game offered". New Brompton's final game of the season was away to Fulham, who had already clinched the championship of Division One, and resulted in a 1–0 defeat. New Brompton finished the season 17th out of 18 teams in the league table, above only Northampton Town. The team had failed to score in eight of the last nine games of the Southern League season; the final total of 20 league goals was half the figure recorded in the previous season and the lowest figure New Brompton had registered in 12 seasons of competitive football.

=== Match details ===
Key

- In result column, New Brompton's score shown first
- H = Home match
- A = Away match
- pen. = Penalty kick
- o.g. = Own goal

Results
Date	Opponents	Result	Goalscorers	Attendance
2 September 1905	Queens Park Rangers (A)	0–4		10,000
9 September 1905	Bristol Rovers (H)	0–3		4,000
16 September 1905	Northampton Town (H)	2–0	Phillips, Elliott	4,000
23 September 1905	Portsmouth (A)	0–4		8,000
30 September 1905	Swindon Town (H)	0–0		4,000
7 October 1905	Millwall (A)	0–5		8,000
14 October 1905	Luton Town (H)	1–1	Marriott	5,000
21 October 1905	Tottenham Hotspur (A)	0–6		14,000
28 October 1905	Brentford (H)	2–1	Burns, Marriott	4,000
4 November 1905	Norwich City (A)	1–4	Burns	6,000
11 November 1905	Plymouth Argyle (H)	1–1	Marriott	3,000
18 November 1905	Southampton (A)	1–1	McKee	4,000
25 November 1905	Reading (H)	0–3		4,000
2 December 1905	Watford (A)	2–2	Marriott, Sheridan	3,000
16 December 1905	West Ham United (A)	0–1		6,000
23 December 1905	Fulham (H)	0–3		4,000
25 December 1905	Brighton & Hove Albion (H)	1–0	Campbell (pen.)	4,000
30 December 1905	Queens Park Rangers (H)	0–2		3,000
6 January 1906	Bristol Rovers (A)	2–1	Beadsworth, Campbell (pen.)	5,000
20 January 1906	Northampton Town (A)	1–0	Burns	3,000
27 January 1906	Portsmouth (H)	0–1		5,500
10 February 1906	Millwall (H)	0–1		1,500
17 February 1906	Luton Town (A)	1–2	White (o.g.)	not recorded
3 March 1906	Brentford (A)	2–3	Beadsworth, Riley (o.g.)	4,000
5 March 1906	Tottenham Hotspur (H)	1–0	Travers	2,500
10 March 1906	Norwich City (H)	0–0		3,500
17 March 1906	Plymouth Argyle (A)	0–5		6,000
19 March 1906	Swindon Town (A)	0–2		not recorded
24 March 1906	Southampton (H)	0–4		2,000
31 March 1906	Reading (A)	0–1		not recorded
7 April 1906	Watford (H)	2–0	Campbell, Beadsworth	3,000
14 April 1906	Brighton & Hove Albion (A)	0–0		4,000
21 April 1906	West Ham United (H)	0–0		3,000
25 April 1906	Fulham (A)	0–1		3,000

=== Partial league table ===
Southern League Division One final table, bottom positions
Pos	Team	Pld	W	D	L	GF	GA	GAv	Pts
15	Swindon Town	34	8	9	17	31	52	0.596	25
16	Brighton & Hove Albion	34	9	7	18	30	55	0.545	25
17	New Brompton	34	7	8	19	20	62	0.323	22
18	Northampton Town	34	8	5	21	32	79	0.405	21

== FA Cup ==
New Brompton entered the 1905–06 FA Cup at the first-round stage, where they played at home to fellow Southern League Division One club Northampton Town. New Brompton took the lead in the first half and, although their opponents equalised after the interval, Marriott scored a winning goal for the home team. In the second round, New Brompton played at home to another Southern League Division One team, Southampton; the match finished 0–0, necessitating a replay at the Dell. Southampton scored the only goal of the second game in the final minute to eliminate New Brompton from the competition.

=== Match details ===
Key

- In result column, New Brompton's score shown first
- H = Home match
- A = Away match
- pen. = Penalty kick
- o.g. = Own goal

Results

Date	Round	Opponents	Result	Goalscorers	Attendance
13 January 1906	First	Northampton Town (H)	2–1	Beadsworth, Marriott	5,000
3 February 1906	Second	Southampton (H)	0–0		4,287
7 February 1906	Second (replay)	Southampton (A)	0–1		7,500

== Players ==
Percy Barnfather made 24 appearances during the season.

Goalkeeper Fred Griffiths played 18 times. At the time, goalkeepers wore the same colours as their teammates.

During the season, 23 players made at least one appearance for New Brompton. Joe Walton made the most; he played in 36 of the team's 37 competitive games, missing only one league game. Travers and Joe Elliott also made 30 or more appearances and four others played more than 25 times. Two players made only one appearance each: Albert Webb and a player recorded only as Page. Marriott was the top goalscorer; he scored four times in the Southern League and once in the FA Cup. His total of five goals was the lowest with which a player had finished a season as top scorer in the club's history. Arthur Beadsworth scored four goals and two players scored three each; no other player scored more than once.

Player statistics
Player	Position	Southern League		FA Cup		Total	
Player	Position	Apps	Goals	Apps	Goals	Apps	Goals
Percy Barnfather	FW	22	0	2	0	24	0
Arthur Beadsworth	FW	21	3	3	1	24	4
Albert Bull	HB	23	0	3	0	26	0
A. Burns	FW	11	3	0	0	11	3
John Campbell	FW	15	3	3	0	18	3
Joe Elliott	HB	32	1	3	0	35	1
Charles Evans	FW	2	0	0	0	2	0
Bill Floyd	FB	24	0	3	0	27	0
Fred Griffiths	GK	18	0	0	0	18	0
George Lloyd	HB	17	0	0	0	17	0
Bill Marriott	FW	27	4	1	1	28	5
John Martin	FB/GK	18	0	3	0	21	0
Fred Maven	HB	24	0	3	0	27	0
James McKee	FW	19	1	0	0	19	1
Harry Metherell	GK	5	0	0	0	5	0
John Orr	FB	8	0	0	0	8	0
Page	FW	1	0	0	0	1	0
Harry Phillips	FW	14	1	3	0	17	1
James Sheridan	FW	8	1	0	0	8	1
George Snelgrove	FW	4	0	0	0	4	0
Paddy Travers	FW	27	1	3	0	30	1
Joe Walton	FB	33	0	3	0	36	0
Albert Webb	FB	1	0	0	0	1	0

FW = Forward, HB = Half-back, GK = Goalkeeper, FB = Full-back

== Aftermath ==
At the annual meeting of the Southern League, the member clubs voted unanimously to increase the number of teams in Division One and New Brompton were re-elected to the division for the subsequent season. The team's performance improved slightly in the following season, as New Brompton finished 16th in a 20-team division. The club, which changed its name to Gillingham in 1912, remained in the Southern League Division One until 1920 when the entire division was absorbed into the Football League to form its new Third Division.
