= List of Gillingham F.C. managers =

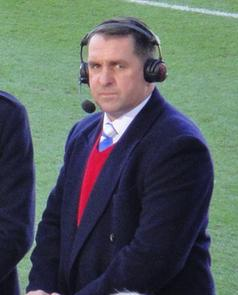
Martin Allen led Gillingham to the Football League Two title in 2013, only the second time the club had won a divisional title in the English Football League.

Gillingham Football Club is an English association football club originally formed in 1893 and known until 1913 as New Brompton F.C. The first man to hold a role equivalent to what is today referred to as a manager was William Ironside Groombridge, who was appointed as club secretary in June 1896 and quickly expanded the role to cover all aspects of team and club administration. Apart from two two-year spells when the club opted to appoint a full-time team manager to allow Groombridge to concentrate solely on club administration, he fulfilled the dual roles of secretary and manager until after the First World War. Upon being admitted to the Football League in May 1920, the club appointed Robert Brown as manager, but he resigned without ever taking charge of a match. He was replaced by Scotsman John McMillan, the club's first non-English manager.

The next significant manager of Gillingham was Archie Clark, under whose management the club returned to the Football League in 1950, having been voted out in 1938. Freddie Cox was the first manager to win a major trophy with Gillingham, taking the Football League Fourth Division championship in the 1963–64 season. Under his successor, Basil Hayward, the club was relegated back to the Fourth Division in the 1970–71 season, but Andy Nelson led the club to promotion back to Division Three three years later. After the Gills were relegated once again in the 1988–89 season, Tony Pulis managed the club to promotion seven years later. Pulis also took the team to the final of the play-offs for promotion to the second tier of English football in the 1998–99 season. Pulis was sacked immediately after this for gross misconduct, but his successor, Peter Taylor, took the club back to the play-off final the following season, in which victory over Wigan Athletic saw the club promoted to Division One for the first time in its history. Peter Taylor left to join Leicester during the close season and club captain Andy Hessenthaler took over as manager for the club's first, and to date only, stint in the second tier.

After Hessenthaler was dismissed following a poor start to the 2004–05 season, the club saw a number of managers come and go in a relatively short time before Mark Stimson's arrival in 2007. His two and a half-year tenure saw the club promoted back to the third tier via the play-offs, but he was dismissed the following season. Hessenthaler then returned to the club for a period of two years before he was promoted to Director of Football to make way for Martin Allen. Allen became only the second manager to win a trophy with the club, leading the team to the League Two championship in 2013, but he was dismissed a few months into the following season after a poor start, following which another former manager, Peter Taylor, returned to the club.

== Managers ==
Statistics are correct up to 16 November 2026 and include all senior competitive peacetime first-team matches. Minor county competitions such as the Kent Senior Cup and Kent Senior Shield are not included as the club rarely, if ever, fielded its first team.

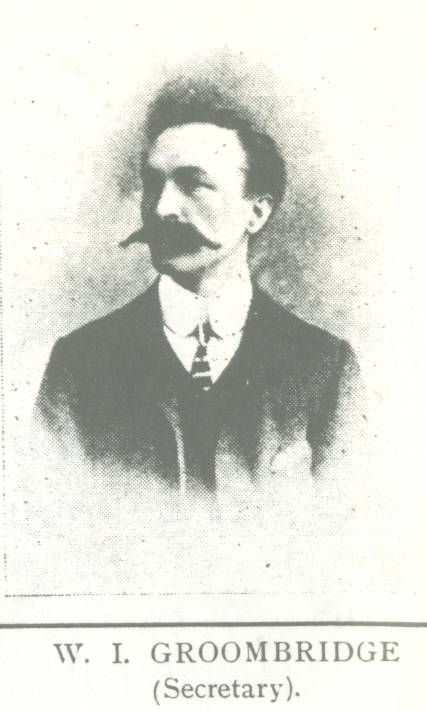
William Ironside Groombridge was the club's secretary, but is considered to have held a role equivalent to that of a modern manager.

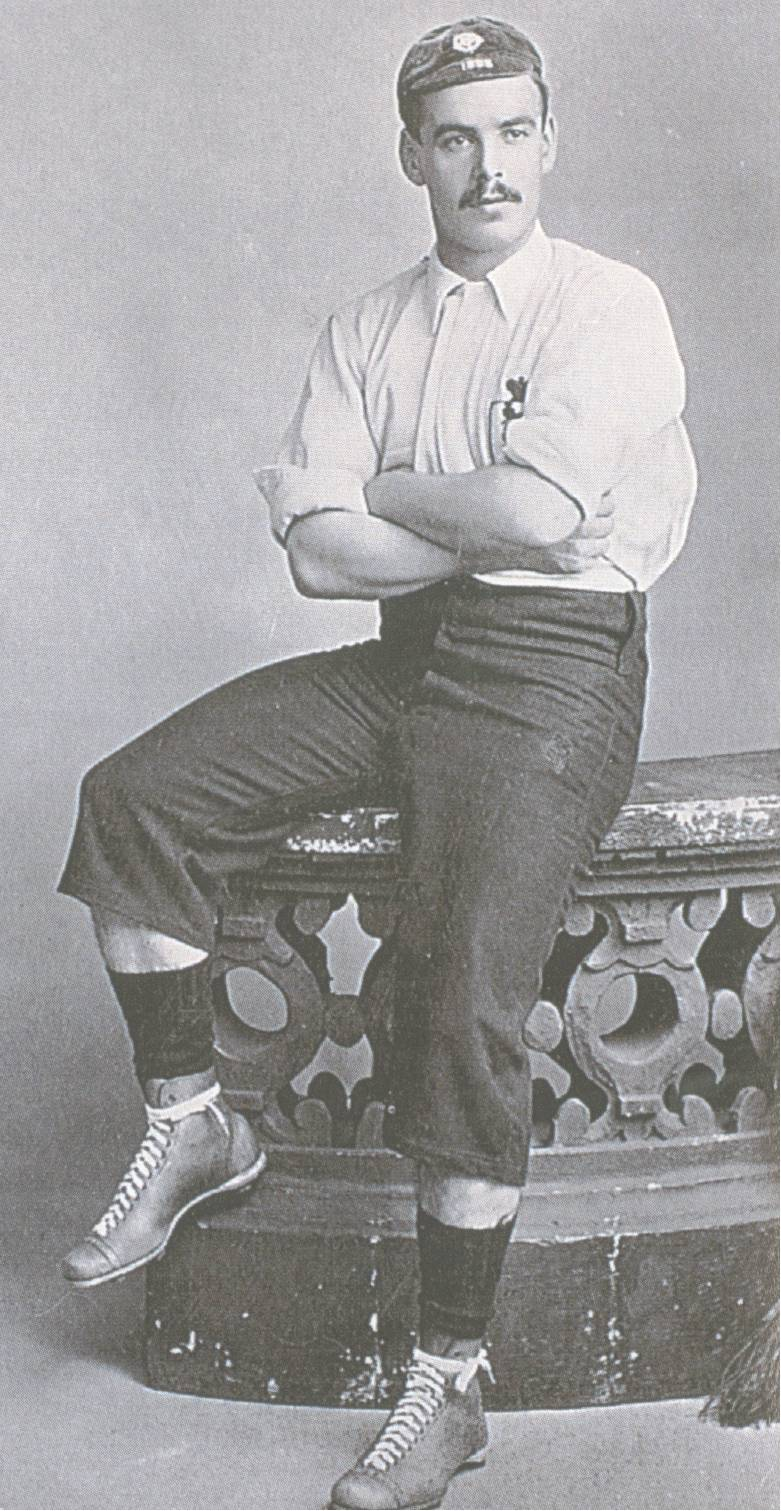
Former England international Steve Smith managed the club for two seasons.

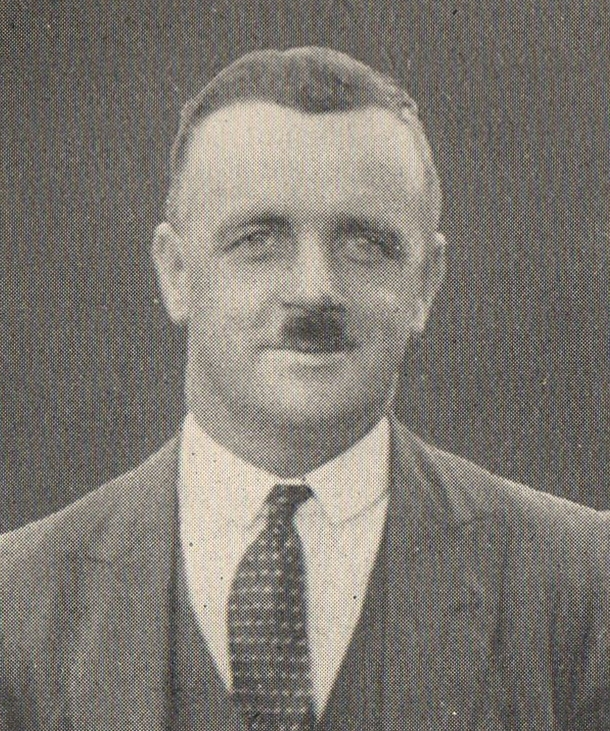
Harry Curtis was appointed in 1923.

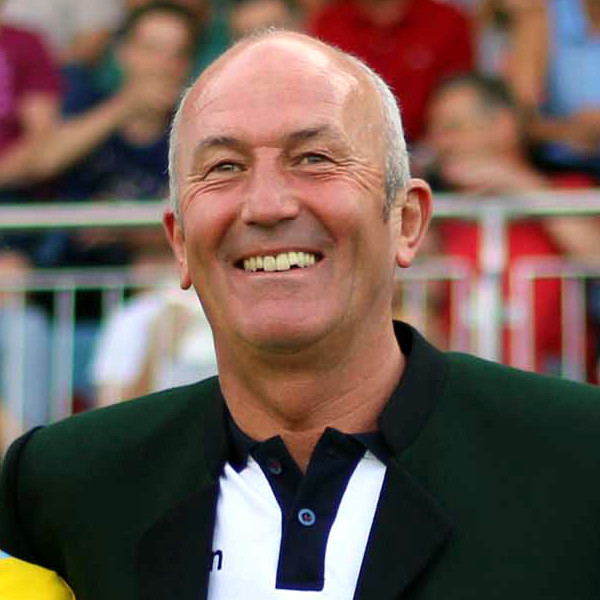
Tony Pulis took over in 1995 and led the Gills to promotion from the Third Division at the first attempt.

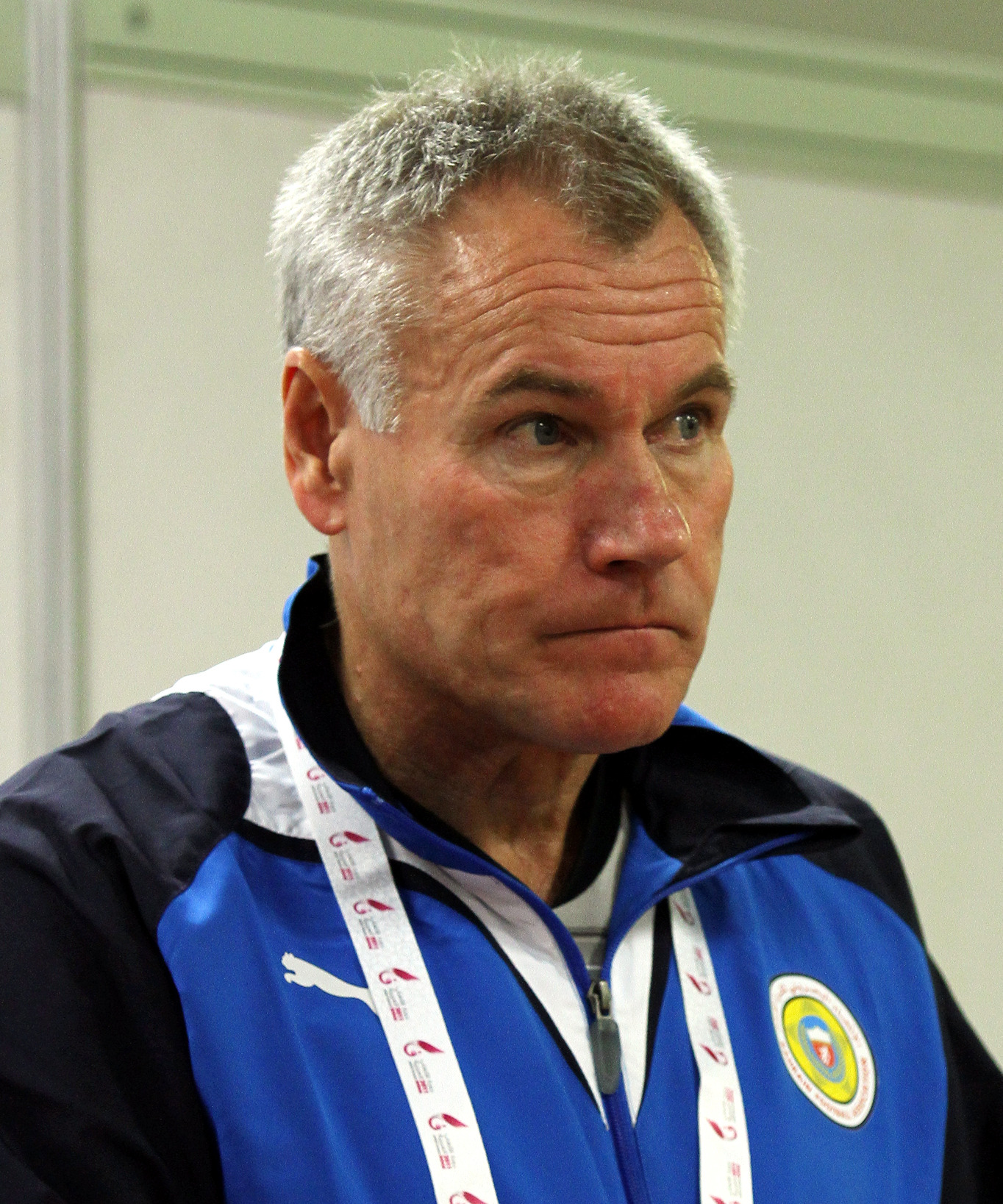
Under Peter Taylor the Gills reached the second tier of English football for the first time.

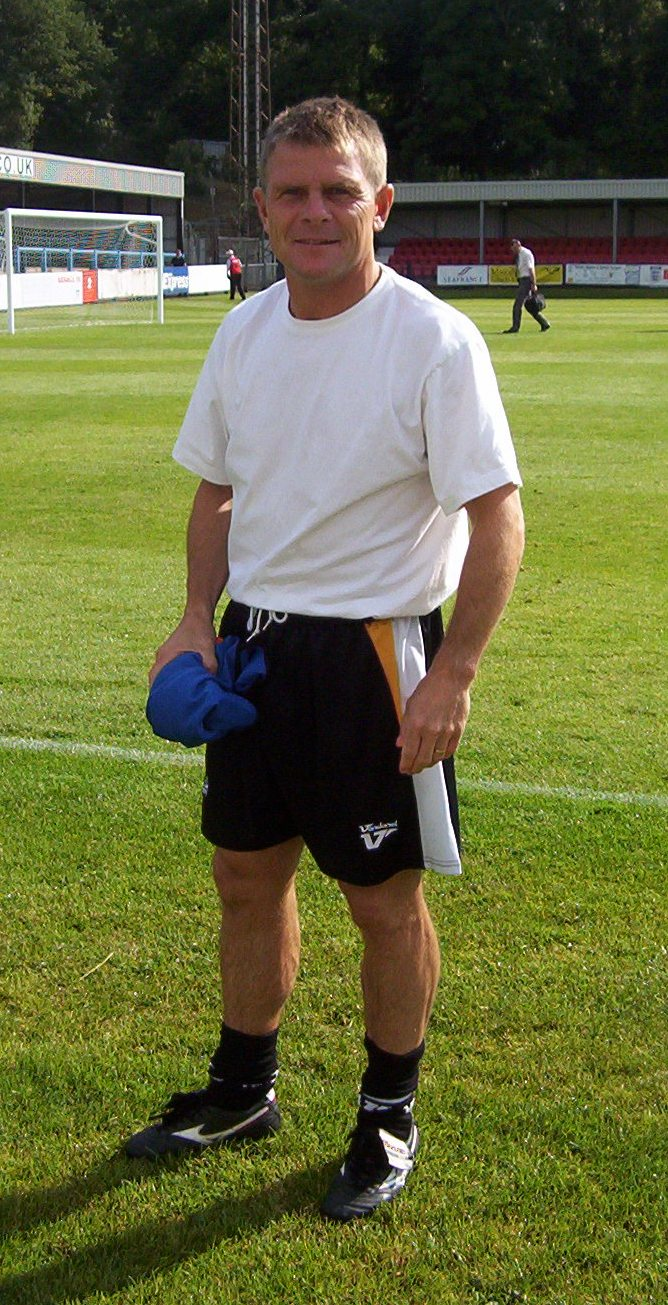
Andy Hessenthaler replaced Taylor as manager in 2000 and returned for a second spell in charge ten years later.

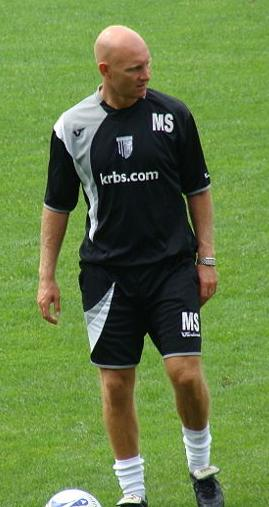
Mark Stimson managed the Gills to promotion in 2009.

Name	Nationality	From	To	P	W	D^{[a]}	L	Win%^{[b]}	Honours	Notes
William Groombridge (secretary)	England	June 1897	Late November 1906	386	151	89	146	39.12		
Steve Smith	England	Late November 1906	Summer 1908	71	20	18	33	28.17		
William Groombridge (secretary)	England	Summer 1908	Summer 1913	212	75	45	92	35.38		
Sam Gilligan	Scotland	July 1913	Summer 1915^{[c]}	81	22	17	42	27.16		
George Collins	England	28 July 1919	12 May 1920	47	11	10	26	23.40		
Robert Brown	England	12 May 1920	9 June 1920	0	0	0	0	—		
Johnny McMillan	Scotland	2 July 1920	3 August 1922	135	42	28	65	31.11		
William Groombridge (secretary)	England	3 August 1922	10 May 1923	44	16	7	21	36.36		
Harry Curtis	England	10 May 1923	30 March 1926	135	45	39	51	33.33		
unknown caretaker		30 March 1926	12 April 1926	4	1	2	1	25.00		
Bert Hoskins	England	12 April 1926	29 March 1929	127	36	31	60	28.35		
unknown caretaker		29 March 1929	7 May 1929	8	1	2	5	12.50		
Dick Hendrie	Scotland	7 May 1929	29 December 1931	108	30	22	56	27.78		
unknown caretaker		29 December 1931	18 January 1932	3	3	0	0	100.00		
Fred Maven	England	19 January 1932	25 May 1937	246	80	56	110	32.52		
Alan Ure	England	26 May 1937	16 June 1938	45	11	6	28	24.44		
Bill Harvey	England	11 July 1938	19 July 1939	48	30	7	11	62.50		
Archie Clark^{[d]}	England	2 August 1939	23 November 1957	577	251	128	198	43.50	Southern League champions 1946–47 and 1948–49, Southern League Cup winners 1946–47, Kent League champions 1945–46	
Harry Barratt	England	23 November 1957	4 May 1962	226	82	54	90	36.28		
Freddie Cox	England	13 June 1962	17 December 1965	172	83	42	47	48.26	Fourth Division champions 1963–64	
Jimmy Boswell (caretaker)	England	17 December 1965	4 January 1966	2	2	0	0	100.00		
Basil Hayward	England	4 January 1966	25 May 1971	282	89	80	113	31.56		
Andy Nelson	England	24 June 1971	3 May 1974	151	66	37	48	43.71		
Len Ashurst	England	6 May 1974	15 October 1975	61	23	19	19	37.70		
Bill Collins (caretaker)	Northern Ireland	15 October 1975	27 October 1975	3	0	1	2	0.00		
Gerry Summers	England	27 October 1975	22 May 1981	292	92	106	94	31.51		
Keith Peacock	England	14 July 1981	29 December 1987	370	161	90	119	43.51		
Paul Taylor	England	29 December 1987	26 October 1988	40	11	8	21	27.50		
Bill Collins; Damien Richardson (caretakers)	Northern Ireland; Ireland	26 October 1988	31 October 1988	1	0	0	1	0.00		
Keith Burkinshaw	England	31 October 1988	11 April 1989	32	8	4	20	25.00		
Keith Blunt (caretaker)	England	11 April 1989	18 April 1989	1	1	0	0	100.00		
Damien Richardson	Ireland	18 April 1989	8 October 1992	173	53	49	71	30.64		
Paul Clark (caretaker)	England	8 October 1992	26 October 1992	2	0	0	2	0.00		
Glenn Roeder	England	26 October 1992	9 July 1993	37	8	12	17	21.62		
Mike Flanagan	England	12 July 1993	28 February 1995	90	20	27	43	22.22		
Neil Smillie (caretaker)	England	28 February	May 1995	10	6	3	1	60.00		
Tony Pulis	Wales	29 June 1995	30 June 1999	218	94	62	62	43.12		
Peter Taylor	England	7 July 1999	12 June 2000	62	34	12	16	54.84	Second Division play-off winners 1999–2000	
Andy Hessenthaler	England	29 June 2000	23 November 2004	228	77	54	97	33.77		
John Gorman (caretaker)	Scotland	23 November 2004	30 November 2004	1	1	0	0	100.00		
Darren Hare; Iwan Roberts; Paul Smith (caretakers)	England; Wales; England	4 December 2004	7 December 2004	1	0	0	1	0.00		
Stan Ternent	England	7 December 2004	15 May 2005	25	7	11	7	28.00		
Neale Cooper	Scotland	21 May 2005	15 November 2005	22	7	5	10	31.82		
Ronnie Jepson	England	15 November 2005	9 September 2007	87	32	16	39	36.78		
Iffy Onuora; Mick Docherty (caretakers)	Scotland; England	9 September 2007	8 October 2007	5	2	1	2	40.00		
Iffy Onuora (caretaker)	Scotland	8 October 2007	1 November 2007	4	2	2	0	50.00		
Mark Stimson	England	1 November 2007	10 May 2010	144	48	41	55	33.33	2009 Football League Two play-off final winners	
Andy Hessenthaler	England	21 May 2010	8 May 2012	101	39	29	33	38.61		
Martin Allen	England	5 July 2012	13 October 2013	64	27	17	20	42.19	Football League Two champions 2012–13	
Peter Taylor	England	14 October 2013	31 December 2014	67	23	14	30	34.33		
Andy Hessenthaler; Steve Lovell; Darren Hare; Mark Patterson (caretakers)	England; Wales; England; England	31 December 2014	7 February 2015	8	3	2	3	37.50		
Justin Edinburgh	England	7 February 2015	3 January 2017	102	40	26	36	39.22		
Adrian Pennock	England	4 January 2017	25 September 2017	32	6	11	15	18.75		
Peter Taylor (caretaker)	England	25 September 2017	12 October 2017	4	1	1	2	25.00		
Steve Lovell	Wales	12 October 2017	26 April 2019	92	32	26	34	34.78		^{[e]}
Mark Patterson (caretaker)	England	26 April 2019	4 May 2019	2	1	0	1	50.00		
Steve Evans	Scotland	1 June 2019	9 January 2022	129	41	41	47	31.78		
Steve Lovell (caretaker)	Wales	10 January 2022	31 January 2022	4	0	1	3	0.00		
Neil Harris	England	31 January 2022	5 October 2023	90	31	25	34	34.44		^{[f]}
Keith Millen (caretaker)	England	5 October 2023	1 November 2023	6	2	0	4	33.33		
Stephen Clemence	England	1 November 2023	29 April 2024	34	12	9	13	35.29		
Mark Bonner	England	7 May 2024	5 January 2025	28	9	4	15	32.14		
John Coleman	England	5 January 2025	25 March 2025	14	2	7	5	14.29		
Gareth Ainsworth	England	25 March 2025	Present	80	24	27	29	30.00		

== Notes ==
a. Drawn matches decided by penalty shoot-outs are counted as draws.
b. Win% is rounded to two decimal places.
c. Competitive football was abandoned after the 1914–15 season due to the escalation of the First World War and did not resume until 1919. Gilligan did not return to the club after the war.
d. Clark's statistics include three matches (two wins and one defeat) played at the start of the 1939–40 season before competitive football was abandoned due to the outbreak of the Second World War.
e. Soccerbase erroneously includes the final two games of the 2018–19 season in Lovell's statistics even though he was dismissed on 26 April 2019.
f. Soccerbase erroneously includes the six games between the dismissal of Harris and the appointment of Clemence in the former's total.
