= 1903–04 Rangers F.C. season =

Rangers
1903–04 season
- Chairman: James Henderson
- Manager: William Wilton
- Ground: Ibrox Park
- Scottish League Division One: 3rd P26 W16 D6 L4 F80 A33 Pts38
- Scottish Cup: Runners-up
- Top goalscorer: League: Robert Hamilton (28); All: Robert Hamilton (31)

The 1903–04 season was the 30th season of competitive football by Rangers.

== Overview ==
Rangers played a total of 31 competitive matches during the 1903–04 season. The club finished fourth in Scottish League Division One, five points behind champions Third Lanark. Rangers was equal on points with third placed Celtic and a point behind second placed Hearts.

The Scottish Cup campaign ended in a 3–2 cup final defeat to the club's Old Firm rivals. A Finlay Speedie brace was not enough to win them the cup.

== Results ==
All results are written with Rangers' score first.

=== Scottish League Division One ===
Date	Opponent	Venue	Result	Attendance	Scorers
15 August 1903	Third Lanark	H	4–3	7,000	Hamilton (3), Smith
22 August 1903	Airdrieonians	A	3–1	10,000	Stark, Speedie, Hamilton
29 August 1903	St Mirren	H	2–2	10,000	Hamilton, Walker
5 September 1903	Motherwell	A	5–2	6,000	Hamilton (4), Speedie
19 September 1903	Heart of Midlothian	H	5–1	9,000	Hamilton (3), Walker (2)
26 September 1903	Queen's Park	H	5–0	14,000	Hamilton (2), Robertson (pen), Walker, Mackie
28 September 1903	Partick Thistle	A	4–1	8,000	Speedie, Robertson (pen), Walker, Smith
10 October 1903	Third Lanark	H	0–1	25,000	
17 October 1903	Celtic	A	0–0	25,000	
24 October 1903	Greenock Morton	A	3–1	4,000	Speedie, Walker, Robertson
31 October 1903	Dundee	H	6–1	10,300	Walker (2), Hamilton (2), Mackie, Jeffrey (og)
7 November 1903	Queen's Park	A	3–2	16,000	Speedie, Hamilton, Drummond
14 November 1903	Hibernian	H	1–1	8,000	Hamilton
21 November 1903	Dundee	A	1–3	14,400	Smith
28 November 1903	Greenock Morton	A	5–0	3,000	Hamilton (2), Walker (2), Speedie
5 December 1903	Kilmarnock	A	2–2	3,000	Smith, Unknown
12 December 1903	Motherwell	H	3–0	3,000	Mackie (2), Hamilton
19 December 1903	Port Glasgow	A	1–1	4,000	Mackie
26 December 1903	Hibernian	A	2–1	6,000	Hamilton, Robertson
1 January 1904	Celtic	A	2–2	30,000	Speedie, Mackie
2 January 1904	Partick Thistle	H	2–0	6,000	Walker, Hamilton
9 January 1904	St Mirren	A	4–5		Mackie (2), Hamilton (2)
16 January 1904	Kilmarnock	H	3–0	4,000	Mackie Hamilton, Donaghy
30 January 1904	Heart of Midlothian	A	1–2	12,000	Mackie
13 February 1904	Port Glasgow	H	8–1	3,500	Speedie (3), Hamilton (2), Smith, Campbell, Gibson
16 March 1904	Airdrieonians	H	5–0	6,000	Mackie (2), Donaghy, Chalk, Stark

=== Scottish Cup ===
Date	Round	Opponent	Venue	Result	Attendance	Scorers
23 January 1904	R1	Heart of Midlothian	H	3–2	30,000	Walker (2), Hamilton
6 February 1904	R2	Hibernian	A	2–1	17,000	Mackie, Walker
20 February 1904	QF	St Mirren	A	1–0	17,000	Hamilton
5 March 1904	SF	Greenock Morton	H	3–0	10,000	Walker (2), Hamilton
16 April 1904	F	Celtic	N	2–3	50,000	Speedie (2)

== Appearances ==
Player	Position	Appearances	Goals
(Scotland) Matthew Dickie	GK	15	0
(Scotland) Nicol Smith	DF	27	1
(Scotland) Alex Fraser	DF	18	0
(Scotland) Neilly Gibson	MF	17	1
(Scotland) James Stark	DF	27	2
(Scotland) John Walker	FW	26	16
(Scotland) Alec Mackie	FW	28	13
(Scotland) Robert Hamilton	FW	28	31
(Scotland) Finlay Speedie	FW	28	12
(Scotland) Alec Smith	FW	21	4
(Scotland) George Henderson	DF	23	0
(Scotland) Jock Drummond	DF	15	0
(Scotland) Angus McDonald	MF	1	0
(Scotland) Jimmy Hartley	MF	4	0
(Scotland) Duncan Campbell	DF	4	1
(Scotland) Harry Dinsmore	MF	1	0
(Scotland) John Watson	GK	16	0
(Scotland) Robert Neil	DF	5	0
(Scotland) Josiah Gray	MF	1	0
(Scotland) Charles Chalk	MF	4	1
(Scotland) Thomas Paton	MF	2	0
(Scotland) Charles Donaghy	FW	6	2
(Scotland) Jock Finlay	FW	1	0

== See also ==
- 1903–04 in Scottish football
- 1903–04 Scottish Cup
