= Thomas Paton (disambiguation) =

Thomas Paton may refer to:

- Thomas Angus Lyall Paton or Angus Paton, (1905–1999), British civil engineer
- Tom Paton (ice hockey) (1854–1909), Canadian goaltender
- Tom Paton (footballer), (1881–1922), Scottish footballer
- Tam Paton (born Thomas Dougal Paton, 1938–2009), manager of the Bay City Rollers

== See also ==
- Tom Patton (born 1953), American politician
- Thomas Patten (disambiguation)
