= Thomas Patten =

Thomas Patten may refer to:

- Thomas G. Patten (1861–1939), U.S. Representative from New York
- Thomas Patten (socialist) (1910–1936), Irish combatant in the Spanish Civil War
- Thomas Diery Patten (1926–1999), Scottish engineer

== See also ==
- Thomas Paton (disambiguation)
