= 1903–04 in Scottish football =

Period in Scottish Football

Football in Scotland
- Season: 1903–04

1903–04 in Scottish football

Division One champions
- Third Lanark

Division Two champions
- Hamilton Academical

Scottish Cup winners
- Celtic

Junior Cup winners
- Vale of Clyde

Scotland national team
- 1904 BHC

The 1903–04 season was the 31st season of competitive football in Scotland and the 14th season of the Scottish Football League.

== League competitions ==
=== Scottish League Division One ===
Pos	Team	Pld	W	D	L	GF	GA	GD	Pts	Qualification or relegation
1	Third Lanark (C)	26	20	3	3	61	26	+35	43	Champions
2	Heart of Midlothian	26	18	3	5	63	35	+28	39	
=3	Celtic	26	18	2	6	68	27	+41	38	
=3	Rangers	26	16	6	4	80	33	+47	38	
5	Dundee	26	13	2	11	54	45	+9	28	
=6	St Mirren	26	11	5	10	45	38	+7	27	
=6	Partick Thistle	26	10	7	9	46	41	+5	27	
8	Queen's Park	26	6	9	11	28	47	−19	21	
9	Port Glasgow Athletic	26	8	4	14	32	49	−17	20	
10	Hibernian	26	7	5	14	29	40	−11	19	
=11	Morton	26	7	4	15	32	53	−21	18	
=11	Airdrieonians	26	7	4	15	32	62	−30	18	
13	Motherwell	26	6	3	17	26	61	−35	15	
14	Kilmarnock	26	4	5	17	24	63	−39	13	

Source: nozdrul.plus.com
(C) Champions

Champions: Third Lanark

=== Scottish League Division Two ===
Pos	Team	Pld	W	D	L	GF	GA	GD	Pts	Qualification
1	Hamilton Academical (C)	22	16	5	1	56	19	+37	37	
2	Clyde	22	12	5	5	51	36	+15	29	
3	Ayr	22	11	6	5	34	31	+3	28	
4	Falkirk	22	11	4	7	50	36	+14	26	
5	East Stirlingshire	22	8	5	9	35	40	−5	21	
5	Raith Rovers	22	8	5	9	40	38	+2	21	
7	Leith Athletic	22	8	4	10	42	40	+2	20	
7	St Bernard's	22	9	2	11	31	43	−12	20	
9	Albion Rovers	22	8	5	9	47	37	+10	19 (Note: Albion Rovers were docked two points.)	
10	Abercorn	22	6	4	12	40	55	−15	16	
11	Arthurlie	22	5	5	12	37	50	−13	15	
12	Ayr Parkhouse (R)	22	3	4	15	24	62	−38	10	Did not apply for re-election (Note: Ayr Parkhouse did not apply for re-election to compete for the next season and were replaced by Aberdeen.)

Source: statto.com
Rules for classification: Teams finish equal if level on points. Points system: 2 points for a win, 1 point for a draw, 0 points for a loss
(C) Champions; (R) Relegated

== Other honours ==
=== Cup honours ===
==== National ====
Competition	Winner	Score	Runner-up
Scottish Cup	Celtic	3 – 2	Rangers
Scottish Qualifying Cup	Arbroath	4 – 2	Albion Rovers
Scottish Junior Cup	Vale of Clyde	3 – 0	Parkhead

==== County ====
Competition	Winner	Score	Runner-up
Aberdeenshire Cup	Aberdeen	3 – 2	Bon Accord
Ayrshire Cup	Galston	4 – 1	Beith
Border Cup	Selkirk	2 – 0 (Note: Second replay needed.)	Peebles Rovers
East of Scotland Shield	Hearts	7 – 2	St Bernard's
Fife Cup	Cowdenbeath	RR (Note: Group stage - round robin format.)	Kirkcaldy United
Forfarshire Cup	Dundee Wanderers	3 – 0	Montrose
Glasgow Cup	Third Lanark	1 – 0 (Note: Replay needed.)	Celtic
Lanarkshire Cup	Airdrie	1 – 0 (Note: Result disputed.)	Hamilton
Linlithgowshire Cup	Broxburn	2 – 0	Bathgate
North of Scotland Cup	Clachnacuddin	2 – 1	Inverness Citadel
Perthshire Cup	Dunblane	3 – 2	St Johnstone
Renfrewshire Cup	St Mirren	5 – 1 (Note: Aggregate over two legs.)	Morton
Southern Counties Cup	Nithsdale Wanderers	4 – 1	Vale of Dryfe
Stirlingshire Cup	Falkirk	4 – 3	East Stirling

=== Non-league honours ===
Highland League

Top Three
Pos	Team	Pld	W	D	L	GF	GA	GD	Pts
1	Clachnacuddin	12	11	0	1	51	10	+41	22
2	Inverness Citadel	12	6	3	3	26	26	0	15
3	Inverness Thistle	11	6	0	5	30	17	+13	12

Source: SFHA

Other Senior Leagues

Division	Winner
Banffshire & District League	Buckie Thistle
Border Senior League	Vale of Leithen
Central League	Dunblane
Midland League	unfinished
Northern League	Montrose
Perthshire League	Tullich
Scottish Combination	Royal Albert

== Scotland national team ==
Date	Venue	Opponents	Score (Note: Scotland's score is shown first.)	Competition	Scotland scorer(s)
12 March 1904	Dens Park, Dundee (H)	Wales	1–1	BHC	Robert Walker
26 March 1904	Dalymount Park, Dublin (A)	Ireland	1–1	BHC	Robert Hamilton
4 April 1904	Celtic Park, Glasgow (H)	England	0–1	BHC	

Key:

- (H) = Home match
- (A) = Away match
- BHC = British Home Championship

Team	Pld	W	D	L	GF	GA	GD	Pts
England (C)	3	2	1	0	6	3	+3	5
Ireland	3	1	1	1	3	4	−1	3
Scotland	3	0	2	1	2	3	−1	2
Wales	3	0	2	1	3	4	−1	2

Rules for classification: 1) points. The points system worked as follows: 2 points for a win and 1 point for a draw.
(C) Champions

== Other national teams ==
=== Scottish League XI ===
Date	Venue	Opponents	Score (Note: Scottish League XI's score is shown first.)	Scotland scorer(s)
27 February 1904	St Mirren Park, Paisley (H)	(Northern Ireland) Irish League XI	3–1	Robert Hamilton (2), Bobby Walker
4 April 1904	Bank Street, Manchester (A)	(England) Football League XI	1–2	John Robertson

== See also ==
- 1903–04 Aberdeen F.C. season
- 1903–04 Rangers F.C. season
