= Bob Grieve (footballer) =

Scottish footballer

Personal information
- Full name: Robert Grieve
- Date of birth: 28 March 1884
- Place of birth: Greenock, Scotland
- Position: Inside forward

Senior career*
Years	Team	Apps	(Gls)
1901–1902	Greenock Volunteers		
1902–1906	Morton		
1906–1909	Manchester City	44	(18)
1909–1910	Accrington Stanley		
1910–1911	Leicester Fosse	4	(2)
1911	Accrington Stanley		
1911	Southport Central		
1912	Accrington Stanley		
1913	Crewe Alexandra		
1914	Witton Albion		
Total		48	(20)
- * Club domestic league appearances and goals

Robert Grieve (28 March 1884–unknown) was a Scottish footballer who played in the Football League for Leicester Fosse and Manchester City.
