= Ernest Harvey (footballer) =

English footballer

Personal information
- Full name: Ernest Alfred Harvey
- Date of birth: 1883
- Place of birth: Chesterfield, England
- Position: Right back

Senior career*
Years	Team	Apps	(Gls)
1906–1908	New Brompton	63	(1)
1908	Glossop	5	(0)
- Hyde
- * Club domestic league appearances and goals

Ernest Alfred Harvey was an English professional footballer who played as a right back in the Football League for Glossop.

== Career statistics ==
Appearances and goals by club, season and competition
Club	Season	League			FA Cup		Total	
Club	Season	Division	Apps	Goals	Apps	Goals	Apps	Goals
New Brompton	1906–07	Southern League First Division	34	0	4	0	38	0
New Brompton	1907–08	Southern League First Division	29	1	4	0	33	1
Career total			63	1	8	0	71	1
