= Harry Phillips (footballer, born 1877) =

English footballer (1877–1955)

Personal information
- Full name: Henry George Phillips
- Date of birth: 22 April 1877
- Place of birth: Caverswall, Staffordshire, England
- Date of death: 30 March 1955 (aged 77)
- Place of death: Forsbrook, Staffordshire, England
- Position: Forward

Senior career*
Years	Team	Apps	(Gls)
1898–1899	Sandford Hill F.C.		
1899–1900	Lincoln City	2	(1)
1900–1903	Stockton		
1903–1905	Grimsby Town	21	(9)
1905–1906	New Brompton	17	(1)
- * Club domestic league appearances and goals

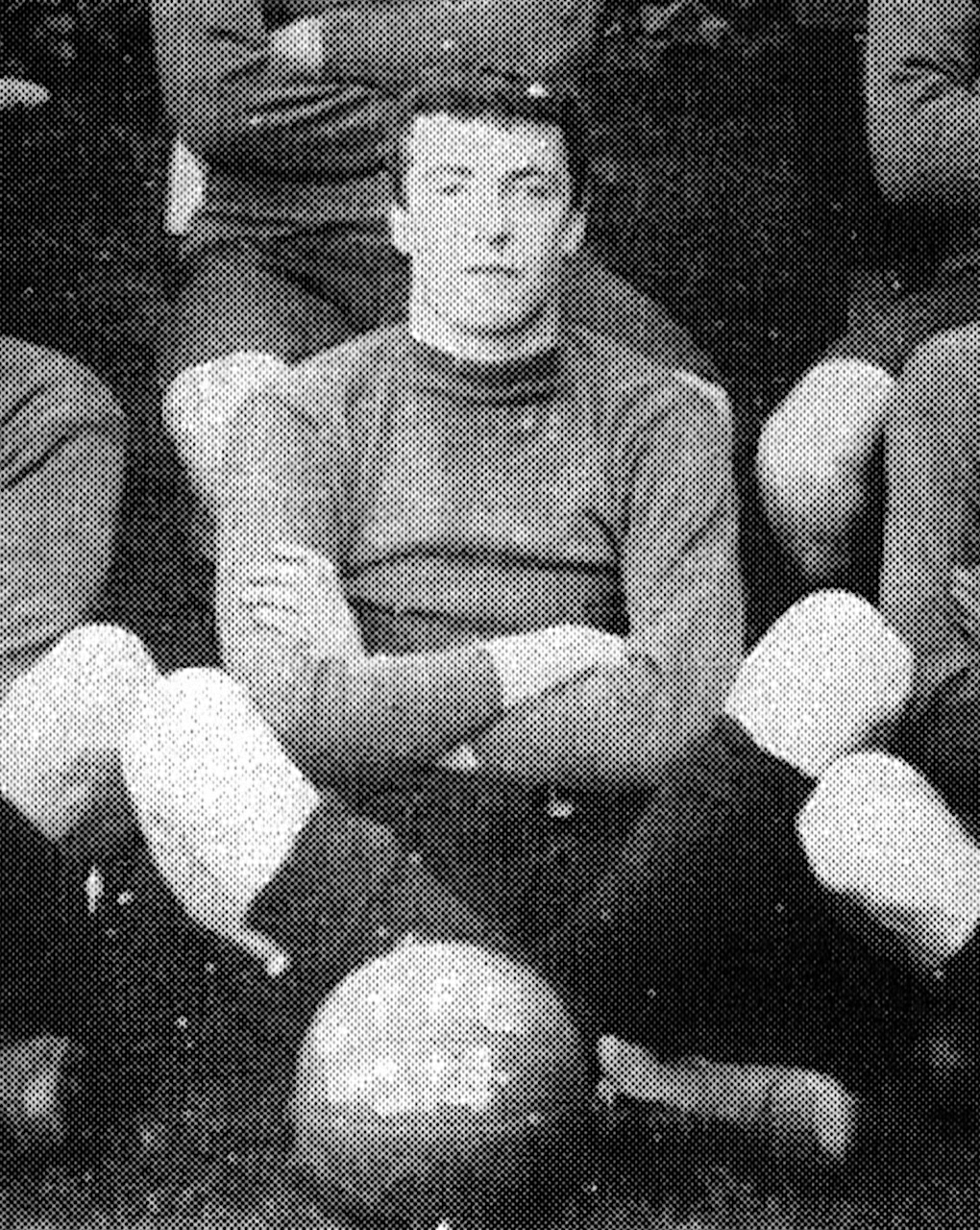
Harry Phillips, 1904

Henry George Phillips (born 1877) was an English professional footballer who played as a forward.

A prolific marksman in Stoke whilst an iron foundry worker, after a spell with Sandford Hill Phillips signed with Lincoln City with whom he scored on his league debut, the second goal in a 3–0 home win against Middlesbrough on the opening day of the 1899/1900 season.

He played for Stockton between 1900 and 1903 where he was part of the FA Amateur Cup winning team of 1902/03.

He was signed by Grimsby Town in 1903, scoring 9 goals in 21 appearances. He finished the 1904/05 season as joint top scorer with seven goals despite missing several games with a knee injury. As reported in the March 27 edition of The Athletic News during a game against Glossop, "Phillips scored the best goal of the day after a fine run half the length of the field" whilst deputising at Outside Left for his teammate, William Ross.

His form during the 1904/05 season drew an unsuccessful £150 bid from Middlesbrough, though at the season's end he was allowed to join New Brompton (later to become Gillingham FC) as a free agent.

He was a versatile attacker, making appearances across the front line over the course of his career, with the majority being at centre forward.

In "Mariner Men: Grimsby Town Who's Who 1892-2007" by Rob Briggs and Dave Wherry, Harry is likened in style to Joe Rogers, described as "a bustler, quick on the ball, one of the cleverest with his head".
