= Arthur Beadsworth =

English footballer

Personal information
- Full name: Arthur Beadsworth
- Date of birth: September 1876
- Place of birth: Leicester, England
- Date of death: 9 October 1917 (aged 41)
- Place of death: Wimereux, France
- Positions: Outside left; inside forward

Youth career
- 1893: Leicester Fosse
- Leicester YMCA

Senior career*
Years	Team	Apps	(Gls)
1898–1900	Hinckley United		
1900–1901	Leicester Fosse	4	(0)
- Coventry City
1902	Preston North End	0	(0)
1902–1903	Manchester United	9	(1)
1903–1905	Swindon Town	54	(11)
1905	Blackburn Rovers	0	(0)
1905–1906	New Brompton	21	(3)
1906	Burton United	18	(0)
- Hinckley United
1907–1908	Nuneaton Town		(7)
- Hinckley United
- * Club domestic league appearances and goals

Arthur Beadsworth (September 1876 – 9 October 1917) was an English professional football who played in the Football League for Burton United, Manchester United and Leicester Fosse as a forward.

== Personal life ==
Beadsworth briefly served in the Leicestershire Regiment and the King's Royal Rifle Corps of the British Army in the early 1890s, before being discharged for being underage. He married in 1897, had four children and later worked as a shoe hand in Hinckley after his retirement from professional football in 1906. After the outbreak of the First World War in August 1914, Beadsworth re-enlisted in the Leicestershire Regiment. His battalion was deployed to the Western Front in July 1915 and by March 1916 he had risen to the rank of sergeant. Beadsworth was gassed during the Third Battle of Ypres, and he was transferred to Wimereux, France, where he died of his wounds on 9 October 1917. He was buried in Wimereux Communal Cemetery.

== Career statistics ==
Appearances and goals by club, season and competition
Club	Season	League			FA Cup		Total	
Club	Season	Division	Apps	Goals	Apps	Goals	Apps	Goals
Leicester Fosse	1900–01	Second Division	4	0	0	0	4	0
Manchester United	1902–03	Second Division	9	1	3	1	12	2
Swindon Town	1903–04	Southern League First Division	24	3	0	0	24	3
Swindon Town	1904–05	Southern League First Division	30	8	0	0	30	8
Swindon Town	Total		54	11	0	0	54	11
New Brompton	1905–06	Southern League First Division	21	3	3	1	24	4
Burton United	1906–07	Second Division	18	0	0	0	18	0
Career total			106	15	6	2	112	17
