= Jack Hopkins =

English footballer

Personal information
- Place of birth: Liverpool, England
- Position: Winger

Senior career*
Years	Team	Apps	(Gls)
1902–1903	Liverpool	0	(0)
1904–1907	Wolverhampton Wanderers	43	(14)
1907–1908	New Brompton		
Total		43	(14)
- * Club domestic league appearances and goals

Jack Hopkins was an English footballer who played in the Football League for Wolverhampton Wanderers.
