= Jimmy Pass =

English footballer (1883–1956)

James Pass
Personal information
- Full name: James Ernest Pass
- Date of birth: 6 November 1883
- Place of birth: Jubbulpore, India
- Date of death: 2 November 1956 (aged 72)
- Place of death: Stockport, Lancashire
- Position(s): Forward

Senior career*
Years	Team	Apps	(Gls)
1903–1907	Stockport County	0	(0)
1907–1908	Tottenham Hotspur	18	(5)
1908–?	New Brompton	8	(1)
- *Club domestic league appearances and goals

James Ernest Pass (6 November 1883 – 2 November 1956) was a professional footballer who played for Stockport County, Tottenham Hotspur and New Brompton.

== Career ==
Pass was born in Jubbulpore, Madhya Pradesh, India, it was not known when he moved to England with his family, however his first recorded club was Stockport County in 1903. In May 1907 he joined Tottenham Hotspur; his debut was the Southern League away game against Queens Park Rangers which ended in a 3–3 draw. In early 1908, he joined fellow Southern League club New Brompton, making his debut against Portsmouth on 28 March. He played eight times, scoring one goal, before leaving the club at the end of the season.

== Works cited ==
- Brown, Tony (2003). The Definitive Gillingham F.C.: A Complete Record. Soccerdata. ISBN 978-1-8994-6820-1.
- Soar, Phil (1995). Tottenham Hotspur The Official Illustrated History 1882–1995. Hamlyn. ISBN 0-600-58706-1.
- Goodwin, Bob (1992). The Spurs Alphabet. ACL & Polar Publishing (UK) Ltd. ISBN 0-9514862-8-4.
