= Charlie McGibbon =

English footballer

Personal information
- Full name: Charles Edward McGibbon
- Date of birth: 21 April 1880
- Place of birth: Portsmouth, Hampshire, England
- Date of death: 2 May 1954 (aged 74)
- Place of death: Hamble-le-Rice, Hampshire, England
- Position: Centre forward

Senior career*
Years	Team	Apps	(Gls)
1905–1906	Woolwich Arsenal	0	(0)
1906–1907	Eltham	?	(?)
1907–1908	New Brompton	32	(14)
1908–1909	Crystal Palace	?	(?)
1909–1910	Southampton	28	(19)
1910	Woolwich Arsenal	4	(3)
1910–1911	Leyton	?	(?)
1911	Reading	?	(?)
1911	Southampton	0	(0)
- Cricket career
Cricket information
Domestic team information
- Years: Team
- 1919: Hampshire
Career statistics
Competition	First-class
Matches	1
Runs scored	1
Batting average	1.00
100s/50s	0/0
Top score	1*
Balls bowled	6
Wickets	0
Bowling average	–
5 wickets in innings	–
10 wickets in match	–
Best bowling	–
Catches/stumpings	0/–
- Source: , 5 October 2025
- * Club domestic league appearances and goals

Charles Edward McGibbon (21 April 1880 – 2 May 1954) was an English footballer who played for several teams, including Woolwich Arsenal and Southampton, on a part-time basis while serving with the Royal Garrison Artillery. He also played one first-class cricket match for Hampshire following the First World War.

== Football career ==
McGibbon was born in Portsmouth in April 1880, and joined the Royal Garrison Artillery, reaching the rank of sergeant. While serving at the Ordnance College of the Royal Garrison Artillery at Woolwich, he came to the attention of Woolwich Arsenal, whom he joined in August 1905. He failed to get into the first team and after a spell with Eltham, he joined New Brompton (now Gillingham) in 1907, who were playing in the Southern League under the management and captaincy of former England international Stephen Smith. In McGibbon's season at the club, New Brompton finished bottom of the table, avoiding relegation only due to the expansion of the league, but did achieve an FA Cup victory over First Division Sunderland, in which McGibbon scored a hat-trick. McGibbon had previously scored a hat-trick in the 6–0 victory over Shepherds Bush in the fifth qualifying round. In the first round match, played at Priestfield Stadium on 11 January 1908, Sunderland took the lead after half an hour from England international George Holley. New Brompton equalised immediately with a header from McGibbon, who followed up with two second-half goals to claim a 3–1 victory. In the second round, New Brompton came up against Manchester City, then third in the Football League First Division. McGibbon scored in the first match, which ended 1–1, and again in the replay (from a penalty) but was unable to prevent the Football League club from claiming a 2–1 victory. McGibbon ended the 1907–08 season as New Brompton's top scorer with 22 goals from all competitions.

McGibbon played for Southern League Crystal Palace in the 1908–09 season, scoring a hat-trick in a 4–4 draw with Southampton at The Dell on 5 October 1908. This brought him to the attention of the Southampton directors, and when McGibbon's military duties took him to Portsmouth, he joined Southampton in May 1909. Described as "physically well-suited for the role of centre-forward", McGibbon possessed a "powerful shot (and) influential leadership qualities". His opportunism in front of goal enabled him to score 19 goals in 28 league goals in the 1909–10 season, making him Southampton's top-scorer for the season.

In March 1910, his military duties took him back to Woolwich, and he immediately found a place in a struggling Woolwich Arsenal team that was fighting relegation. He made his debut away to Chelsea on 28 March 1910 and scored the only goal in a 1–0 win. He followed that up with the winner in a 1–0 victory over Aston Villa and the equaliser in a 1–1 draw with Tottenham Hotspur. His three goals from four appearances helped Arsenal avoid relegation from the Football League First Division, by a margin of two points above Chelsea. At the start of the following season, McGibbon moved on to join Leyton, where he broke his right leg on Boxing Day in 1910. After a spell at Reading, McGibbon returned to Southampton in November 1911, but failed to get back into the first team, having been found guilty by The FA of taking illegal payments while playing at Leyton as an amateur.

== World War I and later life ==
McGibbon served in the First World War as a clerk with the Royal Garrison Artillery. He saw active service on the Western Front, where he captained a Royal Artillery football team which played the Royal Engineers at the front on Christmas of 1914. After the war, he found employment as the chief clerk for the Royal Army Medical Corps in the Statistical Office at Netley Hospital and later worked for Supermarine at Woolston, where he became manager of the Supermarine Sports Club.

McGibbon played first-class cricket for Hampshire in July 1919, a heavy innings defeat against Yorkshire at Dewsbury in the County Championship. Batting twice in the match, he was dismissed from the middle order without scoring in Hampshire's first innings by Billy Williams, while following-on in their second innings, he batted at number eleven and was unbeaten with a single run. In Yorkshire's only innings, he bowled one over which conceded 10 runs.

In later life, he played billiards and in 1933, 1934 and 1936 he was British Legion South Eastern area billiards champion. He also represented Netley and Hampshire, reaching the national semi-finals in 1936. McGibbon died in April 1954 at Hamble-le-Rice, Hampshire. His son, Douglas (1919–2002), played football for Southampton from 1938 to 1947, as well as for Fulham and Bournemouth & Boscombe Athletic.
