= Walter Leigh (footballer) =

English footballer

Walter Herbert Leigh (November 1874 – 1938) was an English footballer active at the turn of the 20th century. He made a total of 119 appearances in The Football League for Aston Villa, Grimsby Town, Bristol City and Clapton Orient.
