= Enoch Lunn =

English footballer

Personal information
- Full name: Enoch Lunn
- Date of birth: 7 December 1885
- Place of birth: Barnsley, Yorkshire
- Date of death: 17 March 1961 (aged 75)
- Place of death: Sheffield, Yorkshire
- Position: Inside forward

Senior career*
Years	Team	Apps	(Gls)
- Clowne White Star
1905–1906	Chesterfield Town	24	(3)
1906–1907	New Brompton	23	(0)
- * Club domestic league appearances and goals

Enoch Lunn (7 December 1885 – 17 March 1961) was an English professional association footballer of the early twentieth century.

He joined Chesterfield Town in 1905 from a minor team in nearby Clowne and made 24 appearances in The Football League, scoring three goals. In 1906 he joined New Brompton of the Southern League, where he played for one season. He was a regular starter for the Kent-based club in the second half of the 1906–07 season, before signing with Mexborough Athletic in Yorkshire.
