= Harry Robotham =

English footballer (1879–1916)

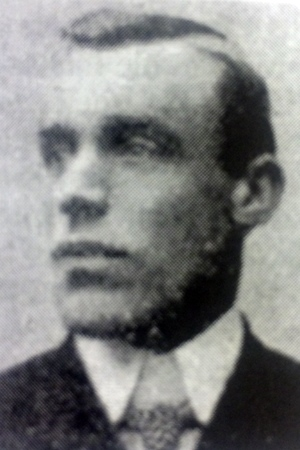
- Robotham while with Fulham in 1905

Personal information
- Full name: Horace Osborne Robotham
- Date of birth: 12 June 1879
- Place of birth: Heath Town, England
- Date of death: 12 September 1916 (aged 37)
- Place of death: Flers-Courcelette, France
- Position: Right half

Senior career*
Years	Team	Apps	(Gls)
- Wolverhampton Post Office
- Redshaw Albion
1899	Ossett		
1899–1901	Hunslet		
1901–1902	Wolverhampton Wanderers	7	(1)
1903–1905	Fulham	34	(0)
1905–1906	Brentford	18	(0)
1906–1907	Glossop	23	(4)
1907–1908	New Brompton	30	(0)
1908–1909	Wellington Town		
- * Club domestic league appearances and goals

Horace Osborne Robotham (12 June 1879 – 12 September 1916) was an English professional footballer who played in the Football League for Glossop and Wolverhampton Wanderers as a right half. He also played in the Southern League for Fulham, New Brompton and Brentford.

== Personal life ==
On 26 November 1915, in Wolverhampton during the First World War, Robotham enlisted in the 2nd Football Battalion of the Middlesex Regiment. He served his initial time on the Western Front between Hazebrouck and Bailleul in 1916 and later took part in the Battle of the Somme. Robotham was killed on 12 September 1916 during the Battle of Flers-Courcelette. His body was never recovered and his name is recorded on the Thiepval Memorial to the Missing of the Somme.

== Career statistics ==
Appearances and goals by club, season and competition
Club	Season	League			FA Cup		Total	
Club	Season	Division	Apps	Goals	Apps	Goals	Apps	Goals
Wolverhampton Wanderers	1901–02	First Division	6	1	0	0	6	1
Wolverhampton Wanderers	1902–03	First Division	1	0	0	0	1	0
Wolverhampton Wanderers	Total		7	1	0	0	7	1
Brentford	1905–06	Southern League First Division	18	0	3	0	21	0
New Brompton	1907–08	Southern League First Division	30	0	3	0	33	0
Career total			55	1	6	0	61	1
