= Tom Paton (footballer) =

Scottish footballer

Personal information
- Full name: Thomas Henry Paton
- Date of birth: 8 November 1881
- Place of birth: East Kilbride, Scotland
- Date of death: 1922 (aged 40–41)
- Place of death: Greenock, Scotland
- Position: Full back

Senior career*
Years	Team	Apps	(Gls)
1900–1901	Larkhall Thistle		
1901–1902	Hamilton Academical	2	(0)
1902–1903	Royal Albert		
1903–1904	Rangers	2	(0)
1904	→ Vale of Leven (loan)		
1904–1906	Derby County	34	(4)
1906–1907	Sheffield United	21	(5)
1907–1912	St Mirren	80	(16)
1912–1914	Airdrieonians	69	(4)
1914–1917	St Johnstone		
1917–1918	Cowdenbeath	28	(1)
1918	Stevenston United		
Total		283	(29)
- * Club domestic league appearances and goals

Thomas Henry Paton (8 November 1881 – 1922) was a Scottish footballer who played in the Football League for Derby County and Sheffield United.
