= Billy Lee (English footballer) =

English footballer

Personal information
- Full name: William Lee
- Date of birth: 12 August 1878
- Place of birth: West Bromwich, England
- Date of death: 5 November 1934 (aged 56)
- Place of death: Walsall, England
- Position: Centre forward

Senior career*
Years	Team	Apps	(Gls)
- West Bromwich Baptists
- West Bromwich Standard
- Bournville Athletic
1901–1904	West Bromwich Albion	71	(25)
1903	→ Bournemouth Wanderers (loan)		
1904–1906	Portsmouth		
1906–1907	New Brompton		
1907–1908	Chesterfield Town	26	(6)
1908–1911	Darlaston		
- * Club domestic league appearances and goals

William Lee (12 August 1878 – 5 November 1934) was an English footballer who played as a centre forward. He played in the Football League for West Bromwich Albion and Chesterfield Town.

== Biography ==
Lee was born in West Bromwich. He turned professional with West Bromwich Albion in September 1901. In 1903 he joined Bournemouth Wanderers on loan. He signed for Portsmouth in September 1904 for a £100 fee. In August 1906 he moved to New Brompton for £50, and a year later joined Chesterfield Town for the same fee. He joined Darlaston on a free transfer in October 1908 and retired due to injury in May 1911. He died in Walsall in 1934.
