= Joe Walton (footballer, born 1882) =

English footballer (1882–1954)

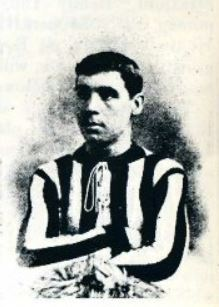
- Walton pictured in New Brompton colours c. 1906

Personal information
- Full name: Joseph Walton
- Date of birth: 12 June 1882
- Place of birth: North Shields, England
- Date of death: March 1954 (aged 71)
- Place of death: North Shields, England
- Height: 5 ft 9 in (1.75 m)
- Position: Full back

Youth career
- –1900: North Shields Athletic

Senior career*
Years	Team	Apps	(Gls)
1900–1901	North Shields Athletic		
1901–1902	Wallsend Park Villa		
1902–1904	The Wednesday	0	(0)
1904–1906	New Brompton	62	(0)
1906–1911	Chelsea	53	(0)
1911–1919	Barry		
1919–1920	Swansea Town	7	(0)
1920–19??	Bridgend Town		
- * Club domestic league appearances and goals

Joseph Walton (12 June 1882 – March 1954) was an English professional footballer who played in the Football League for Chelsea in the early twentieth century. A full back, he was on the books of The Wednesday without appearing for their first team, played Southern League football for New Brompton, Barry, Swansea Town and Bridgend Town, and began his career in non-league football with North Shields Athletic and Wallsend Park Villa.

== Life and career ==
Walton was born in North Shields, Northumberland, in 1882, a son of Joseph Walton, a steamboatman, and his wife Isabella. The 1901 Census records the 18-year-old Walton working as a coppersmith in the shipyards.

Walton played football for Northern Combination club North Shields Athletic, and was brought into their first team in late 1900, which according to the local newspaper was not before time. He performed well, and at the end of the season moved on to Wallsend Park Villa of the Northern Alliance. He continued to improve – originally a left-sided player, he developed the ability to play equally well on the right, and within six months he signed for Football League First Division club Sheffield Wednesday. He was the first North Shields player to join a Football League club, and the fee was reported as "a figure which [would] substantially benefit" the Wallsend club.

He never broke through to Wednesday's first team, and in the 1904 close season he signed for New Brompton of the Southern League. He made his debut on 10 September in a 3–1 win away to Wellingborough, and continued as a regular for the next two seasons, appearing in all but six of New Brompton's matches in league and FA Cup.

His performances with New Brompton earned him a move to Chelsea, who had joined the Football League a year earlier and were reportedly "glad to pay £200 to secure his transfer". By now primarily a right back, Walton went straight into Chelsea's league team and continued in the side until a bout of influenza in at the turn of the year deprived him of three league appearances. On his return, he was ever-present as Chelsea won the Second Division title. Walton's part in Chelsea's first top-flight campaign lasted just 25 minutes: facing Sheffield United at Stamford Bridge in the opening fixture, he broke both tibia and fibula of his left leg in collision with an opponent. He recovered enough to play for the reserves at the end of the season, but did not find his way back into the first team until the following February and unsurprisingly took time to regain form and confidence. He then went on a run of seven matches at left back that took him to twelve appearances for the season, and played at right back in the first five matches of the 1909–10 season, but those were his last. He surfaced from time to time with Chelsea's junior teams: he was selected for the South Eastern League fixture against Clapton Orient in March 1910, and in a London League match in April 1911, he "reappeared at right back for Chelsea [Reserves] after a long absence owing to injuries".

Walton played briefly for Barry in the 1911–12 season, and was a regular in their 1913–14 Southern League side. When competitive football resumed in 1919 after the First World War, he signed for Swansea Town, then a Southern League club, "being able to make better terms than at Barry." After one season, he moved on to Bridgend Town, newly admitted to the Southern League.

The 1939 Register records Walton having returned to his trade as a shipyard coppersmith, living in Tynemouth, Northumberland, with his wife, Janet née Crombie. He later moved back to North Shields, where he died in March 1954 at the age of 71.
