= Bill Marriott (footballer) =

English footballer

William Marriott (1880–1944) was an English footballer active in the early twentieth century. He played 8 times in The Football League for Aston Villa between 1901 and 1902, and also played for Bristol Rovers, Northampton Town, and New Brompton, where he made 83 league and FA Cup appearances.
