= Jimmy Hartley =

Scottish footballer

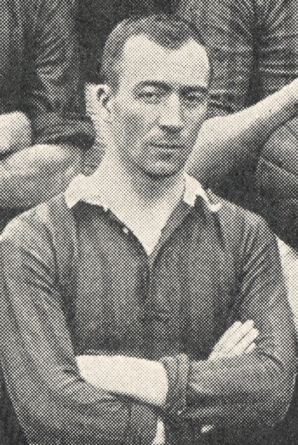
- Hartley while with Brentford in 1905.

Personal information
- Full name: James Milburn Hartley
- Date of birth: 29 October 1876
- Place of birth: Dumbarton, Scotland
- Date of death: 12 November 1913 (aged 37)
- Place of death: Dumbarton, Scotland
- Height: 5 ft 6 in (1.68 m)
- Position: Inside forward

Senior career*
Years	Team	Apps	(Gls)
1894–1895	Dumbarton	14	(5)
1895–1896	Sunderland	10	(1)
1896–1897	Burnley	1	(0)
1897	→ Lincoln City (loan)	9	(5)
1897–1899	Tottenham Hotspur	17	(8)
1899–1903	Lincoln City	129	(47)
1903–1905	Rangers	4	(0)
1904–1905	→ Port Glasgow Athletic (loan)	23	(11)
1905–1906	Brentford	23	(5)
1906–1908	New Brompton	33	(14)
1908–1910	Port Glasgow Athletic		
- * Club domestic league appearances and goals

James Milburn Hartley (29 October 1876 – 12 November 1913) was a Scottish professional footballer who played as an inside forward, most notably in the Football League for Lincoln City.

== Career statistics ==
Appearances and goals by club, season and competition
Club	Season	League			National cup (Note: Includes Scottish Cup, FA Cup)		Total	
Club	Season	Division	Apps	Goals	Apps	Goals	Apps	Goals
Dumbarton	1894–95	Scottish League First Division	7	1	0	0	8	1
Dumbarton	1895–96	Scottish League First Division	7	4	1	0	7	4
Dumbarton	Total		14	5	1	0	15	5
Sunderland	1895–96	First Division	5	0	0	0	5	0
Sunderland	1896–97	First Division	6	1	0	0	6	1
Sunderland	Total		11	1	0	0	11	1
Burnley	1896–97	First Division	1	0	0	0	1	0
Tottenham Hotspur	1897–98	Southern League First Division	15	7	1	0	16	7
Tottenham Hotspur	1898–99	Southern League First Division	2	1	2	1	4	2
Tottenham Hotspur	Total		17	8	3	1	20	9
Rangers	1903–04	Scottish First Division	4	0	0	0	4	0
Port Glasgow Athletic (loan)	1904–05	Scottish First Division	23	11	1	1	24	12
Brentford	1905–06	Southern League First Division	23	5	3	1	26	6
New Brompton	1906–07	Southern League First Division	19	10	2	1	21	11
New Brompton	1907–08	Southern League First Division	14	4	1	0	15	4
New Brompton	Total		33	14	3	1	36	15
Career total			126	44	11	4	137	48
