= Dan Cunliffe =

English footballer (1875–1937)

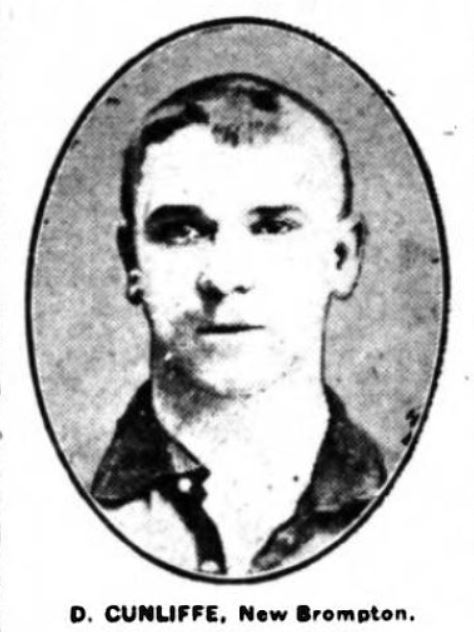
- Cunliffe pictured in 1906

Personal information
- Full name: Daniel Cunliffe
- Date of birth: 11 June 1875
- Place of birth: Bolton, England
- Date of death: 28 December 1937 (aged 62)
- Position: Inside forward

Youth career
- Little Lever
- Middleton Borough
- Oldham County

Senior career*
Years	Team	Apps	(Gls)
1897–1898	Liverpool	14	(5)
1898–1899	New Brighton Tower	30	(15)
1899–1900	Portsmouth		
1900–1901	New Brighton Tower	28	(9)
1901–1906	Portsmouth		
1906–1907	New Brompton	36	(15)
1907–1909	Millwall Athletic		
1909–1912	Heywood		
1912–1914	Rochdale		

International career
1900	England	1	(0)
- * Club domestic league appearances and goals

Daniel Cunliffe (11 June 1875 – 28 December 1937) was an English footballer who had a rather nomadic career in which he played as an inside forward for several clubs, including Liverpool as well as making one appearance for England in 1900.

== Career ==
Cunliffe was born in Bolton and played for several Lancashire clubs, including Little Lever, Middleton Borough and Oldham County before joining First Division Liverpool in 1897.

He made 14 First Division appearances for Liverpool during the 1897–98 season, scoring five times, including two against Stoke at Anfield on 9 October 1897. Numerous changes were made to the club's forward-line during that season and Cunliffe only featured three times during the second half of the season. He also played in four FA Cup ties for Liverpool, scoring the winner in their 2–1 second round replay with Newton Heath on 16 February 1898.

Cunliffe spent the 1898–99 season with New Brighton Tower in the Second Division. He made thirty league appearances, scoring 15 goals in a forward line which included former England international Alf Milward.

In the summer of 1899, he joined Portsmouth who had been founded a year earlier and were elected as members of an expanded Southern League for the 1899–1900 season. Cunliffe made his Fratton Park debut on 6 September 1899 in a friendly match against local rivals Southampton, when he scored the opening goal in a 2–0 victory. Cunliffe scored again in the first Southern League derby match against Southampton at The Dell on 14 April 1900 as Pompey ended their inaugural professional season as runners-up. He also scored Portsmouth's first goal in the FA Cup proper in a 1–1 draw with Blackburn Rovers on 1 February 1900; Portsmouth lost the replay 5–0.

Cunliffe's form earned him selection for England against Ireland in 1900. For the match, played at Lansdowne Road, Dublin on 17 March 1900, the England team were confidently expecting an easy match after five successive victories, including winning 13–2 the previous year. The England selectors chose five debutantes, including Cunliffe, who made his solitary England appearance at inside right, with his Portsmouth teammate Matt Reilly in goal for the Irish. In the event, the game was far more difficult than expected, with England only managing a 2–0 victory, with goals from Charlie Sagar and Harry Johnson, who were also both making their international debut.

For the next season, Cunliffe returned to New Brighton Tower, where he made a further 28 league appearances with nine goals. He scored all three goals in an FA Cup intermediate round match at Port Vale on 5 January 1901. Despite finishing fourth in the league, the cost of maintaining a professional football club became too high for the tower's owners, and the club was disbanded in the summer of 1901.

Following the folding of the New Tower club, Cunliffe returned to Portsmouth for the 1901–02 season, in which he helped the south coast team take the Southern League title for the first time, by a margin of five points over Tottenham Hotspur, as well as retaining their Western League title.

Cunliffe remained at Portsmouth until May 1906, when he signed for New Brompton. He spent one season with the Kent-based club, finishing as top scorer with 15 goals, before moving on. He later played for Millwall Athletic and Heywood before finishing his career at Rochdale in 1914.

== Honours ==
Portsmouth

- Southern League champions: 1901–02
