= Joe Elliott (footballer) =

English footballer

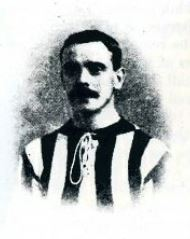

Personal information
- Full name: Joseph Elliott
- Position: Half-back

Senior career*
Years	Team	Apps	(Gls)
1898–1902	Preston North End	80	(4)
1902–1907	New Brompton	134	(2)
- * Club domestic league appearances and goals

Joseph Elliott was a footballer active in England in the late nineteenth and early twentieth centuries.

A half-back, Elliott made 80 appearances in The Football League for Preston North End between 1989 and 1902, scoring four goals. He then moved to New Brompton of the Southern League, making his debut against Luton Town on 13 September 1902. Over the next four seasons he missed only three league games. During the 1906–07 season he played only occasionally, however, and he left the club in 1907, finishing with a total of 134 Southern League appearances and two goals.
