= William Ironside Groombridge =

English football manager and secretary

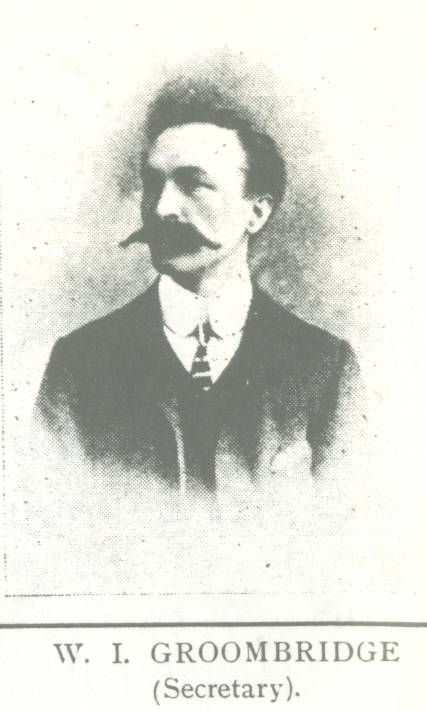
William Ironside Groombridge

William Ironside Groombridge (17 November 1875 – 24 September 1943) was secretary of the English football club Gillingham (known for much of his tenure as New Brompton) from 1897 until 1923. Although the roles were not as clearly defined in the pre-war era, he is regarded as having carried out the responsibilities of manager from 1896 until 1906, from 1908 until 1919, and from 1922 until 1923. His uncle, Thomas Saxton, was landlord of the Napier Arms pub where the club was formed in 1893.
