= George Lloyd (1900s footballer) =

English footballer

Personal information
- Full name: George Henry Lloyd
- Place of birth: Derby, England
- Position: Half-back

Senior career*
Years	Team	Apps	(Gls)
1901–1903	Derby County	10	(1)
1903–1908	New Brompton	136	(0)
- * Club domestic league appearances and goals

George Henry Lloyd was an English professional footballer of the early twentieth century.

Born in Derby, he began his professional career with local club Derby County, making ten appearances in The Football League. In 1903 he joined New Brompton of the Southern League, where he played for the next five seasons. He made nearly 150 appearances for the Kent-based club.
