= Bill Floyd =

English footballer

William Bertram Floyd (born 1885) was an English footballer. Born in Frodingham, Lincolnshire, he played 97 times in the Football League for Gainsborough Trinity in two separate spells between 1904 and 1912. He also had a lengthy stint with New Brompton of the Southern League, where he made 99 appearances in league and FA Cup matches.
