= Fred Mavin =

English footballer (1884–1957)

Mavin pictured on a cigarette card issued in 1912

Frederick J. Mavin (listed in some sources as Fred Maven, 1884–1957) was an English professional footballer and manager. He began his career at Newcastle United, but did not make a first team appearance. In 1905 he signed for New Brompton. He subsequently played for Fulham, Bradford Park Avenue and Reading between 1909 and 1921, and managed Exeter City from 1923 to 1927, Crystal Palace from 1927 to 1930 and Gillingham from 1932 to 1937.
