= Steve Smith (footballer, born 1874) =

English footballer (1874-1935)

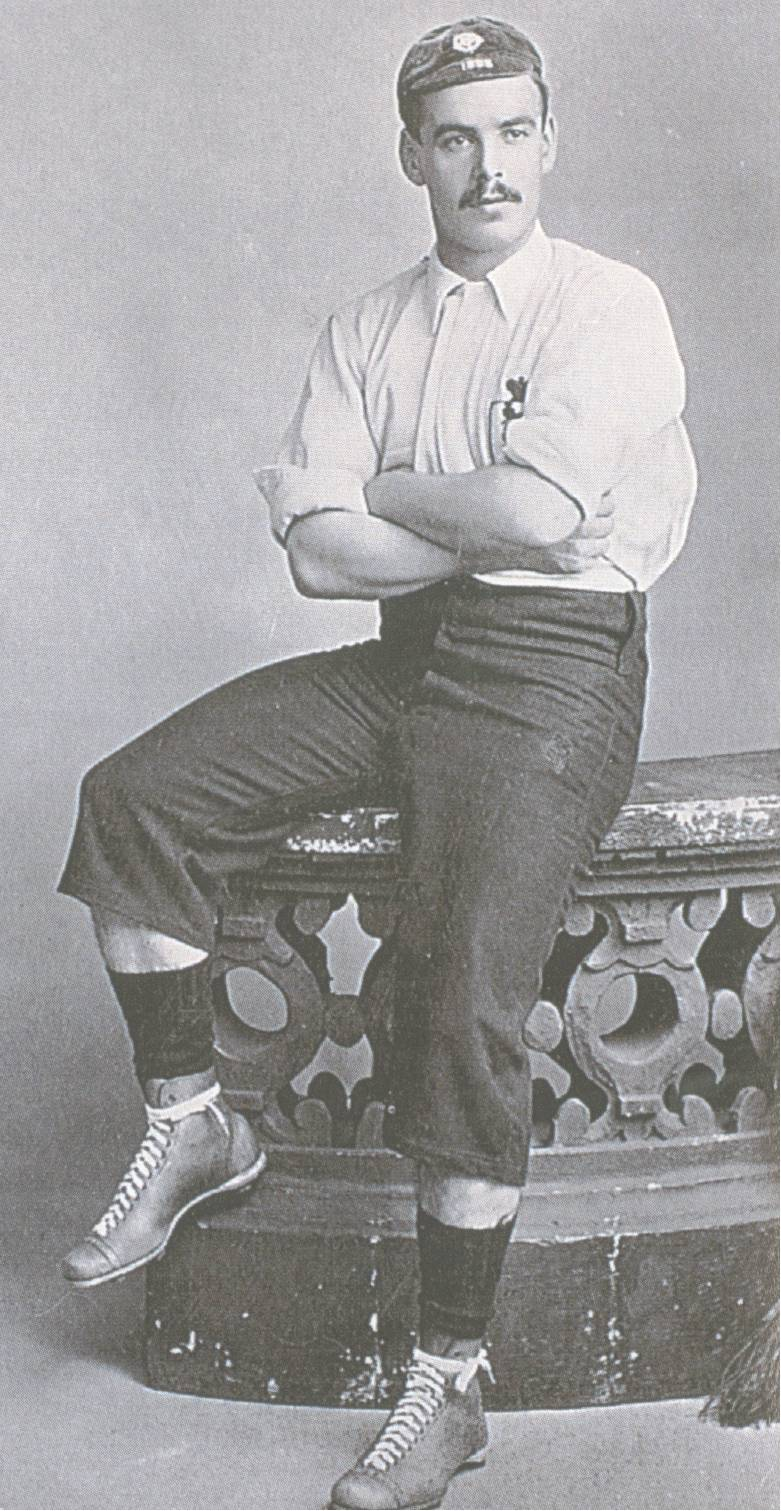

Personal information
- Full name: Stephen Smith
- Date of birth: 14 January 1874
- Place of birth: Abbots Bromley, England
- Date of death: 19 May 1935 (aged 61)
- Position: Outside left

Youth career
- Cannock Town
- Rugeley

Senior career*
Years	Team	Apps	(Gls)
- Hednesford Town
1893–1901	Aston Villa	162	(35)
1901–1906	Portsmouth		
1906–1908	New Brompton	71	(5)

International career
1895	England	1	(1)

Managerial career
- 1906–1908: New Brompton
- * Club domestic league appearances and goals

Stephen Smith (14 January 1874 – 19 May 1935) was an England international footballer in the late 19th century. Smith was born in Abbots Bromley, Staffordshire.

== Playing career ==
Steve Smith played for Aston Villa from 1893 to 1901, helping them to win the Football League title in 1893–94, 1895–96, 1896–97, 1898–99 and 1899–1900, as well as the 1895 FA Cup Final. Although Villa also won the cup in 1897 (thereby taking the "double"), Smith was not selected to play in the final although he made four appearances in the earlier rounds. He made one England appearance against Scotland in 1895.

In 1901 he moved south to join Southern League club Portsmouth, helping them to regain the Southern League championship at the end of his first season.

== Management career ==
In 1906 he was appointed to the role of player-manager of another Southern League club, New Brompton, a position he held until 1908.

== Quotes ==
One of the most effective players on the left wing since the time of Hodgetts. A particularly close dribbler, with a fine turn of speed, he was only robbed of the ball with difficulty, and with anything approaching a chance would centre most accurately. Being on the small side, he often suffered from the lungeous opponent, and while with the Villa received more than his share of hard knocks. Quiet and unassuming, he proved a most unselfish partner, and could always be relied upon to do his utmost. A modest winner and a good loser.

The Villa News and Record, 1 Sept. 1906

== Honours ==
Aston Villa

- Football League champions: 1893–94, 1895–96, 1896–97, 1898–99, 1899–1900
- FA Cup winners: 1895
