= 1913–14 Gillingham F.C. season =

English football club season

Gillingham
1913–14 season
- Chairman: Edward Crawley
- Manager: Sam Gilligan
- Southern League Division One: 13th
- FA Cup: Second round
- Top goalscorer: League: Charlie Hafekost (10); All: Charlie Hafekost (10)
- Highest home attendance: 12,000 vs Swindon Town (1 November 1913)
- Lowest home attendance: 5,000 (five matches)
Home colours

During the 1913–14 English football season, Gillingham F.C. competed in the Southern League Division One. It was the 20th season in which the club competed in the Southern League and the 19th in Division One. At the start of the season, the club appointed Sam Gilligan as player-manager. Gillingham's performances during the first half of the season were mixed and at the end of 1913 they were 12th out of 20 teams in the league table. They were undefeated in January and rose to 7th in the table, but then had a winless run of five games, including the team's heaviest defeat of the season. Gillingham won only one of their final seven games of the campaign and finished in 13th position, an improvement of two places on the previous season.

Gillingham also competed in the FA Cup. After victories in two qualifying rounds and the first round proper, they played Liverpool of the Football League First Division in the second round; the attendance of 42,045 was the largest recorded crowd in front of which Gillingham had ever played, home or away. Gillingham held their opponents for over 75 minutes but conceded two late goals and lost the game. The team played 42 competitive matches, winning 16, drawing 9, and losing 17. Charlie Hafekost was the team's top goalscorer, with 10 goals. Tom Leslie and Jack Mahon made the most appearances, both playing in every one of the team's 42 competitive matches. The highest attendance recorded at the club's home ground, Priestfield Road, was 12,000 for a game against Swindon Town, the eventual Southern League champions.

== Background and pre-season ==
Sam Gilligan was the club's new player-manager.

Gillingham, founded in 1893 under the name New Brompton, had played in the Southern League since the competition's formation in 1894, gaining promotion from Division Two at the first attempt in 1895 and remaining in Division One ever since, albeit with little success. The team had only finished in the top half of the league table once in the preceding eight seasons. In the 1912–13 season, the first in which the team competed under the name Gillingham, they had finished 15th out of 20 teams, avoiding relegation to Division Two by four places. At the time, the majority of clubs in the two divisions of the ostensibly national Football League were from the northern half of the country, and some of the leading clubs from the south played in the Southern League. In 1920, the clubs in the Southern League's top division would be admitted to the Football League en masse to form its new Third Division.

Prior to the season, Gillingham opted to employ a team manager for the first time since 1908, appointing Sam Gilligan, a forward who had last played for Liverpool, as player-manager. As was the norm at the time, Gilligan was responsible for team selection, discipline, and tactics, but other tasks associated with a modern manager, such as the signing of new players, remained among the responsibilities of the club's secretary, William Ironside Groombridge. Gillingham also signed another forward, Ernie Pinkney, who had played for Barrow of the Lancashire Combination during the previous season. The signing of two new forwards followed a season in which no player had scored more than five league goals for Gillingham and the team had finished the campaign as the lowest-scoring side in the division.

== Southern League Division One ==
=== September–December ===
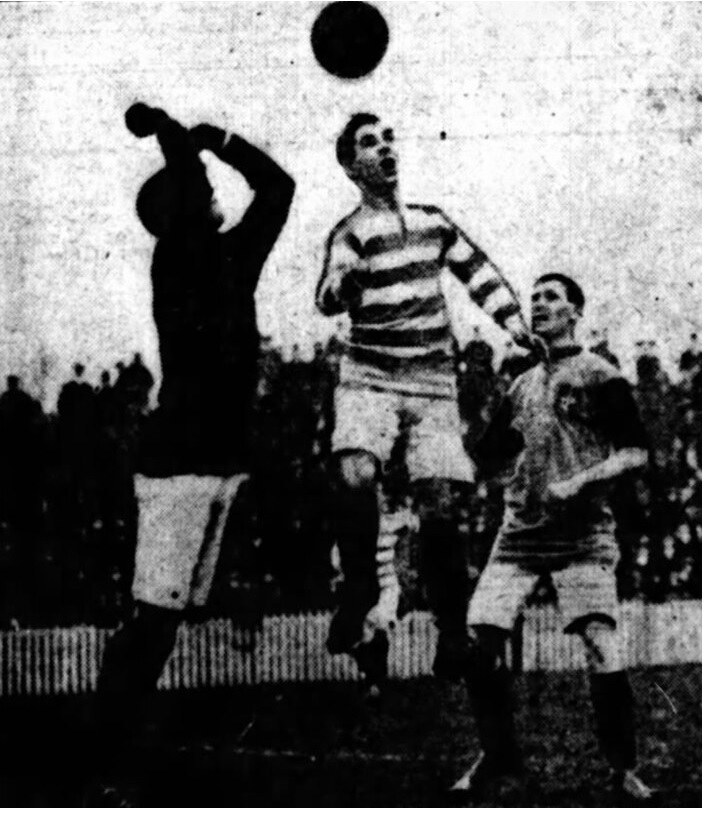
Gillingham's goalkeeper Albert Bailey defending against a Queens Park Rangers attack during the match on 27 December

Gillingham began the season with a game at their own ground, Priestfield Road, against Coventry City; Gilligan and Pinkney both made their debuts. Coventry scored a goal after just two minutes and added another in the second half of the game to win 2–0. Three days later, Gillingham secured their first win of the season when a goal from Gilligan gave them a 1–0 win at home to Queens Park Rangers. He scored again on 11 September in a 3–2 victory away to Coventry; Pinkney scored his first goal for the club in the game. Gillingham lost away to Northampton Town on 13 September but then won two consecutive games, scoring four goals in each. On 20 September, they beat Southend United 4–2 at Priestfield Road; Bill Pepper replaced Albert Bailey, the team's regular goalkeeper, after the latter was taken ill. It was the only game Bailey missed all season and the only match Pepper played for Gillingham. Four days later, the team won 4–0 at home to the previous season's Southern League champions, Plymouth Argyle. After scoring eight goals in two matches, however, they then scored none at all in the next three. Gillingham ended September with a 2–0 defeat away to Brighton & Hove Albion, in which the referee had to warn the players about their conduct after several heated incidents.

The team began October with a second consecutive defeat, losing 1–0 at home to Portsmouth due to a goal scored in the final five minutes of the game, and were then held to a goalless draw by Millwall, who had yet to win a match during the season. Gilligan ended the team's scoreless run against Exeter City on 18 October and Peter Glen added a second goal to secure a 2–0 victory. A week later, the team lost 2–0 away to Cardiff City; the Gillingham party had had to charter a special train to reach Cardiff in time after missing their connection in the aftermath of a fatal accident at Waterloo Junction station. On 1 November, Gillingham hosted Swindon Town, who had won every one of their first nine games; the visit of the league leaders attracted an attendance of 12,000, the largest of the season at Priestfield Road. Glen scored twice to give Gillingham a 2–1 lead at half-time, but their opponents scored two goals after the interval to secure a tenth consecutive victory. Although Gillingham had been defeated, the reporter for The Daily Telegraph wrote that they had "fully upheld their reputation as particularly dangerous opponents on their own ground" and that there had been "little, if anything, to choose between two thoroughly efficient sides". A week later Gillingham were defeated for the third consecutive game, losing 3–1 to Bristol Rovers, a result which left them 11th in the table.

Gillingham beat Merthyr Town 2–1 at Priestfield Road on 15 November, but then lost their next three league games. Dick Goffin, who had been a regular in the team during the previous season but had not featured at all in the current campaign, played on 22 November in place of Pinkney. Gillingham lost the match 3–1 to West Ham United; the writer for The Daily Telegraph said that Bailey "saved Gillingham from a heavier reverse". Pinkney returned to the forward line against Southampton on 6 December, a game which Gillingham also lost 3–1, but was absent again for the next league game away to Crystal Palace; John Tatton made his debut in his place. Gillingham lost the game 1–0; they had to play much of the second half with only ten men after Glen was injured.^{[a]} Their final three games of 1913 took place on consecutive days. On Christmas Day, two goals from Charlie Hafekost gave Gillingham a 2–0 victory away to Watford. The teams played again the following day at Priestfield Road; Hafekost scored again and Glen and Goffin added a goal each in a 3–0 win. Bailey kept a third consecutive clean sheet as Gillingham secured a 0–0 draw away to Queens Park Rangers in their final match of the calendar year, after which they were 12th in the league table.

=== January–April ===
Ernie Pinkney scored six goals in the second half of the season.

Gillingham's first game of 1914 resulted in a 1–1 draw at home to Northampton Town; Pinkney scored Gillingham's goal in the final five minutes of the game. He scored again in the next league match, as Gillingham beat Southend United after having been 2–0 down; Glen scored in the last minute of the match to make the final score 3–2. A week later, the team extended their unbeaten run to six games with a 4–0 victory at home to Brighton & Hove Albion, the first time they had scored as many goals in a game for four months. Hafekost scored two goals to take his total for the season so far to eight and Jack Mahon scored his first goal for more than 50 matches and only his third in nearly six seasons with the club. At the end of January, Gillingham were seventh in the league table. The team's first two games of February both resulted in draws, 0–0 away to Portsmouth and 2–2 at home to Millwall. Sidney Weavers replaced the injured Glen in the latter game, only his second appearance of the season, and scored a goal, but after the following week's game away to Exeter City Glen returned to the team and Weavers did not feature again during the campaign. Gillingham lost 2–0 to Exeter, ending an unbeaten league run of eight games.

A goalless draw at home to Cardiff City on 28 February meant that Gillingham had not won any matches during the month, and as a result had slipped back to 11th in the table. They began March with a game away to Swindon Town, who were top of the league table. Swindon took a 2–0 lead early in the game and, although Hafekost scored a goal to reduce the deficit going into the half-time interval, Swindon added three more goals in the second half to win 5–1. It was the first time Gillingham had conceded more than four goals in a game since January 1912. On 14 March, the team ended a five-game winless run and secured their first victory since January, defeating Bristol Rovers 3–0 at home with goals from Tom Leslie, Pinkney and Goffin, the latter of whom had been restored to the team against Swindon after being absent for more than two months. The team's form remained inconsistent: they lost 2–0 away to Merthyr Town, who were bottom of the table, on 21 March, but a week later beat fifth-placed West Ham United 3–1. Gilligan replaced Hafekost in the latter game and scored twice, his first goals for more than two months.

Gillingham began the final month of the season with three games in which they failed to score any goals. On 1 April they drew 0–0 with Reading at home; three days later they lost 1–0 away to Plymouth Argyle. Despite the return of Hafekost, the team's leading goalscorer of the season so far, Gillingham again failed to score against Norwich City on 10 April; the game ended in another 0–0 draw. Pinkney ended the team's scoreless run the next day against Southampton; he scored twice in a 3–1 victory. The team again failed to score in their next two matches and lost both. Gillingham's final game of the season was at home to Crystal Palace, who had the chance to win the league championship. Charles Fotheringham scored for Gillingham in the first half and, although Crystal Palace scored after the interval, Gillingham secured a draw. The result, combined with Swindon Town drawing with Cardiff City, meant that Crystal Palace and Swindon finished the season level on points and Swindon won the championship on goal average. Gillingham finished the campaign in 13th place.

=== League match details ===
Key

- In the result column, Gillingham's score is shown first
- H = Home match
- A = Away match
- pen. = Penalty kick
- o.g. = Own goal

Results

Date	Opponents	Result	Goalscorers	Attendance
3 September 1913	Coventry City (H)	0–2		5,000
6 September 1913	Queens Park Rangers (H)	1–0	Gilligan	6,000
11 September 1913	Coventry City (A)	3–2	Caldwell, Pinkney, Gilligan	5,000
13 September 1913	Northampton Town (A)	1–3	Hafekost	not recorded
20 September 1913	Southend United (H)	4–2	Lee (2), Glen, Johnson (pen.)	6,000
24 September 1913	Plymouth Argyle (H)	4–0	Caldwell, Gilligan, Hafekost, Pinkney	5,000
27 September 1913	Brighton & Hove Albion (A)	0–2		6,000
4 October 1913	Portsmouth (H)	0–1		8,000
11 October 1913	Millwall (A)	0–0		not recorded
18 October 1913	Exeter City (H)	2–0	Gilligan, Glen	7,000
25 October 1913	Cardiff City (A)	0–2		11,000
1 November 1913	Swindon Town (H)	2–3	Glen (2)	12,000
8 November 1913	Bristol Rovers (A)	1–3	Hafekost	8,000
15 November 1913	Merthyr Town (H)	2–1	Pinkney, Glen	6,000
22 November 1913	West Ham United (A)	1–3	Caldwell	10,000
6 December 1913	Southampton (A)	1–3	Glen	not recorded
20 December 1913	Crystal Palace (A)	0–1		6,000
25 December 1913	Watford (A)	2–0	Hafekost (2)	7,000
26 December 1913	Watford (H)	3–0	Hafekost, Goffin, Glen	6,000
27 December 1913	Queens Park Rangers (A)	0–0		8,000
3 January 1914	Northampton Town (H)	1–1	Pinkney	6,000
17 January 1914	Southend United (A)	3–2	Pinkney, Gilligan, Glen	5,000
24 January 1914	Brighton & Hove Albion (H)	4–0	Hafekost (2), Mahon, Leslie (pen.)	6,000
7 February 1914	Portsmouth (A)	0–0		7,000
14 February 1914	Millwall (H)	2–2	Weavers, Hafekost	6,000
21 February 1914	Exeter City (A)	0–2		2,500
28 February 1914	Cardiff City (H)	0–0		6,000
7 March 1914	Swindon Town (A)	1–5	Hafekost	4,000
14 March 1914	Bristol Rovers (H)	3–0	Leslie (pen.), Pinkney, Goffin	5,000
21 March 1914	Merthyr Town (A)	0–2		5,000
28 March 1914	West Ham United (H)	3–1	Gilligan (2), Pinkney	7,000
1 April 1914	Reading (H)	0–0		5,000
4 April 1914	Plymouth Argyle (A)	0–1		6,000
10 April 1914	Norwich City (H)	0–0		7,000
11 April 1914	Southampton (H)	3–1	Pinkney (2), McAlpine (o.g.)	7,000
13 April 1914	Norwich City (A)	0–2		12,000
18 April 1914	Reading (A)	0–1		not recorded
25 April 1914	Crystal Palace (H)	1–1	Fotheringham	8,000

=== Partial league table ===
Southern League Division One final table, positions 11 to 15
Pos	Team	Pld	W	D	L	GF	GA	GAv	Pts
11	Southampton	38	15	7	16	55	54	1.019	37
12	Exeter City	38	10	16	12	39	38	1.026	36
13	Gillingham	38	13	9	16	48	49	0.980	35
14	Norwich City	38	9	17	12	49	51	0.961	35
15	Millwall	38	11	12	15	51	56	0.911	34

== FA Cup ==
As a Southern League Division One club, Gillingham entered the 1913–14 FA Cup in the fourth qualifying round at the end of November; their opponents were Nunhead of the amateur Isthmian League. Goals from Glen and Gilligan gave Gillingham a 2–0 win; the correspondent for The People wrote that the result was no surprise and that Nunhead's forwards were "seldom allowed to become dangerous". In the fifth and final qualifying round, Gillingham played fellow Southern League Division One team Watford and won 1–0 with a goal from Abel Lee. The teams from the Football League entered the competition in the first round proper and Gillingham were drawn to play Blackpool of the Second Division; the attendance of 10,581 was one of the largest of the season at Priestfield Road. Leslie gave Gillingham the lead with a penalty kick in the first half and it proved to be the only goal of the game.

In the second round, Gillingham played away to Liverpool of the First Division. The attendance of 42,045 at Anfield was the largest crowd to date for a match involving Gillingham, a record which would stand until 1999; Gillingham's share of the gate receipts was another new club record at nearly £620 (equivalent to £80,000 in 2023). The game remained goalless for more than 75 minutes, but after Andrew Mosley, one of Gillingham's full-backs, suffered a serious eye injury and had to leave the field, Liverpool scored twice to eliminate Gillingham from the competition. The writer for the Sunday Dispatch said that Gillingham "gave a very pluck[y] display" and that if their forwards had taken advantage of playing with the wind behind them in the first half the result could have been different.

=== Cup match details ===
Key

- In the result column, Gillingham's score is shown first
- H = Home match
- A = Away match
- pen. = Penalty kick

Results

Date	Round	Opponents	Result	Goalscorers	Attendance
29 November 1913	Fourth qualifying	Nunhead (H)	2–0	Glen, Gilligan	5,000
13 December 1913	Fifth qualifying	Watford (H)	1–0	Lee	6,000
10 January 1914	First	Blackpool (H)	1–0	Leslie (pen.)	10,581
31 January 1914	Second	Liverpool (A)	0–2		42,045

== Players ==
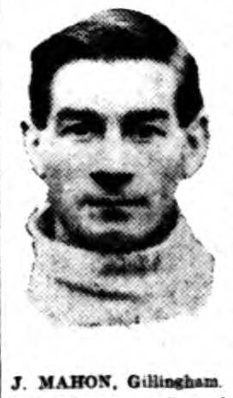
Jack Mahon played in every one of Gillingham's games during the season.

Abel Lee made 38 appearances.

During the season, 23 players made at least one appearance for Gillingham. Leslie and Mahon made the most, both playing in every one of the team's 42 competitive matches. Bailey and Arthur Johnson both missed only one game and Mosley missed only two.

Hafekost was the leading goalscorer with 10 goals, all scored in league games. Pinkney scored nine, all in the league, and Glen scored eight times in the league and once in the FA Cup. Gilligan finished the season with eight goals in total; no other player scored more than three times.

Player statistics
Player	Position	Southern League Division One		FA Cup		Total	
Player	Position	Apps	Goals	Apps	Goals	Apps	Goals
Albert Bailey	GK	37	0	4	0	41	0
Tom Caldwell	FW	21	3	1	0	22	3
Albert Court	FW	2	0	0	0	2	0
E. Diddams	HB	3	0	0	0	3	0
Charles Fotheringham	FW	3	1	0	0	3	1
Charlie Frost	FW	1	0	0	0	1	0
W. Frost	FB	2	0	0	0	2	0
Sam Gilligan	FW	33	7	3	1	36	8
Peter Glen	FW	29	8	4	1	33	9
Dick Goffin	FW	10	2	1	0	11	2
Charlie Hafekost	FW	29	10	4	0	33	10
Sam Hulses	HB	1	0	0	0	1	0
Cornelius John	FW	6	0	1	0	7	0
Arthur Johnson	HB	37	1	4	0	41	1
Abel Lee	HB	34	2	4	1	38	3
Tom Leslie	FB	38	2	4	1	42	3
Jack Mahon	HB	38	1	4	0	42	1
Andrew Mosley	FB	36	0	4	0	40	0
Bill Pepper	GK	1	0	0	0	1	0
Ernie Pinkney	FW	35	9	3	0	38	9
John Tatton	FW	19	0	2	0	21	0
Sidney Weavers	FW	2	1	1	0	3	1
Thomas Whiteside	HB	1	0	0	0	1	0

FW = Forward, HB = Half-back, GK = Goalkeeper, FB = Full-back

== Aftermath ==
At the end of the season, Hafekost left the club to join Liverpool; Tom Watson, the Liverpool manager, had reportedly been impressed with the forward's performance in the cup match between the two teams. "Bee", a writer for the Liverpool Echo, described the signing as an "excellent capture", but Hafekost would only go on to play one Football League match for Liverpool. Buoyed by the increased level of attendance at Priestfield Road during the 1913–14 season, Gillingham's board of directors secured a bank loan of £1,570 (equivalent to £190,000 in 2023) to fund the building of a new grandstand. Only a few weeks after the new stand was opened to the public, however, it suffered major damage due to gale-force winds, including having the roof torn off.

Despite the outbreak of the First World War in July 1914, the 1914–15 football season took place as normal; Gillingham finished 20th out of 20 teams in the Southern League Division One. Owing to the escalation of the war and growing public sentiment that continuing sporting events as normal was not appropriate, the Southern League, along with all other major football competitions in England, was abandoned in 1915 and did not resume for four years. Temporary regional leagues, featuring amateur players only, took place in the intervening years, but Gillingham did not take part. Mosley and Pepper, who had played for Gillingham during the 1913–14 season, were both killed in action during the war.

== Footnotes ==
a. The concept of substitutes was not introduced to English football until the 1960s; previously, if a player had to leave a game due to injury, the team had to continue with a reduced number of players.
