= 1914–15 Gillingham F.C. season =

English football club season

Gillingham
1914–15 season
- Chairman: Edward Crawley
- Manager: Sam Gilligan
- Southern League Division One: 20th
- FA Cup: First round
- Top goalscorer: League: Sam Gilligan, Peter Glen (both 8); All: Sam Gilligan, Peter Glen (both 8)
- Highest home attendance: 8,000 vs Swindon Town (10 October 1914)
- Lowest home attendance: 2,000 (four matches)
Home colours

During the 1914–15 English football season, Gillingham F.C. competed in the Southern League Division One. It was the 21st season in which the club competed in the Southern League and the 20th in Division One. The season went ahead despite the fact that Britain had entered the First World War in August 1914. Gillingham won twice in their first eight matches of the season but then began a run of games without a victory which lasted for nearly four months; in October and November they lost six consecutive games, including a heavy 8–1 defeat to Croydon Common. The team's performances improved in the second half of the season, with two victories in February and two more in April, but Gillingham finished the season in 20th and last place in the league table, their worst performance in Division One.

Gillingham also competed in the FA Cup but lost in the first round. The team played 39 competitive matches, winning 6, drawing 8, and losing 25. Sam Gilligan, the team's player-manager, and Peter Glen tied as top goalscorer with eight goals each. Tom Leslie made the most appearances, playing in every game. The highest recorded attendance at the club's home ground, Priestfield Road, was 8,000 for the game against Swindon Town in October. Due to the escalation of the war and public opposition to sporting events continuing as normal, professional football in England closed down at the end of the season and Gillingham would not play another game for more than four years.

== Background and pre-season ==
The magazine Punch was critical of the decision to allow professional football to continue after the outbreak of war.

Founded in 1893 under the name New Brompton, Gillingham had played in the Southern League since the competition's formation in 1894. They gained promotion from Division Two at the first attempt in 1895 and had remained in Division One ever since, albeit with little success. The team had only finished in the top half of the league table once in the preceding nine seasons; in the 1913–14 season, Gillingham had finished in 13th place out of 20 teams in the division, their best performance for four years. At the time, the majority of clubs in the two divisions of the ostensibly national Football League were from the northern half of the country, and the Southern League included many of the leading clubs from the south. Discussions had taken place for several years over whether the two leagues should be amalgamated, or alternatively whether they should remain separate but operate a system of promotion and relegation between the two competitions.

The 1914–15 football season went ahead as normal despite the fact that Britain had entered the First World War less than a month before the season began. The decision was not universally supported, however: while "Sportsman" of the Surrey Mirror wrote that "the provision of healthful recreation and innocent pleasure should be encouraged at this particular stage", the Hull Daily Mail printed a lengthy letter from a correspondent who wrote that it was "jarring and nauseating" to hear of teams preparing for the new Football League season while British soldiers were engaged in conflict. Shortly after the start of the season, the magazine Punch printed a cartoon drawn by Leonard Raven-Hill depicting its mascot Mr Punch holding a newspaper with a headline about the fighting and saying to a professional footballer "No doubt you can make money in this field, my friend, but there's only one field today where you can get honour".

Sam Gilligan was Gillingham's player-manager, a position he had held since July 1913. Charlie Hafekost, the team's leading goalscorer during the previous season, left the club to join Liverpool. "Bee", a writer for the Liverpool Echo, described the signing as an "excellent capture", but Hafekost would go on to play only one Football League match for Liverpool. Gillingham signed a new forward, Bill Hooper, who had made nearly 150 appearances in the Football League for Nottingham Forest. Buoyed by an increased level of attendance at the club's home ground, Priestfield Road, during the 1913–14 season, Gillingham's board of directors secured a bank loan of £1,570 (equivalent to £190,000 in 2023) to fund the building of a new grandstand, although it was not completed in time for the start of the season. The team wore the red and blue kit which had replaced the club's original black and white colours two years earlier.

== Southern League Division One ==
=== September–December ===
Gillingham's first game of the season was away to West Ham United; Hooper made his debut, as did another new forward, Matthew Lovett, but the latter player was replaced by Gilligan for the next game and would not play again for more than six months. Peter Glen scored Gillingham's first goal of the season, but two goals from Syd Puddefoot gave West Ham a 2–1 victory. The next game, away to Brighton & Hove Albion, produced a similar outcome as Ernie Pinkney scored for Gillingham but their opponents scored twice to secure the win. The first game of the season at Priestfield Road was on 9 September against West Ham United. Glen scored in the first half to give Gillingham the lead. After the interval, West Ham's goalkeeper made a number of saves but was beaten by a penalty kick from Tom Leslie, after which Gillingham scored twice more to complete a 4–0 win. A goal from Abel Lee secured a 1–1 draw with Cardiff City on 12 September but Gillingham lost their next three games. The run began with a 2–0 defeat away to Exeter City on 19 September. A week later, Gillingham were defeated at Priestfield Road for the first time since the previous November, losing 4–2 to Luton Town. A 1–0 defeat away to Portsmouth in the first match of October left Gillingham in 19th place out of 20 teams in the league table. The crowd included a party of wounded soldiers from a military hospital at nearby Southsea.

Ernie Pinkney scored Gillingham's only goal in their 8–1 defeat to Croydon Common.

On 10 October, Gillingham played the previous season's Southern League champions, Swindon Town, at Priestfield Road. Gilligan scored twice in a 4–0 victory for the home team, which The Sporting Life said was "thoroughly deserved", but it would be their last win for more than four months. After a 1–1 draw against Southend United on 17 October, Gillingham lost six consecutive matches. Glen and Pinkney, who had both missed the previous game due to influenza, returned for the match at home to Queens Park Rangers on 24 October, but neither scored a goal and Gillingham lost 1–0. The winless run continued with a 3–0 defeat to Millwall and a 1–0 loss to Bristol Rovers in which Gillingham's Arthur Johnson was sent off. On 14 November, Gillingham played away to Croydon Common, who were 19th in the league table, above only Gillingham themselves. Gillingham made changes to their defence for the game, giving debuts to two players. F. Hall played in place of the team's regular goalkeeper, Albert Bailey, and B. Burgess took the place of Andrew Mosley at full-back. Croydon Common, who had scored only 10 goals in their first 12 league games, scored six times in the first half and ultimately won the match 8–1; it was the first time for more than two years that Gillingham had conceded as many goals. Hall never played another game for Gillingham's first team. Another heavy defeat followed a week later as Gillingham lost 5–0 to the league leaders Reading at Priestfield Road. Jack Mahon scored only Gillingham's second goal in the last six matches against Southampton on 28 November, but his team lost 2–1.

After six consecutive defeats, Gillingham began December by coming from two goals down to secure a 2–2 draw at home to Northampton Town. A week later, they lost 4–0 away to Watford; Don Weightman made his debut at half-back and would play in every game for the remainder of the season. For the next game, against Plymouth Argyle, he was moved to forward and was "conspicuous with a couple of good efforts" according to the Weekly Dispatch, but the game finished goalless. Gillingham's final two games of the year were both against Norwich City, on Christmas Day and Boxing Day. Glen asked the club's board of directors for permission to miss the Christmas Day game to get married, but his request was refused. In a game which was interrupted by fog for nearly an hour, Gillingham took a 3–1 lead, Glen scoring the third goal, but then conceded two goals in the final three minutes and the game finished in a draw. In the reverse fixture the following day, Norwich scored in the first minute and added two more goals before half-time. The final score was 4–0 to Norwich; the Weekly Dispatch wrote that "Norwich won easily" and that Gillingham "were the inferior side". On the night of 28 December, large parts of the south of England were lashed by heavy gales; the new grandstand at Priestfield Road, which had still not been completed, was severely damaged. The cost of the repairs was estimated at £600 (equivalent to £70,000 in 2023) and it would be several months before the work was completed.

=== January–April ===
Jack Branfield made his debut close to the end of the season. He would go on to be one of the few players to return to the club after the war.

Gillingham's first match of 1915 was at home to Brighton & Hove Albion on 2 January. After an even and scoreless first half, Glen gave Gillingham the lead, but Brighton then scored three times to win the game, extending their opponents' winless run to 13 games. Gillingham lost by the same score away to Cardiff City two weeks later, but then ended their run of defeats with a goalless draw against Exeter City. They ended the month of January with a 3–1 defeat to Luton Town. Having last won a match on 10 October, Gillingham beat Portsmouth 3–1 at Priestfield Road on 6 February to secure their first victory for more than four months. A week later, they played away to Swindon Town, one of the only three teams they had defeated during the season so far, but were beaten 5–1. Gillingham made a stronger start in a game played in extremely wet and windy conditions before a very small crowd, but the Weekly Dispatch wrote that Swindon displayed "more purpose and greater stamina" and that in the second half "the pace of their forwards left the Gillingham backs bewildered". Weightman scored Gillingham's goal, his third in as many games. A goal from Gilligan gave Gillingham another victory on 20 February as they beat Southend United 1–0, although the Kent Messenger contended that they were lucky and that Southend were the better team. Glen was in the team for the first time in six weeks for the game away to Queens Park Rangers on 27 February but failed to score; Gillingham lost the match 3–0.

Gillingham's first game of March resulted in a goalless draw with Millwall at Priestfield Road. A week later, they lost 2–1 to Bristol Rovers; the Weekly Dispatch wrote that Gillingham's opponents were "a shade the smarter team" but that both sides "were far from accurate near goal". On 20 March, Gillingham played at home to Croydon Common, who had inflicted their worst defeat of the season on them four months earlier. After falling a goal behind, Gillingham took the lead when Glen and Pinkney scored in the second half. They had to settle for a draw, though, after Croydon Common scored a late goal. The Sporting Life stated that Gillingham deserved to win and were only prevented from doing so by "an extraordinarily smart display of goalkeeping on the part of the Croydon Common custodian". In their final match of March, Gillingham played away to Reading; the quality of play in the first half was so poor that many fans walked out at half-time. Glen came close to scoring for Gillingham but his team lost 1–0.

Having only won four times in the league between September and March, Gillingham began the month of April with two victories on consecutive days. On 2 April, they beat Crystal Palace 3–0 at Priestfield Road; John Tatton scored two goals, only the second time during the season that a Gillingham player had scored more than once in a game. A day later, they beat Southampton 4–3 with two goals each from Glen and Gilligan. Jack Branfield made his debut in goal in the latter game; he would go on to be the sole pre-war Gillingham player to play for the club in the Football League after Gillingham joined it in 1920. Despite the two victories, Gillingham remained in 20th and last place in the league table. Their final four games of the season all ended in defeat. Against Crystal Palace on 5 April Branfield conceded an early goal and, although he saved a penalty kick in the second half to keep the score at 1–0, Gillingham were unable to score an equaliser and lost to the only goal of the game. They were defeated again five days later away to Northampton Town; Gillingham lost 4–0 after being forced to play with ten men for more than an hour after Glen was injured.^{[a]} In their final home game of the season, Gillingham and Watford were level at 2–2 at half-time, Leslie and Glen having scored for Gillingham, but Watford added a third goal in the second half to claim victory and clinch the championship of the Southern League. Gillingham's final game of the season was away to Plymouth Argyle. Weightman scored twice, taking his tally to seven goals, but Gillingham lost 4–2. They finished the season in 20th place, seven points below 19th-placed Croydon Common; it was Gillingham's worst finish to a season in their 20 seasons in the Southern League Division One. They had lost the most games, scored the fewest goals and conceded the most of any team in the division.

=== League match details ===
Key

- In the result column, Gillingham's score is shown first
- H = Home match
- A = Away match
- pen. = Penalty kick

Results

Date	Opponents	Result	Goalscorers	Attendance
1 September 1914	West Ham United (A)	1–2	Glen	5,000
5 September 1914	Brighton & Hove Albion (A)	1–2	Pinkney	3,000
9 September 1914	West Ham United (H)	4–0	Glen, Leslie (pen.), Lee, Hooper	2,500
12 September 1914	Cardiff City (H)	1–1	Lee	2,500
19 September 1914	Exeter City (A)	0–2		4,000
26 September 1914	Luton Town (H)	2–4	Leslie (pen.), Lee	5,000
3 October 1914	Portsmouth (A)	0–1		8,000
10 October 1914	Swindon Town (H)	4–0	Gilligan (2), Leslie (pen.), Pinkney	8,000
17 October 1914	Southend United (A)	1–1	Thomas	5,000
24 October 1914	Queens Park Rangers (H)	0–1		7,000
31 October 1914	Millwall (A)	0–3		not recorded
7 November 1914	Bristol Rovers (H)	0–1		7,000
14 November 1914	Croydon Common (A)	1–8	Pinkney	4,000
21 November 1914	Reading (H)	0–5		3,000
28 November 1914	Southampton (A)	1–2	Mahon	2,000
5 December 1914	Northampton Town (H)	2–2	Weavers, Leslie (pen.)	2,000
12 December 1914	Watford (A)	0–4		2,500
19 December 1914	Plymouth Argyle (H)	0–0		6,500
25 December 1914	Norwich City (H)	3–3	Gilligan, Weightman, Glen	2,000
26 December 1914	Norwich City (A)	0–4		3,000
2 January 1915	Brighton & Hove Albion (H)	1–3	Glen	2,500
16 January 1915	Cardiff City (A)	1–3	Thomas	4,000
23 January 1915	Exeter City (H)	0–0		2,000
30 January 1915	Luton Town (A)	1–3	Weightman	not recorded
6 February 1915	Portsmouth (H)	3–1	Weightman, Thomas, Gilligan	2,000
13 February 1915	Swindon Town (A)	1–5	Weightman	not recorded
20 February 1915	Southend United (H)	1–0	Gilligan	3,000
27 February 1915	Queens Park Rangers (A)	0–3		3,000
6 March 1915	Millwall (H)	0–0		3,000
13 March 1915	Bristol Rovers (A)	1–2	Gilligan	3,000
20 March 1915	Croydon Common (H)	2–2	Glen, Pinkney	3,000
27 March 1915	Reading (A)	0–1		not recorded
2 April 1915	Crystal Palace (H)	3–0	Tatton (2), Weightman	6,000
3 April 1915	Southampton (H)	4–3	Glen (2), Gilligan (2)	3,000
5 April 1915	Crystal Palace (A)	0–1		not recorded
10 April 1915	Northampton Town (A)	0–4		not recorded
17 April 1915	Watford (H)	2–3	Leslie (pen.), Glen	3,000
24 April 1915	Plymouth Argyle (A)	2–3	Weightman (2)	5,000

=== Partial league table ===
Southern League Division One final table, bottom positions
Pos	Team	Pld	W	D	L	GF	GA	GAv	Pts
16	Bristol Rovers	38	14	3	21	53	75	0.707	31
17	Plymouth Argyle	38	8	14	16	51	61	0.836	30
18	Southend United	38	10	8	20	44	64	0.688	28
19	Croydon Common	38	9	9	20	47	63	0.746	27
20	Gillingham	38	6	8	24	43	82	0.524	20

== FA Cup ==
Gillingham entered the 1914–15 FA Cup at the first-round stage in January; their opponents were Rochdale of the Central League, who had had to win three qualifying matches to reach this stage of the competition. Rochdale scored two goals in the first half and won 2–0, eliminating Gillingham from the FA Cup.

=== Cup match details ===
Key

- In the result column, Gillingham's score is shown first
- H = Home match
- A = Away match

Results

Date	Round	Opponents	Result	Goalscorers	Attendance
9 January 1915	First	Rochdale (A)	0–2		6,000

== Players ==
Sam Gilligan was the team's joint top goalscorer.

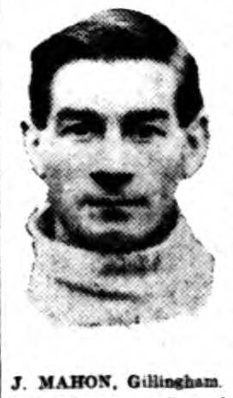
Jack Mahon made 37 appearances during the season.

During the season, 22 players took the field at least once for Gillingham. Leslie made the most appearances, playing in all 39 of the team's matches. Mahon missed only two games and Gilligan, Mosley, and Tatton all made more than 30 appearances. There were three players who were in the line-up for only one match, including the goalkeeper F. Hall, whose sole appearance represented the entirety of his Gillingham career. Eleven players scored at least one goal for the team during the season. Gilligan and Glen tied as the team's top scorer with eight goals each.

Player statistics
Player	Position	Southern League Division One		FA Cup		Total	
Player	Position	Apps	Goals	Apps	Goals	Apps	Goals
Albert Bailey	GK	35	0	1	0	36	0
Jack Branfield	GK	2	0	0	0	2	0
B. Burgess	FB	4	0	0	0	4	0
Charles Fotheringham	FW	1	0	0	0	1	0
William Frost	FB	1	0	0	0	1	0
Sam Gilligan	FW	32	8	1	0	33	8
Peter Glen	FW	25	8	1	0	26	8
George Gray	HB	16	0	0	0	16	0
F. Hall	GK	1	0	0	0	1	0
Bill Hooper	FW	25	1	0	0	25	1
Arthur Johnson	HB	29	0	1	0	30	0
Abel Lee	HB	28	3	1	0	29	3
Tom Leslie	FB	38	5	1	0	39	5
Matthew Lovett	FW	2	0	0	0	2	0
Jack Mahon	HB	36	1	1	0	37	1
Andrew Mosley	FB	34	0	1	0	35	0
Ernie Pinkney	FW	28	4	1	0	29	4
John Tatton	FW	30	2	1	0	31	2
Bill Thomas	FW	18	3	0	0	18	3
Sidney Weavers	FW	5	1	0	0	5	1
Don Weightman	FW	22	7	1	0	23	7
W. Wimsett	FW	6	0	0	0	6	0

FW = Forward, HB = Half-back, GK = Goalkeeper, FB = Full-back

== Aftermath ==
Owing to the escalation of the war and growing public sentiment that continuing sporting events as normal was not appropriate, all major football competitions in England, including the Southern League, closed down in 1915 and did not resume for four years. Temporary regional leagues, featuring amateur players only, took place in the intervening years, but Gillingham did not take part. Mosley, one of Gillingham's regular starters during the 1914–15 season, was killed in action during the war. Most of the team's other pre-war players, including the player-manager Gilligan, did not return to the club after the hostilities; when Gillingham played their first game for more than four years in August 1919, there were only two players in the team who had represented the club before the war. Although Gillingham's last-place finish would ordinarily have resulted in relegation to Division Two, when the Southern League resumed they were again placed in Division One. A year later, all the clubs in the division were admitted to the Football League en masse to form its new Third Division.

== Footnotes ==
a. The concept of substitutes was not introduced to English football until the 1960s; previously, if a player had to leave a game due to injury, the team had to continue with a reduced number of players.
