= 1912–13 Gillingham F.C. season =

English football club season

Gillingham
1912–13 season
- Chairman: Edward Crawley
- Secretary: William Ironside Groombridge
- Southern League Div. One: 15th
- FA Cup: First round
- Top goalscorer: League: John Boden, Dick Goffin, Charlie Hafekost (5 each); All: Arthur Wolstenholme (7)
- Highest home attendance: 11,321 vs Barnsley (11 January 1913)
- Lowest home attendance: 1,500 vs Plymouth Argyle (30 April 1913)
Home colours

During the 1912–13 English football season, Gillingham F.C. competed in the Southern League Division One. It was the 19th season in which the club competed in the Southern League and the 18th in Division One. The team competed under the name Gillingham for the first time, having previously been called New Brompton, and also adopted red and blue shirts, replacing the previous black and white stripes. Gillingham began the season in poor form and did not score a single goal in their first six home matches. The team achieved a four-game unbeaten run in November but at the end of December were 16th out of 20 teams in the league table. In the second half of the season the team's form remained inconsistent: they lost every league game in January but had a six-game unbeaten run in March and April. Gillingham finished the season 15th in the table.

Gillingham also competed in the FA Cup. After holding Barnsley, the previous season's winners of the competition, to a draw at home in the first round, Gillingham were defeated in a replay at Barnsley's ground. The team played 42 competitive matches, winning 13, drawing 12, and losing 17. Arthur Wolstenholme was the team's top goalscorer, with four goals in the league and seven in total. John Boden, Dick Goffin, and Charlie Hafekost were the joint highest scorers in league matches only, with five goals each. Andrew Mosley made the most appearances, playing in every game. The highest attendance recorded at the club's home ground, Priestfield Road, was 11,321 for the FA Cup match against Barnsley.

== Background and pre-season ==
Gillingham, founded in 1893 under the name New Brompton, had played in the Southern League since the competition's formation in 1894; the team had been promoted from Division Two in 1895 and remained in Division One ever since, but with little success. The team had only finished in the top half of the league table once in the preceding seven seasons and in the 1911–12 season had finished 18th out of 20 teams, avoiding relegation to Division Two by just one place. At the time, the majority of clubs in the two divisions of the ostensibly national Football League were from the northern half of the country, and some of the leading clubs from the south played in the Southern League. In 1920, the clubs in the Southern League's top division would be admitted to the Football League en masse to form its new Third Division.

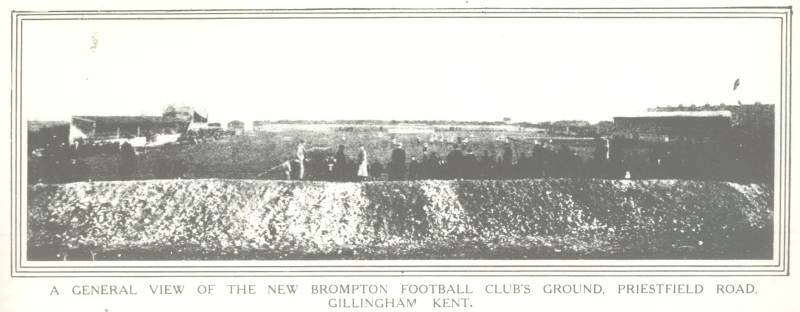
The Supporters' Association planned to raise finds to improve the club's Priestfield Road ground.

On 6 June, the club's board of directors took the decision to change the club's name to Gillingham Football Club to reflect the fact that in the decades since the club's formation the previously small settlement of Gillingham had outgrown and absorbed New Brompton. The name change would not be formally approved by the shareholders until the following summer; nonetheless the team played under the new name in the 1912–13 season. Two days later, the first recorded meeting of the club's Supporters' Association took place, at which it was resolved to raise money to finance the building of more terracing at one end of the club's Priestfield Road ground. Along with the new name, the club adopted a new kit featuring red shirts with blue sleeves, replacing the previous black and white stripes, and for the first time added the coat of arms of the borough to the shirts.

As was often the case in the early 20th century, the club did not employ a full-time team manager; most tasks associated with a modern manager, such as the signing of new players, were among the responsibilities of the club's secretary, William Ironside Groombridge. New players to join the club included Arthur Wolstenholme, a forward who had last played for Blackpool of the Football League Second Division. Two players from Leyton, who had dropped out of the Southern League at the end of the previous season, also joined Gillingham: Tom Leslie, a full-back who had previously played for Tottenham Hotspur, and the veteran half-back Mark Bell, who had gained one cap for Scotland a decade earlier.

== Southern League Division One ==
=== September–December ===
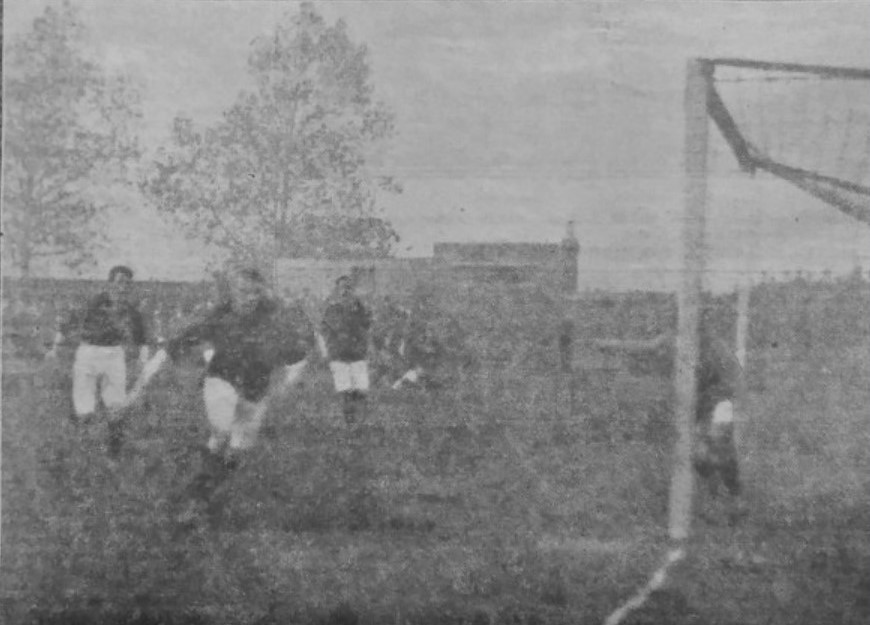
Gillingham attacking the Swindon Town goal in the match between the two teams in October

The club's first match of the season, on 7 September, was away to Northampton Town. Wolstenholme scored a goal on his debut for the club, but Gillingham lost 2–1 in what The People called a "capital game". The first home game a week later resulted in a 0–0 draw against Queens Park Rangers (QPR); the writer for The People noted that the game was even in the first half but that QPR attacked more in the second. Gillingham achieved their first win of the season on 21 September when a late goal from Albert Court gave them a 1–0 victory away to Brentford. They ended September by again drawing 0–0 at home, this time with Millwall, and began October with two away games, losing 2–1 to Reading and winning 2–0 against Bristol Rovers, who had lost every game of the season so far. The game on 12 October against Swindon Town ended in a third consecutive home 0–0 draw; the first goal of the season at Priestfield Road was scored four days later by Reading, who went on to secure a 4–0 victory. The reporter for the Daily Herald wrote that Gillingham attacked more than their opponents in the first half but in the second they were "all adrift" and "the few attacks they made were not at all dangerous".

Albert Bailey, Gillingham's goalkeeper, was hospitalised after suffering a broken jaw during a 4–0 defeat to Exeter City on 26 October; Harry Crane took his place in the team for the next game, a 4–0 defeat to West Ham United; it was Gillingham's fourth consecutive defeat, three of them by a score of 4–0. A goalless draw at home to Brighton & Hove Albion on 9 November meant that Gillingham had scored only one goal in their last six league matches and had still not registered a goal in a home match. The team ended a six-match winless run with a 2–1 victory away to Coventry City on 16 November with goals from John Boden and Dick Goffin. A week later, Boden scored Gillingham's first goal of the season at Priestfield Road in their seventh home game. The team's captain, Jack Mahon, was missing due to injury but despite his absence the team secured a 2–0 victory over Watford. Boden scored for the third consecutive game in a 1–1 draw at home to Merthyr Town in the final match of November; it meant that Gillingham had gone four games without defeat, their longest undefeated run of the season to this point.

Boden scored for the fourth consecutive game in a 2–1 defeat at home to Crystal Palace on 7 December; he had a chance to score a second goal but his penalty kick was saved. Gillingham also lost their next game at home, a 1–0 defeat to Southampton. The team ended 1912 with three games in four days. On Christmas Day, they played at home to Norwich City; in a match played in pouring rain and a high wind, a goal from Goffin gave the home team a 1–0 victory. The teams played again the following day at The Nest, Norwich's home ground, and Gillingham lost 4–0; an injury to Abel Lee meant that Gillingham had to play the whole of the second half with only ten men. Arthur Johnson, who had missed the last two games after previously having been ever-present in the team, returned to the team in place of Lee for the final game of 1912 and scored from a penalty in a 2–1 victory over Northampton Town. The result left Gillingham 16th out of 20 teams in the table at the end of 1912.

=== January–April ===
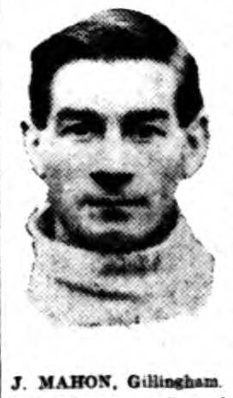
Jack Mahon, the team's captain, made his first appearance for nearly two months in January.

Gillingham's first match of 1913 was away to Queens Park Rangers on 4 January; Mahon made his first appearance since November. QPR scored in the first half and, although Gillingham had several shots on goal, they could not equalise and their opponents added a second goal in the final minute of the game. Gillingham again failed to score in the next league game, losing 4–0 at home to Brentford; it was the first time Brentford had won away from home during the season and the writer for the Daily Herald commented that the Gillingham players looked tired after playing an FA Cup game two days earlier. Bailey returned to the team on 25 January for the first time since October; a 2–1 defeat away to Millwall meant that Gillingham had lost every league game during the month. The writer for The People was of the opinion that the result could have been different if Gillingham had had "a steadier line of forwards". The team ended their winless run with a 1–0 victory over Bristol Rovers thanks to a goal from Wolstenholme. Jock Taylor scored twice in a 2–1 win over Portsmouth on 22 February; Gillingham ended the month 17th in the table.

Gillingham's first game of March was a 2–0 defeat away to Exeter City; Johnson appeared to have pulled a goal back for Gillingham with a penalty, but the referee ordered the kick to be retaken due to an infringement and at the second attempt he missed. It would prove to be the final game in a Gillingham shirt for Boden, Wolstenholme, and Taylor. For the next game at home to West Ham United wholesale changes were made to the forward line: Charlie Hafekost made his first appearance since December, Cornelius John played only his second game of the season and his first since November, and A.G. Church made his debut. Despite the new-look line-up, the writer for The People noted that the Gillingham forwards "worked neatly together in the early stages and gave the visitors' defenders great anxiety". Hafekost gave Gillingham an early lead and, although West Ham scored twice before half-time, a goal from Tom Caldwell in the second half secured a draw for Gillingham. The new forwards retained their places but could not score any goals in the next two games, which resulted in a 1–0 defeat to Brighton & Hove Albion and a goalless draw with Stoke; Gillingham were spared a second consecutive defeat when Stoke had a late goal disallowed for offside.

Goffin scored twice in a 3–0 victory at home to Coventry City on 22 March; all the goals were scored in the first half. Two days later, two goals from Lee secured a 2–0 win away to Stoke, whom the reporter for The Western Times said were "lamentably weak"; the results meant that Gillingham had gone three games without conceding a goal for the first time since September. Following two draws, a goal from Church gave Gillingham a 1–0 win away to Crystal Palace on 12 April, extending the team's unbeaten run to six games. The streak came to an end a week later with a 4–0 defeat away to Plymouth Argyle. Having only scored more than two goals in a game once during the first 36 league matches, Gillingham achieved the feat in both of the last two games of the season. A 3–3 draw away to Southampton was followed by a 4–2 win at Priestfield Road over Plymouth, who were already assured of the Division One championship; it was the first time the team had scored four times in a match since January 1912. John and Lee gave Gillingham a half-time lead and Johnson scored two goals after the interval, both from penalty kicks. Gillingham finished the campaign 15th in the league table, seven points above the relegation places. It was an improvement on the previous season's performance but the team's fourth consecutive finish in the bottom half of the table.

=== League match details ===
Key

- In the result column, Gillingham's score is shown first
- H = Home match
- A = Away match
- pen. = Penalty kick
- o.g. = Own goal

Results

Date	Opponents	Result	Goalscorers	Attendance
7 September 1912	Northampton Town (A)	1–2	Wolstenholme	8,000
14 September 1912	Queens Park Rangers (H)	0–0		8,000
21 September 1912	Brentford (A)	1–0	Court	6,000
28 September 1912	Millwall (H)	0–0		8,000
2 October 1912	Reading (A)	1–2	Frost	not recorded
5 October 1912	Bristol Rovers (A)	2–0	Wolstenholme, Goffin	5,000
12 October 1912	Swindon Town (H)	0–0		not recorded
16 October 1912	Reading (H)	0–4		3,000
19 October 1912	Portsmouth (A)	1–2	Hafekost	12,000
26 October 1912	Exeter City (H)	0–4		3,000
2 November 1912	West Ham United (A)	0–4		10,000
9 November 1912	Brighton & Hove Albion (H)	0–0		6,000
16 November 1912	Coventry City (A)	2–1	Boden, Goffin	7,000
23 November 1912	Watford (H)	2–0	Boden, Taylor	not recorded
30 November 1912	Merthyr Town (H)	1–1	Boden	5,000
7 December 1912	Crystal Palace (H)	1–2	Boden	5,000
21 December 1912	Southampton (H)	0–1		5,000
25 December 1912	Norwich City (H)	1–0	Goffin	4,000
26 December 1912	Norwich City (A)	0–4		6,000
28 December 1912	Northampton Town (H)	2–1	Caldwell, Johnson (pen.)	5,000
4 January 1913	Queens Park Rangers (A)	0–2		8,000
18 January 1913	Brentford (H)	0–4		5,000
25 January 1913	Millwall (A)	1–2	Wolstenholme	not recorded
8 February 1913	Bristol Rovers (H)	1–0	Wolstenholme	5,000
15 February 1913	Swindon Town (A)	1–2	Boden	not recorded
22 February 1913	Portsmouth (H)	2–0	Taylor (2)	6,000
1 March 1913	Exeter City (A)	0–2		5,000
8 March 1913	West Ham United (H)	2–2	Hafekost, Caldwell	4,000
15 March 1913	Brighton & Hove Albion (A)	0–1		3,500
21 March 1913	Stoke (H)	0–0		5,000
22 March 1913	Coventry City (H)	3–0	Goffin (2), Hafekost	6,000
24 March 1913	Stoke (A)	2–0	Lee (2)	5,000
29 March 1913	Watford (A)	1–1	Hafekost	not recorded
5 April 1913	Merthyr Town (A)	0–0		not recorded
12 April 1913	Crystal Palace (A)	1–0	Church	10,000
19 April 1913	Plymouth Argyle (A)	0–4		9,000
26 April 1913	Southampton (A)	3–3	Hafekost, John, Frost	not recorded
30 April 1913	Plymouth Argyle (H)	4–2	John, Lee, Johnson (2, 2 pens.)	1,500

=== Partial league table ===
Southern League Division One final table, bottom positions
Pos	Team	Pld	W	D	L	GF	GA	GAv	Pts	Promotion or relegation
14	Watford	38	12	10	16	43	50	0.860	34	
15	Gillingham	38	12	10	16	36	53	0.679	34	
16	Bristol Rovers	38	12	9	17	55	64	0.859	33	
17	Southampton	38	10	11	17	40	72	0.556	31	
18	Norwich City	38	10	9	19	39	50	0.780	29	
19	Brentford	38	11	5	22	42	55	0.764	27	Relegated
20	Stoke	38	10	4	24	39	75	0.520	24	Relegated

== FA Cup ==
As a Southern League Division One team, Gillingham entered the 1912–13 FA Cup at the fourth qualifying round stage; they were due to play Leyton on 1 December but received a walkover as their opponents withdrew from the competition. In the fifth and final qualifying round, Gillingham played away to Spennymoor United of the North Eastern League. Gillingham reportedly offered a three-figure sum to their opponents to switch the match to Priestfield Road, but it was rejected. The match ended in a 1–1 draw, necessitating a replay, in which Wolstenholme scored twice and Taylor once in a 3–0 victory. In the first round proper, Gillingham played Barnsley of the Football League Second Division, who had won the previous season's FA Cup; the match drew a crowd of 11,321, the highest attendance recorded at Priestfield Road during the season. Gillingham had a number of goalscoring chances against the reigning cup-holders but were unable to convert them and the game ended in a goalless draw. In the replay at Oakwell, Barnsley took a two-goal lead in the early stages. Goffin reduced the arrears with a goal before half-time, but after the interval Barnsley scored again to secure a 3–1 victory and eliminate Gillingham from the competition; the correspondent for the Daily Mirror wrote that Barnsley were the better team throughout and that Gillingham's players tired late in the game.

=== Cup match details ===
- In the result column, Gillingham's score is shown first
- H = Home match
- A = Away match
- pen. = Penalty kick
- o.g. = Own goal

Results

Date	Round	Opponents	Result	Goalscorers	Attendance
14 December 1912	Fifth qualifying	Spennymoor United (A)	1–1	Wolstenholme	5,000
18 December 1912	Fifth qualifying (replay)	Spennymoor United (H)	3–0	Wolstenholme (2, 1 pen.), Taylor	1,600
11 January 1913	First	Barnsley (H)	0–0		11,321
16 January 1913	First (replay)	Barnsley (A)	1–3	Goffin	9,561

== Players ==
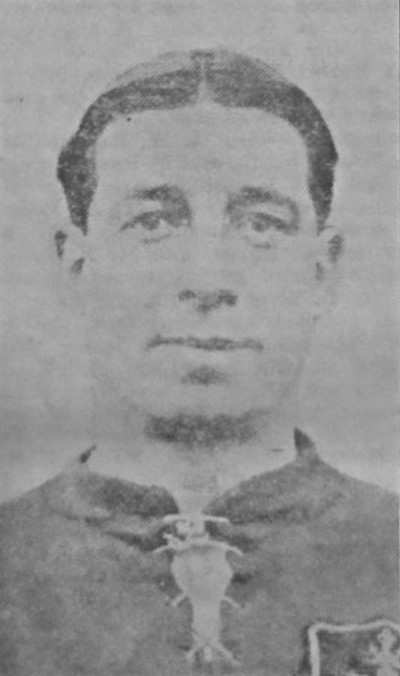
John Boden's five goals made him the joint highest scorer in league games.

Abel Lee made 26 appearances.

During the season, 20 players made at least one appearance for Gillingham. Andrew Mosley made the most, playing in every one of the team's 42 competitive games. Johnson missed only two games and Goffin only four. Peter Glen made the fewest appearances, playing only twice. Wolstenholme was the top goalscorer; he scored four times in the league and three in the FA Cup. Boden, Goffin, and Hafekost were joint top scorers in the league alone, with five each.

Player statistics
Player	Position	Southern League Division One		FA Cup		Total	
Player	Position	Apps	Goals	Apps	Goals	Apps	Goals
Albert Bailey	GK	26	0	0	0	26	0
Mark Bell	HB	28	0	4	0	32	0
John Boden	FW	16	5	4	0	20	5
Tom Caldwell	FW	30	2	4	0	34	2
A.G. Church	FW	9	1	0	0	9	1
Albert Court	FW	5	1	0	0	5	1
Harry Crane	GK	12	0	4	0	16	0
Charlie Frost	FW	10	2	0	0	10	2
Peter Glen	FW	2	0	0	0	2	0
Dick Goffin	FW	36	5	2	1	38	6
Charlie Hafekost	FW	22	5	2	0	24	5
Cornelius John	FW	12	2	0	0	12	0
Arthur Johnson	HB	36	3	4	0	40	3
Abel Lee	HB	22	3	4	0	26	3
Tom Leslie	FB	31	0	4	0	35	0
Tom Logan	FB	14	0	0	0	14	0
Jack Mahon	HB	29	0	0	0	29	0
Andrew Mosley	FB	38	0	4	0	42	0
Jock Taylor	FW	16	3	4	1	20	4
Arthur Wolstenholme	FW	24	4	4	3	28	7

FW = Forward, HB = Half-back, GK = Goalkeeper, FB = Full-back

== Aftermath ==
Prior to the next season, Gillingham opted to employ a full-time team manager, appointing the former Liverpool player Sam Gilligan as player-manager. In his first season in charge, the team finished 13th in the Southern League Division One.

The red and blue shirts proved short-lived and after the First World War the team reverted to wearing black and white stripes, before switching to all-blue shirts in the 1930s. In the 2012–13 season Gillingham wore a modern version of the red and blue shirts to mark the centenary of the club changing its name.
