= 1911–12 New Brompton F.C. season =

English football club season

New Brompton
1911–12 season
- Chairman: Edward Crawley
- Secretary: William Ironside Groombridge
- Southern League Division One: 18th
- FA Cup: Fourth qualifying round
- Top goalscorer: League: Fred Corbett, Abel Lee, Jock Taylor (6 each); All: Fred Corbett, Abel Lee, Jock Taylor (6 each)
- Highest home attendance: 7,000 vs Norwich City (6 April 1912)
- Lowest home attendance: 1,500 vs Exeter City (6 January 1912)
Home colours

During the 1911–12 English football season, New Brompton F.C. competed in the Southern League Division One. It was the 18th season in which the club competed in the Southern League and the 17th in Division One. The team lost their second game of the season 8–1 to Exeter City, and their results continued to be poor in the first half of the season; from the start of October until the end of December, they won only once in fourteen matches and scored only four goals. At the end of 1911, New Brompton were in 19th place out of 20 teams in the league table. The team suffered another heavy defeat in January, losing 7–1 to Brentford, and by late March had dropped to last place in the table. In their final eight matches of the season, however, they secured six victories and finished the campaign in 18th place, safe from relegation to Division Two. At the end of the season, the club changed its name to Gillingham F.C.

New Brompton also competed in the FA Cup, losing in the fourth qualifying round in a match which had to be replayed after being abandoned due to heavy rain. The team played 39 competitive matches, winning 11, drawing 9, and losing 19. Fred Corbett, Abel Lee, and Jock Taylor were the joint highest goalscorers, with six goals each. Jack Mahon made the most appearances, playing in every game. The highest attendance recorded at New Brompton's home ground, Priestfield Road, was 7,000 for the game against Norwich City in April.

== Background and pre-season ==
New Brompton, founded in 1893, had played in the Southern League since the competition's formation in 1894. At the time, only a small number of teams from the south of England had been elected into the ostensibly national Football League, with many of the south's leading teams playing in the Southern League. The 1911–12 season was the club's 17th season in Division One, the league's top division, following promotion from Division Two at the first attempt in 1895. In the preceding six seasons, New Brompton had only once finished in the top half of the league table, and in the 1910–11 season they had finished 18th, narrowly avoiding relegation back to Division Two.

As was often the case in the early 20th century, the club did not employ a full-time team manager; most tasks associated with a modern manager, such as the signing of new players, were among the responsibilities of the club's secretary, William Ironside Groombridge. J. Craddock was newly appointed to the position of team trainer. A number of players who had been regulars during the previous season left the club, and constraints caused by a significant financial loss over the course of the previous twelve months made it hard to recruit good-quality replacements. New Brompton signed two new half-backs, Abel Lee and Tom Kelly, both of whom had previously played for Grimsby Town. Forwards joining the club included Dick Goffin from Clapton Orient and Edward Whiteside, formerly of Norwich City. No new goalkeepers were signed, but it was anticipated that Albert Bailey, the goalkeeper for the club's reserve team during the previous season, would step up to the first team in place of Thomas Holmes, one of the departing players. The team wore New Brompton's usual black and white kit.

== Southern League Division One ==
=== September–December ===
Jock Taylor scored the only goal that New Brompton recorded in October.

The club's first match of the season was on 2 September at their own ground, Priestfield Road, against Luton Town; Kelly, Goffin, and Whiteside all made their debuts. Whiteside had several shots on goal for New Brompton but the match finished 0–0. New Brompton's first away game of the season came a week later against Exeter City. Exeter scored five goals in the first half and, although Whiteside scored New Brompton's first goal of the season after the interval, the final result was an 8–1 victory for Exeter. It was New Brompton's heaviest defeat since the opening day of the 1907–08 season. The Athletic News reported that New Brompton "were a very plucky side and never gave up trying", although the writer was critical of the performance of almost all their players. A week later, New Brompton achieved their first win of the season; goals from Lee and Goffin gave them a 2–1 victory at home to Brentford. On 23 September they lost 3–0 to Queens Park Rangers, beginning a run of 13 league games without a win. New Brompton's final game of September resulted in a 3–1 loss to Millwall; Whiteside scored the goal but would then be absent from the team for over a month and feature only intermittently for the remainder of the season.

During October, New Brompton played four matches and scored only one goal. The first two games of the month both ended in goalless draws, away to West Ham United and at home to Bristol Rovers. On 21 October, New Brompton played away to the previous season's Southern League champions, Swindon Town, and lost 5–0. The Athletic News wrote that New Brompton "worked hard but lacked ability". A week later, Jock Taylor scored New Brompton's first and only goal of the month, but his team lost 3–1 to Northampton Town at Priestfield Road; two of Northampton's goals were due to goalkeeping errors by Bailey. November began with another heavy defeat, as New Brompton were beaten 7–0 by Brighton & Hove Albion. On 11 November, the former Bristol Rovers forward Fred Corbett made his debut for New Brompton against Stoke. Although the Athletic News reported that he "did nothing out of the ordinary", he was a regular in the team for the rest of the season. After Stoke had taken the lead, Albert Court scored for New Brompton, only the third goal they had scored in the last eight games, to secure a draw. Stoke thought they had scored a winning goal late on but it was disallowed because a player had handled the ball. New Brompton's final match of November was a 2–0 defeat at home to Leyton, who had lost their preceding six games.

New Brompton again struggled to score goals in December, recording only two in seven matches. The month began with a 1–0 defeat away to another of the division's lowest-scoring teams, Norwich City; the margin of victory could have been greater but Norwich had two goals disallowed. A week later, Corbett scored his first goal for the team in a 1–1 draw at home to Crystal Palace. New Brompton lost 3–0 to Southampton on 16 December; the Athletic News, describing New Brompton's defence as "feeble", expressed surprise that Southampton failed to score more goals and opined that New Brompton were "heading straight for relegation". A week later, Plymouth Argyle won 1–0 at Priestfield Road; Taylor had a late chance to score an equaliser but his shot hit the goalpost. On Christmas Day, a goal from Lee gave New Brompton a 1–0 win over Reading at Priestfield Road, their first victory for more than three months. The Daily Telegraph reported that New Brompton would have won by a wider margin had it not been for the performance of Reading's goalkeeper. The two teams met again the following day at Elm Park, Reading's home ground; Reading dominated the game but it remained goalless until New Brompton conceded two late goals and lost 2–0. New Brompton's final game of 1911 was away to Luton Town, who took the lead in the first half and scored twice more in the second to win 3–0. The result meant that at the end of 1911, New Brompton were in 19th place in the Division One league table, above only Leyton.

=== January–April ===
Dick Goffin scored four goals in the second half of the season.

New Brompton's first game of 1912 was at home to Exeter City. The home team took a 3–0 lead in the first half; the Athletic News wrote that New Brompton "took a lot out of themselves by the fierceness of their onslaughts in the first half" and that in the second half Exeter began to dominate over their tiring opponents. Nonetheless, the final score was 4–1 to New Brompton; it meant that the team had scored as many goals in a single game as in the preceding 14 league matches combined. Albert Court scored two goals, the first time a New Brompton player had scored more than once in a game since December 1910. New Brompton's next game was away to Brentford; the home team scored four goals in the first half and went on to win 7–1. Goffin, back in the team for the first time since Christmas Day, scored New Brompton's only goal. A. Bell made his debut in goal in place of Bailey; the Athletic News reported that he could not be blamed for any of the seven goals and that he "saved several others in good style". New Brompton lost again a week later, being defeated 2–1 by Queens Park Rangers, and then began February with a 1–1 draw away to Millwall and a 3–0 defeat to West Ham United at Priestfield Road. At the conclusion of the game against West Ham, the referee had to be protected by police officers and club officials as New Brompton supporters, incensed that he had disallowed a goal for their team and allowed two contentious West Ham goals to stand, threw objects at him.

On 17 February, New Brompton won an away game for the first time during the season when a goal in the second half from Lee secured a 1–0 victory over Bristol Rovers. After a 3–2 defeat to Coventry City, New Brompton won 2–1 away to Northampton Town, the first time their opponents has lost on their own ground all season; despite the result New Brompton were in 20th and last place in the league table. Their next two games resulted in a goalless draw with Brighton & Hove Albion and a 2–0 defeat to Stoke. On 23 March, New Brompton played Coventry City at Priestfield Road. The visitors took a 2–0 lead in the first half; Goffin scored in the second half but New Brompton were then reduced to ten players when Andrew Mosley was injured.^{[a]} Despite the numerical disadvantage, New Brompton drew level when Lee scored. Coventry took the lead again but Jack Mahon scored in the final minute to secure a 3–3 draw for New Brompton in what the Athletic News called the most exciting game to have taken place at the ground all season; New Brompton remained in 20th place. Beginning on 30 March, New Brompton won four consecutive games; having scored only once in 14 previous games since joining the club, Corbett scored five goals in the four matches. The run began with a 2–0 victory over Leyton, which moved New Brompton above their opponents into 19th place.

During the Easter period, New Brompton won two games on consecutive days. On 5 April, a late goal from Corbett secured a 1–0 victory over Watford at Priestfield Road. Corbett scored twice the following day as New Brompton won 3–1 at home to Norwich City, whose players arrived late, delaying the start of the game by nearly 45 minutes. Two days later, New Brompton played Watford again and once again Corbett scored to give his team a 1–0 victory. The unbeaten run continued with a 1–1 draw with Crystal Palace. New Brompton beat Swindon Town 3–1 on 17 April, and three days later defeated Southampton 1–0 to ensure that they could not finish in the relegation positions. Their final game of the season was away to Plymouth Argyle; the team's eight-match unbeaten run ended with a 2–0 victory for Plymouth. The Athletic News described the game as one-sided and said that New Brompton were lucky not to have lost by a wider margin. The result meant that New Brompton ended the season in 18th place, level on points with Southampton and Bristol Rovers but below them based on goal average. Luton Town and Leyton, the two teams that finished below New Brompton, were relegated to Division Two; prior to the following season Leyton withdrew from the Southern League completely.

=== League match details ===
Key

- In the result column, New Brompton's score is shown first
- H = Home match
- A = Away match
- pen. = Penalty kick
- o.g. = Own goal

Results

Date	Opponents	Result	Goalscorers	Attendance
2 September 1911	Luton Town (H)	0–0		5,000
9 September 1911	Exeter City (A)	1–8	Whiteside	7,000
16 September 1911	Brentford (H)	2–1	Lee (pen.), Goffin	5,000
23 September 1911	Queens Park Rangers (A)	0–3		12,000
30 September 1911	Millwall (H)	1–3	Whiteside	4,000
7 October 1911	West Ham United (A)	0–0		6,000
14 October 1911	Bristol Rovers (H)	0–0		4,000
21 October 1911	Swindon Town (A)	0–5		not recorded
28 October 1911	Northampton Town (H)	1–3	Taylor	5,000
4 November 1911	Brighton & Hove Albion (A)	0–7		6,000
11 November 1911	Stoke (H)	1–1	Court	5,000
25 November 1911	Leyton (H)	0–2		3,000
2 December 1911	Norwich City (A)	0–1		5,000
9 December 1911	Crystal Palace (H)	1–1	Corbett	5,000
16 December 1911	Southampton (A)	0–3		not recorded
23 December 1911	Plymouth Argyle (H)	0–1		4,000
25 December 1911	Reading (H)	1–0	Lee	5,000
26 December 1911	Reading (A)	0–2		3,000
30 December 1911	Luton Town (A)	0–3		6,000
6 January 1912	Exeter City (H)	4–1	Court (2), John, Taylor	1,500
20 January 1912	Brentford (A)	1–7	Goffin	3,000
27 January 1912	Queens Park Rangers (H)	1–2	Lee (pen.)	4,000
3 February 1912	Millwall (A)	1–1	Taylor	10,000
10 February 1912	West Ham United (H)	0–3		5,000
17 February 1912	Bristol Rovers (A)	1–0	Lee	3,000
24 February 1912	Coventry City (A)	2–3	Goffin, John	5,000
2 March 1912	Northampton Town (A)	2–1	Taylor, John	4,000
9 March 1912	Brighton & Hove Albion (H)	0–0		5,000
16 March 1912	Stoke (A)	0–2		5,000
23 March 1912	Coventry City (H)	3–3	Goffin, Lee, Mahon	2,000
30 March 1912	Leyton (A)	2–0	Johnson, Corbett	3,000
5 April 1912	Watford (H)	1–0	Corbett	5,000
6 April 1912	Norwich City (H)	3–1	Corbett (2), Taylor	7,000
8 April 1912	Watford (A)	1–0	Corbett	7,000
13 April 1912	Crystal Palace (A)	1–1	Whiteside	7,000
17 April 1912	Swindon Town (H)	3–1	Whiteside, Taylor, Goffin	5,000
20 April 1912	Southampton (H)	1–0	Lee	6,000
27 April 1912	Plymouth Argyle (A)	0–2		9,000

=== Partial league table ===
Southern League Division One final table, bottom positions
Pos	Team	Pld	W	D	L	GF	GA	GAv	Pts	Promotion or relegation
16	Southampton	38	10	11	17	46	63	0.730	31	
17	Bristol Rovers	38	9	13	16	41	62	0.661	31	
18	New Brompton	38	11	9	18	35	72	0.486	31	
19	Luton Town	38	9	10	19	49	61	0.803	28	Relegated
20	Leyton	38	7	11	20	27	62	0.435	25	Resigned from the league

== FA Cup ==
As a Southern League Division One team, New Brompton entered the 1911–12 FA Cup in the fourth of the five qualifying rounds; their opponents were Croydon Common of the Southern League Division Two. New Brompton took a 2–0 lead but the referee abandoned the game due to heavy rainfall. The game was replayed four days later. New Brompton took the lead through A. Church but then conceded two goals and lost 2–1, meaning that they were eliminated from the competition.

=== Cup match details ===
- In the result column, New Brompton's score is shown first
- H = Home match
- A = Away match
- pen. = Penalty kick
- o.g. = Own goal

Results

Date	Round	Opponents	Result	Goalscorers	Attendance
18 November 1911	Fourth qualifying	Croydon Common (H)	2–0 (abandoned)	not recorded	not recorded
22 November 1911	Fourth qualifying	Croydon Common (H)	1–2	Church	not recorded

== Players ==
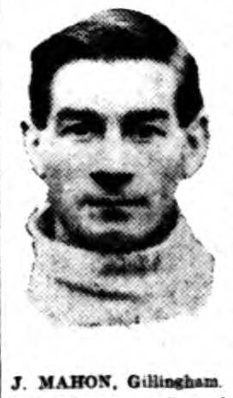
Jack Mahon played in every game during the season.

Abel Lee played in all but two of the team's matches and was the joint highest goalscorer.

During the season, 23 players made at least one appearance for New Brompton. Mahon made the most, playing in all 39 of the team's games. Mosley was absent for only one game, and Bailey, Lee, and Taylor missed only two matches. At the other end of the scale, Charlie Frost and C. Gudgeon played only once; in Gudgeon's case it was the only appearance he made for New Brompton's first team. Lee, Taylor, and Corbett were joint top goalscorers with six goals each. This was the lowest figure with which a player had ended the season as New Brompton's top scorer since the 1905–06 season.

Player statistics
Player	Position	Southern League Division One		FA Cup^{[b]}		Total	
Player	Position	Apps	Goals	Apps	Goals	Apps	Goals
Albert Bailey	GK	36	0	1	0	37	0
A. Bell	GK	2	0	0	0	2	0
A. Church	FW	6	0	1	1	7	1
Fred Corbett	FW	22	6	0	0	22	6
Albert Court	FW	28	3	1	0	29	3
E. Diddams	HB	5	0	0	0	5	0
Charlie Frost	FW	1	0	0	0	1	0
Dick Goffin	FW	31	5	0	0	31	5
C. Gudgeon	FW	1	0	0	0	1	0
John Hawkes	FB	17	0	0	0	17	0
Cornelius John	FW	16	3	0	0	16	3
Arthur Johnson	HB	17	1	0	0	17	1
Tom Kelly	HB	16	0	0	0	16	0
Abel Lee	HB	36	6	1	0	37	6
Jack Mahon	HB	38	1	1	0	39	1
George Massey	FW	11	0	1	0	12	0
Andrew Mosley	FB	37	0	1	0	38	0
Alfred Nobbs	FB	21	0	1	0	22	0
Tom Strang	HB	8	0	1	0	9	0
Jock Taylor	FW	36	6	1	0	37	6
Sidney Weavers	FW	10	0	0	0	10	0
Enoch Westwood	FW	4	0	1	0	5	0
Edward Whiteside	FW	19	4	0	0	19	4

FW = Forward, HB = Half-back, GK = Goalkeeper, FB = Full-back

== Aftermath ==
On 6 June, New Brompton's board of directors took the decision to change the club's name to Gillingham Football Club to reflect the fact that in the decades since the club's formation the previously small settlement of Gillingham had outgrown and absorbed New Brompton. The name change would not be formally approved by the shareholders until the following summer; nonetheless the team played under the new name in the 1912–13 season. Along with the new name, the club adopted a new kit featuring red shirts with blue sleeves, replacing the previous black and white stripes, and for the first time added the coat of arms of the borough to the shirts. Although the team's performance in the first season under the new name improved, they still finished in the bottom half of the league table and would continue to do so each season until competitive football was suspended in 1915 due to the First World War.

== Footnotes ==
a. The concept of substitutes was not introduced to English football until the 1960s; previously, if a player had to leave a game due to injury, the team had to continue with a reduced number of players.
b. The abandoned first match against Croydon Common is not included in players' statistics.
