= John Boden =

John or Jon Boden may refer to:

- John Boden (cricketer) (1848–1928), English cricketer
- John Boden (footballer) (1882–1946), English footballer
- Johnnie Boden (born 1961), English entrepreneur and founder of Boden, a catalogue clothing company
- Jon Boden (born 1977), English singer, composer and musician
- Jon Boden (rugby union) (born 1978), English rugby union player
