= Tom Kelly (footballer, born 1885) =

English footballer

Personal information
- Full name: Thomas Kelly
- Date of birth: 2 October 1885
- Place of birth: Tunstall, England
- Date of death: 9 April 1916 (aged 30)
- Place of death: near Kut, Ottoman Mesopotamia
- Position: Half back

Senior career*
Years	Team	Apps	(Gls)
- Denaby Main
1906	Glossop	23	(1)
- Denaby United
1908–1909	Grimsby Town	26	(3)
1911–1912	New Brompton	16	(0)
- Silverwood Town
- * Club domestic league appearances and goals

Thomas Kelly (2 October 1885 – 9 April 1916) was an English professional footballer who played in the Football League for Grimsby Town and Glossop as a half back.

== Personal life ==
Kelly was married with six children and predominantly lived in Stockport, working at the gasworks. On 3 March 1915, eight months after the outbreak of the First World War, Kelly and his brother enlisted in the North Staffordshire Regiment. On 9 April 1916, while holding the rank of private, Kelly was killed in an attack on Sannaiyat, Mesopotamia, during the Siege of Kut. He is commemorated on the Basra Memorial.

== Career statistics ==
Appearances and goals by club, season and competition
Club	Season	League			FA Cup		Total	
Club	Season	Division	Apps	Goals	Apps	Goals	Apps	Goals
New Brompton	1911–12	Southern League First Division	16	0	0	0	16	0
Career total			16	0	0	0	16	0
