= John Boden (cricketer) =

English cricketer

John George Boden (27 December 1848 – 3 January 1928) was an English first-class cricketer, who played one match for Yorkshire County Cricket Club against the Australian touring team at Bramall Lane, Sheffield in 1878.

Born in Birstall, near Batley, Yorkshire, Boden was a right hand batsman and wicket-keeper. He scored six runs in his only innings before being bowled by Allen. He also caught G. H. Bailey off the bowling of Yorkshire's Billy Bates for 23. Yorkshire won the match by nine wickets.

Boden also appeared for XX11 Colts v Marylebone Cricket Club (MCC) at Lord's in 1878. He was the founder of a decorating business and estate agency in Ilkley.

He died on 3 January 1928 in Ilkley, aged 79 years.
