= Bill Pepper =

English footballer

Personal information
- Full name: William George Pepper
- Date of birth: 1895
- Place of birth: Faversham, England
- Date of death: 25 October 1918 (aged 22–23)
- Place of death: north of Baghdad, Ottoman Iraq
- Position: Goalkeeper

Senior career*
Years	Team	Apps	(Gls)
- Sheppey United
1913	Leicester Fosse	1	(0)
1913	Gillingham	1	(0)
- * Club domestic league appearances and goals

William George Pepper (1895 – 25 October 1918) was an English professional footballer who played in the Football League for Leicester Fosse as a goalkeeper.

== Personal life ==
Pepper enlisted in the Queen's Own (Royal West Kent Regiment) during the First World War. He spent time with the regiment in India before being deployed to the Middle Eastern theatre in December 1917. Pepper was serving as an acting lance corporal when he was killed in Iraq during the Battle of Sharqat on 25 October 1918. He is commemorated on the Basra Memorial.

== Career statistics ==
Appearances and goals by club, season and competition
Club	Season	League			FA Cup		Total	
Club	Season	Division	Apps	Goals	Apps	Goals	Apps	Goals
Leicester Fosse	1912–13	Second Division	1	0	0	0	1	0
Gillingham	1913–14	Southern League First Division	1	0	0	0	1	0
Career total			2	0	0	0	2	0
