= Jack Branfield =

English footballer

Branfield pictured on a cigarette card

Jack Branfield (born 25 October 1891) was an English footballer who played as a goalkeeper. He played professionally for Gillingham, making over 50 appearances, and was in goal for the club's first ever match in the Football League in 1920.
