= Jock Taylor (footballer, born 1885) =

Scottish footballer (1885–1916)

Personal information
- Full name: John Taylor
- Date of birth: 12 December 1885
- Place of birth: Elgin, Scotland
- Date of death: 15 September 1916 (aged 30)
- Place of death: Somme, France
- Position: Inside right

Senior career*
| Years | Team | Apps | (Gls) |
| –1907 | Parkhead | | |
| 1908–1909 | Hull City | 9 | (3) |
| 1909 | Tunbridge Wells Rangers | | |
| 1909–1913 | Gillingham | 123 | (37) |
| 1910 | → Leith Athletic (loan) | 3 | (0) |
| 1913–1914 | Distillery | | |
| 1914–1915 | Leith Athletic | 27 | (20) |
| 1915–1916 | St Bernard's | | |
- * Club domestic league appearances and goals

John Taylor (12 December 1885 – 15 September 1916) was a Scottish professional footballer who made over 120 Southern League appearances as a inside right for Gillingham. He also played in the Scottish League for Leith Athletic and in the Football League for Hull City.

== Personal life ==
Taylor served as a private in the Royal Scots during the First World War and was killed on the Somme on 15 September 1916. He is commemorated on the Thiepval Memorial.

== Career statistics ==
Appearances and goals by club, season and competition
| Club | Season | League | | | National Cup | | Other | | Total | |
| Club | Season | Division | Apps | Goals | Apps | Goals | Apps | Goals | Apps | Goals |
|---|---|---|---|---|---|---|---|---|---|---|
| Hull City | 1907–08 | Second Division | 1 | 0 | 0 | 0 | — | | 1 | 0 |
| Hull City | 1908–09 | Second Division | 8 | 3 | 0 | 0 | — | | 8 | 3 |
| Hull City | Total | | 9 | 3 | 0 | 0 | — | | 9 | 3 |
| Gillingham | 1909–10 | Southern League First Division | 34 | 19 | 5 | 1 | — | | 39 | 20 |
| Gillingham | 1910–11 | Southern League First Division | 37 | 9 | 4 | 6 | — | | 41 | 15 |
| Gillingham | 1911–12 | Southern League First Division | 36 | 6 | 1 | 0 | — | | 37 | 6 |
| Gillingham | 1912–13 | Southern League First Division | 16 | 3 | 4 | 1 | — | | 20 | 4 |
| Gillingham | Total | | 123 | 37 | 14 | 8 | — | | 137 | 45 |
| Leith Athletic (loan) | 1910–11 | Scottish League Second Division | 3 | 0 | — | | — | | 3 | 0 |
| Leith Athletic | 1914–15 | Scottish League Second Division | 27 | 20 | — | | 1 (Note: Appearance in Scottish Qualifying Cup) | 0 | 28 | 20 |
| Leith Athletic | Total | | 30 | 20 | — | | 1 | 0 | 31 | 20 |
| Career total | | | 162 | 60 | 14 | 8 | 1 | 0 | 171 | 68 |
