= John Boden (footballer) =

English footballer

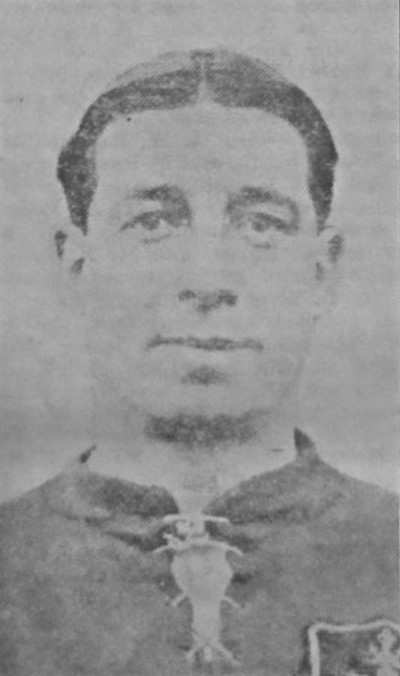
- Boden in Gillingham colours in 1912

Personal information
- Full name: John William Boden
- Date of birth: q1 1882
- Place of birth: Northwich, England
- Date of death: 19 March 1946 (aged about 64)
- Place of death: Northwich, England
- Positions: Defender; half back; centre forward

Senior career*
Years	Team	Apps	(Gls)
1902–1905	Glossop	91	(4)
1905–1906	Clapton Orient	27	(5)
1906–1907	Aston Villa	17	(2)
1907	Northwich Victoria		
1907–1909	Reading	65	(6)
1909–1910	Croydon Common	20	(2)
1910–1912	Plymouth Argyle	65	(32)
1912–1913	Gillingham	16	(5)
- * Club domestic league appearances and goals

John William Boden (q1 1882 – 19 March 1946) was an English professional footballer who played in the Football League for Glossop, Clapton Orient and Aston Villa in the 1900s. He appeared in Clapton Orient's first Football League match in 1905. A defender or half back, he later played for Northwich Victoria before moving into the Southern League to play for Reading, Croydon Common, Plymouth Argyle, and Gillingham. Boden died in his native Northwich, Cheshire, in 1946 aged about 64.
