= Charlie Hafekost =

English footballer (1890–1967)

Personal information
- Full name: Charles Henry Hafekost
- Date of birth: 22 March 1890
- Place of birth: Sunderland, England
- Date of death: 1967 (aged 77)
- Place of death: South Shields, England
- Height: 5 ft 11 in (1.80 m)
- Position: Forward

Senior career*
| Years | Team | Apps | (Gls) |
| 19??–1912 | Sunderland Royal Rovers | | |
| 1912–1914 | Gillingham | 51 | (15) |
| 1914–1919 | Liverpool | 1 | (0) |
| 1919 | Sunderland | 1 | (0) |
| 1919 | Darlington Forge Albion | | |
| 1919 | Hamilton Academical | 3 | (0) |
| 1919–1920 | Hartlepools United | 14 | (2) |
- * Club domestic league appearances and goals

Charles Henry Hafekost (22 March 1890 – 1967), was an English professional footballer during the early years of the twentieth century. He played in the Football League for Liverpool and in the Scottish League for Hamilton Academical. Before joining Liverpool, he spent two seasons in the Southern League with Gillingham and also played North-Eastern League football for Sunderland Royal Rovers and Hartlepools United.

== Life and career ==
Hafekost was born in Sunderland in 1890. By the 1909–10 season, he was playing football for Sunderland Royal Rovers of the North-Eastern League. In 1912, he signed for Gillingham. He spent two seasons with the club and scored 15 goals in 51 Southern League appearances. In his second season, he finished as top scorer and helped them reach the second round of the 1913–14 FA Cup, in which they faced Liverpool of the Football League First Division. The Liverpool Echo's preview described Hafekost as "Quite the artist in his manipulation of the ball. Full of trickery and artifice." Liverpool won 2–0, but the goals came late in the game, and the Daily Citizen wrote that "had Pinkney and Hafekost been accurate at close quarters the game would have gone to Kent." Nevertheless, Hafekost impressed enough for Liverpool's manager, Tom Watson, to sign him at the end of the season.

Hafekost played for Liverpool's reserve team, but made only one appearance in the Football League, which came against Middlesbrough on 14 November 1914. He took the place of Tom Miller, who was unavailable following the death of his mother, and the Echo's "Bee" thought it "a surprise selection in view of other names on the books". The match was drawn, and the same reporter highlighted what he perceived as the player's problem: "Hafekost did many genteel things, showing his nice idea of football. He passes well when he is placed badly, but a lack of robustness is plain in his case." He finished the season with a winner's medal in the Liverpool Senior Cup.

When League football was abandoned for the duration of the First World War, Hafekost remained in the Liverpool area where he had work. He signed up for Liverpool's wartime league team, and also played for Tranmere Rovers, before returning to his native north east of England where he appeared for his former club Sunderland Rovers as well as for Sunderland Albion and Newcastle United. In 1917, he moved again, this time to Belfast where he worked in Workman, Clark and Company's shipyard and was given permission by the Football Association to play for Distillery. After the war, he appeared for both Sunderland and Darlington Forge Albion in the Northern Victory League.

Ahead of the 1919–20 Scottish Football League season, Hafekost joined First Division club Hamilton Academical, where he was known by the nickname Harry. He made his debut on 16 August 1919 in a 2–0 defeat away to St Mirren, and played in the next two matches, one of which was a 2–1 loss at home to Celtic. He left the club in mid-September by mutual consent for health reasons. He signed for Hartlepools United of the North-Eastern League a month later, and went on to score twice from 14 North-Eastern League matches and appear once in the FA Cup.

Hafekost died in 1967. His death was registered in South Shields in the last quarter of that year.
