= Dick Goffin =

English footballer

Personal information
- Full name: Richard Francis Arthur Goffin
- Date of birth: 15 February 1886
- Place of birth: Bow, London, England
- Date of death: 1973 (aged 86–87)
- Position: Inside forward

Senior career*
Years	Team	Apps	(Gls)
1905–1906	Eton Mission		
1906–1910	Peel Institute		
1907–1911	Clapton Orient	65	(12)
1911–1914	New Brompton	80	(13)
1919	Uxbridge		
Total		145	(25)
- * Club domestic league appearances and goals

Richard Francis Arthur Goffin (15 February 1886–1973) was an English footballer who played in the Football League for Clapton Orient.
