= Ernie Pinkney =

Scottish-born English footballer

- Pinkney pictured in 1910

Personal information
- Full name: Ernest Pinkney
- Date of birth: 23 November 1887
- Place of birth: Hutchesontown, Glasgow, Scotland
- Date of death: 1975 (aged 87)
- Place of death: Liverpool, England
- Height: 5 ft 8 1/2 in (1.74 m)
- Position: Outside forward

Senior career*
Years	Team	Apps	(Gls)
1908–1909	West Hartlepool Expansion		
1909–1912	Everton	8	(1)
1912–1913	Barrow		
1913–1915	Gillingham	63	(13)
- Liverpool (wartime guest)
????–1921	Tranmere Rovers		
1921–1922	Halifax Town	30	(2)
1922–????	Accrington Stanley	12	(3)
- * Club domestic league appearances and goals

Ernest Pinkney (23 November 1887 – 1975) was an English professional association football player either side of the First World War.

Pinkney was born in Glasgow to English parents from Yorkshire. The family moved back to England when he was still young. As a child he was uninterested in football, but at the age of 17 he began playing for a local team in West Hartlepool called Baptists United and scored 39 goals in his first season. He subsequently joined Christ Church of the Hartlepool & District League, before moving to West Hartlepool Expansion of the Wearside League. There he attracted the attention of scouts from Everton, with whom he signed a professional contract.

After a series of good performances for the reserve team, Pinkney made his Football League debut on 28 March 1910 against Bury when several regular starters were rested ahead of an important FA Cup match; he provided an assist for Everton's third goal in a 3–0 win, scored by Jimmy Gourlay. Although Pinkney was slightly built, the Athletic News wrote in September 1910 that he could be the player to replace the recently retired Jack Sharp, saying that Pinkney "seems likely to develop into the man needed by the club. He is speedy and determined, and shows a credible command of the ball." He made four appearances during the 1909–10 season. The following season, he again played four times and scored his only Football League goal for the club, the second in a 2–0 win over Preston North End on 7 January 1911.

In August 1912, having not played at all for the Everton first team during the preceding season, Pinkney joined Barrow of the Lancashire Combination. A year later, he moved to Gillingham of the Southern League. He made his debut in a 2–0 defeat to Coventry City on 3 September 1913 and scored his first goal eight days later against the same opponents. In his first season with the club he played 38 games and scored nine goals, making him the team's joint second-highest goalscorer for the season. He was again a regular the following season, but in 1915 competitive football was abandoned due to the escalation of the First World War.

Pinkney appeared as a wartime guest player for Liverpool; the Liverpool Echo wrote in January 1916 that he had been a dependable player and "given much pleasure to Liverpool followers". When competitive football resumed, he played for Tranmere Rovers of the Lancashire Combination, although his appearances were restricted by a knee injury. In 1921 he returned to the Football League for the first time in nearly ten years when he joined Halifax Town, who had been chosen to be among the founder members of the new Third Division North. He finished his Football League career with Accrington Stanley, where he made 12 league appearances and scored three goals, including one in a 4–1 win over Ashington in December 1922.
