= Tom Leslie =

Scottish footballer (1884–1961)

Personal information
- Full name: Thomas Scott Leslie
- Date of birth: 26 February 1884
- Place of birth: Tollcross, Scotland
- Date of death: 27 August 1961 (aged 77)
- Place of death: Enfield, England
- Position: Defender

Senior career*
Years	Team	Apps	(Gls)
- Vale of Clyde
1908–1911	Tottenham Hotspur	10	(0)
1911–1912	Leyton		
1912–1920	Gillingham	142	(7)
1916	→ Clyde (guest)	5	(0)
- Caerphilly
- * Club domestic league appearances and goals

Thomas Scott Leslie (26 February 1884 – 27 August 1961) was a Scottish footballer who played for Vale of Clyde, Tottenham Hotspur, Leyton, Gillingham, Clyde and Caerphilly.

== Career ==
Leslie began his playing career at Vale of Clyde before joining Tottenham Hotspur in May 1908. He was signed as cover for Jabez Darnell and didn't make his debut until 10 October 1908 in an away league match against Brentford which finished in a 1–1 draw. The defender was mainly in the Tottenham reserves and only played a total of 12 matches for Tottenham between 1908 and 1911 He went on to make appearances at Leyton, Gillingham, Clyde (on a short loan during World War I, during which the Scottish Football League continued) and finally Caerphilly.

== Works cited ==
- Soar, Phil (1995). Tottenham Hotspur The Official Illustrated History 1882–1995. Hamlyn. ISBN 0-600-58706-1.
- Goodwin, Bob (1992). The Spurs Alphabet. ACL & Polar Publishing (UK) Ltd. ISBN 0-9514862-8-4.
