= Arthur Johnson (footballer, born 1886) =

English footballer

Personal information
- Date of birth: 1886
- Place of birth: Grays, England
- Position: Half-back

Senior career*
Years	Team	Apps	(Gls)
- Southend United
1907–1908	Sheffield United	2	(0)
- Southend United
1909–1915	New Brompton	132	(5)

Managerial career
- Grays Thurrock United
- * Club domestic league appearances and goals

Arthur J. Johnson (born 1886) was an English footballer active prior to the First World War.

A half-back, Johnson's earliest known club was Southend United, then playing in the Southern League. He had a spell with Sheffield United of The Football League, but only made two appearances for the "Blades". He then returned to Southend before joining another Southern League club, New Brompton, making his debut against Watford on 25 December 1909. He remained with the club until competitive football was abandoned in 1915 due to the escalation of the First World War, finishing with a total of 132 Southern League appearances and five goals.

He served as secretary-manager of Grays Thurrock United in the mid-1920s.
