= Abel Lee =

English footballer

Personal information
- Date of birth: 1884
- Place of birth: Staveley, Derbyshire
- Date of death: 1929 (aged 44–45)
- Position: Right half

Senior career*
Years	Team	Apps	(Gls)
- Wombwell Rising Star
- Darfield United
1906–1911	Grimsby Town	86	(0)
1911–1920	New Brompton/Gillingham	150	(15)
- * Club domestic league appearances and goals

Abel Lee (born Abel Evans, 1884–1929) was an English professional football right half who played in the Football League for Grimsby Town and in the Southern League for New Brompton/Gillingham.

== Career ==
Born in Staveley, Derbyshire, he played for minor teams Wombwell Rising Star and Darfield United

Lee joined Football League club Grimsby Town in 1906. Lee was made club captain from 1908 through to 1911. He played 86 times for the club.

Lee joined New Brompton of the Southern League in 1911. He remained with the club, later renamed Gillingham, until 1920 and made over 150 appearances. In 1920 Gillingham gained election to the Football League and replaced most of their existing squad with new players. Lee, by now a veteran at around 36 years old, was one of those who left the club, and it is unknown if he went on to play anywhere else.
