= Jack Mahon (footballer, born 1886) =

English footballer (1886–?)

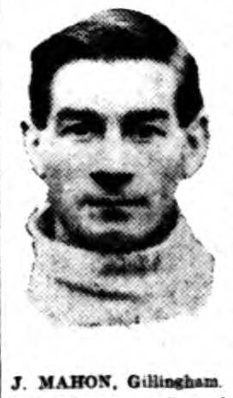

Personal information
- Full name: John Mahon
- Date of birth: 1886
- Place of birth: Northwich, England
- Position: Half back

Youth career
- Clowne Whitestar

Senior career*
Years	Team	Apps	(Gls)
–1908	Worksop Town		
1908–1909	Gainsborough Trinity		
1909–1920	New Brompton/Gillingham		
1920–1921	Doncaster Rovers		(3)
- * Club domestic league appearances and goals

John Mahon (1886 – ?) was an English professional footballer who played as a half back.

After playing for minor teams Clowne White Star and Worksop Town he joined Football League club Gainsborough Trinity in 1908. He played 22 times for the club before joining New Brompton in 1909. He remained with the club, later renamed Gillingham, until 1920 and made over 250 appearances. He also gained the club's first ever representative honour when he played for a Southern League XI against an equivalent team from The Football League in 1910.

In 1920, he left Gillingham to join Doncaster Rovers where he played in their first game in their return to football following WW1, in the 2–1 defeat to Rotherham Town in the Midland League. He scored 3 goals during that season, 2 of them as penalties.

His son, also called Jack Mahon, played professionally, notably for Leeds United and West Bromwich Albion in the 1930s.
