= Andrew Mosley =

English footballer

Personal information
- Full name: Andrew Mosley
- Date of birth: 1885
- Place of birth: Sneinton, England
- Date of death: 3 August 1917 (aged 31–32)
- Place of death: West Flanders, Belgium
- Position: Right back

Senior career*
Years	Team	Apps	(Gls)
- Sneinton
1906–1909	Notts County	11	(0)
1910–1915	New Brompton/Gillingham^{[a]}	167	(0)
- * Club domestic league appearances and goals

Andrew Mosley (1885 – 3 August 1917) was an English professional footballer who made over 160 appearances in the Southern League for Gillingham as a right back. He also played in the Football League for Notts County.

== Personal life ==
Mosley worked as a bricklayer and was married with a child. He served as a private with the Royal Engineers and the South Wales Borderers during the First World War and was killed in West Flanders on 3 August 1917. He is commemorated on the Menin Gate.

== Career statistics ==
Appearances and goals by club, season and competition
Club	Season	League			FA Cup		Total	
Club	Season	Division	Apps	Goals	Apps	Goals	Apps	Goals
New Brompton/Gillingham^{[a]}	1910–11	Southern League First Division	22	0	1	0	23	0
New Brompton/Gillingham^{[a]}	1911–12	Southern League First Division	37	0	1	0	38	0
New Brompton/Gillingham^{[a]}	1912–13	Southern League First Division	38	0	4	0	42	0
New Brompton/Gillingham^{[a]}	1913–14	Southern League First Division	36	0	4	0	40	0
New Brompton/Gillingham^{[a]}	1914–15	Southern League First Division	34	0	1	0	35	0
Career total			167	0	11	0	178	0

== Notes ==
a. The club changed its name in 1912.
