= 1986–87 Brentford F.C. season =

English football team season

Brentford
1986–87 season
- Chairman: Martin Lange
- Manager: Frank McLintock (until 24 January 1987); Steve Perryman (from 25 January 1987)
- Stadium: Griffin Park
- Third Division: 11th
- FA Cup: Second round
- League Cup: First round
- Football League Trophy: Quarter-final
- Top goalscorer: League: Cooke (20); All: Cooke (25)
- Highest home attendance: 7,443
- Lowest home attendance: 1,110
- Average home league attendance: 3,918
Home colours	Away colours

During the 1986–87 English football season, Brentford competed in the Football League Third Division. Frank McLintock resigned as manager in January 1987 and his replacement Steve Perryman saved the club's season, elevating the Bees to an 11th-place finish.

== Season summary ==
It was all change at Griffin Park during the 1986 off-season. Assistant manager John Docherty left the club to become manager of Millwall and took long-serving defender Danis Salman with him, for a "ridiculous" £20,000 fee which was settled by tribunal. Manager Frank McLintock released midfielders Terry Bullivant, Tony Lynch, George Torrance and forwards Rowan Alexander and Steve Butler. Wimbledon winger Ian Holloway's loan was made permanent for a £28,000 fee and also arriving at Griffin Park were defender Phil Bater, midfielder Paul Maddy and forward Gary Stevens. The marquee signing of Chelsea winger Paul Canoville was set to be decided by tribunal, but fell through after Reading won the day with a £60,000 bid.

A poor start to the season led manager Frank McLintock to continue to act in the transfer market during the opening months. £35,000 midfielder Wayne Turner was installed as the new captain, Tony Obi arrived on loan and Henry Hughton and Robbie Carroll joined on non-contract terms. Brentford continued to tread water in the lower reaches of mid-table through November and December 1986 and McLintock attempted to remedy the situation by signing experienced defenders Steve Perryman and Micky Droy. By January 1987, the Brentford supporters were calling for the sacking of McLintock and after a 4–1 defeat to Port Vale on 24 January, the club's board announced that his contract would not be renewed at the end of the season. McLintock immediately left the club.

After Frank McLintock's departure, player Steve Perryman was announced as caretaker manager. An immediate turnaround in the team's form led the board, who had reportedly shown interest in Wimbledon's Dave Bassett, to appoint Perryman to the role on a permanent basis in late-February 1987. He made two important additions to the club's staff, appointing Phil Holder as assistant manager and signing forward Gary Blissett for a £60,000 fee from Crewe Alexandra. Perryman lost just five of his first 23 games in the job and steered Brentford to an 11th-place finish.

== League table ==
Pos	Team	Pld	W	D	L	GF	GA	GD	Pts
9	Blackpool	46	16	16	14	74	59	+15	64
10	Mansfield Town	46	15	16	15	52	55	−3	61
11	Brentford	46	15	15	16	64	66	−2	60
12	Port Vale	46	15	12	19	76	70	+6	57
13	Doncaster Rovers	46	14	15	17	56	62	−6	57

== Results ==
Brentford's goal tally listed first.

=== Legend ===
Win	Draw	Loss

=== Pre-season and friendlies ===
Date	Opponent	Venue	Result	Attendance	Scorer(s)
29 July 1986	Ashford Town (Middlesex)	A	5–0	n/a	F. Joseph, Maddy, Allen, untraced (og)
2 August 1986	Baldock Town	A	1–1	n/a	Bater
5 August 1986	West Ham United	H	1–2	1,970	F. Joseph
9 August 1986	Oxford United	H	1–2	1,144	Maddy
13 August 1986	Queens Park Rangers	H	0–1	2,245	
16 August 1986	Orient	A	1–1	540	Stevens
28 October 1986	Arsenal XI	H	6–3	412	F. Joseph (2), Carroll, og (2)
15 May 1987	Queens Park Rangers	H	2–3	7,049	Bowles, og

=== Football League Third Division ===
No.	Date	Opponent	Venue	Result	Attendance	Scorer(s)
1	23 August 1986	Bournemouth	H	1–1	3,856	Cooke (pen)
2	30 August 1986	Doncaster Rovers	A	0–2	1,675	
3	6 September 1986	Port Vale	H	0–2	3,150	
4	13 September 1986	Fulham	A	3–1	4,820	Stevens, Cooke, R. Joseph
5	16 September 1986	Carlisle United	A	0–0	2,904	
6	20 September 1986	Darlington	H	5–3	3,265	Stevens (2), Bater, Cooke (pen)
7	27 September 1986	Gillingham	A	0–2	4,710	
8	30 September 1986	Bury	H	0–2	3,238	
9	4 October 1986	Newport County	H	2–0	3,231	Sinton, Maddy
10	11 October 1986	Mansfield Town	A	0–1	3,456	
11	18 October 1986	York City	H	3–1	3,457	Cooke, Stevens (2)
12	25 October 1986	Walsall	A	2–5	4,495	Cooke, Millen
13	1 November 1986	Bolton Wanderers	H	1–2	3,522	Maddy
14	4 November 1986	Notts County	H	1–0	3,057	Carroll
15	8 November 1986	Chester City	A	1–1	2,055	Cooke
16	22 November 1986	Blackpool	H	1–1	4,471	Stevens
17	30 November 1986	Rotherham United	A	3–2	3,148	Sinton, Cooke (2)
18	13 December 1986	Wigan Athletic	A	1–1	2,411	Cooke
19	21 December 1986	Middlesbrough	H	0–1	5,504	
20	26 December 1986	Swindon Town	A	0–2	8,086	
21	28 December 1986	Bristol Rovers	H	1–2	4,500	Cooke
22	1 January 1987	Chesterfield	H	2–2	3,622	Cooke, Bater
23	3 January 1987	Blackpool	A	0–2	4,384	
24	10 January 1987	Bournemouth	A	1–1	4,682	Millen
25	24 January 1987	Port Vale	A	1–4	3,062	Cooke
26	1 February 1987	Fulham	H	3–3	5,340	Stevens, Sinton, Bates
27	7 February 1987	Carlisle United	H	3–1	3,032	Maddy, F. Joseph, Wright (og)
28	15 February 1987	Darlington	A	1–1	2,303	Droy
29	21 February 1987	Gillingham	H	3–2	4,015	Maddy, Stevens, Cooke
30	28 February 1987	Bury	A	1–1	2,317	Stevens
31	3 March 1987	Bolton Wanderers	A	2–0	3,465	Stevens, Cooke (pen)
32	7 March 1987	Walsall	H	0–1	3,442	
33	14 March 1987	York City	A	1–2	2,426	Cooke
34	17 March 1987	Bristol City	H	1–1	4,051	Maddy
35	21 March 1987	Mansfield Town	H	3–1	3,336	Carroll (2), Cooke
36	4 April 1987	Chester City	H	3–1	3,496	Droy (2), Blissett (pen)
37	7 April 1987	Newport County	A	2–2	1,596	Nogan, Blissett
38	11 April 1987	Notts County	A	1–1	4,358	Priest
39	14 April 1987	Doncaster Rovers	H	1–1	3,426	Blissett
40	18 April 1987	Chesterfield	A	2–1	2,116	Cooke, Williamson (og)
41	20 April 1987	Swindon Town	H	1–1	7,443	Cooke
42	25 April 1987	Middlesbrough	A	0–2	9,942	
43	28 April 1987	Bristol City	A	2–0	9,050	Carroll, Blissett
44	2 May 1987	Rotherham United	H	2–0	3,425	Cooke, Nogan
45	4 May 1987	Bristol Rovers	A	1–0	3,513	Sinton
46	9 May 1987	Wigan Athletic	H	2–3	4,235	Sinton, Blissett (pen)

=== FA Cup ===
Round	Date	Opponent	Venue	Result	Attendance	Scorer
1R	3 December 1986	Bristol Rovers	A	0–0	3,035	
1R (replay)	6 December 1986	Bristol Rovers	H	2–0	3,848	Stevens (2)
2R	9 December 1986	Cardiff City	A	0–2	2,531	

=== Football League Cup ===
Round	Date	Opponent	Venue	Result	Attendance	Scorer(s)
1R (1st leg)	26 August 1986	Southend United	A	0–1	1,539	
1R (2nd leg)	2 September 1986	Southend United	H	2–3 (lost 2–4 on aggregate)	2,632	F. Joseph, Cooke

=== Football League Trophy ===
Round	Date	Opponent	Venue	Result	Attendance	Scorer(s)
SPR (match 1)	15 December 1986	Orient	A	5–1	749	Cooke (4), Geddis
SPR (match 2)	6 January 1987	Swindon Town	H	4–2	1,110	Stevens, Sinton (2), Carroll
SR1	26 January 1987	Walsall	H	4–2	1,774	F. Joseph (2), Stevens, Maddy
SQF	10 February 1987	Bristol City	A	0–3	7,425	

- Sources: 100 Years of Brentford, The Big Brentford Book of the Eighties, Statto

== Playing squad ==
Players' ages are as of the opening day of the 1986–87 season.

Pos.	Name	Nat.	Date of birth (age)	Signed from	Signed in	Notes
Goalkeepers
GK	Richard Key	(England)	13 April 1956 (aged 30)	Swindon Town	1985	
GK	Gary Phillips	(England)	20 September 1961 (aged 24)	Barnet	1984	
GK	John Power	(England)	10 December 1959 (aged 26)	Kingstonian	1987	On loan from Kingstonian
Defenders
DF	Phil Bater	(Wales)	26 October 1955 (aged 30)	Bristol Rovers	1986	
DF	Jamie Bates	(England)	24 February 1968 (aged 18)	Youth	1986	
DF	Micky Droy	(England)	7 May 1951 (aged 35)	Crystal Palace	1986	
DF	Terry Evans	(England)	12 April 1965 (aged 21)	Hillingdon	1985	
DF	Roger Joseph	(England)	24 December 1965 (aged 20)	Southall	1984	
DF	Keith Millen	(England)	26 September 1966 (aged 19)	Youth	1985	
DF	Jamie Murray	(Scotland)	27 December 1958 (aged 27)	Cambridge United	1984	
DF	Steve Perryman	(England)	21 December 1951 (aged 34)	Oxford United	1986	Manager
Midfielders
MF	Bob Booker	(England)	25 January 1958 (aged 28)	Bedmond Sports & Social	1978	
MF	Robbie Carroll	(England)	15 February 1968 (aged 18)	Gosport Borough	1986	
MF	Ian Holloway	(England)	12 March 1963 (aged 23)	Wimbledon	1986	Loaned to Torquay United
MF	Paul Maddy	(Wales)	17 August 1962 (aged 24)	Hereford United	1986	
MF	Andy Sinton	(England)	19 March 1966 (aged 20)	Cambridge United	1985	
MF	Wayne Turner (c)	(England)	9 March 1961 (aged 25)	Coventry City	1986	
Forwards
FW	Gary Blissett	(England)	29 May 1964 (aged 22)	Crewe Alexandra	1987	
FW	Robbie Cooke	(England)	16 February 1957 (aged 29)	Cambridge United	1984	
FW	Francis Joseph	(England)	6 March 1960 (aged 26)	Wimbledon	1982	Loaned to Wimbledon
FW	Lee Nogan	(Wales)	21 May 1969 (aged 17)	Oxford United	1987	On loan from Oxford United
Players who left the club mid-season
DF	Henry Hughton	(Republic of Ireland)	18 November 1959 (aged 26)	Crystal Palace	1986	Released
DF	Steve Wignall	(England)	17 September 1954 (aged 31)	Colchester United	1984	Transferred to Aldershot
MF	Paul Merson	(England)	20 March 1968 (aged 18)	Arsenal	1987	Returned to Arsenal after loan
MF	Tony Obi	(England)	15 September 1965 (aged 20)	Oxford United	1986	Returned to Oxford United after loan
MF	Philip Priest	(England)	6 September 1966 (aged 19)	Chelsea	1987	Returned to Chelsea after loan
FW	David Geddis	(England)	12 May 1958 (aged 28)	Birmingham City	1986	Returned to Birmingham City after loan
FW	Gary Stevens	(England)	3 August 1954 (aged 32)	Shrewsbury Town	1986	Transferred to Hereford United

- Sources: The Big Brentford Book of the Eighties, Timeless Bees

== Coaching staff ==
=== Frank McLintock (23 August 1986 – 24 January 1987) ===
Name	Role
(Scotland) Frank McLintock	Manager
(England) Steve Perryman	Assistant Manager
(Republic of Ireland) Terry Mancini	Coach
(England) Ron Woolnough	Physiotherapist
(England) Sammy Chung	Chief Scout

=== Steve Perryman (24 January – 9 May 1987) ===
Name	Role
(England) Steve Perryman	Player-Manager
(England) Phil Holder	Assistant Manager

== Statistics ==
=== Appearances and goals ===
Substitute appearances in brackets.

Pos	Nat	Name	League		FA Cup		League Cup		FL Trophy		Total	
Pos	Nat	Name	Apps	Goals	Apps	Goals	Apps	Goals	Apps	Goals	Apps	Goals
GK	(England)	Richard Key	0	0	0	0	0	0	1	0	1	0
GK	(England)	Gary Phillips	44	0	3	0	2	0	3	0	52	0
DF	(Wales)	Phil Bater	19	2	3	0	1 (1)	0	1	0	24 (1)	2
DF	(England)	Jamie Bates	20 (4)	1	0	0	0	0	3	0	23 (4)	1
DF	(England)	Micky Droy	19	3	3	0	—		2	0	24	3
DF	(England)	Terry Evans	1	0	0	0	0	0	1	0	2	0
DF	(Republic of Ireland)	Henry Hughton	5 (3)	0	0 (2)	0	—		1	0	6 (5)	0
DF	(England)	Roger Joseph	32	1	0 (1)	0	2	0	3	0	37 (1)	1
DF	(England)	Keith Millen	39	2	3	0	2	0	1 (1)	0	45 (1)	2
DF	(Scotland)	Jamie Murray	39	0	3	0	1	0	4	0	47	0
DF	(England)	Steve Perryman	23 (1)	0	3	0	—		0	0	26 (1)	0
DF	(England)	Steve Wignall	3	0	—		2	0	—		5	0
MF	(England)	Bob Booker	2	0	0	0	2	0	0	0	4	0
MF	(England)	Robbie Carroll	16 (6)	4	1	0	—		2 (1)	1	19 (7)	5
MF	(England)	Ian Holloway	13 (3)	0	3	0	2	0	0 (1)	0	18 (4)	0
MF	(Wales)	Paul Maddy	29 (2)	5	2	0	2	0	3	1	36 (2)	6
MF	(England)	Andy Sinton	46	5	3	0	2	0	4	2	55	7
MF	(England)	Wayne Turner	32	0	0	0	—		4	0	36	0
FW	(England)	Gary Blissett	10	5	—		—		—		10	5
FW	(England)	Robbie Cooke	40	20	3	0	1 (1)	1	2 (1)	4	46 (2)	25
FW	(England)	Francis Joseph	10 (3)	1	0	0	2	1	3	2	15 (3)	4
FW	(England)	Gary Stevens	29 (3)	10	3	2	1 (1)	0	4	2	37 (4)	14
Players loaned in during the season
GK	(England)	John Power	2	0	—		—		—		2	0
MF	(England)	Paul Merson	6 (1)	0	—		—		1 (1)	0	7 (2)	0
MF	(England)	Tony Obi	10	0	—		—		—		10	0
MF	(England)	Philip Priest	3 (2)	1	—		—		—		3 (2)	1
FW	(England)	David Geddis	4	0	—		—		1	1	5	1
FW	(Wales)	Lee Nogan	10 (1)	2	—		—		—		10 (1)	2

- Players listed in italics left the club mid-season.
- Source: The Big Brentford Book of the Eighties

=== Goalscorers ===
Pos.	Nat	Player	FL3	FAC	FLC	FLT	Total
FW	(England)	Robbie Cooke	20	0	1	4	25
FW	(England)	Gary Stevens	10	2	0	2	14
MF	(England)	Andy Sinton	5	0	0	2	7
MF	(Wales)	Paul Maddy	5	0	0	1	6
FW	(England)	Gary Blissett	5	—	—	—	5
MF	(England)	Robbie Carroll	4	0	—	1	5
FW	(England)	Francis Joseph	1	0	1	2	4
DF	(England)	Micky Droy	3	0	—	0	3
FW	(Wales)	Lee Nogan	2	—	—	—	2
DF	(Wales)	Phil Bater	2	0	0	0	2
DF	(England)	Keith Millen	2	0	0	0	2
MF	(England)	Philip Priest	1	—	—	—	1
DF	(England)	Jamie Bates	1	0	0	0	1
DF	(England)	Roger Joseph	1	0	0	0	1
FW	(England)	David Geddis	0	—	—	1	1
Opponents			2	0	0	0	2
Total			64	2	2	13	81

- Players listed in italics left the club mid-season.
- Source: The Big Brentford Book of the Eighties

=== Management ===
Name	Nat	From	To	Record All Comps					Record League				
Name	Nat	From	To	P	W	D	L	W %	P	W	D	L	W %
Frank McLintock	(Scotland)	23 August 1986	24 January 1987	32	9	8	15	28.13	25	6	7	12	24.00
Steve Perryman	(England)	26 January 1987	9 May 1987	23	10	8	5	43.48	21	9	8	4	42.86

=== Summary ===
Games played	55 (46 Third Division, 3 FA Cup, 2 League Cup, 4 Football League Trophy)
Games won	19 (15 Third Division, 1 FA Cup, 0 League Cup, 3 Football League Trophy)
Games drawn	16 (15 Third Division, 1 FA Cup, 0 League Cup, 0 Football League Trophy)
Games lost	20 (16 Third Division, 1 FA Cup, 2 League Cup, 1 Football League Trophy)
Goals scored	81 (64 Third Division, 2 FA Cup, 2 League Cup, 13 Football League Trophy)
Goals conceded	80 (66 Third Division, 2 FA Cup, 4 League Cup, 8 Football League Trophy)
Clean sheets	9 (7 Third Division, 2 FA Cup, 0 League Cup, 0 Football League Trophy)
Biggest league win	2–0 on two occasions; 3–1 on five occasions; 5–3 versus Darlington, 20 September 1986
Worst league defeat	4–1 versus Port Vale, 24 January 1987; 5–2 versus Walsall, 25 October 1986
Most appearances	55, Andy Sinton (46 Third Division, 3 FA Cup, 2 League Cup, 4 Football League Trophy)
Top scorer (league)	20, Robbie Cooke
Top scorer (all competitions)	25, Robbie Cooke

== Transfers & loans ==
Players transferred in
Date	Pos.	Name	Previous club	Fee	Ref.
26 June 1986	DF	(Wales) Phil Bater	(England) Bristol Rovers	Free	
July 1986	MF	(England) Ian Holloway	(England) Wimbledon	£28,000	
July 1986	MF	(Wales) Paul Maddy	(England) Hereford United	£5,000	
July 1986	FW	(England) Gary Stevens	(England) Shrewsbury Town	Free	
September 1986	MF	(England) Robbie Carroll	(England) Gosport Borough	Non-contract	
September 1986	DF	(Republic of Ireland) Henry Hughton	(England) Crystal Palace	Non-contract	
September 1986	MF	(England) Wayne Turner	(England) Coventry City	£35,000	
November 1986	DF	(England) Micky Droy	(England) Crystal Palace	Free	
November 1986	DF	(England) Steve Perryman	(England) Oxford United	n/a	
March 1987	FW	(England) Gary Blissett	(England) Crewe Alexandra	£60,000	
Players loaned in
Date from	Pos.	Name	From	Date to	Ref.
28 August 1986	MF	(England) Tony Obi	(England) Oxford United	October 1986	
November 1986	FW	(England) David Geddis	(England) Birmingham City	December 1986	
January 1987	MF	(England) Paul Merson	(England) Arsenal	March 1987	
March 1987	FW	(Wales) Lee Nogan	(England) Oxford United	End of season	
March 1987	MF	(England) Philip Priest	(England) Chelsea	n/a	
April 1987	GK	(England) John Power	(England) Kingstonian	End of season	
Players transferred out
Date	Pos.	Name	Subsequent club	Fee	Ref.
11 August 1986	DF	(England) Danis Salman	(England) Millwall	£20,000	
September 1986	DF	(England) Steve Wignall	(England) Aldershot	£8,000	
March 1987	FW	(England) Gary Stevens	(England) Hereford United	£5,000	
Players loaned out
Date from	Pos.	Name	To	Date to	Ref.
February 1987	MF	(England) Ian Holloway	(England) Torquay United	March 1987	
March 1987	FW	(England) Francis Joseph	(England) Wimbledon	n/a	
1987	FW	(England) Francis Joseph	(Finland) HJK Helsinki	July 1987	
Players released
Date	Pos.	Name	Subsequent club	Join date	Ref.
December 1986	DF	(Republic of Ireland) Henry Hughton	(England) Orient	December 1986	
May 1987	DF	(England) Micky Droy	Retired		
May 1987	GK	(England) Richard Key	(England) Millwall	December 1987	

== Awards ==
- Supporters' Player of the Year: Andy Sinton
- Players' Player of the Year: Gary Phillips
