= 1984–85 Brentford F.C. season =

English football team season

Brentford
1984–85 season
- Chairman: Martin Lange
- Manager: Frank McLintock
- Stadium: Griffin Park
- Third Division: 13th
- FA Cup: Third round
- League Cup: Second round
- Football League Trophy: Runners-up
- Top goalscorer: League: Cassells, Cooke (12); All: Cassells, G. Roberts (18)
- Highest home attendance: 8,214
- Lowest home attendance: 2,003
- Average home league attendance: 4,074
Home colours	Away colours

During the 1984–85 English football season, Brentford competed in the Football League Third Division. The season is best remembered for the club's first appearance in a Football League Trophy final, which was lost 3–1 to Wigan Athletic.

== Season summary ==
Frank McLintock prepared for his first full season as Brentford manager by trimming his squad, releasing goalkeeper Paddy Roche, defenders Jim McNichol, Ian Bolton, Graham Wilkins and forward Tony Mahoney. His only significant signings were left back Jamie Murray from Cambridge United for £27,500 and centre back Steve Wignall from Colchester United for a £18,000 fee.

Manager McLintock presided over a season of transition in the Third Division, treading water in mid-table through to the end of 1984 and then dropping further in the early months of 1985. The goals of £20,000 signing Robbie Cooke allayed any fears that the club would be sucked into a relegation battle for the second successive season. The Bees repeated the previous season's feats in the League Cup and FA Cup, reaching the second and third rounds respectively. McLintock gave teenage defenders Keith Millen and Roger Joseph their debuts late in the season and both of whom would go on to become key players for the club. Brentford finished in 13th place in the Third Division.

Brentford's 1984–85 season is chiefly remembered for the club's run to the final of the Football League Trophy. The competition had been established in the 1982–83 season as the Football League Group Cup, but by 1984–85 the tournament had gained prestige, with sponsorship from Freight Rover and Wembley Stadium was announced as the venue for the final. The Bees won six matches in a row to reach the final, scoring 17 goals and conceding just three. The final was reached after an emphatic 6–0 Southern Area Final win over Newport County at Griffin Park, in which winger Gary Roberts scored four goals in a four-minute spell either side of half-time. The final versus Wigan Athletic at Wembley Stadium on 1 June 1985 was Brentford's first appearance at the ground since the 1942 London War Cup final. A disappointing defensive performance led to a 3–1 defeat, with Robbie Cooke scoring what proved to be the consolation goal.

Two club records were set or equalled during the season:

- Most Football League games without a clean sheet: 20 (29 September 1984 – 26 January 1985)
- Fastest hattrick (all competitions): 3 minutes – Gary Roberts (versus Newport County, Football League Trophy Southern Area final, 17 May 1985)

== League table ==
Pos	Team	Pld	W	D	L	GF	GA	GD	Pts
11	Walsall	46	18	13	15	58	52	+6	67
12	Rotherham United	46	18	11	17	55	55	0	65
13	Brentford	46	16	14	16	62	64	−2	62
14	Doncaster Rovers	46	17	8	21	72	74	−2	59
15	Plymouth Argyle	46	15	14	17	62	65	−3	59

== Results ==
Brentford's goal tally listed first.

=== Legend ===
Win	Draw	Loss

=== Pre-season ===
Date	Opponent	Venue	Result	Attendance	Scorer(s)
1 August 1984	Wembley	A	1–1	n/a	Hurlock
4 August 1984	West Ham United	H	1–0	2,109	Cassells
7 August 1984	Baldock Town	A	1–2	n/a	Myers
11 August 1984	Tottenham Hotspur	H	0–3	3,612	
15 August 1984	Chelsea	H	0–3	2,775	
20 August 1984	Luton Town	H	0–2	893	

=== Football League Third Division ===
No.	Date	Opponent	Venue	Result	Attendance	Scorer(s)
1	25 August 1984	Orient	H	0–1	4,171	
2	1 September 1984	Walsall	A	1–0	4,747	Booker
3	8 September 1984	Wigan Athletic	H	2–0	3,724	Cassells, Salman
4	18 September 1984	Rotherham United	A	1–1	3,644	Hurlock
5	22 September 1984	Swansea City	H	3–0	4,298	Hurlock, Cassells (2)
6	29 September 1984	Cambridge United	A	2–1	2,580	Kamara, Cassells
7	2 October 1984	Doncaster Rovers	H	1–1	4,901	Harle (og)
8	6 October 1984	Bradford City	H	0–1	4,196	
9	13 October 1984	Millwall	A	0–2	5,385	
10	20 October 1984	Gillingham	H	5–2	4,053	G. Roberts (3), Alexander, Cassells
11	23 October 1984	Burnley	A	1–3	2,916	Malley (og)
12	27 October 1984	York City	H	2–1	4,261	Salman, G. Roberts
13	3 November 1984	Bristol City	A	1–1	7,674	Kamara
14	7 November 1984	Derby County	A	0–1	10,530	
15	10 November 1984	Lincoln City	H	2–2	4,115	Cassells, Booker
16	24 November 1984	Bournemouth	A	0–1	4,113	
17	27 November 1984	Newport County	A	0–2	1,589	
18	1 December 1984	Bolton Wanderers	H	2–1	3,668	Cassells, Kamara
19	15 December 1984	Preston North End	A	1–1	2,818	G. Roberts
20	22 December 1984	Hull City	A	0–4	6,354	
21	26 December 1984	Bristol Rovers	H	0–3	5,254	
22	29 December 1984	Reading	H	2–1	5,161	Booker, Richardson (og)
23	1 January 1985	Plymouth Argyle	A	1–1	6,926	Alexander
24	19 January 1985	Wigan Athletic	A	1–1	3,358	Cooke
25	26 January 1985	Newport County	H	2–5	3,962	Kamara (pen), Cooke
26	2 February 1985	Cambridge United	H	2–0	3,254	Cooke, Torrance
27	9 February 1985	Swansea City	A	2–3	4,440	Kamara, Cooke
28	16 February 1985	Doncaster Rovers	A	2–2	3,129	Cooke, Salman
29	23 February 1985	Bristol City	H	1–2	4,526	Booker
30	2 March 1985	York City	A	0–1	4,288	
31	5 March 1985	Burnley	H	2–1	3,267	Cooke, Butler
32	9 March 1985	Gillingham	A	0–2	5,799	
33	23 March 1985	Bradford City	A	4–5	6,038	Cooke (3), Booker
34	27 March 1985	Walsall	H	3–1	3,021	G. Roberts, Hurlock, Cooke
35	30 March 1985	Derby County	H	1–1	4,423	G. Roberts
36	6 April 1985	Bristol Rovers	A	0–3	4,419	
37	8 April 1985	Plymouth Argyle	H	3–1	4,043	Cassells (2, 1 pen), G. Roberts
38	13 April 1985	Lincoln City	A	1–1	1,980	Cooke
39	16 April 1985	Orient	A	1–0	3,164	Booker
40	20 April 1985	Bournemouth	H	0–0	3,559	
41	23 April 1985	Rotherham United	H	3–0	3,019	G. Roberts (2), Cassells
42	27 April 1985	Bolton Wanderers	A	1–1	4,230	Kamara
43	4 May 1985	Preston North End	H	3–1	3,476	Booker, G. Roberts, Cooke
44	6 May 1985	Reading	A	0–0	3,898	
45	11 May 1985	Hull City	H	2–1	4,309	Skipper (og), Cassells (pen)
46	19 May 1985	Millwall	H	1–1	5,050	Cassells

=== FA Cup ===
Round	Date	Opponent	Venue	Result	Attendance	Scorer(s)
1R	17 November 1984	Bishop's Stortford	H	4–0	3,948	Alexander (2), Cassells (2)
2R	8 December 1984	Northampton Town	H	2–2	4,449	Alexander, Cassells (pen)
2R (replay)	17 December 1984	Northampton Town	A	2–0	3,610	Hurlock, Cassells
3R	5 January 1985	Oldham Athletic	A	1–2	4,163	Kamara

=== Football League Cup ===
Round	Date	Opponent	Venue	Result	Attendance	Scorer(s)
1R (1st leg)	28 August 1984	Cambridge United	H	2–0	3,037	G. Roberts (2)
1R (2nd leg)	4 September 1984	Cambridge United	A	0–1 (won 2–1 on aggregate)	2,347	
2R (1st leg)	26 September 1984	Leicester City	A	2–4	7,638	Alexander, Kamara
2R (2nd leg)	9 October 1984	Leicester City	H	0–2 (lost 6–2 on aggregate)	6,291	

=== Football League Trophy ===
Round	Date	Opponent	Venue	Result	Attendance	Scorer(s)	Notes
SR1 (1st leg)	6 February 1985	Reading	A	3–1	2,500	Torrance (2), P. Roberts	
SR1 (2nd leg)	26 February 1985	Reading	H	2–0 (won 5–1 on aggregate)	2,011	Wignall, G. Roberts	
SR2	19 March 1985	Cambridge United	H	1–0	2,003	Cooke	
SQF	11 April 1985	Swansea City	A	2–0	1,653	Booker (2)	
SSF	30 April 1985	Bournemouth	A	3–2	4,657	Cooke (2), Kamara	
SF	17 May 1985	Newport County	H	6–0	8,214	Cassells (2, 1 pen), G. Roberts (4)	
F	1 June 1985	Wigan Athletic	N	1–3	39,897	Cooke	(Note: Match played at Wembley Stadium, London.)

- Sources: 100 Years of Brentford, The Big Brentford Book of the Eighties, Statto

== Playing squad ==
Players' ages are as of the opening day of the 1984–85 season.

Pos.	Name	Nat.	Date of birth (age)	Signed from	Signed in	Notes
Goalkeepers
GK	Gary Phillips	(England)	20 September 1961 (aged 22)	Barnet	1984	
GK	Trevor Swinburne	(England)	20 June 1953 (aged 31)	Carlisle United	1983	
Defenders
DF	Bobby Fisher	(England)	3 August 1956 (aged 28)	Cambridge United	1984	
DF	Roger Joseph	(England)	24 December 1965 (aged 18)	Southall	1984	
DF	Keith Millen	(England)	26 September 1966 (aged 17)	Youth	1985	
DF	Jamie Murray	(Scotland)	27 December 1958 (aged 25)	Cambridge United	1984	
DF	Paul Roberts	(England)	27 April 1962 (aged 22)	Millwall	1983	
DF	Danis Salman	(England)	12 March 1960 (aged 24)	Youth	1975	
DF	Steve Wignall	(England)	17 September 1954 (aged 29)	Colchester United	1984	
Midfielders
MF	Bob Booker	(England)	25 January 1958 (aged 26)	Bedmond Sports & Social	1978	
MF	Terry Bullivant	(England)	23 September 1956 (aged 27)	Charlton Athletic	1983	
MF	Terry Hurlock (c)	(England)	22 November 1958 (aged 25)	Leytonstone/Ilford	1980	
MF	Chris Kamara	(England)	25 December 1957 (aged 26)	Portsmouth	1981	
MF	Tony Lynch	(England)	20 January 1966 (aged 18)	Youth	1983	
MF	Gary Roberts	(Wales)	5 April 1960 (aged 24)	Wembley	1980	
MF	George Torrance	(Scotland)	17 September 1957 (aged 26)	Wokingham Town	1984	
Forwards
FW	Rowan Alexander	(Scotland)	28 January 1961 (aged 23)	St Mirren	1984	
FW	Steve Butler	(England)	27 January 1962 (aged 22)	Windsor & Eton	1984	
FW	Keith Cassells	(England)	10 July 1957 (aged 27)	Southampton	1983	
FW	Robbie Cooke	(England)	16 February 1957 (aged 27)	Cambridge United	1984	Loaned from Cambridge United before transferring permanently
FW	Francis Joseph	(England)	6 March 1960 (aged 24)	Wimbledon	1982	
Players who left the club mid-season
GK	Richard Key	(England)	13 April 1956 (aged 28)	Orient	1984	Released
MF	Tommy Finney	(Northern Ireland)	6 November 1952 (aged 31)	Cambridge United	1984	Released
MF	Terry Rowe	(England)	8 June 1964 (aged 20)	Youth	1982	Released

- Sources: The Big Brentford Book of the Eighties, Timeless Bees

== Coaching staff ==
Name	Role
(Scotland) Frank McLintock	Manager
(Scotland) John Docherty	Assistant Manager
(England) Ron Woolnough	Physiotherapist
(England) Ted Davies	Chief Scout

== Statistics ==
=== Appearances and goals ===
Substitute appearances in brackets.

Pos	Nat	Name	League		FA Cup		League Cup		FL Trophy		Total	
Pos	Nat	Name	Apps	Goals	Apps	Goals	Apps	Goals	Apps	Goals	Apps	Goals
GK	(England)	Richard Key	1	0	—		—		—		1	0
GK	(England)	Gary Phillips	21	0	0	0	0	0	7	0	28	0
GK	(England)	Trevor Swinburne	24	0	4	0	4	0	0	0	32	0
DF	(England)	Bobby Fisher	27 (1)	0	3	0	4	0	2	0	36 (1)	0
DF	(England)	Roger Joseph	1	0	0	0	0	0	0	0	1	0
DF	(England)	Keith Millen	16 (1)	0	0	0	0	0	5	0	21 (1)	0
DF	(Scotland)	Jamie Murray	46	0	4	0	4	0	7	0	61	0
DF	(England)	Paul Roberts	27 (1)	0	3	0	4	0	1 (1)	1	35 (2)	1
DF	(England)	Danis Salman	43	3	4	0	4	0	7	0	58	3
DF	(England)	Steve Wignall	36	0	3	0	2	0	6	1	47	1
MF	(England)	Bob Booker	35 (3)	7	2 (1)	0	2	0	6	2	45 (4)	9
MF	(England)	Terry Bullivant	5	0	0	0	0	0	3 (2)	0	8 (2)	0
MF	(Northern Ireland)	Tommy Finney	5	0	1	0	2	0	—		8	0
MF	(England)	Terry Hurlock	40	3	4	1	4	0	6	0	54	4
MF	(England)	Chris Kamara	38 (1)	6	4	1	4	1	6	1	52 (1)	9
MF	(England)	Tony Lynch	5 (5)	0	0	0	0 (1)	0	2	0	7 (6)	0
MF	(Wales)	Gary Roberts	39	11	4	0	4	2	5 (1)	5	52 (1)	18
MF	(England)	Terry Rowe	1	0	—		0	0	—		1	0
MF	(Scotland)	George Torrance	11 (2)	1	1	0	—		1 (2)	2	13 (4)	3
FW	(Scotland)	Rowan Alexander	17 (2)	2	3	3	2	1	0 (1)	0	22 (3)	6
FW	(England)	Steve Butler	3	1	0	0	—		1	0	4	1
FW	(England)	Keith Cassells	38 (2)	12	4	4	2	0	5	2	49 (2)	18
FW	(England)	Robbie Cooke	24	12	—		—		7	4	31	16
FW	(England)	Francis Joseph	3	0	0	0	2	0	0	0	5	0

- Players listed in italics left the club mid-season.
- Source: The Big Brentford Book of the Eighties

=== Goalscorers ===
Pos.	Nat	Player	FL3	FAC	FLC	FLT	Total
FW	(England)	Keith Cassells	12	4	0	2	18
MF	(Wales)	Gary Roberts	11	0	2	5	18
FW	(England)	Robbie Cooke	12	—	—	4	16
MF	(England)	Bob Booker	7	0	0	2	9
MF	(England)	Chris Kamara	6	1	1	1	9
FW	(Scotland)	Rowan Alexander	2	3	1	0	6
MF	(England)	Terry Hurlock	3	1	0	0	4
DF	(England)	Danis Salman	3	0	0	0	3
MF	(Scotland)	George Torrance	1	0	—	2	3
FW	(England)	Steve Butler	1	0	—	0	1
DF	(England)	Paul Roberts	0	0	0	1	1
DF	(England)	Steve Wignall	0	0	0	1	1
Opponents			4	0	0	0	4
Total			62	9	4	18	93

- Players listed in italics left the club mid-season.
- Source: The Big Brentford Book of the Eighties

=== Management ===
Name	Nat	From	To	Record All Comps					Record League				
Name	Nat	From	To	P	W	D	L	W %	P	W	D	L	W %
Frank McLintock	(Scotland)	25 August 1984	1 June 1985	61	25	15	21	40.98	46	16	14	16	34.78

=== Summary ===
Games played	61 (46 Third Division, 4 FA Cup, 4 League Cup, 7 Football League Trophy)
Games won	25 (16 Third Division, 2 FA Cup, 1 League Cup, 6 Football League Trophy)
Games drawn	15 (14 Third Division, 1 FA Cup, 0 League Cup, 0 Football League Trophy)
Games lost	21 (16 Third Division, 1 FA Cup, 3 League Cup, 1 Football League Trophy)
Goals scored	93 (62 Third Division, 9 FA Cup, 4 League Cup, 18 Football League Trophy)
Goals conceded	81 (64 Third Division, 4 FA Cup, 7 League Cup, 6 Football League Trophy)
Clean sheets	15 (8 Third Division, 2 FA Cup, 1 League Cup, 4 Football League Trophy)
Biggest league win	3–0 on two occasions; 5–2 versus Gillingham, 20 October 1984
Worst league defeat	4–0 versus Hull City, 22 December 1984
Most appearances	61, Jamie Murray (46 Third Division, 4 FA Cup, 4 League Cup, 7 Football League Trophy)
Top scorer (league)	12, Keith Cassells, Robbie Cooke
Top scorer (all competitions)	18, Keith Cassells, Gary Roberts

== Transfers & loans ==
Players transferred in
Date	Pos.	Name	Previous club	Fee	Ref.
July 1984	DF	(England) Jamie Murray	(England) Cambridge United	£27,500	
August 1984	DF	(England) Roger Joseph	(England) Southall	Trial	
August 1984	GK	(England) Richard Key	(England) Orient	n/a	
August 1984	DF	(England) Steve Wignall	(England) Colchester United	£18,000	
September 1984	GK	(Scotland) Rowan Alexander	(Scotland) St Mirren	£25,000	
December 1984	FW	(England) Steve Butler	(England) Windsor & Eton	n/a	
December 1984	GK	(England) Gary Phillips	(England) Barnet	£4,000	
December 1984	MF	(Scotland) George Torrance	(England) Wokingham Town	n/a	
March 1985	FW	(England) Robbie Cooke	(England) Cambridge United	£20,000	
April 1985	DF	(England) Jamie Bates	(England) Crystal Palace	n/a	
Players loaned in
Date from	Pos.	Name	From	Date to	Ref.
January 1985	FW	(England) Robbie Cooke	(England) Cambridge United	March 1985	
Players loaned out
Date from	Pos.	Name	To	Date to	Ref.
December 1984	DF	(England) Tony Spencer	(England) Aldershot	March 1985	
Players released
Date	Pos.	Name	Subsequent club	Join date	Ref.
July 1984	DF	(England) Ian Bolton	(England) Barnet	July 1984	
September 1984	GK	(England) Richard Key	(England) Sunderland	October 1984	
October 1984	DF	(England) Terry Rowe	(United States) Wichita Wings	1984	
December 1984	MF	(Northern Ireland) Tommy Finney	(England) Cambridge United	December 1984	
April 1985	DF	(England) Tony Spencer	Retired		
May 1985	MF	(England) Terry Bullivant	Retired		
May 1985	DF	(England) Paul Roberts	n/a		
May 1985	GK	(England) Trevor Swinburne	(England) Leeds United	June 1985	

== Awards ==
- Supporters' Player of the Year: Danis Salman
- Players' Player of the Year: Danis Salman
