= 1985–86 Brentford F.C. season =

English football team season

Brentford
1985–86 season
- Chairman: Martin Lange
- Manager: Frank McLintock
- Stadium: Griffin Park
- Third Division: 10th
- FA Cup: First round
- League Cup: Second round
- Football League Trophy: First round
- Top goalscorer: League: Cooke (17); All: Cooke (18)
- Highest home attendance: 6,351
- Lowest home attendance: 2,512
- Average home league attendance: 3,957
Home colours	Away colours

During the 1985–86 English football season, Brentford competed in the Football League Third Division. Inferior home form and a number of key player departures meant that the Bees could finish no higher than 10th position.

== Season summary ==
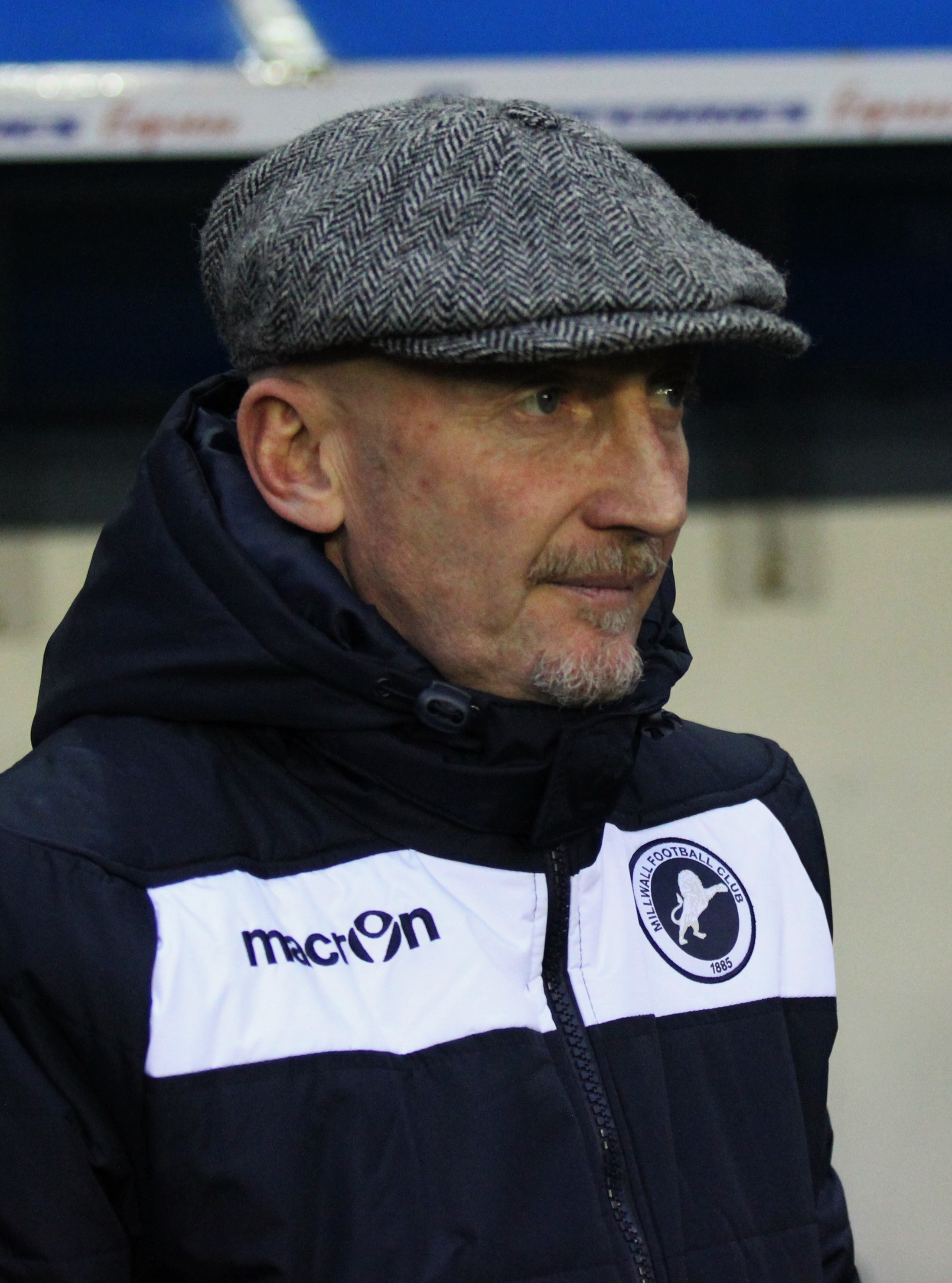
Wimbledon winger Ian Holloway was signed on loan late in the season to invigorate the attack.

After the recent Heysel Stadium disaster and the Bradford City stadium fire, the financial implications of the work needed to bring Griffin Park up to standard hampered Brentford manager Frank McLintock's movement in the transfer market during the 1985 off-season. The core of the previous season's Football League Trophy final team would be sold off, with midfielder Chris Kamara and forward Keith Cassells leaving before the beginning of the season and captain Terry Hurlock would later be sold for a club-record £95,000 fee in February 1986. Goalkeeper Trevor Swinburne and defender Paul Roberts were released and the mid-season retirement of goalscoring winger Gary Roberts also compounded the break-up of the team. McLintock re-signed bit-part goalkeeper Richard Key and midfielder Terry Bullivant on free transfers and also brought in 20-year-old centre back Terry Evans from non-league Hillingdon, a transfer which would go on to be an important contributor the club's success in the early 1990s.

The 1985–86 season proved to be one of consolidation in the Third Division for Brentford, with the team briefly challenging for promotion in August and for a three-month period in late 1985, but otherwise being rooted in mid-table. There was little cheer to be had in the cup competitions, but manager Frank McLintock was able to make some incoming mid-season transfers, bringing in midfielder Andy Sinton for a £25,000 fee and loaning wingers Steve Burke and Ian Holloway from Queens Park Rangers and Wimbledon respectively. Forward Francis Joseph, top scorer during the 1982–83 season, returned from a long injury layoff in April 1986 and boosting the attack, which had been led alone by Robbie Cooke. Brentford finished the season in 10th place, with an away record superior to that of at Griffin Park.

== League table ==
Pos	Team	Pld	W	D	L	GF	GA	GD	Pts
8	Notts County	46	19	14	13	71	60	+11	71
9	Bristol City	46	18	14	14	69	60	+9	68
10	Brentford	46	18	12	16	58	61	−3	66
11	Doncaster Rovers	46	16	16	14	45	52	−7	64
12	Blackpool	46	17	12	17	66	55	+11	63

== Results ==
Brentford's goal tally listed first.

=== Legend ===
Win	Draw	Loss

=== Pre-season and friendlies ===
Date	Opponent	Venue	Result	Attendance	Scorer(s)
27 July 1985	Wembley	A	0–0	n/a	
30 July 1985	Wokingham Town	A	2–1	n/a	Hurlock, Cooke
7 August 1985	Southampton	H	1–0	962	Butler
10 August 1985	Oxford United	H	4–2	1,480	Hurlock, Cooke, Lynch, Evans
9 May 1986	Tottenham Hotspur	H	4–3	2,129	Cassells, Holloway, F. Joseph, Roberts

=== Football League Third Division ===
No.	Date	Opponent	Venue	Result	Attendance	Scorer(s)
1	17 August 1985	Wolverhampton Wanderers	H	2–1	5,576	Bullivant, Murray
2	24 August 1985	Bristol Rovers	A	1–0	4,140	Lynch
3	26 August 1985	Bournemouth	H	1–0	4,283	Cooke
4	31 August 1985	Wigan Athletic	A	0–4	2,871	
5	7 September 1985	Plymouth Argyle	H	1–1	3,927	Lynch
6	13 September 1985	Doncaster Rovers	A	0–1	2,831	
7	17 September 1985	Reading	H	1–2	6,351	Booker
8	21 September 1985	Lincoln City	A	0–3	1,856	
9	28 September 1985	Rotherham United	H	1–1	3,257	Alexander
10	1 October 1985	Darlington	A	5–3	2,447	Alexander (3), Booker, Lynch
11	5 October 1985	Swansea City	H	1–0	3,508	Lynch
12	12 October 1985	Bolton Wanderers	A	2–1	4,106	Wignall, Cooke
13	19 October 1985	Newport County	H	0–0	3,646	
14	22 October 1985	Walsall	A	2–1	4,318	Wignall, Hurlock
15	26 October 1985	Blackpool	A	0–4	5,448	
16	2 November 1985	Cardiff City	H	3–0	3,934	Hurlock, Cooke, Lynch
17	6 November 1985	Derby County	H	3–3	4,707	Murray, Cooke, Butler
18	9 November 1985	Bristol City	A	0–0	6,598	
19	23 November 1985	Chesterfield	H	1–0	3,502	Roberts
20	30 November 1985	York City	A	0–1	3,674	
21	14 December 1985	Bury	H	1–0	4,038	Sinton (pen)
22	22 December 1985	Bristol Rovers	H	1–0	5,724	Cooke
23	28 December 1985	Bournemouth	A	0–0	4,006	
24	4 January 1986	Cardiff City	A	0–1	3,398	
25	11 January 1986	Wigan Athletic	H	1–3	4,048	Booker
26	18 January 1986	Wolverhampton Wanderers	A	4–1	3,420	Cooke (2), Sinton (2)
27	21 January 1986	Notts County	H	1–1	4,002	Evans
28	24 January 1986	Doncaster Rovers	H	1–3	3,568	Cooke
29	1 February 1986	Plymouth Argyle	A	0–2	4,873	
30	4 February 1986	Walsall	H	1–3	3,015	Alexander
31	1 March 1986	Rotherham United	A	2–1	3,260	Booker, Cooke
32	8 March 1986	Swansea City	A	0–2	3,683	
33	11 March 1986	Newport County	A	2–1	1,508	Lynch, Cooke
34	14 March 1986	Bolton Wanderers	H	1–1	3,284	Booker
35	18 March 1986	Gillingham	A	2–1	3,558	Booker, Cooke
36	22 March 1986	Blackpool	H	1–1	3,528	Cooke
37	29 March 1986	Notts County	A	4–0	3,857	Burke, Cooke (2), Holloway
38	31 March 1986	Gillingham	H	1–2	4,702	Cooke
39	5 April 1986	Derby County	A	1–1	11,026	Holloway
40	13 April 1986	Bristol City	H	1–2	3,701	Millen
41	16 April 1986	Reading	A	1–3	6,855	Murray
42	19 April 1986	Chesterfield	A	3–1	2,344	Cooke, Butler, Booker
43	22 April 1986	Lincoln City	H	0–1	3,011	
44	26 April 1986	York City	H	3–3	2,864	Hood (og), R. Joseph, F. Joseph
45	3 May 1986	Bury	A	0–0	2,953	
46	5 May 1986	Darlington	H	2–1	2,824	Millen, Cooke

=== FA Cup ===
Round	Date	Opponent	Venue	Result	Attendance	Scorer(s)
1R	16 November 1985	Bristol Rovers	H	1–3	4,716	Evans

=== Football League Cup ===
Round	Date	Opponent	Venue	Result	Attendance	Scorer(s)
1R (1st leg)	20 August 1985	Cambridge United	A	1–1	1,794	Booker
1R (2nd leg)	3 September 1985	Cambridge United	H	2–0 (won 3–1 on aggregate)	2,512	Cooke (pen), Hurlock
2R (1st leg)	25 September 1985	Sheffield Wednesday	H	2–2	5,352	Alexander (2)
2R (2nd leg)	15 October 1985	Sheffield Wednesday	A	0–2 (lost 2–4 on aggregate)	11,132	

=== Football League Trophy ===
Round	Date	Opponent	Venue	Result	Attendance	Scorer
SR1 (match 1)	15 January 1986	Derby County	H	0–0	2,531	
SR1 (match 2)	29 January 1986	Gillingham	A	1–1	1,464	Murray

- Sources: 100 Years of Brentford, The Big Brentford Book of the Eighties, Statto

== Playing squad ==
Players' ages are as of the opening day of the 1985–86 season.

Pos.	Name	Nat.	Date of birth (age)	Signed from	Signed in	Notes
Goalkeepers
GK	Richard Key	(England)	13 April 1956 (aged 29)	Swindon Town	1985	Non-contract
GK	Gary Phillips	(England)	20 September 1961 (aged 23)	Barnet	1984	
Defenders
DF	Jamie Bates	(England)	24 February 1968 (aged 17)	Youth	1986	Loaned to Maidstone United
DF	Terry Evans	(England)	12 April 1965 (aged 20)	Hillingdon	1985	
DF	Roger Joseph	(England)	24 December 1965 (aged 19)	Southall	1984	
DF	Keith Millen	(England)	26 September 1966 (aged 18)	Youth	1985	
DF	Jamie Murray	(Scotland)	27 December 1958 (aged 26)	Cambridge United	1984	
DF	Danis Salman	(England)	12 March 1960 (aged 25)	Youth	1975	
DF	Steve Wignall (c)	(England)	17 September 1954 (aged 30)	Colchester United	1984	
Midfielders
MF	Terry Bullivant	(England)	23 September 1956 (aged 28)	Unattached	1985	
MF	Steve Burke	(England)	29 September 1960 (aged 24)	Queens Park Rangers	1986	On loan from Queens Park Rangers
MF	Ian Holloway	(England)	12 March 1963 (aged 22)	Wimbledon	1986	On loan from Wimbledon
MF	Tony Lynch	(England)	20 January 1966 (aged 19)	Youth	1983	
MF	Andy Sinton	(England)	19 March 1966 (aged 19)	Cambridge United	1985	
MF	George Torrance	(Scotland)	17 September 1957 (aged 27)	Wokingham Town	1984	Loaned to Maidstone United
Forwards
FW	Rowan Alexander	(Scotland)	28 January 1961 (aged 24)	St Mirren	1984	
FW	Bob Booker	(England)	25 January 1958 (aged 27)	Bedmond Sports & Social	1978	
FW	Steve Butler	(England)	27 January 1962 (aged 23)	Windsor & Eton	1984	Loaned to Maidstone United
FW	Robbie Cooke	(England)	16 February 1957 (aged 28)	Cambridge United	1984	
FW	Francis Joseph	(England)	6 March 1960 (aged 25)	Wimbledon	1982	
Players who left the club mid-season
DF	Bobby Fisher	(England)	3 August 1956 (aged 29)	Cambridge United	1984	Released
MF	Gary Cooper	(England)	20 November 1965 (aged 19)	Queens Park Rangers	1985	Returned to Queens Park Rangers after loan
MF	Terry Hurlock	(England)	22 November 1958 (aged 26)	Leytonstone/Ilford	1980	Transferred to Reading
MF	Gary Roberts	(Wales)	5 April 1960 (aged 25)	Wembley	1980	Released

- Sources: The Big Brentford Book of the Eighties, Timeless Bees

== Coaching staff ==
Name	Role
(Scotland) Frank McLintock	Manager
(Scotland) John Docherty	Assistant Manager
(England) Ron Woolnough	Physiotherapist

== Statistics ==
=== Appearances and goals ===
Substitute appearances in brackets.

Pos	Nat	Name	League		FA Cup		League Cup		FL Trophy		Total	
Pos	Nat	Name	Apps	Goals	Apps	Goals	Apps	Goals	Apps	Goals	Apps	Goals
GK	(England)	Richard Key	3	0	—		0	0	0	0	3	0
GK	(England)	Gary Phillips	43	0	1	0	4	0	2	0	50	0
DF	(England)	Terry Evans	18 (1)	1	1	1	1	0	2	0	22 (1)	2
DF	(England)	Roger Joseph	27 (1)	1	0	0	3	0	2	0	32 (1)	1
DF	(England)	Keith Millen	30 (2)	2	0	0	4	0	1	0	35 (2)	2
DF	(Scotland)	Jamie Murray	45	3	1	0	4	0	2	1	52	4
DF	(England)	Danis Salman	40	0	1	0	2	0	2	0	45	0
DF	(England)	Steve Wignall	28	2	1	0	3	0	0	0	32	2
MF	(England)	Terry Bullivant	7 (1)	1	1	0	1	0	0	0	9 (1)	1
MF	(England)	Terry Hurlock	27	2	0	0	4	1	1	0	32	3
MF	(England)	Tony Lynch	28 (5)	5	1	0	4	0	2	0	35 (5)	5
MF	(Wales)	Gary Roberts	3	1	0	0	0	0	—		3	1
MF	(England)	Andy Sinton	26	3	—		—		2	0	28	3
MF	(Scotland)	George Torrance	18 (3)	0	1	0	4	0	1	0	24 (3)	0
FW	(Scotland)	Rowan Alexander	24 (4)	6	1	0	2 (1)	2	1 (1)	0	28 (6)	8
FW	(England)	Bob Booker	44	7	1	0	4	1	1	0	50	8
FW	(England)	Steve Butler	10	1	0	0	0	0	0	0	10	1
FW	(England)	Robbie Cooke	43 (1)	17	1	0	4	1	2	0	50 (1)	18
FW	(England)	Francis Joseph	5 (3)	1	0	0	0	0	0	0	5 (3)	1
Players loaned in during the season
MF	(England)	Steve Burke	10	1	—		—		—		10	1
MF	(England)	Gary Cooper	9 (1)	0	—		—		—		9 (1)	0
MF	(England)	Ian Holloway	13	2	—		—		—		13	2

- Players listed in italics left the club mid-season.
- Source: The Big Brentford Book of the Eighties

=== Goalscorers ===
Pos.	Nat	Player	FL3	FAC	FLC	FLT	Total
FW	(England)	Robbie Cooke	17	0	1	0	18
FW	(England)	Bob Booker	7	0	1	0	8
FW	(Scotland)	Rowan Alexander	6	0	2	0	8
MF	(England)	Tony Lynch	5	0	0	0	5
DF	(Scotland)	Jamie Murray	3	0	0	1	4
MF	(England)	Andy Sinton	3	—	—	0	3
MF	(England)	Terry Hurlock	2	0	1	0	3
MF	(England)	Ian Holloway	2	—	—	—	2
DF	(England)	Keith Millen	2	0	0	0	2
DF	(England)	Steve Wignall	2	0	0	0	2
DF	(England)	Terry Evans	1	1	0	0	2
MF	(England)	Steve Burke	1	—	—	—	1
MF	(Wales)	Gary Roberts	1	0	0	—	1
MF	(England)	Terry Bullivant	1	0	0	0	1
FW	(England)	Steve Butler	1	0	0	0	1
FW	(England)	Francis Joseph	1	0	0	0	1
DF	(England)	Roger Joseph	1	0	0	0	1
Opponents			1	0	0	0	1
Total			58	1	5	1	65

- Players listed in italics left the club mid-season.
- Source: The Big Brentford Book of the Eighties

=== Management ===
Name	Nat	From	To	Record All Comps					Record League				
Name	Nat	From	To	P	W	D	L	W %	P	W	D	L	W %
Frank McLintock	(Scotland)	17 August 1985	5 May 1986	53	19	16	18	35.85	46	18	12	16	39.13

=== Summary ===
Games played	53 (46 Third Division, 1 FA Cup, 4 League Cup, 2 Football League Trophy)
Games won	19 (18 Third Division, 0 FA Cup, 1 League Cup, 0 Football League Trophy)
Games drawn	16 (12 Third Division, 0 FA Cup, 2 League Cup, 2 Football League Trophy)
Games lost	18 (16 Third Division, 1 FA Cup, 1 League Cup, 0 Football League Trophy)
Goals scored	65 (58 Third Division, 1 FA Cup, 5 League Cup, 1 Football League Trophy)
Goals conceded	70 (61 Third Division, 3 FA Cup, 5 League Cup, 1 Football League Trophy)
Clean sheets	14 (12 Third Division, 0 FA Cup, 1 League Cup, 1 Football League Trophy)
Biggest league win	4–0 versus Notts County, 29 March 1986
Worst league defeat	4–0 on two occasions
Most appearances	52, Jamie Murray (45 Third Division, 1 FA Cup, 4 League Cup, 2 Football League Trophy)
Top scorer (league)	17, Robbie Cooke
Top scorer (all competitions)	18, Robbie Cooke

== Transfers & loans ==
Players transferred in
Date	Pos.	Name	Previous club	Fee	Ref.
July 1985	DF	(England) Terry Evans	(England) Hillingdon	n/a	
August 1985	MF	(England) Terry Bullivant	Unattached	Free	
August 1985	GK	(England) Richard Key	(England) Swindon Town	Non-contract	
29 November 1985	GK	(England) Richard Key	(England) Swindon Town	Non-contract	
December 1985	MF	(England) Andy Sinton	(England) Cambridge United	£25,000	
1985	MF	(England) Robbie Peters	n/a	n/a	
Players loaned in
Date from	Pos.	Name	From	Date to	Ref.
September 1985	MF	(England) Gary Cooper	(England) Queens Park Rangers	November 1985	
12 March 1986	MF	(England) Ian Holloway	(England) Wimbledon	End of season	
March 1986	MF	(England) Steve Burke	(England) Queens Park Rangers	End of season	
Players transferred out
Date	Pos.	Name	Subsequent club	Fee	Ref.
21 August 1985	MF	(England) Chris Kamara	(England) Swindon Town	£14,500	
August 1985	FW	(England) Keith Cassells	(England) Mansfield Town	£17,000	
27 October 1985	GK	(England) Richard Key	(England) Swindon Town	Non-contract	
February 1986	MF	(England) Terry Hurlock	(England) Reading	£95,000	
Players loaned out
Date from	Pos.	Name	To	Date to	Ref.
September 1985	FW	(England) Steve Butler	(England) Maidstone United	November 1985	
March 1986	DF	(England) Jamie Bates	(England) Maidstone United	n/a	
March 1986	MF	(Scotland) George Torrance	(England) Maidstone United	n/a	
Players released
Date	Pos.	Name	Subsequent club	Join date	Ref.
October 1985	DF	(England) Bobby Fisher	(England) Maidstone United	1985	
January 1986	MF	(Wales) Gary Roberts	(England) Barnet	1986	
May 1986	FW	(Scotland) Rowan Alexander	(Scotland) Greenock Morton	1986	
May 1986	MF	(England) Terry Bullivant	Retired		
May 1986	FW	(England) Steve Butler	(England) Maidstone United	1986	
May 1986	MF	(England) Tony Lynch	(England) Maidstone United	1986	
May 1986	MF	(Scotland) George Torrance	(England) Maidstone United	1986	

== Awards ==
- Supporters' Player of the Year: Gary Phillips
- Players' Player of the Year: Gary Phillips
