= 1985 Associate Members' Cup final =

1985 Associate Members' Cup Final
- Event: 1984–85 Associate Members' Cup
Wigan Athletic	Brentford
3	1
- Date: 1 June 1985
- Venue: Wembley Stadium, London
- Referee: Tom Bune (Newbury)
- Attendance: 39,897
- Weather: Sunny

The 1985 Associate Members' Cup Final, known as the Freight Rover Trophy for sponsorship reasons, was the 2nd final of the domestic football cup competition for teams from the Third and Fourth Divisions.

The final was played at Wembley Stadium in London on 1 June 1985, and was contested by Wigan Athletic and Brentford. Wigan Athletic won the match 3–1, with Mike Newell, Tony Kelly and David Lowe scoring the goals. The trophy was presented by guest of honour Elton John.

== Match details ==
1 June 1985

Wigan Athletic	3–1	Brentford
Newell 27'; Kelly 38'; Lowe 55'	Report	Cooke 52'

Wembley Stadium, London
Attendance: 39,897
Referee: Tom Bune (Newbury)

Wigan Athletic	Brentford

GK	Roy Tunks
DF	Alex Cribley
DF	Barry Knowles
DF	Steve Walsh
DF	Colin Methven (c)
MF	David Lowe
MF	Tony Kelly
MF	Graham Barrow
MF	Kevin Langley
FW	Gary Bennett	(substituted off) 65'
FW	Mike Newell	(substituted off) 85'
Substitutes:
FW	Warren Aspinall	(substituted on) 65'
FW	Paul Jewell	(substituted on) 85'
Manager:
Bryan Hamilton

GK	Gary Phillips
DF	Danis Salman
DF	Jamie Murray
DF	Keith Millen
DF	Steve Wignall
MF	Terry Hurlock (c)
MF	Chris Kamara
MF	Bob Booker	(substituted off) 60'
FW	Robbie Cooke
FW	Gary Roberts
FW	Keith Cassells
Substitutes:
MF	Terry Bullivant	(substituted on) 60'
MF	George Torrance
Manager:
Frank McLintock

MATCH RULES

- 90 minutes.
- 30 minutes of extra-time if necessary.
- Penalty shoot-out if scores still level.
- Two named substitutes
- Maximum of two substitutions.

== Road to Wembley ==
=== Wigan Athletic ===
First Round 1st leg	Wrexham	2–2	Wigan Athletic
First Round 2nd leg	Wigan Athletic	3–1	Wrexham
	Wigan Athletic won 5–3 on aggregate		
Second Round	Bury	0–1	Wigan Athletic
Northern Section Quarter-finals	Wigan Athletic	3–1	Tranmere Rovers
Northern Section Semi-final	Lincoln City	1–3	Wigan Athletic
Northern Section Final	Mansfield Town	1–1	Wigan Athletic
	Wigan Athletic won 3–1 on penalties		

=== Brentford ===
First Round 1st leg	Reading	1–3	Brentford
First Round 2nd leg	Brentford	2–0	Reading
	Brentford won 5–1 on aggregate		
Second Round	Brentford	1–0	Cambridge United
Southern Section Quarter-finals	Swansea City	0–2	Brentford
Southern Section Semi-final	Bournemouth	2–3	Brentford
Southern Section Final	Brentford	6–0	Newport County
