= Alex Cribley =

English footballer

Personal information
- Full name: Alexander Cribley
- Date of birth: 1 April 1957 (age 69)
- Place of birth: Liverpool, England
- Height: 5 ft 11 in (1.80 m)
- Position: Defender

Senior career*
Years	Team	Apps	(Gls)
1978–1980	Liverpool	0	(0)
1980–1988	Wigan Athletic	272	(16)

Managerial career
- 1995: Wigan Athletic
- * Club domestic league appearances and goals

Alexander Cribley (born 1 April 1957) is an English former footballer who played as a central defender. He spent the majority of his playing career at Wigan Athletic, and made over 250 appearances for the club. He was part of the staff at Wigan, working as a physiotherapist. He was part of the team that won the Associate Members' Cup in 1985.

== Playing career ==
Cribley began his career at Liverpool, but was released without making a first-team appearance. He was offered a trial by Wigan Athletic in October 1980, and was given a chance to play for the first team following an injury to Neil Davids. He made his debut against AFC Bournemouth in November 1980, and went on to make 30 league appearances during his first season at the club. He then helped the club win promotion to the Third Division in the 1981–82 season. In April 1983, Cribley scored his first goal for Wigan in a 3–1 win against Wrexham.

Cribley played in Wigan's 3–1 victory over Brentford in the final of the 1984–85 Associate Members' Cup. In 1986, he was appointed as Wigan Athletic's captain, and also became the club's regular penalty taker, scoring 10 times from the spot during the 1986–87 season.

In October 1987, Cribley played his final game for the club against Sunderland, in which he suffered a serious ankle injury. Following medical advice, he eventually announced his retirement the following summer. During his eight seasons playing for the club, he made over 300 appearances in all competitions, scoring 18 goals.

== Post-playing ==
After ending his playing career, Cribley remained on the coaching staff at Wigan, eventually becoming the club's physiotherapist. He was granted a testimonial game by Wigan, which was played against Everton in May 1990.

In October 1995, he briefly served as caretaker manager for Wigan, following the departure of Graham Barrow.

Cribley left the club in 2015, ending a 35-year association with Wigan Athletic.

== Honours ==
Wigan Athletic

- Associate Members' Cup: 1984–85
