= Jamie Murray (footballer) =

Scottish footballer

Personal information
- Full name: James Gerald Murray
- Date of birth: 27 December 1958 (age 67)
- Place of birth: Ayr, Scotland
- Position: Left back

Youth career
- –1976: Rivet Sports

Senior career*
Years	Team	Apps	(Gls)
1976–1984	Cambridge United	229	(3)
1984	→ Sunderland (loan)	1	(0)
1984–1987	Brentford	134	(3)
1987–1988	Cambridge United	13	(0)
- Soham Town Rangers
Total		373	(6)

Managerial career
- Histon (assistant)
- * Club domestic league appearances and goals

James Gerald Murray (born 27 December 1958) is a Scottish retired professional footballer who played as a left back in the Football League for Cambridge United, Brentford and Sunderland. He was described by Cambridge News as "one of the greatest left backs to have featured" for Cambridge United.

== Career ==
=== Cambridge United ===
A full back, Murray joined Fourth Division club Cambridge United from non-League club Rivet Sports in September 1976. He quickly became an important player in the club's rise from the Fourth to the Second Division and made 147 consecutive appearances between 1980 and his departure in 1984. As of November 2014, Murray is 11th on Cambridge United's record-appearances list.

==== Sunderland (loan) ====
In March 1984, Murray joined First Division club Sunderland on loan with a view to a permanent move. He made just one appearance, in a 1–1 draw with Tottenham Hotspur on 7 April, before returning to the Abbey Stadium.

=== Brentford ===
Murray joined Third Division club Brentford for a £30,000 fee in July 1984. He was an ever-present during the 1984–85 season and missed just one match in 1985–86. He continued his virtual ever-present status through the 1986–87 season, before departing Griffin Park in September 1987. Murray made 166 appearances and scored four goals in just over three years with Brentford.

=== Return to Cambridge United ===
In September 1987, Murray returned to Cambridge United for a £5,000 fee. Now playing in the Fourth Division, he appeared sparingly and left at the end of the 1987–88 season.

=== Soham Town Rangers ===
Murray closed out his career with a spell at Eastern Counties League club Soham Town Rangers.

== Coaching career ==
Murray briefly served as assistant to Steve Fallon at Histon during the 2000s.

== Personal life ==
Murray's son Antonio is semi-professional footballer.

== Career statistics ==
Appearances and goals by club, season and competition
Club	Season	League			FA Cup		League Cup		Other		Total	
Club	Season	Division	Apps	Goals	Apps	Goals	Apps	Goals	Apps	Goals	Apps	Goals
Sunderland (loan)	1983–84	First Division	1	0	—		—		—		1	0
Brentford	1984–85	Third Division	46	0	4	0	4	0	7	0	61	0
Brentford	1985–86	Third Division	45	3	1	0	4	0	2	1	52	4
Brentford	1986–87	Third Division	39	0	3	0	1	0	4	0	47	0
Brentford	1987–88	Third Division	4	0	—		2	0	—		6	0
Brentford	Total		134	3	8	0	11	0	13	1	166	4
Career total			135	3	8	0	11	0	13	1	167	4

== Honours ==
Brentford

- Associate Members' Cup runner-up: 1984–85
