= Kevin Langley =

English footballer (born 1964)

Personal information
- Full name: Kevin James Langley
- Date of birth: 24 May 1964
- Place of birth: St Helens, England
- Height: 6 ft 1 in (1.85 m)
- Position: Midfielder

Senior career*
Years	Team	Apps	(Gls)
1981–1986	Wigan Athletic	160	(6)
1986–1987	Everton	16	(2)
1987–1988	Manchester City	9	(0)
1988	→ Chester City (loan)	9	(0)
1988–1990	Birmingham City	76	(2)
1990–1994	Wigan Athletic	157	(6)
1994–1995	Halifax Town		
1995–1997	Bangor City		
1997–1998	Flint Town United		
1998	Witton Albion		
–	Runcorn		
–	Congleton Town		
–	Kidsgrove Athletic		

Managerial career
- 1996–1997: Bangor City
- 2001: Winsford United (caretaker)
- 2001–2002: Congleton Town
- 2002: Kidsgrove Athletic
- 2002–2004: Congleton Town
- –: Witton Albion
- 2011: Northwich Villa.
- * Club domestic league appearances and goals

Kevin James Langley (born 24 May 1964) is an English former professional footballer who played as a midfielder. He made 427 appearances in the Football League, including a club record 317 for Wigan Athletic.

== Life and career ==
Born in St Helens, Lancashire, Langley was working as a painter and decorator when he wrote to Wigan Athletic asking for a trial which resulted in him being offered an apprenticeship. He made his first-team debut aged 17 in September 1981, and over the next five years he played 160 league games for the club. He was part of the team that won the Associate Members' Cup in 1985. Before the 1986–87 season, Howard Kendall's Everton paid £120,000 for his services. Although Langley played 16 league matches, contributing to the club winning the First Division championship, he left the club in March 1987 for Manchester City. His stay at City was almost as brief, and included a spell on loan at Chester City before joining Birmingham City in March 1988. After two and a half years at the club, by which time they were in their second season in the Third Division, he returned to Wigan Athletic, where he went on to play another 157 league games, making a club record 317 in total.

Released at the end of the 1993–94 season, he joined League of Wales side Bangor City, contributing to them winning the league championship and representing them in the 1995–96 UEFA Cup. Appointed player-manager in November 1996, he left the club at the end of the 1996–97 season.

He moved on to a variety of non-league clubs, as player, player-manager or manager, and has been employed by Wigan Athletic as a coach at their Centre of Excellence. In 2011, he was briefly manager of Northwich Villa.

== Honours ==
Wigan Athletic

- Associate Members' Cup: 1984–85

Everton FC

- Football League First Division: 1986–87
