= Richard Key =

English footballer

Personal information
- Full name: Richard Martin Key
- Date of birth: 13 April 1956 (age 70)
- Place of birth: Cambridge, England
- Position: Goalkeeper

Youth career
- –1975: Coventry City

Senior career*
| Years | Team | Apps | (Gls) |
| 1975–1978 | Exeter City | 109 | (0) |
| 1978–1983 | Cambridge United | 52 | (0) |
| 1982 | → Northampton Town (loan) | 2 | (0) |
| 1983–1984 | Orient | 42 | (0) |
| 1984 | Brentford | 1 | (0) |
| 1984–1985 | Sunderland | 0 | (0) |
| 1985 | → Cambridge United (loan) | 13 | (0) |
| 1985 | Brentford | | |
| 1985 | Swindon Town | 0 | (0) |
| 1985–1987 | Brentford | 3 | (0) |
| 1987 | Millwall | 0 | (0) |
| 1988 | Cambridge United | 0 | (0) |
- Cambridge City
- * Club domestic league appearances and goals

Richard Martin Key (born 13 April 1956) is an English retired professional footballer, best remembered for his spells as a goalkeeper in the Football League with Exeter City and hometown club Cambridge United. His younger brother Lance was also a goalkeeper.

== Personal life ==
Key lives in Freshwater, Isle of Wight.

== Career statistics ==
Appearances and goals by club, season and competition
| Club | Season | League | | | FA Cup | | League Cup | | Other | | Total | |
| Club | Season | Division | Apps | Goals | Apps | Goals | Apps | Goals | Apps | Goals | Apps | Goals |
|---|---|---|---|---|---|---|---|---|---|---|---|---|
| Brentford | 1984–85 | Third Division | 1 | 0 | — | | — | | 0 | 0 | 1 | 0 |
| Cambridge United (loan) | 1984–85 | Third Division | 13 | 0 | — | | — | | — | | 13 | 0 |
| Swindon Town | 1985–86 | Fourth Division | 0 | 0 | — | | 2 | 0 | — | | 2 | 0 |
| Brentford | 1985–86 | Third Division | 3 | 0 | — | | 0 | 0 | 0 | 0 | 3 | 0 |
| Brentford | 1986–87 | Third Division | 0 | 0 | 0 | 0 | 0 | 0 | 1 (Note: Appearance in Football League Trophy) | 0 | 1 | 0 |
| Brentford | Total | | 4 | 0 | 0 | 0 | 0 | 0 | 1 | 0 | 5 | 0 |
| Career total | | | 17 | 0 | 0 | 0 | 2 | 0 | 1 | 0 | 20 | 0 |

== Honours ==
Exeter City

- Football League Fourth Division second-place promotion: 1976–77
