= Bobby Fisher (footballer) =

English footballer (born 1956)

Personal information
- Full name: Robert Paul Fisher
- Date of birth: 3 August 1956 (age 70)
- Place of birth: Wembley, England
- Height: 5 ft 8 in (1.73 m)
- Position: Right back

Senior career*
Years	Team	Apps	(Gls)
1973–1982	Orient	314	(4)
1982–1984	Cambridge United	42	(0)
1984–1986	Brentford	45	(0)
1986–1987	Maidstone United		
- * Club domestic league appearances and goals

Robert Paul Fisher (born 3 August 1956) is an English retired professional footballer, best remembered for his 9 years as a right back in the Football League with Orient, for whom he made 350 appearances and was captain. After leaving Orient in 1982, Fisher played for Cambridge United and Brentford, before dropping into non-League football. He later moved into coaching and television.

== Playing career ==
=== Orient ===
A right back, Fisher began his career in the youth system at Second Division club Orient and made his debut during the 1972–73 season while still a teenager. He broke into the team in the following season and became the Brisbane Road club's regular right back until 1982. Aside from being named captain, a highlight of Fisher's time with Orient came in April 1978, when the Os' 1977–78 FA Cup run saw them denied a place at Wembley after a 3–0 defeat to First Division club Arsenal in the semi-finals. Orient's relegation to Third Division in 1982 saw Fisher leave the club, after making 350 appearances in 9 years.

=== Cambridge United ===
Fisher signed for Second Division club Cambridge United in November 1982. He failed to hold down a regular place in the team and departed in February 1984.

=== Brentford ===
Fisher joined Third Division strugglers Brentford for a £5,000 fee in February 1984. His presence in the defence helped stabilise the defence and guide the Bees away from relegation to a 20th-place finish. He continued as Frank McLintock's first choice right back until March 1985, when young centre back Keith Millen broke into the team and McLintock moved Danis Salman to right back. Fisher had his contract cancelled and he departed Brentford in October 1986, having made 56 appearances during just over 2 1/2 years at Griffin Park.

=== Maidstone United ===
Fisher ended his career in non-League football with Conference club Maidstone United.

== Coaching career ==
Fisher was head coach of the Great Britain Over 45s team which won the gold medal at the 2009 Maccabiah Games. He served as assistant to David Pollock of the Open team at the 2013 edition.

== Television career ==
After his retirement from football, Fisher dabbled in acting, making appearances in television series' Space Precinct, Starhunter, Forensic Factor and The Manageress.

== Personal life ==
Fisher is the nephew of former footballer Mark Lazarus and began his career at Orient while Lazarus was winding down his league career with his second spell at the club. Being mixed-race and Jewish, he has spoken about the racism he received from the terraces as a player.

== Career statistics ==
Appearances and goals by club, season and competition
Club	Season	League			FA Cup		League Cup		Other		Total	
Club	Season	Division	Apps	Goals	Apps	Goals	Apps	Goals	Apps	Goals	Apps	Goals
Brentford	1983–84	Third Division	17	0	0	0	0	0	2 (Note: Appearances in Football League Trophy)	0	19	0
Brentford	1984–85	Third Division	28	0	3	0	4	0	2	0	37	0
Brentford	1985–86	Third Division	0	0	0	0	0	0	0	0	0	0
Career total			45	0	3	0	4	0	4	0	56	0
