= Barry Knowles =

English footballer

Personal information
- Full name: James Barry Knowles
- Date of birth: 25 April 1959 (age 67)
- Place of birth: Wigan, England
- Height: 5 ft 9 in (1.75 m)
- Position: Left back

Senior career*
Years	Team	Apps	(Gls)
1978–1980	Southport	63	(1)
	Runcorn	63	(5)
	Barrow	83	(7)
1984–1988	Wigan Athletic	173	(5)
	Altrincham	54	(3)
Total		445	(24)
- * Club domestic league appearances and goals

James Barry Knowles (born 25 April 1959) is an English former footballer who played as a full-back. He most notably played for Wigan Athletic between 1984 and 1988, and was part of the team that won the Football League Trophy in 1985 and reached the quarter-finals of the FA Cup in 1986. Causing him to become a Wigan Legend.

Knowles started his career at Southport, making 63 league appearances for the club. He then moved on to Runcorn, winning the Northern Premier League with the club. He signed for Wigan from Barrow in October 1984. He was part of the team that won the Freight Rover Trophy in 1985.

After retiring, he worked as a youth coach at Wigan Athletic, Everton, and Blackpool.

On 17 February 2015 he was appointed as head of youth development of Bharat FC in the I-League. In July 2016, he joined DSK Shivajians.

== Honours ==
Wigan Athletic

- Associate Members' Cup: 1984–85
