= Roger Joseph =

English footballer (born 1965)

Personal information
- Full name: Roger Anthony Joseph
- Date of birth: 24 December 1965 (age 60)
- Place of birth: Paddington, England
- Height: 5 ft 11 in (1.80 m)
- Position: Right back

Youth career
- –1983: Brentford
- 1983–1984: Southall

Senior career*
Years	Team	Apps	(Gls)
1984–1988	Brentford	105	(2)
1988–1996	Wimbledon	162	(0)
1995	→ Millwall (loan)	5	(0)
1996	Chelsea	0	(0)
1996–1997	Leyton Orient	14	(0)
1997	West Bromwich Albion	2	(0)
1997–2000	Leyton Orient	53	(0)
2001	Southall	0	(0)
2001–2002	King's Lynn	5	(0)
2003	AFC Wimbledon	0	(0)
2003–2004	Leatherhead		
2004	Southall	2	(0)
2004–2005	AFC Wimbledon	0	(0)

International career
1991	England B	2	(0)
- * Club domestic league appearances and goals

Roger Anthony Joseph (born 24 December 1965) is an English former professional footballer who played as a right back, best remembered for his time in the Football League with Wimbledon and Brentford. He won two caps for England B at international level.

== Club career ==
=== Brentford ===
Joseph began his career alongside his older brother Francis at Third Division club Brentford and rejoined the club in October 1984, after having been released as a junior and then playing non-League football for Southall. He made his senior debut on the final day of the 1984–85 season in a 1–1 draw with Millwall and attempted to establish himself as the club's first choice right back during the 1985–86 and 1986–87 seasons, before excelling in 1987–88 and winning Brentford's Players' Player of the Year award. His performances also saw him voted into the Third Division PFA Team of the Year and he became the first Brentford player to receive the accolade. He departed Griffin Park for a club record £150,000 fee in August 1988, having made 122 appearances and scored two goals for the Bees.

=== Wimbledon ===
Joseph signed for First Division club and reigning FA Cup holders Wimbledon in August 1988 for a £150,000 fee. He began his time with the Dons as a regular but drifted out of contention by the 1993–94 season, making just 13 league appearances, before managing just three appearances in the following season (ending the season on loan at First Division club Millwall) and remaining absent for the entirety of 1995–96. Joseph was released in May 1996 after making 199 appearances without scoring.

=== Later career ===
Joseph had a spell with Premier League club Chelsea during the early months of the 1996–97 season and made five appearances for the club's reserve team. He joined Third Division club Leyton Orient on a non-contract basis on 22 November 1996 and made 14 appearances before joined First Division club West Bromwich Albion on non-contract terms on 28 February 1997. He made just two substitute appearances in March 1997, before departing the club at the end of the 1996–97 season.

Joseph returned to Leyton Orient on 3 August 1997. He was a regular pick during the 1997–98 and 1998–99 seasons and helped Orient to the 1999 Third Division play-off final, which was lost 1–0 to Scunthorpe United. Joseph made just one appearance during the 1999–00 season and was released at the end of the campaign, after making 77 appearances across his two spells at Brisbane Road.

=== Non-League football ===
After his release from Leyton Orient, Joseph dropped into non-League football and played for King's Lynn, Leatherhead and had two spells with former club Southall. He had two spells with AFC Wimbledon during the 2003–04 and 2004–05 seasons and though he did not make any competitive appearances, he became one of the first players to play for both Wimbledon and its phoenix club.

== International career ==
Joseph won two England B caps during the second half of the 1990–91 season, starting in wins over Iceland and Switzerland B.

== Personal life ==
Joseph is of Dominican descent. His brother Francis and nephew Zak are also footballers. Prior to his return to professional football with Brentford in 1984, Joseph worked as a painter and decorator.

== Career statistics ==
Appearances and goals by club, season and competition
Club	Season	League			FA Cup		League Cup		Other		Total	
Club	Season	Division	Apps	Goals	Apps	Goals	Apps	Goals	Apps	Goals	Apps	Goals
Brentford	1984–85	Third Division	1	0	0	0	0	0	0	0	1	0
Brentford	1985–86	Third Division	28	1	0	0	2	0	3 (Note: Appearances in Football League Trophy)	0	33	1
Brentford	1986–87	Third Division	33	1	1	0	2	0	3	0	38	1
Brentford	1987–88	Third Division	43	0	1	0	2	0	3	0	49	0
Brentford	Total		105	2	2	0	6	0	9	0	122	2
Wimbledon	1988–89	First Division	31	0	0	0	0	0	0	0	31	0
Wimbledon	1989–90	First Division	19	0	0	0	0	0	0	0	19	0
Wimbledon	1990–91	First Division	38	0	0	0	0	0	0	0	38	0
Wimbledon	1991–92	First Division	26	0	0	0	0	0	0	0	26	0
Wimbledon	1992–93	Premier League	32	0	0	0	0	0	—		32	0
Wimbledon	1993–94	Premier League	13	0	1	0	1	0	—		15	0
Wimbledon	1994–95	Premier League	3	0	0	0	2	0	—		3	0
Wimbledon	Total		162	0	12	0	19	0	6	0	199	0
Millwall (loan)	1994–95	First Division	5	0	—		—		—		5	0
Leyton Orient	1996–97	Third Division	14	0	—		—		0	0	14	0
West Bromwich Albion	1996–97	First Division	2	0	—		—		—		2	0
Leyton Orient	1997–98	Third Division	25	0	1	0	3	0	1	0	30	0
Leyton Orient	1998–99	Third Division	27	0	1	0	2	0	2 (Note: Appearances in Third Division play-offs)	0	32	0
Leyton Orient	1999–00	Third Division	1	0	0	0	0	0	0	0	1	0
Leyton Orient	Total		67	0	2	0	5	0	3	0	77	0
King's Lynn	2001–02	Southern League Premier Division	5	0	—		—		0	0	5	0
Career total			358	0	16	0	30	0	18	0	422	0

== Honours ==
- Third Division PFA Team of the Year: 1987–88
- Brentford Players' Player of the Year: 1987–88
