= Robbie Cooke =

English footballer and manager (1957–2021)

Personal information
- Full name: Robert Leslie Cooke
- Date of birth: 16 February 1957
- Place of birth: Rotherham, England
- Date of death: 7 August 2021 (aged 64)
- Place of death: Peterborough, England
- Height: 5 ft 9 in (1.75 m)
- Position: Forward

Youth career
- –1975: Mansfield Town

Senior career*
Years	Team	Apps	(Gls)
1975–1978	Mansfield Town	15	(1)
1978–1980	Grantham	78	(65)
1980–1983	Peterborough United	114	(51)
1983	→ Luton Town (loan)	0	(0)
1983–1985	Cambridge United	65	(14)
1984–1985	→ Brentford (loan)		
1985–1987	Brentford	124	(53)
1987–1988	Millwall	4	(1)
1988–1991	Kettering Town	95	(49)
1991	Grantham Town	10	(5)
1991–1992	Northampton Spencer		
1992–1993	Bourne Town	35	(24)
Total		540	(263)

International career
	England C	2	

Managerial career
- Warboys Town
- * Club domestic league appearances and goals

Robert Leslie Cooke (16 February 1957 – 7 August 2021) was an English footballer and manager who played as a forward in the Football League, most notably for Peterborough United and Brentford. He represented England C at international level while playing non-League football. After retiring from football, Cooke managed Warboys Town and later became a scout.

== Club career ==
=== Mansfield Town ===
Cooke began his career in the youth system at Mansfield Town and made 9 appearances and scoring one goal in his debut season, in which the Stags won the 1976–77 Third Division championship. He made only six appearances in Second Division during the 1977–78 season and departed the club at the end of the campaign, having made just 15 first team appearances for the club.

=== Grantham ===
Cooke joined Southern League First Division North club Grantham during the 1978 off-season and scored 43 goals to propel the club to the 1978–79 division championship. Cooke's performances saw him awarded the Supporters' Player of the Year award. Grantham moved to the Northern Premier League for the 1979–80 season and Cooke was on fire again, scoring 39 goals. He departed the Gingerbreads at the end of the campaign.

=== Peterborough United ===
Cooke's goalscoring exploits for Grantham caught the eye of Fourth Division club Peterborough United, which culminated in him moving to the club for a £12,000 fee in May 1980. He was an immediate hit at Posh, scoring 29 goals in 56 games during the 1980–81 season and being named in the Fourth Division PFA Team of the Year. Cooke bettered his goalscoring tally in the 1981–82 season, with 31 goals in 55 games. Cooke's prolific form tailed off during the 1982–83 season and following a loan spell at First Division club Luton Town, he managed only 11 goals in 33 appearances before departing in February 1983. Cooke scored 71 goals in 144 appearances for the Posh.

=== Cambridge United ===
Cooke signed for Second Division club Cambridge United in February 1983 for a £12,000 fee. He failed to find his prolific goalscoring form for the struggling club, which suffered relegation to the Third Division at the end of the 1983–84 season. Cooke managed 14 goals in 65 league appearances and with relegation to the Fourth Division looming, he departed the club midway through the 1984–85 season.

=== Brentford ===
Cooke joined Third Division club Brentford on a two-month loan in December 1984 and he later signed permanently for fee ranging between £20,000 and £25,000. He quickly found form, scoring 16 goals in 31 games and scoring what proved to be a consolation in the 3–1 1985 Football League Trophy Final defeat to Wigan Athletic. Cooke finished the 1984–85 season as both Brentford and Cambridge United's top scorer, which was only the third time in history the feat had been managed. Three years of mid-table mediocrity followed and Cooke departed Brentford in December 1987, having scored 64 goals in 150 games for the Bees.

=== Millwall ===
Cooke joined Second Division high-flyers Millwall on 11 December 1987 for a £30,000 fee and scored one goal in five appearances during the remainder of the 1987–88 season. He was unable to break up the forward pairing of Tony Cascarino and Teddy Sheringham and departed the Lions in September 1988.

=== Non-League football ===
Cooke dropped back into non-League football to join Conference club Kettering Town in September 1988. He had a prolific spell with the Poppies, scoring 49 goals in 95 appearances across three seasons in which the club consistently challenged for promotion to the Football League. Cooke ended his career with spells at Northampton Spencer, Bourne Town and a second stint at Grantham Town.

== International career ==
Cooke's form while at Kettering Town won him England C recognition.

== Managerial and coaching career ==
Cooke had a spell as player-coach at Southern League Midland Division club Grantham Town during the 1991–92 season. After his retirement from football, Cooke became manager at Eastern Counties League First Division club Warboys Town. In December 1998, Cooke returned to Kettering Town to become assistant manager and first team coach.

== Scouting career ==
Cooke was invited to become a part-time scout for Preston North End by former Cambridge United teammate and then-Preston manager David Moyes. Cooke subsequently followed Moyes to Premier League club Everton in 2002 and Manchester United in 2013, serving as chief scout at both clubs. After Moyes was sacked by Manchester United in April 2014, Cooke was not retained by incoming manager Louis van Gaal. In November 2014, Cooke was appointed to the role of UK and International Scout at Burnley. By June 2017, he had left the club. Cooke reunited with David Moyes at Premier League club West Ham United in 2020 and held the role of chief scout until his death in August 2021.

== Personal life ==
Cooke's nephew Russell was also a footballer and played for Hucknall Town, Eastwood Town and Ilkeston Town. Cooke worked for Thomas Cook and later for Travelex in the 1990s and at the time of his death from cancer at Thorpe Hall in August 2021, he was living in Sawtry.

== Career statistics ==
Appearances and goals by club, season and competition
Club	Season	League			FA Cup		League Cup		Other		Total	
Club	Season	Division	Apps	Goals	Apps	Goals	Apps	Goals	Apps	Goals	Apps	Goals
Peterborough United	1980–81	Fourth Division	46	22	6	4	4	3	—		56	29
Peterborough United	1981–82	Fourth Division	46	24	3	3	2	1	4 (Note: Appearances in Football League Group Cup)	3	55	31
Peterborough United	1982–83	Fourth Division	22	5	4	2	3	3	4 (Note: 3 appearances and 1 goal in Football League Trophy, 1 appearance in Northamptonshire Cup)	1	33	11
Peterborough United	Total		114	51	13	9	9	7	8	4	144	71
Brentford	1984–85	Third Division	24	12	—		—		7 (Note: Appearances in Football League Trophy)	4	31	16
Brentford	1985–86	Third Division	44	17	1	0	4	1	2	0	51	18
Brentford	1986–87	Third Division	40	20	3	0	2	1	3	4	48	25
Brentford	1987–88	Third Division	16	4	1	0	2	1	1	0	20	5
Brentford	Total		124	53	5	0	8	3	13	8	150	64
Millwall	1987–88	Second Division	4	1	—		—		1 (Note: Appearance in Full Members Cup)	0	5	1
Career total			242	105	18	9	17	10	22	12	299	136

== Honours ==
Grantham

- Southern League First Division North: 1978–79

Brentford

- Associate Members' Cup runner-up: 1984–85

Northampton Spencer

- United Counties League Premier Division: 1991–92

Individual

- Grantham Supporters' Player of the Year: 1978–79
- PFA Team of the Year: 1980–81 Fourth Division
