= George Torrance (footballer) =

Scottish footballer

Personal information
- Full name: George Clark Torrance
- Date of birth: 17 September 1957 (age 69)
- Place of birth: Rothesay, Scotland
- Position: Left midfielder

Senior career*
Years	Team	Apps	(Gls)
1980–1981	Camberley Town		(4)
- Farnborough Town
1982–1984	Wokingham Town		
1984–1986	Brentford	34	(1)
1986	→ Maidstone United (loan)		
1986–1987	Maidstone United	40	(6)
1987–1994	Falmouth Town	252	(55)
- Porthleven

Managerial career
- Porthleven (player-assistant)
- * Club domestic league appearances and goals

George Clark Torrance (born 17 September 1957) is a Scottish retired professional footballer who played as a left midfielder in the Football League for Brentford.

== Club career ==
=== Non-League football ===
A left-sided midfielder, Torrance began his career with Isthmian League First Division club Camberley Town, when he was stationed with the British Army in nearby Blackwater. He moved on to join fellow Isthmian League club Farnborough Town, before being posted to Germany for two years. While still in Germany, Torrance joined Isthmian League Premier Division club Wokingham Town where, in the 1982–83 FA Cup, he scored the equaliser in a 1–1 first round draw with Third Division club Cardiff City.

=== Brentford ===
Torrance and Wokingham Town teammate (and fellow soldier) Steve Butler joined Third Division club Brentford in December 1984, with the Griffin Park club paying £400 to buy the pair out of the army. Torrance found himself used as a utility player in his early time with the Bees, playing six different positions in his first eight games. He became an integral part of the team, making 17 appearances during the 1984–85 season, though an ankle injury saw him lose his place towards the end of the campaign. Torrance was an unused substitute for the 3–1 1985 Football League Trophy Final defeat by Wigan Athletic and later recalled that failing to get onto the pitch at Wembley was his "greatest disappointment". He played on into the 1985–86 season and departed the club during the campaign, having made 44 appearances and scored three goals.

=== Return to non-League football ===
Torrance joined Alliance Premier League club Maidstone United on loan during the 1985–86 season, helping the club stave off relegation on goal difference and signed on a permanent deal at the end of the campaign. He moved to Cornwall in 1987 and joined South Western League club Falmouth Town, winning three division championships and making over 250 appearances for the club. Torrance later joined Porthleven, playing well into his 40s and serving as player-assistant manager at the club.

== Representative career ==
In December 1986, Torrance was called upon to represent the FA XI in a match versus an Isthmian League representative team. He scored in a 4–1 victory. Despite being Scottish, Torrance appeared for England Police in a match versus Scotland in 1994, with England winning 3–0. Also playing for England was Torrance's Welsh former Brentford teammate, Gary Roberts.

== Personal life ==
Torrance served in the Royal Engineers and later ran a residential home with his parents-in-law in St Keverne. He joined the Devon and Cornwall Constabulary in 1994, after moving to Falmouth. He was later stationed in Truro and in 2010 was based at Royal Cornwall Hospital in the town. Torrance has two children and lives in Helston.

== Career statistics ==
Appearances and goals by club, season and competition
Club	Season	League			FA Cup		League Cup		Other		Total	
Club	Season	Division	Apps	Goals	Apps	Goals	Apps	Goals	Apps	Goals	Apps	Goals
Brentford	1984–85	Third Division	13	1	1	0	—		3 (Note: Appearances in Football League Trophy)	2	17	3
Brentford	1985–86	Third Division	21	0	1	0	4	0	1	0	27	0
Career total			34	1	2	0	4	0	4	2	44	3

== Honours ==
Falmouth Town

- South Western League: 1988–89, 1989–90, 1991–92
