= Gary Roberts (footballer, born 1960) =

Welsh footballer and manager

Personal information
- Full name: Gary Paul Michael Roberts
- Date of birth: 5 April 1960 (age 66)
- Place of birth: Rhyl, Wales
- Positions: Forward; winger

Senior career*
Years	Team	Apps	(Gls)
–1980	Wembley		
1980–1986	Brentford	187	(45)
1986–1987	Barnet	15	(3)
- Maidstone United
–1988	Welling United		
1988	Hitchin Town	18	(9)
1988	St Albans City	3	(1)
1988–1989	Stevenage Borough	13	(5)
1991	Baldock Town		
1991–1992	Stevenage Borough	15	(7)
1994	Baldock Town		
1994–1995	Cambridge City	17	(4)
1995–1996	Hitchin Town	19	(3)
1996	Braintree Town		
1996	Bishop's Stortford		

International career
- Wales U21

Managerial career
- 1999–2001: Baldock Town (joint-manager)
- 2001–2002: St Albans City (joint-manager)
- 2003–2016: Cambridge City
- * Club domestic league appearances and goals

Gary Paul Michael Roberts (born 5 April 1960) is a Welsh retired professional footballer who played as a forward and winger. As a player, he is best remembered for his six years in the Football League with Brentford, for whom he made over 220 appearances and is a member of the club's Hall of Fame. After retiring as a player, Roberts turned to management and spent 13 years as manager of Cambridge City.

== Club career ==
=== Brentford ===
Roberts was born in Rhyl, Wales. He began his career at Isthmian League First Division club Wembley and secured a £6,000 move to the Football League with Third Division club Brentford in October 1980. He made 19 appearances and scored three goals in the 1980–81 season. Following the departure of David Crown, Roberts was a regular during the following season, playing as a left winger, despite being right-footed. He also served as the club's PFA representative. Roberts came to the fore during the 1982–83 season, scoring 17 goals and amassing a career-high 58 appearances. He followed up with another 15 goals in 1983–84 and won the Midweek Sports Special Goal of the Month award for his finish in a 4–1 League Cup second round first leg defeat to First Division club Liverpool.

During the 1984–85 pre-season, Roberts suffered a fractured ankle under a heavy challenge from Tottenham Hotspur defender Graham Roberts during a friendly match. Roberts played the entire season with the aid of cortisone injections and painkillers and scored 18 goals in 15 appearances. He scored a hat-trick against Gillingham and scoring four in the 6–0 rout of Newport County in the Football League Trophy Southern Area final, which included a three-minute hat-trick either side of half time. Needing to raise transfer funds, Roberts was transfer-listed by manager Frank McLintock and moves to Derby County and Bradford City fell through.

Following rehabilitation on the ankle, Roberts again had to resort to painkillers and managed just three appearances during the 1985–86 season. He retired from professional football at the end of the campaign and made 224 appearances and scored 63 goals during his six years with the Bees. Roberts received a testimonial in May 1989, which raised £7,000 and was he inducted into the Brentford Hall of Fame in February 2020.

=== Non-League football ===
In 1986, Roberts dropped into non-League football to sign for Conference club Barnet in 1986, but he was only a bit-part player during the 1986–87 season, which saw the Bees narrowly miss out on promotion to the Football League after as finishing runners-up to Scarborough. Spells with other Conference clubs Maidstone United and Welling United followed before Roberts dropped down to the Isthmian League Premier Division to sign for Hitchin Town late in the 1987–88 season. He signed for St Albans City in 1988 and three goals in five games before departing the club.

Concurrently with his non-League career, as a serving officer, Roberts turned down an offer from Metropolitan Police and instead played for the Hertfordshire police team. He represented both the British and English police teams, captaining the former. Alternating spells with Stevenage Borough and Baldock Town followed from the late 1980s to the mid-1990s. Spells with Southern League clubs Cambridge City and Braintree Town followed, plus a second spell with Hitchin Town, before Roberts retired from football in 1996, following a short stint with Bishop's Stortford.

== International career ==
Roberts won one cap for the Wales U21 team.

== Management career ==
=== Baldock Town ===
Roberts took over as joint-manager of former club Baldock Town in 1999. Working alongside Steve Cook, the pair managed the Southern League First Division East club, winning The Herts Senior Cup just prior to it folding in 2001.

=== St Albans City ===
Roberts again returned to one of his former clubs, St Albans City, to take over as joint-manager alongside manager Steve Cook in 2001. A mid-table finish followed in the 2001–02 season, but the pair were sacked in December 2002, with the club top of the Isthmian League Premier Division table.

=== Cambridge City ===
Roberts took over as manager of Cambridge City in January 2003. In the remainder of the 2002–03 season, he steered the club away from relegation from the Southern League Premier Division. An eighth-place finish followed in 2003–04, before a restructuring of the non-League pyramid in 2004 saw the Lilywhites playing in the newly formed Conference South for the 2004–05 season. Roberts led the club to a second-place finish, but the season ended in a defeat to Eastbourne Borough in the playoff semi-finals. The season also included a club record-breaking run to the second round of the FA Cup.

Roberts kept City in the Conference South for three further seasons before the club was demoted back to the Southern League Premier Division in 2008, due to irregularities with the club's Milton Road ground. Over the following six seasons, Roberts guided City to five top-six finishes and a memorable run to the first round proper of the FA Cup in the 2012–13 season, taking League One club Milton Keynes Dons to a replay before being knocked out. He stepped down as manager during the 2016–17 pre-season.

== Personal life ==
Prior to becoming a professional footballer, Roberts worked as a bricklayer. During his time with Brentford, he settled in Baldock. After dropping out of professional football in 1986, Roberts worked for an insurance company in London and joined the police in June 1988. He served with the Hertfordshire Constabulary until he took early retirement in 2014. As of October 2022, Roberts was living in Rutland.

== Career statistics ==
=== Player ===
Appearances and goals by club, season and competition
Club	Season	League			FA Cup		League Cup		Other		Total	
Club	Season	Division	Apps	Goals	Apps	Goals	Apps	Goals	Apps	Goals	Apps	Goals
Brentford	1980–81	Third Division	19	3	0	0	0	0	—		19	3
Brentford	1981–82	Third Division	40	8	2	1	2	0	—		44	9
Brentford	1982–83	Third Division	45	12	3	2	7	3	—		55	17
Brentford	1983–84	Third Division	41	10	4	3	3	2	2 (Note: Appearances in Football League Trophy)	0	50	15
Brentford	1984–85	Third Division	39	11	4	0	4	2	6	5	53	18
Brentford	1985–86	Third Division	3	1	0	0	0	0	0	0	3	1
Brentford	Total		187	45	13	6	16	7	8	5	224	63
Barnet	1986–87	Conference	15	3	0	0	—		4 (Note: Appearances in FA Trophy)	3	19	6
Hitchin Town	1987–88	Isthmian League Premier Division	18	9	—		—		1 (Note: Appearance in Herts Charity Cup)	0	19	9
St Albans City	1988–89	Isthmian League Premier Division	3	1	—		—		2 (Note: 1 appearance and 1 goal in Isthmian League Cup, 1 appearance and 1 goal in Herts Senior Cup)	2	5	3
Stevenage Borough	1988–89	Isthmian League Second Division North	10	5	—		—		—		10	5
Stevenage Borough	1989–90	Isthmian League Second Division North	3	0	2	0	—		2 (Note: 1 appearance and 1 goal in Herts Charity Cup, 1 appearance in A.C. Delco Cup)	1	7	1
Stevenage Borough	Total		13	5	2	0	—		2	1	17	6
Stevenage Borough	1991–92	Isthmian League First Division	15	7	0	0	—		1 (Note: Appearance in Loctite Trophy)	0	16	7
Stevenage Borough	Total		28	12	2	0	—		3	1	33	13
Hitchin Town	1995–96	Isthmian League Premier Division	19	3	2	0	—		7 (Note: 4 appearances and 2 goals in Isthmian League Cup, 1 appearance in Isthmian League Full Members' Cup, 1 appearance and 1 goal in Herts Senior Cup, 1 appearance in Herts Charity Cup)	3	28	6
Hitchin Town	Total		37	12	2	0	—		8	3	47	15
Career total			267	72	17	6	16	7	23	12	323	97

=== Manager ===
Team	From	To	Record					Ref
Team	From	To	P	W	D	L	Win %	Ref
St Albans City	2001	December 2002	83	40	15	28	48.2	
Total			83	40	15	28	48.2	—

== Honours ==
Brentford

- Associate Members' Cup runner-up: 1984–85

Individual

- Brentford Hall of Fame
