= Lance Key =

English former footballer and manager (born 1968)

Personal information
- Full name: Lance William Key
- Date of birth: 13 May 1968 (age 58)
- Place of birth: Kettering, England
- Position: Goalkeeper

Senior career*
Years	Team	Apps	(Gls)
?–1990	Histon		
1990–1996	Sheffield Wednesday	0	(0)
1993	→ Oldham Athletic (loan)	2	(0)
1995	→ Oxford United (loan)	6	(0)
1995	→ Lincoln City (loan)	5	(0)
1995	→ Hartlepool United (loan)	1	(0)
1996	→ Rochdale (loan)	14	(0)
1996–1997	Dundee United	3	(0)
1997	Sheffield United	0	(0)
1997–1999	Rochdale	19	(0)
1998–2001	Northwich Victoria	51	(0)
2000	→ Altrincham (loan)	15	(0)
2001–2004	Kingstonian	136	(0)
2004–2008	Histon	124	(0)
2008	Wivenhoe Town	0	(0)
2010–2011	Rushden & Diamonds	0	(0)
Total		376	(0)

Managerial career
- 2016–2023: Histon
- * Club domestic league appearances and goals

Lance William Key (born 13 May 1968) is an English former footballer and manager, who played as a goalkeeper. He is the former manager of Histon FC.

== Career ==
Born in Kettering, Northamptonshire, Key began his professional career in April 1990 when he joined Sheffield Wednesday from non-league Histon for a fee of £10,000. He spent six years with Wednesday, but made just one appearance, as a substitute in the FA Cup at Gillingham. This followed the sending off of Kevin Pressman. Key's first touch was to pick the ball out of the net following the penalty which led to the sending off.

Loan spells with Oldham Athletic, Oxford United, Lincoln City, Hartlepool United and Rochdale followed before a free transfer move to Dundee United in July 1996.

At Tannadice, Key was understudy to regular keeper Ally Maxwell and made his debut on 2 November 1996 in a 3–1 win away to Motherwell. He played twice more later that month, and after a horrendous error against Dunfermline Athletic returned to England in March 1997 without making any further first team appearances, joining Sheffield United on a free transfer.

In August 1997 he joined Rochdale on a free transfer. He moved to Northwich Victoria on loan in December 1998, with the move being made permanent in February 1999.

He moved to Kingstonian in June 2001 and rejoined Histon in September 2004, where he helped the team to Southern League and Conference South championships. He left Histon in September 2008 and joined Wivenhoe Town, but left the club after just one FA Vase appearance. In July 2010 he joined Rushden & Diamonds as goalkeeping coach. He was released by the club in May 2011.

== Managerial career ==
Key was appointed manager of Histon on 7 October 2016, replacing Steve Fallon. He was relieved of duties on 28 September 2023 after winning only one of their opening ten league games.
