= Steve Fallon (footballer) =

English footballer (born 1956)

Personal information
- Full name: Stephen Paul Fallon
- Date of birth: 3 August 1956 (age 70)
- Place of birth: Peterborough, England
- Height: 6 ft 1 in (1.85 m)
- Position: Defender

Senior career*
Years	Team	Apps	(Gls)
- Whittlesey
1973–1974	Kettering Town		
1974–1986	Cambridge United	410	(27)
1986–1995	Cambridge City		

Managerial career
- 1988–1996: Cambridge City (player-manager)
- 1999–2010: Histon
- 2012–2015: Soham Town Rangers
- 2015–2016: Histon
- * Club domestic league appearances and goals

Stephen Paul Fallon (born 3 August 1956) is an English former footballer who made 410 appearances in the Football League playing as a defender for Cambridge United. From 1999 to 2010 he was manager of Histon. From 2012 Fallon was manager of Soham Town Rangers before he stepped down in October 2015, later in the same month he was reappointed manager of Histon. He is currently a PE teacher for Meridian Trust.

== Career ==
Fallon was born in Peterborough and brought up in Whittlesey, Cambridgeshire. He played for Whittlesey and for Kettering Town before joining Cambridge United as an 18-year-old, where he went on to make 410 league appearances, helping the club to promotions from the Fourth to the Second Division. Fallon retired from League football in 1986 because of a knee injury, and then spent nine years as player-manager of Southern League club (and cross-city rivals) Cambridge City.

In 1999 Fallon took over as manager of Histon, and led them from the Eastern Counties League Premier Division (level 9 of the English football league system) to the Conference National (level 5). In December 2006, Histon faced Fallon's former club Cambridge United in the first round of the FA Trophy in the first competitive match for more than 40 years between the two clubs, who had been seven divisions apart as recently as the early 1990s. Histon won 5–0. On 12 January 2010, a day after being re-instated as manager after being suspended following disagreements with the Chairman, it was announced that Histon had sacked Fallon citing "irreconcilable differences".

Fallon was appointed manager of Soham Town Rangers in March 2012 and stepped down in October 2015 and was then reappointed as manager of Histon in the same month. In October 2016 he became Director of Football, with Lance Key replacing him as manager.
