= Tony Lynch =

English footballer (born 1966)

Personal information
- Full name: Anthony Junior Lynch
- Date of birth: 20 January 1966 (age 60)
- Place of birth: Paddington, England
- Position: Left winger

Youth career
- –1984: Brentford

Senior career*
Years	Team	Apps	(Gls)
1983–1986	Brentford	45	(5)
1986–1987	Maidstone United	36	(4)
1987–1990	Wealdstone	140	(45)
1990–1994	Barnet	53	(11)
1994–1996	Stevenage Borough	61	(17)
1996–1997	Kettering Town	30	(7)
1997–1998	Hendon	23	(2)
- * Club domestic league appearances and goals

Anthony Junior Lynch (born 20 January 1966) is an English former professional footballer who played as a left winger in the Football League for Brentford and Barnet. Either side of his spells with the two clubs, he played non-League football for Maidstone United, Wealdstone, Stevenage Borough, Kettering Town and Hendon.

== Career ==
A left winger, Lynch began his career in the youth system at Brentford and while still an apprentice, he made four senior appearances during the 1983–84 season. He signed his first professional contract during the 1984 off-season, but made only 13 appearances during the 1984–85 season. The departure of a number of a number of players allowed Lynch to break into the first team during the 1985–86 season, in which he made 40 appearances and scored four goals. He was released by manager Frank McLintock in 1986 and dropped into non-League football.

After spells with Maidstone United and Wealdstone, Lynch joined Conference club Barnet in October 1990 and was a part of the team which was promoted to the Football League at the end of the 1990–91 season. He made 60 appearances and scored 12 goals for the club, before dropping back into non-League football to play for Stevenage Borough and Kettering Town. He made a reserve team appearance for Second Division strugglers Peterborough United in March 1997 and played the 1997–98 season with Isthmian League Premier Division club Hendon.

== Honours ==
Barnet

- Football Conference: 1990–91

Stevenage Borough

- Football Conference: 1995–96

Hendon

- Isthmian League Full Members Cup: 1997–98

== Career statistics ==
Appearances and goals by club, season and competition
Club	Season	League			FA Cup		League Cup		Other		Total	
Club	Season	Division	Apps	Goals	Apps	Goals	Apps	Goals	Apps	Goals	Apps	Goals
Brentford	1983–84	Third Division	2	0	0	0	0	0	2 (Note: Appearances in Football League Trophy)	0	4	0
Brentford	1984–85	Third Division	10	0	0	0	1	0	2	0	13	0
Brentford	1985–86	Third Division	33	5	1	0	4	0	2	0	40	5
Brentford	Total		45	5	1	0	5	0	6	0	57	5
Barnet	1990–91	Conference	15	7	—		—		0	0	15	7
Barnet	1991–92	Fourth Division	8	0	0	0	2	0	0	0	10	0
Barnet	1992–93	Third Division	8	1	0	0	1	0	0	0	9	1
Barnet	1993–94	Second Division	22	3	1	0	3	1	0	0	26	4
Barnet	Total		53	11	1	0	6	1	0	0	60	12
Stevenage Borough	1993–94	Isthmian League Premier Division	6	0	—		—		—		6	0
Stevenage Borough	1994–95	Conference	35	7	1	0	—		5 (Note: 3 appearances and 1 goal in FA Trophy, 2 appearances in Conference League Cup)	1	41	8
Stevenage Borough	1995–96	Conference	26	9	5	1	—		5 (Note: 3 appearances in FA Trophy, 1 appearance in Conference League Cup, 1 appearance in Herts Charity Cup)	0	36	10
Stevenage Borough	Total		67	16	6	1	—		10	1	83	18
Hendon	1997–98	Isthmian League Premier Division	23	2	1	0	—		14 (Note: 6 appearances and 3 goals in Isthmian League Full Members Cup, 3 appearances in FA Trophy, 2 appearances in Middlesex Senior Cup, 2 appearances in London Challenge Cup, 1 appearance in Isthmian League Cup)	3	38	5
Career total			188	34	9	1	11	1	30	4	238	40
