= Danis Salman =

English footballer (born 1960)

Personal information
- Full name: Danis Mahmut Mehmet Salman
- Date of birth: 12 March 1960 (age 66)
- Place of birth: Famagusta, Cyprus
- Height: 5 ft 10 in (1.78 m)
- Position: Defender

Youth career
- Arsenal
- Tottenham Hotspur
- –1975: Queens Park Rangers

Senior career*
Years	Team	Apps	(Gls)
1975–1986	Brentford	325	(8)
1986–1990	Millwall	93	(3)
1990–1992	Plymouth Argyle	74	(4)
1992	→ Peterborough United (loan)	1	(0)
1992–1993	Torquay United	20	(0)
Total		513	(15)

International career
1978	England Youth	5	(0)

Managerial career
- 1992–1993: Torquay United Youth (player-manager)
- * Club domestic league appearances and goals

Danis Mahmut Mehmet Salman (Turkish: Danış Salman; born 12 March 1960), sometimes known as Danny Salman, is an English former professional football player and coach, best remembered for his time as a defender in the Football League with Brentford. He made over 380 appearances for the Bees, is the club's youngest-ever league debutant and was inducted into the club's Hall of Fame. He also played for Millwall, Plymouth Argyle and Torquay United. Born in Cyprus, he represented England at youth level.

== Club career ==
=== Early years ===
Born in Famagusta, Cyprus, Salman was brought up in England from the age of two. He spent the early part of his career with Tottenham Hotspur, Queens Park Rangers and came under the wing of John Docherty at the latter club.

=== Brentford ===
Despite being offered an apprenticeship, a fee and a guaranteed professional contract by Arsenal, new Brentford manager John Docherty convinced Salman to join the Fourth Division club on schoolboy forms in September 1975. Beginning life at Griffin Park in the club's youth team, Salman was handed an unexpected senior debut in a match versus Watford on 15 November 1975, having never even trained with the first team. At 15 years, 248 days old, he became Brentford's youngest ever debutant. Salman later revealed that he only found out he was playing the day before the match, when a reporter from The Sun arrived at his house and told him the news. He made five further appearances during the 1975–76 season and 22 in the following campaign, scoring his first senior goal.

Salman's debutant record was beaten by Paul Walker in August 1976, but Salman remains the Bees' youngest-ever league debutant. Salman signed his first professional contract during the 1977 off-season, worth £55 a week. Adept at right back or centre back, he broke into the team during the 1977–78 season, making 37 appearances on the way to the Bees securing automatic promotion to the Third Division with a fourth-place finish. During the 1978 off-season, Brentford turned down transfer bids from other clubs for Salman's services.

Salman was a first-team regular until the 1982–83 season, when a mismanaged ruptured thigh injury restricted him to just a single appearance. Potential moves away from Griffin Park fell through, with Salman failing trials with Stoke City and Millwall in 1982. He re-established himself in the team during the 1984–85 season, making 58 appearances and following up with another 45 during the following season.

At only age 26, Salman was rewarded with a testimonial versus Tottenham Hotspur in May 1986, which earned him £5,552. The match brought down the curtain on an 11-year career at Griffin Park, during which Salman made 371 appearances and scored eight goals. A return to Brentford during the reign of Steve Perryman was mooted, but fell through after Perryman's departure in August 1990. In recognition of his performances for the club, Salman was inducted into the Brentford Hall of Fame in November 2014.

=== Millwall ===
Salman moved up to the Second Division to sign for Millwall in August 1986 for a £20,000 fee, which was settled by a tribunal. He made 36 appearances and scored two goals during a forgettable debut season, in which the Lions finished in the bottom half of the table. Everything came right during the 1987–88 season, making 42 appearances as the Lions won the Second Division title. Receiving the club's Player of the Year award capped Salman's season. His appearances tailed off in the First Division and he departed in March 1990, having made 112 appearances and scored five goals during his time at The Den.

=== Plymouth Argyle ===
Salman dropped back down to Second Division to sign for Plymouth Argyle on 20 March 1990 for a £50,000 fee. He made 11 appearances in what remained of the 1989–90 season, before establishing himself in the team in a poor 1990–91 season for the club. He remained with the club until the end of the 1991–92 season and played for Peterborough United on loan in March 1992. Salman departed Home Park having made 84 appearances and scored five goals for the Pilgrims.

=== Torquay United ===
Salman joined Third Division club Torquay United in September 1992. He made 20 league appearances during the 1992–93 season and retired at the end of the campaign.

== International career ==
Salman won five caps for England Youth and played at the 1978 European U18 Championship.

== Post-football career ==
While still a player, Salman had a spell managing the Torquay United youth team during the 1992–93 season, combining his role with that of the club's Youth Development Officer. He became the Gulls' Commercial Manager in 1993. As of July 2010, Salman was coaching youth players in the South West at his own soccer school and Plymouth College. He is a qualified sport and body massage therapist and as of July 2010 was working part-time for Plymouth Raiders.

== Personal life ==
Since retiring from football, Salman has lived in Plymouth. Salman works for the Press Association and focuses on covering Plymouth Argyle's matches. He writes a column in the Plymouth Herald.

== Career statistics ==
Appearances and goals by club, season and competition
Club	Season	League			FA Cup		League Cup		Other		Total	
Club	Season	Division	Apps	Goals	Apps	Goals	Apps	Goals	Apps	Goals	Apps	Goals
Brentford	1975–76	Fourth Division	6	0	0	0	0	0	—		6	0
Brentford	1976–77	Fourth Division	18	1	2	0	2	0	—		22	1
Brentford	1977–78	Fourth Division	37	0	2	0	2	0	—		41	0
Brentford	1978–79	Third Division	40	1	1	0	2	0	—		43	1
Brentford	1979–80	Third Division	41	3	1	0	1	0	—		43	3
Brentford	1980–81	Third Division	38	0	2	0	1	0	—		41	0
Brentford	1981–82	Third Division	40	0	2	0	2	0	—		44	0
Brentford	1982–83	Third Division	1	0	0	0	0	0	—		1	0
Brentford	1983–84	Third Division	21	0	2	0	3	0	1 (Note: Appearances in Football League Trophy)	0	27	0
Brentford	1984–85	Third Division	43	3	4	0	4	0	7	0	58	3
Brentford	1985–86	Third Division	40	0	1	0	2	0	2	0	45	0
Brentford	Total		325	8	17	0	19	0	10	0	371	8
Millwall	1986–87	Second Division	31	2	1	0	3	0	1	0	36	2
Millwall	1987–88	Second Division	36	1	1	0	3	0	3	0	43	1
Millwall	1988–89	First Division	19	0	1	0	2	2	2 (Note: Appearances in Full Members Cup)	0	24	2
Millwall	1989–90	First Division	7	0	2	0	0	0	—		9	0
Millwall	Total		93	3	5	0	8	2	6	0	112	5
Plymouth Argyle	1989–90	Second Division	11	0	—		—		—		11	0
Plymouth Argyle	1990–91	Second Division	35	3	2	0	3	1	1	0	44	4
Plymouth Argyle	1991–92	Second Division	28	1	1	0	2	0	1	0	32	1
Plymouth Argyle	Total		74	4	3	0	5	1	2	0	87	5
Peterborough United (loan)	1991–92	Third Division	1	0	—		—		—		1	0
Torquay United	1992–93	Third Division	20	0	0	0	0	0	0	0	22	0
Career total			513	15	25	0	32	3	18	0	593	18

== Honours ==
Brentford

- Football League Fourth Division fourth-place promotion: 1977–78
- Associate Members' Cup runner-up: 1984–85

Millwall

- Football League Second Division: 1987–88

Individual

- Brentford Supporters' Player of the Year: 1984–85
- Brentford Players' Player of the Year: 1984–85
- Brentford Hall of Fame
- Millwall Player of the Year: 1987–88
