= Gary Phillips (English footballer) =

English football player and manager (born 1961)

Personal information
- Full name: Gary Christopher Phillips
- Date of birth: 20 September 1961 (age 65)
- Place of birth: St Albans, England
- Position: Goalkeeper

Youth career
- 1976–1978: Southampton

Senior career*
Years	Team	Apps	(Gls)
1978	Chalfont St Peter		
1978	Brighton & Hove Albion		
1979–1981	West Bromwich Albion	0	(0)
1981–1984	Barnet	145	(0)
1984–1988	Brentford	143	(0)
1988–1989	Reading	24	(0)
1988	→ Barnet (loan)	2	(0)
1989	→ Hereford United (loan)	6	(0)
1989–1995	Barnet	184	(0)
1996–1997	Aylesbury United		
1997–1999	Aldershot Town	58	(0)
1999–2000	Aylesbury United	36	(0)

International career
- England semi-professional

Managerial career
- 1993–1994: Barnet
- 1996–1997: Aylesbury United
- 1999–2000: Aylesbury United
- 2001: Hemel Hempstead Town
- 2004–2006: Barnet reserves
- 2009: Grays Athletic
- 2009–2010: Hemel Hempstead Town
- * Club domestic league appearances and goals

Gary Christopher Phillips (born 20 September 1961) is an English football coach and former goalkeeper. He is the head of academy goalkeeping at Watford Football Club.

Phillips started his career as a schoolboy at Southampton in 1976. He played at the senior level from 1978 to 2000 at various teams including Barnet, Brentford, and Reading. Philips was voted as Player of the Year for Barnet in 1982, 1984 and 1993 and helped them gain promotion to the Football League in 1991. Philips was also player-manager at Barnet Aylesbury United, and Hemel Hempstead Town.

His coaching career included spells at numerous clubs including Grays Athletic, Hemel Hempstead Town, and Stevenage, as well as multiple returns to Barnet. Philips joined Watford as academy head of goalkeeping for the start of the 2022–23 season.

== Playing career ==
=== Early career ===
Phillips started his footballing life as a centre forward until the age of 13 when he played as goalkeeper for his school team. He represented the South East Schools football team and was invited to join Watford on trial. In 1976, he signed schoolboy terms with Southampton, where he played for two years. He then moved on to play for Chalfont St Peter in non-League, before signing non-contract terms with Brighton & Hove Albion in early 1978 where he stayed for eight months.

=== Club career ===
On his 17th birthday, he signed for West Bromwich Albion, failing to make an appearance, though he worked for the club as a member of the ground staff. Phillips moved to non-League Barnet at the start of 1981. He was voted as Player of the Year for Barnet in 1982 and 1984. He was transfer listed due to financial troubles at Barnet, and therefore sold to Brentford for £5,000 in 1984. During his time with Brentford, Phillips was a runner-up in the Associate Members' Cup when Wigan Athletic defeated Brentford 3–1 at Wembley Stadium.

Phillips then had a spell at Reading, before rejoining Barnet on loan in 1988 to provide cover for injured goalkeepers Steve Humphries and Andy Lomas. He then joined Hereford United on loan in 1989, making six League appearances before signing for Barnet on a permanent basis. During the 1990–91 season, Barnet won the Football Conference and Phillips was an integral part of the team that won promotion into The Football League. Barnet gained promotion during the 1992–93 season, after they finished third in the Third Division, in which Phillips won the Player of the Year for the third season.

== Managerial and coaching career ==
Following the departure of manager Barry Fry to Southend United, Phillps was appointed as player-manager by new chairman Ricky George, at the start of the 1993–94 season. He was replaced by Ray Clemence in January 1994 who was bought in as "general manager", whilst Phillips retained his title of "manager".

On 21 March 1996, Phillips joined Aylesbury United as player-manager, taking over from Steve Ketteridge. He left Aylesbury in November 1997, and had a spell at Aldershot Town. He returned to Aylesbury United as player-manager in October 1999, making a total of 43 appearances in all competitions before leaving in October 2000. In the summer of 2001, he was appointed manager of Hemel Hempstead Town, before quitting 17 games later in November 2001. He has since been on to coach at Queens Park Rangers, Colchester United, Wycombe Wanderers, Luton Town, Southend United and Barnet, as well as managing their reserve side.

Phillips arrived at Grays as a coach, before being promoted to assistant manager in September 2008. He took over from Wayne Burnett as Grays Athletic manager in January 2009, until the end of the 2008–09 season, when he helped Grays to avoid relegation. He was replaced by Craig Edwards for the following 2009–10 season, but remained at Grays as a coach. He was then appointed manager again following Edwards sacking at the start of the next season, taking charge from Grays' first game of the new season. Phillips was placed on gardening leave on 10 September, after the club announced its intent to appoint a new manager a few days prior.

Hemel Hempstead Town announced Phillips had been appointed as manager after former manager Dennis Grenne stepped down. After a poor run of results and leaving Hemel Hempstead Town second from bottom in the Southern Football League, in the relegation zone, Phillips was sacked from his post as manager.

In March 2011, Phillips rejoined Barnet as a goalkeeping coach to aid manager Martin Allen and the club's battle against relegation back to the Conference National.

Phillips joined League One side Stevenage as the club's goalkeeping coach in February 2012. Phillips had previously been assistant manager at Stevenage, having served as Wayne Turner's assistant during Turner's brief spell in-charge of the club in 2002. The move reunited him with manager Gary Smith and assistant Mark Newson, who Phillips had previously managed at Aylesbury United. He left the club when Smith was sacked in March 2013.

Phillips was previously a Youth Development Phase Goalkeeping Coach at Crystal Palace. He joined Watford as academy head of goalkeeping for the start of the 2022–23 season.

== Personal life ==
Phillips was born in St Albans, where he was still living in 2006. He is married with three daughters. His father was a policeman.

== Honours ==
Brentford

- Associate Members' Cup runner-up: 1984–85

Barnet

- Football Conference: 1990–91
- Football League Third Division: third-place promotion: 1992–93
