= Steve Butler (footballer) =

English footballer

Personal information
- Full name: Stephen Butler
- Date of birth: 27 January 1962 (age 64)
- Place of birth: Birmingham, England
- Position: Striker

Senior career*
Years	Team	Apps	(Gls)
1983–1984	Windsor & Eton		
1984–1986	Brentford	23	(3)
1986–1991	Maidstone United	98	(51)
1991–1992	Watford	70	(9)
1992	→ AFC Bournemouth (loan)	1	(0)
1992–1995	Cambridge United	120	(56)
1995–1998	Gillingham	121	(22)
1998–1999	Peterborough United	15	(2)
1999	→ Stevenage Borough (loan)		
1999–2000	Gillingham	13	(2)
2002	Maidstone United	?	
- * Club domestic league appearances and goals

Stephen Butler (born 27 January 1962 in Birmingham) is an English former footballer who played as a striker. During his professional career he played over 400 matches and scored over 150 goals for Brentford, Maidstone United, Watford, AFC Bournemouth, Cambridge United, Gillingham and Peterborough United.

== Club career ==
Butler undertook trials for Gillingham in 1982 and 1983 but the club could not afford to buy him out of the army, where he was working as a vehicle mechanic. He then went on to play for non-league Windsor & Eton and Wokingham Town, before signing for Third Division club Brentford along with Wokingham Town teammate (and fellow soldier) George Torrance in December 1984, with the Griffin Park club paying £400 to buy the pair out of the army.

After failing to hold down a first-team place at Brentford, Butler joined non-league Maidstone United, with whom he won the Conference title and promotion to the Fourth Division in 1989. The Kent side reached the play-offs the following season, but lost to Cambridge United in the semi-finals.

Following a year-spell at Watford, 1992 Butler signed for Second Division side Cambridge United for £75,000 in 1992. He was named as the club's Player of the Season for 1994–95, having scored 18 goals in al competitions.

In December 1995 Butler signed for Gillingham of the Third Division for £100,000, where he remained until leaving for Peterborough United for £5,000 in October 1998.

Butler returned to Gillingham as a coach under Peter Taylor in 1999, having been offered the managerial role himself alongside Andy Hessenthaler. However, he would return to the playing side following injuries to key players including Carl Asaba. In 2000, at the age of 38, Butler scored a 114th minute equaliser in the Second Division play-off final against Wigan Athletic at Wembley, as the Kent club secured its first ever promotion to the second tier of English football.

Butler's playing career ended in non-league football after he returned to former side Maidstone United, where he also served as Director of Football.

== Coaching career ==
Butler served as assistant manager to Peter Taylor, his former manager at Gillingham, during his spells at Leicester City, Hull City and Stevenage Borough.

In June 2007 he was appointed as a first-team coach at Ramsgate.

In October 2010 he returned again to Maidstone United, serving as assistant to Andy Ford in his five month spell as manager.

Butler went on to work as a coach at the Soccer Showcase Elite Training Academy.

== Honours ==
Maidstone United

- Football Conference: 1988–89
- Kent Senior Cup: 1988–89, 1989–90

Gillingham

- Football League Second Division play-offs: 2000

Individual

- PFA Team of the Year: 1990–91 Fourth Division
- Cambridge United Player of the Season: 1994–95
