= Terry Bullivant =

English footballer and manager

Personal information
- Full name: Terence Patrick Bullivant
- Date of birth: 23 September 1956 (age 70)
- Place of birth: Lambeth, England
- Height: 5 ft 7 1/2 in (1.71 m)
- Position: Midfielder

Youth career
- Fulham

Senior career*
Years	Team	Apps	(Gls)
1974–1979	Fulham	101	(2)
1979–1982	Aston Villa	12	(0)
1982–1983	Charlton Athletic	30	(3)
1983	Reading	0	(0)
1983–1986	Brentford	37	(2)

Managerial career
- 1996: Barnet
- 1997: Barnet
- 1997–1998: Reading
- 2001: Crystal Palace (caretaker with Steve Kember)
- 2008–2011: Brentford (assistant)
- 2013–2015: Aldershot Town (assistant)
- * Club domestic league appearances and goals

Terry Bullivant (born 23 September 1956) is an English football manager. During his playing career he was a midfielder, representing Fulham and Aston Villa. Following his retirement as a player he managed Barnet and Reading, while also having a spell as Crystal Palace caretaker manager. After leaving his role as chief scout at Millwall, he joined Sutton United as their Director of Football.

== Career ==
Bullivant signed as an apprentice for Fulham in May 1974, going on to play 115 matches for the club (7 as a substitute) scoring 2 goals. He transferred to Aston Villa for £220,000 in November 1979.

He later managed Barnet and Reading, before resigning following a run of poor results.

He then coached at Brentford, followed by a spell at Crystal Palace, where he briefly took the reins as caretaker manager alongside Steve Kember after Steve Bruce's resignation.

In October 2004 Bullivant left Palace to become first-team coach at Watford, who had lost previous incumbent Terry Burton to Cardiff City. When manager Ray Lewington was relieved of his duties in March 2005, Bullivant became joint caretaker manager alongside Nigel Gibbs. Watford appointed Adrian Boothroyd as Lewington's replacement, and he created a new management team. Bullivant departed without presiding over a single game.

He subsequently joined the coaching staff at Birmingham City, departing in June 2006 when the club undertook a clearout of backroom staff following relegation from the Premier League.

He returned to Brentford on 11 March 2008 as Andy Scott's assistant manager. On 22 February 2013 he was confirmed as Scott's assistant manager at Aldershot. On 16 October 2013 he and Scott signed contracts until June 2016.

On 21 January 2015, Bullivant and Scott were relieved of their duties at Aldershot, after winning only won one of the previous nine matches.

After a period of time as Chief Scout at Millwall, he filled Sutton United's newly created Director of Football role.

== Honours ==
Brentford

- Associate Members' Cup runner-up: 1984–85
