= Francis Joseph (footballer) =

English footballer (1960–2022)

Personal information
- Full name: Francis Joseph
- Date of birth: 6 March 1960
- Place of birth: Kilburn, London, England
- Date of death: 18 November 2022 (aged 62)
- Height: 5 ft 10 in (1.78 m)
- Position: Forward

Youth career
- Willesden
- Wealdstone
- 1979–1980: Hillingdon Borough

Senior career*
Years	Team	Apps	(Gls)
1980–1982	Wimbledon	51	(14)
1981	→ Honka (loan)	14	(7)
1982	→ JYP 77 (loan)	8	(1)
1982–1987	Brentford	110	(44)
1987	→ Wimbledon (loan)	5	(1)
1987	→ HJK Helsinki (loan)	9	(2)
1987–1988	Reading	11	(2)
1988	→ Bristol Rovers (loan)	3	(0)
1988	→ Aldershot (loan)	10	(2)
1988–1989	Sheffield United	13	(3)
1989	Gillingham	18	(1)
1989–1990	Crewe Alexandra	16	(2)
1990	Fulham	4	(0)
1990–1991	Racing Genk	0	(0)
1991	Tampa Bay Rowdies	0	(0)
1991	Barnet	1	(0)
1991–1992	Slough Town	5	(2)
1992	Wokingham Town		
1992	Leatherhead		
1992–1993	Dulwich Hamlet		
1993–1994	Chertsey Town	42	(19)
1994–1995	Walton & Hersham		
1995	Chesham		
1995	Chertsey Town (player-coach)		
- * Club domestic league appearances and goals

Francis Joseph (6 March 1960 – 18 November 2022) was an English professional footballer who played as a forward for a large number of clubs in the Football League, including Wimbledon, Brentford, Reading, Sheffield United, Crewe Alexandra, Fulham, Barnet and Gillingham, between 1980 and 1992. He also spent time playing outside the United Kingdom, including spells with Honka, JYP 77 and HJK Helsinki in Finland, Racing Ghent in Belgium and Tampa Bay Rowdies in the United States. He eventually dropped into non-League football, playing for numerous clubs before becoming a coach at non-League level in 1995.

== Career ==
=== League career ===
Born in Kilburn, London, Joseph began his professional career with Wimbledon in 1980. He scored on his Football League debut, having come on as a substitute in a home game against Darlington. Gaining a regular place in the Wimbledon first team Joseph was voted the club's 'Player of the Year' at the end of his first season. Following loan spells with Honka and JYP 77 in Finland, Joseph moved to Brentford in the summer of 1982 for £40,000, scoring 50 goals during his first two seasons at Griffin Park, before suffering a broken leg September 1984 and a repeat of the injury during the second game of his comeback the following year. Having recovered from his injury late in the 1985–86 season, Joseph never fully regained his form and although making over 100 appearances for Brentford over five years, he left to join Reading for £20,000 in July 1987. Prior to his departure from Brentford, Joseph had spent time on loan back at Wimbledon and at HJK Helsinki in Finland in the early part of 1987, and while at Reading he was also loaned to both Bristol Rovers and Aldershot in 1988.

In July 1988, Joseph's former manager at Wimbledon, Dave Bassett, signed him on a free transfer for Bassett's new side Sheffield United. Joseph again made an impressive start, scoring on his league debut for United against his old club Reading in August 1988 but picked up an injury during the game. Joseph was never able to reclaim a regular place in United's first team and was used only sparingly as United were promoted from Division Three.

From United he headed to Gillingham who paid £5,000 for his services in March 1989, and then played for a number of clubs in rapid succession including Crewe Alexandra, Fulham, Racing Ghent in Belgium, Tampa Bay Rowdies in the United States and Barnet.

=== Non-League career ===
Following his departure from Barnet, Joseph moved between a number of clubs in non-League football including Slough Town, Wokingham Town, Leatherhead, Dulwich Hamlet, Chertsey Town, Walton & Hersham and Chesham before returning to Chertsey Town to become player coach in November 1995. Joseph later became coach of Wealdstone for whom he had played as a teenager.

== Personal life and death ==
Joseph was the older brother of footballer Roger Joseph. Their mother was from Dominica.

Joseph died on 18 November 2022, at the age of 62.

== Honours ==
Wimbledon

- Football League Group Cup runner-up: 1981–82
