= Steve Wignall =

English football player and manager (born 1954)

Personal information
- Full name: Steven Leslie Wignall
- Date of birth: 17 September 1954 (age 72)
- Place of birth: Liverpool, England
- Height: 5 ft 11 in (1.80 m)
- Position: Central defender

Youth career
- 1970–1972: Liverpool

Senior career*
Years	Team	Apps	(Gls)
1972–1977	Doncaster Rovers	130	(1)
1976	→ Nottingham Forest (loan)	0	(0)
1977–1984	Colchester United	281	(22)
1984–1986	Brentford	67	(2)
1986–1991	Aldershot	161	(4)
Total		639	(29)

Managerial career
- 1992–1995: Aldershot Town
- 1995–1999: Colchester United
- 2000: Stevenage Borough
- 2000–2001: Doncaster Rovers
- 2003: Southend United
- * Club domestic league appearances and goals

Steven Leslie Wignall (born 17 September 1954) is an English former professional football manager and player. During his playing career, Wignall, who played as a central defender, made over 600 appearances in the Football League.

== Playing career ==
Born in Liverpool, Wignall played professionally for Doncaster Rovers, Colchester United, Brentford and Aldershot, making a total of 639 appearances in the Football League. He retired as a player in 1991.

In the summer of 1976 Wignall had been signed on loan by Brian Clough for Nottingham Forest, but a suspension held-over from the end of the previous season rendered him ineligible for competitive matches and he returned to Doncaster without ever appearing for Forest, although he did appear in one of Forest's team group photographs.

== Coaching career ==
After his retirement from playing he joined the coaching staff at Aldershot, before assisting Ian McDonald. After Aldershot went out of business in 1992, a new club, Aldershot Town was formed, and Wignall became their first ever manager, winning back to back promotions before former club Colchester United signed him in January 1995. During his time at Colchester he led the club to promotion via the play-offs in 1997/98 and to the final of the Associate Members' Cup the year before. He stayed as manager until he resigned in January 1999, believing he had taken the club as far as he could. In April 2000, he joined Stevenage Borough and was offered a two-year contract but never signed it and, when approached a month later by former club Doncaster Rovers, he decided to manage them instead, having only managed 8 games at Stevenage. He managed Doncaster for just one season. In 2003, he became manager of Southend United but only lasted seven months. He also worked as a first team coach and assistant at Wivenhoe Town from 2005 before leaving club due to financial reasons in January 2008.

In 2009, Wignall published his autobiography titled You Can Have Chips.

== Honours ==
=== As a player ===
Brentford

- Associate Members' Cup runner-up: 1984–85

Aldershot

- Football League Fourth Division play-offs: 1987

=== As a manager ===
Aldershot Town

- Isthmian League Division Three: 1992–93

Colchester United

- Football League Third Division play-offs: 1998
- Football League Trophy runner-up: 1996–97
