= Bob Booker =

English footballer

Bob Booker (English)
Personal information
- Full name: Robert Booker
- Date of birth: 25 January 1958 (age 68)
- Place of birth: Watford, England
- Height: 6 ft 2 in (1.88 m)
- Position: Midfielder

Youth career
- Bedmond Social

Senior career*
Years	Team	Apps	(Gls)
1978–1988	Brentford	231	(42)
1978	→ Barnet (loan)	7	(1)
1988–1991	Sheffield United	109	(13)
1991–1993	Brentford	19	(2)
1993–?	Harrow Borough		
Total		357	(58)

Managerial career
- 2000–2006: Brighton & Hove Albion (assistant manager)
- 2001: Brighton & Hove Albion (caretaker manager)
- 2003: Brighton & Hove Albion (caretaker manager)
- * Club domestic league appearances and goals

Robert Booker (born 25 January 1958) is an English former footballer who primarily played as a midfielder but often filled other roles in his later years. Born in Watford, England he started his career at Brentford in 1978 where he spent ten seasons playing in the lower divisions before switching to Sheffield United with whom he enjoyed his most successful period, gaining two promotions and playing in the top flight. He returned to Brentford for a further two seasons before injuries prompted him to retire. A spell on the coaching staff at Brentford was followed by a period as assistant manager at Brighton & Hove Albion where he was twice installed as caretaker manager during his tenure.

== Playing career ==
=== Brentford ===
Booker was initially spotted by Watford whilst playing for Saturday side Bedmond Social and they invited him to attend a couple of training sessions before he also caught the eye of Brentford and was offered a trial. Despite being a midfielder he was played as a striker in his trial game and duly scored two goals prompting Brentford to offer him a deal. After agreeing a 'fee' with Bedmond, which saw the non-league side receive a set of tracksuits, Booker signed for the Bees and made his Football League debut two days later on 14 October 1978, ironically against his home-town club of Watford.

After a short loan to Conference side Barnet, for whom he scored three goals in 13 appearances, he returned to Brentford and duly scored a hat-trick in his first game back. From this point he became a stalwart of the Brentford first team and would be virtually ever present for the next ten seasons at Griffin Park eventually making over 250 appearances for the Bees. Noted for his versatility, by the time Booker was voted the Bees Player of the Season in 1982 he had played in every position apart from goalkeeper.

Booker's time at Brentford was marred when he suffered a cruciate ligament injury in 1986 which kept him out of the side for nearly 18 months with the surgeons claiming he would never be able to play again. He returned to fitness and played a few first team games but was now deemed surplus to requirements and offered a testimonial game and a free transfer.

=== Sheffield United ===
We've got Bobby Booker,
He's a dirty f_____,
He's six-foot tall;
And he cost f___ all

— A regular chant in honour of
Booker sung by United fans

Booker was considering quitting football, taking the money from the benefit game that Brentford had offered him and putting the money into a window cleaning business. His final contract with Brentford had given him the option of a free transfer should he choose it, in recognition of ten years good service to the club, but it was still something of a surprise when Dave Bassett offered him the chance to move to Sheffield United in 1988 having monitored his progress for a number of years. Blades midfielder Simon Webster had broken his leg and United needed someone to replace him so club physio Derek French, who had played with Booker back in his Bedmond days, contacted him to see if he was interested in a move North. Within 24 hours Booker had signed for the Blades.

Despite being over thirty and managing a recurring knee injury, Booker became a key player for the club after his arrival. He played an important role in the team's rise through the divisions, culminating in promotion to the top flight in 1990. His performances and rapport with supporters made him a popular figure among fans at Bramall Lane. Booker was known for his willingness to spend time talking with supporters. On one occasion, he accepted an invitation from a ten-year-old fan who had written to the club asking him to attend dinner at the fan's home. Booker reportedly stayed for two hours.

Booker continued to be a key player in Division One before injuries finally started to take their toll and he was allowed to return to Brentford in 1991.

=== Return to Brentford ===
Signing a three-year deal with The Bees, nearly five years after they had deemed him surplus to requirements, Booker suffered a difficult return. A squad player he was part of the side that were crowned Division Three champions in 1992 but then suffered an immediate relegation the following year. Booker's knee problems had returned as well, and he was forced to retire in 1993 on his doctor's advice. Booker was inducted into the Brentford Hall of Fame in November 2014.

== Managerial career ==
After drifting out of football for a while Booker eventually took up a coaching post at Brentford in 1994 before being offered the position of assistant manager to Micky Adams at Brighton & Hove Albion in 2000. When Adams left after the side were promoted Booker was made joint caretaker manager along with Martin Hinshelwood before the arrival of Steve Coppell. Remaining at the club he was again called upon to act as caretaker manager in 2003 after Coppell quit to join Reading. New manager Mark McGhee retained Booker as his assistant and the pair remained in charge until McGhee was sacked following a poor start to the 2006–07 season. After a spell managing village side Pease Pottage FC, Booker returned to Brighton along with Micky Adams in 2008 to take up the position of reserve team coach.

Booker now works as a driving instructor and summariser on Brighton & Hove Albion's match commentary.

== Personal life ==
Booker left school at 16 to begin a four-year apprenticeship in an upholstery warehouse whilst playing Saturday football. During his first game for Brentford he was marked by Watford defender Ian Bolton who would eventually join him at Brentford and ironically end up as his brother-in-law.

Following his retirement from playing Booker made occasional appearances as match summariser on BBC Radio Sheffield and married former Southern FM breakfast show host Nicky Keig-Shevlin in 2008.

In July 2017, a biographical book of Booker's life, written with his support, was published. OOH-AAH: The Bob Booker Story ISBN 978-1910515594.

== Honours ==
Brentford

- Football League Third Division: 1991–92
- Associate Members' Cup runner-up: 1984–85
