= 1984–85 Associate Members' Cup =

1984–85 Associate Members Cup
Freight Rover Trophy

Tournament details
- Country: England; Wales

The 1984–85 Associate Members' Cup, known as the 1984–85 Freight Rover Trophy, was the fourth staging of a secondary football league tournament, and the second staging of the Associate Members' Cup, a knock-out competition for English football clubs in the Third Division and the Fourth Division. The winners were Wigan Athletic and the runners-up were Brentford.

The competition began on 22 January 1985 and ended with the final on 1 June 1985 at Wembley Stadium.

In the first round, there were two sections: North and South. In the following rounds each section gradually eliminates teams in knock-out fashion until each has a winning finalist. At this point, the two winning finalists faced each other in the combined final for the honour of the trophy.

== First round ==
=== Northern Section ===
Leg	Date	Home team	Score	Away team
First Leg	22 January	Bolton Wanderers	3–2	Crewe Alexandra
Second Leg	5 February	Crewe Alexandra	0–0	Bolton Wanderers
Bolton Wanderers won 3 – 2 on aggregate
First Leg	22 January	Doncaster Rovers	0–0	York City
Second Leg	5 February	York City	2–0	Doncaster Rovers
York City won 2 – 0 on aggregate
First Leg	22 January	Hull City	2–2	Mansfield Town
Second Leg	6 February	Mansfield Town	2–1	Hull City
Mansfield Town won 4 – 3 on aggregate
First Leg	22 January	Rotherham United	1–1	Chesterfield
Second Leg	5 February	Chesterfield	1–0	Rotherham United
Chesterfield won 2 – 1 on aggregate
First Leg	22 January	Scunthorpe United	1–4	Bradford City
Second Leg	6 February	Bradford City	2–1	Scunthorpe United
Bradford City won 6 – 2 on aggregate
First Leg	23 January	Blackpool	2–1	Tranmere Rovers
Second Leg	29 January	Tranmere Rovers	4–1	Blackpool
Tranmere Rovers won 5 – 3 on aggregate
First Leg	23 January	Hartlepool United	2–1	Lincoln City
Second Leg	6 February	Lincoln City	4–0	Hartlepool United
Lincoln City won 5 – 2 on aggregate
First Leg	29 January	Burnley	5–1	Stockport County
Second Leg	4 February	Stockport County	0–1	Burnley
Burnley won 6 – 1 on aggregate
First Leg	29 January	Wrexham	2–2	Wigan Athletic
Second Leg	5 February	Wigan Athletic	3–1	Wrexham
Wigan Athletic won 5 – 3 on aggregate
First Leg	5 February	Bury	1–1	Chester City
Second Leg	20 February	Chester City	1–2	Bury
Bury won 3 – 2 on aggregate
First Leg	5 February	Rochdale	2–2	Preston North End
Second Leg	19 February	Preston North End	0–1	Rochdale
Rochdale won 3 – 2 on aggregate
First Leg	14 February	Halifax Town	4–1	Darlington
Second Leg	3 March	Darlington	7–0	Halifax Town
Darlington won 8 – 4 on aggregate

=== Southern Section ===
Leg	Date	Home team	Score	Away team
First Leg	22 January	Leyton Orient	0–0	Aldershot
Second Leg	5 February	Aldershot	0–1	Leyton Orient
Leyton Orient won 1 – 0 on aggregate
First Leg	22 January	Newport County	3–0	Exeter City
Second Leg	6 February	Exeter City	1–1	Newport County
Newport County won 4 – 1 on aggregate
First Leg	22 January	Plymouth Argyle	2–1	Bournemouth
Second Leg	5 February	Bournemouth	2–0	Plymouth Argyle
Bournemouth won 3 – 2 on aggregate
First Leg	22 January	Swansea City	2–0	Bristol Rovers
Second Leg	19 March	Bristol Rovers	0–0	Swansea City
Swansea City won 2 – 0 on aggregate
First Leg	22 January	Torquay United	1–1	Swindon Town
Second Leg	6 February	Swindon Town	0–0	Torquay United
Torquay United won 4–3 on penalties (aggregate 1 - 1)
First Leg	23 January	Gillingham	2–2	Colchester United
Second Leg	5 February	Colchester United	2–0	Gillingham
Colchester United won 4 – 2 on aggregate
First Leg	23 January	Peterborough United	2–1	Cambridge United
Second Leg	5 February	Cambridge United	2–0	Peterborough United
Cambridge United won 3 – 2 on aggregate
First Leg	29 January	Port Vale	1–1	Northampton Town
Second Leg	5 February	Northampton Town	1–2	Port Vale
Port Vale won 3 – 2 on aggregate
First Leg	6 February	Derby County	1–0	Walsall
Second Leg	19 February	Walsall	5–3	Derby County
Walsall won 5 – 4 on aggregate
First Leg	6 February	Hereford United	1–1	Bristol City
Second Leg	20 February	Bristol City	1–0	Hereford United
Bristol City won 2 – 1 on aggregate
First Leg	6 February	Reading	1–3	Brentford
Second Leg	26 February	Brentford	2–0	Reading
Brentford won 5 – 1 on aggregate
First Leg	21 February	Southend United	0–2	Millwall
Second Leg	26 February	Millwall	3–1	Southend United
Millwall won 5 – 1 on aggregate

== Second round ==
In this round, in each section, the 6 winners and the 2 "lucky losers" progressed to the quarter-finals. Lucky losers are marked with the letters ^{LL}.

=== Northern Section ===
Date	Home team	Score	Away team
19 February	Bradford City	1–2	Mansfield Town
12 March	Rochdale	0–1	Bolton Wanderers
12 March	York City	1–0	Chesterfield
19 March	Tranmere Rovers	2–2	Burnley^{LL}
Tranmere Rovers won 5–4 on penalties
26 March	Darlington^{LL}	1–3	Lincoln City
2 April	Bury	0–1	Wigan Athletic

=== Southern Section ===
Date	Home team	Score	Away team
19 February	Bournemouth	2–1	Torquay United
12 March	Walsall	1–0	Colchester United
18 March	Bristol City	2–1	Port Vale
19 March	Brentford	1–0	Cambridge United
25 March	Millwall^{LL}	2–3	Leyton Orient
4 April	Newport County^{LL}	0–0	Swansea City
Swansea City won 4–3 on penalties

== Quarter-finals ==
=== Northern Section ===
Date	Home team	Score	Away team
10 April	Mansfield Town	1–1	Burnley
Mansfield Town won 5–4 on penalties
11 April	Wigan Athletic	3–1	Tranmere Rovers
16 April	Bolton Wanderers	2–1	Darlington
22 April	York City	2–3	Lincoln City

=== Southern Section ===
Date	Home team	Score	Away team
11 April	Swansea City	0–2	Brentford
18 April	Bournemouth	2–1	Walsall
23 April	Leyton Orient	4–2	Millwall
25 April	Bristol City	1–2	Newport County

== Area semi-finals ==
=== Northern Section ===
Date	Home team	Score	Away team
8 May	Bolton Wanderers	1–2	Mansfield Town
8 May	Lincoln City	1–3	Wigan Athletic

=== Southern Section ===
Date	Home team	Score	Away team
30 April	Bournemouth	2–3	Brentford
8 May	Leyton Orient	1–1	Newport County
Newport County won 4–2 on penalties

== Area finals ==
=== Northern Area final ===
20 May 1985

Mansfield Town	(1) 1 – 1 (3)	Wigan Athletic
	Report	win on penalties

Field Mill, Mansfield
Attendance: 5,214

=== Southern Area final ===
17 May 1985

Brentford	6–0	Newport County
	Report

Griffin Park, Brentford
Attendance: 8,214

== Final ==
1 June 1985

Wigan Athletic	3–1	Brentford
Newell 27'; Kelly 38'; Lowe 55'		Cooke 52'

Wembley Stadium, London
Attendance: 39,897
Referee: T.Bune (Newbury)

== Notes ==
General

- statto.com

Specific
