= List of Fulham F.C. players (25–99 appearances) =

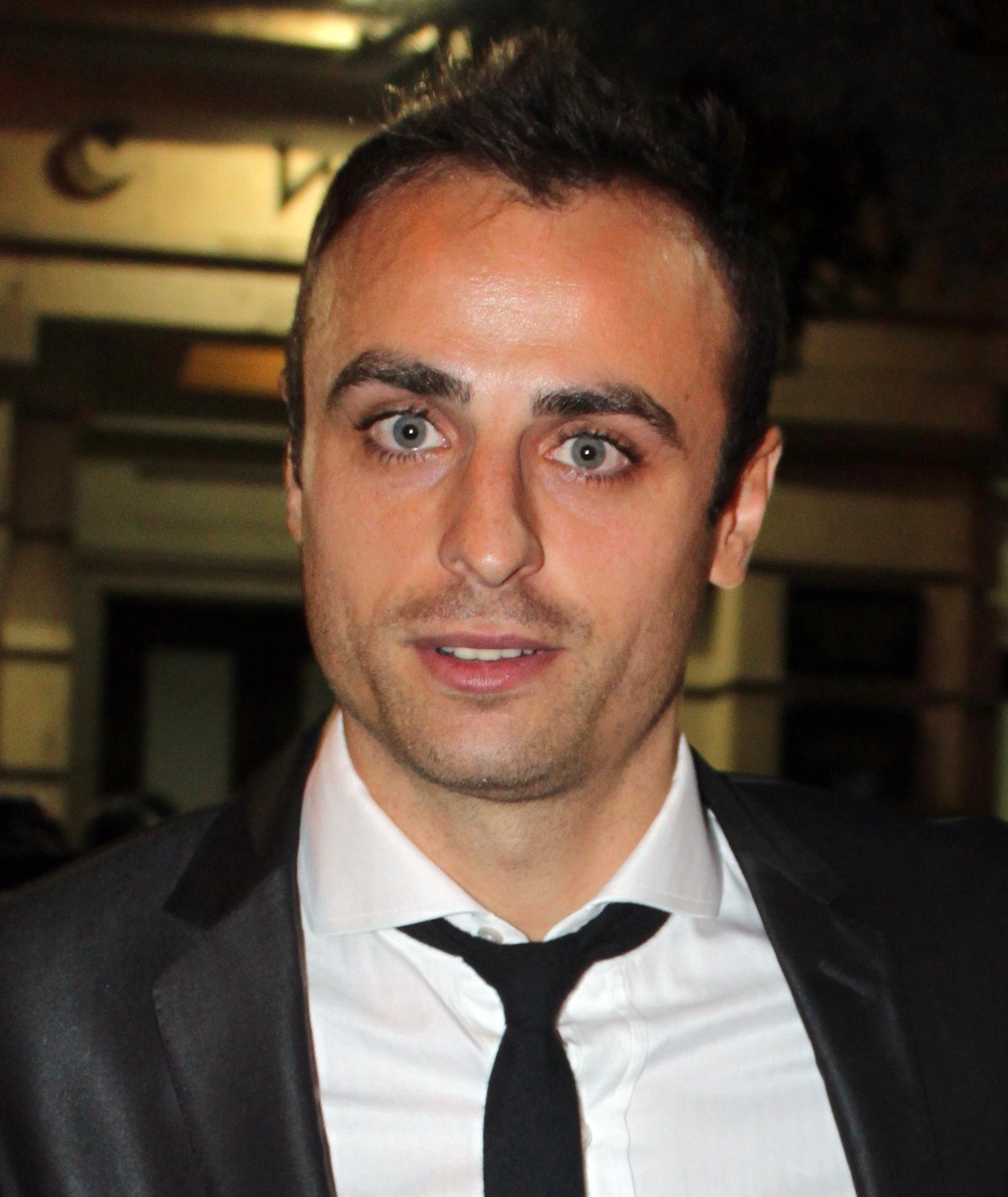
Dimitar Berbatov is one of the most talented players for Fulham who did not quite make the 100 appearance threshold. He won two Premier League titles while he was at Manchester United. He signed for Fulham in 2012 and contributed 20 goals in 54 matches, before he departed for Monaco in 2014.

Fulham Football Club is an English professional football team based in Fulham in the London Borough of Hammersmith and Fulham. The club was formed in West Kensington in 1879 as Fulham St Andrew's Church Sunday School F.C., shortened to Fulham F.C. in 1888. They initially played at Fulham Fields before a move to Craven Cottage in 1896; the club played their first professional match in December 1898 and made their FA Cup debut in the 1902–03 season. The club competed in the Southern Football League between 1898 and 1907, when they were accepted into the Football League Second Division. Having spent much of their history outside the top division, the team gained promotion to the Premier League in 2001. They spent more than ten seasons in the top flight, and reached the final of the UEFA Europa League in 2010. In 2014 they were relegated to the Championship. They have since spent one further season back in the Premier League in 2018–19 but suffered an immediate return to the Championship.

Since the club's first competitive match, 966 players have made an appearance in a competitive match, of which 283 have made between 25 and 99 appearances (including substitute appearances); all players who have reached this milestone are listed below. Jake Iceton, who played in goal in the 1930s, holds the highest number of appearances (99) amongst those who have played less than 100 matches for the club. Kenny Achampong, Gavin Nebbeling and Bert Pearce all made 97 appearances for Fulham. Calvin Bassey, Alex Iwobi and Bernd Leno are the current squad members who have played between 25 and 99 matches for Fulham.

== Players ==
This list contains the 284 players, including three current squad members, as of 19 May 2024, who have made between 25 and 99 appearances for Fulham, ordered by the years in which they played for the club and then alphabetically by surname. The figure for league appearances and goals comprise those in the Southern Football League, the Football League and the Premier League. Total appearances and goals comprise those in the Southern Football League, Football League (including play-offs), Premier League, FA Cup, Football League Cup, Football League Trophy, UEFA Intertoto Cup and UEFA Cup/Europa League. Wartime matches are regarded as unofficial and are excluded, as are matches from the abandoned 1939–40 season. Statistics for the Watney Cup and Anglo-Scottish Cup are not included in the table. International appearances and goals are given for the senior national team only, although appearances at a lower international level are noted.

Figures are mostly taken from Fulham: The Complete Record by Dennis Turner (published in 2007). UEFA Intertoto Cup and UEFA Cup/Europa League appearance statistics for 2002–03 and 2009–10 are taken from Soccerbase, along with all other statistics from the 2007–08 season onwards.

This article is about players who have made between 25 and 99 appearances for Fulham. For other Fulham players, see Category:Fulham F.C. players. For the current Fulham first-team squad, see Fulham F.C.#Current squad.

Statistics are correct as of 19 May 2024. International statistics correct as of 26 March 2024.

Positions key
Pre-1960s		Post-1960s	
GK	Goalkeeper		
FB	Full back	DF	Defender
HB	Half back	MF	Midfielder
FW	Forward		

Symbol	Meaning
‡	Fulham player in the 2024-25 season.
*	Player has left Fulham but is still playing professional football.
^	Player is currently playing international football.
♦	Player went on to manage the club.
(c)	Player captained the side.
Fulham career	The year of the player's first appearance for Fulham to the year of his last appearance
Apps	Number of appearances for Fulham, both starting and as a substitute
Int. apps	Appearances for his country's senior international team
Int. country	Flag only shown when a player has represented his country
Int. goals	Goals scored for his country's senior international team

Name	Position	Fulham career	League apps	League goals	Total apps	Total goals	Int. country (Note: Where a player did not compete internationally, no country is denoted. Between 1926 and 1950, two competing teams claimed to represent the island of Ireland. Where an Irish player from this period played for both teams, no flag is given. denotes players who played for the Irish Football Association team. denotes players who played for the Football Association of Ireland team. For more information, see Ireland national football team (1882–1950) and Republic of Ireland national football team.)	Int. apps	Int. goals	Notes	Refs
Frank Doyle	FW	1903–1904	30	9	31	9	None	0	0	—	
Harry Fletcher	FW	1903–1904	40	14	47	19	None	0	0	—	
Everard Lawrence	FW	1903–1904	18	2	25	3	None	0	0	—	
Willie Orr	FB	1903–1904	26	0	33	0	None	0	0	—	
Peter Gray	FB	1903–1905	43	1	52	1	None	0	0	—	
Harry Robotham	FW	1903–1905	34	0	39	1	None	0	0	—	
Albert Soar	HB	1903–1906	71	6	86	6	None	0	0	—	
Robert Haworth	FB	1904–1905	33	0	42	0	None	0	0	—	
William Lennie	FW	1904–1905	17	3	26	4	None	0	0	—	
Willie Wardrope	FW	1904–1906	58	29	69	32	None	0	0	—	
Mark Bell	HB	1904–1907	58	6	61	6	Scotland	1	0	—	
Harry Thorpe	FB	1904–1907	70	0	80	0	None	0	0	—	
Alex Fraser	HB	1904–1908	79	24	91	28	None	0	0	—	
Bob Graham	FW	1906–1907	24	0	32	1	None	0	0	—	
RC Hamilton	FW	1906–1907	29	11	33	11	Scotland	11	15	—	
Bert Kingaby	FW	1906–1907	33	3	37	3	None	0	0	—	
Fred Wheatcroft	FW	1906–1907	23	9	27	9	None	0	0	—	
Walter Freeman	HB	1906–1909	57	22	63	25	None	0	0	—	
Charlie Millington	HB	1907–1909	57	18	65	22	None	0	0	—	
Leslie Skene	GK	1907–1910	88	0	94	0	None	0	0	—	
Harry Lee	FW	1907–1915	65	31	65	31	None	0	0	—	
Archie Lindsay	FB	1907–1911	80	1	86	1	None	0	0	—	
Fred Mouncher	HB	1907–1911	42	9	51	10	None	0	0	—	
Harry Brown	FW	1908–1910	53	21	55	21	None	0	0	—	
Bert Lipsham	HB	1908–1910	56	5	59	5	England	1	0	—	
Jack Goldie	FB	1908–1911	31	0	33	0	None	0	0	—	
Arthur Brown	HB	1910–1912	41	9	46	12	None	0	0	—	
Tommy Burns	FB	1910–1913	35	0	36	0	None	0	0	—	
Wilf Nixon	GK	1910–1922	27	0	29	0	None	0	0	—	
Bert Pearce	FW	1911–1915	90	48	97	50	None	0	0	—	
Archie Gray	FB	1912–1915	24	0	25	0	Scotland	1	0	—	
Ernest Coquet	FB	1913–1920	37	0	49	0	None	0	0	—	
Jack Houghton	FB	1913–1921	63	0	64	0	None	0	0	—	
Will Taylor	HB	1913–1924	48	8	50	10	None	0	0	—	
Fred Linfoot	FW	1914–1920	40	4	40	4	None	0	0	—	
George Martin	HB	1916–1925	48	0	50	0	None	0	0	—	
Harold Crockford	FW	1917–1922	26	9	26	9	None	0	0	—	
Billy Banks	HB	1919–1921	40	12	43	12	None	0	0	—	
Donald Cock	HB	1919–1922	87	43	94	44	None	0	0	—	
Ted Worrall	FB	1919–1923	88	0	96	0	None	0	0	—	
Jack Papworth	FW	1919–1925	39	16	40	16	None	0	0	—	
Joe Edelston	FB	1920–1925	67	0	71	0	None	0	0	—	
Peter Gavigan	HB	1920–1925	72	1	78	1	None	0	0	—	
Harvey Darvill	HB	1921–1924	69	10	75	10	None	0	0	—	
Andy Ducat ♦	FB	1921–1924	64	0	69	0	England	6	1	(Note: Andy Ducat became Fulham manager in 1924 immediately after retiring from the game. He would remain in charge until 1926.)	
Frank Osborne ♦	FW	1921–1924	67	18	70	18	England	4	3	(Note: Frank Osborne managed Fulham twice, from 1948 to 1949 and again from 1956 to 1958)	
Alf Kingsley	FW	1922–1923	29	2	31	2	None	0	0	—	
Jimmy Croal	FW	1922–1924	36	6	36	6	Scotland	3	0	—	
James Riddell	FB	1923–1925	37	0	42	0	None	0	0	—	
Bill Prouse	HB	1924–1927	76	30	83	31	None	0	0	—	
Albert Pape	FW	1925–1927	42	12	48	16	None	0	0	—	
Tommy Wolfe	FW	1925–1927	27	2	27	2	None	0	0	—	
Jack Harris	HB	1925–1928	42	3	47	3	None	0	0	—	
Sid Elliott	FW	1927–1928	42	26	43	26	None	0	0	—	
Jack Smith	FW	1926–1928	34	9	34	9	None	0	0	—	
Alex Steele	FB	1927–1930	49	0	53	0	None	0	0	—	
Sid Bird	FB	1927–1932	43	0	46	0	None	0	0	—	
Fred Avey	FW	1928–1932	62	28	68	29	None	0	0	—	
Bill Mason	GK	1928–1929	33	0	33	0	None	0	0	—	
Bertie Rosier	FB	1928–1930	52	0	57	0	None	0	0	—	
Syd Binks	FB	1929–1930	27	0	29	0	None	0	0	—	
Jake Iceton	GK	1930–1935	90	0	99	0	None	0	0	—	
Frank Newton	FW	1931–1935	83	77	88	81	None	0	0	—	
Billy Richards	HB	1931–1935	76	14	82	15	None	0	0	—	
Eddie Perry	FW	1931–1938	64	36	69	40	Wales	3	1	—	
Jack Lambert	FW	1933–1935	34	4	36	5	None	0	0	—	
Ernie Hiles	FB	1934–1948	49	0	49	0	None	0	0	—	
Arthur Warburton	FW	1934–1938	36	6	37	6	None	0	0	—	
Bob Dennison	FW	1935–1939	42	12	48	16	None	0	0	—	
Dennis Higgins	HB	1935–1939	30	12	32	12	None	0	0	—	
Viv Woodward	HB	1935–1947	92	25	95	25	None	0	0	(Note: Played for Fulham during the Second World War.)	
Taffy O'Callaghan	FW	1937–1939	39	6	42	7	Wales	12	0	—	
Hugh Turner	GK	1937–1939	68	0	71	0	None	0	0	—	
Jim Evans	FB	1937–1946	71	5	74	5	None	0	0	—	
Ernie Shepherd	HB	1938–1948	72	13	76	13	None	0	0	—	
Harry Wallbanks	FB	1938–1949	33	1	37	1	None	0	0	—	
Syd Thomas	HB	1938–1950	57	4	61	4	None	0	0	—	
Doug Flack	GK	1938–1953	54	0	55	0	None	0	0	—	
Jack Watson	FW	1946–1948	71	2	72	3	None	0	0	—	
Ted Hinton	GK	1946–1949	82	0	86	0	Ireland	7	0	—	
Ron Lewin	FB	1946–1950	41	0	42	0	None	0	0	—	
Bill Pavitt	FB	1946–1952	50	1	52	1	None	0	0	—	
Tommy Lawson	FB	1947–1951	30	2	33	2	None	0	0	—	
Arthur Rowley	FW	1948–1950	56	26	59	26	None	0	0	—	
Jack McDonald	HB	1948–1952	75	19	78	20	None	0	0	—	
Norman Smith	FB/DF	1948–1960	60	0	63	0	None	0	0	—	
Hugh Kelly	GK	1949–1950	25	0	25	0	Republic of Ireland	4	0	—	
Johnny Campbell	FW	1949–1953	62	4	68	6	None	0	0	—	
Bobby Brennan	FW	1950–1953	73	13	80	16	None	0	0	—	
Reg Lowe	FB	1950–1953	66	0	72	0	None	0	0	—	
Archie Macaulay	HB	1950–53	49	4	53	4	None	0	0	—	
Jimmy Bowie	HB	1951–1952	34	7	38	7	None	0	0	—	
Gordon Brice	FB	1952–1956	87	1	93	1	None	0	0	—	
Ken Collins	FB/DF	1952–1961	32	0	33	0	None	0	0	—	
David Edwards	FB/DF	1952–1964	38	0	41	0	None	0	0	—	
John Chenhall	FB	1953–1958	73	13	80	16	None	0	0	—	
Tony Barton	HB	1954–1959	49	8	49	8	None	0	0	—	
John Doherty	FW	1954–1962	49	7	51	8	None	0	0	—	
Derek Lampe	FB/DF	1954–1964	88	0	96	0	None	0	0	—	
Ron Greenwood	FB	1955–1956	42	0	42	0	England	0	0	(Note: Represented England at B team level.)	
Ken Hewkins	GK	1955–1962	38	0	41	0	None	0	0	—	
Mike Johnson	FW	1958–1962	23	6	27	7	None	0	0	—	
Dave Metchick	MF	1961–1964	47	9	56	13	None	0	0	—	
Jackie Henderson	FW	1962–1964	45	7	55	9	Scotland	9	1	—	
Rodney Marsh	FW	1962–1966; 1976–1977	79	27	90	28	England	9	1	—	
Bobby Howfield	MF	1963–1965	26	9	30	10	None	0	0	—	
Brian Nichols	DF	1963–1968	51	1	57	1	None	0	0	—	
Jack McClelland	GK	1964–1969	51	0	57	0	Northern Ireland	6	0	—	
Terry Dyson	FW	1965–1968	23	3	28	6	None	0	0	—	
Mark Pearson	MF	1965–1968	58	7	66	7	None	0	0	—	
John Ryan	DF	1965–1969	47	1	55	1	None	0	0	—	
Ian Seymour	GK	1966–1971	64	0	75	0	None	0	0	—	
Mike Pentecost	DF	1966–1973	87	0	95	0	None	0	0	—	
Joe Gilroy	FW	1967–1968	24	8	28	8	None	0	0	—	
Dave Roberts	DF	1967–1971	22	0	25	0	Wales	17	0	—	
Frank Large	FW	1968–1969	24	3	28	3	None	0	0	—	
Cliff Jones	FW	1968–1970	25	2	26	2	Wales	59	16	—	
Vic Halom	FW	1968–1971	72	22	82	25	None	0	0	—	
David Moreline	DF	1968–1974	70	0	82	0	None	0	0	—	
John Gilchrist	DF	1969–1970	23	1	27	1	None	0	0	—	
Stan Horne	DF	1969–1973	79	0	87	0	None	0	0	—	
John Richardson	DF	1969–1973	71	6	80	7	None	0	0	—	
George Johnston	FW	1970–1972	39	12	42	13	None	0	0	—	
Roger Cross	FW	1971–1972	40	8	46	10	None	0	0	—	
John Conway	MF	1971–1975	38	6	45	7	None	0	0	—	
John Fraser	DF	1971–1976	56	1	66	1	None	0	0	—	
Paul Went	DF	1972–1974	58	3	67	5	England	0	0	(Note: Represented England at under-18 level.)	
John Dowie	MF	1973–1977	37	2	50	3	None	0	0	—	
Ernie Howe	DF	1973–1977	70	10	84	12	None	0	0	—	
John Margerrison	MF	1975–1979	71	9	79	11	None	0	0	—	
Brian Greenaway	MF	1975–1992	85	8	95	9	None	0	0	—	
George Best	MF	1976–1978	42	8	47	10	Northern Ireland	37	9	—	
Teddy Maybank	FW	1976–1980	46	17	50	19	None	0	0	—	
Steve Hatter	DF	1976–1983	26	1	32	1	None	0	0	—	
Ray Evans	DF	1977–1979	86	6	89	6	None	0	0	—	
Tony Mahoney	FW	1977–1982	59	10	69	13	None	0	0	—	
Chris Guthrie	FW	1978–1980	50	15	55	15	None	0	0	—	
Geoff Banton	DF	1978–1982	38	3	46	3	None	0	0	—	
Gary Peters	DF	1979–1990	75	4	87	4	None	0	0	—	
Ronny Goodlass	FW	1980–1982	22	2	27	2	None	0	0	—	
Peter O'Sullivan	MF	1981–1983	46	1	55	1	Wales	3	1	—	
Cliff Carr	DF	1982–1987	73	13	80	16	England	0	0	(Note: Represented England at under-21 level.)	
Tony Sealy	FW	1983–1985	25	11	25	11	None	0	0	—	
Brian Cottington	DF	1983–1988	73	1	85	1	None	0	0	—	
Wayne Kerrins	DF	1983–1989	66	1	76	1	None	0	0	—	
Kenny Achampong	FW	1984–1988	81	15	97	20	None	0	0	—	
Jim Hicks	DF	1985–1988	40	1	43	1	None	0	0	—	
Leo Donnellan	MF	1985–1990	79	4	91	4	None	0	0	—	
Chris Pike	FW	1985–1990	42	4	46	5	None	0	0	—	
Keith Oakes	DF	1986–1988	76	3	84	4	None	0	0	—	
John Vaughan	GK	1986–1988	44	0	55	0	None	0	0	—	
Kevin Hoddy	MF	1986–1989	22	1	29	1	None	0	0	—	
Shaun Gore	DF	1986–1991	26	0	32	1	None	0	0	—	
Richard Langley	DF	1986–1991	50	0	57	0	England	0	0	—	
Michael Cole	FW	1987–1991	50	4	53	4	None	0	0	—	
Ronnie Mauge	MF	1988–1990	52	2	57	2	Trinidad and Tobago	8	1	—	
Andy Sayer	FW	1989–1990	54	16	63	16	England	0	0	—	
Steve Milton	FW	1989–1991	58	9	62	9	None	0	0	—	
Gavin Nebbeling	DF	1989–1993	88	2	97	2	None	0	0	—	
Gary Cobb	MF	1990–1992	22	0	25	0	None	0	0	—	
Stacey North	DF	1990–1992	38	0	41	0	None	0	0	—	
Kelly Haag	FW	1990–1993	67	9	71	9	None	0	0	—	
Mark Kelly	MF	1990–1993	64	2	70	2	None	0	0	—	
Udo Onwere	MF	1990–1994	85	7	93	7	None	0	0	—	
Martin Ferney	MF	1990–1995	60	1	68	1	None	0	0	—	
Andy Cole	FW	1991; 2004–2005	44	15	54	17	England	15	1	—	
Peter Baah	FW	1992–1994	49	4	53	4	None	0	0	—	
Ara Bedrossian	MF	1993–1995	42	1	44	1	None	0	0	—	
Robert J. Haworth	FW	1993–1995	21	1	27	3	None	0	0	—	
Michael Mison	MF	1993–1997	55	5	69	6	None	0	0	—	
Rory Hamill	FW	1994–1996	48	7	56	10	Northern Ireland	1	0	—	
Terry Hurlock	MF	1994–1996	27	1	37	1	None	0	0	—	
Kevin Moore	DF	1994–1996	51	4	64	6	None	0	0	—	
Micky Adams ♦	FW	1994–1997	29	8	37	13	None	0	0	(Note: Micky Adams served in the capacity of player-manager for Fulham in the 1996–97 season, guiding them to promotion from the Third Division. He went on to a similar role at Swansea City for 3 games the following season before he took over at Brentford.)	
Tony Lange	GK	1995–1997	59	0	70	0	None	0	0	—	
Rod McAree	MF	1995–1998	28	3	34	3	None	0	0	—	
Paul Brooker	MF	1995–2000	56	4	63	4	None	0	0	—	
Glenn Cockerill	MF	1996–1997	39	1	46	1	None	0	0	—	
Paul Watson	DF	1996–1997	50	4	55	5	None	0	0	—	
Richard Carpenter	MF	1996–1998	58	7	64	9	None	0	0	—	
Danny Cullip	DF	1996–1998	50	2	61	2	None	0	0	—	
Darren Freeman	FW	1996–1998	46	9	48	10	None	0	0	—	
Rob Scott	DF	1996–1998	81	16	95	17	None	0	0	—	
Mark Walton	GK	1996–1998	40	0	45	0	Wales	0	0	(Note: Represented Wales at Under-21 level.)	
Matt Lawrence	DF	1997–1998	61	0	68	0	None	0	0	—	
Paul Bracewell ♦	MF	1997–1999	64	1	76	1	England	3	0	(Note: Paul Bracewell was elevated from Kevin Keegan's assistant to Fulham's permanent manager in 1999, Keegan leaving the club after winning promotion to the First Division. He was replaced temporarily at the end of March 2000 by Karl-Heinz Riedle before Jean Tigana in April.)	
Neil Smith	MF	1997–1999	75	1	90	2	None	0	0	—	
Peter Beardsley	FW	1997–1999	22	5	27	6	England	59	9	—	
Paul Moody	FW	1997–1999	40	19	49	20	None	0	0	—	
Alan Neilson	DF	1997–2001	29	2	39	2	Wales	5	0	—	
Geoff Horsfield	FW	1998–2000	59	22	74	31	None	0	0	—	
Dirk Lehmann	FW	1998–1999	26	2	35	5	None	0	0	—	
Gus Uhlenbeek	MF	1998–2000	39	1	49	1	None	0	0	—	
Wayne Collins	MF	1998–2001	60	4	79	8	None	0	0	—	
Karl-Heinz Riedle ♦	FW	1999–2001	34	6	36	6	Germany	42	16	(Note: Karl-Heinz Riedle became temporary manager for a brief period at the start of April 2000 after Paul Bracewell left his post. Jean Tigana took over on 9 April.)	
Fabrice Fernandes	MF	2000–2001	29	2	38	4	None	0	0	—	
John Collins	MF	2000–2003	65	3	79	4	Scotland	58	12	—	
Andrejs Štolcers	FW	2000–2004	25	2	33	4	Latvia	81	7	—	
Jon Harley	DF	2001–2004	25	1	36	1	England	0	0		
Steve Marlet	FW	2001–2005	55	11	78	19	France	23	6	—	
Abdeslam Ouaddou	DF	2001–2005	21	0	38	0	Morocco	57	3	—	
Junichi Inamoto *	MF	2002–2003; 2003–2004	41	4	58	9	Japan	83	5	—	
Martin Djetou	MF	2002–2003; 2003–2004	51	1	66	1	France	6	0	—	
Facundo Sava	FW	2002–2006	26	6	42	7	None	0	0	—	
Zesh Rehman *	MF	2003–2006	21	0	32	1	Pakistan ^	18	1	—	
Mark Pembridge	MF	2003–2007	45	1	54	2	Wales	54	6	—	
Liam Rosenior	DF	2003–2007	79	0	92	1	England	0	0		
Papa Bouba Diop	MF	2004–2007	76	8	84	9	Senegal	63	11	—	
Claus Jensen	MF	2004–2007	35	4	40	5	Denmark	47	8	—	
Ian Pearce	DF	2004–2008	57	1	62	1	England	0	0		
Michael Brown	MF	2005–2007	41	0	44	0	England	0	0		
Heiðar Helguson	FW	2005–2007	57	11	63	14	Iceland	55	12	—	
Antti Niemi	GK	2005–2007	62	0	63	0	Finland	67	0	—	
Philippe Christanval	DF	2005–2008	36	1	40	1	France	5	0	—	
Tony Warner	GK	2005–2008	21	0	26	0	Trinidad and Tobago	2	0	—	
Matthew Briggs *	DF	2006–2014	13	0	29	1	Guyana ^	4	0		
Franck Queudrue	DF	2006–2007	29	1	32	1	France	0	0	(Note: Represented the France B national team.)	
Wayne Routledge *	MF	2006–2007	24	0	28	1	England	0	0		
Jimmy Bullard	MF	2006–2009	39	6	41	7	None	0	0	—	
Steven Davis *	MF	2007–2008	22	0	25	0	Northern Ireland ^	111	12	—	
David Healy	FW	2007–2008	30	4	34	6	Northern Ireland	95	36	—	
Diomansy Kamara	FW	2007–2011	59	12	68	18	Senegal	51	9	—	
Alexei Smertin	MF	2007–2008	22	0	25	0	Russia	55	0	—	
Ki-Hyeon Seol	MF	2007–2010	18	1	26	2	South Korea	82	19	—	
David Stockdale *	GK	2008–2014	39	0	52	0	England	0	0	(Note: Represented the England C team.)	
John Paintsil	DF	2008–2011	75	0	91	0	Ghana	89	0	—	
Erik Nevland	FW	2008–2010	52	9	67	10	Norway	8	0	—	
Jonathan Greening	MF	2009–2011	33	1	50	2	England	0	0		
Stephen Kelly *	DF	2009–2012	44	0	71	0	Republic of Ireland	39	0	—	
Bjørn Helge Riise *	MF	2009–2012	18	0	35	0	Norway ^	35	1	—	
Mousa Dembélé *	FW	2010–2012	62	5	74	7	Belgium ^	80	5	—	
Alexander Kačaniklić *	FW	2010–2016	79	10	95	11	Sweden	19	3	—	
Carlos Salcido ‡	DF	2010–2012	23	0	25	0	Mexico	124	10	—	
Kerim Frei *	DF	2011–2013	23	0	33	1	Turkey ^	5	0	—	
Pajtim Kasami *	MF	2011–2014	38	3	55	1	Switzerland ^	12	2	—	
Philippe Senderos *	DF	2011–2014	46	1	53	1	Switzerland ^	57	5	—	
Cauley Woodrow *	FW	2011–2019	54	8	65	12	England ^	0	0	(Note: Represented England at under-17 level.)	
Ashkan Dejagah *	MF	2012–2014	43	5	49	5	Iran ^	57	11	—	
Sascha Riether	DF	2012–2014	66	1	72	1	Germany	2	0	—	
Hugo Rodallega *	FW	2012–2015	75	15	88	20	Colombia	43	8	—	
Dimitar Berbatov	FW	2012–2014	51	19	54	20	Bulgaria	78	48	—	
Giorgos Karagounis	MF	2012–2014	39	1	47	3	Greece	139	10	—	
Kieran Richardson *	MF	2012–2014	45	5	48	6	England	8	2	—	
Fernando Amorebieta *	DF	2013–2016	30	2	34	2	Venezuela	15	1	—	
Darren Bent	MF	2013–2014	24	3	30	6	England	13	4	—	
Dan Burn *	DF	2013–2016	61	1	69	2	None	0	0	—	
Moussa Dembélé *	FW	2013–2016	56	15	64	19	France ^	0	0	(Note: Represented France at under-17 level.)	
Nikolay Bodurov *	DF	2014–2016	41	1	49	1	Bulgaria ^	41	2	—	
Lasse Vigen Christensen *	MF	2014–2017	56	6	68	7	Denmark	0	0	(Note: Represented Denmark at under-21 level.)	
Seko Fofana *	MF	2014–2015	21	1	25	1	Ivory Coast ^	1	0	(Note: Represented France at under-19 level.)	
Tim Hoogland *	DF	2014–2015	25	4	28	4	Germany	0	0	(Note: Represented Germany at under-20 level.)	
Shaun Hutchinson*	DF	2014–2016	34	2	42	2	None	0	0	—	
Emerson Hyndman *	MF	2014–2016	25	1	28	1	United States ^	2	0	—	
Seán Kavanagh *	DF	2014–2018	21	1	27	1	Republic of Ireland	0	0	(Note: Represented Republic of Ireland at under-21 level.)	
Matt Smith *	FW	2014–2017	50	9	52	9	None	0	0	—	
Konstantinos Stafylidis *	DF	2014–2015	38	0	44	0	Greece ^	26	2	—	
Ryan Tunnicliffe *	MF	2014–2017	59	2	66	2	England	0	0		
Luke Garbutt *	DF	2015–2016	24	1	25	1	England	0	0		
Andy Lonergan *	GK	2015–2016	29	0	31	0	England	0	0	(Note: Represented England at under-20 level.)	
Jamie O'Hara *	MF	2015–2016	37	1	39	1	England	0	0		
Jazz Richards *	DF	2015–2016	22	0	25	0	Wales ^	14	0	—	
Richard Stearman *	DF	2015–2017	29	0	32	0	None	0	0	—	
Sone Aluko *	FW	2016–2017	45	8	50	9	Nigeria ^	7	2	(Note: Represented England at under-19 level.)	
Scott Malone *	DF	2016–2017	36	6	42	6	England	0	0		
Chris Martin *	FW	2016–2017	31	10	34	11	Scotland ^	17	3	—	
David Button *	GK	2016–2018	60	0	61	0	England	0	0		
Tomáš Kalas *	DF	2016–2018	69	1	76	1	Czech Republic	19	2	—	
Michael Madl *	DF	2016–2018	29	1	32	1	Austria	1	0	—	
Lucas Piazon *	MF	2016–2018	51	10	58	12	Brazil ^	0	0	(Note: Represented Brazil at under-23 level.)	
Floyd Ayité *	FW	2016–2019	76	14	84	14	Togo ^	39	11	—	
Aboubakar Kamara ‡	FW	2017–2021	47	10	55	12	Mauritania ^	0	0	—	
Rui Fonte *	FW	2017–2019	28	3	29	3	Portugal	0	0	(Note: Represented Portugal at under-21 level.)	
Oliver Norwood *	MF	2017–2018	36	5	41	5	Northern Ireland	53	0	—	
André-Frank Zambo Anguissa *	MF	2018–2022	61	0	66	0	Cameroon ^	58	5	—	
Cyrus Christie *	DF	2018–2022	52	1	63	2	Republic of Ireland ^	30	2	—	
Maxime Le Marchand *	DF	2018–2021	40	0	48	0	None	0	0	—	
Jean Michaël Seri *	MF	2018–2022	65	2	70	2	Ivory Coast ^	58	4	—	
Calum Chambers *	DF	2018–2019	31	2	32	2	England ^	3	0	—	
Sergio Rico *	GK	2018–2019	30	0	33	0	Spain ^	1	0	—	
André Schürrle *	FW	2018–2019	24	6	25	6	Germany	57	22	—	
Bernd Leno ‡	GK	2022–present	74	0	78	0	Germany	9	o	—	
João Palhinha *	MF	2022–2024	68	7	79	8	Portugal ^	31	2	—	
Calvin Bassey ‡	DF	2023–present	29	1	32	1	Nigeria ^	25	0	—	
Alex Iwobi ‡	MF	2023–present	30	5	33	6	Nigeria ^	80	10	—	
