= 1993–94 Fulham F.C. season =

Fulham
1993–94 season
- Manager: Don Mackay
- Stadium: Craven Cottage
- Second Division: 21st
- FA Cup: First round
- League Cup: Second round
- Football League Trophy: Southern Section Semi Final

During the 1993–94 English football season, Fulham F.C. competed in the Division Two.

== Final league table ==
Pos	Team	Pld	W	D	L	GF	GA	GD	Pts	Promotion or relegation
19	Cardiff City	46	13	15	18	66	79	−13	54	
20	Blackpool	46	16	5	25	63	75	−12	53	
21	Fulham (R)	46	14	10	22	50	63	−13	52	Relegation to the Third Division
22	Exeter City (R)	46	11	12	23	52	83	−31	45	Relegation to the Third Division
23	Hartlepool United (R)	46	9	9	28	41	87	−46	36	Relegation to the Third Division

(R) Relegated

== Results ==
Fulham's score comes first

=== Legend ===
Win	Draw	Loss

=== Football League Third Division ===
Date	Opponent	Venue	Result	Attendance
14 August 1993	Hartlepool United	A	1–0	2,542
21 August 1993	Cardiff City	H	1–3	5,696
28 August 1993	Bristol Rovers	A	1–2	5,261
31 August 1993	Wrexham	H	0–0	3,685
4 September 1993	Bradford City	H	1–1	4,221
11 September 1993	Burnley	A	1–3	9,021
14 September 1993	Barnet	A	2–0	3,066
18 September 1993	York City	A	0–1	3,595
25 September 1993	Huddersfield Town	A	0–1	5,616
2 October 1993	Leyton Orient	H	2–3	4,417
9 October 1993	Bournemouth	H	0–2	4,004
16 October 1994	Hull City	A	1–1	6,089
23 October 1993	Stockport County	H	0–1	3,615
30 October 1993	Reading	A	0–1	7,020
2 November 1993	Exeter City	A	4–6	2,919
6 November 1993	Brighton & Hove Albion	H	0–1	4,383
20 November 1993	Rotherham United	A	2–1	2,667
27 November 1993	Swansea City	H	3–1	3,282
11 December 1993	Cardiff City	A	0–1	5,120
17 December 1993	Hartlepool United	H	2–0	2,998
27 December 1993	Port Vale	H	0–0	5,760
28 December 1993	Plymouth Argyle	A	1–3	15,609
1 January 1994	Brentford	H	0–0	9,797
3 January 1994	Cambridge United	A	0–3	4,557
8 January 1994	Blackpool	A	3–2	3,374
15 January 1994	Hull City	H	0–1	4,407
22 January 1994	Bournemouth	A	3–1	5,464
30 February 1994	Reading	H	1–0	6,911
5 February 1994	Stockport County	A	4–2	5,488
12 February 1994	Blackpool	H	1–0	4,259
19 February 1994	Bristol Rovers	H	0–1	5,063
22 February 1994	Wrexham	A	0–2	2,094
5 March 1994	Burnley	H	3–2	4,943
12 March 1994	York City	A	0–2	3,572
15 March 1994	Barnet	H	3–0	3,326
19 March 1994	Huddersfield Town	H	1–1	3,624
26 March 1994	Leyton Orient	A	2–2	5,096
29 March 1994	Cambridge United	H	0–2	3,444
2 April 1994	Port Vale	A	2–2	7,380
4 April 1994	Plymouth Argyle	H	1–1	5,819
9 April 1994	Brentford	A	2–1	6,638
13 April 1994	Bradford City	A	0–0	5,015
16 April 1994	Exeter City	H	0–2	4,602
23 April 1994	Brighton & Hove Albion	A	0–2	10,606
30 April 1994	Rotherham United	H	1–0	5,217
7 May 1994	Swansea City	A	1–2	4,355

=== FA Cup ===
Round	Date	Opponent	Venue	Result
R1	15 November 1993	Yeovil Town	A	0–1

=== League Cup ===
Round	Date	Opponent	Venue	Result	Attendance	Notes
R1 1st Leg	17 August 1993	Colchester United	H	2–1	2,820	
R1 2nd Leg	24 August 1993	Colchester United	A	2–1	3,360	Fulham won 4-2 on aggregate
R2 1st Leg	22 September 1993	Liverpool	H	1–3	13,599	
R2 2nd Leg	5 October 1993	Liverpool	A	0–5	12,541	Liverpool won 8-1 on aggregate

=== Football League Trophy ===
Round	Date	Opponent	Venue	Result	Attendance	
SR1	28 September 1993	Brighton & Hove Albion	H	4–1	1,135	
SR1	10 November 1993	Reading	A	0–1	2,034	
SR2	1 December 1993	Bristol Rovers	A	2–2	2,882	Fulham won 4-3 on penalties
SQF	11 December 1993	Reading	H	1–0	2,864	
SSF	8 February 1994	Wycombe Wanderers	H	2–2	8,733	Wycombe won 4-2 on penalties

== Squad ==
Note: Flags indicate national team as defined under FIFA eligibility rules; some limited exceptions apply. Players may hold more than one non-FIFA nationality.

No.	Pos.	Nation	Player
—	GK	(England) ENG	Lee Harrison
—	GK	(England) ENG	Jim Stannard
—	DF	(England) ENG	Jeff Eckhardt
—	DF	(England) ENG	Glen Thomas
—	DF	(England) ENG	Robbie Herrera
—	DF	(England) ENG	Terry Angus
—	DF	(England) ENG	Simon Morgan
—	DF	(England) ENG	John Marshall
—	DF	(England) ENG	Duncan Jupp
—	DF	(England) ENG	Martin Pike
—	MF	(England) ENG	Martin Ferney

No.	Pos.	Nation	Player
—	MF	(England) ENG	Julian Hails
—	MF	(England) ENG	Paul Kelly
—	MF	(England) ENG	Udo Onwere
—	MF	(Cyprus) CYP	Ara Bedrossian
—	MF	(England) ENG	Mark Cooper
—	MF	(England) ENG	Michael Mison
—	MF	(England) ENG	Peter Baah
—	MF	(England) ENG	Lee Tierling
—	FW	(England) ENG	Gary Brazil
—	FW	(England) ENG	Sean Farrell
—	FW	(England) ENG	Rob Haworth
—	FW	(England) ENG	Paul Mahorn (on loan from Tottenham Hotspur)
