= 1993–94 Barnet F.C. season =

Barnet
1993–94 season
- Chairman: Ricky George
- Manager: Gary Phillips; Ray Clemence (from January)
- Stadium: Underhill Stadium
- Second Division: 24th (relegated)
- FA Cup: Third round
- League Cup: Second round
- Autoglass Trophy: First round
- Top goalscorer: League: Haag (8); All: Haag (11)
- Average home league attendance: 2,421

During the 1993–94 English football season, Barnet F.C. competed in the Football League Second Division.

== Squad ==
Note: Flags indicate national team as defined under FIFA eligibility rules; some limited exceptions apply. Players may hold more than one non-FIFA nationality.

No.	Pos.	Nation	Player
-	GK	ENG	Andy Pape
-	GK	ENG	Gary Phillips (player-manager)
-	DF	ENG	Geoff Cooper
-	DF	ENG	Mark Newson
-	DF	ENG	Alan Walker
-	DF	ENG	Tim Alexander
-	DF	ENG	Dave Barnett
-	DF	ENG	Paul Haylock
-	DF	ENG	David McDonald
-	DF	ENG	Rob Mutchell
-	DF	ENG	Russell Edwards
-	DF	ENG	Gregor Rioch (on loan from Luton Town)
-	MF	ENG	Paul Wilson
-	MF	ENG	Micky Tomlinson
-	MF	ENG	Peter Scott
-	MF	ENG	Carl Hoddle

No.	Pos.	Nation	Player
-	MF	ENG	Tony Lynch
-	MF	ENG	Brian Marwood
-	MF	ENG	Tony Dolby (on loan from Millwall)
-	MF	ENG	Gary Smith
-	MF	ENG	Tony Finnigan
-	MF	ENG	Louis Affor
-	MF	ENG	Mark Hall (on loan from Southend United)
-	FW	ENG	Mark Carter
-	FW	ENG	Nicky Evans
-	FW	ENG	Kelly Haag
-	FW	ENG	Terry Gibson
-	FW	ENG	Shaun Close
-	FW	ENG	Zeke Rowe (on loan from Chelsea)
-	FW	ENG	Danny Dichio (on loan from QPR)
-	FW	ENG	Ben Barnett

== Season summary ==
In the 1993–94 season, Barnet goalkeeper Gary Phillips took over as manager during a difficult summer in which the club marginally survived a vote of expulsion by a Football League EGM, and lost the vast majority of their promotion winning side in a tribunal which nullified the players' contracts. Phillips cobbled together a squad from the few remaining players and free transfers. In January 1994 Phillips was assisted by former England goalkeeper Ray Clemence, but were still relegated from Division Two.

== Final league table ==
Pos	Team	Pld	W	D	L	GF	GA	GD	Pts	Promotion or relegation
20	Blackpool	46	16	5	25	63	75	−12	53	
21	Fulham (R)	46	14	10	22	50	63	−13	52	Relegation to the Third Division
22	Exeter City (R)	46	11	12	23	52	83	−31	45	Relegation to the Third Division
23	Hartlepool United (R)	46	9	9	28	41	87	−46	36	Relegation to the Third Division
24	Barnet (R)	46	5	13	28	41	86	−45	28	Relegation to the Third Division

(R) Relegated

== Results ==
Barnet's score comes first

=== Legend ===
Win	Draw	Loss

=== Football League Second Division ===
Date	Opponent	Venue	Result	Attendance	Scorers
14 August 1993	Hull City	H	1–2	2,129	Walker
21 August 1993	Port Vale	A	0–6	7,538	
28 August 1993	Swansea City	H	0–1	1,996	
1 September 1993	Reading	A	1–4	4,971	Haag
4 September 1993	Blackpool	A	1–3	4,328	Evans
11 September 1993	Bournemouth	H	1–2	12,049	Evans
14 September 1993	Fulham	H	0–2	3,066	
18 September 1993	Leyton Orient	A	2–4	4,812	D Barnett, Haag (pen)
25 September 1993	Wrexham	A	0–4	3,767	
2 October 1993	Bristol Rovers	H	1–2	3,158	Haag
10 October 1993	Cardiff City	H	0–0	2,084	
16 October 1993	Huddersfield Town	A	2–1	5,614	Finnigan, Haag
23 October 1993	Cambridge United	H	2–3	2,997	Cooper (2)
30 October 1993	Brentford	A	0–1	5,873	
2 November 1993	Hartlepool United	A	1–2	1,960	Evans
6 November 1993	Bradford City	H	1–2	2,350	Close
20 November 1993	York City	A	1–1	2,966	Haag
27 November 1993	Rotherham United	H	2–1	1,938	Rowe, Haag
11 December 1993	Port Vale	H	2–3	3,100	Rowe, Haag
18 December 1993	Hull City	A	4–4	4,115	Hoddle, Lynch (2), Scott
27 December 1993	Brighton & Hove Albion	A	0–1	10,053	
29 December 1993	Burnley	H	1–1	2,363	Close
1 January 1994	Stockport County	A	1–2	5,121	Haag (pen)
15 January 1994	Huddersfield Town	H	0–1	3,022	
22 January 1994	Cardiff City	A	0–0	5,698	
29 January 1994	Brentford	H	0–0	2,502	
5 February 1994	Cambridge United	A	1–1	3,473	Gibson
12 February 1994	Plymouth Argyle	H	0–0	2,854	
18 February 1994	Swansea City	A	0–2	3,278	
26 February 1994	Blackpool	H	0–1	2,448	
5 March 1994	Bournemouth	A	1–1	3,407	Cooper
8 March 1994	Plymouth Argyle	A	0–1	7,595	
12 March 1994	Leyton Orient	H	3–1	2,717	Newson, Lynch, Gibson
15 March 1994	Fulham	A	0–3	3,326	
19 March 1994	Wrexham	H	1–2	1,853	Scott
22 March 1994	Exeter City	H	2–1	1,604	Gibson, Dolby
26 March 1994	Bristol Rovers	A	2–5	3,802	Edwards, Wilson
29 March 1994	Exeter City	A	0–0	2,269	
2 April 1994	Brighton & Hove Albion	H	1–1	2,733	Dichio
4 April 1994	Burnley	A	0–5	10,412	
9 April 1994	Stockport County	H	0–0	1,798	
12 April 1994	Reading	H	0–1	2,289	
26 April 1994	Hartlepool United	H	3–2	1,351	Wilson (2, 1 pen), Dichio
30 April 1994	York City	H	1–3	2,363	Gibson
3 May 1994	Bradford City	A	1–2	3,472	Dolby
7 May 1994	Rotherham United	A	1–1	3,674	Newson

=== FA Cup ===
Round	Date	Opponent	Venue	Result	Attendance	Goalscorers
R1	13 November 1993	Carshalton Athletic	H	2–1	2,690	Haag, Close
R2	4 December 1993	Crawley Town	A	2–1	4,104	Hoddle, Rowe
R3	8 January 1994	Chelsea	H	0–0	23,200	
R3R	19 January 1994	Chelsea	A	0–4	16,209	

=== League Cup ===
Round	Date	Opponent	Venue	Result	Attendance	Goalscorers
R1 1st Leg	18 August 1993	Southend United	A	2–0	3,249	Walker, Lynch
R1 2nd Leg	24 August 1993	Southend United	H	1–1 (won 3–1 on agg)	2,471	Haag
R2 1st Leg	21 September 1993	Queens Park Rangers	H	1–2	3,569	Lynch
R2 2nd Leg	6 October 1993	Queens Park Rangers	A	0–4 (lost 1–6 on agg)	6,314	

=== Football League Trophy ===
Round	Date	Opponent	Venue	Result	Attendance	Goalscorers
S Group 7	28 September 1993	Wycombe Wanderers	A	0–1	2,323	
S Group 7	19 October 1993	Brentford	H	2–2	1,269	Walker, Haag
