= 1994–95 Fulham F.C. season =

Fulham
1994–95 season
- Manager: Ian Branfoot
- Stadium: Craven Cottage
- Third Division: 8th
- FA Cup: Second round
- League Cup: Second round
- Football League Trophy: Second round

During the 1994–95 English football season, Fulham F.C. competed in the Division Three.

== Final league table ==
Pos	Team	Pld	W	D	L	GF	GA	GD	Pts	Promotion or relegation
6	Mansfield Town	42	18	11	13	84	59	+25	65	Qualification for the Third Division play-offs
7	Scunthorpe United	42	18	8	16	68	63	+5	62	
8	Fulham	42	16	14	12	60	54	+6	62	
9	Doncaster Rovers	42	17	10	15	58	43	+15	61	
10	Colchester United	42	16	10	16	56	64	−8	58	

== Results ==
Fulham's score comes first

=== Legend ===
Win	Draw	Loss

=== Football League Third Division ===
Date	Opponent	Venue	Result	Attendance
13 August 1994	Walsall	H	1–1	5,308
20 August 1994	Scunthorpe United	A	2–1	3,165
27 August 1994	Wigan Athletic	H	2–0	4,241
30 August 1994	Doncaster Rovers	A	0–0	3,003
3 September 1994	Torquay United	A	1–2	4,739
10 September 1994	Preston North End	H	0–1	5,001
13 September 1994	Scarborough	H	1–2	2,729
17 September 1994	Walsall	A	1–5	3,378
24 September 1994	Hereford United	H	1–1	3,740
1 October 1994	Barnet	A	0–0	3,579
8 October 1994	Rochdale	A	2–1	2,573
15 October 1994	Exeter City	H	4–0	4,314
22 October 1994	Chesterfield	A	1–1	2,860
29 October 1994	Carlisle United	H	1–3	5,563
5 November 1994	Northampton Town	A	1–0	7,366
19 November 1994	Lincoln City	H	1–1	3,955
26 November 1994	Bury	A	0–0	3,323
10 December 1994	Scunthorpe United	H	1–0	3,358
17 December 1994	Wigan Athletic	A	1–1	1,791
26 December 1994	Gillingham	A	1–4	4,677
27 December 1994	Colchester United	H	1–2	4,243
31 December 1994	Hartlepool United	A	2–1	1,698
2 January 1995	Mansfield Town	H	4–2	4,151
8 January 1995	Chesterfield	H	1–1	3,927
14 January 1995	Darlington	A	0–0	2,113
28 January 1995	Carlisle United	A	1–1	6,891
4 February 1995	Bury	H	1–0	3,941
14 February 1995	Northampton Town	H	4–4	3,423
18 February 1995	Darlington	H	3–1	3,864
25 February 1995	Barnet	H	4–0	6,195
4 March 1995	Hereford United	A	1–1	2,895
11 March 1995	Preston North End	A	2–3	8,601
18 March 1995	Doncaster Rovers	H	0–2	4,031
25 March 1995	Torquay United	H	2–1	4,941
1 April 1995	Scarborough	A	1–3	2,050
8 April 1995	Hartlepool United	H	1–0	3,465
11 April 1995	Lincoln City	A	0–2	2,932
15 April 1995	Colchester United	A	2–5	3,448
17 April 1995	Gillingham	H	1–0	3,612
22 April 1995	Mansfield Town	A	1–1	2,861
29 April 1995	Exeter City	A	1–0	3,388
6 May 1995	Rochdale	H	5–0	4,342

=== FA Cup ===
Round	Date	Opponent	Venue	Result
R1	12 November 1994	Ashford Town	A	2–2
R1R	22 November 1994	Ashford Town	H	5–3
R2	3 December 1995	Gillingham	A	1–1
R2R	13 December 1995	Gillingham	H	1–2

=== League Cup ===
Round	Date	Opponent	Venue	Result	Attendance	Notes
R1 1st Leg	16 August 1994	Luton Town	A	1–1	3,287	
R1 2nd Leg	23 August 1994	Luton Town	H	1–1	5,134	2-2 on aggregate; Fulham won 4-3 on penalties
R2 1st Leg	20 September 1994	Stoke City	H	3–2	3,721	
R2 2nd Leg	28 September 1994	Stoke City	A	0–1	7,440	3-3 on aggregate; Stoke City won on the away goals rule

=== Football League Trophy ===
Round	Date	Opponent	Venue	Result	Attendance
SR1	18 October 1994	Leyton Orient	A	2–5	1,282
SR1	8 November 1994	Colchester United	H	3–2	1,451
SR2	29 November 1994	Leyton Orient	A	0–1	1,575

== Squad ==
Note: Flags indicate national team as defined under FIFA eligibility rules; some limited exceptions apply. Players may hold more than one non-FIFA nationality.

No.	Pos.	Nation	Player
—	GK	(England) ENG	Lee Harrison
—	GK	(England) ENG	Jim Stannard
—	GK	(England) ENG	John Gregory
—	DF	(England) ENG	Micky Adams
—	DF	(England) ENG	Mark Blake
—	DF	(England) ENG	Robbie Herrera
—	DF	(England) ENG	Glen Thomas
—	DF	(England) ENG	Terry Angus
—	DF	(England) ENG	Kevin Moore
—	DF	(England) ENG	Simon Morgan
—	DF	(England) ENG	John Marshall
—	DF	(England) ENG	Duncan Jupp
—	MF	(Cyprus) CYP	Ara Bedrossian

No.	Pos.	Nation	Player
—	MF	(England) ENG	Danny Bolt
—	MF	(England) ENG	Nick Cusack
—	MF	(England) ENG	Martin Ferney
—	MF	(England) ENG	Tony Finnigan
—	MF	(England) ENG	Julian Hails
—	MF	(Northern Ireland) NIR	Rory Hamill
—	MF	(England) ENG	Terry Hurlock
—	MF	(England) ENG	Michael Mison
—	MF	(England) ENG	Martin Thomas
—	FW	(England) ENG	Gary Brazil
—	FW	(England) ENG	Carl Bartley
—	FW	(England) ENG	Alan Cork
—	FW	(England) ENG	Rob Haworth
—	FW	(England) ENG	Mark Stallard (on loan from Derby County)
