= List of Dagenham & Redbridge F.C. seasons =

This is a list of all seasons played by Dagenham & Redbridge F.C. in English football, from their inaugural season in 1992–93.

== Seasons ==
Season	League									FA Cup	League Cup	Other		Top league scorer		Average attendance
Season	Division (Note: Divisions are sorted according to their level within the English football league system at the time.)	P	W	D	L	F	A	Pts	Pos	FA Cup	League Cup	Competition	Result	Name	Goals	Average attendance
1992–93	Conference	42	19	11	12	75	47	67	3rd	R1	—	FA Trophy Bob Lord Challenge Trophy	R2 SF	Paul Cavell	19	1,201
1993–94	Conference	42	15	14	13	62	54	59	6th	QR4	—	FA Trophy Bob Lord Challenge Trophy	R1 R3	David Crown; Paul Cavell	9	952
1994–95	Conference	42	13	13	16	56	59	52	15th	QR2	—	FA Trophy Bob Lord Challenge Trophy	R1 SF	Ian Richardson	10	944
1995–96	Conference ↓	42	7	12	23	43	73	33	22nd	QR3	—	FA Trophy Bob Lord Challenge Trophy	R1 SF	Kelly Haag	8	788
1996–97	Isthmian Premier	42	18	11	13	57	43	65	4th	R1	—	FA Trophy Isthmian League Cup	F^{[A]} R2	Vinnie John	12	627
1997–98	Isthmian Premier	42	21	10	11	73	50	73	4th	R2	—	FA Trophy Isthmian League Cup	R2 R3	Paul Cobb	24	802
1998–99	Isthmian Premier	42	20	13	9	71	44	73	3rd	QR4	—	FA Trophy Isthmian League Cup	R5 R2	Paul Cobb	21	723
1999–2000	Isthmian Premier ↑	42	32	5	5	97	35	101	1st	QR3	—	FA Trophy Isthmian League Cup	R1 R2	Paul Cobb	18	1,079
2000–01	Conference	42	23	8	11	71	54	77	3rd	R3	—	FA Trophy Bob Lord Challenge Trophy	R3 R1	Junior McDougald; Danny Shipp	9	1,247
2001–02	Conference	42	24	12	6	70	47	84	2nd^{[B]}	R3	—	Football League Trophy FA Trophy	QF(S) R4	Mark Stein	24	1,915
2002–03	Conference	42	21	9	12	71	59	72	5th^{[C]}	R4	—	Football League Trophy FA Trophy	R1 R4	Mark Stein; Steve West	16	1,599
2003–04	Conference	42	15	9	18	59	64	54	13th	QR4	—	Football League Trophy FA Trophy	R2 R3	Chris Moore	10	1,443
2004–05	Conference	42	19	8	15	68	60	65	11th	R1	—	Football League Trophy FA Trophy Conference Cup	R1 R3 R3	Chris Moore	19	1,378
2005–06	Conference	42	16	10	16	63	59	58	10th	R1	—	Football League Trophy FA Trophy	R1 QF	Chris Moore	15	1,242
2006–07	Conference ↑	46	28	11	7	93	48	95	1st	QR4	—	FA Trophy	R2	Paul Benson	28	1,756
2007–08	League 2	46	13	10	23	49	70	49	20th	R3	R1	Football League Trophy	QF(S)	Ben Strevens	15	2,007
2008–09	League 2	46	19	11	16	77	53	68	8th	R2	R1	Football League Trophy	QF(S)	Paul Benson	18	2,041
2009–10	League 2 ↑	46	20	12	14	69	58	72	7th^{[D]}	R1	R1	Football League Trophy	R1	Paul Benson	17	2,098
2010–11	League 1 ↓	46	12	11	23	52	70	47	21st	R1	R1	Football League Trophy	R1	Romain Vincelot	12	2,769
2011–12	League 2	46	14	8	24	50	72	50	19th	R3	R1	Football League Trophy	R2	Brian Woodall	11	2,090
2012–13	League 2	46	13	12	21	55	62	51	22nd	R1	R1	Football League Trophy	R2	Luke Howell	9	1,903
2013–14	League 2	46	15	15	16	53	59	60	9th	R1	R1	Football League Trophy	QF(S)	Rhys Murphy	13	1,920
2014–15	League 2	46	17	8	21	58	59	59	14th	R1	R1	Football League Trophy	R2	Jamie Cureton	19	2,040
2015–16	League 2 ↓	46	8	10	28	46	81	34	23rd	R3	R1	Football League Trophy	QF(S)	Christian Doidge	8	1,979
2016–17	National League	46	26	6	14	79	53	84	4th^{[E]}	R1	—	FA Trophy	R1	Oliver Hawkins	18	1,379
2017–18	National League	46	19	11	16	69	62	68	11th	QR4	—	FA Trophy	R1	Michael Cheek	13	1,463
2018–19	National League	46	15	11	20	50	56	56	18th	QR4	—	FA Trophy	R2	Conor Wilkinson	12	1,423
2019–20	National League	37	11	11	15	40	44	44	17th †	QR4	—	FA Trophy	R2	Angelo Balanta	7	1,416
2020–21	National League	42	17	9	16	53	48	60	12th	R2	—	FA Trophy	R4	Paul McCallum	15	773*
2021–22	National League	44	22	7	15	80	53	73	8th	R1	—	FA Trophy	QF	Paul McCallum	18	1,770
2022–23	National League	46	18	9	19	61	72	63	10th	R2	—	FA Trophy	R4	Josh Walker; Junior Morias	10	1,752
2023–24	National League	46	14	14	18	69	63	56	15th	QR4	—	FA Trophy	R3	Inih Effiong; Josh Rees	16	1,640
2024–25	National League ↓	46	12	16	18	61	62	52	21st	R3	—	FA Trophy National League Cup	R3 Group			

== Key ==
Winners	Runners up	Promoted ↑	Relegated ↓

Division shown in bold when it changes due to promotion, relegation or league reorganisation.
League record shown in italics when season was abandoned.

Key to league record:

- P = Played
- W = Games won
- D = Games drawn
- L = Games lost
- F = Goals for
- A = Goals against
- Pts = Points
- Pos = Final position
- ↑ = Promoted
- ↓ = Relegated
- * = Dagenham & Redbridge had points deducted
- † = Season abandoned, final table decided by points-per-game

Key to divisions:

- League 1 = Football League One
- League 2 = Football League Two
- Conference = Conference National
- Isthmian Premier = Isthmian League Premier Division

Key to cup rounds:

- — = Dagenham & Redbridge did not enter the competition
- QR2 = Second Qualifying Round
- QR3 = Third Qualifying Round
- QR4 = Fourth Qualifying Round
- R1 = First Round
- R2 = Second Round
- R3 = Third Round
- R4 = Fourth Round
- R5 = Fifth Round
- QF = Quarter Final
- SF = Semi Final
- F = Final
- QF(S) = Quarter Final Southern Section

== Footnotes ==
A. : Dagenham & Redbridge lost 1–0 in the FA Trophy final to Woking at Wembley Stadium.
B. : Dagenham & Redbridge missed out on the Conference National title to Boston United on goal difference.
C. : Dagenham & Redbridge lost 3–2 (after extra time) in the 2003 Football Conference play-off final to Doncaster Rovers at Britannia Stadium.
D. : Dagenham & Redbridge won 3–2 in the 2010 Football League Two play-off final against Rotherham United at Wembley Stadium.
E. : Dagenham & Redbridge lost 3–1 on aggregate in the 2016–17 National League play-off semi-final to Forest Green Rovers.
