= 1990–91 Fulham F.C. season =

Fulham
1990–91 season
- Manager: Alan Dicks
- Third Division: 21st
- FA Cup: Second Round
- Rumbelows Cup: First Round
- Leyland DAF Cup: First Round (Southern Section)
- Top goalscorer: League: Gordon Davies (6); All: Gordon Davies (7)
- Highest home attendance: 6,590 vs Leyton Orient (11 May 1991)
- Lowest home attendance: 2,736 vs Peterborough United (27 August 1990)

The 1990–91 season was Fulham's 96th season as a professional football club in the Football League. They competed in the Third Division for the fifth successive season.

Prior to the start of the season, manager Ray Lewington was demoted to assistant manager and replaced by Alan Dicks. Fulham finished in 21st place in the table, narrowly avoiding relegation to the Fourth Division. In the FA Cup they reached the second round, beating Farnborough Town in the first round but losing a second round replay against Cambridge. They were knocked out in the first round of the Football League Cup by Peterborough United

== Fourth Division ==
Date	Opponents	H / A	Result F–A	Scorers	Attendance	League position
25 August 1990	Crewe Alexandra	A	1–1	Marshall	4,143	11th
1 September 1990	Cambridge United	H	0–2		4,145	21st
8 September 1990	Shrewsbury Town	A	2–2	Pike, Haag	2,929	20th
15 September 1990	Huddersfield Town	H	0–0		3,853	19th
18 September 1990	Wigan Athletic	H	1–2	Thomas	3,041	23rd
22 September 1990	Preston	A	0–1		4,691	23rd
29 September 1990	Bournemouth	A	0–3		5,855	24th
2 October 1990	Birmingham City	H	2–2	Brazil, Rosenior	4,011	24th
6 October 1990	Rotherham United	H	2–0	Rosenior, Davies	3,498	22nd
13 October 1990	Stoke City	A	1–2	Rosenior	12,394	23rd
20 October 1990	Swansea City	A	2–2	Brazil, Davies	4,500	22nd
23 October 1990	Bury	H	2–0	Newson, Morgan	3,439	20th
27 October 1990	Exeter City	H	3–2	Pike, Davies (2)	4,523	20th
4 November 1990	Leyton Orient	A	0–1		6,163	20th
10 November 1990	Southend United	A	1–1	Brazil	5,808	20th
24 November 1990	Tranmere Rovers	H	1–2	Davies	4,194	20th
1 December 1990	Reading	A	0–1		4,073	21st
15 December 1990	Bolton Wanderers	H	0–1		3,466	22nd
22 December 1990	Mansfield Town	A	1–1	Eckhardt	2,838	23rd
26 December 1990	Bradford City	H	0–0		3,029	23rd
29 December 1990	Chester City	H	4–1	Skinner (2), Scott, Brazil	3,084	20th
1 January 1991	Grimsby Town	A	0–3		7,492	20th
12 January 1991	Cambridge United	A	0–1		5,087	20th
19 January 1991	Crewe Alexandra	H	2–1	Eckhardt, Davies	3,477	20th
26 January 1991	Huddersfield Town	A	0–1		4,369	20th
2 February 1991	Wigan Athletic	A	0–2		2,258	20th
5 February 1991	Preston	H	1–0	Stant	2,750	20th
16 February 1991	Tranmere Rovers	A	1–1	Stant	5,211	20th
23 February 1991	Southend United	H	0–3		5,113	20th
2 March 1991	Reading	H	1–1	Stant	4,475	20th
9 March 1991	Bolton Wanderers	A	0–3		7,316	20th
12 March 1991	Birmingham City	A	0–2		8,083	21st
16 March 1991	Bournemouth	H	1–1	Talbot	4,085	20th
19 March 1991	Stoke City	H	0–1		3,131	22nd
23 March 1991	Rotherham United	A	1–3	Scott	3,188	23rd
30 March 1991	Bradford City	A	0–0		6,207	22nd
1 April 1991	Mansfield Town	H	1–0	Stant	3,555	20th
6 April 1991	Chester City	A	0–1		1,047	22nd
9 April 1991	Shrewsbury Town	H	4–0	Skinner (2), Baker, Marshall	3,415	20th
13 April 1991	Grimsby Town	H	0–0		5,464	20th
16 April 1991	Brentford	A	2–1	Haag, Stant	7,839	20th
20 April 1991	Swansea City	H	1–1	Haag	4,208	20th
23 April 1991	Brentford	H	0–1		6,765	20th
27 April 1991	Bury	A	1–1	Pike	3,217	21st
4 May 1991	Exeter City	A	1–0	Skinner	3,799	21st
11 May 1991	Leyton Orient	H	1–1	Onwere	6,590	21st

Pos	Club	Pld	W	D	L	F	A	GD	Pts
20	Swansea City	46	13	9	24	49	72	−23	48
21	Fulham	46	10	16	20	41	56	−15	46
22	Crewe Alexandra	46	11	11	24	62	80	−18	44

Pld = Matches played; W = Matches won; D = Matches drawn; L = Matches lost; F = Goals for; A = Goals against; GD = Goal difference; Pts = Points

=== Results summary ===
Overall								Home						Away					
Pld	W	D	L	GF	GA	GD	Pts	W	D	L	GF	GA	GD	W	D	L	GF	GA	GD
46	10	16	20	41	56	−15	46	8	8	7	27	22	+5	2	8	13	14	34	−20

Last updated: 11 May 1991.
Source: soccerbase.com

Round	1	2	3	4	5	6	7	8	9	10	11	12	13	14	15	16	17	18	19	20	21	22	23	24	25	26	27	28	29	30	31	32	33	34	35	36	37	38	39	40	41	42	43	44	45	46
Ground	A	H	A	H	H	A	A	H	H	A	A	H	H	A	A	H	A	H	A	H	H	A	A	H	A	A	H	A	H	H	A	A	H	H	A	A	H	A	H	H	A	H	H	A	A	H
Result	D	L	D	D	L	L	L	D	W	L	D	W	W	L	D	L	L	L	D	D	W	L	L	W	L	L	W	D	L	D	L	L	D	L	L	D	W	L	W	D	W	D	L	D	W	D
Position	11	21	20	19	23	23	24	24	22	23	22	20	20	20	20	20	21	22	23	23	20	20	20	20	20	20	20	20	20	20	20	21	20	22	23	22	20	22	20	20	20	20	20	21	21	21

Updated to match(es) played on 11 May 1991. Source: soccerbase.com
A = Away; H = Home; W = Win; D = Draw; L = Loss

== FA Cup ==
Date	Round	Opponents	H / A	Result F – A	Scorers	Attendance
17 November 1990	Round 1	Farnborough Town	H	2–1	Pike, Brazil	4,990
7 December 1990	Round 2	Cambridge United	H	0–0		5,929
11 November 1990	Round 2 Replay	Cambridge United	A	1–2	Davies	4,966

== Rumbelows Cup ==
Date	Round	Opponents	H / A	Result F–A	Scorers	Attendance
27 August 1990	Round 1 First leg	Peterborough United	H	1–2	Joseph	2,736
3 September 1990	Round 2 Second leg	Peterborough United	A	0–2		2,968

== Leyland DAF Trophy ==
Date	Round	Opponents	H / A	Result F–A	Scorers	Attendance
12 November 1990	Preliminary Round (Group Stage)	Leyton Orient	A	2–0		
27 November 1990	Preliminary Round (Group Stage)	Brentford	H	1–1		
19 February 1991	First Round (South)	Mansfield Town	A	1–2		

Team	Pld	W	D	L	GF	GA	GD	Pts
1. Brentford	2	1	1	0	3	1	+2	4
2. Fulham	2	1	1	0	3	1	+2	4
3. Leyton Orient	2	0	0	2	0	4	−4	0

== Squad statistics ==
Pos.	Name	League		FA Cup		Rumbelows Cup		Total	
Pos.	Name	Apps	Goals	Apps	Goals	Apps	Goals	Apps	Goals

== Transfers ==
=== In ===
Date	Pos.	Name	From	Fee
31 May 1990	MF	(England) Gary Barnett	(England) Huddersfield Town	Free
29 August 1990	MF	(England) Julian Hails	(England) Hemel Hempstead	Free
6 September 1990	MF	(England) Gary Brazil	(England) Newcastle United	£110,000
12 October 1990	DF	(England) Simon Morgan	(England) Leicester City	£100,000
8 November 1990	FW	(Northern Ireland) Phil Gray	(England) Tottenham Hotspur	Loan
8 February 1991	FW	(England) Phil Stant	(England) Notts County	£60,000

=== Out ===
Date	Pos.	Name	To	Fee
20 August 1990	DF	(England) Gary Elkins	(England) Wimbledon	£20,000

== Notes and references ==
General

- Turner, Dennis (2007). Fulham – The Complete Record. Derby: Breedon Books. ISBN 978-1-85983-566-1.
