= Andy Pape =

Andy Pape is the name of:

- Andy Pape (composer)
- Andy Pape (footballer)
