= Hoddy =

Hoddy is an English surname and nickname for the male given name Horace. Notable people with this name include:

- Hoddy Hildreth (1931–2019), American lawyer, politician and conservationist
- Hoddy Mahon (1932–2011), American sportsperson
- Kevin Hoddy (born 1968), English football player
