= Fred Kemp =

English footballer (1946–2026)

Personal information
- Full name: Frederick George Kemp
- Date of birth: 27 February 1946
- Place of birth: Salerno, Italy
- Date of death: 23 July 2026 (aged 80)
- Height: 5 ft 8 in (1.73 m)
- Position: Half-back

Youth career
- 1961–1963: Wolverhampton Wanderers

Senior career*
Years	Team	Apps	(Gls)
1963–1965	Wolverhampton Wanderers	3	(0)
1965–1970	Southampton	61	(10)
1970–1971	Blackpool	21	(1)
1971–1974	Halifax Town	111	(10)
1974–1975	Hereford United	13	(2)
1975–1976	Durban City		
1976	→ Weymouth (loan)		
1976–1977	Telford United		
- * Club domestic league appearances and goals

Frederick George Kemp (27 February 1946 – 23 July 2026) was an English footballer who played as a half-back in the 1960s and 1970s. He started his professional career with Wolverhampton Wanderers, before joining Southampton for five years. Kemp then had three years with Halifax Town, for whom he made over 100 appearances followed by a short spell at Hereford United, before winding up his career in non-league football.

== Career ==
Kemp was born in Salerno, Italy, on 27 February 1946, to an Italian mother and an English army father. He joined Wolverhampton Wanderers as a 15-year-old apprentice in April 1961, signing as a professional in May 1963. He made three Football League appearances for the Wolves before Ted Bates signed him for Southampton in June 1965 for a fee of £5,000.

He made his debut at The Dell playing at inside-left against Preston North End on 27 November 1965, when George O'Brien was ill with hepatitis. He scored the Saints' second goal with a "brave header" in a 5–2 victory, and retained his place in the forward line for the next three matches before losing his place to Norman Dean. Southampton finished the 1965–66 season as runners-up in the Second Division, gaining promotion to the top division.

Kemp spent two years in the reserves as a forward before being converted into a wing-half with goal-scoring ability in March 1968. On 24 August 1968, he returned to the first team, replacing Hugh Fisher at right-half, scoring the opening goal in a 2–1 victory over Wolverhampton Wanderers. He retained his place for the remainder of the season, making 37 appearances and scoring four goals as Southampton finished seventh and qualified for European football for the first time, in the Inter-Cities Fairs Cup. Although Kemp made one appearance in the Fairs Cup, he lost his place to Fisher in November, with his final first-team appearance coming on 31 March 1970.

Known as "Fiery Fred" and described as "a delightfully tippy-toed runner", Kemp's "crowd-pleasing surges down the right wing" were not popular with his teammates, including Joe Kirkup and Ken Jones, who considered that the team needed the more defensively-minded Fisher at right-half to allow Terry Paine the freedom to operate on the right wing. Paine himself considered that Kemp's runs "didn't warrant all that energy" and, while exciting the crowd, they became "infectious" and began to "rub off on the other players" to the detriment of the team. Following the signing of Brian O'Neil in the summer of 1970, Kemp was no longer required and was sold to Blackpool in November for a fee of £35,000.

He stayed for a year at Blackpool before moving on to Halifax Town in December 1971. He stayed at The Shay for 2 1/2 years, during which time he was a virtual ever-present, making 111 league appearances and scoring ten goals.

In the 1974 close season, Kemp was signed by Colin Addison for Hereford United but before the season started Addison was replaced by John Sillett who recruited Terry Paine as his assistant. Kemp considered Paine as his "nemesis" and, after 13 appearances, left the club to rejoin Addison in South Africa at Durban City in March 1975. By the following spring, Kemp was back in England and joined Telford United as team captain for a season before his retirement in the summer of 1977.

== Later life ==
While at Telford, Kemp played charity football in Wolverhampton and worked part-time selling furniture to offices and schools. The business expanded and Kemp's son-in-law, the former Fulham midfielder, John Marshall joined the family business. Kemp lived close to Wolves' training base at Compton.

== Death ==
Kemp died on 23 July 2026, aged 80.

== Bibliography ==
- Chalk, Gary; Holley, Duncan; Bull, David (2013). All the Saints – A Complete Players' Who's Who of Southampton FC. Hagiology Publishing. ISBN 978-0-9926864-0-6.
- Holley, Duncan; Chalk, Gary (1992). The Alphabet of the Saints. ACL & Polar Publishing. ISBN 0-9514862-3-3.
- Holley, Duncan; Chalk, Gary (2003). In That Number – A Post-war Chronicle of Southampton FC. Hagiology Publishing. ISBN 0-9534474-3-X.
- Hugman, Barry (1981). Football League Players Records (1946–1981). Aylesbury: Rothmans Publications. ISBN 0-907574-08-4.
