= Moussa Dagnogo =

French footballer (born 1982)

Personal information
- Date of birth: 30 January 1982 (age 44)
- Place of birth: Paris, France
- Height: 1.82 m (6 ft 0 in)
- Position: Striker

Team information
- Current team: Jacksonville FC (coach for youth boys teams)

Senior career*
Years	Team	Apps	(Gls)
1996–1997	US Sénart-Moissy		
1997–1998	AS Angoulême		
1998–1999	RCF Paris		
1999–2000	União da Madeira	19	(0)
2000	Bristol Rovers	2	(0)
2001	St Mirren	5	(1)
2001	KR Reykjavík	10	(1)
2001–2002	Red Star 93		
2002	Locminé		
2002–2004	Indiana Blast		
2005–2006	Cincinnati Kings	2	(0)
2007–2008	Indianapolis Braves		

Managerial career
- Carmel United SC U-15
- Cardinal Ritter Varsity
- Jacksonville Youth SC U 16 FURY Boys
- Christ's Church Academy Eagles
- U14 JFC Armada Boys
- * Club domestic league appearances and goals

Moussa Dagnogo (born 30 January 1982) is a French former professional footballer who played as a striker. He formerly worked as head coach of Carmel United Soccer Club. He is currently coaching premier and elite players at Jacksonville FC

== Playing career ==
Dagnogo was born in Paris. He signed for Scottish club St Mirren as a trialist in February 2001, and scored the winning goal on his debut against Dundee. He was subsequently signed on a permanent contract. Dagnogo had a trial with Scottish Football League side, Clyde in December 2002.

== Coaching career ==
In 2009, Dagnogo became the coach of Carmel United Soccer Club in Carmel, IN. At Carmel he had great success, leading his teams to strong runs at the state championship. From 2004 - 2011, he coached youth players in Indiana most recently at Carmel United Soccer Club. In 2010, Moussa’s U15 Girls won the State Cup. While at FC Pride, his U12 & U15 Girls were State Cup Semi-finalists. Moussa has also been Assistant Coach for Men’s & Women’s teams at St Joseph University. Moussa holds the National C Coaching License.

In May 2011, Dagnogo relocated to Jacksonville, Florida and began coaching at the long established Jacksonville Youth Soccer Club. He assisted in training various teams and players, and was head coach of the Under 16 Boys FURY team. Under Dagnogo's leadership the team steadily climbed in state rankings and performed well in several tournaments in the Southeastern US.

Dagnogo coached at a local high school in Jacksonville, FL from 2011 to 2013. During his tenure as head coach at Christ's Church Academy, he led his team to the divisional championships 3 straight years, and to the regional championships in his final season.

Dagnogo then left to coach at the Jacksonville Football Club. In the 2015–16 season he was head coach of the Under 14 Boys Armada, leading them to the Quarterfinals in State cup and the Final of Florida Cup.
