= Mile Milovac =

American soccer player

Personal information
- Date of birth: May 5, 1965 (age 61)
- Position: Goalkeeper

Senior career*
Years	Team	Apps	(Gls)
–1996	United Serbs		
1996	Indianapolis Twisters (indoor)	5	(0)
1997–1998	Indiana Blast		
- * Club domestic league appearances and goals

Mile Milovac (born May 5, 1965) was an American soccer goalkeeper who was drafted by D.C. United in the 1996 MLS Inaugural Player Draft. He played for United Serbs in Chicago's Metropolitan Soccer League as well as in the Continental Indoor Soccer League and Premier Development League. Milovac lives in Indianapolis and holds a USSF 'B' License.

Milovac played for the United Serbes in Chicago's Metropolitan Soccer League. In February 1996, D.C. United drafted Milovac in the seventh round (70th overall) of the 1996 MLS Inaugural Player Draft. The team waived him on April 16, 1996. He then played the 1996 summer indoor season with the Indianapolis Twisters in the Continental Indoor Soccer League. On September 30, 1996, the Indiana Blast of the USISL D3-Pro League.

He currently owns a fireplace construction and repair company in Indianapolis, Indiana.
