= Indiana Blast =

American soccer team

- Full name: Indiana Blast
- Nickname: The Blast
- Founded: 1996
- Dissolved: 2004
- Stadium: Kuntz Memorial Stadium
- Capacity: 6,760
- Manager: (England) Peter Baah
- League: USL Premier Development League
- 2004: 9th, Heartland Division
Home colors	Away colors

Indiana Blast was an American soccer team, founded in 1996. The team was a member of the United Soccer Leagues, played in the USISL and A-League (1997–2004) until folding at the end of the 2004 season.

The Blast played their home games at Kuntz Memorial Stadium in Indianapolis, Indiana. The team's colors were white and blue for its last four years after four years with red and black as its colors. Peter Baah and Larry Harmon served as general managers.

== Year-by-year ==
Year	Division	League	Reg. season	Playoffs	Open Cup
1997	3	USISL Pro League	2nd, North Central	Quarter Finals	Did not qualify
1998	3	USISL Pro League	1st, North Central	Division Finals	Did not qualify
1999	2	USL A-League	4th, Central	Did not qualify	Did not qualify
2000	2	USL A-League	3rd, Central	Conference Quarterfinals	Did not qualify
2001	2	USL A-League	6th, Central	Did not qualify	Did not qualify
2002	2	USL A-League	4th, Central	Did not qualify	Did not qualify
2003	2	USL A-League	5th, Central	Did not qualify	Did not qualify
2004	4	USL PDL	9th, Heartland	Did not qualify	Did not qualify

== Honors ==
- USISL Pro League North Central Division Champions 1998

== Competition History ==
Officially announced a press conference on September 30, 1996, the Blast signed its first player that November in goalkeeper standout from Yugoslavia and of MLS Mile Milovac and signed its second star player in Marc LeBere who came over on transfer from the Philadelphia Freedom after scoring 13 goals for Philadelphia, LeBere was a premier striker and expected to lead this new franchise in scoring. LeBere was a two time All-American in high school and a collegiate national champion. The club played its first match at Kuntz Stadium on April 25, 1997, a 2–0 loss to eventual A-League champion Milwaukee Rampage in front of 2,886 fans. The team claimed its first victory on May 9, beating the Cincinnati Riverhawks 4–0.

By August, the team's original owner, businessman Ferid Poturkovic, had sold the club to MorSports, Inc. On the day the sale was announced, the Blast beat the Chicago Stingers 2–0 to clinch a playoff berth with their fifth consecutive victory to end the regular season. Two weeks later, the Blast came from 2–0 down to defeat the Cleveland Caps 3–2 and win a first-round playoff game. The Blast then defeated Chicago 1–0 on August 22 to make it to the Pro League quarterfinals, where they fell 6–0 to the Charlotte Eagles.

The 1998 season was the best in the club's history, as the Blast went 15–3 in league play (17–4 overall) and won the North Central Division's regular-season championship. The Chicago Stingers exacted their revenge for 1997's playoff defeat, though, as they beat the Blast 3–0 on August 21, 1998, in a first-round playoff match. The year would end with the Blast winning "Organization of the Year" honors from the USISL and earning promotion to the A-League.

In its first A-League game, the Blast won away to Tennessee Rhythm 3–1, but finished a mere point out of the playoff race with a 13–15 record, having lost the final postseason spot to the El Paso Patriots by virtue of a tiebreaker.

Though the Blast struggled to a 9–15–4 record in 2000, they qualified for the playoffs and absorbed a 7–0 pounding at the hands of the Minnesota Thunder in the first round. The club never qualified for postseason play again.

Original coach Jimmy McDonald stepped down after the 2000 season and was replaced by Bret Hall, who had coached the Chicago Stingers and Sockers to three consecutive championships. For health reasons, Hall was forced to relinquish his duties before ever coaching a game and he was replaced by assistant Ian Martin, the former head coach at Butler University in Indianapolis. Martin's only season at the helm resulted in an 8–18–0 record in 2001.

Former French professional and Mauritanian international Eric Descombes took over as player-coach for the 2002 season, which saw the team go 6–18–4, including a stretch of 16 games over two months in which it won just one match. A highlight was a 2–2 draw against the Rochester Raging Rhinos in a nationally televised game on August 17 that drew a then-club-record 4,557 fans (a figure that would be topped on July 13, 2003, when 5,140 saw a 3–2 loss to the Pittsburgh Riverhounds).

McDonald returned to the sidelines for the 2003 season, but it was the worst in the club's history, as they continued losing and controversy dogged the Blast from the season's start. McDonald resigned for the final time after a horrendous start and was replaced by assistant Mike Sanich. Before the 3–23–2 season was over, player Peter Baah had taken the reins. It would be the Blast's last season in the A-League.

A move to the Premier Development League for the 2004 season infused the club with young talent, but the results weren't much better as the Blast finished 5–12–1 under coach John Dolinsky (who was first replaced by player Mark Allen and then by Baah before the season's end). The team's final match ever was a 3–2 loss to the Kalamazoo Kingdom at home on July 17, 2004. The final victory in club history came the night before, a 7–3 home decision over the Kansas City Brass.

In its history, the Blast established quite a rivalry with the Cincinnati Riverhawks, as the teams met 25 times. Indiana won 12, Cincinnati 11 and there were 2 draws in the series. At the other end of the spectrum, Indiana went just 2–15–1 in 18 matches against the Minnesota Thunder. In eight seasons, the club won 67, lost 114 and tied 11 in league play.

== Coaches ==
- (Scotland) Jimmy McDonald 1994–2000, 2003
- (United States) Bret Hall 2001
- (United States) Ian Martin 2001
- (Mauritania) Eric Descombes 2002
- (United States) Mike Sanich 2003
- (England) Peter Baah 2003, 2004
- (United States) John Dolinsky 2004
- (United States) Mark Allen 2004

== Notable former players ==
- (United States) Mark Allen
- (England) Peter Baah
- (England) Matt Blackbourne
- (United States) Jamar Beasley
- (United States) Brian Brooks
- (Mauritania) Eric Descombes
- (United States) Jeffrey Dresser
- (United States) John Michael Hayden
- (Ukraine) Aleksey Korol
- (Canada) Marc LeBere
- (United States) Chris Lemons
- (Brazil) Amarildo Oliveira
- (England) Jon Pickup
- (United States) Nick Pasquarello
- (United States) Mark Phillips
- (United States) Matt Reiswerg
- (United States) Casey Sweeney
- (South Africa) Godfrey Tenoff
- (United States) Steve Weiger

== Final Squad ==
vs Kalamazoo Kingdom, 17 July 2004 Note: Flags indicate national team as defined under FIFA eligibility rules; some limited exceptions apply. Players may hold more than one non-FIFA nationality.

No.	Pos.	Nation	Player
1	GK	USA	Evan Reinhardt
3	MF	USA	Andrew Kirk
4	DF	USA	Ashley Hopkins
5	MF	USA	Craig Lippincott
6	MF	USA	Jordan Ciriaco
7	MF	USA	Jon Caldwell
9	FW	USA	Brian Brooks
10	FW	BRA	Rodrigo Costa
11	FW	USA	Jake Vollmer

No.	Pos.	Nation	Player
12	DF	USA	Jeff Samples
13	DF	HAI	Mesac Celeste
16	FW	USA	Derek Ottesen
17	MF	USA	John Michael Hayden
18	MF	USA	Matt Blackbourne
19	FW	FRA	Moussa Dagnogo
20	DF	USA	Parker Koester
23	DF	ENG	Peter Baah

== Stadium ==
- Kuntz Memorial Stadium, Indianapolis, Indiana 1997–2004
