= Larry Harmon (soccer coach) =

American soccer coach (1941–2016)

Larry L. Harmon
- Born: March 24, 1941; Marion, Indiana, U.S.
- Died: September 23, 2016 (aged 75); Indianapolis, Indiana, U.S.
- Occupation: Soccer coach
- Years active: 1985–2016
- Known for: Youth soccer advocate
- Spouse: Mary Linville (1969–2016; his death)

Larry L. Harmon (March 24, 1941 – September 23, 2016) was an American soccer coach and soccer advocate. For over 30 years Harmon advocated for youth soccer in the United States, primarily in his home state of Indiana. He served on the board of directors for the US Soccer Federation and served as president of the Indiana Youth Soccer Association. Harmon was also the general manager for the now defunct Indiana Blast and Indiana Blaze.

== Career in soccer ==
Starting in 1985, Harmon coached recreation soccer, followed by competitive soccer starting in 1988.

=== Indiana ===
Harmon served as co-chair of the 1987 Pan American Games. From 1993 until 2000, Harmon served as president of the Indiana Youth Soccer Association and as chairman of Indiana Soccer from 1995 until 2000. Harmon was general manager of the now-defunct Indiana Blaze and Indiana Blast. He also served as president of the Northeast Youth Soccer Association and chairman of the local Lamar Hunt U.S. Open Cup organizing committee.

Harmon served as president of the Lawrence Soccer Corporation and is credited with helping to facilitate the development of the Lawrence Soccer Park, a 21-field soccer facility in Lawrence, Indiana, which also serves as the headquarters for Indiana Soccer. He also served on the committee that advocates for Major League Soccer to expand to Indiana.

=== Nationally ===
Harmon served as Local Organizing Committee Chair for the 1988 US Youth Soccer Region II Championship and 1996 US Youth Soccer National Championships. From 1996 until 1998, he served on the Women's Development Committee for US Soccer. Starting in 2000, Harmon served on the board of directors at United States Youth Soccer Association, ending his term in 2007, and also on US Soccer's Board of Directors, representing youth soccer, until 2006. He was on the Project 2010 committee.

== Personal life and legacy ==
Harmon was born on March 24, 1941, in Marion, Indiana. His parents were Eve Purvis and Lawrence Harmon. Harmon married Mary Linville in 1969 in Indianapolis, Indiana. The couple have two children, Jonathan and Christopher. He died September 23, 2016, at his home in Indianapolis, Indiana.

=== Awards and recognition ===
During his career, Harmon was named as a Lifetime Member of US Soccer and US Youth Soccer renamed their Under-16 Boys National Championship Cup after Harmon. In 1997, he was awarded the Mike Vogel Humanitarian Award from the North Central Soccer Club and named to the Indiana Soccer Hall of Fame in 2000. He was also a member of the White River Park State Games Hall of Fame. He was a recipient of the Sagamore of the Wabash.
