= Indianapolis Braves =

- Full name: Indianapolis Braves
- Nickname: The Braves
- Founded: 2007
- Ground: Lawrence Soccer Complex
- Chairman: Dan Meador
- Manager: Pete Kapsalis
- League: National Premier Soccer League
- 2007: 4th, did not make playoffs
Home colours	Away colours

Indianapolis Braves were an American soccer team, the men's professional team of the Indianapolis-based soccer organization, FC Pride, which competed in the National Premier Soccer League (NPSL), the third tier of the American Soccer Pyramid, for just one season, in 2007.

They played their home games at the Kuntz Memorial Soccer Stadium in the city of Indianapolis, Indiana, 3 miles (4.8 km) north-west of downtown Indianapolis.

Their playing squad included defender Eric Descombes, a current full international player for Mauritania who played in both of that country's 2006 FIFA World Cup qualifying games against Zimbabwe in 2003, as well as former professionals John Swann, Brian Brooks, and Moussa Dagnogo.

== Year-by-year ==
Year	Division	League	Regular season	Playoffs	Open Cup
2007	4	NPSL	4th, Midwest	Did not qualify	Did not qualify
