= Eric Descombes =

Association football player and manager (born 1971)

Éric Descombes
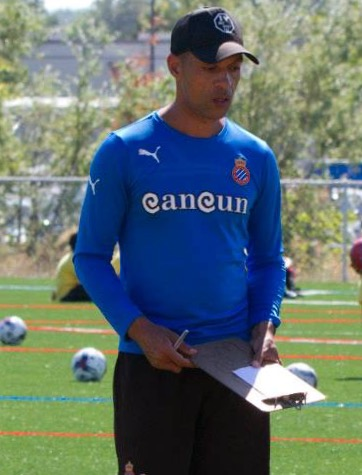

Personal information
- Date of birth: 25/06/1971
- Place of birth: Abidjan, Ivory Coast
- Height: 1.83 m (6 ft 0 in)
- Position: Defender

Team information
- Current team: SC Bastia (Technical/Academy director)

Senior career*
Years	Team	Apps	(Gls)
1986–1987	Canon Yaoundé		
1988	Diamant Yaoundé		
1988–1989	Lyon B		
1989–1994	Toulouse B		
1995	Chico Rooks	26	(5)
1996	Cascade Surge	25	(3)
1997	Sacramento Scorpions	30	(7)
1997–1998	Southend United	0	(0)
1999	New Orleans Storm	27	(1)
2000–2001	Cincinnati Riverhawks	49	(0)
2002–2003	Indiana Blast	12	(0)
Total		169	(16)

International career
2003	Mauritania	2	(0)

Managerial career
- 2000–2001: Indiana Blast
- 2007: Indianapolis Braves
- 2013: Africa Sports d'Abidjan
- 2013: Central African Republic
- 2017–2022: FC Mulhouse (Director of Football, Manager)
- 2023: SC Bastia (Technical Director/Academy Director)
- * Club domestic league appearances and goals

Eric Descombes (born 25 June 1971) is an association football manager and former player.

== Life and career ==
Born in Ivory Coast, he was naturalized by Mauritania and participated with the Mauritanian national team in the World Cup qualifiers for Germany 2006. He spent his career between Europe and the United States, playing with clubs such as Chico Rooks, Cascade Surge, Sacramento Scorpions, Southend United, New Orleans Storm, Cincinnati Riverhawks and Indiana Blast. He capped twice for the Mauritanian national team and played in 169 games at the professional level, scoring 16 times.

Descombes started his professional coaching career in the A-League with the Cincinnati Riverhawks as a player-assistant coach and with the Indiana Blast as a head coach. He was the head coach and GM with Africa Sports d'Abidjan in Ivory Coast (2012/2013 season). He was named as the new national team coach and technical director of the Central African Republic, shortly after. The team participated in the CEMAC Cup in December 2013, while the civil war just had started. He led the team to a final appearance, after defeating Chad (1–0), Congo (1–0), and Cameroon (1–0), but falling to host country Gabon (0–2) in the final.

In January 2017, Descombes was named as the Director of Football with FC Mulhouse in France, overseeing the club's entire sport side, from the youth academy to the first team. In July 2018 he was named as the club's new manager. In his first season at the helm, he won the league championship and promotion to the next division, and a coach of the year accolade.

Eric Descombes was appointed in May 2023 by SC Bastia of France's Ligue 2 as the new technical/academy director in charge of revamping the youth academy and restructuring its organization.

.
