= Ben Barnett (footballer) =

English footballer (born 1969)

Personal information
- Full name: Benjamin James Barnett
- Date of birth: 18 December 1969 (age 56)
- Place of birth: Islington, England
- Position: Forward

Senior career*
Years	Team	Apps	(Gls)
1993–1994	Barnet	2	(0)
1995–1996	Leyton		
1996–1997	Dagenham & Redbridge		
- Heybridge Swifts
- Boreham Wood
- * Club domestic league appearances and goals

Benjamin James Barnett (born 18 December 1969) is an English former professional footballer who played in the Football League as a forward.
