= Chris Lemons =

American soccer player (born 1979)

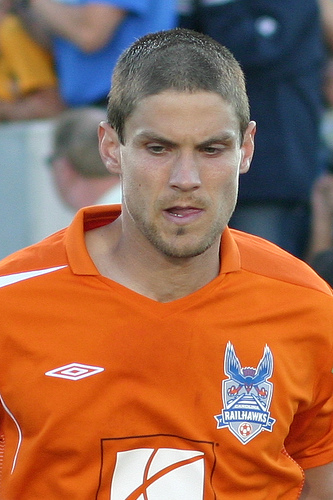
- Lemons in 2008

Personal information
- Full name: Christopher Lemons
- Date of birth: November 21, 1979 (age 46)
- Place of birth: Wichita, Kansas, United States
- Height: 5 ft 11 in (1.80 m)
- Position: Midfielder

College career
Years	Team	Apps	(Gls)
1998–2001	Oklahoma Christian Eagles		

Senior career*
Years	Team	Apps	(Gls)
2002	Cwmbran Town		
2003	Virginia Beach Mariners	9	(0)
2003	→ Indiana Blast (loan)	6	(0)
2004–2006	Charlotte Eagles	52	(5)
2007	Cleveland City Stars	19	(2)
2007	→ Colorado Rapids (loan)	0	(0)
2008	Carolina RailHawks	21	(0)
2009–2010	Charlotte Eagles	36	(4)
2011–2013	Wichita Wings (indoor)	58	(9)
2013–2014	Wichita B52s (indoor)	8	(1)
2016	FC Wichita	8	(1)
- * Club domestic league appearances and goals as of August 15, 2010

Chris Lemons (born November 21, 1979) is an American soccer player who plays for FC Wichita.

== Career ==
=== Youth and college ===
Lemons was born in Wichita, Kansas. He was a two time All State high school soccer player before attending Oklahoma Christian University where he was a 2000 NAIA honorable mention All American and a 2001 third team All American.

=== Professional ===
In 2002, Lemons moved to Wales where he played with Cwmbran Town A.F.C. In 2003, he signed with the Virginia Beach Mariners of the USL First Division, playing part of the season on loan to the Indiana Blast. In 2004, he moved to the Charlotte Eagles of the USL Second Division. In 2007, he moved to the Cleveland City Stars of USL-2. In August and September 2007, he went on loan to the Colorado Rapids of Major League Soccer. He never gained a first team roster spot, but played a handful of games with the Rapids Reserves.

On April 16, 2008, Lemons signed with the Carolina RailHawks of the USL First Division. He played twenty-one games with the RailHawks, but did not return for the 2009 season. Instead, he signed with the Charlotte Eagles on March 31, 2009.

Lemons left Charlotte after the 2010 season. He was signed by the Wichita Wings of MISL in 2011
