= Russell Edwards (footballer) =

English association football player

Personal information
- Full name: Russell James Edwards
- Date of birth: 21 December 1973 (age 52)
- Place of birth: Beckenham, England
- Position: Centre-back

Youth career
- Crystal Palace

Senior career*
Years	Team	Apps	(Gls)
1992–1994	Crystal Palace	0	(0)
1994	Barnet	5	(1)
1994–1999	Dulwich Hamlet		
1999–2003	Welling United		
2003–2006	Chelmsford City		
2006–2007	Braintree Town		
2007	Canvey Island		
2007–2008	Braintree Town		
- * Club domestic league appearances and goals

Russell James Edwards (born 21 December 1973) is an English former footballer who played as a defender.

== Career ==
Edwards began his career at Crystal Palace, after playing in the club's academy. Edwards failed to make a first team appearance at Crystal Palace, and signed for Barnet in 1994. Edwards made five Football League appearances for Barnet, before moving onto Dulwich Hamlet. Following a spell at Dulwich Hamlet, Edwards moved to Welling United and Chelmsford City, before signing for Braintree Town. In November 2007, Edwards had a brief spell at Canvey Island, before moving back to Braintree, where he retired in 2008.
