= Paul Cobb =

English footballer

Personal information
- Full name: Paul Mark Cobb
- Date of birth: 13 December 1972 (age 53)
- Place of birth: Aveley, England
- Position: Forward

Senior career*
Years	Team	Apps	(Gls)
1989–1990	Purfleet		
1990–1993	Leyton Orient	5	(0)
1993–1995	Purfleet		
1995–1996	Enfield		
1996–1997	Purfleet		
1997–2001	Dagenham & Redbridge		
2001–2002	Canvey Island		
2002	Heybridge Swifts		
2002–2003	Braintree Town		
- East Thurrock United
- Tilbury
- * Club domestic league appearances and goals

Paul Mark Cobb (born 13 December 1972) is an English former professional footballer who played as a forward in the Football League for Leyton Orient and for a number of teams in non-League football, most notably Dagenham & Redbridge.

At age seventeen, Cobb joined the Thurrock football club for the 1993-1994 football season.
