= Willie Orr (footballer, born 1875) =

Scottish footballer

Personal information
- Full name: William Orr
- Date of birth: 9 December 1875
- Place of birth: Ayr, Scotland
- Date of death: 21 December 1912 (aged 37)
- Position: Full back

Senior career*
Years	Team	Apps	(Gls)
1896–1897	Ayr Parkhouse		
1898–1901	Glossop	39	(0)
1901–1903	Manchester City	36	(0)
1903–1904	Fulham	26	(0)
1904–1906	Glossop	61	(0)
1906–1907	Watford		
1907–1908	Glossop	0	(0)
Total		162	(0)
- * Club domestic league appearances and goals

William Orr (9 December 1875 – 21 December 1912) was a Scottish footballer who played in the Football League for Glossop and Manchester City.
