= Zeke Rowe =

English footballer

Personal information
- Full name: Ezekiel Bartholomew Rowe
- Date of birth: 30 October 1973 (age 53)
- Place of birth: Stoke Newington, London, England
- Position: Forward

Youth career
- Chelsea

Senior career*
Years	Team	Apps	(Gls)
1992–1996	Chelsea	0	(0)
1993–1994	→ Barnet (loan)	10	(2)
1994–1995	→ Bangor F.C. (loan)	4	(3)
1995	→ Sandefjord BK (loan)	?	(?)
1996	→ Brighton & Hove Albion (loan)	9	(3)
1996–1999	Peterborough United	30	(3)
1997	→ Kettering Town (loan)	?	(?)
1998	→ Doncaster Rovers (loan)	6	(2)
1999	→ Welling United (loan)	?	(?)
1999–2001	Welling United	?	(?)
2001–2002	King's Lynn	25	(3)
2002	Hinckley United	5	(0)
Total		85	(13)
- * Club domestic league appearances and goals

Ezekiel Bartholomew Rowe (born 30 October 1973 in Stoke Newington, London, England), is an English footballer who played as a forward in the Football League.
