= Chris Moore (footballer, born 1980) =

English football player (born 1980)

Personal information
- Full name: Christopher Charles Moore
- Date of birth: 13 January 1980 (age 46)
- Place of birth: Hammersmith, London, England
- Height: 5 ft 9 in (1.75 m)
- Position: Striker

Team information
- Current team: Hanwell Town (manager)

Youth career
- Brentford

Senior career*
Years	Team	Apps	(Gls)
1999–2002	Uxbridge	90	(25)
2002–2003	Northwood	70	(37)
2003–2006	Dagenham & Redbridge	98	(44)
2006–2007	Brentford	16	(2)
2007–2008	Dagenham & Redbridge	41	(5)
2008–2009	Chelmsford City	27	(4)
2009–2010	Farnborough	1	(0)
2010–2012	Uxbridge	62	(34)
2012–2014	Wealdstone	39	(13)
2014–2016	Uxbridge	49	(12)
2016–2018	Egham Town	45	(10)
2018–2020	Hanwell Town	12	(0)

International career
	Wales C	7	(4)

Managerial career
- 2017–2018: Egham Town
- 2018–: Hanwell Town
- * Club domestic league appearances and goals

Christopher Moore (born 13 January 1980) is a former footballer who manages Southern Football League side Hanwell Town. He played as a striker.

== Playing career ==
Moore was born in Hammersmith. He began his career at Brentford as a trainee before moving on to Uxbridge, Northwood and Dagenham & Redbridge.

Moore starred in the four nations tournament for Wales C in 2006 finishing the tournaments top scorer with goals against England and Scotland and a brace against Republic of Ireland, Wales won the four nations tournament held in Sussex, England.

Moore was signed by Brentford manager Leroy Rosenior on a free transfer on 5 July 2006. His wages were paid by the £50,000 Coca-Cola 'Win a Player' fund which Brentford won thanks to a competition entry by a Brentford fan.

Moore scored the only goal of the game on his Football League One debut in Brentford's 1–0 win at Northampton Town's Sixfields stadium.

Moore failed to break into the Brentford first team due to a change in management and gradually fell out of favour. His contract was mutually terminated on 29 January 2007 and he rejoined his former club Dagenham & Redbridge the next day.

In July 2008, he signed for Chelmsford City.

In October 2009, he joined Farnborough, but was released after one substitute appearance after failing to agree terms to stay, later rejoining Uxbridge in 2010.

Moore played a key role and scored some important goals as Tony Choules' side qualified for the play-offs at the end of the 2011–12 season. Moore then started the 2012–13 in impressive form and netted the equalising goal against Wembley which was broadcast live on ESPN as part of the Lions' Budweiser sponsorship deal. However, in December 2012 he signed for Isthmian League side Wealdstone.

However, Moore rejoined Uxbridge for a third time in January 2014.

In February 2016, Moore signed for Southern League Division One Central high-flyers Egham Town.

== Managerial and coaching career ==
In June 2017, Moore took up his first job in management at Egham Town, arriving as the replacement for Gary Meakin who moved to Beaconsfield Town. Moore and his assistant Wayne Carter were dismissed in January 2018.

He has since been appointed with Carter as joint managers of Hanwell Town. In the 2021–22 Isthmian League season, Moore and Carter led Hanwell to promotion to Step 3 for the first time in the club's history, beating Chertsey Town 3-2 (AET) to win the Isthmian South Central play-off final. After the season, Carter stepped away to take the manager's job at Chertsey Town, leaving Moore in sole charge.

== Personal life ==
Moore is a Queens Park Rangers supporter.

== Honours ==
Dagenham & Redbridge

- Conference National: 2006–07

Wales C

- Four Nations Tournament: 2006
