= Tommy Wolfe =

Welsh footballer

Personal information
- Full name: Thomas Henry Wolfe
- Date of birth: 7 March 1900
- Place of birth: Barry, Wales
- Date of death: 23 March 1954 (aged 54)
- Place of death: Edgware, England
- Height: 5 ft 11 in (1.80 m)
- Positions: Inside left; wing half

Senior career*
Years	Team	Apps	(Gls)
- Atlantic Mills
- Barry
1921–1922	Swansea Town	0	(0)
1922	The Wednesday	0	(0)
1923	Coventry City	10	(1)
1924–1925	Southend United	11	(0)
1925–1926	Fulham	27	(2)
1927–1928	Charlton Athletic	10	(0)
1929–1930	Bristol Rovers	2	(0)
1930	Westerham		
1930	Tunbridge Wells Rangers		

International career
1922	Wales Amateurs	1	(0)
- * Club domestic league appearances and goals

Thomas Henry Wolfe (7 March 1900 – 23 March 1954) was a Welsh amateur footballer who played as a inside left in the Football League for Fulham, Southend United, Coventry City, Charlton Athletic and Bristol Rovers. He was capped by Wales at amateur level.

== Career statistics ==
Appearances and goals by club, season and competition
Club	Season	League			National Cup		Total	
Club	Season	Division	Apps	Goals	Apps	Goals	Apps	Goals
Coventry City	1923–24	Second Division	10	1	0	0	10	1
Southend United	1924–25	Third Division South	11	0	0	0	11	0
Bristol Rovers	1928–29	Third Division South	2	0	0	0	2	0
Career total			23	1	0	0	23	1
