= Harvey Darvill =

English footballer

Personal information
- Full name: Harvey Arthur Darvill
- Date of birth: 7 April 1896
- Place of birth: Watford, England
- Date of death: 1924 (aged 27–28)
- Position: Inside forward

Senior career*
Years	Team	Apps	(Gls)
1919–1920	Ilford		
1920–1924	Fulham	69	(10)
Total		69	(10)
- * Club domestic league appearances and goals

Harvey Arthur Darvill (7 April 1896 – 1924) was an English footballer who played in the Football League for Fulham.

A few weeks before his death Darvill had been involved when the Fulham coach on the way to a London Challenge Cup tie at Tottenham was involved in an accident with a lorry in which several players were injured. Two weeks after the accident he collided with Leicester goalkeeper, George Hebden, got up and continued playing after complaining of stomach pains. He played two more games, including scoring an equaliser against Stoke, before being rushed into hospital. An operation found a ruptured blood vessel in his stomach, and he died. He was just 28 and had been married for six months.
