= Andy Pape (footballer) =

English footballer

Personal information
- Full name: Andrew Maurice Pape
- Date of birth: 22 March 1962 (age 64)
- Place of birth: Hammersmith, England
- Position: Goalkeeper

Youth career
- Feltham

Senior career*
Years	Team	Apps	(Gls)
1979–1980	Queens Park Rangers	1	(0)
1980–1981	Charlton Athletic	0	(0)
1981	Ikast FS	14	(0)
1981–1982	Crystal Palace	0	(0)
1982	Ikast FS	27	(0)
1982–1983	Feltham		
1983–1985	Harrow Borough		
1985–1991	Enfield		
1991–1994	Barnet	40	(0)
1992	→ Woking (loan)		
1993	→ Dagenham & Redbridge (loan)		
1994–1998	Enfield		
1998–1999	Sutton United		
1999–2002	Aldershot Town		
2002	Harrow Borough		
2002–2003	Sutton United		

International career
1986–1990	England Semi-Pro	12	(0)
- * Club domestic league appearances and goals

Andrew Maurice Pape (born 22 March 1962) is an English former professional footballer who played as a goalkeeper.

== Career ==
Born in Hammersmith, Pape played club football in England and Denmark for Feltham, Queens Park Rangers, Charlton Athletic, Ikast FS, Crystal Palace, Harrow Borough, Enfield, Barnet, Woking, Dagenham & Redbridge, Sutton United and Aldershot Town.

At representative level, he won twelve caps for the England semi-professional team.
