= Jack Papworth =

English footballer

Personal information
- Full name: John Martin Papworth
- Date of birth: 8 November 1894
- Place of birth: Deptford, England
- Date of death: 13 November 1942 (aged 48)
- Place of death: Deptford, England
- Height: 5 ft 7 in (1.70 m)
- Positions: Centre forward; centre half

Senior career*
Years	Team	Apps	(Gls)
- St Nicholas
1914–1925	Fulham	39	(16)
1925–1926	Watford	27	(12)
- Dartford
- * Club domestic league appearances and goals

John Martin Papworth MSM (8 November 1894 – 13 November 1942) was an English professional footballer who played as a forward in the Football League for Fulham and Watford.

== Personal life ==
During the First World War, Papworth served as a private in the London Regiment and latterly as a company sergeant major in the Machine Gun Corps. He was awarded the Meritorious Service Medal. At the time of his death, Papworth was the landlord of The Mechanics Arms pub in Deptford.

== Career statistics ==
Appearances and goals by club, season and competition
Club	Season	League			FA Cup		Total	
Club	Season	Division	Apps	Goals	Apps	Goals	Apps	Goals
Watford	1924–25	Third Division South	14	5	0	0	14	5
Watford	1925–26	Third Division South	13	7	0	0	13	7
Career total			27	12	0	0	27	12
