= Kenny Achampong =

English footballer (born 1966)

Personal information
- Full name: Kenneth Achampong
- Date of birth: 26 June 1966 (age 60)
- Place of birth: Kilburn, England
- Height: 1.75 m (5 ft 9 in)
- Position: Winger

Youth career
- Fulham

Senior career*
Years	Team	Apps	(Gls)
1984–1989	Fulham	81	(15)
1989–1990	Charlton Athletic	10	(0)
1990–1993	Leyton Orient	83	(7)
Total		174	(22)
- * Club domestic league appearances and goals

Kenneth Achampong is an English former professional footballer who played as a winger. Achampong played for three teams in the Football League between 1984 and 1993, scoring 22 goals in 174 games.

== Personal life ==
Achampong was born in Kilburn, London, on 26 June 1966, of Ghanaian descent, and attended Tulse Hill School.

== Club career ==
Achampong began his career with Fulham in 1983, scoring on his League debut in February 1985 when he was 18. Between 1984 and 1989, Achampong scored 15 goals in 81 League games for Fulham. He joined Charlton Athletic in September 1989, playing in 10 League games, and then transferred to Leyton Orient for £25,000 in July 1990, where he scored seven goals in 83 League games. He was released in May 1993 after falling out with the Orient manager, Peter Eustace.

== International career ==
Achampong earned a call up to the Ghana national team in January 1993 but withdrew following knee surgery and was not called up again.

== Later life ==
After being released from his contract with Leyton Orient in the summer of 1993, Achampong moved to Ghana. After a brief spell living in France, which included a spell training with Olympique de Marseille, Achampong moved to Germany in 1998 and later returned to London.
