= Nicky Evans (footballer) =

English footballer

Personal information
- Full name: Nicholas John Evans
- Date of birth: 6 July 1958 (age 68)
- Place of birth: Bedford, England
- Position: Forward

Senior career*
Years	Team	Apps	(Gls)
1976–1977	Queens Park Rangers	0	(0)
1977–1978	Peterborough United	0	(0)
1978–1983	Kettering Town	?	(?)
1983–1989	Barnet	248	(133)
1989–1991	Wycombe Wanderers	29	(14)
1991–1994	Barnet	54	(18)
- * Club domestic league appearances and goals

Nicholas John Evans (born 6 July 1958) is an English former professional footballer who played in the Football League as a forward.
