= Carl Hoddle =

English footballer and coach

Personal information
- Date of birth: 8 March 1967
- Place of birth: Harlow, England
- Date of death: 2 March 2008 (aged 40)
- Place of death: Sawbridgeworth, England
- Position: Midfielder

Senior career*
| Years | Team | Apps | (Gls) |
| 1984–1986 | Tottenham Hotspur | 0 | (0) |
| 1986–1988 | Barnet | | |
| 1988–1989 | Bishop's Stortford | | |
| 1989–1991 | Leyton Orient | 29 | (2) |
| 1991–1995 | Barnet | 92 | (3) |
| 1995–1996 | Woking | | |
| 1995–1996 | Enfield | | |
| 1996–1997 | Aylesbury | | |
- * Club domestic league appearances and goals

Carl Hoddle (8 March 1967 – 2 March 2008) was an English football player and coach.

The younger brother of England international Glenn Hoddle, Carl began his career with Tottenham Hotspur in 1984. After two years he moved to Barnet, where he stayed until 1988 before moving to Bishop's Stortford in a swap deal for former Barnet player Ian Fergusson. After one season he was signed by Leyton Orient, where he played 29 times, before returning to Barnet in 1991, ending his senior career in 1995 after 100 appearances. He also had a spell with Conference National side Woking.

One notable game he played for Barnet was in the FA Cup against Chelsea in 1994, who were at the time managed by his older brother. He later worked in the used car trade and as a pub landlord before joining his older brother as a coach and scout at Wolverhampton Wanderers between 2004 and 2006. He died on 2 March 2008 after he was found collapsed in his home from what was initially suspected to be a heart attack but later confirmed as a brain aneurysm.
