= Kelly Haag =

English footballer

Personal information
- Full name: Kelly Jason Haag
- Date of birth: 6 October 1970 (age 56)
- Place of birth: Enfield, England
- Position: Forward

Youth career
- –1989: Brentford

Senior career*
Years	Team	Apps	(Gls)
1989–1990	Brentford	5	(0)
1990–1993	Fulham	35	(9)
1993–1994	Barnet	38	(8)
1994–1995	Sutton United		
1995	Woking		
1995	Dagenham & Redbridge	25	(9)
1995	Stevenage Borough	1	(0)
1995	St Albans City	1	(0)
1995–1996	Baldock Town	8	(2)
1996	Aylesbury United	10	(0)
1996	Dover Athletic	2	(1)
1996–2000	Fisher Athletic		
2001–2002	Ware	32	(18)
- * Club domestic league appearances and goals

Kelly Haag (born 6 October 1970) is an English former professional footballer who played as a forward in the Football League for Barnet, Fulham and Brentford.

== Personal life ==
Haag's son Harley also became a footballer.

== Career statistics ==
Appearances and goals by club, season and competition
Club	Season	League			FA Cup		League Cup		Other		Total	
Club	Season	Division	Apps	Goals	Apps	Goals	Apps	Goals	Apps	Goals	Apps	Goals
Brentford	1989–90	Third Division	5	0	1	0	1	0	0	0	7	0
Fulham	1990–91	Third Division	12	3	1	0	0	0	0	0	13	3
Fulham	1991–92	Third Division	18	6	1	0	1	0	0	0	20	6
Fulham	1992–93	Second Division	5	0	0	0	0	0	0	0	5	0
Fulham	Total		35	9	2	0	1	0	0	0	38	9
Barnet	1993–94	Second Division	38	8	4	1	4	1	1 (Note: Appearance in Football League Trophy)	1	47	11
Stevenage Borough	1995–96	Conference	1	0	—		—		1 (Note: 1 appearance in Herts Senior Cup)	0	2	0
St Albans City	1995–96	Isthmian League Premier Division	1	0	—		—		2 (Note: 2 appearances in Isthmian League Full Members Cup)	0	3	0
Aylesbury United	1995–96	Isthmian League Premier Division	10	0	0	0	—		2 (Note: 2 appearances in Isthmian League Cup)	0	12	0
Career total			90	17	7	1	6	1	6	1	109	20
