= Rob Haworth =

English footballer (born 1975)

Personal information
- Date of birth: 21 November 1975 (age 50)
- Place of birth: Edgware, England
- Position: Forward

Team information
- Current team: St Albans City

Youth career
- Fulham

Senior career*
| Years | Team | Apps | (Gls) |
| 1993–1995 | Fulham | 21 | (1) |
| 1995–1996 | Kettering Town | 6 | (2) |
| 1996 | Aylesbury United | | |
| 1996 | TPS Turku | 4 | (1) |
| 1996–2000 | St Albans City | | |
| 2000–???? | Dagenham and Redbridge | | |
| ????–2002 | Sutton United | | |
| 2002–2003 | Hendon | 28 | (4) |
| 2003–2004 | Gravesend & Northfleet | 22 | (6) |
| 2004 | Maidenhead United | | |
| 2004–???? | Metropolitan Police | | |
| 2007 | Carshalton Athletic | | |
| 2007–2008 | Margate | | |
| 2008–2010 | Dartford | | |
| 2010–2011 | Tooting & Mitcham United F.C. | | |
| 2011 | Metropolitan Police | | |
| 2011–2013 | St Albans City | | |
- * Club domestic league appearances and goals

Rob Haworth (born 21 November 1975) is an English retired footballer who last played for St Albans City. He started his career playing in the Football League, before playing for a significant number of non-league clubs in London and the South East.

== Fulham and Finland ==
He started his career in the Football League with Fulham, and he made 29 senior appearances for them, with his last League appearance for Fulham being in Football League Division 3 on 8 January 1995, when he came on as a substitute against Chesterfield. He then moved to Kettering Town, and he made a total of 13 appearances for them in the 1995–96 season, having made his debut in December 1995. As of April 1996 he was playing for Aylesbury United in the Isthmian League.

In the summer of 1996 he played four league matches for TPS in the Finnish Veikkausliiga, scoring one goal, on 6 June 1996 against Mikkelin Palloilijat.

== St Albans and other non-league ==
He played for St Albans City F.C. between 1996 and 2000, where he scored 51 goals in 182 matches. His next club was Dagenham and Redbridge (for whom he played in the FA Cup against Charlton Athletic). In 2002, he moved from Sutton United F.C. to Hendon F.C., and he then moved in September 2003 to play for Ebbsfleet in the Football Conference, and he made 22 league appearances for the Kent club, scoring 6 times. As of April 2004 he was playing for Maidenhead United, although he left them in the summer of 2004 to join Metropolitan Police F.C.

He joined Dartford in summer 2008 from Margate, although Wealdstone had originally reported he had signed for them. Haworth was released by Dartford in May 2010 and the following month he joined Tooting and Mitcham United F.C. He rejoined his former club Metropolitan Police F.C. in March 2011, and then in June he returned to another of his former clubs, St Albans City F.C.
