= Kevin Hoddy =

English footballer

Personal information
- Date of birth: 6 January 1968 (age 58)
- Place of birth: Romford, England
- Height: 5 ft 10 in (1.78 m)
- Position: Midfielder

Youth career
- 1984–1986: Fulham

Senior career*
Years	Team	Apps	(Gls)
1986–1989	Fulham	22	(1)
1989	Charlton Athletic	0	(0)
1989–1992	Roeselare		
- Welling United
- Chelmsford City
- Cheshunt
- Barking
2000–2002	Ford United		
2002–2003	Aveley		
- * Club domestic league appearances and goals

Kevin Hoddy (born 6 January 1968) is an English former professional footballer who played as a midfielder.

== Career ==
Beginning as an apprentice at Fulham, Hoddy made 22 appearances in the Football League for them between 1986 and 1989. After leaving Fulham, Hoddy played briefly for Charlton Athletic, without making a first-team appearance, and in Belgium for Roeselare, before returning to non-League football in England with a number of teams including Welling United, Chelmsford City, Cheshunt, Barking, Ford United and Aveley.
