= Peter Baah =

English footballer and manager

Personal information
- Date of birth: 1 May 1973 (age 53)
- Place of birth: Littleborough, England
- Position: Winger

Youth career
- 1989–1991: Blackburn Rovers

Senior career*
Years	Team	Apps	(Gls)
1991–1992	Blackburn Rovers	1	(0)
1992–1994	Fulham	49	(4)
–	Northwich Victoria	?	(?)
1998–2004	Indiana Blast	?	(?)
2005	Cincinnati Kings	6	(0)
Total		56	(4)

Managerial career
- 2003–2004: Indiana Blast
- 2006: Minnesota Thunder (Assistant)
- * Club domestic league appearances and goals

Peter Baah (born 1 May 1973) is an English former professional footballer. During his playing career, Baah played as a winger in England and the United States, before becoming a football coach.

== Early and personal life ==
Baah was born on 1 May 1973 in Littleborough.

== Career ==
After graduating from the youth team, Baah made one appearance in the Football League for hometown club Blackburn Rovers during the 1991–92 season. Baah then played for Fulham between 1992 and 1994, scoring 4 goals in 49 league appearances, before moving to non-League football with Northwich Victoria.

Baah later played in the US for the Indiana Blast between 1998 and 2004; he was also Head Coach from 2003 to 2004. He also played for the Cincinnati Kings in 2005.

Baah became Assistant Coach of the Minnesota Thunder in 2006, and also coached Park Tudor High School.
