= John Marshall (footballer, born 1964) =

English footballer

Personal information
- Date of birth: 18 August 1964 (age 62)
- Place of birth: Balham, England
- Height: 5 ft 10 in (1.78 m)
- Position: Midfielder

Senior career*
Years	Team	Apps	(Gls)
1982–1997	Fulham	411	(29)
- * Club domestic league appearances and goals

John Marshall (born 18 August 1964) is an English former professional footballer who played over 400 games in the Football League for Fulham.

Marshall signed for Fulham as a schoolboy and played in 411 matches scoring 29 goals in the Football League from 1982 to 1997. After retiring from playing, he went on to become a scout and coach.

As well as working as a coach, Marshall worked with his father-in-law, the former Southampton and Halifax Town player Fred Kemp, in the family business, supplying furniture to offices and schools.
