= Udo Onwere =

English footballer

Personal information
- Full name: Udo Alozie Onwere
- Date of birth: 9 November 1971 (age 54)
- Place of birth: Hammersmith, England
- Height: 1.83 m (6 ft 0 in)
- Position: Midfielder

Youth career
- Fulham

Senior career*
Years	Team	Apps	(Gls)
1990–1994	Fulham	85	(7)
1994–1996	Lincoln City	43	(4)
1996	Dover Athletic		
1996–1997	Blackpool	9	(0)
1997–1999	Barnet	36	(2)
1999	Aylesbury United	3	(0)
1999–2000	Hayes	3	(0)
2000	Maidenhead United		
Total		179+	(13+)
- * Club domestic league appearances and goals

Udo Alozie Onwere (born 9 November 1971) is an English lawyer and former professional footballer who played as a midfielder. Active between 1990 and 2000, Onwere made nearly 200 appearances in the Football League.

== Career ==
Born in Hammersmith, Onwere played for Fulham, Lincoln City, Dover Athletic, Blackpool, Barnet, Aylesbury United, Hayes and Maidenhead United.

For Lincoln City he made 50 appearances in all competitions, scoring 5 goals.

For Barnet he made 43 appearances in all competitions, scoring 3 goals.

For Aylesbury United he made 3 appearances in the Isthmian League Premier Division, without scoring.

After retiring as a player in 2000, Onwere qualified as a lawyer. As of November 2024, he was a Partner at City firm Bray & Krais, working in sports law.
