= Ara Bedrossian =

Cypriot footballer (born 1967)

Personal information
- Date of birth: 2 June 1967 (age 59)
- Height: 5 ft 9 in (1.75 m)
- Position: Midfielder

Youth career
- AYA

Senior career*
Years	Team	Apps	(Gls)
- Kingstonian
- APOEL
1992–1993	Queens Park Rangers	0	(0)
1993–1995	Fulham	42	(1)
- Stevenage Borough
- APOEL
- Olympiakos Nicosia
- * Club domestic league appearances and goals

Ara Bedrossian (born 2 June 1967) is a Cypriot former professional footballer who played as a midfielder.

== Early and personal life ==
He is of Armenian descent. His father was a Cypriot tennis champion. He moved to England in 1974 following the Turkish invasion of Cyprus.

== Career ==
=== Early career ===
In England, Bedrossian played youth football with AYA before playing semi-professionally with Kingstonian. He spent his early career in Cyprus with APOEL, playing for them for 8 years.

=== Playing in England ===
He moved from Queens Park Rangers to Fulham at the end of the 1992–93 season. While playing with Fulham he has trials at Birmingham City and Middlesbrough. Bedrossian made a total of 42 league appearances for Fulham, scoring 1 goal. He also played for Stevenage Borough.

=== Later career ===
Bedrossian later played in Sweden before returning to Cyprus, playing for APOEL and Olympiakos Nicosia, where he retired from playing at the age of 35.

He later ran the Arsenal Soccer School in Cyprus as well as being Arsenal's scout for Eastern Europe. He also managed AGBU Ararat, a futsal team.
