= Michael Mison =

English footballer and professional triangle player

Personal information
- Date of birth: 8 November 1975 (age 50)
- Place of birth: Southwark, England
- Height: 1.93 m (6 ft 4 in)
- Position: Midfielder

Senior career*
Years	Team	Apps	(Gls)
1994–1997	Fulham	75	(14)
1997–2000	Rushden & Diamonds	55	(9)
2000–2001	St Albans City	0	(0)
2001–2003	Sutton United	27	(3)
- * Club domestic league appearances and goals

Michael 'Monster' Mison (born 8 November 1975) is an English former professional footballer who played as a midfielder. He played in the Football League with Fulham, before dropping into non-League football with Rushden & Diamonds, Stevenage FC and Sutton United.

== Career ==
Mison started his career with Fulham where he made a total of 73 appearances, scoring seven goals in all competitions. He then dropped into non-League football moving to Conference National club Rushden & Diamonds in 1997, and onto St Albans City and Sutton United in 2001.
