= Glen Thomas =

English footballer

Personal information
- Full name: Glen Andrew Thomas
- Date of birth: 6 October 1967
- Place of birth: Hackney, London, England
- Height: 6 ft 0 in (1.83 m)
- Position: Defender

Team information
- Current team: Redbridge (assistant manager)

Youth career
- 1984–1985: Fulham

Senior career*
Years	Team	Apps	(Gls)
1985–1994	Fulham	251	(6)
1994–1995	Peterborough United	8	(0)
1995–1996	Barnet	16	(0)
1996–1998	Gillingham	28	(0)
1998–1999	Brighton & Hove Albion	3	(0)
1999	Barking		
1999	Aveley		
1999	Bishop's Stortford		
1999–?	Ford United		
- * Club domestic league appearances and goals

Glen Andrew Thomas (born 6 October 1967) is an English former professional association footballer. During a fourteen-year professional career he played for Fulham, Peterborough United, Barnet, Gillingham and Brighton & Hove Albion, and made over 300 appearances in the Football League.

== Career ==
Born in the Hackney district of London, Thomas began his career as an apprentice professional with Fulham in October 1984. He turned professional with the club a year later, and spent nine years playing for the Craven Cottage-based team, playing a total of 295 matches, mainly as a central defender. During his time with the club, Fulham suffered relegation on two occasions, and dropped to the bottom division of the Football League. In November 1994 he moved to Peterborough United on a free transfer, but played only 11 matches before joining Barnet in March 1995.

In January 1996 Thomas moved again, this time to Gillingham. The Kent-based club was challenging for promotion from the Football League Third Division and manager Tony Pulis was looking to strengthen his team. Thomas remained with the "Gills" until the end of the 1997–98 season, but played only 30 matches, his opportunities being restricted by a succession of injuries. One such injury occurred in November 1996 as the team were training for an upcoming Football League Cup match against Ipswich Town of the First Division. Thomas jumped for the ball but lost his balance and stumbled into a nearby tree. A branch hit him in the face and he was taken to hospital where he required surgery to save his sight. Pulis commented that the player had come within an inch of losing his eye.

Thomas was released from his contract with Gillingham in July 1998 and joined Brighton & Hove Albion. He remained with the club until March 1999, but was restricted to just five appearances. His final match at a professional level was in October 1998, in a 3–1 defeat to Mansfield Town. He subsequently dropped into non-League football with Barking, and went on to play for several other clubs in the Isthmian League. He later moved into coaching and in 2008 was appointed as assistant manager of Redbridge. He had captained the club in 2001 under its former name of Ford United.
