= Dagenham & Redbridge F.C. =

Association football club in London, England

Dagenham & Redbridge
- Full name: Dagenham & Redbridge Football Club
- Nickname: The Daggers
- Founded: 1992; 34 years ago
- Ground: Victoria Road
- Capacity: 6,078
- Chairman: Anwar Uddin
- Manager: Lee Allinson
- League: National League South
- 2025–26: National League South, 13th of 24
- Website: daggers.co.uk
Home colours	Away colours	Third colours

Dagenham & Redbridge Football Club (/ˈdæɡ(ə)nəm ... ˈrɛdbrɪdʒ/), often known simply as Dagenham and abbreviated when written to Dag & Red, is a professional association football club based in Dagenham, Greater London, England that play in the National League South, the sixth level of the English football league system. They are nicknamed the Daggers and play their home games at Victoria Road which holds a capacity of 6,078.

The club was formed in 1992 through a merger of Dagenham and Redbridge Forest, the latter merged from Ilford, Leytonstone and Walthamstow Avenue. The club's traditional colours are red and blue, to represent the merged teams. The club replaced Redbridge Forest in the Football Conference but were relegated in 1996. They won the Isthmian League title in 1999–2000 and qualified for the next three Conference play-offs, missing out on the 2001–02 title on goal difference and losing the 2003 Conference play-off final. They secured promotion into the Football League after winning the conference title in the 2006–07 season. They then moved up from League Two after winning the 2010 play-off final, though were relegated the next season after finishing 21st in League One. Dagenham were relegated back into non-League football in 2016. They suffered a further relegation to the National League South in 2024–25.

== History ==
=== Formation ===
Dagenham & Redbridge F.C. was formed in 1992 following a merger between two clubs – Dagenham F.C. and Redbridge Forest F.C.. Both clubs had fallen on hard times due to dwindling attendances. The club can trace back its ancestry to 1881 as Redbridge Forest was an amalgamation of three of the amateur game's most famous clubs, Ilford, Leytonstone and Walthamstow Avenue. Between the clubs they won the FA Trophy once, FA Amateur Cup seven times, Isthmian League 20 times, Athenian League six times, Essex Senior Cup 26 times and London Senior Cup 23 times.

Chart of yearly table positions of Dagenham & Redbridge in the Football League since the merger.

=== Non-League ===
Dagenham & Redbridge spent its inaugural season in the Football Conference, taking the place of Redbridge Forest. The club's first fixture after the merger was on 25 July 1992, which was an 8–0 thrashing of Great Wakering Rovers in a friendly. The first competitive result was a 2–0 win over Merthyr Tydfil in the conference.

Dagenham & Redbridge spent several seasons in the Football Conference but were relegated to the Isthmian League Premier Division in 1996, at that point the 6th tier of English football. They remained in that division until winning promotion in the 1999–2000 season, subsequently cementing themselves as one of the strongest clubs in the conference, finishing third, second and fifth in its first three seasons back following promotion.

The club was narrowly beaten to the conference title by Boston United in 2002 on goal difference. Boston United were subsequently found guilty of making illegal payments during the 01/02 season. Dagenham & Redbridge attempted to have itself declared Conference Champions, and therefore take Boston's contentious place in The Football League, however their appeal was unsuccessful and they remained in the Football Conference for the 2002/03 season. A four-point deduction was put in place against Boston United for the following season but not for the season in which the irregularities had been committed.

The Daggers then declined somewhat, finishing the 2003–04, 2004–05 and 2005–06 seasons in mid-table. On 27 February 2004 they were hammered 9–0 at home by Hereford United, equalling the record highest winning margin in the conference.

The 2006–07 season saw Dagenham & Redbridge battle it out with Oxford United for the top of the league spot. Despite Oxford quickly racing to the top, a collapse in Oxford's form combined with an excellent run for the Daggers saw them overtake Oxford in the league. On 7 April, Dagenham & Redbridge beat Aldershot Town 2–1 to mathematically secure the conference title, meaning the club would play in the Football League for the first time in its short history.

=== 2007–2015: Football League ===
Dagenham & Redbridge played their first match in the Football League on 11 August 2007, a 1–0 defeat to Stockport County. The club won its first Football League game at home to Lincoln City on 1 September 2007. The Daggers finished the season in 20th place, ensuring a second season of Football League competition. The following season, the Daggers reached their highest position in the English footballing pyramid yet, an 8th place finish in League Two, where they narrowly missed out on the League Two play-offs after losing to Shrewsbury Town at home on the final day of the season.

The 2009–10 season saw the Daggers promoted from League Two to League One via the play-offs. They defeated Rotherham United in a dramatic play-off final at Wembley which ended 3-2 to Dagenham. The Daggers took the lead twice, only to concede moments later on both occasions. Jon Nurse regained the advantage for Dagenham & Redbridge, scoring a 70th-minute winner. The Daggers’ first game in League One was a 2–0 defeat to Sheffield Wednesday, which set the scene for the rest of the season, and they finished 21st and were relegated on the last day of the 2010–11 season back to League Two.

Their first season back in League Two resulted in a 19th place finish. Manager John Still left the club during the 2012–13 season to join Luton Town after nine years at the helm. The Daggers would end up finishing 22nd that season, narrowly avoiding relegation back into non-league football by a single spot. Following the club's safety from relegation, Wayne Burnett was appointed as manager on a permanent basis after a spell as caretaker manager. Despite an inconsistent start to the 2013–14 season, Dagenham & Redbridge finished in ninth place.

However, the club faced a match fixing scandal during the season. Following newspaper reports, an investigation launched by the National Crime Agency jailed two players and businessman, Krishna Ganeshan, Chann Sankaran and Michael Boateng, a Whitehawk player, for match-fixing. Moses Swaibu was similarly charged in January 2014. They were convicted of conspiracy to commit bribery for a failed plot to fix a game between AFC Wimbledon and Dagenham & Redbridge on 26 November. It is believed that the case may have been part of a wider Singaporean match-fixing syndicate which Europol and other investigations uncovered.

In 2014–15 League Cup, Dagenham & Redbridge played out a 6–6 match with Brentford before losing the subsequent penalty shootout. The EFL commemorated the historic match by removing the nets from Victoria Road for that game, putting them on display at the National Football Museum in Manchester.

In the 2015–16 season, the Daggers started the season poorly. Burnett was dismissed in December 2015, to be replaced by John Still. They drew Premier League club Everton in the third round of the FA Cup, but ended up losing losing 2–0. Still was unable to save Dagenham & Redbridge from relegation in his third spell. After a 3–2 defeat away to Leyton Orient, relegation from League Two was confirmed, and Dagenham's nine-year spell in the Football League was brought to an end.

=== 2016–2025: return to non-League ===
In their first season back in the National League, they ended the season in fourth place; they lost their play-off semi-final to Forest Green Rovers. The 2017–18 season started positively, but after the club was hit by a financial crisis midway through the season, the Daggers finished the campaign in 11th place. The financial crisis was resolved early in the 2018–19 season.

Peter B. Freund of Trinity Sports Holdings purchased controlling interest in the club in 2018. He sold the club in 2024 to Club Underdog, a subsidiary of North Sixth group, who reached an agreement in principle to purchase the club. They became the fifth club owned by the group, joining Italian clubs Campobasso and Ascoli, Swiss club FC Locarno and the newly formed American club Brooklyn FC.

Manager since March 2023, Ben Strevens was sacked in December 2024, after a run of just seven wins from 23 league fixtures left the Daggers five points above the relegation zone. They were ultimately relegated to the National League South on the final day of the 2024–25 season.

On 3 March 2026, British influencer Olajide Olatunji, more commonly known as KSI, purchased a minority stake in the club. He reportedly wants to take the team to the Football League, and eventually to the heights of the Premier League. On 6 March, Variety announced that KSI alongside After Party Studios will be producing a docuseries titled "Race to the Top", chronicling his takeover of the club similarly to Ryan Reynolds' "Welcome to Wrexham."

== Club sponsorship ==
Kit suppliers
Dates	Supplier
1996–97	En-S
1997–2013	Vandanel
2013–2019	Sondico
2019–2023	Nike
2023–2025	Admiral
2025–present	Umbro

Shirt sponsors
Dates	Sponsor
1992–96	Dagenham Post
1996–97	Recorder Newspapers
1997–2006	Compass
2006–	West & Coe

== Current squad ==
=== First-team squad ===
As of 09 October 2026

Note: Flags indicate national team as defined under FIFA eligibility rules; some limited exceptions apply. Players may hold more than one non-FIFA nationality.

No.	Pos.	Nation	Player
1	GK	ENG	Nathan Ashmore
2	DF	ENG	Samuel Adenola
3	DF	ENG	Liam Vincent
4	MF	ENG	George Marsh
5	DF	ENG	Sam Graham
7	FW	SUI	Davide Rodari
8	MF	ENG	Harry Beautyman
9	FW	ENG	Andy Carroll
10	MF	BER	Kane Crichlow
11	FW	ENG	Noah Coppin
12	DF	ENG	Henry Hawkins
14	MF	ENG	Antony Papadopoulos

No.	Pos.	Nation	Player
15	DF	ENG	Jack Bateson
16	FW	POL	Wiktor Makowski
18	MF	ENG	Archie Tamplin
19	MF	ENG	Charles Clayden
20	GK	NGR	Phil Ogayi (dual-registered with Welling United)
21	MF	ENG	Freddie Ingram (on loan from Colchester United)
22	DF	GRN	Kayden Harrack
24	DF	ENG	Josh Addae
25	GK	ENG	Thiago Speroni (on loan from Crystal Palace)
27	MF	ENG	Remiero Moulton (on loan from Watford)
34	FW	ENG	Remaye Campbell
38	MF	FRA	Timothée Dieng (captain)

=== Out on loan ===
Note: Flags indicate national team as defined under FIFA eligibility rules; some limited exceptions apply. Players may hold more than one non-FIFA nationality.

No.	Pos.	Nation	Player
6	DF	ENG	Jet Dyer (on loan at Braintree Town until 12 December 2026)
17	FW	ENG	Kymani Thomas (on loan at Aveley until 05 November 2026)
29	FW	ENG	Stan Leech (on loan at Maidstone United until 18 December 2026)

=== Team management ===
Updated 14 August 2026

Position	Name
Manager	Lee Allinson
Player-Assistant Manager	Andy Carroll
Senior Technical Adviser	Ian Allinson
Technical Adviser	Gary King
First-team Coach	Cliff Akurang
Goalkeeping Coach	Alexandros Balaskas
Strength and Conditioning Coach	Lucas Perry
First Team Analyst	Scott Munro
Chief Scout	Rich Bates
Club doctor	Dr. Alex Gibbs
Head of Youth Development	Stuart Fergus

Club Officials

Position	Name
Chairman	Anwar Uddin MBE
Chief Executive Officer	John Grabowski
Patron	The Worshipful The Mayor of the London Borough of Barking and Dagenham
Honorary Life President	Steve Thompson MBE
Vice-Presidents	Ray Calcutt FRSA, C.Eng., M.I. Mech.E, Paul Gwinn JP, Dave Bennett

Board of directors

Directors: Peter Freund, John Grabowski, Alan Jeyes (Members Director)

Club Administration

Position	Name
Club Secretary	Charlie Fraser
Media Officer	Tom Rist
Commercial Manager	Caroline Logush
Safety Officer	Craig Witham
Ticketing & Club Shop Manager	Charlie Fraser
Bar & Conference Manager	Chris Pollard
Community Trust Manager	Denis Lawrence
Groundsman	Mitchell Diggines
Designated Safeguarding Officer	Denis Lawrence
Turnstiles Manager	Jamie Joyes

== Managers ==
Dagenham & Redbridge have had twelve different managers since their formation in 1992.

From	To	Manager
May 1992	May 1994	(England) John Still
May 1994	September 1995	(England) Dave Cusack
September 1995	April 1996	(England) Graham Carr
April 1996	March 1999	(England) Ted Hardy
May 1999	April 2004	(England) Garry Hill
April 2004	26 February 2013	(England) John Still
2 May 2013	21 December 2015	(England) Wayne Burnett
31 December 2015	18 May 2018	(England) John Still
5 June 2018	29 December 2019	(England) Peter Taylor
3 January 2020	24 February 2023	(Republic of Ireland) Daryl McMahon
10 March 2023	26 December 2024	(England) Ben Strevens
16 January 2025	8 May 2025	(England) Lewis Young
5 June 2025	18 March 2026	(England) Lee Bradbury
18 March 2026	25 April 2026	(England) Andy Carroll (Interim player-manager)
3 May 2026	Present	(England) Lee Allinson

== Stadium ==
Dagenham and Redbridge play out of the Chigwell Construction Stadium. Also known as Victoria Road, it has been used for football since 1917. However, it was not fully enclosed until 1955. The pitch was massively upgraded during that summer, including being re-seeded.

In 1956, the main stand (boasting a capacity of 800) was built by JW Bowers. Before this, there was only a small wooden stand. Further improvements were made that summer by adding turnstiles and some toilets.

1958 saw the addition of the cover over the far side of the pitch. Very little happened until 1990, when Redbridge Forest F.C. paid for a new stand to be built. Just two years later, Redbridge and Dagenham merged, and they fixed the perimeter wall and the toilets.

In 2001, a new stand (800 seat capacity) was built. Further upgrades occurred that year, as new turnstiles and floodlights were built. The year of upgrades continued when Bass Brewers PLC pledged £150,000 to build a new stand. It is currently known as the Carling Stand.

Only a couple upgrades have occurred since 2001. The SD Samuels Stand was erected in 2009, seating 1200 fans and housing the dressing rooms. Finally, new floodlights were added in 2012.

The ground has held multiple major matches, including a Women's FA Cup semi-final, multiple UEFA Youth International fixtures, and numerouse West Ham United U23 Premier League 2 games.

== Records and statistics ==
=== League history ===
Season	Division	Position	Top league goalscorer(s)	Notes
1992–93	Conference (V)	3rd	Paul Cavell (19)	–
1993–94	Conference (V)	6th	David Crown (9)	–
1994–95	Conference (V)	15th	Ian Richardson (10)	–
1995–96	Conference (V)	22nd	Kelly Haag (8)	Relegated
1996–97	Isthmian premier (VI)	4th	Vinnie John (12)	–
1997–98	Isthmian premier (VI)	4th	Paul Cobb (24)	–
1998–99	Isthmian premier (VI)	3rd	Paul Cobb (21)	–
1999–2000	Isthmian premier (VI)	1st	Paul Cobb (18)	Promoted
2000–01	Conference (V)	3rd	Danny Shipp / Junior McDougald (9)	–
2001–02	Conference (V)	2nd	Mark Stein (24)	Runners-up on goal difference
2002–03	Conference (V)	5th	Mark Stein / Steve West (16)	Play-off finalists
2003–04	Conference National (V)	13th	Chris Moore (10)	–
2004–05	Conference National (V)	11th	Chris Moore (19)	–
2005–06	Conference National (V)	10th	Chris Moore (15)	–
2006–07	Conference National (V)	1st	Paul Benson (28)	Promoted
2007–08	League Two (IV)	20th	Ben Strevens (15)	–
2008–09	League Two (IV)	8th	Paul Benson (18)	–
2009–10	League Two (IV)	7th	David Robson (22)	Play-off winners; promoted
2010–11	League One (III)	21st	Romain Vincelot (12)	Relegated
2011–12	League Two (IV)	19th	Brian Woodall (13)	–
2012–13	League Two (IV)	22nd	Luke Howell (9)	–
2013–14	League Two (IV)	9th	Rhys Murphy (13)	–
2014–15	League Two (IV)	14th	Jamie Cureton (19)	–
2015–16	League Two (IV)	23rd	Christian Doidge (8)	Relegated
2016–17	National League (V)	4th	Oliver Hawkins (18)	–
2017–18	National League (V)	11th	Michael Cheek (13)	–
2018–19	National League (V)	18th	Conor Wilkinson (12)	–
2019–20	National League (V)	17th	Ángelo Balanta (7)	Season abandoned, final table decided by points-per-game
2020–21	National League (V)	12th	Paul McCallum (15)	–
2021–22	National League (V)	8th	Paul McCallum (18)	–
2022–23	National League (V)	10th	Josh Walker / Junior Morias (10)	–
2023–24	National League (V)	15th	Inih Effiong (16)	–
2024–25	National League (V)	21st	Josh Rees (16)	Relegated
2025–26	National League South	13th	Joe Haigh (8)	

=== Club records ===
- Record victory:
  - Football League – 6–0 vs. Chester City, 9 August 2008; 6–0 vs. Morecambe, 16 May 2010
  - Football Conference – 8–1 vs. Woking, 19 April 1994
- Record defeat:
  - Football League – 5–0 vs. Peterborough United, 7 May 2011; 5–0 vs Cheltenham Town, 18 February 2012
  - Football Conference – 9–0 vs. Hereford United, 27 February 2004
- Record attendance: 5,949 vs. Ipswich Town, FA Cup third round, 5 January 2001
- Record league attendance: 4,791 vs. Shrewsbury Town, League Two, 2 May 2009
- Record transfer fee paid: Oliver Hawkins from Hemel Hempstead, undisclosed fee
- Record transfer fee received: Dwight Gayle to Peterborough United, £470,000 (2013)
- Record appearance holder: Tony Roberts, 507 appearances over 10 years
- Record goalscorer: Danny Shipp, 105 goals over nine years
- Best FA Cup performance: Fourth round, 2002–03; lost to Norwich City 1–0
- Best EFL Cup performance: First round (9), 2007–08, 2008–09, 2009–10, 2010–11, 2011–12, 2012–13, 2013–14, 2014–15, 2015–16
- Best EFL Trophy performance: Quarter-finals, 2001–02, 2008–09, 2013–14, 2015–16
- Best FA Trophy performance: Runners-up, 1996–97; lost to Woking 1–0
- Best National League Cup performance: Group stage, 2024–25

=== Other records ===
- Tony Roberts was the second goalkeeper in the history of the FA Cup to have scored a goal from open play. He netted against Basingstoke Town in October 2001, it was a fourth qualifying round.
- First fully capped international whilst playing for Dagenham & Redbridge was Jon Nurse who was capped for Barbados against Dominica in 2008.
- The highest ever scoreline in the first leg of a play-off game is now held by Dagenham & Redbridge, they defeated Morecambe 6–0 on 16 May 2010, although they could not build on this afterwards with a 2–1 defeat in the second leg.
- The joint highest aggregate score in a League Cup match: 12 – On 12 August 2014, Dagenham & Redbridge drew 6–6 after extra time at home with Brentford in the first round of the League Cup. They went on to lose 4–2 on penalties.

== Honours ==
League

- League Two (level 4)
  - Play-off winners: 2010
- Conference (level 5)
  - Champions: 2006–07
- Isthmian League (level 6)
  - Champions: 1999–2000

Cup

- FA Trophy
  - Runners-up: 1996–97
- Essex Senior Cup
  - Winners: 1997–98, 2000–01
  - Runners-up: 2001–02

== See also ==
- Football in London
