= 1989–90 Brentford F.C. season =

English football team season

Brentford
1989–90 season
- Chairman: Martin Lange
- Player-manager: Steve Perryman
- Stadium: Griffin Park
- Third Division: 13th
- FA Cup: First round
- League Cup: Second round
- Football League Trophy: Quarter-final
- Top goalscorer: League: Holdsworth (24); All: Holdsworth (28)
- Highest home attendance: 7,962
- Lowest home attendance: 2,544
- Average home league attendance: 5,662
Home colours	Away colours

During the 1989–90 English football season, Brentford competed in the Football League Third Division. After showing relegation form during the first three months of the season, a revival between November 1989 and February 1990 ensured a mid-table finish.

== Season summary ==
After a long season in which the sheer amount of cup fixtures ultimately affected Brentford's hopes of a finish in the Third Division play-offs, manager Steve Perryman saw fit to make only minor changes to his squad. Released were bit-part players and late-season signings Andy Feeley, Graham Pearce, Jon Purdie, Jeremy Roberts and Tony Sealy and in came just two players – club record £167,000 midfielder Eddie May from Hibernian (as a direct replacement for March 1989 departee Andy Sinton) and left back Mark Fleming on a free transfer from Queens Park Rangers.

Aside from progressing to the second round of the League Cup, Brentford had a torrid start to the Third Division season and dropped into the relegation places on 9 September 1989. Manager Perryman entered the transfer market to bring Watford forward Dean Holdsworth back to Griffin Park, after a one-month loan spell during the previous season. The £125,000 paid for Holdsworth made him the club's most expensive forward at the time. The signing of Holdsworth had little immediate impact and the Bees' slump continued from September into mid-November, when the club occupied bottom place in the division for three weeks in a row. A 2–0 win over Northampton Town at the County Ground on 25 November provided the spark that changed the team's fortunes, with Holdsworth coming into form and inspiring a run of 10 wins and 1 draw from a 13-match spell, which lifted Brentford from 24th to 9th place. The Bees stumbled through to the end of the season and the products of Colin Lee's youth team were given game time. Brentford ended the campaign in 13th place.

== League table ==
Pos	Team	Pld	W	D	L	GF	GA	GD	Pts
11	Shrewsbury Town	46	16	15	15	59	54	+5	63
12	Crewe Alexandra	46	15	17	14	56	53	+3	62
13	Brentford	46	18	7	21	66	66	0	61
14	Leyton Orient	46	16	10	20	52	56	−4	58
15	Mansfield Town	46	16	7	23	50	65	−15	55

== Results ==
Brentford's goal tally listed first.

=== Legend ===
Win	Draw	Loss

=== Pre-season and friendlies ===
Date	Opponent	Venue	Result	Attendance	Scorer(s)
19 July 1989	Ashford Town (Middlesex)	A	3–0	n/a	Haag, Gayle, Cronk
22 July 1989	Farnborough Town	A	2–3	n/a	Blissett, Cockram
24 July 1989	Crewe United	A	1–0	n/a	Gayle
29 July 1989	St Albans City	A	6–0	n/a	Haag (2), Godfrey (2), May, Buttigieg
1 August 1989	Fully	A	3–1	n/a	Jones (2, 1 pen), Smillie
7 August 1989	Yeading	H	2–2	n/a	Jenkins, Funnell
9 August 1989	Queens Park Rangers	H	1–0	4,667	Gayle
12 August 1989	Wimbledon	H	0–1	2,200	
14 August 1989	Dartford	A	1–2	n/a	Moabi
18 October 1989	Hayes	A	0–3	n/a	
11 May 1990	Sheffield United	H	4–2	1,531	Driscoll, Holdsworth, Godfrey, Booker (pen)

=== Football League Third Division ===
No.	Date	Opponent	Venue	Result	Attendance	Scorer(s)
1	19 August 1989	Bristol Rovers	A	0–1	5,851	
2	26 August 1989	Chester City	H	1–1	5,153	Evans
3	2 September 1989	Cardiff City	A	2–2	3,499	May (2)
4	9 September 1989	Bury	H	0–1	5,010	
5	16 September 1989	Huddersfield Town	A	0–1	5,578	
6	23 September 1989	Birmingham City	H	0–1	5,386	
7	26 September 1989	Crewe Alexandra	A	3–2	3,496	Smillie, Jones, Godfrey
8	30 September 1989	Wigan Athletic	H	3–1	4,647	Blissett, Holdsworth, May
9	7 October 1989	Bristol City	H	0–2	7,421	
10	14 October 1989	Preston North End	A	2–4	5,956	May, Holdsworth
11	17 October 1989	Bolton Wanderers	H	1–2	4,537	Holdsworth
12	21 October 1989	Shrewsbury Town	A	0–1	3,073	
13	28 October 1989	Fulham	H	2–0	7,962	Evans, Smillie
14	31 October 1989	Notts County	A	1–3	4,586	Moncur
15	4 November 1989	Tranmere Rovers	H	2–4	5,720	May, Ratcliffe
16	11 November 1989	Blackpool	A	0–4	2,512	
17	25 November 1989	Northampton Town	A	2–0	3,165	May, Holdsworth
18	3 December 1989	Leyton Orient	H	4–3	6,434	Smillie, May, Holdsworth (pen), Blissett
19	17 December 1989	Mansfield Town	H	2–1	5,022	Holdsworth (2)
20	26 December 1989	Reading	A	0–1	5,590	
21	30 December 1989	Swansea City	A	1–2	4,537	Blissett
22	1 January 1990	Walsall	H	4–0	5,259	Blissett, Smillie, Holdsworth, Jones
23	6 January 1990	Rotherham United	H	4–2	5,624	Holdsworth (3), Stanislaus
24	12 January 1990	Chester City	A	1–1	2,302	Cockram
25	20 January 1990	Bristol Rovers	H	2–1	7,414	Ratcliffe, Cadette
26	27 January 1990	Bury	A	2–0	2,963	May, Holdsworth
27	10 February 1990	Huddersfield Town	H	2–1	6,774	Holdsworth (2)
28	18 February 1990	Leyton Orient	A	1–0	6,572	Holdsworth
29	21 February 1990	Cardiff City	H	0–1	5,174	
30	25 February 1990	Northampton Town	H	3–2	6,391	Blissett (2), Holdsworth
31	3 March 1990	Rotherham United	A	1–2	5,603	Blissett
32	6 March 1990	Wigan Athletic	A	1–2	1,938	Blissett
33	10 March 1990	Crewe Alexandra	H	0–2	5,815	
34	13 March 1990	Birmingham City	A	1–0	8,169	Holdsworth
35	17 March 1990	Bristol City	A	0–2	10,813	
36	20 March 1990	Preston North End	H	2–2	4,673	Holdsworth, Blissett
37	24 March 1990	Bolton Wanderers	A	1–0	6,156	Holdsworth
38	31 March 1990	Shrewsbury Town	H	1–1	5,387	Smillie
39	7 April 1990	Notts County	H	0–1	5,105	
40	10 April 1990	Fulham	A	0–1	6,729	
41	14 April 1990	Walsall	A	1–2	2,903	Sparham
42	16 April 1990	Reading	H	1–1	5,594	Driscoll
43	21 April 1990	Mansfield Town	A	3–2	2,347	Holdsworth (2, 1 pen), Blissett
44	28 April 1990	Blackpool	H	5–0	4,784	Evans, Cockram, Holdsworth, Driscoll, Blissett
45	2 May 1990	Swansea City	H	2–1	4,950	Holdsworth (2)
46	5 May 1990	Tranmere Rovers	A	2–2	5,379	Godfrey, Evans

=== FA Cup ===
Round	Date	Opponent	Venue	Result	Attendance
1R	18 November 1989	Colchester United	H	0–1	4,171

=== Football League Cup ===
Round	Date	Opponent	Venue	Result	Attendance	Scorer(s)
R1 (1st leg)	23 August 1989	Brighton & Hove Albion	A	3–0	6,405	Millen, Godfrey, May
R1 (2nd leg)	29 August 1989	Brighton & Hove Albion	H	1–1 (won 4–1 on aggregate)	4,306	Blissett
R2 (2nd leg)	19 September 1989	Manchester City	H	2–1	6,065	Evans, Blissett
R2 (1st leg)	4 October 1989	Manchester City	A	1–4 (lost 5–3 on aggregate)	17,864	May

=== Football League Trophy ===
Round	Date	Opponent	Venue	Result	Attendance	Scorer
SPR (match 1)	7 November 1989	Leyton Orient	H	3–0	2,544	Holdsworth (2), May
SPR (match 2)	9 December 1989	Mansfield Town	A	1–2	1,445	Holdsworth
SR1	23 January 1990	Reading	H	2–1	3,928	May, Cadette
SQF	6 February 1990	Bristol Rovers	H	2–2 (a.e.t.), lost 4–3 on pens)	4,409	Smillie, Holdsworth

- Sources: The Big Brentford Book of the Eighties, Statto

== Playing squad ==
Players' ages are as of the opening day of the 1989–90 season.

Pos.	Name	Nat.	Date of birth (age)	Signed from	Signed in	Notes
Goalkeepers
GK	Ashley Bayes	(England)	19 April 1972 (aged 17)	Youth	1990	
GK	Tony Parks	(England)	26 January 1963 (aged 26)	Tottenham Hotspur	1988	
Defenders
DF	Jamie Bates	(England)	24 February 1968 (aged 21)	Youth	1986	
DF	John Buttigieg	(Malta)	5 October 1963 (aged 25)	Sliema Wanderers	1988	
DF	Jason Cousins	(England)	4 October 1970 (aged 18)	Youth	1989	
DF	Terry Evans	(England)	12 April 1965 (aged 24)	Hillingdon	1985	
DF	Mark Fleming	(England)	11 August 1969 (aged 20)	Queens Park Rangers	1989	
DF	Keith Millen	(England)	26 September 1966 (aged 22)	Youth	1985	
DF	Steve Perryman	(England)	21 December 1951 (aged 37)	Oxford United	1986	Manager
DF	Robbie Peters	(England)	18 May 1971 (aged 18)	Youth	1989	
DF	Sean Sparham	(England)	4 December 1968 (aged 20)	Millwall	1990	On loan from Millwall
DF	Roger Stanislaus	(England)	2 November 1968 (aged 20)	Arsenal	1987	
Midfielders
MF	Paul Buckle	(England)	16 December 1970 (aged 18)	Youth	1989	
MF	Allan Cockram	(England)	8 October 1963 (aged 25)	St Albans City	1988	
MF	Andy Driscoll	(England)	21 October 1971 (aged 17)	Youth	1989	
MF	Marcus Gayle	(Jamaica)	27 September 1970 (aged 18)	Youth	1988	Loaned to KuPS
MF	Kevin Godfrey	(England)	24 February 1960 (aged 29)	Leyton Orient	1988	
MF	Keith Jones (c)	(England)	14 October 1965 (aged 23)	Chelsea	1987	
MF	Eddie May	(Scotland)	30 August 1967 (aged 21)	Hibernian	1989	
MF	Simon Ratcliffe	(England)	8 February 1967 (aged 22)	Norwich City	1989	
MF	Neil Smillie	(England)	19 July 1958 (aged 31)	Reading	1988	
Forwards
FW	Gary Blissett	(England)	29 May 1964 (aged 25)	Crewe Alexandra	1987	
FW	Richard Cadette	(England)	21 March 1965 (aged 24)	Sheffield United	1988	Loaned to Bournemouth
FW	Kelly Haag	(England)	6 October 1970 (aged 18)	Youth	1989	
FW	Dean Holdsworth	(England)	8 November 1968 (aged 20)	Watford	1989	
Players who left the club mid-season
GK	Keith Branagan	(Republic of Ireland)	10 July 1966 (aged 23)	Millwall	1989	Returned to Millwall after loan
GK	Colin Scott	(Scotland)	19 May 1970 (aged 19)	Rangers	1990	Returned to Rangers after loan
DF	Paul Miller	(England)	11 October 1959 (aged 29)	Bournemouth	1989	Returned to Bournemouth after loan
MF	John Moncur	(England)	22 September 1966 (aged 22)	Tottenham Hotspur	1989	Returned to Tottenham Hotspur after loan
FW	Andy Ansah	(England)	19 March 1969 (aged 20)	Dorking	1989	Transferred to Southend United

- Sources: The Big Brentford Book of the Eighties, Timeless Bees

== Coaching staff ==
Name	Role
(England) Steve Perryman	Manager
(England) Phil Holder	Assistant Manager
(England) Roy Clare	Physiotherapist

== Statistics ==
=== Appearances and goals ===
Substitute appearances in brackets.

Pos	Nat	Name	League		FA Cup		League Cup		FL Trophy		Total	
Pos	Nat	Name	Apps	Goals	Apps	Goals	Apps	Goals	Apps	Goals	Apps	Goals
GK	(England)	Ashley Bayes	1	0	0	0	0	0	0	0	1	0
GK	(England)	Tony Parks	37	0	1	0	4	0	3	0	45	0
DF	(England)	Jamie Bates	10 (5)	0	0	0	1 (2)	0	3	0	14 (7)	0
DF	(Malta)	John Buttigieg	12 (10)	0	0	0	3 (1)	0	0 (2)	0	15 (13)	0
DF	(England)	Jason Cousins	12 (1)	0	0	0	0	0	1 (1)	0	13 (2)	0
DF	(England)	Terry Evans	44	4	1	0	4	1	3	0	52	5
DF	(England)	Mark Fleming	15 (2)	0	0	0	0	0	1	0	16 (2)	0
DF	(England)	Keith Millen	32	0	1	0	4	1	0	0	37	1
DF	(England)	Steve Perryman	3	0	1	0	0	0	1	0	5	0
DF	(England)	Robbie Peters	1 (1)	0	1	0	0	0	0	0	2 (1)	0
DF	(England)	Roger Stanislaus	31	1	0	0	4	0	3	0	38	1
MF	(England)	Paul Buckle	6 (4)	0	0	0	0	0	0	0	6 (4)	0
MF	(England)	Allan Cockram	21 (5)	2	0	0	0 (2)	0	3	0	24 (7)	2
MF	(England)	Andy Driscoll	10 (2)	2	0	0	0	0	0	0	10 (2)	2
MF	(Jamaica)	Marcus Gayle	1 (8)	0	0	0	0	0	0	0	1 (8)	0
MF	(England)	Kevin Godfrey	16 (11)	2	0 (1)	0	2	1	0 (3)	0	18 (15)	3
MF	(England)	Keith Jones	42	2	1	0	4	0	3	0	50	2
MF	(Scotland)	Eddie May	30	8	1	0	4	2	4	2	39	12
MF	(England)	Simon Ratcliffe	35	2	1	0	4	0	4	0	44	2
MF	(England)	Neil Smillie	43	5	1	0	4	0	4	1	52	6
FW	(England)	Andy Ansah	0 (1)	0	0	0	0 (1)	0	0	0	0 (2)	0
FW	(England)	Gary Blissett	36 (1)	11	1	0	4	2	1 (1)	0	45 (2)	13
FW	(England)	Richard Cadette	7 (9)	1	0	0	1 (1)	0	3	1	11 (10)	2
FW	(England)	Kelly Haag	1 (4)	0	0 (1)	0	0 (1)	0	0	0	1 (6)	0
FW	(England)	Dean Holdsworth	39	24	1	0	1	0	4	4	45	28
Players loaned in during the season
GK	(Republic of Ireland)	Keith Branagan	2	0	—		—		1	0	3	0
GK	(Scotland)	Colin Scott	6	0	—		—		—		6	0
DF	(England)	Paul Miller	3	0	—		—		1	0	4	0
DF	(England)	Sean Sparham	5	1	—		—		—		5	1
MF	(England)	John Moncur	5	1	—		—		1	0	6	1

- Players listed in italics left the club mid-season.
- Source: The Big Brentford Book of the Eighties

=== Goalscorers ===
Pos.	Nat	Player	FL3	FAC	FLC	FLT	Total
FW	(England)	Dean Holdsworth	24	0	0	4	28
FW	(England)	Gary Blissett	11	0	2	0	13
MF	(Scotland)	Eddie May	8	0	2	2	12
MF	(England)	Neil Smillie	5	0	0	1	6
DF	(England)	Terry Evans	4	0	1	0	5
MF	(England)	Kevin Godfrey	2	0	1	0	3
MF	(England)	Allan Cockram	2	0	0	0	2
MF	(England)	Andy Driscoll	2	0	0	0	2
MF	(England)	Keith Jones	2	0	0	0	2
MF	(England)	Simon Ratcliffe	2	0	0	0	2
FW	(England)	Richard Cadette	1	0	0	1	2
DF	(England)	Sean Sparham	1	—	—	—	1
MF	(England)	John Moncur	1	—	—	0	1
DF	(England)	Roger Stanislaus	1	0	0	0	1
DF	(England)	Keith Millen	0	0	1	0	1
Total			66	0	7	8	81

- Players listed in italics left the club mid-season.
- Source: The Big Brentford Book of the Eighties

=== Management ===
Name	Nat	From	To	Record All Comps					Record League				
Name	Nat	From	To	P	W	D	L	W %	P	W	D	L	W %
Steve Perryman	(England)	19 August 1989	5 May 1990	55	22	9	24	40.00	46	18	7	21	39.13

=== Summary ===
Games played	55 (46 Third Division, 1 FA Cup, 4 League Cup, 4 Football League Trophy)
Games won	22 (18 Third Division, 0 FA Cup, 2 League Cup, 2 Football League Trophy)
Games drawn	9 (7 Third Division, 0 FA Cup, 1 League Cup, 1 Football League Trophy)
Games lost	24 (21 Third Division, 1 FA Cup, 1 League Cup, 1 Football League Trophy)
Goals scored	81 (66 Third Division, 0 FA Cup, 7 League Cup, 8 Football League Trophy)
Goals conceded	78 (66 Third Division, 1 FA Cup, 6 League Cup, 5 Football League Trophy)
Clean sheets	10 (8 Third Division, 0 FA Cup, 1 League Cup, 1 Football League Trophy)
Biggest league win	5–0 versus Blackpool, 28 April 1990
Worst league defeat	4–0 versus Blackpool, 11 November 1989
Most appearances	52, Terry Evans (44 Third Division, 1 FA Cup, 4 League Cup, 3 Football League Trophy), Neil Smillie (43 Third Division, 1 FA Cup, 4 League Cup, 4 Football League Trophy)
Top scorer (league)	24, Dean Holdsworth
Top scorer (all competitions)	28, Dean Holdsworth

== Transfers & loans ==
Players transferred in
Date	Pos.	Name	Previous club	Fee	Ref.
26 July 1989	MF	(Scotland) Eddie May	(Scotland) Hibernian	£167,000	
July 1989	DF	(England) Mark Fleming	(England) Queens Park Rangers	Free	
29 September 1989	FW	(England) Dean Holdsworth	(England) Watford	£125,000	
Players loaned in
Date from	Pos.	Name	From	Date to	Ref.
19 October 1989	MF	(England) John Moncur	(England) Tottenham Hotspur	November 1989	
24 November 1989	GK	(Republic of Ireland) Keith Branagan	(England) Millwall	December 1989	
November 1989	DF	(England) Paul Miller	(England) Bournemouth	December 1989	
22 March 1990	GK	(Scotland) Colin Scott	(Scotland) Rangers	April 1990	
22 March 1990	DF	(England) Sean Sparham	(England) Millwall	End of season	
Players transferred out
Date	Pos.	Name	Subsequent club	Fee	Ref.
29 March 1990	FW	(England) Andy Ansah	(England) Southend United	Free	
Players loaned out
Date from	Pos.	Name	To	Date to	Ref.
October 1989	MF	(England) Matthew Howard	(England) St Albans City	January 1990	
22 March 1990	FW	(England) Richard Cadette	(England) Bournemouth	End of season	
March 1990	MF	(Jamaica) Marcus Gayle	(Finland) KuPS	September 1990	
Players released
Date	Pos.	Name	Subsequent club	Join date	Ref.
January 1990	MF	(England) Matthew Howard	(England) St Albans City	January 1990	
May 1990	FW	(England) Kelly Haag	(England) Fulham	August 1990	

== Kit ==
Supplier: Hobot
Sponsor(s): KLM

Home	Away

Source: Brentford F.C.

== Awards ==
- Supporters' Player of the Year: Terry Evans
- Players' Player of the Year: Terry Evans
