= 1987–88 Brentford F.C. season =

English football team season

Brentford
1987–88 season
- Chairman: Martin Lange
- Player-manager: Steve Perryman
- Stadium: Griffin Park
- Third Division: 12th
- FA Cup: First round
- League Cup: First round
- Football League Trophy: First round
- Top goalscorer: League: Sinton (11); All: Sinton (12)
- Highest home attendance: 8,712
- Lowest home attendance: 2,005
- Average home league attendance: 4,581
Home colours	Away colours

During the 1987–88 English football season, Brentford competed in the Football League Third Division. The Bees contended for a place in the play-offs until a run of just two wins from the final 17 matches of the season dropped the club into mid-table.

== Season summary ==
After taking over as Brentford manager in January 1987, Steve Perryman continued the remodelling of his squad through the 1987 off-season. Transferred out were defender Phil Bater, midfielder Paul Maddy and forward Francis Joseph, with the deals raising £37,000. In came a number of players on free transfers or a trial basis, the most notable of whom being former Chelsea midfielder Colin Lee, in a dual player/Youth Development Officer role. After beginning the Third Division season in and around the relegation places, manager Perryman continued to buy and sell players, raising another £10,000 from the sale of defender Jamie Murray and winger Ian Holloway and bringing in former Chelsea midfielder Keith Jones for a £40,000 fee. With forward Gary Blissett failing to show form in front of goal and Andy Sinton almost single-handedly leading the attack from midfield, the loan signing of Paul Williams in October 1987 galvanised the team, with Williams scoring six goals in eight appearances before being recalled by Charlton Athletic. An eight-match unbeaten run from mid-November 1987 to 2 January 1988, despite the £30,000 sale of forward Robbie Cooke, put Brentford as high as 6th position, once place outside the play-off zone. The December loan signing of Arsenal midfielder Graham Rix proved key to the continued good form.

A 1–0 win over Blackpool at Bloomfield Road on 16 January 1988, courtesy of a Keith Millen goal, raised Brentford into the play-off zone. After 3–1 victory over rivals Fulham in the following league match and the recall of Graham Rix to Highbury, the Bees' form disintegrated. The team lost four consecutive matches in February without scoring a goal and would win just two of the final 17 matches of the season to finish in 12th place. Manager Steve Perryman had attempted to rectify the slump by signing midfielder Ian Stewart and forward Les Ferdinand on loan, but both proved to be a disappointment. Right back Roger Joseph's performances earned him a place in the Third Division PFA Team of the Year, the first time a Brentford player had been recognised by the PFA.

== League table ==
Pos	Team	Pld	W	D	L	GF	GA	GD	Pts
10	Blackpool	46	17	14	15	71	62	+9	65
11	Port Vale	46	18	11	17	58	56	+2	65
12	Brentford	46	16	14	16	53	59	−6	62
13	Gillingham	46	14	17	15	77	61	+16	59
14	Bury	46	15	14	17	58	57	+1	59

Rules for classification: 1) Points; 2) Goal difference; 3) Goals scored

== Results ==
Brentford's goal tally listed first.

=== Legend ===
Win	Draw	Loss

=== Pre-season and friendlies ===
Date	Opponent	Venue	Result	Attendance	Scorer(s)
23 July 1987	Camberley Town	A	2–0	n/a	Priddle, Blissett
27 July 1987	Truro City	A	6–2	n/a	Blissett (2), Cooke (pen), Sinton, Carroll, Holloway
1 August 1987	Yeading	A	0–1	n/a	
10 August 1987	Chelsea	H	0–3	n/a	
5 December 1987	Tottenham Hotspur	H	0–0	4,347	
15 April 1987	Southampton	H	0–2	n/a	

=== Football League Third Division ===
No.	Date	Opponent	Venue	Result	Attendance	Scorer(s)
1	15 August 1987	Sunderland	H	0–1	7,509	
2	29 August 1987	Bristol City	H	0–2	4,328	
3	31 August 1987	Grimsby Town	A	1–0	3,361	Blissett
4	5 September 1987	Rotherham United	H	1–1	3,604	Jones
5	9 September 1987	Northampton Town	A	1–2	5,748	Cooke (pen)
6	12 September 1987	Southend United	A	3–2	4,418	Blissett, Cooke, Sinton
7	15 September 1987	Chesterfield	H	2–0	3,183	Benjamin (og), Cooke (pen)
8	19 September 1987	Blackpool	H	2–1	3,886	Sinton, Smith
9	26 September 1987	Aldershot	A	1–4	3,651	Sinton
10	29 September 1987	Preston North End	A	2–1	4,241	Sinton, Carroll
11	3 October 1987	Port Vale	H	1–0	4,007	Sinton
12	10 October 1987	Bury	A	2–2	2,300	Bates, Sinton
13	17 October 1987	Walsall	H	0–0	5,056	
14	20 October 1987	Chester City	H	1–1	4,027	Cooke
15	24 October 1987	Brighton & Hove Albion	A	1–2	7,600	Stanislaus
16	31 October 1987	Bristol Rovers	H	1–1	4,487	Williams
17	3 November 1987	Gillingham	A	1–0	4,513	Thorne
18	7 November 1987	Notts County	A	0–3	5,634	
19	21 November 1987	Wigan Athletic	H	2–1	3,625	Sinton (pen), Williams
20	28 November 1987	Doncaster Rovers	A	1–0	1,360	Williams
21	12 December 1987	Mansfield Town	H	2–2	3,729	Carroll, Blissett
22	18 December 1987	York City	A	1–1	1,801	Turner
23	26 December 1987	Aldershot	H	3–0	5,578	Millen, Sinton, Birch
24	28 December 1987	Fulham	A	2–2	9,369	Evans, Birch
25	1 January 1988	Bristol City	A	3–2	12,877	Blissett (2), Sinton
26	2 January 1988	Southend United	H	1–0	5,752	Stanislaus
27	9 January 1988	Northampton Town	H	0–1	6,025	
28	16 January 1988	Blackpool	A	1–0	3,911	Millen
29	14 February 1988	Fulham	H	3–1	8,712	Blissett, Elkins (og), Millen
30	17 February 1988	Rotherham United	A	0–2	2,572	
31	20 February 1988	Sunderland	A	0–2	15,458	
32	23 February 1988	Grimsby Town	H	0–2	3,534	
33	27 February 1988	Port Vale	A	0–1	3,876	
34	1 March 1988	Preston North End	H	2–0	3,505	
35	5 March 1988	Walsall	A	2–4	4,548	Blissett, Evans
36	12 March 1988	Bury	H	0–3	3,920	
37	19 March 1988	Bristol Rovers	A	0–0	3,380	
38	26 March 1988	Brighton & Hove Albion	H	1–1	5,331	Lee
39	2 April 1988	Notts County	H	1–0	4,388	Blissett
40	4 April 1988	Wigan Athletic	A	1–1	3,297	Evans
41	9 April 1988	Gillingham	H	2–2	3,875	Sinton (2)
42	19 April 1988	Chesterfield	A	1–2	2,010	Turner
43	23 April 1988	Chester City	A	1–1	1,793	Cockram
44	30 April 1988	Doncaster Rovers	H	1–1	3,122	Cockram
45	2 May 1988	Mansfield Town	A	1–2	2,664	Carroll
46	7 May 1988	York City	H	1–2	4,180	Carroll

=== FA Cup ===
Round	Date	Opponent	Venue	Result	Attendance
1R	14 November 1987	Brighton & Hove Albion	H	0–2	6,358

=== Football League Cup ===
Round	Date	Opponent	Venue	Result	Attendance	Scorer(s)
R1 (1st leg)	18 August 1987	Southend United	H	2–1	2,837	Sinton, Blissett
R1 (2nd leg)	25 August 1987	Southend United	A	2–4 (lost 4–5 on aggregate)	2,111	Carroll, Cooke

=== Football League Trophy ===
Round	Date	Opponent	Venue	Result	Attendance	Scorer
SPR (match 1)	28 October 1987	Northampton Town	A	0–1	3,076	
SPR (match 2)	24 November 1987	Notts County	H	3–2	2,005	Williams (3)
SR1	19 January 1988	Wolverhampton Wanderers	A	0–4	6,298	

- Sources: 100 Years of Brentford, The Big Brentford Book of the Eighties, Statto

== Playing squad ==
Players' ages are as of the opening day of the 1987–88 season.

Pos.	Name	Nat.	Date of birth (age)	Signed from	Signed in	Notes
Goalkeepers
GK	Tony Oliver	(England)	22 September 1967 (aged 19)	Portsmouth	1987	
GK	Gary Phillips	(England)	20 September 1961 (aged 25)	Barnet	1984	
Defenders
DF	Jamie Bates	(England)	24 February 1968 (aged 19)	Youth	1986	
DF	Terry Evans	(England)	12 April 1965 (aged 22)	Hillingdon	1985	
DF	Matthew Howard	(England)	5 December 1970 (aged 16)	Youth	1988	
DF	Roger Joseph	(England)	24 December 1965 (aged 21)	Southall	1984	
DF	Keith Millen	(England)	26 September 1966 (aged 20)	Youth	1985	
DF	Roger Stanislaus	(England)	2 November 1968 (aged 18)	Arsenal	1987	
Midfielders
MF	Paul Buckle	(England)	16 December 1970 (aged 16)	Youth	1988	
MF	Robbie Carroll	(England)	15 February 1968 (aged 19)	Gosport Borough	1986	
MF	Allan Cockram	(England)	8 October 1963 (aged 23)	St Albans City	1988	
MF	Andy Feeley	(England)	30 September 1961 (aged 25)	Leicester City	1987	
MF	Keith Jones	(England)	14 October 1965 (aged 21)	Chelsea	1987	
MF	Colin Lee	(England)	12 June 1956 (aged 31)	Chelsea	1987	Youth Development Officer
MF	Steve Perryman	(England)	21 December 1951 (aged 35)	Oxford United	1986	Manager
MF	Andy Sinton	(England)	19 March 1966 (aged 21)	Cambridge United	1985	
MF	Paul Smith	(England)	5 October 1967 (aged 19)	Arsenal	1987	
MF	Wayne Turner (c)	(England)	9 March 1961 (aged 26)	Coventry City	1986	
Forwards
FW	Paul Birch	(England)	3 December 1968 (aged 18)	Portsmouth	1987	Loaned from Portsmouth before transferring permanently
FW	Gary Blissett	(England)	29 May 1964 (aged 23)	Crewe Alexandra	1987	
FW	Bob Booker	(England)	25 January 1958 (aged 29)	Bedmond Sports & Social	1978	
Players who left the club mid-season
DF	Jamie Murray	(Scotland)	27 December 1958 (aged 28)	Cambridge United	1984	Transferred to Cambridge United
MF	Ian Holloway	(England)	12 March 1963 (aged 24)	Wimbledon	1986	Transferred to Bristol Rovers
MF	Sean Priddle	(England)	14 December 1965 (aged 21)	Exeter City	1987	Released
MF	Graham Rix	(England)	23 October 1957 (aged 29)	Portsmouth	1987	Returned to Portsmouth after loan
MF	Ian Stewart	(Northern Ireland)	10 September 1961 (aged 25)	Arsenal	1988	Returned to Arsenal after loan
MF	Steve Thorne	(England)	15 September 1968 (aged 18)	Watford	1987	Released
FW	Robbie Cooke	(England)	16 February 1957 (aged 30)	Cambridge United	1984	Transferred to Millwall
FW	Les Ferdinand	(England)	8 December 1966 (aged 20)	Queens Park Rangers	1987	Returned to Queens Park Rangers after loan
FW	Warren Gravette	(England)	13 September 1968 (aged 18)	Tottenham Hotspur	1987	Released
FW	Paul Williams	(England)	16 April 1965 (aged 22)	Charlton Athletic	1987	Returned to Charlton Athletic after loan

- Sources: The Big Brentford Book of the Eighties, Timeless Bees

== Coaching staff ==
Name	Role
(England) Steve Perryman	Manager
(England) Phil Holder	Assistant Manager
(England) Roy Clare	Physiotherapist

== Statistics ==
=== Appearances and goals ===
Substitute appearances in brackets.

Pos	Nat	Name	League		FA Cup		League Cup		FL Trophy		Total	
Pos	Nat	Name	Apps	Goals	Apps	Goals	Apps	Goals	Apps	Goals	Apps	Goals
GK	(England)	Tony Oliver	11	0	0	0	0	0	0	0	11	0
GK	(England)	Gary Phillips	35	0	1	0	2	0	3	0	41	0
DF	(England)	Jamie Bates	20 (3)	1	0	0	1	0	2	0	23 (3)	1
DF	(England)	Terry Evans	29	4	1	0	0	0	2	0	32	4
DF	(England)	Matthew Howard	0 (1)	0	0	0	0	0	0	0	0 (1)	0
DF	(England)	Roger Joseph	43	0	1	0	2	0	3	0	49	0
DF	(England)	Keith Millen	40	3	0	0	2	0	2	0	44	3
DF	(Scotland)	Jamie Murray	4	0	—		2	0	—		6	0
DF	(England)	Roger Stanislaus	36 (1)	2	1	0	—		3	0	40 (1)	2
MF	(England)	Paul Buckle	0 (1)	0	0	0	0	0	0	0	0 (1)	0
MF	(England)	Robbie Carroll	8 (4)	4	0 (1)	0	2	1	0 (1)	0	10 (6)	5
MF	(England)	Allan Cockram	7	2	—		—		—		7	2
MF	(England)	Andy Feeley	27 (7)	0	1	0	2	0	2	0	32 (7)	0
MF	(England)	Ian Holloway	1	0	—		—		—		1	0
MF	(England)	Keith Jones	34 (2)	1	1	0	—		1	0	36 (2)	1
MF	(England)	Colin Lee	19 (3)	1	1	0	2	0	1	0	23 (3)	1
MF	(England)	Steve Perryman	16 (5)	0	1	0	1 (1)	0	3	0	21 (6)	0
MF	(England)	Sean Priddle	5 (1)	0	0	0	0	0	0	0	5 (1)	0
MF	(England)	Andy Sinton	46	11	1	0	2	1	3	0	52	12
MF	(England)	Paul Smith	10 (7)	1	0	0	0	0	1 (1)	0	11 (8)	1
MF	(England)	Steve Thorne	1	1	1	0	0	0	0	0	2	1
MF	(England)	Wayne Turner	24	2	0	0	0	0	2	0	26	2
FW	(England)	Paul Birch	13 (3)	2	—		—		1	0	14 (3)	2
FW	(England)	Gary Blissett	40 (1)	9	0	0	2	1	2	0	44 (1)	10
FW	(England)	Bob Booker	1 (11)	0	0 (1)	0	0	0	0 (2)	0	1 (14)	0
FW	(England)	Robbie Cooke	15 (1)	4	1	0	2	1	1	0	19 (1)	5
FW	(England)	Warren Gravette	1 (4)	0	0	0	0	0	0	0	1 (4)	0
Players loaned in during the season
MF	(Northern Ireland)	Ian Stewart	4 (3)	0	—		—		—		4 (3)	0
MF	(England)	Graham Rix	6	0	—		—		—		6	0
FW	(England)	Les Ferdinand	3	0	—		—		—		3	0
FW	(England)	Paul Williams	7	3	—		—		1	3	8	6

- Players listed in italics left the club mid-season.
- Source: The Big Brentford Book of the Eighties

=== Goalscorers ===
Pos.	Nat	Player	FL3	FAC	FLC	FLT	Total
MF	(England)	Andy Sinton	11	0	1	0	12
FW	(England)	Gary Blissett	9	0	1	0	10
FW	(England)	Paul Williams	3	—	—	3	6
MF	(England)	Robbie Carroll	4	0	1	0	5
FW	(England)	Robbie Cooke	4	0	1	0	5
DF	(England)	Terry Evans	4	0	0	0	4
DF	(England)	Keith Millen	3	0	0	0	3
MF	(England)	Allan Cockram	2	—	—	—	2
FW	(England)	Paul Birch	2	—	—	0	2
DF	(England)	Roger Stanislaus	2	0	—	0	2
MF	(England)	Wayne Turner	2	0	0	0	2
MF	(England)	Keith Jones	1	0	—	0	1
DF	(England)	Jamie Bates	1	0	0	0	1
MF	(England)	Colin Lee	1	0	0	0	1
MF	(England)	Paul Smith	1	0	0	0	1
MF	(England)	Steve Thorne	1	0	0	0	1
Opponents			2	0	0	0	2
Total			53	0	4	3	60

- Players listed in italics left the club mid-season.
- Source: The Big Brentford Book of the Eighties

=== Management ===
Name	Nat	From	To	Record All Comps					Record League				
Name	Nat	From	To	P	W	D	L	W %	P	W	D	L	W %
Steve Perryman	(England)	15 August 1987	7 May 1988	52	18	14	20	34.62	46	16	14	16	34.78

=== Summary ===
Games played	52 (46 Third Division, 1 FA Cup, 2 League Cup, 3 Football League Trophy)
Games won	18 (16 Third Division, 0 FA Cup, 1 League Cup, 1 Football League Trophy)
Games drawn	14 (14 Third Division, 0 FA Cup, 0 League Cup, 0 Football League Trophy)
Games lost	20 (16 Third Division, 1 FA Cup, 1 League Cup, 2 Football League Trophy)
Goals scored	60 (53 Third Division, 0 FA Cup, 4 League Cup, 3 Football League Trophy)
Goals conceded	73 (59 Third Division, 2 FA Cup, 5 League Cup, 7 Football League Trophy)
Clean sheets	13 (13 Third Division, 0 FA Cup, 0 League Cup, 0 Football League Trophy)
Biggest league win	3–0 versus Aldershot, 26 December 1987
Worst league defeat	3–0 on two occasions; 4–1 versus Aldershot, 26 September 1987
Most appearances	52, Andy Sinton (46 Third Division, 1 FA Cup, 2 League Cup, 3 Football League Trophy)
Top scorer (league)	11, Andy Sinton
Top scorer (all competitions)	12, Andy Sinton

== Transfers & loans ==
Players transferred in
Date	Pos.	Name	Previous club	Fee	Ref.
July 1987	FW	(England) Warren Gravette	(England) Tottenham Hotspur	Free	
July 1987	MF	(England) Colin Lee	(England) Chelsea	n/a	
July 1987	GK	(England) Tony Oliver	(England) Portsmouth	Trial	
July 1987	MF	(England) Sean Priddle	(England) Exeter City	Free	
August 1987	MF	(England) Andy Feeley	(England) Leicester City	Trial	
27 August 1987	MF	(England) Paul Smith	(England) Arsenal	Trial	
3 September 1987	MF	(England) Keith Jones	(England) Chelsea	£40,000	
18 September 1987	DF	(England) Roger Stanislaus	(England) Arsenal	Trial	
September 1987	MF	(England) Steve Thorne	(England) Watford	Trial	
1987	MF	(England) Paul Buckle	n/a	n/a	
1987	DF	(England) Jason Cousins	n/a	n/a	
1987	MF	(Jamaica) Marcus Gayle	n/a	n/a	
1987	DF	(England) Matthew Howard	(England) Watford	n/a	
January 1988	FW	(England) Paul Birch	(England) Portsmouth	£10,000	
22 March 1988	MF	(England) Allan Cockram	(England) St Albans City	Non-contract	
Players loaned in
Date from	Pos.	Name	From	Date to	Ref.
20 October 1987	FW	(England) Paul Williams	(England) Charlton Athletic	November 1987	
December 1987	FW	(England) Paul Birch	(England) Portsmouth	January 1988	
December 1987	MF	(England) Graham Rix	(England) Arsenal	February 1988	
February 1988	MF	(Northern Ireland) Ian Stewart	(England) Portsmouth	March 1988	
24 March 1988	FW	(England) Les Ferdinand	(England) Queens Park Rangers	April 1988	
Players transferred out
Date	Pos.	Name	Subsequent club	Fee	Ref.
July 1987	DF	(Wales) Phil Bater	(Wales) Cardiff City	£5,000	
July 1987	FW	(England) Francis Joseph	(England) Reading	£25,000	
July 1987	MF	(Wales) Paul Maddy	(England) Chester City	£7,000	
21 August 1987	MF	(England) Ian Holloway	(England) Bristol Rovers	£5,000	
September 1987	DF	(Scotland) Jamie Murray	(England) Cambridge United	£5,000	
11 December 1987	FW	(England) Robbie Cooke	(England) Millwall	£30,000	
Players loaned out
Date from	Pos.	Name	To	Date to	Ref.
1987	FW	(England) Francis Joseph	(Finland) HJK Helsinki	July 1987	
January 1988	n/a	(England) Mark Gill	(England) Feltham	n/a	
January 1988	n/a	(England) Chris Good	(England) Hitchin Town	n/a	
Players released
Date	Pos.	Name	Subsequent club	Join date	Ref.
January 1988	MF	(England) Steve Thorne	n/a	n/a	
April 1988	n/a	(England) Chris Good	n/a	n/a	
April 1988	FW	(England) Warren Gravette	(England) Maidenhead United	April 1988	
April 1988	MF	(England) Sean Priddle	(England) Weymouth	1988	
May 1988	n/a	(England) Mark Gill	n/a	n/a	
May 1988	MF	(England) Paul Smith	(England) Bristol Rovers	15 July 1988	

== Awards ==
- Supporters' Player of the Year: Andy Sinton
- Players' Player of the Year: Roger Joseph
- Third Division PFA Team of the Year: Roger Joseph
