= Tony Oliver (disambiguation) =

Anthony or Tony Oliver may refer to:

- Anthony Oliver (1922–1995), Welsh actor
- Tony Oliver (born 1958), Puerto Rican voice actor
- Tony Oliver (footballer) (born 1967), English footballer
- Tony Oliver (referee) (born 1931), English football referee
