= Mark Fleming (footballer) =

English footballer

Personal information
- Full name: Mark John Fleming
- Date of birth: 11 August 1969 (age 57)
- Place of birth: Hammersmith, England
- Position: Left back

Youth career
- 1987–1988: Queens Park Rangers

Senior career*
Years	Team	Apps	(Gls)
1988–1989	Queens Park Rangers	3	(0)
1989–1991	Brentford	35	(1)
1991–1992	Farnborough Town	23	(0)
1992–1993	Woking	29	(5)
1993–1995	Aylesbury United	35	(3)
1996–1998	Staines Town		
- * Club domestic league appearances and goals

Mark John Fleming (born 11 August 1969) is an English retired professional footballer who played as a left back in the Football League for Brentford and Queens Park Rangers.

== Career ==
=== Queens Park Rangers ===
Fleming began his career as a left back at First Division club Queens Park Rangers and made two appearances during the 1987–88 season. He also made an appearance in Rangers' 1988 President's Cup campaign. After just one appearance during the 1988–89 season, Fleming departed Loftus Road.

=== Brentford ===
Fleming joined Third Division club Brentford in July 1989. He deputised for the injured Roger Stanislaus during the 1989–90 season and after the departure of Stanislaus in 1990, Fleming was expected to make the left back position his own in 1990–91. He failed to secure a place in the team and was replaced by loanees Stuart Cash and Jim Carstairs. Fleming rejected a monthly contract and departed at the end of the 1990–91 season, having made 45 appearances and scored one goal during his two years at Griffin Park.

=== Farnborough Town ===
After his release from Brentford, Fleming dropped into non-League football and joined Conference club Farnborough Town. In 1992, he joined divisional rivals Woking and later played for Isthmian League Premier Division clubs Aylesbury United and Staines Town, captaining the latter club.

== Career statistics ==
Appearances and goals by club, season and competition
Club	Season	League			FA Cup		League Cup		Other		Total	
Club	Season	Division	Apps	Goals	Apps	Goals	Apps	Goals	Apps	Goals	Apps	Goals
Queens Park Rangers	1987–88	First Division	2	0	0	0	0	0	0	0	2	0
Queens Park Rangers	1988–89	First Division	1	0	0	0	0	0	0	0	1	0
Queens Park Rangers	Total		3	0	0	0	0	0	0	0	3	0
Brentford	1989–90	Third Division	17	0	0	0	0	0	1 (Note: Appearances in Football League Trophy)	0	18	0
Brentford	1990–91	Third Division	18	1	3	0	2	0	4	0	27	1
Brentford	Total		35	1	3	0	2	0	5	0	45	1
Aylesbury United	1993–94	Isthmian League Premier Division	33	3	1	0	—		12 (Note: 5 appearances and 1 goal in Berks & Bucks Senior Cup, 2 appearances in FA Trophy, 2 appearances in Isthmian League Cup, 2 appearances in Buckingham Senior Charity Cup, 1 appearance in ClubCall Cup)	1	46	4
Aylesbury United	1994–95	Isthmian League Premier Division	2	0	0	0	—		0	0	2	0
Aylesbury United	Total		35	3	1	0	—		13	1	48	4
Career total			73	4	4	0	2	0	18	1	96	5
