= Wayne Turner =

Wayne Turner may refer to:

- Wayne Turner (basketball) (born 1976), retired American professional basketball player
- Wayne Turner (footballer) (born 1961), English former footballer
- Wayne Turner (ice hockey)
- Wayne Turner (born 1954), American politician and Green Party candidate for Governor of North Carolina in 2024
