= Graeme Power =

Graeme Power may refer to:

- Graeme Power (footballer, born 1977), English footballer
- Graeme Power (footballer, born 1959), English football goalkeeper
