= Andy Driscoll =

English footballer and manager

Personal information
- Full name: Andrew Driscoll
- Date of birth: 21 October 1971 (age 55)
- Place of birth: Staines-upon-Thames, England
- Position: Right winger

Youth career
- 1985–1987: Queens Park Rangers
- 1987–1988: West Ham United
- 1988–1989: Brentford

Senior career*
Years	Team	Apps	(Gls)
1989–1992	Brentford	14	(2)
1991	→ Staines Town (loan)		
1992–1993	Yeading		
1993	Chertsey Town		
1993	Papatoetoe		
1993–1994	Hayes		
1994–1995	St Albans City	45	(10)
1995	Hayes		
1995–1996	St Albans City	7	(0)
1996	Hendon	15	(1)
1996	Crawley Town	14	(0)
1996–1997	St Albans City	1	(0)
1997	Yeading		
1997–1998	Staines Town		
1999	Walton & Hersham		
2002	Brook House		
2002–2003	Ashford Town (Middlesex)		
2003	Marlow		
2004	Hounslow Borough		
2005–2006	Flackwell Heath	20	(1)
2006	Brook House		
2008	Flackwell Heath	4	(0)
2008	Burnham		

Managerial career
- 2004: Hounslow Borough (player-assistant manager)
- 2005–2006: Flackwell Heath (player-manager)
- 2008: Flackwell Heath (player-manager)
- * Club domestic league appearances and goals

Andrew Driscoll (born 21 October 1971) is an English retired professional footballer and manager who played in the Football League for Brentford. A knee injury saw Driscoll released in 1992 and he dropped into non-League football. He now works as a personal trainer.

== Playing career ==
=== Brentford ===
After beginning his career in the youth systems at Queens Park Rangers and West Ham United, Driscoll joined the youth team at Third Division club Brentford in September 1988. He was a part of the youth team which reached the semi-finals of the 1988–89 FA Youth Cup. Driscoll made his first team debut in a 4–2 defeat to Bolton Wanderers on 6 May 1989, coming on as a substitute for Andy Feeley. He remained out of the first team picture until an injury to Eddie May saw Driscoll play the final 12 games of the 1989–90 season on the right wing, scoring two goals. Driscoll signed a professional contract at the end of the season, but suffered a serious knee ligament injury during 1990–91 pre-season. After returning to fitness, he managed just one further appearance before his release by the Bees at the end of the 1991–92 season. Driscoll made 14 appearances and scored two goals for the club.

=== Non-League football ===
After failed trials with league clubs Reading and Torquay United in 1992, Driscoll went on to enjoy a long career in non-League football, playing in the Isthmian, Southern, Spartan South Midlands and the Hellenic Leagues for Yeading, Chertsey Town, Hayes, Hendon, Crawley Town, St Albans City, Staines Town, Brook House, Ashford Town (Middlesex), Marlow, Hounslow Borough, Flackwell Heath, Maidenhead United, Burnham and Walton & Hersham. He also briefly played in New Zealand for Papatoetoe.

== Managerial career ==
Driscoll had his first taste of management as player-assistant manager under former Brentford teammate Chris Sparks at Hellenic League First Division South club Hounslow Borough between May and December 2004. Driscoll later had two spells as player-manager at Isthmian League Second Division club Flackwell Heath.

== Conditioning coach career ==
Driscoll was appointed by former Brentford teammate Paul Buckle as a performance and fitness coach when Buckle managed Torquay United (2009–2011), Bristol Rovers (2011–2012) and Luton Town (2012–2013). In July 2014, Driscoll returned to Staines Town, where he was enlisted by former Brentford teammate Marcus Gayle to condition the players at the Conference South club.

== Personal life ==
Driscoll has worked as a personal trainer since 1996, specialising in football, golf and athletics performance and fitness.

== Career statistics ==
Appearances and goals by club, season and competition
Club	Season	League			FA Cup		League Cup		Other		Total	
Club	Season	Division	Apps	Goals	Apps	Goals	Apps	Goals	Apps	Goals	Apps	Goals
Brentford	1988–89	Third Division	1	0	0	0	0	0	0	0	1	0
Brentford	1989–90	Third Division	12	2	0	0	0	0	0	0	12	2
Brentford	1991–92	Third Division	1	0	0	0	0	0	0	0	1	0
Brentford	Total		14	2	0	0	0	0	0	0	14	2
St Albans City	1993–94	Isthmian League Premier Division	9	2	—		—		1 (Note: Appearance in Isthmian League Full Members Cup)	0	10	2
St Albans City	1994–95	Isthmian League Premier Division	36	8	4	2	—		23 (Note: 4 appearances and 2 goals in Isthmian League Cup, 4 appearances and 1 goal in Herts Senior Cup, 4 appearances and 1 goal in Herts Charity Cup, 4 appearances and 1 goal in Eastern Floodlight Cup, 3 appearances and 1 goal in London Challenge Cup, 2 appearances and 1 goal in FA Trophy, 1 appearance in Isthmian League Full Members Cup, 1 appearance in East Anglian Cup)	7	63	17
St Albans City	Total		45	10	4	2	—		24	7	73	19
St Albans City	1995–96	Isthmian League Premier Division	7	0	0	0	—		5 (Note: 1 appearance and 1 goal in FA Trophy, 1 appearance in Isthmian League Full Members Cup, 1 appearance in London Challenge Cup, 1 appearance in Herts Senior Cup, 1 appearance in Eastern Floodlight Cup)	1	12	1
Hendon	1995–96	Isthmian League Premier Division	15	1	—		—		—		15	1
Crawley Town	1996–97	Southern League Premier Division	14	0	2	0	—		1 (Note: 1 appearance in Southern League Cup)	0	17	0
St Albans City	1996–97	Isthmian League Premier Division	1	0	—		—		2 (Note: 1 appearance in Herts Senior Cup, 1 appearance in East Anglian Cup)	0	3	0
St Albans City	Total		53	10	4	2	—		31	8	88	20
Flackwell Heath	2005–06	Isthmian League Second Division	20	1	0	0	—		2 (Note: 2 appearances in Isthmian League Associate Members Trophy)	0	22	1
Flackwell Heath	2007–08	Hellenic League Premier Division	4	0	0	0	—		3 (Note: 2 appearances in Hellenic League Floodlit Cup, 1 appearance in Hellenic League Supplementary Cup)	0	7	0
Flackwell Heath	Total		24	1	0	0	—		5	0	29	1
Career total			120	14	6	2	0	0	36	8	163	24
