= Stuart Cash =

English footballer

Personal information
- Full name: Stuart Paul Cash
- Date of birth: 5 September 1965 (age 61)
- Place of birth: Tipton, England
- Height: 1.78 m (5 ft 10 in)
- Position: Left back

Youth career
- 1983–1984: Wolverhampton Wanderers

Senior career*
Years	Team	Apps	(Gls)
1984–1986	Bilston Town		
1986–1988	Stourbridge		
1988–1989	Halesowen Town	64	(3)
1989–1992	Nottingham Forest	0	(0)
1990	→ Rotherham United (loan)	8	(1)
1990	→ Brentford (loan)	11	(0)
1991	→ Wycombe Wanderers (loan)	12	(0)
1991	→ Shrewsbury Town (loan)	8	(1)
1992–1994	Chesterfield	29	(0)
1994	Wycombe Wanderers	0	(0)
1994	Stevenage Borough	5	(0)
1994–1997	Chertsey Town		
1997	Slough Town	4	(0)
1997	Chesham United		
1997	Halesowen Town	6	(0)
1997	Enfield		
1997–2000	Aldershot Town	28	(2)

Managerial career
- 2002: Aldershot Town (caretaker)
- 2004: St Albans City
- * Club domestic league appearances and goals

Stuart Paul Cash (born 5 September 1965) is an English retired footballer who played in the Football League for Chesterfield, Brentford, Rotherham United and Shrewsbury Town as a left back. He had a long career in non-League football and entered management while still a player. He had a long association with Terry Brown and worked as Brown's assistant at Aldershot Town, AFC Wimbledon, Margate and Basingstoke Town.

== Career ==
=== Early years ===
After leaving school, Cash signed a one-year apprenticeship deal in 1983 at the club he supported as a boy, Wolverhampton Wanderers. A broken ankle saw Cash released at the end of his first year and he dropped into non-League football and played for Southern League Midland Division clubs Bilston Town, Stourbridge and Halesowen Town. He was a part of the Halesowen Town team which reached the first round proper of the 1988–89 FA Cup.

=== Nottingham Forest ===
Cash signed for First Division club Nottingham Forest in September 1989 for a £15,000 fee, after being scouted by assistant manager Ron Fenton while playing for Halesowen Town. Despite training with the first team squad throughout his time with the club, Cash was never in favour with manager Brian Clough and instead played for the reserve team and away on loan.

Cash joined Third Division club Rotherham United in March 1990, on a loan running until the end of the 1989–90 season. He made his professional debut and scored his first professional goal with the Millers, making eight appearances during his spell. Cash was the subject of a transfer bid by Rotherham, but the club could not meet Nottingham Forest's asking price.

Cash joined Third Division club Brentford on a three-month loan in September 1990, as a temporary replacement for the out-of-form Mark Fleming. Cash made 14 appearances for the Bees and his performances led manager Phil Holder to consider signing him on a permanent basis, though Holder's interest later cooled. Cash returned to Nottingham Forest when his loan expired and remarked in 2009 that his loan at Griffin Park was the best period of his playing career.

Cash dropped down to the Conference to sign for Wycombe Wanderers in March 1991, on a loan running until the end of the 1990–91 season. He made 12 league appearances during his spell and played in the Chairboys' 2–1 win over Kidderminster Harriers in the 1991 FA Trophy Final at Wembley Stadium. Cash was once again the subject of a bid for a permanent deal, which fell through over his wage demands.

Cash joined Third Division strugglers Shrewsbury Town on a two-month loan in September 1991. He made eight league appearances and scored one goal during his time at Gay Meadow. Cash departed Nottingham Forest in August 1992, having failed to make a single first team appearance during three years at the City Ground.

=== Chesterfield ===
Cash signed a contract with Third Division club Chesterfield in August 1992. He failed to stake a regular place in the team and suffered an anterior cruciate ligament injury in his second season with the Spireites. Cash made 39 appearances and scored one goal before departing in August 1994.

=== Return to Wycombe Wanderers ===
Cash rejoined Wycombe Wanderers (which by then had ascended to the Second Division) in August 1994. He failed to make an appearance for the club before departing two months later.

=== Return to non-League football ===
Cash dropped back into non-League football to join Conference club Stevenage Borough in October 1994. He made his debut in a 2–1 win over Altrincham on 15 October. After five further appearances, Cash joined Isthmian League First Division club Chertsey Town in November 1994. He had a successful first season, with the Curfews finishing third and securing promotion to the Isthmian League Premier Division. He remained with Chertsey for a further 18 months, before departing in January 1997.

Cash moved back up to the Conference to sign for Slough Town in January 1997. He made four appearances before having a brief spell with high-flying Isthmian League First Division club Chesham United in February 1997. Nearly eight years after his departure, Cash returned to Halesowen Town in March 1997. He remained with the Southern League Premier Division club until the end of the 1996–97 season.

Cash transferred to Isthmian League Premier Division club Enfield in July 1997. He followed Enfield manager George Borg to Isthmian League First Division club Aldershot Town in September 1997. Over the course of the 1997–98 season he made 20 league appearances and scored two goals as the Shots won the Division One title. He won the Isthmian League Cup with the club in the following season. Cash made the final appearance of his career in December 1999 and retired at the end of the 1999–2000 season, having made 49 appearances and scored three goals for Aldershot.

== Managerial and coaching career ==
=== Chertsey Town ===
While a player at Chertsey Town, Cash also served as assistant manager.

=== Enfield ===
Cash served as player-assistant manager under George Borg while briefly at Enfield in 1997.

=== Aldershot Town ===
Cash began his career at Aldershot Town as player-assistant manager under George Borg, before taking on the role full-time after his retirement in 2000. He had a successful time working under Borg, winning the Isthmian League First Division in the 1997–98 season, the Isthmian League Cup in 1998–99, the Isthmian League Premier Division title in 2002–03 and four Hampshire Senior Cups. After the departure of Borg in January 2002, Cash held the role of caretaker manager and continued in the role of assistant manager after the appointment of Terry Brown two months later. The club's decision to go full-time for the 2004–05 season saw Cash leave the club in November 2004, citing work commitments.

=== St Albans City ===
Cash joined Conference South club St Albans City as manager in November 2004, replacing Steve Castle. He lasted just eight days and two games in the role before departing the club, citing work commitments in Brighton.

=== Lewes ===
After a break from football, Cash was appointed Steve King's assistant at Conference South club Lewes prior to the beginning of the 2005–06 season. The pair won the Sussex Senior Challenge Cup and achieved a fourth-place finish in the league. He departed the club at the end of the 2006–07 season.

=== AFC Wimbledon ===
Cash reunited with Terry Brown at Isthmian League Premier Division club AFC Wimbledon in May 2007. Under the management of the pair, the club won the 2008 Isthmian League play-offs, the 2008–09 Conference South title and promotion to The Football League with a victory over Luton Town in the 2011 Conference Premier play-off final. The pair guided the Dons to a mid-table finish in the club's first season in League Two, but a poor run of form in the first month of the 2012–13 season saw Cash and Brown removed from their posts in September 2012.

=== Luton Town ===
Cash reunited with former Brentford and Aldershot Town teammate Paul Buckle at Conference Premier club Luton Town in January 2013, replacing Paul Carden as assistant manager under Buckle. As part of a three-way coaching team with Alan Neilson and Carl Emberson, Cash lasted just two months before following Buckle and Emberson out of Kenilworth Road, after the appointment of John Still as manager.

=== Margate ===
Cash reunited with Terry Brown at Isthmian League Premier Division club Margate in December 2013. After finishing the 2013–14 season in mid-table, the pair steered the Gate to a third-place finish the following year and promotion through the playoffs. A poor start to the 2015–16 National League South season led to Brown and Cash being removed from their posts on 5 December 2015.

=== Basingstoke Town ===
Terry Brown was appointed manager at National League South club Basingstoke Town in late March 2016 and installed Cash as his assistant. He departed the club at the end of the 2016–17 season.

== Personal life ==
Cash's sons Matty and Adam both became footballers. Matty made his debut for the Poland national team in 2021. Cash's daughter Hannah works as a reporter for CBS Sports.

== Career statistics ==
Appearances and goals by club, season and competition
Club	Season	League			FA Cup		League Cup		Other		Total	
Club	Season	Division	Apps	Goals	Apps	Goals	Apps	Goals	Apps	Goals	Apps	Goals
Rotherham United (loan)	1989–90	Third Division	8	1	—		—		—		8	1
Brentford (loan)	1990–91	Third Division	11	0	—		2	0	1	0	14	0
Chesterfield	1992–93	Third Division	23	0	1	0	4	0	3 (Note: Appearances in FA Trophy)	0	31	0
Chesterfield	1993–94	Third Division	6	0	0	0	1	0	1	0	8	0
Chesterfield	Total		29	0	1	0	5	0	4	0	39	1
Stevenage Borough	1994–95	Conference	5	0	—		—		—		5	0
Slough Town	1996–97	Conference	4	0	—		—		—		4	0
Career total			57	1	1	0	7	0	5	0	70	1

== Honours ==
Wycombe Wanderers

- FA Trophy: 1990–91

Aldershot Town

- Isthmian League First Division: 1997–98
- Isthmian League Cup: 1998–99
