= Allan Cockram =

English footballer

Personal information
- Full name: Allan Charles Cockram
- Date of birth: 8 October 1963 (age 63)
- Place of birth: Kensington, England
- Height: 5 ft 7 in (1.70 m)
- Positions: Midfielder; winger

Team information
- Current team: Cambridge University (manager)

Youth career
- 1975–1981: Tottenham Hotspur

Senior career*
Years	Team	Apps	(Gls)
1981–1985	Tottenham Hotspur	2	(0)
1985	San Francisco Flyers		
1985	Bristol Rovers	1	(0)
1985	San Jose (indoor)		
1985–1986	Farnborough Town		
1987–1988	St Albans City	44	(25)
1988–1991	Brentford	90	(14)
1991	Woking		
1991–1992	Reading	6	(1)
1992	Farnborough Town		
1992	Woking		
1992–1996	St Albans City	98	(25)
1996–1997	Chertsey Town		
1999–2000	Leatherhead		

International career
- England Youth

Managerial career
- 1985: San Francisco Flyers
- 1994–1996: St Albans City (player-manager)
- 1996–1997: Chertsey Town (player-manager)
- 2019–: Cambridge University
- * Club domestic league appearances and goals

Allan Charles Cockram (born 8 October 1963) is an English retired professional footballer who played in the Football League for Tottenham Hotspur, Bristol Rovers, Brentford and Reading as a midfielder or winger. He later player-managed St Albans City and Chertsey Town in non-League football. Cockram is the founder of the Brentford Penguins, a Down Syndrome football club associated with Brentford which featured in the 2023 documentary film Mighty Penguins.

== Playing career ==
A winger, Cockram joined Tottenham Hotspur as a schoolboy in 1975 and went on to make two first team appearances for the Lilywhites towards the end of the 1983–84 season. He was released at the end of the 1984–85 season and a two-year period followed as a football nomad, which included short periods playing for Bristol Rovers and Farnborough Town and two spells in the United States. A move to Isthmian League Premier Division club St Albans City during the latter part of the 1986–87 season, in a bid to return to fitness following an achilles injury, proved to be the turning point in Cockram's career. He was voted the Saints' Player of the Year at the end of the 1987–88 season.

After a successful period training full-time with Brentford during the 1987–88 season, Cockram signed a contract with the club in March 1988. He made 118 appearances and scored 17 goals for the club before his release at the end of the 1990–91 season. After a spell back in non-League football with Woking, Cockram made a return to the Football League with Reading in October 1991 and rejoined St Albans City prior to the beginning of the 1992–93 season. He remained at Clarence Park until the end of 1995–96 season and scored 73 goals in 211 appearances across his six seasons with the club. Cockram finished his career with spells at non-League clubs Chertsey Town and Leatherhead.

== Managerial and coaching career ==
Cockram player-managed non-League clubs St Albans City and Chertsey Town. He was later a technical specialist at Philadelphia Union and coached at University College London. In 2019, he became manager of Cambridge University.

In 2017, Cockram established Brentford Penguins, a Down Syndrome football club. A documentary film about the club, entitled Mighty Penguins, was released in 2023. Fellow former footballer David Beckham, and his son Romeo, met the Mighty Penguins team in September 2023, and presented Cockram with The Sun's Who Cares Wins Unsung Hero Award.

== International career ==
Cockram represented England Youth.

== Personal life ==
Cockram worked as a firefighter in west London and later became a businessman.

== Career statistics ==
Appearances and goals by club, season and competition
Club	Season	League			National cup (Note: Includes FA Cup)		League cup (Note: Includes Football League Cup)		Europe		Other		Total	
Club	Season	Division	Apps	Goals	Apps	Goals	Apps	Goals	Apps	Goals	Apps	Goals	Apps	Goals
Tottenham Hotspur	1983–84	First Division	2	0	0	0	0	0	0	0	—		2	0
Bristol Rovers	1985–86	Third Division	1	0	—		1	0	—		—		2	0
St Albans City	1986–87	Isthmian League Premier Division	11	4	—		—		—		2 (Note: 1 appearance and 2 goals in Herts Charity Cup, 1 appearance in Wallspan Floodlit Cup)	2	13	6
St Albans City	1987–88	Isthmian League Premier Division	33	21	0	0	—		—		9 (Note: 2 appearances and 3 goals in Herts Charity Cup, 2 appearances and 2 goals in Isthmian League Cup, 2 appearances and 1 goal in Herts Senior Cup, 1 appearance in FA Trophy, 1 appearance in General Motors Acceptance Challenge Cup, 1 appearance and 2 goals in Wycombe Floodlight Cup)	8	42	29
St Albans City	Total		44	25	0	0	—		—		11	10	55	35
Brentford	1987–88	Third Division	7	2	—		—		—		—		7	2
Brentford	1988–89	Third Division	37	7	7	2	3	0	—		4 (Note: Appearances in Football League Trophy)	1	51	10
Brentford	1989–90	Third Division	26	2	0	0	2	0	—		3	0	31	2
Brentford	1990–91	Third Division	20	3	3	0	0	0	—		6	0	29	3
Brentford	Total		90	14	10	2	5	0	—		13	1	118	17
Reading	1991–92	Third Division	6	1	1	0	—		—		1	0	8	1
St Albans City	1992–93	Isthmian League Premier Division	35	12	6	3	—		—		17 (Note: 4 appearances and 1 goal in FA Trophy, 3 appearances in Herts Charity Cup, 3 appearances in East Anglian Cup, 2 appearances and 1 goal in Herts Senior Cup, 2 appearances in Eastern Floodlight Cup, 1 appearance in Isthmian League Cup, 1 appearance and 1 goal in Isthmian League Full Members Cup, 1 appearance and 1 goal in Billy Minter Trophy)	4	58	19
St Albans City	1993–94	Isthmian League Premier Division	28	7	1	0	—		—		10 (Note: 3 appearances and 1 goal in Isthmian League Cup, 3 appearances in Isthmian League Full Members Cup, 1 appearance in FA Trophy, 1 appearance and 1 goal in Herts Charity Cup, 1 appearance in Herts Senior Cup, 1 appearance in East Anglian Cup)	2	39	9
St Albans City	1994–95	Isthmian League Premier Division	15	2	1	0	—		—		16 (Note: 3 appearances in Isthmian League Cup, 2 appearances in FA Trophy, 2 appearances and 1 goal in Herts Charity Cup, 2 appearances in Herts Senior Cup, 2 appearances and 1 goal in London Challenge Cup, 2 appearances and 1 goal in East Anglian Cup, 2 appearances and 1 goal in Eastern Floodlight Cup, 1 appearance in Isthmian League Full Members Cup)	4	32	6
St Albans City	1995–96	Isthmian League Premier Division	20	4	0	0	—		—		5 (Note: 2 appearances in FA Trophy, 2 appearances in East Anglian Cup, 1 appearance in Eastern Floodlight Cup)	0	25	4
St Albans City	Total		142	50	9	3	—		—		60	20	211	73
Career total			241	65	20	5	6	0	0	0	74	21	341	91

== Honours ==
St Albans City

- Herts Charity Cup: 1986–87

Individual

- St Albans City Player of the Year: 1987–88
