= Tony Obi =

English footballer (born 1965)

Personal information
- Full name: Anthony Lloyd Obi
- Date of birth: 15 September 1965 (age 61)
- Place of birth: Birmingham, England
- Height: 5 ft 5 in (1.65 m)
- Position: Forward

Youth career
- Harborne Boys
- 1981–1983: Aston Villa

Senior career*
Years	Team	Apps	(Gls)
1983–1985	Aston Villa	0	(0)
1984	→ Walsall (loan)	2	(0)
1985	→ Plymouth Argyle (loan)	5	(0)
1985	Bristol Rovers	1	(0)
1985–1987	Oxford United	1	(0)
1986	→ Brentford (loan)	10	(0)
1987–1993	K.V. Oostende		
1993–1994	K.S.V. Roeselare	30	(8)
1994–1995	K.V. Oostende	1	(0)
1995–1996	F.C. Roeselare		
1996–1997	K.S.V. Diksmuide		
1997–1998	K.S.K. Wevelgem City	27	(8)
- K.E. Gistel

International career
0	England Youth	0	(0)
- * Club domestic league appearances and goals

Anthony Lloyd Obi (born 15 September 1965) is an English retired professional footballer who played as a forward in the Football League for Brentford, Plymouth Argyle, Walsall, Bristol Rovers and Oxford United. He spent the majority of his career in Belgium, most notably with K.V. Oostende, for whom he made 174 appearances in the top three divisions of Belgian football. He later became a youth coach with K.V. Oostende and still held the role as of August 2021.

== Personal life ==
Obi's son Matthieu Hubrouck also became a footballer. As of 2018, Obi had been running the 't Valentientje bar in Ostend for 23 years. The business was declared bankrupt in May 2019. As of August 2018, he was running Obi's Bar at K.V. Oostende's Versluys Arena.

== Career statistics ==
Appearances and goals by club, season and competition
Club	Season	League			National Cup		League Cup		Total	
Club	Season	Division	Apps	Goals	Apps	Goals	Apps	Goals	Apps	Goals
Plymouth Argyle (loan)	1984–85	Third Division	5	0	—		—		5	0
Bristol Rovers	1985–86	Third Division	1	0	—		—		1	0
Oxford United	1986–87	First Division	1	0	0	0	0	0	1	0
Brentford (loan)	1986–87	Third Division	10	0	—		—		10	0
K.V. Oostende	1994–95	Belgian First Division	1	0	0	0	—		1	0
Career total			18	0	0	0	0	0	18	0
