= Mighty Penguins =

British sports documentary film

- Directed by: Louis Myles; Ahmed Twaij
- Produced by: Louis Myles; Ahmed Twaij
- Starring: Allan Cockram
- Cinematography: Steve Middleditch; Will Billany
- Edited by: Steve Williams
- Production companies: Fever Media; Meadowlark Media; Firelight Media Inc; It Was All a Dream Productions
- Release date: 10 June 2023 (Tribeca)
- Running time: 33 minutes
- Country: United Kingdom
- Language: English

Mighty Penguins is a 2023 sports documentary film about an amateur football team Brentford Penguins, consisting of players with Down's Syndrome, established by former Brentford player Allan Cockram in London, in 2017. The film premiered at the Tribeca Festival in 2023.

== Cast ==
- Allan Cockram
- Special K
- Peanut
- Captain Charlie

== Production ==
The film is part of a wider series called Sports Explains the World, executive produced by John Skipper for Meadowlark Media.

Allan Cockram, who founded the Brentford Penguins in 2017, told Talksport that he received a phone call from producer/director Louis Myles which he thought “was a wind-up at first” about making a documentary about the club and the players. It was co-produced and co-directed by Ahmed Twaij, and produced by All a Dream Productions and Firelight Media.

== Release ==
The film had its premiere at the Tribeca Film Festival in June 2023.

== Reception ==
Donald McRae in The Guardian described the film as directed “with a light touch” by Louis Myles and Ahmed Twaij. At a BFI Southbank screening Mark Kermode described the film as “utterly remarkable and utterly life-affirming”.

Following the release of the film, former footballer David Beckham, and his son Romeo, met the Mighty Penguins team in September 2023, and presented Cockram with an Who Cares Wins Unsung Hero Award from The Sun newspaper.
