= Warren Gravette =

English footballer

Personal information
- Full name: Warren Gravette
- Date of birth: 13 September 1968 (age 58)
- Place of birth: Thetford, England
- Positions: Forward; right back

Youth career
- 1979–1986: Tottenham Hotspur

Senior career*
Years	Team	Apps	(Gls)
1986–1987	Tottenham Hotspur	0	(0)
1987–1988	Brentford	5	(0)
–1990	Hemel Hempstead Town		
1990	Stevenage Borough	7	(1)
1990	St Albans City	2	(0)
- Finchley
- Hounslow
1996–1997	Romford	23	(2)
1997-1999	Ware	55	(4)
- Maidenhead United
- Harrow Borough
2014	Maidonians	5	(0)
- * Club domestic league appearances and goals

Warren Gravette (born 13 September 1968) is an English retired professional footballer who played as a forward and right back in the Football League for Brentford. He went on to have a long career in non-League football.

== Personal life ==
In September 1995, Gravette was sentenced to two years in prison for cash card fraud. In November 2015, he was sentenced to 10 years in prison for dealing cocaine.

== Career statistics ==
Appearances and goals by club, season and competition
Club	Season	League			FA Cup		League Cup		Other		Total	
Club	Season	Division	Apps	Goals	Apps	Goals	Apps	Goals	Apps	Goals	Apps	Goals
Brentford	1987–88	Third Division	5	0	0	0	0	0	0	0	5	0
Stevenage Borough	1989–90	Isthmian League Second Division North	7	1	—		—		—		7	1
St Albans City	1990–91	Isthmian League Premier Division	2	0	—		—		1 (Note: 1 appearance in Isthmian League Full Members Cup)	0	3	0
Career total			14	1	0	0	0	0	1	0	15	1
