= Charlie Williamson (footballer, born 1962) =

English footballer

Personal information
- Full name: Charles Harold Williamson
- Date of birth: 16 March 1962 (age 64)
- Place of birth: Sheffield, England
- Height: 5 ft 10 in (1.78 m)
- Position: Left back

Youth career
- –1979: Sheffield Wednesday

Senior career*
Years	Team	Apps	(Gls)
1979–1985	Sheffield Wednesday	62	(1)
1984	→ Lincoln City (loan)	5	(0)
1985	→ Southend United (loan)	10	(0)
1985–1987	Chesterfield	55	(2)
- Stafford Rangers
- * Club domestic league appearances and goals

Charles Harold Williamson (born 16 March 1962) is an English retired professional footballer who played as a left back in the Football League for Sheffield Wednesday, Chesterfield, Southend United and Lincoln City. After retiring as a player, he undertook work as a coach, scout and served as Head of Recruitment at Chesterfield between June and December 2019.

== Career statistics ==
Appearances and goals by club, season and competition
Club	Season	League			FA Cup		League Cup		Other		Total	
Club	Season	Division	Apps	Goals	Apps	Goals	Apps	Goals	Apps	Goals	Apps	Goals
Sheffield Wednesday	1979–80	Third Division	3	0	0	0	0	0	—		3	0
Sheffield Wednesday	1980–81	Second Division	8	0	0	0	1	0	—		9	0
Sheffield Wednesday	1981–82	Second Division	32	1	1	0	2	0	—		35	0
Sheffield Wednesday	1982–83	Second Division	9	0	0	0	0	0	—		9	0
Sheffield Wednesday	1983–84	Second Division	10	0	0	0	1	0	—		11	0
Sheffield Wednesday	Total		62	1	1	0	4	0	—		67	0
Lincoln City (loan)	1983–84	Third Division	5	0	1	0	—		—		6	0
Southend United (loan)	1984–85	Fourth Division	10	0	—		—		—		10	0
Chesterfield	1985–86	Third Division	27	1	2	0	0	0	2 (Note: Appearances in Football League Trophy)	0	31	1
Chesterfield	1986–87	Third Division	28	1	1	0	1	0	1	0	31	1
Chesterfield	Total		55	2	3	0	1	0	3	0	62	2
Career total			132	3	5	0	5	0	3	0	145	3
