= Paul Birch (footballer, born 1968) =

English footballer (born 1968)

Personal information
- Full name: Paul Anthony Birch
- Date of birth: 3 December 1968 (age 57)
- Place of birth: Reading, England
- Height: 6 ft 0 in (1.83 m)
- Position: Forward

Youth career
- –1986: Arsenal
- 1986–1987: Portsmouth

Senior career*
Years	Team	Apps	(Gls)
1987–1988	Brentford	18	(2)
- Rothwell Town
- * Club domestic league appearances and goals

Paul Anthony Birch (born 3 December 1968) is an English retired professional footballer who played in the Football League for Brentford as a forward. He quit League football in October 1988 to become an estate agent.

== Career statistics ==
Appearances and goals by club, season and competition
Club	Season	League			FA Cup		League Cup		Other		Total	
Club	Season	Division	Apps	Goals	Apps	Goals	Apps	Goals	Apps	Goals	Apps	Goals
Brentford	1987–88	Third Division	16	2	0	0	0	0	1 (Note: Appearance in Football League Trophy)	0	17	2
Brentford	1988–89	Third Division	2	0	—		1	0	—		3	0
Career total			18	2	0	0	1	0	1	0	20	2
