= Paul Smith (footballer, born 1967) =

English footballer

Personal information
- Full name: Paul Stepney Smith
- Date of birth: 5 October 1967 (age 59)
- Place of birth: Wembley, England
- Height: 5 ft 8 in (1.73 m)
- Position: Right winger

Youth career
- 1982–1985: Arsenal

Senior career*
Years	Team	Apps	(Gls)
1985–1987	Arsenal	0	(0)
1987–1988	Brentford	17	(1)
1988–1989	Bristol Rovers	16	(1)
1989–1992	Torquay United	75	(12)
- * Club domestic league appearances and goals

Paul Stepney Smith (born 5 October 1967) is an English retired professional footballer who made over 100 appearances in the Football League for Torquay United, Brentford and Bristol Rovers as a right winger. His career was ended prematurely by injury.

== Career statistics ==
Appearances and goals by club, season and competition
Club	Season	League			FA Cup		League Cup		Other		Total	
Club	Season	Division	Apps	Goals	Apps	Goals	Apps	Goals	Apps	Goals	Apps	Goals
Brentford	1987–88	Third Division	17	1	0	0	0	0	2 (Note: Appearances in Football League Trophy)	0	19	0
Career total			17	1	0	0	0	0	2	0	19	0

== Honours ==
Torquay United

- Associate Members' Cup runner-up: 1988–89
