= Matthew Howard (footballer) =

English footballer

Personal information
- Full name: Matthew James Howard
- Date of birth: 5 December 1970 (age 55)
- Place of birth: Watford, England
- Height: 5 ft 11 in (1.80 m)
- Position: Right back

Youth career
- –1987: Watford
- 1987–1988: Brentford

Senior career*
Years	Team	Apps	(Gls)
1988–1989	Brentford	1	(0)
1989–1990	→ St Albans City (loan)		
1990–1991	St Albans City	59	(1)
1991–1992	Boreham Wood		
1993	St Albans City	0	(0)
1995	Hayes	10	(0)
1995–1996	St Albans City	20	(0)
1996	Boreham Wood		
1996–1997	Chesham United		
1997–2000	Hendon	86	(2)
2000–2001	Boreham Wood		
2001–2006	Elliott Star		
- * Club domestic league appearances and goals

Matthew James Howard (born 5 December 1970) is an English retired professional footballer who made one appearance in the Football League for Brentford as a right back. After his release in 1989, he dropped into non-League football and made over 100 appearances with both Boreham Wood and Hendon.

== Playing career ==
=== Brentford ===
After beginning his career in the youth system at hometown club Watford, Driscoll joined the youth team at Third Division club Brentford in 1987. He made his professional debut on the final day of the 1987–88 season, when he came on as a half time substitute for Roger Stanislaus in a 2–1 defeat to York City at Griffin Park. He received a yellow card, as manager Steve Perryman had forgotten to inform the referee of the change. Howard failed to make a first team appearance during the 1988–89 season, but was a part of the youth team which reached the semi-finals of the 1988–89 FA Youth Cup. Howard departed Brentford in January 1990, having made just a single first team appearance.

=== Non-League ===
After his release from Brentford, Howard had a long career in non-League football, playing for Isthmian League clubs St Albans City, Boreham Wood, Hayes, Chesham United, Hendon, Leyton, Hitchin Town, Leighton Town and Aylesbury United. He finished his career with Hertfordshire Senior County League Premier Division club Elliott Star, for whom he made 24 appearances in his final two seasons.

== Career statistics ==
Appearances and goals by club, season and competition
Club	Season	League			FA Cup		League Cup		Other		Total	
Club	Season	Division	Apps	Goals	Apps	Goals	Apps	Goals	Apps	Goals	Apps	Goals
Brentford	1987–88	Third Division	1	0	0	0	0	0	0	0	1	0
St Albans City	1989–90	Isthmian League Premier Division	40	0	1	0	—		12 (Note: 6 appearances in Isthmian League Cup, 4 appearances in Herts Senior Cup, 1 appearance in FA Trophy, 1 appearance in Isthmian League Full Members Cup)	0	53	0
St Albans City	1990–91	Isthmian League Premier Division	29	1	1	0	—		7 (Note: 2 appearances in Herts Senior Cup, 1 appearance in FA Trophy, 1 appearance in Isthmian League Cup, 1 appearance in Isthmian League Full Members Cup, 1 appearance in Herts Charity Cup, 1 appearance in Billy Minter Trophy)	0	37	1
St Albans City	Total		59	1	2	0	—		19	0	90	1
St Albans City	1993–94	Isthmian League Premier Division	0	0	0	0	—		1 (Note: 1 appearance in East Anglian Cup)	0	1	0
St Albans City	1995–96	Isthmian League Premier Division	20	0	0	0	—		8 (Note: 4 appearances in East Anglian Cup, 2 appearances and 1 goal in Isthmian League Full Members Cup, 1 appearance in Herts Charity Cup, 1 appearance in Eastern Floodlight Cup)	1	28	1
St Albans City	Total		79	1	2	0	—		28	1	109	1
Hendon	1997–98	Isthmian League Premier Division	32	2	4	0	—		14 (Note: 6 appearances in Isthmian League Full Members Cup, 2 appearances and 2 goals in Isthmian League Cup, 2 appearances in FA Trophy, 2 appearances in London Challenge Cup, 2 appearances in Middlesex Senior Cup)	2	50	4
Hendon	1998–99	Isthmian League Premier Division	31	0	6	0	—		14 (Note: 5 appearances and 1 goal in FA Trophy, 4 appearances in Middlesex Senior Cup, 2 appearances in Isthmian League Cup, 2 appearances in Isthmian League Full Members Cup, 1 appearance in London Challenge Cup)	1	51	1
Hendon	1999–00	Isthmian League Premier Division	23	0	0	0	—		6 (Note: 3 appearances and 1 goal in Middlesex Senior Cup, 1 appearance in FA Trophy, 1 appearance in Isthmian League Cup, 1 appearance in Isthmian League Full Members Cup)	1	29	1
Hendon	Total		86	2	10	0	—		34	4	130	6
Elliott Star	2004–05	Hertfordshire Senior County League Premier Division	11	0	0	0	—		0	0	11	0
Elliott Star	2005–06	Hertfordshire Senior County League Premier Division	11	0	0	0	—		2 (Note: 1 appearance in Herts Centenary Senior Trophy, 1 appearance in Aubrey Cup)	0	13	0
Elliott Star	Total		22	0	0	0	—		2	0	24	0
Career total			188	3	12	0	0	0	64	5	264	8

== Honours ==
Hendon

- Isthmian League Full Members Cup: 1997–98
