= Henry Hughton =

British/Irish footballer

Personal information
- Full name: Henry Timothy Hughton
- Date of birth: 18 November 1959 (age 66)
- Place of birth: Stratford, London, England
- Height: 5 ft 8 in (1.73 m)
- Position: Defender

Youth career
- –: Leyton Orient

Senior career*
Years	Team	Apps	(Gls)
1978–1982	Leyton Orient	111	(2)
1982–1986	Crystal Palace	118	(1)
1986	Brentford	8	(0)
1986–1988	Leyton Orient	18	(0)
1988–1990	Enfield	11	(0)
Total		266	(3)

International career
1981	Republic of Ireland U21	1	(0)
- * Club domestic league appearances and goals

Henry Timothy Hughton (born 18 November 1959) is a former professional footballer who played as a defender. Born in England, he represented Ireland at under-21 level.

== Career ==
=== Club career ===
Hughton was born in Stratford, London. He played in the Football League for Leyton Orient, Crystal Palace and Brentford. He later played non-league football for Enfield.

=== International career ===
Hughton made one appearance for the Republic of Ireland under-21 team, against England in 1981.

== Family ==
Hughton was born in England to an Irish mother and a Ghanaian father. He is the younger brother of Ireland international footballer Chris Hughton and uncle to Chris's son Cian Hughton, who also played League football.
