= Sean Priddle =

English footballer

Personal information
- Full name: Sean Patrick Priddle
- Date of birth: 14 December 1965 (age 60)
- Place of birth: Hammersmith, England
- Position: Midfielder

Youth career
- 1982–1984: Wimbledon

Senior career*
Years	Team	Apps	(Gls)
1984–1986	Wimbledon	0	(0)
1984	→ Napier City Rovers (loan)		(5)
1985	→ Crewe Alexandra (loan)	11	(0)
1985	→ Grebbestads IF (loan)		
1985–1986	→ Tooting & Mitcham United (loan)	13	(0)
1986–1987	Exeter City	18	(1)
1987	Brentford	6	(0)
1987–1988	Weymouth		
1988–1989	St Albans City	51	(6)
- Sutton United
1992–1994	Carshalton Athletic		
- Harrow Borough
- Southall
- * Club domestic league appearances and goals

Sean Patrick Priddle (born 14 December 1965) is an English retired professional football midfielder who played in the Football League for Exeter City, Crewe Alexandra and Brentford.

== Career statistics ==
Appearances and goals by club, season and competition
Club	Season	League			FA Cup		League Cup		Other		Total	
Club	Season	Division	Apps	Goals	Apps	Goals	Apps	Goals	Apps	Goals	Apps	Goals
Crewe Alexandra (loan)	1984–85	Fourth Division	11	0	—		—		—		11	0
Brentford	1987–88	Third Division	6	0	0	0	0	0	0	0	6	0
St Albans City	1987–88	Isthmian League Premier Division	9	0	—		—		—		9	0
St Albans City	1988–89	Isthmian League Premier Division	42	6	3	0	—		9 (Note: 3 appearances in Herts Charity Cup, 2 appearances in FA Trophy, 2 appearances in Isthmian League Cup, 1 appearance in Premier Inter-League Cup, 1 appearance in Herts Senior Cup)	0	54	6
St Albans City	Total		51	6	3	0	—		9	0	63	6
Career total			68	6	3	0	0	0	9	0	80	6
