= Robbie Carroll =

English footballer and coach

Personal information
- Full name: Robert Carroll
- Date of birth: 15 February 1968 (age 58)
- Place of birth: Greenford, England
- Positions: Right winger; forward

Youth career
- –1986: Southampton

Senior career*
Years	Team	Apps	(Gls)
1986	Gosport Borough		
1986–1988	Brentford	34	(8)
1988–1989	Fareham Town	50	
1989–1992	Yeovil Town	105	(26)
1992–1993	Woking	16	(2)
1993–1994	Crawley Town	10	(3)
1994–1996	Salisbury City	57	(13)
1996–1997	Basingstoke Town	36	(10)
- Worthing
- Bashley

Managerial career
- 2020–2023: Romsey Town Development Squad
- * Club domestic league appearances and goals

Robert Carroll (born 15 February 1968) is an English retired professional footballer who played as a right winger in the Football League for Brentford. He later embarked on a long career in non-League football, making 140 appearances for Yeovil Town.

== Playing career ==
=== Early years ===
A winger, Carroll began his career in the youth system at Southampton, but failed to make a first team appearance. He dropped into non-League football to sign for Southern League Premier Division club Gosport Borough in 1986.

=== Brentford ===
Carroll made a move into League football to return home to London and join Third Division club Brentford on non-contract terms in September 1986. He made 26 appearances and scored five goals during the 1986–87 season and signed a permanent contract. Carroll was out of favour during the 1987–88 season, though he managed to score five goals in 16 appearances up front. He rejected a monthly contract and departed at the end of the campaign, having made 42 appearances and scored 10 goals during less than two years at Griffin Park.

=== Return to non-League football ===
After his release from Brentford, Carroll dropped back into non-League football, joining Southern League Premier Division club Fareham Town, for whom he made 50 appearances and scored 12 goals. He made the move up to the Conference to join Yeovil Town in 1989 and scored 43 goals in 140 appearances during a three-year spell at Huish Park. He moved to Conference rivals Woking in 1992 and failed to make an impression before further spells in the Isthmian and Southern Leagues with Crawley Town, Salisbury City, Basingstoke Town, Worthing and Bashley.

== Coaching career ==
As of 2015, Carroll was first team coach at Wessex League Premier Division club Christchurch. As of 2018, he was working as Football Development Officer at Fareham Town. In April 2020, Carroll was appointed as manager of the Romsey Town Development Squad.

== Career statistics ==
Appearances and goals by club, season and competition
Club	Season	League			FA Cup		League Cup		Other		Total	
Club	Season	Division	Apps	Goals	Apps	Goals	Apps	Goals	Apps	Goals	Apps	Goals
Brentford	1986–87	Third Division	22	4	1	0	0	0	2 (Note: Appearance(s) in Football League Trophy)	1	26	5
Brentford	1987–88	Third Division	12	4	1	0	2	1	1	0	16	5
Brentford	Total		34	8	2	0	2	1	3	1	42	10
Yeovil Town	1989–90	Conference	37	11	1	1	—		11 (Note: 6 appearances in Conference League Cup, 4 appearances in FA Trophy, 1 appearance in Somerset Premier Cup)	4	49	16
Yeovil Town	1990–91	Conference	36	9	2	0	—		5 (Note: 3 appearances in Somerset Premier Cup, 1 appearance in FA Trophy, 1 appearance in Conference League Cup)	4	43	13
Yeovil Town	1991–92	Conference	33	6	3	0	—		12 (Note: 5 appearances in Conference League Cup, 4 appearances in Somerset Premier Cup, 3 appearances in FA Trophy)	8	48	14
Yeovil Town	Total		106	26	6	1	—		28	16	140	43
Crawley Town	1993–94	Southern League Premier Division	10	3	—		—		1 (Note: Appearance in Sussex Senior Challenge Cup)	1	11	4
Basingstoke Town	1997–98	Isthmian League Premier Division	4	0	2	1	—		—		6	1
Career total			154	37	10	2	2	1	32	18	199	58

== Honours ==
Basingstoke Town

- Hampshire Senior Cup: 1996–97
