= Sean Sparham =

English footballer

Personal information
- Full name: Sean Ricky Sparham
- Date of birth: 4 December 1968 (age 57)
- Place of birth: Bexley, England
- Position: Left back

Youth career
- –1987: Millwall

Senior career*
| Years | Team | Apps | (Gls) |
| 1987–1989 | Millwall | 28 | (0) |
| 1990 | → Brentford (loan) | 5 | (1) |
- Erith & Belvedere
| Total | | 32 | (1) |
- * Club domestic league appearances and goals

Sean Ricky Sparham (born 4 December 1968 in Bexley, Greater London) is an English former professional footballer who played in the Football League as a defender for Millwall and Brentford.

== Personal life ==
Since leaving football, Sparham has worked as a freelance photographer and picture editor and as of February 2020 he was working as a painter and decorator in Sidcup.

== Honours ==
Millwall

- Football League Second Division: 1987–88

== Career statistics ==
Appearances and goals by club, season and competition
| Club | Season | League | | | FA Cup | | League Cup | | Other | | Total | |
| Club | Season | Division | Apps | Goals | Apps | Goals | Apps | Goals | Apps | Goals | Apps | Goals |
|---|---|---|---|---|---|---|---|---|---|---|---|---|
| Millwall | 1986–87 | Second Division | 0 | 0 | 0 | 0 | 0 | 0 | 0 | 0 | 0 | 0 |
| Millwall | 1987–88 | Second Division | 7 | 0 | 0 | 0 | 2 | 0 | 0 | 0 | 9 | 0 |
| Millwall | 1988–89 | First Division | 12 | 0 | 0 | 0 | 1 | 0 | 1 (Note: Appearance in Full Members Cup) | 0 | 14 | 0 |
| Millwall | 1989–90 | First Division | 9 | 0 | 1 | 0 | 0 | 0 | 0 | 0 | 10 | 0 |
| Millwall | Total | | 28 | 0 | 1 | 0 | 3 | 0 | 1 | 0 | 32 | 0 |
| Brentford (loan) | 1989–90 | Third Division | 5 | 1 | — | | — | | — | | 5 | 1 |
| Career total | | | 33 | 1 | 1 | 0 | 3 | 0 | 1 | 0 | 37 | 1 |
