= Steve Thorne =

English footballer

Personal information
- Full name: Steven Terence Thorne
- Date of birth: 15 September 1968 (age 58)
- Place of birth: Hampstead, England
- Height: 5 ft 10 in (1.78 m)
- Position: Midfielder

Youth career
- Arsenal
- –1986: Watford

Senior career*
Years	Team	Apps	(Gls)
1986–1987	Watford	0	(0)
1987	Brentford	1	(1)
- Maidenhead United
- * Club domestic league appearances and goals

Steven Terence Thorne (born 15 September 1968) is an English retired professional footballer who played as a midfielder in the Football League for Brentford. Despite making just two appearances, his surname served as the inspiration for the name of the long-running Brentford fanzine Thorne In The Side.

== Career statistics ==
Appearances and goals by club, season and competition
Club	Season	League			FA Cup		League Cup		Other		Total	
Club	Season	Division	Apps	Goals	Apps	Goals	Apps	Goals	Apps	Goals	Apps	Goals
Brentford	1987–88	Third Division	1	1	1	0	0	0	0	0	2	1
Career total			1	1	1	0	0	0	0	0	2	1
