= Micky Droy =

English footballer and manager

Personal information
- Full name: Michael Robert Droy
- Date of birth: 7 May 1951 (age 75)
- Place of birth: Highbury, London, England
- Position: Central defender

Youth career
- Arsenal
- Hoddesdon Town

Senior career*
Years	Team	Apps	(Gls)
1970	Slough Town	15	(1)
1970–1985	Chelsea	272	(13)
1984	→ Luton Town (loan)	2	(0)
1985–1986	Crystal Palace	49	(7)
1986–1987	Brentford	19	(3)
1987–1988	Dulwich Hamlet	2	(0)
1988–1991	Kingstonian	98	(12)
Total		457	(36)

Managerial career
- 1994–1995: Kingstonian
- * Club domestic league appearances and goals

Micky Droy (born 7 May 1951 in Highbury, London) is an English former footballer who played in the Football League during the 1970s and 1980s, spending 15 years with Chelsea but also playing for Luton Town, Crystal Palace and Brentford.

== Playing career ==
Droy was a tall and generally uncompromising defender. He played for Chelsea during a particularly turbulent period of the club's history, and was a part of the sides which were relegated to the Second Division in 1974–75, promoted back to the First Division in 1976–77, relegated again in 1978–79 and then promoted again in 1983–84. A feature on The Times' website summed him up as "six feet four inches of hard-core centre back, who had an unsentimental way with a headed clearance and who, from 1971, gave 15 years of no-nonsense service to a mortifyingly declining side." He was Chelsea's Player of the Year in 1978.

After a brief loan spell with Luton Town, Droy left Chelsea in March 1985, joined Crystal Palace on a free transfer, then joined Brentford, before moving back to non-league football initially with Dulwich Hamlet and then for several years with Kingstonian, where he was appointed assistant manager in September 1994, before being appointed manager later in the month. Droy was removed from his post on 7 January 1995. Droy later played for Chelmsford Sunday League club Priory Sports under Garry Hill, alongside former internationals Alan Brazil and Paul Parker.

== Post-playing career ==
He ran a successful electrical business and moved to Florida.
