= Ware F.C. =

Association football club in England

Coordinates: 51°49′29″N 0°2′0″W

Ware
- Full name: Ware Football Club
- Nickname: The Blues
- Founded: 1892; 134 years ago (as Ware Town)
- Ground: Wodson Park
- Capacity: 3,300
- Chairman: İnanç Elitok
- Manager: Paul Halsey
- League: Southern League Division One Central
- 2025–26: Southern League Division One Central, 7th of 22
Home colours	Away colours

Ware F.C. is a football club established in 1892 and based at Wodson Park in Ware, Hertfordshire, England, currently members of the Southern League Division One Central.

== History ==
The club was founded in 1892 and although first called Ware Town soon changed its name to plain Ware FC. The club has held senior status from its very beginning, entering the Herts Senior Cup for the first time in 1893, and winning the cup on the first of five occasions in 1899 with a 2–1 win over Hitchin at St Albans. By this time, Ware had been instrumental in founding the East Herts League and had won its championship on two of the three times it had been competed for. The club was to win it five more times before moving on to the North Middlesex League in 1907, and then also to the Herts County League in 1908. The championship of the latter came that season in a three-way play off against St Albans City and Welwyn.

After the First World War, the club gained a league and cup double with a second Herts County League Championship and a fourth Herts Senior Cup win in 1922. The scenes in Ware when the team returned with the Senior Cup tell us something about the hold that football had on local loyalties at the time. The local paper reported that "Large crowds awaited the return of the special train to Ware, everybody being in high spirits. The Cup was marched through the town in front of a cheering throng." Indeed, it was later recalled that the cup was taken through the town on subsequent nights and that stops were made outside public houses where it was charged with beer before being drained by the crowd.

Shortly after this, Ware joined the Spartan League in which they were to enjoy several successes, winning the Division 2(B) Championship in 1926, Division 1 in 1951 with the highest "goals for" total ever achieved by a club in the Spartan League, and the Premier Division in 1952. In these later years, the club also made significant progress in the old Amateur Cup meeting many famous sides on the way. One of these was Hendon, against whom Ware drew their largest attendance of 3,800 in the first round in January 1957.

Moving on to the Delphian League and then Athenian League, Ware enjoyed another successful period. Two promotions, two league cup wins and two reserve championships paved the way for progress in the FA Cup. In this, Ware reached the first round proper for the first time in 1968 when they travelled to the then Third Division side Luton Town. The opposition had a 100% home record but the game was scoreless with 30 minutes to go before a judicious substitution broke the stalemate and left Ware beaten 6–1 at the final whistle.

In these successful circumstances, it was not surprising that Ware pressed for entry to the expanding Isthmian League. This was achieved for season 1975–76 and they have maintained their place in the league ever since. This is thanks most recently to their Division 2 championship season of 2005–06 which carried them into Division 1 just before Division 2 was disbanded. Another FA Cup first round appearance in 2007 has added further distinction with a narrow home defeat against Kidderminster Harriers being watched by 2,123 people, a record for the current ground at Wodson Park.

Before that, a tenth Herts Senior Cup final in 2001 and another in 2008 have emphasised the club's long history and continuity. Ware is the first of only three possible candidates to appear in this final in three separate centuries.

Ahead of the 2015–16 season, following Clevedon Town's demotion from the Southern Football League, Ware were transferred from the Isthmian League Division One North to the Southern League Division One Central but following further reorganisation by the FA Leagues Committee, 2016–17 saw them return to the Isthmian League.

Following the addition of a further division at Step 4 level of the National League System and the consequent reallocation of clubs, Ware returned to the Southern League ahead of season 2021/2.

== Honours ==
- Isthmian League
  - Division Two champions 2005–06
- Spartan League
  - Premier Division champions 1952–53
  - Division One champions 1951–52
  - Division Two (B) champions 1926–27
- Herts County League
  - Champions 1908–09, 1921–22
- East Herts League
  - Champions 1897–98, 1898–99, 1899–1900, 1902–03, 1903–04, 1905–06 (shared), 1906–07
- Herts Senior Cup
  - Winners 1898–99, 1903–04, 1906–07, 1921–22, 1953–54
- Herts Charity Shield
  - Winners 1926–27, 1952–53, 1956–57, 1958–59, 1962–63, 1985–86
- East Anglian Cup
  - Winners 1973–74

== Records ==
- FA Cup best performance: first round proper – 1968–69, 2007–08
- FA Amateur Cup best performance: second round proper – 1953–54, 1954–55
- FA Trophy best performance: third qualifying round – 1979–80
- FA Vase best performance: fourth round – 2002–03
- FA Youth Cup best performance: second round proper – 2019–20
- Record attendance: 3,800 vs Hendon, FA Amateur Cup, January 1957
- Biggest victory: 14-0 vs Broxbourne, 18th January 1896
- Heaviest defeat: 0–11 vs Barnet
- Most appearances: Gary Riddle, 654

== Former players ==
1. Players that have played/managed in the Football League or any foreign equivalent to this level (i.e. fully professional league).
2. Players with full international caps.
Ralph Coates (Eng)

3. Players that hold a club record or have captained the club.

- (England) Warren Gravette
- (Sri Lanka) Marvin Hamilton
- (Jamaica) Micah Hyde
- (Northern Ireland) Ryan Maxwell
- (England) Scott Neilson
- (England) Derek Saunders
- (England) Richard Bryan
- (Afghanistan) Taufee Skandari
- (England) paul Holloway

== Sources ==
- Ware at the Football Club History Database
- An Intention to Play – The History of Ware Football Club 1892–1992
