= John Power (footballer) =

English footballer

Personal information
- Full name: John Power
- Date of birth: 10 December 1959 (age 66)
- Place of birth: Chelsea, England
- Position: Goalkeeper

Senior career*
Years	Team	Apps	(Gls)
- Kingstonian
1987	→ Brentford (loan)	2	(0)
- * Club domestic league appearances and goals

John Power (born 10 December 1959) is an English retired professional football goalkeeper who made two appearances in the Football League for Brentford, on loan from Kingstonian.

== Career statistics ==
Appearances and goals by club, season and competition
Club	Season	League			Total	
Club	Season	Division	Apps	Goals	Apps	Goals
Brentford (loan)	1986–87	Third Division	2	0	2	0
Career total			2	0	2	0
