= Tony Oliver (footballer) =

English footballer

Personal information
- Full name: Anthony John Oliver
- Date of birth: 22 September 1967 (age 59)
- Place of birth: Portsmouth, England
- Position: Goalkeeper

Youth career
- 1984–1986: Portsmouth

Senior career*
| Years | Team | Apps | (Gls) |
| 1986–1987 | Portsmouth | 0 | (0) |
| | → Bristol Rovers (loan) | 0 | (0) |
| 1987–1988 | Brentford | 11 | (0) |
| 1988–1991 | Weymouth | | |
- Dorchester Town
- * Club domestic league appearances and goals

Anthony John Oliver (born 22 September 1967) is an English retired professional footballer who played as a goalkeeper in the Football League with Brentford. He played non-League football for Weymouth and Dorchester Town and later became a goalkeeping coach at the latter club.

== Career statistics ==
Appearances and goals by club, season and competition
| Club | Season | League | | | FA Cup | | League Cup | | Other | | Total | |
| Club | Season | Division | Apps | Goals | Apps | Goals | Apps | Goals | Apps | Goals | Apps | Goals |
|---|---|---|---|---|---|---|---|---|---|---|---|---|
| Brentford | 1987–88 | Third Division | 11 | 0 | 0 | 0 | 0 | 0 | 0 | 0 | 11 | 0 |
| Career total | | | 11 | 0 | 0 | 0 | 0 | 0 | 0 | 0 | 11 | 0 |
