= Colin Scott (footballer) =

Scottish footballer

Personal information
- Full name: Colin George Scott
- Date of birth: 19 May 1970 (age 56)
- Place of birth: Glasgow, Scotland
- Height: 1.88 m (6 ft 2 in)
- Position: Goalkeeper

Youth career
- Dalry Thistle
- 1986–1989: Rangers

Senior career*
Years	Team	Apps	(Gls)
1989–1996	Rangers	13	(0)
1990	→ Brentford (loan)	6	(0)
1991	→ Airdrieonians(loan)	1	(0)
1996	Hamilton Academical	5	(0)
1996–1998	Raith Rovers	6	(0)
1998–2000	Clydebank	49	(0)
2000–2007	Queen of the South	115	(0)
2007	Gretna	0	(0)
Total		195	(0)
- * Club domestic league appearances and goals

Colin George Scott (born 19 May 1970 in Glasgow) is a retired Scottish footballer, who played as a goalkeeper.

== Career ==
He joined Rangers from junior side Dalry Thistle in 1986 and mainly spent his time as a backup to Andy Goram. Whilst at Rangers he had loan spells at Brentford and Airdrieonians. He made a total of 13 appearances for Rangers and joined Hamilton Academical in 1996. Then he had spells at Raith Rovers and Clydebank.

Scott next joined the club where he stayed longest and played his most first team games, Dumfries club Queen of the South, in October 2000. Scott made a vital penalty save against Hamilton Accies in the run in to Queens' 2001–02 Second Division championship.

In season 2003–04 Scott suffered probably his worst injury in his time at Queen of the South whilst playing against Clyde at Broadwood Stadium in late November. Whilst collecting a high ball, he collided with a Clyde player and severely dislocated his shoulder. Ex-Queens manager John Connolly later described the injury as "a massive blow to his plans".

Due to unsuccessful surgery on his knee, Colin was advised to retire from football. Queen of the South rewarded his loyalty at the last game of season 2006–07 against Airdrie with a special presentation for all his efforts to the Doonhamers for six and a half years service. With Queens, he made a total of 134 appearances before retiring in March 2007. Had it not been for an injury-troubled time at Palmerston, it is likely he would have made many more appearances.

After an emergency call from Gretna, he came out of retirement and signed a short-term deal until January 2008. He was released on 31 December 2007 without making an appearance for the club.
