= Roger Stanislaus =

English footballer (born 1968)

Personal information
- Full name: Roger Edmund Philbert Stanislaus
- Date of birth: 2 November 1968 (age 57)
- Place of birth: Hammersmith, England
- Height: 5 ft 9 1/2 in (1.77 m)
- Position: Left back

Youth career
- –1986: Arsenal

Senior career*
Years	Team	Apps	(Gls)
1986–1987	Arsenal	0	(0)
1987–1990	Brentford	111	(4)
1990–1995	Bury	176	(5)
1995–1996	Leyton Orient	21	(0)
1997	Peterborough United	0	(0)
- * Club domestic league appearances and goals

Roger Edmund Philbert Stanislaus (born 2 November 1968) is an English former professional footballer who made over 300 appearances in the Football League for Bury, Brentford and Leyton Orient as a left back.

== Career ==
=== Arsenal ===
A left back, Stanislaus joined First Division club Arsenal as a schoolboy and began an apprenticeship in 1985. He progressed sufficiently to sign his first professional contract in July 1986, but was released at the end of the 1986–87 season, without having made a first team appearance.

=== Brentford ===
Stanislaus joined Third Division club Brentford on trial in September 1987 and impressed sufficiently to be awarded a permanent contract one month later. He quickly broke into the team and made 41 appearances and scored two goals during the 1987–88 season, which earned him a new two-year contract in April 1988. Stanislaus' "languid, yet hugely effective style" made him "a crowd favourite at left back". He had a memorable 1988–89 season, making a career-high 56 appearances and scoring two goals, one of which came with a 40-yard "screamer" in a 2–2 League Cup first round draw with Fulham early in the campaign. After a "not so impressive" 1989–90 season, Stanislaus elected to depart Griffin Park. He made 134 appearances and scored five goals during three seasons with the Bees.

=== Bury ===
During the 1990 off-season, Stanislaus joined Third Division club Bury for a £90,000 tribunal-fixed fee. He remained with the club for five seasons and made 216 appearances and scored seven goals. Stanislaus' performances during the 1993–94 season saw him named in the Third Division PFA Team of the Year.

=== Leyton Orient ===
On 11 July 1995, Stanislaus joined newly relegated Third Division club Leyton Orient for a £50,000 fee. He made 24 appearances before being banned from football for 12 months on 1 February 1996, for taking a performance-enhancing drug. He was sacked by Orient a matter of days later.

=== Peterborough United ===
Stanislaus made a brief return to football with Second Division strugglers Peterborough United in March 1997, but made just two reserve team appearances.

== Honours ==
- Third Division PFA Team of the Year: 1993–94

== Career statistics ==
Appearances and goals by club, season and competition
Club	Season	League			FA Cup		League Cup		Other		Total	
Club	Season	Division	Apps	Goals	Apps	Goals	Apps	Goals	Apps	Goals	Apps	Goals
Brentford	1987–88	Third Division	37	2	1	0	—		3 (Note: Appearances in Football League Trophy)	0	41	2
Brentford	1988–89	Third Division	43	1	6	0	4	1	2	0	56	2
Brentford	1989–90	Third Division	31	1	0	0	4	0	3	0	38	1
Brentford	Total		111	4	7	0	8	1	8	0	134	5
Bury	Total		176	5	10	1	9	1	21	0	216	7
Leyton Orient	1995–96	Third Division	21	0	1	0	1	0	1	0	24	0
Career total			308	9	18	1	18	2	30	0	374	12

== See also ==
- List of doping cases in sport
