= Wayne Turner (footballer) =

English footballer & manager (born 1961)

Personal information
- Full name: Wayne Leslie Turner
- Date of birth: 9 March 1961 (age 65)
- Place of birth: Luton, England
- Position: Midfielder

Youth career
- Lewsey Youth

Senior career*
Years	Team	Apps	(Gls)
1978–1985	Luton Town	84	(2)
1981	→ Lincoln City (loan)	18	(0)
1985–1986	Coventry City	15	(1)
1986–1988	Brentford	56	(2)
1988–1991	Barnet	43	(4)

Managerial career
- 2002–2003: Stevenage Borough
- * Club domestic league appearances and goals

Wayne Leslie Turner (born 9 March 1961) is an English former professional footballer, best known for his association as a player and coach for his hometown club Luton Town.

== Career ==
Born in Luton, Turner graduated from local team Lewsey Youth in 1978 to play for the town's senior team, Luton Town. After three seasons as a squad player, Turner was sent out on loan to Lincoln City, an experience that benefited him – on his return, he became a first-team regular for Luton.

After three years in the Luton midfield, Turner was sold to Coventry City, who in turn sold him to Brentford after only one season. After two years with Brentford, he dropped out of the Football League to play for Barnet.

== Coaching and management ==
Turner started his coaching career while still at Barnet. In 1992, he took the opportunity to return to Luton Town to become part of David Pleat's coaching staff. In 1995, Lennie Lawrence promoted him to the position of assistant manager. He quit this position after two years and was briefly unemployed before becoming the assistant manager of Wycombe Wanderers. In 1999, he joined Peterborough United and served there for three years until 2002.

He was appointed as manager of Football Conference side Stevenage Borough in February 2002, although his employment was terminated after less than a year. In 2003 Turner joined the scouting team of Leicester City and in 2006 he moved on to become a scout for Crystal Palace.

He returned to Luton in 2008, coaching the club's under-15 and under-16 teams, before being promoted to Head of Youth Football in July 2012. Turner left his position in May 2015.

== Managerial statistics ==
Competitive matches only.

Team	Nat	From	To	Record				
Team	Nat	From	To	P	W	D	L	Win %
Stevenage Borough	(England)	27 February 2002	1 February 2003	52	18	9	25	34.62
Total				52	18	9	25	34.62
