= 1983–84 Brentford F.C. season =

English football team season

Brentford
1983–84 season
- Chairman: Martin Lange
- Manager: Fred Callaghan (until 2 February 1984); Frank Blunstone (2–9 February 1984); Frank McLintock (from 9 February 1984)
- Stadium: Griffin Park
- Third Division: 20th
- FA Cup: Third round
- League Cup: Second round
- Football League Trophy: Second round
- Top goalscorer: League: Joseph (18); All: Joseph (24)
- Highest home attendance: 17,859
- Lowest home attendance: 2,301
- Average home league attendance: 4,735
Home (Aug–Dec) colours	Home (Dec–May) colours	Away colours

During the 1983–84 English football season, Brentford competed in the Football League Third Division. A season of transition ended with a narrow escape from relegation.

== Season summary ==
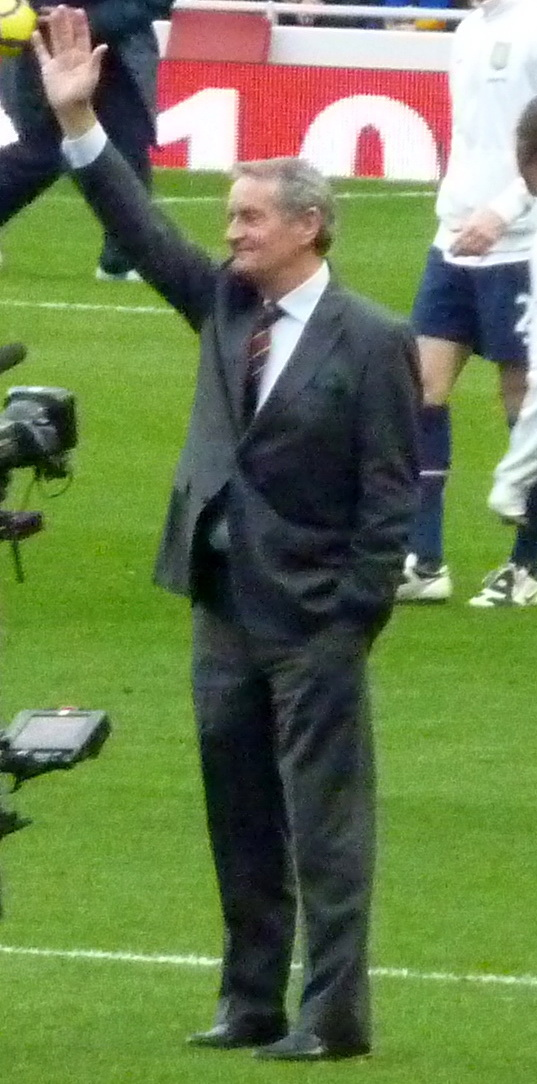
Frank McLintock took over as Brentford manager on 9 February 1984.

After two seasons in which, were it not for bad mid-season form, strong run-ins may have yielded a promotion challenge, Brentford manager Fred Callaghan kept his squad together. Save for the retirement of key midfielder Stan Bowles, Bowles' replacement Terry Bullivant was the only significant piece of transfer activity at Griffin Park during the 1983 off-season. Goalkeeper Trevor Swinburne arrived to provide competition for Paddy Roche. With forward Tony Mahoney still not fully fit after recovering from a broken leg, Bill Garner was brought in from non-League football on non-contract terms.

Brentford showed poor form between the beginning of the season and Christmas Eve 1983 (as of April 2026, the 4–3 defeat to Wimbledon was the final Football League match played on that date). Two wins and 10 defeats from the opening 19 Third Division matches left the club just above the foot of the table. In the midst of the barren run in the league, a two-legged tie with then-First Division champions Liverpool in the second round of the League Cup failed to produce much cheer, with the Bees suffering an 8–1 aggregate defeat. A reduction in size of Griffin Park in the intervening years meant that the 17,858 crowd which attended the first leg was not bettered prior to the club's final first team match at the ground in July 2020.

Player/assistant manager Ron Harris was replaced with former Brentford manager Frank Blunstone in October 1983 and Harris later remarked that it had been an acrimonious parting. An ever-increasing list of injuries and suspensions led manager Fred Callaghan to make a number of signings during the final two months of 1983, including new captain Ian Bolton for £2,000 and previously on-loan defender Paul Roberts from Millwall for a £10,000 fee. Stan Bowles came out of retirement to assist the team on a non-contract basis. The signings had an effect, with the Bees going four matches undefeated in late December 1983 and early January 1984 to rise out of the relegation places. Defeats in the following two matches led chairman Martin Lange to act and sack manager Fred Callaghan on 2 February. Lange paid tribute to Callaghan by stating that Callaghan could "leave the club proud in the knowledge that he leaves the club far better equipped than when he arrived".

Assistant Frank Blunstone took caretaker charge of the team for one match before the appointment of former Leicester City manager Frank McLintock on 9 February. McLintock installed former Brentford player John Docherty as his assistant. McLintock took over a club in 21st position with 20 matches to play and conducted an overhaul of the playing staff, selling central defender Alan Whitehead and bringing in right back Bobby Fisher and midfielder Tommy Finney from Cambridge United, plus Nigel Gray and Bill Roffey on loan. Attacker Bob Booker was recalled to the starting lineup, Ian Bolton and Tony Mahoney were dropped, Terry Bullivant and Graham Wilkins departed on loan and Stan Bowles retired for a second time.

A slight upturn in form meant that Brentford went into their final match of the season versus Walsall perched atop the relegation zone in 20th place and needing a victory, but a 1–1 draw was all that could be mustered. Circumstances transpired that 21st-place Scunthorpe United's 1–1 draw on the same day, in their penultimate match of the season, meant that the Iron needed to win their final match by a margin of seven goals to secure their safety. Brentford's Third Division status was retained when Scunthorpe United lost in their season finale on the following Tuesday night.

== League table ==
Pos	Team	Pld	W	D	L	GF	GA	GD	Pts	Promotion or relegation
18	Rotherham United	46	15	9	22	57	64	−7	54	
19	Plymouth Argyle	46	13	12	21	56	62	−6	51	
20	Brentford	46	11	16	19	69	79	−10	49	
21	Scunthorpe United (R)	46	9	19	18	54	73	−19	46	Relegation to the Fourth Division
22	Southend United (R)	46	10	14	22	55	76	−21	44	Relegation to the Fourth Division

(R) Relegated

== Results ==
Brentford's goal tally listed first.

=== Legend ===
Win	Draw	Loss

=== Pre-season and friendlies ===
Date	Opponent	Venue	Result	Attendance	Scorer(s)
3 August 1983	Kingstonian	A	6–0	n/a	Cassells (3), Joseph, Spencer, Greenaway
6 August 1983	Tottenham Hotspur	H	2–4	6,405	Hurlock (2)
8 August 1983	Staines Town	A	2–1	n/a	Hopson, Tully
9 August 1983	St Albans City	A	2–3	n/a	Hopson (2)
10 August 1983	West Ham United	H	2–0	3,104	G. Roberts, Joseph
11 August 1983	Walton & Hersham	A	7–2	n/a	Cassells (2), Greenaway (2), Lynch (2), Garner
13 August 1983	Aldershot	A	2–0	n/a	Garner, Cassells
15 August 1983	Hayes	A	0–6	n/a	
16 August 1983	Reading	A	2–5	n/a	Kamara, Joseph
20 August 1983	Bristol City	A	0–1	1,111	Smith
23 August 1983	Bracknell Town	A	0–0	n/a	
15 November 1983	Queens Park Rangers	H	3–2	1,414	Mahoney (2), Davies
14 May 1984	Chelsea	H	3–6	3,461	Cassells, McNichol, G. Roberts

=== Football League Third Division ===
No.	Date	Opponent	Venue	Result	Attendance	Scorer(s)
1	27 August 1983	Millwall	H	2–2	6,224	Joseph, Kamara
2	3 September 1983	Preston North End	A	3–3	3,957	Joseph, G. Roberts, Cassells
3	6 September 1983	Bristol Rovers	A	1–3	5,148	Joseph
4	10 September 1983	Lincoln City	H	3–0	4,777	Kamara, Joseph (2)
5	17 September 1983	Wigan Athletic	A	1–2	3,034	Garner
6	24 September 1983	Burnley	H	0–0	8,042	
7	1 October 1983	Gillingham	A	2–4	3,268	Kamara, McNichol
8	8 October 1983	Oxford United	A	1–2	7,326	Kamara
9	15 October 1983	Hull City	H	1–1	4,258	Joseph
10	18 October 1983	Port Vale	H	3–1	3,903	Bullivant, G. Roberts, McNichol
11	22 October 1983	Sheffield United	A	0–0	9,848	
12	29 October 1983	Bournemouth	H	1–1	4,630	Joseph
13	31 October 1983	Southend United	A	0–6	3,182	
14	5 November 1983	Plymouth Argyle	H	2–2	4,183	Mahoney, Cassells
15	12 November 1983	Orient	A	0–2	3,650	
16	26 November 1983	Bradford City	H	1–4	3,738	G. Roberts
17	3 December 1983	Bolton Wanderers	A	0–1	5,416	
18	17 December 1983	Walsall	A	0–1	3,965	
19	24 December 1983	Wimbledon	H	3–4	6,689	Kamara, McNichol, Hurlock
20	27 December 1983	Exeter City	A	2–1	4,303	Cassells, G. Roberts
21	31 December 1983	Newport County	H	2–1	4,631	Hurlock, G. Roberts
22	2 January 1984	Scunthorpe United	A	4–4	2,239	Mahoney, Cassells (pen), McNichol, Joseph
23	15 January 1984	Millwall	A	2–1	5,370	Joseph (2)
24	21 January 1984	Wigan Athletic	H	0–1	3,972	
25	1 February 1984	Lincoln City	A	0–2	2,266	
26	4 February 1984	Gillingham	H	2–3	4,317	Joseph, Bolton
27	11 February 1984	Burnley	A	2–2	7,027	Cassells, Kamara
28	14 February 1984	Southend United	H	0–0	3,961	
29	18 February 1984	Bournemouth	A	3–0	4,308	Cassells (3)
30	25 February 1984	Sheffield United	H	1–3	5,100	G. Roberts
31	3 March 1984	Port Vale	A	3–4	3,704	G. Roberts, Gray, Joseph
32	6 March 1984	Plymouth Argyle	A	1–1	4,322	Hurlock
33	10 March 1984	Orient	H	1–1	4,358	Joseph
34	17 March 1984	Oxford United	H	1–2	5,936	G. Roberts
35	20 March 1984	Rotherham United	H	2–1	3,391	Booker, Mahoney (pen)
36	24 March 1984	Hull City	A	0–2	5,572	
37	31 March 1984	Bristol Rovers	H	2–2	4,067	Booker, Hurlock
38	3 April 1984	Preston North End	H	4–1	3,446	Kamara, Finney, G. Roberts, Booker
39	7 April 1984	Rotherham United	A	0–4	3,705	
40	14 April 1984	Bolton Wanderers	H	3–0	3,831	Joseph, Deakin (og)
41	20 April 1984	Exeter City	H	3–0	5,620	Joseph, Booker, Finney
42	21 April 1984	Wimbledon	A	1–2	5,487	Joseph
43	28 April 1984	Bradford City	A	1–1	3,755	Cassells
44	5 May 1984	Scunthorpe United	H	3–0	4,561	Rowe, Joseph, Roffey
45	7 May 1984	Newport County	A	1–1	2,154	G. Roberts
46	12 May 1984	Walsall	H	1–1	5,281	Caswell (og)

=== FA Cup ===
Round	Date	Opponent	Venue	Result	Attendance	Scorer(s)
1R	19 November 1983	Dagenham	A	2–2	2,146	Joseph, P. Roberts
1R (replay)	22 November 1983	Dagenham	H	2–1	3,936	Mahoney, G. Roberts
2R	10 December 1983	Wimbledon	H	3–2	5,666	Kamara, G. Roberts, Joseph
3R	7 January 1984	Gillingham	A	3–5	6,509	G. Roberts, Hurlock, Cassells

=== Football League Cup ===
Round	Date	Opponent	Venue	Result	Attendance	Scorer(s)
1R (1st leg)	30 August 1983	Charlton Athletic	H	3–0	4,858	G. Roberts, Joseph, Berry (og)
1R (2nd leg)	13 September 1983	Charlton Athletic	A	1–2 (won 4–2 on aggregate)	3,622	
2R (1st leg)	5 October 1983	Liverpool	H	1–4	17,859	G. Roberts
2R (2nd leg)	25 October 1983	Liverpool	A	0–4 (lost 8–1 on aggregate)	9,092	

=== Football League Trophy ===
Round	Date	Opponent	Venue	Result	Attendance	Scorer(s)
SR1	21 February 1984	Orient	H	3–2	2,301	Finney, Joseph (2)
SR2	26 March 1983	Plymouth Argyle	A	0–2 (a.e.t.)	2,308	

- Sources: 100 Years of Brentford, The Big Brentford Book of the Eighties, Statto

== Playing squad ==
Players' ages are as of the opening day of the 1983–84 season.

Pos.	Name	Nat.	Date of birth (age)	Signed from	Signed in	Notes
Goalkeepers
GK	Paddy Roche	(Republic of Ireland)	4 January 1951 (aged 32)	Manchester United	1982	
GK	Trevor Swinburne	(England)	20 June 1953 (aged 30)	Carlisle United	1983	
Defenders
DF	Ian Bolton	(England)	13 July 1953 (aged 30)	Watford	1983	
DF	Bobby Fisher	(England)	3 August 1956 (aged 27)	Cambridge United	1984	
DF	Nigel Gray	(England)	2 November 1956 (aged 26)	Swindon Town	1984	On loan from Swindon Town
DF	Jim McNichol	(Scotland)	9 June 1958 (aged 25)	Luton Town	1978	
DF	Paul Roberts	(England)	27 April 1962 (aged 21)	Millwall	1983	Loaned from Millwall before transferring permanently
DF	Bill Roffey	(England)	6 February 1954 (aged 29)	Orient	1984	On loan from Orient
DF	Terry Rowe	(England)	8 June 1964 (aged 19)	Youth	1982	
DF	Danis Salman	(England)	12 March 1960 (aged 23)	Youth	1975	
DF	Tony Spencer	(England)	23 April 1965 (aged 18)	Youth	1982	
DF	Graham Wilkins	(England)	28 June 1955 (aged 28)	Bury	1982	Loaned to Southend United
Midfielders
MF	Bob Booker	(England)	25 January 1958 (aged 25)	Bedmond Sports & Social	1978	
MF	Terry Bullivant	(England)	23 September 1956 (aged 26)	Charlton Athletic	1983	Loaned to Reading
MF	Tommy Finney	(Northern Ireland)	6 November 1952 (aged 30)	Cambridge United	1984	
MF	Mark Hopson	(England)	May 1966 (aged 17)	Youth	1982	
MF	Terry Hurlock (c)	(England)	22 November 1958 (aged 24)	Leytonstone/Ilford	1980	
MF	Chris Kamara	(England)	25 December 1957 (aged 25)	Portsmouth	1981	
MF	Tony Lynch	(England)	20 January 1966 (aged 17)	Youth	1983	
MF	Gary Roberts	(Wales)	5 April 1960 (aged 23)	Wembley	1980	
Forwards
FW	Keith Cassells	(England)	10 July 1957 (aged 26)	Southampton	1983	
FW	Francis Joseph	(England)	6 March 1960 (aged 23)	Wimbledon	1982	
FW	Tony Mahoney	(England)	29 September 1958 (aged 24)	Fulham	1982	
Players who left the club mid-season
DF	Ian Davies	(Wales)	29 March 1957 (aged 26)	Manchester City	1983	Returned to Manchester City after loan
DF	Andy Rollings	(England)	14 December 1954 (aged 28)	Torquay United	1983	Released
DF	Alan Whitehead	(England)	20 November 1956 (aged 26)	Bury	1981	Loaned to Scunthorpe United, transferred to Scunthorpe United
MF	Stan Bowles	(England)	24 December 1948 (aged 34)	Unattached	1983	Released
MF	Ron Harris	(England)	13 November 1944 (aged 38)	Chelsea	1980	Released
FW	Bill Garner	(England)	14 December 1947 (aged 35)	Chelmsford City	1983	Released

- Sources: The Big Brentford Book of the Eighties, Timeless Bees

== Coaching staff ==
=== Fred Callaghan (27 August 1983 – 2 February 1984) ===
Name	Role
(England) Fred Callaghan	Manager
(England) Frank Blunstone	Assistant Manager
(England) Eddie Lyons	Physiotherapist

=== Frank Blunstone (2 – 9 February 1984) ===
Name	Role
(England) Frank Blunstone	Caretaker Manager
(England) Eddie Lyons	Physiotherapist

=== Frank McLintock (9 February – 12 May 1984) ===
Name	Role
(Scotland) Frank McLintock	Manager
(Scotland) John Docherty	Assistant Manager
(England) Eddie Lyons	Physiotherapist

== Statistics ==
=== Appearances and goals ===
Substitute appearances in brackets.

Pos	Nat	Name	League		FA Cup		League Cup		FL Trophy		Total	
Pos	Nat	Name	Apps	Goals	Apps	Goals	Apps	Goals	Apps	Goals	Apps	Goals
GK	(Republic of Ireland)	Paddy Roche	25	0	3	0	0	0	0	0	28	0
GK	(England)	Trevor Swinburne	21	0	1	0	4	0	2	0	28	0
DF	(England)	Ian Bolton	14	1	1	0	—		2	0	17	1
DF	(England)	Bobby Fisher	17	0	—		—		2	0	19	0
DF	(Scotland)	Jim McNichol	19 (1)	4	4	0	3	0	0	0	26 (1)	4
DF	(England)	Paul Roberts	34	0	4	1	—		1	0	39	1
DF	(England)	Andy Rollings	1	0	—		—		—		1	0
DF	(England)	Terry Rowe	18 (3)	1	2	0	2 (1)	0	1	0	23 (4)	1
DF	(England)	Danis Salman	21	0	2	0	3	0	1	0	27	0
DF	(England)	Tony Spencer	5 (1)	0	0	0	2	0	0	0	7 (1)	0
DF	(England)	Alan Whitehead	18	0	3	0	4	0	—		25	0
DF	(England)	Graham Wilkins	12 (1)	0	0 (1)	0	1	0	0	0	13 (2)	0
MF	(England)	Bob Booker	26 (3)	4	0 (1)	0	3 (1)	0	2	0	31 (5)	4
MF	(England)	Stan Bowles	7 (1)	0	1	0	—		—		8 (1)	0
MF	(England)	Terry Bullivant	24	1	3	0	4	0	0	0	31	1
MF	(Northern Ireland)	Tommy Finney	14 (1)	2	—		—		1	1	15 (1)	3
MF	(England)	Ron Harris	3	0	—		2	0	—		5	0
MF	(England)	Terry Hurlock	32	4	4	1	2	0	2	0	40	0
MF	(England)	Chris Kamara	37 (1)	7	3	1	4	0	1	0	45 (1)	8
MF	(England)	Tony Lynch	2	0	0	0	0	0	2	0	4	0
MF	(Wales)	Gary Roberts	40 (1)	10	4	3	3	2	1 (1)	0	48 (2)	15
FW	(England)	Keith Cassells	26 (4)	9	1	1	2	0	0 (2)	0	29 (6)	10
FW	(England)	Bill Garner	2 (1)	1	—		—		—		2 (1)	1
FW	(England)	Francis Joseph	42 (1)	18	4	2	4	2	2	2	52 (1)	24
FW	(England)	Tony Mahoney	15 (8)	3	4	1	1	0	1	0	21 (8)	4
Players loaned in during the season
DF	(Wales)	Ian Davies	2	0	—		—		—		2	0
DF	(England)	Nigel Gray	16	1	—		—		1	0	17	1
DF	(England)	Bill Roffey	13	1	—		—		—		13	1

- Players listed in italics left the club mid-season.
- Source: The Big Brentford Book of the Eighties

=== Goalscorers ===
Pos.	Nat	Player	FL3	FAC	FLC	FLT	Total
FW	(England)	Francis Joseph	18	2	2	2	24
MF	(Wales)	Gary Roberts	10	3	2	0	15
FW	(England)	Keith Cassells	9	1	0	0	10
MF	(England)	Chris Kamara	7	1	0	0	8
MF	(England)	Bob Booker	4	0	0	0	4
DF	(Scotland)	Jim McNichol	4	0	0	0	4
FW	(England)	Tony Mahoney	3	1	0	0	4
MF	(Northern Ireland)	Tommy Finney	2	—	—	1	3
FW	(England)	Bill Garner	1	—	—	—	1
DF	(England)	Bill Roffey	1	—	—	—	1
DF	(England)	Nigel Gray	1	—	—	0	1
DF	(England)	Ian Bolton	1	0	—	0	1
DF	(England)	Paul Roberts	0	1	—	0	1
MF	(England)	Terry Bullivant	1	0	0	0	1
DF	(England)	Terry Rowe	1	0	0	0	1
Opponents			2	0	1	0	3
Total			69	10	5	3	87

- Players listed in italics left the club mid-season.
- Source: The Big Brentford Book of the Eighties

=== Management ===
Name	Nat	From	To	Record All Comps					Record League				
Name	Nat	From	To	P	W	D	L	W %	P	W	D	L	W %
Fred Callaghan	(England)	27 August 1983	1 February 1984	33	8	9	16	24.24	25	5	8	12	20.00
Frank Blunstone (caretaker)	(England)	4 February 1984	4 February 1984	1	0	0	1	0.00	1	0	0	1	0.00
Frank McLintock	(Scotland)	11 February 1984	12 May 1984	22	7	8	7	31.82	20	6	8	6	30.00

=== Summary ===
Games played	56 (46 Third Division, 4 FA Cup, 4 League Cup, 2 Football League Trophy)
Games won	15 (11 Third Division, 2 FA Cup, 1 League Cup, 1 Football League Trophy)
Games drawn	17 (16 Third Division, 1 FA Cup, 0 League Cup, 0 Football League Trophy)
Games lost	24 (19 Third Division, 1 FA Cup, 3 League Cup, 1 Football League Trophy)
Goals scored	87 (69 Third Division, 10 FA Cup, 5 League Cup, 3 Football League Trophy)
Goals conceded	103 (79 Third Division, 10 FA Cup, 10 League Cup, 4 Football League Trophy)
Clean sheets	9 (8 Third Division, 0 FA Cup, 1 League Cup, 0 Football League Trophy)
Biggest league win	3–0 on five occasions; 4–1 versus Preston North End, 3 April 1984
Worst league defeat	6–0 versus Southend United, 31 October 1983
Most appearances	53, Francis Joseph (43 Third Division, 4 FA Cup, 4 League Cup, 2 Football League Trophy)
Top scorer (league)	18, Francis Joseph
Top scorer (all competitions)	24, Francis Joseph

== Transfers & loans ==
Players transferred in
Date	Pos.	Name	Previous club	Fee	Ref.
July 1983	MF	(England) Terry Bullivant	(England) Charlton Athletic	Free	
August 1983	FW	(England) Bill Garner	(England) Chelmsford City	Non-contract	
August 1983	GK	(England) Trevor Swinburne	(England) Carlisle United	£12,000	
September 1983	MF	(England) Tony Lynch	(England) Maidstone United	n/a	
September 1983	DF	(England) Keith Millen	(England) Crystal Palace	n/a	
November 1983	DF	(England) Paul Roberts	(England) Millwall	£10,000	
November 1983	DF	(England) Andy Rollings	(England) Torquay United	Trial	
December 1983	DF	(England) Ian Bolton	(England) Watford	£2,000	
December 1983	MF	(England) Stan Bowles	Unattached	Non-contract	
February 1984	MF	(Northern Ireland) Tommy Finney	(England) Cambridge United	n/a	
February 1984	DF	(England) Bobby Fisher	(England) Cambridge United	£5,000	
Players loaned in
Date from	Pos.	Name	From	Date to	Ref.
1 September 1983	DF	(England) Paul Roberts	(England) Millwall	October 1983	
11 November 1983	DF	(Wales) Ian Davies	(England) Manchester City	December 1983	
1 March 1984	DF	(England) Nigel Gray	(England) Swindon Town	End of season	
March 1984	DF	(England) Bill Roffey	(England) Orient	End of season	
Players transferred out
Date	Pos.	Name	Subsequent club	Fee	Ref.
August 1983	GK	(Scotland) David McKellar	(England) Carlisle United	£4,000	
March 1984	DF	(England) Alan Whitehead	(England) Scunthorpe United	£40,000	
Players loaned out
Date from	Pos.	Name	To	Date to	Ref.
January 1984	DF	(England) Alan Whitehead	(England) Scunthorpe United	March 1984	
March 1984	MF	(England) Terry Bullivant	(England) Reading	n/a	
March 1984	DF	(England) Graham Wilkins	(England) Southend United	n/a	
Players released
Date	Pos.	Name	Subsequent club	Join date	Ref.
October 1983	MF	(England) Ron Harris	(England) Aldershot	1984	
December 1983	DF	(England) Andy Rollings	(England) Maidstone United	n/a	
1983	FW	(England) Bill Garner	n/a	n/a	
February 1984	MF	(England) Stan Bowles	Retired		
May 1984	FW	(England) Tony Mahoney	(England) Crystal Palace	June 1984	
May 1984	DF	(Scotland) Jim McNichol	(England) Exeter City	July 1984	
May 1984	GK	(Republic of Ireland) Paddy Roche	(England) Halifax Town	July 1984	
May 1984	DF	(England) Graham Wilkins	(England) Southall	1984	

== Awards ==
- Supporters' Player of the Year: Chris Kamara
- Players' Player of the Year: Chris Kamara
