= 1982–83 Brentford F.C. season =

English football team season

Brentford
1982–83 season
- Chairman: Martin Lange
- Manager: Fred Callaghan
- Stadium: Griffin Park
- Third Division: 9th
- FA Cup: Second round
- League Cup: Fourth round
- Football League Group Cup: First round
- Top goalscorer: League: Joseph (24); All: Joseph (26)
- Highest home attendance: 15,262
- Lowest home attendance: 4,413
- Average home league attendance: 6,184
Home colours	Away colours

During the 1982–83 English football season, Brentford competed in the Football League Third Division. The high point of a mid-table season was a run to the fourth round of the League Cup, then the furthest the club had then progressed in the competition. The 107 goals scored during the season is a club record.

== Season summary ==
After many failed attempts, Brentford manager Fred Callaghan finally signed what would prove to be a potent strike partnership during the 1982 off-season – Francis Joseph from Wimbledon and Tony Mahoney from Fulham. Goalkeeper David McKellar's contract was terminated after a serious breach of club discipline and he was replaced by former Chelsea goalkeeper Petar Borota. Barota only appeared in three Football League Group Cup fixtures before being in turn replaced by Paddy Roche. The defensive ranks were cleared out, with Pat Kruse, Mark Hill, Robbie Johnson, Paul Shrubb and Kevin Teer all released. Experienced former Chelsea defender Graham Wilkins arrived on a free transfer.

Brentford had a busy first half of the season, reaching the fourth round of the League Cup for the first time in club history. Higher-division clubs Blackburn Rovers and Swansea City were knocked out in the second and third rounds before the Bees fell to First Division club Nottingham Forest at the City Ground. Brentford advanced to the second round of the FA Cup, before suffering a disappointing replay defeat to Fourth Division club Swindon Town. Forward Tony Mahoney, who had up until that point scored 15 goals in 28 appearances, broke his leg in three places during the defeat.

Despite heavy scoring from forwards Francis Joseph, Tony Mahoney and winger Gary Roberts early season, Brentford's league form was patchy mid-season. 10 defeats from 14 matches between late December 1982 and early March 1983 ultimately killed hopes of a promotion challenge. Manager Fred Callaghan signed Southampton forward Keith Cassells in a bid to replace Tony Mahoney's goals and while there was an upturn in form during the final two months of the season, Brentford finished in 9th place. The Bees finished the season with the best overall and best away attacking records in the Third Division.

Four club records were set or equalled during the season:

- Most goals scored in a season (all competitions): 107
- Record Football League away win: 7–1 versus Exeter City, 23 April 1983
- Most goals scored in an away Football League win: 7 (7–1 versus Exeter City, 23 April 1983)
- Three goalscorers with 10 or more goals by Christmas Day (all competitions): Francis Joseph, Gary Roberts, Tony Mahoney

== League table ==
Pos	Team	Pld	W	D	L	GF	GA	GD	Pts
7	Bristol Rovers	46	22	9	15	84	58	+26	75
8	Plymouth Argyle	46	19	8	19	61	66	−5	65
9	Brentford	46	18	10	18	88	77	+11	64
10	Walsall	46	17	13	16	64	63	+1	64
11	Sheffield United	46	19	7	20	62	64	−2	64

== Results ==
Brentford's goal tally listed first.

=== Legend ===
Win	Draw	Loss

=== Pre-season and friendlies ===
Date	Opponent	Venue	Result	Attendance	Scorer(s)
5 August 1982	Hayes	A	0–3	n/a	
6 August 1982	Walton & Hersham	A	2–0	n/a	Roberts, Johnson
12 August 1982	Kingstonian	A	2–0	n/a	Johnson, Tonge
13 October 1982	Flackwell Heath	A	2–1	n/a	Roberts, Mahoney
10 May 1983	Southampton	H	0–2	2,048	

=== Football League Third Division ===
No.	Date	Opponent	Venue	Result	Attendance	Scorer(s)
1	28 August 1982	Bristol Rovers	H	5–1	5,542	Mahoney, Joseph (2), Roberts (2)
2	4 September 1982	Wigan Athletic	A	2–3	5,019	Mahoney, Joseph
3	8 September 1982	Reading	A	1–1	3,790	Joseph
4	11 September 1982	Southend United	H	4–2	5,604	Mahoney (2), Joseph, Roberts
5	18 September 1982	Orient	A	3–3	3,458	Mahoney, Roberts, Booker
6	25 September 1982	Millwall	H	1–1	6,455	McNichol
7	28 September 1982	Newport County	H	2–0	5,706	Joseph, Mahoney
8	2 October 1982	Walsall	A	1–2	2,723	Kamara
9	9 October 1982	Chesterfield	H	4–2	5,706	Hurlock, Joseph (2), Bowles (pen)
10	16 October 1982	Doncaster Rovers	A	4–4	3,266	Mahoney, McNichol, Roberts, Booker
11	20 October 1982	Oxford United	A	2–2	6,324	Joseph, Mahoney
12	23 October 1982	Lincoln City	H	2–0	8,017	Joseph, Bowen
13	30 October 1982	Plymouth Argyle	A	0–2	4,036	
14	2 November 1982	Preston North End	H	3–1	6,142	McNichol, Kamara, Roberts
15	6 November 1982	Bradford City	H	0–2	6,669	
16	13 November 1982	Huddersfield Town	A	0–2	10,034	
17	27 November 1982	Sheffield United	A	2–1	10,202	Booker, Joseph
18	4 December 1982	Wrexham	H	4–1	5,606	Kamara, Mahoney, Joseph (2)
19	18 December 1982	Exeter City	H	4–0	5,580	Bowles, Walker, Whitehead, Booker
20	27 December 1982	Portsmouth	A	1–2	14,476	Joseph
21	28 December 1982	Gillingham	H	1–1	7,796	Joseph
22	1 January 1983	Bournemouth	A	3–4	5,593	Roberts, Joseph (2)
23	3 January 1983	Cardiff City	H	1–3	7,602	Bowles (pen)
24	8 January 1983	Wigan Athletic	H	1–3	4,939	Roberts
25	15 January 1983	Bristol Rovers	A	0–2	5,450	
26	22 January 1983	Orient	H	5–2	5,209	Booker (2), Bowles (pen), Roberts, Hurlock
27	29 January 1983	Southend United	A	2–4	3,310	Kamara, Roberts
28	6 February 1983	Newport County	A	0–0	3,401	
29	12 February 1983	Reading	H	1–2	6,273	Bowles (pen)
30	19 February 1983	Chesterfield	A	1–2	2,291	Cassells
31	26 February 1983	Doncaster Rovers	H	1–0	4,413	Bowles (pen)
32	1 March 1983	Preston North End	A	0–3	3,663	
33	5 March 1983	Lincoln City	A	1–2	3,698	Cassells
34	11 March 1983	Plymouth Argyle	H	2–0	4,967	Joseph, Kamara
35	19 March 1983	Bradford City	A	1–0	3,828	Cassells
36	22 March 1983	Oxford United	H	1–1	5,086	Bowles
37	26 March 1983	Huddersfield Town	H	1–0	6,277	Bowles (pen)
38	1 April 1983	Portsmouth	H	1–1	12,593	Joseph
39	2 April 1983	Gillingham	A	2–2	4,168	Kamara (2)
40	8 April 1983	Wrexham	A	4–3	2,104	Kamara, Cassells, Joseph (2)
41	16 April 1983	Walsall	H	2–3	4,868	Bowles (pen), Cassells
42	23 April 1983	Exeter City	A	7–1	2,759	Joseph (2), Kamara (2), Cassells (2), Roberts
43	30 April 1983	Sheffield United	H	2–1	4,987	Hurlock, Roberts
44	2 May 1983	Cardiff City	A	1–3	9,112	Kamara
45	8 May 1983	Millwall	A	0–1	9,097	
46	14 May 1983	Bournemouth	H	2–1	6,191	Joseph, Bowles (pen)

=== FA Cup ===
Round	Date	Opponent	Venue	Result	Attendance	Scorer(s)	Notes
1R	20 November 1982	Windsor & Eton	A	7–0	6,309	Mahoney (3), McNichol, Joseph, Hurlock (2)	(Note: Match played at Griffin Park, Brentford.)
2R	11 December 1982	Swindon Town	A	2–2	7,176	Bowen, Roberts	
2R (replay)	14 December 1982	Swindon Town	H	1–3 (a.e.t.)	7,883	Roberts	

=== Football League Cup ===
Round	Date	Opponent	Venue	Result	Attendance	Scorer(s)
1R (1st leg)	30 August 1982	Wimbledon	A	1–1	2,907	Roberts
1R (2nd leg)	14 September 1982	Wimbledon	H	2–0 (won 3–1 on aggregate)	5,747	Mahoney (2)
2R (1st leg)	5 October 1982	Blackburn Rovers	H	3–2	6,201	Joseph, Hurlock, Bowles (pen)
2R (2nd leg)	27 October 1982	Blackburn Rovers	A	0–0 (won 3–2 on aggregate)	4,137	
3R	9 November 1982	Swansea City	H	1–1	15,262	Roberts
3R (replay)	17 November 1982	Swansea City	A	2–1	6,676	Roberts, Mahoney
4R	30 November 1982	Nottingham Forest	A	0–2	16,479	

=== Football League Group Cup ===
Round	Date	Opponent	Venue	Result	Attendance	Scorer(s)	Notes
R1 (match 1)	14 August 1982	Crystal Palace	H	2–2	3,397	Joseph, Roberts	(Note: Match not classified as a first team fixture by Brentford.)
R1 (match 2)	17 August 1982	Millwall	A	0–3	2,105		
R1 (match 3)	21 August 1982	Wimbledon	A	3–1	2,019	Johnson, Roberts, Mahoney	

- Sources: 100 Years of Brentford, The Big Brentford Book of the Eighties, Statto

== Playing squad ==
Players' ages are as of the opening day of the 1982–83 season.

Pos.	Name	Nat.	Date of birth (age)	Signed from	Signed in	Notes
Goalkeepers
GK	Paddy Roche	(Republic of Ireland)	4 January 1951 (aged 31)	Manchester United	1982	
Defenders
DF	Bob Booker	(England)	25 January 1958 (aged 24)	Bedmond Sports & Social	1978	
DF	Ron Harris	(England)	13 November 1944 (aged 37)	Chelsea	1980	Assistant manager
DF	Jim McNichol	(Scotland)	9 June 1958 (aged 24)	Luton Town	1978	
DF	Terry Rowe	(England)	8 June 1964 (aged 18)	Youth	1982	
DF	Danis Salman	(England)	12 March 1960 (aged 22)	Youth	1975	
DF	Tony Spencer	(England)	23 April 1965 (aged 17)	Youth	1982	
DF	Barry Tucker	(Wales)	28 August 1952 (aged 30)	Northampton Town	1978	Loaned to Northampton Town
DF	Alan Whitehead	(England)	20 November 1956 (aged 25)	Bury	1981	
DF	Graham Wilkins	(England)	28 June 1955 (aged 27)	Chelsea	1982	
Midfielders
MF	Stan Bowles	(England)	24 December 1948 (aged 33)	Orient	1981	
MF	Terry Hurlock	(England)	22 November 1958 (aged 23)	Leytonstone/Ilford	1980	
MF	Chris Kamara (c)	(England)	25 December 1957 (aged 24)	Portsmouth	1981	
MF	Gary Roberts	(Wales)	5 April 1960 (aged 22)	Wembley	1980	
MF	Keith Tonge	(England)	6 November 1964 (aged 17)	Youth	1982	
MF	Paul Walker	(England)	17 December 1960 (aged 21)	Youth	1976	
Forwards
FW	Keith Cassells	(England)	10 July 1957 (aged 25)	Southampton	1983	
FW	Gary Johnson	(England)	14 September 1959 (aged 22)	Chelsea	1980	
FW	Francis Joseph	(England)	6 March 1960 (aged 22)	Wimbledon	1982	
FW	Tony Mahoney	(England)	29 September 1958 (aged 23)	Fulham	1982	
Players who left the club mid-season
GK	Petar Borota	(Socialist Federal Republic of Yugoslavia)	5 March 1952 (aged 30)	Chelsea	1982	Released
DF	Jimmy Holmes	(Republic of Ireland)	11 November 1953 (aged 28)	Leicester City	1983	Released
DF	Les Strong	(England)	3 July 1953 (aged 29)	Fulham	1982	Returned to Fulham after loan
FW	Keith Bowen	(Wales)	26 February 1958 (aged 24)	Northampton Town	1981	Loaned to Colchester United, transferred to Colchester United

- Sources: The Big Brentford Book of the Eighties, Timeless Bees

== Coaching staff ==
Name	Role
(England) Fred Callaghan	Manager
(England) Ron Harris	Assistant Manager
(England) Eddie Lyons	Physiotherapist

== Statistics ==
=== Appearances and goals ===
Substitute appearances in brackets.

Pos	Nat	Name	League		FA Cup		League Cup		FL Grp Cup		Total	
Pos	Nat	Name	Apps	Goals	Apps	Goals	Apps	Goals	Apps	Goals	Apps	Goals
GK	(Socialist Federal Republic of Yugoslavia)	Petar Borota	0	0	—		0	0	3	0	0	0
GK	(Republic of Ireland)	Paddy Roche	46	0	3	0	7	0	—		56	0
DF	(England)	Bob Booker	31 (8)	6	2 (1)	0	3 (1)	0	1 (2)	0	36 (10)	6
DF	(England)	Ron Harris	9	0	1	0	4	0	0	0	14	0
DF	(Republic of Ireland)	Jimmy Holmes	4	0	—		—		—		4	0
DF	(Scotland)	Jim McNichol	32	3	1	1	6	0	2	0	38	4
DF	(England)	Terry Rowe	34	0	3	0	6	0	1	0	43	0
DF	(England)	Danis Salman	1	0	0	0	0	0	0	0	1	0
DF	(England)	Tony Spencer	9	0	0	0	1	0	1	0	10	0
DF	(Wales)	Barry Tucker	5	0	—		2	0	2	0	7	0
DF	(England)	Alan Whitehead	41	1	3	0	7	0	3	0	51	1
DF	(England)	Graham Wilkins	24 (1)	0	2	0	2	0	3	0	28 (1)	0
MF	(England)	Stan Bowles	42	10	3	0	7	1	2	0	52	11
MF	(England)	Terry Hurlock	39	3	3	2	5	1	3	0	47	6
MF	(England)	Chris Kamara	44	11	3	0	7	0	3	0	54	11
MF	(Wales)	Gary Roberts	45	12	3	2	7	3	3	2	55	17
MF	(England)	Paul Walker	9 (7)	1	0	0	0	0	0	0	9 (7)	1
FW	(Wales)	Keith Bowen	5 (8)	1	0 (2)	1	0 (1)	0	1	0	5 (11)	2
FW	(England)	Keith Cassells	16	7	—		—		—		16	7
FW	(England)	Gary Johnson	4 (4)	0	0	0	0	0	2	1	4 (4)	0
FW	(England)	Francis Joseph	43	24	3	1	7	1	1	1	53	26
FW	(England)	Tony Mahoney	18	9	3	3	7	3	2	1	28	15
Players loaned in during the season
DF	(England)	Les Strong	5	0	—		—		—		5	0

- Players listed in italics left the club mid-season.
- Football League Group Cup appearances and goals are not included in overall player totals.
- Source: The Big Brentford Book of the Eighties

=== Goalscorers ===
Pos.	Nat	Player	FL3	FAC	FLC	GPC	Total
FW	(England)	Francis Joseph	24	1	1	1	26
MF	(Wales)	Gary Roberts	12	2	3	2	17
FW	(England)	Tony Mahoney	9	3	3	1	15
MF	(England)	Chris Kamara	11	0	0	0	11
MF	(England)	Stan Bowles	10	0	1	0	11
FW	(England)	Keith Cassells	7	—	—	—	7
DF	(England)	Bob Booker	6	0	0	0	6
MF	(England)	Terry Hurlock	3	2	1	0	6
DF	(Scotland)	Jim McNichol	3	1	0	0	4
FW	(Wales)	Keith Bowen	1	1	0	0	2
MF	(England)	Paul Walker	1	0	0	0	1
DF	(England)	Alan Whitehead	1	0	0	0	1
FW	(England)	Gary Johnson	0	0	0	1	—
Total			88	10	9	5	107

- Players listed in italics left the club mid-season.
- Football League Group Cup appearances and goals are not included in overall player totals.
- Source: The Big Brentford Book of the Eighties

=== Management ===
Name	Nat	From	To	Record All Comps					Record League				
Name	Nat	From	To	P	W	D	L	W %	P	W	D	L	W %
Fred Callaghan	(England)	28 August 1982	14 May 1983	56	22	14	20	39.29	46	18	10	18	39.13

=== Summary ===
Games played	56 (46 Third Division, 3 FA Cup, 7 League Cup)
Games won	22 (18 Third Division, 1 FA Cup, 3 League Cup)
Games drawn	14 (10 Third Division, 1 FA Cup, 3 League Cup)
Games lost	20 (18 Third Division, 1 FA Cup, 1 League Cup)
Goals scored	107 (88 Third Division, 10 FA Cup, 9 League Cup)
Goals conceded	89 (77 Third Division, 5 FA Cup, 7 League Cup)
Clean sheets	11 (8 Third Division, 1 FA Cup, 2 League Cup)
Biggest league win	7–1 versus Exeter City, 23 April 1983
Worst league defeat	3–0 versus Preston North End, 1 March 1983
Most appearances	56, Paddy Roche (46 Third Division, 3 FA Cup, 7 League Cup)
Top scorer (league)	24, Francis Joseph
Top scorer (all competitions)	26, Francis Joseph

== Transfers & loans ==
Players transferred in
Date	Pos.	Name	Previous club	Fee	Ref.
July 1982	FW	(England) Francis Joseph	(England) Wimbledon	Trial	
July 1982	FW	(England) Tony Mahoney	(England) Fulham	Trial	
July 1982	DF	(England) Graham Wilkins	(England) Chelsea	Free	
August 1982	GK	(Socialist Federal Republic of Yugoslavia) Petar Borota	(England) Chelsea	Free	
August 1982	GK	(Republic of Ireland) Paddy Roche	(England) Manchester United	Free	
September 1982	GK	(England) Keith Waterman	(England) Farnborough	n/a	
November 1982	GK	(England) Peter Caswell	(England) Leatherhead	n/a	
November 1982	MF	(England) Mark Hopson	n/a	n/a	
February 1983	FW	(England) Keith Cassells	(England) Southampton	£25,000	
February 1983	DF	(Republic of Ireland) Jimmy Holmes	(England) Leicester City	Non-contract	
Players loaned in
Date from	Pos.	Name	From	Date to	Ref.
December 1982	DF	(England) Les Strong	(England) Fulham	January 1983	
Players transferred out
Date	Pos.	Name	Subsequent club	Fee	Ref.
April 1983	DF	(Wales) Keith Bowen	(England) Colchester United	£12,000	
Players loaned out
Date from	Pos.	Name	To	Date to	Ref.
October 1982	DF	(Wales) Barry Tucker	(England) Northampton Town	End of season	
March 1983	DF	(Wales) Keith Bowen	(England) Colchester United	April 1983	
April 1983	GK	(Scotland) David McKellar	(Hong Kong) Happy Valley	July 1983	
Players released
Date	Pos.	Name	Subsequent club	Join date	Ref.
August 1982	GK	(Socialist Federal Republic of Yugoslavia) Petar Borota	(Portugal) Portimonense	1982	
November 1982	GK	(England) Keith Waterman	n/a	n/a	
March 1983	DF	(Republic of Ireland) Jimmy Holmes	(England) Torquay United	March 1983	
June 1983	MF	(England) Stan Bowles	Retired		
June 1983	FW	(England) Gary Johnson	(South Africa) Johannesburg Rangers	1983	
June 1983	MF	(England) Keith Tonge	(England) Leytonstone/Ilford	1983	
June 1983	DF	(Wales) Barry Tucker	(England) Northampton Town	1983	
June 1983	MF	(England) Paul Walker	(South Africa) Johannesburg Rangers	1983	
1983	GK	(England) Peter Caswell	n/a	n/a	

== Awards ==
- Supporters' Player of the Year: Bob Booker
- Players' Player of the Year: Bob Booker
