= Tony Spencer =

English footballer

Personal information
- Full name: Anthony Raymond Spencer
- Date of birth: 27 April 1965 (age 61)
- Place of birth: Chiswick, England
- Position: Full back

Youth career
- 1981–1983: Brentford

Senior career*
Years	Team	Apps	(Gls)
1981–1985	Brentford	18	(0)
1984–1985	→ Aldershot (loan)	10	(0)
- * Club domestic league appearances and goals

Anthony Raymond Spencer (born 27 April 1965) is an English retired professional footballer who played as a full back in the Football League for Brentford and Aldershot. He spent three years with Brentford and had a loan spell with Aldershot during the 1984–85 season. A knee injury forced his retirement from football in 1985.

== Career statistics ==
Appearances and goals by club, season and competition
Club	Season	League			FA Cup		League Cup		Other		Total	
Club	Season	Division	Apps	Goals	Apps	Goals	Apps	Goals	Apps	Goals	Apps	Goals
Brentford	1981–82	Third Division	3	0	0	0	0	0	0	0	3	0
Brentford	1982–83	Third Division	9	0	0	0	1	0	—		10	0
Brentford	1983–84	Third Division	6	0	0	0	2	0	0	0	8	0
Brentford	Total		18	0	0	0	3	0	0	0	21	0
Aldershot	1984-85	Fourth Division	10	0	—		—		—		10	0
Career total			28	0	0	0	3	0	0	0	31	0
