= Keith Tonge =

English footballer

Personal information
- Full name: Keith Andrew Tonge
- Date of birth: 6 November 1964 (age 61)
- Place of birth: Edmonton, England
- Position: Midfielder

Youth career
- Tottenham Hotspur
- 1981–1982: Brentford

Senior career*
Years	Team	Apps	(Gls)
1982–1983	Brentford	1	(0)
- Leytonstone/Ilford
- * Club domestic league appearances and goals

Keith Andrew Tonge (born 6 November 1964) is an English retired professional footballer who played in the Football League for Brentford as a midfielder.

== Career ==
Tonge began his career in the youth team at Tottenham Hotspur, before transferring to the youth team at Third Division club Brentford. He made one professional appearance for the Bees, when he replaced Paul Walker during a 4–1 league defeat to Reading on 27 January 1982. He was offered a professional contract in November 1982, but was released at the end of the 1982–83 season. Tongue later played for Isthmian League Premier Division club Leytonstone/Ilford.

== Career statistics ==
Appearances and goals by club, season and competition
Club	Season	League			FA Cup		League Cup		Total	
Club	Season	Division	Apps	Goals	Apps	Goals	Apps	Goals	Apps	Goals
Brentford	1981–82	Third Division	1	0	0	0	0	0	1	0
Brentford	1982–83	Third Division	0	0	0	0	0	0	0	0
Career total			1	0	0	0	0	0	1	0
