= Tommy Finney =

Northern Irish footballer and manager

Personal information
- Full name: Thomas Finney
- Date of birth: 6 November 1952 (age 73)
- Place of birth: Belfast, Northern Ireland
- Height: 5 ft 10 in (1.78 m)
- Position: Midfielder

Youth career
- Linfield

Senior career*
Years	Team	Apps	(Gls)
- Distillery
1971–1973	Crusaders		(25)
1973–1974	Luton Town	14	(5)
1974–1976	Sunderland	15	(1)
1976–1984	Cambridge United	268	(56)
1984	Brentford	20	(2)
1984–1986	Cambridge United	64	(5)
- Cambridge City
- Ely City
- March Town
- Histon

International career
1972–1973	Northern Ireland Amateurs	5	(1)
1974–1980	Northern Ireland	14	(2)

Managerial career
- Ely City
- 1993–1995: Histon
- * Club domestic league appearances and goals

Thomas Finney (born 6 November 1952) is a Northern Irish former footballer who made over 260 appearances in the Football League for Cambridge United as a midfielder. He also played League football for Luton Town, Sunderland and Brentford. Finney later managed Ely City and Histon in non-League football. He was a member of the Northern Ireland squad at the 1982 World Cup.

== International career ==
Finney scored one goal in five appearances for the Northern Ireland amateur team between 1972 and 1973. He won 14 caps and scored two goals for the senior team between 1974 and 1980. He was a member of the Northern Ireland 1982 World Cup squad, but did not make an appearance.

== Personal life ==
While a junior player in Northern Ireland, Finney worked for a gas company.

== Career statistics ==
Appearances and goals by club, season and competition
Club	Season	League			National cup (Note: Includes FA Cup)		League cup (Note: Includes Football League Cup)		Other		Total	
Club	Season	Division	Apps	Goals	Apps	Goals	Apps	Goals	Apps	Goals	Apps	Goals
Luton Town	1973–74	Second Division	14	5	3	0	4	1	—		21	6
Sunderland	1974–75	Second Division	7	0	1	0	0	0	1 (Note: Appearance in Texaco Cup)	0	9	0
Sunderland	1975–76	Second Division	8	1	5	1	0	0	2 (Note: Appearances in Anglo-Scottish Cup)	0	15	2
Sunderland	Total		15	1	6	1	0	0	3	0	24	2
Brentford	1983–84	Third Division	15	2	—		—		1 (Note: Appearance in Football League Trophy)	1	16	3
Brentford	1984–85	Third Division	5	0	1	0	2	0	—		8	0
Brentford	Total		20	2	1	0	2	0	1	1	24	3
Career total			49	8	10	1	6	1	4	1	69	11

== Honours ==
Luton Town

- Football League Second Division second-place promotion: 1973–74

Cambridge United

- Football League Third Division second-place promotion: 1977–78
- Football League Fourth Division: 1976–77

Individual

- Cambridge United Hall of Fame
