= Andy Rollings =

English footballer

Personal information
- Full name: Andrew Nicholas Rollings
- Date of birth: 14 December 1954 (age 71)
- Place of birth: Portishead, England
- Position: Centre back

Youth career
- Easton
- –1972: Norwich City

Senior career*
Years	Team	Apps	(Gls)
1972–1974	Norwich City	4	(0)
1974–1980	Brighton & Hove Albion	168	(11)
1980–1981	Swindon Town	12	(1)
1981–1983	Portsmouth	29	(1)
1983	Torquay United	2	(0)
1983	Brentford	1	(0)
1984	Aldershot		
1984	Maidstone United	8	(3)
- Littlehampton Town
1986	Steyning Town		
1986–1987	Brighton & Hove Albion	0	(0)
1987	Southwick		
- Gorleston
- Peacehaven & Telscombe
1992	Newhaven		
- Shoreham
- * Club domestic league appearances and goals

Andrew Nicholas Rollings (born 14 December 1954) is an English retired professional footballer, best remembered for his six years as a centre back in the Football League with Brighton & Hove Albion. He also played League football for Portsmouth, Swindon Town, Norwich City, Torquay United and Brentford.

== Personal life ==
In the mid-1980s, Rollings opened the Chalet Café in Preston Park, Brighton, with his wife, Judy. As of October 2019, he was still running the café.

== Career statistics ==
Appearances and goals by club, season and competition
Club	Season	League			FA Cup		League Cup		Other		Total	
Club	Season	Division	Apps	Goals	Apps	Goals	Apps	Goals	Apps	Goals	Apps	Goals
Norwich City	1973–74	First Division	4	0	0	0	0	0	—		4	0
Brighton & Hove Albion	1979–80	First Division	7	1	0	0	0	0	—		7	1
Swindon Town	1980–81	Third Division	12	1	0	0	4	1	—		16	2
Portsmouth	1981–82	Third Division	19	1	2	0	3	0	1 (Note: Appearance in Hampshire Professional Cup)	0	25	1
Portsmouth	1982–83	Third Division	10	0	0	0	0	0	1	0	11	0
Portsmouth	Total		29	1	2	0	3	0	2	0	36	1
Brentford	1983–84	Third Division	1	0	0	0	0	0	0	0	1	0
Career total			53	3	2	0	7	1	2	0	64	4

== Honours ==
Brighton & Hove Albion

- Football League Second Division second-place promotion: 1978–79
- Football League Third Division second-place promotion: 1976–77

Portsmouth

- Football League Third Division: 1982–83
