= Graham Wilkins =

English footballer

Personal information
- Full name: Graham George Wilkins
- Date of birth: 28 June 1955 (age 71)
- Place of birth: Hillingdon, England
- Position: Full-back

Youth career
- 1965–1972: Chelsea

Senior career*
Years	Team	Apps	(Gls)
1972–1982	Chelsea	137	(1)
1982–1984	Brentford	38	(0)
1984	→ Southend United (loan)	3	(0)
- Southall
- * Club domestic league appearances and goals

Graham George Wilkins (born 28 June 1955) is an English retired professional football full-back who made over 130 appearances in the Football League for Chelsea. He also played league football for Brentford and Southend United.

== Career ==
Wilkins was born in Hillingdon. Able to play on either flank as a full-back, he began his career at Chelsea at the age of 10 and signed his first professional contract in 1972. He remained a bit-part player until the 1976–77 season, when he made 29 appearances to help the Blues to promotion back to the First Division. Wilkins remained at Stamford Bridge until July 1982, by which time he had made 151 appearances and scored one goal. He dropped down to the Third Division to join West London neighbours Brentford on a free transfer, but with the Bees he experienced "the worst two years of my life. I dislocated my shoulder, had seven teeth kicked out, ruptured my cruciate ligaments and that was it". Wilkins' final appearances as a professional came late in the 1983–84 season, on loan at Third Division club Southend United.

== Personal life ==
Wilkins was the son of footballer George Wilkins and the eldest of four Hillingdon-born brothers who played professional football. He later worked at Heathrow Airport.

== Career statistics ==
Appearances and goals by club, season and competition
Club	Season	League			FA Cup		League Cup		Other		Total	
Club	Season	Division	Apps	Goals	Apps	Goals	Apps	Goals	Apps	Goals	Apps	Goals
Chelsea	1972–73	First Division	1	0	0	0	0	0	—		1	0
Chelsea	1973–74	First Division	4	0	1	0	0	0	—		5	0
Chelsea	1974–75	First Division	1	0	0	0	1	0	—		2	0
Chelsea	1975–76	Second Division	13	0	0	0	0	0	—		13	0
Chelsea	1976–77	Second Division	26	0	0	0	3	0	—		29	0
Chelsea	1977–78	First Division	21	0	3	0	0	0	—		24	0
Chelsea	1978–79	First Division	28	1	1	0	0	0	—		29	1
Chelsea	1979–80	Second Division	18	0	0	0	1	0	—		19	0
Chelsea	1980–81	Second Division	14	0	0	0	2	0	—		16	0
Chelsea	1981–82	Second Division	11	0	1	0	1	0	—		13	0
Chelsea	Total		137	1	6	0	8	0	—		151	1
Brentford	1982–83	Third Division	25	0	2	0	2	0	3 (Note: Appearances in Football League Group Cup)	0	29	0
Brentford	1983–84	Third Division	13	0	1	0	1	0	—		15	0
Brentford	Total		38	0	3	0	3	0	3	0	47	0
Southend United (loan)	1983–84	Third Division	3	0	—		—		1 (Note: Appearance in Football League Trophy)	0	4	0
Career total			178	1	9	0	11	0	4	0	202	1

== Honours ==
Chelsea

- Football League Second Division second-place promotion: 1976–77
