= Tony Mahoney =

English footballer (born 1959)

Personal information
- Full name: Anthony Joseph Mahoney
- Date of birth: 29 September 1959 (age 67)
- Place of birth: Barking, England
- Position: Forward

Youth career
- Fulham

Senior career*
Years	Team	Apps	(Gls)
1976–1982	Fulham	59	(10)
1981	→ Northampton Town (loan)	6	(0)
1982–1984	Brentford	41	(12)
1984–1985	Crystal Palace	18	(4)
1985–1988	Grays Athletic		
1988–1989	Dartford		
1989–1999	Canvey Island		

International career
- England Youth
- * Club domestic league appearances and goals

Anthony Joseph Mahoney (born 29 September 1959) is an English retired professional footballer who played in the Football League for Fulham, Brentford and Crystal Palace as a forward. He later forged a career in non-League football and played a decade with Canvey Island.

== Club career ==
=== Fulham ===
Mahoney began his career as a trainee with Second Division club Fulham. Aged just 17 years and 38 days, he made his professional debut in a league match versus Cardiff City on 6 November 1976 and became the-then second-youngest Fulham debutant. Out of favour at Fulham, Mahoney joined Fourth Division club Northampton Town on loan in October 1981 and made six league appearances without scoring. Mahoney failed to break through to the first team at Craven Cottage was released in 1982. He made 69 appearances and scored 13 goals during six seasons as a first team player with the club.

=== Brentford ===
Mahoney joined Third Division club Brentford on a three-month trial in July 1982. Partnering Francis Joseph up front, Mahoney had a good start to life at Griffin Park, scoring 15 goals in his first 28 appearances and signing a permanent contract, before suffering a fractured leg in an FA Cup second round replay versus Swindon Town in December. After recovering, he failed to show the same kind of form and was released at the end of the 1983–84 season. Mahoney made 58 appearances and scored 19 goals during his two years with Brentford.

=== Crystal Palace ===
Mahoney joined Second Division club Crystal Palace in June 1984. In a one-season stay at Selhurst Park, he made 24 appearances and scored five goals.

=== Non-League football ===
Mahoney dropped into non-League football to sign for Isthmian League First Division club Grays Athletic in July 1985. He was part of the team which secured promotion to the Premier Division and won two cups during the 1987–88 season, with Mahoney's striker partnership with Micky Welch being regarded as the most-feared in non-League football. Mahoney transferred to Southern League Premier Division club Dartford in 1988 and then to Essex Senior League club Canvey Island in 1989. He was a part of a golden era for Canvey Island, which saw the club rise from the Essex Senior League to the Isthmian League First Division with three promotions in three seasons. Mahoney was also part of the Canvey Island team which went on a run to the first round proper of the 1995–96 FA Cup, when they took Second Division club Brighton & Hove Albion to a replay before going out.

== International career ==
Mahoney represented England Youth at international level.

== Personal life ==
Mahoney married his wife Michele on Saturday 21 February 1981 in Grays and together with best man Kevin Lock, he played for Fulham later that day. Mahoney's son, Tony Jr, was fatally stabbed in September 1999.

== Career statistics ==
Appearances and goals by club, season and competition
Club	Season	League			FA Cup		League Cup		Other		Total	
Club	Season	Division	Apps	Goals	Apps	Goals	Apps	Goals	Apps	Goals	Apps	Goals
Brentford	1982–83	Third Division	18	9	3	3	7	3	—		28	15
Brentford	1983–84	Third Division	23	3	4	1	1	0	1 (Note: Appearances in Football League Trophy)	0	29	4
Career total			41	12	7	4	8	3	1	0	57	19

== Honours ==
Grays Athletic

- Isthmian League First Division: 1987–88
- Essex Senior Cup: 1987–88
- Essex Thameside Trophy: 1987–88

Canvey Island

- Essex Senior League: 1992–93
- Isthmian League First Division: 1998–99
- Isthmian League Second Division: 1995–96, 1997–98
- Essex Senior Cup: 1998–99
