= Nigel Gray (footballer) =

English footballer

Personal information
- Full name: Nigel Robert Gray
- Date of birth: 2 November 1956 (age 69)
- Place of birth: Fulham, England
- Height: 6 ft 3 in (1.91 m)
- Position: Central defender

Youth career
- Beaumont
- –1974: Orient

Senior career*
Years	Team	Apps	(Gls)
1974–1983	Orient	233	(4)
1982	→ Blackburn Rovers (loan)	0	(0)
1982	→ Charlton Athletic (loan)	3	(0)
1983–1985	Swindon Town	33	(0)
1984	→ Brentford (loan)	16	(1)
1984	→ Aldershot (loan)	4	(0)
1985–	Enfield		
–1987	Wycombe Wanderers		
1987–1988	Tooting & Mitcham United		(2)
- * Club domestic league appearances and goals

Nigel Robert Gray (born 2 November 1956) is an English former professional footballer, best remembered for his 9-year spell as a central defender in the Football League with Orient. He also played League football for Swindon Town, Brentford, Aldershot, and Charlton Athletic.

== Career statistics ==
Appearances and goals by club, season and competition
Club	Season	League			FA Cup		League Cup		Other		Total	
Club	Season	Division	Apps	Goals	Apps	Goals	Apps	Goals	Apps	Goals	Apps	Goals
Swindon Town	1983–84	Fourth Division	15	0	0	0	1	0	0	0	16	0
Swindon Town	1984–85	Fourth Division	18	0	0	0	1	0	2 (Note: Appearances in Football League Trophy)	0	21	0
Swindon Town	Total		33	0	0	0	2	0	2	0	37	0
Brentford (loan)	1983–84	Third Division	16	1	—		—		1	0	17	1
Career total			49	1	0	0	2	0	3	0	54	1
