= Ian Davies (footballer) =

English footballer

Personal information
- Full name: Ian Claude Davies
- Date of birth: 29 March 1957 (age 69)
- Place of birth: Bristol, England
- Position: Left back

Youth career
- –1973: Norwich City

Senior career*
Years	Team	Apps	(Gls)
1973–1979	Norwich City	32	(2)
1978	→ Detroit Express (loan)	30	(0)
1979–1982	Newcastle United	75	(3)
1982–1984	Manchester City	7	(0)
1982	→ Bury (loan)	14	(0)
1983	→ Brentford (loan)	2	(0)
1984	→ Cambridge United (loan)	5	(0)
1984–1985	Carlisle United	4	(0)
1985	Exeter City	5	(0)
1985–1986	Bristol Rovers	14	(1)
1986	Swansea City	11	(0)
Total		199	(6)

International career
1978	Wales U21	1	(0)
- * Club domestic league appearances and goals

Ian Davies (born 29 March 1957) is an English former professional footballer who played as a left back. Active in both England and the United States, Davies made nearly 200 career appearances.

== Career ==
Born in Bristol, Davies began his career with the youth team of Norwich City, and made his debut for the senior team in the Football League during the 1973–1974 season. While at Norwich, Davies spent a loan spell in the North American Soccer League with the Detroit Express. After leaving Norwich in 1979, Davies also played in the Football League for Newcastle United, Manchester City, Bury, Brentford, Cambridge United, Carlisle United, Exeter City, Bristol Rovers and Swansea City, before retiring due to injury in 1986.
