= Bill Roffey =

English footballer (born 1954)

Personal information
- Full name: William Robert Roffey
- Date of birth: 6 February 1954 (age 72)
- Place of birth: Stepney, England
- Height: 5 ft 11 in (1.80 m)
- Position: Defender

Youth career
- ?–1971: Crystal Palace

Senior career*
Years	Team	Apps	(Gls)
1971–1973	Crystal Palace	24	(0)
1973–1984	Leyton Orient	328	(8)
1983–1984	→ Brentford (loan)	13	(1)
1984–1986	Millwall	37	(2)
1988	Barnet	1	(0)
1988–1991	Leixões		
1991–1992	Margate	38	(3)
1992–1994	Canterbury City		
1994–1995	Margate	35	(0)
1995–1996	Tonbridge Angels		

Managerial career
- 1994: Canterbury City (Player-manager)
- 1994–1995: Margate (Player-manager)
- 1995–1997: Tonbridge Angels (Player-manager)
- * Club domestic league appearances and goals

William Robert Roffey (6 February 1954) is an English former footballer, who played as a defender.

== League career ==
Roffey was born Stepney, Greater London. He began his youth career at Crystal Palace signing professionally in May 1971. In October 1973, he moved on to Leyton Orient, for whom he made 328 appearances in eleven years. Whilst at Orient, Roffey was part of the side that reached the FA Cup semi final in 1978, where the team lost 3–0 to Arsenal at Stamford Bridge. After a loan period at Brentford in 1984, (13 games, one goal), he finished his Football League career at Millwall, for whom he made 37 appearances over the next two seasons scoring twice. Roffey made a total of 401 league appearances between 1972 and 1986.

== Later career ==
Roffey then had a spell away from football before moving into non-league football with Barnet in 1988, (two appearances). He then spent three seasons with Leixões of Portugal before retiring at the end of the 1990–91 season. However, in 1991, Roffey joined former Leyton Orient playing colleague, Tommy Taylor, then manager at Margate, and went on to make 38 appearances in season 1991–92, scoring three times. For 1992–93, Roffey joined Canterbury City where he stayed until 1994 including a brief stint as player-manager. He then returned to Margate as manager but despite having retired after leaving Canterbury City, continued as a player, making 35 appearances in season 1994–95, without scoring. In 1995 Roffey moved to Tonbridge Angels where he initially worked as assistant-manager alongside Phil Emblem. However, during the season, Roffey replaced Emblem as manager and also made playing appearances, mainly as a substitute. Roffey continued to serve Tonbridge as manager until October 1997 when he resigned and ended his involvement with football.
