= Brian Greenaway =

English footballer

Personal information
- Full name: Brian Greenaway
- Date of birth: 26 September 1957 (age 69)
- Place of birth: Fulham, England
- Position: Winger

Youth career
- –1975: Fulham

Senior career*
Years	Team	Apps	(Gls)
1975–1982	Fulham	68	(8)
1982–1983	APOEL		
1983–1987	Wealdstone		
- Dagenham
- Tooting & Mitcham United
1988–1989	Slough Town	16	(2)
- Wycombe Wanderers
- Staines Town
- * Club domestic league appearances and goals

Brian Greenaway (born 26 September 1957) was an English professional footballer who played as a winger in the Football League for Fulham. He later played in Cyprus and in non-League football.

== Personal life ==
Greenaway worked as a painter and decorator and a chauffeur.

== Career statistics ==
Appearances and goals by club, season and competition
Club	Season	League			National Cup		League Cup		Other		Total	
Club	Season	Division	Apps	Goals	Apps	Goals	Apps	Goals	Apps	Goals	Apps	Goals
Fulham	1976–77	Second Division	4	0	0	0	0	0	―		4	0
Fulham	1977–78	Second Division	23	2	1	0	0	0	―		24	2
Fulham	1978–79	Second Division	14	3	0	0	0	0	―		14	3
Fulham	1979–80	Second Division	8	1	1	0	0	0	―		10	2
Fulham	1980–81	Third Division	19	2	4	1	2	0	―		25	3
Fulham	Total		68	8	6	1	2	0	―		76	9
Slough Town	1988–89	Isthmian League Premier Division	15	2	―		―		4 (Note: 2 appearances in FA Trophy, 2 appearances in Berks & Bucks Senior Cup)	0	19	2
Slough Town	1989–90	Isthmian League Premier Division	1	0	1	0	―		―		2	0
Slough Town	Total		16	2	1	0	―		4	0	21	2
Career total			84	10	7	0	2	0	4	0	97	11

== Honours ==
Wealdstone

- Alliance Premier League: 1984–85
- FA Trophy: 1984–85
