= Jimmy Holmes (footballer, born 1953) =

Irish footballer

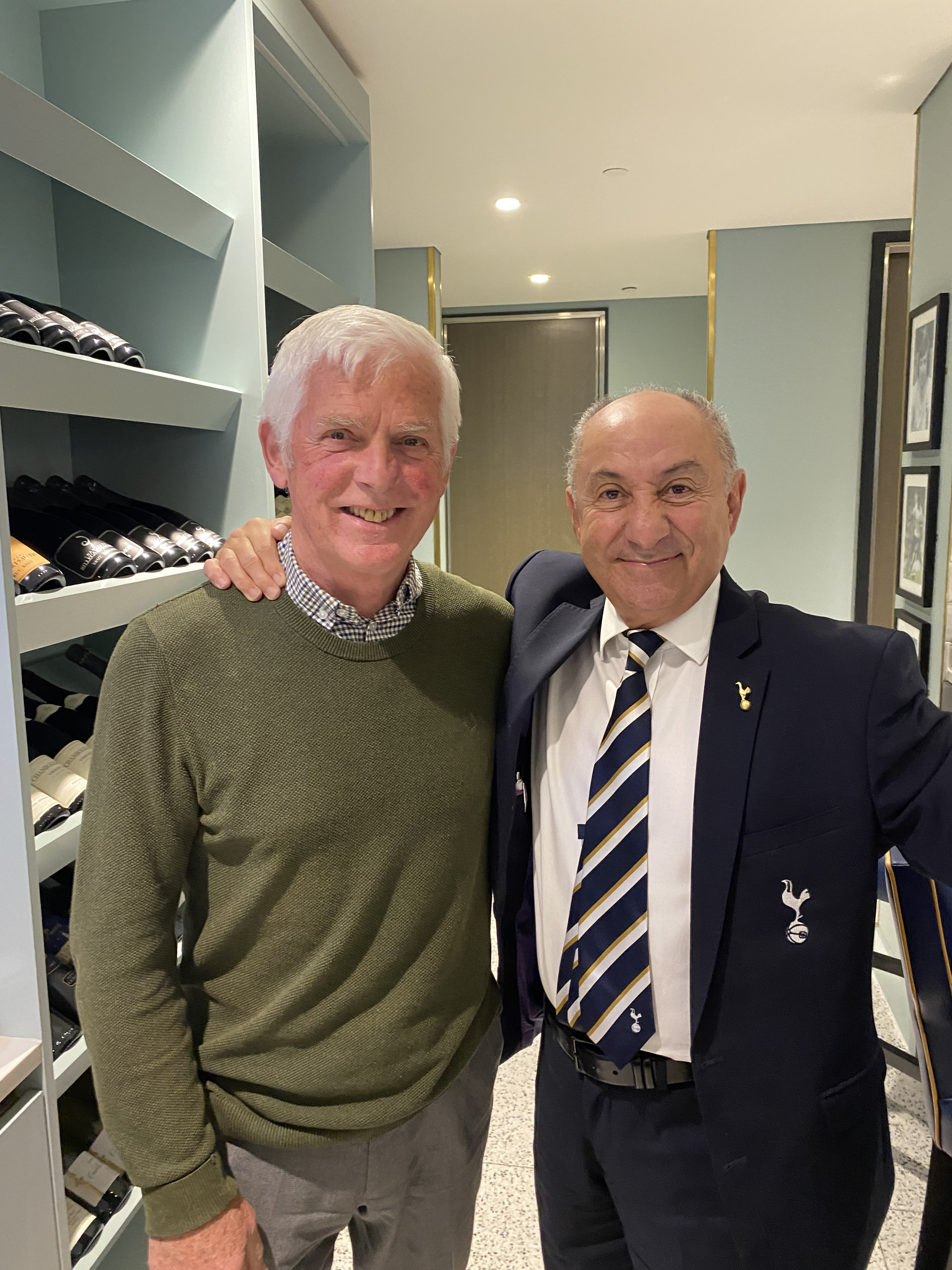
- Jimmy Holmes reuniting with Osvaldo Ardiles, his former Spurs teammate after Tottenham’s 4-1 win over West Ham United in October 2024.

Personal information
- Full name: James Paul Holmes
- Date of birth: 11 November 1953 (age 72)
- Place of birth: Dublin, Ireland
- Height: 5 ft 10 in (1.78 m)
- Position: Defender

Youth career
- St John Bosco
- 1970–1971: Coventry City

Senior career*
Years	Team	Apps	(Gls)
1970–1977	Coventry City	128	(6)
1977–1981	Tottenham Hotspur	81	(2)
1981–1982	Vancouver Whitecaps	17	(0)
1982–1983	Leicester City	2	(0)
1983	Brentford	4	(0)
1983	Torquay United	25	(3)
1983–1986	Peterborough United	49	(7)
1985–1987	Nuneaton Borough	39	(4)
1987	Leicester United		
1987–1989	Hitchin Town		
1989–1990	Bedworth United		
1990	Nuneaton Borough		

International career
1971–1981	Republic of Ireland	30	(1)

Managerial career
- 1985–1987: Nuneaton Borough (player-manager)
- 1987–1989: Hitchin Town (player-manager)
- 1989–1990: Bedworth United (player-manager)
- * Club domestic league appearances and goals

James Paul Holmes (born 11 November 1953) is an Irish former professional footballer. Hailing from Meath Square in The Liberties, he won 30 full international caps for the Republic of Ireland, scoring once.

== Career ==
Holmes, a left-back, began his career with St. John Bosco. He joined Coventry City as apprentice and was a member of the FA Youth Cup Final side in 1970. He turned professional in November 1970 and became the Republic of Ireland's youngest ever full international at 17 years, 200 days when he came on as a 74th-minute substitute for Don Givens in the 4–1 defeat in the European Championship Qualifier against Austria at Dalymount Park on 30 May 1971.

He made his league debut later that year in the home game against Leicester City on 4 December and gradually established himself in the Coventry first team. In March 1977, after 8 goals in 143 games for Coventry, he moved to Tottenham Hotspur for a fee of £120,000. A broken leg ended his career at White Hart Lane after 92 games, in which he scored twice. While on international duty, Jimmy broke his leg and complications arose in the setting of the leg.

In February 1981, the Vancouver Whitecaps of the North American Soccer League purchased his contract for £100,000. However, he played only seventeen games over two seasons. During this time he made one final appearance in the Irish national side. In October 1982 he returned to the UK, joining Leicester City on a free transfer, but played only twice before a free transfer took him to Brentford in February 1983. A month later, another free transfer took him to Torquay United, Holmes playing 25 games (3 goals) for Bruce Rioch's side. In November 1983 he moved to Peterborough United, scoring 7 times in 60 games before ending his league career.

He enjoyed a testimonial match in 1985 at Dalymount Park, when an Irish XI beat a Glenn Hoddle XI.

He later became a police officer in the Midlands and works as a chauffeur. As a police officer, he was once called into duty again while on police duty at Coventry City's Highfield Road. When one of the players for a testimonial did not show, Jimmy stepped into the fray. In August 2007 he was formally commended for his bravery in July 2006. He later retired in 2020, during COVID-19.

== International career ==
Jimmy Holmes had quite a remarkable career for Ireland, appearing 30 times around the world and facing footballing greats such as Lev Yashin, Michel Platini and even Péle. He holds the record for the youngest player ever to play for Ireland, in a 4-1 defeat to Austria in May of 1971. His only goal for Eíre was in a 3-0 dominant victory over Norway.

#	Date	Venue	Opponent	Score	Competition
1	30 May 1971	Dalymount Park, Dublin	Austria	1–4	UEFA Euro 1972 Qualifier
2	15 Nov 1972	Dalymount Park, Dublin	France	2–1	1974 FIFA World Cup Qualifier
3	13 May 1973	Central Lenin Stadium, Moscow	Soviet Union	0–1	1974 FIFA World Cup Qualifier
4	16 May 1973	Olympic Stadium, Wrocław	Poland	0–2	Friendly
5	19 May 1973	Parc des Princes, Paris	France	1–1	1974 FIFA World Cup Qualifier
6	6 Jun 1973	Ullevaal Stadion, Oslo	Norway	1–1	Friendly
7	21 Oct 1973	Dalymount Park, Dublin	Poland	1–0	Friendly
8	5 May 1974	Maracanã Stadium, Rio de Janeiro	Brazil	1–2	Friendly
9	30 Oct 1974	Dalymount Park, Dublin	Soviet Union	3–0	UEFA Euro 1976 Qualifier
10	21 May 1975	Wankdorf Stadium, Bern	Switzerland	0–1	UEFA Euro 1976 Qualifier
11	29 Oct 1975	Dalymount Park, Dublin	Turkey	4–0	UEFA Euro 1976 Qualifier
12	24 Mar 1976	Dalymount Park, Dublin	Norway	3–0	Friendly
13	26 May 1976	Stadion Miejski, Poznań	Poland	0–2	Friendly
14	8 Sep 1976	Wembley Stadium, London	England	1–1	Friendly
15	13 Oct 1976	19 Mayıs Stadium, Ankara	Turkey	3–3	Friendly
16	17 Nov 1976	Parc des Princes, Paris	France	0–2	1978 FIFA World Cup Qualifier
17	9 Feb 1977	Dalymount Park, Dublin	Spain	0–1	Friendly
18	30 Mar 1977	Dalymount Park, Dublin	France	1–0	1978 FIFA World Cup Qualifier
19	24 Apr 1977	Dalymount Park, Dublin	Poland	0–0	Friendly
20	1 Jun 1977	Vasil Levski National Stadium, Sofia	Bulgaria	1–2	1978 FIFA World Cup Qualifier
21	12 Oct 1977	Dalymount Park, Dublin	Bulgaria	0–0	1978 FIFA World Cup Qualifier
22	5 Apr 1978	Dalymount Park, Dublin	Turkey	4–2	Friendly
23	12 Apr 1978	Stadion Śląski, Chorzów	Poland	0–3	Friendly
24	21 May 1978	Ullevaal Stadion, Oslo	Norway	0–0	Friendly
25	24 May 1978	Idrætsparken, Copenhagen	Denmark	3–3	UEFA Euro 1980 Qualifier
26	20 Sep 1978	Dalymount Park, Dublin	Northern Ireland	0–0	UEFA Euro 1980 Qualifier
27	25 Oct 1978	Dalymount Park, Dublin	England	1–1	UEFA Euro 1980 Qualifier
28	2 May 1979	Dalymount Park, Dublin	Denmark	2–0	UEFA Euro 1980 Qualifier
29	19 May 1979	Vasil Levski National Stadium, Sofia	Bulgaria	0–1	UEFA Euro 1980 Qualifier
30	24 Feb 1981	Dalymount Park, Dublin	Wales	1–3	Friendly

== FA Cup career ==
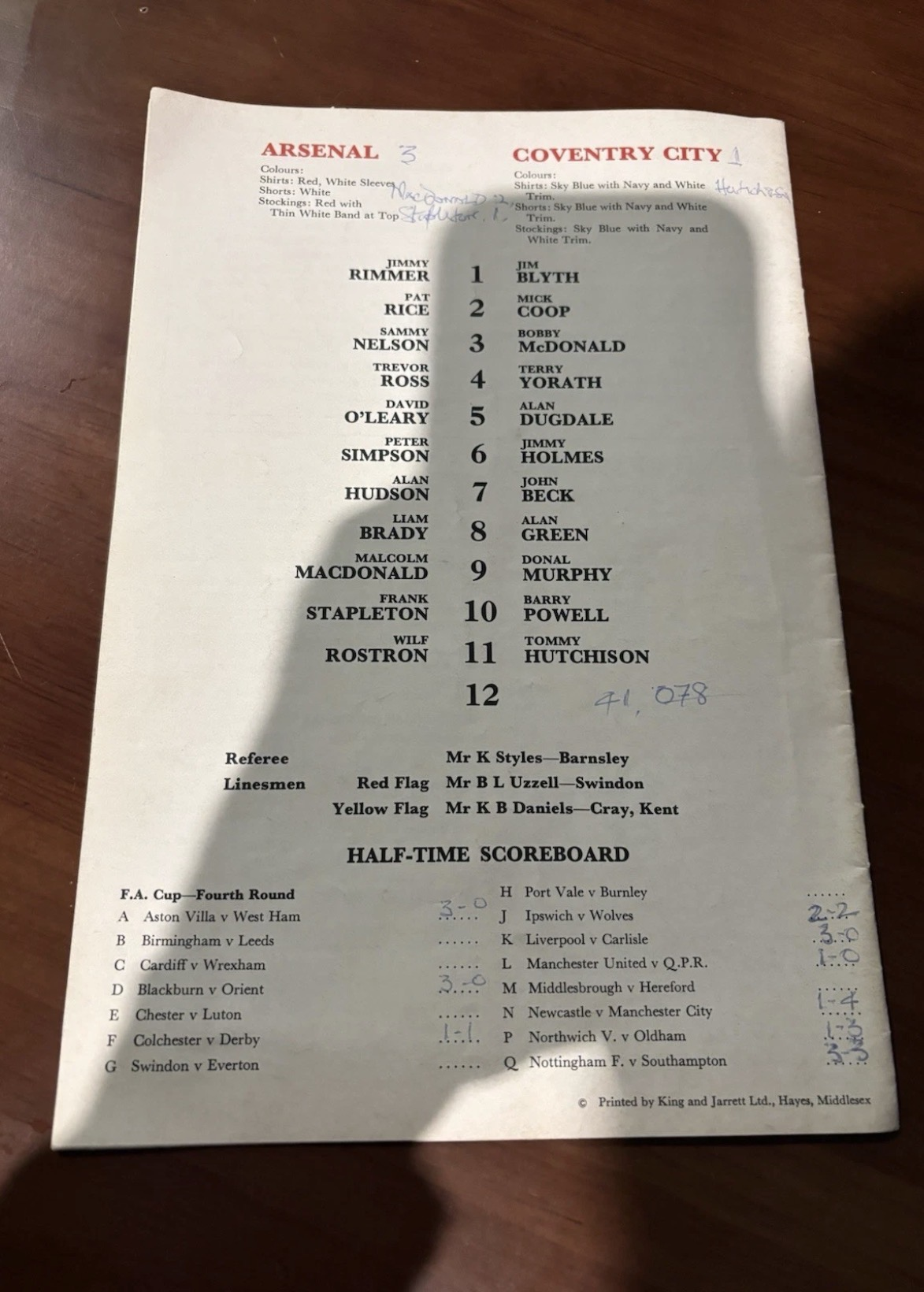
Holmes featuring on a programme in his game vs Arsenal

During his career, Jimmy Holmes appeared regularly in the FA Cup for both Coventry City and Tottenham Hotspur. While at Coventry, he played in several campaigns, featuring in victories over Stoke City, Bristol City, and Millwall, as well as defeats to Arsenal, Manchester City, and Newcastle United. Several ties required replays, including matches against Sheffield Wednesday, Derby County, and Queens Park Rangers. After transferring to Tottenham Hotspur for the 1977–78 season, Holmes was involved in wins against Altrincham, Wrexham, and Oldham Athletic, before Tottenham’s run was ended by Manchester United. Holmes’ FA Cup career thus included a series of notable cup runs that ended in knockout fixtures against top-flight opposition.

Season	Club	Opponent	Score	Round	Venue
1973–74	Coventry City	Sheffield Wednesday	0–0		Hillsborough
1973–74	Coventry City	Sheffield Wednesday	3–1		Highfield Road
1973–74	Coventry City	Derby County	0–0		Highfield Road
1973–74	Coventry City	Derby County	1–0		Baseball Ground
1973–74	Coventry City	Queens Park Rangers	0–0		Highfield Road
1973–74	Coventry City	Queens Park Rangers	2–3		Loftus Road
1974–75	Coventry City	Norwich City	2–0		Highfield Road
1974–75	Coventry City	Arsenal	1–1		Highfield Road
1974–75	Coventry City	Arsenal	0–3		Highbury
1975–76	Coventry City	Bristol City	2–1		Highfield Road
1975–76	Coventry City	Newcastle United	1–1		Highfield Road
1975–76	Coventry City	Newcastle United	0–5		St James’ Park
1976–77	Coventry City	Millwall	1–0		Highfield Road
1976–77	Coventry City	Arsenal	1–3		Highbury
1977–78	Tottenham Hotspur	Altrincham	1–1		White Hart Lane
1977–78	Tottenham Hotspur	Altrincham	0–3		Moss Lane
1977–78	Tottenham Hotspur	Wrexham	3–3		White Hart Lane
1977–78	Tottenham Hotspur	Wrexham	3–2		Racecourse Ground
1977–78	Tottenham Hotspur	Oldham Athletic	0–1		Boundary Park
1977–78	Tottenham Hotspur	Manchester United	1–1		White Hart Lane
1977–78	Tottenham Hotspur	Manchester United	0–2		Old Trafford
1982–83	Torquay United	Colchester United	2–0		Layer Road
1982–83	Torquay United	Oxford United	1–1		Manor Ground
1982–83	Torquay United	Oxford United	2–1		Plainmoor
1982–83	Torquay United	Sheffield Wednesday	2–3		Plainmoor
1984–85	Peterborough United	Cambridge United	2–0		Abbey Stadium
1984–85	Peterborough United	Dagenham	0–1		London Road
1985–86	Peterborough United	Bishop's Stortford	2–2		Woodside Park
1985–86	Peterborough United	Bishop's Stortford	3–0		London Road
1986–87	Nuneaton Borough	Rochdale	0–3		Liberty Ground

== League Cup career ==
Jimmy Holmes featured in the League Cup during the 1970s while representing Coventry City and later Tottenham Hotspur. With Coventry City, he appeared in fixtures against Burnley, Hartlepool United, Birmingham City, Darlington, Bristol City, Stoke City, Manchester City, Ipswich Town, Bolton Wanderers, Mansfield Town, Nottingham Forest, and Everton. Following his move to Tottenham Hotspur, he featured in League Cup matches against Wimbledon and Coventry City. His appearances came across several seasons of knockout competition in English football’s secondary domestic cup.

Season	Club	Opponent	Score	Round	Venue
1971–72	Coventry City	Burnley	0–1		Highfield Road
1972–73	Coventry City	Hartlepool United	1–0		Highfield Road
1972–73	Coventry City	Birmingham City	1–2		St Andrew's
1973–74	Coventry City	Darlington	5–1		Highfield Road
1973–74	Coventry City	Bristol City	2–2		Ashton Gate
1973–74	Coventry City	Bristol City	2–1		Highfield Road
1973–74	Coventry City	Stoke City	2–1		Highfield Road
1973–74	Coventry City	Manchester City	2–2		Highfield Road
1973–74	Coventry City	Manchester City	2–4		Maine Road
1974–75	Coventry City	Ipswich Town	1–2		Highfield Road
1975–76	Coventry City	Bolton Wanderers	3–1		Burnden Park
1975–76	Coventry City	Mansfield Town	0–2		Field Mill
1976–77	Coventry City	Bristol City	1–0		Ashton Gate
1976–77	Coventry City	Nottingham Forest	3–0		City Ground
1976–77	Coventry City	Everton	0–3		Goodison Park
1977–78	Tottenham Hotspur	Wimbledon	4–0		White Hart Lane
1977–78	Tottenham Hotspur	Coventry City	2–3		White Hart Lane
1982–83	Torquay United	Bristol Rovers	2–2		Eastville Stadium
1982–83	Torquay United	Bristol Rovers	0–4		Plainmoor
1983–84	Torquay United	Newport County	1–0		Plainmoor
1983–84	Torquay United	Manchester City	0–0		Plainmoor
1983–84	Torquay United	Manchester City	0–6		Maine Road
1984–85	Peterborough United	Sheffield United	0–1		Bramall Lane
1984–85	Peterborough United	Sheffield United	2–2		London Road
1985–86	Peterborough United	Northampton Town	0–0		London Road
1985–86	Peterborough United	Northampton Town	0–2		Sixfields

== Career abroad ==
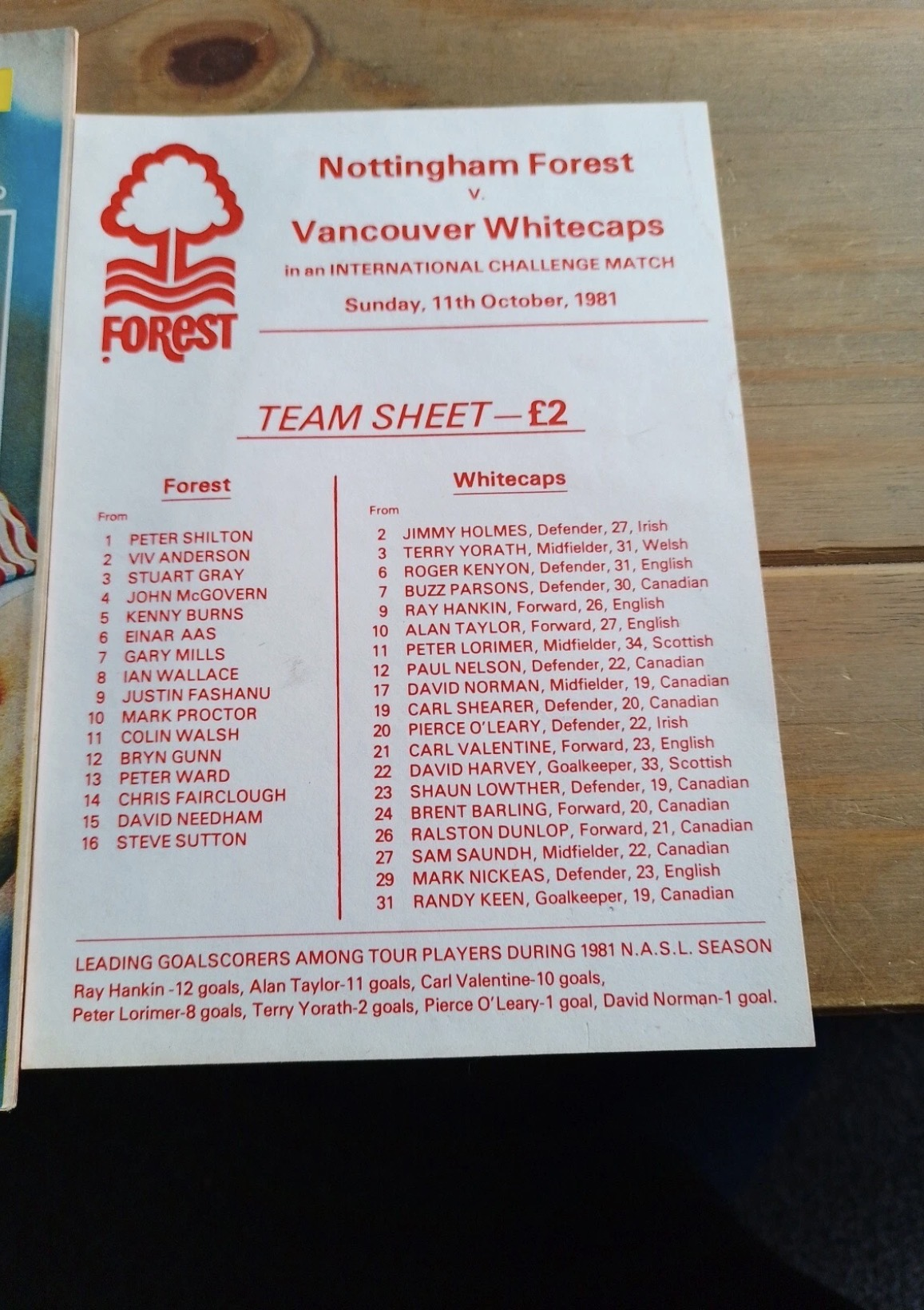
Holmes featured on the programme between Nottingham Forest

Jimmy played 17 games for Vancouver Whitecaps. Jimmy faced many teams in the NASL, such as New York Cosmos and Montreal Manic, but many of these teams are now defunct. He also faced teams like SSC Napoli and Sparta Rotterdam. He joined Whitecaps with his Coventry teammate Terry Yorath, and left in 1982 to join Leicester City for his spell at the midlands side. Jimmy played in both Indoor and Outdoor NASL, with indoor games having higher scores as it was more similar to Futsal.

Season	Opponent	Score	Venue	Competition
1981	Sparta Rotterdam	4-0	Unknown Venue	Unknown Competition
1981	Napoli	1-1	Unknown Venue	Unknown Competition
1981	Nottingham Forest	2-2	City Ground	International Challenge Match
1982	Chicago Sting	3–2	Unknown Venue	NASL
1982	New York Cosmos	0–2	Unknown Venue	NASL
1982	Dallas Tornado	3–2	Unknown Venue	NASL
1982	Montreal Manic	1–2	Unknown Venue	NASL
1982	San Diego Sockers	5-1	Unknown Venue	NASL
1982	San Diego Sockers	1-0	Unknown Venue	NASL
1982	San Diego Sockers	2-1	Unknown Venue	NASL
1981	California Surf	0-3	Unknown Venue	Indoor NASL
1981	California Surf	8-5	Unknown Venue	Indoor NASL
1981	California Surf	4-0	Unknown Venue	Indoor NASL
1981	Edmonton Drillers	9-7	Unknown Venue	Indoor NASL
1981	Edmonton Drillers	6-4	Unknown Venue	Indoor NASL
1982	San Diego Sockers	4-3	Unknown Venue	Indoor NASL
1982	San Diego Sockers	8-4	Unknown Venue	Indoor NASL
