= Bill Garner (footballer) =

English footballer

Personal information
- Full name: William David Garner
- Date of birth: 14 December 1947 (age 78)
- Place of birth: Leicester, England
- Position: Centre forward

Senior career*
Years	Team	Apps	(Gls)
–	Leicester Victoria		
–	Loughborough United		
196x–1966	Midland Athletic		
1966–1967	Notts County	2	(0)
–	Loughborough United		
196x–1969	Dunstable Town		
1969	Bedford Town		
1969–1972	Southend United	102	(41)
1972–1978	Chelsea	105	(31)
1978–1980	Cambridge United	24	(3)
1980–1983	Chelmsford City		
1983–1984	Brentford	3	(1)
- * Club domestic league appearances and goals

William David Garner (born 14 December 1947) is an English former footballer born in Leicester, who played in the Football League for Notts County, Southend United, Chelsea, Cambridge United and Brentford.

A bustling centre-forward, Garner started his career in local football in the Leicester area before signing professional forms with Notts County. After only two league appearances he returned to Loughborough United, then signed for Southern League club Dunstable Town, for whom he scored 25 goals, and then Bedford Town, who sold him to Southend United in November 1969, for a fee of £12,000. He scored 47 goals in 111 games for Southend, and was their top scorer and Player of the Season in 1971–72. After impressing during a League Cup match against Chelsea in 1972, he signed for the west Londoners three days later for £100,000.

Garner's time at Chelsea was hindered by the overall decline of the side, culminating in relegation to the Second Division in 1975, as well as his own injury problems and loss of form. He made a total of 119 appearances for Chelsea, scoring 36 goals. He signed for Cambridge United on a free transfer in 1978. He left Cambridge in 1980 and ended his career with stints at Chelmsford City and Brentford. He lived in the Southend Area for many years and also played a good level of club cricket with Southend CC as a hard hitting allrounder who was also an exceptional fielder and great will to win.
