= Peter Caswell =

English footballer

Personal information
- Full name: Peter Donald Caswell
- Date of birth: 16 January 1957 (age 69)
- Place of birth: Leatherhead, England
- Position: Goalkeeper

Senior career*
Years	Team	Apps	(Gls)
1976–1978	Crystal Palace	3	(0)
1978–1979	Crewe Alexandra	22	(0)
1979–1980	Telford United	22	(?)
- * Club domestic league appearances and goals

Peter Donald Caswell (born 16 January 1957 in Leatherhead) is an English former professional footballer who played in the Football League as a goalkeeper.
