= Les Strong =

English footballer

Personal information
- Full name: Leslie Strong
- Date of birth: 3 July 1953 (age 73)
- Place of birth: Lambeth, England
- Position: Left back

Youth career
- 1969: Fulham

Senior career*
Years	Team	Apps	(Gls)
1972–1983	Fulham	372	(5)
1982–1983	→ Brentford (loan)	5	(0)
1983–1984	Crystal Palace	7	(0)
1984–1985	Rochdale	1	(0)
Total		385	(5)

Managerial career
- 1991–1994: Anguilla
- * Club domestic league appearances and goals

Leslie Strong (born 3 July 1953) is an English former footballer who played as a left back. He spent the majority of his career playing for Fulham, where he began as a youth player in 1969 under the guidance of World Cup winner George Cohen. Between 1972 and 1983, Strong made 427 appearances, including 373 League games, putting him ninth in the all time Fulham appearance list. After appearing in all 57 regular-season games, Strong missed the 1975 FA Cup final against West Ham United, due to injury.

In the 1981–82 season, manager Malcolm Macdonald made Strong the Fulham club captain and under his leadership, Fulham were promoted to the Second Division. In 1981, Strong was granted a testimonial season, for his 10 years of service, culminating in a match against England. After a brief loan to Brentford and a single season at Crystal Palace, he ended his career with a single game for Rochdale. Strong retired in 1985. He went on to manage the Anguilla national football team and Petite Rivière Noire FC of the Mauritian League. Under his management, they won the Mauritian Cup for the first time in 2007, thus qualifying for the African cup winners cup.

Since 2002, Strong has been a popular match day host in Fulham's hospitality lounges.

Les is a qualified pilot and is married to Laura, who plays for England at walking football, they have a daughter Lilly, who is studying film animation in Bournemouth.
