= Swinburne (surname) =

Swinburne or Swinburn is an English surname. Notable people with the surname include the following:

== Swinburn ==
- Sir Richard Swinburn (1937–2017), British Lieutenant General, Commander of the UK Field Army
- Wally Swinburn, (born 1937), Horse racing jockey
- Walter Swinburn (1961–2016), British racing jockey and trainer, son of Wally Swinburn

== Swinburne ==
- Alan Swinburne (born 1946), English footballer
- Algernon Charles Swinburne, English poet
- George Swinburne, Australian engineer, politician and public man.
- Henry Swinburne, 18th century British traveller and author
- Henry Swinburne (lawyer), 16th century English ecclesiastical lawyer and writer
- Sir James Swinburne, 9th Baronet, Northumbrian electrical innovator and industrialist
- John Swinburne (disambiguation), multiple people
- Kay Swinburne, MEP for Wales (2009–)
- Louis Judson Swinburne (1855–1887), American writer
- Lyn Swinburne (born 1952), founder of Breast Cancer Network Australia
- Nora Swinburne, actress
- Richard Swinburne, philosopher of religion
- Robert Swinburne (disambiguation)
- Sandy Swinburne, American politician
- Thomas Thackeray Swinburne, a 20th-century American poet from Rochester, New York
- Tom Swinburne (1915–1969), English footballer
- Trevor Swinburne (born 1953), English footballer
- William Swinburne (locomotive builder), 19th century American steam locomotive manufacturer
- William T. Swinburne (1847–1928), US rear admiral and one-time Commander-in-Chief of the US Pacific Fleet.
- The Swinburne baronets
