= John Swinburne =

John Swinburne may refer to:

- John Swinburne (by 1526-at least 1577), MP for Northumberland (UK Parliament constituency)
- John Swinburne (New York politician) (1820–1889), American legislator and physician
- Sir John Swinburne, 6th Baronet (1762–1860) English politician and patron of the arts
- Sir John Swinburne, 7th Baronet (1831–1914), English legislator, High Sheriff of Northumberland, grandson of Sir John Swinburne, 6th Baronet
- John Swinburne (Member of Scottish Parliament) (1930–2017), American-born founder of Scottish Senior Citizens Unity Party (SSCUP)
- John Swinburne (cricketer) (1939–2011), English cricketer

== See also ==
- Swinburne baronets, five of whom were named John Swinburne
- Swinburne (disambiguation)
