= Howdah pistol =

19th-century handgun used in colonies of the British Empire

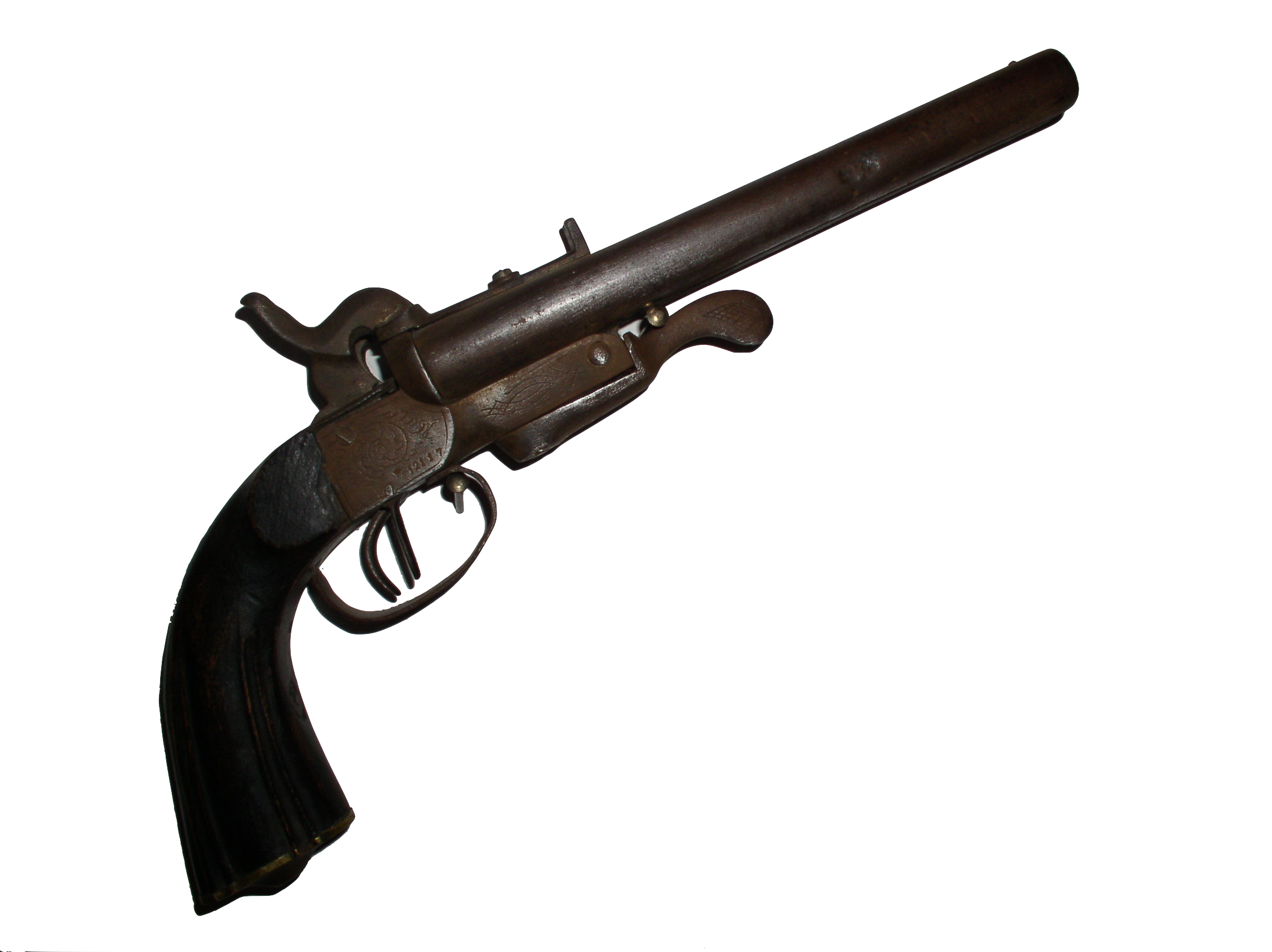
Double-barrel .50 caliber (13mm) howdah pistol made in Germany

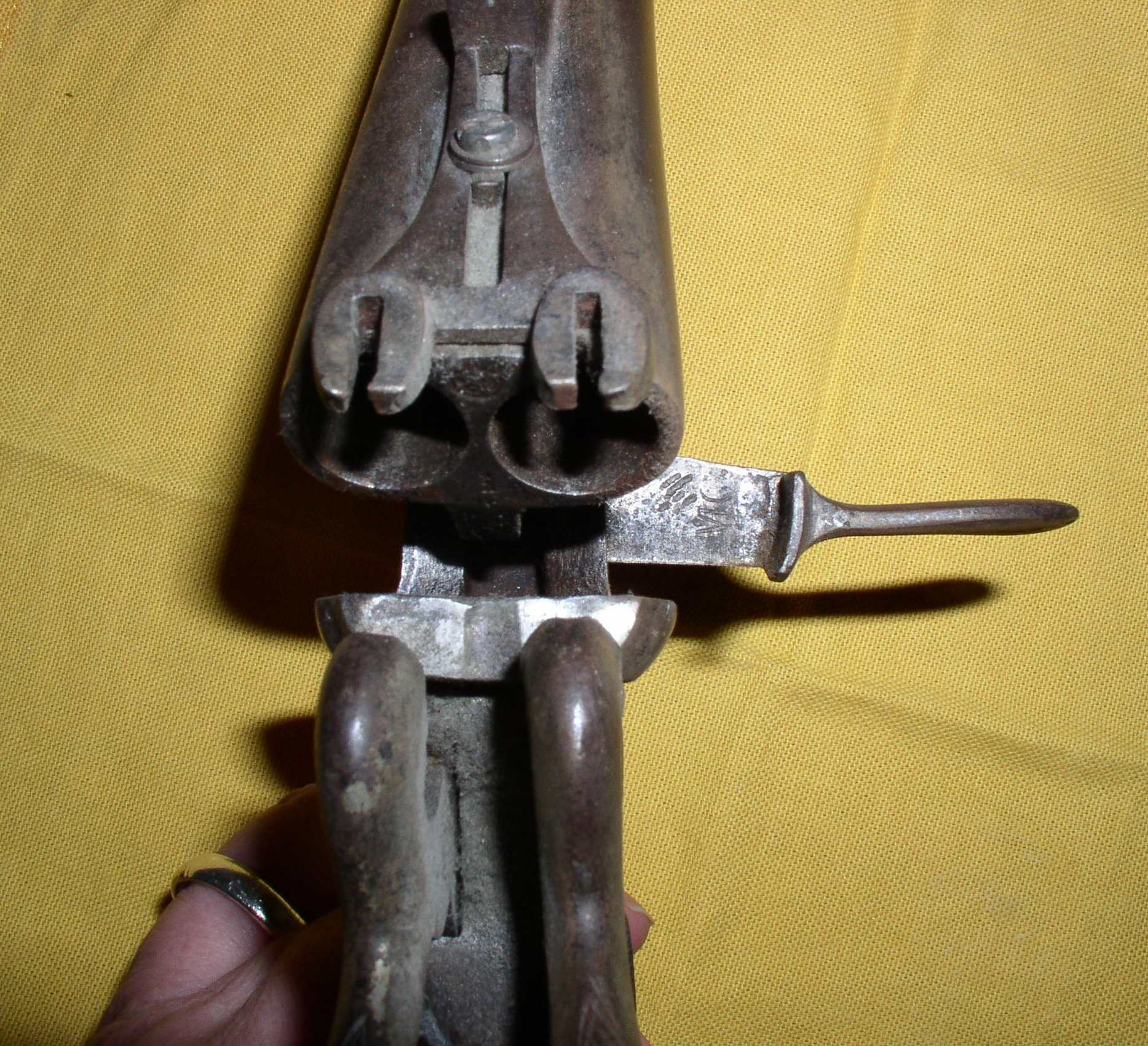
Breech of the same pistol open for loading. This particular weapon was made for a left-handed user.

The howdah pistol was a large-calibre handgun, often with two or four barrels, used in Africa and India from the beginning of the nineteenth century and into the early twentieth century during the British Empire era. It was intended for defence against lions, tigers and other dangerous wild animals that might be encountered in remote areas. Multi-barreled breech-loading designs were later favoured over contemporary revolvers, due to their higher velocity and faster reloading potential.

== Terminology ==
The term "howdah pistol" comes from the howdah, a large platform mounted on the back of an elephant. Hunters, particularly in British Raj India, used howdahs as a platform for hunting, and needed large-calibre side-arms for protection against close quarters animal attacks. The practice of hunting from the howdah basket on top of an Asian elephant was first made popular by the East India Company during the 1790s. The early howdah pistols were flintlock designs of similar specification to the military issue musket pistol, and it was not until about 60 years later that percussion models in single or double barrel configuration were seen. By the 1890s and early 1900s cartridge-firing and fully rifled howdah pistols were standard.

== 19th century ==
The first breech-loading howdah pistols were little more than sawn-off rifles, typically in .577 Snider or .577/450 Martini–Henry calibre. This was practical in that the huntsman could use the same, powerful, ammunition in rifle and pistol. Later English firearms makers manufactured specially designed howdah pistols in both rifle calibres and standard pistol calibres such as .455 Webley and .476 Enfield; consequently the term "howdah pistol" is often applied to a number of English multi-barrelled handguns including the Lancaster pistol (available in several calibres from .380" to .577"), and various .577-calibre revolvers produced in England and Europe for a brief time in the mid-late 19th century. A howdah pistol with its closed breech fires at a substantially higher velocity than a revolver of the same calibre, because a revolver suffers from gas leakage at the gap between the cylinder and the barrel.

Although howdah pistols were originally intended for emergency defence against dangerous animals in Africa and India, British military officers later carried them for personal protection and even battlefield use. By the late 19th century, top-break revolvers in more practical calibres such as .455 Webley had become widespread, removing much of the traditional market for howdah pistols.

== See also ==
- Animal attacks
- Ithaca Auto & Burglar gun
- Lancaster pistol
- List of multiple-barrel firearms
- Lupara
- TP-82 Cosmonaut survival pistol

== Bibliography ==
- Maze, Robert J. (2002). Howdah to High Power. Tucson, Arizona: Excalibur Publications. ISBN 1-880677-17-2.
- Peterson, Harold L. (1971). The great guns. New York, Feltham: Ridge Press, Hamlyn. ISBN 0-600-33890-8.
