= Swinburne (disambiguation) =

Algernon Charles Swinburne (1837–1909) was an English poet and writer.

Swinburne or Swinburn may also refer to:

== Education ==
- Swinburne Film and Television School, a former film school (1966–1991) in Melbourne, Australia
- Swinburne Senior Secondary College, Melbourne, Australia
- Swinburne University of Technology, Melbourne, Australia
- Swinburne University of Technology Sarawak Campus, Kuching, Malaysia

== People ==
- Swinburne (surname), includes Swinburn
- Swinburne Hale (1884–1937), American lawyer, poet, and socialist
- Swinburne Lestrade (fl. 1995–2000), Dominican economist

== Places ==
- Swinburne, Free State, South Africa, a village
- Swinburne Ice Shelf, Antarctica
- Swinburne Island, New York City, United States

== Other uses ==
- Swinburne baronets, a title in the Peerage of England
- Swinburn-Henry rifle
