= Lancaster pistol =

English multi-barrelled pistol

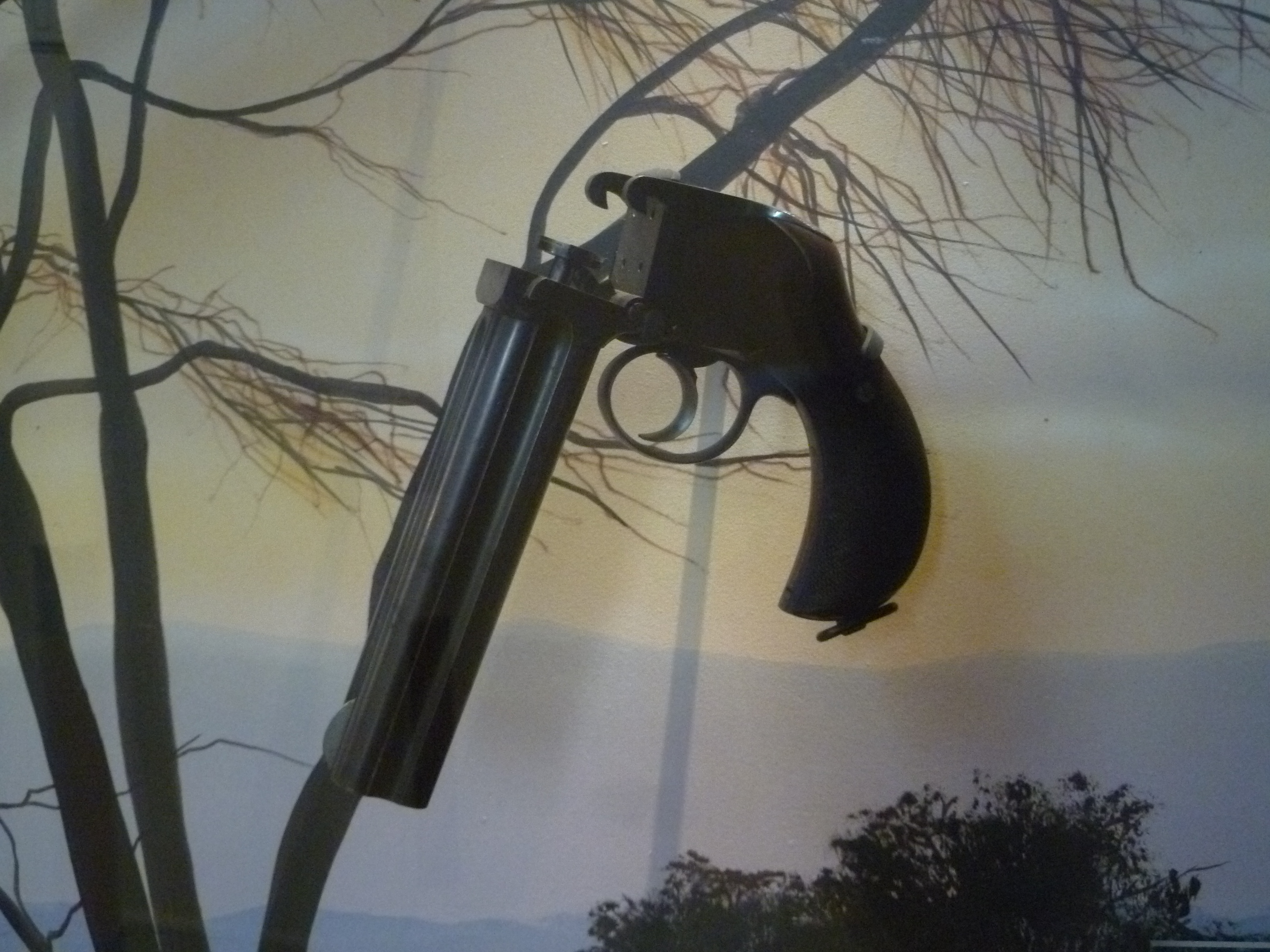
- Break action Lancaster pistol on display at the Royal Armouries Museum in Leeds
- Type: Multi-barrel pistol
- Place of origin: United Kingdom

Service history
- Wars: Anglo-Zulu War; First Boer War; Mahdist War; Second Boer War

Production history
- Designer: Charles W. Lancaster and Henry Thorn
- Designed: c. 1860
- Produced: mid to late 19th century

Specifications
- Cartridge: .38 S&W.450 Adams.455 Webley.476 Enfield.577 Snider
- Calibre: .380 inch.450 inch.455 inch.577 inch
- Barrels: 2 or 4
- Action: Break-action, double action only, revolving striker
- Feed system: one cartridge in each barrel

The Lancaster pistol is a multi-barrelled handgun produced in 2 and 4 barrel configurations in England during the mid to late 19th century. It is chambered in a variety of centrefire pistol calibres—chiefly .38 S&W, .450 Adams, .455 Webley, .476 Enfield and .577 Snider, though most productions were in .455 Webley and .476 Enfield. The designer, London gunsmith Charles William Lancaster, began his career in 1847 after the death of his father, Charles Lancaster Senior. Charles Lancaster received a patent for oval bore rifling, a form of rifling which contains two opposing twisted grooves on each side of the barrel, which he used in Lancaster pistols.

== Description ==
The Lancaster is a modernized version of prior howdah pistols, popular in the mid 19th century. Unlike these earlier guns which had percussion cap ignition, the Lancaster was chambered for the more modern center-fire brass cartridges. The unique oval rifling also enabled it to fire .410 shotgun shells. It had a faster rate of fire than the standard-issue Adams revolver and was often fitted with a Tranter-type trigger to overcome the heavy pull of the revolving striker, a result of productions containing a double-action trigger.

Classified as a Howdah pistol, the Lancaster saw popularity with British officers in India and Africa during the British Raj, owing to its faster rate of fire and increased reliability over contemporary revolvers. It was highly prized by hunters and explorers for close range defense against big game, such as tigers or cape buffalo. Unlike contemporary revolvers, it did not leak gas when fired since there was no gap between the chamber and the barrel. One rare variant, made for the Maharajah of Rewa as a hunting weapon, took the form of a four barreled rifle.

=== Use in Sudan ===
Its ammunition had greater stopping power than the contemporary Beaumont–Adams and Colt Navy revolvers, making it ideal for colonial warfare. When facing charging tribesmen like the Zulus or Ansar (the so-called Sudanese Dervishes), more modern ammunition tended to go straight through the enemy who would keep going. What was needed was a heavy lead bullet that would lodge in their body and bring them down. One famous user was the photographer and film maker Lieutenant Colonel John M. B. Stanford, who killed a fanatical assegai-wielding Sudanese Ansar with a Lancaster pistol while working as a war correspondent at the Battle of Omdurman. It was eventually displaced by the various Webley revolvers in the late 19th century as revolvers became more reliable and faster to reload, thus removing many of the advantages of the multi-barrel design.
