= Ithaca Auto & Burglar =

Ithaca Auto & Burglar Gun
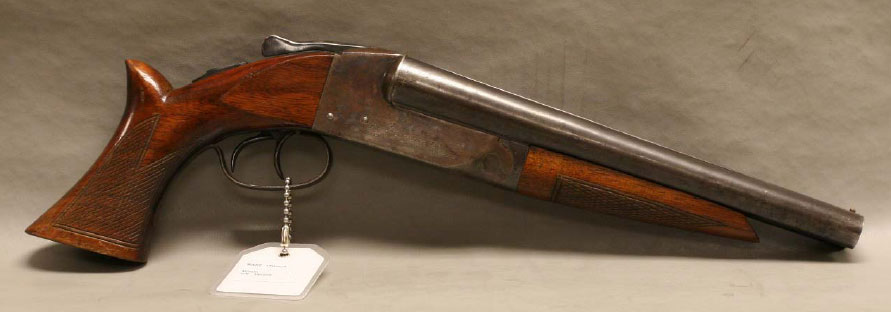
- Type: Double barrel shotgun
- Place of origin: United States

Service history
- Used by: Bank guards, police, messengers, home defense

Production history
- Manufacturer: Ithaca Gun Company
- Produced: 1922 - 1933
- No. built: approx. 4,000

Specifications
- Mass: 2 kg (4.5 lbs)
- Length: 406mm (16 inches)
- Barrel length: 317mm (12.5 inches) or 257mm (10.1 inches)
- Caliber: 20 gauge, 28 gauge
- Action: Break-action

The Auto & Burglar Gun was a US-made factory-built handgun that was commercially manufactured by configuring a standard double-barrel shotgun with a pistol grip, at first engraving and later stamping "Auto & Burglar Gun" on each side of the frame, and shortening the barrels to about 10" to 12.2" in length. A holster with a flap and a snap was available for purchase from Ithaca. It was outsourced to a leather company and was embossed with "Auto & Burglar" on it. They are also very rare and are infrequently seen for sale in any condition.

== Variants ==
=== Model A ===
The Auto & Burglar Gun was manufactured in two variations. Approximately 2,500 of the original variants were manufactured from 1921 to 1925 using Ithaca's standard 20 gauge Flues model shotgun, and designed to fire 2½" shells. Sometimes referred to as "Model A", its barrels were about 10" in length. These guns should only be fired with 2½" shells; firing longer shells will "bulge" the barrels.

=== Flues model ===
The Flues model was designed with a "saw handle" style grip featuring a large spur at the top to absorb recoil.

=== New Improved Double model ===
Ithaca redesigned the gun in 1925 using its New Improved Double (NID) model shotgun, which fires 2¾" shells; the barrels were lengthened to about 12.2"; and the grip was redesigned without the spur. Sometimes referred to as "Model B," about 1,500 were manufactured. Model A and Model B are not formal factory designations.

== Demise ==
Ithaca stopped manufacturing the Auto & Burglar Gun when it became subject to registration and a $200 transfer tax under the National Firearms Act (NFA) of 1934 (the transfer tax was reduced to $5 in 1960). Relatively few Auto & Burglar Guns were manufactured, and they are highly prized today as collector's items. Approximately 20 Auto & Burglar Guns were specially manufactured, representing .410 bore, 28 gauge, and 16 gauge, only 11 of which have been reliably documented, and all these guns are extremely rare. The earliest known Ithaca Auto & Burglar Gun was manufactured about 1921, possibly as a prototype: it bears serial number 354442, is in 28 gauge with 12" barrels, "Auto & Burglar Gun" is hand-engraved on each side, and the gun is listed separately in the Firearms Curios or Relics List published by the Bureau of Alcohol, Tobacco, Firearms and Explosives.

While it is sometimes incorrectly identified as a "sawed-off shotgun," the Ithaca Auto & Burglar Gun is a smooth bore pistol which since 1934 has been classified as an " Any Other Weapon" (AOW) under the NFA, and it must be registered with the Bureau of Alcohol, Tobacco, Firearms and Explosives (ATF). Auto & Burglar Guns that are not currently registered are contraband, and cannot be legally possessed or registered. The penalties for illegal possession include up to a $250,000 fine and 10 years in prison.

The "auto" in its name referred to "automobile": it was intended as a self-defense weapon that could easily be carried in an automobile, but it was taken up by bank guards, police departments, watchmen, and messengers.

== Modern Production ==
The Italian gunmaker Davide Pedersoli has recently begun marketing a replica of the Auto & Burglar pistol with rifled barrels chambered to accept either .45 Colt or .410 shotshells. The rifled barrels, and the fact it is built as a pistol from the start, keeps it clear of the National Firearms Act.

== See also ==
- Title II weapons
- Howdah pistol
