= Charles William Lancaster =

British gunmaker

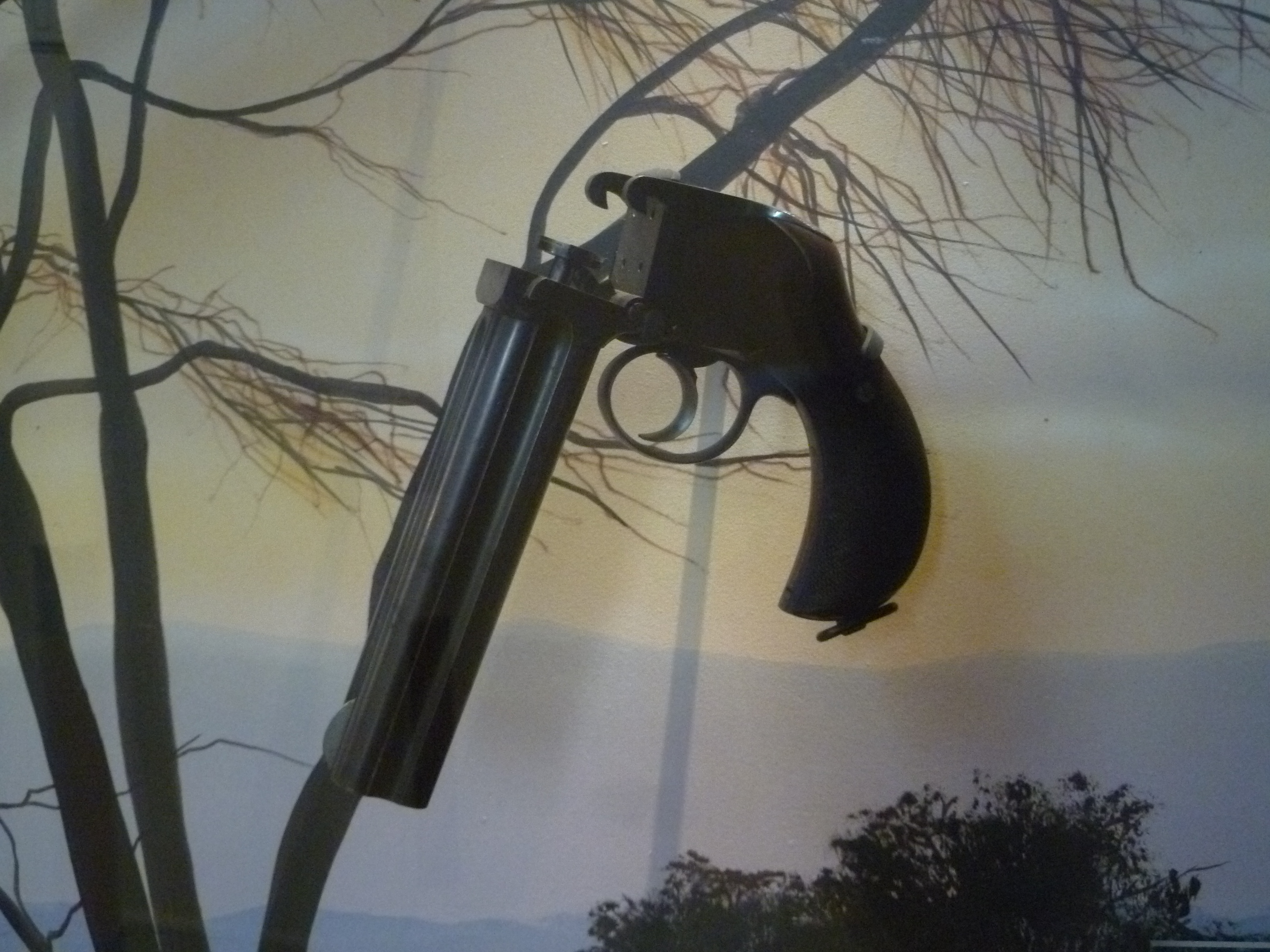
- Lancaster pepperbox designed by Charles Lancaster and his assistant Henry Thorn
- Born: Charles William Lancaster; 24 June 1820; London, England
- Died: 24 April 1878 (aged 57); London, England
- Occupation: Gunsmith
- Spouse: Ellen Edward (m. 1868)

Charles William Lancaster (1820–1878) was a British gunmaker and improver of rifles and cannon.

== Biography ==
Lancaster was the eldest son of Charles Lancaster, gunmaker, of 151 New Bond Street, London. He was born at 5 York Street, Portman Square, London, on 24 June 1820. On leaving school he entered his father's factory, where he practically learnt the business of a gunmaker and soon became a clever designer of models, a thoroughly skilled workman, and a mechanician of high order. The study of rifled projectiles and the construction of rifles was his chief pleasure, and he soon attained the highest skill as a rifle shot.

In 1846, Lancaster constructed a model rifle with which he experimented at Woolwich with success at distances of 1,000 and 1,200 yards (920 and 1,100 m). The Duke of Wellington then ordered some similar rifles for the Rifle Brigade at the Cape of Good Hope. The years 1844 and 1845 were devoted to solving the problem of rifled cannon. In July 1846, he submitted to the Board of Ordnance a plan for firing from a rifled cannon smooth-sided conical projectiles; the required rotary motion coming from a sabot fitted to the base of the projectile, the base having a V cross-piece cast in it. Further experiments, however, did not encourage him to go on with this scheme.

In 1850, he conceived the idea of the oval bore as the proper form for all rifled arms and cannon; with which his name is associated. In order to publicize his invention, he constructed full-size working models of the 68-pounder, the largest gun then in the service, for the Great Exhibition of 1851. At the request of the government, these models were not exhibited, but a 68-pounder oval-bore gun, made and rifled at Birmingham, with accurately turned shells, was sent to Shoeburyness for trial. The shooting of this gun directed attention to the oval-bore system, and in the succeeding experiments made at Woolwich, Lancaster assisted the War Department and for some time superintended the production of the guns in the Royal Arsenal. In 1852, he experimented upon the .577 pattern Enfield rifled musket and sent to the school of musketry at Hythe some specimens of carbines bored on his peculiar system. The device was considered satisfactory. In January 1855, the Lancaster carbine was adopted as the arm for the Royal Engineers, and was used by members of the corps until it was superseded by the Martini-Henry rifle in 1869. During the Crimean campaign, oval-bored rifle cannon were used in the form of the 68-pounder Lancaster gun and were considered disappointing with less accuracy than expected and a tendency to jam or burst. Shortly after the war, heavier guns were required for armour-piercing, and the experiments carried out at Shoeburyness, in which Lancaster assisted, led to a complete revolution in rifled artillery. For the oval-bore system of rifling, he received substantial rewards from the government. His transactions with the War Office, however, led to disputes, and he scheduled his claims in a pamphlet but was unsuccessful in obtaining the recognition of his services to which he considered himself entitled. Between 1850 and 1872, he took out upwards of twenty patents, chiefly in connection with firearms but including a joint patent with John Hughes for iron plating ships in 1860. His last invention was a gas-check, applicable to large rifled projectiles.

He travelled much in Russia, where the Czar had a special gold medal of large size struck in his honour. He was elected an associate of the Institution of Civil Engineers on 6 April 1852 and wrote a paper in their Minutes of Proceedings (xl. 115), "On the Erosion of the Bore in Heavy Guns". While making arrangements for retiring from business, he was seized with paralysis and died at 151 New Bond Street, London, on 24 April 1878. He married in 1868 Ellen, daughter of George Edward and Ann Thorne of Old Stratford, Northamptonshire, by whom he had two daughters.

== See also ==
- 68-pounder Lancaster gun
- Lancaster pepperbox
