= Swinburn–Henry =

Swinburn–Henry rifle
- P. Webley & Son contract of the Swinburn–Henry rifle held at the National Museum of American History
- Place of origin: United Kingdom

Service history
- In service: 1870s
- Used by: Colony of Natal
- Wars: Anglo-Zulu War

Production history
- Designer: J. S. Swinburn
- Designed: 1872
- Manufacturer: Abingdon Gun Works

Specifications
- Mass: 9 lb (4.1 kg)
- Length: 49 1/4 in (1,250 mm)
- Barrel length: 33 1/4 in (840 mm)
- Cartridge: .577/450 Martini–Henry
- Calibre: .455 in (11.6 mm)
- Action: Falling-block
- Feed system: Single-shot
- References: The South African Military History Society

Swinburn–Henry carbine

Specifications
- Mass: 7 lb 2 oz (3.2 kg)
- Length: 39 1/2 in (1,000 mm)
- Barrel length: 23 1/4 in (590 mm)
- References: The South African Military History Society

The Swinburn–Henry rifle was a breech-loading lever-actuated single-shot rifle that was used by British Commonwealth forces in the late 1870s as substitute for the Martini–Henry, which was at the time in short supply.

== Design ==
The Swinburn–Henry had the same barrel as the Martini–Henry with Henry pattern 7-groove polygonal with ribbed angles & right hand twist rifling. The Swinburn–Henry also bore a striking resemblance to the Martini–Henry, but internally the two were quite distinct. Both rifles were breech-loading falling block single shot rifles, with a cocking under lever opening the breech of the weapon to load a round into the chamber, but the Swinburn–Henry employed a V spring and hammer to strike the firing pin and the Swinburn–Henry's butt was attached to the receiver by means of an upper and a lower tang instead of a sturdy axial bolt.

The most noticeable difference between the Swinburn–Henry and the Martini–Henry was the former had a thumb operated side lever which allowed the hammer to be cocked without operating the under lever, unlike the Martini–Henry. In practice this proved to be a major advantage for the Swinburn–Henry over Martini–Henry, as the former could be carried cocked in a saddle bag without risk of it discharging by itself.

The greatest advantage of the Swinburn–Henry design was it fired the same .577/450 Martini–Henry cartridge as the Martini–Henry. The Swinburn design was distinct enough from the Martini design to circumvent the Martini patent that was at the time in force, but in practice the action proved to be more fragile and more prone to stoppages than the Martini action.

=== Rifle ===
The Swinburn–Henry rifle had a barrel of 33 1/4 inches (840 mm) and weighed 9 pounds (4.1 kg), with sights graduated out to 1,300 yards (1,200 m). The rifle was typically issued to infantry, it was often supplied with commercially manufactured 1875 Pattern sword bayonets, although Pattern 1871 cutlass bayonets were used with the rifles by naval volunteers.

=== Carbine ===
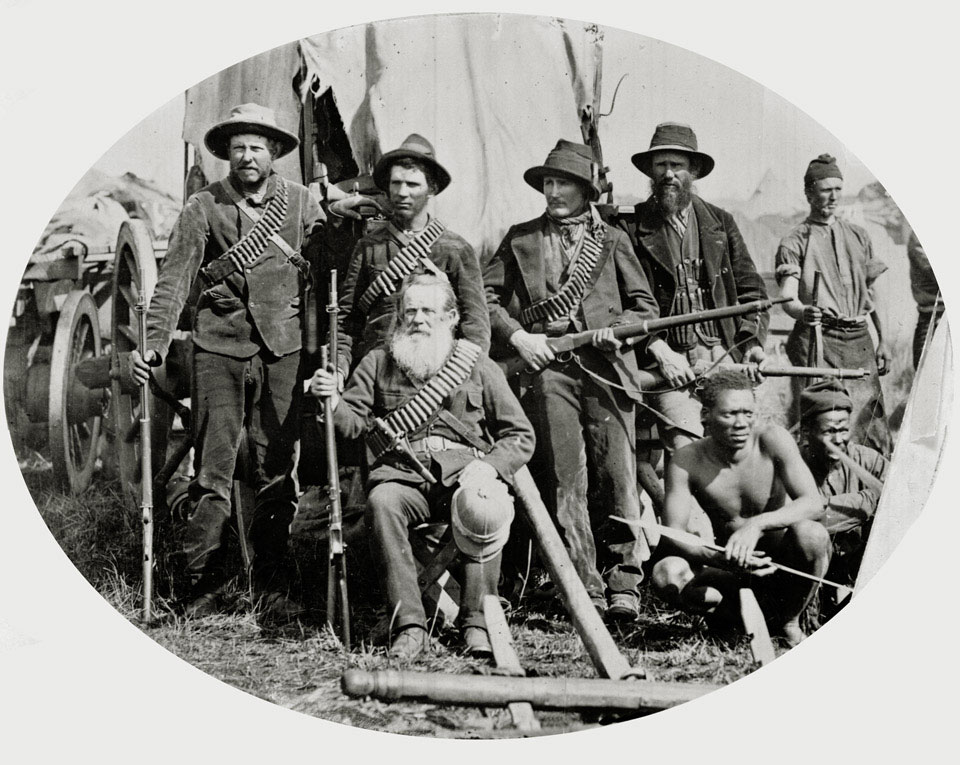
Commandant Petras Lefras Uys Jr., the son of Piet Uys, with his sons in 1879. Uys wields a Swinburn–Henry Carbine and bayonet

The Swinburn–Henry carbine had a barrel of 23 1/4 inches (590 mm) and weighed 7 pounds 2 ounces (3.2 kg), with sights graduated out to 800 yards (730 m). The carbine was typically issued to mounted troops and police and some were supplied with a Bowie knife bayonet, although in service these bayonets proved to be ineffectual.

== History ==
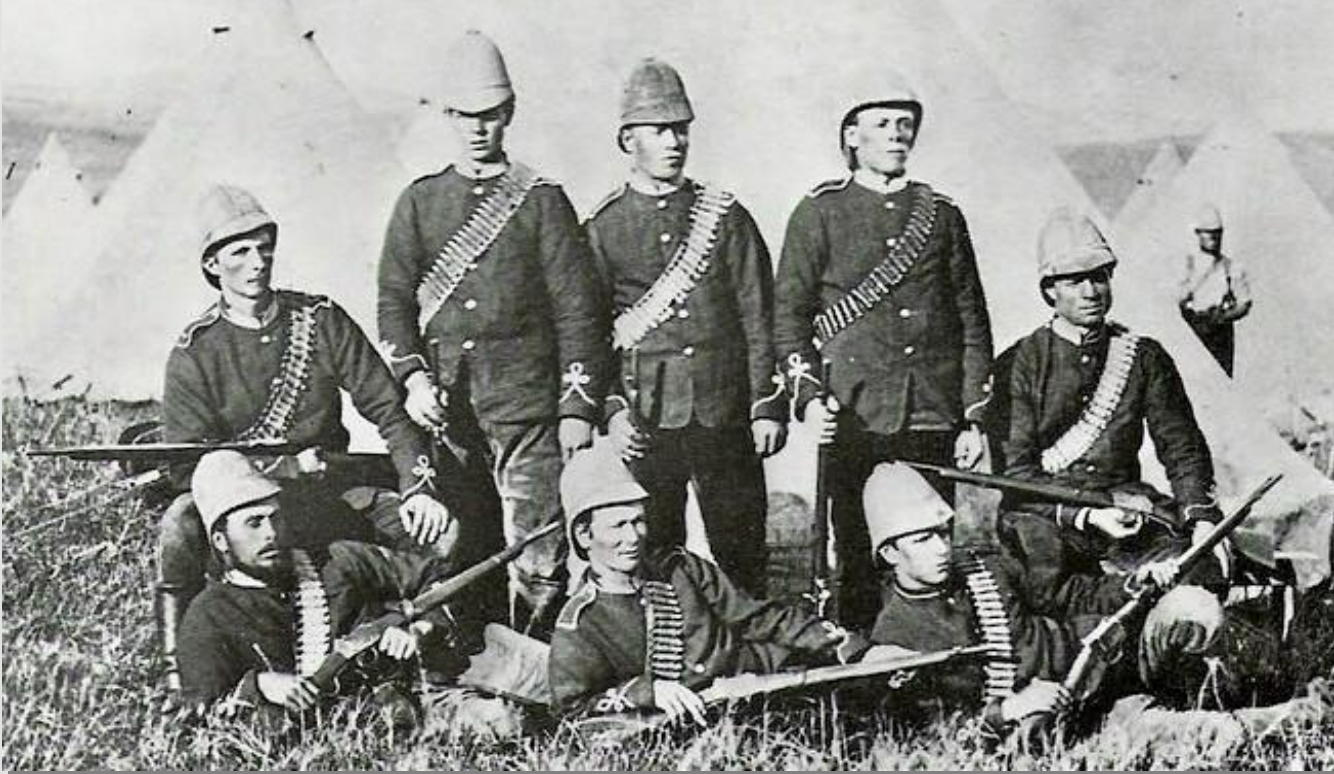
Sir Evelyn Wood's bodyguard during the Anglo-Zulu War with Swinburn–Henry carbines.

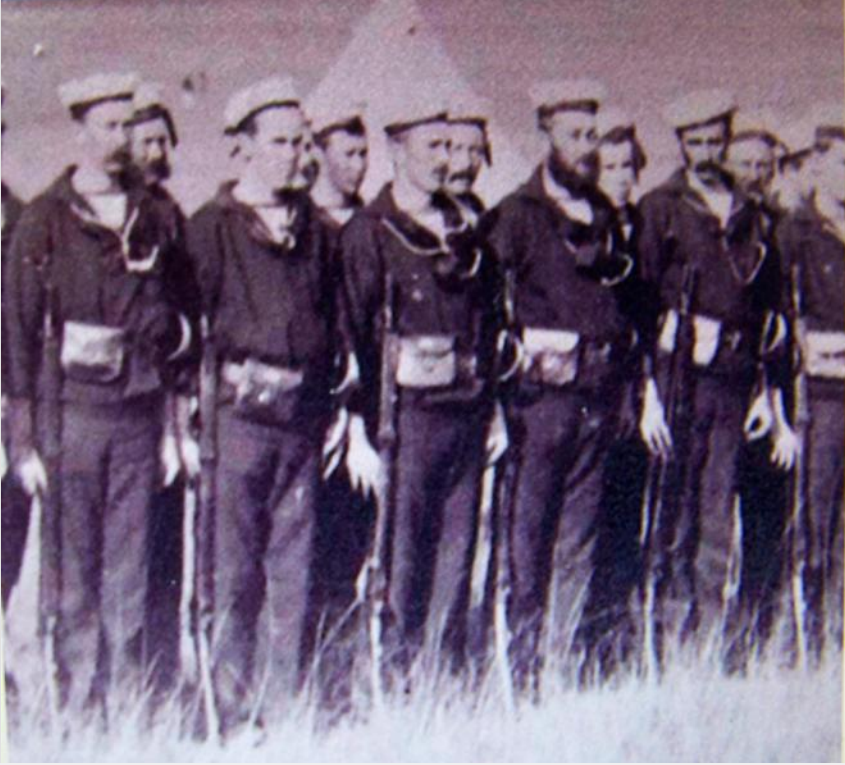
Natal Naval Volunteers parading with their Swinburn–Henry rifles and Pattern 1871 cutlass bayonets.

The Swinburn–Henry was designed by J. S. Swinburn of Swinburn & Son, Birmingham and patented in 1872, all production was carried out by Abingdon Works Co. Ltd., Birmingham.

The Swinburn–Henry was used extensively by the volunteer forces of the Colony of Natal. It is unknown exactly how many were purchased, but deliveries commenced in 1875 and by 1878 the colony had received 2,040 carbines and 1,150 rifles along with 190 Bowie knife carbine bayonets (made by John Kerr of London hence a JKL stamp on the blade) and an unknown quantity of sword bayonets. The carbines were issued to the mounted units and the rifles to the infantry, the Swinburn–Henry was also issued to the Natal Mounted Police and naval volunteers.

The Swinburn–Henry was used by Natal's forces during the Anglo-Zulu War, the carbine in particular saw broad service in the early months of the conflict. Both the rifle and the carbine were eventually replaced by the Martini–Henry.

== See also ==
- Farquharson rifle
