= Robert Swinburne =

Robert Swinburne may refer to:

- Robert Swinburne (c. 1327 – 1391), MP for Essex
- Robert Swinburne (born c. 1376), MP for Newcastle-upon-Tyne
