= John Swinburne (cricketer) =

English cricketer

Personal information
- Full name: John Warwick Swinburne
- Born: 4 December 1939; Wath-upon-Dearne, Yorkshire, England
- Died: 19 August 2011 (aged 71); Stourbridge, Worcestershire, England
- Batting: Right-handed
- Bowling: Right-arm off break

Domestic team information
- Years: Team
- 1975–1977: Shropshire
- 1970–1974: Northamptonshire
- 1964–1969: Devon

Career statistics
Competition	First-class	List A
Matches	29	2
Runs scored	159	16
Batting average	5.67	16.00
100s/50s	–/–	–/–
Top score	25	16
Balls bowled	4,664	84
Wickets	83	–
Bowling average	27.48	–
5 wickets in innings	4	–
10 wickets in match	1	–
Best bowling	6/57	–
Catches/stumpings	13/–	1/–
- Source: Cricinfo, 17 April 2011

John Warwick Swinburne (4 December 1939 – 19 August 2011) was an English cricketer. Swinburne was a right-handed batsman who bowled right-arm off break. He was born in Wath-upon-Dearne, Yorkshire and educated at Wath Grammar School and Leeds University.

Swinburne first played county cricket for Devon, making his debut for the county in the 1964 Minor Counties Championship against Berkshire. He continued to play Minor counties cricket for Devon until 1969, in which time he made 46 appearances for the county. Swinburne joined Northamptonshire in 1970, making his first-class debut in the County Championship against Warwickshire. He played first-class cricket for Northamptonshire from 1970 to 1974, making 29 first-class appearances. A tailend batsman, Swinburne scored 159 runs in first-class cricket at a batting average of just 5.67. His position within the team was that of a bowler. He took 83 wickets for Northamptonshire at a bowling average of 27.48, with four five wicket hauls and one ten wicket haul in a match. His best innings bowling figures came against Warwickshire in 1971, with Swinburne taking figures of 6/57 to guide Northamptonshire to a close 46 run win.

It was also for Northamptonshire that he made his debut in List A cricket, in the 1971 John Player League against Middlesex. In this match he bowled 4 wicket-less overs in what was his only List A appearance for the county. Following the end of his first-class career at the end of the 1974 season, he joined Shropshire for the 1975 season, for whom he played 20 Minor Counties Championship matches till 1977, while playing at club level for Old Hill. He played his second and final List A match for Shropshire in the 1976 Gillette Cup against Yorkshire. In this match Swinburne scored 16 runs before being dismissed by Geoff Cope, and with the ball he bowled 10 overs, but once again went wicket-less.

Swinburne died on 19 August 2011, at the age of 71.
