= Trevor Swinburne =

English footballer

Personal information
- Full name: Trevor Swinburne
- Date of birth: 20 June 1953 (age 73)
- Place of birth: Houghton-le-Spring, England
- Height: 6 ft 0 in (1.83 m)
- Position: Goalkeeper

Youth career
- Lambton and Hetton Boys
- –1968: East Rainton Youth
- 1968–1970: Sunderland

Senior career*
Years	Team	Apps	(Gls)
1970–1977	Sunderland	10	(0)
1977–1983	Carlisle United	248	(0)
1983–1985	Brentford	45	(0)
1985–1986	Leeds United	2	(0)
1985	→ Doncaster Rovers (loan)	4	(0)
1986–1987	Lincoln City	34	(0)
Total		343	(0)
- * Club domestic league appearances and goals

Trevor Swinburne (born 20 June 1953) is an English retired professional football goalkeeper who made nearly 250 appearances in the Football League for Carlisle United.

He also played league football for Brentford, Lincoln City, Sunderland, Doncaster Rovers and Leeds United.

== Personal life ==
Swinburne's father, Tom, and brother Alan were also professional footballers. After retiring from football in 1987, Swinburne worked for Her Majesty's Prison Service and eventually became a governor.

Trevor Swinburne has three sons and three grandchildren.

As of 2020, Swinburne was the chairman of Lincoln City Former players association and host of Lincoln City Radio Sports Zone.

== Honours ==
Sunderland

FA youth cup winner: 1968-1969

FA cup winner (Squad member) : 1972-73

Carlisle United

- Football League Third Division second-place promotion: 1981–82

Incomplete

== Career statistics ==
Club	Season	League			FA Cup		League Cup		Europe		Other		Total	
Club	Season	Division	Apps	Goals	Apps	Goals	Apps	Goals	Apps	Goals	Apps	Goals	Apps	Goals
Sunderland	1972–73	Second Division	1	0	0	0	0	0	—		—		1	0
Sunderland	1973–74	Second Division	1	0	0	0	0	0	0	0	—		1	0
Sunderland	1974–75	Second Division	2	0	1	0	0	0	—		0	0	3	0
Sunderland	1975–76	Second Division	4	0	0	0	0	0	—		2 (Note: Appearances in Anglo-Scottish Cup.)	0	6	0
Sunderland	1976–77	First Division	2	0	0	0	0	0	—		—		2	0
Sunderland	Total		10	0	1	0	0	0	0	0	2	0	13	0
Brentford	1983–84	Third Division	21	0	1	0	4	0	—		2 (Note: Appearances in Football League Trophy.)	0	28	0
Brentford	1984–85	Third Division	24	0	4	0	4	0	—		0	0	32	0
Brentford	Total		45	0	5	0	8	0	—		2	0	60	0
Leeds United	1985–86	Second Division	2	0	0	0	0	0	—		—		2	0
Doncaster Rovers (loan)	1985–86	Third Division	4	0	—		—		—		—		4	0
Career total			61	0	6	0	8	0	0	0	4	0	79	0
