= .577 Snider =

Large rifle cartridge

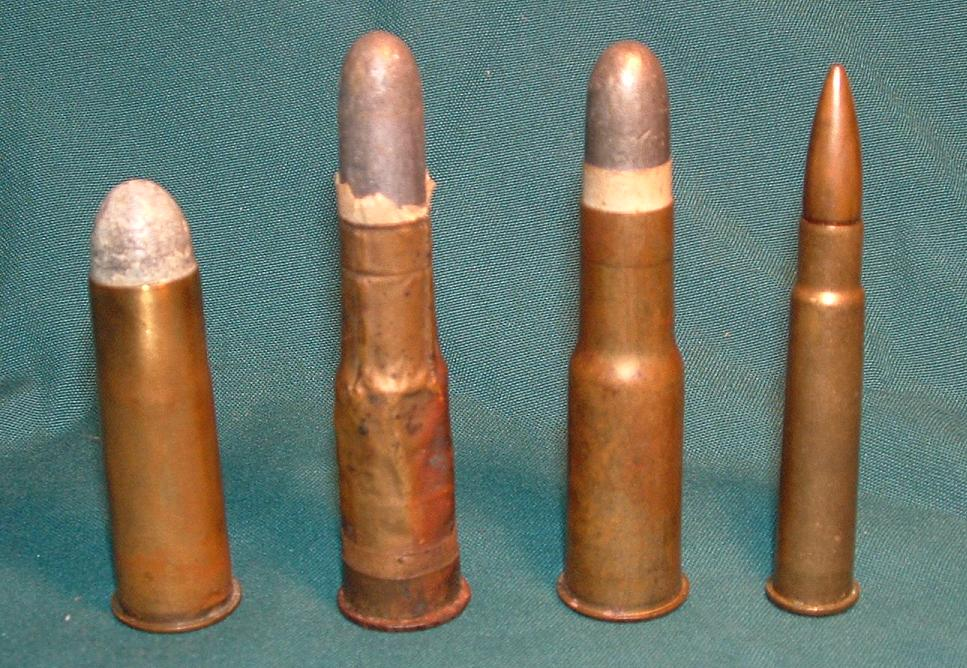
- (From Left to Right): A .577 Snider cartridge, a Zulu War–era rolled brass foil .577/450 Martini–Henry Cartridge, a later drawn brass .577/450 Martini–Henry cartridge, and a .303 British Mk VII SAA Ball cartridge
- Type: Rifle
- Place of origin: Great Britain

Service history
- In service: 1866–1871

Production history
- Designer: Edward Mounier Boxer
- Designed: 1866

Specifications
- Case type: Rimmed, straight
- Bullet diameter: .570 in (14.5 mm)
- Neck diameter: .602 in (15.3 mm)
- Base diameter: .660 in (16.8 mm)
- Rim diameter: .747 in (19.0 mm)
- Rim thickness: .065 in (1.7 mm)
- Case length: 2.0 in (51 mm)
- Overall length: 2.45 in (62 mm)
- Primer type: Boxer

Ballistic performance
Bullet mass/type	Velocity	Energy
450 gr (29 g) lead	1,300 ft/s (400 m/s)	1,689 ft⋅lbf (2,290 J)

The .577 Snider (14.7×51mm) cartridge was a British black powder metallic centrefire cartridge, which fired a 0.577-inch (14.7 mm), 480-grain (31 g) lead projectile, primarily used in the Snider–Enfield rifle.

== Background ==
Around 1860, a London gunmaker George H. Daw, introduced a double-barreled shotgun designed to be loaded with centrefire cartridges and in 1864, he published the book Daw's Gun Patents, which illustrates the construction of his centrefire − a metal cup containing the primer was pressed on the base of the cardboard case body and a wad of papier-mâché was pressed around the primer pocket, which was perforated in the middle to allow the flames to reach out and ignite the gunpowder charge.

Before Daw was awarded with a patent, Colonel Edward Boxer—then Superintendent of the Royal Arsenal, Woolwich—was tasked with designing a cartridge for the Snider–Enfield. Boxer used the metallic cup element of Daw's design combined with a paper-covered brass foil case, receiving the English patent no. 127 on 22 June, 1866, a year before Daw.

== History ==
Early .577 Snider cartridges had a tendency of splitting at the metallic cup or between the mouth of the cup and the base of the case body when fired, resulting in misfires and failure to extract the cartridges, leading Edward Boxer to refine his design into the Mark II and III variants, which served as base for British military issue Snider ammunition. Estimated cost was about £8 per thousand rounds.

In 1886, the Dominion Arsenal at Quebec conducted endurance tests subjecting Snider cartridges with or without the paper covering to prolonged moisture. The all-metal cartridges remained serviceable while 30% of the paper-covered ones were still serviceable. The paper covering absorbed and retained the water, soaking the powder charge. Subsequently, Canadian-made cartridges omitted the paper covering. Commercial-made cartridges such as Eley's also make use of all-metallic cartridges.

Another modification included the replacement of the rolled brass foil case with drawn brass. Though the original rolled brass cartridges were inexpensive to produce and remained in use for training while the military adopted drawn brass cartridges.

The .577 Snider cartridge had a short official service life—serving from 1866 until 1871—when it was replaced by the .577/450 Martini–Henry cartridge, though it remained in service with colonial troops, game scouts, irregular police units, prison guards for several more years, with rifle production continuing as late as 1884. Snider–Enfields were also commonly used by the Boers, since they could produce ammunition batches in their own farms.

Due to the lack of centrefire cartridges in the civilian market in 1867 and the ready availability of Snider ammunition, gunmakers at the time produced hunting rifles and Howdah pistols chambered for the .577 Snider, with Kynoch producing different loadings ranging from the original military 480 grains (31 g) lead ball to copper tube hunting rounds, birdshot and buckshot.

New brass can be formed from a 24 gauge hull and reloading dies are available from Lee. As of 2015, Kynamco Kynoch in the United Kingdom and Bertram in Australia are also producing ready-made brass.

== Variants ==
- Mark I − Introduced on 12 July, 1866 as the Cartridge, Boxer, Ball, for Snider Rifles, (Pattern I), it used a 525 grains (34.0 g) lead bullet with a hollow base filled with pressed clay and hollow nose with a wooden plug, and a single-piece brass metallic base cup housing the Boxer primer lined with a wad of papier-mâché to provide the paper-covered rolled brass foil case body with a snug fit
- Mark II − Approved in August 1866 as the Cartridge, Small Arm, Ball, Snider 0.577 inch (Mark II), the case body and bullet was the same as of Mark I, but the metallic base was made from separate components (brass disc, base cup, and reinforcing strip. Like the Mark I, a wad of papier-mâché was pressed over the base cup, which was crimped to the base to firmly hold the components together. The Boxer primer was also slightly modified for safety reasons
- Mark III − Approved in April 1867 as the Cartridge, Small Arm, Ball, Snider 0.577 inch (Mark III), it was identical to the Mark II, but with a 480 gr (31 g) bullet
- Mark IV − Approved in August 1867, the construction was the same as the Mark II and III, but the base disc was made of lacquered iron which was also used on later variants. It was fitted with a 480 gr bullet with 70 gr (4.5 g) powder charge
- Mark V – Approved in late 1867, identical to the Mark IV but with a lighter base cup and a brownish paper covering
- Mark VI − Replaced the Mark V in August 1868, it's identical to its predecessor, but with slightly thicker case and base cup walls. A single black line was painted around the case body for identification
- Mark VII − Same as the Mark VI, but with the wooden plug in the bullet nose covered with lead
- Mark VIII − Same construction as the Mark VII, but the primer pocket was made of copper instead of brass, while the bullet was coated with shellac to provide waterproofing and protection against corrosion, though the bullet coating was later discontinued. The case body differs from the Mark VI and VII by having two black bands painted instead of one
- Mark IX − Last official British issue, it was approved on 16 August, 1871. Identical to the Mark VIII, but with a longer base cup. The primer pocket was once again made of brass, while the case body was marked with a single red band for identification
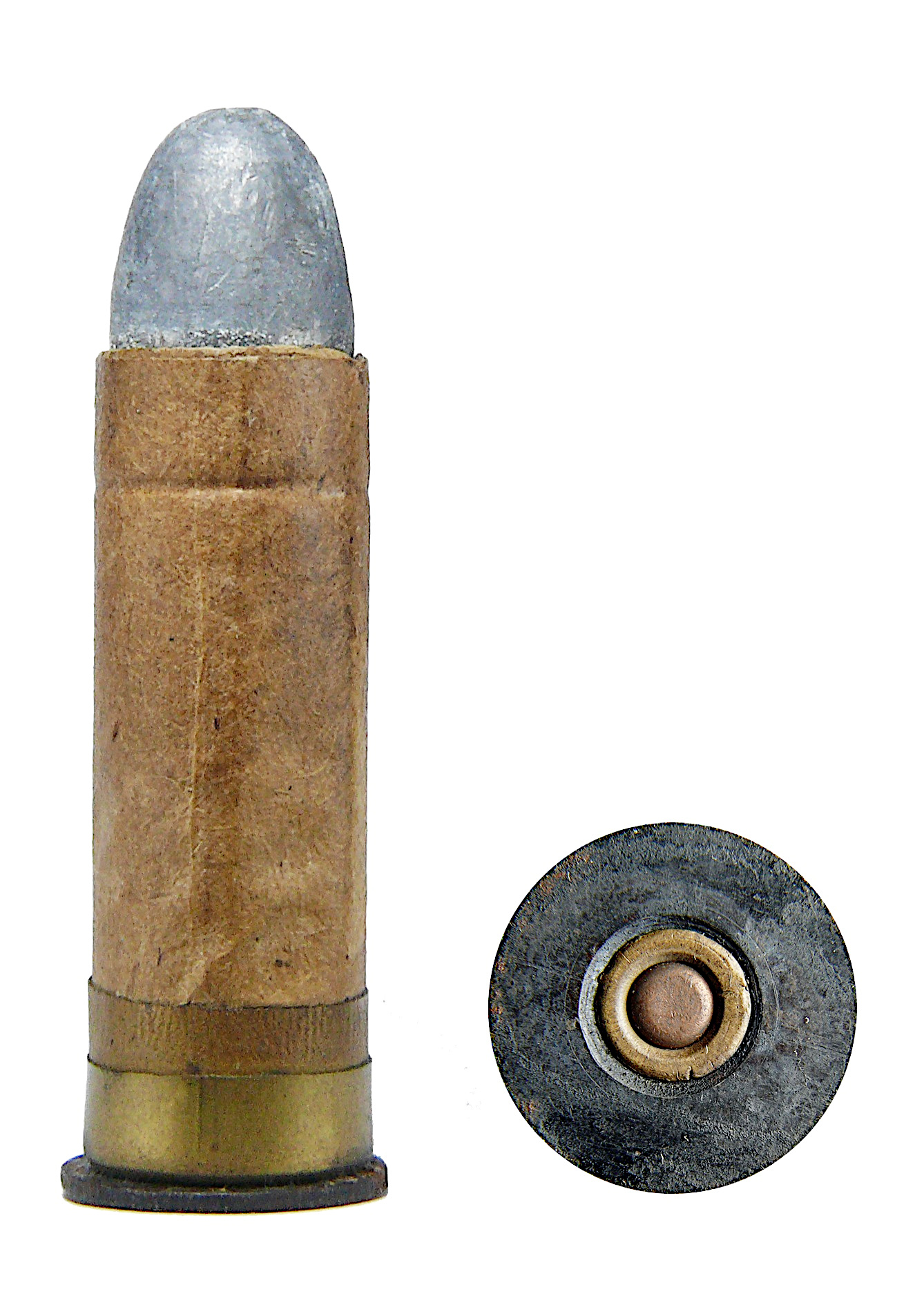
A Mark I bullet

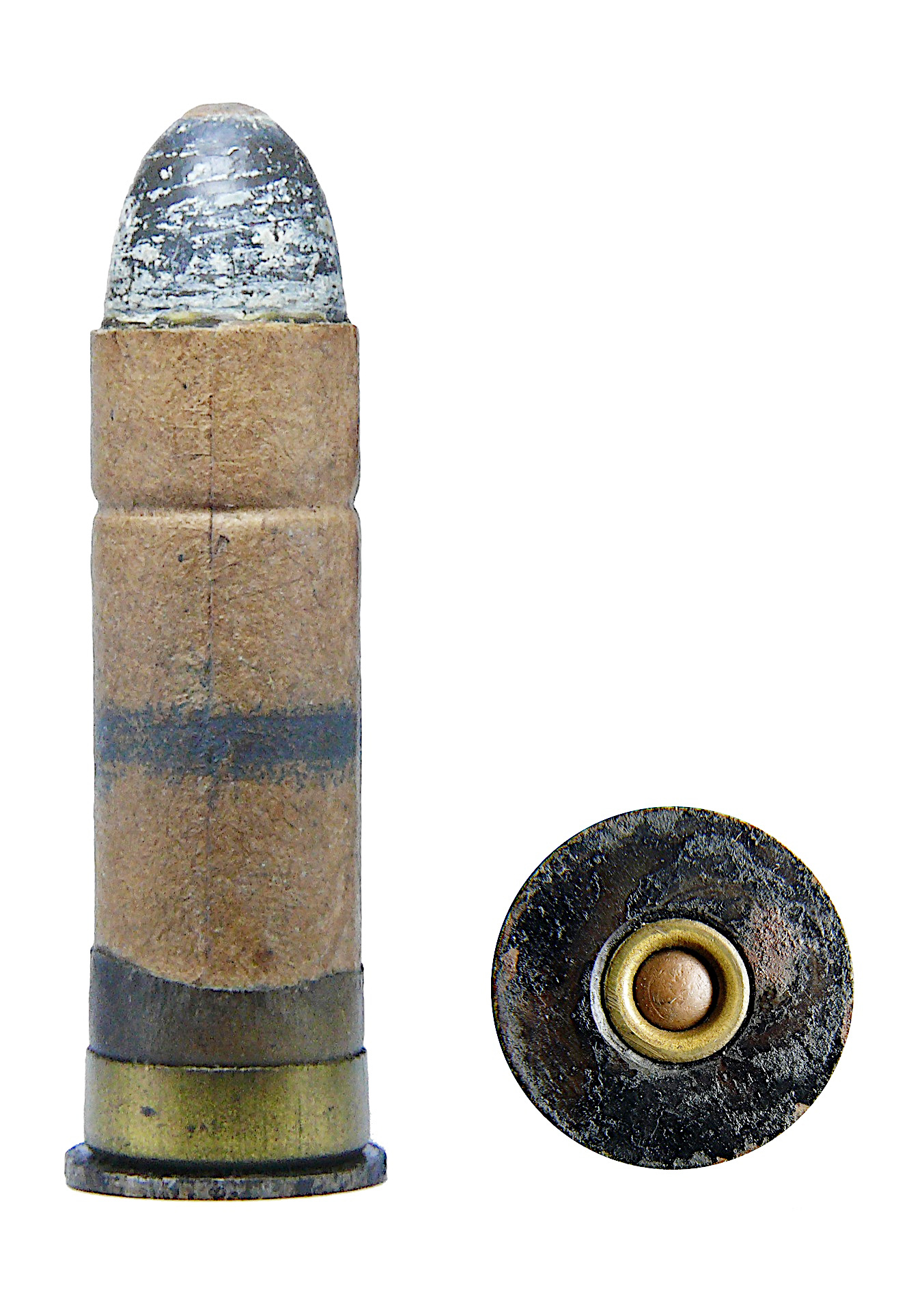
A Mark VI bullet

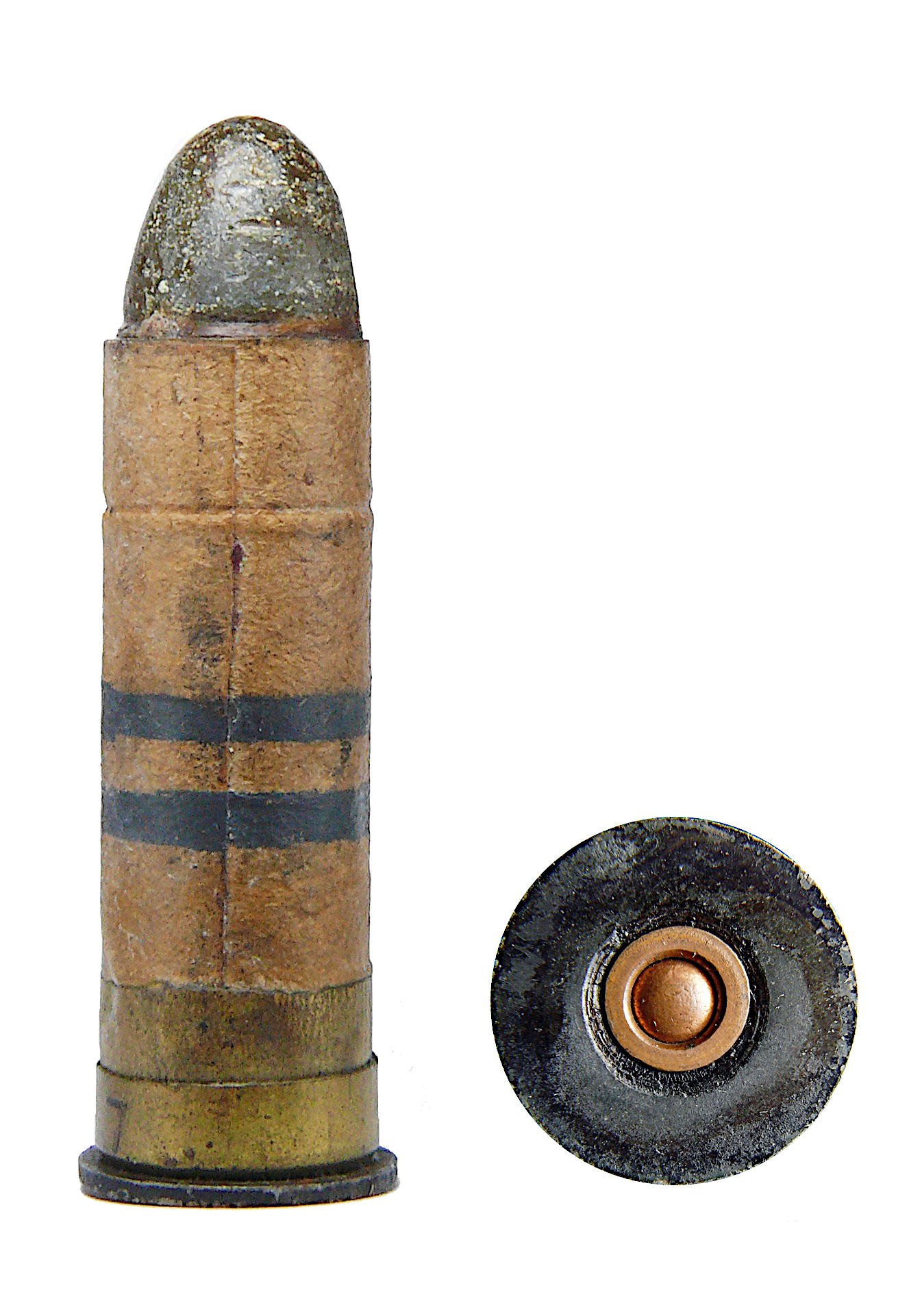
A Mark VIII bullet

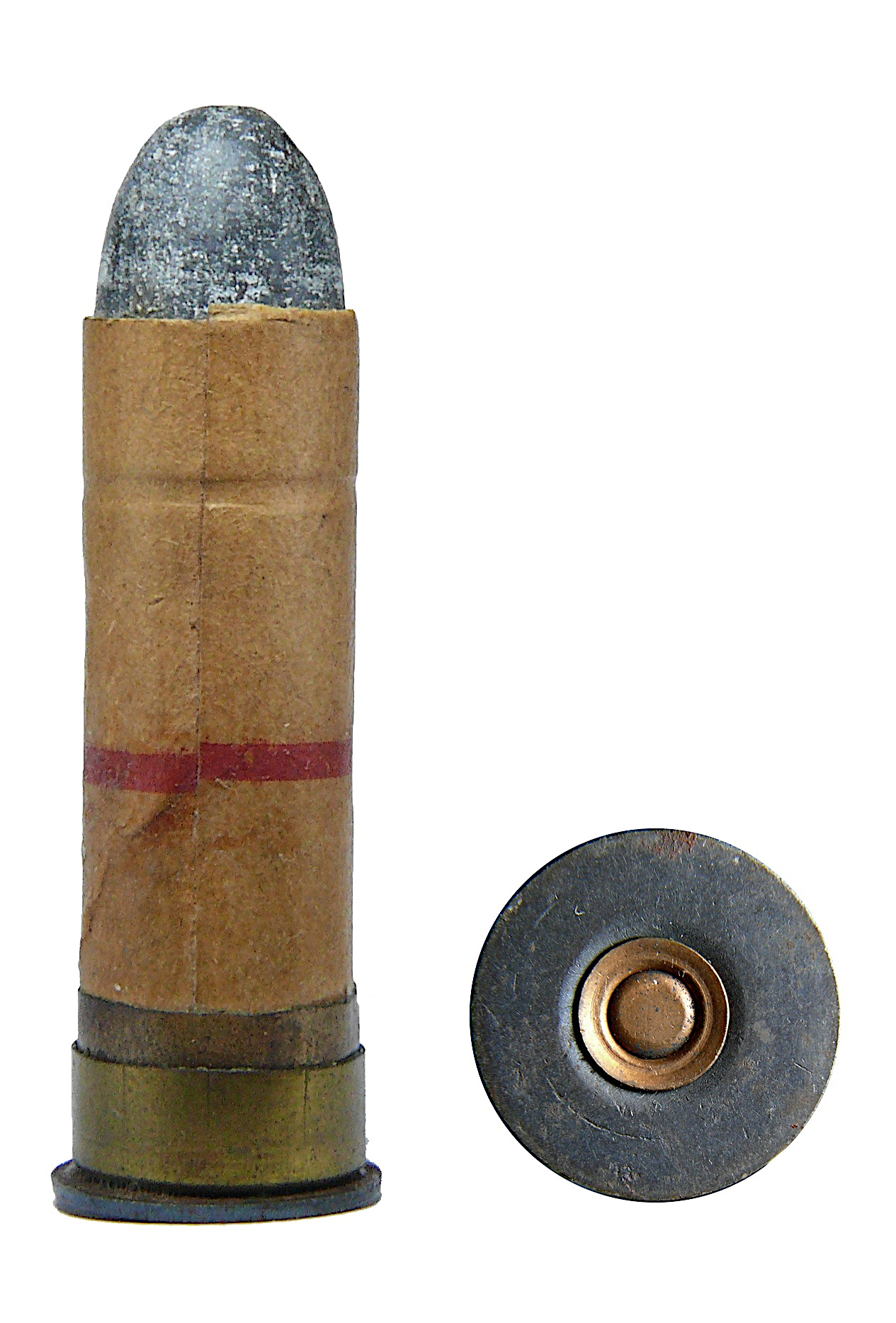
A Mark IX bullet

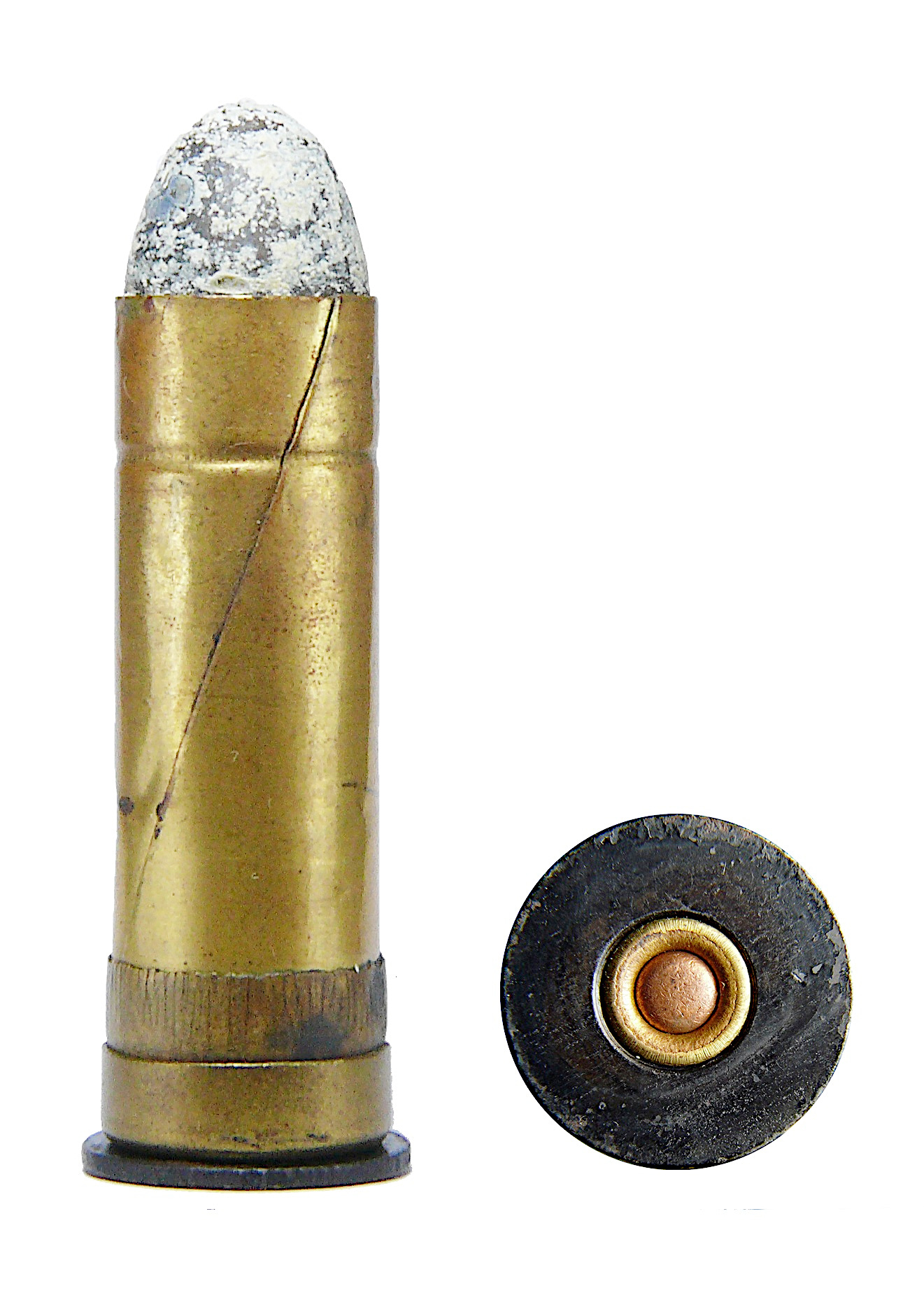
A Canadian 2nd Pattern bullet

== See also ==
- .577 Nitro Express
- .577/450 Martini–Henry
- List of rimmed cartridges
