= Tom Swinburne =

English footballer

Personal information
- Full name: Thomas Anderson Swinburne
- Date of birth: 9 August 1915
- Place of birth: Houghton-le-Spring, England
- Date of death: 1969 (aged 53–54)
- Place of death: County Durham, England
- Height: 5 ft 9 in (1.75 m)
- Position: Goalkeeper

Senior career*
| Years | Team | Apps | (Gls) |
| –1932 | East Rainton | | |
| 1932 | Hull City | 0 | (0) |
| –1934 | Herrington Colliery | | |
| 1934–1947 | Newcastle United | 77 | (0) |
- Consett
- Horden Colliery Welfare
- * Club domestic league appearances and goals

Thomas Anderson Swinburne (9 August 1915 – 19 December 1969) was an English professional football goalkeeper who played in the Football League for Newcastle United. Swinburne represented England once, in a wartime international in December 1939.

Swinburne was initially offered terms by West Ham United having been scouted playing for Herrington Swifts at the age of 17, however as he was homesick he returned to the North East. He was quickly signed by Newcastle and made his debut for them on 12 September 1934 against Blackpool.

His career was greatly disturbed by the Second World War, with Swinburne serving as a PT and fitness instructor for the RAF in Egypt.

After the war, he restarted his Newcastle career, and was a star performer during their 1946–47 FA Cup run, which saw Newcastle finish as semi-finalists. His final appearance for the Magpies was against Newport County on 7 June 1947.

The character of Jill Swinburne in the Biederbecke Trilogy was named in homage to the Newcastle goalkeeper.

== Personal life ==
Swinburne's sons Alan and Trevor also became professional footballers.

== Career statistics ==
Appearances and goals by club, season and competition
| Club | Season | League | | | FA Cup | | Total | |
| Club | Season | Division | Apps | Goals | Apps | Goals | Apps | Goals |
|---|---|---|---|---|---|---|---|---|
| Newcastle United | 1934–35 | Second Division | 2 | 0 | 0 | 0 | 2 | 0 |
| Newcastle United | 1937–38 | Second Division | 24 | 0 | 1 | 0 | 25 | 0 |
| Newcastle United | 1938–39 | Second Division | 30 | 0 | 1 | 0 | 31 | 0 |
| Newcastle United | 1946–47 | Second Division | 21 | 0 | 5 | 0 | 26 | 0 |
| Career total | | | 77 | 0 | 7 | 0 | 84 | 0 |
