= Alan Swinburne =

English footballer

Personal information
- Full name: Alan Thomas Anderson Swinburne
- Date of birth: 18 May 1946 (age 80)
- Place of birth: Houghton-le-Spring, England
- Position: Goalkeeper

Youth career
- –1963: Oldham Athletic

Senior career*
Years	Team	Apps	(Gls)
1963–1964	Oldham Athletic	4	(0)
1964	Newcastle United	0	(0)
- * Club domestic league appearances and goals

Alan Thomas Anderson Swinburne (born 18 May 1946) was an English professional footballer who played as a goalkeeper in the Football League for Oldham Athletic.

== Personal life ==
Swinburne's father Tom and brother Trevor were also professional footballers.
