= .577/450 Martini–Henry =

British rifle cartridge

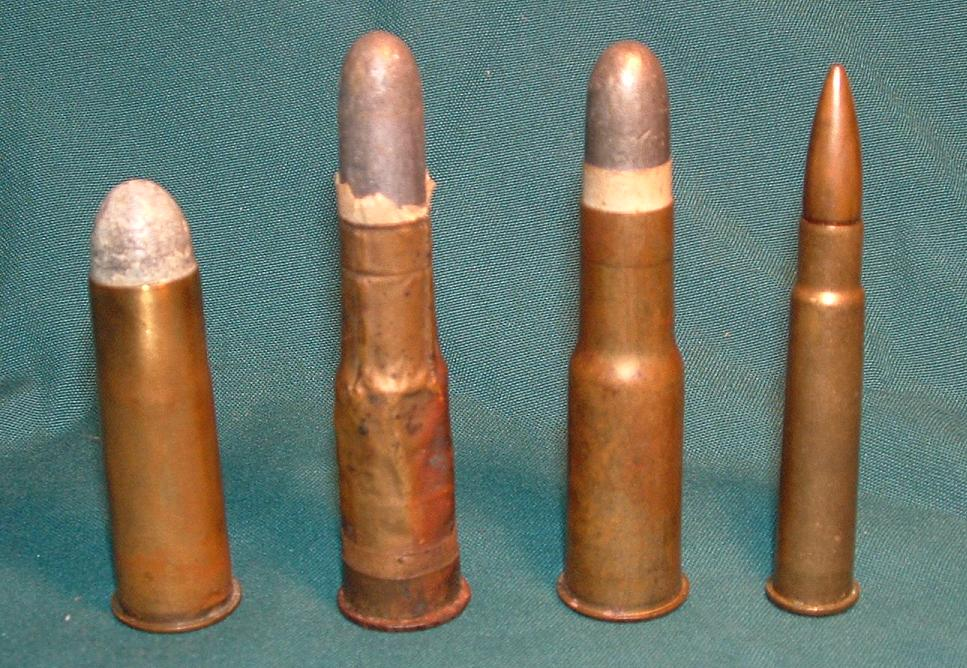
- .577 Snider, two .577/450 Martini–Henry (coiled brass & drawn brass) and .303 British cartridges.
- Place of origin: UK

Service history
- Used by: British Empire
- Wars: Anglo-Zulu War; Mahdist War; First Boer War; Second Boer War; World War I

Production history
- Designed: 1871

Specifications
- Parent case: .577 Snider
- Case type: Rimmed, bottleneck
- Bullet diameter: .455 in (11.6 mm)
- Neck diameter: .487 in (12.4 mm)
- Shoulder diameter: .628 in (16.0 mm)
- Base diameter: .668 in (17.0 mm)
- Rim diameter: .746 in (18.9 mm)
- Rim thickness: .05 in (1.3 mm)
- Case length: 2.34 in (59 mm)
- Overall length: 3.12 in (79 mm)

Ballistic performance
Bullet mass/type	Velocity	Energy
480 gr (31 g) lead alloy.	1,350 ft/s (410 m/s)	1,940 ft⋅lbf (2,630 J)
- Source: Cartridges of the World.

The .577/450 Martini–Henry (Also known as 11.43×60R (61R)) is a black powder, centrefire rifle cartridge. It was the standard British service cartridge from the early 1870s that went through two changes from the original brass foil wrapped case (with 14 parts) to the drawn brass of two parts, the case and the primer. The .577/450 Martini–Henry was introduced with the Martini–Henry, in service it succeeded the .577 Snider cartridge and was used by all arms of the British armed forces, as well as British colonial forces, throughout the British Empire, until it was itself succeeded by the .303 British cartridge after an unsuccessful trial of a .402 calibre.

== Design ==
The .577/450 Martini–Henry is a rimmed, bottlenecked centerfire rifle cartridge derived from the .577 Snider; it was lengthened and bottlenecked. The .577/450 Martini–Henry was developed for use in the single shot Martini–Henry service rifle, which was originally loaded with blackpowder but later used cordite propellant.

=== Rifle cartridges ===
The various rifle cartridges fired a 480 gr (31 g) bullet made of an alloy of 1 part tin and 12 parts lead, driven by 85 gr (5.5 g) of RFG2 blackpowder and later 35.8 gr (2.32 g) of cordite size 3 at a muzzle velocity of 1,300 to 1,350 ft/s (400 to 410 m/s).

==== Coiled brass cases ====
The first .577/450 Martini–Henry rifle cartridge, the Cartridge S.A. Ball Rifle Breech-Loading Martini Henry Mark I, was made of coiled brass sheet .003 in (0.076 mm) thick with a strengthening strip of brass inside the coil and the body of the cartridge was riveted to the iron base disc and lined with thin white tissue paper. The smooth sided bullet was paper-patched with a thick cake of beeswax below the bullet with two cardboard discs above and a single one below.

As a matter of economy, the Mark I was replaced by the Cartridge S.A. Ball Rifle Breech-Loading Martini Henry Mark II which had a slightly thicker .004 in (0.10 mm) wall, no strengthening strip and a slightly longer base cap was added. The Mark II had a tendency to split at the base, so the Cartridge S.A. Ball Martini Henry Rifle Rolled Case Mark III was developed which had two layers of .004 in brass overlapped by .5 in (13 mm) with a .004 in brass strengthening strip with a small sight hole punched in the outer coil as a visual check that the strip was correctly placed and an inner and outer base cap turned over at the base.

As a result of complaints about the recoil compared to the Snider cartridge, Woolwich developed a lighter loading with a 410 gr (27 g) bullet driven by 80 gr (5.2 g) of blackpowder, the Cartridge S.A. Ball Martini Henry Rifle Rolled Case Mark IV. The Mark IV is visually identical to the Mark III and once removed from its bundle can only be identified by weight, it was produced in batches between 1873 and 1880 by which time complaints about the recoil had ceased, presumably as soldiers became accustomed to it, and later production reverted to the Mark III.

==== Drawn brass cases & cordite loadings ====
In service, the coiled brass cases proved to be fragile and prone to sticking in the chamber, so in 1885 a solid drawn brass case was introduced, the Cartridge S.A. Ball Martini Henry Rifle Solid Case Mark I. This was soon replaced by the Cartridge S.A. Ball Martini Henry Rifle Solid Case Mark II with a paper patch that did not extend so far up the bullet. The Mark II cartridge was replaced in British Army service by the .303 British from 1889, but remained in the service of colonial forces for many years.

In 1902 the use of cordite was approved for use in the .577/450 cartridge and the Cartridge S.A. Ball Martini Henry Rifle Solid Case Cordite Mark I was introduced the same year, with a similar cartridge case and bullet, but loaded with cordite.

=== Carbine cartridges ===
A reduced power load was produced for use in carbines, firing a 410 gr (27 g) bullet of the same alloy driven by 70 gr (4.5 g). The lighter carbine loading was less accurate, had a shorter range and less stopping power, but the two were interchangeable.

==== Coiled brass cases ====
The Cartridge S.A. Ball Carbine Breech-Loading Martini Henry Mark I was introduced in 1877, it shared the coiled brass case of the Mark III rifle cartridge with a cotton card taking up the unused space left by the use of less powder. In service the Mark I carbine cartridge was found to be inaccurate, so in 1878 the Cartridge S.A. Ball Carbine Breech-Loading Martini Henry Mark II was introduced, which replaced the cotton card with thicker paper lining. In 1879 the Cartridge S.A. Ball Carbine Breech-Loading Martini Henry Mark III was introduced, the major changes was to the paper patching of the bullet which included longitudinal slits to ensure it was discarded upon the bullet exiting the muzzle. The Mark III carbine cartridge remained in service for many years.

==== Drawn brass cases & cordite loadings ====
The introduction of solid drawn brass cases for rifle cartridges was followed in 1887 with the similar Cartridge S.A. Ball Martini Henry Carbine Solid Case Mark I solid drawn brass carbine cartridge, whilst it retained the same 410 gr bullet it had a heavier 85 gr (5.5 g) loading of blackpowder. Following the introduction of a cordite rifle cartridge, the Cartridge S.A. Ball Martini Henry Carbine Solid Case Cordite Mark I was introduced in 1903. It was propelled by 34 gr (2.2 g) of cordite, the other major difference was a green paper used to patch the bullet

=== Anti-airship cartridges ===
Prior to World War I, to combat the threat of Zeppelins it was determined that machine guns firing explosive or incendiary rounds were required to ignite the airship's gas. The bullet of the .303 British was too small to carry enough incendiary composition for the intended purpose, so the .577/450 round was adapted to the purpose and in 1914 the Cartridge S.A. Tracer Martini Henry Rifle and Machine Gun Mark I was introduced. This round used reclaimed drawn brass cases from rifle cartridges, firing a 270 gr (17 g) bullet made of a brass outer envelope containing 50 gr (3.2 g) of incendiary mix (20 parts potassium perchlorate and 7 parts aluminium) and 20 gr (1.3 g) of igniting mixture towards the tip. The cartridge was propelled by 47 gr (3.0 g) of cordite size 3 at a muzzle velocity of 2,150 ft/s (660 m/s).

In 1916 a tracer round was developed for the .577/450, the 295 gr (19.1 g) bullet comprised a cupronickel envelope containing 91 gr (5.9 g) of tracer element. The round was propelled by 40 to 50 gr (2.6 to 3.2 g) of cordite at a muzzle velocity of 2,000 ft/s (610 m/s).

=== Sporting cartridges ===
The .577/450 was also loaded with a variety of bullets designed for sporting use, including solid, hollow-pointed and copper-tubed bullets.

== History ==
The .577/450 Martini–Henry was introduced into British service in 1871 with the single-shot, dropping block Martini–Henry rifle, replacing the .577 Snider and the Snider–Enfield rifle.

=== Colonial service ===
The .577/450 Martini–Henry was first fired in combat on the Malay Peninsula in the Perak War of 1875–76, although the first widespread deployment of cartridge and the Martini-Henry rifle occurred in 1878, when it saw service in Southern Africa in the later stages of the Ninth Xhosa war, and later that year in Afghanistan in the Second Anglo-Afghan War. It was used by British forces throughout the Anglo-Zulu War, chambered in both the Martini–Henry and the Swinburn–Henry rifles, the latter a commercially produced rifle designed to avoid contravening the patent for the Martini action.

The .577/450 Martini–Henry, chambered in the Martini–Henry and later the Maxim gun, saw service throughout the British Empire. In Africa the cartridge saw combat in the Anglo-Zulu War, chambered in both the Martini–Henry and the Swinburn–Henry rifles, the latter a commercially produced rifle designed to avoid contravening the patent for the Martini action, the First Boer War, the Anglo–Sudan War, the Anglo-Egyptian War, the Emin Pasha Relief Expedition, and the First Matabele War, the cartridge continued to see widespread service throughout Africa even after the introduction of the .303 British, seeing service in the Second Boer War in both British and Boer hands.

The .577/450 Martini–Henry also saw service throughout the British Raj, Burma, the various Australian colonies, the Canadian Confederation, the Colony of New Zealand and throughout the Caribbean. The .577/450 Martini–Henry continued in service with various colonial police forces throughout Africa and India up to the First World War.

=== Great War and subsequent use ===
The .577/450 Martini–Henry was still in British military service in World War I, in the early stages of the war it was used by the Royal Flying Corps, both by observers and balloon busters. As late as the 2010s, Martini–Henry rifles have been seized in Taliban caches.

== Use ==
=== Service weapons chambering the .577/450 Martini–Henry ===
- Martini–Henry
- Swinburn–Henry
- Maxim gun
- Bira gun
- Civilian Martini-actioned sporting rifles

=== Sporting use ===
The .577/.450 lived on as a useful medium bore rifle for sporting or guard use long after it became militarily obsolete. Sporting rifles were made for the cartridge, and surplus military arms were sold off in the Third World (although not in India or the Sudan, where they were banned). The Martini Henry was particularly popular in the Middle East, and demand continued for the cartridges well into the 20th century.

Commercial sporting load. Because of ease of ammunition availability of the military cartridge .577/.450 sporting rifles or Cape guns (a combination double barreled rifle and shotgun) were popular with colonial settlers and army officers.

John Henry Patterson used a Martini .577/.450 to kill the second of the famous Man-Eating Lions of Tsavo.

== See also ==
- List of rifle cartridges
- 11×59mmR Gras
