= 1988–89 Brentford F.C. season =

English football team season

Brentford
1988–89 season
- Chairman: Martin Lange
- Player-manager: Steve Perryman
- Stadium: Griffin Park
- Third Division: 7th
- FA Cup: Sixth round
- League Cup: Second round
- Football League Trophy: Semi-final
- Top goalscorer: League: Cadette (12); All: Cadette (17)
- Highest home attendance: 12,100
- Lowest home attendance: 3,194
- Average home league attendance: 5,682
Home colours	Away colours

During the 1988–89 English football season, Brentford competed in the Football League Third Division. The gruelling 63-match season is best remembered for the Bees' run to the sixth round of the FA Cup. Brentford narrowly failed to qualify for the play-offs, but the club's final placing of 7th was its highest in the league pyramid since the 1964–65 season.

== Season summary ==
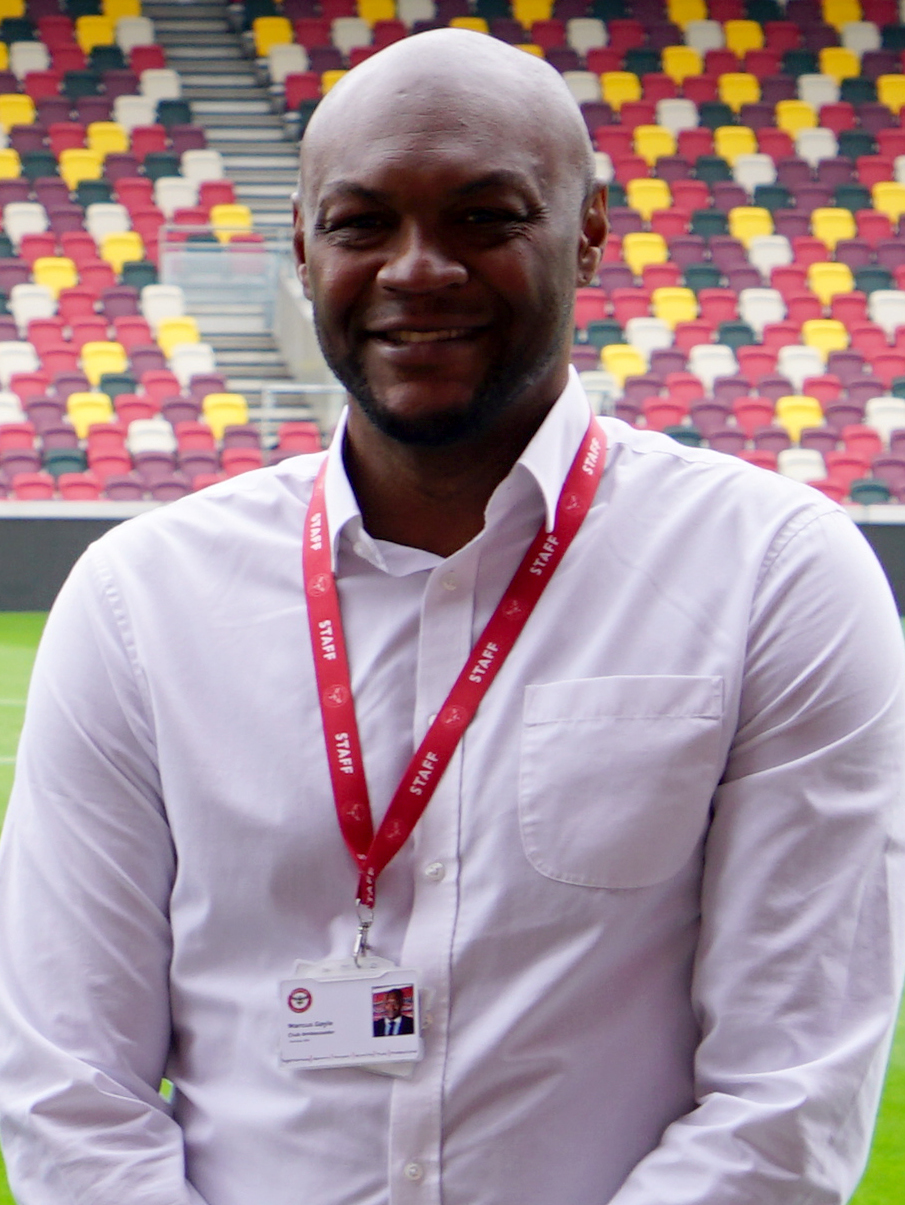
In October 1988, youth product Marcus Gayle made the first of 230 appearances across two spells with Brentford.

After a disappointing end to what was a positive first full season in charge, Brentford manager Steve Perryman identified that his principle starting XI would be complete with a creative winger and a reliable goalscoring forward. Perryman broke the Bees' incoming transfer record by spending £77,500 on Sheffield United forward Richard Cadette in July 1988. Perryman brought experienced winger Neil Smillie back to Griffin Park, 11 years after Smillie had initially played for the Bees on loan. Also arriving at Griffin Park was goalkeeper Tony Parks from Tottenham Hotspur for a £60,000 fee and replaced Gary Phillips, who joined Reading for £25,000. On the eve of the season, right back Roger Joseph, who had been named in the 1987–88 Third Division PFA Team of the Year, joined Wimbledon for a new club record outgoing transfer fee of £150,000.

Brentford enjoyed one of the most exciting seasons in years, producing some notable results in both the Third Division and the cup competitions. The Bees trod water in mid-table for most of the season, before a run of eight wins and two draws from a 10-match spell in March and April 1989 raised the club to 7th position, one place outside the play-off zone, despite the club record £350,000 sale of influential midfielder Andy Sinton to Queens Park Rangers. Two consecutive defeats in early May left Brentford in 9th place, still with a chance of a play-off finish going into the final two matches of the season, but a 1–1 draw with Swansea City at Griffin Park in the penultimate match of the season ended any mathematical chances. Despite drawing the final match of the season, defeats for former play-off-contending rivals Chester City and Notts County raised Brentford to a credible 7th-place finish.

In the cup competitions, Brentford advanced to the second round of the League Cup and the Southern Area semi-finals of the Football League Trophy. Notably the Bees faced local rivals Fulham in both competitions and in the Third Division, winning two, drawing two and losing one of the five matches between the sides during the season. In the FA Cup, Brentford advanced to the sixth round for the first time since the 1948–49 season. Non-league club Halesowen Town were dispatched in the first round, but it took replays to see off Peterborough United and Walsall in the second and third rounds respectively. The Bees faced high-flying Second Division club Manchester City in the fourth round at a sold-out Griffin Park and emerged 3–1 victors thanks to a Gary Blissett brace and one goal from Keith Jones. Brentford also drew promotion-chasing Second Division opposition in the fifth round – Blackburn Rovers at Ewood Park. 3,000 travelling supporters watched Brentford hold Rovers at 0–0 until the 80th minute, when Gary Blissett scored the first of the only two goals of the match to put the Bees into the hat for the sixth round. Brentford were drawn against First Division giants Liverpool at Anfield, for a match which would be one of the club's biggest occasions of the postwar era. Steve McMahon opened the scoring after 15 minutes and the Bees held firm until midway through the second half, when three Liverpool goals in a 16-minute spell saw the match finish with an unflattering 4–0 scoreline.

Central defender Terry Evans missed just one match during the season and finished with 62 appearances, the club record for a player in a single season.

== League table ==
Pos	Team	Pld	W	D	L	GF	GA	GD	Pts	Promotion or relegation
5	Bristol Rovers	46	19	17	10	67	51	+16	74	Qualification for the Third Division play-offs
6	Preston North End	46	19	15	12	79	60	+19	72	Qualification for the Third Division play-offs
7	Brentford	46	18	14	14	66	61	+5	68	
8	Chester City	46	19	11	16	64	61	+3	68	
9	Notts County	46	18	13	15	64	54	+10	67	

== Results ==
Brentford's goal tally listed first.

=== Legend ===
Win	Draw	Loss

=== Pre-season ===
Date	Opponent	Venue	Result	Attendance	Scorer(s)	Notes
23 July 1988	Barreirense	N	1–2	n/a	Sinton	(Note: Alliance Cup.)
25 July 1988	Estoril	N	0–1	n/a		
27 July 1988	Montijo	N	4–3	n/a	Pyle (2), Cockram, Obi	
29 July 1988	Estrela da Amadora	N	1–0	n/a	Cadette	
13 August 1988	Orient	A	4–1	n/a	Birch (2), Sinton (pen), Jones	
15 August 1988	Maidenhead United	A	3–0	612	Cadette (2), Feeley	
19 August 1988	Bournemouth	H	1–0	1,117	Blissett	

=== Football League Third Division ===
No.	Date	Opponent	Venue	Result	Attendance	Scorer(s)
1	27 August 1988	Huddersfield Town	H	1–0	5,016	Cockram
2	3 September 1988	Northampton Town	A	0–1	4,488	
3	10 September 1988	Wigan Athletic	H	1–1	4,081	Blissett
4	17 September 1988	Swansea City	A	1–1	5,015	Millen
5	21 September 1988	Bristol Rovers	A	2–1	3,836	Cadette (2)
6	24 September 1988	Sheffield United	H	1–4	6,577	Sinton (pen)
7	1 October 1988	Gillingham	H	1–0	4,839	Sinton (pen)
8	5 October 1988	Chester City	A	2–3	1,999	Blissett, Cadette
9	9 October 1988	Southend United	H	4–0	5,016	Evans, Sinton (2), Cockram
10	15 October 1988	Bury	A	1–3	2,359	Cockram
11	22 October 1988	Preston North End	H	0–2	5,584	
12	25 October 1988	Chesterfield	A	2–2	1,876	Cadette (2)
13	29 October 1988	Port Vale	H	2–1	5,212	Jones, Holdsworth
14	5 November 1988	Reading	A	2–2	7,974	Sinton (2, 1 pen)
15	8 November 1988	Notts County	H	2–1	4,013	Cadette (2)
16	21 November 1988	Mansfield Town	A	0–1	3,196	
17	25 November 1988	Cardiff City	A	0–1	3,405	
18	3 December 1988	Bolton Wanderers	H	3–0	4,628	Cadette (2), Evans
19	18 December 1988	Aldershot	A	0–0	4,012	
20	26 December 1988	Blackpool	H	1–0	6,021	Sinton
21	31 December 1988	Wolverhampton Wanderers	H	2–2	8,020	Godfrey, Jones
22	2 January 1989	Fulham	A	3–3	8,120	Sinton, Godfrey, Cadette
23	14 January 1989	Northampton Town	H	2–0	6,043	Cadette, Stanislaus
24	21 January 1989	Wigan Athletic	A	1–1	2,514	Sinton
25	4 February 1989	Gillingham	A	0–0	4,002	
26	11 February 1989	Chester City	H	0–1	5,748	
27	25 February 1989	Bury	H	2–2	6,077	Godfrey, Blissett
28	28 February 1989	Chesterfield	H	1–0	4,192	Cadette
29	4 March 1989	Preston North End	A	3–5	8,191	Ratcliffe, Bates, Godfrey
30	11 March 1989	Reading	H	3–2	6,866	Millen, Evans, Sinton (pen)
31	13 March 1989	Port Vale	A	2–3	5,577	Godfrey, Millen
32	24 March 1989	Fulham	H	0–1	10,851	
33	27 March 1989	Blackpool	A	3–0	3,305	Godfrey, Cockram (2, 1 pen)
34	1 April 1989	Aldershot	H	2–1	5,200	Jones, Sealy
35	4 April 1989	Bristol City	H	3–0	4,627	Sealy (2), Cockram (pen)
36	8 April 1989	Wolverhampton Wanderers	A	0–2	14,356	
37	11 April 1989	Bristol City	A	1–0	4,339	Evans
38	15 April 1989	Bristol Rovers	H	2–1	7,558	Blissett, Smillie
39	18 April 1989	Southend United	A	1–1	4,194	Smillie
40	22 April 1989	Sheffield United	A	2–2	12,613	Sealy, Godfrey
41	25 April 1989	Huddersfield Town	A	2–1	3,538	Godfrey, Blissett
42	29 April 1989	Mansfield Town	H	1–0	5,231	Cockram
43	1 May 1989	Notts County	A	0–3	4,989	
44	6 May 1989	Bolton Wanderers	A	2–4	4,627	Ansah (2)
45	9 May 1989	Swansea City	H	1–1	4,415	Blissett
46	13 May 1989	Cardiff City	H	1–1	4,865	Evans

=== FA Cup ===
Round	Date	Opponent	Venue	Result	Attendance	Scorer(s)
1R	19 November 1988	Halesowen Town	H	2–0	4,514	Evans, Sinton
2R	10 December 1988	Peterborough United	A	0–0	5,609	
2R (replay)	14 December 1988	Peterborough United	H	3–2	5,605	Cadette, Cockram, Smillie
3R	7 January 1989	Walsall	A	1–1	5,375	Jones
3R (replay)	10 January 1989	Walsall	H	1–0	8,163	Cockram
4R	28 January 1989	Manchester City	H	3–1	12,100	Blissett (2), Jones
5R	18 February 1989	Blackburn Rovers	A	2–0	15,280	Blissett (2)
6R	18 March 1989	Liverpool	A	0–4	42,376	

=== Football League Cup ===
Round	Date	Opponent	Venue	Result	Attendance	Scorer(s)
R1 (1st leg)	30 August 1988	Fulham	A	2–2	5,489	Sinton, Stanislaus
R1 (2nd leg)	6 September 1988	Fulham	H	1–0 (won 3–2 on aggregate)	7,707	Blissett
R2 (1st leg)	27 September 1988	Blackburn Rovers	A	1–3	4,606	Blissett
R2 (2nd leg)	12 October 1988	Blackburn Rovers	H	4–3 (lost 5–6 on aggregate)	3,844	Cadette (2), Sinton, Jones

=== Football League Trophy ===
Round	Date	Opponent	Venue	Result	Attendance	Scorer
SPR (match 1)	22 November 1988	Fulham	A	2–0	2,376	Blissett, Cadette
SPR (match 2)	29 November 1988	Gillingham	H	2–0	3,713	Blissett, Cockram
SR1	17 January 1989	Notts County	H	2–0	3,194	Godfrey, Cadette
SQF	21 February 1989	Chesterfield	A	1–0	4,207	Cadette
SSF	21 March 1989	Torquay United	H	0–1	5,802	

- Sources: 100 Years of Brentford, The Big Brentford Book of the Eighties, Statto

== Playing squad ==
Players' ages are as of the opening day of the 1988–89 season.

Pos.	Name	Nat.	Date of birth (age)	Signed from	Signed in	Notes
Goalkeepers
GK	Tony Parks	(England)	26 January 1963 (aged 25)	Tottenham Hotspur	1988	
GK	Jeremy Roberts	(England)	24 November 1966 (aged 21)	Darlington	1988	
Defenders
DF	Jamie Bates	(England)	24 February 1968 (aged 20)	Youth	1986	
DF	John Buttigieg	(Malta)	5 October 1963 (aged 24)	Sliema Wanderers	1988	
DF	Jason Cousins	(England)	4 October 1970 (aged 17)	Youth	1989	
DF	Terry Evans	(England)	12 April 1965 (aged 23)	Hillingdon	1985	
DF	Andy Feeley	(England)	30 September 1961 (aged 26)	Leicester City	1987	
DF	Marcus Gayle	(Jamaica)	27 September 1970 (aged 17)	Youth	1988	
DF	Colin Lee	(England)	12 June 1956 (aged 32)	Chelsea	1987	Youth Development Officer
DF	Keith Millen	(England)	26 September 1966 (aged 21)	Youth	1985	
DF	Graham Pearce	(England)	8 July 1959 (aged 29)	Farnborough Town	1988	
DF	Roger Stanislaus	(England)	2 November 1968 (aged 19)	Arsenal	1987	
Midfielders
MF	Allan Cockram	(England)	8 October 1963 (aged 24)	St Albans City	1988	
MF	Andy Driscoll	(England)	21 October 1971 (aged 16)	Youth	1989	
MF	Kevin Godfrey	(England)	24 February 1960 (aged 28)	Leyton Orient	1988	
MF	Keith Jones (c)	(England)	14 October 1965 (aged 22)	Chelsea	1987	
MF	Steve Perryman	(England)	21 December 1951 (aged 36)	Oxford United	1986	Manager
MF	Simon Ratcliffe	(England)	8 February 1967 (aged 21)	Norwich City	1989	
MF	Neil Smillie	(England)	19 July 1958 (aged 30)	Reading	1988	
Forwards
FW	Andy Ansah	(England)	19 March 1969 (aged 19)	Dorking	1989	
FW	Gary Blissett	(England)	29 May 1964 (aged 24)	Crewe Alexandra	1987	
FW	Richard Cadette	(England)	21 March 1965 (aged 23)	Sheffield United	1988	
FW	Jon Purdie	(England)	22 February 1967 (aged 21)	Oxford United	1989	Loaned from Oxford United before transferring permanently
FW	Tony Sealy	(England)	7 May 1959 (aged 29)	Unattached	1989	
Players who left the club mid-season
GK	John Smeulders	(England)	28 March 1957 (aged 31)	Bournemouth	1988	Returned to Bournemouth after loan
MF	Bob Booker	(England)	25 January 1958 (aged 30)	Bedmond Sports & Social	1978	Transferred to Sheffield United
MF	Andy Sinton	(England)	19 March 1966 (aged 22)	Cambridge United	1985	Transferred to Queens Park Rangers
FW	Paul Birch	(England)	3 December 1968 (aged 19)	Portsmouth	1987	Retired
FW	Dean Holdsworth	(England)	8 November 1968 (aged 19)	Watford	1988	Returned to Watford after loan

- Sources: The Big Brentford Book of the Eighties, Timeless Bees

== Coaching staff ==
Name	Role
(England) Steve Perryman	Manager
(England) Phil Holder	Assistant manager
(England) Roy Clare	Physiotherapist

== Statistics ==
=== Appearances and goals ===
Substitute appearances in brackets.

Pos	Nat	Name	League		FA Cup		League Cup		FL Trophy		Total	
Pos	Nat	Name	Apps	Goals	Apps	Goals	Apps	Goals	Apps	Goals	Apps	Goals
GK	(England)	Tony Parks	33	0	7	0	3	0	2	0	45	0
GK	(England)	Jeremy Roberts	5	0	1	0	0	0	3	0	9	0
DF	(England)	Jamie Bates	31 (5)	1	1 (1)	0	2 (1)	0	2	0	36 (7)	1
DF	(Malta)	John Buttigieg	12 (6)	0	0 (1)	0	—		0	0	12 (7)	0
DF	(England)	Terry Evans	45	5	8	1	4	0	5	0	62	6
DF	(England)	Andy Feeley	30 (3)	0	8	0	2 (1)	0	5	0	45 (4)	0
DF	(Jamaica)	Marcus Gayle	0 (3)	0	0	0	0	0	0	0	0 (3)	0
DF	(England)	Colin Lee	1 (1)	0	0	0	0	0	0 (1)	0	1 (2)	0
DF	(England)	Keith Millen	36	3	8	0	4	0	5	0	53	3
DF	(England)	Graham Pearce	11 (7)	0	2 (1)	0	—		1	0	14 (8)	0
DF	(England)	Roger Stanislaus	42 (1)	1	6	0	4	1	2	0	55 (1)	2
MF	(England)	Bob Booker	5 (3)	0	—		1 (1)	0	—		6 (4)	0
MF	(England)	Allan Cockram	31 (6)	7	6 (1)	2	3	0	3 (1)	1	43 (8)	10
MF	(England)	Andy Driscoll	0 (1)	0	0	0	0	0	0	0	0 (1)	0
MF	(England)	Kevin Godfrey	24 (5)	8	5 (2)	0	—		4 (1)	1	33 (8)	9
MF	(England)	Keith Jones	40	3	8	2	4	1	4	0	56	6
MF	(England)	Steve Perryman	2 (3)	0	0 (2)	0	0 (1)	0	1	0	3 (6)	0
MF	(England)	Simon Ratcliffe	7 (2)	1	1 (1)	0	—		1 (1)	0	9 (4)	1
MF	(England)	Andy Sinton	31	10	7	1	4	2	5	0	47	13
MF	(England)	Neil Smillie	25 (3)	2	6	1	4	0	2	0	37 (3)	3
FW	(England)	Andy Ansah	3 (4)	2	—		—		—		3 (4)	2
FW	(England)	Paul Birch	0 (2)	0	—		0 (1)	0	—		0 (3)	0
FW	(England)	Gary Blissett	35 (1)	6	6	4	4	2	4	3	49 (1)	15
FW	(England)	Richard Cadette	31 (1)	12	8	1	4	2	5	2	48 (1)	17
FW	(England)	Jon Purdie	5 (1)	0	—		—		—		5 (1)	0
FW	(England)	Tony Sealy	11 (1)	4	0 (1)	0	—		0 (1)	0	11 (3)	4
Players loaned in during the season
GK	(England)	John Smeulders	8	0	—		1	0	—		9	0
FW	(England)	Dean Holdsworth	2 (5)	1	—		—		—		2 (5)	1

- Players listed in italics left the club mid-season.
- Source: The Big Brentford Book of the Eighties

=== Goalscorers ===
Pos.	Nat	Player	FL3	FAC	FLC	FLT	Total
FW	(England)	Richard Cadette	12	1	2	2	17
FW	(England)	Gary Blissett	6	4	2	3	15
MF	(England)	Andy Sinton	10	1	2	0	13
MF	(England)	Allan Cockram	7	2	0	1	10
MF	(England)	Kevin Godfrey	8	0	—	1	9
DF	(England)	Terry Evans	5	1	0	0	6
MF	(England)	Keith Jones	3	2	1	0	6
FW	(England)	Tony Sealy	4	0	—	0	4
DF	(England)	Keith Millen	3	0	0	0	3
MF	(England)	Neil Smillie	2	1	0	0	3
FW	(England)	Andy Ansah	2	—	—	—	2
DF	(England)	Roger Stanislaus	1	0	1	0	2
FW	(England)	Dean Holdsworth	1	—	—	—	1
MF	(England)	Simon Ratcliffe	1	0	—	0	1
DF	(England)	Jamie Bates	1	0	0	0	1
Total			66	12	8	7	93

- Players listed in italics left the club mid-season.
- Source: The Big Brentford Book of the Eighties

=== Management ===
Name	Nat	From	To	Record All Comps					Record League				
Name	Nat	From	To	P	W	D	L	W %	P	W	D	L	W %
Steve Perryman	(England)	27 August 1988	13 May 1989	63	29	17	17	46.03	46	18	14	14	39.13

=== Summary ===
Games played	63 (46 Third Division, 8 FA Cup, 4 League Cup, 5 Football League Trophy)
Games won	29 (18 Third Division, 5 FA Cup, 2 League Cup, 4 Football League Trophy)
Games drawn	17 (14 Third Division, 2 FA Cup, 1 League Cup, 0 Football League Trophy)
Games lost	17 (14 Third Division, 1 FA Cup, 1 League Cup, 1 Football League Trophy)
Goals scored	93 (66 Third Division, 12 FA Cup, 8 League Cup, 7 Football League Trophy)
Goals conceded	84 (61 Third Division, 8 FA Cup, 8 League Cup, 7 Football League Trophy)
Clean sheets	22 (13 Third Division, 4 FA Cup, 1 League Cup, 4 Football League Trophy)
Biggest league win	4–0 versus Southend United, 9 October 1988
Worst league defeat	3–0 versus Notts County, 1 May 1989; 4–1 versus Sheffield United, 24 September 1988; 5–3 versus Preston North End, 4 March 1989
Most appearances	62, Terry Evans (45 Third Division, 8 FA Cup, 4 League Cup, 5 Football League Trophy)
Top scorer (league)	12, Richard Cadette
Top scorer (all competitions)	17, Richard Cadette

== Transfers & loans ==
Players transferred in
Date	Pos.	Name	Previous club	Fee	Ref.
July 1988	FW	(England) Richard Cadette	(England) Sheffield United	£77,500	
August 1988	GK	(England) Tony Parks	(England) Tottenham Hotspur	£60,000	
August 1988	MF	(England) Neil Smillie	(England) Reading	Free	
September 1988	GK	(England) Jeremy Roberts	(England) Darlington	Non-contract	
October 1988	MF	(England) Kevin Godfrey	(England) Leyton Orient	Non-contract	
October 1988	FW	(England) Graham Pearce	(England) Farnborough Town	Non-contract	
2 November 1988	DF	(Malta) John Buttigieg	(Malta) Sliema Wanderers	£40,000	
1988	GK	(England) Ashley Bayes	n/a	n/a	
1988	FW	(England) Kelly Haag	n/a	n/a	
1988	MF	(England) Khotso Moabi	n/a	n/a	
January 1989	MF	(England) Simon Ratcliffe	(England) Norwich City	£100,000	
March 1989	FW	(England) Andy Ansah	(England) Dorking	n/a	
March 1989	FW	(England) Tony Sealy	Unattached	Free	
April 1989	FW	(England) Jon Purdie	(England) Oxford United	n/a	
Players loaned in
Date from	Pos.	Name	From	Date to	Ref.
October 1988	FW	(England) Dean Holdsworth	(England) Watford	November 1988	
October 1988	GK	(England) John Smeulders	(England) Bournemouth	November 1988	
March 1989	MF	(England) Jon Purdie	(England) Oxford United	April 1989	
Players transferred out
Date	Pos.	Name	Subsequent club	Fee	Ref.
August 1988	DF	(England) Roger Joseph	(England) Wimbledon	£150,000	
August 1988	GK	(England) Gary Phillips	(England) Reading	£25,000	
November 1988	MF	(England) Bob Booker	(England) Sheffield United	Free	
March 1989	MF	(England) Andy Sinton	(England) Queens Park Rangers	£350,000	
Players released
Date	Pos.	Name	Subsequent club	Join date	Ref.
August 1988	MF	(England) Wayne Turner	(England) Barnet	1988	
October 1988	FW	(England) Paul Birch	Retired		
1988	MF	(England) Robbie Carroll	(England) Fareham Town	1988	
1988	GK	(England) Tony Oliver	(England) Weymouth	1988	
May 1989	DF	(England) Andy Feeley	(England) Bury	July 1989	
May 1989	DF	(England) Colin Lee	Retired		
May 1989	FW	(England) Graham Pearce	(England) Maidstone United	1989	
May 1989	FW	(England) Jon Purdie	(England) Shrewsbury Town	June 1989	
May 1989	GK	(England) Jeremy Roberts	(England) Maidenhead United	1989	
May 1989	FW	(England) Tony Sealy	(England) Swindon Town	1 September 1989	

== Kit ==
Supplier: Hobot
Sponsor(s): KLM

Home	Away

Source: Brentford F.C.

== Awards ==
- Supporters' Player of the Year: Terry Evans
- Players' Player of the Year: Terry Evans
- Football League Third Division Manager of the Month: Steve Perryman (February 1989)
- Evening Standard Player of the Month: Terry Evans (January 1989), Gary Blissett (February 1989)
