= 1991–92 Brentford F.C. season =

English football team season

Brentford
1991–92 season
- Chairman: Martin Lange
- Manager: Phil Holder
- Stadium: Griffin Park
- Third Division: 1st (promoted)
- FA Cup: Second round
- League Cup: Third round
- Football League Trophy: First round
- Top goalscorer: League: Holdsworth (24); All: Holdsworth (38)
- Highest home attendance: 12,071
- Lowest home attendance: 4,586
- Average home league attendance: 7,156
Home colours	Away colours

During the 1991–92 English football season, Brentford competed in the Football League Third Division. The club finished the season as champions to seal second-tier football for the first time since 1953–54. In 2013, it was voted as Brentford's best ever season by the club's supporters.

== Season summary ==
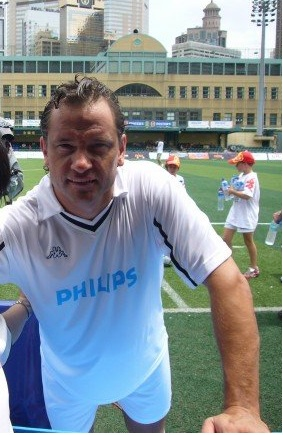
Dean Holdsworth's 38 goals during the season was one shy of Jack Holliday's club record.

After defeat to Tranmere Rovers in the 1991 Third Division play-offs, Brentford manager Phil Holder made just one addition to his squad prior to the beginning of the 1991–92 season, in the shape of £60,000 defender Billy Manuel from Gillingham. Two wins from the opening two league matches of the season put Brentford in the automatic promotion places, but three successive defeats dropped the club back to 16th by early September 1991. Aided by on-fire forward Dean Holdsworth, the Bees won 13, drew three and lost three of the following 19 matches, losing just once in the league. Having reached the top spot in the Third Division after a 4–0 victory over Wigan Athletic on 9 November, the club stayed at the summit until 8 February 1992, when a fifth defeat in 9 matches dropped the club back to third.

Brentford vied with Birmingham City and Stoke City in the automatic promotion places between mid-February and mid-March, but four successive defeats and two draws dropped the Bees back to 4th. Six wins in the final six matches of the season (which included a 4–0 victory over West London rivals Fulham at Griffin Park) saw Brentford claim the Third Division championship on the final day, after a Gary Blissett goal was enough to beat Peterborough United at London Road. Dean Holdsworth's 24 league goals tied him with Huddersfield Town's Iwan Roberts as the top scorer in the Third Division and Holdsworth's total of 38 in all competitions was one goal short of Jack Holliday's club record, set during the 1932–33 season, when Brentford had last been promoted out of the Third Division.

== League table ==
Pos	Team	Pld	W	D	L	GF	GA	GD	Pts	Promotion or relegation
1	Brentford (C, P)	46	25	7	14	81	55	+26	82	Promotion to the First Division (Note: From the 1992–93 season, the second tier - then known as the Second Division - was renamed to the First Division, the third tier - then known as the Third Division - was renamed to the Second Division, and the fourth tier - then known as the Fourth Division - was renamed to the Third Division.)
2	Birmingham City (P)	46	23	12	11	69	52	+17	81	Promotion to the First Division
3	Huddersfield Town	46	22	12	12	59	38	+21	78	Qualification for the Third Division play-offs
4	Stoke City	46	21	14	11	69	49	+20	77	Qualification for the Third Division play-offs
5	Stockport County	46	22	10	14	75	51	+24	76	Qualification for the Third Division play-offs

(C) Champions; (P) Promoted

== Results ==
Brentford's goal tally listed first.

=== Legend ===
Win	Draw	Loss

=== Pre-season ===
Date	Opponent	Venue	Result	Attendance	Scorer(s)
27 July 1991	Staines Town	A	2–0	n/a	Godfrey, Holdsworth (pen)
30 July 1991	Portsmouth	H	0–2	1,231	
3 August 1991	Enfield	A	1–1	n/a	Smilie
6 August 1991	Chelsea	H	4–3	4,923	Cadette (2), Holdsworth, Smilie
7 August 1991	Maidenhead United	A	2–3	n/a	Line, untraced (og)
10 August 1991	Colchester United	A	3–1	n/a	Luscombe, Godfrey, Gayle
12 August 1991	Chesham United	A	4–3	n/a	Cadette (2), Blissett (pen), Ratcliffe

=== Football League Third Division ===
No.	Date	Opponent	Venue	Result	Attendance	Scorer(s)
1	17 August 1991	Leyton Orient	H	4–3	6,156	Holdsworth (3), Evans
2	24 August 1991	Exeter City	A	2–1	3,518	Gayle, Blissett
3	31 August 1991	Huddersfield Town	H	2–3	5,459	Jones, Godfrey
4	3 September 1991	Hartlepool United	A	0–1	3,660	
5	7 September 1991	Shrewsbury Town	A	0–1	3,139	
6	14 September 1991	Reading	H	1–0	5,775	Cadette
7	17 September 1991	Hull City	H	4–1	4,586	Evans, Smilie, untraced (og), Holdsworth
8	21 September 1991	Darlington	A	2–1	3,900	Smilie, Holdsworth
9	28 September 1991	Bolton Wanderers	H	3–2	5,658	Holdsworth (2), Gayle
10	5 October 1991	Fulham	A	1–0	7,710	Evans
11	12 October 1991	Peterborough United	H	2–1	7,705	Evans, Smilie
12	19 October 1991	West Bromwich Albion	H	1–2	8,575	Gayle
13	26 October 1991	Bury	A	3–0	2,280	Holdsworth (2), Gayle
14	2 November 1991	Bradford City	A	1–0	5,359	Smilie
15	6 November 1991	Birmingham City	H	2–2	8,798	Smilie, Blissett
16	9 November 1991	Wigan Athletic	H	4–0	6,675	Blissett (2), Holdsworth (2)
17	22 November 1991	Bournemouth	A	0–0	4,764	
18	30 November 1991	Swansea City	H	3–2	6,669	Holdsworth, Ratcliffe, Blissett
19	14 December 1991	Torquay United	A	1–1	2,475	Godfrey
20	22 December 1991	Exeter City	H	3–0	7,226	Blissett (2), Gayle
21	26 December 1991	Huddersfield Town	A	1–2	10,605	Blissett (pen)
22	28 December 1991	Leyton Orient	A	2–4	7,333	Luscombe (2)
23	1 January 1992	Hartlepool United	H	1–0	7,102	Holdsworth
24	4 January 1992	Stockport County	A	1–2	4,421	Untraced (og)
25	11 January 1992	Stoke City	H	2–0	9,004	Luscombe, Holdsworth
26	18 January 1992	Chester City	A	1–1	1,447	Booker
27	25 January 1992	Preston North End	H	1–0	7,559	Evans
28	1 February 1992	West Bromwich Albion	A	0–2	15,984	
29	8 February 1992	Bury	H	0–3	6,789	
30	11 February 1992	Swansea City	A	1–1	3,582	Millen
31	15 February 1992	Torquay United	H	3–2	6,079	Booker, Blissett, Bates
32	22 February 1992	Stoke City	A	1–2	16,417	Blissett
33	29 February 1992	Stockport County	H	2–1	7,484	Smilie, Holdsworth
34	3 March 1992	Chester City	H	2–0	6,869	Blissett, Holdsworth (pen)
35	7 March 1992	Preston North End	A	2–3	3,548	Smilie, Buckle
36	10 March 1992	Birmingham City	A	0–1	13,290	
37	14 March 1992	Bradford City	H	3–4	6,791	Evans, Blissett, Holdsworth
38	20 March 1992	Wigan Athletic	A	1–2	2,371	Holdsworth
39	29 March 1992	Bournemouth	H	2–2	7,605	Godfrey, Blissett
40	1 April 1992	Reading	A	0–0	5,660	
41	4 April 1992	Shrewsbury Town	H	2–0	5,561	Holdsworth, Evans
42	11 April 1992	Hull City	A	3–0	3,770	Holdsworth (2), Blissett
43	17 April 1992	Darlington	H	4–1	8,383	Holdsworth (2), Blissett, untraced (og)
44	20 April 1992	Bolton Wanderers	A	2–1	4,382	Evans, untraced (og)
45	26 April 1992	Fulham	H	4–0	12,071	Holdsworth, Gayle, Blissett, Ratcliffe
46	2 May 1992	Peterborough United	A	1–0	14,539	Blissett

=== FA Cup ===
Round	Date	Opponent	Venue	Result	Attendance	Scorer(s)
R1	18 November 1991	Gillingham	H	3–3	5,830	Holdsworth (2), Blissett
R1 (replay)	26 November 1991	Gillingham	A	3–1	7,328	Holdsworth (2), Sealy
R2	7 December 1991	Bournemouth	A	1–2	6,538	Bates

=== League Cup ===
Round	Date	Opponent	Venue	Result	Attendance	Scorer(s)
R1 (1st leg)	20 August 1991	Barnet	A	5–5	2,416	Cadette (2), Godfrey, Holdsworth (2)
R1 (2nd leg)	27 August 1991	Barnet	H	3–1 (won 8–6 on aggregate)	5,583	Holdsworth, Godfrey, Evans
R2 (1st leg)	24 September 1991	Brighton & Hove Albion	H	4–1	4,927	Godfrey, Cadette, Holdsworth (2)
R2 (2nd leg)	9 October 1991	Brighton & Hove Albion	A	2–4 (a.e.t.), won 6–5 on aggregate)	4,502	Cadette, Holdsworth
R3	30 October 1991	Norwich City	A	1–4	7,394	Manuel

=== Football League Trophy ===
Round	Date	Opponent	Venue	Result	Attendance	Scorer(s)
PR	22 October 1991	Aldershot	A	2–0	1,348	Sealy (2)
PR	17 December 1991	Barnet	H	3–6	1,871	Luscombe, Holdsworth (2)
SR1	21 January 1992	Leyton Orient	A	2–3	1,861	Holdsworth (2)

- Source: Statto, 11v11, The Big Brentford Book Of The Nineties

== Playing squad ==
Players' ages are as of the opening day of the 1991–92 season.

Pos.	Name	Nat.	Date of birth (age)	Signed from	Signed in	Notes
Goalkeepers
GK	Ashley Bayes	(England)	19 April 1972 (aged 19)	Youth	1990	
GK	Graham Benstead	(England)	20 August 1963 (aged 27)	Sheffield United	1990	
Defenders
DF	Jamie Bates	(England)	24 February 1968 (aged 23)	Youth	1986	
DF	Terry Evans (c)	(England)	12 April 1965 (aged 26)	Hillingdon	1985	
DF	Chris Hughton	(Republic of Ireland)	11 December 1958 (aged 32)	West Ham United	1992	Coach
DF	Billy Manuel	(England)	28 June 1969 (aged 22)	Gillingham	1991	
DF	Keith Millen	(England)	26 September 1966 (aged 24)	Youth	1985	
DF	Brian Statham	(England)	21 May 1969 (aged 22)	Tottenham Hotspur	1992	Loaned from Tottenham Hotspur before transferring permanently
Midfielders
MF	Bob Booker	(England)	25 January 1958 (aged 33)	Sheffield United	1991	
MF	Paul Buckle	(England)	16 December 1970 (aged 20)	Youth	1988	
MF	Andy Driscoll	(England)	21 October 1971 (aged 19)	Youth	1989	Loaned to Staines Town
MF	Tony Finnigan	(England)	17 October 1962 (aged 28)	Swindon Town	1991	
MF	Kevin Godfrey	(England)	24 February 1960 (aged 31)	Leyton Orient	1988	
MF	Detzi Kruszyński	(Poland)	14 October 1960 (aged 30)	Wimbledon	1992	On loan from Wimbledon
MF	Robbie Peters	(England)	18 May 1971 (aged 20)	Youth	1989	
MF	Simon Ratcliffe	(England)	8 February 1967 (aged 24)	Norwich City	1989	
MF	Wilf Rostron	(England)	29 September 1956 (aged 34)	Sheffield United	1991	Assistant manager
MF	Neil Smilie	(England)	19 July 1958 (aged 33)	Reading	1988	
Forwards
FW	Gary Blissett	(England)	29 June 1964 (aged 27)	Crewe Alexandra	1987	
FW	Marcus Gayle	(Jamaica)	27 September 1970 (aged 20)	Youth	1988	
FW	Dean Holdsworth	(England)	8 November 1968 (aged 22)	Watford	1989	
FW	Simon Line	(England)	1 November 1971 (aged 19)	Crystal Palace	1991	
FW	Lee Luscombe	(England)	16 July 1971 (aged 20)	Southampton	1991	
FW	Tony Sealy	(England)	7 May 1959 (aged 32)	MYPA	1991	
Players who left the club mid-season
GK	Perry Suckling	(England)	12 October 1965 (aged 25)	Crystal Palace	1991	Returned to Crystal Palace after loan
MF	Keith Jones	(England)	14 October 1965 (aged 25)	Chelsea	1987	Transferred to Southend United
FW	Richard Cadette	(England)	21 March 1965 (aged 26)	Sheffield United	1988	Transferred to Falkirk

- Source: The Big Brentford Book Of The Nineties

== Coaching staff ==
Name	Role
(England) Phil Holder	Manager
(England) Wilf Rostron	Assistant Manager
(England) Graham Pearce	Coach
(Republic of Ireland) Chris Hughton	Coach
(England) Gordon Phillips	Goalkeeping Coach
(England) Roy Clare	Physiotherapist

== Statistics ==
=== Appearances and goals ===
Substitute appearances in brackets.

Pos	Nat	Name	League		FA Cup		League Cup		FL Trophy		Total	
Pos	Nat	Name	Apps	Goals	Apps	Goals	Apps	Goals	Apps	Goals	Apps	Goals
GK	(England)	Ashley Bayes	1	0	2	0	3	0	0	0	6	0
GK	(England)	Graham Benstead	37	0	1	0	2	0	2	0	42	0
DF	(England)	Jamie Bates	41 (1)	1	3	1	5	0	2	0	51 (1)	2
DF	(England)	Terry Evans	44	8	3	0	5	1	2	0	54	9
DF	(Republic of Ireland)	Chris Hughton	12	0	—		—		—		12	0
DF	(England)	Billy Manuel	27 (8)	0	3	0	5	1	2	0	37 (8)	1
DF	(England)	Keith Millen	34	1	3	0	2	0	2	0	41	1
DF	(England)	Brian Statham	18	0	—		—		—		18	0
MF	(England)	Bob Booker	14 (2)	2	—		—		—		14 (2)	2
MF	(England)	Paul Buckle	8 (7)	1	1 (1)	0	2 (1)	0	2 (1)	0	13 (10)	1
MF	(England)	Andy Driscoll	0 (1)	0	0	0	0	0	0	0	0 (1)	0
MF	(England)	Tony Finnigan	3	0	—		—		1	0	4	0
MF	(England)	Kevin Godfrey	26 (5)	3	2 (1)	0	5	3	2	0	35 (6)	6
MF	(England)	Keith Jones	6	1	—		3	0	—		9	1
MF	(England)	Robbie Peters	1 (8)	0	0	0	1 (2)	0	1 (1)	0	3 (11)	0
MF	(England)	Simon Ratcliffe	31 (3)	2	3	0	3	0	2 (1)	0	39 (4)	2
MF	(England)	Wilf Rostron	15 (3)	0	0	0	2 (1)	0	1	0	18 (4)	0
MF	(England)	Neil Smilie	44	7	3	0	5	0	3	0	55	7
FW	(England)	Gary Blissett	31 (6)	17	3	1	2 (2)	0	3	0	39 (8)	18
FW	(England)	Richard Cadette	10 (1)	1	—		3	4	—		13 (1)	5
FW	(Jamaica)	Marcus Gayle	28 (10)	6	1 (1)	0	3 (1)	0	2 (1)	0	34 (13)	6
FW	(England)	Dean Holdsworth	40 (1)	24	3	4	4 (1)	6	2 (1)	4	49 (3)	38
FW	(England)	Simon Line	0	0	0	0	0 (1)	0	0	0	0 (1)	0
FW	(England)	Lee Luscombe	10 (3)	3	—		—		2	1	12 (3)	4
FW	(England)	Tony Sealy	9 (9)	0	2 (1)	1	—		1	2	12 (10)	0
Players loaned in during the season
GK	(England)	Perry Suckling	8	0	—		—		1	0	9	0
MF	(Poland)	Detzi Kruszyński	8	0	—		—		—		8	0

- Players listed in italics left the club mid-season.
- Source: The Big Brentford Book Of The Nineties

=== Goalscorers ===
Pos.	Nat	Player	FL3	FAC	FLC	FLT	Total
FW	(England)	Dean Holdsworth	24	4	6	4	38
FW	(England)	Gary Blissett	17	1	0	0	18
DF	(England)	Terry Evans	8	0	1	0	9
MF	(England)	Neil Smilie	7	0	0	0	7
FW	(Jamaica)	Marcus Gayle	6	0	0	0	6
MF	(England)	Kevin Godfrey	3	0	3	0	6
FW	(England)	Richard Cadette	1	—	4	—	5
FW	(England)	Lee Luscombe	3	—	—	1	4
MF	(England)	Bob Booker	2	—	—	—	3
MF	(England)	Simon Ratcliffe	2	0	0	0	2
DF	(England)	Jamie Bates	1	1	0	0	2
MF	(England)	Keith Jones	1	—	0	—	1
MF	(England)	Paul Buckle	1	0	0	0	1
DF	(England)	Keith Millen	1	0	0	0	1
DF	(England)	Billy Manuel	0	0	1	0	1
Opponents			4	0	0	0	4
Total			81	7	15	7	110

- Players listed in italics left the club mid-season.
- Source: The Big Brentford Book Of The Nineties

=== Management ===
Name	Nat	From	To	Record All Comps					Record League				
Name	Nat	From	To	P	W	D	L	W %	P	W	D	L	W %
Phil Holder	(England)	17 August 1991	2 May 1992	57	29	9	19	50.88|	46	25	7	14	54.35

=== Summary ===
Games played	57 (46 Third Division, 3 FA Cup, 5 League Cup, 3 Football League Trophy)
Games won	29 (25 Third Division, 1 FA Cup, 2 League Cup, 1 Football League Trophy)
Games drawn	9 (7 Third Division, 1 FA Cup, 1 League Cup, 0 Football League Trophy)
Games lost	19 (14 Third Division, 1 FA Cup, 2 League Cup, 2 Football League Trophy)
Goals scored	110 (81 Third Division, 7 FA Cup, 15 League Cup, 7 Football League Trophy)
Goals conceded	85 (55 Third Division, 6 FA Cup, 15 League Cup, 9 Football League Trophy)
Clean sheets	12 (15 Third Division, 0 FA Cup, 0 League Cup, 1 Football League Trophy)
Biggest league win	4–0 on 2 occasions
Worst league defeat	3–0 versus Bury, 8 February 1992
Most appearances	54, Terry Evans (44 Third Division, 3 FA Cup, 5 League Cup, 2 Football League Trophy)
Top scorer (league)	24, Dean Holdsworth
Top scorer (all competitions)	38, Dean Holdsworth

== Transfers & loans ==
Players transferred in
Date	Pos.	Name	Previous club	Fee	Ref.
14 June 1991	DF	(England) Billy Manuel	(England) Gillingham	£60,000	
October 1991	FW	(England) Lee Luscombe	(England) Southampton	£15,000	
October 1991	FW	(England) Tony Sealy	(Finland) MYPA	Free	
November 1991	MF	(England) Bob Booker	(England) Sheffield United	Free	
17 January 1992	MF	(England) Tony Finnigan	(England) Swindon Town	Non-contract	
28 February 1992	DF	(England) Brian Statham	(England) Tottenham Hotspur	£70,000	
February 1992	DF	(Republic of Ireland) Chris Hughton	(England) West Ham United	Free	
March 1992	DF	(Republic of Ireland) Tim O'Shea	(England) Gillingham	Non-contract	
Players loaned in
Date from	Pos.	Name	From	Date to	Ref.
11 October 1991	GK	(England) Perry Suckling	(England) Crystal Palace	November 1991	
16 January 1992	DF	(England) Brian Statham	(England) Tottenham Hotspur	16 February 1992	
March 1992	MF	(Poland) Detzi Kruszyński	(England) Wimbledon	End of season	
Players transferred out
Date	Pos.	Name	Subsequent club	Fee	Ref.
1 July 1991	DF	(England) Jason Cousins	(England) Wycombe Wanderers	Free	
21 October 1991	MF	(England) Keith Jones	(England) Southend United	£175,000	
9 January 1992	FW	(England) Richard Cadette	(Scotland) Falkirk	£50,000	
Players loaned out
Date from	Pos.	Name	To	Date to	Ref.
November 1991	MF	(England) Andy Driscoll	(England) Staines Town	December 1991	
Players released
Date	Pos.	Name	Subsequent club	Join date	Ref.
30 June 1992	MF	(England) Andy Driscoll	(England) Yeading	1992	
30 June 1992	MF	(England) Tony Finnigan	(Hong Kong) Ernest Borel	1992	
30 June 1992	FW	(England) Simon Line	Retired		
30 June 1992	DF	(Republic of Ireland) Tim O'Shea	Hong Kong Rangers	1992	
30 June 1992	FW	(England) Tony Sealy	(Hong Kong) Michelotti	1992	

== Kit ==
Supplier: Chad
Sponsor(s): KLM

Home	Away

Source: Brentford F.C.

== Awards ==
- Supporters' Player of the Year: Keith Millen
- Football League Third Division PFA Team of the Year: Terry Evans, Dean Holdsworth
- Football League Third Division Manager of the Month: Phil Holder (November 1991, April 1992)
