= 1990–91 Brentford F.C. season =

English football team season

Brentford
1990–91 season
- Chairman: Martin Lange
- Manager: Phil Holder
- Stadium: Griffin Park
- Third Division: 6th
- Play-offs: Semi-final
- FA Cup: Third round
- League Cup: Second round
- Football League Trophy: Southern Area final
- Top goalscorer: League: Blissett (10); All: Blissett (15)
- Highest home attendance: 8,021
- Lowest home attendance: 4,812
- Average home league attendance: 6,144
Home colours	Away colours

During the 1990–91 English football season, Brentford competed in the Football League Third Division. Five wins in the final six matches of the season propelled the Bees from mid-table into the play-offs, where the club was defeated by Tranmere Rovers in the semi-finals.

== Season summary ==
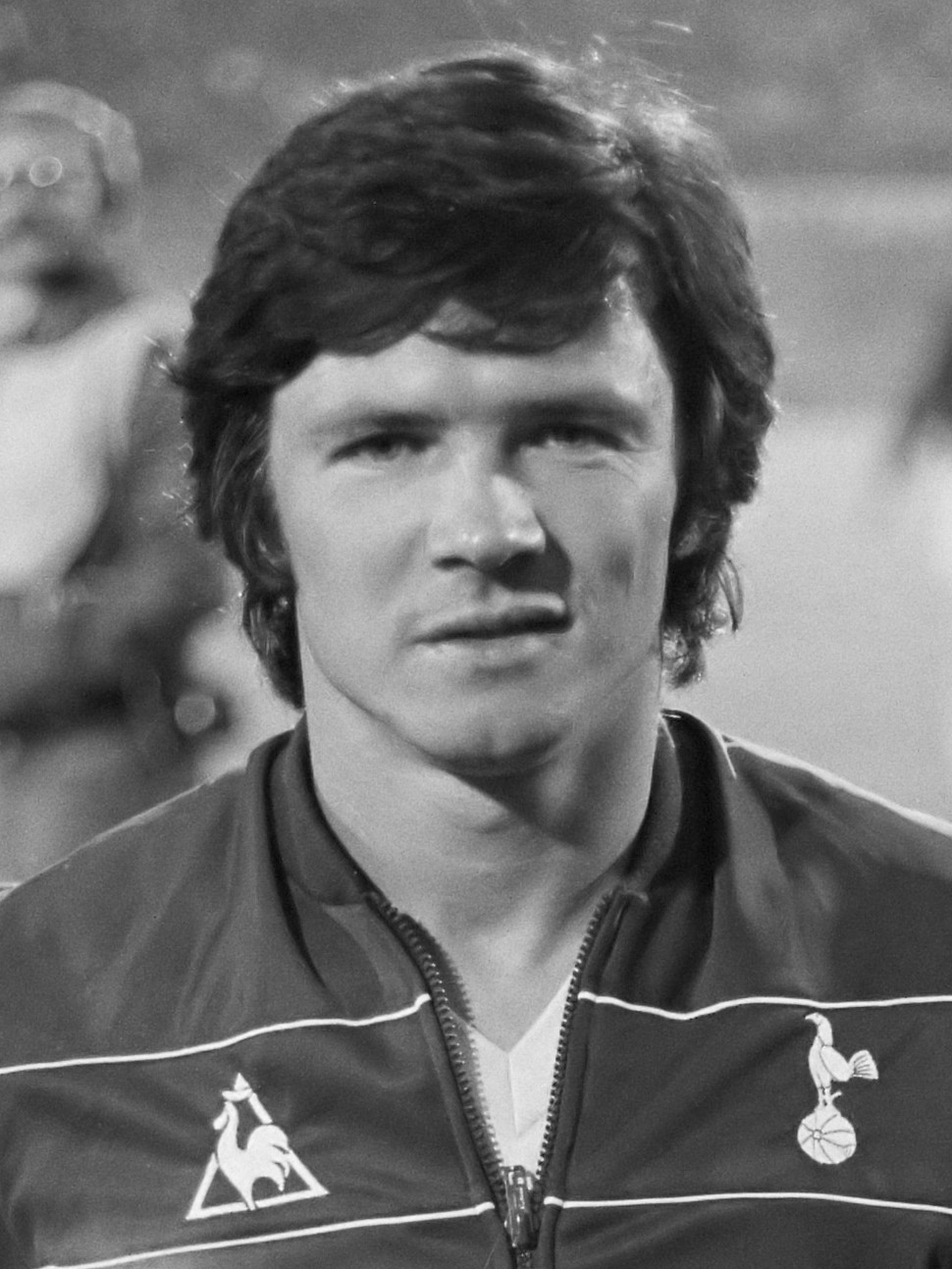
Steve Perryman resigned as manager on the eve of the season.

Third Division Brentford conducted little transfer business during the 1990 off-season, buying only Sheffield United goalkeeper Graham Benstead and selling full back Roger Stanislaus to Bury. Midfielder Eddie May was transfer-listed at his own request, while midfielders Keith Jones, Kevin Godfrey and forward Richard Cadette rejected new contracts and instead signed weekly deals. Ten days before the first match of the season, the club was rocked by the resignation of manager Steve Perryman, who had been in charge since February 1987. Perryman's assistant Phil Holder took over and began his first job in football management.

Just two defeats from the opening 12 league matches of the season had Brentford flirting with automatic promotion, before successive defeats in late October and early November dropped the club into the play-off places. Aided by the goalscoring of fit-again Gary Blissett, the Bees showed good league form through November and December and ended 1990 in the automatic promotion places. After loss to Oldham Athletic in the third round of the FA Cup, attention turned to the Football League Trophy, in which the Bees went all the way to the Southern Area finals before being defeated over two legs by league rivals Birmingham City. The run in the Trophy affected Brentford's promotion-chasing form, with the team having won just seven of 17 matches since the turn of the year. A draw and a defeat in the wake of the Trophy exit gave way to improved form for the remainder of the season, with five wins from six matches sealing a 6th-place finish and a two-legged tie with Tranmere Rovers in the play-off semi-finals. A 3–2 defeat on aggregate ended Brentford's season.

== League table ==
Pos	Team	Pld	W	D	L	GF	GA	GD	Pts	Promotion or relegation
4	Bolton Wanderers	46	24	11	11	64	50	+14	83	Qualification for the Third Division play-offs
5	Tranmere Rovers (O, P)	46	23	9	14	64	46	+18	78	Qualification for the Third Division play-offs
6	Brentford	46	21	13	12	59	47	+12	76	Qualification for the Third Division play-offs
7	Bury	46	20	13	13	67	56	+11	73	Qualification for the Third Division play-offs
8	Bradford City	46	20	10	16	62	54	+8	70	

(O) Play-off winners; (P) Promoted

== Results ==
Brentford's goal tally listed first.

=== Legend ===
Win	Draw	Loss

=== Pre-season and friendlies ===
Date	Opponent	Venue	Result	Attendance	Scorer(s)
31 July 1990	Kingstonian	A	2–2	n/a	Smillie, May
7 August 1990	Chesham United	A	1–1	n/a	Cadette
11 August 1990	Chelsea	H	0–6	4,915	
14 August 1990	Oxford United	H	1–1	5,775	Holdsworth
17 August 1990	Charlton Athletic	H	1–2	1,231	Smillie
29 October 1990	Bedfont	A	5–1	n/a	Blissett (2), Brooke (pen), Moabi, og

=== Football League Third Division ===
No.	Date	Opponent	Venue	Result	Attendance	Scorer(s)
1	25 August 1990	Bournemouth	H	0–0	5,669	
2	1 September 1990	Mansfield Town	A	2–0	2,513	Smilie, Godfrey
3	8 September 1990	Chester City	H	0–1	4,812	
4	15 September 1990	Swansea City	A	2–2	4,127	Bates, Jones (pen)
5	18 September 1990	Rotherham United	A	2–2	4,288	Holdsworth, Smilie
6	22 September 1990	Bolton Wanderers	H	4–2	5,077	May, Brooke, Jones, Holdsworth
7	29 September 1990	Grimsby Town	H	1–0	5,951	Jones
8	2 October 1990	Preston North End	A	1–1	5,025	Godfrey
9	6 October 1990	Bradford City	A	1–0	6,402	Godfrey
10	14 October 1990	Cambridge United	H	0–3	3,139	
11	20 October 1990	Huddersfield Town	H	1–0	5,509	May
12	23 October 1990	Reading	A	2–1	6,562	Gayle, Holdsworth
13	26 October 1990	Tranmere Rovers	A	1–2	8,575	Holdsworth (pen)
14	4 November 1990	Southend United	H	0–1	10,605	
15	10 November 1990	Bury	H	2–2	5,303	Blissett, Cockram
16	24 November 1990	Exeter City	A	1–1	4,764	Blissett
17	2 December 1990	Leyton Orient	A	1–0	5,359	Godfrey
18	16 December 1990	Stoke City	A	2–2	10,995	Cadette, Smilie
19	23 December 1990	Wigan Athletic	H	1–0	6,495	Blissett (pen)
20	26 December 1990	Birmingham City	A	2–0	6,669	Blissett (2)
21	29 December 1990	Crewe Alexandra	A	3–3	3,636	Blissett, Cadette, Cockram
22	1 January 1991	Shrewsbury Town	H	3–0	7,064	Blissett, Gayle, Cockram
23	12 January 1991	Mansfield Town	H	0–0	6,064	
24	19 January 1991	Bournemouth	A	0–2	4,421	
25	26 January 1991	Swansea City	H	2–0	7,102	Blissett, Jones
26	2 February 1991	Rotherham United	H	1–2	5,540	Jones
27	5 February 1991	Bolton Wanderers	A	0–1	6,731	
28	16 February 1991	Exeter City	H	1–0	5,118	Millen
29	23 February 1991	Bury	A	1–1	2,956	Cadette
30	3 March 1991	Leyton Orient	A	2–1	5,136	Cadette, Holdsworth
31	9 March 1991	Stoke City	H	0–4	7,249	
32	12 March 1991	Preston North End	H	2–0	4,856	Bates, Blissett
33	16 March 1991	Grimsby Town	A	0–2	6,685	
34	19 March 1991	Cambridge United	A	0–0	4,931	
35	23 March 1991	Bradford City	H	6–1	5,601	og, Evans, Jones, Cadette (2), Gayle
36	30 March 1991	Birmingham City	H	2–2	6,757	Ratcliffe, Blissett
37	1 April 1991	Wigan Athletic	A	0–1	2,160	
38	6 April 1991	Crewe Alexandra	H	1–0	5,066	Fleming
39	13 April 1991	Shrewsbury Town	A	1–1	2,841	Ratcliffe
40	16 April 1991	Fulham	H	1–2	7,839	Rostron
41	20 April 1991	Huddersfield Town	A	2–1	6,489	Jones, Peters
42	23 April 1991	Fulham	A	1–0	6,765	Rostron
43	27 April 1991	Reading	H	1–0	6,398	Millen
44	30 April 1991	Chester City	A	2–1	1,275	Gayle, Holdsworth
45	4 May 1991	Tranmere Rovers	H	0–2	7,341	
46	11 May 1991	Southend United	A	1–0	9,666	Gayle

=== Football League Third Division play-offs ===
Round	Date	Opponent	Venue	Result	Attendance	Scorer(s)
SF (1st leg)	19 May 1991	Tranmere Rovers	H	2–2	9,330	Evans, Godfrey
SF (2nd leg)	22 May 1991	Tranmere Rovers	A	0–1 (lost 3–2 on aggregate)	11,438	

=== FA Cup ===
Round	Date	Opponent	Venue	Result	Attendance	Scorer(s)
R1	17 November 1990	Yeovil Town	H	5–0	5,830	Blissett, Holdsworth (2), May, Jones
R2	12 December 1990	Birmingham City	A	3–1	5,072	Blissett, Millen, Jones
R3	5 January 1991	Oldham Athletic	A	1–3	6,538	Holdsworth

=== Football League Cup ===
Round	Date	Opponent	Venue	Result	Attendance	Scorer(s)
R1 (1st leg)	28 August 1990	Hereford United	H	2–0	5,583	Bates, Godfrey
R1 (2nd leg)	5 September 1990	Hereford United	A	0–1 (won 2–1 on aggregate)	4,927	
R2 (1st leg)	26 September 1990	Sheffield Wednesday	A	1–2	4,502	Evans
R2 (2nd leg)	9 October 1990	Sheffield Wednesday	H	1–2 (lost 4–2 on aggregate)	7,394	Jones (pen)

=== Football League Trophy ===
Round	Date	Opponent	Venue	Result	Attendance	Scorer(s)
SPR	27 November 1990	Fulham	A	1–1	2,761	Blissett
SPR	29 January 1991	Leyton Orient	H	2–0	1,348	Blissett (2)
SR1	21 February 1991	Wrexham	H	0–0 (a.e.t.), won 3–0 on pens)	2,247	
SQF	28 February 1991	Hereford United	A	2–0	2,207	Smilie, Holdsworth
SSF	5 March 1991	Southend United	A	3–0	3,937	Smilie, Jones, Cadette
SAF (1st leg)	26 March 1991	Birmingham City	A	1–2	16,219	Gayle
SAF (2nd leg)	9 April 1991	Birmingham City	H	0–1 (lost 3–1 on aggregate)	8,745	

- Source: Statto, 11v11, The Big Brentford Book Of The Nineties

== Playing squad ==
Players' ages are as of the opening day of the 1990–91 season.

Pos.	Name	Nat.	Date of birth (age)	Signed from	Signed in	Notes
Goalkeepers
GK	Graham Benstead	(England)	20 August 1963 (aged 27)	Sheffield United	1990	
Defenders
DF	Jamie Bates	(England)	24 February 1968 (aged 22)	Youth	1986	
DF	Jason Cousins	(England)	4 October 1970 (aged 19)	Youth	1989	
DF	Terry Evans (c)	(England)	12 April 1965 (aged 25)	Hillingdon	1985	
DF	Mark Fleming	(England)	11 August 1969 (aged 21)	Queens Park Rangers	1989	
DF	Clive Goodyear	(England)	15 January 1961 (aged 29)	Wimbledon	1990	
DF	Keith Millen	(England)	26 September 1966 (aged 23)	Youth	1985	
Midfielders
MF	Paul Buckle	(England)	16 December 1970 (aged 19)	Youth	1988	
MF	Allan Cockram	(England)	8 October 1963 (aged 26)	St Albans City	1988	
MF	Kevin Godfrey	(England)	24 February 1960 (aged 30)	Leyton Orient	1988	
MF	Keith Jones	(England)	14 October 1965 (aged 24)	Chelsea	1987	
MF	Robbie Peters	(England)	18 May 1971 (aged 19)	Youth	1989	Loaned to St Albans City
MF	Simon Ratcliffe	(England)	8 February 1967 (aged 23)	Norwich City	1989	
MF	Wilf Rostron	(England)	29 September 1956 (aged 33)	Sheffield United	1991	Assistant manager
MF	Neil Smilie	(England)	19 July 1958 (aged 32)	Reading	1988	
Forwards
FW	Gary Blissett	(England)	29 June 1964 (aged 26)	Crewe Alexandra	1987	
FW	Richard Cadette	(England)	21 March 1965 (aged 25)	Sheffield United	1988	
FW	Marcus Gayle	(Jamaica)	27 September 1970 (aged 19)	Youth	1988	Loaned to KuPS
FW	Dean Holdsworth	(England)	8 November 1968 (aged 21)	Watford	1989	
Players who left the club mid-season
GK	Tony Parks	(England)	26 January 1963 (aged 27)	Tottenham Hotspur	1988	Loaned to Queens Park Rangers and Fulham, transferred to Fulham
DF	Jim Carstairs	(Scotland)	29 January 1971 (aged 19)	Arsenal	1991	Returned to Arsenal after loan
DF	Stuart Cash	(England)	5 September 1965 (aged 24)	Nottingham Forest	1990	Returned to Nottingham Forest after loan
MF	Garry Brooke	(England)	24 November 1960 (aged 29)	Wimbledon	1990	Released
MF	Eddie May	(Scotland)	30 August 1967 (aged 22)	Hibernian	1989	Transferred to Falkirk

- Source: The Big Brentford Book Of The Nineties

== Coaching staff ==
Name	Role
(England) Phil Holder	Manager
(England) Wilf Rostron	Assistant Manager
(England) Graham Pearce	First Team Coach
(England) Roy Clare	Physiotherapist

== Statistics ==
=== Appearances and goals ===
Substitute appearances in brackets.

Pos	Nat	Name	League		FA Cup		League Cup		FL Trophy		Play-offs		Total	
Pos	Nat	Name	Apps	Goals	Apps	Goals	Apps	Goals	Apps	Goals	Apps	Goals	Apps	Goals
GK	(England)	Graham Benstead	45	0	3	0	4	0	7	0	2	0	61	0
GK	(England)	Tony Parks	1	0	0	0	—		0	0	—		1	0
DF	(England)	Jamie Bates	30 (2)	2	0	0	4	1	4	0	2	0	40 (2)	3
DF	(England)	Jason Cousins	8	0	0	0	3	0	1 (1)	0	0	0	12 (1)	0
DF	(England)	Terry Evans	36	2	3	0	1 (1)	1	6	0	2	1	48 (1)	4
DF	(England)	Mark Fleming	18	1	3	0	2	0	4	0	0	0	27	1
DF	(England)	Clive Goodyear	10	0	—		—		1	0	0	0	11	0
DF	(England)	Keith Millen	31 (1)	2	3	1	4	0	3	0	2	0	41 (1)	3
MF	(England)	Garry Brooke	8 (3)	1	0 (1)	0	2	0	—		—		10 (4)	1
MF	(England)	Paul Buckle	24 (2)	0	2	0	2	0	4 (1)	0	0	0	32 (3)	0
MF	(England)	Allan Cockram	7 (13)	3	1 (2)	0	0	0	4 (2)	0	0	0	12 (17)	3
MF	(England)	Kevin Godfrey	26 (6)	4	2 (1)	0	4	1	3 (2)	0	1 (1)	1	36 (10)	6
MF	(England)	Keith Jones	45	6	3	2	4	1	6	1	2	0	60	10
MF	(Scotland)	Eddie May	16 (1)	2	1	1	4	0	1	0	—		22 (1)	3
MF	(England)	Robbie Peters	6	1	—		0	0	—		0 (1)	0	6 (1)	1
MF	(England)	Simon Ratcliffe	34 (4)	2	3	0	0 (2)	0	6	0	2	0	45 (6)	2
MF	(England)	Wilf Rostron	18 (4)	2	—		—		2 (2)	0	2	0	22 (6)	2
MF	(England)	Neil Smilie	33 (3)	3	1	0	4	0	5	2	2	0	45 (3)	5
FW	(England)	Gary Blissett	22 (4)	10	3	2	0 (1)	0	3 (1)	3	2	0	30 (6)	15
FW	(England)	Richard Cadette	19 (9)	6	1	0	2 (2)	0	6	1	0	0	28 (11)	7
FW	(Jamaica)	Marcus Gayle	23 (10)	6	2 (1)	0	—		4 (2)	1	1 (1)	0	30 (14)	7
FW	(England)	Dean Holdsworth	27 (3)	5	2	3	2	0	4 (1)	1	2	0	37 (4)	9
Players loaned in during the season
DF	(Scotland)	Jim Carstairs	8	0	—		—		3	0	—		11	0
DF	(England)	Stuart Cash	11	0	—		2	0	0 (1)	0	—		13 (1)	0

- Players listed in italics left the club mid-season.
- Source: The Big Brentford Book Of The Nineties

=== Goalscorers ===
Pos.	Nat	Player	FL3	FAC	FLC	FLT	FLP	Total
FW	(England)	Gary Blissett	10	2	0	3	0	15
MF	(England)	Keith Jones	6	2	1	1	0	10
FW	(England)	Dean Holdsworth	5	3	0	1	0	9
FW	(Jamaica)	Marcus Gayle	6	0	—	1	0	7
FW	(England)	Richard Cadette	6	0	0	1	0	7
MF	(England)	Kevin Godfrey	4	0	1	0	1	5
MF	(England)	Neil Smilie	3	0	0	2	0	5
DF	(England)	Terry Evans	2	0	1	0	1	4
MF	(England)	Allan Cockram	3	0	0	0	0	3
MF	(Scotland)	Eddie May	2	1	0	0	—	3
DF	(England)	Jamie Bates	2	0	1	0	0	3
DF	(England)	Keith Millen	2	1	0	0	0	3
MF	(England)	Wilf Rostron	2	—	—	0	0	2
MF	(England)	Simon Ratcliffe	2	0	0	0	0	2
MF	(England)	Garry Brooke	1	0	0	—	—	1
MF	(England)	Robbie Peters	1	—	0	—	0	1
DF	(England)	Mark Fleming	1	0	0	0	0	1
Opponents			1	0	0	0	0	1
Total			59	9	4	9	2	83

- Players listed in italics left the club mid-season.
- Source: The Big Brentford Book Of The Nineties

=== Management ===
Name	Nat	From	To	Record All Comps					Record League				
Name	Nat	From	To	P	W	D	L	W %	P	W	D	L	W %
Phil Holder	(England)	25 August 1990	22 May 1991	62	27	16	19	43.55|	46	21	13	12	45.65

=== Summary ===
Games played	62 (46 Third Division, 3 FA Cup, 4 League Cup, 7 Football League Trophy, 2 Football League play-offs)
Games won	27 (21 Third Division, 2 FA Cup, 1 League Cup, 3 Football League Trophy, 0 Football League play-offs)
Games drawn	16 (13 Third Division, 0 FA Cup, 0 League Cup, 2 Football League Trophy, 1 Football League play-offs)
Games lost	19 (12 Third Division, 1 FA Cup, 3 League Cup, 2 Football League Trophy, 1 Football League play-offs)
Goals scored	83 (59 Third Division, 9 FA Cup, 4 League Cup, 9 Football League Trophy, 2 Football League play-offs)
Goals conceded	63 (47 Third Division, 4 FA Cup, 5 League Cup, 4 Football League Trophy, 3 Football League play-offs)
Clean sheets	24 (18 Third Division, 1 FA Cup, 1 League Cup, 4 Football League Trophy, 0 Football League play-offs)
Biggest league win	6–1 versus Bradford City, 23 March 1991
Worst league defeat	4–0 versus Stoke City, 9 March 1991
Most appearances	61, Graham Benstead (45 Third Division, 3 FA Cup, 4 League Cup, 7 Football League Trophy, 2 Football League play-offs)
Top scorer (league)	10, Gary Blissett
Top scorer (all competitions)	15, Gary Blissett

== Transfers & loans ==
Players transferred in
Date	Pos.	Name	Previous club	Fee	Ref.
July 1990	GK	(England) Graham Benstead	(England) Sheffield United	£70,000	
August 1990	MF	(England) Garry Brooke	(England) Wimbledon	Free	
January 1991	MF	(England) Wilf Rostron	(England) Sheffield United	Free	
March 1991	DF	(England) Clive Goodyear	(England) Wimbledon	Free	
April 1991	GK	(England) Laurence Batty	(England) Fulham	Free	
Players loaned in
Date from	Pos.	Name	From	Date to	Ref.
September 1990	DF	(England) Stuart Cash	(England) Nottingham Forest	December 1990	
February 1991	DF	(Scotland) Jim Carstairs	(England) Arsenal	April 1991	
February 1991	GK	(England) Laurence Batty	(England) Fulham	April 1991	
Players transferred out
Date	Pos.	Name	Subsequent club	Fee	Ref.
30 July 1990	DF	(England) Roger Stanislaus	(England) Bury	£90,000	
15 March 1991	MF	(Scotland) Eddie May	(Scotland) Falkirk	£75,000	
April 1991	GK	(England) Tony Parks	(England) Fulham	Free	
Players loaned out
Date from	Pos.	Name	To	Date to	Ref.
March 1990	FW	(Jamaica) Marcus Gayle	(Finland) KuPS	October 1990	
August 1990	GK	(England) Tony Parks	(England) Queens Park Rangers	September 1990	
13 September 1990	DF	(Malta) John Buttigieg	(England) Swindon Town	12 October 1990	
November 1990	MF	(England) Khotso Moabi	(England) St Albans City	January 1991	
November 1990	DF	(England) Fergus Moore	(England) Yeading	December 1990	
November 1990	MF	(England) Robbie Peters	(England) St Albans City	April 1991	
February 1991	GK	(England) Tony Parks	(England) Fulham	April 1991	
Players released
Date	Pos.	Name	Subsequent club	Join date	Ref.
December 1990	MF	(England) Garry Brooke	(England) Baldock Town	1990	
January 1991	MF	(England) Khotso Moabi	(England) St Albans City	January 1991	
February 1991	DF	(England) Fergus Moore	(England) Staines Town	n/a	
30 June 1991	GK	(England) Laurence Batty	(England) Woking	1991	
30 June 1991	DF	(Malta) John Buttigieg	(Malta) Floriana	1991	
30 June 1991	MF	(England) Allan Cockram	(England) Woking	1991	
30 June 1991	DF	(England) Clive Goodyear	(Hong Kong) Ernest Borel	1991	

== Kit ==
Supplier: Chad
Sponsor(s): KLM

Home	Away

Source: Brentford F.C.

== Awards ==
- Supporters' Player of the Year: Graham Benstead
- Players' Player of the Year: Graham Benstead
- Football League Third Division PFA Team of the Year: Keith Jones
- Football League Third Division Manager of the Month: Phil Holder (December 1990)
