= Terry Evans (footballer, born 1965) =

English footballer

Personal information
- Full name: Terence William Evans
- Date of birth: 12 April 1965 (age 61)
- Place of birth: Hammersmith, England
- Height: 6 ft 5 in (1.96 m)
- Position: Central defender

Senior career*
Years	Team	Apps	(Gls)
- Hillingdon
	Queens Park Rangers	0	(0)
–1985	Hillingdon		
1985–1993	Brentford	229	(23)
1993	→ Wycombe Wanderers (loan)		
1993–1997	Wycombe Wanderers	136	(16)
1997–1998	Kingstonian	38	(3)

Managerial career
- 1999: Wycombe Wanderers (caretaker)
- * Club domestic league appearances and goals

Terence William Evans (born 12 April 1965) is an English former professional footballer who played as a central defender and made over 530 career appearances. He spent the majority of his career in the Football League with Brentford and Wycombe Wanderers and captained both clubs. He is a member of the Brentford Hall of Fame. After his retirement from football, Evans served as caretaker manager, assistant manager and physiotherapist at Wycombe Wanderers. After leaving football, he worked in physiotherapist roles at a number of rugby union clubs.

== Career ==
=== Early years ===
Born in Hammersmith, Evans began his career with Southern League Southern Division club Hillingdon, a period bisected by a spell on non-contract terms with Queens Park Rangers. He made his debut for Hillingdon at age 16.

=== Brentford ===
Evans moved into the Football League in July 1985, when he joined Third Division club Brentford for a £5,000 fee. Evans had an uneven beginning to his career at Griffin Park, suffering an injury in a friendly match in February 1986 and making two aborted comebacks, before returning to the club on a regular basis in October 1987 and making 32 appearances during the 1987–88 season. He forged a centre back partnership with Keith Millen and eventually became captain of the club.

Evans made a career-high 62 appearances during the 1988–89 season, a successful campaign in which he missed just one league game and appeared in all 8 matches of Brentford's run to the sixth round of the FA Cup. He was voted the club's Supporters' and Players' Player of the Year for the 1988–89 season and also won both accolades for 1989–90.

Evans' greatest season with Brentford came in 1991–92, when he captained the club to the Third Division title and promotion to the second tier for the first time since 1954. He was also named in the PFA Team of the Year. Evans had a season to forget in the new First Division, succumbing to injury on the opening day against Wolverhampton Wanderers and only regaining fitness for the final 10 games of the season, ending the campaign with relegation straight back to the third tier.

Early in the 1993–94 season, new manager David Webb preferred Jamie Bates and Shane Westley to Evans and Millen as his centre back pairing and Evans chose to depart the club. He made 285 appearances and scored 30 goals during his eight years at Griffin Park. A cult hero, Evans was named as Brentford's all-time fans' favourite, second greatest player and best-ever captain in a Football League 125th anniversary poll in 2013 and he also topped a BBC Sport Brentford fans' cult hero poll in 2005. He was inducted into the Brentford Hall of Fame in August 2014.

=== Wycombe Wanderers ===
In August 1993, Evans joined Third Division club Wycombe Wanderers on a six-week loan. He had a difficult debut in a 4–3 victory away to Hereford United on 31 August 1993 and after regaining fitness, his performances led manager Martin O'Neil to sign him on a permanent contract for a £40,000 fee two months later. An injury suffered in a Football League Trophy Southern Area semi-final shootout win over Fulham on 8 February 1994 ruled Evans out for the remainder of the 1993–94 season, though his form prior to the injury was such that he was named in the PFA Team of the Year.

After Wycombe's promotion to the Second Division via the playoffs, Evans returned as captain for the 1994–95 season. He missed just two league games as the Chairboys finished in sixth position, just missing out on a second successive playoff campaign. Evans played on until the end of the 1996–97 season, when he was released by manager John Gregory. Evans made 157 appearances and scored 19 goals during his four seasons at Adams Park.

=== Kingstonian ===
Evans dropped into non-League football during the 1997 off-season and joined Isthmian League Premier Division club Kingstonian. His single season at Kingsmeadow Stadium was a successful one, making 51 appearances, scoring three goals and captaining the club to promotion to the Conference as champions.

== Physiotherapy career ==
Evans returned to Wycombe Wanderers in 1998 as the youth team's physiotherapist. Evans stated that his desire to become a physiotherapist was driven by Wycombe's Sports Therapist Dave Jones, who oversaw Evans' management of problems with his right knee, having suffered from a chondral defect and undergone two anterior cruciate ligament reconstructions and a medial cruciate ligament repair during the last three years of his playing career. Evans departed Wycombe Wanderers in March 2004, but returned in 2006 to take up the role of Senior Strength & Conditioning coach. He left to take up a similar role at rugby union club Wasps in 2008 and progressed to become the club's Senior Strength & Conditioning Rehabilitation Specialist and a physiotherapist. He later served in physiotherapy roles at London Welsh and Ealing Trailfinders.

== Management and coaching career ==
While working as Wycombe's youth team physiotherapist, the sacking of first team manager Neil Smillie on 11 January 1999 saw Evans take over the position as caretaker. With morale rock-bottom, Evans took temporary charge for two difficult games against Millwall and Chesterfield that both ended in defeat. He was, however, retained as part of the management team as a coach when Lawrie Sanchez was appointed manager on 5 February 1999.

== Personal life ==
Evans played rugby union as a schoolboy and remarked in 2010 that he may have entered the game had it been professional in England at the time. Evans' son Harry is a taekwondo fighter and won gold medals in the U16 categories in the 2014 ITF World Championship and the 2015 ITF European Championship. Evans worked as a printer while with Hillingdon early in his playing career and after his retirement from football, he worked as a personal trainer and ran a gym in between his two backroom roles with Wycombe Wanderers.

== Career statistics ==
Appearances and goals by club, season and competition
Club	Season	League			FA Cup		League Cup		Other		Total	
Club	Season	Division	Apps	Goals	Apps	Goals	Apps	Goals	Apps	Goals	Apps	Goals
Brentford	1985–86	Third Division	19	1	1	1	1	0	2 (Note: Appearances in Football League Trophy)	0	23	2
Brentford	1986–87	Third Division	1	0	0	0	0	0	1	0	2	0
Brentford	1987–88	Third Division	29	4	1	0	0	0	2	0	32	4
Brentford	1988–89	Third Division	45	5	8	1	4	0	5	0	62	6
Brentford	1989–90	Third Division	44	4	1	0	4	1	3	0	52	5
Brentford	1990–91	Third Division	36	2	3	0	2	1	8 (Note: 6 appearances in Football League Trophy, 2 appearances in Third Division play-offs)	1	49	4
Brentford	1991–92	Third Division	44	8	3	0	5	1	2	0	54	9
Brentford	1992–93	First Division	11	0	0	0	0	0	—		11	0
Brentford	Total		229	23	17	2	16	4	23	1	285	30
Wycombe Wanderers	1996–97	Second Division	42	2	1	0	4	1	0	0	47	3
Wycombe Wanderers	Total		136	16	7	0	8	2	4	1	155	19
Kingstonian	1997–98	Isthmian League Premier Division	39	3	4	0	—		8 (Note: 5 appearances in Surrey Senior Cup, 1 appearance in FA Trophy, 1 appearance in Isthmian League Cup, 1 appearance in Isthmian League Full Members Cup)	0	51	3
Career total			404	44	29	2	28	7	35	2	538	55

== Honours ==
Brentford

- Football League Third Division: 1991–92

Wycombe Wanderers

- Football League Third Division play-offs: 1994

Kingstonian

- Isthmian League Premier Division: 1997–98

Individual

- Brentford Supporters' Player of the Year: 1988–89, 1989–90
- Brentford Players' Player of the Year: 1988–89, 1989–90
- Brentford Hall of Fame
- Football League Third Division PFA Team of the Year: 1991–92, (Note: Third tier) 1993–94 (Note: Fourth tier)
