= Richard Cadette =

English footballer (born 1965)

Personal information
- Full name: Richard Raymond Cadette
- Date of birth: 21 March 1965 (age 61)
- Place of birth: Hammersmith, England
- Height: 1.70 m (5 ft 7 in)
- Position: Forward

Youth career
- –1984: Wembley

Senior career*
Years	Team	Apps	(Gls)
1984–1985	Orient	21	(4)
1985–1987	Southend United	90	(49)
1987–1988	Sheffield United	28	(7)
1988–1992	Brentford	87	(20)
1989–1990	→ Bournemouth (loan)	8	(1)
1992–1994	Falkirk	92	(31)
1994	→ Millwall (loan)	0	(0)
1994–1997	Millwall	24	(5)
1997	Shelbourne	1	(0)
1997	Clydebank	4	(1)
1997–1998	Gloucester City	2	(0)
Total		355	(119)

Managerial career
- 2002–2006: Tooting & Mitcham United
- * Club domestic league appearances and goals

Richard Raymond Cadette (born 21 March 1965) is an English former professional footballer who played as a forward, most notably for Falkirk, Brentford and Southend United. After his retirement he moved into management with Tooting & Mitcham United.

== Playing career ==
=== Early years ===
Born in Hammersmith, Cadette began his career in non-League football with Isthmian League First Division club Wembley, before securing a move to the Football League with Third Division club Orient in August 1984. He made 27 appearances and scored six goals in a disastrous 1984–85 season for the Os, which saw the club relegated to the Fourth Division. He departed Brisbane Road after the season.

=== Southend United ===
Cadette signed for Fourth Division club Southend United in a £4,000 deal in August 1985. He had an emphatic start to his career at Roots Hall, scoring four goals in a 5–1 rout of former club Orient on his full league debut for the club. He scored 56 goals in 104 appearances over the course of two seasons and celebrated promotion to the Third Division with a third-place finish at the end of the 1986–87 season. Cadette twice named in the PFA Fourth Division Team of the Year while with the Shrimpers and was also voted the club's 1985–86 Player of the Year. He left the club after the season.

=== Sheffield United ===
Cadette moved up to Second Division to sign for Sheffield United in July 1987, in a move which was settled by tribunal for £90,000. He failed to replicate his previous goalscoring form, netting just seven times in 33 appearances, before departing at the end of the 1987–88 season.

=== Brentford ===
Cadette moved back to London to sign for Third Division club Brentford in July 1988 for an £80,000 fee. Brought in by manager Steve Perryman to form a strike partnership with Gary Blissett, Cadette hit the ground running, top scoring with 17 goals in the 1988–89 season, before having his season cut short by injury in March 1989. He featured in Brentford's run to the quarter-finals of the FA Cup, which ended in a 4–0 defeat to giants Liverpool, with Cadette hitting the post with a chance which could have put the Bees 1–0 up.

The arrival of Dean Holdsworth up front for the 1989–90 season and the change to route one tactics pushed Cadette out of contention. Out of favour at, Cadette joined Second Division strugglers Bournemouth on loan until the end of the 1989–90 season in March 1990. He scored one goal in 8 appearances. Cadette rejected a move to a Dutch Eerste Divisie club during the 1990 off-season and stayed at Griffin Park on a weekly contract. He scored seven goals from 39 appearances in the 1990–91 season, which was ended after he underwent knee surgery in April 1991.

Cadette was offered a new contract in the 1991 off-season, but again turned it down to remain on a weekly arrangement. He began the 1991–92 season up front alongside Holdsworth, but fell behind Blissett in the pecking order in October 1991 and departed Griffin Park in January 1992. Cadette made 123 appearances and scored 31 goals in 3 1/2 years with Brentford. Looking back in 2005, Cadette revealed that despite his differences with manager Phil Holder (who had been promoted from Steve Perryman's assistant in 1990), he appreciated the support he received from the fans.

=== Falkirk ===
Cadette joined Scottish League Premier Division club Falkirk for a £50,000 fee in January 1992, linking up with former Brentford teammates Tony Parks and Eddie May. He quickly became a fan favorite at the Bairns, due to his goalscoring form. Cadette had a successful two and a half years with the club, winning the 1993–94 Scottish Challenge Cup (scoring in the final after being famously attacked by manager Jim Jefferies at half time) and the First Division title, which secured an immediate return to the top-flight. He departed Brockville Park in October 1994, after a spell which Jim Jefferies described as "phenomenal".

=== Millwall ===
Cadette returned to England to sign for First Division club Millwall on loan in October 1994. He signed a permanent £130,000 deal the following month. In what turned out to be a disastrous move, Cadette made just 27 appearances and scored 6 goals in almost three years at The New Den.

=== Shelbourne ===
After a trial with Clydebank, Cadette signed for League of Ireland club Shelbourne on a short-term contract in August 1997, as cover for the injured Stephen Geoghegan and Pat Morley.

=== Clydebank ===
Cadette rejoined Scottish League Second Division club Clydebank in late August 1997. He scored on his debut for the club, in a 2-2 draw against Clyde. However, Cadette scored one goal in seven appearances before departing the following month.

=== Gloucester City ===
Cadette dropped into non-League football to join Southern League Premier Division club Gloucester City in October 1997, for whom he made just three appearances.

== Coaching career ==
After retiring as a player, Cadette became involved with the youth setup at former club Millwall. He later managed Isthmian League First Division club Tooting & Mitcham between November 2002 and May 2006. He was sacked at the end of the 2005–06 season, after defeat to Tonbridge Angels in the playoff semi-finals.

== Personal life ==
During his playing career, Cadette suffered racism and was part of the Commission for Racial Equality and the Scottish Professional Footballers' Association.

== Career statistics ==
Appearances and goals by club, season and competition
Club	Season	League			National Cup		League Cup		Other		Total	
Club	Season	Division	Apps	Goals	Apps	Goals	Apps	Goals	Apps	Goals	Apps	Goals
Orient	1984–85	Third Division	21	4	1	1	4	0	2 (Note: Appearances in Football League Trophy)	0	28	5
Sheffield United	1987–88	Second Division	28	7	2	0	1	0	2 (Note: Appearances in Full Members Cup)	0	33	7
Brentford	1988–89	Third Division	32	12	8	1	4	2	5	2	49	17
Brentford	1989–90	Third Division	16	1	0	0	2	0	3	1	21	2
Brentford	1990–91	Third Division	28	6	1	0	4	0	6	1	39	7
Brentford	1991–92	Third Division	11	1	—		3	4	—		14	5
Brentford	Total		87	20	9	1	13	6	14	4	123	31
Bournemouth (loan)	1989–90	Second Division	8	1	—		—		—		8	1
Millwall	1994–95	First Division	16	4	1	0	2	1	—		19	5
Millwall	1995–96	Second Division	1	0	0	0	0	0	—		1	0
Millwall	1996–97	Second Division	7	1	0	0	0	0	0	0	7	1
Millwall	Total		24	5	1	0	2	1	0	0	27	6
Clydebank	1997–98	Scottish Second Division	4	1	—		—		2 (Note: Appearances in Scottish Challenge Cup)	0	6	1
Gloucester City	1997–98	Southern League Premier Division	2	0	1	0	—		—		3	0
Career total			150	33	13	2	18	6	20	4	201	45

== Honours ==
Southend United

- Football League Fourth Division third-place promotion: 1986–87

Brentford

- Football League Third Division: 1991–92

Falkirk

- Scottish League First Division: 1993–94
- Scottish Challenge Cup: 1993–94

Individual

- Southend United Player of the Year: 1985–86
- PFA Fourth Division Team of the Year: 1985–86, 1986–87
