= Kevin Godfrey (footballer) =

English footballer (born 1960)

Personal information
- Full name: Kevin Godfrey
- Date of birth: 24 February 1960 (age 66)
- Place of birth: Kennington, England
- Height: 5 ft 10 in (1.78 m)
- Positions: Winger; forward; central midfielder

Youth career
- 1976–1977: Leyton Orient

Senior career*
Years	Team	Apps	(Gls)
1977–1988	Leyton Orient	285	(62)
1986	→ Plymouth Argyle (loan)	7	(1)
1988–1993	Brentford	140	(17)
1993–1994	Yeading		
- * Club domestic league appearances and goals

Kevin Godfrey (born 24 February 1960) is an English retired football winger who made over 540 career appearances, most notably in the Football League for Leyton Orient and Brentford.

== Playing career ==
=== Leyton Orient ===
A winger, Godfrey came through the youth ranks at Second Division club Leyton Orient (then named "Orient") and signed a professional contract in March 1977. He made his debut during the 1977–78 season and finished the campaign with 16 appearances. Godfrey had to wait until the 1981–82 season to make a breakthrough and he made 50 appearances and scored seven goals during a disastrous season, which saw the Os relegated to the Third Division.

Godfrey found his best form between 1983 and 1985, averaging over 40 appearances over the course of each three seasons and scoring 10 or more goals in each. Now playing in the Fourth Division after another relegation, Godfrey fell out of favour during the 1985–86 season and made just 16 appearances before joining Third Division high-flyers Plymouth Argyle on loan in March 1986. Plymouth won six and drew one of the seven matches in which Godfrey appeared. He scored once during the loan spell, a late winner against Bristol Rovers.

Godfrey regained his Orient starting place in 1986–87 and made another 70 appearances before departing at the end of the 1987–88 season.

=== Brentford ===
Godfrey joined Third Division club Brentford during the 1988 off-season, initially to get fit, but he became a regular member in the team after forwards Gary Blissett, Richard Cadette and Neil Smillie suffered injuries. He again deputised for Blissett in the early part of the 1989–90 season, before moving back to the wing to cover for the injured Eddie May. Godfrey's best season with Brentford came in 1990–91, when he made 46 appearances and scored six goals, including one against Tranmere Rovers in the Bees' unsuccessful 1991 Third Division play-off campaign.

He won the first silverware of his career in Brentford's historic 1991–92 season, in which they won the Third Division title. Godfrey made many of his 31 appearances as a central midfielder, excelling. Aged 32 and playing in the second-tier for the first time since 1982, Godfrey made 21 appearances during the 1992–93 season and scored a last-minute goal versus Swindon Town in the preliminary round of the Anglo-Italian Cup. With the Bees relegated back to the third-tier at the first time of asking, Godfrey was released during the 1993 off-season. He made 190 appearances and scored 25 goals during his five years at Griffin Park.

=== Yeading ===
Godfrey ended his career with a spell at Isthmian League Premier Division club Yeading during the 1993–94 season.

== Personal life ==
After retiring from football, Godfrey became a taxi driver in West London and later worked for security delivery company.

== Career statistics ==
Appearances and goals by club, season and competition
Club	Season	League			FA Cup		League Cup		Other		Total	
Club	Season	Division	Apps	Goals	Apps	Goals	Apps	Goals	Apps	Goals	Apps	Goals
Plymouth Argyle (loan)	1985–86	Third Division	7	1	—		—		—		7	1
Brentford	1988–89	Third Division	29	8	7	0	0	0	5 (Note: Appearances in Football League Trophy)	1	41	9
Brentford	1989–90	Third Division	27	2	1	0	2	1	3	0	33	3
Brentford	1990–91	Third Division	32	4	3	0	4	1	5 (Note: 5 appearances in Football League Trophy, 2 appearances and 1 goal in Third Division play-offs)	0	46	6
Brentford	1991–92	Third Division	31	3	3	0	5	3	2	0	41	6
Brentford	1992–93	First Division	21	0	0	0	3	0	7 (Note: Appearances in Anglo-Italian Cup)	2	31	2
Brentford	Total		140	17	14	0	14	5	22	3	190	25
Career total			147	18	14	0	14	5	22	3	197	26

== Honours ==
Brentford

- Football League Third Division: 1991–92
