= Kevin Godfrey =

Kevin Godfrey may refer to:

- Kevin Godfrey (footballer) (born 1960), English football winger
- Epic Soundtracks (1959–1997), British musician
