= Jamie Bates (footballer) =

English footballer (born 1968)

Personal information
- Full name: James Alan Bates
- Date of birth: 24 February 1968 (age 58)
- Place of birth: Croydon, England
- Height: 6 ft 1 in (1.85 m)
- Position: Defender

Youth career
- Orient
- Southampton
- –1985: Crystal Palace
- 1985–1986: Brentford

Senior career*
Years	Team	Apps	(Gls)
1986–1999	Brentford	419	(18)
1987	→ Wycombe Wanderers (loan)	1	(0)
1999–2001	Wycombe Wanderers	80	(4)
Total		500	(22)
- * Club domestic league appearances and goals

James Alan Bates (born 24 February 1968) is an English former professional footballer who made over 520 appearances for Brentford as a central defender. In a Football League 125th anniversary poll, Bates was named as the Brentford supporters' third all-time favourite player. He also played league football for Wycombe Wanderers.

== Career ==
=== Brentford ===
==== 1986–1994 ====
After spells as a schoolboy with Southampton, Orient and Crystal Palace, Bates joined Third Division club Brentford as a trainee in 1985. After later signing non-contract terms, he made his senior debut in October 1986. Owing to the fitness and form of Keith Millen and Terry Evans, Bates was unable to play his preferred centre back position, instead playing for long periods at full back. Brentford became a threat in the Third Division in the late 1980s and early 1990s and Bates was part of the team which reached the FA Cup quarter-finals in the 1988–89 season (Bates appeared as late substitute for Andy Feeley as the Bees were beaten 4–0 by Liverpool at Anfield) and went out in the 1991 play-off semi-finals to Tranmere Rovers.

Bates made 42 league appearances in a triumphant 1991–92 season for the Griffin Park club and won the first silverware of his career in the form of the Third Division championship. Injury to Terry Evans saw Bates finally take over one of the centre back positions in the newly renamed First Division during the 1992–93 season, though the campaign ended with the league relegated back to the Second Division. Under new manager David Webb, Bates was paired at centre back with Shane Westley during the 1993–94 season and took over the captaincy from Billy Manuel.

==== 1994–1999 ====
1994–95 proved to be Bates' best season – paired with Barry Ashby in central defence, he won the club's Player of the Year award, but at the end of the season he failed to convert a penalty in a playoff semi-final shootout to the eventually-promoted club Huddersfield Town. The 1995–96 season was relatively uneventful, but things came together again in 1996–97, with Bates making 45 appearances and scoring two goals as Brentford reached the 1997 Second Division play-off final. The team, however, lost 1–0 to Crewe Alexandra at Wembley Stadium.

Bates improved his appearance tally to 47 in the 1997–98 season, but a poor campaign saw the Bees relegated to the Third Division on the final day. The takeover of the club by Ron Noades during the 1998 off-season (who installed himself as manager) brought an influx of money and younger players. Though he was still a regular, Bates was soon superseded as captain by new record-signing Hermann Hreiðarsson. He departed on a free transfer March 1999, after making 526 appearances and scoring 24 goals in 13 years at Griffin Park. As of September 2026, Bates is second behind Ken Coote on Brentford's all-time appearances list.

=== Wycombe Wanderers ===
Bates signed a two-year contract with Second Division club Wycombe Wanderers on 26 March 1999. It was his second spell with the club, after a brief loan during the 1986–87 season, while the Chairboys were members of the Isthmian League Premier Division. He made 101 appearances and scored seven goals before retiring at the end of the 2000–01 season. The highest profile match of Bates' career came in April 2001, when he played in the Chairboys' FA Cup semi-final versus Liverpool at Villa Park, though he gave away a free kick which led to Liverpool's second goal in the 2–1 defeat.

== Personal life ==
After retiring from professional football, Bates became a postman. As of July 2010, Bates was working as a courier for a company in Orpington.

== Career statistics ==
Appearances and goals by club, season and competition
Club	Season	League			FA Cup		League Cup		Other		Total	
Club	Season	Division	Apps	Goals	Apps	Goals	Apps	Goals	Apps	Goals	Apps	Goals
Brentford	1985–86	Third Division	0	0	0	0	0	0	0	0	0	0
Brentford	1986–87	Third Division	24	1	0	0	0	0	3 (Note: Appearances in Football League Trophy)	0	27	1
Brentford	1987–88	Third Division	23	1	0	0	1	0	2	0	26	1
Brentford	1988–89	Third Division	36	1	2	0	3	0	2	0	43	1
Brentford	1989–90	Third Division	15	0	0	0	3	0	3	0	21	0
Brentford	1990–91	Third Division	32	2	0	0	4	1	6 (Note: 4 appearances in Football League Trophy, 2 appearances in Third Division play-offs)	0	42	3
Brentford	1991–92	Third Division	42	1	3	1	5	0	2	0	52	2
Brentford	1992–93	First Division	24	0	0	0	4	1	7 (Note: Appearances in Anglo-Italian Cup)	1	35	2
Brentford	1993–94	Second Division	45	2	2	0	2	0	3	0	52	2
Brentford	1994–95	Second Division	38	2	1	0	2	0	4 (Note: 2 appearances in Football League Trophy, 2 appearances in Second Division play-offs)	0	45	2
Brentford	1995–96	Second Division	36	4	5	0	4	0	2	0	47	4
Brentford	1996–97	Second Division	37	2	3	0	4	0	6 (Note: 3 appearances in Football League Trophy, 3 appearances in Second Division play-offs)	0	50	2
Brentford	1997–98	Second Division	40	1	2	0	4	0	1	0	47	1
Brentford	1998–99	Third Division	27	1	3	1	4	1	2	0	36	3
Brentford	Total		419	18	21	2	40	3	43	1	526	24
Wycombe Wanderers (loan)	1986–87	Isthmian League Premier Division	1	0	—		—		—		1	0
Wycombe Wanderers	1998–99	Second Division	9	0	—		—		—		9	0
Wycombe Wanderers	1999–2000	Second Division	32	1	5	0	4	0	0	0	41	1
Wycombe Wanderers	2000–01	Second Division	39	3	7	2	4	1	1	0	51	6
Wycombe Wanderers	Total		81	4	12	2	8	1	1	0	102	7
Career total			500	22	33	4	48	4	44	1	625	31

== Honours ==
Brentford

- Football League Third Division: 1991–92, (Note: Third-tier.) 1998–99 (Note: Fourth-tier.)

Individual

- Brentford Supporters' Player of the Year: 1994–95
