= Graham Benstead =

English footballer (born 1963)

Personal information
- Full name: Graham Mark Benstead
- Date of birth: 20 August 1963 (age 63)
- Place of birth: Aldershot, England
- Height: 1.88 m (6 ft 2 in)
- Position: Goalkeeper

Team information
- Current team: Frimley Green (goalkeeping coach)

Youth career
- Wimbledon
- –1981: Queens Park Rangers

Senior career*
Years	Team	Apps	(Gls)
1981–1985	Queens Park Rangers	0	(0)
1985	→ Norwich City (loan)	1	(0)
1985–1988	Norwich City	15	(0)
1987	→ Colchester United (loan)	18	(0)
1988	→ Sheffield United (loan)		
1988–1990	Sheffield United	47	(0)
1990–1993	Brentford	112	(0)
1993	→ Kettering Town (loan)		
1994–1995	Kettering Town		
1995–1997	Rushden & Diamonds	45	(0)
1997	Kingstonian	0	(0)
1997–1998	Brentford	1	(0)
1998–1999	Basingstoke Town	19	(0)
1999	→ Chertsey Town (loan)		
2000–2003	Farnborough Town	5	(0)
2003–2004	Stevenage Borough	0	(0)

International career
1981	England Youth	1	(0)
1994	England Semi-Pro	3	(0)

Managerial career
- Farnborough Town (caretaker)
- * Club domestic league appearances and goals

Graham Mark Benstead (born 20 August 1963) is an English retired professional footballer who made over 110 appearances as a goalkeeper in the Football League for Brentford. He also played League football for Sheffield United, Colchester United, Norwich City and was capped by England at youth and semi-pro level. Benstead is goalkeeping coach at Frimley Green.

== Club career ==
=== Queens Park Rangers and Norwich City (1981–1988) ===
Born in Aldershot, Hampshire, Benstead began his career as a part-time player at Wimbledon and then entered the youth system at Queens Park Rangers. He signed his first professional contract in 1981. He had to wait until 8 January 1983 to make what would be his only appearance for the club, which came with a start in a 3–2 FA Cup third round defeat to West Bromwich Albion. After a loan spell with Norwich City late in the 1984–85 season, Benstead joined the newly relegated Second Division club at the end of the campaign for an initial £10,000 fee, with up to £35,000 in add-ons.

After promotion straight back to the First Division in 1985–86 and in the face of competition from new £100,000 signing Bryan Gunn, Benstead began the 1986–87 season as Norwich City's first-choice goalkeeper, but a shoulder injury suffered in November 1986 effectively ended his Carrow Road career. After loan spells with Colchester United and Sheffield United, he joined the latter club on a permanent contract for a £35,000 fee in 1988.

=== Sheffield United and Brentford (1988–1993) ===
Benstead was a regular for Sheffield United during the 1988–89 season, at the end of which the club celebrated promotion to the Second Division after a second-place finish. He lost his place to Simon Tracey during the 1989–90 season and made just one further appearance for the club before moving to Third Division Brentford in July 1990 for a £60,000 fee, with a further £10,000 to be paid after 25 appearances. Benstead had a successful first season with Brentford, missing just one match, keeping 23 clean sheets and winning the club's Supporters' and Players' Player of the Year awards. Despite suffering from hamstring and knee injuries, things were even better during the 1991–92 season, when the Bees finished the campaign as champions of the Third Division.

Despite missing four months of the 1992–93 First Division season with knee ligament damage and a hamstring injury, Benstead made 32 appearances during the campaign, which ended with relegation straight back to the Second Division. Benstead rejected the new contract offered to him during the 1993 off-season and was made available for loan. He failed to see eye-to-eye with new manager David Webb and made just seven early-1993–94 season appearances before joining Conference high-flyers Kettering Town on loan in October 1993. The deal was made permanent in December 1993, with Benstead signing on a free transfer. Benstead made 144 appearances during just over three seasons at Griffin Park.

=== Non-League football and return to Brentford (1993–1997) ===
Benstead's 18 months with Conference club Kettering ended with second and sixth-place finishes respectively and he dropped down to the Southern League Premier Division to move to Northamptonshire rivals Rushden & Diamonds in June 1995. He had an excellent 1995–96 season, helping the club to the Premier Division title and promotion to the Conference. Benstead made just seven appearances during the 1996–97 season and had a non-playing spell with Kingstonian, before making a surprise return to Brentford in July 1997, as player/goalkeeping coach on a week-to-week contract. Minor surgery required by first-choice goalkeeper Kevin Dearden meant that Benstead made his second debut for the club in a 3–1 defeat to York City on 11 October 1997. He made one further appearance in an FA Cup first round replay versus former club Colchester United on 25 November, before being released by new manager Micky Adams in January 1998.

=== Return to non-League football (1997–2004) ===
Benstead joined Isthmian League Premier Division club Basingstoke Town in 1998 and wound down his career with spells at Chertsey Town, Farnborough Town and Stevenage Borough.

== International career ==
Benstead was capped once by England youth and won three caps for England Semi-Pro in 1994.

== Coaching career ==
Benstead has worked as a goalkeeping coach at Brentford, Basingstoke Town, Chertsey Town, Farnborough Town, Stevenage Borough and Frimley Green. He served as caretaker manager of Farnborough Town for one match and in 2004 was assistant to manager Graham Westley at Stevenage Borough.

== Personal life ==
Benstead works as a self-employed painter and decorator.

== Career statistics ==
Appearances and goals by club, season and competition
Club	Season	League			FA Cup		League Cup		Other		Total	
Club	Season	Division	Apps	Goals	Apps	Goals	Apps	Goals	Apps	Goals	Apps	Goals
Queens Park Rangers	1982–83	Second Division	0	0	1	0	0	0	—		1	0
Norwich City (loan)	1984–85 (Note: Graham Benstead at WorldFootball.net)	First Division	1	0	—		—		—		1	0
Norwich City	1986–87	First Division	13	0	0	0	0	0	0	0	13	0
Norwich City	1987–88	First Division	2	0	0	0	—		0	0	2	0
Norwich City	Total		16	0	0	0	0	0	0	0	19	0
Colchester United (loan)	1987–88	Fourth Division	18	0	0	0	0	0	1 (Note: Appearances in Football League Trophy)	0	19	0
Brentford	1990–91	Third Division	45	0	3	0	4	0	9 (Note: Seven appearances in Football League Third Division play-offs, two appearances in Football League Trophy)	0	61	0
Brentford	1991–92	Third Division	37	0	1	0	2	0	2	0	42	0
Brentford	1992–93	First Division	25	0	1	0	2	0	4 (Note: Appearances in Anglo-Italian Cup)	0	32	0
Brentford	1993–94	Second Division	5	0	—		2	0	—		7	0
Brentford	Total		112	0	5	0	10	0	15	0	142	0
Rushden & Diamonds	1995–96	Southern League Premier Division	39	0	6	0	—		6 (Note: Three appearances in Northamptonshire Senior Cup, one appearance in FA Trophy, one appearance in Southern League Cup, one appearance in Northamptonshire Cup)	0	51	0
Rushden & Diamonds	1996–97	Conference	6	0	0	0	—		1 (Note: Appearance in Southern League Championship Shield)	0	7	0
Rushden & Diamonds	Total		45	0	6	0	—		7	0	58	0
Brentford	1997–98	Second Division	1	0	1	0	0	0	—		2	0
Brentford	Total		113	0	6	0	10	0	15	0	144	0
Basingstoke Town	1997–98	Isthmian League Premier Division	7	0	—		—		—		7	0
Basingstoke Town	1998–99	Isthmian League Premier Division	12	0	6	0	—		4 (Note: One appearance in FA Trophy, one appearance in Isthmian League Cup, one appearance in Isthmian League Full Members' Cup, one appearance in Hampshire Senior Cup)	0	22	0
Basingstoke Town	Total		19	0	6	0	—		4	0	29	0
Farnborough Town	2000–01	Isthmian League Premier Division	0	0	1	0	—		3 (Note: Two appearances in Isthmian League Cup, one appearance in Hampshire Senior Cup)	0	4	0
Farnborough Town	2001–02	Conference	5	0	0	0	—		3 (Note: Two appearances in Hampshire Senior Cup, one appearance in FA Trophy)	0	8	0
Farnborough Town	2002–03	Conference	0	0	0	0	—		0	0	0	0
Farnborough Town	Total		5	0	1	0	—		6	0	12	0
Stevenage Borough	2002–03	Conference	0	0	—		—		—		0	0
Stevenage Borough	2003–04	Conference	0	0	0	0	—		0	0	0	0
Stevenage Borough	2004–05	Conference	0	0	0	0	—		0	0	0	0
Stevenage Borough	Total		0	0	0	0	—		0	0	0	0
Career total			182	0	19	0	10	0	32	0	281	0

== Honours ==
Sheffield United

- Football League Third Division second-place promotion: 1988–89

Brentford

- Football League Third Division: 1991–92

Rushden & Diamonds

- Southern League Premier Division: 1995–96

Individual

- Brentford Supporters' Player of the Year: 1990–91
- Brentford Players' Player of the Year: 1990–91
