= Ashley Bayes =

English footballer (born 1972)

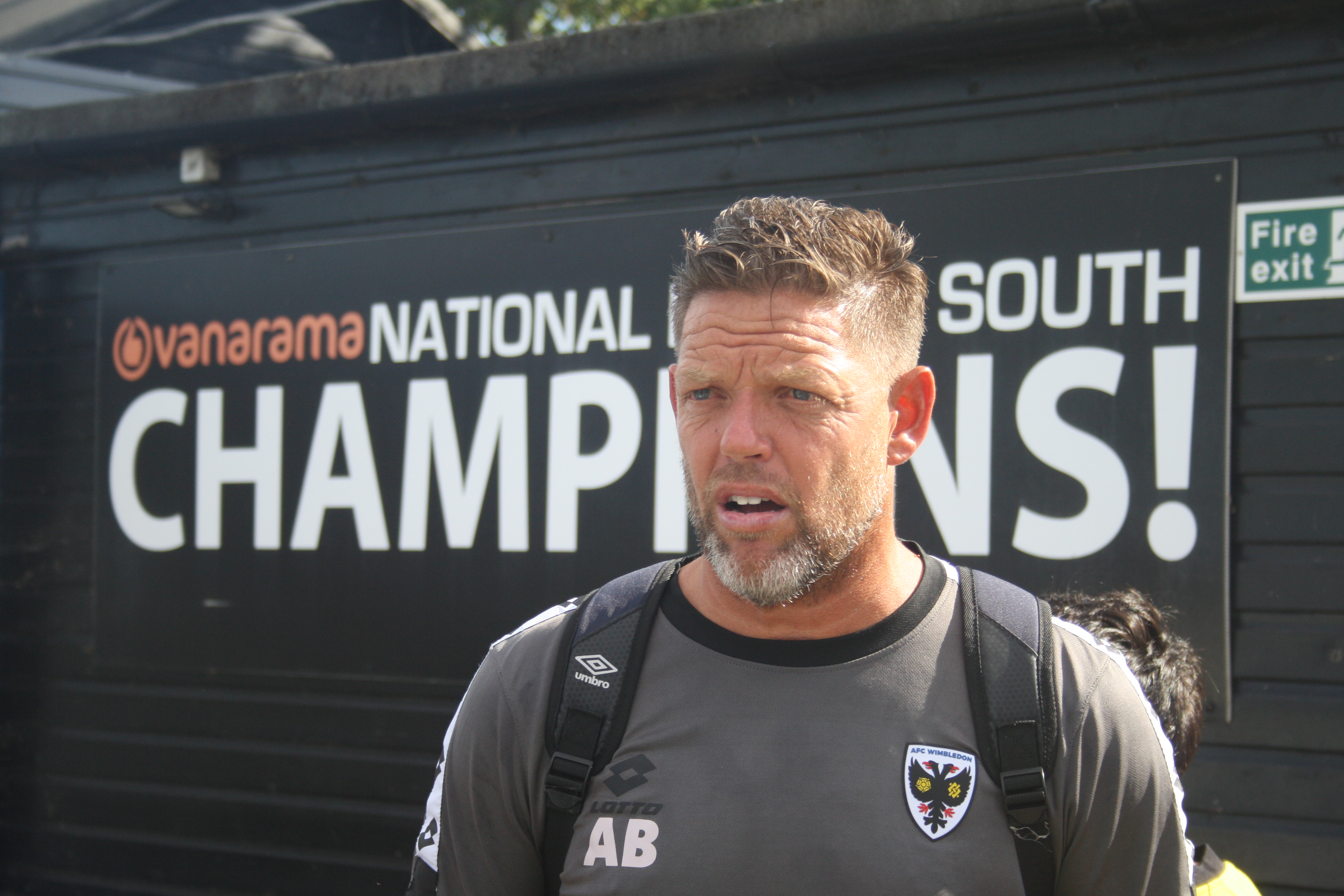
- Bayes with AFC Wimbledon in 2025

Personal information
- Full name: Ashley John Bayes
- Date of birth: 19 April 1972 (age 54)
- Place of birth: Lincoln, England
- Height: 6 ft 1 in (1.86 m)
- Position: Goalkeeper

Team information
- Current team: AFC Wimbledon (goalkeeping coach)

Youth career
- Nottingham Forest
- 1988–1990: Brentford

Senior career*
Years	Team	Apps	(Gls)
1990–1993	Brentford	4	(0)
1993–1996	Torquay United	97	(0)
1996–1999	Exeter City	127	(0)
1999–2002	Leyton Orient	69	(0)
2002–2003	Bohemians	33	(0)
2003–2004	Woking	40	(0)
2004	Hornchurch	10	(0)
2004–2007	Grays Athletic	84	(1)
2007–2008	Crawley Town	45	(0)
2008–2011	Stevenage	10	(0)
2011–2013	Basingstoke Town	74	(0)
2013–2015	AFC Wimbledon	0	(0)
Total		593	(1)

International career
1989	England Youth		
1991	England U18	1	(0)
- * Club domestic league appearances and goals

Ashley John Bayes (born 19 April 1972) is an English former professional footballer who played as a goalkeeper. He is goalkeeping coach at League One club AFC Wimbledon.

Bayes began his career at Brentford, making his first-team debut in March 1990, before establishing himself at Third Division club Torquay United, where he made 119 appearances across three seasons. He then spent three years at Exeter City, making 145 appearances, before joining Leyton Orient in July 1999. After three years at Orient, Bayes signed for League of Ireland club Bohemians in 2002, winning the league title in his first season. Returning to England, he played for Woking, Hornchurch, and Grays Athletic, where he won a Conference South title and two FA Trophy medals during a three-year spell.

After a season with Crawley Town, Bayes signed for Stevenage Borough in May 2008, helping the club win the FA Trophy in his first season and achieve back-to-back promotions from the Conference Premier to League One. He signed for Conference South club Basingstoke Town in June 2011 before joining AFC Wimbledon in June 2013 as a player-coach, eventually becoming the club's goalkeeping coach. Bayes also represented England at youth level.

== Early life ==
Born in Lincoln, Lincolnshire, Bayes began playing as a goalkeeper for local youth team Manor United. He grew up admiring goalkeepers Ray Clemence, Peter Shilton, and Neville Southall. He spent time as a schoolboy at Lincoln City, but the club's academy was disbanded following Lincoln's relegation from the Football League. While representing Lincolnshire's county team, he had trials with Newcastle United and Nottingham Forest, joining the latter for six months.

Bayes signed a two-year Youth Training Scheme contract with Brentford at the age of 15, initially travelling from his family home in Lincoln each weekend before moving to London. He struggled with homesickness at first, but later settled and regarded the experience as formative in developing his resilience.

== Club career ==
=== Early career ===
Bayes progressed through the Brentford academy and was playing for the under-18 team at the age of 15. He made his Football League debut on 20 March 1990 in a 2–2 draw with Preston North End, and signed his first professional contract two months later. He went on to make only three further league appearances over the next three seasons, leaving the club at the end of the 1992–93 season. He made 12 appearances for Brentford in all competitions, including in a League Cup match against Premier League club Tottenham Hotspur at White Hart Lane.

Following his departure from Brentford, Bayes joined Third Division club Torquay United on 13 August 1993, initially as second-choice to Matthew Lowe. He featured in 32 league matches and two play-off games in his first season, with Torquay losing to Preston North End in the play-off semi-final. He remained a regular during the 1994–95 season, making 37 league appearances. In his third and final year at Torquay, he lost his starting place to Ray Newland midway through the season, finishing with 28 appearances.

=== Exeter City ===
Ahead of the 1996–97 season, Bayes joined Exeter City of the Third Division on 31 July 1996, signing on a free transfer. He made his debut and registered a clean sheet in a 1–0 away victory against Mansfield Town on 17 August 1996, and went on to establish himself as the club's first-choice goalkeeper, making 46 appearances as Exeter avoided relegation to the Football Conference by a single point. He remained a regular during the 1997–98 season, making 50 appearances in all competitions. The following season, Bayes was named the club's Player of the Year after making 49 appearances in a mid-table campaign, with Exeter recording one of the best defensive records in the division. He made 145 appearances across his three seasons with the club.

=== Leyton Orient ===
At the end of the 1998–99 season, Bayes rejected a new two-year contract at Exeter and became the first player to leave the club under the Bosman ruling, joining fellow Third Division club Leyton Orient on 5 July 1999. He made his debut in a 2–1 defeat at Carlisle United on 7 August 1999, and played regularly during the first half of the season before losing his place to Scott Barrett in December 1999. Bayes regained his place towards the end of the season, finishing with 21 appearances in all competitions. During the 2000–01 season, he was the club's first-choice goalkeeper, making 51 appearances as Leyton Orient finished fifth in the league and reached the play-off final, where they lost 4–2 to Blackpool at the Millennium Stadium on 26 May 2001. A shoulder injury limited him to 14 appearances in the 2001–02 season, and he left the club at the end of the season when his contract expired, having made 86 appearances in total.

=== Bohemians ===
After a two-week trial, Bayes signed a three-year contract with League of Ireland club Bohemians on 31 May 2002. He made 33 appearances during the 2002–03 season, his only full season with the club, as Bohemians won the league title. The title was secured with a 1–0 victory over Shelbourne, in which Bayes made a key save with the match goalless. At the start of the following season, he lost his place to Seamus Kelly and, in March 2003, his contract was cancelled by mutual consent to allow him to return to England, two years before its expiry.

=== Woking ===
Later that month, Bayes signed a short-term deal with Conference National club Woking for the remainder of the 2002–03 season. He made five appearances in the last month of the season, keeping three clean sheets as the club avoided relegation. Bayes signed a one-year contract ahead of the 2003–04 season and played regularly, making 40 appearances, though briefly lost his place to loanee Scott Bevan.

=== Grays Athletic ===
At the end of the season, Bayes rejected a contract extension at Woking and joined Conference South club Hornchurch in May 2004. He made ten league appearances before leaving in November 2004 following the club's financial collapse. He then signed for divisional rivals Grays Athletic on 9 November 2004. He played regularly as the club won the league title by 23 points, conceding 31 goals in 42 matches. He scored the only goal of his career in a 3–0 victory against Havant & Waterlooville in April 2005, in Grays' final home match of the season, converting the rebound after missing a first-half penalty. He also featured in Grays' FA Trophy victory that season, saving two penalties in a 6–5 penalty shoot-out win over Hucknall Town in the final following a 1–1 draw after extra-time.

Bayes remained first-choice during the 2005–06 season, making 32 appearances as Grays lost in the play-off semi-finals to Halifax Town. He also helped the club retain the FA Trophy, saving a penalty in the semi-final second leg and then playing in the 2–0 victory over former club Woking in the final on 14 May 2006. He played 42 times during the 2006–07 season under manager Justin Edinburgh before being released in May 2007, ending a three-year spell with the club.

=== Crawley Town ===
Despite expressing a desire to rejoin Exeter City, Bayes signed a one-year contract with Conference Premier club Crawley Town on 19 June 2007. He made his debut in a 2–1 home victory over Stevenage Borough in the opening game of the 2007–08 season, and went on to make 46 appearances in all competitions. Crawley finished 15th in the league, despite a six-point deduction for breaching financial regulations.

=== Stevenage ===
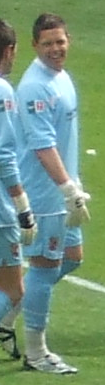
Bayes with Stevenage Borough after the 2009 FA Trophy Final.

Ahead of the 2008–09 season, Bayes signed for Stevenage Borough on a free transfer. He made his debut in a 5–0 defeat to Wrexham on 9 August 2008, and played in the following three matches. Following the arrival of Chris Day, Bayes featured less frequently, making nine appearances that season, including in the FA Trophy, which Stevenage went on to win.

Bayes featured five times during the 2009–10 season as the club earned promotion to the Football League for the first time after finishing as Conference Premier champions. He did not make any first-team appearances the following season but took on coaching responsibilities while Stevenage secured a second consecutive promotion via the play-offs. Bayes left the club in June 2011 to return to first-team football and focus on coaching.

=== Basingstoke Town ===
On the same day as his departure from Stevenage was confirmed, on 20 June 2011, Bayes signed for Conference South club Basingstoke Town. A week later, he joined Aldershot Town as a part-time goalkeeping coach while continuing as a player at Basingstoke. Named club captain ahead of the season, he was first-choice goalkeeper throughout the 2011–12 campaign, making 47 appearances as Basingstoke finished fifth and reached the play-offs, where they lost 3–1 on aggregate to eventual winners Dartford.

He remained at the club for the 2012–13 season, signing a one-year extension in March 2012, and made 40 appearances as Basingstoke finished 14th. Bayes left by mutual consent on 29 May 2013 to take up a full-time coaching role in the Football League, stating that the move was motivated by a desire to focus on his long-term coaching career. He made 87 appearances during his two years with the club.

=== AFC Wimbledon ===
Following his departure from Basingstoke, Bayes was appointed full-time goalkeeping coach at AFC Wimbledon by manager Neal Ardley on 19 June 2013. He was also registered as a player to provide additional cover if required, but did not make a competitive appearance for the club. He retired from playing at the end of the 2014–15 season to focus solely on coaching.

== International career ==
Bayes was selected for England at under-17, under-18, and under-19 level. He earned one cap for the under-18 team, playing in a 3–1 defeat to Mexico in Port of Spain on 27 March 1991.

== Coaching career ==
Bayes gained his coaching badges while still playing and began coaching part-time at Aldershot Town during the 2011–12 season. He was appointed full-time goalkeeping coach at AFC Wimbledon in June 2013, a position he has held since, working under five permanent managers.

== Career statistics ==
Appearances and goals by club, season and competition
Club	Season	League			FA Cup		League Cup		Other		Total	
Club	Season	Division	Apps	Goals	Apps	Goals	Apps	Goals	Apps	Goals	Apps	Goals
Brentford	1989–90	Third Division	1	0	0	0	0	0	0	0	1	0
Brentford	1990–91	Third Division	0	0	0	0	0	0	0	0	0	0
Brentford	1991–92	Third Division	1	0	0	0	0	0	0	0	1	0
Brentford	1992–93	First Division	2	0	0	0	0	0	0	0	2	0
Brentford	Total		4	0	0	0	0	0	0	0	4	0
Torquay United	1993–94	Third Division	32	0	0	0	0	0	2 (Note: Appearances in 1994 Third Division play-offs)	0	34	0
Torquay United	1994–95	Third Division	37	0	0	0	0	0	0	0	37	0
Torquay United	1995–96	Third Division	28	0	0	0	0	0	0	0	28	0
Torquay United	Total		97	0	0	0	0	0	2	0	99	0
Exeter City	1996–97	Third Division	41	0	2	0	2	0	1	0	46	0
Exeter City	1997–98	Third Division	45	0	2	0	2	0	1 (Note: Appearance(s) in Football League Trophy)	0	50	0
Exeter City	1998–99	Third Division	41	0	4	0	2	0	2	0	49	0
Exeter City	Total		127	0	8	0	6	0	4	0	145	0
Leyton Orient	1999–2000	Third Division	17	0	1	0	2	0	1	0	21	0
Leyton Orient	2000–01	Third Division	39	0	4	0	4	0	4 (Note: One appearance in Football League Trophy; three appearances in 2001 Third Division play-offs)	0	51	0
Leyton Orient	2001–02	Third Division	13	0	0	0	1	0	0	0	14	0
Leyton Orient	Total		69	0	5	0	7	0	5	0	86	0
Bohemians	2002–03	League of Ireland Premier Division	33	0	0	0	0	0	0	0	33	0
Bohemians	2003	League of Ireland Premier Division	0	0	0	0	0	0	0	0	0	0
Bohemians	Total		33	0	0	0	0	0	0	0	33	0
Woking	2002–03	Football Conference	5	0	0	0	—		0	0	5	0
Woking	2003–04	Football Conference	35	0	3	0	—		2 (Note: Appearance(s) in FA Trophy)	0	40	0
Woking	Total		40	0	3	0	0	0	2	0	45	0
Hornchurch	2004–05	Conference South	10	0	3	0	—		0	0	13	0
Grays Athletic	2004–05	Conference South	23	1	—		—		9 (Note: Eight appearances in FA Trophy; one appearance in Essex Senior Cup)	0	32	1
Grays Athletic	2005–06	Conference National	25	0	1	0	—		11 (Note: Seven appearances in FA Trophy; two appearances in Essex Senior Cup; two appearances in 2006 Conference National play-offs)	0	37	0
Grays Athletic	2006–07	Conference National	36	0	1	0	—		5	0	42	0
Grays Athletic	Total		84	1	2	0	0	0	25	0	111	1
Crawley Town	2007–08	Conference Premier	45	0	0	0	—		1 (Note: Appearance in Conference League Cup)	0	46	0
Stevenage	2008–09	Conference Premier	6	0	0	0	—		3 (Note: Two appearances in Conference League Cup; one appearance in FA Trophy)	0	9	0
Stevenage	2009–10	Conference Premier	4	0	0	0	—		1	0	5	0
Stevenage	2010–11	League Two	0	0	0	0	0	0	0	0	0	0
Stevenage	Total		10	0	0	0	0	0	4	0	14	0
Basingstoke Town	2011–12	Conference South	37	0	5	0	—		5 (Note: Three appearances in FA Trophy; two appearances in 2012 Conference South play-offs)	0	47	0
Basingstoke Town	2012–13	Conference South	37	0	2	0	—		1	0	40	0
Basingstoke Town	Total		74	0	7	0	0	0	6	0	87	0
AFC Wimbledon	2013–14	League Two	0	0	0	0	0	0	0	0	0	0
AFC Wimbledon	2014–15	League Two	0	0	0	0	0	0	0	0	0	0
AFC Wimbledon	Total		0	0	0	0	0	0	0	0	0	0
Career total			593	1	28	0	13	0	49	0	683	1

== Honours ==
Bohemians

- League of Ireland Premier Division: 2002–03

Grays Athletic

- Conference South: 2004–05
- FA Trophy: 2004–05, 2005–06

Stevenage

- Football League Two play-offs: 2011
- Conference Premier: 2009–10
- FA Trophy: 2008–09; runner-up: 2009–10

Individual

- Exeter City Player of the Year: 1998–99
