= Jim Carstairs =

Scottish footballer

Personal information
- Full name: James Wood Carstairs
- Date of birth: 29 January 1971 (age 55)
- Place of birth: St Andrews, Scotland
- Position: Left back

Youth career
- –1987: West Ham United
- 1987–1989: Arsenal

Senior career*
Years	Team	Apps	(Gls)
1989–1992	Arsenal	0	(0)
1991	→ Brentford (loan)	8	(0)
1991	→ Cambridge United (loan)	0	(0)
1991–1992	→ Stockport County (loan)	6	(0)
1992–1994	Stockport County	28	(1)
1994–1998	Enfield		
1999	St Albans City	4	(0)
- * Club domestic league appearances and goals

James Wood Carstairs (born 29 January 1971) is a Scottish former professional footballer who played in the Football League for Stockport County and Brentford as a left back.

== Career ==
=== Arsenal ===
Growing up in Chigwell, Carstairs began his career as a schoolboy at West Ham United and then served an apprenticeship at First Division club Arsenal. During the 1987–88 season, he was a part of the youth team which defeated Doncaster Rovers over two legs to win the FA Youth Cup. Despite signing a two-year professional contract, Carstairs failed to force his way into the first team picture.

Carstairs joined Third Division club Brentford on a one-month loan in February 1991, in an attempt to fill the club's problematic left back position. His loan was extended for a second month and he made 11 appearances before returning to Highbury after his loan expired in April. Carstairs joined Second Division club Cambridge United on loan in July 1991, but failed to make a league appearance. Following another loan during the first half of the 1991–92 season, Carstairs departed Arsenal on a permanent transfer.

=== Stockport County ===
Carstairs moved to Third Division club Stockport County on loan in November 1991. After seven appearances, he signed a permanent contract and made a total of 24 appearances during the 1991–92 season, though Stockport were denied promotion to the second-tier after defeat to Peterborough United in the 1992 Third Division play-off final. Carstairs made 23 appearances during the 1992–93 season and scored two goals. He largely failed to figure during the 1993–94 season, making just one Football League Trophy appearance. Carstairs departed the club during the season, having made 48 appearances and scored two goals during his time at Edgeley Park.

=== Enfield ===
After his departure from Stockport County, Carstairs returned to North London to drop into non-League football and sign for Isthmian League Premier Division club Enfield in 1994. He had four successful years with the club, winning the division title in his first season and finishing runner-up in 1995–96 and 1996–97. He departed the club at the end of the 1997–98 season.

=== St Albans City ===
Carstairs had a short spell at Isthmian League Premier Division club St Albans City towards the end of the 1998–99 season and made 11 appearances.

== Personal life ==
As of 1998, Carstairs was working as a sports development officer.

== Career statistics ==
Appearances and goals by club, season and competition
Club	Season	League			FA Cup		League Cup		Other		Total	
Club	Season	Division	Apps	Goals	Apps	Goals	Apps	Goals	Apps	Goals	Apps	Goals
Brentford (loan)	1990–91	Third Division	8	0	—		3	0	—		11	0
Stockport County	1991–92	Third Division	20	0	—		—		4 (Note: Appearances in Football League Trophy)	0	24	0
Stockport County	1992–93	Second Division	14	1	1	0	3	1	5	0	23	2
Stockport County	1993–94	Second Division	0	0	0	0	0	0	1	0	1	0
Stockport County	Total		34	1	1	0	3	1	10	0	48	2
St Albans City	1998–99	Isthmian League Premier Division	8	0	—		—		3 (Note: Appearances in FA Trophy)	0	11	0
Career total			50	1	1	0	6	1	13	0	70	2

== Honours ==
Enfield

- Isthmian League Premier Division: 1994–95
