= Ron Smillie =

English footballer

Personal information
- Full name: Ronald Drummond Smillie
- Date of birth: 27 September 1933
- Place of birth: Grimethorpe, Yorkshire, England
- Date of death: 17 August 2005 (aged 71)
- Place of death: Broomfield, Essex, England
- Position: Right wing

Youth career
- –: Barnsley

Senior career*
Years	Team	Apps	(Gls)
1951–1956	Barnsley	29	(1)
1956–1960	Lincoln City	91	(15)
1960–1962	Barnsley	85	(16)
1963–1966	Chelmsford City		
1966–1967	Margate		
1967–1968	Folkestone Town		
1968–1969	Dartford		
- * Club domestic league appearances and goals

Ronald Drummond Smillie (27 September 1933 – 17 August 2005) was an English footballer who scored 32 goals from 205 appearances in the Football League playing for Barnsley (in two spells) and Lincoln City. He played on the right wing. After leaving Barnsley he moved into the Southern League with Chelmsford City, Margate, Folkestone Town and Dartford.

Smillie's son Neil also played football professionally.
