= Jeremy Roberts (footballer) =

English footballer (born 1966)

Personal information
- Full name: Jeremy Roberts
- Date of birth: 24 November 1966 (age 59)
- Place of birth: Middlesbrough, England
- Height: 6 ft 0 in (1.83 m)
- Position: Goalkeeper

Youth career
- –: Hartlepool United

Senior career*
Years	Team	Apps	(Gls)
1983–1984	Hartlepool United	1	(0)
1984–1986	Leicester City	3	(0)
1986–1987	Luton Town	0	(0)
1987	Waterford United	2	(0)
1987–1988	Darlington	29	(0)
1988–1989	Brentford	5	(0)
–	Maidenhead United		
1989-1990	Gillingham	0	(0)
–	Whitby Town		

International career
1984	England Youth	1	(0)
- * Club domestic league appearances and goals

Jeremy Roberts (born 24 November 1966), sometimes known as Jerry Roberts, is an English former footballer who made 38 appearances in the Football League playing as a goalkeeper for Hartlepool United, Leicester City, Darlington and Brentford in the 1980s. A former England youth international born in Middlesbrough, Roberts was on the books of Luton Town and Gillingham without representing either in the League, played in the League of Ireland for Waterford United, and played non-league football for clubs including Maidenhead United and Whitby Town.
