= Phil Holder =

English footballer (born 1952)

Personal information
- Full name: Philip Holder
- Date of birth: 19 January 1952 (age 74)
- Place of birth: Kilburn, England
- Position: Midfielder

Youth career
- Tottenham Hotspur

Senior career*
Years	Team	Apps	(Gls)
1969–1974	Tottenham Hotspur	13	(1)
1975–1979	Crystal Palace	95	(5)
1978	Memphis Rogues	24	(1)
1978–1980	AFC Bournemouth	58	(4)
- Tonbridge
Total		180	(11)

International career
- England Youth

Managerial career
- 1990–1993: Brentford
- 1993: Watford (assistant)
- Southend United (assistant)
- Shimizu S-Pulse (assistant)
- * Club domestic league appearances and goals

Philip Holder (born 19 January 1952) is an English former association football player and manager. As player, he made more than 150 appearances in the Football League representing Tottenham Hotspur, Crystal Palace and AFC Bournemouth, and played in the North American Soccer League for the Memphis Rogues. As manager, he took charge of Brentford for three seasons.

== Career ==
Holder was born in Kilburn, London. He began his football career as an apprentice with Tottenham Hotspur in 1969 and remained with the club for five years. He played only 13 times in the Football League, but played six games in European competition, including a substitute appearance in the second leg of the 1974 UEFA Cup Final. He joined Crystal Palace in February 1975, and played 112 games in all competitions for the club, before spending a summer in the North American Soccer League with the Memphis Rogues. He returned to England and signed for AFC Bournemouth of the Fourth Division in March 1979, before his playing career ended due to a pelvic injury.

Holder then took up coaching, with clubs including Crystal Palace. He was appointed assistant to Brentford manager Steve Perryman in the late 1980s, and when Perryman resigned, Holder was confirmed as his successor in September 1990 after a spell in temporary charge. He guided them to the Third Division play-offs that season, only for the team to lose to Tranmere Rovers in the semi-final over two legs. In first leg at Griffin Park, a last minute equaliser from Kevin Godfrey gave Brentford hope, but later the same week, a 1–0 defeat at Prenton Park gave Tranmere the overall tie 3–2 on aggregate.

As a coach Holder will be best remembered for his success during the 1991–92 season. He guided a Brentford side spearheaded by prolific striker Dean Holdsworth to the Third Division title and gained them a place in the new Division One. With six matches of the season left, Holder told the players that they needed to win them all: they did so. On Boxing Day 1992, Brentford went 10th in Division One and were just three points short of the playoff zone. Holder was voted Manager of the Month for the division, and there was much speculation as to whether Brentford could mount a challenge for promotion to the Premiership. But a sharp decline set in and defeat in the final game of the season condemned "The Bees" to relegation to Division Two. Holder was sacked three days later.

In July 1993 he briefly joined Watford as Perryman's assistant, then assisted Peter Taylor at Southend United, and coached at Reading, before linking up with Perryman yet again in 1999, this time in Japan as assistant manager of J.League side Shimizu S-Pulse.

== Personal life ==
After leaving football, Holder entered the flower business.

== Honours ==
=== As a manager ===
Brentford

- Football League Division Three: 1991–92

=== As an individual ===
- Brentford Hall of Fame
