= John Uzzell =

English footballer

Personal information
- Full name: John Edward Uzzell
- Date of birth: 31 March 1959 (age 67)
- Place of birth: Plymouth, England
- Height: 5 ft 10 in (1.78 m)
- Position: Full-back

Youth career
- Plymouth Argyle

Senior career*
Years	Team	Apps	(Gls)
1977–1989	Plymouth Argyle	302	(6)
1989–1992	Torquay United	92	(2)
- * Club domestic league appearances and goals

John Edward Uzzell (born 31 March 1959) is an English retired footballer who played as a full-back.

Uzzell spent the majority of his playing career with hometown club Plymouth Argyle, between July 1977 and April 1989.

He also played for Torquay United, between 1989 and 1992, before moving into coaching. In later life, he also worked as a postman.

On 14 December 1991, while playing in a Third Division game for Torquay United at Plainmoor, he suffered a fractured cheekbone and eye socket in a collision with Brentford striker Gary Blissett, who was subsequently charged with causing grievous bodily harm with intent. However, Blissett was cleared of the charge at Salisbury Crown Court on 3 December 1992.

He now lives in Ivybridge, South Devon.
