= Tony Finnigan =

English footballer (born 1962)

Personal information
- Full name: Anthony Finnigan
- Date of birth: 17 October 1962 (age 64)
- Place of birth: Wimbledon, England
- Height: 6 ft 0 in (1.83 m)
- Position: Midfielder

Senior career*
| Years | Team | Apps | (Gls) |
| 1980–1982 | Fulham | | |
| 1982–1984 | Corinthian-Casuals | | |
| 1983 | Hendon | 2 | (0) |
| 1984–1988 | Crystal Palace | 105 | (10) |
| 1988–1990 | Blackburn Rovers | 36 | (0) |
| 1990 | Hull City | 18 | (1) |
| 1991 | Swindon Town | 3 | (0) |
| 1991–1992 | Brentford | 3 | (0) |
| 1992–1993 | Ernest Borel | | |
| 1993 | Hendon | 1 | (0) |
| 1993–1994 | Barnet | 6 | (0) |
| 1994 | Enfield | | |
| 1994–1996 | Fulham | 13 | (0) |
| 1996 | Falkirk | 9 | (1) |
| Total | | 193 | (12) |

International career
| 1981 | England Youth | 4 | (0) |
| 1981 | England U20 | 5 | (1) |
- * Club domestic league appearances and goals

Tony Finnigan (born 17 October 1962) is an English retired professional footballer who made nearly 200 appearances in the Football League. He was born in Wimbledon. After retirement he became a players' agent in partnership with Ian Wright and Andy Gray. He is also the partner of Stan Collymore in a television production company.

In his capacity as a players' agent, he has attracted controversy for supporting disgraced footballer Marlon King following the latter's criminal convictions.
