= Simon Line =

English footballer and manager (born 1971)

Personal information
- Date of birth: 1 November 1971 (age 54)
- Place of birth: York, England
- Height: 6 ft 0 in (1.83 m)
- Position: Forward

Youth career
- Crystal Palace

Senior career*
Years	Team	Apps	(Gls)
1990–1991	Crystal Palace	0	(0)
1991–1992	Brentford	0	(0)

Managerial career
- 2005–2009: Market Drayton Town
- 2009–2010: Hednesford Town
- 2010–2011: Market Drayton Town
- * Club domestic league appearances and goals

Simon Line (born 1 November 1971) is an English association football manager who was in charge of Hednesford Town and Market Drayton Town. As a player, he was on the books of Crystal Palace and Brentford, but played only one match at a professional level, a League Cup game for Brentford in 1991.

He managed Market Drayton Town until 2008, when he left to take the manager's job at Hednesford. He resigned from Hednesford on 14 January 2010 citing personal reasons. In February 2010 he returned to Market Drayton Town as manager but he was sacked in May 2011 by the club.
