= Graham Pearce (English footballer) =

English footballer

Personal information
- Full name: Graham Charles Pearce
- Date of birth: 8 July 1959 (age 67)
- Place of birth: Hammersmith, England
- Height: 5 ft 9 in (1.75 m)
- Position: Left back

Youth career
- 1971–1976: Brentford

Senior career*
Years	Team	Apps	(Gls)
1976–1979	Hillingdon Borough	72	(0)
1979–1982	Barnet	75	(4)
1982–1986	Brighton & Hove Albion	88	(2)
1986–1988	Gillingham	65	(0)
1989	Brentford	18	(0)
1989–1990	Maidstone United	27	(0)
1990–1992	Enfield	62	(3)
1992–1993	Basingstoke Town	20	(0)
1993–1995	Kingstonian	38	(1)
1995–1997	Harrow Borough	42	(0)
1997–1998	Molesey	20	(0)
- Corinthian-Casuals
Total		527	(10)

Managerial career
- 1990–1994: Brentford Reserves
- 1992–1994: Enfield (player-manager)
- 1997–1998: Molesey (player-manager)
- * Club domestic league appearances and goals

Graham Pearce (born 8 July 1959) is an English footballer who played as a left back in the Football League for Brighton and Hove Albion, Gillingham, Brentford and Maidstone United.

== Career ==
A left back, Pearce played in the Football League for Brighton and Hove Albion, Gillingham, Brentford and Maidstone United. He played for Brighton & Hove Albion in the 1983 FA Cup Final against Manchester United. He also played in the Conference for Barnet and was player-manager of Isthmian League clubs Enfield and Molesey. He returned to Brentford to serve as first team coach and reserve team coach in the early 1990s. His other coaching roles included first team coach at Farnborough and Stevenage Borough, Assistant Community Development Officer at Wimbledon, Kingston University and Sunday League club Brentford Athletic.

== Personal life ==
Pearce was born in Hammersmith, London. As of 1999, he was a physical education teacher at Homefield Preparatory School in Sutton, south London.

== Honours ==
Brighton & Hove Albion

- FA Cup runner-up: 1982–83
