= Keith Millen =

English footballer (born 1966)

Personal information
- Full name: Keith Derek Millen
- Date of birth: 26 September 1966 (age 60)
- Place of birth: Croydon, England
- Height: 6 ft 2 in (1.88 m)
- Position: Defender

Youth career
- 1980–1982: Southampton
- 1982–1983: Crystal Palace
- 1983: Brentford

Senior career*
Years	Team	Apps	(Gls)
1983–1994	Brentford	305	(17)
1994–1999	Watford	165	(5)
1999–2003	Bristol City	60	(4)
Total		530	(26)

Managerial career
- 2005: Bristol City (caretaker)
- 2010: Bristol City (caretaker)
- 2010–2011: Bristol City
- 2013: Crystal Palace (caretaker)
- 2014: Crystal Palace (caretaker)
- 2014–2015: Crystal Palace (caretaker)
- 2018: Milton Keynes Dons (caretaker)
- 2020: Örgryte IS
- 2021–2022: Carlisle United
- 2023: Gillingham (caretaker)
- 2024–2025: AFC Croydon Athletic
- * Club domestic league appearances and goals

Keith Derek Millen (born 26 September 1966) is an English football manager and former player who played as a centre back. He was most recently manager of AFC Croydon Athletic.

Millen was appointed as Steve Coppell's successor, after Coppell chose to resign from Bristol City and retire from football. Millen spent most of his professional career at Brentford, where he reached the Associate Members' Cup final in 1985, and won the Football League Third Division in 1992. After leaving Brentford in 1994, he finished his playing career with Watford and Bristol City. Following retirement, Millen remained at City as a member of the coaching staff. He was caretaker manager at Ashton Gate following Gary Johnson's departure towards the end of the 2009–10 season. He took charge of nine competitive matches, winning five, drawing three and losing once. He was caretaker manager at Crystal Palace for 4 matches in the 2013–14 season winning one drawing one and losing 2. He was again appointed caretaker manager at Crystal Palace on 14 August 2014. On 27 August 2014 Neil Warnock was appointed full-time manager and at that time Millen's role at the club was not certain. However, on 12 September 2014 it was reported that Warnock was happy for Millen to continue in the role of assistant manager at Crystal Palace. Millen was re-appointed as caretaker manager on 27 December 2014 after Warnock was sacked following a poor run of results. On 2 January 2015, Alan Pardew was appointed to replace Warnock, and Millen reverted to assistant manager. On 9 January 2017, after Sam Allardyce was appointed as manager, Millen left Crystal Palace.

== Playing career ==
=== Brentford ===
After spells as an apprentice at Southampton and Crystal Palace, Millen spent time as a junior at Brentford, before turning professional in 1983. Between then and 1994, he made 305 League appearances for the club, scoring 17 goals. He helped Brentford reach the final of the Associate Members' Cup in 1985, where they were defeated 3–1 by Wigan Athletic at Wembley Stadium.

He helped the club to the Football League Third Division title in 1991–92, and earned a testimonial match against Tottenham Hotspur in 1993 following ten years as a professional.

=== Watford ===
Millen joined Watford along with defensive partner Colin Foster in March 1994, helping them escape relegation that season. Although Watford were eventually relegated in 1996, Millen later played a part in the club achieving successive promotions under Graham Taylor between 1997 and 1999. In total, Millen made 165 appearances for Watford, scoring 5 goals.

=== Bristol City ===
Millen joined Bristol City in November 1999. In the 2000 Football League Trophy final at Wembley, Millen captained Bristol City in a 2–1 defeat to Stoke City. He played his last competitive game in August 2002, a 2–0 home win over Blackpool before retiring in 2003, and later joining the club's coaching staff.

== Coaching and managerial career ==
=== Bristol City ===
Following his retirement from football, Millen became under-17 manager at Bristol City. When Brian Tinnion was promoted to player-manager in 2004, he appointed Millen as his assistant. Under Tinnion's management City won 22 of 61 matches, and Millen was appointed as caretaker when Tinnion left the club. However, he publicly ruled himself out of the running to become the permanent manager. He was made caretaker manager of City when Gary Johnson left the club in March 2010, and became manager on a full-time basis on a three-year contract when Johnson's replacement, Steve Coppell, departed on 12 August 2010. Millen left the manager's position on 3 October 2011.

=== Crystal Palace ===
After a brief spell as head of coaching and development at Blackpool earlier in the year, Millen was appointed assistant manager at Crystal Palace in November 2012, following former Blackpool manager Ian Holloway. On 23 October 2013, Millen was appointed as caretaker manager after Holloway left by mutual consent.

On 26 November 2013, newly appointed Crystal Palace manager Tony Pulis announced that Millen would be kept as backroom staff.

After Tony Pulis' surprise departure from Crystal Palace on 14 August 2014 (only 2 days before the start of the new Premier League season) Millen was again appointed caretaker manager. However, when Neil Warnock was appointed permanent manager on 27 August 2014, Millen's future was not made clear. On 12 September 2014 it was reported that Neil Warnock was happy for Millen to continue as assistant manager at Crystal Palace.

On 27 December 2014, Millen took over as caretaker manager of Crystal Palace for a third time following Warnock being sacked. When Alan Pardew was appointed to replace Warnock on 2 January 2015 Millen reverted to assistant manager.

On 9 January 2017, subsequent to the appointment of Sam Allardyce as manager of Crystal Palace, it was announced that Millen had left the club. He then worked with the Tottenham Hotspur development squad while seeking a new first team role.

=== Milton Keynes Dons ===
On 23 January 2018, after a brief spell working on the coaching staff at Portsmouth, Millen joined League One club Milton Keynes Dons as assistant manager.

On 22 April 2018, following the mutual contract termination of first team manager Dan Micciche, Millen was appointed caretaker manager of the club.

=== Halmstads BK ===
Roy Hogdson helped Halmstads BK recruit Millen as assistant manager to Igor Krulj and joined the side in January 2019. After Igor Krulj was sacked, Millen continued as assistant manager under Magnus Haglund until leaving the club at the end of the 2019 season after the team failed to advance to the Swedish top division Allsvenskan.

=== Örgryte IS ===
After leaving Halmstads BK, Millen was appointed manager of Superettan side Örgryte IS, which he led for the 2020 season until being sacked in October the same year.

=== Carlisle United ===
On 26 October 2021, Millen was appointed manager of League Two side Carlisle United on an 18-month contract following the sacking of Chris Beech three weeks previously. On 23 February 2022, with the club sitting in the relegation zone in 23rd position, Millen left the club by mutual consent.

=== Gillingham ===
On 7 April 2023, Millen was appointed head of academy coaching at League Two side Gillingham. On 5 October 2023, following the sacking of Neil Harris, Millen took charge of the first team on an interim basis.

=== AFC Croydon Athletic ===
On 18 November 2024, Millen was appointed manager of Isthmian League South East Division side AFC Croydon Athletic. He departed the club on 14 February 2025 after recording just three wins from his 14 games in charge.

== Managerial statistics ==
As of 28 October 2023

Team	Nat	From	To	Record				
Team	Nat	From	To	G	W	D	L	Win %
Bristol City (caretaker)	(England)	11 September 2005	26 September 2005	3	1	1	1	33.33
Bristol City (caretaker)	(England)	18 March 2010	11 May 2010	9	5	3	1	55.56
Bristol City	(England)	12 August 2010	3 October 2011	57	18	12	27	31.58
Crystal Palace (caretaker)	(England)	23 October 2013	23 November 2013	4	1	1	2	25.00
Crystal Palace (caretaker)	(England)	14 August 2014	27 August 2014	3	1	0	2	33.33
Crystal Palace (caretaker)	(England)	27 December 2014	2 January 2015	2	0	2	0	0.00
Milton Keynes Dons (caretaker)	(England)	22 April 2018	6 May 2018	3	1	0	2	33.33
Carlisle United	(England)	26 October 2021	23 February 2022	22	6	5	11	27.27
Gillingham (caretaker)	(England)	5 October 2023	1 November 2023	6	2	0	4	33.33
AFC Croydon Athletic	(England)	18 November 2024	14 February 2025	14	3	4	7	21.43
Total				123	38	28	57	30.89

== Honours ==
=== As a player ===
Brentford

- Football League Third Division: 1991–92
- Associate Members' Cup runner-up: 1984–85

Watford

- Football League Second Division: 1997–98

Bristol City

- Football League Trophy runner-up: 1999–2000

Individual

- Brentford Supporters' Player of the Year: 1991–92
- Brentford Players' Player of the Year: 1991–92
- Brentford Hall of Fame

=== As a manager ===
Individual

- Football League Championship Manager of the Month: November 2010
