= Gary Blissett =

English footballer (born 1964)

Personal information
- Full name: Gary Paul Blissett
- Date of birth: 29 June 1964 (age 62)
- Place of birth: Manchester, England
- Height: 6 ft 1 in (1.85 m)
- Position: Forward

Senior career*
| Years | Team | Apps | (Gls) |
| 1983–1987 | Crewe Alexandra | 122 | (79) |
| 1987–1993 | Brentford | 233 | (105) |
| 1993–1997 | Wimbledon | 31 | (3) |
| 1995 | → Wycombe Wanderers (loan) | 4 | (2) |
| 1996 | → Crewe Alexandra (loan) | 10 | (1) |
| 1997 | Sembawang Rangers | 32 | (10) |
| 1997–2001 | SV Elversberg | 65 | (26) |
| Total | | 465 | (226) |
- * Club domestic league appearances and goals

Gary Blissett (born 29 June 1964) is an English former professional footballer who played as a forward.

He notably played in the Premier League for Wimbledon, and in the Football League for Crewe Alexandra, Brentford and Wycombe Wanderers. He finished his career in Singapore and Germany with Sembawang Rangers and SV Elversberg respectively.

== Career ==
Blissett scored over 100 league goals for Crewe Alexandra and Brentford. He picked up a Third Division title medal with Brentford in 1992.

In December 1992, Blissett was acquitted of grievous bodily harm after challenging for an aerial ball with Torquay United player John Uzzell in an away game at Plainmoor 12 months earlier. It was alleged by Uzzell that Blissett had deliberately elbowed him in the face, fracturing his eye socket, although the court did not agree with this. Blissett has always maintained that the incident was an accidental collision and video evidence of the challenge was deemed to show that Blissett kept his eyes on the ball and, furthermore, that in jumping to head an aerial ball, a player would typically raise one or both arms to gain height.

Blissett moved to Wimbledon summer 1993. He was mostly a substitute in his four seasons at Wimbledon, starting only ten matches and scoring three goals. He had a loan spell with Wycombe Wanderers during that time, and also a loan spell back at Crewe Alexandra, before leaving Wimbledon in 1997 for a brief spell with Sembawang Rangers in Singapore. He completed his playing career with a four-year spell in Germany at SV Elversberg.

== Personal life ==
Blissett is based in Florida where he is the Director of Coaching for Florida Premier FC Zephyrhills.

== Honours ==
Brentford

- Football League Division Three: 1991–92

Individual

- Brentford Hall of Fame
