= Neil Smillie =

English football player and manager (born 1958)

Personal information
- Full name: Neil Smillie
- Date of birth: 19 July 1958 (age 68)
- Place of birth: Barnsley, England
- Height: 5 ft 6 in (1.68 m)
- Position: Midfielder

Youth career
- 1974–1975: Crystal Palace

Senior career*
Years	Team	Apps	(Gls)
1975–1982	Crystal Palace	83	(7)
1977	→ Brentford (loan)	3	(0)
1978	→ Memphis Rogues (loan)	28	(2)
1979	→ Memphis Rogues (loan)	20	(5)
1982–1985	Brighton & Hove Albion	75	(2)
1985–1986	Watford	16	(3)
1986–1988	Reading	39	(0)
1988–1993	Brentford	172	(18)
1993–1995	Gillingham	53	(3)
Total		489	(40)

Managerial career
- 1995: Gillingham
- 1996: Wycombe Wanderers
- 1998–1999: Wycombe Wanderers
- * Club domestic league appearances and goals

Neil Smillie (born 19 July 1958) is an English former professional football player and manager. He played for a number of clubs, and appeared in the 1983 FA Cup final for Brighton & Hove Albion.

== Playing career ==
The son of the former Barnsley and Lincoln City player Ron Smillie, Neil Smillie was born in Barnsley. He began his career with Crystal Palace, where he spent seven years, during which he had a spell on loan at Brentford and also spent two summers playing for Memphis Rogues in the North American Soccer League. In 1982, he was sold to Brighton & Hove Albion. During his time with that club, he played in the 1983 FA Cup final, in which Brighton held Manchester United to a 2–2 draw before losing in a replay.

In 1985, Smillie moved to Watford for a fee of £100,000 but his spell at Vicarage Road was unsuccessful, with only 16 first-team appearances. In 1986, he moved on to Reading. Two years later, he moved again to Brentford, where he was a first-team regular for five years with over 170 appearances.

== Managerial career ==
In 1993, the new Gillingham manager Mike Flanagan made Smillie his first signing, appointing him as player-coach. Gillingham went into administration in 1995 and the receivers dismissed Flanagan as manager, appointing Smillie as manager for the remainder of the season.

When new owners took over Gillingham in summer 1995, Smillie moved to Wycombe Wanderers, where he served as youth team coach. He had a brief spell as caretaker manager in 1996 and, in 1998, gained the job on a permanent basis. He was sacked the following year.

== Personal life ==
As of July 2010, Smillie was working as Sports Marketing Manager for Nike UK and headed the company's talent ID scheme.

== Honours ==
Brighton & Hove Albion

- FA Cup runner-up: 1982–83

Reading

- Full Members' Cup: 1987–88

Brentford

- Football League Third Division: 1991–92
