= 1997–98 Brentford F.C. season =

English football team season

Brentford
1997–98 season
- Chairman: Tony Swaisland
- Manager: Kevin Lock (until 12 August 1997); Eddie May (12 August-5 November 1997); Micky Adams (from 5 November 1997)
- Stadium: Griffin Park
- Second Division: 21st (relegated)
- FA Cup: First round
- League Cup: Second round
- Football League Trophy: Second round
- Top goalscorer: League: Taylor (13); All: Taylor (18)
- Highest home attendance: 10,510
- Lowest home attendance: 3,424
- Average home league attendance: 5,029
| Home colours | Away colours |

During the 1997–98 English football season, Brentford competed in the Football League Second Division. Just 11 wins in 46 matches saw the club relegated to the Third Division on the final day of the season.

== Season summary ==
Following defeat in the 1997 Second Division play-off final, David Webb moved "upstairs" to become the club's new chief executive in August 1997. Formerly Brentford manager since the beginning of the 1993–94 season, Webb acquired a majority shareholding of the club as part of a consortium with Tony Swaisland (chairman) and John Herting (director). Days after the takeover, the spine of the previous season's team (Carl Asaba, Barry Ashby and Paul Smith) were sold for six-figure fees. Brian Statham was sold later in August and promising youngster Marcus Bent was transfer-listed. Replacements were found in the lower divisions, non-League and in Premier League reserve teams, with Paul Barrowcliff, Derek Bryan, Leon Townley, Ricky Reina and Charlie Oatway arriving for five-figure fees. First team coach Kevin Lock took caretaker charge of the club until the appointment of Eddie May as manager four days after the regular season began. Clive Walker installed as May's assistant.

A 3–0 defeat to Millwall on the opening day saw Brentford begin the season bottom of the Second Division. Despite registering two wins in late-August and early-September to move into mid-table, just two wins in the following 13 matches in all competitions saw May and Walker removed from their posts on 4 November. David Webb resigned as chief executive, but remained on the board of directors, amidst rumours he had fallen out with chairman Swaisland. Former Swansea City manager Micky Adams was installed as manager and fared little better, failing to win until mid-December.

In a bid to strengthen the team, Adams sought experienced players and signed Glenn Cockerill (as player-assistant manager), Warren Aspinall and loanee Nigel Gleghorn. Injuries soon began to mount, with first-choice right back Ijah Anderson and off-season signings Derek Bryan and Ricky Reina succumbing. Continuing player sales and bad results led some Brentford supporters to call for the removal of David Webb. Multiple protests were staged over a disparity between the incoming and outgoing transfer fees and questioning where the incoming money was going.

It wasn't until late-January 1998 that the team found some form, losing just once in 12 matches, but registering seven draws. Brentford went into the final day of the season one place above the relegation zone, having won just one of the previous four matches. A win away to play-off contenders Bristol Rovers (themselves needing to win) or other favourable results were required for the Bees to retain their Second Division status. A 2–1 defeat and victory for 22nd-place Burnley relegated Brentford to the Third Division for the first time in 20 years.

== League table ==
| Pos | Team | Pld | W | D | L | GF | GA | GD | Pts | Promotion or relegation |
|---|---|---|---|---|---|---|---|---|---|---|
| 19 | Walsall | 46 | 14 | 12 | 20 | 43 | 52 | −9 | 54 | |
| 20 | Burnley | 46 | 13 | 13 | 20 | 55 | 65 | −10 | 52 | |
| 21 | Brentford (R) | 46 | 11 | 17 | 18 | 50 | 71 | −21 | 50 | Relegation to the Third Division |
| 22 | Plymouth Argyle (R) | 46 | 12 | 13 | 21 | 55 | 70 | −15 | 49 | Relegation to the Third Division |
| 23 | Carlisle United (R) | 46 | 12 | 8 | 26 | 57 | 73 | −16 | 44 | Relegation to the Third Division |

Rules for classification: In the Football League goals scored (GF) takes precedence over goal difference (GD).
(R) Relegated

== Results ==
Brentford's goal tally listed first.

=== Legend ===
| Win | Draw | Loss |

=== Pre-season and friendlies ===
| Date | Opponent | Venue | Result | Attendance | Scorer(s) |
|---|---|---|---|---|---|
| 16 July 1997 | Hampton | A | 3–0 | n/a | Anderson, Dennis, Bent |
| 21 July 1997 | Hertford Town | A | 5–0 | n/a | Spencer (2), Hurdle (2), Asaba |
| 23 July 1997 | Chertsey Town | A | 4–0 | n/a | Taylor, Spencer, Rapley, Canham (pen) |
| 26 July 1997 | Dover Athletic | A | 2–0 | n/a | Taylor, Myall |
| 29 July 1997 | Wimbledon | H | 1–3 | 2,322 | Asaba |
| 31 July 1997 | Yeading | A | 1–0 | n/a | Rapley |
| 2 August 1997 | Hayes | A | 0–3 | n/a | |
| 6 December 1997 | St Albans City | A | 5–3 | n/a | Denys (2), Spencer, Hurdle, Omigie |
| 27 January 1998 | Kingstonian | A | 1–1 | n/a | Goddard |
| 23 March 1998 | Kingstonian | A | 0–1 | n/a | |
| 4 May 1998 | Feltham | A | 4–4 | n/a | Bryan (2), Rapley, Adams |

=== Football League Second Division ===
| No. | Date | Opponent | Venue | Result | Attendance | Scorer(s) |
|---|---|---|---|---|---|---|
| 1 | 9 August 1997 | Millwall | A | 0–3 | 8,951 | |
| 2 | 16 August 1997 | Chesterfield | H | 0–0 | 4,000 | |
| 3 | 23 August 1997 | Watford | A | 1–3 | 10,125 | Taylor (pen) |
| 4 | 30 August 1997 | Grimsby Town | H | 3–1 | 3,875 | Rapley, Taylor (2) |
| 5 | 2 September 1997 | Gillingham | H | 2–0 | 4,903 | Bent, Taylor (pen) |
| 6 | 5 September 1997 | Southend United | A | 1–3 | 3,387 | Rapley |
| 7 | 13 September 1997 | Plymouth Argyle | A | 0–0 | 4,394 | |
| 8 | 19 September 1997 | Wycombe Wanderers | H | 1–1 | 3,755 | Taylor |
| 9 | 27 September 1997 | Burnley | H | 2–1 | 4,317 | Hutchings, Rapley |
| 10 | 4 October 1997 | Preston North End | A | 1–2 | 8,954 | Bent |
| 11 | 11 October 1997 | York City | A | 1–3 | 2,831 | Taylor |
| 12 | 18 October 1997 | Walsall | H | 3–0 | 4,874 | Taylor, Denys, Bent |
| 13 | 21 October 1997 | Bristol Rovers | H | 2–3 | 3,967 | Bent, Rapley |
| 14 | 25 October 1997 | Luton Town | A | 0–2 | 6,494 | |
| 15 | 1 November 1997 | Bournemouth | A | 0–0 | 4,772 | |
| 16 | 4 November 1997 | Carlisle United | H | 0–1 | 3,424 | |
| 17 | 8 November 1997 | Bristol City | H | 1–4 | 6,162 | Reina |
| 18 | 18 November 1997 | Northampton Town | A | 0–4 | 5,227 | |
| 19 | 22 November 1997 | Oldham Athletic | A | 1–1 | 5,012 | Scott |
| 20 | 29 November 1997 | Wrexham | H | 1–1 | 3,748 | Aspinall |
| 21 | 2 December 1997 | Fulham | A | 1–1 | 10,783 | Gleghorn |
| 22 | 13 December 1997 | Blackpool | H | 3–1 | 3,725 | Taylor, Townley (2) |
| 23 | 20 December 1997 | Wigan Athletic | A | 0–4 | 3,301 | |
| 24 | 26 December 1997 | Southend United | H | 1–1 | 5,341 | Taylor |
| 25 | 29 December 1997 | Gillingham | A | 1–3 | 5,786 | Taylor |
| 26 | 3 January 1998 | Chesterfield | A | 0–0 | 4,049 | |
| 27 | 10 January 1998 | Millwall | H | 2–1 | 5,529 | Taylor, Aspinall |
| 28 | 17 January 1998 | Grimsby Town | A | 0–4 | 4,886 | |
| 29 | 24 January 1998 | Watford | H | 1–2 | 6,969 | Rapley |
| 30 | 31 January 1998 | Plymouth Argyle | H | 3–1 | 4,783 | Bates, Scott, Hogg |
| 31 | 7 February 1998 | Wycombe Wanderers | A | 0–0 | 6,328 | |
| 32 | 14 February 1998 | Preston North End | H | 0–0 | 4,952 | |
| 33 | 21 February 1998 | Burnley | A | 1–1 | 10,097 | Taylor |
| 34 | 24 February 1998 | Walsall | A | 0–0 | 3,166 | |
| 35 | 28 February 1998 | York City | H | 1–2 | 4,490 | McGhee |
| 36 | 3 March 1998 | Bristol City | A | 2–2 | 10,398 | Bryan, Rapley |
| 37 | 7 March 1998 | Bournemouth | H | 3–2 | 4,973 | Hutchings, Bryan, Rapley |
| 38 | 14 March 1998 | Carlisle United | A | 2–1 | 6,021 | Hogg, Scott |
| 39 | 21 March 1998 | Northampton Town | H | 0–0 | 5,746 | |
| 40 | 28 March 1998 | Oldham Athletic | H | 2–1 | 4,547 | Scott, Taylor |
| 41 | 4 April 1998 | Wrexham | A | 2–2 | 3,654 | Rapley, Hutchings |
| 42 | 11 April 1998 | Fulham | H | 0–2 | 10,510 | |
| 43 | 13 April 1996 | Blackpool | A | 2–1 | 3,926 | Hutchings, Aspinall (pen) |
| 44 | 18 April 1998 | Wigan Athletic | H | 0–2 | 4,480 | |
| 45 | 25 April 1998 | Luton Town | H | 2–2 | 6,598 | Scott, Hutchings |
| 46 | 2 May 1998 | Bristol Rovers | A | 1–2 | 9,043 | Rapley |

=== FA Cup ===
| Round | Date | Opponent | Venue | Result | Attendance | Scorer(s) |
|---|---|---|---|---|---|---|
| R1 | 15 November 1997 | Colchester United | H | 2–2 | 2,899 | Taylor (2) |
| R1 (replay) | 25 November 1997 | Colchester United | A | 0–0 (a.e.t.), lost 4–2 on pens) | 3,613 | Smith, Taylor (2), Bent |

=== Football League Cup ===
| Round | Date | Opponent | Venue | Result | Attendance | Scorer(s) |
|---|---|---|---|---|---|---|
| R1 (1st leg) | 12 August 1997 | Shrewsbury Town | H | 1–1 | 2,040 | Denys |
| R1 (2nd leg) | 26 August 1997 | Shrewsbury Town | A | 5–3 (won 6–4 on aggregate) | 2,136 | Rapley (2), Taylor (2), Bent |
| R2 (1st leg) | 17 September 1997 | Southampton | A | 1–3 | 8,004 | Taylor |
| R2 (2nd leg) | 30 September 1997 | Southampton | H | 0–2 (lost 5–1 on aggregate) | 3,957 | |

=== Football League Trophy ===
| Round | Date | Opponent | Venue | Result | Attendance | Scorer(s) |
|---|---|---|---|---|---|---|
| SR2 | 13 January 1998 | Luton Town | A | 1–2 | 3,106 | Townley |

- Sources: Soccerbase, 11v11, Griffin Gazette, The Big Brentford Book of the Nineties

== Playing squad ==
Players' ages are as of the opening day of the 1997–98 season.

| Position | Name | Nationality | Date of birth (age) | Signed from | Signed in | Notes |
Goalkeepers
| GK | Kevin Dearden | (England) | 8 March 1970 (aged 27) | Tottenham Hotspur | 1993 | |
Defenders
| DF | Micky Adams | (England) | 8 November 1961 (aged 35) | Swansea City | 1997 | Manager |
| DF | Ijah Anderson | (England) | 30 December 1975 (aged 21) | Southend United | 1995 | |
| DF | Jamie Bates (c) | (England) | 24 February 1968 (aged 29) | Youth | 1986 | |
| DF | Danny Cullip | (England) | 17 September 1976 (aged 20) | Fulham | 1998 | |
| DF | Graeme Hogg | (Scotland) | 17 June 1964 (aged 33) | Notts County | 1998 | |
| MF | Carl Hutchings | (England) | 24 September 1974 (aged 22) | Youth | 1993 | |
| DF | Leon Townley | (England) | 16 February 1976 (aged 21) | Tottenham Hotspur | 1997 | |
| DF | Paul Watson | (England) | 4 January 1975 (aged 22) | Fulham | 1997 | Loaned from Fulham before transferring permanently |
Midfielders
| MF | Warren Aspinall | (England) | 13 September 1967 (aged 29) | Carlisle United | 1997 | |
| MF | Paul Barrowcliff | (England) | 15 June 1969 (aged 28) | Stevenage Borough | 1997 | Loaned to Stevenage Borough |
| MF | Steven Blaney | (Wales) | 24 March 1977 (aged 20) | West Ham United | 1993 | |
| MF | Scott Canham | (England) | 11 November 1974 (aged 22) | West Ham United | 1996 | |
| MF | Dean Clark | (England) | 31 March 1980 (aged 17) | Youth | 1997 | |
| MF | Glenn Cockerill | (England) | 25 August 1959 (aged 37) | Fulham | 1997 | Assistant manager |
| MF | Kevin Dennis | (England) | 14 December 1976 (aged 20) | Arsenal | 1996 | |
| MF | Ryan Denys | (England) | 16 August 1978 (aged 18) | Youth | 1997 | Loaned to Yeovil Town |
| MF | David McGhee | (England) | 19 June 1976 (aged 21) | Youth | 1994 | |
| MF | Charlie Oatway | (England) | 28 November 1973 (aged 23) | Torquay United | 1997 | |
Forwards
| FW | Derek Bryan | (England) | 11 November 1974 (aged 22) | Hampton | 1997 | |
| FW | Malcolm McPherson | (Scotland) | 9 December 1974 (aged 22) | West Ham United | 1996 | |
| FW | Kevin Rapley | (England) | 21 September 1977 (aged 19) | Youth | 1997 | |
| FW | Andy Scott | (England) | 2 August 1972 (aged 25) | Sheffield United | 1997 | |
| FW | Robert Taylor | (England) | 30 April 1971 (aged 26) | Leyton Orient | 1994 | |
| FW | Niall Thompson | (Canada) | 16 April 1974 (aged 23) | Zultse VV | 1998 | |
Players who left the club mid-season
| GK | Graham Benstead | (England) | 20 August 1963 (aged 33) | Kingstonian | 1997 | Goalkeeping coach, released |
| GK | Nick Colgan | (Republic of Ireland) | 19 September 1973 (aged 23) | Chelsea | 1997 | Returned to Chelsea after loan |
| GK | Tamer Fernandes | (England) | 7 December 1974 (aged 22) | Youth | 1993 | Loaned to Peterborough United, released |
| GK | Mike Pollitt | (England) | 29 February 1972 (aged 25) | Notts County | 1998 | Returned to Notts County after loan |
| DF | Gareth Hall | (Wales) | 20 March 1969 (aged 28) | Sunderland | 1997 | Returned to Sunderland after loan |
| DF | Gus Hurdle | (Barbados) | 14 October 1973 (aged 23) | Carshalton Athletic | 1993 | Released |
| DF | Stuart Myall | (England) | 12 November 1974 (aged 22) | Brighton & Hove Albion | 1996 | Released |
| MF | Nigel Gleghorn | (England) | 12 August 1962 (aged 34) | Burnley | 1997 | Returned to Burnley after loan |
| MF | Richard Goddard | (England) | 31 March 1978 (aged 19) | Arsenal | 1996 | Transferred to Woking |
| MF | Simon Spencer | (England) | 10 September 1976 (aged 20) | Tottenham Hotspur | 1997 | Released |
| MF | Simon Wormull | (England) | 1 December 1976 (aged 20) | Tottenham Hotspur | 1997 | Released |
| FW | Marcus Bent | (England) | 19 May 1978 (aged 19) | Youth | 1995 | Transferred to Crystal Palace |
| FW | Joe Omigie | (England) | 13 June 1972 (aged 23) | Donna | 1994 | Released |
| FW | Ricky Reina | (England) | 2 October 1971 (aged 25) | Dover Athletic | 1997 | Retired |

- Source: Soccerbase

== Coaching staff ==
=== Kevin Lock (1 – 12 August 1997) ===
| Name | Role |
|---|---|
| (England) Kevin Lock | Caretaker Manager |
| (England) Graham Benstead | Goalkeeping Coach |
| (England) Keith Allinson | Physiotherapist |
| (England) Fergus Dignan | Medical Officer |

=== Eddie May (12 August – 5 November 1997) ===
| Name | Role |
|---|---|
| (England) Eddie May | Manager |
| (England) Clive Walker | Assistant Manager |
| (England) Graham Benstead | Goalkeeping Coach |
| (England) Kevin Lock | Football Coordinator |
| (England) Keith Allinson | Physiotherapist |
| (England) Fergus Dignan | Medical Officer |

=== Micky Adams (5 November 1997 – 2 May 1998) ===
| Name | Role |
|---|---|
| (England) Micky Adams | Manager |
| (England) Glenn Cockerill | Assistant Manager |
| (England) Kevin Lock | Football Coordinator |
| (England) Stuart Bevis | Physiotherapist |
| (England) Fergus Dignan | Medical Officer |
| (England) Colin Martin | Medical Officer |

== Statistics ==
=== Appearances and goals ===
Substitute appearances in brackets.

| Pos | Nat | Name | League | | FA Cup | | League Cup | | FL Trophy | | Total | |
| Pos | Nat | Name | Apps | Goals | Apps | Goals | Apps | Goals | Apps | Goals | Apps | Goals |
|---|---|---|---|---|---|---|---|---|---|---|---|---|
| GK | (England) | Graham Benstead | 1 | 0 | 0 (1) | 0 | 0 | 0 | — | | 1 (1) | 0 |
| GK | (England) | Kevin Dearden | 35 | 0 | 2 | 0 | 4 | 0 | 1 | 0 | 42 | 0 |
| DF | (England) | Micky Adams | 0 | 0 | 0 | 0 | — | | 0 (1) | 0 | 0 (1) | 0 |
| DF | (England) | Ijah Anderson | 17 | 0 | 0 | 0 | 4 | 0 | 0 | 0 | 21 | 0 |
| DF | (England) | Jamie Bates | 40 | 1 | 2 | 0 | 4 | 0 | 1 | 0 | 47 | 1 |
| DF | (England) | Danny Cullip | 13 | 0 | — | | — | | — | | 13 | 0 |
| DF | (Scotland) | Graeme Hogg | 17 | 2 | — | | — | | — | | 17 | 2 |
| DF | (Barbados) | Gus Hurdle | 17 | 0 | 1 (1) | 0 | 4 | 0 | 0 | 0 | 22 (1) | 0 |
| DF | (England) | Carl Hutchings | 43 | 5 | 2 | 0 | 4 | 0 | 0 | 0 | 49 | 5 |
| DF | (England) | Stuart Myall | 2 | 0 | 0 | 0 | 0 | 0 | 0 | 0 | 2 | 0 |
| DF | (England) | Leon Townley | 15 (1) | 2 | 1 | 0 | 1 | 0 | 1 | 1 | 18 (1) | 3 |
| DF | (England) | Paul Watson | 25 | 0 | — | | — | | 0 | 0 | 25 | 0 |
| MF | (England) | Warren Aspinall | 24 | 3 | — | | — | | 1 | 0 | 25 | 3 |
| MF | (England) | Paul Barrowcliff | 5 (6) | 0 | 2 | 0 | 3 | 0 | 0 | 0 | 10 (6) | 0 |
| MF | (Wales) | Steven Blaney | 4 (1) | 0 | — | | — | | — | | 4 (1) | 0 |
| MF | (England) | Scott Canham | 11 (11) | 0 | 0 (1) | 0 | 2 (2) | 0 | 1 | 0 | 14 (14) | 0 |
| MF | (England) | Dean Clark | 0 (4) | 0 | 0 | 0 | 0 | 0 | 0 (1) | 0 | 0 (5) | 0 |
| MF | (England) | Glenn Cockerill | 23 | 0 | 2 | 0 | — | | 0 | 0 | 25 | 0 |
| MF | (England) | Kevin Dennis | 0 (5) | 0 | 0 | 0 | 0 | 0 | 0 (1) | 0 | 0 (6) | 0 |
| MF | (England) | Ryan Denys | 12 (7) | 1 | 0 | 0 | 4 | 1 | 0 | 0 | 16 (7) | 2 |
| MF | (England) | Richard Goddard | 0 | 0 | 0 | 0 | 0 (2) | 0 | 0 | 0 | 0 (2) | 0 |
| MF | (England) | David McGhee | 19 (10) | 1 | 2 | 0 | 2 | 0 | 0 | 0 | 23 (10) | 1 |
| MF | (England) | Charlie Oatway | 30 (3) | 0 | 2 | 0 | 0 | 0 | 0 | 0 | 32 (3) | 0 |
| MF | (England) | Simon Spencer | 1 | 0 | 0 | 0 | 1 | 0 | 0 | 0 | 2 | 0 |
| MF | (England) | Simon Wormull | 3 (2) | 0 | 0 | 0 | 1 (1) | 0 | 1 | 0 | 5 (3) | 0 |
| FW | (England) | Marcus Bent | 19 (5) | 4 | 2 | 0 | 3 | 1 | — | | 24 (5) | 5 |
| FW | (England) | Derek Bryan | 2 (9) | 2 | 0 | 0 | 0 | 0 | 0 | 0 | 2 (9) | 2 |
| FW | (Scotland) | Malcolm McPherson | 7 (2) | 0 | 1 | 0 | 0 | 0 | 0 | 0 | 8 (2) | 0 |
| FW | (England) | Joe Omigie | 0 (1) | 0 | 0 | 0 | 0 | 0 | 0 | 0 | 0 (1) | 0 |
| FW | (England) | Kevin Rapley | 23 (14) | 9 | 0 (1) | 0 | 3 (1) | 2 | 1 | 0 | 27 (16) | 11 |
| FW | (England) | Ricky Reina | 2 (4) | 1 | 2 | 0 | 0 (1) | 0 | 0 | 0 | 4 (5) | 1 |
| FW | (England) | Andy Scott | 24 (2) | 5 | 0 | 0 | — | | 1 | 0 | 25 (2) | 5 |
| FW | (England) | Robert Taylor | 39 (1) | 13 | 1 | 2 | 4 | 3 | 1 | 0 | 45 (1) | 18 |
| FW | (Canada) | Niall Thompson | 6 (2) | 0 | — | | — | | — | | 6 (2) | 0 |
Players loaned in during the season
| GK | (Republic of Ireland) | Nick Colgan | 5 | 0 | — | | — | | — | | 5 | 0 |
| GK | (England) | Mike Pollitt | 5 | 0 | — | | — | | — | | 5 | 0 |
| DF | (Wales) | Gareth Hall | 6 | 0 | — | | — | | — | | 6 | 0 |
| MF | (England) | Nigel Gleghorn | 11 | 1 | 0 | 0 | — | | 1 | 0 | 12 | 1 |

- Players listed in italics left the club mid-season.
- Source: Soccerbase

=== Goalscorers ===
| Pos | Nat | Player | FL2 | FAC | FLC | FLT | Total |
|---|---|---|---|---|---|---|---|
| FW | (England) | Robert Taylor | 13 | 2 | 3 | 0 | 18 |
| FW | (England) | Kevin Rapley | 9 | 0 | 2 | 0 | 11 |
| FW | (England) | Andy Scott | 5 | 0 | — | 0 | 5 |
| DF | (England) | Carl Hutchings | 5 | 0 | 0 | 0 | 5 |
| FW | (England) | Marcus Bent | 4 | 0 | 1 | — | 5 |
| MF | (England) | Warren Aspinall | 3 | — | — | 0 | 3 |
| DF | (England) | Leon Townley | 2 | 0 | 0 | 1 | 3 |
| DF | (Scotland) | Graeme Hogg | 2 | — | — | — | 2 |
| FW | (England) | Derek Bryan | 2 | 0 | 0 | 0 | 2 |
| MF | (England) | Ryan Denys | 1 | 0 | 1 | 0 | 2 |
| MF | (England) | Nigel Gleghorn | 1 | — | — | — | 1 |
| DF | (England) | Jamie Bates | 1 | 0 | 0 | 0 | 1 |
| MF | (England) | David McGhee | 1 | 0 | 0 | 0 | 1 |
| FW | (England) | Ricky Reina | 1 | 0 | 0 | 0 | 1 |
| Total | | | 50 | 2 | 7 | 1 | 60 |

- Players listed in italics left the club mid-season.
- Source: Soccerbase

=== Discipline ===
| Pos | Nat | Player | FL2 | | FAC | | FLC | | FLT | | Total | | Pts |
| Pos | Nat | Player | Booked | Sent off (straight red) | Booked | Sent off (straight red) | Booked | Sent off (straight red) | Booked | Sent off (straight red) | Booked | Sent off (straight red) | Pts |
|---|---|---|---|---|---|---|---|---|---|---|---|---|---|
| DF | (England) | Jamie Bates | 8 | 1 | 0 | 0 | 0 | 0 | 0 | 0 | 8 | 1 | 11 |
| FW | (England) | Robert Taylor | 4 | 1 | 1 | 0 | 1 | 0 | 0 | 0 | 6 | 1 | 9 |
| MF | (England) | Warren Aspinall | 7 | 0 | — | | — | | 1 | 0 | 8 | 0 | 8 |
| DF | (England) | Paul Watson | 7 | 0 | — | | — | | 0 | 0 | 7 | 0 | 7 |
| MF | (England) | Charlie Oatway | 6 | 0 | 0 | 0 | 0 | 0 | 0 | 0 | 6 | 0 | 6 |
| MF | (England) | Glenn Cockerill | 5 | 0 | 1 | 0 | — | | 0 | 0 | 6 | 0 | 6 |
| DF | (England) | Carl Hutchings | 5 | 0 | 1 | 0 | 0 | 0 | 0 | 0 | 6 | 0 | 6 |
| DF | (England) | Danny Cullip | 5 | 0 | — | | — | | — | | 5 | 0 | 5 |
| FW | (Canada) | Niall Thompson | 2 | 1 | — | | — | | — | | 2 | 1 | 5 |
| MF | (England) | David McGhee | 3 | 0 | 1 | 0 | 1 | 0 | 0 | 0 | 5 | 0 | 5 |
| DF | (Barbados) | Gus Hurdle | 1 | 0 | 1 | 0 | 2 | 0 | 0 | 0 | 4 | 0 | 4 |
| DF | (Scotland) | Graeme Hogg | 3 | 0 | — | | — | | — | | 3 | 0 | 3 |
| FW | (Scotland) | Malcolm McPherson | 3 | 0 | 0 | 0 | 0 | 0 | 0 | 0 | 3 | 0 | 3 |
| DF | (England) | Leon Townley | 3 | 0 | 0 | 0 | 0 | 0 | 0 | 0 | 3 | 0 | 3 |
| MF | (England) | Nigel Gleghorn | 2 | 0 | 0 | 0 | — | | 0 | 0 | 2 | 0 | 2 |
| FW | (England) | Andy Scott | 2 | 0 | 0 | 0 | — | | 0 | 0 | 2 | 0 | 2 |
| MF | (England) | Ryan Denys | 2 | 0 | 0 | 0 | 0 | 0 | 0 | 0 | 2 | 0 | 2 |
| FW | (England) | Kevin Rapley | 2 | 0 | 0 | 0 | 0 | 0 | 0 | 0 | 2 | 0 | 2 |
| MF | (England) | Paul Barrowcliff | 1 | 0 | 0 | 0 | 1 | 0 | 0 | 0 | 2 | 0 | 2 |
| MF | (Wales) | Steven Blaney | 1 | 0 | — | | — | | — | | 1 | 0 | 1 |
| DF | (Wales) | Gareth Hall | 1 | 0 | — | | — | | — | | 1 | 0 | 1 |
| FW | (England) | Marcus Bent | 1 | 0 | 0 | 0 | 0 | 0 | — | | 1 | 0 | 1 |
| DF | (England) | Ijah Anderson | 1 | 0 | 0 | 0 | 0 | 0 | 0 | 0 | 1 | 0 | 1 |
| FW | (England) | Derek Bryan | 1 | 0 | 0 | 0 | 0 | 0 | 0 | 0 | 1 | 0 | 1 |
| MF | (England) | Kevin Dennis | 1 | 0 | 0 | 0 | 0 | 0 | 0 | 0 | 1 | 0 | 1 |
| DF | (England) | Stuart Myall | 1 | 0 | 0 | 0 | 0 | 0 | 0 | 0 | 1 | 0 | 1 |
| MF | (England) | Scott Canham | 0 | 0 | 0 | 0 | 1 | 0 | 0 | 0 | 1 | 0 | 1 |
| Total | | | 78 | 3 | 5 | 0 | 6 | 0 | 1 | 0 | 90 | 3 | 99 |

- Players listed in italics left the club mid-season.
- Source: Soccerbase

=== International caps ===
| Pos | Nat | Player | Caps | Goals | Ref |
|---|---|---|---|---|---|
| FW | (Canada) | Niall Thompson | 1 | 0 | |

=== Management ===
| Name | Nat | From | To | Record All Comps | | | | | Record League | | | | |
| Name | Nat | From | To | P | W | D | L | W % | P | W | D | L | W % |
|---|---|---|---|---|---|---|---|---|---|---|---|---|---|
| Kevin Lock (caretaker) | (England) | 9 August 1997 | 12 August 1997 | 1 | 0 | 0 | 1 | 0.00 | 1 | 0 | 0 | 1 | 0.00 |
| Eddie May | (England) | 12 August 1997 | 5 November 1997 | 19 | 5 | 5 | 9 | 26.32 | 15 | 4 | 4 | 7 | 26.67 |
| Micky Adams | (England) | 5 November 1997 | 2 May 1998 | 33 | 7 | 15 | 11 | 21.21| | 30 | 7 | 13 | 10 | 23.33 |

=== Summary ===
| Games played | 53 (46 Second Division, 2 FA Cup, 4 League Cup, 1 Football League Trophy) |
| Games won | 12 (11 Second Division, 0 FA Cup, 1 League Cup, 0 Football League Trophy) |
| Games drawn | 20 (17 Second Division, 2 FA Cup, 1 League Cup, 0 Football League Trophy) |
| Games lost | 21 (18 Second Division, 0 FA Cup, 2 League Cup, 1 Football League Trophy) |
| Goals scored | 60 (50 Second Division, 2 FA Cup, 7 League Cup, 1 Football League Trophy) |
| Goals conceded | 84 (71 Second Division, 2 FA Cup, 9 League Cup, 2 Football League Trophy) |
| Clean sheets | 11 (10 Second Division, 1 FA Cup, 0 League Cup, 0 Football League Trophy) |
| Biggest league win | 3–0 versus Walsall, 18 October 1997 |
| Worst league defeat | 4–0 on three occasions |
| Most appearances | 49, Carl Hutchings (43 Second Division, 2 FA Cup, 4 League Cup, 0 Football League Trophy) |
| Top scorer (league) | 13, Robert Taylor |
| Top scorer (all competitions) | 18, Robert Taylor |

== Transfers & loans ==
Players transferred in
| Date | Pos. | Name | Previous club | Fee | Ref. |
|---|---|---|---|---|---|
| 1 August 1997 | MF | (England) Paul Barrowcliff | (England) Stevenage Borough | £60,000 | |
| 1 August 1997 | DF | (England) Graham Benstead | (England) Kingstonian | Free | |
| 1 August 1997 | MF | (England) Simon Spencer | (England) Tottenham Hotspur | Free | |
| 1 August 1997 | MF | (England) Simon Wormull | (England) Tottenham Hotspur | Free | |
| 22 August 1997 | MF | (England) Charlie Oatway | (England) Torquay United | £12,000 | |
| 29 August 1997 | FW | (England) Derek Bryan | (England) Hampton | £50,000 | |
| 1 September 1997 | FW | (England) Ricky Reina | (England) Dover Athletic | £50,000 | |
| 17 September 1997 | DF | (England) Leon Townley | (England) Tottenham Hotspur | £25,000 | |
| 7 November 1997 | MF | (England) Glenn Cockerill | (England) Fulham | Free | |
| 20 November 1997 | MF | (England) Warren Aspinall | (England) Carlisle United | £50,000 | |
| 21 November 1997 | FW | (England) Andy Scott | (England) Sheffield United | £75,000 | |
| 19 December 1997 | DF | (England) Paul Watson | (England) Fulham | £55,000 | |
| 23 January 1998 | DF | (Scotland) Graeme Hogg | (England) Notts County | £5,000 | |
| 18 February 1998 | DF | (England) Danny Cullip | (England) Fulham | £75,000 | |
| 27 February 1998 | FW | (Canada) Niall Thompson | (Belgium) Zultse VV | Non-contract | |
| 27 March 1998 | MF | (Wales) Steven Blaney | (England) West Ham United | Free | |
Players loaned in
| Date from | Pos. | Name | From | Date to | Ref. |
| 29 August 1997 | MF | (England) Michael Black | (England) Arsenal | 29 September 1997 | |
| 3 October 1997 | DF | (Wales) Gareth Hall | (England) Sunderland | 3 November 1997 | |
| 16 October 1997 | GK | (Republic of Ireland) Nick Colgan | (England) Chelsea | 4 November 1997 | |
| 17 November 1997 | MF | (England) Nigel Gleghorn | (England) Burnley | 24 January 1998 | |
| 12 December 1997 | DF | (England) Paul Watson | (England) Fulham | 18 December 1997 | |
| 21 January 1998 | GK | (England) Mike Pollitt | (England) Notts County | 21 February 1998 | |
| 28 March 1998 | GK | (England) David Nurse | (England) Millwall | End of season | |
Players transferred out
| Date | Pos. | Name | Subsequent club | Fee | Ref. |
| 1 August 1997 | MF | (England) Paul Smith | (England) Gillingham | £195,000 | |
| 7 August 1997 | FW | (England) Carl Asaba | (England) Reading | £800,000 | |
| 9 August 1997 | DF | (England) Barry Ashby | (England) Gillingham | £140,000 | |
| 22 August 1997 | DF | (England) Brian Statham | (England) Gillingham | £10,000 | |
| 8 January 1998 | FW | (England) Marcus Bent | (England) Crystal Palace | £300,000 | |
| 31 March 1998 | MF | (England) Richard Goddard | (England) Woking | £7,500 | |
Players loaned out
| Date from | Pos. | Name | To | Date to | Ref. |
| 3 October 1997 | GK | (England) Tamer Fernandes | (England) Peterborough United | 3 November 1997 | |
| 10 October 1997 | MF | (England) Paul Barrowcliff | (England) Stevenage Borough | 10 November 1997 | |
| 10 October 1997 | MF | (England) Richard Goddard | (England) Woking | 31 March 1998 | |
| 30 January 1998 | MF | (England) Ryan Denys | (England) Yeovil Town | 28 February 1998 | |
Players released
| Date | Pos. | Name | Subsequent club | Join date | Ref. |
| 1 January 1998 | DF | (England) Stuart Myall | (England) Hastings Town | 1998 | |
| January 1998 | GK | (England) Graham Benstead | (England) Basingstoke Town | January 1998 | |
| January 1998 | DF | (Barbados) Gus Hurdle | (England) Plymouth Argyle | 1998 | |
| January 1998 | FW | (England) Joe Omigie | (England) Welling United | 1998 | |
| January 1998 | MF | (England) Simon Spencer | (England) Yeovil Town | February 1998 | |
| 29 January 1998 | GK | (England) Tamer Fernandes | (England) Colchester United | 29 January 1998 | |
| 25 February 1998 | DF | (England) Lee Harvey | (England) Stevenage Borough | 28 February 1998 | |
| 25 March 1998 | MF | (England) Simon Wormull | (England) Brighton & Hove Albion | 25 March 1998 | |
| April 1998 | FW | (England) Ricky Reina | (England) Dover Athletic | August 1998 | |
| 30 June 1998 | MF | (England) Paul Barrowcliff | (England) Hendon | 1998 | |
| 30 June 1998 | MF | (Wales) Steven Blaney | (England) St Albans City | August 1998 | |
| 30 June 1998 | MF | (England) Scott Canham | (England) Leyton Orient | 10 August 1998 | |
| 30 June 1998 | MF | (England) Glenn Cockerill | Retired | | |
| 30 June 1998 | DF | (Scotland) Graeme Hogg | Retired | | |
| 30 June 1998 | FW | (Scotland) Malcolm McPherson | Retired | | |

== Kit ==
Supplier: Cobra Sports
Sponsor(s): Ericsson

| Home | Away |

Source: Brentford F.C.

== Awards ==
- Brentford Supporters' Player of the Year: Carl Hutchings
- Brentford Internet Supporters' Player of the Year: Carl Hutchings
- Brentford Programme's Star Man of the Year: Carl Hutchings
- Eric White Memorial Trophy: Glenn Cockerill
- Football League Second Division Manager of the Month: Micky Adams (March 1998)
