= Joe Omigie =

English footballer

Personal information
- Full name: Joseph Eghodalo Omigie
- Date of birth: 13 June 1972 (age 54)
- Place of birth: Hammersmith, England
- Height: 6 ft 2 in (1.88 m)
- Position: Forward

Senior career*
| Years | Team | Apps | (Gls) |
- Hounslow
- Abbey News
- Hawker Athletic
| 1994 | Watford | 0 | (0) |
| 1994 | Donna | | |
| 1994–1998 | Brentford | 25 | (1) |
| 1995 | → Woking (loan) | 6 | (0) |
| 1998–1999 | Welling United | 1 | (0) |
| 1999–2000 | Farnborough Town | 18 | (2) |
| 2003–2004 | Hounslow Borough | | |

International career
- Nigeria Schoolboys
- * Club domestic league appearances and goals

Joseph Eghodalo Omigie (born 13 June 1972) is an English retired professional footballer who played as a forward in the Football League for Brentford.

== Career ==
=== Early years ===
Born in Shepherd's Bush, London, Omigie began his senior career in non-League football with Hounslow, before dropping into Sunday league to play for Sportsmans Senior Sunday Football League clubs Abbey News and Hawker Athletic. While playing Sunday league, Omigie, Charlie Oatway and Alan Mills were invited for trials with Second Division club Cardiff City, but Oatway was the only one of the trio to win a contract. Omigie joined First Division club Watford on trial and played in the club's 1994 Herts Senior Cup final win, but failed to earn a contract, having given what he described as "a performance to forget". He moved to join non-League club Donna.

=== Brentford ===
Omigie got his chance at League football when he signed a three-month contract with Second Division club Brentford in August 1994. He failed to make a first team appearance during the 1994–95 season, but despite niggling injuries, he impressed enough in the reserves to be offered a new two-year contract. Following a spell on loan at Conference club Woking early in the 1995–96 season, Omigie made his Brentford debut on Boxing Day 1995, which came as a substitute for Dean Martin in a 1–0 defeat to Brighton & Hove Albion. With the struggling Bees finally looking safe in mid-table late in the 1995–96 season, Omigie made his first senior start for the club in a 0–0 draw versus Swansea City on 23 March 1996 and played the full 90 minutes. He made a total of 11 appearances without scoring during the 1995–96 season.

Omigie had to wait until 2 November 1996 to make his first appearance of the 1996–97 season for the table-topping Bees, replacing Carl Asaba after 62 minutes of a 2–0 defeat to Watford. He scored his first goal for the club in a 4–1 away victory over Plymouth Argyle on Boxing Day 1996. Omigie made semi-regular appearances through to the end of the season, but failed to appear in the Bees' unsuccessful playoff campaign. He finished the 1996–97 season with 15 appearances and one goal.

Omigie was transfer-listed during the 1997 off-season and made his only appearance of the 1997–98 season as a substitute for Ryan Denys late in a 0–0 draw with Chesterfield on 16 August 1997. He was released in January 1998, after negotiating a settlement on his contract. Omigie made 31 appearances and scored two goals during four years at Griffin Park, though he notably scored 34 goals for the reserve team and top-scored during the 1995–96 and 1996–97 Capital League seasons.

=== Non-League football ===
After his release from Brentford, Omigie dropped back into non-League football and played for Welling United, Farnborough Town and Hounslow Borough.

== International career ==
As a youth, Omigie represented the Nigeria Schoolboys team in a match against a President's XI.

== Personal life ==
Omigie attended Southbank University. He is of Nigerian descent.

== Career statistics ==
Appearances and goals by club, season and competition
| Club | Season | League | | | FA Cup | | League Cup | | Other | | Total | |
| Club | Season | Division | Apps | Goals | Apps | Goals | Apps | Goals | Apps | Goals | Apps | Goals |
|---|---|---|---|---|---|---|---|---|---|---|---|---|
| Watford | 1993–94 | First Division | 0 | 0 | — | | — | | 1 (Note: Appearance in Herts Senior Cup) | 0 | 1 | 0 |
| Brentford | 1995–96 | Second Division | 11 | 0 | 0 | 0 | 0 | 0 | 0 | 0 | 11 | 0 |
| Brentford | 1996–97 | Second Division | 13 | 1 | 3 | 0 | 0 | 0 | 3 (Note: Appearances in Football League Trophy) | 1 | 19 | 2 |
| Brentford | 1997–98 | Second Division | 1 | 0 | 0 | 0 | 0 | 0 | 0 | 0 | 1 | 0 |
| Brentford | Total | | 25 | 1 | 3 | 0 | 0 | 0 | 3 | 1 | 31 | 2 |
| Farnborough Town | 1999–00 | Isthmian League Premier Division | 18 | 2 | — | | — | | 1 (Note: Appearance in Isthmian League Cup) | 0 | 19 | 2 |
| Career total | | | 43 | 3 | 3 | 0 | 0 | 0 | 5 | 1 | 50 | 4 |

== Honours ==
Watford Reserves

- Herts Senior Cup: 1993–94
