= 1996–97 Brentford F.C. season =

English football team season

Brentford
1996–97 season
- Chairman: Martin Lange
- Manager: David Webb
- Stadium: Griffin Park
- Second Division: 4th
- Play-offs: Runners-up
- FA Cup: Third round
- League Cup: Second round
- Football League Trophy: Quarter-final
- Top goalscorer: League: Asaba (23); All: Asaba (24)
- Highest home attendance: 12,019
- Lowest home attendance: 1,455
- Average home league attendance: 5,920
Home colours	Away colours

During the 1996–97 English football season, Brentford competed in the Football League Second Division. Despite having led the division for most of the season, a collapse in the final 13 matches dropped the Bees into the playoffs, where they were defeated by Crewe Alexandra in the 1997 Second Division playoff Final.

== Season summary ==
Despite a hangover in the 1995–96 season, Brentford entered 1996–97 with largely the same core of players which reached the 1995 Second Division playoff semi-finals. That said, central defender Barry Ashby and midfielders Paul Smith and Carl Hutchings all rejected new contracts in favour of monthly agreements, but the trio signed new deals during the opening two months of the season. Manager David Webb's only significant signing of the 1996 off-season was that of midfielder Scott Canham, paying West Ham United a £25,000 fee to turn his loan from the previous season into a permanent deal.

Brentford began the Second Division season with an 11-match unbeaten run and firmly held on to top spot in the table. The four-pronged attack of Carl Asaba, Nicky Forster, Robert Taylor and Marcus Bent proved fruitful and Asaba's 7-minute hat-trick versus Shrewsbury Town on 31 August 1996 was the quickest ever in a league match by a Brentford player. One win in eight matches from mid-October through to mid-November dropped the Bees back into the playoff positions, but the club returned to the summit early in the following 13-match unbeaten run. Forward Nicky Forster, who was in the final year of his contract, was sold to Birmingham City for a £700,000 fee on 31 January 1997, but he was not replaced.

Despite the loss of Forster, the unbeaten run continued until defeat away to Preston North End on 8 March. In the aftermath of the match, manager David Webb tendered his resignation, citing verbal abuse of himself, the coaching staff and the players and "undisclosed sensitive issues" as the reason. Chairman Martin Lange refused to accept Webb's resignation. The fallout from the Preston match gave way to a run of eight defeats in the final 13 matches of the season, in which just six goals were scored and the team failed to find the net at all during the final four matches. Things went from bad to worse when central defender Barry Ashby suffered an injury on 19 April and Carl Asaba was sent off in the penultimate match of the season. The run dropped Brentford from 1st to 4th place and into a two-legged tie with Bristol City in the playoff semi-finals.

Brentford rallied in the playoff semi-finals, seeing off Bristol City (who had finished the regular season with five consecutive wins) 4–2 on aggregate, winning 2–1 home and away. The Bees were "exposed and outclassed" in the final at Wembley Stadium versus Crewe Alexandra, losing 1–0 in a match which saw the Railwaymen hit the woodwork on three occasions and have two goalbound efforts cleared off the line by Carl Hutchings. In addition, Bees defender Brian Statham was sent off for committing a second bookable offence 15 minutes from time.

== League table ==
Pos	Team	Pld	W	D	L	GF	GA	GD	Pts	Promotion or relegation
2	Stockport County (P)	46	23	13	10	59	41	+18	82	Promotion to the First Division
3	Luton Town	46	21	15	10	71	45	+26	78	Qualification for the Second Division play-offs
4	Brentford	46	20	14	12	56	43	+13	74	Qualification for the Second Division play-offs
5	Bristol City	46	21	10	15	69	51	+18	73	Qualification for the Second Division play-offs
6	Crewe Alexandra (O, P)	46	22	7	17	56	47	+9	73	Qualification for the Second Division play-offs

Rules for classification: In the Football League goals scored (GF) takes precedence over goal difference (GD).
(O) Play-off winners; (P) Promoted

== Results ==
Brentford's goal tally listed first.

=== Legend ===
Win	Draw	Loss

=== Pre-season and friendlies ===
Date	Opponent	Venue	Result	Attendance	Scorer(s)
22 July 1996	Hampton	A	3–0	n/a	Asaba (pen), Taylor (pen), Forster
25 July 1996	Carshalton Athletic	A	1–0	n/a	Omigie
27 July 1996	Chertsey Town	A	1–0	n/a	Taylor
29 July 1996	Southend United	H	3–0	n/a	Bent, Forster, Asaba
31 July 1996	Tottenham Hotspur	H	0–3	3,175	
2 August 1996	Queens Park Rangers	H	2–1	3,793	Taylor (pen), Abrahams
5 August 1996	Stevenage Borough	A	2–2	n/a	Dennis, Asaba
7 August 1996	Derby County	H	0–2	1,936	
12 August 1996	Hayes	A	7–0	n/a	Dennis (2), Taylor, Forster, Bent, Myall, untraced (og)
14 February 1997	Southampton	H	2–0	n/a	Asaba (2)

=== Football League Second Division ===
No.	Date	Opponent	Venue	Result	Attendance	Scorer(s)
1	17 August 1996	Bury	A	1–1	3,373	Taylor
2	24 August 1996	Luton Town	H	3–2	5,404	Asaba, Bates, Taylor
3	27 August 1996	Gillingham	H	2–0	5,384	Abrahams (2)
4	31 August 1996	Shrewsbury Town	A	3–0	3,530	Asaba (3)
5	7 September 1996	Chesterfield	A	2–0	3,643	Bates, Forster
6	10 September 1996	Plymouth Argyle	H	3–2	5,377	Smith, Asaba, Bent
7	14 September 1996	Blackpool	H	1–1	5,908	Asaba
8	21 September 1996	Wycombe Wanderers	A	1–0	5,330	Bent
9	28 September 1996	York City	H	3–3	5,243	Taylor, Asaba (2)
10	1 October 1996	Bristol City	A	2–1	9,520	Asaba, Forster
11	5 October 1996	Rotherham United	H	4–2	6,137	Asaba (2), Taylor, Forster
12	12 October 1996	Crewe Alexandra	A	0–2	4,313	
13	15 October 1996	Peterborough United	A	1–0	5,037	Taylor
14	19 October 1996	Walsall	H	1–1	5,419	Hutchings
15	26 October 1996	Millwall	H	0–0	7,691	
16	29 October 1996	Bristol Rovers	A	1–2	5,163	Hutchings
17	2 November 1996	Watford	A	0–2	11,448	
18	9 November 1996	Stockport County	H	2–2	5,076	Canham, Forster
19	19 November 1996	Bournemouth	A	1–2	3,464	Anderson
20	23 November 1996	Wrexham	H	2–0	4,885	Forster, Asaba
21	29 November 1996	Millwall	A	0–0	7,845	
22	3 December 1996	Notts County	H	2–0	3,675	Bent, Asaba
23	14 December 1996	Burnley	A	2–1	10,575	Asaba, Forster
24	21 December 1996	Preston North End	H	0–0	5,365	
25	26 December 1996	Plymouth Argyle	A	4–1	9,525	Forster (2), Asaba, Omigie
26	11 January 1997	York City	A	4–2	3,085	Asaba (2), Forster (2)
27	18 January 1997	Bristol City	H	0–0	7,606	
28	21 January 1997	Bristol Rovers	H	0–0	4,191	
29	1 February 1997	Stockport County	A	2–1	8,650	McGhee, Taylor
30	8 February 1997	Watford	H	1–1	8,679	Asaba
31	22 February 1997	Bournemouth	H	1–0	6,071	Asaba
32	1 March 1997	Notts County	A	1–1	4,323	Ashby
33	4 March 1997	Wycombe Wanderers	H	0–0	5,375	
34	8 March 1997	Preston North End	A	0–1	9,489	
35	15 March 1997	Burnley	H	0–3	6,624	
36	21 March 1997	Luton Town	A	0–1	8,164	
37	25 March 1997	Wrexham	A	2–0	4,053	Asaba (2, 1 pen)
38	29 March 1997	Bury	H	0–2	7,823	
39	31 March 1997	Gillingham	A	2–1	7,361	Janney, Asaba
40	5 April 1997	Shrewsbury Town	H	0–0	5,355	
41	11 April 1997	Rotherham United	A	1–0	1,797	Taylor
42	15 April 1997	Chesterfield	H	1–0	5,216	Asaba
43	19 April 1997	Crewe Alexandra	H	0–2	6,183	
44	22 April 1997	Blackpool	A	0–1	4,030	
45	26 April 1997	Walsall	A	0–1	5,359	
46	3 May 1997	Peterborough United	H	0–1	5,274	

=== Football League Second Division play-offs ===
Round	Date	Opponent	Venue	Result	Attendance	Scorer(s)	Notes
SF (1st leg)	11 May 1997	Bristol City	A	2–1	15,581	Smith, Taylor	
SF (2nd leg)	14 May 1997	Bristol City	H	2–1 (won 4–2 on aggregate)	9,496	Taylor, Bent	
F	25 May 1997	Crewe Alexandra	N	0–1	34,149		(Note: Match played at Wembley Stadium, London.)

=== FA Cup ===
Round	Date	Opponent	Venue	Result	Attendance	Scorer(s)	Notes
R1	16 November 1996	Bournemouth	H	2–0	4,509	Smith, Forster	
R2	7 December 1996	Sudbury Town	A	3–1	3,973	McGhee, Taylor (2)	(Note: Match played at Layer Road, Colchester.)
R3	25 January 1997	Manchester City	H	0–1	12,019		

=== League Cup ===
Round	Date	Opponent	Venue	Result	Attendance	Scorer
R1 (1st leg)	20 August 1996	Plymouth Argyle	H	1–0	3,034	Taylor
R1 (2nd leg)	3 September 1996	Plymouth Argyle	A	0–0 (won 1–0 on aggregate)	5,180	
R2 (1st leg)	17 September 1996	Blackburn Rovers	H	1–2	8,938	Forster
R2 (2nd leg)	24 September 1996	Blackburn Rovers	A	0–2 (lost 4–1 on aggregate)	9,599	

=== Football League Trophy ===
Round	Date	Opponent	Venue	Result	Attendance	Scorer(s)
SR1	10 December 1996	Bristol Rovers	A	2–1	2,752	Omigie, Asaba
SR2	7 January 1997	Barnet	H	2–1 (a.e.t.)	1,455	Taylor, Forster
SQF	28 January 1997	Colchester United	H	0–1	2,253	

- Source: Statto, The Big Brentford Book of the Nineties

== Playing squad ==
Players' ages are as of the opening day of the 1996–97 season.

Position	Name	Nationality	Date of birth (age)	Signed from	Signed in	Notes
Goalkeepers
GK	Kevin Dearden	(England)	8 March 1970 (aged 26)	Tottenham Hotspur	1993	
GK	Tamer Fernandes	(England)	7 December 1974 (aged 21)	Youth	1993	
Defenders
DF	Ijah Anderson	(England)	30 December 1975 (aged 20)	Southend United	1995	
DF	Barry Ashby	(England)	21 November 1970 (aged 25)	Watford	1994	
DF	Jamie Bates (c)	(England)	24 February 1968 (aged 28)	Youth	1986	
DF	Carl Hutchings	(England)	24 September 1974 (aged 21)	Youth	1993	
DF	Brian Statham	(England)	21 May 1969 (aged 27)	Tottenham Hotspur	1992	
Midfielders
MF	Scott Canham	(England)	11 November 1974 (aged 21)	West Ham United	1996	
MF	Kevin Dennis	(England)	14 December 1976 (aged 19)	Arsenal	1996	
MF	Richard Goddard	(England)	31 March 1978 (aged 18)	Arsenal	1996	
MF	Lee Harvey	(England)	21 December 1966 (aged 29)	Nottingham Forest	1993	
MF	Gus Hurdle	(Barbados)	14 October 1973 (aged 22)	Carshalton Athletic	1993	
MF	David McGhee	(England)	19 June 1976 (aged 20)	Youth	1994	
MF	Paul Smith	(England)	18 September 1971 (aged 24)	Southend United	1993	
Forwards
FW	Carl Asaba	(England)	28 January 1973 (aged 23)	Dulwich Hamlet	1994	
FW	Marcus Bent	(England)	19 May 1978 (aged 18)	Youth	1995	
FW	Malcolm McPherson	(Scotland)	9 December 1974 (aged 21)	West Ham United	1996	
FW	Joe Omigie	(England)	13 June 1972 (aged 24)	Donna	1994	
FW	Kevin Rapley	(England)	21 September 1977 (aged 18)	Youth	1997	
FW	Robert Taylor	(England)	30 April 1971 (aged 25)	Leyton Orient	1994	
Players who left the club mid-season
MF	Paul Abrahams	(England)	31 October 1973 (aged 22)	Colchester United	1995	Transferred to Colchester United
MF	Mark Janney	(England)	2 December 1977 (aged 18)	Tottenham Hotspur	1997	Returned to Tottenham Hotspur after loan
FW	Nicky Forster	(England)	8 September 1973 (aged 22)	Gillingham	1994	Transferred to Birmingham City
FW	Steve Slade	(England)	6 October 1975 (aged 20)	Queens Park Rangers	1997	Returned to Queens Park Rangers after loan

- Source: Soccerbase

== Coaching staff ==
Name	Role
(England) David Webb	Manager
(England) Kevin Lock	First Team Coach
(England) Roy Johnson	Physiotherapist
(England) Fergus Dignan	Medical Officer

== Statistics ==
=== Appearances and goals ===
Substitute appearances in brackets.

Pos	Nat	Name	League		FA Cup		League Cup		FL Trophy		Playoffs		Total	
Pos	Nat	Name	Apps	Goals	Apps	Goals	Apps	Goals	Apps	Goals	Apps	Goals	Apps	Goals
GK	(England)	Kevin Dearden	44	0	3	0	4	0	2	0	3	0	56	0
GK	(England)	Tamer Fernandes	2	0	0	0	0	0	1	0	0	0	3	0
DF	(England)	Ijah Anderson	46	1	2	0	4	0	1	0	3	0	56	1
DF	(England)	Barry Ashby	40	1	3	0	4	0	3	0	0 (1)	0	50 (1)	1
DF	(England)	Jamie Bates	37	2	3	0	4	0	3	0	3	0	50	2
DF	(Barbados)	Gus Hurdle	28 (3)	0	2	0	4	0	1	0	3	0	38 (3)	0
DF	(England)	Brian Statham	11 (8)	0	1	0	0	0	2	0	3	0	17 (8)	0
MF	(England)	Paul Abrahams	5 (3)	2	—		1 (2)	0	—		—		6 (5)	2
MF	(England)	Marcus Bent	29 (5)	3	2	0	4	0	1 (1)	0	3	1	39 (6)	4
MF	(England)	Scott Canham	13	1	1	0	2	0	0	0	0 (2)	0	16 (2)	1
MF	(England)	Kevin Dennis	9 (3)	0	0	0	0	0	2	0	1	0	12 (3)	0
MF	(England)	Richard Goddard	0 (1)	0	0	0	0	0	0	0	0	0	0 (1)	0
MF	(England)	Lee Harvey	2 (12)	0	0 (2)	0	0 (2)	0	1	0	0	0	3 (16)	0
MF	(England)	Carl Hutchings	23 (5)	2	1	0	0 (1)	0	1	0	3	0	28 (6)	2
MF	(England)	David McGhee	44 (1)	1	3	1	2 (1)	0	3	0	3	0	55 (2)	2
MF	(England)	Paul Smith	46	1	3	1	4	0	2	0	3	1	58	3
FW	(England)	Carl Asaba	44	23	3	0	4	0	3	1	2	0	56	24
FW	(England)	Nicky Forster	25	10	3	1	3	1	1	1	—		32	13
FW	(Scotland)	Malcolm McPherson	2 (1)	0	0	0	0	0	1 (1)	0	0	0	3 (2)	0
FW	(England)	Joe Omigie	7 (6)	1	0 (3)	0	0	0	2 (1)	1	0	0	9 (10)	2
FW	(England)	Kevin Rapley	1 (1)	0	0	0	0	0	0	0	0	0	1 (1)	0
FW	(England)	Robert Taylor	43	7	3	2	4	1	3	1	3	2	56	13
Players loaned in during the season
MF	(England)	Mark Janney	1 (1)	1	—		—		—		—		1 (1)	1
MF	(England)	Steve Slade	4	0	—		—		—		—		4	0

- Players listed in italics left the club mid-season.
- Source: The Big Brentford Book of the Nineties

=== Goalscorers ===
Pos.	Nat	Player	FL2	FAC	FLC	FLT	FLP	Total
FW	(England)	Carl Asaba	23	0	0	1	0	24
FW	(England)	Nicky Forster	10	1	1	1	—	13
FW	(England)	Robert Taylor	7	2	1	1	2	13
MF	(England)	Marcus Bent	3	0	0	0	1	4
MF	(England)	Paul Smith	1	1	0	0	1	3
MF	(England)	Paul Abrahams	2	—	0	—	—	2
DF	(England)	Jamie Bates	2	0	0	0	0	2
MF	(England)	Carl Hutchings	2	0	0	0	0	2
MF	(England)	David McGhee	1	1	0	0	0	2
FW	(England)	Joe Omigie	1	0	0	1	0	2
MF	(England)	Mark Janney	1	—	—	—	—	1
DF	(England)	Ijah Anderson	1	0	0	0	0	1
DF	(England)	Barry Ashby	1	0	0	0	0	1
MF	(England)	Scott Canham	1	0	0	0	0	1
Total			56	5	2	4	4	71

- Players listed in italics left the club mid-season.
- Source: The Big Brentford Book of the Nineties

=== Discipline ===
Pos	Nat	Player	FL2		FAC		FLC		FLT		FLP		Total		Pts
Pos	Nat	Player	Booked	Sent off (straight red)	Booked	Sent off (straight red)	Booked	Sent off (straight red)	Booked	Sent off (straight red)	Booked	Sent off (straight red)	Booked	Sent off (straight red)	Pts
FW	(England)	Carl Asaba	6	0	0	0	2	0	0	0	1	1	9	1	12
DF	(England)	Barry Ashby	4	0	0	0	2	0	0	0	0	0	6	2	12
DF	(England)	Ijah Anderson	7	0	0	0	1	0	0	0	0	0	8	0	8
DF	(Barbados)	Gus Hurdle	6	0	0	0	1	0	0	0	0	0	7	0	7
DF	(England)	Brian Statham	2	0	0	0	0	0	0	0	1	1	3	1	6
FW	(England)	Nicky Forster	4	0	1	0	0	0	0	0	—		5	0	5
DF	(England)	Jamie Bates	3	0	0	0	1	0	0	0	0	0	4	0	4
MF	(England)	Marcus Bent	3	0	0	0	0	0	0	0	0	0	3	0	3
MF	(England)	Paul Smith	3	0	0	0	0	0	0	0	0	0	3	0	3
MF	(England)	Steve Slade	2	0	—		—		—		—		2	0	2
MF	(England)	Kevin Dennis	2	0	0	0	0	0	0	0	0	0	2	0	2
MF	(England)	Carl Hutchings	2	0	0	0	0	0	0	0	0	0	2	0	2
MF	(England)	Scott Canham	1	0	1	0	0	0	0	0	0	0	2	0	2
GK	(England)	Kevin Dearden	1	0	0	0	0	0	0	0	0	0	1	0	1
FW	(England)	Robert Taylor	1	0	0	0	0	0	0	0	0	0	1	0	1
Total			47	0	2	0	7	0	0	0	2	2	58	2	64

- Players listed in italics left the club mid-season.
- Source: Soccerbase

=== Management ===
Name	Nat	From	To	Record All Comps					Record League				
Name	Nat	From	To	P	W	D	L	W %	P	W	D	L	W %
David Webb	(England)	17 August 1996	25 May 1997	59	27	15	17	45.76	46	20	14	12	43.48

=== Summary ===
Games played	59 (46 Second Division, 3 FA Cup, 4 League Cup, 3 Football League Trophy, 3 Football League playoffs)
Games won	27 (20 Second Division, 2 FA Cup, 1 League Cup, 2 Football League Trophy, 2 Football League playoffs)
Games drawn	15 (14 Second Division, 0 FA Cup, 1 League Cup, 0 Football League Trophy, 0 Football League playoffs)
Games lost	17 (12 Second Division, 1 FA Cup, 2 League Cup, 1 Football League Trophy, 1 Football League playoffs)
Goals scored	71 (56 Second Division, 5 FA Cup, 2 League Cup, 4 Football League Trophy, 4 Football League playoffs)
Goals conceded	55 (43 Second Division, 2 FA Cup, 4 League Cup, 3 Football League Trophy, 3 Football League playoffs)
Clean sheets	21 (18 Second Division, 1 FA Cup, 2 League Cup, 0 Football League Trophy, 0 Football League playoffs)
Biggest league win	3–0 versus Shrewsbury Town, 31 August 1996; 4–1 versus Plymouth Argyle, 26 December 1996
Worst league defeat	3–0 versus Burnley, 15 March 1997
Most appearances	58, Paul Smith (46 Second Division, 3 FA Cup, 4 League Cup, 2 Football League Trophy, 3 Football League playoffs)
Top scorer (league)	23, Carl Asaba
Top scorer (all competitions)	24, Carl Asaba

== Transfers & loans ==
Players transferred in
Date	Pos.	Name	Previous club	Fee	Ref.
July 1996	MF	(England) Kevin Dennis	(England) Arsenal	Free	
July 1996	MF	(England) Richard Goddard	(England) Arsenal	Free	
July 1996	FW	(Scotland) Malcolm McPherson	(England) West Ham United	Free	
July 1996	MF	(England) Stuart Myall	(England) Brighton & Hove Albion	Free	
August 1996	MF	(England) Scott Canham	(England) West Ham United	£25,000	
Players loaned in
Date from	Pos.	Name	From	Date to	Ref.
13 February 1997	FW	(England) Steve Slade	(England) Queens Park Rangers	8 March 1997	
15 March 1997	FW	(England) Paul Mahorn	(England) Tottenham Hotspur	March 1997	
27 March 1997	MF	(England) Mark Janney	(England) Tottenham Hotspur	5 April 1997	
Players transferred out
Date	Pos.	Name	Subsequent club	Fee	Ref.
23 October 1996	MF	(England) Paul Abrahams	(England) Colchester United	£20,000	
31 January 1997	FW	(England) Nicky Forster	(England) Birmingham City	£700,000	
Players loaned out
Date from	Pos.	Name	To	Date to	Ref.
December 1996	MF	(England) Stuart Myall	(England) Hastings Town	January 1997	

== Kit ==
Supplier: Cobra Sports
Sponsor(s): Ericsson

Home	Away	Goalkeeper

Source: Brentford F.C.

== Awards ==
- Supporters' Player of the Year: Barry Ashby
- Star Player of the Year: Barry Ashby
- London Evening Standard Player of the Month: Jamie Bates (December 1996)
- Ericsson Player of the Month: Kevin Dennis (April 1997)
- Football League Second Division Manager of the Month: David Webb (August 1996)
