= Derek Bryan (footballer) =

English footballer (born 1974)

Personal information
- Full name: Derek Kirk Bryan
- Date of birth: 11 November 1974 (age 52)
- Place of birth: Hammersmith, England
- Height: 5 ft 10 in (1.78 m)
- Position: Forward

Senior career*
Years	Team	Apps	(Gls)
–1996	Bedfont Green	0	(0)
1996–1997	Hampton	0	(0)
1997–2002	Brentford	55	(9)
2002	Gravesend & Northfleet	1	(0)
2002	Welling United	9	(1)
2002	Walton & Hersham	0	(0)
2002–2003	Hampton & Richmond Borough	0	(0)
- * Club domestic league appearances and goals

Derek Kirk Bryan (born 11 November 1974) is an English retired footballer, best remembered for his five-season spell in the Football League with Brentford. Described as having "lightning pace and an eye for goal", his career was effectively ended by knee injuries suffered in January 2000.

== Playing career ==
=== Early years ===
Bryan grew up in Hammersmith, London and began his career at Combined Counties League Premier Division club Bedfont Green. He joined Isthmian League Second Division club Hampton on 1 August 1996.

=== Brentford ===
Bryan signed for Second Division club Brentford on 29 August 1997 in a £50,000 deal. He made his debut for the club in a 0–0 league draw at Plymouth Argyle on 13 September, replacing Ryan Denys after 81 minutes. He made his first start in a 2–2 away draw with Bristol City on 3 March 1998 and capped his day by scoring the opening goal just before half time. Niggling injuries saw Bryan make just 11 appearances during the 1997–98 season, scoring two goals and Brentford suffered relegation to the Third Division on the final day.

Bryan had to wait until November for his first appearance of the 1998–99 season, coming on as a 56th-minute substitute for Drewe Broughton in a 2–0 defeat at Shrewsbury Town. He made 24 appearances during the 1998–99 season, scoring four goals as Brentford were promoted straight back to the Second Division as champions. Bryan made regular appearances throughout the first half of the 1999–00 season, until disaster struck in a Football League Trophy quarter-final tie at home to Oxford United on 25 January 2000. Bryan scored the opening goal of the 2–0 win, but in the process he damaged the medial and cruciate ligaments in both knees. The injury meant that he missed the rest of the 1999–00 season and the entire 2000–01 season.

Bryan made his comeback from the injuries after 77 minutes of a 2–1 league victory over Peterborough United on 13 October 2001, when he came on as a substitute for Ben Burgess. It turned out to be Bryan's final appearance for the club and he was released in March 2002. During 3 1/2 seasons at Griffin Park, Bryan made 64 appearances and scored 10 goals.

=== Gravesend & Northfleet ===
Bryan signed for Isthmian League Premier Division high-fliers Gravesend & Northfleet on 11 March 2002. He made his debut for the club on the same day in a 2–0 defeat to Purfleet and made little impact before being substituted for Che Stadhart half time. It was Bryan's only appearance for the club and he and departed a matter of weeks later.

=== Welling United ===
Bryan joined Southern League Premier Division club Welling United in late March 2002. Bryan made 9 appearances and scored one goal during what remained of the 2001–02 season and left the club at the end of the campaign.

=== Walton & Hersham ===
On 8 November 2002 Bryan signed for Isthmian League First Division South club Walton & Hersham and made an appearance in a 0–0 FA Trophy draw with Chesham United on 2 December.

=== Return to Hampton & Richmond Borough ===
Bryan signed for former club Hampton & Richmond Borough (then members of the Isthmian League Premier Division) on 3 December 2002. He made his debut in a 6–0 Isthmian League Cup defeat to Lewes on 11 December.

== Career statistics ==
Appearances and goals by club, season and competition
Club	Season	League			FA Cup		League Cup		Other		Total	
Club	Season	Division	Apps	Goals	Apps	Goals	Apps	Goals	Apps	Goals	Apps	Goals
Brentford	1997–98	Second Division	11	2	0	0	0	0	0	0	11	2
Brentford	1998–99	Third Division	20	4	2	0	0	0	2 (Note: Appearances in Football League Trophy)	0	24	4
Brentford	1999–2000	Second Division	18	1	1	0	2	0	1	1	22	2
Brentford	2001–02	Second Division	1	0	0	0	0	0	0	0	1	0
Brentford	Total		50	7	3	0	2	0	3	1	58	7
Welling United	2001–02	Southern League Premier Division	9	1	—		—		—		9	1
Career total			59	8	3	0	2	0	3	1	67	8

== Honours ==
Brentford

- Football League Third Division: 1998–99
