= Stuart Myall =

English footballer (born 1974)

Personal information
- Full name: Stuart Thomas Myall
- Date of birth: 12 November 1974 (age 51)
- Place of birth: Eastbourne, England
- Height: 1.78 m (5 ft 10 in)
- Positions: Midfielder; defender

Youth career
- 1986–1993: Tottenham Hotspur

Senior career*
| Years | Team | Apps | (Gls) |
| 1993–1996 | Brighton & Hove Albion | 80 | (4) |
| 1996–1998 | Brentford | 2 | (0) |
| 1996–1997 | → Hastings Town (loan) | | |
| 1998–2004 | Hastings United | 31 | (7) |
| 2004–2005 | Eastbourne Borough | 17 | (0) |
| 2005–2006 | Folkestone Invicta | 55 | (3) |
| 2006–2008 | Horsham | 62 | (1) |
| 2012–2013 | Eastbourne United Association | 2 | (0) |
- * Club domestic league appearances and goals

Stuart Thomas Myall (born 12 November 1974) is an English former professional footballer who played as a defender and midfielder. He began his career in the Football League with Brighton & Hove Albion and later had a brief spell at Brentford, before dropping into non-League football. After retiring from professional football, Myall transitioned into teaching and coaching, and as of 2022, he was managing Eastbourne Town Veterans, leading them to multiple Sussex Veterans Challenge Cup victories.

== Early life ==
Myall was born and grew up in Eastbourne, East Sussex. He served as head boy at Cavendish School in the town.

== Playing career ==
=== Brighton & Hove Albion ===
Myall joined Brighton & Hove Albion's Centre of Excellence at the age of 11. He progressed to the first team as a full back, but faced challenges with injury and weight issues, leading to him being transfer-listed by manager Liam Brady in September 1994. Under manager Jimmy Case, Myall improved his fitness and excelled in a midfield anchor role during the 1995–96 season, earning a reputation as a neat passer. He made 93 appearances and scored four goals before his release at the end of the 1995–96 season, following the club's relegation. Reflecting in 2002, Myall stated he had a "great time at Brighton" but was disappointed with his release.

=== Brentford ===
Myall signed a two-year contract with Second Division side Brentford on a free transfer in the 1996 off-season. He did not feature in the first team during the 1996–97 season under manager David Webb, instead playing for the reserves where he scored six goals in 20 appearances. Under new manager Eddie May, Myall made his debut on 1 November 1997 in a 0–0 draw against AFC Bournemouth. After May's departure and the appointment of Micky Adams, Myall did not play further and left in January 1998 after settling his contract.

=== Hastings United ===
Myall joined Southern League Premier Division club Hastings Town (later renamed Hastings United) before the 1998–99 season, having previously been on loan there during the 1996–97 season. The club resigned from the Southern League in 1999 but was reinstated to the First Division East for the 1999–2000 season. Myall won his first silverware during the 2001–02 season, helping Hastings secure the Southern League First Division East title. He endured an injury-plagued 2002–03 season, during which the club was relegated. Myall made 17 appearances and scored three goals that season. He departed in February 2004 after 19 appearances and four goals in the 2003–04 season, having made over 250 appearances overall for the club.

=== Eastbourne Borough ===
Myall moved to Southern League Premier Division club Eastbourne Borough in February 2004, making eight appearances in the remainder of the 2003–04 season. Despite finishing 11th, the club was promoted to the newly formed Conference South for the 2004–05 season. Myall made nine appearances before leaving in February 2005.

=== Folkestone Invicta ===
Myall joined Isthmian League Premier Division side Folkestone Invicta on 12 February 2005, making nine appearances and scoring one goal in the rest of the 2004–05 season. He was nearly ever-present in the 2005–06 season, with 41 appearances and three goals. Myall left after six appearances in the early 2006–07 season, totalling 56 appearances and four goals.

=== Horsham ===
Myall signed for Isthmian League Premier Division club Horsham in September 2006, making 31 appearances and scoring one goal in the 2006–07 season. He departed at the end of the 2007–08 season after 33 appearances, totalling 64 appearances and one goal.

=== Eastbourne United Association ===
Myall joined Sussex County League Second Division club Eastbourne United Association in December 2012.

=== Later career ===
While living in Malaysia, Myall played for Kuala Lumpur Expat & Veterans League club KL International. In Hong Kong, he played for veterans' club Discovery Bay, winning the Legal League title in the 2014–15 season.

== Coaching and managerial career ==
In the late 1990s and early 2000s, Myall coached children in the United States, in Atlanta and Chicago. He co-founded Eastbourne Town Veterans with former teammate Danny Simmonds around 2015. As manager, he led the team to victories in the Sussex Veterans Challenge Cup, including the 2022 final where they retained the title.

== Personal life ==
Myall supported Liverpool as a child. In the early 2000s, he worked in office jobs, including as a computer retail salesman in London. Inspired to become a PE teacher, he enrolled at University of Brighton in 2002 and graduated with a PE degree in 2005. He served as Head of Department at a state school in Lambeth before emigrating to Kuala Lumpur. Myall then became Head of Secondary Physical Education at Discovery Bay International School in Hong Kong from 2013 to 2015. In 2015, he returned to Eastbourne to take up a role as Head of Section and teacher of sport at Gildredge House Free School.

== Career statistics ==
Appearances and goals by club, season and competition
| Club | Season | League | | | FA Cup | | League Cup | | Other | | Total | |
| Club | Season | Division | Apps | Goals | Apps | Goals | Apps | Goals | Apps | Goals | Apps | Goals |
|---|---|---|---|---|---|---|---|---|---|---|---|---|
| Brighton & Hove Albion | 1992–93 | Second Division | 1 | 0 | 0 | 0 | 0 | 0 | 0 | 0 | 1 | 0 |
| Brighton & Hove Albion | 1993–94 | Second Division | 16 | 0 | 2 | 0 | 2 | 0 | 1 | 0 | 21 | 0 |
| Brighton & Hove Albion | 1994–95 | Third Division | 30 | 2 | 1 | 0 | 2 | 0 | 1 | 0 | 34 | 2 |
| Brighton & Hove Albion | 1995–96 | Third Division | 33 | 2 | 1 | 0 | 0 | 0 | 2 | 0 | 36 | 2 |
| Brighton & Hove Albion | Total | | 80 | 4 | 4 | 0 | 4 | 0 | 4 | 0 | 92 | 4 |
| Brentford | 1997–98 | Second Division | 2 | 0 | 0 | 0 | 0 | 0 | 0 | 0 | 2 | 0 |
| Hastings United | 2002–03 | Southern League Premier Division | 13 | 3 | 0 | 0 | — | | 0 | 0 | 13 | 3 |
| Hastings United | 2003–04 | Southern League First Division East | 18 | 4 | 0 | 0 | — | | 0 | 0 | 18 | 4 |
| Hastings United | Total | | 31 | 7 | 0 | 0 | — | | 0 | 0 | 31 | 7 |
| Eastbourne Borough | 2003–04 | Southern League Premier Division | 8 | 0 | 0 | 0 | — | | 0 | 0 | 8 | 0 |
| Eastbourne Borough | 2004–05 | Conference South | 9 | 0 | 0 | 0 | — | | 0 | 0 | 9 | 0 |
| Eastbourne Borough | Total | | 17 | 0 | 0 | 0 | — | | 0 | 0 | 17 | 0 |
| Folkestone Invicta | 2004–05 | Isthmian League Premier Division | 9 | 1 | 0 | 0 | — | | 0 | 0 | 9 | 1 |
| Folkestone Invicta | 2005–06 | Isthmian League Premier Division | 39 | 3 | 1 | 0 | — | | 1 (Note: Appearance in Isthmian League Cup) | 0 | 41 | 3 |
| Folkestone Invicta | 2006–07 | Isthmian League Premier Division | 6 | 0 | 0 | 0 | — | | 0 | 0 | 6 | 0 |
| Folkestone Invicta | Total | | 54 | 4 | 1 | 0 | — | | 1 | 0 | 56 | 4 |
| Horsham | 2006–07 | Isthmian League Premier Division | 29 | 1 | 1 | 0 | — | | 1 (Note: Appearance in Isthmian League Cup) | 0 | 31 | 1 |
| Horsham | 2007–08 | Isthmian League Premier Division | 27 | 0 | 3 | 0 | — | | 3 (Note: Appearances in Isthmian League Cup) | 0 | 33 | 0 |
| Horsham | Total | | 56 | 1 | 4 | 0 | — | | 4 | 0 | 64 | 1 |
| Eastbourne United Association | 2012–13 | Sussex County League Second Division | 2 | 0 | 0 | 0 | — | | 0 | 0 | 2 | 0 |
| Career total | | | 242 | 16 | 9 | 0 | 4 | 0 | 9 | 0 | 264 | 16 |

Source: Soccerbase and other archived sources. Note: Statistics for Hastings United (1998–2002), Hastings Town loan, and some cup appearances are incomplete due to limited records.

== Honours ==
=== Player ===
Hastings United

- Southern League First Division East: 2001–02

Discovery Bay

- Hong Kong Legal League: 2014–15

=== Manager ===
Eastbourne Town Veterans

- Sussex Veterans Challenge Cup: 2019, 2022
