= Ryan Denys =

English footballer and coach (born 1978)

Personal information
- Full name: Ryan Hayden Denys
- Date of birth: 16 August 1978 (age 48)
- Place of birth: Brentford, England
- Height: 5 ft 6 in (1.68 m)
- Positions: Midfielder; forward

Youth career
- Stour Boys Club
- Ealing Whistlers
- Constantine
- –1997: Brentford

Senior career*
| Years | Team | Apps | (Gls) |
| 1997–1999 | Brentford | 19 | (1) |
| 1998 | → Yeovil Town (loan) | 5 | (1) |
| 1999 | → Carshalton Athletic (loan) | | |
| 1999– | Hampton & Richmond Borough | | |
| 2002–2004 | Actual Soccer | 26 | (10) |
| 2005–2008 | Sandridge Rovers | 26 | (5) |
| 2008–2011 | Harpenden Rovers | | |
| 2011–2012 | Harpenden Town | 4 | (3) |
| 2013–2014 | Sandridge Rovers | 8 | (1) |
- * Club domestic league appearances and goals

Ryan Hayden Denys (born 16 August 1978) is an English retired semi-professional footballer who played as a forward or midfielder. He began his career in the Football League with Brentford, before dropping into non-League football in 1999. After his retirement, Denys moved into coaching.

== Playing career ==
=== Youth years ===
Denys began his career in West London youth football with Stour Boys Club, Ealing Whistlers and Constantine, before entering the youth system at hometown club Brentford.

=== Brentford ===
Denys signed his first professional contract at the end of the 1996–97 season. He made his debut on the opening day of the 1997–98 Second Division season in a 3–0 loss at Millwall, as a half-time substitute for Simon Spencer. He made his first start in following game against Shrewsbury Town in the League Cup first round and scored his first senior goal for the club in a 1–1 draw. He held down a regular starting place from August through to October 1997. After Micky Adams replaced Eddie May as manager in November 1997, Denys fell behind Glenn Cockerill, Leon Townley and David McGhee in the midfield pecking order. His final appearance of the season came on 13 January 1998, in a 2–2 Football League Trophy second round defeat to Luton Town. Denys joined Conference club Yeovil Town on a one-month loan on 30 January 1998 and made five appearances, scoring one goal. He made 24 Brentford appearances during the 1997–98 season, scoring two goals.

Under new manager Ron Noades, Denys was not called into the first team squad during the 1998–99 season and in February 1999, he joined Isthmian League Premier Division strugglers Carshalton Athletic until the end of the 1998–99 season. He was released in June 1999.

=== Non-League football ===
Following his release from Brentford, Bryan had a 15-year career in non-League football and played in the Isthmian League, Middlesex County League, Hertfordshire Senior County League and the Spartan South Midlands League for Hampton & Richmond Borough, Actual Soccer, Sandridge Rovers, Harpenden Rovers and Harpenden Town. During the 2007–08 season, Denys was named in the Hertfordshire Senior County League representative team, which would compete in the FA National League System Cup for the right to represent England in the UEFA Regions Cup. The Herts Senior County League team lost to the eventual runners up Midland Combination in the second round.

=== Sunday League ===
While at Harpenden Town, Denys joined West Acton Rovers in the West Fulham Sunday League Premier Division at the start of the 2012–13 season. He scored the opener in the 2013 Alf Dear Cup final victory over AFC Wandsworth and helped Rovers to the Premier Division title. He later played for West Middlesex Sunday League Vets Division team British Airways Sunday Vets between 2015 and 2017.

== Career statistics ==
Appearances and goals by club, season and competition
| Club | Season | League | | | FA Cup | | League Cup | | Other | | Total | |
| Club | Season | Division | Apps | Goals | Apps | Goals | Apps | Goals | Apps | Goals | Apps | Goals |
|---|---|---|---|---|---|---|---|---|---|---|---|---|
| Brentford | 1997–98 | Second Division | 19 | 1 | 0 | 0 | 4 | 1 | 0 | 0 | 23 | 2 |
| Yeovil Town (loan) | 1997–98 | Conference | 5 | 1 | — | | — | | 0 | 0 | 5 | 1 |
| Actual Soccer | 2002–03 | Middlesex County League First Division | 16 | 2 | — | | — | | 5 (Note: 2 appearances in The President's First Division Cup, 2 appearances in Jerry Ward Senior Supplementary Cup, 1 appearance in Middlesex Federation League Cup) | 0 | 21 | 2 |
| Actual Soccer | 2003–04 | Middlesex County League First Division | 10 | 8 | — | | — | | 3 (Note: 3 appearances and 3 goals in Middlesex Federation League Cup) | 3 | 13 | 11 |
| Actual Soccer | Total | | 16 | 10 | — | | — | | 8 | 3 | 34 | 13 |
| Sandridge Rovers | 2005–06 | Hertfordshire Senior County League Premier Division | 27 | 5 | — | | — | | 5 (Note: 3 appearances and 2 goals in Capital Counties Feeder Leagues Trophy, 2 appearances in Aubrey Cup, 1 appearance and 1 goal in Herts Centenary Senior Trophy) | 3 | 32 | 8 |
| Sandridge Rovers | 2013–14 | Hertfordshire Senior County League Premier Division | 8 | 1 | 0 | 0 | — | | 1 (Note: Appearance in Hertfordshire Senior Centenary Trophy) | 1 | 9 | 2 |
| Career total | | | 75 | 18 | 0 | 0 | 4 | 1 | 13 | 7 | 103 | 26 |

== Honours ==
West Acton Rovers

- West Fulham Sunday League Premier Division: 2012–13
- Alf Dear Cup: 2012–13

Individual

- Brentford Youth Team Player of the Year: 1996–97
