= Steven Blaney (footballer) =

English footballer

Personal information
- Full name: Steven David Blaney
- Date of birth: 24 March 1977 (age 49)
- Place of birth: Orsett, England
- Height: 1.83 m (6 ft 0 in)
- Position: Defender

Youth career
- 1996–1997: West Ham United

Senior career*
Years	Team	Apps	(Gls)
1997–1998	West Ham United	0	(0)
1998	Brentford	5	(0)
1998–1999	St Albans City	0	(0)
1999–2001	Billericay Town		
1999	→ Heybridge Swifts (loan)		
2000	→ Grays Athletic (loan)		
2001	St Albans City	16	(4)
2001	Aveley		
2001	→ St Albans City (loan)	3	(1)
2001–2002	Braintree Town	7	(0)
2002–2003	Harlow Town		
2003–2004	East Thurrock United		
2004–2005	Nerja		
2005–2006	Barking & East Ham United	38	(4)
2006	Redbridge	2	(0)

International career
1992	England Schoolboys	5	(0)
1996	Wales U21	3	(0)
- * Club domestic league appearances and goals

Steven David Blaney (born 24 March 1977) is a retired professional footballer who played as a defender. He began his career in the academy at Premier League club West Ham United and made his professional debut whilst with Brentford in 1998. Upon his release from West Ham United, Blaney embarked on a career in non-League football and as of 2014, was a tutor and coach at Harlow College. Born in England, he represented Wales U21 at international level.

== Career ==
=== West Ham United ===
Blaney was discovered by Frank Lampard while playing for his district team and entered the academy at West Ham United. Blaney began his career as a right back and signed a professional contract in July 1995, but he left the Hammers in March 1998, having failed to win a call into a first team squad.

=== Brentford ===
On 27 March 1998, Blaney joined relegation-threatened Second Division club Brentford on a contract until the end of the 1997–98 season. In what remained of the season, he made five appearances and left the club when his contract expired.

=== Non-League football ===
Between 1998 and 2006, Blaney played in the Isthmian and Southern Leagues for St Albans City (three spells), Billericay Town, Heybridge Swifts, Grays Athletic, Aveley, Braintree Town, Harlow Town, East Thurrock United, Barking & East Ham United and Redbridge. He moved to Spain to play for Regional Preferente de Málaga club Nerja during the 2004–05 season.

== International career ==
Blaney won five caps for England Schoolboys at international level and was a member of the 1991–92 Victory Shield-winning squad. In 1996, he changed his national allegiance to Wales and won three caps for the U21 team.

== Coaching career ==
Blaney is a UEFA B licence holder. As of 2014, he was a football coach and a Senior Tutor in Sport at Harlow College. Together with former Cambridge United trainee Matt Waldron, Blaney coached the Harlow College Academy team to the Essex County Council League title in the 2010–11 season. As of 2014, Blaney was a coach at a Player Development Centre in Harlow for Norwich City and was an academy coach and scout for West Ham United. He has also been on the staff for the Pathways Plus Academy and Eurotech Soccer Camps.

== Personal life ==
Blaney has a Sports Coaching/Education degree.

== Career statistics ==
Appearances and goals by club, season and competition
Club	Season	League			FA Cup		Other		Total	
Club	Season	Division	Apps	Goals	Apps	Goals	Apps	Goals	Apps	Goals
Brentford	1997–98	Second Division	5	0	—		—		5	0
St Albans City	1998–99	Isthmian League Premier Division	0	0	—		1 (Note: Appearance in Herts Charity Cup)	1	1	1
St Albans City	2000–01	Isthmian League Premier Division	16	4	—		1 (Note: Appearance in FA Trophy)	0	17	4
Braintree Town	2001–02	Isthmian League Premier Division	7	0	—		—		7	0
St Albans City (loan)	2001–02	Isthmian League Premier Division	3	1	1	0	—		4	1
St Albans City (loan)	Total		19	5	1	0	2	1	22	6
Redbridge	2006–07	Isthmian League First Division North	2	0	2	0	1 (Note: Appearance in Isthmian League Cup)	0	5	0
Career total			33	5	3	0	3	1	39	6

== Honours ==
England Schoolboys

- Victory Shield: 1991–92
