= Paul Barrowcliff =

English footballer and physiotherapist

Personal information
- Full name: Paul Joseph Barrowcliff
- Date of birth: 15 June 1969 (age 57)
- Place of birth: Hillingdon, England
- Height: 1.70 m (5 ft 7 in)
- Position: Midfielder

Team information
- Current team: Metropolitan Police (physiotherapist)

Senior career*
Years	Team	Apps	(Gls)
1988–1989	Ruislip Manor		
1989–1990	Hayes	21	(3)
1990	→ Chalfont St Peter (loan)		
1990	Harrow Borough		
1990–1991	St Albans City	21	(3)
1991	Woking		
1991–1992	Kingstonian		
1992–1993	Wycombe Wanderers	2	(0)
1993–1994	Sutton United		
1994–1995	Aylesbury United	19	(0)
1995–1997	Stevenage Borough	77	(11)
1997–1998	Brentford	12	(0)
1997	→ Stevenage Borough (loan)	5	(0)
1998	Hendon	0	(0)
1998	Chesham United		
1999–2003	Slough Town	139	(4)
2003	Metropolitan Police		
2003–2004	Slough Town	24	(0)
2004–2009	Metropolitan Police	46	(1)
Total		367	(22)
- * Club domestic league appearances and goals

Paul Joseph Barrowcliff (born 15 June 1969) is an English retired semi-professional footballer who played as midfielder. He had a long career in non-League football and played one season in the Football League for Brentford. He is currently the physiotherapist at Metropolitan Police.

== Playing career ==
=== Beginnings in non-League football (1988–1997) ===
Barrowcliff got into football through attending the Boys' Brigade and scouts as a youth. He began his senior career at Isthmian League Second Division South club Ruislip Manor in 1988 and moved up a level to sign for Premier Division club Hayes in February 1989. While at Hayes, Barrowcliff featured on loan for Isthmian League First Division club Chalfont St Peter in January 1990. He moved across the Isthmian League Premier Division to sign for Harrow Borough in March 1990. He departed early in the 1990–91 season to move Isthmian Premier Division club St Albans City and left to join divisional rivals Woking in February 1990.

Barrowcliff moved to Isthmian League Premier Division club Kingstonian in 1991 and played at Conference level for the first time when he signed for Wycombe Wanderers in 1992. Barrowcliff made just six appearances and left after the 1992–93 season to join Isthmian League Premier Division club Sutton United. Barrowcliff signed for Isthmian League Premier Division club Aylesbury United during the 1994–95 season and made 19 appearances before leaving at the end of the campaign.

Barrowcliff joined newly-promoted Conference club Stevenage Borough during the 1995 off-season. He was a vital part of the team which won the 1995–96 Conference title, making 50 appearances and scoring eight goals, but the club was not promoted to the Football League due to its Broadhall Way ground not meeting Football League requirements. Barrowcliff was named the club's 1995–96 Supporters' Player Of The Year award and also captained the team. He stayed with Stevenage for the 1996–97 season and left the club in August 1997.

=== Brentford ===
On 1 August 1997, Barrowcliff moved up to the Football League when he transferred to Second Division club Brentford for a £60,000 fee. He started Brentford's first six games in all competitions and returned to former club Stevenage Borough on a one-month loan in October 1997. He made five appearances during his spell and following his return to Brentford, he made substitute cameos and occasional starts, before injury ended his season in December. Barrowcliff was transfer-listed in February 1998 and his contract was cancelled by mutual consent after Brentford's final-day relegation to the Third Division. He made 16 appearances during the 1997–98 season.

=== Return to non-League football (1998–2009) ===
Following his release from Brentford, Barrowcliff joined Isthmian League Premier Division club Hendon during the 1998 off-season. He failed to make an appearance and moved across the division to sign for Chesham United later in the year.

Barrowcliff transferred to Isthmian League Premier Division club Slough Town in January 1999. During what remained of the 1998–99 season, Barrowcliff made 18 appearances and scored three goals. He made 31 appearances during the 1999–00 season and scored one goal. After a period out of the team during the early months of the 2000–01 season, Barrowcliff was a virtual ever-present from November 2000 onwards and finished the season with 32 appearances. His performances were a rare highlight of a season which saw Slough suffer relegation.

Playing at Isthmian League First Division level for the first time since 1990, Barrowcliff was again a virtual ever-present for Slough Town during the 2001–02 season and made 46 appearances, scoring two goals. Barrowcliff played 39 matches during the 2002–03 season before departing to join Isthmian League First Division South club Metropolitan Police in February 2003.

Barrowcliff returned to Slough Town (now playing in the Isthmian League First Division South) in September 2003 and had a successful 2003–04 season with the club. He made 27 appearances and helped Slough to a fourth-place finish, which saw the Rebels secure promotion back to the Isthmian League Premier Division. During his two spells at Slough Town, Barrowcliff made 193 appearances and scored six goals.

Barrowcliff returned to Metropolitan Police during the 2004 off-season. He made just 10 appearances during the 2004–05 season, but he captained the club during the 2005–06 season. Barrowcliff made 13 appearances during the 2006–07 season, but failed to make an appearance during the 2007–08 and 2008–09 seasons and retired in 2009. After his retirement, he became the club's physiotherapist. He represented the club's Veterans team in the 2012–13 Isthmian Veterans' Cup and played in the final, which was lost 2–1 to Northwood Vets.

== Personal life ==
Barrowcliff worked as a personal trainer and as of October 2012, was working for the Metropolitan Police.

== Career statistics ==
Appearances and goals by club, season and competition
Club	Season	League			FA Cup		League Cup		Other		Total	
Club	Season	Division	Apps	Goals	Apps	Goals	Apps	Goals	Apps	Goals	Apps	Goals
St Albans City	1990–91	Isthmian League Premier Division	21	3	0	0	—		3 (Note: 1 appearance in Isthmian League Cup, 1 appearance in Isthmian League Full Members Cup, 1 appearance in Herts Senior Cup)	0	24	3
Aylesbury United	1994–95	Isthmian League Premier Division	19	0	—		—		—		19	0
Stevenage Borough	1995–96	Conference	40	6	6	2	—		4 (Note: Appearances in FA Trophy)	0	50	8
Stevenage Borough	1996–97	Conference	39	4	8	0	—		9 (Note: 7 appearances in FA Trophy, 1 appearance in Herts Charity Cup, 1 appearance in Jim Thompson Championship Match)	0	56	4
Stevenage Borough	Total		79	10	14	2	—		13	0	106	12
Brentford	1997–98	Second Division	11	0	2	0	3	0	0	0	16	0
Stevenage Borough (loan)	1997–98	Conference	5	0	—		—		—		5	0
Stevenage Borough (loan)	Total		84	10	14	2	—		13	0	111	12
Slough Town	1998–99	Isthmian League Premier Division	17	2	—		—		1	0	18	2
Slough Town	1999–00	Isthmian League Premier Division	24	1	3	0	—		4 (Note: 2 appearances in Isthmian League Full Members Cup, 1 appearance in FA Trophy, 1 appearance in Berks & Bucks Senior Cup)	0	31	1
Slough Town	2000–01	Isthmian League Premier Division	28	0	0	0	—		4 (Note: 2 appearances in FA Trophy, 2 appearances and 1 goal in Isthmian League Full Members Cup)	1	32	1
Slough Town	2001–02	Isthmian League First Division	42	1	1	0	—		5 (Note: 3 appearances and 1 goal in Berks & Bucks Senior Cup, 1 appearance in FA Trophy, 1 appearance in Isthmian League Cup)	1	48	2
Slough Town	2002–03	Isthmian League First Division North	28	0	7	0	—		4 (Note: 2 appearances in FA Trophy, 1 appearance in Isthmian League Cup, 1 appearance in Berks & Bucks Senior Cup)	0	39	0
Slough Town	Total		139	4	11	0	—		18	2	168	6
Slough Town	2003–04	Isthmian League First Division South	24	0	1	0	—		2 (Note: 1 appearance in FA Trophy, 1 appearance in Berks & Bucks Senior Cup)	0	27	0
Slough Town	Total		163	4	12	0	—		20	2	195	6
Metropolitan Police	2004–05	Isthmian League First Division	10	0	0	0	—		0	0	10	0
Metropolitan Police	2005–06	Isthmian League First Division	25	1	0	0	—		0	0	25	1
Metropolitan Police	2006–07	Isthmian League First Division South	11	0	0	0	—		2 (Note: Appearances in Isthmian League Cup)	0	13	0
Metropolitan Police	Total		46	1	0	0	—		2	0	48	1
Career total			344	18	26	2	3	0	38	2	411	22

== Honours ==
Stevenage Borough

- Football Conference: 1995–96
- Herts Charity Cup: 1995–96

Slough Town

- Isthmian League First Division South: 2003–04

Individual

- Stevenage Borough Supporters' Player of the Year: 1996–97
