= Simon Spencer =

English footballer (born 1976)

Personal information
- Full name: Simon Dean Spencer
- Date of birth: 10 September 1976 (age 50)
- Place of birth: Islington, England
- Height: 1.75 m (5 ft 9 in)
- Position: Midfielder

Youth career
- –1995: Tottenham Hotspur

Senior career*
Years	Team	Apps	(Gls)
1995–1997	Tottenham Hotspur	0	(0)
1997–1998	Brentford	1	(0)
1998	Yeovil Town	1	(0)
- Egham Town
- Billericay Town

International career
1992	England U16		
1994	England U18	2	(0)
- * Club domestic league appearances and goals

Simon Dean Spencer (born 10 September 1976) is an English former professional footballer who played as a midfielder. He began his career at Tottenham Hotspur and later moved to Brentford, where he made one appearance in the Football League. He was capped by England at U16 and U18 level.

== Playing career ==
=== Tottenham Hotspur ===
Spencer began his career in the academy at Premier League club Tottenham Hotspur and progressed to make three senior appearances for the club, all during the 1995 UEFA Intertoto Cup campaign. He departed White Hart Lane at the end of the 1996–97 season.

=== Brentford ===
Spencer was offered a three-month trial at Second Division club Brentford during the 1997–98 pre-season and signed a one-year contract on 1 August 1997. He made his debut in a 3–0 opening day defeat to Millwall and was substituted for Ryan Denys at half time by caretaker manager Kevin Lock. He completed his first 90 minutes for the club in the following game, a League Cup first round shootout win over Shrewsbury Town. It proved to be his final appearance for the club and he failed to feature in a first team squad again. Spencer departed Griffin Park in January 1998, after negotiating a settlement on his contract.

=== Non-League football ===
After his release from Brentford, Spencer dropped into non-League football and played for Conference club Yeovil Town and Isthmian League clubs Egham Town and Billericay Town.

== International career ==
Spencer was capped by England at U16 and U18 level.

== Career statistics ==
Appearances and goals by club, season and competition
Club	Season	League			FA Cup		League Cup		Europe		Other		Total	
Club	Season	Division	Apps	Goals	Apps	Goals	Apps	Goals	Apps	Goals	Apps	Goals	Apps	Goals
Tottenham Hotspur	1995–96	Premier League	0	0	0	0	0	0	3 (Note: Appearances in Intertoto Cup)	0	—		3	0
Brentford	1997–98	Second Division	1	0	0	0	1	0	—		0	0	2	0
Yeovil Town	1997–98	Conference	1	0	—		—		—		—		1	0
Career total			2	0	0	0	1	0	3	0	0	0	6	0
