= Ricky Reina =

English footballer

Personal information
- Full name: Enrique Iglesia Reina
- Date of birth: 2 October 1971 (age 55)
- Place of birth: Folkestone, England
- Height: 1.83 m (6 ft 0 in)
- Position: Forward

Senior career*
| Years | Team | Apps | (Gls) |
| 1991–1995 | Folkestone Invicta | | |
| 1995–1996 | Sing Tao | | |
| 1996–1997 | Dover Athletic | 33 | (9) |
| 1997–1998 | Brentford | 6 | (1) |
| 1998–1999 | Dover Athletic | 26 | (4) |
| 2000–2001 | Ramsgate | | |
| 2001–2002 | Folkestone Invicta | 21 | (1) |
- * Club domestic league appearances and goals

Enrique Iglesia Reina (born Folkestone, 2 October 1971) is an English former professional footballer who played as a forward in the Football League for Brentford.

== Football career ==
Reina began his career with non-League club Folkestone Invicta, before moving to Dover Athletic and then to Brentford in September 1997, for a £50,000 fee. He made 9 appearances for the Second Division club, but was forced to retire from professional football due to a knee injury in April 1998. Reina returned to Dover Athletic for the 1998–99 season and later played for Ramsgate and Folkestone Invicta, before retiring at the end of the 2001–02 season.

== Rowing ==
Reina has been active in endurance rowing. In February 2016, he and partner John Wilson set heavyweight world records in the age 40–49 category in Tandem Longest Continual Row and Tandem Million Meters. In February 2019, the pair completed an 89-day row between Spain and Antigua.

== Personal life ==
In 2003, Reina set up Reina Group, a Folkestone-based heating and plumbing services company.

== Honours ==
- Folkestone Invicta Supporters' Player of the Year: 1992–93

== Career statistics ==
Appearances and goals by club, season and competition
| Club | Season | League | | | FA Cup | | League Cup | | Other | | Total | |
| Club | Season | Division | Apps | Goals | Apps | Goals | Apps | Goals | Apps | Goals | Apps | Goals |
|---|---|---|---|---|---|---|---|---|---|---|---|---|
| Brentford | 1997–98 | Second Division | 6 | 1 | 2 | 0 | 1 | 0 | 0 | 0 | 9 | 1 |
| Folkestone Invicta | 2001–02 | Southern League Premier Division | 21 | 1 | 0 | 0 | — | | 0 | 0 | 21 | 1 |
| Career total | | | 27 | 2 | 2 | 0 | 1 | 0 | 0 | 0 | 30 | 2 |
