= Kevin Dennis =

English footballer (born 1976)

Personal information
- Full name: Kevin Jason Dennis
- Date of birth: 14 December 1976 (age 49)
- Place of birth: Islington, England
- Height: 1.78 m (5 ft 10 in)
- Position: Left winger

Youth career
- –1996: Arsenal

Senior career*
Years	Team	Apps	(Gls)
1996–1998	Brentford	17	(0)
1998	→ Chesham United (loan)		
1999	→ Welling United (loan)		
1999	Hampton & Richmond Borough		
1999	Welling United	18	(2)
- * Club domestic league appearances and goals

Kevin Jason Dennis (born 14 December 1976) is an English retired professional footballer who played as a left winger for Football League club Brentford.

== Career ==
=== Brentford ===
Dennis began his career in the academy at Premier League club Arsenal, before being released and signing a three-month contract with Second Division club Brentford during the 1996 off-season. He made the first senior appearance of his career as a 75th-minute substitute for Carl Asaba in a 2–0 defeat to Crewe Alexandra on 12 October 1996. Dennis broke into the team during the latter part of the 1996–97 season and made one appearance in the Bees' unsuccessful play-off campaign. He made just six appearances during 1997–98 and after the club's relegation to the Third Division at the end of the season, he signed a new one-year contract. Dennis was an unused substitute on one occasion during the 1998–99 season and was released in May 1999. Dennis made 21 appearances and scored no goals during three seasons at Griffin Park.

=== Non-League football ===
During the 1998–99 season, Dennis spent time on loan from Brentford at non-League clubs Chesham United and Welling United. In 1999, he briefly joined Isthmian League Premier Division club Hampton & Richmond Borough on a free transfer and then returned to Conference club Welling United, for whom he played until December 1999.

== Personal life ==
In February 1994, Dennis was convicted of manslaughter together with his brother, after the duo stabbed 20-year-old Simon Geary to death in the Highbury neighbourhood. In 2001, he was found guilty of the 1999 murder of 23-year-old Batatunde Oba in a fight at an Ealing nightspot. The conviction was later overturned on appeal.

== Career statistics ==
Appearances and goals by club, season and competition
Club	Season	League			FA Cup		League Cup		Other		Total	
Club	Season	Division	Apps	Goals	Apps	Goals	Apps	Goals	Apps	Goals	Apps	Goals
Brentford	1996–97	Second Division	12	0	0	0	0	0	3 (Note: 2 appearances in Football League Trophy, 1 appearance in Second Division play-offs)	0	15	0
Brentford	1997–98	Second Division	5	0	0	0	0	0	1 (Note: Appearances in Football League Trophy)	0	6	0
Brentford	1998–99	Third Division	0	0	—		0	0	0	0	0	0
Brentford	Total		17	0	0	0	0	0	4	0	21	0
Welling United	1999–00	Conference	18	2	1	0	—		1 (Note: Appearance in Conference League Cup)	0	20	2
Career total			35	2	1	0	0	0	5	0	41	2
