= Richard Goddard-Crawley =

English footballer

Personal information
- Full name: Richard Lewis Goddard-Crawley
- Date of birth: 31 March 1978 (age 48)
- Place of birth: Burnt Oak, England
- Height: 6 ft 4 in (1.93 m)
- Positions: Midfielder; central defender

Youth career
- 1994–1996: Arsenal

Senior career*
Years	Team	Apps	(Gls)
1996–1998	Brentford	1	(0)
1997–1998	→ Woking (loan)		
1998–2000	Woking	13	(0)
2000–2001	St Albans City	37	(1)
2001–2002	Chesham United	24	(3)
2002–2004	Harrow Borough	67	(12)
2004–2006	Thurrock	57	(3)
2006–2007	Yeading	25	(2)
2007–2008	AFC Hornchurch	33	(1)
- * Club domestic league appearances and goals

Richard Goddard-Crawley (born 31 March 1978) is an English retired semi-professional footballer who played as a midfielder in the Football League for Brentford. After his release in 1998, he had a 10-year career in non-League football.

== Career ==
=== Brentford ===
After beginning his youth career in the academy at Premier League club Arsenal in 1994, Goddard-Crawley joined Second Division club Brentford on trial in May 1996 and signed a two-year contract three months later. He was an unused substitute on three occasions, before making his senior debut in the final match of the 1996–97 regular season, as a 78th-minute substitute for Robert Taylor in a 1–0 defeat to Peterborough United.

Goddard-Crawley made two League Cup appearances early in the 1997–98 season, before moving away on loan in October 1997 and returning with a fractured foot one month later. Goddard-Crawley departed Brentford for the final time in March 1998, after making three appearances in just under two years at Griffin Park. He played the majority of his football at the club for the reserve team, for whom he made 36 appearances and scored two goals.

=== Non-League football ===
In March 1998, Goddard-Crawley returned to Conference club Woking for a £7,500 fee, after having been on loan at the Kingfield Stadium earlier in the 1997–98 season. Over the next decade he subsequently played in the Conference and Isthmian League for St Albans City, Chesham United, Harrow Borough, Thurrock, Yeading and AFC Hornchurch, before retiring in 2008.

== Post-retirement ==
After retiring from football, Goddard-Crawley returned to Arsenal as an academy physiotherapist in October 2008. As of February 2020, he was running a physiotherapy business in North London.

== Career statistics ==
Appearances and goals by club, season and competition
Club	Season	League			FA Cup		League Cup		Other		Total	
Club	Season	Division	Apps	Goals	Apps	Goals	Apps	Goals	Apps	Goals	Apps	Goals
Brentford	1996–97	Second Division	1	0	0	0	0	0	0	0	1	0
Brentford	1997–98	Second Division	0	0	0	0	2	0	0	0	2	0
Brentford	Total		1	0	0	0	2	0	0	0	3	0
Woking	1998–99	Conference	1	0	0	0	—		0	0	1	0
Woking	1999–00	Conference	12	0	0	0	—		3 (Note: 2 appearances in Conference League Cup, 1 appearance in FA Trophy)	0	15	0
Woking	Total		13	0	0	0	—		3	0	16	0
St Albans City	1999–00	Isthmian League Premier Division	6	0	—		—		1 (Note: Appearance in Herts Senior Cup)	0	7	0
St Albans City	2000–01	Isthmian League Premier Division	27	1	2	0	—		10 (Note: 4 appearances and 1 goal in Isthmian League Cup, 3 appearances in FA Trophy, 2 appearances in Isthmian League Full Members Cup, 1 appearance in Herts Charity Cup)	1	39	2
St Albans City	2001–02	Isthmian League Premier Division	4	0	—		—		1 (Note: Appearance in Herts Charity Cup)	0	5	0
St Albans City	Total		37	1	2	0	—		12	1	51	2
Chesham United	2001–02	Isthmian League Premier Division	24	3	0	0	—		0	0	24	3
Harrow Borough	2002–03	Isthmian League Premier Division	30	6	0	0	—		0	0	30	6
Harrow Borough	2003–04	Isthmian League Premier Division	37	6	0	0	—		1 (Note: Appearance in Isthmian League play-offs)	0	38	6
Harrow Borough	Total		67	12	0	0	—		1	0	68	12
Thurrock	2004–05	Conference South	25	1	1	0	—		1 (Note: Appearance in Conference play-offs)	0	27	1
Thurrock	2005–06	Conference South	32	2	0	0	—		0	0	32	2
Thurrock	Total		57	3	1	0	—		1	0	59	3
Yeading	2006–07	Conference South	25	2	1	0	—		2 (Note: Appearances in FA Trophy)	0	28	2
AFC Hornchurch	2007–08	Isthmian League Premier Division	30	1	0	0	—		2 (Note: Appearances in Isthmian League Cup)	0	32	1
AFC Hornchurch	2008–09	Isthmian League Premier Division	3	0	0	0	—		0	0	3	0
AFC Hornchurch	Total		33	1	0	0	—		2	0	35	1
Career total			257	22	4	0	2	0	21	1	284	23

== Honours ==
St Albans City

- Herts Senior Cup: 1999–00

Individual

- Yeading Supporters' Player of the Year: 2006–07
- Yeading Supporters' Player of the Year: 2006–07
