= Carl Hutchings =

English footballer (born 1974)

Personal information
- Full name: Carl Emil Hutchings
- Date of birth: 24 September 1974 (age 52)
- Place of birth: Hammersmith, England
- Height: 5 ft 11 in (1.80 m)
- Position: Utility player

Youth career
- –1989: Chelsea
- 1989–1993: Brentford

Senior career*
Years	Team	Apps	(Gls)
1993–1998	Brentford	162	(7)
1998–2000	Bristol City	43	(3)
2000	→ Brentford (loan)	8	(0)
2000	→ Exeter City (loan)	2	(0)
2000–2002	Southend United	43	(4)
2002–2003	Leyton Orient	38	(2)
2003–2004	Farnborough Town	20	(0)
Total		315	(16)
- * Club domestic league appearances and goals

Carl Emil Hutchings (born 24 September 1974) is an English retired professional footballer who played as a utility player. He is best remembered for his five years in the Football League with Brentford, for whom he made over 200 appearances. He also played league football for Bristol City, Southend United and Exeter City. Hutchings was described as an "intelligent footballer", who performed "with infectious exuberance".

== Career ==
=== Brentford ===
Hutchings began his youth career at Chelsea, before signing schoolboy forms with Brentford in 1989. He began an apprenticeship in 1991 and signed a professional contract at the end of the 1992–93 season. He instantly became a regular pick under new manager David Webb and after weathering some early criticism, he went on to become a valuable utility player for the team, filling in over the course of five seasons at full back, centre back and in central midfield. Hutchings was a part of the team that reached the 1995 Second Division play-off semi-finals, but his 1995–96 season was hampered by torn ankle ligaments, suffered in a behind closed doors match in August 1995. After managing 29 appearances, he was offered a new contract at the end of the season, but rejected it in favour of a month-to-month deal.

Despite being a regular pick early in the 1996–97 season, Hutchings trained with Southend United in September 1996, before agreeing a new two-year Brentford contract one month later. Hutchings was part of the team which reached the 1997 Second Division play-off final and was "the star man" in the disappointing 1–0 defeat. Playing in a poor team, Hutchings had the best season of his career in 1997–98, making 49 appearances and scoring five goals to be voted the club's Supporters' Player of the Year, but the campaign ended with relegation to the Third Division. Out of contract and refusing to discuss an extension, Hutchings departed Brentford in July 1998 and finished his career at Griffin Park with 198 appearances and seven goals.

=== Bristol City ===
On 6 July 1998, Hutchings transferred to First Division club Bristol City for a £135,000 fee. He failed to fully establish himself in the team and on 11 February 2000, Hutchings returned to Brentford on loan until the end of the 1999–00 season. He made 8 appearances during his spell, but was not offered a contract at the end of the season. By the beginning of the 2000–01 season, Hutchings was out of favour with Bristol City manager Danny Wilson. On 1 December 2000, Hutchings joined Third Division club Exeter City on loan, but lasted just 10 days at St James Park, making three appearances. One month earlier, he had turned down a permanent move to the club. Hutchings departed Bristol City in December 2000, after making 52 appearances and scoring five goals during 2 1/2 seasons at Ashton Gate.

=== Southend United ===
Hutchings reunited with his former Brentford manager David Webb at Third Division club Southend United on 29 December 2000. He signed a contract running until the end of the 2000–01 season and made 15 appearances without scoring. During the 2001 off-season, Hutchings turned down a three-year contract with Third Division club Kidderminster Harriers and after a move to Second Division club Queens Park Rangers collapsed, he agreed a short-term contract extension with Southend United. Hutchings departed Roots Hall in February 2002, after making 50 appearances and scoring five goals.

=== Leyton Orient ===
On 12 February 2002, Hutchings joined Third Division club Leyton Orient on a free transfer. One week later, had a "nightmare" debut at Brisbane Road, when he "fatally sold his goalkeeper short with a backpass", which allowed York City's Alex Mathie to score what proved to be an 84th-minute winner. Hutchings remained with Orient until April 2003, when he was released early from his contract. He made 40 appearances and scored two goals for the club.

=== Farnborough Town ===
Hutchings joined Conference club Farnborough Town on 30 July 2003. He made 22 appearances for the club, the last of which coming in a 2–1 defeat to Exeter City on 3 January 2004.

== Personal life ==
Since retiring from football at the age of 29, Hutchings has become a successful stock market trader, entrepreneur and motivational speaker. He started a property company whilst still a professional footballer, with Bristol City. Hutchings is also involved in sports management.

== Career statistics ==
Appearances and goals by club, season and competition
Club	Season	League			FA Cup		League Cup		Other		Total	
Club	Season	Division	Apps	Goals	Apps	Goals	Apps	Goals	Apps	Goals	Apps	Goals
Brentford	1993–94	Second Division	29	0	2	0	2	0	4 (Note: Appearances in Football League Trophy)	0	37	0
Brentford	1994–95	Second Division	39	0	2	0	4	0	4 (Note: 3 appearances in Football League Trophy, 1 appearance in Second Division play-offs)	0	49	0
Brentford	1995–96	Second Division	23	0	5	0	0	0	1	0	29	0
Brentford	1996–97	Second Division	28	2	1	0	1	0	4 (Note: 3 appearances in Second Division play-offs, 1 appearance in Football League Trophy)	0	34	2
Brentford	1997–98	Second Division	43	5	2	0	4	0	0	0	49	5
Brentford	Total		162	7	12	0	11	0	13	0	198	7
Bristol City	1998–99	First Division	21	2	1	0	3	1	—		25	3
Bristol City	1999–00	Second Division	22	1	3	0	2	1	0	0	27	2
Bristol City	2000–01	Second Division	0	0	—		0	0	—		0	0
Bristol City	Total		43	3	4	0	5	2	0	0	52	5
Brentford (loan)	1999–00	Second Division	8	0	—		—		—		8	0
Brentford (loan)	Total		170	7	12	0	11	0	13	0	204	7
Exeter City (loan)	2000–01	Third Division	2	0	0	0	0	0	1	0	3	0
Southend United	2000–01	Third Division	14	0	1	0	—		—		15	0
Southend United	2001–02	Third Division	29	4	3	0	1	0	2	1	35	5
Southend United	Total		43	4	4	0	1	0	2	1	50	5
Leyton Orient	2001–02	Third Division	10	1	—		—		—		10	1
Leyton Orient	2002–03	Third Division	28	1	0	0	2	0	0	0	30	1
Leyton Orient	Total		38	2	0	0	2	0	0	0	40	2
Farnborough Town	2003–04	Conference	20	0	1	0	—		1 (Note: Appearance in FA Trophy)	0	22	0
Career total			316	16	21	0	19	2	16	1	372	19

== Honours ==
- Brentford Supporters' Player of the Year: 1997–98
