= Charlie Oatway =

English football midfielder

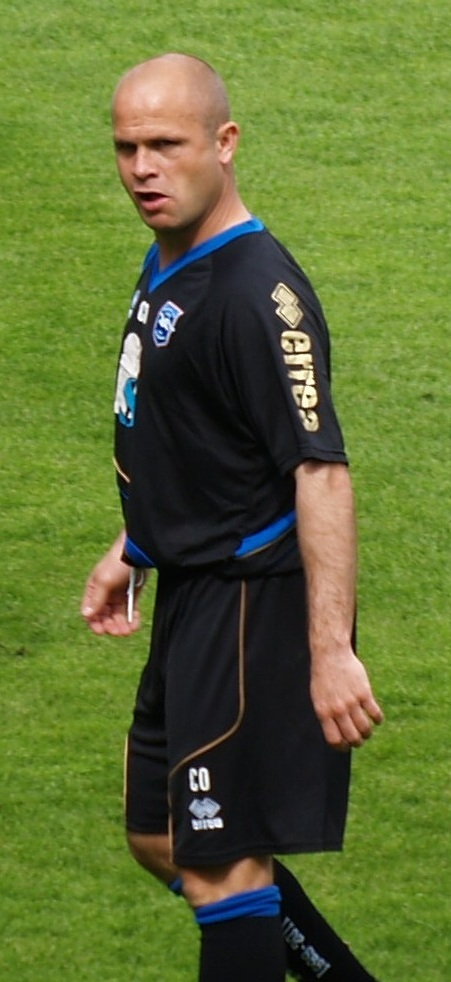
- Oatway in 2011

Personal information
- Full name: Anthony Philip David Terry Frank Donald Stanley Gerry Gordon Reginald Stephen James Oatway
- Date of birth: 28 November 1973 (age 52)
- Place of birth: Hammersmith, England
- Position: Midfielder

Senior career*
Years	Team	Apps	(Gls)
1993–1994	Yeading		
1994–1995	Cardiff City	32	(0)
1995–1997	Torquay United	67	(1)
1997–1999	Brentford	57	(0)
1998	→ Lincoln City (loan)	3	(0)
1999–2007	Brighton & Hove Albion	224	(8)
2007–2009	Havant & Waterlooville	6	(0)
Total		389	(9)
- * Club domestic league appearances and goals

Anthony Philip David Terry Frank Donald Stanley Gerry Gordon Stephen James Oatway (born 28 November 1973), known as Charlie Oatway, is an English former professional footballer who played as a midfielder.

Oatway retired from the professional game in August 2007. He was assistant manager and a player at Havant & Waterlooville but departed the club in June 2009. He is assistant manager at Eastbourne Borough, having previously been an analyst with Shanghai Shenhua, continuing his integral role within Gus Poyet's management team having previously worked with him at Brighton & Hove Albion, Sunderland, AEK Athens and Real Betis Balompié.

== Career ==
Born in Hammersmith, London, Oatway spent eight years at Brighton & Hove Albion and eventually became club captain. He has also played for Cardiff City, Torquay United and Brentford (at all three clubs he played under manager Eddie May) as well as a brief loan spell at Lincoln City. At Brentford he scored once, his strike coming in a 3–0 win over West Bromwich Albion in the League Cup.

Following yet another serious injury, Oatway retired from playing with immediate effect on 2 August 2007. Oatway's career at Brighton was successful. He won the Third Division championship in 2001, the Second Division championship in 2002 and was a Second Division play-off champion in 2004. After his retirement, Oatway spent some time as a sporting liaison for "Albion in the Community", offering coaching sessions at Brighton Hove & Sussex Sixth Form College.

Following his professional retirement, Oatway joined Conference South team Havant & Waterlooville as a player and assistant manager. He departed the Hawks in June 2009 following disagreements about his financial arrangements with the club: the club ceased payments for his playing contract at the end of the 2008–09 season though a new contract solely as assistant manager was offered. Oatway was appointed first-team coach at Brighton & Hove Albion by manager Gus Poyet on 1 December 2009.

On 29 November 2016, Oatway joined Chinese Super League side Shanghai Greenland Shenhua, again serving as a member of the coaching staff under Poyet.

== Personal life ==
Oatway's full name is Anthony Philip David Terry Frank Donald Stanley Gerry Gordon Stephen James Oatway. The reason behind this rather unusual name is the fact that both his parents were Queens Park Rangers fans, and decided to give their son the names of QPR's entire 1973 team. When his parents told his aunt the proposed name, she said "he'd look a right Charlie", and the name stuck. His son, also called Charlie, spent several years working through football developmental squads, including 2009–10 with Bognor Regis Town and 2012–13 with Brighton.

== Honours ==
Brentford

- Football League Third Division: 1998–99

Brighton & Hove Albion

- Football League Second Division: 2001–02; play-offs: 2004
- Football League Third Division: 2000–01
