= Simon Wormull =

British footballer (born 1976)

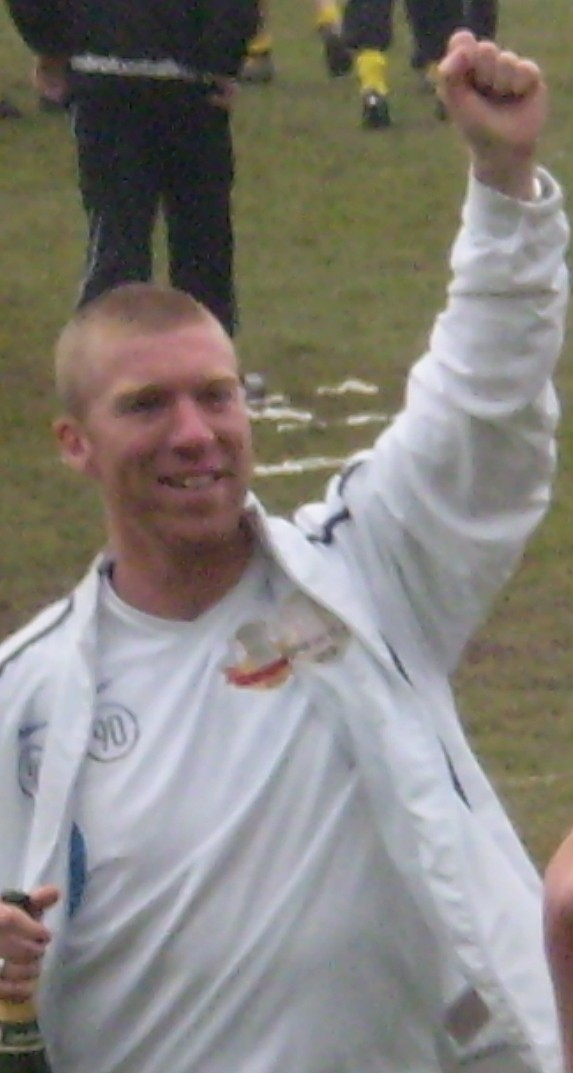
- Wormull celebrates Lewes winning the 2008 Conference South title

Personal information
- Full name: Simon James Wormull
- Date of birth: 1 December 1976 (age 49)
- Place of birth: Crawley, England
- Height: 5 ft 10 in (1.78 m)
- Position: Midfielder

Team information
- Current team: Three Bridges (head coach)

Youth career
- Three Bridges
- Brighton & Hove Albion
- Tottenham Hotspur

Senior career*
| Years | Team | Apps | (Gls) |
| 199?–1997 | Tottenham Hotspur | 0 | (0) |
| 1997–1998 | Brentford | 5 | (0) |
| 1998 | Brighton & Hove Albion | 0 | (0) |
| 1998–2000 | Dover Athletic | 54 | (5) |
| 2000–2001 | Rushden & Diamonds | 24 | (1) |
| 2001–2004 | Stevenage Borough | 73 | (9) |
| 2004 | Hornchurch | 9 | (0) |
| 2004–2006 | Crawley Town | 43 | (4) |
| 2006–2008 | Lewes | 73 | (8) |
| 2008–2009 | Eastbourne Borough | 29 | (2) |
| 2009–2010 | Farnborough | 20 | (1) |
| 2010 | Lewes | 10 | (3) |
| 2010–2011 | Three Bridges | | |
| 2012–2013 | Lewes | | |
| 2013 | Crawley Down Gatwick | | |

International career
| 1999–2002 | England National Game XI | 7 | (0) |

Managerial career
- 2005: Crawley Town (caretaker)
- 2011–2012: Lewes U18
- 2012–2013: Lewes
- 2013: Crawley Down Gatwick
- * Club domestic league appearances and goals as of 12:10, 9 July 2013 (UTC)

Simon James Wormull (born 1 December 1976) is an English former footballer and non-league manager.

As a junior, Wormull played for Tottenham Hotspur in the final of the 1995 FA Youth Cup and in the Intertoto Cup. Although he made a few appearances in the lower divisions of the Football League for Brentford and Rushden & Diamonds, the majority of his playing career was spent in non-league football in the south-east of England. He was capped seven times for the National Game XI, the team that represents England at semi-professional level.

After retirement as a player, Wormull joined the coaching staff of Isthmian League club Lewes, where he was first-team manager from January 2012 to the end of the 2012–13 season. He spent a few months as manager of Crawley Down Gatwick before returning to Three Bridges first as academy head, then as first-team coach.

== Playing career ==
=== Early career ===
Wormull was born in Crawley, West Sussex, and played for the under-15 team at local club Three Bridges before beginning his football career as a schoolboy with Brighton & Hove Albion. He joined Tottenham Hotspur while still a junior, and at the age of 15 became one of the youngest players ever to appear for their reserve team. In 1995, he played in the final of the FA Youth Cup against Manchester United youth team, scoring the opening goal in the first leg, which Tottenham won 2–1. By the time the second leg went to a losing penalty shootout, Wormull had been substituted by Stephen Clemence. The closest he came to first-team football in six years at the club was in the Intertoto Cup, a competition in which Tottenham fielded extremely weak sides, including that which lost 8–0 to FC Cologne.

Released by Tottenham at the end of the 1996–97 season, Wormull joined Second Division club Brentford on a free transfer, marking his debut in the Football League by missing the best chance of the match. He fell out of favour, and following a trial in Brighton & Hove Albion's reserves, was given a month's contract by manager Brian Horton, who described the player as someone who "uses the ball well, ... gets forward and is quite aggressive". Injury prevented him playing for the first team during that period, or during another month at the start of the 1998–99 season; much to Horton's displeasure, Wormull rejected the offer of a further month, preferring to drop down to the Conference with Dover Athletic.

=== Dover Athletic ===
He scored twice in 30 Conference games in his first season with Dover, and his performance earned him international selection, chosen for England's National Game XI for the first time in March 1999. He maintained the standard the following season; Dover's best player against rivals Rushden & Diamonds, he was eventually stretchered off with a damaged Achilles tendon after three opponents were booked for fouling him. Sidelined for a month due to injuries sustained in that match, Wormull returned to play 20 minutes as a substitute before joining Rushden for a fee of £50,000 later that same week. BBC Sport's 2000–01 Football Conference preview said that Dover would miss him, a view later echoed by then assistant manager Clive Walker, who described the 1999–2000 season as "a year when we had players like Simon Wormull, Joe Dunne and Dave Clarke in the team. In all honesty, we weren't far away from having a side good enough to win the division. We needed perhaps two more players to compete at the top – but sadly we ended up selling Dunne and Wormull halfway through the season."

=== Rushden & Diamonds ===
He helped Rushden to runners-up spot in the Conference in 2000, and retained his place in England's semi-professional side. In the 2000–01 season, his appearances were infrequent, and in December 2000, Dover made an unsuccessful attempt to buy him back. He played his part in Rushden's Conference title, and consequent promotion to the Football League. After five games for the club in Division Three, manager Brian Talbot sold Wormull together with striker Jean-Michel Sigere to Conference club Stevenage Borough for "a five-figure sum".

=== Stevenage Borough ===
Wormull helped Stevenage to reach the final of the FA Trophy in 2002, which they lost 2–0 to full-time professional club Yeovil Town. While with the club he won his seventh international cap, and maintained his reputation as a good crosser of the ball who was willing to shoot; in his first two seasons with the club he contributed more shots than any of his teammates, and in his second and third seasons he made most assists. Stevenage began to move towards full-time status before the 2002–03 season. At the end of that season, Wormull submitted a transfer request, because he was struggling to balance work and football commitments. Manager Graham Westley rejected the request, but in April 2004 his contract was cancelled by mutual consent, citing the player's injury record and his difficulties adjusting to the demands of full-time football.

=== Hornchurch and Crawley Town ===
Home-town club Crawley Town's manager Francis Vines hoped to sign Wormull, describing him as a good all-round player who "can play in the middle or wide right and passes the ball well, as well as being useful with set-pieces. He is also good in the tackle", capable of strengthening an already strong midfield. They were unable to match the offer – believed to be £800 a week – from Conference South club Hornchurch, dubbed the "Chelsea of the Conference" because they had a well-paid full-time professional squad despite playing only in the sixth tier of English football. A back injury restricted his Hornchurch appearances, and he had not played for several weeks when, in November 2004, the owner's business collapsed, the players' pay cheques were stopped, and most of the squad left.

Wormull returned home to join Crawley, on much reduced wages, but he failed his medical examination; the club initially offered him a short-term deal while he proved his fitness. At the end of the 2004–05 season he agreed a two-year contract. He turned down offers of full-time football, preferring to stay near home and combine his playing role with running the club's new youth coaching scheme in local schools. A succession of managerial changes following the club's takeover resulted in Wormull acting as caretaker manager for four matches in November 2005, a role in which he made a positive start. During this period he agreed a new contract, but the offer was later withdrawn, and he was given permission to speak to other clubs. Unwilling to leave the Sussex area, he decided to stay with Crawley, but when the club halved the players' wages, thereby breaching their contracts and allowing them to leave on free transfers, Wormull chose to join Conference South club Lewes.

=== Lewes ===
In his first full season with Lewes, Wormull was used in a number of different positions, but in 2007–08, he usually played in central midfield, and felt that the continuity helped his performance. He scored the winning goal against Sutton United in the third qualifying round of the FA Cup, and made an assist for one goal and was involved in the second in the fourth qualifying round, to take the club through to the first round proper for the second year running. Wormull contributed five goals from midfield towards his club winning the Conference South title, though an injured ankle meant he missed the last few weeks of the season.

Following the departure of manager Steve King, the vast majority of the title-winning side left the club. Despite new Lewes manager Kevin Keehan's view that "if I could have had only one player I could keep from last season, it would be Simon" being reflected in the club offering him better terms than did Eastbourne Borough, Wormull, together with teammate Jean-Michel Sigere, joined their local rivals in June 2008.

=== Eastbourne Borough ===
Wormull and Sigere made their debuts in the opening-day defeat to former club Rushden & Diamonds, making Eastbourne the fifth club – following Rushden, Stevenage, Hornchurch and Lewes – where they played alongside each other. After just one season with the club, in which he scored six goals from 37 appearances in all competitions, Wormull's contract was cancelled by mutual consent. He did leave with a winners' medal, earned as an unused substitute in the Sussex Senior Cup final in May 2009, in which Eastbourne beat a Brighton & Hove Albion reserve team 1–0.

=== Farnborough and after ===
Wormull promptly signed a two-year deal with Farnborough, where he linked up with Steve King, his former manager at Lewes, and, for the sixth time in his career, with Jean-Michel Sigere, though only briefly, as Sigere was released a few days later. Wormull helped Farnborough win the 2009–10 Southern League title, playing 39 games in all competitions (20 in the league), before cancelling his contract by mutual consent at the end of that first season. He rejoined Lewes a few days later, staying with them until December, when he joined Sussex County League side Three Bridges, preferring for family reasons to play for a club nearer his home. According to Three Bridges' manager, the club were "absolutely chuffed to pieces to have such a magnificent player playing for us". Wormull tore knee ligaments in April 2011, and retired from competitive football at the end of the season.

== Coaching career ==
Wormull then returned to Lewes, to join Steve King's management team in the role of under-18 team manager with support coaching involvement with the first team. When King was suspended by the club in January 2012, Wormull was "asked to assist with First Team Management duties". and the following week, after King's departure, he was appointed caretaker manager until the end of the season. He registered as a player, and made his third debut for Lewes from the substitutes' bench as his team lost 2–1 at home to Canvey Island in the Isthmian League Premier Division. In April, with Lewes on the verge of the play-offs, Wormull's appointment was made permanent. The club's directors said he had "impressed everybody with his combination of professionalism, diligence and approachability", and that "his new regime of training and insightful, value for money signings has transformed the team". In his second season, Lewes narrowly avoided relegation. The board's view was that "being involved in a relegation battle was extremely disappointing", and an experience that was "particularly difficult" in context of the club's hard work towards "creat[ing] a platform from which to start building again", and Wormull was dismissed at the end of the season. He was "devastated" by the decision, believing he had "buil[t] a good foundation" for the future, despite being "decimated with injuries" and working to what he described as "a huge reduction in the budget".

Wormull took over as manager of Isthmian League Division One South club Crawley Down Gatwick in June 2013. Wormull led the team to the top of the table with five wins and a draw from their first six matches, a performance that earned him the Isthmian South Manager of the Month award for August. They had fallen to sixth by early November, when he resigned his post for what were described as "personal and family reasons".

In February 2014, Wormull returned to football as head of the youth academy at one of his former employers, fellow Isthmian South club Three Bridges. At the end of the season, he was appointed head first-team coach, to work with manager Paul Faili.

== Honours ==
Tottenham Hotspur

- FA Youth Cup finalist: 1995

Rushden & Diamonds

- Football Conference: 2000–01
- Football Conference runners-up: 1999–2000

Stevenage Borough

- FA Trophy finalist: 2002

Lewes

- Conference South: 2007–08

Eastbourne Borough

- Sussex Senior Cup: 2008–09

Farnborough

- Southern League Premier Division: 2009–10
