= Leon Townley =

English footballer (born 1976)

Personal information
- Full name: Leon Townley
- Date of birth: 16 February 1976 (age 50)
- Place of birth: Loughton, England
- Height: 1.88 m (6 ft 2 in)
- Position: Defender

Youth career
- 1992–1994: Tottenham Hotspur

Senior career*
| Years | Team | Apps | (Gls) |
| 1994–1997 | Tottenham Hotspur | 0 | (0) |
| 1997–1999 | Brentford | 16 | (2) |
| 1999 | → Slough Town (loan) | 7 | (2) |
| 1999–2001 | Slough Town | 58 | (1) |
| 2001–2002 | Aldershot Town | 43 | (1) |
| 2002 | St Albans City | 16 | (0) |
| 2002 | → Windsor & Eton (loan) | | |
| 2002–2004 | Windsor & Eton | | |
| 2004–2005 | Boreham Wood | 4 | (1) |
| 2005 | Hitchin Town | 6 | (0) |

Managerial career
- 2008–2009: Debden Sports (reserves)
- * Club domestic league appearances and goals

Leon Townley (born 16 February 1976) is an English retired semi-professional footballer, best remembered for his spell as a defender with Brentford in the Football League between 1997 and 1999. After his release, he dropped into non-League football and retired from senior football in 2005.

== Career ==
=== Tottenham Hotspur ===
Townley began his career as a trainee at Premier League club Tottenham Hotspur in 1992 and signed a professional contract at the age of 18 in 1994. Townley received his maiden call into the first team for Spurs' 1995 Intertoto Cup campaign, though he failed to make an appearance and was an unused substitute during an infamous 8–0 defeat to 1. FC Köln in July 1995. Townley left White Hart Lane in 1997, after failing to break into the first team.

=== Brentford ===
On 18 September 1997, Townley joined Second Division club Brentford on a three-year contract for a £25,000 fee, rising to £55,000 on appearances. He made his debut the following day with a starting appearance in a 1–1 home league draw with Wycombe Wanderers. He scored his first Brentford goals in a 3–1 win over Blackpool on 13 December 1997, scoring his first after two Blackpool players were sent off on the hour mark and scoring again in the 78th minute. He fell out of favour with new manager Micky Adams in January 1998 and finished the 1997–98 season with 19 appearances and three goals.

After Brentford's relegation to the Third Division in May 1998, incoming manager Ron Noades elected to transfer-list Townley during the 1998 off-season. He failed to make a single appearance during the Bees' 1998–99 Third Division championship-winning season and instead played for the reserve team. Townley left the club in September 1999, when his contract was cancelled by mutual consent.

=== Non-League football ===
Townley joined Isthmian League Premier Division club Slough Town on a one-month loan on 23 August 1999 and the move was made permanent in September 1999. A virtual ever-present, Townley made a total of 48 appearances in all competitions during the 1999–00 season and scored four goals. He made 33 appearances during the 2000–01 season and left the club after its relegation to the Isthmian League First Division in May 2001. Townley made a total of 81 appearances during his time at Arbour Park and scored four goals.

Between 2001 and 2009, Townley played in the Isthmian, Southern and Hertfordshire Senior County Leagues for Aldershot Town, St Albans City, Windsor & Eton, Boreham Wood, Hitchin Town and Debden Sports.

== Career statistics ==
Appearances and goals by club, season and competition
| Club | Season | League | | | FA Cup | | League Cup | | Europe | | Other | | Total | |
| Club | Season | Division | Apps | Goals | Apps | Goals | Apps | Goals | Apps | Goals | Apps | Goals | Apps | Goals |
|---|---|---|---|---|---|---|---|---|---|---|---|---|---|---|
| Tottenham Hotspur | 1995–96 | Premier League | 0 | 0 | 0 | 0 | 0 | 0 | 0 | 0 | — | | 0 | 0 |
| Brentford | 1997–98 | Second Division | 18 | 2 | 1 | 0 | 1 | 0 | — | | 1 (Note: Appearance in Football League Trophy) | 1 | 19 | 3 |
| Slough Town | 1999–00 | Isthmian League Premier Division | 35 | 2 | 3 | 0 | — | | — | | 10 (Note: 4 appearances and 1 goal in Berks & Bucks Senior Cup, 4 appearances and 1 goal in Isthmian League Full Members Cup, 1 appearance in FA Trophy, 1 appearance in Isthmian League Cup) | 2 | 48 | 4 |
| Slough Town | 2000–01 | Isthmian League Premier Division | 30 | 0 | 0 | 0 | — | | — | | 3 (Note: 1 appearance in FA Trophy, 1 appearance in Isthmian League Cup, 1 appearance in Isthmian League Full Members Cup) | 0 | 33 | 0 |
| Slough Town | Total | | 65 | 2 | 3 | 0 | — | | — | | 13 | 2 | 81 | 4 |
| Aldershot Town | 2001–02 | Isthmian League Premier Division | 25 | 1 | 0 | 0 | — | | — | | 0 | 0 | 43 | 1 |
| St Albans City | 2002–03 | Isthmian League Premier Division | 16 | 1 | 2 | 0 | — | | — | | 2 (Note: 1 appearance and 1 goal in Herts Charity Cup, 1 appearance in Herts Senior Cup) | 1 | 20 | 2 |
| Boreham Wood | 2004–05 | Southern League First Division East | 2 | 0 | 0 | 0 | — | | — | | 0 | 0 | 2 | 0 |
| Boreham Wood | 2005–06 | Southern League First Division East | 2 | 1 | 0 | 0 | — | | — | | 0 | 0 | 2 | 1 |
| Boreham Wood | Total | | 4 | 1 | 0 | 0 | — | | — | | 0 | 0 | 4 | 1 |
| Hitchin Town | 2005–06 | Southern League Premier Division | 6 | 0 | — | | — | | — | | 2 (Note: Appearances in FA Trophy) | 0 | 8 | 0 |
| Career total | | | 134 | 7 | 6 | 0 | 1 | 0 | 0 | 0 | 18 | 4 | 159 | 11 |
