= Scott Canham =

English footballer

Personal information
- Full name: Scott Walter Canham
- Date of birth: 11 November 1974 (age 52)
- Place of birth: Newham, London, England
- Position: Midfielder

Youth career
- West Ham United

Senior career*
Years	Team	Apps	(Gls)
1993–1996	West Ham United	0	(0)
1995	→ Torquay United (loan)	3	(0)
1996	→ Brentford (loan)	14	(0)
1996–1998	Brentford	34	(1)
1998–1999	Leyton Orient	9	(0)
1999–2000	Chesham United		
2000–2003	Leyton Orient	40	(6)
2003	→ Woking (loan)	10	(2)
2003–2005	Woking	50	(3)
2005–2006	Farnborough Town	49	(4)
2006	Grays Athletic	0	(0)
2006–2007	Thurrock	14	(2)
Total		223	(18)
- * Club domestic league appearances and goals

Scott Walter Canham (born 11 November 1974) is an English former professional footballer who played in the Football League as a midfielder for Torquay United, Brentford and Leyton Orient. He went on to play for several years in non-League football.

== Career ==
Canham was born in Newham, London, and was associated with West Ham United from the age of nine. As a young professional he spent a month on loan at Torquay United in late 1995, where he made his debut in the Football League, and in January 1996, joined Brentford on loan for the remainder of the season, in which he played 14 league games. West Ham offered him a new two-year contract, which he turned down; so, in August 1996, Canham returned to Brentford on a permanent basis for a fee of around £25,000, potentially rising to £60,000 depending on appearances. He was the subject of scrutiny at a fans forum where fans questioned then manager Harry Redknapp as to why he was allowed to leave and Frank Lampard was allowed to stay.

He played 35 league games for Brentford, 11 of which were as a substitute, scoring only once before being released after Brentford's relegation in the summer of 1998. On 10 August 1998 he joined Leyton Orient, but the form of the other midfielders at Brisbane Road limited his chances and he joined Isthmian Premier League side Chesham United for a month's loan on 22 December. On his return to Orient, he failed to reappear in their first team, and in August 2000 was released to join Chesham United.

Such was his form for Chesham the following season, that Orient manager Tommy Taylor, who had released him a year before, brought Canham back to Brisbane Road for the 2001–02 season. He earned a contract extension, but then fell out of favour, and joined Conference club Woking on loan in March 2003. After helping them avoid relegation, he joined the club on a free transfer at the end of the 2002–03 season. In February 2005 he moved to Farnborough Town, where he spent some time as joint manager alongside Gerry Murphy, but moved nearer his Romford home at the end of the 2005–06 season when he linked up with his former Farnborough manager Frank Gray at Grays Athletic. Released after a couple of months without having appeared for the first team, he then moved to neighbours Thurrock.

In May 2008, Canham became assistant manager to his former Leyton Orient teammate Carl Griffiths at Brentwood Town, but the pair left the club before the 2009–10 season.

== Personal life ==
As of July 2012, Canham was running his own car repair business.
