= Gus Hurdle =

Barbadian footballer (born 1973)

Personal information
- Full name: Augustus Athel Hurdle
- Date of birth: 14 October 1973 (age 53)
- Place of birth: Kensington, England
- Position: Defender

Senior career*
| Years | Team | Apps | (Gls) |
| 1992–1993 | Fulham | 0 | (0) |
| 1993–1994 | Dorchester Town | | |
| 1994–1998 | Brentford | 71 | (0) |
| 1998 | Plymouth Argyle | 0 | (0) |
| 1998–1999 | Bognor Regis Town | | |
| 1999 | Whyteleafe | | |
| 1999–2000 | Basingstoke Town | | |
| 1999 | → Carshalton Athletic (loan) | 19 | (3) |
| 2000 | → Crawley Town (loan) | 18 | (4) |
| 2000 | St Albans City | | |
| 2000–2001 | Dulwich Hamlet | | |
| 2001 | Crawley Town | 4 | (0) |
| 2001–2002 | Yeading | 5 | (0) |
| 2002–2003 | Molesey | | |
| 2003–2004 | Egham Town | | |
| 2004–2005 | Walton & Hersham | 2 | (0) |

International career
| 1996–2000 | Barbados | 7 | (0) |
- * Club domestic league appearances and goals

Augustus Athel Hurdle (born 14 October 1973) is a former professional footballer who played as a defender.

Born in England, he represented Barbados at international level.

== Club career ==
Hurdle began his career with Fulham, but never made an appearance for the team. After a year spent in non-league football with Dorchester Town, Hurdle signed for Brentford in 1994, making 90 appearances over the next four seasons. After leaving Brentford in 1998, Hurdle signed for Plymouth Argyle, but never made a league appearance for the team and left after just a month, moving to non-league side Bognor Regis Town.

Hurdle later played non-league football for Basingstoke Town. While at Basingstoke, Hurdle spent a loan spell at Crawley Town.

Hurdle also appeared for a number of other non-league sides, including Whyteleafe, Carshalton Athletic, St Albans City, Dulwich Hamlet, Yeading, Molesey, Egham Town and Walton & Hersham.

== International career ==
Hurdle represented Barbados at international level. In March 2000, he turned down a chance to play internationally to help Crawley Town in their Southern Football League Premier Division relegation battle, stating he would prefer to play against Dorchester Town saying it was the "bigger game". He said: "Crawley's need is far greater than that of Barbados. They'll be able to get a result without me, but it's big match for Crawley and a game we can't afford to lose". He has also represented a Caribbean All Stars team in an exhibition game against Jamaica at the Giants Stadium, New Jersey in March 1999.

== Personal life ==
After leaving Fulham and prior to returning to professional football in 1994, Hurdle worked as a bus driver. As of May 2011, he was working as a production manager in television.
