= Malcolm McPherson =

Scottish former professional footballer and coach (born 1974)

Personal information
- Full name: Malcolm McPherson
- Date of birth: 9 December 1974 (age 51)
- Place of birth: Glasgow, Scotland
- Position: Forward

Senior career*
Years	Team	Apps	(Gls)
1992–1993	Yeovil Town	18	(2)
1993–1996	West Ham United	0	(0)
1994–1995	→ Dagenham & Redbridge (loan)		
1996	→ IFK Norrköping (loan)		
1996–1998	Brentford	13	(0)
Total		31	(2)

Managerial career
- 2015–2016: Eastern Suburbs (NZ)
- 2019–2021: North Shore United AFC
- * Club domestic league appearances and goals

Malcolm McPherson (born 9 December 1974) is a Scottish former professional footballer and coach. He played in England for Yeovil Town, West Ham United, and Brentford, and in Sweden’s top tier for Allsvenskan club IFK Norrköping. After retiring from playing, he managed Eastern Suburbs AFC and North Shore United AFC in New Zealand, winning domestic league and cup titles.

== Playing career ==
McPherson began his senior career with Yeovil Town, making his debut aged 17 during the 1992–93 Vauxhall Conference season. He was part of the squad for Yeovil’s 1–0 FA Cup win over Fulham on 15 November 1993 at Huish Park.

During the 1993–94 season, McPherson transferred to West Ham United from Yeovil Town for an initial fee of £30,000, with appearance-based add-ons reportedly increasing the total to £200,000. His three seasons at West Ham were hampered by persistent injuries, and he did not make a competitive first-team appearance. He featured in the club’s 1995 Centenary tour of Australia, scoring in a 2–2 draw with a Western Australia Select XI and netting the winner against the Australian Olympic team in Brisbane, a side that included Kevin Muscat and Danny Tiatto.

In 1994–95 McPherson had a loan spell with Dagenham & Redbridge. In early 1996 he joined the Allsvenskan top-tier club IFK Norrköping on loan, making his home debut in April and scoring in a 4–1 victory over Örebro SK.

Later in 1996, McPherson signed for Brentford. He made 13 league appearances and was part of the squad that reached the 1997 Second Division play-off final, losing to Crewe Alexandra. He played in the 1997 FA Cup third-round tie against Manchester City, and in the 1997–98 season featured in league matches at Craven Cottage (vs Fulham) and Turf Moor (vs Burnley). Post-Brentford, he left football before returning to playing and coaching in New Zealand in his early thirties.

== Coaching career ==
In 2015, McPherson was appointed head coach of Eastern Suburbs AFC, guiding the club to both the Northern Premier League title and the Chatham Cup.

In 2019, he became head coach of North Shore United, winning the Northern Premier League in his first season. In 2021, North Shore United reached the Chatham Cup semi-finals but withdrew due to COVID-19 concerns.
