= Eddie May =

English footballer and manager (1943–2012)

Personal information
- Full name: Edwin Charles May
- Date of birth: 19 May 1943
- Place of birth: Epping, England
- Date of death: 14 April 2012 (aged 68)
- Place of death: Barry, Wales
- Position: Defender

Senior career*
Years	Team	Apps	(Gls)
–1965	Dagenham		
1965–1968	Southend United	105	(3)
1968–1976	Wrexham	334	(35)
1975	→ Chicago Sting (loan)	18	(7)
1976–1978	Swansea City	90	(8)
Total		547	(53)

Managerial career
- 1978–1983: Leicester City (Asst Manager)
- 1983–1986: Charlton Athletic (Asst Manager)
- 1988: Newport County
- 1991–1994: Cardiff City
- 1994–1995: Barry Town
- 1995: Cardiff City
- 1995–1996: Torquay United
- 1997: Dundalk
- 1997: Brentford
- 1999–2000: Drogheda United
- 2000–2001: Express
- 2001–2003: Highlanders
- 2008–2010: Porthcawl Town
- * Club domestic league appearances and goals

Edwin Charles May (19 May 1943 – 14 April 2012) was an English football player and manager. May was born in Epping, and played for Dagenham, Southend United, Wrexham and Swansea City.

May contributed to the development of Welsh football. During his playing prime in the first half of the 1970s he played in the Wrexham rearguard, totalling some 400 senior appearances for The Racecourse club scoring 35 goals, all with his head. Later his stint in coaching and management sent him to the helm of Cardiff City, whom he guided to the double of Third Division title and Welsh Cup glory in 1992–93. He also served Swansea City as a player and, fleetingly, Newport County as a coach, thus becoming one of the few men to be associated with all four of Wales' most famous clubs.

== Playing career ==
May's first League employers were Southend United, whom he joined from Dagenham in January 1965, making his debut for the Third Division Shrimpers that spring as a left-back. Soon, though, the muscular six-footer found his natural position as a dominant centre-half, majestic in the air, powerful and unfailingly courageous, but his fine personal form could not prevent the Roots Hall side from sinking to the bottom division in the spring of 1966. He went on to make 100 league appearances, scoring 3 times for the Shrimpers, before moving to Wrexham in June 1968 for a fee of £5,000.

In June 1968 May was sold to Fourth Division rivals Wrexham for £5,000 and he settled rapidly at the Racecourse Ground, playing an influential role as the Robins were promoted in 1970 as runners-up to Chesterfield. Thereafter he became captain, leading John Neal's enterprising side to Welsh Cup success in 1972 and in two other rousing knockout campaigns. In 1973-74 Wrexham reached the last eight of the FA Cup, beating the soon-to-be-crowned Second Division champions Middlesbrough and top-flight Southampton before bowing 1–0 to Burnley, then among the top six clubs in the country.

Then in 1975-76 May was an inspirational part of the side which made it to the quarter-finals of the European Cup- Winners' Cup, where they went down 2–1 on aggregate to the illustrious Belgians, Anderlecht. The following August, aged 33 and having missed only 34 League games in his eight seasons in North Wales, he was freed to join Fourth Division Swansea City having spent the 1975 summer with NASL side Chicago Sting. During his Swans career he scored 8 times in 90 games and was a member of the 1978 promotion winning squad. May retired from the game shortly after.

In recent years, May was inducted into The Wrexham FC Hall of Fame.

== Coaching and managerial career ==
=== Early coaching career ===
May loved the game far too much to leave it and later in 1978 became a coach at Leicester City, contributing to the Foxes' Second Division title campaign of 1979-80 under Jock Wallace. During his time at Filbert Street May played a pivotal part in the progression of striker Gary Lineker having initially taken him under his wing as youth team manager. He then moved to South London and became assistant manager to Lennie Lawrence at Charlton Athletic between 1983 and 1986, the year in which the Addicks were second division runners up. Next came coaching berths in Qatar, Kenya and Iceland, a month in charge of cash-strapped Newport County in the wake of their 1988 demotion from the Football League, a spell as No.2 with Lincoln City and more coaching in Norway before he accepted the reins of Cardiff City in the summer of 1991 following a stint helping the club's youngsters.

=== Cardiff City ===
May's drive and enthusiasm were exactly what the bottom-tier Bluebirds needed, and after one term of consolidation he led them to a league and cup double winning both the Fourth Division title and Welsh Cup in 1993, becoming only the second Cardiff manager to lift a divisional crown, the other being Billy McCandless, who achieved Division Three (South) success in 1947. As Welsh Champions May lead City into Europe on two occasions going out to Admira Wacker in 1992 and to Belgian side Standard Liege in 1993.

In 1993–94, with precious little money at his disposal, he did well to avert relegation and to preside over one of the most joyous afternoons in Ninian Park history, when visiting Manchester City were knocked out of the FA Cup. However, the club's finances were in a mess, the team were struggling following a difficult takeover and in November 1994 he was sacked. So loyal was May, though, that when his replacement, Terry Yorath, was also dismissed in the spring, he returned until the season's end, which brought inevitable relegation and his second exit.

May remains well regarded among Cardiff fans, having been nicknamed ‘The Ayatollah.’ His popularity at Cardiff was reflected in his invitation to manage one of the two sides that played the inaugural match at the club’s new stadium in 2009. The opposing manager was Lennie Lawrence, whom May had previously assisted at Charlton Athletic and who also managed Cardiff during his career.

In a fans poll recently May was voted the most popular Cardiff City manager of all time.

There after came brief stints in charge of Torquay United, Dundalk in the Republic of Ireland and Brentford, followed by coaching assignments around the world, including jobs in Finland, Zimbabwe (where he led the Highlanders club to two league championships), South Africa, Uganda and Malawi.

=== Death ===
May died at the age of 68 at his home in Barry, South Wales in April 2012. His ashes are scattered at the memorial garden at The Cardiff City Stadium and a Memorial Plaque hangs on the Ninian Park Gates in his honour.

== Honours ==
Cardiff City

- Football League Third Division: 1992–93
- Welsh Cup: 1991–92, 1992–93

Highlanders

- Zimbabwean League: 2001, 2002, 2003
