= 1995–96 Gillingham F.C. season =

English football club season

Gillingham
1995–96 season
- Chairman: Paul Scally
- Manager: Tony Pulis
- Third Division: 2nd
- FA Cup: Third round
- League Cup: First round
- League Trophy: Group stage
- Top goalscorer: League: Leo Fortune-West (12); All: Leo Fortune-West (15)
- Highest home attendance: 10,595 vs Preston North End (9 March 1996)
- Lowest home attendance: 1,866 vs Hereford United (7 November 1995)
| Home colours | Away colours |

During the 1995–96 English football season, Gillingham F.C. competed in the Football League Third Division, the fourth tier of the English football league system. It was the 64th season in which Gillingham competed in the Football League, and the 46th since the club was voted back into the league in 1950. After being in severe financial difficulties for several months, Gillingham had been saved from going out of business during the summer of 1995 by new chairman Paul Scally, who purchased the club for a nominal fee and appointed Tony Pulis as the team's new manager. Having signed many new players, Gillingham began the season strongly with four consecutive wins and remained in the top three positions in the Third Division for the entire season, finishing in second place. The club thus gained promotion to the Second Division seven years after being relegated from the third tier.

Gillingham reached the third round of the FA Cup, but were eliminated at the earliest stage of both the Football League Cup and the Football League Trophy. The team played a total of 54 competitive matches, winning 24, drawing 20, and losing 10. The team's top goalscorer was Leo Fortune-West, who scored 12 goals in the Third Division and 15 across all competitions. Goalkeeper Jim Stannard played the most games for Gillingham, being absent for only one of the team's 54 matches; he played in all the club's League matches, in which he kept 29 clean sheets and conceded only 20 goals, both new Football League records for a 46-match season. The highest attendance recorded at the club's home ground, Priestfield Stadium, was 10,595, for a game against promotion rivals Preston North End.

== Background and pre-season ==
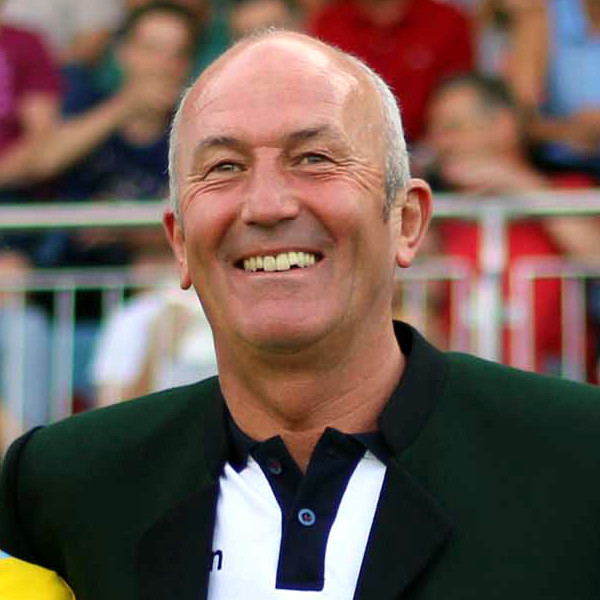
Tony Pulis (pictured in 2014) was appointed as the club's new manager.

The 1995–96 season was Gillingham's 64th season playing in the Football League and the 46th since the club was elected back into the League in 1950 after being voted out in 1938. It was the club's seventh consecutive season in the fourth tier of the English football league system, which since 1992 had been named the Football League Third Division. In the 1994–95 season, Gillingham had finished 19th, three places off the bottom of the division.

In January 1995, after nearly a decade of financial difficulties, the club had been declared insolvent and placed in administrative receivership with debts of approximately £2,000,000. At the end of the 1994–95 season, with no rescue deal finalised, fans were unsure whether the club would still be in existence to start the next season; one takeover bid had already collapsed when the leader of the consortium resigned after adverse publicity surrounding his financial status. In early June, however, shareholders and creditors voted overwhelmingly to accept a takeover bid from Sevenoaks-based businessman Paul Scally, who paid a nominal fee to purchase the club. The deal was finalised at the end of the month, one day before a deadline imposed on the club by the Football League to be out of receivership or face expulsion, and Scally was officially named as the club's new chairman. He appointed former Gillingham player Tony Pulis to the vacant position of manager; Pulis had been out of football for a year since leaving the manager's job at AFC Bournemouth.

Pulis significantly rebuilt the team ahead of the new season, with eight new players joining the club. Three new signings were announced at the same time as Scally's takeover and the appointment of Pulis: forward Leo Fortune-West joined from non-League club Stevenage Borough for a transfer fee of £5,000, which was donated by Gillingham's official supporters' club from funds collected earlier in the year as part of its efforts to save the club, goalkeeper Jim Stannard was signed from Fulham, and Kevin Rattray arrived from non-League club Woking. Subsequent signings included midfielder Mark O'Connor, who had previously played for the club between 1989 and 1993; he had played under Pulis's management at Bournemouth. Midfielder Dave Martin joined from Bristol City on a free transfer and was immediately installed as the new club captain. Simon Ratcliffe joined from Brentford, and shortly before the first match of the season, Mark Harris and Dominic Naylor arrived from Swansea City and Plymouth Argyle respectively. The team prepared for the new season with a number of friendly matches, including one against Premier League club Chelsea, who sent a full-strength team including high-profile new signings Ruud Gullit and Mark Hughes. The match drew a crowd of over 10,000, with many more turned away, and provided a significant funding boost for the club. Gillingham adopted a new first-choice kit featuring blue and black striped shirts; the away shirts, to be worn in the event of a clash of colours with the home team, were red and black. The team were forced to wear the previous season's kit for the first four games, however, as the suppliers of the new kit failed to deliver it on time.

== Third Division ==
=== August–December ===
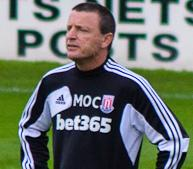
Mark O'Connor (pictured in 2013) suffered a broken leg in November and missed the rest of the season.

Gillingham began the season with a 2–1 victory at home to Wigan Athletic; new signings Martin, Naylor, Fortune-West, Ratcliffe, Stannard, O'Connor and Harris all made their debuts for the club and Fortune-West scored the winning goal. Seven days later Dennis Bailey, who had joined the club from Queens Park Rangers shortly after the opening game, made his league debut and scored in a 3–0 win over Lincoln City. The team's winning run extended to four games with victories over Cambridge United and Barnet, after which Gillingham were top of the league table; it was the first time that Gillingham had opened a league season with four wins. The winning run came to an end with a defeat by Colchester United on 2 September and in the next two games the team only managed two draws and dropped to second place in the table.

The team held another promotion-chasing team, Chester City, to a 1–1 draw and then secured two more wins without conceding a goal. The second of these, at home to Rochdale, drew an attendance of 7,782, the largest of the season to date and the highest attendance for a league game at Priestfield Stadium since 1989. Alex Watson, recently signed on loan from Pulis' former club Bournemouth, scored the only goal of that game. Pulis was named the divisional Manager of the Month for September, the first time that a Gillingham manager had achieved this feat for ten years. Gillingham achieved their biggest win of the season on 21 October, defeating Doncaster Rovers 4–0. After this result, Gillingham were three points clear of second-placed Preston North End and had conceded only five goals in thirteen matches, fewer than half the number allowed by any other team in the division. The team only scored a single goal across the next three games, however, achieving a 1–1 draw and two 0–0 draws, after which they had slipped to third in the table.

Victory over Scarborough on 18 November took Gillingham back into second place in the division. A week later, the team played Fulham in a match noted for its aggression; two Fulham players were sent off and close to the end of the game Gillingham's O'Connor suffered a broken leg after a rough tackle by an opponent. This incident led to a mass brawl involving almost every player on the pitch; both clubs were later fined by the football authorities for failing to control their players. O'Connor would not play another game for more than a year after the injury and was forced to retire from professional football in 1997. The scheduled game against Chester City on 9 December was postponed, allowing Preston North End to move above Gillingham into second place on goal difference. The team played away to Preston on 23 December in front of a crowd of 10,682, the largest attendance of the season for any match involving Gillingham. The game between the two promotion contenders ended in a 0–0 draw. Gillingham's final match of 1995 resulted in a 1–0 victory over Plymouth Argyle; the year ended with Gillingham in second place, two points behind Chester City, although Chester had played one more game. Gillingham would remain in the top two positions for the rest of the season.

=== January–May ===
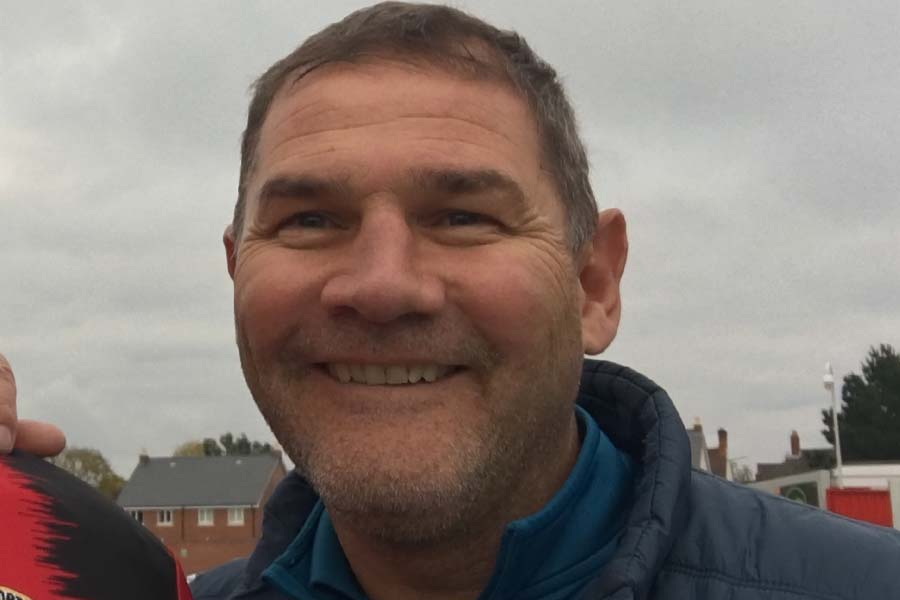
Steve Castle (pictured in 2020) scored on his debut for the club in February.

Gillingham began 1996 with consecutive wins over Leyton Orient, Chester City, and Lincoln City. The first of these victories took the team back to the top of the table. Against Chester, Steve Butler, who had joined the club from Cambridge United in December, achieved the team's only hat-trick of the season, scoring all three goals in a 3–1 victory in a 17-minute spell. On 3 February, the team were held to a 0–0 draw by Cambridge after both Ratcliffe and Fortune-West were sent off, reducing the Gillingham team to nine players. By mid-February, Gillingham were eight points ahead of second-placed Preston and had still only conceded 10 goals in 29 matches; the second-best defensive record in the division was held by Preston, who had conceded 25 goals, and only two other teams in the division had allowed fewer than 30. Midfielder Steve Castle joined on loan from Birmingham City and scored on his debut against Hereford United on 17 February. The team failed to score any goals in the next three games, however, resulting in a draw and two defeats. Striker Bailey, who had scored six goals in his first 13 games for the club, had now gone 19 games without scoring at all.

On 9 March, first-placed Gillingham drew 1–1 at home to second-placed Preston; the crowd of 10,595 was the largest attendance of the season at Priestfield Stadium. During the following week, with the team having only scored one goal in five games, Pulis bolstered his attacking options by signing striker John Gayle on loan from Stoke City. Gayle scored the only goal on his debut in a 1–0 victory over Mansfield Town and scored again a week later in a 1–1 draw with Leyton Orient. The next game resulted in a 2–0 defeat to Rochdale, after which Gillingham fell to second place in the table and were overtaken by Preston, who would go on to remain atop the division for the rest of the season. On 6 April, Gillingham beat Hartlepool United 2–0. It was the 25th game of the season in which Stannard had kept a clean sheet, breaking the previous club record set by John Simpson in the 1963–64 season.

After an unbeaten run of six games following the defeat to Rochdale, Gillingham went into the penultimate match of the season away to Fulham knowing that victory would clinch promotion to the Second Division. Although the match ended in a 0–0 draw, third-placed Bury's failure to defeat Exeter City meant that promotion was still confirmed. Gillingham's final match resulted in a 1–0 victory at home to Scarborough. The team finished the season in second place, three points behind Preston and four points ahead of third-placed Bury. The season was notable for the team's strong defence but also the low number of goals they scored; in only 12 out of 46 games did the team score more than one goal, and the total of 49 goals scored was the lowest of any team that finished in the top half of any of the Football League's three divisions. In March, Keith Pike of The Times had characterised the Gillingham team as "an army of six-footers able to belt the ball into orbit and tackle themselves into a frenzy" and stated that their approach to the game was effective but unattractive to watch and had "no craft, no flair, no guile". After the final game of the season, the same writer said that Gillingham had "not endeared themselves to the third division and, with luck, will get found out in the second".

=== Match details ===
Key

- In result column, Gillingham's score shown first
- H = Home match
- A = Away match
- pen. = Penalty kick
- o.g. = Own goal

Results

| Date | Opponents | Result | Goalscorers | Attendance |
|---|---|---|---|---|
| 12 August 1995 | Wigan Athletic (H) | 2–1 | Foster, Fortune-West | 4,099 |
| 19 August 1995 | Lincoln City (A) | 3–0 | Fortune-West, Bailey, Brightwell (o.g.) | 2,822 |
| 26 August 1995 | Cambridge United (H) | 3–0 | Fortune-West, Bailey, Rattray | 5,093 |
| 29 August 1995 | Barnet (A) | 2–0 | Rattray, Naylor | 3,077 |
| 2 September 1995 | Colchester United (H) | 0–1 | | 7,677 |
| 9 September 1995 | Scunthorpe United (A) | 1–1 | Bailey | 2,423 |
| 12 September 1995 | Hereford United (A) | 0–0 | | 1,740 |
| 16 September 1995 | Cardiff City (H) | 1–0 | Fortune-West | 5,314 |
| 23 September 1995 | Chester City (A) | 1–1 | Martin | 3,886 |
| 30 September 1995 | Bury (H) | 3–0 | Bailey, Fortune-West (2) | 6,018 |
| 7 October 1995 | Rochdale (H) | 1–0 | A.Watson | 7,782 |
| 14 October 1995 | Darlington (A) | 0–1 | | 2,043 |
| 21 October 1995 | Doncaster Rovers (H) | 4–0 | O'Connor, Ratcliffe, Bailey, Harris | 6,302 |
| 28 October 1995 | Hartlepool United (A) | 1–1 | Bailey (pen.) | 2,355 |
| 31 October 1995 | Exeter City (A) | 0–0 | | 3,024 |
| 4 November 1995 | Northampton Town (H) | 0–0 | | 7,206 |
| 18 November 1995 | Scarborough (A) | 2–0 | Green, Fortune-West | 1,546 |
| 25 November 1995 | Fulham (H) | 1–0 | Fortune-West | 7,608 |
| 16 December 1995 | Bury (A) | 0–1 | | 3,045 |
| 23 December 1995 | Preston North End (A) | 0–0 | | 10,682 |
| 26 December 1995 | Plymouth Argyle (H) | 1–0 | S.Butler (pen.) | 9,651 |
| 1 January 1996 | Leyton Orient (A) | 1–0 | Fortune-West | 7,090 |
| 9 January 1996 | Chester City (H) | 3–1 | S.Butler (3) | 9,186 |
| 13 January 1996 | Lincoln City (H) | 2–0 | Fortune-West, Ratfcliffe | 8,040 |
| 20 January 1996 | Wigan Athletic (A) | 1–2 | Green | 2,773 |
| 30 January 1996 | Mansfield Town (H) | 2–0 | Rattray, T.Butler | 6,111 |
| 3 February 1996 | Cambridge United (A) | 0–0 | | 4,114 |
| 10 February 1996 | Torquay United (H) | 2–0 | Smith, Ratcliffe | 7,116 |
| 13 February 1996 | Barnet (H) | 1–0 | S.Butler | 6,428 |
| 17 February 1996 | Hereford United (H) | 1–1 | Castle | 6,987 |
| 24 February 1996 | Cardiff City (A) | 0–2 | | 3,028 |
| 27 February 1996 | Scunthorpe United (H) | 0–0 | | 5,547 |
| 2 March 1996 | Plymouth Argyle (A) | 0–1 | | 8,540 |
| 9 March 1996 | Preston North End (H) | 1–1 | Harris | 10,595 |
| 12 March 1996 | Torquay United (A) | 0–0 | | 2,406 |
| 16 March 1996 | Mansfield Town (A) | 1–0 | Gayle | 2,698 |
| 23 March 1996 | Leyton Orient (H) | 1–1 | Gayle | 8,004 |
| 30 March 1996 | Rochdale (A) | 0–2 | | 2,098 |
| 2 April 1996 | Darlington (H) | 0–0 | | 6,419 |
| 6 April 1996 | Hartlepool United (H) | 2–0 | T.Butler, Bailey | 6,263 |
| 8 April 1996 | Doncaster Rovers (A) | 1–0 | Bailey | 1,783 |
| 13 April 1996 | Exeter City (H) | 1–0 | Puttnam | 7,692 |
| 16 April 1996 | Colchester United (A) | 1–1 | Gayle | 4,953 |
| 20 April 1996 | Northampton Town (A) | 1–1 | Fortune-West | 7,427 |
| 27 April 1996 | Fulham (A) | 0–0 | | 10,320 |
| 4 May 1996 | Scarborough (H) | 1–0 | Fortune-West | 10,420 |

=== Partial league table ===
Football League Third Division final table, leading positions
| Pos | Team | Pld | W | D | L | GF | GA | GD | Pts | Promotion or relegation |
|---|---|---|---|---|---|---|---|---|---|---|
| 1 | Preston North End | 46 | 23 | 17 | 6 | 78 | 38 | +40 | 86 | Division Champions, promoted |
| 2 | Gillingham | 46 | 22 | 17 | 7 | 49 | 20 | +29 | 83 | Promoted |
| 3 | Bury | 46 | 22 | 13 | 11 | 66 | 48 | +18 | 79 | Promoted |
| 4 | Plymouth Argyle | 46 | 22 | 12 | 12 | 68 | 49 | +19 | 78 | Participated in play-offs |
| 5 | Darlington | 46 | 20 | 18 | 8 | 60 | 42 | +18 | 78 | Participated in play-offs |
| 6 | Hereford United | 46 | 20 | 14 | 12 | 65 | 47 | +18 | 74 | Participated in play-offs |
| 7 | Colchester United | 46 | 18 | 18 | 10 | 61 | 51 | +10 | 72 | Participated in play-offs |

== Cup matches ==
=== FA Cup ===
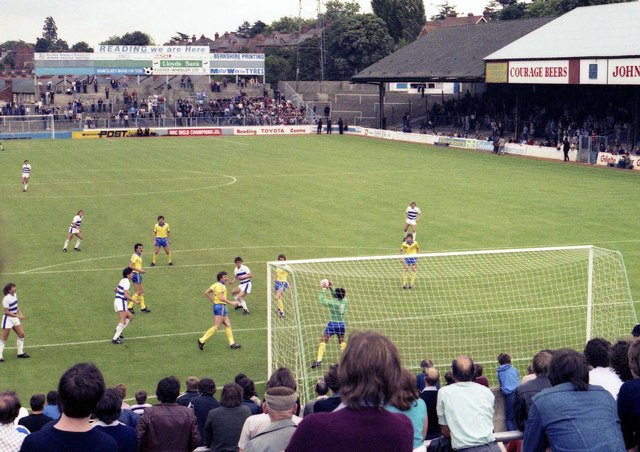
Gillingham were eliminated from the FA Cup at Elm Park, home of Reading.

As a Third Division team, Gillingham entered the 1995–96 FA Cup in the first round and were drawn to play away to Wycombe Wanderers of the Second Division. Bailey scored as Gillingham held their higher-division opponents to a draw, meaning that a replay was required. Gillingham won the replay 1–0 when veteran Wycombe defender Terry Howard scored an own goal. In the second round, Gillingham played semi-professional club Hitchin Town of the Isthmian League and won 3–0. The Premier League and Football League First Division teams entered the competition in the third round and Gillingham were paired with Reading of the First Division. Although Martin scored a goal to give Gillingham the lead at half time, Reading scored three times after the break to eliminate Gillingham from the competition. Gillingham finished the game with nine players after both Neil Smith and Martin were sent off and Pulis was also ejected from the technical area for arguing with the referee.

==== Match details ====
Key

- In result column, Gillingham's score shown first
- H = Home match
- A = Away match
- pen. = Penalty kick
- o.g. = Own goal

Results

| Date | Round | Opponents | Result | Goalscorers | Attendance |
|---|---|---|---|---|---|
| 13 November 1995 | First | Wycombe Wanderers (A) | 1–1 | Bailey | 5,064 |
| 21 November 1995 | First (replay) | Wycombe Wanderers (H) | 1–0 | Howard (o.g.) | 8,585 |
| 2 December 1995 | Second | Hitchin Town (H) | 3–0 | Fortune-West (2), Ratcliffe | 7,142 |
| 6 January 1996 | Third | Reading (A) | 1–3 | Martin | 10,324 |

=== Football League Cup ===
Gillingham entered the 1995–96 Football League Cup in the first round and were drawn against Bristol Rovers of the Second Division. The first round was played over two legs, with the first taking place at Priestfield. Naylor scored his first of only two goals for the club as Gillingham held their higher-level opponents to a 1–1 draw. Bristol Rovers won the second leg 4–2, however, meaning that Gillingham were eliminated from the competition, losing 5–3 on aggregate.

==== Match details ====
Key

- In result column, Gillingham's score shown first
- H = Home match
- A = Away match
- pen. = Penalty kick
- o.g. = Own goal

Results

| Date | Round | Opponents | Result | Goalscorers | Attendance |
|---|---|---|---|---|---|
| 15 August 1995 | First (first leg) | Bristol Rovers (H) | 1–1 | Naylor | 3,827 |
| 23 August 1995 | First (second leg) | Bristol Rovers (A) | 2–4 | Bailey, Fortune-West | 3,601 |

=== Football League Trophy ===
The 1995–96 Football League Trophy, a tournament exclusively for Second and Third Division teams, began with a preliminary round in which the teams were drawn into groups of three, contested on a round-robin basis. Gillingham were grouped with Cardiff City and Hereford United, both of the Third Division. In their first match of the tournament, Gillingham lost 3–2 to Cardiff. As Cardiff had already drawn with Hereford, they were now guaranteed to top the group and progress to the next round and Gillingham needed to beat Hereford to finish second and join them. A 2–2 draw, however, meant that Gillingham's participation in the competition ended at the earliest stage. The game drew a crowd of 1,866, the lowest attendance at Priestfield during the season.

==== Match details ====
Key

- In result column, Gillingham's score shown first
- H = Home match
- A = Away match
- pen. = Penalty kick
- o.g. = Own goal

Results

| Date | Round | Opponents | Result | Goalscorers | Attendance |
|---|---|---|---|---|---|
| 17 October 1995 | Preliminary (southern section) | Cardiff City (A) | 2–3 | Freeman, Foster | 1,034 |
| 7 November 1995 | Preliminary (southern section) | Hereford United (H) | 2–2 | T.Butler, Foster | 1,866 |

== Players ==
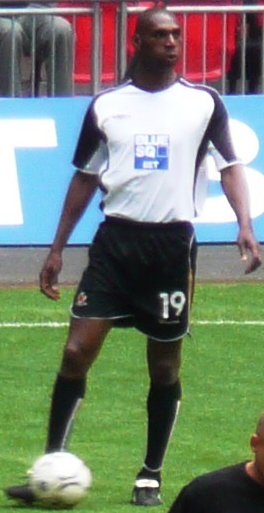
Leo Fortune-West (pictured in 2008) was the team's top scorer.

Stannard made the most appearances of any Gillingham player during the season; he played in 53 of the team's 54 matches, missing only one game in the Football League Trophy. In his 46 Third Division appearances, he kept 29 clean sheets and conceded only 20 goals, both new Football League records for a 46-match season. At the end of the season, he was elected by his fellow professionals into the PFA Team of the Year for the Third Division. No other player played in every league game; Bailey came closest, playing 45 times, followed by Harris with 44. Three players played in only one match during the season: Steve Brown, Alan Nicholls and Kevin Bremner. Brown, who had only joined the club in March 1995 but did not figure in Pulis' plans once he took over as manager, left the club early in October to join Lincoln City. Nicholls joined the club on a one-month contract to serve as cover for Stannard and played once in the League Trophy. His one-month contract was not extended and he joined non-League club Stalybridge Celtic but was killed in a motorcycle accident on 25 November. Bremner, the coach of the club's youth team, played as a substitute in a League Trophy match; it was his only appearance for Gillingham. Fortune-West was the team's top goalscorer; he scored 12 goals in Third Division matches, 2 in the FA Cup and 1 in the League Cup for a total of 15 goals. Bailey was the only other player to reach double figures, scoring 10 goals. Chairman Scally registered himself as a player towards the end of the season in the hope that, if the club had already secured promotion, he would be able to play in the final game and thereby win a bet with friends, but Pulis refused to select him.

Player statistics
| Player | Position | Third Division | | FA Cup | | League Cup | | League Trophy | | Total | |
| Player | Position | Apps | Goals | Apps | Goals | Apps | Goals | Apps | Goals | Apps | Goals |
|---|---|---|---|---|---|---|---|---|---|---|---|
| Andy Ansah | MF | 2 | 0 | 0 | 0 | 0 | 0 | 0 | 0 | 2 | 0 |
| Andy Arnott | FW | 1 | 0 | 0 | 0 | 0 | 0 | 1 | 0 | 2 | 0 |
| Dennis Bailey | FW | 45 | 8 | 4 | 1 | 2 | 1 | 0 | 0 | 51 | 10 |
| Kevin Bremner | FW | 0 | 0 | 0 | 0 | 0 | 0 | 1 | 0 | 1 | 0 |
| Steve Brown | FW | 1 | 0 | 0 | 0 | 0 | 0 | 0 | 0 | 1 | 0 |
| Steve Butler | FW | 20 | 5 | 0 | 0 | 0 | 0 | 0 | 0 | 20 | 5 |
| Tony Butler | DF | 36 | 2 | 2 | 2 | 2 | 2 | 2 | 1 | 42 | 7 |
| Richard Carpenter | MF | 12 | 0 | 1 | 0 | 0 | 0 | 2 | 0 | 15 | 0 |
| Steve Castle | MF | 6 | 1 | 0 | 0 | 0 | 0 | 0 | 0 | 6 | 1 |
| Joe Dunne | DF | 2 | 0 | 1 | 0 | 1 | 0 | 2 | 0 | 6 | 0 |
| Leo Fortune-West | FW | 40 | 12 | 3 | 2 | 2 | 1 | 0 | 0 | 45 | 15 |
| Adrian Foster | FW | 11 | 1 | 0 | 0 | 2 | 0 | 2 | 2 | 15 | 3 |
| Darren Freeman | FW | 9 | 0 | 1 | 0 | 0 | 0 | 2 | 1 | 12 | 1 |
| John Gayle | FW | 9 | 3 | 0 | 0 | 0 | 0 | 0 | 0 | 9 | 3 |
| Richard Green | DF | 35 | 2 | 4 | 0 | 2 | 0 | 2 | 0 | 43 | 2 |
| Mark Harris | DF | 44 | 2 | 4 | 0 | 2 | 0 | 0 | 0 | 50 | 2 |
| Billy Manuel | MF | 10 | 0 | 0 | 0 | 0 | 0 | 0 | 0 | 10 | 0 |
| Dave Martin | MF | 31 | 1 | 4 | 1 | 1 | 0 | 1 | 0 | 37 | 2 |
| Gary Micklewhite | DF | 31 | 0 | 4 | 0 | 0 | 0 | 2 | 0 | 37 | 0 |
| Dominic Naylor | DF | 31 | 1 | 3 | 0 | 2 | 1 | 1 | 0 | 37 | 2 |
| Alan Nicholls | GK | 0 | 0 | 0 | 0 | 0 | 0 | 1 | 0 | 1 | 0 |
| Mark O'Connor | MF | 18 | 1 | 2 | 0 | 2 | 0 | 0 | 0 | 22 | 1 |
| Dave Puttnam | FW | 26 | 1 | 3 | 0 | 0 | 0 | 1 | 0 | 30 | 1 |
| Simon Ratcliffe | MF | 41 | 3 | 3 | 1 | 2 | 0 | 0 | 0 | 46 | 4 |
| Kevin Rattray | MF | 26 | 3 | 2 | 0 | 1 | 0 | 2 | 0 | 31 | 3 |
| Neil Smith | MF | 37 | 1 | 4 | 0 | 1 | 0 | 1 | 0 | 43 | 1 |
| Jim Stannard | GK | 46 | 0 | 4 | 0 | 2 | 0 | 1 | 0 | 53 | 0 |
| Glen Thomas | DF | 15 | 0 | 0 | 0 | 0 | 0 | 0 | 0 | 15 | 0 |
| Alex Watson | DF | 10 | 1 | 0 | 0 | 0 | 0 | 0 | 0 | 10 | 1 |
| Paul Watson | DF | 8 | 0 | 2 | 0 | 0 | 0 | 2 | 0 | 12 | 0 |

FW = Forward, MF = Midfielder, GK = Goalkeeper, DF = Defender

== Aftermath ==
The club's players and officials celebrated promotion with an open-top bus parade through the streets of Rochester, Chatham, and Gillingham. Following promotion, Pulis again overhauled his squad ahead of the upcoming season in the Second Division, and several players who had played significant roles in the 1995–96 season moved on. Martin, who had captained the team to promotion, and Naylor both left the club after a single season and joined Leyton Orient. Gary Micklewhite, one of the few players to have been with the club before Pulis' arrival and to have remained a regular in the team during the 1995–96 season, retired from professional football and joined non-League club Slough Town. Gillingham signed a number of new players, including spending a new club record fee to sign Watford's Andy Hessenthaler, who would go on to have a long association with the club as player and subsequently manager. In the 1996–97 season, the team secured a mid-table finish in their first season at the higher level, finishing 11th in the Second Division.
