= 1994–95 Gillingham F.C. season =

English football club season

Gillingham
1994–95 season
- Chairman: Bernard Baker (until 30 March)
- Manager: Mike Flanagan (until 28 February); Neil Smillie (from 28 February)
- Third Division: 19th
- FA Cup: Third round
- League Cup: First round
- League Trophy: Second round
- Top goalscorer: League: Chris Pike (13); All: Chris Pike (18)
- Highest home attendance: 10,425 vs Sheffield Wednesday (7 January 1995)
- Lowest home attendance: 963 vs Brighton & Hove Albion (27 September 1994)
Home colours	Away colours

During the 1994–95 English football season, Gillingham F.C. competed in the Football League Third Division, the fourth tier of the English football league system. It was the 63rd season in which Gillingham competed in the Football League, and the 45th since the club was voted back into the league in 1950. In January 1995, after several seasons spent near the bottom of the Football League and nearly a decade of financial difficulties, the club was declared insolvent and placed in receivership. Mike Flanagan was made redundant as the club's manager and replaced by player-coach Neil Smillie for the remainder of the season. Gillingham finished the season 19th in the Third Division, but the club's continued existence remained in doubt until June, when it was purchased by businessman Paul Scally.

In addition to the Football League, Gillingham competed in three knock-out competitions. The team reached the third round of the FA Cup, at which stage they lost to Sheffield Wednesday of the FA Premier League, and the second round of the Football League Trophy, but were eliminated at the earliest stage of the Football League Cup. Gillingham played a total of 50 competitive matches, winning 12, drawing 12, and losing 26. Chris Pike was the team's leading goalscorer with 18 goals. Paul Watson made the most appearances, playing 47 times. The highest attendance recorded at the club's home ground, Priestfield Stadium, was 10,425, for the FA Cup game against Sheffield Wednesday. The lowest attendance was 963, for a Football League Trophy game against Brighton & Hove Albion, which was the smallest crowd recorded for a competitive match at Priestfield for more than 20 years.

== Background and pre-season ==
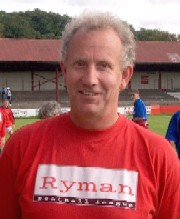
The club staged a testimonial match for former long-serving player Ron Hillyard (pictured in 2001).

The 1994–95 season was Gillingham's 63rd season playing in the Football League and the 45th since the club was elected back into the League in 1950 after being voted out in 1938. It was the club's sixth consecutive season in the English football league system's fourth tier, which had been named the Football League Third Division since 1992. Since being relegated to the fourth tier in 1989, Gillingham had only once finished in the top half of the league table, with a low point in the 1992–93 season when the team finished 21st out of 22 teams and narrowly avoided being relegated into non-League football. In the 1993–94 season, Gillingham had finished 16th.

At the start of the 1994–95 season, Mike Flanagan was the club's manager, a position he had held since the summer of 1993. He was assisted by Neil Smillie, who held the position of player-coach. Adrian Foster, a forward, was the only new player to join the club before the start of the season, arriving from Torquay United for a transfer fee of £60,000 (equivalent to £150,000 in 2023). Gillingham lost their top goalscorer of the previous season, however, as Nicky Forster rejected the offer of a new contract and left to join Brentford of the Second Division, for which Gillingham received a fee of £320,000 (equivalent to £800,000 in 2023).

The team prepared for the new season with a number of friendly matches, including a testimonial match for Ron Hillyard, who played for the club from 1974 until 1990, and a match to mark the club's centenary, which had been celebrated during the preceding season. Arsenal of the FA Premier League provided the opposition for the centenary match; the same club, then known as Woolwich Arsenal, had been the opposition in the first match contested by Gillingham, then known as New Brompton, in 1893. The previous season's kit was retained for a further year. It had been designed to mark the club's centenary and added panels of black and white stripes to the usual blue shirts, which were worn with white shorts and socks; the club's original shirts when it was founded in 1893 featured black and white stripes. The away kit, to be worn in the event of a clash of colours with the home team, was all red with similar black and white panels on the shirts.

== Third Division ==
=== August–December ===
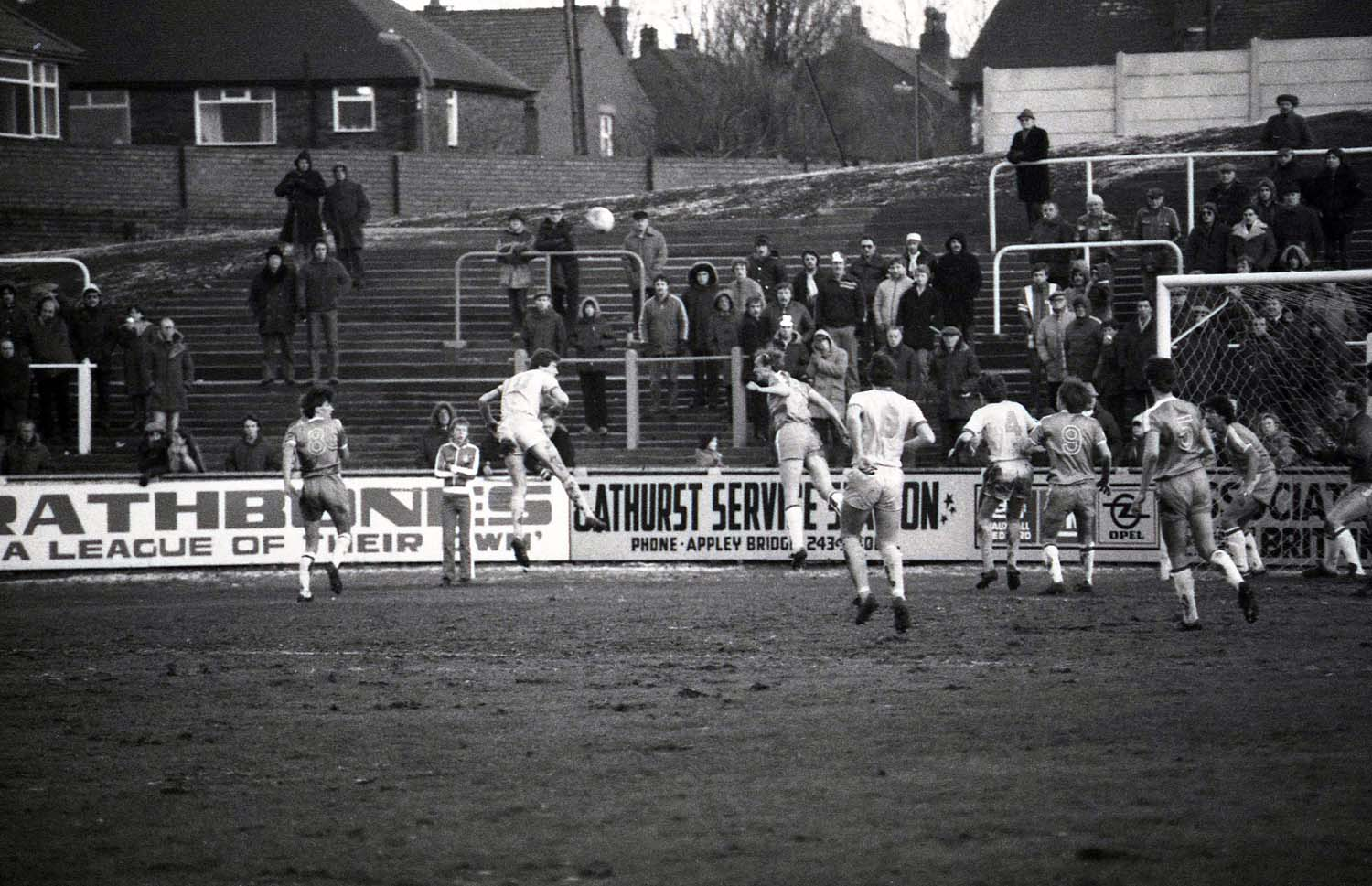
Gillingham won their first away game of the season at Wigan Athletic's Springfield Park (pictured c. 1982), but did not win another Third Division match away from home in 1994.

Gillingham's first match was at home to Hartlepool United and resulted in a goalless draw. Foster made his debut, but had to be substituted after injuring his ankle. Although he was able to continue playing for two weeks, the injury then recurred and kept him out of the team until November. He scored his first goal for the team in the second league match of the season, a 3–0 victory away to Wigan Athletic; this was Gillingham's biggest win away from home for more than three years. The team extended their unbeaten run from the start of the season to three games with a 1–1 draw at home to Rochdale but then lost away games against Scunthorpe United and Exeter City. In Foster's absence, Andy Arnott was brought into the starting line-up against Scunthorpe for the first time since the opening game of the season. Neither he nor fellow forward Paul Baker were able to score against Scunthorpe or Exeter, however, and Gillingham lost both games 3–0. In response to the lack of goals, Flanagan signed Scottish forward Paul Ritchie on loan from Dundee. It was the second loan spell at Priestfield Stadium for Ritchie, who had played six Third Division games for Gillingham in 1993. He scored on his second debut for Gillingham to help the team to a 3–1 win at home to Scarborough on 10 September.

Gillingham then began a run of consecutive defeats, losing at home to Preston North End and away to Hartlepool and Walsall. With Foster still out of action and Ritchie due to return to Dundee, Flanagan signed experienced Welsh forward Chris Pike from Hereford United for £15,000 (equivalent to £40,000 in 2023); he made his debut on 1 October at home to Mansfield Town. The match resulted in a fourth consecutive league defeat, leaving Gillingham 20th in the table, only two places off the bottom of the entire Football League. A week later, Pike scored his first goal at home to Torquay United as Gillingham won 1–0 to end the run of defeats. He scored four more goals in the next four games, which resulted in two defeats, one win, and one draw, after which Gillingham had risen to 17th in the table.

Gillingham extended their unbeaten league run to four games with two more draws in the last two games of November, but then began December with consecutive defeats at home to Wigan Athletic and away to Rochdale. Paul Watson, the only player to have played in every game up to this point in the season, was sent off in the defeat to Wigan. Foster scored his first goal since August against Rochdale. Gillingham ended the year by playing three games in six days. On Boxing Day the team won 4–1 at home to Fulham, the first time Gillingham had scored four goals in a game for nearly two years. The attendance of 4,737 would prove to be the largest of the season for a Third Division game at Priestfield. The following day Gillingham lost 1–0 away to Barnet. The team's final match of 1994 was a 1–0 defeat at home to Carlisle United on New Year's Eve; Gillingham finished the year 18th in the table. Although the team had only lost 3 of 10 league games at Priestfield up to this point in the season, their league position suffered from the fact that they had only won once and drawn twice in 11 games on their opponents' grounds, the worst away record in the division.

=== January–May ===
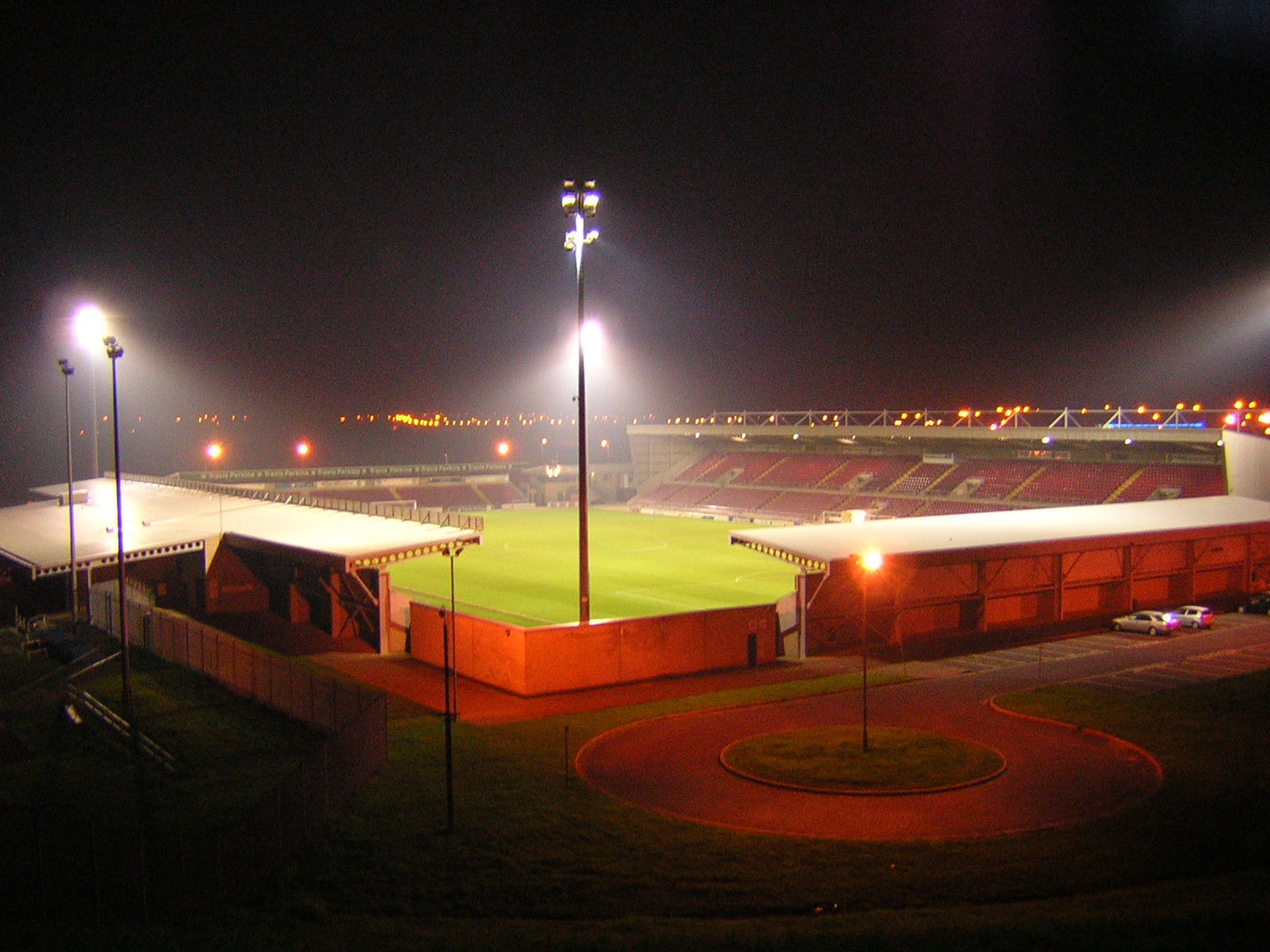
Gillingham's first league match of 1995 took place at Northampton Town's Sixfields Stadium.

On 9 January, after nearly a decade of financial difficulties and with debts estimated at £2 million (equivalent to £4.9 million in 2023), the club was declared insolvent and placed in receivership. Administrators from accountants Kidsons Impey took over the day-to-day running of the club while searching for a buyer. The first game after this announcement was away to Northampton Town and resulted in a 2–0 defeat for Gillingham, the team's third consecutive league defeat. The next game, which did not take place until 4 February due to the postponement of two scheduled matches, was a goalless draw at home to Lincoln City, the fourth consecutive league game in which the team had failed to score; the result meant that Gillingham had again slipped to 20th in the table. The team ended the goalless run with a 2–1 victory away to Doncaster Rovers in the first game of February, Pike scoring twice. It was the first time Gillingham had won away from home in the Third Division since August. The team's form away from home remained poor, however; they played three further away matches during February, against Chesterfield, Darlington and Mansfield Town, and lost all three without scoring a goal.

On 28 February, three days after Gillingham lost to Mansfield, the administrators made Flanagan redundant as a cost-saving measure; Smillie was appointed player-manager for the remainder of the season. His first game in charge resulted in a 3–1 defeat at home to Walsall. Following this game, however, Gillingham did not lose for five games, their longest unbeaten run of the season. The sequence began with a 0–0 draw away to Scarborough, only the second time in the last eight away games that Gillingham had not lost, and continued with a 2–2 draw at home to Scunthorpe United. Gillingham then won 3–0 at home to Exeter City, another team struggling near the foot of the division, before achieving draws away to Preston North End and at home to Bury. In the game at Preston, defender Joe Dunne scored his only goal in over 130 games played for Gillingham between 1990 and 1996. Steve Brown, newly signed from Colchester United in a player exchange deal under which Robbie Reinelt was transferred in the opposite direction, made his debut against Bury in place of Pike and scored Gillingham's goal; Brown would start every game for the remainder of the season, paired with either Foster or Pike. The unbeaten run ended with a defeat away to Carlisle United, which was followed three days later by another at home to Colchester.

Gillingham beat Barnet 2–1 at Priestfield on 15 April to climb slightly to 18th in the table, but two days later lost 1–0 away to Fulham. On 22 April, Pike achieved the team's only hat-trick of the season, scoring three times in a 4–2 win over Doncaster Rovers. The final home game of the season was a goalless draw with Hereford United; at the end of the game the Gillingham fans invaded the pitch to mark what many believed could be the last game ever played at Priestfield due to the club's still-unresolved financial issues. Gillingham's last game of the season was away to Torquay United and resulted in a 3–1 defeat, which meant that Gillingham finished 19th in the 22-team Third Division. Even if they had finished bottom (which would normally have resulted in relegation into non-League football) they would have retained their League status as Macclesfield Town, who won the fifth-tier Football Conference, were ineligible for promotion because their stadium did not meet the required standard.

=== Match details ===
Key

- In result column, Gillingham's score shown first
- H = Home match
- A = Away match
- pen. = Penalty kick
- o.g. = Own goal

Results
Date	Opponents	Result	Goalscorers	Attendance
13 August 1994	Hartlepool United (H)	0–0		2,959
20 August 1994	Wigan Athletic (A)	3–0	Foster, Reinelt, Watson	1,514
27 August 1994	Rochdale (H)	1–1	Butler	3,009
30 August 1994	Scunthorpe United (A)	0–3		2,098
3 September 1994	Exeter City (A)	0–3		2,241
10 September 1994	Scarborough (H)	3–1	Palmer, Ritchie, Baker	2,438
13 September 1994	Preston North End (H)	2–3	Smith, Baker	2,653
17 September 1994	Hartlepool United (A)	0–2		1,756
24 September 1994	Walsall (A)	1–2	Micklewhite	3,654
1 October 1994	Mansfield Town (H)	0–2		2,569
8 October 1994	Torquay United (H)	1–0	Pike	2,450
15 October 1994	Hereford United (A)	1–2	Arnott	2,470
22 October 1994	Bury (A)	2–3	Pike (2, 1 pen.)	2,976
29 October 1994	Darlington (H)	2–1	Pike, Smillie	2,841
5 November 1994	Colchester United (A)	2–2	Reinelt, Pike	3,817
19 November 1994	Chesterfield (H)	1–1	Reinelt	2,730
26 November 1994	Lincoln City (A)	1–1	Arnott	2,919
10 December 1994	Wigan Athletic (H)	0–1		2,257
17 December 1994	Rochdale (A)	1–2	Foster	1,665
26 December 1994	Fulham (H)	4–1	Reinelt, Micklewhite, Foster (2)	4,737
27 December 1994	Barnet (A)	0–1		2,074
31 December 1994	Carlisle United (H)	0–1		3,709
14 January 1995	Northampton Town (A)	0–2		5,529
4 February 1995	Lincoln City (H)	0–0		4,191
7 February 1995	Doncaster Rovers (A)	2–1	Pike (2)	1,740
11 February 1995	Chesterfield (A)	0–2		3,070
18 February 1995	Northampton Town (H)	3–1	Ramage, Green, Foster	4,072
21 February 1995	Darlington (A)	0–2		1,548
25 February 1995	Mansfield Town (A)	0–4		3,182
4 March 1995	Walsall (H)	1–3	Foster	3,757
11 March 1995	Scarborough (A)	0–0		1,949
18 March 1995	Scunthorpe United (H)	2–2	Foster, Pike	2,501
25 March 1995	Exeter City (H)	3–0	Foster, Pike (pen.), Butler	3,364
1 April 1995	Preston North End (A)	1–1	Dunne	9,095
4 April 1995	Bury (H)	1–1	Brown	2,957
8 April 1995	Carlisle United (A)	0–2		6,786
11 April 1995	Colchester United (H)	1–3	Watson	3,404
15 April 1995	Barnet (H)	2–1	Brown, Pike	3,457
17 April 1995	Fulham (A)	0–1		3,612
22 April 1995	Doncaster Rovers (H)	4–2	Kirby (o.g.), Pike (3)	3,069
29 April 1995	Hereford United (H)	0–0		4,200
6 May 1995	Torquay United (A)	1–3	Stamps (o.g.)	2,638

=== Partial league table ===
Football League Third Division final table, bottom positions
Pos	Team	Pld	W	D	L	GF	GA	GD	Pts
17	Northampton Town	42	10	14	18	45	67	−22	44
18	Hartlepool United	42	11	10	21	43	69	−26	43
19	Gillingham	42	10	11	21	46	64	−18	41
20	Darlington	42	11	8	23	43	57	−14	41
21	Scarborough	42	8	10	24	49	70	−21	34
22	Exeter City	42	8	10	24	36	70	−34	34

== Cup matches ==
=== FA Cup ===
As a Third Division team, Gillingham entered the 1994–95 FA Cup in the first round and were paired with Heybridge Swifts of the Isthmian League First Division, three levels lower in the English football league system. Heybridge had progressed through five qualifying rounds to reach this stage of the competition for the first time. Due to Heybridge's stadium failing to meet the requirements for this stage of the competition, the match was played at Colchester United's Layer Road ground. Gillingham defeated their semi-professional opponents 2–0. In the second round, they played fellow Third Division team Fulham at Priestfield; the initial match finished 1–1, necessitating a replay at Fulham's Craven Cottage stadium. The replay also finished 1–1 but the rules of the competition meant that on this occasion extra time was played; Reinelt scored the winning goal during the extra period. In the third round, Gillingham played Sheffield Wednesday of the Premier League; the match drew a crowd of 10,425, the largest attendance recorded at Priestfield since 1987. Sheffield Wednesday took a 2–0 lead in the first half and, despite having their starting goalkeeper, Kevin Pressman, sent off and Pike scoring from a penalty kick, the Premier League team held on for a 2–1 victory. David Hunn of the Sunday Times wrote that Gillingham "dashed incessantly at their mighty but depleted visitors" and "went hell for leather for the equaliser" but were thwarted by substitute goalkeeper Lance Key.

==== Match details ====
Key

- In result column, Gillingham's score shown first
- H = Home match
- A = Away match
- pen. = Penalty kick
- o.g. = Own goal

Results
Date	Round	Opponents	Result	Goalscorers	Attendance
11 November 1994	First	Heybridge Swifts (A)^{[a]}	2–0	Reinelt, Pike	4,614
3 December 1994	Second	Fulham (H)	1–1	Pike	6,253
13 December 1994	Second (replay)	Fulham (A)	2–1	Pike, Reinelt	6,536
7 January 1995	Third	Sheffield Wednesday (H)	1–2	Pike (pen.)	10,425

a. The match was played at Colchester United's Layer Road ground, but remained officially a home game for Heybridge rather than being considered to have taken place at a neutral venue.

=== Football League Cup ===
As a Third Division team, Gillingham entered the 1994–95 Football League Cup in the first round and were paired with Reading of the Football League First Division, the second tier of English football. Gillingham lost the first leg of the two-legged tie 1–0 and the second 3–0 and were eliminated from the competition by an aggregate score of 4–0.

==== Match details ====
Key

- In result column, Gillingham's score shown first
- H = Home match
- A = Away match
- pen. = Penalty kick
- o.g. = Own goal

Results
Date	Round	Opponents	Result	Goalscorers	Attendance
16 August 1994	First (first leg)	Reading (H)	0–1		2,556
23 August 1994	First (second leg)	Reading (A)	0–3		3,436

=== Football League Trophy ===
The 1994–95 Football League Trophy, a tournament exclusively for Second and Third Division teams, began with a round in which the teams were drawn into groups of three, contested on a round-robin basis. Gillingham were grouped with Brentford and Brighton & Hove Albion, both of the Second Division. Gillingham's first match was at home to Brighton and resulted in a 1–1 draw; the game drew an attendance of only 963, the lowest crowd for a competitive match at Priestfield since 1973. Gillingham's second group match was away to Brentford, who had already won their match against Brighton to top the group with maximum points from their two games. Gillingham lost 3–1 and finished the group stage with one point, the same as Brighton, but Pike's goal meant that his team finished second and qualified for the next round as they had scored more goals in total than Brighton. Gillingham's opponents in the second round were Birmingham City, another Second Division team. The game was played at Birmingham's St Andrew's stadium and drew a crowd of 17,028, by far the largest attendance for a match involving Gillingham during the season. Birmingham won 3–0 to eliminate Gillingham from the competition.

==== Match details ====
Key

- In result column, Gillingham's score shown first
- H = Home match
- A = Away match
- pen. = Penalty kick
- o.g. = Own goal

Results
Date	Round	Opponents	Result	Goalscorers	Attendance
27 September 1994	First (group)	Brighton & Hove Albion (H)	1–1	Carpenter	963
8 November 1994	First (group)	Brentford (A)	1–3	Pike	1,795
29 November 1994	Second	Birmingham City (A)	0–3		17,028

== Player details ==
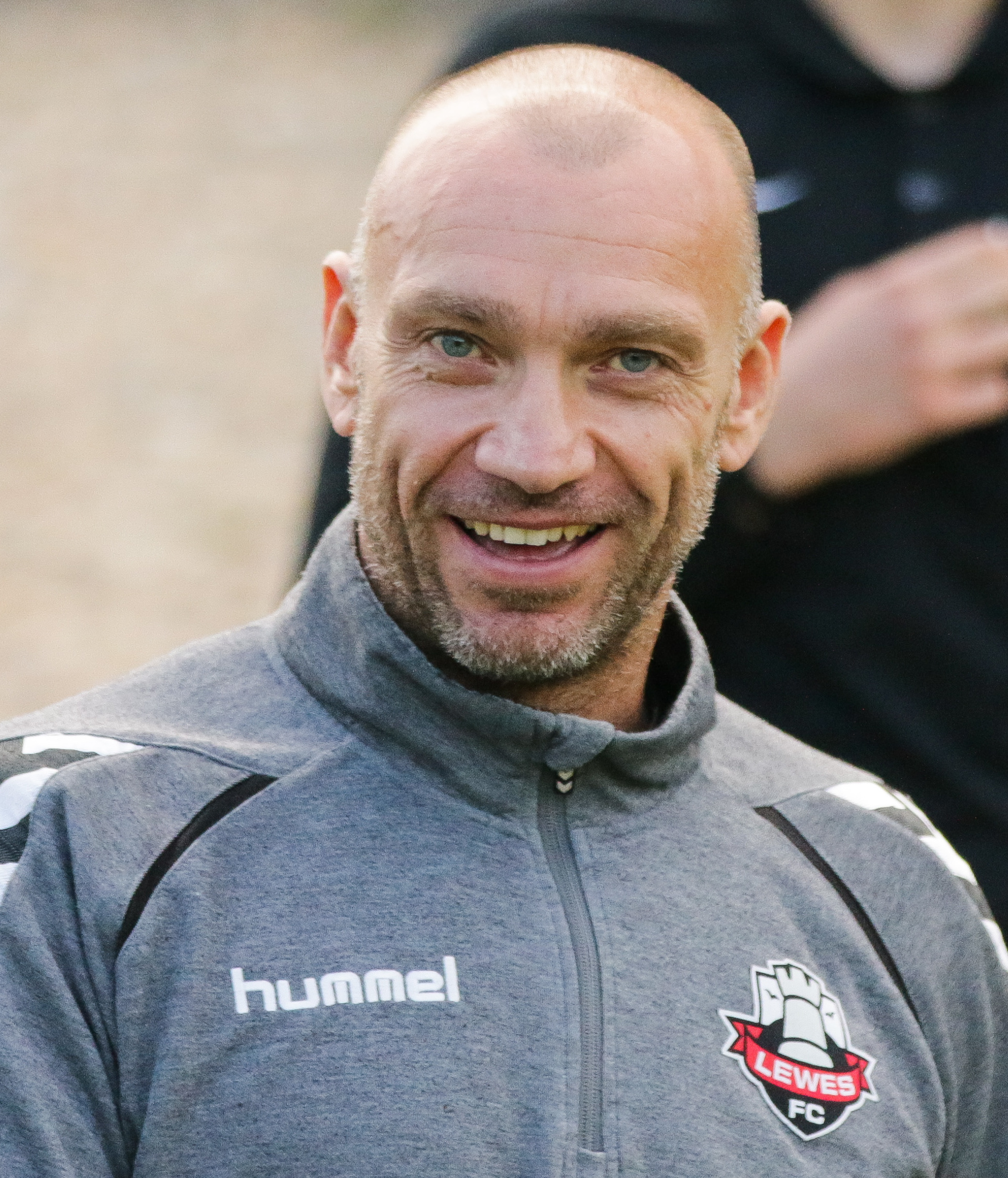
Darren Freeman (pictured in 2017) made his debut for the club in March.

During the course of the season, 31 players played for Gillingham in competitive matches. Watson made the most appearances, playing in 47 of the team's 50 games. He missed the final three Third Division matches of 1994, but played in every other league game as well as every game in the FA Cup, League Cup, and League Trophy. Four other players made over 40 appearances: Richard Green (44), Steve Banks and Gary Micklewhite (both 43), and Tony Butler (40). In contrast, both Jon Hooker and Abdul Kamara played only in one League Trophy match; in both cases it was the only appearance the player ever made for Gillingham.

Seventeen players scored at least one goal for Gillingham during the season. Pike was the top scorer with 13 goals in the Third Division and 18 in total. Foster was the only other player to reach double figures, scoring 8 goals in Third Division matches and 10 in total.

Player statistics
Player	Position	Third Division		FA Cup		League Cup		League Trophy		Total	
Player	Position	Apps	Goals	Apps	Goals	Apps	Goals	Apps	Goals	Apps	Goals
Andy Arnott	FW	28	2	4	0	2	0	2	0	36	2
Paul Baker	FW	8	2	0	0	2	0	0	0	10	2
Steve Banks	GK	38	0	4	0	0	0	1	0	43	0
Scott Barrett	GK	4	0	0	0	2	0	2	0	8	0
Mick Bodley	DF	7	0	0	0	0	0	1	0	8	0
Steve Brown	FW	8	2	0	0	0	0	0	0	8	2
Tony Butler	DF	33	2	3	0	2	0	2	0	40	2
Richard Carpenter	MF	29	0	4	0	0	0	2	1	35	1
Joe Dunne	DF	35	1	1	0	2	0	1	0	39	1
Adrian Foster	FW	29	8	3	0	2	0	1	2	35	10
Darren Freeman	FW	2	0	0	0	0	0	0	0	2	0
Richard Green	DF	37	1	4	0	2	0	1	0	44	1
Jon Hooker	FW	0	0	0	0	0	0	1	0	1	0
Ian Hutchinson	MF	5	0	0	0	0	0	2	0	7	0
Abdul Kamara	FW	0	0	0	0	0	0	1	0	1	0
Andy Kennedy	FW	2	0	0	0	0	0	0	0	2	0
Gareth Knott	MF	5	0	0	0	0	0	0	0	5	0
Scott Lindsey	MF	12	0	0	0	0	0	1	0	13	0
Eliot Martin	DF	7	0	0	0	0	0	0	0	7	0
Gary Micklewhite	MF	35	2	4	0	2	0	2	0	43	2
Lee Palmer	DF	10	1	0	0	2	0	2	0	14	1
Chris Pike	FW	27	13	4	4	0	0	2	1	33	18
Andy Ramage	MF	13	1	0	0	0	0	2	0	15	1
Robbie Reinelt	FW	27	4	4	2	2	0	3	0	36	6
Paul Ritchie	FW	5	1	0	0	0	0	1	0	6	1
Neil Smillie	MF	15	1	3	0	0	0	1	0	19	1
Neil Smith	MF	33	1	3	0	2	0	1	0	39	1
Robin Trott	DF	9	0	0	0	0	0	1	0	10	0
Paul Watson	DF	39	2	4	0	2	0	2	0	47	2
Grant Watts	FW	3	0	0	0	0	0	1	0	4	0
Paul Wilson	FW	2	0	0	0	0	0	0	0	2	0

FW = Forward, MF = Midfielder, GK = Goalkeeper, DF = Defender

== Aftermath ==
At the end of the 1994–95 season, with no rescue deal finalised, fans were unsure whether the club would still be in existence to start the next season; one takeover bid had already collapsed when the leader of the consortium resigned after adverse publicity surrounding his financial status. In early June, however, shareholders and creditors voted overwhelmingly to accept a takeover bid from Sevenoaks-based businessman Paul Scally, who paid a nominal fee to purchase the club. The deal was finalised at the end of the month, one day before a deadline imposed on the club by the Football League to be out of receivership or face expulsion, and Scally was officially named as the club's new chairman. Having signed many new players, Gillingham began the 1995–96 season strongly and remained in the top three positions in the Third Division for the entire season, finishing in second place. The club thus gained promotion to the Second Division seven years after being relegated from the third tier.
