= 1996–97 Gillingham F.C. season =

English football club season

Gillingham
1996–97 season
- Chairman: Paul Scally
- Manager: Tony Pulis
- Second Division: 11th
- FA Cup: Third round
- League Cup: Fourth round
- League Trophy: First round
- Top goalscorer: League: Iffy Onuora (21); All: Iffy Onuora (23)
- Highest home attendance: 10,603 vs Coventry City (22 October 1996)
- Lowest home attendance: 1,193 vs Cardiff City (10 December 1996)
Home colours	Away colours

During the 1996–97 English football season, Gillingham F.C. competed in the Football League Second Division, the third tier of the English football league system. It was the 65th season in which Gillingham competed in the Football League, and the 47th since the club was voted back into the league in 1950. In the previous season, the team had gained promotion from the Third Division. Prior to the new season, Gillingham signed seven new players, paying a new club record transfer fee for Watford's Andy Hessenthaler. The team's form was poor in the first half of the season and at the end of 1996, Gillingham were in 21st position in the 24-team league table, putting them in danger of relegation back to the fourth tier. The club signed Ade Akinbiyi from Norwich City for another record fee in early January. In the second half of the season the team's performances improved and they finished the season in 11th position in the table.

Gillingham also competed in three knock-out competitions. The team reached the fourth round of the Football League Cup; in the third round they held Coventry City of the FA Premier League to a draw at home and won the replay. It was the first time Gillingham had beaten a team from the top division of English football since 1908. They also reached the third round of the FA Cup but were eliminated from the Football League Trophy in the first round. The team played 57 competitive matches, winning 25, drawing 12 and losing 20. Simon Ratcliffe made the most appearances during the season, playing 52 times. Iffy Onuora, who joined the club at the start of the season, was top goalscorer, with 21 goals in the Second Division and a total of 23 across all competitions. The highest attendance recorded at the club's home ground, Priestfield Stadium, was 10,603, for the League Cup match against Coventry City.

== Background and pre-season ==
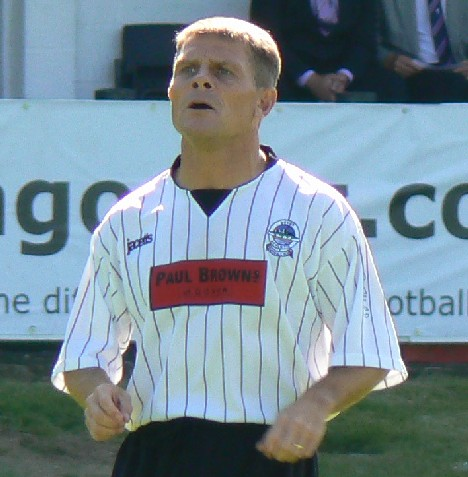
Gillingham paid a new record fee to sign Andy Hessenthaler (pictured in 2007) from Watford.

The 1996–97 season was Gillingham's 65th playing in the Football League and the 47th since the club was elected back into the League in 1950 after being voted out in 1938. In the previous season, Gillingham had finished second in the Third Division. The team had thus been promoted to the Second Division, returning to the third tier of the English football league system for the first time since 1989.

Tony Pulis was the club's manager for a second season, having been appointed in 1995 after chairman Paul Scally purchased the club. Following the club's promotion, there was a significant turnover in the playing squad. A number of players who had been regulars at the lower level departed, including Dave Martin, captain of the promotion-winning team. He was replaced as captain by Andy Hessenthaler, who joined from Watford; the transfer fee for the midfielder was £235,000 (equivalent to £560,000 in 2023), a new record for the highest fee paid by Gillingham to sign a player. Hessenthaler would go on to have a lengthy career at the club, both as a player and a manager, and in 2014 was voted Gillingham's greatest ever player by supporters.

Six other players joined the club prior to the start of the new season, four of whom incurred a transfer fee. The highest fee other than that paid for Hessenthaler was £65,000 (equivalent to £150,000 in 2023) for Lenny Piper, a teenaged midfielder who joined the club from Wimbledon. Matt Bryant and Jon Ford, both defenders, arrived from Bristol City for £60,000 (equivalent to £140,000 in 2023) and Bradford City for £15,000 (equivalent to £40,000 in 2023) respectively, and Iffy Onuora, a forward, joined from Mansfield Town for £12,500 (equivalent to £30,000 in 2023). Two further players, both defenders, arrived on free transfers: Ian Chapman from Brighton & Hove Albion and John Humphrey from Charlton Athletic. The club adopted a new kit, replacing the previous season's blue and black striped shirts with plain blue. The away kit, to be worn in the event of a clash of colours with the home team, was red. The team prepared for the new season with a number of friendly matches; most were against semi-professional non-League clubs, but the team also played Nottingham Forest of the FA Premier League.

== Second Division ==
=== August–December ===
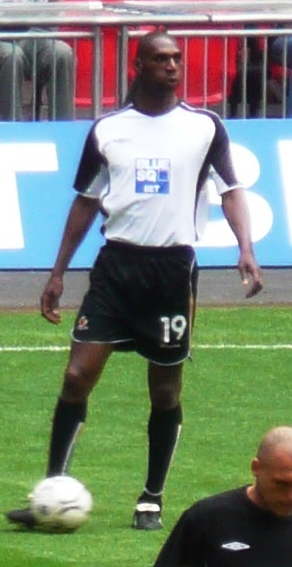
Leo Fortune-West (pictured in 2008), the previous season's leading goalscorer, suffered a serious injury in September.

Gillingham began the season with a home game at Priestfield Stadium against Bristol City. New signings Bryant, Ford, Humphrey, Hessenthaler, Chapman and Onuora were all in the starting line-up, and Piper came on as a substitute to score the winning goal in the final minute to give his team a 3–2 victory. In the next three matches the team only managed to score a single goal, and the month of August ended with two consecutive defeats. Gillingham beat Burnley on 7 September but then again lost twice in a row. In the second of these defeats, a 1–0 away defeat against Walsall, Leo Fortune-West, the previous season's top goalscorer, suffered a broken ankle and was unable to play again for seven months. In the next game, Onuora achieved the team's only hat-trick of the season, scoring all three goals in a 3–1 victory at home to Rotherham United. The forward also scored Gillingham's only goal in each of the next three matches, which produced one win, one draw, and one defeat; after this run Gillingham were 14th in the 24-team league table.

On 15 October, Gillingham defeated Shrewsbury Town 2–1, but then began a run of five league games without a win. With Fortune-West missing, Pulis paired Onuora with various different players in the forward positions. One of these, Steve Butler, scored two penalty kicks against Millwall on 19 October, making him only the fourth player to score from more than one penalty for Gillingham in a Football League match, but Gillingham lost 3–2. Defender Guy Butters, a £225,000 (equivalent to £530,000 in 2023) signing from Portsmouth, made his debut in the draw with Preston North End on 26 October, and Pulis further bolstered his defensive options by signing Adrian Pennock from AFC Bournemouth for £25,000 (equivalent to £60,000 in 2023).

Gillingham ended the winless run with a victory over Peterborough United on 19 November, despite goalkeeper Jim Stannard suffering an injury and defender Mark Harris having to take over in goal. Pulis quickly signed goalkeeper Andy Marshall on loan from Norwich City and he saved a penalty on his debut against York City, but Gillingham lost both that game and the next one, after which they had dropped to 20th in the table. The team began December with a win over Crewe Alexandra and followed the victory with draws against two teams who were in the top six of the league table, Bury and Watford. It was the first time that the team had gone three consecutive league games without losing during the season. This short unbeaten run was followed, however, by a defeat at home to Luton Town on Boxing Day. Gillingham's final match of 1996 was away to Burnley, who won 5–1; Onuora was sent off after receiving a second yellow card for angrily throwing the ball at the assistant referee. The defeat left Gillingham 21st in the table, putting them in the relegation places.

=== January–May ===
Due to the postponement of a number of scheduled matches, the first league game of 1997 did not take place until 18 January and resulted in a 1–1 draw with Notts County. Forward Ade Akinbiyi made his debut, having joined the club days earlier from Norwich City for another new club record fee of £250,000 (equivalent to £590,000 in 2023). He scored his first goal for the club seven days later in a 4–1 victory over Plymouth Argyle, the team's biggest win of the season. Gillingham remained undefeated in the league in 1997 until the end of February, a run of six games. The team followed a win over Bristol Rovers on 8 February with victory over York City, the first time they had won two consecutive league games all season, and then gained a third consecutive win by defeating Peterborough United. After this run, Gillingham had climbed to 15th in the table.

In March, Fortune-West was fit again after his injury but could not regain a place in the team due to the form of Onuora and Akinbiyi and was sent on loan to Leyton Orient of the Third Division. Gillingham began the month with a 3–2 defeat to Crewe Alexandra, the first time the team had lost in the league in 1997, but followed it up by defeating sixth-placed Watford, Butler scoring the winning goal against his former club in the final minute. Beginning with the game against Wycombe Wanderers on 22 March, Onuora scored in five consecutive matches, making him only the seventh player to achieve this feat for Gillingham in the Football League. The first three games of this run resulted in victories over Wycombe, Rotherham and Bristol City. In the next game, against promotion-chasing Brentford, Onuora gave Gillingham the lead but their opponents scored twice to win; Gillingham ended March 15th in the table.

Gillingham's first match of April resulted in a 2–2 draw against Chesterfield; Gillingham were winning until the final minute but then conceded an equalising goal. Seven days later, Gillingham drew 2–2 against AFC Bournemouth in identical circumstances, conceding an equaliser in the 90th minute. Butler scored in both games and also scored in the next two, a victory over Stockport County and a defeat to Blackpool. Gillingham ended the season with three consecutive 2–0 victories, defeating Millwall, Walsall and Shrewsbury. Onuora scored two goals and Akinbiyi three during this run. Gillingham finished the season in 11th place in the table, six points below the promotion play-off places.

=== Match details ===
Key

- In result column, Gillingham's score shown first
- H = Home match
- A = Away match
- pen. = Penalty kick
- o.g. = Own goal

Results

Date	Opponents	Result	Goalscorers	Attendance
17 August 1996	Bristol City (H)	3–2	Fortune-West, Harris, Piper	7,217
24 August 1996	Wycombe Wanderers (A)	1–1	Ratcliffe	4,582
27 August 1996	Brentford (A)	0–2		5,384
31 August 1996	Chesterfield (H)	0–1		5,934
7 September 1996	Burnley (H)	1–0	Fortune-West	6,116
10 September 1996	Luton Town (A)	1–2	Chapman	4,604
14 September 1996	Walsall (A)	0–1		3,419
21 September 1996	Rotherham United (H)	3–1	Onuora (3)	4,920
28 September 1996	Stockport County (A)	1–2	Onuora	6,049
1 October 1996	Notts County (H)	1–0	Onuora	5,482
5 October 1996	AFC Bournemouth (H)	1–1	Onuora	6,162
12 October 1996	Blackpool (A)	0–2		4,320
15 October 1996	Shrewsbury Town (A)	2–1	Onuora, Bailey	2,042
19 October 1996	Millwall (H)	2–3	Butler (2 pens.)	9,305
26 October 1996	Preston North End (H)	1–1	Onuora	6,256
29 October 1996	Plymouth Argyle (A)	0–2		4,787
2 November 1996	Bristol Rovers (A)	0–0		5,530
9 November 1996	Wrexham (H)	1–2	Ratcliffe	5,094
19 November 1996	Peterborough United (A)	1–0	Onuora	4,136
23 November 1996	York City (H)	0–1		5,048
30 November 1996	Preston North End (A)	0–1		9,616
3 December 1996	Crewe Alexandra (H)	2–1	Pennock, Smith	3,575
14 December 1996	Bury (H)	2–2	Butler, Ratcliffe	5,542
21 December 1996	Watford (A)	0–0		7,809
26 December 1996	Luton Town (H)	1–2	Onuora	8,598
28 December 1996	Burnley (A)	1–5	Bailey	10,004
18 January 1997	Notts County (A)	1–1	Puttnam	5,008
25 January 1997	Plymouth Argyle (H)	4–1	Curran (o.g.), Green, Ratcliffe, Akinbiyi	5,465
1 February 1997	Wrexham (A)	1–1	Akinbiyi	3,193
8 February 1997	Bristol Rovers (H)	1–0	Hessenthaler	6,900
15 February 1997	York City (A)	3–2	Onuora, Ratcliffe, Akinbiyi	2,748
22 February 1997	Peterborough United (H)	2–1	Onuora (2)	6,552
1 March 1997	Crewe Alexandra (A)	2–3	Green, Akinbiyi	3,555
8 March 1997	Watford (H)	3–1	Hessenthaler, Onuora (pen.), Butler	7,385
15 March 1997	Bury (A)	0–3		3,492
22 March 1997	Wycombe Wanderers (H)	1–0	Onuora	5,932
25 March 1997	Rotherham United (A)	2–1	Onuora, Ratcliffe	2,664
29 March 1997	Bristol City (A)	1–0	Onuora (pen.)	11,276
31 March 1997	Brentford (H)	1–2	Onuora	7,361
5 April 1997	Chesterfield (A)	2–2	Butler, Onuora	3,926
12 April 1997	AFC Bournemouth (A)	2–2	Butler, Pennock	5,008
16 April 1997	Stockport County (H)	1–0	Butler	4,485
19 April 1997	Blackpool (H)	2–3	Galloway, Butler	5,151
26 April 1997	Millwall (A)	2–0	Akinbiyi, Onuora	8,946
29 April 1997	Walsall (H)	2–0	Onuora, Butler	4,095
3 May 1997	Shrewsbury Town (H)	2–0	Akinbiyi (2)	6,183

=== Partial league table ===
Football League Third Division final table, positions 8–14
Pos	Team	Pld	W	D	L	GF	GA	GD	Pts
8	Wrexham	46	17	18	11	55	50	+5	69
9	Burnley	46	19	11	16	71	55	+16	68
10	Chesterfield	46	18	14	14	42	39	+3	68
11	Gillingham	46	19	10	17	60	59	+1	67
12	Walsall	46	19	10	17	54	53	+1	67
13	Watford	46	16	19	11	45	38	+7	67
14	Millwall	46	16	13	17	50	55	−5	61

== Cup matches ==
=== FA Cup ===
As a Second Division team, Gillingham entered the 1996–97 FA Cup in the first round. A goal from Butler gave Gillingham 1–0 victory over Hereford United of the Third Division. In the second round, Gillingham played another Third Division team, Cardiff City, and won 2–0 with goals from Onuora and Hessenthaler. The teams from the top two divisions of English football entered the competition in the third round and Gillingham were paired with Derby County of the FA Premier League. The game took place on 14 January and by the midway point of the second half remained goalless, however the referee abandoned the match due to the frozen pitch. The game was rescheduled for a week later; with forwards Onuora, Akinbiyi and Bailey all unavailable due to injury or suspension, Gillingham played poorly and lost 2–0.

==== Match details ====
Key

- In result column, Gillingham's score shown first
- H = Home match
- A = Away match
- pen. = Penalty kick
- o.g. = Own goal

Results

Date	Round	Opponents	Result	Goalscorers	Attendance
16 November 1996	First	Hereford United (H)	1–0	Butler	5,280
7 December 1996	Second	Cardiff City (A)	2–0	Onuora, Hessenthaler	3,474
21 January 1997	Third	Derby County (H)	0–2		9,508

=== Football League Cup ===
As a Second Division team, Gillingham entered the 1996–97 Football League Cup in the first round and were drawn to play Swansea City of the Third Division. Gillingham won the first leg of the two-legged tie 1–0 at Swansea's Vetch Field and then won the second leg at Priestfield 2–0 to progress 3–0 on aggregate. In the second round, Gillingham played Barnsley of the First Division. The first leg at Barnsley's Oakwell ground ended in a 1–1 draw and Gillingham won the second leg 1–0 to eliminate their higher-level opponents. In the third round, Gillingham were paired with Coventry City of the FA Premier League. The match drew an attendance of 10,603, the largest of the season at Priestfield. Coventry scored two goals in the first half, but goals from Onuora and Ratcliffe in the second half earned Gillingham a draw. The replay took place at Coventry's Highfield Road ground, and a second half goal from Neil Smith gave Gillingham a 1–0 win; Trevor Haylett of The Guardian attributed Gillingham's victory to their "compact, disciplined rearguard in which their three centre-halves stood tall all night against a Coventry attack whose ideas petered out after a bright opening spell". It was the club's first victory over a team from the top division of English football since 1908 and first ever win over top-level opposition away from home. Gillingham's opponents in the fourth round were Ipswich Town of the First Division. A goal approximately 15 minutes from the end of the game gave Ipswich a 1–0 win and Gillingham, for whom Ratcliffe was sent off, were eliminated from the League Cup. Bryant was missing from the Gillingham team and Pulis admitted after the match that this was because the defender had been accidentally shot in the leg while participating in field sports.

==== Match details ====
Key

- In result column, Gillingham's score shown first
- H = Home match
- A = Away match
- pen. = Penalty kick
- o.g. = Own goal

Results

Date	Round	Opponents	Result	Goalscorers	Attendance
20 August 1996	First (first leg)	Swansea City (A)	1–0	Torpey (o.g.)	2,711
4 September 1996	First (second leg)	Swansea City (H)	2–0	Fortune-West, Butler	3,633
17 September 1996	Second (first leg)	Barnsley (A)	1–1	Ratcliffe	4,491
24 September 1996	Second (second leg)	Barnsley (H)	1–0	Puttnam	5,666
22 October 1996	Third	Coventry City (H)	2–2	Onuora, Ratcliffe	10,603
13 November 1996	Third (replay)	Coventry City (A)	1–0	Smith	12,639
26 November 1996	Fourth	Ipswich Town (A)	0–1		13,537

=== Football League Trophy ===
In the first round of the 1996–97 Football League Trophy, a tournament exclusively for Second and Third Division teams, Gillingham played Cardiff City of the Third Division. The score was 1–1 after 90 minutes, but Cardiff scored a golden goal winner in extra time to eliminate Gillingham from the competition; it was the first time Gillingham had ever lost to such a goal. The attendance of 1,193 was the lowest of the season at Priestfield.

==== Match details ====
Key

- In result column, Gillingham's score shown first
- H = Home match
- A = Away match
- pen. = Penalty kick
- o.g. = Own goal

Results

Date	Round	Opponents	Result	Goalscorers	Attendance
10 December 1996	First	Cardiff City (H)	1–2 (a.e.t.)	Piper	1,193

== Players ==
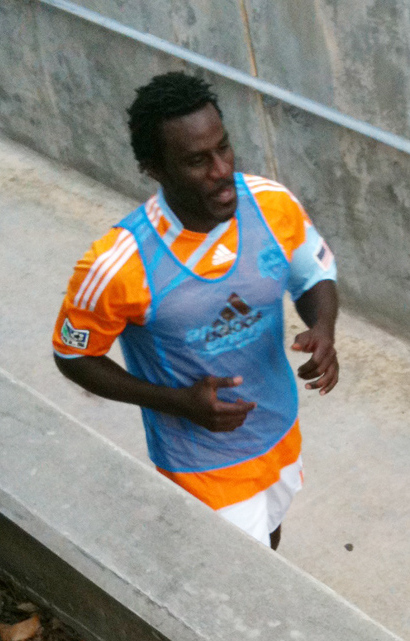
Ade Akinbiyi (pictured in 2009) made 19 appearances and scored 7 goals.

Thirty players made at least one appearance for Gillingham during the season. Ratcliffe made the most, playing in 52 of the team's 57 games. Smith played 51 times and five other players made more than 40 appearances. Two players made only one appearance each. Richard Carpenter, who had played for Gillingham since 1990, played in one game at the start of the season before being transferred to Fulham. Andrew Sambrook, a teenager from the club's youth team, made one appearance for the first team; the club offered him a professional contract at the end of the season, but he opted to accept a sporting scholarship to a university in the United States.

Fifteen players scored at least one goal for Gillingham during the season. Onuora was the top scorer; he scored 21 times in the Second Division, once in the FA Cup, and once in the League Cup. His total of 23 goals was the highest by a Gillingham player for five seasons; it was more than twice that of the next highest scorer, Butler, who achieved a total of 11 goals across all competitions.

Player statistics
Player	Position	Second Division		FA Cup		League Cup		League Trophy		Total	
Player	Position	Apps	Goals	Apps	Goals	Apps	Goals	Apps	Goals	Apps	Goals
Ade Akinbiyi	FW	19	7	0	0	0	0	0	0	19	7
Craig Armstrong	DF	10	0	0	0	2	0	1	0	13	0
Dennis Bailey	FW	30	2	1	0	7	0	1	0	39	2
Matt Bryant	DF	39	0	2	0	6	0	0	0	47	0
Steve Butler	FW	38	9	3	1	5	1	0	0	46	11
Guy Butters	DF	30	0	3	0	0	0	0	0	33	0
Richard Carpenter	MF	1	0	0	0	0	0	0	0	1	0
Ian Chapman	DF	23	1	3	0	5	0	1	0	32	1
Jon Ford	DF	4	0	1	0	3	0	1	0	9	0
Leo Fortune-West	FW	7	2	0	0	1	1	0	0	8	3
Mick Galloway	MF	9	1	0	0	0	0	0	0	9	1
Jonathan Gould	GK	3	0	0	0	0	0	0	0	3	0
Richard Green	DF	29	2	3	0	2	0	0	0	34	2
Mark Harris	DF	21	1	2	0	6	0	1	0	30	1
Andy Hessenthaler	MF	38	2	3	1	7	0	0	0	48	3
John Humphrey	DF	9	0	0	0	3	0	1	0	13	0
Billy Manuel	MF	11	0	1	0	0	0	1	0	13	0
Andy Marshall	GK	5	0	0	0	1	0	1	0	7	0
Mark Morris	DF	6	0	0	0	2	0	0	0	8	0
Mark O'Connor	FW	22	0	3	0	1	0	0	0	26	0
Iffy Onuora	FW	40	21	2	1	6	1	0	0	48	23
Adrian Pennock	DF	26	2	2	0	1	0	1	0	30	2
James Pinnock	FW	2	0	0	0	0	0	1	0	3	0
Lenny Piper	MF	19	1	1	0	4	0	1	1	25	2
Dave Puttnam	FW	14	1	2	0	6	1	1	0	23	2
Simon Ratcliffe	DF	43	6	2	0	7	2	0	0	52	8
Andrew Sambrook	DF	1	0	0	0	0	0	0	0	1	0
Neil Smith	MF	42	1	2	0	7	1	0	0	51	2
Jim Stannard	GK	38	0	3	0	6	0	0	0	47	0
Glen Thomas	DF	10	0	1	0	0	0	1	0	12	0

FW = Forward, MF = Midfielder, GK = Goalkeeper, DF = Defender

== Aftermath ==
At the end of the season, the Gordon Road stand at Priestfield was demolished and replaced with a new stand in the first significant redevelopment of the stadium for more than 30 years. Harris and Smith left the club to join Cardiff City and Fulham respectively. Following on from the strong finish to the 1996–97 season, Gillingham began the following season mounting a challenge for promotion, which would take the club to the second tier of English football for the first time, but the team ultimately fell short of the play-offs, finishing seventh.
