= 1992–93 Brentford F.C. season =

English football team season

Brentford
1992–93 season
- Chairman: Martin Lange
- Manager: Phil Holder
- Stadium: Griffin Park
- First Division: 22nd (relegated)
- FA Cup: Third round
- League Cup: Second round
- Anglo-Italian Cup: Semi-final
- Top goalscorer: League: Blissett (21); All: Blissett (29)
- Highest home attendance: 11,912
- Lowest home attendance: 2,607
- Average home league attendance: 8,476
Home colours	Away colours

During the 1992–93 English football season, Brentford competed in the second tier of English football for the first time since 1953–54. After rising to mid-table by December 1992, just four wins from the final 24 matches relegated the Bees straight back to the Second Division. Brentford played in the Anglo-Italian Cup for the first and only time during the season and lost to Derby County in the semi-finals.

== Season summary ==
Brentford's 1992–93 First Division season was the club's first in the second tier of English football since 1953–54. Manager Phil Holder kept faith with the squad which won the 1991–92 Third Division title, with Jamie Bates, Paul Buckle, Keith Millen, Neil Smillie, Simon Ratcliffe, Chris Hughton, Kevin Godfrey and Lee Luscombe all signing new contracts. The club was hit by the departure of star striker Dean Holdsworth, who refused to sign a new contract and joined Premier League club Wimbledon on 20 July 1992 for a fee which rose to £720,000. As a replacement, Holder signed Grimsby Town forward Murray Jones for a £75,000 fee. Other new signings were midfielders Mickey Bennett and Detzi Kruszyński from Wimbledon (as makeweights in the Holdsworth transfer) and Channel Islands midfielder Grant Chalmers.

As soon as the season began, Brentford suffered an injury hoodoo, losing centre back Terry Evans, goalkeeper Graham Benstead and midfielders Bob Booker and Wilf Rostron to long-term knee injuries. Just two wins from the opening 12 matches left the club in the relegation places and manager Phil Holder was forced to strengthen the team with loanee goalkeeper Gerry Peyton, centre back Shane Westley (purchased from Wolverhampton Wanderers for £100,000) and forward Joe Allon from Chelsea for a club-record £275,000 fee. Brentford came into form in late October 1992, losing just two of 11 matches to rise to 10th place and within three points of the playoff positions by 28 December, with Holder winning the December First Division Manager of the Month award.

A catalogue of injuries to Chris Hughton, Simon Ratcliffe, Neil Smillie and Marcus Gayle in early 1993 saw Brentford lose 11 of 13 league matches and drop to 22nd place. Some solace was found in the Anglo-Italian Cup, with the Bees winning six consecutive matches before falling to Derby County over two legs in the semi-finals. In February and March, manager Holder strengthened the squad by bringing in former England left back Kenny Sansom, midfielder Alan Dickens, winger Paul Stephenson and former loan goalkeeper Gerry Peyton in on permanent deals. The signings and the return to fitness of Terry Evans, Bob Booker, Neil Smillie and Wilf Rostron led to a revival in late March, with Brentford winning twice and drawing three times in a six-match spell.

Successive defeats to West Ham United and Watford in late April put Brentford back into the relegation places, before a 3–1 victory over Barnsley at Griffin Park in the penultimate match of the season elevated the club to 21st place. 4,000 Brentford supporters travelled to Ashton Gate for the final match of the season versus Bristol City, knowing that at the very least, defeat for 22nd place Cambridge United and a draw for 23rd place Birmingham City would see the Bees retain their First Division status. A 4–1 defeat and victory for Birmingham City relegated Brentford back to the Second Division. Manager Phil Holder and assistant manager Wilf Rostron lost their jobs in the wake of the relegation and it wasn't until the 2014–15 season that Brentford again played second-tier football.

== League table ==
Pos	Team	Pld	W	D	L	GF	GA	GD	Pts	Qualification or relegation
20	Luton Town	46	10	21	15	48	62	−14	51	
21	Sunderland	46	13	11	22	50	64	−14	50	
22	Brentford (R)	46	13	10	23	52	71	−19	49	Relegation to the Second Division
23	Cambridge United (R)	46	11	16	19	48	69	−21	49	Relegation to the Second Division
24	Bristol Rovers (R)	46	10	11	25	55	87	−32	41	Relegation to the Second Division

Source: rsssf.com
Rules for classification: 1) Points; 2) Goals scored; 3) Goal difference
(R) Relegated

== Pre-season results ==
21 July 1992	Arsenal	1–1	Brentford
			Jones

22 July 1992	Chesham United	2–2	Brentford	The Meadow
			Blissett; Luscombe

25 July 1992	Merthyr Tydfil	4–1	Brentford	Penydarren Park
			Jones

27 July 1992	Windsor & Eton	0–5	Brentford	Stag Meadow
			Luscombe; Blissett; Buckle; Bennett

1 August 1992	Brentford	1–2	Queens Park Rangers	Griffin Park
	(o.g.)			Attendance: 4,441

3 August 1992	Slough Town	1–3	Brentford	Arbour Park
			Bennett; Smillie

5 August 1992	Uxbridge	2–4	Brentford	Honeycroft
			Chalmers; Ravenscroft; Buckle; Manuel

8 August 1992	Woking	1–2	Brentford	Kingfield Stadium
			Godfrey; Evans

10 August 1992	Harrow Borough	1–0	Brentford	Earlsmead Stadium

== Football League First Division results ==
=== League results summary ===
Overall								Home						Away					
Pld	W	D	L	GF	GA	GD	Pts	W	D	L	GF	GA	GD	W	D	L	GF	GA	GD
46	13	10	23	66	80	−14	49	7	6	10	28	30	−2	6	4	13	38	50	−12

Source: Statto

=== Results and position by round ===
Round	1	2	3	4	5	6	7	8	9	10	11	12	13	14	15	16	17	18	19	20	21	22	23	24	25	26	27	28	29	30	31	32	33	34	35	36	37	38	39	40	41	42	43	44	45	46
Ground	H	A	H	H	A	H	A	H	H	A	H	A	H	A	H	A	H	H	A	A	H	H	A	H	A	A	H	A	A	H	A	H	A	H	A	H	A	H	A	H	A	H	A	A	H	A
Result	L	L	W	W	L	L	D	D	L	D	D	L	W	W	W	L	L	W	W	W	D	W	D	L	L	L	L	W	D	L	L	L	L	L	L	L	W	D	W	D	L	D	L	L	W	L
Position	23	21	18	8	11	15	17	16	19	19	20	21	19	18	16	16	17	17	12	11	12	10	10	12	13	13	16	14	12	13	16	17	17	18	19	22	19	19	16	17	20	17	20	22	21	22

Source: Statto
A = Away; H = Home; W = Win; D = Draw; L = Loss

=== Matches ===
==== August ====
15 August 1992 1	Brentford	0–2	Wolverhampton Wanderers	Griffin Park
15:00			Dennison 47'; Bull 53'	Attendance: 9,069

22 August 1992 2	Bristol Rovers	2–1	Brentford	Twerton Park
15:00			Blissett 50'	Attendance: 5,779

29 August 1992 3	Brentford	2–1	Southend United	Griffin Park
15:00	Bennett 7'; Millen 64'		Benjamin	Attendance: 6,431

==== September ====
1 September 1992 4	Brentford	4–1	Portsmouth	Griffin Park
19:45	Bennett 37'; Smillie 65'; Gayle 82'; Blissett 84'		Symons	Attendance: 8,471

4 September 1992 5	Cambridge United	1–0	Brentford	Abbey Stadium
19:45				Attendance: 5,075

13 September 1992 6	Brentford	1–2	Luton Town	Griffin Park
12:00	Blissett 51'			Referee: 7,310

19 September 1992 7	Leicester City	0–0	Brentford	Filbert Street
15:00				Attendance: 12,972

26 September 1992 8	Brentford	1–1	Millwall	Griffin Park
15:00	Ratcliffe 39'		Allen	Attendance: 8,823

==== October ====
4 October 1992 9	Brentford	1–2	Newcastle United	Griffin Park
	Blissett 78'		Kelly 10'; Peacock 64'	Attendance: 10,131

10 October 1992 10	Peterborough United	0–0	Brentford	London Road
15:00				Attendance: 5,818

17 October 1992 11	Brentford	1–1	Watford	Griffin Park
15:00	Putney 26' (o.g.)			Attendance: 8,490

24 October 1992 12	Barnsley	3–2	Brentford	Oakwell
15:00			Blissett 28', 40'	Attendance: 4,928

31 October 1992 13	Brentford	5–1	Bristol City	Griffin Park
15:00	Millen 17', 47'; Chalmers 44'; Blissett 55', 60'			Attendance: 8,726

==== November ====
3 November 1992 14	Swindon Town	0–2	Brentford	County Ground
19:45			Blissett 19'; Luscombe 31'	Attendance: 7,832

7 November 1992 15	Brentford	2–0	Charlton Athletic	Griffin Park
15:00	Luscombe 25', 62'			Attendance: 9,354

14 November 1992 16	Tranmere Rovers	3–2	Brentford	Prenton Park
15:00			Blissett 30'; Gayle 36'	Attendance: 7,852

21 November 1992 17	Brentford	1–3	Grimsby Town	Griffin Park
15:00	Allon 79' (pen.)			Attendance: 7,439

28 November 1992 18	Brentford	1–0	Oxford United	Griffin Park
15:00	Allon 1' (pen.)			Attendance: 8,017

==== December ====
5 December 1992 19	Birmingham City	1–3	Brentford	St Andrew's
15:00			Blissett 2'; Ratcliffe 20'; Manuel 78'	Attendance: 8,582

12 December 1992 20	Sunderland	1–3	Brentford	Roker Park
15:00	Cunnington		Blissett 7', 84'; Bennett 47'	Attendance: 16,972

20 December 1992 21	Brentford	0–0	West Ham United	Griffin Park
11:30				Attendance: 11,912

26 December 1992 22	Brentford	2–1	Derby County	Griffin Park
12:20	Allon 40'; Goulooze 42' (o.g.)		Kitson	Attendance: 10,226

28 December 1992 23	Notts County	1–1	Brentford	Meadow Lane
15:00	Agana 29'		Westley 41'	Attendance: 6,892

==== January ====
9 January 1993 24	Brentford	1–3	Leicester City	Griffin Park
15:00	Blissett 35'		Thompson; Walsh	Attendance: 8,698

17 January 1993 25	Millwall	6–1	Brentford	The Den
	Rae; Cooper; Goodman; Moralee		Blissett 53'	Attendance: 7,571

23 January 1993 26	Portsmouth	1–0	Brentford	Fratton Park
15:00	Aspinall			Attendance: 10,267

30 January 1993 27	Brentford	0–3	Bristol Rovers	Griffin Park
15:00				Attendance: 7,527

==== February ====
6 February 1993 28	Wolverhampton Wanderers	1–2	Brentford	Molineux
15:00	Mutch 49'		Allon 68' (pen.), 70'	Attendance: 12,361

9 February 1993 29	Luton Town	0–0	Brentford	Kenilworth Road
19:45				Attendance: 7,248

14 February 1993 30	Brentford	0–1	Cambridge United	Griffin Park
11:30				Attendance: 7,318

21 February 1993 31	Southend United	3–0	Brentford	Roots Hall
	Jones; Collymore; Ansah			Attendance: 4,123

27 February 1993 32	Brentford	0–1	Peterborough United	Griffin Park
15:00			Philliskirk	Attendance: 6,337

==== March ====
6 March 1993 33	Newcastle United	5–1	Brentford	St James' Park
15:00	Kelly 24'; Bracewell 49'; Clark 55', 83'; Lee 72'		Scott 58' (o.g.)	Attendance: 30,006

9 March 1993 34	Brentford	0–1	Tranmere Rovers	Griffin Park
19:45				Attendance: 7,526

13 March 1993 35	Charlton Athletic	1–0	Brentford	The Valley
15:00				Attendance: 7,194

20 March 1993 36	Brentford	0–2	Birmingham City	Griffin Park
15:00				Attendance: 7,532

23 March 1993 37	Grimsby Town	0–1	Brentford	Blundell Park
19:45			Blissett 70'	Attendance: 4,384

27 March 1993 38	Brentford	0–0	Swindon Town	Griffin Park
15:00				Attendance: 10,197

==== April ====
3 April 1993 39	Oxford United	0–2	Brentford	Manor Ground
15:00			Blissett 26'; Bennett 80'	Attendance: 5,466

6 April 1993 40	Brentford	1–1	Sunderland	Griffin Park
19:45	Gayle 42'		Goodman	Attendance: 9,302

10 April 1993 41	Derby County	3–2	Brentford	Baseball Ground
15:00	Gabbiadini; Kitson; Simpson		Gayle 45'; Millen 76'	Attendance: 12,366

12 April 1993 42	Brentford	2–2	Notts County	Griffin Park
	Dickens 16'; Blissett 65'			Attendance: 8,047

17 April 1993 43	West Ham United	4–0	Brentford	Upton Park
15:00	Allen; Butler; Morley; Keen			Attendance: 16,522

24 April 1993 44	Watford	1–0	Brentford	Vicarage Road
15:00	Drysdale			Attendance: 9,045

==== May ====
1 May 1993 45	Brentford	3–1	Barnsley	Griffin Park
15:00	Blissett 18' (39), pen' Allon 69'			Attendance: 7,958

8 May 1993 46	Bristol City	4–1	Brentford	Ashton Gate Stadium
15:00			Blissett	Attendance: 12,659

- Source: Statto, 11v11, The Big Brentford Book Of The Nineties

== Cup results ==
=== FA Cup ===
2 January 1993 3	Brentford	0–2	Grimsby Town	Griffin Park
15:00				Attendance: 6,880

=== League Cup ===
18 August 1992 1 (1st leg)	Fulham	0–2	Brentford	Craven Cottage
			Booker; Bennett	Attendance: 5,067

25 August 1992 1 (2nd leg)	Brentford	2–0	Fulham	Griffin Park
	Bates; Blissett			Attendance: 4,806

21 September 1992 2 (1st leg)	Tottenham Hotspur	3–1	Brentford	White Hart Lane
	Watson; Durie; Sheringham		Blissett	Attendance: 19,365

7 October 1992 2 (2nd leg)	Brentford	2–4	Tottenham Hotspur	Griffin Park
	Blissett; Millen		Sheringham pen' Turner; Anderton	Attendance: 11,445

=== Anglo-Italian Cup ===
16 September 1992 Preliminary	Swindon Town	1–2	Brentford	County Ground
			Gayle	Attendance: 3,819

29 September 1992 Preliminary	Brentford	2–0	Oxford United	Griffin Park
	Ratcliffe; Blissett			Attendance: 2,607

11 November 1992 1	Ascoli	1–3	Brentford	Stadio Cino e Lillo Del Duca
			Bates; Gayle; Blissett	Attendance: 880

24 November 1992 1	Brentford	1–0	Lucchese	Griffin Park
	Allon			Attendance: 4,339

8 December 1992 1	Cesena	0–1	Brentford	Stadio Dino Manuzzi
			Allon	Attendance: 450

16 December 1992 1	Brentford	2–1	Bari	Griffin Park
	Godfrey; Luscombe			Attendance: 4,554

27 January 1993 Semi-final (1st leg)	Brentford	3–4	Derby County	Griffin Park
	Allon		Patterson; Gabbiadini; Kitson	Attendance: 5,227

3 February 1993 Semi-final (2nd leg)	Derby County	1–2	Brentford	Baseball Ground
	Gabbiadini		Blissett	Attendance: 14,494

- Source: Statto, 11v11, The Big Brentford Book Of The Nineties

== Playing squad ==
Players' ages are as of the opening day of the 1992–93 season.

Pos.	Name	Nat.	Date of birth (age)	Signed from	Signed in	Notes
Goalkeepers
GK	Tamer Aouf	(England)	7 December 1974 (aged 17)	Youth	1993	
GK	Ashley Bayes	(England)	19 April 1972 (aged 20)	Youth	1990	Loaned to Kingsbury Town
GK	Graham Benstead	(England)	20 August 1963 (aged 28)	Sheffield United	1990	
GK	Gerry Peyton	(Republic of Ireland)	20 May 1956 (aged 36)	Everton	1993	Loaned from Everton before transferring permanently
Defenders
DF	Jamie Bates	(England)	24 February 1968 (aged 24)	Youth	1986	
DF	Terry Evans (c)	(England)	12 April 1965 (aged 27)	Hillingdon	1985	
DF	Billy Manuel	(England)	28 June 1969 (aged 23)	Gillingham	1991	
DF	Keith Millen	(England)	26 September 1966 (aged 25)	Youth	1985	
DF	Kenny Sansom	(England)	26 September 1958 (aged 33)	Everton	1993	
DF	Chris Sparks	(England)	28 December 1973 (aged 18)	Youth	1992	
DF	Brian Statham	(England)	21 May 1969 (aged 23)	Tottenham Hotspur	1992	
DF	Danny Tripp	(England)	11 August 1974 (aged 18)	Youth	1992	
DF	Shane Westley	(England)	16 June 1965 (aged 27)	Wolverhampton Wanderers	1992	
Midfielders
MF	Bob Booker	(England)	25 January 1958 (aged 34)	Sheffield United	1991	
MF	Paul Buckle	(England)	16 December 1970 (aged 21)	Youth	1988	Loaned to Wycombe Wanderers
MF	Grant Chalmers	(Guernsey)	12 September 1969 (aged 22)	Northerners	1992	
MF	Alan Dickens	(England)	3 September 1964 (aged 27)	Chelsea	1993	
MF	Kevin Godfrey	(England)	24 February 1960 (aged 32)	Leyton Orient	1988	
MF	Detzi Kruszyński	(Poland)	14 October 1960 (aged 31)	Wimbledon	1992	
MF	Robbie Peters	(England)	18 May 1971 (aged 21)	Youth	1989	Loaned to Woking
MF	Simon Ratcliffe	(England)	8 February 1967 (aged 25)	Norwich City	1989	
MF	Wilf Rostron	(England)	29 September 1956 (aged 35)	Sheffield United	1991	Assistant manager
MF	Neil Smilie	(England)	19 July 1958 (aged 34)	Reading	1988	
MF	Paul Stephenson	(England)	2 January 1968 (aged 24)	Millwall	1993	
Forwards
FW	Joe Allon	(England)	12 January 1966 (aged 26)	Chelsea	1992	
FW	Mickey Bennett	(England)	27 July 1969 (aged 23)	Wimbledon	1992	
FW	Gary Blissett	(England)	29 June 1964 (aged 28)	Crewe Alexandra	1987	
FW	Marcus Gayle	(England)	27 September 1970 (aged 21)	Youth	1988	
FW	Murray Jones	(England)	7 October 1964 (aged 27)	Grimsby Town	1992	
FW	Lee Luscombe	(England)	16 July 1971 (aged 21)	Southampton	1991	
Players who left the club mid-season
DF	Chris Hughton	(Republic of Ireland)	11 December 1958 (aged 33)	West Ham United	1992	Coach, retired
DF	Paul Mortimer	(England)	8 May 1968 (aged 24)	Crystal Palace	1993	Returned to Crystal Palace after loan

- Source: The Big Brentford Book Of The Nineties

== Coaching staff ==
Name	Role
(England) Phil Holder	Manager
(England) Wilf Rostron	Assistant manager
(Republic of Ireland) Chris Hughton	Coach
(England) Graham Pearce	Coach
(England) Fergus Dignan	Medical officer
(England) Eric Radley-Smith	Medical consultant
(England) Roy Clare	Physiotherapist

== Statistics ==
=== Appearances and goals ===
Substitute appearances in brackets.

Pos	Nat	Name	League		FA Cup		League Cup		A-I Cup		Total	
Pos	Nat	Name	Apps	Goals	Apps	Goals	Apps	Goals	Apps	Goals	Apps	Goals
GK	(England)	Ashley Bayes	2	0	—		2	0	1	0	5	0
GK	(England)	Graham Benstead	25	0	1	0	2	0	4	0	32	0
GK	(Republic of Ireland)	Gerry Peyton	19	0	—		—		3	0	22	0
DF	(England)	Jamie Bates	24	0	0	0	4	1	7	1	35	2
DF	(England)	Terry Evans	11	0	0	0	0	0	0	0	11	0
DF	(Republic of Ireland)	Chris Hughton	20	0	0	0	4	0	5	0	29	0
DF	(England)	Billy Manuel	39 (2)	1	1	0	0 (1)	0	6	0	46 (3)	1
DF	(England)	Keith Millen	43	4	0	0	4	1	7	0	54	5
DF	(England)	Kenny Sansom	8	0	—		—		—		8	0
DF	(England)	Brian Statham	45	0	1	0	4	0	8	0	58	0
DF	(England)	Shane Westley	15 (2)	1	1	0	—		0	0	16 (2)	1
MF	(England)	Bob Booker	1 (2)	0	0	0	2 (1)	1	0	0	3 (3)	1
MF	(England)	Paul Buckle	4 (1)	0	—		0	0	0 (3)	0	4 (4)	0
MF	(Guernsey)	Grant Chalmers	9 (2)	1	1	0	1	0	4	0	15 (2)	1
MF	(England)	Alan Dickens	13 (2)	1	—		—		—		13 (2)	1
MF	(England)	Kevin Godfrey	9 (12)	0	0	0	1 (2)	0	4 (3)	2	14 (17)	2
MF	(Poland)	Detzi Kruszyński	5 (1)	0	0	0	1	0	1	0	7 (1)	0
MF	(England)	Robbie Peters	0 (1)	0	0	0	0	0	0	0	0 (1)	0
MF	(England)	Simon Ratcliffe	25 (5)	2	0	0	4	0	4	1	33 (5)	3
MF	(England)	Wilf Rostron	1 (1)	0	0	0	0	0	0	0	1 (1)	0
MF	(England)	Neil Smilie	18 (3)	1	1	0	4	0	2 (1)	0	25 (4)	1
MF	(England)	Paul Stephenson	11	0	—		—		—		11	0
FW	(England)	Joe Allon	17 (7)	6	1	0	—		5	5	23 (7)	11
FW	(England)	Mickey Bennett	34 (4)	4	1	0	2 (1)	0	6 (1)	0	43 (6)	4
FW	(England)	Gary Blissett	46	21	1	0	4	4	8	4	59	29
FW	(England)	Marcus Gayle	31 (7)	4	1	0	2 (2)	0	5 (3)	2	39 (12)	6
FW	(England)	Murray Jones	6 (10)	0	0	0	1 (1)	0	0 (2)	0	7 (13)	0
FW	(England)	Lee Luscombe	19 (10)	3	1	0	2	0	6 (2)	1	28 (12)	4
Players loaned in during the season
DF	(England)	Paul Mortimer	6	0	—		—		2	0	8	0

- Players listed in italics left the club mid-season.
- Source: The Big Brentford Book Of The Nineties

=== Goalscorers ===
Pos.	Nat	Player	FL1	FAC	FLC	AIC	Total
FW	(England)	Gary Blissett	21	0	4	4	29
FW	(England)	Joe Allon	6	0	—	5	11
FW	(England)	Marcus Gayle	4	0	0	2	6
DF	(England)	Keith Millen	4	0	1	0	5
FW	(England)	Mickey Bennett	4	0	0	0	4
FW	(England)	Lee Luscombe	3	0	0	1	4
MF	(England)	Simon Ratcliffe	2	0	0	1	3
DF	(England)	Jamie Bates	0	0	1	1	2
MF	(England)	Kevin Godfrey	0	0	0	2	2
MF	(England)	Alan Dickens	1	—	—	—	1
DF	(England)	Shane Westley	1	0	—	0	1
MF	(Guernsey)	Grant Chalmers	1	0	0	0	1
DF	(England)	Billy Manuel	1	0	0	0	1
MF	(England)	Neil Smilie	1	0	0	0	1
MF	(England)	Bob Booker	0	0	1	0	1
Opponents			3	0	0	0	3
Total			52	0	7	16	75

- Players listed in italics left the club mid-season.
- Source: The Big Brentford Book Of The Nineties

=== Management ===
Name	Nat	From	To	Record All Comps					Record League				
Name	Nat	From	To	P	W	D	L	W %	P	W	D	L	W %
Phil Holder	(England)	15 August 1992	8 May 1993	59	22	10	27	37.29|	46	13	10	23	28.26

=== Summary ===
Games played	59 (46 First Division, 1 FA Cup, 4 League Cup, 8 Anglo-Italian Cup)
Games won	22 (13 First Division, 0 FA Cup, 2 League Cup, 7 Anglo-Italian Cup)
Games drawn	10 (10 First Division, 0 FA Cup, 0 League Cup, 0 Anglo-Italian Cup)
Games lost	27 (13 First Division, 1 FA Cup, 2 League Cup, 1 Anglo-Italian Cup)
Goals scored	75 (52 First Division, 0 FA Cup, 7 League Cup, 16 Anglo-Italian Cup)
Goals conceded	88 (71 First Division, 2 FA Cup, 7 League Cup, 8 Anglo-Italian Cup)
Clean sheets	15 (10 First Division, 0 FA Cup, 2 League Cup, 3 Anglo-Italian Cup)
Biggest league win	5–1 versus Bristol City, 31 October 1992
Worst league defeat	6–1 versus Millwall, 17 January 1993
Most appearances	59, Gary Blissett (46 First Division, 1 FA Cup, 4 League Cup, 8 Anglo-Italian Cup)
Top scorer (league)	21, Gary Blissett
Top scorer (all competitions)	29, Gary Blissett

== Transfers & loans ==
Players transferred in
Date	Pos.	Name	Previous club	Fee	Ref.
14 July 1992	FW	(England) Mickey Bennett	(England) Wimbledon	n/a	
July 1992	FW	(England) Murray Jones	(England) Grimsby Town	£75,000	
July 1992	MF	(Poland) Detzi Kruszyński	(England) Wimbledon	£60,000	
August 1992	MF	(Guernsey) Grant Chalmers	(England) Northerners	n/a	
30 October 1992	DF	(England) Shane Westley	(England) Wolverhampton Wanderers	£100,000	
19 November 1992	FW	(England) Joe Allon	(England) Chelsea	£275,000	
February 1993	DF	(England) Alan Dickens	(England) Chelsea	Non-contract	
4 March 1993	MF	(England) Paul Stephenson	(England) Millwall	£30,000	
March 1993	GK	(Republic of Ireland) Gerry Peyton	(England) Everton	Free	
March 1993	DF	(England) Kenny Sansom	(England) Everton	Free	
Players loaned in
Date from	Pos.	Name	From	Date to	Ref.
September 1992	GK	(Republic of Ireland) Gerry Peyton	(England) Everton	December 1992	
22 January 1993	DF	(England) Paul Mortimer	(England) Crystal Palace	22 February 1993	
Players transferred out
Date	Pos.	Name	Subsequent club	Fee	Ref.
20 July 1992	FW	(England) Dean Holdsworth	(England) Wimbledon	£720,000	
Players loaned out
Date from	Pos.	Name	To	Date to	Ref.
December 1992	GK	(England) Ashley Bayes	(England) Kingsbury Town	January 1993	
December 1992	MF	(England) Paul Buckle	(England) Wycombe Wanderers	January 1993	
March 1993	MF	(England) Robbie Peters	(England) Woking	End of season	
Players released
Date	Pos.	Name	Subsequent club	Join date	Ref.
April 1993	DF	(Republic of Ireland) Chris Hughton	Retired		
May 1993	GK	(England) Ashley Bayes	(England) Torquay United	13 August 1993	
May 1993	MF	(England) Bob Booker	Retired		
May 1993	DF	(England) Alan Dickens	(England) Colchester United	4 September 1993	
May 1993	MF	(England) Kevin Godfrey	(England) Yeading	1993	
May 1993	FW	(Guernsey) Lee Luscombe	(England) Millwall	June 1993	
May 1993	MF	(England) Wilf Rostron	Retired		
May 1993	DF	(England) Kenny Sansom	(England) Chertsey Town	1993	
May 1993	DF	(England) Chris Sparks	(England) Chertsey Town	1993	
May 1993	DF	(England) Danny Tripp	(England) Grays Athletic	1993	

== Kit ==
Supplier: Hummel International
Sponsor(s): KLM

Home	Away	Goalkeeper	Goalkeeper

Source: Historical Kits

== Awards ==
- Supporters' Player of the Year: Billy Manuel
- Football League First Division Manager of the Month: Phil Holder (December 1992)
- Jewson National Award
