= Lenny Piper =

English footballer (1977–2024)

Personal information
- Full name: Leonard Henry Piper
- Date of birth: 8 August 1977
- Place of birth: Camberwell, England
- Date of death: 28 January 2024 (aged 46)
- Height: 5 ft 6 in (1.68 m)
- Position: Midfielder

Youth career
- 1991–1995: Wimbledon

Senior career*
Years	Team	Apps	(Gls)
1995–1996	Wimbledon	0	(0)
1996–1998	Gillingham	20	(1)
1998	Welling United	1	(0)
1998–2000	St Albans City	70	(21)
2000–2003	Farnborough Town	80	(25)
2003–2004	Dagenham & Redbridge	15	(0)
2003–2004	→ Margate (loan)	8	(3)
2004–2007	Fisher Athletic		
2004	→ Tonbridge Angels (loan)	4	(0)
2007–2008	Beckenham Town		
2008	Ramsgate	9	(1)
2008–2009	Beckenham Town		
2009	Whyteleafe	1	(0)

International career
1995–1996	England U18	5	(3)

Managerial career
- 2005: Fisher Athletic (caretaker-manager)
- * Club domestic league appearances and goals

Leonard Henry Piper (8 August 1977 – 28 January 2024) was an English professional footballer who played as a midfielder.

== Early career ==
Born in London, Piper played Sunday league football for a local side Metrolite when he was around 8 or 9. When he was 13, he was picked up by Wimbledon after being scouted by John Frett. He started off by just training with the side but after a couple of weeks he signed schoolboy forms and subsequently signed Youth Training Scheme (YTS) forms in October 1991 at the age of 14.

He was a part of the sides that won the Southern Junior Floodlight Cup and also reached the FA Youth Cup semi-finals in consecutive seasons, losing to a Manchester United side that contained Phil Neville and a West Ham United side that featured Rio Ferdinand. He was in the same age group as Carl Cort and Jason Euell and all signed professional terms at the same time in June 1995. When he finished as a YTS, Wimbledon offered him a two-year contract but Piper chose to just sign a one-year deal, as he was unsure whether he would enjoy it or not.

== Club career ==
=== Wimbledon ===
While Piper did not appear in the Premier League for the Dons, he did feature in all four games of the 1995 UEFA Intertoto Cup group stage. He made his professional debut on 25 June 1995 in a 4–0 home defeat to Bursaspor and scored Wimbledon's only goal of the campaign in an 1–1 away draw to Slovak side Košice. He was later offered a four-year contract by Wimbledon but turned the offer down on advice from his agent, who believed that his footballing style would be more suited to a lower league club, where he could then gain regular football and be sold on again in a couple of years. He stated that his involvement with the England youth team stunted his progression with the Dons, as when he was away with the national side, other youth team players were getting a chance in the first team.

=== Gillingham ===
Piper moved to Second Division side Gillingham for a transfer fee of £40,000 in the summer of 1996. The fee was decided by a tribunal after Piper had turned down Wimbledon's contract offer. He scored an injury-time volleyed winner on his debut on the opening day of the season, completing a 3–2 victory over Bristol City, having come on as a substitute in the 83rd minute. He only made four starts in the 1996–97 season but appeared as a substitute on 15 occasions. He also scored his only other goal for Gillingham in the Football League Trophy defeat to Cardiff City.

He made two brief substitute appearances in August 1997, a league game against Walsall and a League Cup game against Birmingham City in what proved to be his final appearance. He suffered a broken ankle in a reserve fixture against Fulham in March 1998 and then was released at the end of the 1997–98 campaign and dropped into non-league football. In total he had made 24 appearances for the Kent club, including 20 in The Football League. He was deployed mainly up front or out wide, but never really in his preferred central attacking position.

=== Non-league ===
It was not long after his leg came out of plaster that he learned of his release by Gillingham and then he initially had to train on his own in order to keep fit. He joined Brentford and Brighton & Hove Albion for pre-season training, but was told that he was not fit enough. He spoke to Football Conference side Welling United to see if he could train with them but ended up signing for them and made his league debut for them in the opening game of the campaign against Rushden & Diamonds. However, it did not go to plan and he was substituted before half time in what proved to be his only appearance for the club, due to a lack of fitness.

After leaving Welling, he signed for Isthmian League Premier Division side St Albans City but continued to train with Third Division side Barnet, who were full-time, to improve his fitness. He gave up the Barnet training just before Christmas 1998 as he had started picking up injury niggles. Piper proved a fans' favourite at St Albans City, making 98 appearances and scoring 28 goals in just two seasons at the club. He was named Player of the Year in the 1999–2000 campaign and was also named in the Isthmian League Team of the Year.

In June 2000, he was on the move again when he signed for fellow Isthmian League Premier side Farnborough Town after his contract had expired at St Albans. St Albans re-engaged in Piper's registration and offered to make him the highest paid player, but were unable to negotiate a deal and a tribunal had to settle the transfer fee. He stated that he "wanted to stay at St Albans, but I felt they didn't do enough to show they wanted to keep me." He said that his move to Farnborough wasn't motivated by money as his brother, Chris, had recently signed for St Albans and also his best friend, Michael Mison had joined. In the 2000–01 season he scored 25 goals as Farnborough won the league title. During the 2001–02 campaign in the Football Conference, Piper scored 19 goals as they finished in 7th position. Piper became a fan favourite and was affectionately known as "Sir Lenny". He scored 16 times during the 2002–03 season as Farnborough also had a record-breaking campaign in the FA Cup, reaching the fourth round where they met Arsenal at Highbury. He came on as a late substitute in 5–1 defeat.

Piper left Farnborough in the summer of 2003 when he signed for fellow Football Conference side Dagenham & Redbridge re-uniting with his brother, Chris. In November 2003, he was loaned out to divisional rivals Margate for three months, joining the club as a replacement for the recently departed Terry McFlynn. He made his debut on 22 November 2003 in a 2–1 defeat to Burton Albion, scoring in the process with a fine chipped goal. He started six of Margate's next seven games, scoring in a 1–1 draw at his old club Farnborough Town, where he received a warm reception. He scored this third goal in five outings in a 2–0 win at Aldershot Town. In January 2004, he missed four matches with a hamstring injury and his final appearance came against Halifax Town in February, before he was recalled by Dagenham & Redbridge a week before his scheduled return. Following his return to Dagenham he made one final appearance before he was released by mutual consent in March 2004.

He subsequently signed for Southern League Division One East side Fisher Athletic in March 2004 following his release. He had a short loan spell at Isthmian League Premier Division outfit Tonbridge Angels in December 2004. He made four appearances before returning to Fisher. Fisher were named as champions at the end of the 2004–05 and moved up to the Isthmian League Premier. He scored 13 goals during the 2005–06 Isthmian League campaign as Fisher finished in the pla-offs and subsequently won promotion to the Conference South, beating Hampton & Richmond Borough in the final. He left Fisher in May 2007 when they ran into financial problems and the entire squad was released at the end of the 2006–07 season. Piper went on to make 123 appearances for the South East London side, many of them with his brother Chris, and even went on to have a brief spell as caretaker manager in November 2005.

He featured for Tonbridge Angels during their pre-season campaign in the summer of 2007 but eventually signed for Beckenham Town of the Kent League in October 2007, after a short spell out of football. In February 2008, he moved back up to the Isthmian League Premier Division when he signed for Ramsgate, making nine appearances and scoring once during the 2008–09 season as they lost out in the play-off semi-final to Staines Town. He re-joined Beckenham in the summer of 2008 but then in February 2009, he was on the move again when he signed for Isthmian League Division One South side Whyteleafe. He only played once for them before he retired from football at the age of 31.

== International career ==
Piper made five appearances for England Under-18s while at Wimbledon, scoring a hat-trick against Sweden in a European Under-18 Championship qualifying match in November 1995.

== Death ==
Piper's former club Gillingham announced on 28 January 2024 that he had died at the age of 46 after a long illness.

== Honours ==
Farnborough Town

- Isthmian League Premier Division: 2000–01

Fisher Athletic

- Southern Football League Division One East: 2004–05
- Isthmian League Premier Division play-offs: 2005–06
