= Billy Manuel =

English footballer

Personal information
- Full name: William Albert James Manuel
- Date of birth: 28 June 1969 (age 57)
- Place of birth: Hackney, England
- Height: 1.65 m (5 ft 5 in)
- Positions: Left back; midfielder

Youth career
- Chelsea
- –1987: Tottenham Hotspur

Senior career*
Years	Team	Apps	(Gls)
1987–1989	Tottenham Hotspur	0	(0)
1989–1991	Gillingham	87	(4)
1991–1994	Brentford	94	(1)
1994	Peterborough United	0	(0)
1994	→ Stevenage Borough (loan)	3	(0)
1994–1995	Cambridge United	10	(0)
1995–1996	Peterborough United	27	(2)
1996–1997	Gillingham	20	(0)
1997–1999	Barnet	31	(1)
1999–2000	Folkestone Invicta		
2001	Horsham		
2001	Grays Athletic		
2001–2002	Tonbridge Angels		
2002–2003	Bromley		
2003	Windsor & Eton		
2003–2004	Waltham Forest		
2004–2005	Metrogas		
- * Club domestic league appearances and goals

William Albert James Manuel (born 28 June 1969) is an English retired professional footballer, best remembered for his time as a left back and midfielder in the Football League with Brentford and Gillingham. His tenacious performances in midfield for Brentford led to the nickname 'Billy the Pit Bull'.

== Career ==
=== Gillingham ===
Manuel began his career in the youth systems at First Division clubs Chelsea and Tottenham Hotspur, before dropping down to the Third Division to sign for Gillingham on 10 February 1989. His addition to the squad failed to help the struggling club avoid relegation to the Fourth Division at the end of the 1988–89 season and Manuel remained at Priestfield for two more forgettable seasons before leaving in June 1991. He made 97 appearances and scored four goals for the Gills.

=== Brentford ===
Manuel moved back up to the Third Division to sign for Brentford in a £60,000 deal on 14 June 1991, to bring stability to the left back position. He made 45 appearances during the 1991–92 season and won the first silverware of his career when the Third Division title was clinched at the end of the campaign. In the newly renamed First Division, Manuel moved into the midfield and impressed enough to be voted the Brentford supporters' Player of the Year at the end of the season, though it would end in disappointment with relegation straight back to the Second Division. New manager David Webb installed Manuel as captain for the 1993–94 season and moved him to left back, though he gradually fell out of favour and was released in August 1994. Manuel made 115 appearances and scored two goals during three seasons with Brentford.

=== Peterborough United ===
Manuel signed for Second Division club Peterborough United on a short-term contract on 16 September 1994. He failed to make an appearance before joining Conference club Stevenage Borough on loan in late September 1994. He made three appearances before leaving Broadhall Way. Manual departed Stevenage on a permanent basis on 28 October 1994.

=== Cambridge United ===
Manuel transferred to Second Division strugglers Cambridge United on 28 October 1994 and signed a three-month contract. He made 12 appearances before a succession of red cards saw him sacked by the club.

=== Return to Peterborough United ===
Manuel re-signed for Peterborough United on 28 February 1995, four months after leaving the club. He made 35 appearances and scored five goals before leaving London Road for the final time on 25 January 1996.

=== Return to Gillingham ===
Manuel rejoined Gillingham, then flying high in the Third Division, on 26 January 1996. He helped the Gills to promotion to the Second Division with a second-place finish at the end of the 1995–96 season and made 11 appearances in 1996–97, before being released at the end of the campaign. In both his spells with Gillingham, Manuel made 118 appearances and scored four goals.

=== Barnet ===
Manuel dropped back down to the Third Division to sign for Barnet prior to the beginning of the 1997–98 season. He made 38 appearances and scored one goal before being released at the end of the 1998–99 season.

=== Non-League football ===
Manuel dropped into non-League football in 1999 and signed for Southern League First Division East club Folkestone Invicta and helped the club to promotion to the Premier Division in his first season. He also served as the club's assistant manager. Manuel was released as part of a cost-cutting exercise in December 2000. He moved on to play for Horsham, Grays Athletic, Tonbridge Angels, Bromley, Windsor & Eton, Waltham Forest and Metrogas before retiring in 2005.

== Personal life ==
After his retirement from football, Manuel spent a period living in the USA, before returning to his native Hackney to run a pub. He later worked in refurbishments.

== Career statistics ==
Appearances and goals by club, season and competition
Club	Season	League			FA Cup		League Cup		Other		Total	
Club	Season	Division	Apps	Goals	Apps	Goals	Apps	Goals	Apps	Goals	Apps	Goals
Gillingham	1988–89	Third Division	17	1	0	0	0	0	0	0	17	1
Gillingham	1989–90	Fourth Division	32	3	2	0	1	0	3 (Note: Appearances in Football League Trophy)	0	38	3
Gillingham	1990–91	Fourth Division	38	0	1	0	1	0	2	0	42	0
Gillingham	Total		87	4	3	0	2	0	5	0	97	4
Brentford	1991–92	Third Division	35	0	3	0	5	1	2	0	45	1
Brentford	1992–93	First Division	41	1	1	0	1	0	6 (Note: Appearances in Anglo-Italian Cup)	0	49	1
Brentford	1993–94	Second Division	18	0	0	0	2	0	1	0	21	0
Brentford	Total		94	1	4	0	8	1	9	0	115	2
Stevenage Borough (loan)	1994–95	Conference	2	0	—		—		1 (Note: Appearance in Conference League Cup)	0	3	0
Cambridge United	1994–95	Second Division	10	0	2	0	—		—		12	0
Peterborough United	1994–95	Second Division	14	1	—		—		—		14	1
Peterborough United	1995–96	Second Division	13	1	2	0	4	3	2	0	21	4
Peterborough United	Total		27	2	2	0	4	3	2	0	35	5
Gillingham	1995–96	Third Division	10	0	—		—		—		10	0
Gillingham	1996–97	Second Division	10	0	1	0	0	0	0	0	11	0
Gillingham	Total		107	4	4	0	2	0	5	0	118	4
Barnet	1997–98	Third Division	19	0	1	0	3	0	1	0	24	0
Barnet	1998–99	Third Division	12	1	0	0	1	0	1	0	14	1
Barnet	Total		31	1	1	0	4	0	2	0	38	1
Career total			271	9	13	0	18	4	19	0	321	13

== Honours ==
Brentford

- Football League Third Division: 1991–92

Gillingham

- Football League Third Division second-place promotion: 1995–96

Folkestone Invicta

- Southern League First Division East: 1999–00

Individual

- Brentford Supporters' Player of the Year: 1992–93
