= Murray Jones (footballer) =

English footballer, coach, and manager

Personal information
- Full name: Murray Lee Jones
- Date of birth: 7 October 1964 (age 62)
- Place of birth: Bexley, England
- Position: Forward

Team information
- Current team: Millwall U16 (head coach)

Youth career
- Southampton
- Luton Town
- Southend United

Senior career*
Years	Team	Apps	(Gls)
- Welling United
1984	Epsom & Ewell	4	(3)
- Greenwich Borough
1986–1987	Croydon		
1987–1989	Carshalton Athletic	108	(52)
1989–1990	Crystal Palace	0	(0)
1990–1991	Bristol City	0	(0)
1990	→ Doncaster Rovers (loan)	5	(0)
1991	Exeter City	20	(3)
1991–1992	Grimsby Town	28	(3)
1992–1993	Brentford	16	(0)
1993–1994	Sittingbourne		
1994	Guangdong Hongyuan	12	(3)
1994–1995	Farnborough Town	19	(2)
1995–1996	Frankwell		
1996–1997	Welling United	4	(0)
1997–1998	Sutton United		

Managerial career
- Crystal Palace (reserves)
- 2005: Crawley Town (reserves)
- 2005: Crawley Town (caretaker)
- * Club domestic league appearances and goals

Murray Lee Jones (born 7 October 1964) is an English retired professional footballer who played as a forward in the Football League for Grimsby Town, Exeter City, Brentford and Doncaster Rovers. After retiring as a player, he became a coach and manager. He currently U16 coach at Millwall.

== Playing career ==
=== Early years ===
Jones began his career with spells in the youth systems at Football League clubs Southampton and Luton Town, before being offered an apprenticeship at Fourth Division club Southend United. He signed a professional contract prior to the beginning of the 1982–83 season, but was released without making a first team appearance. Jones dropped into non-League football and played for Welling United, Epsom & Ewell, Greenwich Borough and Croydon, before starring for Isthmian League Premier Division club Carshalton Athletic, for whom he scored 52 goals in 108 appearances.

=== Football League (1989–1993) ===
Jones joined First Division club Crystal Palace in October 1989, but failed to make an appearance before departing at the end of the 1989–90 season. He dropped down to the Second Division to sign for Bristol City in August 1990, but failed to make a first team appearance while at Ashton Gate and departed to join Third Division club Exeter City for a £30,000 fee in January 1991. He scored three goals in 20 league appearances before departing at the end of the 1990–91 season. Jones impressed newly-promoted Second Division Division club Grimsby Town sufficiently for the Mariners to pay £50,000 for his services in July 1991. He failed to deliver, scoring only three goals in 28 league appearances during the 1991–92 season.

Jones signed for newly-promoted First Division club Brentford in a £75,000 deal in July 1992, as a replacement for the departed Dean Holdsworth. He struggled to hold down a place in the team and failed to score in 20 appearances before his contract was cancelled after the Bees' relegation back to the Second Division was confirmed at the end of the 1992–93 season.

=== Later career (1993–1998) ===
Jones signed for Southern League Premier Division club Sittingbourne during the 1993–94 season and was then one of five English players to move to China to sign for Jia-A League club Guangdong Hongyuan for the 1994 season, the inaugural campaign of professional football in the country. He played in 12 of the team's 22 league matches and scored three goals. Jones returned to England to sign for Conference club Farnborough Town in late 1994. He made 19 appearances and scored two goals during the 1994–95 season. He returned to the Far East to sign for Hong Kong First Division League club Frankwell for the 1995–96 season, but failed to inspire the team to better than a mid-table finish. Jones closed out his career back in non-League football in England with Welling United and Sutton United.

== Management and coaching career ==
Jones returned to Crystal Palace as a member of the club's academy staff in 1998. He held the positions of U17, U19 and reserve team manager before departing in 2005. Jones joined Conference club Crawley Town as first team coach and reserve team manager prior to the start of the 2005–06 season. He was promoted to assistant manager in September 2005, after the sacking of Dave Swindlehurst. The sacking of first team manager Francis Vines the following month saw Jones named as caretaker manager, but he departed the club by mutual consent on 26 October, having yet to preside over a match.

Jones coached at Championship club Reading's academy during the 2005–06 season and then joined Premier League club Fulham as an academy coach in June 2006. He served in the U12, U13 and U14 managerial positions before leaving at the end of the 2010–11 season. In tandem with his role at Fulham, Jones was academy manager at Conference South club Bromley between July 2007 and June 2012. He was also first team boss Mark Goldberg's assistant manager during the 2011–12 season. Between June and December 2012, Jones coached Championship club Brighton & Hove Albion's U12, U13, U14 and U15 academy players and held the role of U16 manager.

Jones joined Premier League club Queens Park Rangers as an academy coach in February 2013, assisting U15 coach Fitzroy Lewinson. He progressed to assist to development squad coach Paul Furlong. In 2016, Jones joined League One club Millwall as U16 coach. As of September 2022, he was the club's Lead Phase U15-U16 coach.

== Career statistics ==
Appearances and goals by club, season and competition
Club	Season	League			National Cup		League Cup		Other		Total	
Club	Season	Division	Apps	Goals	Apps	Goals	Apps	Goals	Apps	Goals	Apps	Goals
Epsom & Ewell	1983–84	Isthmian League First Division	4	3	—		—		—		4	3
Doncaster Rovers (loan)	1990–91	Fourth Division	5	0	—		—		—		5	0
Exeter City	1990–91	Third Division	20	3	—		—		—		20	3
Brentford	1992–93	First Division	16	0	0	0	2	0	2 (Note: Appearances in Anglo-Italian Cup)	0	20	0
Guangdong Hongyuan	1994	Jia-A League	12	3	—		—		—		12	3
Career total			57	9	0	0	2	0	2	0	61	9
