= Lee Luscombe =

English footballer

Personal information
- Full name: Lee James Luscombe
- Date of birth: 16 July 1971 (age 55)
- Place of birth: Guernsey
- Position: Forward

Youth career
- 1986–1989: Vale Recreation

Senior career*
Years	Team	Apps	(Gls)
1989–1991	Southampton	0	(0)
1991–1993	Brentford	42	(6)
1993–1994	Millwall	2	(0)
1993–1994	→ Sittingbourne (loan)	4	(0)
1994	Doncaster Rovers	8	(0)
Total		52	(6)
- * Club domestic league appearances and goals

Lee Luscombe (born 16 July 1971) is an English former professional footballer who played in the Football League, as a forward.

Born in Guernsey, he started his youth career with Vale Recreation before joining Southampton as a trainee. After a couple of years, he left Southampton and returned to his home island for a short period. He then returned to the UK and signed for Brentford along with fellow Guernsey player Grant Chalmers. After playing 42 games over a two-year period he moved onto Millwall and then a short loan spell at Sittingbourne. His spell in the UK came to an end after 8 games with Doncaster Rovers. He then returned to his home island of Guernsey and played locally for a while. He later had spells as a goalkeeping coach at Warrington Town and Runcorn Linnets.

== Honours ==
Brentford

- Football League Third Division: 1991–92
