= Dominic Naylor =

English footballer

Personal information
- Date of birth: 12 August 1970 (age 56)
- Place of birth: Watford, England
- Positions: Defender; midfielder

Senior career*
Years	Team	Apps	(Gls)
1988–1991	Watford	0	(0)
1989	→ Halifax Town (loan)	6	(1)
1991–1993	Barnet	51	(6)
1993–1995	Plymouth Argyle	85	(0)
1995–1996	Gillingham	31	(1)
1996–1998	Leyton Orient	95	(5)
1998–2000	Stevenage Borough		
1999	→ Dagenham & Redbridge (loan)		
2000	Dagenham & Redbridge		
2000–2002	Basingstoke Town		
2002–2006	St Albans City		
- * Club domestic league appearances and goals

Dominic Naylor (born 12 August 1970) is an English former footballer who played as a left-sided defender and midfielder.
