= Grant Chalmers =

Footballer (born 1969)

Personal information
- Full name: Grant Chalmers
- Date of birth: 12 September 1969 (age 57)
- Place of birth: Guernsey
- Position: Midfielder

Senior career*
Years	Team	Apps	(Gls)
- Northerners
1992–1993	Brentford	11	(1)
1993	Doncaster Rovers	0	(0)
- Sylvans

International career
- Guernsey
- * Club domestic league appearances and goals

Grant Chalmers (born 12 September 1969) is a retired Guernsey professional footballer who played as a midfielder in the Football League for Brentford. He represented Guernsey at international level and later served as assistant manager at Northerners. He began cycling competitively in 2007 and together with teammate Aaron Bailey, won the unlicensed category at the 2009 Duo Normand.

== Career statistics ==
Appearances and goals by club, season and competition
Club	Season	League			FA Cup		League Cup		Other		Total	
Club	Season	Division	Apps	Goals	Apps	Goals	Apps	Goals	Apps	Goals	Apps	Goals
Brentford	1992–93	First Division	11	1	1	0	1	0	4 (Note: Appearances in Football League Trophy)	0	17	1
Career total			11	1	1	0	1	0	4	0	17	1
