= Alan Nicholls =

English footballer

Personal information
- Date of birth: 23 August 1973
- Place of birth: Sutton Coldfield, England
- Date of death: 25 November 1995 (aged 22)
- Place of death: Peterborough, England
- Position: Goalkeeper

Youth career
- Wolverhampton Wanderers

Senior career*
Years	Team	Apps	(Gls)
1992–1993	Cheltenham Town	?	(?)
1993–1995	Plymouth Argyle	65	(0)
1995	Gillingham	0	(0)
1995	Stalybridge Celtic	1	(0)

International career
1994	England U21	1	(0)
- * Club domestic league appearances and goals

Alan Nicholls (23 August 1973 – 25 November 1995) was an English football goalkeeper.

== Career ==
Born in Sutton Coldfield, Nicholls started his career as a trainee at Wolverhampton Wanderers but never made the first team. He later played for non-league clubs Cradley Town and Cheltenham Town, before returning to the professional ranks when he was signed by Peter Shilton, who was then manager of Plymouth Argyle, for £15,000 before the start of the 1993/94 season. During his time at Plymouth, Nicholls's form was so impressive that Shilton felt forced to play him - even though Shilton was himself chasing the 1,000 league appearances record (which he finally achieved at Leyton Orient in December 1996).

After his first season in professional football, during which Plymouth just missed out on promotion to Division One, Nicholls was called up to the England Under-21 team and played in the Toulon Tournament in the summer of 1994.

In his two years at Plymouth, Nicholls played 79 games for the club, gaining a reputation as a brilliant but larger-than-life footballer who was often in trouble off the pitch. After Shilton left Plymouth halfway through the 1994–95 season, Nicholls struggled with injuries and clashed with new manager Neil Warnock - who was keen to bring his own players into the club. At the beginning of the 1995–96 season, Nicholls was released by Warnock after a series of off-the-pitch indiscretions. He subsequently moved to Gillingham as cover for the more experienced Jim Stannard, making one appearance in a Football League Trophy match, and was still on trial at Priestfield Stadium when Football Conference side Stalybridge Celtic contacted the club to ask if they could borrow him to cover a suspension.

== Death ==
On 25 November 1995, Nicholls played for Stalybridge in a 3–1 win at Dover Athletic. After the game, Nicholls left with his friend Scott Lindsey, and Scott's brother, Matthew, and their father. Nicholls travelled in the car with Scott and his father, while Matthew followed on his motorbike. About an hour into their journey, Nicholls offered to travel on the back of Matthew's motorbike. Soon afterwards, Matthew lost control of the bike on the A1 near Peterborough and careered off the road. They were both killed instantly.

Nicholls is buried in the grounds of St Paul's Church, Halesowen. The Three Lions emblem of the England national team is engraved on his headstone, as well as an action shot of him in goal.

== Legacy ==
In a 2007 web poll, Nicholls was named Plymouth Argyle's second-best goalkeeper of all time, behind Jim Furnell, and is still remembered fondly by Plymouth fans.
