= Gareth Knott =

Welsh footballer

Personal information
- Full name: Gareth Knott
- Date of birth: 19 January 1976 (age 50)
- Place of birth: Blackwood, Wales
- Position: Midfielder

Youth career
- 1990–1996: Tottenham Hotspur

Senior career*
Years	Team	Apps	(Gls)
1996	Tottenham Hotspur	0	(0)
1995	→ Gillingham (loan)	5	(0)

International career
1996	Wales under-21	1	(0)
- * Club domestic league appearances and goals

Gareth Knott (born 19 January 1976) is a Welsh former professional footballer. He began his career with Tottenham Hotspur, joining tham at the age of 14. He made five appearances in the Football League during a loan spell with Gillingham in early 1995. He was released by Tottenham in 1996 having never broken into the first team and returned to his native Wales, where he played for a number of semi-professional teams. He gained one cap for Wales under-21.
