= Kevin Rattray =

English footballer

Kevin Winston Rattray (born 6 October 1968) is an English former professional footballer.

Born in Tottenham, he began his career with Broadfields United of the Middlesex County League. In 1993, he joined Woking, and two years later signed for Gillingham of the Football League Third Division for a transfer fee of £5,000. He made 31 appearances for the Kent-based club, scoring three goals, before moving to Barnet in September 1996 for a fee of £15,000. In 1998, he dropped back into non-league football with Kingstonian.

== Honours ==
Woking

- FA Trophy: 1993–94, 1994–95
