= Andy Ramage =

English footballer

Andrew William Ramage (born 3 October 1974) is an English former footballer. He made 13 appearances in The Football League for Gillingham.

After being forced to retire due to injury, he began working in oil brokerage in the City of London. He has subsequently become a self-help author, publishing the book "The 28 Day Alcohol-Free Challenge".
