= Dave Puttnam =

English footballer

David Paul Puttnam (born 3 February 1967) is an English former professional footballer. He played for Leicester City, Lincoln City, Swansea City and Gillingham between 1989 and 1998.

He moved on to join Yeovil Town on loan, debuting in the club's 1–0 home Isthmian League victory over Bishop's Stortford on 5 April 1997. He made eight appearances for Yeovil Town as they secured the Isthmian League title. In August 1997 he joined Swansea City where he appeared in all of the club's opening fixtures until an Achilles tendon injury forced him to miss the home game with Torquay United on 5 September 1997. His one-month contract with the club expired after the game and the club's then boss Jan Molby elected not to extend the deal and Puttnam was released.

A wish to play more local football saw Puttnam join Barwell in July 2001. After two seasons with the club he joined Coalville Town for the 2003–04 season. He moved on to join Quorn, debuting in the club's 0–0 home Midland Alliance draw with Boldmere St. Michaels on 20 March 2004. He then spent the 2004–05 and 2005–06 seasons playing for Ratby Sports.
