= Adrian Foster (footballer) =

English footballer and manager

Personal information
- Full name: Adrian Michael Foster
- Date of birth: 19 March 1971 (age 55)
- Place of birth: Kidderminster, England
- Position: Striker

Senior career*
Years	Team	Apps	(Gls)
1989–1992	West Bromwich Albion	27	(2)
1992–1994	Torquay United	65	(24)
1994–1996	Gillingham	40	(9)
1996	→ Exeter City (loan)	7	(0)
1996–1997	Hereford United	43	(16)
1997–1999	Rushden & Diamonds	55	(25)
1999–2000	Yeovil Town	28	(9)
2000–2001	Forest Green Rovers	32	(8)
2001–2003	Bath City	42	(15)
2003	Frome Town	1	(0)
2003–2004	Taunton Town	17	(10)
2004–2005	Street	?	(13)
2005–2006	Chard Town	30	(16)

Managerial career
- 2007–2013: Gillingham Town
- 2013–2015: Frome Town
- * Club domestic league appearances and goals

Adrian Foster (born 19 March 1971 in Kidderminster) is an English footballer and manager. He played several seasons in the Football League during the 1990s before dropping down into non-league football.

In December 2013, he was appointed manager of Frome Town having previously managed Gillingham Town. Six months after arriving at Frome as manager, he was rewarded with a new two-year contract in May 2014.
