= Mark Harris (English footballer) =

English footballer

Personal information
- Full name: Mark Andrew Harris
- Date of birth: 15 July 1963 (age 63)
- Place of birth: Reading, England
- Position: Defender

Senior career*
Years	Team	Apps	(Gls)
- Wokingham Town
1988–1989	Crystal Palace	2	(0)
1989	→ Burnley (loan)	4	(0)
1989–1995	Swansea City	228	(14)
1995–1997	Gillingham	65	(3)
1997–1998	Cardiff City	38	(1)
1998–2001	Kingstonian	66	(6)
- Henley Town
- Bromley
Total		403	(24)
- * Club domestic league appearances and goals

Mark Andrew Harris (born 15 July 1963) is an English former professional footballer who played as a defender.

== Career ==
He began his career with Wokingham Town before signing for Crystal Palace in June 1988. He had a brief loan spell at Burnley and made only two appearances for Palace, both as a substitute, in their 1988–89 promotion season. In 1989, he moved on to Swansea City, for whom he made 228 appearances, scoring 14 goals between then and 1995. Whilst at Swansea he was part of the team that won the 1994 Football League Trophy Final after a penalty shootout. He later played for Gillingham and Cardiff City and made over 300 total appearances in the English Football League. He later played in non-league football for Kingstonian, Henley Town and Bromley.

== Honours ==
Swansea City

- Football League Trophy: 1993–94
