= 1994–95 Brentford F.C. season =

English football team season

Brentford
1994–95 season
- Chairman: Martin Lange
- Manager: David Webb
- Stadium: Griffin Park
- Second Division: 2nd
- Play-offs: Semi-finals
- FA Cup: First round
- League Cup: Second round
- Football League Trophy: Second round
- Top goalscorer: League: Forster (24); All: Forster (26)
- Highest home attendance: 9,562
- Lowest home attendance: 4,031
- Average home league attendance: 6,076
Home colours	Away colours

During the 1994–95 English football season, Brentford competed in the Football League Second Division. After a runners-up finish in the league, club's season ended with defeat in the 1995 play-off semi-finals.

== Season summary ==
Brentford entered the 1994–95 Second Division season with the nucleus of a new squad, built since the breakup of the team which was relegated from the First Division at the end of the 1992–93 season. Forward Nicky Forster was manager David Webb's only significant summer signing, a £200,000 buy from Third Division Gillingham.

Eight wins and four defeats from the opening 12 games saw the Bees placed 4th in the league, before four defeats in the next five matches dropped the club into mid-table. By early December 1994, first and second round exits from the three cup competitions lightened the fixture load and Brentford set off on a 14-match unbeaten run, winning 10 matches and racking up notable 7–0 and 6–0 victories over Plymouth Argyle and Cambridge United respectively. The victory over Cambridge United in late January 1995 returned the Bees to the top of the table for the first time since the opening day of the season, when five goals were put past Plymouth Argyle at Home Park. Twin strikers Nicky Forster and Robert Taylor were in imperious form, scoring over half the team's goals and forming a partnership that came to be known as the 'FT Index'. The pair saw to it that Brentford finished the 1994–95 season as the only club in the top four divisions with two players scoring 20 league goals or more.

The unbeaten run came to an end with defeat to Shrewsbury Town on 25 February, but another 11-match unbeaten sequence kept Brentford in top spot going into late April. Brentford's good form ran in tandem with that of Birmingham City's and the Blues topped the table for the first time in eight weeks on 19 April, with the Bees returning to the summit three days later after a 2–0 victory over Cardiff City. Due to a restructuring of the English league system, only top spot in the 1994–95 Second Division offered automatic promotion, which placed heavy emphasis on a "winner takes all" fixture between Birmingham City and Brentford on at St Andrew's on 26 April. A 2–0 defeat for Brentford in front of a 25,581 crowd (the Second Division's record attendance for the season), plus a home defeat to Bournemouth and a draw away with Bristol Rovers in the final two matches, led to a runners-up finish and a place in the play-offs. The Bees met fifth-placed Huddersfield Town in the play-off semi-finals and were knocked out on penalties at Griffin Park after a 2–2 draw on aggregate, with captain Jamie Bates seeing his decisive spot kick saved.

A number of club records were set or equalled during the season:

- Fewest Football League goals conceded in a season: 39 (equalled club record)
- Most clean sheets kept in a Football League season: 22 (equalled club record)
- Most goalscorers in a Football League match: 6 – Darren Annon, Paul Smith, Robert Taylor, Nicky Forster, Denny Mundee and Lee Harvey (versus Plymouth Argyle, 17 December 1994)

== League table ==
Pos	Team	Pld	W	D	L	GF	GA	GD	Pts	Promotion or relegation
1	Birmingham City (C, P)	46	25	14	7	84	37	+47	89	Promotion to the First Division
2	Brentford	46	25	10	11	81	39	+42	85	Qualification for the Second Division play-offs
3	Crewe Alexandra	46	25	8	13	80	68	+12	83	Qualification for the Second Division play-offs
4	Bristol Rovers	46	22	16	8	70	40	+30	82	Qualification for the Second Division play-offs
5	Huddersfield Town (O, P)	46	22	15	9	79	49	+30	81	Qualification for the Second Division play-offs

(C) Champions; (O) Play-off winners; (P) Promoted

== Results ==
Brentford's goal tally listed first.

=== Legend ===
Win	Draw	Loss

=== Pre-season and friendlies ===
Date	Opponent	Venue	Result	Scorer(s)
18 July 1994	Bournemouth	A	4–1	Mundee (2), Smith, McGhee
20 July 1994	Dulwich Hamlet	A	5–0	Forster (2), Taylor (2), Annon
23 July 1994	Chertsey Town	A	3–2	Harvey, Forster, Mundee
25 July 1994	Hampton	A	7–1	Benjamin (3), Forster, Ashby, Smith, Ratcliffe
27 July 1994	Welling United	A	4–0	Forster, Taylor, Mundee (pen), Annon
29 July 1994	Portsmouth	H	1–2	Taylor
3 August 1994	Queens Park Rangers	H	0–0	
6 August 1994	Kettering Town	A	2–0	Annon, Grainger (pen)
9 August 1994	Bromley	A	2–0	McGhee, Benjamin
29 October 1994	Windsor & Eton	A	7–0	Taylor (5), Asaba, Ansah
8 May 1995	Barnet	A	5–4	Forster (2), Taylor (2), Hurdle

=== Football League Second Division ===
No.	Date	Opponent	Venue	Result	Attendance	Scorer(s)
1	13 August 1994	Plymouth Argyle	A	5–1	7,976	Smith, Forster (2), Stephenson, Taylor
2	20 August 1994	Peterborough United	H	0–1	5,561	
3	27 August 1994	Stockport County	A	1–0	4,399	Taylor
4	30 August 1994	Rotherham United	H	2–0	4,031	Taylor, Forster
5	3 September 1994	Wrexham	H	0–2	5,820	
6	10 September 1994	Wycombe Wanderers	A	3–4	6,847	Taylor, Stephenson, Cousins (og)
7	13 September 1994	York City	A	1–2	2,836	Taylor
8	17 September 1994	Blackpool	H	3–2	4,157	Forster, Smith, Grainger (pen)
9	24 September 1994	Crewe Alexandra	A	2–0	3,839	Forster, Taylor
10	1 October 1994	Shrewsbury Town	H	1–0	4,556	Taylor
11	8 October 1994	Bristol Rovers	H	3–0	5,330	Forster (2), Taylor
12	15 October 1994	Bournemouth	A	1–0	4,411	Forster
13	22 October 1994	Birmingham City	H	1–2	7,779	Ward (og)
14	29 October 1994	Cambridge United	A	0–0	3,102	
15	2 November 1994	Bradford City	A	0–1	4,105	
16	5 November 1994	Hull City	H	0–1	5,455	
17	19 November 1994	Huddersfield Town	A	0–1	10,889	
18	26 November 1994	Brighton & Hove Albion	H	2–1	4,728	Ashby, Ansah
19	10 December 1994	Peterborough United	A	2–2	4,102	Taylor, Forster
20	17 December 1994	Plymouth Argyle	H	7–0	4,492	Annon, Smith, Taylor (2), Forster, Mundee, Harvey
21	26 December 1994	Leyton Orient	H	3–0	6,125	Mundee, Ratcliffe, Forster
22	27 December 1994	Chester City	A	4–1	2,261	Forster (3), Grainger
23	31 December 1994	Oxford United	H	2–0	7,125	Forster, Taylor
24	2 January 1995	Cardiff City	A	3–2	5,235	Harvey, Forster, Taylor
25	14 January 1995	Swansea City	H	0–0	7,211	
26	21 January 1995	Hull City	A	2–1	3,823	Mundee, Grainger
27	28 January 1995	Cambridge United	H	6–0	6,390	Forster, Taylor (2), Grainger, Bailey (2)
28	4 February 1995	Brighton & Hove Albion	A	1–1	9,499	Bailey
29	11 February 1995	Bradford City	H	4–3	6,019	Mundee, Taylor, Grainger, Forster
30	17 February 1995	Swansea City	A	2–0	3,935	Forster (2)
31	21 February 1995	Huddersfield Town	H	0–0	9,562	
32	25 February 1995	Shrewsbury Town	A	1–2	4,570	Forster
33	4 March 1995	Crewe Alexandra	H	2–0	7,143	Mundee, Taylor
34	7 March 1995	Wrexham	A	0–0	2,834	
35	11 March 1995	Stockport County	H	1–0	6,513	Taylor
36	18 March 1995	Rotherham United	A	2–0	2,968	Forster, Abrahams
37	21 March 1995	Wycombe Wanderers	H	0–0	9,530	
38	25 March 1995	Blackpool	A	2–1	4,663	Bates, Taylor
39	1 April 1995	York City	H	3–0	6,474	Grainger, Forster, Taylor
40	8 April 1995	Oxford United	A	1–1	7,800	Taylor
41	15 April 1995	Chester City	H	1–1	8,020	Abrahams
42	17 April 1995	Leyton Orient	A	2–0	4,459	Bates, Forster
43	22 April 1995	Cardiff City	H	2–0	8,268	Grainger (pen), Taylor
44	26 April 1995	Birmingham City	A	0–2	25,581	
45	29 April 1995	Bournemouth	H	1–2	10,079	Abrahams
46	6 May 1995	Bristol Rovers	A	2–2	8,501	McGhee, Taylor

=== Football League Second Division play-offs ===
Round	Date	Opponent	Venue	Result	Attendance	Scorer(s)
SF (1st leg)	14 May 1995	Huddersfield Town	A	1–1	14,160	Forster
SF (2nd leg)	17 May 1995	Huddersfield Town	H	1–1 (a.e.t.), (drew 2–2 on aggregate, lost 4–3 on penalties)	11,161	Grainger (pen)

=== FA Cup ===
Round	Date	Opponent	Venue	Result	Attendance	Scorer(s)
R1	12 November 1994	Cambridge United	A	2–2	3,353	Annon, Taylor
R1 (replay)	22 November 1994	Cambridge United	H	1–2	4,096	Grainger

=== League Cup ===
Round	Date	Opponent	Venue	Result	Attendance	Scorer(s)
R1 (1st leg)	16 August 1994	Colchester United	A	2–0	2,521	Stephenson, Taylor
R2 (2nd leg)	23 August 1994	Colchester United	H	2–0 (won 4–0 on aggregate)	2,315	Parris, Smith
R2 (1st leg)	20 September 1994	Tranmere Rovers	A	0–1	3,754	
R2 (2nd leg)	27 September 1994	Tranmere Rovers	H	0–0 (lost 1–0 on aggregate)	4,076	

=== Football League Trophy ===
Round	Date	Opponent	Venue	Result	Attendance	Scorer(s)
SR1 (match 1)	19 October 1994	Brighton & Hove Albion	A	1–0	1,104	Forster
SR1 (match 2)	8 November 1994	Gillingham	H	3–1	1,795	Annon, Asaba, Ansah
SR2	3 December 1994	Oxford United	H	1–2	2,410	Grainger (pen)

- Source: Statto, The Big Brentford Book Of The Nineties

== Playing squad ==
Players' ages are as of the opening day of the 1994–95 season.

No.	Pos.	Name	Nat.	Date of birth (age)	Signed from	Signed in	Notes
Goalkeepers
1	GK	Kevin Dearden	(England)	8 March 1970 (aged 24)	Tottenham Hotspur	1993	
20	GK	Tamer Fernandes	(England)	7 December 1974 (aged 19)	Youth	1993	
25	GK	Neil Mason	(England)	29 October 1973 (aged 20)	—	—	Assistant physiotherapist
Defenders
2	DF	Brian Statham	(England)	21 May 1969 (aged 25)	Tottenham Hotspur	1992	
3	DF	Martin Grainger	(England)	23 August 1972 (aged 21)	Colchester United	1993	
4	DF	Barry Ashby	(England)	21 November 1970 (aged 23)	Watford	1994	
5	DF	Shane Westley	(England)	16 June 1965 (aged 29)	Wolverhampton Wanderers	1992	Loaned to Southend United
6	DF	Carl Hutchings	(England)	24 September 1974 (aged 19)	Youth	1993	
12	DF	Jamie Bates (c)	(England)	24 February 1968 (aged 26)	Youth	1986	
19	DF	Gus Hurdle	(Barbados)	14 October 1973 (aged 20)	Carshalton Athletic	1993	
21	DF	Corey Campbell	(England)	6 March 1976 (aged 18)	Youth	1994	
Midfielders
7	MF	Lee Harvey	(England)	21 December 1966 (aged 27)	Nottingham Forest	1993	
8	MF	Paul Smith	(England)	18 September 1971 (aged 22)	Southend United	1993	
10	MF	Darren Annon	(England)	17 February 1972 (aged 22)	Carshalton Athletic	1994	
14	MF	Denny Mundee	(England)	10 October 1968 (aged 25)	Bournemouth	1993	
17	MF	Simon Ratcliffe	(England)	8 February 1967 (aged 27)	Norwich City	1989	
18	MF	Paul Stephenson	(England)	2 January 1968 (aged 26)	Millwall	1993	
22	MF	Jon Hooker	(England)	31 March 1972 (aged 22)	Gillingham	1994	
23	MF	Paul Abrahams	(England)	31 October 1973 (aged 20)	Colchester United	1995	
Forwards
9	FW	Nicky Forster	(England)	8 September 1973 (aged 20)	Gillingham	1994	
11	FW	Robert Taylor	(England)	30 April 1971 (aged 23)	Leyton Orient	1994	
13	FW	Craig Ravenscroft	(England)	20 December 1974 (aged 19)	Youth	1993	Loaned to Woking
16	FW	David McGhee	(England)	19 June 1976 (aged 18)	Youth	1994	
27	FW	Carl Asaba	(England)	28 January 1973 (aged 21)	Dulwich Hamlet	1994	Loaned to Colchester United
Players who left the club mid-season
15	FW	Ian Benjamin	(England)	11 December 1961 (aged 32)	Luton Town	1993	Released
~~23~~	FW	Dennis Bailey	(England)	13 December 1965 (aged 28)	Queens Park Rangers	1995	Returned to Queens Park Rangers after loan
~~23~~	FW	Andy Ansah	(England)	19 March 1969 (aged 25)	Southend United	1994	Returned to Southend United after loan
24	DF	George Parris	(England)	11 September 1964 (aged 29)	Birmingham City	1994	Returned to Birmingham City after loan

- Source:The Big Brentford Book Of The Nineties

== Coaching staff ==
Name	Role
(England) David Webb	Manager
(England) Kevin Lock	First Team Coach
(England) Roy Johnson	Physiotherapist
(England) Neil Mason	Assistant Physiotherapist
(England) Fergus Dignan	Medical Officer

== Statistics ==
=== Appearances and goals ===
Substitute appearances in brackets.

No.	Pos	Nat	Name	League		FA Cup		League Cup		FL Trophy		Playoffs		Total	
No.	Pos	Nat	Name	Apps	Goals	Apps	Goals	Apps	Goals	Apps	Goals	Apps	Goals	Apps	Goals
1	GK	(England)	Kevin Dearden	43	0	2	0	4	0	3	0	2	0	54	0
2	DF	(England)	Brian Statham	26 (10)	0	2	0	2	0	2	0	2	0	34 (10)	0
3	DF	(England)	Martin Grainger	36 (1)	7	2	1	2	0	3	1	2	1	45 (1)	10
4	DF	(England)	Barry Ashby	40	1	2	0	3	0	3	0	2	0	50	1
5	DF	(England)	Shane Westley	15 (1)	0	2	0	3	0	2	0	0	0	22 (1)	0
6	DF	(England)	Carl Hutchings	38 (1)	0	1 (1)	0	4	0	2 (1)	0	0 (1)	0	45 (4)	0
7	MF	(England)	Lee Harvey	24 (1)	2	2	0	4	0	2	0	0	0	32 (1)	2
8	MF	(England)	Paul Smith	35	3	2	0	4	1	1	0	2	0	44	4
9	FW	(England)	Nicky Forster	46	24	2	0	4	0	2 (1)	1	2	1	56 (1)	26
10	MF	(England)	Darren Annon	9 (1)	1	1	1	0	0	1 (1)	1	0	0	11 (2)	3
11	FW	(England)	Robert Taylor	43	23	2	1	4	1	2	0	2	0	53	25
12	DF	(England)	Jamie Bates	38	2	1	0	2	0	2	0	2	0	45	2
13	MF	(England)	Craig Ravenscroft	1	0	0	0	0	0	0 (1)	0	0	0	1 (1)	0
14	MF	(England)	Denny Mundee	22 (17)	5	1	0	0 (1)	0	2	0	1 (1)	0	26 (19)	5
15	MF	(England)	Ian Benjamin	1	0	—		0 (1)	0	—		—		1 (1)	0
16	MF	(England)	David McGhee	1 (6)	1	0	0	0	0	0	0	0	0	1 (6)	1
17	MF	(England)	Simon Ratcliffe	24 (1)	1	0	0	0 (1)	0	1	0	2	0	27 (2)	1
18	MF	(England)	Paul Stephenson	34	2	0	0	4	1	1	0	2	0	41	3
19	MF	(Barbados)	Gus Hurdle	7 (2)	0	0 (1)	0	2	0	1	0	0	0	10 (3)	0
20	GK	(England)	Tamer Fernandes	3 (1)	0	0	0	0	0	0 (1)	0	0	0	3 (2)	0
22	MF	(England)	Jon Hooker	0 (1)	0	—		—		0	0	0	0	0 (1)	0
23	MF	(England)	Paul Abrahams	7 (3)	3	—		—		—		1	0	8 (3)	3
27	FW	(England)	Carl Asaba	0	0	0	0	0	0	1	1	0	0	1	1
	Players loaned in during the season														
~~23~~	MF	(England)	Andy Ansah	2 (1)	1	—		—		2	1	—		4 (1)	2
~~23~~	FW	(England)	Dennis Bailey	6	3	—		—		—		—		6	3
24	MF	(England)	George Parris	5	0	—		2	1	—		—		7	1

- Players listed in italics left the club mid-season.
- Source: The Big Brentford Book Of The Nineties

=== Goalscorers ===
No.	Pos.	Nat	Player	FL2	FAC	FLC	FLT	FLP	Total
9	FW	(England)	Nicky Forster	24	0	0	1	1	26
11	FW	(England)	Robert Taylor	23	1	1	0	0	25
3	DF	(England)	Martin Grainger	7	1	0	1	1	10
14	MF	(England)	Denny Mundee	5	0	0	0	0	5
8	MF	(England)	Paul Smith	3	0	1	0	0	4
23	MF	(England)	Paul Abrahams	3	—	—	—	0	3
~~23~~	FW	(England)	Dennis Bailey	3	—	—	—	—	3
18	MF	(England)	Paul Stephenson	2	0	1	0	0	3
10	MF	(England)	Darren Annon	1	1	0	1	0	3
12	DF	(England)	Jamie Bates	2	0	0	0	0	2
7	MF	(England)	Lee Harvey	2	0	0	0	0	2
~~23~~	FW	(England)	Andy Ansah	1	—	—	1	—	2
4	DF	(England)	Barry Ashby	1	0	0	0	0	1
16	MF	(England)	David McGhee	1	0	0	0	0	1
17	MF	(England)	Simon Ratcliffe	1	0	0	0	0	1
27	FW	(England)	Carl Asaba	0	0	0	1	0	1
24	MF	(England)	George Parris	0	—	1	—	—	1
Opponents				2	0	0	0	0	2
Total				81	3	4	5	2	95

- Players listed in italics left the club mid-season.
- Source: The Big Brentford Book Of The Nineties

=== Management ===
Name	Nat	From	To	Record All Comps					Record League				
Name	Nat	From	To	P	W	D	L	W %	P	W	D	L	W %
David Webb	(England)	13 August 1994	17 May 1995	57	29	14	14	50.88|	46	25	10	11	54.35

=== Summary ===
Games played	57 (46 Second Division, 2 FA Cup, 4 League Cup, 3 Football League Trophy, 2 Football League play-offs)
Games won	29 (25 Second Division, 0 FA Cup, 2 League Cup, 2 Football League Trophy, 0 Football League play-offs)
Games drawn	14 (10 Second Division, 1 FA Cup, 1 League Cup, 0 Football League Trophy, 2 Football League play-offs)
Games lost	14 (11 Second Division, 1 FA Cup, 1 League Cup, 1 Football League Trophy, 0 Football League play-offs)
Goals scored	95 (81 Second Division, 3 FA Cup, 4 League Cup, 5 Football League Trophy, 2 Football League play-offs)
Goals conceded	49 (39 Second Division, 4 FA Cup, 1 League Cup, 3 Football League Trophy, 2 Football League play-offs)
Clean sheets	21 (22 Second Division, 0 FA Cup, 3 League Cup, 1 Football League Trophy, 0 Football League play-offs)
Biggest league win	7–0 versus Plymouth Argyle, 17 December 1994
Worst league defeat	2–0 on 3 occasions
Most appearances	57, Nicky Forster (46 Second Division, 2 FA Cup, 4 League Cup, 3 Football League Trophy, 2 Football League play-offs)
Top scorer (league)	24, Nicky Forster
Top scorer (all competitions)	26, Nicky Forster

== Transfers & loans ==
Players transferred in
Date	Pos.	Name	Previous club	Fee	Ref.
17 June 1994	FW	(England) Nicky Forster	(England) Gillingham	£200,000	
9 August 1994	FW	(England) Carl Asaba	(England) Dulwich Hamlet	Free	
December 1994	FW	(England) Joe Omigie	(England) Donna	Free	
14 November 1994	MF	(England) Jon Hooker	(England) Gillingham	£5,000	
9 March 1995	MF	(England) Paul Abrahams	(England) Colchester United	£30,000	
Players loaned in
Date from	Pos.	Name	From	Date to	Ref.
8 August 1994	DF	(England) George Parris	(England) Birmingham City	September 1994	
November 1994	FW	(England) Andy Ansah	(England) Southend United	December 1994	
26 January 1995	FW	(England) Dennis Bailey	(England) Queens Park Rangers	26 February 1995	
Players transferred out
Date	Pos.	Name	Subsequent club	Fee	Ref.
12 August 1994	FW	(England) Dean P. Williams	(England) Doncaster Rovers	£2,000	
Players loaned out
Date from	Pos.	Name	To	Date to	Ref.
9 September 1994	DF	(England) David Thompson	(England) Blackpool	November 1994	
December 1994	MF	(England) Craig Ravenscroft	(England) Woking	January 1995	
January 1995	DF	(England) Shane Westley	(England) Southend United	March 1995	
16 February 1995	FW	(England) Carl Asaba	(England) Colchester United	End of season	
Players released
Date	Pos.	Name	Subsequent club	Join date	Ref.
n/a	FW	(England) Matthew Metcalf	(England) Wroxham	n/a	
n/a	FW	(England) Dean A. Williams	(England) Stevenage Borough	August 1994	
August 1994	DF	(England) Billy Manuel	(England) Peterborough United	16 September 1994	
September 1994	MF	(England) Ian Benjamin	(England) Wigan Athletic	30 September 1994	
September 1994	MF	(England) Robbie Peters	(England) Carlisle United	November 1994	
November 1994	DF	(England) David Thompson	(England) Blackpool	November 1994	

== Kit ==
In February 1995, it was announced that Brentford had cancelled its sponsorship deal with KLM. As a result, the Hummel International home shirt was replaced by an unbranded replica, which was devoid of sponsorship.

Supplier: Hummel International (home shirt) / Core (home shorts & socks / away & goalkeeper kit)
Sponsor(s): KLM

Home kit 1 only until March 1995

Home 1	Home 2	Away	Goalkeeper	Goalkeeper

== Awards ==
- Supporters' Player of the Year: Jamie Bates
- Football League Second Division PFA Team of the Year: Nicky Forster
- Football League Second Division Manager of the Year: David Webb
