= 1993–94 Brentford F.C. season =

English football team season

Brentford
1993–94 season
- Chairman: Martin Lange
- Manager: David Webb
- Stadium: Griffin Park
- Second Division: 16th
- FA Cup: Second round
- League Cup: First round
- Football League Trophy: Quarter-final
- Top goalscorer: League: Allon (13); All: Allon (17)
- Highest home attendance: 6,848
- Lowest home attendance: 4,305
- Average home league attendance: 5,611
Home colours	Away colours

During the 1993–94 English football season, Brentford competed in the Football League Second Division. In a season of transition, a failure to win any of the final 16 league matches ended all hopes of a finish in the play-off places.

== Season summary ==
The 1993–94 season saw Brentford back in the Second Division after suffering relegation from the First Division at the first attempt. Former Chelsea manager David Webb replaced Phil Holder and immediately set about overhauling the squad, releasing 11 players and cancelling the contracts of Murray Jones, Neil Smilie and Detzi Kruszyński. 1992–93 top-scorer Gary Blissett left the club for a £350,000 fee settled by a tribunal, goalkeeper Graham Benstead and defender Terry Evans rejected new contracts and were made available for loan, while forward Joe Allon was transfer-listed. In came midfielder Paul Smith, forward Denny Mundee and youngster Scott Morgan from Bournemouth and non-League players Dean A. Williams and Dean P. Williams. Professional contracts were given to youth products Carl Hutchings, Craig Ravenscroft and Tamer Fernandes. Manager David Webb continued to strengthen the squad during the early months of the season, bringing in goalkeeper Kevin Dearden, defenders Martin Grainger and Gus Hurdle, midfielder Lee Harvey and forwards Ian Benjamin and Matthew Metcalf, with Terry Evans and Grant Chalmers leaving the club.

Brentford began the season with two wins from the first three matches to rise as high as 5th, before losing five of the next six to drop into the relegation places. Transfer-listed forward Joe Allon provided the catalyst for a revival, returning from a loan spell with Southend United to score 9 goals in eight games in all competitions and fire the Bees back up to 12th position by early November. His run was ended by a broken jaw suffered at the hands of teammate Mickey Bennett, who was immediately sacked by the club. Forward Denny Mundee stepped into the breach and scored 9 goals in as many games in all competitions to help elevate Brentford back into the play-off positions and the Football League Trophy quarter-finals. The run prompted Premier League club Southampton to offer David Webb their vacant manager's job, which Webb turned down. Two club records were set during the run – 11 consecutive away matches unbeaten in all competitions and 10 consecutive away league matches undefeated.

Brentford had risen to 5th in the table after a 4–1 win over Bristol Rovers on 12 February 1994, but a winless run of 16 matches to close out the season dropped the Bees to 16th. Webb had continued his rebuilding of the squad through the second half of the season, selling transfer-listed players Marcus Gayle, Joe Allon and Keith Millen, while bringing in defenders David Thompson and Barry Ashby, winger Darren Annon and forward Robert Taylor. Season-ending injuries to Taylor, Shane Westley, Ian Benjamin and suspensions incurred by Martin Grainger, David Thompson, Kevin Dearden and Brian Statham further hindered Webb's ability to pick a settled team.

== League table ==
Pos	Team	Pld	W	D	L	GF	GA	GD	Pts
14	Brighton & Hove Albion	46	15	14	17	60	67	−7	59
15	Rotherham United	46	15	13	18	63	60	+3	58
16	Brentford	46	13	19	14	57	55	+2	58
17	Bournemouth	46	14	15	17	51	59	−8	57
18	Leyton Orient	46	14	14	18	57	71	−14	56

== Results ==
Brentford's goal tally listed first.

=== Legend ===
Win	Draw	Loss

=== Pre-season and friendlies ===
Date	Opponent	Venue	Result	Attendance	Scorer(s)
20 July 1993	Fareham Town	A	3–0	n/a	Allon (2), Gayle
22 July 1993	St Albans City	A	4–1	n/a	Allon (2), Ravenscroft, Buckle
24 July 1993	Hampton	A	2–1	n/a	Ratcliffe, Chalmers
26 July 1993	Havant Town	A	3–1	n/a	M. Bennett, Westley, Millen
28 July 1993	Chesham United	A	2–1	n/a	Allon (2)
31 July 1993	Crystal Palace	H	1–3	n/a	Ratcliffe
3 August 1993	Farnborough Town	A	3–0	n/a	Allon (2), M. Bennett
4 August 1993	Welling United	A	0–1	n/a	
6 August 1993	Tottenham Hotspur	H	0–0	4,535	
8 August 1993	Colchester United	A	1–2	n/a	Ravenscroft
18 August 1993	Tamworth	A	2–2	n/a	D.A. Williams, Evans
1 September 1993	Walton & Hersham	A	4–0	n/a	Millen, Ravenscroft, D.A. Williams
21 September 1993	Chesham United	A	1–2	n/a	Peters
7 December 1993	Hailsham Town	A	10–3	n/a	Metcalf (4), Stephenson (3), Benjamin, Millen, G. Bennett
22 March 1994	Zambia	H	0–2	1,168	
26 April 1994	Hayes	A	2–2	n/a	Grainger, Peters
12 May 1994	Crystal Palace	H	5–3	n/a	Mundee, Peters, Metcalf

=== Football League Second Division ===
No.	Date	Opponent	Venue	Result	Attendance	Scorer(s)
1	14 August 1993	Exeter City	H	2–1	5,537	Allon, Gayle
2	21 August 1993	Blackpool	A	1–1	4,024	Allon
3	28 August 1993	Reading	H	1–0	6,848	Allon
4	31 August 1993	Hull City	A	0–1	4,517	
5	4 September 1993	Rotherham United	A	0–2	4,333	
6	11 September 1993	Swansea City	H	1–1	5,042	Ratcliffe
7	14 September 1993	Leyton Orient	H	0–1	5,149	
8	18 September 1993	Brighton & Hove Albion	A	1–2	5,734	D.A. Williams
9	25 September 1993	Port Vale	H	1–2	5,106	Gayle
10	2 October 1993	Cambridge United	A	1–1	3,612	Benjamin
11	9 October 1993	Hartlepool United	A	1–0	1,802	Benjamin
12	16 October 1993	Wrexham	H	2–1	5,801	Ratcliffe, Allon
13	23 October 1993	York City	A	2–0	3,513	Smith, Allon
14	30 October 1993	Barnet	H	1–0	5,873	Allon
15	2 November 1993	Cardiff City	H	1–1	4,756	Allon
16	6 November 1993	Plymouth Argyle	A	1–1	6,407	Allon
17	20 November 1993	Burnley	A	0–0	6,085	
18	27 November 1993	Huddersfield Town	A	3–1	4,544	Mundee (2 pens), Ravenscroft
19	11 December 1993	Blackpool	H	3–0	4,769	Gayle, Mundee (2)
20	18 December 1993	Exeter City	A	2–2	4,250	Gayle, Mundee (pen)
21	27 December 1993	Bournemouth	A	3–0	5,744	Mundee (pen), Harvey, og
22	29 December 1993	Bradford City	H	2–0	6,059	Ratcliffe, Smith
23	1 January 1994	Fulham	A	0–0	9,797	
24	3 January 1994	Stockport County	H	1–1	6,410	og
25	8 January 1994	Bristol Rovers	H	3–4	6,841	Mundee (3)
26	15 January 1994	Wrexham	A	2–1	3,701	Gayle, Bates
27	22 January 1994	Hartlepool United	H	1–0	6,334	Bates
28	29 January 1994	Barnet	A	0–0	2,502	
29	5 February 1994	York City	A	1–1	5,710	Mundee
30	12 February 1994	Bristol Rovers	A	4–1	5,685	Gayle, Allon (3)
31	19 February 1994	Reading	A	1–2	9,056	Thompson
32	22 February 1994	Hull City	H	0–3	4,361	
33	26 February 1994	Rotherham United	H	2–2	4,980	Mundee, Allon
34	5 March 1994	Swansea City	A	1–1	3,187	Harvey
35	12 March 1994	Brighton & Hove Albion	H	1–1	6,728	Ratcliffe
36	15 March 1994	Leyton Orient	A	1–1	3,185	Allon
37	19 March 1994	Port Vale	A	0–1	8,269	
38	26 March 1994	Cambridge United	H	3–3	5,052	Taylor, Statham, Grainger
39	29 March 1994	Stockport County	A	1–3	4,361	Annon
40	2 April 1994	Bournemouth	H	1–1	4,305	Grainger
41	4 April 1994	Bradford City	A	0–1	6,703	
42	9 April 1994	Fulham	H	1–2	6,638	Taylor
43	16 April 1994	Cardiff City	A	1–1	5,268	Harvey
44	23 April 1994	Plymouth Argyle	H	1–1	6,173	Smith
45	30 April 1994	Burnley	A	1–4	11,363	Ashby
46	7 May 1994	Huddersfield Town	H	1–2	4,483	Harvey

=== FA Cup ===
Round	Date	Opponent	Venue	Result	Attendance	Scorer(s)
R1	13 November 1993	VS Rugby	A	3–0	3,006	Allon (2, 1 pen), Gayle
R2	4 December 1993	Cardiff City	H	1–3	4,845	Gayle

=== League Cup ===
Round	Date	Opponent	Venue	Result	Attendance	Scorer(s)
R1 (1st leg)	17 August 1993	Watford	H	2–2	4,527	Peters, Westley
R1 (2nd leg)	24 August 1993	Watford	A	1–3 (lost 5–3 on aggregate)	4,937	Westley

=== Football League Trophy ===
Round	Date	Opponent	Venue	Result	Attendance	Scorer(s)
SR1 (match 1)	19 October 1993	Barnet	A	2–2	1,269	Allon (2)
SR1 (match 2)	9 November 1993	Wycombe Wanderers	H	2–3	3,165	Ratcliffe, Smith
SR2	30 November 1993	Hereford United	A	2–1	1,049	Mundee (2)
SQF	11 January 1994	Leyton Orient	A	0–1	3,683	

- Source: Statto, 11v11, The Big Brentford Book Of The Nineties

== Playing squad ==
Players' ages are as of the opening day of the 1993–94 season.

No.	Pos.	Name	Nat.	Date of birth (age)	Signed from	Signed in	Notes
Goalkeepers
1	GK	Dean P. Williams	(England)	5 January 1972 (aged 21)	Tamworth	1993	
20	GK	Tamer Fernandes	(England)	7 December 1974 (aged 18)	Youth	1993	Loaned to Wealdstone
28	GK	Kevin Dearden	(England)	8 March 1970 (aged 23)	Tottenham Hotspur	1993	
Defenders
2	DF	Brian Statham	(England)	21 May 1969 (aged 24)	Tottenham Hotspur	1992	
3	DF	Billy Manuel (c)	(England)	28 June 1969 (aged 24)	Gillingham	1991	
4	DF	Barry Ashby	(England)	21 November 1970 (aged 22)	Watford	1994	
5	DF	Shane Westley	(England)	16 June 1965 (aged 28)	Wolverhampton Wanderers	1992	
6	DF	Martin Grainger	(England)	23 August 1972 (aged 20)	Colchester United	1993	
12	DF	Jamie Bates	(England)	24 February 1968 (aged 25)	Youth	1986	
14	DF	David Thompson	(England)	20 November 1968 (aged 24)	Bristol City	1994	
18	DF	Carl Hutchings	(England)	24 September 1974 (aged 18)	Youth	1993	
19	DF	Gus Hurdle	(Barbados)	14 October 1973 (aged 19)	Dorchester Town	1993	Loaned to Dorchester Town
21	DF	Scott Morgan	(England)	22 March 1975 (aged 18)	Bournemouth	1993	
Midfielders
8	MF	Paul Smith	(England)	18 September 1971 (aged 21)	Southend United	1993	
9	MF	Lee Harvey	(England)	21 December 1966 (aged 26)	Nottingham Forest	1993	
10	MF	Paul Stephenson	(England)	2 January 1968 (aged 25)	Millwall	1993	
16	MF	Robbie Peters	(England)	18 May 1971 (aged 22)	Youth	1989	Loaned to Slough Town
17	MF	Simon Ratcliffe	(England)	8 February 1967 (aged 26)	Norwich City	1989	
22	MF	Kevin Watson	(England)	3 January 1974 (aged 19)	Tottenham Hotspur	1994	On loan from Tottenham Hotspur
24	MF	Darren Annon	(England)	17 February 1972 (aged 21)	Carshalton Athletic	1994	
Forwards
11	FW	Robert Taylor	(England)	30 April 1971 (aged 22)	Leyton Orient	1994	
13	FW	Craig Ravenscroft	(England)	20 December 1974 (aged 18)	Youth	1993	
15	FW	Dean A. Williams	(England)	14 November 1970 (aged 22)	St Albans City	1993	
23	FW	Denny Mundee	(England)	10 October 1968 (aged 24)	Bournemouth	1993	
26	FW	Matthew Metcalf	(England)	28 July 1969 (aged 24)	Diss Town	1993	
27	FW	Ian Benjamin	(England)	11 December 1961 (aged 31)	Luton Town	1993	
Players who left the club mid-season
~~4~~	DF	Keith Millen	(England)	26 September 1966 (aged 26)	Youth	1985	Transferred to Watford
~~6~~	MF	Grant Chalmers	(England)	12 September 1969 (aged 23)	Northerners	1992	Released
7	FW	Joe Allon	(England)	12 January 1966 (aged 27)	Chelsea	1992	Loaned to Southend United, transferred to Port Vale
~~9~~	FW	Mickey Bennett	(England)	27 July 1969 (aged 24)	Wimbledon	1992	Released
~~11~~	FW	Marcus Gayle	(Jamaica)	27 September 1970 (aged 22)	Youth	1988	Transferred to Wimbledon
~~14~~	MF	Paul Buckle	(England)	16 December 1970 (aged 22)	Youth	1988	Transferred to Torquay United
~~22~~	GK	Graham Benstead	(England)	20 August 1963 (aged 29)	Sheffield United	1990	Loaned to Kettering Town, transferred to Kettering Town
~~24~~	MF	Steve Tilson	(England)	27 July 1966 (aged 27)	Southend United	1993	Returned to Southend United after loan
25	MF	John Cornwell	(England)	13 October 1964 (aged 28)	Southend United	1993	Returned to Southend United after loan

- Source: The Big Brentford Book Of The Nineties

== Coaching staff ==
Name	Role
(England) David Webb	Manager
(England) Kevin Lock	First Team Coach
(England) Roy Johnson	Physiotherapist

== Statistics ==
=== Appearances and goals ===
Substitute appearances in brackets.

No.	Pos	Nat	Name	League		FA Cup		League Cup		FL Trophy		Total	
No.	Pos	Nat	Name	Apps	Goals	Apps	Goals	Apps	Goals	Apps	Goals	Apps	Goals
1	GK	(England)	Dean P. Williams	6 (1)	0	0	0	0	0	0	0	6 (1)	0
2	DF	(England)	Brian Statham	31	1	1	0	2	0	2	0	36	1
3	DF	(England)	Billy Manuel	17 (1)	0	0	0	2	0	0 (1)	0	19 (2)	0
~~4~~	DF	(England)	Keith Millen	0	0	0	0	0	0	1	0	1	0
4	DF	(England)	Barry Ashby	8	1	—		—		—		8	1
5	DF	(England)	Shane Westley	31	0	2	0	2	2	4	0	39	2
6	DF	(England)	Martin Grainger	31	2	2	0	—		—		33	2
7	FW	(England)	Joe Allon	21	13	1	2	2	0	2	2	26	17
8	MF	(England)	Paul Smith	32	3	2	0	0	0	4	1	38	4
~~9~~	FW	(England)	Mickey Bennett	6 (2)	0	—		2	0	—		8 (2)	0
9	MF	(England)	Lee Harvey	23 (3)	4	1	0	—		2	0	26 (3)	4
10	MF	(England)	Paul Stephenson	25	0	1 (1)	0	2	0	2	0	30 (1)	0
~~11~~	FW	(Jamaica)	Marcus Gayle	35	6	2	2	1	0	2	0	40	8
11	FW	(England)	Robert Taylor	5	2	—		—		—		5	2
12	DF	(England)	Jamie Bates	45	2	2	0	2	0	3	0	52	2
13	FW	(England)	Craig Ravenscroft	4 (3)	1	0	0	0	0	1 (1)	0	5 (4)	1
~~14~~	MF	(England)	Paul Buckle	0	0	0	0	1	0	0	0	1	0
14	DF	(England)	David Thompson	9 (1)	1	—		—		—		9 (1)	1
15	FW	(England)	Dean A. Williams	2 (1)	1	0	0	0	0	0	0	2 (1)	1
16	MF	(England)	Robbie Peters	8 (4)	0	0	0	1 (1)	1	2 (1)	0	11 (6)	1
17	MF	(England)	Simon Ratcliffe	41 (2)	4	1	0	2	0	4	1	48 (2)	5
18	DF	(England)	Carl Hutchings	20 (9)	0	2	0	1 (1)	0	4	0	27 (10)	0
20	GK	(England)	Tamer Fernandes	0 (1)	0	0	0	0	0	0	0	0 (1)	0
21	DF	(England)	Scott Morgan	1	0	0	0	0	0	2	0	3	0
~~22~~	GK	(England)	Graham Benstead	5	0	—		2	0	—		7	0
23	MF	(England)	Denny Mundee	37 (2)	11	2	0	0 (2)	0	2 (2)	2	41 (6)	13
24	MF	(England)	Darren Annon	5 (4)	1	—		—		—		5 (4)	1
26	FW	(England)	Matthew Metcalf	3 (4)	0	0	0	0	0	1 (1)	0	4 (5)	0
27	FW	(England)	Ian Benjamin	12 (2)	2	1	0	—		2	0	15 (2)	2
28	GK	(England)	Kevin Dearden	35	0	2	0	—		4	0	41	0
	Players loaned in during the season												
22	MF	(England)	Kevin Watson	2 (1)	0	—		—		—		2 (1)	0
~~24~~	MF	(England)	Steve Tilson	2	0	—		—		—		2	0
25	MF	(England)	John Cornwell	4	0	—		—		—		4	0

- Players listed in italics left the club mid-season.
- Source: The Big Brentford Book Of The Nineties

=== Goalscorers ===
No.	Pos.	Nat	Player	FL2	FAC	FLC	FLT	Total
7	FW	(England)	Joe Allon	13	2	0	2	17
23	FW	(England)	Denny Mundee	11	0	0	2	13
~~11~~	FW	(Jamaica)	Marcus Gayle	6	2	0	0	8
17	MF	(England)	Simon Ratcliffe	4	0	0	1	5
9	MF	(England)	Lee Harvey	4	0	—	0	4
8	MF	(England)	Paul Smith	3	0	0	1	4
11	FW	(England)	Robert Taylor	2	—	—	—	2
6	DF	(England)	Martin Grainger	2	0	—	—	2
27	FW	(England)	Ian Benjamin	2	0	—	0	2
12	DF	(England)	Jamie Bates	2	0	0	0	2
5	DF	(England)	Shane Westley	0	0	2	0	2
24	MF	(England)	Darren Annon	1	—	—	—	1
4	DF	(England)	Barry Ashby	1	—	—	—	1
14	DF	(England)	David Thompson	1	—	—	—	1
13	FW	(England)	Craig Ravenscroft	1	0	0	0	1
2	DF	(England)	Brian Statham	1	0	0	0	1
15	FW	(England)	Dean A. Williams	1	0	0	0	1
16	MF	(England)	Robbie Peters	0	0	1	0	1
Opponents				2	0	0	0	2
Total				57	4	3	6	70

- Players listed in italics left the club mid-season.
- Source: The Big Brentford Book Of The Nineties

=== Management ===
Name	Nat	From	To	Record All Comps					Record League				
Name	Nat	From	To	P	W	D	L	W %	P	W	D	L	W %
David Webb	(England)	14 August 1993	7 May 1994	54	15	21	18	27.78|	46	13	19	14	28.26

=== Summary ===
Games played	54 (46 Second Division, 2 FA Cup, 2 League Cup, 4 Football League Trophy)
Games won	15 (13 Second Division, 1 FA Cup, 0 League Cup, 1 Football League Trophy)
Games drawn	21 (19 Second Division, 0 FA Cup, 1 League Cup, 1 Football League Trophy)
Games lost	18 (14 Second Division, 1 FA Cup, 1 League Cup, 2 Football League Trophy)
Goals scored	70 (57 Second Division, 4 FA Cup, 3 League Cup, 6 Football League Trophy)
Goals conceded	70 (55 Second Division, 3 FA Cup, 5 League Cup, 7 Football League Trophy)
Clean sheets	12 (11 Second Division, 1 FA Cup, 0 League Cup, 0 Football League Trophy)
Biggest league win	3–0 on 2 occasions, 4–1 versus Bristol Rovers, 12 February 1994
Worst league defeat	3–0 versus Hull City, 22 February 1994; 4–1 versus Burnley, 30 April 1994
Most appearances	52, Jamie Bates (45 Second Division, 2 FA Cup, 2 League Cup, 3 Football League Trophy)
Top scorer (league)	13, Joe Allon
Top scorer (all competitions)	17, Joe Allon

== Transfers & loans ==
Players transferred in
Date	Pos.	Name	Previous club	Fee	Ref.
July 1993	FW	(England) Dean A. Williams	(England) St Albans City	£14,000	
6 August 1993	MF	(England) Paul Smith	(England) Southend United	Free	
8 August 1993	GK	(England) Dean P. Williams	(England) Tamworth	£2,000	
12 August 1993	MF	(England) Denny Mundee	(England) Bournemouth	Free	
August 1993	DF	(England) Scott Morgan	(England) Bournemouth	Free	
24 September 1993	FW	(England) Ian Benjamin	(England) Luton Town	£35,000	
30 September 1993	GK	(England) Kevin Dearden	(England) Tottenham Hotspur	Free	
September 1993	FW	(England) Matthew Metcalf	(England) Diss Town	£10,000	
21 October 1993	DF	(England) Martin Grainger	(England) Colchester United	£60,000	
October 1993	DF	(Barbados) Gus Hurdle	(England) Dorchester Town	Free	
18 November 1993	MF	(England) Lee Harvey	(England) Nottingham Forest	Free	
December 1993	MF	(England) Tony Sorrell	(England) Barnet	Free	
1 February 1994	DF	(England) David Thompson	(England) Bristol City	Free	
8 March 1994	MF	(England) Darren Annon	(England) Carshalton Athletic	£20,000	
22 March 1994	DF	(England) Barry Ashby	(England) Watford	£65,000	
24 March 1994	FW	(England) Robert Taylor	(England) Leyton Orient	£100,000	
Players loaned in
Date from	Pos.	Name	From	Date to	Ref.
16 September 1993	MF	(England) John Cornwell	(England) Southend United	9 November 1993	
16 September 1993	MF	(England) Steve Tilson	(England) Southend United	16 October 1993	
24 March 1994	MF	(England) Kevin Watson	(England) Tottenham Hotspur	End of season	
Players transferred out
Date	Pos.	Name	Subsequent club	Fee	Ref.
1993	FW	(England) Murray Jones	(England) Sittingbourne	Free	
1993	GK	(Republic of Ireland) Gerry Peyton	(England) West Ham United	Free	
23 July 1993	FW	(England) Gary Blissett	(England) Wimbledon	£350,000	
August 1993	MF	(England) Neil Smilie	(England) Gillingham	Free	
September 1993	MF	(Poland) Detzi Kruszyński	(England) Coventry City	Free	
October 1993	DF	(England) Terry Evans	(England) Wycombe Wanderers	£40,000	
December 1993	GK	(England) Graham Benstead	(England) Kettering Town	Free	
3 February 1994	MF	(England) Paul Buckle	(England) Torquay United	Free	
22 March 1994	DF	(England) Keith Millen	(England) Watford	£100,000	
24 March 1994	FW	(England) Joe Allon	(England) Port Vale	£150,000	
24 March 1994	FW	(Jamaica) Marcus Gayle	(England) Wimbledon	£250,000	
Players loaned out
Date from	Pos.	Name	To	Date to	Ref.
26 August 1993	DF	(England) Terry Evans	(England) Wycombe Wanderers	October 1993	
16 September 1993	FW	(England) Joe Allon	(England) Southend United	October 1993	
October 1993	GK	(England) Graham Benstead	(England) Kettering Town	December 1993	
October 1993	GK	(England) Tamer Fernandes	(England) Wealdstone	November 1993	
January 1994	MF	(England) Robbie Peters	(England) Slough Town	February 1993	
January 1994	MF	(England) Tony Sorrell	(England) Dagenham & Redbridge	Free	
February 1994	DF	(Barbados) Gus Hurdle	(England) Dorchester Town	April 1994	
Players released
Date	Pos.	Name	Subsequent club	Join date	Ref.
October 1993	MF	(England) Grant Chalmers	(England) Doncaster Rovers	1993	
17 November 1993	MF	(England) Mickey Bennett	(England) Charlton Athletic	24 March 1994	
30 June 1994	DF	(England) Scott Morgan	(England) Dorchester Town	1994	

== Kit ==
Supplier: Hummel International
Sponsor(s): KLM

Home	Away	Goalkeeper	Goalkeeper

Source: Historical Kits

== Awards ==
- Supporters' Player of the Year: Kevin Dearden
