= Denny Mundee =

English footballer

Personal information
- Full name: Dennis William John Mundee
- Date of birth: 10 October 1968 (age 58)
- Place of birth: Swindon, England
- Height: 1.78 m (5 ft 10 in)
- Position: Utility player

Youth career
- 1985–1986: Queens Park Rangers

Senior career*
| Years | Team | Apps | (Gls) |
| 1986–1987 | Swindon Town | 0 | (0) |
| 1987–1988 | Salisbury | 60 | (28) |
| 1988–1993 | Bournemouth | 100 | (6) |
| | → Weymouth (loan) | 3 | (0) |
| 1988–1989 | → Yeovil Town (loan) | 11 | (0) |
| 1989 | → Torquay United (loan) | 9 | (0) |
| 1993–1995 | Brentford | 84 | (16) |
| 1995–1997 | Brighton & Hove Albion | 56 | (7) |
| 1997 | Dorchester Town | 0 | (0) |
| | Salisbury City | 5 | (0) |
- Newport (IOW)
- Swindon Supermarine
- Clevedon Town
| 1998 | Bath City | 3 | (0) |
- * Club domestic league appearances and goals

Dennis William John Mundee (born 10 October 1968) is an English former professional footballer who made 100 appearances for both Bournemouth and Brentford in the Football League as a utility player. He is a cult hero amongst the Brentford supporters and is remembered chiefly for 'The Twiddle', a step over move copied from Glenn Roeder.

== Career ==
=== Early years ===
Mundee began his career in youth football in Swindon and represented the town's schoolboy team. Mundee was offered a two-year apprenticeship deal worth £5,000 by Harry Redknapp (manager of Third Division club Bournemouth), but he instead decided to sign for top-flight club Queens Park Rangers. Mundee's father kept the details of the Bournemouth transfer fee secret from his son, to help the young Mundee make a decision based on which club felt best for him and not influenced by money. Mundee failed to make a first team appearance for Rangers and moved to hometown Third Division club Swindon Town in August 1986, turning professional. He made 40 reserve and youth team appearances during the 1986–87 season and after his release he dropped into non-League football to join Southern League Premier Division club Salisbury.

=== Bournemouth ===
Mundee returned to the Football League to sign for Second Division club Bournemouth in March 1988. Early in his Bournemouth career, Mundee played on loan at Weymouth, Yeovil Town and Torquay United. He finally made his professional debut in a late 1988–89 season match away to Oldham Athletic. Over the course of the next five years, Mundee played every outfield position for the club and made 122 appearances, scoring 12 goals. He departed Dean Court on a free transfer in August 1993.

=== Brentford ===
Mundee signed for Second Division club Brentford on non-contract terms on 12 August 1993. He had been a transfer target of former manager Phil Holder during the 1992–93 season, but the move broke down. Mundee began life at Griffin Park under David Webb as a right back, filling in for the injured Brian Statham. After a training ground bust-up between Mickey Bennett and Joe Allon (which resulted in a broken jaw for Allon), Mundee was moved up front. The high-point of Mundee's Brentford career came in a home match against Bristol Rovers in January 1994, in which he scored a hat-trick in a 4–3 defeat. He finished the 1993–94 season as Brentford's second-leading goalscorer, with 13 goals.

Now behind the 'FT Index' (Nicky Forster and Robert Taylor) in the pecking order up front, Mundee was a regular off the bench in the first half of the 1994–95 season, before finally breaking into the starting line-up in November 1994. He made 45 appearances and scored five goals during a frustrating season, in which the Bees finished second in the Second Division, only to be forced to settle for a play-off place due to the reduction in size of the Premier League and its effect on the league pyramid. Brentford lost on penalties to Huddersfield Town in the semi-finals, with Mundee missing his spot kick in the second leg.

Mundee's relationship with manager David Webb soured during the 1995 off-season. While negotiating a new contract, Mundee requested a £5,000 signing-on fee, which would enable him to replace his car, in which he was driving 200 miles a day, commuting to Brentford from his Bournemouth home. Mundee was given a week-to-week contract and was released in October 1995, with the chairman citing budgetary concerns. Mundee became disillusioned with football, as Webb had insinuated in the local press that Mundee had been living an expensive lifestyle, when in reality his wages were £450 a week. Mundee made 100 appearances and scored 18 goals in just over two years at Griffin Park. Looking back in 2005, Mundee said "I can honestly say that the time I spent at Brentford means more to me than any other club I have been at".

=== Brighton and Hove Albion ===
Mundee moved to Second Division club Brighton & Hove Albion on a one-month contract on 19 October 1995. The manager who signed Mundee, Liam Brady, was soon sacked and Mundee's future was assured when former Bournemouth teammate Jimmy Case was appointed manager. Mundee made 62 appearances and scored eight goals during a terrible period for the Seagulls, which had seen the club plummet to the bottom of the Football League by the time he was released on 11 December 1997. Back and ankle injuries and weight gain brought about the end of his professional career.

=== Dorchester Town ===
Mundee attempted to resurrect his career by joining Southern League Premier Division club Dorchester Town in late 1997. However, with his contract still held by Brighton & Hove Albion, he was twice listed for his Dorchester Town debut, but was unable to play.

=== Non-League football ===
Mundee ended his career with a number of short spells in non-League football during the second half of the 1997–98 season, with a return to Salisbury City and short spells with Newport (IOW), Swindon Supermarine, Clevedon Town and Bath City.

== Personal life ==
Mundee grew up in Swindon, to parents from Shepherd's Bush, London. His brothers Barry and Brian also became footballers, with Brian playing league football for Bournemouth, Northampton Town and Cambridge United. As of 2005, Mundee was working as a self-employed exterior wall coating specialist, alongside his brother Brian.

== Career statistics ==
Appearances and goals by club, season and competition
| Club | Season | League | | | FA Cup | | League Cup | | Other | | Total | |
| Club | Season | Division | Apps | Goals | Apps | Goals | Apps | Goals | Apps | Goals | Apps | Goals |
|---|---|---|---|---|---|---|---|---|---|---|---|---|
| Torquay United | 1989–90 | Fourth Division | 9 | 0 | 0 | 0 | 0 | 0 | 0 | 0 | 9 | 0 |
| Brentford | 1993–94 | Second Division | 39 | 11 | 2 | 0 | 2 | 0 | 4 (Note: Appearances in Football League Trophy) | 2 | 47 | 13 |
| Brentford | 1994–95 | Second Division | 39 | 5 | 1 | 0 | 1 | 0 | 4 (Note: 2 appearances in Second Division play-offs, 2 appearances in Football League Trophy) | 0 | 45 | 5 |
| Brentford | 1995–96 | Second Division | 6 | 0 | — | | 2 | 0 | — | | 8 | 0 |
| Brentford | Total | | 84 | 16 | 3 | 0 | 5 | 0 | 8 | 2 | 100 | 18 |
| Brighton & Hove Albion | 1995–96 | Second Division | 32 | 3 | 4 | 0 | — | | 2 | 1 | 38 | 4 |
| Brighton & Hove Albion | 1996–97 | Third Division | 24 | 4 | 0 | 0 | 0 | 0 | 0 | 0 | 24 | 4 |
| Brighton & Hove Albion | Total | | 56 | 7 | 4 | 0 | 0 | 0 | 2 | 1 | 62 | 8 |
| Career total | | | 149 | 23 | 7 | 0 | 5 | 0 | 10 | 2 | 171 | 26 |
