= Darren Annon =

English footballer (born 1972)

Personal information
- Full name: Darren Carlton Annon
- Date of birth: 17 February 1972 (age 54)
- Place of birth: Chelsea, England
- Height: 5 ft 5 in (1.65 m)
- Positions: Defender; winger

Senior career*
Years	Team	Apps	(Gls)
1992–1994	Carshalton Athletic	59	(10)
1994–1996	Brentford	20	(2)
1996	Kingstonian	7	(3)
1996–2000	Enfield		
2000–2003	Farnborough Town	105	(1)
2003–2005	Margate	62	(1)
2005–2008	Havant & Waterlooville	37	(0)
2007–2008	→ Redbridge (loan)	4	(0)
2008	Redbridge	7	(0)
2008	Tooting & Mitcham United	0	(0)
2008–2009	Guildford City	4	(0)
2009	Banstead Athletic	10	(0)
2010–2012	Norton	16	(0)
Total		292	(17)
- * Club domestic league appearances and goals

Darren Carlton Annon (born 17 February 1972) is an English former professional footballer. He made 20 appearances in the Football League for Brentford and played the majority of his career with non-League clubs Enfield, Farnborough Town and Margate.

== Career ==
=== Carshalton Athletic ===
A winger, Annon began his career at Isthmian League Premier Division club Carshalton Athletic and made his debut in October 1992. He made a handful of appearances during the 1992–93 season and established himself during the 1993–94 season, scoring 10 goals and attracting interest from Football League clubs. Annon departed the club in March 1994.

=== Brentford ===
Annon's form for Carshalton Athletic earned him a £20,000 transfer to Second Division club Brentford in March 1994. He made 9 appearances during what remained of the 1993–94 season and scored his first Bees goal in a 3–1 defeat to Stockport County on 29 March.

Annon was largely out of favour during the early months of the 1994–95 season, until a double skull fracture suffered by Paul Stephenson in a match versus Bradford City on 2 November 1994 opened up a place in the team. Annon made his first start of the season in a Football League Trophy first round match against Gillingham on 8 November and celebrated his return to the team with the opening goal in a 3–1 victory. He started in the following game, an FA Cup first round match away to Cambridge United and scored the opening goal in a 2–2 draw. Annon made his first league start of the 1994–95 season in a 2–1 victory over Brighton & Hove Albion on 26 November 1994, which kicked off a run of 10 consecutive appearances. He scored his third goal of the season in a 7–0 win over Plymouth Argyle at Griffin Park on 17 December. Annon's final appearance of the season came in a 2–1 victory over Hull City on 21 January 1995. After Paul Stephenson's return to fitness, Annon only received one more call into the first team squad during the remainder of the season. He made 13 appearances during the 1994–95 season and scored three goals.

Annon was out of favour during the 1995–96 season and made just one appearance, as a substitute for Denny Mundee in a 2–0 defeat to league leaders Swindon Town on 2 September 1995. Annon departed the Bees in February 1996, after making 23 appearances and scoring four goals during his two years with the club.

=== Kingstonian ===
Annon returned to the Isthmian League Premier Division to sign for Kingstonian in March 1996. During what remained of the 1995–96 season, he made seven appearances and scored three goals.

=== Enfield ===
Annon signed for Isthmian League Premier Division club Enfield during the 1996 off-season. The 1996–97 season ended in disappointment, with the "Es" finished six points adrift of champions Yeovil Town, despite themselves finishing 28 points clear of third-place Sutton United. Annon featured in Enfield's run to the first round proper of the FA Cup during the 1998–99 season, taking Second Division club York City to a replay before being knocked out 2–1 at Bootham Crescent. The Es went one better in the 1999–00 season, defeating Second Division club Chesterfield 2–1 at Saltergate in the first round and taking Preston North End to a replay after a 0–0 draw at Deepdale in the second round. Featuring mostly as a defender, Annon made over 100 appearances for Enfield before departing at the end of the 1999–00 season.

=== Farnborough Town ===
Annon joined Isthmian League Premier Division club Farnborough Town during the 2000 off-season. He was a virtual ever-present during the 2000–01 season, making 48 appearances and winning the first silverware of his career when the club was crowned Isthmian League Premier Division champions. Promoted to the Conference, Annon was again a virtual ever-present during the 2001–02 and helped "Boro" to a 7th-place finish. Annon made 39 appearances during the 2002–03 season and the highlight came when Farnborough were drawn away to Premiership club Arsenal in the third round of the FA Cup, though "Boro" suffered a 5–1 defeat at Highbury. Annon won the Supporters' Player of the Year award and departed the club at the end of the 2002–03 season. He made 130 appearances and scored two goals during his three seasons with Farnborough.

=== Margate ===
Annon signed for Conference club Margate in June 2003. He had a successful first season, making 49 appearances, scoring two goals and winning the Kent Senior Cup. Margate suffered demotion to the newly formed Conference South for the 2004–05 season and Annon was named as captain. He filled in at centre back and wing back throughout the early part of the season and his campaign was ended prematurely after he was stretchered off with a ruptured achilles tendon after five minutes of a 1–0 defeat to Hayes on 11 December 2004. He had made 26 appearances during the 2004–05 season. The length of Annon's recovery from the injury meant that he missed the start of the 2005–06 season and he departed the club in October 2005 after returning to fitness. Annon made 75 appearances during his time with Margate and scored two goals.

=== Havant & Waterlooville ===
Annon moved back up to the Conference South to sign for Havant & Waterlooville in October 2005. He made 30 appearances during the remainder of the 2005–06 season, but his season ended in disappointment after three-point deduction saw the Hawks miss out on a playoff place. Annon was retained for the 2006–07 season, but injury problems restricted him to just 10 appearances. He made just one appearance during the 2007–08 season, before departing the club in February 2008. Annon made 41 appearances during his time with the club.

=== Redbridge ===
Annon joined Isthmian League First Division North club Redbridge on a one-month loan on 21 December 2007 and made four appearances before his loan expired. He returned to the club to sign permanently in February 2008. Annon made seven appearances during what remained of the 2007–08 season and helped the club to a 3rd-place finish and a playoff first round tie with Ware. The Motormen progressed to the playoff final, but were defeated by Canvey Island. Annon left the club after the season.

=== Tooting & Mitcham United ===
Annon signed for Isthmian League Premier Division club Tooting & Mitcham United during the 2008 off-season. An injury suffered during pre-season led to him departing the club in December 2008, without having made a competitive appearance.

=== Guildford City ===
Annon joined Combined Counties League Premier Division club Guildford City in December 2008. He made only four appearances before departing the club in February 2009.

=== Banstead Athletic ===
Annon moved across the Combined Counties League Premier Division to sign for Banstead Athletic in February 2009. He made 10 appearances during the remainder of 2008–09 and retired from football at the end of the season.

=== Norton ===
Annon came out of retirement to make 16 appearances for Surrey South Eastern Combination Junior First Division club Norton during the 2010–11 and 2011–12 seasons. He later made appearances for veterans club Livingstone RARA.

== Personal life ==
Annon works as a staff governor, teaching assistant, football coach at Macaulay CE Primary School in Clapham, London. He is also a youth coach at Clapham Rangers.

== Career statistics ==
Appearances and goals by club, season and competition
Club	Season	League			National cup (Note: Includes FA Cup)		League cup (Note: Includes EFL Cup)		Other		Total	
Club	Season	Division	Apps	Goals	Apps	Goals	Apps	Goals	Apps	Goals	Apps	Goals
Brentford	1993–94	Second Division	9	1	—		—		—		9	1
Brentford	1994–95	Second Division	10	1	1	1	0	0	2 (Note: Appearances in Football League Trophy)	1	13	3
Brentford	1995–96	Second Division	1	0	0	0	0	0	0	0	1	0
Brentford	Total		20	2	1	1	0	0	2	1	23	4
Farnborough Town	2000–01	Isthmian League Premier Division	40	1	3	0	—		5 (Note: 2 appearances in Isthmian League Cup, 1 appearance in FA Trophy, 1 appearance in Isthmian Championship Shield, 1 appearance in Hampshire Senior Cup)	0	48	1
Farnborough Town	2001–02	Conference	34	0	2	0	—		7 (Note: 4 appearances in FA Trophy, 1 appearance in Isthmian Championship Shield, 1 appearance and 1 goal in Hampshire Senior Cup)	1	43	1
Farnborough Town	2002–03	Conference	31	0	4	0	—		4 (Note: 3 appearances in FA Trophy, 1 appearance in Hampshire Senior Cup)	0	39	0
Farnborough Town	Total		105	1	9	0	—		16	1	130	2
Margate	2003–04	Conference	41	1	0	0	—		0	0	49	1
Margate	2004–05	Conference South	21	0	0	0	—		0	0	26	0
Margate	Total		62	1	0	0	—		0	0	75	1
Havant & Waterlooville	2005–06	Conference South	28	0	0	0	—		2 (Note: 1 appearance in FA Trophy, 1 appearance in Hampshire Senior Cup)	0	30	0
Havant & Waterlooville	2006–07	Conference South	8	0	0	0	—		2	0	10	0
Havant & Waterlooville	2007–08	Conference South	1	0	0	0	—		0	0	1	0
Havant & Waterlooville	Total		37	0	0	0	—		4	0	41	0
Redbridge	2007–08	Isthmian League First Division North	11	0	—		—		—		11	0
Guildford City	2008–09	Combined Counties League Premier Division	4	0	0	0	—		0	0	4	0
Banstead Athletic	2008–09	Combined Counties League Premier Division	10	0	—		—		0	0	10	0
Norton	2010–11	Surrey South Eastern Combination Junior First Division	7	0	—		—		4 (Note: 3 appearances in Surrey South Eastern Combination Junior Cup, 1 appearance in Geoff Ellis Premier Shield)	0	11	0
Norton	2011–12	Surrey South Eastern Combination Junior First Division	4	0	—		—		1 (Note: 1 appearance in Geoff Ellis Premier Shield)	0	5	0
Norton	Total		11	0	—		—		5	0	16	0
Career total			260	4	10	1	0	0	27	2	310	7

== Honours ==
Farnborough Town

- Isthmian League Premier Division: 2000–01

Margate

- Kent Senior Cup: 2003–04, 2004–05

Individual

- Farnborough Town Supporters' Player of the Year: 2002–03
