= Scott Morgan =

Scott Morgan may refer to:

- Scott Morgan (musician), American musician
- Loscil, stage name of Canadian indie musician Scott Morgan
- Scott Morgan (rugby union), former Welsh international rugby union player
- Scott Morgan (gymnast) (born 1989), Canadian artistic gymnast
- Scott Morgan (footballer), retired English footballer
