= Craig Ravenscroft =

English footballer (born 1974)

Personal information
- Full name: Craig Anthony Ravenscroft
- Date of birth: 20 December 1974 (age 51)
- Place of birth: Hammersmith, England
- Height: 5 ft 6 in (1.68 m)
- Positions: Forward; right winger

Youth career
- –1993: Brentford

Senior career*
| Years | Team | Apps | (Gls) |
| 1993–1996 | Brentford | 9 | (1) |
- → Woking (loan)
| 1996 | Kingstonian | | (1) |
| 1996–1997 | Bishop's Stortford | | |
| 1997–1998 | Hayes | | |
| 1998–1999 | Chertsey Town | | |
| 2000 | Wealdstone | | |
| 2001 | Hemel Hempstead Town | | |
| 2004 | Chertsey Town | | |
- * Club domestic league appearances and goals

Craig Anthony Ravenscoft (born 20 December 1974) is an English retired footballer. A forward, he began his career in the Football League at Brentford and upon his release in 1996, he dropped into non-League football.

== Career ==
=== Brentford ===
Ravenscroft began his career as a youth at Brentford and signed trainee forms prior to the beginning of the 1991–92 season. He signed a short-term contract after completing his traineeship at the end of the 1992–93 season. After signing a longer contract, Ravenscroft scored his first senior goal on 27 November 1993 in a 3–1 Second Division away win over Huddersfield Town and made 9 appearances during the 1993–94 season. Ravenscroft made only two appearances during the 1994–95 season, starting in a 1–0 league victory over Shrewsbury Town on 1 October 1994 and replacing Robert Taylor in a 3–1 Football League Trophy first round replay win over Gillingham on 8 November.

During the 1995–96 season, Ravenscroft was an unused substitute for league matches against Rotherham United and Bristol City in September 1995 and made what would be his final appearance for the club in a 3–0 league win over Peterborough United on 21 October. He started the match and was substituted for Carl Asaba. Ravenscroft departed the club in August 1996, having made 12 appearances and scored one goal in his Brentford career.

=== Non-League football ===
Ravenscroft joined Isthmian League Premier Division club Kingstonian in August 1996 and joined Bishop's Stortford, of the same division, in October 1996. He made a goalscoring appearance in a 2–0 win over Aylesbury United on 12 October. Ravenscroft stepped up a level to sign for Conference club Hayes on 1 August 1997. He departed the club at the end of the 1997–98 season and played the following year with Chertsey Town.

Ravenscroft joined Isthmian League First Division club Wealdstone in 2000 and Isthmian League Second Division club Hemel Hempstead Town in 2001. He played and scored in a pre-season friendly for Isthmian League Premier Division club Hendon against former club Wealdstone in July 2002. Ravenscroft's last known club was Isthmian League Second Division club Chertsey Town, whom he joined in July 2004.

== Career statistics ==
Appearances and goals by club, season and competition
| Club | Season | League | | | FA Cup | | League Cup | | Other | | Total | |
| Club | Season | Division | Apps | Goals | Apps | Goals | Apps | Goals | Apps | Goals | Apps | Goals |
|---|---|---|---|---|---|---|---|---|---|---|---|---|
| Brentford | 1993–94 | Second Division | 7 | 1 | 0 | 0 | 0 | 0 | 2 (Note: Appearances in Football League Trophy) | 0 | 9 | 1 |
| Brentford | 1994–95 | Second Division | 1 | 0 | 0 | 0 | 0 | 0 | 1 | 0 | 2 | 0 |
| Brentford | 1995–96 | Second Division | 1 | 0 | 0 | 0 | 0 | 0 | 0 | 0 | 1 | 0 |
| Career total | | | 9 | 1 | 0 | 0 | 0 | 0 | 3 | 0 | 12 | 1 |
