= Tamer Fernandes =

English professional footballer

Personal information
- Full name: Tamer Hasan Fernandes
- Date of birth: 7 December 1974 (age 51)
- Place of birth: Paddington, England
- Height: 1.91 m (6 ft 3 in)
- Position: Goalkeeper

Youth career
- Wealdstone
- –1993: Brentford

Senior career*
Years	Team	Apps	(Gls)
1993–1998	Brentford	12	(0)
1993	→ Wealdstone (loan)		
1997	→ Peterborough United (loan)	0	(0)
1998–1999	Colchester United	8	(0)
- Hemel Hempstead Town

International career
1992	England Youth	1	(0)
- * Club domestic league appearances and goals

Tamer Hasan Fernandes (born 7 December 1974) is an English former professional footballer who played as a goalkeeper in the Football League for Brentford and Colchester United.

== Club career ==
Beginning his career under the name Tamer Aouf, Fernandes began his career in the youth system at Brentford and signed his first professional contract at the end of the 1992–93 season. Over the course of the following five seasons he served as backup to Kevin Dearden and made just 17 appearances before agreeing a settlement to his contract and leaving Griffin Park in January 1998. He immediately joined Third Division high-flyers Colchester United, but failed to make an appearance during what remained of a 1997–98 season that saw the club win promotion to the Second Division via the playoffs. He made a breakthrough into the first team and made 8 appearances during the second half of the 1998–99 season, but was released in May 1999 and dropped into non-League football to join Isthmian League Second Division club Hemel Hempstead Town.

== International career ==
Fernandes was capped by England Youth.

== Personal life ==
Fernandes began his career under the name Tamer Aouf, before changing his name to Tamer Fernandes prior to the beginning of the 1993–94 season.

== Career statistics ==
Appearances and goals by club, season and competition
Club	Season	League			FA Cup		League Cup		Other		Total	
Club	Season	Division	Apps	Goals	Apps	Goals	Apps	Goals	Apps	Goals	Apps	Goals
Brentford	1992–93	First Division	0	0	0	0	0	0	0	0	0	0
Brentford	1993–94	Second Division	1	0	0	0	0	0	0	0	1	0
Brentford	1994–95	Second Division	4	0	0	0	0	0	1 (Note: Appearance in Football League Trophy)	0	5	0
Brentford	1995–96	Second Division	5	0	2	0	0	0	1	0	8	0
Brentford	1996–97	Second Division	2	0	0	0	0	0	1	0	2	0
Brentford	1997–98	Second Division	0	0	0	0	0	0	0	0	0	0
Brentford	Total		12	0	2	0	0	0	3	0	17	0
Colchester United	1998–99	Second Division	8	0	—		—		—		8	0
Career total			20	0	2	0	0	0	2	0	24	0
