= Robbie Peters =

English footballer and coach

Personal information
- Full name: Robert Anthony Angus Peters
- Date of birth: 18 May 1971 (age 55)
- Place of birth: Kensington, England
- Height: 1.73 m (5 ft 8 in)
- Position: Right winger

Youth career
- 1985–1989: Brentford

Senior career*
Years	Team	Apps	(Gls)
1989–1994	Brentford	30	(1)
1990–1991	→ St Albans City (loan)	20	(5)
1993	→ Woking (loan)	7	(0)
1994	→ Slough Town (loan)	14	(3)
1994–1995	Carlisle United	8	(0)
1995	Woking	7	(1)
1995–1996	St Albans City	18	(6)
1996–1997	Chertsey Town		
1997	Yeovil Town	2	(0)
1997–1998	Aylesbury United		
1999–2000	Chertsey Town		
2007–2008	Frankston Pines		
- * Club domestic league appearances and goals

Robert Anthony Angus Peters (born 18 May 1971) is an English retired professional footballer who played as a right winger in the Football League for Brentford and Carlisle United.

== Playing career ==
=== Brentford ===
A right winger, Peters began his career in the youth system at Third Division club Brentford, joining the club at the age of 14 and commencing a scholarship after leaving school in 1987. Playing in the same generation as Marcus Gayle, Paul Buckle and Ashley Bayes, Peters was part of the youth team which reached the semi-finals of the 1988–89 FA Youth Cup. He signed a professional contract during the 1989 off-season and made 10 appearances during the 1989–90 season, scoring one goal. Peters and youth teammate Khotso Moabi joined Isthmian League Premier Division club St Albans City on loan in November 1990. He made 24 appearances and scored seven goals before being recalled to Brentford in April 1991.

With Brentford challenging for promotion from the Third Division during the 1991–92 season, Peters managed only 14 appearances. Matters failed to improve after the Bees' promotion to the new second-tier First Division for the 1992–93 season, when he rejected the offer of a new contract during the off-season and played the entire regular season on a week-by-week basis. Peters managed just one substitute appearance during the 1992–93 season and ended the campaign on loan at Conference club Woking, for whom he made seven appearances.

After Brentford's relegation straight back to the third-tier, Peters signed a new two-year contract and made 17 appearances and scored one goal during the first half of the 1993–94 season, before spending the second half of the campaign on loan at Conference club Slough Town. He failed to make an appearance during the opening month of the 1994–95 season and had his contract cancelled in September 1994. During five years as a professional at Griffin Park, Peters made 42 appearances and scored two goals.

=== Later career ===
Peters joined Third Division club Carlisle United in November 1994, but managed just eight league appearances during the 1994–95 season before being released in 1995. Peters then dropped into non-League football and after returns to Woking and St Albans City, he went on to play for Chertsey Town, Yeovil Town and Aylesbury United. He moved to Australia in the early 2000s and won the Victorian State League Division 1 title with Frankston Pines in 2007.

== Coaching career ==
Peters worked as a strength and conditioning coach with the Football Star Academy in Melbourne, Australia.

== Personal life ==
Peters is married with four children. As of March 2020, he was running a personal training business in Melbourne, Australia.

== Career statistics ==
Appearances and goals by club, season and competition
Club	Season	League			FA Cup		League Cup		Other		Total	
Club	Season	Division	Apps	Goals	Apps	Goals	Apps	Goals	Apps	Goals	Apps	Goals
Brentford	1989–90	Third Division	2	0	1	0	0	0	0	0	3	0
Brentford	1990–91	Third Division	6	1	—		0	0	1 (Note: Appearance in Third Division play-offs)	0	7	1
Brentford	1991–92	Third Division	9	0	0	0	3	0	2 (Note: Appearances in Football League Trophy)	0	14	0
Brentford	1992–93	First Division	1	0	0	0	0	0	0	0	1	0
Brentford	1993–94	Second Division	12	0	0	0	2	1	3	0	17	1
Brentford	Total		30	1	1	0	5	1	6	0	42	2
St Albans City (loan)	1990–91	Isthmian League Premier Division	20	5	—		—		4 (Note: 2 appearances and 2 goals in Herts Senior Cup, 1 appearance in Isthmian League Full Members Cup, 1 appearance in Billy Minter Trophy)	2	24	7
Slough Town (loan)	1993–94	Conference	14	3	—		—		1 (Note: Appearance in FA Trophy)	0	15	3
St Albans City	1995–96	Isthmian League Premier Division	18	6	—		—		9 (Note: 3 appearances in East Anglian Cup, 2 appearances in FA Trophy, 1 appearance in Isthmian League Full Members Cup, 1 appearance in Herts Senior Cup, 1 appearance in Herts Charity Cup, 1 appearance in Eastern Floodlight Cup)	0	27	6
St Albans City	Total		38	11	—		—		13	2	51	13
Yeovil Town	1996–97	Isthmian League Premier Division	2	0	—		—		—		2	0
Aylesbury United	1997–98	Isthmian League Premier Division	8	0	—		—		2 (Note: 1 appearance in FA Trophy, 1 appearance in Isthmian League Full Members Cup)	0	10	0
Career total			92	15	1	0	5	1	22	2	120	18

== Honours ==
Frankston Pines

- Victorian State League Division 1: 2007
