= John Cornwell (footballer) =

English footballer

Personal information
- Full name: John Anthony Cornwell
- Date of birth: 13 October 1964 (age 62)
- Place of birth: Bethnal Green, England
- Height: 6 ft 0 in (1.83 m)
- Positions: Midfielder; defender

Youth career
- 1979–: West Ham United
- –1982: Leyton Orient

Senior career*
Years	Team	Apps	(Gls)
1982–1987	Leyton Orient	203	(35)
1987–1988	Newcastle United	33	(1)
1988–1990	Swindon Town	25	(0)
1990–1993	Southend United	101	(5)
1993	→ Cardiff City (loan)	5	(2)
1993	→ Brentford (loan)	4	(0)
1994	→ Northampton Town (loan)	13	(1)
Total		384	(44)
- * Club domestic league appearances and goals

John Anthony Cornwell (born 13 October 1964) is an English former professional footballer who played in the Football League as a midfielder and defender, most notably for Leyton Orient and Southend United.

== Career statistics ==
Appearances and goals by club, season and competition
Club	Season	League			FA Cup		League Cup		Other		Total	
Club	Season	Division	Apps	Goals	Apps	Goals	Apps	Goals	Apps	Goals	Apps	Goals
Newcastle United	1987–88	First Division	24	1	1	0	2	0	2 (Note: Appearances in Full Members' Cup)	0	29	1
Newcastle United	1988–89	First Division	9	0	0	0	1	0	3 (Note: 2 appearances in Football League Centenary Trophy, 1 appearance in Full Members' Cup)	0	13	0
Newcastle United	Total		33	1	1	0	3	0	5	0	42	1
Swindon Town	1988–89	Second Division	6	0	4	0	—		—		10	0
Swindon Town	1989–90	Second Division	19	0	0	0	5	0	1	0	25	0
Swindon Town	Total		25	0	4	0	5	0	1	0	35	0
Southend United	Total		101	5	5	0	6	0	5	0	117	5
Brentford (loan)	1993–94	Second Division	4	0	—		—		—		4	0
Northampton Town (loan)	1993–94	Third Division	13	1	—		—		—		13	1
Career total			176	7	10	0	14	0	11	0	208	7
