= Lee Harvey (footballer) =

English footballer (born 1966)

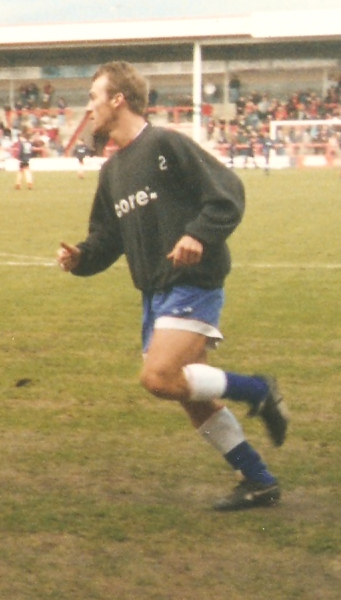
- Harvey warming up at the Bescot Stadium in 1996

Personal information
- Full name: Lee Derek Harvey
- Date of birth: 21 December 1966 (age 59)
- Place of birth: Harlow, England
- Height: 1.80 m (5 ft 11 in)
- Positions: Defender; midfielder

Youth career
- Peterswood
- 1982–1983: Leyton Orient

Senior career*
| Years | Team | Apps | (Gls) |
| 1983–1993 | Leyton Orient | 184 | (23) |
| 1993 | Nottingham Forest | 2 | (0) |
| 1993–1998 | Brentford | 105 | (6) |
| 1998–2000 | Stevenage Borough | 75 | (0) |
| 2000–2001 | St Albans City | 11 | (0) |
| 2001–2003 | Bedford Town | 49 | (0) |
| Total | | 426 | (29) |

International career
- England Youth
- * Club domestic league appearances and goals

Lee Derek Harvey (born 21 December 1966) is an English former professional footballer who played as a defender and midfielder. He is best remembered for his long spells in the Football League with Leyton Orient and Brentford.

== Playing career ==
=== Leyton Orient ===
Growing up in Harlow, Harvey began his career with youth club Peterswood and turned down the chance to join Tottenham Hotspur to move into the youth system at Third Division club Leyton Orient (then named 'Orient'). He made his debut during the 1983–84 season and finished the campaign with four league appearances. Another eight appearances and one goal followed in 1984–95, a season in which Orient suffered relegation to the Fourth Division. Following two further seasons in a bit-part role, Harvey achieved something of a first team breakthrough in 1987–88, with 27 appearances and one goal, albeit with the majority of his league appearances coming as a substitute.

Following a sixth-place finish in the Fourth Division in 1988–89, Orient saw off Scarborough in the play-off semi-finals to secure a place in the final against Wrexham. After a 0–0 draw in the first leg, Harvey scored the opening goal in the second leg to send Orient to a 2–1 aggregate win and seal promotion back to the Third Division. Back in the Third Division, Harvey made 42 appearances and scored seven goals during the 1989–90 season. Harvey's appearances slowly tapered off during the early 1990s and he was released by the club in August 1993, after making made 237 appearances and scoring 29 goals in all competitions during 10 seasons at Brisbane Road.

=== Nottingham Forest ===
Harvey reunited with his former Leyton Orient manager Frank Clark to join First Division club Nottingham Forest on a three-month trial on 4 August 1993. He managed only three substitute appearances in all competitions during his time at the City Ground, before departing in November 1993.

=== Brentford ===
Harvey joined Second Division club Brentford on a one-month contract on 18 November 1993. During what remained of the 1993–94 season, he made 29 appearances, scored four goals and signed a new 18-month contract. Harvey scored his first goal of the 1994–95 season in a famous 7–0 win over Plymouth Argyle at Griffin Park on 17 December 1994, which was Brentford's biggest win of the season. He scored his second goal of the season in a 3–2 league win over Cardiff City on 2 January 1995. Harvey suffered playoff heartbreak at the end of the season, as the restructuring of the Premier League and the Football League consigned Brentford to the Second Division playoffs, despite a second-place finish in the league. The Bees went out on penalties in the semi-finals to the eventual promoted team, Huddersfield Town. Harvey made 33 appearances during the 1994–95 season and scored two goals.

Harvey scored his only goal of the 1995–96 season with a header in a 2–2 League Cup first round first leg draw with Walsall on 15 August 1996. Despite Brentford's poor form in the league, Harvey was ever-present in Brentford's run to the FA Cup fourth round, beating non-League Farnborough Town, Second Division AFC Bournemouth, First Division Norwich City at Carrow Road, before narrowly losing 3–2 to First Division club Charlton Athletic at The Valley in the fourth round. Harvey made 49 appearances during the 1995–96 season and scored one goal.

Harvey found himself relegated to a substitute role during the 1996–97 season and he made 19 appearances before suffering a cruciate ligament injury in December 1996. In his absence, Brentford suffered heartbreak in the 1997 Second Division play-off final, which was lost 1–0 to Crewe Alexandra. Harvey was not called into the first team squad at all during the 1997–98 season and was released in February 1998. Harvey made 130 appearances for the Bees in all competitions and scored seven goals. In May 1998, Harvey received a testimonial at Griffin Park, played between Brentford and a Lee Harvey Select XI.

=== Stevenage Borough ===
Harvey transferred to Conference club Stevenage Borough on 28 February 1998 and made 12 appearances in what remained of the 1997–98 season. Harvey had a successful 1998–99 season, making 46 appearances and winning the club's Player Of The Season award, helping the club to a sixth-place finish and to the second round of the FA Cup. Harvey departed Broadhall Way at the end of the 1999–00 season, having made 95 appearances during two and a half seasons with the club.

=== St Albans City ===
Harvey joined Isthmian League Premier Division club St Albans City during the 2000 off-season. He managed only 17 appearances during the 2000–01 season, the last of which coming in a 3–1 win over Maidenhead United on 9 December 2000.

=== Bedford Town ===
Harvey transferred to Isthmian League Premier Division club Bedford Town on 1 August 2001. He played a part in Bedford's run to the first round proper of the FA Cup, where the Eagles took Second Division club Peterborough United to a replay. Harvey made 32 league appearances during the 2001–02 season won the Players' Player Of The Year award. He played on into the 2002–03 season, making 17 appearances.

== International career ==
Harvey was capped by England Youth at international level.

== Personal life ==
As of 1999, Harvey was working for a plant hire company in Cambridgeshire.

== Career statistics ==
Appearances and goals by club, season and competition
| Club | Season | League | | | FA Cup | | League Cup | | Other | | Total | |
| Club | Season | Division | Apps | Goals | Apps | Goals | Apps | Goals | Apps | Goals | Apps | Goals |
|---|---|---|---|---|---|---|---|---|---|---|---|---|
| Leyton Orient | 1983–84 | Third Division | 4 | 0 | 0 | 0 | 0 | 0 | 0 | 0 | 4 | 0 |
| Leyton Orient | 1984–85 | Third Division | 4 | 0 | 0 | 0 | 0 | 0 | 0 | 0 | 8 | 1 |
| Leyton Orient | 1985–86 | Fourth Division | 12 | 2 | 0 | 0 | 0 | 0 | 0 | 0 | 15 | 2 |
| Leyton Orient | 1986–87 | Fourth Division | 14 | 1 | 0 | 0 | 0 | 0 | 0 | 0 | 21 | 3 |
| Leyton Orient | 1987–88 | Fourth Division | 23 | 1 | 0 | 0 | 0 | 0 | 0 | 0 | 27 | 1 |
| Leyton Orient | 1988–89 | Fourth Division | 29 | 6 | 0 | 0 | 0 | 0 | 0 | 0 | 42 | 7 |
| Leyton Orient | 1989–90 | Third Division | 37 | 6 | 0 | 0 | 0 | 0 | 0 | 0 | 43 | 7 |
| Leyton Orient | 1990–91 | Third Division | 25 | 3 | 0 | 0 | 0 | 0 | 0 | 0 | 34 | 4 |
| Leyton Orient | 1991–92 | Third Division | 13 | 0 | 0 | 0 | 0 | 0 | 0 | 0 | 18 | 1 |
| Leyton Orient | 1992–93 | Second Division | 22 | 4 | 0 | 0 | 0 | 0 | 0 | 0 | 23 | 5 |
| Leyton Orient | Total | | 184 | 12 | 0 | 0 | 0 | 0 | 0 | 0 | 237 | 29 |
| Nottingham Forest | 1993–94 | First Division | 2 | 0 | — | | 1 | 0 | — | | 3 | 0 |
| Brentford | 1993–94 | Second Division | 26 | 4 | 1 | 0 | — | | 2 (Note: Appearances in Football League Trophy) | 0 | 29 | 4 |
| Brentford | 1994–95 | Second Division | 25 | 2 | 2 | 0 | 4 | 0 | 2 | 0 | 33 | 2 |
| Brentford | 1995–96 | Second Division | 40 | 0 | 5 | 0 | 3 | 1 | 1 | 0 | 49 | 1 |
| Brentford | 1996–97 | Second Division | 14 | 0 | 2 | 0 | 2 | 0 | 1 | 0 | 19 | 0 |
| Brentford | Total | | 105 | 6 | 10 | 0 | 9 | 1 | 6 | 0 | 130 | 7 |
| Stevenage Borough | 1997–98 | Conference | 10 | 0 | — | | — | | 2 (Note: Appearances in FA Trophy) | 0 | 12 | 0 |
| Stevenage Borough | 1998–99 | Conference | 35 | 0 | 5 | 0 | — | | 6 (Note: 4 appearances in FA Trophy, 2 appearances in Conference League Cup) | 0 | 46 | 0 |
| Stevenage Borough | 1999–00 | Conference | 33 | 0 | 2 | 0 | — | | 2 | 0 | 37 | 0 |
| Stevenage Borough | Total | | 78 | 0 | 7 | 0 | — | | 10 | 0 | 95 | 0 |
| St Albans City | 2000–01 | Isthmian League Premier Division | 11 | 0 | 0 | 0 | — | | 6 (Note: 2 appearances in FA Trophy, 2 appearances in Isthmian League Cup, 1 appearance in Isthmian League Full Members Cup, 1 appearance in Herts Senior Cup) | 0 | 17 | 0 |
| Bedford Town | 2001–02 | Isthmian League Premier Division | 31 | 0 | 0 | 0 | — | | 0 | 0 | 31 | 0 |
| Bedford Town | 2002–03 | Isthmian League Premier Division | 17 | 0 | 0 | 0 | — | | 0 | 0 | 17 | 0 |
| Bedford Town | Total | | 48 | 0 | 0 | 0 | — | | 0 | 0 | 48 | 0 |
| Career total | | | 428 | 18 | 17 | 0 | 10 | 1 | 22 | 0 | 530 | 36 |

== Honours ==
Leyton Orient

- Football League Fourth Division play-offs: 1989

Individual

- Stevenage Borough Player of the Year: 1998–99
- Bedford Town Players' Player of the Year: 2001–02
