= Matthew Metcalf =

English footballer

Personal information
- Full name: Matthew Adam Metcalf
- Date of birth: 28 July 1969 (age 57)
- Place of birth: Norwich, England
- Position: Forward

Senior career*
Years	Team	Apps	(Gls)
- Wymondham Town
	Wroxham		(50+)
- Diss Town
- Braintree Town
1993–1994	Brentford	7	(0)
- Wroxham
- * Club domestic league appearances and goals

Matthew Adam Metcalf (born 28 July 1969) is an English retired professional football forward who played in the Football League for Brentford.

== Career ==
Metcalf scored over 100 goals in non-league football for local Norfolk clubs Wymondham Town, Diss Town and Wroxham before joining Southern League South Division club Braintree Town. There he was spotted by Bobby Tambling and recommended to David Webb, manager of newly relegated Second Division club Brentford, early in the 1993–94 season. Metcalf signed a two-year contract with the Bees for a £10,000 fee in September 1993, but made just 9 appearances before his contract was terminated at the end of the season. He scored 13 goals in 22 reserve appearances for Brentford.

He became the top goalscorer for Wroxham and scored 50 goals for the club during the 1992–93 season.

== Career statistics ==
Appearances and goals by club, season and competition
Club	Season	League			FA Cup		League Cup		Other		Total	
Club	Season	Division	Apps	Goals	Apps	Goals	Apps	Goals	Apps	Goals	Apps	Goals
Wroxham	1992–93											50
Brentford	1993–94	Second Division	7	0	0	0	—		2 (Note: Appearances in Football League Trophy.)	0	9	0
Career total			7	0	0	0	—		2	0	9	0
