= Dean Williams (footballer, born 1970) =

English footballer

Personal information
- Full name: Dean Anton Williams
- Date of birth: 14 November 1970 (age 55)
- Place of birth: Hemel Hempstead, England
- Position: Forward

Youth career
- Luton Town
- –1987: Cambridge United

Senior career*
Years	Team	Apps	(Gls)
1987–1989	Cambridge United	1	(0)
1989	St Albans City	8	(2)
1989–1990	Hemel Hempstead	33	(11)
1990–1992	Wokingham Town	55	(27)
1992–1993	St Albans City	36	(18)
1993–1994	Brentford	3	(1)
1994	Stevenage Borough	5	(3)
1994	Doncaster Rovers	1	(0)
1994–1995	Aylesbury United	27	(21)
1995	Berkhamsted Town	49	(28)
1995–1996	Hayes	8	(5)
1996	→ Chesham United (loan)		
1996	→ Hitchin Town (loan)	3	(1)
1997–1998	Aylesbury United	11	(3)

Managerial career
- Berkhamsted Town (player-manager)
- * Club domestic league appearances and goals

Dean Anton Williams (born 14 November 1970) is an English retired professional footballer who played as a forward in the Football League for Brentford, Cambridge United and Doncaster Rovers. Williams found his level in non-League football and scored over 145 goals in over 285 games, most notably for St Albans City, Wokingham Town, Aylesbury United and Berkhamsted Town, whom he player-managed.

== Honours ==
St Albans City

- East Anglian Cup: 1992–93

Aylesbury United

- Isthmian League Cup: 1994–95

== Career statistics ==
Appearances and goals by club, season and competition
Club	Season	League			FA Cup		League Cup		Other		Total	
Club	Season	Division	Apps	Goals	Apps	Goals	Apps	Goals	Apps	Goals	Apps	Goals
Cambridge United	1987–88	Fourth Division	1	0	0	0	1	0	0	0	2	0
St Albans City	1989–90	Isthmian League Premier Division	8	2	1	0	—		2 (Note: 1 appearance in FA Trophy, 1 appearance in Isthmian League Cup)	0	11	2
St Albans City	1992–93	Isthmian League Premier Division	36	18	6	4	—		20 (Note: 5 appearances and 1 goal in East Anglian Cup, 4 appearances and 1 goal in FA Trophy, 3 appearances and 5 goals in Herts Senior Cup, 3 appearances and 1 goal in Eastern Floodlight Cup, 2 appearances in Herts Charity Cup, 1 appearance in Isthmian League Cup, 1 appearance in Isthmian League Full Members Cup, 1 appearance in Southern Combination Cup)	8	62	30
St Albans City	Total		56	20	7	4	—		22	8	85	32
Brentford	1993–94	Second Division	3	1	0	0	0	0	0	0	3	1
Stevenage Borough	1994–95	Conference	5	3	1	0	—		2 (Note: 1 appearance in Isthmian League Charity Shield, 1 appearance in Herts Senior Cup)	0	8	3
Doncaster Rovers	1994–95	Third Division	1	0	—		—		—		1	0
Hitchin Town (loan)	1995–96	Isthmian League Premier Division	3	1	—		—		—		3	1
Aylesbury United	1995–96	Isthmian League Premier Division	7	1	1	0	—		2 (Note: 1 appearance and 1 goal in Isthmian League Full Members Cup, 1 appearance in FA Trophy)	1	10	2
Career total			64	25	9	4	1	0	26	9	100	39
