= Brian Statham (footballer) =

English footballer (born 1969)

Personal information
- Date of birth: 21 May 1969 (age 57)
- Place of birth: Harare, Rhodesia
- Height: 1.73 m (5 ft 8 in)
- Positions: Right back; midfielder

Team information
- Current team: Welling United (director of football)

Youth career
- –1987: Tottenham Hotspur

Senior career*
Years	Team	Apps	(Gls)
1987–1992	Tottenham Hotspur	24	(0)
1991	→ Reading	8	(0)
1991	→ Bournemouth (loan)	2	(0)
1992	→ Brentford (loan)	1	(0)
1992–1997	Brentford	161	(1)
1997–1999	Gillingham	20	(0)
1998	→ Woking (loan)		
1999	→ Stevenage Borough (loan)	3	(0)
2000–2001	Chesham United		
2001–2003	Chelmsford City	66	(0)
2003–2004	Welling United	25	(0)
2004	East Thurrock United		
2004–2005	Erith & Belvedere		
2005	Heybridge Swifts	1	(0)

International career
1988	England U21	3	(0)

Managerial career
- 2005–2008: Heybridge Swifts
- 2009–2010: Billericay Town
- 2025: Welling United (caretaker)
- * Club domestic league appearances and goals

Brian Statham (born 21 May 1969) is an English retired professional footballer who made over 160 appearances in the Football League for Brentford as a right back. He also played League football for Tottenham Hotspur, Gillingham, Reading, Bournemouth and was capped by England at U21 level. Statham later managed Heybridge Swifts, Billericay Town and Welling United in non-League football.

== Club career ==
=== Tottenham Hotspur ===
A right back, Statham began his career in the youth system at First Division club Tottenham Hotspur and turned professional in 1987. He broke through into the first team during the 1987–88 season and made 19 appearances. Statham managed eight further appearances during the 1988–89 season, before dropping out of the squad. He spent time away on loan during the 1990–91 and 1991–92 seasons and departed White Hart Lane in February 1992. Statham was awarded a benefit match by the club in July 2000.

=== Brentford ===
==== 1992–1993 ====
In January 1992, Statham joined high-flying Third Division club Brentford on a one-month loan, with a view to a permanent transfer. He made just one appearance during his spell and rejected the contract offered, before reconsidering and joining the club on a permanent transfer for a £70,000 fee on 28 February. Statham was a regular in the team during the last three months of the 1991–92 season, making 18 appearances and he won the first silverware of his career when Brentford secured the Third Division championship on the final day. Statham's 58 appearances during the 1992–93 season in the reclassified First Division was a career-high, but the season ended on a disappointing note, with relegation straight back to the third-tier.

==== 1993–94 season ====
Back in the Second Division for the 1993–94 season, Statham made 36 appearances and scored what would be the only goal of his professional career in a 3–3 draw with Cambridge United on 26 March 1993. Despite appearing regularly during the first half of the 1994–95 season, he was transfer listed in December 1994. Statham made 44 appearances during a season in which the Bees were denied promotion after defeat to Huddersfield Town in the playoff semi-finals.

==== 1995–96 season ====
During the 1995 off-season, Statham rejected a new contract in favour of a week-to-week deal. He made 24 appearances before suffering a double fracture of his right leg during a 1–0 FA Cup second round victory over Bournemouth on 2 December 1995. Though he was still on the weekly contract, the club honoured the terms of its initial contract offer until the end of the 1995–96 season.

==== 1996–97 season ====
Statham returned to training November 1996 and made his first appearance in nearly 13 months as a 79th-minute substitute for Carl Asaba in a 4–1 victory over Plymouth Argyle on 26 December 1996. Featuring mostly as a substitute, Statham finished with the 1996–97 season with 25 appearances. His Brentford career ended in ignominy, after he was sent off for receiving a second yellow card late in the 1997 Second Division playoff Final, which was lost 1–0 to Crewe Alexandra. Statham departed Brentford in August 1997, having made 201 appearances and scored one goal during 5 1/2 years at Griffin Park.

=== Gillingham ===
On 22 August 1997, Statham joined Second Division club Gillingham for a £10,000 fee, with two further £10,000 fees to be paid based on appearances. He made just 24 appearances before departing Priestfield in October 1999.

=== Non-League football ===
After loan spells with non-League clubs Woking and Stevenage Borough while a Gillingham player, Statham dropped back into non-League football upon his release from Gillingham in October 1999. Between 2000 and 2005 he played for Chesham United, Chelmsford City, Welling United, East Thurrock United, Erith & Belvedere and Heybridge Swifts.

== International career ==
Statham won three caps for the England U21 team in 1988.

== Managerial career ==
=== Heybridge Swifts ===
Statham was appointed as manager of Isthmian League Premier Division club Heybridge Swifts in January 2005. He guided the club to a runners-up finish in the 2005–06 season, but the Swifts were denied promotion after falling to Hampton & Richmond Borough in the playoff semi-finals. After two mid-table finishes, Statham resigned on 28 August 2008.

=== Billericay Town ===
On 23 April 2009, Statham was announced as manager of Isthmian League Premier Division club Billericay Town. With relegation at the end of the 2009–10 season looking a possibility, Statham was sacked on 29 March 2010.

=== Welling United ===
After having served as first team coach at National League South club Welling United in recent weeks, Statham was appointed caretaker manager after manager Rod Stringer stepped down from his role on 16 March 2025. He won just one of eight league matches during the remainder of a 2024–25 season, which culminated in relegation. Some cheer was found with a 1–0 victory over Ebbsfleet United in the 2025 Kent Senior Cup Final.

== Personal life ==
Statham was born in Harare, Rhodesia (now Zimbabwe) and later lived in Saudi Arabia, before his parents moved to Essex. The namesake of a former England international cricketer, he represented Essex in school cricket. Statham's son Maxwell is also a footballer and plays in non-League football, including briefly under his father's management at Welling United. After retiring from football, Statham became a businessman, with interests in media, insurance and investments.

== Career statistics ==
Appearances and goals by club, season and competition
Club	Season	League			FA Cup		League Cup		Other		Total	
Club	Season	Division	Apps	Goals	Apps	Goals	Apps	Goals	Apps	Goals	Apps	Goals
Tottenham Hotspur	1987–88	First Division	18	0	1	0	0	0	—		19	0
Tottenham Hotspur	1988–89	First Division	6	0	0	0	2	0	—		8	0
Tottenham Hotspur	Total		24	0	1	0	2	0	—		27	0
Reading (loan)	1990–91	Third Division	8	0	—		—		—		8	0
Bournemouth (loan)	1991–92	Third Division	2	0	0	0	—		1 (Note: Appearances in Football League Trophy)	0	3	0
Brentford	1991–92	Third Division	18	0	—		—		—		18	0
Brentford	1992–93	First Division	45	0	1	0	4	0	8 (Note: Appearances in Anglo-Italian Cup)	0	58	0
Brentford	1993–94	Second Division	31	1	1	0	2	0	2	0	36	1
Brentford	1994–95	Second Division	36	0	2	0	2	0	4 (Note: 2 appearances in Second Division play-offs, 2 appearances in Football League Trophy)	0	44	0
Brentford	1995–96	Second Division	17	0	1	0	4	0	2	0	24	0
Brentford	1996–97	Second Division	19	0	1	0	0	0	5 (Note: 3 appearances in Second Division play-offs, 2 appearances in Football League Trophy)	0	25	0
Brentford	Total		166	1	6	0	8	0	21	0	201	1
Gillingham	1997–98	Second Division	20	0	2	0	0	0	1	0	23	0
Gillingham	1998–99	Second Division	0	0	—		0	0	1	0	1	0
Gillingham	Total		20	0	2	0	0	0	2	0	24	0
Stevenage Borough (loan)	1998–99	Conference	3	0	—		—		—		3	0
Chesham United	2001–02	Isthmian League Premier Division	8	1	0	0	—		0	0	8	1
Chelmsford City	2001–02	Southern League Premier Division	27	0	—		—		0	0	27	0
Chelmsford City	2002–03	Southern League Premier Division	39	0	0	0	—		0	0	39	0
Chelmsford City	Total		66	0	0	0	—		0	0	66	0
Welling United	2003–04	Southern League Premier Division	25	0	0	0	—		0	0	25	0
Erith & Belvedere	2004–05	Southern League First Division East	1	0	0	0	—		0	0	1	0
Heybridge Swifts	2004–05	Isthmian League Premier Division	1	0	—		—		—		1	0
Career total			324	2	9	0	10	0	24	0	367	2

== Honours ==
=== Player ===
Brentford

- Football League Third Division: 1991–92

=== Manager ===
Welling United

- Kent Senior Cup: 2024–25
