= Scott Morgan (footballer) =

English footballer

Personal information
- Full name: Scott Morgan
- Date of birth: 22 March 1975 (age 51)
- Place of birth: Colchester, England
- Positions: Left back; centre back

Youth career
- Weymouth Wizards
- West Ham United
- 1992–1993: Bournemouth

Senior career*
Years	Team	Apps	(Gls)
1993–1994	Brentford	1	(0)
1994–1997	Dorchester Town	56	(0)
1999–2001	Galway United	49	(1)
2001–2003	Barry Town	61	(3)
2003	Forest Green Rovers	7	(0)
2003–2005	Newport County	54	(3)
2005–2007	Dorchester Town	62	(2)
- * Club domestic league appearances and goals

Scott Morgan (born 22 March 1975) is an English retired professional footballer who played as a defender. He made one appearance in the Football League for Brentford and had a long career in semi-professional football in England, Ireland and Wales.

== Club career ==
=== Brentford ===
After beginning his career in the youth systems at West Ham United and Bournemouth, Morgan joined Second Division club Brentford in 1993. He made his professional debut in a 1–0 victory over Hartlepool United on 9 October 1993. Having made just three appearances, Morgan was released at the end of the 1993–94 season and his progress was hampered by a serious knee injury.

=== Dorchester Town ===
After his release from Brentford, Morgan signed for Southern League Premier Division club Dorchester Town, who were managed by his father Stuart. He remained with the club until 1997 and disillusioned, quit football. Looking back in 2005, Morgan stated that he "hated" his time with the club and found it difficult being the manager's son.

=== Galway United ===
Morgan returned to football in 1999, after receiving a phone call from former Dorchester Town teammate and Galway United manager Don O'Riordan. Morgan subsequently signed for the League of Ireland Premier Division strugglers and helped the club to stave off relegation during the 1999–00 season. He was also named captain. Morgan made 25 appearances and scored one goal during the 2000–01 season, but could not help the Tribesmen narrowly avoiding relegation for the second season in succession. He departed the club after the campaign, having made 49 appearances and scored one goal.

=== Barry Town ===
Morgan joined reigning League of Wales champions Barry Town in July 2001. He made 40 appearances during the 2001–02 season and won the first silverware of his career, with a League of Wales and Welsh Cup double. He signed a new two-year contract in May 2002. Morgan made 27 league appearances and scored three goals during the 2002–03 season, once again winning the newly branded-Welsh Premier League and Welsh Cup double. With years of overspending crippling the club, Morgan and most of the squad departed Barry in August 2003. Morgan made 61 league appearances and scored three goals during his two years with the club.

=== Forest Green Rovers ===
After interest from Southern League Premier Division club Newport County, Morgan signed for Conference club Forest Green Rovers on a two-year deal in August 2003. Morgan played in the Green's first seven games of the season, before a head-butting incident with stand-in captain Martin Foster in a 2–1 defeat to Halifax Town in late September saw him sacked by the club.

=== Newport County ===
Morgan joined Southern League Premier Division club Newport County on a temporary contract on 21 October 2003. He made 14 appearances and scored two goals during the 2003–04 season. Morgan made 40 appearances and scored one goal for the struggling team and departed the club at the end of the campaign, having been looking for a move away from Spytty Park since January 2005.

=== Return to Dorchester Town ===
Morgan returned to Dorchester Town in May 2005 and signed a two-year contract. Now playing Conference South football with the Magpies, Morgan made 32 appearances and scored one goal during the 2005–06 season. His performances saw him jointly-awarded the club's Player of the Year award with centre back partner Alex Browne. Morgan made 30 league appearances and scored one goal during the 2006–07 season. He agreed a new one-year deal in May 2007, but quit the club two months later, citing difficulties with the club's new full-time training regime.

== Personal life ==
Morgan is a member of the Morgan footballing family, which includes Stuart Morgan (his father), Ceri Morgan and Eli Morgan.

== Career statistics ==
Appearances and goals by club, season and competition
Club	Season	League			National Cup		League Cup		Europe		Other		Total	
Club	Season	Division	Apps	Goals	Apps	Goals	Apps	Goals	Apps	Goals	Apps	Goals	Apps	Goals
Brentford	1993–94	Second Division	1	0	0	0	0	0	—		2 (Note: Appearances in Football League Trophy)	0	3	0
Galway United	2000–01	League of Ireland Premier Division	25	0	1	0	2	0	—		—		28	0
Barry Town	2001–02	Welsh Premier League	34	0	0	0	0	0	2 (Note: Appearances in UEFA Champions League)	0	0	0	36	0
Barry Town	2002–03	Welsh Premier League	27	3	0	0	0	0	1	0	0	0	29	3
Barry Town	2003–04	Welsh Premier League	0	0	—		—		2	0	—		2	0
Barry Town	Total		61	3	0	0	0	0	5	0	0	0	66	3
Forest Green Rovers	2003–04	Conference	7	0	—		—		—		—		7	0
Newport County	2003–04	Southern League Premier Division	14	2	0	0	—		—		0	0	14	2
Newport County	2004–05	Conference South	40	1	0	0	—		—		0	0	40	1
Newport County	Total		54	3	0	0	—		—		0	0	54	3
Dorchester Town	2005–06	Conference South	32	1	0	0	—		—		0	0	32	1
Dorchester Town	2006–07	Conference South	30	1	0	0	—		—		0	0	30	1
Dorchester Town	Total		62	2	0	0	—		—		0	0	62	2
Career total			210	8	1	0	2	0	5	0	2	0	220	8

== Honours ==
Barry Town

- Welsh Premier League (2): 2001–02, 2002–03
- Welsh Cup (2): 2001–02, 2002–03

Individual

- Dorchester Town Player of the Year (1): 2005–06
