= Paul Smith (footballer, born 1971) =

English footballer

Personal information
- Full name: Paul William Smith
- Date of birth: 18 September 1971 (age 55)
- Place of birth: East Ham, London, England
- Position: Midfielder

Senior career*
Years	Team	Apps	(Gls)
1990–1993	Southend United	20	(1)
1993	→ Dover Athletic (loan)	?	(?)
1993–1997	Brentford	159	(11)
1997–2005	Gillingham	342	(21)
2005–2006	Walsall	8	(1)
2005	→ Gillingham (loan)	3	(0)
2006	Swindon Town	9	(0)
2006–2007	AFC Sudbury	1	(1)
2007	Torquay United	8	(0)
2007	Barnet	0	(0)
2007	Great Wakering Rovers	1	(0)
2007	St Albans City	4	(0)
2007–2008	AFC Sudbury	14	(2)
2008	Margate		
2008–????	Billericay Town		
- * Club domestic league appearances and goals as of 26 January 2008 (UTC)

Paul William Smith (born 18 September 1971) is an English former professional footballer.

Smith was born in East Ham, London and began his career as a trainee with Southend United, turning professional in 1990. He found his chances limited at Roots Hall and after a loan spell with Dover Athletic moved on to Brentford in August 1993 on a free transfer.

In August 1997, he joined Gillingham, where he enjoyed the most successful spell of his career. He captained the Kent side for a lengthy spell and was also named the club's player of the year on an unprecedented four occasions, although his final reign ended in a bizarre dispute with chairman Paul Scally in which Smith reportedly refused to hand back the trophy until he was paid money he claimed the club owed him.

While with Gillingham Smith played in both the 1999 and 2000 Football League Second Division play-off finals at Wembley, losing to Manchester City in 1999 on penalties, but achieving promotion to the second-tier for the first time in the Kent side's history in 2000 after defeating Wigan Athletic 3–2 (after extra time).

He left Priestfield in 2005, after the team were relegated to Football League One and he was offered reduced terms.

In July 2005, he joined Walsall, returning to Gillingham in October 2005 to play three times in a loan spell. He moved to Swindon Town in January 2006, but was released in June 2006 after Swindon sacked manager Iffy Onuora.

He joined A.F.C. Sudbury in October 2006, but returned to league football when he joined Torquay United on 29 January 2007. He played eight times for Torquay as they were relegated to the Conference National. On the eve of the transfer window in August 2007, he joined Barnet, but just one day later Bees manager Paul Fairclough decided he didn't want the player and released him. Smith made one appearance for Great Wakering Rovers at the start of the 2007–08 season before moving to St Albans City for whom he made four starts before returning to A.F.C. Sudbury on 18 October 2007.

In May 2008, he joined Margate as a player/coach, forming part of a new management team headed by first team manager Barry Ashby, but the pair were sacked in October of the same year. Smith next signed for Billericay Town, and on his debut scored the winning goal against Margate.

== Honours ==
Gillingham

- Football League Second Division play-offs: 2000

Individual

- Gillingham Player of the Season: 1997–98, 2000–01, 2001–02, 2004–05

== Sources ==
- Triggs, Roger (2001). The Men Who Made Gillingham Football Club. Tempus Publishing Ltd. ISBN 0-7524-2243-X.
- Paul Smith's at Soccerbase
- Playfair Football Annuals 1990-91 to 2007-08
