= Dean Williams (footballer, born 1972) =

English footballer

Personal information
- Full name: Dean Paul Williams
- Date of birth: 5 January 1972 (age 54)
- Place of birth: Tamworth, England
- Height: 6 ft 2 in (1.88 m)
- Position: Goalkeeper

Youth career
- –: Birmingham City

Senior career*
Years	Team	Apps	(Gls)
1990–1992	Birmingham City	4	(0)
1991	→ Cobh Ramblers (loan)	21	(0)
1992–1993	Tamworth	34	(0)
1993–1994	Brentford	7	(0)
1994–1997	Doncaster Rovers	83	(0)
1997	→ Huddersfield Town (loan)	0	(0)
1997–1998	Gateshead	24	(0)
1998–2001	Telford United	74	(0)
2001–2004	TNS	71	(0)
2004	Aberystwyth Town	14	(0)
2004–2005	Forest Green Rovers	23	(0)
2005–2007	Stafford Rangers	48	(0)
Total		403	(0)
- * Club domestic league appearances and goals

Dean Williams (born 5 January 1972) is an English former footballer who played as a goalkeeper. He went on to make nearly 100 appearances in the Football League playing for Birmingham City, Brentford and Doncaster Rovers, and represented Welsh Premier League clubs TNS in the UEFA Cup and Aberystwyth Town in the Intertoto Cup.

== Playing career ==
Williams, born in Tamworth, Staffordshire, signed for Birmingham City on schoolboy forms at 14. When he left school in 1988, he was accepted as a trainee under the Youth Training Scheme (YTS) system and turned professional in 1990. He made his first-team debut for Birmingham at the age of 18 years, 109 days, on 24 April 1990 in a 2–1 defeat at home to Notts County. A spell on loan in Republic of Ireland with Cobh Ramblers followed in 1991. Birmingham used five different goalkeepers, including Alan Miller and Kevin Dearden on loan from Arsenal and Tottenham Hotspur respectively, during the 1991–92 season, but Williams was not one of those five; he was released in March 1992 and joined Tamworth.

Williams played for Brentford in the 1993–94 season before joining Doncaster Rovers in August 1994. He spent three seasons with the club, making nearly 100 first-team appearances, before moving on to Gateshead in late 1997. Released by the club at the end of the 1997–98 season following their relegation from the Conference, he joined Telford United in August 1998. He made 90 appearances for the club before joining Welsh Premier League club Total Network Solutions (TNS) in 2001.

In nearly three seasons with TNS, Williams played 72 games in all competitions, including representing the club in the 2003–04 UEFA Cup, conceding only twice in the second leg of the qualifying round against Manchester City at the Millennium Stadium. After a dispute with the club's management, Williams' contract was terminated. He had planned to take TNS to an employment tribunal, but the parties reached a financial agreement before the hearing.

He signed for Aberystwyth Town, playing in the 2004 UEFA Intertoto Cup against Dinaburg and keeping a clean sheet in the first leg, and also played six games in the Welsh Premier League, before moving on in September 2004 to Forest Green Rovers, for whom he played 23 games in the Conference. Williams then moved on to Stafford Rangers, helping them to runners-up spot in the Conference North and promotion via a man-of-the-match performance in the play-off final in which he saved Droylsden's first kick in the penalty shootout. He played nine times for the club in the Conference before retiring at the age of 35 due to injury.

== Later career ==
Williams joined Telford United as a part-time goalkeeping coach in 2008. In 2014, he was head goalkeeping coach at a Tamworth-based academy.
