= Shane Westley =

English footballer and manager

Personal information
- Full name: Shane Lee Mark Westley
- Date of birth: 16 June 1965 (age 61)
- Place of birth: Canterbury, England
- Height: 6 ft 2 in (1.88 m)
- Position: Centre back

Youth career
- Charlton Athletic

Senior career*
Years	Team	Apps	(Gls)
1983–1985	Charlton Athletic	8	(0)
1985–1989	Southend United	144	(10)
1989–1992	Wolverhampton Wanderers	50	(2)
1992–1995	Brentford	64	(1)
1995	→ Southend United (loan)	5	(0)
1995	Cambridge United	3	(0)
1995–1996	Lincoln City	9	(1)
Total		283	(14)

Managerial career
- 1998: Lincoln City
- 1999: Barrow
- * Club domestic league appearances and goals

Shane Lee Mark Westley (born 16 June 1965) is an English former professional footballer and coach.

== Playing career ==
A defender, Westley began his career at Charlton Athletic in 1983 but he made his big breakthrough with Southend United, for whom he made 142 appearances, twice winning promotion out of the (old) Division Four. He spent a spell on loan with Norwich City where he failed to make an appearance before Wolverhampton Wanderers paid £150,000 for his services. After 50 outings he signed for Brentford in a £100,000 deal and made 64 appearances before a brief loan spell back at Southend United.

A move to Cambridge United followed, although he made only 3 appearances before moving to Lincoln City for £7,500 where he made his first strides into management as Assistant Manager to John Beck. Westley played 8 times for Lincoln, bringing to an end a playing career that spanned 283 games and 14 goals along the way.

== Managerial career ==
Beck left Lincoln in March 1998 and Westley was appointed as his replacement, steering the Imps to promotion to the old Division Two at the end of the season. However a poor start resulted in him being sacked in November 1998.

In January 1999, Westley surprisingly took up the position of manager at non-league Barrow, with Beck joining him in a consultancy role. With the club itself in disarray financially, it was a short lived tenure and both Westley and Beck had left by June 1999.

In February 2001, John Beck was re-appointed as manager of Cambridge United, a club he had managed from 1990 to 1992. He appointed Westley as his assistant and they successfully steered the club away from relegation. The following season started poorly however and both Beck and Westley left the club in November 2001.

== Personal life ==
Westley is now managing director of Bodywize, a personal training company.
