= Robert Taylor (footballer, born 1971) =

English footballer (born 1971)

Personal information
- Full name: Robert Anthony Taylor
- Date of birth: 30 April 1971 (age 55)
- Place of birth: Norwich, England
- Position: Forward

Youth career
- Watton United

Senior career*
Years	Team	Apps	(Gls)
1990–1991	Norwich City	0	(0)
1990	→ Mjølner (loan)	5	(1)
1991	→ Leyton Orient (loan)	3	(1)
1991	Birmingham City	0	(0)
1991–1994	Leyton Orient	73	(20)
1994–1998	Brentford	183	(58)
1998–1999	Gillingham	61	(33)
1999–2000	Manchester City	12	(5)
2000–2002	Wolverhampton Wanderers	9	(0)
2001	→ Queens Park Rangers (loan)	3	(0)
2001–2002	→ Gillingham (loan)	11	(0)
2002	→ Grimsby Town (loan)	4	(1)
2002–2003	Grimsby Town	1	(0)
2003	Scunthorpe United	8	(0)
2004	Gorleston	3	(1)
2008–2012	Diss Town	3	(0)
Total		389	(126)

Managerial career
- 2003–2004: Watton United
- 2004: King's Lynn (caretaker)
- 2004–2008: Dereham Town
- 2008–2012: Diss Town
- 2013: Mundford
- 2016: Swaffham Town
- 2017: Acle United
- 2019–2021: Watton United
- * Club domestic league appearances and goals

Robert Anthony Taylor (born 30 April 1971) is an English former professional footballer, licensed football agent and manager.

As a player he was a forward and was active as a professional between 1990 and 2003. Although featuring for Wolverhampton Wanderers and Manchester City, he notably had lengthy and prolific spells with Leyton Orient, Brentford and Gillingham. He notably scored for the Gills at Wembley Stadium in the 1999 Division Two Play-off final against Manchester City, only months before he would join The Blues. Taylor also played professionally for Norwich City, Queens Park Rangers, Grimsby Town and Scunthorpe United. He retired in 2003 following a brief spell with non-League side Gorleston, although whilst manager of Diss Town he did make three more senior appearances between 2008 and 2012. Since retiring Taylor has managed at non-League level for Watton United, King's Lynn Town, Dereham Town, Diss Town, Mundford, Swaffham Town and Acle United.

== Playing career ==
Born in Norwich, Taylor played for Watton United's youth team. He was first spotted after playing for Watton United's first team at the age of 15 against Norwich City's reserves in a pre-season friendly.

A forward, Taylor failed to make a first-team appearance for Norwich, making his professional debut in 1991 whilst on loan at Leyton Orient. He spent August and September 1990 with Norwegian side Mjølner to gain further experience. He played five games and scored one goal for Mjølner in the second tier of the Norwegian league during a loan spell that lasted until the end of the season in Norway.

In August 1991, Taylor began a trial with Birmingham City which led to a one-month contract in September, but he made no first-team appearances. He ultimately joined former loan club Leyton Orient, where he scored 20 goals in 81 appearances before moving to Brentford where he scored 74 goals in 208 appearances.

In 1998, he signed for Gillingham for a then club-record fee of £500,000. Playing under manager Tony Pulis Taylor enjoyed the best goal scoring run of his career, totalling 39 goals in 70 games. This included five goals in a single game away to Burnley in February 1999. Taylor played and scored in the 1999 Second Division play-off final against Manchester City.

Taylor remained with the club until November 1999 when he signed for Manchester City for £1.5 million. Playing for the club as it gained promotion from the First Division, he scored 5 goals in 12 appearances.

In 2000, he signed for Wolverhampton Wanderers for £1.55 million on a four-year deal, commenting that City's signings of Paolo Wanchope and George Weah meant his playing time would be limited at the club. He only made 12 first team appearances for Wolves, scoring three goals and suffered with then-undiagnosed circulatory problems in his legs. Whilst at the club he was sent on loan to Queens Park Rangers, Grimsby Town and his former club Gillingham.

Leaving Wolves in 2002 he then signed permanently for Grimsby Town, before ending his professional career with Scunthorpe United.

He also went on to play for non-League club Gorleston. In 2008, while Diss Town manager, he made a brief playing comeback early in the 2008–09 season.

== Managerial career ==
Taylor moved into management with Watton United, King's Lynn (as caretaker manager), Dereham Town, Diss Town, Mundford and more recently Swaffham Town.

In 2019, he returned to Watton United as manager.

== Personal life ==
As a child Taylor supported Liverpool, citing Kenny Dalglish and Ian Rush as his inspiration.

In 2016, Taylor launched a football agency, TG-Inspire.

== Career statistics ==
Appearances and goals by club, season and competition
Club	Season	League			FA Cup		League Cup		Other		Total	
Club	Season	Division	Apps	Goals	Apps	Goals	Apps	Goals	Apps	Goals	Apps	Goals
Leyton Orient (loan)	1990–91	Third Division	3	1	—		—		—		3	1
Brentford	1993–94	Second Division	5	2	—		—		—		5	2
Brentford	1994-95	Second Division	43	23	2	1	4	1	4 (Note: Two appearances in Second Division play-offs; two appearances in Football League Trophy)	0	53	25
Brentford	1995–96	Second Division	42	11	4	3	4	1	2 (Note: Appearances in Football League Trophy)	1	52	16
Brentford	1996–97	Second Division	43	7	3	2	4	1	6 (Note: Three appearances, two goals in Second Division play-offs; three appearances, one goal in Football League Trophy)	3	56	13
Brentford	1997–98	Second Division	40	13	1	2	4	3	1	0	46	18
Brentford	Total		173	56	10	8	12	6	13	4	208	74
Gillingham	1998–99	Second Division	43	16	1	0	1	0	6 (Note: Three appearances, two goals in Second Division play-offs; three appearances, three goals in Football League Trophy)	5	51	21
Gillingham	1999-00	Second Division	15	15	2	2	2	1	—		19	18
Gillingham	Total		58	31	3	2	3	1	6	5	70	39
Manchester City	1999-00	First Division	12	5	—		—		—		12	5
Wolverhampton Wanderers	2000–01	First Division	9	0	0	0	3	3	—		12	3
Queens Park Rangers (loan)	2001–02	Second Division	3	0	—		—		—		3	0
Gillingham (loan)	2001–02	First Division	11	0	—		0	0	—		11	0
Gillingham (loan)	Gillingham total		69	31	3	2	3	1	6	5	81	39
Grimsby Town (loan)	2001–02	First Division	4	1	—		—		—		4	1
Grimsby Town	2002–03	First Division	1	0	0	0	0	0	—		1	0
Grimsby Town	Grimsby Town total		5	1	0	0	0	0	—		5	1
Scunthorpe United	2002–03	Third Division	8	0	—		—		—		8	0
Gorleston	2004–05	Eastern Counties League Premier Division	3	1	0	0	—		0	0	3	1
Diss Town	2008–09	Eastern Counties League First Division	3	0	0	0	—		0	0	3	0
Career total			288	95	13	10	18	10	19	9	338	124

== Honours ==
=== As a player ===
Manchester City

- Football League First Division runner-up: 1999-2000

Individual

- Brentford Player of the Season: 1995–96
- Gillingham Player of the Season: 1998–99

=== As a manager ===
Diss Town

- Eastern Counties League First Division third-place promotion: 2010–11
