= Simon Ratcliffe =

English footballer and manager

Personal information
- Full name: Simon Ratcliffe
- Date of birth: 8 February 1967 (age 59)
- Place of birth: Davyhulme, England
- Height: 5 ft 11 in (1.80 m)
- Position: Defender

Youth career
- 1983–1985: Manchester United

Senior career*
Years	Team	Apps	(Gls)
1985–1987	Manchester United	0	(0)
1987–1989	Norwich City	9	(0)
1989–1995	Brentford	214	(14)
1995–1998	Gillingham	105	(10)
Total		328	(24)

International career
1983–1984	England U17	9	(0)
1984	England Youth	1	(0)
1985	England U20	3	(0)

Managerial career
- 2014–: Gillingham Ladies
- * Club domestic league appearances and goals

Simon Ratcliffe (born 8 February 1967) is an English former professional football player, who was previously manager of Gillingham Ladies and the Gillingham Girls Academy. His clubs included Norwich City, Brentford and Gillingham, where he made over 100 Football League appearances.

== Playing career ==
Born in Davyhulme, Ratcliffe began his footballing career as a Manchester United apprentice on leaving school in 1983, and two years later was granted a professional contract by manager Ron Atkinson. However, he never played a first team game for United and was transferred to Norwich City, their First Division rivals, in 1987 - by which time United were being managed by Alex Ferguson.

Ratcliffe joined the Canaries at one of the most successful points in their history, when they had just finished fifth in the league a season after promotion. Though Ratcliffe would not be guaranteed a first team place at Carrow Road, his chances of first team action in Norfolk would be better than they had been at Old Trafford. He managed nine league appearances over the next two years, before leaving in 1989 - at the end of what was arguably the most successful season in Norwich's history, when they finished fourth in the league and reached the FA Cup semi-finals, although Ratcliffe did not make any league appearances.

On leaving Norwich, Ratcliffe signed for Third Division Brentford for a club record incoming fee of £100,000. He was soon a regular first team player, helping them win the Third Division title in 1992 and gain a place in the new Division One (as the Second Division was called following the creation of the FA Premier League for the 1992-93 season). For a while Brentford were looking like they could establish themselves as a Division One club and possibly even push for a place in the Premier League, as they entered 1993 in tenth place and just one point outside the playoff zone, but a dreadful run of form in the second half of the season saw them relegated on the final day of the season. Two years later, they finished second in Division Two but were denied automatic promotion because of a restructuring of the league. They lost to Huddersfield Town in the playoff semi-finals and remained in Division Two, while Ratcliffe dropped down a division to sign for Gillingham.

When Ratcliffe signed for Gillingham, new owner Paul Scally had rescued the club from the brink of bankruptcy and appointed Tony Pulis as manager. Ratcliffe was a regular player in the side that won promotion from Division Three that season, and helped them stay in Division Two before playing his last professional game for them in 1998 at the age of 31.

== Managerial career ==
Ratcliffe returned to Gillingham in August 2014 to take over the managerial positions at Gillingham Ladies and Gillingham's Girls Academy.

== Honours ==
Brentford

- Football League Third Division: 1991–92
