= Mickey Bennett =

English footballer (born 1969)

Personal information
- Full name: Michael Richard Bennett
- Date of birth: 27 July 1969 (age 57)
- Place of birth: Camberwell, London, England
- Height: 5 ft 10 in (1.78 m)
- Position: Winger

Senior career*
Years	Team	Apps	(Gls)
1987–1990	Charlton Athletic	35	(2)
1990–1992	Wimbledon	18	(2)
1992–1994	Brentford	46	(4)
1994–1995	Charlton Athletic	24	(1)
1995–1996	Millwall	2	(0)
1996–1997	Cardiff City	14	(1)
1997	Cambridge City	10	(6)
1997–1998	Leyton Orient	2	(0)
1998–1999	Brighton & Hove Albion	38	(0)
- Canvey Island
Total		189	(16)

International career
- England U19
- * Club domestic league appearances and goals

Michael Richard Bennett (born 27 August 1969) is an English former professional footballer who played as a winger. During his career, he made over 150 appearances in the Football League. Since his retirement from playing, Bennett has become involved with helping footballers dealing with depression and is currently the head of player welfare at the Professional Footballers' Association.

== Career ==
Bennett had represented England at youth level, including being included in an England under-20 tour of Brazil, but his career was disrupted by a serious knee injury sustained in a match against Queens Park Rangers in 1989 while playing for Charlton Athletic. He was originally told that he would be out for six weeks but was kept out of the game for nine months when it was revealed he had ruptured his anterior cruciate ligament and crushed the cartilage in his knee. Bennett has admitted that, although he returned to league football, he never recovered from the injury, largely due to the mental stress it caused and retired from football at the age of 29.

Bennett set up an organisation called Unique Sports Counselling to help footballers deal with mental health issues.

== Honours ==
Canvey Island

- FA Trophy: 2000–01
