= Barry Ashby =

English footballer (born 1970)

Personal information
- Full name: Barry John Ashby
- Date of birth: 21 November 1970 (age 55)
- Place of birth: Park Royal, London, England
- Height: 6 ft 2 in (1.88 m)
- Position: Central defender

Youth career
- 1985–1988: Watford

Senior career*
| Years | Team | Apps | (Gls) |
| 1988–1994 | Watford | 114 | (3) |
| 1994–1997 | Brentford | 121 | (4) |
| 1997–2005 | Gillingham | 273 | (7) |
| 2005–2006 | Welling United | 15 | (0) |
| Total | | 523 | (14) |

Managerial career
- 2008: Margate
- * Club domestic league appearances and goals

Barry John Ashby (born 21 November 1970) is an English former professional footballer who played as a centre-half. He played for Watford, Brentford and Gillingham during a 17-year professional career.

Ashby started his career at Watford, having played for Middlesex and London schools teams. As a schoolboy he first became attached to the club in October 1985, before becoming a trainee in July 1987. He won the 1988–89 FA Youth Cup with Watford, forming a defensive partnership with Jason Soloman. He signed a professional contract in December 1988.

Played as both a centre half and full-back by Watford, Ashby's first goal was one of seven scored against Bradford City in December 1989. In March 1994 Watford signed Brentford centre-half Keith Millen for £65,000 and Ashby, who was valued at £35,000 in the exchange. Ashby went on to play 120 league games for Brentford in three years at the club, and was named player of the season in 1996–97.

Ashby then signed for Gillingham in September 1997 for a tribunal fee of £140,000. While with the club Ashby played in both the 1999 and 2000 Football League Second Division play-off finals at Wembley, losing to Manchester City in 1999 on penalties, but achieving promotion to the second-tier for the first time in the Kent side's history in 2000 after defeating Wigan Athletic 3–2 (after extra time). During his time at Gillingham, Ashby made over 320 appearances. He was released on 31 May 2005 after he turned down a contract extension on reduced terms.

He made a return to football with Welling United, where he linked up with his former teammates Matt Bodkin and Adrian Pennock, the latter being the Welling manager at the time. Ashby left Welling in May 2006.

On 22 May 2008 Ashby was appointed first-team manager of Margate, but was dismissed from his post just five months later.

In November 2009 he returned to Welling United as assistant-manager to Jamie Day, helping take the club to the 2012 Conference South play off final, where they lost 1–0 to Dartford.

== Personal life ==
After retiring from football Ashby worked in sales in the City of London.

Ashby's son Harrison is also a footballer, and made his Premier League debut for West Ham United on 15 December 2021.

== Honours ==
Gillingham

- Football League Second Division play-offs: 2000

Watford

- FA Youth Cup: 1988–89

Individual

- Brentford Player of the Season: 1996–97
