= Kevin Dearden =

English footballer (born 1970)

Personal information
- Full name: Kevin Charles Dearden
- Date of birth: 8 March 1970 (age 56)
- Place of birth: Luton, England
- Height: 5 ft 11 in (1.80 m)
- Position: Goalkeeper

Youth career
- Luton Town
- 1986–1988: Tottenham Hotspur

Senior career*
| Years | Team | Apps | (Gls) |
| 1988–1993 | Tottenham Hotspur | 2 | (0) |
| 1989 | → Woking (loan) | | |
| 1989 | → Cambridge United (loan) | 15 | (0) |
| 1989 | → Hartlepool (loan) | 10 | (0) |
| 1989 | → Oxford United (loan) | 0 | (0) |
| 1990 | → Swindon Town (loan) | 1 | (0) |
| 1990 | → Peterborough United (loan) | 7 | (0) |
| 1991 | → Hull City (loan) | 3 | (0) |
| 1991 | → Rochdale (loan) | 2 | (0) |
| 1992 | → Birmingham City (loan) | 12 | (0) |
| 1992 | → Portsmouth (loan) | 0 | (0) |
| 1993–1999 | Brentford | 205 | (0) |
| 1999 | → Barnet (loan) | 1 | (0) |
| 1999 | → Huddersfield Town (loan) | 0 | (0) |
| 1999–2001 | Wrexham | 81 | (0) |
| 2001–2005 | Torquay United | 100 | (0) |
| 2006 | Boreham Wood | | |
| Total | | 438 | (0) |
- * Club domestic league appearances and goals

Kevin Charles Dearden (born 8 March 1970) is an English former professional footballer who made more than 400 appearances in the Football League, playing as a goalkeeper for many clubs. He later became a coach, most recently at his home-town club Luton Town.

== Playing career ==
He began his career as an apprentice with Tottenham Hotspur, turning professional on 5 August 1988. In need of first-team experience, he joined Cambridge United on loan on 9 March 1989, making his league debut two days later in a 3–0 away win against Exeter City.

The next season, he joined Hartlepool United on loan in August 1989, moving to Oxford United on loan on 14 December, with a third loan move that season when he joined Swindon Town on 23 March. He moved to Peterborough United on loan on 24 August 1990, with a further loan spell at Hull City, which began on 10 January 1991.

The following season, he was still no closer to gaining a first team place at White Hart Lane, joining Rochdale on loan on 16 August 1991, and Birmingham City on loan on 19 March. He played 12 games for the St. Andrews side, but returned to Tottenham Hotspur, starting the next season on loan to Portsmouth, whom he joined on 6 August 1992. He finally made his debut for Tottenham later that season, coming on as a substitute for the injured Erik Thorstvedt in a 2–1 defeat against Nottingham Forest at the City Ground.

He left White Hart Lane in September 1993, joining Brentford on a free transfer and quickly becoming a regular at Griffin Park, acquiring the nickname "The Flying Pig". He played at Wembley for Brentford, but was on the losing side as Crewe Alexandra won the Second Division play-off final in May 1997. He lost his place in 1998–99 season, joining Barnet on loan on 4 February 1999, before moving to Huddersfield Town on a free transfer on 11 March, having played 213 league games for Brentford.

He failed to appear in the Huddersfield league side and moved to Wrexham on a free transfer on 2 June 1999. He was the first-choice goalkeeper for the following season, missing only one game. He lost his place at the start of the following season to Kristian Rogers, and although he fought back to make 20 league appearances he was released at the end of the season, his final game for Wrexham being in the winning FAW Premier Cup Final side.

He signed on non-contract terms for Torquay United on 9 August 2001 to enable him to be registered in time to play in the opening game of the season away to Bristol Rovers. He soon signed a one-year contract in the knowledge that he would be Roy McFarland's first choice goalkeeper for the 2001–02 season. He began helping manager Leroy Rosenior with the coaching and Plainmoor and although a knee injury forced him into retirement in March 2005, he stayed on until the end of the season as a voluntary coach.

In February 2006 he signed as a player for non-league Boreham Wood.

== Coaching ==
In July 2006 he joined the coaching staff at Brentford briefly for a matter of days before deciding instead to take a full-time post at Millwall. After coaching for Luton, Stevenage and Leyton Orient, he took on a full-time role as goalkeeping coach and chief scout at Leyton Orient in June 2008. When manager Martin Ling and assistant Dean Smith left Orient by mutual consent on 18 January 2009 he was appointed as assistant to Kevin Nugent, caretaker manager for the home match against Southend United on 20 January. He resigned from the club on 8 December 2014 for personal reasons.

On 24 December 2014, Dearden joined home-town club Luton Town as goalkeeping coach, later becoming Team Operations Manager. He left the role in July 2026.
