= 2002–03 Gillingham F.C. season =

English football club season

Gillingham F.C.
2002–03 season
- Chairman: Paul Scally
- Manager: Andy Hessenthaler
- First Division: 11th
- FA Cup: Fourth round
- League Cup: Third round
- Top goalscorer: League: Paul Shaw (12); All: Paul Shaw (12)
- Highest home attendance: 11,093 (v Leeds United, 25 January 2003)
- Lowest home attendance: 6,281 (v Bradford City, 21 April 2003)
Home colours	Away colours

During the 2002–03 English football season, Gillingham F.C. competed in the Football League First Division, the second tier of the English football league system. It was the 71st season in which Gillingham competed in the Football League, and the 53rd since the club was voted back into the league in 1950. It was Gillingham's third consecutive season in the second tier of the English football league system, to which the club had gained promotion for the first time in 2000.

Gillingham won their first three games of the season in August, which placed them first in the league table, but their form for the rest of 2002 was inconsistent and at the end of the calendar year they were in 13th place out of 24 teams. Marlon King, the team's top goalscorer during the previous season, missed the start of the campaign after being sent to prison; he returned to the team within days of his release in October and scored several important goals but then suffered a season-ending injury. Three wins in late February and early March took Gillingham up to 8th place, two places outside the play-offs for promotion to the Premier League, but the team could not improve on this position and ultimately ended the season in 11th place. This represented Gillingham's highest ever finish in the English league system.

Gillingham also competed in two knock-out tournaments. In the FA Cup, the team reached the fourth round but then lost to Leeds United of the Premier League in a replay after holding their opponents to a draw in the initial match. They were also eliminated from the Football League Cup by a Premier League team, losing to Chelsea in the third round. Gillingham played 52 competitive matches, winning 19, drawing 15, and losing 18. Paul Shaw was the team's top goalscorer with 12 goals. Chris Hope made the most appearances, playing in every one of the team's matches for the third consecutive season. The highest attendance recorded at the club's home ground, Priestfield Stadium, was 11,093 for the FA Cup match against Leeds on 25 January.

== Background and pre-season ==
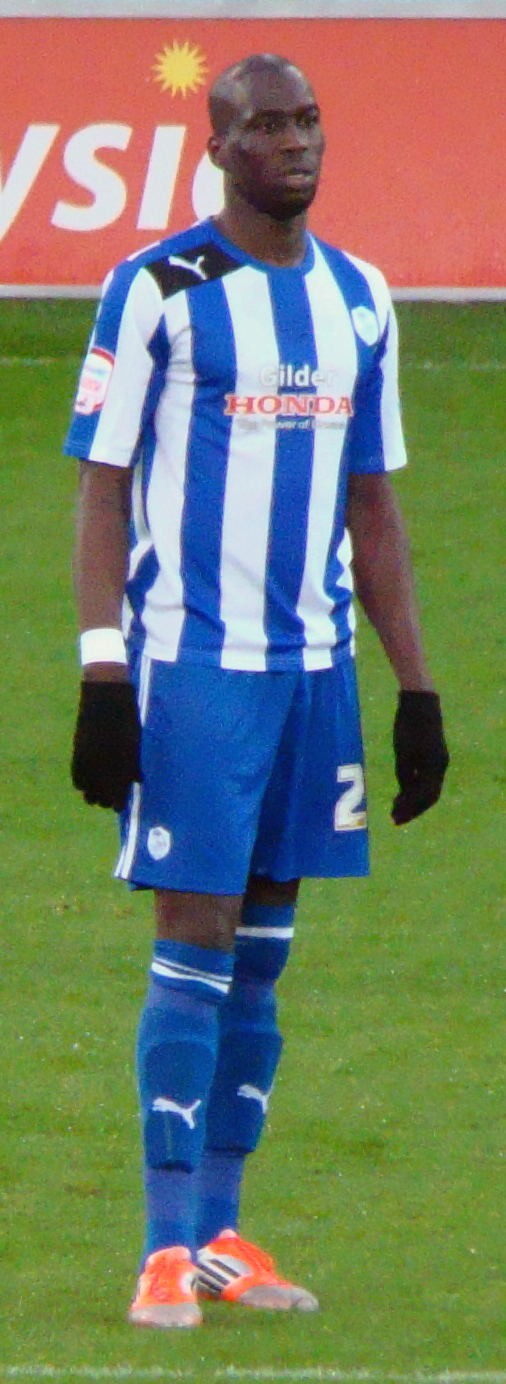
Mamady Sidibé (pictured in 2012) joined Gillingham after impressing the club's management in pre-season games.

The 2002–03 season was Gillingham's 71st season playing in the Football League and the 53rd since the club was elected back into the League in 1950 after being voted out in 1938. In the 1999–2000 season, Gillingham beat Wigan Athletic in the Second Division play-off final to reach the second tier of the English football league system for the first time in the club's history. In the team's first season at this level, Gillingham were seen by pundits as likely to struggle in the First Division and potentially finish 22nd or lower out of 24 teams in the league table, which would result in relegation back to the third tier, but instead the team finished in 13th place. The following season, they improved on this performance, finishing in 12th place.

Andy Hessenthaler was the club's player-manager, a position he had held since 2000. Richard Hill, who had held the title of assistant manager during the previous season, was made joint head coach with Wayne Jones, whose job title had previously been first team coach. Both were not offered new long-term contracts but required to work on week-by-week contracts due to financial issues at the club linked to the collapse of ITV Digital and the resultant loss of the Football League's lucrative TV rights deal with the broadcaster. Shortly after the end of the previous season, Marlon King, Gillingham's top goalscorer during the 2001–02 campaign, was sentenced to 18 months in prison after being caught driving a stolen car the previous year. In his absence, Gillingham signed two experienced forwards on free transfers, 31-year-old Tommy Johnson from Kilmarnock and Rod Wallace, aged 32, from Bolton Wanderers. The club's chairman, Paul Scally, described the signing of Wallace, who had played at the highest level of football in both England and Scotland, as "the biggest acquisition the club has ever made". Days before the new season started, the club also signed another forward, 22-year-old Mamady Sidibé, who had been released by Swansea City at the end of the previous campaign; he was offered a contract after playing for Gillingham in pre-season friendly matches. Hessenthaler told the press: "We see him as the future because we've got a lot of players who are 30-plus and we need to start bringing a few younger ones in."

Gillingham's first-choice kit consisted of shirts, shorts, and socks all in the club's traditional blue; the second-choice kit, to be worn when there was a clash of colours with the opposition and Gillingham were the team required by the rules of the competition to change, was all-white. The team's pre-season games included one against Tottenham Hotspur of the Premier League during which Hessenthaler gave game time to over 20 players. Previewing the season, a writer for The Independent said of Gillingham's prospects that "finishing in the top half [of the league table] might be beyond them". A writer for The Guardian predicted the finishing position of every team in the division and contended that Gillingham would finish 18th.

== First Division ==
=== August–December ===
Gillingham's first game of the season was away to Wimbledon on 10 August. The match drew an attendance of only 2,476, less than half that of any other league game which Gillingham played during the season, as Wimbledon's supporters almost totally boycotted the game in protest against a proposal by their team's owners to relocate the club to Milton Keynes. Both Wallace and Johnson were carrying injuries and Sidibé was chosen to partner Guy Ipoua in attack; Ipoua scored the only goal of the game to give Gillingham a 1–0 victory. Johnson made his debut as a substitute. The first game of the season at Gillingham's home ground, Priestfield Stadium, took place three days later and resulted in a second consecutive 1–0 win, a goal from Paul Shaw securing victory over Derby County, and a third 1–0 victory on 17 August against Millwall meant that Gillingham were the only team in the division to have won their first three games, putting them top of the table. After this strong start, however, the team would only win one of their next ten league games. After coming on as a substitute in every previous game, Johnson was included in the starting line-up for the first time in a 2–0 defeat to Leicester City on 31 August; Wallace made his first Gillingham appearance in the same game as a substitute but he picked up another injury and would be absent from the team for nearly a month.

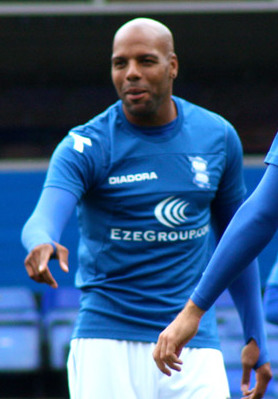
Marlon King (pictured in 2012) made his return to the team in October after his release from prison.

After losing their first game of September to Portsmouth, Gillingham won a league match for the first time in nearly a month when they beat Brighton & Hove Albion 4–2 on 14 September despite finishing the game with nine players after both Mark Saunders and Kevin James were sent off, the latter for a second caution awarded for excessive celebrating after his goal. Four days later, however, Gillingham were heavily defeated, losing 4–1 to Nottingham Forest. Increasing numbers of injuries meant that Hessenthaler was forced to bring several players from the club's youth team into the squad for the game against Sheffield United on 21 September, which ended in a 1–1 draw. Wallace made his first appearance in the starting line-up in a 2–2 draw against Crystal Palace in the final match of September, as did Leon Johnson, a defender signed from Southend United. Jason Brown, the team's goalkeeper, went off injured and was replaced by Vince Bartram, who had been the team's first-choice starter in the position for nearly four seasons before losing his place to Brown in the latter part of the previous campaign. Wallace scored his first goal for Gillingham in a 1–1 draw away to Rotherham United on 12 October, but after that game he would again be out of the team for six weeks. Sidibé returned to the team against Watford on 19 October after over a month out of action and scored a goal within two minutes. Gillingham won 3–0, their first victory in over a month, which moved them up from 13th to 11th in the table.

On 26 October, Gillingham played away to Ipswich Town. King, who had been released from prison just three days earlier after the length of his sentence was reduced following an appeal, was named as a substitute, and took the field during the second half. Sidibé scored to give Gillingham a 1–0 victory which left them in 9th place in the table. Three days later, Gillingham lost 4–0 at home to Wolverhampton Wanderers in a hot-tempered match in which several players were cautioned and Gillingham's Nyron Nosworthy was sent off. Gillingham played five First Division matches in November and failed to record any victories. A goal from Saunders in the 89th minute of the game salvaged a draw away to 23rd-placed Grimsby Town on 2 November, but Gillingham then lost 1–0 at home to Reading, and conceded a 90th-minute equaliser after leading 1–0 for most of the game against Sheffield Wednesday; Hessenthaler was sent off in the latter game. Gillingham lost 1–0 away to Walsall on 23 November, and ended the month with a 1–1 draw against Stoke City; the result meant that they had gone six league games without a win and had slipped to 17th place in the table. Nicky Southall, who had left Gillingham in 2001 to join Bolton Wanderers of the Premier League, made his second debut for Gillingham against Bradford City on 7 December having rejoined the club. King scored twice in a 3–1 victory, Gillingham's first win since 19 October. It was the first of a run of three consecutive victories as Gillingham won 2–0 away to Sheffield Wednesday a week later and then beat Burnley 4–2 at Priestfield on 22 December despite having only 16 fit players from which to select the starting line-up and substitutes. Wallace scored in all three games; the matches against Sheffield Wednesday and Burnley marked the first time he had started two consecutive games all season. A draw against Millwall on 26 December meant that at the end of 2002, Gillingham were in 13th place in the league table.

=== January–May ===
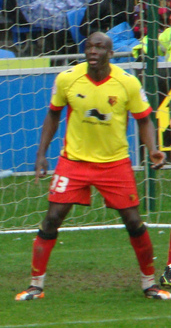
Nyron Nosworthy (pictured in 2012) scored twice in Gillingham's final game of the season.

Gillingham had originally been scheduled to begin 2003 with a home game against Norwich City on 1 January, but it was postponed due to a waterlogged pitch, and so the team's first league game of the calendar year was ten days later away to Derby County. Ipoua scored for Gillingham but Derby equalised and the game ended in a draw, which BBC Sport's report said was a fair result. King suffered a knee injury, and would not play again during the season. A week later, Gillingham played Leicester City, who were second in the table going into the game. A goal from Shaw and an opponent's own goal gave Gillingham a 2–0 lead at half-time but Leicester scored twice after the interval to bring the scores level. In the final five minutes of the game, Wallace set up Sidibé to score and give Gillingham the victory. The team's seven-game unbeaten run in the league ended on 1 February with a 3–0 defeat to Preston North End, who had not won in their preceding six league games, and this was followed by a 2–1 defeat to Reading which meant that Gillingham were again 17th in the table.

The team's run of poor form ended with a 3–0 victory at home to Grimsby Town on 15 February, in which Wallace scored two goals inside the first 15 minutes. After a 1–0 defeat to Portsmouth, who were top of the league table, Wallace scored again to secure a 1–0 victory over play-off contenders Norwich City in the final game of February. Gillingham beat Brighton & Hove Albion 3–0 on 1 March; Tommy Johnson came on as a substitute for Sidibé early in the game and scored the second goal with a penalty kick, only the second time he had scored in 18 First Division appearances. Paul Weaver of The Guardian said the game was decided by Johnson's "class" and named him man of the match. The victory left them 8th in the table, two places below the positions which would result in qualification for the play-offs for promotion to the Premier League. Hessenthaler told the press: "if we can go unbeaten through our next three games, we have a great chance of a play-off place". Three days later, however, Gillingham lost 4–1 at home to Nottingham Forest, ending an unbeaten run of nine games at their own ground; Hessenthaler commented that his team could not deal with their opponents' pace. Shaw scored twice in the next game at home to Wimbledon and Gillingham were winning 3–2 with three minutes of the game remaining but then conceded a goal from a penalty kick and had to settle for a draw. Hessenthaler told the press, "We've been a real force at home but we can't have joke defending like that. Seven goals in two games is just not good enough".

Gillingham beat Watford 1–0 on 18 March with a goal from Shaw after which they were 10th in the table. Four days later, they played away to Wolverhampton Wanderers; Bartram played in goal for the first time in five months. The home team scored five goals before half-time and added a sixth in the second half; the BBC Sport report said that Gillingham had been "ripped apart" and James Copnall of The Daily Telegraph wrote that their defending was "non-existent". It was the first time Gillingham had conceded as many goals in a game since a match against the same opposition in 1989, but despite the defeat, they remained in 10th place. The defeat was the first in a run of six games without a win for Gillingham; after a 2–2 draw away to Sheffield United, they took a 1–0 lead at home to Ipswich Town on 29 March but conceded three goals and lost the match 3–1. In the first three games of April, Gillingham failed to score any goals, drawing 0–0 away to Stoke City and losing 1–0 at home to Walsall and 2–0 away to Burnley. The results left the team 14th in the table, 14 points below the play-off places with only three games remaining and therefore a maximum of nine more points available. The scoreless run ended when a goal from Shaw secured a 1–0 win at home to Bradford City on 29 April. After being held to a goalless draw by Coventry City, who had won only one league game in 2003, Gillingham ended the season with a 2–1 victory at home to Crystal Palace. Nosworthy, normally a defender but playing as a forward due to injuries to King and Wallace, scored both goals, his first for the team for more than three years. The result meant that Gillingham ended the season in 11th place in the First Division, the highest finish in the English football league system in the club's history.

=== League match details ===
Key

- In result column, Gillingham's score shown first
- H = Home match
- A = Away match
- pen. = Penalty kick
- o.g. = Own goal

Results
Date	Opponents	Result	Goalscorers	Attendance
10 August 2002	Wimbledon (A)	1–0	Ipoua	2,476
13 August 2002	Derby County (H)	1–0	Shaw	8,775
17 August 2002	Millwall (H)	1–0	Ipoua	7,543
24 August 2002	Norwich City (A)	0–1		20,588
26 August 2002	Preston North End (H)	1–1	Saunders	7,785
31 August 2002	Leicester City (A)	0–2		30,067
7 September 2002	Portsmouth (H)	1–3	James	8,717
14 September 2002	Brighton & Hove Albion (A)	4–2	Shaw (2), Perpetuini, James	6,733
18 September 2002	Nottingham Forest (A)	1–4	Hessenthaler	16,073
21 September 2002	Sheffield United (H)	1–1	Shaw	7,497
29 September 2002	Crystal Palace (A)	2–2	Perpetuini, Mullins (o.g.)	15,699
5 October 2002	Coventry City (H)	0–2		7,722
12 October 2002	Rotherham United (A)	1–1	Wallace	6,094
19 October 2002	Watford (H)	3–0	Sidibe, Ipoua, James	8,728
26 October 2002	Ipswich Town (A)	1–0	Sidibe	24,176
29 October 2002	Wolverhampton Wanderers (H)	0–4		10,036
2 November 2002	Grimsby Town (A)	1–1	Saunders	5,715
9 November 2002	Reading (H)	0–1		8,511
16 November 2002	Sheffield Wednesday (H)	1–1	T. Johnson	8,028
23 November 2002	Walsall (A)	0–1		6,630
30 November 2002	Stoke City (H)	1–1	Shaw	8,150
7 December 2002	Bradford City (A)	3–1	King (2, 1 pen.), Wallace	10,711
14 December 2002	Sheffield Wednesday (A)	2–0	Wallace, Smith	17,715
21 December 2002	Burnley (H)	4–2	Wallace, Smith (2), King	7,905
26 December 2002	Millwall (A)	2–2	Saunders, King (pen.)	10,947
11 January 2003	Derby County (A)	1–1	Ipoua	22,769
18 January 2003	Leicester City (H)	3–2	Shaw, Elliott (o.g.), Sidibe	8,609
1 February 2003	Preston North End (A)	0–3		12,121
10 February 2003	Reading (A)	1–2	Wallace	11,030
15 February 2003	Grimsby Town (H)	3–0	Wallace (2), Hope	7,158
22 February 2003	Portsmouth (A)	0–1		19,521
25 February 2003	Norwich City (H)	1–0	Wallace	7,935
1 March 2003	Brighton & Hove Albion (H)	3–0	Shaw, T. Johnson (pen.), Southall	9,178
4 March 2003	Nottingham Forest (H)	1–4	Wallace	7,277
11 March 2003	Wimbledon (H)	3–3	Shaw (2), Wallace	7,884
15 March 2003	Rotherham United (H)	1–1	Wallace	7,284
18 March 2003	Watford (A)	1–0	Shaw	10,492
22 March 2003	Wolverhampton Wanderers (A)	0–6		25,171
25 March 2003	Sheffield United (A)	2–2	Osborn, Shaw	15,799
29 March 2003	Ipswich Town (H)	1–3	Smith	8,508
5 April 2003	Stoke City (A)	0–0		12,746
12 April 2003	Walsall (H)	0–1		6,972
19 April 2003	Burnley (A)	0–2		14,031
21 April 2003	Bradford City (H)	1–0	Shaw	6,281
26 April 2003	Coventry City (A)	0–0		14,795
4 May 2003	Crystal Palace (H)	2–1	Nosworthy (2)	9,315

=== Partial league table ===
Football League First Division final table, positions 9–13
Pos	Team	Pld	W	D	L	GF	GA	GD	Pts
9	Millwall	46	19	9	18	59	69	−10	66
10	Wimbledon	46	18	11	17	76	73	+3	65
11	Gillingham	46	16	14	16	56	65	−9	62
12	Preston North End	46	16	13	17	68	70	−2	61
13	Watford	46	17	9	20	54	70	−16	60

== Cup matches ==
=== FA Cup ===
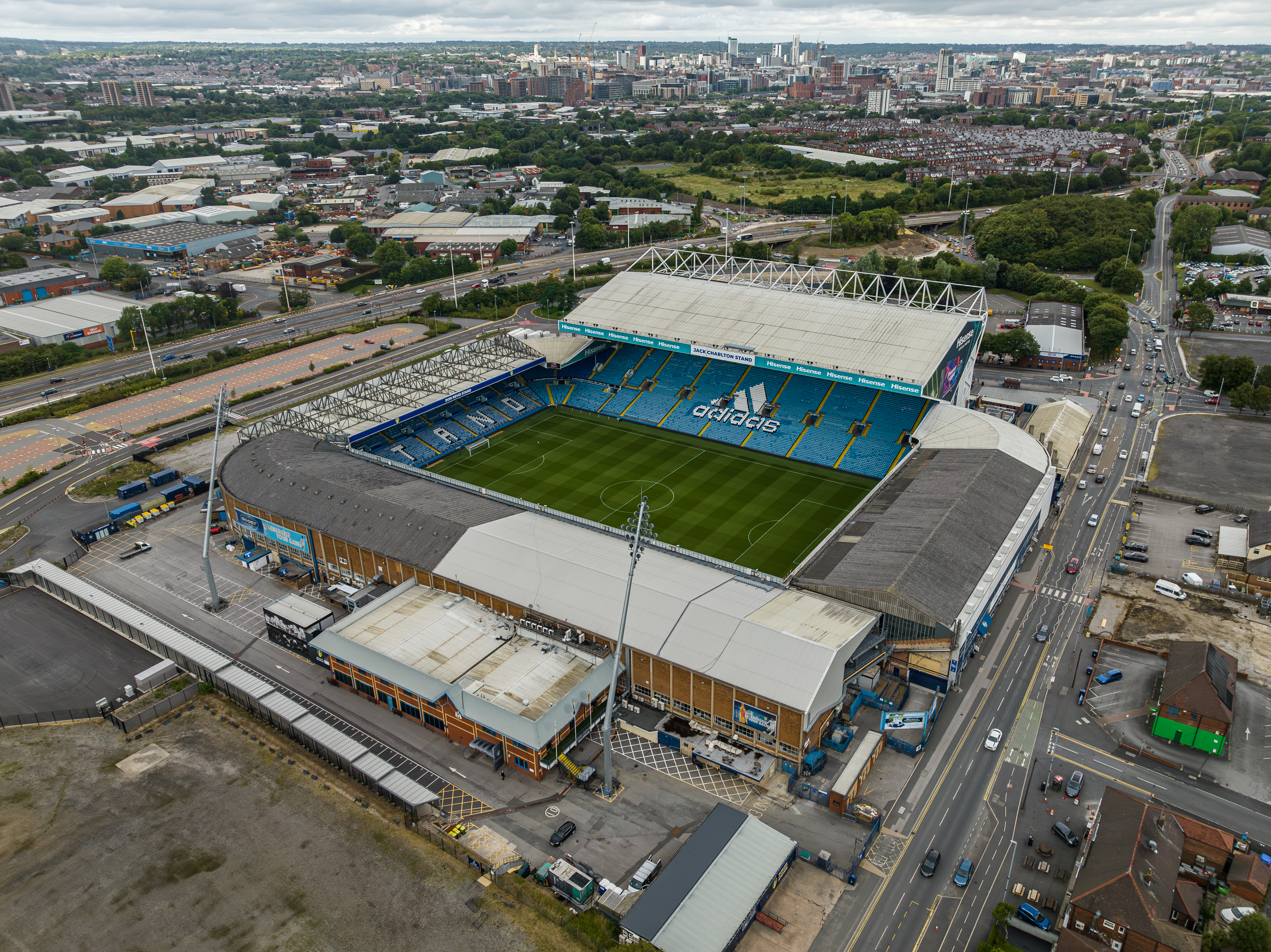
Gillingham were eliminated from the FA Cup at Elland Road (pictured in 2023), home of Leeds United.

As a First Division club, Gillingham entered the 2002–03 FA Cup at the third round stage in January; their opponents were fellow First Division team Sheffield Wednesday. Gillingham conceded a goal within the first five minutes of the game but King scored twice, taking his goal tally to six in his last five games in all competitions; he missed out on a hat-trick when he missed from a second-half penalty kick. Further goals from Ipoua and Chris Hope gave Gillingham a 4–1 victory.

In the fourth round, Gillingham were drawn at home to Leeds United of the Premier League in a match that was selected by Sky Television for a live broadcast, earning the club a fee of £265,000. Even though the match was being shown on television, it drew a crowd of 11,093, the largest attendance of the season at Priestfield. Leeds scored a goal early in the second half but were reduced to ten players when Mark Viduka was sent off for deliberately elbowing Hessenthaler. Within two minutes, Sidibé scored for Gillingham and the match ended in a 1–1 draw, meaning that a replay at Elland Road, Leeds' home ground, was required. Viduka opened the scoring after 11 minutes of the replay and Leeds added another goal in the second half. Gillingham staged a late rally; Ipoua scored a goal with four minutes remaining and in the closing seconds Hessenthaler had a shot on goal saved by goalkeeper Paul Robinson, but Leeds held on for a 2–1 victory, which eliminated Gillingham from the competition.

==== FA Cup match details ====
Key

- In result column, Gillingham's score shown first
- H = Home match
- A = Away match
- pen. = Penalty kick
- o.g. = Own goal

Results
Date	Round	Opponents	Result	Goalscorers	Attendance
7 January 2003	Third	Sheffield Wednesday (H)	4–1	King (2, 1 pen.), Ipoua, Hope	6,434
25 January 2003	Fourth	Leeds United (H)	1–1	Sidibe	11,093
4 February 2003	Fourth (replay)	Leeds United (A)	1–2	Ipoua	29,359

=== Football League Cup ===
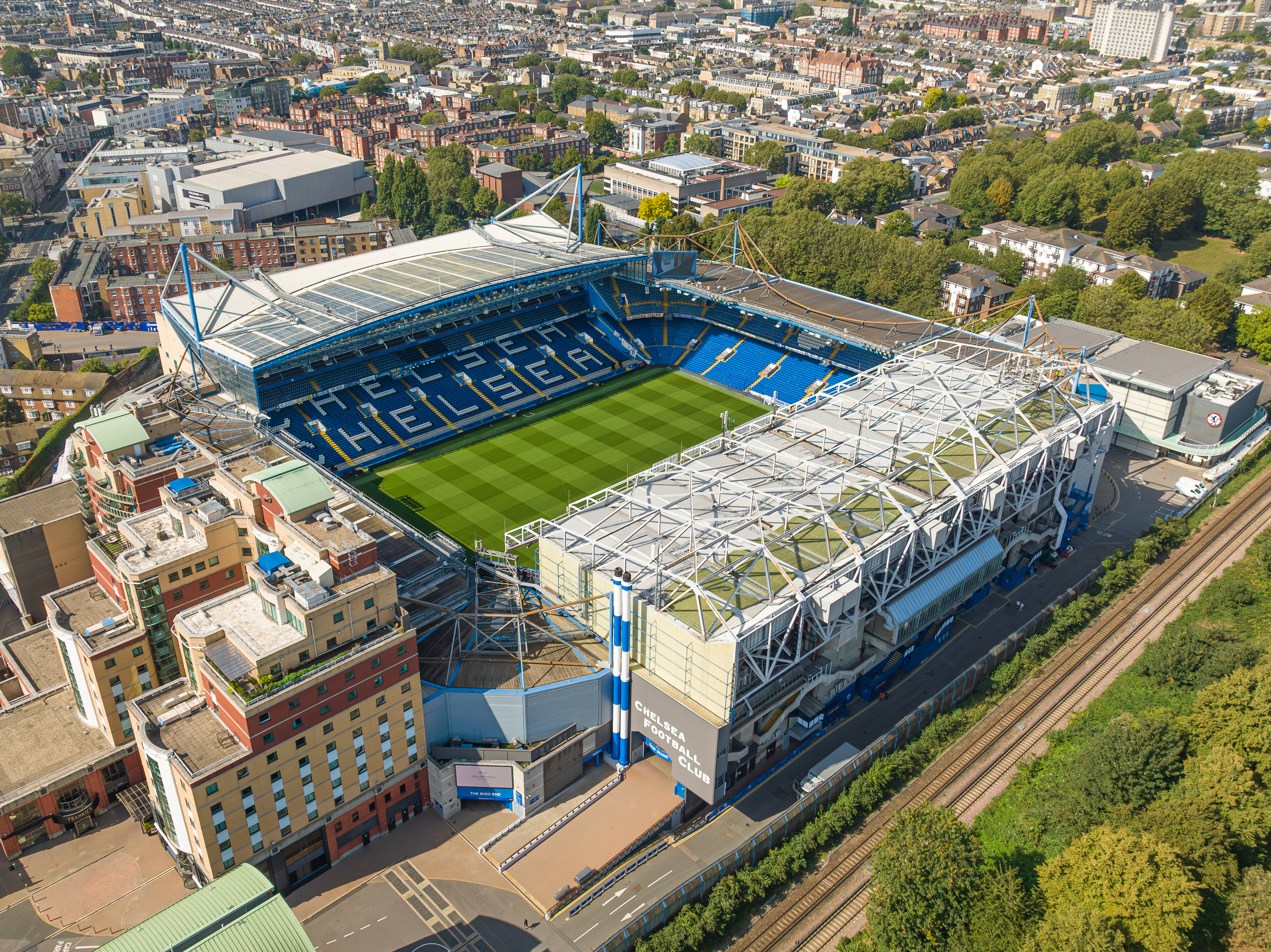
Gillingham were eliminated from the League Cup at Stamford Bridge (pictured in 2012), home of Chelsea.

As a First Division team, Gillingham entered the 2002–03 Football League Cup in the first round; their opponents were Torquay United of the Third Division. Despite what BBC Sport called "a defiant display" from the lower-league team, a goal from Hessenthaler secured a 1–0 victory for Gillingham. In the next round, Gillingham played Stockport County of the Second Division. Gillingham fell behind but Ipoua scored an equaliser; the score remained 1–1 at the end of the regulation 90 minutes and so under the rules of the competition 30 minutes of extra time were played. Tommy Johnson scored what the media described as a "superb strike" and a "wonder goal" during the extra period to give Gillingham a 2–1 victory.

Gillingham's opponents in the third round were Chelsea of the Premier League; it was the third time in four seasons that the two teams had been drawn together in a cup competition following FA Cup matches in 2000 and 2001. The match took place at Chelsea's home ground, Stamford Bridge, and the home team scored after 20 minutes and then doubled their lead in the second half. King scored a goal for Gillingham, his first since his release from prison, in the last minute of the game but his team lost 2–1 and were eliminated from the League Cup.

==== League Cup match details ====
Key

- In result column, Gillingham's score shown first
- H = Home match
- A = Away match
- pen. = Penalty kick
- o.g. = Own goal

Results
10 September 2002	First	Torquay United (A)	1–0	Hessenthaler	1,981
1 October 2002	Second	Stockport County (A)	2–1 (a.e.t.)	Ipoua, T, Johnson	2,396
6 November 2002	Third	Chelsea (A)	1–2	King	28,033

== Players ==
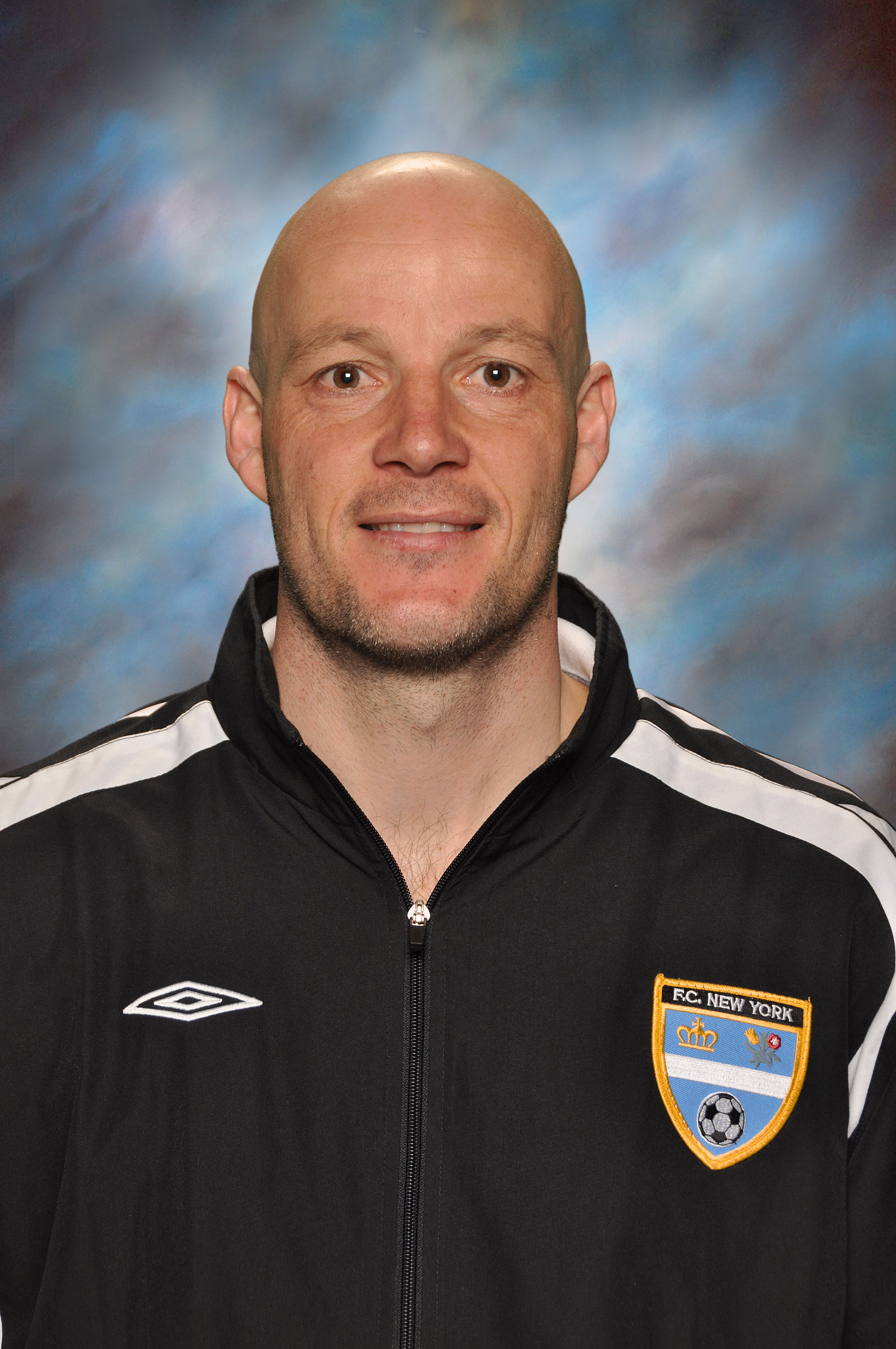
Paul Shaw (pictured in 2011) was the team's top goalscorer.

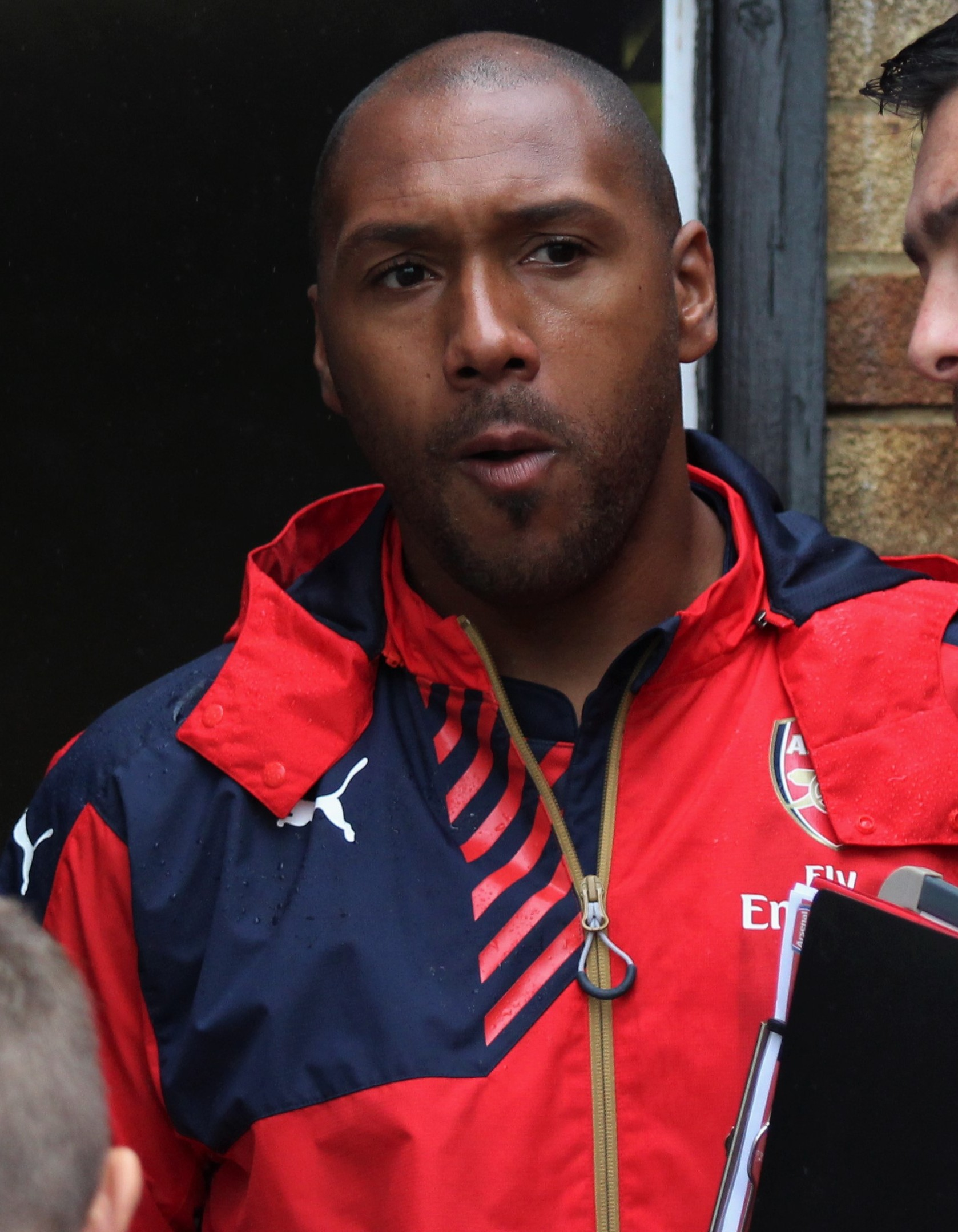
Jason Brown (pictured in 2015) made 39 appearances in goal.

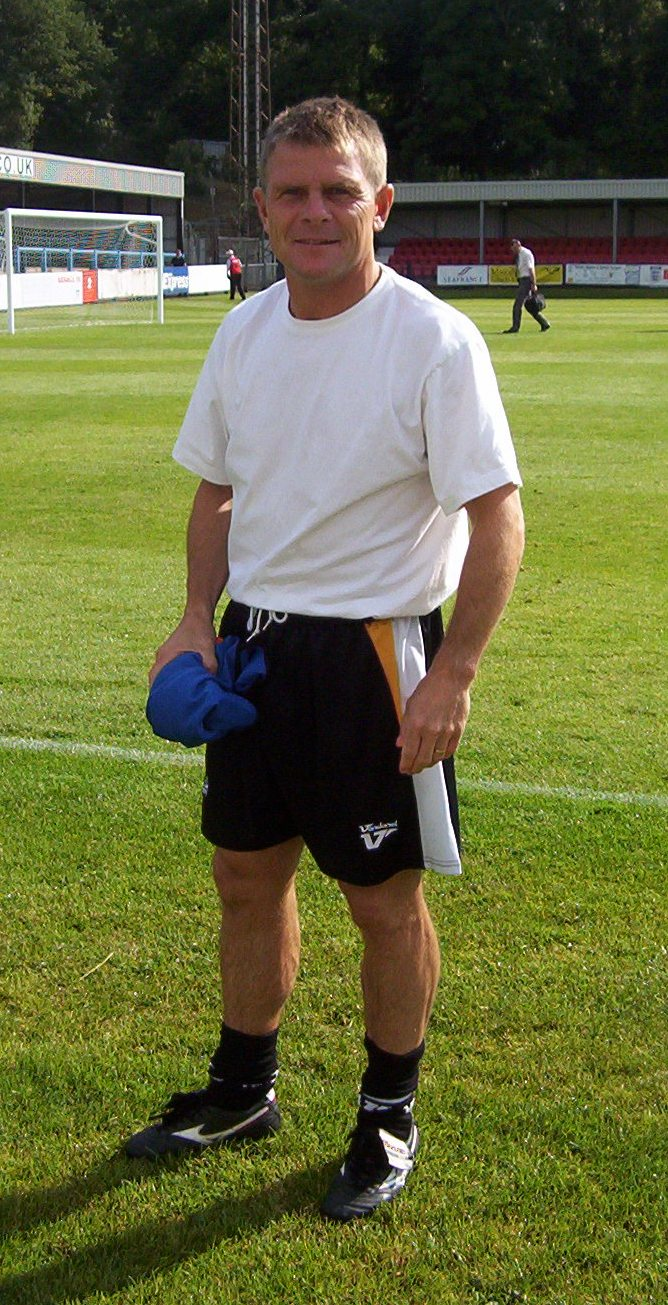
Andy Hessenthaler (pictured in 2009), the team's player-manager, made 38 appearances during the season.

During the season, 27 players made at least one appearance for Gillingham. Hope made the most, playing in every one of the team's 52 games; it was the third consecutive season in which he had been ever-present for the team, taking his run of consecutive appearances for the team since he joined Gillingham in 2000 to 156. Paul Smith played 50 times, and four other players made more than 40 appearances. Six players appeared fewer than five times; the teenager Andrew Crofts was the only one who played in just one game.

Of the 15 players who scored at least one goal for the team, Shaw was the highest scorer with 12, all scored in league games. Wallace scored 11 goals, also all in the league; no other player scored more than seven times.

Player statistics
No.	Player	Position	First Division		FA Cup		League Cup		Total	
No.	Player	Position	Apps	Goals	Apps	Goals	Apps	Goals	Apps	Goals
1	Vince Bartram	GK	8	0	0	0	1	0	9	0
2	Mark Patterson	DF	2	0	0	0	1	0	3	0
3	Roland Edge	DF	34	0	2	0	1	0	37	0
4	Paul Smith	MF	45	4	2	0	3	0	50	4
5	Barry Ashby	DF	38	0	2	0	3	0	43	0
7	Nyron Nosworthy	DF/FW	39	2	2	0	2	0	43	2
8	Andy Hessenthaler	MF	33	1	3	0	2	1	38	2
9	Marlon King	FW	10	4	1	2	1	1	12	7
10	Guy Ipoua	FW	33	4	3	2	3	1	39	7
12	Paul Shaw	MF/FW	44	12	2	0	3	0	49	12
13	Jason Brown	GK	39	0	3	0	2	0	44	0
14	Leon Johnson	DF	18	0	1	0	1	0	20	0
15	Mark Saunders	MF	34	3	2	0	2	0	38	3
16	Richard Rose	DF	2	0	0	0	1	0	3	0
17^{[a]}	Adrian Pennock	DF	3	0	0	0	0	0	3	0
17^{[a]}	Akwasi Edusei	DF	2	0	0	0	0	0	2	0
18	Chris Hope	DF	46	1	3	1	3	0	52	2
19	Rod Wallace	FW	22	11	2	0	1	0	25	11
20	Kevin James	DF/FW	15	3	1	0	1	0	17	3
21	Simon Osborn	MF	18	1	0	0	0	0	18	1
22	Danny Spiller	MF	10	0	1	0	2	0	13	0
23	Tommy Johnson	FW	26	2	1	0	2	1	29	3
26	David Perpetuini	DF	29	2	1	0	3	0	33	2
27	Jones Awuah	FW	4	0	0	0	0	0	4	0
28	Andrew Crofts	MF	0	0	0	0	1	0	1	0
29	Mamady Sidibé	FW	30	3	3	1	1	0	34	4
30	Nicky Southall	MF/DF	24	1	3	0	0	0	27	1

FW = Forward, MF = Midfielder, GK = Goalkeeper, DF = Defender

a. Edusei was not allocated a squad number until late in the season and was given the number worn earlier in the season by Pennock, who had since left the club.

== Aftermath ==
In terms of league standings, the 2002–03 season proved to be the peak of Gillingham's time in the second tier of English football. The following season, they finished 21st, level on points with 22nd-placed Walsall and avoiding relegation only by virtue of a superior goal difference. Hessenthaler resigned as manager in November 2004 as the team again struggled near the foot of the renamed Football League Championship, and at the end of the 2004–05 season Gillingham were relegated, ending a five-season spell in the division. As of 2024, the club has never returned to the second tier of English football.
