= 2003–04 Gillingham F.C. season =

English football club season

Gillingham
2003–04 season
- Chairman: Paul Scally
- Manager: Andy Hessenthaler
- First Division: 21st
- FA Cup: Fourth round
- League Cup: Third round
- Top goalscorer: League: Patrick Agyemang, Paul Shaw, Danny Spiller (all 6); All: Patrick Agyemang, Paul Shaw, Mamady Sidibé, Danny Spiller (all 6)
- Highest home attendance: 11,418 (v. West Ham United, 20 September 2003)
- Lowest home attendance: 6,923 (v. Crewe Alexandra, 8 November 2003)
Home colours	Away colours

During the 2003–04 English football season, Gillingham F.C. competed in the Football League First Division, the second tier of the English football league system. It was the 72nd season in which Gillingham competed in the Football League, and the 54th since the club was voted back into the league in 1950. It was Gillingham's fourth consecutive season in the second tier of the English league system, to which the club had gained promotion for the first time in 2000.

Gillingham's results in the first half of the league season were inconsistent; a run of four consecutive defeats in September and October left the team in 20th place in the First Division league table, only two positions above the bottom three places which would result in relegation to the Second Division at the end of the season. The team won their final two games of 2003, the first time Gillingham had won two consecutive league matches during the season, leaving them in 15th place after 25 out of 46 games. Poorer results from January onwards, including a run of seven games in only one of which the team scored a goal, meant that Gillingham again slipped close to the foot of the table. Going into the final match of the campaign, Gillingham could still finish in the relegation places, but a goalless draw with Stoke City meant that they ended the season in 21st place, level on points with 22nd-placed Walsall but above them due to a superior goal difference.

Gillingham also competed in two knock-out tournaments. In the FA Cup, they defeated Charlton Athletic of the top-tier FA Premier League in the third round before losing in the fourth round to fellow First Division team Burnley. They were eliminated from the Football League Cup in the third round. Gillingham played 51 competitive matches during the season, winning 17, drawing 9, and losing 25. Patrick Agyemang, Paul Shaw, Mamady Sidibé, and Danny Spiller tied as the team's top goalscorer with six goals each, the lowest figure with which a player had finished the season as Gillingham's top scorer in the club's time in the Football League. Sidibé made the most appearances, playing 45 times. The highest attendance recorded at the club's home ground, Priestfield Stadium, was 11,418 for the league match against West Ham United on 20 September.

== Background and pre-season ==
The 2003–04 season was Gillingham's 72nd in the Football League and the 54th since the club was elected back into the League in 1950 after being voted out in 1938. After 50 seasons spent in the third and fourth levels, Gillingham beat Wigan Athletic in the Second Division play-off final to reach the second tier of the English football league system for the first time in the club's history in 2000. In the team's first season at this level, Gillingham were seen by pundits as likely to struggle in the First Division and potentially finish 22nd or lower out of 24 teams in the league table, which would result in relegation back to the third tier, but instead the team finished in 13th place. In the following two campaigns, they bettered this performance, finishing in 12th place in the 2001–02 season, and 11th in 2002–03, meaning that Gillingham had improved their final league placing for eight consecutive seasons.

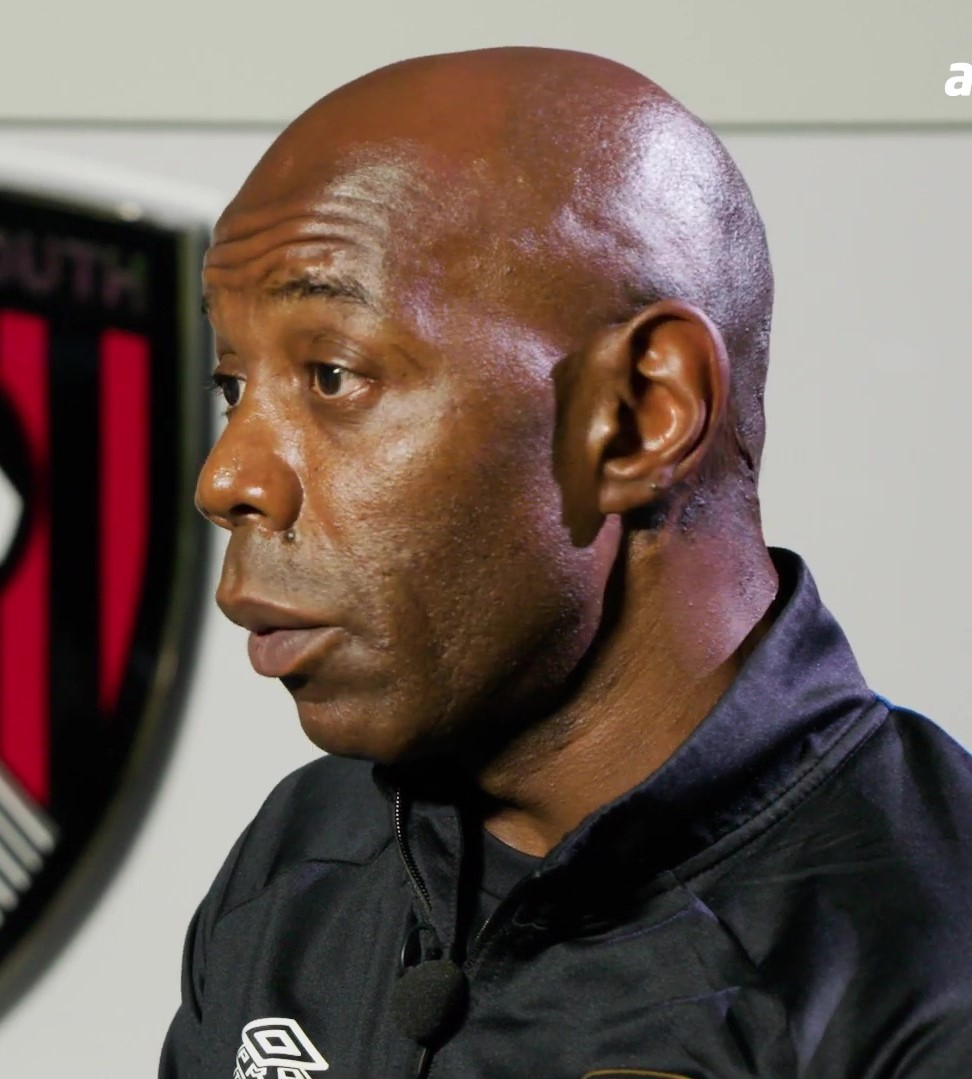
Ian Cox (pictured in 2021) joined Gillingham ahead of the new season.

At the start of the 2003–04 season, Andy Hessenthaler was the team's player-manager, a position he had held since 2000, and Wayne Jones held the post of coach. Four players left the club prior to the new season. Guy Ipoua was released, and Roland Edge left when he and the club could not agree on the terms of a new contract. Simon Osborn joined Walsall even though Hessenthaler was led to believe he had agreed a new contract; the manager was quoted on the club's website as saying ""Everyone knows I was keen to keep Simon. I thought a deal had been done and dusted. It is a major blow [...] These things happen and Simon goes with my best wishes, although I am disappointed." Ty Gooden, who had played a major role in the club's promotion in 2000 but missed the whole of the 2002–03 season due to injury, opted to retire from professional football. Gillingham signed two new players on free transfers, both defenders: John Hills from Blackpool and Ian Cox from Burnley. Writing in the matchday programme for Gillingham's first home game of the season, Hessenthaler said that his aim was for the team to finish in the top six places in the division, which would qualify them for the play-offs for promotion to the FA Premier League. Previewing the season, Nick Szczepanik of The Times noted that Gillingham "seem to have settled down at this level" and predicted that they would finish in a similar position to the previous campaign.

At the conclusion of the 2002–03 season it was announced that the team's first-choice kit for the next campaign would include white shirts rather than the blue which Gillingham had worn for more than 60 years; blue shirts, with the addition of black hoops, would instead form part of the second-choice kit, which would only be worn for those away matches where there was a clash of colours with the home team. The move prompted anger from fans at the break with tradition and a protest outside the club's stadium was organised. The Gills Independent Supporters' Club urged fans to refuse to buy replicas of the white shirt and some supporters sent abusive messages to the club's primary sponsor, the ferry operator SeaFrance, which they believed had been influential in the decision. The club's chairman, Paul Scally, initially attempted to defuse the situation by saying that the first-choice kit would be that of which more replicas were sold in the club shop ahead of the season; a week later he stated that the blue and black kit would be used as first-choice, saying "I think it is time to draw a line under this issue. Personally, I still prefer the white kit, as do most of the players and staff at the club who have seen it, but the blue and black hoops are attractive too so I am perfectly happy with the choice."

Significant redevelopment took place at the club's home ground, Priestfield Stadium, during the close season as the terrace at the Town End was demolished with the intention of a new all-seated stand being built in its place. Financial issues, however, meant that the work had to be postponed and an unroofed temporary stand was erected as an interim measure. As of 2025, the new stand has not been built and the temporary facility remains in place.

== First Division ==
=== August–December ===
Gillingham's first game of the season was away to Sheffield United, who in the previous season had been defeated in the final of the play-offs. Cox and Hills both made their debut for Gillingham in a game which finished 0–0; Gillingham's first league game of the season at Priestfield, against Derby County, also ended goalless. The team's first league win of the season came on 23 August away to Bradford City; Chris Hope scored the only goal in a 1–0 victory. Marlon King, who had been Gillingham's top goalscorer in both the 2000–01 and 2001–02 seasons but missed most of the 2002–03 campaign due to a spell in prison and a serious injury, made his first appearance for the team since January. Two days later, Gillingham played at home to Burnley, who were in 24th place in the table having lost every league game of the season so far, and were defeated 3–0. After Gillingham twice came from behind to secure a 2–2 draw away to Watford, they scored at Priestfield for the first time during the season against Millwall on 6 September. Millwall were twice in the lead before late goals from King and Nyron Nosworthy gave Gillingham a 4–3 victory. Vince Bartram, playing his first game of the season for Gillingham in place of regular goalkeeper Jason Brown, suffered an injury which would ultimately end his playing career; unusually he was injured when he collided with Millwall's goalkeeper, who had joined his team's attack in a desperate attempt to score a last-minute equaliser. In their next game, Gillingham were heavily defeated by Cardiff City, who scored four goals in the first half on their way to a 5–0 victory. Hessenthaler, managing on the sidelines, was ejected from the technical area for arguing with the referee but returned moments later in his playing kit and brought himself on as a substitute.

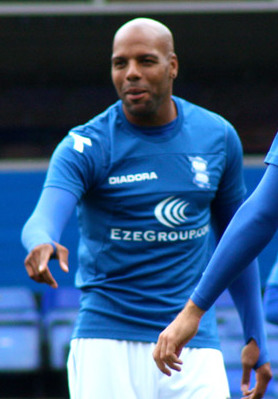
Marlon King (pictured in 2012) left the club in November.

After a 2–1 defeat at home to Norwich City, which left Gillingham in 16th place in the table, they took on West Ham United. Having been relegated from the FA Premier League at the end of the previous season, West Ham were challenging for an immediate return to the top division and were in second place having lost only once in their first seven games. The match drew an attendance of 11,418, the largest of the season at Priestfield. Goals from King and Trevor Benjamin, a loan signing from Leicester City, gave Gillingham a 2–0 victory, the team's first win over West Ham since 1914. After a 1–1 draw with Rotherham United, Gillingham lost 2–1 away to Walsall, in a game which was broadcast live by Sky Sports. The winner came when Hessenthaler attempted to clear a Walsall attack but succeeded only in deflecting the ball past goalkeeper Bertrand Bossu, who had been signed from a semi-professional team and was making his debut in place of the injured Brown. The player-manager described his own goal as "a kick in the teeth" for his team. After a 2–0 defeat at home to West Bromwich Albion, Gillingham were defeated for the third consecutive game on 14 October, losing 2–1 away to Reading. King scored what would prove to be the final goal of his Gillingham career; the highly-rated 23-year-old forward would join Nottingham Forest in late November for a transfer fee reported at £950,000. A fourth consecutive defeat, a 1–0 loss away to Wigan Athletic on 18 October, left Gillingham in 20th place in the table. A week later, despite having to play for most of the second half with only ten men after Hope was sent off, Gillingham ended their run of defeats by beating Crystal Palace 1–0.

Having scored only three goals in the preceding five league games, Gillingham began November by winning 4–3 away to Ipswich Town. They were leading 3–1 early in the second half before Ipswich, who had not lost for six games, scored twice to bring the scores level. In the third minute of stoppage time at the end of the game, Mark Saunders scored a winner for Gillingham. Despite taking an early lead, they lost their next game 3–1 to Sunderland. On 8 November, Gillingham beat Crewe Alexandra 2–0 at Priestfield; Hope was absent from the team as he was suspended as punishment for his sending-off against Crystal Palace. It was the first game he had missed since he joined Gillingham in 2000; his run of 176 consecutive games for the team was the third longest in the club's history. Gillingham lost 1–0 to Wimbledon, who were in 24th place in the table, on 15 November, but then went three league games without defeat for the first time since the opening three games of the season. They looked to have secured a win away to Coventry City when Tommy Johnson scored with five minutes remaining, but Coventry scored again in the final minute and the game finished 2–2. Gillingham beat Stoke City 3–1 in their last match of November, leaving them 14th in the league table at the end of the month. After a goalless draw with Crewe Alexandra, Gillingham lost 1–0 at home to Preston North End on 13 December; Brown was injured and replaced by Bossu at half-time. To cover his absence, Gillingham signed Nico Vaesen on loan from Birmingham City; he became the fourth goalkeeper to play for the team during the season as Gillingham beat Watford 1–0 on 26 December. Two days later, a goal scored by Kevin James less than 30 seconds from the end of the 90 minutes gave Gillingham a 2–1 win away to Millwall. At the end of 2003, Gillingham were in 15th place in the First Division league table.

=== January–May ===
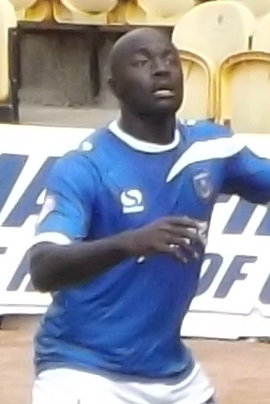
Patrick Agyemang (pictured in 2013) joined Gillingham in January.

Gillingham's first league game of 2004 was also the team's second match of the season to be broadcast on television. Paul Peschisolido scored a hat-trick in a 3–0 win at Priestfield for Sheffield United, who moved up to third place with the victory. Darius Henderson, a forward signed from Reading, made his first start, replacing Paul Shaw, who would complete a transfer to Sheffield United days later for a fee of £75,000. Gillingham lost 2–1 away to Derby County on 17 January, finishing the game with only nine players after both Hills and Cox were sent off. Patrick Agyemang, another new forward, made his debut in the game having joined Gillingham from Wimbledon. In the team's next league match Agyemang scored the only goal of the game as Gillingham beat Bradford City to secure their first league win of 2004 and end January in 16th place in the league table. Gillingham lost 1–0 to Burnley in their first game of February; the match was the first in a run of seven matches in only one of which Gillingham scored a goal. Henderson, in only his sixth match since joining the club, sustained a groin injury which would result in him missing the remainder of the season; he was one of six players now unavailable due to injury, leading Hessenthaler to comment in his programme notes for the next game that "the present situation [regarding injuries] is probably the worst I have known for some time". The veteran Rod Wallace replaced Henderson in the 0–0 draw with Reading on 21 February, his first appearance in the starting line-up since November. In the same game Brown played for the first time in nearly two months, but sustained an injury in training shortly afterwards, leading to Gillingham signing Lars Hirschfeld on loan from Tottenham Hotspur. Gillingham ended the month with a 0–0 draw against Nottingham Forest and a 1–0 defeat to Crystal Palace, meaning that they had not scored a single goal in February.

Gillingham won for the first time in over a month on 6 March, beating Nottingham Forest 2–1. It was the final game of Hirschfield's loan spell at the club; with no goalkeepers fit and available for the game away to Preston North End a week later, Gillingham signed Steve Banks from Wimbledon on a free transfer. It was the second spell at the club for Banks, who had left to join Blackpool in 1995. In addition to signing Banks, Hessenthaler was forced to bring a number of players from the club's youth team into the squad as injuries meant that he only had 12 senior professionals available for selection. Banks became the team's sixth starting goalkeeper of the season in a game that ended goalless. The result left Gillingham in 19th place in the First Division, although they did have the advantage of having more games still to play than every other team in the bottom half of the table. Three days later, Gillingham's Barry Ashby was sent off as his team lost 3–0 to Norwich City. Gillingham beat Rotherham United 2–0 on 20 March, but then began a sequence of five consecutive defeats with a 2–1 reversal away to Sunderland. Their final match of March resulted in a 2–1 defeat away to West Ham United; footage was filmed at the game for the football hooliganism-themed film Green Street, although in the film West Ham's opponents were stated to be Birmingham City. The first game of April ended in a 2–1 defeat at home to Cardiff City; Gillingham's Alan Pouton had a chance to secure a late equaliser with a penalty kick but he missed. This was followed by a 3–0 loss to Wigan Athletic, in which BBC Sport said that "the gulf in class between the two sides was there for all to see".

Gillingham suffered their fifth consecutive defeat on 10 April, losing 1–0 to West Bromwich Albion; the result left Gillingham in 21st place in the table, just one place and one point above the relegation places with five games of the season remaining. The losing run ended with a 3–0 victory over Walsall, in which Agyemang became only the second Gillingham player to score twice in a game during the season, but the team's position in the table remained unchanged. A 2–1 defeat against Ipswich Town on 17 April meant that Gillingham dropped into the relegation places. A week later, Gillingham played away to Wimbledon, whose relegation had already been confirmed; the home team were winning 1–0 early in the second half when a female streaker invaded the pitch. With the home team's staff taking no action, Hessenthaler, frustrated at the delay to the game when his team had begun to dominate the play, ran after her and grappled her off the pitch. Shortly afterwards he scored an equalising goal, and a late goal from Agyemang gave Gillingham the win. In their penultimate game of the season, Gillingham conceded three goals in the first half against Coventry City; despite having Hessenthaler sent off, they pulled two goals back but Coventry scored two more and won 5–2. Heading into the final match of the campaign, away to Stoke City, Gillingham were in 21st place and could still be relegated depending on their own result and that achieved by 22nd-placed Walsall. Tony Pulis, Stoke's manager, had held the same position at Gillingham until 1999 when he was dismissed for gross misconduct, leading to a lengthy and acrimonious legal dispute with Scally. In his column in the matchday programme, Pulis offered "the warmest of welcomes to almost everyone from my old club". At half-time the match was goalless; with news reaching the stadium during the second half that Walsall were winning by a single goal, Gillingham knew that if that result remained the same a draw would be sufficient for them to escape relegation on goal difference. They adopted a defensive strategy for the remainder of the game and the final score was 0–0, meaning that both Gillingham and Walsall ended the season with 51 points but Gillingham finished in 21st place, avoiding relegation, as their goal difference of −19 was one better than Walsall's −20.

=== League match details ===
Key

- In result column, Gillingham's score shown first
- H = Home match
- A = Away match
- pen. = Penalty kick
- o.g. = Own goal

Results
Date	Opponents	Result	Goalscorers	Attendance
9 August 2003	Sheffield United (A)	0–0		21,569
16 August 2003	Derby County (H)	0–0		7,850
23 August 2003	Bradford City (A)	1–0	Hope	10,317
25 August 2003	Burnley (H)	0–3		7,645
30 August 2003	Watford (A)	2–2	Shaw, Spiller	12,793
6 September 2003	Millwall (H)	4–3	Sidibé, Shaw, King, Nosworthy	8,237
13 September 2003	Cardiff City (A)	0–5		15,057
16 September 2003	Norwich City (H)	1–2	King	8,022
20 September 2003	West Ham United (H)	2–0	King, Benjamin	11,418
27 September 2003	Rotherham United (A)	1–1	Spiller	5,501
29 September 2003	Walsall (A)	1–2	Brown	6,395
4 October 2003	West Bromwich Albion (H)	0–2		8,883
14 October 2003	Reading (A)	1–2	King	13,011
18 October 2003	Wigan Athletic (A)	0–1		6,696
25 October 2003	Crystal Palace (H)	1–0	Perpetuini	8,889
1 November 2003	Ipswich Town (A)	4–3	Wallace, Sidibé, Shaw, Saunders	24,788
4 November 2003	Sunderland (H)	1–3	Shaw	9,066
8 November 2003	Crewe Alexandra (H)	2–0	Shaw, Spiller	6,923
15 November 2003	Wimbledon (H)	1–2	Nosworthy	9,041
22 November 2003	Coventry City (A)	2–2	T. Johnson (2)	13,432
29 November 2003	Stoke City (H)	3–1	Shaw, Hope, Sidibé	7,888
6 December 2003	Crewe Alexandra (A)	1–1	Perpetuini	6,271
13 December 2003	Preston North End (H)	0–1		7,602
26 December 2003	Watford (H)	1–0	Hills (pen.)	8,971
28 December 2003	Millwall (A)	2–1	Hessenthaler, James	12,084
10 January 2004	Sheffield United (H)	0–3		8,353
17 January 2004	Derby County (A)	1–2	T. Johnson	20,473
31 January 2004	Bradford City (H)	1–0	Agyemang	7,836
7 February 2004	Burnley (A)	0–1		10,400
21 February 2004	Reading (H)	0–1		8,600
25 February 2004	Nottingham Forest (A)	0–0		26,473
28 February 2004	Crystal Palace (A)	0–1		17,485
6 March 2004	Nottingham Forest (H)	2–1	Agyemang, Spiller	9,096
13 March 2004	Preston North End (A)	0–0		13,111
16 March 2004	Norwich City (A)	0–3		23,198
20 March 2004	Rotherham United (H)	2–0	Ashby, Sidibé	8,047
23 March 2004	Sunderland (A)	1–2	Agyemang	23,262
27 March 2004	West Ham United (A)	1–2	Spiller	34,551
3 April 2004	Cardiff City (H)	1–2	Hope	7,852
6 April 2004	Wigan Athletic (H)	0–3		7,410
10 April 2004	West Bromwich Albion (A)	0–1		24,524
12 April 2004	Walsall (H)	3–0	Agyemang (2), Spiller	8,244
17 April 2004	Ipswich Town (H)	1–2	Hills (pen.)	9,641
24 April 2004	Wimbledon (A)	2–1	Hessenthaler, Agyemang	5,049
1 May 2004	Coventry City (H)	2–5	Wales, Sidibé	10,388
9 May 2004	Stoke City (A)	0–0		19,240

=== Partial league table ===
Football League First Division final table, bottom positions
Pos	Team	Pld	W	D	L	GF	GA	GD	Pts	Promotion or relegation
20	Derby County	46	13	13	20	53	67	−14	52	
21	Gillingham	46	14	9	23	48	67	−19	51	
22	Walsall	46	13	12	21	45	65	−20	51	Relegated
23	Bradford City	46	10	6	30	38	69	−31	36	Relegated
24	Wimbledon	46	8	5	33	41	89	−48	29	Relegated

== Cup matches ==
=== FA Cup ===
As a First Division club, Gillingham entered the 2003–04 FA Cup at the third round stage in January; their opponents were Charlton Athletic, who were in fourth place in the FA Premier League. Bossu made only his second start in goal, as the terms of Vaesen's loan did not allow him to play in the game. Charlton took the lead after less than a minute when Cox scored an own goal, but Gillingham scored three goals before the half-time interval through Tommy Johnson, Mamady Sidibé, and Paul Smith. During a single Charlton attack in the second half, Bossu, whose overall performance was described by BBC Sport as "nervy", made what Barbara Douglas of The Times called "the sort of treble save [...] of which dreams are made" and, although Charlton scored a late goal, Gillingham held on for a 3–2 victory which the media deemed a shock result. Hessenthaler told the press "We deserved to win and made Charlton look poor" and Charlton's manager Alan Curbishley said "Gillingham deserved their win because they were hungrier, more aggressive and played better than us". Hessenthaler also told the media that Bossu burst into tears after being congratulated by more senior players in the dressing room. In the fourth round, Gillingham played away to fellow First Division team Burnley. Gillingham conceded two goals inside two minutes in the first half and never recovered, losing 3–1 and being eliminated from the competition.

==== FA Cup match details ====
Key

- In result column, Gillingham's score shown first
- H = Home match
- A = Away match
- pen. = Penalty kick
- o.g. = Own goal

Results
Date	Round	Opponents	Result	Goalscorers	Attendance
3 January 2004	Third	Charlton Athletic (H)	3–2	T. Johnson, Sidibé, Smith	10,894
24 January 2004	Fourth	Burnley (A)	1–3	Henderson	9,735

=== Football League Cup ===
As a First Division team, Gillingham entered the 2003–04 Football League Cup in the first round; their opponents were Cambridge United of the Third Division. Although Cambridge took the lead early in the match, Gillingham scored twice and held on for victory despite having Tommy Johnson sent off. In the second round they overcame fellow First Division team Stoke City, winning 2–0. The random draw for the third round paired them with FA Premier League team Bolton Wanderers. Gillingham conceded a goal in the first half after an error by Jason Brown and, although they played had a number of scoring chances of their own in the second half, they conceded a second goal and lost 2–0, ending their participation in the competition.

==== League Cup match details ====
Key

- In result column, Gillingham's score shown first
- H = Home match
- A = Away match
- pen. = Penalty kick
- o.g. = Own goal

Results
Date	Round	Opponents	Result	Goalscorers	Attendance
12 August 2003	First	Cambridge United (A)	2–1	Hills, Nosworthy	3,044
23 September 2003	Second	Stoke City (A)	2–0	Saunders, King	4,607
28 October 2003	Third	Bolton Wanderers (A)	0–2		5,258

== Players ==
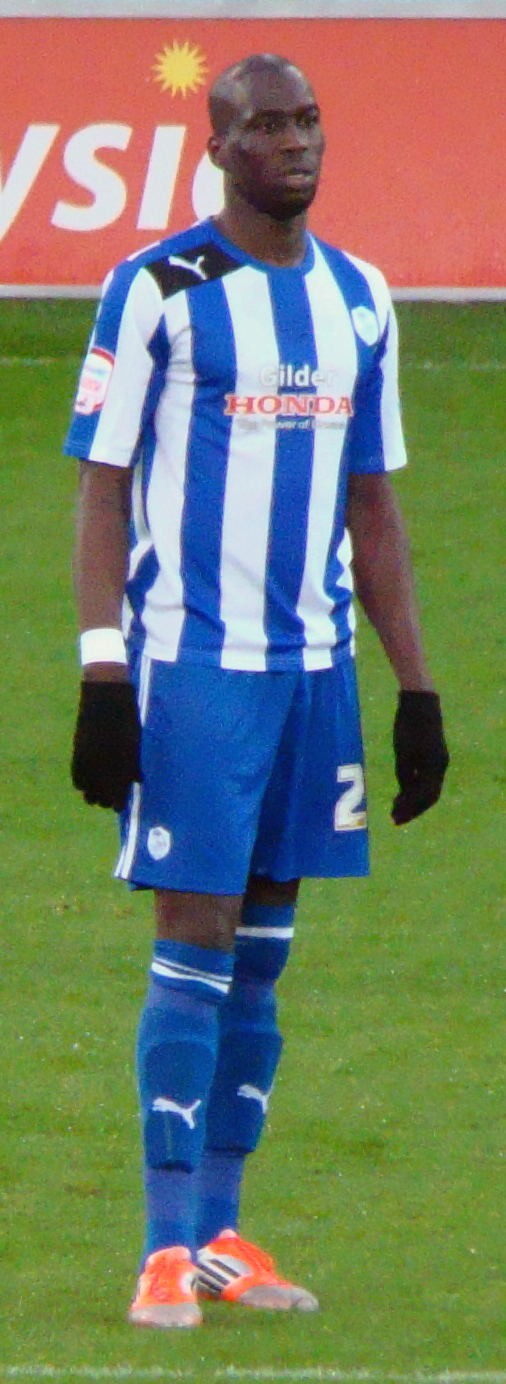
Mamady Sidibé (pictured in 2012) was one of four players tied as the team's top goalscorer.

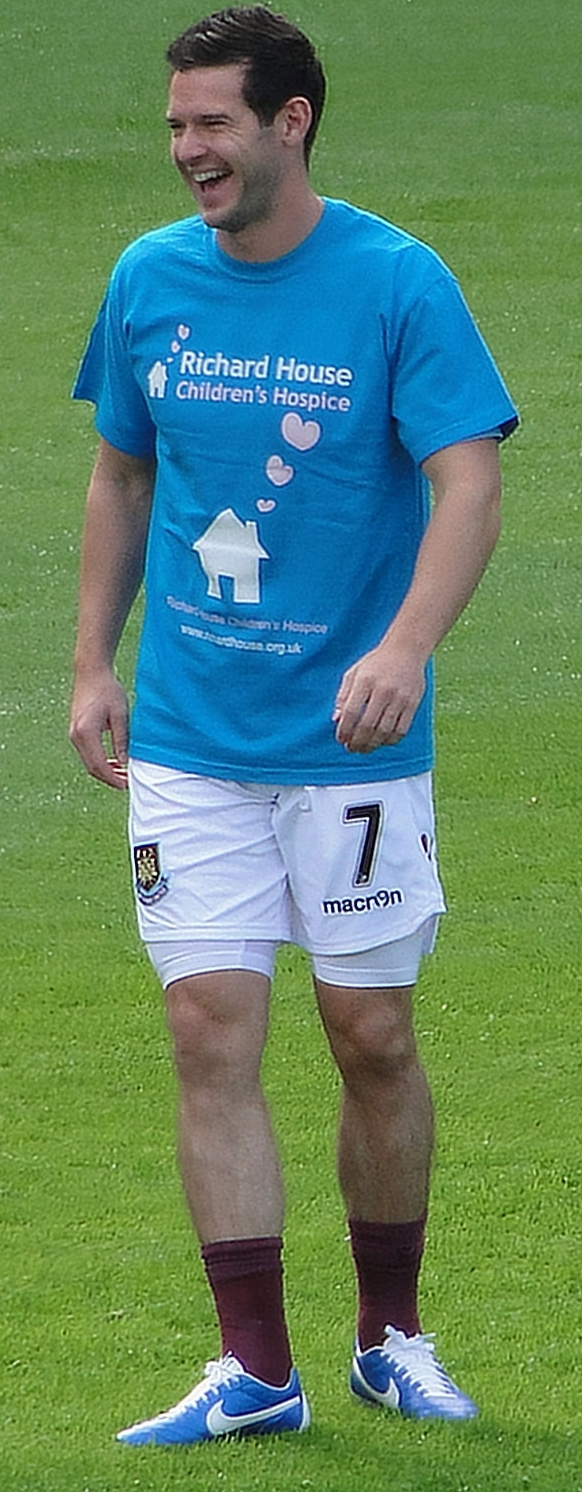
The future England international Matt Jarvis (pictured in 2012) made his professional debut at the age of 17.

During the season, 33 players made at least one appearance for Gillingham. Sidibé made the most, playing 45 times. Spiller and Hope also made more than 40 appearances. At the other end of the scale, four players featured in fewer than five games; Bartram was the only one who played just once. Twenty players scored at least one goal for the team during the season. Agyemang, Shaw, Spiller, and Mamady Sidibé were tied as the team's top goalscorer with six goals each; this was the lowest figure with which a player had finished a season as Gillingham's top scorer in the club's time in the Football League. Spiller won all available "Player of the Season" trophies at the club's end-of-season awards night.

Player statistics
No.	Player	Position	First Division		FA Cup		League Cup		Total	
No.	Player	Position	Apps	Goals	Apps	Goals	Apps	Goals	Apps	Goals
1	Vince Bartram	GK	1	0	0	0	0	0	1	0
1^{[a]}	Steve Banks	GK	13	0	0	0	0	0	13	0
2	Nyron Nosworthy	DF	27	2	2	0	3	1	32	3
3	John Hills	DF	29	2	2	0	3	1	34	3
4	Paul Smith	MF	33	0	2	1	2	0	37	1
5	Barry Ashby	DF	23	1	1	0	2	0	26	1
6	Ian Cox	DF	33	0	1	0	3	0	37	0
7	Nicky Southall	MF	35	0	1	0	2	0	38	0
8	Andy Hessenthaler	MF	36	2	1	0	2	0	39	2
9	Marlon King	FW	11	4	0	0	2	1	13	5
9^{[a]}	Darius Henderson	FW	4	0	2	1	0	0	6	1
10	Paul Shaw	FW	21	6	1	0	2	0	24	6
10^{[a]}	Patrick Agyemang	FW	20	6	0	0	0	0	20	6
11	Tommy Johnson	FW	15	3	2	1	2	0	19	4
12	Bertrand Bossu	GK	4	0	2	0	0	0	6	0
13	Jason Brown	GK	22	0	0	0	3	0	25	0
14	Leon Johnson	DF	20	0	1	0	0	0	21	0
15	Mark Saunders	MF	21	1	0	0	2	1	23	2
16	Richard Rose	DF	17	0	0	0	0	0	17	0
17	Andrew Crofts	MF	8	0	0	0	1	0	9	0
18	Chris Hope	DF	37	3	2	0	3	0	42	3
19	Rod Wallace	FW	14	1	0	0	1	0	15	1
20	Kevin James	MF	17	1	1	0	1	0	19	1
21	Wayne Brown	DF	4	1	0	0	0	0	4	1
21^{[a]}	Matt Jarvis	MF	10	0	1	0	0	0	11	0
22	Danny Spiller	MF	39	6	2	0	2	0	43	6
23	Trevor Benjamin	FW	4	1	0	0	0	0	4	1
25	Alan Pouton	MF	19	0	1	0	0	0	20	0
26	David Perpetuini	MF	20	2	0	0	2	0	22	2
29	Mamady Sidibé	FW	41	5	1	1	3	0	45	6
30	Nico Vaesen	GK	5	0	0	0	0	0	5	0
30^{[a]}	Lars Hirschfeld	GK	2	0	0	0	0	0	2	0
34	Gary Wales	FW	6	1	0	0	0	0	6	1

FW = Forward, MF = Midfielder, GK = Goalkeeper, DF = Defender

a. Player was allocated a squad number which had been worn earlier in the season by a player who had since left the club.

== Aftermath ==
Gillingham again struggled in the 2004–05 season in the renamed Football League Championship. Hessenthaler resigned as manager in November 2004 with the team near the bottom of the league table, and at the end of the season Gillingham were relegated, ending a five-season spell in the division. In a reversal of fortune from the conclusion of the 2003–04 season, Gillingham finished in 22nd place, level on points with 21st-placed Crewe Alexandra but with a goal difference which was one worse than Crewe's. As of 2024, Gillingham have never returned to the second tier of English football.
