= 2001–02 Gillingham F.C. season =

English football club season

Gillingham
2001–02 season
- Chairman: Paul Scally
- Manager: Andy Hessenthaler
- First Division: 12th
- FA Cup: Fifth round
- League Cup: Third round
- Top goalscorer: League: Marlon King (17); All: Marlon King (20)
- Highest home attendance: 10,477 (v Portsmouth, 26 December 2001)
- Lowest home attendance: 7,025 (v Grimsby Town, 5 March 2002)
Home colours	Away colours

During the 2001–02 English football season, Gillingham F.C. competed in the Football League First Division, the second tier of the English football league system. It was the 70th season in which Gillingham competed in the Football League and the 52nd since the club was voted back into the league in 1950. It was Gillingham's second consecutive season in the second tier of the English football league system, to which the club had gained promotion for the first time in 2000.

Gillingham began the season with a 5–0 victory over Preston North End, the first time the team had scored as many goals in a game for nearly two years, and were in third place in the league table after three games, but then lost four consecutive games, including one in which they conceded five goals for the first time since 1998. A further losing run in September and October left the team in 20th place out of 24 in the First Division league table but improved results in November and December meant that at the end of the calendar year they were in 12th place. Although the team's results in the second half of the season were inconsistent and they failed to win two consecutive games at any point between January and April, they were again in 12th place at the end of the campaign, an improvement of one position on their first season in the First Division.

Gillingham also competed in two knock-out tournaments. In the FA Cup, the team reached the fifth round but then lost to Arsenal of the Premier League. They were also eliminated from the Football League Cup by a Premier League team, losing to Southampton in the third round. Gillingham played 52 competitive matches, winning 22, drawing 10, and losing 20. Marlon King was the team's top goalscorer with 20 goals. Chris Hope and Paul Smith made the most appearances, both playing in every one of the team's matches. The highest attendance recorded at the club's home ground, Priestfield Stadium, was 10,477 for a match against Portsmouth on 26 December.

== Background and pre-season ==
The 2001–02 season was Gillingham's 70th season playing in the Football League and the 52nd since the club was elected back into the League in 1950 after being voted out in 1938. In the 1999–2000 season, Gillingham beat Wigan Athletic in the Second Division play-off final to reach the second tier of the English football league system for the first time in the club's history. In the team's first season at this level, Gillingham were seen by pundits as likely to struggle in the First Division and potentially finish 22nd or lower out of 24 teams in the league table, which would result in relegation back to the third tier, but instead the team finished in 13th place.

Andy Hessenthaler was the club's player-manager, a position he had held since 2000. Richard Hill was assistant manager and Wayne Jones held the position of first team coach. Paul Smith was the team captain. Gillingham made only one new signing ahead of the new season: David Perpetuini, a midfielder, joined from Watford just two days before the first game of the campaign, for a transfer fee reported as £100,000. Three players left, including Nicky Southall, who was transferred to Bolton Wanderers of the FA Premier League. In his column in the first matchday programme of the season, written before Perpetuini was signed, Hessenthaler apologised to supporters for being unable to strengthen the squad and said that the club was finding it increasingly hard to compete for new players with other First Division clubs due to the wages which Gillingham could afford to offer.

Gillingham's first-choice kit consisted of shirts, shorts, and socks all in the club's traditional blue; the second-choice kit, to be worn when there was a clash of colours with the opposition and Gillingham were the team required by the rules of the competition to change, was all-yellow. The club announced a new sponsorship deal prior to the season, its most lucrative to date, with the ferry operator SeaFrance, as a result of which the company's name was displayed on the players' shirts. The team's preparations for the new season began with a trip to Barbados, where they played a friendly match against the national team, followed by further friendlies in the United Kingdom. Previewing the season, BBC Sport acknowledged that Gillingham had exceeded expectations in their first campaign in the First Division but predicted that the team had "a tough season in prospect" and that they would "find it more difficult [...] as other teams become aware of their strengths". The Independent contended that Gillingham's squad was weaker than in the previous season and forecast that they would finish in 21st place.

== First Division ==
=== August–December ===
Gillingham's first match of the season was at their own ground, Priestfield Stadium, against Preston North End, who in the previous season had reached the final of the play-offs for promotion to the Premier League but been defeated. Marlon King, Gillingham's leading goalscorer in the previous season, was missing from the team as he had been given a two-match ban as punishment for offensive comments made to the referee during a game at the end of the previous season. Marcus Browning scored twice, his first goals for Gillingham after more than 40 games for the club, in a 5–0 victory for the home team. It was the first time Gillingham had scored more than four goals in a game since October 1999. Following a goalless draw away to Sheffield United, Gillingham won 3–0 at home to Barnsley, King scoring twice in his first start of the season. The result meant that Gillingham were third in the league table and were the only First Division team yet to concede a league goal. After this strong start to the First Division season, Gillingham lost their next four league games. The run began with a 1–0 defeat to West Bromwich Albion which was followed by a 2–1 loss to Portsmouth. On 14 September, the team lost 5–1 away to Bradford City, the first time Gillingham had conceded as many goals in a league game since December 1998. A 3–2 defeat at home to Wolverhampton Wanderers four days later, in which Gillingham were reduced to ten men when Barry Ashby was sent off, meant that Gillingham had slipped to 17th place in the table. The team's losing run in the league ended on 22 September with a 2–1 victory at home to Rotherham United, and they followed this with an identical result away to Grimsby Town; Chris Hope and King scored Gillingham's goals in both games. The wins took Gillingham back up to 11th place in the table, but they then again lost four consecutive league games.

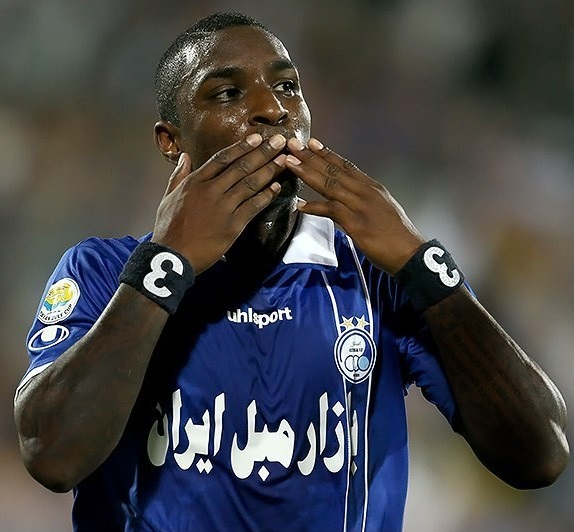
Jlloyd Samuel (pictured in 2013) spent a month on loan to Gillingham from Aston Villa.

The losing run began with a 2–1 defeat at home to Coventry City, after which Gillingham lost again at Priestfield to Norwich City on 13 October. In the latter game Simon Osborn, a midfielder newly signed from Port Vale on a free transfer, made his debut and Robert Taylor made the first appearance of a second spell at Gillingham. Taylor, a forward who had scored 39 goals in 70 games for Gillingham between 1998 and 1999, re-joined the club on a three-month loan from fellow First Division club Wolverhampton Wanderers. The team's losing streak continued with a 3–1 defeat away to Wimbledon on 20 October and a 2–1 loss away to Birmingham City three days later which left Gillingham in 20th place in the league table. Jlloyd Samuel, a young defender, joined Gillingham on loan from Aston Villa of the Premier League and went straight into the starting line-up for the home game with Walsall on 27 October, replacing the injured Adrian Pennock. Goals from Perpetuini and Guy Ipoua gave Gillingham a 2–0 victory, their first win for over a month. In their final match of October, Gillingham took a 2–0 lead over Burnley inside the first 15 minutes but then conceded two goals and the match ended in a draw. Gillingham's first match of November was away to Manchester City. Shaun Goater scored a hat-trick for the home team in a 4–1 victory; BBC Sport described City's performance as "90 minutes of utter domination" and said that they "found little opposition from Gillingham". The result meant that Gillingham were again in 20th place in the league table, just one point above the relegation positions.

The team's next two games ended in goalless draws against Crewe Alexandra and Watford. Having failed to score in over three hours of football, Gillingham scored three times in the first half against Crystal Palace on 21 November and secured a 3–0 victory. Steve Kember, Palace's caretaker manager, said that Gillingham could potentially have scored more goals and acknowledged that his team had failed to match Gillingham's level of physicality during the game. On 24 November, Gillingham won 2–1 away to Millwall, coming from behind with goals in the final ten minutes from Ipoua and King. Gillingham's players wore Millwall's second-choice shirts for the match as their kit manager had mistakenly packed the team's first-choice shirts, which were the same colour as Millwall's. Gillingham extended their winning run to three games with a 2–0 victory away to Stockport County on 27 November with goals from Iffy Onoura and King. Samuel made his final appearance for the club three days later in a 1–1 draw at home to Birmingham City; Shaw missed a late chance to score a winner but BBC Sport said that "a draw was the fairest result". Gillingham began December with a 2–2 draw away to Nottingham Forest with two goals from Shaw and extended their unbeaten run to eight games by beating Sheffield Wednesday 2–1 at Priestfield on 15 December, with all the goals being scored in the first 30 minutes. A week later, however, the run ended as Gillingham lost 4–1 to Barnsley, who had been in 22nd place in the table going into the game. Following a 2–0 victory at home to Portsmouth on 26 December which drew an attendance of 10,477, Priestfield's largest of the season, Gillingham's final game of 2001 was three days later against West Bromwich Albion, also at home. The away team were reduced to ten players after just four minutes when Tony Butler, a former Gillingham player, was sent off. Despite the numerical disparity, the score was level until Smith scored in stoppage time at the end of the game to give Gillingham a 2–1 win. It was the final match of Taylor's loan spell; in contrast to his first stint with the club he had failed to score a single goal. The result meant that Gillingham finished the calendar year in 12th place in the league table.

=== January–April ===
Gillingham were originally scheduled to play away to Crystal Palace on 1 January but the game was postponed as the pitch was frozen, and so their first league match of 2002 did not occur until 12 January when they lost 1–0 at home to Sheffield United. The match against Crystal Palace was re-arranged for 16 January and Gillingham lost 3–1, but despite the two defeats they only fell to 13th in the league table. Three days later, they secured their first league victory of 2002 with a 2–0 win away to Preston North End. Against Stockport County in the final match of January, Gillingham took the lead three times only for their opponents to equalise each time. Stockport were reduced to ten men when Andy Dibble, their goalkeeper, was sent off but held on for a draw. Gillingham's unbeaten run continued with a 2–1 win away to Coventry City on 2 February with goals from Onoura and King; the veteran Onoura was quoted in the matchday programme for the next league game as describing the goal he scored from a distance of nearly 40 yards (36.6 m) as the best of his career. Hessenthaler came on as a late substitute, his first appearance for the team since November. The next game resulted in a 0–0 draw against another mid-table team, Wimbledon. Gillingham's subsequent three league games all resulted in defeat, beginning with a 4–0 loss at home to Bradford City; BBC Sport noted that "Bradford were always in command and never looked in any danger". Three days later, Gillingham played away to Rotherham United and conceded three goals in the first 55 minutes; Onoura and King scored late goals for Gillingham but the match ended in a 3–2 victory for Rotherham. The team's third consecutive defeat was to Wolverhampton Wanderers on 2 March, which left Gillingham 15th in the league table. Rick Broadbent of The Times wrote that Gillingham were "no threat" to their opponents, who Hessenthaler predicted would go on to win the championship of the division.

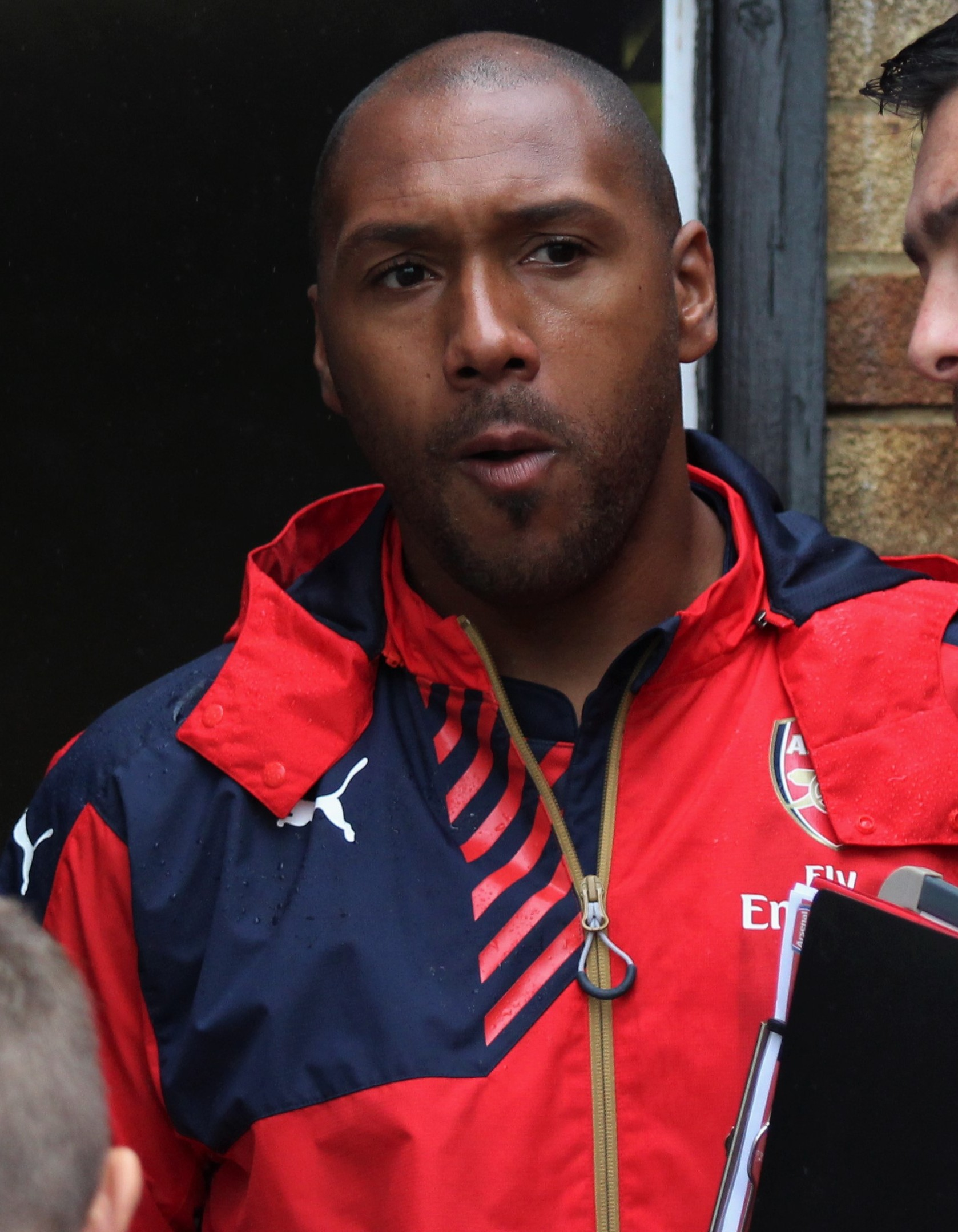
Jason Brown (pictured in 2015) made his debut for the club in March and retained the position of goalkeeper for the remainder of the season.

On 5 March, 19-year-old Jason Brown made his debut for the club, replacing Vince Bartram as starting goalkeeper. Brown had joined the club a year earlier but had never previously been able to displace Bartram from the team; Hessenthaler named him in the starting line-up for the match against Grimsby Town after Bartram had been criticised for his recent performances. Although Brown conceded an early goal, Gillingham won 2–1 with goals from Paul Shaw and Ipoua; Hessenthaler described Brown's performance as "superb", and he retained the starting goalkeeper position for the remainder of the season. Four days later, the team drew 0–0 with Sheffield Wednesday, who were 20th in the league table going into the game; Richard Copeman of The Sunday Telegraph wrote that Brown "was in superb form". A week later, Gillingham beat Nottingham Forest 3–1; the scores were level with ten minutes remaining but both King and Browning scored in the closing stages. On 19 March, Onoura scored an early goal against Norwich City, and Brown saved a penalty kick to ensure that Gillingham were in the lead at half-time, but Norwich, who had a slim chance of making the promotion play-offs, dominated the second half and scored twice to secure victory. The result meant that, with six games remaining and therefore a maximum of 18 more points available, Gillingham were 10 points below the play-off places and 14 points above the relegation positions.

A goal from King, his 19th of the season, gave Gillingham a 1–0 victory over Millwall, who were challenging for promotion, on 24 March. Hessenthaler described the goal as a "bit of quality" and told the press "I thought we edged it, and we've gone past the 55 points we got last year – a fantastic achievement on fifty grand", referring to, but apparently misquoting, the small amount the club had spent in transfer fees to sign new players since the previous season. Gillingham's next two games were on consecutive days against teams who were both in danger of relegation. On 30 March, they played away to Walsall, who were in 23rd place in the league table. The home team scored in the first half and appeared to be heading for victory until Gillingham's Mark Saunders scored in the 87th minute to secure his team a draw. The next day, Gillingham beat 21st-placed Crewe Alexandra, King scoring the only goal from a penalty kick. Crewe were awarded a penalty kick of their own in the second half, but Shaun Smith kicked the ball so high that it flew not only over the goal but right out of the stadium, hitting a house behind the Town End stand. Gillingham's short unbeaten run ended with a 2–1 defeat away to play-off contenders Burnley on 6 April. A week later, Gillingham lost 3–1 at home to Manchester City, who had already clinched the championship of the division. The team's final match of the season was away to Watford. At half-time the score was 1–1; Watford took the lead early in the second half but goals from Shaw and Onoura gave Gillingham a 3–2 victory; in addition to scoring the winning goal, Onoura provided the assist for both of his team's other goals. Despite having failed to win two consecutive league games at any point in the second half of the season, Gillingham finished the campaign 12th in the First Division, the same position they had held at the start of 2002 and an improvement of one place on their first season in the First Division.

=== League match details ===
Key

- In result column, Gillingham's score shown first
- H = Home match
- A = Away match
- pen. = Penalty kick
- o.g. = Own goal

Results
Date	Opponents	Result	Goalscorers	Attendance
11 August 2001	Preston North End (H)	5–0	Browning (2), Ashby, Onuora, Gooden	9,412
18 August 2001	Sheffield United (A)	0–0		16,998
25 August 2001	Barnsley (H)	3–0	Onuora, King (2)	8,292
27 August 2001	West Bromwich Albion (A)	0–1		18,180
8 September 2001	Portsmouth (A)	1–2	Onuora	17,224
14 September 2001	Bradford City (A)	1–5	King	14,101
18 September 2001	Wolverhampton Wanderers (H)	2–3	Ipoua, King (pen.)	8,966
22 September 2001	Rotherham United (H)	2–1	King, Hope	7,688
25 September 2001	Grimsby Town (A)	2–1	Hope, King	4,859
29 September 2001	Coventry City (H)	1–2	Shaw	9,435
13 October 2001	Norwich City (H)	0–2		9,166
20 October 2001	Wimbledon (A)	1–3	Butters	8,042
23 October 2001	Birmingham City (A)	1–2	Ipoua	27,101
27 October 2001	Walsall (H)	2–0	Perpetuini, Ipoua	7,548
30 October 2001	Burnley (H)	2–2	Osborn, Ipoua	8,067
3 November 2001	Manchester City (A)	1–4	King	33,067
10 November 2001	Crewe Alexandra (A)	0–0		5,419
18 November 2001	Watford (H)	0–0		8,733
21 November 2001	Crystal Palace (H)	3–0	Ipoua (2), Onuora	9,396
24 November 2001	Millwall (A)	2–1	Ipoua, King	15,214
27 November 2001	Stockport County (A)	2–0	Onuora, King	4,854
30 November 2001	Birmingham City (H)	1–1	Purse (o.g.)	8,575
8 December 2001	Nottingham Forest (A)	2–2	Shaw (2)	18,303
15 December 2001	Sheffield Wednesday (H)	2–1	Shaw, Osborn	8,586
22 December 2001	Barnsley (A)	1–4	Morgan (o.g.)	11,965
26 December 2001	Portsmouth (H)	2–0	King, Shaw	10,477
29 December 2001	West Bromwich Albion (H)	2–1	Hope, Smith	9,912
12 January 2002	Sheffield United (H)	0–1		8,814
16 January 2002	Crystal Palace (A)	1–3	Onuora	17,646
19 January 2002	Preston North End (A)	2–0	Osborn, Smith	13,289
29 January 2002	Stockport County (H)	3–3	Ashby, Osborn, King (pen.)	7,217
2 February 2002	Coventry City (A)	2–1	Onuora, King	14,337
9 February 2002	Wimbledon (H)	0–0		8,494
23 February 2002	Bradford City (H)	0–4		7,789
26 February 2002	Rotherham United (A)	2–3	Onuora, King	6,005
2 March 2002	Wolverhampton Wanderers (A)	0–2		25,908
5 March 2002	Grimsby Town (H)	2–1	Shaw, Ipoua	7,025
9 March 2002	Sheffield Wednesday (A)	0–0		20,361
16 March 2002	Nottingham Forest (H)	3–1	King (2), Browning	8,928
19 March 2002	Norwich City (A)	1–2	Onuora	16,479
24 March 2002	Millwall (H)	1–0	King	8,082
30 March 2002	Walsall (A)	1–1	Saunders	6,190
1 April 2002	Crewe Alexandra (H)	1–0	King (pen.)	7,748
6 April 2002	Burnley (A)	0–2		16,236
13 April 2002	Manchester City (H)	1–3	Onuora	9,494
21 April 2002	Watford (A)	3–2	Hope, Shaw, Onuora	15,674

=== Partial league table ===
Football League First Division final table, positions 10–14
Pos	Team	Pld	W	D	L	GF	GA	GD	Pts
10	Crystal Palace	46	20	6	20	70	62	+8	66
11	Coventry City	46	20	6	20	59	53	+6	66
12	Gillingham	46	18	10	18	64	67	−3	64
13	Sheffield United	46	15	15	16	53	54	−1	60
14	Watford	46	16	11	19	62	56	+6	59

== Cup matches ==
=== FA Cup ===
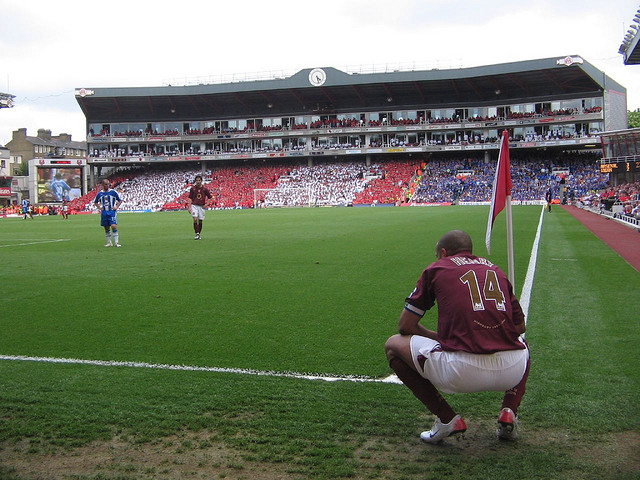
Gillingham were eliminated from the FA Cup at Arsenal Stadium (pictured in 2006).

As a First Division team, Gillingham entered the 2001–02 FA Cup in the third round; in the random draw they were allocated an away game with fellow First Division team Wolverhampton Wanderers. A goal from Shaw early in the second half secured a 1–0 win and only a series of saves by home goalkeeper Michael Oakes kept Gillingham from winning by a larger margin. In the fourth round Gillingham played Bristol Rovers of the Third Division. BBC Sport stated that Gillingham "dominated from start to finish" against their lower-league opponents, but despite this they won only narrowly, the only goal coming when Rovers' Scott Jones deflected the ball past his own goalkeeper to score an own goal.

Gillingham's opponents in the fifth round were Arsenal, who in the previous season had been beaten finalists in the FA Cup and finished second in the Premier League. With a higher-priority UEFA Champions League match upcoming, Arsenal made a number of changes to their team for the game. Two of their key players, leading goalscorer Thierry Henry and Robert Pires, who would go on to win the Football Writers' Association Footballer of the Year award for his performances during the season, were named only as substitutes. Twice Arsenal took the lead only for Gillingham to equalise, the second time with a lobbed goal from Ty Gooden which BBC Sport described as "sensational" and "stunning". Both Henry and Pires were then brought on, which Clive White of The Sunday Telegraph said was done "out of respect for the opposition", after which Arsenal scored three more goals to secure a 5–2 victory which BBC Sport said made the match look more one-sided than it had actually been. Arsenal would go on to win both the FA Cup and the Premier League at the end of the season.

==== FA Cup match details ====
Key

- In result column, Gillingham's score shown first
- H = Home match
- A = Away match
- pen. = Penalty kick
- o.g. = Own goal

Results
Date	Round	Opponents	Result	Goalscorers	Attendance
5 January 2002	Third	Wolverhampton Wanderers (A)	1–0	Shaw	15,271
5 February 2002	Fourth	Bristol Rovers (H)	1–0	Jones (o.g.)	9,772
16 February 2002	Fifth	Arsenal (A)	2–5	King, Gooden	38,003

=== Football League Cup ===
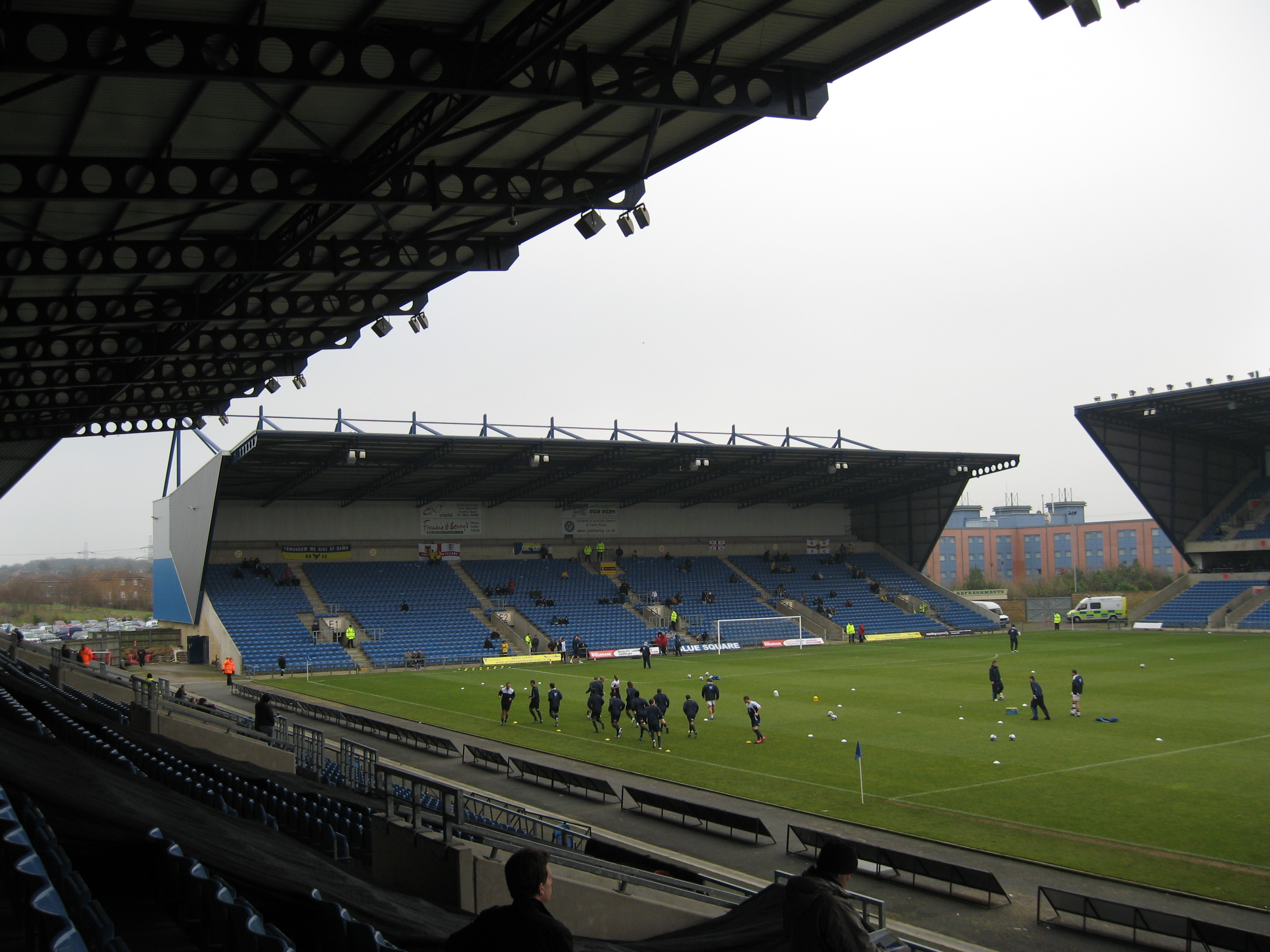
Gillingham won at the Kassam Stadium (pictured in 2010), home of Oxford United, with a goal in the final minute of extra time.

As a First Division team, Gillingham entered the 2001–02 Football League Cup in the first round; their opponents were Oxford United of the Third Division. Gillingham conceded a goal in the first half and were losing until eight minutes from the end of the game when King scored from a penalty kick. The score was 1–1 at the end of the regulation 90 minutes and so, under the rules of the competition, 30 minutes of extra time were played. In the final minute of the extra period, Onoura scored to give Gillingham a 2–1 victory. Gillingham's opponents in the second round were fellow First Division team Millwall. King gave Gillingham a lead inside the first five minutes, but Millwall equalised and it appeared that extra time would be required again until Gillingham's Ipoua scored a winning goal in the 90th minute.

In the third round, Gillingham played at home to Southampton of the Premier League. The away team took the lead early on with a goal from a penalty kick; two further appeals for penalties, one from each team, were turned down by the referee before half-time. Southampton had a number of further goalscoring chances in the second half but did not score again until the 83rd minute when they made it 2–0, which proved to be the final result, meaning that Gillingham were eliminated from the competition.

==== League Cup match details ====
Key

- In result column, Gillingham's score shown first
- H = Home match
- A = Away match
- pen. = Penalty kick
- o.g. = Own goal

Results
Date	Round	Opponents	Result	Goalscorers	Attendance
21 August 2001	First	Oxford United (A)	2–1 (a.e.t.)	King (pen), Onuora	5,886
11 September 2001	Second	Millwall (H)	2–1	King, Ipoua	7,511
9 October 2001	Third	Southampton (H)	0–2		7,948

== Players ==
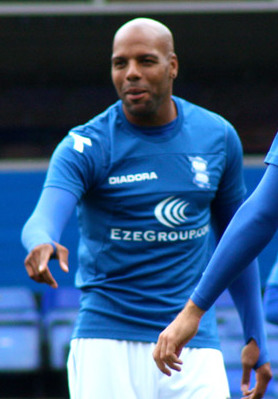
Marlon King (pictured in 2012) was the team's top goalscorer.

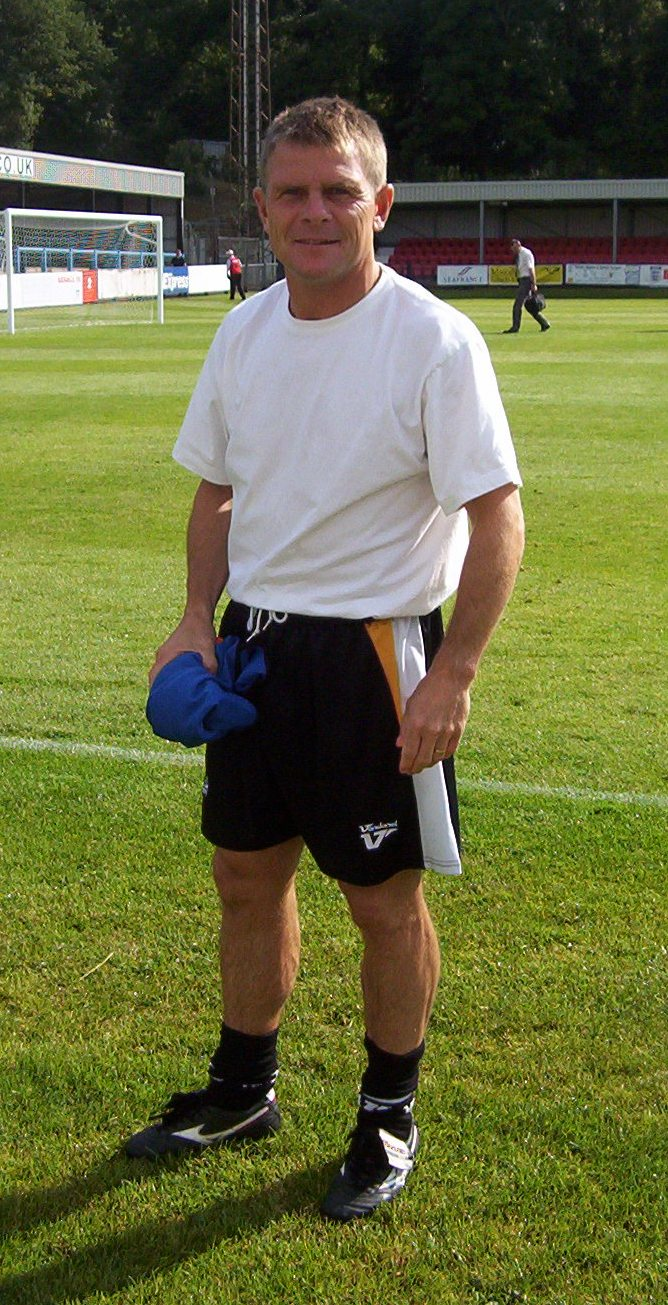
Andy Hessenthaler (pictured in 2009), the team's player-manager, made 20 appearances during the season.

During the season, 25 players made at least one appearance for Gillingham. Hope and Smith made the most, both playing in every one of the team's 52 games; it was the second consecutive season in which Hope had been ever-present, taking his run of consecutive appearances for the team since he joined Gillingham in 2000 past 100. Smith won the club's Player of the Season award, organised by the Gillingham Independent Supporters' Club, making him the first player to win the award three times. Browning, King, Ipoua and Shaw all made more than 40 appearances. Only two players appeared fewer than five times; the teenager Danny Spiller was the only one who played in just one game.

Of the 13 players who scored at least one goal for the team, King was the highest scorer with 17 goals in league games and 20 in total in all competitions. Onoura scored 11 goals in the league and 12 in total; no other player reached double figures.

Player statistics
No.	Player	Position	First Division		FA Cup		League Cup		Total	
No.	Player	Position	Apps.	Goals	Apps.	Goals	Apps.	Goals	Apps.	Goals
1	Vince Bartram	GK	36	0	3	0	3	0	42	0
2	Mark Patterson	DF	20	0	2	0	3	0	25	0
3	Roland Edge	DF	14	0	0	0	2	0	16	0
4	Paul Smith	MF	46	2	3	0	3	0	52	2
5	Barry Ashby	DF	28	2	3	0	2	0	33	2
6	Guy Butters	DF	23	1	0	0	1	0	24	1
7	Nyron Nosworthy	DF	29	0	2	0	0	0	31	0
8	Andy Hessenthaler	MF	17	0	1	0	2	0	20	0
9	Marlon King	FW	42	17	3	1	3	2	48	20
10	Guy Ipoua	FW	40	8	3	0	3	1	46	9
11	Ty Gooden	MF	25	1	3	1	2	0	30	2
12	Paul Shaw	FW	37	7	3	1	3	0	43	8
13	Jason Brown	GK	10	0	0	0	0	0	10	0
14	Marcus Browning	MF	42	3	3	0	3	0	48	3
15	Mark Saunders	MF	19	1	0	0	1	0	20	1
16	Richard Rose	DF	3	0	0	0	0	0	3	0
17	Adrian Pennock	DF	10	0	0	0	3	0	13	0
18	Chris Hope	DF	46	4	3	0	3	0	52	4
19	Iffy Onuora	FW	33	11	3	0	3	1	39	12
20	Kevin James	MF	10	0	0	0	0	0	10	0
21	Simon Osborn	MF	28	4	3	0	0	0	31	4
22	Danny Spiller	MF	1	0	0	0	0	0	1	0
26	David Perpetuini	MF	34	1	3	0	2	0	39	1
27	Robert Taylor	FW	11	0	0	0	0	0	11	0
28	Jlloyd Samuel	DF	8	0	0	0	0	0	8	0

FW = Forward, MF = Midfielder, GK = Goalkeeper, DF = Defender

== Aftermath ==
Less than three weeks after the season ended, King was sentenced to 18 months in prison after being caught driving a stolen car the previous year. He would ultimately miss only the first two months of the 2002–03 season after the length of his sentence was reduced following an appeal. Gillingham once again improved their final league position, ending the 2002–03 campaign in 11th place in the First Division, but in terms of league standings, this would prove to be the peak of the club's time in the second tier of English football. In the 2003–04 season, they finished 21st, level on points with 22nd-placed Walsall, and avoided relegation only by virtue of a superior goal difference. Hessenthaler resigned as manager in November 2004 as the team again struggled near the foot of the renamed Football League Championship, and at the end of the 2004–05 season Gillingham were relegated, ending a five-season spell in the division. As of 2024, the club has never returned to the second tier of English football.
