= Awuah =

Awuah is an Akan surname. Notable people with the surname include:

- Emmanuel Awuah Baffour (born 1989), Ghanaian footballer
- Esi Awuah, Ghanaian academician
- Ignatius Baffour-Awuah (born 1966), Ghanaian politician
- Jones Awuah (born 1983), Ghanaian footballer
- Joseph Awuah-Darko (born 1996), British social entrepreneur, artist and philanthropist
- Kwame Awuah (born 1995), Canadian soccer player
- Patrick Awuah Jr. (born 1965), Ghanaian educator
- Kristal Awuah, British athlete
