= Lewis Killeen =

English footballer

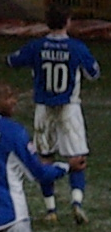

Personal information
- Full name: Lewis Keith Killeen
- Date of birth: 23 September 1982 (age 44)
- Place of birth: Peterborough, England
- Position: Striker

Senior career*
Years	Team	Apps	(Gls)
2001–2003	Sheffield United	1	(0)
2002–2003	→ Halifax Town (loan)	13	(4)
2003–2008	Halifax Town	188	(34)
2008–2010	Crawley Town	58	(7)
2010–	Droylsden	73	(4)
- * Club domestic league appearances and goals as of 13:03, 28 August 2012 (UTC)

Lewis Keith Killeen (born 23 September 1982 in Peterborough) is a retired ex English professional footballer who has over 400 career appearances to his name at clubs including Sheffield United, Halifax Town and Crawley Town.

== Career ==
Killeen signed for Sheffield United as a trainee on 1 August 1999. He made his debut against Walsall in front of a crowd of 20,000 in April 2002. In November 2002 he was loaned out to Halifax Town for three months where he scored 6 goals in 14 appearances. After a successful loan period he was granted a release from Bramall Lane and signed for Halifax Town in June 2003 where he remained for five years amounting over 200 appearances and scoring 44 times. He will be remembered for scoring a 25-yard screamer in the 3-2 extra time play off final loss to Hereford in 2006.

In May 2008, it was announced that Killeen had signed for Conference National outfit Crawley Town. The player remained at Crawley Town for two seasons, turning down new deal in June 2010 to concentrate on completing his degree to become a physiotherapist. During his stay at The Broadfield Stadium, Killeen appeared in fifty-eight league games, scoring seven times in the process. In July 2010, it was announced that he had signed for Droylsden in the Conference North where he remained for three years amounting over 150 appearances. He had a brief spell at Ashton United, however has not played competitively since gaining a 1st class honours degree in physiotherapy.
