= Guy Ipoua =

Cameroonian footballer

Personal information
- Full name: Guy Ipoua
- Date of birth: 14 January 1976 (age 50)
- Place of birth: Douala, Cameroon
- Height: 6 ft 1 in (1.85 m)
- Position: Striker

Senior career*
Years	Team	Apps	(Gls)
1992–199?	Nancy	0	(0)
199?–199?	Torino	0	(0)
199?–199?	Atlético Madrid	0	(0)
199?–199?	Novelda	?	(?)
199?–199?	Sevilla	?	(?)
199?–1998	Alicante	?	(?)
1998–1999	Bristol Rovers	24	(3)
1999–2001	Scunthorpe United	65	(23)
2001–2003	Gillingham	82	(13)
2003–2004	Livingston	1	(0)
2004–2005	Doncaster Rovers	9	(0)
2004	→ Mansfield Town (loan)	5	(0)
2005	→ Lincoln City (loan)	6	(0)
2005–2006	Hereford United	19	(7)
2006	Forest Green Rovers	7	(0)
2007	Oryx Douala		
- * Club domestic league appearances and goals as of 15 March 2007

Guy Ipoua (born 14 January 1976) is a former Cameroonian footballer who played as a striker. He previously played for a string of British and Continental clubs. His elder brother, Samuel, represented Cameroon at the 1998 World Cup.

== Career ==
Born in Douala, Cameroon, Ipoua moved to Strasbourg, France, at the age of four. His early football career is unclear but he joined Nancy in 1992, and had a spell at Torino, where his brother was also on loan from Inter Milan, for six months. He was also on the books of Atlético Madrid, at the time the reigning La Liga champions and cup holders. He has also played for Sevilla, Alicante, Écija and Novelda.

In the summer of 1998, he spent three weeks on trial at Crystal Palace, but failed to secure a contract. He spent a season at Bristol Rovers, where he scored three goals in 24 league games, before being released the following summer. A trial at Torquay United followed in July 1999, but he again failed to secure a contract. He subsequently went for trials at a number of clubs in England and Scotland, including Wycombe Wanderers and St Johnstone.

He eventually signed for Scunthorpe United in August 1999, scoring on his debut against Bournemouth, and again against Cardiff City two days later. This earned him a contract with the club, and he enjoyed almost two successful seasons with Scunthorpe, notably scoring seven times in the space of a week. Amid interest from Sheffield Wednesday and Bolton Wanderers and with a new contract offer at Scunthorpe United, he was sold to Gillingham for just £25,000, a low fee because he could have left for free a couple months later under the Bosman ruling. The transfer agreement included a further £10,000 fee if Ipoua was to play ten games in the following season and a ten percent sell-on clause on any future transfer.

He was mainly used as a substitute for Gillingham up to the end of the season. Ipoua was released by Gillingham at the end of the 2002–03 season.

After rejecting a possible move to the United States with FC Dallas, he joined Scottish side Livingston in July 2003, having missed a substantial amount of pre-season training. However, he was to make just two appearances for the club, both as a substitute.

In July 2004, Ipoua signed for Doncaster Rovers, but again failed to establish himself in the first team. He joined Mansfield Town on loan in October 2004 and Lincoln City on loan in February 2005 before being released at the end of the season.

In August 2005, he joined Hereford United and scored a goal in each of his first three league games. His season was disrupted by injury and in the latter stages he was used as only as a substitute. However, he shone in Hereford's successful play-off campaign, scoring an extra-time winner in the semi-final against Morecambe. In the final itself, he was brought on in the second half with Hereford 2–1 down, and soon made an impact. He skillfully controlled a flick on by Andy Ferrell, played the ball out to Simon Travis and then powerfully headed the return cross into the net to equalise. In the dying minutes of extra time, he also did well to run the clock down by keeping the ball in the corner while fending off the attentions of several opposing players, and earning Hereford three consecutive corners. However, Ipoua was one of several Hereford players released shortly after the final.

In August 2006, he signed for Forest Green Rovers after impressing on trial in pre season for the Gloucestershire club. Ipoua made his Forest Green debut on 26 August 2006 in a 1–0 defeat against Gravesend & Northfleet. After making just seven appearances, five of these from the bench, Ipoua was released in September 2006 and signed for Oryx Douala in his native Cameroon.

== Post-playing career ==
Ipoua joined the scouting team at Newcastle United in 2019.

== Career statistics ==
As of match played 23 September 2006

Appearances and goals by club, season and competition
Club	Season	League			National cup (Note: Includes FA Cup, Scottish Cup)		League cup (Note: Includes League Cup, Scottish League Cup)		Other		Total	
Club	Season	Division	Apps	Goals	Apps	Goals	Apps	Goals	Apps	Goals	Apps	Goals
Bristol Rovers	1998–99	Division Two	24	3	4	0	2	0	1 (Note: Appearance(s) in Football League Trophy)	0	31	3
Scunthorpe United	1999–2000	Division Two	40	9	1	0	0	0	1	0	42	9
Scunthorpe United	2000–01	Division Three	25	14	4	4	0	0	1	0	30	18
Scunthorpe United	Total		65	23	5	4	0	0	2	0	72	27
Gilliingham	2000–01	Division One	9	0	0	0	0	0	0	0	9	0
Gilliingham	2001–02	Division One	40	8	3	0	3	1	0	0	46	9
Gilliingham	2002–03	Division One	33	4	3	2	3	1	0	0	39	7
Gilliingham	Total		82	12	6	2	6	2	0	0	94	16
Livingston	2003–04	Scottish Premier League	1	0	0	0	1	0	0	0	2	0
Doncaster Rovers	2004–05	League One	9	0	1	0	1	0	0	0	11	0
Mansfield Town (loan)	2004–05	League Two	5	0	0	0	0	0	0	0	5	0
Lincoln City (loan)	2004–05	League Two	6	0	0	0	0	0	0	0	6	0
Hereford	2005–06	Conference National	19	7	2	0	—		7 (Note: Four appearances in Football League Trophy; three appearances and two goals in Conference National play-offs)	2	28	9
Forest Green Rovers	2006–07	Conference National	7	0	0	0	—		0	0	7	0
Career total			218	45	18	6	10	2	10	2	256	55
