= Jones Awuah =

Ghanaian association football player

Personal information
- Full name: Jones Awuah
- Date of birth: 7 October 1983 (age 43)
- Place of birth: Ghana
- Height: 6 ft 0 in (1.83 m)
- Position: Forward

Youth career
- ?–2002: Gillingham

Senior career*
Years	Team	Apps	(Gls)
2002–2005	Gillingham	4	(0)
2002	→ Sittingbourne (loan)	1	
2004	→ Dover Athletic (loan)		
2004–2005	→ Worthing (loan)		
- → Woking (loan)
2005–	Aveley		
2005–2006	Bromley		
2006	Sutton United		
2006–	Beckenham Town		
2007–2008	Dorchester Town		
2008	Fisher Athletic		
- Maidenhead United
2008–2009	Bognor Regis Town		
2009	Winchester City		
2009	Weymouth		
2009–2010	Carshalton Athletic		
2010–2011	Ashford Town	42	(23)
2011–2012	Burgess Hill Town		
- * Club domestic league appearances and goals ‡ National team caps and goals as of 21:23, 9 April 2012 (UTC)

Jones Awuah (born 7 October 1983) is a Ghanaian association football player.

== Career ==
=== Professional ===
He began his career with Gillingham and made his professional debut in the Football League First Division against Nottingham Forest on 18 September 2002. Whilst at Gillingham he had loan periods at Sittingbourne in October 2002, Dover Athletic in February 2004, Worthing and Woking. He was released in the summer of 2005 by Gillingham.

=== Semi-professional ===
He then dropped into non-league football, playing for Aveley and Bromley in 2005, Sutton United where he moved in February 2006, and Beckenham Town in late 2006.

He joined Dorchester Town on a short-term deal in August 2007, making his first team debut on 14 August against Havant & Waterlooville. He moved to Fisher Athletic in February 2008 and Bognor Regis Town in December 2008. A move to Winchester City followed in March 2009, and then quickly onto Weymouth.

He then joined Carshalton Athletic for a time before being released, next joining Middlesex side Ashford Town in February 2010. At the start of the 2011–12 season he joined Burgess Hill Town and was released by the club at the end of January 2012.
