= Kevin James (English footballer) =

English footballer

Personal information
- Full name: Kevin Ernest James
- Date of birth: 3 January 1980 (age 46)
- Place of birth: Southwark, England
- Height: 5 ft 9 in (1.75 m)
- Positions: Midfielder; forward

Youth career
- ?–1998: Charlton Athletic

Senior career*
Years	Team	Apps	(Gls)
1998–2000	Charlton Athletic	0	(0)
2000–2004	Gillingham	48	(4)
2004–2007	Nottingham Forest	7	(0)
2004–2005	→ Boston United (loan)	6	(0)
2006	→ Walsall (loan)	15	(1)
2006	→ Yeovil Town (loan)	6	(0)
2006	→ Grimsby Town (loan)	2	(0)
2007	→ Swindon Town (loan)	2	(0)
2007	Welling United	?	(?)
2007–2008	Woking	18	(0)
2008	Crawley Town	12	(2)
2008–2009	Chelmsford City	1	(0)
2010–2017	Dulwich Hamlet	175	(35)

Managerial career
- 2026: Walton & Hersham
- * Club domestic league appearances and goals

Kevin Ernest James (born 3 January 1980) is an English football coach and former professional player.

== Club career ==
James was initially a Charlton trainee, but was released at the age of 20, joining Gillingham. Here he showed promise, and after four years he moved on to Nottingham Forest in 2004.

However, his time at Forest was not successful and he made few appearances for the club. In the 2004–05 season he was loaned out to Boston United, and the following season was loaned to Walsall. At Walsall he scored on his debut in an FA Cup tie against Barnsley, and scored again as Walsall won the subsequent replay. James' FA Cup scoring form continued when he scored in the next round against Stoke City. He scored his fourth and final goal for Walsall, and his only league goal for the club, in a 2–2 draw with Bradford City on 25 March 2006.

In 2006–07 he was loaned out three times to Yeovil Town, Grimsby Town and Swindon Town, without scoring during any of those loan spells.

He was released in 2007 and subsequently joined Welling United for a couple of games before moving onto Woking. He played at Woking on non-contract terms, making 18 league appearances and four cup appearances (scoring one goal in the FA Trophy tie at Hemel Hempstead Town) before deciding to leave in January 2008 after failing to agree terms for the rest of the season.

On 16 January 2008, James joined Crawley Town until the end of 2007–08 season. He left Crawley Town in March 2008.

On 1 July 2008, he signed a contract at Chelmsford City, becoming the club's third signing for the 2008–09 season. He went on to join Dulwich Hamlet at the start of 2010, going on to make his debut on 6 February 2010 against Chatham Town. He spent nearly eight seasons with Dulwich, making 235 appearances and scoring 38 goals in all competitions, and becoming a key member of the club's coaching staff under manager Gavin Rose, before announcing his departure from the club on 9 November 2017, with Rose commenting "Kev will be a huge loss to the management team and the club on the whole, he has so much to offer the game and we're sure he'll be back playing or coaching somewhere very soon. The club have lost a great servant in the short term, but his hard work and dedication will be remembered."

== Coaching career ==
In 2019, James was appointed as the England six-a-side team Assistant Manager. Along with Manager, Jamie Leggett, they won the Home Nations Championship before heading to Crete for the World Cup. They reached the last eight, before losing to host nation Greece in front of a sell out 3,000 crowd.

In July 2023, James joined Charlton Athletic as a Professional Development Phase Coach.

On 1 June 2026, James was appointed the first-team manager of newly-promoted National League South club, Walton & Hersham on a three-year deal.

On 31 August 2026, James left the club after just under three months in charge.
