= Paul Shaw (footballer) =

English footballer and coach

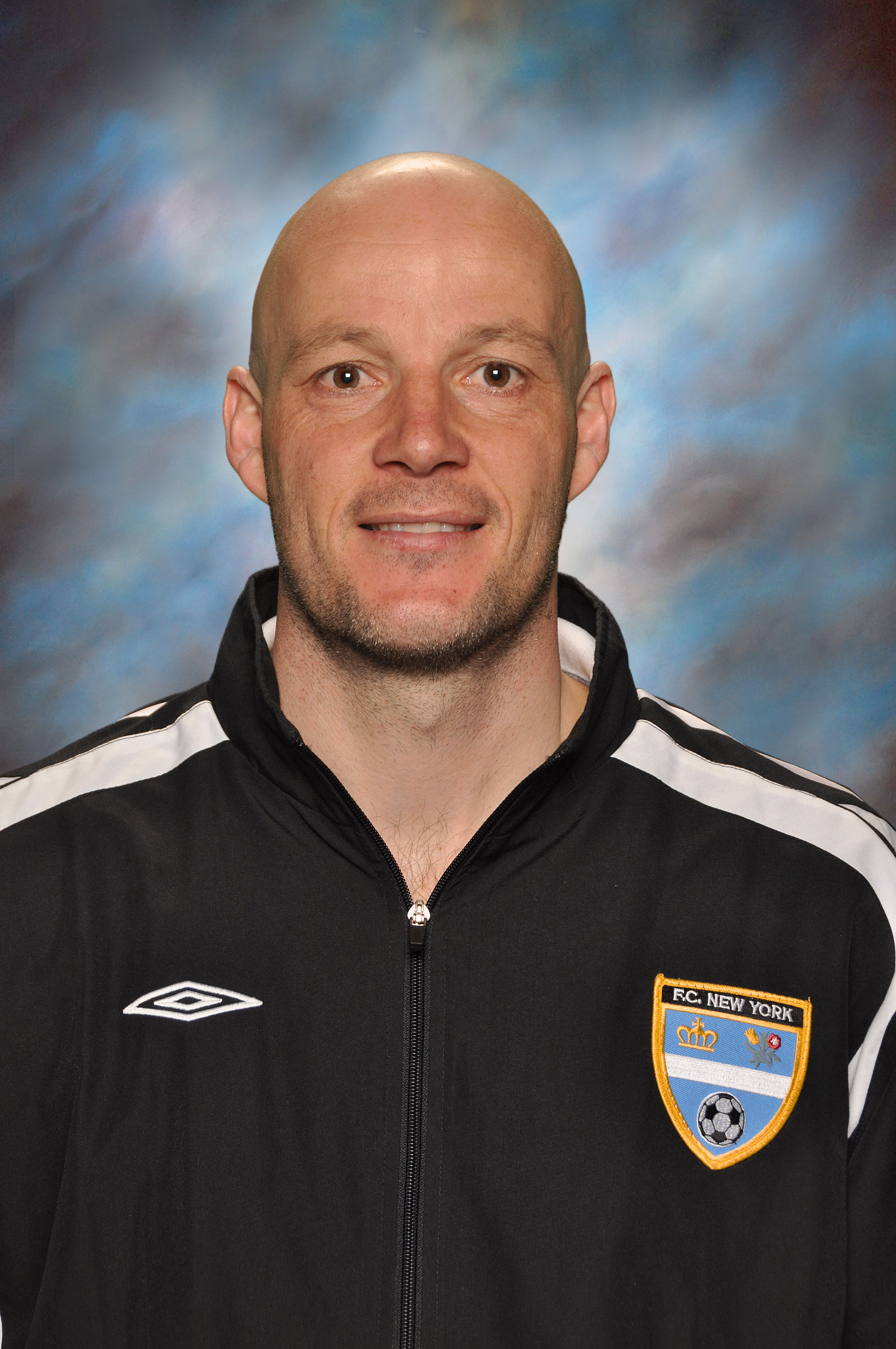

Personal information
- Date of birth: 4 September 1973 (age 53)
- Place of birth: Burnham, England
- Positions: Attacking midfielder; forward

Youth career
- Arsenal

Senior career*
Years	Team	Apps	(Gls)
1991–1997	Arsenal	12	(2)
1995	→ Burnley (loan)	9	(4)
1995	→ Cardiff City (loan)	6	(0)
1995–1996	→ Peterborough United (loan)	12	(5)
1997–2000	Millwall	109	(25)
2000–2004	Gillingham	125	(26)
2004–2006	Sheffield United	35	(8)
2004	→ Rotherham United (loan)	9	(2)
2006	Rotherham United	17	(4)
2006–2007	Chesterfield	30	(4)
2007	Oxford United	10	(2)
2008–2010	Ferencváros	48	(21)
2010–2011	Retford United	12	(3)
2011	F.C. New York	6	(0)
Total		440	(106)

International career
- England Youth

Managerial career
- 2011: F.C. New York (assistant)
- 2011: F.C. New York (interim)
- 2013–2016: Orlando City U-23
- * Club domestic league appearances and goals as of 17:48, 28 February 2019 (UTC)

Paul Shaw (born 4 September 1973) is an English retired footballer who played as an attacking midfielder and a forward. He has also worked as a coach at F.C. New York and with Orlando City U-23.

== Playing career ==
Shaw started his career as a trainee at Arsenal, turning professional in 1991. His debut came against Nottingham Forest on 3 December 1994. Unable to break into the Arsenal first team, Shaw spent periods on loan with Burnley, Cardiff City and Peterborough United during his time at Arsenal, before he was sold to Millwall in September 1997. He made 13 appearances in six years for the Gunners, all but one of them as substitute, scoring two goals with both coming against Southampton in the 1996–97 season, one at home and one away.

Shaw spent three years with Millwall before moving to Gillingham in 2000. He left Gillingham for Sheffield United in 2004 but unable to break into the first team had a loan spells at Rotherham United. He subsequently signed for the team but after just 17 appearances moved on a free transfer to Chesterfield in 2006. He found his opportunities at Saltergate limited, and left the club by mutual consent in August 2007 and joined Oxford United shortly afterwards. In October 2007 he left Oxford to join Hungarian team Ferencvárosi TC.

Shaw returned to English football by joining Retford United of the NPL Premier Division. He left the club in February 2011 and signed as captain of the new American side F.C. New York in the USL Pro league on 1 March 2011.

On 23 May 2011, it was announced that Coach Matt Weston had resigned from his position at F.C. New York, and Paul Shaw had been made interim head coach.

== Coaching career ==
On 21 May 2012, Shaw was named the boys' senior academy coaching director for the youth academy of Orlando City Soccer Club.
