= Mark Saunders (footballer) =

English footballer and manager

Personal information
- Date of birth: 23 July 1971 (age 55)
- Place of birth: Reading, England
- Position: Midfielder

Team information
- Current team: Exmouth Town

Senior career*
Years	Team	Apps	(Gls)
?–1995	Tiverton Town		
1995–1998	Plymouth Argyle	72	(11)
1998–2006	Gillingham	176	(15)
- Folkestone Invicta
- Maidstone United
2008–	Tiverton Town	103	(12)

Managerial career
- 2010–2013: Tiverton Town
- * Club domestic league appearances and goals as of 14 September 2007

Mark Saunders (born 23 July 1971 in Reading) is an English professional footballer, who plays for, and is assistant manager for, Exmouth Town. He previously played for Plymouth Argyle and Gillingham and made nearly 250 Football League appearances in an 11-year career.

Saunders was appointed as Tiverton Town's assistant manager in June 2010. and took over as manager in November 2010.

In July 2013 Saunders became player/assistant manager at Exmouth Town.
