= Danny Spiller =

English footballer (born 1981)

Personal information
- Full name: Daniel Spiller
- Date of birth: 10 October 1981 (age 45)
- Place of birth: Maidstone, England
- Height: 5 ft 9 in (1.75 m)
- Position: Midfielder

Youth career
- ?–2000: Gillingham

Senior career*
Years	Team	Apps	(Gls)
2000–2007	Gillingham	128	(6)
2002	→ Longford Town (loan)	4	(1)
2007–2009	Millwall	8	(1)
2009	Wycombe Wanderers	0	(0)
2009	Welling United	1	(0)
2009–2010	Dagenham & Redbridge	10	(0)
2010–2012	Gillingham	45	(4)
2012–2013	Luton Town	0	(0)
2015	Herne Bay	9	(1)
Total		205	(13)
- * Club domestic league appearances and goals

Daniel Spiller (born 10 October 1981) is an English former professional footballer.

== Career ==
Spiller began his professional career with Gillingham. A product of the club's youth system, he signed his first professional contract in 2000 but saw his first season ravaged by injury and did not make his league debut in the 2001–02 season. In January 2002, he joined League of Ireland Premier Division side Longford Town on loan along with Richard Rose. Spiller came to the fore during the 2003–04 season when he was player of the season after a string of man-of-the-match performances. He finished the season by signing a contract keeping him at Priestfield Stadium until 2007. In 2004 West Ham tabled a bid of £750,000 for Spiller which was subsequently turned down by the Gillingham board. Gillingham chairman Paul Scally was quoted as saying "anything under a million is an insult".

Predominantly a midfielder, Spiller has also played as a striker, and right-back, although his preferred position is in central midfield.

On 11 June 2007, it was announced that Spiller had agreed terms to join Millwall on 1 July 2007. After struggling with injuries, Spiller only managed 10 appearances for Millwall, scoring one goal in a 1–0 home victory over Cheltenham Town. On 27 May 2009, Spiller was released from his contract at Millwall.

Spiller signed on non-contract terms with Wycombe Wanderers for a month during August 2009, before leaving the club to sign for Welling United on 4 September 2009. After making one appearance and spending 6 days with Welling, Spiller joined League Two side Dagenham & Redbridge on a contract until January 2010. His debut for Dagenham & Redbridge came on 12 September when he came on as a substitute for Danny Green in a 2–1 home win against Chesterfield.

When Andy Hessenthaler re-joined Gillingham as manager, he brought Spiller in on trial, and signed him on a five-month contract. He made his second debut for Gillingham in a 1–1 home draw against Cheltenham Town on 7 August 2010, and the contract was extended for a further year and a half in December 2010.

Spiller signed a two-year contract with Conference Premier side Luton Town on 17 June 2012 after his release from Gillingham. He injured his Achilles tendon shortly after signing and did not play a single game for the club throughout the 2012–13 season. After numerous unsuccessful operations, Luton terminated Spiller's contract in July 2013, stating that the long-term prognosis of his injury was "showing little signs of improvement".

On 12 February 2015, Spiller signed for Isthmian League Division One South side Herne Bay. Three days later, he scored the second goal in a 2-0 derby victory against Ramsgate, but after making seven further appearances in the 2014-15 season, and one in the next, he did not play for the club again.

== Career statistics ==
Appearances and goals by club, season and competition
Club	Season	League			FA Cup		League Cup		Other		Total	
Club	Season	Division	Apps	Goals	Apps	Goals	Apps	Goals	Apps	Goals	Apps	Goals
Gillingham	2000–01	First Division	0	0	0	0	0	0	0	0	0	0
Gillingham	2001–02	First Division	1	0	0	0	0	0	0	0	1	0
Gillingham	2002–03	First Division	10	0	1	0	2	0	0	0	13	0
Gillingham	2003–04	First Division	39	6	2	0	2	0	0	0	43	6
Gillingham	2004–05	Championship	22	0	0	0	1	0	0	0	23	0
Gillingham	2005–06	League One	31	0	0	0	0	0	2 (Note: Appearance(s) in Football League Trophy)	0	33	0
Gillingham	2006–07	League One	25	0	0	0	0	0	0	0	25	0
Gillingham	Total		128	6	3	0	5	0	2	0	138	6
Longford Town (loan)	2001–02	League of Ireland Premier Division	4	1	0	0	0	0	0	0	4	1
Millwall	2007–08	League One	6	1	0	0	1	0	0	0	7	1
Millwall	2008–09	League One	2	0	1	0	0	0	0	0	3	0
Millwall	Total		8	1	1	0	1	0	0	0	10	1
Wycombe Wanderers	2009–10	League One	0	0	0	0	1	0	0	0	1	0
Welling United	2009–10	Conference South	1	0	0	0	0	0	0	0	0	0
Dagenham & Redbridge	2009–10	League Two	10	0	0	0	0	0	0	0	10	0
Gillingham	2010–11	League Two	30	2	1	0	1	0	1	0	33	2
Gillingham	2011–12	League Two	15	2	0	0	1	0	0	0	16	2
Gillingham	Total		45	4	1	0	2	0	1	0	49	4
Luton Town	2012–13	Conference Premier	0	0	0	0	0	0	0	0	0	0
Herne Bay	2014–15	Isthmian Division One South	8	1	0	0	0	0	0	0	8	1
Herne Bay	2015–16	Isthmian Division One South	1	0	0	0	0	0	1 (Note: Appearance(s) in Alan Turvey Trophy)	0	2	0
Herne Bay	Total		9	1	0	0	0	0	1	0	10	1
Career total			205	13	5	0	9	0	4	0	223	13

== Honours ==
=== Individual ===
- Gillingham Young Player of the Season: 2002–03
- Gillingham Player of the Season: 2003–04
