= David Perpetuini =

English footballer

Personal information
- Full name: David Peter Perpetuini
- Date of birth: 26 September 1979 (age 47)
- Place of birth: Hitchin, England
- Height: 5 ft 8 in (1.73 m)
- Position: Defender

Youth career
- ?–1997: Watford

Senior career*
| Years | Team | Apps | (Gls) |
| 1997–2001 | Watford | 19 | (1) |
| 2001–2005 | Gillingham | 86 | (5) |
| 2005 | Wycombe Wanderers | 2 | (0) |
| 2005 | Walsall | 7 | (0) |
| 2005–2006 | Stevenage Borough | 18 | (0) |
| 2007 | Rushden & Diamonds | 5 | (0) |
| 2007 | Kettering Town | ? | (?) |
| 2007 | Barton Rovers | ? | (?) |
| 2007–2008 | Halesowen Town | ? | (?) |
| 2008 | Brackley Town | ? | (?) |
| 2010 | Hemel Hempstead Town | ? | (?) |
| 2010 | Aylesbury | 15 | (0) |
| 2010–2012 | Arlesey Town | 32 | (0) |
- * Club domestic league appearances and goals

David Perpetuini (born 26 September 1979) is an English former footballer.

Perpetuini came through the youth system at Watford. He made his first-team debut on 20 March 1999, starting in a 0-0 First Division draw at home to Bury. He did not return to the Watford side until Boxing Day 1999, starting in a 4–0 defeat at Tottenham. Two days later, he scored his first professional goal, the opener in a 3–2 home victory over Southampton. He would go on to make 11 further appearances that campaign as Watford were relegated from the Premier League after one season.

In summer 2001 Perpetuini moved to Gillingham, playing for three and a half seasons in the second tier of English football. In June 2007, Perpetuini left Kettering Town. Later that summer he signed for Barton Rovers. He signed for Halesowen Town in November 2007. He moved to another Southern League Premier Division team, Brackley Town, just before the start of the 2008–09 season. In 2010, he joined Hemel Hempstead Town.

For the beginning of the 2010–11 season, Perpetuini joined Aylesbury. On 17 November 2010 he signed a contract for Arlesey Town.
