= Vince Bartram =

English footballer (born 1968)

Personal information
- Full name: Vincent Lee Bartram
- Date of birth: 7 August 1968 (age 58)
- Place of birth: Birmingham, England
- Height: 6 ft 2 in (1.88 m)
- Position: Goalkeeper

Youth career
- 1985–1986: Wolverhampton Wanderers

Senior career*
Years	Team	Apps	(Gls)
1986–1991	Wolverhampton Wanderers	5	(0)
1989	→ Blackpool (loan)	9	(0)
1990	→ Cheltenham Town (loan)	5	(0)
1991	→ West Bromwich Albion (loan)	0	(0)
1991–1994	AFC Bournemouth	132	(0)
1994–1998	Arsenal	11	(0)
1997	→ Huddersfield Town (loan)	12	(0)
1998	→ Gillingham (loan)	9	(0)
1998–2004	Gillingham	178	(0)
Total		361	(0)
- * Club domestic league appearances and goals

Vincent Lee Bartram (born 7 August 1968) is an English football coach and former professional footballer. He is currently the 1st team Goalkeeper Coach at National League side Eastleigh FC. He is also a Casual Goalkeeper scout for the City Football Group.

As a player he was a goalkeeper and he most notably played in the Premier League for Arsenal, where he was understudy to David Seaman throughout the majority of his time at Highbury. He also played in the Football League for Wolverhampton Wanderers, Blackpool, Cheltenham Town, West Bromwich Albion, AFC Bournemouth, Huddersfield Town and Gillingham.

== Playing career ==
Born in Birmingham, Bartram attended Hagley RC High School. His first professional club was Wolverhampton Wanderers who in 1985 signed him from West Midland League side Oldswinford FC. Bartram made his first team debut on 23 August 1986 in a 2–1 home defeat to Cambridge United, which marked the club's first-ever game in the fourth tier of English football. However, this proved his only Wolves league outing until April 1991 as the club brought in Mark Kendall, and later Mike Stowell, of whom were both virtual ever-presents at the club.

Instead, Bartram had loan spells with Blackpool, Cheltenham Town and West Bromwich Albion, before finally leaving Molineux for AFC Bournemouth in July 1991 for £35,000. He played 132 league games for Bournemouth before moving to Arsenal for £250,000 in 1994. At Arsenal he was David Seaman's understudy, and played just 11 league games in four seasons (all in 1994–95). To gain playing time, he spent 12 games on loan with Huddersfield Town in late 1997.

He signed for Gillingham on loan in March 1998 before the move was made permanent in the summer of 1998. He firmly established himself as the first-choice goalkeeper at Priestfield Stadium and helped them to the Division Two play-off final in his first full season, where they lost out to Manchester City on penalties. The following season saw them go one step further as they beat Wigan Athletic in the play-off final to reach the second tier for the first time in the club's history.

In total, he made over 200 appearances for the Gills, before his retirement from the game in February 2004 due to a wrist injury. The injury was caused by a collision with the opposition goalkeeper, Tony Warner, who had come upfield to try and score a goal from a last-minute corner.

== Coaching career ==
Bartram is currently the 1st team Goalkeeper Coach at Eastleigh FC in the National League. Prior to that, he spent 12 and half years at Southampton academy with responsibility for the development of goalkeepers. Prior to this he held coaching roles at Bournemouth and Portsmouth.

== Personal life ==
Bartram is married to Tracy, a former international netball player and the couple have two sons, Heath and Miles. Bartram also worked in the role of a summariser for BBC Radio Kent. His eldest son, Miles, is also a goalkeeper, playing for Wessex League side Romsey Town. His youngest son, Heath, is also a goalkeeper, undertaking a scholarship with Eastleigh and played for Wessex League side Brockenhurst before signing in June 2024 with Shaftesbury and also dual registered with Wessex League side Bournemouth Poppies

== Honours ==
Gillingham

- Football League Second Division play-offs: 2000
