= Chris Hope (footballer) =

English footballer

Personal information
- Full name: Christopher Jonathan Hope
- Date of birth: 14 November 1972 (age 54)
- Place of birth: Sheffield, England
- Position: Defender

Youth career
- ?–1989: Billingham Synthonia

Senior career*
Years	Team	Apps	(Gls)
1990	Darlington	0	(0)
1990–1993	Nottingham Forest	0	(0)
1992–1993	→ Kettering Town (loan)	23	(3)
1993–2000	Scunthorpe United	291	(19)
2000–2006	Gillingham	236	(13)
2006–2009	Rushden & Diamonds	128	(10)
2009–2011	Corby Town	21+	(3+)
2010–2011	Oxford City	1	(0)
2011–2012	St Neots Town	39	(4)
2012–2013	Rushden & Diamonds	30	(4)
2014–2016	Thrapston Town	50	(10)
Total		819+	(66+)
- * Club domestic league appearances and goals

Christopher Jonathan Hope (born 14 November 1972) is an English former footballer who played as a defender. Hope made over 500 appearances in the Football League for Scunthorpe United and Gillingham between 1993 and 2006.

He has also amassed over 1,000 official appearances, if including an estimate of more than 60 official appearances for Corby Town over two seasons, the majority of which is only referenced by matchday programmes and other non-digitized form of information. He has over 940 appearances for all the other clubs he played for.

== Career ==
Born in Sheffield, Hope was raised in Stockton-on-Tees, after his family relocated to the North-East following his father, John, joining Hartlepool United in 1975. Hope initially played youth football for Billingham Synthonia, before following in his father's footsteps in joining Darlington just one week before he was due to start as an apprentice pipe-fitter.

Hope was then offered professional terms just one year into his apprenticeship; but after a chance end-of-season encounter between Darlington's and Nottingham Forest's first-team squads in Majorca, he was recommended to Brian Clough by then-Darlington boss Brian Little. After a successful trial with Forest's under-19's squad, the City Ground club paid Darlington £50,000 for the defender.

Hope never made a first-team appearance for Forest, but was a member of their travelling party for the 1991 FA Cup Final. In addition to meeting Prince Charles and Princess Diana pre-match, Hope was infamously then forced to help Clough get changed on top of the Royal Car, before later being dispatched to block TV cameras from focusing on the Forest manager.

During his final season in Nottinghamshire, Hope also had a successful loan spell with Graham Carr's Kettering Town, making 23 appearances and scoring three goals for the Northamptonshire club.

Turning down interest from seven other Football League clubs that summer, including Stoke City, Hope signed for Scunthorpe United on a free transfer. Despite having previously rejected Hope when a youth coach at Glanford Park in 1989, now manager Richard Money gave the defender his debut in the season-opener away at Springfield Park against Wigan Athletic.

Over the next seven years Hope became an integral part of the Scunthorpe side, going on to make 337 appearances and score 22 goals for the club. This included captaining the club to its first promotion in 16 years, and only victory at the original Wembley Stadium, thanks to the 1998–99 Third Division play-off final against Leyton Orient.

Between 9 March 1996 and 28 December 1999, Hope did not miss a single regular league or play-off game for the Lincolnshire club, and also only missed one of 27 FA Cup games during that time. This 178-league game stretch remains an all-time club record.

After their relegation from the Second Division in 1999–2000 however, Scunthorpe accepted a £250,000 offer for Hope, who signed a four-year contract for Gillingham. Hope made his debut in the club's first ever game in the First Division, a 3–1 home defeat to Stockport County, in August 2000, made 145 consecutive appearances and was rewarded with a new three-year contract in March 2003. He went on to play in 176 successive games before finally missing a game through suspension. Following the departure of ex-club captain Paul Smith, Hope was appointed the club captain for the Gills for their first season back in League One in the 2005–06 season. He missed much of the 2005–06 season due to injury, and was released by manager Ronnie Jepson at the end of the season having made over 250 league and cup appearances for Gillingham since joining from Scunthorpe.

Hope signed a two-year deal with Conference National club Rushden & Diamonds in July 2006. Rushden manager Paul Hart described him as "... a gutsy battler who shows great leadership, his integrity and honesty is a terrific example, and he is the perfect role model for our younger players. His experience will be of great benefit", and named him team captain for the 2006–07 season. He was released by Rushden & Diamonds at the end of the 2007–08 season owing to financial constraints, and turned down a move to Dover Athletic, managed by former Gillingham teammate Andy Hessenthaler, as he was unable to relocate to Kent. He joined Conference North club Corby Town in June 2009 for the 2009–10 season.

Hope joined Southern Football League Division One Central side St Neots Town in summer 2011. On 21 July 2012, Hope joined AFC Rushden & Diamonds. During the 2012–13 league campaign, he made 30 appearances for the club, scoring four goals.

Then, in 2014, he joined Thrapston Town, and stayed for four seasons, until the 2016–17 season.

In July 2017, he retired from playing.

== Personal life ==
Hope's father, John, played League football as a goalkeeper, and his younger brother Richard played as a defender.

Following his retirement from playing football professionally, Hope works at Kimbolton School in Cambridgeshire as a sports coach.

== Playing statistics ==
(to end of 2008–09 season)

Club	Seasons	League; Apps (goals)	FA Cup; Apps (goals)	League Cup; Apps (goals)	Other; Apps (goals)	Total; Apps (goals)
Darlington	1989–90	0 (0)	0 (0)	0 (0)	0 (0)	0 (0)
Nottingham Forest	1990–93	0 (0)	0 (0)	0 (0)	0 (0)	0 (0)
Scunthorpe United	1993–00	287 (19)	18 (1)	14 (0)	13 (0)	332 (20)
Gillingham	2000–06	236 (13)	12 (2)	16 (0)	0 (0)	264 (15)
Rushden & Diamonds	2006–09	128 (10)	4 (1)	0 (0)	3 (0)	135 (11)

== Honours ==
Scunthorpe United

- Football League Third Division play-offs: 1999

Individual

- PFA Team of the Year: 1998–99 Third Division

== See also ==
- List of men's footballers with 1,000 or more official appearances
