= 2006–07 Hereford United F.C. season =

Hereford United
2006–07 season
- Chairman: Graham Turner
- Manager: Graham Turner
- Stadium: Edgar Street
- League Two: 16th
- FA Cup: Third round
- League Cup: Second round
- Football League Trophy: First round (Southern)
- Top goalscorer: League: Alan Connell (9); All: Alan Connell (10)
- Highest home attendance: 5,201 v Bristol Rovers, League Two, 26 December 2006
- Lowest home attendance: 2,007 v Shrewsbury Town, Football League Trophy, 17 October 2006
- Average home league attendance: 3,328
- Biggest win: 4–0 v Port Vale (H), FA Cup, 2 December 2006
- Biggest defeat: 0–3 v Barnet (A), League Two, 19 August 2006; 1–4 v Mansfield Town (A), League Two, 9 September 2006; 0–3 v Shrewsbury Town (A), League Two, 16 December 2006; 0–3 v Macclesfield Town (A), League Two, 20 January 2007; 0–3 v Peterborough United (A), League Two, 21 April 2007
Home colours	Away colours

The 2006–07 season was the 86th competitive season of Hereford United Football Club and 26th season overall in the Football League. It was Hereford's first season in the Football League since the 1996–97 season. The club competed in League Two following their promotion from the Conference via the play-offs in the previous season, as well as the FA Cup, League Cup and Football League Trophy.

In the early part of 2007 Hereford were hovering in mid-table, and a notable 4–1 away win at eventual play-off semi-finalists Lincoln City lifted them to 8th position. However, from the end of February, the club went on a very poor run of form with only 8 points earned from the 13 remaining matches, only one of which was a win, meant that the club dropped as low as 17th, before eventually finishing 16th.

Two former players, Ben Smith and Steve Guinan, returned to the club in the January transfer window.

== First-team squad ==
As of 5 May 2007

Note: Flags indicate national team as defined under FIFA eligibility rules; some limited exceptions apply. Players may hold more than one non-FIFA nationality.

No.	Pos.	Nation	Player
1	GK	ENG	Wayne Brown
2	DF	ENG	Simon Travis
3	MF	ENG	Danny Thomas
4	DF	ENG	Richard Rose
5	DF	ENG	Tamika Mkandawire (captain)
6	MF	ENG	Rob Purdie
8	MF	ENG	Andy Ferrell
9	FW	ENG	Tim Sills
10	FW	WAL	Stuart Fleetwood
12	FW	ENG	Alan Connell
14	GK	ENG	Glyn Thompson

No.	Pos.	Nation	Player
15	MF	ENG	Sam Gwynne
16	FW	ENG	Andy Williams
17	DF	WAL	Martyn Giles
18	DF	AUS	Trent McClenahan
19	FW	ENG	Marcus Palmer
21	MF	ENG	Luke Webb
22	MF	ENG	Jordan Fitzpatrick
23	DF	ENG	Phil Gulliver
25	MF	ENG	Ben Smith
28	DF	ENG	Dean Beckwith
31	MF	ENG	Steve Jennings (on loan from Tranmere Rovers)

== Transfers ==
=== In ===
Date	Pos.	No.	Player	Transferred from	Fee	Ref.
9 June 2006	GK	1	(England) Wayne Brown	Chester City	Free transfer	
23 June 2006	FW	11	(England) Gareth Sheldon	Kidderminster Harriers	Free transfer	
29 June 2006	DF	4	(England) Richard Rose	Gillingham	Free transfer	
29 June 2006	FW	9	(England) Tim Sills	Oxford United	Free transfer	
29 June 2006	GK	14	(England) Glyn Thompson	Shrewsbury Town	Free transfer	
29 June 2006	MF	7	(England) Jon Wallis	Gillingham	Free transfer	
24 July 2006	FW	12	(England) Alan Connell	Torquay United	Free transfer	
28 July 2006	DF	17	(Wales) Martyn Giles	Carmarthen Town	Free transfer	
1 August 2006	DF	18	(Australia) Trent McClenahan	West Ham United	Free transfer	
4 August 2006	DF	23	(England) Phil Gulliver	Rushden & Diamonds	Free transfer	
31 August 2006	MF	21	(England) Luke Webb	Unattached	Free transfer	
4 September 2006	MF	22	(England) Jordan Fitzpatrick	Wolverhampton Wanderers	Free transfer	
4 September 2006	FW	19	(England) Marcus Palmer	Unattached	Free transfer	
25 January 2007	MF	25	(England) Ben Smith	Weymouth	Undisclosed	
25 January 2007	MF	3	(England) Danny Thomas	Shrewsbury Town	Free transfer	

=== Out ===
Date	Pos.	No.	Player	To club	Fee	Ref.
25 May 2006	DF	6	(Wales) Tony James	Weymouth	Free transfer	
25 May 2006	FW	10	(Cameroon) Guy Ipoua	Released	Free transfer	
25 May 2006	MF	8	(England) Jamie Pitman	Forest Green Rovers	Free transfer	
31 May 2006	DF	2	(Wales) Ryan Green	Bristol Rovers	Free transfer	
12 June 2006	FW	9	(England) Adam Stansfield	Exeter City	Free transfer	
13 June 2006	FW	18	(England) Danny Carey-Bertram	Cambridge United	Free transfer	
23 June 2006	MF	15	(England) Craig Stanley	Released	Free transfer	
27 February 2007	FW	11	(England) Gareth Sheldon	Released	Free transfer	
27 March 2007	MF	7	(England) Jon Wallis	Dover Athletic	Free transfer	
30 April 2007	DF	20	(France) Alex Jeannin	Released	Free transfer	

=== Loans in ===
Start date	End date	Pos.	No.	Player	From club	Ref.
8 August 2006		GK	33	(England) Scott Tynan	Rushden & Diamonds	
13 October 2006	15 December 2006	MF	31	(England) John Eustace	Stoke City	
26 October 2006	18 December 2006	MF	3	(England) Neil MacKenzie	Scunthorpe United	
18 January 2007	End of season	MF	31	(England) Steve Jennings	Tranmere Rovers	
25 January 2007	21 April 2007	FW	24	(England) Steve Guinan	Cheltenham Town	

=== Loans out ===
Start date	End date	Pos.	No.	Player	To club	Ref.
28 October 2006	28 December 2006	MF	7	(England) Jon Wallis	Dover Athletic	
31 January 2007	28 February 2007	FW	10	(Wales) Stuart Fleetwood	Accrington Stanley	
20 February 2007	20 March 2007	MF	7	(England) Jon Wallis	Dagenham & Redbridge	
22 March 2007	22 April 2007	MF	8	(England) Andy Ferrell	Kidderminster Harriers	

== Competitions ==
=== Overall record ===
Competition	First match	Last match	Starting round	Final position	Record							
Competition	First match	Last match	Starting round	Final position	Pld	W	D	L	GF	GA	GD	Win %
League Two	5 August 2006	5 May 2007	Matchday 1	16th	46	14	13	19	45	53	−8	30.43
FA Cup	11 November 2006	5 January 2007	First round	Third round	4	2	1	1	6	1	+5	50.00
League Cup	22 August 2006	19 September 2006	First round	Second round	2	1	0	1	4	4	+0	50.00
Football League Trophy	17 October 2006		First round	First round	1	0	0	1	1	2	−1	0.00
Total					53	17	14	22	56	60	−4	32.08

Source: Competitions

=== League Two ===
==== League table ====
Pos	Team	Pld	W	D	L	GF	GA	GD	Pts
14	Barnet	46	16	11	19	55	70	−15	59
15	Grimsby Town	46	17	8	21	57	73	−16	59
16	Hereford United	46	14	13	19	45	53	−8	55
17	Mansfield Town	46	14	12	20	58	63	−5	54
18	Chester City	46	13	14	19	40	48	−8	53

Rules for classification: In the Football League goals scored (GF) takes precedence over goal difference (GD).

==== Results by round ====
Round	1	2	3	4	5	6	7	8	9	10	11	12	13	14	15	16	17	18	19	20	21	22	23	24	25	26	27	28	29	30	31	32	33	34	35	36	37	38	39	40	41	42	43	44	45	46
Ground	A	H	H	A	H	A	A	H	H	A	A	H	A	H	A	H	A	H	A	H	H	A	A	H	H	A	H	A	H	A	H	H	A	H	A	A	H	A	A	H	H	A	H	A	H	A
Result	W	L	W	L	W	D	L	L	W	L	L	W	L	D	W	W	W	L	D	D	D	L	W	D	W	D	L	L	W	D	L	W	W	D	D	L	L	L	L	D	D	L	W	L	L	D
Position	4	11	6	13	8	7	11	12	11	12	15	13	15	15	12	8	8	10	9	10	12	14	10	10	8	8	12	14	10	9	11	11	9	9	9	10	12	14	17	16	17	17	15	16	16	16
Points	3	3	6	6	9	10	10	10	13	13	13	16	16	17	20	23	26	26	27	28	29	29	32	33	36	37	37	37	40	41	41	44	47	48	49	49	49	49	49	50	51	51	54	54	54	55

Source: Football Web Pages
A = Away; H = Home; W = Win; D = Draw; L = Loss

==== Matches ====
Win Draw Loss

5 August 2006 1	Stockport County	0–2	Hereford United	Stockport
15:00 BST		Report	Fleetwood 36'; Mkandawire 59'	Stadium: Edgeley Park; Attendance: 5,297

8 August 2006 2	Hereford United	1–2	Lincoln City	Hereford
19:45 BST	Tynan (yellow card) 45'; Purdie 77' (pen.); Fleetwood (yellow card) 86'		Stallard 11', 29'	Stadium: Edgar Street; Attendance: 4,405

12 August 2006 3	Hereford United	2–0	Chester City	Hereford
15:00 BST	Fleetwood 71'; Rose 73'			Stadium: Edgar Street; Attendance: 3,834

19 August 2006 4	Barnet	3–0	Hereford United	Chipping Barnet
15:00 BST	Grazioli 28' (yellow card) 30'; Hendon (yellow card) 29'; Bailey 62'; Puncheon 90'		Giles (yellow card) 55'	Stadium: Underhill; Attendance: 1,945

26 August 2006 5	Hereford United	3–1	Hartlepool United	Hereford
15:00 BST	Sills 33'; Purdie 51' (pen.); Mkandawire (yellow card) 68'; Williams 73'		Liddle (yellow card) 20'; Brown 53'	Stadium: Edgar Street; Attendance: 3,156

2 September 2006 6	Rochdale	1–1	Hereford United	Rochdale
15:00 BST	Sharp (yellow card) 51'; Crooks (yellow card) 68'; Doolan (yellow card) 73'; Sako (yellow card) 90'; Jones 90' (pen.)		Purdie 90' (pen.)	Stadium: Spotland; Attendance: 2,146

9 September 2006 7	Mansfield Town	4–1	Hereford United	Mansfield
15:00 BST	Mkandawire 20' (o.g.); Barker 38', 72' (pen.); Reet 49'		Connell 68'	Stadium: Field Mill; Attendance: 3,242

12 September 2006 8	Hereford United	1–2	Wycombe Wanderers	Hereford
19:45 BST	Williams 51'; Jeannin (yellow card) 83'		Easter 33', 74'; Martin (yellow card) 37'; Betsy (yellow card) 45'	Stadium: Edgar Street; Attendance: 2,585

16 September 2006 9	Hereford United	1–0	Bury	Hereford
15:00 BST	Williams 80'		Brass (yellow card) 74'	Stadium: Edgar Street; Attendance: 2,885

24 September 2006 10	Wrexham	1–0	Hereford United	Wrexham
12:00 BST	Valentine (yellow card) 24'; Evans 28'; Roche (yellow card) 45'; Williams (yellow card) 65'		Rose (yellow card) 4'; Beckwith (yellow card) 55'	Stadium: Racecourse Ground; Attendance: 4,705

27 September 2006 11	Bristol Rovers	2–1	Hereford United	Bristol
19:45 BST	Walker 67', 68'		Purdie 18' (pen.); McClenahan (yellow card) 45'; Mkandawire (yellow card) 85'	Stadium: Memorial Stadium; Attendance: 4,975

30 September 2006 12	Hereford United	1–0	Macclesfield Town	Hereford
15:00 BST	Connell 80'			Stadium: Edgar Street; Attendance: 2,705

8 October 2006 13	Grimsby Town	2–1	Hereford United	Cleethorpes
16:00 BST	Jones 9', 61'		Purdie 26' (pen.); Connell (yellow card) 87'	Stadium: Blundell Park; Attendance: 4,147

14 October 2006 14	Hereford United	1–1	Darlington	Hereford
15:00 BST	Mkandawire 71'		Armstrong 37'	Stadium: Edgar Street; Attendance: 2,838

21 October 2006 15	Milton Keynes Dons	1–3	Hereford United	Milton Keynes
15:00 BST	McLeod 59'; Baines (yellow card) 21'; Platt (yellow card) 81'		Connell 8'; Purdie 22' (pen.); Eustace (yellow card) 41'; Mkandawire (yellow card) 66'; Fleetwood (yellow card) 71'; Brown (yellow card) 74'; Williams (yellow card) 83'; Fleetwood 90'	Stadium: National Hockey Stadium; Attendance: 5,609

28 October 2006 16	Hereford United	1–0	Accrington Stanley	Hereford
15:00 BST	Williams (yellow card) 72'; Connell (yellow card) 76' (goal) 85'		Welch (yellow card) 25'	Stadium: Edgar Street; Attendance: 3,391

4 November 2006 17	Swindon Town	1–2	Hereford United	Swindon
15:00 GMT	Roberts 32'; Pook (yellow card) 79'		Williams 36', 81'; Connell (yellow card) 73'	Stadium: County Ground; Attendance: 6,910

18 November 2006 18	Hereford United	0–1	Walsall	Hereford
15:00 GMT			Westwood 63'; Butler (yellow card) 65'; Demontagnac (yellow card) 90'	Stadium: Edgar Street; Attendance: 4,462

25 November 2006 19	Boston United	1–1	Hereford United	Boston
15:00 GMT	Clarke 74'; Ryan (yellow card) 90'		Mkandawire (yellow card) 8'; Williams 68'; MacKenzie (yellow card) 76'	Stadium: York Street; Attendance: 1,731

5 December 2006 20	Hereford United	0–0	Peterborough United	Hereford
19:45 GMT			Branston (yellow card) 82'; Arber (yellow card) 84'	Stadium: Edgar Street; Attendance: 2,309

9 December 2006 21	Hereford United	1–1	Torquay United	Hereford
15:00 GMT	Jeannin 33'		Angus 2'; Critchell (yellow card) 24'	Stadium: Edgar Street; Attendance: 3,078

16 December 2006 22	Shrewsbury Town	3–0	Hereford United	Shrewsbury
12:00 GMT	Cooke 35', 66'; Edwards 78'; Hope (yellow card) 80'		Jeannin (yellow card) 7'; Beckwith (red card) 76'; MacKenzie (yellow card) 80'; Gulliver (yellow card) 87'	Stadium: Gay Meadow; Attendance: 4,177

22 December 2006 23	Notts County	0–1	Hereford United	Nottingham
19:45 GMT	Silk (yellow card) 42'; White (yellow card) 90'		Sills 81'	Stadium: Meadow Lane; Attendance: 4,106

26 December 2006 24	Hereford United	0–0	Bristol Rovers	Hereford
12:30 GMT				Stadium: Edgar Street; Attendance: 5,201

30 December 2006 25	Hereford United	2–0	Wrexham	Hereford
12:00 GMT	Connell 37', 88'; Sills (yellow card) 69'		Llewellyn (yellow card) 68'; Roche (yellow card) 90'	Stadium: Edgar Street; Attendance: 3,444

1 January 2007 26	Wycombe Wanderers	0–0	Hereford United	High Wycombe
15:00 GMT	Onibuje (yellow card) 60'; Mooney (yellow card) 69'		Travis (yellow card) 62'	Stadium: Adams Park; Attendance: 4,851

13 January 2007 27	Hereford United	1–3	Mansfield Town	Hereford
15:00 GMT	Sheldon 90'		Conlon 10'; Boulding 79'; Gritton 90'	Stadium: Edgar Street; Attendance: 3,048

20 January 2007 28	Macclesfield Town	3–0	Hereford United	Macclesfield
15:00 GMT	McIntyre 17' (pen.) (yellow card) 26'; Murphy 61', 83'		Ferrell (red card) 16'	Stadium: Moss Rose; Attendance: 2,494

27 January 2007 29	Hereford United	3–2	Notts County	Hereford
15:00 GMT	McClenahan 9'; Guinan 27', 68' (yellow card) 65'		Lee 7', 64'; Edwards (yellow card) 11'; Gleeson (yellow card) 80'	Stadium: Edgar Street; Attendance: 3,280

30 January 2007 30	Bury	2–2	Hereford United	Bury
19:45 GMT	Baker 29'; Hurst 58'; Adams (yellow card) 81'; Fitzgerald (yellow card) 83'		Mkandawire (yellow card) 36'; Adams 63' (o.g.); Williams 78'	Stadium: Gigg Lane; Attendance: 1,775

3 February 2007 31	Hereford United	0–2	Stockport County	Hereford
15:00 GMT		Report	Bramble 33'; Elding 38'	Stadium: Edgar Street; Attendance: 3,310; Referee: Andy D'Urso

17 February 2007 32	Hereford United	2–0	Barnet	Hereford
15:00 GMT	Smith 48'; Thomas 90'			Stadium: Edgar Street; Attendance: 2,608

20 February 2007 33	Lincoln City	1–4	Hereford United	Lincoln
19:45 GMT	Weir-Daley 56'; Mettam (red card) 79'		Connell 3'; McClenahan (yellow card) 26'; Guinan 36', 45', 54'	Stadium: Sincil Bank; Attendance: 4,695

24 February 2007 34	Hereford United	0–0	Rochdale	Hereford
15:00 GMT			Stanton (yellow card) 81'	Stadium: Edgar Street; Attendance: 3,090

27 February 2007 35	Chester City	1–1	Hereford United	Chester
19:45 GMT	Hessey (yellow card) 31'; Artell (yellow card) 62'; Yeo 71'		Connell 82'	Stadium: Deva Stadium; Attendance: 1,842

3 March 2007 36	Hartlepool United	3–2	Hereford United	Hartlepool
15:00 GMT	Barron (yellow card) 30'; Clark 32'; Brown 54'; Humphreys (yellow card) 66'; Williams 68'		Thomas 45' (yellow card) 58'; Guinan 56'	Stadium: Victoria Park; Attendance: 5,535

10 March 2007 37	Hereford United	0–1	Grimsby Town	Hereford
15:00 GMT			Bolland 76'	Stadium: Edgar Street; Attendance: 2,914

17 March 2007 38	Darlington	1–0	Hereford United	Darlington
15:00 GMT	Wright 67'			Stadium: The Darlington Arena; Attendance: 3,165

24 March 2007 39	Accrington Stanley	2–0	Hereford United	Accrington
15:00 GMT	Brown 26' (red card) 89'; Cavanagh 54'; Richardson (yellow card) 65'; Williams (yellow card) 85'			Stadium: Crown Ground; Attendance: 1,848

31 March 2007 40	Hereford United	0–0	Milton Keynes Dons	Hereford
15:00 BST			Lewington (yellow card) 72'; Edds (yellow card) 85'	Stadium: Edgar Street; Attendance: 2,715

7 April 2007 41	Hereford United	0–0	Swindon Town	Hereford
15:00 BST	Sills (yellow card) 81' (yellow-red card) 81'		Zaaboub (yellow card) 6'; Smith (yellow card) 22'; Brown (yellow card) 88'; Timlin (yellow card) 90'; Roberts (yellow card) 90'	Stadium: Edgar Street; Attendance: 4,740

9 April 2007 42	Walsall	1–0	Hereford United	Walsall
15:00 BST	Keates 83'; Fox (yellow card) 85'		Beckwith (red card) 79'	Stadium: Bescot Stadium; Attendance: 5,658

14 April 2007 43	Hereford United	3–0	Boston United	Hereford
15:00 BST	Guinan 56' (yellow card) 57'; Williams 71'; Connell 90'	Report	Galbraith (yellow card) 31'; Broughton (yellow card) 67'	Stadium: Edgar Street; Attendance: 2,176; Referee: Phil Joslin

21 April 2007 44	Peterborough United	3–0	Hereford United	Peterborough
15:00 BST	Mackail-Smith 1'; White 13'; Strachan 50'			Stadium: London Road; Attendance: 3,759

28 April 2007 45	Hereford United	0–1	Shrewsbury Town	Hereford
12:00 BST	Travis (yellow card) 90'		Drummond 45'	Stadium: Edgar Street; Attendance: 4,359

5 May 2007 46	Torquay United	0–0	Hereford United	Torquay
15:00 BST	McKoy (yellow card) 89'		Beckwith (yellow card) 81'	Stadium: Plainmoor; Attendance: 2,942

Source: Football Web Pages

=== FA Cup ===
The club entered the competition in the first round and were drawn away to fierce rivals Shrewsbury Town, knocking them out via a replay. They were drawn at home against Port Vale in the second round, playing a league above Hereford in League One, with Hereford producing an upset to win 4–0. Upon reaching the third round, they were drawn away to divisional rivals Bristol Rovers, where a first half Richard Walker penalty was enough to knock Hereford out of the competition.

Win Draw Loss

11 November 2006 First round	Shrewsbury Town	0–0	Hereford United	Shrewsbury
12:00 GMT		Report	Williams (yellow card) 87'	Stadium: Gay Meadow; Attendance: 5,574; Referee: Darren Drysdale

21 November 2006 Replay	Hereford United	2–0	Shrewsbury Town	Hereford
19:45 GMT	Sills (yellow card) 7'; Purdie (yellow card) 25'; Ferrell (yellow card) 79'; Connell 85'; Webb 88'	Report	Burton (yellow card) 7'	Stadium: Edgar Street; Attendance: 4,224; Referee: Keith Stroud

2 December 2006 Second round	Hereford United	4–0	Port Vale	Hereford
13:00 GMT	Webb 41'; Purdie 49' (pen.), 51'; Ferrell 83'	Report	Goodlad (yellow card) 49'; Miles (yellow card) 59'	Stadium: Edgar Street; Attendance: 4,076; Referee: Lee Probert

5 January 2007 Third round	Bristol Rovers	1–0	Hereford United	Bristol
19:45 GMT	Walker 23' (pen.); Hinton (yellow card) 27'	Report	Ferrell (yellow card) 32'	Stadium: Memorial Stadium; Attendance: 8,978; Referee: Scott Mathieson

=== League Cup ===
The club entered the competition in the first round and were drawn at home to Coventry City, playing two leagues above Hereford in the Championship. Stuart Fleetwood scored a hat-trick with Hereford producing a major upset to win 3–1. In the second round they were once again drawn at home to a Championship club, Leicester City, but were defeated 1–3 to exit the competition.

Win Draw Loss

22 August 2006 First round	Hereford United	3–1	Coventry City	Hereford
19:45 BST	Fleetwood 1', 57', 64'	Report	Whing (yellow card) 39'; Hughes (yellow card) 45+1'; Adebola 59'	Stadium: Edgar Street; Attendance: 3,404; Referee: Lee Probert

19 September 2006 Second round	Hereford United	1–3	Leicester City	Hereford
19:45 BST	Purdie 56' (pen.); McClenahan (red card) 76'; Beckwith (yellow card) 80'	Report	Hammond 27'; Logan (yellow card) 57'; Stearman (yellow card) 57', (goal) 66'; Hume 76' (pen.); Kisnorbo (red card) 89'	Stadium: Edgar Street; Attendance: 4,073; Referee: Richard Beeby

=== Football League Trophy ===
The club entered the competition in the first round and were drawn at home to fierce rivals Shrewsbury Town, like they would be in the first round of the FA Cup a month later.

Win Draw Loss

17 October 2006 First round	Hereford United	1–2	Shrewsbury Town	Hereford
19:45 BST	Williams 79'; Gulliver (yellow card) 82'	Report	Symes 22', 77'; Hogg (yellow card) 90'	Stadium: Edgar Street; Attendance: 2,007; Referee: Kevin Friend

== Squad statistics ==
As of match played 5 May 2007

=== Appearance and goals ===
- The plus (+) symbol denotes an appearance as a substitute, hence 2+1 indicates two appearances in the starting XI and one appearance as a substitute
- Players with zero appearances are not included
- Statistics from the HFA Senior Floodlit Cup are not included

No.	Pos	Nat	Player	Total		League Two		FA Cup		League Cup		FL Trophy	
No.	Pos	Nat	Player	Apps	Goals	Apps	Goals	Apps	Goals	Apps	Goals	Apps	Goals
1	GK	(England) ENG	Wayne Brown	44	0	39	0	4	0	1	0	0	0
2	DF	(England) ENG	Simon Travis	41	0	34+2	0	1+1	0	2	0	1	0
3	MF	(England) ENG	Danny Thomas	15	2	15	2	0	0	0	0	0	0
4	DF	(England) ENG	Richard Rose	39	1	29+4	1	2+1	0	2	0	0+1	0
5	DF	(England) ENG	Tamika Mkandawire	46	2	39	2	4	0	2	0	1	0
6	MF	(England) ENG	Rob Purdie	51	9	43+1	6	4	2	2	1	0+1	0
8	MF	(England) ENG	Andy Ferrell	27	1	15+6	0	4	1	1	0	1	0
9	FW	(England) ENG	Tim Sills	43	2	22+14	2	4	0	2	0	1	0
10	FW	(Wales) WAL	Stuart Fleetwood	32	6	21+6	3	0+2	0	2	3	1	0
12	FW	(England) ENG	Alan Connell	50	10	33+11	9	4	1	0+1	0	1	0
14	GK	(England) ENG	Glyn Thompson	1	0	0	0	0	0	0	0	1	0
16	FW	(England) ENG	Andy Williams	48	8	30+11	7	2+2	0	1+1	0	0+1	1
17	DF	(Wales) WAL	Martyn Giles	15	0	11+2	0	0	0	2	0	0	0
18	DF	(Australia) AUS	Trent McClenahan	30	1	24+2	1	1	0	2	0	1	0
19	FW	(England) ENG	Marcus Palmer	3	0	1+2	0	0	0	0	0	0	0
21	MF	(England) ENG	Luke Webb	25	2	13+8	0	3	2	0	0	1	0
22	MF	(England) ENG	Jordan Fitzpatrick	1	0	0+1	0	0	0	0	0	0	0
23	DF	(England) ENG	Phil Gulliver	31	0	24+2	0	4	0	0	0	1	0
25	MF	(England) ENG	Ben Smith	18	1	18	1	0	0	0	0	0	0
28	DF	(England) ENG	Dean Beckwith	38	0	32	0	3	0	2	0	1	0
31	MF	(England) ENG	Steve Jennings	11	0	11	0	0	0	0	0	0	0
Players who left during the season but made an appearance
3	MF	(England) ENG	Neil MacKenzie	7	0	7	0	0	0	0	0	0	0
7	MF	(England) ENG	Jon Wallis	2	0	0+2	0	0	0	0	0	0	0
11	MF	(England) ENG	Gareth Sheldon	10	1	3+5	1	1+1	0	0	0	0	0
19	MF	(England) ENG	Simon Osborn	1	0	0+1	0	0	0	0	0	0	0
20	DF	(France) FRA	Alex Jeannin	15	1	11+1	1	3	0	0	0	0	0
24	FW	(England) ENG	Steve Guinan	16	7	16	7	0	0	0	0	0	0
30	GK	(England) ENG	Paul Harrison	1	0	0+1	0	0	0	0	0	0	0
31	MF	(England) ENG	John Eustace	8	0	8	0	0	0	0	0	0	0
33	GK	(England) ENG	Scott Tynan	8	0	7	0	0	0	1	0	0	0
