= 2006 Conference National play-off final =

2006 Conference National Play-off Final
- Event: 2005–06 Conference National
| Halifax Town | Hereford United |
| 2 | 3 |
- After extra time
- Date: 20 May 2006
- Venue: Walkers Stadium, Leicester
- Referee: Dean Whitestone (Northumberland)
- Attendance: 15,499

The 2005–06 Conference National play-off final took place on 20 May 2006 and was contested between Halifax Town and Hereford United. It was held at the Walkers Stadium Leicester for the first time, the previous play-off finals having been held at the Britannia Stadium, Stoke. The result promoted Hereford to League Two while Halifax had to remain in the conference.

Over 18,000 spectators attended the match, of which approximately 10,000 were Hereford fans. The match was televised live by Sky and then made available on DVD by Hereford United.

Both clubs no longer exist in the form that contested the final. Halifax Town folded in 2008 and reformed as FC Halifax Town. Hereford United folded in 2014 and reformed as Hereford.

== Route to the final ==
Halifax went into the match having finished fourth in the 2005–06 Conference National with 75 points. They defeated Grays Athletic 5–4 on aggregate in the semi-final. Hereford went into the match having finished second for the third year in succession with 80 points. They had defeated Morecambe 4–3 on aggregate in the semi-final, although the second leg needed extra time to be decided.

== Match ==
=== Summary ===
As early as the 6th minute there was controversy as Hereford captain Tamika Mkandawire handled the ball in his own penalty area, but the offence was not spotted by referee Dean Whitestone. Both teams had shots on target in the first 25 minutes before Halifax took the lead. Hereford had briefly been reduced to 10 men while Rob Purdie received treatment for a cut lip. While he was being treated, Greg Young's cross was not properly cleared and a lucky ricochet fell to Lewis Killeen, who curled a shot into the top corner from outside the area.

Hereford equalized seven minutes later when Mkandawire won possession and found Adam Stansfield on the right wing, before continuing on a decoy run into the Halifax box. Stansfield's cross evaded the Halifax defense and found Andy Williams at the back post, who scored with a diving header. The first half ended with the run of play fairly equal, with Halifax making the better start to the match and Hereford responding after going a goal down.

The second half saw more of the same with both sides having the upper hand at different stages. In the 57th minute Purdie made a run into the Halifax penalty area, and was brought down by Tyrone Thompson. This time the referee had a better view, but again did not give what seemed to be a penalty. It was not until after Halifax brought on John Grant that the deadlock was broken. After a spell of Hereford pressure, with Stansfield in particular having a couple of good chances, Killeen went on a surging run into the Hereford area before crossing to Grant who flicked the ball into the net.

Hereford responded by bringing on Guy Ipoua who equally made an impact on the game. He controlled a flick on by Andy Ferrell, before playing the ball out to Simon Travis on the right. Travis' cross was powerfully headed in by Ipoua, who was unmarked. Neither team had a clear cut chance in the remaining ten minutes and the match went to extra time. By this stage Chris Wilder had used all his substitutions, while Graham Turner still had two available.

Minutes into extra time, Halifax had a goal disallowed for offside and the tempo of the match slowed down as the players got tired. Then in the 109th minute of the match Hereford won a throw in. Substitute Stuart Fleetwood received the ball from Ryan Green but was tackled. The ball ran loose to Green who deftly clipped the ball into the far corner of the goal with his left foot, scoring what was only the fourth senior goal of his career. With eleven minutes to go it looked as if Hereford had done enough for victory. However the drama was not over as Hereford goalkeeper Wayne Brown received a head injury after going for a ball. With all substitutions now made it looked at one stage as though Hereford would need an emergency goalkeeper, and midfielder Ferrell even had a spare goalkeeper's jersey on for a moment. But, after several minutes, Brown recovered and play resumed although there was six minutes of stoppage time added on. Halifax tried everything to equalize, putting centre-back Adam Quinn up front who had a shot destined for the top corner well saved by Brown.

Ultimately though it was Hereford who hung on to win the match, and they regained their Football League status after nine years in the Conference.

=== Details ===
20 May 2006
17:30 BST

| Halifax Town | 2–3 (a.e.t.) | Hereford United |
|---|---|---|
| Killeen 27'; Grant 73' | Report | Williams 34'; Ipoua 80'; Green 109' |

Walkers Stadium, Leicester
Attendance: 15,499
Referee: Dean Whitestone (Northamptonshire)

| GK | 1 | Jon Kennedy |
| DF | 2 | Steve Haslam |
| DF | 5 | Adam Quinn |
| DF | 16 | Greg Young | | (substituted off) 61' |
| DF | 3 | Matt Doughty | | (substituted off) 76' |
| MF | 8 | Martin Foster (c) |
| MF | 19 | Peter Atherton |
| MF | 18 | Tyrone Thompson |
| FW | 26 | Danny Forrest |
| FW | 11 | Ryan Sugden | | (substituted off) 65' |
| FW | 10 | Lewis Killeen |
Substitutes:
| GK | 24 | Lee Butler |
| DF | 4 | Steve Bushell |
| MF | 25 | Brian Smikle | | (substituted on) 76' |
| FW | 15 | Chris Senior | (yellow card) 111' | (substituted on) 90' |
| FW | 20 | John Grant | | (substituted on) 85' |
Manager:
Chris Wilder

| GK | 14 | Wayne Brown |
| DF | 2 | Ryan Green | (yellow card) 109' |
| DF | 5 | Tamika Mkandawire (c) | (yellow card) 76' |
| DF | 28 | Dean Beckwith |
| DF | 20 | Alex Jeannin | (yellow card) 88' |
| MF | 3 | Simon Travis |
| MF | 15 | Craig Stanley | | (substituted off) 90' |
| MF | 11 | Andy Ferrell |
| MF | 21 | Rob Purdie |
| FW | 16 | Andy Williams | | (substituted off) 75' |
| FW | 9 | Adam Stansfield | | (substituted off) 94' |
Substitutes:
| GK | 1 | Craig Mawson |
| MF | 8 | Jamie Pitman | | (substituted on) 90' |
| FW | 18 | Danny Carey-Bertram |
| FW | 7 | Stuart Fleetwood | | (substituted on) 94' |
| FW | 10 | Guy Ipoua | (yellow card) 110' | (substituted on) 75' |
Manager:
Graham Turner

Match rules:

- 90 minutes.
- 30 minutes of extra time if necessary.
- Penalty shoot-out if scores still level.
- Five named substitutes
- Maximum of three substitutions.

== Post-match ==
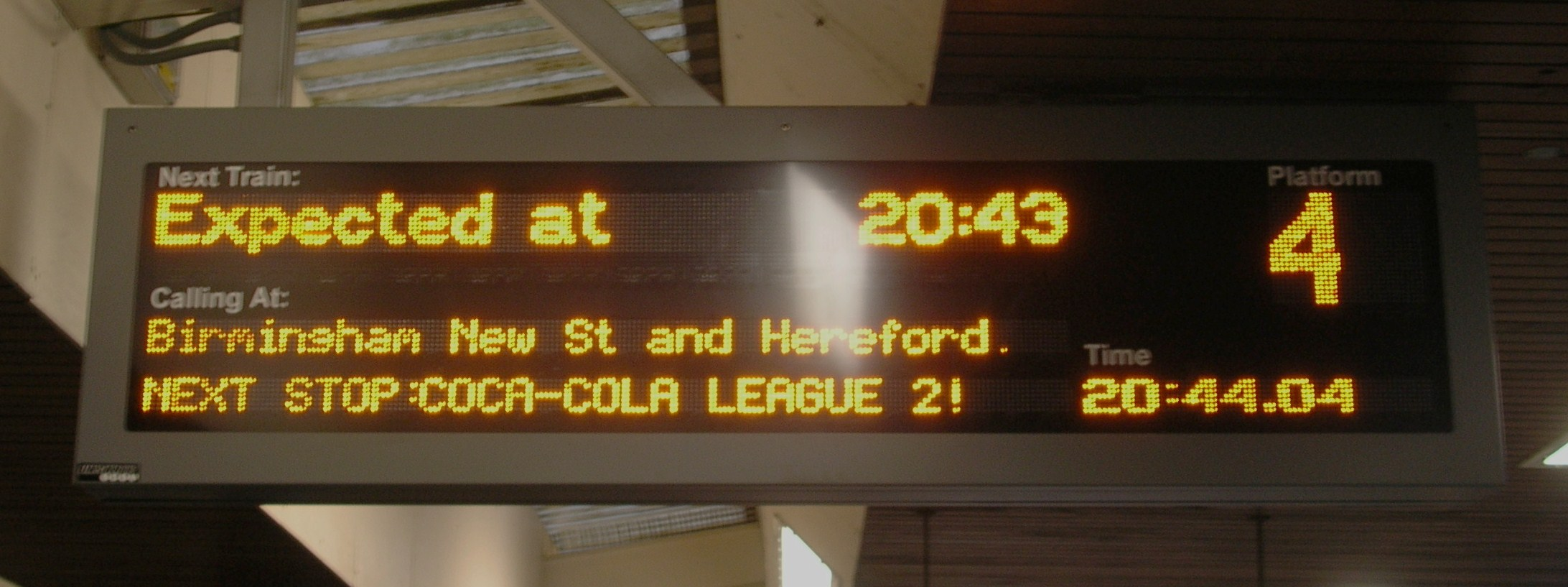
A sign at Leicester railway station commemorating Hereford's victory

Hereford went on to gain a further promotion from League Two, just two seasons later. Halifax's future however was a different story. With continuing financial problems off the pitch Halifax struggled to maintain form in the 2006–7 season and only avoided relegation from the Conference on the last day of the season. Chris Wilder found himself again in a relegation battle in 2007-8 after the team were docked 10 points when they were placed into administration by a local consortium trying to buy the club. Halifax again survived relegation on the last day of the season, only to find out later that they would be relegated anyway due to the consortium failing to meet the creditors' demands to bring the club out of administration. At a meeting of the Football Association, discussing the make-up of the football pyramid for the 2008–09 season, Halifax Town were not placed in either the Football Conference, the Conference North or the Northern Premier League Premier Division. Though the club appealed against the decision to remove them from the Football Conference, they were unsuccessful and the club was wound up.

Hereford were relegated after one season in League One, and were subsequently relegated from the Football League for the second time in their history in 2011–12. They did not last much longer, being expelled from the Conference in 2013–14 for financial irregularities, having initially survived relegation. Gross mismanagement led to the club folding the following season with their results being expunged from the 2014–15 Southern League Premier Division.
