= Jeannin =

Jeannin is a French surname. Notable people with the surname include:

- Alex Jeannin (born 1977), French footballer
- Pierre Jeannin (1540–1622), French politician and diplomat
- Sandy Jeannin (born 1976), Swiss ice hockey player
