= Jon Wallis =

English footballer

Personal information
- Full name: Jonathan Kevin Wallis
- Date of birth: 4 April 1986 (age 40)
- Place of birth: Gravesend, England
- Positions: Central midfielder; right back

Youth career
- ?–2004: Gillingham

Senior career*
Years	Team	Apps	(Gls)
2004–2006	Gillingham	17	(0)
2004	→ Hastings United (loan)	11	(2)
2005	→ Hastings United (loan)	6	(1)
2006–2007	Hereford United	2	(0)
2006	→ Dover Athletic (loan)	12	(1)
2007	→ Dagenham & Redbridge (loan)	2	(0)
2007–2011	Dover Athletic	125	(20)
2011–2013	Dartford	62	(5)
- * Club domestic league appearances and goals as of 18:35, 22 April 2013 (UTC)

Jonathan Kevin Wallis (born 4 April 1986) is an English footballer.

== Career ==
He progressed through the youth ranks at Gillingham and signed his first professional contract, at the beginning of the 2005–06 season. Prior to this he had spent three months work experience at Hastings United where he made 14 appearances in all competitions, scoring four goals. Two of these goals were in the preliminary rounds of the FA Cup. He returned to the Pilot Field in September 2005 on a month's loan. Back at Gillingham, Wallis had been a mainstay in the youth and reserve teams and it was following some strong performances in the reserve team that Neale Cooper decided to hand Wallis his debut.

Although normally a central midfielder, Wallis made his debut at right back in the Football League Trophy match at home to Crawley Town. Gillingham won 2–0 that night in a game that went to extra time and Wallis played exceptionally well in an unfamiliar position. In particular, Wallis showed a willingness to get forward to support the attack, and was involved in the thick of the action when he cleared a goal-bound effort during normal time.

Wallis went on to make around twenty performances in the 2005–06 season, almost entirely at right-back, however on 9 May 2006 he was released by Gillingham. A few weeks later he signed for Hereford United. However, he made only two substitute appearances for the Bulls.

On 28 October 2006, he went on loan to Dover as midfield cover, making 12 appearances and scoring his first goal of the season in the 4–0 win over Ashford Town. On 19 February 2007 he went out on loan again, this time to Dagenham & Redbridge, making two substitute appearances.

On 27 March 2007, he left Hereford by mutual consent and subsequently signed for Dover Athletic until the end of the season.

Andy Hessenthaler was appointed Dover Athletic manager in June 2007, and Wallis turned down a Football League club in order to spend at least another year at the Kent club to develop his game under the former Gillingham manager.

After Dover Athletic won the Isthmian League Division One South title, Wallis opted to sign a new one-year deal in May 2008. The following season saw more success for the Kent club as they won the Isthmian League Premier Division at the first time of asking, which prompted Wallis to sign another new contract for Dover Athletic.

Wallis joined Conference South side Dartford in 2011 after a falling-out of a number of players with then Dover manager Martin Hayes.

== Career statistics ==
Club statistics
Club	Season	League			FA Cup		League Cup		Other		Total	
Club	Season	Division	Apps	Goals	Apps	Goals	Apps	Goals	Apps	Goals	Apps	Goals
Gillingham	2004–05	Championship	0	0	0	0	0	0	—		0	0
Gillingham	2005–06	League One	17	0	1	0	1	0	1 (Note: Appearance in Football League Trophy)	0	20	0
Gillingham	Total		17	0	1	0	1	0	1	0	20	0
Hastings United (loan)	2004–05	Isthmian Division One	11	2	0	0	—		0	0	11	2
Hastings United (loan)	2005–06	Isthmian Division One	6	1	0	0	—		0	0	6	1
Hastings United (loan)	Total		17	3	0	0	—		0	0	17	3
Hereford United	2006–07	League Two	2	0	0	0	0	0	0	0	2	0
Dover Athletic (loan)	2006–07	Isthmian Division One South	12	1	0	0	—		1 (Note: Appearance in Isthmian League Cup)	0	13	1
Dagenham & Redbridge (loan)	2006–07	Conference National	2	0	0	0	—		0	0	2	0
Dover Athletic	2007–08	Isthmian Division One South	41	8	3	0	—		5 (Note: Appearances in FA Trophy)	0	49	8
Dover Athletic	2008–09	Isthmian Premier Division	30	7	1	1	—		1 (Note: Appearance in Kent Senior Cup)	0	32	8
Dover Athletic	2009–10	Conference South	26	4	2	3	—		3	1	31	8
Dover Athletic	2010–11	Conference South	28	1	6	1	—		1	0	35	2
Dover Athletic	Total		125	20	12	5	—		10	1	147	26
Dartford	2011–12	Conference South	29	2	1	0	—		7 (Note: Five appearances in FA Trophy, two in Kent Senior Cup)	0	37	2
Dartford	2012–13	Conference Premier	33	3	1	0	—		6 (Note: Five appearances in FA Trophy, one appearance and one goal in Kent Senior Cup)	1	40	4
Dartford	Total		62	5	2	0	—		13	1	77	6
Career total			237	29	15	5	1	0	25	2	278	36
