= Alan Connell =

English footballer and coach

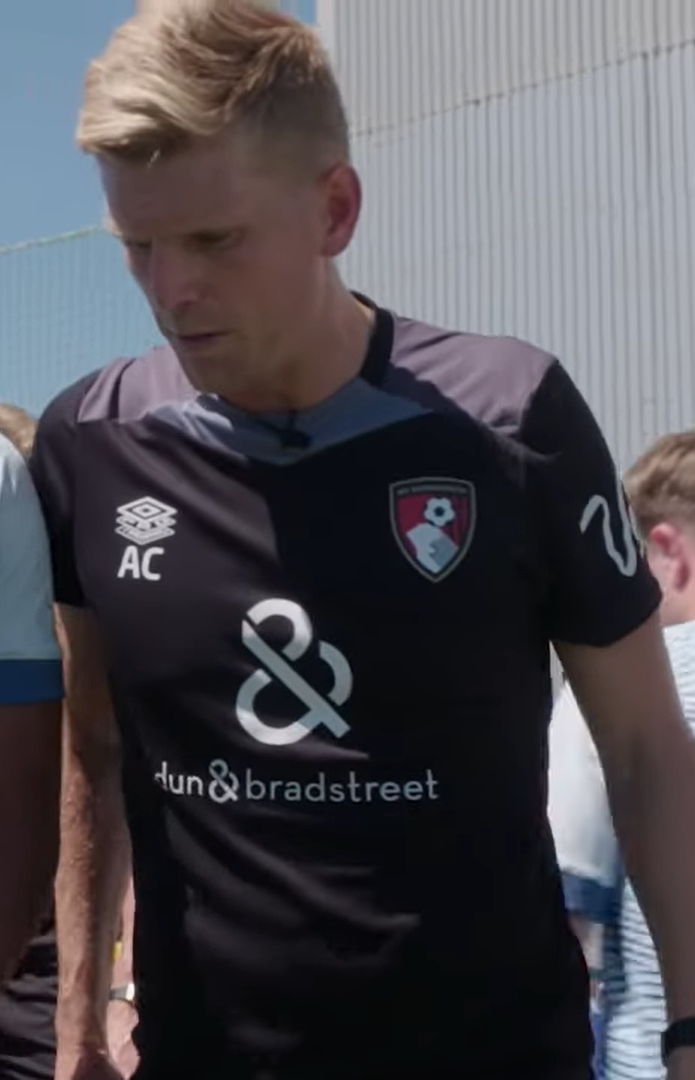
- Connell as the youth team coach at Bournemouth in 2024

Personal information
- Full name: Alan John Connell
- Date of birth: 5 February 1983 (age 43)
- Place of birth: Enfield, England
- Height: 5 ft 11 in (1.80 m)
- Position: Forward

Team information
- Current team: Bournemouth (youth team coach)

Youth career
- 1999–2001: Tottenham Hotspur

Senior career*
Years	Team	Apps	(Gls)
2001–2002	Ipswich Town	0	(0)
2002–2005	Bournemouth	54	(8)
2005–2006	Torquay United	22	(7)
2006–2007	Hereford United	44	(9)
2007–2008	Brentford	44	(12)
2008–2010	Bournemouth	50	(5)
2010–2011	Grimsby Town	46	(25)
2011–2012	Swindon Town	32	(11)
2012–2014	Bradford City	43	(8)
2014	Northampton Town	16	(0)
2014	Grimsby Town	3	(0)
2014–2015	Havant & Waterlooville	13	(0)
2015–2016	Poole Town	22	(2)
Total		389	(87)
- * Club domestic league appearances and goals

Alan John Connell (born 5 February 1983) is an English former professional footballer and current youth team coach at Bournemouth.

As a player, he was a striker who played between 2001 and 2016. Connell came through the youth academy at Tottenham Hotspur but received his first professional contract from Ipswich Town, despite this he failed to make an appearance and joined Bournemouth in 2002 where despite making over 50 league appearances he was largely used as a back-up striker. This prompted him to move to Torquay United in 2005 after three years with Bournemouth. A year later he moved on again to Hereford United before re-signing for Bournemouth in 2008. In his second season back with the club he helped them to a 2nd-place finish in League Two thus securing promotion to League One. In the summer of 2010 he signed for Conference National side Grimsby Town where he scored 25 league goals in 46 appearances, this earned him the "Supporters Player of the Season" and eventually a move to Swindon Town where he again won promotion from League Two. After a year with Swindon he moved once again, signing with Bradford City. He has since had short stints with Northampton Town and former club, Grimsby Town. He finished his career in Non League playing for both Havant & Waterlooville and Poole Town.

== Career ==
=== Ipswich Town ===
Born in Enfield, Connell was a trainee at Tottenham Hotspur as a youngster but soon transferred to George Burley's Ipswich Town in 2001. Connell failed to win a call into a first team squad and was released in the summer of 2002.

=== Bournemouth ===
Connell then transferred to Bournemouth after a successful trial period at the end of the 2001–02 season. Alan was handed his professional debut by Sean O'Driscoll on 13 August 2002 in the club's 0–0 home draw with Kidderminster Harriers. He would go on to score 7 goals in 14 games before he suffered a cruciate ligament injury in October 2002 in a match against Leyton Orient which ruled him out for the remainder of his first season. By the end of the season Bournemouth had earned promotion from Division Three via a play-off final victory over Lincoln City at the Millennium Stadium in Cardiff. During the 2003–04 season, Connell would only feature 7 times for The Cherries. His final season at Bournemouth was also thwarted by a foot injury. In all, 42 of his 61 appearances for the Cherries were from the substitutes' bench and he scored 11 goals.

=== Torquay United ===
He moved to Torquay United in the summer of 2005 for a fee of £5,000, making his debut in the 0–0 draw against Notts County on the opening day of the 2005–06 season. However, he failed to secure a regular first-team place and Bournemouth even tried to sign him back on loan in March 2006. By the end of the season Torquay had narrowly avoided relegation from the Football League and Connell would eventually leave the club after making 26 appearances in all competitions, scoring 7 goals.

=== Hereford United ===
In the summer of 2006 he signed for newly promoted Conference National play-off champions Hereford United in July 2006. After initially being restricted to substitute appearances, Connell broke into the starting eleven and went on to become the top goalscorer at the club, despite not always playing in his favoured role as a striker. In the second half of the season, he was usually named in the starting XI as other strikers at the club were rotated. He was named Player of the Month for October. He finished the season on 51 appearances in all competitions scoring 10 goals.

=== Brentford ===
Connell turned down Hereford's offer of a new contract and instead signed for Brentford on 2 July 2007. He remained at Griffin Park for only one season and departed a year later. However, in this season he was hugely influential and made regular starting appearances. He started well again the next season but was moved down the pecking order by new signing Charlie Macdonald. Playing most of his 44 games in one season he was a huge hit with the fans and helped keep Brentford aloft in a tricky first season down from League 1.

=== Return to Bournemouth ===
On 29 August 2008 Bournemouth re-signed Connell for an undisclosed fee. The club who had recently been relegated back into Football League Two were also handed a point deduction for financial irregularities. Connell and Bournemouth secured their Football League status and prevented a second successive relegation when they beat relegation rivals Grimsby Town 2–1 at home on the penultimate day of the 2008–09 season. Other results had meant Grimsby also avoided the drop. During the 2009–10 season despite a transfer embargo being placed on the club, Bournemouth surged home to finish 2nd in the League and earn promotion back to Football League One with Connell scoring the goal that secured promotion, away to Burton in the last away game of the season. Connell made 60 appearances, scoring 8 goals during his second spell with the club.

=== Grimsby Town ===
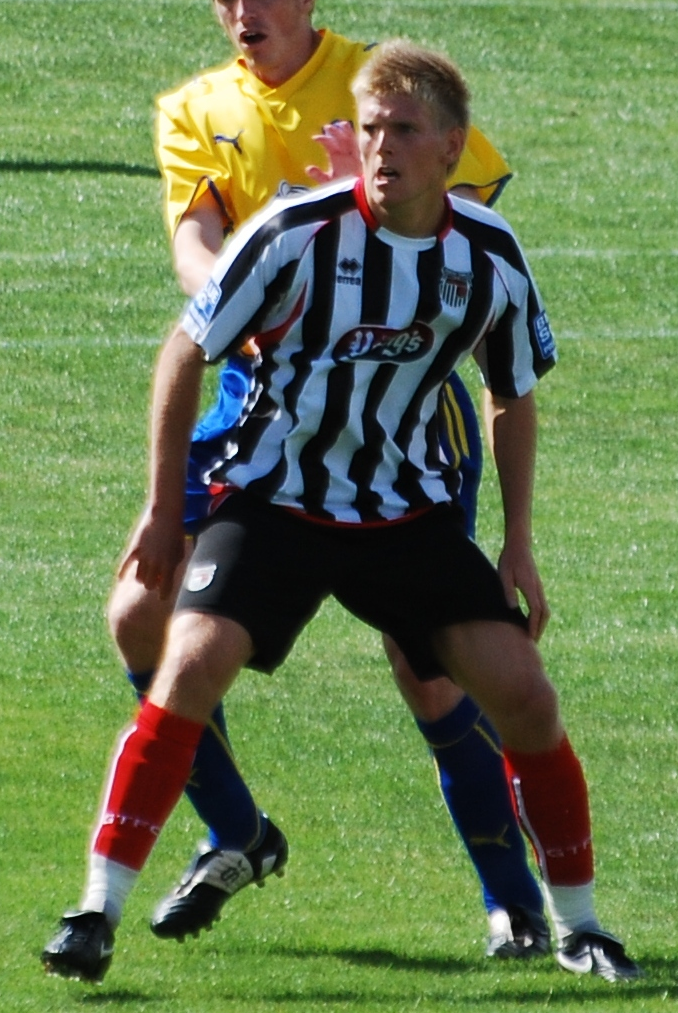
Connell playing for Grimsby Town in 2010

In July 2010, he moved to Conference National side Grimsby Town. The club had suffered relegation in the previous season from League Two, whilst Connell and former club Bournemouth had earned promotion. On 17 July 2010 Alan scored on his home debut for Town in a 2–1 friendly win over Sheffield Wednesday. He then made his league debut on 14 August 2010 in a 1–0 win against Crawley Town and scored his first league goal in the 2–1 home defeat against Hayes & Yeading. Connell went on to score 14 goals in his opening 19 appearances for The Mariners doubling the total of the previous season's top goalscorer Peter Sweeney and doing so in little over two months into the season, prompting club chairman John Fenty to state in a fans forum that the club would be aiming to keep Connell and not cash in on the forward in the January transfer window. On 1 January 2011 Connell scored two free kicks which were his 18th and 19th goals of the season during Grimsby's 7–2 victory over Mansfield Town.

On Saturday 30 April 2011, Connell scored his 29th goal of the season in all competitions against AFC Wimbledon – Grimsby's final game of the 2010–11 season. He received several player of the year trophies at the club's annual awards night. On 24 June 2011 Grimsby joint-manager Paul Hurst revealed the club had received a number of offers for the player, one from a Football League One club, another from a Football League Two side and a third bid from a fellow Conference National side, all of which were dismissed haven been described as "derisory".

On 7 July 2011 amongst speculation of Connell's future at Grimsby, chairman John Fenty stated that the player was not for sale and also mentioned he had received an official bid from fellow Conference National side Luton Town that he described also as "derisory", and on 13 July 2011 Fenty commented that Connell would definitely not be sold to another club in Grimsby's division, mentioning that the player is happy at Grimsby.

=== Swindon Town ===
Connell signed for Swindon Town on 15 July 2011, for an undisclosed six-figure sum, thought to be in the region of £115,000. He scored his first and second goals for the club on 3 September 2011, helping his team to a 3–2 win over Rotherham United.

=== Bradford City ===
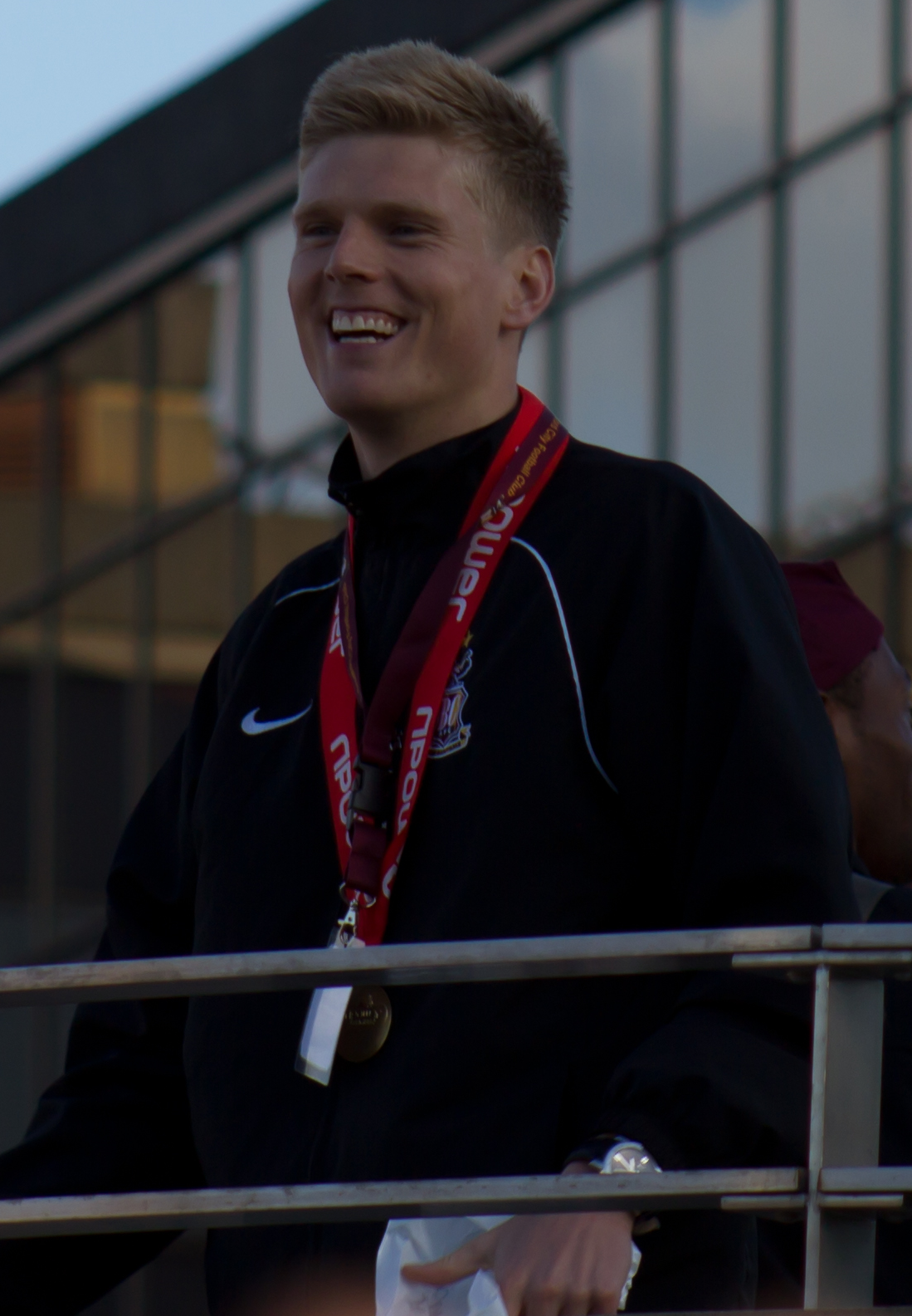
Connell with the victory parade that followed Bradford City's victory in the 2013 Football League Two play-off final

On 20 July 2012, Connell joined Bradford City on a two-year contract. He made his debut on 11 August in the League Cup during a 1–0 win against Notts County. He made his league debut a week later against Gillingham. He made his home debut on 25 August, coming on as a substitute for Nahki Wells during a 5–1 win against AFC Wimbledon. He scored his first goal for the club on 8 September, coming off the bench to score in a 1–1 draw against Accrington Stanley. He scored again in the following game, a 3–0 win against Barnet at Valley Parade.

=== Northampton Town ===
On 30 January 2014, Connell joined Northampton Town on contract until the end of the 2013–14 season, turning down former club Grimsby Town after being in advanced talks to re-sign for The Mariners.

=== Return to Grimsby Town ===
Connell was released at the end of the season and joined Dagenham & Redbridge on trial, scoring on his debut in a friendly against Bromley. One day before the start of the 2014–15 season, Connell signed a short-term deal with former club Grimsby Town and played in the club's opening day 0–0 draw away at Bristol Rovers. Having failed to make an impact in the opening three fixtures of the season, Connell lost his place in the team to Jon-Paul Pittman and on 28 August 2014 he was released by the club on mutual consent only three weeks after re-joining the club.

=== Havant & Waterlooville ===
On 6 September 2014, Connell joined Conference South side Havant & Waterlooville.

== Career statistics ==
Appearances and goals by club, season and competition
Club	Season	League			FA Cup		League Cup		Other		Total	
Club	Season	Division	Apps	Goals	Apps	Goals	Apps	Goals	Apps	Goals	Apps	Goals
Bournemouth	2002–03	Third Division	13	6	0	0	1	1	0	0	14	7
Bournemouth	2003–04	Second Division	7	0	0	0	0	0	0	0	7	0
Bournemouth	2004–05	League One	34	2	5	2	3	0	1 (Note: Appearance(s) in Football League Trophy)	0	43	4
Bournemouth	Total		54	8	5	2	4	1	1	0	64	11
Torquay United	2005–06	League Two	22	7	2	0	1	0	1	0	26	7
Hereford United	2006–07	League Two	44	9	4	1	1	0	1	0	50	10
Brentford	2007–08	League Two	42	12	1	0	1	0	1	0	45	12
Brentford	2008–09	League Two	2	0	—		0	0	0	0	2	0
Brentford	Total		44	12	1	0	1	0	1	0	47	12
AFC Bournemouth	2008–09	League Two	12	0	1	0	0	0	0	0	13	0
AFC Bournemouth	2009–10	League Two	38	5	2	2	0	0	2	1	42	8
AFC Bournemouth	Total		50	5	3	2	0	0	2	1	55	8
Grimsby Town	2010–11	Conference Premier	46	25	2	1	—		2 (Note: Appearances in FA Trophy)	3	50	29
Swindon Town	2011–12	League Two	32	11	4	1	2	0	6	1	44	13
Bradford City	2012–13	League Two	30	8	4	1	5	0	5 (Note: 3 appearances in Football League Trophy, 2 appearances in League Two play-offs)	0	44	9
Bradford City	2013–14	League One	13	0	0	0	1	0	1	0	15	0
Bradford City	Total		43	8	4	1	6	0	6	0	59	9
Northampton Town	2013–14	League Two	16	0	0	0	—		—		16	0
Grimsby Town	2014–15	Conference Premier	3	0	—		—		—		3	0
Grimsby Town	Grimsby Town total		49	25	2	1	—		2	3	53	29
Havant & Waterlooville	2014–15	Conference South	12	0	4	0	—		3 (Note: 2 appearances in FA Trophy, 1 appearance in Hampshire Senior Cup)	0	19	0
Career total			366	85	29	8	15	1	23	5	431	99

== Honours ==
AFC Bournemouth

- Football League Third Division play-offs: 2003

Swindon Town

- Football League Two: 2011–12
- Football League Trophy runner-up: 2011–12

Bradford City

- Football League Two play-offs: 2013
- Football League Cup runner-up: 2012–13

Poole Town

- Southern Football League Premier Division: 2015–16

Individual

- Grimsby Town Player of the Year: 2010–11
