= Andy Ferrell =

British footballer (born 1984)

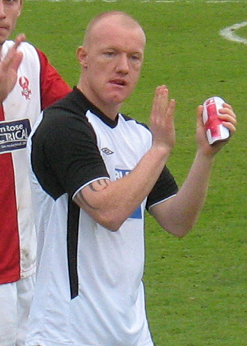
- Ferrell in 2009

Personal information
- Full name: Andrew Eric Ferrell
- Date of birth: 9 January 1984 (age 42)
- Place of birth: Newcastle upon Tyne, England
- Height: 5 ft 8 in (1.73 m)
- Position: Midfielder

Youth career
- ?–2004: Newcastle United

Senior career*
Years	Team	Apps	(Gls)
2004–2005	Watford	0	(0)
2005–2007	Hereford United	52	(2)
2007	→ Kidderminster Harriers (loan)	1	(0)
2007–2009	Kidderminster Harriers	69	(2)
2009–2010	York City	22	(1)
2010–2011	Gateshead	36	(3)
2011	→ Barrow (loan)	8	(2)
2011–2012	Barrow	15	(0)
2012	→ Blyth Spartans (loan)	7	(1)
2012–2013	Bedlington Terriers		
2014–2015	Ashington		
2015	Whitley Bay		
2015–2016	Bedlington Terriers		

Managerial career
- 2015–2016: Bedlington Terriers
- * Club domestic league appearances and goals as of 15:00, 11 July 2012 (UTC)

Andrew Eric Ferrell (born 9 January 1984) is an English footballer. He played in League Two for Hereford United during the 2006–07 season.

== Career ==
Born in Newcastle upon Tyne, Tyne and Wear, Ferrell began his career as a trainee in the youth system at hometown club Newcastle United, before signing a professional contract on 5 December 2002. He was released at the end of the 2003–04 season without making an appearance for the first team although he had impressed for the reserve team, scoring 11 goals in 21 starts. He signed a one-year contract with Watford on 7 July 2004, where he made two appearances in the League Cup in the 2004–05 season, scoring the winning goal in the first round against Cambridge United. He made no other appearances for Watford and left the club at the end of the season when his contract was not renewed.

After trials at Darlington, Forest Green Rovers and Hereford United, Ferrell signed for Conference National outfit Hereford on 9 August 2005. In his first season with the club, he was a regular in central midfield, making 38 appearances and scoring two goals in all competitions as Hereford reached the 2006 Conference National play-off final and won promotion to League Two in May 2006. He signed a new one-year contract in April 2006 to keep him at Hereford for the 2006–07 season. In his second season with the club, he was in and out of the starting XI, making 27 league and cup appearances, but scored in the 4–0 win over League One side Port Vale in the FA Cup.

With the return of Ben Smith, his first team opportunities were limited and he was loaned to Conference National team Kidderminster Harriers in March 2007 for the remainder of the 2006–07 season. However, he picked up a groin injury in his first game, which ended his season prematurely. He was released at the end of the season and subsequently signed for Kidderminster on a permanent contract. He made 42 league and cup appearances for Kidderminster in the 2007–08 season and signed a new one-year contract in May 2008.

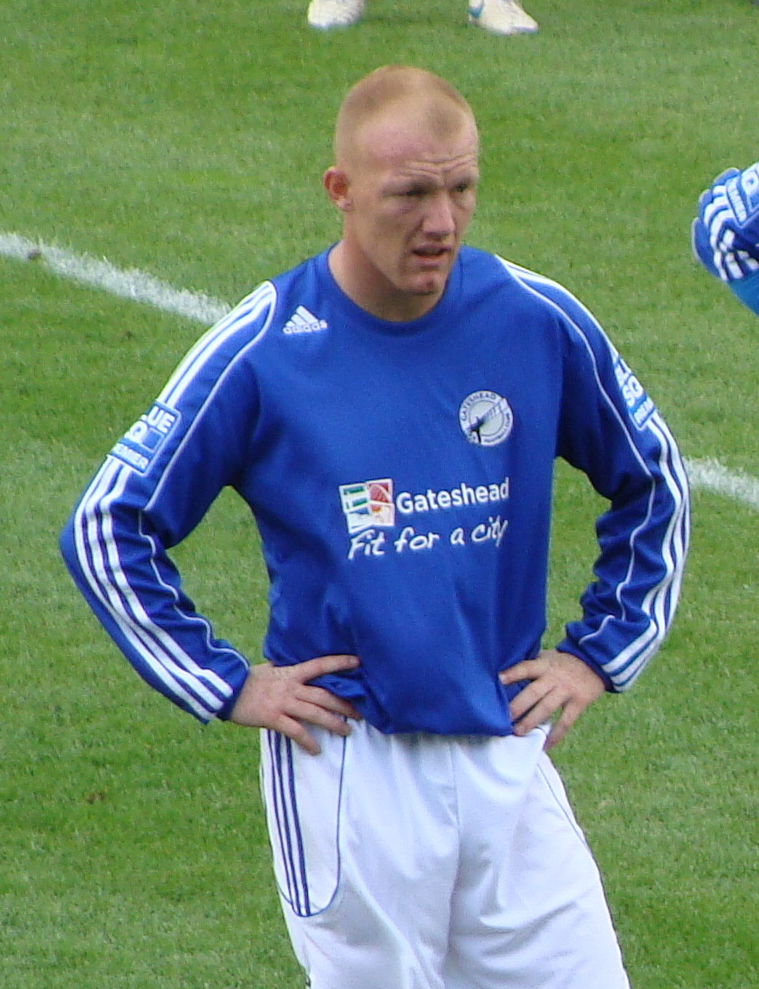
Ferrell playing for Gateshead in 2010

He signed for fellow Conference Premier team York City on 19 May 2009. He made his debut in a 2–1 defeat to Oxford United on 8 August. He scored for York in a 3–2 victory over Tamworth with a shot from outside the penalty area. He scored a penalty kick to give York a 1–0 victory over Corby Town in the FA Trophy third round, which proved to be his final appearance for the club after signing a one-and-a-half-year contract for Gateshead on 1 February 2010 for a fee of £3,500, making his debut on 6 February against Mansfield Town. Ferrell scored his first goal for Gateshead on 9 October in a 3–1 home victory against Tamworth. Having failed to affirm his place in the team he was transfer listed by Gateshead on 20 January 2011.

On 1 March it was announced that Ferrell would join Barrow on a one-month loan on 3 March, after playing for Gateshead reserves in the Durham Challenge Cup the previous day. He made his debut for Barrow on 5 March in a 0–0 draw with York. He scored his first goal for Barrow on 15 March in a 4–2 win away at Southport. Ferrell was released by Gateshead on 4 May 2011 and signed a one-year contract with former club Barrow on 22 June. He joined Conference North side Blyth Spartans on a one-month loan on 12 March 2012. Ferrell scored on his debut for Blyth the following day in a 3–3 draw away at Droylsden, and went on to play seven times for the Northumberland club during his loan spell.

Ferrell signed for Northern League Division One side Bedlington Terriers on 10 July 2012. However, he was arrested in September 2012, and in June 2013 he was sentenced to 4 years in prison for his part in a major drug-dealing gang He served two years before being released.

He subsequently signed for Ashington in September 2014, before joining Whitley Bay in March 2015. He was appointed manager of Bedlington in May 2015 and was relieved of his duties in September 2016 after overseeing relegation in his first season.

== Style of play ==
Ferrell is able to play as a central midfielder or left midfielder and his play has been described as being combative.

== Personal life ==
Ferrell was charged with conspiracy to supply class A and B drugs and was jailed for four years in June 2013. He claimed he got involved in the supply of drugs to fund his gambling addiction. In March 2023 he, along with three other men, was convicted of public order offences and banned from attending any regulated football match in the UK for three years, following disorder before a Newcastle United match against Chelsea on 12 November 2022.

== Career statistics ==
As of 18 February 2012

Appearances and goals by club, season and competition
Club	Season	League (Note: The "League" column constitutes appearances and goals in the Football League and Football Conference.)		FA Cup		League Cup		Other (Note: The "Other" column constitutes appearances and goals in the Conference League Cup, FA Trophy, Football League Trophy and play-offs.)		Total	
Club	Season	Apps	Goals	Apps	Goals	Apps	Goals	Apps	Goals	Apps	Goals
Watford	2004–05	0	0	0	0	2	1	0	0	2	1
Hereford United	2005–06	31	2	0	0	–		7	0	38	2
Hereford United	2006–07	21	0	4	1	1	0	1	0	27	1
Hereford United	Total	52	2	4	1	1	0	8	0	65	3
Kidderminster Harriers (loan)	2006–07	1	0	0	0	–		0	0	1	0
Kidderminster Harriers	2007–08	38	1	2	0	–		2	0	42	1
Kidderminster Harriers	2008–09	31	1	3	0	–		1	0	35	1
Kidderminster Harriers	Total	70	2	5	0	–		3	0	78	2
York City	2009–10	22	1	3	0	–		4	1	29	2
Gateshead	2009–10	16	0	0	0	–		0	0	16	0
Gateshead	2010–11	20	3	2	0	–		2	0	24	3
Gateshead	Total	36	3	2	0	–		2	0	40	3
Barrow (loan)	2010–11	8	2	0	0	–		0	0	8	2
Barrow	2011–12	15	0	1	0	–		2	0	18	0
Barrow	Total	23	2	1	0	–		2	0	26	2
Blyth Spartans (loan)	2011–12	7	1	0	0	–		0	0	7	1
Career total		210	11	15	1	3	1	19	1	247	14

== Honours ==
Hereford United

- Conference National play-offs: 2005–06
