= 2004–05 Gillingham F.C. season =

English football club season

Gillingham
2004–05 season
- Chairman: Paul Scally
- Manager: Andy Hessenthaler (until 23 November) multiple caretaker managers (23 November – 7 December); Stan Ternent (from 7 December)
- Championship: 22nd
- FA Cup: Third round
- League Cup: First round
- Top goalscorer: League: Darius Henderson (9); All: Darius Henderson (9)
- Highest home attendance: 10,810 (v. Cardiff City, 30 April 2005)
- Lowest home attendance: 3,108 (v. Northampton Town, 24 August 2004)
Home colours	Away colours

During the 2004–05 English football season, Gillingham F.C. competed in the Football League Championship, the second tier of the English football league system. It was the 73rd season in which Gillingham competed in the Football League and the 55th since the club was voted back into the league in 1950. It was Gillingham's fifth consecutive season in the second tier of the English league system, to which the club had gained promotion for the first time in 2000.

Gillingham began the season with two victories in their first three games, but results rapidly declined thereafter. Between early September and late November, the team won only once in 14 games, leaving them in 23rd place in the 24-team league table. After a 4–1 defeat to Crewe Alexandra on 20 November, Andy Hessenthaler resigned as the team's manager, a position he had held since 2000. Stan Ternent took over as manager in early December and results improved slightly, but at the end of 2004 the team were still within the bottom three places which at the end of the season would result in relegation to the third tier of English football. In the last 15 games of the season, Gillingham only lost twice, but the run included 9 draws. Going into the final game of the season, Gillingham were in 21st place in the table and could still be relegated. A 2–2 draw against Nottingham Forest, combined with the results of two other games, meant that Gillingham finished in 22nd place and were relegated, ending a five-season spell in the second tier.

The club also competed in two knock-out tournaments, but in both the FA Cup and the Football League Cup they were eliminated at the earliest possible stage. Gillingham played 48 competitive matches, winning 12, drawing 14, and losing 22. Darius Henderson was the team's top goalscorer with 9 goals. Paul Smith made the most appearances, playing 43 times. The highest attendance recorded at the club's home ground, Priestfield Stadium, was 10,810 for the final home game of the season against Cardiff City.

== Background and pre-season ==
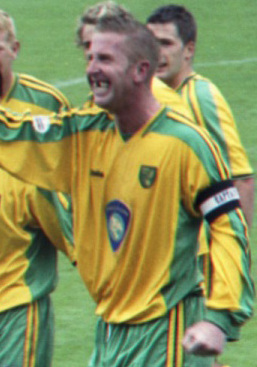
Iwan Roberts (pictured in 2004) joined Gillingham as a player-coach.

The 2004–05 season was Gillingham's 73rd season playing in the Football League and the 55th since the club was elected back into the League in 1950 after being voted out in 1938. In the 1999–2000 season, Gillingham beat Wigan Athletic in the Second Division play-off final to reach the second tier of the English football league system for the first time in the club's history. In the team's first three seasons at this level, they finished in mid-table, ending the season in 13th place out of 24 teams in the 2000–01 season, 12th in 2001–02, and 11th in 2002–03. In the 2003–04 season, they finished in 21st place, level on points with 22nd-placed Walsall, avoiding relegation to the third tier only because their goal difference of −19 was one better than Walsall's −20.

At the start of the 2004–05 season, Andy Hessenthaler was the team's player-manager, a position he had held since 2000. Wayne Jones retained his position of first-team coach from the previous season, and he was joined by a second coach as the club signed Iwan Roberts, a veteran forward who had been released by Norwich City after seven seasons, to a player-coach position. Gillingham further boosted their attacking options by signing another forward, Darren Byfield, who had last played for Sunderland. Rod Wallace, a forward who had spent two injury-hit seasons with Gillingham, was released by the club and left professional football altogether. After playing in a blue and black kit during the previous season, the club switched to blue shirts with white sleeves, blue shorts, and blue socks. The change kit, to be worn in those away games where there was a clash of colours with the home team, was all yellow.

Before the new season, the second tier of English football, previously called the Football League First Division, was renamed the Football League Championship. Previewing the season, The Sunday Telegraph reported that a leading bookmaker gave Gillingham odds of 200/1 of becoming champions of the division, the longest of any team; the newspaper noted that Gillingham "face[d] a hard season" but that they might "hang on to live another day". Writing in the matchday programme for the first home game of the season, Hessenthaler said "we've already been told by one paper that we are going to finish 23rd [...] we have proved them all wrong over the last four years and we'll do it again this year".

== Football League Championship ==
=== August–December ===
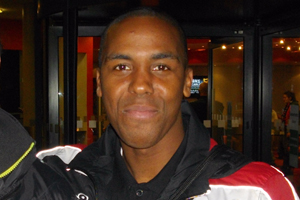
Darren Byfield (pictured in 2011) scored twice in the first three games of the season.

Gillingham's first match of the season was away to Ipswich Town; both Byfield and Roberts made their debuts. Midway through the first half, Byfield passed the ball to Paul Smith, the team's captain, who scored Gillingham's first goal of the campaign, but Ipswich scored twice to win the game. Hessenthaler described both the goals which his team had conceded as "sloppy". Gillingham's first game of the season at their home ground, Priestfield Stadium, was against Leeds United, who had been relegated from the top-tier FA Premier League at the end of the previous season after 14 years at the highest level of English football. The attendance of 10,739 was the largest for a game at the stadium since the previous September. Byfield scored a goal within the first five minutes and Roberts added a second; Leeds scored in the second half but Gillingham held on for a 2–1 victory. Hessenthaler told the press "For endeavour, desire and commitment I thought we were tremendous. If we do that every game we won't be in the bottom three like everyone expects us to be this season." Four days later, the same two players scored in another 2–1 victory over Preston North End; Mark Saunders suffered a broken leg and would not play again during the season. After losing to Stoke City and Queens Park Rangers without scoring a goal in either game, Gillingham finished August with a 2–1 victory over Burnley, in which Roberts and Byfield once again scored the goals, leaving them 10th in the Championship league table.

Gillingham's first match of September ended in a 4–0 defeat to Sunderland at Priestfield; Hessenthaler was again critical of his team, telling the press "It was schoolboy defending for their goals and that's not acceptable." Patrick Agyemang scored twice to secure a 2–2 draw away to Coventry City on 15 September, but Gillingham lost their next seven games. The run began with a 3–1 defeat away to Reading; Dave Kitson, whom Gillingham had tried unsuccessfully to sign during the previous season, scored a hat-trick for Reading in the first half of the game. Gillingham lost home games to Brighton & Hove Albion and Leicester City without scoring a goal and finished September in 20th place in the league table, one point above the bottom three positions which would result in relegation to League One at the end of the season. Darius Henderson, a forward who had joined Gillingham in January but suffered a serious injury in only his sixth game for the team, played for the first time since March in the defeat to Leicester. Roberts was absent from the team for the whole of October; three of the games he missed were the result of a suspension issued by the Football Association, the governing body of the sport in England, after the publication of an autobiography in which he contended that he had deliberately injured an opposing player during his time at Norwich. When he returned, he was unable to regain his place in the starting line-up and was used almost exclusively as a substitute. Henderson scored his first goal of the season to give Gillingham the lead over Plymouth Argyle on 2 October, but Plymouth scored twice in the final minute of the game to win 2–1. On 17 October, Sheffield United had what BBC Sport called a "comfortable win" over Gillingham at Priestfield; Paul Shaw, who had left Gillingham during the previous season, scored twice against his former club in a 3–1 victory. Gillingham followed this with two defeats away from home, 3–1 to Millwall and 2–1 to West Ham United, after which they were in 23rd place in the table. Mark Hodgkinson of The Daily Telegraph wrote that in the game against West Ham, Gillingham were "so short of self-belief that they were delighted at conceding just the three goals".

Although Gillingham ended their losing run with a 1–0 victory at home to Wolverhampton Wanderers on 30 October, thanks to the first senior-level goal scored by the teenager Matt Jarvis, they remained in 23rd place in the league table, above only Rotherham United, who had yet to win a league game during the season. Gillingham kept a further two clean sheets in their first two games of November, securing 0–0 draws against Watford and Sheffield United, two teams in the top half of the table, but remained in the bottom three places themselves. They failed to score again at home to Derby County on 13 November, losing 2–0. A week later, they lost 4–1 away to Crewe Alexandra; three days later, Hessenthaler resigned as manager, but was retained as a player. John Gorman, who had been appointed assistant manager the previous month, took over as caretaker manager. He resigned a week later, after overseeing a 2–1 victory over Nottingham Forest, to take the manager's job at Wycombe Wanderers. Roberts, Smith, and the club's youth team coach Darren Hare were collectively put in charge for the next game, a 3–1 defeat to Cardiff City on 4 December. Three days later, the club appointed Stan Ternent as manager on a two-and-a-half-year contract. Ternent, who had more than 25 years of managerial experience, had been dismissed as manager of Burnley six months earlier. His first game in charge ended in a 2–0 defeat to Wigan Athletic, but a week later Gillingham gained their first win under his leadership with a 3–1 victory over Rotherham United. On 26 December, Gillingham took the lead over Brighton & Hove Albion but conceded two goals in the final 12 minutes of the game and lost 2–1. Gillingham's last game of 2004 was a 3–1 victory over Coventry City on 28 December; Ian Cox became only the second Gillingham player of the season to score two goals in a game. Despite the victory, Gillingham remained in the relegation places at the end of the calendar year.

=== January–May ===
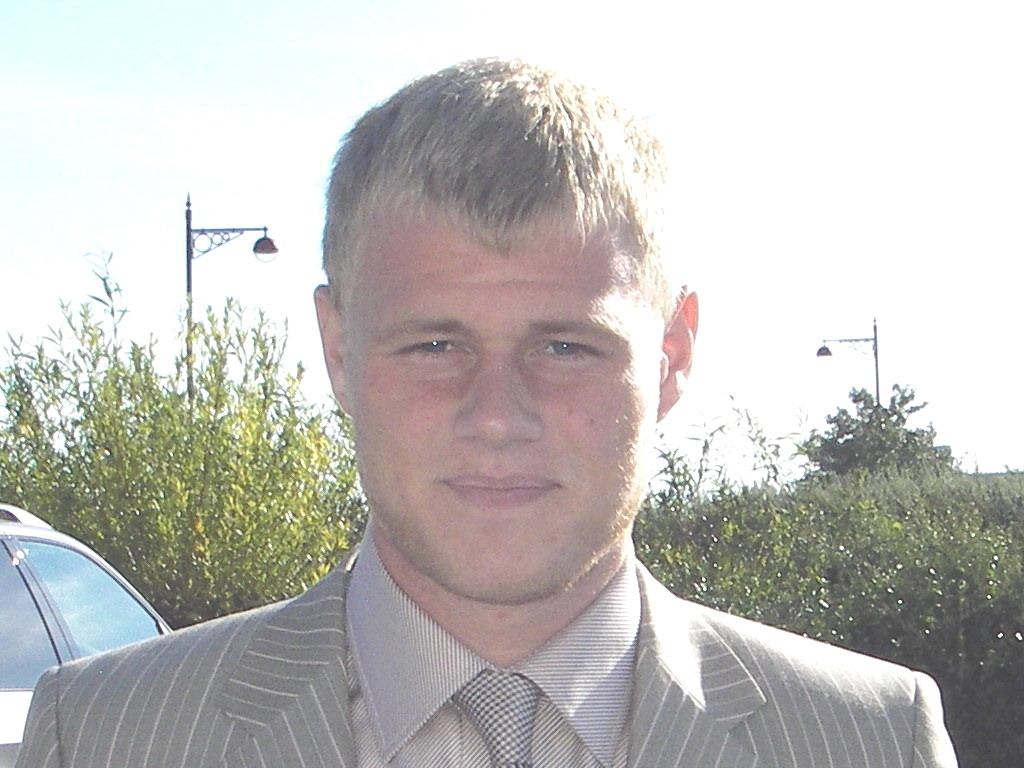
Jay McEveley (pictured in 2007) joined Gillingham on loan in the second half of the season.

Gillingham began 2005 with a goalless draw at home to Reading in a game played in very poor conditions on New Year's Day. Two days later, they held Sunderland, who were in third place in the table, to a 1–1 draw; after failing to beat their struggling opponents, the Sunderland team were booed by their own supporters. After the game, Ternent told the press "With the injuries we have, this is a satisfactory result. Hopefully eight more wins can keep us up." Gillingham continued their unbeaten league run with a 1–1 draw with Plymouth Argyle, but then lost 2–0 to Leicester City on 22 January. Hessenthaler, who had been included in the starting line-up only twice since resigning as manager, made his final appearance of the season against Leicester; days later he joined Hull City on a three-month loan. Michael Flynn, a midfielder newly signed from Wigan Athletic, made his debut against Watford on 5 February, which ended in Gillingham's second consecutive 2–0 defeat. A goalless draw with Millwall a week later meant that Gillingham had scored only two goals in six league games in 2005 and remained in the relegation places. Henderson scored the team's first goal for over a month on 19 February away to Wolverhampton Wanderers, and it appeared that Gillingham had won when Flynn gave them a 2–1 lead in the 90th minute, but the home team scored in injury time to secure a draw. Ternent was unhappy about the late goal, telling the media "First of all there was a foul on our centre-back and then the lad has handled it. Sometimes you need a bit of a break to go your way, a break that makes all the difference, and things haven't been going for us lately."

Gillingham lost 1–0 to West Ham United on 22 February, but four days later won for the first time in 2005, Henderson scoring twice in a 2–1 victory over Wigan Athletic, who were top of the Championship league table. Trevor Haylett of The Sunday Telegraph wrote that the introduction as a substitute of the forward Mamady Sidibé, who had not played since 1 January due to an achilles tendon injury, changed the course of the game in Gillingham's favour. Roberts, who had not started a match since November, was loaned to Cambridge United for the remainder of the season on 1 March. Gillingham beat fellow strugglers Rotherham United 3–1 on 5 March, the first time the team had won two consecutive games since the previous August. On 10 March, Gillingham signed two players, Jonathan Douglas and Jay McEveley, on loan from Blackburn Rovers of the FA Premier League. Both made their debut two days later against Leeds United and would play in every game for the remainder of the season. Chris Hope gave Gillingham the lead in the first half against Leeds, but 15 minutes into the second they were reduced to ten men when Henderson was sent off after a physical altercation with an opponent. Despite the numerical disadvantage, Gillingham held onto their lead until nine minutes from the end of the game when they conceded a goal; the game ended in a 1–1 draw. The unbeaten run continued with a 2–1 victory over Stoke City and a goalless draw with Ipswich Town which lifted Gillingham out of the relegation places with seven games of the season remaining. Willie Donachie, Ipswich's assistant manager, told the press "Gillingham are a tough side to play against and created the better chances. If they had a natural goalscorer, we would've been in trouble." Smith, Gillingham's captain, scored a goal in injury time to secure a draw away to Preston North End in the team's first match of April, and they followed this with a third consecutive draw three days later, Flynn scoring against Queens Park Rangers in a match which finished 1–1. With five games remaining, Gillingham were in 21st place, above the relegation positions on goal difference.

On 9 April, Gillingham extended their unbeaten run to eight games and climbed to 18th in the table when Henderson scored to give them a 1–0 victory at home to Burnley. A minor controversy arose when the matchday sponsorship package for the game was purchased by the anti-immigration UK Independence Party; the associated advertising in the matchday programme was withdrawn under pressure from the Professional Footballers' Association, the trade union for players. Gillingham drew for the fourth time in five games on 16 April when their game with another relegation-threatened team, Crewe Alexandra, finished 1–1; a week later they lost for the first time since February as promotion contenders Derby County beat them 2–0. Another draw, 1–1 against Cardiff City, meant that, going into the final game of the season, away to Nottingham Forest, Gillingham were two points above the bottom three places, but could still be relegated depending on their own result and those achieved by other teams. After conceding a goal in the first half, Gillingham scored twice and were winning with six minutes of the game remaining; a victory would ensure that they escaped relegation regardless of the outcome of other games. On the 85-minute mark, Gillingham conceded a second goal and, despite having two late goalscoring opportunities, they could not regain the lead; the game ended in a 2–2 draw. As Crewe Alexandra won their final game and Brighton & Hove Albion secured a draw, Gillingham's failure to win meant that they were relegated. In a reversal of the previous season's conclusion, Gillingham finished the campaign in 22nd place, level on points with 21st-placed Crewe but with a goal difference (–21) which was one worse than that of their rivals. Reviewing each Championship team's season, BBC Sport said that Gillingham "showed tremendous character but couldn't quite pull it off."

=== League match details ===
Key

- In result column, Gillingham's score shown first
- H = Home match
- A = Away match
- pen. = Penalty kick
- o.g. = Own goal

Results
Date	Opponents	Result	Goalscorers	Attendance
7 August 2004	Ipswich Town (A)	1–2	Smith	23,130
10 August 2004	Leeds United (H)	2–1	Byfield, Roberts	10,739
14 August 2004	Preston North End (H)	2–1	Byfield, Roberts	7,073
21 August 2004	Stoke City (A)	0–2		13,234
27 August 2004	Queens Park Rangers (H)	0–1		7,391
30 August 2004	Burnley (A)	2–1	Roberts, Byfield	11,574
11 September 2004	Sunderland (H)	0–4		8,775
15 September 2004	Coventry City (A)	2–2	Agyemang (2)	11,966
18 September 2004	Reading (A)	1–3	Byfield	13,867
25 September 2004	Brighton & Hove Albion (H)	0–1		8,365
28 September 2004	Leicester City (H)	0–2		6,089
2 October 2004	Plymouth Argyle (A)	1–2	Henderson	13,665
17 October 2004	Sheffield United (H)	1–3	Bromby (o.g.)	6,964
19 October 2004	Millwall (A)	1–2	Nowland	10,722
23 October 2004	West Ham United (A)	1–3	Byfield	25,247
30 October 2004	Wolverhampton Wanderers (H)	1–0	Jarvis	9,112
2 November 2004	Watford (H)	0–0		7,009
6 November 2004	Sheffield United (A)	0–0		16,598
13 November 2004	Derby County (H)	0–2		8,015
20 November 2004	Crewe Alexandra (A)	1–4	Henderson	6,128
27 November 2004	Nottingham Forest (H)	2–1	Henderson (pen.), Johnson	8,784
4 December 2004	Cardiff City (A)	1–3	Johnson	10,623
11 December 2004	Wigan Athletic (A)	0–2		8,451
18 December 2004	Rotherham United (H)	3–1	Hope, Jarvis, Vernazza (o.g.)	8,576
26 December 2004	Brighton & Hove Albion (A)	1–2	Crofts	6,420
28 December 2004	Coventry City (H)	3–1	Byfield, Cox (2)	8,734
1 January 2005	Reading (H)	0–0		8,570
3 January 2005	Sunderland (A)	1–1	Henderson	27,147
15 January 2005	Plymouth Argyle (H)	1–1	Crofts	8,451
22 January 2005	Leicester City (A)	0–2		23,457
5 February 2005	Watford (A)	0–2		15,188
12 February 2005	Millwall (H)	0–0		9,127
19 February 2005	Wolverhampton Wanderers (A)	2–2	Henderson, Flynn	24,949
22 February 2005	West Ham United (H)	0–1		9,510
26 February 2005	Wigan Athletic (H)	2–1	Henderson (2)	7,209
5 March 2005	Rotherham United (A)	3–1	Flynn, Sidibé, Henderson	4,367
12 March 2005	Leeds United (A)	1–1	Hope	27,995
15 March 2005	Stoke City (H)	2–1	McEveley, Smith	7,766
19 March 2005	Ipswich Town (H)	0–0		9,311
2 April 2005	Preston North End (A)	1–1	Smith	15,054
5 April 2005	Queens Park Rangers (A)	1–1	Flynn	16,431
9 April 2005	Burnley (H)	1–0	Henderson	9,447
16 April 2005	Crewe Alexandra (H)	1–1	Southall	10,315
23 April 2005	Derby County (A)	0–2		27,481
30 April 2005	Cardiff City (H)	1–1	Jarvis	10,810
8 May 2005	Nottingham Forest (A)	2–2	Melville (o.g.), Sidibé	24,800

=== Partial league table ===
Football League Championship final table, bottom positions
Pos	Team	Pld	W	D	L	GF	GA	GD	Pts	Promotion or relegation
20	Brighton & Hove Albion	46	13	12	21	40	65	−25	51	
21	Crewe Alexandra	46	12	14	20	66	86	−20	50	
22	Gillingham	46	12	14	20	45	66	−21	50	Relegated
23	Nottingham Forest	46	9	17	20	42	66	−24	44	Relegated
24	Rotherham United	46	5	14	27	35	69	−34	29	Relegated

== Cup matches ==
=== FA Cup ===
As a Championship team, Gillingham entered the 2004–05 FA Cup at the third round stage in January; their opponents were Portsmouth of the FA Premier League. Portsmouth scored early in the second half and won 1–0 to eliminate Gillingham from the competition. Ternent told the media that "we have gone out with our heads held high because we had a lot of injuries and it was always going to be tough because Portsmouth are a strong team."

==== FA Cup match details ====
Key

- In result column, Gillingham's score shown first
- H = Home match
- A = Away match
- pen. = Penalty kick
- o.g. = Own goal

Results
Date	Round	Opponents	Result	Goalscorers	Attendance
8 January 2005	Third	Portsmouth (A)	0–1		14,252

=== Football League Cup ===
As a Championship team, Gillingham entered the 2004–05 Football League Cup at the first round stage in August; their opponents were Northampton Town of League Two, two levels below the Championship. The match drew an attendance of 3,108, by far the lowest of the season at Priestfield. Northampton scored two goals in the first half and, although Gillingham pulled a goal back through Sidibé early in the second period, they were beaten 2–1 by their lower-level opponents and eliminated from the competition.

==== League Cup match details ====
Key

- In result column, Gillingham's score shown first
- H = Home match
- A = Away match
- pen. = Penalty kick
- o.g. = Own goal

Results
Date	Round	Opponents	Result	Goalscorers	Attendance
24 August 2004	First	Northampton Town (H)	1–2	Sidibé	3,108

== Players ==
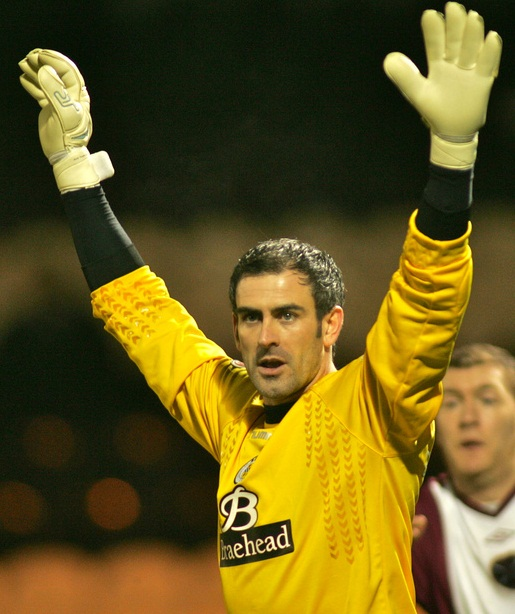
Paul Gallacher (pictured in 2010) was one of four goalkeepers to play for Gillingham during the season.

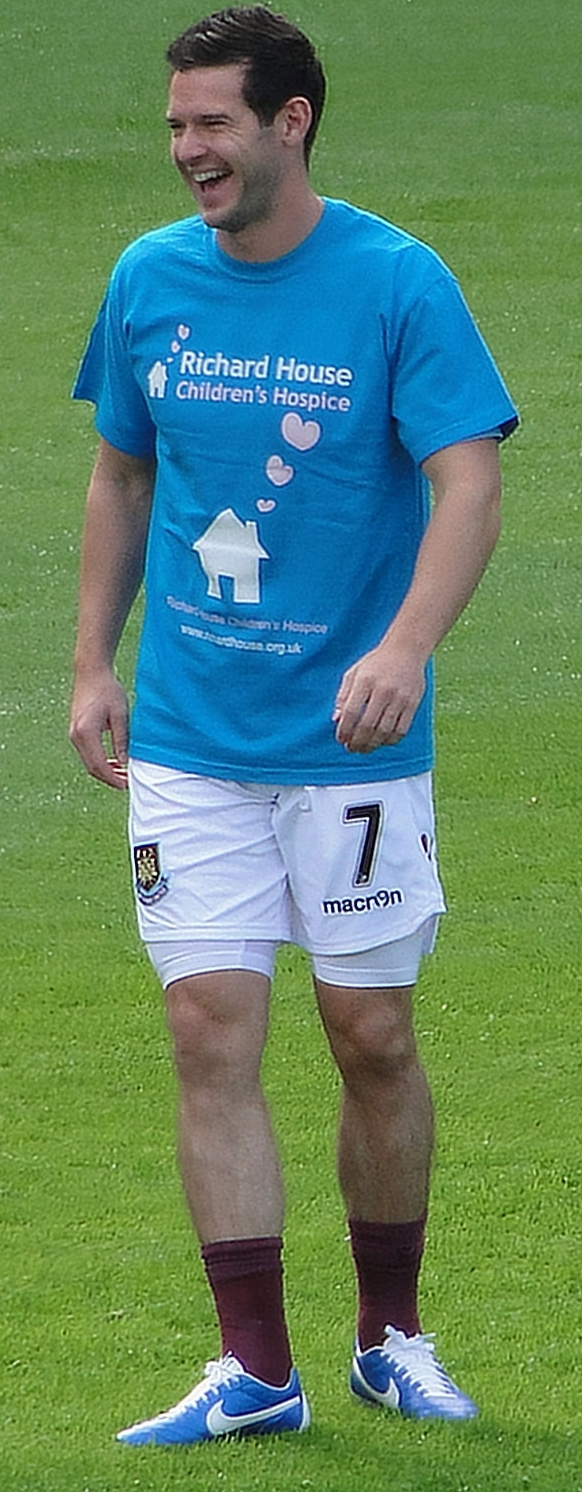
The future England international Matt Jarvis (pictured in 2012) made 30 appearances.

During the season, 34 players made at least one appearance for Gillingham. Smith was the only player to make more than 40 appearances, playing 43 times. Byfield, Sidibé, Hope, and Nyron Nosworthy played in at least three-quarters of the team's 48 games. At the opposite end of the scale, nine players made fewer than five appearances. Dean Beckwith was the only player to take the field during the season without being named in a starting line-up; his two appearances as a substitute ultimately constituted the entirety of his Gillingham career. Henderson was the team's top goalscorer with nine goals. It was the second consecutive season in which no Gillingham player scored ten goals; before this there had only been one season since the club's return to the Football League more than 50 years earlier when no Gillingham player had reached double figures.

Player statistics
No.	Player	Position	Championship		FA Cup		League Cup		Total	
No.	Player	Position	Apps	Goals	Apps	Goals	Apps	Goals	Apps	Goals
1	Steve Banks	GK	26	0	1	0	0	0	27	0
2	Nyron Nosworthy	DF	37	0	0	0	0	0	37	0
3	John Hills	DF	23	0	0	0	0	0	23	0
4	Paul Smith	MF	41	3	1	0	1	0	43	3
5	Barry Ashby	DF	22	0	1	0	1	0	24	0
6	Ian Cox	DF	31	2	1	0	1	0	33	2
7	Nicky Southall	MF	33	1	1	0	0	0	34	1
8	Andy Hessenthaler	MF	17	0	1	0	0	0	18	0
9	Darius Henderson	FW	32	9	1	0	0	0	33	9
10	Patrick Agyemang	FW	13	2	0	0	1	0	14	2
10^{[a]}	Michael Flynn	MF	16	3	0	0	0	0	16	3
11	Tommy Johnson	FW	8	2	0	0	0	0	8	2
12	Bertrand Bossu	GK	2	0	0	0	0	0	2	0
13	Jason Brown	GK	16	0	0	0	1	0	17	0
14	Leon Johnson	DF	8	0	0	0	1	0	9	0
15	Mark Saunders	MF	3	0	0	0	0	0	3	0
16	Richard Rose	DF	18	0	1	0	1	0	20	0
17	Andrew Crofts	MF	27	2	1	0	0	0	28	2
18	Chris Hope	DF	37	2	1	0	0	0	38	2
19	Iwan Roberts	FW	20	3	1	0	1	0	22	3
20	Darren Byfield	FW	38	6	1	0	0	0	39	6
21	Matt Jarvis	MF	30	3	0	0	1	0	31	3
22	Danny Spiller	MF	22	0	0	0	1	0	23	0
23	Matt Bodkin	FW	2	0	1	0	0	0	3	0
24	Adam Nowland	MF	3	1	0	0	0	0	3	1
24^{[a]}	Jay McEveley	DF	10	1	0	0	0	0	10	1
25	Alan Pouton	MF	12	0	0	0	1	0	13	0
26	David Perpetuini	MF	3	0	0	0	1	0	4	0
26^{[a]}	Jonathan Douglas	MF	10	0	0	0	0	0	10	0
28	Dean Beckwith	MF	1	0	1	0	0	0	2	0
29	Mamady Sidibé	FW	35	2	0	0	1	1	36	3
30	John Robinson	MF	4	0	0	0	0	0	4	0
30^{[a]}	Paul Gallacher	GK	3	0	0	0	0	0	3	0
31	Dean Marney	MF	3	0	0	0	0	0	3	0

FW = Forward, MF = Midfielder, GK = Goalkeeper, DF = Defender

a. Player was allocated a squad number which had been worn earlier in the season by a player who had since left the club.

== Aftermath ==
A week after the final game of the season, Ternent resigned as manager, less than six months into his two-and-a-half-year contract. Ronnie Jepson, who had served as his assistant manager, remained with the club. Roberts, who had been relieved of his coaching duties after falling out with Ternent and Jepson, was released from his contract and told the BBC that he had "been shown a total lack of respect by certain people." Neale Cooper was appointed to replace Ternent for the team's first season back in the third tier of English football, but he also lasted less than six months in the job, resigning in November 2005 after a series of poor results. Gillingham would go on to be relegated and promoted between League One and League Two on multiple occasions but as of 2025 have never returned to the second tier of English football.
