= 2004–05 Watford F.C. season =

English football team season

Watford
2004–05 season
- Chairman: Graham Simpson
- Manager: Ray Lewington (until 22 March); Aidy Boothroyd (from 29 March)
- Stadium: Vicarage Road
- Championship: 18th
- FA Cup: Third round
- League Cup: Semi-finals
- Top goalscorer: League: Heiðar Helguson (16); All: Heiðar Helguson (20)
- Average home league attendance: 14,289

During the 2004–05 English football season, Watford competed in the Football League Championship.

== Season summary ==
The 2004–05 season saw a continuation of the good form of the end of the previous season, with the club well in the upper half of the Championship at the end of September. However, a long run of poor form subsequently saw the club drop steadily towards the relegation zone. Another good cup run further eased the club's financial position, with the team reaching the semi-final of the League Cup, soundly beating Premiership sides Portsmouth and Southampton on the way, before losing narrowly to Liverpool. The club's poor league form, however, came to a head in March, with a run of terrible performances and Lewington was sacked on 22 March. His sacking was controversial, and many fans were unhappy at the loss of a man who had led the club to two cup semi-finals in three seasons, enduring considerable financial hardships.

At the age of 34, Aidy Boothroyd was appointed manager of Watford after serving at Leeds United as a coach; 70-year-old Keith Burkinshaw was recruited as his assistant. Boothroyd's inexperience raised concerns among fans, who worried that he would not be able to keep the side in the Championship. However, Watford secured enough points to ensure survival with two games to go in the season.

== Final league table ==
Pos	Team	Pld	W	D	L	GF	GA	GD	Pts
16	Cardiff City	46	13	15	18	48	51	−3	54
17	Plymouth Argyle	46	14	11	21	52	64	−12	53
18	Watford	46	12	16	18	52	59	−7	52
19	Coventry City	46	13	13	20	61	73	−12	52
20	Brighton & Hove Albion	46	13	12	21	40	65	−25	51

Updated to match(es) played on 9 December 2011. Source: Football League Tables
Rules for classification: 1) points; 2) goal difference; 3) number of goals scored.

== Results ==
Watford's score comes first

=== Legend ===
Win	Draw	Loss

=== Football League Championship ===
Date	Opponent	Venue	Result	Attendance	Scorers
7 August 2004	Preston North End	A	1–2	12,208	Devlin
9 August 2004	Queens Park Rangers	H	3–0	14,737	Webber (2), Dyer
14 August 2004	Burnley	H	0–1	12,048	
21 August 2004	Leicester City	A	1–0	22,478	Webber
28 August 2004	Plymouth Argyle	H	3–1	13,104	Ardley, Webber (2)
11 September 2004	Brighton & Hove Albion	H	1–1	14,148	Webber
14 September 2004	Cardiff City	A	3–0	10,606	Webber (2), Ardley
19 September 2004	Millwall	A	2–0	10,865	Webber, Helguson
25 September 2004	Reading	H	0–1	13,389	
28 September 2004	Wigan Athletic	H	0–0	11,361	
2 October 2004	Crewe Alexandra	A	0–3	6,382	
16 October 2004	Derby County	A	2–2	23,253	Helguson (2)
19 October 2004	Sunderland	H	1–1	13,198	Ardley
23 October 2004	Ipswich Town	H	2–2	22,497	Helguson, Bouazza
30 October 2004	Nottingham Forest	A	2–1	24,473	Helguson (2)
2 November 2004	Gillingham	A	0–0	7,009	
6 November 2004	Derby County	H	2–2	13,689	Helguson, Gunnarsson
13 November 2004	Sheffield United	A	1–1	18,454	Gunnarsson
20 November 2004	Rotherham United	H	0–0	17,780	
24 November 2004	Leeds United	A	2–2	24,585	Dyer (2)
27 November 2004	West Ham United	A	2–3	24,541	Gunnarsson, Dyer
4 December 2004	Stoke City	H	0–1	12,169	
11 December 2004	Wolverhampton Wanderers	H	1–1	14,605	Helguson
18 December 2004	Coventry City	A	0–1	14,493	
26 December 2004	Reading	A	0–3	18,757	
28 December 2004	Cardiff City	H	0–0	13,409	
1 January 2005	Millwall	H	1–0	13,158	Helguson
3 January 2005	Brighton & Hove Albion	A	1–2	6,335	Helguson
15 January 2005	Crewe Alexandra	H	3–1	11,223	Helguson (2), DeMerit
22 January 2005	Wigan Athletic	A	2–2	9,008	Dyer, Webber
5 February 2005	Gillingham	H	2–0	15,188	Ashby (own goal), Eagles
12 February 2005	Sunderland	A	2–4	24,948	Dyer (2)
22 February 2005	Ipswich Town	A	2–1	23,993	DeMerit, Dyer
26 February 2005	Wolverhampton Wanderers	A	0–0	25,060	
5 March 2005	Coventry City	H	2–3	13,794	Dyer, Webber
8 March 2005	Nottingham Forest	H	0–2	12,118	
12 March 2005	Queens Park Rangers	A	1–3	16,638	Ardley
15 March 2005	Leicester City	H	2–2	11,084	DeMerit, Webber (pen)
19 March 2005	Preston North End	H	0–2	19,649	
2 April 2005	Burnley	A	1–3	11,507	Blizzard
5 April 2005	Plymouth Argyle	A	0–1	15,333	
9 April 2005	Leeds United	H	1–2	16,306	Helguson
16 April 2005	Rotherham United	A	1–0	5,438	Helguson
23 April 2005	Sheffield United	H	0–0	17,138	
30 April 2005	Stoke City	A	1–0	15,229	Helguson
8 May 2005	West Ham United	H	1–2	19,673	Helguson

=== FA Cup ===
Round	Date	Opponent	Venue	Result	Attendance	Goalscorers
R3	8 January 2005	Fulham	H	1–1	14,896	Helguson (pen)
R3R	19 January 2005	Fulham	A	0–2	11,306	

=== League Cup ===
Round	Date	Opponent	Venue	Result	Attendance	Goalscorers
R1	24 August 2004	Cambridge United	H	1–0	6,558	Ferrell
R2	21 September 2004	Reading	A	3–0	8,429	Cox (pen), Bouazza, Ingimarsson (own goal)
R3	26 October 2004	Sheffield United	A	0–0 (won 4–2 on pens)	7,689	
R4	9 November 2004	Southampton	H	5–2	13,008	Dyer, Chambers (2), Helguson, Bouazza
R5	30 November 2004	Portsmouth	H	3–0	18,877	Helguson (2), Dyer
SF 1st Leg	11 January 2005	Liverpool	A	0–1	35,739	
SF 2nd Leg	25 January 2005	Liverpool	H	0–1	19,797	

== Players ==
=== First-team squad ===
Squad at end of season

Note: Flags indicate national team as defined under FIFA eligibility rules; some limited exceptions apply. Players may hold more than one non-FIFA nationality.

No.	Pos.	Nation	Player
1	GK	ENG	Alec Chamberlain
3	DF	ENG	Paul Mayo
4	DF	ISL	Brynjar Gunnarsson
5	DF	ENG	Neil Cox
6	DF	ENG	Sean Dyche
7	FW	ENG	Bruce Dyer (Note: Dyer was born in Redbridge, England, and represented them at U-21 level, but played a friendly game for Montserrat against Ashford Town in September 2007.)
8	MF	ENG	Gavin Mahon
9	FW	ENG	Danny Webber
10	MF	SCO	Paul Devlin (Note: Devlin was born in Birmingham, England, but also qualified to represent Scotland internationally through his father and made his international debut for Scotland in October 2002.)
11	MF	ENG	Andy Ferrell
14	DF	ENG	Jermaine Darlington
16	GK	ENG	Richard Lee
17	MF	ENG	Jamie Hand
18	FW	ISL	Heiðar Helguson
19	DF	ENG	James Chambers
20	DF	ENG	Lloyd Doyley (Note: Doyley was born in Tower Hamlets, England, but also qualified to represent Jamaica internationally and would make his international debut for Jamaica in March 2013.)
21	DF	ENG	Jack Smith

No.	Pos.	Nation	Player
22	MF	ENG	Dominic Blizzard
23	MF	ENG	Anthony McNamee
24	FW	TRI	Jason Norville
25	FW	FRA	Hameur Bouazza (Note: Bouazza was born in Évry, France, but also qualified to represent Algeria internationally through his parents and would make his international debut for Algeria in February 2007.)
26	DF	ENG	Ben Herd
27	MF	ENG	Ashley Young
28	MF	ENG	Jamie Collins
29	DF	USA	Jay DeMerit
30	FW	ENG	Omari Coleman
31	MF	FRA	Toumani Diagouraga
32	DF	ENG	Danny Cullip (on loan from Sheffield United)
33	DF	ENG	Junior Osborne
35	GK	ENG	Reece Kirk
37	MF	SLE	Al Bangura
38	DF	ENG	Adrian Mariappa (Note: Mariappa was born in Harrow, England, but also qualified to represent Fiji internationally through his father and Jamaica through his maternal grandparents and would make his international debut for Jamaica in June 2012.)
39	MF	ENG	Joel Grant (Note: Grant was born in Ealing, England, but also qualified to represent Jamaica internationally and represented Jamaica at U-23 level before making his international debut for Jamaica in May 2014.)

=== Left club during season ===
Note: Flags indicate national team as defined under FIFA eligibility rules; some limited exceptions apply. Players may hold more than one non-FIFA nationality.

No.	Pos.	Nation	Player
2	MF	ENG	Neal Ardley (to Cardiff City)
12	FW	ENG	Scott Fitzgerald (to Brentford)
13	GK	WAL	Paul Jones (on loan from Wolverhampton Wanderers)
15	DF	JAM	Marcus Gayle (Note: Gayle was born in Hammersmith, London, and represented them at U-18 level, but also qualified to represent Jamaica internationally through his father and made his international debut for Jamaica in 1998.) (to Brentford)

No.	Pos.	Nation	Player
32	MF	ENG	Johnnie Jackson (on loan from Tottenham Hotspur)
34	MF	ENG	Chris Eagles (on loan from Manchester United)
42	GK	ENG	Kevin Hitchcock (retired)

== Transfers ==
=== In ===
- (England) Andy Ferrell – (England) Newcastle United, free
- (England) Jermaine Darlington – (England) Milton Keynes Dons, free
- (England) James Chambers – (England) West Bromwich Albion, £250,000

=== Out ===
- (England) Paolo Vernazza – (England) Rotherham United, free
- (England) Wayne Brown – (England) Colchester United, free
- (Jamaica) Micah Hyde (Note: Hyde was born in Newham, England, but also qualified to represent Jamaica internationally and made his international debut for Jamaica in 2001.) – (England) Burnley, free
- (England) Neal Ardley – (Wales) Cardiff City, free
- (England) Scott Fitzgerald – (England) Brentford, free
- (Jamaica) Marcus Gayle – (England) Brentford, free
