= Trent McClenahan =

Australian soccer player

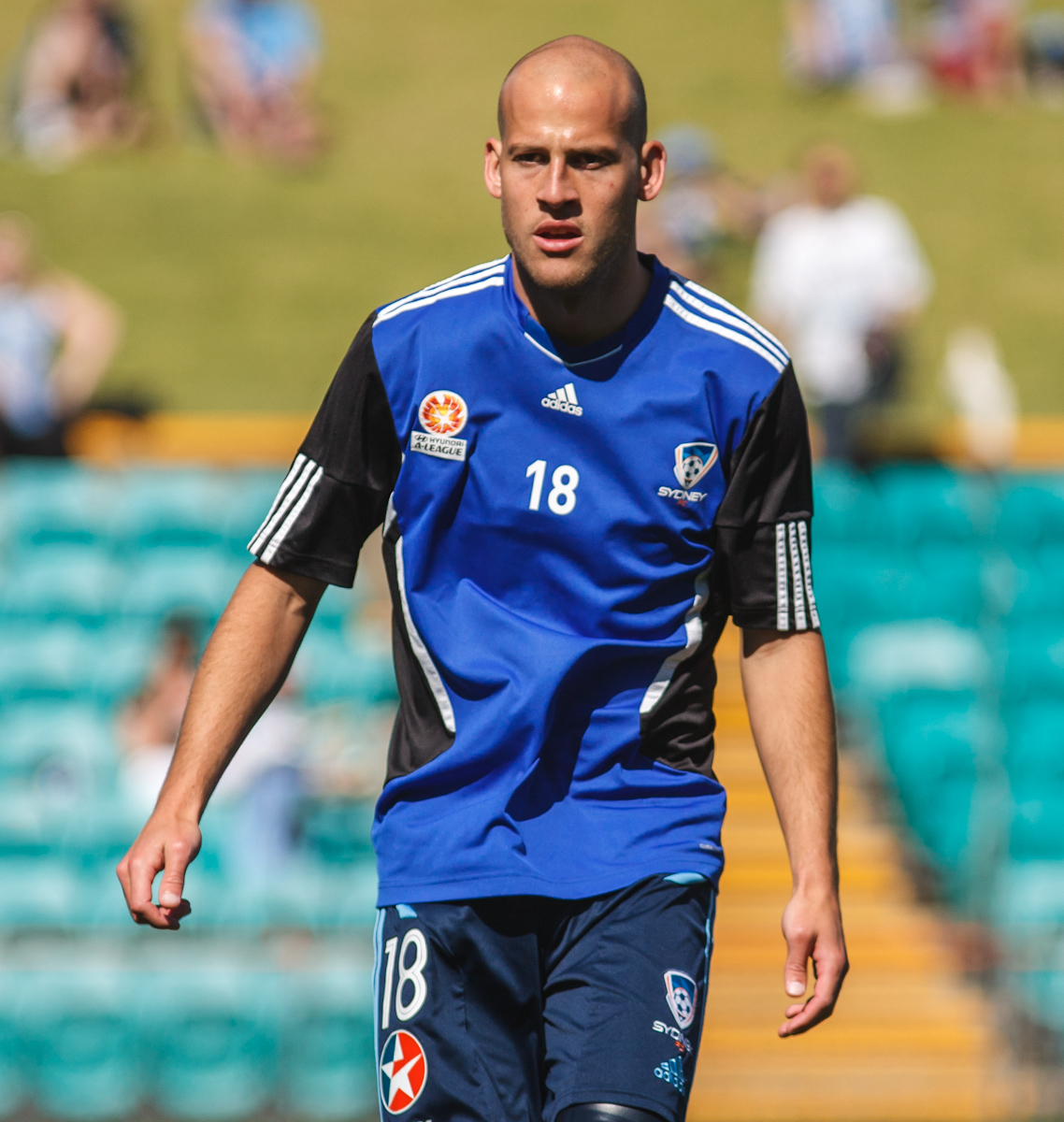

Personal information
- Full name: Trent James McClenahan
- Date of birth: 4 February 1985 (age 41)
- Place of birth: Chipping Norton, Australia
- Height: 1.83 m (6 ft 0 in)
- Positions: Defender; defensive midfielder

Youth career
- 2001–2002: Parramatta Power

Senior career*
Years	Team	Apps	(Gls)
2002–2006	West Ham United	2	(0)
2005	→ Milton Keynes Dons (loan)	8	(0)
2005–2006	→ Milton Keynes Dons (loan)	29	(0)
2006–2008	Hereford United	64	(2)
2008–2010	Hamilton Academical	50	(0)
2010–2011	Scunthorpe United	1	(0)
2011	Perth Glory	5	(0)
2012	Central Coast Mariners	6	(0)
2012–2013	Sydney FC	15	(0)
2014	PTT Rayong	29	(1)
2015	Phuket	24	(0)
2016–2019	Rockdale City Suns	63	(2)

International career^{‡}
2004–2005	Australia U20	9	(0)
2007–2008	Australia U23	18	(0)
- * Club domestic league appearances and goals as of 5 September 2018 ‡ National team caps and goals as of 25 January 2009

Trent James McClenahan (born 4 February 1985) is an Australian footballer who last played for Rockdale City Suns FC. McClenahan has been capped for the Olyroos and represented Australia at the Beijing Olympics.

== Club career ==
He was born in Chipping Norton, New South Wales and was a student at Westfields Sports High School, playing for Chipping Norton FC, Bankstown, Sydney Olympic, Parramatta Power and captaining NSW at all youth levels.

=== West Ham United ===
At the age of 16, he left Australia and signed for West Ham United on a 3 yr deal after impressing in trials. After rising through the ranks made his league debut, aged 19, against Crewe Alexandra in August 2004, the first of three first team appearances for the club, achieving promotion to the Premier League. He then went on to signing a 2-year extension, before leaving for more playing opportunities. After his loan spell away from West Ham United, McClenahan left along with six players.

=== MK Dons ===
He went out on loan to Milton Keynes Dons in March 2005, which was extended for the duration of the 2005–06 season. In all he made over 40 first team appearances for MK Dons.

=== Hereford United ===
McClenahan signed for Hereford United in August 2006. McClenahan was previously linked with a Scottish move to Kilmarnock. On the opening game of the season, McClenahan made his debut, coming on as a substitute, in a 3–0 loss against Barnet. In the second round of the League Cup on 19 September 2006, he received a red card in a 76th minutes in a 3–1 loss against Leicester City. He settled into the first team in the right-back position, and despite being in competition for the position with Simon Travis, went on to make 30 first team appearances scoring once, against Notts County on 28 January 2007. He was in and out of the Hereford side in the early part of the 2007–08 season due to his international commitments, but managed to score his second goal for the club against Lincoln City. Thereafter he featured in every first team match as Hereford gained promotion to League One.

He was offered a new contract, but declined.

=== Hamilton Academical ===
McClenahan signed for Scottish side Hamilton Academical on 19 September 2008 on a one-year contract. Eight days later, he made his debut for 'Accies', setting up a goal for opposition goalkeeper Bobby Olejnik, who scored an own-goal in a 4–1 loss against Falkirk and also set up a goal for Richard Offiong in a 2–1 loss against Celtic on 16 November 2008 Since making his debut, McClenahan went on to become a fan favourite and regular part of the first team at Hamilton.

In his two-years spell at Hamilton, he went on to make 50 appearances for the club in the Scottish Premier League helping the club to its highest finish in the SPL, 7th. He left the club at the end of the 2009/10 season after failing to agree a new contract.

=== Scunthorpe United ===
After playing in Scunthorpe's 4–2 penalty victory against Grimbsy in the Lincolnshire Cup, McClenahan was offered a contract by Iron boss Nigel Adkins, allowing him to be in contention for a place for Scunthorpe's first game away at Reading on 7 August. But only stayed on the bench, without coming on.

Nigel Adkins left the club weeks later, accepting the job at Southampton. With the change of manager, McClenahan went on to only make one appearance in the English Championship.

He was also called up to a National Team Training Camp by Holger Osieck during his time at Scunthorpe.

=== Perth Glory ===
On 14 November 2011, it was announced he had signed for A-League outfit Perth Glory on an 8-week injury replacement contract due to the injury of Scott Neville.

=== Central Coast Mariners ===
On 29 February 2012, he was added to the A-League outfit Central Coast Mariners for their Asian Champions League campaign where he made 1 start against Seongnam Ilhwa Chunma and a further 2 substitute appearances in the ACL. McClenahan was also a part of the A-League squad that went on to win the A-League Premiership: 2011–12.

=== Sydney FC ===
On 10 August 2012, McClenahan was signed to a 1-year deal with Sydney FC. On the opening game of the season on 6 October 2012, McClenahan made his debut in a 2–0 loss against Wellington Phoenix. He was joined in the side by high-profile players Alessandro Del Piero, Brett Emerton, Lucas Neill and Jason Culina.

== International career ==
McClenahan captained the Australia U20 side and was part of the squad for the 2005 FIFA World Youth Championship and played in all 3 games.

He was then called up into the Australia U23 squad where he made 18 appearances. He featured in the Australian team that reached the final of the Intercontinental Cup. He was selected for the Olympics in Beijing and featured in all 3 games during the tournament.

Australia coach Graham Arnold selected McClenahan in a squad for the international friendly against Ghana Football Association in London on 14 November 2006.

McClenahan was also called up to an Australia training camp in 2011 by coach Holger Osieck during the early stages of his reign.

== Career statistics ==
As of 9 September 2016

Appearances and goals by club, season and competition
Club	Season	League			National Cup		League Cup		Continental		Other		Total	
Club	Season	Division	Apps	Goals	Apps	Goals	Apps	Goals	Apps	Goals	Apps	Goals	Apps	Goals
West Ham United	2004–05	Championship	2	0	0	0	1	0	0	0	0	0	3	0
MK Dons (loan)	2004–05	League One	8	0	0	0	0	0	0	0	0	0	8	0
MK Dons (loan)	2005–06	League One	29	0	4	0	1	0	0	0	0	0	34	0
MK Dons (loan)	MK Dons total		37	0	4	0	1	0	0	0	0	0	42	0
Hereford United	2006–07	Football League Two	26	1	1	0	2	0	0	0	1	0	30	1
Hereford United	2007–08	Football League Two	37	1	4	0	2	0	0	0	1	0	44	1
Hereford United	Hereford United total		63	2	5	0	4	0	0	0	2	0	74	2
Hamilton Academical	2008–09	Scottish Premier League	23	0	1	0	1	0	0	0	0	0	25	0
Hamilton Academical	2009–10	Scottish Premier League	27	0	2	0	0	0	0	0	0	0	29	0
Hamilton Academical	Hamilton Academical total		50	0	3	0	1	0	0	0	0	0	54	0
Scunthorpe United	2010–11	Championship	1	0	0	0	0	0	0	0	0	0	1	0
Perth Glory	2011–12	A-League	5	0	—		—		0	0	0	0	5	0
Central Coast Mariners	2011–12	A-League	0	0	—		—		3	0	0	0	3	0
Sydney FC	2012–13	A-League	12	0	—		—		0	0	0	0	12	0
PTT Rayong	2014	Thai Division 1 League	24	0	2	1	4	0	0	0	0	0	30	1
Phuket	2015	Thai Division 1 League	10	0	0	0	0	0	0	0	0	0	10	0
Rockdale City Suns	2016	National Premier Leagues	21	0	1	0	0	0	0	0	0	0	22	0
Career total			225	2	15	1	11	0	3	0	2	0	256	3
