= Richard Rose (footballer) =

English footballer

Personal information
- Full name: Richard Alan Rose
- Date of birth: 8 September 1982 (age 44)
- Place of birth: Tonbridge, England
- Height: 6 ft 0 in (1.83 m)
- Positions: Defender; midfielder

Youth career
- –2001: Gillingham

Senior career*
Years	Team	Apps	(Gls)
2001–2006	Gillingham	58	(0)
2002	→ Longford Town (loan)	4	(0)
2002–2003	→ Bristol Rovers (loan)	9	(0)
2006–2011	Hereford United	165	(4)
2011–2012	Dagenham & Redbridge	10	(1)
2012–2013	Dartford	36	(2)
2013–2014	Whitehawk	17	(0)
2013	→ Maidstone United (loan)	7	(0)
2014–2015	Hastings United	27	(0)
Total		333	(7)
- * Club domestic league appearances and goals

Richard Alan Rose (born 8 September 1982) is an English former professional footballer who played as a defender. He was noted for his versatility, having played in both the full-back and centre-back positions, and occasionally in central midfield.

== Playing career ==
Rose was born in Tonbridge, Kent and joined Gillingham as a youth player. Whilst still a trainee he made his professional debut as a 14th minute substitute in Gillingham's 2–1 defeat at Crewe Alexandra on 16 April 2001. Rose went on to play in the final four games of the season in place of the injured Mark Patterson. He made only a handful of Division One appearances for the Gills in the following two seasons, but had a 9 match spell on loan at then Division Three side Bristol Rovers during the 2002–03 season. He was reported to have done well whilst with the Pirates, receiving glowing reports from manager Ray Graydon.

Rose started to establish himself more in the 2004–05 season, during which time he played 20 times (18 in the league), mostly at right or left back. Gillingham were eventually relegated back down to League One at the end of that season. Relegation prompted the departures of Nyron Nosworthy (a right back) and John Hills (a left back), presenting Rose to stake a claim for a regular spot in the starting line-up in League One. Things certainly started according to plan as Neale Cooper gave Rose a permanent right-back spot. With Cooper's departure midway through the season, Rose was out of favour under new manager Ronnie Jepson and only made one more appearance for the first team. He was released on 9 May 2006.

Rose soon found a new home at newly promoted Hereford United where he played initially in centre midfield. He started 15 out of the first 16 matches of the season in League Two and scored his first senior goal in a 2–0 home win over Chester. He was then dropped in favour of loan signings John Eustace and Neil MacKenzie. When he returned to the side he reverted to the defence where he finished the season as third choice centre back.

Rose was used mainly as a full-back during the 2007–08 season and scored the second goal of his career in a superb 5–1 victory over Darlington. He was a regular starter for the Bulls in their promotion-winning season, but was sidelined for six weeks mid-season with a fractured ankle. Rose started 17 of the final 20 league matches of the season as Hereford finished third in League Two.

In August 2011 Rose signed for Dagenham & Redbridge.

In October 2013 Rose signed on a two-month loan at Maidstone United from Conference South side Whitehawk.

During the 2014-15 season, Rose played for Hastings United.

== Personal life ==
Rose is a cousin of former EastEnders actor Ricky Groves.

== Career statistics ==
As of match played 26 April 2014.

Club statistics
Club	Season	League			National Cup		League Cup		Other		Total	
Club	Season	Division	Apps	Goals	Apps	Goals	Apps	Goals	Apps	Goals	Apps	Goals
Gillingham	2000–01	First Division	4	0	0	0	0	0	—		4	0
Gillingham	2001–02	First Division	3	0	0	0	0	0	—		3	0
Gillingham	2002–03	First Division	2	0	0	0	1	0	—		3	0
Gillingham	2003–04	First Division	17	0	0	0	0	0	—		17	0
Gillingham	2004–05	Championship	18	0	1	0	1	0	—		20	0
Gillingham	2005–06	League One	14	0	0	0	2	0	1 (Note: Appearance(s) in Football League Trophy)	0	17	0
Gillingham	Total		58	0	1	0	4	0	1	0	64	0
Longford Town (loan)	2001–02	LOI Premier Division	4	0	0	0	—		0	0	4	0
Bristol Rovers (loan)	2002–03	Third Division	9	0	0	0	0	0	0	0	9	0
Hereford United	2006–07	League Two	33	1	3	0	2	0	1	0	39	1
Hereford United	2007–08	League Two	31	1	5	0	2	0	1	0	39	1
Hereford United	2008–09	League One	42	0	2	0	1	0	0	0	45	0
Hereford United	2009–10	League Two	25	0	0	0	2	0	3	0	30	0
Hereford United	2010–11	League Two	34	2	5	1	0	0	1	0	40	3
Hereford United	Total		165	4	15	1	7	0	6	0	193	5
Dagenham & Redbridge	2011–12	League Two	10	1	5	0	0	0	2	0	17	1
Dartford	2012–13	Conference Premier	36	2	2	0	—		7 (Note: Six appearances in FA Trophy, one in Kent Senior Cup)	0	45	2
Whitehawk	2013–14	Conference South	17	0	0	0	—		0	0	17	0
Maidstone United (loan)	2013–14	Isthmian Premier Division	7	0	0	0	—		5 (Note: Three appearances in FA Trophy, two in Isthmian League Cup)	0	12	0
Career total			306	7	23	1	11	0	21	0	361	8

== Honours ==
Hereford United

- League Two: third place, 2007–08
