= Scott Tynan =

English footballer

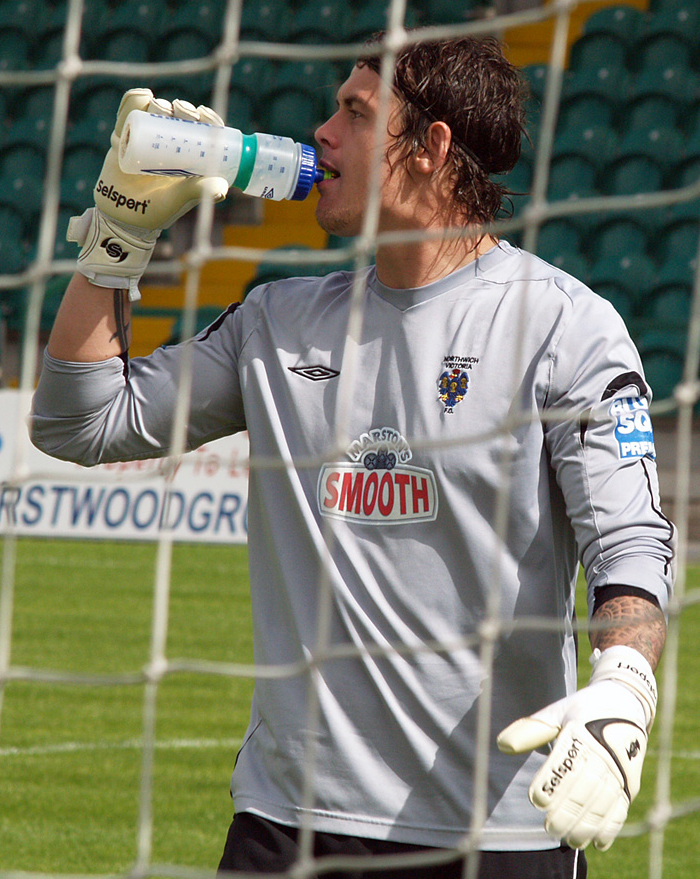
- Tynan playing for Northwich Victoria

Personal information
- Full name: Scott John Tynan
- Date of birth: 27 November 1983 (age 42)
- Place of birth: Liverpool, England
- Position: Goalkeeper

Senior career*
Years	Team	Apps	(Gls)
2001–2002	Wigan Athletic	1	(0)
2002–2004	Nottingham Forest	0	(0)
2003–2004	→ Telford United (loan)	3	(0)
2004–2006	Barnet	35	(0)
2006–2007	Rushden & Diamonds	55	(0)
2006	→ Hereford United (loan)	7	(0)
2007	Ebbsfleet United	7	(0)
2007–2010	Northwich Victoria	49	(0)
2010	Salford City		
2010–2012	Vauxhall Motors	57	(0)
2013–????	Billinge		

International career
2007–2008	England C	9	(0)
- * Club domestic league appearances and goals

Scott John Tynan (born 27 November 1983) is an English former footballer who played as a goalkeeper.

== Career ==
=== Wigan Athletic ===
Born in Liverpool, Merseyside, Scott began his career at Wigan Athletic during the 2001–02 season, providing backup for the first-team goalkeepers, featuring in the 1st team squad on 17 occasions despite his age, but he failed to make any significant backthrough into the first-team and was allowed to explore his options half way through his second season with club.

=== Nottingham Forest ===
In February 2002 he was invited to train with Nottingham Forest and subsequently played a huge role in their youth team's Dallas Cup success. In reward for his performances he was offered a contract through until the end of the 2003-04 season after negotiating his release from his Wigan Athletic contract. In total Scott spent two season with the club, again providing cover for the first-team and featuring heavily in the reserve team, but failing to make any appearances for the club outside of pre-season action, and left the club at the end of the 2003–04 season.

=== Telford United ===
During Tynan's time with Nottingham Forest, his lack of first team action prompted a loan move to Telford in order to get some experience, and Tynan enjoyed a two-month spell with the club, before returning to Nottingham Forest.

=== Barnet ===
Tynan joined Barnet in 2004 making 35 league appearances and gaining a Conference winner's medal.

=== Rushden & Diamonds ===
He signed for Rushden & Diamonds midway through the 2005–06 season for £20,000. In one of his first few games for the club, Tynan was approached by one of his own supporters who confronted the goalkeeper during an away match at Cheltenham Town in an incident that Tynan said was "blown out of proportion". The supporter was subsequently banned for life despite Tynan's statement in his defence. Despite for the most part enjoying his second season at Diamonds, Tynan requested his contract be cancelled by mutual consent after a mixture of becoming disillusioned by then manager Garry Hill and a desire to be closer to his home in Liverpool. That summer Tynan received his first call-up to the England C team to take part in the 4 Nations Tournament in Scotland. He made 3 appearances in their regaining of the trophy beating Wales in a fiery encounter in the final.

=== Hereford United ===
In August 2006, Tynan was loaned to Hereford United for a short spell as emergency goalkeeping cover for Wayne Brown who was injured in the opening game of the season against Stockport County. During this loan spell Tynan enjoyed a good run of form and played his part in some memorable games, most notably the 3–0 defeat of Coventry City in the League Cup. He had his contract cancelled by Rushden in May 2007 at his own request.

=== Ebbsfleet United ===
After a trial at Morecambe Tynan signed for Ebbsfleet United on 10 August 2007, a day before the new season, to cover for Lance Cronin who sustained a finger injury. He played seven games for the club, and achieving Man of the Match in 3 before leaving in September to find a club in the north-west. Tynan is said to have really enjoyed his time at Ebbsfleet but became frustrated with the amount of travelling involved in the short-term deal.

=== Northwich Victoria ===
Tynan signed for Northwich Victoria, making his debut against Exeter City on 13 October 2007. He moved to Salford City in February 2010. He went on to sign an 18-month contract and played a huge role in ensuring their survival. After an impressive first season Tynan gained an international re-call with the England C Team and helping them to retain the 4 Nations Tournament in Wales, making it the second time Tynan had won that particular competition before jetting off to Grenada and Barbados for a double header against their full international teams. With financial troubles impacting the club the following season and players being up to 4 months behind in wages at times, Scott decided to explore his options in the January and garnered interest from League 1 and even Championship clubs, as well as clubs abroad. Unfortunately he suffered a full thickness tear of his ACL in the league game against Histon which was played at Altrincham's ground due to Vics being locked out of their Marston's Arena home due to unpaid debts and as a result Northwich decided against renewing his contract.

=== Vauxhall Motors ===
Tynan joined Vauxhall Motors in the summer of 2010. He was part of their most successful season in recent times helping them reach the 1st round proper of the FA Cup in which they faced Hartlepool United who were then second in League 2. Tynan suffered a horrific leg injury late in the second half with the game at 0-0. The injury was caused by Richie Humphreys who as a result received his marching orders for the first time in his career. Tynan unfortunately missed the replay at Rivacre Park 2 weeks later where Motors were narrowly beaten.

=== Billinge FC ===
Tynan signs for Cheshire League Billinge FC February 2013 making his debut against Greenalls PSOB scored 3 goals from goal kicks in 2016
