= Jordan Fitzpatrick =

English footballer

Personal information
- Full name: Jordan Philip Fitzpatrick
- Date of birth: 15 June 1988 (age 38)
- Place of birth: Stourbridge, England
- Position: Centre midfielder

Team information
- Current team: Walsall Wood

Youth career
- 1998–2005: Wolverhampton Wanderers

Senior career*
Years	Team	Apps	(Gls)
2005–2006	Wolverhampton Wanderers	0	(0)
2006–2008	Hereford United	1	(0)
2008	→ Bromsgrove Rovers (loan)	4	(0)
2008–2010	Worcester City		
2010–2011	Redditch United		
2011	Corby Town		
2011–2012	Solihull Moors		
2012	→ Redditch United (loan)		
2012	Rushall Olympic		
2012–2015	Stourbridge		
2015–2017	Rushall Olympic		
2017	Hednesford Town		
2017–	Walsall Wood		
- * Club domestic league appearances and goals as of 16:00, 18 July 2019 (UTC)

Jordan Philip Fitzpatrick (born 15 June 1988) is an English footballer who plays for Walsall Wood as a midfielder. He played in the Football League for Hereford United, making one substitute appearance in Football League Two in 2007.

During his school years at Ridgewood High School, Stourbridge, he was involved in the most successful year of the school football team in 2004. The team completed a 'treble' by winning the league, cup and 6-a-side tournament. He started his career at Wolverhampton Wanderers at the age of 10, after being spotted playing for his district side. He played in the academy and at 16 was offered a two-year scholarship. He played for Wolves Reserves at the age of 15, as well as for the U17s and U19s. However, he did not make a first team appearance for the club. Notably he scored in the 2005 FA Youth Cup Semi Final only minutes after coming on as a substitute although the team eventually lost on penalties to Southampton. He was released by Wolves at the age of 18 and signed for Hereford United in September 2006, after a period training at Kidderminster.

He featured mainly for Hereford Reserves in the 2006–07 season, also featuring in the HFA Senior Cup. He made his league debut on the final day of the season, coming on as a substitute away at Torquay United. Fitzpatrick was loaned to Bromsgrove Rovers for a month on 27 March 2008. He was released by the Bulls on 19 May 2008, and joined Worcester City in August 2008. He signed for Worcester City on 6 August 2008. He signed for Redditch United at the start of the 2010–11 season.
