= Simon Travis =

English footballer (born 1977)

Personal information
- Full name: Simon Christopher Travis
- Date of birth: 22 March 1977 (age 49)
- Place of birth: Preston, England
- Positions: Full-back; wide midfielder

Senior career*
Years	Team	Apps	(Gls)
1995–1996	Torquay United	23	(0)
1997–1999	Stockport County	32	(2)
1999–2001	Telford United	72	(2)
2001–2002	Forest Green Rovers	35	(3)
2002–2004	Stevenage Borough	59	(1)
2004–2007	Hereford United	94	(2)
2007–2008	Nuneaton Borough	36	(1)
2008–2009	Solihull Moors	27	(0)
2009	Leamington	4	(0)
2009–2010	Brackley Town		

International career
2005–2006	England C	9	(0)
- * Club domestic league appearances and goals

Simon Travis (born 22 March 1977) is an English former professional footballer. He played on both the right and left sides in a full-back or midfield role, and was capped by the England C national football team under Paul Fairclough.

== Career ==
Travis started his career in the Football League with a season at Division Three side Torquay United. He then spent two seasons in Division One at Stockport. After leaving Stockport he spent a total of seven seasons in the Conference with Telford United, Forest Green Rovers and Stevenage, combining football with his studies at university. He joined Hereford in February 2004.

His signing coincided with the beginning of an 11-game unbeaten run in the Conference although the team missed out on promotion. The following season he was a regular at full-back and scored on the first day of the season. However the summer of 2005 was not a good time for Travis. Hereford went out of the playoffs in the semi-finals and then sustained a serious injury while playing for England in the Four Nations Tournament. He suffered a collapsed lung and broken ribs which put him out of action for several months. Once he returned he played a key role in a team that won promotion to the Football League via the playoffs, and played in the final, where Hereford defeated Halifax Town 3–2.

The 2006–07 season saw him compete for the right back position with Trent McClenahan, with Travis making more appearances over the course of the season. A proposed loan move to Stockport fell through in the second half of the season.

He spent the 2007–08 season at Nuneaton Borough, and when the club folded in the summer of 2008 he joined Solihull Moors. A year later spent a short period of time at Leamington, later playing for Brackley Town.

At the age of 46, Travis is considering a return to the professional game. Travis has been offered a 'pay as you play' deal with Banbury United FC in September 2023. When interviewed by the Banbury Guardian, Travis stated " I am absolutely thrilled to be making a return to the game. I am confident that despite my age, I will be able to hold my own with some of the young whippersnappers in the league - come on you Reds !! ". A source close to Travis stated that he has agreed the sum of £24 per game with United and an additional £3 for each win.
