= Dean Beckwith =

English footballer (born 1983)

Personal information
- Full name: Dean Stuart Beckwith
- Date of birth: 18 September 1983 (age 43)
- Place of birth: Southwark, England
- Height: 5 ft 6 in (1.68 m)
- Position: Centre back

Team information
- Current team: AFC Croydon Athletic (assistant manager)

Youth career
- –2003: Gillingham

Senior career*
Years	Team	Apps	(Gls)
2002	Tonbridge Angels	7	(0)
2003–2005	Gillingham	1	(0)
2003	→ Dagenham & Redbridge (loan)	4	(1)
2004	→ Margate (loan)	5	(0)
2005–2009	Hereford United	127	(5)
2009–2011	Northampton Town	75	(3)
2011–2013	Luton Town	16	(2)
2013–2015	Eastleigh	79	(3)
2015–2019	Sutton United	108	(7)
2018	→ Maidstone United (loan)	4	(0)
2019–2020	Havant & Waterlooville	0	(0)
2020–2021	Hythe Town	6	(1)
2021	Cray Wanderers	7	(1)
2021–2024	Chatham Town	46	(2)
2024–2025	Ashford United	2	(0)
Total		487	(25)
- * Club domestic league appearances and goals

Dean Stuart Beckwith (born 18 September 1983) is an English former semi-professional footballer who played as a central defender. He is assistant manager of AFC Croydon Athletic.

== Career ==
=== Early career ===
Beckwith was born in Southwark, London and came through the youth system at Gillingham. He turned professional in July 2003 but was to make only two first team appearances for the Gills. He went out on loan to Dagenham & Redbridge where he scored his first senior goal against his future club Hereford in a televised 1–1 draw at Edgar Street. He captained Gillingham reserves in the 2004–05 season and made his debut for the first team in the FA Cup defeat to Portsmouth. He also had a loan spell at Margate of the Conference South, making five appearances. After making his Football League debut on 5 March 2005 against Rotherham United, he was released at the end of the season.

=== Hereford United ===
He signed for Hereford on 12 July 2005 and scored on his league debut in the 4–0 win over Scarborough. As the season progressed he became a first team regular at centre-back and scored the equaliser in the 2–2 draw at Grays Athletic, preserving Hereford's then unbeaten run in the Conference. Promotion to the Football League followed at the end of the season, and Beckwith signed a new contract shortly after Hereford's playoff triumph.

With both Richard Rose and Phil Gulliver competing for places alongside captain Tamika Mkandawire, Beckwith made less appearances than in the previous season. He was also sent off twice in the season, his second red at Walsall was extremely questionable and prompted rare criticism of the referee by Graham Turner.

He was the first choice centre back in the 2007–08 season, starting 46 out of a possible 55 first team matches. A broken jaw sustained against Chester City sidelined him for six matches, and he made his 100th league appearance for Hereford in the 2–0 win over Wrexham. Third place and promotion was secured with a match to spare, and Beckwith remained with Hereford during their solitary season in League One. He got the Bulls off to an initial good start, scoring the opening goal of the season against Leyton Orient, but this was a rare highlight in a season that saw Hereford finish bottom.

Beckwith's last match for the Bulls saw him come on as a substitute against Northampton Town in a 2–1 defeat. At the end of the season newly appointed Hereford manager John Trewick chose not to offer Beckwith a new contract, stating that Beckwith was in need of a change of club.

Beckwith made a total of 153 appearances for Hereford United in the Conference, Football League, FA Cup, League Cup, FA Trophy, Football League Trophy and play-off matches. He scored five goals and was the final player of the 2006 play-off winning team to depart.

=== Northampton Town ===
On 29 June 2009, Beckwith joined Northampton Town and was released in 2011 after he made 75 appearances and 3 goals for the Cobblers.

=== Luton Town ===
On 14 June 2011, Beckwith became the second signing of the summer for Luton Town after Gary Brabin took over as full-time manager of the Hatters. He made his Luton debut on 17 August 2011 against Forest Green Rovers, scoring the equalising goal in a 1–1 draw. On 8 January 2013 Beckwith left Luton by mutual consent after 18 months with the Hatters. In total Beckwith, made 21 appearances in Luton colours, scoring two goals – including one in a 3–2 victory over Cambridge United in September 2012.

=== Eastleigh ===
On 8 January 2013, the day of his contract termination with Luton Town Beckwith signed for Eastleigh. He made his Eastleigh debut that day against Billericay Town, scoring the opening goal on his debut after just 8 minutes. He made a total of 79 appearances for Eastleigh and was part of the team which won the Conference South in 2013–14.

=== Sutton United ===
Beckwith moved to Sutton United at the start of the 2015–16 season. He made his debut on 8 August 2015 on the opening day defeat to Maidstone United, which Sutton lost 2–0. He scored his first league goal for the U's after heading in a cross from Ross Stearn in a 3–0 away victory against St Albans City on 5 March 2016. He made 36 full and one substitute league appearances and formed an important defensive partnership with fellow centre-back and captain Jamie Collins which helped the U's to only concede 32 league goals across the season, winning the National League South title and ending the season with a goal difference of +51. Beckwith was named in the National League South team of the season.

He scored his first goal with the newly promoted side in the National League in the opening day 3–1 home defeat to Solihull Moors on 6 August 2016. On 25 February 2017, Beckwith scored his second in a 3–2 away victory over Torquay United at Plainmoor.

Beckwith appeared in Sutton's historic run to the 5th round of the FA Cup for the first time ever, including a 3–1 victory over League One side and local rivals AFC Wimbledon in the 3rd round on 17 January 2017 and a 0–2 defeat to Premier League team Arsenal in the 5th round on 20 February.

He scored his first goal in Sutton's 2017-18 campaign in their opening match, a 2–0 win against Leyton Orient.

=== Maidstone United ===
On Thursday 8 February 2018 it was announced that Beckwith would join Maidstone united on a 1-month loan.

=== Havant & Waterlooville ===
In May 2019 it was confirmed, that Beckwith would join Havant & Waterlooville ahead of the 2019/20 season.

=== Further non-league ===
In May 2021, Beckwith joined Isthmian Premier Division side Cray Wanderers.

On 31 December 2021, Beckwith, along with former-Cray Wanderers player-manager Danny Kedwell, joined Southern Counties East Premier Division side Chatham Town.

== Coaching career ==
In May 2024, Beckwith was appointed assistant manager of Ashford United, once again assisting Danny Kedwell. He departed the club alongside Kedwell in January 2025.

In February 2025, Beckwith was appointed assistant manager to Kedwell once again, joining AFC Croydon Athletic.

== Honours ==
Eastleigh

- Conference South: 2013–14

Sutton United

- National League South: 2015–16

Chatham Town

- Isthmian League South East Division: 2022–23
