= Alex Jeannin =

French footballer (born 1977)

Personal information
- Full name: Alexandre Jeannin
- Date of birth: 30 December 1977 (age 48)
- Place of birth: Troyes, France
- Height: 6 ft 0 in (1.83 m)
- Position: Left back

Team information
- Current team: Weymouth

Senior career*
Years	Team	Apps	(Gls)
1997–1999	Troyes	2	(0)
1999–2000	Racing Club Paris	31	(0)
2000–2001	Troyes	1	(0)
2001	Darlington	22	(0)
2002–2003	RCS La Chapelle	10	(0)
2003–2005	Exeter City	92	(4)
2005	Bristol Rovers	1	(0)
2005–2007	Hereford United	60	(4)
2007–2008	Oxford United	28	(1)
2008	→ Kidderminster Harriers (loan)	18	(0)
2008–2009	Mansfield Town	31	(0)
2009–2011	Truro City	0	(0)
2011–2012	Weymouth	23	(0)
- * Club domestic league appearances and goals as of 5 September 2012

Alexandre 'Alex' Jeannin (born 30 December 1977) is a French former footballer.

== Football career ==
Jeannin began his career at local club Troyes, where he mainly played for the reserves in the fifth tier of French football. He made two first team appearances in Ligue 2 during the 1997–98 season. He then moved to Racing Club Paris where he played in the Championnat National

He started playing in England in the 2000-01 season when Darlington signed him from Troyes AC. However midway through the following season his contract was terminated. He had an unsuccessful trial with Carlisle United, appearing in a friendly against Celtic in September 2002. His next spell in English football was with Exeter City where he spent two seasons and was part of the team who played against Manchester United in the FA Cup before being released at the tail end of the 2004-05 season. After a very brief spell with Bristol Rovers where he played just one game, he joined Hereford United.

In Jeannin's first season at Hereford he started 52 matches, missing only 5, and scored 3 goals in all competitions, one notably on his 28th birthday when he scored a free-kick against one of his former clubs Exeter City, a moment that was televised live. He became quickly a fans' favorite. However his second season with the Bulls was less successful. After being named Player of the Month for November, and scoring against Torquay United, he was suddenly dropped after the away match at Shrewsbury Town. Thereafter he was overlooked from the starting XI for all first team matches for the rest of the season, he did come on as a sub for the injured Mkandawire away at Wycombe Wanderers; although he was the only recognised defender on the bench. On 30 April 2007 it was announced that he had left Hereford by mutual consent.

Jeannin also managed to hit the crossbar when Hereford participated in Soccer AM's Crossbar Challenge.

In January 2008, he joined Kidderminster Harriers on loan for three months.

He joined Mansfield Town in August 2008 where he managed to play 31 games. He was released at the end of season after a new manager showed him the door.

He suffered a broken leg on trial at Truro City but he was back in action at the start of the 2010/2011 season.

In December 2011, Jeannin signed for Southern League side Weymouth.

== Honours ==
=== As a player ===
Exeter City

- FA Devon St. Lukes Challenge Bowl (Incomplete) winner: 2003–04, 2004–05

Hereford United

- Conference National Play-Off Final winner: 2005–06
