= 1998–99 Gillingham F.C. season =

English football club season

Gillingham
1998–99 season
- Chairman: Paul Scally
- Manager: Tony Pulis
- Second Division: 4th
- FA Cup: First round
- League Cup: First round
- League Trophy: Southern section semi-final
- Top goalscorer: League: Carl Asaba (20); All: Carl Asaba (22)
- Highest home attendance: 10,400 (v Manchester City, 17 April 1999)
- Lowest home attendance: 4,575 (v Wycombe Wanderers, 10 October 1998)
Home colours	Away colours

During the 1998–99 English football season, Gillingham F.C. competed in the Football League Second Division, the third tier of the English football league system. It was the 67th season in which Gillingham competed in the Football League, and the 49th since the club was voted back into the league in 1950. The club signed two new forwards, each for a new club record transfer fee, but started the season in poor form, winning only one of the first eight league games. The team then went on a much-improved run, being undefeated for 17 league games, and began challenging for promotion to the Football League First Division. Gillingham finished the regular season in fourth place in the Second Division, qualifying for the play-offs for promotion to the First Division. After defeating Preston North End in the semi-finals, they played Manchester City at Wembley Stadium in the final. Gillingham were 2–0 up with less than ten minutes remaining but conceded two extremely late goals, and Manchester City won the subsequent penalty shoot-out to gain promotion.

Gillingham also reached the southern section semi-final of the Football League Trophy, but were eliminated from both the FA Cup and the Football League Cup in the first round. The team played 56 competitive matches, winning 26, drawing 16 (including the play-off final), and losing 14. Carl Asaba was the team's leading goalscorer with 22 goals. Paul Smith made the most appearances during the season, playing in 54 of the team's 56 matches. The highest attendance recorded at the club's home ground, Priestfield Stadium, was 10,400 for the visit of Manchester City. Despite leading the team to the play-off final, manager Tony Pulis was dismissed from his job shortly afterwards amid allegations of gross misconduct. He sued the club for unfair dismissal and accepted an out-of-court settlement.

== Background and pre-season ==
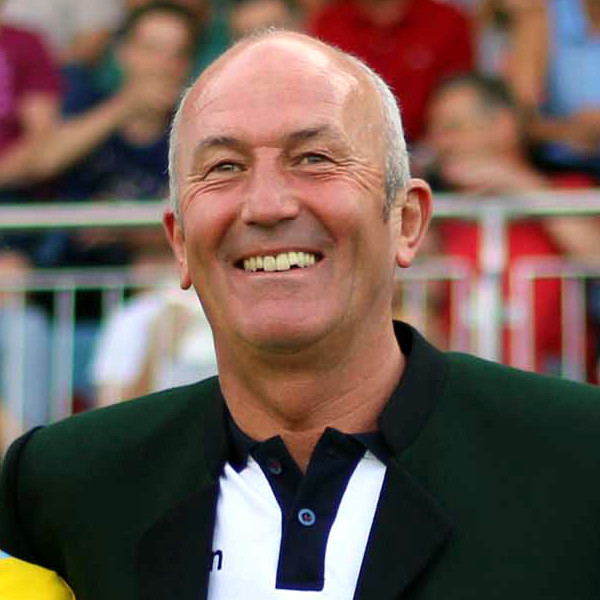
Gillingham manager Tony Pulis (pictured in 2014) was the club's manager for a fourth season.

The 1998–99 season was Gillingham's 67th in the Football League and the 49th since the club was elected back into the League in 1950 after being voted out in 1938. It was Gillingham's third consecutive season in the Football League Second Division, the third tier of the English football league system. The club had never reached the second level of English football in its history. In the previous season, Gillingham had finished eighth, tying on points with three other teams for the last two places in the play-offs for promotion to the First Division, but missing out, having scored the fewest goals of the four teams.

Tony Pulis served as manager for a fourth season, having been appointed in 1995 after chairman Paul Scally purchased the club. Andy Hessenthaler was the team's captain. There were significant changes to the playing squad ahead of the season, and the records for the highest transfer fees received and paid by Gillingham were both broken. Shortly after the end of the 1997–98 season, Jimmy Corbett, an attacking midfielder who had debuted in August 1997 at the age of 17, moved to FA Premier League club Blackburn Rovers for an initial fee of £525,000 (equivalent to £1.08 million in 2025); clauses in the contract meant that the fee had the potential to nearly double if Corbett played more than a specified number of games at the higher level. A succession of injuries, however, limited his playing time at Blackburn and Gillingham received no further money. In June, Ade Akinbiyi, the team's top goalscorer in the previous season, joined Bristol City of the First Division for £1.2 million (equivalent to £2.5 million in 2025), a new record for the highest transfer fee received by the club. Gillingham's record for the highest transfer fee paid out was broken by the signing of Robert Taylor from Brentford for a fee of £500,000 (equivalent to £1,030,000 in 2025). Gillingham also signed John Hodge from Walsall, and Mark Saunders and Paul Williams, both from Plymouth Argyle.

The club adopted a new first-choice kit, changing from plain blue shirts to blue and black stripes, a style previously worn in the 1995–96 season. In his programme notes for the first match of the season, Scally stated that the fact that the team had won promotion in that season wearing striped shirts was a factor in the decision to adopt them again. The away shirts, to be worn in the event of a clash of colours with the home team, were red and black stripes. The team prepared for the new season with a number of friendly matches, including one against Crystal Palace, who had played in the FA Premier League in the previous season.

== Second Division ==
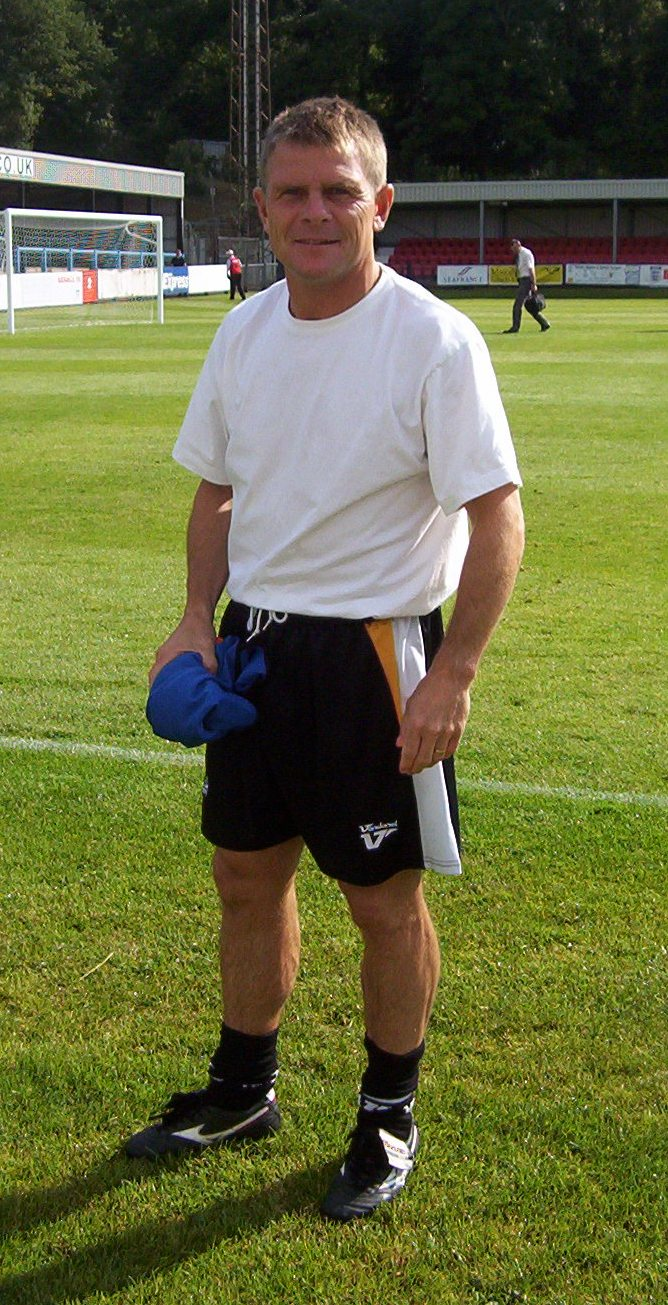
Andy Hessenthaler (pictured in 2009) captained Gillingham during the 1998–99 season.

=== August–December ===
Gillingham began the Second Division season with a home game against Walsall and lost 1–0. The next three games all resulted in draws, after which Gillingham were in 18th place in the 24-team league table. The goalless draw against Bristol Rovers was marred by a brawl involving almost every player on the pitch, after which Gillingham's Barry Ashby and Adrian Pennock were both sent off, along with two Rovers players. Forward Carl Asaba made his debut in the 2–2 draw away to Blackpool on 29 August, having joined the club the previous day from Reading for a fee of £600,000 (equivalent to £1.2 million in 2025), another new club record. Gillingham achieved their first victory of the season at the fifth attempt, defeating Wrexham 4–0; Asaba scored his first goal since joining the club and the result took the team up to 12th in the table. Gillingham then lost their next two games, however, and again dropped to 18th.

The 1–1 draw against Colchester United on 12 September marked the start of an unbeaten run which would last for the remainder of the year. Two weeks later, Gillingham drew 1–1 away to Preston North End; before the game the players were presented to Sepp Blatter, president of world football's governing body FIFA, who was in attendance to open the National Football Museum, located at Preston's Deepdale stadium. The following game, a 2–2 draw at home to Macclesfield Town, was preceded by the arrival by helicopter of the club's new mascot, Tommy T. Trewblu. Between 20 October and 10 November, Asaba scored in five consecutive games, four of which resulted in victories, taking his total number of league goals to ten. Taylor, however, had only scored three league goals and was receiving negative reactions from some Gillingham supporters, who considered him out of shape and his large transfer fee a waste of money.

On 21 November, Gillingham played away to Manchester City, who were playing in the third tier of the English football league system for the first time in their history. The match, the first between the two clubs since 1908, resulted in a 0–0 draw and drew a crowd of 26,529, by far the largest crowd to watch a game involving Gillingham during the regular 1998–99 league season. Asaba scored the team's first hat-trick of the season on 19 December in a 4–0 victory over Notts County. Gillingham ended 1998 with a 1–1 draw at home to Millwall in front of 9,221 fans, the season's largest attendance at Priestfield Stadium to date. It was Gillingham's 16th consecutive league game without defeat, and left them sixth in the table.

=== January–May ===
The team won their first game of 1999, defeating Blackpool 1–0 to extend their unbeaten league run to 17 games and move up to fifth place. Seven days later, however, Gillingham were defeated in the league for the first time since September, losing 2–1 away to Walsall. In each of the next three matches the team scored three goals, resulting in two wins and a draw, which kept Gillingham in the top six of the table.

On 20 February, Asaba scored Gillingham's goal in a 1–1 draw with Colchester United but was then sent off for apparently head-butting Colchester's David Greene. Two weeks later, however, the red card was overturned by a special commission convened by the Football Association, the sport's governing body in England, based on evidence provided by police officers present at the game. In the final game of February, Gillingham recorded their best-ever Football League win away from home when they beat Burnley 5–0 at Turf Moor; Taylor scored all five goals. It was the first time that a Gillingham player had scored as many goals in a single match since Fred Cheesmur scored six against Merthyr Town in 1930. In the following match, Taylor scored in the final minute to gain the team a draw against fellow promotion contenders Preston North End.

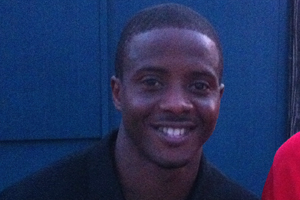
Kevin Lisbie (pictured in 2013) joined Gillingham on loan from Charlton Athletic in the latter portion of the season.

In March, Gillingham lost 4–1 to Wigan Athletic, the most goals conceded by the team in a single game during the season, but followed it up with a 4–0 win over Lincoln City. Kevin Lisbie, signed on loan from Charlton Athletic of the Premier League, scored in both games. Gillingham began the month of April with three consecutive victories; this included a win at home to Bournemouth with goals from Hessenthaler and Lisbie. The game was shown live by Sky TV, the first time the broadcaster had televised a game from Priestfield. After this run, Gillingham were fourth in the table, two places and three points below the automatic promotion positions. They then lost the next three games, however. Although Gillingham only dropped one position in the table as a result, they were now nine points below second place with three games remaining and a maximum of nine more points available. This run of defeats included Gillingham's first home defeat of the season, a 2–0 loss to Manchester City which drew an attendance of 10,400, the largest crowd to attend a match at Priestfield during the season. Gillingham defeated Oldham Athletic on 24 April and Stoke City a week later, scoring four goals each time. Four days after the second of these victories, Wigan Athletic lost to Wycombe Wanderers, meaning that Gillingham were guaranteed a place in the play-offs irrespective of the result of the final match of the regular season. Gillingham's final game resulted in a 1–0 win away against Notts County, Asaba scoring the only goal; this meant that they finished the regular season fourth in the table, seven points below second place.

=== Match details ===
Key

- In result column, Gillingham's score shown first
- H = Home match
- A = Away match
- pen. = Penalty kick
- o.g. = Own goal

Results
Date	Opponents	Result	Goalscorers	Attendance
8 August 1998	Walsall (H)	0–1		5,712
15 August 1998	York City (A)	1–1	Saunders	2,634
22 August 1998	Bristol Rovers (H)	0–0		4,896
29 August 1998	Blackpool (A)	2–2	Saunders, Carr	3,994
1 September 1998	Wrexham (H)	4–0	Smith, Hessenthaler (2), Asaba	5,349
5 September 1998	Chesterfield (A)	0–1		3,766
8 September 1998	Northampton Town (H)	2–3	Smith (2, 1 pen.)	5,072
12 September 1998	Colchester United (A)	1–1	Asaba	4,612
19 September 1998	Burnley (H)	2–1	Galloway, Taylor	5,702
26 September 1998	Preston North End (A)	1–1	Asaba	10,506
3 October 1998	Macclesfield Town (H)	2–2	Carr, Hodge	6,093
10 October 1998	Wycombe Wanderers (H)	3–0	Saunders, Taylor (2)	4,575
17 October 1998	Reading (A)	0–0		11,467
20 October 1998	AFC Bournemouth (A)	3–3	Asaba (2), Southall	5,183
24 October 1998	Luton Town (H)	1–0	Asaba	5,602
31 October 1998	Lincoln City (A)	2–1	Asaba (2)	4,366
7 November 1998	Wigan Athletic (H)	2–0	Asaba, Balmer (o.g.)	5,869
10 November 1998	Oldham Athletic (H)	2–1	Asaba, Patterson	5,188
21 November 1998	Manchester City (A)	0–0		26,529
28 November 1998	Fulham (H)	1–0	Taylor	7,614
12 December 1998	Stoke City (A)	0–0		17,233
19 December 1998	Notts County (H)	4–0	Asaba (3), Taylor	6,072
29 December 1998	Millwall (H)	1–1	Galloway	9,221
2 January 1999	Blackpool (H)	1–0	Southall	7,022
9 January 1999	Walsall (A)	1–2	Patterson	5,495
16 January 1999	York City (H)	3–1	Asaba, Taylor, Butters	6,242
30 January 1999	Millwall (A)	3–3	Southall, Taylor, Saunders	10,442
6 February 1999	Chesterfield (H)	3–1	Asaba, Hessenthaler, Southall	6,582
13 February 1999	Northampton Town (A)	1–0	Smith	5,981
20 February 1999	Colchester United (H)	1–1	Asaba	7,276
23 February 1999	Bristol Rovers (A)	1–0	Hessenthaler	5,735
27 February 1999	Burnley (A)	5–0	Taylor (5, 1 pen.)	8,981
6 March 1999	Preston North End (H)	1–1	Taylor	9,581
9 March 1999	Macclesfield Town (A)	0–1		1,868
13 March 1999	Wigan Athletic (A)	1–4	Lisbie	4,248
20 March 1999	Lincoln City (H)	4–0	Hessenthaler (2), Lisbie (2)	7,023
27 March 1999	Luton Town (A)	0–1		6,705
1 April 1999	Reading (H)	2–1	Saunders, Asaba	8,195
5 April 1999	Wycombe Wanderers (A)	2–0	Ashby, Asaba	6,688
9 April 1999	AFC Bournemouth (H)	2–1	Hessenthaler, Lisbie	7,813
13 April 1999	Fulham (A)	0–3		13,119
17 April 1999	Manchester City (H)	0–2		10,400
20 April 1999	Wrexham (A)	1–2	Butters	1,871
24 April 1999	Oldham Athletic (A)	4–1	Asaba, Smith, Galloway, Taylor	5,331
1 May 1999	Stoke City (H)	4–0	Taylor (2), Butters, Smith	8,289
8 May 1999	Notts County (A)	1–0	Asaba	7,815

=== Partial league table ===
Football League Second Division final table, leading positions
Pos	Team	Pld	W	D	L	GF	GA	GD	Pts	Promotion or relegation
1	Fulham	46	31	8	7	79	32	+47	101	Division Champions, promoted
2	Walsall	46	26	9	11	63	47	+16	87	Promoted
3	Manchester City	46	22	16	8	69	33	+36	82	Participated in play-offs
4	Gillingham	46	22	14	10	75	44	+31	80	Participated in play-offs
5	Preston North End	46	22	13	11	78	50	+28	79	Participated in play-offs
6	Wigan Athletic	46	22	10	14	75	48	+27	76	Participated in play-offs

=== Play-offs ===
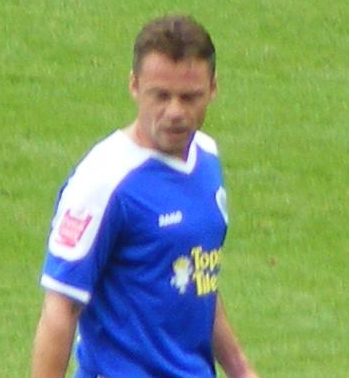
Manchester City's Paul Dickov (pictured in 2008) scored a late equalising goal in the play-off final.

In the play-off semi-finals, Gillingham played fifth-place finishers Preston North End. In the first match of the two-legged tie, David Eyres put Preston ahead in the 54th minute. Taylor equalised with 11 minutes remaining and the match ended 1–1. The second leg was held three days later at Priestfield. Gillingham took the lead through Hessenthaler less than two minutes into the match. Having been largely thwarted by the Gillingham defence in the opening 45 minutes, Preston had more goalscoring chances in the second half; goalkeeper Vince Bartram dived full-length across his goal to keep out a shot from Jon Macken. The match ended 1–0 and Gillingham progressed to the final with a 2–1 aggregate victory.

In the final Gillingham played Manchester City, who had defeated Wigan Athletic in the other semi-final. It was the first time Gillingham had played at Wembley Stadium, England's national stadium. The match was scoreless until the 81st minute, when Asaba gave Gillingham the lead. Taylor added a second goal five minutes later. Kevin Horlock scored for City in the 90th minute to halve the deficit and, in the fifth minute of injury time, Paul Dickov scored an equaliser to make the score 2–2 and send the game into extra time. With no further goals being scored, the match was decided by a penalty shoot-out, which City won 3–1 to gain promotion.

=== Match details ===
Key

- In result column, Gillingham's score shown first
- H = Home match
- A = Away match
- N = Match played at a neutral venue
- pen. = Penalty kick
- o.g. = Own goal

Results
Date	Round	Opponents	Result	Goalscorers	Attendance
16 May 1999	Semi-final (first leg)	Preston North End (A)	1–1	Taylor	18,584
19 May 1999	Semi-final (second leg)	Preston North End (H)	1–0	Hessenthaler	10,505
30 May 1999	Final	Manchester City (N)	2–2 (a.e.t.)	Asaba, Taylor	76,935

== Cup matches ==
=== FA Cup ===
As a Second Division team, Gillingham entered the 1998–99 FA Cup in the first round and were drawn to play fellow Second Division team Oldham Athletic. Gillingham lost 2–0 and were thus eliminated from the competition.

==== Match details ====
Key

- In result column, Gillingham's score shown first
- H = Home match
- A = Away match
- pen. = Penalty kick
- o.g. = Own goal

Results
Date	Round	Opponents	Result	Goalscorers	Attendance
14 November 1998	First	Oldham Athletic (A)	0–2		3,173

=== Football League Cup ===
As a Second Division team, Gillingham entered the 1998–99 Football League Cup in the first round and were paired with Southend United of the Third Division. Gillingham lost both legs of the tie 1–0.

==== Match details ====
Key

- In result column, Gillingham's score shown first
- H = Home match
- A = Away match
- pen. = Penalty kick
- o.g. = Own goal

Results
Date	Round	Opponents	Result	Goalscorers	Attendance
11 August 1998	First (first leg)	Southend United (A)	0–1		2,509
18 August 1998	First (second leg)	Southend United (H)	0–1		3,417

=== Football League Trophy ===
In the first round of the 1998–99 Football League Trophy, a competition for Second and Third Division teams, Gillingham played Colchester United. Goals from Asaba, Pennock and Paul Smith and two from Taylor resulted in a 5–1 victory. In the second round, Gillingham defeated Swansea City 1–0 and then beat Torquay United by the same score in the third round. This secured the team a place in the semi-final of the southern section of the competition; their opponents were Millwall. In front of a crowd of 11,555 at Millwall's The New Den, Gillingham lost 1–0 and were eliminated from the competition.

==== Match details ====
Key

- In result column, Gillingham's score shown first
- H = Home match
- A = Away match
- pen. = Penalty kick
- o.g. = Own goal

Results
Date	Round	Opponents	Result	Goalscorers	Attendance
5 December 1998	First	Colchester United (A)	5–1	Asaba, Pennock, Taylor (2), Smith	1,742
5 January 1999	Second	Swansea City (A)	1–0	Hessenthaler	5,126
23 January 1999	Third	Torquay United (A)	1–0	Taylor	3,121
16 February 1999	Semi-final (southern section)	Millwall (A)	0–1		11,555

== Players ==
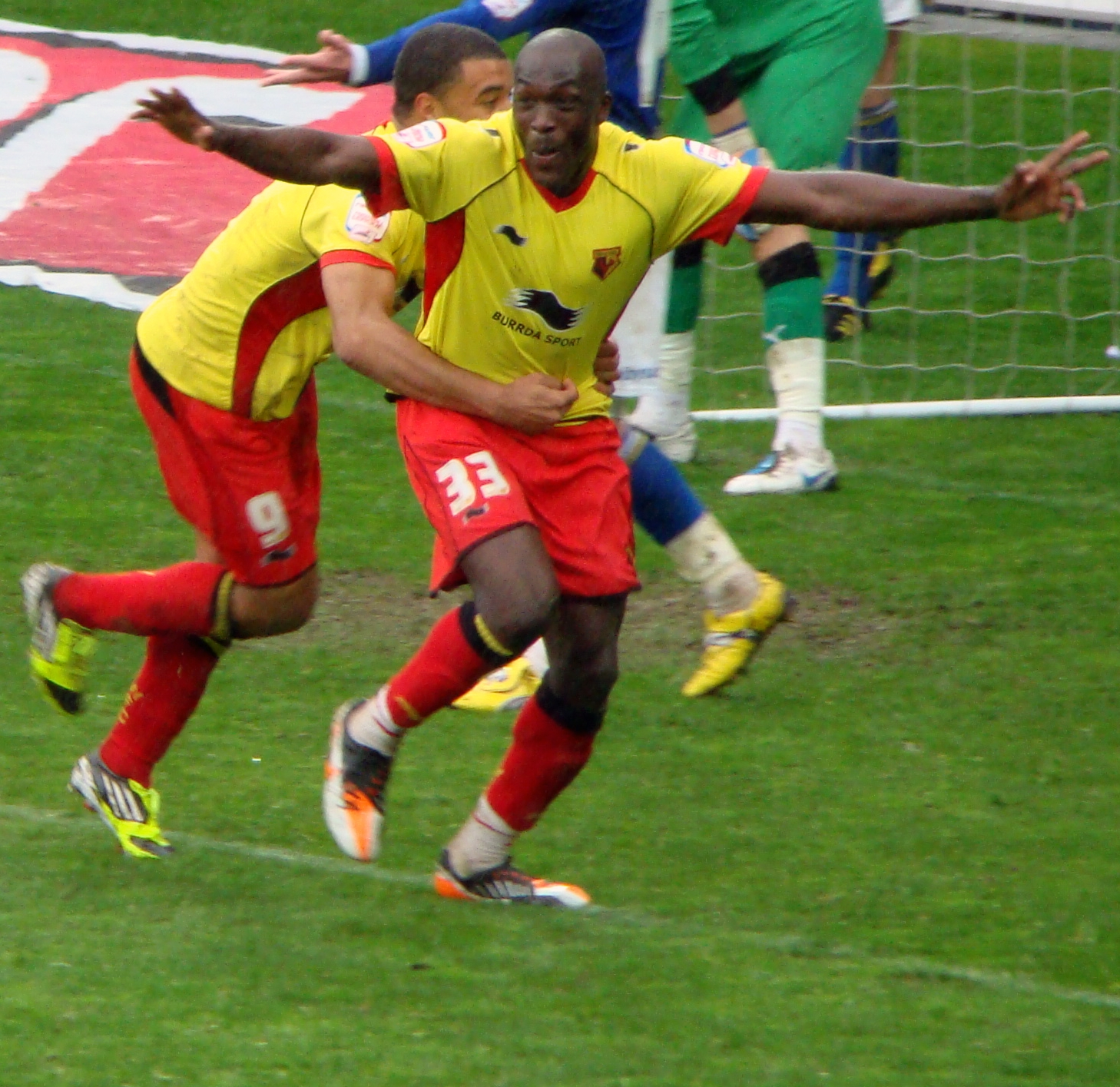
Nyron Nosworthy (pictured in 2012) made his debut during the season and would go on to play 200 games for Gillingham.

Smith made the most appearances for Gillingham during the season, playing in 54 of the team's 56 matches; he missed only one Second Division game and one match in the League Trophy. Three other players made over 50 appearances; Bartram played 53 times and both Southall and Taylor 51 times. Two players made only a single appearance during the season. Brian Statham was restricted to one game in the 1998–99 season although he had played 23 games in the season before. The one game in which French defender Franck Rolling played, however, was the only appearance of his Gillingham career.

Asaba was the team's leading goalscorer during the season. He scored 20 times in the Second Division during the regular season, once in the play-offs, and once in the League Trophy for a total of 22 in all competitions. Taylor scored 16 goals in the Second Division and 21 overall. No other player reached double figures.

Player statistics
Player	Position	Second Division		Play-offs		FA Cup		League Cup		League Trophy		Total	
Player	Position	Apps	Goals	Apps	Goals	Apps	Goals	Apps	Goals	Apps	Goals	Apps	Goals
Carl Asaba	FW	41	20	3	1	1	0	0	0	4	1	49	22
Barry Ashby	DF	38	1	3	0	1	0	2	0	2	0	46	1
Vince Bartram	GK	44	0	3	0	0	0	2	0	4	0	53	0
Kenny Brown	DF	4	0	1	0	0	0	0	0	0	0	5	0
Marcus Browning	MF	4	0	0	0	0	0	0	0	0	0	4	0
Matt Bryant	DF	23	0	0	0	1	0	1	0	3	0	28	0
Steve Butler	FW	7	0	0	0	0	0	1	0	0	0	8	0
Guy Butters	DF	23	3	3	0	0	0	0	0	4	0	30	3
Darren Carr	DF	30	2	1	0	1	0	2	0	2	0	36	2
Tony Dobson	DF	2	0	0	0	0	0	0	0	0	0	2	0
Roland Edge	DF	8	0	0	0	1	0	0	0	2	0	11	0
Stuart Elliott	MF	5	0	0	0	0	0	0	0	0	0	5	0
Mick Galloway	MF	25	3	3	0	1	0	1	0	2	0	32	3
Andy Hessenthaler	MF	39	7	3	1	1	0	2	0	2	1	47	9
John Hodge	FW	34	1	3	0	1	0	2	0	3	0	43	1
Kevin Lisbie	FW	7	4	0	0	0	0	0	0	0	0	7	4
Nyron Nosworthy	DF	3	0	0	0	0	0	0	0	1	0	4	0
Mark Patterson	DF	42	2	3	0	1	0	2	0	1	0	49	2
Adrian Pennock	DF	40	0	3	0	1	0	1	0	3	1	48	1
James Pinnock	FW	4	0	0	0	0	0	2	0	2	0	8	0
Franck Rolling	DF	1	0	0	0	0	0	0	0	0	0	1	0
Mark Saunders	MF	34	5	3	0	0	0	0	0	3	0	40	5
Paul Smith	MF	45	6	3	0	1	0	2	0	3	1	54	7
Nicky Southall	MF	42	4	3	0	1	0	1	0	4	0	51	4
Jim Stannard	GK	2	0	0	0	1	0	0	0	0	0	3	0
Brian Statham	DF	0	0	0	0	0	0	0	0	1	0	1	0
Robert Taylor	FW	43	16	3	2	1	0	1	0	3	3	51	21
Paul Williams	DF	10	0	0	0	0	0	2	0	0	0	12	0

FW = Forward, MF = Midfielder, GK = Goalkeeper, DF = Defender

== Aftermath ==
One month after the play-off final, Pulis was dismissed from his job as the club's manager, amid accusations of gross misconduct on his part, a decision which led to a lengthy and acrimonious court case between him and Scally. The relationship between the two had deteriorated during the 1998–99 season, in particular following an interview with local newspaper Kent Today, which quoted Scally as saying that being a manager was an "easy job". Following the interview, which Scally said misquoted him, the paper's reporters were banned from Priestfield Stadium for more than five years. Pulis brought a case against the club for unfair dismissal and ultimately accepted an out-of-court settlement of £75,000 (equivalent to £141,000 in 2025).

Peter Taylor was appointed as the club's new manager. Gillingham again challenged for promotion in the 1999–2000 season; on the last day of the regular season, the team had a chance to gain automatic promotion, but lost and instead had to again enter the play-offs. After defeating Stoke City in the semi-finals, Gillingham beat Wigan Athletic in the final to gain promotion to the second tier of the English football league system for the first time in the club's history.
