= 1999 Football League Second Division play-off final =

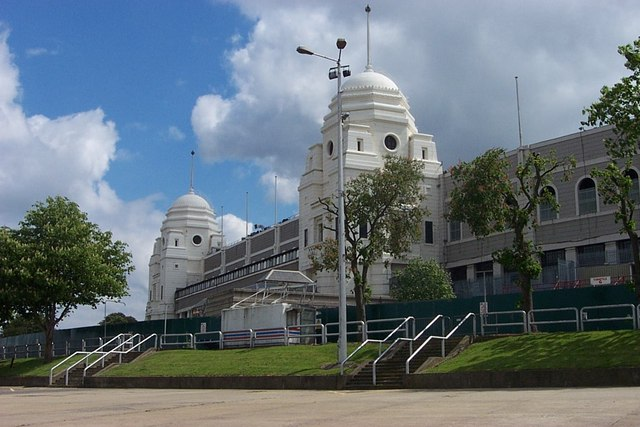
- The final took place at Wembley Stadium (pictured in 2002).
Manchester City	Gillingham
2	2
- Manchester City won 3–1 on penalties
- Date: 30 May 1999
- Venue: Wembley Stadium, London
- Referee: Mark Halsey (Welwyn Garden City)
- Attendance: 76,935

The 1999 Football League Second Division play-off final was an association football match which was played on 30 May 1999 at Wembley Stadium, London, between Manchester City and Gillingham. The match was to determine the third and final team to gain promotion from the Football League Second Division, the third tier of English football, to the First Division. The top two teams of the 1998–99 Football League Second Division season gained automatic promotion to the First Division, while the clubs placed from third to sixth in the table took part in play-offs. Manchester City ended the season in third position while Gillingham were fourth. The winners of these semi-finals competed for the final place in the First Division for the 1999–2000 season. In the semi-finals, Gillingham defeated Preston North End and Manchester City beat Wigan Athletic.

It was Gillingham's first match at Wembley Stadium, although Manchester City had played there on eleven previous occasions. The final drew a crowd of just under 77,000, the largest crowd to ever witness a Gillingham match, and was refereed by Mark Halsey. The match was scoreless until the 81st minute, when Carl Asaba gave Gillingham the lead. Robert Taylor added a second goal five minutes later. Kevin Horlock scored for City in the 90th minute to halve the deficit and, in the fifth minute of injury time, Paul Dickov scored an equaliser to make the score 2–2 and send the game into extra time. With no further goals being scored, the match was decided by a penalty shoot-out, which City won 3–1 to gain promotion.

Manchester City's next season saw them secure automatic promotion to the FA Premier League after ending their campaign as runners-up. Gillingham finished their following season in third place in the Second Division and qualified for the play-offs again, where they secured promotion to the First Division with a 3–2 victory against Wigan Athletic in the final.

== Route to the final ==
Football League Second Division final table, leading positions
Pos	Team	Pld	W	D	L	GF	GA	GD	Pts
1	Fulham	46	31	8	7	79	32	+47	101
2	Walsall	46	26	9	11	63	47	+16	87
3	Manchester City	46	22	16	8	69	33	+36	82
4	Gillingham	46	22	14	10	75	44	+31	80
5	Preston North End	46	22	13	11	77	50	+27	79
6	Wigan Athletic	46	22	10	14	75	48	+27	76

The teams finishing in the top two positions in the Second Division, the third tier of the English football league system, in the 1998–99 Football League season gained automatic promotion to the First Division. The teams finishing between third and sixth inclusive competed in the play-offs for the third and final promotion place. Manchester City finished the regular season in third place, two points ahead of fourth-placed Gillingham. Both therefore missed out on the two automatic places for promotion to the First Division and instead took part in the play-offs, along with Preston North End and Wigan Athletic, to determine the third promoted team. Manchester City finished five points behind Walsall (who were promoted in second place) and nineteen behind league winners Fulham.

Gillingham's opponents for their play-off semi-final were Preston North End, with the first match of the two-legged tie taking place at Deepdale in Preston on 16 May 1999. After a goalless first half, David Eyres put Preston ahead in the 54th minute. Robert Taylor equalised with 11 minutes to go and the match ended 1–1. The second leg was held three days later at Priestfield Stadium in Gillingham. Within two minutes of the start of the match, Gillingham took the lead through Andy Hessenthaler: Barry Ashby passed to Carl Asaba who guided the ball to Hessenthaler to score. Gillingham dominated the remainder of the half and, despite pressure from Preston after the interval, they held onto their lead; Vince Bartram, the Gillingham goalkeeper, dived full-length across his goal to keep out a strike from Jon Macken. The match ended 1–0 and Gillingham progressed to the final with a 2–1 aggregate victory.

Manchester City faced Wigan Athletic in their semi-final and the first leg was played at Springfield Park in Wigan on 15 May 1999. Within 20 seconds, the home side had taken the lead: a misunderstanding between Manchester City goalkeeper Nicky Weaver and his team-mate Gerard Wiekens allowed Stuart Barlow to score from 15 yards (14 m). Paul Dickov equalised with 13 minutes of the match remaining and the game ended 1–1. The second leg took place four days later at Maine Road in Manchester. City dominated the early stages and took the lead in the 27th minute through Shaun Goater, who put the ball past Roy Carroll in the Wigan goal with his chest from a Michael Brown cross. With four minutes remaining, a shot by Wigan's Graeme Jones struck the crossbar. The match ended 1–0 and Manchester City progressed to the final 2–1 on aggregate.

Manchester City				Gillingham
Opponent	Result	Legs	Round	Opponent	Result	Legs
Wigan Athletic	2–1	1–1 away; 1–0 home	Semi-finals	Preston North End	2–1	1–1 away; 1–0 home

== Match ==
=== Background ===
The match was Gillingham's first appearance at Wembley Stadium, the country's national stadium and the venue reserved for major tournament finals since 1923. Manchester City, by comparison, had played there on eleven previous occasions in FA Cup and League Cup finals. Gillingham were aiming to reach the second tier of English football for the first time in their history, whereas their opponents had spent more than 100 seasons in the top two tiers and had played in the top-level FA Premier League as recently as the 1995–96 season. At the end of the 1997–98 season, City had been relegated to the third tier of English football for the first time.

This season saw the first competitive matches between the sides: the first game, at Maine Road in November 1998, ended in a goalless draw while the return match played at Priestfield the following April ended in a 2–0 victory for Manchester City. Asaba was the season's top scorer for Gillingham with 22 goals (20 in the league and 2 in the Football League Trophy) followed by Taylor, who scored 19 goals in the regular season (16 in the league and 3 in the Football League Trophy). Manchester City's Goater was leading scorer for his side, with 20 goals (17 in the league, 1 in the FA Cup and 2 in the League Cup) followed by Dickov on 13 (10 in the league, 1 in the FA Cup and 2 in the League Cup) and Kevin Horlock with 10 (all in the league).

Gillingham manager Tony Pulis picked the same eleven players in his starting line-up as in the second leg of the semi-final. His opposite number, Joe Royle, made one change, selecting Andy Morrison in place of Tony Vaughan, who was instead named as one of the substitutes. The referee for the match was Mark Halsey, from Welwyn Garden City. The play-off final drew an attendance of 76,935, the largest crowd ever to watch a Gillingham match. It was a new record attendance for the third-tier play-off final and a larger attendance than that for the First Division play-off final the following day. Liam and Noel Gallagher of the rock band Oasis were among the Manchester City fans in attendance.

=== Summary ===
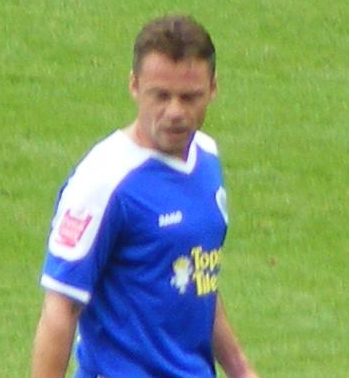
Paul Dickov (pictured in 2008) scored the equalising goal five minutes into injury time.

The match kicked off at around 3.00 p.m. on 30 May 1999. In the first minute, Dickov's overhead kick struck Ashby's hand in the Gillingham penalty area but referee Halsey did not award a penalty kick. Goater then saw his shot hit the Gillingham goalpost. Gillingham's first goal-scoring chance came from Mick Galloway, who had a shot from close range saved by a diving Weaver. After 26 minutes, City's Terry Cooke crossed the ball into the penalty area, where Horlock headed it towards goal, but it was saved by Gillingham's Bartram. Both teams had further goal-scoring opportunities in the second half. For Gillingham, Nicky Southall crossed the ball to Mark Saunders, but his shot went wide of the goal, and Asaba was tackled by City's Ian Bishop when in a potential scoring position. After 70 minutes, Weaver saved a strongly-hit shot from Gillingham's Paul Smith, and five minutes later Cooke was again involved for City, as he set up Goater, whose shot went past Bartram but hit the goalpost. The BBC characterised much of the match as "ordinary" and suggested that both teams were somewhat overawed by the high-profile setting.

The match remained scoreless until the 81st minute, when Asaba gave Gillingham the lead. He played a one-two with Smith before shooting past Weaver from around 15 yards (14 m). Taylor added a second goal five minutes later: he found Asaba with a header and received a backheeled return pass before scoring with a shot. With only a minute of normal time left, and two goals behind in the game, many City fans considered that the game had been lost and began to make their way to the exits. However, after Darren Carr had tackled Goater to deny him a goal-scoring opportunity, Horlock scored from the rebound for City to halve the deficit in the 90th minute. In the fifth minute of injury time, Wiekens punted the ball forward, Horlock and Goater helped it on to Dickov who scored an equalising goal. The regulation 90 minutes ended moments later, and with the scores level the game went into extra time. Dickov saw his header gathered by Bartram and although Hodge's cross was blocked by Jeff Whitley's hand, no penalty was awarded. With no goals being scored in the additional 30 minutes, the match and promotion to the First Division would be decided by a penalty shoot-out.

Horlock scored the opening penalty for Manchester City before Weaver saved Smith's spot kick. Dickov missed his penalty after it struck both posts, but Adrian Pennock then missed for Gillingham. Cooke made it 2–0 to City before John Hodge scored for Gillingham. Richard Edghill scored for City to make the score 3–1, meaning that City would win if Guy Butters failed to score with Gillingham's fourth penalty. Weaver saved the defender's kick to give Manchester City victory and secure promotion to the First Division.

=== Details ===
30 May 1999
15:00 BST

Manchester City	2–2 (a.e.t.)	Gillingham
Horlock 90'; Dickov 90+5'	Report	Asaba 81'; Taylor 87'
Penalties
Horlock (penalty scored); Dickov (penalty missed); Cooke (penalty scored); Edghill (penalty scored)	3–1	(penalty missed) Smith; (penalty missed) Pennock; (penalty scored) Hodge; (penalty missed) Butters

Wembley Stadium, London
Attendance: 76,935
Referee: Mark Halsey (Lancashire)

Manchester City	Gillingham

GK	1	Nicky Weaver
RB	2	Lee Crooks		(substituted off) 85'
LB	3	Richard Edghill
CB	4	Gerard Wiekens	Booked
CB	5	Andy Morrison (c)		(substituted off) 61'
LM	6	Kevin Horlock
CM	7	Michael Brown		(substituted off) 61'
CM	8	Jeff Whitley
CF	9	Paul Dickov
CF	10	Shaun Goater
RM	11	Terry Cooke
Substitutes:
FW	12	Gareth Taylor	Booked	(substituted on) 85'
DF	13	Tony Vaughan		(substituted on) 61'
MF	14	Ian Bishop		(substituted on) 61'
Manager:
Joe Royle

GK	1	Vince Bartram
RWB	2	Nicky Southall
CB	3	Barry Ashby
CM	4	Paul Smith
CB	5	Guy Butters
CB	6	Adrian Pennock
LWB	7	Mark Patterson		(substituted off) 105'
CM	8	Andy Hessenthaler (c)
CF	9	Carl Asaba		(substituted off) 87'
CM	10	Mick Galloway		(substituted off) 56'
CF	11	Robert Taylor	Booked
Substitutes:
MF	12	John Hodge		(substituted on) 105'
MF	13	Mark Saunders		(substituted on) 56'
DF	14	Darren Carr	Booked	(substituted on) 87'
Manager:
Tony Pulis

== Post-match ==
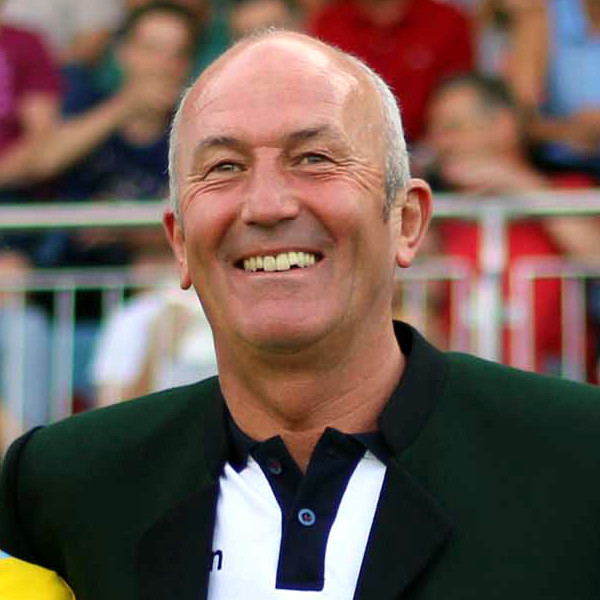
Gillingham manager Tony Pulis (pictured in 2014) was dismissed from his job in controversial circumstances one month after the final.

Gillingham manager Pulis was bemused by the amount of time added on by referee Halsey, stating that he "could not believe" the decision to add an additional five minutes. One month after the 1999 final, Pulis was dismissed from his job at Gillingham, amid accusations of gross misconduct on his part, a decision which led to a lengthy and acrimonious court case between Pulis and club owner Paul Scally. Scally was charged with misconduct by the Football Association (the FA), the governing body of the sport in England, after it emerged that he had placed a series of bets on the play-off final in contravention of the rules governing individuals gambling on matches in which they had a vested interest. He appeared at an FA tribunal the following year and was fined £10,000.

Manchester City's next season saw them secure automatic promotion to the FA Premier League after ending their campaign as runners-up. Gillingham, under new manager Peter Taylor, returned to the play-offs in their following season, finishing in third place in the Second Division. They secured promotion to the First Division with a 3–2 victory against Wigan Athletic in the final.

Looking back on the match in 2011, Pulis stated that "[Gillingham] didn't deserve to lose that game ... But it made me a much stronger person. You take things out of defeat as well as victory". Manchester City's 1999 captain, Morrison, contended in 2018 that the club was at risk of going out of business within a year, if not for their match-winning promotion out of the Second Division. Twenty years after the match, Dickov recalled scoring the equalising goal past his friend and the best man at his wedding, Gillingham goalkeeper Bartram: "There is nothing better than getting one over your mate or reminding him of it a few years later". As a result of the subsequent success of the club, the Manchester Evening News described the match as "legendary in City's history" and Dickov's celebration of his goal as "iconic". In 2017, the English Football League (formerly The Football League) described the 1999 final as a "play-off classic". Manchester City fans and other commentators regard the game as a crucial first step in the club's revival from the third tier of English football to yearly contenders for the Premier League championship.
