= History of Gillingham F.C. =

History of an English football club

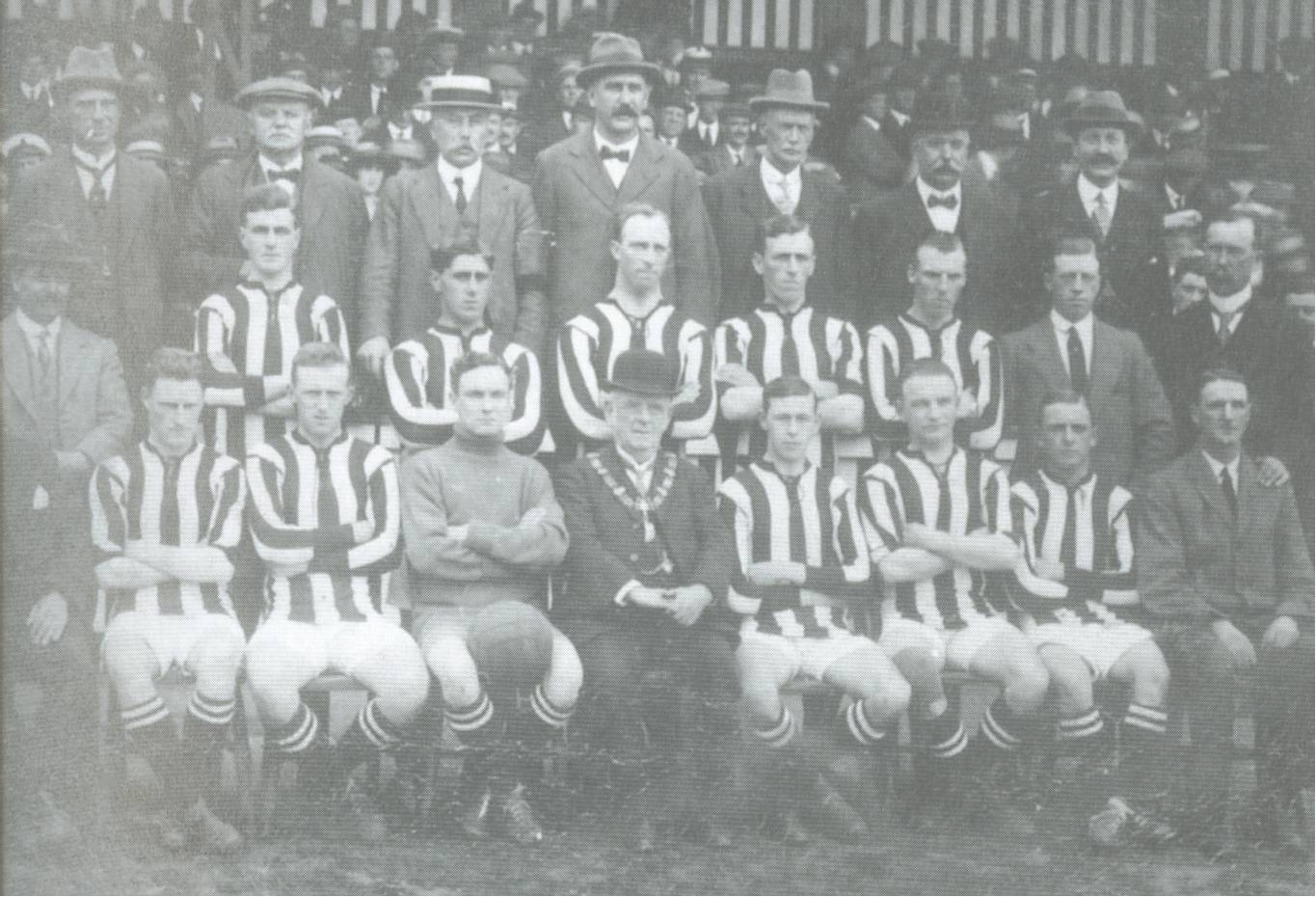
The Gillingham team line up before their first ever Football League match in 1920

Gillingham Football Club is an English football club based in Gillingham, Kent. The club was formed in 1893, and played in the Southern League until 1920, when that league's top division was absorbed into the Football League as its new Division Three. The club was voted out of the league in favour of Ipswich Town at the end of the 1937–38 season, but returned 12 years later, when that league was expanded from 88 to 92 clubs. Twice in the late 1980s Gillingham came close to winning promotion to the second tier of English football, but a decline then set in and in 1993 the club narrowly avoided relegation to the Football Conference. In 2000, the "Gills" reached the second tier of the English league for the first time in the club's history and went on to spend five seasons at this level, achieving a club record highest league finish of eleventh place in 2002–03. The club has twice won the division comprising the fourth level of English football: the Football League Fourth Division championship in 1963–64 and the Football League Two championship in 2012–13.

== Early years: 1893–1920 ==
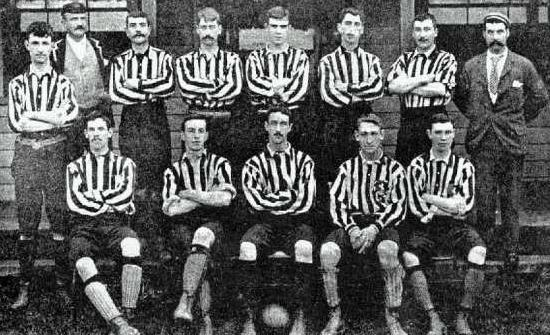
The New Brompton team of 1894

The local success of a junior football side, Chatham Excelsior F.C., encouraged a group of businessmen to meet at the Napier Arms pub on 18 May 1893, with a view to creating a football club that could compete in larger competitions. To do this, the club required an enclosed playing area where an admission fee could be charged, which Excelsior lacked. New Brompton F.C. was formed at the meeting, incorporating a number of Excelsior players. The group also purchased the plot of land which would later become Priestfield Stadium, where a pitch was quickly laid and a pavilion constructed. New Brompton's first team played their first match on 2 September 1893, with the new team, sporting Excelsior's black and white stripes, being defeated 5–1 by Woolwich Arsenal's reserve team in front of a crowd of 2,000. As a "curtain-raiser" immediately prior to this match, New Brompton's own reserves played a match against Grays, which was therefore technically the first match played by a team representing the club.

New Brompton joined the Southern League upon its creation in 1894, being placed in Division Two because it was one of the last clubs to be invited to join the league. Upon joining the league, New Brompton turned professional, with the players agreeing to be paid 12 shillings per match, and promptly won the Division Two championship in the 1894–95 season. With a record of one defeat and eleven victories from twelve matches, the team concluded the season with a "test match" against Swindon Town, who had finished bottom of Division One. As 5–1 winners, New Brompton gained promotion to Division One the following season. In 1896 the club appointed its first manager when William Ironside Groombridge, who had previously served as the club's financial secretary, took charge of team affairs. Groombridge served the club, as secretary and sometimes manager, until well after the First World War.

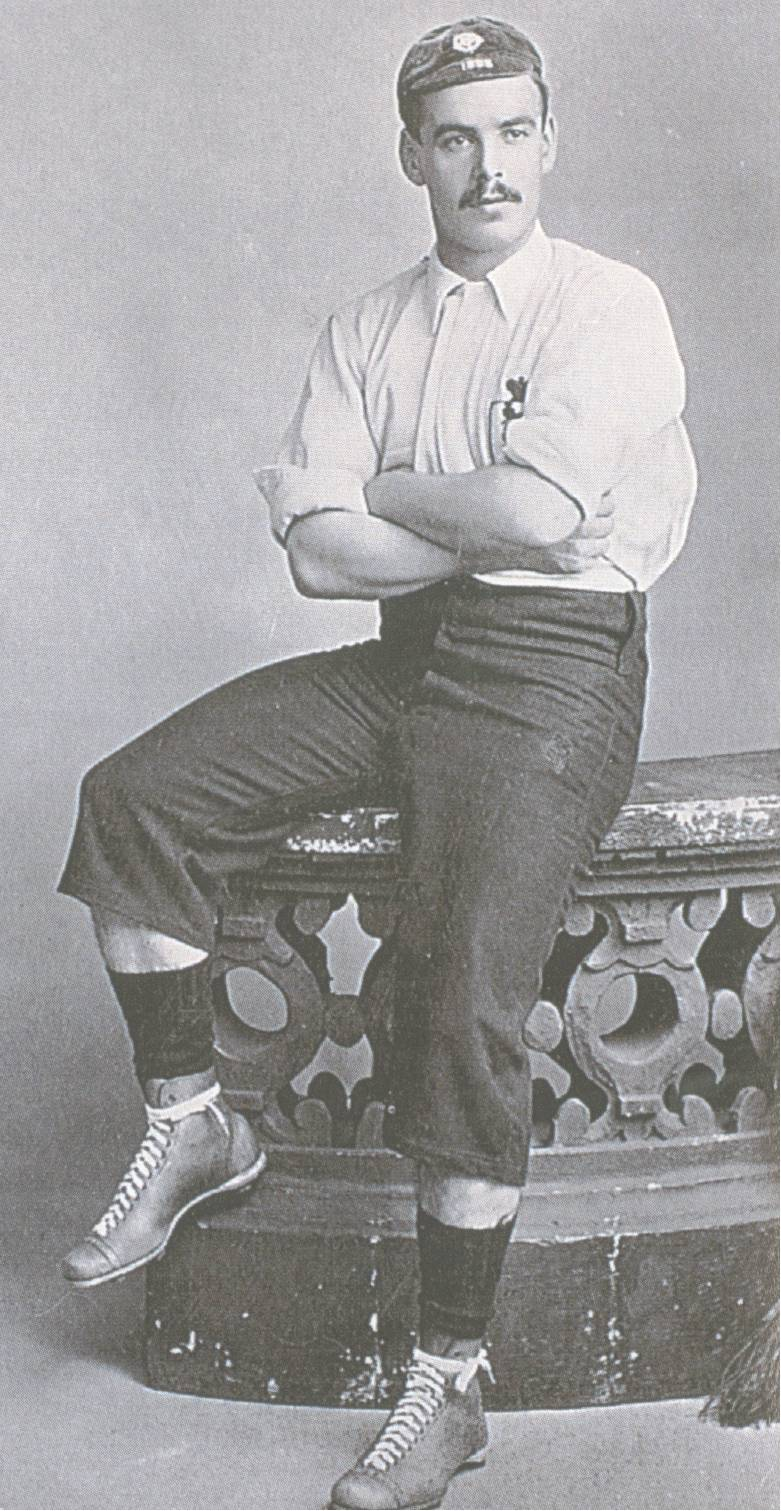
Stephen Smith managed New Brompton from 1906 to 1908.

New Brompton struggled in Division One, generally finishing close to the foot of the table, but did reach the first round proper of the FA Cup for the first time in 1899–1900, losing 1–0 to Southampton. In the same season the club was forced to play a league fixture at the home ground of Woolwich Arsenal when Priestfield was closed due to crowd trouble in a match against Millwall.

In the 1907–08 season, under the management of the former England international Stephen Smith, New Brompton finished bottom of the table, avoiding relegation only due to the expansion of the league, but did achieve a cup victory over First Division Sunderland, remembered for a hat-trick from Charlie McGibbon.

In 1912 the directors passed a resolution to change the club's name to Gillingham F.C., and the team played under this name throughout the 1912–13 season, although the change was not officially ratified by the shareholders until the following year. To coincide with the change, the team began sporting a new kit of red shirts with blue sleeves. The side again finished bottom of the division in the 1914–15 season, but avoided relegation for a second time when the league was suspended due to the escalation of the First World War.

Once the competition resumed after the war Gillingham, once again wearing black and white, continued to fare poorly, again finishing bottom of Division One in the 1919–20 season. For a third time, however, the club avoided relegation, due to the subsequent elevation of all Southern League Division One clubs to form the new Football League Third Division.

== Into the Football League: 1920–1938 ==
In the club's first match in the newly created Football League Division Three, Gillingham held Southampton to a 1–1 draw in front of a new record Priestfield crowd of 11,500, with Tom Gilbey scoring the club's first goal in league competition. Under new manager John McMillan the team struggled and finished the 1920–21 season bottom of the table, and in the years to follow there was little improvement, with the club regularly finishing in the lower reaches of the bottom division. Gillingham did not manage to finish in the top half of the table until 1925–26, when the team finished in 10th place, due mainly to the goals of Dick Edmed, who was promptly signed by Liverpool for a fee of £1,750, a new Gillingham record. Manager Harry Curtis departed soon afterwards to take over at Brentford, and former Wolverhampton Wanderers manager Albert Hoskins stepped down a division to manage the club, but he could do little to change the team's fortunes and left in 1929 after Gillingham finished bottom of the table once again.

Striker Fred Cheesmur set a new club record in the 1929–30 season when he scored six goals in a match against Merthyr Town. This remains the highest number of goals scored by a Gillingham player in a professional match, but was a rare high point in a season which saw Gillingham forced to apply for re-election to the league. The following year the club abandoned its traditional black and white striped shirts in favour of blue shirts and white shorts, colours which have remained associated with Gillingham ever since, although the black and white stripes are still visible in the current version of the club's badge. In 1932–33 former Crystal Palace manager Fred Maven led the club to its highest league finish to date, finishing the season in 7th place, but it was a feat which could not be repeated and the team returned to struggling at the foot of the table the following season.

Sim Raleigh died as a result of an injury sustained during a match in 1934.

In the 1934–35 season centre-forward Sim Raleigh, the club's top scorer the previous season and a player seen as a future star, suffered a brain haemorrhage following a blow to the head in a match against Brighton & Hove Albion on 1 December. Although he played on he collapsed during the second half and died in hospital later the same day. The club launched a fund which raised over £250 for his widow and child.

In 1938 the Gills finished bottom of the now-regionalised Third Division South once more, and were required to apply for re-election to the Football League for the fifth time since joining it in 1920. This time the club's bid for re-election failed, with Ipswich Town registering 36 votes to Gillingham's 28 and being promoted into the League. At the time it was considered a distinct possibility that Gillingham, saddled with heavy debts incurred during the preceding unsuccessful seasons, might not survive, but the club carried on, and returned to the Southern League the following season, albeit without manager Alan Ure, who was replaced by Bill Harvey.

== Wilderness years: 1938–1950 ==
The club's second stint in the Southern League was interrupted by the outbreak of the Second World War in 1939, which saw newly appointed manager Archie Clark and most of the players assigned to work at the local dockyards. When competitive football resumed, Gillingham played in the first incarnation of the Kent League, winning the title in both 1944–45 and 1945–46. In the second of these seasons the team also won the Kent Senior Cup, Kent County Challenge Cup and Kent League Cup, to complete a clean sweep of every senior trophy in the county. Following their Kent League triumphs, the Gills returned to the Southern League for the 1946–47 season, in which the team again won two trophies, claiming both the Southern League Cup and the Southern League title itself, and registered a club record 12–1 victory over Gloucester City. Striker Hughie Russell scored nine goals in the match, and missed out on double figures when he hit the bar late in the game.

Although Gillingham missed out on the Southern League title the following season, finishing as runners-up, the team again captured the Kent Senior Cup, as well as setting a club record attendance of 23,002 for a cup match against Queens Park Rangers. Gillingham applied for re-election to the Football League in the summer of 1948 but, despite producing a glossy brochure detailing the team's achievements, the club saw its application rejected, with only one vote cast in its favour. Despite this disappointment, the team continued to perform strongly in the Southern League and successfully regained the league title in 1948–49. In 1950 plans were announced to expand the Third Division South from 22 to 24 teams and, based on the team's local success in the interim, Gillingham gained re-election to the Football League, receiving the highest number of votes amongst the candidate clubs.

== Return to the Football League: 1950–1974 ==
Gillingham's first game back in the Football League saw the Kent club hold fellow new entrants Colchester United to a 0–0 draw at Priestfield in front of 19,542 fans. The 1950–51 season saw the Gills both concede and score nine goals in individual matches, and finished with them bottom of the table, a performance which was repeated the following season. In 1952 striker Jimmy Scarth set a Football League record when he scored a hat-trick in approximately 2 minutes 30 seconds against Leyton Orient, which was officially recognised as the fastest hat-trick in the history of the Football League until February 2004.

Gillingham's fortunes on the field gradually improved and the team finished in the top half of the Third Division South on three occasions, helped by the goals of Ernie Morgan, who in 1954–55 set a new club record by scoring 31 league goals. In 1956–57 and 1957–58, however, the Gills found themselves once again rooted to the bottom of the table, and this meant that with the restructuring of the league system for the 1958–59 season, the team was placed in the newly created Fourth Division – a top-half finish would have led to placement in the new national Third Division. 1958 also saw the departure of long-serving manager Archie Clark, who had held the post since before the Second World War, with Harry Barratt taking over.

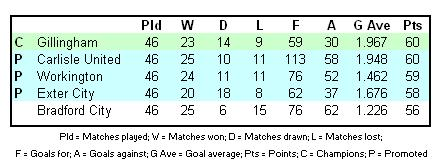
The top of the Division 4 table for the 1963–64 season, showing the tight finish between Gillingham and Carlisle

The Gills were still in the Fourth Division in 1962 when Barratt was replaced as manager by Freddie Cox, who inherited a team which had just finished 20th in the table. Cox set about fashioning a new team noted for its formidable defensive capabilities. After finishing in 5th place in 1962–63 Gillingham went on to gain promotion the following year, winning the first divisional championship in the club's history. With goalkeeper John Simpson setting a new club record by conceding only 30 goals all season, the team finished level on 60 points with Carlisle United, but with a fractionally better goal average, and so claimed the title.

Gillingham initially performed well at the higher level, twice coming close to promotion, but performances then declined and the club was relegated back to the Fourth Division in 1970–71. The Gills quickly bounced back, however, and were promoted back to the Third Division in 1973–74 under the management of Andy Nelson. With the help of players such as Brian Yeo, who equalled Ernie Morgan's record for most league goals in a season with 31, Gillingham scored a club record total of 90 league goals and finished as runners-up to Peterborough United.

== Consolidation, then collapse: 1974–1995 ==
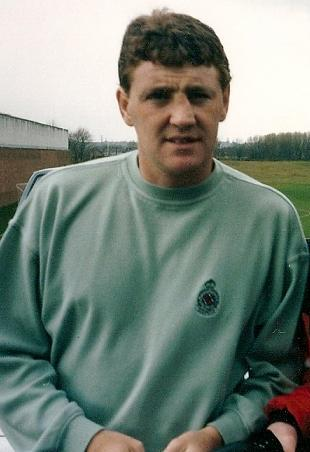
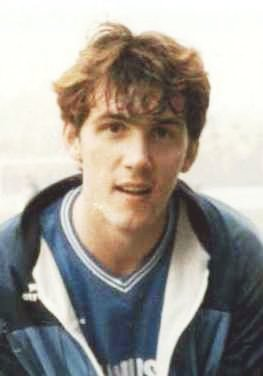
Steve Bruce and Tony Cascarino starred for Gillingham in the early 1980s.

After guiding the club to promotion Andy Nelson left to take over as manager of Charlton Athletic and was replaced by Len Ashurst, but his managerial reign lasted only 16 months. Gerry Summers took over and was to take the club the closest it had ever come to promotion to Division Two when, in 1978–79, Gillingham finished just one point off a promotion place, but two years later Summers was replaced by Keith Peacock. Peacock put together a team which developed a reputation for exciting, attacking play, and also brought through the ranks a number of young players who went on to achieve success at a higher level, including Micky Adams, Steve Bruce, and Tony Cascarino, who was famously bought from non-league Crockenhill in exchange for a set of tracksuits. Gillingham came close to promotion several times during Peacock's reign, with four top-six finishes in six years, and in 1986–87 reached the play-offs (in their first year of existence) only to lose in the final to Swindon Town. Deadlocked at 2–2 after the home and away legs of the final, the two teams had to play a third match at a neutral venue, which Swindon won 2–0.

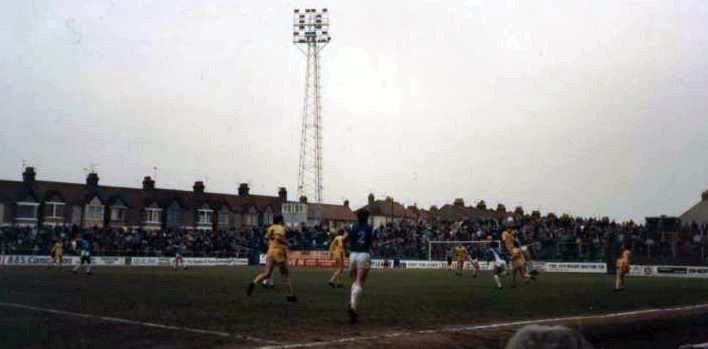
Gillingham (blue shirts) in action in a match from the 1985–86 season

The club's failure to gain promotion meant that it was unable to hang on to the ambitious Cascarino, who was sold to Millwall for £225,000, but despite the loss of the team's star striker the Gills' 1987–88 season began with a flurry of goals. On consecutive Saturdays Gillingham beat Southend United 8–1 and Chesterfield 10–0 (the latter a new club record for a professional match), but the early-season promise faded and in December Peacock was controversially sacked after a 6–0 defeat to Aldershot. His assistant, Paul Taylor, was promoted to manager, but after an unsuccessful spell in charge Taylor was himself replaced in October 1988 by former Tottenham Hotspur manager Keith Burkinshaw. Burkinshaw was unable to turn the team's fortunes around, however, and departed shortly before the club's relegation to Division Four was confirmed at the end of the 1988–89 season.

Former Gillingham player Damien Richardson became the club's next manager, with veteran goalkeeper Ron Hillyard as his assistant, but the club's financial situation was poor and the pair struggled to produce results with a squad composed of ageing journeymen and untried youngsters, and both men were sacked in September 1992, with Glenn Roeder taking over as manager. Gillingham's league status was in jeopardy for most of the 1992–93 Division Three campaign, with relegation to the Football Conference a distinct possibility until the last home match of the season, when a 2–0 win over Halifax Town ensured the club's league status. Nonetheless, the financial crisis continued at Priestfield, and steadily improving league form over the next two seasons did little to disguise the fact that the club was in real danger of going out of existence.

The club eventually went into receivership in January 1995, and by the end of the 1994–95 season, with Gillingham facing the threat of being expelled from the Football League and closed down, fans were wondering whether they had seen the last ever Gills match. However, help was on its way in the form of a last-ditch purchase of the club.

== Revival: 1995–2000 ==
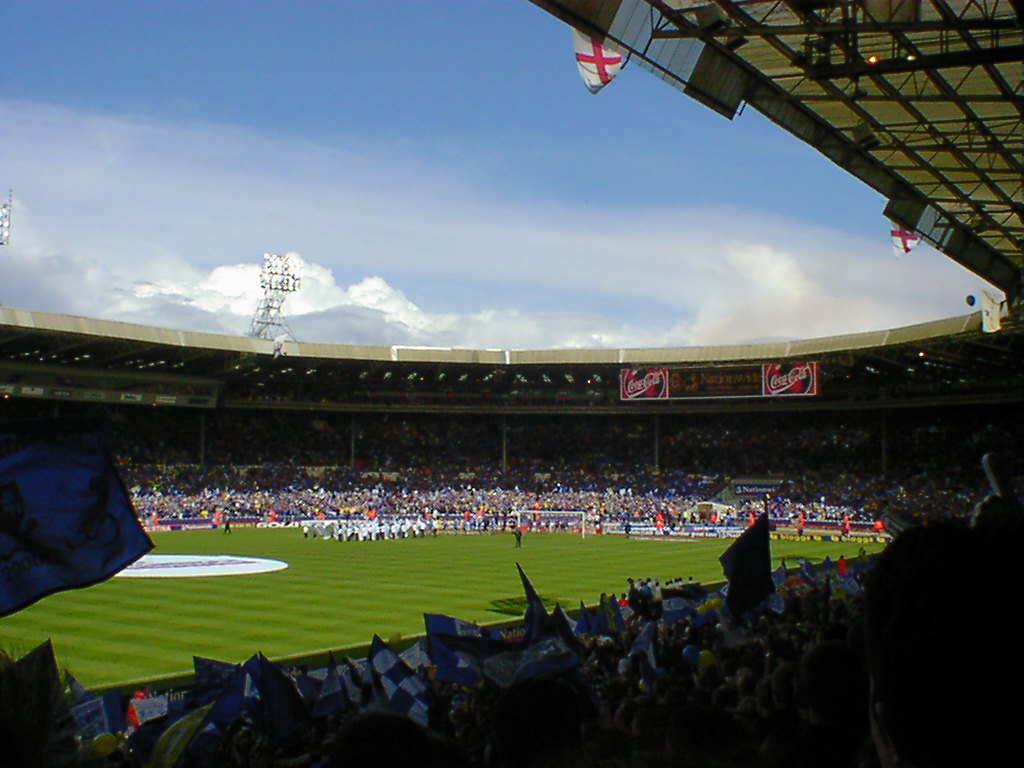
Gillingham fans at the 2000 Division Two play-off final

In June 1995 a London-based former office supplies salesman, Paul Scally, stepped in and bought the club for a nominal fee. Scally brought in new manager Tony Pulis, who signed almost a complete new team and led Gillingham to promotion in his first season, finishing second in Division Three (now Football League Two). This season was also notable for the fact that the team only conceded 20 league goals – a league record for a 46-game season. In 1999 Gillingham reached the playoffs, but lost in the Second Division play-off final against Manchester City. Following goals by the prolific partnership of Robert Taylor and Carl Asaba, the Gills led 2–0 with less than two minutes left, only to see Manchester City score twice, the equaliser in injury time, and then win a penalty shoot-out 3–1.

Soon after the play-off loss, Pulis was sacked for gross misconduct, with Peter Taylor replacing him as manager. In the 1999–00 season Gillingham went on a club record breaking FA Cup run, beating then-Premiership teams Bradford City and Sheffield Wednesday before losing 5–0 to Chelsea in the quarter-finals. The team also finished in third place in the league and thus qualified for the play-offs again, facing Wigan Athletic at Wembley Stadium in the final. The game finished 1–1 after 90 minutes but thanks to goals in extra time from Gillingham substitutes Steve Butler and Andy Thomson the club was promoted to the second tier of the English league (Division One) for the first time. As Taylor had only signed a one-year deal, Leicester City, then in the Premiership, approached him to be their new manager.

== Division One years: 2000–2005 ==
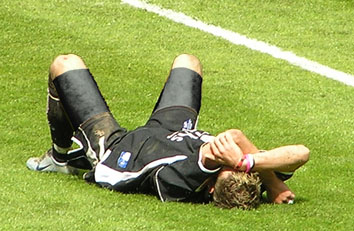
Nicky Southall slumps to the ground in despair after the Gills' relegation in 2005.

Former team captain Andy Hessenthaler was appointed player-manager, having previously served as player-coach, and led the club to league finishes of 13th, 12th and 11th in his first three seasons in charge. In contrast, the 2003–04 season saw the club escape relegation by the narrowest of margins, with a last day goalless draw keeping Gillingham above Walsall on goal difference, with just one goal separating the two teams. John Gorman was appointed to help Hessenthaler as the side started the 2004–05 season poorly, but as the team continued to struggle at the wrong end of the table Hessenthaler resigned as manager in late November. Somewhat unusually he continued to be employed as a player. Gorman succeeded Hessenthaler in a caretaker capacity but left the club to take the manager's job at Wycombe Wanderers. Gillingham then appointed former Burnley boss Stan Ternent as manager, but despite a late run of positive results, he could not prevent the Gills' relegation to League One on the last day of the season. In a reversal of the previous season's fortunes, Crewe Alexandra, the team immediately above Gillingham in the table, survived by just one goal.

== Return to the lower divisions: 2005–present ==
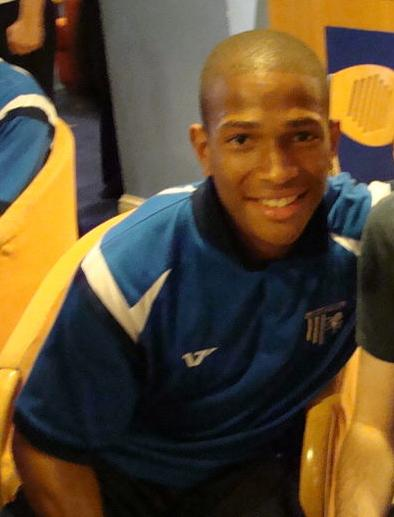
Simeon Jackson's goal won Gillingham promotion from the League Two play-offs in 2009.

The 2005–06 season started with Neale Cooper being appointed as the new manager, but despite achieving a 3–2 victory over Premiership side Portsmouth in the League Cup, the team struggled in the league, and shortly after defeat in the first round of the FA Cup by Northern Premier League side Burscough, Cooper resigned. He was replaced by Ronnie Jepson, who led the team to a mid-table finish, which he repeated in 2006–07. After a poor start to the 2007–08 season Jepson resigned, and Mick Docherty and Iffy Onuora were appointed joint caretaker managers. Docherty left the club a month later, but Onuora remained in charge until the appointment of Mark Stimson on 1 November 2007. At the end of the season the club was relegated from League One. The following season the Gills earned promotion through the play-offs after finishing fifth in the league, Simeon Jackson scoring the only goal in the final against Shrewsbury Town at Wembley Stadium. In the 2009–10 season, however, the Gills were relegated back to League Two, with Stimson leaving the club by mutual consent two days after the end of the season. Within two weeks, Andy Hessenthaler returned for a second spell as manager.

For two consecutive seasons the Gills finished just outside the play-off places in League Two, following which Hessenthaler was moved to the position of Director of Football and Martin Allen appointed as manager. In the 2012–13 season, helped by a new club record of eleven away wins in a season, the club once again gained promotion back to League One, winning the League Two championship, only the second title the club had ever won at a professional level. The following October, however, Allen was sacked after a poor start to the season and Peter Taylor was appointed manager for a second time. Taylor was sacked after fourteen months in the job, and his successor Justin Edinburgh lasted until January 2017. Former Gillingham player Adrian Pennock returned as manager, but the team came close to relegation at the end of the 2016–17 season. Pennock left the club by mutual consent in September 2017, and Steve Lovell, another former Gills player, took charge. Lovell left the club two games before the end of the 2018–19 season.

Steve Evans was announced as the team's new manager. In January 2022, following a 4–0 home defeat to Ipswich Town which left the side 22nd in the table, seven points from safety, Evans was dismissed. Neil Harris took over, but could not prevent the team being relegated to EFL League Two. In the 2022–23 season Gillingham reached the fourth round of the EFL Cup for only the third time in the club's history, defeating Premier League side Brentford on penalties in the third round, before succumbing to another top tier side in Wolverhampton Wanderers 2–0 in the following round. On 23 December 2022, Brad Galinson, an American property magnate was announced as a majority owner of Gillingham. A number of managers came and went in quick succession. Harris was dismissed in October 2023, following a 2-0 loss to Crewe Alexandra, and replaced by Stephen Clemence. Following the final match of the season he was sacked following a twelfth-place finish, six points off the play-off places, and replaced by Mark Bonner, but he was dismissed in January 2025, with John Coleman taking over. Coleman left the club in March 2025 and was replaced by Gareth Ainsworth. Ainsworth helped lead the Gills to the club's longest ever unbeaten run of 21 league games on 20 September 2025 against Newport County, a run that had started with the last three games of Coleman's tenure.
