= Steve Lovell (Welsh footballer) =

Welsh footballer & manager (born 1960)

Personal information
- Full name: Stephen John Lovell
- Date of birth: 16 July 1960 (age 66)
- Place of birth: Swansea, Wales
- Height: 5 ft 9 in (1.75 m)
- Position: Striker

Youth career
- 1977–1980: Crystal Palace

Senior career*
Years	Team	Apps	(Gls)
1980–1983	Crystal Palace	74	(3)
1979	→ Memphis Rogues (loan)	18	(0)
1979	→ Stockport County (loan)	12	(0)
1983–1987	Millwall	146	(43)
1987	→ Swansea City (loan)	2	(1)
1987–1992	Gillingham	233	(94)
1992	→ AFC Bournemouth (loan)	3	(0)
1992–1993	Sittingbourne		
1993–1994	Braintree Town		
1994	Barnet	1	(0)
1994	St Albans City		
1994–1995	Hastings Town		
1995–1996	Sittingbourne		
1996–1997	Gravesend & Northfleet		
1997	Weymouth		
1997–1999	Tonbridge Angels		
1999–2000	Deal Town		
2000–2001	Ashford Town (Kent)	16	(3)
2001	Sittingbourne		

International career
1981–1986	Wales	6	(1)

Managerial career
- 1995–1996: Sittingbourne
- 1996–1997: Gravesend & Northfleet
- 2003–2004: Hastings United
- 2005–2007: Sittingbourne
- 2007–2010: Ashford Town (Kent)
- 2014–2015: Gillingham (co-caretaker)
- 2016–2017: Bromley (assistant manager)
- 2017–2019: Gillingham
- 2021: Welling United
- 2022: Gillingham (caretaker)
- 2022–2023: Ramsgate
- 2023–2025: Herne Bay
- * Club domestic league appearances and goals

Stephen Lovell (born 16 July 1960) is a Welsh former professional footballer and manager. He was most recently the manager of Herne Bay.

He played professionally for Crystal Palace, Stockport County, Millwall, Swansea City, Gillingham and AFC Bournemouth and made over 450 Football League appearances. He was capped six times by Wales.

== Playing career ==
Born in Swansea, Wales, Lovell began his career as an apprentice with Crystal Palace in 1977, winning the FA Youth Cup with the South London side in 1977 and 1978, before making his league debut in a 2–0 defeat away to Wolverhampton Wanderers on 30 August 1980. Playing at the time as a right-back or a midfielder, he managed 74 Football League appearances in six years at Selhurst Park, during which he also had spells on loan at Stockport County and with Memphis Rogues of the North American Soccer League. In 1983, he moved to Millwall, making his debut in a 5–1 defeat loss away to Huddersfield Town on 12 February 1983. Millwall manager George Graham played Lovell as a striker during an injury crisis and he went on to score 13 goals in 11 matches and remained a striker for the remainder of his career.

In 1986 Lovell was injured whilst playing for Wales and was unable to regain a place in the Millwall team and, after a short loan spell with his hometown club Swansea City, was sold to Gillingham for £20,000. During his time with the Kent club he played over 200 matches and scored nearly 100 goals, finishing as the club's leading scorer in four consecutive seasons and equalling a club record by scoring in seven consecutive matches in 1990. Lovell featured in the club's 1987 Third Division play-off run in which the Gills defeated then Second Division side Sunderland over two legs before losing to Swindon Town over two legs and a replay in the final. This was the first season in which play-offs were used to determine promotion & relegation in English league football. He scored four goals in Gillingham's 8–1 defeat of Southend United in 1987 but failed to find the net at all when the team won 10–0 against Chesterfield the following Saturday.

After a brief loan spell with AFC Bournemouth in 1992, Lovell dropped into non-league football, where he played for nine different clubs in nine years, including three separate spells with Sittingbourne. In 2000, he played for Deal Town when they defeated Chippenham Town 1–0 in the last FA Vase final at the original Wembley stadium.

== International career ==
Lovell was first called up to the Wales national side ahead of a World Cup qualifier against the Soviet Union in November 1981, making his debut as a 86th minute substitute for Joey Jones in a 3–0 loss. Then Wales manager Mike England commented in February 1981 that he had attempted to call Lovell up previously but that it had been refused by Crystal Palace. Lovell scored his only goal for his country in a 4–2 away loss in a friendly to Norway in June 1985. His last appearance for Wales ended early through injury, with Lovell substituted just 8 minutes into a 3–0 friendly win in Vancouver against Canada in May 1986.

== Managerial career ==
Lovell's first managerial job came at Sittingbourne, where he was player-manager from February 1995 until September 1996, during which he led the team to the Southern League Southern Division championship. He then moved on to Gravesend & Northfleet where he was manager for a year.

After a spell as Football in the Community Officer for Gillingham (which overlapped the end of his playing career) Lovell returned to management with Hastings United in 2003 but left the club in 2004 after a drop in form. In 2005, he returned for a second spell managing Sittingbourne, a post he held until October 2007, when he left to take over at Ashford Town, where he remained until the club's demise in August 2010.

In December 2014 he was appointed co-caretaker manager of Gillingham alongside Andy Hessenthaler, Darren Hare and Mark Patterson following the sacking of Peter Taylor. The "Gang of Four", as they came to be known, remained in charge of the club until Justin Edinburgh was appointed as manager in February 2015. Lovell remained at the club in the role of first team coach. In May 2016 it was announced that he had left the club.

In June 2016, he was appointed as assistant manager of National League side Bromley, where he would work alongside former Gillingham teammate Neil Smith.

Lovell returned to Gillingham as a coach in January 2017 under Adrian Pennock. When Pennock was sacked in September 2017, Lovell continued as coach under the temporary managership of Peter Taylor, and became caretaker manager on 12 October when Taylor left the club. After four wins in his seven matches as caretaker, Lovell was confirmed in the position with a contract until the end of that season. Lovell was named the League One Manager of the Month award for January 2018, having led Gillingham to four league wins in four games in that period. His contract was further extended, to the end of the 2019–20 season, in April 2018.

In January 2019 Lovell led Gillingham to victory over Premier League side Cardiff City in the 3rd round of the FA Cup, earning a 4th round draw against his home town club Swansea City, who eventually knocked the Gills out of the tournament.

With two matches remaining in the season, and the team effectively safe from relegation in 13th place, Lovell was sacked from the role in April 2019, with a year of his contract remaining.

Lovell was appointed as Director of Football at National League side Ebbsfleet United in January 2020, but left the role after just 9 months.

On 13 January 2021, Lovell was appointed as manager of National League South side Welling United. Following the early curtailment of the season shortly after his appointment, Lovell continued with the club into the following season however on 20 September 2021, Lovell was announced to have resigned from his position.

In January 2022, he became caretaker manager again at Gillingham after the dismissal of Steve Evans. On 31 January 2022, following the appointment of Neil Harris, Lovell again departed the club. In April 2022 he was appointed as manager of Isthmian League South East Division Ramsgate. Lovell departed the club on 30 January 2023 with Ramsgate sitting in second place in the division.

In May 2023, he was appointed manager of recently relegated Isthmian League South East Division club Herne Bay on a two-year deal. In January 2025, Lovell was sacked from Herne Bay with the club sat in 17th place in the table, and 7 points above the relegation zone. Lovell confirmed in an interview that he was informed of his sacking via a late night phone call from chairman Matt Barman.

== Personal life ==
Lovell's father Alan was also a footballer, although he only managed a single professional appearance for Stockport County. Lovell's son Mark also became a footballer, turning professional with his father's old club Gillingham in 2001. He also made only one professional appearance before dropping into non-league football. His second son, Nick, is a youth coach at Gillingham.

== Managerial statistics ==
As of 18 October 2022

Team	From	To	Record				
Team	From	To	G	W	D	L	Win %
Ashford Town (Kent)	1 November 2007	31 May 2010	126	42	33	51	33.33
Gillingham (joint caretaker*)	31 December 2014	7 February 2015	8	3	2	3	37.50
Gillingham	12 October 2017	26 April 2019	92	32	26	34	34.78
Welling United	13 January 2021	21 September 2021	9	2	2	5	22.22
Ramsgate	4 April 2022	30 January 2023	13	8	2	3	61.54
Total			248	87	65	96	35.08

Lovell's first spell in management at Gillingham was as part of a team of four joint caretaker managers, along with Andy Hessenthaler, Darren Hare, and Mark Patterson.

== Honours ==
=== As a player ===
Crystal Palace

- FA Youth Cup: 1976–77, 1977–78

Deal Town

- FA Vase: 1999–2000

Individual

- Gillingham Player of the Season: 1987–88

=== As a manager ===
Sittingbourne

- Southern League Southern Division Champions: 1995–96

=== As an individual ===
- League One Manager of the Month: January 2018
