= Nyron Nosworthy =

Footballer (born 1980)

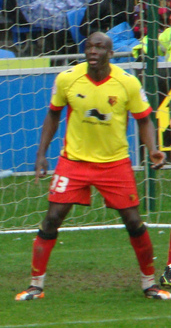
- Nosworthy playing for Watford in 2012

Personal information
- Full name: Nyron Paul Henry Nosworthy
- Date of birth: 11 October 1980 (age 46)
- Place of birth: Brixton, England
- Height: 5 ft 11 in (1.80 m)
- Position: Centre back

Youth career
- 1998–: Gillingham

Senior career*
Years	Team	Apps	(Gls)
1998–2005	Gillingham	174	(5)
2005–2012	Sunderland	114	(0)
2010	→ Sheffield United (loan)	19	(0)
2010–2011	→ Sheffield United (loan)	32	(0)
2011–2012	→ Watford (loan)	12	(0)
2012–2014	Watford	44	(2)
2014	→ Bristol City (loan)	10	(1)
2014–2015	Blackpool	5	(0)
2015	→ Portsmouth (loan)	7	(0)
2015–2016	Dagenham & Redbridge	17	(1)
Total		434	(9)

International career
2012–2014	Jamaica	14	(1)
- * Club domestic league appearances and goals

Nyron Paul Henry Nosworthy (born 11 October 1980) is a former professional footballer who played as a centre back. After beginning his career with Gillingham, he moved to Sunderland in 2005 with whom he played in the Premier League. After two lengthy loan spells with Sheffield United he made a permanent switch to Watford in 2012 but was released in the summer of 2014 after a loan to Bristol City. Nosworthy represented Jamaica at international level, playing fourteen games and scoring once.

== Early years ==
Nosworthy was born in Brixton, South London, to a Jamaican father and a Guyanese mother. He attended St Thomas the Apostle College in Nunhead. After leaving school at 16 Nosworthy worked as a cleaner in the City of London.

He grew up a fan of Arsenal, appreciating fellow South London-born Black British players such as Paul Davis and David Rocastle.

== Club career ==
=== Gillingham ===
Nosworthy began his career as a trainee at Gillingham from the age of 18. As a junior player Nosworthy played initially as a midfielder, but his first team debut, on 28 November 1999 against Fulham, came in attack. His first team debut was unusual in that he came on as a first-half substitute but was himself substituted later in the match. Following this Nosworthy made appearances in wide midfield and at left-back and centre-back before cementing his position as a right-back towards the end of the 2000–01 season. The following season, he appeared regularly, and was named as the club's Young Player of the Season.

His primary position was at the back though sometimes played up front and was occasionally used as an emergency striker with some success, scoring twice in a 2–1 win over Crystal Palace in the last game of the 2002–03 season, a result which helped Gillingham to its highest ever league finish of 11th in the second tier. Nosworthy was named as the Kent side's Player of the Season for 2002–03.

Nosworthy's contract expired at the end of the 2004–05 season, which saw Gillingham relegated to League One. Keen to play at a higher level, and aware of interest from other clubs, he chose not to accept a new deal with the club so left as a free agent.

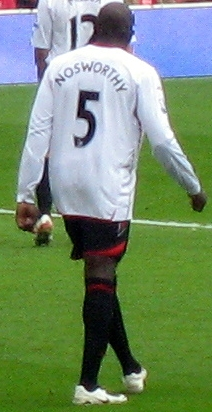
Nosworthy playing for Sunderland in 2007

=== Sunderland ===
Nosworthy signed for Sunderland on a free transfer on 13 June 2005. Expecting to start as backup to regular right back Stephen Wright, he was introduced to the FA Premier League rather sooner than anticipated when Wright sustained a serious knee injury after only one game. Nosworthy took full advantage of the opportunity, starting the majority of Sunderland's games.

In January 2007, new manager Roy Keane moved him to play at centre half instead of at full back. Nosworthy claimed that the additional concentration and organisation skills required to play in central defence improved his game. This improvement, which was also acknowledged by his then manager, combined with consistency of performance in his new role, led the club to extend his contract until June 2010. He was subsequently voted Sunderland's Player of the Season for 2006–07 despite facing stiff competition and mainly due to his improved performances that season. Sunderland fans famously used to chant " they tried to get the ball past Nyron but he said no no no" to the tune of Amy Winehouse's "Rehab", he also acted as the club's "Kick It Out" anti-racism campaign ambassador during this period.

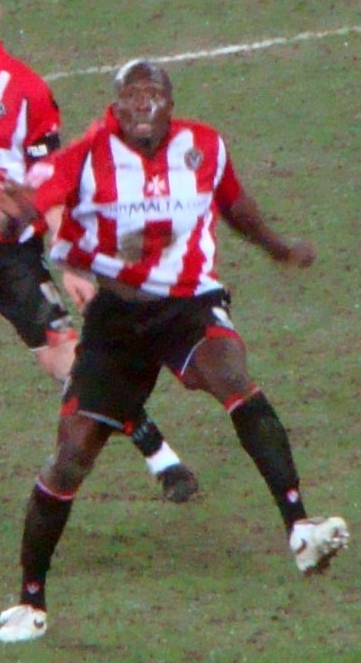
Nosworthy playing for Sheffield United.

Nosworthy remained with Sunderland, playing regularly through relegation and subsequent promotion back to the Premier League. With the arrival of new manager Steve Bruce he found his appearances became more limited and he was eventually allowed to leave on loan to Sheffield United in February 2010, agreeing a deal to remain with the Blades until the end of the season. He stayed the remainder of the season at Bramall Lane, playing 19 times at centre half and right back.

In July 2010 he was again loaned to Sheffield United on a season long loan deal without a recall clause. He was a regular starter in the Blades back four for most of the season but with the team in freefall, and all but relegated, he was released early from his loan deal and returned to Sunderland in mid-April 2011, having played a further thirty two times for the Yorkshire club.

=== Watford ===
After falling out of favour at Sunderland once again, it was confirmed on 28 October 2011 that he had joined Watford on loan until 8 January 2012. He made 12 league appearances including a 4–2 victory over Bradford City in the FA Cup third round, a day before his loan was due to end. Shortly after the end of his loan, Nosworthy signed permanently for Watford on 10 January 2012, on a two-and-a-half-year contract.

Nosworthy scored his first Watford goal in a 3–2 win against Burnley on 3 March 2012. It was his first goal in almost nine years. He also scored an own goal in the same game which gave Burnley a 2–0 lead in the 50th minute. Nosworthy played was an important part of Gianfranco Zola's squad during the 2012–13 season, making 19 league appearances before injuring his Achilles whilst on international duty with Jamaica in March 2013 – effectively ending his season.

Nosworthy returned from his injury to play five successive league games in late 2013. However, upon Zola's departure he found himself out of favour and later joined Bristol City on loan until the end of the season. Nosworthy was released by Watford in June 2014, after two and a half years at Vicarage Road.

On 14 March 2014, Nosworthy joined League One side Bristol City on an initial 30-day loan period. and made his Bristol City debut in a 0–0 draw at home to Swindon Town the following day. The loan was extended until the end of the 2013–14 season in April.

=== Blackpool ===
Nosworthy joined Lee Clark's Blackpool in November 2014, in a short-term deal until January 2015. He was among the 17 players released by Blackpool following their relegation to League One in 2015.

=== Portsmouth ===
On 19 March 2015, Nosworthy was loaned to Portsmouth until the end of the season.

=== Dagenham & Redbridge ===
In June 2015, Nosworthy signed for League Two side Dagenham & Redbridge on a one-year deal.

Nosworthy retired from football in February 2016 after losing his place in the team.

== International career ==
Nosworthy stated his ambitions to play international football for Jamaica, his father's country. He was also eligible to play for Guyana through his mother. On 4 October 2007, Nosworthy received his first call-up to the full Jamaica squad for their games against Ghana and Honduras. Nosworthy received another call up in May 2012 along with Watford teammate Adrian Mariappa. He made his international debut for Jamaica against Guyana on 19 May 2012. Nosworthy scored his first goal for Jamaica in a World Cup qualifier against Antigua and Barbuda, Jamaica won the game 4–1.

Nosworthy was called up to the 2014 Caribbean Cup squad and played in Jamaica's opening game against Martinique.

== Personal life ==
Nosworthy is a cousin of footballer Ethan Pinnock. He is a strong supporter of Arsenal.

== Career statistics ==
=== Club ===
Appearances and goals by club, season and competition
Club	Season	League			FA Cup		League Cup		Other		Total	
Club	Season	Division	Apps	Goals	Apps	Goals	Apps	Goals	Apps	Goals	Apps	Goals
Gillingham	1998–99	Second Division	3	0	0	0	0	0	1 (Note: Appearances in Football League Trophy)	0	4	0
Gillingham	1999–2000	Second Division	29	1	8	0	3	0	2 (Note: One appearance in League One play-offs, one in Football League Trophy)	0	42	1
Gillingham	2000–01	First Division	10	0	0	0	0	0	—		10	0
Gillingham	2001–02	First Division	29	0	2	0	0	0	—		31	0
Gillingham	2002–03	First Division	39	2	2	0	2	0	—		43	2
Gillingham	2003–04	First Division	27	2	2	0	3	1	—		32	3
Gillingham	2004–05	Championship	37	0	0	0	0	0	—		37	0
Gillingham	Total		174	5	14	0	8	1	3	0	199	6
Sunderland	2005–06	Premier League	30	0	0	0	2	0	—		32	0
Sunderland	2006–07	Championship	29	0	0	0	0	0	—		29	0
Sunderland	2007–08	Premier League	29	0	1	0	1	0	—		31	0
Sunderland	2008–09	Premier League	16	0	1	0	3	0	—		20	0
Sunderland	2009–10	Premier League	10	0	0	0	3	0	—		13	0
Sunderland	2010–11	Premier League	0	0	—		—		—		0	0
Sunderland	2011–12	Premier League	0	0	—		0	0	—		0	0
Sunderland	Total		114	0	2	0	9	0	—		125	0
Sheffield United (loan)	2009–10	Championship	19	0	—		—		—		19	0
Sheffield United (loan)	2010–11	Championship	32	0	0	0	0	0	—		32	0
Sheffield United (loan)	Total		51	0	0	0	0	0	—		51	0
Watford	2011–12	Championship	32	2	2	0	—		—		34	2
Watford	2012–13	Championship	19	0	1	0	1	0	0	0	21	0
Watford	2013–14	Championship	5	0	1	0	0	0	—		6	0
Watford	Total		56	2	4	0	1	0	0	0	61	2
Bristol City (loan)	2013–14	League One	10	1	—		—		—		10	1
Blackpool	2014–15	Championship	5	0	0	0	—		—		5	0
Portsmouth (loan)	2014–15	League Two	7	0	—		—		—		7	0
Dagenham & Redbridge	2015–16	League Two	17	1	5	0	1	0	1	0	24	1
Career total			434	9	25	0	19	1	4	0	482	10

=== International ===
As of match played 16 November 2014.

Appearances and goals by national team and year
National team	Year	Apps	Goals
Jamaica	2012	8	1
Jamaica	2013	2	0
Jamaica	2014	4	0
Total		14	1

Jamaica score listed first, score column indicates score after each Nosworthy goal.

International goals by date, venue, opponent, score, result and competition
No.	Date	Venue	Opponent	Score	Result	Competition
1	16 October 2012	Independence Park, Kingston, Jamaica	Antigua and Barbuda	2–0	4–1	2014 FIFA World Cup qualification

== Honours ==
Gillingham

- Football League Second Division play-offs: 2000

Sunderland

- Football League Championship: 2006–07

Individual

- Gillingham Young Player of the Season: 2001–02
- Gillingham Player of the Season: 2002–03
- North-East Football Writers' Player of the Year: 2006–07
- Sunderland Player of the Season: 2006–07
