= Darren Hare =

English footballer (born 1967)

Personal information
- Date of birth: 2 April 1967 (age 59)
- Place of birth: Canterbury, England
- Position: Striker

Team information
- Current team: Ashford United (interim assistant manager)

Youth career
- 1982–1983: Dover
- 1982–1983: Gillingham

Senior career*
Years	Team	Apps	(Gls)
1983–1984	Dover Athletic		
1984	Gravesend & Northfleet		
1984–1986	Dover Athletic		
1986	Ashford Town	5	(3)
1986	Thanet United	3	(0)
1986–1988	Ashford Town	60	(30)
1988	Canterbury City	8	(3)
1988–1989	Dover Athletic		
1989–?	Hastings Town		
c.1994	Canterbury City		
1996–?	Folkestone Invicta		
1997–1998	Canterbury City		
2005	Herne Bay		
2005	Sittingbourne		
2005–?	Herne Bay		

Managerial career
- Canterbury City
- 1996: Folkestone Invicta
- 2004: Gillingham (caretaker)
- 2014: Gillingham (co-caretaker)
- 2016–2017: Hastings United
- * Club domestic league appearances and goals

Darren Hare (born 2 April 1967) is an English football coach and former player, who is interim assistant manager of Ashford United.

== Career ==
Born in Canterbury, he began his career playing for the youth teams of Dover and Gillingham and went on to play for a number of Kent-based non-league teams, including Ashford Town (where he was club leading scorer for two seasons), Thanet United, Canterbury City, Herne Bay and Sittingbourne. He also managed Canterbury and Folkestone Invicta, and worked as Youth Development Officer for the Kent County Football Association.

Hare later became Head of Youth Development for Gillingham. In December 2004 he served as acting manager after the resignation of both Andy Hessenthaler and caretaker manager John Gorman. The following year he left Priestfield Stadium to become Head of Education and Welfare in the academy system at Crystal Palace, and made a brief playing comeback at the age of 38.

In 2007, he joined Dover Athletic as assistant to Hessenthaler, the club's new manager, who is also his brother-in-law. When Hessenthaler began his second period as manager at Gillingham in May 2010, Hare also returned to Priestfield, as youth team manager.

Hare was appointed as manager of Hastings United of the Isthmian League South Division in May 2016. He led the side to the play-offs during his one season in charge, but Hasings were defeated by Dorking Wanderers in the semi-finals on penalties following a 1–1 draw. He resigned from the role in May 2017, citing a desire to concentrate on his family and business interests.

In October 2018 he rejoined Dover and Andy Hessenthaler, taking on the position of joint first team coach. In November 2020, Hare resigned from his position for personal reasons.

On 29 November 2022, Hare was appointed first team coach of Isthmian League South East Division club Faversham Town to new manager Sammy Moore. In March 2024, he joined Ashford United as interim assistant manager until the end of the season. Having departed the club at the end of the 2023–24 season, he returned to the club as assistant manager in January 2025.

== Personal life ==
Hare is married to Alison, a nurse, and has three children, Josh, Chloe and James. Josh is a footballer who as of 2026 plays semi-professionally for Faversham Town. He is also the uncle of footballer Jake Hessenthaler.
