= Nicky Southall =

English footballer

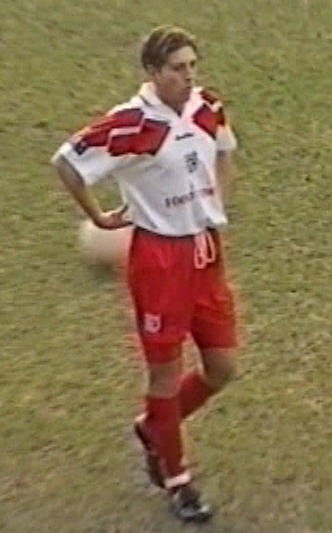
- Southall playing for Grimsby Town in 1994

Personal information
- Full name: Leslie Nicholas Southall
- Date of birth: 28 January 1972 (age 54)
- Place of birth: Middlesbrough, England
- Position: Midfielder

Youth career
- Darlington

Senior career*
| Years | Team | Apps | (Gls) |
| 1991–1995 | Hartlepool United | 138 | (24) |
| 1995–1997 | Grimsby Town | 72 | (6) |
| 1997–2001 | Gillingham | 154 | (17) |
| 2001–2002 | Bolton Wanderers | 18 | (1) |
| 2002 | → Norwich City (loan) | 9 | (0) |
| 2002–2005 | Gillingham | 92 | (2) |
| 2005–2007 | Nottingham Forest | 67 | (13) |
| 2007–2009 | Gillingham | 83 | (4) |
| 2008 | → Dover Athletic (loan) | 4 | (0) |
| 2009–2010 | Dover Athletic | 27 | (4) |
| 2010–2012 | Gillingham | 0 | (0) |
| 2012–2014 | Whitstable Town | 20 | (5) |
| Total | | 684 | (76) |

Managerial career
- 2012–2014: Whitstable Town (player/manager)
- 2023–2024: Lordswood
- 2024: Lydd Town
- * Club domestic league appearances and goals

Leslie Nicholas Southall (born 28 January 1972) is an English former professional footballer and manager.

During his time in professional football Southall was a midfielder from 1991 to 2014 who competed in the top four tiers of English league football, notably in the Premier League for Bolton Wanderers. He has represented Hartlepool United, Grimsby Town, Gillingham, Norwich City and Nottingham Forest in the Football League as well as Dover Athletic and Whitstable Town in non-League football.

== Childhood and early career ==
A former pupil of Coulby Newham Secondary School, he has used his second given name since childhood. He started his career as a left-winger, but has played in most positions, including goalkeeper.

Southall was spotted playing Sunday football for Nunthorpe Boys and was offered a trial at Newcastle United. After realising he'd have little chance of breaking into the Newcastle team he left and joined Darlington on schoolboy terms.

== Playing career ==
=== Hartlepool United ===
Darlington let him go but he resumed his career with Hartlepool United where he was a regular in the first team for four seasons. Every one of his 130 appearances for Hartlepool was as a member of the starting line-up, and he scored 28 goals.

=== Grimsby Town ===
He was transferred to Grimsby Town for £40,000 and played 55 times, scoring nine goals. On his home debut he had to play in goal after the Grimsby keeper was sent off – allegedly, the other players forced him in because he had the same surname as legendary Everton keeper Neville Southall.

Grimsby manager Brian Laws signed the Italian Ivano Bonetti as Southall's replacement just months after Southall himself had arrived at Blundell Park, forcing Southall out of the first-team altogether for much of the mid-season. He often failed to even make the bench and at one point was even asked to do co-commentary for the local media stations.

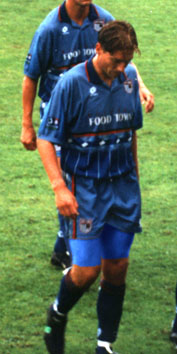
Southall became a target of the boo-boys at Grimsby after his own-goal against Stoke condemned Grimsby to relegation.

After Bonetti had a disagreement with Laws, Southall was given a chance to re-establish himself in the first-team. After scoring an own-goal against Stoke City during Grimsby's relegation run-in the 96/97 season, Southall was frozen out of the first team in the 1997–98 season.

=== Gillingham ===
He then moved on a free transfer to Gillingham, where he became a popular figure. He made almost 200 appearances for the Gills and scored 29 goals, including a goal nominated for Goal of the Month against then Premiership side Sheffield Wednesday to knock them out of the FA Cup.

=== Bolton Wanderers ===
After this spell at Gillingham he moved to the Premiership with Bolton Wanderers. He thereby became one of the few footballers to play in all four divisions of the Football League system. He made just over 20 appearances for them and scored once, against Newcastle United. He went on loan to Norwich City for a brief spell as he looked to secure a permanent move away from the Premiership.

=== Gillingham (second spell) ===
He caused a stir at Gillingham by making a welcome return there on a free transfer. He made a further 90 appearances but failed to recapture the form which had previously made him a cult hero there.

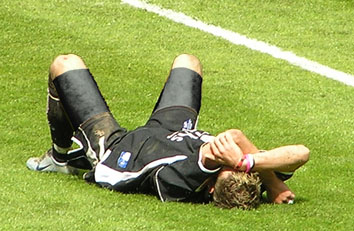
Southall slumps to the ground after Gillingham are relegated by Nottingham Forest

Gillingham were relegated to League One at the end of the 2004–05 season after being held to a draw by Nottingham Forest. He was out-of-contract and Gillingham did not retain his services.

=== Nottingham Forest ===
Nottingham Forest offered the 33-year-old a two-year contract shortly after. In the 2005–06 season, he came second in the club Player of the Season vote, behind Ian Breckin, with 18% of the votes. He finished the season with eight goals as Forest narrowly missed out on a play-off place.

=== Gillingham (third spell) ===
At the end of the 2006–07 season he was due to be out of contract. Forest fans were keen to see his contract renewed, however, on 31 January 2007 it was announced that he had rejoined Gillingham for a third spell on a two-and-a-half-year deal.

Southall made his third debut for Gillingham in the 3–1 away defeat to Huddersfield Town on 3 February. He joined Dover Athletic on a one-month loan deal on 9 September 2008. Southall made an immediate impact on his Dover debut, setting up Shaun Welford for the opening goal of the game against Hendon. He regained a place in the Gillingham team later that season, and made his final appearance as a substitute in the playoff semi-final second leg against Rochdale on 10 May 2009.

=== Dover Athletic ===
Southall rejoined Dover Athletic during the 2009 pre-season on trial, playing in a handful of friendlies before signing on a permanent deal. In August 2009, Southall scored his first goal for Dover with a well struck free kick to give his side the lead in an encounter against Dorchester Town. He became player/assistant manager when Ian Hendon was appointed manager of the club in May 2010; however, within a month Hendon had been appointed as assistant manager at Gillingham by his predecessor at Dover, Andy Hessenthaler.

=== Gillingham (fourth spell) ===
Southall signed for the Gills for a fourth time, as player-coach. His fourth Gillingham debut came in a defeat to his previous club, Dover, in a first round FA Cup match on 6 December 2010. When he departed Gillingham in May 2012, his appearance in the FA Cup represented his only appearance in his two years with the Gills.

== Coaching career ==
On 26 June 2012, Southall joined Whitstable Town as a player-coach. He then took over as player manager, but left at the end of the 2013–14 season, moving to Maidstone United as assistant manager. He remained with Maidstone until October 2018 when he joined Dover Athletic as first team coach. Southall left the club in June 2022.

In December 2023, Southall was appointed manager of SCEFL Premier Division club Lordswood. He departed the club by mutual consent in November 2024.

On 18 November 2024, Southall was appointed manager of SCEFL Premier Division side Lydd Town. Just one month later however, on 27 December, he was sacked after three defeats from three league matches which saw the side sitting bottom of the league, seven points from safety, as well as an 8-0 defeat in the league cup to lower division Rochester United.

== Honours ==
Gillingham

- Football League Second Division play-offs: 2000
