= Carl Asaba =

English footballer

Personal information
- Full name: Carl Edward Asaba
- Date of birth: 28 January 1973 (age 53)
- Place of birth: Westminster, London, England
- Height: 1.88 m (6 ft 2 in)
- Position: Forward

Senior career*
Years	Team	Apps	(Gls)
1993–1994	Dulwich Hamlet		
1994–1997	Brentford	54	(25)
1995	→ Colchester United (loan)	12	(2)
1997–1998	Reading	33	(8)
1998–2001	Gillingham	77	(36)
2001–2003	Sheffield United	67	(23)
2003–2005	Stoke City	70	(9)
2005–2006	Millwall	21	(3)
Total		334	(106)
- * Club domestic league appearances and goals

Carl Edward Asaba (born 28 January 1973) is an English former footballer who played as a forward in the Football League. He began his career with non-league Dulwich Hamlet, his goalscoring prowess earning him a move to Brentford in 1994. He played for Colchester United on loan, before moving to Reading in 1997. He had successful stints with Gillingham, where he scored 36 goals in 77 league appearances, and Sheffield United, scoring 23 times in 67 league games. He also played for Stoke City and ended his career with Millwall. Returned to involvement in the world of professional football in 2021 via co-commentary for BBC Radio Sheffield and expert analysis for Sheffield United TV live. Appointed ambassador for the Sheffield children's hospital charity in 2020 and has organised charity events via Sarbs Charity Events with events giving people a chance to 'beat-a-Blade' (himself and former players) in sporting activities with all proceeds going directly to the Children's Hospital Charity.

== Career ==
Born in Westminster, London, Asaba started his career with Dulwich Hamlet. He earned a moved to Brentford in 1994 having scored a number of goals at non-league level. He made little impact in his debut season, however in his first full season his form improved considerably, developing pace and strength on the ball. Asaba made 12 league appearances and scored two goals for Colchester United on loan in 1995. He made his professional debut at Colchester, where he scored on his debut against Barnet. He returned to Brentford, scoring 23 goals in the 1996–97 season as the Bees lost out in the play-offs. Asaba's goalscoring exploits then saw him earn an £800,000 move to Reading in 1997.

After failing to make an impact at Reading, scoring just eight goals in 32 league appearances, Asaba was signed to Gillingham for a club record fee of £590,000. He soon formed a formidable partnership with Robert Taylor and finished the 1998–99 season as the club's top scorer, scoring 23 goals in all competitions. He scored in the season's play-off final against Manchester City, opening the scoring 1–0 to Gillingham in the 81st minute. Strike partner Taylor scored the second in the 86th minute, but a last minute comeback from City took the tie to extra time and then on to penalties, which City won 3–1. In a spell that was dogged by injury, Asaba scored 40 goals in 91 appearances in all competitions.

Asaba joined Sheffield United for a fee of £92,500 on 9 March 2001. He became a fan favourite after scoring the winner in a 2–1 win over bitter rivals Sheffield Wednesday in the Steel City derby on 1 April 2001. On 16 December 2002, Sheffield United reported Reading player John Mackie to The Football Association and Professional Footballers Association after racially abusing Asaba during a 2–0 win for United on 14 December 2002, prompting an apology from Mackie and two weeks' of his wages donated to the Kick Racism Out of Football campaign. Mackie was later handed a three-match ban and a £1,500 fine, with a five-match ban and another £1,500 suspended until the end of the following season.

On 6 August 2003, Asaba signed for Stoke City on a free transfer, and made his debut three days later in a 3–0 win over Derby County. His time with Stoke was largely unsuccessful, scoring only nine league goals in 70 appearances. With 12 months remaining on his Stoke contract, Asaba handed-in a transfer request in May 2005.

Millwall moved to sign Asaba on 25 August 2005 on a free transfer. He played in 24 games and scored four goals for Millwall before being one of eight players released from the club at the end of the 2005–06 season.

After leaving Millwall, Asaba began training with Leicester City on non-contract terms in October 2006. However, he failed to agree a permanent deal with the club, and also failed to agree to terms with Nottingham Forest and Yeovil Town. In November 2006, he was given a trial at Chesterfield, where he also failed to sign permanently.

== Personal life ==
After retiring from football, Asaba settled in Sheffield and entered the motor trade. During the 2021–22 season, he worked as a co-commentator for BBC Radio Sheffield and Sheffield United's in-house television channel.

== Career statistics ==
Appearances and goals by club, season and competition
Club	Season	League			FA Cup		League Cup		Other^{[A]}		Total	
Club	Season	Division	Apps	Goals	Apps	Goals	Apps	Goals	Apps	Goals	Apps	Goals
Brentford	1994–95	Second Division	0	0	0	0	0	0	1	1	1	1
Brentford	1995–96	Second Division	10	2	1	0	1	0	1	0	13	2
Brentford	1996–97	Second Division	44	23	3	0	4	0	5	1	56	24
Brentford	Total		54	25	4	0	5	0	7	2	70	27
Colchester United (loan)	1994–95	Third Division	12	2	0	0	0	0	0	0	12	2
Reading	1997–98	First Division	32	8	3	1	7	3	0	0	42	12
Reading	1998–99	Second Division	1	0	0	0	2	1	―		2	1
Reading	Total		33	8	3	1	9	4	0	0	45	13
Gillingham	1998–99	Second Division	41	20	1	0	0	0	7	2	49	22
Gillingham	1999–2000	Second Division	11	6	1	0	0	0	2	0	14	6
Gillingham	2000–01	First Division	25	10	0	0	3	2	0	0	28	12
Gillingham	Total		77	36	2	0	3	2	9	2	91	40
Sheffield United	2000–01	First Division	10	5	0	0	0	0	―		10	5
Sheffield United	2001–02	First Division	29	7	2	0	2	0	―		33	7
Sheffield United	2002–03	First Division	28	11	1	0	5	1	3	0	37	12
Sheffield United	Total		67	23	3	0	7	1	3	0	80	24
Stoke City	2003–04	First Division	37	8	2	0	1	0	―		40	8
Stoke City	2004–05	Championship	33	1	1	0	1	1	―		35	2
Stoke City	Total		70	9	3	0	2	1	0	0	75	10
Millwall	2005–06	Championship	21	3	0	0	3	1	―		24	4
Career total			334	106	15	1	29	9	19	4	397	120

A. The "Other" column constitutes appearances and goals (including those as a substitute) in the Football League play-offs and Football League Trophy.

== Honours ==
Gillingham

- Football League Second Division play-offs: 2000

Individual

- PFA Team of the Year: 1996–97 Second Division
