= Andy Hessenthaler =

Footballer and manager (born 1965)

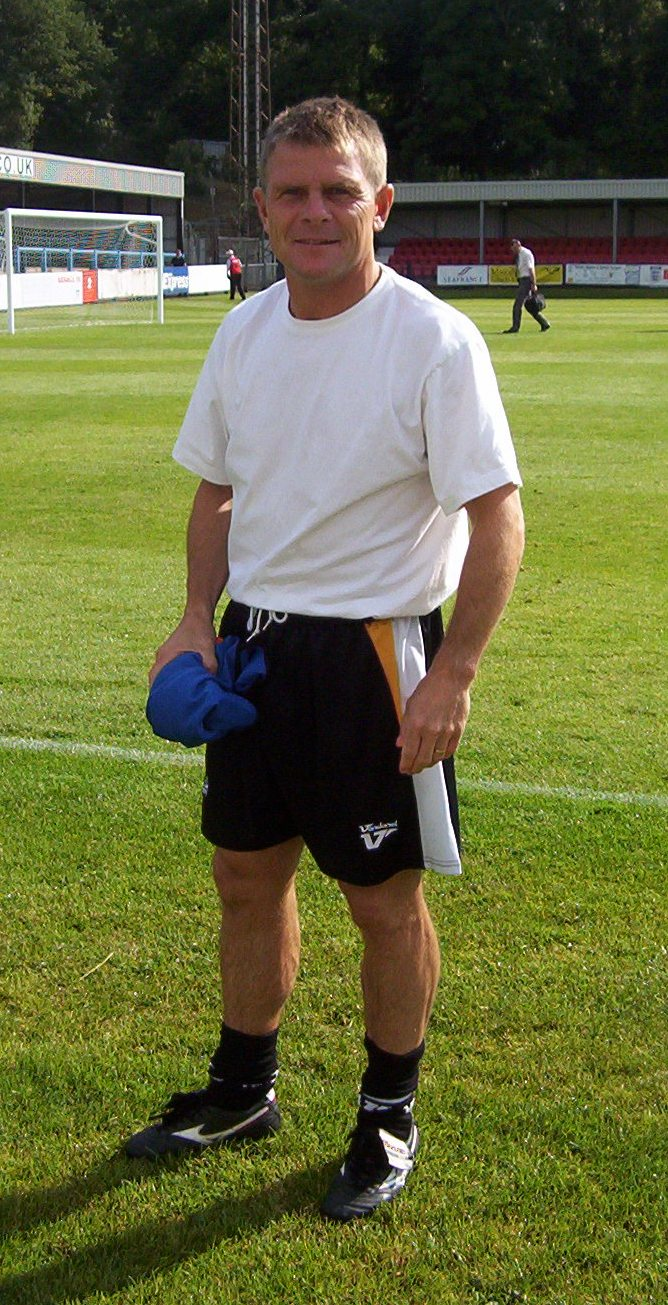
- Hessenthaler with Dover Athletic in July 2009

Personal information
- Full name: Andrew Hessenthaler
- Date of birth: 17 August 1965 (age 61)
- Place of birth: Dartford, England
- Position: Midfielder

Team information
- Current team: Gillingham (head of recruitment)

Youth career
- Dartford

Senior career*
Years	Team	Apps	(Gls)
?–1983	Corinthian		
1983–1984	Charlton Athletic	0	(0)
1984–1986	Corinthian		
1986–1990	Dartford		
1990–1991	Redbridge Forest		
1991–1996	Watford	195	(11)
1996–2006	Gillingham	303	(20)
2005	→ Hull City (loan)	10	(0)
2006–2007	Barnet	40	(2)
2007–2010	Dover Athletic	36	(4)
Total		584	(37)

International career
1990	England National Game XI	1	(0)

Managerial career
- 2000–2004: Gillingham (player/manager)
- 2007–2010: Dover Athletic (player/manager)
- 2010–2012: Gillingham
- 2014–2015: Gillingham (co-caretaker)
- 2016: Leyton Orient
- 2017–2018: Eastleigh
- 2018–2023: Dover Athletic
- * Club domestic league appearances and goals

Andrew Hessenthaler (born 17 August 1965) is an English football manager and former player who is head of recruitment at EFL League Two club Gillingham. He began his career in non-league football and did not turn professional until he joined Watford at the age of 26. In 1996, Hessenthaler joined Gillingham and spent the next ten years at the club as player and later player-manager, managing the club to its highest ever finish in the English football league system and becoming regarded as a legend of the Kent club. After leaving Gillingham, he had a short spell at Barnet, before joining Dover Athletic in 2007. In his two seasons in charge he led the club to successive championships, of Isthmian League Division One South and the Isthmian League Premier Division. After three years at Dover, he became manager at Gillingham for the second time, but his contract was terminated at the end of the 2011–12 season. He returned to the club as assistant manager in 2014, before taking on a similar role at Leyton Orient the following year. In 2016, he was appointed manager of the club, but was sacked later the same year. In November he was appointed manager of Eastleigh, but the following year left to return to Dover, where he stayed until January 2023.

== Career ==
=== Non-League career ===
As a teenager, Hessenthaler played for the youth team of his local club Dartford. He later joined Fawkham-based amateur team Corinthian, but Charlton Athletic took him on in 1983 on a non-contract trial basis. He failed to secure a contract with the club, however, and returned to playing on a part-time basis while working as a builder. In 1986, he was spotted by Dartford manager Peter Taylor while playing in a Kent Senior Cup match. Hessenthaler signed for his hometown club on a wage of £40 per week, the first regular income he had ever received for playing.

Hessenthaler spent four years at the club, during which time Dartford reached the semi-finals of the FA Trophy on two occasions and finished twice as runners-up in the Southern League. In 1990, he was called up to the England National Game XI, the national team for semi-professional players. Later that year, he moved on to Redbridge Forest, where he spent one season and helped the team win the Isthmian League championship.

=== Watford ===
On the recommendation of Peter Taylor, who was by now assistant manager of Watford, Hessenthaler was signed by the Hertfordshire club for a transfer fee of £65,000 at the beginning of the 1991–92 season. He opted to make the move even though becoming a full-time professional player would mean taking a drop in earnings compared to what he was making combining semi-professional football with building work. His professional debut was against Blackburn Rovers at Ewood Park on 17 September 1991, and, despite having made a move of four divisions up the English football league system, he immediately established himself as a regular at Vicarage Road, making 35 Football League appearances in his first season. In five seasons with the Hornets, he made 217 appearances in total, scoring 14 goals, and also served as the team's captain. Watford fans voted Hessenthaler as runner-up for the club's Player of the Season award in four consecutive seasons between 1992 and 1995, and fondly remember him for his workrate and all-round ability. He was one of the club veterans selected to represent Watford in the 2006 London Masters football event, where he was named "Player of the Tournament".

=== Gillingham ===
At the end of the 1995–96 season, shortly after Watford's relegation from the First Division, Hessenthaler signed for Gillingham for £235,000, a record fee at the time for the club. He quickly became a key player at Priestfield Stadium. In the 1998–99 season, he returned to his best form, and he played in the Gills' first ever match at Wembley Stadium. This match was the final of the play-offs against Manchester City, which Gillingham lost after a penalty shoot-out. Shortly afterwards, Gillingham manager Tony Pulis, who had signed Hessenthaler, was dismissed from his post. He was replaced by Peter Taylor, who appointed Hessenthaler as player-coach. In his first season in this new role, he was once again a regular in the Gillingham team, making a total of 47 appearances as the club recorded its highest position to date in the English football league system and best ever run in the FA Cup. Although the cup run came to an end with a 5–0 defeat at the hands of Chelsea of the Premier League, Hessenthaler's high-energy performance prompted Chelsea chairman Ken Bates to joke that he had been keen to sign the player until he discovered to his surprise that he was 35 years old (although Hessenthaler was in fact only 34 at the time). Gillingham once again qualified for the play-off final, with Hessenthaler making his second appearance at Wembley as the Gills beat Wigan Athletic 3–2 after extra time to secure promotion to the Football League First Division for the first time in the club's history.

Immediately after guiding Gillingham to promotion, Peter Taylor left to manage Leicester City, and Hessenthaler was appointed player-manager. In his first season in charge, he guided the club to a thirteenth-place finish while continuing to play regularly. A serious leg injury sustained in an FA Cup match against AFC Bournemouth in January 2001 kept him out for the remainder of the season but did not prevent him being selected for the Football League's Team of the Season. Despite many of the club's rivals having greater budgets available with which to sign and pay players, the team finished the 2001–02 season in twelfth place and the following season in eleventh place in the First Division, Gillingham's best ever finish in over seventy seasons in the Football League. During the 2003–04 season, however, the Gills' fortunes declined, and the team only avoided relegation on goal difference after holding Stoke City to a draw in the last match of the season. As the team continued to struggle at the start of the following season, club owner Paul Scally reiterated his confidence in Hessenthaler but brought in former Swindon Town and Wycombe Wanderers manager John Gorman to assist him. The following month, with no significant improvement in the team's fortunes, Hessenthaler tendered his resignation.

He remained at the club as a player but was rarely selected for the team, and in January 2005, he went on loan to Hull City, where he was reunited once again with Peter Taylor. He made ten appearances for Hull, who gained promotion to the Football League Championship (the new name for what had previously been called the First Division), while Gillingham were relegated from the same division. He returned to the Gillingham team at the start of the 2005–06 season and made a further 17 appearances, the final one in a 3–0 home win against Port Vale on 10 December 2005. At forty years and four months of age, he set a new record as the oldest player ever to represent the club. He rounded out his Gillingham career by returning to Priestfield Stadium for a testimonial match in July 2006. He is widely regarded as a club legend by Gillingham fans, who in 2005 voted him the team's best ever player in a local radio poll, and he was also named Gillingham's greatest ever player by the Professional Footballers' Association in November 2007.

=== Barnet ===
On 19 January 2006, Hessenthaler signed for League Two strugglers Barnet on a short-term contract until the end of the season. Although he considered retiring at the end of the season, he was persuaded by manager Paul Fairclough to sign a new contract for a further year. In October 2006, he was named in the League Two team of the week, but at the end of the 2006–07 season, Barnet announced that his contract would not be renewed.

== Managerial career ==
Shortly after his departure from Barnet, Hessenthaler was appointed manager of Dover Athletic of the Isthmian League First Division South. In his first season in charge, he played regularly, making over 30 appearances as he led the team to the championship of the division and promotion to the Isthmian League Premier Division. The following season, he led the team to a second consecutive championship as Dover won the Isthmian League Premier Division title to gain promotion to Conference South. In the 2009–10 season, Dover reached the play-offs for promotion to the Conference National, but lost at the semi-final stage to Woking. Hessenthaler, at the age of 44, announced his retirement as a player after the match.

On 20 May 2010, Hessenthaler resigned as Dover manager, and the following day, he became the manager of Gillingham, who had just been relegated to Football League Two, for the second time. His contract was terminated at the end of the 2011–12 season after the Gills narrowly missed out on the play-offs for promotion to League One, although he was offered a seat on the board of directors and a "football development role". He left the position of director of football at Gillingham in 2013 with a view to returning to management. In July 2014 he returned to Gillingham as assistant manager under manager Peter Taylor, and was appointed joint caretaker manager, along with Darren Hare, Steve Lovell and Mark Patterson, following the sacking of Taylor on 31 December 2014. At the end of the 2014–15 season, Hessenthaler left the club to become assistant manager at Leyton Orient. In April 2016, he was promoted to the position of manager when player-manager Kevin Nolan was stripped of his managerial responsibilities, however Hessenthaler was sacked in September of the same year. In April 2017 Hessenthaler was appointed as assistant manager of National League club Eastleigh, and in November of the same year stepped up to the role of manager.

In October 2018 he returned to Dover as manager following the sacking of Chris Kinnear. During the 2020–21 season, Dover chairman Jim Parmenter confirmed in February that all staff had been furloughed and they would be playing no additional fixtures, leading to the club starting the 2021–22 season on minus-12 points. After a switch back to operating as a part-time club and retaining just four players, a disastrous season followed and after picking up just eight points in 33 matches, a 2–0 defeat to Yeovil Town on 19 March left the club thirty five points from safety with just eleven matches left to be played, seeing the club relegated to the National League South. His contract with the club was cancelled by mutual consent on 5 January 2023, and on the same day he returned to Gillingham as Head of Recruitment.

== Personal life ==
Hessenthaler's mother died in 1991, shortly before his first professional match. His father was an aspiring footballer and was at one time on the books of Arsenal, but never played professionally. He is married to Nikki and has a daughter, Jasmine, and a son, Jake, who also became a professional footballer, making his debut for Gillingham in December 2013. His brother-in-law, Darren Hare, has served as the youth team manager at Gillingham, while his nephew, Josh Hare, came through the youth set-up at Gillingham and went on to play professionally.

== Managerial statistics ==
As of match played 1 January 2023

Managerial record by team and tenure
Team	From	To	Record				
Team	From	To	P	W	D	L	Win %
Gillingham	29 June 2000	23 November 2004	228	77	54	97	33.8
Dover Athletic	29 May 2007	20 May 2010	157	101	25	31	64.3
Gillingham	21 May 2010	10 May 2012	101	39	29	33	38.6
Gillingham (joint caretaker*)	31 December 2014	7 February 2015	8	3	2	3	37.5
Leyton Orient	12 April 2016	26 September 2016	16	7	2	7	43.8
Eastleigh	18 December 2017	8 October 2018	37	15	8	14	40.5
Dover Athletic	8 October 2018	5 January 2023	167	46	37	84	27.5
Total			714	288	157	269	40.34

Hessenthaler's third spell in management at Gillingham was as part of a team of four joint caretaker managers, along with Steve Lovell, Darren Hare, and Mark Patterson.

== Honours ==
=== As a player ===
Gillingham

- Football League Second Division play-offs: 2000

Hull City

- Football League One runner up: 2004–05

Individual

- Gillingham Player of the Season: 1996–97, 1999–2000
- Named Gillingham's "Greatest Ever Player" in a 2005 fan poll and by the Professional Footballer's Association in 2007

=== As a manager ===
Dover Athletic

- Isthmian League Division One South: 2007–08
- Isthmian League Premier Division: 2008–09

Individual

- Football League Two Manager of the Month: December 2010
- National League Manager of the Month: April 2019
