= Darren Carr =

English footballer

Personal information
- Date of birth: 4 September 1968 (age 58)
- Place of birth: Bristol, England
- Height: 1.88 m (6 ft 2 in)
- Position: Defender

Senior career*
| Years | Team | Apps | (Gls) |
| 1986–1987 | Bristol Rovers | 24 | (0) |
| 1987–1988 | Newport County | 9 | (0) |
| 1988–1990 | Sheffield United | 12 | (1) |
| 1990–1993 | Crewe Alexandra | 96 | (5) |
| 1993–1998 | Chesterfield | 84 | (4) |
| 1998–1999 | Gillingham | 22 | (2) |
| 1999–2001 | Brighton & Hove Albion | 18 | (0) |
| 2000–2001 | → Rotherham United (loan) | 1 | (0) |
| 2001 | → Lincoln City (loan) | 3 | (0) |
| 2001 | → Carlisle United (loan) | 10 | (0) |
| 2001–2002 | Dover Athletic | 1 | (0) |
| 2002 | Rushden & Diamonds | 1 | (0) |
| 2002–2005 | Bath City | | |
- * Club domestic league appearances and goals as of 21 May 2021

Darren Carr (born 4 September 1968) is an English retired football defender. In the 1996–97 season, he was part of Chesterfield's historic run to the FA Cup semi final, coming on as a substitute in both the semi-final and semi final replay against Middlesbrough.

== Honours ==
Chesterfield

- Football League Third Division play-offs: 1995
