= Mick Galloway =

English footballer (born 1974)

Personal information
- Full name: Michael Anthony Galloway
- Date of birth: 13 October 1974 (age 52)
- Place of birth: Nottingham, England
- Position: Midfielder

Senior career*
Years	Team	Apps	(Gls)
1993–1997	Notts County	21	(0)
1997–1999	Gillingham	75	(5)
1999	→ Lincoln City (loan)	5	(0)
1999–2000	Chesterfield	20	(1)
2000–2003	Carlisle United	35	(1)
2002	→ Gretna (loan)	?	(?)
2002	→ Hereford United (loan)	9	(0)
2003–2004	Gretna	56	(6)
2004–2005	Stirling Albion	9	(0)
2005	Workington	15	(0)
2005	Eastwood Town	10	(1)
2006	Northbank Carlisle	?	(?)
2007	Penrith United	14	(0)
2007	Cowdenbeath	13	(0)
2007–2008	Workington	4	(0)
2008–2008/2009	Hucknall Town	3	(0)
2008/2009–	Worksop Town		

Managerial career
- 2006: Northbank Carlisle
- 2008: Hucknall Town
- 2010: Gedling Town
- ?–2013: Long Eaton United
- * Club domestic league appearances and goals as of 00:00, 16 March 2008 (UTC)

Michael Anthony Galloway (born 13 October 1974) is an English former footballer who played as a midfielder. He was appointed caretaker manager for Hucknall Town's final game of the 2007-08 season, before being appointed as the club's permanent manager along with Andy Miller. In October 2008, they were dismissed. He then quickly joined Worksop Town as a player, he scored an excellent free kick on his debut away at Witton Albion which delighted the travelling support.

In November 2010 he resigned his post as manager of Gedling Town.
