= Mark Patterson (footballer, born 1968) =

English footballer (born 1968)

Personal information
- Date of birth: 13 September 1968 (age 58)
- Place of birth: Leeds, England
- Position: Defender

Senior career*
Years	Team	Apps	(Gls)
1986–1987	Carlisle United	22	(0)
1987–1993	Derby County	51	(3)
1993–1997	Plymouth Argyle	134	(3)
1997–2002	Gillingham	124	(2)
Total		331	(8)

Managerial career
- 2014–2015: Gillingham (co-caretaker)
- 2019: Gillingham (caretaker)
- * Club domestic league appearances and goals

Mark Patterson (born 13 September 1968 in Leeds) is an English former professional footballer. He played over 300 Football League matches for Carlisle United, Derby County, Plymouth Argyle and Gillingham between 1986 and 2002.

== Playing career ==
Patterson began his career as a trainee with Carlisle United, turning professional in 1986, but after just 22 matches was signed by Derby County, then in the First Division for £60,000. He had to wait four years before making his first team debut, which came in November 1991 and, although he appeared to be on the verge of becoming a first-team regular, he was then sidelined by injury for several months and could not regain his place. In July 1993 he moved to Plymouth Argyle, who paid £85,000 for his services.

Patterson played over 130 Football League matches for Plymouth before being sold to Gillingham for £45,000 in October 1997. He made over 120 appearances for the Kent club but was forced to retire in 2002 due to injury.

== Post-playing career ==
Patterson had a spell as assistant manager at Folkestone Invicta but left in 2006 to return to Gillingham as youth team manager. until March 2010. Patterson returned to the club as development coach, and subsequently assistant to manager Steve Lovell, and became caretaker manager when Lovell was sacked shortly before the end of the 2018–19 season.

== Honours ==
Plymouth Argyle

- Football League Third Division play-offs: 1996
