= Paul Scally =

British businessman

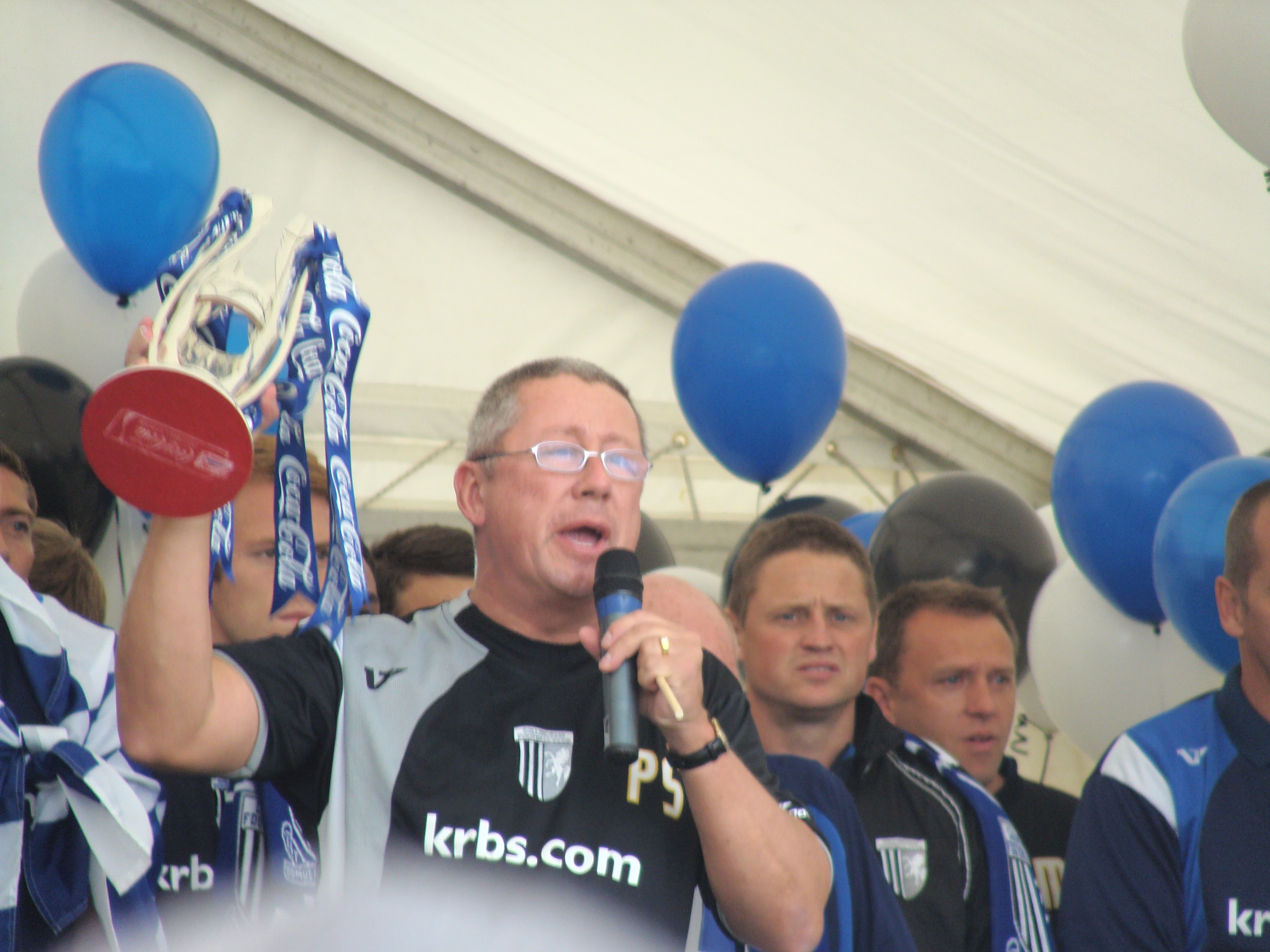
- Born: 1955 or 1956 (age 69–70); London
- Occupations: Former chairman of Gillingham F.C., former owner of a photocopier company
- Spouse(s): 1. Ellen; 2. Lisa Marie; 3. Sara
- Children: 7

Paul Damien Phillip Scally (born 1955 or 1956) is a London-born businessman who served as the chairman of Gillingham Football Club between 1995 and 2022.

== Career ==
Scally became wealthy through the sale of his Metronote photocopier business in South London and retired to study part-time for a law degree at Greenwich University. Prior to starting Metronote he "owned a motor racing team, flew his own plane in his own flying club, ran LBC's eye-in-the-sky traffic monitor and operated companies which dealt in everything from computers to champagne".

Scally bought Gillingham F.C. for the sum of £1 in 1995. In doing so, he took the Kent side out of administration, taking on debts of £1.5m to £2m shortly before they would have been placed into liquidation. His tenure is the most successful period in the club's history, with three promotions, three Wembley play-off finals, four FA Cup victories over top division opponents, their furthest FA Cup run (quarter-final in 1999–2000), their joint-furthest League Cup runs (fourth round in 1996–97 and 2022-23) and their highest league finish of 11th in the Championship. At the time of his departure from the role Scally's 27 years in charge of Gillingham made him second-longest serving Chairman in English football after Steve Gibson of Middlesbrough.

He has also overseen the radical redevelopment of the club's Priestfield Stadium, adding a banqueting suite and a total of four new stands, three permanent and one temporary, transforming it into an all-seater arena. However the club's fortunes both on and off the pitch took a downhill turn from about 2004, arising mainly from his overspending on the new stands and facilities, and also the loss of anticipated income following the collapse of ITV Digital.

Scally is the sole owner of Priestfield Developments Ltd., a company formed in 2007 with the sole purpose of purchasing Gillingham's Priestfield Stadium for £9.8m as part of the restructuring of the club's debts.

Having sought investment into the club for a number of years, he told BBC Sport in December 2021 that he had not "yet come across anyone who will come in and take the club over - unless I stay and run it for them, or with them". In August 2022 Scally announced that he would taking an “extended break” and appointed the club's former Finance Director Paul Fisher as co-chairman and chief executive, to handle the day to day running of the club.

On 23 December 2022, US-based property magnate Brad Galinson purchased the majority shareholding in Gillingham Football Club Ltd, with Scally retaining a minority shareholding in the club and remaining a board member. Scally continued to serve as a director until he was voted out of the position by the shareholders in October 2024.

== Controversy ==
Scally expressed desire to relocate the club from the town of Gillingham, possibly to a location away from the Medway Towns though still somewhere within the county of Kent, claiming "The future of this football club is not at this stadium and everyone, if they are not stupid, accepts that is a fundamental point."

He summarily dismissed manager Tony Pulis immediately after he had led the team to a Wembley Stadium play-off final in 1999, which brought about a protracted legal dispute over Pulis' contract.

He has also become involved in a number of public disputes, most notably with several other Football League clubs over player transfers, the Kent Messenger Group of local newspapers (whose reporters he banned from the ground for several years for supposedly criticizing poor team performances), and Alan Liptrott, chairman of the Gills Independent Supporters Club, with whom he had several public disagreements, the largest over the ownership of an internet domain name, which led to Scally imposing a lifetime ban from Priestfield on Liptrott. However, on 8 February 2007, Scally unexpectedly rescinded the ban after approximately six years.

== Personal life ==
Scally grew up in Blackheath, and prior to buying Gillingham had been a fan of Millwall.

As of 2009, Scally was non-resident in the UK for tax purposes, and resided in Dubai.

He has been married three times and has had seven children. One of his sons died after a fall at the age of one, and another of a heart defect in 2003 at the age of 16 weeks. His surviving children comprise two daughters and three sons, one of whom was imprisoned for two years in January 2009 having been found guilty of causing grievous bodily harm to a 15 year old boy; another son, Adam, has been employed by the club as editor of Gillingham's matchday programme.
