= 2000–01 Gillingham F.C. season =

English football club season

Gillingham
2000–01 season
- Chairman: Paul Scally
- Manager: Andy Hessenthaler
- First Division: 13th
- FA Cup: Fourth round
- League Cup: Second round
- Top goalscorer: League: Marlon King (15); All: Marlon King (15)
- Highest home attendance: 10,518 (v Crystal Palace, 26 December 2000)
- Lowest home attendance: 2,743 (v Torquay United, 22 August 2000)
Home colours	Away colours

During the 2000–01 English football season, Gillingham F.C. competed in the Football League First Division, the second tier of the English football league system. It was the 69th season in which Gillingham competed in the Football League, and the 51st since the club was voted back into the league in 1950. In the preceding season, Gillingham had beaten Wigan Athletic in the Second Division play-off final to gain promotion to the second tier of English football for the first time in the club's history. Having led the team to promotion, manager Peter Taylor left the club after a single season to become manager of FA Premier League club Leicester City and was replaced by veteran player Andy Hessenthaler. In his first season as manager, he led Gillingham to a mid-table finish in the First Division.

Gillingham also competed in two knock-out tournaments. In the FA Cup the team reached the fourth round but then lost to Chelsea of the Premier League. The team were also eliminated from the Football League Cup by a Premier League team, losing to Manchester City in the second round. Gillingham played 52 competitive matches, winning 15, drawing 17, and losing 20. Marlon King, a new signing at the start of the season, was the team's top goalscorer with 15 goals. Vince Bartram and Chris Hope made the most appearances; both played in all 52 of the team's matches. The highest attendance recorded at the club's home ground, Priestfield Stadium, was 10,518 for the visit of Crystal Palace on 26 December.

== Background and pre-season ==
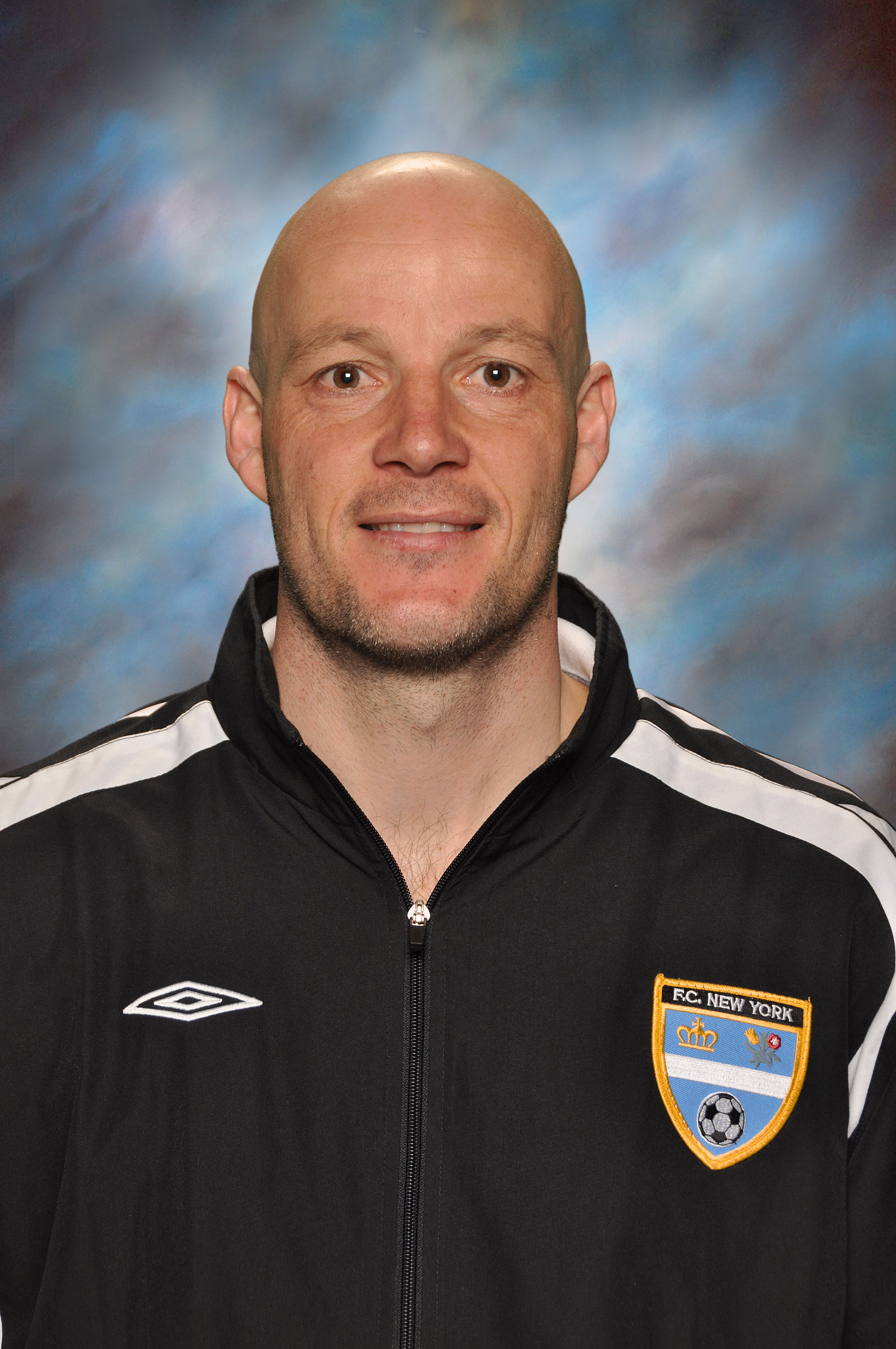
Paul Shaw (pictured in 2011) was one of the club's summer signings.

The 2000–01 season was Gillingham's 69th season playing in the Football League and the 51st since the club was elected back into the League in 1950 after being voted out in 1938. In the previous season, the team had finished third in the Football League Second Division and qualified for the play-offs for promotion to the First Division. After defeating Stoke City in the semi-finals, Gillingham beat Wigan Athletic in the final to reach the second tier of the English football league system for the first time in the club's history. Following promotion, Gillingham offered a new contract to manager Peter Taylor to remain in charge for the 2000–01 season. He rejected it, however, and left to take over at FA Premier League team Leicester City, replacing Martin O'Neill, who had moved to Celtic. Veteran Gillingham player Andy Hessenthaler was appointed player-manager to replace Taylor, his first managerial appointment.

The club signed three new players ahead of the first competitive game of the new season, two of whom were forwards. Hessenthaler's first signing as manager was Marlon King, a forward, who joined from Barnet of the Third Division for a transfer fee of £250,000 (equivalent to £530,000 in 2023). King, aged 20, had reportedly attracted interest from Premier League clubs and was viewed as a highly promising prospect for the future. The second new forward to join the club was Paul Shaw, who was signed from Millwall for £450,000 (equivalent to £960,000 in 2023), at the time the third-highest transfer fee paid by Gillingham. The third new signing was a defender: Chris Hope arrived from Scunthorpe United for £250,000 (equivalent to £530,000 in 2023). In an interview with the Sunday Times, Hessenthaler stated that he had "told the boys we want to try and make the play-offs". Despite this, Gillingham were picked as one of the three teams most likely to be relegated from the First Division by Jason Tomas of The Observer.

The club adopted a new kit, replacing the previous season's blue and black striped shirts, black shorts and black socks with plain blue shirts, white shorts and blue socks. The away kit, to be worn in the event of a clash of colours with the home team, consisted of white shirts, blue shorts and white socks. The team prepared for the new season with a number of friendly matches, including one against Manchester City of the Premier League. At the start of the season, building work was ongoing at the club's home ground, Priestfield Stadium. The new Medway Stand, replacing an older grandstand demolished a year earlier, was open to spectators but the work had not been completed on all its facilities.

== First Division ==
=== August–December ===
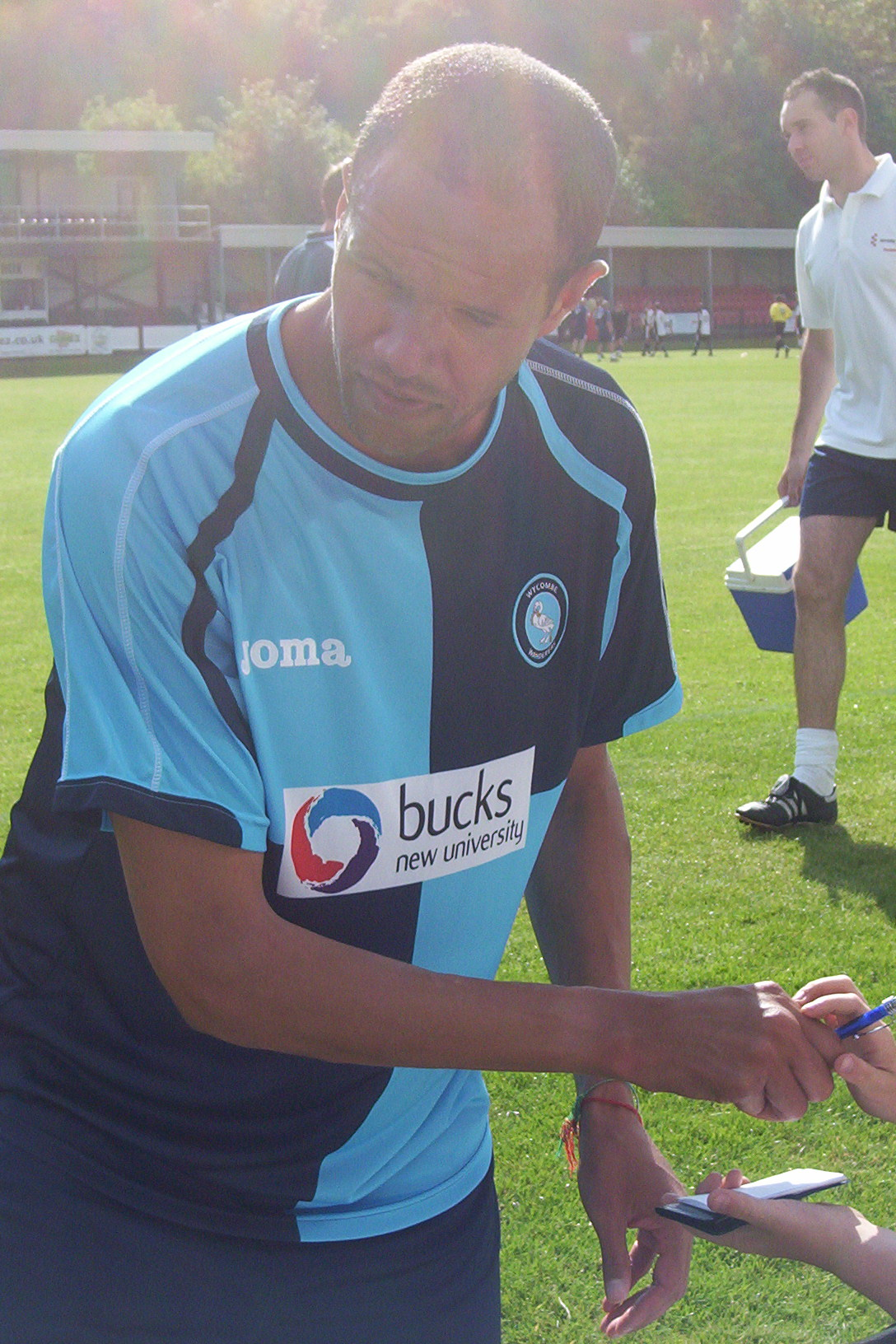
Junior Lewis (pictured in 2009) scored the goal which secured Gillingham's first ever win in the second tier of English football.

Gillingham's first match in the second tier of English football was at home to Stockport County. Guy Butters scored the club's first goal at that level in the second minute of the game, but Stockport scored three times to claim the win. Hessenthaler described the result as "a wake-up call". Shaw and Hope made their debuts in the starting line-up and King made his as a substitute; Shaw was stretchered off in the first half after suffering an ankle injury which would keep him out of the team for the next six weeks. Andy Thomson replaced him in the starting line-up for the game away to Tranmere Rovers, which Gillingham lost 3–2. In both of the next two First Division games, at home to Portsmouth and away to Burnley, Gillingham took the lead but then conceded an equalising goal; each of the matches finished as a draw. The Guardian's correspondent wrote that Gillingham were the better team against Portsmouth although Hessenthaler said that his team's play had been "a little bit too predictable". After four games, Gillingham were 21st in the 24-team league table. The team won their first league match of the season at the fifth attempt, defeating Wolverhampton Wanderers 1–0 at Priestfield with a fourth-minute goal by Junior Lewis, but then lost away to Grimsby Town. In the second half of September, Gillingham won at home to struggling Huddersfield Town, managed by former Gillingham player Steve Bruce, but then lost 3–0 away to Fulham, who continued a run of having won every First Division game since the start of the season. Hessenthaler commented "we just couldn't get near them ... quite frankly I'm pleased it was only 3–0". King was included in the starting line-up for the first time in early September but after failing to score in five starts he reverted to the role of substitute, with Thomson preferred as a starter.

Gillingham drew 4–4 away to Wimbledon on 14 October, the only match in the entirety of the First Division during the 2000–01 season to feature eight or more goals, which prompted Hessenthaler to say "We'll be straight back on the training ground to work on our defending as we keep getting punished by decent sides." His opposite number Terry Burton noted that the Gillingham team had taken on the qualities which Hessenthaler displayed as a player, saying "Their spirit epitomises what their manager is all about ... He gives 100 per cent and has taken that infectious enthusiasm into management". Gillingham then failed to score any goals in the next four league matches. Carl Asaba, the team's top goalscorer in all competitions at this point in the season, was substituted in the second of these games, a goalless draw at home to Barnsley, after injuring his hamstring; he would not play again for more than six weeks. Iffy Onuora, who had been a regular in the team in the second half of the previous season but had yet to start a game in the 2000–01 season, replaced him for the next five games but then reverted to being used only as a substitute. The goalless run came to an end with a 2–1 victory away to Sheffield United on 4 November, Gillingham's first league win for seven games and first away league win of the season, but the team then lost both their next two games 3–1. King scored his first goal for the club in the second of these defeats. Victory away to Blackburn Rovers in the last game of November, achieved despite Shaw being sent off, left Gillingham 14th in the table. Ron Clarke of the Sunday Times wrote that Blackburn had been arrogant in their approach to the game in the first half and allowed Gillingham to score two simple goals.

Gillingham began December with consecutive league defeats at home to Birmingham City and away to Norwich City, but then beat Preston North End 4–0 at Priestfield, beginning an unbeaten league run which would ultimately last for nine games. Asaba scored twice against Preston on his return to the starting line-up. The team's final game of 2000 resulted in a 4–1 win at home to Crystal Palace; Asaba scored the team's first hat-trick of the season but Shaw was again carried off on a stretcher after suffering another ankle injury, although on this occasion he did not miss any games. The attendance of 10,518 was the highest for any match at Priestfield during the season. An aggressive confrontation took place shortly before the end of the first half involving players from both teams which led to both clubs being fined by the Football Association four months later. The result left Gillingham 13th in the table at the end of the year.

=== January–May ===
Gillingham's first four league matches of 2001 were all drawn. The first two, away to Portsmouth and at home to Burnley, finished goalless, and Gillingham followed this with a 2–2 draw away to Crystal Palace and a 1–1 draw away to Wolverhampton Wanderers. Following the Crystal Palace game, Brian Scovell of the Sunday Telegraph described Gillingham as "one of the best organised sides in the First Division". King replaced Asaba in the starting line-up against Wolverhampton Wanderers, his first start since before Christmas, and scored his team's goal; he would go on to start every game for the remainder of the season. Gillingham extended their unbeaten league run with victories at home to Grimsby Town and away to Huddersfield Town, in both of which King scored the winning goal. Hessenthaler was extremely pleased with his team's recent performances and told the media "If we can now consolidate this year, our aim will then be to do what Crewe have done and see if we can stay in this division for the next four or five years". Huddersfield manager Lou Macari contended that Gillingham were "the kind of team capable of upsetting anybody in this division". The wins took Gillingham into the top half of the table in 12th place, but the unbeaten run came to an end in the next game with a 1–0 defeat at home to Queens Park Rangers. Gillingham lost their next two games, 2–0 at home to Fulham and 2–1 away to Sheffield Wednesday. Asaba scored against Sheffield Wednesday after coming on a substitute in what would prove to be his last appearance for Gillingham; he was transferred to Sheffield United in March.

Although the series of consecutive defeats ended with a 0–0 draw at home to Wimbledon on 6 March, it meant that Gillingham had only scored once in the last four matches and slipped to 15th in the league table. Onuora replaced Shaw against Wimbledon, his first start since November; Shaw had still yet to score a goal since his transfer to the club. On 10 March, Gillingham came back from 3–1 down to draw 3–3 away to Bolton Wanderers, King scoring the equaliser in the final five minutes of the game, and then won at home to Tranmere Rovers with goals from King and Onuora, who had now been the starting forwards for three consecutive matches and would remain so for the rest of the season. Hessenthaler signed another forward, Guy Ipoua, from Scunthorpe United for £25,000 (equivalent to £50,000 in 2023), but he was used only as a substitute for the remainder of the season. Shaw returned to the starting line-up against Barnsley on 25 March but was now used in a linking role between the midfield and the forwards rather than as an all-out attacking player. Onuora scored the team's second hat-trick of the season in a 4–3 win at home to Norwich City on 7 April and Gillingham then scored four goals for a second consecutive game as they defeated Sheffield United 4–1; Shaw scored his first goal for the club in the latter game. The next two games, however, resulted in defeats to Crewe Alexandra and West Bromwich Albion.

Victory in the game away to Nottingham Forest on 28 April would mean that Gillingham were sufficiently far ahead of the bottom three places that they could not finish in a relegation position. King scored the only goal in a 1–0 win which ensured that the team would be playing in the First Division again the following season. In the final match of the 2000–01 season, Gillingham played Blackburn Rovers, who had already clinched promotion to the Premier League, at Priestfield. Blackburn held the lead for most of the game, but King scored an equaliser in the last minute to secure a draw. Gillingham ended their first season in the second tier of English football 13th in the league table.

=== Match details ===
Key

- In result column, Gillingham's score shown first
- H = Home match
- A = Away match
- pen. = Penalty kick
- o.g. = Own goal

Results

Date	Opponents	Result	Goalscorers	Attendance
12 August 2000	Stockport County (H)	1–3	Butters	9,429
19 August 2000	Tranmere Rovers (A)	2–3	Asaba, Southall (pen.)	8,355
25 August 2000	Portsmouth (H)	1–1	Thomson	8,741
28 August 2000	Burnley (A)	1–1	Asaba	15,611
2 September 2000	Wolverhampton Wanderers (H)	1–0	Lewis	10,017
9 September 2000	Grimsby Town (A)	0–1		4,512
13 September 2000	Queens Park Rangers (A)	2–2	Asaba, Hessenthaler	10,655
16 September 2000	Huddersfield Town (H)	2–1	Butters, Smith	8,503
23 September 2000	Fulham (A)	0–3		13,032
30 September 2000	Sheffield Wednesday (H)	2–0	Butters, Thomson	9,099
6 October 2000	Bolton Wanderers (H)	2–2	Smith, Onuora	9,311
14 October 2000	Wimbledon (A)	4–4	Thomson (2), Saunders, Asaba	9,030
17 October 2000	Watford (A)	0–0		12,356
21 October 2000	Barnsley (H)	0–0		9,030
25 October 2000	Birmingham City (A)	0–1		26,044
28 October 2000	Crewe Alexandra (H)	0–1		8,347
4 November 2000	Sheffield United (A)	2–1	Smith, Thomson	14,028
12 November 2000	Nottingham Forest (H)	1–3	Onuora	9,884
18 November 2000	West Bromwich Albion (A)	1–3	King	16,410
25 November 2000	Blackburn Rovers (A)	2–1	Hessenthaler, Curtis (o.g.)	18,061
2 December 2000	Birmingham City (H)	1–2	King	9,247
9 December 2000	Norwich City (A)	0–1		16,725
16 December 2000	Preston North End (H)	4–0	Asaba (2), Ashby, King	8,198
23 December 2000	Stockport County (A)	2–2	Lewis, King	6,095
26 December 2000	Crystal Palace (H)	4–1	Asaba (3), Onuora	10,518
1 January 2001	Portsmouth (A)	0–0		14,526
13 January 2001	Burnley (H)	0–0		9,331
20 January 2001	Crystal Palace (A)	2–2	Saunders (2)	18,823
3 February 2001	Wolverhampton Wanderers (A)	1–1	King	26,627
10 February 2001	Grimsby Town (H)	1–0	King	8,633
17 February 2001	Huddersfield Town (A)	3–2	Saunders (2), King	10,576
20 February 2001	Queens Park Rangers (H)	0–1		10,432
24 February 2001	Fulham (H)	0–2		9,931
3 March 2001	Sheffield Wednesday (A)	1–2	Asaba	18,702
6 March 2001	Wimbledon (H)	0–0		8,841
10 March 2001	Bolton Wanderers (A)	3–3	King (2), Southall	13,161
20 March 2001	Tranmere Rovers (H)	2–1	King (pen.), Onuora	7,810
25 March 2001	Barnsley (A)	1–3	King	13,609
31 March 2001	Preston North End (A)	0–0		13,550
7 April 2001	Norwich City (H)	4–3	Hope, Onuora (3)	9,608
14 April 2001	Sheffield United (H)	4–1	Onuora, King (2), Shaw	9,502
16 April 2001	Crewe Alexandra (A)	1–2	Hope	7,051
21 April 2001	West Bromwich Albion (H)	1–2	Onuora	9,920
28 April 2001	Nottingham Forest (A)	1–0	King	20,670
1 May 2001	Watford (H)	0–3		9,098
6 May 2001	Blackburn Rovers (H)	1–1	King (pen.)	10,319

=== Partial league table ===
Football League First Division final table, positions 10–16
Pos	Team	Pld	W	D	L	GF	GA	GD	Pts
10	Sheffield United	46	19	11	16	52	49	+3	68
11	Nottingham Forest	46	20	8	18	55	53	+2	68
12	Wolverhampton Wanderers	46	14	13	19	45	48	−3	55
13	Gillingham	46	13	16	17	61	66	−5	55
14	Crewe Alexandra	46	15	10	21	47	62	−15	55
15	Norwich City	46	14	12	20	46	58	−12	54
16	Barnsley	46	15	9	22	49	62	−13	54

== Cup matches ==
=== FA Cup ===
As a First Division team, Gillingham entered the 2000–01 FA Cup at the third-round stage in early January. The team played AFC Bournemouth of the Second Division and won 3–2. Hessenthaler suffered a serious knee injury and would not play again during the season. In the fourth round, Gillingham were paired with Chelsea of the Premier League, who had eliminated Gillingham from the competition at the quarter-final stage in the previous season. By half-time, Gillingham were 3–0 down to their higher-level opponents. In the second half Shaw and Onuora both scored to reduce the deficit to a single goal, but Gillingham could not bring the scores level, and in the final minute Chelsea's Eiður Guðjohnsen scored to seal his team's win. Gillingham were thus eliminated from the FA Cup by Chelsea for the second consecutive season. Hessenthaler commented that "We made it hard for ourselves with our performance in the first half. You could see the difference in the leagues then and their class but we're disappointed with the way we defended".

==== Match details ====
Key

- In result column, Gillingham's score shown first
- H = Home match
- A = Away match
- pen. = Penalty kick
- o.g. = Own goal

Results

Date	Round	Opponents	Result	Goalscorers	Attendance
6 January 2001	Third	AFC Bournemouth (A)	3–2	Hope, Hessenthaler, Shaw	7,403
28 January 2001	Fourth	Chelsea (H)	2–4	Shaw, Onuora	10,419

=== League Cup ===
Gillingham entered the 2000–01 Football League Cup in the first round and were paired with Torquay United of the Third Division. In front of a crowd of 2,743, the lowest attendance recorded at Priestfield during the season, Gillingham won the first leg of the two-legged tie 2–0. Torquay won the second leg at their own ground, Plainmoor, 3–2, but Gillingham progressed to the next round by an aggregate score of 4–3. In the second round, Gillingham played Manchester City, the first competitive meeting between the two teams since City defeated Gillingham in the Second Division play-off final in May 1999. Gillingham held their higher-level opponents to a 1–1 draw at Maine Road in the first leg, prompting Oliver Kay of The Times to suggest that City would struggle to win the tie overall, but Gillingham lost the second leg at Priestfield 4–2 and were thus eliminated from the competition.

==== Match details ====
Key

- In result column, Gillingham's score shown first
- H = Home match
- A = Away match
- pen. = Penalty kick
- o.g. = Own goal

Results

Date	Round	Opponents	Result	Goalscorers	Attendance
22 August 2000	First (first leg)	Torquay United (H)	2–0	Asaba, Thomson	2,743
5 September 2000	First (second leg)	Torquay United (A)	2–3	Asaba, Aggrey (o.g.)	1,351
20 September 2000	Second (first leg)	Manchester City (A)	1–1	Smith	17,408
26 September 2000	Second (second leg)	Manchester City (H)	2–4	Thomson (2)	6,520

== Players ==
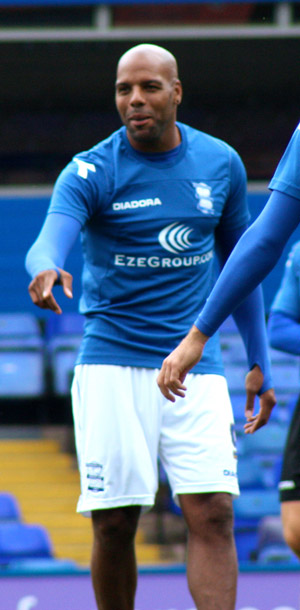
Marlon King (pictured in 2012) was the team's top goalscorer.

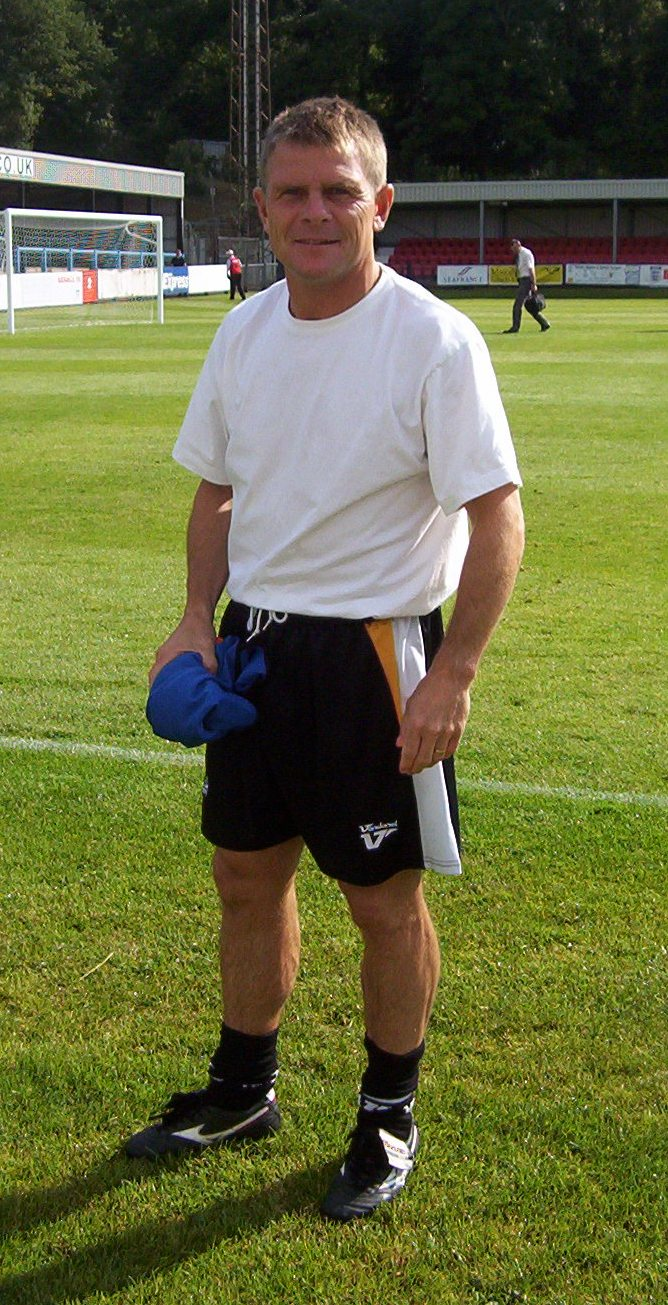
Player-manager Andy Hessenthaler (pictured in 2009) made 27 appearances.

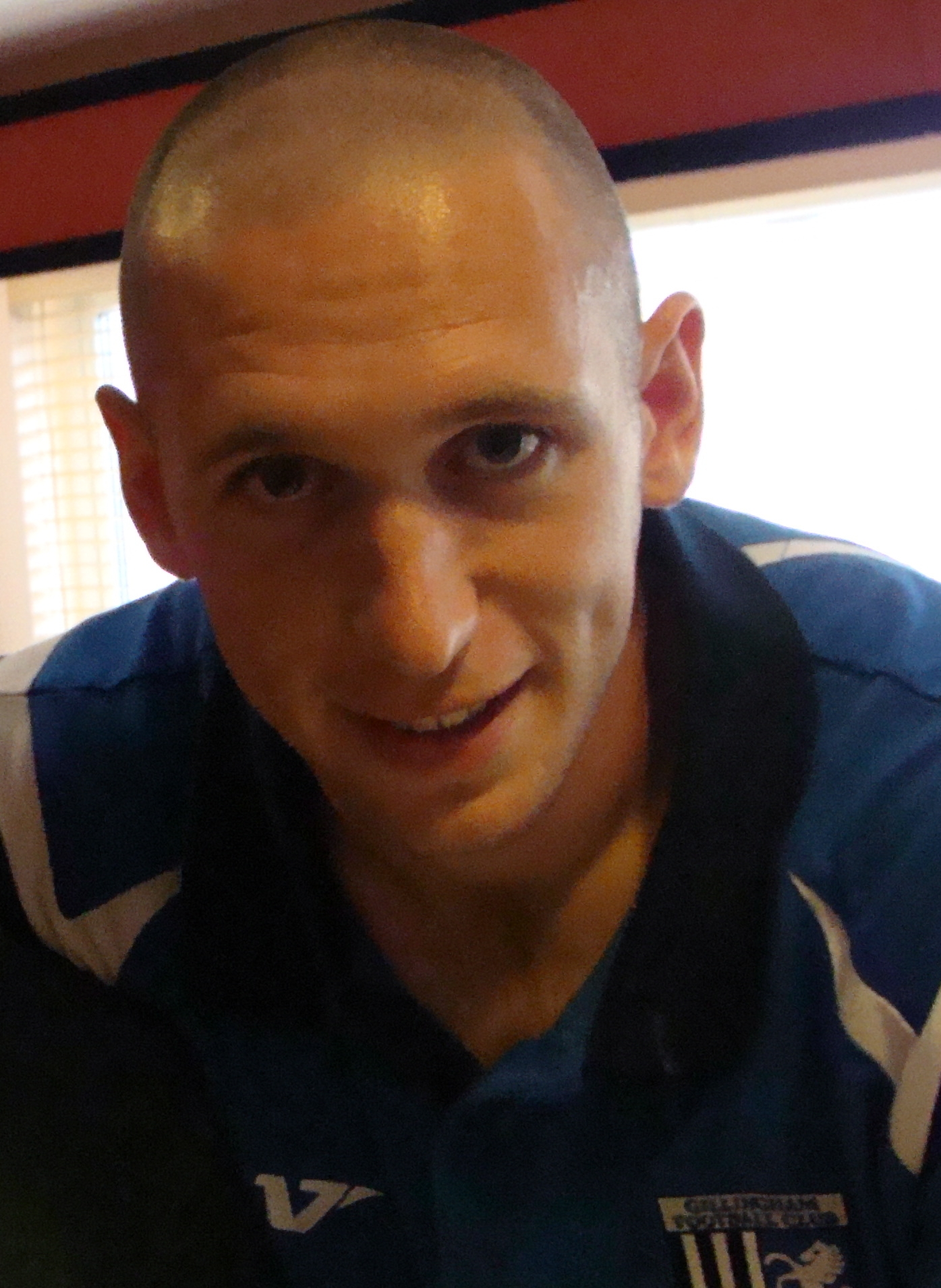
Andrew Crofts (pictured in 2008) made his professional debut at the age of 16.

Twenty-eight players made at least one appearance for Gillingham during the season. Bartram and Hope made the most appearances; both played every one of the team's 52 competitive matches. As they were in the starting line-up for every game and not substituted at any point, both played every minute of competitive football during the team's season. Five players made only one appearance each. Three of them were teenagers from the club's youth team, who were selected to make their debuts for the first team once Gillingham had secured their place in the First Division for another season. Of these, Andrew Crofts would go on to play nearly 200 times for the Gillingham first team and later play in the Premier League and for the Wales national team, but the single appearances made by Mark Lovell and Michael Phillips would prove to be the entirety of the two players' professional careers.

Thirteen players scored at least one goal for Gillingham during the season. King was the top scorer with 15 goals, all of them in First Division matches. Two other players reached double figures: Asaba scored 10 league goals and 12 in total and Onuora 9 league goals and 10 in total.

Player statistics
No.	Player	Position	First Division		FA Cup		League Cup		Total	
No.	Player	Position	Apps	Goals	Apps	Goals	Apps	Goals	Apps	Goals
1	Vince Bartram	GK	46	0	2	0	4	0	52	0
2	Mark Patterson	DF	28	0	2	0	3	0	33	0
3	Roland Edge	DF	20	0	2	0	3	0	25	0
4	Paul Smith	MF	42	3	2	0	2	1	46	4
5	Barry Ashby	DF	40	1	1	0	3	0	44	1
6	Guy Butters	DF	12	3	1	0	4	0	17	3
7	Nicky Southall	MF	44	2	2	0	3	0	49	2
8	Andy Hessenthaler	MF	23	2	1	1	3	0	27	3
9	Carl Asaba	FW	25	10	0	0	3	2	28	12
11	Ty Gooden	MF	18	0	0	0	2	0	20	0
12	Nyron Nosworthy	DF	10	0	0	0	0	0	10	0
14	Marcus Browning	MF	31	0	1	0	4	0	36	0
15	Mark Saunders	MF	35	5	1	0	2	0	38	5
16	Marlon King	FW	38	15	2	0	3	0	43	15
17	Adrian Pennock	DF	35	0	2	0	0	0	37	0
18	Chris Hope	DF	46	2	2	1	4	0	52	3
23	Richard Rose	DF	4	0	0	0	0	0	4	0
24^{[a]}	Junior Lewis	MF	17	2	2	0	4	0	23	2
24^{[a]}	Mark Lovell	FW	1	0	0	0	0	0	1	0
25^{[a]}	Brian McGlinchey	DF	1	0	0	0	0	0	1	0
25^{[a]}	Michael Phillips	MF	1	0	0	0	0	0	1	0
26	Kevin James	MF	7	0	0	0	1	0	8	0
27^{[a]}	Andy Thomson	FW	24	5	1	0	3	3	28	8
27^{[a]}	Andrew Crofts	MF	1	0	0	0	0	0	1	0
28	Rodney Rowe	FW	0	0	0	0	1	0	1	0
29	Iffy Onuora	FW	31	9	2	1	0	0	33	10
30	Paul Shaw	FW	33	1	2	2	0	0	35	3
31	Guy Ipoua	FW	9	0	0	0	0	0	9	0

FW = Forward, MF = Midfielder, GK = Goalkeeper, DF = Defender

a. Lovell, Phillips and Crofts were not allocated squad numbers until late in the season and were given numbers worn earlier in the season by players who had since left the club.

== Aftermath ==
After the final game of the season, Hessenthaler told the media that his team had exceeded pre-season expectations, saying "to finish 13th is a fantastic effort and we've proved a few pundits and experts wrong". Gillingham's final league position improved in each of the next two seasons, culminating in the club's best ever finish of 11th in the First Division in the 2002–03 season. The team then spent two further seasons in the second tier before being relegated in 2005.
