= 1999–2000 Gillingham F.C. season =

English football club season

Gillingham
1999–2000 season
- Chairman: Paul Scally
- Manager: Peter Taylor
- Second Division: 3rd (promoted via play-offs)
- FA Cup: Sixth round
- League Cup: Second round
- League Trophy: First round
- Top goalscorer: League: Robert Taylor (15); All: Robert Taylor (18)
- Highest home attendance: 10,386 (v Stoke City, 17 May 2000)
- Lowest home attendance: 2,718 (v Torquay United, 7 December 1999)
Home colours	Away colours

During the 1999–2000 English football season, Gillingham F.C. competed in the Football League Second Division, the third tier of the English football league system. It was the 68th season in which Gillingham competed in the Football League, and the 50th since the club was voted back into the league in 1950. The team started the season in poor form, failing to win any of the first five league games, but then went on a much-improved run and began challenging for promotion to the Football League First Division. Robert Taylor scored 18 goals in 19 games by November, after which he was signed by Manchester City for £1.5 million, a new record fee for Gillingham. On the last day of the regular season, the team had a chance to gain automatic promotion, but lost and instead had to enter the play-offs. After defeating Stoke City in the semi-finals, Gillingham beat Wigan Athletic in the final to gain promotion to the second tier of the English football league system for the first time in the club's history.

Gillingham also had their best run to date in the FA Cup, beating two Premier League teams before being knocked out by a third, Chelsea, at the quarter-final stage. The team reached the second round of the Football League Cup but were eliminated in the first round of the Football League Trophy. The team played 62 competitive matches, winning 34, drawing 12, and losing 16. Despite leaving the club before the mid-point of the season, Taylor was the team's top goalscorer with 18 goals. Nicky Southall made the most appearances, playing 59 times. The highest attendance recorded at the club's home ground, Priestfield Stadium, was 10,386, for the home leg of the play-off semi-final against Stoke City. Having led the team to promotion, manager Peter Taylor left the club after a single season to become manager of Leicester City of the Premier League.

== Background and pre-season ==
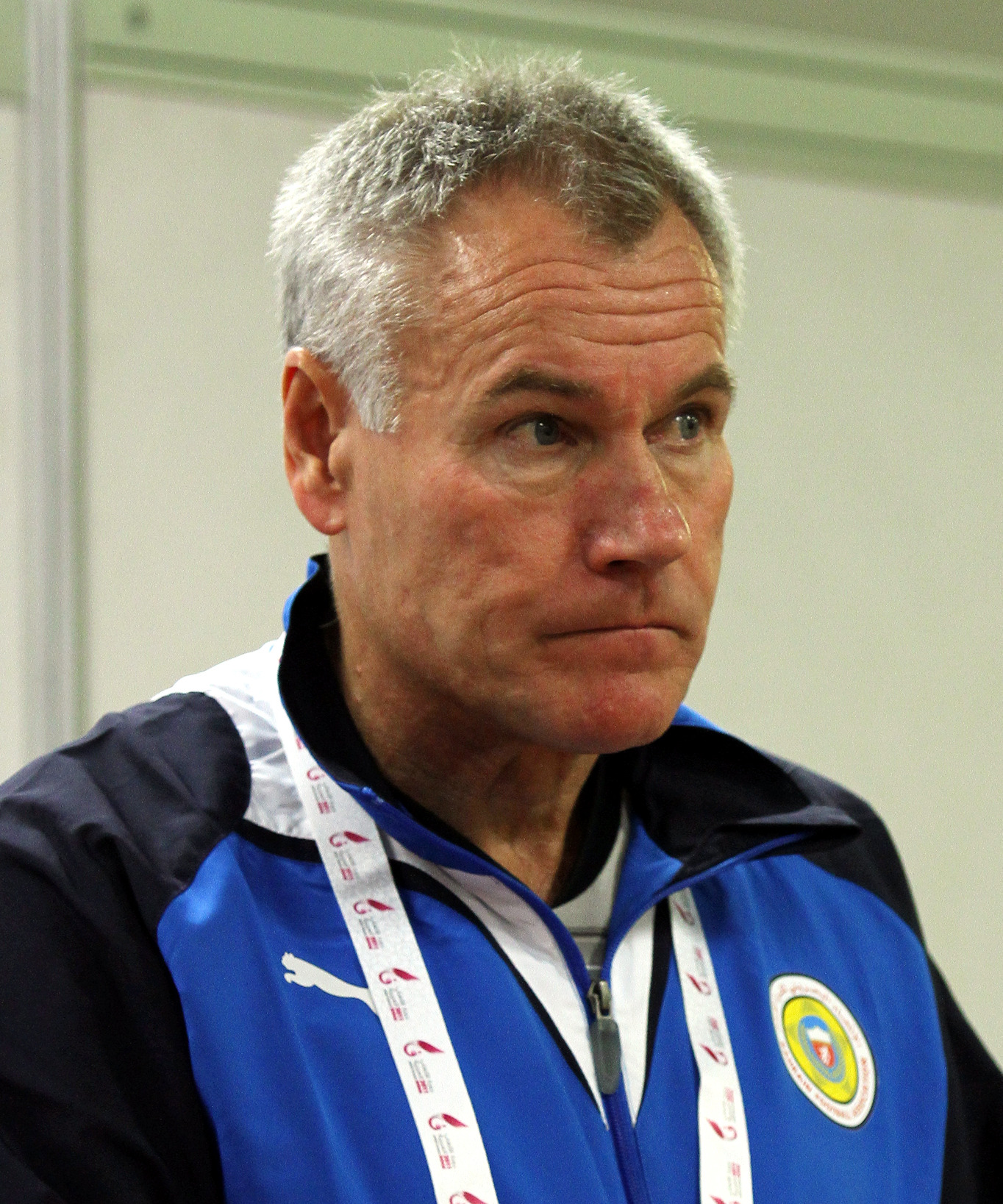
Peter Taylor (pictured in 2011) took over as manager before the season.

The 1999–2000 season was Gillingham's 68th season playing in the Football League and the 50th since the club was elected back into the League in 1950 after being voted out in 1938. It was the club's fourth consecutive season in the Football League Second Division, the third tier of the English football league system. In the 1998–99 season, Gillingham had reached the Second Division play-off final but lost to Manchester City following a penalty shoot-out and thus missed out on promotion to the First Division. One month after the play-off final, Tony Pulis was dismissed from his job as the club's manager, amid accusations of gross misconduct on his part, a decision which led to a lengthy and acrimonious court case between Pulis and club owner Paul Scally. In early July, Scally appointed Peter Taylor as the club's new manager; Taylor had left his post as head coach of the England under-21 team the previous month. The new manager appointed Andy Hessenthaler, who had played for the club since 1996, to a player-coach role; Steve Butler, who had left the club a year earlier, returned from Peterborough United to take up a similar position.

The club signed several other new players before the start of the season. Taylor's first signing was Junior Lewis, a midfielder who joined from non-League club Hendon; he had previously played under Taylor's management at Dover Athletic. Barry Miller, a defender, also stepped up from non-League football, having last played for Farnborough, and former Port Vale defender Brian McGlinchey also joined the club; both players had been released by their previous clubs at the end of the preceding season but played for Gillingham on a trial basis during pre-season and performed well enough to be offered contracts. Andy Thomson and Christian Lee, both forwards, were signed from Oxford United and Northampton Town respectively; Gillingham paid transfer fees of £25,000 for Thomson and £35,000 for Lee. The club also signed Anthony Williams on loan from Blackburn Rovers to act as back-up for Vince Bartram, the club's first-choice goalkeeper. The team prepared for the upcoming season with a number of friendly matches against non-League teams. Writing in The Times, Nick Szczepanik did not tip Gillingham for a top-six finish, stating that the team had "missed their chance" following the previous season's play-off final defeat.

Significant redevelopment work took place at the club's Priestfield Stadium in the close season. The Rainham End terracing was demolished and a new stand of the same name built in its place over the summer. The main stand was also demolished, but the work to build its replacement encountered various delays. The new Medway Stand did not open to spectators until the latter stages of the season, and some of the facilities would not be completed until more than a year after work began. The project also caused financial problems for the club, as the work eventually cost significantly more than had been originally estimated. The team's first-choice kit, featuring blue and black striped shirts, was unchanged from the previous season with the exception of local newspaper the Medway News replacing dairy brand Kool as the shirt sponsor. A new away kit, to be worn in the event of a clash of colours with the home team, was adopted, with yellow shirts replacing the previous season's black and red stripes.

== Second Division ==
=== August–December ===
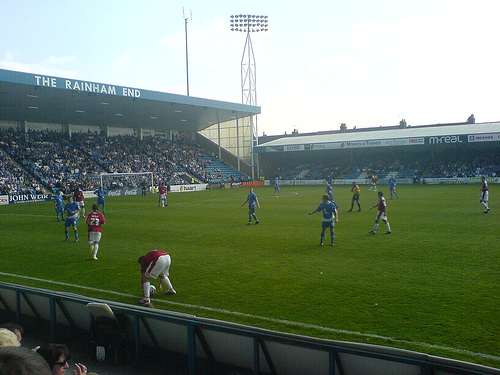
Gillingham's home ground, Priestfield Stadium, with the new Rainham End stand visible to the left

Gillingham began the season with an away game against Bury; Thomson scored on his debut but Gillingham lost 2–1. The first home game a week later against Bristol Rovers also resulted in a defeat. The team then gained three consecutive draws, and after five games were in 22nd position in the 24-team division. The match against Blackpool on 21 August included a controversial incident after Gillingham goalkeeper Bartram intentionally kicked the ball out of play so that an injured Blackpool player could receive medical treatment; when Blackpool took the throw-in they retained possession of the ball and scored the equalising goal. Manager Taylor was ejected from the technical area by the referee for entering the field of play and arguing with him over an unwritten rule that in such circumstances the player taking the throw-in returns the ball to the opposition.

Gillingham gained their first league win of the season at the sixth attempt on 4 September, defeating Oldham Athletic 2–1 after scoring two goals in the first six minutes of the match. The second was scored by Emmanuel Omoyinmi on his debut after joining on loan from West Ham United; the following week he scored again as Gillingham beat Oxford United 2–1 to move into the top half of the league table. The team then suffered another setback, losing to Preston North End. September ended with Gillingham in 15th place in the division.

On 9 October, Gillingham achieved their biggest win of the season, defeating Wrexham 5–1 at Priestfield; Robert Taylor scored a hat-trick inside the last half-hour of the game. Four games later, he repeated the feat, scoring all three goals in a 3–0 victory over Bristol City. That match marked Pulis's first appearance at Priestfield since his dismissal from the role of Gillingham manager, as he was now in charge of Bristol City; he received a standing ovation from the home fans. Taylor scored for the fifth consecutive game in a 4–1 win over Scunthorpe United on 23 November, taking his total to 15 goals in 15 Second Division games; two days later, he was signed by Manchester City for a transfer fee of £1.5 million, a new record for the highest fee received by Gillingham for a player. His initial replacement in the starting line-up was Rodney Rowe, a recent signing from York City. Despite losing their most prolific goalscorer, the team won their first three games without Taylor and were in fifth position in the league table after a 2–1 victory over Colchester United on 26 December. Gillingham's final match of 1999 resulted in a 2–0 defeat away to Wigan Athletic.

=== January–May ===
Gillingham signed two new players on 2 January, making them the first club in English professional football to conclude transfer business in the year 2000. Striker Iffy Onuora and midfielder Ty Gooden both joined from Swindon Town for a combined transfer fee of £200,000. It marked the start of a second spell at the club for Onuora, who had played for Gillingham between 1996 and 1998; he was a regular starter for the remainder of the season, with Rowe largely used only as a substitute. The team's first match of 2000 resulted in a 2–2 draw at home to Reading; Thomson gave Gillingham the lead in the 90th minute, but their opponents then equalised in injury time. The next two games both ended in defeat, and a goalless draw away to Chesterfield in the first match of February meant that the team had gone five games without a win. This left the team in seventh position in the table, albeit having played fewer games than all the teams above them.

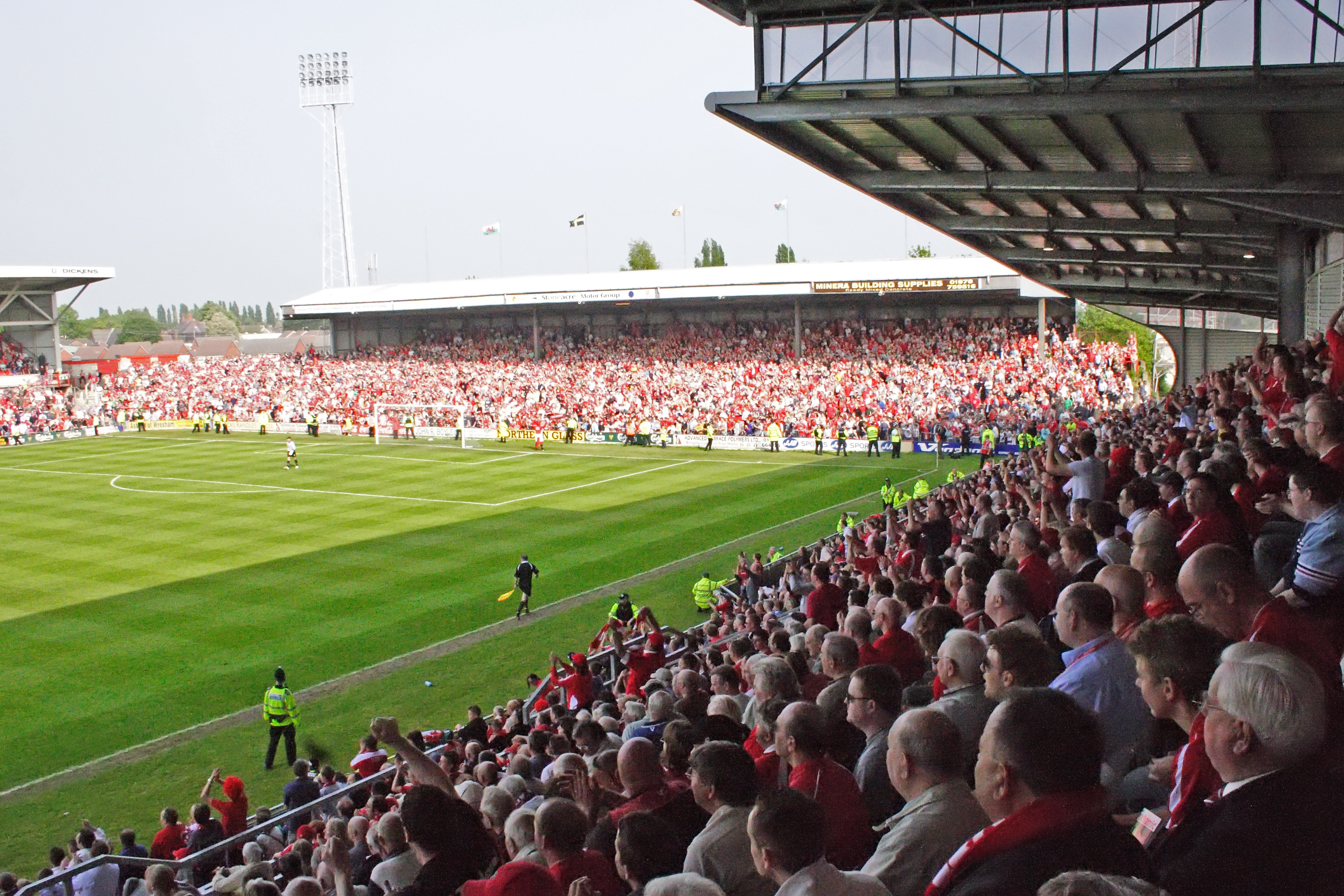
Defeat on the final day of the regular season at the Racecourse Ground, home of Wrexham, meant that Gillingham missed out on automatic promotion.

On 5 February, Gillingham won a Second Division match for the first time in 2000, defeating Stoke City 3–0. It was the start of a run of four consecutive victories, which also included a win away to Preston North End, who had been top of the division going into the match. In the match against Preston, striker Carl Asaba, the team's top goalscorer in the previous season, made his first Football League appearance for nine months following a lengthy absence due to a hernia which required three operations. In March, Gillingham inflicted Bristol City's first home league defeat of the season. Gillingham lost consecutive away games against Colchester United and Wycombe Wanderers over the Easter weekend, but then beat Chesterfield 1–0, beginning an eight-game unbeaten run. This run included victories within four days over two of the other teams chasing promotion, Wigan Athletic and Burnley; following the latter win, Stephen Wood of The Times noted that Gillingham were "entering their best form at the perfect moment".

In the penultimate game of the season, Asaba scored Gillingham's third hat-trick of the season as the team beat Cardiff City 4–1. The result left Gillingham second in the table going into the final game, ahead of Burnley on goal difference; Gillingham would finish in that position and gain automatic promotion to the First Division if their result away to Wrexham matched or bettered that achieved by Burnley away to Scunthorpe United. Gillingham, however, lost 1–0, while Burnley won and thus moved above Gillingham into second place. Finishing third meant that Gillingham entered the play-offs for the final promotion place along with the three teams that finished below them. After the match, manager Taylor told the press "We are a bit sore, but we will be fine. It's up to me to earn my money and lift them. But I've got no doubts; I've always said that the spirit is first-class. Now it's going to be tested".

=== Match details ===
Key

- In result column, Gillingham's score shown first
- H = Home match
- A = Away match
- pen. = Penalty kick
- o.g. = Own goal

Results

Date	Opponents	Result	Goalscorers	Attendance
7 August 1999	Bury (A)	1–2	Thomson	4,014
14 August 1999	Bristol Rovers (H)	0–1		6,234
21 August 1999	Blackpool (A)	1–1	Ashby	4,203
28 August 1999	Wycombe Wanderers (H)	2–2	Taylor (pen.), McGlinchey	6,180
30 August 1999	Stoke City (A)	1–1	Taylor	8,369
4 September 1999	Oldham Athletic (H)	2–1	Taylor, Omoyinmi	5,884
11 September 1999	Oxford United (A)	2–1	Southall (pen.), Omoyinmi	5,418
18 September 1999	Preston North End (H)	0–2		6,610
25 September 1999	Cambridge United (A)	2–2	Taylor, Butters	4,708
2 October 1999	Millwall (H)	2–0	Lewis, Taylor	6,616
9 October 1999	Wrexham (H)	5–1	Thomson, Southall, Taylor (3)	5,997
16 October 1999	Luton Town (A)	1–3	Lewis	6,394
19 October 1999	Brentford (A)	2–1	Omoyinmi, Saunders	6,264
23 October 1999	Cambridge United (H)	2–1	Thomson (2)	6,417
2 November 1999	Bristol City (H)	3–0	Taylor (3)	6,892
6 November 1999	Notts County (A)	1–1	Taylor	6,023
12 November 1999	Bournemouth (H)	4–1	Hessenthaler, Thomson, Taylor	6,336
23 November 1999	Scunthorpe United (A)	4–1	Taylor, Thomson, Lewis, Nosworthy	3,444
27 November 1999	Cardiff City (A)	2–1	Hessenthaler, Thomson	7,608
4 December 1999	Bury (H)	1–0	Edge	7,036
26 December 1999	Colchester United (H)	2–1	Rowe, Southall	7,338
28 December 1999	Wigan Athletic (A)	0–2		8,054
3 January 2000	Reading (H)	2–2	Southall, Thomson	7,453
15 January 2000	Bristol Rovers (A)	1–2	Onuora	8,331
22 January 2000	Blackpool (H)	1–3	Southall	6,805
1 February 2000	Chesterfield (A)	0–0		2,898
5 February 2000	Stoke City (H)	3–0	Onuora, Gooden, Rowe	7,801
12 February 2000	Oldham Athletic (A)	3–1	Gooden, Ashby, Rowe	5,144
26 February 2000	Preston North End (A)	2–0	Asaba (2)	13,246
4 March 2000	Oxford United (H)	1–0	Lewis	6,966
7 March 2000	Notts County (H)	0–1		6,915
11 March 2000	Bristol City (A)	1–0	Hessenthaler	9,332
14 March 2000	Burnley (H)	2–2	Butters, Asaba	7,347
18 March 2000	Scunthorpe United (H)	3–1	Lewis, Thomson, Southall (pen.)	6,822
21 March 2000	Bournemouth (A)	1–0	Onuora	4,443
25 March 2000	Colchester United (A)	1–2	Rowe	4,337
28 March 2000	Wycombe Wanderers (A)	0–1		4,183
1 April 2000	Chesterfield (H)	1–0	Butler	6,772
7 April 2000	Reading (A)	2–2	Southall, Onuora	11,064
15 April 2000	Wigan Athletic (H)	2–1	Onuora, Lewis	7,746
18 April 2000	Burnley (A)	3–0	Gooden, Ashby, Smith	17,026
22 April 2000	Luton Town (H)	2–0	Hessenthaler, Southall	8,667
24 April 2000	Millwall (A)	2–2	Gooden, Hessenthaler	17,929
29 April 2000	Brentford (H)	2–0	Onuora, Butler	9,001
2 May 2000	Cardiff City (H)	4–1	Asaba (3), Southall	9,178
6 May 2000	Wrexham (A)	0–1		8,811

=== Partial league table ===
Football League Second Division final table, leading positions
Pos	Team	Pld	W	D	L	GF	GA	GD	Pts	Promotion or relegation
1	Preston North End	46	28	11	7	74	37	+37	95	Division Champions, promoted
2	Burnley	46	25	13	8	69	47	+22	88	Promoted
3	Gillingham	46	25	10	11	79	48	+31	85	Participated in play-offs
4	Wigan Athletic	46	22	17	7	72	38	+34	83	Participated in play-offs
5	Millwall	46	23	13	10	76	50	+26	82	Participated in play-offs
6	Stoke City	46	23	13	10	68	42	+26	82	Participated in play-offs

=== Play-offs ===
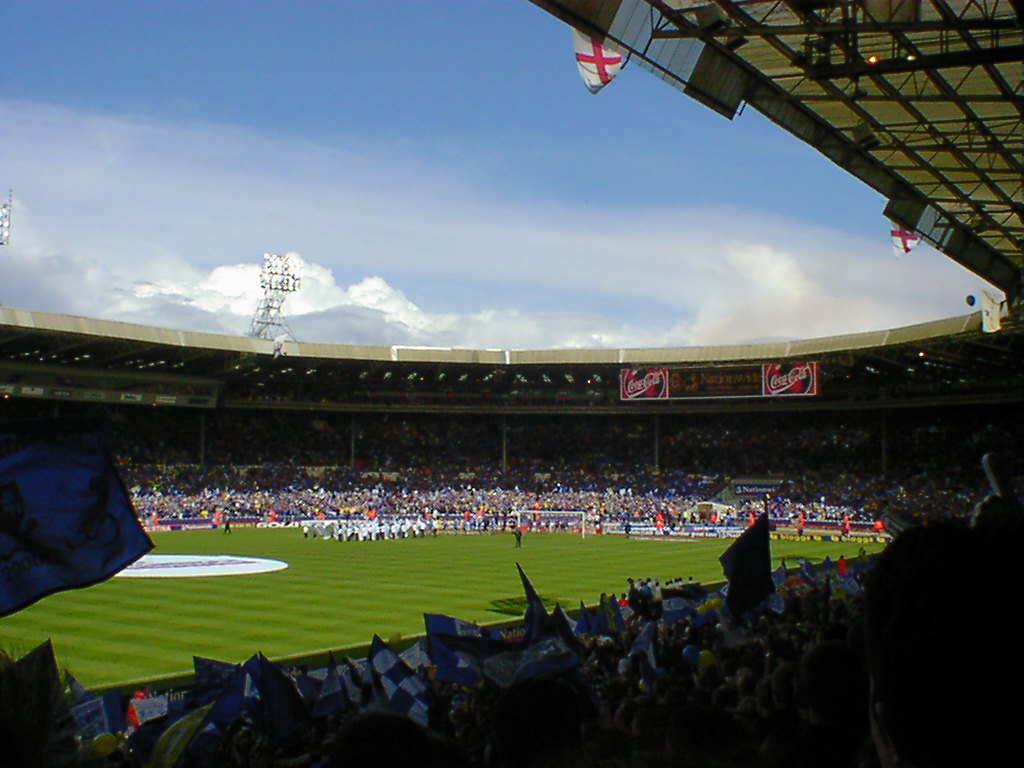
Gillingham fans waving banners in the build-up to the play-off final at Wembley Stadium

In the play-off semi-finals, Gillingham played sixth-place finishers Stoke City. In the first match of the two-legged tie, Stoke scored two goals in the first eight minutes. Although Gooden scored after 18 minutes, Stoke extended their lead to 3–1 in the second half. In the fifth minute of injury time, Hessenthaler scored to make the final score 3–2. Before half-time of the second leg, Stoke's Clive Clarke was sent off. Graham Kavanagh was also dismissed early in the second half, leaving Stoke with just nine players, after which Barry Ashby scored a goal for Gillingham to bring the aggregate score level at 3–3. In extra time, Onuora and Paul Smith scored further goals for Gillingham, who thus secured victory by a final aggregate score of 5–3. The crowd of 10,386 was the season's largest attendance at Priestfield.

Gillingham played Wigan Athletic in the final at Wembley Stadium. Gillingham took the lead in the first half when Wigan defender Pat McGibbon scored an own goal under pressure from Onuora. Wigan equalised shortly after half-time, and believed they had taken the lead when Southall blocked a shot from Wigan's Arjan de Zeeuw on the goal-line; the Wigan players believed that the ball had in fact crossed the line, but the referee ruled otherwise. With no further goals being scored by either team, the match went into extra time, during which Wigan took a 2–1 lead when Stuart Barlow scored a penalty kick. Gillingham scored two goals in the last six minutes through Butler and Thomson, both of whom had come on as substitutes, to win 3–2. Gillingham thus gained promotion to the second tier of English football for the first time in the club's 107-year history.

=== Match details ===
Key

- In result column, Gillingham's score shown first
- H = Home match
- A = Away match
- N = Match played at a neutral venue
- pen. = Penalty kick
- o.g. = Own goal

Results

Date	Round	Opponents	Result	Goalscorers	Attendance
13 May 2000	Semi-final (first leg)	Stoke City (A)	2–3	Gooden, Hessenthaler	22,124
17 May 2000	Semi-final (second leg)	Stoke City (H)	3–0 (a.e.t.)	Ashby, Onuora, Smith	10,386
28 May 2000	Final	Wigan Athletic (N)	3–2 (a.e.t.)	McGibbon (o.g.), Butler, Thomson	53,764

== Cup matches ==
=== FA Cup ===
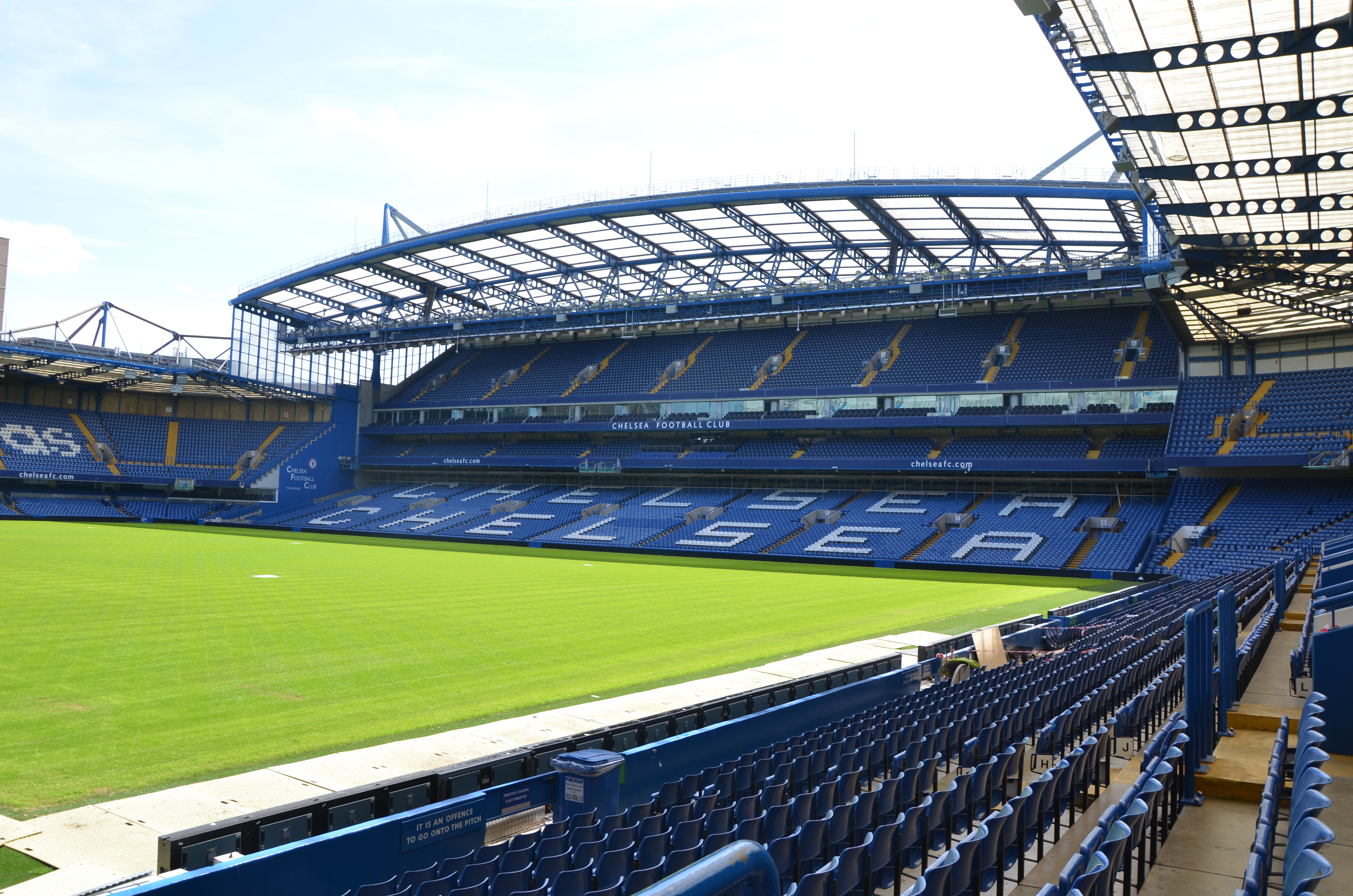
Gillingham were eliminated from the FA Cup at Stamford Bridge, home of Chelsea.

As a Second Division team, Gillingham entered the 1999–2000 FA Cup in the first round and were drawn to play away to Cheltenham Town, newly-promoted into the Football League Third Division from the Football Conference. The match at Cheltenham's Whaddon Road ground ended 1–1, necessitating a replay at Priestfield, which Gillingham won 3–2. In the second round, Gillingham played Darlington of the Third Division and won 3–1. Darlington were reinstated into the competition, however, when they were randomly selected from all the teams defeated in the second round to fill the vacant slot in the third round left by Manchester United's decision to withdraw from the FA Cup to take part in the 2000 FIFA Club World Championship. In the third round, Gillingham played away to Walsall of the First Division and held them to a 1–1 draw. The replay also finished 1–1, but unlike in the initial match the rules of the competition meant that extra time was played and Gillingham scored again to win 2–1.

Gillingham's opponents in the fourth round were Bradford City of the Premier League. Gillingham took a two-goal lead and, although Bradford scored in the last 15 minutes, Gillingham scored a third moments later and defeated their higher-level opponents 3–1 to reach the last 16 of the FA Cup for only the second time in the club's history. It was also the first time that Gillingham had defeated a team from the highest division of English football in the FA Cup since 1908. In the fifth round, Gillingham played another Premier League team, Sheffield Wednesday. Wednesday scored in the first half and with 20 minutes of the match left, the score remained 1–0. Mark Saunders scored an equalising goal in the 70th minute and two minutes later Thomson scored to give Gillingham the lead. Southall added a third goal in the last 10 minutes and Gillingham won 3–1 to reach the quarter-finals of the FA Cup for the first time. For the third consecutive round, Gillingham faced Premier League opposition, this time Chelsea. Although Gillingham restricted their opponents to a single goal in the first half, the Premier League team scored a further four after the interval to make the final score 5–0.

==== Match results ====
Key

- In result column, Gillingham's score shown first
- H = Home match
- A = Away match
- pen. = Penalty kick
- o.g. = Own goal

Results

Date	Round	Opponents	Result	Goalscorers	Attendance
30 October 1999	First	Cheltenham Town (A)	1–1	Southall	3,188
9 November 1999	First (replay)	Cheltenham Town (H)	3–2	Thomson, Pennock, McGlinchey	4,352
20 November 1999	Second	Darlington (H)	3–1	Butters, Taylor (2)	5,168
11 December 1999	Third	Walsall (A)	1–1	Southall	4,314
8 January 2000	Third (replay)	Walsall (H)	2–1 (a.e.t.)	Barras (o.g.), Thomson	6,538
11 January 2000	Fourth	Bradford City (H)	3–1	Thomson, Ashby, Hodge	7,091
29 January 2000	Fifth	Sheffield Wednesday (H)	3–1	Saunders, Thomson, Southall	10,130
20 February 2000	Sixth / quarter-final	Chelsea (A)	0–5		34,205

=== Football League Cup ===
As a Second Division team, Gillingham entered the 1999–2000 Football League Cup in the first round and were drawn to play Brighton & Hove Albion of the Third Division. The first leg of the two-legged tie took place at the Withdean Stadium, Brighton's new home after a period spent sharing Priestfield Stadium, and resulted in a 2–0 win for Gillingham. The score was the same in the second leg, so Gillingham progressed to the second round with a 4–0 win on aggregate. In the next round Gillingham were paired with Bolton Wanderers of the First Division. The first leg at Priestfield ended in a 4–1 victory for the visitors and Bolton won the second leg 2–0 to secure a 6–1 aggregate victory and eliminate Gillingham from the competition.

Gillingham's participation in the League Cup had repercussions months after the team were eliminated from the competition. Omoyinmi, who was on loan from West Ham United, played in both matches against Bolton. When his loan ended, he returned to West Ham and played briefly as a substitute in their League Cup quarter-final victory over Aston Villa in December. As he had already played for a different team earlier in the competition, however, he was cup-tied and therefore not eligible to play for West Ham. Due to the presence on the pitch of an ineligible player, the teams were ordered to replay the match and West Ham lost the second game and were eliminated from the competition.

==== Match results ====
Key

- In result column, Gillingham's score shown first
- H = Home match
- A = Away match
- pen. = Penalty kick
- o.g. = Own goal

Results

Date	Round	Opponents	Result	Goalscorers	Attendance
11 August 1999	First (first leg)	Brighton & Hove Albion (A)	2–0	Ormerod (o.g.), Hessenthaler	5,613
24 August 1999	First (second leg)	Brighton & Hove Albion (H)	2–0	Taylor, Southall	4,592
14 September 1999	Second (first leg)	Bolton Wanderers (H)	1–4	Hessenthaler	4,996
21 September 1999	Second (second leg)	Bolton Wanderers (A)	0–2		3,673

=== Football League Trophy ===
In the first round of the 1999–2000 Football League Trophy, a competition for Second and Third Division teams, Gillingham played Torquay United of the Third Division. With several regular players rested, Gillingham were defeated 3–0 by their lower-division opponents and were thus eliminated from the competition at the earliest stage. The attendance of 2,718 was the lowest of the season at Priestfield.

==== Match results ====
Key

- In result column, Gillingham's score shown first
- H = Home match
- A = Away match
- pen. = Penalty kick
- o.g. = Own goal

Results

Date	Round	Opponents	Result	Goalscorers	Attendance
7 December 1999	First (southern section)	Torquay United (H)	0–3		2,718

== Players ==
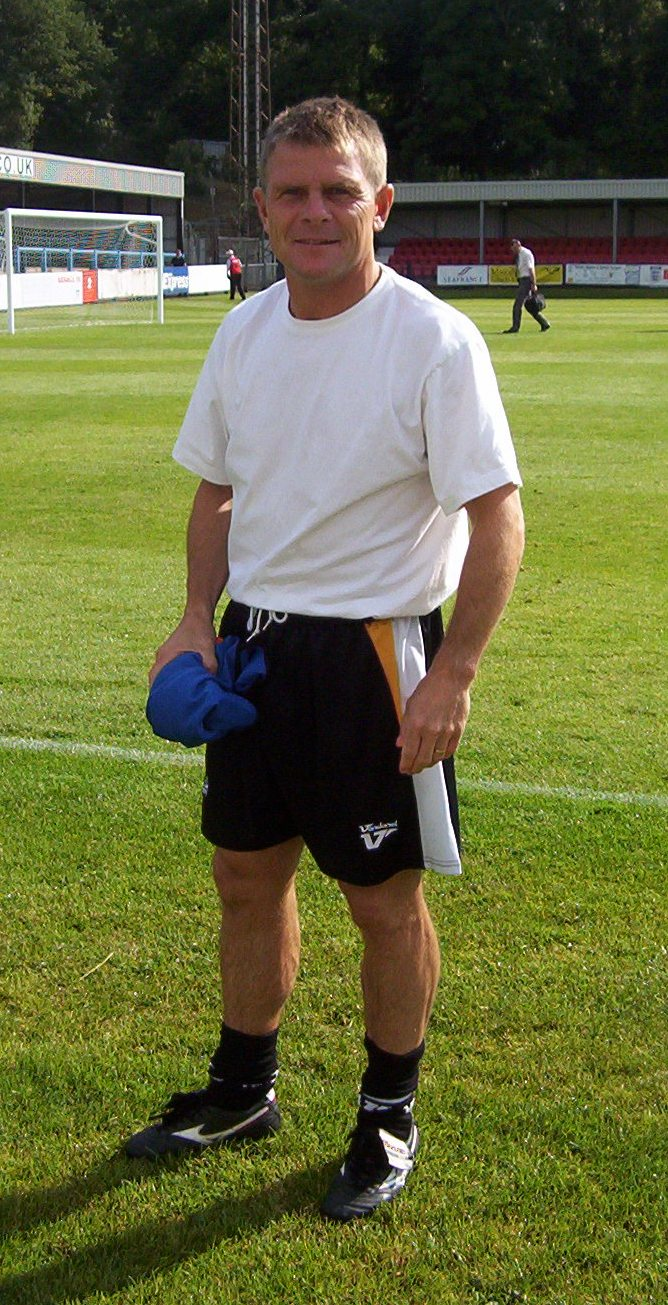
Andy Hessenthaler (pictured in 2009) made 57 appearances during the season.

Southall made the most appearances for Gillingham during the season, playing in 59 of the team's 62 matches; he missed only one Second Division game, one FA Cup game, and one League Cup game. Six other players made over 50 appearances: Paul Smith played 58 times, Hessenthaler and Ashby 57 times each, Bartram 56 times, Lewis 55 times, and Butters 54 times. Two players, both goalkeepers, played only one game during the season. Charlie Mitten played in goal in the team's one match in the League Trophy, and Steve Mautone played in one league match when Bartram was unable to make it to the ground in time due to a traffic accident. In both cases it was the only appearance the player ever made for Gillingham.

Even though he left before the mid-point of the season, Taylor was the team's leading goalscorer, with 18 goals in 19 games before his move to Manchester City; his total was made up of 15 goals in the Second Division, 2 in the FA Cup and 1 in the League Cup. His two hat-tricks, scored within a little over three weeks of each other, made him only the 13th player in 68 seasons to score multiple Football League hat-tricks for Gillingham. Thomson scored 14 times across all competitions, and Southall was the only other player to reach double figures, with 13 goals.

Player statistics
No.	Player	Position	Second Division		Play-offs		FA Cup		League Cup		League Trophy		Total	
No.	Player	Position	Apps	Goals	Apps	Goals	Apps	Goals	Apps	Goals	Apps	Goals	Apps	Goals
1	Vince Bartram	GK	43	0	3	0	8	0	2	0	0	0	56	0
2	Mark Patterson	DF	9	0	0	0	0	0	1	0	0	0	10	0
3	Roland Edge	DF	26	1	3	0	8	0	0	0	0	0	37	1
4	Paul Smith	MF	44	1	3	1	7	0	3	0	1	0	58	2
5	Barry Ashby	DF	41	3	3	1	8	1	4	0	1	0	57	5
6	Guy Butters	DF	40	2	3	0	8	1	2	0	1	0	54	3
7	Nicky Southall	MF	45	9	3	0	7	3	3	1	1	0	59	13
8	Andy Hessenthaler	MF	42	4	3	2	7	0	4	2	1	0	57	8
9	Carl Asaba	FW	11	6	2	0	1	0	0	0	0	0	14	6
10	James Pinnock	MF	2	0	0	0	0	0	1	0	1	0	4	0
11^{[a]}	Robert Taylor	FW	15	15	0	0	2	2	2	1	0	0	19	18
11^{[a]}	Ty Gooden	MF	16	4	3	1	0	0	0	0	0	0	19	5
12	Nyron Nosworthy	DF	29	1	1	0	8	0	3	0	1	0	42	1
14	Marcus Browning	MF	1	0	1	0	2	0	0	0	0	0	4	0
15	Mark Saunders	MF	26	1	0	0	7	1	3	0	1	0	37	2
16	John Hodge	MF	15	0	0	0	4	1	3	0	0	0	22	1
17	Adrian Pennock	DF	34	0	3	0	6	1	4	0	1	0	48	1
19	Mick Galloway	MF	2	0	0	0	0	0	1	0	0	0	3	0
20	Matt Bryant	DF	6	0	0	0	1	0	1	0	0	0	8	0
21	Charlie Mitten	GK	0	0	0	0	0	0	0	0	1	0	1	0
22	Christian Lee	FW	3	0	0	0	0	0	2	0	0	0	5	0
23	Barry Miller	DF	4	0	0	0	0	0	3	0	0	0	7	0
24	Junior Lewis	MF	42	6	3	0	7	0	2	0	1	0	55	6
25	Brian McGlinchey	DF	13	0	0	0	4	1	4	0	1	0	22	2
26	Steve Butler	FW	10	2	2	1	3	0	0	0	1	0	16	3
27	Andy Thomson	FW	28	9	1	1	5	4	3	0	0	0	37	14
28	Rodney Rowe	FW	22	4	0	0	0	0	0	0	1	0	23	4
29	Iffy Onuora	FW	22	6	3	1	0	0	0	0	0	0	25	7
35	Jon Bass	DF	7	0	0	0	0	0	0	0	0	0	7	0
36	Lee Matthews	FW	5	0	0	0	0	0	0	0	0	0	5	0
38^{[a]}	Emmanuel Omoyinmi	FW	9	3	0	0	0	0	2	0	0	0	11	3
38^{[a]}	Steve Mautone	GK	1	0	0	0	0	0	0	0	0	0	1	0
39	Anthony Williams	GK	2	0	0	0	0	0	2	0	0	0	4	0

FW = Forward, MF = Midfielder, GK = Goalkeeper, DF = Defender

a. Gooden joined the club after Taylor left and was allocated the squad number which Taylor had previously worn. Mautone joined the club after Omoyinmi left and was allocated the squad number which Omoyinmi had previously worn.

== Aftermath ==
Following the play-off final, the Gillingham players and officials celebrated promotion with an open-top bus parade around the town of Gillingham. The club offered a new contract to Taylor to remain as manager for Gillingham's first season in the First Division, but he rejected it and left to take over as manager of Premier League team Leicester City. In his place, the club appointed Hessenthaler to a player-manager position, the first managerial appointment of his career. Gillingham secured a mid-table finish in the club's first season in the second tier of English football, ending the season in 13th position in the 24-team division. The team spent five seasons in the second tier, renamed the Football League Championship in 2004, before being relegated at the end of the 2004–05 season.
