= Barry Miller =

Barry Miller may refer to:

- Barry Miller (actor) (born 1958), American actor
- Barry Miller (politician) (1864–1933), Texas state legislator and lieutenant governor, 1925–1931
- Barry Miller (footballer) (born 1976), retired English football defender
