= John Benson (footballer, born 1942) =

Scottish footballer & manager (1942–2010)

Personal information
- Full name: John Harvey Benson
- Date of birth: 23 December 1942
- Place of birth: Arbroath, Scotland
- Date of death: 30 October 2010 (aged 67)
- Place of death: Macclesfield, Cheshire, England
- Position: Right back

Youth career
- 1958–1961: Manchester City

Senior career*
Years	Team	Apps	(Gls)
1961–1964	Manchester City	44	(0)
1964–1970	Torquay United	240	(7)
1970–1973	AFC Bournemouth	93	(0)
1973	→ Exeter City (loan)	4	(0)
1973–1975	Norwich City	30	(1)
1975–1978	AFC Bournemouth	57	(0)
Total		468	(8)

Managerial career
- 1975–1978: AFC Bournemouth (player-manager)
- 1983: Manchester City
- 1984–1985: Burnley
- 1999–2000: Al-Nasr
- 1999–2000: Wigan Athletic
- * Club domestic league appearances and goals

John Harvey Benson (23 December 1942 – 30 October 2010) was a Scottish football player and manager. Born in Arbroath, Benson started his career as an apprentice at Manchester City. He turned professional in 1961, and made 44 league appearances over the next three seasons before being sold to Fourth Division side Torquay United in 1964. He was a regular in the first team during his whole spell with Torquay, helping the club win promotion to the Third Division in the 1965–66 season.

In 1970, Benson joined John Bond's Fourth Division side Bournemouth & Boscombe Athletic, where he was part of another promotion winning side in the 1970–71 season. He had a short spell on loan with Exeter City in 1973, and later that year moved to Norwich City, who had recently appointed John Bond as their new manager. He spent just over a year at the club before returning to Bournemouth in January 1975 as player-manager, but couldn't prevent the club's relegation to the Fourth Division at the end of the season. In his first full season in charge, the club came close to regaining promotion to the Third Division, but two less successful seasons followed, and Benson resigned in 1978.

Over the next three decades, Benson worked in a wide variety of different coaching and scouting roles. He was appointed as caretaker manager of Manchester City in 1983, but was replaced at the end of the season after the club were relegated. He became manager at Burnley a year later, but was sacked after suffering another relegation. He was also in charge of Wigan Athletic during the 1999–2000 season, narrowly missing out on promotion after the team were defeated in the 2000 Second Division play-off final. He died in October 2010, aged 67, following a short illness.

== Playing career ==
Benson was born on 23 December 1942 in Arbroath, Scotland. He grew up in Manchester after moving there at an early age, and began his career in football with Stockport Boys before signing as an apprentice with Manchester City. He turned professional with the Maine Road side in July 1961 and made his debut against West Bromwich Albion in 1962. Benson made 44 league appearances for the club before being signed by Torquay United in June 1964 for a club record fee of £6,000. He established himself as a regular in the Torquay side and was a member of the 1965–66 promotion side, Torquay finishing third in Division Four.

After 240 league games and 7 goals, Benson moved to Bournemouth & Boscombe Athletic in October 1970 for a fee of £12,000, and was appointed captain by manager John Bond. He played four games on loan with Exeter City in March 1973, before moving to Norwich City in December 1973 where he made 37 appearances scoring a solitary league goal. He returned to Bournemouth in January 1975 to become player-manager and made another 57 league appearances. He failed to save the Cherries from relegation at the end of his first season, and led them to sixth place the following year. However, this was the nearest the Cherries would get to winning back their Division Three status under Benson as they finished 13th and 17th the following years. The 1978–79 season looked to be going the same way and he was replaced at Dean Court by Alec Stock.

== Post-playing career ==
In January 1979, Benson returned to Norwich City to act as youth team coach and scout, working under his former colleague from Bournemouth and Torquay, John Bond. In October 1980 he turned down the manager's job at Carrow Road (which was offered to him as Norwich had expected Ken Brown, their assistant manager, to have a similar position at Manchester City,) to follow Bond to Manchester City as his assistant. Norwich then offered their manager's job to Ken Brown who did accept. Benson briefly took over as manager at Manchester City after Bond's dismissal on 9 February 1983. At the end of the season, with City relegated after a home defeat by Luton Town (which resulted in Luton manager David Pleat dancing on the pitch), Benson was replaced by Billy McNeill. He rejoined John Bond as coach to Bond's Burnley team, and again replaced Bond as manager in August 1984. His spell in charge at Turf Moor lasted until May 1985, when he was sacked after Burnley's relegation.

He subsequently took coaching jobs in Dubai and with Al Naser in Kuwait. In 1990, he was appointed Chief Scout at Barnsley, a post he held until April 1994 when he returned to Norwich City assisting then manager John Deehan with administrative duties, whilst also coaching the Norwich goalkeepers. Deehan resigned in April 1995, and was replaced by Martin O'Neill, Deehan subsequently being appointed manager of Wigan Athletic. In November 1995, Benson became Deehan's assistant at Wigan. In the summer of 1998, Deehan left to coach at Sheffield United, with Benson taking over as caretaker. He was offered the job, but declined on the grounds of ill-health, Ray Mathias taking over instead, with Benson remaining in an advisory capacity. With expectations high and Wigan missing out on promotion, Matthias was sacked, and on 1 June 1999 Benson was appointed as Wigan's manager. As Wigan settled into their new home at the JJB Stadium, Benson's side went 26 league games undefeated, before losing at home to Oldham Athletic on 7 January 2000, Benson picking up 2 Manager of the Month awards in the process. Towards the end of the season Wigan lost their form and found themselves in the play-off final at Wembley against Gillingham. A few days prior to the game, Benson had announced he was stepping down but remained to lead his team out at Wembley and ultimately a 3–2 defeat after being 2–1 up with only 7 minutes of extra time remaining. In June 2000 Bruce Rioch took over as Wigan manager, with Benson appointed as general manager. In April 2001, Rioch was replaced by Steve Bruce and Benson's role changed to that of youth development officer. A month later Bruce also left, and the consequent arrival as Paul Jewell resulted in Benson being given the title of Director of Football. On 10 December 2001 he resigned from his post at Wigan to link up again, this time as assistant manager, with Steve Bruce, when Bruce finally completed his acrimonious move from Crystal Palace to Birmingham City. He later became general manager at Birmingham, but left on 2 June 2006 to rejoin Wigan Athletic, where his role was described as "a link between the playing and administrative sides" of the club. He left Wigan to join Sunderland in the summer of 2010.

=== Managerial statistics ===
As of 27 April 2014

Team	From	To	Record				
Team	From	To	G	W	D	L	Win %
AFC Bournemouth	23 January 1975	1 January 1978	156	50	54	52	32.05
Manchester City	3 February 1983	7 June 1983	17	3	2	12	17.65
Burnley	August 1984	May 1985	57	16	15	26	28.07
Wigan Athletic	21 May 1999	26 June 2000	59	29	19	11	49.15
Total			285	96	88	101	33.68

== Death ==
On 30 October 2010, it was announced that Benson had died, aged 67, following a short illness.

On 10 November 2010, Wigan vs Liverpool Premier League match, there was a well-respected minute's applause in his memory.
