= 2000 Football League Second Division play-off final =

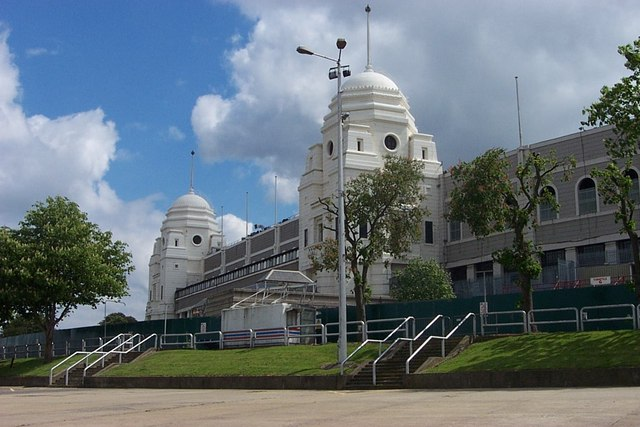
- The final took place at Wembley Stadium.
Wigan Athletic	Gillingham
2	3
- After extra time
- Date: 28 May 2000
- Venue: Wembley Stadium, London
- Referee: Rob Styles (Hampshire)
- Attendance: 53,764

The 2000 Football League Second Division play-off final was an association football match played at Wembley Stadium on 28 May 2000, to determine the third and final team to gain promotion from the Second Division to the First Division of the Football League in the 1999–2000 season. Gillingham faced Wigan Athletic in one of the last competitive games to be played at the original Wembley Stadium. It was Gillingham's second consecutive appearance in the Second Division play-off final after a defeat to Manchester City a year earlier. Wigan had been defeated in the semi-finals the previous season and the game marked their first appearance in a play-off final. The teams reached the 2000 final by defeating Stoke City and Millwall respectively in the semi-finals.

The final drew a crowd of 53,764 and was refereed by Rob Styles. Gillingham took the lead in the first half when Wigan defender Pat McGibbon scored an own goal under pressure from Iffy Onuora. Wigan equalised shortly after half-time, and believed they had taken the lead when Gillingham's Nicky Southall blocked a shot from Wigan's Arjan de Zeeuw; Southall appeared to be standing behind the goal line, which would have meant that the ball had entered the goal, but the assistant referee ruled otherwise. The score after the regulation 90 minutes was 1–1 so the match went into extra time. During the extra period Wigan took a 2–1 lead when Stuart Barlow scored a penalty kick, but Gillingham scored two goals in the last six minutes through Steve Butler and Andy Thomson, both of whom had come on as substitutes, to win 3–2. Gillingham thus gained promotion to the second tier of English football for the first time in the club's 107-year history.

Both teams' managers left their respective jobs after the match. Wigan's John Benson had always intended to step down at the end of the season; Gillingham hoped to retain the services of Peter Taylor but he chose to leave and take the manager's job at Leicester City. Gillingham spent five years at the higher level before being relegated back to the third tier. After losing in the play-offs again in 2001, Wigan finally gained promotion to the First Division in 2003.

== Route to the final ==
Football League Second Division final table, leading positions
Pos	Team	Pld	W	D	L	GF	GA	GD	Pts
1	Preston North End	46	28	11	7	74	37	+37	95
2	Burnley	46	25	13	8	69	47	+22	88
3	Gillingham	46	25	10	11	79	48	+31	85
4	Wigan Athletic	46	22	17	7	72	38	+34	83
5	Millwall	46	23	13	10	76	50	+26	82
6	Stoke City	46	23	13	10	68	42	+26	82

In the 1999–2000 Football League season, the teams that finished in the top two positions in the Second Division, the third tier of the English football league system, gained automatic promotion to the First Division. The teams that finished between third and sixth inclusive competed in the play-offs for the third and final promotion place. Gillingham (nicknamed the "Gills") finished the season in third place, one position ahead of Wigan Athletic. On the final day of the league season, Gillingham had the opportunity to finish in second place in the table and thereby clinch an automatic promotion place, but a 1–0 defeat away to Wrexham meant that Burnley were able to overtake them with a 2–1 win over Scunthorpe United. Wigan had looked on course for an automatic promotion place in the first half of the season, being undefeated after 23 games. The team struggled from January onwards, however, including a run of eight league games without a win, and finished five points outside the top two.

In the play-off semi-finals, Wigan were paired with fifth-placed Millwall and Gillingham with sixth-place finishers Stoke City. Each semi-final was played on a two-legged basis, with one game at each team's home stadium and the result determined based on the aggregate score of the two games. In the first leg of their semi-final away to Stoke, Gillingham conceded two goals in the first eight minutes of the game. Although Ty Gooden scored for the "Gills" after 18 minutes, Stoke extended their lead to 3–1 in the second half. In the fifth minute of stoppage time, Andy Hessenthaler scored a goal for Gillingham, making the final score 3–2. Wigan drew 0–0 in the first leg against Millwall, with BBC Sport noting that both teams appeared "edgy from the outset and perhaps too anxious to impress". After the first legs, the BBC still regarded the outcome of both semi-finals as difficult to predict.

Four days after the first leg matches took place, Wigan defeated Millwall 1–0 in the second leg to win the semi-final by the same score on aggregate and clinch a place at Wembley; midfielder Darren Sheridan scored the only goal of the game in the second half. Reserve goalkeeper Derek Stillie played in place of Roy Carroll, who had recently undergone an appendix operation, and was praised for his tenacious performance. Gillingham's second leg match was an emotionally-charged game, and before half-time Stoke's Clive Clarke was sent off, reducing his team to ten men. Early in the second half, Graham Kavanagh was also dismissed, leaving Stoke with just nine players. Barry Ashby scored a goal for Gillingham to bring the aggregate score level at 3–3, and with the scores level at the end of 90 minutes, extra time was required. During the additional 30 minutes, Iffy Onuora and Paul Smith scored further goals for Gillingham, who thus secured victory by a final aggregate score of 5–3. Stoke manager Gudjon Thordarson was critical of the performance of referee Rob Styles, saying "The almighty God was looking elsewhere. Even He can't put consistency into the referees."

Wigan Athletic				Gillingham
Opponent	Result	Legs	Round	Opponent	Result	Legs
Millwall	1–0	0–0 away; 1–0 home	Semi-finals	Stoke City	5–3	2–3 away; 3–0 home

== Background ==
Gillingham were appearing in the play-off final for a second consecutive season. In the 1998–99 season, the "Gills" had qualified for the final but had been defeated by Manchester City. Wigan had competed in the previous season's play-offs but lost to Manchester City at the semi-final stage; the club had never reached a play-off final, but had played at Wembley on three previous occasions, most recently in the 1999 Football League Trophy Final. Neither Gillingham nor Wigan had competed higher than the third tier of English football in their history, so whichever team emerged victorious would reach the second level for the first time. The teams had met twice during the regular season, each team winning at their home stadium; Wigan won 2–0 at the JJB Stadium in December and Gillingham won 2–1 at Priestfield Stadium in April. On the morning of the match, The Observer listed the odds on both teams as equal, at 5–6.

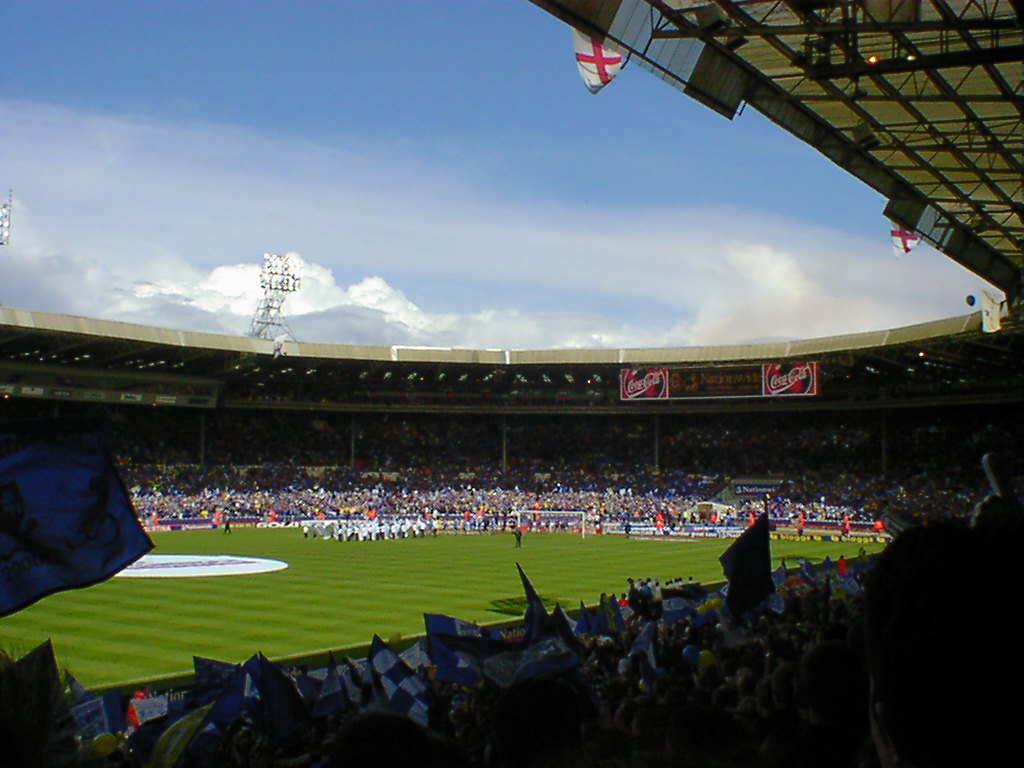
Gillingham fans waving banners before the match

The match drew an attendance of 53,764, much lower than the figure of 76,935 recorded at the previous season's Second Division play-off final, and there was a significant disparity in the number of tickets sold to the fans of the two clubs, with only around 10,000 Wigan fans in attendance compared to over 40,000 Gillingham fans. Rob Styles was chosen to referee the match; although he had been criticised by the defeated manager after the semi-final match between Gillingham and Stoke City, his performance was rated highly by the league's official assessor of referees, and his appointment to take charge of the final was seen as a reward for his handling of the earlier game. The match was broadcast live in the United Kingdom on the Sky Sports 2 television channel with commentary provided by Rob Hawthorne and Alan Brazil. As both teams usually wore predominantly blue kits, a coin was tossed to determine which would have to wear their second-choice colours; Wigan won the toss, meaning that Gillingham wore their second-choice kit of all-yellow. The guest of honour was Philip Williamson, retail operations director of the Nationwide Building Society, the principal sponsor of the Football League, who was accompanied by Peter Middleton and David Dent, the League's chairman and secretary respectively. One of the young mascots who accompanied the players as they entered the field of play was Hessenthaler's six-year-old son Jake, who would go on to play professionally for Gillingham himself.

Gillingham manager Peter Taylor picked seven of the players who had started the previous season's play-off final, but made the decision to leave the team's captain, Paul Smith, out of the starting line-up due to personal issues, which led to the player requesting a transfer. Wigan manager John Benson, who was taking charge of the team for the last time before the appointment of a new manager, picked the same eleven players who had started the second leg of the play-off semi-final; the line-up included five players who had played at Wembley in the previous season's Football League Trophy final. There was media speculation that Benson would recall goalkeeper Carroll, by now fully recovered from his operation, but ultimately he opted to again select Stillie, and Carroll was named as one of the substitutes. Stuart Barlow, the club's top goalscorer during the regular season, had recently recovered from an operation on his ankle and it was anticipated that he would be named as a substitute, but he was ultimately named in the starting line-up. Both teams adopted a 5–3–2 formation, consisting of three defenders (three central defenders and two wing-backs), three midfielders and two strikers.

== Match ==
=== First half ===
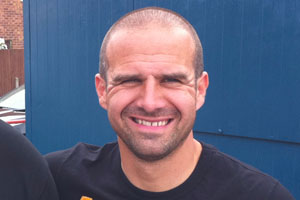
Wigan's Andy Liddell had a goalscoring opportunity in the first half but the ball hit the crossbar.

A hailstorm occurred approximately 90 minutes before the game, but by 3:00 pm the sky was clear, although the pitch remained slick and greasy. After the players were presented to the guest of honour, Gillingham kicked off the match. Wigan were the stronger team in the early part of the game, with Sheridan dominating the midfield play and Andy Liddell causing problems for Gillingham's defenders. Simon Haworth of Wigan had the first goalscoring opportunity after less than four minutes with a header, but Gillingham goalkeeper Vince Bartram made a comfortable save. Carl Asaba had a shot which went well wide of the goal after 10 minutes, but as the 15-minute mark approached, the ball had been in the third of the pitch closest to Gillingham's goalkeeper for almost twice as much time as in the third closest to Wigan's goalkeeper.

In the 16th minute, Gillingham were awarded a free kick close to the Wigan penalty area, and as Gooden's kick came in, goalkeeper Stillie almost collided with his team-mate Haworth as he attempted to punch the ball away, but although the resultant punch was weak the Gillingham players failed to capitalise on it. Gillingham won another free kick in a similar position seven minutes later when Hessenthaler was fouled by Arjan de Zeeuw, but the kick did not trouble the Wigan goalkeeper. The commentary team noted that Hessenthaler was fortunate not to be penalised by the referee for shoving de Zeeuw in response to the foul. Shortly afterwards, Liddell hit a goalbound shot for Wigan which Bartram initially fumbled, but the Gillingham goalkeeper was able to gather the ball at the second attempt. Moments later, Liddell hit the crossbar with a long-range shot on goal. Gillingham had the next attempt on goal but Hessenthaler's shot was directed straight at Stillie.

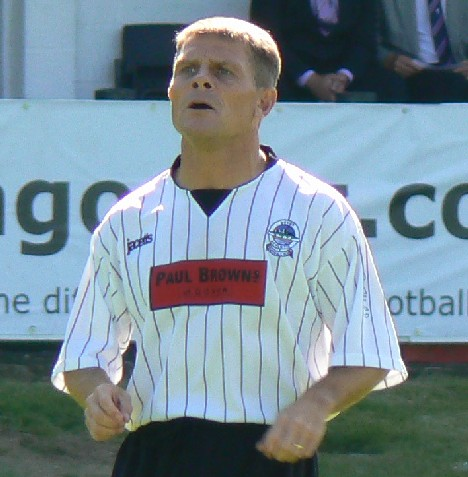
Gillingham's Andy Hessenthaler was involved in the build-up to the first goal.

Gillingham scored the first goal of the match after 35 minutes when Hessenthaler passed the ball to Asaba, whose shot was deflected by Wigan defender Pat McGibbon into his own goal, under pressure from Onuora. Wigan's de Zeeuw attempted to keep the ball out of the goal, but after checking with his assistant referee, referee Styles ruled that the ball had crossed the line, giving Gillingham a 1–0 lead. Shortly afterwards, Wigan were awarded a free kick just outside Gillingham's penalty area, but Neil Redfearn's kick went over the crossbar. In the final minute of the first half, Gillingham received a free kick approximately 35 yards (32 m) from the Wigan goal, but Nicky Southall's kick came to nothing. There were no further goalscoring opportunities and at half-time the score remained 1–0 to Gillingham. Former Gillingham manager Tony Pulis, working as a pundit on the Sky Sports 2 broadcast, picked out Liddell as Wigan's key player and stated that his team-mates needed to get the ball to him more frequently in the second half.

=== Second half ===
Six minutes into the second half, Gillingham had an opportunity to double their lead when Hessenthaler crossed the ball from a position on the right of the pitch and Onoura outjumped a Wigan defender, but his header went slightly to the left of the goal. Less than two minutes later, Wigan equalised; de Zeeuw crossed the ball from a wide position and Haworth flicked it up with his left foot and then hit a shot with his right from 6 yards (5.5 m) out past Bartram and into the net, to score what Phil Shaw of The Independent described as "one of Wembley's great goals". With the score level once again, the urgency of the game increased. The first substitution of the game occurred at the one-hour mark, as Gillingham brought on Paul Smith in place of defender Roland Edge. Moments later, Gillingham were awarded a free kick when Wigan's McGibbon fouled Asaba. Gillingham's Ashby met Gooden's kick with a header in the penalty area but it went wide of the goal, with the Sky commentary team stating that he "should have done better".

After 63 minutes, Gillingham were awarded the first corner kick of the game, but nothing came of it as Wigan goalkeeper Stillie was able to catch the ball with little difficulty. A minute later, Wigan in turn gained their first corner. From the resultant kick, de Zeeuw connected with a header which was cleared off the goal line by Gillingham's Southall, who appeared to be standing behind the line. The Wigan supporters began to celebrate, believing that the ball had in fact crossed the line and entered the goal, but the assistant referee ruled otherwise, meaning that no goal was awarded and the score remained 1–1. Both teams had opportunities to score in quick succession at the 73-minute mark: Bartram dived full-length to save for Gillingham and moments later Asaba hit a shot which Stillie was able to push round the goalpost. Stillie made another save four minutes later when Hessenthaler hit a long-range shot; at this point Gillingham had recorded eight attempts on goal compared to Wigan's seven.

Wigan manager Benson made his first substitution after 84 minutes, replacing Redfearn with striker Stuart Barlow. Two minutes later, Southall received the ball near the touchline but was fouled by Wigan defender Kevin Sharp. The Wigan player had already received a yellow card from referee Styles for an earlier offence, and so was sent off, reducing his team to ten men. The match remained deadlocked at 1–1 after 90 minutes and went into extra time. In the Sky Sports studio, Pulis predicted that Gillingham would take control of the game during the extra 30 minutes and ultimately win it, and fellow pundit Nigel Spackman was of the opinion that keeping the scores level for the remaining 30 minutes, allowing the game to be settled by a penalty shoot-out, would be a "bonus" for Wigan.

=== Extra time ===
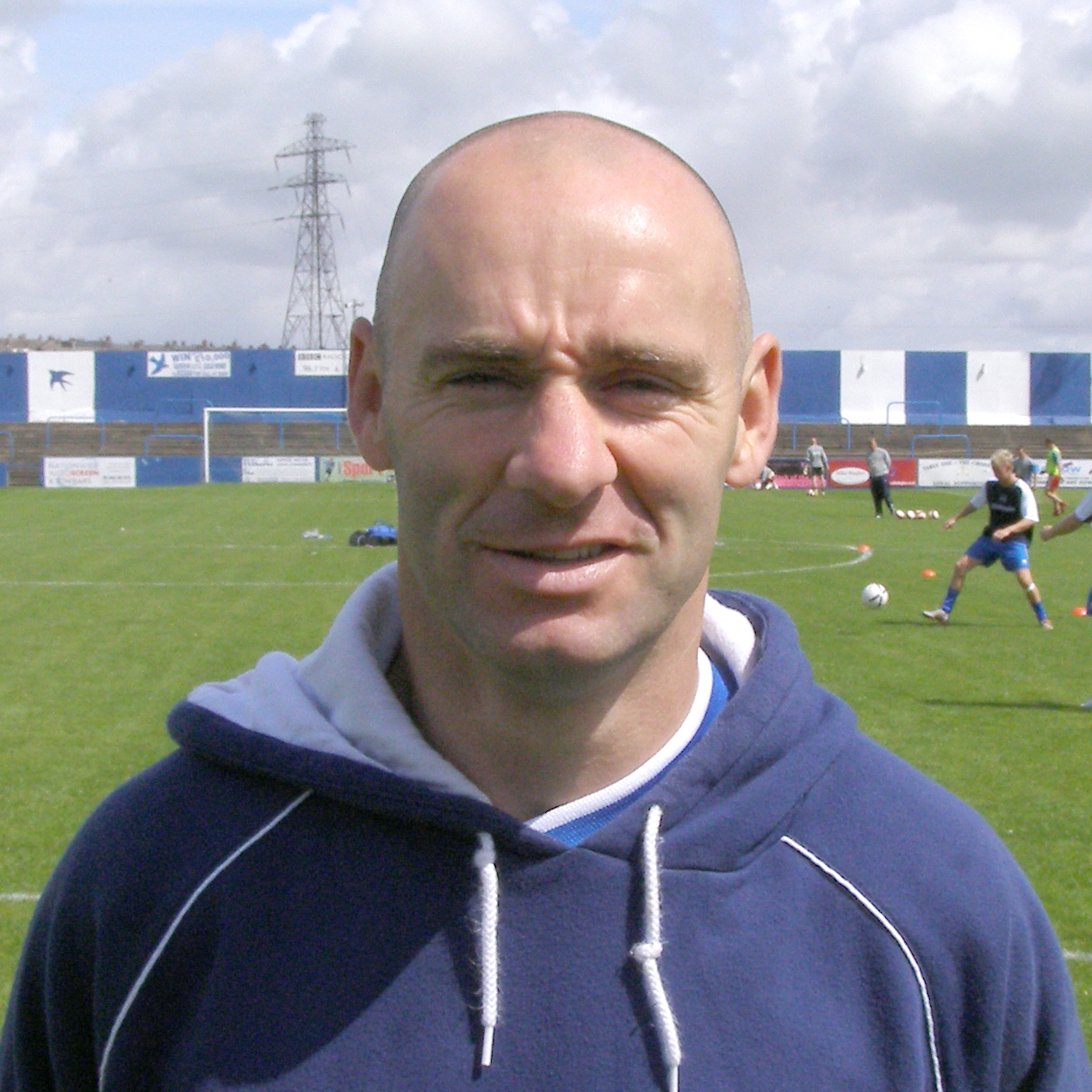
Darren Sheridan of Wigan, who was involved in a pivotal moment in extra time

In the early stages of extra time, Wigan again looked stronger despite their numerical disadvantage. Five minutes into the extra period, Gillingham made a second substitution, bringing on Andy Thomson to replace fellow striker Onuora. Shortly afterwards, as Sheridan received the ball in the Gillingham penalty area, he fell to the ground under pressure from Gillingham's Ashby. Although the commentary team believed that Ashby had only made minimal contact, he was adjudged to have fouled Sheridan and referee Styles awarded a penalty kick to Wigan. Barlow took the kick and scored to give his team a 2–1 lead. Shortly before the end of the first half of extra time, Gillingham manager Taylor made his final substitution, bringing on striker Steve Butler to replace defender Ashby. Butler, a 38-year-old veteran, had played only sporadically during the season, appearing in the starting line-up on just three occasions out of a total of 63 matches. At the same time, Wigan replaced Liddell with former club captain Carl Bradshaw.

Wigan made their final substitution before the second half of extra time began, replacing Haworth with Jeff Peron. Less than three minutes into the second period, Ian Kilford had the chance to extend Wigan's lead, which according to the commentators would have "killed Gillingham off", but his shot went narrowly wide of the goal. Moments later, Butler headed in a cross from Junior Lewis to level the match once again. With approximately six minutes of the match remaining Hessenthaler was brought down by a Wigan defender and Gillingham appealed for a penalty, but the referee did not award one and subsequently cautioned Hessenthaler for arguing with him. In the 118th minute, Lewis passed the ball to Gooden, who crossed the ball from close to the left touchline into the Wigan penalty area, prompting commentator Hawthorne to exclaim "Gooden ... and that is a good 'un!" Thomson beat Stuart Balmer to the ball and headed it past Stillie to give his team the lead with only two minutes remaining. Wigan were unable to score any further goals in the short time remaining, and the match finished 3–2 to Gillingham.

=== Details ===
28 May 2000
15:00 BST

Wigan Athletic	2–3 (a.e.t.)	Gillingham
Haworth 59'; Barlow 99' (pen.)	Report	McGibbon 35' (o.g.); Butler 114'; Thomson 118'

Wembley Stadium, London
Attendance: 53,764
Referee: Rob Styles (Hampshire)

Wigan Athletic	Gillingham

GK	13	Derek Stillie
RWB	14	Scott Green
DF	4	Pat McGibbon	Booked
DF	5	Stuart Balmer (c)	Booked
DF	6	Arjan de Zeeuw
LWB	3	Kevin Sharp	(yellow card) (yellow-red card) 86'
MF	18	Ian Kilford
MF	32	Neil Redfearn		(substituted off) 84'
MF	22	Darren Sheridan
FW	9	Simon Haworth		(substituted off) 106'
FW	7	Andy Liddell		(substituted off) 105'
Substitutes:
GK	1	Roy Carroll
DF	2	Carl Bradshaw		(substituted in) 105'
FW	11	Stuart Barlow		(substituted in) 84'
DF	15	Gareth Griffiths
MF	29	Jeff Peron		(substituted in) 106'
Manager:
John Benson

GK	1	Vince Bartram
RWB	7	Nicky Southall
DF	17	Adrian Pennock (c)
DF	5	Barry Ashby	Booked	(substituted off) 105'
DF	6	Guy Butters	Booked
LWB	3	Roland Edge		(substituted off) 61'
MF	8	Andy Hessenthaler	Booked
MF	24	Junior Lewis
MF	11	Ty Gooden
FW	9	Carl Asaba
FW	29	Iffy Onuora		(substituted off) 95'
Substitutes:
MF	4	Paul Smith		(substituted in) 61'
DF	12	Nyron Nosworthy
FW	26	Steve Butler		(substituted in) 105'
FW	27	Andy Thomson		(substituted in) 95'
GK	38	Steve Mautone
Manager:
Peter Taylor

== Post-match ==
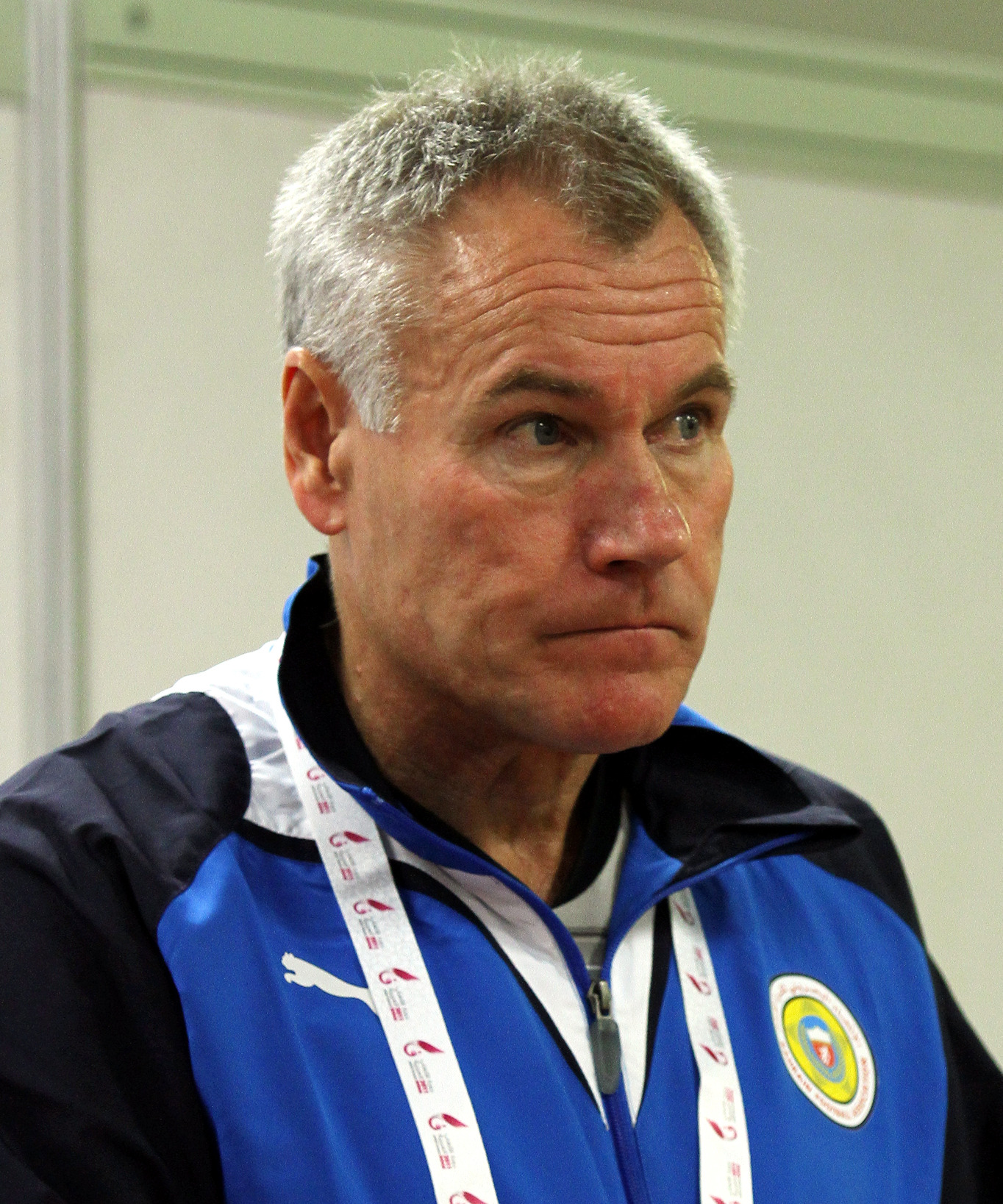
Gillingham manager Peter Taylor left his post shortly after leading the team to promotion.

After the match, Gillingham's temporary captain Adrian Pennock received the winners' trophy jointly with the team's usual captain, Paul Smith, who had come on as a substitute. Taylor commented in a post-match interview that "These players, especially the ones that were here last year, deserved it. All season they've shown unbelievable character, and that's what they have done today. They never know when they are beaten." Benson commented particularly on the goal which Wigan felt they were denied, saying that in his opinion "It was well over [the goal line]". He went on to comment that "You feel cheated, but decisions like that are part of the game." The day after the game, the victorious players and officials took part in a celebratory open-top bus parade around the town of Gillingham.

In the aftermath of the match, Gillingham offered a new contract to manager Peter Taylor, but two weeks after leading the club to victory at Wembley he left to take over as manager of Premier League team Leicester City. Wigan manager John Benson had already announced before the play-off final that he would be leaving his post whatever the result, and he was replaced by Bruce Rioch. Following Taylor's departure, Paul Smith withdrew his transfer request, intimating that he no longer felt the need to leave the club now that Taylor had departed; he would remain at the club for a further five years. Hessenthaler was appointed to replace Taylor in a player-manager capacity.

As a result of their victory, Gillingham gained promotion to the second tier of English football for the first time in the club's 107-year history, and went on to spend five seasons at that level before being relegated in the 2004–05 season. Wigan reached the Second Division play-offs for a third season in a row in the 2000–01 season but once again failed to achieve promotion, losing at the semi-final stage to Reading. The club gained promotion to the second tier of English football in the 2002–03 season and achieved further promotion to the Premier League two years later.

The match was the penultimate game to be played at the original Wembley Stadium. The following day's First Division play-off final was the last match to take place at the stadium before it was mostly demolished and a new stadium of the same name built in its place. Reflecting on the game between Gillingham and Wigan on its 20th anniversary, Peter Taylor described it as one of the best memories of his career and paid tribute to the team spirit of the Gillingham players, stating "We had some real top blokes, real good spirits, your Ady Pennocks, your Barry Ashbys, they were all different class, really good attitudes. Players like Hessy, amazing characters and even though we would be losing you would have never written those players off, never."
