= Mark Lovell (footballer) =

English footballer

Personal information
- Date of birth: 16 July 1983 (age 43)
- Place of birth: Beckenham, England
- Position: Striker

Youth career
- 1999–2001: Gillingham

Senior career*
Years	Team	Apps	(Gls)
2001–2002	Gillingham	1	(0)
2001	→ St. Leonards (loan)		
- Hastings United
2006	Sittingbourne		
2006–??	Welling United		
2007	Sittingbourne		
2007	Dover Athletic		
2007–2010	Ashford Town (Kent)	58	(17)
2010–2011	Ramsgate		
2012–2013	Tonbridge Angels		
2013–2017	Herne Bay		
2017–????	Faversham Town		
- * Club domestic league appearances and goals as of 16:23, 9 November 2017 (UTC)

Mark Lovell (born 16 July 1983 in Beckenham) is an English footballer. He briefly played professionally for Gillingham. He is the son of former Welsh international striker Steve Lovell, and the grandson of former professional footballer Alan Lovell.

== Playing career ==
Lovell joined Gillingham, one of his father's old clubs, as a trainee in 1999 and was soon a regular for the club's reserve team, prompting Gillingham to sign him to a professional contract when he was still 17 years old. He made his debut for the Gills' first team in a match against Watford in May 2001.

The following season Lovell found himself unable to gain a foothold in the first team squad and was loaned out to St. Leonards. In March 2002 he had a trial spell with Leyton Orient but was not taken on. Shortly after this his contract at Priestfield Stadium expired and was not renewed.

Lovell next had a trial with Margate but again was not taken on. He later had a spell with Hastings United before joining Sittingbourne.

In 2006 Lovell had a brief spell with Welling United but then rejoined Sittingbourne, where his father was now manager. In June 2007 he joined Dover Athletic, now managed by his former Gillingham manager Andy Hessenthaler, but in November 2007 left The Crabble to link up with his father, who had recently been appointed manager of Ashford Town (Kent). Following the club's withdrawal from senior football in 2010, Lovell joined Ramsgate.

Ahead of the 2017–18 season, Lovell joined Faversham Town
