= Emmanuel Omoyinmi =

Nigerian footballer

Personal information
- Full name: Emmanuel Omoyinmi
- Date of birth: 28 December 1977 (age 48)
- Place of birth: Nigeria
- Height: 5 ft 6 in (1.68 m)
- Position: Forward

Youth career
- ?–1995: West Ham United

Senior career*
Years	Team	Apps	(Gls)
1995–2000	West Ham United	9	(2)
1996	→ AFC Bournemouth (loan)	7	(0)
1998	→ Dundee United (loan)	4	(0)
1999	→ Leyton Orient (loan)	4	(1)
1999	→ Gillingham (loan)	9	(3)
1999–2000	→ Scunthorpe United (loan)	6	(1)
2000	→ Barnet (loan)	6	(0)
2000–2004	Oxford United	67	(9)
2003	→ Margate (loan)	11	(3)
2004	→ Margate (loan)	3	(2)
2004	→ Gravesend & Northfleet (loan)	7	(2)
2004–2005	Gravesend & Northfleet	35	(6)
2005–2006	Lewes	10	(0)
2006	Worthing	1	(0)
Total		179	(29)
- * Club domestic league appearances and goals

Emmanuel Omoyinmi (born 28 December 1977) is a former professional footballer who played as a forward. Born in Nigeria, he played for England Schoolboys.

He began his career at West Ham United, where he was most noted for an incident in which he played in a League Cup quarter-final game when ineligible; West Ham were later knocked out of the competition in a replayed game.

Following a series of loans to other clubs, Omoyinmi joined Oxford United in 2000 for whom he made 67 league appearances, scoring nine goals. He then went on to play non-league football.

== Club career ==
Omoyinmi joined West Ham United as a trainee in May 1995. He was unable to gain a regular place in the first team, making only 13 league and cup appearances in five years, of which eleven were as substitute, scoring two goals. Both goals came in a 3–3 draw with Crystal Palace in May 1998. He had several spells on loan between 1996 and 1999 at AFC Bournemouth, Dundee United, Leyton Orient and Gillingham.

During his loan spell at Gillingham, he played for the club in both legs of their second round Football League Cup tie with Bolton Wanderers. After returning to West Ham, he appeared as a substitute in a quarter final round of the same competition against Aston Villa. As he had played for a different club in an earlier round of the competition, he was ineligible to play. The match was replayed and West Ham, who had won the first game, lost the replay and were eliminated from the competition.

Immediately following the first match against Aston Villa, Omoyimni went on loan to Scunthorpe United for three months and then to Barnet for the rest of the season. He left West Ham at the end of the season. Omoyinmi joined Oxford United on a free transfer in June 2000. He made 77 league and cup appearances for Oxford in four years, scoring nine goals. He also had loan spells during the 2003–04 season at Margate, and at Gravesend & Northfleet.

Omoyinmi joined Gravesend & Northfleet on a permanent basis in May 2004, making 35 appearances and scoring six goals. He later played for Lewes, and Worthing.
