= Michael Phillips (footballer) =

British footballer (born 1983)

Personal information
- Date of birth: 22 January 1983 (age 43)
- Place of birth: Dulwich, London, England
- Position: Midfielder

Team information
- Current team: Maidstone United (under-23s coach)

Youth career
- Crystal Palace

Senior career*
Years	Team	Apps	(Gls)
–2004	Crystal Palace	0	(0)
2000–2004	Gillingham	1	(0)
2004–2005	Worthing		
2005–2006	Welling United		
2006–2008	Ramsgate		
2008–2009	Tonbridge Angels	22	(0)
2009–2010	Hastings United		
2010–2011	Maidstone United	11	(1)
2011	Erith Town		
2011–2014	Maidstone United	56	(7)
2014–2017	Ashford United	63	(6)
2019–2020	Sheppey United		
- * Club domestic league appearances and goals

Michael Phillips (born 22 January 1983) is an English retired footballer who is an under-23s coach for National League side Maidstone United.

== Career ==
Phillips began his career with Gillingham, who played at the time in the Football League First Division. He made his debut for the club's first team against Blackburn Rovers in May 2001. This was to be his only appearance, however, as his subsequent career was dogged by injury. He was forced to retire from the professional game in 2004 and went on to play non-League football for Worthing, Welling United, Ramsgate, Tonbridge Angels and Hastings United before signing for Maidstone United in December 2010. Phillips then left the Stones in the summer of 2011 to join Erith Town where he took up a player/assistant manager role, however he returned to Maidstone in a playing role in October 2011. Phillips played for Maidstone until 2014 and later played for Ashford United and Sheppey United. He re-joined Maidstone as under-23s coach in 2021.

== Personal life ==
In 2004, Phillips alleged that he, his parents, and girlfriend Alex Day had been assaulted by police while on holiday in Portugal. Phillips himself suffered a broken jaw and nose.
