= Roland Edge =

English footballer

Personal information
- Full name: Roland Edge
- Date of birth: 25 November 1978 (age 47)
- Place of birth: Chatham, England
- Height: 5 ft 9 in (1.75 m)
- Position: Defender

Team information
- Current team: Dartford (assistant manager)

Youth career
- –1997: Gillingham

Senior career*
Years	Team	Apps	(Gls)
1997–2003	Gillingham	102	(1)
2003–2004	Hibernian	20	(0)
2004–2006	Hull City	22	(0)
2006–2008	Folkestone Invicta	?	
2008–2010	Maidstone United	45	(2)
2010–2015	Folkestone Invicta		

Managerial career
- 2022–2023: Folkestone Invicta (joint manager)
- * Club domestic league appearances and goals as of 14:20, 3 May 2024 (UTC)

Roland Edge (born 25 November 1978) is an English former footballer who is assistant manager at Dartford.

== Career ==
=== Gillingham ===
Edge made his professional debut for Gillingham as a 40th minute substitute in a 1–0 away league loss to Chesterfield in September 1998.

In just his second season with the Kent side Edge featured in the FA Cup quarter finals as Gillingham lost 5–0 to Chelsea at Stamford Bridge, and at Wembley as they defeated Wigan Athletic 3–2 in the Football League Second Division play-off final to gain promotion to the second tier for the first time in the club's history.

Edge would go on to make 125 league and cup appearances in six years with the Gills, but was released in 2003 after being unable to agree contract terms.

=== Hibernian ===
After a period training with Hartlepool United Edge signed on a free transfer for Scottish Premier League side Hibernian in August 2003.

During his one-season stay with the Leith side Edge played in the 2004 Scottish League Cup final, which Hibernian lost 2–0 to Livingston.

=== Hull City ===
Edge joined Hull City of League One on a free transfer in July 2004. Hull were promoted to the Championship that season as runners up but Edge was limited to just 16 appearances in all competitions.

His contract was terminated by mutual consent in January 2006 after struggling with a long term injury.

=== Non-league ===
Injuries curtailed Edge's professional career and he moved onto non-league Folkestone Invicta before joining Maidstone United. He re-joined Folkestone Invicta as a player-coach in June 2010. He was later appointed as Assistant Manager of the side.

He made his final of 178 total appearances for Folkestone Invicta.

== Coaching career ==
Following the departure of long-serving manager Neil Cugley, Edge was appointed joint-manager of Folkestone Invicta alongside Michael Everitt. In November 2023, Everitt and Edge were sacked by the club.

On 3 May 2024, Edge was announced as the new assistant manager at Dartford.

== Personal life ==
Since leaving professional football Edge has worked as a teacher.

== Honours ==
Gillingham

- Football League Second Division play-offs: 2000

Hibernian

- Scottish League Cup runner-up: 2003–04

Hull City

- Football League One runner-up: 2004–05

Folkestone Invicta

- Isthmian League Division One South runner-up: 2013–14, 2014–15
