= Barry Miller (footballer) =

English footballer

Personal information
- Full name: Barry Steven Miller
- Date of birth: 29 March 1976 (age 50)
- Place of birth: Ealing, England
- Position: Defender

Youth career
- Brentford

Senior career*
Years	Team	Apps	(Gls)
1996–1997	Wokingham	0	(0)
1997–1999	Farnborough Town	1	(3)
1999–2000	Gillingham	4	(0)
2000	→ Woking (loan)	17	(0)
2000	→ Doncaster Rovers (loan)	4	(0)
2000–2003	Doncaster Rovers	66	(2)
2003–2004	Hucknall Town	?	(?)
2004	Leigh RMI	20	(1)
2004–2006	→ Burton Albion (loan)	19	(2)
Total		132	(7)
- * Club domestic league appearances and goals

Barry Steven Miller (born 29 March 1976) is an English former professional footballer and was active between 1996 and 2004 and played in England. He played in the Football League for Gillingham, and also had spells with clubs including Doncaster Rovers, Wokingham, Gillingham, Woking, Hucknall Town, Leigh RMI, Farnborough Town and Burton Albion.

== Career ==
Miller began his career as a junior with Brentford, but didn't make any first team appearances before moving to Wokingham in August 1996 on a free transfer.

He moved to Farnborough in August 1997, and shortly moved to Gillingham, where he didn't make as much of an impact as he would have liked. He then went on two successful loan spells to Woking and Doncaster Rovers. In September 2000, he made his loan move to Doncaster Rovers permanent and enjoyed his most successful spell at a club in his career.
