= Junior Lewis =

English footballer (born 1973)

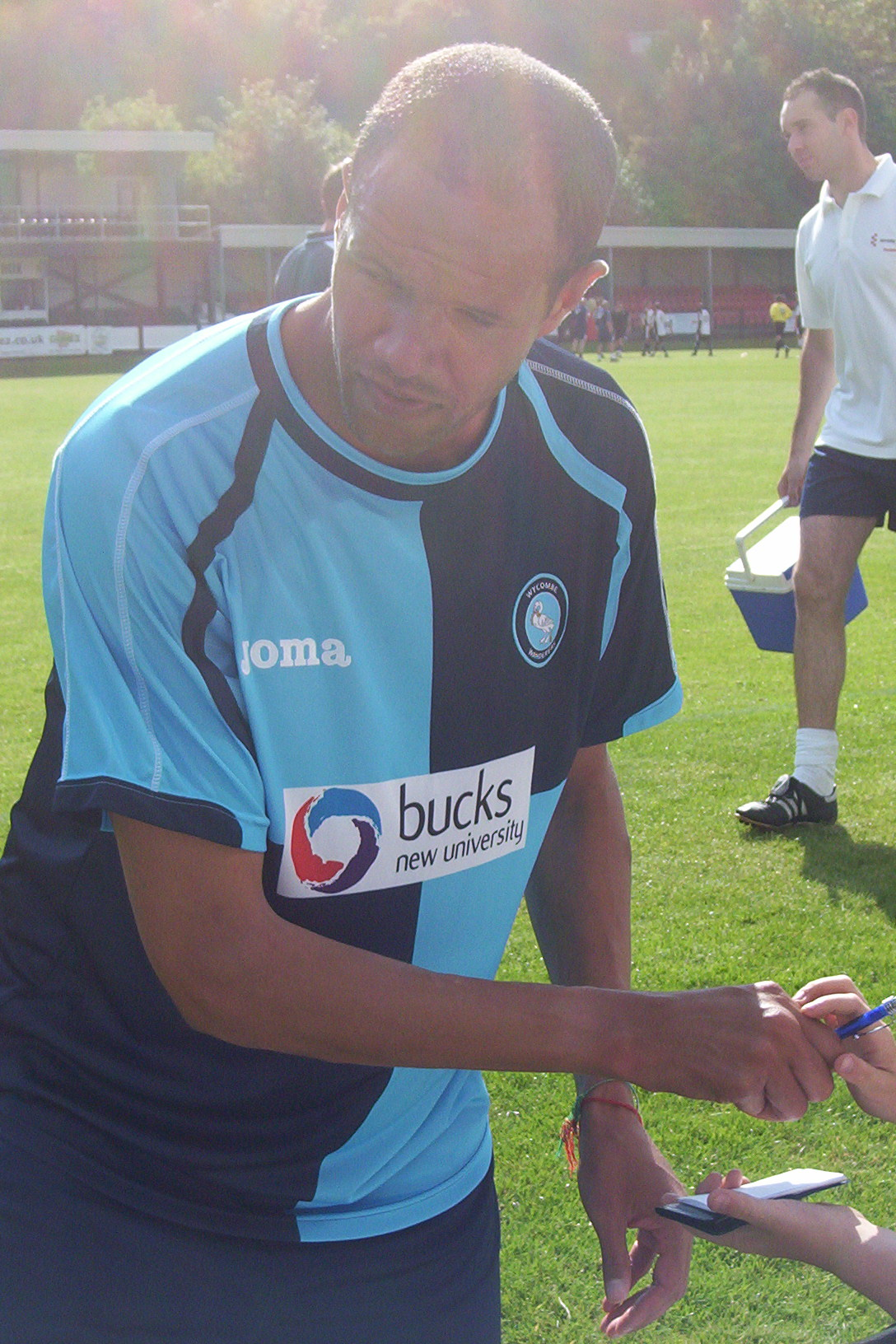
- Lewis pictured in 2009

Personal information
- Full name: Carl Junior Lewis
- Date of birth: 9 October 1973 (age 53)
- Place of birth: Wembley, England
- Position: Midfielder

Team information
- Current team: Hednesford Town (assistant manager)

Youth career
- –1992: Fulham

Senior career*
Years	Team	Apps	(Gls)
1992–1993	Fulham	6	(0)
1993–1996	Dover Athletic	84	(0)
1996	Hayes	6	
1996–1999	Hendon	100	(50)
1999–2001	Gillingham	59	(8)
2001	→ Leicester City (loan)	5	(0)
2001–2004	Leicester City	25	(1)
2002	→ Brighton & Hove Albion (loan)	15	(3)
2003	→ Swindon Town (loan)	9	(0)
2003	→ Swindon Town (loan)	4	(0)
2004	→ Hull City (loan)	13	(1)
2004–2005	Hull City	39	(1)
2005–2006	Brentford	14	(0)
2006	Milton Keynes Dons	0	(0)
2006–2007	Edgware Town	14	(2)
2007–2008	Stevenage Borough	8	(0)
2008	Welwyn Garden City	0	(0)
2011–2014	Hendon	1	(0)
Total		402	(66)
- * Club domestic league appearances and goals

Carl Junior Lewis (born 9 October 1973) is an English former footballer who is assistant manager at Hednesford Town.

== Playing career ==
Lewis started his career at Fulham as a youngster, making his Football League debut as a substitute against Burnley on 17 October 1992. He went on to make five further league appearances for Fulham starting four matches and playing in one FA Cup game before dropping out of the league in 1993 for spells with Dover Athletic and Hendon. During his first spell with Hendon from 1996 to 1999, he made a total of 146 appearances scoring 68 goals, famously scoring the winner in an FA Cup 1st round replay at Leyton Orient. Lewis returned to league football in 1999 signing for Gillingham.

After a season and a half at Priestfield, Lewis transferred to Leicester City of the Premier League with subsequent spells at Brighton & Hove Albion (on loan), Swindon Town, Hull City, Brentford, Milton Keynes Dons and Stevenage Borough.

== Coaching career ==
On 20 June 2008, Lewis was reunited with Peter Taylor, his manager at six previous clubs (Dover, Gillingham, Leicester, Brighton, Hull and Stevenage), joining the backroom staff at Wycombe Wanderers. When Taylor parted company with Wycombe by mutual consent in October 2009, Lewis also left the club with the pair subsequently reunited once again at Bradford City, the eighth club at which Lewis had worked with Taylor either as a player or as part of Taylor's coaching staff.

Between his roles at Wycombe and Bradford, Lewis joined Welwyn Garden City of the Spartan South Midlands League Premier Division.

In 2011 Lewis rejoined Hendon as player-coach, having been unemployed since leaving Bradford City towards the end of 2010–11.

On 19 June 2014, it was announced that Lewis would join the coaching staff at Leeds United, working as assistant coach under the newly appointed head coach Dave Hockaday. The appointment was met largely with surprise by the fans of Leeds United, as Lewis had previously been with eighth tier Hendon.

On 28 August 2014, Lewis and head coach Hockaday were sacked by owner Massimo Cellino, having been in the job for only 70 days.

He returned to coaching for the 2015–16 season with Canvey Island. In September 2015, he joined Boreham Wood as first team coach.

Lewis was appointed joint assistant manager alongside Darren Currie at Dagenham & Redbridge for the 2017–18 season.

Lewis joined Barnet as first team coach for the 2018–19 season, following manager John Still and assistant Currie to the Bees. Following the resignation of Still and the promotion of Currie to head coach, Lewis took over Currie's former role as assistant head coach.

Lewis, and Currie, left Barnet at the end of the 2019–20 season.

== Honours ==
Gillingham

- Football League Second Division play-offs: 2000

Brighton & Hove Albion

- Football League Second Division: 2001–02
