= 2002–03 Preston North End F.C. season =

English football club season

Preston North End
2002–03 season
- Manager: Craig Brown
- Stadium: Deepdale
- Football League First Division: 12th
- FA Cup: Third Round
- League Cup: Fourth Round

The 2002–03 season saw Preston North End compete in the Football League First Division where they finished in 12th position with 61 points.

== Final league table ==
Pos	Team	Pld	W	D	L	GF	GA	GD	Pts
10	Wimbledon	46	18	11	17	76	73	+3	65
11	Gillingham	46	16	14	16	56	65	−9	62
12	Preston North End	46	16	13	17	68	70	−2	61
13	Watford	46	17	9	20	54	70	−16	60
14	Crystal Palace	46	14	17	15	59	52	+7	59

Updated to match(es) played on 11 May 2003. Source: Soccerway
Rules for classification: 1) points; 2) goal difference; 3) number of goals scored.

== Results ==
Preston North End's score comes first

=== Legend ===
Win	Draw	Loss

=== Football League First Division ===
Match	Date	Opponent	Venue	Result	Attendance	Scorers
1	10 August 2002	Crystal Palace	H	1–2	14,663	Fuller
2	14 August 2002	Nottingham Forest	A	2–2	18,065	Fuller, Etuhu
3	17 August 2002	Rotherham United	A	0–0	6,885	
4	24 August 2002	Stoke City	H	4–3	15,422	Healy (2), Fuller, Cresswell
5	26 August 2002	Gillingham	A	1–1	7,785	Cresswell
6	1 September 2002	Ipswich Town	H	0–0	15,357	
7	14 September 2002	Sheffield Wednesday	H	2–2	13,652	Fuller, Cresswell
8	17 September 2002	Watford	H	1–1	12,408	Cresswell
9	21 September 2002	Derby County	A	2–0	29,257	Healy, Etuhu
10	24 September 2002	Wolverhampton Wanderers	A	0–4	23,695	
11	28 September 2002	Norwich City	H	1–2	13,550	Cresswell
12	5 October 2002	Bradford City	A	1–1	13,215	Alexander
13	19 October 2002	Walsall	A	3–3	6,832	Alexander, Healy, Lucketti
14	26 October 2002	Reading	H	1–0	13,021	Cresswell
15	29 October 2002	Portsmouth	A	2–3	18,367	Cresswell, Alexander
16	2 November 2002	Burnley	H	3–1	16,046	Fuller (2), McKenna
17	9 November 2002	Millwall	A	1–2	7,554	Fuller
18	16 November 2002	Grimsby Town	A	3–3	5,774	Cresswell, Alexander, Etuhu
19	23 November 2002	Brighton & Hove Albion	H	2–2	13,068	Cresswell, Lucketti
20	26 November 2002	Leicester City	H	2–0	13,048	Fuller (2)
21	30 November 2002	Coventry City	A	2–1	13,313	Cresswell, Lewis
22	7 December 2002	Wimbledon	H	3–5	12,415	Leigertwood (o.g.), McKenna, Alexander
23	14 December 2002	Grimsby Town	H	3–0	12,420	Alexander, Cresswell, Healy
24	21 December 2002	Sheffield United	A	0–1	16,342	
25	26 December 2002	Rotherham United	H	0–2	15,542	
26	28 December 2002	Crystal Palace	A	0–2	18,484	
27	1 January 2003	Stoke City	A	1–2	14,862	Abbott
28	18 January 2003	Ipswich Town	A	0–3	24,666	
29	25 January 2003	Nottingham Forest	H	1–1	13,503	Cartwright
30	1 February 2003	Gillingham	H	3–0	12,121	Lewis, Alexander, Ashby (o.g.)
31	8 February 2003	Millwall	H	2–1	13,117	Lewis, Cartwright
32	22 February 2003	Wolverhampton Wanderers	H	0–2	16,070	
33	1 March 2003	Sheffield Wednesday	A	1–0	18,912	Cresswell
34	4 March 2003	Watford	A	1–0	11,101	Alexander
35	8 March 2003	Derby County	H	4–2	14,003	Alexander, Etuhu, Koumantarakis, Cresswell
36	15 March 2003	Leicester City	A	1–2	30,713	Lewis
37	18 March 2003	Walsall	H	5–0	11,170	Alexander, Etuhu, Cresswell, Koumantarakis (2)
38	22 March 2003	Portsmouth	H	1–1	16,665	McKenna
39	5 April 2003	Coventry City	H	2–2	13,026	Cresswell, Abbott
40	8 April 2003	Burnley	A	0–2	12,245	
41	12 April 2003	Brighton & Hove Albion	A	2–0	6,669	Cresswell, Jackson
42	15 April 2003	Reading	A	1–5	14,012	Mears
43	19 April 2003	Sheffield United	H	2–0	14,793	Etuhu, Lewis
44	21 April 2003	Wimbledon	A	0–2	1,053	
45	26 April 2003	Bradford City	H	1–0	13,652	Abbott
46	4 May 2003	Norwich City	A	0–2	20,232	

=== FA Cup ===
Match	Date	Opponent	Venue	Result	Attendance	Scorers
R3	4 January 2003	Rochdale	H	1–2	8,762	Anderson

=== Football League Cup ===
Match	Date	Opponent	Venue	Result	Attendance	Scorers
R1	11 September 2002	Scunthorpe United	H	2–1	5,594	Fuller, Alexander
R2	1 October 2002	Macclesfield Town	A	2–1	2,036	Skora, Jackson
R3	5 November 2002	Birmingham City	A	2–0	12,241	Fuller, Lewis
R4	4 December 2002	Aston Villa	A	0–5	23,042	

== Squad statistics ==
No.	Pos.	Name	League		FA Cup		League Cup		Total	
No.	Pos.	Name	Apps	Goals	Apps	Goals	Apps	Goals	Apps	Goals
1	GK	(England) David Lucas	19(2)	0	0	0	4	0	23(2)	0
2	DF	(Scotland) Graham Alexander	45	10	1	0	4	1	50	11
3	DF	(Scotland) Brian O'Neil	12(3)	0	0	0	0	0	12(3)	0
4	MF	(Nigeria) Dickson Etuhu	33(6)	6	1	0	4	0	38(6)	6
5	DF	(England) Michael Jackson	21(1)	1	0	0	1	1	22(1)	2
6	DF	(England) Marlon Broomes	21(7)	0	1	0	3	0	25(7)	0
6	DF	(England) Sean Gregan	0	0	0	0	0	0	0	0
7	MF	(England) Lee Cartwright	13(9)	2	0(1)	0	0(2)	0	13(12)	0
8	MF	(England) Mark Rankine	11(7)	0	0	0	1(3)	0	12(10)	0
9	FW	(Jamaica) Ricardo Fuller	18	9	0	0	1(1)	2	19(1)	11
10	FW	(South Africa) George Koumantarakis	10	3	0	0	0	0	10	3
11	FW	(Northern Ireland) David Healy	12(11)	5	1	0	4	0	17(11)	5
13	GK	(England) Andy Lonergan	0	0	0	0	0	0	0	0
14	DF	(Northern Ireland) Colin Murdock	24	0	1	0	1(1)	0	26(1)	0
15	DF	(Wales) Rob Edwards	26	0	0	0	2	0	28	0
16	MF	(England) Paul McKenna	39(2)	3	1	0	3	0	43(2)	3
17	MF	(United States) Eddie Lewis	34(4)	5	1	0	3(1)	1	38(5)	6
18	FW	(Poland) Pawel Abbott	6(10)	3	1	0	0	0	7(10)	3
19	MF	(Republic of Ireland) Michael Keane	1(4)	0	0	1	0	0	2(4)	0
20	DF	(England) Chris Lucketti	43	2	1	0	4	0	48	2
21	GK	(Finland) Tepi Moilanen	14(1)	0	1	0	0(2)	0	15(3)	0
22	DF	(England) Adam Eaton	0(1)	0	0	0	1	0	1(10	0
23	FW	(England) Mark Wright	0	0	0	0	0	0	0	0
24	DF	(Jamaica) Tyrone Mears	11(11)	1	0(1)	0	1	0	12(12)	1
25	FW	(England) Richard Cresswell	42	16	0	0	0	0	42	16
26	FW	(France) Éric Skora	30(5)	0	1	0	2	1	33(5)	1
27	MF	(Republic of Ireland) Alan McCormack	0	0	0	0	0	0	0	0
28	MF	(Republic of Ireland) Brian Barry-Murphy	2	0	0	0	0	0	2	0
29	FW	(England) Joe O'Neill	0	0	0	0	0	0	0	0
30	GK	(Republic of Ireland) Kelham O'Hanlon	0	0	0	0	0	0	0	0
31	MF	(Scotland) Iain Anderson	0(8)	0	0(1)	1	1	0	1(9)	1
34	FW	(Scotland) Simon Lynch	6(11)	0	0	0	0	0	6(11)	0
40	GK	(Scotland) Jonathan Gould	13(1)	0	0	0	0	0	13(1)	0
