= 2001–02 Preston North End F.C. season =

English football club season

Preston North End
2001–02 season
- Chairman: Derek Shaw
- Manager: David Moyes (until 14 March); Kelham O'Hanlon (caretaker 15 March – 28 April)
- Stadium: Deepdale
- First Division: 8th
- FA Cup: Fifth Round
- League Cup: Second Round
- Top goalscorer: League: Cresswell (12); All: Cresswell (15)

The 2001–02 season saw Preston North End compete in the Football League First Division where they finished in 8th position with 72 points.

== Final league table ==
Pos	Team	Pld	W	D	L	GF	GA	GD	Pts	Qualification or relegation
6	Norwich City	46	22	9	15	60	51	+9	75	Qualification for the First Division play-offs
7	Burnley	46	21	12	13	70	62	+8	75	
8	Preston North End	46	20	12	14	71	59	+12	72	
9	Wimbledon	46	18	13	15	63	57	+6	67	
10	Crystal Palace	46	20	6	20	70	62	+8	66	

Rules for classification: 1) Points; 2) Goal difference; 3) Goals scored

== Results ==
Preston North End's score comes first

=== Legend ===
Win	Draw	Loss

=== Football League First Division ===
Match	Date	Opponent	Venue	Result	Attendance	Scorers
1	11 August 2001	Gillingham	A	0–5	9,412	
2	18 August 2001	Walsall	H	1–1	11,402	Murdock
3	25 August 2001	Grimsby Town	A	2–2	5,782	Murdock, Healy
4	27 August 2001	Wimbledon	H	1–1	13,349	Keane
5	8 September 2001	Wolverhampton Wanderers	H	1–2	14,381	Lucketti
6	15 September 2001	Millwall	H	1–0	11,371	Anderson
7	18 September 2001	West Bromwich Albion	A	0–2	18,209	
8	23 September 2001	Birmingham City	H	1–0	23,004	Edwards
9	26 September 2001	Norwich City	H	4–0	12,014	Alexander, Macken (2), Edwards
10	30 September 2001	Watford	A	1–1	18,911	Macken
11	13 October 2001	Crewe Alexandra	A	1–2	7,746	Rankine
12	16 October 2001	Sheffield Wednesday	A	2–1	15,592	Rankine, Macken
13	21 October 2001	Manchester City	H	2–1	21,014	Macken, Healy
14	23 October 2001	Sheffield United	H	3–0	14,027	Macken, Healy, Gallacher
15	27 October 2001	Portsmouth	A	1–0	15,402	Cartwright
16	31 October 2001	Coventry City	A	2–2	15,755	Lucketti, Cresswell
17	3 November 2001	Stockport County	H	6–0	13,776	Healy (3), Lucketti, Cresswell, McKenna
18	8 November 2001	Barnsley	A	2–2	19,042	Rankine, Cresswell
19	17 November 2001	Nottingham Forest	A	1–1	21,020	Cresswell
20	20 November 2001	Bradford City	H	1–1	13,763	Alexander
21	24 November 2001	Crystal Palace	H	2–1	15,264	Alexander, Cresswell
22	1 December 2001	Sheffield United	A	2–2	16,270	Healy, Cresswell
23	9 December 2001	Burnley	H	2–3	20,370	McKenna, Alexander
24	15 December 2001	Rotherham United	A	0–1	6,558	
25	22 December 2001	Grimsby Town	H	0–0	14,667	
26	26 December 2001	Wolverhampton Wanderers	A	3–2	24,024	Healy, Anderson, Gregan
27	29 December 2001	Wimbledon	A	0–2	6,501	
28	12 January 2002	Walsall	A	2–1	6,314	Anderson, Basham
29	19 January 2002	Gillingham	H	0–2	13,289	
30	29 January 2002	Bradford City	A	1–0	15,217	Keane
31	31 January 2002	Watford	H	1–1	12,746	Alexander
32	5 February 2002	Sheffield Wednesday	H	4–2	14,038	Etuhu, Macken, Reid, Healy
33	10 February 2002	Manchester City	H	2–3	34,220	Anderson, Macken
34	22 February 2002	Norwich City	A	0–3	19,506	
35	26 February 2002	West Bromwich Albion	H	1–0	14,487	Etuhu
36	2 March 2002	Birmingham City	H	1–0	15,543	Purse (o.g.)
37	5 March 2002	Millwall	A	1–2	11,071	Healy
38	9 March 2002	Rotherham United	H	2–1	14,579	Cresswell (2)
39	17 March 2002	Burnley	A	1–2	18,388	Anderson
40	20 March 2002	Crewe Alexandra	H	2–2	13,369	McKenna, Cresswell
41	23 March 2002	Stockport County	A	2–0	6,139	McKenna, Cresswell
42	30 March 2002	Portsmouth	H	2–0	16,832	Alexander, Wijnhard
43	1 April 2002	Barnsley	A	1–2	14,188	Wijnhard
44	6 April 2002	Coventry City	H	4–0	15,655	Wijnhard, Etuhu, Ainsworth, Cresswell
45	13 April 2002	Crystal Palace	A	0–2	21,361	
46	21 April 2002	Nottingham Forest	H	2–1	17,390	Cresswell, Rankine

=== FA Cup ===
Match	Date	Opponent	Venue	Result	Attendance	Scorers
R3	15 January 2002	Brighton & Hove Albion	A	2–0	6,548	Skora, Macken
R4	26 January 2002	Sheffield United	H	2–1	13,068	Alexander, Cresswell
R5	17 February 2002	Chelsea	A	1–3	28,133	Cresswell

=== Football League Cup ===
Match	Date	Opponent	Venue	Result	Attendance	Scorers
R1	21 August 2001	Kidderminster Harriers	A	3–2	2,227	Macken, Gallacher, Jackson
R2	11 September 2001	Tranmere Rovers	A	1–4	5,143	Cresswell

== Squad statistics ==
No.	Pos.	Name	League		FA Cup		League Cup		Total	
No.	Pos.	Name	Apps	Goals	Apps	Goals	Apps	Goals	Apps	Goals
1	GK	(England) David Lucas	23(1)	0	1	0	0	0	24(1)	0
2	DF	(Scotland) Graham Alexander	45	6	3	1	2	0	50	7
3	DF	(England) Paul Reid	0(1)	1	0	0	0	0	0(1)	1
4	DF	(England) Ryan Kidd	5(1)	0	0	0	1	0	6(1)	0
5	DF	(England) Michael Jackson	12(1)	0	0	0	1	1	13(1)	1
6	DF	(England) Sean Gregan	40(1)	1	2	0	2	0	44(1)	1
7	MF	(England) Lee Cartwright	34(2)	1	1(1)	0	0(1)	0	35(4)	1
8	MF	(England) Mark Rankine	24(2)	4	0	0	1	0	25(2)	4
9	FW	(Netherlands) Clyde Wijnhard	6	3	0	0	0	0	6	3
10	FW	(England) Steve Basham	0(16)	1	1(1)	0	0(1)	0	1(18)	1
11	FW	(Northern Ireland) David Healy	35(9)	10	2(1)	0	2	0	39(10)	10
12	FW	(Scotland) Kevin Gallacher	1(4)	1	0	0	0(1)	1	1(5)	2
14	DF	(Northern Ireland) Colin Murdock	22(1)	2	2	0	2	0	26(1)	2
15	DF	(Wales) Rob Edwards	36	2	3	0	1	0	40	2
16	MF	(England) Paul McKenna	37(1)	4	2	0	1	0	40(1)	4
17	MF	(England) Gareth Ainsworth	3(2)	1	0	0	0	0	3(2)	1
17	FW	(Republic of Ireland) Jon Macken	28(3)	8	2(1)	0	1	1	31(4)	9
18	FW	(Poland) Pawel Abbott	0	0	0	0	0	0	0	0
19	FW	(Iceland) Þórður Guðjónsson	4(3)	0	0(1)	0	0	0	4(4)	0
20	DF	(England) Chris Lucketti	40	3	3	0	1	0	44	3
21	GK	(Finland) Tepi Moilanen	23(1)	0	2	0	1	0	26(1)	0
22	DF	(England) Adam Eaton	6(6)	0	0	0	1	0	7(6)	0
23	FW	(England) Mark Wright	0	0	0	0	0	0	0	0
24	MF	(Northern Ireland) Steve Robinson	0(2)	0	0(1)	0	0(1)	0	0(4)	0
25	FW	(England) Richard Cresswell	27(13)	12	1(1)	2	1(1)	1	29(15)	15
26	MF	(Nigeria) Dickson Etuhu	16	3	0	0	0	0	16	3
27	MF	(Scotland) Colin Hendry	2	0	0	0	0	0	2	0
28	MF	(Republic of Ireland) Brian Barry-Murphy	2(2)	0	0(1)	0	0	0	2(3)	0
29	FW	(England) Joe O'Neill	0	0	0	0	0	0	0	0
30	GK	(Republic of Ireland) Kelham O'Hanlon	0	0	0	0	0	0	0	0
31	MF	(Scotland) Iain Anderson	16(15)	5	3	0	2	0	21(15)	5
34	FW	(France) Éric Skora	2(2)	0	2	1	0	0	4(2)	1
38	MF	(Republic of Ireland) Michael Keane	17(3)	2	3	0	0(1)	0	20(4)	2
