= 2005 Football League Championship play-off final =

Association football match in Cardiff, UK

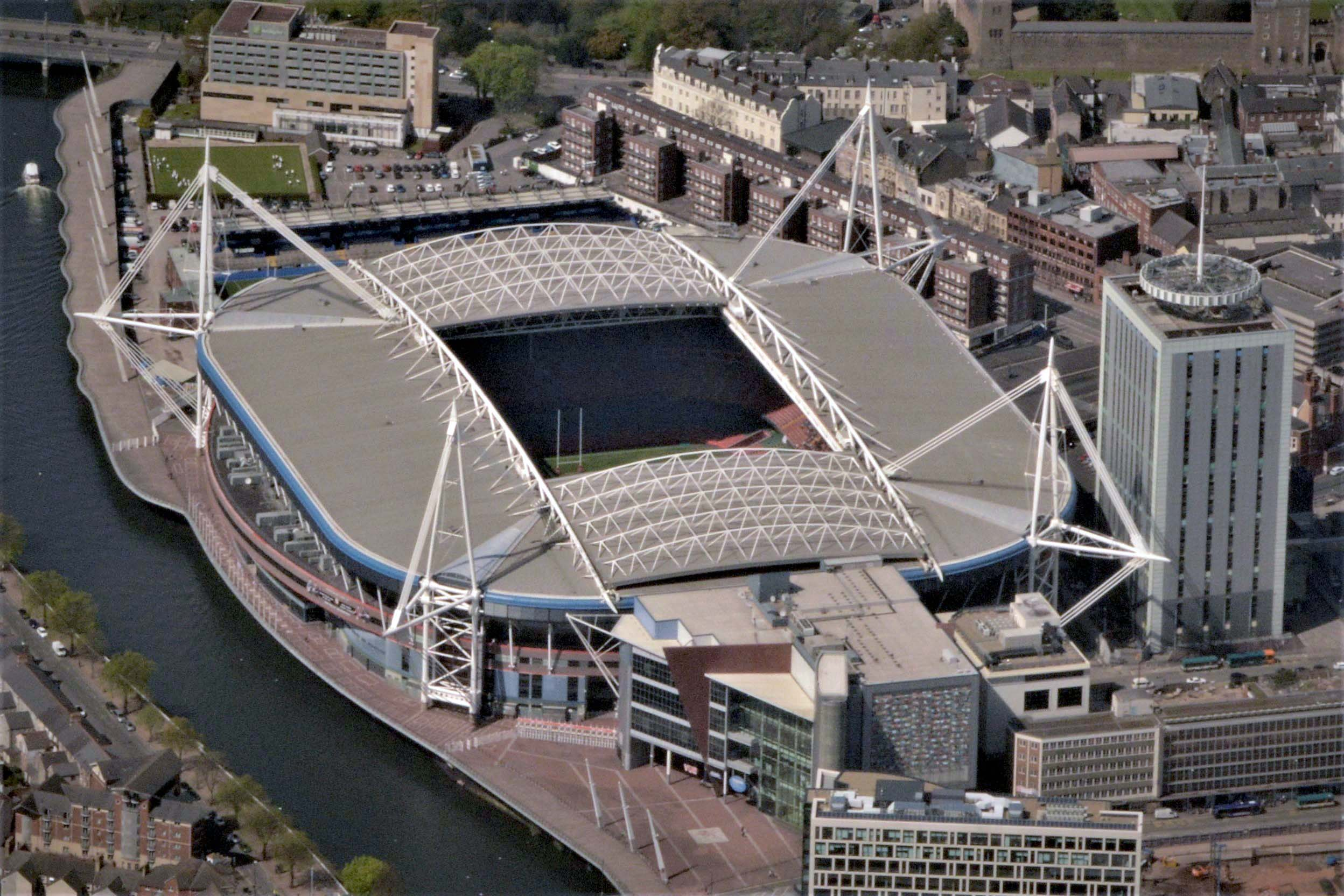
- The match was played at the Millennium Stadium in Cardiff.
Preston North End	West Ham United
0	1
- Date: 30 May 2005
- Venue: Millennium Stadium, Cardiff
- Referee: Mike Riley
- Attendance: 70,275

The 2005 Football League Championship play-off final was an association football match which was played on 30 May 2005 at the Millennium Stadium, Cardiff, between Preston North End and West Ham United. The match was to determine the third and final team to gain promotion from the Football League Championship, the second tier of English football, to the FA Premier League. The top two teams of the 2004–05 Football League Championship season gained automatic promotion to the Premier League, while the clubs placed from third to sixth place in the table took part in play-off semi-finals; Preston ended the season in fifth position while West Ham finished sixth. The winners of these semi-finals competed for the final place for the 2005–06 season in the Premier League. Ipswich Town and Derby County were the losing semi-finalists. Winning the final was estimated to be worth up to £31 million to the successful team.

The 2005 final was refereed by Mike Riley and was watched by a crowd of 70,275. West Ham won the match 1–0 with the only goal of the game coming from Bobby Zamora in the second half, and were promoted back to the Premier League after an absence of two years. His teammate Matthew Etherington was named man of the match.

West Ham finished their following season in ninth place in the Premier League. Preston's next season saw them finish in fourth place in the Championship, and qualify for the play-offs, where they lost 3–1 on aggregate to Leeds United in the semi-final.

== Route to the final ==
Football League Championship final table, leading positions
Pos	Team	Pld	W	D	L	GF	GA	GD	Pts
1	Sunderland	46	29	7	10	76	41	+35	94
2	Wigan Athletic	46	25	12	9	79	35	+44	87
3	Ipswich Town	46	24	13	9	85	56	+29	85
4	Derby County	46	22	10	14	71	60	+11	76
5	Preston North End	46	21	12	13	67	58	+9	75
6	West Ham United	46	21	10	15	66	56	+10	73

Preston North End finished the regular 2004–05 season in fifth place in the Football League Championship, the second tier of the English football league system, one place and two points ahead of West Ham United. Both therefore missed out on the two automatic places for promotion to the Premier League and instead took part in the play-offs, along with Ipswich Town and Derby County, to determine the third promoted team. Preston finished twelve points behind Wigan Athletic (who were promoted in second place) and nineteen behind league winners Sunderland.

West Ham United faced Ipswich Town in their play-off semi-final, with the first leg taking place at the Boleyn Ground in East London on 14 May 2005. The home team opened the scoring early in the first half as a cross from Matthew Etherington was converted from 5 yards (4.6 m) by Marlon Harewood. They doubled their lead six minutes later when, once again, Etherington crossed the ball and this time it was Bobby Zamora's strike which beat Kelvin Davis in the Ipswich goal. Just before half-time, the visitors halved the deficit when West Ham's goalkeeper Jimmy Walker conceded an own goal. Shefki Kuqi then equalised from close range following a defensive mix-up between Walker and Anton Ferdinand and match ended level on 2–2. The return leg was played at Portman Road in Ipswich four days later. After a goalless first half, Zamora scored twice in eleven minutes: the first was a close-range header from a Harewood cross while the second saw Zamora volley Harewood's pass into the Ipswich goal. West Ham won the match 2–0 and the semi-final 4–2 on aggregate to progress to the final.

In the other play-off semi-final, Preston North End's opponents were Derby County, the first leg being played at Deepdale in Preston on 15 May 2005. The home side were dominant in the first half and took the lead in the 38th minute when David Nugent beat Lee Camp in the Derby goal after picking up a flicked pass from Chris Sedgwick. Although Derby improved after the break, Preston doubled their lead in the final minute of the match. A defensive header deflected off Richard Cresswell past Camp to make the final score 2–0 to the home side. The second leg was played at Pride Park Stadium in Derby four days later. After a goalless first half, Grzegorz Rasiak won a penalty when he was brought down by Chris Lucketti in the penalty area. Rasiak himself took the spot kick but struck the post, and the game ended 0–0, with Preston qualifying for the final with a 2–0 aggregate victory.

== Match ==
=== Background ===
Preston were making their second appearance in a Championship play-off final, having lost in the 2001 final 3–0 against Bolton Wanderers. Preston had also featured in the 1994 Football League Third Division play-off final at the old Wembley Stadium where they lost 4–2 against Wycombe Wanderers. West Ham were losing finalists the previous season when they were beaten 1–0 by Crystal Palace. During the regular season, Preston had won both league encounters between the two clubs. They secured a 2–1 victory at Deepdale in December 2004 and won by the same scoreline at the Boleyn Ground the following March. During that match, Tomáš Řepka was sent off for headbutting Brian O'Neil in his right eye and a mass brawl ensued in the tunnel after the final whistle. Cresswell was the highest scorer for Preston throughout the season with 16 goals, while West Ham's top marksman was Teddy Sheringham who had 20 followed by Harewood with 17. Preston had played in the second tier of English football since gaining promotion in the 1999–2000 season as champions of the Football League Second Division, and had not taken part in the top tier for 44 years. Conversely, West Ham had played in the Championship for two seasons since being relegated from the Premiership in the 2002–03 season. Winning the play-off final was estimated in the media to be worth up to £35 million to the successful team; CNN described the game as "the world's richest club match". The referee for the match was Mike Riley who represented the West Riding County Football Association.

The West Ham manager Alan Pardew opted for a 4–4–2 formation, with Shaun Newton replacing Carl Fletcher in right midfield. Newton had been successful in the playoff finals on two previous occasions, winning with Charlton Athletic in the 1998 final and with Wolverhampton Wanderers in the 2003 final. Billy Davies, the Preston manager named an unchanged side from that which secured the goalless draw in the play-off semi-final, despite Graham Alexander having recovered from injury.

=== Summary ===
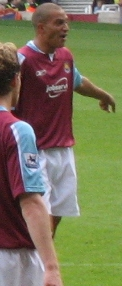
Bobby Zamora (pictured in 2006) scored the only goal of the game.

The game kicked off around 3 p.m. in front of a Millennium Stadium crowd of 70,275 spectators. After four minutes, Newton played a pass to Řepka whose shot struck the Preston goalpost. Walker's clearance then found Harewood who passed to Zamora. He found Etherington who took the ball into the Preston penalty area before seeing his shot palmed away by Carlo Nash. With West Ham defending in numbers, Preston were forced to derive chances to score from set pieces, with Lucketti's header from Eddie Lewis' corner being saved by Walker. Five minutes before the break, Nugent ran onto a long ball into the West Ham penalty area, but was tackled by Řepka. Just before half time, Zamora took advantage of poor defending from Claude Davis but the defender made a last-ditch tackle, and the half ended goalless.

Neither side made any changes during half time, and four minutes into the second half, a Paul McKenna corner headed toward the West Ham goal by Cresswell but Newton cleared the ball. Nigel Reo-Coker then passed to Harewood whose shot was pushed away one-handed by Nash. Zamora followed up but his attempt was cleared by Youl Mawéné and the second rebound was struck straight at Nash who gathered it. In the 57th minute Zamora sent a looping ball to Etherington down the left wing who beat Mawene. Davis slipped, allowing Etherington to cross for Zamora to score from 6 yards (5.5 m), his fourth goal in three play-off games, and put West Ham 1–0 ahead. There minutes later he had a chance to double his tally but headed an Etherington free kick over the Preston crossbar. Nugent then went on a run, beating four West Ham defenders before striking his shot straight at Walker. Davies then brought on Patrick Agyemang for Sedgwick, to play with three strikers. Zamora was then substituted by Pardew and replaced him with Christian Dailly in a holding midfield role. With three minutes remaining, Walker sprinted out to claim a high ball and took the ball out of his area, falling and twisting his right knee. He was booked and stretchered off and replaced by Stephen Bywater. His first action was to save the resulting Alexander free kick. Seven minutes of injury time were played before the match ended 1–0 to West Ham.

=== Details ===
30 May 2005

Preston North End	0–1	West Ham United
	Report	Zamora 57'

Millennium Stadium, Cardiff
Attendance: 70,275
Referee: Mike Riley (West Yorkshire)

Preston North End	West Ham United

GK	33	(England) Carlo Nash
RB	15	(France) Youl Mawéné	Booked	(substituted off) 87'
CB	22	(Jamaica) Claude Davis
CB	20	(England) Chris Lucketti
LB	18	(England) Matt Hill	Booked
RM	11	(England) Chris Sedgwick	(substituted off) 71'
CM	16	(England) Paul McKenna
CM	3	(Scotland) Brian O'Neil (substituted off) 81'
LM	17	(United States) Eddie Lewis
FW	25	(England) Richard Cresswell
CF	35	(England) David Nugent
Substitutes:
GK	12	(England) Gavin Ward
DF	2	(Scotland) Graham Alexander		(substituted on) 87'
DF	6	(England) Marlon Broomes
MF	4	(Nigeria) Dickson Etuhu		(substituted on) 82'
FW	9	(Ghana) Patrick Agyemang		(substituted on) 71'
Manager:
(Scotland) Billy Davies

GK	23	(England) Jimmy Walker	Booked	(substituted off) 87'
RB	2	(Czech Republic) Tomáš Řepka
CB	15	(England) Anton Ferdinand
CB	22	(England) Elliott Ward
LB	34	(England) Chris Powell
RM	26	(England) Shaun Newton	(substituted off) 82'
CM	20	(England) Nigel Reo-Coker
CM	17	(England) Hayden Mullins	Booked
LM	12	(England) Matthew Etherington
CF	10	(England) Marlon Harewood
CF	25	(England) Bobby Zamora	(substituted off) 74'
Substitutes:
GK	1	(England) Stephen Bywater		(substituted on) 87'
DF	7	(Scotland) Christian Dailly		(substituted on) 74'
MF	24	(England) Mark Noble		(substituted on) 82'
MF	6	(Wales) Carl Fletcher
FW	8	(England) Teddy Sheringham
Manager:
(England) Alan Pardew

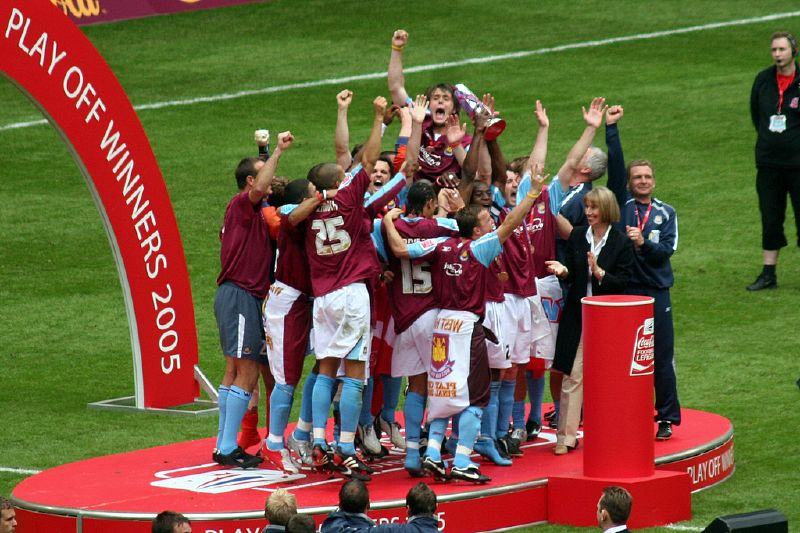
West Ham players celebrating the play-off final victory

Statistics
	West Ham United	Preston North End
Total shots	10	8
Shots on target	5	5
Ball possession	50%	50%
Corner kicks	2	5
Fouls committed	19	14
Offsides	3	1
Yellow cards	2	2
Red cards	0	0

== Post-match ==
Pardew commended his players: "It's a team effort. We defended well and we're back where we belong ... We're back in the Premiership, we'll do it justice and this lot will work hard next year". Chris Powell noted: "We've been fighting against all the critics, our gaffer has been under pressure but we stood firm. We've put this club back where it belongs, but we had to work hard". Davies, the losing manager, was proud of his team and said: "I can ask no more of the players. We have to be very proud of our season, we've learnt a lot ... this is football, we have to learn from the mistakes we've made." He conceded: "We didn't play particularly well on the day, but we had one or two chances and the first goal was crucial". West Ham's Etherington was named as man of the match.

West Ham finished their following season in ninth place in the Premier League. Preston's next season saw them finish in fourth place in the Championship, and qualify for the play-offs, where they lost 3–1 on aggregate to Leeds United in the semi-final.
