= 2004–05 Preston North End F.C. season =

English football club season

Preston North End
2004–05 season
- Chairman: Derek Shaw
- Manager: Craig Brown (until 29 August); Billy Davies (from 29 August)
- Stadium: Deepdale
- Championship: 5th
- FA Cup: Third round
- League Cup: Third round
- Top goalscorer: League: Richard Cresswell (16); All: Richard Cresswell (21)
- Average home league attendance: 12,841

During the 2004–05 English football season, Preston North End F.C. competed in the Football League Championship.

== Season summary ==
When Preston went down 1–0 at Brighton thanks to a Marlon Broomes own goal on 28 August 2004, a day later, Craig Brown was sacked and replaced with his assistant Billy Davies.

Davies took Preston to the 2005 play-off final for the first time since 2001, at Cardiff's Millennium Stadium but once again Preston ended up on the losing side, this time to West Ham United, losing 1–0.

It was during this season when The Preston Supporters Group (PSG), a supporter's organisation, arranged the “Return of the Gentry” in memory of John Tracey, a member of the original PNE Gentry who had passed away during the season.

== Final league table ==
Pos	Team	Pld	W	D	L	GF	GA	GD	Pts	Promotion, qualification or relegation
3	Ipswich Town	46	24	13	9	85	56	+29	85	Qualification for Championship play-offs
4	Derby County	46	22	10	14	71	60	+11	76	Qualification for Championship play-offs
5	Preston North End	46	21	12	13	67	58	+9	75	Qualification for Championship play-offs
6	West Ham United (O, P)	46	21	10	15	66	56	+10	73	Qualification for Championship play-offs
7	Reading	46	19	13	14	51	44	+7	70	

Updated to match(es) played on 9 December 2011. Source: Football League Tables
Rules for classification: 1) points; 2) goal difference; 3) number of goals scored.
(O) Play-off winners; (P) Promoted

== Results ==
Preston North End's score comes first

=== Legend ===
Win	Draw	Loss

=== Football League Championship ===
Date	Opponent	Venue	Result	Attendance	Scorers
7 August 2004	Watford	H	2–1	12,208	Cresswell, Healy (pen)
11 August 2004	Wolverhampton Wanderers	A	2–2	26,115	Lucketti, Healy
14 August 2004	Gillingham	A	1–2	7,073	Fuller
20 August 2004	Sheffield United	H	0–1	12,084	
28 August 2004	Brighton & Hove Albion	A	0–1	5,996	
30 August 2004	Rotherham United	H	2–0	11,439	Etuhu (2)
11 September 2004	Stoke City	H	3–0	12,759	Cresswell (2), Healy
14 September 2004	Reading	A	1–3	11,857	Healy
18 September 2004	Sunderland	A	1–3	24,264	Alexander (pen)
25 September 2004	Crewe Alexandra	H	1–0	11,823	Davidson
28 September 2004	Plymouth Argyle	H	1–1	11,445	Cresswell
2 October 2004	Leicester City	A	1–1	21,249	Lonergan
16 October 2004	Leeds United	A	0–1	30,458	
19 October 2004	Queens Park Rangers	H	2–1	10,548	Healy, Cresswell (pen)
23 October 2004	Nottingham Forest	H	3–2	12,439	McKenna, Lucketti, Etuhu
30 October 2004	Ipswich Town	A	0–3	23,745	
3 November 2004	Coventry City	A	1–1	12,478	Lewis
6 November 2004	Leeds United	H	2–4	18,531	Cresswell (2)
13 November 2004	Millwall	H	1–1	10,339	Lewis
19 November 2004	Cardiff City	A	1–0	10,950	Mawéné
27 November 2004	Derby County	H	3–0	12,702	Alexander (2, 1 pen), Cresswell
5 December 2004	Wigan Athletic	A	0–5	10,565	
11 December 2004	Burnley	A	0–2	15,318	
18 December 2004	West Ham United	H	2–1	13,451	Lewis
26 December 2004	Stoke City	A	0–0	20,350	
28 December 2004	Reading	H	3–0	12,795	Agyemang, Hughes (own goal), Lewis
1 January 2005	Sunderland	H	3–2	16,940	Cresswell (3)
3 January 2005	Crewe Alexandra	A	2–1	8,667	Sedgwick, O'Neil
15 January 2005	Leicester City	H	1–1	12,677	McKenna
22 January 2005	Plymouth Argyle	A	2–0	13,663	Sedgwick, Agyemang
5 February 2005	Coventry City	H	3–2	13,691	Alexander (pen), Cresswell, Lucketti
12 February 2005	Queens Park Rangers	A	2–1	15,620	Nugent, Lucketti
18 February 2005	Ipswich Town	H	1–1	14,418	Nugent
23 February 2005	Nottingham Forest	A	0–2	19,209	
26 February 2005	Burnley	H	1–0	18,202	Alexander (pen)
5 March 2005	West Ham United	A	2–1	26,442	Nugent, Agyemang
12 March 2005	Wolverhampton Wanderers	H	2–2	16,296	Cresswell, Alexander (pen)
15 March 2005	Sheffield United	A	1–1	18,647	Cresswell
19 March 2005	Watford	A	2–0	19,649	Nugent, McKenna
2 April 2005	Gillingham	H	1–1	15,054	Brown (own goal)
5 April 2005	Brighton & Hove Albion	H	3–0	14,234	Alexander (pen), Cresswell, Nugent
9 April 2005	Rotherham United	A	2–1	6,312	Sedgwick, Mawéné
16 April 2005	Cardiff City	H	3–0	15,141	Nugent (2), Cresswell
24 April 2005	Millwall	A	1–2	11,417	Nugent
30 April 2005	Wigan Athletic	H	1–1	20,221	O'Neil
8 May 2005	Derby County	A	1–3	31,237	Agyemang

=== Championship play-offs ===
Round	Date	Opponent	Venue	Result	Attendance	Goalscorers
SF 1st Leg	15 May 2005	Derby County	H	2–0	20,315	Nugent, Cresswell
SF 2nd Leg	19 May 2005	Derby County	A	0–0	31,310	
F	30 May 2005	West Ham United	N	0–1	70,275	

=== FA Cup ===
Round	Date	Opponent	Venue	Result	Attendance	Goalscorers
R3	8 January 2005	West Bromwich Albion	H	0–2	13,005	

=== League Cup ===
Round	Date	Opponent	Venue	Result	Attendance	Goalscorers
R1	21 September 2004	Mansfield Town	A	4–0	3,208	Cresswell, Alexander, Daley, Lynch
R2	4 October 2004	Leicester City	A	3–2	6,751	Cresswell (3, 1 pen)
R3	27 October 2004	Everton	A	0–2	33,922	

== Statistics ==
=== Appearances and goals ===
No.	Pos	Nat	Player	Total		Championship		FA Cup		EFL Cup	
No.	Pos	Nat	Player	Apps	Goals	Apps	Goals	Apps	Goals	Apps	Goals
1	GK	(England) ENG	Andy Lonergan	26	1	23	1	1	0	2	0
2	DF	(Scotland) SCO	Graham Alexander	46	8	41+1	7	1	0	3	1
3	DF	(Scotland) SCO	Brian O'Neil	46	3	40+3	3	0	0	3	0
4	MF	(Nigeria) NGR	Dickson Etuhu	39	3	22+13	3	1	0	3	0
5	DF	(Scotland) SCO	Callum Davidson	11	1	6+3	1	0	0	1+1	0
6	DF	(England) ENG	Marlon Broomes	11	0	8+2	0	0	0	1	0
8	MF	(France) FRA	Eric Skora	10	0	5+4	0	0	0	0+1	0
9	FW	(Ghana) GHA	Patrick Agyemang	28	4	15+12	4	1	0	0	0
10	FW	(Northern Ireland) NIR	Andy Smith	17	0	3+11	0	0	0	2+1	0
11	MF	(England) ENG	Chris Sedgwick	25	3	24	3	1	0	0	0
12	GK	(England) ENG	Gavin Ward	8	0	6+1	0	0	0	1	0
14	FW	(Scotland) SCO	Simon Lynch	9	1	2+6	0	0	0	0+1	1
15	DF	(France) FRA	Youl Mawéné	50	2	46	2	1	0	3	0
16	MF	(England) ENG	Paul McKenna	42	3	37+2	3	1	0	2	0
17	MF	(United States) USA	Eddie Lewis	43	4	37+3	4	1	0	2	0
18	DF	(England) ENG	Matt Hill	14	0	11+3	0	0	0	0	0
20	DF	(England) ENG	Chris Lucketti	43	4	41	4	1	0	1	0
21	DF	(Republic of Ireland) IRL	David Elebert	0	0	0	0	0	0	0	0
22	DF	(Jamaica) JAM	Claude Davis	35	0	21+11	0	0	0	3	0
24	DF	(England) ENG	Tyrone Mears	5	0	1+3	0	0+1	0	0	0
25	FW	(England) ENG	Richard Cresswell	49	20	46	16	0	0	3	4
27	MF	(Republic of Ireland) IRL	Alan McCormack	4	0	0+3	0	0	0	0+1	0
30	MF	(Australia) AUS	Kieran Tracey	0	0	0	0	0	0	0	0
31	GK	(England) ENG	Chris Neal	1	0	0+1	0	0	0	0	0
32	FW	(England) ENG	Mark Jackson	6	0	0+2	0	0+1	0	1+2	0
33	GK	(England) ENG	Carlo Nash	7	0	7	0	0	0	0	0
35	FW	(England) ENG	David Nugent	18	8	13+5	8	0	0	0	0
Out on Loan:
26	DF	(England) ENG	Darran Kempson	0	0	0	0	0	0	0	0
28	MF	(England) ENG	Michael Brown	0	0	0	0	0	0	0	0
29	FW	(England) ENG	Joe O'Neill	3	0	0+2	0	1	0	0	0
Player who left during the season:
9	FW	(Jamaica) JAM	Ricardo Fuller	2	1	2	1	0	0	0	0
11	FW	(Northern Ireland) NIR	David Healy	12	5	11	5	0	0	1	0
23	GK	(Scotland) SCO	Jonathan Gould	4	0	4	0	0	0	0	0
30	FW	(England) ENG	Kelvin Langmead	1	0	0+1	0	0	0	0	0
33	MF	(Republic of Ireland) IRL	Ciarán Lyng	0	0	0	0	0	0	0	0
34	DF	(England) ENG	Kyle Armstrong	0	0	0	0	0	0	0	0
Player(s) who featured whilst on loan but returned to parent club during the season:
7	MF	(Jamaica) JAM	Omar Daley	17	1	1+13	0	0	0	1+2	1
9	FW	(Republic of the Congo) CGO	Guylain Ndumbu-Nsungu	6	0	4+2	0	0	0	0	0
18	DF	(England) ENG	John Curtis	12	0	12	0	0	0	0	0
19	MF	(France) FRA	Yoann Folly	2	0	0+2	0	0	0	0	0
19	FW	(Portugal) POR	Filipe Oliveira	5	0	1+4	0	0	0	0	0
33	GK	(England) ENG	Chris Day	6	0	6	0	0	0	0	0
33	DF	(England) ENG	Rob Kozluk	2	0	0+1	0	1	0	0	0
