= Richard Cresswell =

English footballer (born 1977)

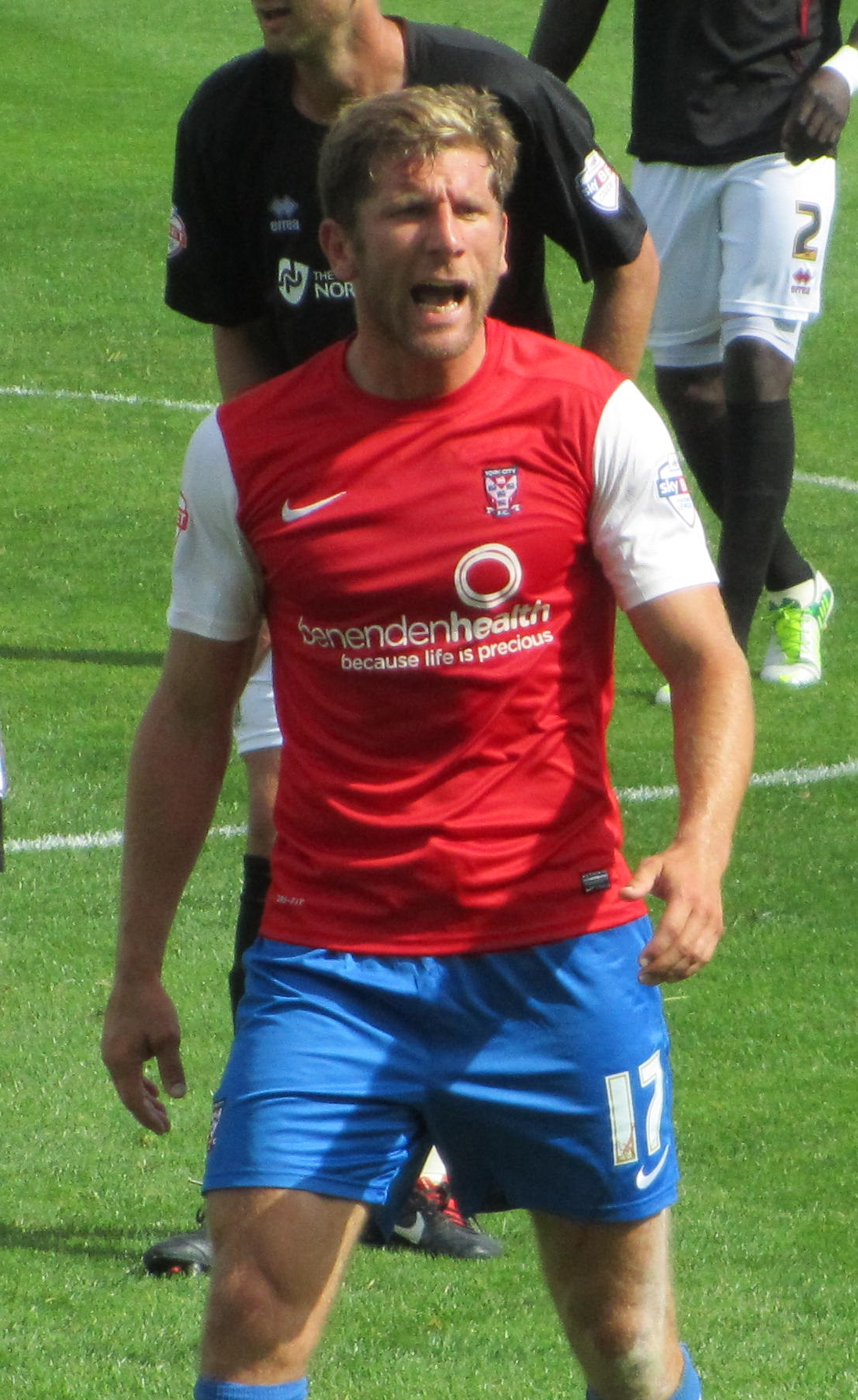
- Cresswell playing for York City in 2013

Personal information
- Full name: Richard Paul Wesley Cresswell
- Date of birth: 20 September 1977 (age 49)
- Place of birth: Bridlington, England
- Height: 6 ft 0 in (1.83 m)
- Position: Striker

Youth career
- 1991–1995: York City

Senior career*
Years	Team	Apps	(Gls)
1995–1999	York City	95	(21)
1997	→ Mansfield Town (loan)	5	(1)
1999–2000	Sheffield Wednesday	31	(2)
2000–2001	Leicester City	8	(0)
2001	→ Preston North End (loan)	11	(2)
2001–2005	Preston North End	176	(46)
2005–2007	Leeds United	38	(9)
2007–2010	Stoke City	75	(11)
2009–2010	→ Sheffield United (loan)	9	(2)
2010–2013	Sheffield United	115	(25)
2013	→ York City (loan)	5	(2)
2013	York City	6	(0)
2016–2017	Tadcaster Albion	0	(0)
Total		574	(121)

International career
1999	England U21	4	(1)

Managerial career
- 2015: York City (caretaker)
- * Club domestic league appearances and goals

Richard Paul Wesley Cresswell (born 20 September 1977) is an English football coach and former professional footballer who played as a striker. He played in the Premier League and Football League for York City, Mansfield Town, Sheffield Wednesday, Leicester City, Preston North End, Leeds United, Stoke City and Sheffield United.

Cresswell started his career with York City in their youth system, making his first-team debut in a Second Division match in 1996. Having scored 19 goals for York in the 1998–99 season, he signed for Premier League club Sheffield Wednesday in 1999. After their relegation the following year, Cresswell joined Leicester City of the Premier League, but was loaned to First Division club Preston North End in 2001 and played for them in the 2001 First Division play-off final. He signed for Preston permanently later that year. He had four full seasons with Preston, scoring a career best 21 goals in 2004–05, which culminated in defeat in the 2005 Championship play-off final. Cresswell signed for Preston's Championship rivals Leeds United in 2005, and endured a number of knee injuries while with them. He missed their defeat in the 2006 Championship play-off final through suspension.

Following Leeds' relegation into League One in 2007, he signed for Championship club Stoke City. He won promotion with them into the Premier League as Championship runners-up in 2007–08, with Cresswell scoring 12 goals. He spent one season in the Premier League with Stoke before joining Championship club Sheffield United on loan in 2009, signing permanently in 2010. United were relegated into League One in 2011, and Cresswell played in their defeat in the 2012 League One play-off final. He was made player-coach at the club in 2012 before rejoining his first club York in 2013, initially on loan. Cresswell retired from playing later that year, before joining York's backroom staff in 2014. He had a short spell as the club's caretaker manager in 2015, and resumed his playing career in non-League football with Tadcaster Albion the following year.

== Early life ==
Cresswell was born in Bridlington, Yorkshire , to George and Denise. He was raised in the town and attended Moorfield Junior School.

== Club career ==
=== York City ===
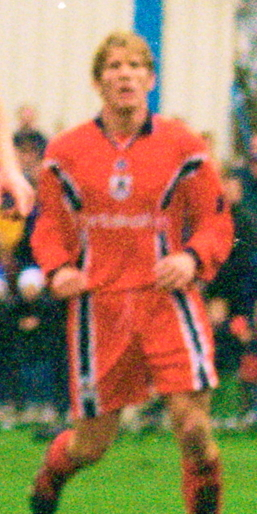
Cresswell playing for York City in 1998

Cresswell started playing for Bridlington Rangers at the age of eight before joining the York City youth system aged 14 in 1991. Having been top scorer for the Northern Intermediate League team for three consecutive seasons, he signed a professional contract on 15 November 1995. Cresswell made his first-team debut away to Brentford in a 2–0 defeat in the Second Division on 20 January 1996. He first scored for York with the second goal of a 2–2 draw away to Bradford City on 2 March 1996. This proved to be his only goal in the 1995–96 season, in which he made 17 appearances.

Having failed to score in 22 appearances for York in 1996–97, Cresswell joined Third Division club Mansfield Town on loan on 27 March 1997, making his debut in a 0–0 draw away to Exeter City on 29 March. He scored his first and only goal for Mansfield in a 1–0 win away to Rochdale on 5 April 1997, before finishing the loan with five appearances. He scored four goals in 30 appearances for York in 1997–98, and during this season he was barracked by a small section of the York support.

Cresswell admitted he had not made the impact he had hoped to in the York first team, but ahead of 1998–99 said "I've had some stick from a small number of fans, but hopefully I can prove them wrong. I will prove them wrong. This a big season for me. I want to do it for York City. I want to do it for myself." After a positive start to the season, Cresswell attracted attention from other clubs, with a number of scouts attending matches to watch him play. Manager Alan Little claimed some clubs were making illegal approaches for the player, and that this was having a detrimental effect on his performances. Preston North End manager David Moyes claimed his club had a bid of more than £500,000 for Cresswell rejected, while York chairman Douglas Craig rejected this, saying a formal offer had not been received from any club. He was York's top scorer in 1998–99 with 19 goals from 42 appearances.

=== Sheffield Wednesday ===
He moved to Premier League club Sheffield Wednesday on a four-year contract on 25 March 1999, with the £950,000 fee being the highest received for a York player. On his transfer, Cresswell said: "This move is no disrespect to York, it's just that I have always wanted to play at a much bigger club and as high as possible". Manager Danny Wilson described Cresswell as "one for the future" after admitting the player "is not the striker people may perceive as the big one we were chasing". His debut came in Wednesday's 2–1 home defeat to Coventry City on 3 April 1999, before scoring his first goal with an 87th-minute winner at home to Liverpool in a 1–0 win on 8 May. He finished 1998–99 with one goal in seven appearances for Wednesday. Cresswell completed 1999–2000 with two goals in 25 appearances, having been given few opportunities in the team, as Wednesday were relegated into the First Division.

=== Leicester City ===
Cresswell struggled to establish himself at Wednesday under manager Paul Jewell early in 2000–01, before he resumed playing in the Premier League after signing for Leicester City on 1 September 2000 for a fee of £750,000. Leicester were managed by Peter Taylor, who previously worked with Cresswell previously in the England national under-21 team. He made his debut in their 1–1 draw at home to Red Star Belgrade in the UEFA Cup on 14 September 2000. He scored once in 13 appearances for Leicester, his goal coming against former club York in a 3–0 home win in the FA Cup third round on 6 January 2001, having failed to establish himself in the team.

=== Preston North End ===
Cresswell joined First Division club Preston North End on loan for the remainder of 2000–01 on 10 March 2001 and scored five minutes into his debut, a 2–0 win at home to Wolverhampton Wanderers (Wolves) on 14 March. He came on as an 82nd minute substitute in their 3–0 defeat to Bolton Wanderers in the 2001 First Division play-off final at the Millennium Stadium on 28 May 2001. After scoring two goals in 14 appearances he signed for Preston permanently on a four-year contract for a fee of £500,000 on 14 July 2001.

Cresswell was Preston's top scorer in his first two permanent seasons with Preston, scoring 15 goals in 44 appearances in 2001–02 and scoring 16 in 46 appearances in 2002–03. He was also named Preston's Player of the Year for 2001–02. He received the first red card of his career in Preston's 4–1 defeat away to Coventry on 17 March 2004 after he was judged to have kicked out at opponent player Calum Davenport, although both managers later admitted David Healy was the culprit. He scored three goals in 47 appearances in 2003–04.

Cresswell drew praise from manager Billy Davies during 2004–05, "Richard is very capable of that and it is important that we keep creating chances for Cressy as we know that he will put the ball in the back of the net", although he admitted the team were over reliant on Cresswell's goals. He enjoyed his best goal return in 2004–05, top scoring for Preston with 21 goals in 52 appearances. This helped Preston reach the 2005 Championship play-off final, where they were beaten 1–0 by West Ham United at the Millennium Stadium. Cresswell played poorly in the first half, but had a number of chances on goal during the second half.

=== Leeds United ===
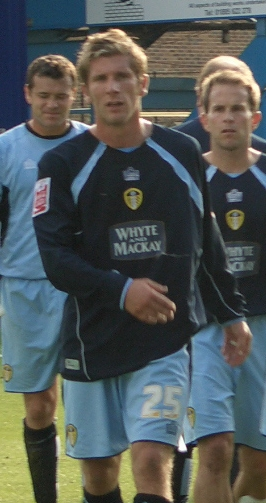
Cresswell playing for Leeds United in 2005

Cresswell was bought by Preston's Championship rivals Leeds United on a four-year contract on 24 August 2005 for a fee of £1.15 million, after rivals Sheffield United had a £1 million bid accepted. After the signing was completed, manager Kevin Blackwell said "To get a player of Cresswell's quality is amazing", while Cresswell cited his desire to win promotion with Leeds. He first found the net with two goals in Leeds' League Cup 2–0 away victory against Rotherham United on 20 September 2005. However, Cresswell suffered knee ligament damage in a match against Derby County eight days later. This injury kept Cresswell out of action for seven weeks, making his return in Leeds' 1–0 defeat away to Wolves on 17 December 2005, and scoring in his second match back against Coventry City in a 3–1 home win on 26 December. Another knee injury picked up during a training session in February 2006 kept him out of the team until he entered Leeds' 1–1 draw with former club Preston in the Championship play-off semi-final first leg as a 78th-minute substitute on 5 May 2006. However, he was sent off in the 2–0 win in the second leg, meaning he was suspended for the 2006 Championship play-off final, which Leeds lost 3–0 to Watford at the Millennium Stadium. He finished 2005–06 with 21 appearances and seven goals for Leeds.

Having damaged his knee ligaments during the play-off semi-final, Cresswell missed the start of 2006–07, making his first appearance in Leeds' 4–0 home defeat to Stoke City on 14 October 2006. However, he sustained a knee injury in November 2006, after scoring his first goal of the season in Leeds' 3–0 home win over Colchester United on 11 November. His return from injury came as a 68th-minute substitute in a 2–1 victory at home to Crystal Palace on 10 February 2007. Cresswell scored in successive matches against Sheffield Wednesday and Luton Town in March 2007, but Leeds were eventually relegated into League One. He finished the season with four goals in 23 appearances.

=== Stoke City ===
Cresswell signed with Championship club Stoke City on a three-year contract for an undisclosed fee on 2 August 2007, after Hull City had pulled out of a deal after expressing concerns following his medical. He made his debut in a 1–0 win at Cardiff City on 11 August 2007, before scoring in his second appearance with an equaliser during stoppage time of extra time in a 2–2 draw away to Rochdale in the League Cup first round on 14 August, although Stoke lost 4–2 in a penalty shoot-out. He scored the last ever goal at Colchester United's Layer Road ground in a 1–0 win. Cresswell made 46 appearances for Stoke in 2007–08, scoring 12 goals, as the club won promotion into the Premier League as Championship runners-up. He was regularly used on the left wing by Stoke manager Tony Pulis, even though his natural position is as a striker. He was quoted as saying he enjoyed playing as a winger, saying "I do my best, and I am quite a fit lad so I get through quite a bit of mileage". During 2008–09, Cresswell played on the wing and as a striker, featuring in 34 matches and scoring one goal.

=== Sheffield United ===
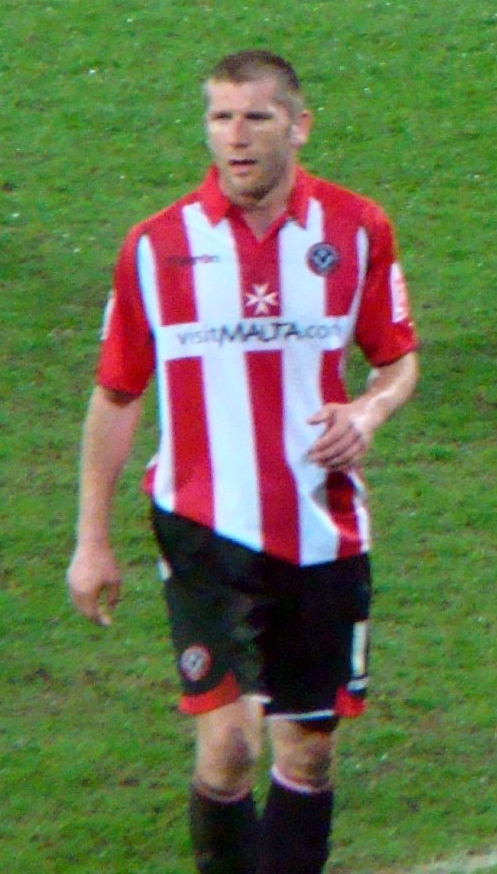
Cresswell playing for Sheffield United in 2010

Having struggled for appearances with Stoke since their promotion into the Premier League, Cresswell joined Championship club Sheffield United on a three-month loan on 29 September 2009 and made his debut the same day as a 76th-minute substitute against Ipswich Town in a 3–3 home draw. Starting the following match, he scored a 65th-minute equaliser against Doncaster Rovers in a 1–1 draw at home on 3 October 2009. He joined United permanently on a one-and-a-half-year contract for an undisclosed fee on 5 January 2010, finishing 2009–10 as top scorer with 14 goals. He was rewarded with a new three-year contract with the club in June 2010. He scored five goals in 36 appearances in 2010–11 as United were relegated into League One.

With United now in League One, Cresswell formed a striking-partnership with Ched Evans, making 51 appearances and scoring 10 goals in 2011–12. The club failed to achieve promotion however, being beaten 8–7 in a penalty shoot-out by Huddersfield Town in the 2012 League One play-off final at Wembley Stadium on 26 May 2012, in which Cresswell was substituted for Chris Porter in the 85th minute. As a result of financial circumstances Cresswell and Nick Montgomery were made available for transfer during August 2012, with manager Danny Wilson explaining that "They were both fit, they were left out for financial reasons". Towards the end of the transfer window however United agreed a revised deal to change his role to that of player-coach and as such he would be remaining at Bramall Lane for the foreseeable future. On his return to the team, Cresswell came on as a substitute and scored a header in United's 5–3 victory over AFC Bournemouth on 1 September 2012.

=== Return to York City ===
Cresswell rejoined his first club York City, playing in League Two, on 19 March 2013 on a one-month loan. He marked his second York debut by scoring a 73rd minute penalty kick on 23 March 2013 away to Torquay United in a 2–1 defeat. He played an important role as York fought against relegation, scoring twice in five appearances, before being recalled by new United caretaker manager Chris Morgan on 15 April 2013. In July 2013, new United manager David Weir stated that Cresswell would be leaving the club, before he signed for York permanently on a one-year contract on 16 July 2013. His first appearance after signing permanently came in the first match of 2013–14, a 1–0 home win over Northampton Town on 3 August 2013. Cresswell retired from playing on 5 December 2013, as a result of an eye complaint and a knee injury. He made eight appearances for York in 2013–14.

== International career ==
Cresswell was called up to the England under-21 team while with York, making his debut in a 2–1 home victory over France in a friendly on 9 February 1999. He continued to play for the under-21s after joining Wednesday, and scored his first goal for them in a 3–0 home win over Sweden in a 2000 UEFA European Under-21 Championship qualification match on 4 June 1999. Cresswell finished his under-21 career with four caps and one goal.

== Coaching career ==
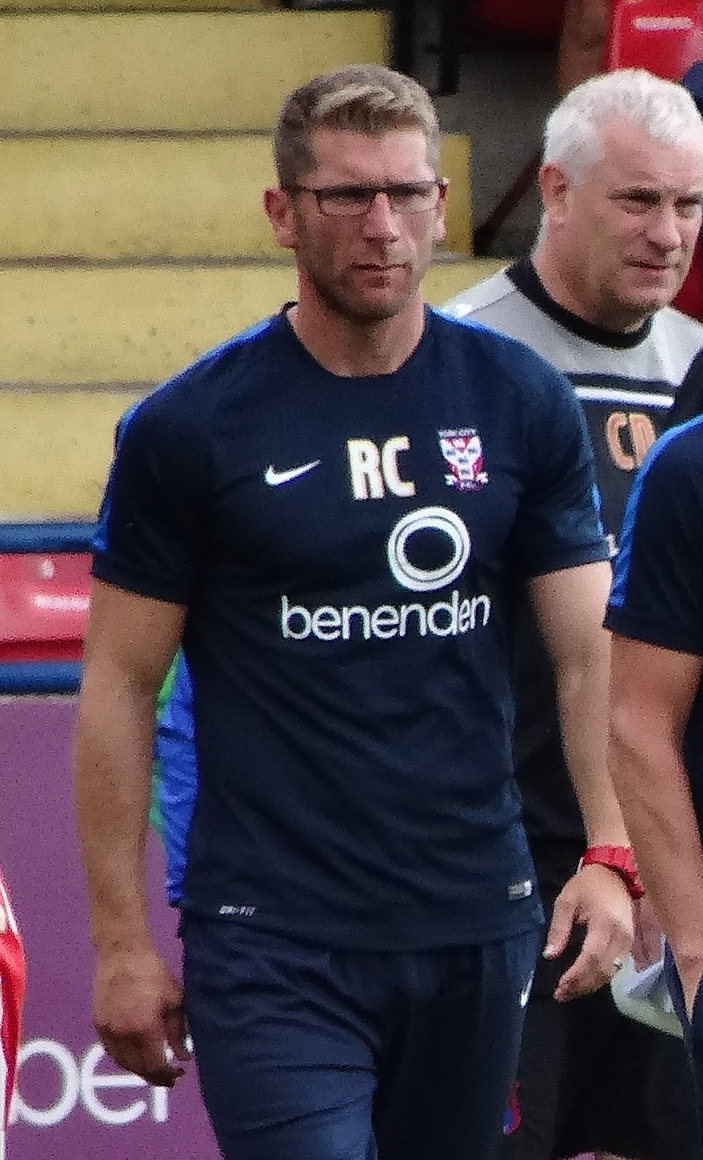
Cresswell as a coach with York City in 2015

Cresswell returned to York as a commercial, academy and community development consultant in April 2014, having previously intended to pursue a career in coaching. He took on the position of Head of Football Operations, before being appointed as first-team coach to manager Russ Wilcox in March 2015. In May 2015, Cresswell resumed his role as Head of Football Operations, while continuing to coach the first team. He took over as caretaker manager on 26 October 2015 after Wilcox's dismissal, and was assisted by youth team coach Jonathan Greening and goalkeeping coach Andy Leaning. He was in charge for the 1–0 away defeat to Crawley Town on 31 October 2015, before ceasing his caretaker duties upon the appointment of Jackie McNamara as manager on 4 November. Cresswell left York by mutual consent on 16 December 2015.

He resumed his playing career aged 38 when signing for Northern Counties East League Premier Division club Tadcaster Albion on 7 April 2016. A week later, he made his only appearance for Tadcaster in 2015–16, when starting their 3–1 away win over Knaresborough Town. He recorded an assist to help them reach the Northern Counties East League League Cup semi-final. In May 2017, Cresswell was appointed technical director at i2i Sports, a player management company, and in this role would work with the management team at Tadcaster.

Cresswell joined Leeds United as Head of Academy Coaching in June 2018, working across age groups from primary school age to under-23 level, and overseeing the implementation of training methods which would align each squad together. He resigned his role and left the club on 9 August 2019.

== Personal life ==
Cresswell married Zoe Chapman at Christ Church, Bridlington, on 7 June 2003, with former York City teammate Jonathan Greening being his joint best man. He participated in a 170-mile bike ride during 2012 to raise money for a charity which helps children with Dravet's syndrome, after his twin nieces were diagnosed with the disorder.

His two sons are also footballers; Charlie played for his former club Leeds United, and Alfie is captain of Leeds United U21.

== Career statistics ==
Appearances and goals by club, season and competition
Club	Season	League			FA Cup		League Cup		Other		Total	
Club	Season	Division	Apps	Goals	Apps	Goals	Apps	Goals	Apps	Goals	Apps	Goals
York City	1995–96	Second Division	16	1	0	0	0	0	1 (Note: Appearance in Football League Trophy)	0	17	1
York City	1996–97	Second Division	17	0	1	0	3	0	1	0	22	0
York City	1997–98	Second Division	26	4	2	0	1	0	1	0	30	4
York City	1998–99	Second Division	36	16	3	3	2	0	1	0	42	19
York City	Total		95	21	6	3	6	0	4	0	111	24
Mansfield Town (loan)	1996–97	Third Division	5	1	—		—		—		5	1
Sheffield Wednesday	1998–99	Premier League	7	1	—		—		—		7	1
Sheffield Wednesday	1999–2000	Premier League	20	1	3	0	2	1	—		25	2
Sheffield Wednesday	2000–01	First Division	4	0	—		—		—		4	0
Sheffield Wednesday	Total		31	2	3	0	2	1	—		36	3
Leicester City	2000–01	Premier League	8	0	2	1	1	0	2 (Note: Appearances in UEFA Cup)	0	13	1
Preston North End (loan)	2000–01	First Division	11	2	—		—		3 (Note: Appearances in First Division play-offs)	0	14	2
Preston North End	2001–02	First Division	40	12	2	2	2	1	—		44	15
Preston North End	2002–03	First Division	42	16	0	0	4	0	—		46	16
Preston North End	2003–04	First Division	45	2	1	1	1	0	—		47	3
Preston North End	2004–05	Championship	46	16	0	0	3	4	3 (Note: Appearances in Championship play-offs)	1	52	21
Preston North End	2005–06	Championship	3	0	—		0	0	—		3	0
Preston North End	Total		187	48	3	3	10	5	6	1	206	57
Leeds United	2005–06	Championship	16	5	2	0	1	2	2	0	21	7
Leeds United	2006–07	Championship	22	4	0	0	1	0	—		23	4
Leeds United	Total		38	9	2	0	2	2	2	0	44	11
Stoke City	2007–08	Championship	43	11	2	0	1	1	—		46	12
Stoke City	2008–09	Premier League	30	0	0	0	4	1	—		34	1
Stoke City	2009–10	Premier League	2	0	—		1	0	—		3	0
Stoke City	Total		75	11	2	0	6	2	—		83	13
Sheffield United	2009–10	Championship	31	12	3	2	—		—		34	14
Sheffield United	2010–11	Championship	35	5	0	0	1	0	—		36	5
Sheffield United	2011–12	League One	42	9	4	0	2	1	3 (Note: One appearance in Football League Trophy, two in League One play-offs)	0	51	10
Sheffield United	2012–13	League One	16	1	3	0	0	0	1	0	20	1
Sheffield United	Total		124	27	10	2	3	1	4	0	141	30
York City (loan)	2012–13	League Two	5	2	—		—		—		5	2
York City	2013–14	League Two	6	0	1	0	0	0	1	0	8	0
York City	Total		11	2	1	0	0	0	1	0	13	2
Tadcaster Albion	2015–16	Northern Counties East League; Premier Division	0	0	—		—		1 (Note: Appearance in Northern Counties East League League Cup)	0	1	0
Tadcaster Albion	2016–17	Northern Premier League; Division One North	0	0	0	0	—		0	0	0	0
Tadcaster Albion	Total		0	0	0	0	—		1	0	1	0
Career total			574	121	29	9	30	11	20	1	653	142

== Managerial statistics ==
As of 4 November 2015

Managerial record by team and tenure
Team	From	To	Record				
Team	From	To	P	W	D	L	Win %
York City (caretaker)	26 October 2015	4 November 2015	1	0	0	1	0.0
Total			1	0	0	1	0.0

== Honours ==
Stoke City

- Football League Championship runner-up: 2007–08

Individual

- Preston North End Player of the Year: 2001–02
