= Joe O'Neill =

English footballer

Personal information
- Full name: Joseph John O'Neill
- Date of birth: 28 October 1982 (age 44)
- Place of birth: Blackburn, England
- Height: 6 ft 0 in (1.83 m)
- Position: Striker

Youth career
- –2001: Preston North End

Senior career*
Years	Team	Apps	(Gls)
2001–2005	Preston North End	2	(0)
2003–2004	→ Bury (loan)	23	(3)
2004	→ Mansfield Town (loan)	15	(0)
2005	→ Chester City (loan)	11	(1)
2005–2006	York City	37	(5)
2006–2009	Altrincham	112	(14)
2009–2010	Stalybridge Celtic	37	(15)
2010–2012	Guiseley	58	(7)
2012–2013	Droylsden	36	(4)
2013–2014	Ashton United	32	(6)
2014–2015	Nelson	42	(19)
Total		405	(74)
- * Club domestic league appearances and goals

Joseph John O'Neill (born 28 October 1982) is an English former footballer who played as a striker. He played in the Football League for Preston North End, Bury, Mansfield Town and Chester City.

== Career ==
Born in Blackburn, Lancashire, O'Neill started his career in the youth system at Preston North End turning professional in the summer of 2001. He suffered an Achilles injury which hampered his early career with the club, however, he did sign a two-year contract extension in 2003. In July 2013, O'Neill joined Football League Third Division side Bury on a season-long loan. He made his professional debut in August 2013, coming on as a substitute for Lee Connell in the Football League Cup defeat to Tranmere Rovers. His league debut for the club came in a 2–1 win over Huddersfield Town. His first professional goal came in the same month, when the Shakers beat York City 2–0. O'Neill made a total of 27 appearances for the club in all competitions scoring three goals. In August 2004, O'Neill joined Football League Two side Mansfield Town on a three-month loan, after impressing on trial. His stay at Field Mill was an unsuccessful one as he failed to score in seventeen appearances and he returned to Preston in November. He made his first team debut for North End in December 2004, coming on as a substitute in a 3–0 win over Reading. He made his only start for the club in a 2–0 defeat to West Bromwich Albion in the FA Cup. In January 2005, O'Neill joined League Two side Chester City on loan for an initial month with the view to a permanent deal. O'Neill scored once during his loan spell against Rushden & Diamonds in eleven appearances.

In the summer of 2005, he was released by Preston and joined Conference National side York City on a free transfer. In August 2005, O'Neill scored a hat-trick on his league debut for York in a 4–1 away win at Southport. He only went on to score twice more throughout the season appearing 38 times in all competitions, before his release in the summer of 2006. O'Neill then signed for fellow Conference National side Altrincham on a free transfer. He featured regularly in his first season with the club with Colin Little as his strike partner, although not prolific he was praised for his excellent work rate and he swept the board at the end of season player of the year awards. In the summer of 2007, O'Neill turned down an offer to join Football League Two side Rotherham United and agreed a new deal with Altrincham. In his next two seasons with the club O'Neill featured heavily from the bench and often playing out of position on the wing. Injuries also hampered his time at the club and he left in the summer of 2009, having made 128 appearances in all competitions scoring nineteen times.

In June 2009, O'Neill dropped down to the Conference North and signed for Stalybridge Celtic. He made his debut in August 2009 in a 4–1 win over Redditch United, scoring his first goal in a 3–1 defeat to Corby Town. It was at Stalybridge where O'Neill enjoyed the best scoring run of his career scoring 21 goals in 45 appearances in his only season with the club. In 2010, O'Neill was on the move again, joining Conference North side Guiseley on a free transfer. His first season for the club was fairly prolific, scoring 17 goals in 51. O'Neill was used more sparingly in his second season with the club featuring mainly on the wing and he failed to score in 35 appearances. He left the club in the summer of 2012, having been told his contract would not be renewed. O'Neill remained in the Conference North with Droylsden for a season, however, he could not help the club escape relegation as the team struggled throughout the campaign. In the summer of 2013, O'Neill dropped down to the Northern Premier League Premier Division with Ashton United, where he joined his brother Matty. O'Neill went on to make 39 appearances for Ashton scoring six times. In February 2014, O'Neill was on the move again, dropping down to North West Counties League First Division side Nelson, joining his brothers Ed and Matty. In his first season with the club he scored an impressive eight goals in ten appearances, as the Admirals gained promotion to the NWCFL Premier Division. In April 2015, O'Neill announced his retirement from football following a 4–1 defeat to 1874 Northwich on the final day of season.

== Personal life ==
O'Neill studied at the University of Salford for a degree in Physiotherapy, graduating in 2009. He is the brother of former Burnley professional footballer Matthew O'Neill, and also Ed O'Neill. In March 2014, the brothers made history in the 8–1 win for Nelson over Widnes Vikings, being the first three siblings to score in the same game in the North West Counties League.

== Career statistics ==
Club statistics
Club	Season	League			FA Cup		League Cup		Other		Total	
Club	Season	Division	Apps	Goals	Apps	Goals	Apps	Goals	Apps	Goals	Apps	Goals
Preston North End	2001–02	First Division	0	0	0	0	0	0	—		0	0
Preston North End	2002–03	First Division	0	0	0	0	0	0	—		0	0
Preston North End	2003–04	First Division	0	0	0	0	0	0	—		0	0
Preston North End	2004–05	Championship	2	0	1	0	0	0	0	0	3	0
Preston North End	Total		2	0	1	0	0	0	0	0	3	0
Bury (loan)	2003–04	Third Division	23	3	1	0	1	0	2 (Note: Appearances in Football League Trophy)	0	27	3
Mansfield Town (loan)	2004–05	League Two	15	0	0	0	0	0	2	0	17	0
Chester City (loan)	2004–05	League Two	11	1	0	0	0	0	0	0	11	1
York City	2005–06	Conference National	37	5	2	0	—		0	0	39	5
Altrincham	2006–07	Conference National	44	7	1	0	—		3 (Note: Two appearances in FA Trophy, one appearance and goal in Cheshire Senior Cup)	1	48	8
Altrincham	2007–08	Conference Premier	42	4	2	0	—		6 (Note: One appearance in FA Trophy, one appearance in Conference League Cup, four appearances and two goals in Cheshire Senior Cup)	2	50	6
Altrincham	2008–09	Conference Premier	26	3	0	0	—		4 (Note: One appearance in FA Trophy, one appearance in Conference League Cup, two appearances and two goals in Cheshire Senior Cup)	2	30	5
Altrincham	Total		112	14	3	0	—		13	5	128	19
Stalybridge Celtic	2009–10	Conference North	37	15	3	3	—		5 (Note: Four appearances and two goals in FA Trophy, one appearance and one goal in Cheshire Senior Cup)	3	45	21
Guiseley	2010–11	Conference North	35	7	5	3	—		11 (Note: Two appearances in Conference North play-offs, six appearances and four goals in FA Trophy, three appearances and three goals in West Riding County Cup)	7	51	17
Guiseley	2011–12	Conference North	23	0	1	0	—		11 (Note: Two appearances in Conference North play-offs, four in FA Trophy, five in West Riding County Cup)	0	35	0
Guiseley	Total		58	7	6	3	—		22	7	86	17
Droylsden	2012–13	Conference North	36	4	1	0	—		0	0	37	4
Ashton United	2013–14	Northern Premier League Premier Division	32	6	3	0	—		4 (Note: One appearance in FA Trophy, two in Northern Premier League Challenge Cup, one in Manchester Premier Cup)	0	39	6
Nelson	2013–14	North West Counties League First Division	8	10	—		—		0	0	8	10
Nelson	2014–15	North West Counties League Premier Division	34	9	1	0	—		3 (Note: One appearance in FA Vase, one in Lancashire FA Challenge Trophy, one in League Challenge Cup)	0	38	9
Nelson	Total		42	19	1	0	—		3	0	46	19
Career total			405	74	21	6	1	0	51	15	478	95

== Honours ==
Nelson

- North West Counties League First Division: 2013–14
