= 2007–08 Stoke City F.C. season =

Stoke City
2007–08 season
- Chairman: Peter Coates
- Manager: Tony Pulis
- Stadium: Britannia Stadium
- Championship: 2nd (79 Points)
- FA Cup: Third Round
- League Cup: First Round
- Top goalscorer: League: Ricardo Fuller (15); All: Ricardo Fuller (15)
- Highest home attendance: 26,309 vs Leicester City (4 May 2008)
- Lowest home attendance: 11,414 vs Queens Park Rangers (27 November 2007)
- Average home league attendance: 16,823
Home colours	Away colours

The 2007–08 season was Stoke City's 101st in the Football League, and the 41st in the second tier.

After last season's narrow miss on a play-off, the objective was to gain an automatic promotion position. But after a poor summer transfer wise supporters wondered what the ambition of the club was. New signings were unknown youngster Ryan Shawcross signed on loan from Manchester United and veteran forward Richard Cresswell, which hardly set the pulses racing but a 1–0 win on the opening match of the season at Cardiff City set the tone for a season to remember. Stoke didn't really perform well in the opening few months and by the middle of November they were in mid-table, but several key loan signings saw Stoke embark on a twelve match unbeaten run.

This pushed Stoke into the top two and after a narrow defeat at Charlton Athletic Stoke won five in a row. However Stoke then hit a poor run of form winning one in their next eight matches. Wins over Coventry City, Bristol City and Colchester United saw Stoke within one point of gaining a promotion, which they would achieve after drawing 0–0 with Leicester City to gain a return to the top flight of English football after a 23-year absence.

== Season review ==
=== League ===
The feeling around the club had improved after last season's success in finishing 8th. The supporters were hoping that the management would bring new quality players as well as making last season's successful loan players moves permanent. But the club were left frustrated as most decided to seek employment elsewhere and by the time the start of the season had come around Stoke had only added Richard Cresswell, Jon Parkin and Ryan Shawcross to their squad. Stoke's first match of the season saw them travel to notoriously hostile Ninian Park to take on Cardiff City. Debutante Ryan Shawcross made a perfect start to his Stoke career scoring the winning goal in a 1–0 win which saw Steve Simonsen save a last minute penalty. A good win against promotion favourites Charlton Athletic followed but a 3–2 defeat at Southampton brought Stoke their first defeat of the season. Three draws against Wolverhampton Wanderers, Hull City and Barnsley failed to get the supporters excited and during the next match against Plymouth Argyle with Stoke 2–1 down, some fans started venting their frustrations at manager Tony Pulis but Stoke went on to win 3–2.

Stoke began to struggle, with poor home defeats to Sheffield Wednesday and then Coventry City prompted Pulis to enter the loan market again and he brought in Leon Cort and Danny Pugh. This enabled Stoke to field a more settled side and they began to display the form they showed from last season and they went twelve matches unbeaten from 24 November 2007 to 19 January 2008. During that run Stoke gained some impressive victories including a 3–0 at Sheffield United and a Ricardo Fuller hat trick against promotion rivals West Bromwich Albion. In the January transfer window Stoke completed the permanent signings of Cort, Pugh and Shawcross whilst former players Andy Griffin and Paul Gallagher made a return and John Eustace joined Watford with Glenn Whelan joining as a replacement.

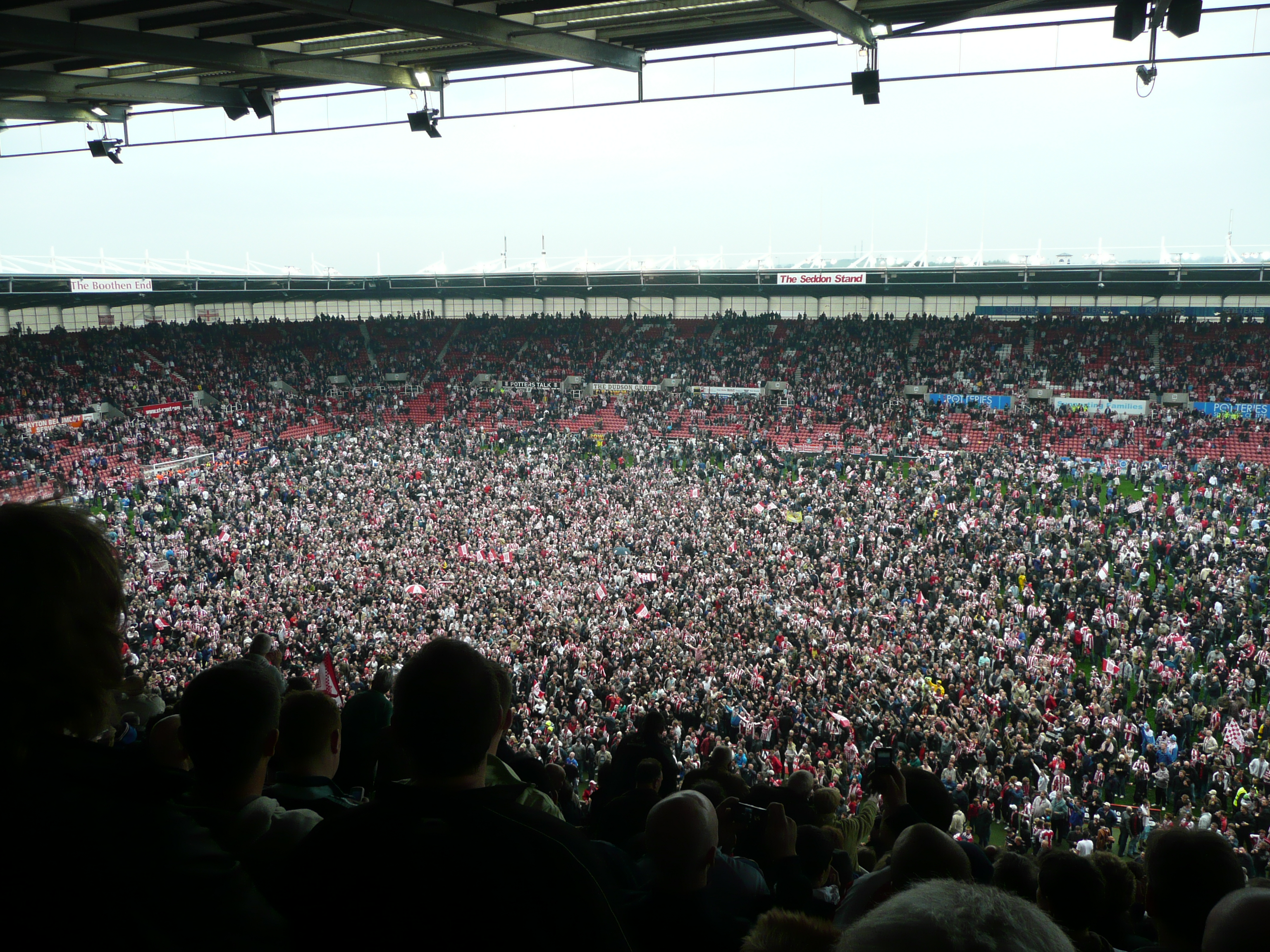
Stoke City fans celebrate following promotion to the Premier League, 4 May 2008

Stoke's twelve match unbeaten run was ended with a 1–0 defeat away at Charlton Athletic. Stoke bounced back brilliantly beating Cardiff 2–1 and Wolverhampton Wanderers 4–2 away at Molineux. Then they beat both Southampton and Scunthorpe United 3–2 and made it five wins in a row with a 1–0 win over Ipswich Town to earn Pulis manager of the month award for February. But Stoke lost their form and managed just one win in their next eight matches until they won against Coventry City with three matches remaining. A Mamady Sidibé double helped Stoke beat promotion rivals Bristol City and ended their efforts to gain automatic promotion leaving just Stoke and Hull fighting for 2nd place with West Bromwich Albion looking to have sealed top spot. For the penultimate match of the season Stoke travelled to Colchester United who had already being relegated. However it was not an easy match as Colchester were playing their final match at Layer Road, Cresswell scored the only goal as Stoke almost secured promotion but for a late winner for Hull. This took the promotion race to the final match of the season against relegation threatened Leicester City. In a tense and cagey 90 minutes the scored remained goalless and Stoke took the point they needed to gain promotion to the Premier League and a return to the top flight of English football for 23 years.

=== FA Cup ===
Stoke drew struggling Premier League side Newcastle United in the third round, the match ended in a goalless draw with Stoke creating the better chances. In the replay Newcastle had appointed Kevin Keegan as manager and he inspired the "Magpies" to a 4–1 victory.

=== League Cup ===
For a fourth season in a row Stoke made a first round exit to League Two opposition this time to Rochdale, losing 4–2 on penalties after a 2–2 in normal and extra time.

== Final league table ==
Pos	Team	Pld	W	D	L	GF	GA	GD	Pts	Promotion, qualification or relegation
1	West Bromwich Albion (C, P)	46	23	12	11	88	55	+33	81	Promotion to the Premier League
2	Stoke City (P)	46	21	16	9	69	55	+14	79	Promotion to the Premier League
3	Hull City (O, P)	46	21	12	13	65	47	+18	75	Qualification for Championship play-offs
4	Bristol City	46	20	14	12	54	53	+1	74	Qualification for Championship play-offs
5	Crystal Palace	46	18	17	11	58	42	+16	71	Qualification for Championship play-offs

Updated to match(es) played on 4 May 2008. Source: The Football League
Rules for classification: 1) points; 2) goal difference; 3) number of goals scored.
(C) Champions; (O) Play-off winners; (P) Promoted

== Results ==
Stoke's score comes first

=== Legend ===
Win	Draw	Loss

=== Pre-season friendlies ===
Match	Date	Opponent	Venue	Result	Attendance	Scorers	Report
1	15 July 2007	Newcastle Town	A	5–1	1, 996	Fuller 7', 25', Péricard 60', Lawrence 65', Garrett 80'	Report
2	20 July 2007	Macclesfield Town	A	1–1		Parkin 35'	Report
3	24 July 2007	SV Bad Aussee	A	2–1		Pulis 35', Péricard 37'	Report
4	27 July 2007	Real Madrid	N	0–2			Report
5	1 August 2007	Aston Villa	H	0–2	7,503		Report
6	5 August 2007	Tranmere Rovers	A	1–2		Higginbotham 77'	Report

=== Football League Championship ===
Match	Date	Opponent	Venue	Result	Attendance	Scorers	Report
1	11 August 2007	Cardiff City	A	1–0	18,840	Shawcross 27'	Report
2	18 August 2007	Charlton Athletic	H	2–1	12,649	Fuller 57', Parkin 78'	Report
3	25 August 2007	Southampton	A	2–3	20,300	Fuller 10', Parkin 82'	Report
4	1 September 2007	Wolverhampton Wanderers	H	0–0	17,135		Report
5	15 September 2007	Hull City	A	1–1	19,642	Delap 44'	Report
6	18 September 2007	Barnsley	H	0–0	13,071		Report
7	22 September 2007	Plymouth Argyle	H	3–2	12,533	Seip (o.g.) 10', Fuller 66', Lawrence 73'	Report
8	29 September 2007	Leicester City	A	1–1	23,654	Fuller 15'	Report
9	3 October 2007	West Bromwich Albion	A	1–1	20,048	Shawcross 27'	Report
10	6 October 2007	Colchester United	H	2–1	12,395	Shawcross 8', Lawrence 73'	Report
11	20 October 2007	Sheffield Wednesday	H	2–4	14,019	Fuller (2) 12', 41'	Report
12	23 October 2007	Crystal Palace	A	3–1	14,237	Cresswell (2) 49', 59', Shawcross 74'	Report
13	27 October 2007	Bristol City	A	0–1	15,012		Report
14	3 November 2007	Coventry City	H	1–3	13,448	Lawrence 72' (pen)	Report
15	6 November 2007	Scunthorpe United	A	3–2	5,521	Cresswell 26', Hayes (o.g.) 88', Lawrence 90'	Report
16	10 November 2007	Sheffield United	H	0–1	12,158		Report
17	24 November 2007	Burnley	A	0–0	11,758		Report
18	27 November 2007	Queens Park Rangers	H	3–1	11,147	Cresswell 5', Lawrence 19', Cort 77'	Report
19	1 December 2007	Norwich City	H	2–1	19,258	Cort 46', Cresswell 89'	Report
20	4 December 2007	Sheffield United	A	3–0	23,378	Cresswell 2', Beattie (o.g.) 7', Shawcross 19'	Report
21	9 December 2007	Watford	H	0–0	15,516		Report
22	15 December 2007	Blackpool	A	3–2	9,123	Fuller (2) 37', 61', Cort 41'	Report
23	22 December 2007	West Bromwich Albion	H	3–1	18,420	Fuller (3) 5', 38', 66'	Report
24	26 December 2007	Barnsley	A	3–3	12,398	Lawrence (3) 31', 84', 90+8' (2 pen)	Report
25	28 December 2007	Plymouth Argyle	A	2–2	13,692	Cresswell 8', Shawcross 57'	Report
26	1 January 2008	Hull City	H	1–1	15,788	Cort 33'	Report
27	12 January 2008	Ipswich Town	A	1–1	20,346	Fuller 33'	Report
28	19 January 2008	Preston North End	H	3–1	15,011	Cort (2) 16', 72', Cresswell 28'	Report
29	29 January 2008	Charlton Athletic	A	0–1	22,108		Report
30	2 February 2008	Cardiff City	H	2–1	15,045	Johnson (o.g.) 39', Fuller (pen) 57'	Report
31	9 February 2008	Wolverhampton Wanderers	A	4–2	25,373	Delap 4', Lawrence 49', Cort 74', Fuller 90'	Report
32	12 February 2008	Southampton	H	3–2	19,481	Powell (o.g.) 27', Shawcross 35', Sidibé 44'	Report
33	15 February 2008	Scunthorpe United	H	3–2	20,979	Lawrence (2) 53', 63', Cresswell 67'	Report
34	23 February 2008	Ipswich Town	H	1–0	23,563	Lawrence 42'	Report
35	26 February 2008	Preston North End	A	0–2	12,789		Report
36	2 March 2008	Queens Park Rangers	A	0–3	13,398		Report
37	8 March 2008	Burnley	H	1–1	18,432	Lawrence 90' (pen)	Report
38	11 March 2008	Norwich City	A	1–0	23,471	Sidibé 58'	Report
39	15 March 2008	Watford	A	0–0	18,388		Report
40	22 March 2008	Blackpool	H	1–1	20,019	Cort 47'	Report
41	29 March 2008	Sheffield Wednesday	A	1–1	21,857	Cresswell 21'	Report
42	7 April 2008	Crystal Palace	H	1–2	15,756	Whelan 85'	Report
43	12 April 2008	Coventry City	A	2–1	20,249	Lawrence 55', Fuller 79' (pen)	Report
44	19 April 2008	Bristol City	H	2–1	24,475	Sidibé (2) 14', 36'	Report
45	26 April 2008	Colchester United	A	1–0	6,300	Cresswell 45'	Report
46	4 May 2008	Leicester City	H	0–0	26,609		Report

=== FA Cup ===
Round	Date	Opponent	Venue	Result	Attendance	Scorers	Report
R3	6 January 2008	Newcastle United	H	0–0	22,861		Report
R3 Replay	16 January 2008	Newcastle United	A	1–4	35,108	Lawrence 89'	Report

=== League Cup ===
Round	Date	Opponent	Venue	Result	Attendance	Scorers	Report
R1	14 August 2007	Rochdale	A	2–2 (2–4 pens)	2,369	Shawcross 4', Cresswell 120'	Report

== Squad statistics ==
No.	Pos.	Name	League		FA Cup		League Cup		Total		Discipline	
No.	Pos.	Name	Apps	Goals	Apps	Goals	Apps	Goals	Apps	Goals	Yellow card	Red card
1	GK	(England) Steve Simonsen	35(1)	0	2	0	0	0	37(1)	0	1	0
2	DF	(England) Andy Griffin (c)	15	0	0	0	0	0	15	0	1	1
3	DF	(England) Marlon Broomes	0	0	0	0	0	0	0	0	0	0
4	MF	(England) John Eustace	20(6)	0	2	0	1	0	23(6)	0	4	0
5	DF	(England) Leon Cort	33	8	2	0	0	0	35	8	0	0
6	DF	(England) Clint Hill	4(1)	0	0	0	0	0	4(1)	0	1	0
6	MF	(Republic of Ireland) Glenn Whelan	13(1)	1	0	0	0	0	13(1)	1	2	0
7	MF	(Republic of Ireland) Liam Lawrence	40(1)	14	2	1	1	0	43(1)	15	12	0
8	FW	(England) Jon Parkin	4(25)	2	1(1)	0	1	0	6(26)	2	1	0
9	FW	(England) Richard Cresswell	42(1)	11	2	0	0(1)	1	44(2)	12	10	0
10	FW	(Jamaica) Ricardo Fuller	39(3)	15	2	0	0	0	41(3)	15	10	0
11	FW	(Mali) Mamady Sidibé	33(2)	4	1	0	1	0	35(2)	4	1	0
12	MF	(Scotland) Peter Sweeney	0(5)	0	0	0	0(1)	0	0(6)	0	1	0
12	FW	(Nigeria) Shola Ameobi	3(3)	0	0	0	0	0	3(3)	0	2	0
14	DF	(England) Danny Higginbotham	1	0	0	0	1	0	2	0	0	0
14	MF	(England) Danny Pugh	27(3)	0	2	0	0	0	29(3)	0	5	0
15	FW	(France) Vincent Péricard	2(3)	0	0(1)	0	0	0	2(4)	0	0	0
16	DF	(Scotland) Dominic Matteo	14	0	0	0	0	0	14	0	2	0
17	DF	(England) Ryan Shawcross	39(2)	7	2	0	1	1	42(2)	8	10	0
18	MF	(Senegal) Salif Diao	8(3)	0	0(1)	0	0	0	8(4)	0	1	0
19	DF	(England) Stephen Wright	14(2)	0	0	0	1	0	15(2)	0	3	0
19	FW	(Scotland) Paul Gallagher	2(5)	0	0	0	0	0	2(5)	0	1	0
20	DF	(Belgium) Ritchie De Laet	0	0	0	0	0	0	0	0	0	0
21	DF	(Democratic Republic of the Congo) Gabriel Zakuani	11(8)	0	1	0	0	0	12(8)	0	1	0
22	DF	(England) Lewis Buxton	0(4)	0	0	0	0	0	0(4)	0	1	0
23	DF	(England) Jody Craddock	4	0	0	0	0	0	4	0	0	0
24	MF	(Republic of Ireland) Rory Delap	44	2	1	0	1	0	46	2	7	0
25	GK	(England) Russell Hoult	1	0	0	0	1	0	2	0	0	1
26	MF	(Wales) Anthony Pulis	0(1)	0	0(2)	0	1	0	1(3)	0	0	0
27	MF	(Jamaica) Demar Phillips	0(2)	0	0	0	0	0	0(2)	0	0	0
28	DF	(England) Andy Wilkinson	16(7)	0	1	0	0(1)	0	17(8)	0	3	0
29	FW	(England) Jay Bothroyd	1(3)	0	0	0	0	0	1(3)	0	0	0
30	DF	(England) Ryan Shotton	0	0	0	0	0	0	0	0	0	0
31	DF	(England) Carl Dickinson	19(8)	0	1(1)	0	1	0	21(9)	0	3	0
32	DF	(England) Chris Riggott	9	0	0	0	0	0	9	0	0	0
33	MF	(Scotland) Stephen Pearson	3(1)	0	0	0	0	0	3(1)	0	0	0
34	FW	(Republic of Ireland) Adam Rooney	0	0	0	0	0	0	0	0	0	0
35	MF	(Northern Ireland) Robert Garrett	0	0	0	0	0	0	0	0	0	0
36	GK	(Hungary) Márton Fülöp	0	0	0	0	0	0	0	0	0	0
36	GK	(England) Carlo Nash	10	0	0	0	0	0	10	0	0	0
37	MF	(Northern Ireland) Matthew Hazley	0	0	0	0	0	0	0	0	0	0
39	MF	(England) Nathaniel Wedderburn	0	0	0	0	0	0	0	0	0	0
–	–	Own goals	–	5	–	0	–	0	–	5	–	–

== Transfers ==
=== In ===
Date	Pos.	Name	From	Fee	Ref.
20 June 2007	FW	(England) Jon Parkin	(England) Hull City	£275,000	
3 August 2007	FW	(England) Richard Cresswell	(England) Leeds United	Undisclosed	
17 August 2007	DF	(Belgium) Ritchie De Laet	(Belgium) Royal Antwerp	£100,000	
31 August 2007	MF	(Jamaica) Demar Phillips	(Jamaica) Waterhouse	Undisclosed	
10 December 2007	MF	(Senegal) Salif Diao	(England) Liverpool	Free	
3 January 2008	MF	(England) Danny Pugh	(England) Preston North End	£500,000	
10 January 2008	DF	(England) Andy Griffin	(England) Derby County	£300,000	
14 January 2008	DF	(England) Leon Cort	(England) Crystal Palace	£1.200,000	
18 January 2008	DF	(England) Ryan Shawcross	(England) Manchester United	£1.000,000	
30 January 2008	MF	(Republic of Ireland) Glenn Whelan	(England) Sheffield Wednesday	£500,000	

=== Loan in ===
Date from	Date to	Pos.	Name	From	Ref.
3 August 2007	30 June 2008	DF	(England) Stephen Wright	(England) Sunderland	
3 August 2007	1 January 2008	DF	(England) Ryan Shawcross	(England) Manchester United	
17 August 2007	19 September 2007	DF	(England) Jody Craddock	(England) Wolverhampton Wanderers	
31 August 2007	30 June 2008	DF	(Democratic Republic of the Congo) Gabriel Zakuani	(England) Fulham	
2 November 2007	1 January 2008	MF	(England) Danny Pugh	(England) Preston North End	
2 November 2007	1 January 2008	DF	(England) Leon Cort	(England) Crystal Palace	
31 January 2008	30 June 2008	MF	(Scotland) Paul Gallagher	(England) Blackburn Rovers	
22 February 2008	26 February 2008	GK	(Hungary) Márton Fülöp	(England) Sunderland	
29 February 2008	30 June 2008	DF	(England) Chris Riggott	(England) Middlesbrough	
4 March 2008	30 June 2008	GK	(England) Carlo Nash	(England) Wigan Athletic	
14 March 2008	30 June 2008	FW	(England) Jay Bothroyd	(England) Wolverhampton Wanderers	
27 March 2008	30 June 2008	FW	(Nigeria) Shola Ameobi	(England) Newcastle United	
28 March 2008	30 June 2008	MF	(Scotland) Stephen Pearson	(England) Derby County	

=== Out ===
Date	Pos.	Name	To	Fee	Ref.
18 June 2007	MF	(Hungary) Ádám Vass	(Italy) Brescia	Compensation	
4 July 2007	FW	(Northern Ireland) Martin Paterson	(England) Scunthorpe United	Compensation	
9 July 2007	FW	(Scotland) Kevin Harper	(Scotland) Dunfermline Athletic	Free	
30 July 2007	MF	(England) Darel Russell	(England) Norwich City	Free	
7 August 2007	DF	(Belgium) Carl Hoefkens	(England) West Bromwich Albion	£750,000	
14 August 2007	FW	(Guinea) Sambégou Bangoura	(Portugal) Boavista	£200,000	
10 January 2008	MF	(Scotland) Peter Sweeney	(England) Leeds United	Undisclosed	
18 January 2008	DF	(England) Clint Hill	(England) Crystal Palace	Undisclosed	
31 January 2008	MF	(England) John Eustace	(England) Watford	£250,000	
