= Paul McKenna (footballer) =

British footballer (born 1977)

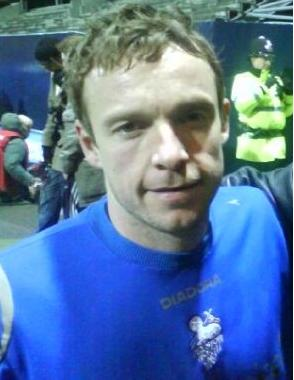
- McKenna in 2009

Personal information
- Full name: Paul Stephen McKenna
- Date of birth: 20 October 1977 (age 49)
- Place of birth: Eccleston, England
- Height: 1.70 m (5 ft 7 in)
- Position: Midfielder

Youth career
- 1992–1996: Preston North End

Senior career*
Years	Team	Apps	(Gls)
1996–2009	Preston North End	418	(30)
2009–2011	Nottingham Forest	67	(3)
2011–2013	Hull City	50	(0)
2013	→ Fleetwood Town (loan)	15	(0)
2014–2015	Bamber Bridge	1	(0)
2016	Longridge Town	1	(0)
Total		552	(33)
- * Club domestic league appearances and goals

Paul Stephen McKenna (born 20 October 1977) is an English former professional footballer.

== Career ==
=== Preston North End ===
Born in Eccleston, Lancashire, after making his debut in 1997 he soon became a fixture in the Preston North End first team. His appearance tally was 427 at the end of the 2007–08 season. This puts him at number nine in the all-time record appearances for the club. He has worn the number 16 shirt since squad numbers were adopted by the Football League.

The 2006–07 season ended in disappointment for the Chorley-born player, not only at missing out on the Play-offs but at missing the last two months of the season with a groin problem. However, he recovered from the injury in time to make a first-team return in October 2007, and was named club captain in one of Paul Simpson's last acts as manager. McKenna has missed just one game since being handed the captain's armband.

McKenna scored the winning penalty in the penalty shoot-out of the 2000–01 Division One play-off semi-final second leg between Preston and Birmingham City at Deepdale, which saw the Lilywhites head to the Millennium Stadium for the final.

McKenna was voted PFA Player of the Season at the end of the 2004–05 season after 35 appearances and 3 goals.

He signed a new three-and-a-half-year contract with Preston in November 2005.

=== Nottingham Forest ===
McKenna signed for Nottingham Forest on a three-year contract for a fee of £750,000 on 20 July 2009. He was immediately installed as club captain.

On 19 December 2009, McKenna scored his first goal for Forest against former club Preston with a 25-yard shot into the bottom left hand corner. However, he refused to celebrate the goal, showing restraint as a mark of respect to the Preston fans. Forest went on to win the game 3–0.

=== Hull City ===
==== 2011–12 ====
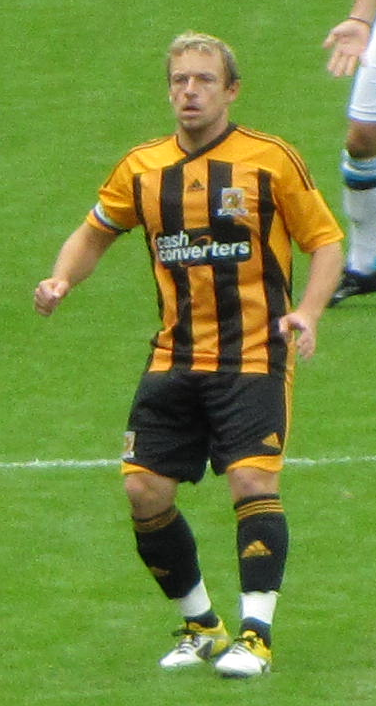
McKenna playing for Hull City in 2011

On 1 July 2011, following speculation that he may rejoin his former employers Preston North End, McKenna joined Hull City on a two-year contract on a free transfer. He made his debut in the first game of the season on 5 August 2011 at the KC Stadium in the 0–1 defeat to Blackpool. McKenna enjoyed a strong season as a regular in central midfield in the club's push for promotion.

==== 2012–13 ====
McKenna was sent off on 27 August 2012 in a League Cup game against Doncaster for kicking out at Doncaster's Rob Jones. For the remainder of his time at Hull he was mainly named as a substitute by manager Steve Bruce.

On 25 January 2013 McKenna was loaned to Fleetwood Town for the remainder of the 2012–13 season.

On 16 May 2013, Hull City announced that McKenna, along with 11 others would be free to leave the KC stadium, as they prepared for their first season back in the Premier League.

=== Bamber Bridge ===
McKenna signed for Northern Premier League side Bamber Bridge on a free transfer in September 2014. He retired in December 2015.

=== Longridge Town ===
In January 2016 McKenna took up a coaching role at Longridge Town alongside former Preston North End teammate Lee Ashcroft. McKenna played in one fixture but said his main priority is coaching.

== Career statistics ==
Appearances and goals by club, season and competition
Club	Season	League			FA Cup		League Cup		Other		Total	
Club	Season	Division	Apps	Goals	Apps	Goals	Apps	Goals	Apps	Goals	Apps	Goals
Preston North End	1996–97	Second Division	4	1	0	0	0	0	0	0	4	1
Preston North End	1997–98	Second Division	5	0	0	0	0	0	0	0	5	0
Preston North End	1998–99	Second Division	36	0	2	1	1	0	2 (Note: Appearances in Football League Trophy)	0	41	1
Preston North End	1999–2000	Second Division	23	2	2	1	5	0	1	0	31	3
Preston North End	2000–01	First Division	44	5	1	0	2	0	3 (Note: Appearances in First Division/Championship play-offs)	0	50	5
Preston North End	2001–02	First Division	38	4	2	0	1	0	―		41	4
Preston North End	2002–03	First Division	41	3	1	0	3	0	―		45	3
Preston North End	2003–04	First Division	39	6	3	0	0	0	―		42	6
Preston North End	2004–05	Championship	39	3	1	0	2	0	3	0	45	3
Preston North End	2005–06	Championship	39	2	2	0	1	0	2	0	46	2
Preston North End	2006–07	Championship	33	2	3	0	1	0	―		37	2
Preston North End	2007–08	Championship	33	0	3	0	0	0	―		36	0
Preston North End	2008–09	Championship	44	2	1	0	2	0	2	0	49	2
Preston North End	Total		418	30	21	2	25	0	13	0	477	32
Nottingham Forest	2009–10	Championship	35	1	1	0	3	0	2	0	41	1
Nottingham Forest	2010–11	Championship	32	2	1	0	1	0	1	0	35	2
Nottingham Forest	Total		67	3	2	0	4	0	3	0	76	3
Hull City	2011–12	Championship	41	0	1	0	1	0	―		43	0
Hull City	2012–13	Championship	10	0	1	0	2	0	―		13	0
Hull City	Total		50	0	2	0	3	0	―		55	0
Fleetwood Town (loan)	2012–13	League Two	15	0	―		―		―		15	0
Career total			550	33	25	2	32	0	16	0	623	35

== Honours ==
Preston North End

- Football League Second Division: 1999–2000

Individual

- PFA Fans' Player of the Year: 2004–05 Championship
