= Marlon Broomes =

English footballer (born 1977)

Personal information
- Full name: Marlon Charles Broomes
- Date of birth: 28 November 1977 (age 48)
- Place of birth: Birmingham, England
- Position: Centre-back

Youth career
- 1992–1994: Blackburn Rovers

Senior career*
Years	Team	Apps	(Gls)
1994–2001	Blackburn Rovers	31	(1)
1997	→ Swindon Town (loan)	12	(1)
2000	→ Queens Park Rangers (loan)	5	(0)
2001	→ Grimsby Town (loan)	15	(0)
2001–2002	Sheffield Wednesday	19	(0)
2002–2005	Preston North End	69	(0)
2005–2008	Stoke City	37	(2)
2008–2009	Blackpool	1	(0)
2009	→ Crewe Alexandra (loan)	8	(0)
2009	→ Crewe Alexandra (loan)	11	(0)
2009–2011	Tranmere Rovers	36	(1)
2011–2012	Clitheroe	21	(0)
2012	Altrincham	9	(1)
Total		253	(6)

International career
1997	England U20	2	(0)
1997	England U21	2	(0)
- * Club domestic league appearances and goals

Marlon Charles Broomes (born 28 November 1977) is an English former professional footballer who played as a centre-back from 1994 to 2012.

He also played as a sweeper (leading to his nickname of "Broomes, the sweeper"), although he could play at left-back as well. He began his career in 1994 with Premier League club Blackburn Rovers, he was part of the squad that went on to win the title in the 1994–95 season but didn't play a match all season. Whilst with Rovers he spent time on loan with Swindon Town, Queens Park Rangers and Grimsby Town. In September 2001 he notably scored the equaliser in Grimsby's 2–1 victory over Liverpool in the League Cup third round. He later went on to join Sheffield Wednesday permanently before moving on to Preston North End, Stoke City, Blackpool, Crewe Alexandra and Tranmere Rovers. He dropped out of the professional game at the end of the 2010–11 season where he signed for Clitheroe. His stay with the club was brief and he moved back up the leagues by joining Conference North side Altrincham. He left Alty at the conclusion of the 2011–12 season. In 1997 whilst a Blackburn player, Broomes was capped twice each by the England U20 and England U21 sides.

== Club career ==
=== Blackburn Rovers ===
Broomes started his career as a trainee at Blackburn Rovers. He was signed up by then Rovers manager Kenny Dalglish on 1 August 1994, but at first he could not break into a strong first team at Ewood Park. On 22 January 1997 he was loaned out to Swindon Town where he made twelve appearances and scored once against Birmingham City in a two-month loan spell.

In the 1997–98 season new Rovers manager Roy Hodgson gave the defender five appearances in the first team. In the following two years he made twenty-six appearances. In the 2000–01 season, he was loaned out again, this time to Queens Park Rangers in October 2000 where he made five appearances in a one-month loan spell. After falling out of favour under new manager Graeme Souness, on 7 September 2001 he was loaned out to Grimsby Town for three months, where he played eighteen times and scored in a 2–1 away win over holders Liverpool in the League Cup. He had scored his first goal for Grimsby in the previous round against Sheffield United. He then returned to Blackburn and following their promotion back to the Premier League in the 2001–02 season, Broomes was released on a free transfer on 12 December 2001.

=== Sheffield Wednesday ===
Broomes signed for Sheffield Wednesday, who at the time were in the First Division, on 13 December 2001. At Wednesday he made 18 league appearances, scoring one goal, but was released at the end of the 2001–02 season.

=== Preston North End ===
Broomes then spent most of the pre-season at Championship club Burnley. However, on 7 August 2002 he signed for Lancashire rivals and fellow Championship club, Preston North End. Manager Craig Brown was impressed with Broomes and signed him on a three-year contract. He played sixty-nine league games for the club in a three-year spell.

=== Stoke City ===
In August 2005, he signed a three-year contract with fellow Championship club, Stoke City in a swap deal which involved Lewis Neal moving from Stoke to Preston. Broomes played in 42 games, mainly at full-back, not his natural position, and scored twice as the club finished in 13th place in the 2005–06 season.

He ruptured his achilles tendon prior to the start of the 2006–07 season and spent the entire season on the sidelines as a result. He played his first game for over twelve months on 10 August 2007 in a 1–0 friendly win against Alsager Town. However, he made no appearances in the 2007–08 season and following the club's promotion to the Premier League, he was released by the club at the end of the season.

=== Blackpool ===
On 4 June 2008, Broomes agreed to join Championship club Blackpool. He joined them officially on 1 July on a twelve-month contract with an option for a further year. However, after making just one late substitute appearance for the Seasiders in September, he joined League One club Crewe Alexandra on 26 January 2009, on loan for one month. He made his debut the following day in a 4–2 defeat to Peterborough United at London Road Stadium. On 23 February the loan deal was extended by a further month. However, on 6 March, after playing eight games for the Alex, Broomes was recalled by Blackpool, because of injuries, and the following day was an unused substitute in the Seasiders 2–0 victory over Norwich City at Bloomfield Road. He was also an unused substitute, three days later as Blackpool drew 2–2 with Sheffield United at Bramall Lane. On 13 March, he returned to Crewe on loan until 2 May and, the following day played in their 1–0 win over Colchester United at the Colchester Community Stadium.

=== Tranmere Rovers ===
On 9 June 2009, Blackpool confirmed that Broomes had not been offered a new deal and that he was being released. On 8 August 2009, it was confirmed that Broomes had joined Tranmere Rovers on a non-contract basis. On 11 August 2009, Broomes made his Tranmere debut in the first round of the League Cup against his former club Grimsby Town where he had been on loan back 2001, Broomes along with his new teammates beat his former club 4–0, and booked a place in the second round of the League Cup. Broomes signed a permanent contract with Tranmere on 1 September 2009; a deal that will run until June 2010. Broomes scored his first goal for Tranmere in a 2–1 win over Southampton on 6 March 2010. After an impressive second half of the season under Les Parry, Marlon Broomes was offered a new one-year deal at Prenton Park.

=== Clitheroe ===
At the end of the 2010–11 season he was not offered a new contract by the club. He joined Conference National side Stockport County on trial during pre-season but was not offered a contract by manager Dietmar Hamann. On 29 August 2011, Broomes signed for Northern Premier League club Clitheroe.

=== Altrincham ===
He signed for Altrincham on 9 January 2012, making his debut against Hinckley United. He went off injured just before the half hour mark. He made his full debut on 18 February against Blyth Spartans and scored in a 2–1 win. He was released by the club at the end of the season having scored one goal in his nine first-team appearances.

== International career ==
Broomes played for the England under-19s. He was called up into the England-under-21 setup in the 1997–98 season. He played twice for the Under 21s. He took part in the 1997 FIFA World Youth Championship, playing two games as the England Under-20 team got to the quarter-finals of the tournament.

== Personal life ==
Broomes is now a football consultant for Murdock Sports Group. His son Ethan Broomes who is also a Centre Half has signed as a scholar at Nottingham Forest Football Club.

== Career statistics ==
Appearances and goals by club, season and competition
Club	Season	League			FA Cup		League Cup		Other^{[A]}		Total	
Club	Season	Division	Apps	Goals	Apps	Goals	Apps	Goals	Apps	Goals	Apps	Goals
Blackburn Rovers	1996–97	Premier League	0	0	0	0	0	0	—		0	0
Blackburn Rovers	1997–98	Premier League	4	0	0	0	1	0	—		5	0
Blackburn Rovers	1998–99	Premier League	13	0	4	0	0	0	0	0	17	0
Blackburn Rovers	1999–2000	First Division	13	1	0	0	0	0	—		13	1
Blackburn Rovers	2000–01	First Division	1	0	0	0	2	0	—		3	0
Blackburn Rovers	2001–02	Premier League	0	0	0	0	0	0	—		0	0
Blackburn Rovers	Total		31	1	4	0	2	0	0	0	37	1
Swindon Town (loan)	1996–97	First Division	12	1	0	0	0	0	—		12	1
Queens Park Rangers (loan)	2000–01	First Division	5	0	0	0	0	0	—		5	0
Grimsby Town (loan)	2001–02	First Division	15	0	0	0	3	2	—		18	2
Sheffield Wednesday	2001–02	First Division	19	0	1	0	0	0	—		20	0
Preston North End	2002–03	First Division	28	0	1	0	3	0	—		32	0
Preston North End	2003–04	First Division	30	0	1	0	0	0	—		31	0
Preston North End	2004–05	Championship	11	0	1	0	0	0	2	0	14	0
Preston North End	Total		69	0	3	0	3	0	2	0	77	0
Stoke City	2005–06	Championship	37	2	4	0	1	0	—		42	2
Stoke City	2006–07	Championship	0	0	0	0	0	0	—		0	0
Stoke City	2007–08	Championship	0	0	0	0	0	0	—		0	0
Stoke City	Total		37	2	4	0	1	0	—		42	2
Blackpool	2008–09	Championship	1	0	0	0	0	0	—		1	0
Crewe Alexandra (loan)	2008–09	League One	19	0	0	0	0	0	0	0	19	0
Tranmere Rovers	2009–10	League One	31	1	3	0	1	0	0	0	35	1
Tranmere Rovers	2010–11	League One	5	0	1	0	0	0	1	0	7	0
Tranmere Rovers	Total		36	1	4	0	1	0	1	0	42	1
Altrincham	2011–12	Conference North	9	1	0	0	—		0	0	9	1
Career total			253	6	15	0	10	2	3	0	281	8

A. The "Other" column constitutes appearances and goals in the Football League play-offs, Football League Trophy.
