= Michael Keane (footballer, born 1982) =

Irish footballer

Personal information
- Full name: Michael Thomas Joseph Keane
- Date of birth: 29 December 1982 (age 43)
- Place of birth: Dublin, Ireland
- Position: Midfielder

Youth career
- 1999–2000: Preston North End

Senior career*
| Years | Team | Apps | (Gls) |
| 2000–2004 | Preston North End | 57 | (3) |
| 2003 | → Grimsby Town (loan) | 7 | (2) |
| 2004–2005 | Hull City | 20 | (3) |
| 2005 | → Rotherham United (loan) | 10 | (0) |
| 2005–2007 | Rotherham United | 50 | (0) |
| 2007–2008 | St Patricks Athletic | 16 | (2) |
| Total | | 160 | (10) |

International career
| 2002 | Republic of Ireland U20 | 3 | (0) |
| 2001–2002 | Republic of Ireland U21 | 4 | (0) |
- * Club domestic league appearances and goals

Michael Thomas Joseph Keane (born 29 December 1982) is an Irish former professional footballer who played on the left side of midfield. He played as a professional from 2000 until 2008, turning out for Preston North End, Grimsby Town, Hull City and Rotherham United before ending his career when he was released by League of Ireland Premier Division team St Patrick's Athletic in 2008.

== Playing career ==
=== Preston North End ===
Keane was born in Dublin. He started his career in 2000 at Preston North End, part of a decent youth team under David Moyes that helped strengthen the club's position in the First Division. Keane made his debut against Blackburn in April 2001 wearing the number 38 shirt which, due to the surprise of his inclusion in the matchday squad, was two sizes too big for him. He would feature again a few days later in Preston's final game of the season at home to West Brom but took no part in Preston's playoff campaign which ultimately led to defeat in the final Vs Bolton.

Despite featuring and scoring his first Preston goal in August 2001, Keane came to prominence in the second half of the 2001–02 season as Preston's playoff seeking campaign began to falter, especially after the departure of manager David Moyes to Everton. Keane rotated in centre-midfield alongside Dickson Etuhu and Paul McKenna and scored his second goal away at Bradford in 0–1 win. Keane would finish the season with 22 appearances and two goals in all competitions.

In contrast the 2002-03 was a disappointing one as Keane made only one start for Preston before breaking his foot. Upon return to fitness manager Craig Brown, who had a wealth of midfielders to choose from, made Keane available for loan and he joined fellow First Division side Grimsby Town on the transfer deadline day in March 2003. Joining The Mariners with the hope of saving them from relegation, Keane performed well scoring two goals but was unable to prevent Grimsby being relegated. Despite interest from Grimsby in signing Keane on a permanent basis, he returned to Deepdale following the end of the season and returned to first team action for Preston.

Keane began 2003/04 as a first choice midfielder alongside Dickson Etuhu as, despite poor early form, Preston climbed into the playoffs with just two defeats in 20 games. Unfortunately once in the playoff position, Preston's form disintegrated and they ended the season fighting a relegation battle rather than a promotion one. Keane would command a regular place in the matchday squad until he was replaced by fellow Irishman and Preston youth product, Alan McCormack. Keane ended the season with 32 appearances and a solitary goal to his name. Despite his highest number of games yet, Keane was told in the summer of 2004 he was surplus to requirements and could leave Deepdale.

=== Hull City ===
After four years and over 50 games at Preston, Keane signed for Hull City for £500,000 in June 2004, saying "It's dropping down a division, but I look at it as a stepping stone. I think this is a club that's definitely on the up", and was part of an impressive squad that was put together at the Yorkshire club. However, he started only twelve games during the 2004–05 season and with no future at the club, he was loaned out to Rotherham United for one month in March 2005.

=== Rotherham United ===
After impressing during his loan spell at Millmoor, Keane signed for the club permanently on a two-year contract. He featured extensively for Rotherham during the 2005–06 season until an operation on a hernia condition in November 2005 ruled him out for several weeks. Later in the season, after returning from the operation, he was sent off against Tranmere in April 2006, leading to a five-match ban that ruled him out for the rest of the season. He was later charged with persistent misconduct by the Football Association having been sent off three times during the season. He was released at the end of the 2006–07 season following the relegation of Rotherham from League One.

=== St Patricks Athletic ===
Following his release he signed with St Patricks Athletic where he remained for one season and played in the UEFA Cup. In the 2008 season he made only two substitute league appearances and in July 2008, he was unlawfully sacked and discriminated against by the club who called him overweight. The following month it was ruled the club were wrong to sack him. In December 2008, Dundalk offered him a contract, but Keane opted to do his uefa coaching badges where he received UEFA A and B Badges.

== Coaching career ==
Keane moved into coaching for O'Deveney Dunard in the Athletic Union League before replacing Anto Brennan as manager when Brennan moved on. He later took over at Stella Maris Under 15s before leaving a few months later.

Keane then had a stint with Brendanville, followed by his appointment at Dingle United FC as their AUL Premier B manager. He left in April 2015. In May 2015 he took over at Hardwicke FC as 1st Team Manager. He led them to promotion to the top flight of amateur football for the first time in the club's history. Keane decided to part ways the following season leaving his assistant in charge. It was believed to be for personal reasons.

== Personal life ==
In April 2025, Keane was jailed for two and a half years for sexually assaulting a woman in his taxi.
