= Kelham O'Hanlon =

English footballer (born 1962)

Personal information
- Full name: Kelham Gerard O'Hanlon
- Date of birth: 16 May 1962 (age 64)
- Place of birth: Saltburn-by-the-Sea, England
- Height: 6 ft 1 in (1.85 m)
- Position: Goalkeeper

Senior career*
Years	Team	Apps	(Gls)
1982–1985	Middlesbrough	87	(0)
1985–1991	Rotherham United	248	(0)
1991–1993	Carlisle United	83	(0)
1993–1994	Preston North End	23	(0)
1994–1996	Dundee United	30	(0)
1996–2003	Preston North End	14	(0)
Total		485	(0)

International career
1987	Republic of Ireland	1	(0)
1983	Republic of Ireland U21	2	(0)

Managerial career
- 2002: Preston North End (caretaker)
- 2009–2011: AFC Fylde
- 2020–: Southern Soccer Academy
- * Club domestic league appearances and goals

Kelham Gerard O'Hanlon (born 16 May 1962) is a former professional footballer who played as a goalkeeper for a number of British clubs. Born in England, he played for the Republic of Ireland national team at international level. He is the head coach of SSA Kings in USL League Two.

== Club career ==
O'Hanlon began his playing career at Middlesbrough in 1982. He then joined Rotherham in 1985 and stayed there for six years, before leaving for Carlisle. Two years later he joined Preston although he was only at Deepdale for one season before joining Dundee United in Scotland. He returned to Preston in 1996, making a further fourteen performances.

== International career ==
During his playing career O'Hanlon gained a cap for the Republic of Ireland national team in 1987, keeping a clean sheet in a 5–0 friendly win over Israel.

== Coaching and managerial career ==
Upon retirement from playing O'Hanlon joined the coaching staff at Preston becoming David Moyes' assistant in 1998. He was made caretaker manager in March 2002 after Moyes' departure to Everton, Moyes offered O'Hanlon a position with Everton but he chose to remain at Deepdale, initially as caretaker manager and subsequently as a permanent appointment. In June 2003, O'Hanlon left Preston due to cost-cutting measures and was appointed as a coach at Bury in January 2004, leaving in May 2005, again due to cost-cutting measures. O'Hanlon took up a part-time position in February 2006 with Chester before being appointed as coach at Barnsley in January 2007 where he remained until September 2009 when manager Simon Davey was sacked.

He was appointed first team manager at non-league club AFC Fylde in December 2009 having been assisting as first team coach for three months prior to this. He left the club in October 2011.

He is the head coach of Southern Soccer Academy Kings in USL League Two.

== Honours ==
Rotherham United

- Football League Fourth Division: 1988–89

Individual

- PFA Team of the Year: 1991–92 Fourth Division

== See also ==
- List of Republic of Ireland international footballers born outside the Republic of Ireland
