= Éric Skora =

French footballer (born 1981)

Éric Skora (born 20 August 1981) is a French former professional footballer.

Skora, a midfielder, began his career at AS Nancy before joining English club Preston. He also played for Walsall during a (on loan) spell and last played for Kilmarnock in the Scottish Premier League.

Skora was something of a cult hero among Kilmarnock fans, after impressing during a loan spell in 2004. Although he wished to stay with the club, Preston recalled him and Kilmarnock did not have sufficient funds to buy the player. However, when Skora was freed from his Preston contract in January 2006, Kilmarnock signed him on a permanent contract. An injury picked up in a reserve team match against Inverness CT hampered his second spell at the club. His only appearance in this second spell was as a late substitute in a 3–1 victory against Heart of Midlothian in October 2007.

Skora retired from football on February 14, 2008 due to a succession of injuries and lack of fitness.
