= Chris Lucketti =

English footballer (born 1971)

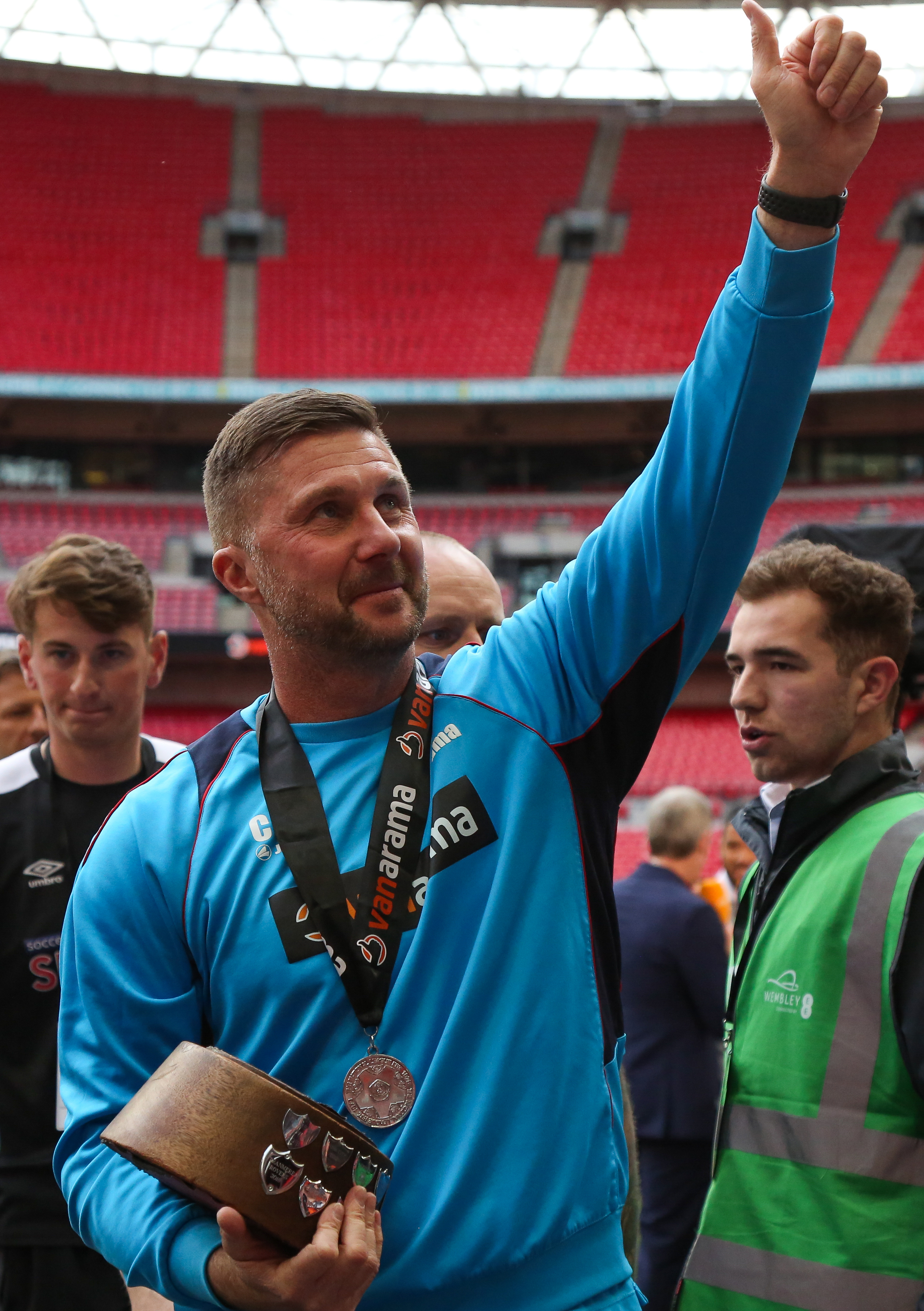
- Lucketti with Salford City at Wembley in 2019

Personal information
- Full name: Christopher James Lucketti
- Date of birth: 28 September 1971 (age 55)
- Place of birth: Littleborough, Lancashire, England
- Position: Centre-back

Team information
- Current team: Preston North End (Assistant Manager)

Youth career
- Rochdale

Senior career*
Years	Team	Apps	(Gls)
1989–1990	Rochdale	1	(0)
1990–1991	Stockport County	0	(0)
1991–1993	Halifax Town	86	(3)
1993–1999	Bury	235	(8)
1999–2001	Huddersfield Town	68	(1)
2001–2006	Preston North End	189	(11)
2006	→ Sheffield United (loan)	3	(0)
2006–2008	Sheffield United	14	(0)
2008	→ Southampton (loan)	4	(0)
2008–2010	Huddersfield Town	13	(0)
Total		613	(23)

Managerial career
- 2015: Fleetwood Town (caretaker)
- 2017–2018: Bury
- * Club domestic league appearances and goals

Christopher James Lucketti (born 28 September 1971) is an English football manager and former professional player, who is assistant manager of EFL Championship club Preston North End.

He played as a centre-back. In a playing career of over 600 games, Lucketti began his career at home town club Rochdale in 1989 before moving to Halifax Town, Bury - for whom he made over 250 appearances - Preston North End, Huddersfield Town and Sheffield United.

After his playing career ended, Lucketti moved into coaching and management with roles including assistant manager at Scunthorpe United, Salford City, Motherwell and Milton Keynes Dons, working alongside Graham Alexander, caretaker manager of Fleetwood Town and manager at Bury.

== Playing career ==
=== Halifax Town, Bury and Huddersfield Town ===
Born in Littleborough, Lancashire, Lucketti started his professional career with Halifax Town where he made 78 Football League appearances before their relegation to the Football Conference in the 1992–93 season. He made a further eight league appearances the following campaign, before joining Bury in October 1993. He made a total of 235 league appearances for the Shakers, winning back-to-back promotions in the 1995–96 and 1996–97 seasons.

In 1999, he joined Huddersfield Town and made 76 appearances for the Terriers, scoring twice, against Scunthorpe United in the League Cup and Crystal Palace in the league.

=== Preston North End ===
Lucketti moved to Preston North End in a £750,000 deal from Huddersfield at the start of the 2001–02 season. He played over 200 times for the Deepdale club. In the 2004–05 season, he formed formidable partnerships with both Claude Davis and Youl Mawene in the Preston defence, helping his team to the play-off final at Millennium Stadium in Cardiff.

=== Sheffield United ===
In March 2006, Lucketti joined Sheffield United for the remainder of the 2005–06 season, making three first-team appearances before signing a one-year deal on 1 June 2006 with the Blades with both clubs agreeing to a fee of £250,000.

Lucketti made his first-team debut for the Blades whilst on loan, appearing in the 1–1 home draw with Leeds United on 18 April 2006.

On 13 January 2007, he made his Premiership debut at the age of 35 against Portsmouth and went on to make a handful of Premiership appearances over the rest of the season. In July 2007, after being linked with a moved to Hull City, he signed a new one-year contract. Despite being re-signed by newly appointed manager Bryan Robson, he featured even less for the Blades under the new boss. He scored what turned out to be his only United goal in the League Cup against MK Dons on 28 August 2007.

On 27 March 2008, he signed on loan until the end of the season for Southampton, making four appearances for the Saints. Under the terms of his loan deal he was eligible to play in the final game of the season between Sheffield United and Southampton, a match which both sides desperately needed to win to try to finish in the play-offs and to avoid relegation respectively, but Lucketti opted to declare himself unavailable for the match to avoid a conflict of interests.

=== Return to Huddersfield ===
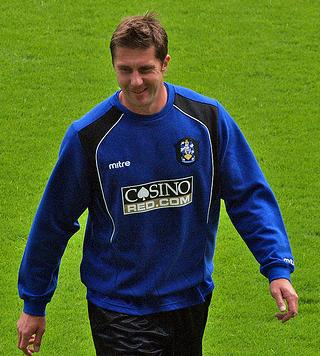
Lucketti with Huddersfield Town in 2008

On 4 July 2008, Lucketti signed a two-year deal at Football League One side Huddersfield Town, seven years after leaving them to join Preston North End. He returned on a free transfer after Sheffield United agreed to cancel the last year of his contract. The following day, he was appointed club captain of the Terriers. He made his second Town debut in the 1–1 draw against Stockport County at the Galpharm Stadium on 9 August 2008. On 25 October, he was sent off in a league match against Peterborough United, where Town lost 4–0. He didn't reappear in the Town first team until 28 February 2009, when he came on as a substitute in the 1–1 draw against Stockport at Edgeley Park.

After being left out of Lee Clark's squad for the whole of the 2009—10 season, he left the club on 17 May 2010.

== Coaching and managerial career ==
=== Fleetwood Town ===
Lucketti moved into coaching and management with youth roles at Preston North End then as assistant manager working alongside Graham Alexander at Fleetwood Town. After Alexander's dismissal. Lucketti was asked to stay on as caretaker manager, becoming assistant manager again on the appointment of Steven Pressley in October 2015.

=== Scunthorpe United ===
In June 2016, Lucketti moved to work with Alexander again at Scunthorpe United with the team finishing third in League One in 2016-17.

=== Bury ===
On 22 November 2017, Lucketti was approached to become manager at Bury replacing Lee Clark. When Lucketti took over, Bury were in the relegation zone and suffering from a number of injuries His contract, along with that of assistant Joe Parkinson, was terminated by the club on 15 January 2018

=== Salford City ===
After working with Graham Alexander as assistant manager at both Fleetwood and Scunthorpe, Lucketti was appointed his assistant manager for a third time at Salford City in May 2018 During their time at Salford, Alexander and Lucketti reached the EFL Trophy final and achieved back to back promotions before their departure in the early part of the 2020-21 season.

=== Motherwell ===
On 8 January 2021, Lucketti was announced as assistant manager of Motherwell alongside Graham Alexander with whom he was worked at a number of clubs.

=== Milton Keynes Dons ===
On 27 May 2023, Lucketti once again linked up with Alexander as his new assistant head coach at Milton Keynes Dons.

=== Bradford City ===
On 6 November 2023, Alexander and Lucketti were announced as the new manager and assistant manager at Bradford City.

=== Preston North End ===
On 28 September 2026, Lucketti once again linked up with Alexander, joining Preston North End as his assistant manager

== Managerial statistics ==
As of match played 13 January 2018

Managerial record by team and tenure
Team	From	To	Record				
Team	From	To	P	W	D	L	Win %
Fleetwood Town (caretaker)	30 September 2015	6 October 2015	2	1	0	1	50.0
Bury	21 November 2017	15 January 2018	10	1	1	8	10.0
Total			12	2	1	9	16.7

== Honours ==
=== Player ===
Bury

- Football League Second Division: 1996–97
- Football League Third Division third-place promotion: 1995–96

Individual

- Bury Player of the Season: 1994–95, 1995–96, 1996–97
