= Dickson Etuhu =

Nigerian footballer (born 1982)

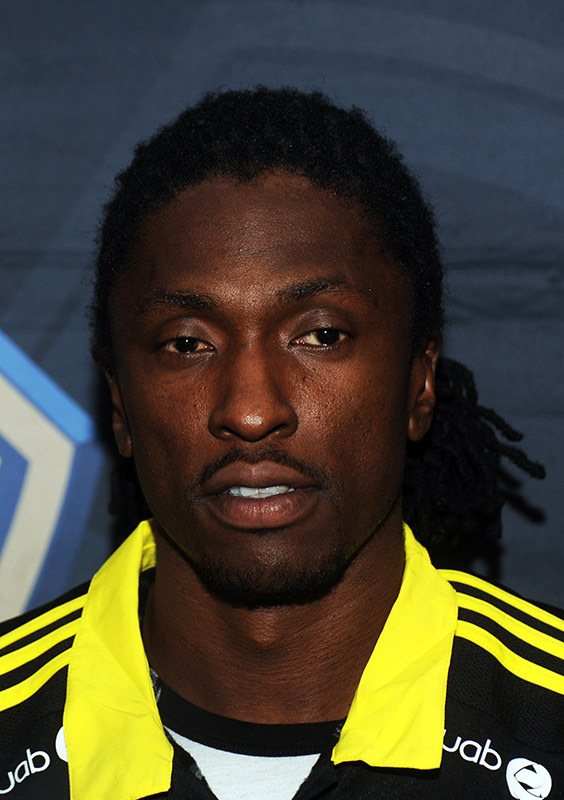

Personal information
- Full name: Dickson Paul Etuhu
- Date of birth: 8 June 1982 (age 44)
- Place of birth: Kano, Nigeria
- Height: 1.92 m (6 ft 4 in)
- Position: Defensive midfielder

Senior career*
Years	Team	Apps	(Gls)
2000–2002	Manchester City	12	(0)
2002–2006	Preston North End	134	(17)
2005–2006	→ Norwich City (loan)	8	(0)
2006–2007	Norwich City	54	(6)
2007–2008	Sunderland	20	(1)
2008–2012	Fulham	91	(3)
2012–2014	Blackburn Rovers	23	(1)
2015–2016	AIK	23	(2)
2017	IFK Rössjöholm	2	(0)
Total		367	(30)

International career
2007–2011	Nigeria	19	(0)
- * Club domestic league appearances and goals as of 30 November 2018

Dickson Paul Etuhu (born 8 June 1982) is a Nigerian former professional footballer who played as a defensive midfielder.

He played in the Premier League for Manchester City, Sunderland and Fulham, as well as in the Football League for Preston North End, Norwich City and Blackburn Rovers. He spent the final two years of his career playing in Sweden with AIK and IFK Rössjöholm. He was capped 19 times by Nigeria between 2007 and 2011.

In November 2019 he was found guilty of match fixing by a Swedish court, and said he would appeal. Both Defence and Prosecution said they would appeal the sentence. In June 2020, Etuhu was handed a five-year ban from football in Sweden.

== Club career ==
=== Early career ===
Etuhu was born in Kano. He started his professional career with Manchester City but made only 11 appearances for the club. He signed for Preston North End in January 2002 for £300,000 as David Moyes' side looked to improve from their playoff final defeat to Bolton the season before. Etuhu made his debut in a 1–0 victory at Bradford City and scored his first goal for the club in a 4–2 victory over Sheffield Wednesday a week later. Etuhu became a regular in the Preston side, playing alongside Sean Gregan in centre midfield replacing the injured Mark Rankine. He would go on to score two more goals in the 2001–02 season as Preston ultimately fell short of the playoffs losing manager David Moyes to Everton in March.

Preston began 2002–03 season under the stewardship of new manager Craig Brown and whilst Etuhu was initially first choice in midfield, he soon found himself in and out of the side as Preston struggled to find consistency. Etuhu made 38 appearances in all competitions, adding to his goal tally as Preston finished the season in 12th. Preston's patchy form continued into 2003–04 as their impressive attack was let down by a poor backline despite a number of personnel changes. Etuhu again found himself, along with a number of other Preston players, in and out of the starting eleven as Brown looked to find his best side. Etuhu was reduced to 26 appearances as Preston finished 15th following a poor second half of the season which had seen them in danger of relegation and for the second season running, exit the FA Cup to Third Division opposition as they lost 2–1 to Swansea.

2004–05 saw Preston reach their second playoff final in four years but despite beginning the season in Preston's midfield, Etuhu would only play a bit part in the campaign. Manager Craig Brown was sacked in August 2004 and replaced with assistant Billy Davies whose indifferent start resulted in Etuhu being relegated to the bench as Davies preferred a centre-midfield of Brian O'Neil and Paul McKenna alongside wingers Chris Sedgwick and Eddie Lewis. As Preston's formed picked up Etuhu found himself out of the matchday squad altogether but as the side closed in on the playoffs he returned to the bench making substitute appearances in the last seven games including the 1–0 play-off final defeat to West Ham at Cardiff.

In August 2005 Etuhu began his third season in a row in the Preston midfield but indifferent form and the signings of Adam Nowland and David Jones meant he was again reduced to substitute appearances. By December 2005 Etuhu began to consider his future away from Deepdale as he repeatedly failed to make the matchday squad and in January 2006 he signed for Norwich on loan for the rest of the 2005–06 season. With Preston failing to include a clause to prevent Etuhu playing against his parent club his first game for Norwich was strangely against the Lilywhites at Carrow Road. During the match Etuhu all but sealed the end of his career at Deepdale with a clumsy challenge that broke Preston midfielder Adam Nowland's leg, an injury that would all but end Nowland's footballing career.

=== Norwich City ===
Norwich City signed him during the January transfer window for £450,000 after a loan deal initially brought him to the club. His form began to improve towards the end of the season and in the early stages of the 2006–07 campaign.

Etuhu scored his first goal for Norwich in a 2–0 win against Torquay United in a League Cup match on 23 August 2006, and got his first league goal for the club in a 3–3 draw at Southend United on 12 September 2006. On 21 October 2006, he scored the only goal in a 1–0 win against Cardiff at Carrow Road to help his new manager Peter Grant win his first home game after replacing Nigel Worthington.

It was incorrectly reported during September 2006 that following the 3–1 defeat at Plymouth Argyle, Etuhu and teammate Youssef Safri traded punches on the team bus on their return journey to East Anglia.

=== Sunderland ===
Etuhu signed for newly promoted Sunderland in a deal worth £1.5 million in the summer of 2007. On 9 February 2008, Etuhu scored his first goal for Sunderland in their home match against Wigan. It came from a free kick floated in by Dean Whitehead, opening the scoring in the 2–0 defeat of the Latics.

=== Fulham ===
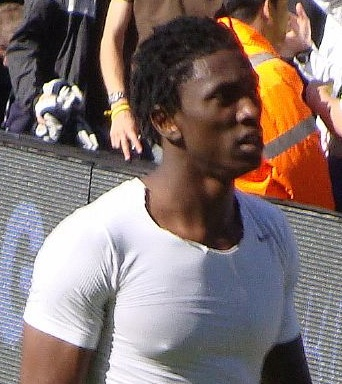
Etuhu at Fulham in 2009

On 29 August 2008, Etuhu announced that he was having a medical with Premier League side Fulham, before joining for a fee of around £1.5 million on a three-year contract at Craven Cottage. Etuhu scored his first goal for Fulham on Easter Sunday 2009 in a game against his former club Manchester City in the 59th minute to put Fulham up 2–1 after a goal from American Clint Dempsey in the 50th minute.

He scored his first goal in European Competition, and his first goal at Craven Cottage, the week after his first son was born with a header to put Fulham 1–0 up against Lithuanian team FK Vetra. On 28 August 2010, Etuhu rescued his team in a match vs. Blackpool, by scoring in the 87th minute in a 2–2 draw at Bloomfield Road. On 18 September 2010, Etuhu played against Blackburn Rovers at Ewood Park in a 1–1 draw. In September 2010, Etuhu, signed a three-year contract extension, which will see him contracted to Craven Cottage until summer 2014. He made his 50th Premier League appearance for them against Newcastle United, in a 0–0 draw on 13 November, when he replaced Zoltan Gera, in the 69th minute in the game at St James' Park. Etuhu scored his fifth goal in Fulham colours when he netted the second in a 6–2 victory over Peterborough United on 8 January 2011 in the FA Cup 3rd round. On 5 March he started and completed the full 90 minutes in a 3–2 win over Blackburn. On 3 April, he scored on 72 minutes thanks to an assist from defender Brede Hangeland in the defeat 3–0 of Blackpool at Craven Cottage. On 9 April, he started in the 2–0 loss against Manchester United at Old Trafford before being replaced on 67 minutes by Zoltán Gera.

On 3 August 2012, Fulham announced that Etuhu had left the club to join Danny Murphy at Blackburn Rovers.

=== Blackburn Rovers ===
On 3 August 2012, Etuhu joined Blackburn Rovers on a four-year deal for an undisclosed fee. He scored his first goal for Blackburn on 29 September 2012 against Charlton Athletic.

=== AIK ===
On 23 December 2014, it was announced that he was acquired by the Swedish AIK of Allsvenskan as a free agent on a two-year deal. His first three starts came in the domestic cup 2014–15 Svenska Cupen, where he managed to get a yellow card in every game. He missed the start of the regular season with an injury.

=== IFK Rössjöholm ===
On 6 August 2017, Etuhu signed a contract with Swedish 5 division club IFK Rössjöholm.

== International career ==
It was announced in late September 2007 that Etuhu had been called up to play for his country on 14 October. He first played in two friendlies for his country and he then made his competitive international debut in the African Cup of Nations in January 2008. Etuhu was part of the Nigeria squad for the 2010 World Cup held in South Africa. He turned down a callup in August 2011 as a replacement player and stated he would not play for Nigeria coach Samson Siasia, temporarily ending his international career. He was however recalled in November 2011 for a pair of friendlies under new coach Stephen Keshi.

== Personal life ==
His younger brother Kelvin is also a footballer. He grew up in Peckham, south London, but then, the family moved to Manchester for Etuhu to pursue his professional ambitions with City.

=== Match fixing ===
In November 2019 he was found guilty of match fixing by a Swedish court, and said he would appeal. Both Defence and Prosecution said they would appeal the sentence. In June 2020, Etuhu was handed a five-year ban from football in Sweden.

== Career statistics ==
=== Club ===
As of 17 May 2016

Appearances and goals by club, season and competition
Season	Club	League			National cup		League Cup		Play-offs		Europe		Total	
Season	Club	Division	Apps	Goals	Apps	Goals	Apps	Goals	Apps	Goals	Apps	Goals	Apps	Goals
Manchester City	2001–02	Division One	12	0	—		1	0	—		—		13	0
Preston North End	2001–02	Division One	16	3	0	0	—		—		—		16	3
Preston North End	2002–03	Division One	39	6	1	0	4	0	—		—		44	6
Preston North End	2003–04	Division One	31	4	2	1	1	0	—		—		34	4
Preston North End	2004–05	Championship	35	3	1	0	3	0	3	0	—		42	3
Preston North End	2005–06	Championship	13	2	—		0	0	—		—		13	2
Preston North End	Total		134	18	4	1	8	0	3	0	—		149	19
Norwich City (loan)	2005–06	Championship	8	0	—		—		—		—		8	0
Norwich City	2005–06	Championship	11	0	1	0	—		—		—		12	0
Norwich City	2006–07	Championship	43	6	4	0	3	1	—		—		50	7
Norwich City	Total		54	6	5	0	3	1	—		—		62	7
Sunderland	2007–08	Premier League	20	1	0	0	1	0	—		—		21	1
Fulham	2008–09	Premier League	21	1	4	0	0	0	—		—		25	1
Fulham	2009–10	Premier League	20	0	3	0	0	0	—		14	2	37	2
Fulham	2010–11	Premier League	28	2	1	1	2	0	—		—		31	3
Fulham	2011–12	Premier League	22	0	0	0	0	0	—		11	0	33	0
Fulham	Total		91	3	8	1	2	0	—		25	2	126	6
Blackburn Rovers	2012–13	Championship	20	1	0	0	1	0	—		—		21	1
Blackburn Rovers	2013–14	Championship	3	0	0	0	0	0	—		—		3	0
Blackburn Rovers	Total		23	1	0	0	1	0	—		—		24	1
AIK	2015	Allsvenskan	21	2	3	0	—		—		6	0	30	2
AIK	2016	Allsvenskan	2	0	0	0	—		—		0	0	2	0
AIK	Total		23	2	3	0	—		—		6	0	32	2
Career total			330	30	20	2	16	1	3	0	31	2	402	35

2011–12 appearances includes match in Uefa Cup, away to Dnipro on 25 August 2011, which is currently not included on Soccerbase website. 2015 appearances includes three matches in 2014–15 Svenska Cupen, also not included on Soccerbase.

== Honours ==
Manchester City

- Football League First Division: 2001–02

Fulham

- UEFA Europa League runner-up: 2009–10

Nigeria

- Africa Cup of Nations third place: 2010
