= 2000–01 Stockport County F.C. season =

Stockport County
2000–01 season
- Chairman: Brendan Elwood
- Manager: Andy Kilner
- Stadium: Edgeley Park
- First Division: 19th
- FA Cup: Fifth round
- League Cup: First round
- Top goalscorer: Aaron Wilbraham (12)
- Average home league attendance: 7,031
Home colours

During the 2000–01 English football season, Stockport County F.C. competed in the Football League First Division.

== Season summary ==
Stockport started the 2000–01 season poorly and were sitting 23rd in the table with just two wins at the middle of November. However, a run from mid-March resulted in Stockport winning five of their remaining nine league games to again narrowly avoid relegation, finishing 19th overall.

== Final league table ==
Pos	Team	Pld	W	D	L	GF	GA	GD	Pts
17	Sheffield Wednesday	46	15	8	23	52	71	−19	53
18	Grimsby Town	46	14	10	22	43	62	−19	52
19	Stockport County	46	11	18	17	58	65	−7	51
20	Portsmouth	46	10	19	17	47	59	−12	49
21	Crystal Palace	46	12	13	21	57	70	−13	49

Rules for classification: 1) Points; 2) Goal difference; 3) Goals scored

== Results ==
Stockport County's score comes first

=== Legend ===
Win	Draw	Loss

=== Football League First Division ===
Date	Opponent	Venue	Result	Attendance	Scorers
12 August 2000	Gillingham	A	3–1	9,429	Thomas-Moore (2), Maxwell
19 August 2000	Wolverhampton Wanderers	H	1–1	7,758	Thomas-Moore
26 August 2000	Fulham	A	1–4	11,009	Cooper
28 August 2000	Huddersfield Town	H	0–0	6,137	
1 September 2000	Tranmere Rovers	A	1–2	7,229	Thomas-Moore
9 September 2000	West Bromwich Albion	H	0–0	6,632	
12 September 2000	Norwich City	H	1–3	5,703	Smith
16 September 2000	Preston North End	A	1–1	12,735	Thomas-Moore
23 September 2000	Watford	H	2–3	6,933	Wilbraham, Thomas-Moore
30 September 2000	Wimbledon	A	0–2	6,087	
8 October 2000	Portsmouth	H	1–1	6,212	Cooper
14 October 2000	Burnley	A	1–2	16,107	Tod
17 October 2000	Birmingham City	A	0–4	15,579	
21 October 2000	Bolton Wanderers	H	4–3	8,266	Tod, Wiss, Thomas-Moore, Wilbraham
24 October 2000	Sheffield United	A	0–1	17,010	
28 October 2000	Nottingham Forest	H	1–2	6,021	Edwards (own goal)
4 November 2000	Blackburn Rovers	A	1–2	17,404	Wilbraham
11 November 2000	Queens Park Rangers	H	2–2	6,356	Bergersen, Wilbraham
18 November 2000	Crewe Alexandra	A	2–1	6,099	Tod, Clark
25 November 2000	Crystal Palace	A	2–2	18,819	Wilbraham, Fradin
2 December 2000	Sheffield United	H	0–2	6,460	
9 December 2000	Sheffield Wednesday	A	4–2	16,337	Fradin (2), Cooper (2)
16 December 2000	Barnsley	H	2–0	5,383	Wiss, Woodthorpe
22 December 2000	Gillingham	H	2–2	6,095	Wiss, Maxwell
26 December 2000	Grimsby Town	A	1–1	6,654	Matthews
30 December 2000	Wolverhampton Wanderers	A	2–3	16,667	Nicholson (pen), Wiss
1 January 2001	Fulham	H	2–0	6,100	Wiss, Clark
13 January 2001	Huddersfield Town	A	0–0	10,988	
20 January 2001	Grimsby Town	H	1–1	6,165	Wiss
3 February 2001	Tranmere Rovers	H	1–1	7,804	Wilbraham
10 February 2001	West Bromwich Albion	A	1–1	16,385	Cooper
13 February 2001	Preston North End	H	0–1	7,590	
20 February 2001	Norwich City	A	0–4	19,768	
24 February 2001	Watford	A	2–2	13,647	Wilbraham (2)
3 March 2001	Wimbledon	H	2–2	5,519	Wilbraham, Fradin
6 March 2001	Burnley	H	0–0	7,087	
10 March 2001	Portsmouth	A	1–2	12,202	Kuqi
17 March 2001	Birmingham City	H	2–0	7,176	Kuqi (2)
31 March 2001	Barnsley	A	2–0	13,203	Kuqi, Wilbraham
3 April 2001	Bolton Wanderers	A	1–1	12,492	Kuqi
7 April 2001	Sheffield Wednesday	H	2–1	9,666	Harkness (own goal), Carrigan
14 April 2001	Blackburn Rovers	H	0–0	9,705	
16 April 2001	Nottingham Forest	A	0–1	23,500	
21 April 2001	Crewe Alexandra	H	3–0	7,163	Fradin, Nicholson (pen), Wilbraham
28 April 2001	Queens Park Rangers	A	3–0	10,608	Wilbraham, Fradin, Kuqi (pen)
6 May 2001	Crystal Palace	H	0–1	9,782	

=== FA Cup ===
Round	Date	Opponent	Venue	Result	Attendance	Goalscorers
R3	6 January 2001	Preston North End	A	1–0	9,975	Fradin
R4	27 January 2001	Crewe Alexandra	A	1–0	7,318	Wiss
R5	17 February 2001	Tottenham Hotspur	A	0–4	36,040	

=== League Cup ===
Round	Date	Opponent	Venue	Result	Attendance	Goalscorers
R1 1st Leg	22 August 2000	Blackpool	H	0–1	3,014	
R1 2nd Leg	5 September 2000	Blackpool	A	2–3 (lost 2–4 on agg)	3,133	Dinning, Thomas-Moore

== First-team squad ==
Squad at end of season

Note: Flags indicate national team as defined under FIFA eligibility rules; some limited exceptions apply. Players may hold more than one non-FIFA nationality.

No.	Pos.	Nation	Player
1	GK	IRL	Alan Kelly
2	DF	ENG	Sean Connelly
3	DF	ENG	Shane Nicholson
4	DF	SWE	Fredrik Bryngelsson
5	DF	ENG	Mike Flynn
6	DF	ENG	Peter Clark
8	FW	FIN	Shefki Kuqi
9	FW	SCO	Brian Carrigan
10	MF	WAL	Leyton Maxwell (on loan from Liverpool)
11	MF	ENG	Colin Woodthorpe
12	MF	ENG	Ali Gibb
13	GK	WAL	Lee Jones
14	MF	FIN	Jarkko Wiss
15	MF	FRA	Karim Fradin
16	DF	ENG	Leo Roget (on loan from Southend United)
17	DF	ENG	Simon Grayson (on loan from Blackburn Rovers)
18	FW	ENG	Ian Lawson
19	FW	ENG	Aaron Wilbraham

No.	Pos.	Nation	Player
20	MF	ENG	David Smith
21	MF	SWE	Jonas Larsson
23	FW	ENG	Alan Bailey
24	DF	ENG	Keith Briggs
25	MF	ENG	Chris Byrne
26	DF	ENG	Glynn Hancock
27	FW	ENG	Neil Ross
28	GK	WAL	Andy Dibble
29	DF	ENG	Ben Johnson
30	FW	IRL	Jon Daly
31	GK	ENG	Sam Turner
32	DF	ENG	Robert Clare
33	MF	NOR	Kent Bergersen
34	FW	IRL	Michael Hennessy
35	MF	WAL	Lee Evans
36	FW	ENG	Phil Carratt
37	FW	ENG	Glynn Hurst

=== Left club during season ===
Note: Flags indicate national team as defined under FIFA eligibility rules; some limited exceptions apply. Players may hold more than one non-FIFA nationality.

No.	Pos.	Nation	Player
1	GK	ENG	Carlo Nash (to Manchester City)
7	MF	ENG	Kevin Cooper (to Wimbledon)
8	FW	ENG	Ian Thomas-Moore (to Burnley)
16	DF	IRL	Jim Gannon (to Crewe Alexandra)
17	MF	ENG	Tony Dinning (to Wolverhampton Wanderers)

No.	Pos.	Nation	Player
17	DF	SCO	Andy Tod (on loan from Dunfermline Athletic)
22	MF	ENG	Rob Matthews (to Hull City)
36	DF	ENG	Kevin Gray (on loan from Huddersfield Town)
37	MF	SCO	Grant Brebner (on loan from Hibernian)

=== Reserve squad ===
Note: Flags indicate national team as defined under FIFA eligibility rules; some limited exceptions apply. Players may hold more than one non-FIFA nationality.

No.	Pos.	Nation	Player
—	MF	ENG	Fraser McLachlan
