= 1999–2000 Stockport County F.C. season =

Stockport County
1999–2000 season
- Chairman: Brendan Elwood
- Manager: Andy Kilner
- Stadium: Edgeley Park
- First Division: 17th
- FA Cup: Third round
- League Cup: Second round
- Top goalscorer: League: Dinning (12); All: Dinning (13)
- Average home league attendance: 7,411
Home colours	Away colours

During the 1999–2000 English football season, Stockport County F.C. competed in the Football League First Division.

== Season summary ==
In the 1999–2000 season, Andy Kilner replaced Gary Megson as Stockport's manager in the summer. Stockport had a brilliant first half of the campaign and on Boxing Day, they sat in the play-off places but afterwards came a dramatic slide in form with just 2 wins from the next 22 league games and Stockport finished the season in a disappointing 17th place.

== Final league table ==
Pos	Team	Pld	W	D	L	GF	GA	GD	Pts
15	Crystal Palace	46	13	15	18	57	67	−10	54
16	Sheffield United	46	13	15	18	59	71	−12	54
17	Stockport County	46	13	15	18	55	67	−12	54
18	Portsmouth	46	13	12	21	55	66	−11	51
19	Crewe Alexandra	46	14	9	23	46	67	−21	51

Rules for classification: 1) Points; 2) Goal difference; 3) Goals scored

== Results ==
Stockport County's score comes first

=== Legend ===
Win	Draw	Loss

=== Football League First Division ===
Date	Opponent	Venue	Result	Attendance	Scorers
7 August 1999	Grimsby Town	A	1–0	5,528	Smith
14 August 1999	Tranmere Rovers	H	2–1	6,555	Connelly, Dinning (pen)
21 August 1999	Portsmouth	A	0–2	15,002	
27 August 1999	Birmingham City	H	2–0	6,115	Wilbraham, D'Jaffo
10 September 1999	Barnsley	A	1–2	13,173	D'Jaffo
18 September 1999	Port Vale	H	1–0	7,632	Nicholson
25 September 1999	Norwich City	H	2–2	7,603	D'Jaffo, Dinning
28 September 1999	Charlton Athletic	A	0–4	19,842	
2 October 1999	Walsall	A	2–1	5,492	Dinning (2, 1 pen)
9 October 1999	Swindon Town	A	1–1	5,318	Dinning
16 October 1999	Crewe Alexandra	H	2–1	7,571	Connelly, D'Jaffo
19 October 1999	Huddersfield Town	H	1–1	7,305	Byrne
23 October 1999	Nottingham Forest	A	1–1	15,770	D'Jaffo
26 October 1999	Norwich City	A	0–2	16,880	
30 October 1999	Walsall	H	1–1	6,592	Byrne
2 November 1999	Queens Park Rangers	H	3–3	4,868	D'Jaffo, Thomas-Moore, Briggs
6 November 1999	Fulham	H	2–1	7,200	Thomas-Moore, Cooper
20 November 1999	Sheffield United	H	1–1	6,614	D'Jaffo
23 November 1999	West Bromwich Albion	A	0–2	9,201	
27 November 1999	Blackburn Rovers	A	0–2	17,592	
4 December 1999	Grimsby Town	H	2–1	5,581	Dinning (pen), Cooper
7 December 1999	Manchester City	A	2–1	32,686	Bailey, Dinning (pen)
18 December 1999	Bolton Wanderers	A	1–0	13,285	Dinning
26 December 1999	Wolverhampton Wanderers	H	3–2	10,278	Dinning, Thomas-Moore (2)
28 December 1999	Ipswich Town	A	0–1	20,671	
3 January 2000	Crystal Palace	H	1–2	8,570	Thomas-Moore
15 January 2000	Tranmere Rovers	A	0–0	7,565	
22 January 2000	Portsmouth	H	1–1	8,008	Dinning (pen)
29 January 2000	Birmingham City	A	1–2	17,150	Johnson (own goal)
5 February 2000	Charlton Athletic	H	1–3	8,185	Fradin
12 February 2000	Queens Park Rangers	A	1–1	10,531	Matthews
19 February 2000	Blackburn Rovers	H	0–1	7,902	
26 February 2000	Port Vale	A	1–1	5,663	Wilbraham
3 March 2000	Barnsley	H	1–3	6,386	Lawson
7 March 2000	Fulham	A	1–4	8,688	Dinning (pen)
11 March 2000	West Bromwich Albion	H	0–1	8,238	
14 March 2000	Bolton Wanderers	H	0–0	6,412	
18 March 2000	Sheffield United	A	0–1	14,907	
21 March 2000	Manchester City	H	2–2	11,212	Thomas-Moore, Flynn
25 March 2000	Wolverhampton Wanderers	A	2–2	25,065	Lawson, Dinning
8 April 2000	Crystal Palace	A	3–3	16,646	Thomas-Moore (2), Cooper
15 April 2000	Ipswich Town	H	0–1	8,501	
22 April 2000	Crewe Alexandra	A	2–3	5,813	Lawson, Thomas-Moore
24 April 2000	Swindon Town	H	3–0	5,362	Thomas-Moore, Lawson, Connelly
29 April 2000	Huddersfield Town	A	2–0	14,046	Cooper, Armstrong (own goal)
7 May 2000	Nottingham Forest	H	2–3	7,756	Wilbraham (2)

=== FA Cup ===
Round	Date	Opponent	Venue	Result	Attendance	Goalscorers
R3	11 December 1999	Grimsby Town	A	2–3	3,400	Bailey, Thomas-Moore

=== League Cup ===
Round	Date	Opponent	Venue	Result	Attendance	Goalscorers
R1 1st Leg	10 August 1999	Oldham Athletic	H	2–0	3,017	Cooper, Angell
R1 2nd Leg	24 August 1999	Oldham Athletic	A	1–1 (won 3-1 on agg)	2,750	Woodthorpe
R2 1st Leg	14 September 1999	Barnsley	A	1–1	6,966	Briggs
R2 2nd Leg	21 September 1999	Barnsley	H	3–3 (lost on away goals)	3,332	Wilbraham, D'Jaffo, Dinning (pen)

== Squad ==
Note: Flags indicate national team as defined under FIFA eligibility rules; some limited exceptions apply. Players may hold more than one non-FIFA nationality.

No.	Pos.	Nation	Player
1	GK	(England) ENG	Carlo Nash
2	DF	(England) ENG	Sean Connelly
3	DF	(England) ENG	Shane Nicholson
4	MF	(Scotland) SCO	Tom Bennett
5	DF	(England) ENG	Mike Flynn
6	DF	(England) ENG	Martin Taylor (on loan from Blackburn Rovers)
7	MF	(England) ENG	Kevin Cooper
8	FW	(England) ENG	Ian Thomas-Moore
9	FW	(Saint Kitts and Nevis) SKN	Kevin Francis
10	MF	(England) ENG	Chris Byrne
11	MF	(England) ENG	Colin Woodthorpe
12	MF	(England) ENG	Ali Gibb
13	GK	(England) ENG	Ian Gray
14	MF	(England) ENG	David Smith
15	MF	(England) ENG	Rob Matthews
16	MF	(England) ENG	Jim Gannon

No.	Pos.	Nation	Player
17	MF	(England) ENG	Tony Dinning
18	FW	(England) ENG	Ian Lawson
19	FW	(England) ENG	Aaron Wilbraham
20	MF	(Republic of Ireland) IRL	Sean Mannion
21	FW	(England) ENG	Adam Lillis
22	DF	(England) ENG	Ben Johnson
23	FW	(England) ENG	Alan Bailey
24	DF	(England) ENG	Keith Briggs
25	FW	(France) FRA	Karim Fradin
26	DF	(England) ENG	Glynn Hancock
27	FW	(England) ENG	Neil Ross
28	MF	(England) ENG	Chris Allen
30	FW	(Republic of Ireland) IRL	Jon Daly
31	MF	(England) ENG	Stuart Elliott (on loan from Newcastle United)
32	DF	(England) ENG	Robert Clare
33	MF	(Norway) NOR	Kent Bergersen

=== Left club during season ===
Note: Flags indicate national team as defined under FIFA eligibility rules; some limited exceptions apply. Players may hold more than one non-FIFA nationality.

No.	Pos.	Nation	Player
27	MF	(England) ENG	Kevin Gibbens (on loan from Southampton)
28	DF	(England) ENG	Garry Monk (on loan from Southampton)
12	FW	(England) ENG	Tony Ellis (to Rochdale)

No.	Pos.	Nation	Player
18	FW	(Benin) BEN	Laurent D'Jaffo (to Sheffield United)
9	FW	(England) ENG	Brett Angell (on loan to Preston North End)
32	GK	(England) ENG	Matt Glennon (on loan from Bolton Wanderers)
