= 2001–02 Stockport County F.C. season =

Stockport County
2001–02 season
- Chairman: Brendan Elwood
- Manager: Andy Kilner (until 29 October); Craig Madden (caretaker until 6 November); Carlton Palmer (player-manager from 6 November)
- Stadium: Edgeley Park
- First Division: 24th (relegated)
- FA Cup: Third round
- League Cup: Second round
- Top goalscorer: League: Beckett (7); All: Beckett/Taylor (7)
- Average home league attendance: 6,245

During the 2001–02 English football season, Stockport County competed in the Football League First Division.

== Season summary ==
The 2001–02 season turned out to be the Stockport's worst ever season at the time. With Stockport already bottom of the league, a 4–0 home defeat to Millwall saw manager Kilner sacked. Shortly after he was replaced with former England international Carlton Palmer. A 2–1 win over Norwich gave them some hope, but Stockport then went on to lose 11 matches in a row, another unwanted club record. The Hatters picked up just 3 more wins during the rest of the season (one of these being another unforgettable 2–1 victory over Manchester City, having been 1–0 down with just 5 minutes left) finishing the season with just 26 points, going down on 16 March, the quickest post-war relegation until that point, later surpassed by Sheffield Wednesday in the 2025–26 season (though partly because of an 18-point deduction).

== Final league table ==
Pos	Team	Pld	W	D	L	GF	GA	GD	Pts	Qualification or relegation
20	Sheffield Wednesday	46	12	14	20	49	71	−22	50	
21	Rotherham United	46	10	19	17	52	66	−14	49	
22	Crewe Alexandra (R)	46	12	13	21	47	76	−29	49	Relegation to the Second Division
23	Barnsley (R)	46	11	15	20	59	86	−27	48	Relegation to the Second Division
24	Stockport County (R)	46	6	8	32	42	102	−60	26	Relegation to the Second Division

Rules for classification: 1) Points; 2) Goal difference; 3) Goals scored
(R) Relegated

== Results ==
Stockport County's score comes first

=== Legend ===
Win	Draw	Loss

=== Football League First Division ===
Date	Opponent	Venue	Result	Attendance	Scorers
11 August 2001	Coventry City	H	0–2	9,329	
18 August 2001	Crystal Palace	A	1–4	15,760	Fradin
25 August 2001	Portsmouth	H	0–1	5,090	
27 August 2001	Birmingham City	A	1–2	18,478	Kuqi (pen)
8 September 2001	Barnsley	A	2–2	11,192	Flynn, Taylor
15 September 2001	Wolverhampton Wanderers	A	2–2	20,742	Kuqi, Taylor
18 September 2001	Sheffield United	H	1–2	5,137	Roget (pen)
22 September 2001	Grimsby Town	H	3–3	7,834	Hardy (2), Wilbraham
25 September 2001	Bradford City	A	4–2	12,940	Hurst (2), Taylor (2)
29 September 2001	Nottingham Forest	A	1–2	17,584	Flynn
13 October 2001	Manchester City	A	2–2	34,214	Hurst, Kuqi (pen)
16 October 2001	West Bromwich Albion	H	1–2	6,052	Fradin
20 October 2001	Rotherham United	H	0–1	6,616	
24 October 2001	Crewe Alexandra	A	0–0	6,679	
27 October 2001	Millwall	H	0–4	5,371	
30 October 2001	Walsall	H	0–2	4,553	
3 November 2001	Preston North End	A	0–6	13,776	
10 November 2001	Watford	A	1–1	12,576	Robinson (own goal)
15 November 2001	Norwich City	H	2–1	6,551	Hurst, Palmer
24 November 2001	Sheffield Wednesday	A	0–5	17,365	
27 November 2001	Gillingham	H	0–2	4,854	
1 December 2001	Crewe Alexandra	H	0–1	5,308	
8 December 2001	Wimbledon	H	1–2	4,673	Wilbraham
15 December 2001	Burnley	A	2–3	15,526	McSheffrey, Kuqi (pen)
22 December 2001	Portsmouth	A	0–2	13,887	
26 December 2001	Barnsley	H	1–3	6,885	Kuqi
29 December 2001	Birmingham City	H	0–3	5,827	
1 January 2002	West Bromwich Albion	A	0–4	20,541	
13 January 2002	Crystal Palace	H	0–1	5,541	
19 January 2002	Coventry City	A	0–0	12,448	
29 January 2002	Gillingham	A	3–3	7,217	Beckett (2), Ross
2 February 2002	Nottingham Forest	H	1–3	6,513	Palmer
9 February 2002	Rotherham United	A	2–3	6,413	Hardiker, Delaney
23 February 2002	Wolverhampton Wanderers	H	1–4	8,481	Beckett
26 February 2002	Grimsby Town	A	1–3	6,836	Palmer
2 March 2002	Sheffield United	A	0–3	15,642	
5 March 2002	Bradford City	H	1–0	4,148	Beckett
9 March 2002	Burnley	H	0–2	6,410	
16 March 2002	Wimbledon	A	1–3	5,224	Daly
19 March 2002	Manchester City	H	2–1	9,537	Hardiker (2)
23 March 2002	Preston North End	H	0–2	6,139	
30 March 2002	Millwall	A	0–3	13,570	
1 April 2002	Watford	H	2–1	4,086	McLachlan, Beckett
6 April 2002	Walsall	A	0–1	6,322	
13 April 2002	Sheffield Wednesday	H	3–1	8,706	Wilbraham, Beckett (2)
21 April 2002	Norwich City	A	0–2	20,897	

=== FA Cup ===
Round	Date	Opponent	Venue	Result	Attendance	Goalscorers
R3	16 January 2002	Bolton Wanderers	H	1–4	5,821	Daly (pen)

=== League Cup ===
Round	Date	Opponent	Venue	Result	Attendance	Goalscorers
R1	21 August 2001	Carlisle United	H	3–0	2,075	Kuqi, Taylor (2)
R2	12 September 2001	Nottingham Forest	A	1–1 (lost 7–8 on pens)	5,432	Taylor

== Squad ==
Note: Flags indicate national team as defined under FIFA eligibility rules; some limited exceptions apply. Players may hold more than one non-FIFA nationality.

No.	Pos.	Nation	Player
1	GK	WAL	Lee Jones
2	DF	FIN	Petri Helin
3	DF	ENG	Peter Clark
4	DF	ENG	Dave Challinor
6	FW	ENG	Kevin Ellison
7	MF	ENG	Carlton Palmer
10	DF	ENG	John Hardiker
11	MF	ENG	Colin Woodthorpe
12	MF	ENG	Ali Gibb
13	GK	WAL	Andy Dibble
15	MF	FRA	Karim Fradin
16	DF	ENG	Leo Roget
17	FW	ENG	Neil Hardy
18	DF	ENG	Aaron Lescott
19	FW	ENG	Aaron Wilbraham
20	MF	ENG	David Smith
21	MF	SWE	Jonas Larsson

No.	Pos.	Nation	Player
24	MF	ENG	Keith Briggs
25	FW	ENG	Luke Beckett
26	DF	ENG	Glyn Hancock
27	FW	ENG	Neil Ross
28	FW	ENG	Peter Wild
29	MF	ENG	Andy Welsh
30	FW	IRL	Jon Daly
31	GK	WAL	Sam Turner
32	DF	ENG	Robert Clare
33	DF	ENG	Andy Thomas
34	MF	ENG	Fraser McLachlan
35	DF	ENG	Anthony Kielthy
36	FW	ENG	Phil Carratt
37	FW	ENG	Mark Byrne
38	FW	ENG	Chris Williams
41	GK	ENG	James Spencer
42	FW	ENG	David Holt

=== Left club during season ===
Note: Flags indicate national team as defined under FIFA eligibility rules; some limited exceptions apply. Players may hold more than one non-FIFA nationality.

No.	Pos.	Nation	Player
18	FW	ENG	Ian Lawson (to Bury)
23	DF	ENG	Lee Sandford (on loan from Sheffield United)
22	GK	ENG	Tim Flowers (on loan from Leicester City)
8	MF	NED	Richard Sneekes (to Hull City)
6	DF	AUS	Jason van Blerk (to Wrexham)
25	GK	FRA	Pegguy Arphexad (on loan from Liverpool)
37	FW	ENG	Glynn Hurst (to Chesterfield)
9	FW	FIN	Shefki Kuqi (to Sheffield Wednesday)

No.	Pos.	Nation	Player
4	DF	SWE	Fredrik Bryngelsson (Released)
14	MF	FIN	Jarkko Wiss (to Hibernian)
10	FW	ENG	Scott Taylor (to Blackpool)
22	MF	ENG	Gary McSheffrey (on loan from Coventry City)
5	DF	WAL	Mike Flynn (to Barnsley)
23	MF	IRL	Damien Delaney (on loan from Leicester City)
40	GK	ENG	Gary Maguire (Released)
