= 2002–03 Stockport County F.C. season =

Stockport County
2002–03 season
- Manager: Carlton Palmer (player-manager)
- Stadium: Edgeley Park
- Second Division: 14th
- FA Cup: Second round
- League Cup: Second round
- FL Trophy: Second round

During the 2002–03 season, Stockport County competed in the Football League Second Division, in which they finished 14th. They also competed in the FA Cup, Football League Cup and Football League Trophy, and were eliminated in the second round of all three competitions.

== Second Division ==
=== League table ===
Pos	Team	Pld	W	D	L	GF	GA	GD	Pts
12	Colchester United	46	14	16	16	52	56	−4	58
13	Blackpool	46	15	13	18	56	64	−8	58
14	Stockport County	46	15	10	21	65	70	−5	55
15	Notts County	46	13	16	17	62	70	−8	55
16	Brentford	46	14	12	20	47	56	−9	54

Rules for classification: In the Football League goals scored (GF) takes precedence over goal difference (GD).

=== Matches ===
Second Division match details
Date	Opponents	Venue	Result	Score F–A	Scorers	Attendance
10 August 2002	Colchester United	A	L	0–1		3,300
13 August 2002	Queens Park Rangers	H	D	1–1	Beckett 62'	5,811
17 August 2002	Notts County	H	D	0–0		5,047
24 August 2002	Port Vale	A	W	1–0	Beckett 17'	4,070
26 August 2002	Mansfield Town	H	W	2–0	Reddington 39' o.g.	5,190
31 August 2002	Swindon Town	A	W	1–0	Beckett 56'	5,456
14 September 2002	Cardiff City	A	L	1–2	Beckett 16'	11,546
17 September 2002	Chesterfield	A	L	0–1		4,088
21 September 2002	Barnsley	H	W	4–1	Goodwin 63', 72', Beckett 66', 75'	5,690
28 September 2002	Tranmere Rovers	A	L	0–1		7,513
5 October 2002	Luton Town	H	L	2–3	Beckett 19', Daly 45'	5,932
8 October 2002	Peterborough United	H	W	2–1	Beckett 14', 60'	4,726
12 October 2002	Crewe Alexandra	H	L	1–4	Daly 65'	6,468
19 October 2002	Wigan Athletic	A	L	1–2	Beckett 4'	7,276
26 October 2002	Brentford	H	L	2–3	Beckett 45', Palmer 90'	4,601
29 October 2002	Blackpool	A	W	3–1	Ellison 46', Gibb 74', Beckett 89'	7,047
2 November 2002	Oldham Athletic	A	L	0–2		8,251
9 November 2002	Cheltenham Town	H	D	1–1	Burgess 40'	4,531
23 November 2002	Plymouth Argyle	A	L	1–4	Wootton 11' o.g.	7,746
30 November 2002	Wycombe Wanderers	H	W	2–1	Beckett 10', Ross 39'	4,731
14 December 2002	Huddersfield Town	A	L	1–2	Briggs 74'	7,978
20 December 2002	Northampton Town	H	W	4–0	Beckett 23', 46', 60', Burgess 77'	4,516
26 December 2002	Mansfield Town	A	L	2–4	Day 3' o.g., Burgess 17' pen.	6,434
28 December 2002	Bristol City	H	L	1–4	Beckett 57'	5,100
1 January 2003	Port Vale	H	D	1–1	Burgess 31' pen.	4,390
4 January 2003	Queens Park Rangers	A	L	0–1		10,387
18 January 2003	Swindon Town	H	L	2–5	Lescott 83', Lambert 89'	4,318
21 January 2003	Notts County	A	L	2–3	Beckett 15', 30'	4,392
25 January 2003	Bristol City	A	D	1–1	Beckett 22'	10,831
1 February 2003	Colchester United	H	D	1–1	Beckett 36'	4,011
8 February 2003	Cheltenham Town	A	W	2–0	Daly 76', Wild 90'	4,692
15 February 2003	Oldham Athletic	H	L	1–2	Daly 46'	8,168
22 February 2003	Peterborough United	A	L	0–2		4,386
1 March 2003	Cardiff City	H	D	1–1	Clark 26'	5,385
4 March 2003	Chesterfield	H	W	2–1	Beckett 40', Daly 84'	4,428
8 March 2003	Barnsley	A	L	0–1		9,177
15 March 2003	Brentford	A	W	2–1	Beckett 51', 54'	4,790
18 March 2003	Wigan Athletic	H	D	1–1	Welsh 70'	6,719
22 March 2003	Blackpool	H	D	2–2	Lambert 45', Beckett 77'	6,599
29 March 2003	Crewe Alexandra	A	L	0–1		7,336
5 April 2003	Wycombe Wanderers	A	W	4–1	Beckett 78', Greer 85', Wilbraham 88', 90'	5,632
12 April 2003	Plymouth Argyle	H	W	2–1	Wilbraham 40', Daly 86' pen.	5,484
18 April 2003	Northampton Town	A	W	3–0	Wilbraham 7', 24', Goodwin 14'	5,873
21 April 2003	Huddersfield Town	H	W	2–1	Daly 79', Wilbraham 81'	7,159
26 April 2003	Luton Town	A	D	1–1	Challinor 83'	6,010
3 May 2003	Tranmere Rovers	H	L	2–3	Wilbraham 7', Welsh 21'	7,236

== FA Cup ==
FA Cup match details
Round	Date	Opponents	Venue	Result	Score F–A	Scorers	Attendance
First round	16 November 2002	St Albans City	H	W	4–1	Beckett 24', Fradin 42', Burgess 57' pen., 80'	3,303
Second round	7 December 2002	Plymouth Argyle	H	L	0–3		3,571

== League Cup ==
League Cup match details
Round	Date	Opponents	Venue	Result	Score F–A	Scorers	Attendance
First round	10 September 2002	Lincoln City	A	W	3–1	Palmer 21', Beckett 54', Clare 83'	2,084
Second round	1 October 2002	Gillingham	H	L	1–2 (a.e.t.)	Daly 8'	2,396

== Football League Trophy ==
Football League Trophy match details
Round	Date	Opponents	Venue	Result	Score F–A	Scorers	Attendance
First round	22 October 2002	Darlington	H	W	1–0	Briggs 39'	1,190
Second round	12 November 2002	Carlisle United	A	L	0–1 (a.e.t.)		1,918
