= 1998–99 Stockport County F.C. season =

Stockport County
1998–99 season
- Chairman: Brendan Elwood
- Manager: Gary Megson
- Stadium: Edgeley Park
- First Division: 16th
- FA Cup: Fourth round
- League Cup: First round
- Top goalscorer: League: Angell (17); All: Angell (18)
- Average home league attendance: 7,900

During the 1998–99 English football season, Stockport County F.C. competed in the Football League First Division.

== Season summary ==
In the 1998–99 season, Stockport finished in 16th place, winning just 3 of their final 14 matches. A 5–0 defeat at relegated Oxford United on the final day signalled the end of Megson's time at Edgeley Park.

== Final league table ==
Pos	Team	Pld	W	D	L	GF	GA	GD	Pts
14	Crystal Palace	46	14	16	16	58	71	−13	58
15	Tranmere Rovers	46	12	20	14	63	61	+2	56
16	Stockport County	46	12	17	17	49	60	−11	53
17	Swindon Town	46	13	11	22	59	81	−22	50
18	Crewe Alexandra	46	12	12	22	54	78	−24	48

Rules for classification: 1) Points; 2) Goals scored; 3) Goal difference

== Results ==
Stockport County's score comes first

=== Legend ===
Win	Draw	Loss

=== Football League First Division ===
Date	Opponent	Venue	Result	Attendance	Scorers
8 August 1998	Bradford City	A	2–1	14,360	Dinning (2 pens)
15 August 1998	Norwich City	H	0–2	6,538	
21 August 1998	Barnsley	A	1–1	16,377	Branch
29 August 1998	Crystal Palace	H	1–1	7,739	C Byrne
31 August 1998	Wolverhampton Wanderers	A	2–2	22,217	Angell (2)
5 September 1998	Grimsby Town	H	2–0	6,199	Angell (2)
8 September 1998	Birmingham City	A	0–2	16,429	
12 September 1998	Crewe Alexandra	H	1–1	7,302	Flynn
19 September 1998	Queens Park Rangers	A	0–2	8,205	
26 September 1998	West Bromwich Albion	H	2–2	8,804	McIntosh, C Byrne
29 September 1998	Huddersfield Town	H	1–1	8,023	Thomas-Moore
3 October 1998	Swindon Town	A	3–2	7,691	McIntosh, Branch, Thomas-Moore
17 October 1998	Bury	A	1–1	5,732	Branch
20 October 1998	Sheffield United	A	1–1	12,657	Thomas-Moore
24 October 1998	Ipswich Town	H	0–1	7,432	
31 October 1998	Tranmere Rovers	A	1–1	6,597	Angell
8 November 1998	Port Vale	H	4–2	7,612	Angell (3), Grant
14 November 1998	Watford	H	1–1	8,019	Dinning (pen)
21 November 1998	Bristol City	A	1–1	11,032	Angell
24 November 1998	Bolton Wanderers	H	0–1	8,520	
28 November 1998	Portsmouth	H	2–0	7,504	Cooper, Dinning (pen)
5 December 1998	Sunderland	A	0–1	36,040	
12 December 1998	Watford	A	2–4	9,250	Angell, Connelly
19 December 1998	Oxford United	H	2–0	6,500	Matthews, Dinning (pen)
26 December 1998	Barnsley	H	0–1	10,263	
28 December 1998	Grimsby Town	A	0–1	8,058	
9 January 1999	Bradford City	H	1–2	8,975	Angell
16 January 1999	Crystal Palace	A	2–2	15,517	Angell (2)
30 January 1999	Wolverhampton Wanderers	H	1–2	8,654	Angell
6 February 1999	Norwich City	A	2–0	14,675	Angell, Wilson (own goal)
13 February 1999	Birmingham City	H	1–0	9,056	Angell
20 February 1999	Crewe Alexandra	A	2–0	5,473	Woodthorpe, Ellis
27 February 1999	Queens Park Rangers	H	0–0	7,694	
2 March 1999	West Bromwich Albion	A	1–3	11,801	McIntosh
6 March 1999	Huddersfield Town	A	0–3	11,914	
9 March 1999	Swindon Town	H	2–1	6,048	Angell, Ellis (pen)
13 March 1999	Port Vale	A	1–1	6,456	Smith
20 March 1999	Tranmere Rovers	H	0–0	7,589	
3 April 1999	Bury	H	0–0	7,483	
5 April 1999	Bolton Wanderers	A	2–1	18,587	Ellis, Woodthorpe
10 April 1999	Sheffield United	H	1–0	7,551	Matthews
17 April 1999	Bristol City	H	2–2	7,602	Ellis (2)
20 April 1999	Ipswich Town	A	0–1	17,056	
24 April 1999	Portsmouth	A	1–3	11,212	Ellis
1 May 1999	Sunderland	H	0–1	10,548	
9 May 1999	Oxford United	A	0–5	6,830	

=== FA Cup ===
Round	Date	Opponent	Venue	Result	Attendance	Goalscorers
R3	2 January 1999	Bury	A	3–0	5,325	Angell, Lucketti (own goal), Woodthorpe
R4	23 January 1999	Sheffield Wednesday	A	0–2	20,984	

=== League Cup ===
Round	Date	Opponent	Venue	Result	Attendance	Goalscorers
R1 1st Leg	11 August 1998	Hull City	H	2–2	3,134	Thomas-Moore, C Byrne
R1 2nd Leg	18 August 1998	Hull City	A	0–0 (lost on away goals)	3,480	

== Squad ==
Note: Flags indicate national team as defined under FIFA eligibility rules; some limited exceptions apply. Players may hold more than one non-FIFA nationality.

No.	Pos.	Nation	Player
—	GK	ENG	Ian Gray
—	GK	ENG	Carlo Nash
—	DF	IRL	Des Byrne
—	DF	ENG	Sean Connelly
—	DF	ENG	Mike Flynn
—	DF	ENG	Jim Gannon
—	DF	SCO	Martin McIntosh
—	DF	ENG	Colin Woodthorpe
—	MF	NOR	Paal Christian Alsaker
—	MF	SCO	Tom Bennett
—	MF	ENG	Graham Branch
—	MF	ENG	Chris Byrne
—	MF	ENG	Paul Cook
—	MF	ENG	Kevin Cooper

No.	Pos.	Nation	Player
—	MF	ENG	Tony Dinning
—	MF	ENG	Paul Hughes
—	MF	IRL	Sean Mannion
—	MF	ENG	Rob Matthews
—	MF	SCO	Derek McInnes
—	MF	WAL	Wayne Phillips
—	MF	ENG	David Smith
—	MF	ENG	Simon Travis
—	FW	ENG	Brett Angell
—	FW	IRL	Jon Daly
—	FW	ENG	Tony Ellis
—	FW	ENG	Ian Thomas-Moore
—	FW	ENG	Aaron Wilbraham
—	FW	IRL	Stephen Grant
