= 1997–98 Stockport County F.C. season =

Stockport County
1997–98 season
- Manager: Gary Megson
- Stadium: Edgeley Park
- First Division: 8th
- FA Cup: Fourth round
- League Cup: Second round

During the 1997–98 English football season, Stockport County F.C. competed in the First Division.

== Season summary ==
Stockport's return to the second flight after an absence of 60 years appeared to be in danger of being written off as a failure before a ball had been kicked, as manager Dave Jones, who had led County to promotion and the League Cup semi-final the previous season, left to join Southampton, taking his assistant John Sainty, goalkeeper Paul Jones and defender Lee Todd with him to The Dell. Gary Megson was recruited from Blackpool as his replacement. Three points from the opening seven games left Stockport facing relegation, but four straight wins after that lifted Stockport up to eighth, signalling the end of their relegation fears for the season. These fears were replaced with hopes of finally reaching the top flight, but ultimately County's poor away form saw them finish in eighth, nine points off the play-offs. Of course, this was still as success, for this was Stockport's highest-ever placing in England's footballing ladder while at the same time this season was Manchester City's worst season in their history.

== Final league table ==
Pos	Team	Pld	W	D	L	GF	GA	GD	Pts	Qualification or relegation
6	Sheffield United	46	19	17	10	69	54	+15	74	Qualification for the First Division play-offs
7	Birmingham City	46	19	17	10	60	35	+25	74	
8	Stockport County	46	19	8	19	71	69	+2	65	
9	Wolverhampton Wanderers	46	18	11	17	57	53	+4	65	
10	West Bromwich Albion	46	16	13	17	50	56	−6	61	

Source: Statto.com
Rules for classification: 1) Points; 2) Goals scored; 3) Goal difference

== Results ==
Stockport County's scores comes first

=== Legend ===
Win	Draw	Loss

=== First Division ===
- Stockport County 3–1 Manchester City (Cook, Angell, Armstrong)
- Manchester City 4–1 Stockport County

== Squad ==
Squad at end of season

Note: Flags indicate national team as defined under FIFA eligibility rules; some limited exceptions apply. Players may hold more than one non-FIFA nationality.

No.	Pos.	Nation	Player
—	GK	ENG	Eric Nixon
—	DF	ENG	Sean Connelly
—	DF	ENG	Mike Flynn
—	DF	ENG	Jim Gannon
—	DF	ENG	Simon Travis
—	DF	ENG	Ronnie Wallwork (on loan from Manchester United)
—	DF	ENG	Colin Woodthorpe
—	DF	WAL	Damon Searle
—	DF	SCO	Tom Bennett

No.	Pos.	Nation	Player
—	DF	SCO	Martin McIntosh
—	MF	ENG	Chris Byrne
—	MF	ENG	Paul Cook
—	MF	ENG	Kevin Cooper
—	MF	ENG	Tony Dinning
—	MF	WAL	Wayne Phillips
—	FW	ENG	Brett Angell
—	FW	ENG	Aaron Wilbraham
—	FW	IRL	Stephen Grant

=== Left club during season ===
Note: Flags indicate national team as defined under FIFA eligibility rules; some limited exceptions apply. Players may hold more than one non-FIFA nationality.

No.	Pos.	Nation	Player
—	GK	WAL	Neil Edwards (to Rochdale)
—	DF	ENG	Matthew Bound (to Swansea City)
—	MF	ENG	Chris Marsden (to Birmingham City)
—	MF	ENG	Lee Richardson (on loan from Oldham Athletic)

No.	Pos.	Nation	Player
—	MF	IRL	Eddie McGoldrick (on loan from Manchester City)
—	FW	ENG	Alun Armstrong (to Middlesbrough)
—	FW	AUS	Vasilios Kalogeracos (to Perth Glory)
