= Carlo Nash =

English footballer and coach

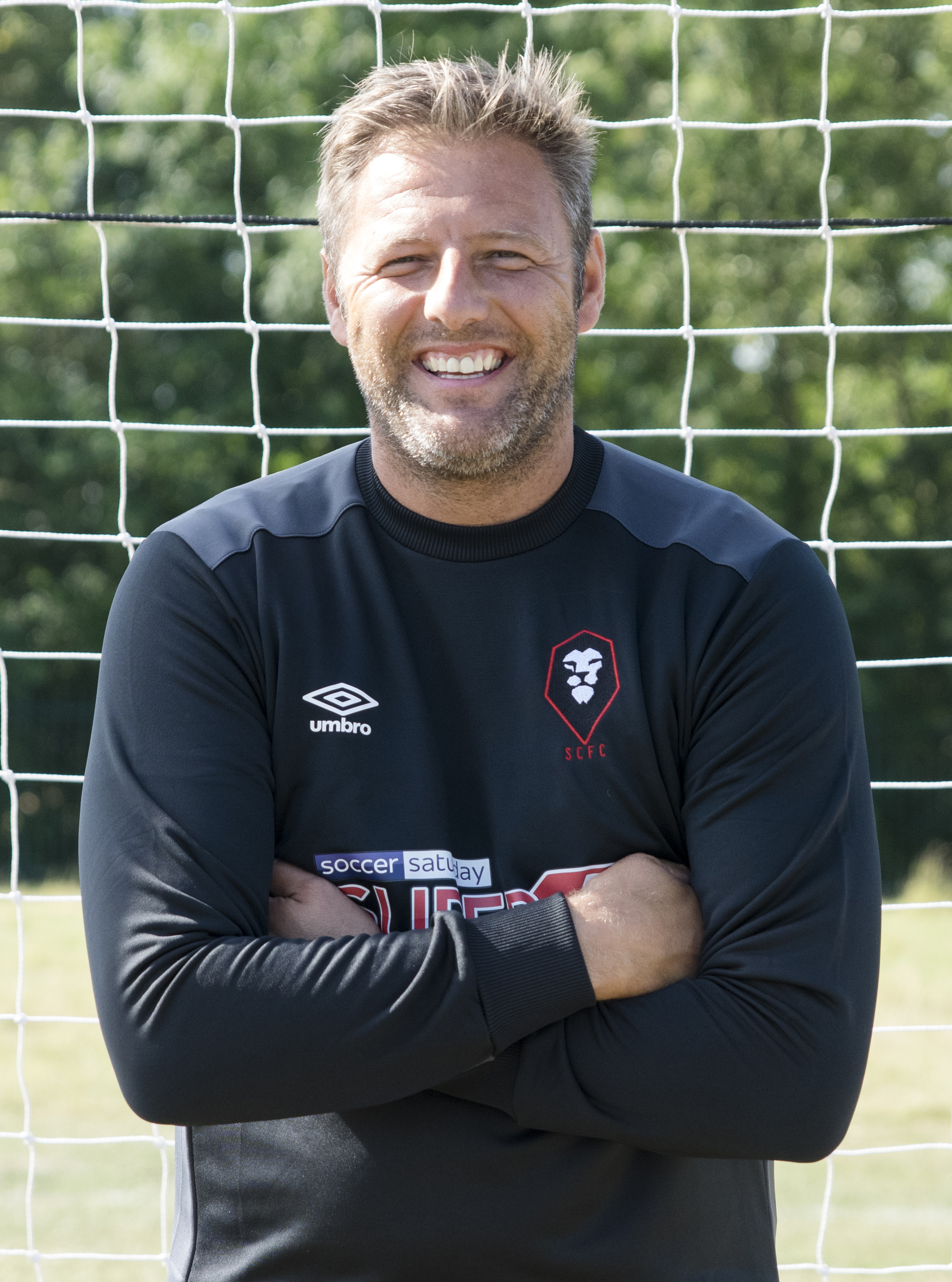
- Nash as Salford City goalkeeper coach in 2019

Personal information
- Full name: Carlo James Nash
- Date of birth: 13 September 1973 (age 53)
- Place of birth: Bolton, England
- Height: 6 ft 5 in (1.96 m)
- Position: Goalkeeper

Youth career
- Moss Bank
- 1984–1987: Manchester United

Senior career*
Years	Team	Apps	(Gls)
1993–1995	Rossendale United	53	(0)
1995–1996	Clitheroe		
1996–1998	Crystal Palace	21	(0)
1998–2001	Stockport County	89	(0)
2000–2001	→ Wolverhampton Wanderers (loan)	0	(0)
2001–2003	Manchester City	38	(0)
2003–2005	Middlesbrough	3	(0)
2005–2007	Preston North End	82	(0)
2007	→ Wigan Athletic (loan)	0	(0)
2007–2008	Wigan Athletic	0	(0)
2008	→ Stoke City (loan)	10	(0)
2008–2010	Everton	0	(0)
2010–2013	Stoke City	0	(0)
2013–2014	Norwich City	0	(0)
Total		243	(0)
- * Club domestic league appearances and goals

Carlo James Nash (born 13 September 1973) is an English former professional footballer and goalkeeper coach.

Nash started his career at North West Counties League clubs Rossendale United and Clitheroe, playing for the latter in the FA Vase final in 1996, before being signed by Crystal Palace for a fee of £35,000. He helped Palace to win promotion out of the First Division via the play-offs in 1997. He spent 1998 to 2001 with Stockport County before being sold to Manchester City for £100,000 in January 2001. He played 15 Premier League games for the club, either side of 25 appearances in the 2001–02 First Division title-winning campaign. He joined Middlesbrough for a nominal fee in August 2003 before moving on to Preston North End in March 2005. He featured 94 times for the club, playing in two unsuccessful play-off campaigns.

Nash left Preston to join Wigan Athletic for a fee of £300,000 in June 2007. However, after leaving Preston, he would play only 13 first-team games in the remaining seven years of his career. He spent time on loan at Stoke City in their Championship promotion-winning 2007–08 campaign, where he would play ten games. He otherwise spent the rest of his career as a back-up goalkeeper in the Premier League at Wigan Athletic, Everton, Stoke City and Norwich City. He picked up two FA Cup runners-up medals after being an unused substitute in the 2009 and 2011 finals, with Everton and Stoke City respectively. He went on to work as a goalkeeping coach at Oldham Athletic, Salford City and Port Vale.

== Playing career ==
=== Early career ===
Born in Bolton, Lancashire, Nash started his career at local youth club Moss Bank before he joined Manchester United's academy at the age of eleven. However, he decided to spend some years out of the game after being involved in a car accident at the age of 14. He completed his education and went on to work as a screen printer. He returned to the sport with amateur side Waterworks after a six-year absence. He joined North West Counties League side Rossendale United in 1993 and played for the club for two years. He moved on to Clitheroe, with whom he played in the final of the FA Vase at Wembley Stadium, losing 3–0 to Brigg Town. He later said that "it was a very unconventional way to get into professional football but I feel like I appreciated it more because of the way I did it rather than coming through the academy system".

=== Crystal Palace ===
In May 1996, Nash was signed by Crystal Palace manager Dave Bassett for an initial fee of £35,000 (rising to £45,000 after ten first-team games, and including a 10% sell-on fee), in what was a club record transfer for Clitheroe. He made his professional debut in the First Division on 21 September, in a 6–1 victory at Reading. He was a key player for Crystal Palace when they got promoted to the Premier League in the 1996–97 season, keeping a clean sheet in the play-off final victory over Sheffield United. He later said that: "I played in the FA Vase final for Clitheroe in front of around 7,000 people so to return and play in front of 90,000 people was an unbelievable feeling". However, in June 1997 Palace manager Steve Coppell signed Kevin Miller from Watford and he was their first-choice for Crystal Palace's season in the Premier League, and as a result Nash didn't play at all in the 1997–98 relegation season and decided to leave Selhurst Park.

=== Stockport County ===
Nash joined Stockport County on a free transfer on 3 June 1998. A Stockport-based Indian restaurant gave Nash a complimentary meal every time he kept a clean sheet during the 1998–99 campaign, which left him with four free meals in February after he kept four consecutive clean sheets throughout the month. He featured 47 times in his debut season and then played 42 matches under Andy Kilner in the 1999–2000 season. Stockport loaned Nash to Wolverhampton Wanderers in December 2000 to provide cover for Michael Oakes. West Bromwich Albion agreed a fee of £100,000 for Nash but failed to agree personal terms after manager Gary Megson said that Nash made excessive wage demands and insisted on expensive agent fees. Megson had originally signed him at Stockport before taking the West Brom job.

=== Manchester City ===
On 11 January 2001, Nash joined Manchester City on a four-and-a-half-year deal for a fee of £100,000; manager Joe Royle stated that "I think as a big club and as a Premiership club we need three goalkeepers". City lost 4–0 to Arsenal on his Premier League debut at Maine Road on 11 April 2001; he described the experience as a "baptism of fire". During Kevin Keegan's management of Manchester City, Nash and Nicky Weaver were rotated frequently as starting goalkeeper. Nash started the 2001–02 season as the first-choice goalkeeper, but had to settle for a place on the bench after getting injured in the second league game of the season. Nash later regained his first-team place after Weaver picked up an injury. City secured an immediate promotion as champions of the First Division in 2001–02, with Nash playing 23 of the club's 46 league games. The arrival of Peter Schmeichel in June 2002 saw Nash return to an understudy role. However, he still featured ten times during the 2002–03 campaign, including in a 1–1 draw with Manchester derby rivals Manchester United at Old Trafford on 9 February.

=== Middlesbrough ===
Nash was sold to Premier League club Middlesbrough for a nominal fee in August 2003, with the club in need of a replacement for the departing Mark Crossley. His only appearance of the season was on 8 November in a 2–0 win at Aston Villa, as Mark Schwarzer was away with his sick daughter. Manager Steve McClaren praised him for his performance. He credited goalkeeping coach Paul Barron for his development. However, he was absent from the matchday squad for the 2004 League Cup final as Brad Jones was selected as the back-up goalkeeper. He was unable to displace Schwarzer and opted for a move away from the Riverside Stadium in search of first-team football.

=== Preston North End ===
Nash moved down a division to join Preston North End on a three-and-a-half-year contract in March 2005; the transfer fee had the potential to rise to £175,000.

The club finished the 2004–05 season in the Championship play-off places, and lost the final by a single goal to West Ham United on 30 May. Nash kept a club record 24 clean sheets throughout the 2005–06 season. Manager Billy Davies again led PNE to the play-offs, where they, this time, were beaten by Leeds United at the semi-final stage.

Despite Davies' departure in the summer and interest from Premier League Fulham, Nash began the 2006–07 campaign as first choice as Preston continued their good form from the previous season under new manager Paul Simpson, briefly topping the second tier table for the first time since 1964 in the November.

However a month later, Nash was heavily criticised for being at fault for 3 of West Bromich Albion's goals in Preston's 4-2 defeat at The Hawthorns and following renewed interest from Fulham, he handed in a transfer request citing his then girlfriend was 'homesick' for London. Nash was subsequently dropped a few games later by Preston manager Paul Simpson. playing his final game for Preston in a 3-1 win over Stoke. His departure was acrimonious, with Simpson telling the press that Nash had shown a "lack of respect for both Preston and his team-mates". He played a total of 94 games during his three seasons at Deepdale, 42 of which ended in wins, keeping 41 clean sheets.

=== Later career ===
Despite an expected moved to the capital following Nash's comments regarding his partner, Nash moved just 11 miles south joining Wigan Athletic on a month-long emergency loan in February 2007, due to injuries to their first and second-choice goalkeepers, Chris Kirkland and Mike Pollitt. Following the conclusion of that loan deal, Nash returned to Preston, where he was transfer-listed on 8 May. Wigan signed him permanently to a two-year deal for a fee of £300,000 on 27 June 2007. However, he did not feature under Chris Hutchings, the manager who had signed him, and he broke his ankle during training in November 2007. On 4 March 2008, Stoke City manager Tony Pulis signed Nash on an emergency loan deal for the remainder of the 2007–08 season following Márton Fülöp's recall to Sunderland. Nash played a vital part in Stoke's promotion to the Premier League with a penalty save against Watford and a number of important saves on the final day of the season against Leicester City. Upon reporting for pre-season training at the start of the 2008–09 campaign, Wigan manager Steve Bruce exclaimed to Nash that "I didn't realise you were back!" as he had expected Nash to instead report for training at the Britannia Stadium. Nash made his only Wigan appearance on 26 August 2008 in the second round of the League Cup, in a 4–0 win over Notts County at the JJB Stadium.

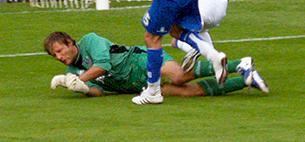
Nash playing for Everton in 2009

Nash moved to Everton – the team he supported as a boy – as reserve goalkeeper to Tim Howard, signing on a two-year contract on 1 September 2008. Manager David Moyes had struggled to find a long-term back-up for Howard. He made his only appearance in a Europa League dead rubber group tie at Goodison Park to Belarusian club BATE Borisov on 17 December, which Everton lost 1–0. This appearance ended a run of 65 non-playing substitute appearances on the bench. He was on the bench for the 2009 FA Cup final at Wembley Stadium, which his team lost 2–1 to Chelsea.

Following Nash's release from Everton he returned to Stoke after signing a one-year contract in July 2010, providing back-up to Thomas Sørensen and Asmir Begović. On 24 August, Nash played what would prove to be his final game in a 2–1 League Cup win over Shrewsbury Town. He signed a one-year contract extension in January 2011, and was subsequently released at the end of the 2012–13 season after picking up another FA Cup runners-up medal after sitting on the bench in Stoke's 2011 final defeat to Manchester City.

Nash joined Norwich City on 10 July 2013 as a replacement third-choice goalkeeper for Jed Steer, providing cover for John Ruddy and Mark Bunn. Norwich were relegated out of the Premier League at the end of the 2013–14 season, and despite not playing a game Nash had led the fan poll for the club's Player of the Season award as supporters vented their frustrations at the team's performances; Nash said that he would "graciously decline it and of course give it to someone who has earned it".

== Coaching career ==
In July 2016, Nash was appointed goalkeeping coach at League One club Oldham Athletic by incoming manager Stephen Robinson. He left Oldham in 2018 to join former Preston teammate Graham Alexander in the National League at Salford City. He joined Port Vale as the club's new goalkeeping coach in July 2022. He was interim goalkeeping coach at Accrington Stanley for the 2024/25 season. He currently works as Head of Goalkeeping for Premier Goalkeeping Academy covering the areas in South Manchester and Cheshire.

== Personal life ==
Nash is an enthusiastic travel photographer in his spare time, and set up a travel book publishing company called 'Luxury Backpackers' with his then-wife Jill. Nash is a devout Christian and said in an interview with the Church Times, "I find that being a Christian helps me to deal with disappointing moments in football a lot better". Nash's paternal grandmother was Italian. Nash is also interested in languages, having learned French, German, Italian and Spanish, and practiced Chinese when he shared a room with Sun Jihai at Manchester City. He has two daughters from his marriage to his ex-wife Jill. He also has two other daughters with his fiancée, Stacey

In February 2014, Nash was stopped by police on a dual carriageway in Norfolk after being caught driving at 140 miles per hour (230 km/h) and went on to receive a 34-week driving ban; it was heard in court that he was in negative equity following an acrimonious divorce. In July 2015, Nash was cleared at Chester Crown Court of a charge of stalking his ex-wife, as the prosecution offered no evidence; he was compensated for his legal costs.

== Career statistics ==
Appearances and goals by club, season and competition
Club	Season	League			FA Cup		League Cup		UEFA Cup		Play-offs		Total	
Club	Season	Division	Apps	Goals	Apps	Goals	Apps	Goals	Apps	Goals	Apps	Goals	Apps	Goals
Crystal Palace	1996–97	First Division	21	0	0	0	1	0	—		3	0	25	0
Crystal Palace	1997–98	Premier League	0	0	0	0	0	0	—		—		0	0
Crystal Palace	Total		21	0	0	0	1	0	0	0	3	0	25	0
Stockport County	1998–99	First Division	43	0	2	0	2	0	—		—		47	0
Stockport County	1999–2000	First Division	38	0	1	0	3	0	—		—		42	0
Stockport County	2000–01	First Division	8	0	1	0	0	0	—		—		9	0
Stockport County	Total		89	0	4	0	5	0	0	0	0	0	98	0
Wolverhampton Wanderers (loan)	2000–01	First Division	0	0	0	0	0	0	—		—		0	0
Manchester City	2000–01	Premier League	6	0	0	0	0	0	—		—		6	0
Manchester City	2001–02	First Division	23	0	1	0	1	0	—		—		25	0
Manchester City	2002–03	Premier League	9	0	0	0	1	0	—		—		10	0
Manchester City	Total		38	0	1	0	2	0	0	0	0	0	41	0
Middlesbrough	2003–04	Premier League	1	0	0	0	0	0	—		—		1	0
Middlesbrough	2004–05	Premier League	2	0	0	0	2	0	0	0	—		4	0
Middlesbrough	Total		3	0	0	0	2	0	0	0	0	0	5	0
Preston North End	2004–05	Championship	7	0	0	0	0	0	—		3	0	10	0
Preston North End	2005–06	Championship	46	0	4	0	1	0	—		2	0	53	0
Preston North End	2006–07	Championship	29	0	1	0	1	0	—		—		31	0
Preston North End	Total		82	0	5	0	2	0	0	0	5	0	94	0
Wigan Athletic (loan)	2007–08	Premier League	0	0	0	0	0	0	—		—		0	0
Wigan Athletic	2008–09	Premier League	0	0	0	0	1	0	—		—		1	0
Wigan Athletic	Total		0	0	0	0	1	0	0	0	0	0	1	0
Stoke City (loan)	2007–08	Championship	10	0	0	0	0	0	—		—		10	0
Everton	2009–10	Premier League	0	0	0	0	0	0	1	0	—		1	0
Stoke City	2010–11	Premier League	0	0	0	0	1	0	—		—		1	0
Stoke City	2011–12	Premier League	0	0	0	0	0	0	0	0	—		0	0
Stoke City	2012–13	Premier League	0	0	0	0	0	0	—		—		0	0
Stoke City	Total		0	0	0	0	1	0	0	0	0	0	1	0
Norwich City	2013–14	Premier League	0	0	0	0	0	0	—		—		0	0
Career total			243	0	10	0	14	0	1	0	8	0	276	0

== Honours ==
Clitheroe

- FA Vase runner-up: 1996

Crystal Palace

- Football League First Division play-offs: 1997

Manchester City

- Football League First Division: 2001–02

Stoke City

- Football League Championship second-place promotion: 2007–08
- FA Cup runner-up: 2010–11

Everton

- FA Cup runner-up: 2008–09
