= 2001–02 Wigan Athletic F.C. season =

Wigan Athletic
2001–02 season
- Manager: Paul Jewell
- Stadium: JJB Stadium
- Second Division: 10th
- FA Cup: First round
- League Cup: First round
- Football League Trophy: First round
- Top goalscorer: Andy Liddell (18)

During the 2001–02 English football season, Wigan Athletic F.C. competed in the Football League Second Division.

== Background ==
In the 2000–01 season, Wigan finished in the playoffs for the third consecutive season, but once again missed out on promotion, losing in the play-off semi finals to Reading. Following the sudden departure of manager Steve Bruce at the end of the season, Paul Jewell was appointed as his replacement.

== Transfers ==
Following the departures of several players from the previous season, Jewell spent heavily in the summer in an attempt to build a squad capable of gaining promotion.

Shortly before the transfer deadline, Wigan signed Nathan Ellington for a club record transfer fee of £1.2 million.

At the end of the season, defender Arjan de Zeeuw turned down a new contract at the club and left on a free transfer to join First Division side Portsmouth.

=== In ===
Player	Position	From	Fee	Date	Notes
Peter Kennedy	MF	Watford	£300,000	18 July 2001	
Jason De Vos	DF	Dundee United	£500,000	30 July 2001	
Ian Nolan	DF	Bradford City	Free	10 August 2001	
Gábor Bukrán	MF	Walsall	Free	10 August 2001	
Stewart Kerr	GK	Celtic	£250,000	25 August 2001	
Paul Dalglish	FW	Norwich City	Free	25 August 2001	
Tony Dinning	MF	Wolverhampton Wanderers	£750,000	10 September 2001	
Matt Jackson	DF	Norwich City	Free	22 November 2001	
John Filan	GK	Blackburn Rovers	£600,000	14 December 2001	
Gary Teale	MF	Ayr United	£200,000	14 December 2001	
Nathan Ellington	FW	Bristol Rovers	£1,200,000	28 March 2002	
Jason Jarrett	MF	Bury	£75,000	28 March 2002	

=== Out ===
Player	Position	To	Fee	Date	Notes
Roy Carroll	GK	Manchester United	£2,500,000	27 July 2001	
Kevin Nicholls	MF	Luton Town	£25,000	5 August 2001	
Gábor Bukrán	MF	SV Salzburg	Released	18 August 2001	
Kevin Sharp	DF	Wrexham	Free	1 November 2001	
Alan McLoughlin	MF	Rochdale	Free	24 December 2001	
Simon Haworth	FW	Tranmere Rovers	£125,000	1 March 2002	
Scott Tynan	GK	Nottingham Forest	Released	19 April 2002	
Derek Stillie	GK	Dunfermline Athletic	Free	22 May 2002	
Arjan de Zeeuw	DF	Portsmouth	Free	7 June 2002	
Pat McGibbon	DF	Tranmere Rovers	Released	30 June 2002	
Ian Nolan	DF	Southport	Released	30 June 2002	
Ian Kilford	MF	Scunthorpe United	Released	30 June 2002	
Ben Kay	MF		Released	30 June 2002	
Ian Johnson	MF	Southport	Released	30 June 2002	
Paul Dalglish	FW	Blackpool	Released	30 June 2002	

=== Loans in ===
Player	Pos	From	Date	Duration	Notes
Dariusz Adamczuk	MF	Rangers	10 August 2001	Three months	
Matt Jackson	DF	Norwich City	20 October 2001	One month	
Jeff Kenna	DF	Blackburn Rovers	2 November 2001	One month	
Paul Cook	MF	Burnley	3 December 2001	One month	
Gary Croft	DF	Ipswich Town	16 January 2002	One month	

=== Loans out ===
Player	Pos	To	Date	Duration	Notes
Neil Roberts	FW	Hull City	25 January 2002	One month	
Pat McGibbon	DF	Scunthorpe United	15 February 2002	One month	
Tony Dinning	MF	Stoke City	27 March 2002	End of season	

== Pre-season ==
Date	Opponent	Venue	Result	Scorers	Notes
24 July 2001	St Mirren	A	2–1		
28 July 2001	Ayr United	A	0–4		
31 July 2001	Stockport County	A	3–1		
2 August 2001	St Helens Town	H	3–0		
4 August 2001	Leigh RMI	A	2–3		
7 August 2001	Everton	H	1–6		

== League ==
Wigan Athletic's league season started on 11 August 2001, with a 1–1 draw against Brentford. The season started poorly, and only the team's away form kept them out of the relegation zone. Despite the club's poor results, chairman Dave Whelan publicly backed manager Paul Jewell, and blamed the previous two managers for the club's current position.

Results improved following a 6–1 win against Stoke City in November, and the club eventually finished in a mid-table position.

=== Results ===
Wigan Athletic's score comes first

Legend

Win	Draw	Loss

Game	Date	Opponent	Venue	Result	Attendance	Scorers	Notes
1	11 August 2001	Brentford	H	1–1	5,952	McCulloch	
2	18 August 2001	Brighton & Hove Albion	A	1–2	6,518	McCulloch	
3	25 August 2001	Bristol City	H	1–2	6,231	Ashcroft	
4	8 September 2001	Bury	A	2–0	4,175	Billy (o.g.), Haworth	
5	15 September 2001	Wycombe Wanderers	A	0–1	5,400		
6	18 September 2001	Huddersfield Town	H	1–0	5,717	Haworth	
7	22 September 2001	Queens Park Rangers	H	1–2	6,686	Dinning	
8	25 September 2001	Cambridge United	A	2–2	2,969	Roberts (2)	
9	29 September 2001	Blackpool	A	1–3	5,279	Ashcroft (pen)	
10	9 October 2001	Bournemouth	A	0–2	2,908		
11	12 October 2001	Cardiff City	A	2–2	11,072	McGibbon, Haworth	
12	20 October 2001	Wrexham	H	2–3	5,979	Dinning, Haworth	
13	23 October 2001	Tranmere Rovers	A	2–1	9,030	Haworth (2)	
14	27 October 2001	Port Vale	H	0–1	5,634		
15	3 November 2001	Peterborough United	A	2–0	5,405	Haworth (2)	
16	9 November 2001	Colchester United	H	2–3	5,735	Fitzgerald (o.g.), Liddell	
17	13 November 2001	Stoke City	H	6–1	7,047	Dinning, Liddell, de Zeeuw, Dalglish, Ashcroft (pen), Kenna	
18	20 November 2001	Chesterfield	H	1–1	4,071	Edwards (own goal)	
19	24 November 2001	Northampton Town	A	2–0	4,267	Dinning, Haworth	
20	1 December 2001	Swindon Town	H	1–0	5,635	Liddell	
21	11 December 2001	Notts County	H	1–1	3,827	Liddell	
22	15 December 2001	Oldham Athletic	A	1–1	6,407	Liddell	
23	22 December 2001	Reading	A	1–1	15,808	Haworth	
24	26 December 2001	Bury	H	1–1	6,751	Liddell	
25	29 December 2001	Bournemouth	H	0–0	5,011		
26	5 January 2002	Bristol City	A	2–2	9,991	McCulloch, De Vos	
27	12 January 2002	Brighton & Hove Albion	H	3–0	6,203	Liddell (3, 1 pen)	
28	19 January 2002	Brentford	A	1–0	5,549	Liddell	
29	22 January 2002	Reading	A	0–2	5,546		
30	26 January 2002	Stoke City	A	2–2	13,361	Green, Dinning	
31	2 February 2002	Blackpool	H	0–1	7,357		
32	9 February 2002	Wrexham	A	0–2	4,153		
33	16 February 2002	Cardiff City	H	4–0	5,487	McCulloch, De Vos (2), de Zeeuw	
34	19 February 2002	Notts County	A	3–1	3,358	McCulloch, Teale, Dalglish	
35	23 February 2002	Wycombe Wanderers	H	0–0	4,743		
36	26 February 2002	Queens Park Rangers	A	1–1	8,519	De Vos	
37	2 March 2002	Huddersfield Town	A	0–0	12,844		
38	5 March 2002	Cambridge United	H	4–1	3,535	Liddell (3, 1 pen), McCulloch	
39	9 March 2002	Oldham Athletic	H	1–0	7,389	Liddell	
40	16 March 2002	Swindon Town	A	1–1	6,226	Green	
41	23 March 2002	Tranmere Rovers	H	1–2	7,783	Liddell (pen)	
42	30 March 2002	Port Vale	A	0–1	4,359		
43	1 April 2002	Peterborough United	H	2–1	4,497	Liddell (2)	
44	6 April 2002	Chesterfield	A	2–1	3,896	Liddell, Ellington	
45	13 April 2002	Northampton Town	H	3–0	5,938	De Vos, Ellington, Green	
46	20 April 2002	Colchester United	A	2–2	3,672	Roberts (2)	

=== Final league table ===
Pos	Team	Pld	W	D	L	GF	GA	GD	Pts
8	Queens Park Rangers	46	19	14	13	60	49	+11	71
9	Oldham Athletic	46	18	16	12	77	65	+12	70
10	Wigan Athletic	46	16	16	14	66	51	+15	64
11	Wycombe Wanderers	46	17	13	16	58	64	−6	64
12	Tranmere Rovers	46	16	15	15	63	60	+3	63

Rules for classification: In the Football League goals scored (GF) takes precedence over goal difference (GD).

== Cups ==
=== FA Cup ===
Wigan played at home against non-league club Canvey Island in the first round of the FA Cup. Wigan lost 1–0, and had two players sent-off during the game. The result was considered one of the biggest upsets of the round.

Round	Date	Opponent	Venue	Result	Attendance	Goalscorers	Notes
First	17 November 2001	Canvey Island	H	0–1	3,671		

=== League Cup ===
Round	Date	Opponent	Venue	Result	Attendance	Goalscorers	Notes
First	21 August 2001	Blackpool	A	2–3	4,237	Brannan, Haworth	

=== Football League Trophy ===
Wigan suffered a heavy defeat in the first round of the Football League Trophy, losing 1–5 against Wrexham. Manager Paul Jewell later recalled that chairman Dave Whelan confronted the players after the game, informing them that Jewell would be staying at the club and that the players would be held accountable if results did not improve.

Round	Date	Opponent	Venue	Result	Attendance	Goalscorers	Notes
First (Northern)	16 October 2001	Wrexham	A	1–5	1,550	Hill (o.g.)	

== Squad statistics ==
Squad at end of season

=== Appearances and goals ===
No.	Pos	Nat	Player	Total		Division Two		FA Cup		League Cup		League Trophy	
No.	Pos	Nat	Player	Apps	Goals	Apps	Goals	Apps	Goals	Apps	Goals	Apps	Goals
1	GK	(Australia) AUS	John Filan	25	0	25	0	0	0	0	0	0	0
2	DF	(Canada) CAN	Jason De Vos	21	5	19+1	5	0	0	1	0	0	0
4	DF	(Northern Ireland) NIR	Pat McGibbon	21	1	18	1	1	0	1	0	1	0
5	DF	(Scotland) SCO	Stephen McMillan	29	0	29	0	0	0	0	0	0	0
6	DF	(Netherlands) NED	Arjan de Zeeuw	45	2	42	2	1	0	1	0	1	0
7	MF	(Scotland) SCO	Andy Liddell	36	18	33+1	18	1	0	0	0	0+1	0
8	DF	(England) ENG	Ian Nolan	8	0	5+3	0	0	0	0	0	0	0
9	FW	(England) ENG	Nathan Ellington	3	2	3	2	0	0	0	0	0	0
10	FW	(England) ENG	Lee Ashcroft	17	3	14+2	3	1	0	0	0	0	0
11	FW	(Scotland) SCO	Lee McCulloch	36	6	24+10	6	1	0	0	0	0+1	0
12	FW	(Wales) WAL	Neil Roberts	18	4	5+12	4	0	0	0	0	1	0
14	DF	(England) ENG	Scott Green	41	3	35+4	3	1	0	0	0	1	0
15	DF	(England) ENG	Paul Mitchell	25	0	16+7	0	0	0	1	0	0+1	0
16	GK	(Scotland) SCO	Derek Stillie	16	0	13	0	1	0	1	0	1	0
17	MF	(Scotland) SCO	Gary Teale	23	1	22+1	1	0	0	0	0	0	0
18	MF	(England) ENG	Ian Kilford	22	0	7+13	0	0+1	0	0	0	1	0
19	MF	(England) ENG	Jason Jarrett	5	0	5	0	0	0	0	0	0	0
20	MF	(England) ENG	Ged Brannan	35	1	31+2	0	0	0	1	1	1	0
21	MF	(England) ENG	Tony Dinning	34	5	32+1	5	1	0	0	0	0	0
22	MF	(Northern Ireland) NIR	Peter Kennedy	33	0	29+2	0	1	0	0	0	1	0
23	DF	(England) ENG	Matt Jackson	26	0	26	0	0	0	0	0	0	0
25	DF	(England) ENG	Ben Kay	0	0	0	0	0	0	0	0	0	0
26	MF	(England) ENG	Ian Johnson	0	0	0	0	0	0	0	0	0	0
27	GK	(Scotland) SCO	Stewart Kerr	8	0	8	0	0	0	0	0	0	0
28	FW	(England) ENG	Greg Traynor	2	0	0+1	0	0	0	1	0	0	0
29	FW	(England) ENG	David Moore	1	0	0	0	0	0	1	0	0	0
30	DF	(England) ENG	Kieran Charnock	0	0	0	0	0	0	0	0	0	0
31	FW	(Scotland) SCO	Paul Dalglish	30	2	17+12	2	1	0	0	0	0	0
32	DF	(England) ENG	Ian Pendlebury	4	0	4	0	0	0	0	0	0	0
33	GK	(England) ENG	Scott Tynan	0	0	0	0	0	0	0	0	0	0
34	MF	(England) ENG	Paul Santus	1	0	0+1	0	0	0	0	0	0	0
35	DF	(England) ENG	Leighton Baines	0	0	0	0	0	0	0	0	0	0
Players who appeared for Wigan and left during the season:
3	DF	(England) ENG	Kevin Sharp	4	0	1+1	0	0	0	1	0	1	0
3	DF	(Republic of Ireland) IRL	Jeff Kenna	7	1	6	1	1	0	0	0	0	0
3	DF	(England) ENG	Gary Croft	7	0	7	0	0	0	0	0	0	0
9	FW	(Wales) WAL	Simon Haworth	29	11	19+8	10	0	0	1	1	1	0
17	MF	(Republic of Ireland) IRL	Alan McLoughlin	4	0	1+2	0	0	0	0	0	1	0
23	MF	(Hungary) HUN	Gábor Bukrán	1	0	1	0	0	0	0	0	0	0
24	MF	(Poland) POL	Dariusz Adamczuk	4	0	3	0	0	0	1	0	0	0
24	MF	(England) ENG	Paul Cook	6	0	6	0	0	0	0	0	0	0
