= Vänersborgs IF =

Swedish football club

- Full name: Vänersborgs Idrottsförening
- Ground: Vänersvallen; Vänersborg; Sweden
- Head coach: Andy Kilner
- League: Ettan Södra
- 2019: Division 2 Norra Götaland, 9th

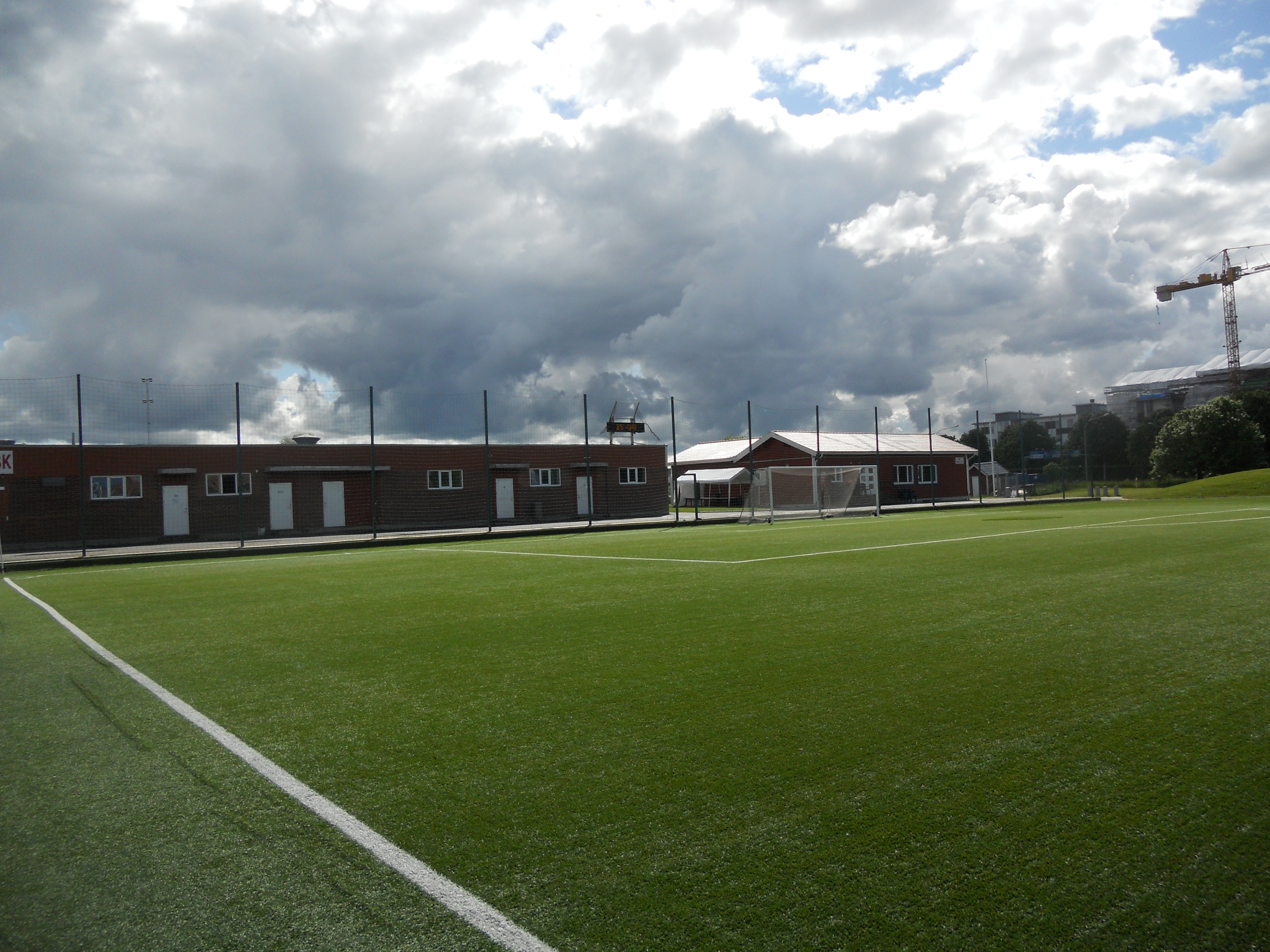
The home ground Vänersvallen with the clubhouse at the right.

Vänersborgs IF is a Swedish football club located in Vänersborg. The club was founded in 1906. The current men's football team head coach is Andy Kilner.

== Background ==
The club was founded in 1906. In the 1940s, it became the first team from Västergötland which made a national impact in bandy, but has since given up this sport.

Vänersborgs IF currently (2021) plays in Division 1 Södra which is the third tier of Swedish football. They play their home matches at Vänersvallen in Vänersborg; the football ground has a capacity of around 2000 people.

The club is affiliated to Västergötlands Fotbollförbund.

== Current squad ==
As of 8 August 2023

Note: Flags indicate national team as defined under FIFA eligibility rules; some limited exceptions apply. Players may hold more than one non-FIFA nationality.

No.	Pos.	Nation	Player
1	GK	SWE	Ali Hasan
2	DF	USA	Alex Mapp
5	DF	SWE	Milos Andelkovic
6	MF	SWE	Alexander Karlsson
7	FW	SWE	Ylli Podrimcaku
8	MF	SWE	David Björnsson
9	FW	SWE	Isaac Shears
10	MF	SWE	Kim Dickson
11	MF	SWE	Oskar Jansson
12	MF	SWE	Eskil Thor
13	MF	SWE	Eric Kjellsson
14	DF	ESP	Pol Hérnandez
15	DF	IRL	Declan Watters

No.	Pos.	Nation	Player
16	MF	SWE	Viktor Nilsen
17	MF	SWE	Youssef Fayad
18	FW	SWE	Valon Gashi
19	DF	SWE	William Snällström
20	MF	USA	Colin Biros
21	DF	SWE	Filip Sterner
22	FW	SWE	Yahye Abdi
23	FW	SWE	Julius Thulin
24	MF	SWE	Wilmer Hagemann
25	MF	SWE	Elias Karlsson
26	DF	SWE	Ali Al-Habobi
27	GK	GEO	Besarion Kodalaev
