= Tony Dinning =

English footballer

Personal information
- Full name: Tony Dinning
- Date of birth: 12 April 1975 (age 51)
- Place of birth: Wallsend, England
- Height: 6 ft 0 in (1.83 m)
- Position: Midfielder

Youth career
- Wallsend Boys Club
- 1993–1994: Newcastle United

Senior career*
| Years | Team | Apps | (Gls) |
| 1993 | → Djurgårdens IF (loan) | 2 | (0) |
| 1994–2000 | Stockport County | 191 | (25) |
| 2000–2001 | Wolverhampton Wanderers | 35 | (6) |
| 2001 | → Wigan Athletic (loan) | 1 | (0) |
| 2001–2004 | Wigan Athletic | 83 | (12) |
| 2002 | → Stoke City (loan) | 5 | (0) |
| 2003 | → Walsall (loan) | 5 | (0) |
| 2004 | → Blackpool (loan) | 10 | (3) |
| 2004 | → Ipswich Town (loan) | 7 | (0) |
| 2004 | → Bristol City (loan) | 5 | (0) |
| 2004–2005 | Bristol City | 14 | (0) |
| 2005 | → Port Vale (loan) | 7 | (3) |
| 2005–2006 | Port Vale | 35 | (2) |
| 2006–2007 | Stockport County | 32 | (2) |
| 2007–2009 | Chester City | 24 | (2) |
| 2009 | → Grays Athletic (loan) | | |
| 2009 | → Gateshead (loan) | | |
| 2009 | Hednesford Town | 6 | (1) |
| 2009–2010 | Stafford Rangers | | |
| 2010–2011 | Bridgnorth Town | | |
| Total | | 462 | (56) |
- * Club domestic league appearances and goals

Tony Dinning (born 12 April 1975) is an English former football midfielder who spent 16 years of an 18-year career in the Football League, making 515 appearances in league and cup competitions.

A former Newcastle United trainee, he made his name at Stockport County between 1994 and 2000, helping the club to win promotion, he played 219 games in league and cup. Following a £700,000 move to Wolverhampton Wanderers, he was sold to Wigan Athletic for £750,000 in 2001. Helping Wigan to promotion, he also enjoyed loan spells out to Stoke City (who he also helped to win promotion), Walsall, Blackpool, and Ipswich Town, before he signed with Bristol City in 2004. He moved on to Port Vale the following year, taking up the captain's armband. He returned to Stockport for one season before signing with Chester City in 2007. In 2009, he was loaned out to Grays Athletic and Gateshead before dropping out of the Football League permanently after signing with Stafford Rangers via Hednesford Town. He retired in 2011 after a spell with Bridgnorth Town.

== Career ==
=== Early career and Stockport County ===
Dinning began his career at Newcastle United in 1993 after coming through Wallsend Boys Club. During his time at the club, he was loaned out to the Swedish team Djurgården in a player exchange program, where his first game ended in him producing an own goal. Dinning failed to make an appearance for Newcastle before being released. He joined Stockport County after his release in June 1994. He played twenty league games in County's Second Division promotion-winning 1996–97 campaign. County also reached the semi-finals of the League Cup, where he was sent off in a defeat to Middlesbrough. He cemented his place in the Edgeley Park first XI throughout their subsequent First Division campaigns, culminating in him picking up the Player of the Season award for the 1999–2000 season, in what turned out to be his final season with the club. On 7 December 1999, he scored a penalty kick to secure Stockport their first win over Manchester City at Maine Road. He played 219 games for the club and scored 28 goals, 13 of which came in the 1999–2000 season.

=== Wolverhampton Wanderers ===
In September 2000, he moved to Wolverhampton Wanderers for £700,000. However, the 2000–01 season was not a success and manager Colin Lee was sacked in December. Dinning remained at Molineux for less than a year; ironically, it was his former Stockport manager Dave Jones who decided he had no future at Wolves and sold him to Paul Jewell's Wigan Athletic for £750,000.

=== Wigan Athletic ===
Finding his form at Wigan, he was still soon loaned out to fellow Second Division side Stoke City for the closing months of the 2001–02 campaign, where he played in their play-off final triumph over Brentford. He returned to his parent club the following season, and played 44 games, helping them to win promotion as champions. However, he found himself out of favour in Wigan's subsequent second tier seasons, leading to loan spells at Walsall, Blackpool (who he captained), Ipswich Town, and finally, Bristol City, whom he eventually joined on a free transfer. At Blackpool he started the final as Blackpool won the 2003–04 Football League Trophy with a 2–0 victory over Southend United at the Millennium Stadium.

=== Bristol City, Port Vale and return to Stockport ===
With just twenty appearances, his time with Bristol City proved short-lived, and he moved to Port Vale on loan at the end of the 2004–05 season, signing permanently the following summer. He played 41 games in the 2005–06 campaign, also taking up the captain's armband. In May 2006, he agreed a deal to re-join former club Stockport County. Manager Jim Gannon described Dinning as a "born leader", and utilized him in 32 league games.

=== Chester City ===
In August 2007, Dinning had his contract with Stockport cancelled by mutual agreement, due to lack of first-team opportunities. After a month spent training with Chester City, he finally joined on 5 October 2007. He made his debut two days later in a 3–1 win over Shrewsbury Town and scored his first goal for the club from the penalty spot in Chester's 1–0 win at Lincoln City the following month. Later in the season, Dinning and teammate, Paul Butler, became embroiled in a dispute with the club and manager Simon Davies. He remained at the club into 2008–09. However, Dinning was restricted to just two appearances in the opening half of the campaign, including a sending off shortly after coming on in a 1–0 defeat at AFC Bournemouth. He was allowed to join Scottish Premier League side Inverness Caledonian Thistle on trial in January 2009. He joined Conference National club, Grays Athletic on loan on 24 February 2009. On 26 March 2009, Dinning joined Conference North side Gateshead on loan until the end of the season.

=== Later career ===
After being released by Chester in May 2009, he joined Hednesford Town in the Southern Football League Premier Division, but soon left for Conference North club Stafford Rangers after Hednesford manager Dean Edwards left the club. He got into a car accident in December, and was sidelined for a few weeks due to a whiplash injury he sustained. Captaining the side for a handful of games when Nick Wellecomme was absent, he fell out of favour by the end of the season, after missing a penalty in an "embarrassing" ten men defeat to ten-man Ilkeston. Dinning left the club in the summer after falling out with manager Mark Wright.

In July 2010, he joined Midland Football Alliance club Bridgnorth Town as a player-coach, working under Lee Mills. Making 13 appearances for Bridgnorth, at the end of their first season the pair quit the club, citing a wish to move on to a new challenge.

== Later and personal life ==
Dinning worked as a bathroom fitter and ran his own company, RT Bathrooms. He has three children: Ted, Jessie, and Billy.

== Career statistics ==
Appearances and goals by club, season and competition
| Club | Season | League | | | National cup (Note: Includes FA Cup, Svenska Cupen) | | League cup (Note: Includes Football League Cup) | | Other | | Total | |
| Club | Season | Division | Apps | Goals | Apps | Goals | Apps | Goals | Apps | Goals | Apps | Goals |
|---|---|---|---|---|---|---|---|---|---|---|---|---|
| Stockport County | 1994–95 | Second Division | 40 | 1 | 4 | 0 | 4 | 0 | 0 | 0 | 48 | 1 |
| Stockport County | 1995–96 | Second Division | 10 | 1 | 0 | 0 | 0 | 0 | 0 | 0 | 10 | 1 |
| Stockport County | 1996–97 | Second Division | 20 | 2 | 2 | 0 | 4 | 0 | 0 | 0 | 26 | 2 |
| Stockport County | 1997–98 | First Division | 30 | 4 | 2 | 0 | 4 | 1 | — | | 36 | 5 |
| Stockport County | 1998–99 | First Division | 41 | 5 | 2 | 0 | 2 | 0 | — | | 45 | 5 |
| Stockport County | 1999–2000 | First Division | 44 | 12 | 1 | 0 | 2 | 1 | — | | 47 | 13 |
| Stockport County | 2000–01 | First Division | 6 | 0 | 0 | 0 | 1 | 1 | — | | 7 | 1 |
| Stockport County | Total | | 191 | 25 | 11 | 0 | 17 | 3 | 0 | 0 | 219 | 28 |
| Djurgården (loan) | 1993 | Division 1 Norra | 2 | 0 | 0 | 0 | — | | 0 | 0 | 2 | 0 |
| Wolverhampton Wanderers | 2000–01 | First Division | 31 | 6 | 1 | 0 | 0 | 0 | — | | 32 | 6 |
| Wolverhampton Wanderers | 2001–02 | First Division | 4 | 0 | 0 | 0 | 1 | 1 | 0 | 0 | 5 | 1 |
| Wolverhampton Wanderers | Total | | 35 | 6 | 1 | 0 | 1 | 1 | 0 | 0 | 37 | 7 |
| Wigan Athletic | 2001–02 | Second Division | 33 | 5 | 1 | 0 | — | | 0 | 0 | 34 | 5 |
| Wigan Athletic | 2002–03 | Second Division | 38 | 7 | 2 | 0 | 4 | 0 | 0 | 0 | 44 | 7 |
| Wigan Athletic | 2003–04 | First Division | 13 | 0 | 0 | 0 | 1 | 0 | 0 | 0 | 14 | 0 |
| Wigan Athletic | 2004–05 | Championship | 0 | 0 | 0 | 0 | 0 | 0 | 0 | 0 | 0 | 0 |
| Wigan Athletic | Total | | 84 | 12 | 3 | 0 | 5 | 0 | 0 | 0 | 92 | 12 |
| Stoke City (loan) | 2001–02 | Second Division | 5 | 0 | — | | — | | 3 (Note: Appearance(s) in the play-offs.) | 0 | 8 | 0 |
| Walsall (loan) | 2003–04 | First Division | 5 | 0 | 0 | 0 | 0 | 0 | — | | 5 | 0 |
| Blackpool (loan) | 2003–04 | Second Division | 10 | 3 | 0 | 0 | 0 | 0 | 3 (Note: Appearance(s) in the EFL Trophy.) | 0 | 13 | 3 |
| Ipswich Town (loan) | 2004–05 | Championship | 7 | 0 | 0 | 0 | 2 | 0 | 0 | 0 | 9 | 0 |
| Bristol City | 2004–05 | League One | 19 | 0 | 0 | 0 | 0 | 0 | 1 | 0 | 20 | 0 |
| Port Vale | 2004–05 | League One | 7 | 3 | — | | — | | — | | 7 | 3 |
| Port Vale | 2005–06 | League One | 35 | 2 | 4 | 0 | 1 | 0 | 1 | 0 | 41 | 2 |
| Port Vale | Total | | 42 | 5 | 4 | 0 | 1 | 0 | 1 | 0 | 48 | 5 |
| Stockport County | 2006–07 | League Two | 32 | 2 | 3 | 0 | 1 | 0 | 2 | 0 | 38 | 2 |
| Chester City | 2007–08 | League Two | 20 | 2 | 1 | 0 | — | | 1 | 0 | 22 | 2 |
| Chester City | 2008–09 | League Two | 4 | 0 | 0 | 0 | 0 | 0 | 0 | 0 | 4 | 0 |
| Chester City | Total | | 24 | 2 | 1 | 0 | 0 | 0 | 1 | 0 | 26 | 2 |
| Hednesford Town | 2009–10 | Southern League; Premier Division | 6 | 1 | 0 | 0 | — | | 0 | 0 | 6 | 1 |
| Career total (Note: Statistics for Stafford Rangers not recorded.) | | | 462 | 56 | 23 | 0 | 27 | 4 | 11 | 0 | 523 | 60 |

== Honours ==
Stockport County

- Football League Second Division second-place promotion: 1996–97

Stoke City

- Football League Second Division play-offs: 2002

Wigan Athletic

- Football League Second Division: 2002–03

Blackpool

- Football League Trophy: 2003–04

Individual

- Stockport County Player of the Season: 1999–2000
