= Aaron Wilbraham =

English footballer & manager (born 1979)

Personal information
- Full name: Aaron Thomas Wilbraham
- Date of birth: 21 October 1979 (age 47)
- Place of birth: Knutsford, England
- Height: 6 ft 3 in (1.91 m)
- Position: Forward

Youth career
- Manchester City
- 1995–1997: Stockport County

Senior career*
Years	Team	Apps	(Gls)
1997–2004	Stockport County	172	(35)
2000	→ Moss FK (loan)	6	(0)
2004–2005	Hull City	19	(2)
2004	→ Oldham Athletic (loan)	4	(2)
2005–2011	Milton Keynes Dons	176	(49)
2006	→ Bradford City (loan)	5	(1)
2011	→ Norwich City (loan)	1	(0)
2011–2012	Norwich City	22	(2)
2012–2014	Crystal Palace	25	(0)
2014–2017	Bristol City	111	(30)
2017–2018	Bolton Wanderers	23	(2)
2018–2020	Rochdale	44	(8)
2024–2025	Knutsford		
Total		608	(131)

Managerial career
- 2020–2023: Shrewsbury Town (assistant)
- 2021: Shrewsbury Town (caretaker)
- * Club domestic league appearances and goals

Aaron Thomas Wilbraham (born 21 October 1979) is an English football agent and former professional footballer who played as a forward.

== Playing career ==
=== Early career ===
Born in Knutsford, Cheshire, Wilbraham started his career at Stockport County, after time in the academy at Manchester City, scoring his first goal in a 4–1 loss to Manchester City in 1998. Altogether, he made 172 league appearances for the club. During that time he also went out on loan to Norwegian club Moss FK. He then signed for Hull City for £100,000 and played his part in winning promotion to the championship. During that time he also had a month on loan at Oldham Athletic in November 2004. In the summer of 2005 he was snapped up by MK Dons.

=== Milton Keynes Dons ===
In the 2005–06 season, he was loaned out to Bradford City for two months, scoring once against Oldham Athletic. From the 2006–07 season, Wilbraham became a first team regular for the Dons. In January 2007 he was rewarded for his performances earlier in the season with a new contract until 2009. Wilbraham helped the MK Dons to win the 2007–08 Football League Two title by scoring seven goals in their last 11 matches. He was also a member of the Dons team that won the 2007–08 Football League Trophy. He scored a hat-trick in a 5–3 victory against Cheltenham Town, whose own striker Damian Spencer also scored three goals. In the 2008–09 season under Roberto Di Matteo, he scored 17 goals. He scored his 50th and 51st goal in the 3–3 draw against Brentford on 13 March 2010.

=== Norwich City ===
On 30 December 2010, it was announced he was to join Norwich City on 1 January 2011 for an undisclosed fee on an 18-month deal. He would join the club on loan to enable him to play the match versus Queens Park Rangers before making the deal permanent later that day. He made his debut in the 1–0 victory over QPR. He opened his account against Leicester City in a 3–2 win on 8 March 2011. The same season Norwich clinched promotion to the Premier League, meaning Wilbraham had won promotion from all three divisions of the Football League.

Wilbraham made his Premier League debut at Goodison Park, coming on as a substitute for Steve Morison in a 1–1 draw against Everton. He had been an unused substitute for the majority of the season. He scored his 100th career goal as a substitute against Fulham – his first Premier League goal. This goal meant Wilbraham had scored in all four levels of English league football. He made his first Premier League start on 9 April 2012 in a 2–1 win at Tottenham Hotspur.

=== Crystal Palace ===
On 4 July 2012, Wilbraham signed a 2-year deal with Crystal Palace on a free transfer. On 28 August 2012, Wilbraham scored his first goal for Palace in a 4–1 defeat to Preston North End in the League Cup.

Wilbraham was involved in the promotion of two teams in a three-year period – automatically with Norwich in the 2010–11 season and via the playoffs with Crystal Palace. He was involved for the full 120 minutes of Palace's playoff final appearance. Wilbraham scored his second goal for Crystal Palace in a 2–1 away loss against Wigan in the FA Cup. He was released by Palace at the end of the 2013–14 season.

=== Bristol City ===
It was announced on 2 July 2014 that Wilbraham had signed for Bristol City on a one-year contract. Wilbraham scored one goal and set up another on his competitive debut for the club against Sheffield United in a 2–1 win on the opening day of the season at Bramall Lane. On his home debut, he scored twice against Colchester United in another 2–1 victory, making it three goals from his first two games. Wilbraham continued his impressive form with 2 goals in wins over Notts County and Doncaster, as well as a brace in a 3–0 win over Port Vale, taking his goal tally to 7 from 8 league games. Wilbraham eventually registered the highest goalscoring season of his career, notching 21 goals in all competitions as his side clinched promotion to the Football League Championship.

=== Bolton Wanderers ===
On 3 August 2017 Bolton Wanderers confirmed that Wilbraham had joined them for an undisclosed fee, signing a one-year contract. He scored his first goal for Bolton when coming on as a substitute for Jon Flanagan in a 1–1 draw with Sheffield Wednesday at Hillsborough on 10 March 2018. His second goal for Bolton was the winner in a 3–2 victory over Nottingham Forest on 6 May 2018 – a result which helped to keep the Trotters in the EFL Championship. He was released by Bolton at the end of the 2017–18 season.

=== Rochdale ===
On 25 June 2018, Rochdale announced the signing of Wilbraham for the 2018–19 season. He was offered a new contract by the club at the end of the 2018–19 season and on 28 June 2019, Wilbraham signed a new one-year contract.

=== Knutsford ===
In 2024 and 2025, Wilbraham came out of retirement to make ad-hoc appearances for Cheshire League First Division club Knutsford. He won the 2023–24 Cheshire FA Amateur Cup with the club.

== Coaching career ==
On 2 December 2020, Wilbraham joined Steve Cotterill's coaching staff at League One side Shrewsbury Town, joining as assistant manager.

On 19 January 2021, Wilbraham took charge as stand-in manager for an FA Cup third round tie away at Premier League side Southampton as Cotterill was suffering from COVID-19. Shrewsbury lost the tie 2–0. Wilbraham also took charge on 23 January, a 1–0 league defeat away at Sunderland.

== Personal life ==
Wilbraham's brother Joe is an amateur footballer. He is a football agent.

== Career statistics ==
As of match played 22 February 2020

Appearances and goals by club, season and competition
Club	Season	League			National cup (Note: Includes FA Cup, Norwegian Cup)		League cup (Note: Includes EFL Cup)		Other		Total	
Club	Season	Division	Apps	Goals	Apps	Goals	Apps	Goals	Apps	Goals	Apps	Goals
Stockport County	1997–98	First Division	7	1	0	0	0	0	―		7	1
Stockport County	1998–99	First Division	26	0	0	0	1	0	―		27	0
Stockport County	1999–2000	First Division	26	4	0	0	4	1	―		30	5
Stockport County	2000–01	First Division	36	12	3	0	0	0	―		39	12
Stockport County	2001–02	First Division	21	3	0	0	1	0	―		22	3
Stockport County	2002–03	Second Division	15	7	0	0	0	0	0	0	15	7
Stockport County	2003–04	Second Division	41	8	1	0	1	0	2 (Note: Appearances in EFL Trophy)	0	45	8
Stockport County	Total		172	35	4	0	7	1	2	0	185	36
Moss FK (loan)	2000	Tippeligaen	6	0	0	0	―		―		6	0
Hull City	2004–05	League One	19	2	1	0	0	0	―		20	2
Oldham Athletic (loan)	2004–05	League One	4	2	0	0	―		1	0	5	2
Milton Keynes Dons	2005–06	League One	31	4	2	0	1	0	3	2	38	6
Milton Keynes Dons	2006–07	League Two	32	7	2	0	2	2	0	0	36	9
Milton Keynes Dons	2007–08	League Two	35	10	1	0	2	0	2	0	40	10
Milton Keynes Dons	2008–09	League One	33	16	0	0	1	0	2 (Note: Appearances in League One play-offs)	1	36	17
Milton Keynes Dons	2009–10	League One	35	10	3	0	0	0	5	2	43	12
Milton Keynes Dons	2010–11	League One	10	2	0	0	1	1	1	0	12	3
Milton Keynes Dons	Total		176	49	8	0	7	3	14	5	205	57
Bradford City (loan)	2005–06	League One	5	1	―		―		―		5	1
Norwich City	2010–11	Championship	12	1	1	0	―		―		13	1
Norwich City	2011–12	Premier League	11	1	3	0	1	0	―		15	1
Norwich City	Total		23	2	4	0	1	0	―		28	2
Crystal Palace	2012–13	Championship	21	0	1	0	1	1	3 (Note: Appearances in Championship play-offs)	0	26	1
Crystal Palace	2013–14	Premier League	4	0	1	1	1	0	―		6	1
Crystal Palace	Total		25	0	2	1	2	1	3	0	32	2
Bristol City	2014–15	League One	37	18	2	0	1	0	4	3	44	21
Bristol City	2015–16	Championship	43	8	2	0	1	0	―		46	8
Bristol City	2016–17	Championship	31	4	0	0	4	1	―		35	5
Bristol City	Total		111	30	4	0	6	1	4	3	125	34
Bolton Wanderers	2017–18	Championship	23	2	1	0	3	0	―		27	2
Rochdale	2018–19	League One	21	4	0	0	1	0	1	0	23	4
Rochdale	2019–20	League One	23	4	0	0	1	0	1	0	25	4
Rochdale	Total		44	!8	0	0	2	0	2	0	48	8
Career total			704	129	24	1	29	6	25	8	782	144

== Honours ==
Hull City

- Football League One second-place promotion: 2004–05

Milton Keynes Dons

- Football League Two: 2007–08
- Football League Trophy: 2007–08

Norwich City

- Football League Championship second-place promotion: 2010–11

Crystal Palace

- Football League Championship play-offs: 2013

Bristol City

- Football League One: 2014–15
- Football League Trophy: 2014–15

Kmutsford

- Cheshire FA Amateur Cup: 2023–24

Individual

- Milton Keynes Dons Player of the Year: 2008–09
