= Ian Johnson (footballer, born 1983) =

English footballer

Personal information
- Date of birth: 7 March 1983 (age 43)
- Place of birth: Liverpool, England
- Position: Midfielder

Senior career*
Years	Team	Apps	(Gls)
2001–2002	Wigan Athletic	0	(0)
2002–2003	Southport	0	(0)
2003–2004	Marine	7	(1)
2004–2006	Burscough	21	(6)
2006–?	Clitheroe		
2008–2009	A.F.C. Liverpool	14	(2)

Managerial career
- 2016–2018: Clitheroe (Assistant Manager)
- 2018: Marine (Assistant Manager)
- 2018: Marine (Caretaker Manager)
- 2018–2020: Marine (First Team Coach)
- 2020–2021: Stalybridge Celtic (Assistant Manager)
- 2021–: Marine (Head of Scouting)
- * Club domestic league appearances and goals

Ian Johnson (born 7 March 1983 in Liverpool) is an English football midfielder. He is the grandson of former Liverpool player Ronnie Moran.

== Playing career ==
Johnson started his career at Wigan Athletic. He made his debut for the club on 9 January 2001 in a 3–2 away win against Oldham Athletic in the Football League Trophy, and made a further appearance in the next round of the competition in a 2–1 defeat against Walsall. He signed a one-year professional contract with the club at the end of the season, but failed to make a first-team appearance during the following season and was released in April 2002. He then joined Southport, where he made one appearance in the Liverpool Senior Cup, scoring in a 3–1 win against Prescot Cables. He was released, however, in March 2003 without making a single league appearance for the club. He then signed for Marine, playing seven times and scoring once, before joining Burscough in March 2004.

After a good first season with the club, in which he scored six goals, Johnson suffered a cruciate ligament injury, keeping him out for most of the following season.

He played a number of games for Clitheroe.

In 2008, he signed for newly formed A.F.C. Liverpool, where he played 14 times and scored twice during the 2008–09 season.

== Coaching and management career ==
Johnson was assistant manager at Clitheroe to Simon Haworth between 2016 and April 2018 and returned to Marine Football Club in May 2018, when he was named as manager Tommy Lawson's new assistant. He was made caretaker manager of the club in September 2018 after Lawson's resignation. Later that month Neil Young was appointed manager and he became first team coach. Johnson moved on to Stalybridge Celtic as Assistant Manager in June 2020, leaving the club in September 2021. He returned to Marine in December 2021 as Head of Scouting.
