= Luke Beckett =

English footballer (born 1976)

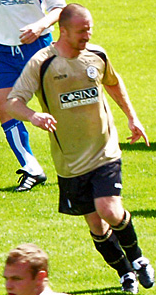

Personal information
- Full name: Luke John Beckett
- Date of birth: 25 November 1976 (age 49)
- Place of birth: Sheffield, England
- Height: 5 ft 11 in (1.80 m)
- Position: Striker

Youth career
- 1991–1998: Barnsley

Senior career*
| Years | Team | Apps | (Gls) |
| 1998–2000 | Chester City | 74 | (25) |
| 2000–2002 | Chesterfield | 62 | (22) |
| 2002–2004 | Stockport County | 84 | (45) |
| 2004–2006 | Sheffield United | 5 | (0) |
| 2005 | → Huddersfield Town (loan) | 7 | (6) |
| 2005 | → Oldham Athletic (loan) | 9 | (6) |
| 2005–2006 | → Oldham Athletic (loan) | 34 | (18) |
| 2006–2008 | Huddersfield Town | 78 | (23) |
| 2008–2011 | Gainsborough Trinity | 97 | (38) |
| 2011 | → Worksop Town (loan) | 9 | (3) |
| 2012 | Goole | | |
- * Club domestic league appearances and goals

Luke John Beckett (born 25 November 1976) is an English former professional footballer who played as a striker from 1998 to 2012.

Born in Sheffield, England, Beckett played in the Football League for ten years notably appearing for Sheffield United, Huddersfield Town, Stockport County and Oldham Athletic, having also played for Chester City, Chesterfield, Gainsborough Trinity, Worksop Town and Goole.

== Career ==
Beckett made his name as a prolific striker since making his Football League début for Chester City in a 2–0 defeat by Leyton Orient in August 1998. He had been signed on a free transfer from Barnsley and was to be a big hit in his two years with Chester, winning the club's player of the season award in 1999–2000. This season saw Chester relegated from the Football League and Beckett moved to Chesterfield.

Despite the Spireites suffering a points deduction for off-field matters, Beckett helped them win promotion from Division Three in 2000–01 and he would go on to be similarly prolific for Stockport County scoring nearly 50 goals in 2 years. This prompted a move to Sheffield United in November 2004 for £50,000.

However, he never scored for the Blades and spent most of his two seasons as a United player out on loan at Oldham Athletic. £20,000 of his loan fee to Oldham was subsidised by Trust Oldham. He was also on loan at Huddersfield Town where his six goals in seven appearances in 2005 persuaded Terriers manager Peter Jackson to sign Beckett on 3 July 2006, for £85,000, on a three-year deal.

On 5 January 2008, Beckett scored the opening goal in a 2–1 victory over Premier League side Birmingham City in the FA Cup third round. He scored in the following round as Huddersfield defeated Oldham Athletic 1–0. He was believed to be close to signing for League Two side Bradford City in May, and was later ready to sign for York City in the Conference National, but could not reach an agreement over the remainder of his contract with Huddersfield.

On 27 November, he joined Conference North side Gainsborough Trinity on a short-term contract after paying off the remainder of his contract with Huddersfield. Beckett made his Trinity debut two days later; after setting up the first two goals, he scored the third goal in the club's 3–0 win over Harrogate Town. In January, he extended his stay with Gainsborough until the end of the 2008–09 season.

On 11 March 2011 Beckett joined Worksop Town on loan for the remainder of the 2010–11 season. Upon the completion of the 2010–11 season Beckett was released by Trinity.

In March 2012 he joined Goole, where he saw out the remainder of the 2012–13 season.
