= Peter Clark (footballer, born 1979) =

English footballer and scout

Personal information
- Full name: Peter James Clark
- Date of birth: 10 December 1979 (age 46)
- Place of birth: Romford, England
- Height: 1.85 m (6 ft 1 in)
- Position: Defender

Team information
- Current team: Newcastle United (scout)

Youth career
- 1996–1998: Arsenal

Senior career*
Years	Team	Apps	(Gls)
1998–2000	Carlisle United	79	(1)
2000–2003	Stockport County	72	(3)
2002	→ Mansfield Town (loan)	4	(0)
2003–2004	Northampton Town	6	(0)
Total		161	(4)
- * Club domestic league appearances and goals

Peter James Clark (born 10 December 1979) is an English former professional footballer and football scout who works for Premier League club Newcastle United.

As a player, he was a defender and made 161 appearances in the English Football League for Carlisle United, Stockport County, Mansfield Town and Northampton Town.

After retiring as a player, Clark moved into recruitment and spent more than 16 years with Arsenal, eventually becoming the club's head of UK scouting. He left Arsenal in 2020 and joined Newcastle United's recruitment operation in 2023.

== Playing career ==
=== Arsenal and Carlisle United ===
Born in Romford, Clark began his career as a trainee with Arsenal. He did not make a league appearance for Arsenal before leaving the club in 1998.

Clark joined Carlisle United on 6 August 1998. He became a regular in the first team, making 79 league appearances and scoring once during his two seasons at Brunton Park.

Clark was part of the Carlisle side involved in one of the most notable finishes to a Football League season. On 8 May 1999, he played against Plymouth Argyle in Carlisle's final match of the 1998–99 season. With Carlisle needing a victory to avoid relegation from the Football League, goalkeeper Jimmy Glass scored from a corner deep into stoppage time to secure a 2–1 win and preserve the club's league status.

=== Stockport County and Mansfield Town ===
In July 2000, Clark joined Stockport County. He made 72 league appearances and scored three goals during three seasons with the club.

During the 2002–03 season, Clark spent a month on loan at Mansfield Town, joining the club in September 2002. He made four league appearances during the loan spell.

=== Northampton Town ===
Clark left Stockport in June 2003 and joined Northampton Town for an undisclosed fee. He made six league appearances during the 2003–04 season.

His time at Northampton was affected by injury, and he subsequently retired from professional football.

== Scouting career ==
=== Arsenal ===
Following the end of his playing career, Clark returned to Arsenal and moved into scouting. He later became the club's head of UK scouting.

In August 2020, Clark left Arsenal as part of a restructuring of the club's recruitment operation. Head of international scouting Francis Cagigao and scout Brian McDermott were among the other senior scouting staff to leave the club.

Arsenal technical director Edu subsequently said that the changes were intended to create a smaller recruitment department working more closely together and making greater use of the club's data and analytics resources.

=== Newcastle United ===
In 2023, Clark joined Newcastle United as part of the club's recruitment operation. He works as a scout for the club.
