= David Smith (footballer, born 1970) =

English footballer

Personal information
- Date of birth: 26 December 1970 (age 55)
- Place of birth: Liverpool, England
- Position: Midfielder

Senior career*
Years	Team	Apps	(Gls)
1989–1994	Norwich City	18	(0)
1994–1999	Oxford United	193	(3)
1999–2002	Stockport County	70	(3)
2001–2002	→ Macclesfield Town (loan)	8	(0)
2002–2003	Drogheda United	?	(?)
2003–2004	Macclesfield Town	13	(0)
- * Club domestic league appearances and goals

David Smith (born 26 December 1970) is a former professional footballer. He was a midfielder who played for Norwich City (where he began his career), Oxford United, Stockport County, Macclesfield Town, and Drogheda United.

He came through the youth team and reserves at Norwich and played 18 times for the first team. His league debut was in April 1990 against Derby County. He played 198 times for Oxford (2 goals), and 60 games for Stockport.
