= Ian Lawson (footballer, born 1977) =

English footballer

Personal information
- Full name: Ian James Lawson
- Date of birth: 4 November 1977 (age 48)
- Place of birth: Huddersfield, England
- Height: 5 ft 11 in (1.80 m)
- Position: Forward

Youth career
- Huddersfield Town

Senior career*
Years	Team	Apps	(Gls)
1993–1999	Huddersfield Town	42	(5)
1998	→ Blackpool (loan)	5	(3)
1999	→ Blackpool (loan)	4	(0)
1999–2000	Bury	25	(11)
2000–2001	Stockport County	25	(4)
2001–2003	Bury	30	(7)
Total		131	(30)
- * Club domestic league appearances and goals

Ian James Lawson (born 4 November 1977) is an English former professional footballer who played 131 games in the Football League as a forward for Huddersfield Town, Blackpool, Bury and Stockport County.

His father Jimmy was also a professional footballer.
