= Ian Thomas-Moore =

English footballer (born 1976)

Personal information
- Full name: Ian Ronald Thomas-Moore
- Birth name: Ian Ronald Moore
- Date of birth: 26 August 1976 (age 50)
- Place of birth: Birkenhead, England
- Height: 5 ft 11 in (1.80 m)
- Positions: Striker; winger

Senior career*
Years	Team	Apps	(Gls)
1994–1997	Tranmere Rovers	58	(12)
1996	→ Bradford City (loan)	6	(0)
1997–1998	Nottingham Forest	15	(1)
1997	→ West Ham United (loan)	1	(0)
1998–2000	Stockport County	93	(20)
2000–2005	Burnley	192	(37)
2005–2007	Leeds United	59	(2)
2007–2008	Hartlepool United	24	(6)
2008–2011	Tranmere Rovers	120	(33)
2011	Rotherham United	12	(3)
Total		580	(114)

International career
1995	England U18	3	(0)
1996–1997	England U21	6	(0)
- * Club domestic league appearances and goals

Ian Ronald Thomas-Moore (born Ian Ronald Moore; 26 August 1976) is an English former professional footballer who played as a centre-forward or winger.

== Club career ==
=== Tranmere Rovers ===
Moore began his career at Tranmere Rovers, where he broke into the first team while still a teenager, and made more than 50 appearances. He also spent a short period on loan at Bradford City to gain more first team experience. His impact on a Tranmere side that at the time was a regular contender for promotion to the Premier League, where his records for goals and assists and all-round contribution to play were impressive, along with his inclusion in England youth sides at all levels up to under-21s, led many to believe he was destined to play at an even higher level.

=== Nottingham Forest ===
He made his first big-money move in March 1997 in a £1million move to Nottingham Forest under Dave Bassett but failed to make a significant impact – getting just one goal against Stoke City in 15 games and so was loaned out again, this time to West Ham United in the Premier League. Moore was given little chance at the Boleyn Ground and made just one substitute appearance in a 3–0 defeat to Southampton.

=== Stockport County ===
Stockport County was the next team to take a gamble on the goal-shy striker who signed him for a then club record fee of £800,000. To some extent the gamble paid off and Moore gave a goal return of almost one goal in every four games – netting 20 times and becoming the club's leading scorer.

=== Burnley ===
This rapid improvement in form brought the attention of north west neighbours Burnley and Thomas-Moore moved to Turf Moor for a £1million record transfer fee in the winter of 2000.

Moore became known at Turf Moor for his pace and dedication, and regularly chased down goalkeepers and defenders to try and force mistakes. Moore went on to make almost 200 appearances for 'The Clarets', scoring 37 league goals in the process. He seemed to enjoy the FA Cup most though – netting a hat-trick against Canvey Island and a double against AFC Bournemouth. Some of his fans said he was like a "dog with a balloon".

As his career progressed at Turf Moor, Moore was increasingly played as a winger, which was thought of as his best position considering his lack of goal scoring prowess but taking advantage of his pace. This was not a position which Moore enjoyed however, and he often visibly 'sulked' in games, and his previous dogged determination had gone. Whilst at Burnley he also suffered a series of injuries which, while not career ending, were severe enough for the previously quick striker to lose much of his pace.

=== Leeds United ===
In the last year of his contract, Leeds United decided to sign the striker, where he re-joined the ex-Burnley assistant manager, Sam Ellis. Moore was sold by Steve Cotterill for a fee of £50,000, an amount many Burnley fans were surprised at due to the player's poor career with the Clarets. Moore hardly featured under manager Kevin Blackwell with many Leeds fans seeing Moore as a waste of time and space. However, on 19 September 2006 in the League Cup game against Barnet, Moore scored his first goals for Leeds United, netting twice to lead the team to a 3–1 victory. He then scored in the next round in a 3–1 defeat to Southend United.

Under new manager, Dennis Wise, Moore played regularly and looked a completely new player. He scored his first league goal for Leeds United against Southend United at Elland Road in Wise's first game in charge (just 4 days after scoring against them in the League Cup). He later scored against Stoke City too, his second and final league goal for the club. However, he was released at the end of the season following his club's relegation to League One.

=== Hartlepool United ===
Moore signed for Hartlepool United on 12 July 2007, on a free transfer. But after nine goals from 30 appearances in all competitions he was transfer listed by the club in January 2008.

=== Back to Tranmere ===
On 31 January 2008 Moore joined his father Ronnie when he signed for Tranmere Rovers for an undisclosed fee. He scored on his debut against his former club Leeds United in a 2–0 Tranmere victory. He also netted against Millwall and Port Vale as he ended the season playing up front with Chris Greenacre. Moore continued his good form against old club Leeds by scoring in a 2–1 home victory in the 2008/09 season

He ended up having an impressive season for Rovers, he scored 11 times as Rovers finished 7th and were two minutes away from clinching a play-off place. Thomas-Moore scored a quality double against Carlisle in Rovers' 4–1 win. He also added goals against the likes of Stockport, Southend and Oldham as well as gaining a goal of the season candidate with a volley against Scunthorpe in the Football League Trophy.

Moore had another impressive season at Tranmere in 2009/10 season, having netted 15 goals, including two penalties against League One leaders Norwich City in a surprise 3–1 victory at Prenton Park. Ian Thomas Moore scored his 100th football league goal against Norwich. Moore also netted against Southampton, Gillingham, Wycombe and Aldershot. One of his most important goals in the same season was a valuable equaliser as Tranmere earned a point away at Colchester in their bid to avoid relegation.

Again Moore proved why he was awarded Player of the Season at Tranmere, creating and scoring a vital penalty to put Tranmere 1–0 up in their vital clash against Millwall at Prenton Park, which resulted in Tranmere running out 2–0 winners. Moore also assisted in the second goal.

Moore's impressive season went all the way to the last game of the season away at Stockport County, where he scored the second goal in possibly the biggest game of his career.

In August 2010, manager Les Parry revealed that Moore had submitted a transfer request after being approached by another club, rumoured to be Rotherham United where his father Ronnie Moore was, at the time, manager.

=== Rotherham United ===
On 26 January 2011 Moore signed for Rotherham United for an undisclosed fee. He made his debut in a 4–0 win over his old club Stockport County and set up strike partner Adam Le Fondre for the fourth goal of the game. On Twitter on 21 June 2011 Ian announced he had left Rotherham by mutual consent, three months after his father had also "left by mutual consent". He has since trained with League 2 club Accrington Stanley with a view to sign, but nothing materialised and on 18 August it was announced he had turned Stanley down on an offer of a non-contract basis. After his release from Rotherham he hinted he may hang his boots up and retire. He said "If nothing happens by the first week of August, I might have to call it a day."

In August 2011 Moore began training daily with Stockport County from the Conference Premier.

On Tuesday 6 September 2011, Thomas-Moore posted on the social networking site Twitter that he was retiring from professional football. Moore posted: "After a long hard think over weekend, I have decided to pull the curtain down on my career, was hard but the right time, thanks for support".

=== Further involvement with Tranmere ===
On the evening of 3 March 2012, following the dismissal of Les Parry as Tranmere Rovers manager, Moore suggested that his father, Ronnie, contact Peter Johnson, the Tranmere chairman. Ronnie did so, and was installed as manager, the following day, until the end of the 2011–2012 season. He was also in line to sign for the 2012–2013 season to come out of retirement but after a few training sessions with Tranmere he again informed he was going back into retirement.
