= Sean Connelly =

English footballer

Personal information
- Full name: Sean Patrick Connelly
- Date of birth: 26 June 1970 (age 56)
- Place of birth: Sheffield, England
- Height: 5 ft 10 in (1.78 m)
- Position: Defender

Senior career*
Years	Team	Apps	(Gls)
1991–1992	Hallam		
1992–2001	Stockport County	302	(6)
2001	→ Wolverhampton Wanderers (loan)	6	(0)
2001–2002	Wolverhampton Wanderers	8	(0)
2002–2004	Tranmere Rovers	70	(0)
2004–2005	Rushden & Diamonds	42	(0)
Total		428	(6)
- * Club domestic league appearances and goals

Sean Patrick Connelly (born 26 June 1970) is an English former professional footballer, currently working as the lead physio at the Football Association of Wales.

== Career ==
Connelly began his football career at his local side, Hallam, before Stockport County manager Danny Bergara offered him a professional contract at the club, one that he accepted on finishing his degree in physiotherapy. He helped Stockport to the semi-finals of the 1996-97 League Cup, beating Premier League teams Blackburn Rovers, West Ham United and Southampton en route. In the semi-finals they faced another Premier League team in Middlesbrough. Boro won the first leg 2–0 at Edgeley Park. In the second leg at the Riverside, Connelly gave Stockport an early lead. They were, however, unable to score again and lost 2–1 on aggregate. His impressive form even generated rumours of a possible move to Liverpool, although this failed to materialise.

The defender played under four different managers during his nine-year stay at Stockport – Bergara, Dave Jones, Gary Megson and Andy Kilner. He also qualified as a Chartered Physiotherapist during his time there, in 1993. He eventually left in 2001, after former manager Jones persuaded him to join him at Wolves. In 2002, he was inducted into the Stockport County hall of fame.

He signed permanently for Wolves after an initial loan spell in Spring 2001. However, he struggled to hold down a regular first team place during the following season at Molineux and was allowed to join Tranmere Rovers in October 2002.

He quickly established himself at Tranmere and was a regular for two years before manager Brian Little decided against offering him a new contract, whereupon he moved to Rushden & Diamonds, where he finished his playing career.

After leaving Rushden & Diamonds he linked up with Dave Jones again, this time as physio at Cardiff City, turning down offers to continue playing in order to take the job. In 2014 he left Cardiff City to become Head of Performance at Servette FC, Geneva, Switzerland. This was short lived and he quickly returned to the English Premiership as Lead Physiotherapist for Crystal Palace. In 2017 he left Palace to take up a full time role with the Football Association of Wales.
