= Karim Fradin =

French footballer (born 1972)

Personal information
- Date of birth: 2 February 1972 (age 54)
- Place of birth: Saint-Martin-d'Hères, France
- Height: 1.80 m (5 ft 11 in)
- Position: Midfielder

Senior career*
Years	Team	Apps	(Gls)
1989–1990	Valenciennes B	28	(0)
1990–1991	Niort B	9	(0)
1991–1998	Niort	237	(4)
1998–1999	Nice	7	(0)
1999–2003	Stockport County	82	(9)
2003–2005	Châteauroux	43	(0)
2005–2007	Niort	54	(0)
Total		460	(13)
- * Club domestic league appearances and goals

Karim Fradin (born 2 February 1972) is a French football executive and former player who played as a midfielder. As of 2021, he is the president of Ligue 2 club Niort.

== After football ==
After he retired from playing football, Fradin began a career in sports management, becoming the president of former club Niort in 2009.
