= Kevin Cooper (footballer) =

English footballer and manager (born 1975)

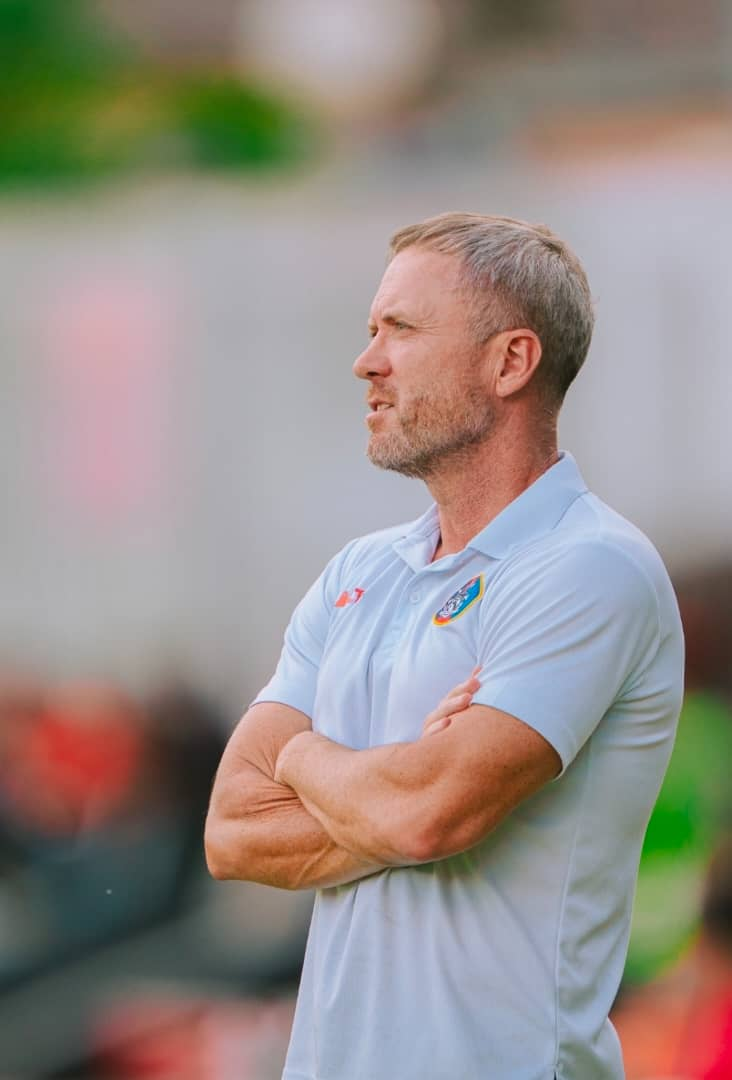
- Kevin coaching at Armed Forces in Malaysia

Personal information
- Full name: Kevin Lee Cooper
- Date of birth: 8 February 1975 (age 51)
- Place of birth: Derby, England
- Position: Midfielder

Youth career
- 1993–1995: Derby County

Senior career*
| Years | Team | Apps | (Gls) |
| 1995–1997 | Derby County | 2 | (0) |
| 1997 | → Stockport County (loan) | 12 | (3) |
| 1997–2001 | Stockport County | 155 | (18) |
| 2001–2002 | Wimbledon | 51 | (13) |
| 2002–2005 | Wolverhampton Wanderers | 62 | (9) |
| 2004 | → Sunderland (loan) | 1 | (0) |
| 2004 | → Norwich City (loan) | 10 | (0) |
| 2005–2008 | Cardiff City | 40 | (2) |
| 2006 | → Yeovil Town (loan) | 4 | (0) |
| 2007 | → Walsall (loan) | 7 | (0) |
| 2007 | → Tranmere Rovers (loan) | 4 | (0) |
| 2008 | Chesterfield | 7 | (1) |
| 2008–2009 | Newport County | 33 | (2) |
| 2010–2011 | Neath | 33 | (2) |
| Total | | 404 | (50) |

Managerial career
- 2012–2014: Cardiff City F.C.
- 2014–2015: Servette
- 2015–2016: Wil
- 2017-2018: Hartlepool
- 2019–Present: Armed Forces
- * Club domestic league appearances and goals as of 18:28, 11 December 2010 (UTC)

Kevin Lee Cooper (born 8 February 1975) is an English football manager and former professional footballer. He is the current technical director and head coach of Malaysia A1 Semi-Pro League club Armed Forces.

== Managerial statistics ==
As of 30 June 2016

Managerial Record by Team and Tenure
| Team | Nat. | From | To | Record | | | | | Ref. |
| Team | Nat. | From | To | G | W | D | L | Win % | Ref. |
|---|---|---|---|---|---|---|---|---|---|
| Servette | (Switzerland) | 1 July 2014 | 4 November 2015 | 53 | 29 | 10 | 14 | 54.72 | |
| FC Wil | (Switzerland) | 4 November 2015 | 30 June 2016 | 21 | 9 | 6 | 6 | 42.86 | |
| Career Total | | | | 74 | 38 | 16 | 20 | 51.35 | |

== Playing career ==
Cooper began his career as a trainee at his hometown club Derby County but managed only five first team appearances for the club in total. His league debut came on 7 May 1995, as a substitute in a 2–1 defeat at Watford. In the spring of 1997, he found an opportunity for first team football when he was taken on loan at First Division Stockport County.

The midfielder joined the Edgeley Park club permanently that summer for £150,000 and went on to make 173 appearances in total over almost four seasons. He eventually moved to Wimbledon in March 2001 for £800,000. He stayed a year with the Dons, notching his best seasonal goal tally of 10 during the 2001–02 season. (Cooper is not to be confused with striker Kevin Cooper, who scored 90 goals for AFC Wimbledon from 2002 to 2004 and was their highest scorer over two seasons). However, he ended the season by being signed by his former Stockport manager Dave Jones, now at Wolverhampton Wanderers, for £1 million in March 2002. His commitment and skill playing for Wimbledon FC won him the fans' player of the year award, which he was presented with on the pitch at Molineux playing for his new team.

He joined Wolves primarily to replace the then-injured Mark Kennedy, and played the remainder of the 2001–02 season as Wolves, who had been challenging for automatic promotion for most of the season, finished in the play-offs. Wolves eventually lost to Norwich City, despite Cooper scoring a spectacular long range goal in the second leg. He then featured regularly, although not as a first choice player, throughout the following season as the team won promotion to the Premier League.

Cooper did not get to enjoy the top flight though. His one substitute appearance against Charlton Athletic was the only Premier League appearance of his career. He spent the later half of the season on loan at second-tier clubs Sunderland and Norwich City, where he won a championship medal as the Canaries won the division.

He returned to Wolves, post-relegation, and found himself back in the side during the 2004–05 season. However, he requested a transfer for more playing time, and was signed again by Dave Jones, newly appointed at fellow Championship club Cardiff City, in July 2005. He was a regular player in his first season at Ninian Park but fell out of favour in the following years and was loaned out to Yeovil Town and Walsall during the 2006–07 season and was subsequently placed on the transfer list at the end of the season.

He stayed at Cardiff through the summer but again found himself only in the reserve squad at the start of the year, so he joined League One side Tranmere Rovers on a one-month loan in October 2007. After returning to his parent club, he was given a send-off game against Welshpool Town in the FAW Premier Cup, his first game in over a year for the Bluebirds.

His contract at Cardiff was terminated by mutual consent on 1 February 2008, so that Cooper would have a better chance of finding a new side. One week later, he joined Chesterfield until the end of the season. where he made a goalscoring debut against Grimsby, However, his contract was not extended at the end of the season and he was released.

He signed with Conference South team Newport County on 15 July 2008. He was released in October 2009.

Cooper then played for Neath in the Welsh Premier League, playing 33 league games for the club, and also appeared for the University of Glamorgan football team. He scored a candidate for goal of the season in late 2010 as he chipped Newtown goalkeeper Dave Roberts from the halfway line at Latham Park.

== Managerial career ==
After leaving Neath, Cooper relocated to Malaysia to manage Cardiff's 1MCC – One Malaysia Cardiff City – which is linked to the Far Eastern ownership of Cardiff City.

Ahead of the start of the 2012–13 season, Cooper returned to Cardiff City as the head coach of the club's under-21 side.

In 2014 Kevin Cooper was appointed as the manager of Swiss second-tier side Servette Geneva. Although he guided the team to second place in the Swiss Challenge League, the team was relegated to the third tier of Swiss football for 2015-16 for financial reasons.

On 4 November 2015, fellow Challenge League side FC Wil announced that they signed Cooper on a contract that would keep him at the club until 2017.

On 18 January 2017, joined Hartlepool United. On 24 April 2017, left Hartlepool United.

In 2019, returned to Malaysia and was appointed as technical director and Head Coach at Armed Forces, now playing in the second tier of Malaysian Football.

== Personal life ==
Kevin Cooper is the father of the Welsh footballer Oli Cooper.

== Honours ==
Norwich City

- Football League First Division: 2003–04
