= Keith Briggs (footballer) =

English footballer and coach

Personal information
- Date of birth: 11 December 1981 (age 44)
- Place of birth: Glossop, England
- Positions: Right midfielder; central midfielder

Youth career
- 1995–1999: Stockport County

Senior career*
Years	Team	Apps	(Gls)
1999–2003	Stockport County	58	(2)
2003–2005	Norwich City	5	(0)
2004	→ Crewe Alexandra (loan)	3	(0)
2005–2008	Stockport County	90	(8)
2008	Shrewsbury Town	2	(1)
2008	→ Mansfield Town	13	(0)
2008–2010	Stalybridge Celtic	38	(0)
2010–2011	Kidderminster Harriers	43	(6)
2011–2012	Fleetwood Town	16	(1)
2012–2013	Kidderminster Harriers	33	(1)
2013	Halifax Town	2	(0)
2013	Barrow	2	(0)
2013–2015	Stalybridge Celtic	11	(0)

Managerial career
- 2013–2015: Stalybridge Celtic (player-manager)
- 2015: New Mills
- 2015–2016: Sheffield United (academy)
- 2016–2017: Southport (assistant manager)
- * Club domestic league appearances and goals

Keith Briggs (born 11 December 1981) is an English football coach and former professional player.

== Career ==
Born in Glossop, Derbyshire, Briggs began his career as a trainee Stockport County in August 1999 and made his debut in a League Cup 1st round tie against Oldham in the same month. He made 68 league and cup appearances for Stockport before joining Norwich City in January 2003 for £65,000, where he was unable to establish a regular place in the first team and spent a loan spell at Crewe Alexandra. He made three league appearances during Norwich's 2003–04 season after which they were promoted to the Premier League as First Division champions. Briggs was released by Norwich in September 2004 and returned to Stockport in January 2005. After making a further 98 appearances for Stockport County, his contract was not renewed and he joined Shrewsbury Town on non-contract terms in January 2008. He scored on his debut against Hereford United but was released by manager Gary Peters after playing just two games and joined Mansfield Town on loan in February 2008. He left Mansfield at the end of the 2007–08 season, and played for Stalybridge Celtic during the 2008–09 season. In 2011, he signed a two-year deal with Fleetwood Town for a fee believed to be in the region of £8,000. Upon his release he re-signed with Kidderminster Harriers in 2012. At the end of the 2012–13 season, Briggs signed a contract with Halifax Town. He went out on loan to Barrow before being appointed manager of Stalybridge Celtic on 18 October 2013. On 15 March, Briggs resigned as the manager of Stalybridge Celtic. He later managed New Mills A.F.C. in the Northern Premier League Division One North. After spells in various roles coaching at Derby County's academy, Briggs took up the role of under-21 player development coach, working alongside under-21 lead coach Jake Buxton. In June 2025, Briggs became lead coach Derby County's B team.
