= Robert Clare =

English footballer (born 1983)

Rob Clare
Personal information
- Full name: Robert David Clare
- Date of birth: 28 February 1983 (age 43)
- Place of birth: Belper, England
- Position: Defender

Team information
- Current team: Stockport County (commercial manager)

Youth career
- Derby County
- Stockport County

Senior career*
Years	Team	Apps	(Gls)
2000–2004	Stockport County	117	(3)
2004–2005	Blackpool	23	(0)
2005–2008	Stockport County	64	(2)
Total		204	(5)

International career
2002−2003	England U20	2	(0)
- * Club domestic league appearances and goals

Robert Clare (born 28 February 1983) is an English former professional footballer who played as a defender.

== Playing career ==
Clare was born in Belper, Derbyshire. He began his career at Stockport County, where he had progressed through the Centre of Excellence youth system, making his debut as a substitute in a 4–1 defeat at Fulham. He spent one season at Blackpool, before re-joining Stockport.

In August 2004, Clare received a call-up to the England Under-21 squad for their friendly against Ukraine. He was an unused substitute. He played twice for the England under 20 team.

During the 2006–07 season, Clare was part of the Stockport County side that set a record for winning nine games in a row without conceding. He was notable for playing every minute of that nine-game run.

== Post-playing career ==
In June 2008, Clare was released from his contract with Stockport County after an injury-plagued year. Injury forced Clare to retire prematurely at the age of 25. He pursued referee and coaching qualifications. He is married and has four children.
