= Neil Ross (footballer) =

English footballer

Personal information
- Date of birth: 10 August 1982 (age 44)
- Place of birth: West Bromwich, England
- Position: Striker

Team information
- Current team: Bruno's Magpies (first team coach)

Youth career
- 1999–2000: Leeds United

Senior career*
Years	Team	Apps	(Gls)
2000–2003	Stockport County	9	(2)
2001	→ Radcliffe Borough (loan)	2	(0)
2001	→ Bristol Rovers (loan)	5	(0)
2003–2004	Macclesfield Town	14	(0)
2003	→ Northwich Victoria (loan)	3	(1)
2004	→ Tamworth (loan)	7	(2)
2004–2005	Halifax Town	12	(4)
2005–2006	Alfreton Town	?	(?)
2006	Bradford Park Avenue	?	(?)
2006–2007	Ossett Town	?	(?)
2007	Ilkeston Town	?	(?)
2007–2008	Buxton	?	(?)
2008–2009	FC Halifax Town	?	(?)
2009–2011	Harrogate Railway Athletic	?	(?)

Managerial career
- 2013–2014: Leeds United Women
- 2021–2022: Farsley Celtic
- 2022–: Bruno's Magpies U23
- * Club domestic league appearances and goals

Neil Ross (born 10 August 1982) is an English football coach and former professional footballer who was most recently manager of Farsley Celtic. He currently serves as assistant coach at Bruno's Magpies, where he is also in charge of their U23 team.

== Career ==
Born in West Bromwich, Ross began his career as a trainee at Leeds United in 1999 but made no appearances for the club and joined Stockport County on a free transfer in April 2000. He made nine league appearances, scoring two goals, and had loan spells at Radcliffe Borough and Bristol Rovers, in two and a half seasons at Stockport. He joined Macclesfield Town in January 2003, after initially failing to agree personal terms, and was allowed to go to Conference National side Northwich Victoria on a one-month loan in September 2003 to get match practice. He made 14 appearances for Macclesfield Town without scoring, but did not form part of manager Brian Horton's plans for the 2004–05 season and was placed on the transfer list in August 2004. He joined Tamworth on a one-month loan in the same month, where he scored twice in seven games.

Ross joined Conference National club Halifax Town in November 2004 until the end of the 2004–05 season. He later played for Alfreton Town, Bradford Park Avenue, Ossett Town, Ilkeston Town, and Buxton before returning to Halifax Town, now playing in the Northern Premier League Division One North, in July 2008.

In November 2021 he was appointed first team manager at Farsley Celtic, having been the club's under-19 and under-23 manager since 2018. However, he left the club in January 2022. He subsequently moved to Gibraltar to assist newly appointed Nathan Rooney at Bruno's Magpies, helping the club achieve European football for the first time. During the 2022–23 season, he combined his senior coaching duties with managing the Magpies U23 side in the Gibraltar Intermediate League.
