= Colin Woodthorpe =

English footballer

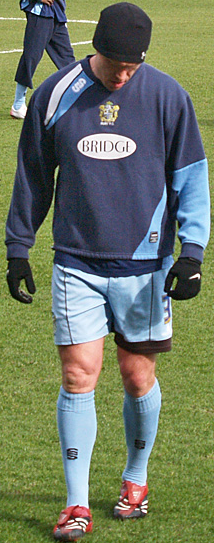

Personal information
- Full name: Colin John Woodthorpe
- Date of birth: 13 January 1969 (age 57)
- Place of birth: Liverpool, England
- Height: 6 ft 0 in (1.83 m)
- Position: Left back

Senior career*
Years	Team	Apps	(Gls)
1985–1990	Chester City	192	(7)
1990–1994	Norwich City	53	(1)
1994–1997	Aberdeen	65	(2)
1997–2002	Stockport County	171	(7)
2002–2008	Bury	211	(2)
Total		693	(19)

Managerial career
- 2010–2011: Colwyn Bay (assistant)
- 2011–2019: AFC Fylde (assistant)
- 2020–2022: Runcorn Linnets (assistant)
- 2022–2026: Chester (assistant)
- * Club domestic league appearances and goals

Colin Woodthorpe (born 13 January 1969 in Liverpool) is an English former footballer who played for Chester City, Norwich City, Aberdeen, Stockport County and Bury before moving into management roles.

== Playing career ==
=== Chester City ===
Woodthorpe made his first-team debut for Chester City in the 1985–86 season at Rochdale in the Associate Members' Cup as a 17-year-old apprentice.

The following season saw Woodthorpe make his Football League debut at Bury in a 1–1 draw and he ended the campaign with 30 league starts and two goals to his name. He also found the net in the northern final of the Associate Members' Cup, but Chester lost 2–1 on aggregate to Mansfield Town. He remained a regular in the left-back slot for the remainder of his time at the club and did not miss a game in the 1989–90 season. At the end of the campaign he joined top-flight side Norwich City for a six-figure sum, having made 155 league appearances and scored six times in four years with Chester's first team.

=== Norwich City ===
His four years with Norwich included some highlights, such as playing against Inter Milan in a UEFA Cup tie (1993), appearing in an FA Cup semi-final against Sunderland (1992) and scoring in a 3–0 win over Liverpool (1991).

=== Aberdeen ===
In 1994, he moved north of the border when he joined Aberdeen for £400,000, again providing matches in European competition. In three years at Pittodrie Woodthorpe made 51 league appearances before returning to the north-west with Stockport County in 1997.

=== Stockport County ===
Stockport County had just won promotion to Division One, a level the club would remain at until 2002 when they were relegated and Woodthorpe left on a free transfer, despite captaining the side in his final season at Edgeley Park.

=== Bury ===
Woodthorpe joined Bury at the start of the 2002–03 season. His first goal for the Shakers was a local derby winner at Rochdale in the Football League Trophy and his first season ended with Bury reaching the Division Three play-offs.

Woodthorpe remained a regular figure in the Bury defence, despite being 20 years older than some teammates and opponents. Aged 39, he was released by Bury in May 2008.

== Management career ==
In May 2010 Woodthorpe was appointed as assistant to player manager Dave Challinor at Northern Premier League club Colwyn Bay where they finished second and won promotion to Conference North via the play-offs, before later moving to AFC Fylde with Challinor in the summer 2012.

After almost eight years in the role and an FA Trophy win at Wembley, Challinor and Woodthorpe left AFC Fylde in October 2019, after a poor start to the season.

Woodthorpe joined Runcorn Linnets as assistant manager on 19 June 2020.

== Family ==
His son Nathan is also a footballer, at Chester.
