= Andy Kilner =

English footballer & manager

Personal information
- Full name: Andrew William Kilner
- Date of birth: 11 October 1966 (age 60)
- Place of birth: Bolton, England
- Position: Winger

Senior career*
Years	Team	Apps	(Gls)
1984–1986	Burnley	5	(0)
1986	→ IS Halmia (loan)		
1986–1988	Hyde United	35	(7)
1988	Altrincham		
1988–1989	Vänersborgs IF	20	(15)
1990	Jonsereds IF	29	(15)
1990–1992	Stockport County	42	(15)
1992	→ Rochdale (loan)	3	(0)
1992	→ Bury (loan)	5	(0)
1993–1994	Witton Albion		
1992–1993	Chorley		
1993–1997	Radcliffe Borough	66	(23)
1994	→ Fredrikstad FK (loan)	18	(15)

International career
1983–1984	England U17	9	(4)

Managerial career
- 1999–2001: Stockport County
- 2019-2023: Vänersborgs IF
- 2026-: Frändefors IF
- * Club domestic league appearances and goals

Andrew William Kilner (born 11 October 1966) is an English former professional footballer and manager. He began his career with Burnley, progressing through the club's youth system and making his professional debut in 1986 before being released. After spells with non-league sides Hyde United and Altrincham, he moved to Sweden where he spent two seasons.

After impressing during a trial spell, he joined Stockport County in 1990 and scores twice on his full debut. He went on to make 49 appearances in all competitions and spent time on loan at Rochdale and Bury before leaving the club in 1992. He later played for Witton Albion, Chorley, Radcliffe Borough and Norwegian side Fredrikstad FK before retiring due to injury at the age of 29.

After working for Bolton Wanderers in a community role, he returned to Stockport where he was placed in charge of their Centre of Excellence. In June 1999, he was appointed manager of the club following the sacking of Gary Megson. He remained in charge until October 2001 when he was sacked following a poor start to the 2001–02 season. He is now the manager of the Swedish football club, Vänersborgs IF as of 2019.

== Playing career ==
Born in Bolton, Kilner had represented England at youth level and began his club career in the youth system at Burnley, after rejecting an approach from Manchester United, signing his first professional contract on his seventeenth birthday. However, when Kilner joined the club in 1983, John Bond had been appointed manager with Kilner describing him as a "daunting character" and that eventually he "was dreading walking into the football club because of the atmosphere he had created at the time." Kilner was a regular at several youth levels for England and played in a 4–0 victory over Iceland that qualified the side for the semi-final of the European Youth Championships against West Germany. However, he was distraught when he was told that Bond planned to withdraw him from the squad due to his disapproval of the training methods of the team's manager Charles Hughes. Bond later relented on the condition that Kilner was available to play in a fixture against Manchester United, during which he suffered a broken leg that ruled him out for five months but also led to severe complications later in his career.

He was handed his professional debut on 1 January 1986 against Wrexham and made four further appearances in the following month without scoring, making his final appearance against Torquay United on 4 February 1986, before being released at the end of the season. He joined non-league side Hyde United in 1986, making his debut in a 2–0 defeat to Southport on 1 November 1986 before scoring his first goal in a 3–3 draw with Mossley in the FA Trophy three weeks later.

In 1988, he joined Altrincham in a player swap deal where he spent the remainder of the 1987–88 season. He returned to Sweden soon after, joining Vänersborgs IF before scoring 20 times in the 1990 season for Jonsereds IF despite suffering a broken leg for the second time in his career in 1989. When the Swedish league season ended, Kilner returned to England as part of his contract allowed him to play for other teams on a non-contract basis during the offseason due to only being paid half salary when the season ended. He was offered a trial with Stockport County by assistant manager John Sainty who had coached him as a youngster at Burnley. He played two matches for Stockport's reserve side, scoring once against Rochdale and twice against Crewe Alexandra. His performances saw him handed his first team debut on 1 January 1991 as a substitute in place of Paul Williams during a 1–1 draw with Gillingham. Three days later, he was named in the starting line-up for a league match against Wrexham and scored both goals in a 2–0 victory, signing a permanent contract with the club soon after. He quickly established himself in the first team and scored eleven league goals to help the club win promotion from the Fourth Division. However, manager Danny Bergara later made several tactical changes to the club's style of play that ultimately led to Kilner falling out of favour and, after brief loan spells with Rochdale and Bury, he left the club.

After a spell with Witton Albion, Chorley and Radcliffe Borough Kilner joined Norwegian third tier side Fredrikstad FK. He enjoyed a prolific season, scoring fifteen times in eighteen league matches including two hat-tricks, as the club finished in second place and missed out on promotion by a point. Fredrikstad hoped to extend the deal but could not afford to offer him a new deal and he subsequently left the club. During his time in Norway, Kilner had been receiving injections in his knee to keep playing but after a few years at Radcliffe Borough he was eventually forced to retire from playing at the age of 29 due to longstanding complications from the broken leg he suffered playing for Burnley.

== Management career ==
Following his retirement, Kilner was helped into a coaching role by Radcliffe Borough manager Kevin Glendon and joined Bolton Wanderers in 1995 as an assistant community officer. In 1996, he returned to Stockport as a community officer and gained his UEFA B coaching license. After improving the club's community football schemes, he was placed in charge of the club's Centre of Excellence by manager Gary Megson. Kilner was one of the first graduates on the newly introduced UEFA A License by the Football Association of England where other graduates included ex-Liverpool manager Brendan Rodgers.

When Megson was sacked by the club in June 1999, chairman Brendan Elwood appointed Kilner as his replacement, becoming the youngest manager in the Football League at the age of 32. He also helped the club reach the fifth round of the FA Cup for the first time in over fifty years. After a poor start to the 2001–02 season during which the club won one of their opening fifteen matches, including losing six of his last seven matches, Kilner was sacked by Stockport despite Elwood stating that he "won't be sacking Andy" several days before. Kilner later criticised Elwood, stating his belief that the club had continually sold their best players and provided insufficient funds to replace them. He commented, "If you sell your best players and replace them at a fraction of the cost, then it's not going to be the same". He also revealed that his wife and son had received verbal and physical abuse from Stockport fans prior to his sacking.

In 2002, he joined Sunderland as part of Mick McCarthy's coaching staff, also undertaking scouting assignments in the North West, where he worked until 2006.

On 28 November 2019, it was confirmed that Kilner would join Swedish side, Vänersborgs IF as their manager.

== Managerial statistics ==
Managerial record by team and tenure
Team	From	To	Record					Ref
Team	From	To	P	W	D	L	Win %	Ref
Stockport County	28 June 1999	29 October 2001	119	29	42	48	24.4	
Total			119	29	42	48	24.4	—
