= 2003–04 Preston North End F.C. season =

English football club season

Preston North End
2003–04 season
- Manager: Craig Brown
- Stadium: Deepdale
- Football League First Division: 15th
- FA Cup: Fourth Round
- League Cup: First Round

The 2003–04 season saw Preston North End compete in the Football League First Division where they finished in 15th position with 59 points.

== Final league table ==
Pos	Team	Pld	W	D	L	GF	GA	GD	Pts
13	Cardiff City	46	17	14	15	68	58	+10	65
14	Nottingham Forest	46	15	15	16	61	58	+3	60
15	Preston North End	46	15	14	17	69	71	−2	59
16	Watford	46	15	12	19	54	68	−14	57
17	Rotherham United	46	13	15	18	53	61	−8	54

Source: Soccerway
Rules for classification: 1) points; 2) goal difference; 3) number of goals scored.

== Results ==
Preston North End's score comes first

=== Legend ===
Win	Draw	Loss

=== Football League First Division ===
Match	Date	Opponent	Venue	Result	Attendance	Scorers
1	9 August 2003	West Ham United	H	1–2	18,246	Lewis
2	16 August 2003	Wigan Athletic	A	1–1	12,073	Fuller
3	23 August 2003	Sunderland	H	0–2	14,018	
4	25 August 2003	West Bromwich Albion	A	0–1	24,402	
5	30 August 2003	Stoke City	H	1–0	12,965	McKenna
6	13 September 2003	Bradford City	A	1–2	11,243	Fuller
7	16 September 2003	Coventry City	H	4–2	11,886	Fuller (2), Cresswell, Keane
8	20 September 2003	Rotherham United	H	4–1	12,340	Fuller, Cresswell, Alexander, O'Neil
9	27 September 2003	Walsall	A	1–2	6,981	Fuller
10	1 October 2003	Nottingham Forest	A	1–0	22,278	Abbott
11	4 October 2003	Wimbledon	H	1–0	13,801	Fuller
12	14 October 2003	Millwall	A	1–0	8,015	McKenna
13	18 October 2003	Reading	A	2–3	13,130	Fuller, Alexander
14	21 October 2003	Crewe Alexandra	A	1–2	7,012	Etuhu
15	25 October 2003	Ipswich Town	H	1–1	14,863	Healy
16	1 November 2003	Derby County	H	3–0	12,836	Healy, Alexander, Fuller
17	4 November 2003	Watford	H	2–1	11,152	Abbott, Healy
18	8 November 2003	Crystal Palace	A	1–1	14,608	Healy
19	22 November 2003	Norwich City	H	0–0	14,775	
20	29 November 2003	Sheffield United	A	0–2	21,003	
21	6 December 2003	Crystal Palace	H	4–1	12,836	Etuhu, Alexander, Healy, Lewis
22	9 December 2003	Cardiff City	A	2–2	13,703	Healy, Fuller
23	13 December 2003	Gillingham	A	1–0	7,602	Fuller
24	20 December 2003	Burnley	H	5–3	18,802	Fuller (3), Lewis, Healy
25	26 December 2003	Stoke City	A	1–1	20,126	Healy
26	28 December 2003	Crewe Alexandra	H	0–0	15,830	
27	10 January 2004	West Ham United	A	2–1	28,777	Healy, Fuller
28	17 January 2004	Wigan Athletic	H	2–4	19,161	Etuhu, Alexander
29	7 February 2004	West Bromwich Albion	H	3–0	16,569	Lewis, Healy, Alexander
30	14 February 2004	Watford	A	0–2	12,675	
31	21 February 2004	Millwall	H	1–2	12,903	Davis
32	28 February 2004	Ipswich Town	A	0–2	23,359	
33	2 March 2004	Reading	H	2–1	11,745	Healy (2)
34	6 March 2004	Burnley	H	1–1	15,837	Alexander
35	10 March 2004	Sunderland	A	3–3	27,181	Mears, Healy, Lewis
36	13 March 2004	Gillingham	H	0–0	13,111	
37	17 March 2004	Coventry City	A	1–4	13,142	Fuller
38	20 March 2004	Walsall	H	1–2	11,551	Alexander
39	27 March 2004	Rotherham United	A	0–1	6,268	
40	3 April 2004	Bradford City	H	1–0	12,376	Gemmill
41	10 April 2004	Wimbledon	A	3–3	2,866	McKenna, Lynch, Koumantarakis
42	12 April 2004	Nottingham Forest	H	2–2	15,117	McKenna, Lucketti
43	17 April 2004	Derby County	A	1–5	24,162	Mawéné (o.g.)
44	24 April 2004	Cardiff City	H	2–2	11,972	McKenna, Lewis
45	1 May 2004	Norwich City	A	2–3	23,673	McKenna, Healy
46	9 May 2004	Sheffield United	H	3–3	16,612	Alexander, Healy, Fuller

=== FA Cup ===
Match	Date	Opponent	Venue	Result	Attendance	Scorers
R3	3 January 2004	Reading	H	3–3	9,428	Fuller (2), O'Neil
R3 Replay	13 January 2004	Reading	A	2–1	9,314	Cresswell, Koumantarakis
R4	24 January 2004	Swansea City	A	1–2	10,200	Etuhu

=== Football League Cup ===
Match	Date	Opponent	Venue	Result	Attendance	Scorers
R1	12 August 2003	Notts County	H	0 – 0 (6 – 7 pens)	5,016	

== Squad statistics ==
No.	Pos.	Name	League		FA Cup		League Cup		Total	
No.	Pos.	Name	Apps	Goals	Apps	Goals	Apps	Goals	Apps	Goals
1	GK	(England) David Lucas	1(1)	0	0	0	0	0	1(1)	0
2	DF	(Scotland) Graham Alexander	45	9	3	0	1	0	49	9
3	DF	(Scotland) Brian O'Neil	27(2)	1	3	1	0	0	30(2)	2
4	MF	(Nigeria) Dickson Etuhu	23(8)	3	2	1	1	0	26(8)	4
5	DF	(England) Michael Jackson	41(2)	0	1	0	1	0	43(2)	0
6	DF	(England) Marlon Broomes	30	0	1	0	0	0	31	0
7	MF	(England) Lee Cartwright	2(10)	0	0	0	1	0	3(10)	0
8	MF	(Scotland) Craig Burley	1(3)	0	0	0	0	0	1(3)	0
8	MF	(Scotland) Scot Gemmill	7	1	0	0	0	0	7	1
9	FW	(Jamaica) Ricardo Fuller	37(1)	17	2	2	1	0	40(1)	19
10	FW	(South Africa) George Koumantarakis	1(6)	1	2	1	0	0	2(6)	2
11	FW	(Northern Ireland) David Healy	27(11)	15	3	0	0(1)	0	30(12)	15
13	GK	(England) Andy Lonergan	8	0	0	0	0	0	8	0
14	DF	(England) Lee Briscoe	2	0	0	0	0	0	2	0
15	DF	(Wales) Rob Edwards	16(8)	0	1	0	1	0	18(8)	0
16	MF	(England) Paul McKenna	39	6	3	0	0	0	42	6
17	MF	(United States) Eddie Lewis	26(7)	6	2	0	0	0	28(7)	6
18	FW	(Poland) Pawel Abbott	2(7)	2	0(3)	0	0(1)	0	2(11)	2
19	MF	(Republic of Ireland) Michael Keane	21(9)	1	2	0	1	0	23(9)	1
20	DF	(England) Chris Lucketti	37	1	1	0	1	0	39	1
22	DF	(Jamaica) Claude Davis	16(6)	1	2	0	0	0	18(6)	1
24	DF	(Jamaica) Tyrone Mears	11(1)	1	1	0	0(1)	0	12(2)	1
25	FW	(England) Richard Cresswell	41(4)	2	1	1	1	0	43(4)	3
26	FW	(France) Éric Skora	0(2)	0	0	0	1	0	1(2)	0
27	MF	(Republic of Ireland) Alan McCormack	2(3)	0	0	0	0	0	2(3)	0
32	DF	(England) Jeff Smith	0(5)	0	0	0	0	0	0(5)	0
34	FW	(Scotland) Simon Lynch	6(12)	1	0	0	0	0	6(12)	1
40	GK	(Scotland) Jonathan Gould	37	0	3	0	1	0	41	0
