= Northern Ireland national football team =

Men's national association football team

Northern Ireland
- Nickname(s): Green and White Army (GAWA); Norn Iron
- Association: Irish Football Association (IFA)
- Confederation: UEFA (Europe)
- Head coach: Michael O'Neill
- Captain: Conor Bradley
- Most caps: Steven Davis (140)
- Top scorer: David Healy (36)
- Home stadium: Windsor Park
- FIFA code: NIR
| First colours | Second colours |

FIFA ranking
- Current: 63 ▲1 (18 November 2026)
- Highest: 20 (September 2017)
- Lowest: 129 (September 2012)

First international
- Ireland 0–13 England (Belfast, Ireland; 18 February 1882) as Northern Ireland (Note: The team did not use the team name Northern Ireland until 1952, when the name was used in a one-off friendly against France. The 'Ulster Banner', the flag currently used by the Northern Ireland team, did not become the official flag of Northern Ireland until 1953. However, the team's first appearance after the end of Ireland (IFA) was against England in October 1950 in the 1950–51 British Home Championship.); Ireland 1–4 England (Belfast, Northern Ireland; 7 October 1950) France 3–1 Northern Ireland (Colombes, France; 11 November 1952)

Biggest win
- Ireland 7–0 Wales (Belfast, Ireland; 1 February 1930) as Northern Ireland; Northern Ireland 5–0 Cyprus (Belfast, Northern Ireland; 21 April 1971); Faroe Islands 0–5 Northern Ireland (Landskrona, Sweden; 11 September 1991); Northern Ireland 5–0 Bulgaria (Belfast, Northern Ireland; 15 October 2024)

Biggest defeat
- Ireland 0–13 England (Belfast, Ireland; 18 February 1882) as Northern Ireland; Netherlands 6–0 Northern Ireland (Amsterdam, Netherlands; 2 June 2012)

World Cup
- Appearances: 3 (first in 1958, last in 1986)
- Best result: Quarter-finals (1958)

European Championship
- Appearances: 1 (first in 2016)
- Best result: Round of 16 (2016)

Ulster Banner, the flag of the Northern Ireland national football team

The Northern Ireland national football team (also known as the Green and White Army - GAWA) represents Northern Ireland in men's international association football. From 1882 to 1950, all of Ireland was represented by a single side, the Ireland national football team, organised by the Irish Football Association (IFA). In 1921, the jurisdiction of the IFA was reduced to Northern Ireland following the secession of clubs in the soon-to-be Irish Free State, although its national team included players from all of Ireland until 1950, and used the name Ireland until the 1970s. (Note: The last match played as Ireland was in 1978 against Scotland. However, apart from this match, all British Championship matches had been played as "Northern Ireland" since the 1973–74 tournament. In the 1972–73 tournament, the first two matches were played as "Ireland" and the third as "Northern Ireland". In the 1971–72 tournament, the first was played as "Ireland" and the second and third as "Northern Ireland". 1970–71 was the last tournament in which all matches were played under the name "Ireland".) The Football Association of Ireland (FAI) organises the separate Republic of Ireland national football team.

Although part of Ireland has always had a representative side that plays in major professional tournaments – whether alongside the rest of Ireland pre-1922 or as its own entity – though not in the Olympic Games, as the International Olympic Committee (IOC) has always recognised United Kingdom representative sides, and currently Northern Irish athletes compete for either Great Britain or Ireland.

Northern Ireland has competed in three FIFA World Cups, reaching the quarter-final stage in the 1958 and 1982 tournaments. Northern Ireland held the accolade of being the smallest nation to qualify for a World Cup Finals from their first appearance in 1958 until 2006, when Trinidad and Tobago qualified for the 2006 World Cup. At UEFA Euro 2016, the team made its first appearance at the European tournament and reached the round of 16. Northern Ireland last qualified for the World Cup in 1986.

== History ==
On 18 February 1882, 15 months after the founding of the Irish FA, Ireland made their international debut against England, losing 13–0 in a friendly played at Bloomfield in Belfast. This remains the record defeat for the team, and also England's largest winning margin. On 25 February 1882, Ireland played their second international, against Wales at the Racecourse Ground, Wrexham, and an equaliser from Johnston became Ireland's first ever goal.

In 1884, Ireland competed in the inaugural British Home Championship and lost all three games. Ireland did not win their first game until 19 February 1887, a 4–1 win over Wales in Belfast. Between their debut and this game, they had a run of 14 defeats and 1 draw, the longest run without a win in the 1800s. Despite the end of this run, heavy defeats continued. On 3 March 1888, they lost 11–0 to Wales and three weeks later, on 24 March, lost 10–2 to Scotland. Further heavy defeats came on 15 March 1890 when they lost 9–1 to England, on 18 February 1899 when they lost 13–2 to England and on 2 February 1901 when they lost 11–0 to Scotland.

In 1899, the Irish FA also changed its rules governing the selection of non-resident players. Before then the Ireland team selected its players exclusively from the Irish League, in particular the three Belfast-based clubs Linfield, Cliftonville and Distillery. On 4 March 1899, for the match against Wales, McAteer included four Irish players based in England. The change in policy produced dividends as Ireland won 1–0. Three weeks later, on 25 March, one of these four players, Archie Goodall, aged 34 years and 279 days, became the oldest player to score in international football during the 19th century when he scored Ireland's goal in a 9–1 defeat to Scotland.

In 1920, Ireland was partitioned into Northern Ireland and Southern Ireland. In 1922, Southern Ireland gained independence as the Irish Free State, later to become a republic under the name of Ireland. Amid these political upheavals, a rival football association, the Football Association of Ireland, emerged in Dublin in 1921 and organised a separate league and international team. In 1923, at a time when the home nations had withdrawn from FIFA, the FAI was recognised by FIFA as the governing body of the Irish Free State on the condition that it changed its name to the Football Association of the Irish Free State. The Irish FA continued to organise its national team on an all-Ireland basis.

Between 1928 and 1946, the IFA were not affiliated to FIFA and the two Ireland teams co-existed, never competing in the same competition. On 8 March 1950, however, in a 0–0 draw with Wales at the Racecourse Ground in a FIFA World Cup qualifier, the IFA fielded a team that included four players who were born in the Irish Free State. All four players had previously played for the FAI in their qualifiers and as a result had played for two different associations in the same FIFA World Cup tournament.

After complaints from the FAI, FIFA intervened and restricted players' eligibility based on the political border. In 1953 FIFA ruled neither team could be referred to as Ireland, decreeing that the FAI team be officially designated as the Republic of Ireland, while the IFA team was to become Northern Ireland.

== Past performances ==
=== British Home Championship ===
Until the 1950s, the major competition for Northern Ireland/Ireland was the British Home Championship. The team won the competition eight times, taking the title outright on three occasions. They were the last winners of the now defunct competition held in 1984, and hence still are the British champions, and the trophy remains the property of the Irish FA.

=== FIFA World Cup ===
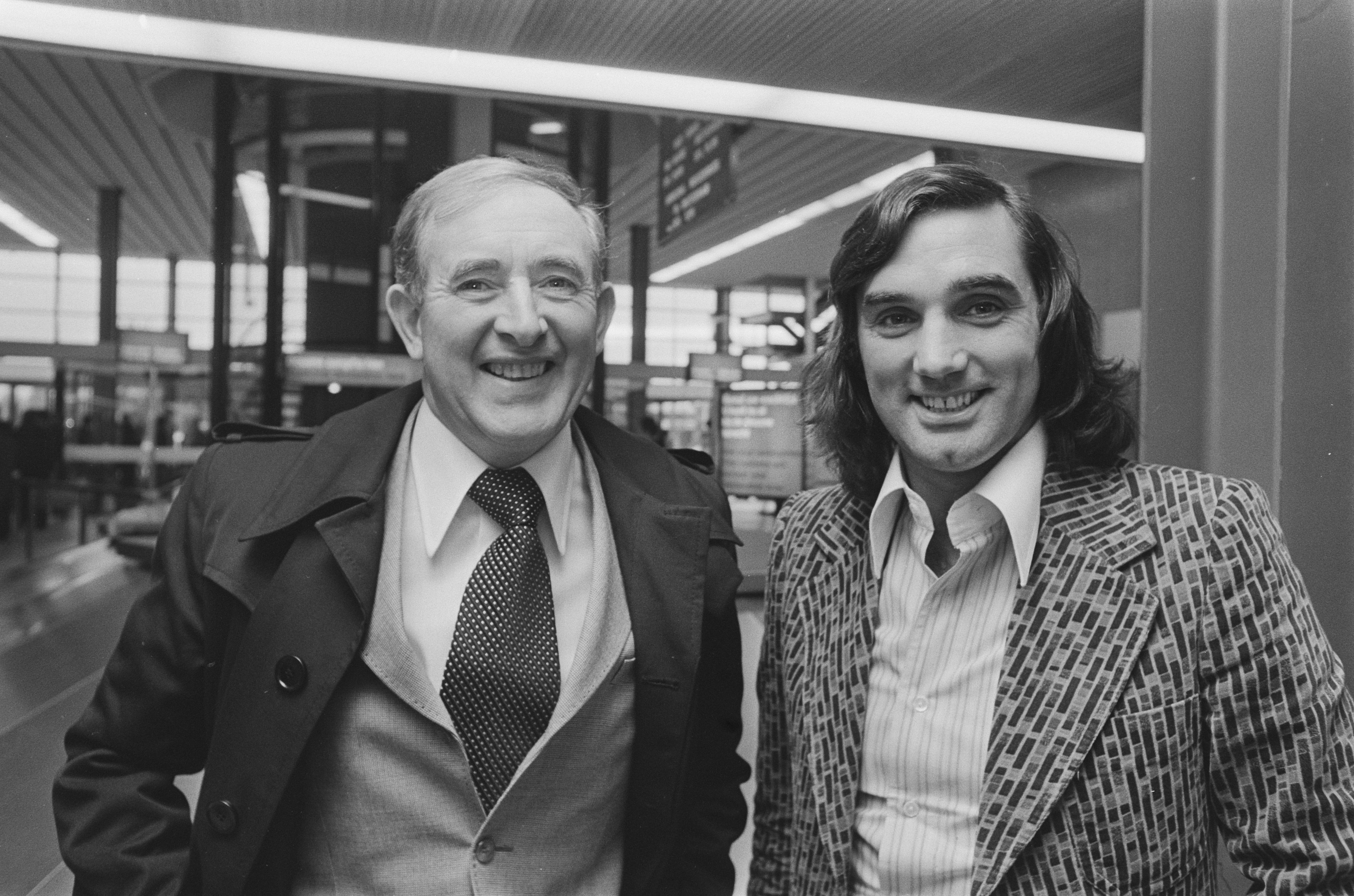
Danny Blanchflower (left) captained Northern Ireland at the 1958 FIFA World Cup, while George Best (right), winner of the 1968 Ballon d'Or, never reached a major international tournament with the team

Northern Ireland's best World Cup performance was in their first appearance in the finals, the 1958 World Cup, where they reached the quarter-finals after beating Czechoslovakia 2–1 in the play-off. They were knocked out by France, losing 4–0. In the 1958 competition, Northern Ireland became the least populous country to have qualified for the World Cup, a record that stood until Trinidad and Tobago qualified for the 2006 World Cup. Northern Ireland remains, however, the least populous country to have qualified for more than one World Cup finals tournament and to win a World Cup finals match.

Captain of the national side at the 1958 World Cup was Danny Blanchflower, who also captained Tottenham Hotspur in the English league and was twice footballer of the year in England. His younger brother Jackie was also a key member of the national team, and won two league titles in England with Manchester United, until his career was ended by injuries suffered in the Munich air disaster of February 1958.

Despite the presence of world class forward George Best, another Manchester United player, for the 1960s and 1970s, Northern Ireland failed to qualify for any major tournaments.

Northern Ireland qualified for the 1982 World Cup. Their opening game was against Yugoslavia at La Romareda stadium in Zaragoza. It was the international debut of 17-year-old Norman Whiteside, who became the youngest player ever in the World Cup finals, a record that still stands. The game finished goalless. Five days later, they drew 1–1 with Honduras, which was a disappointment, and many believed had doomed Northern Ireland's chances of advancing in the competition. They needed a win against hosts Spain in the third and final group game at the Mestalla Stadium in Valencia. They faced a partisan atmosphere with a mostly Spanish crowd and a Spanish-speaking referee in Héctor Ortiz who — according to Whiteside — was unwilling to punish dirty play from the Spanish players. A mistake from Spain goalkeeper Luis Arconada, however, gifted Gerry Armstrong the only goal of the game, and despite having Mal Donaghy sent off on 60 minutes, Northern Ireland went on to record a historic 1–0 win and top the first stage group.

A 2–2 draw with Austria at the Vicente Calderón Stadium meant that a win against France would take them into the semi-finals, however, a French team inspired by Michel Platini won 4–1 and eliminated Northern Ireland from the competition.

They also qualified for the 1986 World Cup where they went out in the Group stages, drawing Algeria and losing to Spain and Brazil. Billy Bingham, a member of the 1958 squad, was manager for both of these tournaments. They have not qualified for any other World Cups since.

=== Recent history ===
Lawrie Sanchez was appointed in January 2004 after a run of 13 games without a goal under the previous manager Sammy McIlroy, which was a European record for any international team until San Marino went over 20 games without scoring between October 2008 and August 2012. That run ended after his first game in charge, a 1–4 loss to Norway in a friendly in February 2004. The run of 16 games without a win ended after his second game, a 1–0 victory in a friendly over Estonia, with a largely experimental side, in March 2004.

On 7 September 2005, Northern Ireland beat England 1–0 in a 2006 World Cup qualifier at Windsor Park. David Healy scored the winner in the 73rd minute. Almost a year later, on 6 September 2006, Northern Ireland defeated Spain 3–2 in a qualifier for UEFA Euro 2008, with Healy scoring a hat-trick. In June 2007, Nigel Worthington was named manager in the place of Lawrie Sanchez, who took over at Fulham. Initially, Worthington took over until the end of the Euro 2008 qualifiers, but was later given a contract until the end of the Euro 2012 qualifiers. Michael O'Neill became manager in February 2012 after Worthington had resigned in October 2011 after a poor Euro 2012 qualification campaign.

The Northern Ireland team qualified for its first ever UEFA European Championship, Euro 2016 in France after 30 years without qualifying for a major tournament, after beating Greece 3–1 at Windsor Park on 8 October 2015. At the tournament, Northern Ireland were beaten 1–0 by Poland on 20 June 2016 followed by a 2–0 win against Ukraine on 16 June 2016 and finally a 1–0 loss against Germany in the group stage. That was enough to qualify for a Round of 16 spot where they lost 1–0 to Wales due to an unfortunate own goal by Gareth McAuley.

In November 2026, Northern Ireland, under the management of Michael O'Neill finished top of 2026–27 UEFA Nations League B Group 2 of the 2026–27 UEFA Nations League to secure promotion to 2028–29 UEFA Nations League A.

== Stadium ==
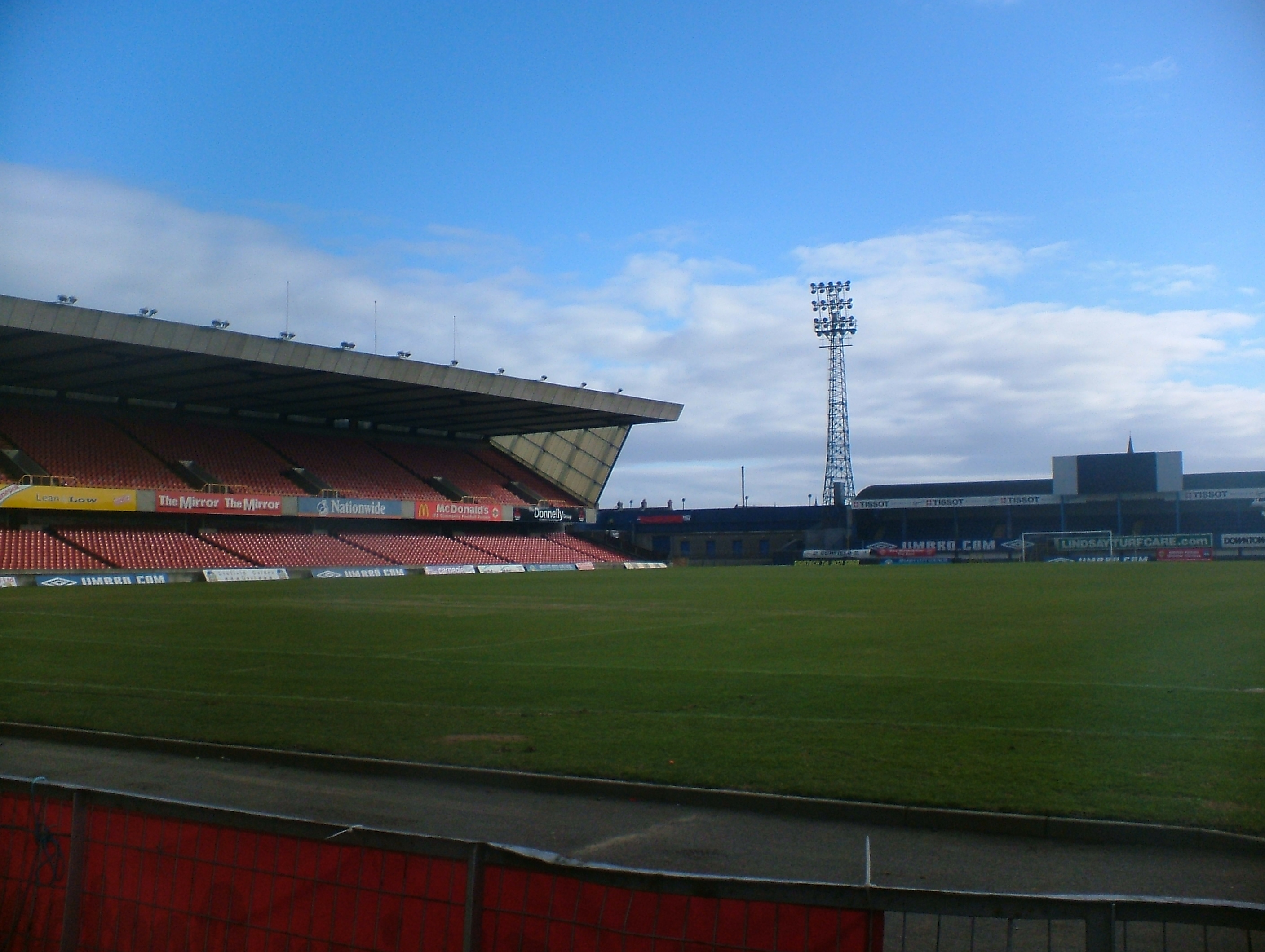
Windsor Park before the 2015 redevelopment – a view from the Kop Stand, showing the two-tiered North Stand and the low Railway stand behind the opposite goal

Northern Ireland play their home matches at the Clearer Twist National Stadium at Windsor Park, Belfast, home of Linfield, which they have use of on a 108-year lease, giving the owners 15% of revenue, including gate receipts and TV rights.

There was a proposal to build a multisports stadium for Northern Ireland at the disused Maze prison outside Lisburn for the use of Rugby, Gaelic games and football. This plan was given an "in principle" go-ahead by the Irish Football Association. However, it was opposed by fans, over 85% of whom in a match day poll conducted by the Amalgamation of Northern Ireland Supporters' Clubs ("AONISC") preferred to stay at a smaller new or redeveloped ground in the city of Belfast. The AONISC organised a protest against the move to the Maze at the game against Estonia in March 2006.

The issue assumed ever greater urgency by 2007, following a series of inspections which questioned the suitability of Windsor Park to host international football. Following a reduction of capacity due to the closure of the Railway Stand, the IFA made it known that they wished to terminate their contract for the use of the stadium. A report on health and safety in October 2007 indicated that the South Stand might have to be closed for internationals, which would further reduce the stadium's capacity to 9,000. In April 2008, Belfast City Council announced that they had commissioned Drivers Jonas to conduct a feasibility study into the building of a Sports Stadium in Belfast which could accommodate international football, which was followed at the beginning of May 2008 by speculation that the Maze Stadium project was going to be radically revised by Peter Robinson, the finance and personnel minister in the Northern Ireland Assembly, so that any construction might be used for purposes other than football, rugby union and Gaelic games. Given the time that is needed to build a new stadium, in the absence of significant work improving Windsor Park, it seemed to be likely that Northern Ireland might be forced to play their home games at a venue outside Northern Ireland for a period.

In March 2009, proposals were announced for the construction of a new 25,000-seat stadium in the Sydenham area of East Belfast as an alternative to the Maze proposal. This would form part of a major development, with links to both George Best Belfast City Airport and the Bangor railway line. The development would also include a hotel, and retail/leisure areas. The stadium itself would be used for both football and rugby union, with Glentoran and Ulster Rugby intended as tenants. Ulster GAA, however, who were a partner in the Maze proposal, stated that in the event of a new stadium being built in East Belfast, which is a major unionist area, their preference would then be to remain at Casement Park in nationalist west Belfast.

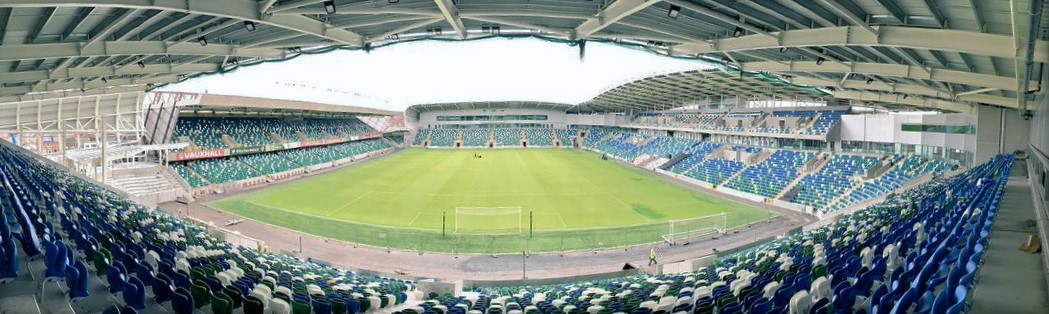
The new redeveloped Windsor Park. View from the Kop (West Stand) with only the corner between the West & North stands yet to be completed.

The IFA were initially non-committal about any of the proposals for improving their facilities, be it rebuilding Windsor Park, or supporting either the Maze or Sydenham proposals. In September 2009, however, they issued an announcement in favour of the redevelopment of Windsor Park. Although there were no specifics to this, Linfield had previously released a study with two proposals, of which the major one would be a £20 million rebuilding of the stadium, raising the spectator capacity to 20,000. In 2011, the Northern Ireland Executive allocated £138 million for a major programme of stadium redevelopment throughout Northern Ireland, with £28 million allocated to the redevelopment of Windsor Park. In June 2012, further details of the stadium's redevelopment were released. The plan was to redevelop Windsor Park into an 18,000 all-seater stadium with a series of phased works originally intended to begin in the summer of 2013. The redevelopment would include the demolition of the existing East and South Stand structures, to be replaced by new purpose built stands that would partially enclose the stadium; complete renovation of the existing North and West Stands; and construction of both new conferencing facilities and a new headquarters facility for the IFA.

In February 2013, planning permission for the redevelopment was granted. The cost of the project was estimated to be around £29.2 million, of which £25.2 million would come from government funding. It was initially planned for the work to begin in September 2013. Two months later, however, Irish Premiership club Crusaders began legal proceedings to have the process judicially reviewed. As owners of the site, rivals Linfield were in line to receive not only a redeveloped stadium, but also £200,000 per annum from the IFA in land rent instead of the existing agreement which entitled Linfield to 15% of match revenue. Crusaders believed this to be against European Union competition law as well as a form of state aid towards Linfield. In a hearing that took place on 22 May 2013, Crusaders' request was granted. It was ruled that it was a possibility for the redevelopment to be classed as state aid towards Linfield. The aspect of the challenge concerning competition law, however, was dismissed.

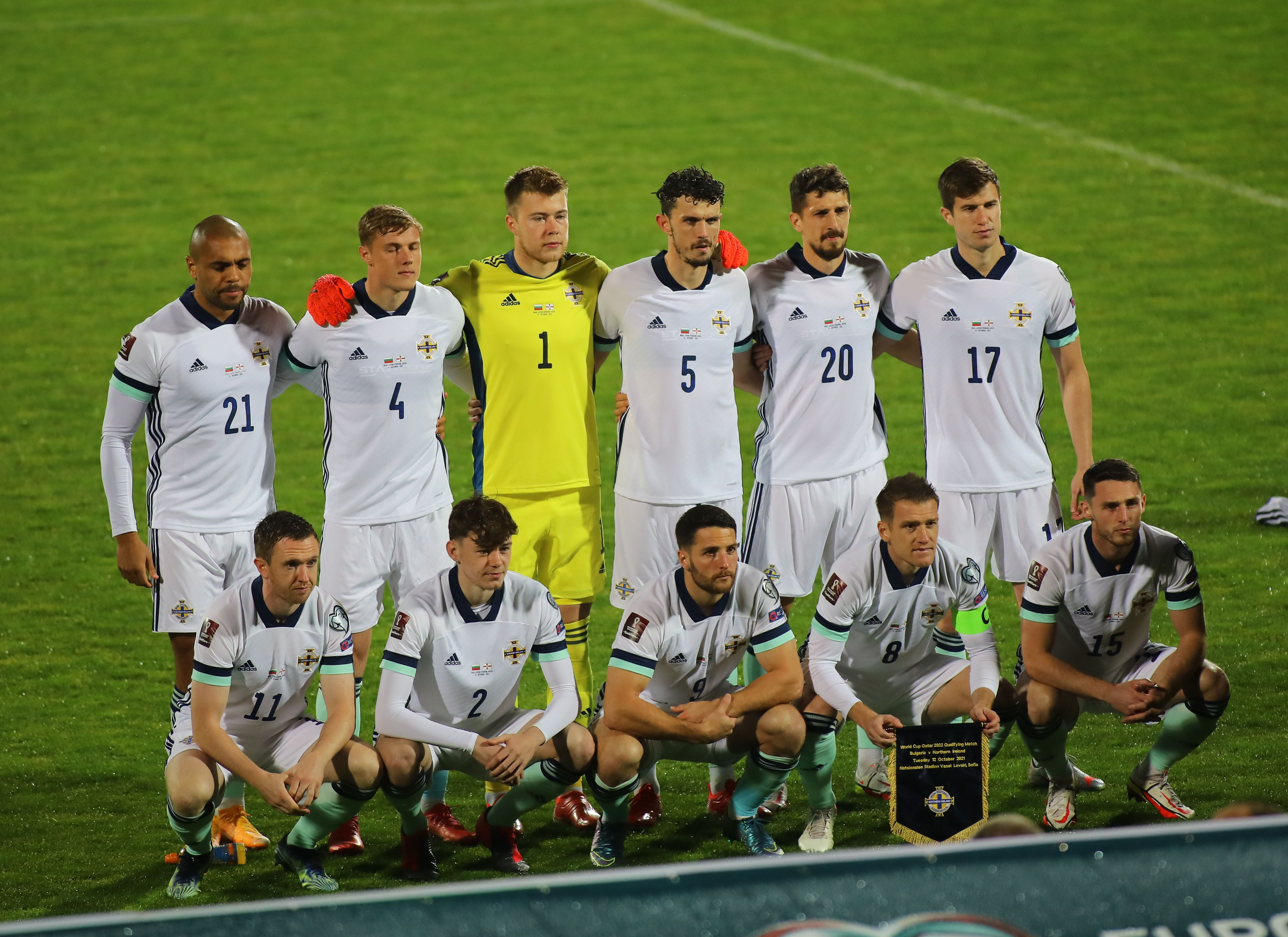
Northern Ireland team in 2021

In July 2013, Crusaders agreed to a possible settlement brought forward by the judicial review. The details of the settlement were not made public, but Crusaders said that it had the "potential to benefit the entirety of the football family". In September 2013, sports minister Carál Ní Chuilín said that she was still committed to making sure the redevelopment went ahead as scheduled, after previously stating that she would not sign off on the funding until the IFA resolved "governance issues" surrounding David Martin's return to the role of deputy president. In December 2013, three months after the work was originally scheduled to begin, the redevelopment was finally given the green light. The sports minister signed off on £31 million to complete the project. The redevelopment finally got under way on 6 May 2014 after the 2013–14 domestic season had finished, eight months later than originally planned. The work was completed in 2015.

== Team image ==
=== Colours ===
Northern Ireland football team's traditional colours are green and white. Green has long been a traditional symbolic colour for Ireland. The kit has been manufactured by Adidas since 2012. Prior to this, the kit was manufactured by Umbro.

=== Kit suppliers ===
| Kit provider | Period |
|---|---|
| (England) Umbro | 1975–1977 |
| (West Germany) Adidas | 1977–1990 |
| (England) Umbro | 1990–1994 |
| (Japan) Asics | 1994–1998 |
| (Belgium) Olympic Sportswear | 1998–1999 |
| (Belgium) Patrick | 1999–2004 |
| (England) Umbro | 2004–2012 |
| (Germany) Adidas | 2012– |

=== Supporters ===
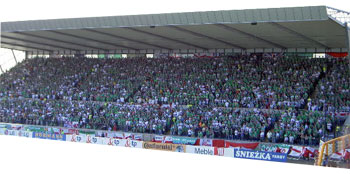
The Green and White Army

The Green and White Army is the name given to the fans that follow the Northern Ireland national football team.

Since the defeat of England in 2005, there has been an increased demand for tickets exceeding supply. Tongue-in-cheek songs such as "We're not Brazil, we're Northern Ireland" (sung to the tune of Battle Hymn of the Republic, an American Civil War song), "It's Just Like Watching Brazil" and "Stand up for the Ulstermen" are popular at home matches.

One of the first footballing celebrities was former Manchester United and Northern Ireland footballer George Best. The 1968 European Footballer of the Year, Best won 37 caps and scored 9 goals for his country.

Leading up to the Euro 2016, YouTuber Sean Kennedy released the song "Will Grigg's on Fire", a parody about Northern Irish national Will Grigg to the tune of "Freed From Desire" by Gala. The song became a popular chant and internet sensation. A studio version was released by London-based production duo Blonde, going on to reach number seven in the iTunes UK Top 100.

=== Historic controversy over sectarianism ===
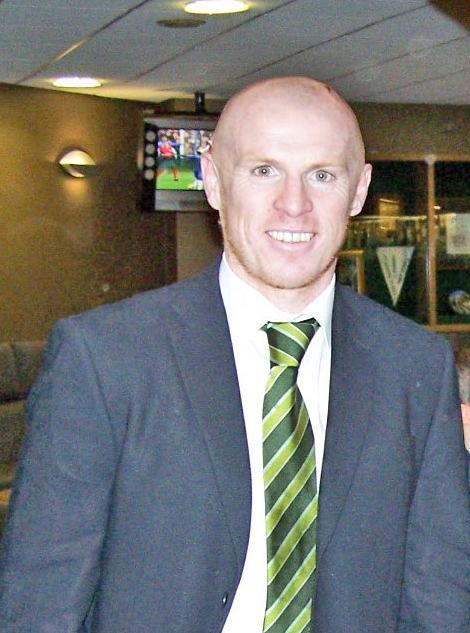
Former captain Neil Lennon retired from international football due to sectarian death threats

A small element of Northern Ireland's support was, in the past, regarded as sectarian.

In 2000 the IFA launched the "Football For All" campaign to tackle sectarianism and racism at Northern Ireland games. Michael Boyd, the director of football development at the IFA, recalled how the team struggled to even get a sponsor for their kit because the image of Northern Irish football was so poor. Attendance at matches was low; at a 1999 game against France, then reigning World Cup champions, IFA could not sell out the ground and there were problems with "sectarian singing and racist abuse." Neil Lennon, a Roman Catholic Celtic player who had been subject to sectarian abuse from Northern Ireland fans while playing for Northern Ireland in Windsor Park, was issued a death threat by Loyalists and retired from international football in 2002 as a result. Former Security Minister Jane Kennedy said the threat against Lennon 'disgraced Northern Ireland in the eyes of the world' and widened the divide between the association and Catholic players and supporters. However, the incident represented a turning point in the campaign against sectarianism in the IFA which had seen slow progress in the previous two years.

Steps taken to eradicate the sectarian element within the support have been successful. Lennon has been quick to praise these initiatives. He also praised the "Football For All" Outstanding Achievement Award Winner Stewart MacAfee for the work he has done to create a more inclusive atmosphere at international games.

People like Stewart are the unsung heroes who have been brave enough to challenge sectarianism and who have actively created a more fun, safe and family-orientated atmosphere at international games. Fans like Stewart have made the atmosphere at Northern Ireland football games in recent years the envy of Fans across not only Europe but World football. From a personal point of view I would like to thank them for their efforts.

— Neil Lennon

In 2006, Northern Ireland's supporters were awarded the Brussels International Supporters Award for their charity work, general good humour and behaviour and efforts to stamp out sectarianism. Representatives of the Amalgamation of Official Northern Ireland Supporters' Clubs received the award from UEFA and EU representatives prior to the Northern Ireland–Spain game at Windsor Park in September 2006.

Northern Ireland Minister of Culture, Arts and Leisure, Carál Ní Chuilín, the first senior Sinn Féin representative to attend an international at Windsor Park, commended "the very real efforts that have been made by the IFA to tackle sectarianism at their matches" after a match in August 2011. Twenty years after Lennon's resignation, Northern Ireland international games regularly sell out and women and children were "noticeable" amongst the spectators.

=== Media coverage ===
Premier Sports currently have the rights to show all of Northern Ireland's competitive international fixtures up until 2024.

Highlights of qualifiers are shown on BBC Northern Ireland with rights to World Cup Finals and European Championships held jointly by BBC and ITV - both channels shared coverage of Northern Ireland's games at Euro 2016.

Dating from the 1960s, Northern Ireland's games were shown live on BBC Northern Ireland, with highlights on network BBC via Sportsnight until the rights to home games were sold to Sky in 2007. In May 2013, Sky acquired the rights to all Northern Ireland qualifying games for UEFA Euro 2016 and the 2018 FIFA World Cup. From 2008 to 2013, BBC Northern Ireland held the rights to highlights of all of Northern Ireland's home international qualifiers. But in May 2013, ITV secured a deal to show highlights of the European Qualifiers for Euro 2016 and the 2018 World Cup, including Northern Ireland games, between 2014 and 2017.

In 2015, BBC Northern Ireland acquired the live rights to show Northern Ireland's friendlies in the run-up to UEFA Euro 2016, but the next two subsequent home friendlies against Croatia and New Zealand were shown on Premier Sports/eirSport until the contract ended before the 2018 World Cup.

== Results and fixtures ==
The following is a list of match results in the last 12 months, as well as any future matches that have been scheduled.

Win Draw Loss Fixture

=== 2026 ===
| 26 March 2026 World Cup qualification play-offs | Italy | 2–0 | Northern Ireland | Bergamo, Italy |
| 19:45 GMT; Match 707 | Tonali 56'; Kean 80' | Report | | Stadium: Stadio Atleti Azzurri d'Italia; Attendance: 23,439; Referee: Danny Makkelie (Netherlands) |

| 31 March Friendly | Wales | 1–1 | Northern Ireland | Cardiff, Wales |
| 19:45 BST; Match 708 | Thomas 46' | Report | Donley 22' | Stadium: Cardiff City Stadium; Attendance: 33,280; Referee: Robert Hennessy (Ireland) |

| 4 June Friendly | Northern Ireland | 1–0 | Guinea | La Línea de la Concepción, Spain |
| 17:00 BST; Match 709 | Atcheson 9' | Report | | Stadium: Estadio Municipal de La Línea de la Concepción; Attendance: 297; Referee: Seth Galia (Gibraltar) |

| 8 June Friendly | France | 3–1 | Northern Ireland | Villeneuve-d'Ascq, France |
| 20:10 BST; Match 710 | Olise 43', 49', 75' | Report | Kelly 64' | Stadium: Stade Pierre-Mauroy; Attendance: 43,272; Referee: Sascha Stegemann (Germany) |

| 25 September 2026–27 UEFA Nations League | Georgia | 0–1 | Northern Ireland | Tbilisi, Georgia |
| 17:00 BST; Match 711 | | Report | Charles 90+9' | Stadium: Boris Paichadze Dinamo Arena; Attendance: 7,470; Referee: Orel Grinfeeld (Israel) |

| 28 September 2026–27 UEFA Nations League | Northern Ireland | 0–0 | Hungary | Belfast, Northern Ireland |
| 19:45 BST; Match 712 | | Report | | Stadium: Windsor Park; Attendance: 18,082; Referee: Ricardo de Burgos Bengoetxea (Spain) |

| 2 October 2026–27 UEFA Nations League | Ukraine | 0–3 | Northern Ireland | Trnava, Slovakia (Note: Due to the Russian invasion of Ukraine, Ukraine are required to play their home matches at neutral venues until further notice.) |
| 19:45 BST; Match 713 | | Report | Brown 9', 61'; Price 22' | Stadium: Anton Malatinský Stadium; Attendance: 7,080; Referee: Jasper Vergoote (Belgium) |

| 5 October 2026–27 UEFA Nations League | Northern Ireland | 0–0 | Georgia | Belfast, Northern Ireland |
| 19:45 BST; Match 714 | | Report | | Stadium: Windsor Park; Attendance: 18,140; Referee: Sebastian Gishamer (Austria) |

| 14 November 2026–27 UEFA Nations League | Northern Ireland | 1–0 | Ukraine | Belfast, Northern Ireland |
| 19:45 GMT; Match 715 | Devlin 68' | Report | | Stadium: Windsor Park; Attendance: 18,225; Referee: François Letexier (France) |

| 17 November 2026–27 UEFA Nations League | Hungary | 1–1 | Northern Ireland | Budapest, Hungary |
| 19:45 GMT; Match 716 | Varga 35' | Report | Devenny 65' | Stadium: Puskás Aréna; Attendance: 55,306; Referee: Marco Guida (Italy) |

== Coaching staff ==
=== Current coaching staff ===
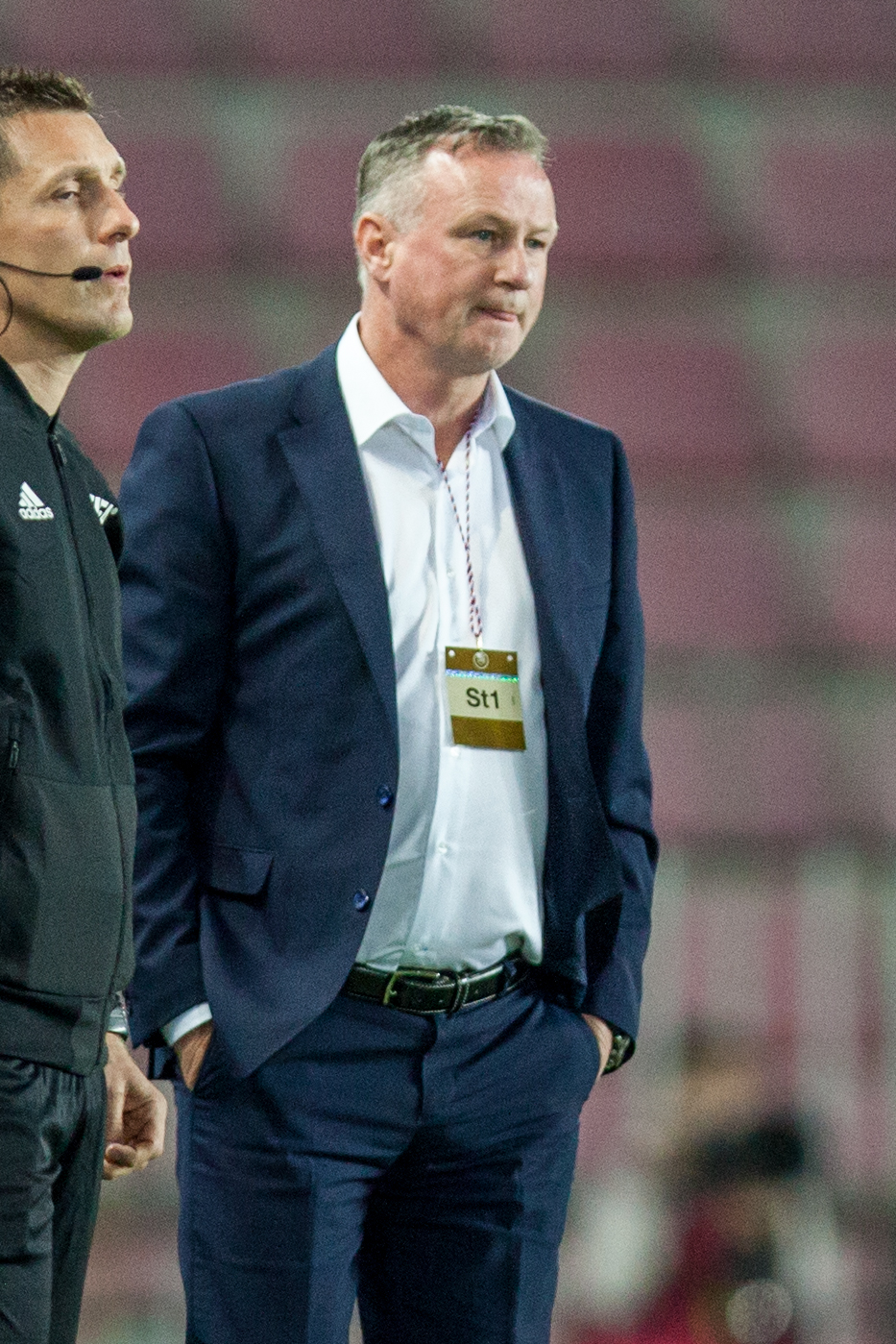
Current head coach Michael O'Neill

As of 20 March 2023

| Position | Name |
|---|---|
| Manager | (Northern Ireland) Michael O'Neill |
| Assistant Manager | (Northern Ireland) Jimmy Nicholl |
| Senior Coach | (Northern Ireland) Aaron Hughes |
| Senior Coach | (Republic of Ireland) Diarmuid O'Carroll |
| Goalkeeping Coach | (England) David Rouse |
| Team Doctor | (Northern Ireland) David White |
| Head Physiotherapist | (Northern Ireland) Caroline Woods |
| Physiotherapists | (Northern Ireland) Darren McMaster |
| Physiotherapists | (Northern Ireland) Neil McCullough |
| Sports Scientist | (Northern Ireland) Ricky McCann |
| Analyst | (Northern Ireland) Matthew Crawford |
| Equipment Manager | (Northern Ireland) Raymond Millar |
| Equipment Assistants | (Northern Ireland) Stevie Ferguson |
| Equipment Assistants | (Northern Ireland) Colin McGiffert |

=== Manager history ===
Current manager highlighted in green

Last updated after match against France on 5 October 2026.

| Manager | First Game | Last Game | Pld | W | D | L | GF | GA | GD | Win % | Draw % | Loss % |
|---|---|---|---|---|---|---|---|---|---|---|---|---|
| (Northern Ireland) Irish FA Selection Committee | 18 February 1882 vs. (England) | 12 May 1951 vs. (France) | 177 | 29 | 27 | 121 | 200 | 568 | –368 | 16.39% | 15.25% | 68.36% |
| (Northern Ireland) Peter Doherty | 6 October 1951 vs. (Scotland) | 9 May 1962 vs. (Netherlands) | 51 | 9 | 14 | 28 | 67 | 119 | –52 | 17.65% | 27.45% | 54.90% |
| (Northern Ireland) Bertie Peacock | 10 October 1962 vs. (Poland) | 12 April 1967 vs. (Wales) | 28 | 11 | 4 | 13 | 46 | 54 | –8 | 39.29% | 14.29% | 46.42% |
| (Northern Ireland) Billy Bingham | 21 October 1967 vs. (Scotland) | 22 May 1971 vs. (Wales) | 20 | 8 | 3 | 9 | 24 | 22 | +2 | 40.00% | 15.00% | 45.00% |
| (Northern Ireland) Terry Neill | 22 September 1971 vs. (Soviet Union) | 30 October 1974 vs. (Sweden) | 20 | 6 | 6 | 8 | 16 | 18 | –2 | 30.00% | 30.00% | 40.00% |
| (Northern Ireland) Dave Clements | 16 April 1975 vs. (Socialist Federal Republic of Yugoslavia) | 14 May 1976 vs. (Wales) | 11 | 3 | 2 | 6 | 7 | 15 | –8 | 27.27% | 18.18% | 54.55% |
| (Northern Ireland) Danny Blanchflower | 13 October 1976 vs. (Netherlands) | 21 November 1979 vs. (Republic of Ireland) | 24 | 6 | 5 | 13 | 19 | 38 | –19 | 25.00% | 20.83% | 54.17% |
| (Northern Ireland) Billy Bingham | 26 March 1980 vs. (Israel) | 17 November 1993 vs. (Republic of Ireland) | 98 | 32 | 31 | 35 | 91 | 107 | –16 | 32.65% | 31.64% | 35.71% |
| (Northern Ireland) Bryan Hamilton | 23 March 1994 vs. (Romania) | 11 October 1997 vs. (Portugal) | 31 | 8 | 8 | 15 | 34 | 41 | –7 | 25.81% | 25.81% | 48.38% |
| (England) Lawrie McMenemy | 25 March 1998 vs. (Slovakia) | 9 October 1999 vs. (Finland) | 14 | 4 | 3 | 7 | 9 | 25 | –16 | 28.57% | 21.43% | 50.00% |
| (Northern Ireland) Sammy McIlroy | 23 February 2000 vs. (Luxembourg) | 11 October 2003 vs. (Greece) | 29 | 5 | 7 | 17 | 19 | 40 | –21 | 17.24% | 24.14% | 58.62% |
| (Northern Ireland) Lawrie Sanchez | 18 February 2004 vs. (Norway) | 28 March 2007 vs. (Sweden) | 32 | 11 | 10 | 11 | 35 | 42 | –7 | 34.38% | 31.24% | 34.38% |
| (Northern Ireland) Nigel Worthington | 22 August 2007 vs. (Liechtenstein) | 11 October 2011 vs. (Italy) | 41 | 9 | 10 | 22 | 35 | 55 | –20 | 21.95% | 24.39% | 53.66% |
| (Northern Ireland) Michael O'Neill | 29 February 2012 vs. (Norway) | 19 November 2019 vs. (Germany) | 72 | 26 | 18 | 28 | 75 | 83 | –8 | 36.11% | 25.00% | 38.89% |
| (England) Ian Baraclough | 4 September 2020 vs. (Romania) | 27 September 2022 vs. (Greece) | 28 | 6 | 8 | 14 | 27 | 36 | –9 | 21.43% | 28.57% | 50.00% |
| (Northern Ireland) Michael O'Neill | 23 March 2023 vs. (San Marino) | | 40 | 16 | 8 | 16 | 45 | 43 | 2 | 40.00% | 20.00% | 40.00% |
| Total | | | 716 | 189 | 164 | 363 | 749 | 1306 | –557 | 26.40% | 22.91% | 50.70% |

Statistics include official FIFA recognised matches only

== Players ==
=== Current squad ===
The following players were called up for the 2026–27 UEFA Nations League B matches against Ukraine on 14 November and Hungary on 17 November 2026.

Caps and goals updated as of 17 November 2026, after the match against Hungary.

| No. | Pos. | Player | Date of birth (age) | Caps | Goals | Club |
|---|---|---|---|---|---|---|
| 1 | GK | Pierce Charles | 21 July 2005 (age 21) | 18 | 0 | (The Football Association) Queens Park Rangers |
| 12 | GK | Conor Hazard | 5 March 1998 (age 28) | 11 | 0 | (The Football Association) Wycombe Wanderers |
| 23 | GK | Dermot Mee | 20 November 2002 (age 23) | 0 | 0 | (The Football Association) Manchester United |
| 2 | DF | Terry Devlin | 6 November 2003 (age 23) | 9 | 1 | (The Football Association) Portsmouth |
| 4 | DF | Tom Atcheson | 22 September 2006 (age 20) | 8 | 1 | (The Football Association) Blackburn Rovers |
| 5 | DF | Trai Hume | 18 March 2002 (age 24) | 37 | 1 | (The Football Association) Sunderland |
| 15 | DF | Ruairi McConville | 1 May 2005 (age 21) | 18 | 0 | (The Football Association) Norwich City |
| 17 | DF | Paddy McNair | 27 April 1995 (age 31) | 85 | 7 | (The Football Association) Hull City |
| 18 | DF | Michael Forbes | 29 April 2004 (age 22) | 1 | 0 | (Scottish Football Association) Dundee United |
| 20 | DF | Brodie Spencer | 6 May 2004 (age 22) | 29 | 0 | (The Football Association) Oxford United |
| 22 | DF | Ciaron Brown | 14 January 1998 (age 28) | 36 | 2 | (The Football Association) Oxford United |
| 3 | MF | Justin Devenny | 11 October 2003 (age 23) | 20 | 2 | (The Football Association) Stoke City |
| 6 | MF | Jordan Thompson | 3 January 1997 (age 29) | 39 | 0 | (The Football Association) Preston North End |
| 7 | MF | Ethan Galbraith | 11 May 2001 (age 25) | 21 | 0 | (The Football Association) Stoke City |
| 14 | MF | Isaac Price | 26 September 2003 (age 23) | 38 | 11 | (The Football Association) West Bromwich Albion |
| 16 | MF | Patrick Kelly | 2 October 2004 (age 22) | 10 | 1 | (The Football Association) Barnsley |
| 19 | MF | Shea Charles | 5 November 2003 (age 23) | 41 | 2 | (The Football Association) Fulham |
| | MF | Jamie Donley | 3 January 2005 (age 21) | 15 | 2 | (The Football Association) Luton Town |
| 8 | FW | Callum Marshall | 28 November 2004 (age 21) | 17 | 0 | (The Football Association) Luton Town |
| 9 | FW | Kieran Morrison | 9 November 2006 (age 20) | 4 | 0 | (The Football Association) Sheffield Wednesday |
| 10 | FW | Eoin Kenny | 30 December 2005 (age 20) | 0 | 0 | (The Football Association) Portsmouth |
| 11 | FW | Paul Smyth | 10 September 1997 (age 29) | 26 | 2 | (The Football Association) Queens Park Rangers |
| 13 | FW | Braiden Graham | 7 November 2007 (age 19) | 0 | 0 | (The Football Association) Everton |
| 21 | FW | Josh Magennis | 15 May 1990 (age 36) | 95 | 12 | (The Football Association) Stevenage |

=== Recent call-ups ===
The following players have been called up to the Northern Ireland squad during the last 12 months.

| Pos. | Player | Date of birth (age) | Caps | Goals | Club | Latest call-up |
|---|---|---|---|---|---|---|
| GK | Bailey Peacock-Farrell | 29 October 1996 (age 30) | 53 | 0 | (England) Blackpool | v. Georgia, 5 October 2026 |
| GK | Luke Southwood | 6 December 1997 (age 28) | 2 | 0 | (England) Blackpool | v. France, 8 June 2026 |
| GK | Josh Clarke | 28 July 2004 (age 22) | 0 | 0 | (England) Doncaster Rovers | v. France, 8 June 2026 |
| DF | Eoin Toal | 15 February 1999 (age 27) | 11 | 0 | (England) Bolton Wanderers | v. Georgia, 5 October 2026 |
| DF | Daniel Ballard | 22 September 1999 (age 27) | 34 | 5 | (England) Sunderland | v. Hungary, 28 September 2026 ^{INJ} |
| MF | Jamie McDonnell | 16 February 2004 (age 22) | 4 | 0 | (England) Oxford United | v. Georgia, 25 September 2026 ^{INJ} |
| MF | Ali McCann | 4 December 1999 (age 26) | 35 | 1 | (England) Preston North End | v. France, 8 June 2026 |
| MF | George Saville | 1 June 1993 (age 33) | 64 | 0 | (England) Luton Town | v. Wales, 31 March 2026 |
| MF | Brad Lyons | 26 May 1997 (age 29) | 8 | 0 | (Scotland) Aberdeen | v. Wales, 31 March 2026 |
| FW | Ceadach O'Neill | 10 April 2008 (age 18) | 4 | 0 | (England) Arsenal | v. Ukraine, 14 November 2026 ^{INJ} |
| FW | Dion Charles | 7 October 1995 (age 31) | 34 | 4 | (England) Blackpool | v. Georgia, 5 October 2026 |
| FW | Jamie Reid | 15 July 1994 (age 32) | 16 | 2 | (England) Stevenage | v. France, 8 June 2026 |
^{INJ} = Withdrew due to an injury.^{PRE} = Preliminary squad / standby.^{RET} = Retired from the national team.^{SUS} = Serving suspension.^{WTD} = Player withdrew from the squad due to non-injury issue.

== Individual records ==
As of 17 November 2026 after the match against Hungary.

Players still active are highlighted in green

=== Most appearances ===
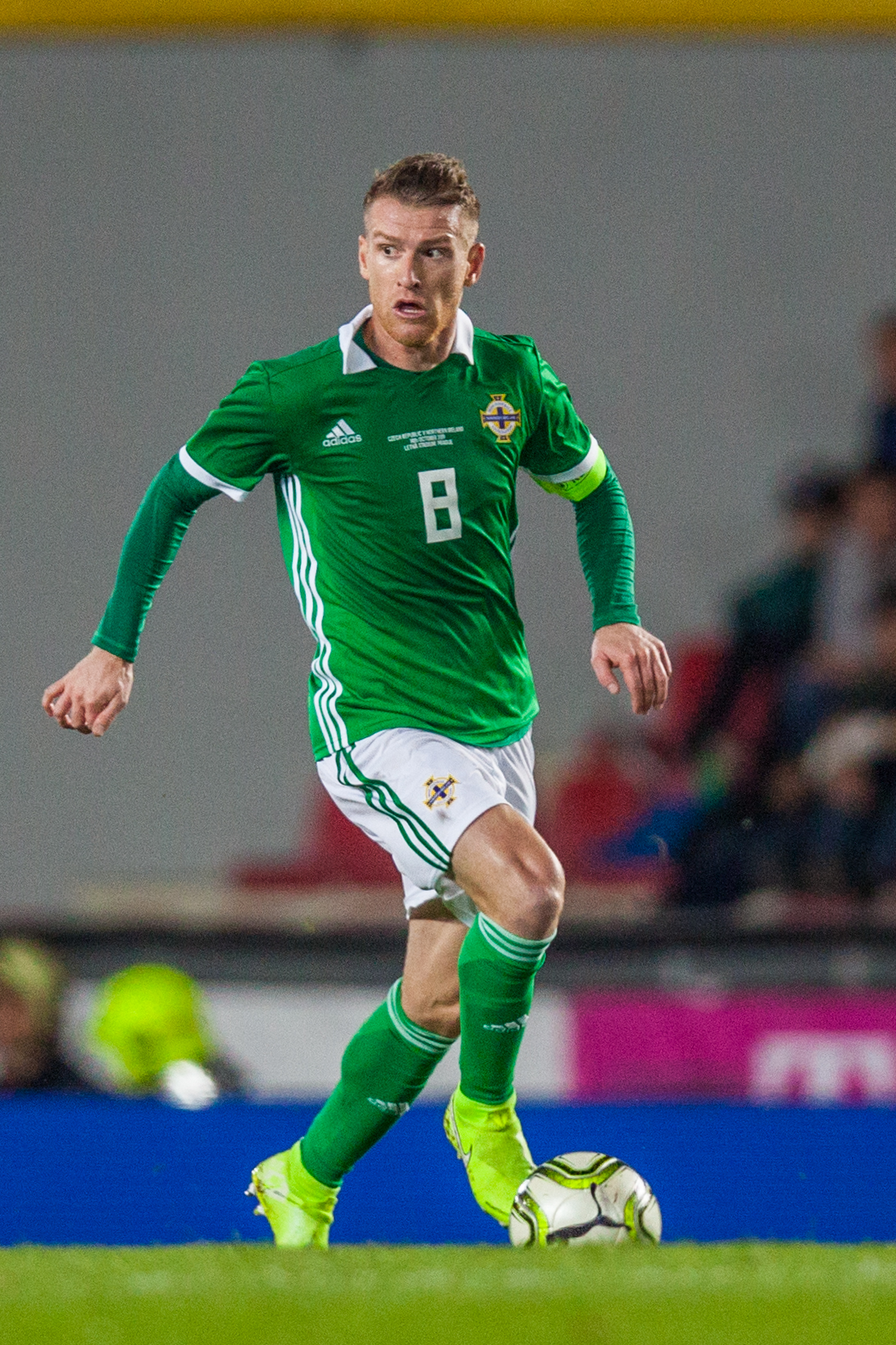
Midfielder Steven Davis is Northern Ireland's most capped player with 140 appearances.

| Rank | Player | Caps | Goals | Career |
|---|---|---|---|---|
| 1 | Steven Davis | 140 | 13 | 2005–2022 |
| 2 | Pat Jennings | 119 | 0 | 1964–1986 |
| 3 | Aaron Hughes | 112 | 1 | 1998–2018 |
| 4 | Jonny Evans | 107 | 6 | 2006–2024 |
| 5 | David Healy | 95 | 36 | 2000–2013 |
| 5 | Josh Magennis | 95 | 12 | 2010–present |
| 7 | Mal Donaghy | 91 | 0 | 1980–1994 |
| 8 | Kyle Lafferty | 89 | 20 | 2006–2022 |
| 9 | Sammy McIlroy | 88 | 5 | 1972–1986 |
| 9 | Maik Taylor | 88 | 0 | 1999–2011 |

=== Top goalscorers ===
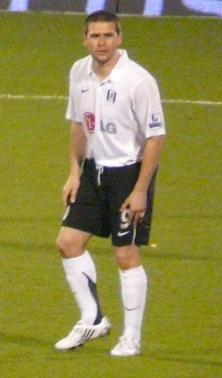
David Healy is Northern Ireland men team's all-time top goalscorer with 36 goals.

| Rank | Player | Goals | Caps | Ratio | Career |
|---|---|---|---|---|---|
| 1 | David Healy (list) | 36 | 95 | 0.38 | 2000–2013 |
| 2 | Kyle Lafferty | 20 | 89 | 0.22 | 2006–2022 |
| 3 | Billy Gillespie | 13 | 25 | 0.52 | 1913–1932 |
| 3 | Colin Clarke | 13 | 38 | 0.34 | 1986–1993 |
| 3 | Steven Davis | 13 | 140 | 0.09 | 2005–2022 |
| 6 | Joe Bambrick | 12 | 11 | 1.09 | 1928–1940 |
| 6 | Jimmy Quinn | 12 | 46 | 0.26 | 1984–1995 |
| 6 | Iain Dowie | 12 | 59 | 0.2 | 1990–1999 |
| 6 | Gerry Armstrong | 12 | 63 | 0.19 | 1977–1986 |
| 6 | Josh Magennis | 12 | 95 | 0.13 | 2010–present |

=== Most clean sheets ===
| Rank | Player | Clean Sheets | Caps | Ratio | Career |
|---|---|---|---|---|---|
| 1 | Pat Jennings | 45 | 119 | 0.38 | 1964–1986 |
| 2 | Maik Taylor | 34 | 88 | 0.39 | 1999–2011 |
| 3 | Roy Carroll | 18 | 45 | 0.4 | 1997–2017 |
| 3 | Bailey Peacock-Farrell | 18 | 53 | 0.34 | 2018–present |
| 5 | Michael McGovern | 16 | 33 | 0.48 | 2010–2020 |
| 6 | Tommy Wright | 11 | 31 | 0.35 | 1989–1999 |
| 7 | Pierce Charles | 10 | 18 | 0.56 | 2024–present |
| 8 | Alan Mannus | 7 | 9 | 0.78 | 2004–2016 |
| 8 | Conor Hazard | 7 | 11 | 0.64 | 2018–present |
| 10 | Elisha Scott | 6 | 31 | 0.19 | 1920–1936 |
| 10 | Jim Platt | 6 | 23 | 0.26 | 1976–1986 |
| 10 | Alan Fettis | 6 | 25 | 0.24 | 1991–1998 |

- A goalkeeper is awarded a clean sheet if he does not concede a goal during his time on the pitch.

=== Captains ===
| Rank | Player | Caps as Captain | Total Caps | Captaincy Span |
|---|---|---|---|---|
| 1 | Steven Davis | 82 | 140 | 2006–2022 |
| 2 | Aaron Hughes | 47 | 112 | 2002–2015 |
| 3 | Danny Blanchflower | 42 | 56 | 1954–1962 |
| 4 | Terry Neill | 38 | 59 | 1963–1973 |
| 5 | Martin O'Neill | 33 | 64 | 1980–1984 |
| 6 | Alan McDonald | 26 | 52 | 1990–1995 |
| 7 | Steve Lomas | 22 | 45 | 1997–2003 |
| 8 | Allan Hunter | 19 | 53 | 1974–1979 |
| 8 | Sammy McIlroy | 19 | 88 | 1980–1986 |
| 10 | John McClelland | 17 | 53 | 1984–1990 |

- Captaincy appearances are only awarded to players who were assigned the captaincy at the start of a game.

== Competitive record ==
For the all-time record of the national team against opposing nations, see the team's all-time record page.

=== FIFA World Cup ===
| FIFA World Cup record | | | | | | | | | | Qualification record | | | | | | Manager(s) |
| Year | Round | Pos. | Pld | W | D* | L | GF | GA | Squad | Pld | W | D | L | GF | GA | Manager(s) |
|---|---|---|---|---|---|---|---|---|---|---|---|---|---|---|---|---|
| (Uruguay) 1930 | Not a FIFA member | | | | | | | | | Not a FIFA member | | | | | | None |
| (Italy) 1934 | Not a FIFA member | | | | | | | | | Not a FIFA member | | | | | | None |
| (France) 1938 | Not a FIFA member | | | | | | | | | Not a FIFA member | | | | | | None |
| (Brazil) 1950 | Did not qualify | | | | | | | | | 3 | 0 | 1 | 2 | 4 | 17 | Irish FA Committee |
| (Switzerland) 1954 | Did not qualify | | | | | | | | | 3 | 1 | 0 | 2 | 4 | 7 | Peter Doherty |
| (Sweden) 1958 | Quarter-finals | 8th | 5 | 2 | 1 | 2 | 6 | 10 | Squad | 4 | 2 | 1 | 1 | 6 | 3 | Peter Doherty |
| (Chile) 1962 | Did not qualify | | | | | | | | | 4 | 1 | 0 | 3 | 7 | 8 | Peter Doherty |
| (England) 1966 | Did not qualify | | | | | | | | | 6 | 3 | 2 | 1 | 9 | 5 | Bertie Peacock |
| (Mexico) 1970 | Did not qualify | | | | | | | | | 4 | 2 | 1 | 1 | 7 | 3 | Billy Bingham |
| (West Germany) 1974 | Did not qualify | | | | | | | | | 6 | 1 | 3 | 2 | 5 | 6 | Terry Neill |
| (Argentina) 1978 | Did not qualify | | | | | | | | | 6 | 2 | 1 | 3 | 7 | 6 | Danny Blanchflower |
| (Spain) 1982 | Second group stage | 9th | 5 | 1 | 3 | 1 | 5 | 7 | Squad | 8 | 3 | 3 | 2 | 6 | 3 | Billy Bingham |
| (Mexico) 1986 | Group stage | 21st | 3 | 0 | 1 | 2 | 2 | 6 | Squad | 8 | 4 | 2 | 2 | 8 | 5 | Billy Bingham |
| (Italy) 1990 | Did not qualify | | | | | | | | | 8 | 2 | 1 | 5 | 6 | 12 | Billy Bingham |
| (United States) 1994 | Did not qualify | | | | | | | | | 12 | 5 | 3 | 4 | 14 | 13 | Billy Bingham |
| (France) 1998 | Did not qualify | | | | | | | | | 10 | 1 | 4 | 5 | 6 | 10 | Bryan Hamilton |
| (South Korea) (Japan) 2002 | Did not qualify | | | | | | | | | 10 | 3 | 2 | 5 | 11 | 12 | Sammy McIlroy |
| (Germany) 2006 | Did not qualify | | | | | | | | | 10 | 2 | 3 | 5 | 10 | 18 | Lawrie Sanchez |
| (South Africa) 2010 | Did not qualify | | | | | | | | | 10 | 4 | 3 | 3 | 13 | 9 | Nigel Worthington |
| (Brazil) 2014 | Did not qualify | | | | | | | | | 10 | 1 | 4 | 5 | 9 | 17 | Michael O'Neill |
| (Russia) 2018 | Did not qualify | | | | | | | | | 12 | 6 | 2 | 4 | 17 | 7 | Michael O'Neill |
| (Qatar) 2022 | Did not qualify | | | | | | | | | 8 | 2 | 3 | 3 | 6 | 7 | Ian Baraclough |
| (Canada) (Mexico) (United States) 2026 | Did not qualify | | | | | | | | | 7 | 3 | 0 | 4 | 7 | 8 | Michael O'Neill |
| (Morocco) (Portugal) (Spain) 2030 | To be determined | | | | | | | | | | | | | | | |
| (Saudi Arabia) 2034 | To be determined | | | | | | | | | | | | | | | |
| Total: 3/20 | Quarter-finals | 8th | 13 | 3 | 5 | 5 | 13 | 23 | — | 149 | 48 | 39 | 62 | 162 | 176 | — |
*Draws include knockout matches decided via penalty shoot-out.

=== UEFA European Championship ===
| UEFA European Championship record | | | | | | | | | | Qualification record | | | | | | Manager(s) |
| Year | Round | Pos. | Pld | W | D* | L | GF | GA | Squad | Pld | W | D | L | GF | GA | Manager(s) |
|---|---|---|---|---|---|---|---|---|---|---|---|---|---|---|---|---|
| (France) 1960 | Did not enter | | | | | | | | | Did not enter | | | | | | None |
| (Spain) 1964 | Did not qualify | | | | | | | | | 4 | 2 | 1 | 1 | 5 | 2 | Bertie Peacock |
| (Italy) 1968 | Did not qualify | | | | | | | | | 6 | 1 | 1 | 4 | 2 | 8 | Bertie Peacock, Billy Bingham (Note: Bertie Peacock managed for the first three qualifying matches. Billy Bingham managed the remainder of the qualification campaign.) |
| (Belgium) 1972 | Did not qualify | | | | | | | | | 6 | 2 | 2 | 2 | 10 | 6 | Billy Bingham, Terry Neill (Note: Billy Bingham managed for the first three qualifying matches. Terry Neill managed the remainder of the qualification campaign.) |
| (Socialist Federal Republic of Yugoslavia) 1976 | Did not qualify | | | | | | | | | 6 | 3 | 0 | 3 | 8 | 5 | Terry Neill, Dave Clements (Note: Terry Neill managed for the first two qualifying matches. Dave Clements managed the remainder of the qualification campaign.) |
| (Italy) 1980 | Did not qualify | | | | | | | | | 8 | 4 | 1 | 3 | 8 | 14 | Danny Blanchflower |
| (France) 1984 | Did not qualify | | | | | | | | | 8 | 5 | 1 | 2 | 8 | 5 | Billy Bingham |
| (West Germany) 1988 | Did not qualify | | | | | | | | | 6 | 1 | 1 | 4 | 2 | 10 | Billy Bingham |
| (Sweden) 1992 | Did not qualify | | | | | | | | | 8 | 2 | 3 | 3 | 11 | 11 | Billy Bingham |
| (England) 1996 | Did not qualify | | | | | | | | | 10 | 5 | 2 | 3 | 20 | 15 | Bryan Hamilton |
| (Belgium) (Netherlands) 2000 | Did not qualify | | | | | | | | | 8 | 1 | 2 | 5 | 4 | 19 | Lawrie McMenemy |
| (Portugal) 2004 | Did not qualify | | | | | | | | | 8 | 0 | 3 | 5 | 0 | 8 | Sammy McIlroy |
| (Austria) (Switzerland) 2008 | Did not qualify | | | | | | | | | 12 | 6 | 2 | 4 | 17 | 14 | Lawrie Sanchez, Nigel Worthington (Note: Lawrie Sanchez managed for the first six qualifying matches. Nigel Worthington managed the remainder of the qualification campaign.) |
| (Poland) (Ukraine) 2012 | Did not qualify | | | | | | | | | 10 | 2 | 3 | 5 | 9 | 13 | Nigel Worthington |
| (France) 2016 | Round of 16 | 16th | 4 | 1 | 0 | 3 | 2 | 3 | Squad | 10 | 6 | 3 | 1 | 16 | 8 | Michael O'Neill |
| (Europe) 2020 | Did not qualify | | | | | | | | | 10 | 4 | 2 | 4 | 11 | 16 | Michael O'Neill, Ian Baraclough (Note: Michael O'Neill managed the team for the eight qualifying group stage matches. Ian Baraclough managed the team in the UEFA Euro 2020 qualifying play-offs.) |
| (Germany) 2024 | Did not qualify | | | | | | | | | 10 | 3 | 0 | 7 | 9 | 13 | Michael O'Neill |
| (England) (Scotland) (Wales) (Republic of Ireland) 2028 | To be determined | | | | | | | | | To be determined | | | | | | |
| (Italy) (Turkey) 2032 | To be determined | | | | | | | | | To be determined | | | | | | |
| Total | Round of 16 | 1/17 | 4 | 1 | 0 | 3 | 2 | 3 | — | 130 | 47 | 27 | 56 | 140 | 167 | — |
*Draws include knockout matches decided via penalty shoot-out.

=== UEFA Nations League ===
| UEFA Nations League record | | | | | | | | | | | Manager(s) |
| Season | League | Group | Pld | W | D | L | GF | GA | P/R | RK | Manager(s) |
|---|---|---|---|---|---|---|---|---|---|---|---|
| 2018–19 | B | 3 | 4 | 0 | 0 | 4 | 2 | 7 | Same position | 24th | Michael O'Neill |
| 2020–21 | B | 1 | 6 | 0 | 2 | 4 | 4 | 11 | ▼ | 32nd | Ian Baraclough |
| 2022–23 | C | 2 | 6 | 1 | 2 | 3 | 7 | 10 | Same position | 44th | Ian Baraclough |
| 2024–25 | C | 3 | 6 | 3 | 2 | 1 | 11 | 3 | ▲ | 36th | Michael O'Neill |
| 2026–27 | B | 2 | 6 | 3 | 3 | 0 | 6 | 1 | ▲ | 20th | Michael O'Neill |
| Total | | | 28 | 7 | 9 | 12 | 30 | 32 | — | 20th | — |

=== Summary of results ===
All competitive matches

| Pld | W | D | L | GF | GA | GD |
|---|---|---|---|---|---|---|
| 577 | 152 | 127 | 298 | 621 | 1,079 | −458 |

All matches including friendlies^{‡}

| Pld | W | D | L | GF | GA | GD |
|---|---|---|---|---|---|---|
| 716 | 189 | 164 | 363 | 749 | 1,306 | −557 |

Results updated after match against Georgia on 17 November 2026.

== FIFA Rankings ==
Last updated on 17 November 2025.

=== FIFA Rankings ===
Worst Ranking Best Ranking Worst Mover Best Mover

| Rank | Year | Games Played | Won | Drawn | Lost | Best | | Worst | |
| Rank | Year | Games Played | Won | Drawn | Lost | Rank | Move | Rank | Move |
|---|---|---|---|---|---|---|---|---|---|
| 71 | 2024 | 10 | 5 | 3 | 2 | 71 | ▲2 (October) | 74 | ▼2 (February) |
| 72 | 2023 | 10 | 3 | 0 | 7 | 62 | ▲3 (November) | 75 | ▼10 (September) |
| 59 | 2022 | 8 | 2 | 2 | 4 | 54 | 0 | 59 | ▼4 (June) |
| 54 | 2021 | 12 | 4 | 3 | 5 | 45 | ▲4 (September) | 58 | ▼11 (October) |
| 45 | 2020 | 8 | 0 | 3 | 5 | 36 | 0 | 45 | ▼4 (November) |
| 36 | 2019 | 10 | 6 | 1 | 3 | 28 | ▲5 (June) | 36 | ▼4 (October) |
| 35 | 2018 | 9 | 2 | 2 | 5 | 24 | ▲2 (March) | 35 | ▼6 (October) |
| 24 | 2017 | 9 | 5 | 1 | 3 | 20 | ▲9 (April) | 35 | ▼3 (October) |
| 32 | 2016 | 13 | 5 | 3 | 5 | 25 | ▲4 (November) | 36 | ▼6 (October) |
| 30 | 2015 | 9 | 4 | 4 | 1 | 29 | ▲8 (March) | 51 | ▼4 (April) |
| 48 | 2014 | 7 | 3 | 1 | 3 | 43 | ▲28 (October) | 95 | ▼6 (August) |
| 89 | 2013 | 8 | 1 | 2 | 5 | 86 | ▲23 (September) | 119 | ▼22 (April) |
| 96 | 2012 | 7 | 0 | 4 | 3 | 86 | ▲17 (November) | 129 | ▼28 (September) |
| 88 | 2011 | 10 | 1 | 1 | 8 | 38 | ▲5 (February) | 89 | ▼25 (April) |
| 43 | 2010 | 10 | 1 | 3 | 4 | 39 | ▲14 (September) | 59 | ▼11 (March) |
| 40 | 2009 | 9 | 3 | 3 | 3 | 27 | ▲15 (April) | 52 | ▼9 (November) |
| 52 | 2008 | 8 | 2 | 2 | 4 | 32 | ▲2 (June) | 52 | ▼10 (December) |
| 32 | 2007 | 9 | 4 | 2 | 3 | 27 | ▲14 (April) | 49 | ▼9 (September) |
| 48 | 2006 | 8 | 4 | 1 | 3 | 45 | ▲21 (July) | 103 | ▼3 (November) |
| 103 | 2005 | 10 | 2 | 2 | 6 | 101 | ▲15 (September) | 116 | ▼4 (August) |
| 107 | 2004 | 11 | 3 | 6 | 2 | 107 | ▲9 (April) | 124 | ▼2 (July) |
| 122 | 2003 | 8 | 0 | 2 | 6 | 106 | ▲1 (June) | 122 | ▼7 (October) |
| 103 | 2002 | 6 | 0 | 3 | 3 | 89 | ▲1 (April) | 103 | ▼8 (September) |
| 88 | 2001 | 8 | 2 | 1 | 5 | 88 | ▲10 (September) | 107 | ▼4 (June) |
| 93 | 2000 | 7 | 3 | 1 | 3 | 84 | ▲5 (October) | 98 | ▼5 (May) |
| 84 | 1999 | 8 | 1 | 2 | 5 | 67 | ▲19 (January) | 84 | ▼7 (October) |
| 86 | 1998 | 6 | 3 | 1 | 2 | 86 | ▲7 (October) | 99 | ▼6 (February) |
| 93 | 1997 | 9 | 1 | 3 | 5 | 63 | ▲5 (April) | 93 | ▼10 (December) |
| 64 | 1996 | 7 | 1 | 3 | 3 | 48 | ▲11 (December) | 75 | ▼9 (October) |
| 45 | 1995 | 8 | 3 | 2 | 3 | 45 | ▲10 (September) | 55 | ▼5 (February) |
| 45 | 1994 | 7 | 3 | 0 | 4 | 33 | ▲7 (April) | 45 | ▼8 (June) |
| 39 | 1993 | 8 | 4 | 1 | 3 | 39 | ▲3 (August) | 42 | ▼2 (October) |

=== FIFA ranking history ===
View source data.

== Honours ==
=== Regional ===
- British Home Championship
  - Champions (8): 1903^{s}*, 1914*, 1956^{s}, 1958^{s}, 1959^{s}, 1964^{s}, 1980, 1984

Notes

- ^{s} Shared titles
- * Titles won as Ireland

== See also ==
- Northern Ireland national under-21 football team
- Northern Ireland national under-19 football team
- Northern Ireland national under-17 football team
- Northern Ireland national futsal team
