= David Healy (footballer) =

Northern Irish footballer (born 1979)

David Healy MBE
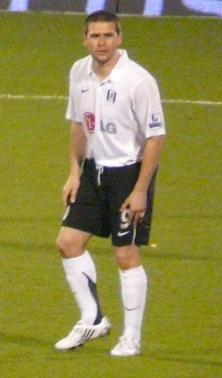
- Healy with Fulham in 2007

Personal information
- Full name: David Jonathan Healy
- Date of birth: 5 August 1979 (age 47)
- Place of birth: Killyleagh, County Down, Northern Ireland
- Height: 5 ft 8 in (1.73 m)
- Position: Striker

Team information
- Current team: Linfield (manager)

Youth career
- Crossgar
- Lisburn Youth
- Down Academy
- 1995–1999: Manchester United

Senior career*
Years	Team	Apps	(Gls)
1999–2001	Manchester United	1	(0)
2000	→ Port Vale (loan)	16	(3)
2000–2001	→ Preston North End (loan)	2	(1)
2001–2004	Preston North End	137	(44)
2003	→ Norwich City (loan)	5	(1)
2003	→ Norwich City (loan)	8	(1)
2004–2007	Leeds United	111	(29)
2007–2008	Fulham	30	(4)
2008–2011	Sunderland	13	(1)
2010	→ Ipswich Town (loan)	12	(1)
2010–2011	→ Doncaster Rovers (loan)	8	(2)
2011–2012	Rangers	19	(4)
2012–2013	Bury	16	(1)
Total		378	(92)

International career
1993–1994	Northern Ireland U15	10	(6)
1994–1995	Northern Ireland U16	2	(1)
1995–1997	Northern Ireland U18	5	(2)
1998–1999	Northern Ireland U21	8	(4)
1999	Northern Ireland B	1	(0)
2000–2013	Northern Ireland	95	(36)

Managerial career
- 2015–: Linfield
- * Club domestic league appearances and goals

David Jonathan Healy (born 5 August 1979) is a Northern Irish football manager and former professional footballer who is in charge at NIFL Premiership club Linfield. A striker during his playing career, he is the men's all-time leading scorer for Northern Ireland with 36 goals.

He also held the record for the joint highest scoring tally during a UEFA European Championship qualifying campaign, with 13 goals. He shared this record with Robert Lewandowski, until it was surpassed by Romelu Lukaku.

Healy began his career as a youth team player at Manchester United in 1995, turning professional in 1999, but signed for Preston North End two years later after a short loan spell. He spent three years with Preston, maintaining a healthy goal-to-games ratio, before transferring to Leeds United in 2004. After three years at Leeds, he moved on to Fulham for a season before settling at Sunderland in 2008. He moved north to Scotland to play for Rangers in January 2011. He helped the club to the SPL title in 2010–11 and also played in the 2011 League Cup final victory, before departing at the end of the 2011–12 season, when his contract expired. He joined Bury for a one-season spell in August 2012. In addition to these clubs, he has also played for Port Vale, Norwich City, Ipswich Town, and Doncaster Rovers on loan. Bury released him in May 2013, and he retired in November 2013 after failing to find a club. Before representing his country at a senior level, he also played for both the under-21 team and the B team.

He began his management career with Linfield in October 2015 and led the club to a NIFL Premiership, Irish Cup and County Antrim Shield treble in 2016–17. The following season proved a disappointment before they secured the league title and the Northern Ireland Football League Cup in 2018–19. They retained the Premiership trophy in 2019–20 and would win another Premiership and Irish Cup double in 2020–21. He then guided Linfield to a fourth consecutive league title in the 2021–22 season, though had to wait until the 2024–25 campaign for another league title.

== Club career ==
=== Manchester United ===
Healy was born and raised in Killyleagh, Northern Ireland, and played for Crossgar, Lisburn Youth and Down Academy High School in Downpatrick. He made eight appearances for Manchester United's junior B team in the 1995–96 season and signed for the club as a trainee in June 1996. He made 28 league appearances for the B team in 1996–97 and finished the season as top scorer with 25 goals. He signed as a professional in November 1997 and scored a combined 20 league goals for the A and B teams in 1997–98. He made his debut for the reserve team in April 1998, coming on as a substitute for Ole Gunnar Solskjær in a 2–0 win over Birmingham City. In 1998–99, he remained a prolific scorer for the youth team, scoring 11 goals in 11 appearances to finish as the team's top scorer for the season while also becoming a regular for the reserves. He only managed two goals in 12 league appearances. However, he was more productive in the Manchester Senior Cup, scoring four in five, including opening the scoring in the final against Oldham Athletic, which United won 3–0.

Healy made his first appearances for the Manchester United first-team in pre-season ahead of the 1999–2000 campaign, coming on for Andy Cole in a 9–0 win over Omagh Town on 3 August 1999, before coming on for Nicky Butt in a 2–0 win over Wigan Athletic the next day. He made his competitive senior debut for United on 13 October 1999, coming on for Danny Higginbotham in the 66th minute of a 3–0 away defeat to Aston Villa in the League Cup. He remained a regular in the reserves that season, playing 13 times and scoring eight goals before being sent on loan to Port Vale in February 2000. He managed just three goals in 16 games for Brian Horton's side, who were relegated to Division Two.

In 2000–01, Healy was included in the Manchester United squad for their Champions League second group stage match against Panathinaikos on 21 November 2000. However, he did not come off the bench. A week later, he made his second appearance for the club away to Sunderland, again in the League Cup; with the score at 1–1 early in extra time, Healy came on for Luke Chadwick, and hit the crossbar, but Sunderland were able to find a winner from a late penalty. He made his Premier League debut on 23 December 2000 in a 2–0 victory against Ipswich Town at Old Trafford; he came on as substitute in the 60th minute, and with 10 minutes remaining, he hit the post denying him a debut goal. This was his final appearance for United as he signed for First Division club Preston North End six days later, initially on loan to allow him to play against Sheffield United on 30 December; Healy scored the opening goal as Preston took a 2–0 lead, only to end up losing 3–2. A permanent move was completed on 3 January 2001, as Preston paid Manchester United a fee of £1.5 million, before Healy signed a four-and-a-half-year contract.

=== Preston North End ===
Healy made his debut for Preston against Sheffield United on 30 December 2000; he scored after just four minutes in the 3−2 loss at Bramall Lane. In the remainder of the 2000–01 season, Healy made 26 appearances for Preston and scored 10 goals. He was a virtual ever-present in the 2001–02 season, appearing in 44 league games and scoring 10 goals. In the 2002–03 season he was less successful after Craig Brown replaced the departed David Moyes. By the end of January 2003 he had made only 23 league appearances but scored five goals. Healy joined Nigel Worthington's Norwich City on a month's loan at the end of January. In the end, he stayed for the remainder of the season. However, in 13 appearances for the "Canaries" he scored only scored past Sheffield Wednesday and Wimbledon. Having attempted to sign him from Man United two years previously, Norwich attempted to sign Healy permanently from Preston but were denied by Brown. He found his scoring form again in 2003–04, and netted 15 times in 42 matches for Preston. He was given the club's Player of the Year award for this feat.

=== Leeds United ===
Aiming for a move away from Deepdale, Healy got his wish in October 2004, as he was signed by Leeds United for a £650,000 fee. In his first season at Leeds he was the club's joint top scorer alongside Brian Deane with seven goals, despite only joining Leeds halfway through the season. During his time at Elland Road he was linked with dozens of moves to other clubs, the most notable rumour reported in the press being a potential £3 million move to Manchester City. He again finished as joint top scorer in the 2005–06 season, both he and Rob Hulse on 14 goals. Leeds reached the play-off finals this season but lost in the final 3–0 to Watford. During the management of Kevin Blackwell, Healy found himself regularly being played out of position at Leeds, mainly as a right-winger, with Leeds rotating Hulse, Cresswell and Blake up front. Healy then finished the following 2006–07 season as Leeds' top scorer with ten goals. With Leeds relegated into League One, he left the club at the end of the campaign.

=== Fulham ===
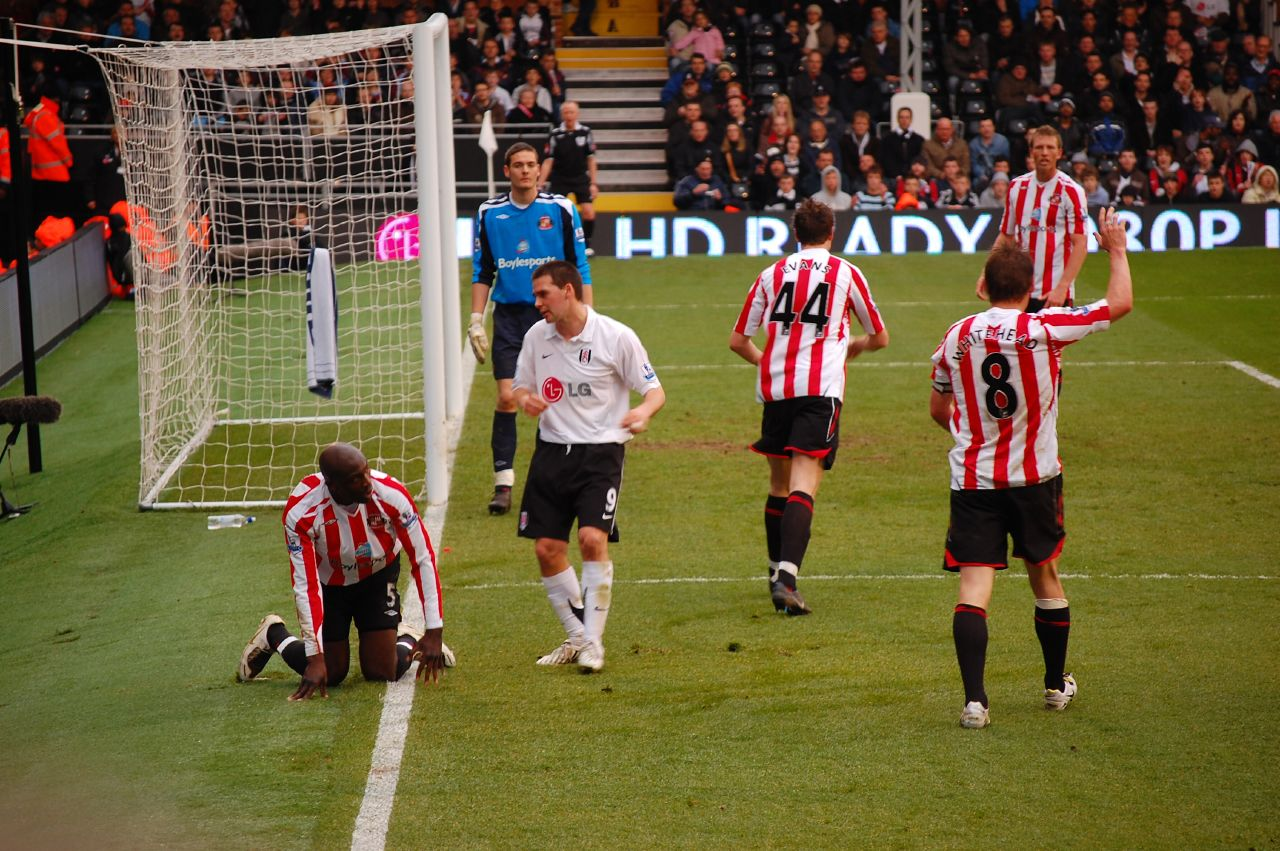
Healy (in white) playing against Sunderland in April 2008

Healy reunited with former Northern Ireland boss Lawrie Sanchez at Fulham in July 2007 for a reported fee of around £1.5 million. He scored his first goal for Fulham in a pre-season friendly against South China in the Asia Trophy, with a low diving header. He scored fifty seconds into his league debut for the club following a mistake from Arsenal keeper Jens Lehmann. He also found the net in his second game against Bolton Wanderers, in a 2–1 win at Craven Cottage. However, he only scored two further top-flight goals in the season (past Reading and Sunderland), as well as two cup goals past Bolton and Bristol Rovers. Following the sacking of Sanchez, new manager Roy Hodgson preferred a strike partnership of the American pairing of Brian McBride and Eddie Johnson, leaving Healy on the bench.

In July 2008, Healy caused controversy when he adopted the posture of a flute player (similar to a previous incident involving Paul Gascoigne) in response to a question posed by Celtic fans chanting, "Where were you on the Twelfth?" during a pre-season friendly match against Celtic at Craven Cottage. Healy subsequently apologised profusely for any offence he may have caused and signed many autographs for Celtic fans after the game. He remained out of favour with Roy Hodgson, who regarded his signings Andy Johnson and Bobby Zamora ahead of Healy in the pecking order.

=== Sunderland ===
In August 2008, Healy joined Sunderland on a three-year contract for an undisclosed fee, believed to be worth £1.2 million. Despite this sum he would never start a league game for the "Black Cats". Healy made his debut for Sunderland four days later in the League Cup and marked by scoring the winning goal in extra time against Nottingham Forest. Healy also scored in the FA Cup against Blackburn Rovers. Healy scored his first Premier League goal for the club in a 2–0 home win against Stoke City on 7 February 2009. He managed to score in every competition that Sunderland were entered into in his first season with the club. He was sent out on loan to Ipswich Town during the winter 2010 transfer window along with teammate Daryl Murphy. He made his debut against Middlesbrough on 6 February 2010, helping Ipswich to earn a point by setting up Murphy to score with a cross. He scored his first goal for Ipswich on 24 February 2010, in a 1–1 draw with Scunthorpe United, salvaging a point and ending his goal drought by scoring for the first time in over a year. Healy joined Doncaster Rovers on loan in November 2010, to fill the void left by the injured Billy Sharp. He marked his Doncaster debut with a goal, finding the net in a 2–1 win over Millwall on 6 November. Doncaster extended Healy's loan spell into a second month.

=== Rangers ===
In January 2011, Healy signed for Rangers on a six-month deal, intending to sign a longer contract. Having scored in his Leeds, Fulham, Sunderland, Doncaster and Northern Ireland debuts, he also marked his first Rangers appearance with a goal, coming off the bench to add the final goal of a 6–0 win over Motherwell on 12 February. Upon the expiry of his contract he signed a new one-year deal with the club, tying him to the Ibrox club until the end of the 2011–12 season. On 2 January 2012, Healy scored his second goal for the club, again against Motherwell, with the opener of a 3–0 win. His third goal for the club came the following week, when he scored the first of a 4–0 victory over Arbroath in the Scottish Cup. He netted his third league goal of the season for the "Gers" in a 4–0 win over Hibernian on 28 January, and got his fourth goal in a 4–1 victory over Dunfermline Athletic on 11 February. He left Ibrox at the end of the 2011–12 season following the expiration of his contract.

=== Bury ===
He signed a one-year deal with League One side Bury in August 2012. He had previously been linked with a return to Preston North End, but manager Graham Westley rejected the chance to re-sign the striker after finding that Preston fans still resented Healy for the manner of his departure eight years ago. He made a scoring debut for the "Shakers" on 25 August, converting a penalty in a 2–2 draw with Coventry City at the Ricoh Arena. He was limited to one goal in his 19 games in the 2012–13 campaign as Bury were relegated into League Two. He was one of 16 players released at the end of the season. Unable to find a club after his release and struggling with persistent ankle injuries, Healy announced his retirement from football on 3 December 2013.

On 31 July 2014, Healy played for Glenavon in a 5–0 loss in a pre-season friendly against his former club Leeds United. The match was part of Glenavon's 125th anniversary celebrations.

== International career ==
He made his debut for Northern Ireland on 23 February 2000, putting a brace past Luxembourg. He was still only 20 years old; having made his début for Manchester United the previous October, he had just joined Port Vale on loan. His competitive international début came in September 2000, in a World Cup qualifying game against Malta, and he scored his first competitive goal for his country a month later against Denmark.

On 6 June 2004, in a friendly game away to Trinidad and Tobago (his 35th international), he scored his 13th and 14th goals for Northern Ireland, thus equalling and overtaking Colin Clarke's record for the country. In September of that year, Healy was controversially sent off in Northern Ireland's 2–2 draw with Wales. After celebrating his goal to put Northern Ireland 2–0 up, he gestured towards the fans and the referee sent him off. Healy later explained that he was celebrating towards his family, and that was how he always celebrated when scoring for his then-club, Preston North End.

On 7 September 2005, at Windsor Park, Healy secured a famous victory for his country against England in a World Cup qualifier when he scored the only goal of the game. This was his nation's first win over the English since 1972.

He achieved his 50th cap and 20th international goal against Finland in August 2006, also playing as captain. A month later, on 6 September 2006, Healy became the first man since Colin Clarke to score a hat-trick for Northern Ireland and the first since George Best to do so in Belfast. His three goals gave Northern Ireland a historic 3–2 victory over Spain. Healy followed this feat with the winner against Latvia on 11 October 2006. In the following international game, against Liechtenstein, he scored a second hat-trick, thus becoming the first player ever to score two hat-tricks for Northern Ireland.

He scored both of Northern Ireland's goals in a 2–1 win against Sweden on 28 March 2007, and two more against Liechtenstein on 22 August, followed by a penalty away to Iceland on 12 September. On 17 November 2007, when he scored against Denmark, it was his 13th goal in the UEFA Euro 2008 qualifying Group F tournament (in eleven games). This made him the highest-ever goalscorer in a qualifying campaign for the UEFA European Championship. The previous record of twelve goals in ten games had been set by Davor Šuker of Croatia in 1996. As a result, Healy was presented with the award by Michel Platini, who quoted: "David Healy's record goes down in history and he beat a world-class striker in Davor Suker to do so. The outstanding performance of David in the qualifying competition of the European Championship and his goal tally of 13 goals is a new record and deserves to be recognised. I am sure that this record will last for some time to come and will be hard to beat. This is why I will be presenting him with a special award to celebrate his fantastic achievement."

In October 2008, Healy received several death threats after he welcomed an international goal he had scored by saying 'the famine is over'. The goal had come after an uncharacteristic drought at the time. Healy's comments were interpreted by some Scottish and Irish Catholics as a reference to Rangers fans' chant – "'the famine is over, why don't you go home?" Healy claimed to be oblivious that he had offended anyone, saying, "I'm so disappointed and upset that anyone could even try and make this link. And when told about this I was totally bemused." Despite finding a new club, Healy was left out of the Northern Ireland squad for the 2014 FIFA World Cup qualifiers in 2012 by new manager Michael O'Neill. On 14 November 2012, he marked his return to international duty with an equalising goal from the bench against Azerbaijan – it was his first international goal in four years.

He won a total of 95 senior caps, making him Northern Ireland's fourth most capped outfield player and fourth overall in the nation's all-time appearances chart behind Steven Davis (140), goalkeeper Pat Jennings (119), Aaron Hughes (112) and Jonny Evans (107). His 36 international goals make him the nation's all-time leading goalscorer by a considerable distance.

== Management career ==
=== Linfield ===
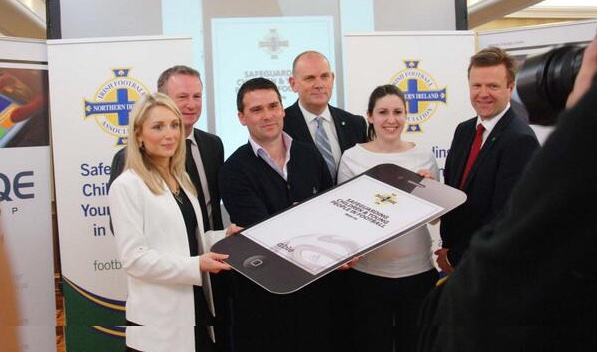
Healy with Jim Gamble launching the IFA Safeguarding Children App in April 2014

Healy was appointed manager of NIFL Premiership side Linfield in October 2015, the club he had supported all his life. He steered the "Blues" to a second-place finish in 2015–16, eight points behind Crusaders. On 7 February 2017, he won his first managerial honour as Linfield beat Crusaders 3–1 in the County Antrim Shield. On 25 February, he was given a six-game general ban after being dismissed from the touchline for the third time of the season. Despite this setback, the "Blues" went on to win the league title in 2016–17, and ended the campaign with a treble after beating Coleraine 3–0 in the final of the Irish Cup. He went on to add the Charity Shield to Linfield's honours with a 3–1 victory over Coleraine at The Oval. They went on to lose to Celtic in the second round of qualification for the UEFA Champions League in the 2017–18 season, and had a disappointing campaign domestically as they finished fourth in the league and exited both cup competitions at the quarter-finals. On 16 February 2019, Healy won his fifth domestic honour with Linfield as they won the Northern Irish League Cup final with a 1–0 over Ballymena United.

Healy won his second league title as a manager during the 2018–19 campaign, with Linfield finishing seven points ahead of second-placed Ballymena United and Healy also being named Manager of the Year. He also added the League Cup to his collection, as Linfield defeated Ballymena United 1–0 in the final. Linfield also reached the 2019 County Antrim Shield final, losing out 4–3 to Crusaders. He stated that he was looking to strengthen the first-team in the summer, saying that "we're not just going to be bringing in players for the sake of making up the numbers, we're going to be bringing in players who will be challenging for a starting berth".

The 2019–20 season was ended early due to the COVID-19 pandemic in Northern Ireland, and Linfield were crowned champions after finishing ahead of Coleraine on points per game. Healy said that it was unfortunate that they were unable to secure the title on the pitch but was pleased that they were "rightly crowned champions".

Linfield retained the league title in the 2020–21 campaign and on 21 May, Healy won his second Irish Cup when his Linfield side defeated Larne 2–1. He was linked with a move to Irish club Dundalk and stated that "I certainly don't want outstay my welcome [at Linfield]". Healy was also named as the NI Football Awards manager of the year for the third time.

Despite securing a fourth consecutive title at the end of the 2021–22 season, Healy stated that he had "never quite won the supporters over" and that online abuse was starting to affect his family. He was named as Manager of the Year for the fourth time at the annual Northern Ireland Football Awards.

Linfield won the 2022–23 edition of the Northern Ireland Football League Cup, beating Coleraine 2–0 in the final. They finished second in the Premiership at the end of the 2022–23 season, six points behind Larne. Linfield won the Northern Ireland Football League Cup by beating Portadown 3–1. The NIFL Premiership title again when to Larne, however, as Linfield finished five points behind them in second place. They also finished as runners-up in the Irish Cup following a 3–1 loss to Cliftonville after extra-time. Healy vowed to use the defeat as motivation for future success.

Healy signed Kieran Offord and Callumn Morrison in January 2025. He won his sixth league title as Linfield manager in the 2024–25 campaign, becoming the first team to secure the title before the league split into top and bottom for the final five games of the season. Linfield offered him a contract extension ahead of an approach from Scottish Premiership club Dundee. Linfield ended the 2025–26 season in fourth place. They won the League Cup after defeating Glentoran in the final.

== Personal life ==
Healy is married to Emma and they have three children: daughters Taylor and Tallulah, and son Jude. He was appointed Member of the Order of the British Empire (MBE) in the 2008 Birthday Honours for services to football. He was named BBC Northern Ireland Sports Personality of the Year in 2005 and 2007.

Healy endorsed Alex Easton for the 2024 United Kingdom general election in North Down.

== Career statistics ==
=== Club ===
Appearances and goals by club, season and competition
Club	Season	League			National cup (Note: Includes FA Cup, Scottish Cup)		League cup (Note: Includes Football League Cup, Scottish League Cup)		Other		Total	
Club	Season	Division	Apps	Goals	Apps	Goals	Apps	Goals	Apps	Goals	Apps	Goals
Manchester United	1999–2000	Premier League	0	0	0	0	1	0	0	0	1	0
Manchester United	2000–01	Premier League	1	0	0	0	1	0	0	0	2	0
Manchester United	Total		1	0	0	0	2	0	0	0	3	0
Port Vale (loan)	1999–2000	First Division	16	3	0	0	0	0	—		16	3
Preston North End	2000–01	First Division	1	1	0	0	0	0	0	0	1	1
Preston North End	2000–01	First Division	21	8	1	0	0	0	3 (Note: Appearance(s) in play-offs)	1	25	9
Preston North End	2001–02	First Division	44	10	3	0	2	0	—		49	10
Preston North End	2002–03	First Division	22	5	1	0	4	0	—		27	5
Preston North End	2003–04	First Division	38	15	3	0	1	0	—		42	15
Preston North End	2004–05	Championship	11	5	0	0	1	0	—		12	5
Preston North End	Total		137	44	8	0	8	0	3	1	156	45
Norwich City (loan)	2002–03	First Division	14	2	0	0	0	0	—		14	2
Leeds United	2004–05	Championship	28	7	1	0	0	0	—		29	7
Leeds United	2005–06	Championship	42	12	2	2	2	0	2	0	48	14
Leeds United	2006–07	Championship	41	10	1	0	2	0	0	0	44	10
Leeds United	Total		111	29	4	2	4	0	0	0	119	31
Fulham	2007–08	Premier League	30	4	2	1	2	1	—		34	6
Sunderland	2008–09	Premier League	10	1	2	1	2	1	—		14	3
Sunderland	2009–10	Premier League	3	0	2	0	2	0	—		7	0
Sunderland	Total		13	1	4	1	4	1	0	0	21	3
Ipswich Town (loan)	2009–10	Championship	12	1	0	0	0	0	—		12	1
Doncaster Rovers (loan)	2010–11	Championship	8	2	0	0	0	0	—		8	2
Rangers	2010–11	SPL	8	1	0	0	0	0	2 (Note: Appearance(s) in UEFA Europa League)	0	10	1
Rangers	2011–12	SPL	11	3	2	1	1	0	0	0	14	4
Rangers	Total		19	4	2	1	1	0	2	0	24	5
Bury	2012–13	League One	16	1	1	0	0	0	2 (Note: Appearance(s) in Football League Trophy)	0	19	1
Career total			377	91	21	5	21	2	9	1	426	98

=== International ===
Appearances and goals by national team and year
National team	Year	Apps	Goals
Northern Ireland	2000	7	5
Northern Ireland	2001	8	3
Northern Ireland	2002	6	0
Northern Ireland	2003	8	0
Northern Ireland	2004	10	8
Northern Ireland	2005	9	3
Northern Ireland	2006	6	5
Northern Ireland	2007	8	9
Northern Ireland	2008	8	2
Northern Ireland	2009	9	0
Northern Ireland	2010	5	0
Northern Ireland	2011	7	0
Northern Ireland	2012	3	1
Northern Ireland	2013	1	0
Total		95	36

=== Managerial ===
As of match played 21 November 2026

Managerial record by team and tenure
Team	From	To	Record							
Team	From	To	G	W	D	L	F	A	GD	Win %
Linfield	14 October 2015	present	568	356	94	118	1,138	521	+617	62.68
Total			568	356	94	118	1,138	521	+617	62.68

== Honours ==
=== As a player ===
Rangers

- Scottish Premier League: 2010–11
- Scottish League Cup: 2010–11

Individual

- Belfast Telegraph BBC Award: 2000
- Preston North End Player of the Year: 2003–04
- BBC Northern Ireland Sports Personality of the Year: 2005, 2007

=== As a manager ===
Linfield

- NIFL Premiership: 2016–17, 2018–19, 2019–20, 2020–21, 2021–22, 2024–25
- Irish Cup: 2016–17, 2020–21; runners-up: 2023–24
- Northern Ireland Football League Cup: 2018–19, 2022–23, 2023–24, 2025–26
- County Antrim Shield: 2016–17
- Charity Shield: 2017

Individual

- Northern Ireland Manager of the Year: 2018–19, 2019–20, 2020–21, 2021–22

== See also ==
- List of top international men's football goal scorers by country
