= List of international goals scored by David Healy =

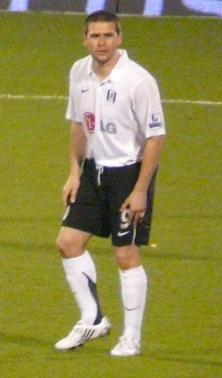
David Healy scored 36 international goals for Northern Ireland.

David Healy is a retired footballer, who represented the Northern Ireland national football team between 2000 and 2013. During his international career, he played 95 matches in which he scored 36 goals, becoming his country's top scorer. Healy made his international debut in a friendly against Luxembourg at the Stade Josy Barthel in February 2000, scoring two goals in a 3–1 victory. In June 2004, he became Northern Ireland's all-time top scorer, after netting his 14th international goal in a friendly against Trinidad and Tobago; the previous record of 13 goals was held jointly by Billy Gillespie and Colin Clarke. Kyle Lafferty is second to Healy in Northern Ireland's all-time scoring record, with 20 goals. Healy's final goal came in 2012, after a four-year goal drought, when he scored a 95th-minute equaliser against Azerbaijan during the 2014 FIFA World Cup qualification.

Healy is the only Northern Ireland player to have scored two international hat-tricks. Both were achieved during UEFA Euro 2008 qualification matches: the first came in a 3–2 win against Spain in September 2006, and the second in a 4–1 away defeat of Liechtenstein, six months later. Overall, Healy scored 13 goals during that qualification campaign, making him the highest-scoring player in a single European Championship qualification tournament. As a result of this record, he was presented with a special award by Michel Platini on behalf of UEFA. Healy held the record alone until October 2015, when Poland's Robert Lewandowski scored against the Republic of Ireland during qualification for UEFA Euro 2016 and matched Healy's feat.

During Healy's career, Northern Ireland failed to qualify for either the FIFA World Cup or UEFA European Championship finals; the majority of his goals came in qualification matches (22), as opposed to friendlies. Healy has scored more goals (five) against Liechtenstein than any other nation, and more than half of his goals (20) were scored at Windsor Park in Belfast. Upon retirement, he was described by national team manager Michael O'Neill as "an iconic player".

== List of international goals ==
Home team goals listed first. Northern Ireland score listed first, score column indicates score after each Healy goal.

List of international goals scored by David Healy
No.	Cap	Date	Venue	Opponent	Score	Result	Competition	Ref
1	1	23 February 2000	Stade Josy Barthel, Luxembourg City, Luxembourg	Luxembourg	1–0	3–1	Friendly	
2	1	23 February 2000	Stade Josy Barthel, Luxembourg City, Luxembourg	Luxembourg	2–1	3–1	Friendly	
3	2	28 March 2000	National Stadium, Ta' Qali, Malta	Malta	3–0	3–0	Friendly	
4	4	16 August 2000	Windsor Park, Belfast, Northern Ireland	FR Yugoslavia	1–0	1–2	Friendly	
5	6	7 October 2000	Windsor Park, Belfast, Northern Ireland	Denmark	1–0	1–1	2002 FIFA World Cup qualification	
6	10	28 March 2001	Balgarska Armia Stadium, Sofia, Bulgaria	Bulgaria	3–4	3–4	2002 FIFA World Cup qualification	
7	14	5 September 2001	Windsor Park, Belfast, Northern Ireland	Iceland	1–0	3–0	2002 FIFA World Cup qualification	
8	15	6 October 2001	National Stadium, Ta' Qali, Malta	Malta	1–0	1–0	2002 FIFA World Cup qualification	
9	30	18 February 2004	Windsor Park, Belfast, Northern Ireland	Norway	1–3	1–4	Friendly	
10	31	31 March 2004	A. Le Coq Arena, Tallinn, Estonia	Estonia	1–0	1–0	Friendly	
11	33	30 May 2004	Barbados National Stadium, Bridgetown, Barbados	Barbados	1–1	1–1	Friendly	
12	34	2 June 2004	Warner Park, Basseterre, Saint Kitts and Nevis	Saint Kitts and Nevis	1–0	2–0	Friendly	
13	35	6 June 2004	Dwight Yorke Stadium, Bacolet, Trinidad and Tobago	Trinidad and Tobago	1–0	3–0	Friendly	
14	35	6 June 2004	Dwight Yorke Stadium, Bacolet, Trinidad and Tobago	Trinidad and Tobago	3–0	3–0	Friendly	
15	38	8 September 2004	Millennium Stadium, Cardiff, Wales	Wales	2–0	2–2	2006 FIFA World Cup qualification	
16	39	13 October 2004	Windsor Park, Belfast, Northern Ireland	Austria	1–1	3–3	2006 FIFA World Cup qualification	
17	43	6 April 2005	Windsor Park, Belfast, Northern Ireland	Germany	1–0	1–4	Friendly	
18	44	17 August 2005	National Stadium, Ta' Qali, Malta	Malta	1–0	1–1	Friendly	
19	46	7 September 2005	Windsor Park, Belfast, Northern Ireland	England	1–0	1–0	2006 FIFA World Cup qualification	
20	50	16 August 2006	Olympic Stadium, Helsinki, Finland	Finland	1–0	2–1	Friendly	
21	52	6 September 2006	Windsor Park, Belfast, Northern Ireland	Spain	1–1	3–2	UEFA Euro 2008 qualifying	
22	52	6 September 2006	Windsor Park, Belfast, Northern Ireland	Spain	2–2	3–2	UEFA Euro 2008 qualifying	
23	52	6 September 2006	Windsor Park, Belfast, Northern Ireland	Spain	3–2	3–2	UEFA Euro 2008 qualifying	
24	54	11 October 2006	Windsor Park, Belfast, Northern Ireland	Latvia	1–0	1–0	UEFA Euro 2008 qualifying	
25	55	24 March 2007	Rheinpark Stadion, Vaduz, Liechtenstein	Liechtenstein	1–0	4–1	UEFA Euro 2008 qualifying	
26	55	24 March 2007	Rheinpark Stadion, Vaduz, Liechtenstein	Liechtenstein	2–0	4–1	UEFA Euro 2008 qualifying	
27	55	24 March 2007	Rheinpark Stadion, Vaduz, Liechtenstein	Liechtenstein	3–0	4–1	UEFA Euro 2008 qualifying	
28	56	28 March 2007	Windsor Park, Belfast, Northern Ireland	Sweden	1–1	2–1	UEFA Euro 2008 qualifying	
9	56	28 March 2007	Windsor Park, Belfast, Northern Ireland	Sweden	2–1	2–1	UEFA Euro 2008 qualifying	
30	57	22 August 2007	Windsor Park, Belfast, Northern Ireland	Liechtenstein	1–0	3–1	UEFA Euro 2008 qualifying	
31	57	22 August 2007	Windsor Park, Belfast, Northern Ireland	Liechtenstein	2–0	3–1	UEFA Euro 2008 qualifying	
32	59	12 September 2007	Laugardalsvöllur, Reykjavík, Iceland	Iceland	1–1	2–1	UEFA Euro 2008 qualifying	
33	61	17 November 2007	Windsor Park, Belfast, Northern Ireland	Denmark	2–1	2–1	UEFA Euro 2008 qualifying	
34	64	26 March 2008	Windsor Park, Belfast, Northern Ireland	Georgia	2–0	4–1	Friendly	
35	69	15 October 2008	Windsor Park, Belfast, Northern Ireland	San Marino	1–0	4–0	2010 FIFA World Cup qualification	
36	94	14 November 2012	Windsor Park, Belfast, Northern Ireland	Azerbaijan	1–1	1–1	2014 FIFA World Cup qualification	

== Hat-tricks ==
No.	Date	Venue	Opponent	Goals	Result	Competition	Ref.
1	6 September 2006	Windsor Park, Belfast, Northern Ireland	Spain	3 – (20', 64', 80')	3–2	UEFA Euro 2008 qualifying	
2	24 March 2007	Rheinpark Stadion, Vaduz, Liechtenstein	Liechtenstein	3 – (52', 74', 83')	4–1	UEFA Euro 2008 qualifying	

== Statistics ==
Goals and appearances by year
Year	Apps	Goals
2000	7	5
2001	8	3
2002	6	0
2003	8	0
2004	10	8
2005	9	3
2006	6	5
2007	8	9
2008	8	2
2009	9	0
2010	5	0
2011	7	0
2012	3	1
2013	1	0
Total	95	36

Goals and appearances by competition
Competition	Apps	Goals
Friendlies	34	14
UEFA European Championship qualification	29	13
FIFA World Cup qualification	31	9
Nations Cup	1	0
Total	95	36
