= 1999–2000 Preston North End F.C. season =

English football club season

Preston North End
1999–2000 season
- Chairman: Bryan Gray
- Manager: David Moyes
- Stadium: Deepdale
- Second Division: 1st (champions)
- FA Cup: Fifth round
- League Cup: Third round
- Football League Trophy: Second round
- Top goalscorer: League: Macken (22); All: Macken (25)
- Average home league attendance: 12,819

During the 1999–2000 English football season, Preston North End F.C. competed in the Football League Second Division.

== Season summary ==
In the 1999–2000 season, Preston finally made their return to the second tier of the Football League, after an absence of almost twenty years. Jon Macken, whom Gary Peters had signed from Manchester United two years previously, had a storming season scoring 22 league goals, his flair being reinforced by the team's solid spine of Teuvo Moilanen in goal, defenders Graham Alexander, Colin Murdock, Michael Jackson and Rob Edwards and a central midfield made up of workhorses Gregan and Rankine. Blackpool, who are Preston's archrivals got relegated to basement division the same season. This meant Preston took revenge from Blackpool after 30 years.

The championship was confirmed at Cambridge United on 24 April, a game which brought North End's seventh, and last, defeat of the season.

== Final league table ==
Pos	Team	Pld	W	D	L	GF	GA	GD	Pts	Promotion or relegation
1	Preston North End (C, P)	46	28	11	7	74	37	+37	95	Promotion to the First Division
2	Burnley (P)	46	25	13	8	69	47	+22	88	Promotion to the First Division
3	Gillingham (O, P)	46	25	10	11	79	48	+31	85	Qualification for the Second Division play-offs
4	Wigan Athletic	46	22	17	7	72	38	+34	83	Qualification for the Second Division play-offs
5	Millwall	46	23	13	10	76	50	+26	82	Qualification for the Second Division play-offs

Rules for classification: 1) Points; 2) Goal difference; 3) Goals scored
(C) Champions; (O) Play-off winners; (P) Promoted

== Results ==
Preston North End's score comes first

=== Legend ===
Win	Draw	Loss

=== Football League Second Division ===
Date	Opponent	Venue	Result	Attendance	Scorers
7 August 1999	Oldham Athletic	A	1–0	9,432	Macken
14 August 1999	Stoke City	H	2–1	11,465	Nogan, Murdock
21 August 1999	Wycombe Wanderers	A	1–1	5,091	Nogan
28 August 1999	Wigan Athletic	H	1–4	13,885	Basham
1 September 1999	Reading	A	2–2	7,628	Eyres, Basham
4 September 1999	Chesterfield	H	0–2	8,506	
11 September 1999	Burnley	H	0–0	13,708	
18 September 1999	Gillingham	A	2–0	6,610	Macken, Gregan
25 September 1999	Brentford	A	2–2	7,100	Macken, McKenna
2 October 1999	Cambridge United	H	2–1	9,522	Macken (2)
9 October 1999	Bristol City	H	1–0	10,042	Mathie
16 October 1999	Scunthorpe United	A	1–1	5,336	Macken
19 October 1999	Millwall	A	2–0	6,355	Cartwright, Nethercott (own goal)
23 October 1999	Brentford	H	2–1	10,382	Alexander (pen), Marshall (own goal)
3 November 1999	Bournemouth	H	3–0	9,630	McKenna, Macken, Alexander (pen)
6 November 1999	Colchester United	A	2–2	3,818	Mathie, Nogan
12 November 1999	Notts County	H	2–0	14,226	Macken (2)
23 November 1999	Luton Town	A	2–0	5,124	Eyres (2)
27 November 1999	Bury	A	3–1	6,469	Jackson, Gregan, Macken
4 December 1999	Oldham Athletic	H	2–0	10,970	Macken (2)
18 December 1999	Blackpool	H	3–0	16,821	Eyres (2), Appleton
26 December 1999	Wrexham	A	0–0	7,872	
28 December 1999	Bristol Rovers	H	2–1	16,680	Alexander (pen), Macken
3 January 2000	Cardiff City	A	4–0	10,142	Edwards, Alexander (2, 1 pen), Nogan
14 January 2000	Stoke City	A	1–2	10,285	Alexander (pen)
22 January 2000	Wycombe Wanderers	H	3–2	10,969	Murdock, Macken (2)
1 February 2000	Oxford United	A	4–0	5,164	Macken (2), Eyres, Appleton
5 February 2000	Reading	H	2–2	12,618	Macken, Jackson
12 February 2000	Chesterfield	A	1–0	4,726	Gregan
19 February 2000	Bury	H	1–1	13,901	Macken
26 February 2000	Gillingham	H	0–2	13,246	
4 March 2000	Burnley	A	3–0	22,310	Jackson, Macken, Edwards
7 March 2000	Colchester United	H	2–3	11,323	Angell (2)
11 March 2000	Bournemouth	A	1–0	5,317	Angell
14 March 2000	Oxford United	H	3–1	12,008	Angell (2), Macken
18 March 2000	Luton Town	H	1–0	13,731	Anderson
21 March 2000	Notts County	A	0–1	6,401	
25 March 2000	Wrexham	H	1–0	12,481	Anderson
1 April 2000	Blackpool	A	0–0	9,042	
4 April 2000	Wigan Athletic	A	1–0	15,993	Jackson
8 April 2000	Cardiff City	H	0–0	13,794	
15 April 2000	Bristol Rovers	A	2–0	10,111	Macken, Gunnlaugsson
22 April 2000	Scunthorpe United	H	1–0	15,518	Angell
24 April 2000	Cambridge United	A	0–2	6,068	
29 April 2000	Millwall	H	3–2	19,407	Eyres, Jackson, Angell
6 May 2000	Bristol City	A	2–0	11,160	Angell, Appleton

=== FA Cup ===
Round	Date	Opponent	Venue	Result	Attendance	Goalscorers
R1	31 October 1999	Bristol Rovers	A	1–0	6,145	McKenna
R2	20 November 1999	Enfield	H	0–0	11,566	
R2R	30 November 1999	Enfield	A	3–0	1,808	Eyres, Alexander (pen), Gunnlaugsson
R3	11 December 1999	Oldham Athletic	H	2–1	9,940	Macken, Alexander (pen)
R4	8 January 2000	Plymouth Argyle	A	3–0	10,824	O'Sullivan (own goal), Alexander (pen), Beswetherick (own goal)
R5	29 January 2000	Everton	A	0–2	37,486	

=== League Cup ===
Round	Date	Opponent	Venue	Result	Attendance	Goalscorers
R1 1st Leg	10 August 1999	Wrexham	H	1–0	4,930	Appleton
R1 2nd Leg	24 August 1999	Wrexham	A	2–0 (won 3-0 on agg)	2,911	Basham, Macken
R2 1st Leg	14 September 1999	Sheffield United	A	0–2	5,350	
R2 2nd Leg	21 September 1999	Sheffield United	H	3–0 (won 3-2 on agg)	5,658	Alexander, Mathie (2)
R3	12 October 1999	Arsenal	A	1–2	15,239	Macken

=== Football League Trophy ===
Round	Date	Opponent	Venue	Result	Attendance	Goalscorers
R1N	7 December 1999	Wrexham	H	4–1	3,306	Gunnlaugsson (3), Edwards
R2N	10 January 2000	Hartlepool United	H	1–2	3,635	Gunnlaugsson

== Statistics ==
=== Appearances and goals ===
No.	Pos	Nat	Player	Total		Division Two		FA Cup		EFL Cup		EFL Trophy	
No.	Pos	Nat	Player	Apps	Goals	Apps	Goals	Apps	Goals	Apps	Goals	Apps	Goals
1	GK	(England) ENG	David Lucas	9	0	6	0	1	0	1	0	1	0
2	DF	(Scotland) SCO	Graham Alexander	58	10	46	6	6	3	5	1	1	0
3	DF	(England) ENG	Dominic Ludden	5	0	3	0	0	0	1	0	1	0
4	DF	(England) ENG	Ryan Kidd	38	0	28+1	0	3	0	3+1	0	2	0
5	DF	(England) ENG	Michael Jackson	57	5	46	5	6	0	5	0	0	0
6	DF	(England) ENG	Sean Gregan	43	3	33	3	6	0	4	0	0	0
7	MF	(England) ENG	Lee Cartwright	37	1	22+8	1	2+1	0	3	0	0+1	0
8	MF	(England) ENG	Mark Rankine	53	0	44	0	5	0	4	0	0	0
10	FW	(England) ENG	Steve Basham	27	1	11+13	0	0+1	0	1+1	1	0	0
11	MF	(England) ENG	David Eyres	49	8	26+15	7	5	1	1+2	0	0	0
12	DF	(England) ENG	Gary Parkinson	1	0	0+1	0	0	0	0	0	0	0
13	DF	(Scotland) SCO	David Moyes	0	0	0	0	0	0	0	0	0	0
14	DF	(Northern Ireland) NIR	Colin Murdock	41	2	29+4	2	3+1	0	3	0	1	0
15	DF	(Wales) WAL	Rob Edwards	54	3	37+4	2	6	0	5	0	2	1
16	MF	(England) ENG	Paul McKenna	32	3	17+7	2	1+1	1	5	0	0+1	0
17	FW	(Republic of Ireland) IRL	Jon Macken	57	25	40+4	22	5+1	1	5	2	2	0
18	MF	(England) ENG	Michael Appleton	33	4	21+5	3	3	0	2	1	2	0
19	FW	(Iceland) ISL	Bjarki Gunnlaugsson	35	5	12+14	1	3+3	0	0+1	0	2	4
20	MF	(Northern Ireland) NIR	Paul Morgan	0	0	0	0	0	0	0	0	0	0
21	GK	(Finland) FIN	Tepi Moilanen	51	0	40+1	0	5	0	4	0	1	0
22	DF	(England) ENG	Adam Eaton	1	0	0	0	0	0	0	0	0+1	0
23	FW	(Northern Ireland) NIR	Mark Wright	2	0	0+2	0	0	0	0	0	0	0
24	MF	(France) FRA	Farid Diaf	6	0	1+2	0	0+1	0	0	0	2	0
25	MF	(England) ENG	Julian Darby	7	0	2+1	0	2	0	0	0	2	0
26	MF	(Republic of Ireland) IRL	Stuart King	1	0	0	0	0	0	0	0	0+1	0
27	FW	(England) ENG	Mark Beesley	2	0	0+1	0	0	0	0	0	0+1	0
28	MF	(Republic of Ireland) IRL	Brian Barry-Murphy	3	0	0+1	0	0	0	0+1	0	1	0
30	GK	(Republic of Ireland) IRL	Kelham O'Hanlon	0	0	0	0	0	0	0	0	0	0
31	MF	(Scotland) SCO	Iain Anderson	12	2	11+1	2	0	0	0	0	0	0
Player(s) who featured whilst on loan but returned to parent club during the season:
31	FW	(Wales) WAL	Alex Mathie	18	4	5+7	2	1+2	0	2	2	1	0
32	MF	(England) ENG	David Beresford	6	0	1+3	0	0+1	0	0	0	1	0
32	FW	(England) ENG	Brett Angell	15	8	9+6	8	0	0	0	0	0	0
Player who left during the season:
9	FW	(Wales) WAL	Kurt Nogan	31	4	16+6	4	3+2	0	1+2	0	0+1	0

== Awards and Nominations ==
=== Club Awards ===
Award	Player	Notes	Ref.
Player of the Year	(England) Sean Gregan		
