= 2000–01 Preston North End F.C. season =

English football club season

Preston North End
2000–01 season
- Chairman: Bryan Gray
- Manager: David Moyes
- Stadium: Deepdale
- Division One: 4th (qualified for play-offs)
- Play-offs: Runners-up
- FA Cup: Third round
- Worthington Cup: Second round
- Top goalscorer: League: Macken (19); All: Macken (22)
- Highest home attendance: 17,335 vs Burnley
- Lowest home attendance: 12,632 vs Crewe Alexandra
- Average home league attendance: 14,617

During the 2000–01 English football season, Preston North End F.C. competed in the Football League First Division, the second tier of English football.

== Season summary ==
After being promoted to the First Division, Preston North End occupied the play-offs spots for most of the season and eventually finished fourth to qualify for the play-offs for promotion to the Premiership. After beating Birmingham City 4–2 on penalties after a 2–2 draw on aggregate over two legs North End faced Lancashire rivals Bolton Wanderers at the Millennium Stadium. Bolton took a 17th-minute lead through Gareth Farrelly, and, despite Preston fighting for an equaliser, goals from Michael Ricketts and Ricardo Gardner in the 89th and 90th minutes ended Preston's hopes of a second successive promotion and a return to the top flight after an absence of over 40 years.

== Final league table ==
Pos	Team	Pld	W	D	L	GF	GA	GD	Pts	Qualification or relegation
2	Blackburn Rovers (P)	46	26	13	7	76	39	+37	91	Promotion to the Premier League
3	Bolton Wanderers (O, P)	46	24	15	7	76	45	+31	87	Qualification for the First Division play-offs
4	Preston North End	46	23	9	14	64	52	+12	78	Qualification for the First Division play-offs
5	Birmingham City	46	23	9	14	59	48	+11	78	Qualification for the First Division play-offs
6	West Bromwich Albion	46	21	11	14	60	52	+8	74	Qualification for the First Division play-offs

Rules for classification: 1) Points; 2) Goal difference; 3) Goals scored
(O) Play-off winners; (P) Promoted

== Results ==
Preston North End's score comes first

=== Legend ===
Win	Draw	Loss

=== Football League First Division ===
Date	Opponent	Venue	Result	Attendance	Scorers
12 August 2000	Grimsby Town	A	2-1	5,755	Appleton, Macken
19 August 2000	Sheffield United	H	3-0	13,948	Appleton, Macken 2
26 August 2000	Bolton Wanderers	A	0-2	19,954	
28 August 2000	Wimbledon	H	1-1	13,519	Appleton
02 September 2000	Portsmouth	H	1-0	13,343	Basham
09 September 2000	Queens Park Rangers	A	0-0	11,092	
12 September 2000	Birmingham City	A	1-3	16,464	Rankine
16 September 2000	Stockport County	H	1-1	12,735	McKenna
23 September 2000	Sheffield Wednesday	A	3-1	17,379	Alexander, Anderson, Walker (og)
30 September 2000	Crystal Palace	H	2-0	13,028	Macken, McKenna
14 October 2000	Tranmere Rovers	H	1-0	14,511	Basham
17 October 2000	Norwich City	H	1-0	13,002	Bjarki Gunnlaugsson
21 October 2000	Huddersfield Town	A	0-0	13,161	
24 October 2000	Fulham	A	1-0	14,354	Appleton
27 October 2000	Barnsley	H	1-2	13,566	Macken
04 November 2000	Nottingham Forest	A	1-3	19,504	Macken
10 November 2000	Crewe Alexandra	H	2-1	12,632	Appleton, Rankine
18 November 2000	Watford	A	3-2	13,066	Macken, Rankine, Anderson
25 November 2000	West Bromwich Albion	A	1-3	20,043	Anderson
02 December 2000	Fulham	H	1-1	16,047	Jackson
09 December 2000	Burnley	H	2-1	17,355	Macken, Alexander
16 December 2000	Gillingham	A	0-4	8,198	
23 December 2000	Grimsby Town	H	1-2	14,667	Macken
26 December 2000	Wolverhampton Wanderers	A	1-0	24,306	Anderson
30 December 2000	Sheffield United	A	2-3	22,316	Healy, Rankine
01 January 2001	Bolton Wanderers	H	0-2	15,863	
10 January 2001	Blackburn Rovers	A	2-3	23,983	Macken, Healy
13 January 2001	Wimbledon	A	1-3	7,242	Robinson
03 February 2001	Portsmouth	A	1-0	13,331	Healy
10 February 2001	Queens Park Rangers	H	5-0	14,423	Macken 2, Brian McBride, Healy, Anderson
13 February 2001	Stockport County	A	1-0	7,590	Healy
20 February 2001	Birmingham City	H	0-2	14,864	
24 February 2001	Sheffield Wednesday	H	2-0	14,379	McKenna, Macken
03 March 2001	Crystal Palace	A	2-0	15,160	Healy, Alexander
06 March 2001	Tranmere Rovers	A	1-1	10,335	Macken
14 March 2001	Wolverhampton Wanderers	H	2-0	15,457	McKenna, Cresswell
17 March 2001	Norwich City	A	2-1	16,282	Healy, Gregan
31 March 2001	Gillingham	H	0-0	13,550	
06 April 2001	Burnley	A	0-3	16,591	
10 April 2001	Huddersfield Town	H	0-0	15,185	
14 April 2001	Nottingham Forest	H	1-1	16,842	Healy
16 April 2001	Barnsley	A	4-0	16,361	Macken, Anderson, McKenna, Cresswell
22 April 2001	Watford	H	3-2	14,071	Alexander, Macken 2
28 April 2001	Crewe Alexandra	A	3-1	9,451	Healy, Macken 2
02 May 2001	Blackburn Rovers	H	0-1	16,975	
06 May 2001	West Bromwich Albion	H	2-1	16,226	Gregan, Alexander

=== Football League Playoffs ===
Round	Date	Opponent	Venue	Result	Attendance	Scorers
SF-1	13.05.2001	Birmingham City	A	0-1		
SF-2	17.05.2001	Birmingham City	H	2-1 (Preston win on penalties)		David Healy, Mark Rankine
FN	28.05.2001	Bolton Wanderers	Neutral	0-3		

=== FA Cup ===
Round	Date	Opponent	Venue	Result	Attendance	Goalscorers
R3	06 January 2001	Stockport County	H	0-1	9,975	

=== League Cup ===
Round	Date	Opponent	Venue	Result	Attendance	Goalscorers
R1-1	22 August 2000	Shrewsbury Town	A	0-1	2,445	
R1-2	05 September 2000	Shrewsbury Town	H	4-1	5,451	Macken 3, Alexander
R2-1	19 September 2000	Coventry City	H	1-3	10,770	Alexander
R2-2	27 September 2000	Coventry City	A	1-4	7,425	Mark Rankine

== Squad statistics ==
No.	Pos	Nat	Player	Total		Football League First Division		FA Cup		League Cup	
No.	Pos	Nat	Player	Apps	Goals	Apps	Goals	Apps	Goals	Apps	Goals
1	GK	(England) ENG	David Lucas	33	0	28+1	0	1	0	3	0
2	DF	(Scotland) SCO	Graham Alexander	38	7	34	5	0	0	4	2
3	DF	(England) ENG	Dominic Ludden	2	0	2	0	0	0	0	0
4	DF	(England) ENG	Ryan Kidd	17	0	13+2	0	1	0	0+1	0
5	DF	(England) ENG	Michael Jackson	33	1	27+3	1	1	0	2	0
6	DF	(England) ENG	Sean Gregan	45	2	39+2	2	0	0	4	0
7	MF	(England) ENG	Lee Cartwright	42	0	29+9	0	0+1	0	3	0
8	MF	(England) ENG	Mark Rankine	48	5	43+1	4	1	0	2+1	1
9	FW	(United States) USA	Brian McBride (on loan from Columbus Crew)	11	1	8+1	1	1	0	1	0
10	FW	(England) ENG	Steve Basham	17	2	11+2	2	0	0	4	0
11	FW	(Northern Ireland) NIR	David Healy	23	9	19+3	9	1	0	0	0
12	DF	(Scotland) SCO	Derek Collins (on loan from Hibernian)	0	0	0	0	0	0	0	0
14	DF	(Northern Ireland) NIR	Colin Murdock	41	0	33+4	0	0	0	4	0
15	DF	(Wales) WAL	Rob Edwards	46	0	41+1	0	0	0	4	0
16	MF	(England) ENG	Paul McKenna	47	5	43+1	5	1	0	2	0
17	FW	(Republic of Ireland) IRL	Jon Macken	41	22	37+1	19	0+1	0	2	3
19	FW	(Iceland) ISL	Bjarki Gunnlaugsson	19	1	5+14	1	0	0	0	0
20	MF	(Northern Ireland) NIR	Paul Morgan	1	0	0	0	0	0	1	0
21	GK	(Finland) FIN	Tepi Moilanen	17	0	17	0	0	0	0	0
22	DF	(England) ENG	Adam Eaton	2	0	1	0	1	0	0	0
23	FW	(Northern Ireland) NIR	Mark Wright	0	0	0	0	0	0	0	0
24	MF	(Northern Ireland) NIR	Steve Robinson	25	1	6+16	1	0	0	3	0
25	FW	(England) ENG	Richard Cresswell	11	2	5+6	2	0	0	0	0
28	MF	(Republic of Ireland) IRL	Brian Barry-Murphy	18	0	2+12	0	1	0	1+2	0
29	FW	(England) ENG	Joe O'Neill	0	0	0	0	0	0	0	0
30	GK	(Republic of Ireland) IRL	Kelham O'Hanlon	1	0	0+1	0	0	0	0	0
31	MF	(Scotland) SCO	Iain Anderson	33	6	19+12	6	0	0	2	0
32	DF	(Scotland) SCO	David Moyes (player-manager)	0	0	0	0	0	0	0	0
33	MF	(England) ENG	John Bailey	0	0	0	0	0	0	0	0
38	MF	(Republic of Ireland) IRL	Michael Keane	2	0	0+2	0	0	0	0	0
44	GK	(England) ENG	Andy Lonergan	2	0	1	0	0	0	1	0
Out on Loan:
26	MF	(Republic of Ireland) IRL	Stuart King	0	0	0	0	0	0	0	0
Player who left during the season:
11	MF	(England) ENG	David Eyres	7	0	5	0	0	0	0+2	0
12	DF	(England) ENG	Gary Parkinson	12	0	11	0	1	0	0	0
18	MF	(England) ENG	Michael Appleton	28	5	25+1	5	1	0	1	0
25	FW	(Netherlands) NED	Erik Meijer (on loan from Liverpool)	9	0	9	0	0	0	0	0
