= 1991–92 Southend United F.C. season =

Southend United
1991–92 season
- Chairman: Vic Jobson
- Manager: David Webb
- Stadium: Roots Hall
- Second Division: 12th
- FA Cup: Third round
- League Cup: First round
- Full Members Cup: Second round
- Top goalscorer: League: Angell (21); All: Angell (23)
- Average home league attendance: 6,733

During the 1991–92 English football season, Southend United F.C. competed in the Football League Second Division.

== Season summary ==
In the 1991–92 season, Southend finished 12th in the old Second Division, their highest ever position in the Football League to date. On New Year's Day 1992, Southend briefly topped the Second Division but their dreary late season form stopped any hopes of a unique third successive promotion that would have given them a place as a Premier League founder member. Manager David Webb then stepped down.

== Final league table ==
Pos	Team	Pld	W	D	L	GF	GA	GD	Pts	Qualification or relegation
10	Watford	46	18	11	17	51	48	+3	65	Qualification for the First Division (Note: From the 1992–93 season, the first tier became the Premier League, the second tier - then known as the Second Division - was renamed to the First Division, and the third tier - then known as the Third Division - was renamed to the Second Division.)
11	Wolverhampton Wanderers	46	18	10	18	61	54	+7	64	Qualification for the First Division
12	Southend United	46	17	11	18	63	63	0	62	Qualification for the First Division
13	Bristol Rovers	46	16	14	16	60	63	−3	62	Qualification for the First Division
14	Tranmere Rovers	46	14	19	13	56	56	0	61	Qualification for the First Division

Rules for classification: 1) Points; 2) Goal difference; 3) Goals scored

== Results ==
Southend United's score comes first

=== Legend ===
Win	Draw	Loss

=== Football League Second Division ===
Date	Opponent	Venue	Result	Attendance	Scorers
17 August 1991	Bristol City	H	1–1	6,720	Benjamin
24 August 1991	Derby County	A	2–1	12,284	Sussex, Angell
31 August 1991	Leicester City	H	1–2	6,944	Martin
3 September 1991	Cambridge United	A	1–0	6,413	Benjamin
7 September 1991	Ipswich Town	A	0–1	12,732	
14 September 1991	Bristol Rovers	H	2–0	4,670	Ansah, Angell
17 September 1991	Plymouth Argyle	H	2–1	4,585	Angell, Benjamin
21 September 1991	Port Vale	A	0–0	5,988	
28 September 1991	Wolverhampton Wanderers	H	0–2	8,368	
4 October 1991	Tranmere Rovers	A	1–1	7,358	Angell
12 October 1991	Millwall	H	2–3	7,266	Sussex, Tilson
19 October 1991	Watford	A	2–1	6,862	Sussex, Dublin (own goal)
26 October 1991	Charlton Athletic	H	1–1	7,320	Austin (pen)
30 October 1991	Oxford United	H	2–3	4,873	Angell, Tilson
2 November 1991	Middlesbrough	A	1–1	9,664	Angell
5 November 1991	Blackburn Rovers	H	3–0	4,860	Angell (2), Benjamin
9 November 1991	Swindon Town	H	3–2	7,709	Angell (2), Tilson
20 November 1991	Newcastle United	A	2–3	14,740	Angell, Tilson
23 November 1991	Barnsley	H	2–1	5,060	Angell, Tilson
30 November 1991	Sunderland	A	2–1	13,575	Angell, Scully
7 December 1991	Brighton & Hove Albion	H	2–1	6,303	Ansah, Tilson
14 December 1991	Portsmouth	A	1–1	9,006	Scully
22 December 1991	Cambridge United	H	1–1	9,353	Benjamin
26 December 1991	Oxford United	A	1–0	5,601	Angell
28 December 1991	Leicester City	A	0–2	15,635	
1 January 1992	Newcastle United	H	4–0	9,458	Angell (2), Jones, Ansah
11 January 1992	Derby County	H	1–0	8,295	Ansah
18 January 1992	Bristol City	A	2–2	9,883	Angell, Ansah
1 February 1992	Watford	H	1–0	7,581	Benjamin
8 February 1992	Charlton Athletic	A	0–2	9,724	
15 February 1992	Barnsley	A	0–1	5,328	
18 February 1992	Grimsby Town	A	2–3	5,337	Austin, Ansah
22 February 1992	Sunderland	H	2–0	7,473	Angell, Jones
29 February 1992	Brighton & Hove Albion	A	2–3	8,271	Benjamin, Angell
10 March 1992	Blackburn Rovers	A	2–2	14,404	Ansah, Angell
14 March 1992	Middlesbrough	H	0–1	7,272	
17 March 1992	Portsmouth	H	2–3	6,832	Tilson, Jones
21 March 1992	Swindon Town	A	1–3	8,628	Ansah
28 March 1992	Grimsby Town	H	3–1	4,591	Angell, Scully, Ansah
1 April 1992	Bristol Rovers	A	1–0	5,375	Jones
4 April 1992	Ipswich Town	H	1–2	10,003	Prior
11 April 1992	Plymouth Argyle	A	2–0	7,060	Marker (own goal), Benjamin
15 April 1992	Port Vale	H	0–0	4,462	
20 April 1992	Wolverhampton Wanderers	A	1–3	10,953	Benjamin
25 April 1992	Tranmere Rovers	H	1–1	4,761	Jones
2 May 1992	Millwall	A	0–2	7,574	

=== FA Cup ===
Round	Date	Opponent	Venue	Result	Attendance	Goalscorers
R3	4 January 1992	Everton	A	0–1	22,605	

=== League Cup ===
Round	Date	Opponent	Venue	Result	Attendance	Goalscorers
R1 1st Leg	20 August 1991	Watford	A	0–2	6,231	
R1 2nd Leg	28 August 1991	Watford	H	1–1 (lost 1–3 on agg)	3,802	Angell

=== Full Members Cup ===
Round	Date	Opponent	Venue	Result	Attendance	Goalscorers
SR1	2 October 1991	Watford	A	1–0	1,700	Sussex
SR2	22 October 1991	Crystal Palace	A	2–4	7,185	Jones, Angell

== Squad ==
Note: Flags indicate national team as defined under FIFA eligibility rules; some limited exceptions apply. Players may hold more than one non-FIFA nationality.

Pos.	Nation	Player
GK	ENG	Simon Royce
GK	ENG	Paul Sansome
DF	ENG	Dean Austin
DF	ENG	Andy Edwards
DF	ENG	Mark Hall
DF	ENG	Christian Hyslop
DF	ENG	Adam Locke
DF	ENG	Chris Powell
DF	ENG	Spencer Prior
DF	IRL	Pat Scully
DF	ENG	Andy Sussex

Pos.	Nation	Player
MF	ENG	Andy Ansah
MF	ENG	Peter Butler
MF	ENG	John Cornwell
MF	ENG	Keith Jones
MF	ENG	Dave Martin
MF	IRL	Kevin O'Callaghan
MF	ENG	Paul Smith
MF	ENG	Steve Tilson
FW	ENG	Brett Angell
FW	ENG	Ian Benjamin
