= 1995–96 Brentford F.C. season =

English football team season

Brentford
1995–96 season
- Chairman: Martin Lange
- Manager: David Webb
- Stadium: Griffin Park
- Second Division: 15th
- FA Cup: Fourth round
- League Cup: Second round
- Football League Trophy: First round
- Top goalscorer: League: Taylor (11); All: Taylor (16)
- Highest home attendance: 7,878
- Lowest home attendance: 3,104
- Average home league attendance: 4,768
Home colours	Away colours

During the 1995–96 English football season, Brentford competed in the Football League Second Division. After spending over two mid-season months in the relegation places, the club achieved a 15th-place finish. A bright spot was a run to the fourth round of the FA Cup, falling to First Division high-flyers Charlton Athletic.

== Season summary ==
Brentford began the 1995–96 season with the majority of the squad that finished runners-up in the previous season still intact, with Shane Westley, Simon Ratcliffe and Paul Stephenson the only players to depart. Manager David Webb's only addition to the squad during the off-season was Southend United's teenage left-sided midfielder and full back Ijah Anderson. 1994–95 top scorer Nicky Forster looked set to depart for First Division club Crystal Palace for a £2,000,000 fee, but the Eagles' interest cooled after multiple rejections by Brentford.

A win and a draw from the opening two games of the league season put Brentford in its highest league position of the season (6th), but a run of only four wins from the following 21 games left the club second-from-bottom at the mid-point of the season. With Nicky Forster damaging knee ligaments in October 1995 and his subsequent goalscoring form faltering amid "distracting" transfer speculation, Robert Taylor was burdened with leading the team's strikeforce. Taylor ended the season as the club's top scorer, with 16 goals.

A memorable 2–1 victory over First Division club Norwich City at Carrow Road on in the FA Cup third round on 6 January 1996 provided the spark needed for a revival of the team's league form, with 19 of a possible 30 points being won between mid-January and mid-March to climb to 13th in the table. Four wins from the final seven matches of the season led Brentford to a 15th-place finish in the Second Division. The FA Cup run ended with a 3–2 defeat at the hands of high-flying First Division club Charlton Athletic in the fourth round.

== League table ==
Pos	Team	Pld	W	D	L	GF	GA	GD	Pts
13	Bristol City	46	15	15	16	55	60	−5	60
14	Bournemouth	46	16	10	20	51	70	−19	58
15	Brentford	46	15	13	18	43	49	−6	58
16	Rotherham United	46	14	14	18	54	62	−8	56
17	Burnley	46	14	13	19	56	68	−12	55

== Results ==
Brentford's goal tally listed first.

=== Legend ===
Win	Draw	Loss

=== Pre-season and friendlies ===
Date	Opponent	Venue	Result	Scorer(s)
19 July 1995	Hampton	A	7–0	Forster (3), Ashby (2), Statham, Grainger (pen)
20 July 1995	Basingstoke Town	A	1–1	Ravenscroft
22 July 1995	St Albans City	A	5–1	Grainger (2, 1 pen), Taylor, Forster, Stephenson
24 July 1995	Hitchin Town	A	3–1	Omigie (2), Annon
26 July 1995	Kingstonian	A	2–1	Forster, Grainger
28 July 1995	Colchester United	A	1–1	Taylor
1 August 1995	Barnet	A	2–3	Abrahams, Forster
5 August 1995	Yeading	A	5–2	Ravenscroft (2), Annon, Hooker, Omigie
7 August 1995	Walton & Hersham	A	4–0	Forster, Smith, Taylor, Grainger (pen)
30 August 1995	Harrow Borough	A	5–0	Annon (2, 1 pen), Hutchings, Hooker, Omigie

=== Football League Second Division ===
No.	Date	Opponent	Venue	Result	Attendance	Scorer(s)
1	12 August 1995	York City	A	2–2	3,239	Smith, Forster
2	19 August 1995	Oxford United	H	1–0	5,516	Taylor
3	26 August 1995	Burnley	A	0–1	9,586	
4	29 August 1995	Hull City	H	1–0	4,535	Taylor
5	2 September 1995	Swindon Town	H	0–2	7,878	
6	9 September 1995	Rotherham United	A	0–1	3,061	
7	12 September 1995	Bristol City	A	0–0	5,054	
8	16 September 1995	Walsall	H	1–0	4,717	Taylor
9	23 September 1995	Bristol Rovers	A	0–2	5,131	
10	30 September 1995	Chesterfield	H	1–2	4,734	McGhee
11	7 October 1995	Blackpool	H	1–2	5,313	McGhee
12	14 October 1995	Stockport County	A	1–1	6,228	Smith
13	21 October 1995	Peterborough United	H	3–0	4,865	Bates (2), Grainger (pen)
14	28 October 1995	Crewe Alexandra	A	1–3	3,835	Forster
15	1 November 1995	Notts County	A	0–4	4,005	
16	4 November 1995	Shrewsbury Town	H	0–2	4,104	
17	18 November 1995	Bournemouth	A	0–1	3,894	
18	25 November 1995	Bradford City	H	2–1	4,237	Taylor (2)
19	9 December 1995	Bristol Rovers	H	0–0	5,679	
20	16 December 1996	Chesterfield	A	2–2	4,016	Smith, Ansah
21	22 December 1996	Wrexham	A	2–2	3,670	Taylor, Martin
22	26 December 1995	Brighton & Hove Albion	H	0–1	5,794	
23	13 January 1996	Oxford United	A	1–2	5,574	Ashby
24	20 January 1996	York City	H	2–0	3,915	Bates, Taylor
25	30 January 1996	Wycombe Wanderers	H	1–0	4,616	Taylor
26	3 February 1996	Burnley	H	1–0	5,195	Forster
27	10 February 1996	Carlisle United	A	1–2	5,143	Bates
28	17 February 1996	Bristol City	H	2–2	5,213	McGhee, Taylor
29	21 February 1996	Swindon Town	A	2–2	8,814	Abrahams (2)
30	24 February 1996	Walsall	A	1–0	3,506	Abrahams
31	27 February 1996	Rotherham United	H	1–1	3,446	Grainger
32	2 March 1996	Brighton & Hove Albion	A	0–0	5,914	
33	5 March 1996	Hull City	A	1–0	2,284	Anderson
34	9 March 1996	Wrexham	H	1–0	4,579	Anderson
35	12 March 1996	Swansea City	A	1–2	3,538	Forster
36	16 March 1996	Wycombe Wanderers	A	1–2	4,912	Forster
37	19 March 1996	Carlisle United	H	1–1	3,104	Grainger
38	23 March 1996	Swansea City	H	0–0	4,378	
39	30 March 1996	Blackpool	A	0–1	5,899	
40	2 April 1996	Stockport County	H	1–0	3,274	Smith
41	6 April 1996	Crewe Alexandra	H	2–1	4,408	Taylor (2)
42	8 April 1996	Peterborough United	A	1–0	4,343	McGhee
43	13 April 1996	Notts County	H	0–0	4,588	
44	20 April 1996	Shrewsbury Town	A	1–2	2,711	McGhee
45	27 April 1996	Bradford City	A	1–2	7,730	Bent
46	4 May 1996	Bournemouth	H	2–0	6,091	Asaba (2)

=== FA Cup ===
Round	Date	Opponent	Venue	Result	Attendance	Scorer(s)
R1	11 November 1995	Farnborough Town	H	1–1	4,711	Bent
R1 (replay)	22 November 1995	Farnborough Town	A	4–0	3,581	Smith, Taylor (2), Bent
R2	2 December 1995	Bournemouth	A	1–0	4,451	Taylor
R3	6 January 1996	Norwich City	A	2–1	10,082	Newsome (og), Bent
R4	7 February 1996	Charlton Athletic	A	2–3	15,000	Ashby, Smith

=== League Cup ===
Round	Date	Opponent	Venue	Result	Attendance	Scorer(s)
R1 (1st leg)	15 August 1995	Walsall	A	2–2	2,405	Harvey, Forster
R1 (2nd leg)	22 August 1995	Walsall	H	3–2 (won 5–4 on aggregate)	3,549	Taylor, Anderson, McGhee
R2 (1st leg)	19 September 1995	Bolton Wanderers	A	0–1	5,243	
R2 (2nd leg)	3 October 1995	Bolton Wanderers	H	2–3 (lost 4–2 on aggregate)	4,861	Forster, Grainger (pen)

=== Football League Trophy ===
Round	Date	Opponent	Venue	Result	Attendance	Scorer(s)
SR1 (match 1)	27 September 1995	Bournemouth	A	1–0	1,092	Taylor
SR1 (match 2)	17 October 1995	Exeter City	H	1–1	1,431	Forster

- Source: Statto, The Big Brentford Book Of The Nineties

== Playing squad ==
Players' ages are as of the opening day of the 1995–96 season.

Position	Name	Nationality	Date of birth (age)	Signed from	Signed in	Notes
Goalkeepers
GK	Kevin Dearden	(England)	8 March 1970 (aged 25)	Tottenham Hotspur	1993	
GK	Tamer Fernandes	(England)	7 December 1974 (aged 20)	Youth	1993	
Defenders
DF	Ijah Anderson	(England)	30 December 1975 (aged 19)	Southend United	1995	
DF	Barry Ashby	(England)	21 November 1970 (aged 24)	Watford	1994	
DF	Jamie Bates (c)	(England)	24 February 1968 (aged 27)	Youth	1986	
DF	Paul Davis	(England)	9 December 1961 (aged 33)	Arsenal	1995	
DF	Lee Harvey	(England)	21 December 1966 (aged 28)	Nottingham Forest	1993	
DF	Carl Hutchings	(England)	24 September 1974 (aged 20)	Youth	1993	
DF	Brian Statham	(England)	21 May 1969 (aged 26)	Tottenham Hotspur	1992	
Midfielders
MF	Paul Abrahams	(England)	31 October 1973 (aged 21)	Colchester United	1995	Loaned to Colchester United
MF	Jon Hooker	(England)	31 March 1972 (aged 23)	Gillingham	1994	Loaned to Bishop's Stortford
MF	Gus Hurdle	(Barbados)	14 October 1973 (aged 21)	Carshalton Athletic	1993	
MF	Dean Martin	(England)	31 August 1972 (aged 22)	KA	1995	
MF	David McGhee	(England)	19 June 1976 (aged 19)	Youth	1994	
MF	Craig Ravenscroft	(England)	20 December 1974 (aged 20)	Youth	1993	
MF	Paul Smith	(England)	18 September 1971 (aged 23)	Southend United	1993	
Forwards
FW	Carl Asaba	(England)	28 January 1973 (aged 22)	Dulwich Hamlet	1994	
FW	Marcus Bent	(England)	19 May 1978 (aged 17)	Youth	1995	
FW	Nicky Forster	(England)	8 September 1973 (aged 21)	Gillingham	1994	
FW	Joe Omigie	(England)	13 June 1972 (aged 23)	Donna	1994	Loaned to Woking
FW	Robert Taylor	(England)	30 April 1971 (aged 24)	Leyton Orient	1994	
Players who left the club mid-season
DF	Martin Grainger	(England)	23 August 1972 (aged 22)	Colchester United	1993	Transferred to Birmingham City
MF	Darren Annon	(England)	17 February 1972 (aged 23)	Carshalton Athletic	1994	Released
MF	Andy Ansah	(England)	19 March 1969 (aged 26)	Southend United	1995	Returned to Southend United after loan
MF	Scott Canham	(England)	11 November 1974 (aged 20)	West Ham United	1996	Returned to West Ham United after loan
MF	David Greene	(Republic of Ireland)	26 October 1973 (aged 21)	Luton Town	1996	Returned to Luton Town after loan
MF	Denny Mundee	(England)	10 October 1968 (aged 26)	Bournemouth	1993	Released
FW	Andy Sussex	(England)	23 November 1964 (aged 30)	Southend United	1995	Returned to Southend United after loan

- Source: The Big Brentford Book Of The Nineties

== Coaching staff ==
Name	Role
(England) David Webb	Manager
(England) Kevin Lock	First Team Coach
(England) Graham Benstead	Goalkeeping Coach
(England) Roy Johnson	Physiotherapist
(England) Fergus Dignan	Medical Officer

== Statistics ==
=== Appearances and goals ===
Substitute appearances in brackets.

Pos	Nat	Name	League		FA Cup		League Cup		FL Trophy		Total	
Pos	Nat	Name	Apps	Goals	Apps	Goals	Apps	Goals	Apps	Goals	Apps	Goals
GK	(England)	Kevin Dearden	41	0	3	0	3	0	1	0	48	0
GK	(England)	Tamer Fernandes	5	0	2	0	0	0	1	0	7	0
DF	(England)	Ijah Anderson	25	2	1 (2)	0	2	1	0 (1)	0	28 (3)	3
DF	(England)	Barry Ashby	31 (2)	1	4	1	4	0	2	0	41 (2)	2
DF	(England)	Jamie Bates	36	4	5	0	4	0	2	0	47	4
DF	(England)	Paul Davis	5	0	0	0	2	0	1	0	8	0
DF	(England)	Martin Grainger	33	3	5	0	4	1	2	0	44	4
DF	(England)	Lee Harvey	38 (2)	0	4 (1)	0	2 (1)	1	1	0	45 (4)	1
DF	(England)	Carl Hutchings	20 (3)	0	5	0	0	0	0 (1)	0	25 (4)	0
DF	(England)	Brian Statham	17	0	1	0	4	0	2	0	24	0
MF	(England)	Paul Abrahams	14 (3)	3	0	0	0	0	0	0	14 (3)	3
MF	(England)	Darren Annon	0 (1)	0	0	0	0	0	0	0	0 (1)	0
MF	(England)	Marcus Bent	8 (4)	1	4	3	0	0	0	0	12 (4)	4
MF	(England)	Jon Hooker	4	0	0 (2)	0	1	0	0	0	5 (2)	0
MF	(Barbados)	Gus Hurdle	11 (3)	0	0	0	2	0	0	0	13 (3)	0
MF	(England)	Dean Martin	14 (5)	1	4 (1)	0	—		1	0	18 (6)	1
MF	(England)	David McGhee	31 (5)	5	4	0	2 (1)	1	1 (1)	0	38 (7)	6
MF	(England)	Denny Mundee	5 (1)	0	—		1 (1)	0	0	0	6 (2)	0
MF	(England)	Craig Ravenscroft	1	0	0	0	0	0	0	0	1	0
MF	(England)	Paul Smith	46	4	5	2	4	0	2	0	57	6
FW	(England)	Carl Asaba	5 (5)	2	1	0	1	0	1	0	8 (5)	2
FW	(England)	Nicky Forster	37 (1)	5	3	0	4	2	2	1	46 (1)	8
FW	(England)	Joe Omigie	3 (8)	0	0	0	0	0	0	0	3 (8)	0
FW	(England)	Robert Taylor	42	11	4	3	4	1	2	1	52	16
Players loaned in during the season
MF	(England)	Andy Ansah	6	1	—		—		—		6	1
MF	(England)	Scott Canham	14	0	—		—		—		14	0
MF	(Republic of Ireland)	David Greene	11	0	—		—		—		11	0
FW	(England)	Andy Sussex	3	0	—		—		—		3	0

- Players listed in italics left the club mid-season.
- Source: The Big Brentford Book Of The Nineties

=== Goalscorers ===
Pos.	Nat	Player	FL2	FAC	FLC	FLT	Total
FW	(England)	Robert Taylor	11	3	1	1	16
FW	(England)	Nicky Forster	5	0	2	1	8
MF	(England)	David McGhee	5	0	1	0	6
MF	(England)	Paul Smith	4	2	0	0	6
DF	(England)	Jamie Bates	4	0	0	0	4
DF	(England)	Martin Grainger	3	0	1	0	4
MF	(England)	Marcus Bent	1	3	0	0	4
MF	(England)	Paul Abrahams	3	0	0	0	3
DF	(England)	Ijah Anderson	2	0	1	0	3
FW	(England)	Carl Asaba	2	0	0	1	2
DF	(England)	Barry Ashby	1	1	0	0	2
FW	(England)	Andy Ansah	1	—	—	—	1
FW	(England)	Dean Martin	1	0	—	0	1
MF	(England)	Lee Harvey	0	0	1	0	1
Opponents			0	1	0	0	1
Total			43	11	7	2	63

- Players listed in italics left the club mid-season.
- Source: The Big Brentford Book Of The Nineties

=== International caps ===
Pos	Nat	Player	Caps	Goals	Ref
MF	(Barbados)	Gus Hurdle	2	0	

=== Management ===
Name	Nat	From	To	Record All Comps					Record League				
Name	Nat	From	To	P	W	D	L	W %	P	W	D	L	W %
David Webb	(England)	12 August 1995	4 May 1996	57	20	16	21	35.09	46	15	13	18	32.61

=== Summary ===
Games played	57 (46 Second Division, 5 FA Cup, 4 League Cup, 2 Football League Trophy)
Games won	20 (15 Second Division, 3 FA Cup, 1 League Cup, 1 Football League Trophy)
Games drawn	16 (13 Second Division, 1 FA Cup, 1 League Cup, 1 Football League Trophy)
Games lost	21 (18 Second Division, 1 FA Cup, 2 League Cup, 0 Football League Trophy)
Goals scored	62 (43 Second Division, 10 FA Cup, 7 League Cup, 2 Football League Trophy)
Goals conceded	63 (49 Second Division, 5 FA Cup, 8 League Cup, 1 Football League Trophy)
Clean sheets	21 (18 Second Division, 2 FA Cup, 0 League Cup, 1 Football League Trophy)
Biggest league win	3–0 versus Peterborough United, 21 October 1995
Worst league defeat	4–0 versus Notts County, 1 November 1995
Most appearances	63, Paul Smith (46 Second Division, 5 FA Cup, 4 League Cup, 2 Football League Trophy)
Top scorer (league)	11, Robert Taylor
Top scorer (all competitions)	16, Robert Taylor

== Transfers & loans ==
Players transferred in
Date	Pos.	Name	Previous club	Fee	Ref.
31 July 1995	DF	(England) Ijah Anderson	(England) Southend United	Free	
12 September 1995	MF	(England) Paul Davis	(England) Arsenal	Free	
12 October 1995	MF	(England) Dean Martin	(Iceland) KA	Free	
Players loaned in
Date from	Pos.	Name	From	Date to	Ref.
15 November 1995	FW	(England) Andy Ansah	(England) Southend United	27 December 1995	
12 December 1995	FW	(England) Andy Sussex	(England) Southend United	12 January 1996	
19 January 1996	MF	(England) Scott Canham	(England) West Ham United	20 April 1996	
1 March 1996	MF	(Republic of Ireland) David Greene	(England) Luton Town	13 April 1996	
Players transferred out
Date	Pos.	Name	Subsequent club	Fee	Ref.
4 August 1995	MF	(England) Simon Ratcliffe	(England) Gillingham	Free	
7 August 1995	MF	(England) Paul Stephenson	(England) York City	£35,000	
10 August 1995	DF	(England) Shane Westley	(England) Cambridge United	Free	
25 March 1996	DF	(England) Martin Grainger	(England) Birmingham City	£400,000	
Players loaned out
Date from	Pos.	Name	To	Date to	Ref.
September 1995	MF	(England) Joe Omigie	(England) Woking	October 1995	
29 December 1995	MF	(England) Paul Abrahams	(England) Colchester United	20 February 1996	
Players released
Date	Pos.	Name	Subsequent club	Join date	Ref.
18 October 1995	MF	(England) Denny Mundee	(England) Brighton & Hove Albion	19 October 1995	
29 February 1996	MF	(England) Darren Annon	(England) Kingstonian	March 1996	
30 June 1996	DF	(England) Corey Campbell	(England) Dover Athletic	1996	
30 June 1996	MF	(England) Paul Davis	Retired		
30 June 1996	MF	(England) Jon Hooker	(England) Bishop's Stortford	1996	
30 June 1996	MF	(England) Dean Martin	(Iceland) KA	1996	
30 June 1996	MF	(England) Craig Ravenscroft	(England) Kingstonian	August 1996	

== Kit ==
Supplier: Core
Sponsor(s): Ericsson

Home	Away	Goalkeeper

Source: Brentford F.C.

== Awards ==
- Supporters' Player of the Year: Robert Taylor
- Star Player of the Year: Ijah Anderson
- Littlewoods Giant Killers Award: FA Cup third round
