= Jon Hooker =

English footballer

Personal information
- Full name: Jonathan William Hooker
- Date of birth: 31 March 1972 (age 54)
- Place of birth: London, England
- Height: 1.70 m (5 ft 7 in)
- Positions: Forward; midfielder

Senior career*
Years	Team	Apps	(Gls)
1993–1994	Hertford Town		
1994	Gillingham	0	(0)
1994–1996	Brentford	5	(0)
1996–1997	Bishop's Stortford		
1997–1999	Billericay Town	34	(4)
1999–2000	Braintree Town		
2000–2002	Harlow Town		
- * Club domestic league appearances and goals

Jonathan William Hooker (born 31 March 1972) is an English retired footballer who played as a forward or midfielder. He began his career in non-League football at Hertford Town and moved to the Football League with Gillingham in 1994. Shortly after, he moved to Brentford, for whom he made eight appearances during an 18-month spell. After his release in 1996, Hooker returned to non-league football and retired in 2002.

== Career ==
=== Hertford Town ===
A forward or midfielder, Hooker began his career in Sunday league football, before moving into non-League football with Isthmian League Third Division club Hertford Town.

=== Gillingham ===
Hooker secured a move to the Football League when he joined Third Division club Gillingham on trial on 7 November 1994, despite not harbouring an ambition to play football professionally. He made his professional debut with a starting appearance in a 3–1 Football League Trophy first round defeat to Brentford the following evening. It was Hooker's only appearance for the Gills and he departed a matter of days later.

=== Brentford ===
Hooker transferred to Second Division club Brentford for a £5,000 fee on 14 November 1994. He initially made Capital League appearances for the club's reserve team and was called into the senior team for the first time for a league match versus Peterborough United on 10 December. Hooker made his Football League debut when he replaced Darren Annon during the 2–2 draw. It was his only involvement in the first team during the 1994–95 season. He made regular appearances for the reserves, scoring five goals and helping the team to second place in the Capital League.

Hooker found himself out of favour during the early part of the 1995–96 season, but an injury to Ijah Anderson saw Hooker called into the team to make his first start for the club in a 0–0 draw with Bristol City on 12 September 1995. He started four games in a row and won "star player" recognition for his performance in a 1–0 home win over Walsall on 16 September. Carl Asaba replaced Hooker in the starting line-up and Hooker failed to appear again until he was used as a winger in a 2–0 defeat at home to Shrewsbury Town on 4 November. Hooker appeared as a substitute for Nicky Forster in the following game and made his final appearance for the club as a substitute for David McGhee in a 4–0 FA Cup first round replay win over Farnborough Town on 11 November. Hooker was released at the end of the season, having made just eight first team appearances for the Bees.

=== Return to non-League football ===
Hooker dropped back into non-League football and played for Isthmian League Premier Division club Bishop's Stortford during the 1996–97 season. Hooker signed for Isthmian League Premier Division new boys Billericay Town in 1997. He made 48 appearances and scored six goals during the 1997–98 season. He left the club at the end of the 1998–99 season to join fellow Isthmian League Premier Division club Braintree Town. Hooker joined Isthmian League First Division club Harlow Town in 2000 and played two seasons before retiring from football in 2002.

== Career statistics ==
Appearances and goals by club, season and competition
Club	Season	League			FA Cup		League Cup		Other		Total	
Club	Season	Division	Apps	Goals	Apps	Goals	Apps	Goals	Apps	Goals	Apps	Goals
Gillingham	1994–95	Third Division	0	0	—		—		1 (Note: Appearance in Football League Trophy)	0	1	0
Brentford	1994–95	Second Division	1	0	—		—		0	0	1	0
Brentford	1995–96	Second Division	4	0	2	0	1	0	0	0	7	0
Brentford	Total		5	0	2	0	1	0	0	0	8	0
Career total			5	0	2	0	1	0	1	0	9	0
