= Ijah Anderson =

English footballer (born 1975)

Personal information
- Full name: Ijah Massai Anderson
- Date of birth: 30 December 1975 (age 50)
- Place of birth: Hackney, England
- Height: 1.73 m (5 ft 8 in)
- Positions: Left back; left midfielder

Youth career
- –1993: Tottenham Hotspur

Senior career*
Years	Team	Apps	(Gls)
1993–1994	Tottenham Hotspur	0	(0)
1994–1995	Southend United	0	(0)
1995–2003	Brentford	202	(4)
2002–2003	→ Wycombe Wanderers (loan)	5	(0)
2003	→ Bristol Rovers (loan)	14	(0)
2003–2004	Bristol Rovers	39	(0)
2004–2006	Swansea City	18	(0)
2006	Lewes	4	(0)
2006	Harlow Town		
–2008	Bromley	4	(0)
- * Club domestic league appearances and goals

Ijah Massai Anderson (born 30 December 1975) is an English retired professional footballer, who made over 200 appearances as a left back in the Football League for Brentford. He also played League football for Bristol Rovers, Swansea City and Wycombe Wanderers.

== Career ==
=== Early years ===
A left midfielder, Anderson began his career in the youth system at Tottenham Hotspur and signed his first professional contract in 1993. He failed to make an appearance during the 1993–94 season and was released at the end of the campaign. He dropped down to the First Division to sign for Southend United in August 1994, but again failed to make an appearance before being released at the end of the 1994–95 season.

=== Brentford ===
Anderson joined Second Division club Brentford on a free transfer in July 1995 and signed a two-year contract. He began the 1995–96 season as manager David Webb's first choice left midfielder, before being dropped in favour of Jon Hooker in September 1995. Anderson continued as a substitute throughout much of the season, before gradually breaking into the team at left back and was such an able deputy that regular left back Martin Grainger was able to be sold in March 1996. He made 31 appearances and scored three goals during the 1995–96 season.

Anderson signed a contract extension in September 1996 and missed just three matches of the 1996–97 season, making 56 appearances, but the campaign ended on a sour note with defeat in the 1997 Second Division play-off final. Anderson was again a regular during the 1997–98 season, before a broken leg suffered in training in November 1997 ended his season.

After Brentford's relegation to the Third Division at the end of the 1997–98 season, Anderson returned fit for 1998–99 under new manager Ron Noades and collected the first silverware of his career when the Bees secured the Third Division title after a 1–0 victory in a "winner takes all" match versus Cambridge United on the final day. Back in the Second Division, Anderson missed three months of the 1999–00 season with a thigh injury, but worse was to follow, when he ruptured a knee ligament in training after the opening match of the 2000–01 season.

Aside from a thigh injury early in the campaign, Anderson remained fit during the 2001–02 season under new manager Steve Coppell, but again suffered play-off final heartbreak, losing 2–0 to Stoke City. Entering the final year of his contract and after requesting to be placed on the transfer list, the 2002–03 season marked the beginning of the end for Anderson at Brentford. On 28 November 2002, Anderson joined Second Division club Wycombe Wanderers on a five-week loan. After making five appearances, his loan was terminated early due to a thigh injury. After returning to fitness and a second loan, Anderson departed Griffin Park on 17 February 2003. In nearly eight full seasons with Brentford, he made 242 appearances and scored five goals.

=== Bristol Rovers ===
On 28 January 2003, Anderson joined Third Division club Bristol Rovers on trial. With the Pirates seeking cover for injured left back Trevor Challis, the trial was extended into the second week and on 8 February, Anderson joined the club on loan until the end of the 2002–03 season. Later that day, he made his debut for the club with a start in a 2–2 draw with Southend United. On 14 February, the paperwork was completed on a contract running until the end of the season. He made 14 appearances and helped the Pirates to avoid relegation into non-League football. Anderson signed a new contract to extend his stay at the Memorial Stadium and he made 41 appearances during a mid-table 2003–04 season. Anderson was transfer-listed in May 2004 and after failing to make an appearance during the early months of the 2004–05 season, his contract was cancelled on 14 October 2004. He made 55 appearances during just over 18 months with the club.

=== Swansea City ===
On 26 November 2004, Anderson joined League Two club Swansea City on a one-month contract, as cover for defenders Sam Ricketts and Garry Monk. The following day, he made his debut with a start in a 3–1 defeat to Bury. He became a regular in the team and after the contract was extended for a further month, he signed an 18-month contract on 21 January 2005. Anderson had a successful end to the season with the Swans, winning promotion to League One and winning the FAW Premier Cup.

Anderson was used exclusively as a substitute during the early months of the 2005–06 season, but was suspended by the club on 22 November 2005, after it was confirmed he had failed a drugs test on 1 November. He received a six-month ban from football on 19 December and after waiving his rights to an appeal, he was sacked by Swansea City on 2 January 2006. Anderson made 23 appearances and scored one goal during just over a year with the Swans.

=== Non-League football ===
After serving his ban from football, Anderson joined Conference South club Lewes in August 2006. He made just four appearances before being released less than a month later. He later played for Isthmian League First Division North club Harlow Town and ended his career with Conference South club Bromley in 2008.

== Personal life ==
Following his football career, Anderson was diagnosed with autism. As of August 2021, Anderson was working full-time for the National Health Service. He has interests in music (which include production, hosting events and radio) and clothing.

== Career statistics ==
Appearances and goals by club, season and competition
Club	Season	League			FA Cup		League Cup		Other		Total	
Club	Season	Division	Apps	Goals	Apps	Goals	Apps	Goals	Apps	Goals	Apps	Goals
Brentford	1995–96	Second Division	25	2	3	0	2	1	1 (Note: Appearances in Football League Trophy)	0	31	3
Brentford	1996–97	Second Division	46	1	2	0	4	0	4 (Note: 3 appearances in Football League play-offs, 1 appearance in Football League Trophy)	0	56	1
Brentford	1997–98	Second Division	17	0	0	0	4	0	0	0	21	0
Brentford	1998–99	Third Division	38	1	2	0	3	0	2	0	45	1
Brentford	1999–00	Second Division	31	0	0	0	2	0	2	0	35	0
Brentford	2000–01	Second Division	1	0	0	0	0	0	0	0	1	0
Brentford	2001–02	Second Division	35	0	1	0	2	0	4	0	42	0
Brentford	2002–03	Second Division	9	0	0	0	2	0	0	0	11	0
Brentford	Total		202	4	8	0	19	1	13	0	242	5
Wycombe Wanderers (loan)	2002–03	Second Division	5	0	—		—		—		5	0
Bristol Rovers	2002–03	Third Division	14	0	—		—		—		14	0
Bristol Rovers	2003–04	Third Division	39	0	0	0	1	0	1	0	41	0
Bristol Rovers	2004–05	League Two	0	0	0	0	0	0	0	0	0	0
Bristol Rovers	Total		58	0	0	0	1	0	1	0	60	0
Swansea City	2004–05	League Two	13	0	2	0	—		2 (Note: Appearances in FAW Premier Cup)	1	17	1
Swansea City	2005–06	League One	5	0	0	0	1	0	0	0	6	0
Swansea City	Total		18	0	2	0	1	0	2	1	23	1
Lewes	2006–07	Conference South	4	0	—		—		—		4	0
Bromley	2008–09	Conference South	4	0	0	0	—		0	0	4	0
Career total			286	4	10	0	21	1	16	1	333	6

== Honours ==
Brentford

- Football League Third Division: 1998–99

Swansea City

- Football League Two third-place promotion: 2004–05
- FAW Premier Cup: 2004–05

== See also ==
- List of doping cases in sport
