= 2005–06 Swansea City A.F.C. season =

- Manager: Kenny Jackett
- Stadium: Liberty Stadium
- League One: 6th (qualified for play-offs)
- Play-offs: Runners-up
- FA Cup: First round
- League Cup: First round
- Football League Trophy: Winners

During the 2005–06 English football season, Swansea City competed in Football League One.

== Season summary ==
Swansea had a good season in League One, finishing in sixth place to take the last play-off spot. After beating Brentford 3–1 on aggregate in the semi-final, the Swans faced Barnsley in the final. After a 2–2 draw at the end of extra time, Barnsley won the penalty shoot-out 4–3. This form did not translate to the cup competitions, being knocked out in the first round of both.

== First-team squad ==
Squad at end of season

Note: Flags indicate national team as defined under FIFA eligibility rules; some limited exceptions apply. Players may hold more than one non-FIFA nationality.

No.	Pos.	Nation	Player
1	GK	IRL	Brian Murphy
2	DF	WAL	Sam Ricketts
3	DF	TRI	Kevin Austin
4	DF	WAL	Kristian O'Leary
5	DF	ENG	Alan Tate
6	MF	ESP	Roberto Martínez
7	MF	ENG	Leon Britton
8	FW	ENG	Kevin Nugent
9	FW	ENG	Adebayo Akinfenwa
10	FW	ENG	Lee Trundle
11	MF	ENG	Adrian Forbes
12	FW	ENG	Lee Thorpe
14	MF	ENG	Kevin McLeod

No.	Pos.	Nation	Player
15	MF	CYP	Tom Williams
16	DF	ENG	Garry Monk
18	MF	ENG	Andy Robinson
19	MF	ENG	Darren Way
22	DF	ENG	Izzy Iriekpen
23	MF	WAL	Owain Tudur Jones
24	FW	ENG	Leon Knight
25	FW	WAL	Mark Pritchard
26	MF	WAL	Chad Bond
27	GK	GLP	Willy Guéret
28	MF	WAL	Shaun MacDonald
29	FW	NZL	Rory Fallon
30	DF	SCO	Steven Watt

=== Left club during season ===
Note: Flags indicate national team as defined under FIFA eligibility rules; some limited exceptions apply. Players may hold more than one non-FIFA nationality.

No.	Pos.	Nation	Player
15	MF	ENG	Gary Fisken (to Newport County)
17	FW	ENG	Paul Connor (to Leyton Orient)
17	DF	ENG	Keith Lowe (on loan from Wolverhampton Wanderers)
19	DF	ENG	Andy Gurney (to Swindon Town)

No.	Pos.	Nation	Player
20	MF	ENG	Marc Goodfellow (to Grimsby Town)
21	DF	ENG	Ijah Anderson (released)
24	DF	WAL	Christian Edwards (on loan from Bristol Rovers)
29	MF	ENG	Marcus Bean (on loan from Queens Park Rangers)

== League table ==
Pos	Team	Pld	W	D	L	GF	GA	GD	Pts	Qualification or relegation
4	Huddersfield Town	46	19	16	11	72	59	+13	73	Qualification for the League One play-offs
5	Barnsley (O, P)	46	18	18	10	62	44	+18	72	Qualification for the League One play-offs
6	Swansea City	46	18	17	11	78	55	+23	71	Qualification for the League One play-offs
7	Nottingham Forest	46	19	12	15	67	52	+15	69	
8	Doncaster Rovers	46	20	9	17	55	51	+4	69	

Rules for classification: 1) Points; 2) Goal difference; 3) Goals scored
(O) Play-off winners; (P) Promoted
