= Jon Macken =

English footballer (born 1977)

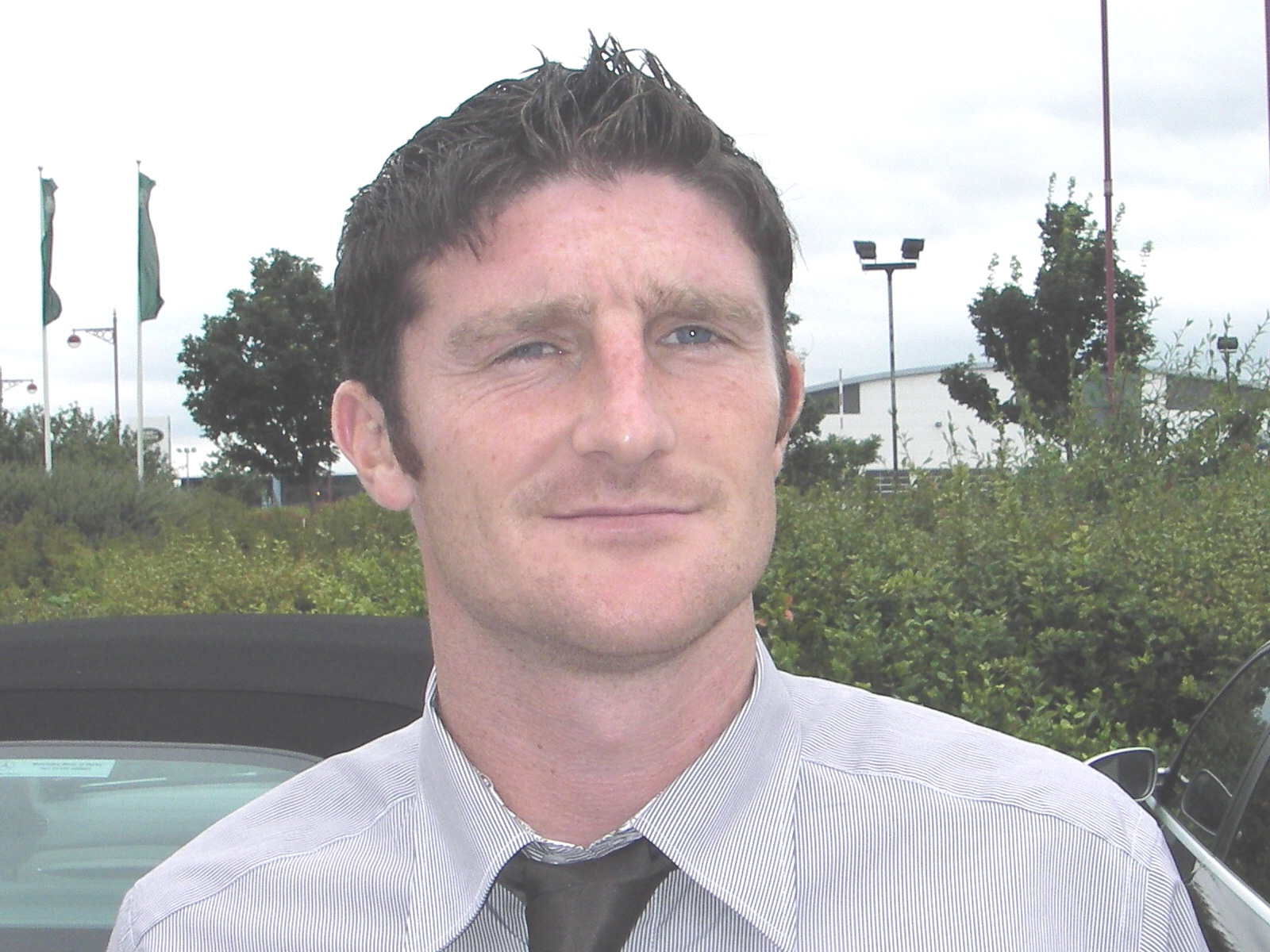
- Macken in 2007

Personal information
- Full name: Jonathan Paul Macken
- Date of birth: 7 September 1977 (age 49)
- Place of birth: Blackley, Manchester, England
- Position: Striker

Youth career
- 1995–1996: Manchester United

Senior career*
| Years | Team | Apps | (Gls) |
| 1996–1997 | Manchester United | 0 | (0) |
| 1997–2002 | Preston North End | 189 | (63) |
| 2002–2005 | Manchester City | 51 | (7) |
| 2005–2007 | Crystal Palace | 25 | (2) |
| 2006–2007 | → Ipswich Town (loan) | 14 | (3) |
| 2007–2008 | Derby County | 11 | (0) |
| 2007 | → Barnsley (loan) | 11 | (3) |
| 2008–2010 | Barnsley | 94 | (18) |
| 2010–2012 | Walsall | 76 | (21) |
| 2012–2013 | Northwich Victoria | 7 | (2) |
| 2013 | Stockport County | 13 | (1) |
| 2015 | Bamber Bridge | 1 | (0) |
| Total | | 491 | (120) |

International career
| 1997 | England U20 | 1 | (0) |
| 2004 | Republic of Ireland | 1 | (0) |

Managerial career
- 2017–2020: Radcliffe Borough
- 2021–2022: Colne
- 2022–2024: Witton Albion
- 2024–2026: Stalybridge Celtic
- * Club domestic league appearances and goals

Jonathan Paul Macken (born 7 September 1977) is a football manager and former professional player who played as a striker. He last managerial posiiton was at Stalybridge Celtic.

He began his career with Premier League side Manchester United in 1995 but was released two years later after failing to make a first-team appearance. He joined Preston North End for £250,000 and scored 63 goals in 189 league matches as Preston won the division two title in 2000 and reached the division one playoff final the season after. Macken joined Manchester City in 2002, winning the division one title and making his first Premier League appearance for City the following season. He only managed to score seven goals in 51 appearances during his three years with City but notably scored against United in the Manchester derby in 2004. He signed for Crystal Palace in 2005 and while there, moved to Ipswich Town on loan. In 2007, he moved again to Derby County but was loaned out to Barnsley after failing to make an impact at Pride Park where he failed to score in 11 league appearances. He joined Barnsley permanently in 2008 and moved again to Walsall two years later. He was released by the Saddlers at the end of the 2011–12 season and joined Northern Premier League side Northwich Victoria, before joining Stockport County briefly in 2013.

He has one international cap for the Republic of Ireland, which he earned in 2004.

== Club career ==
=== Preston North End ===
Born in Blackley, Greater Manchester, Macken began his career at Manchester United and signed as a professional in 1996, but left on 22 July 1997 without making a senior appearance in a £250,000 move to Preston North End in 1997.

He scored over 70 goals at Preston, twice winning the Player of the Year award. In 1999–2000, under David Moyes, Macken scored 25 goals as Preston won the Second Division title. The following season Macken again led the line as Preston reached the first division playoff final but lost 3-0 to Bolton Wanderers at Cardiff.

=== Manchester City ===
Following this success, Macken moved to fellow Division One side Manchester City in February 2002, for a fee of £5 million and was part of the team that ended the season winning promotion to the Premier League. He is most remembered at City for scoring the winner in the 4–3 comeback win against Tottenham in the 2003–04 FA Cup on 4 February. He is also remembered for scoring the 2nd and decisive goal against Manchester United in the first ever Manchester Derby at the City of Manchester Stadium. However, he was severely hampered by a succession of injuries, and only made 27 league starts in over three years. This downturn in his career brought about a move away from Manchester and Macken joined Crystal Palace in the summer of 2005 for £1.1 million.

=== Crystal Palace ===
Initially, Macken did not get into the Palace team, and was behind England international Andrew Johnson and Republic of Ireland international Clinton Morrison. An injury to Johnson gave him a chance, initially, but then he himself got injured. His own replacement, Dougie Freedman showed good form, and despite a recovery from injury, Macken did not get back in the team.

However, things turned upwards from there. Poor form by Morrison in the run-up to the Christmas period gave Macken his chance, and he scored his first competitive goal for Palace in the game at Coventry City, on 14 October 2005 (he had previously scored in a pre-season friendly), and scored again on 26 December, at Ipswich Town, although he was later sent off.

More injuries then continued to limit his chances, and the partnership with Johnson continued to alternate between Morrison and Dougie Freedman, with many fans voicing their discontent that Macken was not living up to his price-tag. Johnson was sold to Everton, prompting the return of Sándor Torghelle to the club from his loan at Panathinaikos, creating speculation that Macken may be leaving the club, but the appointment of Peter Taylor as manager appeared to silence this. Taylor, a known fan of Macken, had reportedly tried to sign him for Hull, while he was in charge there.

Torghelle left permanently for Greece, but again his playing opportunities were limited. On deadline-day of the Summer 2006 transfer window, he made a further move to Ipswich Town in The Championship, this time on loan, being handed the number 27 shirt. The loan was finally agreed when Ipswich agreed to pay an increased proportion of his wages. Macken scored three goals for the Tractor Boys before returning to Selhurst Park.

=== Derby County ===
On 31 January 2007, Macken joined Derby County on a free transfer. Derby were promoted to the Premier League at the end of the 2006–07 season, but he failed to win a regular place, or even score for The Rams, and was loaned out to Championship side Barnsley for two months in November 2007. Although he was recalled on 27 December 2007 he eventually signed a permanent deal with the Tykes on 28 January 2008 for £200,000.

=== Barnsley ===
Macken initially joined Barnsley on 1 November 2007, on loan from Derby County. He made his debut against the club that made his name, Preston North End. He remained goalless for his first nine games, despite having produced a string of fine performances. On 22 December, he scored his first Barnsley goal against promotion chasing Bristol City after a fine run and shot.

The goals were flowing for Macken and he notched a brace against Stoke City on 26 December. First a header from a Martin Devaney corner. His second goal came courtesy of a Kayode Odejayi knock-down from another Devaney cross. He then returned to Derby after Paul Jewell took over. He made a couple of substitute appearances for the Rams but his return to Barnsley was secured on 28 January 2008 for £200,000.

The next day, he marked his return with a goal in the home game with Colchester United. He then scored the second goal in a 2–1 win over West Bromwich Albion on 9 February, and also scored in a big win over Ipswich Town on 11 March.

He was released by Barnsley after the 2009–10 season and left when his contract expired in June.

=== Walsall ===
On 19 August 2010, League One club Walsall signed Macken on a one-year deal with the option of a further year. On 9 May 2012 it was announced that Macken had been released by Walsall.

=== Northwich Victoria ===
On 9 October 2012, it was reported that Macken had signed for Northwich Victoria. He made his debut for the club in a 1–1 draw at Newcastle Town, as an 80th-minute substitute, that evening.

=== Stockport County ===
On 31 January 2013, it was announced by Stockport County that Jon Macken had signed until the end of the 2012–13 season on a free transfer. Along with Mark Cullen and Jake Fowler, he was the first signing by new manager Darije Kalezić.

Macken made his Stockport debut as a second-half substitute in County's 3–2 home win over Nuneaton Town on 2 February. He scored his first goal for the club against rivals Macclesfield Town on 30 March. Following their relegation from the Conference National, he was released.

=== Bamber Bridge ===
On 24 February 2015, Macken came out of retirement to sign for Bamber Bridge. He made his debut in a 2–1 defeat to Darlington 1883 on 28 February.

== International career ==
=== England U20 ===
Macken made his debut for the England U20 national team in June 1997; he replaced Danny Murphy in the 64th minute of the win against the United Arab Emirates during the 1997 FIFA World Youth Championship in Malaysia. He picked up a late booking in the 5−0 win at the Larkin Stadium. This turned out to be his only cap.

=== Republic of Ireland ===
Despite being born in England and representing England at youth level, Macken was cleared to play for the Republic of Ireland in 2004; he qualified through his grandparents, who were born in Cavan. On 18 August 2004, he made his debut when he replaced Clinton Morrison in the 63rd minute of the 1−1 draw with Bulgaria at Lansdowne Road.

== Managerial career ==
In September 2017, Macken was appointed as manager of non-league club Radcliffe Borough. He left the club in January 2020 citing differences over the future direction of the club. He was appointed head coach at Colne in December 2021 but left after a disappointing end to the season in 2022.

On 21 October 2024, Macken was appointed manager of Northern Premier League West Division side Stalybridge Celtic. He was sacked by the club in October 2026.

== Honours ==
Preston North End

- Football League Second Division: 1999–2000

Derby County

- Football League Championship play-offs: 2007

Individual

- Football League Second Division Team of the Year: 1999–2000
- Preston North End Players' Player of the Year: 1999–2000, 2000–01
- Preston North End Young Player of the Year: 1999–2000
- Preston North End Player of the Year: 2000–01

== See also ==
- List of Republic of Ireland international footballers born outside the Republic of Ireland
