= Brett Angell =

English footballer and coach

Personal information
- Full name: Brett Ashley Mark Angell
- Date of birth: 20 August 1968 (age 58)
- Place of birth: Marlborough, Wiltshire, England
- Height: 1.94 m (6 ft 4 in)
- Position: Striker

Youth career
- 1984–1986: Portsmouth

Senior career*
Years	Team	Apps	(Gls)
1986–1987	Portsmouth	0	(0)
1987–1988	Cheltenham Town		
1988	Derby County	0	(0)
1988–1990	Stockport County	70	(28)
1990–1994	Southend United	115	(47)
1993	→ Everton (loan)	1	(0)
1994	→ Everton (loan)	1	(0)
1994–1995	Everton	18	(1)
1995–1996	Sunderland	10	(0)
1996	→ Sheffield United (loan)	6	(2)
1996	→ West Bromwich Albion (loan)	3	(0)
1996	→ Stockport County (loan)	18	(8)
1996–2000	Stockport County	108	(42)
1999–2000	→ Notts County (loan)	6	(5)
2000	→ Preston North End (loan)	15	(8)
2000–2002	Walsall	61	(16)
2002	Rushden & Diamonds	5	(2)
2002	Port Vale	15	(5)
2002–2003	Queens Park Rangers	13	(0)
Total		465	(164)

Managerial career
- 2014–2019: Hawke's Bay United
- * Club domestic league appearances and goals

Brett Ashley Mark Angell (born 20 August 1968) is an English football manager and former professional footballer.

As a player, he was striker and although notably spending time in the Premier League with Everton and Sunderland, he spent the rest of his career in the Football League with lengthy spells at Stockport County, Southend United and Walsall. He also played professionally for Portsmouth, Cheltenham Town, Derby County, Sheffield United, West Bromwich Albion, Notts County, Preston North End, Rushden & Diamonds, Port Vale and Queens Park Rangers. He retired in 2003 after scoring 200 goals in 540 games in all competitions. With Southend, he was promoted out of the Third Division 1990–91, and was also named on the PFA Team of the Year. He won promotion out of the Second Division with Stockport County and was later inducted into the club's Hall of Fame. He topped the Second Division with Preston North End in 1999–2000. He won his fourth promotion with Walsall after winning the Second Division play-off final in 2001. He was also listed in the 2006 book Cheltenham Town Football Club 50 Greats.

Following retirement, Angell moved into coaching, where he worked in the youth academies of both Bolton Wanderers and Portsmouth. He was appointed head coach of the New Zealand side Hawke's Bay United in September 2014.

== Playing career ==
Angell started his career as a defender at Second Division side Portsmouth, but never made the first-team and was released in 1987. It wasn't until he joined Cheltenham Town in July 1987 that Angell was converted from defender to a striker by the club's then manager John Murphy, who had discovered the player at a 6-a-side game. He scored 22 goals in 1987–88, becoming the Conference club's top-scorer. In February 1988, he was signed by Arthur Cox at First Division club Derby County for a fee of £45,000.

He never played in the Derby first-team and was instead sold to Asa Hartford's Stockport County for a club-record £33,000 fee in October 1988. He struggled to break into the first-team at the Fourth Division club, but found his shooting boots when new manager Danny Bergara took over in March 1989. During the 1989–90 season, he scored four goals in one game against Hartlepool United. He finished the campaign with 23 goals in 43 league starts to become the division's top-scorer. However, following defeat to Chesterfield in the play-offs he handed in a transfer request.

Angell switched to Southend United, who had won promotion into the Third Division after finishing one point and one place ahead of County. Stockport wanted £250,000 for the player, but Southend only offered £15,000 – a Football League tribunal later set the fee at £100,000, though Stockport had to pay Derby £19,500 as part of an agreed sell-on clause. He formed an effective partnership with target-man Ian Benjamin and became joint-top scorer in the Third Division in 1990–91, as he and Bolton's Tony Philliskirk scored 26 goals. The "Shrimpers" won promotion as the Third Division's runners-up, finishing one point behind champions Cambridge United and two points ahead of fourth-placed Bolton.

Southend settled into the Second Division, finishing in the top half of the table in 1991–92. Again, Angell finished as the club's top scorer with 23 goals and was named the club's Player of the Year. The Roots Hall faithful continued to witness second-tier football in 1993–94; however, Angell attracted interest from bigger clubs and joined top-flight Everton on loan in September 1993 and again in January 1994. Despite Angell playing just one game in each spell, manager Mike Walker signed him for a fee of £500,000 on 21 January (£160,000 of this went to Stockport as part of a tribunal agreement made four years earlier). However, Angell had just undergone major surgery on his left leg and was unable to play to his full potential so it proved to be a disastrous spell, his only goal in 19 games for the "Toffees" being a tap-in against Chelsea. Neville Southall later said that "the step up to the Premier League was probably too much for him" and he "had a first touch like a tackle". Manager Joe Royle sold Angell to Sunderland for £600,000 in March 1995, where he was similarly unsuccessful. He played eleven games for the "Black Cats", scoring once in the League Cup at Preston. Manager Mick Buxton was sacked shortly after Angell arrived at the club. He failed to impress new boss Peter Reid. He is widely regarded by fans of both Everton and Sunderland as one of the worst players to turn out for both of these clubs, where he failed to reproduce the form he showed in the lower divisions.

He was loaned out to First Division Sheffield United in January 1996, where he was reunited with Howard Kendall, who was manager at Everton during his first loan spell at the club. He scored twice in six games for the "Blades" before he was sent out on loan to West Bromwich Albion in March. Manager Alan Buckley used him as a substitute on three occasions before he returned to Roker Park. After being forced to train with the youth team at Sunderland, he returned to Stockport County in August 1996, now managed by Dave Jones, for a £120,000 fee.

Angell enjoyed a highly successful 1996–97 campaign when he was Stockport's leading goalscorer and inspired them to promotion to the First Division, as well as the semi-finals of the League Cup with victories over Chesterfield, Sheffield United, Blackburn Rovers, West Ham United and Southampton. He scored 18 goals in 1997–98, helping County to record an eighth-place finish in the second tier. The club continued to survive in the second tier in 1998–99 and 1999–2000. However, Angell was loaned out to Second Division sides Notts County and Preston North End in the latter half of the 1999–2000 campaign. He hit five goals in six games for County and scored eight in 17 games for Preston, who finished the season as Second Division champions.

He joined Second Division Walsall for 2000–01, in which he scored 13 goals in 48 games, including a hat-trick past Northampton Town. He picked up a play-off winners medal as he was an unused substitute in the 3–2 victory over Reading in the final. He scored 6 goals in 29 games in 2001–02, before he joined Third Division Rushden & Diamonds in March 2002. He played for Rushden at Cardiff in the play-off final, in which they lost 3–1 to former club Cheltenham Town. He was released by Rushden and then looked for a club near is home in Southport.

After two goals in seven games for Rushden, he joined Brian Horton's Port Vale on a short-term deal for the 2002–03 campaign. He scored seven goals in 17 games, before leaving in November after the club were unable to offer him a long-term deal due to financial constraints. He then joined Ian Holloway's Queens Park Rangers. He played 13 games for QPR and was an unused substitute in the play-off final defeat to Cardiff City at the Millennium Stadium – his third play-off encounter in as many years. Angell was heading to Ireland to play for Linfield in July 2003, however, the deal fell through as he refused to play trial games before signing a contract.

== Coaching career ==
Angell worked as a youth team coach at Bolton Wanderers and Portsmouth. However, his tenure as youth and reserve team coach at Portsmouth lasted only five months, and he was relieved of his position in April 2006. After a similar position at Bolton Wanderers, Angell then worked as a Coach Educator, teaching coaching courses for the Football Association, before taking up a Central Football regional coaching job in New Zealand. He was appointed head coach at New Zealand Football Championship club Hawke's Bay United in September 2014. Some players made it known that they would have preferred incumbent head coach Chris Greatholder to have stayed, and were released by Angell. He took the club to third in 2014–15 and second in 2015–16, though he faced continued speculation over his future at the club. In May 2019 he confirmed that he would not take up the club's offer to reapply for the position.

== Personal life ==
He is the brother of fellow professional footballer, Darren Angell.

== Career statistics ==
Appearances and goals by club, season and competition
Club	Season	League			FA Cup		Other		Total	
Club	Season	Division	Apps	Goals	Apps	Goals	Apps	Goals	Apps	Goals
Portsmouth	1986–87	Second Division	0	0	0	0	0	0	0	0
Derby County	1987–88	First Division	0	0	0	0	0	0	0	0
Stockport County	1988–89	Fourth Division	26	5	1	0	2	0	29	5
Stockport County	1989–90	Fourth Division	44	23	2	1	9	4	55	28
Stockport County	Total		70	28	3	1	11	4	84	33
Southend United	1990–91	Third Division	42	15	1	2	9	9	52	26
Southend United	1991–92	Second Division	43	21	1	0	3	2	47	23
Southend United	1992–93	First Division	13	5	1	0	0	0	14	5
Southend United	1993–94	First Division	17	6	0	0	6	3	23	9
Southend United	Total		115	47	3	2	18	14	136	63
Everton	1993–94	Premier League	16	1	0	0	0	0	16	1
Everton	1994–95	Premier League	4	0	0	0	1	0	5	0
Everton	Total		20	1	0	0	1	0	21	1
Sunderland	1994–95	First Division	8	0	0	0	0	0	8	0
Sunderland	1995–96	First Division	2	0	0	0	1	1	3	1
Sunderland	Total		10	0	0	0	1	1	11	1
Sheffield United (loan)	1995–96	First Division	6	2	0	0	0	0	6	2
West Bromwich Albion (loan)	1995–96	First Division	3	0	0	0	0	0	3	0
Stockport County	1996–97	Second Division	34	15	3	1	15	4	52	20
Stockport County	1997–98	First Division	45	18	2	2	4	3	51	23
Stockport County	1998–99	First Division	42	17	2	1	2	0	46	18
Stockport County	1999–2000	First Division	5	0	0	0	3	1	8	1
Stockport County	Total		126	50	7	4	24	8	157	62
Notts County (loan)	1999–2000	Second Division	6	5	0	0	0	0	6	5
Preston North End (loan)	1999–2000	Second Division	15	8	0	0	0	0	15	8
Walsall	2000–01	Second Division	41	13	3	1	4	0	48	14
Walsall	2001–02	First Division	20	3	2	1	0	0	22	4
Walsall	Total		61	16	5	2	4	0	70	18
Rushden & Diamonds	2001–02	Third Division	5	2	0	0	2	0	7	2
Port Vale	2002–03	Second Division	15	5	1	0	1	2	17	7
Queens Park Rangers	2002–03	Second Division	13	0	0	0	0	0	13	0
Career total			465	164	19	9	62	29	546	202

== Honours ==
Southend United

- Football League Third Division second-place promotion: 1990–91

Stockport County

- Football League Second Division second-place promotion: 1996–97

Preston North End

- Football League Second Division: 1999–2000

Walsall

- Football League Second Division play-offs: 2001

Individual

- PFA Team of the Year: 1990–91 Third Division
- Southend United Player of the Year: 1991–92
- Stockport County Hall of Fame inductee: 2002
- Cheltenham Town 50 Greats: published November 2006
