= Stephen Grant (footballer) =

Irish footballer (born 1977)

Personal information
- Date of birth: 14 April 1977 (age 49)
- Place of birth: Birr, Ireland
- Position: Forward

Youth career
- 1994–1995: Athlone Town

Senior career*
Years	Team	Apps	(Gls)
1995–1996	Sunderland	0	(0)
1996–1997	Shamrock Rovers	20	(4)
1997–1999	Stockport County	29	(4)
1999	Burnley	1	(0)
1999	Finn Harps	1	(0)
1999–2000	Waterford United	15	(4)
2000	Boston Bulldogs	23	(7)
2000–2001	Galway United	10	(4)
2000–2001	Shelbourne	2	(0)
2001–2004	Shamrock Rovers	111	(21)
Total		212	(44)

International career
1998–1999	Republic of Ireland U21	4	(1)
- * Club domestic league appearances and goals

Stephen Grant (born 14 April 1977) is a former professional footballer who now competes as a professional golfer on the NGA Pro Golf Tour.

== Career ==
During his career he played for Athlone Town, Sunderland, Shamrock Rovers (two stints 154 competitive appearances), Stockport County, Burnley, Finn Harps, Waterford United, Boston Bulldogs, Galway United and Shelbourne.

After playing for Athlone and Sunderland reserves his first taste of senior football came when Pat Byrne signed him for Rovers in October 1996. He became an instant hero by scoring on his League of Ireland debut against fierce rivals Bohemians on the 18th. After 4 goals in 22 total appearances he signed for Stockport for £300,000 in 1997.

He signed back again for Rovers in the summer of 2001 and wrote himself into the history books by becoming the first Irish player to score against a Polish side in European competition when Rovers beat Odra Wodzisław in the UEFA Intertoto Cup in June 2003 In total he made 6 appearances in Europe for Rovers.

In his last season he was Rovers top goalscorer in the 2004 League of Ireland season.

Grant retired from professional football at the relatively early age of 27 to concentrate on a career as a professional golfer. He played on the Challenge Tour in 2012.

Grant joined the Shamrock Rovers Member Club in 2012.

== Honours ==
- Leinster Senior Cup
  - Shamrock Rovers - 1997
