= Chris Byrne (footballer) =

English footballer

Personal information
- Full name: Christopher Thomas Byrne
- Date of birth: 9 February 1975 (age 51)
- Place of birth: Hulme, England
- Height: 5 ft 9 in (1.75 m)
- Position: Midfielder

Senior career*
Years	Team	Apps	(Gls)
1996–1997	Macclesfield Town		
1997	Sunderland	8	(0)
1997–2001	Stockport County	57	(11)
1999	→ Macclesfield Town (loan)	5	(0)
2001–2003	Macclesfield Town	35	(7)
Total		123	(28)
- * Club domestic league appearances and goals

Christopher Thomas Byrne (born 9 February 1975) is an English former professional footballer who played as a midfielder for various teams in the Football League.
