= David McGhee =

English footballer (born 1976)

Personal information
- Full name: David Christopher McGhee
- Date of birth: 19 June 1976 (age 50)
- Place of birth: Worthing, England
- Height: 5 ft 10 in (1.78 m)
- Position: Utility player

Youth career
- Plymouth Argyle
- St Austell
- 1993–1995: Brentford

Senior career*
Years	Team	Apps	(Gls)
1995–1999	Brentford	124	(9)
1999	Stevenage Borough	2	(0)
1999–2004	Leyton Orient	114	(7)
2004–2006	Canvey Island	42	(1)
2006	Chelmsford City	7	(0)
2006	Wivenhoe Town	6	(0)
2006–2007	Falmouth Town	24	(4)
2007–2015	Lanreath		

Managerial career
- 2014–2015: Lanreath (player-manager)
- * Club domestic league appearances and goals

David Christopher McGhee (born 19 June 1976) is an English retired professional footballer, who made over 230 appearances as a utility player in the Football League for Brentford and Leyton Orient.

== Playing career ==
=== Early years ===
McGhee was born in Worthing. Starting out as a defender, he began his career in the youth system at Plymouth Argyle. He was not taken on as a scholar by first team manager Peter Shilton and dropped into non-League football to sign for local South Western League club St Austell.

=== Brentford ===
McGhee joined Second Division club Brentford on trial in 1993, after the club responded to a contact request from his father. He signed a professional contract with the Bees in April 1994 and received his maiden call into the first team squad for a Football League Trophy first round match versus Brighton & Hove Albion on 19 October that year. He remained on the bench for the 1–0 victory. McGhee's professional debut came on 21 January 1995, when he replaced Darren Annon during a 2–1 league win over Hull City. He was largely an unused substitute during the rest of the 1994–95 season, finishing with seven appearances and scored one goal.

McGhee established himself in the first team during the 1995–96 season, wearing five different shirt numbers and proving to be an able utility player. He made 45 appearances and scored six goals.

McGhee's best season for Brentford came in 1996–97, when he made a season-high 53 appearances and scored two goals. The Bees led the Second Division for much of the first two-thirds of the season, before dropping to fourth position and qualifying for the playoffs. After beating Bristol City 4–2 on aggregate in the semi-finals, the Bees lost 1–0 to Crewe Alexandra at Wembley Stadium in the final.

McGhee was again a regular pick during the 1997–98 season, making 33 appearances and scoring one goal in which Brentford's playoff hangover consigned them to relegation to the Third Division after a final-day defeat to Bristol Rovers. A succession of injuries saw McGhee miss the entire 1998–99 season, and he retired in January 1999. He made 138 appearances and scored 10 goals during his time at Griffin Park.

=== Stevenage Borough ===
McGhee came out of retirement to sign for Conference club Stevenage Borough in August 1999. He made two appearances before departing Broadhall Way before the end of the first month of the season.

=== Leyton Orient ===
McGhee returned to the Football League to sign for struggling Third Division club Leyton Orient in November 1999. He quickly established himself in the side, making 23 appearances and scoring one goal during the remainder of the 1999–00 season to help the Os retain their league status. McGhee had an excellent 2000–01 season, making 51 appearances and scoring three goals as the Os finished in the playoff positions. As with Brentford in 1997, McGhee suffered heartbreak in his second appearance at Wembley Stadium, with Orient crashing to a 4–2 defeat to Blackpool in the final, after having twice taken the lead.

Orient suffered a hangover in the 2001–02 season, though McGhee again featured in almost all the club's matches, making 45 appearances and scoring two goals. McGhee's run as a mainstay of the team came to an end on 10 September 2002, when he suffered a ruptured achilles tendon after 11 minutes of a 3–2 League Cup first round victory over Queens Park Rangers. He returned to match play just over a year later and was named captain, but managed just 12 appearances and one goal during the 2003–04 season, before leaving the club on 25 March 2004. McGhee made 135 appearances and scored seven goals during five years at Brisbane Road. His performances earned him the nickname "Mad Dog".

=== Return to non-League football ===
On 25 March 2004, McGhee dropped into non-League football to join high-flying Isthmian League Premier Division club Canvey Island on a contract running until the end of the 2005–06 season. Following the club's promotion to the Conference Premier at the end of the 2003–04 season, McGhee failed to hold down a regular place in the team and made 47 appearances and scored one goal before departing at the end of the 2005–06 season.

McGhee continued his descent down the pyramid with short spells at Isthmian League clubs Chelmsford City and Wivenhoe Town respectively during the first half of the 2006–07 season. McGhee returned to Cornwall in late 2006 to sign for South Western League club Falmouth Town. He signed for East Cornwall League Premier Division club Lanreath in 2007 and played for the team until 2015. He re-emerged with the club's veterans' team 2017, playing as a goalkeeper.

== Managerial career ==
McGhee has held coaching and assistant manager positions in the youth setup at local Cornish club Looe Town. He served as joint-player-manager of East Cornwall League First Division club Lanreath during the 2014–15 season.

== Personal life ==
McGhee's son Callum played under his management at Lanreath. In March 2015, McGhee was diagnosed with a brain tumour.

== Career statistics ==
Appearances and goals by club, season and competition
Club	Season	League			National cup (Note: Includes FA Cup)		League cup (Note: Includes League Cup)		Other		Total	
Club	Season	Division	Apps	Goals	Apps	Goals	Apps	Goals	Apps	Goals	Apps	Goals
Brentford	1994–95	Second Division	7	1	0	0	0	0	0	0	7	1
Brentford	1995–96	Second Division	36	5	4	0	2	1	3 (Note: Appearances in Football League Trophy)	0	45	6
Brentford	1996–97	Second Division	45	1	3	1	3	0	2 (Note: Appearances in Second Division play-offs)	0	53	2
Brentford	1997–98	Second Division	29	1	2	0	2	0	0	0	33	1
Brentford	Total		117	7	9	1	7	1	5	0	138	10
Stevenage Borough	1999–00	Conference	2	0	—		—		—		2	0
Leyton Orient	1999–00	Third Division	22	1	—		—		1	0	23	1
Leyton Orient	2000–01	Third Division	39	3	4	0	4	0	4 (Note: 3 appearances in Third Division play-offs, 1 appearance in Football League Trophy)	0	51	3
Leyton Orient	2001–02	Third Division	40	2	4	0	0	0	1	0	45	2
Leyton Orient	2002–03	Third Division	3	0	0	0	1	0	0	0	4	0
Leyton Orient	2003–04	Third Division	10	1	1	0	0	0	1	0	12	1
Leyton Orient	Total		114	7	9	0	5	0	7	0	135	7
Canvey Island	2003–04	Isthmian League Premier Division	4	0	—		—		—		4	0
Canvey Island	2004–05	Conference Premier	22	1	0	0	—		3 (Note: Appearances in FA Trophy)	0	25	1
Canvey Island	2005–06	Conference Premier	20	0	0	0	—		2	0	22	0
Canvey Island	Total		46	1	0	0	—		5	0	51	1
Chelmsford City	2006–07	Isthmian League Premier Division	7	0	0	0	—		—		7	0
Wivenhoe Town	2006–07	Isthmian League First Division North	6	0	—		—		—		6	0
Career total			292	15	18	1	12	1	17	0	350	18
