= Farid Diaf =

French retired footballer and coach (born 1971)

Personal information
- Date of birth: 14 April 1971 (age 55)
- Place of birth: France
- Position: Midfielder

Senior career*
Years	Team	Apps	(Gls)
1989-1996	Olympique Alès		
	Stade Rennais F.C.	1	(0)
1997-1999	Stade Lavallois	39	(3)
1999-2000	Preston North End F.C.	3	(0)
2001	Boston United F.C.	4	(1)
2001-20xx	FACV		

Managerial career
- 2012-20xx: FACV
- Cabestany O.C
- * Club domestic league appearances and goals

Farid Diaf (born 14 April 1971) is a French retired footballer and coach.

== England ==
Described as a 'breath of fresh air' by Preston North End coach David Moyes, Diaf injured himself in training two days before the 1999/00 season began. Unfortunately, on the 6th of November at Colchester, he suffered a fracture under his left eye, so had to undergo an operation. Despite turning out with the reserves and expressing eagerness to get back on the field, the half-back was ruled out of action again with a January injury, posting three league appearances the entire season.

Asked about Preston North End, the Frenchman stated that the team, as well as the manager, exuded talent and that they could potentially produce football similar to Manchester United, who were one division above. He also claimed that the standard was higher than in France.
