= Michael Appleton =

English footballer (born 1975)

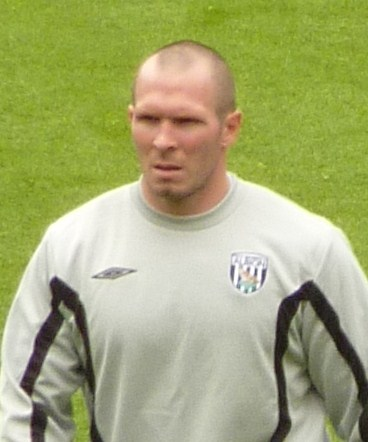
- Appleton in 2009

Personal information
- Full name: Michael Antony Appleton
- Date of birth: 4 December 1975 (age 50)
- Place of birth: Salford, England
- Height: 5 ft 9 in (1.75 m)
- Position: Midfielder

Youth career
- 1992–1994: Manchester United

Senior career*
Years	Team	Apps	(Gls)
1994–1997	Manchester United	0	(0)
1995	→ Wimbledon (loan)	0	(0)
1995	→ Lincoln City (loan)	4	(0)
1997	→ Grimsby Town (loan)	10	(3)
1997–2001	Preston North End	121	(12)
2001–2003	West Bromwich Albion	33	(0)
Total		168	(15)

Managerial career
- 2011: West Bromwich Albion (caretaker)
- 2011–2012: Portsmouth
- 2012–2013: Blackpool
- 2013: Blackburn Rovers
- 2014–2017: Oxford United
- 2017: Leicester City (caretaker)
- 2019–2022: Lincoln City
- 2022–2023: Blackpool
- 2023–2024: Charlton Athletic
- 2025–2026: Shrewsbury Town
- * Club domestic league appearances and goals

Michael Antony Appleton (born 4 December 1975) is an English professional football manager and former player, most recently head coach at EFL League Two club Shrewsbury Town.

As a player, he operated as a midfielder, in a nine-year career that began in 1994 and ended 2003. His playing years were cut short by a serious knee injury. He began his career as a professional for Manchester United. While there, he had brief loan spells at Wimbledon, Lincoln City and Grimsby Town, before securing a permanent transfer to Preston North End in 1997. He moved on to West Bromwich Albion in 2001, playing at the West Midlands club for two seasons, ending his playing career there.

Following his retirement, he became a coach with West Brom, and served as their caretaker manager for one match after Roberto Di Matteo was placed on leave. On 10 November 2011, he earned his first managerial appointment at Portsmouth, before he became manager of Blackpool a year later. After just over two months as Blackpool manager, he left his post with the Seasiders to take charge of Blackburn Rovers in January 2013. He was relieved from his duties on 19 March that same year. In July 2014, he was appointed manager of Oxford United, and led the club to promotion to League One in his second season.

== Playing career ==
=== Manchester United ===
Born in Salford, Greater Manchester, Appleton attended Seedley Primary School and Buile Hill Secondary School, both in Salford. He represented the football teams of both schools, playing as a striker until the age of "12 or 13" before switching to midfield. A lifelong Manchester United fan, Appleton progressed through the club's youth system before earning a professional contract in 1994. He had a brief loan spell at Wimbledon in 1995, featuring in their makeshift squad for the 1995 UEFA Intertoto Cup. In the 1995–96 season, he was loaned out to Lincoln City for a month to get first-team experience, playing four Division Three matches and one match in the Football League Trophy, before returning to Old Trafford.

In October 1996, Appleton made his Manchester United début in the 2–1 League Cup victory versus Swindon Town. His second and last game for the Red Devils was a 2–0 defeat at Filbert Street against Leicester City.

In January 1997, Appleton joined Grimsby Town on a two-month loan from United, scoring three goals in ten league matches for the Mariners, against Swindon Town, Barnsley and Manchester City. He returned to United in March 1997.

=== Preston North End ===
In the 1997–98 pre-season, Appleton joined Preston North End for a (then) club record fee of £500,000. In his three and a half years at Deepdale, he played 145 first-team games, scoring fifteen goals. He also played an important part in the Lilywhites' promotion to Division One in 2000 as Division Two champions.

=== West Bromwich Albion ===
In January 2001, Appleton moved from Preston to West Bromwich Albion for a fee of £750,000, signing a three-and-a-half-year contract. He made his début in a 2–1 victory over Sheffield United, picking up a yellow card, and went on to play an important part in the Baggies' play-off chase, although they ultimately lost to Bolton Wanderers in the semi-finals.

At the start of the 2001–02 season, Appleton was a regular in the first team, but on 19 November 2001, he tore posterior cruciate ligaments in his right knee, after an accidental training-ground collision with teammate Des Lyttle. He was initially expected to be out for the rest of the season. With West Brom getting promoted to the Premier League, Appleton had to wait until February 2003 for his return to football, 28 minutes into a reserve-team match against former club Manchester United. In November 2003, at the age of 27, he was forced to retire, after losing his two-year battle with the injury. West Brom manager Gary Megson described Appleton's retirement as "One of the saddest days I've had as a manager. Football can't afford to be losing a player of his ilk."

Appleton, who played his last first-team game of football in a single-goal victory at Birmingham City on 7 November 2001, made a total of 38 appearances for West Brom.

== Managerial career ==
=== West Bromwich Albion ===
"Having had my playing career taken away from me prematurely, I am all the more determined now to make a success of my coaching career."

— Michael Appleton

After the knee injury, Appleton stayed with West Brom in a coaching capacity. He worked in the club's youth side for five years. He worked with different age groups before moving up to the senior squad as assistant manager. In June 2009, Appleton was appointed first-team coach. After the board sacked Roberto Di Matteo and placed him on gardening leave on 6 February 2011, Appleton was placed in temporary charge of first-team affairs. In his only match in charge, West Brom drew 3–3 at home to West Ham, having been 3–0 up at half-time.

=== Portsmouth ===
On 10 November 2011, Portsmouth unveiled Appleton as their new manager on a three-and-a-half-year contract; his first official managerial role. Appleton's first League game in charge was a 2–0 defeat against Watford. Appleton made two new signings in Joe Mattock and George Thorne on loan from West Bromwich Albion. He had previously worked with them when on the coaching staff at West Brom.

Appleton made his first permanent signing by bringing in Kelvin Etuhu on a free transfer after Etuhu spent eight months in jail for carrying out an assault outside a Manchester casino in February. Following Portsmouth's fall into administration, Appleton insisted that he would not walk away from the club, vowing to "fight on until the end". Portsmouth were relegated from the Championship at the end of the 2011–12 season.

=== Blackpool ===
On 7 November 2012, Appleton was appointed manager of Blackpool on a one-year rolling contract. His first game in charge was on 10 November 2012, a 2–2 draw at home to Bolton Wanderers. He earned his first win as Blackpool manager on 1 December 2012, beating Peterborough 4–1 away from home, extending his unbeaten start to five games. He was in charge for a further six League games, of which he won one, drew three and lost two.

After his resignation, he became the shortest-serving Blackpool manager in their history, having been in the role for eleven Football League games.

=== Blackburn Rovers ===
On 10 January 2013, Appleton was given permission to speak to Blackburn Rovers, and it was announced a day later by Rovers that he had agreed to join the club as manager after 65 days in charge of Blackpool. Appleton said of his move across Lancashire to Blackburn: "I am delighted to be joining such a historic club. This is a fantastic opportunity for me and I am excited about the challenge we have ahead of us."

Appleton's first match in charge of Rovers was on 19 January 2013, a 2–1 defeat against Charlton Athletic at Ewood Park. He earned his first victory on 26 January 2013, a 3–0 win against Derby County at Pride Park in the FA Cup fourth round. A week later, he recorded his first league victory, a 2–0 win at home against Bristol City. On 16 February 2013, Appleton's Blackburn team defeated Premier League team Arsenal in the fifth round of the FA Cup at the Emirates Stadium; however, the victory was followed by a run of eight games without a win, with Rovers losing an FA Cup quarter-final replay at home to Millwall.

On 19 March 2013, after poor results in the Championship, Appleton was relieved of his duties as manager of Blackburn Rovers, having won four of his fifteen games in charge. A brief statement on the club website said: "Blackburn Rovers FC can confirm that Michael Appleton has been relieved of his duties as manager along with assistant manager Ashley Westwood, first-team coach Darren Moore and head of senior recruitment Luke Dowling."

Appleton's tenure at Blackburn lasted 67 days, two days more than his time as Blackpool manager. At his time of departure, Blackburn were 18th in the table, four points clear of the relegation zone, 13 points adrift of the play-off places with only nine games to go.

=== Oxford United ===
On 4 July 2014, Appleton became the new head coach of Oxford United, replacing Gary Waddock. In his first season, Oxford finished in thirteenth place in League Two. The following season, however, they finished second with 86 points, achieving automatic promotion to League One, and reached the final of the Football League Trophy at Wembley. In his third season in charge, Oxford again reached the final of the EFL Trophy, but again finished runners-up. They finished in eighth place in League One.

=== Leicester City ===
On 20 June 2017, Appleton was confirmed as the new assistant to manager Craig Shakespeare at Premier League club Leicester City, signing a three-year contract. After the dismissal of Shakespeare in October 2017, Appleton took over as caretaker manager for two matches, both Leicester victories, before the appointment of Claude Puel. On 30 June 2018, it was announced that Appleton had left his position at Leicester with immediate effect following a restructure of the coaching staff.

=== Return to West Bromwich Albion ===
On 26 April 2019, Appleton agreed to act as first-team coach to West Bromwich Albion caretaker manager James Shan until the end of the 2018–19 season, speculation having arisen in previous weeks that he could become the new manager of the West Midlands club. The move saw Appleton return to the Baggies following an eight-year absence, where he linked up with former associate Steven Reid, who was acting in the same role as Appleton. On 5 August 2019, West Brom announced that Appleton had been appointed as the coach of their under-23 squad.

=== Lincoln City ===
On 23 September 2019, Appleton returned to management, after being appointed at recently promoted League One club Lincoln City on a four-year deal. He replaced Danny Cowley, who left to take over at struggling Championship club Huddersfield Town. He signed a new four-year deal on 25 February 2021. On 30 April 2022, following their victory over Crewe Alexandra on the final day of the season, it was announced that Appleton would be leaving his role as manager.

=== Return to Blackpool ===
On 17 June 2022, Appleton was appointed head coach of Blackpool, his second stint at the club. He signed a contract until June 2026, succeeding Neil Critchley, who left two weeks earlier to become assistant to Steven Gerrard at Aston Villa.

On 18 January 2023, Appleton was dismissed from Blackpool following a run of one win in eleven games, with the club 23rd in the Championship relegation zone.

=== Charlton Athletic ===
On 8 September 2023, Appleton signed a two-year contract to become head coach of Charlton Athletic. On 23 January 2024, following a 3–2 defeat at The Valley against Northampton Town, and no wins in ten League One games, Appleton was dismissed.

=== Shrewsbury Town ===
On 26 March 2025, Appleton signed a contract with Shrewsbury Town until the end of the 2024–25 season as interim head coach, with Shrewsbury 14 points from safety with nine games left to play. Following Shrewsbury's relegation to League Two, Appleton signed a two-year contract to remain at the club as permanent head coach in May 2025. He was dismissed on 28 January 2026 following a run of four wins in 16 games, with the club two points above the relegation zone.

== Lawsuit ==
"I am relieved finally to have received judgment and to be able to put this chapter of my life behind me"

— Michael Appleton

In June 2005, Appleton announced that he was going to sue the surgeon who he believed had ended his career early. The surgeon's name was not announced, and the case was set to start in early 2007. In June, West Bromwich Albion began a £1 million compensation claim against knee specialist Medhet Mohammed El-Safty, whom the club described as "negligent". If West Bromwich Albion had won the case, it could result in many similar cases, the appeal court was told.

Appleton's case against Mr El-Safty was heard by Mr Justice Royce, a High Court judge, in Manchester, with evidence provided by Appleton's former manager Alex Ferguson and former teammates Ryan Giggs and Gary Neville. Appleton won his case, and on 23 March 2007 he was awarded £1.5 million in damages – thought to be one of the biggest pay-outs to an English footballer – as El-Safty had admitted he wrongly operated on him. It was said that he could have earned £500,000 a year in the Premier League, and the High Court also commented that his career could have lasted until 2009.

== Personal life ==
On 13 July 2021, Appleton announced that he was diagnosed with testicular cancer, and would take a short break to recover from the surgery. It was revealed in June 2022 that he had fully recovered.

== Managerial statistics ==
As of match played 27 January 2026

Managerial record by team and tenure
Team	From	To	Record					Ref
Team	From	To	P	W	D	L	Win %	Ref
West Bromwich Albion (caretaker)	6 February 2011	14 February 2011	1	0	1	0	0.0	
Portsmouth	10 November 2011	7 November 2012	51	13	11	27	25.5	
Blackpool	7 November 2012	11 January 2013	12	2	8	2	16.7	
Blackburn Rovers	11 January 2013	19 March 2013	15	4	5	6	26.7	
Oxford United	4 July 2014	20 June 2017	173	78	46	49	45.1	
Leicester City (caretaker)	17 October 2017	25 October 2017	2	2	0	0	100.0	
Lincoln City	23 September 2019	30 April 2022	143	55	33	55	38.5	
Blackpool	17 June 2022	18 January 2023	29	7	9	13	24.1	
Charlton Athletic	8 September 2023	23 January 2024	28	8	11	9	28.6	
Shrewsbury Town	26 March 2025	28 January 2026	43	9	9	25	20.93	
Total			497	178	133	186	35.8	—

== Honours ==
=== Player ===
Preston North End

- Football League Second Division: 1999–2000

Individual

- Denzil Haroun Reserve Team Player of the Year: 1995–96

=== Manager ===
Oxford United

- Football League Two second-place promotion: 2015–16
- Football League/EFL Trophy runner-up: 2015–16, 2016–17
