= Mark Rankine =

English footballer

Personal information
- Full name: Simon Mark Rankine
- Date of birth: 30 September 1969 (age 57)
- Place of birth: Doncaster, England
- Position: Midfielder

Youth career
- Manchester United
- Doncaster Rovers

Senior career*
Years	Team	Apps	(Gls)
1987–1992	Doncaster Rovers	164	(20)
1992–1996	Wolverhampton Wanderers	132	(1)
1996–2003	Preston North End	238	(12)
2003	→ Sheffield United (loan)	6	(0)
2003–2004	Sheffield United	13	(0)
2004–2006	Tranmere Rovers	65	(0)
Total		618	(33)
- * Club domestic league appearances and goals

Simon Mark Rankine (born 30 September 1969) is an English former footballer, who played over 700 games in English football in a 19-year career.

== Club career ==
=== Early career ===
Rankine began his career as a schoolboy at Manchester United, but was not offered a YTS contract and was released. He subsequently joined his hometown club Doncaster Rovers and progressed through their youth system, being part of the team that reached the 1988 FA Youth Cup final.

=== Doncaster Rovers ===
Rankine made his senior debut on 15 August 1987 in a 1–0 win over Grimsby Town in the Third Division. The club were relegated to the fourth tier that season, but Rankine had managed to become a regular member of the first-team squad. The following season, he was an ever-present, scoring 11 goals during the season. After two further seasons as a mainstay of the Doncaster midfield, he attracted interest from other clubs.

=== Wolverhampton Wanderers ===
He was eventually sold to Wolverhampton Wanderers of the Second Division for £70,000 in January 1992. Rankine made his Wolves debut as a substitute on 1 February 1992 in a 1–0 win over Leicester City. Although not as much an automatic choice as at his previous club, Rankine still featured regularly, amassing 167 appearances in total (though scoring just once) for the club over a four-and-a-half-year stay.

=== Preston North End ===
By the start of the 1996–97 season he was no longer part of manager Mark McGhee's plans and was sold to Preston North End for £100,000 in September 1996. Rankine went on to make more appearances for Preston than for any of his other clubs over a seven-year association. The club were newly promoted to the third tier at the time of his arrival, and he achieved a further promotion with them in the 1999–2000 season as champions. The following season saw him almost achieve Premier League football as he scored a late goal which helped them beat Birmingham City to reach the play-off final. After doing so he achieved legend status at North End and is nowadays looked upon by many Preston fans as a club hero. However, they lost 3–0 to Bolton Wanderers in that final.

=== Sheffield United ===
After Craig Brown had replaced David Moyes as Preston manager for the 2002–03 season, Rankine found his place under threat and he finished the campaign on loan at Sheffield United. This move offered him a second chance at promotion as United reached the play-off final, but Rankine again missed out on top-flight football as they lost to his former club Wolverhampton Wanderers (inflicting a second successive 3–0 final defeat on him).

Despite this disappointment, Sheffield United retained Rankine's services, signing him permanently in July 2003. He remained at Bramall Lane for just one full season before his contract expired and he left for Tranmere Rovers.

=== Tranmere Rovers ===
Rankine's first season with Tranmere saw him again reach the play-offs but they lost their semi-final tie on penalties to Hartlepool United. He had planned to retire at the end of the campaign but decided to sign a one-year extension in the close season. His second season was more of a struggle, and he opted to have his contract terminated by mutual consent and retire before the season's conclusion after finding it tough to play as regularly aged 36. Rankine scored once during his spell at Tranmere, in a 2–1 Football League Trophy win over Lincoln City on 18 October 2005.

== After football ==
In 2008 Rankine started working as a football agent.

== Personal life ==
He is the uncle of footballers Michael Rankine, Danny Rose, and Mitch Rose.

He has two children.

== Honours ==
Preston North End

- Football League Second Division: 1999–2000
