= Andy Sussex =

English footballer

Personal information
- Full name: Andrew Robert Sussex
- Date of birth: 23 November 1964 (age 61)
- Place of birth: Islington, England
- Height: 6 ft 3 in (1.91 m)
- Position: Striker

Youth career
- –1981: Leyton Orient

Senior career*
Years	Team	Apps	(Gls)
1981–1988	Leyton Orient	144	(17)
1988–1991	Crewe Alexandra	102	(24)
1991–1997	Southend United	76	(14)
1995	→ Brentford (loan)	3	(0)
1997–2001	Canvey Island		
2001–2005	Grays Athletic		
- * Club domestic league appearances and goals

Andrew Robert Sussex (born 23 November 1964) is an English retired professional footballer.

== Playing career ==
Beginning as an apprentice at Leyton Orient, Sussex turned professional in 1981 and made nearly 150 league appearances. He signed for Crewe Alexandra in 1988, where he made over 100 league appearances in three seasons. Sussex then signed for Southend United in 1991, making nearly 100 league appearances. He spent time on loan at Brentford, before playing non-league football with Canvey Island and Grays Athletic.
